= Sharon Manning =

American basketball player

Personal information
- Born: March 20, 1969 (age 57) Emporia, Virginia, U.S.
- Listed height: 6 ft 3 in (1.91 m)
- Listed weight: 186 lb (84 kg)

Career information
- High school: Greensville County (Emporia, Virginia)
- College: NC State (1987–1991)
- WNBA draft: 1997: 2nd round, 10th overall pick
- Drafted by: Charlotte Sting
- Playing career: 1997–2000
- Position: Forward / center

Career history
- 1997–1999: Charlotte Sting
- 2000: Miami Sol

Career highlights
- ACC Tournament MVP (1991)

Career WNBA statistics
- Points: 541 (4.7 ppg)
- Rebounds: 478 (4.2 rpg)
- Steals: 108 (0.9 spg)
- Stats at Basketball Reference

Sharon Manning (born March 20, 1969) is an American former professional basketball player. She played nationally (WNBA) and overseas.

== College ==
Manning attended North Carolina State University. She was the 1991 ACC Women's Basketball Tournament MVP, leading NC State to the title. In 2014, she was named to the Atlantic Coast Conference's 10th annual class of Women's Basketball Legends.

== WNBA ==
On April 28, 1997, Manning was selected with the 10th overall pick of the 1997 WNBA draft by the Charlotte Sting. Her debut game was played on June 22, 1997 in a 59 – 76 loss to the Phoenix Mercury where she recorded 2 points, 2 rebounds and 2 steals. Manning would spend her first 3 seasons as a member of the Sting. The Sting made the playoffs in her rookie year but were eliminated in the first round by the Houston Comets. They would reach the playoffs again in her sophomore season in 1998 (being eliminated in the first round again by the Comets) and her third season in 1999 (being eliminated in the Eastern Conference Finals by the New York Liberty). Manning's minutes and productivity were around the same in all 3 seasons with Charlotte, averaging 15.6, 19.2, and 16.3 minutes per game in her first three years (with her PPG being 4.9, 5.4 and 4.3 respectively).

During the 2000 expansion draft on December 15, 1999, Manning was selected by the Miami Sol. and spent her fourth season with the Sol, playing 24 games and averaging 4.3 points and 4.2 rebounds (but would miss the playoffs for the first time in her career).

Manning would announce her retirement from the WNBA on August 10, 2000 and thus her final WNBA game ever was the last regular season game she played with the Sol on August 9, 2000. In her final game, the Sol would defeat the Orlando Miracle 68–64 with Manning helping out with 2 points, 5 rebounds, 1 assist, 1 steal and 1 block in the victory.

== Career statistics ==
Legend
GP	Games played	GS	Games started	MPG	Minutes per game	RPG	Rebounds per game
APG	Assists per game	SPG	Steals per game	BPG	Blocks per game	PPG	Points per game
TO	Turnovers per game	FG%	Field-goal percentage	3P%	3-point field-goal percentage	FT%	Free-throw percentage
**Bold**	Career best	°	League leader

=== WNBA ===
==== Regular season ====
WNBA regular season statistics
Year	Team	GP	GS	MPG	FG%	3P%	FT%	RPG	APG	SPG	BPG	TO	PPG
1997	Charlotte	28	5	15.6	.464	—	.420	3.5	0.5	0.9	**0.2**	1.0	4.9
1998	Charlotte	30	6	**19.2**	.440	.000	**.667**	**5.5**	**1.0**	**1.1**	**0.2**	1.4	**5.4**
1999	Charlotte	**32**	6	16.3	**.504**	**1.000**	.522	3.6	0.5	0.9	0.1	**0.8**	4.3
2000	Miami	24	**9**	16.8	.478	.500	.538	4.2	0.7	1.0	**0.2**	1.6	4.3
**Career**	4 years, 2 teams	114	26	17.0	.470	.400	.548	4.2	0.7	0.9	0.2	1.2	4.7

==== Playoffs ====
WNBA playoff statistics
Year	Team	GP	GS	MPG	FG%	3P%	FT%	RPG	APG	SPG	BPG	TO	PPG
1997	Charlotte	1	0	4.0	**.500**	—	—	0.0	0.0	**1.0**	0.0	**0.0**	2.0
1998	Charlotte	2	0	11.0	.250	—	—	2.0	0.0	0.5	0.0	1.5	1.0
1999	Charlotte	**4**	0	**14.8**	.308	—	**.750**	**2.3**	**0.5**	0.3	0.0	**0.0**	**2.8**
**Career**	3 years, 1 team	7	0	12.1	.316	—	.750	1.9	0.3	0.4	0.0	0.4	2.1

=== College ===
College statistics
Year	Team	GP	Points	FG%	3P%	FT%	RPG	APG	SPG	BPG	PPG
1987–88	NC State	27	344	54.1%	0.0%	62.0%	7.9	0.3	1.3	**0.8**	12.7
1988–89	NC State	31	289	**56.3%**	0.0%	54.4%	5.3	0.6	1.4	0.2	9.3
1989–90	NC State	31	439	50.1%	0.0%	65.3%	8.2	1.8	1.3	0.2	14.2
1990–91	NC State	**33**	**497**	53.8%	0.0%	**66.0%**	**8.6**	**1.8**	**2.1**	0.2	**15.1**
**Career**		122	1569	53.2%	0.0%	62.8%	7.5	1.2	1.5	0.3	12.9

== Personal life ==
Manning graduated NC State with a degree in sociology.
