= 1999 Charlotte Sting season =

- Head coach: Marynell Meadors (fired Jul. 11, 5–7 record); Dan Hughes (10–10 record)
- Arena: Charlotte Coliseum

Results
- Record: 15–17 (.469)
- Place: 3rd (Eastern)
- Playoff finish: Lost in Conference Finals

The 1999 WNBA season was the third for the Charlotte Sting. The Sting won their first playoff series by defeating the Detroit Shock in the Eastern Conference Semifinals. In the Eastern Conference Finals they would fall to the New York Liberty in three games.

== Transactions ==
=== Orlando Miracle expansion draft ===
The following player was selected in the Orlando Miracle expansion draft from the Charlotte Sting:

Player	Nationality	School/Team/Country
Andrea Congreaves	United Kingdom	Mercer

=== WNBA draft ===
Round	Pick	Player	Nationality	School/Team/Country
1	9	Dawn Staley	United States	Philadelphia Rage
2	21	Stephanie McCarty	United States	Purdue
3	33	Charlotte Smith	United States	San Jose Lasers
4	45	Angie Braziel	United States	Texas Tech

=== Transactions ===
Date	Transaction
April 6, 1999	Lost Andrea Congreaves to the Orlando Miracle in the WNBA expansion draft
May 4, 1999	Drafted Dawn Staley, Stephanie MCarty, Charlotte Smith and Angie Braziel in the 1999 WNBA draft
May 29, 1999	Signed Nevriye Yilmaz
May 29, 1999	Waived Tora Suber
June 8, 1999	Waived Sonia Chase and Tia Paschal
June 30, 1999	Waived Christy Smith
June 30, 1999	Signed Sonia Chase
July 11, 1999	Fired Marynell Meadors as Head Coach
July 11, 1999	Hired Dan Hughes as Head Coach

== Roster ==
1999 Charlotte Sting roster
Players
Coaches

Pos.	No.	Nat.	Name	Height	Weight	DOB	From	Yrs
C	34	(United States)	Bauer-Bilodeau, Cass	6' 4" (1.93m)	180 lb (82kg)	1972-06-27	Montana State	R
F	45	(United States)	Braziel, Angie	6' 2" (1.88m)	169 lb (77kg)	1976-09-18	Texas Tech	R
F	23	(United States)	Bullett, Vicky	6' 3" (1.91m)	185 lb (84kg)	1967-10-04	Maryland	2
G	33	(United States)	Chase, Sonia	5' 9" (1.75m)	150 lb (68kg)	1976-03-09	Maryland	1
G	24	(United States)	Johnson, Niesa	5' 9" (1.75m)	146 lb (66kg)	1973-02-07	Alabama	R
F/C	50	(United States)	Manning, Sharon	6' 3" (1.91m)	186 lb (84kg)	1969-03-20	NC State	2
C	51	(United States)	Mapp, Rhonda	6' 2" (1.88m)	190 lb (86kg)	1969-10-13	NC State	2
G/F	6	(United States)	McCarty, Stephanie	5' 9" (1.75m)		1977-06-20	Purdue	R
G/F	0	(United States)	Reid, Tracy	5' 11" (1.8m)	150 lb (68kg)	1976-11-01	North Carolina	1
G	10	(United States)	Smith, Christy	5' 7" (1.7m)	141 lb (64kg)	1975-08-14	Arkansas	1
F	44	(United States)	Smith, Charlotte	6' 0" (1.83m)	148 lb (67kg)	1973-08-23	North Carolina	R
G	5	(United States)	Staley, Dawn	5' 6" (1.68m)	134 lb (61kg)	1970-05-04	Virginia	R
G	32	(United States)	Stinson, Andrea	5' 10" (1.78m)	158 lb (72kg)	1967-11-25	NC State	2

Head coach
(United States) Dan Hughes (Muskingum)
Assistant coaches
(United States) Kim Moseley
(United States) T. R. Dunn

Legend

- (C) Team captain
- (DP) Unsigned draft pick
- (FA) Free agent
- (S) Suspended
- Injured

== Schedule ==
=== Regular season ===
1999 game log
Total: 15–17 (Home: 8–8; Road: 7–9)
June: 3–5 (Home: 1–3; Road: 2–2)

Game	Date	Team	Score	High points	High rebounds	High assists	Location Attendance	Record
1	June 10	@ Washington	W 83–73	Dawn Staley (23)	Tracy Reid (8)	Dawn Staley (7)	MCI Center	1–0
2	June 12	New York	L 57–68	Andrea Stinson (15)	Vicky Bullett (9)	Staley; Stinson (4)	Charlotte Coliseum	1–1
3	June 19	Los Angeles	L 69–73	Stephanie McCarty (18)	Andrea Stinson (8)	Dawn Staley (7)	Charlotte Coliseum	1–2
4	June 22	@ Detroit	L 69–75	Bullett; Staley (13)	Rhonda Mapp (10)	Dawn Staley (7)	The Palace of Auburn Hills	1–3
5	June 24	Phoenix	W 88–72	Andrea Stinson (23)	Bullett; Manning (7)	Dawn Staley (8)	Charlotte Coliseum	2–3
6	June 25	@ Cleveland	W 59–57	Vicky Bullett (18)	Vicky Bullett (9)	Dawn Staley (5)	Gund Arena	3–3
7	June 27	@ New York	L 58–72	Andrea Stinson (15)	Sharon Manning (10)	Johnson; McCarty; Stinson (3)	Madison Square Garden	3–4
8	June 30	Washington	L 63–68	Dawn Staley (22)	Vicky Bullett (9)	Dawn Staley (6)	Charlotte Coliseum	3–5

July : 10–5 (Home: 5–3; Road: 5–2)

Game	Date	Team	Score	High points	High rebounds	High assists	Location Attendance	Record
9	July 3	@ Orlando	W 75–58	Vicky Bullett (24)	Bullett; Smith (11)	Andrea Stinson (5)	TD Waterhouse Centre	4–5
10	July 7	Cleveland	W 75–62	Dawn Staley (22)	Vicky Bullett (8)	Dawn Staley (5)	Charlotte Coliseum	5–5
11	July 9	Orlando	L 61–66	Charlotte Smith (12)	Sharon Manning (7)	Dawn Staley (7)	Charlotte Coliseum	5–6
12	July 10	@ Cleveland	L 56–82	Andrea Stinson (17)	Bullett; Mapp (6)	Charlotte Smith (4)	Gund Arena	5–7
13	July 12	@ Washington	L 71–74	Bullett; Stinson (19)	Rhonda Mapp (8)	McCarty; Staley; Stinson (5)	MCI Center	5–8
14	July 16	@ Orlando	W 56–50	Dawn Staley (23)	Andrea Stinson (8)	Andrea Stinson (5)	TD Waterhouse Centre	6–8
15	July 17	Washington	W 63–56	Andrea Stinson (17)	Rhonda Mapp (7)	Dawn Staley (5)	Charlotte Coliseum	7–8
16	July 19	Utah	W 73–66	Andrea Stinson (16)	Sharon Manning (7)	Dawn Staley (9)	Charlotte Coliseum	8–8
17	July 21	Minnesota	L 67–76	Tracy Reid (20)	Tracy Reid (7)	Sharon Manning (4)	Charlotte Coliseum	8–9
18	July 23	Houston	L 62–75	Andrea Stinson (18)	Vicky Bullett (7)	Dawn Staley (7)	Charlotte Coliseum	8–10
19	July 25	@ Detroit	W 78–66	Vicky Bullett (20)	Dawn Staley (9)	Dawn Staley (10)	The Palace of Auburn Hills	9–10
20	July 26	@ New York	W 75–69	Rhonda Mapp (18)	Rhonda Mapp (18)	Dawn Staley (8)	Madison Square Garden	10–10
21	July 28	Detroit	W 84–65	Andrea Stinson (27)	Bullett; Manning; Mapp; Smith (6)	Dawn Staley (7)	Charlotte Coliseum	11–10
22	July 30	New York	W 62–58	Rhonda Mapp (14)	Rhonda Mapp (10)	Dawn Staley (7)	Charlotte Coliseum	12–10
23	July 31	@ Minnesota	W 56–52	Andrea Stinson (17)	Bullett; Mapp (11)	Dawn Staley (5)	Target Center	13–10

August : 2–7 (Home: 2–2; Road: 0–5)

Game	Date	Team	Score	High points	High rebounds	High assists	Location Attendance	Record
24	August 2	Cleveland	W 62–56	Andrea Stinson (18)	Bullett; Mapp; Manning (7)	Dawn Staley (5)	Charlotte Coliseum	14–10
25	August 4	Sacramento	L 62–68	Dawn Staley (12)	Rhonda Mapp (9)	Dawn Staley (6)	Charlotte Coliseum	14–11
26	August 6	@ Houston	L 51–81	Vicky Bullett (10)	Braziel; Bullett (4); Stinson	Charlotte Smith (4)	Compaq Center	14–12
27	August 7	Orlando	W 64–60	Staley; Stinson (12)	Vicky Bullett (8)	McCarty; Staley (4)	Charlotte Coliseum	15–12
28	August 9	@ Utah	L 65–67	Rhonda Mapp (15)	Vicky Bullett (11)	Dawn Staley (6)	Delta Center	15–13
29	August 13	@ Sacramento	L 64–78	Rhonda Mapp (14)	Rhonda Mapp (14)	Mapp; Staley (5)	ARCO Arena	15–14
30	August 15	@ Phoenix	L 54–65	Dawn Staley (16)	Vicky Bullett (9)	Mapp; Stinson (3)	America West Arena	15–15
31	August 16	@ Los Angeles	L 65–76	Mapp; Stinson (15)	Bullett; Manning; Mapp (7)	Dawn Staley (5)	Great Western Forum	15–16
32	August 20	Detroit	L 57–58	Vicky Bullett (14)	Vicky Bullett (6)	Staley; Stinson (3)	Charlotte Coliseum	15–17

1999 season schedule

=== Playoffs ===
1999 playoff game log
First round vs. Detroit Shock
Won Series: 1–0

Game	Date	Team	Score	High points	High rebounds	High assists	Location Attendance	Record
1	August 24	@ Detroit	W 60–54	Mapp; Stinson (16)	Andrea Stinson (14)	Dawn Staley (5)	The Palace of Auburn Hills	1–0

Conference Finals vs. New York Liberty
Lost Series: 1–2

Game	Date	Team	Score	High points	High rebounds	High assists	Location Attendance	Record
1	August 27	New York	W 78–67	Mapp; Staley; Stinson (16)	Vicky Bullett (11)	Dawn Staley (9)	Charlotte Coliseum	1–0
2	August 29	@ New York	L 70–74	Andrea Stinson (27)	Mapp; Smith; Stinson (6)	Andrea Stinson (4)	Madison Square Garden	1–1
3	August 30	@ New York	L 54–69	Andrea Stinson (24)	Rhonda Mapp (6)	Dawn Staley (6)	Madison Square Garden	1–2

1999 playoff schedule

=== Season standings ===
Eastern Conference	W	L	PCT	Conf.	GB
New York Liberty ^{x}	18	14	.563	12–8	–
Detroit Shock ^{x}	15	17	.469	12–8	3.0
Charlotte Sting ^{x}	15	17	.469	12–8	3.0
Orlando Miracle ^{o}	15	17	.469	9–11	3.0
Washington Mystics ^{o}	12	20	.375	10–10	6.0
Cleveland Rockers ^{o}	7	25	.219	5–15	11.0

== Statistics ==
Legend
GP	Games played	GS	Games started	MPG	Minutes per game	RPG	Rebounds per game
APG	Assists per game	SPG	Steals per game	BPG	Blocks per game	PPG	Points per game
FG%	Field-goal percentage	3P%	3-point field-goal percentage	FT%	Free-throw percentage	TO	Turnovers per game
PF	Fouls per game		Team leader		League leader

=== Regular season ===
Player	GP	GS	MPG	FG%	3P%	FT%	RPG	APG	SPG	BPG	PPG
Dawn Staley	32	32	33.3	.415	.317	.934	2.3	5.5	1.2	0.1	11.5
Andrea Stinson	32	32	32.5	.460	.309	.739	3.5	2.9	1.0	0.6	13.6
Vicky Bullett	32	32	31.5	.486	.370	.773	6.8	1.6	1.9	1.4	11.5
Rhonda Mapp	30	26	26.3	.500	.111	.721	6.4	1.9	0.8	0.4	9.5
Charlotte Smith	32	24	23.3	.330	.143	.707	3.6	1.8	0.3	0.2	5.4
Stephanie McCarty	30	5	18.8	.408	.354	.909	1.6	1.7	0.6	0.1	5.3
Sharon Manning	32	6	16.3	.504	1.000	.522	3.6	0.5	0.9	0.1	4.3
Tracy Reid	10	3	15.4	.429	.000	.429	2.3	0.9	0.1	0.2	4.8
Niesa Johnson	31	0	9.5	.300	.261	.917	0.6	1.4	0.3	0.1	1.5
Angie Braziel	7	0	5.9	.500	N/A	.833	1.6	0.4	0.3	0.0	3.4
Cass Bauer-Bilodeau	25	0	4.9	.382	.000	.875	0.8	0.2	0.0	0.0	1.3
Christy Smith	4	0	4.8	.750	.667	.833	0.3	0.3	0.3	0.0	3.3
Sonia Chase	13	0	4.5	.188	.273	1.000	0.4	0.4	0.3	0.0	0.8

^{‡}Waived/Released during the season
^{†}Traded during the season
^{≠}Acquired during the season
