= 1998 Charlotte Sting season =

- Head coach: Marynell Meadors
- Arena: Charlotte Coliseum

Results
- Record: 18–12 (.600)
- Place: 2nd (Eastern)
- Playoff finish: Lost WNBA Semifinals (2-0) to Houston Comets

The 1998 WNBA season was the second for the Charlotte Sting. The Sting qualified for the playoffs, but they lost in the league semifinals to eventual champion Houston Comets.

== Transactions ==
=== Washington Mystics expansion draft ===
The following player was selected in the Washington Mystics expansion draft from the Charlotte Sting:

Player	Nationality	School/Team/Country
Penny Moore	United States	Long Beach State

=== WNBA draft ===
Round	Pick	Player	Nationality	School/Team/Country
1	7	Tracy Reid	United States	North Carolina
2	17	Christy Smith	United States	Arkansas
3	27	Pollyanna Johns Kimbrough	Bahamas	Michigan
4	37	Sonia Chase	United States	Maryland

=== Transactions ===
Date	Transaction
February 18, 1998	Lost Penny Moore to the Washington Mystics in the WNBA expansion draft
April 29, 1998	Drafted Tracy Reid, Christy Smith, Pollyanna Johns Kimbrough and Sonia Chase in the 1998 WNBA draft
June 6, 1998	Waived Charmin Smith and Katasha Artis

== Roster ==
1998 Charlotte Sting roster
Players
Coaches

Pos.	No.	Nat.	Name	Height	Weight	DOB	From	Yrs
F	13	(Canada)	Boucher, Kelly	6' 2" (1.88m)		1968-01-13		R
F	23	(United States)	Bullett, Vicky	6' 3" (1.91m)	185 lb (84kg)	1967-10-04	Maryland	1
G	33	(United States)	Chase, Sonia	5' 9" (1.75m)	150 lb (68kg)	1976-03-09	Maryland	R
F/C	3	(United Kingdom)	Congreaves, Andrea	6' 2" (1.88m)	183 lb (83kg)	1970-06-03	Mercer	1
C	41	(The Bahamas)	Johns Kimbrough, Pollyanna	6' 3" (1.91m)	165 lb (75kg)	1975-06-11	Michigan	R
F/C	50	(United States)	Manning, Sharon	6' 3" (1.91m)	186 lb (84kg)	1969-03-20	NC State	1
C	51	(United States)	Mapp, Rhonda	6' 2" (1.88m)	190 lb (86kg)	1969-10-13	NC State	1
F	22	(United States)	Paschal, Tia	6' 1" (1.85m)	165 lb (75kg)	1969-03-22	Florida State	R
G/F	0	(United States)	Reid, Tracy	5' 11" (1.8m)	150 lb (68kg)	1976-11-01	North Carolina	R
G	10	(United States)	Smith, Christy	5' 7" (1.7m)	141 lb (64kg)	1975-08-14	Arkansas	R
G	32	(United States)	Stinson, Andrea	5' 10" (1.78m)	158 lb (72kg)	1967-11-25	NC State	1
G	7	(United States)	Suber, Tora	5' 7" (1.7m)	137 lb (62kg)	1974-11-23	Virginia	1

Head coach
(United States) Marynell Meadors (Middle Tennessee)
Assistant coaches
(United States) Dan Hughes
(United States) Karen Freeman

Legend

- (C) Team captain
- (DP) Unsigned draft pick
- (FA) Free agent
- (S) Suspended
- Injured

== Schedule ==
=== Regular season ===
1998 game log
Total: 18–12 (Home: 9–6; Road: 9–6)
June: 7–2 (Home: 3–1; Road: 4–1)

Game	Date	Team	Score	High points	High rebounds	High assists	Location Attendance	Record
1	June 11	Washington	W 83–57	Andrea Stinson (19)	Vicky Bullett (7)	Christy Smith (5)	Charlotte Coliseum	1–0
2	June 13	@ Detroit	W 78–69	Andrea Stinson (13)	Vicky Bullett (12)	Andrea Stinson (4)	The Palace of Auburn Hills	2–0
3	June 15	Houston	L 65–79	Tracy Reid (20)	Rhonda Mapp (9)	Tora Suber (6)	Charlotte Coliseum	2–1
4	June 18	Detroit	W 71–67	Rhonda Mapp (18)	Vicky Bullett (8)	Reid; Smith (4)	Charlotte Coliseum	3–1
5	June 21	@ Phoenix	W 72–71	Tracy Reid (21)	Congreaves; Reid (8)	Andrea Stinson (8)	America West Arena	4–1
6	June 24	@ Los Angeles	W 77–73	Vicky Bullett (22)	Sharon Manning (15)	Smith; Stinson (5)	Great Western Forum	5–1
7	June 25	@ Utah	W 91–83	Andrea Stinson (25)	Bullett; Stinson (7)	Andrea Stinson (5)	Delta Center	6–1
8	June 27	Sacramento	W 58–50	Vicky Bullett (17)	Andrea Stinson (9)	Christy Smith (5)	Charlotte Coliseum	7–1
9	June 29	@ Detroit	L 49–60	Andrea Congreaves (10)	Vicky Bullett (9)	Congreaves; Stinson (2)	The Palace of Auburn Hills	7–2

July : 8–5 (Home: 4–3; Road: 4–2)

Game	Date	Team	Score	High points	High rebounds	High assists	Location Attendance	Record
10	July 4	Phoenix	W 68–66	Andrea Stinson (19)	Sharon Manning (8)	Andrea Stinson (7)	Charlotte Coliseum	8–2
11	July 7	@ Los Angeles	L 79–86	Andrea Stinson (21)	Andrea Stinson (10)	Christy Smith (6)	Great Western Forum	8–3
12	July 8	@ Utah	W 77–69	Congreaves; Stinson (14)	Tracy Reid (6)	Smith; Stinson (6)	Delta Center	9–3
13	July 10	@ Sacramento	W 63–55	Andrea Stinson (18)	Tracy Reid (12)	Tora Suber (4)	ARCO Arena	10–3
14	July 12	@ New York	W 75–57	Andrea Congreaves (23)	Congreaves; Manning (10)	Andrea Stinson (7)	Madison Square Garden	11–3
15	July 15	New York	W 72–65	Vicky Bullett (19)	Manning; Reid; Stinson (5)	Andrea Stinson (7)	Charlotte Coliseum	12–3
16	July 17	Washington	W 86–56	Tracy Reid (17)	Manning; Reid (8)	Tracy Reid (4)	Charlotte Coliseum	13–3
17	July 19	@ Cleveland	L 69–85	Tracy Reid (20)	Tracy Reid (7)	Sharon Manning (4)	Gund Arena	13–4
18	July 21	@ Washington	W 84–67	Vicky Bullett (19)	Vicky Bullett (7)	Tora Suber (6)	MCI Center	14–4
19	July 22	Utah	L 58–61	Rhonda Mapp (17)	Vicky Bullett (11)	Andrea Stinson (6)	Charlotte Coliseum	14–5
20	July 25	Houston	L 58–67	Andrea Stinson (18)	Sharon Manning (15)	Christy Smith (7)	Charlotte Coliseum	14–6
21	July 27	Sacramento	L 70–76	Andrea Stinson (15)	Vicky Bullett (8)	Andrea Stinson (5)	Charlotte Coliseum	14–7
22	July 30	Cleveland	W 79–64	Rhonda Mapp (20)	Vicky Bullett (12)	Andrea Stinson (7)	Charlotte Coliseum	15–7

August : 3–5 (Home: 2–2; Road: 1–3)

Game	Date	Team	Score	High points	High rebounds	High assists	Location Attendance	Record
23	August 2	@ New York	L 67–85	Rhonda Mapp (16)	Vicky Bullett (10)	Andrea Stinson (3)	Madison Square Garden	15–8
24	August 3	Detroit	W 71–68	Vicky Bullett (19)	Vicky Bullett (13)	Christy Smith; Stinson (4)	Charlotte Coliseum	16–8
25	August 5	New York	W 69–61	Andrea Stinson (19)	Vicky Bullett (9)	Tora Suber (6)	Charlotte Coliseum	17–8
26	August 8	@ Cleveland	L 58–65	Vicky Bullett (17)	Sharon Manning (9)	Andrea Stinson (5)	Gund Arena	17–9
27	August 10	@ Houston	L 67–70	Tracy Reid (22)	Tora Suber (8)	Mapp; Suber (4)	Compaq Center	17–10
28	August 12	Los Angeles	L 52–65	Andrea Stinson (15)	Vicky Bullett (8)	Mapp; Stinson; Suber (3)	Charlotte Coliseum	17–11
29	August 14	Cleveland	L 72–85	Andrea Stinson (20)	Rhonda Mapp (9)	Tora Suber (9)	Charlotte Coliseum	17–12
30	August 19	@ Washington	W 105–69	Andrea Stinson (23)	Sharon Manning (7)	Christy Smith (7)	MCI Center	18–12

1998 season schedule

=== Playoffs ===
1998 playoff game log
Semifinal vs. Houston Comets
Lost Series: 0–2

Game	Date	Team	Score	High points	High rebounds	High assists	Location Attendance	Record
1	August 22	@ Houston	L 71–85	Mapp; Stinson (16)	Andrea Stinson (7)	Andrea Stinson (7)	Compaq Center	0–1
2	August 24	@ Houston	L 61–77	Tracy Reid (18)	Vicky Bullett (11)	Andrea Stinson (6)	Compaq Center	0–2

1998 playoff schedule

=== Season standings ===
Eastern Conference	W	L	PCT	Conf.	GB
Cleveland Rockers ^{x}	20	10	.667	12–4	–
Charlotte Sting ^{x}	18	12	.600	11–5	2.0
New York Liberty ^{o}	18	12	.600	8–8	2.0
Detroit Shock ^{o}	17	13	.567	8–8	3.0
Washington Mystics ^{o}	3	27	.100	1–15	17.0

== Statistics ==
Legend
GP	Games played	GS	Games started	MPG	Minutes per game	RPG	Rebounds per game
APG	Assists per game	SPG	Steals per game	BPG	Blocks per game	PPG	Points per game
FG%	Field-goal percentage	3P%	3-point field-goal percentage	FT%	Free-throw percentage	TO	Turnovers per game
PF	Fouls per game		Team leader		League leader

=== Regular season ===
Player	GP	GS	MPG	FG%	3P%	FT%	RPG	APG	SPG	BPG	PPG
Andrea Stinson	30	30	34.9	.418	.282	.750	4.6	4.5	1.8	0.5	15.0
Tracy Reid	30	30	32.2	.487	.000	.613	5.2	1.5	1.3	0.4	13.8
Vicky Bullett	30	30	31.6	.441	.154	.826	6.5	1.5	2.2	1.5	13.3
Tora Suber	30	12	22.7	.314	.310	.630	1.8	2.9	1.0	0.0	6.0
Rhonda Mapp	21	14	21.7	.506	.100	.750	4.2	1.6	0.6	0.4	10.1
Sharon Manning	30	6	19.2	.440	.000	.667	5.5	1.0	1.1	0.2	5.4
Christy Smith	24	18	18.7	.360	.316	.850	1.4	3.0	0.4	0.0	3.7
Andrea Congreaves	24	19	15.5	.432	.294	.905	3.0	1.5	0.5	0.2	4.3
Pollyanna Johns Kimbrough	24	0	7.5	.489	N/A	.643	1.5	0.3	0.1	0.1	2.6
Sonia Chase	23	0	7.2	.500	N/A	1.000	0.6	0.6	0.2	0.0	1.5
Kelly Boucher	9	0	5.8	.200	.167	.750	1.4	0.2	0.1	0.0	1.1
Tia Paschal	20	0	5.5	.297	.250	.667	0.8	0.5	0.4	0.0	1.4

^{‡}Waived/Released during the season
^{†}Traded during the season
^{≠}Acquired during the season
