= Vicky Bullett =

American basketball player and coach (born 1967)

West Virginia Wesleyan Bobcats
- Title: Head coach
- League: Mountain East Conference

Personal information
- Born: October 4, 1967 (age 59) Martinsburg, West Virginia, U.S.
- Listed height: 6 ft 3 in (1.91 m)
- Listed weight: 185 lb (84 kg)

Career information
- High school: Martinsburg (Martinsburg, West Virginia)
- College: Maryland (1985–1989)
- WNBA draft: 1997: Initial allocation round
- Drafted by: Charlotte Sting
- Playing career: 1990–2006
- Position: Forward
- Number: 23, 40
- Coaching career: 2009–present

Career history

Playing
- 1990–1993: Bari
- 1993–1997: Cesena
- 1997–1999: Charlotte Sting
- 1997–1998: Fluminense
- 2000–2002: Washington Mystics
- 2002–2004: Taranto
- 2004–2006: Napoli

Coaching
- 2009: Washington Mystics (assistant)
- 2011–2012: Hagerstown CC (assistant)
- 2012–2016: Hagerstown CC
- 2016–present: West Virginia Wesleyan

Career highlights
- Serie A (2003); Coppa Italia (2003); Supercoppa Italiana (2003); WNBA All-Star (1999); All-American – Kodak, USBWA (1989); ACC Player of the Year (1989); ACC Tournament MVP (1989); 2× First-team All-ACC (1988, 1989)
- Stats at Basketball Reference
- Women's Basketball Hall of Fame
Medals
Women's basketball
Representing the United States
Gold medal – first place	1988 Seoul	Team competition
Bronze medal – third place	1992 Barcelona	Team competition
FIBA World Championship
Gold medal – first place	1990 Malaysia	Team competition

Victoria Andrea Bullett (born October 4, 1967) is an American former professional basketball player and current women's basketball head coach at West Virginia Wesleyan College. She played for the Charlotte Sting and Washington Mystics in the WNBA, as well as for European and South American professional teams, the U.S. Olympic team, and the University of Maryland Terrapins. Bullett played at various times as a center, small forward, and power forward. She was inducted into the Women's Basketball Hall of Fame in 2011.

== Early years ==
Bullett spent her childhood in Martinsburg, West Virginia. She grew up playing backyard basketball with her six brothers. One of her older brothers coached her high school basketball team and helped Bullett attract the attention of collegiate scouts. Bullett's younger brother Scott played Major League Baseball for the Pittsburgh Pirates and Chicago Cubs in the 1990s.

== College career ==
Bullett is one of the most decorated players in the history of the women's basketball program at the University of Maryland, which she attended from 1985 to 1989. Over the course of her college career, Bullett averaged 16.9 points per game and 8.5 rebounds per game. She set Maryland records for points scored, field goals made, and rebounds recovered. She led the Terrapins to three ACC titles and one NCAA Final Four. In 1989, Bullett was named ACC Tournament MVP, ACC Player of the Year, and a Kodak All-American. She was also chosen for the All-ACC First Team in 1987, 1988, and 1989.

Bullett graduated from Maryland with a bachelor's degree in general studies. In 2001, she returned to school and earned an additional degree in social work. In 2015, she graduated from the United States Sports Academy with a master's degree in sports coaching.

After she graduated, the University of Maryland honored Bullett by retiring her jersey (#23). She was also named a member of the ACC Women's Basketball 50th Anniversary team in 2003. In 2007, Bullett was named an ACC Women's Basketball Legend. She is also a member of the Maryland Athletics Walk of Fame.

Fellow left-handed forward Crystal Langhorne in 2007-2008 broke many of Bullett's Maryland career records.

== USA Basketball ==
Bullett was selected to the 1988 and 1992 United States Olympic Teams, which won gold (1988) and bronze medals (1992). She also played on the 1986 USA Select (junior national) team, the United States team which won the gold medal at the 1990 World Championships, and the United States team for the 1990 Goodwill Games.

Bullett was a member of the USA National team at the 1990 World Championships, held in Kuala Lumpur, Malaysia. The team won their opening round games fairly easily, with the closest of the first three games a 27-point victory over Czechoslovakia. Then they faced Cuba, a team that had beaten the US in exhibition matches only a few weeks earlier. The USA team was losing at halftime, but came back to win 87–78. The USA team found itself behind at halftime to Canada in their next game, but came back to win easily 95–70. After an easy match against Bulgaria, the USA team faced Czechoslovakia again, end achieved an almost identical result, winning 87–59. In the title match, the USA team won the gold medal with a score of 88–78. Bullett averaged 9.5 points per game.

== Professional career ==
=== WNBA ===
When the WNBA was founded in 1997, Bullett was assigned by the league to the Charlotte Sting in the Initial Player Allocation phase of the draft. Her debut game was played on June 22, 1997 in a 59 - 76 loss to the Phoenix Mercury. Despite the loss, Bullett recorded 8 points, 3 rebounds, 2 assists and 3 steals. Over the next three seasons, Bullett started in all 90 of the Sting's games and averaged more than 10 points per game. In all three seasons, the Sting reached the WNBA Playoffs. In 1999, Bullett was named as a reserve to the inaugural WNBA Eastern Conference All-Star team, and played in the All-Star Game as a substitute for the injured Rebecca Lobo.

In January 2000, Bullett was traded to the Washington Mystics for Shalonda Enis and a 2000 3rd-round pick (later turned out to be Jill Morton, who ended up never playing in the WNBA). Over the next three seasons, she started in all 96 of the Mystics' games. Bullett broke a WNBA record on July 3, 2001 by playing 55 minutes in the Mystics' quadruple-overtime victory over the Seattle Storm. Her cumulative WNBA accomplishments in six seasons included more than 800 field goals made, more than 1100 rebounds, more than 250 assists, more than 250 blocks, and more than 350 steals.

Bullett's final WNBA game was Game 3 of the 2002 Eastern Conference Finals against the New York Liberty on August 25, 2002. In that game, the Mystics lost to the Liberty 57 - 64 with Bullett recording two points, two rebounds, one assist and one steal.

=== Italy and Brazil ===
Bullett was also a renowned professional basketball player in Italy through much of the 1990s. She played for Bari from 1990 to 1993, then for Cesena from 1993 to 1997. Four times during her career, Bullett was named an All-Star for the Italian league. In addition, Bullett played several years in Brazil for the Data Control/Fluminense professional team, which won the Brazilian league championship in 1998.

== Coaching career ==
Bullett retired from the WNBA after the 2002 season, then retired from overseas professional play in 2007. She moved back to Martinsburg, West Virginia, which renamed the street where she grew up "Vicky Bullett Street" in her honor. She then taught for the Board of Education of Berkeley County, West Virginia and took graduate courses in education. She became a teacher at South Middle School in Martinsburg. In January 2009, the Washington Mystics hired Bullett as an assistant coach. In June 2009, the Mystics announced that Bullett would also take on the responsibilities of Manager of Basketball Operations.

In June 2011, Bullett was inducted into the Women's Basketball Hall of Fame in Knoxville, Tennessee along with Ruthie Bolton, Muffet McGraw, Val Ackerman, Pearl Moore, and Lometa Odem.

Since leaving the Mystics in 2009, Bullett has taken the head coaching job for the women's basketball team at Hagerstown Community College in Hagerstown Maryland. In 2011, she signed on as assistant coach to Dr. Marlys Palmer. As of March 2012 Bullett has taken over the many roles needed to coach a successful coaching position. On May 10, 2016, she was named as the head coach for the women's basketball team at West Virginia Wesleyan College.

== Career statistics ==
=== College ===
Legend
GP	Games played	GS	Games started	MPG	Minutes per game	RPG	Rebounds per game
APG	Assists per game	SPG	Steals per game	BPG	Blocks per game	PPG	Points per game
TO	Turnovers per game	FG%	Field-goal percentage	3P%	3-point field-goal percentage	FT%	Free-throw percentage
**Bold**	Career best	°	League leader

Year	Team	GP	Points	FG%	3P%	FT%	RPG	APG	SPG	BPG	PPG
1986	Maryland	21	218	47.0%	NA	72.1%	6.4	0.4	NA	NA	10.4
1987	Maryland	29	443	55.2%	NA	63.6%	8.4	1.4	NA	NA	15.3
1988	Maryland	**32**	581	**60.1%**	0.0%	70.9%	**9.5**	1.3	2.2	1.3	18.2
1989	Maryland	**32**	**686**	57.5%	0.0%	**79.4%**	9.0	**1.8**	**2.3**	**1.4**	**21.4**
Career		114	1928	56.3%	0.0%	72.5%	8.5	1.3	1.3	0.8	16.9

=== WNBA ===
==== Regular season ====
Year	Team	GP	GS	MPG	FG%	3P%	FT%	RPG	APG	SPG	BPG	TO	PPG
1997	Charlotte	28°	28°	31.3	.448	.304	.775	6.4	**2.3**	1.9	**2.0**	2.4	12.8
1998	Charlotte	30°	30°	31.6	.441	.154	.826	6.5	1.5	**2.2**	1.5	2.1	**13.3**
1999	Charlotte	**32**°	**32**°	31.5	**.486**	.370	.773	6.8	1.6	1.9	1.4	1.9	11.5
2000	Washington	**32**°	**32**°	**34.2**	**.486**	.324	.714	5.7	1.3	2.0	1.5	1.8	10.7
2001	Washington	**32**°	**32**°	33.5	.392	.297	.729	**7.2**	1.3	1.7	1.8	**1.7**	8.7
2002	Washington	**32**°	**32**°	29.8	.462	**.396**	**.829**	5.8	1.7	1.7	1.2	1.8	8.5
Career	6 years, 2 teams	186	186	32.0	.452	.315	.776	6.4	1.6	1.9	1.5	1.9	10.8

==== Playoffs ====
Year	Team	GP	GS	MPG	FG%	3P%	FT%	RPG	APG	SPG	BPG	TO	PPG
1997	Charlotte	1	1	**40.0**	.417	.000	–	**9.0**	2.0	**3.0**	**4.0**	3.0	10.0
1998	Charlotte	2	2	34.5	.250	.000	**1.000**	6.0	**4.0**	3.0	1.5	**0.5**	8.0
1999	Charlotte	4	4	30.4	.406	.333	.500	6.5	2.0	1.8	2.3	2.0	7.3
2000	Washington	2	2	34.5	**.500**	**.571**	**1.000**	4.5	1.5	2.5	2.5	1.0	**15.0**
2002	Washington	**5**	**5**	22.0	.407	.143	**1.000**	3.0	.8	1.6	1.0	1.2	5.0
Career	5 years, 2 teams	14	14	29.2	.391	.300	.875	5.1	1.8	2.1	1.9	1.4	7.9
