= Rhonda Mapp =

American basketball player (born 1969)

Personal information
- Born: October 13, 1969 (age 57) Asheville, North Carolina, U.S.
- Listed height: 6 ft 2 in (1.88 m)
- Listed weight: 190 lb (86 kg)

Career information
- High school: Asheville (Asheville, North Carolina)
- College: NC State (1988–1992)
- WNBA draft: 1997: Elite Draft
- Drafted by: Charlotte Sting
- Position: Center

Career history
- 1997–2000: Charlotte Sting
- 2001, 2003: Los Angeles Sparks
- Stats at Basketball Reference

Rhonda Mapp (born October 13, 1969) is an American former professional basketball player. She played six years of professional basketball overseas before joining the WNBA in 1997. After her time in the WNBA, Mapp continued to play overseas, including time in Spain, Italy, France, Turkey, Israel, and Korea.

== Early life ==
Mapp led Asheville to a state-championship in 1987 and has her jersey (No. 51) retired at the school. She still holds the school record for rebounds in a season (514) and career (1,032).

== College career ==
A dominant low-post player, Rhonda Mapp was named to the first-team All-ACC squad in 1991 and 1992. Mapp helped lead the Wolfpack to a three-year record of 67-25 as well as NCAA Tournament appearances in 1989 and 1991. In 1991, she helped lead the Wolfpack to win the ACC Championship and was named to the first-team All-tournament team and shot 57.6 percent for the season State finished with a No. 7 final national ranking by the Associated Press and 10th by USA Today. In her final season in 1992, Mapp led the ACC in scoring (22.0) and rebounding (9.8) and finished her collegiate career with 1,553 points, which still ranks 10th on the Wolfpack career scoring list. She also ranks 5th at NC State in career scoring average (17.6), 9th in career field goals made (625), 4th in career field goal percentage (.578), 9th in rebounds (810) and 6th in career double-doubles (37). Played five seasons professionally in the WNBA with the Charlotte Sting (1997–99) and Los Angeles Sparks (2001, 2003).

=== NC State statistics ===
Legend
GP	Games played	GS	Games started	MPG	Minutes per game
FG%	Field goal percentage	3P%	3-point field goal percentage	FT%	Free throw percentage
RPG	Rebounds per game	APG	Assists per game	SPG	Steals per game
BPG	Blocks per game	PPG	Points per game	**Bold**	Career high

Year	Team	GP	Points	FG%	3P%	FT%	RPG	APG	SPG	BPG	PPG
1988-89	NC State	29	416	**64.4%**	0.0%	**71.5%**	8.2	1.8	1.1	0.7	14.3
1990-91	NC State	32	542	57.6%	**41.7%**	70.1%	9.6	3.2	**1.2**	**1.0**	16.9
1991-92	NC State	27	**595**	53.9%	36.4%	69.5%	**9.8**	**2.4**	1.1	0.4	**22.0**°
Total		88	1553	57.8%	37.3%	70.2%	9.2	2.5	1.1	0.7	17.6

== WNBA ==
Mapp was the third pick in the 1997 WNBA Elite Draft selected by the Charlotte Sting. Her debut game was played on June 22, 1997 in a 59 - 76 loss to the Phoenix Mercury where she recorded 10 points, 6 rebounds, 1 assist and 1 block.

As a member of the Sting, Mapp played in 109 games, starting in 93 of them and averaged 10.8 points, 5.9 rebounds and 2 assists in 25.8 minutes per game. The club made it to the playoffs in the first 3 of the 4 years Mapp was a player, and were eliminated in the semi-finals in 1997 and 1998. In the 1999 season however, the Sting made it to the Eastern Conference Finals. And despite Mapp averaging 8.6 points and 6.3 rebounds in the ECF, the Sting were eliminated by the New York Liberty.

After four seasons in Charlotte, Mapp was traded to the Los Angeles Sparks along with E.C. Hill, in exchange for Allison Feaster and Clarisse Machanguana on October 11, 2000. Her first season with the Sparks was also her first season completely as a role player, as Mapp did not start a single game out of the 30 she played in the 2001 season. After averaging 4.2 points and 2.6 rebounds as a reserve, the Sparks finished the season 28 - 4 and reached the WNBA Finals against Mapp's former team, the Charlotte Sting. In that Finals series, Mapp only played in Game 2 and recorded 4 points and 2 rebounds as the Sparks swept the Sting 2 - 0.

Although the Sparks would repeat as WNBA Champions in 2002, Mapp missed the entire 2002 season because of unspecified personal reasons.

In 2003, Mapp became the first player to be dismissed for violation of the league's anti-drug program. She still played for the Sparks that season, starting in 4 of her 24 games and averaged 2.6 points and 2.8 rebounds in 10.6 minutes (her lowest minutes per game average in her career). The Sparks finished 24 - 10 and made it to the Finals, however, due to Mapp's suspension, she missed the last 4 games of the regular season and did not play in the playoffs at all.

Mapp's final WNBA game ever ended up being the last game she played during that 2003 Sparks season. The game was played on August 14, 2003 in a 87 - 83 win over the Minnesota Lynx as Mapp recorded 2 points, 1 rebound and 2 blocks.

=== WNBA stats - per game averages ===
Legend
GP	Games played	GS	Games started	MPG	Minutes per game	RPG	Rebounds per game
APG	Assists per game	SPG	Steals per game	BPG	Blocks per game	PPG	Points per game
TO	Turnovers per game	FG%	Field-goal percentage	3P%	3-point field-goal percentage	FT%	Free-throw percentage
**Bold**	Career best	°	League leader

==== Regular season ====
Year	Team	GP	GS	MPG	FG%	3P%	FT%	RPG	APG	SPG	BPG	TO	PPG
1997	Charlotte	28	23	25.4	.492	**.500**	.774	5.5	**2.3**	0.8	0.4	**2.4**	11.6
1998	Charlotte	21	14	21.7	**.506**	.100	.750	4.2	1.6	0.6	0.4	1.9	10.1
1999	Charlotte	**30**	26	26.3	.500	.111	.721	6.4	1.9	0.8	0.4	2.0	9.5
2000	Charlotte	**30**	**30**	**28.5**	.460	.364	**.830**	**6.8**	2.1	**1.0**	**0.8**	2.0	**11.9**
2001^{†}	Los Angeles	**30**	0	13.2	.415	.000	.750	2.6	0.5	0.5	0.2	0.8	4.2
2003	Los Angeles	24	4	10.6	.500	.000	.500	2.8	0.3	0.3	0.3	0.5	2.6
Career	6 years, 2 teams	163	97	21.2	.479	.264	.768	4.8	1.5	0.7	0.4	1.6	8.4

==== Playoffs ====
Year	Team	GP	GS	MPG	FG%	3P%	FT%	RPG	APG	SPG	BPG	TO	PPG
1997	Charlotte	1	1	**36.0**	.333	—	**1.000**	**7.0**	**3.0**	**1.0**	0.0	**2.0**	12.0
1998	Charlotte	2	2	32.5	**.571**	.000	**1.000**	**7.0**	1.0	0.0	**0.5**	1.0	**13.5**
1999	Charlotte	4	**4**	30.3	.531	**.333**	.538	**7.0**	1.0	0.3	0.0	**2.0**	10.5
2001^{†}	Los Angeles	**5**	0	5.4	.333	—	—	1.4	0.6	0.0	0.0	0.4	1.2
Career	4 years, 2 teams	12	7	20.8	.486	.250	.700	4.7	1.0	0.2	0.1	1.2	7.3

== Coaching career ==
Mapp was hired as the coach at Queen's Grant High School in Matthews, North Carolina. Queen's Grant is a charter school for students in the Charlotte-Mecklenburg County area and has an enrollment of about 500.

== Personal life ==
Mapp has a father named Kenneth. In 1998, she founded the nonprofit Follow Your Dreams Inc.
