= Tora Suber =

American basketball player

Personal information
- Born: November 23, 1974 (age 51) Coatesville, Pennsylvania, U.S.
- Listed height: 5 ft 7 in (1.70 m)
- Listed weight: 137 lb (62 kg)

Career information
- High school: Downingtown (Downingtown, Pennsylvania)
- College: Virginia (1993–1997)
- WNBA draft: 1997: 1st round, 7th overall pick
- Drafted by: Charlotte Sting
- Playing career: 1997–1999
- Position: Guard

Career history
- 1997–1998: Charlotte Sting
- 1999: Orlando Miracle

Career highlights
- 2× First-team All-ACC (1996, 1997); ACC Rookie of the Year (1994); ACC All-Freshman Team (1994)
- Stats at WNBA.com
- Stats at Basketball Reference

Tora Suber (born November 23, 1974) is an American former professional basketball player who played for the Charlotte Sting and Orlando Miracle in the WNBA. She played a total of 83 games.

== High school ==
Suber and Tina Nicholson were teammates at Downingtown High School in the early 1990s. Suber graduated in 1993. In total she recorded 2,420 career points and helped the team win four District 1 titles and two state crowns.

== WNBA career ==
On April 28, 1997, Suber was selected with the 7th overall pick of the 1997 WNBA draft by the Charlotte Sting. Her debut game was played on June 22, 1997 in a 59 - 76 loss to the Phoenix Mercury where she recorded 6 points, 3 rebounds and 2 steals. Suber would play her rookie and sophomore seasons as a member of the Sting, playing in 58 games, scoring a total of 321 points, 142 assists and 95 rebounds. She was waived by the Sting on May 29, 1999.

After being waived by the Sting, Suber would go on to play her 3rd season with the Orlando Miracle. However, she had a significantly less role and although she played in 25 games, she only averaged 4.6 minutes per game and averaged 0.8 points.

=== Unsuccessful WNBA Comeback Attempts ===
After playing the 1999 season with the Miracle, Suber would never play in the WNBA again, but she did sign multiple contracts for teams in the early 2000's. One of those teams coincidentally being the Orlando Miracle. Suber would sign with the Miracle on May 3, 2001 but would get waived 8 days later on May 11, 2001. Since she missed out on the 2001 season, Suber would try her luck again in the 2002 WNBA season by signing with the Houston Comets, even participating in the team's Media Day on April 29, 2002. Unfortunately, she would never play a game for the Comets and would be waived on May 8, 2002.

Two years later in April 2004, Suber tried another comeback by signing once again with the Houston Comets as a free agent. However, she was waived a few weeks later on May 9, 2004

Due to her 2001, 2002 and 2004 comebacks not coming to fruition, Suber's final WNBA game was the last game of the 1999 season as a member of the Miracle. That game was played on August 21, 1999 in a 68 - 74 loss to the Detroit Shock where Suber only played for 13 seconds. This game was also the final career game of fellow 1997 WNBA Draftee Wanda Guyton, who was a member of the Shock.

== Personal life ==
Suber was born prematurely to a 15-year-old mother. She earned a bachelor's degree in English literature at Virginia.

== Career statistics ==
Legend
GP	Games played	GS	Games started	MPG	Minutes per game	RPG	Rebounds per game
APG	Assists per game	SPG	Steals per game	BPG	Blocks per game	PPG	Points per game
TO	Turnovers per game	FG%	Field-goal percentage	3P%	3-point field-goal percentage	FT%	Free-throw percentage
**Bold**	Career best	°	League leader

=== Regular season ===
Year	Team	GP	GS	MPG	FG%	3P%	FT%	RPG	APG	SPG	BPG	TO	PPG
1997	Charlotte	28	8	17.0	**.370**	**.397**	**.683**	1.5	2.0	0.5	**0.1**	1.8	4.7
1998	Charlotte	**30**	**12**	**22.7**	.314	.310	.630	**1.8**	**2.9**	**1.0**	0.0	1.5	**6.0**
1999	Orlando	25	0	4.6	.292	.111	.500	0.5	0.4	0.2	0.0	**0.4**	0.8
Career	3 years, 2 teams	83	20	15.3	.331	.328	.639	1.3	1.8	0.6	0.0	1.3	4.0

=== Playoffs ===
Year	Team	GP	GS	MPG	FG%	3P%	FT%	RPG	APG	SPG	BPG	TO	PPG
1997	Charlotte	1	0	7.0	.000	—	—	0.0	1.0	0.0	0.0	**1.0**	0.0
1998	Charlotte	**2**	**2**	**37.5**	**.391**	**.250**	**.667**	**1.0**	**5.0**	**2.5**	0.0	3.5	**11.5**
Career	2 years, 1 team	3	2	27.0	.375	.250	.667	0.7	3.7	1.7	0.0	2.7	7.7
