= Christy Smith (basketball) =

American basketball player

Personal information
- Born: August 14, 1975 (age 51) Miami, Florida, U.S.
- Listed height: 5 ft 7 in (1.70 m)
- Listed weight: 141 lb (64 kg)

Career information
- High school: Benton Central (Oxford, Indiana)
- College: Arkansas (1994–1998)
- WNBA draft: 1998: 2nd round, 17th overall pick
- Drafted by: Charlotte Sting
- Position: Guard

Career history

Playing
- 1998–1999: Charlotte Sting

Coaching
- 2008–2011: Valparaiso (assistant)
- 2011–2014: Purdue (assistant)
- 2014–2016: Arkansas (assistant)
- 2016–2019: Incarnate Word

Career highlights
- as a player: 4× AP All-American (1995–1998); First-team All-SEC (1998); SEC Freshman of the Year (1995); SEC All-Freshman Team (1995)
- Stats at Basketball Reference
Medals
Women's basketball
World University Games
Gold medal – first place	1997 Marsala	Team competition

Christina Marie Smith (born August 14, 1975) is an American former professional basketball player who played for the Charlotte Sting of the Women's National Basketball Association (WNBA).

== Playing career ==
=== University of Arkansas ===
Smith helped lead the Arkansas Razorbacks to the 1998 NCAA Division I Final Four. She left Arkansas as its ninth all-time leading scorer (1459 points), third all-time in assists (507), and second all-time in steals (239). In the 1994–95 season she led the nation in highest free throw percentage (89.9). She was named to the SEC Academic Honor Roll three times. She was inducted into the University of Arkansas Hall of Honor in 2005, the fifth women's basketball player at the time to receive the honor.

==== Arkansas statistics ====
Legend
GP	Games played	GS	Games started	MPG	Minutes per game	RPG	Rebounds per game
APG	Assists per game	SPG	Steals per game	BPG	Blocks per game	PPG	Points per game
TO	Turnovers per game	FG%	Field-goal percentage	3P%	3-point field-goal percentage	FT%	Free-throw percentage
**Bold**	Career best	°	League leader

Year	Team	GP	GS	Min	MPG	Points	PPG	RBS	RPG	FG%	3P%	FT%	APG	SPG	BPG
1994–95	Arkansas	30	30	1126	**37.5**	**408**	13.6	76	**2.5**	38.1%	35.4%	**89.9%**	4.4	**3.0**	**0.1**
1995–96	Arkansas	22	22	781	35.5	363	**16.5**	73	3.3	**40.2%**	30.4%	79.7%	4.4	2.0	0.0
1996–97	Arkansas	28	27	920	32.9	343	12.3	68	2.4	36.6%	33.6%	81.0%	4.7	1.9	0.0
1997–98	Arkansas	**31**	**31**	**1133**	36.5	345	11.1	**77**	2.5	36.5%	**34.5%**	83.2%	**4.7**	1.7	0.1
Career		111	110	3960	35.7	1459	13.1	294	2.7	37.9%	33.6%	83.7%	4.6	2.2	0.1

=== Charlotte Sting ===
Smith played for the Sting for two years, appearing in 28 total games.

==== WNBA statistics ====
Legend
GP	Games played	GS	Games started	MPG	Minutes per game	RPG	Rebounds per game
APG	Assists per game	SPG	Steals per game	BPG	Blocks per game	PPG	Points per game
TO	Turnovers per game	FG%	Field-goal percentage	3P%	3-point field-goal percentage	FT%	Free-throw percentage
**Bold**	Career best	°	League leader

===== Regular season =====
Year	Team	GP	GS	MPG	FG%	3P%	FT%	RPG	APG	SPG	BPG	TO	PPG
1998	Charlotte	**24**	**18**	**18.7**	.360	.316	**.850**	**1.4**	**3.0**	**0.4**	0.0	2.0	**3.7**
1999	Charlotte	4	0	4.8	**.750**	**.667**	.833	0.3	0.3	0.3	0.0	**0.3**	3.3
Career	2 years, 1 team	28	18	16.7	.380	.333	.846	1.3	2.6	0.4	0.0	1.8	3.6

===== Playoffs =====
Year	Team	GP	GS	MPG	FG%	3P%	FT%	RPG	APG	SPG	BPG	TO	PPG
1998	Charlotte	2	0	9.5	.167	.000	.250	0.5	0.5	0.0	0.0	0.0	1.5

== Coaching career ==
Smith served as assistant coach of Jefferson High School women's basketball team the year before becoming head coach of William Henry Harrison High School's women's basketball team during their 2007–2008 season. Smith joined the staff of Valparaiso University in August 2008 as an assistant coach. During her tenure she assisted with the team's recruiting.

Smith was an assistant coach at Purdue and helped lead the team to the straight NCAA Tournament second round appearances. During her tenure, the team went 77–27. Smith joined the coaching staff at Arkansas in 2014 as an assistant coach. She left after two seasons with the Razorbacks.

Smith became the head coach of the Incarnate Word Cardinals women's basketball team in 2016.

== Honors and awards ==
=== College ===
- Women's Basketball News Service, 2nd team (1994–95)
- WBNS Freshman All-America, 1st team (1994–95)
- ESPN Basketball Top 5 (1995–96)
- Women's Basketball News Service, 2nd team preseason All-America (1995–96)
- Women's BB News Service; Athlon Sports, Lindy's, 2nd team preseason All-American (1996–97)
- Women's Basketball News Service All-American 2nd team (1997–98)
- WBNS preseason All-American (1997–98)

== Personal life ==
Smith earned a bachelor's degree in exercise science from University of Arkansas in 1998 and a master's degree in 2001 in biomechanics. She has three children.
