= Pollyanna Johns Kimbrough =

American-Bahamian basketball player (born 1975)

Personal information
- Born: November 6, 1975 (age 51) Nassau, Bahamas
- Listed height: 6 ft 3 in (1.91 m)
- Listed weight: 165 lb (75 kg)

Career information
- High school: Evanston Township (Evanston, Illinois)
- College: Michigan (1994–1998)
- WNBA draft: 1998: 3rd round, 27th overall pick
- Drafted by: Charlotte Sting
- Position: Center
- Number: 41

Career history
- 1998: Charlotte Sting
- 2000–2001: Cleveland Rockers
- 2002: Miami Sol
- 2003: Cleveland Rockers
- 2004: Houston Comets

Career highlights
- First-team All-Big Ten (1998)
- Stats at Basketball Reference

Pollyanna Casanga Johns Kimbrough, formerly Pollyanna Johns (born November 6, 1975) is an American former basketball player. She was born in Nassau, Bahamas, grew up in Jamaica and moved to the United States at age 13. She played for six seasons as a center and forward in the WNBA for the Charlotte Sting (1998), Cleveland Rockers (2000-2001, 2003), Miami Sol (2002), and Houston Comets (2004).

Johns Kimbrough also played college basketball at the University of Michigan from 1994 to 1998. She led the Michigan Wolverines women's basketball team in both scoring and rebounds for three consecutive years (1996-1998) and continues to hold the school records for career shooting percentage (.552), single-season shooting percentage (.662 in the 1997–98 season), and career rebounding percentage (9.6 per game).

== Early years ==
Johns Kimbrough was born in the Bahamas, moved to Jamaica when she was 1 and moved to the United States with her family at age 13. She played high school basketball at Evanston Township High School in Evanston, Illinois.

== College career ==
Johns Kimbrough played college basketball for the Michigan Wolverines women's basketball team from 1994 to 1998. In four seasons at Michigan, she converted 477 of 864 field goals (.552) and 297 of 492 free throw attempts (.604), scored 1,251 points, and averaged 14.5 points per game. She holds Michigan's career records for field goal percentage (.552) and rebounding average (9.6 per game), the single-season record for field goal percentage (.662 in the 1997–98 season), and single-game field goal percentage (eight for eight against Iowa on 1/26/97). Her career total of 827 rebounds ranks third in Michigan women's basketball history.

As a freshman during the 1994–95 season, Johns Kimbrough averaged 6.8 rebounds a game, the third best rebounding average by a freshman in Michigan women's basketball history.

As a sophomore during the 1995–96 season, she led the team in both scoring and rebounds. She totaled 349 points (14.5 per game) and 238 rebounds (9.9 per game). She was selected by the media as a second-team All-Big Ten Conference player.

As a junior during the 1996–97 season, she again led the team in scoring and rebounds. She scored 375 points (15.0 per game) and had 261 rebounds (10.4 per game). Her junior rebounding total and average ranked as the third highest in Michigan women's basketball history. She also converted 149 of 262 field goals for a .569 shooting percentage that still ranks second all-time at Michigan behind her own performance during her senior season. She was also picked by both the coaches and the media as a second-team All-Big Ten player in 1997.

As a senior during the 1997–98 season, she led the team for the third consecutive year in both scoring and rebounds. She scored 482 points (17.2 per game) and 267 rebounds (9.5 per game). She converted 176 of 283 field goals for a school record .662 shooting percentage. She also converted 130 free throws, which at the time was Michigan's single-season record. She was selected as a first-team All-Big Ten player by both the coaches and media in 1998.

== Professional career ==
In April 1998, the Charlotte Sting selected John Kimbrough with the 27th overall pick in the 1998 WNBA draft. She was the first Michigan women's basketball player to be drafted by an American professional team. She played six years as a center and forward in the WNBA for the Charlotte Sting (1998), Cleveland Rockers (2000-2001, 2003), Miami Sol (2002), and Houston Comets (2004). She was principally a backup player, but she started 30 games for the Sol in 2002 after an injury to Yelena Baranova. She had career highs in 2002 with 217 points, 140 rebounds, 32 assists, and 27 steals. The Sol became defunct after the 2002 season, and Johns Kimbrough was selected by Charlotte Sting with the 10th pick in the WNBA dispersal draft in April 2003.

In six seasons in the WNBA, Johns Kimbrough appeared in 134 games and compiled a career total of 435 points, 333 rebounds, 64 assists, 46 steals, and 33 blocks.

In May 2004, the Comets placed Johns Kimbrough on the injured list with a chronic left knee injury. She did not return to the WNBA, but she did continue to play in Europe. She played three seasons in Italy's LegA Basket Femminile for the Phard Napoli (2003/2004), Coconuda Maddaloni (2004/2005), and Phard Napoli (2005/2006). In 2005, she also played for the Pécs team in the Hungary League.

== Career statistics ==
=== WNBA ===
==== Regular season ====
Year	Team	GP	GS	MPG	FG%	3P%	FT%	RPG	APG	SPG	BPG	TO	PPG
1998	Charlotte	24	0	7.5	.489	–	.643	1.5	.3	.1	.1	.4	2.6
2000	Cleveland	12	0	4.8	.500	–	.583	1.2	.2	.0	.1	.7	1.4
2001	Cleveland	18	0	6.6	.444	–	.444	1.7	.2	.0	.1	.6	2.6
2002	Miami	31	30	25.8	.523	–	.629	4.5	1.0	.9	.5	1.7	7.0
2003	Cleveland	30	2	13.9	.556	–	.576	2.7	.6	.4	.3	.6	3.0
2004	Houston	19	0	8.3	.176	–	.762	1.5	.1	.2	.2	.4	1.2
Career	6 years, 4 teams	134	32	12.9	.498	–	.625	2.5	.5	.3	.2	.8	3.2

==== Playoffs ====
Year	Team	GP	GS	MPG	FG%	3P%	FT%	RPG	APG	SPG	BPG	TO	PPG
2000	Cleveland	4	0	1.5	1.000	–	.500	.5	.3	.0	.0	.0	1.8
2001	Cleveland	1	0	4.0	–	–	–	2.0	1.0	.0	.0	1.0	.0
2003	Cleveland	3	0	6.7	1.000	–	–	1.3	1.0	.3	.7	.0	.7
Career	3 years, 1 teams	8	0	3.8	1.000	–	.500	1.0	.6	.1	.3	.1	1.1

=== College ===
Year	Team	GP	GS	MPG	FG%	3P%	FT%	RPG	APG	SPG	BPG	TO	PPG
1994–95	Michigan	9	-	-	55.6	0.0	31.3	6.8	0.3	0.3	0.6	-	5.0
1995–96	Michigan	24	-	-	46.6	0.0	57.0	9.9	1.3	0.9	0.8	-	14.5
1996–97	Michigan	25	-	-	56.9	0.0	57.0	10.4	1.1	0.7	0.8	-	15.0
1997–98	Michigan	28	-	-	62.2	0.0	67.7	9.5	0.8	1.1	0.6	-	17.2
Career		86	-	-	55.2	0.0	60.4	9.6	1.0	0.8	0.7	-	14.5
Statistics retrieved from Sports-Reference.
