= Tia Paschal =

American basketball player

Personal information
- Born: March 22, 1969 (age 57) Thomson, Georgia, U.S.
- Listed height: 6 ft 1 in (1.85 m)

Career information
- High school: Thomson High School; Thomson, Georgia
- College: Florida State (1989–1993)
- Position: Forward

Career history
- 1998: Charlotte Sting

Career highlights
- First-team All-ACC (1993)
- Stats at Basketball Reference

Tia Paschal (born March 22, 1969) is an American retired women's basketball player. Paschal played collegiately at Florida State University (FSU). She was a 3-year starter for FSU, from 1989 to 1993. Over her career, she helped lead the team to two consecutive NCAA Tournament appearances: in 1989-90 and 1990–91, as well as a Metro Conference championship in the 1990–91 season.

Paschal held the records for points in a game (38), free throws made (14) and attempted (19) in a game, as well as steals in a season (96) and career (269). She was also among FSU's top 10 in six season and seven career records and ranked second all-time in scoring with 1,662 points.

== Professional ==
Paschal played with the Charlotte Sting during the 1998 WNBA season as well as abroad with teams in Germany, Spain and Sweden.

== Career statistics ==
=== WNBA ===
Legend
GP	Games played	GS	Games started	MPG	Minutes per game	RPG	Rebounds per game
APG	Assists per game	SPG	Steals per game	BPG	Blocks per game	PPG	Points per game
TO	Turnovers per game	FG%	Field-goal percentage	3P%	3-point field-goal percentage	FT%	Free-throw percentage
**Bold**	Career best	°	League leader

==== Regular season ====
Year	Team	GP	GS	MPG	FG%	3P%	FT%	RPG	APG	SPG	BPG	TO	PPG
1998	Charlotte	20	0	5.5	29.7	25.0	66.7	0.8	0.5	0.4	0.0	0.6	1.4
Career	1 year, 1 team	20	0	5.5	29.7	25.0	66.7	0.8	0.5	0.4	0.0	0.6	1.4

=== College ===
Year	Team	GP	GS	MPG	FG%	3P%	FT%	RPG	APG	SPG	BPG	TO	PPG
1989–90	Florida State	29	-	-	44.4	31.6	59.4	4.7	0.7	1.3	0.3	-	8.7
1990–91	Florida State	**32**	-	-	51.3	0.0	71.6	5.4	2.4	2.3	0.1	-	13.9
1991–92	Florida State	28	-	-	50.4	14.3	**73.7**	6.9	**2.7**	2.1	0.0	-	15.7
1992–93	Florida State	27	-	-	**52.4**	**33.3**	71.6	**7.4**	1.7	**3.6**	**0.5**	-	**19.4**
**Career**		116	-	-	50.2	21.7	70.3	6.1	1.9	2.3	0.2	-	14.3
Statistics retrieved from Sports-Reference.
