= Andrea Congreaves =

English basketball player

Personal information
- Born: 3 June 1970 (age 56) Epsom, Surrey, England
- Listed height: 6 ft 4 in (1.93 m)
- Listed weight: 183 lb (83 kg)

Career information
- High school: Carshalton High School for Girls (London, England)
- College: Mercer (1989–1993)
- WNBA draft: 1997: 4th round, 26th overall pick
- Drafted by: Charlotte Sting
- Playing career: 1997–2011
- Position: Power forward / Centre
- Number: 3, 11

Career history
- 1997–1998: Charlotte Sting
- 1999: Orlando Miracle
- 1999–2000: CJM Bourges Basket
- 2000–2001: Priolo
- 2001–2002: Gran Canaria
- 2002: Kumho Falcons
- 2002–2004: Barcelona
- 2004–2005: Alessandria
- 2005–2009: Rhondda Rebels
- 2010–2011: Nottingham Wildcats

Career highlights
- Kodak All-American (1993); 3× TAAC Player of the Year (1991–1993); 3× First-team All-TAAC (1991–1993); 2x NCAA season scoring leader (1992, 1993)
- Stats at Basketball Reference
Medals
Women's basketball
Representing England
Commonwealth Games
Bronze medal – third place	2006 Melbourne	Team competition

Andrea Congreaves (born 3 June 1970) is a British former basketball player born in Epsom, Surrey who played professionally for the women's England's national team while also playing in the United States, France, Italy, Spain, Turkey and Britain throughout her career. She is the former head coach of the Rhondda Rebels of the English Women's Basketball League (Division 1), and the current head coach of the Mansfield Giants of the English Basketball League (Division 2) as well as the women's team of the University of Nottingham.

== College career ==
Congreaves graduated from Carshalton High School for Girls in Carshalton, Sutton, in 1986. She played for the Carshalton High School girls' basketball team, and through a connection with her high school coach was eventually offered an athletic scholarship to attend university in the United States.

Congreaves enrolled in Mercer University, an American private liberal arts college located in Macon, Georgia. While attending Mercer, she played for the Mercer Bears women's basketball team – the university's varsity women's team – from 1989 to 1993, and led the Lady Bears to two regular season championships in the Atlantic Sun Conference (1991, 1992). As a junior in 1991–92, and again as a senior in 1992–93, she led National Collegiate Athletic Association (NCAA) Division I in scoring. She was a first-team all-conference selection in 1991, 1992 and 1993, and was the conference player of the year in 1992 and 1993. After her senior season in 1992–93, she was selected as an All-American by the Women's Basketball Coaches Association (WBCA) – recognising her as one of the top ten women players in NCAA Division I college basketball.

Congreaves graduated from Mercer University with a four-year bachelor of arts degree in 1993, and was inducted into the university's athletic hall of fame in 2013.

== WNBA career ==
Congreaves was the first-ever British sportswoman to play in the Women's National Basketball Association (WNBA), the highest level professional league for women basketball players in the United States. She was drafted in the fourth round (26th pick overall) of the 1997 WNBA draft by the Charlotte Sting and played her debut game on June 22, 1997. On that day, the Sting loss to the Phoenix Mercury 59 - 76 although Congreaves was able to record 6 points and a rebound. The Sting finished the season 15 - 13 and made the playoffs but were eliminated in the semi-finals by the Houston Comets.

The next season, Congreaves played less minutes per game than her rookie season (going from 23.5 to 15.5 minutes) and thus had lower productivity across the board. However, she was still able to average a helpful 4.3 points, 3 rebounds and 1.5 assists and helped the Sting improve to a 18 - 12 record. Even with the better record, the Sting were once again eliminated in the playoff semi-finals by the Comets.

On April 6, 1999, Congreaves was selected in the 1999 expansion draft by the newly formed Orlando Miracle. She started in all 32 games of the season and averaged the highest minutes per game of her career (25.4). Even though the Miracle won 5 of their last 6 season games, they finished the season 15 - 17 and fell short of the playoff picture (making it Congreaves' first time missing the playoffs).

Congreaves did not play again in the WNBA after the 1999 season, but she would repeatedly sign contracts with the Miracle and then get subsequently waived by the team. On May 22, 2001, she was waived by the Miracle before the season started. And then a year later on May 24, 2002, she would be waived by the Miracle again after resigning but not playing a game for the team. Her final WNBA game was thus the last game of the 1999 regular season on August 21, 1999. The Orlando Miracle would lose to the Detroit Shock 68 - 74 in that game with Congreaves recording 3 rebounds, 1 assist, 1 steal and 1 block.

During her three WNBA seasons, she appeared in 84 of 90 games played by her teams, starting 58 of them, and scoring exactly 500 points in her career.

== Later career ==
Congreaves also enjoyed a successful European career in lengthy spells in Spain and Italy, as well as one-season stops in Turkey (where she contributed to the double championship of Fenerbahçe at the 1998–99 season) and France, before signing for the Rhondda Rebels for the 2005–06 season.

She was the key performer on England's national team that won the bronze medal in women's basketball at the 2006 Commonwealth Games in Melbourne, averaging 17.4 points and 9.4 rebounds per game. England defeated Nigeria 78–75 in the women's consolation final to claim third place in the Games.

== Mercer statistics ==
Legend
GP	Games played	GS	Games started	MPG	Minutes per game	FG%	Field goal percentage	3P%	3-point field goal percentage
FT%	Free throw percentage	RPG	Rebounds per game	APG	Assists per game	SPG	Steals per game	BPG	Blocks per game
TO	Turnovers per game	PPG	Points per game	**Bold**	Career high	*	Led Division I

Year	Team	GP	Points	FG%	3P%	FT%	RPG	APG	SPG	BPG	PPG
1990	Mercer	27	404	.552	.182	.667	10.6	1.3	1.5	**1.3**	15.0
1991	Mercer	27	662	**.633**	.359	.755	9.7	1.6	1.3	0.2	24.5
1992	Mercer	**28**	**925**	.583	**.416**	.717	**11.6**	1.6	2.4	0.6	***33.0**
1993	Mercer	26	805	.549	.323	**.833**	10.2	**1.6**	**2.4**	0.9	*31.0
Career		108	2,796	.580	.366	.753	10.6	1.5	1.9	0.8	25.9

== Career statistics ==
Legend
GP	Games played	GS	Games started	MPG	Minutes per game	RPG	Rebounds per game
APG	Assists per game	SPG	Steals per game	BPG	Blocks per game	PPG	Points per game
TO	Turnovers per game	FG%	Field-goal percentage	3P%	3-point field-goal percentage	FT%	Free-throw percentage
**Bold**	Career best	°	League leader

=== Regular season ===
Year	Team	GP	GS	MPG	FG%	3P%	FT%	RPG	APG	SPG	BPG	TO	PPG
1997	Charlotte	28	16	23.5	**.500**	**.409**	.768	**4.8**	**1.5**	0.6	**0.2**	1.1	**6.7**
1998	Charlotte	24	10	15.5	.432	.294	**.905**	3.0	**1.5**	0.5	**0.2**	**1.0**	4.3
1999	Orlando	**32**	**32**	**25.4**	**.500**	.366	.830	3.2	1.1	**0.8**	**0.2**	1.5	6.5
Career	3 years, 2 teams	84	58	21.9	.485	.353	.815	3.6	1.3	0.6	0.2	1.2	6.0

=== Playoffs ===
Year	Team	GP	GS	MPG	FG%	3P%	FT%	RPG	APG	SPG	BPG	TO	PPG
1997	Charlotte	**1**	**1**	**32.0**	**.571**	**.667**	**.500**	**3.0**	**1.0**	**1.0**	0.0	**1.0**	**12.0**
1998	Charlotte	**1**	0	6.0	.000	.000	—	1.0	0.0	0.0	**1.0**	2.0	0.0
Career	2 years, 1 team	2	1	19.0	.500	.500	.500	2.0	0.5	0.5	0.5	1.5	6.0

== See also ==
- List of NCAA Division I women's basketball season scoring leaders
- List of NCAA Division I women's basketball players with 2,500 points and 1,000 rebounds
