= Niesa Johnson =

American basketball player

Personal information
- Born: February 7, 1973 (age 53) Chicago, Illinois, U.S.
- Listed height: 5 ft 8 in (1.73 m)

Career information
- High school: Clinton (Clinton, Mississippi)
- College: Alabama (1991–1995)
- WNBA draft: 1999: undrafted
- Position: Guard

Career history
- 1999–2001: Charlotte Sting

Career highlights
- First-team All-American – AP (1995); 2x All-American – Kodak, USBWA (1994, 1995); 3x First-team All-SEC (1993–1995); USBWA National Freshman of the Year (1992); SEC Freshman of the Year (1992); SEC All-Freshman Team (1992); Mississippi Miss Basketball (1991)
- Stats at Basketball Reference
Medals
Women's basketball
Jones Cup
| Gold medal – first place | 1996 Taipei | Team competition |
FIBA Under-18 Americas Championship
| Silver medal – second place | 1996 Mexico | Team |

Niesa Evett Johnson (born February 7, 1973) is a retired American women's basketball player with the Charlotte Sting of the Women's National Basketball Association (WNBA) from 1999 to 2001.

== College ==
Johnson attended the University of Alabama and was a two-time All-American with the Crimson Tide. She was also a Naismith Award finalist. As of March 2006, Johnson had scored the second most points in Alabama women's basketball history. She helped the 6th seeded Alabama squad reach the 1994 Final Four. In 2006, Johnson was named to the 25th anniversary team of the Southeastern Conference.

== Career statistics ==
Legend
| GP | Games played | GS | Games started | MPG | Minutes per game | RPG | Rebounds per game |
| APG | Assists per game | SPG | Steals per game | BPG | Blocks per game | PPG | Points per game |
| TO | Turnovers per game | FG% | Field-goal percentage | 3P% | 3-point field-goal percentage | FT% | Free-throw percentage |
| **Bold** | Career best | ° | League leader |

=== WNBA ===
==== Regular season ====
| Year | Team | GP | GS | MPG | FG% | 3P% | FT% | RPG | APG | SPG | BPG | TO | PPG |
|---|---|---|---|---|---|---|---|---|---|---|---|---|---|
| 1999 | Charlotte | **31** | 0 | 9.5 | 30.0 | 26.1 | 91.7 | 0.6 | 1.4 | 0.3 | **0.1** | **0.9** | 1.5 |
| 2000 | Charlotte | 6 | 0 | **13.0** | **52.9** | **40.0** | **100.0** | **0.7** | **1.8** | **0.7** | 0.0 | 1.5 | **4.3** |
| Career | 2 years, 1 team | 37 | 0 | 10.1 | 35.8 | 28.6 | 94.4 | 0.6 | 1.5 | 0.4 | 0.1 | 1.0 | 2.0 |

==== Playoffs ====
| Year | Team | GP | GS | MPG | FG% | 3P% | FT% | RPG | APG | SPG | BPG | TO | PPG |
|---|---|---|---|---|---|---|---|---|---|---|---|---|---|
| 1999 | Charlotte | 4 | 0 | 14.3 | 12.5 | 0.0 | 0.0 | 1.0 | 2.0 | 1.0 | 0.0 | 0.3 | 0.5 |
| Career | 1 year, 1 team | 4 | 0 | 14.3 | 12.5 | 0.0 | 0.0 | 1.0 | 2.0 | 1.0 | 0.0 | 0.3 | 0.5 |

=== College ===
Legend
| GP | Games played | GS | Games started | MPG | Minutes per game |
| FG% | Field goal percentage | 3P% | 3-point field goal percentage | FT% | Free throw percentage |
| RPG | Rebounds per game | APG | Assists per game | SPG | Steals per game |
| BPG | Blocks per game | PPG | Points per game | **Bold** | Career high |

| Year | Team | GP | Points | FG% | 3P% | FT% | RPG | APG | SPG | BPG | PPG |
|---|---|---|---|---|---|---|---|---|---|---|---|
| 1991–92 | Alabama | 30 | 488 | 35.6% | 32.9% | 73.9% | 7.1 | 5.0 | 2.9 | 0.2 | 16.3 |
| 1992–93 | Alabama | 31 | 499 | 41.8% | 35.3% | 79.4% | 5.4 | **7.3** | **3.1** | 0.4 | 16.1 |
| 1993–94 | Alabama | **33** | 494 | 40.6% | 33.1% | 73.7% | 5.5 | 7.2 | 2.8 | **0.5** | 15.0 |
| 1994–95 | Alabama | 31 | **653** | **43.5%** | **37.5%** | **82.0%** | **6.0** | 6.0 | 2.5 | 0.4 | **21.1** |
| Career | | 125 | 2134 | 40.3% | 34.7% | 77.8% | 6.0 | 6.4 | 2.8 | 0.4 | 17.1 |

== USA Basketball ==
Johnson was named to the USA U18 team (then called the Junior World Championship Qualifying Team) in 1992. The team competed in Guanajuato, Mexico in August 1992. The team won their first four games, then lost 80–70 to Brazil, finishing with the silver medal for the event, but qualifying for the 1993 world games. Johnson averaged 9.6 points per game during the event.

Johnson continued with the team to the 1993 U19 World Championship (then called the Junior World Championship). The team won five games and lost two, but that left them in seventh place. Johnson averaged 8.6 points per game and recorded 12 assists, highest on the team.

Johnson was invited to play with the team representing the US at the 1996 William Jones Cup competition held in Taipei, Taiwan. The team won all nine games to win the gold medal. Johnson averaged 4.2 points per game.
