= List of WNBA seasons =

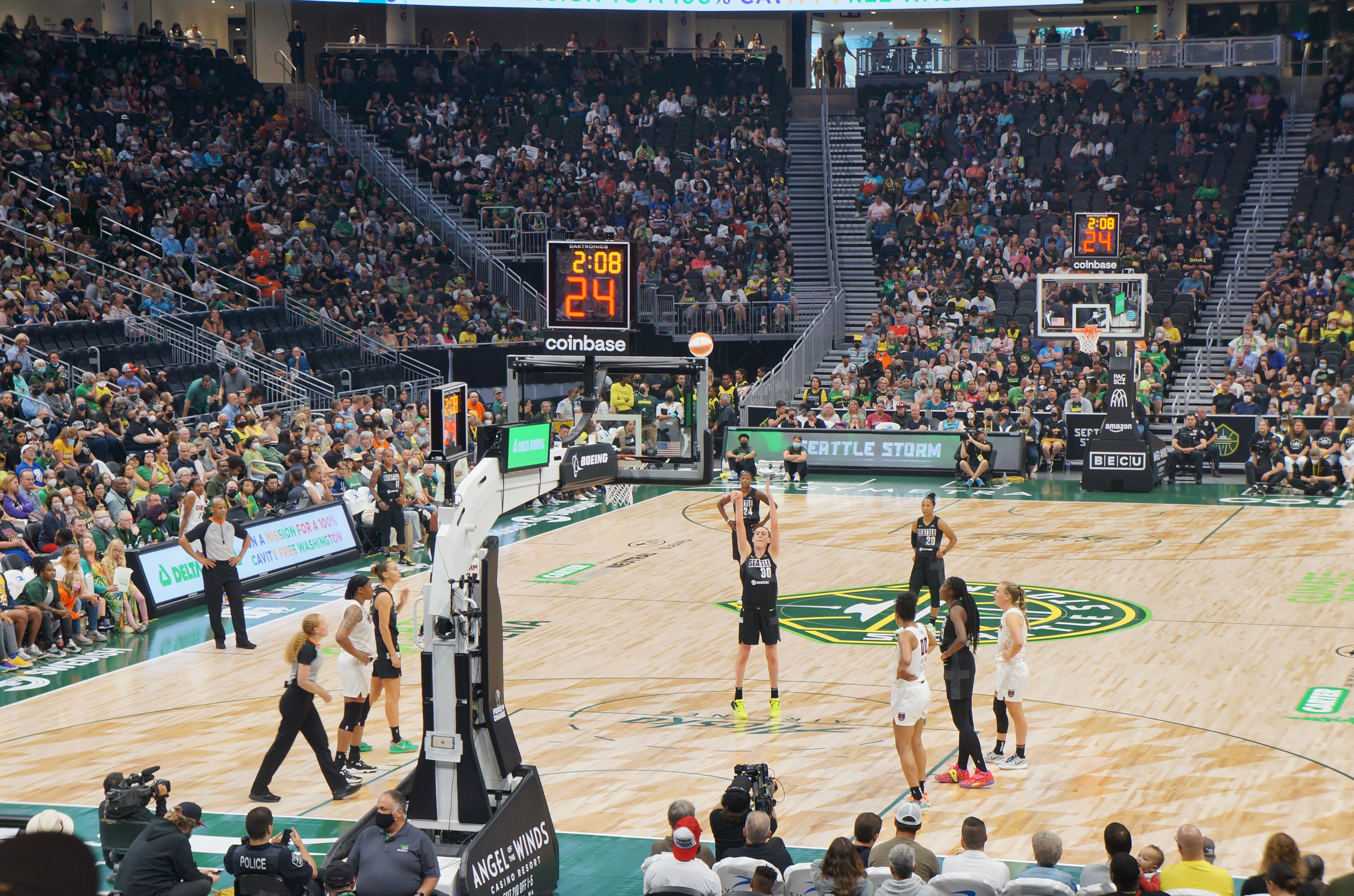
A regular season game during the 2022 WNBA season between the Seattle Storm and Atlanta Dream in Seattle, Washington

The Women's National Basketball Association (WNBA) is a professional women's basketball league in the United States with 15 teams as of 2026. The league was founded in 1996 by the men's National Basketball Association (NBA) as a wholly owned subsidiary and began play in the 1997 season with eight teams. WNBA shares the same court dimensions, hoop height, and shot clock length as the NBA, but has had shorter quarters of ten minutes each since 2006 and uses a smaller ball to match with international FIBA standards. Full NBA ownership of the league ended in 2002 and new independent ownership groups began investing in franchises; the WNBA has seven teams with independent ownership and eight that are under the same ownership as an NBA team and share the same home arena.

The league's 15 teams are organized into the Eastern and Western conferences. The number of WNBA teams has varied since the league's original eight in 1997 due to expansions and later contractions; the first expansion teams were added in 1998 and were followed by two more rounds of additions that brought the total to 16 teams in 2000. Following the change in NBA ownership in 2002, the WNBA lost two teams. The league lost two more teams by 2006 but expanded to remain at 13 teams. The number of teams has remained at 12 between the folding of the Houston Comets in 2008 and the debut of the Golden State Valkyries in 2025, which began several years of growth for the league. Two more expansion teams began play in 2026, including the league's first in Canada, and is set to be followed by three more expansions by 2030 to bring the league to 18 teams.

As of the 30th season in 2026, each team plays 44 games during the regular season, which runs from May to September. The regular season includes a month-long break for the Summer Olympic Games and a half-month break for the FIBA Women's Basketball World Cup in years with those respective tournaments. A separate break is also included for the annual WNBA All-Star Game in July. The summer schedule is mostly played during the NBA offseason, which allows teams to share venues; during the WNBA offseason, many players transfer to overseas leagues that follow a fall and winter schedule. Some regular season games in June are played against teams in the same conference to determine qualification for the WNBA Commissioner's Cup, an in-season tournament first played in 2021; the final is hosted by the team with the better win–loss record in qualifying games.

The eight teams with the best regular season records, regardless of conference, qualify for the WNBA playoffs to determine the league's champion in the WNBA Finals. As of 2025, the playoffs use a best-of-three series in the first round, where teams are seeded based on regular season performance; a best-of-five format for the semifinals; and a best-of-seven format for the WNBA Finals. The most successful playoff teams are the Minnesota Lynx, Seattle Storm, and defunct Houston Comets, who have each won four WNBA championships; the Lynx have made seven appearances in the WNBA Finals, the most in league history. Three WNBA teams had yet to win a championship by 2024; among them, the Connecticut Sun has finished as runners-up in four WNBA Finals.

The best regular season performance in league history was set in the 1998 season by the Houston Comets, who finished with a 27–3 win–loss record—a winning percentage of 0.900. The number of games played by WNBA teams has steadily increased since the initial 28-game schedule in the inaugural season; for most of the league's history, teams played 34 games before the schedule was expanded to 36 games in 2022, 40 games in 2023, and 44 games in 2025. The Las Vegas Aces won 34 games during the expanded 2023 season and set a record for most wins in a WNBA season. The WNBA playoffs has also changed its format several times; until 2016, the two conferences were separated until the WNBA Finals. Under the cross-conference format, top-seeded teams received single or double byes and some rounds had single-elimination games instead of a best-of-five series. The format was simplified in 2022 to remove single-elimination rounds and byes.

== Seasons ==
WNBA seasons
Season	Teams	Playoffs			Regular season			Commissioner's Cup winner	Ref.
Season	Teams	Champion	Series	Runners-up	Top seed	Record	Games	Commissioner's Cup winner	Ref.
1997	8	Houston Comets	1–0	New York Liberty	Houston Comets	18–10	28	Not established until 2020	
1998	10	Houston Comets (2nd title)	2–1	Phoenix Mercury	Houston Comets	27–3	30	Not established until 2020	
1999	12	Houston Comets (3rd title)	2–1	New York Liberty	Houston Comets	26–6	32	Not established until 2020	
2000	16	Houston Comets (4th title)	2–0	New York Liberty	Los Angeles Sparks	28–4	32	Not established until 2020	
2001	16	Los Angeles Sparks	2–0	Charlotte Sting	Los Angeles Sparks	28–4	32	Not established until 2020	
2002	16	Los Angeles Sparks (2nd title)	2–1	New York Liberty	Los Angeles Sparks	25–7	32	Not established until 2020	
2003	14	Detroit Shock	2–1	Los Angeles Sparks	Detroit Shock	25–9	34	Not established until 2020	
2004	13	Seattle Storm	2–1	Connecticut Sun	Los Angeles Sparks	25–9	34	Not established until 2020	
2005	13	Sacramento Monarchs	3–1	Connecticut Sun	Connecticut Sun	26–8	34	Not established until 2020	
2006	14	Detroit Shock (2nd title)	3–2	Sacramento Monarchs	Connecticut Sun	26–8	34	Not established until 2020	
2007	13	Phoenix Mercury	3–2	Detroit Shock	Detroit Shock	24–10	34	Not established until 2020	
2008	14	Detroit Shock (3rd title)	3–0	San Antonio Silver Stars	San Antonio Silver Stars	24–10	34	Not established until 2020	
2009	13	Phoenix Mercury (2nd title)	3–2	Indiana Fever	Phoenix Mercury	23–11	34	Not established until 2020	
2010	12	Seattle Storm (2nd title)	3–0	Atlanta Dream	Seattle Storm	28–6	34	Not established until 2020	
2011	12	Minnesota Lynx	3–0	Atlanta Dream	Minnesota Lynx	27–7	34	Not established until 2020	
2012	12	Indiana Fever	3–1	Minnesota Lynx	Minnesota Lynx	27–7	34	Not established until 2020	
2013	12	Minnesota Lynx (2nd title)	3–0	Atlanta Dream	Minnesota Lynx	26–8	34	Not established until 2020	
2014	12	Phoenix Mercury (3rd title)	3–0	Chicago Sky	Phoenix Mercury	29–5	34	Not established until 2020	
2015	12	Minnesota Lynx (3rd title)	3–2	Indiana Fever	New York Liberty	23–11	34	Not established until 2020	
2016	12	Los Angeles Sparks (3rd title)	3–2	Minnesota Lynx	Minnesota Lynx	28–6	34	Not established until 2020	
2017	12	Minnesota Lynx (4th title)	3–2	Los Angeles Sparks	Minnesota Lynx	27–7	34	Not established until 2020	
2018	12	Seattle Storm (3rd title)	3–0	Washington Mystics	Seattle Storm	26–8	34	Not established until 2020	
2019	12	Washington Mystics	3–2	Connecticut Sun	Washington Mystics	26–8	34	Not established until 2020	
2020	12	Seattle Storm (4th title)	3–0	Las Vegas Aces	Las Vegas Aces (Note: The Las Vegas Aces and Seattle Storm finished with identical 18–4 records during the 2020 regular season; Las Vegas earned the top seed by winning the head-to-head tiebreaker.)	18–4	22 (Note: Due to the COVID-19 pandemic, the 2020 season was shortened to 22 games and played entirely behind closed doors at an isolated site in Bradenton, Florida.)	Not held (Note: The first edition of the WNBA Commissioner's Cup was delayed to 2021 due to the COVID-19 pandemic.)	
2021	12	Chicago Sky	3–1	Phoenix Mercury	Connecticut Sun	26–6	32	Seattle Storm	
2022	12	Las Vegas Aces	3–1	Connecticut Sun	Las Vegas Aces (Note: The Las Vegas Aces and Chicago Sky finished with identical 26–10 records during the 2022 regular season; Las Vegas earned the top seed by winning the head-to-head tiebreaker 2–1.)	26–10	36	Las Vegas Aces	
2023	12	Las Vegas Aces (2nd title)	3–1	New York Liberty	Las Vegas Aces	34–6	40	New York Liberty	
2024	12	New York Liberty	3–2	Minnesota Lynx	New York Liberty	32–8	40	Minnesota Lynx	
2025	13	Las Vegas Aces (3rd title)	4–0	Phoenix Mercury	Minnesota Lynx	34–10	44	Indiana Fever	
2026	15	Golden State Valkyries (1st title)	4–3	Atlanta Dream	Minnesota Lynx	33–11	44	New York Liberty	
