= Kelly Boucher =

Canadian former basketball player

Kelly Boucher (born 13 January 1968 in Calgary, Alberta) is a Canadian former basketball player who competed in the 1996 Summer Olympics and in the 2000 Summer Olympics. She also played for the Charlotte Sting of the Women's National Basketball Association (WNBA). During the 1998 WNBA season, Boucher became the first Canadian to play in the league.

== Career statistics ==
Legend
GP	Games played	GS	Games started	MPG	Minutes per game	RPG	Rebounds per game
APG	Assists per game	SPG	Steals per game	BPG	Blocks per game	PPG	Points per game
TO	Turnovers per game	FG%	Field-goal percentage	3P%	3-point field-goal percentage	FT%	Free-throw percentage
**Bold**	Career best	°	League leader

=== WNBA ===
Year	Team	GP	GS	MPG	FG%	3P%	FT%	RPG	APG	SPG	BPG	TO	PPG
1998	Charlotte	9	0	5.8	.200	.167	.750	1.4	.2	.1	.0	.3	1.1

== Awards and honors ==
- Top 100 U Sports women's basketball Players of the Century (1920–2020).
