= Cass Bauer-Bilodeau =

American basketball player (born 1972)

Personal information
- Born: June 27, 1972 (age 54) Hysham, Montana, U.S.

Career information
- College: Montana State

Career highlights
- Big Sky Player of the Year (1993); 3× All-Big Sky (1992–1994)
- Stats at Basketball Reference

Cassandra Sue Bauer-Bilodeau (née Bauer; born June 27, 1972) is an American former professional basketball player in the American Basketball League (ABL) and Women's National Basketball Association (WNBA). She played college basketball for the Montana State Bobcats.

== Basketball career ==
A native of Hysham, Montana, she graduated in 1994 from Montana State University, where she played for the Bobcats, and earned a degree in nursing. She led the Bobcats to their first championship in the Big Sky Conference.

She began her professional career in 1996 with the Columbus Quest in the now-defunct ABL. She became the ABL's all-time free throw percentage leader, making 147 out of 168 free throws for an average of 87 percent.

After the ABL folded due to financial difficulties, she joined the WNBA from 1999 to 2002, playing for the Charlotte Sting, the Washington Mystics, and the Sacramento Monarchs. Citing pain in her right knee, she announced her retirement shortly before the 2003 season.

== Career statistics ==
Legend
GP	Games played	GS	Games started	MPG	Minutes per game	RPG	Rebounds per game
APG	Assists per game	SPG	Steals per game	BPG	Blocks per game	PPG	Points per game
TO	Turnovers per game	FG%	Field-goal percentage	3P%	3-point field-goal percentage	FT%	Free-throw percentage
**Bold**	Career best	°	League leader

=== WNBA ===
==== Regular season ====
Year	Team	GP	GS	MPG	FG%	3P%	FT%	RPG	APG	SPG	BPG	TO	PPG
1999	Charlotte	25	0	4.9	38.2	0.0	**87.5**	0.8	0.2	0.0	0.0	0.5	1.3
2000	Charlotte	**29**	**18**	**13.7**	**40.3**	0.0	85.7	**1.9**	**0.5**	**0.3**	0.1	1.0	**2.6**
2001	Washington	15	0	6.8	29.4	0.0	50.0	1.2	0.2	0.1	0.1	**0.4**	1.0
2002	Sacramento	25	2	9.3	29.8	0.0	60.0	1.6	0.0	0.1	**0.2**	1.0	1.7
Career	4 years, 3 teams	94	20	9.1	35.6	0.0	72.2	1.4	0.2	0.1	0.1	0.8	1.8

=== College ===
Year	Team	GP	GS	MPG	FG%	3P%	FT%	RPG	APG	SPG	BPG	TO	PPG
1990–91	Montana State	24	-	-	52.9	0.0	81.6	3.3	0.4	0.1	0.1	-	4.3
1991–92	Montana State	24	-	-	44.4	0.0	73.5	6.3	0.7	0.4	0.4	-	10.3
1992–93	Montana State	**29**	-	-	**50.9**	**50.0**	**84.2**	8.6	0.6	0.6	0.4	-	18.1
1993–94	Montana State	26	-	-	43.8	26.3	80.3	**10.0**	**0.9**	**1.0**	**1.2**	-	**20.9**
**Career**		103	-	-	46.9	27.3	80.4	7.2	0.6	0.6	0.5	-	13.8
Statistics retrieved from Sports-Reference.

== Personal life ==
In 2000, she married her longtime boyfriend, Brent Bilodeau, an American/Canadian professional ice hockey player who was playing in the East Coast Hockey League. Her son, Tyler Bilodeau, plays for the UCLA Bruins.

She subsequently moved with her family to Las Vegas, Nevada, and worked as a critical care and emergency department registered nurse.
