= Tracy Reid =

American basketball player and coach (born 1976)

Personal information
- Born: November 1, 1976 (age 50)

Career information
- College: UNC (1994–1998)
- WNBA draft: 1998: 1st round, 7th overall pick
- Drafted by: Charlotte Sting
- Position: Guard/Forward

Career history
- Charlotte Sting: 1998–2000
- Miami Sol: 2001
- Phoenix Mercury: 2002–2003

Career highlights
- WNBA Rookie of the Year (1998); First-team All-American – AP (1998); Second-team All-American – AP (1997); 2× All-American – USBWA (1997, 1998); 2× Kodak All-American (1997, 1998); ACC Tournament MVP (1998); 2× ACC Player of the Year (1997, 1998); 3× First-team All-ACC (1996–1998); ACC All-Freshman Team (1995)
- Stats at Basketball Reference

Tracy LaShawn Reid (born November 1, 1976) is a former professional WNBA basketball player.

Reid attended college at University of North Carolina and graduated in 1998. Selected by the Charlotte Sting in the first round (7th overall) of the 1998 WNBA draft, Reid went on to capture the 1998 WNBA Rookie of the Year.

After three seasons with the Sting, Reid was dealt to the Miami Sol. She also played with the Phoenix Mercury and Houston Comets.

Reid is the daughter of musician and songwriter Clarence Reid (a.k.a. Blowfly).

== Career statistics ==
Legend
| GP | Games played | GS | Games started | MPG | Minutes per game | RPG | Rebounds per game |
| APG | Assists per game | SPG | Steals per game | BPG | Blocks per game | PPG | Points per game |
| TO | Turnovers per game | FG% | Field-goal percentage | 3P% | 3-point field-goal percentage | FT% | Free-throw percentage |
| **Bold** | Career best | ° | League leader |

=== WNBA ===
==== Regular season ====
| Year | Team | GP | GS | MPG | FG% | 3P% | FT% | RPG | APG | SPG | BPG | TO | PPG |
|---|---|---|---|---|---|---|---|---|---|---|---|---|---|
| 1998 | Charlotte | **30** | **30** | **32.2** | 48.7 | 0.0 | 61.3 | **5.2** | **1.5** | **1.3** | **0.4** | 2.4 | **13.8** |
| 1999 | Charlotte | 10 | 3 | 15.4 | 42.9 | 0.0 | 42.9 | 2.3 | 0.9 | 0.1 | 0.2 | 1.7 | 4.8 |
| 2000 | Charlotte | 29 | 17 | 21.4 | 47.8 | 0.0 | 54.2 | 3.4 | 1.0 | 0.5 | 0.3 | 1.8 | 7.3 |
| 2001 | Miami | 21 | 2 | 13.2 | **50.8** | 0.0 | **61.5** | 1.8 | 0.6 | 0.7 | 0.2 | 1.2 | 3.8 |
| 2002 | Mercury | 24 | 12 | 17.5 | 41.0 | 0.0 | 60.7 | 3.2 | 0.6 | 0.9 | 0.1 | 1.5 | 4.7 |
| 2003 | Mercury | 2 | 0 | 6.0 | 33.3 | 0.0 | 0.0 | 0.5 | 0.5 | 1.0 | 0.0 | **0.5** | 1.0 |
| Career | 6 years, 3 teams | 116 | 64 | 21.1 | 47.0 | 0.0 | 58.9 | 3.4 | 1.0 | 0.8 | 0.3 | 1.7 | 7.5 |

==== Regular season ====
| Year | Team | GP | GS | MPG | FG% | 3P% | FT% | RPG | APG | SPG | BPG | TO | PPG |
|---|---|---|---|---|---|---|---|---|---|---|---|---|---|
| 1998 | Charlotte | 2 | **2** | **37.0** | **56.0** | 0.0 | **36.4** | **5.0** | 0.0 | **1.0** | **0.5** | 2.5 | **16.0** |
| 1999 | Charlotte | **3** | 0 | 2.3 | 50.0 | 0.0 | 0.0 | 0.3 | 0.0 | 0.3 | 0.0 | **0.3** | 0.7 |
| 2001 | Miami | **3** | 0 | 7.0 | 40.0 | 0.0 | 0.0 | 1.7 | **0.3** | 0.3 | 0.0 | 0.7 | 1.3 |
| Career | 3 years, 2 teams | 8 | 2 | 12.8 | 53.1 | 0.0 | 26.7 | 2.0 | 0.1 | 0.5 | 0.1 | 1.0 | 4.8 |

=== College ===
Legend
| GP | Games played | GS | Games started | MPG | Minutes per game |
| FG% | Field goal percentage | 3P% | 3-point field goal percentage | FT% | Free throw percentage |
| RPG | Rebounds per game | APG | Assists per game | SPG | Steals per game |
| BPG | Blocks per game | PPG | Points per game | **Bold** | Career high |

| Year | Team | GP | Points | FG% | 3P% | FT% | RPG | APG | SPG | BPG | PPG |
|---|---|---|---|---|---|---|---|---|---|---|---|
| 94–95 | University of North Carolina | **35** | 451 | 49.3% | 22.2% | 60.3% | 7.0 | 1.1 | 1.6 | 0.3 | 12.9 |
| 95–96 | University of North Carolina | 23 | 439 | **54.5%** | 33.3% | **62.2%** | 8.9 | **1.3** | 2.2 | 0.1 | 19.1° |
| 96–97 | University of North Carolina | 30 | 623 | 53.0% | **40.0%** | 60.8% | **10.1** | 1.0 | **2.3** | 0.6 | 20.8° |
| 97–98 | University of North Carolina | 33 | **687** | 53.8% | 33.3% | 60.8% | 9.5 | 1.0 | 2.2 | **0.7** | **20.8**° |
