= 1997 Charlotte Sting season =

- Head coach: Marynell Meadors
- Arena: Charlotte Coliseum

Results
- Record: 15–13 (.536)
- Place: 3rd (Eastern)
- Playoff finish: Lost WNBA Semifinals (1-0) to Houston Comets

The 1997 WNBA season was the inaugural season for the Charlotte Sting.

== Transactions ==
=== WNBA allocation draft ===
Player	Nationality	School/Team/Country
Andrea Stinson	United States	NC State
Vicky Bullett	United States	Maryland

=== WNBA elite draft ===
Round	Pick	Player	Nationality	School/Team/Country
1	3	Rhonda Mapp	United States	NC State
2	11	Michi Atkins	United States	Texas Tech

=== WNBA draft ===
Round	Pick	Player	Nationality	School/Team/Country
1	7	Tora Suber	United States	Virginia
2	10	Sharon Manning	United States	NC State
3	23	Debra Williams	United States	Louisiana Tech
4	26	Andrea Congreaves	United Kingdom	Mercer

=== Transactions ===
Date	Transaction
1997	Hired Marynell Meadors as Head Coach
January 22, 1997	Drafted Andrea Stinson and Vicky Bullett in the 1997 WNBA Allocation Draft
February 27, 1997	Drafted Rhonda Mapp and Michi Atkins in the 1997 WNBA Elite Draft
April 28, 1997	Drafted Tora Suber, Sharon Manning, Debra Williams and Andrea Congreaves in the 1997 WNBA draft

== Roster ==
1997 Charlotte Sting roster
Players
Coaches

Pos.	No.	Nat.	Name	Height	Weight	DOB	From	Yrs
F	14	(United States)	Artis, Katasha	6' 1" (1.85m)	155 lb (70kg)	1973-07-08	Northeastern	R
F	23	(United States)	Bullett, Vicky	6' 3" (1.91m)	185 lb (84kg)	1967-10-04	Maryland	R
F/C	3	(United Kingdom)	Congreaves, Andrea	6' 2" (1.88m)	183 lb (83kg)	1970-06-03	Mercer	R
F	43	(United States)	Hopson-Shelton, Susie	6' 2" (1.88m)	175 lb (79kg)	1974-06-21	Mars Hill	R
G	11	(United States)	Levesque, Nicole	5' 3" (1.6m)	115 lb (52kg)	1972-04-11	Wake Forest	R
F/C	50	(United States)	Manning, Sharon	6' 3" (1.91m)	186 lb (84kg)	1969-03-20	NC State	R
C	51	(United States)	Mapp, Rhonda	6' 2" (1.88m)	190 lb (86kg)	1969-10-13	NC State	R
F	24	(United States)	Moore, Penny	6' 0" (1.83m)	135 lb (61kg)	1969-01-25	Long Beach State	R
G	32	(United States)	Stinson, Andrea	5' 10" (1.78m)	158 lb (72kg)	1967-11-25	NC State	R
G	7	(United States)	Suber, Tora	5' 7" (1.7m)	137 lb (62kg)	1974-11-23	Virginia	R
G/F	5	(Socialist Federal Republic of Yugoslavia)	Vukadinovic, Milica	6' 1" (1.85m)	150 lb (68kg)	1968-10-18	California	R
G/F	25	(United States)	Williams, Debra	5' 11" (1.8m)		1972-09-23	Louisiana Tech	R

Head coach
(United States) Marynell Meadors (Middle Tennessee)
Assistant coaches
(United States) Leonard Armato
(United States) Karen Freeman

Legend

- (C) Team captain
- (DP) Unsigned draft pick
- (FA) Free agent
- (S) Suspended
- Injured

== Schedule ==
=== Regular season ===
1997 game log
Total: 15–13 (Home: 12–2; Road: 3–11)
June: 1–3 (Home: 1–0; Road: 0–3)

Game	Date	Team	Score	High points	High rebounds	High assists	Location Attendance	Record
1	June 22	@ Phoenix	L 59–76	Andrea Stinson (18)	Andrea Stinson (9)	Andrea Stinson (7)	America West Arena	0–1
2	June 25	@ Los Angeles	L 54–74	Tora Suber (13)	Vicky Bullett (11)	Vicky Bullett (3)	Great Western Forum	0–2
3	June 26	@ Sacramento	L 70–78	Andrea Stinson (17)	Andrea Stinson (5)	Andrea Stinson (5)	ARCO Arena	0–3
4	June 29	Cleveland	W 67–44	Andrea Stinson (19)	Bullett; Moore; Suber (6)	Andrea Stinson (10)	Charlotte Coliseum	1–3

July : 7–4 (Home: 6–1; Road: 1–3)

Game	Date	Team	Score	High points	High rebounds	High assists	Location Attendance	Record
5	July 5	Los Angeles	W 78–66	Andrea Stinson (19)	Manning; Moore (5)	Tora Suber (9)	Charlotte Coliseum	2–3
6	July 7	@ Houston	L 56–74	Andrea Stinson (13)	Vicky Bullett (10)	Suber; Levesque (3)	The Summit	2–4
7	July 9	New York	W 87–69	Andrea Stinson (29)	Andrea Stinson (9)	Andrea Stinson (6)	Charlotte Coliseum	3–4
8	July 10	@ New York	L 48–62	Andrea Stinson (20)	Sharon Manning (7)	Tora Suber (3)	Madison Square Garden	3–5
9	July 12	Cleveland	W 72–43	Rhonda Mapp (14)	Andrea Congreaves (9)	Nicole Levesque (5)	Charlotte Coliseum	4–5
10	July 16	Utah	W 75–63	Andrea Stinson (19)	Andrea Stinson (10)	Penny Moore (6)	Charlotte Coliseum	5–5
11	July 17	@ Cleveland	L 47–65	Vicky Bullett (24)	Vicky Bullett (5)	Andrea Stinson (4)	Gund Arena	5–6
12	July 21	Los Angeles	W 75–64	Andrea Stinson (23)	Rhonda Mapp (11)	Andrea Stinson (8)	Charlotte Coliseum	6–6
13	July 23	New York	L 63–65	Rhonda Mapp (17)	Vicky Bullett (11)	Bullett; Levesque; Mapp; Stinson (3)	Charlotte Coliseum	6–7
14	July 26	@ New York	W 64–61	Rhonda Mapp (15)	Bullett; Mapp; Stinson (8)	Nicole Levesque (5)	Madison Square Garden	7–7
15	July 30	Phoenix	W 68–67	Vicky Bullett (20)	Andrea Congreaves (16)	Nicole Levesque (5)	Charlotte Coliseum	8–7

August : 7–6 (Home: 5–1; Road: 2–5)

Game	Date	Team	Score	High points	High rebounds	High assists	Location Attendance	Record
16	August 1	Sacramento	W 85–61	Rhonda Mapp (20)	Manning; Mapp (8)	Andrea Stinson (7)	Charlotte Coliseum	9–7
17	August 3	@ Los Angeles	W 77–70	Rhonda Mapp (21)	Andrea Stinson (7)	Andrea Stinson (7)	Great Western Forum	10–7
18	August 4	@ Utah	L 70–73	Andrea Stinson (15)	Vicky Bullett (13)	Mapp; Stinson (4)	Delta Center	10–8
19	August 6	@ Sacramento	L 64–77	Vicky Bullett (19)	Vicky Bullett (9)	Andrea Stinson (5)	ARCO Arena	10–9
20	August 9	Phoenix	W 79–59	Andrea Stinson (25)	Andrea Congreaves (11)	Andrea Congreaves (7)	Charlotte Coliseum	11–9
21	August 11	Houston	L 62–72	Andrea Stinson (17)	Congreaves; Stinson (5)	Andrea Stinson (6)	Charlotte Coliseum	11–10
22	August 14	Sacramento	W 68–51	Andrea Stinson (16)	Bullett; Mapp (9)	Rhonda Mapp (5)	Charlotte Coliseum	12–10
23	August 16	Houston	W 80–71	Andrea Stinson (25)	Vicky Bullett (11)	Nicky Levesque (8)	Charlotte Coliseum	13–10
24	August 17	@ Cleveland	L 49–81	Rhonda Mapp (12)	Rhonda Mapp (8)	Tora Suber (4)	Gund Arena	13–11
25	August 19	@ Houston	L 49–81	Vicky Bullett (24)	Rhonda Mapp (7)	Andrea Stinson (7)	The Summit	13–12
26	August 21	@ Utah	W 66–56	Bullett; Stinson (14)	Rhonda Mapp (9)	Levesque; Mapp (4)	Delta Center	14–12
27	August 22	@ Phoenix	L 63–78	Andrea Congreaves (13)	Andrea Stinson (6)	Andrea Stinson (7)	America West Arena	14–13
28	August 24	Utah	W 70–52	Andrea Stinson (17)	Vicky Bullett (11)	Nicole Levesque (8)	Charlotte Coliseum	15–13

1997 season schedule

=== Playoffs ===
1997 playoff game log
Semifinal vs. Houston Comets

Game	Date	Team	Score	High points	High rebounds	High assists	Location Attendance	Record
1	August 28	@ Houston	L 54–70	Rhonda Mapp (12)	Vicky Bullett (9)	Levesque; Mapp; Stinson (3)	The Summit	0–1

1997 playoff schedule

=== Season standings ===
Eastern Conference	W	L	PCT	Conf.	GB
Houston Comets ^{x}	18	10	.643	6–6	–
New York Liberty ^{x}	17	11	.607	8–4	1.0
Charlotte Sting ^{x}	15	13	.536	5–7	3.0
Cleveland Rockers ^{o}	15	13	.536	5–7	3.0

== Statistics ==
Legend
GP	Games played	GS	Games started	MPG	Minutes per game	RPG	Rebounds per game
APG	Assists per game	SPG	Steals per game	BPG	Blocks per game	PPG	Points per game
FG%	Field-goal percentage	3P%	3-point field-goal percentage	FT%	Free-throw percentage	TO	Turnovers per game
PF	Fouls per game		Team leader		League leader

=== Regular season ===
Player	GP	GS	MPG	FG%	3P%	FT%	RPG	APG	SPG	BPG	PPG
Andrea Stinson	28	28	36.1	.447	.325	.674	5.5	4.4	1.5	0.8	15.7
Vicky Bullett	28	28	31.3	.448	.304	.775	6.4	2.3	1.9	2.0	12.8
Rhonda Mapp	28	23	25.4	.492	.500	.774	5.5	2.3	0.8	0.4	11.6
Andrea Congreaves	28	16	23.5	.500	.409	.768	4.8	1.5	0.6	0.2	6.7
Nicole Levesque	27	21	23.0	.367	.348	.933	1.7	2.8	0.8	0.1	4.0
Penny Moore	28	9	19.3	.358	.200	.516	2.6	1.0	0.6	0.4	4.8
Tora Suber	28	8	17.0	.370	.397	.683	1.5	2.0	0.5	0.1	4.7
Sharon Manning	28	5	15.6	.464	N/A	.420	3.5	0.5	0.9	0.2	4.9
Milica Vukadinovic	1	0	14.0	1.000	1.000	N/A	1.0	1.0	1.0	0.0	3.0
Debra Williams	10	2	11.6	.256	.222	.500	1.3	0.9	0.2	0.0	2.7
Katasha Artis	20	0	5.7	.250	.000	.533	0.8	0.4	0.3	0.1	0.8
Susie Hopson-Shelton	6	0	4.8	.636	N/A	1.000	0.8	0.2	0.2	0.0	2.7

^{‡}Waived/Released during the season
^{†}Traded during the season
^{≠}Acquired during the season

- Vicky Bullett ranked seventh in the WNBA in field goals with 145.
- Vicky Bullett ranked eighth in the WNBA in total rebounds with 178
- Vicky Bullett was tied for sixth in the WNBA in steals with 54.
- Vicky Bullett ranked third in the WNBA in blocks with 55.
- Rhonda Mapp ranked third in the WNBA in Field Goal Percentage (.492)
- Andrea Stinson ranked sixth in the WNBA in assists with 124.
- Andrea Stinson tied for seventh in the WNBA in blocks with 21.
- Andrea Stinson ranked sixth in the WNBA in points with 439 points.
- Andrea Stinson ranked second in the WNBA in field goals with 177.
- Andrea Stinson ranked second in the WNBA in minutes per game with 36.1
- Andrea Stinson ranked fifth in the WNBA in points per game with 15.7

== Awards and honors ==
- Vicky Bullett of Charlotte ranked third in the WNBA with 2.0 blocks per game.
- Andrea Stinson of Charlotte ranked second in the WNBA with 1011 minutes played.
