= Andrea Stinson =

American basketball player (born 1967)

Personal information
- Born: November 25, 1967 (age 58) Cornelius, North Carolina, U.S.
- Listed height: 5 ft 10 in (1.78 m)
- Listed weight: 158 lb (72 kg)

Career information
- High school: North Mecklenburg (Huntersville, North Carolina)
- College: NC State (1987–1991)
- Playing career: 1997–2005
- Position: Guard
- Number: 32, 7

Career history
- 1992–1994: Tarbes Gespe Bigorre
- 1997–2004: Charlotte Sting
- 2005: Detroit Shock

Career highlights
- 3× WNBA All-Star (2000–2002); 2× All-WNBA Second Team (1997, 1998); No. 32 retired by Charlotte Sting; No. 32 retired by NC State; 2× All-American – Kodak, USBWA (1990, 1991); ACC Player of the Year (1990); 3× First-team All-ACC (1989–1991); ACC Tournament MVP (1990); North Carolina Miss Basketball (1987)

Career WNBA statistics
- Points: 3,351 (12.3 ppg)
- Rebounds: 1,127 (4.1 rpg)
- Assists: 810 (3.0 apg)
- Stats at Basketball Reference
Medals
Women's basketball
Representing United States
Jones Cup
Gold medal – first place	1992 Taipei	Team competition
Pan American Games
Bronze medal – third place	1991 Havana	Team

Andrea Stinson (born November 25, 1967) is a retired professional basketball player from the United States, playing for the WNBA from 1997 to 2004 for the Charlotte Sting and one final season in 2005 with the Detroit Shock.

== Early life ==
Stinson attended North Mecklenburg High School in Huntersville, North Carolina. Stinson was honored as the 1986–87 North Carolina High School Athletic Association (NCHSAA) Female Athlete of the Year. The Charlotte Observer named her North Carolina Miss Basketball in 1987. She played college basketball for North Carolina State University. She finished her NC State career third in scoring (2,136), third in field goals (917), third in steals (286), sixth in assists (402) and sixth in blocked shots (84).

=== NC State statistics ===
Legend
GP	Games played	GS	Games started	MPG	Minutes per game
FG%	Field goal percentage	3P%	3-point field goal percentage	FT%	Free throw percentage
RPG	Rebounds per game	APG	Assists per game	SPG	Steals per game
BPG	Blocks per game	PPG	Points per game	**Bold**	Career high

Year	Team	GP	Points	FG%	3P%	FT%	RPG	APG	SPG	BPG	PPG
1988-89	NC State	31	733	52.9%	26.5%	66.1%	4.5	3.6	3.0	0.7	**23.6**°
1989-90	NC State	30	651	**55.1%**	**39.1%**	**69.1%**	**6.6**	4.0	2.7	**1.2**	21.7°
1990-91	NC State	**33**	**752**	54.4%	36.3%	60.3%	6.3	**4.2**	**3.3**	0.8	style="background:#D3D3D3"22.8°
Total		94	2136	54.1%	33.5%	64.7%	5.8	4.3	3.0	0.9	22.7

== USA Basketball ==
Stinson played with the USA team at the 1991 Pan American Games. The team finished with a record of 4–2, but managed to win the bronze medal. The USA team lost a three-point game to Brazil, then responded with wins over Argentina and Cuba, earning a spot in the medal round. The next game was a rematch against Cuba, and this time the team from Cuba won a five-point game. The USA beat Canada easily to win the bronze. Stinson averaged 3.0 points per game.

Stinson was named to the USA team competing in the 1992 William Jones Cup competition in Taipei, Taiwan. The team won all eight games and won the gold medal. Stinson averaged 11.1 points per game, second highest on the team.

== Career highlight ==
- Three-time Italian League All-Star for Parma (1994–95), Cesena (1995–96) and Thiene (1996–97)
- Only player in the league with 400 points, 125 rebounds and 120 assists in 1997 and 1998
- Became the fourth player in league history to score 2,000 career points in 2001
- Named to the Eastern Conference All-Star Team in 2001

== Overseas career ==
- 1992–1994: (France) Tarbes GB
- 1994–1995: (Italy) Lavezzini Parma
- 1995–1996: (Italy) Ahena Cesena
- 1996–1997: (Italy) Thiene
- 1998–2001: (Turkey) Galatasaray
- 2001–2002: (Turkey) Botassport Adana

== WNBA ==
On January 22, 1997, Stinson was selected by the Sting as part of the initial player allocation of the WNBA's inaugural season. Her debut game was played on June 22, 1997 in a 59 – 76 loss to the Phoenix Mercury where she recorded 18 points, 9 rebounds, 7 assists and 3 steals. During her rookie season, Stinson was a consistent starter for her team, producing an average of 15.7 points, 5.5 rebounds and 4.4 assists in 36.1 minutes per game. Stinson finished 2nd in the league in total minutes played and minutes per game for the 1997 season (being behind Chantel Tremitiere in both categories). The Sting finished 15 – 13 and reached the playoffs but were eliminated by the eventual champions Houston Comets.

Stinson would spend her career becoming a flagship notable player for the Sting franchise. After her rookie season, she stayed with the team for 7 additional seasons and made the All-Star team 3 times from 2000 to 2002. Her best individual season came in 2000 when she averaged 17.7 points, 4.3 rebounds and 3.8 assists. Unfortunately, that would be the first of two times that Stinson did not reach the playoffs with the Sting, as the team finished with a 8 – 24 record. The best season for the Sting would happen immediately after. As for 2001, although Stinson recorded less minutes played and averaged less points, less assists and less steals per game, the team finished 18 – 14 and reached the WNBA finals. After crushing the Cleveland Rockers and New York Liberty in the first two rounds, Stinson and the Sting would match up against the Los Angeles Sparks in the 2001 Finals and be swept by the defending champions.

For the 2002 and 2003 seasons, the Sting would finish the season with a 18 – 14 and 18 – 16 record respectively and reach the playoffs, but both times were eliminated in the semi-finals (by the Washington Mystics in 2002 and by the Connecticut Sun in 2003). The 2004 season is when Stinson's numbers took a big decline. Although she still started every game that season, she played in less minutes than she has previously (only 22.9 per game) and had career-low averages in other statistics. With points per game dropping to 6.0, rebounds dropping to 3.5 and assists lowering to 1.4 per game.

After the Sting missed the playoffs in 2004, Stinson would say goodbye as a player for the organization. On May 10, 2005, she signed with the Detroit Shock and played 18 games for them before being traded to the Phoenix Mercury on June 29, 2005 along with a 2006 second-round pick (which later became Mistie Bass) for Plenette Pierson. Stinson was immediately waived by the Mercury that same day but she resigned with the Shock 4 days later on July 3 and finished the season with them. By this point, Stinson has never came off the bench in her career, as she started in all 254 games she played for the Sting from 1997 – 2004. With the Shock, Stinson played 5.7 minutes per game and only had a starting role on the last game of the season on August 27, 2005. This game ended up being Stinson's final game of her career as although the Shock were able to reach the playoffs, she did not participate in the semi-finals series against the Sun. In her final WNBA game, the Shock loss 67 – 76 to the Mystics while she recorded 7 points and 5 rebounds.

== Coaching career ==
- 2019 Head Coach at Walter Williams High School
- 2013–2018 Head Coach at Newton-Conover High School

== Sports diplomacy ==
Stinson has also been an active participant in the SportsUnited Sports Envoy program for the U.S. Department of State. In this function, she has traveled to Algeria, Bahrain, and Jordan where she worked with Shameka Christon, Martin Conlon, Sam Perkins, Sam Vincent, and Jerome Williams to conduct basketball clinics and events that reached more than 400 youth from underserved areas. In so doing, Stinson helped contribute to SportsUnited's mission to foster greater understanding between people and cultures.

== WNBA career statistics ==
Legend
GP	Games played	GS	Games started	MPG	Minutes per game	RPG	Rebounds per game
APG	Assists per game	SPG	Steals per game	BPG	Blocks per game	PPG	Points per game
TO	Turnovers per game	FG%	Field-goal percentage	3P%	3-point field-goal percentage	FT%	Free-throw percentage
**Bold**	Career best	°	League leader

=== Regular season ===
Year	Team	GP	GS	MPG	FG%	3P%	FT%	RPG	APG	SPG	BPG	TO	PPG
1997	Charlotte	28	28	**36.1**	.447	.325	.674	**5.5**	4.4	1.5	**0.8**	3.5	15.7
1998	Charlotte	30	30	34.9	.418	.282	.750	4.6	**4.5**	1.8	0.5	2.6	15.0
1999	Charlotte	32	32	32.5	.460	.309	.739	3.5	2.9	1.0	0.6	2.1	13.6
2000	Charlotte	32	32	35.1	.462	.358	.739	4.3	3.8	**1.7**	0.7	2.7	**17.7**
2001	Charlotte	32	32	31.4	**.484**	**.446**	**.797**	4.3	2.8	1.3	0.6	2.2	14.1
2002	Charlotte	32	32	29.7	.456	.414	.688	**5.5**	2.8	1.2	0.3	1.6	12.8
2003	Charlotte	**34**	**34**	29.4	.458	.307	.759	4.1	2.9	1.4	0.2	2.2	11.1
2004	Charlotte	**34**	**34**	22.9	.414	.297	.773	3.5	1.4	0.8	0.2	1.2	6.0
2005	Detroit	18	1	5.7	.348	.200	.667	0.7	0.7	0.2	0.0	**0.2**	1.2
Career	9 years, 2 teams	272	255	29.6	.451	.339	.736	4.1	3.0	1.3	0.4	2.1	12.3

=== Playoffs ===
Year	Team	GP	GS	MPG	FG%	3P%	FT%	RPG	APG	SPG	BPG	TO	PPG
1997	Charlotte	1	1	34.0	.273	.000	**1.000**	0.0	3.0	0.0	0.0	3.0	8.0
1998	Charlotte	2	2	35.5	.444	.286	.600	5.0	**6.5**	2.0	0.0	3.0	14.5
1999	Charlotte	4	4	**38.3**	**.500**	.286	.789	**7.5**	4.3	**2.8**	**0.3**	**1.3**	**20.8**
2001	Charlotte	**8**	**8**	34.8	.389	.385	.810	6.1	3.3	1.6	0.3	2.3	12.0
2002	Charlotte	2	2	32.5	.480	**.571**	**1.000**	5.5	4.5	3.5	0.0	2.0	15.0
2003	Charlotte	2	2	32.0	.429	.429	**1.000**	4.5	3.5	1.0	0.0	2.0	18.0
Career	6 years, 1 team	19	19	35.0	.432	.360	.828	4.1	3.0	1.3	0.4	2.1	12.3
