= Dan Hughes (basketball) =

American basketball coach

Personal information
- Born: April 14, 1955 (age 71) Lowell, Ohio, U.S.

Career information
- College: Muskingum (1972–1974)
- Coaching career: 2000–2021

Career history
- 1977–78: Miami (OH) (men's) (grad assistant)
- 1978–79: Madison-Plains High School (boys)
- 1982–84: Mount Union College (men's) (assistant)
- 1984–85: Baldwin–Wallace (men's) (assistant)
- 1985–91: Mount Union College (men's) (assistant)
- 1991–96: Toledo (men's) (assistant)
- 1996–97: Toledo (women's) (assistant)
- 1999: Charlotte Sting (assistant)
- 1999: Charlotte Sting
- 2000–2003: Cleveland Rockers
- 2005–2009: San Antonio Stars
- 2011–2016: San Antonio Stars
- 2018–2019: Seattle Storm
- 2021: Seattle Storm
- 2018–present: United States (assistant)

Career highlights
- 2× WNBA champion (2018, 2020); 2× WNBA Coach of the Year (2001, 2007)

Daniel Dean Hughes (born April 14, 1955) is an American former basketball coach. He last coached Seattle Storm of the Women's National Basketball Association (WNBA) from 2018 until his retirement in 2021. He has guided stars such as Sue Bird, Natasha Howard, Mercedes Russell, and Jordin Canada.

Hughes coached the Silver Stars from 2005 to 2009, and rejoined the team in 2011. Prior to the 2013 season, Hughes signed a multiyear contract extension. He has coached the most victories in franchise history. On April 19, 2016, the Stars announced that Hughes would step down as general manager and head coach following the 2016 season.

Hughes was hired by the Seattle Storm in 2018 and led them to their third WNBA championship in his first season. He was unable to join the team for the 2020 season due to having a high risk of COVID-19 infection after a previous tumor removal. Hughes returned to the team for the 2021 season.

== Coaching record ==
Legend
Regular season	G	Games coached	W	Games won	L	Games lost	W–L %	Win–loss %
Playoffs	PG	Playoff games	PW	Playoff wins	PL	Playoff losses	PW–L %	Playoff win–loss %

Team	Year	G	W	L	W–L%	Finish	PG	PW	PL	PW–L%	Result
CHA	1999	20	10	10	.500	2nd in East	4	2	2	.500	Lost in Eastern Conference Finals
CLE	2000	32	17	15	.531	2nd in East	6	3	3	.500	Lost in Eastern Conference Finals
CLE	2001	32	22	10	.688	1st in East	3	1	2	.333	Lost in Eastern Conference Semi-Finals
CLE	2002	32	10	22	.313	7th in East	–	–	–	–	Missed Playoffs
CLE	2003	34	17	17	.500	4th in East	3	1	2	.333	Lost in Eastern Conference Semi-Finals
SAS	2005	34	7	27	.206	7th in West	–	–	–	–	Missed Playoffs
SAS	2006	34	13	21	.382	6th in West	–	–	–	–	Missed Playoffs
SAS	2007	34	20	14	.588	2nd in West	5	2	3	.400	Lost in Western Conference Finals
SAS	2008	34	24	10	.706	1st in West	9	4	5	.444	Lost in WNBA Finals
SAS	2009	34	15	19	.441	4th in West	3	1	2	.333	Lost in Western Conference Semi-Finals
SAS	2011	34	18	16	.529	4th in West	3	1	2	.333	Lost in Western Conference Semi-Finals
SAS	2012	34	21	13	.618	3rd in West	2	0	2	.000	Lost in Western Conference Semi-Finals
SAS	2013	34	12	22	.353	5th in West	–	–	–	–	Missed Playoffs
SAS	2014	34	16	18	.471	4th in West	2	0	2	.000	Lost in Western Conference Semi-Finals
SAS	2015	34	8	26	.235	6th in West	–	–	–	–	Missed Playoffs
SAS	2016	34	7	27	.206	6th in West	–	–	–	–	Missed Playoffs
SEA	2018	34	26	8	.765	1st in West	8	6	2	.750	Won WNBA Championship
SEA	2019	34	18	16	.529	3rd in West	2	1	1	.500	Lost in 2nd Round
SEA	2021	6	5	1	.833	(retired)	–	–	–	–	
Career		598	286	312	.478		50	22	28	.440	
