= 1998 WNBA draft =

1998 meeting of WNBA teams to select players

General information
- Sport: Basketball
- Date: April 28, 1998

Overview
- League: WNBA
- Expansion teams: Detroit Shock; Washington Mystics
- First selection: Małgorzata Dydek; Utah Starzz

1998 WNBA draft

- On January 27, 1998, a total of 4 players were assigned to two teams in no particular order.
- On February 18, 1998, a WNBA expansion draft took place.
- On April 28, 1998, the regular WNBA draft took place.
- On September 15, 1998, two more players were assigned for the expansion draft of 1999.

!	Denotes player who has been inducted to the Naismith Basketball Hall of Fame
^	Denotes player who has been inducted to the Women's Basketball Hall of Fame
^{+}	Denotes player who has been selected for at least one All-Star Game
^{#}	Denotes player who never played in the WNBA regular season or playoffs
**Bold**	Denotes player who won Rookie of the Year

== Draft ==
=== Round 1 ===
Pick	Player	Position	Nationality	Team	School / club team
1	Małgorzata Dydek ^{+}	C	Poland	Utah Starzz	Pool Getafe (Spain)
2	Ticha Penicheiro * ^	G	Portugal	Sacramento Monarchs	Old Dominion
3	Murriel Page	F/C	United States	Washington Mystics	Florida
4	Korie Hlede	G	Croatia	Detroit Shock	Duquesne
5	Allison Feaster ^{+}	F	United States	Los Angeles Sparks	Harvard
6	Cindy Blodgett	G	United States	Cleveland Rockers	Maine
7	**Tracy Reid**	F/G	United States	Charlotte Sting	North Carolina
8	Maria Stepanova	C	Russia	Phoenix Mercury	CSKA Moscow (Russia)
9	Alicia Thompson	C	United States	New York Liberty	Texas Tech
10	Polina Tzekova	F/C	Bulgaria	Houston Comets	Tarbes Gespe Bigorre (France)

=== Round 2 ===
Pick	Player	Position	Nationality	Team	School / club team
11	Olympia Scott	F/C	United States	Utah Starzz	Stanford
12	Tangela Smith ^{+}	F/C	United States	Sacramento Monarchs	Iowa
13	Rita Williams ^{+}	G	United States	Washington Mystics	Connecticut
14	Rachael Sporn	F	Australia	Detroit Shock	Adelaide Lightning (Australia)
15	Octavia Blue	F	United States	Los Angeles Sparks	Miami
16	Suzie McConnell Serio ^{x} ^	G	United States	Cleveland Rockers	Penn State
17	Christy Smith	G	United States	Charlotte Sting	Arkansas
18	Andrea Kuklová	G/F	Slovakia	Phoenix Mercury	Pays d'Aix Basket 13 (France)
19	Nadine Domond	G	United States	New York Liberty	Iowa
20	Nyree Roberts	C	United States	Houston Comets	Old Dominion

=== Round 3 ===
Pick	Player	Position	Nationality	Team	School / club team
21	LaTonya Johnson	F	United States	Utah Starzz	Memphis
22	Quacy Barnes	C	United States	Sacramento Monarchs	Indiana
23	Angela Hamblin	G/F	United States	Washington Mystics	Iowa
24	Gergana Branzova	F	Bulgaria	Detroit Shock	Florida International
25	Rehema Stephens	G	United States	Los Angeles Sparks	UCLA
26	Tanja Kostić	F	Sweden	Cleveland Rockers	Oregon State
27	Pollyanna Johns	C	United States	Charlotte Sting	Michigan
28	Brandy Reed ^{+}	F	United States	Phoenix Mercury	Southern Mississippi
29	Albena Branzova	F	Bulgaria	New York Liberty	Florida International
30	Amaya Valdemoro	F	Spain	Houston Comets	Pool Getafe (Spain)

=== Round 4 ===
Pick	Player	Position	Nationality	Team	School / club team
31	Tricia Bader	G	United States	Utah Starzz	Boise State
32	Adia Barnes	F	United States	Sacramento Monarchs	Arizona
33	Angela Jackson	C	United States	Washington Mystics	Texas
34	Sandy Brondello ^{+}	G	Australia	Detroit Shock	BTV Wuppertal (Germany)
35	Erica Kienast ^{#}	F	United States	Los Angeles Sparks	UC-Santa Barbara
36	Tammye Jenkins ^{#}	C	United States	Cleveland Rockers	Georgia
37	Sonia Chase	G	United States	Charlotte Sting	Maryland
38	Karen Wilkins ^{#}	G/F	United States	Phoenix Mercury	Howard
39	Vanessa Nygaard	F	United States	New York Liberty	Stanford
40	Monica Lamb-Powell	C	United States	Houston Comets	USC

== See also ==
- List of first overall WNBA draft picks
