= 1997 WNBA season =

- League: Women's National Basketball Association
- Sport: Basketball
- Duration: June 21 – August 30, 1997
- Games: 28
- Teams: 8
- Total attendance: 1,082,963
- TV partner(s): ESPN, NBC, Lifetime

Draft
- Top draft pick: (United States) Tina Thompson
- Picked by: Houston Comets

Regular season
- Top seed: Houston Comets
- Season MVP: (United States) Cynthia Cooper-Dyke (Houston)
- Top scorer: (United States) Cynthia Cooper-Dyke (Houston)

Playoffs
- Finals champions: Houston Comets
- Runners-up: New York Liberty
- Finals MVP: (United States) Cynthia Cooper-Dyke (Houston)

WNBA seasons
- 1998 →

The 1997 WNBA season was the Women's National Basketball Association's inaugural season. It started off with 8 franchises: Charlotte Sting, Cleveland Rockers, Houston Comets, Los Angeles Sparks, New York Liberty, Phoenix Mercury, Sacramento Monarchs, and the Utah Starzz. It featured an inaugural game between the New York Liberty and the Los Angeles Sparks. The Sparks lost to the New York Liberty, 67–57. The attendance at the Forum was 14,284. The season ended with the Comets defeating the Liberty in a one-game series 65–51. Cynthia Cooper was named MVP of the game.

== Regular season ==
=== Standings ===
Eastern Conference

Eastern Conference	W	L	PCT	Conf.	GB
Houston Comets ^{x}	18	10	.643	6–6	–
New York Liberty ^{x}	17	11	.607	8–4	1.0
Charlotte Sting ^{x}	15	13	.536	5–7	3.0
Cleveland Rockers ^{o}	15	13	.536	5–7	3.0

Western Conference

Western Conference	W	L	PCT	Conf.	GB
Phoenix Mercury ^{x}	16	12	.571	9–3	–
Los Angeles Sparks ^{o}	14	14	.500	8–4	2.0
Sacramento Monarchs ^{o}	10	18	.357	4–8	6.0
Utah Starzz ^{o}	7	21	.250	3–9	9.0

Note: Teams with an "X" clinched playoff spots.

== Playoffs ==
For the playoffs, the four teams with the best record in the league were seeded one to four. Houston was in the Eastern Conference so two Eastern Conference teams matched up in the WNBA Championship.

**Semifinals** single game
1	**Houston**	**70**
4	Charlotte	54
2	**New York**	**59**
3	Phoenix	41

**WNBA Championship** single game
1	**Houston**	**65**
2	New York	51

- **Bold** – Game winner
- Italic – Team with home-court advantage

== Awards ==
=== Individual ===
Award		Winner	Team
Most Valuable Player (MVP)		Cynthia Cooper	Houston Comets
Finals MVP		Cynthia Cooper	Houston Comets
Defensive Player of the Year		Teresa Weatherspoon	New York Liberty
Shooting Champions	**Eastern Conference**	Andrea Congreaves	Charlotte Sting
Shooting Champions	**Western Conference**	Haixia Zheng	Los Angeles Sparks
Sportsmanship Award		Haixia Zheng	Los Angeles Sparks
Coach of the Year		Van Chancellor	Houston Comets

=== Team ===
Award		Player	Team
All-WNBA	First Team	Eva Nemcova	Cleveland Rockers
All-WNBA	First Team	Tina Thompson	Houston Comets
All-WNBA	First Team	Lisa Leslie	Los Angeles Sparks
All-WNBA	First Team	Cynthia Cooper	Houston Comets
All-WNBA	First Team	Ruthie Bolton-Holifield	Sacramento Monarchs
All-WNBA	Second Team	Wendy Palmer	Utah Starzz
All-WNBA	Second Team	Rebecca Lobo	New York Liberty
All-WNBA	Second Team	Jennifer Gillom	Phoenix Mercury
All-WNBA	Second Team	Teresa Weatherspoon	New York Liberty
All-WNBA	Second Team	Andrea Stinson	Charlotte Sting

=== Players of the Week ===
Week ending	Player	Team
June 29	Ruthie Bolton-Holifield	Sacramento Monarchs
July 6	Sophia Witherspoon	New York Liberty
July 13	Andrea Stinson	Charlotte Sting
July 20	Cynthia Cooper	Houston Comets
July 27	Cynthia Cooper (2)	Houston Comets
August 3	Eva Nemcova	Cleveland Rockers
August 10	Tamecka Dixon	Los Angeles Sparks
August 17	Jennifer Gillom	Phoenix Mercury

== Coaches ==
=== Eastern Conference ===
- Charlotte Sting: Marynell Meadors
- Cleveland Rockers: Linda Hill-MacDonald
- Houston Comets: Van Chancellor
- New York Liberty: Nancy Darsch

=== Western Conference ===
- Los Angeles Sparks: Linda Sharp
- Phoenix Mercury: Cheryl Miller
- Sacramento Monarchs: Mary Murphy and Heidi VanDerveer
- Utah Starzz: Denise Taylor
