= 1998 WNBA season =

- League: Women's National Basketball Association
- Sport: Basketball
- Duration: June 11 – September 1, 1998
- Games: 30
- Teams: 10
- Total attendance: 1,630,315
- Average attendance: 10,869
- TV partner(s): ESPN, NBC, Lifetime

Draft
- Top draft pick: (Poland) Margo Dydek
- Picked by: Utah Starzz

Regular season
- Top seed: Houston Comets
- Season MVP: (United States) Cynthia Cooper-Dyke (Houston)
- Top scorer: (United States) Cynthia Cooper-Dyke (Houston)

Playoffs
- Finals champions: Houston Comets
- Runners-up: Phoenix Mercury
- Finals MVP: (United States) Cynthia Cooper-Dyke (Houston)

WNBA seasons
- ← 1997 1999 →

The 1998 WNBA season was the Women's National Basketball Association's second season. The 1998 season saw two expansion teams join the league, the Detroit Shock and Washington Mystics with an expansion draft being held on February 18, 1998. The expansion teams allowed the defending champions, Houston Comets, to move to the Western Conference. The regular season was extended from 28 games to 30 games. During the season, Kelly Boucher became the first Canadian to play in the league, suiting up for the Charlotte Sting. The season ended with the Comets winning their second WNBA championship.

== Regular season ==
=== Standings ===
Eastern Conference

Eastern Conference	W	L	PCT	Conf.	GB
Cleveland Rockers ^{x}	20	10	.667	12–4	–
Charlotte Sting ^{x}	18	12	.600	11–5	2.0
New York Liberty ^{o}	18	12	.600	8–8	2.0
Detroit Shock ^{o}	17	13	.567	8–8	3.0
Washington Mystics ^{o}	3	27	.100	1–15	17.0

Western Conference

Western Conference	W	L	PCT	Conf.	GB
Houston Comets ^{x}	27	3	.900	15–1	–
Phoenix Mercury ^{x}	19	11	.633	10–6	8.0
Los Angeles Sparks ^{o}	12	18	.400	6–10	15.0
Sacramento Monarchs ^{o}	8	22	.267	5–11	19.0
Utah Starzz ^{o}	8	22	.267	4–12	19.0

Note: Teams with an "X" clinched playoff spots.

== Playoffs ==
For the playoffs, the four teams with the best record in the league were seeded one to four. Houston was switched to the Western Conference so two Western Conference teams matched up in the WNBA Finals.

**Semifinals**; Best-of-3
1	**Houston**	**2**
4	Charlotte	0
2	Cleveland	1
3	**Phoenix**	**2**

**WNBA Championship**; Best-of-3
1	**Houston**	**2**
3	Phoenix	1

- **Bold** – Series winner
- Italic – Team with home-court advantage

== Awards ==
=== Individual ===
Award		Winner	Team
Most Valuable Player (MVP)		Cynthia Cooper	Houston Comets
Finals MVP		Cynthia Cooper	Houston Comets
Defensive Player of the Year		Teresa Weatherspoon	New York Liberty
Newcomer of the Year		Suzie McConnell Serio	Cleveland Rockers
Shooting Champions	**Field goal percentage**	Isabelle Fijalkowski	Cleveland Rockers
Shooting Champions	**Free throw percentage**	Sandy Brondello	Detroit Shock
Rookie of the Year		Tracy Reid	Charlotte Sting
Sportsmanship Award		Suzie McConnell Serio	Cleveland Rockers
Coach of the Year		Van Chancellor	Houston Comets

=== Team ===
Award		Player	Team
All-WNBA	First Team	Tina Thompson	Houston Comets
All-WNBA	First Team	Sheryl Swoopes	Houston Comets
All-WNBA	First Team	Jennifer Gillom	Phoenix Mercury
All-WNBA	First Team	Suzie McConnell-Serio	Cleveland Rockers
All-WNBA	First Team	Cynthia Cooper	Houston Comets
All-WNBA	Second Team	Eva Nemcova	Cleveland Rockers
All-WNBA	Second Team	Cindy Brown	Detroit Shock
All-WNBA	Second Team	Lisa Leslie	Los Angeles Sparks
All-WNBA	Second Team	Teresa Weatherspoon	New York Liberty
All-WNBA	Second Team	Andrea Stinson	Charlotte Sting

=== Players of the Week ===
Week ending	Player	Team
June 21	Lisa Leslie	Los Angeles Sparks
June 28	Andrea Stinson	Charlotte Sting
July 5	Cindy Brown	Detroit Shock
July 12	Jennifer Gillom	Phoenix Mercury
July 19	Tracy Reid	Charlotte Sting
July 27	Teresa Weatherspoon	New York Liberty
August 2	Cynthia Cooper	Houston Comets
August 10	Cynthia Cooper (2)	Houston Comets
August 17	Suzie McConnell-Serio	Cleveland Rockers

== Coaches ==
=== Eastern Conference ===
- Charlotte Sting: Marynell Meadors
- Cleveland Rockers: Linda Hill-MacDonald
- Detroit Shock: Nancy Lieberman
- New York Liberty: Nancy Darsch and Richie Adubato
- Washington Mystics: Jim Lewis and Cathy Parson

=== Western Conference ===
- Houston Comets: Van Chancellor
- Los Angeles Sparks: Julie Rousseau and Orlando Woolridge
- Phoenix Mercury: Cheryl Miller
- Sacramento Monarchs: Heidi VanDerveer
- Utah Starzz: Frank Layden
