= Charlotte Sting =

Defunct US women's basketball team

- Conference: Eastern Conference
- Leagues: WNBA
- Founded: 1997; 29 years ago
- Dissolved: 2007; 19 years ago
- History: Charlotte Sting; 1997–2006
- Arena: Charlotte Coliseum (1997–2005); Charlotte Bobcats Arena (2006)
- Location: Charlotte, North Carolina
- Team colors: Orange, blue, silver, black, white
- Ownership: Robert L. Johnson
- Conference titles: 1 (2001)

The Charlotte Sting were a Women's National Basketball Association (WNBA) team based in Charlotte, North Carolina, one of the league's eight original teams. The team disbanded on January 3, 2007.

The Sting was originally the sister organization of the Charlotte Hornets, until that NBA team relocated to New Orleans in 2002. Robert L. Johnson, founder of Black Entertainment Television, purchased the team in January 2003, shortly after he was announced as the principal owner of an NBA expansion franchise that replaced the departing Hornets.

== History ==
=== Early years ===
Charlotte Sting logo 1997–2003.

The Charlotte Sting was one of the eight original WNBA franchises that began play in 1997, and were then the sister team to the Charlotte Hornets. The Sting finished their first season with a 15–13 record and qualified for the first WNBA playoffs, but lost to eventual champions Houston Comets in the one-game semifinal.

The 1998 Sting finished the season with an 18–12 record. In the playoffs, the Sting once again lost the Eastern Conference semifinals to the Houston Comets, and the Comets once again took home the championship. During the 1998 WNBA season, Sting player Kelly Boucher became the first Canadian to play in the league.

In the 1998–1999 offseason, with the folding of the American Basketball League, the Sting added former ABL guard Dawn Staley to an already impressive roster that featured Vicky Bullett and Andrea Stinson. Their record, however, fell to 15–17 in 1999. It was still enough to qualify them for the playoffs, where they defeated the Detroit Shock in the opening round 60–54. In the Conference Finals, the Sting fell to the New York Liberty 2 games to 1.

The 2000 season was very disappointing for the Sting, with a final record of 8–24. They missed the playoffs for the first time in franchise history.

The 2001 Sting lost 10 of their first 11 games. But the team lost only four games after that, finishing with an 18–14 record. Although they had barely qualified for the playoffs as the No. 4 seed, in the first round the Sting upset first the No. 1 seeded Cleveland Rockers and then the No. 2 New York Liberty, beating each in three games. For the first time in franchise history, the Sting found themselves in the WNBA Finals. But the magic ended there for the Sting, as they were swept by the Los Angeles Sparks in two games.

The Sting posted a 18–14 record in the 2002 season, but were swept by the Washington Mystics in the first round of the playoffs.

After the 2001–2002 NBA season, the Charlotte Hornets relocated to New Orleans (see "New Orleans Hornets"), and the Sting did not relocate with them to New Orleans. For the 2003 season, the Sting had no brother team.

=== Late years ===
The NBA immediately announced, after the Hornets moved, that a new team would begin play in Charlotte starting in the 2004–2005 season. Shortly after, Robert L. Johnson was announced as owner of this new franchise. Johnson also bought the Sting to play as the sister team of the new Charlotte Bobcats.

The 2003 season saw yet another playoff appearance for the Sting. The franchise had posted an 18–16 record and tied with the Connecticut Sun for the No. 2 seed. The Sting played the same Sun in the playoffs, and were swept out in two games.

After the season, Johnson changed the Sting team colors from the Hornets' teal and purple to correspond with the Bobcats' blue and orange. There was some speculation that the team might get a new name, but a newly released mascot following the same Sting theme made that idea unlikely.

During the off-season, the team made several key roster additions to its established group of veterans. After trading Kelly Miller to the Indiana Fever in exchange for the 3rd overall pick in the WNBA draft, the Sting drafted Stanford University standout Nicole Powell. The Sting made four picks overall – including the second round pick of Penn State standout Kelly Mazzante.

The Sting did not make the playoffs in the 2004 season, as they posted a 16–18 record and finished one game out of the No. 4 seed. After the season, the Sting continued to build for the future, trading with the Sacramento Monarchs for Tangela Smith and a second-round draft pick in the 2006 draft in a deal that saw Nicole Powell traded to Sacramento. Having won the first pick in the 2005 WNBA draft, the Sting selected Minnesota player Janel McCarville.

The new-look Sting suffered a terrible 2005 season, posting the league's worst record at 6–28. During the season, the Sting traded veteran Dawn Staley to the Houston Comets and named Charlotte basketball icon Muggsy Bogues as their new head coach late in the season. The season also saw the team play its last game in the Charlotte Coliseum, the team's home arena since 1997.

The Sting moved into the Bobcats' new home, Charlotte Bobcats Arena, for the 2006 season. The Sting had a better season in 2006 than 2005, posting an 11–23 record. The Sting had a new arena and were clearly making progress in the rebuilding. Despite the growing number of successes on the court, the 2006 season proved to be the Sting's final season in the league.

== End of the Sting ==
On December 13, 2006, Bobcats Sports and Entertainment turned ownership of the team over to the league, citing low attendance in Charlotte (despite a new arena) and loss of revenue. An investment group in Kansas City had an interest in moving the Sting to Kansas City. The Sting were to play in the Sprint Center, which was due to open in the Fall of 2007. The city has not had an NBA team since the Kings' move to Sacramento, California after the 1984–85 season. Despite talk and deliberation between the league and the investors, the plans ultimately fell through. On January 3, 2007, the Bobcats announced that the fundraising effort by a group seeking to move the team to Kansas City had failed. The team folded immediately, and the players went to the other teams in the league via a dispersal draft.

== Season-by-season records ==
Season	Team	Conference		Regular season			Playoff Results	Head coach
Season	Team	Conference		W	L	PCT	Playoff Results	Head coach
Charlotte Sting
1997	1997	East	3rd	15	13	.536	Lost WNBA Semifinals (Houston, 0–1)	Marynell Meadors
1998	1998	East	2nd	18	12	.600	Lost WNBA Semifinals (Houston, 0–2)	Marynell Meadors
1999	1999	East	3rd	15	17	.469	Won Conference Semifinals (Detroit, 1–0); Lost Conference Finals (New York, 1–2)	M. Meadors (5–7); D. Hughes (10–10)
2000	2000	East	8th	8	24	.250		T.R. Dunn
2001	2001	East	4th	18	14	.563	Won Conference Semifinals (Cleveland, 2–1); Won Conference Finals (New York, 2–1); Lost WNBA Finals (Los Angeles, 0–2)	Anne Donovan
2002	2002	East	2nd	18	14	.563	Lost Conference Semifinals (Washington, 0–2)	Anne Donovan
2003	2003	East	2nd	18	16	.529	Lost Conference Semifinals (Connecticut, 0–2)	Trudi Lacey
Charlotte Sting
2004	2004	East	5th	16	18	.471		Trudi Lacey
2005	2005	East	6th	6	28	.176		T. Lacey (3–21); M. Bogues (3–7)
2006	2006	East	6th	11	23	.324		Muggsy Bogues
Regular season				143	179	.444	1 Conference Championship	
Playoffs				6	13	.316	0 WNBA Championships	

== Uniforms ==
- 1997–2003: on the road, teal with white and purple trim, Sting logo text on the chest. At home, white with teal and purple trim. Sting logo mascot on the shorts, similar to the Charlotte Hornets
- 2004–2006: on the road, orange with blue trim, Sting logo text on the chest. At home, white with orange trim. Sting logo mascot on the shorts, similar to the Charlotte Bobcats.

== Players ==
=== Retired numbers ===
Charlotte Sting retired numbers
No.	Player	Position	Tenure
32	Andrea Stinson	G	1997–2004

=== Notable players ===
- Cass Bauer-Bilodeau
- Vicky Bullett
- Sonia Chase
- Monique Currie
- Edniesha Curry
- Helen Darling
- Shalonda Enis
- Rhonda Mapp
- Kelly Mazzante
- Janel McCarville
- Kelly Miller
- Jia Perkins
- Nicole Powell
- Tracy Reid
- Charlotte Smith
- Tangela Smith
- Dawn Staley
- Andrea Stinson
- Tammy Sutton-Brown
- Tiffany Travis

=== Final roster ===
Charlotte Sting Final Roster
Head coach: Muggsy Bogues
Pos.	No.	Name		College
G	10	(United States)	LaToya Bond	University of Missouri
G	1	(United States)	Tasha Butts (IL)	Tennessee
G-F	25	(United States)	Monique Currie	Duke
G	30	(United States)	Helen Darling	Penn State
C	42	(United States)	Tye'sha Fluker	Tennessee
C	33	(Belarus)	Yelena Leuchanka (IL)	West Virginia
F-C	4	(United States)	Janel McCarville	Minnesota
F-G	2	(United States)	Sheri Sam	Vanderbilt
F-C	50	(United States)	Tangela Smith	Iowa
C	55	(Canada)	Tammy Sutton-Brown	Rutgers
F	12	(United States)	Ayana Walker	Louisiana Tech
(IL) – Inactive List

== Coaches and others ==
=== Head coaches ===
- Marynell Meadors (1997–1999)
- Dan Hughes (1999)
- T.R. Dunn (2000)
- Anne Donovan (2001–2002) (Hall of Famer)
- Trudi Lacey (2003–August 2, 2005)
- Tyrone "Muggsy" Bogues (August 3, 2005 – 2007)

=== General managers ===
- Marynell Meadors (1997–99)
- Bob Bass (1999-2003)
- Bernie Bickerstaff (2003)
- Trudi Lacey (2003–07)

=== Assistant coaches ===
- Dan Hughes (1999)

Sporting positions
Preceded by New York Liberty	WNBA Eastern Conference Champions; 2001 (First title)	Succeeded by New York Liberty
