= 2000 Charlotte Sting season =

- Head coach: T.R. Dunn
- Arena: Charlotte Coliseum

Results
- Record: 8–24 (.250)
- Place: 8th (Eastern)
- Playoff finish: Did not qualify

The 2000 WNBA season was the fourth season for the Charlotte Sting. The team missed the playoffs for the first time in franchise history. They posted the worst record in the East and in franchise history, where that would remain until the 2005 season.

== Transactions ==
=== Miami Sol expansion draft ===
The following players were selected in the Miami Sol expansion draft from the Charlotte Sting:

Player	Nationality	School/Team/Country
Sharon Manning	United States	NC State
Stephanie White-McCarty	United States	Purdue

=== WNBA draft ===
Round	Pick	Player	Nationality	School/Team/Country
1	11	Summer Erb	United States	NC State
2	27	Tiffany Travis	United States	Florida
3	34	Jill Morton	United States	Louisville
3	43	Peppi Browne	United States	Duke
4	59	Shaka Massey	United States	Louisiana Tech

=== Transactions ===
Date	Transaction
October 28, 1999	Hired T.R. Dunn as Head Coach
December 15, 1999	Lost Sharon Manning and Stephanie White-McCarty to the Miami Sol in the WNBA expansion draft
January 19, 2000	Traded Vicky Bullett to the Washington Mystics in exchange for Shalonda Enis and a 2000 3rd Round Pick
April 25, 2000	Drafted Summer Erb, Tiffany Travis, Jill Morton, Peppi Browne and Shaka Massey in the 2000 WNBA draft
May 20, 2000	Signed Trisha Stafford-Odom
October 11, 2000	Traded Rhonda Mapp and E.C. Hill to the Los Angeles Sparks in exchange for Allison Feaster and Clarisse Machanguana
November 7, 2000	Traded Tracy Reid to the Miami Sol in exchange for Shantia Owens

== Roster ==
2000 Charlotte Sting roster
Players
Coaches

Pos.	No.	Nat.	Name	Height	Weight	DOB	From	Yrs
C	34	(United States)	Bauer-Bilodeau, Cass	6' 4" (1.93m)	180 lb (82kg)	1972-06-27	Montana State	1
F	45	(United States)	Braziel, Angie	6' 2" (1.88m)	169 lb (77kg)	1976-09-18	Texas Tech	1
F/C	7	(United States)	Enis, Shalonda	6' 1" (1.85m)	185 lb (84kg)	1974-12-03	Alabama	1
F/C	3	(United States)	Erb, Summer	6' 1" (1.85m)	185 lb (84kg)	1974-12-03	NC State	R
G	10	(United States)	Hill, E. C.	5' 8" (1.73m)	140 lb (64kg)	1971-07-06	Northern Illinois	R
G	24	(United States)	Johnson, Niesa	5' 9" (1.75m)	146 lb (66kg)	1973-02-07	Alabama	1
G/F		(United States)	Jones, Larecha	6' 1" (1.85m)	180 lb (82kg)	1977-07-24	Ohio State	R
C	51	(United States)	Mapp, Rhonda	6' 2" (1.88m)	190 lb (86kg)	1969-10-13	NC State	3
G/F	0	(United States)	Reid, Tracy	5' 11" (1.8m)	150 lb (68kg)	1976-11-01	North Carolina	2
F	44	(United States)	Smith, Charlotte	6' 0" (1.83m)	148 lb (67kg)	1973-08-23	North Carolina	1
G	5	(United States)	Staley, Dawn	5' 6" (1.68m)	134 lb (61kg)	1970-05-04	Virginia	1
G	32	(United States)	Stinson, Andrea	5' 10" (1.78m)	158 lb (72kg)	1967-11-25	NC State	3
F	12	(United States)	Travis, Tiffany	5' 11" (1.8m)	145 lb (66kg)	1978-03-20	Florida	R

Head coach
(United States) T. R. Dunn (Alabama)

Legend

- (C) Team captain
- (DP) Unsigned draft pick
- (FA) Free agent
- (S) Suspended
- Injured

== Schedule ==
=== Regular season ===
2000 game log
Total: 8–24 (Home: 4–11; Road: 4–13)
June: 2–12 (Home: 0–7; Road: 2–5)

Game	Date	Team	Score	High points	High rebounds	High assists	Location Attendance	Record
1	June 1	@ Orlando	L 79-82	Andrea Stinson (18)	Angie Braziel (6)	Andrea Stinson (7)	TD Waterhouse Centre	0–1
2	June 3	Miami	L 63-74	Andrea Stinson (22)	Tiffany Travis (5)	Dawn Staley (7)	Charlotte Coliseum	0–2
3	June 5	Cleveland	L 53-69	Rhonda Mapp (17)	Rhonda Mapp (7)	Dawn Staley (7)	Charlotte Coliseum	0–3
4	June 9	Seattle	L 62-67	Rhonda Mapp (19)	Andrea Stinson (6)	Dawn Staley (8)	Charlotte Coliseum	0–4
5	June 10	Orlando	L 71-74	Andrea Stinson (18)	Smith; Stinson (6)	Dawn Staley (7)	Charlotte Coliseum	0–5
6	June 12	@ Detroit	W 78-67	Mapp; Stinson (21)	Rhonda Mapp (15)	Rhonda Mapp (5)	The Palace of Auburn Hills	1–5
7	June 15	@ Utah	L 68-96	Andrea Stinson (18)	Andrea Stinson (7)	Dawn Staley (6)	Delta Center	1–6
8	June 17	@ Sacramento	L 63-74	Dawn Staley (18)	Rhonda Mapp (10)	Smith; Staley (4)	Charlotte Coliseum	1–7
9	June 18	@ Los Angeles	L 62-70	Summer Erb (21)	Charlotte Smith (10)	Dawn Staley (6)	Great Western Forum	1–8
10	June 20	@ Portland	W 87-85 (OT)	Andrea Stinson (25)	Enis; Travis (6)	Dawn Staley (8)	Rose Garden	2–8
11	June 22	Phoenix	L 57-90	Andrea Stinson (20)	Erb; Reid (6)	Dawn Staley (6)	Charlotte Coliseum	2–9
12	June 24	@ Orlando	L 68-69	Reid; Stinson; Travis (13)	Rhonda Mapp (15)	Dawn Staley (8)	Charlotte Coliseum	2–10
13	June 25	Detroit	L 81-84	Shalonda Enis (18)	Summer Erb (8)	Dawn Staley (9)	Charlotte Coliseum	2–11
14	June 28	Houston	L 66-76	Mapp; Stinson (14)	Enis; Travis (5)	Dawn Staley (9)	Charlotte Coliseum	2–12

July: 5–9 (Home: 3–3; Road: 2–6)

Game	Date	Team	Score	High points	High rebounds	High assists	Location Attendance	Record
15	July 1	Washington	L 74-78	Dawn Staley (19)	Andrea Stinson (7)	Dawn Staley (5)	Charlotte Coliseum	2–13
16	July 5	Miami	W 76-70	Rhonda Mapp (20)	Rhonda Mapp (9)	Dawn Staley (6)	Charlotte Coliseum	3–13
17	July 7	@ Houston	L 71-86	Andrea Stinson (19)	Rhonda Mapp (8)	Dawn Staley (7)	Compaq Center	3–14
18	July 8	Cleveland	L 59-80	Andrea Stinson (18)	Rhonda Mapp (8)	Dawn Staley (5)	Charlotte Coliseum	3–15
19	July 10	@ Cleveland	L 65-72	Rhonda Mapp (17)	Rhonda Mapp (12)	Dawn Staley (8)	Gund Arena	3–16
20	July 12	@ New York	L 70-84	Andrea Stinson (21)	Mapp; Reid (6)	Charlotte Smith (4)	Madison Square Garden	3–17
21	July 15	@ Washington	W 76-73	Andrea Stinson (24)	Mapp; Stinson (6)	Dawn Staley (7)	MCI Center	4–17
22	July 21	Portland	W 73-64	Dawn Staley (18)	Bauer-Bilodeau; Reid; Staley (5)	Andrea Stinson (8)	Charlotte Coliseum	5–17
23	July 22	@ Indiana	L 59-80	Rhonda Mapp (18)	Tracy Reid (7)	Bauer-Bilodeau; Mapp; Stinson; Staley (2)	Conseco Fieldhouse	5–18
24	July 24	Indiana	W 82-78 (OT)	Andrea Stinson (24)	Mapp; Travis (7)	Dawn Staley (8)	Charlotte Coliseum	6–18
25	July 26	@ Washington	W 87-80	Andrea Stinson (33)	Charlotte Smith (9)	Dawn Staley (13)	MCI Center	7–18
26	July 28	New York	L 56-66	Charlotte Smith (17)	Tracy Reid (5)	Dawn Staley (6)	Charlotte Coliseum	7–19
27	July 29	@ Detroit	L 72-75	Rhonda Mapp (25)	Rhonda Mapp (12)	Andrea Stinson (5)	The Palace of Auburn Hills	7–20
28	July 31	@ New York	L 56-81	Andrea Stinson (18)	Rhonda Mapp (9)	Dawn Staley (4)	Madison Square Garden	7–21

August: 1–3 (Home: 1–1; Road: 0–2)

Game	Date	Team	Score	High points	High rebounds	High assists	Location Attendance	Record
29	August 4	@ Miami	L 50-60	Andrea Stinson (14)	Rhonda Mapp (10)	Mapp; Staley; Stinson (4)	American Airlines Arena	7–22
30	August 5	Utah	W 84-82	Andrea Stinson (23)	Rhonda Mapp (5)	Dawn Staley (10)	Charlotte Coliseum	8–22
31	August 8	Minnesota	L 67-76	Andrea Stinson (15)	Angie Braziel (7)	Smith; Staley (5)	Charlotte Coliseum	8–23
32	August 9	@ Indiana	L 51-67	Andrea Stinson (17)	Reid; Smith (9)	Charlotte Smith (3)	Conseco Fieldhouse	8–24

=== Season standings ===
Eastern Conference	W	L	PCT	Conf.	GB
New York Liberty ^{x}	20	12	.625	14–7	–
Cleveland Rockers ^{x}	17	15	.531	13–8	3.0
Orlando Miracle ^{x}	16	16	.500	13–8	4.0
Washington Mystics ^{x}	14	18	.438	13–8	6.0
Detroit Shock ^{o}	14	18	.438	10–11	6.0
Miami Sol ^{o}	13	19	.406	9–12	7.0
Indiana Fever ^{o}	9	23	.281	7–14	11.0
Charlotte Sting ^{o}	8	24	.250	5–16	12.0

== Statistics ==
Legend
GP	Games played	GS	Games started	MPG	Minutes per game	RPG	Rebounds per game
APG	Assists per game	SPG	Steals per game	BPG	Blocks per game	PPG	Points per game
FG%	Field-goal percentage	3P%	3-point field-goal percentage	FT%	Free-throw percentage	TO	Turnovers per game
PF	Fouls per game		Team leader		League leader

=== Regular season ===
Player	GP	GS	MPG	FG%	3P%	FT%	RPG	APG	SPG	BPG	PPG
Andrea Stinson	32	32	35.1	.462	.358	.739	4.3	3.8	1.7	0.7	17.7
Dawn Staley	32	32	34.3	.372	.330	.878	2.4	5.9	1.2	0.0	8.8
Rhonda Mapp	30	30	28.5	.460	.364	.830	6.8	2.1	1.0	0.8	11.9
Shalonda Enis	12	9	26.9	.394	.344	.767	3.8	0.8	0.8	0.1	11.6
Charlotte Smith	30	7	22.0	.352	.316	.800	3.5	1.8	0.5	0.6	5.2
Tracy Reid	29	17	21.4	.478	.000	.542	3.4	1.0	0.5	0.3	7.3
Tiffany Travis	32	12	17.9	.443	.480	.750	2.5	0.8	1.0	0.1	5.4
Cass Bauer-Bilodeau	29	18	13.7	.403	.000	.857	1.9	0.5	0.3	0.1	2.6
Niesa Johnson	6	0	13.0	.529	.400	1.000	0.7	1.8	0.7	0.0	4.3
Summer Erb	29	0	9.5	.438	.000	.651	2.2	0.3	0.3	0.2	3.2
Angie Braziel	22	3	9.2	.388	N/A	.684	1.5	0.2	0.2	0.0	2.3
E.C. Hill	26	0	8.2	.286	.227	.400	0.9	0.5	0.2	0.0	1.5
Larecha Jones	9	0	6.0	.421	.333	.500	0.6	0.2	0.0	0.1	2.1

^{‡}Waived/Released during the season
^{†}Traded during the season
^{≠}Acquired during the season
