= Atlantic Coast Conference women's basketball Rookie of the Year =

ACC women's basketball Player of the Year
- Awarded for: the most outstanding women's basketball freshman in the Atlantic Coast Conference
- Country: United States
- Presented by: Atlantic Coast Sports Media Association (1984–present)

History
- First award: 1984
- Most recent: Uche Izoje, Syracuse

The Atlantic Coast Conference women's basketball Rookie of the Year is a basketball award given to the women's basketball player in the Atlantic Coast Conference (ACC) voted as the most outstanding rookie. It has been presented since the 1983–84, by the Atlantic Coast Sports Media Association. The award was first given to Dawn Royster of North Carolina.

Duke has the most winners with 10 all-time.

== Key ==
†	Co-Freshman of the Year
*	Awarded a national Freshman of the Year award: USBWA National Freshman of the Year (USBWA) WBCA Freshman of the Year (WBCA)

== Winners ==
Season	Player	School	Position	National Freshman of the Year Awards	Reference
1983–84	Dawn Royster	North Carolina	C	—	
1984–85	Chris Moreland	Duke	F	—	
1985–86	Katie Meier	Duke	G	—	
1986–87	Beth Hunt	Maryland	F	—	
1987–88	Carla Holmes	Maryland	G	—	
1988–89	Dawn Staley	Virginia	PG	—	
1989–90	Kerry Boyatt-Hall	Clemson	G/F	—	
1990–91	Bonnie Rimkus	Maryland	F/C	—	
1991–92	Charlotte Smith	North Carolina	F	—	
1992–93	Tracy Connor	Wake Forest	C	—	
1993–94	Tora Suber	Virginia	G	—	
1994–95	Chasity Melvin	NC State	PF/C	—	
1995–96	Chanel Wright	North Carolina	G/F	—	
1996–97	Katie Smrcka-Duffy	NC State	G	—	
1997–98	Nikki Teasley	North Carolina	PG	—	
1998–99	Niesha Butler	Georgia Tech	G	—	
1999–00	Schuye LaRue	Virginia	F	—	
2000–01	Alana Beard*	Duke	SG/SF	USBWA	
2001–02	Brandi Teamer	Virginia	F	—	
2002–03	La'Tangela Atkinson	North Carolina	G/F	—	
2003–04	Camille Little	North Carolina	G/F	—	
2004–05	Crystal Langhorne	Maryland	PF/C	—	
2005–06	Marissa Coleman	Maryland	SG/SF	—	
2006–07	Monica Wright	Virginia	G	—	
2007–08	Stefanie Murphy	Boston College	F	—	
2008–09	Lynetta Kizer	Maryland	C	—	
2009–10	Marissa Kastanek	NC State	G	—	
2010–11	Alyssa Thomas	Maryland	PF	—	
2011–12	Elizabeth Williams*	Duke	PF/C	USBWA	
2012–13	Xylina McDaniel	North Carolina	F	—	
2013–14	Diamond DeShields*	North Carolina	SG	USBWA	
2014–15	Brianna Turner	Notre Dame	PF		
2015–16	Stephanie Watts	North Carolina	G	—	
2016–17	Francesca Pan	Georgia Tech	G	—	
2017–18	Janelle Bailey	North Carolina	C	—	
2018–19	Elizabeth Balogun	Georgia Tech	G/F	—	
2019–20	Elizabeth Kitley	Virginia Tech	C	—	
2020–21^{†}	Kamilla Cardoso	Syracuse	C	—	
2020–21^{†}	Maddy Westbeld	Notre Dame	F	—	
2021–22^{†}	Sonia Citron	Notre Dame	G	—	
2021–22^{†}	Shayeann Day-Wilson	Duke	G	—	
2022–23	Ta'Niya Latson*	Florida State	G	USBWA WBCA	
2023–24	Hannah Hidalgo	Notre Dame	G	—	
2024–25	Toby Fournier	Duke	F	—	
2025–26	Uche Izoje	Syracuse	C	—	

== Winners by school ==
School (year joined)	Winners	Years
North Carolina (1953)	10	1984, 1992, 1996, 1998, 2003, 2004, 2013, 2014, 2016, 2018
Maryland (1953)^{[b]}	7	1987, 1988, 1991, 2005, 2006, 2009, 2011
Duke (1953)	6	1985, 1986, 2001, 2012, 2022, 2025
Virginia (1953)	5	1989, 1994, 2000, 2002, 2007
Georgia Tech (1978)	3	1999, 2017, 2019
NC State (1953)	3	1995, 1997, 2010
Notre Dame (2013)	3	2015, 2022, 2024
Syracuse (2013)	2	2021, 2026
Boston College (2005)	1	2008
Florida State (1991)	1	2023
Virginia Tech (2004)	1	2020
Wake Forest (1953)	1	1993
Clemson (1953)	1	1990
Louisville (2014)	0	
Miami (FL) (2004)	0	—
California (2024)	0	—
Pittsburgh (2013)	0	—
SMU (2024)	0	—
Stanford (2024)	0	—

== Footnotes ==
- ^{b} The University of Maryland left the ACC to join the Big Ten in 2014.
