= WNBA triple-doubles =

List of triple-doubles recorded in the WNBA

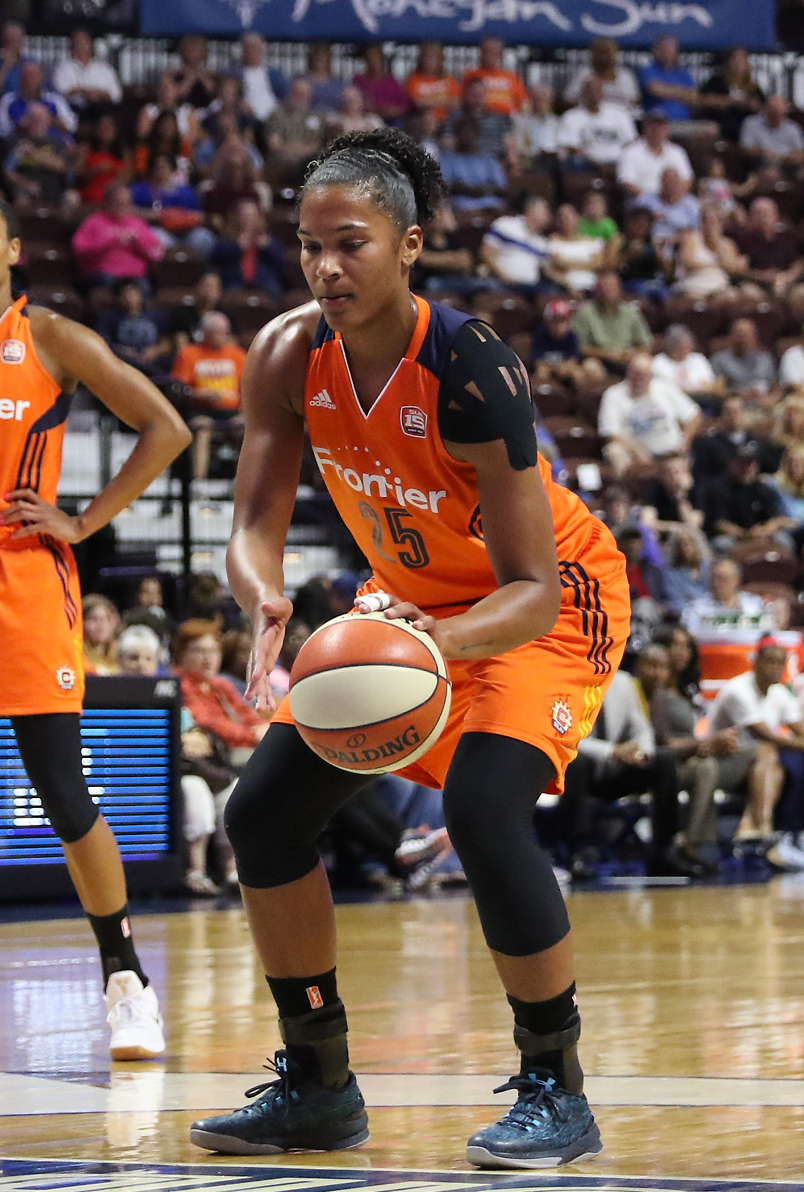
Alyssa Thomas of the Phoenix Mercury holds the WNBA record for career triple-doubles with twenty-nine.

A triple-double is achieved in basketball when a player accumulates a total of 10 or more in three of five statistical categories (points, rebounds, assists, steals, and blocks) in one game. The following lists triple-doubles attained in the Women's National Basketball Association (WNBA) from the league's founding in 1996 to the present.

As of the mid-2026 season, 68 triple-doubles have been recorded in the WNBA. Alyssa Thomas has the all-time record with thirty, and no other player has more than seven.

== Rarity ==
For several reasons, triple-doubles are more rare in the women's WNBA than in the men's NBA. Games are shorter in the WNBA, lasting 40 minutes compared to 48 minutes in the NBA. The WNBA has fewer games (fewer teams) in a season (44 vs 82). The playing style in the WNBA features more ball movement and teamwork compared to the NBA's reliance on star players.

== Individual achievement ==
Alyssa Thomas holds most WNBA records regarding triple-doubles by a considerable margin, holding the record for regular season (24), postseason (6), and overall (30); in contrast, the second-place in career regular season and overall triple-doubles, Jessica Shepard, has only posted seven in the regular season and zero in the playoffs, and no player has ever had more than one playoff triple-double. Thomas scored the first WNBA Finals triple-double (and only third ever in the playoffs) on September 15, 2022 against the Las Vegas Aces, and another the following game on September 18. Thomas recorded four of her career triple-doubles in the 2022 season, and her fifth through eleventh in the 2023 season. In August of the 2025 season, Thomas became the first player to record a triple-double in three straight games. Thomas is also the only player to post a triple-double with at least 15 rebounds and 15 assists, with her 2025 performance also setting the record for most assists in a triple-double at 17. Thomas was also the first player with a 20-plus rebound triple-double, a feat only matched by Shepard.

Sheryl Swoopes of the Houston Comets was the first player in the WNBA to put up a triple-double in both regular season and the postseason, posting the former in a blowout against the Detroit Shock in 1999 and the latter in 2005 against the Seattle Storm; it would take another 17 years for another player, Courtney Vandersloot of the Chicago Sky, to put up a triple-double in the playoffs, and Thomas is the only other to do so in the postseason. The second triple-double in WNBA history was by Margo Dydek, who also was the first to do so with blocks rather than assists; her ten blocks in a narrow win against the Orlando Miracle in 2001 was also a single-game record at that time. The third triple-double in WNBA history, performed by Lisa Leslie of the Los Angeles Sparks in 2004, was the second and last to be done with blocks rather than assists and was also the first to be done with over 20 points. It took 17 years for Sabrina Ionescu to become the second player with a 20-plus point triple-double, doing so in a New York Liberty game in 2021. In 2022, Ionescu also became the first to both achieve a triple-double in three quarters and register at least 12 of each statistic, and she remains the only player with a 30-plus point triple double. In 2022, Candace Parker became both the first WNBA player to reach three triple-doubles overall, as well as achieve two or more triple-doubles in the same season. In 2024, Caitlin Clark was the first WNBA rookie to record a triple-double.

== All WNBA triple-doubles ==
Below, playoff triple-doubles are highlighted in italics. Bold numbers indicate the statistics relevant to the triple-double.

Name	Team	Opponent	Date	Points	Rebounds	Assists	Steals	Blocks
Sheryl Swoopes	Houston Comets	Detroit Shock	July 27, 1999	14	15	**10**	3	2
Margo Dydek	Utah Starzz	Orlando Miracle	June 7, 2001	12	11	3	3	**10**
Lisa Leslie	Los Angeles Sparks	Detroit Shock	September 9, 2004	29	15	3	2	**10**
Deanna Nolan	Detroit Shock	Connecticut Sun	May 21, 2005	11	10	**11**	1	0
Sheryl Swoopes (2)	Houston Comets	Seattle Storm	September 3, 2005	14	10	**10**	2	0
Temeka Johnson	Seattle Storm	New York Liberty	July 24, 2014	13	10	**11**	1	0
Candace Parker	Los Angeles Sparks	San Antonio Stars	July 28, 2017	11	17	**11**	0	4
Courtney Vandersloot	Chicago Sky	Dallas Wings	July 20, 2018	13	10	**15**	1	1
Chelsea Gray	Los Angeles Sparks	Washington Mystics	July 7, 2019	13	10	**13**	0	0
Sabrina Ionescu	New York Liberty	Minnesota Lynx	May 18, 2021	26	10	**12**	0	1
Courtney Vandersloot (2)	Chicago Sky	Connecticut Sun	September 28, 2021	12	10	**18**	4	2
Candace Parker (2)	Chicago Sky	Washington Mystics	May 22, 2022	16	13	**10**	0	0
Sabrina Ionescu (2)	New York Liberty	Chicago Sky	June 12, 2022	27	13	**12**	0	0
Candace Parker (3)	Chicago Sky	Los Angeles Sparks	June 23, 2022	10	14	**10**	1	2
Moriah Jefferson	Minnesota Lynx	Dallas Wings	June 28, 2022	13	10	**10**	2	0
Sabrina Ionescu (3)	New York Liberty	Las Vegas Aces	July 6, 2022	31	13	**10**	0	0
Alyssa Thomas	Connecticut Sun	Minnesota Lynx	July 22, 2022	15	10	**12**	3	0
Alyssa Thomas (2)	Connecticut Sun	Phoenix Mercury	August 2, 2022	10	12	**10**	1	0
Alyssa Thomas (3)	Connecticut Sun	Las Vegas Aces	September 15, 2022	16	15	**11**	2	1
Alyssa Thomas (4)	Connecticut Sun	Las Vegas Aces	September 18, 2022	11	10	**11**	2	2
Alyssa Thomas (5)	Connecticut Sun	Seattle Storm	June 20, 2023	13	15	**12**	3	0
Alyssa Thomas (6)	Connecticut Sun	Chicago Sky	June 25, 2023	14	12	**11**	2	0
Alyssa Thomas (7)	Connecticut Sun	New York Liberty	June 27, 2023	11	10	**10**	4	1
Courtney Williams	Chicago Sky	Los Angeles Sparks	June 30, 2023	12	11	**13**	1	0
Sabrina Ionescu (4)	New York Liberty	Seattle Storm	July 25, 2023	12	12	**12**	2	0
Satou Sabally	Dallas Wings	New York Liberty	July 28, 2023	14	11	**10**	0	1
Alyssa Thomas (8)	Connecticut Sun	Minnesota Lynx	July 30, 2023	17	14	**11**	0	2
Alyssa Thomas (9)	Connecticut Sun	Minnesota Lynx	August 1, 2023	21	20	**12**	3	1
Natasha Howard	Dallas Wings	Chicago Sky	August 4, 2023	28	12	**11**	2	0
Chelsea Gray (2)	Las Vegas Aces	New York Liberty	August 18, 2023	22	11	**11**	3	0
Alyssa Thomas (10)	Connecticut Sun	Los Angeles Sparks	September 5, 2023	27	12	**14**	6	1
Sug Sutton	Phoenix Mercury	Las Vegas Aces	September 8, 2023	18	11	**11**	2	0
Courtney Williams (2)	Chicago Sky	Connecticut Sun	September 10, 2023	23	16	**13**	2	0
Alyssa Thomas (11)	Connecticut Sun	New York Liberty	October 1, 2023	17	15	**11**	2	0
Alyssa Thomas (12)	Connecticut Sun	Indiana Fever	May 14, 2024	13	10	**13**	3	0
Layshia Clarendon	Los Angeles Sparks	Atlanta Dream	May 15, 2024	11	10	**10**	2	0
Alyssa Thomas (13)	Connecticut Sun	Minnesota Lynx	July 4, 2024	13	10	**14**	0	0
Caitlin Clark	Indiana Fever	New York Liberty	July 6, 2024	19	12	**13**	2	0
Tina Charles	Atlanta Dream	Seattle Storm	August 29, 2024	19	17	**10**	4	1
Caitlin Clark (2)	Indiana Fever	Los Angeles Sparks	September 4, 2024	24	10	**10**	3	0
Alyssa Thomas (14)	Connecticut Sun	Los Angeles Sparks	August 8, 2024	12	10	**11**	2	1
Alyssa Thomas (15)	Connecticut Sun	Indiana Fever	September 22, 2024	12	10	**13**	0	0
Caitlin Clark (3)	Indiana Fever	Chicago Sky	May 17, 2025	20	10	**10**	2	4
Angel Reese	Chicago Sky	Connecticut Sun	June 14, 2025	11	13	**11**	3	2
Alyssa Thomas (16)	Phoenix Mercury	Dallas Wings	July 7, 2025	15	10	**15**	2	0
Skylar Diggins	2025 All-Star Game		July 19, 2025	11	11	**15**	0	0
Skylar Diggins (2)	Seattle Storm	Connecticut Sun	July 28, 2025	11	12	**11**	0	2
Jackie Young	Las Vegas Aces	Los Angeles Sparks	July 29, 2025	18	11	**11**	3	0
Alyssa Thomas (17)	Phoenix Mercury	Chicago Sky	August 3, 2025	10	10	**10**	2	1
Alyssa Thomas (18)	Phoenix Mercury	Connecticut Sun	August 5, 2025	13	12	**12**	3	0
Alyssa Thomas (19)	Phoenix Mercury	Indiana Fever	August 7, 2025	18	11	**10**	3	0
Julie Allemand	Los Angeles Sparks	Connecticut Sun	August 7, 2025	10	10	**11**	1	0
Alyssa Thomas (20)	Phoenix Mercury	Seattle Storm	August 18, 2025	19	10	**11**	3	0
Jessica Shepard	Minnesota Lynx	Indiana Fever	August 22, 2025	22	11	**11**	0	0
Alyssa Thomas (21)	Phoenix Mercury	Golden State Valkyries	August 22, 2025	13	12	**16**	0	2
Alyssa Thomas (22)	Phoenix Mercury	Los Angeles Sparks	August 26, 2025	12	15	**16**	3	0
Jackie Young (2)	Las Vegas Aces	Atlanta Dream	August 27, 2025	10	11	**10**	0	0
Alyssa Thomas (23)	Phoenix Mercury	Los Angeles Sparks	September 9, 2025	10	11	**10**	2	0
Alyssa Thomas (24)	Phoenix Mercury	New York Liberty	September 19, 2025	20	11	**10**	2	1
Alyssa Thomas (25)	Phoenix Mercury	Las Vegas Aces	October 10, 2025	17	12	**10**	0	0
Jessica Shepard (2)	Dallas Wings	Chicago Sky	May 20, 2026	18	10	**12**	0	0
Jessica Shepard (3)	Dallas Wings	Las Vegas Aces	May 28, 2026	22	20	**10**	0	0
Jessica Shepard (4)	Dallas Wings	New York Liberty	July 7, 2026	22	12	**11**	0	0
Alyssa Thomas (26)	Phoenix Mercury	Los Angeles Sparks	July 22, 2026	19	15	**11**	0	0
Jessica Shepard (5)	Dallas Wings	Portland Fire	July 22, 2026	18	15	**10**	0	0
Caitlin Clark (4)	Indiana Fever	Portland Fire	July 31, 2026	26	10	**10**	2	1
Jackie Young (3)	Las Vegas Aces	Atlanta Dream	August 3, 2026	28	11	**10**	0	0
Alyssa Thomas (27)	Phoenix Mercury	Chicago Sky	August 3, 2026	19	15	**12**	0	1
Alyssa Thomas (28)	Phoenix Mercury	Atlanta Dream	August 22, 2026	11	16	**10**	1	0
Jessica Shepard (6)	Dallas Wings	Los Angeles Sparks	September 17, 2026	13	11	**12**	1	0
Alyssa Thomas (29)	Phoenix Mercury	Dallas Wings	September 19, 2026	19	10	**11**	1	2
Alyssa Thomas (30)	Phoenix Mercury	Dallas Wings	September 21, 2026	15	11	**12**	0	1
Jessica Shepard (7)	Dallas Wings	Seattle Storm	September 24, 2026	20	11	**12**	1	0

== See also ==
- Double-double
