= 2001 Charlotte Sting season =

- Head coach: Anne Donovan
- Arena: Charlotte Coliseum

Results
- Record: 18–14 (.563)
- Place: 4th (Eastern)
- Playoff finish: Lost WNBA Finals (2-0) to Los Angeles Sparks

Media
- Television: WBTV (CBS 3); Fox Sports Net South

The 2001 WNBA season was the fifth season for the Charlotte Sting franchise. The team saw themselves in the WNBA Finals for the only time in their history. They lost the finals to the Los Angeles Sparks in a sweep.

== Transactions ==
=== WNBA draft ===
Round	Pick	Player	Nationality	School/Team/Country
1	2	Kelly Miller	United States	Georgia
2	18	Tammy Sutton-Brown	Canada	Rutgers
3	34	Jennifer Phillips	United States	Xavier
4	50	Reshea Bristol	United States	Arizona

=== Transactions ===
Date	Transaction
February 22, 2001	Fired T.R. Dunn as Head Coach
March 31, 2001	Hired Anne Donovan as Head Coach
April 20, 2001	Drafted Kelly Miller, Tammy Sutton-Brown, Jennifer Phillips and Reshea Bristol in the 2001 WNBA draft
April 30, 2001	Signed Marte Alexander
May 7, 2001	Waived Jennifer Phillips
May 9, 2001	Signed Tombi Bell
May 10, 2001	Waived Angie Braziel and Larecha Jones
May 10, 2001	Suspended contract of Shantia Owens
May 13, 2001	Waived Marte Alexander
May 27, 2001	Traded Cass Bauer-Bilodeau to the Washington Mystics in exchange for Keisha Anderson
May 27, 2001	Waived Niesa Johnson and Tombi Bell
June 22, 2001	Traded a 2002 2nd Round Pick to the Phoenix Mercury in exchange for Tonya Edwards
July 2, 2001	Waived Reshea Bristol

== Roster ==
2001 Charlotte Sting roster
Players
Coaches

Pos.	No.	Nat.	Name	Height	Weight	DOB	From	Yrs
G	20	(United States)	Anderson, Keisha	5' 7" (1.7m)	125 lb (57kg)	1974-05-08	Wisconsin	1
G	10	(United States)	Bristol, Reshea	5' 10" (1.78m)		1978-02-10	Arizona	R
G	13	(United States)	Edwards, Tonya	5' 10" (1.78m)	160 lb (73kg)	1968-03-13	Tennessee	2
F/C	7	(United States)	Enis, Shalonda	6' 1" (1.85m)	185 lb (84kg)	1974-12-03	Alabama	2
C	3	(United States)	Erb, Summer	6' 6" (1.98m)	240 lb (109kg)	1977-07-25	NC State	1
F	21	(United States)	Feaster, Allison	5' 11" (1.8m)	168 lb (76kg)	1976-02-11	Harvard	3
F/C	33	(People's Republic of Mozambique)	Machanguana, Clarisse	6' 5" (1.96m)	180 lb (82kg)	1976-10-04	Old Dominion	2
G	8	(United States)	Miller, Kelly	5' 10" (1.78m)	140 lb (64kg)	1978-09-06	Georgia	R
F	23	(United States)	Smith, Charlotte	6' 0" (1.83m)	148 lb (67kg)	1973-08-23	North Carolina	2
G	5	(United States)	Staley, Dawn	5' 6" (1.68m)	134 lb (61kg)	1970-05-04	Virginia	2
G	32	(United States)	Stinson, Andrea	5' 10" (1.78m)	158 lb (72kg)	1967-11-25	NC State	4
C	55	(Canada)	Sutton-Brown, Tammy	6' 4" (1.93m)	199 lb (90kg)	1978-01-27	Rutgers	R

Head coach
(United States) Anne Donovan (Old Dominion)

Legend

- (C) Team captain
- (DP) Unsigned draft pick
- (FA) Free agent
- (S) Suspended
- Injured

== Schedule ==
=== Regular season ===
2001 game log
Total: 18–14 (Home: 11–5; Road: 7–9)
June: 4–10 (Home: 2–4; Road: 2–6)

Game	Date	Team	Score	High points	High rebounds	High assists	Location Attendance	Record
1	June 2	Los Angeles	L 67–76	Andrea Stinson (21)	Clarisse Machanguana (9)	Dawn Staley (9)	Charlotte Coliseum	0–1
2	June 5	@ Phoenix	L 69–76	Andrea Stinson (21)	Clarisse Machanguana (12)	Dawn Staley (9)	America West Arena	0–2
3	June 7	@ Sacramento	L 65–77	Allison Feaster (23)	Allison Feaster (7)	Dawn Staley (9)	ARCO Arena	0–3
4	June 9	@ Orlando	W 86–79	Andrea Stinson (25)	Tammy Sutton-Brown (5)	Dawn Staley (9)	TD Waterhouse Centre	1–3
5	June 12	@ New York	L 70–79	Andrea Stinson (22)	Clarisse Machanguana (8)	Dawn Staley (3)	Madison Square Garden	1–4
6	June 14	Utah	L 59–73	Andrea Stinson (15)	Feaster; Stinson (6)	Dawn Staley (7)	Charlotte Coliseum	1–5
7	June 16	Detroit	L 69–72 (2OT)	Shalonda Enis (11)	Enis; Stinson (8)	Feaster; Staley (4)	Charlotte Coliseum	1–6
8	June 18	@ Seattle	L 52–60	Andrea Stinson (13)	Tammy Sutton-Brown (9)	Andrea Stinson (6)	KeyArena	1–7
9	June 19	@ Los Angeles	L 69–73	Dawn Staley (18)	Summer Erb (10)	Dawn Staley (7)	Staples Center	1–8
10	June 22	@ Portland	L 62–66 (OT)	Dawn Staley (14)	Andrea Stinson (11)	Andrea Stinson (5)	Rose Garden	1–9
11	June 24	Sacramento	L 82–85 (OT)	Andrea Stinson (24)	Andrea Stinson (9)	Dawn Staley (8)	Charlotte Coliseum	1–10
12	June 27	Detroit	W 74–50	Andrea Stinson (23)	Clarisse Machanguana (9)	Dawn Staley (11)	Charlotte Coliseum	2–10
13	June 29	@ Indiana	W 75–67	Tammy Sutton-Brown (20)	Tammy Sutton-Brown (10)	Dawn Staley (10)	Conseco Fieldhouse	3–10
14	June 30	Cleveland	W 58–55	Tammy Sutton-Brown (14)	Allison Feaster (11)	Dawn Staley (5)	Charlotte Coliseum	4–10

July : 8–4 (Home: 7–1; Road: 1–3)

Game	Date	Team	Score	High points	High rebounds	High assists	Location Attendance	Record
15	July 3	New York	W 66–61	Andrea Stinson (20)	Tammy Sutton-Brown (7)	Dawn Staley (8)	Charlotte Coliseum	5–10
16	July 6	@ Detroit	W 67–50	Andrea Stinson (17)	Charlotte Smith (7)	Smith; Staley (9)	The Palace of Auburn Hills	6–10
17	July 7	Seattle	W 48–38	Dawn Staley (15)	Shalonda Enis (7)	Dawn Staley (5)	Charlotte Coliseum	7–10
18	July 12	Orlando	L 69–72	Feaster; Smith (13)	Charlotte Smith (7)	Edwards; Feaster; Staley; Stinson (4)	Charlotte Coliseum	7–11
19	July 14	Indiana	W 71–58	Allison Feaster (18)	Charlotte Smith (6)	Dawn Staley (9)	Charlotte Coliseum	8–11
20	July 18	@ Miami	L 48–68	Dawn Staley (13)	Shalonda Enis (8)	Dawn Staley (4)	American Airlines Arena	8–12
21	July 20	Orlando	W 72–65	Allison Feaster (19)	Allison Feaster (7)	Dawn Staley (9)	Charlotte Coliseum	9–12
22	July 21	@ Cleveland	L 41–56	Dawn Staley (9)	Andrea Stinson (6)	Dawn Staley (4)	Gund Arena	9–13
23	July 24	Indiana	W 75–66	Dawn Staley (18)	Clarisse Machanguana (10)	Staley; Stinson (5)	Charlotte Coliseum	10–13
24	July 26	Washington	W 62–60	Andrea Stinson (15)	Charlotte Smith (10)	Smith; Staley (3)	Charlotte Coliseum	11–13
25	July 29	@ Washington	L 42–55	Andrea Stinson (10)	Tammy Sutton-Brown (6)	Smith; Staley (2)	MCI Center	11–14
26	July 31	Miami	W 63–45	Allison Feaster (18)	Smith; Sutton-Brown (4)	Dawn Staley (5)	Charlotte Coliseum	12–14

August : 6–0 (Home: 2–0; Road: 4–0)

Game	Date	Team	Score	High points	High rebounds	High assists	Location Attendance	Record
27	August 3	@ Minnesota	W 72–64	Staley; Stinson (16)	Feaster; Machanguana; Staley (5)	Andrea Stinson (4)	Target Center	13–14
28	August 4	Houston	W 54–49	Allison Feaster (13)	Allison Feaster (9)	Dawn Staley (5)	Charlotte Coliseum	14–14
29	August 6	@ Washington	W 65–60	Dawn Staley (13)	Tammy Sutton-Brown (7)	Andrea Stinson (7)	MCI Center	15–14
30	August 10	@ Cleveland	W 55–53	Andrea Stinson (21)	Tammy Sutton-Brown (9)	Dawn Staley (5)	Gund Arena	16–14
31	August 11	New York	W 80–60	Andrea Stinson (21)	Shalonda Enis (7)	Dawn Staley (6)	Charlotte Coliseum	17–14
32	August 14	@ Miami	W 48–41	Stinson; Sutton-Brown (8)	Allison Feaster (9)	Dawn Staley (5)	American Airlines Arena	18–14

2001 season schedule

=== Playoffs ===
2001 playoff game log
First round vs. Cleveland Rockers
Won Series: 2–1

Game	Date	Team	Score	High points	High rebounds	High assists	Location Attendance	Record
1	August 16	Cleveland	W 53–46	Andrea Stinson (16)	Andrea Stinson (6)	Dawn Staley (5)	Charlotte Coliseum	1–0
2	August 18	@ Cleveland	L 51–69	Allison Feaster (11)	Andrea Stinson (5)	Dawn Staley (6)	Gund Arena	1–1
3	August 20	@ Cleveland	W 72–64	Tonya Edwards (15)	Shalonda Enis (9)	Dawn Staley (8)	Gund Arena	2–1

Conference Finals vs. New York Liberty
Won Series: 2–1

Game	Date	Team	Score	High points	High rebounds	High assists	Location Attendance	Record
1	August 24	New York	L 57–61	Dawn Staley (14)	Andrea Stinson (7)	Dawn Staley (5)	Charlotte Coliseum	1–0
2	August 26	@ New York	W 62–53	Staley; Stinson (18)	Charlotte Smith (9)	Andrea Stinson (8)	Madison Square Garden	1–1
3	August 27	@ New York	W 48–44	Dawn Staley (17)	Andrea Stinson (8)	Andrea Stinson (4)	Madison Square Garden	2–1

Championship vs. Los Angeles Sparks
Lost Series: 0–2

Game	Date	Team	Score	High points	High rebounds	High assists	Location Attendance	Record
1	August 30	Los Angeles	L 66–75	Andrea Stinson (18)	Allison Feaster (5)	Andrea Stinson (5)	Charlotte Coliseum	0–1
2	September 1	@ Los Angeles	L 54–82	Tammy Sutton-Brown (12)	Charlotte Smith (8)	Dawn Staley (5)	Staples Center	0–2

2001 playoff schedule

=== Season standings ===
Eastern Conference	W	L	PCT	Conf.	GB
Cleveland Rockers ^{x}	22	10	.688	15–6	–
New York Liberty ^{x}	21	11	.656	13–8	1.0
Miami Sol ^{x}	20	12	.625	14–7	2.0
Charlotte Sting ^{x}	18	14	.563	15–6	4.0
Orlando Miracle ^{o}	13	19	.406	9–12	9.0
Indiana Fever ^{o}	10	22	.313	7–14	12.0
Detroit Shock ^{o}	10	22	.313	7–14	12.0
Washington Mystics ^{o}	10	22	.313	4–17	12.0

== Statistics ==
Legend
GP	Games played	GS	Games started	MPG	Minutes per game	RPG	Rebounds per game
APG	Assists per game	SPG	Steals per game	BPG	Blocks per game	PPG	Points per game
FG%	Field-goal percentage	3P%	3-point field-goal percentage	FT%	Free-throw percentage	TO	Turnovers per game
PF	Fouls per game		Team leader		League leader

=== Regular season ===
Player	GP	GS	MPG	FG%	3P%	FT%	RPG	APG	SPG	BPG	PPG
Dawn Staley	32	32	36.0	.381	.371	.895	2.2	5.6	1.6	0.0	9.3
Allison Feaster	32	32	31.5	.375	.327	.921	4.8	1.4	0.9	0.3	11.4
Andrea Stinson	32	32	31.4	.484	.446	.797	4.3	2.8	1.3	0.6	14.1
Charlotte Smith	30	24	22.6	.390	.313	.734	3.4	1.7	0.5	0.4	5.7
Tammy Sutton-Brown	29	21	20.8	.490	N/A	.722	4.4	0.4	0.7	1.3	6.8
Shalonda Enis	32	11	19.5	.418	.452	.714	3.5	0.4	0.3	0.2	6.0
Clarisse Machanguana	30	8	19.3	.500	N/A	.649	4.0	0.6	0.5	0.5	5.4
Tonya Edwards	22	0	16.9	.340	.227	.730	2.0	1.4	0.6	0.3	4.5
Kelly Miller	26	0	8.7	.386	.368	.800	1.1	0.5	0.3	0.0	2.1
Summer Erb	18	0	8.2	.429	N/A	.857	1.9	0.2	0.1	0.3	3.0
Keisha Anderson	18	0	5.7	.125	.000	.800	0.8	0.8	0.3	0.0	0.7
Reshea Bristol	1	0	5.0	.000	N/A	N/A	2.0	0.0	0.0	0.0	0.0

^{‡}Waived/Released during the season
^{†}Traded during the season
^{≠}Acquired during the season
