= Summer Erb =

American basketball player (born 1977)

Personal information
- Born: July 25, 1977 (age 49) Lakewood, Ohio, U.S.
- Listed height: 6 ft 6 in (1.98 m)

Career information
- High school: Lakewood (Lakewood, Ohio)
- College: Purdue (1995); NC State (1996–2000)
- WNBA draft: 2000: 1st round, 11th overall pick
- Drafted by: Charlotte Sting
- Position: Center

Career history
- 2000–2002: Charlotte Sting

Career highlights
- ACC Player of the Year (1999); 2× First-team All-ACC (1999, 2000)
- Stats at Basketball Reference
Medals
Women's basketball
Representing the United States
Jones Cup
Gold medal – first place	1998 Taipei	Team competition

Summer Erb (born July 25, 1977) is an American basketball player. She played for the Charlotte Sting in 2002 as center. She is 198 cm tall and 109 kg. She also played for the Bursa Yıldırım and the Fenerbahçe İstanbul in Turkey.

She was born in Lakewood, Ohio. After spending her freshman season (1996) playing for the Purdue University Boilermakers, she transferred to North Carolina State University to complete her college eligibility.

== Career statistics ==
=== WNBA ===
Legend
GP	Games played	GS	Games started	MPG	Minutes per game	RPG	Rebounds per game
APG	Assists per game	SPG	Steals per game	BPG	Blocks per game	PPG	Points per game
TO	Turnovers per game	FG%	Field-goal percentage	3P%	3-point field-goal percentage	FT%	Free-throw percentage
**Bold**	Career best	°	League leader

==== Regular season ====
Year	Team	GP	GS	MPG	FG%	3P%	FT%	RPG	APG	SPG	BPG	TO	PPG
2000	Charlotte	29	0	9.5	43.8	0.0	65.1	2.2	**0.3**	0.3	0.2	**0.6**	**3.2**
2001	Charlotte	18	0	8.2	42.9	0.0	**85.7**	1.9	0.2	0.1	0.3	**0.6**	3.0
2002	Charlotte	**31**	**3**	**11.0**	**56.5**	0.0	72.0	**2.3**	**0.3**	**0.4**	**0.4**	1.1	2.8
Career	3 years, 1 team	78	3	9.8	48.0	0.0	71.9	2.2	0.3	0.3	0.3	0.8	3.0

==== Playoffs ====
Year	Team	GP	GS	MPG	FG%	3P%	FT%	RPG	APG	SPG	BPG	TO	PPG
2001	Charlotte	**4**	0	3.8	**80.0**	0.0	0.0	**1.0**	0.0	0.0	0.0	0.8	2.0
2002	Charlotte	2	0	**8.5**	60.0	0.0	**100.0**	0.5	0.0	0.0	**0.5**	**0.0**	**3.5**
Career	3 years, 1 team	6	0	5.3	70.0	0.0	100.0	0.8	0.0	0.0	0.2	0.5	2.5

=== College ===
Legend
GP	Games played	GS	Games started	MPG	Minutes per game
FG%	Field goal percentage	3P%	3-point field goal percentage	FT%	Free throw percentage
RPG	Rebounds per game	APG	Assists per game	SPG	Steals per game
BPG	Blocks per game	PPG	Points per game	**Bold**	Career high

Year	Team	GP	Points	FG%	3P%	FT%	RPG	APG	SPG	BPG	PPG
1995–96	Purdue	28	96	46.3%	0.0%	64.7%	2.0	0.2	0.2	0.1	3.4

Year	Team	GP	Points	FG%	3P%	FT%	RPG	APG	SPG	BPG	PPG
1996–97	NC State	Sat due to NCAA transfer rules									
1997–98	NC State	**32**	244	51.0%	42.9%	73.8%	4.3	0.8	0.6	0.5	7.6
1998–99	NC State	29	**624**	**59.8%**	33.3%	70.6%	**9.9**	0.8	0.8	0.7	**21.5**°
1999-00	NC State	22	353	54.7%	**75.0%**	**76.2%**	8.5	**1.3**	**1.1**	**1.0**	16.0
Career		111	1221	56.3%	50.0%	72.9%	5.5	0.7	0.6	0.5	11.0

== USA Basketball ==
Erb was named to the team representing the US at the 1998 William Jones Cup competition in Taipei, Taiwan. The USA team won all five games, earning the gold medal for the competition. Erb scored 23 points over the five games.
