= Alyssa Thomas =

American basketball player (born 1992)

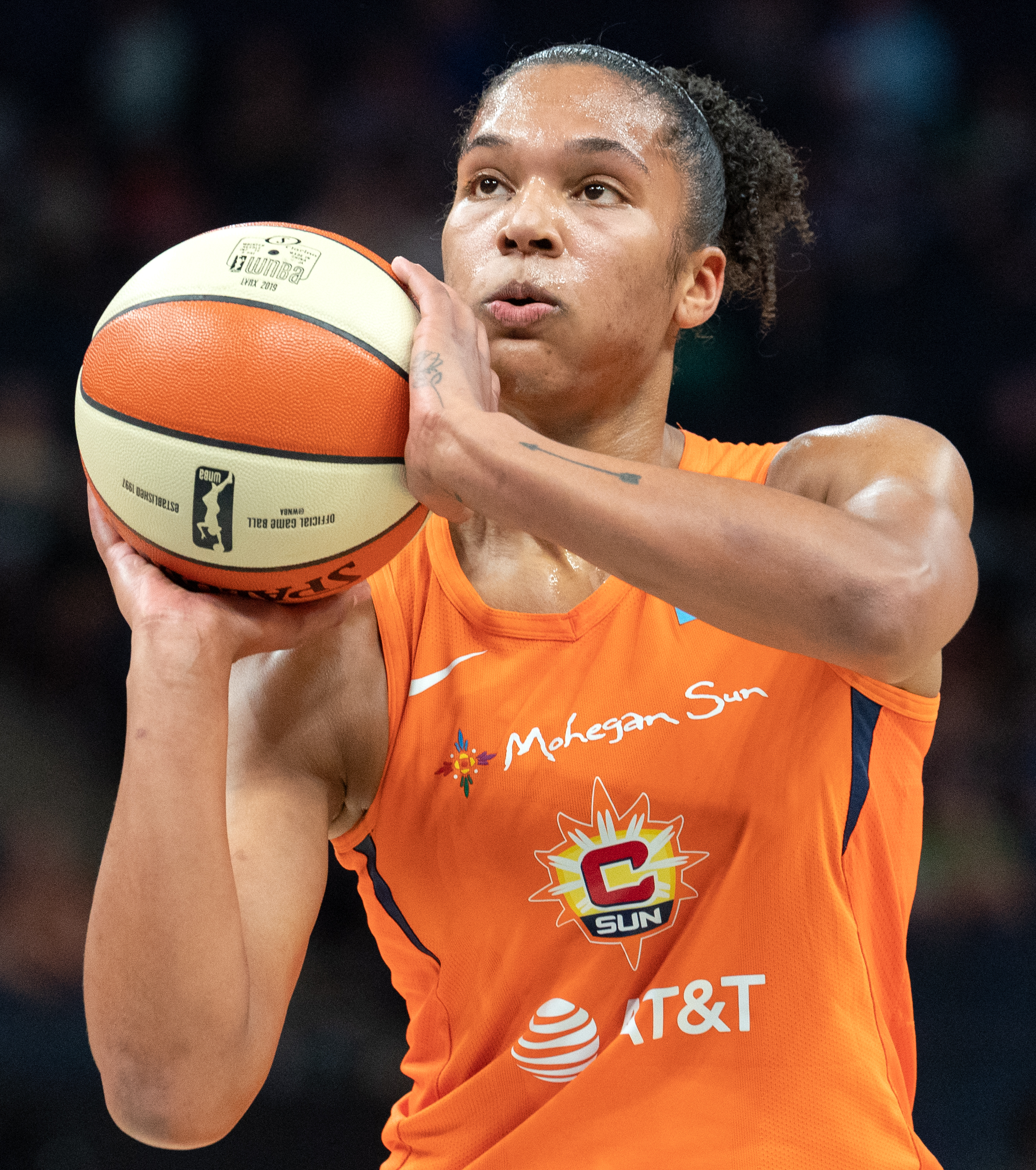
- Thomas in 2019

No. 25 – Phoenix Mercury
- Position: Power forward
- League: WNBA

Personal information
- Born: April 12, 1992 (age 34) Harrisburg, Pennsylvania, U.S.
- Listed height: 6 ft 2 in (1.88 m)
- Listed weight: 203 lb (92 kg)

Career information
- High school: Central Dauphin (Harrisburg, Pennsylvania)
- College: Maryland (2010–2014)
- WNBA draft: 2014: 1st round, 4th overall pick
- Drafted by: New York Liberty
- Playing career: 2014–present

Career history
- 2014–2024: Connecticut Sun
- 2014–2015: Bucheon KEB Hana Bank
- 2015–2016: Yakin Dogu
- 2016–2018: Yongin Samsung Blueminx
- 2018–2023: USK Praha
- 2023–2024: Shanxi Flame
- 2025–2026: Laces BC
- 2025–present: Phoenix Mercury

Career highlights
- 6× WNBA All-Star (2017, 2019, 2022–2025); 3× All-WNBA First Team (2023−2025); All-WNBA Second Team (2022); 3× WNBA All-Defensive First Team (2020, 2023, 2025); 4× WNBA All-Defensive Second Team (2017, 2019, 2022, 2024); 2× WNBA assists leader (2025, 2026); WNBA rebounding leader (2023); WNBA steals leader (2020); 3× WNBA Peak Performer (2023, 2025, 2026); No. 25 retired by Connecticut Sun; WNBA All-Rookie Team (2014); FIBA Women’s World Cup Best Defensive Player (2022); 2× EuroLeague Defensive Player of the Year (2023, 2020); 3× All-EuroLeague First Team (2020, 2022-2023); 5× Czech National League Champion (2018-2023); 3× All-American – WBCA (2012–2014); 3× All-American – USBWA (2012–2014); 2× First-team All-American – AP (2012, 2014); Second-team All-American – AP (2013); ACC Female Athlete of the Year (2014); 3× ACC Player of the Year (2012–2014); 3× First-team All-ACC (2012–2014); Second-team All-ACC (2011); ACC Tournament MVP (2012); ACC Rookie of the Year (2011); ACC All-Freshman Team (2011); No. 25 retired by Maryland Terrapins
- Stats at WNBA.com
- Stats at Basketball Reference
Medals
Women's basketball
Representing United States
Olympic Games
Gold medal – first place	2024 Paris	Team
World Cup
Gold medal – first place	2022 Australia
Women's 3x3 basketball
Representing United States
World Championship
Gold medal – first place	2012 Athens	Team

Alyssa Thomas (born April 12, 1992) is an American professional basketball forward for the Phoenix Mercury of the Women's National Basketball Association (WNBA) and for the Laces of Unrivaled. Nicknamed “AT” and “the Engine”, Thomas is known for her physical style of play and versatility on offense and defense. Thomas is a six-time WNBA All-Star, a four-time All-WNBA Team member, and a seven-time WNBA All-Defensive Team member. She is the WNBA’s all-time leader in triple-doubles. Thomas won a gold medal with the United States national team at the 2024 Summer Olympics.

Thomas played college basketball for the Maryland Terrapins. She was a three-time All-American and three-time ACC Player of the Year. Thomas led the University of Maryland to four NCAA Tournament appearances, three Sweet-Sixteens, two Elite-Eights, and, in her final season, the Final-Four. She is Maryland's all-time leader in points, rebounds, and double-doubles. Thomas was inducted into the University of Maryland Athletics Hall of Fame in 2024.

The New York Liberty drafted Thomas 4th overall in the 2014 WNBA draft, and immediately traded her to the Connecticut Sun along with Kelsey Bone and a 2015 first- round draft pick in exchange for Tina Charles. During 11 seasons with Connecticut, Thomas helped lead the Sun to two WNBA Finals and six consecutive playoff semifinals. She is the franchise’s all-time leader in games played, points, rebounds, assists, steals, and triple-doubles. She is widely regarded as the greatest player in Sun franchise history. In 2025, Connecticut traded Thomas to the Phoenix Mercury and she led them to the WNBA Finals that same year.

Thomas holds WNBA single-season records for triple-doubles, assists, and assisted points. She is also the league’s career playoff leader in assists, double-doubles, and triple-doubles, as well as its all-time leader in assists by a front-court player. Thomas is the only player in WNBA history to maintain career averages of at least 10 points, 7 rebounds, and 5 assists, and the only player to record at least 5,000 points, 3,000 rebounds, and 2,000 assists.

== Early life and family ==
Born in Camp Hill, Pennsylvania, Thomas is the eldest of three children (Note: Her younger sister is Alexia. Her younger brother Devin Thomas, a professional player in Europe, was Central Dauphin High School's career leading scorer known for shattering the backboard during an alley-oop dunk.) of Bob Thomas and Tina Klotzbeecher-Thomas. Her family all plays basketball and was highly competitive: Tina wouldn’t let her children win at Candy Land—everyone had to earn their wins. Dentistry fascinated Alyssa, who said she could have been a dentist if she had not become a professional athlete. (Note: She carried her interest in meticulous cleaning into adulthood by detailing her Mercedes-Benz.) She was a good soccer player as a child, but her mother signed her up for basketball at age five despite her wishes. Her parents met in college at Millersville University where they both played basketball. Beginning in grade school, Tina taught Alyssa to play every position because there was no way to know what position she would play when she was older. She coached Alyssa through the Amateur Athletic Union from grade school through high school.

Thomas attended Central Dauphin High School where she was the all-time leading scorer. In 2010 she was Parade Magazine All-America first team, USA Today All-USA third team, and Associated Press Pennsylvania Class 4A Player of the Year. She considered attending Notre Dame, Penn State, Miami and North Carolina State, but chose the University of Maryland.

== College career ==
In her freshman season, Thomas was named 2011 ACC Rookie of the Year and was selected to the All-ACC Second Team. She was among her team's leading scorers, averaging 14.5 points per game, as well as 7.3 rebounds and 2.1 steals per game.

Thomas came to national attention in her sophomore season (2011-2012). After leading the ACC in scoring at 17.2 points per game, she was named the 2012 ACC Player of the Year and an AP, WBCA and USBWA First Team All-American. She led the Maryland Terrapins to the 2012 ACC Championship, scoring 29 points in the championship game against Georgia Tech and earning ACC Tournament MVP honors. The Terrapins went on to the Elite Eight of the NCAA Tournament, falling to Notre Dame in their final game of the 2011–2012 season.

In her junior year, Thomas became the first person in NCAA or WNBA history to average over 18 points, 10 rebounds and 5 assists for an entire season. She won ACC Player of the Year for a second time and led the injury-addled Terrapins to the Sweet Sixteen in the NCAA Tournament.

Thomas capped her collegiate career by earning 2014 ACC Player of the Year for a third straight season, in addition to AP, WBCA and USBWA First-Team All America honors. She led a young Terrapins squad on a deep run through the NCAA Tournament, scoring a career-high 33 points against the Tennessee Lady Vols in the Sweet Sixteen en route to reaching the 2014 Final Four in Nashville. The Terrapins were defeated by Notre Dame in the Final Four match-up. On June 27, 2014, Thomas was named ACC Female Athlete of the Year.

The University of Maryland honored Thomas's jersey in a ceremony on March 2, 2014.

== Professional career ==
=== WNBA ===
==== Connecticut Sun (2014–2024) ====
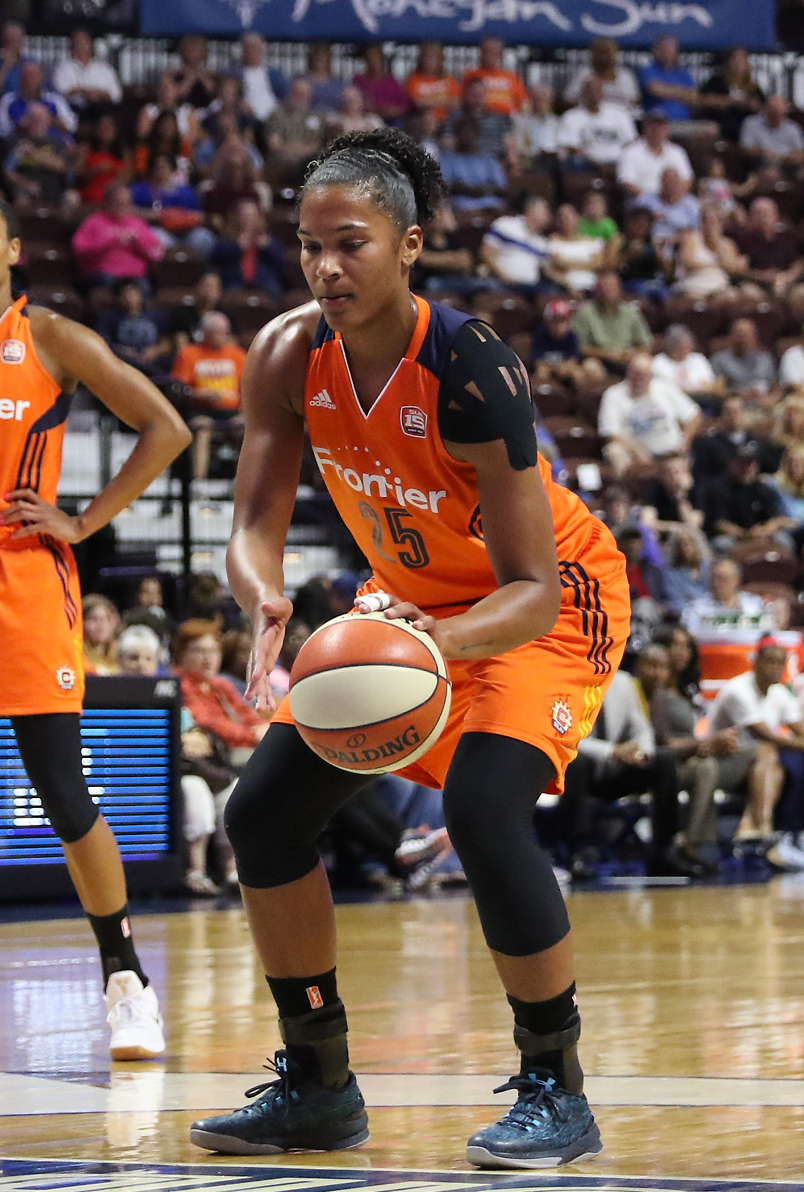
Thomas in 2017

Thomas was drafted 4th overall by the New York Liberty in the 2014 WNBA draft, and was draft-day traded to the Connecticut Sun alongside Kelsey Bone. In her rookie season, she averaged 10.0 points and 5.1 rebounds with the Sun in 34 games with 28 starts. She was named to the 2014 WNBA All-Rookie Team.

After her rookie season, Thomas would continue her role as starting power forward for the Sun. In 2017, Thomas would emerge as an all-star in the league. She scored a career-high 26 points in an 86–76 win over the Washington Mystics. She would then be voted into the 2017 WNBA All-Star Game, making it her first career all-star game appearance. Thomas would finish off the season setting new career-highs in scoring, rebounding, assists and steals as the Sun made the playoffs as the number 4 seed with a 21–13 record, receiving a bye to the second round, making it their first playoff appearance since 2012. In her first career playoff game, Thomas scored 20 points and grabbed 10 rebounds in an 88–83 loss to the Phoenix Mercury.

In February 2018, Thomas re-signed with the Sun to a multi-year deal in free agency. On August 9, 2018, Thomas scored a season-high 22 points in a 101–92 victory over the Dallas Wings to help the Sun clinch a playoff spot. The Sun finished 21–13 with the number 4 seed and a bye to the second round. The Sun would yet again lose to the Phoenix Mercury in the second round elimination game by a final score of 96–86.

==== Phoenix Mercury (2025–present) ====
On February 2, 2025, Thomas was traded to the Phoenix Mercury. The deal was originally reported as Thomas and Tyasha Harris being traded in exchange for Natasha Cloud, Rebecca Allen, and the 12th pick in the 2025 WNBA draft; however, it was officially part of a larger four-team trade.

On August 7, 2025, in a game against the Indiana Fever, Thomas had 18 points, 11 rebounds and 10 assists, to record her third consecutive triple-double, a WNBA record. As of that date she was the WNBA's career leader in triple-doubles, with 19. No other WNBA player has had more than four.

On June 25, 2026, Thomas received a flagrant foul penalty 2 and was suspended for one game after hitting and thrown a punch towards Indiana Fever guard Caitlin Clark in the throat during a game.

=== Overseas ===
In 2014–2015, Thomas played in South Korea for Bucheon KEB Hana Bank. She led the league in scoring and rebounding, averaging 19 points and 11.1 rebounds per game. In 2015–2016, Thomas signed in Turkey for Yakin Dogu. In the 2016-17 offseason, Thomas signed with Yongin Samsung Blueminx of the Korean League. In 2017, Thomas resigned with Yongin Samsung Blueminx for the 2017-18 off-season. In 2018, Thomas signed with USK Praha of the Czech League for the 2018-19 off-season.

On April 15, 2023, Thomas was named the Defensive Player of the Year of the 2022–23 EuroLeague Women season.

=== Unrivaled ===
On November 12, 2024, it was announced that Thomas would appear and play in the inaugural 2025 season of Unrivaled, the women's 3-on-3 basketball league founded by Napheesa Collier and Breanna Stewart. She plays for the Laces.

== National team career ==
=== 2024 Summer Olympics ===
In June 2024, Thomas was named to the US women's Olympic team to compete at the 2024 Summer Olympics in France. Thomas and the United States defeated France 67–66 in the final, earning Thomas her first Olympic gold medal and the United States' eighth consecutive gold medal.

== Player profile ==
=== Shooting style ===
Thomas is left-handed and learned ambidexterity while growing up. She has a torn labrum in each shoulder. Michael Rosenberg of Sports Illustrated described her one-handed shooting style as, "a shooting motion that looks like a waiter carrying a tray, then throwing it in the air and quitting."

During Game 2 of the 2020 semifinals against the Las Vegas Aces, Thomas dislocated her right shoulder. She returned to play in Game 3, scoring 23 points and 12 rebounds.

== Career statistics ==
Legend
GP	Games played	GS	Games started	MPG	Minutes per game	RPG	Rebounds per game
APG	Assists per game	SPG	Steals per game	BPG	Blocks per game	PPG	Points per game
TO	Turnovers per game	FG%	Field-goal percentage	3P%	3-point field-goal percentage	FT%	Free-throw percentage
**Bold**	Career best	°	League leader

=== WNBA ===
==== Regular season ====
WNBA regular season statistics
Year	Team	GP	GS	MPG	FG%	3P%	FT%	RPG	APG	SPG	BPG	TO	PPG
2014	Connecticut	34	28	27.3	.436	**.333**	**.757**	5.1	1.5	1.0	0.2	1.7	10.1
2015	Connecticut	24	23	26.0	.411	.000	.692	5.3	1.4	1.2	0.2	1.8	8.8
2016	Connecticut	31	31	27.1	.487	.000	.634	6.0	2.3	1.4	0.2	2.4	11.1
2017	Connecticut	33	33	29.8	.509	.000	.567	6.8	4.5	1.5	0.4	2.9	14.8
2018	Connecticut	24	24	30.6	.464	.000	.547	8.1	4.2	1.2	0.4	2.0	10.3
2019	Connecticut	34	34	30.2	.505	.000	.496	7.8	3.1	1.9	0.4	2.0	11.6
2020	Connecticut	21	21	32.8	.500	.000	.686	9.0	4.8	**2.0**	0.3	2.5	**15.5**
2021	Connecticut	3	0	12.3	.267	.000	.750	3.3	1.3	0.3	0.0	**1.0**	3.7
2022	Connecticut	36	36	32.1	.500	.000	.730	8.2	6.1	1.7	0.2	2.9	13.4
2023	Connecticut	40	40	**36.2**	.474	.000	.715	**9.9**	7.9	1.8	**0.5**	3.4	**15.5**
2024	Connecticut	40	40	32.4	.509	.000	.628	8.4	7.9	1.6	**0.5**	3.6	10.6
2025	Phoenix	39	39	31.3	**.532**	.000	.692	8.8	**9.2**°	1.6	0.4	3.5	15.4
2026	Phoenix	**42**	**42**	33.2	.521	**.333**	.687	7.8	8.5°	1.3	0.5	3.5	14.3
**Career**	13 years, 2 teams	401	391	30.8	.493	.100	.655	7.6	5.4	1.5	0.3	2.7	12.7
**Career**	All-Star	6	1	14.4	.875	—	—	4.0	2.3	0.3	0.2	1.0	4.7

==== Playoffs ====
WNBA playoff statistics
Year	Team	GP	GS	MPG	FG%	3P%	FT%	RPG	APG	SPG	BPG	TO	PPG
2017	Connecticut	1	1	32.0	**.667**	.000	.667	**10.0**	1.0	2.0	0.0	6.0	**20.0**
2018	Connecticut	1	1	35.0	.538	.000	**1.000**	3.0	3.0	0.0	0.0	**1.0**	17.0
2019	Connecticut	8	8	37.0	.532	.000	.778	9.3	6.6	**2.4**°	0.1	2.1	16.0
2020	Connecticut	7	7	32.4	.515	.000	.767	8.1	4.0	1.7	0.4	2.1	17.9
2021	Connecticut	4	0	23.3	.408	.000	.636	6.0	3.8	1.5	0.5	1.3	11.8
2022	Connecticut	**12**	**12**	33.5	.474	.000	.576	9.5	6.3	1.5	**0.7**	2.5	12.3
2023	Connecticut	7	7	**38.9**	.500	.000	.630	8.0	**10.3**°	1.7	0.3	2.7	18.1
2024	Connecticut	7	7	38.7	.495	.000	.778	7.9	9.4	1.0	0.0	2.6	14.9
2025	Phoenix	11	11	36.7	.500	.000	.651	9.0	8.8	1.7	0.4	4.1	16.9
**Career**	9 years, 2 teams	58	54	35.0	.498	.000	.694	8.5	7.1	1.6	0.3	2.7	15.6

=== College ===
NCAA statistics
Year	Team	GP	GS	MPG	FG%	3P%	FT%	RPG	APG	SPG	BPG	TO	PPG
2010-11	Maryland	31	31	27.1	.480	—	.730	7.3	1.6	2.1	0.2	2.6	14.5
2011-12	Maryland	35	**35**	31.9	.462	.259	**.800**	8.0	3.2	1.6	0.4	**2.4**	17.2
2012-13	Maryland	34	34	34.2	.452	**.429**	.765	10.3	**5.3**	**1.8**	**0.8**	4.0	18.8
2013-14	Maryland	**35**	34	30.9	**.513**	.240	.797	**10.9**	4.1	1.5	0.4	2.5	**19.0**
**Career**		135	134	31.1	.476	.268	.774	9.1	3.6	1.8	0.4	2.9	17.5

== Personal life ==
Thomas is the older sister of former Wake Forest player, Devin Thomas.

In February 2021, she and then Connecticut Sun teammate, DeWanna Bonner, shared that they were in a relationship, and in July 2023 they became engaged. The two became teammates again when Bonner signed with the Mercury in July 2025.

== See also ==
- List of NCAA Division I basketball career triple-doubles leaders
