= Reshea Bristol =

American basketball player

Personal information
- Born: February 10, 1978 (age 48)
- Listed height: 178 cm (5 ft 10 in)

Career information
- High school: Omaha Bryan (Bellevue, Nebraska)
- College: Arizona (1996–2001)
- WNBA draft: 2001: 4th round, 50th overall pick
- Drafted by: Charlotte Sting
- Playing career: 2001–2017
- Position: Guard / forward
- Number: 10
- Coaching career: 2012–present

Career history

Playing
- 2001: Charlotte Sting
- 2001–2002: Dynamo
- 2003-2004: Telekomas
- 2004–2005: Keflavík
- 2006-2007: Pully
- 2007–2009: B. Burhaniye Belediye
- 2009–2010: VSPrague
- 2011: Pabellon Ourense
- 2014-2017: Nebraska Strikers

Coaching
- 2018–present: Nebraska Christian (assistant)

Career highlights
- Úrvalsdeild Foreign Player of the Year (2005); Icelandic champion (2005); Icelandic Company Cup (2004); Icelandic Super Cup (2005); 2× Úrvalsdeild assist leader (2005, 2006); 2× Úrvalsdeild steals leader (2005, 2006); Turkish All-Star (2008); All Pac-10 (2001)
- Stats at Basketball Reference

Reshea LaNette Bristol (born February 10, 1978) is an American former professional basketball player. After starting her career in the WNBA with the Charlotte Sting in 2001, she went on to play fourteen years in Russia, Lithuania, Iceland, Switzerland, Turkey, the Czech Republic, Spain, and Stateside.

== College career ==
Bristol played college basketball for the University of Arizona from 1996 to 2001. She finished her Arizona career in the No. 5 spot on the UA all-time scoring list, with 1,260 points.

== Professional career ==
Bristol was drafted by the Charlotte Sting with the 50th pick in the 2001 WNBA draft. She played for Dynamo in Moscow during the 2001-02 season.

In 2004, she signed with Keflavík of the Icelandic Úrvalsdeild. On 27 November 2004, she helped Keflavík win the Icelandic Company Cup after defeating ÍS in the Cup finals. In January 2005, she left the team due to a family emergency and missed the rest of the season. Despite an early exit, Bristol lead the league in assists, steals and three point percent and was named the Úrvalsdeild Foreign Player of the Year at the end of the season. She returned to Keflavík for the 2005–2006 season. In October 2005, she helped Keflavík win the annual Icelandic Super Cup after posting 14 points and 13 steals in a victory against Haukar. On 30 October 2005, Keflavík lost its first game with Bristol as a player. It had previously won all 22 games she had played in since 2004. In December 2005, Bristol left the club. Despite another early exit, she again led the league in assists and steals.

After spending the 2009-10 season with VS Prague in the Czech Women's Basketball League, she signed with Pabellon Ourense of the Spanish Liga Femenina 2 in January 2011. In 15 games, she averaged 10.5 points and 6.3 rebounds.

== Career statistics ==
Legend
GP	Games played	GS	Games started	MPG	Minutes per game	RPG	Rebounds per game
APG	Assists per game	SPG	Steals per game	BPG	Blocks per game	PPG	Points per game
TO	Turnovers per game	FG%	Field-goal percentage	3P%	3-point field-goal percentage	FT%	Free-throw percentage
**Bold**	Career best	°	League leader

=== WNBA ===
WNBA regular season statistics
Year	Team	GP	GS	MPG	FG%	3P%	FT%	RPG	APG	SPG	BPG	TO	PPG
2001	Charlotte	1	0	5.0	0.0	—	—	2.0	0.0	0.0	0.0	1.0	0.0
**Career**	1 year, 1 team	1	0	5.0	0.0	—	—	2.0	0.0	0.0	0.0	1.0	0.0

=== College ===
NCAA statistics
Year	Team	GP	Points	FG%	3P%	FT%	RPG	APG	SPG	BPG	PPG
1998–99	Arizona	28	311	37.5%	21.7%	70.7%	4.4	3.3	2.7	0.2	11.1
1999–00	Arizona	28	240	38.4%	30.2%	**78.1%**	3.6	3.1	2.0	0.1	8.6
2000–01	Arizona	**32**	**498**	**41.2%**	**34.0%**	71.6%	**4.8**	**7.6**	**3.0**	**0.4**	**15.6**
**Career**		88	1049	39.5%	30.9%	72.7%	4.3	4.8	2.6	0.3	11.9
