= Elizabeth Kitley =

American basketball player (born 2001)

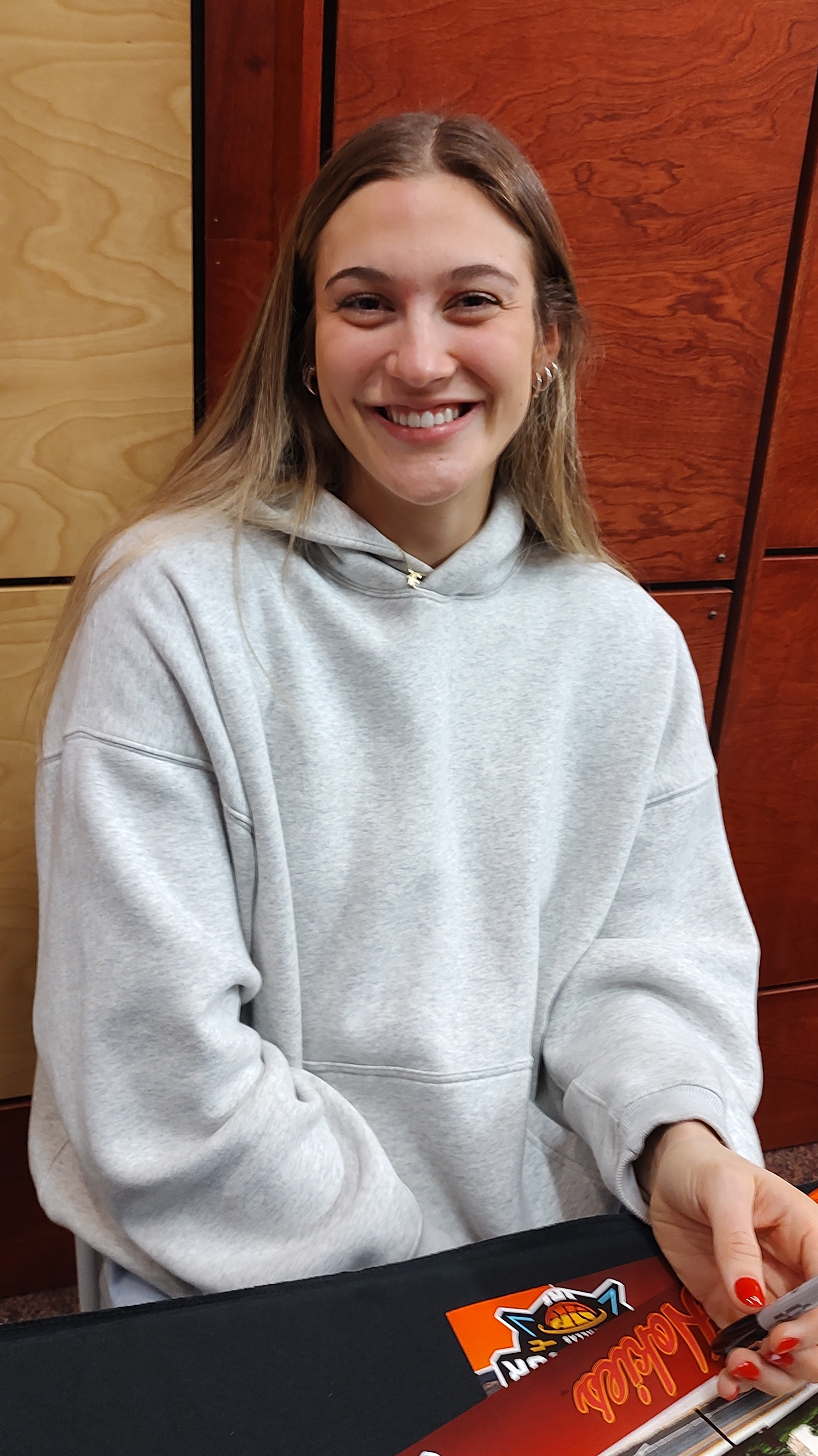
- Kitley in 2024

Free agent
- Position: Center

Personal information
- Born: September 17, 2001 (age 25) Summerfield, North Carolina, U.S.
- Listed height: 6 ft 6 in (1.98 m)
- Listed weight: 195 lb (88 kg)

Career information
- High school: Northwest Guilford (Greensboro, North Carolina)
- College: Virginia Tech (2019–2024)
- WNBA draft: 2024: 2nd round, 24th overall pick
- Drafted by: Las Vegas Aces
- Playing career: 2024–present

Career history
- 2025: Las Vegas Aces

Career highlights
- Second-team All-American – AP, USBWA (2023, 2024); Third-team All-American – AP, USBWA (2022); 3× WBCA Coaches' All-American (2022-2024); 3× ACC Player of the Year (2022–2024); 4× First-team All-ACC (2021–2024); 3× ACC All-Defensive Team (2022–2024); ACC Rookie of the Year (2020); ACC All-Freshman Team (2020); No. 33 retired by Virginia Tech Hokies
- Stats at Basketball Reference

Elizabeth Ann Kitley (born September 17, 2001) is an American professional basketball player who is currently a free agent. She played college basketball at Virginia Tech. She was drafted 24th overall in the 2024 WNBA draft by the Las Vegas Aces.

== Early life ==
Kitley grew up playing basketball, softball and volleyball, preferring softball by fifth grade. She switched her focus to basketball before her freshman year at Northwest Guilford High School in Greensboro, North Carolina, when she stood 6 ft 2 in (1.88 m). As a sophomore, Kitley led Northwest Guilford to its first state championship at the 4A tournament and was named most valuable player (MVP) of the title game. She helped her team win another state title in her junior season, repeating as MVP of the title game. Before her senior season, Kitley suffered a torn anterior cruciate ligament during an Amateur Athletic Union game. Following surgery, she was sidelined until the final two games of the season. Rated a five-star recruit by ESPN, she committed to play for Virginia Tech at the college level under head coach Kenny Brooks.

== College career ==
On November 5, 2019, Kitley made her collegiate debut and scored a season-high 27 points, shooting 13-of-15 from the field, in a 105–41 win over Saint Francis (PA). She recorded the most points by a Virginia Tech freshman in a debut. As a freshman, Kitley averaged 12.5 points, 7.5 rebounds and 2.1 blocks per game and was named Atlantic Coast Conference (ACC) Freshman of the Year. On December 4, 2020, she posted a sophomore season-high 30 points and 11 rebounds in an 84–59 win against Appalachian State. On January 17, 2021, Kitley tied the program single-game record with 21 rebounds, while scoring 18 points in a 67–64 loss to Wake Forest. One week later, she scored 30 points for a second time, along with 13 rebounds, in an 89–87 loss to AP No. 2 NC State. Kitley averaged 18.2 points and 10.4 rebounds per game as a sophomore, earning first-team All-ACC honors.

On November 11, 2021, Kitley tallied 34 points and nine rebounds, making a program-record 17 field goals, in a 75–38 win over George Washington. On December 19, she posted 34 points and 13 rebounds in a 92–75 win against Florida State. Kitley sustained a right shoulder injury against North Carolina in the quarterfinals of the 2022 ACC tournament and was sidelined as her team lost to NC State in the following game. She returned for the first round of the NCAA tournament. During the game, Kitley set the Virginia Tech single-game scoring record with 42 points in an 84–81 loss to 12th-seeded Florida Gulf Coast. As a junior, she averaged 18.1 points, 9.8 rebounds and 2.4 blocks per game. Kitley was named ACC Player of the Year and repeated as a first-team All-ACC selection. She received third-team All-American recognition from the AP and United States Basketball Writers Association (USBWA) and was a member of the Women's Basketball Coaches Association (WBCA) All-America team.

On February 23, 2023, Kitley set the Virginia Tech career scoring record, while posting 21 points and 10 rebounds and making the game-winning shot at the buzzer, in a 61–59 win over North Carolina. Three days later, she had a senior season-high 29 points and 11 rebounds in a 65–52 victory over Georgia Tech. At the 2023 NCAA tournament, Kitley led Virginia Tech to its first Final Four. As a senior, she averaged 18.2 points, 10.7 rebounds and 2.4 blocks per game, becoming Virginia Tech's all-time leader in points, field goals, blocks and double-doubles. Kitley repeated as ACC Player of the Year, made the WBCA All-America team and was named a second-team All-American by the AP and USBWA.

Despite being a projected first-round pick in the 2023 WNBA draft, she returned for a fifth season of eligibility, granted due to the COVID-19 pandemic. After the spring 2023 semester, Kitley completed her Bachelor of Science in human nutrition with concentrations in foods and exercise and summa cum laude honors.

On December 21, 2023, Kitley became the ACC all-time leader in rebounds, recording 23 points and 17 rebounds in a 76–43 win over William & Mary. On January 7, 2024, she made a game-winning layup while posting 27 points and 12 rebounds in a 63–62 win over AP No. 3 NC State. On March 3, 2024, in the regular season finale against the University of Virginia, Kitley suffered an ACL injury in her left leg that would sideline her indefinitely, ending her collegiate basketball career. She would be named ACC Player of the Year the same season, becoming only the fifth in the award's history to earn the honor three separate occasions. Kitley finished her career at Virginia Tech with all-time program records in games started, minutes played, points scored, field-goal percentage, field goals made, double-doubles, rebounds, and blocks.

On April 13, 2024, immediately following Kitley's final season as a student-athlete, Virginia Tech Athletics announced that her jersey number would be formally retired. The ceremony took place on January 19, 2025, at Cassell Coliseum, the Hokies home venue. Kitley's jersey number is the first and only to be retired by the Hokies women's basketball program in the 21st century.

== Professional career ==
On April 15, 2024, the Las Vegas Aces selected Kitley with the 24th overall pick in the 2024 WNBA draft. Due to her ACL injury, the Aces suspended her contract and reserved her rights, but she was allowed to utilize their facilities in her recovery.

On February 3, 2025, Kitley signed her rookie contract with the Aces. On June 30, she was waived by the Aces.

The Golden State Valkyries signed Kitley to a seven-day hardship contract on September 3, 2025. The Valkyries waived her a few days later on September 8. Officially, she was part of the team for two games but did not play in either.

== Career statistics ==
Legend
GP	Games played	GS	Games started	MPG	Minutes per game	RPG	Rebounds per game
APG	Assists per game	SPG	Steals per game	BPG	Blocks per game	PPG	Points per game
TO	Turnovers per game	FG%	Field-goal percentage	3P%	3-point field-goal percentage	FT%	Free-throw percentage
**Bold**	Career best	°	League leader

=== WNBA ===
Stats current through 2025 season

WNBA regular season statistics
Year	Team	GP	GS	MPG	FG%	3P%	FT%	RPG	APG	SPG	BPG	TO	PPG
2025	Las Vegas	12	1	8.2	.304	.000	.500	1.4	0.1	0.3	0.5	0.6	1.3
**Career**	1 year, 1 team	12	1	8.2	.304	.000	.500	1.4	0.1	0.3	0.5	0.6	1.3

=== College ===
NCAA statistics
Year	Team	GP	GS	MPG	FG%	3P%	FT%	RPG	APG	SPG	BPG	TO	PPG
2019–20	Virginia Tech	30	30	26.8	**56.2**	20.0	66.7	7.5	0.7	0.2	2.1	2.2	12.5
2020–21	Virginia Tech	25	25	**35.6**	53.1	**42.9**	**78.0**	10.4	**2.0**	0.5	1.9	2.8	18.2
2021–22	Virginia Tech	32	32	32.0	55.1	16.7	72.4	9.8	1.5	0.5	**2.4**	**2.0**	18.1
2022–23	Virginia Tech	**35**	**35**	34.8	55.8	20.0	72.2	10.7	1.5	**0.6**	**2.4**	2.2	18.2
2023–24	Virginia Tech	29	29	34.3	55.6	40.0	77.4	**11.4**	1.8	**0.6**	2.1	2.1	**22.8**°
**Career**		151	151	32.6	55.2	28.6	73.5	10.0	1.5	0.5	2.2	2.2	17.9

== Personal life ==
Kitley's father, Ralph, played professional basketball in Germany and Brazil, following a college career at Wake Forest. He later became a high school principal, teacher and basketball coach.
