= Tiffany Travis =

American basketball player

Personal information
- Born: March 20, 1978 (age 48) Picayune, Mississippi, U.S.
- Listed height: 5 ft 11 in (1.80 m)
- Listed weight: 145 lb (66 kg)

Career information
- High school: Harrison Central (Gulfport, Mississippi)
- College: Florida (1996–2000)
- WNBA draft: 2000: 2nd round, 11th overall pick
- Drafted by: Charlotte Sting
- Playing career: 2000–2000
- Position: Guard / forward
- Number: 10

Career history
- 2000: Charlotte Sting

Career highlights
- Second-team All-SEC (2000); Mississippi Miss Basketball (1996)
- Stats at Basketball Reference

Tiffany Travis (born March 20, 1978) is an American former professional basketball player in the Women's National Basketball Association (WNBA).

Travis was born in Picayune, Mississippi. She attended Harrison Central High School in Gulfport, Mississippi, where she played high school basketball for the Harrison Central Red Rebels. She graduated from Harrison Central in 1996.

She accepted an athletic scholarship to attend the University of Florida, and Travis excelled for coach Carol Ross's Florida Gators women's basketball team from 1996 to 2000. Travis was a second-team All-Southeastern Conference (SEC) selection as a senior in 2000. She graduated from the University of Florida with a bachelor's degree in 2000.

Travis was selected in the second round, 11th pick overall, of the 2000 WNBA draft by the Charlotte Sting. She played in all 32 games, starting 12 of them, as a rookie. She scored 10 or more points on four occasions, including a career-high of 16. Among her 2000 Sting teammates, she scored the fifth-highest point total (173), and was sixth in points per game (5.4). Her 81 rebounds were the fifth-most on the team. Her 31 steals were the third-highest on the Sting, and seventh-highest among 2000 WNBA rookies. She led the Sting in three-point field goal percentage (48.0%), and was fourth in three-point field goals made (12) and attempted (25).

Her WNBA career ended as a result of a 2001 knee injury.

== Career statistics ==
Legend
GP	Games played	GS	Games started	MPG	Minutes per game	RPG	Rebounds per game
APG	Assists per game	SPG	Steals per game	BPG	Blocks per game	PPG	Points per game
TO	Turnovers per game	FG%	Field-goal percentage	3P%	3-point field-goal percentage	FT%	Free-throw percentage
**Bold**	Career best	°	League leader

=== WNBA ===
==== Regular season ====
Year	Team	GP	GS	MPG	FG%	3P%	FT%	RPG	APG	SPG	BPG	TO	PPG
2000	Charlotte	32	12	17.9	44.3	48.0	75.0	2.5	0.8	1.0	0.1	1.0	5.4
Career	1 year, 1 team	32	12	17.9	44.3	48.0	75.0	2.5	0.8	1.0	0.1	1.0	5.4

=== College ===
Legend
GP	Games played	GS	Games started	MPG	Minutes per game
FG%	Field goal percentage	3P%	3-point field goal percentage	FT%	Free throw percentage
RPG	Rebounds per game	APG	Assists per game	SPG	Steals per game
BPG	Blocks per game	PPG	Points per game	**Bold**	Career high

Year	Team	GP	Points	FG%	3P%	FT%	RPG	APG	SPG	BPG	PPG
1996-97	Florida	33	234	44.6%	0.0%	74.3%	2.6	0.6	0.6	0.2	7.1
1997-98	Florida	16	229	**52.1%**	33.3%	69.2%	**5.9**	1.1	1.4	**0.9**	14.3
1998-99	Florida	32	465	46.1%	**40.0%**	**85.2%**	4.2	0.9	1.1	0.5	14.5
1999-00	Florida	**34**	560	43.3%	35.2%	71.2%	4.3	**1.3**	**1.6**	0.5	**16.5**
TOTALS	Florida	115	1488	45.6%	34.2%	74.5%	4.0	1.0	1.2	0.1	12.9

== See also ==
- List of Florida Gators in the WNBA
- List of University of Florida alumni
