= Charlotte Smith (basketball) =

American basketball player and coach (born 1973)

Elon Phoenix
- Title: Head coach
- League: Colonial Athletic Association

Personal information
- Born: August 23, 1973 (age 53) Shelby, North Carolina, U.S.
- Listed height: 6 ft 0 in (1.83 m)
- Listed weight: 148 lb (67 kg)

Career information
- High school: Shelby (Shelby, North Carolina)
- College: North Carolina (1991–1995)
- WNBA draft: 1999: 3rd round, 33rd overall pick
- Drafted by: Charlotte Sting
- Playing career: 1996–2006
- Position: Forward
- Coaching career: 2002–present

Career history

Playing
- 1996–1997: Colorado Xplosion
- 1997–1998: San Jose Lasers
- 1999–2004: Charlotte Sting
- 2005: Washington Mystics
- 2006: Indiana Fever

Career highlights
- As player: ABL All-Star (1998); First-team All-American – AP (1995); Kodak All-American (1995); All-American – USBWA (1995); NCAA champion (1994); NCAA final Four MOP (1994); 2× First-team All-ACC (1994, 1995); 2× ACC tournament MVP (1994, 1995); ACCRookie of the Year (1992); ACC All-Freshman team (1992); As coach: CAA Coach of the Year (2017)
- Stats at Basketball Reference
Medals
Women's basketball
Representing United States
World University Games
| Silver medal – second place | 1995 Fukuoka, Japan | Team competition |
Jones Cup
| Gold medal – first place | 1996 Taipei, Taiwan | Team Competition |
FIBA Under-18 Americas Championship
| Silver medal – second place | 1992 Mexico | Team |

Charlotte Smith (born August 23, 1973) is a retired American professional women's basketball player for the Charlotte Sting, Washington Mystics and Indiana Fever in the WNBA, and for the Colorado Xplosion and San Jose Lasers in the ABL. She is currently the women's basketball head coach at Elon University.

== Playing career ==
After excelling as a basketball player at Shelby High School in Shelby, North Carolina, Smith played college basketball for the North Carolina Tar Heels. As a freshman, she was selected as women's basketball Rookie of the Year for the Atlantic Coast Conference. She was named Most Outstanding Player of the NCAA Women's Division I Basketball Championship in 1994 when she hit the championship-winning shot for the Tar Heels at the buzzer. In the same game, Smith tied an NCAA Tournament record with 23 rebounds.

Smith was named National College Player of the Year by ESPN in 1995, was named a first-team collegiate All-American by Kodak/WBCA and the Associated Press, and is one of only two North Carolina women's basketball players to have had her jersey retired. She was named most valuable player of the ACC Tournament in her junior and senior years. She also became the second female college basketball player ever to dunk during a game on December 4, 1994. In 2002, Smith was named to the ACC's 50th Anniversary Team.

After her collegiate eligibility ended in 1995, Smith joined a professional basketball club in Italy. She was named Most Valuable Player of the Italian league's All-Star game for the 1995-1996 season.

In 1996, Smith was selected by the Colorado Xplosion in the third round of the initial draft held by the newly formed ABL. She played one season with Colorado, then was traded to the San Jose Lasers. As a Laser, she was named to the ABL All-Star team for the 1997–1998 season.

Following the ABL's cessation of operations in 1999, Smith participated in the 1999 WNBA Draft, where the Charlotte Sting chose her with the 33rd overall pick. She played six seasons with the Sting. During the offseason, she interned with the Sting's front office, worked with US Sport Management, Inc., played a second winter season in Italy in 1999–2000, and served as an UNC women's basketball assistant coach for several seasons. Smith also earned a bachelor's degree in sociology from UNC in 1999.

Smith joined the WNBA's Washington Mystics for the 2005 season. She was briefly affiliated with the Indiana Fever at the start of the 2006 season.

=== North Carolina statistics ===
Legend
| GP | Games played | GS | Games started | MPG | Minutes per game | RPG | Rebounds per game |
| APG | Assists per game | SPG | Steals per game | BPG | Blocks per game | PPG | Points per game |
| TO | Turnovers per game | FG% | Field-goal percentage | 3P% | 3-point field-goal percentage | FT% | Free-throw percentage |
| **Bold** | Career best | ° | League leader |

| Year | Team | GP | Points | FG% | 3P% | FT% | RPG | APG | SPG | BPG | PPG |
|---|---|---|---|---|---|---|---|---|---|---|---|
| 1991–92 | North Carolina | 31 | 450 | 48.6% | 10.0% | 63.9% | 8.1 | 0.7 | 1.1 | 0.4 | 14.5 |
| 1992–93 | North Carolina | 30 | 446 | 45.6% | **28.6%** | 61.1% | 9.0 | 2.1 | **1.9** | 0.7 | 14.9 |
| 1993–94 | North Carolina | 33 | 513 | 50.3% | 28.1% | **70.4%** | 9.2 | 2.2 | 1.4 | 0.6 | 15.5 |
| 1994–95 | North Carolina | **35** | **685** | **53.3%** | 28.3% | 65.2% | **10.7** | **2.9** | 1.8 | **0.7** | **19.6**° |
| Career | North Carolina | 129 | 2094 | 49.7% | 26.6% | 65.2% | 9.3 | 2.0 | 1.5 | 0.6 | 16.2 |

== USA Basketball ==
Smith was named to the USA U18 team (then called the Junior World Championship Qualifying Team) in 1992. The team competed in Guanajuato, Mexico in August 1992. The team won their first four games, then lost 80–70 to Brazil, finishing with the silver medal for the event, but qualifying for the 1993 world games. Smith averaged 5.2 points per game during the event.

Smith represented the US at the 1995 World University Games held in Fukuoka, Japan in August and September 1995. The team had a record of 5–1, securing the silver medal. The USA team won early and reached a record of 5–0 when the USA beat Yugoslavia. In the semi-final game, the USA faced Russia. The team was behind much of the first half but managed to tie the game at the half. The USA broke the game open in the second half and won 101–74, with Smith recording a double-double with 14 points, 14 rebounds along with seven assists. The gold medal match was against unbeaten Italy. The Italian team started strong, scoring 12 of the first 14 points of the contest. Sylvia Crawley scored eight consecutive points to end the first half, but that left the USA nine points behind. The USA took a small lead in the second half, but the team from Italy responded with a ten-point run, and won the game and the gold medal by a score of 73–65. Smith was the third leading scorer for the team with 13.7 points per game, and led the team in rebounds with 7.9 per game.

Smith was invited to be a member of the Jones Cup team representing the US in 1996. She helped the team to a 9–0 record, and the gold medal in the event. Smith averaged 9.7 points per game, the highest scoring average on the team, and was named the All-Tournament MVP.

== Coaching career ==
In 2002, Smith joined the North Carolina Tar Heels women's basketball coaching staff as an assistant coach. Smith would help lead the Tar Heels to four straight number one seeds in the NCAA Women's Division I Basketball Championship from 2005 to 2008. Her teams were ACC regular season champions in 2005, 2006 and 2008 and claimed the ACC Tournament title in 2005, 2006, 2007 and 2008. Smith was a part of two Final Four teams while on the North Carolina staff.

On June 22, 2011, Smith was named the head women's basketball coach at Elon University, becoming the sixth head coach in program history. In her first season leading the Phoenix, she set a new school record for wins by a first-year head coach. Charlotte Smith was named the 2017 CAA Coach of the Year and Elon won its first CAA Regular Season title and its first CAA Conference tournament title in Division 1 History. Elon also earned its first bid in the NCAA tournament in school history.

- Southern Conference
- CAA
- Elon

Record table
| Season | Team | Overall | Conference | Standing | Postseason |
|---|---|---|---|---|---|
Elon Phoenix (Southern Conference) (2011–2014)
| 2011–12 | Elon | 16–14 | 12–8 | T-4th | |
| 2012–13 | Elon | 19–14 | 14–6 | 3rd | WBI Quarterfinals |
| 2013–14 | Elon | 15–16 | 10–8 | T-4th | |
| Elon (SOCON): | | 50–44 (.532) | 36–22 (.621) | | |
Elon Phoenix (Colonial Athletic Association) (2014–present)
| 2014–15 | Elon | 19–13 | 11–7 | T-3rd | WNIT First Round |
| 2015–16 | Elon | 18–13 | 11–7 | 4th | WNIT First Round |
| 2016–17 | Elon | 27–7 | 16–2 | 1st | NCAA First round |
| 2017–18 | Elon | 25–8 | 14–4 | 3rd | NCAA First round |
| 2018–19 | Elon | 9–21 | 4–14 | 8th | |
| 2019–20 | Elon | 14–16 | 8–10 | T–6th | |
| 2020–21 | Elon | 7–8 | 3–5 | T–7th | |
| 2021–22 | Elon | 17–12 | 9–9 | T–6th | |
| 2022–23 | Elon | 9–21 | 5–13 | 11th | |
| 2023–24 | Elon | 11–21 | 7–11 | T–9th | |
| 2024–25 | Elon | 15–15 | 9–9 | T–6th | |
| 2025–26 | Elon | 16–16 | 10–8 | T–6th | |
| 2026–27 | Elon | 0–0 | 0–0 | | |
| Elon (CAA): | | 187–171 (.522) | 107–99 (.519) | | |
| Total: | | 237–215 (.524) | | | |
National champion Postseason invitational champion Conference regular season champion Conference regular season and conference tournament champion Division regular season champion Division regular season and conference tournament champion Conference tournament champion

== WNBA career statistics ==
Legend
| GP | Games played | GS | Games started | MPG | Minutes per game | RPG | Rebounds per game |
| APG | Assists per game | SPG | Steals per game | BPG | Blocks per game | PPG | Points per game |
| TO | Turnovers per game | FG% | Field-goal percentage | 3P% | 3-point field-goal percentage | FT% | Free-throw percentage |
| **Bold** | Career best | ° | League leader |

=== Regular season ===
| Year | Team | GP | GS | MPG | FG% | 3P% | FT% | RPG | APG | SPG | BPG | TO | PPG |
|---|---|---|---|---|---|---|---|---|---|---|---|---|---|
| 1999 | Charlotte | 32 | 24 | 23.3 | 33.0 | 14.3 | 70.7 | 3.6 | 1.8 | 0.3 | 0.2 | 1.6 | 5.4 |
| 2000 | Charlotte | 30 | 7 | 22.0 | 35.2 | 31.6 | **80.0** | 3.5 | 1.8 | 0.5 | **0.6** | 1.6 | 5.2 |
| 2001 | Charlotte | 30 | 24 | 22.6 | 39.0 | 31.3 | 73.4 | 3.4 | 1.7 | 0.5 | 0.4 | 1.4 | 5.7 |
| 2002 | Charlotte | 32 | 32 | 27.8 | 41.0 | 37.4 | 74.1 | 3.8 | 1.7 | **0.7** | 0.5 | 1.9 | 8.0 |
| 2003 | Charlotte | 27 | 9 | 16.4 | 31.6 | 28.1 | 66.7 | 2.2 | 0.7 | 0.4 | 0.1 | 0.9 | 3.5 |
| 2004 | Charlotte | 34 | 34 | 28.7 | **48.1** | **50.0** | 72.6 | **4.1** | 1.2 | 0.5 | 0.4 | 1.6 | **8.2** |
| 2005 | Washington | 34 | 34 | **30.5** | 45.8 | 42.0 | 65.2 | 3.8 | **2.1** | 0.6 | 0.3 | 1.4 | 7.2 |
| 2006 | Indiana | 18 | 2 | 9.6 | 30.8 | 36.4 | 75.0 | 1.3 | 0.4 | 0.2 | 0.1 | **0.7** | 1.9 |
| Career | 8 years, 3 teams | 237 | 166 | 23.6 | 39.7 | 35.1 | 71.7 | 3.4 | 1.5 | 0.5 | 0.3 | 1.4 | 6.0 |

=== Playoffs ===
| Year | Team | GP | GS | MPG | FG% | 3P% | FT% | RPG | APG | SPG | BPG | TO | PPG |
|---|---|---|---|---|---|---|---|---|---|---|---|---|---|
| 1999 | Charlotte | 4 | 4 | 26.5 | 41.9 | 16.7 | 81.8 | **4.5** | 0.8 | **1.0** | 0.0 | **1.8** | **9.0** |
| 2001 | Charlotte | **8** | **8** | **28.0** | 29.6 | **25.0** | 90.9 | 4.0 | **1.8** | 0.8 | 1.0 | 0.9 | 5.9 |
| 2002 | Charlotte | 2 | 2 | 26.5 | 29.4 | 0.0 | **100.0** | 3.5 | 0.0 | 0.5 | 1.0 | 1.0 | 6.0 |
| 2003 | Charlotte | 2 | 0 | 3.5 | **100.0** | 0.0 | 0.0 | 0.5 | 0.5 | 0.0 | 0.0 | 0.0 | 1.0 |
| 2006 | Indiana | 1 | 0 | 1.0 | 0.0 | 0.0 | 0.0 | 0.0 | 0.0 | 0.0 | 0.0 | 0.0 | 0.0 |
| Career | 5 years, 2 teams | 17 | 14 | 23.0 | 34.0 | 18.2 | 87.5 | 3.4 | 1.1 | 0.6 | 0.6 | 0.9 | 5.7 |

== Sources ==
- "Charlotte Smith Bio". Elon Athletic Department.
- "Charlotte Smith Bio". WNBA. Archived from the original on May 25, 2011.
