= Allison Feaster =

American basketball player (born 1976)

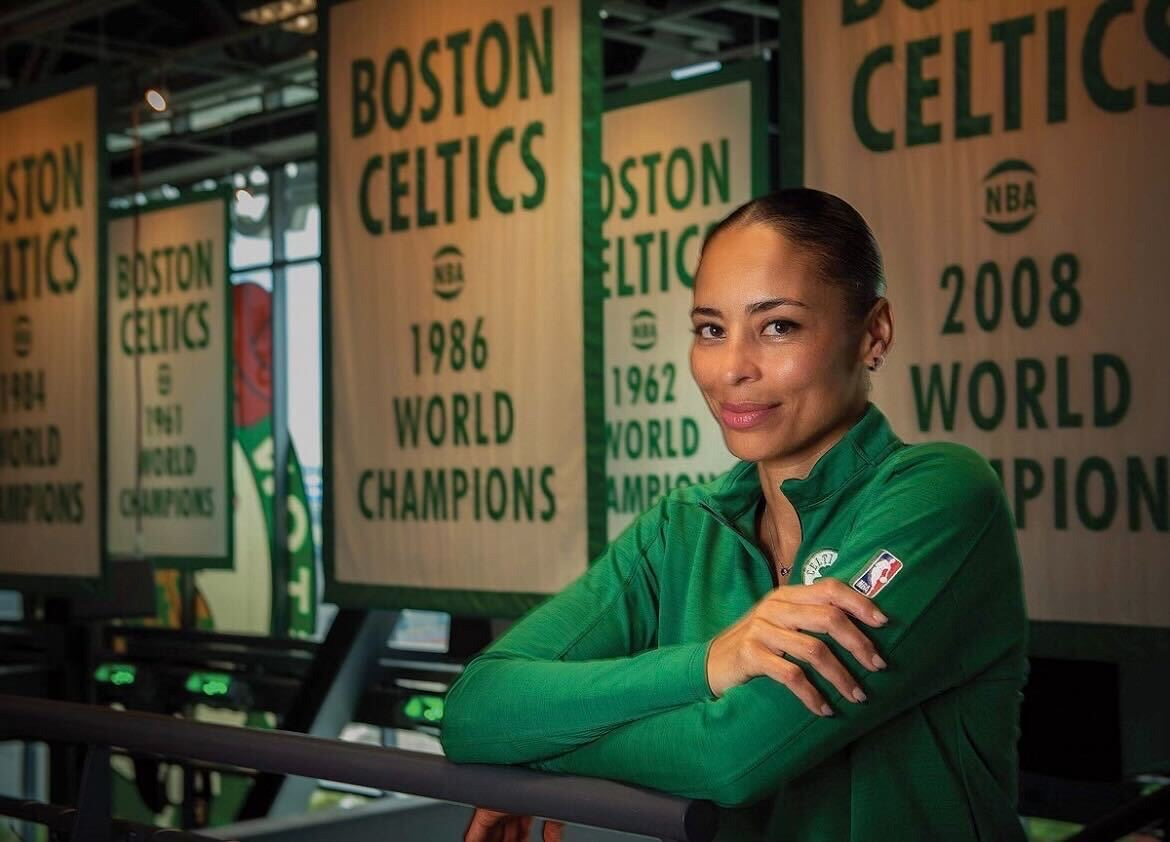
- Feaster in 2022

Boston Celtics
- Title: Vice President of Team Operations & Organizational Growth
- League: NBA

Personal information
- Born: February 11, 1976 (age 50) Chester, South Carolina, U.S.
- Listed height: 5 ft 11 in (1.80 m)
- Listed weight: 168 lb (76 kg)

Career information
- High school: Chester (Chester, South Carolina)
- College: Harvard (1994–1998)
- WNBA draft: 1998: 1st round, 5th overall pick
- Drafted by: Los Angeles Sparks
- Playing career: 1998–2008
- Position: Forward
- Number: 5, 21

Career history
- 1998–2000: Los Angeles Sparks
- 2001–2006: Charlotte Sting
- 2008: Indiana Fever

Career highlights
- WNBA All-Star (2004); Kodak All-American (1998); 3× Ivy League Player of the Year (1996–1998); 4× First-team All-Ivy League (1995–1998); Ivy League Rookie of the Year (1995); 2× NCAA season scoring leader (1997, 1998); NCAA season rebounding leader (1997); South Carolina Miss Basketball (1994)

Career WNBA statistics
- Points: 2,260 (8.0 ppg)
- Rebounds: 693 (2.4 rpg)
- Assists: 406 (1.4 apg)
- Stats at Basketball Reference

Allison Sharlene Feaster-Strong (born February 11, 1976) is a retired American professional basketball player. Feaster played in the Women's National Basketball Association from 1998 through 2008 for the Los Angeles Sparks, Charlotte Sting, and Indiana Fever. She played professionally in Europe from 1998 through 2016 for teams in Portugal, France, Spain, and Italy. She retired from professional basketball on August 8, 2016.

Feaster attended Harvard College, graduating in 1998 with a degree in Economics, and setting multiple Ivy League women's basketball records along the way. She was selected as a first-team All-Ivy League player each of her four years, and was the first athlete in any sport to be honored as Ivy League Player of the Year three times, after also having been Ivy League Rookie of the Year.

== Biography ==
Allison Sharlene Feaster was born February 11, 1976, in Chester, South Carolina to William Preston Feaster III and Sandra Feaster. Nicknamed "Charley," Feaster began playing basketball at the age of seven. She tried out for her high school team as a 5-foot, 9 inch seventh grader, and made the team as a starter.

Feaster's parents separated when she was in fifth grade, and she has credited her mother, who returned to college herself around the time of the separation, with instilling the importance of academics. Feaster ultimately graduated as valedictorian of her high school class, and turned down athletic scholarships so that she could determine her own academic focus during her college years.

Feaster is married to Danny Strong, her high school sweetheart, who also played college basketball, at North Carolina State University, and has a daughter, Sarah, born in February, 2006. The couple both played in Europe during the WNBA's off-season, and after several years playing in France they were naturalized as French citizens. Feaster has competed under the name Allison Feaster in the WNBA and as Allison Feaster-Strong overseas.

In August 2012 Feaster traveled to Myanmar, and in August 2014 to the Philippines, as a Sports Diplomacy Sports Envoy for the U.S. Department of State. She worked with Derrick Alston, Erik Spoelstra, Richard Cho, Darvin Ham, and Marty Conlon to conduct basketball clinics and events for youth and women from underserved areas.

== Basketball career ==
=== High School ===
- 1990–1994: Chester High School, South Carolina

Feaster graduated first in her class from Chester High School, in Chester, South Carolina, having won a state basketball championship (in 1993), two South Carolina Player of the Year awards (in 1993 and 1994), and multiple All-American Basketball Team honors (Parade, 1994; Street & Smith, 1993 & 1994). She began playing high school basketball in the seventh grade, and received her first All-State honors as an eighth grader. Feaster was the leading scorer (male or female) in South Carolina high school basketball history until January 3, 2003, when her record of 3,427 points was broken by Ivory Latta.

=== College ===
- 1994–1998: Harvard University (NCAA)

Upon joining the Harvard team in 1994, Feaster was an immediate star, averaging 17.0 points and a league-leading 11.8 rebounds per game. She was selected to the All-Ivy first team and was unanimously voted the league's Rookie of the Year.

As a sophomore, Feaster averaged 18.1 points and 10.1 rebounds per game and was honored as Ivy League Player of the Year, as the Crimson won the first of three consecutive league championships. With the championship, the team secured its first-ever berth in the NCAA tournament. Although they led 41–40 at the half, the 14th-seeded Crimson lost their first-round game to the Vanderbilt Commodores, 100–83.

Feaster led the Crimson in almost every statistical category in her junior season. She increased her scoring average to 21.8 points per game and her rebounding to 10.8 per game, while also leading the team in steals, blocks, three-point field goals, and shooting percentage. She was again Ivy League Player of the Year. The 1996-97 Crimson were the first women's basketball team ever to go undefeated in Ivy League play (14–0; 20–6 overall), but were a No. 16 seed in the NCAA Tournament, and lost their opening round game at Carmichael Arena to the North Carolina Tar Heels.

In her senior year at Harvard, Feaster led the nation in scoring, at 28.5 points per game, was 14th in rebounding (10.8 per game), and 16th in steals (3.3 per game). She was again honored as Ivy League Player of the Year and was also selected to the Kodak Division I Women's All-America Basketball Team. Despite a 22–4 record, the Ivy League champion Crimson were again a No. 16 seed for the NCAA Tournament. They played the No. 1 seeded Stanford Cardinal on Maples Pavilion, Stanford's home floor. When Harvard won the game, 71–67, backed by 35 points and 13 rebounds from Feaster, they became (until UMBC's defeat of UVA in 2018) the only No. 16 seed in the history of the NCAA men's or women's Division I basketball tournament to defeat a No. 1 seed in the first round. No other team seeded lower than No. 13 has ever won a game in the women's NCAA Tournament.

Feaster finished her college career with 2,312 points (second all-time in the Ivy League), 1,157 rebounds (third all-time in the Ivy League), and 290 steals (third all-time in the Ivy League). She has been identified by several sources as the greatest women's basketball player in the history of the league and was one of five players chosen for the Ivy League all-time women's basketball team in 2015. She remains, as of 2016, one of only two Ivy League players ever to score 2,000 points and record 1,000 rebounds in a career; the other is Bill Bradley. Feaster was the first Ivy League player ever selected in the WNBA draft (the second was Blake Dietrick, 16 years later), and until July 5, 2016, when Dietrick signed the first of two seven-day contracts with the San Antonio Stars, Feaster was the only Ivy League graduate to appear on a WNBA roster or play in the league.

=== Europe ===
- 1998–1999: Anadia Sanitana (Portugal)
- 1999–2001: (France) ASPTT Aix-en-Provence
- 2001–2005: (France) US Valenciennes Olympic
- 2006–2007: (Spain) Ros Casares Valencia
- 2007–2008: (Spain) C.B. San José León
- 2008–2009: (Italy) Famila Wuber Schio
- 2009–2011: (Spain) Mann Filter Zaragoza
- 2011–2012: (Spain) Perfumerías Avenida Baloncesto
- 2012–2013: (Spain) Uni Girona CB
- 2013–2016: (Spain) C.B. Alcobendas

Like many WNBA players, Feaster has played in Europe from fall to spring. Her longest tours have been in France (with Aix-en-Provence and Valenciennes, from 1999 to 2005) and in Spain (with several teams, from 2006 to 2008 and 2011–2016).

Feaster's Valenciennes team won the French League title for four years straight from 2001 to 2002 through 2004-05 and won the EuroLeague Women title in 2001-02 and 2003–04. Her Ros Casares Valencia team was the EuroLeague runner-up in 2006–07.

C.B. Alcobendas announced on August 8, 2016, that Feaster had retired from professional basketball.

=== WNBA ===
- 1998–2000 : Los Angeles Sparks
- 2001–2006 : Charlotte Sting
- 2008: Indiana Fever

Listed at 5 feet, 11 inches, Feaster was originally drafted by the Los Angeles Sparks as the fifth overall selection in the first round of the 1998 WNBA draft. However, she broke her foot three games into her rookie season, missing the rest of the year. She principally played off the bench during her three seasons for the Sparks, averaging between 12.8 and 14.7 minutes per game The Sparks lost in the Western Conference Finals in both 1999 and 2000.

On October 11, 2000, Feaster was traded to the Charlotte Sting along with center Clarisse Machanguana in exchange for Rhonda Mapp and E.C. Hill. Feaster had a larger role with Charlotte, starting all but one game from 2001 through her maternity leave in 2005, and becoming a significant contributor in the Sting's run to the WNBA Finals in 2001. She was in the top five in the league in three-point field goals and attempts from 2001 through 2003, leading in three-pointers made in 2002 and in attempts in 2003. She was second in the league in offensive rating (118.3) and third in offensive win shares (4.1) in 2002.

Although Feaster was on the roster of the Charlotte Sting when the team folded in January 2007, she was not included in the dispersal draft that followed, because she had become an unrestricted free agent at the end of the 2006 season. After sitting out the 2007 WNBA season Feaster signed with the Indiana Fever in March 2008. Feaster played 33 games for the Fever in 2008, all off the bench. On April 20, 2009, the Fever waived her.

== Post-playing career ==
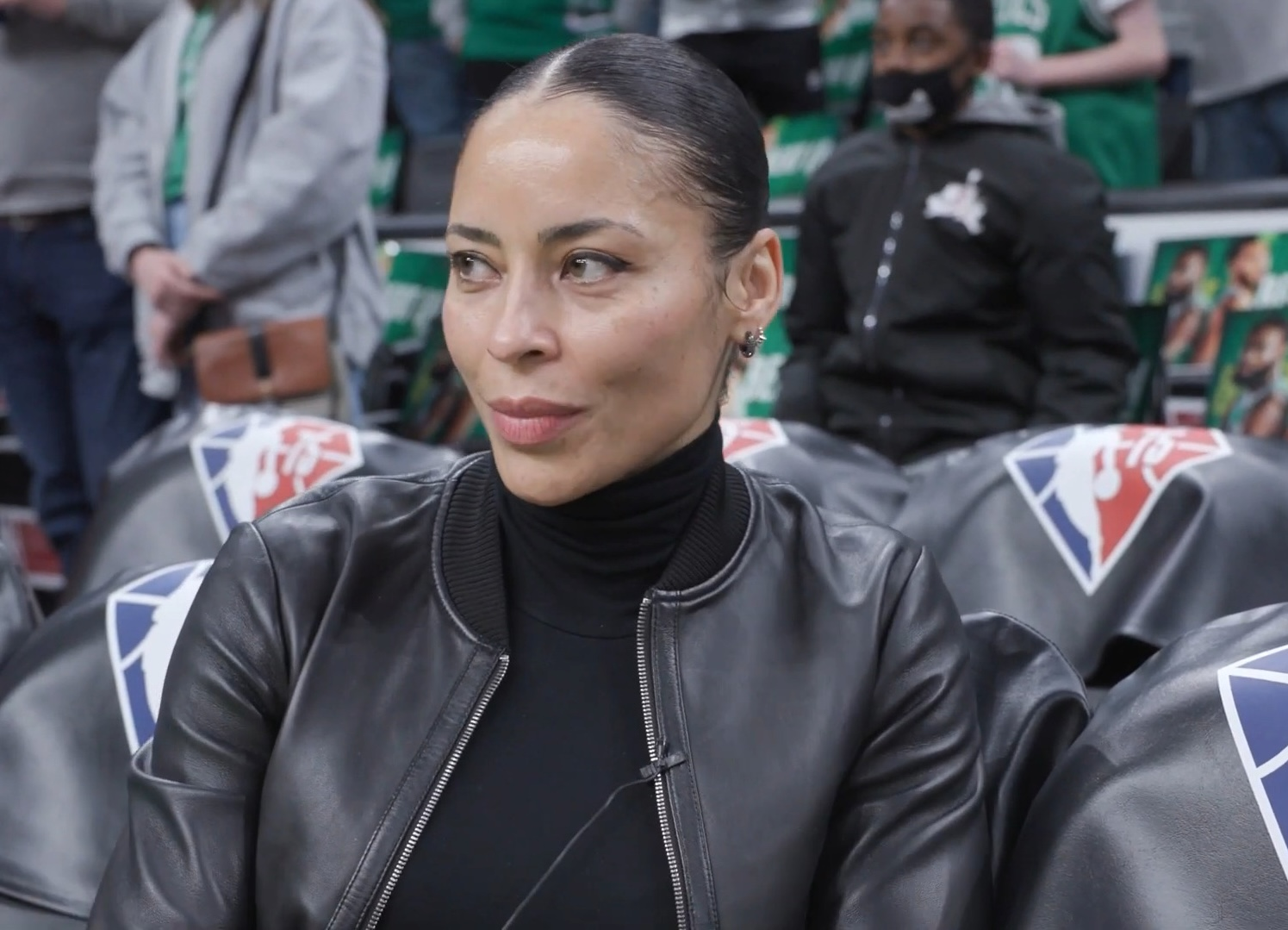
Feaster at a 2022 Boston Celtics game

After retiring from basketball in 2016, Feaster enrolled in the NBA's Basketball Operations Associate Program, completing the one-year program in 2017, and upon completion, took a job as Manager of Player Personnel & Coach Relations in the NBA G League. As of January 2020, she is the director of player development for the Boston Celtics.

== Career statistics ==
Legend
GP	Games played	GS	Games started	MPG	Minutes per game	FG%	Field goal percentage	3P%	3-point field goal percentage
FT%	Free throw percentage	RPG	Rebounds per game	APG	Assists per game	SPG	Steals per game	BPG	Blocks per game
TO	Turnovers per game	PPG	Points per game	**Bold**	Career high	*	Led Division I

=== College ===
Year	Team	GP	Points	FG%	3P%	FT%	RPG	APG	PPG
1994–95	Harvard	26	443	**.530**	.312	.779	**11.2**	1.9	17.0
1995–96	Harvard	27	490	.474	.357	.753	10.2	2.3	18.1
1996–97	Harvard	27	582	.478	.324	.763	*10.7	2.2	*21.6
1997–98	Harvard	**28**	**797**	.519	**.406**	**.796**	10.8	**2.6**	***28.5**
TOTAL		108	2,312	.501	.359	.777	10.7	2.3	21.4

=== Regular season ===
Year	Team	GP	GS	MPG	FG%	3P%	FT%	RPG	APG	SPG	BPG	TO	PPG
1998	Los Angeles	3	0	13.7	.214	.200	**1.000**	0.7	1.0	0.7	0.0	1.3	3.3
1999	Los Angeles	32	4	12.8	**.495**	.368	.684	1.8	1.0	0.5	0.2	0.9	5.1
2000	Los Angeles	32	0	14.7	.359	.259	.833	2.7	1.0	0.7	0.1	1.1	6.3
2001	Charlotte	32	32	31.5	.375	.327	.921	**4.8**	1.4	0.9	0.3	1.8	11.4
2002	Charlotte	32	32	29.9	.394	.418	.824	3.7	1.9	1.2	**0.4**	1.3	11.8
2003	Charlotte	**34**	**34**	**32.2**	.376	.351	.846	3.3	2.1	**1.5**	0.3	2.1	**12.4**
2004	Charlotte	33	32	31.9	.398	.315	.868	2.5	1.8	0.8	0.2	2.1	11.8
2005	Charlotte	21	21	31.7	.377	**.430**	.846	1.8	**2.4**	0.7	0.1	1.8	9.1
2006	Charlotte	32	1	9.7	.235	.250	.500	0.6	0.7	0.4	0.1	**0.4**	1.7
2008	Indiana	33	0	9.1	.337	.307	**1.000**	0.7	0.8	0.2	0.1	**0.4**	2.6
Career	10 years, 3 teams	284	156	22.2	.378	.344	.835	2.4	1.4	0.8	0.1	1.3	8.0

=== Playoffs ===
Year	Team	GP	GS	MPG	FG%	3P%	FT%	RPG	APG	SPG	BPG	TO	PPG
1999	Los Angeles	4	0	8.0	.267	.200	**1.000**	0.5	0.3	0.2	0.0	0.3	3.5
2000	Los Angeles	4	0	11.0	.313	.231	**1.000**	2.3	0.8	0.5	0.2	1.3	3.8
2001	Charlotte	**8**	**8**	31.0	.351	.314	**1.000**	4.3	1.8	**1.1**	**0.5**	1.1	8.0
2002	Charlotte	2	2	**32.5**	.300	.231	.000	**7.5**	**3.5**	1.0	0.0	2.0	7.5
2003	Charlotte	2	2	31.5	.350	.400	.750	2.5	0.5	1.0	0.0	**0.0**	**10.5**
2006	Indiana	2	0	4.0	**.500**	**.500**	.000	0.0	0.0	0.0	0.0	0.5	1.5
Career	6 years, 3 teams	22	12	20.9	.333	.295	.917	3.0	1.2	0.7	0.2	0.9	6.0

== Personal life ==
Feaster was married to Danny Strong. Their daughter, Sarah Strong, plays basketball for the UConn Huskies.

Feaster is married to Milt Newton, Assistant GM for the Milwaukee Bucks.
