= 2001 Orlando Miracle season =

- Head coach: Carolyn Peck
- Arena: TD Waterhouse Centre

Results
- Record: 13–19 (.406)
- Place: 5th (Eastern)
- Playoff finish: Did not qualify

Media
- Television: WRBW (UPN 65); Sunshine Network

The 2001 WNBA season was their third in the league. The Miracle missed the playoffs for the second time in franchise history. The Miracle also hosted the 2001 WNBA All-Star Game.

== Transactions ==
=== WNBA draft ===
Round	Pick	Player	Nationality	School/Team/Country
1	10	Katie Douglas	United States	Purdue
2	26	Brooke Wyckoff	United States	Florida State
3	42	Jaclyn Johnson	United States	Kansas
4	58	Anne Thorius	Denmark	Michigan

=== Transactions ===
Date	Transaction
April 20, 2001	Drafted Katie Douglas, Brooke Wyckoff, Jaclyn Johnson and Anne Thorius in the 2001 WNBA draft
April 30, 2001	Signed Denique Graves, Nakia Sanford, Nyree Roberts, Shaka Massey, Shawnetta Stewart, Tauja Catchings and Tawona Alhaleem
May 1, 2001	Waived Tauja Catchings
May 3, 2001	Waived Nakia Sanford
May 3, 2001	Signed LaCharlotte Smith and Tora Suber
May 4, 2001	Waived Shawnetta Stewart
May 14, 2001	Waived LaCharlotte Smith, Shaka Massey and Tora Suber
May 21, 2001	Waived Jannon Roland
May 22, 2001	Waived Andrea Congreaves
May 26, 2001	Waived Anne Thorius, Denique Graves and Romana Hamzová

== Roster ==
2001 Orlando Miracle roster
Players
Coaches

Pos.	No.	Nat.	Name	Height	Weight	DOB	From	Yrs
G/F	44	(United States)	Alhaleem, Tawona	6' 0" (1.83m)		1974-10-17	DePaul	R
C	28	(Brazil)	dos Santos, Cíntia	6' 5" (1.96m)	187 lb (85kg)	1975-01-31		1
G/F	32	(United States)	Douglas, Katie	6' 0" (1.83m)	165 lb (75kg)	1979-05-07	Purdue	R
F/C	22	(United States)	Hicks, Jessie	6' 4" (1.93m)	188 lb (85kg)	1971-12-02	Maryland	2
F	33	(United States)	Johnson, Jaclyn	6' 0" (1.83m)	201 lb (91kg)	1979-03-16	Kansas	R
G	14	(United States)	Johnson, Shannon	5' 7" (1.7m)	152 lb (69kg)	1974-08-18	South Carolina	2
G	12	(United States)	McCain, Tiffany	5' 10" (1.78m)	160 lb (73kg)	1978-03-08	Kentucky	1
F	10	(United States)	McGhee, Carla	6' 1" (1.85m)	173 lb (78kg)	1968-03-06	Tennessee	2
F/C	11	(United States)	McWilliams-Franklin, Taj	6' 2" (1.88m)	195 lb (88kg)	1970-10-20	St. Edward's	2
G	5	(United States)	Powell, Elaine	5' 8" (1.73m)	150 lb (68kg)	1975-08-09	Louisiana Tech	2
G/F	42	(United States)	Sales, Nykesha	6' 0" (1.83m)	184 lb (83kg)	1976-05-10	Connecticut	2
F	21	(United States)	Wyckoff, Brooke	6' 1" (1.85m)	183 lb (83kg)	1980-03-30	Florida State	R

Head coach
(United States) Carolyn Peck (Vanderbilt)
Assistant coaches
(United States) Charlene Thomas-Swinson
(United States) Michael Peck

Legend

- (C) Team captain
- (DP) Unsigned draft pick
- (FA) Free agent
- (S) Suspended
- Injured

== Schedule ==
=== Regular season ===
2001 game log
Total: 13–19 (Home: 10–6; Road: 3–13)
June: 4–8 (Home: 2–3; Road: 2–5)

Game	Date	Team	Score	High points	High rebounds	High assists	Location Attendance	Record
1	June 1	Los Angeles	L 62–68	Nykesha Sales (20)	McWilliams-Franklin; Sales (6)	Katie Douglas; Sales (3)	TD Waterhouse Centre	0–1
2	June 5	@ Detroit	W 92–71	Nykesha Sales (19)	Taj McWilliams-Franklin (12)	Nykesha Sales (5)	The Palace of Auburn Hills	1–1
3	June 7	@ Utah	L 79–82	Taj McWilliams-Franklin (19)	Hicks; McWilliams-Franklin (6)	Elaine Powell (6)	Delta Center	1–2
4	June 9	Charlotte	L 79–86	Taj McWilliams-Franklin (23)	Elaine Powell (9)	Elaine Powell (8)	TD Waterhouse Centre	1–3
5	June 12	@ Seattle	L 63–70	Taj McWilliams-Franklin (14)	Taj McWilliams-Franklin (7)	Douglas; McWilliams-Franklin; Sales (3)	KeyArena	1–4
6	June 14	@ Los Angeles	L 68–84	Elaine Powell (16)	Taj McWilliams-Franklin (12)	Douglas; McWilliams-Franklin (3)	Staples Center	1–5
7	June 16	@ Phoenix	L 68–72	Nykesha Sales (14)	Taj McWilliams-Franklin (10)	Tiffany McCain (5)	America West Arena	1–6
8	June 18	@ Indiana	W 72–65	Nykesha Sales (20)	Taj McWilliams-Franklin (9)	McWilliams-Franklin; Powell (4)	Conseco Fieldhouse	2–6
9	June 23	Washington	W 67–59	Nykesha Sales (21)	Nykesha Sales (8)	S. Johnson; Wyckoff (4)	TD Waterhouse Centre	3–6
10	June 25	New York	W 67–54	Nykesha Sales (18)	Sales; McWilliams-Franklin (9)	Jessie Hicks (5)	TD Waterhouse Centre	4–6
11	June 27	Cleveland	L 41–65	Brooke Wyckoff (8)	S. Johnson; Sales; Wyckoff (5)	McWilliams-Franklin; Sales (2)	TD Waterhouse Centre	4–7
12	June 30	@ New York	L 60–72	McWilliams-Franklin; Sales (14)	Taj McWilliams-Franklin (9)	Sales; Powell (3)	Madison Square Garden	4–8

July : 5–8 (Home: 4–2; Road: 1–6)

Game	Date	Team	Score	High points	High rebounds	High assists	Location Attendance	Record
13	July 1	@ Washington	L 64–76	S. Johnson; Sales (14)	Taj McWilliams-Franklin (8)	Tiffany McCain (3)	MCI Center	4–9
14	July 6	Sacramento	L 68–75	Nykesha Sales (16)	McWilliams-Franklin; Powell (8)	Taj McWilliams-Franklin (4)	TD Waterhouse Centre	4–10
15	July 8	Detroit	W 73–67	S. Johnson; McWilliams-Franklin (19)	Taj McWilliams-Franklin (10)	Elaine Powell (3)	TD Waterhouse Centre	5–10
16	July 10	Miami	L 63–65 (OT)	S. Johnson; Sales (15)	McWilliams-Franklin; Wyckoff (7)	McWilliams-Franklin; Powell (3)	TD Waterhouse Centre	5–11
17	July 12	@ Charlotte	W 72–69	S. Johnson; Sales (18)	McWilliams-Franklin; Sales (10)	Ahlaheem; McWilliams-Franklin (3)	Charlotte Coliseum	6–11
18	July 13	@ Indiana	L 60–74	Shannon Johnson (21)	Taj McWilliams-Franklin (7)	Shannon Johnson (3)	Conseco Fieldhouse	6–12
19	July 18	Houston	W 57–52	Taj McWilliams-Franklin (16)	Taj McWilliams-Franklin (13)	Shannon Johnson (6)	TD Waterhouse Centre	7–12
20	July 20	@ Charlotte	L 65–72	Taj McWilliams-Franklin (19)	Nykesha Sales (7)	Shannon Johnson (5)	Charlotte Coliseum	7–13
21	July 21	Minnesota	W 71–49	Nykesha Sales (15)	Nykesha Sales (10)	Elaine Powell (5)	TD Waterhouse Centre	8–13
22	July 24	Washington	W 71–63	Nykesha Sales (20)	Taj McWilliams-Franklin (13)	Shannon Johnson (5)	TD Waterhouse Centre	9–13
23	July 27	@ Miami	L 63–71 (OT)	Shannon Johnson (14)	Nykesha Sales (8)	Elaine Powell (5)	American Airlines Arena	9–14
24	July 29	@ Detroit	L 62–64	Hicks; McWilliams-Franklin (15)	Taj McWilliams-Franklin (12)	Elaine Powell (5)	The Palace of Auburn Hills	9–15
25	July 30	@ Cleveland	L 47–65	Nykesha Sales (15)	Brooke Wyckoff (9)	Elaine Powell (2)	Gund Arena	9–16

August : 4–3 (Home: 4–1; Road: 0–2)

Game	Date	Team	Score	High points	High rebounds	High assists	Location Attendance	Record
26	August 1	Portland	W 65–63	Nykesha Sales (21)	Shannon Johnson (9)	Shannon Johnson (5)	TD Waterhouse Centre	10–16
27	August 3	@ Houston	L 60–72	Taj McWilliams-Franklin (17)	Taj McWilliams-Franklin (8)	Elaine Powell (3)	Compaq Center	10–17
28	August 5	Phoenix	W 79–68	Shannon Johnson (25)	Taj McWilliams-Franklin (8)	S. Johnson; Powell (6)	TD Waterhouse Centre	11–17
29	August 7	Cleveland	W 74–67	Douglas; Powell (16)	Shannon Johnson (6)	Shannon Johnson (6)	TD Waterhouse Centre	12–17
30	August 10	@ New York	L 67–77	Nykesha Sales (21)	Nykesha Sales (9)	Katie Douglas (5)	Madison Square Garden	12–18
31	August 11	Miami	L 64–75	Shannon Johnson (16)	Elaine Powell (7)	Nykesha Sales (5)	TD Waterhouse Centre	12–19
32	August 14	Indiana	W 78–72	Katie Douglas (18)	Jessie Hicks (8)	Elaine Powell (4)	TD Waterhouse Centre	13–19

2001 season schedule

=== Season standings ===
Eastern Conference	W	L	PCT	Conf.	GB
Cleveland Rockers ^{x}	22	10	.688	15–6	–
New York Liberty ^{x}	21	11	.656	13–8	1.0
Miami Sol ^{x}	20	12	.625	14–7	2.0
Charlotte Sting ^{x}	18	14	.563	15–6	4.0
Orlando Miracle ^{o}	13	19	.406	9–12	9.0
Indiana Fever ^{o}	10	22	.313	7–14	12.0
Detroit Shock ^{o}	10	22	.313	7–14	12.0
Washington Mystics ^{o}	10	22	.313	4–17	12.0

== Statistics ==
Legend
GP	Games played	GS	Games started	MPG	Minutes per game	RPG	Rebounds per game
APG	Assists per game	SPG	Steals per game	BPG	Blocks per game	PPG	Points per game
FG%	Field-goal percentage	3P%	3-point field-goal percentage	FT%	Free-throw percentage	TO	Turnovers per game
PF	Fouls per game		Team leader		League leader

=== Regular season ===
Player	GP	GS	MPG	FG%	3P%	FT%	RPG	APG	SPG	BPG	PPG
Taj McWilliams-Franklin	32	32	33.1	.474	.200	.744	7.6	2.2	1.6	1.6	12.6
Elaine Powell	32	32	33.0	.402	.382	.755	3.1	3.1	1.5	0.2	11.2
Nykesha Sales	32	31	32.5	.438	.314	.784	5.4	1.8	2.2	0.2	13.5
Shannon Johnson	26	22	30.2	.367	.365	.757	3.0	2.6	1.3	0.2	11.6
Brooke Wyckoff	32	27	20.3	.328	.162	.714	3.8	1.2	0.8	0.5	3.4
Katie Douglas	22	0	20.0	.362	.316	.723	2.3	1.8	1.7	0.3	7.0
Jessie Hicks	32	5	14.3	.389	N/A	.652	2.9	0.7	0.7	0.5	5.3
Tiffany McCain	32	9	13.8	.321	.313	.667	1.2	1.1	0.3	0.3	3.0
Tawona Alhaleem	26	1	9.7	.328	.364	.500	1.5	0.5	0.4	0.0	1.9
Jaclyn Johnson	17	1	8.2	.560	.429	.800	1.4	0.5	0.2	0.2	2.1
Cíntia dos Santos	10	0	6.5	.368	N/A	.833	0.6	0.2	0.3	0.5	1.9
Carla McGhee	17	0	4.2	.250	N/A	.500	0.6	0.0	0.1	0.1	0.8

^{‡}Waived/Released during the season
^{†}Traded during the season
^{≠}Acquired during the season

== Awards and honors ==
- Taj McWilliams-Franklin and Nykesha Sales were named to the WNBA All-Star team.
- Adrienne Johnson received the Hometown Hero Award.
