= Atlantic Coast Conference women's basketball Player of the Year =

ACC women's basketball Player of the Year
- Awarded for: the most outstanding female basketball player in the Atlantic Coast Conference
- Country: United States
- Presented by: Atlantic Coast Sports Media Association (1984–present)

History
- First award: 1984
- Most recent: Hannah Hidalgo, Notre Dame

The Atlantic Coast Conference women's basketball Player of the Year is a basketball award given to the women's basketball player in the Atlantic Coast Conference (ACC) voted as the most outstanding player. It has been presented since the 1983–84, by the Atlantic Coast Sports Media Association. The award was first given to Tresa Brown of North Carolina.

Three players have won the award three times: Alana Beard of Duke, Alyssa Thomas of Maryland, and Elizabeth Kitley of Virginia Tech.

Duke has the most winners with 8 all-time.

== Key ==
†	Co-Players of the Year
*	Awarded a national player of the year award that same season: Associated Press Player of the Year (1994–95 to present); Wade Trophy (1977–78 to present); Naismith College Player of the Year (1982–83 to present); John R. Wooden Award (2003–04 to present)
Player (X)	Denotes the number of times the player had been awarded the ACC Player of the Year award at that point

== Winners ==
Season	Player	School	Position	Class^{[a]}	Reference
1983–84	Tresa Brown	North Carolina	C	Senior	
1984–85	Pam Leake	North Carolina	PG	Junior	
1985–86	Pam Leake (2)	North Carolina	PG	Senior	
1986–87	Chris Moreland	Duke	PF	Junior	
1987–88	Donna Holt	Virginia	PG	Senior	
1988–89	Vicky Bullett	Maryland	F	Senior	
1989–90	Andrea Stinson	NC State	SG	Junior	
1990–91	Dawn Staley*	Virginia	PG	Junior	
1991–92	Dawn Staley (2)*	Virginia	PG	Senior	
1992–93	Heather Burge	Virginia	C	Senior	
1993–94	Jessica Barr	Clemson	PF	Senior	
1994–95	Wendy Palmer	Virginia	F	Junior	
1995–96	Wendy Palmer (2)	Virginia	F	Senior	
1996–97	Tracy Reid	North Carolina	PF	Junior	
1997–98	Tracy Reid (2)	North Carolina	PF	Senior	
1998–99	Summer Erb	NC State	C	Senior	
1999–00	Georgia Schweitzer	Duke	PG	Junior	
2000–01	Georgia Schweitzer (2)	Duke	PG	Senior	
2001–02	Alana Beard	Duke	SG / SF	Sophomore	
2002–03	Alana Beard (2)	Duke	SG / SF	Junior	
2003–04	Alana Beard (3)*	Duke	SG / SF	Senior	
2004–05	Monique Currie	Duke	SF	Junior	
2005–06	Ivory Latta	North Carolina	PG	Junior	
2006–07	Lindsey Harding*	Duke	PG	Senior	
2007–08	Crystal Langhorne	Maryland	PF	Senior	
2008–09	Kristi Toliver	Maryland	PG / SG	Senior	
2009–10	Monica Wright	Virginia	PG	Senior	
2010–11	Shenise Johnson	Miami	PG / SG	Junior	
2011–12	Alyssa Thomas	Maryland	PF	Sophomore	
2012–13	Alyssa Thomas (2)	Maryland	PF	Junior	
2013–14	Alyssa Thomas (3)	Maryland	PF	Senior	
2014–15	Jewell Loyd	Notre Dame	PG / SG	Senior	
2015–16	Myisha Hines-Allen	Louisville	F	Sophomore	
2016–17	Alexis Peterson	Syracuse	PG	Senior	
2017–18	Asia Durr	Louisville	SG	Junior	
2018–19	Asia Durr (2)	Louisville	SG	Senior	
2019–20	Dana Evans	Louisville	SG	Junior	
2020–21	Dana Evans (2)	Louisville	SG	Senior	
2021–22	Elizabeth Kitley	Virginia Tech	C	Junior	
2022–23	Elizabeth Kitley (2)	Virginia Tech	C	Senior	
2023–24	Elizabeth Kitley (3)	Virginia Tech	C	5th-Year Senior	
2024–25	Hannah Hidalgo	Notre Dame	PG / SG	Sophomore	
2025–26	Hannah Hidalgo (2)	Notre Dame	PG / SG	Junior	

== Winners by school ==
School (year joined)	Winners	Years
Duke (1953)	8	1987, 2000, 2001, 2002, 2003, 2004, 2005, 2007
Virginia (1953)	7	1988, 1991, 1992, 1993, 1995, 1996, 2010
Maryland (1953)^{[b]}	6	1989, 2008, 2009, 2012, 2013, 2014
North Carolina (1953)	6	1984, 1985, 1986, 1997, 1998, 2006
Louisville (2014)	5	2016, 2018, 2019, 2020, 2021
Notre Dame (2013)	3	2015, 2025, 2026
Virginia Tech (2004)	3	2022, 2023, 2024
NC State (1953)	2	1990, 1999
Clemson (1953)	1	1994
Miami (FL) (2004)	1	2011
Syracuse (2013)	1	2017
Boston College (2005)	0	—
California (2024)	0	—
Florida State (1991)	0	—
Georgia Tech (1978)	0	—
Pittsburgh (2013)	0	—
SMU (2024)	0	—
Stanford (2024)	0	—
Wake Forest (1953)	0	—

== Footnotes ==
- ^{a} The "Class" column refers to United States terminology indicating that student's year of athletic eligibility, which usually (but not always) corresponds to the year of study. For example, a freshman is in his first year (of four) of eligibility, followed by sophomore, junior and senior.
- ^{b} The University of Maryland left the ACC to join the Big Ten in 2014.
