= Tawona Alhaleem =

American basketball player (born 1974)

Personal information
- Born: October 17, 1974 (age 52) Flint, Michigan, U.S.
- Listed height: 6 ft 0 in (1.83 m)

Career information
- High school: Flint Central (Flint, Michigan)
- College: DePaul (1994–1996)
- Position: Forward / Guard
- Number: 44

Career history
- 2001: Orlando Miracle
- Stats at Basketball Reference

Tawona Alhaleem Hicks (born October 17, 1974), also known as Tawona Alhaleem, is an American former professional basketball player who played for the Orlando Miracle of the Women's National Basketball Association (WNBA). She played college basketball for the DePaul Blue Demons.

== Early life ==
Alhaleem was born on October 17, 1974, in Flint, Michigan. She attended Flint Central High School in Flint.

== College career ==
Alhaleem played two years of junior college basketball at John A. Logan College.

She then transferred to play for the DePaul Blue Demons from 1994–95 to 1995–96. She played in 28 games during the 1994–95 season, averaging 17.0 points per game, 3.9 rebounds per game, and 3.4 assists per game. Alhaleem appeared in 30 games in 1995–96, averaging 13.0 points, 4.9 rebounds, 4.4 assists, and 2.0 steals per game. She then spent one year as a coach at DePaul.

She was inducted into the DePaul Athletics Hall of Fame in 2019.

== Professional career ==
Alhaleem spent 13 years playing professional basketball overseas, including in Greece, Israel, and Turkey. She signed with the Phoenix Mercury of the WNBA for the 1998 season. She was waived by the Mercury on June 4, 1998, a week before the start of the season. Alhaleem was signed by the Orlando Miracle of the WNBA on April 30, 2001. She played in 26 games, starting one, during the 2001 season, averaging 1.9 points and 1.5 rebounds per game. She was waived by the Miracle on May 18, 2002.
