= Clarisse Machanguana =

Mozambican basketball player (born 1976)

Personal information
- Born: 4 October 1976 (age 50) Mozambique
- Listed height: 6 ft 5 in (1.96 m)
- Listed weight: 180 lb (82 kg)

Career information
- College: Old Dominion (1994–1997)
- WNBA draft: 1999: 2nd round, 16th overall pick
- Drafted by: Los Angeles Sparks
- Playing career: 1999–2002
- Position: Center

Career history
- 1999–2000: Los Angeles Sparks
- 2001: Charlotte Sting
- 2002: Orlando Miracle
- 2003: Tarbes Gespe Bigorre

Career highlights
- Kodak All-American (1997); Second-team All-American – AP (1997); CAA Player of the Year (1995); CAA All-Defensive Team (1997); 3× First-team All-CAA (1995, 1996, 1997); CAA All-Freshman Team (1995)
- Stats at Basketball Reference
- FIBA Hall of Fame

Clarisse Machanguana (born 4 October 1976) is a former college and professional women's basketball player and philanthropist from Mozambique. Machanguana played internationally in both the United States (WNBA from 1999 to 2002) and in Spain (FC Barcelona in 2003). She also represented Mozambique at the 2006 Lusophony Games in Macau, China. In 2014, Machanguana founded the Clarisse Machanguana Foundation, which empowers Mozambican youth through sport, education and health. Machanguana was the UNICEF ambassador to Mozambique from 2016 to 2018. In April 2026, Machanguana was inducted into the FIBA basketball Hall of Fame.

== Early life ==
Machanguana was born in Mozambique on October 4, 1976. At age 15, Machanguana led the Mozambique national team to a gold medal in the African Games. At 19, she moved to Portugal to attend preparatory school and play basketball. She followed her friend, Portuguese basketball player Ticha Penicheiro, to Old Dominion University.

== College basketball career at Old Dominion University ==
Machanguana starred at Old Dominion, where she played three seasons (1994-1997), averaging 18.3 points, 7.6 rebounds, and shot 62.4% from the field. In 1995, Machanguana was named to the Colonial Athletic Association (CAA) All-Freshman Team, named 1st team All-CAA, and was named CAA Player of the Year. In 1996 and 1997, Machanguana was named 1st team All-CAA and the Colonial Athletic Association Tournament MVP.

In the 1996-97 season, Machanguana and Penicheiro led the Lady Monarchs to a 34-2 record and to the NCAA title game, where Old Dominion lost to Tennessee in the national championship game. Machanguana was named to the 1997 NCAA All-Tournament team, the 1996-97 AP All-America second team, was CAA All-Defense, and was named to the 1996-97 WBCA All-America team.

Old Dominion was 88-11 during Machanguana's three years.

In 2000, Old Dominion retired Machanguana's jersey. In 2006, Machanguana was inducted into Old Dominion's Hall of Fame.

Legend
GP	Games played	GS	Games started	MPG	Minutes per game
FG%	Field goal percentage	3P%	3-point field goal percentage	FT%	Free throw percentage
RPG	Rebounds per game	APG	Assists per game	SPG	Steals per game
BPG	Blocks per game	PPG	Points per game	**Bold**	Career high

Year	Team	GP	Points	FG%	FT%	RPG	APG	BPG	PPG
1994-95	Old Dominion University	33	550	60.5%	59.3%	**8.8**	1.8	0.8	16.7
1995-96	Old Dominion University	32	585	62.7%	**71.4%**	6.5	1.5	0.8	18.3
1996-97	Old Dominion University	**34**	**678**	**63.6%**	57.3%	7.4	**1.9**	**1.0**	**19.9**
Career	Old Dominion University	99	1813	62.4%	62.5%	7.6	1.8	0.9	18.3

== WNBA career ==
Machanguana played four seasons in the WNBA (1999-2002). Machanguana was drafted in the 2nd round (4th pick, 16th overall) in the 1999 WNBA draft by the Los Angeles Sparks. With the Sparks, she played in 59 games over two seasons, starting one game and averaging 3.1 points per game. On October 11, 2000, Machanguana was traded to the Charlotte Sting. During the 2001 season for the Sting, Machuanga played in 30 games, starting eight games and averaging 5.4 points per game. On April 18, 2002, Machanguana was traded from the Sting to the Orlando Miracle. In Orlando, Machanguana played in 29 games, starting in 25 games and averaging 4.8 points per game. Machanguana's 2002 season with the Orlanda Magic was her last season in the WNBA.

== Post-WNBA basketball career ==
Since leaving the WNBA after the 2002 season, Machanguana joined F.C. Barcelona in Spain. At the 2006 Lusophony Games, she led the Mozambique women's national basketball team to a gold medal. Machanguana played professionally in Portugal, Brazil, France, Korea, Spain, and Italy.

== Non-profit work ==
After retiring from basketball, Machanguana returned to Mozambique. Local nonprofits approached her to represent them due to her name recognition and wide reach. Through this work, she learned more about the HIV epidemic in Mozambique.

In 2014, founded the Fundação Clarisse Machanguana (Clarisse Machanguana Foundation), which empowers Mozambiquan youth through sport, education and health. In spring 2016, Machanguana began a trek across Mozambique to bring awareness to the country's HIV epidemic and obstetric fistula.

From May 2016 to May 2018, Machanguana was appointed UNICEF ambassador to Mozambique in recognition of her commitment to child rights, girls empowerment, and adolescent empowerment.

During the COVID-19 pandemic, Machanguana approached the U.S. Embassy in Mozambique for aid in obtaining a scholarship to learn about nonprofit management. She was awarded a scholarship through the Fulbright Program and, in 2022, Machanguana graduated from Arizona State University's Thunderbird School of Global Management with a Master’s degree in global management (with a nonprofit management concentration).

In 2026, Machanguana's home in Marracuene, just outside of Maputo, was devastated by flooding from the Incomati River, in an event that killed nearly 300 people and displaced nearly 500,000 others.

== Career statistics ==
Legend
GP	Games played	GS	Games started	MPG	Minutes per game	RPG	Rebounds per game
APG	Assists per game	SPG	Steals per game	BPG	Blocks per game	PPG	Points per game
TO	Turnovers per game	FG%	Field-goal percentage	3P%	3-point field-goal percentage	FT%	Free-throw percentage
**Bold**	Career best	°	League leader

=== Regular season ===
Year	Team	GP	GS	MPG	FG%	3P%	FT%	RPG	APG	SPG	BPG	TO	PPG
1999	Los Angeles	28	0	8.8	.490	.000	**.722**	1.9	0.3	0.3	0.1	0.5	2.6
2000	Los Angeles	**31**	1	13.6	**.578**	.000	.560	2.3	**0.6**	0.4	0.1	0.6	3.5
2001	Charlotte	30	8	**19.3**	.500	.000	.649	**4.0**	**0.6**	**0.5**	**0.5**	**1.4**	**5.4**
2002	Orlando	29	**25**	14.8	.535	.000	.640	2.2	**0.6**	0.4	0.1	1.1	4.8
Career	4 years, 3 teams	118	34	14.2	.527	.000	.650	2.6	0.5	0.4	0.2	0.9	4.1

=== Playoffs ===
Year	Team	GP	GS	MPG	FG%	3P%	FT%	RPG	APG	SPG	BPG	TO	PPG
1999	Los Angeles	1	0	7.0	**.667**	.000	.000	2.0	0.0	0.0	0.0	0.0	4.0
2000	Los Angeles	4	0	11.8	.500	.000	**.667**	**2.8**	0.0	0.3	0.3	0.3	3.0
2001	Charlotte	**8**	0	**16.5**	.531	—	**.667**	2.4	**0.3**	**0.4**	**0.4**	**0.8**	**4.8**
Career	3 years, 2 teams	13	0	14.3	.535	.000	.667	2.5	0.2	0.3	0.3	0.5	4.2

== Sources ==
- Player profile at wnba.com
