= Houston Comets =

Women's National Basketball Association team in Houston, Texas

- 2027 Houston Comets season
- Conference: Western
- Leagues: WNBA
- Founded: 1999
- History: Orlando Miracle; 1999–2002; Connecticut Sun; 2003–2026; Houston Comets; 2027–present
- Arena: Toyota Center
- Location: Houston, Texas
- Team colors: Red, navy blue, silver
- President: Jennifer Rizzotti
- General manager: Morgan Tuck
- Head coach: Rachid Meziane
- Ownership: Tilman Fertitta
- Championships: 0
- Conference titles: 2 (2004, 2005) (Note: The WNBA awarded conference championships to the winners of the Conference Finals in the playoffs from 1998 to 2015.)
- Website: comets.wnba.com

The Houston Comets are an American professional basketball team based in Houston, Texas. The Comets compete in the Women's National Basketball Association (WNBA) as a member of the Western Conference.

The team was established as the Orlando Miracle in 1999, during the league's expansion from ten to twelve teams, as a sister team to the NBA's Orlando Magic. In 2003, as financial strains left the team on the brink of disbanding, the Mohegan Indian tribe purchased and relocated the team to Mohegan Sun as the Connecticut Sun, it became the first Native American tribe to own a professional sports franchise. The team's name came from its affiliation with Mohegan Sun and its logo was reflective of a modern interpretation of an ancient Mohegan symbol.

In March 2026, the Fertitta family, owners of the NBA's Houston Rockets, purchased the Connecticut Sun and relocated them to Houston, where they were renamed the Houston Comets, taking the name of the original Houston Comets from 1997 to 2008, and begin playing as the new Comets in 2027. However, the history of the original Comets were not transferred to new Comets, who had the Sun’s team history and records follow the organization to Houston.

== History ==
=== Orlando Miracle (1999–2002) ===
Before the franchise relocated to Connecticut in 2003 and then relocated again to Houston in 2026, the team operated as the Orlando Miracle. The Miracle played their home games at TD Waterhouse Centre in Orlando, Florida, as the sister team of the Orlando Magic. After the 2002 season, the NBA sold off all of the WNBA franchises to the operators of the respective teams, which placed the league in the middle of team contractions, relocations, and potential labor strife. Since Magic ownership was no longer interested in retaining the rights to the Miracle and no local partnership was reached, the organization ceased operations and was purchased by the Mohegan Tribe. On January 28, 2003, it was announced that the Miracle would immediately move to Uncasville, Connecticut and change its nickname to the Sun (in reference to the Mohegan Sun casino). The Sun's nickname, color scheme and logo were similar to that of another defunct Florida-based franchise, the Miami Sol, which folded at the same time as the Miracle's relocation to Connecticut.

=== Connecticut Sun (2003–2026) ===
In January 2003, The Miracle were relocated to Connecticut as the Connecticut Sun.

On May 12, 2025, Sportico reported that the Mohegan tribe had retained investment bank Allen & Company to explore a sale of the team, with Sportico commenting that a relocation out of Connecticut was "likely." On August 2, 2025, The Boston Globe reported that Boston Celtics minority owner Stephen Pagliuca would purchase the Sun with the intent of relocating the team to Boston by 2027. That following day, however, the Hartford Courant reported that Marc Lasry, a Connecticut native and former co-owner of the Milwaukee Bucks, made a bid to buy the team, which would move them to Hartford. The WNBA was reportedly unwilling to accept either bid on the grounds that neither city had applied for an expansion team during the most recent round of expansion. Instead, it was reported that the WNBA preferred that, should the Sun be sold, that it be sold to ownership tied to nine cities that had recently made unsuccessful bids for expansion teams, specifically Houston Rockets owner Tilman Fertitta or Cleveland Cavaliers owner Dan Gilbert. On September 4, ESPN reported that the state of Connecticut sent a proposal of its own to purchase a minority stake in the Sun, which would allow the construction of a practice facility and a limited slate of games at PeoplesBank Arena in Hartford.

Amid reports regarding the sale, Connecticut state officials, including Governor Ned Lamont and State Comptroller Sean Scanlon, expressed support for the Sun remaining in Connecticut while criticizing the WNBA for their alleged desire to move the team out of New England, and fans campaigned to keep them from leaving the state. On September 8, Senator Richard Blumenthal sent a letter to WNBA Commissioner Cathy Engelbert urging the WNBA not to interfere with sale negotiations, warning that such actions could be considered violations of antitrust law, followed on September 11 by a letter of inquiry from Attorney General William Tong requesting information regarding the league's rules, regulations, and the Sun's valuations. On September 16, NBA commissioner Adam Silver defended the WNBA's role in the negotiations, claiming that a sale with the intent to relocate was a violation of league rules, and reiterated that neither Boston nor Hartford had applied for an expansion team, despite the latter city being within the Sun's exclusive marketing territory, which Blumenthal had previously stated meant that requiring Hartford to apply for expansion made no sense.

On December 19, ESPN reported that the Sun and Rockets owner Tilman Fertitta were nearing an agreement for a sale that would result in the Sun relocating to Houston, which last hosted the Houston Comets from 1997 until the team folded in 2008.

On March 27, 2026, the Associated Press reported that Fertitta agreed to purchase the Sun and relocate the franchise to Houston, where they would take on the Comets name upon approval from the WNBA Board of Governors. On May 13, 2026, the WNBA and NBA Boards of Governors unanimously approved the sale of the Sun to Fertitta and the franchise's relocation to Houston, where the team would revive the Houston Comets name beginning with the 2027 season.

=== Current home ===
The Comets will play at the Toyota Center, beginning with the 2027 season.

== Season-by-season records ==
Season	Team	Conference		Regular season			Playoff results	Head coach
Season	Team	Conference		W	L	PCT	Playoff results	Head coach
Orlando Miracle
1999	1999	East	4th	15	17	.469	Did not qualify	Carolyn Peck
2000	2000	East	3rd	16	16	.500	Lost Conference Semifinals (Cleveland, 1–2)	Carolyn Peck
2001	2001	East	5th	13	19	.406	Did not qualify	Carolyn Peck
2002	2002	East	5th	16	16	.500	Did not qualify	Dee Brown
Connecticut Sun
2003	2003	East	3rd	18	16	.529	Won Conference Semifinals (Charlotte, 2–0); Lost Conference Finals (Detroit, 0–2)	Mike Thibault
2004	2004	East	1st	18	16	.529	Won Conference Semifinals (Washington, 2–1); Won Conference Finals (New York, 2–0); Lost WNBA Finals (Seattle, 1–2)	Mike Thibault
2005	2005	East	1st	26	8	.765	Won Conference Semifinals (Detroit, 2–0); Won Conference Finals (Indiana, 2–0); Lost WNBA Finals (Sacramento, 1–3)	Mike Thibault
2006	2006	East	1st	26	8	.765	Won Conference Semifinals (Washington, 2–0); Lost Conference Finals (Detroit, 1–2)	Mike Thibault
2007	2007	East	3rd	18	16	.529	Lost Conference Semifinals (Indiana, 1–2)	Mike Thibault
2008	2008	East	2nd	21	13	.618	Lost Conference Semifinals (New York, 1–2)	Mike Thibault
2009	2009	East	6th	16	18	.471	Did not qualify	Mike Thibault
2010	2010	East	5th	17	17	.500	Did not qualify	Mike Thibault
2011	2011	East	2nd	21	13	.618	Lost Conference Semifinals (Atlanta, 0–2)	Mike Thibault
2012	2012	East	1st	25	9	.735	Won Conference Semifinals (New York, 2–0); Lost Conference Finals (Indiana, 1–2)	Mike Thibault
2013	2013	East	6th	10	24	.294	Did not qualify	Anne Donovan
2014	2014	East	6th	13	21	.382	Did not qualify	Anne Donovan
2015	2015	East	6th	15	19	.441	Did not qualify	Anne Donovan
2016	2016	East	5th	14	20	.412	Did not qualify	Curt Miller
2017	2017	East	2nd	21	13	.656	Lost Second Round (Phoenix, 0–1)	Curt Miller
2018	2018	East	3rd	21	13	.656	Lost Second Round (Phoenix, 0–1)	Curt Miller
2019	2019	East	2nd	23	11	.676	Won Semifinals (Los Angeles, 3–0); Lost WNBA Finals (Washington, 2–3)	Curt Miller
2020	2020	East	2nd	10	12	.455	Won First Round (Chicago, 1–0); Won Second Round (Los Angeles, 1–0); Lost Semifinals (Las Vegas, 2–3)	Curt Miller
2021	2021	East	1st	26	6	.813	Lost Semifinals (Chicago, 1–3)	Curt Miller
2022	2022	East	2nd	25	11	.694	Won First Round (Dallas, 2–1); Won Semifinals (Chicago, 3–2); Lost WNBA Finals (Las Vegas, 1–3)	Curt Miller
2023	2023	East	2nd	27	13	.675	Won First Round (Minnesota, 2–1); Lost Semifinals (New York, 1–3)	Stephanie White
2024	2024	East	2nd	28	12	.700	Won First Round (Indiana, 2–0); Lost Semifinals (Minnesota, 2–3)	Stephanie White
2025	2025	East	5th	11	33	.250	Did not qualify	Rachid Meziane
2026	2026	East	T-6th	11	33	.250	Did not qualify	Rachid Meziane
Houston Comets
Regular season				462	384	.562	2 Conference Championships	
Playoffs				44	44	.500	0 WNBA Championships	

== Current Roster ==
=== 2027 roster ===
2027 Houston Comets roster
Players
Coaches

Pos.	No.	Nat.	Name	Height	Weight	DOB	From	Yrs
F	33	(France)	Angloma, Nell	6' 1" (1.85m)		2006-06-12	France	R
F	15	(United States)	Beers, Raegan	6' 4" (1.93m)	244 lb (111kg)	2004-07-23	Oklahoma	R
G/F	25	(United States)	Burke, Kennedy	6' 1" (1.85m)	199 lb (90kg)	1997-02-14	UCLA	6
F	8	(Canada)	Edwards, Aaliyah	6' 3" (1.91m)	206 lb (93kg)	2002-07-09	Connecticut	2
C	42	(United States)	Griner, Brittney	6' 9" (2.06m)	219 lb (99kg)	1990-10-18	Baylor	11
G	3	(United States)	Jackson, Ashlon	6' 0" (1.83m)	170 lb (77kg)	2004-01-06	Duke	R
G	5	(United States)	Kneepkens, Gianna	5' 11" (1.8m)	174 lb (79kg)	2003-03-04	UCLA	R
G	47	(France)	Lacan, Leïla	5' 11" (1.8m)		2004-06-02	France	1
G	4	(New Zealand)	Leger-Walker, Charlisse	5' 10" (1.78m)	190 lb (86kg)	2001-09-15	UCLA	R
F/C	13	(United States)	Marshall, Rayah	6' 4" (1.93m)		2003-10-15	USC	1
F	1	(United States)	Miller, Diamond	6' 1" (1.85m)	178 lb (81kg)	2001-02-11	Maryland	3
C	10	(United States)	Nelson-Ododa, Olivia	6' 5" (1.96m)	179 lb (81kg)	2000-08-17	Connecticut	3
G	22	(United States)	Rivers, Saniya	6' 1" (1.85m)	159 lb (72kg)	2003-03-04	NC State	1
G	2	(United States)	Van Lith, Hailey	5' 9" (1.75m)	157 lb (71kg)	2001-09-09	TCU	1

Head coach
(France) Rachid Meziane
Assistant coaches
(Belgium) Pascal Angillis
(United States) Roneeka Hodges (Florida State)
(United States) Ashlee McGee (Austin Peay)
Player development
(United States) Kevin Owens (Trinity University)
(United States) Bak Sawi (Allegany College of Maryland)
Athletic trainer
(United States) Terri Acosta (North Texas)
Assistant trainer
(United States) Brianna Robinson (FIU)
Strength and conditioning coach
(United States) Analisse Rios (Connecticut College)

Legend

- (C) Team captain
- (DP) Unsigned draft pick
- (FA) Free agent
- (S) Suspended
- Injured

WNBA roster page

=== International rights ===
Nationality	Name	Years pro	Last played	Drafted
(Mali)	Astan Dabo	0	N/A	2012
(United Kingdom)	Johannah Leedham	0	N/A	2010
(Spain)	Alba Torrens	0	N/A	2009

=== Honored numbers ===
Houston Comets honored numbers
No.	Player	Position	Tenure
12	Margo Dydek	C	2005–07
13	Lindsay Whalen	G	2004–09
23	Katie Douglas	G/F	2001–07
42	Nykesha Sales	F	1999–2007

=== FIBA Hall of Fame ===
Houston Comets Hall of Famers
Players
No.	Name	Position	Tenure	Inducted
12	Margo Dydek	C	2005–07	2019

== Management, coaches and staff ==
=== Owners ===
- RDV Sports, Inc., owner of the Orlando Magic (1998–2002)
- Mohegan Sun, owner of the Connecticut Sun (2003–2026)
- Tilman Fertitta (2027–present)

=== Head coaches ===
Houston Comets head coaches
Name	Start	End	Seasons	Regular season				Playoffs			
Name	Start	End	Seasons	W	L	PCT	G	W	L	PCT	G
Carolyn Peck	July 6, 1998	April 3, 2002	4	44	52	.458	96	1	2	.333	3
Dee Brown	April 5, 2002	End of 2002	1	16	16	.500	32	0	0	.000	0
Mike Thibault	March 7, 2003	November 20, 2012	10	206	134	.606	340	20	18	.526	38
Anne Donovan	January 3, 2013	October 1, 2015	3	38	64	.373	102	0	0	.000	0
Curt Miller	December 17, 2015	October 21, 2022	7	136	86	.613	190	16	17	.485	33
Stephanie White	December 9, 2022	October 28, 2024	2	55	25	.688	80	7	7	.500	14
Rachid Meziane	December 4, 2024	present	2	11	33	.250	44	0	0	–	0

=== General managers ===
- Carolyn Peck (1998–2001)
- Dee Brown (2002)
- Chris Sienko (2003–2016)
- Curt Miller (2016–2022)
- Darius Taylor (2023–2024)
- Morgan Tuck (2024–present)

=== Assistant coaches ===
- Rick Stukes (1999–2000)
- Charlene Thomas-Swinson (1999–2001)
- Michael Peck (2001)
- Vonn Read (2002)
- Valerie Still (2002)
- Bernadette Mattox (2003–2012)
- Scott Hawk (2003–2012)
- Catherine Proto (2013)
- Jennifer Gillom (2013–2015)
- Steven Key (2014–2015)
- Nicki Collen (2016–2017)
- Steve Smith (2016–2018)
- Brandi Poole (2018–2022)
- Chris Koclanes (2019–2022)
- Abi Olajuwon (2023–2024)
- Briann January (2023–2024)
- Austin Kelly (2023–2024)
- Roneeka Hodges (2025–present)
- Ashlee McGee (2025–present)
- Pascal Angillis (2025–present)

== Statistics ==
Houston Comets statistics
1990s

Season	Individual			Team vs Opponents		
Season	PPG	RPG	APG	PPG	RPG	FG%
1999	S. Johnson (14.0)	T. McWilliams (7.5)	S. Johnson (4.4)	68.9 vs 69.3	30.2 vs 31.4	.424 vs .429

2000s

Season	Individual			Team vs Opponents		
Season	PPG	RPG	APG	PPG	RPG	FG%
2000	T. McWilliams (13.7)	T. McWilliams (7.6)	S. Johnson (5.3)	69.0 vs 69.8	28.9 vs 31.8	.436 vs .433
2001	N. Sales (13.5)	T. McWilliams (7.6)	E. Powell (3.1)	66.9 vs 68.9	30.3 vs 30.5	.401 vs .440
2002	S. Johnson (16.1)	W. Palmer (5.8)	S. Johnson (5.3)	70.4 vs 70.5	28.6 vs 32.7	.422 vs .432
2003	N. Sales (16.1)	T. McWilliams (6.7)	S. Johnson (5.8)	70.1 vs 70.9	32.2 vs 34.6	.411 vs .411
2004	N. Sales (15.2)	T. McWilliams (7.2)	L. Whalen (4.8)	68.7 vs 67.8	30.7 vs 31.3	.427 vs .430
2005	N. Sales (15.6)	T. McWilliams (7.3)	L. Whalen (5.1)	72.8 vs 66.0	32.6 vs 31.7	.452 vs .398
2006	K. Douglas (16.4)	T. McWilliams (9.6)	L. Whalen (4.6)	78.9 vs 71.1	37.3 vs 33.9	.443 vs .402
2007	K. Douglas (17.0)	M. Dydek (6.5)	L. Whalen (5.0)	78.7 vs 76.3	35.9 vs 34.7	.430 vs .421
2008	A. Jones (17.0)	A. Jones (6.1)	L. Whalen (5.4)	79.1 vs 74.7	36.4 vs 35.3	.422 vs .418
2009	A. Jones (16.7)	S. Gruda (6.3)	L. Whalen (4.6)	78.0 vs 78.1	34.8 vs 37.5	.406 vs .426

2010s

Season	Individual			Team vs Opponents		
Season	PPG	RPG	APG	PPG	RPG	FG%
2010	T. Charles (15.5)	T. Charles (11.7)	R. Montgomery (4.1)	81.0 vs 79.9	36.5 vs 35.6	.427 vs .433
2011	T. Charles (17.6)	T. Charles (11.0)	R. Montgomery (4.9)	80.1 vs 76.8	35.6 vs 36.5	.424 vs .429
2012	T. Charles (18.0)	T. Charles (10.5)	K. Lawson (4.0)	81.6 vs 77.4	34.4 vs 35.3	.431 vs .430
2013	T. Charles (18.0)	T. Charles (10.1)	K. Lawson (4.2)	71.0 vs 76.9	33.9 vs 37.6	.400 vs .436
2014	C. Ogwumike (15.5)	C. Ogwumike (8.5)	A. Bentley (3.7)	75.7 vs 77.5	33.9 vs 33.6	.415 vs .443
2015	K. Bone (15.4)	K. Bone (6.3)	J. Thomas (3.9)	75.0 vs 76.6	31.0 vs 33.6	.422 vs .440
2016	A. Bentley (12.9)	C. Ogwumike (6.7)	J. Thomas (5.1)	83.0 vs 84.4	34.1 vs 33.9	.439 vs .459
2017	J. Jones (15.4)	J. Jones (11.9)	A. Thomas (4.5)	86.0 vs 81.6	36.7 vs 33.8	.448 vs .435
2018	C. Ogwumike (14.4)	A. Thomas (8.1)	J. Thomas (4.8)	87.6 vs 81.7	36.9 vs 32.0	.466 vs .443
2019	J. Jones (14.6)	J. Jones (9.7)	J. Thomas (5.1)	80.8 vs 77.9	36.8 vs 33.3	.423 vs .439

2020s

Season	Individual			Team vs Opponents		
Season	PPG	RPG	APG	PPG	RPG	FG%
2020	D. Bonner (19.7)	A. Thomas (9.0)	A. Thomas (4.8)	80.4 vs 79.9	35.5 vs 33.0	.427 vs .443
2021	J. Jones (19.4)	J. Jones (11.2)	J. Thomas (4.0)	79.7 vs 69.9	36.6 vs 27.3	.444 vs .409
2022	J. Jones (14.6)	J. Jones (8.6)	A. Thomas (6.1)	85.8 vs 77.8	37.1 vs 29.0	.462 vs .439
2023	D. Bonner (17.4)	A. Thomas (9.9)	A. Thomas (7.9)	82.7 vs 79.9	33.6 vs 33.9	.445 vs .435
2024	D. Bonner (15.0)	A. Thomas (8.4)	A. Thomas (7.9)	80.1 vs 73.6	33.5 vs 31.7	.444 vs .431
2025	T. Charles (16.3)	A. Morrow (6.9)	M. Mabrey (4.0)	75.8 vs 86.0	31.9 vs 35.3	.412 vs .466

== Media coverage ==
The Comets television rights are held by KHOU and KTBU beginning with the 2027 season and will also simulcast locally on Space City Home Network as well.

== All-time notes ==
=== Regular season attendance ===
- A sellout for a basketball game at TD Waterhouse Centre (Orlando) is 17,248.
- A sellout for a basketball game at Mohegan Sun Arena (Connecticut) is:
  - 9,518 from 2003 to 2010.
  - 9,323 since 2011.

Regular season all-time attendance
Orlando Miracle
Year	Average	High	Low	Sellouts	Total for year	WNBA game average
1999	9,801 (6th)	15,442	7,028	0	156,818	10,207
2000	7,363 (11th)	9,464	5,731	0	117,810	9,074
2001	7,430 (11th)	11,903	5,363	0	118,874	9,105
2002	7,115 (13th)	13,111	4,323	0	113,837	9,228
Connecticut Sun
Year	Average	High	Low	Sellouts	Total for year	WNBA game average
2003	6,025 (14th)	9,518	4,038	2	102,433	8,826
2004	6,635 (13th)	9,518	3,846	2	112,803	8,589
2005	7,156 (10th)	9,518	5,596	2	121,644	8,172
2006	7,417 (9th)	9,518	6,019	2	126,096	7,476
2007	7,970 (7th)	9,518	6,154	1	135,490	7,819
2008	7,644 (11th)	9,518	5,245	3	129,951	7,948
2009	6,794 (12th)	9,047	5,675	0	115,496	8,029
2010	7,486 (9th)	9,518	6,292	1	127,331	7,834
2011	7,056 (9th)	9,323	6,096	1	119,951	7,954
2012	7,266 (8th)	9,201	5,811	0	123,519	7,452
2013	6,548 (10th)	9,110	4,971	0	111,320	7,531
2014	5,980 (10th)	8,019	4,356	0	101,662	7,578
2015	5,557 (10th)	8,049	4,490	0	94,467	7,184
2016	5,837 (10th)	8,075	4,407	0	99,236	7,655
2017	6,728 (8th)	8,668	4,818	0	114,370	7,716
2018	6,626 (5th)	8,040	5,112	0	106,015	6,721
2019	6,842 (5th)	8,249	4,781	0	116,300	6,535
2020	Due to the COVID-19 pandemic, the season was played in Bradenton, Florida without fans.					
2021	2,992 (3rd)	4,724	2,014	0	44,878	2,636
2022	5,712 (5th)	9,137	4,014	0	102,821	5,679
2023	6,244 (8th)	9,168	4,316	0	124,882	6,615
2024	8,451 (9th)	19,125 (Note: The Sun played one 2024 home game at TD Garden in Boston, MA.)	5,346	9	169,012	9,807
2025	8,653 (10th)	19,156 (Note: The Sun played one 2025 home game at TD Garden in Boston, MA.)	6,848	1	190,369	10,986
2026	8,653 (10th)	19,156 (Note: The Sun played one 2026 home game at TD Garden in Boston, MA.)	6,848	1	190,369	10,986
Houston Comets
Year	Average	High	Low	Sellouts	Total for year	WNBA game average

=== Draft picks ===
- 1999 Expansion Draft: Andrea Congreaves (2), Kisha Ford (4), Yolanda Moore (6), Adrienne Johnson (8)
- 1999: Tari Phillips (8), Sheri Sam (20), Taj McWilliams-Franklin (32), Carla McGhee (44), Elaine Powell (50)
- 2000: Cintia dos Santos (4), Jannon Roland (20), Shawnetta Stewart (36), Romana Hamzová (52)
- 2001: Katie Douglas (10), Brooke Wyckoff (26), Jaclyn Johnson (42), Anne Thorius (58)
- 2002: Davalyn Cunningham (23), Saundra Jackson (39), Tomeka Brown (55)
- 2003 Miami/Portland Dispersal Draft: Debbie Black (6)
- 2003: Courtney Coleman (13), Lindsey Wilson (34)
- 2004 Cleveland Dispersal Draft: selection traded
- 2004: Lindsay Whalen (4), Jessica Brungo (16), Ugo Oha (24), Candace Futrell (29)
- 2005: Katie Feenstra (8), Erin Phillips (21), Megan Mahoney (34)
- 2006: Debbie Merrill (28), Marita Payne (42)
- 2007 Charlotte Dispersal Draft: selection waived
- 2007: Kamesha Hairston (12), Sandrine Gruda (13), Cori Chambers (26), Kiera Hardy (39)
- 2008: Amber Holt (9), Ketia Swanier (12), Jolene Anderson (23), Lauren Ervin (37)
- 2009 Houston Dispersal Draft: selection waived
- 2009: Chante Black (10), Lyndra Littles (17), Alba Torrens (36)
- 2010 Sacramento Dispersal Draft: DeMya Walker (3)
- 2010: Tina Charles (1), Danielle McCray (7), Allison Hightower (15), Johannah Leedham (27)
- 2011: Sydney Colson (16), Adrienne Johnson (28)
- 2012: Astan Dabo (9), Chay Shegog (21)
- 2013: Kelly Faris (11), Anna Prins (23), Andrea Smith (35)
- 2014: Chiney Ogwumike (1), Chelsea Gray (11), DeNesha Stallworth (25)
- 2015: Elizabeth Williams (4), Brittany Hrynko (19)
- 2016: Morgan Tuck (3), Rachel Banham (4), Jamie Weisner (17), Aliyyah Handford (27)
- 2017: Brionna Jones (8), Shayla Cooper (13), Leticia Romero (16), Jessica January (28)
- 2018: Lexie Brown (9), Mikayla Cowling (33)
- 2019: Kristine Anigwe (9), Bridget Carleton (21), Regan Magarity (33)
- 2020: Kaila Charles (23), Juicy Landrum(35)
- 2021: DiJonai Carrington (20), Micaela Kelly (21), Aleah Goodman (30)
- 2022: Nia Clouden (12), Jordan Lewis (24), Kiara Smith (36)
- 2023: Alexis Morris (22), Ashten Prechtel (34)
- 2024: Leïla Lacan (10), Taiyanna Jackson (19), Helena Pueyo (22), Abbey Hsu (34)
- 2025: Aneesah Morrow (7), Saniya Rivers (8), Rayah Marshall (25)
- 2026: Nell Angloma (33), Gianna Kneepkens (5), Charlisse Leger-Walker (4)

== Franchise records and player accolades ==
=== Franchise leaders ===
- Games played: Nykesha Sales (278)
- Consecutive games played: Nykesha Sales (248, 6/10/99-7/6/06)
- Minutes: Nykesha Sales (8,762)
- Minutes per game: Shannon Johnson (34.0)
- Points: Nykesha Sales (3,955)
- Points per game: Tina Charles (18.0)
- Consecutive games scoring: Taj McWilliams-Franklin (243, 6/10/99-8/13/06)
- Field goal % (minimum 100): Margo Dydek (462–1,032, .503)
- Three point % (minimum 50): Kara Lawson (140–345, .409)
- Free throw % (minimum 100): Kara Lawson (164–182, .900)
- Rebounds: Taj McWilliams-Franklin (1,814)
- Rebounds per game: Tina Charles (11.7)
- Assists: Lindsay Whalen (808)
- Assists per game: Lindsay Whalen (5.0)
- Steals: Nykesha Sales (490)
- Steals per game: Nykesha Sales (1.76)
- Blocks: Taj McWilliams-Franklin (267)
- Blocks per game: Margo Dydek (2.26)
- Personal fouls: Nykesha Sales (798)
- Turnovers: Nykesha Sales (578)

=== Individual honors ===
WNBA Most Valuable Player

- Tina Charles – 2012
- Jonquel Jones – 2021

All–WNBA First Team

- Katie Douglas – 2006
- Lindsay Whalen – 2008
- Tina Charles – 2011, 2012
- Jonquel Jones – 2021
- Alyssa Thomas – 2023, 2024

All–WNBA Second Team

- Shannon Johnson – 1999, 2000, 2002
- Nykesha Sales – 2004
- Taj McWilliams-Franklin – 2005, 2006
- Katie Douglas – 2007
- Asjha Jones – 2008
- Tina Charles – 2010, 2013
- Jonquel Jones – 2017, 2019, 2022
- DeWanna Bonner – 2020
- Alyssa Thomas – 2022

WNBA All–Star Game MVP

- Katie Douglas – 2006

WNBA Most Improved Player

- Wendy Palmer – 2004
- Kelsey Bone – 2015
- Jonquel Jones – 2017
- Brionna Jones – 2021
- DiJonai Carrington – 2024

WNBA Sixth Woman of the Year

- Renee Montgomery – 2012
- Jonquel Jones – 2018
- Brionna Jones – 2022

WNBA Coach of the Year

- Mike Thibault – 2006, 2008
- Curt Miller – 2017, 2021
- Stephanie White – 2023

WNBA Basketball Executive of the Year

- Curt Miller – 2017

WNBA All–Defensive First Team

- Katie Douglas – 2005, 2006, 2007
- Jasmine Thomas – 2017, 2018, 2019
- Jonquel Jones – 2019, 2021
- Alyssa Thomas – 2020, 2023, 2024
- Briann January – 2021
- DiJonai Carrington – 2024

WNBA All–Defensive Second Team

- Taj McWilliams-Franklin – 2005
- Margo Dydek – 2006, 2007
- Tina Charles – 2011, 2012
- Jasmine Thomas – 2016, 2021
- Alyssa Thomas – 2017, 2019, 2022
- Brionna Jones – 2021
- Jonquel Jones – 2022

WNBA Rookie of the Year

- Tina Charles – 2010
- Chiney Ogwumike – 2014

WNBA All–Rookie Team

- Amber Holt – 2008
- Tina Charles – 2010
- Kelsey Griffin – 2010
- Chiney Ogwumike – 2014
- Alyssa Thomas – 2014

Kim Perrot Sportsmanship

- Taj McWilliams-Franklin – 2005
- Kara Lawson – 2012

WNBA Peak Performers

- Lindsay Whalen (Assists) – 2008
- Tina Charles (Rebounds) – 2010, 2011, 2012
- Jonquel Jones – 2017
- Alyssa Thomas (Rebounds) – 2023

=== All–Stars ===
- 1999: Shannon Johnson, Taj McWilliams-Franklin, Nykesha Sales
- 2000: Shannon Johnson, Taj McWilliams-Franklin, Nykesha Sales
- 2001: Taj McWilliams-Franklin, Nykesha Sales
- 2002: Shannon Johnson, Nykesha Sales
- 2003: Shannon Johnson, Nykesha Sales
- 2004: Taj McWilliams-Franklin, Nykesha Sales, Lindsay Whalen
- 2005: Taj McWilliams-Franklin, Nykesha Sales
- 2006: Katie Douglas, Margo Dydek, Taj McWilliams-Franklin, Nykesha Sales, Lindsay Whalen
- 2007: Katie Douglas, Asjha Jones
- 2008: No All-Star Game
- 2009: Asjha Jones
- 2010: Tina Charles, Renee Montgomery
- 2011: Tina Charles, Renee Montgomery
- 2012: No All-Star Game
- 2013: Tina Charles, Allison Hightower
- 2014: Katie Douglas, Chiney Ogwumike
- 2015: Alex Bentley, Kelsey Bone
- 2016: No All-Star Game
- 2017: Jasmine Thomas, Jonquel Jones, Alyssa Thomas
- 2018: Chiney Ogwumike
- 2019: Jonquel Jones, Alyssa Thomas
- 2020: No All-Star Game
- 2021: DeWanna Bonner, Brionna Jones, Jonquel Jones
- 2022: Brionna Jones, Jonquel Jones, Alyssa Thomas
- 2023: Alyssa Thomas, DeWanna Bonner
- 2024: DeWanna Bonner, Brionna Jones, Alyssa Thomas

=== Olympians ===
- 2008: Erin Phillips (AUS)
- 2012: Tina Charles (USA)
- 2016: Asjha Jones (USA)
- 2024: Alyssa Thomas (USA)
