= 1999 WNBA expansion draft =

2nd WNBA expansion draft

General information
- Sport: Basketball
- Date: April 6, 1999

Overview
- League: WNBA
- Expansion teams: Minnesota Lynx; Orlando Miracle

The Women's National Basketball Association (WNBA) held their second expansion draft on April 6, 1999, for the Minnesota Lynx and the Orlando Miracle. This draft allowed the two new expansion teams to select players from the existing WNBA teams to fill their debut rosters prior to the start of the 1999 WNBA season.

In December 1998, the American Basketball League (ABL) folded. The 90 players from the ABL's eight teams (except Kristin Folkl and Nykesha Sales who were allocated to the new WNBA expansion teams by the WNBA) were eligible for the 1999 WNBA draft.

== Key ==
Pos.	G	F	C
Position	Guard	Forward	Center

!	Denotes player who has been inducted to the Naismith Basketball Hall of Fame
^	Denotes player who has been inducted to the Women's Basketball Hall of Fame
*	Denotes player who has been selected for at least one All-Star Game and All-WNBA Team
^{+}	Denotes player who has been selected for at least one All-Star Game

== Initial player allocation ==
Prior to the expansion draft, the WNBA allocated two players to the Minnesota Lynx and the Orlando Miracle on September 15, 1998, in no particular order.

Pick	Player	Position	Nationality	Team	School / club team	WNBA years (Note: Number of years played in the WNBA prior to the draft)	Career with the franchise (Note: Number of years played for expansion franchise that drafted player)	Ref.
1	Kristin Folkl	F	United States	Minnesota Lynx	Stanford Cardinal	0	1999–2000	
2	Nykesha Sales *	G/F	United States	Orlando Miracle	UConn Huskies	0	1999–2007	

== Expansion draft ==
The following players were drafted for the rosters of the Lynx and Miracle from the league's existing teams on April 6, 1999:

Pick	Player	Position	Nationality	New team	Former team	WNBA years	Career with the franchise	Ref.
1	Brandy Reed ^{+}	F	United States	Minnesota Lynx	Phoenix Mercury	1	1999	
2	Andrea Congreaves	F	United Kingdom	Orlando Miracle	Charlotte Sting	2	1999	
3	Kim Williams	G	United States	Minnesota Lynx	Utah Starzz	2	—	
4	Kisha Ford	G	United States	Orlando Miracle	New York Liberty	2	1999	
5	Octavia Blue	G	United States	Minnesota Lynx	Los Angeles Sparks	1	—	
6	Yolanda Moore	F	United States	Orlando Miracle	Houston Comets	2	1999	
7	Adia Barnes	F	United States	Minnesota Lynx	Sacramento Monarchs	1	1999	
8	Adrienne Johnson	G	United States	Orlando Miracle	Cleveland Rockers	2	1999–2000; 2002–2003	
9	No selection (Note: Players from the rosters of the Detroit Shock and Washington Mystics were ineligible to be drafted.)	—	—	—	Detroit Shock	—	—	
10	No selection	—	—	—	Washington Mystics	—	—	

== Post-expansion draft player allocation ==
After the expansion draft, the WNBA allocated an additional two players to the Minnesota Lynx and the Orlando Miracle on May 3, 1999.

Pick	Player	Position	Nationality	New team	Former team	WNBA years	Career with the franchise	Ref.
1	Katie Smith * ^ !	G/F	United States	Minnesota Lynx	Columbus Quest (ABL)	0	1999–2005	
2	Shannon Johnson *	G	United States	Orlando Miracle	Columbus Quest (ABL)	0	1999–2003	
