= Carolyn Peck =

American basketball player, coach, sports broadcaster

Personal information
- Born: January 22, 1966 (age 60) Jefferson City, Tennessee, U.S.
- Listed height: 6 ft 4 in (1.93 m)

Career information
- College: Vanderbilt (1985–1988)
- Position: Center
- Coaching career: 1993–2007, 2016–2018

Career history

Coaching
- 1993–1995: Tennessee (assistant)
- 1995–1996: Kentucky (assistant)
- 1996–1997: Purdue (assistant)
- 1997–1999: Purdue
- 1999–2001: Orlando Miracle
- 2002–2007: Florida
- 2016–2018: Vanderbilt (associate HC)

Career highlights
- NCAA champion (1999); Big Ten regular season (1999); 2 Big Ten tournament (1998, 1999)

Career coaching record
- WNBA: 44–52 (.458)
- NCAA: 129–87 (.597)
- Women's Basketball Hall of Fame
Medals
Women's basketball
Assistant coach for United States
William Jones Cup
Silver medal – second place	1997 Taipei	Team competition

Carolyn Arlene Peck (born January 22, 1966) is an American television sportscaster and former college basketball coach. She was the head coach for the women's basketball teams of Purdue University and the University of Florida, and also the first head coach-general manager in the history of the WNBA's Orlando Miracle. Peck was also an associate head coach for her alma mater, Vanderbilt University.

== Early life ==
Carolyn Peck was born in Jefferson City, Tennessee. She has praised her family as her biggest influence, saying they showed her the importance of supporting each other. Peck says her mom and grandmothers taught her to work hard and appreciate life and family. Her brother Michael also became a basketball coach, and Peck hired him as her assistant coach for the Orlando Miracle in 2001. He is currently a coaching consultant.

== Basketball career ==
As a senior at Jefferson County High School in Dandridge, Tennessee, Peck, a 6-4 center, was named Tennessee's Miss Basketball after averaging 35 points and 13.2 rebounds per game. She played college basketball at Vanderbilt University from 1985 to 1988, averaging 10.6 points and 5.8 rebounds per game. She also blocked 180 shots, to break a Vanderbilt women's basketball career record. She was team captain for her last two seasons.

Peck graduated from Vanderbilt with a Bachelor of Arts degree in communications in 1988. She passed up an opportunity to play professionally in Spain to work as a marketing consultant at a Nashville television station, as well as sell pharmaceutical products for a Fortune 500 company for two years.

Peck returned to basketball in 1991, quitting her job to play professionally in Italy for three weeks, then for Japan’s Nippondenso Corporation for two years. During her second year in Japan, her team won the league championship. She was third in the league for rebounding in 1991 and 1992.

== Coaching career ==
=== Assistant coach ===
Peck's coaching career began in 1993. She returned to her home state to serve as an assistant coach for the Tennessee Lady Vols under coach Pat Summitt for two seasons. The Lady Vols posted 30-win seasons and won the Southeastern Conference championship during both seasons: 31–2 in 1993–94, and 34–3 in 1994–95. The latter team lost to the undefeated, Rebecca Lobo-led Connecticut Huskies in the NCAA Championship game, the school's and head coach Geno Auriemma's first national championship.

Peck went on to serve as an assistant coach at the University of Kentucky during the 1995–96 season. After this season, she received another assistant coaching job, this time at Purdue University under Nell Fortner, who had just replaced the fired Lin Dunn. The Boilermakers finished 17–11 during the 1996–97 season and advanced to the second round of the NCAA tournament. At the end of this season, Fortner was offered the position of head coach of the USA Women's basketball team for the 2000 Summer Olympics and was leaving Purdue. She handed over the reins of head coach to Peck, who became Purdue's third head coach in as many seasons. After time as a head coach and in broadcasting, in 2016 Peck joined Vanderbilt's women's basketball team as an associate head coach under Stephanie White.

==== USA Basketball ====
Peck served as the assistant coach, under head coach Gail Goestenkors, for the USA representative to the 1997 William Jones Cup competition. The event was held in Taipei, Taiwan during August 1997. The USA team won their first six games. Four of the six were decided by six points or fewer, including the semifinal game against Japan which went to overtime. In the gold medal game, the USA faced undefeated South Korea. The USA team played to a six-point margin early in the second half, but could not extend the margin. South Korea came back, took the lead, and held on to win the championship and the gold medal 76–71.

=== Head coach ===
==== Purdue University ====
During Peck's first season as head coach (1997–98), Purdue went 23–10 with an Elite Eight appearance. She became the third coach for Purdue's women's basketball team to accomplish an Elite Eight appearance in her first season as head coach. Things appeared to be looking up for the following season; the bulk of the team was returning.

Meanwhile, in April 1998 the young WNBA announced that it was expanding from ten teams to twelve, with one of the new franchises to be based in Orlando, Florida. Pat Williams, senior executive vice president of the Orlando team-to-be, began his search to find a head coach–general manager. The original list of prospects had six candidates, including Summitt, Duke's Goestenkors and Florida's Carol Ross. After all six candidates turned down the offer, Williams then called Peck upon the recommendation of both Ross and Goestenkors. In June 1998 Peck accepted the job with a four-year contract.

Despite accepting this new role, Peck was faced with a dilemma: having to return to Purdue to tell her team that they would once again have to play under a new coach. After she broke the news, some of her players felt betrayed and angry, some of them even telling her so personally. So after struggling with the idea of leaving Purdue after just one season as their coach, Peck again called Williams, asking him if she could remain at Purdue for the 1998–99 season and then go to Orlando for the start of the WNBA season. He granted her request.

In July it was announced that Peck would be the first head coach and general manager of the Orlando team (now named the Miracle), and coach at Purdue for one last season.

The friction between Peck and her players eased, after the team took a preseason trip to Switzerland and France for exhibition games. By the start of the season, the team was together, and Peck would neither discuss the fact that she was leaving nor answer any questions about Orlando.

The Purdue Boilermakers opened their 1998–1999 season by upsetting the Lady Vols and ending their 46-game winning streak. The Lady Vols had been the top-ranked team and three-time defending NCAA champions. Led by Katie Douglas, Stephanie White and Ukari Figgs, the Boilermakers posted a 28–1 record during the regular season, the lone loss coming by one point against Stanford. The team won the 1999 NCAA Division I women's basketball tournament, which was the first national championship in Purdue women's basketball history, winning all six of its games by at least 10 points, including a 62–45 victory over Duke in the title game.

Peck became the first African American to coach a women's Division I basketball national championship team; she has since been joined by Dawn Staley, who coached South Carolina to the 2017 National Championship. Peck was named Women's Basketball Coach of the Year by the Associated Press, as well as becoming the first woman and the first African American to win the Winged Foot Award (which honored the best coach in college basketball) from the New York Athletic Club. Two weeks after guiding Purdue to the title, Peck was in Orlando preparing the Miracle for their upcoming season.

Peck was awarded the US Basketball Writers Association (USBWA) Coach of the Year, the WBCA Coach of the Year, the AP College Basketball Coach of the Year and the Naismith College Coach of the Year awards in 1999.

The title was the first one in women's college basketball by a Big Ten Conference school.

==== Orlando Miracle ====
Peck started as the Orlando Miracle's head coach on April 1, 1999, after the end of the Boilermaker's championship season. She stated that it was difficult to assemble a team from scratch, and spent the first season focusing on building unity between the players. The team's first season had a record of 15–17, tying for second place in the Eastern Conference, and was one game away from qualifying for the playoffs. Peck became ESPN's expert guest analyst for the playoffs that year.

During Peck's three seasons as WNBA coach, the Miracle, which featured Shannon Johnson, Taj McWilliams-Franklin, Nykesha Sales and fellow Vanderbilt graduate Sheri Sam, posted a 44–52 record. They qualified for the playoffs in 2000, where they lost to the Cleveland Rockers 2 games to 1. This was the first time a WNBA team reached the playoffs so quickly after their formation, and the team was the first non-charter WNBA team to win a playoff game.

In 2000, Peck coached the WNBA On Tour Eastern Team, which played exhibition games in non-WNBA cities. In 2001, Peck hired her brother Michael as an assistant coach for the Miracle, and they became the first brother-sister coaching team for the WNBA.

==== University of Florida ====
On April 3, 2002, Peck returned to coaching college basketball, this time succeeding Ross as head coach of the Florida Gators women's basketball team. Peck's younger brother Michael again served as her assistant coach.

During her five seasons at Florida (2002–03 through 2006–07), the Gators posted a 72–75 record with two NCAA tournament berths. The 2003–04 team, which posted a 19–11 record after going 9–19 the season before, was eliminated by Baylor in the second round of the 2004 NCAA tournament, after defeating New Mexico in the first round before 16,029 fans at Albuquerque. The 2005–06 team posted a 21–7 record and received a No. 6 seed in the NCAA tournament, but this time New Mexico got revenge on Florida, defeating them by 24 points in the first round.

The 2006–07 season was a disaster—the Gators suffered through a 14-game losing streak and finished 9–22. Following the losing streak, the university fired Peck in February but allowed her to finish the season as coach. Former Florida Gators player Amanda Butler replaced Peck for the 2007–08 season.

== Analyst career ==
Peck was not out of basketball for long after the 2006–07 season: ESPN hired her as a basketball analyst within months.

After 9 years of working for ESPN, Peck was hired by her alma mater (Vanderbilt) to be an assistant coach in June 2016. After the 2017–18 season, Peck stepped down from coaching to return to ESPN.

Peck has commented on the gendered expectations of women athletes and the growing recognition of women's basketball as a sport and not just a "women's sport."

== Head coaching record ==
=== College ===
Record table
Season	Team	Overall	Conference	Standing	Postseason
Purdue Boilermakers (Big Ten) (1997–1999)
1997–98	Purdue	23–10	10–6	T-3rd	NCAA Elite Eight
1998–99	Purdue	34–1	16–0	1st	NCAA Champions
Purdue:		57–11 (.838)	26–6 (.813)		
Florida Gators (SEC) (2002–2007)
2002–03	Florida	9–19	1–13	T–11th	
2003–04	Florida	19–11	8–6	T-4th	NCAA second round
2004–05	Florida	14–15	5–9	8th	WNIT First Round
2005–06	Florida	21–9	8–6	T-5th	NCAA first round
2006–07	Florida	9–22	2–12	11th	
Florida:		72–76 (.486)	24–46 (.343)		
Total:		129–87 (.597)			
National champion Postseason invitational champion Conference regular season champion Conference regular season and conference tournament champion Division regular season champion Division regular season and conference tournament champion Conference tournament champion

=== WNBA ===
Legend
Regular season	G	Games coached	W	Games won	L	Games lost	W–L %	Win–loss %
Playoffs	PG	Playoff games	PW	Playoff wins	PL	Playoff losses	PW–L %	Playoff win–loss %

Team	Year	G	W	L	W–L%	Finish	PG	PW	PL	PW–L%	Result
Orlando	1999	32	15	17	.469	4th in East	-	-	-	-	Missed Playoffs
Orlando	2000	32	16	16	.500	3rd in East	3	1	2	.333	Lost Eastern Conference Semi-Finals
Orlando	2001	32	13	19	.406	5th in East	-	-	-	-	Missed Playoffs
Career		96	44	52	.458		3	1	2	.333	
