= Jessie Hicks =

American basketball player (born 1971)

Personal information
- Born: December 2, 1971 (age 54)
- Listed height: 6 ft 4 in (1.93 m)
- Listed weight: 187 lb (85 kg)

Career information
- College: Maryland (1989–1993)
- WNBA draft: 1997: 2nd round, 12th overall pick
- Drafted by: Utah Starzz
- Playing career: 1997–2004
- Position: Forward / center

Career history
- 1997: Utah Starzz
- 2000–2002: Orlando Miracle
- 2003: Connecticut Sun
- 2004: San Antonio Stars

Career highlights
- 2× First-team All-ACC (1992, 1993)
- Stats at Basketball Reference

Jessie Hicks (born December 2, 1971) is an American former professional basketball player. She was chosen to be a member of the 2013 ACC Women's Basketball Tournament Legends Roster, a class of 12 former student-athletes who represent three decades of basketball.

== Professional career ==
Hicks was selected with the 12th overall pick in the 1997 WNBA draft by the Utah Starzz. In her debut game on June 21, 1997, Hicks played for four and a half minutes and recorded only one rebound as a statistic as the Starzz fell to the Sacramento Monarchs 61 - 73. She would only play for the Starzz her rookie year, averaging 3.2 points and 1.4 rebounds in 10 minutes per game.

=== Pregnancy and fight back into the WNBA ===
At the end of her rookie season, Hicks would discover that she was pregnant. She would be placed on the injury reserve list for the Starzz as she recovered from giving birth to her son, Jamon Emmanuel Hicks. She was eventually waived by the Starzz on April 30, 1999. Hicks has spoken publicly about her pregnancy, the challenges of recovery, and her determination to return to the league afterwards. Saying, "The doctor gives you six weeks to get your body back to normal. I didn't recover like that. Three months it took me. And I'd gained a lot of weight—60 pounds. But I had the desire to get back into shape."

Hicks would not return to the WNBA until the spring of 2000 (2 and a half years after the final game of her rookie season), when she signed to the Orlando Miracle's training camp and made the final roster going into the 2000 season. As an appreciation token for her drive and determination to return to the league, she started for the Miracle in their season opener on May 31, 2000. However, this would be her only game that year where she was a starter, as the Miracle decided to start Cíntia Santos and Taj McWilliams-Franklin at the center and power forward positions for every other game of the season. She would play for the Miracle for four years (in the fourth year, the Miracle moved to Connecticut and became the Connecticut Sun with her most productive one being her third year, averaging 6.1 points and 3.3 rebounds per game. The fourth year (as a member of the now Sun) would be the only time Hicks would make the playoffs in her career, but the Sun were swept in the Eastern Conference Finals by the Detroit Shock.

After the 2003 season ended, Hicks signed as a free agent with the San Antonio Silver Stars on February 4, 2004. In 27 games for the Silver Stars (starting in 10 of them), Hicks averaged 13.7 minutes per game along with 4.7 points and 2.1 rebounds as the Stars finished with the worst record in the league (9-25).

Because the Stars missed the playoffs, Hicks final WNBA game ever ended up being the last regular season game of the Stars' schedule that year on September 17, 2004. On that day, the Stars defeated the Charlotte Sting 82 - 65 with Hicks recording 2 points, 4 rebounds a 1 block in her final game.

== Personal life ==
Hicks earned a degree in criminal justice in 1993. She later earned a master's of education in guidance and counseling. She has two children.

== Career statistics ==
Legend
GP	Games played	GS	Games started	MPG	Minutes per game	RPG	Rebounds per game
APG	Assists per game	SPG	Steals per game	BPG	Blocks per game	PPG	Points per game
TO	Turnovers per game	FG%	Field-goal percentage	3P%	3-point field-goal percentage	FT%	Free-throw percentage
**Bold**	Career best	°	League leader

=== Regular season ===
Year	Team	GP	GS	MPG	FG%	3P%	FT%	RPG	APG	SPG	BPG	TO	PPG
1997	Utah	26	0	10.1	.463	.000	.563	1.4	.4	.5	.4	**.5**	3.2
2000	Orlando	26	1	6.0	.4835	–	.621	1.0	.2	.1	.3	.7	1.5
2001	Orlando	**32**°	5	14.3	.389	–	.652	2.9	**.7**	**.7**	.5	1.7	5.3
2002	Orlando	31	6	**15.2**	**.477**	–	.698	**3.3**	**.7**	.6	**.8**	1.6	**6.1**
2003	Connecticut	27	0	9.4	.463	–	**.960**	1.8	.2	.4	.3	1.0	3.6
2004	San Antonio	27	**10**	13.7	**.468**	–	.605	2.1	.7	.6	.5	1.3	4.7
Career	6 years, 2 teams	169	22	11.7	.447	.000	.679	2.1	.5	.5	.5	1.1	4.2

=== Playoffs ===
Year	Team	GP	GS	MPG	FG%	3P%	FT%	RPG	APG	SPG	BPG	TO	PPG
2003	Connecticut	4	0	6.8	.625	–	–	1.5	.3	.0	.3	.5	2.5
