= Carla McGhee =

American basketball player (born 1968)

Personal information
- Born: March 6, 1968 (age 58) Peoria, Illinois, U.S.
- Listed height: 6 ft 3 in (1.91 m)

Career information
- High school: Manual (Peoria, Illinois)
- College: Tennessee
- WNBA draft: 1999: 4th round, 44th overall pick
- Drafted by: Orlando Miracle

Career history
- 1999–2002: Orlando Miracle

Career highlights
- NCAA champion (1987, 1989)
- Stats at Basketball Reference
Medals
Women's basketball
Representing the United States
Olympic Games
Gold medal – first place	1996 Atlanta	Team competition
World Championship
Bronze medal – third place	1994 Sydney	Team competition
Jones Cup
Gold medal – first place	1987 Taipei	Team competition
Goodwill Games
Gold medal – first place	1994 St. Petersburg	Team competition

Carla Renee McGhee (born March 6, 1968) is an American former basketball player most notable for her career at the University of Tennessee. She was injured in a car crash in October 1987 and was in a coma for 47 hours, suffering brain injuries and breaking nearly every bone in her face. She was told she'd never play again. She was a member of the gold medal-winning 1996 Olympic Team, and was inducted into the Naismith Basketball Hall of Fame as a member of the team in 2026.

As a member of the Tennessee Lady Volunteers, McGhee won two national championships at Tennessee (1987 and 1989) in three-tournament appearances. She averaged 6.1 points per game and 5.1 rebounds per game for her collegiate career. She was named to the 1987 Tennessean All-Freshman team.

She played one season in the ABL for the Atlanta Glory, averaging 8.2 points per game and 5.3 rebounds per game in 26 games. She has played six pro seasons abroad in Germany (1990–91, 1998), Spain (1991–93) and Italy (1993–95). McGhee was a Spanish League and Spanish/Italian League All-Star in 1993.

She played for the Orlando Miracle in the WNBA from 1999 to 2002.

== USA Basketball ==
McGhee was named to the team representing the US at the William Jones Cup competition in Taipei, Taiwan in July 1987. The team won all seven games to win the gold medal for the event. The USA was down at halftime in the opening game against Japan, but came back in the second half to win, helped by 15 points from Campbell. McGhee averaged 7.4 points per game over the seven games.

McGhee was selected to be a member of the USA team invited to the 1994 World Championships. The preliminary rounds were held in Hobart, Tasmania while the final rounds were in Sydney, Australia. The USA team won their first six games before playing Brazil in the semi-final match up. Brazil's Hortência Marcari had a great game scoring 32 points, and the final score of 110–107 favored the Brazilian team. The USA team regrouped to beat the host Australia team 100–95 to take home the bronze medal. McGhee averaged 5.3 points per game.

McGhee was selected to represent the US at the 1995 Pan American Games. However, only four teams committed to participate in the women's basketball competition, so that event was cancelled.

McGhee's final event as a member of the USA team was the 1996 Summer Olympics, held in Atlanta, Georgia, USA. The USA team won all their pool play games by large margins, although they were behind Cuba by as much as seven points before Lisa Leslie's 24 points, helped the USA take over the game. The USA victory over Australia featured a record setting 15 assists by Teresa Edwards, while Johnson was the leading scorer with 24 points. Against Japan, Lisa Leslie set a USA Olympic scoring record with 35 points. In the final, the USA team faced 7–0 Brazil—a team that had beaten the USA squad in the 1991 Pan Am games and the 1994 World Championships. This time, playing before a home crowd of 32,987, the USA team started out very strong, hitting 71.9 per cent of their field goals leading to an eleven points margin at the half. The USA team scored the first eight points of the second half and won the gold medal 111–87. McGhee averaged 3.1 points per game.

== Career statistics ==
=== WNBA ===
Legend
GP	Games played	GS	Games started	MPG	Minutes per game	RPG	Rebounds per game
APG	Assists per game	SPG	Steals per game	BPG	Blocks per game	PPG	Points per game
TO	Turnovers per game	FG%	Field-goal percentage	3P%	3-point field-goal percentage	FT%	Free-throw percentage
**Bold**	Career best	°	League leader

==== Regular season ====
Year	Team	GP	GS	MPG	FG%	3P%	FT%	RPG	APG	SPG	BPG	TO	PPG
1999	Orlando	30	0	7.8	31.9	0.0	83.3	1.5	0.3	0.3	0.1	0.7	1.5
2000	Orlando	32	0	12.8	36.1	0.0	69.2	2.0	0.7	0.7	0.2	1.0	2.7
2001	Orlando	17	0	4.2	25.0	0.0	50.0	0.6	0.0	0.1	0.1	0.4	0.8
2002	Orlando	2	0	2.0	50.0	0.0	100.0	0.5	0.0	0.0	0.0	0.0	2.5
Career	4 years, 1 team	81	0	8.9	33.5	0.0	72.6	1.5	0.4	0.4	0.1	0.7	1.9

==== Playoffs ====
Year	Team	GP	GS	MPG	FG%	3P%	FT%	RPG	APG	SPG	BPG	TO	PPG
2000	Orlando	3	0	12.3	14.3	0.0	100.0	1.7	0.3	1.3	0.0	1.0	1.7
Career	1 year, 1 team	3	0	12.3	14.3	0.0	100.0	1.7	0.3	1.3	0.0	1.0	1.7

=== College ===
Year	Team	GP	GS	MPG	FG%	3P%	FT%	RPG	APG	SPG	BPG	TO	PPG
1988–89	Tennessee	**37**	-	-	**52.8**	0.0	50.6	5.4	1.2	1.3	0.3	-	5.3
1989–90	Tennessee	30	-	-	48.4	0.0	**69.0**	**6.8**	**2.1**	**1.7**	**0.5**	-	**9.0**
**Career**		67	-	-	50.1	0.0	59.8	6.0	1.6	1.5	0.4	-	6.9
Statistics retrieved from Sports-Reference.
