= Adrienne Johnson (basketball, born 1974) =

American basketball player (born 1974)

Personal information
- Born: February 5, 1974 (age 52) Louisville, Kentucky, U.S.
- Listed height: 5 ft 10 in (1.78 m)

Career information
- High school: Butler Traditional (Louisville, Kentucky)
- College: Ohio State (1992–1996)
- WNBA draft: 1997: undrafted
- Position: Guard

Career history
- 1997–1998: Cleveland Rockers
- 1999–2002: Orlando Miracle
- 2003: Connecticut Sun
- Stats at WNBA.com
- Stats at Basketball Reference

Adrienne Lynn Johnson (born February 5, 1974) is a former professional basketball player who spent eight seasons in the WNBA.

== College ==
Johnson compiled over 1000 total points and averaged 13.0 points and 3.1 assists her senior year.

== WNBA ==
During the 1999 expansion draft on April 6, 1999, Johnson was selected by the Orlando Miracle.

She compiled 1018 points, 292 rebounds, and 132 assists in her eight seasons in the WNBA. She retired in 2005.

== Jobs after playing career ==
=== University of Louisville ===
- Women's basketball program's executive director for player relations
- Athletic department's outreach coordinator (six years)
- Analyst for the Louisville women's basketball radio broadcasts

== Awards and honors ==
=== College ===
- All-Big Ten honors (1996)

=== WNBA ===
- WNBA's first Hometown Hero Award (2000)

== Career statistics ==
Legend
GP	Games played	GS	Games started	MPG	Minutes per game	RPG	Rebounds per game
APG	Assists per game	SPG	Steals per game	BPG	Blocks per game	PPG	Points per game
TO	Turnovers per game	FG%	Field-goal percentage	3P%	3-point field-goal percentage	FT%	Free-throw percentage
**Bold**	Career best	°	League leader

=== WNBA ===
==== Regular season ====
Year	Team	GP	GS	MPG	FG%	3P%	FT%	RPG	APG	SPG	BPG	TO	PPG
1997	Cleveland	25	0	7.8	37.9	**50.0**	77.8	0.9	0.4	0.2	0.0	1.1	2.1
1998	Cleveland	29	0	11.4	**45.7**	42.4	72.2	1.7	0.5	0.2	**0.1**	0.8	4.6
1999	Orlando	29	0	7.7	40.3	12.5	66.7	1.0	0.5	0.2	**0.1**	**0.5**	2.0
2000	Orlando	32	**31**	**34.4**	44.5	35.1	**89.5**	**2.8**	**1.7**	**0.8**	**0.1**	1.8	**13.6**
2001	Did not play (injury)												
2002	Orlando	32	2	18.8	37.6	29.5	70.6	1.4	0.7	0.5	**0.1**	0.8	5.2
2003	Connecticut	**34**	5	17.2	35.4	34.7	75.0	1.7	0.5	0.5	0.0	0.6	5.1
Career	6 years, 3 teams	181	38	16.8	41.0	34.3	78.3	1.6	0.7	0.4	0.1	0.9	5.6

==== Playoffs ====
Year	Team	GP	GS	MPG	FG%	3P%	FT%	RPG	APG	SPG	BPG	TO	PPG
1998	Cleveland	2	0	6.0	0.0	0.0	0.0	**1.5**	0.0	**0.5**	0.0	**0.0**	0.0
2000	Orlando	**3**	**3**	**37.0**	33.3	**30.0**	**75.0**	1.3	**2.7**	0.3	**0.3**	2.3	**11.3**
2003	Connecticut	**3**	0	14.3	**66.7**	0.0	0.0	1.3	1.3	0.3	0.0	**0.0**	4.0
Career	3 years, 3 teams	8	3	20.8	37.0	23.1	75.0	1.4	1.5	0.4	0.1	0.9	5.8

=== College ===
Year	Team	GP	GS	MPG	FG%	3P%	FT%	RPG	APG	SPG	BPG	TO	PPG
1992–93	Ohio State	30	-	-	39.5	20.0	60.9	1.6	0.8	0.5	0.1	-	4.4
1993–94	Ohio State	28	-	-	40.3	**31.9**	**83.7**	3.3	1.8	0.8	0.1	-	10.7
1994–95	Ohio State	20	-	-	38.6	20.0	69.8	2.0	1.3	0.4	0.1	-	7.8
1995–96	Ohio State	**34**	-	-	**46.6**	26.5	78.1	**3.9**	**3.1**	**1.1**	0.1	-	**13.0**
**Career**		112	-	-	42.5	27.1	75.4	2.8	1.8	0.8	0.1	-	9.2
Statistics retrieved from Sports-Reference.

== Personal life ==
Johnson earned a bachelor's degree in exercise physiology from Ohio State University.
