= Jannon Roland =

American basketball player and coach

Personal information
- Born: February 3, 1975 (age 51) Springfield, Ohio, U.S.
- Listed height: 6 ft 1 in (1.85 m)

Career information
- High school: Urbana (Urbana, Ohio)
- College: Purdue (1993–1997)
- WNBA draft: 2000: 2nd round, 20th overall pick
- Drafted by: Orlando Miracle
- Position: Guard / forward
- Number: 42

Career history

Playing
- 2000: Orlando Miracle

Coaching
- 2007–20??: Saint Joseph's College

Career highlights
- Chicago Tribune Silver Basketball (1997)
- Stats at Basketball Reference
- Stats at Basketball Reference

Alma Jannon Roland (born February 3, 1975) (better known as Jannon Roland) is an American former professional basketball player who played for the Orlando Miracle of the WNBA.

== College ==
Roland was a member of the Big Ten Conference championship teams in 1994, 1995, and 1997. She returned to Purdue in 2003 to complete her degree in organization leadership and supervision.

=== Purdue statistics ===
Legend
GP	Games played	GS	Games started	MPG	Minutes per game
FG%	Field goal percentage	3P%	3-point field goal percentage	FT%	Free throw percentage
RPG	Rebounds per game	APG	Assists per game	SPG	Steals per game
BPG	Blocks per game	PPG	Points per game	**Bold**	Career high

Year	Team	GP	Points	FG%	3P%	FT%	RPG	APG	SPG	BPG	PPG
1993-94	Purdue	**32**	322	**50.2%**	**42.7%**	70.9%	3.2	2.2	0.9	0.3	10.1
1994-95	Purdue	**32**	388	43.4%	31.9%	70.7%	4.8	1.9	1.2	**0.5**	12.1
1995-96	Purdue	31	423	42.9%	38.1%	73.5%	4.0	**2.9**	1.4	0.4	13.6
1996-97	Purdue	28	**529**	46.1%	33.3%	**79.2%**	**7.2**	1.4	**1.7**	0.2	**18.9**
Career	Purdue	123	1662	45.3%	36.4%	74.6%	4.7	2.1	1.3	0.4	13.5

== Honors and awards ==
- Second team All-America honors from USA Today and Parade magazine
- 1993 Division II Player of the Year
- 1997 Big Ten player of the year
- 2x Division II state championshion (1992, 1993)
- Inducted into Ohio Basketball Hall of Fame
