= 1999 Orlando Miracle season =

- Head coach: Carolyn Peck
- Arena: TD Waterhouse Centre

Results
- Record: 15–17 (.469)
- Place: 4th (Eastern)
- Playoff finish: Did not qualify

The 1999 WNBA season was the Orlando Miracle's inaugural season. The Miracle tied for second place in the conference with the Detroit Shock and the Charlotte Sting. However, both Detroit and Charlotte beat Orlando in two of their three meetings during the regular season. Therefore, the Miracle were in fourth place and out of playoff contention.

== Transactions ==
=== WNBA expansion draft ===
Player	Nationality	Former WNBA Team
Andrea Congreaves	United Kingdom	Charlotte Sting
Kisha Ford	United States	New York Liberty
Yolanda Moore	United States	Houston Comets
Adrienne Johnson	United States	Cleveland Rockers

=== WNBA allocation draft ===
Player	Nationality	School/Team/Country
Nykesha Sales	United States	UConn
Shannon Johnson	United States	Columbus Quest

=== WNBA draft ===
Round	Pick	Player	Nationality	School/Team/Country
1	8	Tari Phillips	United States	Colorado Xplosion
2	20	Sheri Sam	United States	San Jose Lasers
3	32	Taj McWilliams-Franklin	United States	Philadelphia Rage
4	44	Carla McGhee	United States	Columbus Quest
4	50	Elaine Powell	United States	Portland Power

=== Transactions ===
Date	Transaction
April 6, 1999	Drafted Andrea Congreaves, Kisha Ford, Yolanda Moore and Adrienne Johnson in the 1999 WNBA expansion Draft
May 3, 1999	Drafted Nykesha Sales and Shannon Johnson in the 1999 WNBA Allocation Draft
May 4, 1999	Drafted Tari Phillips, Sheri Sam, Taj McWilliams-Franklin, Carla McGhee and Elaine Powell in the 1999 WNBA draft

== Roster ==
1999 Orlando Miracle roster
Players
Coaches

Pos.	No.	Nat.	Name	Height	Weight	DOB	From	Yrs
F/C	3	(United Kingdom)	Congreaves, Andrea	6' 2" (1.88m)	183 lb (83kg)	1970-06-03	Mercer	2
G/F	5	(United States)	Ford, Kisha	5' 10" (1.78m)	153 lb (69kg)	1975-04-04	Georgia Tech	2
G	31	(United States)	Johnson, Adrienne	5' 10" (1.78m)	154 lb (70kg)	1974-02-05	Ohio State	2
G	14	(United States)	Johnson, Shannon	5' 7" (1.7m)	152 lb (69kg)	1974-08-18	South Carolina	R
G	10	(United States)	McGhee, Carla	6' 1" (1.85m)	173 lb (78kg)	1968-03-06	Tennessee	R
F/C	11	(United States)	McWilliams-Franklin, Taj	6' 2" (1.88m)	195 lb (88kg)	1970-10-20	St. Edward's	R
F/C	33	(United States)	Moore, Yolanda	6' 0" (1.83m)	175 lb (79kg)	1974-07-01	Mississippi	2
F/C	24	(United States)	Phillips, Tari	6' 2" (1.88m)	200 lb (91kg)	1970-03-06	Central Florida	R
G	50	(United States)	Powell, Elaine	5' 8" (1.73m)	150 lb (68kg)	1975-08-09	LSU	R
G/F	42	(United States)	Sales, Nykesha	6' 0" (1.83m)	184 lb (83kg)	1976-05-10	Connecticut	R
G/F	55	(United States)	Sam, Sheri	6' 0" (1.83m)	160 lb (73kg)	1974-05-05	Vanderbilt	R
G	7	(United States)	Suber, Tora	5' 7" (1.7m)	137 lb (62kg)	1974-11-23	Virginia	2

Head coach
(United States) Carolyn Peck (Vanderbilt)
Assistant coaches
(United States) Charlene Thomas-Swinson
(United States) Rick Stukes

Legend

- (C) Team captain
- (DP) Unsigned draft pick
- (FA) Free agent
- (S) Suspended
- Injured

== Schedule ==
=== Regular season ===
1999 game log
Total: 15–17 (Home: 8–8; Road: 7–9)
June: 5–3 (Home: 3–1; Road: 2–2)

Game	Date	Team	Score	High points	High rebounds	High assists	Location Attendance	Record
1	June 10	Houston	L 63–77	Taj McWilliams-Franklin (15)	Taj McWilliams-Franklin (7)	Shannon Johnson (7)	TD Waterhouse Centre	0–1
2	June 12	@ Utah	L 65–71	Sheri Sam (21)	Sheri Sam (10)	Shannon Johnson (7)	Delta Center	0–2
3	June 15	Los Angeles	W 88–86	Nykesha Sales (29)	Andrea Congreaves (11)	Shannon Johnson (8)	TD Waterhouse Centre	1–2
4	June 17	@ Detroit	L 74–79	Shannon Johnson (22)	Taj McWilliams-Franklin (13)	McWilliams-Franklin; Sales (4)	The Palace of Auburn Hills	1–3
5	June 19	Washington	W 73–68	Shannon Johnson (18)	Taj McWilliams-Franklin (11)	Shannon Johnson (7)	TD Waterhouse Centre	2–3
6	June 21	Phoenix	W 80–76	Sales; Sam (20)	Taj McWilliams-Franklin (9)	Shannon Johnson (9)	TD Waterhouse Centre	3–3
7	June 22	@ Cleveland	W 71–62	Sheri Sam (22)	McWilliams-Franklin; Sales (7)	Nykesha Sales (6)	Gund Arena	4–3
8	June 28	@ Houston	W 68–66	Nykesha Sales (23)	Sheri Sam (6)	S. Johnson; Sales (6)	Compaq Center	5–3

July : 4–9 (Home: 1–6; Road: 3–3)

Game	Date	Team	Score	High points	High rebounds	High assists	Location Attendance	Record
9	July 3	Charlotte	L 58–75	Shannon Johnson (17)	Taj McWilliams-Franklin (11)	Shannon Johnson (4)	TD Waterhouse Centre	5–4
10	July 7	Minnesota	L 66–71	Sheri Sam (15)	McGhee; Sam (7)	Shannon Johnson (6)	TD Waterhouse Centre	5–5
11	July 9	@ Charlotte	W 66–61	Nykesha Sales (16)	S. Johnson; McWilliams-Franklin (5)	Shannon Johnson (4)	Charlotte Coliseum	6–5
12	July 10	Utah	W 62–56	Nykesha Sales (21)	Shannon Johnson (8)	Shannon Johnson (4)	TD Waterhouse Centre	7–5
13	July 12	Detroit	L 67–76	Congreaves; McWilliams-Franklin (14)	Taj McWilliams-Franklin (8)	S. Johnson; Sam (5)	TD Waterhouse Centre	7–6
14	July 16	Charlotte	L 50–56	Nykesha Sales (15)	Taj McWilliams-Franklin (6)	Shannon Johnson (3)	TD Waterhouse Centre	7–7
15	July 17	Sacramento	L 70–76	Nykesha Sales (20)	Taj McWilliams-Franklin (10)	Shannon Johnson (9)	TD Waterhouse Centre	7–8
16	July 19	@ Washington	W 77–52	Sheri Sam (20)	Shannon Johnson (4)	S. Johnson; Sales (4)	MCI Center	8–8
17	July 21	@ New York	L 56–61	Taj McWilliams-Franklin (13)	Shannon Johnson (7)	Sheri Sam (3)	Madison Square Garden	8–9
18	July 23	@ Phoenix	L 67–73	Shannon Johnson (22)	Sheri Sam (6)	Shannon Johnson (6)	America West Arena	8–10
19	July 24	@ Sacramento	W 73–64	Shannon Johnson (31)	Taj McWilliams-Franklin (10)	Shannon Johnson (5)	ARCO Arena	9–10
20	July 27	@ Los Angeles	L 60–81	Taj McWilliams-Franklin (17)	Taj McWilliams-Franklin (7)	Elaine Powell (4)	Great Western Forum	9–11
21	July 29	New York	L 52–56 (OT)	Shannon Johnson (25)	Taj McWilliams-Franklin (12)	Shannon Johnson (5)	TD Waterhouse Centre	9–12

August : 6–5 (Home: 4–1; Road: 2–4)

Game	Date	Team	Score	High points	High rebounds	High assists	Location Attendance	Record
22	August 1	@ New York	L 61–74	Nykesha Sales (21)	Nykesha Sales (8)	Congreaves; S. Johnson (3)	Madison Square Garden	9–13
23	August 4	Cleveland	W 70–62	Taj McWilliams-Franklin (16)	Taj McWilliams-Franklin (9)	S. Johnson (5)	TD Waterhouse Centre	10–13
24	August 5	@ Washington	L 68–72	Taj McWilliams-Franklin (24)	Taj McWilliams-Franklin (10)	Sheri Sam (7)	MCI Center	10–14
25	August 7	@ Charlotte	L 60–64	Shannon Johnson (25)	Taj McWilliams-Franklin (6)	Nykesha Sales (5)	Charlotte Coliseum	10–15
26	August 9	New York	L 75–80	Nykesha Sales (24)	McWilliams-Franklin; Sales (6)	Nykesha Sales (5)	TD Waterhouse Centre	10–16
27	August 12	Cleveland	W 55–54	Nykesha Sales (16)	Taj McWilliams-Franklin (15)	Nykesha Sales (5)	TD Waterhouse Centre	11–16
28	August 14	@ Cleveland	W 73–61	Nykesha Sales (17)	Shannon Johnson (6)	Shannon Johnson (8)	Gund Arena	12–16
29	August 16	Washington	W 81–54	Sheri Sam (19)	Taj McWilliams-Franklin (9)	Nykesha Sales (6)	TD Waterhouse Centre	13–16
30	August 18	Detroit	W 93–81	Taj McWilliams-Franklin (21)	Taj McWilliams-Franklin (13)	Elaine Powell (6)	TD Waterhouse Centre	14–16
31	August 20	@ Minnesota	W 83–80 (OT)	Shannon Johnson (20)	Taj McWilliams-Franklin (8)	Nykesha Sales (6)	Target Center	15–16
32	August 21	@ Detroit	L 68–74	Shannon Johnson (22)	Sheri Sam (7)	Elaine Powell (4)	The Palace of Auburn Hills	15–17

1999 season schedule

=== Season standings ===
Eastern Conference	W	L	PCT	Conf.	GB
New York Liberty ^{x}	18	14	.563	12–8	–
Detroit Shock ^{x}	15	17	.469	12–8	3.0
Charlotte Sting ^{x}	15	17	.469	12–8	3.0
Orlando Miracle ^{o}	15	17	.469	9–11	3.0
Washington Mystics ^{o}	12	20	.375	10–10	6.0
Cleveland Rockers ^{o}	7	25	.219	5–15	11.0

== Statistics ==
Legend
GP	Games played	GS	Games started	MPG	Minutes per game	RPG	Rebounds per game
APG	Assists per game	SPG	Steals per game	BPG	Blocks per game	PPG	Points per game
FG%	Field-goal percentage	3P%	3-point field-goal percentage	FT%	Free-throw percentage	TO	Turnovers per game
PF	Fouls per game		Team leader		League leader

=== Regular season ===
Player	GP	GS	MPG	FG%	3P%	FT%	RPG	APG	SPG	BPG	PPG
Shannon Johnson	32	32	35.8	.447	.364	.686	4.7	4.4	1.7	0.4	14.0
Sheri Sam	32	32	34.0	.388	.328	.688	4.6	2.4	1.3	0.3	11.4
Taj McWilliams-Franklin	32	32	32.6	.480	.444	.667	7.5	1.6	1.8	1.2	13.1
Nykesha Sales	32	32	32.5	.385	.330	.805	4.2	2.8	2.2	0.3	13.7
Andrea Congreaves	32	32	25.4	.500	.366	.830	3.2	1.1	0.8	0.2	6.5
Elaine Powell	18	0	14.2	.515	.111	.545	1.3	1.8	0.5	0.2	2.6
Tari Phillips	32	0	10.5	.406	.000	.481	2.1	0.3	0.6	0.3	4.1
Carla McGhee	30	0	7.8	.319	N/A	.833	1.5	0.3	0.3	0.1	1.5
Adrienne Johnson	29	0	7.7	.403	.125	.667	1.0	0.5	0.2	0.1	2.0
Kisha Ford	8	0	5.6	.200	.000	1.000	0.8	0.0	0.3	0.3	0.5
Yolanda Moore	23	0	5.0	.476	.000	.500	0.6	0.0	0.2	0.0	1.1
Tora Suber	25	0	4.6	.292	.111	.500	0.5	0.4	0.2	0.0	0.8

^{‡}Waived/Released during the season
^{†}Traded during the season
^{≠}Acquired during the season

- Shannon Johnson was tied for tenth in the WNBA in Three Point Field Goals with 40
- Taj McWilliams-Franklin ranked third in the WNBA in Three Point Field Goal Percentage, .444
- Nykesha Sales ranked eighth in the WNBA in Field Goal Attempts with 397
- Sheri Sam ranked sixth in the WNBA in Minutes Played with 1088
- Sheri Sam was tied for eighth in the WNBA in Three Point Field Goals with 41
- Sheri Sam ranked ninth in the WNBA in Three Point Field Goal Attempts with 125

== Awards and honors ==
- Shannon Johnson, Guard, Orlando Miracle, All-WNBA Second Team
- Shannon Johnson led the WNBA in Minutes Played with 1147
