= 2000 Orlando Miracle season =

- Head coach: Carolyn Peck
- Arena: TD Waterhouse Centre

Results
- Record: 16–16 (.500)
- Place: 3rd (Eastern)
- Playoff finish: Lost in Eastern Conference Semifinals

The 2000 WNBA season was their second in the league. The Miracle made to the playoffs for the first time in franchise history, only to lose to the Cleveland Rockers in three games.

== Transactions ==
=== Miami Sol expansion draft ===
The following players were selected in the Miami Sol expansion draft from the Orlando Miracle:

Player	Nationality	School/Team/Country
Yolanda Moore	United States	Ole Miss

=== Portland Fire expansion draft ===
The following players were selected in the Portland Fire expansion draft from the Orlando Miracle:

Player	Nationality	School/Team/Country
Tari Phillips	United States	UCF

=== WNBA draft ===
Round	Pick	Player	Nationality	School/Team/Country
1	4	Cíntia dos Santos	Brazil	Brazil
2	20	Jannon Roland	United States	New England Blizzard
3	36	Shawnetta Stewart	United States	Rutgers
4	52	Romana Hamzová	Czechoslovakia	Gambrinus Brno (Czech Republic)

=== Transactions ===
Date	Transaction
December 15, 1999	Lost Yolanda Moore to the Miami Sol in the WNBA expansion draft
December 15, 1999	Lost Tari Phillips to the Portland Fire in the WNBA expansion draft
April 25, 2000	Drafted Cíntia dos Santos, Jannon Roland, Shawnetta Stewart and Romana Hamzová in the 2000 WNBA draft

== Roster ==
2000 Orlando Miracle roster
Players
Coaches

Pos.	No.	Nat.	Name	Height	Weight	DOB	From	Yrs
C	28	(Brazil)	dos Santos, Cíntia	6' 5" (1.96m)	187 lb (85kg)	1975-01-31		R
G	24	(United States)	Gayden, Cornelia	5' 9" (1.75m)		1971-05-11	LSU	R
C	15	(Czechoslovakia)	Hamzová, Romana	5' 9" (1.75m)	148 lb (67kg)	1970-08-17		R
F/C	22	(United States)	Hicks, Jessie	6' 4" (1.93m)	188 lb (85kg)	1971-12-02	Maryland	1
G	31	(United States)	Johnson, Adrienne	5' 10" (1.78m)	154 lb (70kg)	1974-02-05	Ohio State	3
G	14	(United States)	Johnson, Shannon	5' 7" (1.7m)	152 lb (69kg)	1974-08-18	South Carolina	1
G	12	(United States)	McCain, Tiffany	5' 10" (1.78m)	160 lb (73kg)	1978-03-08	Kentucky	R
F	10	(United States)	McGhee, Carla	6' 1" (1.85m)	173 lb (78kg)	1968-03-06	Tennessee	1
F/C	11	(United States)	McWilliams-Franklin, Taj	6' 2" (1.88m)	195 lb (88kg)	1970-10-20	St. Edward's	1
G	5	(United States)	Powell, Elaine	5' 8" (1.73m)	150 lb (68kg)	1975-08-09	Louisiana Tech	1
G	6	(United States)	Roland, Jannon	5' 11" (1.8m)	168 lb (76kg)	1975-02-03	Purdue	R
G/F	42	(United States)	Sales, Nykesha	6' 0" (1.83m)	184 lb (83kg)	1976-05-10	Connecticut	1
G	5	(United States)	Smith, LaCharlotte	6' 0" (1.83m)	150 lb (68kg)	1974-02-06	Mississippi State	R

Head coach
(United States) Carolyn Peck (Vanderbilt)
Assistant coaches
(United States) Rick Stukes
(United States) Charlene Thomas-Swinson

Legend

- (C) Team captain
- (DP) Unsigned draft pick
- (FA) Free agent
- (S) Suspended
- Injured

== Schedule ==
=== Regular season ===
2000 game log
Total: 16–16 (Home: 11–5; Road: 5–11)
May: 0–1 (Home: 0–0; Road: 0–1)

Game	Date	Team	Score	High points	High rebounds	High assists	Location Attendance	Record
1	May 31	@ Washington	L 66-92	Shannon Johnson (16)	Taj McWilliams-Franklin (8)	S. Johnson; Powell (5)	MCI Center	0–1

June: 9–5 (Home: 5–3; Road: 4–2)

Game	Date	Team	Score	High points	High rebounds	High assists	Location Attendance	Record
2	June 1	Charlotte	W 82-79	Nykesha Sales (24)	Taj McWilliams-Franklin (9)	Shannon Johnson (7)	TD Waterhouse Centre	1–1
3	June 3	@ Indiana	W 88-82	Shannon Johnson (16)	dos Santos; McWilliams-Franklin (5)	Shannon Johnson (10)	Conseco Fieldhouse	2–1
4	June 5	Sacramento	W 75-68	Nykesha Sales (22)	Taj McWilliams-Franklin (12)	Shannon Johnson (8)	TD Waterhouse Centre	3–1
5	June 7	@ Cleveland	L 79-83 (OT)	Nykesha Sales (24)	Taj McWilliams-Franklin (8)	Shannon Johnson (8)	Gund Arena	3–2
6	June 8	Minnesota	L 57-71	Taj McWilliams-Franklin (18)	Taj McWilliams-Franklin (9)	Shannon Johnson (3)	TD Waterhouse Centre	3–3
7	June 10	@ Charlotte	W 74-71	McWilliams-Franklin; Sales (20)	dos Santos; McWilliams-Franklin (6)	Taj McWilliams-Franklin (6)	Charlotte Coliseum	4–3
8	June 13	@ Utah	W 88-80	Shannon Johnson (19)	Nykesha Sales (6)	Shannon Johnson (12)	Delta Center	5–3
9	June 15	@ Minnesota	L 66-72	Nykesha Sales (23)	Cíntia dos Santos (11)	Shannon Johnson (3)	Target Center	5–4
10	June 17	Indiana	L 54-79	Taj McWilliams-Franklin (11)	Taj McWilliams-Franklin (6)	Shannon Johnson (4)	TD Waterhouse Centre	5–5
11	June 22	Cleveland	W 77-64	Taj McWilliams-Franklin (22)	Taj McWilliams-Franklin (11)	dos Santos; S. Johnson; McWilliams-Franklin; Powell; Sales (3)	TD Waterhouse Centre	6–5
12	June 24	Charlotte	W 69-68	Nykesha Sales (22)	Nykesha Sales (10)	Cíntia dos Santos (4)	TD Waterhouse Centre	7–5
13	June 26	Houston	L 58-70	McWilliams-Franklin; Sales (14)	Shannon Johnson (11)	Shannon Johnson (6)	TD Waterhouse Centre	7–6
14	June 28	Miami	W 61-53	Shannon Johnson (14)	Taj McWilliams-Franklin (8)	Shannon Johnson (4)	TD Waterhouse Centre	8–6
15	June 30	@ Miami	W 66-63	Taj McWilliams-Franklin (17)	Taj McWilliams-Franklin (9)	Adrienne Johnson (10)	American Airlines Arena	9–6

July: 5–7 (Home: 4–2; Road: 1–5)

Game	Date	Team	Score	High points	High rebounds	High assists	Location Attendance	Record
16	July 1	New York	W 69-57	Shannon Johnson (23)	Shannon Johnson (11)	Adrienne Johnson (3)	TD Waterhouse Centre	10–6
17	July 6	Indiana	W 72-60	Taj McWilliams-Franklin (22)	Shannon Johnson (7)	Shannon Johnson (4)	TD Waterhouse Centre	11–6
18	July 8	Seattle	W 64-53	Adrienne Johnson (18)	Taj McWilliams-Franklin (9)	Elaine Powell (5)	TD Waterhouse Centre	12–6
19	July 9	@ Detroit	W 68-62	Adrienne Johnson (17)	Taj McWilliams-Franklin (11)	Shannon Johnson (5)	The Palace of Auburn Hills	13–6
20	July 12	@ Cleveland	L 72-74	Taj McWilliams-Franklin (22)	Taj McWilliams-Franklin (7)	Elaine Powell (5)	Gund Arena	13–7
21	July 14	New York	L 51-55	Adrienne Johnson (22)	Adrienne Johnson (10)	Shannon Johnson (3)	TD Waterhouse Centre	13–8
22	July 19	Detroit	W 88-78	Nykesha Sales (20)	Taj McWilliams-Franklin (10)	Nykesha Sales (7)	TD Waterhouse Centre	14–8
23	July 21	@ Washington	L 59-61	Shannon Johnson (17)	Shannon Johnson (8)	Shannon Johnson (5)	MCI Center	14–9
24	July 23	Utah	L 66-69	A. Johnson; McWilliams-Franklin (18)	Cíntia dos Santos (11)	Shannon Johnson (7)	Madison Square Garden	14–10
25	July 25	@ Los Angeles	L 63-78	Cíntia dos Santos (14)	Shannon Johnson (7)	Shannon Johnson (6)	Great Western Forum	14–11
26	July 27	@ Sacramento	L 66-73	Nykesha Sales (25)	Shannon Johnson (10)	Shannon Johnson (9)	ARCO Arena	14–12
27	July 30	@ Portland	L 55-76	Adrienne Johnson (20)	Shannon Johnson (8)	Shannon Johnson (4)	Rose Garden	14–13

August: 2–3 (Home: 2–0; Road: 0–3)

Game	Date	Team	Score	High points	High rebounds	High assists	Location Attendance	Record
28	August 1	@ Phoenix	L 77-84	Adrienne Johnson (24)	Carla McGhee (7)	Shannon Johnson (7)	America West Arena	14–14
29	August 4	@ New York	L 57-70	Adrienne Johnson (14)	Taj McWilliams-Franklin (14)	Shannon Johnson (9)	Madison Square Garden	14–15
30	August 6	Detroit	W 92-63	Adrienne Johnson (10)	dos Santos; McWilliams-Franklin (8)	Shannon Johnson (9)	TD Waterhouse Centre	15–15
31	August 7	Washington	W 65-57	Nykesha Sales (16)	dos Santos; Sales (7)	Shannon Johnson (4)	TD Waterhouse Centre	16–15
32	August 9	@ Miami	L 64-68 (OT)	Taj McWilliams-Franklin (23)	Taj McWilliams-Franklin (13)	Shannon Johnson (6)	American Airlines Arena	16–16

=== Playoffs ===
2000 playoff game log
First round vs. Cleveland Rockers
Won Series: 2–0

Game	Date	Team	Score	High points	High rebounds	High assists	Location Attendance	Record
1	August 11	Cleveland	W 62–55	Taj McWilliams-Franklin (16)	Taj McWilliams-Franklin (10)	Shannon Johnson (5)	TD Waterhouse Centre	1–0
2	August 13	@ Cleveland	L 54–63	Adrienne Johnson (17)	Shannon Johnson (9)	Shannon Johnson (7)	Gund Arena	1–1
3	August 15	@ Cleveland	L 43–72	Nykesha Sales (13)	Taj McWilliams-Franklin (8)	dos Santos; A. Johnson; S. Johnson; McWilliams-Franklin (10)	Gund Arena	1–2

2000 playoff schedule

=== Season standings ===
Eastern Conference	W	L	PCT	Conf.	GB
New York Liberty ^{x}	20	12	.625	14–7	–
Cleveland Rockers ^{x}	17	15	.531	13–8	3.0
Orlando Miracle ^{x}	16	16	.500	13–8	4.0
Washington Mystics ^{x}	14	18	.438	13–8	6.0
Detroit Shock ^{o}	14	18	.438	10–11	6.0
Miami Sol ^{o}	13	19	.406	9–12	7.0
Indiana Fever ^{o}	9	23	.281	7–14	11.0
Charlotte Sting ^{o}	8	24	.250	5–16	12.0

== Statistics ==
Legend
GP	Games played	GS	Games started	MPG	Minutes per game	RPG	Rebounds per game
APG	Assists per game	SPG	Steals per game	BPG	Blocks per game	PPG	Points per game
FG%	Field-goal percentage	3P%	3-point field-goal percentage	FT%	Free-throw percentage	TO	Turnovers per game
PF	Fouls per game		Team leader		League leader

=== Regular season ===
Player	GP	GS	MPG	FG%	3P%	FT%	RPG	APG	SPG	BPG	PPG
Shannon Johnson	32	32	35.2	.395	.333	.743	4.8	5.3	1.8	0.2	11.9
Adrienne Johnson	32	31	34.4	.445	.351	.895	2.8	1.7	0.8	0.1	13.6
Taj McWilliams-Franklin	32	32	34.3	.524	.294	.713	7.6	1.7	1.8	1.0	13.7
Nykesha Sales	32	32	31.1	.444	.395	.694	4.3	2.2	1.5	0.4	13.4
Cíntia dos Santos	32	31	25.6	.423	.000	.702	3.9	1.2	0.5	2.0	7.1
Elaine Powell	20	1	17.4	.394	.333	.773	2.5	2.1	0.6	0.1	3.6
Carla McGhee	32	0	12.8	.361	.000	.692	2.0	0.7	0.7	0.2	2.7
Tiffany McCain	25	0	8.6	.306	.227	.889	0.4	0.2	0.1	0.0	2.0
Jannon Roland	21	0	8.2	.351	.300	.500	0.8	0.4	0.3	0.0	1.6
Jessie Hicks	26	1	6.0	.435	N/A	.621	1.0	0.2	0.1	0.3	1.5
LaCharlotte Smith	3	0	4.0	.667	.000	1.000	0.7	0.3	0.7	0.0	1.7
Romana Hamzová	15	0	2.9	.182	.000	.500	0.2	0.3	0.3	0.0	0.5
Cornelia Gayden	3	0	2.3	.500	.000	N/A	0.0	0.3	0.0	0.0	0.7

^{‡}Waived/Released during the season
^{†}Traded during the season
^{≠}Acquired during the season

== Awards and honors ==
- Shannon Johnson, Taj McWilliams-Franklin and Nykesha Sales were named to the WNBA All-Star team.
- Shannon Johnson was named to the All-WNBA Second Team for the second time in her career.
