= Elaine Powell =

American basketball player (born 1975)

Minnesota Lynx
- Position: Assistant coach

Personal information
- Born: August 9, 1975 (age 51) Monroe, Louisiana, U.S.
- Listed height: 5 ft 8 in (1.73 m)
- Listed weight: 150 lb (68 kg)

Career information
- High school: Carroll (Monroe, Louisiana)
- College: Pearl River CC (1993–1995); LSU (1995–1997)
- WNBA draft: 1999: 4th round, 50th overall pick
- Drafted by: Orlando Miracle
- Playing career: 1997–2008

Career history
- 1997–1998: Portland Power
- 1999–2002: Orlando Miracle
- 2002–2005: Detroit Shock
- 2006: Chicago Sky
- 2006–2008: Detroit Shock

Career highlights
- 3× WNBA champion (2003, 2006, 2008); 2× First-team All-SEC (1996, 1997); As assistant coach: WNBA Commissioner's Cup Champion (2024)
- Stats at Basketball Reference

Elaine Powell (born August 9, 1975) is an American assistant coach for the Minnesota Lynx and former professional basketball player. A point guard born in Monroe, Louisiana, she played in the WNBA from 1999 to 2008.

== College career ==
In two years at LSU, Powell averaged 19.1 points per game (fourth in school history). She finished her career as LSU's 11th all-time leading scorer (1,163 points).

== ABL career ==
Powell was drafted 20th overall in the 1997 ABL draft by the Portland Power. Powell was the starting point guard for the team.

== WNBA career ==
After the ABL folded, Powell was drafted 50th overall in the 1999 WNBA draft by the Orlando Miracle. Half way through the 2002 WNBA season she was traded to the Detroit Shock in exchange for Wendy Palmer. In November 2005, Powell was selected by the Chicago Sky in the expansion draft. During the 2006 WNBA season, she was waived by the Sky. Four days later, the Detroit Shock signed her as a free agent. During the 2008 WNBA season (when not injured), Powell started all 16 of the games she played. She shot 49% from the field (second best in career).

== Career statistics ==
Legend
GP	Games played	GS	Games started	MPG	Minutes per game	RPG	Rebounds per game
APG	Assists per game	SPG	Steals per game	BPG	Blocks per game	PPG	Points per game
TO	Turnovers per game	FG%	Field-goal percentage	3P%	3-point field-goal percentage	FT%	Free-throw percentage
**Bold**	Career best	°	League leader

=== WNBA ===
==== Regular season ====
Year	Team	GP	GS	MPG	FG%	3P%	FT%	RPG	APG	SPG	BPG	TO	PPG
1999	Orlando	18	0	14.2	**51.5**	11.1	54.5	1.3	1.8	0.5	0.2	1.1	2.6
2000	Orlando	20	1	17.4	39.4	33.3	77.3	2.5	2.1	0.6	0.1	1.5	3.6
2001	Orlando	32	32	**33.0**	40.2	38.2	75.5	3.1	3.1	**1.5**	0.2	2.5	**11.2**
2002	Orlando	15	1	20.5	35.4	18.2	61.5	2.1	2.0	1.3	0.3	2.0	5.9
2002	Detroit	15	13	26.5	44.6	27.3	**85.0**	**4.2**	4.0	**1.5**	**0.5**	2.7	9.9
2003	Detroit	**33**	**33**	28.4	45.1	35.0	74.5	3.2	3.9	1.4	0.3	2.4	9.0
2004	Detroit	30	26	25.3	37.7	0.0	58.0	2.8	**4.5**	1.2	0.3	2.0	4.4
2005	Detroit	29	21	23.1	43.7	0.0	60.0	2.8	2.7	1.0	0.1	1.8	5.6
2006	Chicago	14	3	18.1	43.3	0.0	70.8	1.8	2.6	0.9	0.2	1.9	4.9
2006	Detroit	11	0	10.6	18.8	0.0	57.1	1.2	1.4	0.3	0.0	**0.8**	1.3
2007	Detroit	32	12	10.1	40.7	0.0	69.6	1.1	1.4	0.4	0.1	0.9	1.9
2008	Detroit	16	16	19.6	49.0	**50.0**	75.0	3.1	2.2	0.4	0.1	1.1	3.6
Career	12 years, 3 teams	265	158	21.7	41.7	32.4	69.8	2.5	2.8	1.0	0.2	1.8	5.7

==== Playoffs ====
Year	Team	GP	GS	MPG	FG%	3P%	FT%	RPG	APG	SPG	BPG	TO	PPG
2003	Detroit	8	8	27.4	34.8	**20.0**	63.6	**3.8**	4.8	0.9	**0.5**	1.6	5.1
2004	Detroit	3	3	**32.3**	50.0	0.0	52.9	2.0	**7.0**	**3.3**	0.0	2.7	**7.7**
2005	Detroit	2	0	16.0	0.0	0.0	0.0	3.5	2.5	1.5	0.0	1.0	0.0
2007	Detroit	**11**	3	8.5	33.3	0.0	**100.0**	1.0	1.1	0.5	0.0	**0.7**	0.9
2008	Detroit	9	**9**	19.0	**58.8**	0.0	81.8	2.3	2.0	0.7	0.0	1.4	3.2
Career	5 years, 1 team	33	23	18.6	41.9	20.0	67.4	2.3	2.8	0.9	0.1	1.3	3.1

=== College ===
Year	Team	GP	GS	MPG	FG%	3P%	FT%	RPG	APG	SPG	BPG	TO	PPG
1995–96	LSU	**32**	-	-	47.6	37.0	**74.9**	**6.0**	3.8	**2.5**	0.3	-	**20.1**
1996–97	LSU	29	-	-	**49.2**	**37.3**	69.2	4.5	**4.1**	2.4	**0.5**	-	17.9
**Career**		61	-	-	48.3	37.1	72.3	5.3	4.0	2.5	0.4	-	19.1
Statistics retrieved from Sports-Reference.
