= Orlando Miracle =

WNBA team

- Conference: Eastern
- Leagues: WNBA
- Founded: 1999
- History: Orlando Miracle; 1999–2002; Connecticut Sun; 2003–2026; Houston Comets; 2027–future
- Arena: TD Waterhouse Centre
- Location: Orlando, Florida
- Team colors: Electric Blue, White, QuickSilver, Magic Black
Home	Away

The Orlando Miracle were a Women's National Basketball Association (WNBA) team based in Orlando, Florida. It began play in the 1999 WNBA season. The Miracle relocated, in 2003, to Uncasville, Connecticut, where the team became the Connecticut Sun. The Miracle was a sister team to the NBA's Orlando Magic.

== History ==
The city of Orlando was granted an expansion franchise in 1998, and the Orlando Miracle took the floor for the 1999 WNBA season. The league held their second expansion draft for the Miracle and the Minnesota Lynx on April 6, 1999.

The Miracle posted respectable records in their four years of existence (1999–2002). The Miracle made the playoffs once, in 2000, and lost in the first round against the Cleveland Rockers. In 2001, the Miracle took a step backwards, but they hosted the 2001 WNBA All-Star Game. In 2002, the Miracle posted a 16-16 record, but missed the playoffs after losing the tiebreaker for the final playoff spot to the Indiana Fever.

The 2002 season would also prove to be the Miracle's last in Orlando.

Miracle alternative logo.

=== Relocation to Connecticut ===
After the 2002 WNBA season, the NBA sold off all of the WNBA franchises to the operators of the teams. Magic owner Rich DeVos was not interested in keeping the Miracle, and no local ownership group emerged. In January 2003, the Connecticut-based Mohegan Native American Tribe bought the team.

The new owners moved the team to Uncasville, Connecticut and changed the nickname to the Sun (in reference to the tribe's Mohegan Sun casino). The Connecticut Sun's new nickname and logo were reminiscent of another Florida-based WNBA franchise, the Miami Sol, which folded at the same time as the Miracle.

=== Uniforms ===
- 1999–2002: For home games, white with blue on the sides and shoulders and white Miracle logo text on the chest. For away games, blue with white on the sides and white Miracle logo text on the chest. The Miracle logo is on the shorts.

== Season-by-season records ==
Season	Team	Conference		Regular season			Playoff Results
Season	Team	Conference		W	L	PCT	Playoff Results
Orlando Miracle
1999	1999	East	4th	15	17	.469	
2000	2000	East	3rd	16	16	.500	Lost Conference Semifinals (Cleveland, 1–2)
2001	2001	East	5th	13	19	.406	
2002	2002	East	5th	16	16	.500	
Regular season				60	68	.469	0 Conference Championships
Playoffs				1	2	.333	0 WNBA Championships

== Players ==
=== Final roster ===
2002 Orlando Miracle roster
Players
Coaches

Pos.	No.	Nat.	Name	Height	Weight	From
F	50	(United States)	Cunningham, Davalyn	6' 0" (1.83m)	187 lb (85kg)	Rutgers
C	28	(Brazil)	dos Santos, Cintia	6' 5" (1.96m)	187 lb (85kg)	Brazil
G/F	32	(United States)	Douglas, Katie	6' 0" (1.83m)	165 lb (75kg)	Purdue
F/C	22	(United States)	Hicks, Jessie	6' 4" (1.93m)	188 lb (85kg)	Maryland
G	31	(United States)	Johnson, Adrienne	5' 10" (1.78m)	154 lb (70kg)	Ohio State
G	14	(United States)	Johnson, Shannon	5' 7" (1.7m)	152 lb (69kg)	South Carolina
C	00	(Mozambique)	Machanguana, Clarisse	6' 5" (1.96m)	180 lb (82kg)	Old Dominion
G/F	12	(United States)	McCain, Tiffany	5' 10" (1.78m)	167 lb (76kg)	Kentucky
F	10	(United States)	McGhee, Carla	6' 1" (1.85m)	179 lb (81kg)	Tennessee
F/C	11	(United States)	McWilliams, Taj (C)	6' 2" (1.88m)	184 lb (83kg)	St. Edward's College
F	3	(United States)	Palmer-Daniel, Wendy	6' 2" (1.88m)	165 lb (75kg)	Virginia
G/F	42	(United States)	Sales, Nykesha (C)	6' 0" (1.83m)	175 lb (79kg)	Connecticut
F	21	(United States)	Wyckoff, Brooke	6' 1" (1.85m)	183 lb (83kg)	Florida State

Head coach
(United States) Dee Brown (Jacksonville)
Assistant coaches
(United States) Vonn Read (Clark Atlanta)
(United States) Valerie Still (Kentucky)

Legend

- (C) Team captain
- (DP) Unsigned draft pick
- (FA) Free agent
- (S) Suspended
- Injured

=== Former players ===
- Cintia dos Santos 2000–2002
- Katie Douglas 2001–2002
- Jessie Hicks 2000–2002
- Adrienne Johnson 1999–2002
- Shannon Johnson 1999–2002
- Carla McGhee 1999–2002
- Taj McWilliams-Franklin 1999–2002
- Elaine Powell 1999–2002
- Nykesha Sales 1999–2002
- Brooke Wyckoff 2001–2002
- Monica "Monee" Sheppard

== Coaches ==
=== Head coaches ===
Orlando Miracle head coaches
Name	Start	End	Seasons	Regular season				Playoffs			
Name	Start	End	Seasons	W	L	PCT	G	W	L	PCT	G
Carolyn Peck	July 6, 1998	April 3, 2002	4	44	52	.458	96	1	2	.333	3
Dee Brown	April 5, 2002	End of 2002	1	16	16	.500	32	0	0	.000	0

=== General managers ===
- Carolyn Peck (1999-2002)
- Dee Brown (2002)

=== Assistant coaches ===
- Rick Stukes (1999–2000)
- Charlene Thomas-Swinson (1999–2001)
- Michael Peck (2001)
- Vonn Read (2002)
- Valerie Still (2002)

== All-time notes ==
=== Draft picks ===
Current WNBA players are in italics.

- 1999 Expansion Draft: Andrea Congreaves (2), Kisha Ford (4), Yolanda Moore (6), Adrienne Johnson (8)
- 1999 WNBA Draft: Tari Phillips (8), Sheri Sam (20), Taj McWilliams-Franklin (32), Carla McGhee (44), Elaine Powell (50)
- 2000 WNBA Draft: Cintia dos Santos (4), Jannon Roland (20), Shawnetta Stewart (36), Romona Hanzova (52)
- 2001 WNBA Draft: Katie Douglas (10), Brooke Wyckoff (26), Jaclyn Johnson (42), Anne Thorius (58)
- 2002 WNBA Draft: Davalyn Cunningham (23), Saundra Jackson (39), Tomeka Brown (55)

=== Trades ===
- April 18, 2002: The Miracle acquire Clarisse Machanguana from the Charlotte Sting for the Miracle's first-round pick in the 2002 WNBA Draft.
- July 8, 2002: The Miracle acquire Wendy Palmer from the Detroit Shock for Elaine Powell.

=== All-Stars ===
- 1999: Taj McWilliams-Franklin, Shannon Johnson, Nykesha Sales
- 2000: Taj McWilliams-Franklin, Shannon Johnson, Nykesha Sales
- 2001: Taj McWilliams-Franklin, Nykesha Sales
- 2002: Shannon Johnson, Nykesha Sales

=== Regular season attendance ===
- A sellout for a basketball game at TD Waterhouse Center is 17,248.

Regular Season All-Time Attendance
Year	Average: Home	Average: Away	High	Low	Sellouts	Total for Year	WNBA Game Average
1999	9,801 (6th)	10,889	15,442	7,028	0	156,818	10,207
2000	7,363 (11th)	8,885	9,464	5,731	0	117,810	9,074
2001	7,430 (11th)	8,560	11,903	5,363	0	118,874	9,105
2002	7,115 (13th)	9,433	13,111	4,323	0	113,837	9,228
