= Nykesha Sales =

American basketball player and coach (born 1976)

UConn Huskies
- Title: Assistant coach
- League: Big East Conference

Personal information
- Born: May 10, 1976 (age 50) Bloomfield, Connecticut, U.S.
- Listed height: 6 ft 0 in (1.83 m)

Career information
- High school: Bloomfield (Bloomfield, Connecticut)
- College: UConn (1994–1998)
- Playing career: 1998–2008
- Position: Small forward
- Number: 42
- Coaching career: 2016–present

Career history

Playing
- 1999–2007: Orlando Miracle / Connecticut Sun

Career highlights
- 8× WNBA All-Star (1999–2006); All-WNBA Second Team (2004); WNBA steals co-leader (2004); No. 42 retired by Connecticut Sun; NCAA champion (1995); 2× All-American – Kodak, USBWA (1997, 1998); First-team All-American – AP (1998); Second-team All-American – AP (1997); Big East Player of the Year (1998); 2× Big East Defensive Player of the Year (1997, 1998); Big East Tournament MOP (1997); 2× First-team All-Big East (1997, 1998); Big East Freshman of the Year (1995); Big East All-Freshman Team (1995)
- Stats at Basketball Reference
Medals
Women's basketball
Representing United States
Jones Cup
| Gold medal – first place | 1994 Taipei, Taiwan | Team Competition |
| Bronze medal – third place | 1995 Taipei, Taiwan | Team Competition |
| Gold medal – first place | 1996 Taipei, Taiwan | Team Competition |
World University Games
| Gold medal – first place | 1997 Marsala, Sicily, Italy | Team competition |

Nykesha Simone Sales (born May 10, 1976) is an American assistant coach at the University of Connecticut. She is a former professional basketball player in the WNBA, as well as playing in the Bosnian league for the ZKK Mladi Krajisnik club. Her primary position is the small forward. Her second position is shooting guard. In 1999, Sales was added to the roster of the USA FIBA Senior National Team. Her brother Brooks Sales played forward for Villanova from 1998 to 2002, and currently plays overseas in Spain for the Club Baloncesto Breogán of Lugo.

== High school ==
Sales attended Bloomfield High School in Bloomfield, Connecticut, and lettered in basketball. She was named the USA Today High School National Player of the Year in basketball, as a senior. Sales was named a High School All-American by the WBCA. She participated in the WBCA High School All-America Game in 1994, scoring 21 points.

== Amateur career ==
Sales attended the University of Connecticut (UConn) as a business major from 1994 to 1998. She was a member of the powerhouse UConn women's basketball team.

In 1995 she helped lead UConn to an undefeated NCAA Women's Division I Basketball Championship as well as a Final Four appearance in the 1996 NCAA Tournament. She was named Big East Rookie of the Year in 1995. In 1997 she was a member of the Gold medal USA Women's World University Games. In 1997-98 she helped the team make two Elite Eight appearances. In the 1997–98 season, she was named to the All-American first team, Defensive Player of the Year, and also the BIG EAST Player of the Year. She was also named to the 1996–97 and 1997-98 Kodak All-America teams. Sales was a member of the inaugural class (2006) of inductees to the University of Connecticut women's basketball "Huskies of Honor" recognition program.

=== USA Basketball ===
Sales was named to the team representing the US at the 1994 William Jones Cup competition in Taipei, Taiwan. The USA team won all eight games, winning the gold medal, but not without close calls. In three games the teams had to come from behind to win. One preliminary game ended up as a single-point victory, and the gold medal game went to overtime before the USA team beat South Korea by a single point, 90–89. Sales averaged 2.5 points per game.

Sales competed with USA Basketball as a member of the 1995 Jones Cup Team that won the Bronze in Taipei. She averaged 7.8 points per game and was second on the team in steals, with ten.

Sales was invited to be a member of the Jones Cup team representing the US in 1996. She helped the team to a 9–0 record, and the gold medal in the event. Sales averaged 4.8 points per game.

Sales represented the US at the 1997 World University Games held in Marsala, Sicily, Italy in August 1997. The USA team won all six games, earning the gold medal at the event. Sales was the team's leading scorer, averaging 18.3 points per game. In the game against Cuba, Sales scored 32 points, which set a record for points scored in a gold medal game, and represents the third highest point total by an American recorded at the World University Games.

=== UConn scoring record controversy ===
Sales left college as UConn's all-time leading scorer with 2,178 career points. She scored the record-breaking points as part of a staged controversial layup. Sales had suffered an injury that had essentially ended her collegiate career. UConn's next game (against Villanova University) began with Villanova permitting Sales to complete an uncontested layup; UConn then returned the favor, allowing Villanova to score (the game essentially began with a 2–2 score before serious play commenced). UConn head coach Geno Auriemma felt bad that Sales did not already have the record, as he had made her sit on many occasions to avoid running up the score. The staged basket, while questioned in retrospect, was his attempt to make it up to her. He contacted the previous record holder, Kerry Bascom, as well as Big East Commissioner Mike Tranghese to ensure that the incident would not be a problem, although the media was, and to a degree continues to be, critical of the move. Sales's record would eventually be broken by Tina Charles.

Sales wore #24 in high school, the same number worn by Kerry Bascom at Connecticut. When Sales was considering going to Connecticut, she was respectful enough of Bascom's position, that she asked if she could wear #42, reversing the digits, rather than asking to wear #24.

== Professional career ==
=== WNBA ===
On September 15, 1998, Sales was selected as part of the league's initial player allocation by the Orlando Miracle. She remained with the franchise even when the Miracle relocated to Uncasville, Connecticut and was renamed the Connecticut Sun prior to the 2003 season. She helped lead the team to the WNBA Finals in 2004 and 2005. Sales was named to the WNBA All-Star team six times. Until she missed 12 games in the 2006 season, Sales had started 248 consecutive regular season games, the second longest such streak in WNBA history.

Despite repeatedly making the annual All-Star team since the beginning of her career, Sales was left off the announced All-Decade Team on June 13, 2006 as part of a celebration of the league's 10th Anniversary. On March 11, 2008, Sales noted that she would not participate in the 2008 WNBA campaign due to nagging injuries. Sales also noted that her sitting out was not an early retirement, but just a break. However, she ultimately did not return to the WNBA.

=== International ===
- 2005-2006: (Czech Republic) Gambrinus Brno
- 2007: (Poland) Lotos Gdynia
- 2007-2008: (Lithuania) TEO Vilnius and (Latvia) SK Cēsis
- 2008-2009: (Latvia) SK Cēsis and (Czech Republic) ZVVZ USK Praha
- 2010-2013: (Turkey) Beşiktaş JK
- 2012-13: (Bosnia and Herzegovina) ZKK Mladi Krajisnik

== Sports diplomacy ==
Sales has also been an active participant in the SportsUnited Sports Envoy program for the U.S. Department of State. In this function, she has traveled to Cape Verde, Haiti, the Republic of Korea, Uganda, Ukraine, and Venezuela, where she worked with the likes of Becky Bonner, Christopher Clunie, Samuel Dalembert, Alex English, Willie Greens, Jason Maxiell and Tamika Raymond to conduct basketball clinics and events that directly or indirectly reached more than 2350 youth from underserved areas. In so doing, Sales helped contribute to SportsUnited's mission to reach out to youth populations in order to promote community leadership, education, women's inclusion and empowerment, inclusion of marginalized communities, and the inclusion of people with disabilities.

== Career statistics ==
Legend
| GP | Games played | GS | Games started | MPG | Minutes per game | RPG | Rebounds per game |
| APG | Assists per game | SPG | Steals per game | BPG | Blocks per game | PPG | Points per game |
| TO | Turnovers per game | FG% | Field-goal percentage | 3P% | 3-point field-goal percentage | FT% | Free-throw percentage |
| **Bold** | Career best | ° | League leader |

=== WNBA ===
==== Regular season ====
| Year | Team | GP | GS | MPG | FG% | 3P% | FT% | RPG | APG | SPG | BPG | TO | PPG |
|---|---|---|---|---|---|---|---|---|---|---|---|---|---|
| 1999 | Orlando | 32 | 32 | 32.5 | 38.5 | 33.0 | 80.5 | 4.2 | 2.8 | **2.2** | 0.3 | 2.2 | 13.7 |
| 2000 | Orlando | 32 | 32 | 31.1 | **44.4** | 39.5 | 69.4 | 4.3 | 2.2 | 1.5 | **0.4** | 2.1 | 13.4 |
| 2001 | Orlando | 32 | 31 | 32.5 | 43.8 | 31.4 | 78.4 | **5.4** | 1.8 | **2.2** | 0.2 | 2.3 | 13.5 |
| 2002 | Orlando | 32 | 32 | **32.6** | 41.2 | 32.2 | 79.2 | 3.8 | 1.9 | 1.9 | 0.2 | 2.2 | 13.5 |
| 2003 | Connecticut | **34** | **34** | 32.5 | 41.5 | 38.6 | 80.6 | 4.3 | 2.7 | 1.4 | **0.4** | 2.1 | **16.1** |
| 2004 | Connecticut | **34** | **34** | 32.2 | 43.2 | 31.8 | 72.7 | 4.0 | 2.9 | **2.2** | 0.2 | 2.2 | 15.2 |
| 2005 | Connecticut | **34** | **34** | 31.6 | 41.7 | **42.2** | 75.0 | 3.6 | 2.2 | 1.8 | 0.3 | 1.9 | 15.6 |
| 2006 | Connecticut | 22 | 20 | 27.7 | 42.9 | 40.0 | 72.0 | 3.7 | 2.7 | 1.2 | 0.3 | **1.3** | 13.0 |
| 2007 | Connecticut | 26 | 25 | 29.3 | 39.2 | 32.4 | **87.8** | 4.0 | **3.2** | 1.4 | **0.4** | 2.2 | 13.1 |
| Career | 9 years, 2 teams | 278 | 274 | 31.5 | 41.8 | 35.6 | 78.1 | 4.2 | 2.5 | 1.8 | 0.3 | 2.1 | 14.2 |

==== Playoffs ====
| Year | Team | GP | GS | MPG | FG% | 3P% | FT% | RPG | APG | SPG | BPG | TO | PPG |
|---|---|---|---|---|---|---|---|---|---|---|---|---|---|
| 2000 | Orlando | 3 | 3 | **35.3** | **48.4** | 30.0 | 0.0 | 3.0 | 1.3 | 1.0 | 0.0 | 3.0 | 11.0 |
| 2003 | Connecticut | 4 | 4 | 32.8 | 42.5 | 0.0 | 72.2 | 3.3 | 2.3 | 1.3 | 0.8 | 1.8 | 11.8 |
| 2004 | Connecticut | **8** | **8** | 32.5 | 43.1 | **51.7** | 68.2 | 5.4 | 1.4 | **3.1** | 0.8 | 2.5 | **14.8** |
| 2005 | Connecticut | **8** | **8** | 33.8 | 36.6 | 42.1 | **80.6** | 4.0 | 2.4 | 2.0 | **1.0** | 2.0 | 14.4 |
| 2006 | Connecticut | 5 | 5 | 30.2 | 15.8 | 13.3 | 78.6 | **6.0** | **3.4** | 1.4 | 0.6 | **1.0** | 5.0 |
| 2007 | Connecticut | 3 | 3 | 34.7 | 41.9 | 44.4 | 70.0 | 5.0 | 2.0 | 0.3 | 0.0 | 2.3 | 12.3 |
| Career | 6 years, 2 teams | 31 | 31 | 33.0 | 38.5 | 37.4 | 73.2 | 4.6 | 2.1 | 1.8 | 0.6 | 2.1 | 12.1 |

=== College ===
Legend
| GP | Games played | GS | Games started | MPG | Minutes per game |
| FG% | Field goal percentage | 3P% | 3-point field goal percentage | FT% | Free throw percentage |
| RPG | Rebounds per game | APG | Assists per game | SPG | Steals per game |
| BPG | Blocks per game | PPG | Points per game | **Bold** | Career high |

Nykesha Sales Statistics at University of Connecticut
| Year | GP | FG | FGA | FG% | 3FG | 3FGA | 3P% | FT | FTA | FT% | REB | RPG | A | B | S | MIN | PTS | PPG |
| 1994-95 | 35 | 159 | 294 | 0.541 | 35 | 81 | **0.432** | 45 | 77 | 0.584 | 162 | 4.6 | 73 | **11** | 102 | 753 | 398 | 11.4 |
| 1995-96 | **38** | 237 | **459** | 0.516 | 30 | 89 | 0.337 | 92 | 131 | 0.702 | 168 | 4.4 | 101 | **11** | 104 | **1028** | 596 | 15.7 |
| 1996-97 | 34 | 215 | 430 | 0.500 | 29 | 81 | 0.358 | 97 | 128 | 0.758 | **192** | 5.6 | **111** | 7 | **143** | 917 | 556 | 16.4 |
| 1997-98 | 30 | **241** | 426 | **0.566** | **40** | **105** | 0.381 | **106** | **135** | **0.785** | 166 | **5.5** | 86 | **11** | 98 | 813 | **628** | **20.9** |
| Totals | 137 | 852 | 1609 | 0.530 | 134 | 356 | 0.376 | 340 | 471 | 0.722 | 688 | 5.0 | 371 | 40 | 447 | 3511 | 2178 | 15.9 |

== See also ==
- List of Connecticut women's basketball players with 1000 points
