= Shannon Johnson (basketball) =

American basketball player (born 1974)

Personal information
- Born: August 18, 1974 (age 52) Hartsville, South Carolina, U.S.
- Listed height: 5 ft 7 in (1.70 m)
- Listed weight: 152 lb (69 kg)

Career information
- High school: Hartsville (Hartsville, South Carolina)
- College: South Carolina (1992–1996)
- WNBA draft: 1999: Allocated
- Drafted by: Orlando Miracle
- Playing career: 1997–2009
- Position: Point guard
- Number: 14

Career history
- 1997–1998: Columbus Quest
- 1999–2003: Orlando Miracle/Connecticut Sun
- 2004–2006: San Antonio Silver Stars
- 2007: Detroit Shock
- 2008: Houston Comets
- 2009: Seattle Storm

Career highlights
- 5× WNBA All-Star (1999, 2000, 2002–2004); 3× All-WNBA Second Team (1999, 2000, 2002); Third-team All-American – AP (1996); First-team All-SEC (1994–1996)
- Stats at WNBA.com
- Stats at Basketball Reference
Medals
Women's basketball
Representing United States
Jones Cup
Bronze medal – third place	1995 Taipei	Team Competition
Gold medal – first place	1996 Taipei	Team Competition
World University Games
Gold medal – first place	1997 Marsala	Team competition
FIBA World Championship for Women
Gold medal – first place	2002 Nanjing	Team Competition
Olympics
Gold medal – first place	2004 Athens	Team Competition

Shannon Regina "Pee Wee" Johnson (born August 18, 1974) is an American basketball player born in Hartsville, South Carolina. She last played for the Seattle Storm in the WNBA. She was the head coach at Coker College in Hartsville, South Carolina from 2015 to 2020.

== Career ==
=== ABL ===
After her collegiate playing days, Johnson played for the Columbus Quest with whom she won the 1997 and 1998 American Basketball League championships.

=== WNBA ===
On May 3, 1999, Johnson was selected as part of the league's post-expansion draft player allocation by the Orlando Miracle. Her debut game was played on June 10, 1999 in a 63-77 loss to the Houston Comets where she recorded 13 points, 1 rebound, 7 assists and 5 steals. She also played for Fenerbahçe İstanbul from Turkey in winter 1999–00 season. In her rookie season, Johnson was named to the All-WNBA 2nd Team.

The Miracle moved to Connecticut in 2003 and became the Connecticut Sun.

Johnson was a WNBA All-Star in 1999, 2000, 2002 and 2003.

On January 28, 2004 Johnson was traded to the San Antonio Silver Stars for a 1st round pick, 2nd round pick and 3rd round pick all for the 2004 draft. Respectively, these three picks materialized to Lindsay Whalen, Jessica Brungo, and [andance Futrell.

On July 3, 2006, Johnson tied Semeka Randall Lay's record for the most steals in a game by a Silver Stars player by recording 8 steals in a 85 - 63 win over the Los Angeles Sparks. Johnson also recorded 12 points, 3 rebounds and 9 assists in that game.

In March 2007, Johnson signed with the Detroit Shock. Her time with the shock would be the first time where Johnson wasn't a regular starter. From 1999 to 2006 with the Miracle/Sun and Silver Stars, Johnson started in 246 out of 252 games. However, she would only start in 8 out of 33 games in her sole season with the Shock and average 16.9 minutes per game (after previously averaging at least 27 minutes for the previous 8 seasons).

On March 7, 2008, Johnson signed with the Houston Comets. When the Comets folded, she was not picked in the dispersal draft and therefore became a free agent.

For the 2009 season, she signed with the Seattle Storm on February 23, 2009. This season with the Storm ended up being Johnson's final season in the league and she averaged 4.0 points, 1.8 rebounds and 1.5 assists in 18.2 minutes per game. Johnson's final WNBA game was Game 3 of the Western Conference First Round against the Los Angeles Sparks on September 20, 2009. In her final game, Johnson fouled out of the game after 12 minutes as the Storm fell 64 - 75 and be eliminated from the playoffs. Before fouling out, she recorded 2 points, 1 rebound,2 assists and 1 steal.

=== Overseas ===
She played in Spain for Ros Casares Valencia (2001-2002), Perfumerías Avenida (2002-2003), Dynamo Moscow (2003-2004), Wisla Cracovia (2004-2005), Cadi la Seu (2005-2006), Tarsus Beledeyesi (2006-2007), Palacio de Congresos Ibiza (2008-2010) and CD Zamarat (2010-2011). She was also a key factor in the club as she helped carry the team to Division One on May 1, 2011. S

== USA Basketball ==
Johnson competed with USA Basketball as a member of the 1995 Jones Cup Team that won the Bronze in Taipei. She averaged 4.3 points per game.

Johnson was also invited to be a member of the Jones Cup team representing the US in 1996. She helped the team to a 9–0 record, and the gold medal in the event. Johnson averaged 4.8 points per games and recorded 18 steals, second-highest on the team.

Johnson represented the US at the 1997 World University Games held in Marsala, Sicily, Italy in August 1997. The USA team won all six games, earning the gold medal at the event. Johnson averaged 2.3 points per game.

In 2002, Johnson was named to the national team which competed in the World Championships in Zhangjiagang, Changzhou and Nanjing, China. The team was coached by Van Chancellor. In the quarterfinals, Johnson came off the bench to score 20 points, to help the US team win against Spain and advance. After beating Australia in the semifinals, the USA team faced Russia for the gold medal. Johnson had a steal late in the game when the USA team held a two-point margin. the USA went on to win and capture the gold medal. Johnson averaged 9.1 points per game and had 18 assists, tied for second on the team.

She was also a member of the USA Basketball team winning the gold medal at the 2004 Summer Olympics.

== Career statistics ==
Legend
GP	Games played	GS	Games started	MPG	Minutes per game	RPG	Rebounds per game
APG	Assists per game	SPG	Steals per game	BPG	Blocks per game	PPG	Points per game
TO	Turnovers per game	FG%	Field-goal percentage	3P%	3-point field-goal percentage	FT%	Free-throw percentage
**Bold**	Career best	°	League leader

=== WNBA ===
==== Regular season ====
Year	Team	GP	GS	MPG	FG%	3P%	FT%	RPG	APG	SPG	BPG	TO	PPG
1999	Orlando	32	32	**35.8**	**44.7**	36.4	68.6	4.7	4.4	1.7	**0.4**	3.8	14.0
2000	Orlando	32	32	35.2	39.5	33.3	74.3	**4.8**	5.3	1.8	0.2	3.2	11.9
2001	Orlando	26	22	30.2	36.7	36.5	75.7	3.0	2.6	1.3	0.2	2.1	11.6
2002	Orlando	31	31	**35.8**	40.4	27.3	76.6	4.2	5.3	1.6	0.2	3.2	**16.1**
2003	Connecticut	**34**	**34**	32.6	43.3	26.0	73.1	3.9	**5.8**	1.3	0.1	3.1	12.4
2004	San Antonio	31	30	30.8	38.0	35.5	76.6	2.6	4.4	1.5	0.1	3.2	9.3
2005	San Antonio	**34**	33	32.5	36.5	31.1	83.1	2.7	4.6	1.4	0.1	3.3	9.3
2006	San Antonio	32	32	27.3	40.6	35.2	80.4	3.0	3.7	**1.9**	0.2	2.3	9.9
2007	Detroit	33	8	16.9	34.3	**41.4**	82.0	1.8	1.7	0.6	0.1	**1.2**	5.8
2008	Houston	33	32	30.7	37.9	32.0	74.7	3.2	5.1	1.6	0.3	2.4	7.7
2009	Seattle	**34**	6	18.2	33.6	29.5	**85.5**	1.8	1.5	0.8	0.2	1.5	4.0
Career	11 years, 6 teams	352	292	29.5	39.5	33.3	76.4	3.2	4.0	1.4	0.2	2.7	10.1

==== Playoffs ====
Year	Team	GP	GS	MPG	FG%	3P%	FT%	RPG	APG	SPG	BPG	TO	PPG
2000	Orlando	3	3	**39.7**	22.2	15.4	50.0	**7.0**	4.7	1.7	**0.7**	2.3	6.0
2003	Connecticut	4	**4**	32.8	**44.8**	**50.0**	**77.8**	3.0	**4.8**	**1.8**	0.3	2.8	**11.3**
2007	Detroit	**11**	1	16.9	35.8	34.6	76.9	2.3	2.5	0.5	0.2	**1.2**	5.2
2009	Seattle	3	0	13.0	33.3	20.0	0.0	1.7	1.0	1.0	0.0	2.0	2.3
Career	11 years, 6 teams	21	8	22.6	34.7	31.5	71.8	3.0	3.0	1.0	0.2	1.8	6.0

=== College ===
Legend
GP	Games played	GS	Games started	MPG	Minutes per game
FG%	Field goal percentage	3P%	3-point field goal percentage	FT%	Free throw percentage
RPG	Rebounds per game	APG	Assists per game	SPG	Steals per game
BPG	Blocks per game	PPG	Points per game	**Bold**	Career high

Year	Team	GP	Points	FG%	3P%	FT%	RPG	APG	SPG	BPG	PPG
1992-93	South Carolina	27	259	42.0%	36.0%	72.4%	3.6	3.1	2.4	0.1	9.6
1993-94	South Carolina	27	634	**45.7%**	39.6%	68.8%	5.9	4.9	2.4	0.6	23.5
1994-95	South Carolina	27	646	43.1%	35.2%	67.8%	**6.4**	**5.1**	2.1	0.7	23.9
1995-96	South Carolina	**28**	**691**	43.8%	**40.6%**	**74.3%**	6.0	4.0	**2.6**	**0.7**	**24.7**
Career	South Carolina	109	2230	43.9%	38.2%	70.4%	5.5	4.3	2.4	0.5	20.5

== See also ==
- List of WNBA career assists leaders
