= Cíntia Santos =

Brazilian basketball player

Personal information
- Full name: Cíntia Silva dos Santos
- Nickname: Cíntia Tuiú
- Born: 31 January 1975 (age 51) Mauá, Brazil
Medal record
Women's basketball
Representing Brazil
Olympic Games
Silver medal – second place	1996 Atlanta	Team competition
Bronze medal – third place	2000 Sydney	Team competition
World Championship
Gold medal – first place	1994 Australia	Team

Cíntia "Tuiú" Silva dos Santos (born 31 January 1975 in Mauá) is a Brazilian former basketball player. In over a decade with the national team, she competed in three Olympics - 1996, 2000, and 2004 - winning two medals, and three World Championships, winning it all in 1994.

== WNBA career statistics ==
Legend
GP	Games played	GS	Games started	MPG	Minutes per game	RPG	Rebounds per game
APG	Assists per game	SPG	Steals per game	BPG	Blocks per game	PPG	Points per game
TO	Turnovers per game	FG%	Field-goal percentage	3P%	3-point field-goal percentage	FT%	Free-throw percentage
**Bold**	Career best	°	League leader

=== Regular season ===
Year	Team	GP	GS	MPG	FG%	3P%	FT%	RPG	APG	SPG	BPG	TO	PPG
2000	Orlando	**32**	**31**	**25.6**	.423	.000	.702	**3.9**	**1.2**	**0.5**	**2.0**	1.7	**7.1**
2001	Orlando	10	0	6.5	.368	.000	**.833**	0.6	0.2	0.3	0.5	**0.7**	1.9
2002	Orlando	26	0	10.0	**.491**	.000	.783	1.3	0.4	0.2	0.5	0.8	3.4
Career	3 years, 1 teams	68	31	16.8	.432	.000	.743	2.4	0.7	0.3	1.2	1.2	4.9

=== Playoffs ===
Year	Team	GP	GS	MPG	FG%	3P%	FT%	RPG	APG	SPG	BPG	TO	PPG
2000	Orlando	3	3	27.3	.500	.000	1.000	2.7	1.0	0.7	2.3	1.7	6.0
