= Taj McWilliams-Franklin =

American basketball player (born 1970)

- McWilliams-Franklin in 2026

Personal information
- Born: October 20, 1970 (age 56) El Paso, Texas, U.S.
- Listed height: 6 ft 2 in (1.88 m)
- Listed weight: 188 lb (85 kg)

Career information
- High school: T. W. Josey (Augusta, Georgia)
- College: Georgia State (1989–1990); St. Edward's (1990–1993)
- WNBA draft: 1999: 3rd round, 32nd overall pick
- Drafted by: Orlando Miracle
- Playing career: 1993–2014
- Position: Power forward / center
- Number: 11, 3, 44, 7, 8

Career history

Playing
- 1993–1994: Wolfenbüttel
- 1994–1995: Contern
- 1995–1996: Galilee
- 1996–1998: Richmond / Philadelphia Rage
- 1999–2006: Orlando Miracle / Connecticut Sun
- 1999–2002: Famila Schio
- 2003–2004: Lavezzini Parma
- 2004–2005: Gambrinus Brno
- 2005: Dandenong Rangers
- 2005–2006: CB Halcón Viajes
- 2006: Ansan Shinhan Bank S-Birds
- 2006–2007: Spartak Moscow Region
- 2007: Ansan Shinhan Bank S-Birds
- 2007: Los Angeles Sparks
- 2008: Washington Mystics
- 2008–2009: Detroit Shock
- 2008–2009: Galatasaray
- 2009–2010: Frisco Sika Brno
- 2010: New York Liberty
- 2011–2012: Minnesota Lynx
- 2011: Ros Casares
- 2011: Spartak Moscow Region
- 2012: Wisła Can-Pack Kraków
- 2013–2014: CAB-Clube Amigos do Basquet

Coaching
- 2018: Dallas Wings (Interim HC)

Career highlights
- 2× WNBA champion (2008, 2011); 6× WNBA All-Star (1999–2001, 2005–2007); 2× All-WNBA Second Team (2005–2006); WNBA All-Defensive Second Team (2005); No. 11 Retired by retired by Connecticut Sun; 2× Ronchetti Cup winner (2001, 2002); WNBL champion (2005); Spanish National League champion (2006); Queen's Cup winner (2006); Russian National League champion (2007); Polish National League champion (2012); Polish Cup winner (2012); EuroLeague champion (2007); WNBA all-time offensive rebounding leader; Kim Perrot Sportsmanship Award (2005)
- Stats at WNBA.com
- Stats at Basketball Reference
- Women's Basketball Hall of Fame
Medals
Women's Basketball
Representing United States
FIBA World Championship for Women
Gold medal – first place	1998 Germany	Team competition

Taj McWilliams-Franklin (born October 20, 1970) is an American former professional basketball player.

A two-time WNBA champion with the Detroit Shock and Minnesota Lynx and six-time all-star, McWilliams-Franklin's professional career has spanned three decades, and began before the WNBA was founded. She retired from the WNBA after the 2012 season. She was inducted into the Women's Basketball Hall of Fame in 2024.

== College career ==
After attending T. W. Josey High School in Augusta, Georgia, McWilliams-Franklin attended Georgia State University in 1989 and played on the school's basketball team for one season. However, she had become pregnant during her senior year in high school, and after the coach who recruited her to Georgia State was let go, the incoming staff told her "school was no place for kids." McWilliams-Franklin moved to Austin, Texas, where a friend connected her with St. Edward's University coach Dave McKey. She enrolled at St. Edwards as a Rhetoric major.

While at St. Edward's, she set school records and individual achievements, including:

- NAIA National Player of the Year in 1993
- Selected to the 1993 Kodak NAIA All-American team
- Member of the 1992 NAIA All-America second team
- Set school records for career scoring (1,837 points), most points scored for a single season (760), highest scoring average (24.5 ppg) and highest field goal percentage (.640)

McWilliams-Franklin said that after her first year at St. Edward's, she had the potential opportunity to transfer to a Division I school, but declined to pursue it, because she "felt loyalty is rewarded with loyalty."

== USA Basketball ==
McWilliams-Franklin was named to the USA national team in 1998. The national team traveled to Berlin, Germany, in July and August 1998 for the FIBA World Championships. The USA team won a close opening game against Japan 95–89, then won their next six games easily. In the semifinal game against Brazil, the American team was behind by as much as ten points in the first half, but went on to win 93–79. The gold medal game was a rematch against Russia. In the first game, the American team dominated almost from the beginning, but in the rematch, the team from Russia took the early lead and led much of the way. With under two minutes remaining, the USA was down by two points, but held on to win the gold medal, 71–65.

== ABL career ==
McWilliams-Franklin was drafted in 1996 (40th overall pick) and played two seasons for the Philadelphia Rage of the American Basketball League (ABL). She led the league in blocks with 1.5 per game, and ranked fifth in field goal percentage (.528). She was also a member of the 1997 All-ABL second team.

== WNBA career ==
McWilliams-Franklin has had a lengthy WNBA career, earning two titles and recognition as one of the all-time great post players in league history. She ranks first in career offensive rebounds and second in career total rebounds.

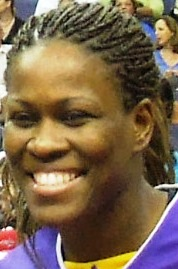
McWilliams-Franklin at the 2007 All-Star Game

McWilliams-Franklin was selected by the Orlando Miracle in the third round (32nd overall pick) of the 1999 WNBA draft. She starred for the Miracle for four years and remained with the franchise even when the it relocated to Uncasville, Connecticut, and was renamed the Connecticut Sun prior to the 2003 season. From 1999 to 2008, McWilliams-Franklin played in six WNBA All-Star Games.

She was also a member of the starting team of the 2004 WNBA All-Star squad that played against a select group of players (who were also WNBA players) from the USA Basketball team. That game was held on August 4, 2004 at the historic Radio City Music Hall in New York City. The game was held in place of the regular WNBA All-Star Game and was a send-off for the USA Basketball squad prior to their participation at the 2004 Summer Olympics in Athens, Greece.

McWilliams-Franklin was the recipient of the 2005 Kim Perrot Sportsmanship Award. She was awarded a Tiffany-designed trophy and $5,000. In addition, she designated an additional $5,000 to go to the Mary Elizabeth House in Richmond, Virginia. She was also 2nd team all WNBA in 2005.

In February 2007, she was traded to the Los Angeles Sparks in exchange for the draft rights of Érika de Souza and a future selection in the 2007 WNBA draft.

On April 22, 2008 the Los Angeles Sparks traded McWilliams-Franklin to the Washington Mystics for DeLisha Milton-Jones. On August 12, 2008 McWilliams-Franklin was traded to the Detroit Shock for Tasha Humphrey, Eshaya Murphy, and a second round pick in the 2009 WNBA draft. Following the trade, McWilliams-Franklin won her first WNBA championship with the Shock as they defeated the San Antonio Silver Stars in a 3-game sweep.

On April 22, 2010, McWilliams-Franklin signed a free agent deal with the New York Liberty.

She was targeted as a key free agent acquisition by Minnesota Lynx head coach Cheryl Reeve prior to the 2011 season. McWilliams-Franklin played as the team's starting center throughout the season, averaging 7.0 rebounds per game and 11.6 points per game. Lynx Assistant Coach Jim Petersen credited McWilliams-Franklin with having an outsize impact on the team both on and off the court, saying, "You can talk all you want about the things she has done on the floor, but it is in the locker room, in the scouting reports, in the film sessions and just even around the airport -- she's somebody to talk to that has been there and done that. She has seen it all."

Teammate Candice Wiggins agreed, noting that the team had nicknamed her "Mama Taj", and that "she is like a coach, a big sister for us, off the court and on. She has taken us all in. We are like her little chickies and she is the mother hen."

Despite her age, McWilliams-Franklin was a key contributor to the Lynx's 2011 WNBA championship. She started 33 of 34 games during the regular season, and during the playoffs led her team in points once and assists three times, the last despite playing with a knee sprain. As of 2017, she remains the oldest player in league history to win a championship.

McWilliams-Franklin came back for the 2012 season. Her longevity and talent earned her the career record for offensive rebounds in August, passing Yolanda Griffith. On October 4, 2012, McWilliams-Franklin played in her 59th postseason game, the most of any player in league history.

McWilliams-Franklin retired at the end of the 2012 season, though in a 2013 interview, she said she had not completely ruled out a comeback as a player in 2014.

Born Taj McWilliams, she married Reggie Franklin in 2000 and assumed a hyphenated surname.

== Career statistics ==
Legend
GP	Games played	GS	Games started	MPG	Minutes per game	RPG	Rebounds per game
APG	Assists per game	SPG	Steals per game	BPG	Blocks per game	PPG	Points per game
TO	Turnovers per game	FG%	Field-goal percentage	3P%	3-point field-goal percentage	FT%	Free-throw percentage
**Bold**	Career best	°	League leader

†	Denotes seasons in which McWilliams-Franklin won a WNBA championship

=== Regular season ===
Year	Team	GP	GS	MPG	FG%	3P%	FT%	RPG	APG	SPG	BPG	TO	PPG
1999	Orlando	32	32	32.6	.480	**.444**	.667	7.5	1.6	**1.8**	1.2	2.5	13.1
2000	Orlando	32	32	**34.3**	**.524**	.294	.713	7.6	1.7	**1.8**	1.0	2.5	13.7
2001	Orlando	32	32	33.1	.474	.200	.744	7.6	2.2	1.6	**1.6**	2.5	12.6
2002	Orlando	13	12	29.5	.500	.333	**.871**	4.8	1.0	1.5	1.1	1.6	8.5
2003	Connecticut	**34**	**34**	28.9	.442	.279	.745	6.7	1.4	1.3	1.0	1.5	10.4
2004	Connecticut	**34**	**34**	33.3	.477	.000	.602	7.2	1.9	1.4	1.3	2.1	12.1
2005	Connecticut	**34**	**34**	31.9	.495	.222	.787	7.3	1.9	1.1	0.7	1.7	**13.9**
2006	Connecticut	32	32	31.0	.498	.125	.736	**9.6**	2.5	1.1	1.0	2.4	12.8
2007	Los Angeles	29	27	29.3	.490	.231	.773	5.9	1.7	1.2	1.0	1.7	11.1
2008*	Washington	26	26	33.2	.525	.280	.730	7.3	1.6	1.7	1.0	2.8	13.3
2008*	Detroit	7	7	26.4	.422	1.000	.909	6.7	1.9	0.4	0.7	1.2	10.7
2008^{†}	Total	33	33	31.7	.506	.308	.776	7.2	1.6	1.4	0.9	2.5	12.8
2009	Detroit	**34**	**34**	30.4	.491	.200	.750	6.6	**2.9**	1.0	0.5	1.9	9.8
2010	New York	**34**	**34**	29.2	.511	.261	.826	5.4	2.0	1.4	0.9	**1.5**	10.6
2011^{†}	Minnesota	**34**	33	28.4	.444	.222	.770	6.0	2.4	1.0	0.7	1.5	8.3
2012	Minnesota	33	33	26.6	.519	.400	.750	5.4	2.5	1.0	1.3	2.0	8.4
Career	14 years, 7 teams	440	436	30.8	.489	.279	.737	6.8	2.0	1.3	1.0	2.1	11.4

=== Postseason ===
Year	Team	GP	GS	MPG	FG%	3P%	FT%	RPG	APG	SPG	BPG	TO	PPG
2000	Orlando	3	3	**35.7**	.474	.000	.778	7.7	1.7	0.7	1.0	1.6	14.3
2003	Connecticut	4	4	30.5	.511	.200	**.941**	7.5	1.3	**1.5**	0.5	1.5	**16.3**
2004	Connecticut	8	8	31.5	.402	.500	.667	7.4	1.9	**1.5**	0.8	1.6	10.4
2005	Connecticut	8	8	35.5	.511	.333	.789	**9.4**	1.6	1.1	**1.4**	2.0	15.9
2006	Connecticut	5	5	32.6	.429	.000	.667	**9.4**	2.2	0.4	0.8	1.8	12.8
2008^{†}	Detroit	**9**	**9**	32.6	.490	.500	.864	7.0	2.1	1.0	1.3	1.8	12.9
2009	Detroit	5	5	26.8	**.643**	**1.000**	.500	4.4	1.8	1.0	0.4	2.6	7.6
2010	New York	5	5	30.4	.447	.000	.727	8.6	2.6	0.6	1.0	3.0	8.4
2011^{†}	Minnesota	8	8	30.3	.455	.000	.833	5.3	**3.3**	0.6	1.2	2.2	10.6
2012	Minnesota	**9**	**9**	27.0	.379	.000	.692	4.2	2.2	0.7	1.4	**1.3**	5.9
Career	10 years, 6 teams	64	64	31.1	.465	.250	.783	6.9	2.1	0.9	1.1	1.9	11.2

=== College ===
Year	Team	GP	GS	MPG	FG%	3P%	FT%	RPG	APG	SPG	BPG	TO	PPG
1988–89	Georgia State	25	-	-	44.1	0.0	42.4	5.9	0.2	1.2	1.8	-	5.8
**Career**		25	-	-	44.1	0.0	42.4	5.9	0.2	1.2	1.8	-	5.8
Statistics retrieved from Sports-Reference.

== Overseas career ==
McWilliams-Franklin began her playing career overseas. She played in Wolfenbuettel, Germany (1993–94); Contern, Luxembourg (1994–95); and Galilee, Israel (1995–96).

She also spent the off-season in 1999–2001 playing in a professional league in Italy for Familia Schio. After the birth of her daughter, she went to Spain to play for Puig D'En Valls, Ibiza in 2003. Next she played for Brno, Czech Republic in 2004, and Lavezzini Parma (Italy) in 2005.

In the winter of 2005, McWilliams-Franklin played in the Women's Korean Basketball League with the Ansan Shinhan Bank S-Birds, and toured Australia, matching up with Dandenong Rangers in Melbourne. After the Korean season, she went to Salamanca, Spain, where she won a title, beating Barcelona in five games. She played half a season in Spartak Region, Moscow, Russia, then returned to the Ansan Shinhan Bank S-Birds in Korea for the Women's Korean Basketball League in 2006. She won the Korean title and was MVP of the finals in 2007 Winter League, beating the Yongin Samsung Bichumi and Lauren Jackson. After having knee surgery in the 2007 offseason, she played in the winter of 2007 in Israel. In 2008, she played for Galatasaray, Turkey, which won the Turkish President's Cup. In the winter of 2009, she returned to Famila Schio Beretta. She then returned to Brno for the whole season of 2009–2010.

In 2011, she played with the Spanish club Ros Casares Valencia on a short-term deal, and finished out the season with the WBC Spartak Moscow Region team that finished second in Euroleague Women. In 2012, she signed with Wisła Can-Pack Kraków.

In January 2014, at the age of 43, she returned to the courts to play in Portugal, with CAB Madeira.

=== Honors ===
- Women's Korean Basketball League – 2007 Winter League Finals MVP
- 2007–2008 Turkish Presidents Cup winner with (Turkey) Galatasaray

== Coaching career ==
In May 2012, it was announced that McWilliams-Franklin would join the Rice University coaching staff as an assistant to head coach Greg Williams. She was to join the team after the conclusion of the WNBA season. While there was speculation that this meant McWilliams-Franklin would retire at the end of the 2012 season, McWilliams-Franklin made no formal announcement, saying only that she was "looking forward to becoming a contributing member of [the] staff."

In March 2013, after formally retiring, McWilliams-Franklin joined the New York Liberty as an assistant coach under Bill Laimbeer.

After leaving the New York Liberty in October 2013, McWilliams-Franklin became an assistant coach for Boston University's Women's Basketball team in July 2014.

In May 2015, she was named the head coach for Post University women's basketball.

In 2017 she was hired as an assistant coach for the Dallas Wings.

On August 12, 2018, McWilliams-Franklin was named interim head coach for the Dallas Wings following the dismissal of head coach Fred Williams. During the off-season, McWilliams-Franklin was not retained. Brian Agler was hired from the Los Angeles Sparks to become the team's new head coach.

=== Head coaching record ===
Legend
Regular season	G	Games coached	W	Games won	L	Games lost	W–L %	Win–loss %
Playoffs	PG	Playoff games	PW	Playoff wins	PL	Playoff losses	PW–L %	Playoff win–loss %

Team	Year	G	W	L	W–L%	Finish	PG	PW	PL	PW–L%	Result
DAL	2018	3	1	2	.333	5th in West	1	0	1	.000	Lost in 1st Round
Career		3	1	2	.333		1	0	1	.000	

== Personal life ==
McWilliams-Franklin was born in El Paso, Texas. She has three daughters, and is married to Reginald Franklin. She lives in the San Antonio area.

McWilliams-Franklin was a vegan during some of her time as a player. In a 2008 article, she said, "I just wanted to make sure I had a healthy body because I wanted to continue playing for a longer period than most of my peers."

== See also ==
- List of WNBA career rebounding leaders
