= 1999 WNBA season =

- League: Women's National Basketball Association
- Sport: Basketball
- Duration: June 10 - September 5, 1999
- Games: 32
- Teams: 12
- Total attendance: 1,959,733
- Average attendance: 10,207
- TV partner(s): ESPN, NBC, Lifetime

Draft
- Top draft pick: (United States) Chamique Holdsclaw
- Picked by: Washington Mystics

Regular season
- Top seed: Houston Comets
- Season MVP: (United States) Yolanda Griffith (Sacramento)
- Top scorer: (United States) Cynthia Cooper-Dyke (Houston)

Playoffs
- Finals champions: Houston Comets
- Runners-up: New York Liberty
- Finals MVP: (United States) Cynthia Cooper-Dyke (Houston)

WNBA seasons
- ← 1998 2000 →

The 1999 WNBA season was the Women's National Basketball Association's third season. The 1999 season saw two expansion teams join the league, the Minnesota Lynx and Orlando Miracle. The 1999 WNBA expansion draft took place on April 6, 1999. The schedule was increased from 30 to 32 games per team. The season ended with the Houston Comets winning their third WNBA championship.

== Regular season ==
=== Standings ===
Eastern Conference

Eastern Conference	W	L	PCT	Conf.	GB
New York Liberty ^{x}	18	14	.563	12–8	–
Detroit Shock ^{x}	15	17	.469	12–8	3.0
Charlotte Sting ^{x}	15	17	.469	12–8	3.0
Orlando Miracle ^{o}	15	17	.469	9–11	3.0
Washington Mystics ^{o}	12	20	.375	10–10	6.0
Cleveland Rockers ^{o}	7	25	.219	5–15	11.0

Western Conference

Western Conference	W	L	PCT	Conf.	GB
Houston Comets ^{x}	26	6	.813	16–4	–
Los Angeles Sparks ^{x}	20	12	.625	12–8	6.0
Sacramento Monarchs ^{x}	19	13	.594	9–11	7.0
Phoenix Mercury ^{o}	15	17	.469	7–13	11.0
Minnesota Lynx ^{o}	15	17	.469	8–12	11.0
Utah Starzz ^{o}	15	17	.469	8–12	11.0

Note: Teams with an "X" clinched playoff spots.

== Playoffs ==
There were 12 teams in the league. For the playoffs, the three teams with the best record in each conference were seeded one to three. The top seeded team in each conference got a bye for the first round.

**Conference** **semifinals** single game
**Eastern**; **Conference**
E2	Detroit	54
E3	**Charlotte**	**60**
**Western**; **Conference**
W2	**Los Angeles**	**71**
W3	Sacramento	58

**Conference** **finals** Best-of-3
E1	**New York**	**2**
E3	Charlotte	1
W1	**Houston**	**2**
W2	Los Angeles	1

**WNBA Championship**; Best-of-3
E1	New York	1
W1	**Houston**	**2**

- **Bold** – Game or series winner
- Italics – Team with home-court advantage

== Awards ==
=== Individual ===
Award		Winner	Team
Most Valuable Player (MVP)		Yolanda Griffith	Sacramento Monarchs
Finals MVP		Cynthia Cooper	Houston Comets
Defensive Player of the Year		Yolanda Griffith	Sacramento Monarchs
Newcomer of the Year		Yolanda Griffith	Sacramento Monarchs
Shooting Champions	**Field goal percentage**	Murriel Page	Washington Mystics
Shooting Champions	**Free throw percentage**	Eva Nemcova	Cleveland Rockers
Rookie of the Year		Chamique Holdsclaw	Washington Mystics
Sportsmanship Award		Dawn Staley	Charlotte Sting
Entrepreneurial Achievement Award		Dawn Staley	Charlotte Sting
Coach of the Year		Van Chancellor	Houston Comets

=== Team ===
Award		Player	Team
All-WNBA	First Team	Sheryl Swoopes	Houston Comets
All-WNBA	First Team	Natalie Williams	Utah Starzz
All-WNBA	First Team	Yolanda Griffith	Sacramento Monarchs
All-WNBA	First Team	Cynthia Cooper	Houston Comets
All-WNBA	First Team	Ticha Penicheiro	Sacramento Monarchs
All-WNBA	Second Team	Chamique Holdsclaw	Washington Mystics
All-WNBA	Second Team	Tina Thompson	Houston Comets
All-WNBA	Second Team	Lisa Leslie	Los Angeles Sparks
All-WNBA	Second Team	Teresa Weatherspoon	New York Liberty
All-WNBA	Second Team	Shannon Johnson	Orlando Miracle

=== Player of the Week ===
Week ending	Player	Team
June 20	Cynthia Cooper	Houston Comets
June 27	Yolanda Griffith	Sacramento Monarchs
July 4	Chamique Holdsclaw	Washington Mystics
July 11	Natalie Williams	Utah Starzz
July 18	Sheryl Swoopes	Houston Comets
July 25	Yolanda Griffith (2)	Sacramento Monarchs
August 1	Sheryl Swoopes (2)	Houston Comets
August 8	Chamique Holdsclaw (2)	Washington Mystics
August 15	Ruthie Bolton	Sacramento Monarchs
August 21	Cynthia Cooper (2)	Houston Comets

== Coaches ==
=== Eastern Conference ===
- Charlotte Sting: Dan Hughes
- Cleveland Rockers: Linda Hill-MacDonald
- Detroit Shock: Nancy Lieberman
- New York Liberty: Richie Adubato
- Orlando Miracle: Carolyn Peck
- Washington Mystics: Nancy Darsch

=== Western Conference ===
- Houston Comets: Van Chancellor
- Los Angeles Sparks: Orlando Woolridge
- Minnesota Lynx: Brian Agler
- Phoenix Mercury: Cheryl Miller
- Sacramento Monarchs: Sonny Allen
- Utah Starzz: Fred Williams
