= List of WNBA players born outside the United States =

The following is a list of past and present WNBA players considered to be "international" by the league. The list does not include players born in the United States. The WNBA considers all players from outside the 50 states and District of Columbia as "international", even if they are American citizens from US territories such as Puerto Rico and the United States Virgin Islands.

== By country ==
Note: This list is correct through as of 7 May 2026.

Pos	G	Guard	F	Forward	C	Center
Years	Number of seasons played in the WNBA					
^	Denotes player who has been elected to the Women's Basketball Hall of Fame					
*	Denotes player who is still active in the WNBA					

Nationality^{[A]}	Birthplace^{[B]}	Player	Pos.	Career^{[C]}	Years	Notes	Ref.
Antigua and Barbuda	—	Desiree Francis	F	2000	1	—	
Australia	—	Georgia Amoore*	G	2026	1	—	
Australia	—	Amy Atwell	G	2022, 2024	2	—	
Australia	—	Rebecca Allen*	F	2015–2019, 2021–present	11	—	
Australia	—	Suzy Batkovic	C	2005, 2009	2	—	
Australia	—	Tully Bevilaqua	G	1998, 2000–2012	14	—	
Australia	—	Chloe Bibby	G	2025	1	—	
Australia	—	Jessica Bibby	G	2000	1	—	
Australia	—	Abby Bishop	F/C	2010, 2015–2016	3	—	
Australia	—	Isobel Borlase*	G	2026	1	—	
Australia	—	Carla Boyd	F	1998–1999, 2001	3	—	
Australia	—	Michelle Brogan	F	1998, 2000	2	—	
Australia	—	Sandy Brondello	G	1998–1999, 2001–2003	5	Later became WNBA coach.	
Australia	Territory of Papua and New Guinea (now Papua New Guinea)	Annie Burgess	G	1999, 2001–2003	4	Born in the Territory of Papua and New Guinea (then an external territory of Australia), moved to Australia as a child.	
Australia	United Kingdom	Liz Cambage	C	2011, 2013, 2018–2019, 2021–2022	6	Born in England to a Nigerian father and an Australian mother, moved to Australia at three months old.	
Australia	—	Michelle Cleary	G	2000–2001	2	—	
Australia	—	Trisha Fallon	G/F	1999, 2001	2	—	
Australia	—	Cayla George	C	2015, 2017–2018, 2023	4	—	
Australia	—	Kristi Harrower	G	1998–1999, 2001–2003, 2005, 2009	7	—	
Australia	—	Shyla Heal	G	2021	1	—	
Australia	—	Katrina Hibbert	G/F	2000	1	—	
Australia	—	Lauren Jackson^	F/C	2001–2012	12	—	
Australia	—	Rachel Jarry	F	2013	1	—	
Australia	New Zealand	Jae Kingi-Cross	G	2001, 2004, 2006	3	Born in New Zealand, moved to Australia at age 4.	
Australia	—	Alison Lacey	G	2010	1	—	
Australia	—	Tess Madgen	G	2015	1	—	
Australia	New Zealand	Ezi Magbegor*	F	2020–present	7	Born in New Zealand to Nigerian parents, moved to Australia at six years old.	
Australia	—	Anneli Maley	F	2022, 2026	2	—	
Australia	—	Jade Melbourne*	G	2023–present	4	—	
Australia	—	Jenna O'Hea	G/F	2011–2016	6	—	
Australia	—	Erin Phillips	G	2006, 2008–2009, 2011–2016	9	—	
Australia	—	Nyadiew Puoch*	F	2026	1	—	
Australia	—	Alanna Smith*	F	2019–present	8	—	
Australia	—	Belinda Snell	G	2005–2007, 2009–2011	6	—	
Australia	—	Miela Sowah*	G	2026	1	—	
Australia	—	Rachael Sporn	F	1998–1999, 2001	3	—	
Australia	—	Laura Summerton	C	2005–2006	2	—	
Australia	—	Stephanie Talbot*	G	2017–2019, 2021–2022, 2024	8	—	
Australia	—	Penny Taylor	F	2001–2007, 2009–2011, 2013–2014, 2016	13	—	
Australia	—	Michele Timms^	G	1997–2001	5	—	
Australia	—	Marianna Tolo	C	2015	1		
Australia	—	Kristen Veal	G	2001–2002	2	—	
Australia	—	Kristy Wallace	G	2022–2024	3	—	
Australia	—	Jennifer Whittle	C	1999, 2001	2	—	
Australia	—	Alex Wilson*	G	2026	1	—	
Bahamas	—	Waltiea Rolle	C	2014	1	First Bahamian to be drafted to the WNBA. Later became coach.	
Belarus	Soviet Union (now Belarus)	Yelena Leuchanka	C	2006–2007, 2010, 2012	4	—	
Belgium	—	Julie Allemand*	G	2020, 2022, 2024–present	5	—	
Belgium	—	Hind Ben Abdelkader	G	2018	1	—	
Belgium	—	Antonia Delaere*	G	2026	1	—	
Belgium	—	Kyara Linskens	C	2025–present	2	—	
Belgium	—	Emma Meesseman	C	2013–2017, 2019–2020, 2022, 2025	9	—	
Belgium	—	Kim Mestdagh	G	2019	1	—	
Belgium	—	Julie Vanloo	G	2024–2026	3	—	
Belgium	—	Ann Wauters	C	2000–2002, 2004–2005, 2008–2009, 2012, 2016	9	—	
Bosnia and Herzegovina	Yugoslavia (now Bosnia and Herzegovina)	Razija Mujanović	C	1998	1	Born in SFR Yugoslavia, has represented both FR Yugoslavia and Bosnia and Herzegovina internationally.	
Bosnia and Herzegovina	Bahamas	Jonquel Jones*	F	2016–2019, 2021–present	10	Born in the Bahamas and grew up in the United States, became a naturalized Bosnian citizen and represented Bosnia and Herzegovina internationally since 2019.	
Bosnia and Herzegovina	Yugoslavia (now Bosnia and Herzegovina)	Rankica Šarenac	C	2000	1	Born in SFR Yugoslavia, has represented both FR Yugoslavia and Bosnia and Herzegovina internationally.	
Brazil	—	Janeth Arcain^	G	1997–2003, 2005	8	—	
Brazil	—	Kamilla Cardoso*	C	2024–present	3	—	
Brazil	—	Iziane Castro Marques	G/F	2002–2003, 2005–2013	11	—	
Brazil	—	Nádia Gomes Colhado	C	2014–2015, 2017	3	—	
Brazil	—	Damiris Dantas*	F	2014–2015, 2017–2022, 2024–present	11	—	
Brazil	—	Érika de Souza	F/C	2002, 2007–2017	12	—	
Brazil	—	Cíntia dos Santos	C	2000–2002	3	—	
Brazil	—	Clarissa dos Santos	F	2015–2016	2	—	
Brazil	—	Helen Luz	G	2001–2003	3	—	
Brazil	—	Adriana Moisés	G	2001–2002, 2007	3	—	
Brazil	—	Cláudia Neves	G	1999–2002	4	—	
Brazil	—	Kelly Santos	F	2001–2002, 2008	3	—	
Brazil	—	Alessandra Santos de Oliveira	C	1998–2001	4	—	
Brazil	—	Stephanie Soares	C	2024	1	—	
Brazil	—	Leila Sobral	F	1998	1	—	
Bulgaria	—	Albena Branzova	F	1998	1	—	
Bulgaria	—	Gergana Branzova	F	1998	1	—	
Bulgaria	—	Gergana Slavtcheva	G	2003	1	—	
Bulgaria	—	Polina Tzekova	C	1999	1	—	
Cameroon	—	Monique Akoa Makani*	G	2025–present	2	—	
Cameroon	—	Dulcy Fankam Mendjiadeu	F	2023–2024, 2026	3	—	
Canada	—	Natalie Achonwa	F	2015–2022	8	—	
Canada	—	Kayla Alexander	C	2013–2020	7	—	
Canada	—	Laeticia Amihere*	F	2023–2024, 2026	3	—	
Canada	—	Miranda Ayim	F	2011	1	—	
Canada	—	Kelly Boucher	F	1998	1	—	
Canada	—	Bridget Carleton*	G	2019–present	8	—	
Canada	—	Stacey Dales	G/F	2002–2004, 2006–2007	5	—	
Canada	—	Aaliyah Edwards*	F	2024–present	3	—	
Canada	—	Nirra Fields	G	2016	1	—	
Canada	—	Kim Gaucher	F	2006–2008	3	—	
Canada	—	Amber Hall	F	2002	1	—	
Canada	—	Ruth Hamblin	C	2016	1	—	
Canada	—	MerleLynn Lange-Harris	F/C	1999	1	—	
Canada	—	Kia Nurse*	G	2018–2021, 2023–present	8	—	
Canada	—	Cassandre Prosper*	G	2026	1	—	
Canada	—	Nayo Raincock-Ekunwe	F	2017, 2019	2	—	
Canada	—	Tammy Sutton-Brown	C	2001–2012	12	—	
Canada	United Kingdom	Shona Thorburn	G	2006–2007	2	Born in England, moved to Canada at age 8, represented Canada internationally.	
Chile	—	Ziomara Morrison	C	2012	1	—	
China	—	Chen Nan	C	2009	1	—	
China	—	Han Xu*	C	2019, 2022–2023, 2026	4	—	
China	—	Li Meng	G	2023	1	—	
China	—	Li Yueru*	C	2022, 2024–present	4	—	
China	—	Miao Lijie	G	2005	1	—	
China	—	Shao Ting	F	2019	1	—	
China	—	Sui Feifei	G	2005	1	—	
China	—	Zheng Haixia	C	1997–1998	2	—	
Colombia	—	Levys Torres	C	2001	1	—	
Croatia	—	Ivana Dojkić	G	2023–2024	2	—	
Croatia	Yugoslavia (now Croatia)	Vedrana Grgin-Fonseca	F	2000–2002	3	Born in SFR Yugoslavia, has represented both FR Yugoslavia and Croatia internationally.	
Croatia	Yugoslavia (now Croatia)	Korie Hlede	G	1998–2002	5	Born in SFR Yugoslavia, has represented both FR Yugoslavia and Croatia internationally.	
Croatia	—	Nika Mühl	G	2024	1	—	
Czech Republic	Belgium	Emma Čechová*	C	2026	1	Born in Belgium to Czech parents, grew up in and represents Czechia.	
Czech Republic	Czechoslovakia (now Czech Republic)	Romana Hamzová	G	2000	1	—	
Czech Republic	—	Eliška Joklová*	G	2026	1	—	
Czech Republic	Czechoslovakia (now Czech Republic)	Zuzana Klimešová	F	2002–2003	2	—	
Czech Republic	Czechoslovakia (now Czech Republic)	Eva Němcová	F	1997–2001	5	Born in Czechoslovakia, has represented both Czechoslovakia and Czech Republic internationally.	
Czech Republic	Czechoslovakia (now Czech Republic)	Michaela Pavlíčková	F/C	2001, 2003	2	—	
Czech Republic	Czechoslovakia (now Czech Republic)	Jana Veselá	F	2010	1	—	
Czech Republic	Czechoslovakia (now Czech Republic)	Kamila Vodičková	F/C	2000–2006	7	Born in Czechoslovakia, has represented both Czechoslovakia and Czech Republic internationally.	
Denmark	—	Laura Ziegler*	F	2026	1	—	
Democratic Republic of the Congo	Zaire (now Democratic Republic of the Congo)	Mwadi Mabika	G/F	1997–2008	12	—	
Democratic Republic of the Congo	Zaire (now Democratic Republic of the Congo)	Chanel Mokango	G/F	2010	1	—	
Democratic Republic of the Congo	Zaire (now Democratic Republic of the Congo)	Bernadette Ngoyisa	C	2002, 2005–2006, 2008	4	—	
Finland	Egypt	Awak Kuier*	G	2021–2023, 2026	4	Born in Egypt to South Sudanese parents, moved to Finland at age 2, represented Finland internationally.	
France	—	Nell Angloma*	F	2026	1	—	
France	—	Pauline Astier*	G	2026	1	—	
France	—	Valériane Ayayi*	C	2015, 2026	2	—	
France	—	Marième Badiane	C	2025	1	—	
France	Cameroon	Lucienne Berthieu	F/C	2002–2004	3	—	
France	—	Noémie Brochant*	F	2026	1	—	
France	—	Céline Dumerc	G	2014	1	—	
France	—	Olivia Époupa	G	2024	1	—	
France	—	Marine Fauthoux*	G	2026	1	—	
France	—	Isabelle Fijalkowski	C	1997–1998	2	—	
France	Senegal	Émilie Gomis	G	2006	1	—	
France	—	Sandrine Gruda	F/C	2008–2010, 2014, 2016-2017	6	—	
France	—	Marine Johannès*	G	2019, 2022–2023, 2025–present	5	—	
France	—	Leïla Lacan*	G	2025–present	2	—	
France	—	Edwige Lawson-Wade	G	2005–2006, 2008–2010	5	—	
France	—	Carla Leite*	G	2025–present	2	—	
France	Cameroon	Dominique Malonga*	C	2025–present	2	Born in Cameroon, represents France internationally.	
France	—	Emmeline Ndongue	C	2006	1	—	
France	—	Sabrina Palie	G	2006	1	—	
France	—	Tima Pouye*	G	2026	1	—	
France	—	Iliana Rupert*	C	2022–2023, 2026	3	—	
France	—	Janelle Salaün*	F	2025–present	2	—	
France	—	Audrey Sauret	G	2001–2002	2	—	
France	—	Laure Savasta	G	1997	1	—	
France	—	Kadi Sissoko	F	2023	1	—	
France	—	Mamignan Touré	G	2025	1	—	
Germany	West Germany	Marlies Askamp	C	1997–2002	6	—	
Germany	—	Frieda Bühner*	F	2026	1	—	
Germany	—	Leonie Fiebich*	F	2024, 2026	2	—	
Germany	West Germany	Linda Fröhlich	F/C	2002–2003, 2006–2007	4	—	
Germany	—	Luisa Geiselsöder*	C	2025–present	2	—	
Germany	—	Marie Gülich	C	2018–2020	3	—	
Germany	—	Nyara Sabally*	F	2023–present	4	—	
Germany	West Germany	Martina Weber	C	2007	1	—	
Greece	—	Zoi Dimitrakou	F	2016	1	—	
Greece	—	Mariella Fasoula	G	2026	1	—	
Greece	—	Anastasia Kostaki	G	2006	1	—	
Greece	—	Evanthia Maltsi	G	2007	1	—	
Hungary	—	Bernadett Határ	C	2021, 2023	2	—	
Hungary	—	Dalma Ivanyi	G	1999–2000, 2003, 2005–2006	5	—	
Hungary	—	Dorka Juhász*	F	2023–2024, 2026	3	—	
Hungary	—	Andrea Nagy	G	1999–2002	4	—	
Hungary	—	Petra Ujhelyi	F/C	2003	1	—	
Israel	—	Shay Doron	G	2007	1	—	
Italy	—	Susanna Bonfiglio	G	2002	1	—	
Italy	—	Lorela Cubaj	F	2022–2024	3	—	
Italy	—	Laura Macchi	F	2004–2005	2	—	
Italy	—	Raffaella Masciadri	F	2004–2005, 2008	3	—	
Italy	—	Catarina Pollini	F	1997	1	—	
Italy	—	Kathrin Ress	C	2007	1	—	
Italy	—	Cecilia Zandalasini*	G	2017–2018, 2024–present	5	—	
Italy	—	Francesca Zara	G	2005	1	—	
Ivory Coast	—	Kadidja Diaby	C	2025	1	—	
Ivory Coast	—	Christelle N'Garsanet	C	2006	1	—	
Jamaica	—	Simone Edwards	C	2000–2005	6	—	
Jamaica	—	Aneika Henry	F	2012–2017	6	—	
Jamaica	Bahamas	Pollyanna Johns Kimbrough	C	1998, 2000–2004	6	Born in the Bahamas, moved to Jamaica at age 1.	
Jamaica	—	Nadine Malcolm	F	2001–2002	2	—	
Japan	—	Mikiko Hagiwara	G	1997–1998	2	—	
Japan	—	Rui Machida	G	2022	1	—	
Japan	—	Yuko Oga	G	2008	1	—	
Japan	—	Ramu Tokashiki	F	2015–2017	3	—	
Japan	—	Mai Yamamoto*	G	2026	1	—	
Kenya	—	Madina Okot*	C	2026	1	—	
Latvia	—	Anete Jēkabsone-Žogota	G	2009–2010, 2014	3	—	
Latvia	—	Kitija Laksa	G	2025	1	—	
Latvia	—	Zane Tamane	C	2006, 2012	2	—	
Lithuania	—	Laura Juškaitė*	F	2026	1	—	
Lithuania	—	Aneta Kaušaitė	F	1998	1	—	
Lithuania	—	Jurgita Štreimikytė	F	2000–2001, 2005	3	—	
Mali	—	Sika Koné*	F	2023–present	4	—	
Mali	—	Aicha Coulibaly*	G	2026–present	1	—	
Mali	—	Hamchétou Maïga-Ba	G/F	2002–2010	9	—	
Mexico	—	Lou Lopez Sénéchal	F	2024	1	Also has French citizenship.	
Montenegro	Yugoslavia (now Montenegro)	Jelena Dubljević	F	2016	1	—	
Montenegro	Yugoslavia (now Montenegro)	Hajdana Radunović	C	2001	1	—	
Mozambique	—	Clarisse Machanguana	C/F	1999–2002	4	—	
Netherlands	—	Marlous Nieuwveen	C	2005	1	—	
Netherlands	Suriname	Sandra Van Embricqs	F	1998	1	—	
New Zealand	—	Megan Compain	G	1997	1	—	
New Zealand	—	Charlisse Leger-Walker*	G	2026	1	—	
Nigeria	—	Evelyn Akhator	F/C	2017–2018	2	—	
Nigeria	—	Mactabene Amachree	F	2001, 2003, 2005	3	—	
Nigeria	—	Murjanatu Musa	F	2025	1	—	
Poland	—	Agnieszka Bibrzycka	G/F	2004, 2006	2	—	
Poland	—	Margo Dydek	C	1998–2008	11	—	
Poland	—	Ewelina Kobryn	F/C	2011–2012, 2014	3	—	
Poland	—	Krystyna Lara	G	1999	1	—	
Portugal	Cape Verde	Mery Andrade	G	1999–2002, 2004	5	—	
Portugal	—	Ticha Penicheiro	G	1998–2012	15	—	
Puerto Rico	—	Carla Cortijo	G	2015–2016	2	—	
Romania	—	Gabriela Mărginean	F	2010	1	—	
Romania	—	Florina Paşcalău	C	2008	1	—	
Russia	Soviet Union (now Russia)	Svetlana Abrosimova	F	2001–2008, 2010, 2012	10	—	
Russia	Soviet Union (now Kyrgyzstan)	Elena Baranova	F	1997–1999, 2001, 2003–2005	7	—	
Russia	Soviet Union (now Russia)	Evgeniya Belyakova	F	2016	1	—	
Russia	Soviet Union (now Russia)	Ilona Korstine	G	2001	1	—	
Russia	—	Anastasiia Kosu*	F	2025–present	2	—	
Russia	Soviet Union (now Russia)	Irina Osipova	C	2006	1	—	
Russia	Soviet Union (now Turkmenistan)	Elena Shakirova	F/C	2000–2002	3	—	
Russia	Soviet Union (now Russia)	Maria Stepanova	C	1998–2001, 2005	5	—	
Russia	—	Maria Vadeeva	C	2018–2019	2	—	
Russia	Soviet Union (now Russia)	Natalia Vodopyanova	F	2005	1	—	
Russia	Soviet Union (now Russia)	Oksana Zakaluzhnaya	C	2000, 2002	2	—	
Saint Vincent and the Grenadines	—	Sophia Young	F	2006–2012, 2014–2015	9	—	
Senegal	—	Maimouna Diarra	C	2017	1	—	
Senegal	—	Astou Ndiaye-Diatta	F/C	1999–2004, 2006–2007	8	—	
Serbia	Yugoslavia (now Serbia)	Nina Bjedov	C	1999	1	—	
Serbia	Yugoslavia (now Montenegro)	Ana Dabović	G	2015–2016	2	—	
Serbia	Yugoslavia (now Serbia)	Gordana Grubin	G	1999–2002, 2004–2005	6	—	
Serbia	Yugoslavia (now Bosnia and Herzegovina)	Tina Krajišnik	G	2022	1	—	
Serbia	Yugoslavia (now Serbia)	Katarina Lazić	G	2001	1	—	
Serbia	Yugoslavia (now Bosnia and Herzegovina)	Nikolina Milić	C	2022–2023, 2026	3	—	
Serbia	Yugoslavia (now Serbia)	Jelena Milovanović	F	2014	1	—	
Serbia	Yugoslavia (now Serbia)	Mila Nikolić	F	1999	1	—	
Serbia	Yugoslavia (now Serbia)	Jovana Nogić*	F	2026	1	—	
Serbia	Yugoslavia (now Serbia)	Jasmina Perazić-Gipe^	F	1997	1	—	
Serbia	Yugoslavia (now Serbia)	Sonja Petrović	F	2012, 2016	2	—	
Serbia	Yugoslavia (now Serbia)	Slobodanka Tuvić	C	2001–2004	4	—	
Serbia	Yugoslavia (now Bosnia and Herzegovina)	Daliborka Vilipić	F/C	2006	1	—	
Serbia	Yugoslavia (now Serbia)	Milica Vukadinović	G	1997	1	—	
Slovakia	Czechoslovakia (now Slovakia)	Andrea Kuklová	G	1998–1999	2	—	
Slovakia	Czechoslovakia (now Slovakia)	Zuzana Žirková	G	2003	1	—	
South Korea	—	Jung Sun-min	C	2003	1	—	
South Korea	—	Park Ji-hyun*	G	2026	1	—	
South Korea	—	Park Ji-su	C	2018–2019, 2021	3	—	
South Sudan	—	Adut Bulgak	C	2016–2018	3	Born in Sudan, moved to Canada at age 6, has represented both Canada and South Sudan internationally	
Spain	—	Elisa Aguilar	G	2002	1	—	
Spain	—	Raquel Carrera*	C	2026	1	—	
Spain	—	Maite Cazorla	G	2019	1	—	
Spain	—	Elisabeth Cebrián	C	1998	1	—	
Spain	—	María Conde*	F	2026	1	—	
Spain	—	Anna Cruz	G	2014–2016	3	—	
Spain	—	Awa Fam*	C	2026	1	—	
Spain	—	Marta Fernández	G	2007	1	—	
Spain	—	Marina Ferragut	F	2000	1	—	
Spain	—	Alicia Flórez*	G	2026	1	—	
Spain	—	Begoña García	G	2002	1	—	
Spain	Saint Vincent and the Grenadines	Sancho Lyttle	F	2005–2019	15	Born in Saint Vincent and the Grenadines, became a naturalized Spanish citizen, represented Spain internationally.	
Spain	—	Nuria Martínez	G	2005, 2010	2	—	
Spain	—	Anna Montañana	F	2009	1	—	
Spain	Senegal	Astou Ndour-Fall	C	2014, 2016, 2018–2021, 2024	7	Born in Senegal, moved to Spain at age 14, became a naturalized Spanish citizen, represented Spain internationally.	
Spain	—	Leticia Romero	G	2018	1	—	
Spain	—	Isabel Sánchez	G	2004	1	—	
Spain	—	Marta Suárez*	F	2026	1	—	
Spain	—	Amaya Valdemoro	F	1998–2000	3	—	
Spain	—	Marta Xargay	G	2015–2016	2	—	
Sweden	—	Farhiya Abdi	F	2013–2015	3	—	
Sweden	—	Frida Eldebrink	G	2016	1	—	
Sweden	—	Tanja Kostic	F	1998, 2000	2	—	
Sweden	—	Chioma Nnamaka	G	2008	1	—	
Sweden	—	Amanda Zahui B.	C	2015–2021, 2023	8	—	
Trinidad and Tobago	—	Pietra Gay	G/F	1997	1	—	
Trinidad and Tobago	—	Gillian Goring	C	2007	1	—	
Turkey	West Germany	LaToya Sanders	F/C	2008–2009, 2011, 2015–2016, 2018–2019	7	Born in West Germany to American parents, grew up in the United States, became a naturalized Turkish citizen and represented Turkey internationally.	
Turkey	—	Sevgi Uzun	G	2024–2025	2	—	
Turkey	Bulgaria	Nevriye Yılmaz	F/C	2003–2004	2	—	
Ukraine	Soviet Union (now Ukraine)	Valeriya Berezhynska	C	2008	1	—	
Ukraine	Soviet Union (now Ukraine)	Olga Firsova	C	2000	1	—	
Ukraine	Soviet Union (now Ukraine)	Inga Orekhova	G	2014–2015	2	—	
United Kingdom	—	Kristine Anigwe	F	2019–2023	5	Born in England to Nigerian parents, grew up in the United States, represented Great Britain internationally. Previously she represented the United States.	
United Kingdom	—	Andrea Congreaves	F/C	1997–1999	3	—	
United Kingdom	Anguilla	Mikiah Herbert Harrigan	F	2020–2021, 2024	3	—	
United Kingdom	—	Holly Winterburn*	G	2026	1	—	
United States	Liberia	Matee Ajavon	F	2008–2017	10	Born in Liberia, moved to the United States at age 6, represented the United States internationally.	
United States	United States Virgin Islands	Aliyah Boston	C	2023–present	4	—	
United States	West Germany	Kasha Terry	F/C	2006–2008	3	—	
United States	Germany	Kayla Thornton*	F	2015, 2017–present	11	—	
United States	United Kingdom	Elizabeth Williams*	C/F	2015–present	11	—	
United States Virgin Islands	—	Tajama Abraham	C	1997–1998	2	—	
Uzbekistan	Soviet Union (now Uzbekistan)	Elena Tornikidou	F	1999–2001	3	—	

== See also ==
- List of Women's National Basketball Association players
- List of NBA players born outside the United States
- List of international WNBL players
- List of Australian WNBA players
- List of Serbian WNBA players
