= 2001 New York Liberty season =

- Head coach: Richie Adubato
- Arena: Madison Square Garden

Results
- Record: 21–11 (.656)
- Place: 2nd (Eastern)
- Playoff finish: Lost Conference Finals (2-1) to Charlotte Sting

Media
- Television: WPIX (WB 11); Fox Sports Net New York; MSG Network; MetroTV

The 2001 WNBA season was the fifth season for the New York Liberty. The team attempted to reach the WNBA Finals, but they failed in the conference finals, losing in three games to the Charlotte Sting.

== Transactions ==
=== WNBA draft ===
| Round | Pick | Player | Nationality | School/Team/Country |
|---|---|---|---|---|
| 4 | 57 | Taru Tuukkanen | Finland | Xavier |
| 4 | 60 | Tara Mitchem | United States | Southwest Missouri State |

=== Transactions ===
| Date | Transaction |
|---|---|
| April 17, 2001 | Traded a 2001 2nd Round Pick and a 2001 3rd Round Pick to the Washington Mystics in exchange for Andrea Nagy and a 2001 4th Round Pick |
| April 20, 2001 | Drafted Taru Tuukkanen and Tara Mitchem in the 2001 WNBA draft |
| April 30, 2001 | Signed Hadjana Radunović and Stacey Ford |
| May 3, 2001 | Signed Katie Cronin |
| May 7, 2001 | Waived Shea Mahoney and Taru Tuukkanen |
| May 10, 2001 | Waived Jessica Bibby |
| May 14, 2001 | Waived Desiree Francis and Olga Firsova |
| May 16, 2001 | Waived Tara Mitchem |
| May 25, 2001 | Waived Katie Cronin |
| May 26, 2001 | Waived Marina Ferragut |
| June 5, 2001 | Traded a 2002 2nd Round Pick to the Los Angeles Sparks in exchange for Camille Cooper |
| June 5, 2001 | Waived Stacey Ford |
| July 9, 2001 | Signed Mactabene Amachree |

== Roster ==
2001 New York Liberty roster
Players
Coaches

| Pos. | No. | Nat. | Name | Height | Weight | DOB | From | Yrs |
|---|---|---|---|---|---|---|---|---|
| F | 13 | (Nigeria) | Amachree, Mactabene | 6' 1" (1.85m) | 175 lb (79kg) | 1978-01-30 | | R |
| C | 42 | (United States) | Cooper, Camille | 6' 4" (1.93m) | | 1979-02-05 | Purdue | R |
| G | 5 | (United States) | Daley, Grace | 5' 8" (1.73m) | 147 lb (67kg) | 1978-06-26 | Tulane | 1 |
| F | 20 | (United States) | Ford, Stacey | 6' 2" (1.88m) | | 1969-01-14 | Georgia | R |
| G | 25 | (United States) | Hammon, Becky | 5' 6" (1.68m) | 136 lb (62kg) | 1977-03-11 | Colorado State | 2 |
| G/F | 55 | (United States) | Johnson, Vickie | 5' 9" (1.75m) | 150 lb (68kg) | 1972-04-15 | Louisiana Tech | 4 |
| G | 10 | (Socialist Federal Republic of Yugoslavia) | Lazić, Katarina | 5' 10" (1.78m) | 147 lb (67kg) | 1980-05-25 | | R |
| C | 50 | (United States) | Lobo, Rebecca | 6' 4" (1.93m) | 185 lb (84kg) | 1973-10-06 | Connecticut | 3 |
| G | 16 | (Hungarian People's Republic) | Nagy, Andrea | 5' 7" (1.7m) | 147 lb (67kg) | 1971-11-16 | FIU | 2 |
| F/C | 24 | (United States) | Phillips, Tari | 6' 2" (1.88m) | 200 lb (91kg) | 1970-03-06 | Central Florida | 2 |
| C | 7 | (Socialist Federal Republic of Yugoslavia) | Radunović, Hajdana | 6' 3" (1.91m) | 187 lb (85kg) | 1978-01-10 | | R |
| F | 3 | (United States) | Robinson, Crystal | 5' 11" (1.8m) | 155 lb (70kg) | 1974-01-22 | SE Oklahoma State | 2 |
| G | 11 | (United States) | Weatherspoon, Teresa | 5' 8" (1.73m) | 161 lb (73kg) | 1965-12-08 | Louisiana Tech | 4 |
| F | 44 | (United States) | Whitmore, Tamika | 6' 2" (1.88m) | 215 lb (98kg) | 1977-06-05 | Memphis | 2 |
| F | 23 | (United States) | Wicks, Sue | 6' 3" (1.91m) | 174 lb (79kg) | 1966-11-26 | Rutgers | 4 |

Head coach
(United States) Richie Adubato (William Paterson)
Assistant coaches
(United States) Lisa White
(United States) Jeff House
(United States) Pat Coyle

Legend

- (C) Team captain
- (DP) Unsigned draft pick
- (FA) Free agent
- (S) Suspended
- Injured

== Schedule ==
=== Regular season ===
2001 game log
Total: 21–11 (Home: 13–3; Road: 8–8)
May: 0–1 (Home: 0–0; Road: 0–1)

| Game | Date | Team | Score | High points | High rebounds | High assists | Location Attendance | Record |
|---|---|---|---|---|---|---|---|---|
| 1 | May 31 | @ Miami | L 59–68 | Vickie Johnson (20) | Sue Wicks (9) | Teresa Weatherspoon (7) | American Airlines Arena | 0–1 |

June : 9–3 (Home: 5–1; Road: 4–2)

| Game | Date | Team | Score | High points | High rebounds | High assists | Location Attendance | Record |
|---|---|---|---|---|---|---|---|---|
| 2 | June 2 | Indiana | W 75–58 | Tari Phillips (21) | Tari Phillips (12) | Teresa Weatherspoon (6) | Madison Square Garden | 1–1 |
| 3 | June 4 | Sacramento | L 63–80 | Tari Phillips (19) | Tari Phillips (7) | Teresa Weatherspoon (5) | Madison Square Garden | 1–2 |
| 4 | June 7 | @ Cleveland | L 49–67 | Tari Phillips (16) | Tari Phillips (8) | Teresa Weatherspoon (8) | Gund Arena | 1–3 |
| 5 | June 10 | @ Washington | W 81–80 | Teresa Weatherspoon (16) | Tari Phillips (13) | Crystal Robinson (5) | MCI Center | 2–3 |
| 6 | June 12 | Charlotte | W 79–70 | Tari Phillips (27) | Tari Phillips (5) | Teresa Weatherspoon (7) | Madison Square Garden | 3–3 |
| 7 | June 16 | Washington | W 86–63 | Crystal Robinson (16) | Tari Phillips (10) | Teresa Weatherspoon (7) | Madison Square Garden | 4–3 |
| 8 | June 17 | @ Miami | W 55–48 | Crystal Robinson (13) | Tari Phillips (12) | Nagy; Robinson; Weatherspoon (2) | American Airlines Arena | 5–3 |
| 9 | June 19 | @ Sacramento | W 55–51 | Tamika Whitmore (23) | Vickie Johnson (11) | Teresa Weatherspoon (5) | ARCO Arena | 6–3 |
| 10 | June 21 | @ Phoenix | W 95–70 | Tari Phillips (23) | Lobo; Phillips; Robinson (5) | Teresa Weatherspoon (9) | America West Arena | 7–3 |
| 11 | June 24 | Los Angeles | W 82–69 | Becky Hammon (21) | Teresa Weatherspoon (7) | Teresa Weatherspoon (8) | Madison Square Garden | 8–3 |
| 12 | June 25 | @ Orlando | L 54–67 | Vickie Johnson (23) | Phillips; Wicks (6) | Teresa Weatherspoon (6) | TD Waterhouse Centre | 8–4 |
| 13 | June 30 | Orlando | W 72–60 | Tari Phillips (16) | Tari Phillips (13) | Teresa Weatherspoon (9) | Madison Square Garden | 9–4 |

July : 8–5 (Home: 4–1; Road: 4–4)

| Game | Date | Team | Score | High points | High rebounds | High assists | Location Attendance | Record |
|---|---|---|---|---|---|---|---|---|
| 14 | July 2 | Detroit | W 66–60 | Tari Phillips (16) | Johnson; Phillips (9) | Johnson; Weatherspoon (3) | Madison Square Garden | 10–4 |
| 15 | July 3 | @ Charlotte | L 61–66 | Vickie Johnson (16) | Tari Phillips (12) | Teresa Weatherspoon (5) | Charlotte Coliseum | 10–5 |
| 16 | July 6 | @ Minnesota | W 70–57 | Tari Phillips (20) | Tari Phillips (6) | Teresa Weatherspoon (7) | Target Center | 11–5 |
| 17 | July 8 | @ Indiana | W 58–56 | Tari Phillips (24) | Tari Phillips (13) | Teresa Weatherspoon (9) | Conseco Fieldhouse | 12–5 |
| 18 | July 9 | Indiana | W 72–65 | Tari Phillips (20) | Tari Phillips (14) | Hammon; Weatherspoon (6) | Madison Square Garden | 13–5 |
| 19 | July 11 | Seattle | W 67–53 | Becky Hammon (16) | Teresa Weatherspoon (10) | Hammon; Johnson; Weatherspoon (4) | Madison Square Garden | 14–5 |
| 20 | July 13 | Minnesota | W 67–64 | Teresa Weatherspoon (14) | Phillips; Weatherspoon (5) | Teresa Weatherspoon (6) | Madison Square Garden | 15–5 |
| 21 | July 18 | @ Detroit | W 80–67 | Tari Phillips (20) | Tari Phillips (7) | Teresa Weatherspoon (7) | The Palace of Auburn Hills | 16–5 |
| 22 | July 19 | @ Cleveland | L 60–65 | Crystal Robinson (16) | Sue Wicks (9) | Teresa Weatherspoon (7) | Gund Arena | 16–6 |
| 23 | July 22 | Miami | L 52–68 | Crystal Robinson (15) | Weatherspoon; Whitmore (5) | Vickie Johnson (6) | Madison Square Garden | 16–7 |
| 24 | July 24 | @ Portland | L 68–86 | Phillips; Robinson (18) | Tari Phillips (14) | Teresa Weatherspoon (5) | Rose Garden | 16–8 |
| 25 | July 26 | @ Utah | L 63–71 | Vickie Johnson (19) | Vickie Johnson (7) | Teresa Weatherspoon (8) | Delta Center | 16–9 |
| 26 | July 28 | @ Houston | W 64–61 | Crystal Robinson (15) | Sue Wicks (8) | Teresa Weatherspoon (7) | Compaq Center | 17–9 |

August : 4–2 (Home: 4–1; Road: 0–1)

| Game | Date | Team | Score | High points | High rebounds | High assists | Location Attendance | Record |
|---|---|---|---|---|---|---|---|---|
| 27 | August 1 | Detroit | W 66–63 | Johnson; Phillips (17) | Tari Phillips (10) | Teresa Weatherspoon (10) | Madison Square Garden | 18–9 |
| 28 | August 4 | Cleveland | L 43–58 | Tari Phillips (14) | Phillips; Whitmore (6) | Robinson; Weatherspoon (4) | Madison Square Garden | 18–10 |
| 29 | August 8 | Utah | W 82–63 | Vickie Johnson (18) | Phillips; Whitmore (7) | Teresa Weatherspoon (9) | Madison Square Garden | 19–10 |
| 30 | August 10 | Orlando | W 77–67 | Vickie Johnson (17) | Tari Phillips (10) | Teresa Weatherspoon (7) | Madison Square Garden | 20–10 |
| 31 | August 11 | @ Charlotte | L 60–80 | Tari Phillips (15) | Tari Phillips (6) | Johnson; Robinson; Weatherspoon (4) | Charlotte Coliseum | 20–11 |
| 32 | August 14 | Washington | W 71–56 | Crystal Robinson (15) | Tari Phillips (7) | Teresa Weatherspoon (8) | Madison Square Garden | 21–11 |

2001 season schedule

=== Playoffs ===
2001 playoff game log
First round vs. Miami Sol
Won Series: 2–0

| Game | Date | Team | Score | High points | High rebounds | High assists | Location Attendance | Record |
|---|---|---|---|---|---|---|---|---|
| 1 | August 17 | @ Miami | W 62–46 | Vickie Johnson (18) | Tari Phillips (13) | Teresa Weatherspoon (7) | American Airlines Arena | 1–0 |
| 2 | August 19 | Miami | L 50–53 | Crystal Robinson (13) | Tari Phillips (15) | Vickie Johnson (5) | Madison Square Garden | 1–1 |
| 3 | August 21 | Miami | W 72–61 | Vickie Johnson (22) | Vickie Johnson (7) | Vickie Johnson (6) | Madison Square Garden | 2–1 |

Conference Finals vs. Charlotte Sting
Lost Series: 1–2

| Game | Date | Team | Score | High points | High rebounds | High assists | Location Attendance | Record |
|---|---|---|---|---|---|---|---|---|
| 1 | August 24 | @ Charlotte | W 61–57 | Tari Phillips (14) | Tari Phillips (6) | Vickie Johnson (7) | Charlotte Coliseum | 1–0 |
| 2 | August 26 | Charlotte | L 53–62 | Vickie Johnson (16) | Tari Phillips (7) | Teresa Weatherspoon (6) | Madison Square Garden | 1–1 |
| 3 | August 27 | Charlotte | L 44–48 | Vickie Johnson (13) | Crystal Robinson (6) | Teresa Weatherspoon (4) | Madison Square Garden | 1–2 |

2001 playoff schedule

=== Season standings ===
| Eastern Conference | W | L | PCT | Conf. | GB |
|---|---|---|---|---|---|
| Cleveland Rockers ^{x} | 22 | 10 | .688 | 15–6 | – |
| New York Liberty ^{x} | 21 | 11 | .656 | 13–8 | 1.0 |
| Miami Sol ^{x} | 20 | 12 | .625 | 14–7 | 2.0 |
| Charlotte Sting ^{x} | 18 | 14 | .563 | 15–6 | 4.0 |
| Orlando Miracle ^{o} | 13 | 19 | .406 | 9–12 | 9.0 |
| Indiana Fever ^{o} | 10 | 22 | .313 | 7–14 | 12.0 |
| Detroit Shock ^{o} | 10 | 22 | .313 | 7–14 | 12.0 |
| Washington Mystics ^{o} | 10 | 22 | .313 | 4–17 | 12.0 |

== Statistics ==
Legend
| GP | Games played | GS | Games started | MPG | Minutes per game | RPG | Rebounds per game |
| APG | Assists per game | SPG | Steals per game | BPG | Blocks per game | PPG | Points per game |
| FG% | Field-goal percentage | 3P% | 3-point field-goal percentage | FT% | Free-throw percentage | TO | Turnovers per game |
| PF | Fouls per game | | Team leader | | League leader |

=== Regular season ===
| Player | GP | GS | MPG | FG% | 3P% | FT% | RPG | APG | SPG | BPG | PPG |
|---|---|---|---|---|---|---|---|---|---|---|---|
| Tari Phillips | 32 | 32 | 32.8 | .507 | .000 | .584 | 8.0 | 1.1 | 1.5 | 0.5 | 15.3 |
| Crystal Robinson | 32 | 32 | 30.6 | .461 | .417 | .897 | 2.9 | 2.6 | 1.0 | 0.3 | 10.7 |
| Teresa Weatherspoon | 32 | 32 | 30.4 | .431 | .385 | .671 | 3.7 | 6.3 | 1.7 | 0.1 | 6.5 |
| Vickie Johnson | 32 | 32 | 29.3 | .414 | .366 | .757 | 3.3 | 2.7 | 1.1 | 0.1 | 11.0 |
| Tamika Whitmore | 32 | 29 | 23.5 | .432 | .500 | .569 | 3.0 | 0.6 | 0.5 | 0.3 | 7.1 |
| Sue Wicks | 30 | 3 | 20.1 | .469 | .000 | .673 | 4.6 | 1.2 | 1.2 | 1.0 | 5.2 |
| Becky Hammon | 32 | 0 | 19.3 | .457 | .378 | .784 | 1.6 | 1.6 | 0.8 | 0.0 | 8.2 |
| Camille Cooper | 4 | 0 | 12.8 | .667 | N/A | .769 | 2.8 | 0.3 | 0.0 | 0.5 | 6.5 |
| Andrea Nagy | 23 | 0 | 9.3 | .419 | .500 | .500 | 0.4 | 1.0 | 0.1 | 0.1 | 1.5 |
| Katarina Lazić | 8 | 0 | 6.9 | .400 | .000 | .500 | 0.8 | 0.4 | 0.4 | 0.0 | 2.1 |
| Rebecca Lobo | 16 | 0 | 5.3 | .318 | .500 | .500 | 0.9 | 0.1 | 0.1 | 0.0 | 1.1 |
| Grace Daley | 15 | 0 | 4.4 | .476 | .000 | .556 | 0.5 | 0.7 | 0.5 | 0.1 | 1.7 |
| Stacey Ford | 1 | 0 | 3.0 | 1.000 | N/A | N/A | 1.0 | 0.0 | 0.0 | 0.0 | 2.0 |
| Hajdana Radunović | 4 | 0 | 2.3 | .500 | N/A | 1.000 | 1.0 | 0.0 | 0.0 | 0.3 | 1.0 |
| Mactabene Amachree | 2 | 0 | 1.5 | N/A | N/A | .500 | 0.5 | 0.0 | 0.0 | 0.5 | 0.5 |

^{‡}Waived/Released during the season
^{†}Traded during the season
^{≠}Acquired during the season
