= 2002–03 EuroCup Women =

Inaugural season of EuroCup Women

EuroCup Women
- Season: 2002–03
- Duration: 4 October 2002 – 27 April 2003
- Games played: 200
- Teams: 53

Finals
- Champions: (France) Aix-en-Provence BB (1st title)
- Runners-up: (Spain) Caja Rural de Canarias

Statistical leaders
Points	(Serbia) Mila Nikolić	21.6
Rebounds	(United States) Michele Van Gorp	11.7
Assists	(Spain) Elena Álamo	6.9

The 2002–03 EuroCup Women was the first edition of FIBA Europe's second-tier international competition for women's basketball clubs under such name.

== Regional qualifying round ==
=== Conference North ===
==== Group A ====
Pos	Team	Pld	W	L	PF	PA	PD	Pts	Qualification	DYN	ZAP	SZO	KOS	POS
1	(Russia) WBC Dynamo Moscow	8	6	2	645	593	+52	14	Paneuropean phase	—	92–66	71–63	69–58	90–87
2	(Ukraine) Kozachka-Zalk Zaporozhye	8	5	3	556	501	+55	13		74–65	—	60–53	87–49	92–69
3	(Hungary) Szolnoki MÁV-Coop	8	5	3	532	512	+20	13		91–85	63–58	—	63–42	65–60
4	(Slovakia) Delta VODS Košice	8	2	6	498	554	−56	10		65–71	61–54	67–69	—	76–55
5	(Poland) Quay-POSiR Poznań	8	2	6	564	635	−71	10		89–102	49–65	69–65	86–80	—

Source: FIBA.com
Rules for classification: 1) Points; 2) Head-to-head record; 3) Head-to-head point differential. 4) General point differential 5) Points scored

==== Group B ====
Pos	Team	Pld	W	L	PF	PA	PD	Pts	Qualification	PRA	BSE	DYN	WED
1	(Czech Republic) USK Blex Prague	6	4	2	479	354	+125	10	Paneuropean phase	—	82–73	95–53	110–50
2	(Hungary) BSE-ESMA	6	4	2	494	420	+74	10		71–64	—	91–75	112–62
3	(Russia) Dynamo Kursk	6	3	3	409	445	−36	9		60–58	76–70	—	72–52
4	(Germany) SC Rist Wedel	6	1	5	351	514	−163	7		47–70	61–77	79–73	—

Source: FIBA.com
Rules for classification: 1) Points; 2) Head-to-head record; 3) Head-to-head point differential. 4) General point differential 5) Points scored

==== Group C ====
Pos	Team	Pld	W	L	PF	PA	PD	Pts	Qualification	VBM	SOP	POL	TRU
1	(Russia) VBM-SGAU	6	5	1	473	368	+105	11	Paneuropean phase	—	90–70	83–63	96–45
2	(Hungary) Soproni Postas	6	4	2	443	426	+17	10		77–68	—	78–66	59–63
3	(Poland) CCC Aquapark Polkowice	6	2	4	380	429	−49	8		48–63	66–80	—	61–51
4	(Czech Republic) VČE Loko Trutnov	6	1	5	371	444	−73	7		65–73	73–79	74–76	—

Source: FIBA.com
Rules for classification: 1) Points; 2) Head-to-head record; 3) Head-to-head point differential. 4) General point differential 5) Points scored

==== Group D ====
Pos	Team	Pld	W	L	PF	PA	PD	Pts	Qualification	VOL	MIS	COP	DOR
1	(Russia) Chevakata Vologda	6	5	1	468	390	+78	11	Paneuropean phase	—	69–56	79–56	94–64
2	(Hungary) DKSK Miskolc	6	4	2	463	407	+56	10		88–66	—	93–72	87–64
3	(Denmark) BF Copenhagen	6	2	4	397	430	−33	8		76–80	77–71	—	56–46
4	(Germany) BG Dorsten	6	1	5	344	445	−101	7		50–80	59–68	61–60	—

Source: FIBA.com
Rules for classification: 1) Points; 2) Head-to-head record; 3) Head-to-head point differential. 4) General point differential 5) Points scored

=== Conference West ===
==== Group A ====
Pos	Team	Pld	W	L	PF	PA	PD	Pts	Qualification	BOR	CHI	MAD	MIJ
1	(France) W Bordeaux Basket	6	5	1	438	370	+68	11	Paneuropean phase	—	71–62	70–49	86–45
2	(Italy) CUS Chieti	6	4	2	467	401	+66	10		62–63	—	79–61	85–47
3	(Portugal) CAB Madeira	6	3	3	418	420	−2	9		78–68	76–81	—	90–64
4	(Netherlands) NBT Mijdrecht	6	0	6	371	503	−132	6		74–80	83–98	58–64	—

Source: FIBA.com
Rules for classification: 1) Points; 2) Head-to-head record; 3) Head-to-head point differential. 4) General point differential 5) Points scored

==== Group B ====
Pos	Team	Pld	W	L	PF	PA	PD	Pts	Qualification	AIX	ALE	WEL	SAN
1	(France) Aix-en-Provence Basket-ball Féminin	6	5	1	444	350	+94	11	Paneuropean phase	—	86–72	81–63	82–53
2	(Italy) Delta Basket Alessandria	6	5	1	414	372	+42	11	Paneuropean phase	61–52	—	65–42	70–60
3	(Austria) Gustino Schnitzlplatz'l Remus	6	2	4	403	398	+5	8		53–62	64–69	—	95–54
4	(Portugal) Santarém Basket	6	0	6	350	491	−141	6		48–81	68–77	67–86	—

Source: FIBA.com
Rules for classification: 1) Points; 2) Head-to-head record; 3) Head-to-head point differential. 4) General point differential 5) Points scored

==== Group C ====
Pos	Team	Pld	W	L	PF	PA	PD	Pts	Qualification	MON	TAR	OLI
1	(France) USO Mondeville Basket	4	3	1	336	241	+95	7	Paneuropean phase	—	73–64	108–63
2	(Italy) Taranto Cras Basket	4	3	1	284	247	+37	7		66–61	—	80–56
3	(Portugal) Olivais Coimbra Euro 2004	4	0	4	224	356	−132	4		48–94	57–74	—

Source: FIBA.com
Rules for classification: 1) Points; 2) Head-to-head record; 3) Head-to-head point differential. 4) General point differential 5) Points scored

==== Group D ====
Pos	Team	Pld	W	L	PF	PA	PD	Pts	Qualification	CAN	NAM	REI	RHO
1	(Spain) Caja Rural de Canarias	6	5	1	472	387	+85	11	Paneuropean phase	—	59–49	84–60	93–58
2	(Belgium) Dexia Namur	6	4	2	445	392	+53	10		78–64	—	79–69	94–63
3	(France) Reims Saint-Jacques	6	2	4	428	432	−4	8		73–82	84–66	—	71–47
4	(United Kingdom) Rhondda Rebels	6	1	5	364	498	−134	7		69–90	53–79	74–71	—

Source: FIBA.com
Rules for classification: 1) Points; 2) Head-to-head record; 3) Head-to-head point differential. 4) General point differential 5) Points scored

=== Conference South ===
==== Group A ====
Pos	Team	Pld	W	L	PF	PA	PD	Pts	MAC	BOT	BUR	BNE
1	(Israel) Maccabi Ramat Chen Blich	6	6	0	497	395	+102	12	—	73–69	93–54	104–66
2	(Turkey) Botaş Spor Club Adana	6	3	3	468	452	+16	9	59–65	—	70–57	84–71
3	(Bulgaria) Lukoil Neftochimic Burgas	6	2	4	422	475	−53	8	77–79	95–88	—	75–63
4	(Israel) Bne Yehuda Ziontronics	6	1	5	443	508	−65	7	70–83	91–98	82–64	—

Source: FIBA.com
Rules for classification: 1) Points; 2) Head-to-head record; 3) Head-to-head point differential. 4) General point differential 5) Points scored

==== Group B ====
Pos	Team	Pld	W	L	PF	PA	PD	Pts	RAM	ATH	MAC	CRV
1	(Israel) Yes Ramat Hasharon	6	5	1	433	381	+52	11	—	75–53	69–64	71–78
2	(Greece) AO Astir Exarchion Athens	6	3	3	333	335	−2	9	55–67	—	62–47	59–52
3	(Israel) Maccabi Ra'anana	6	2	4	343	393	−50	8	59–69	28–57	—	66–59
4	(Serbia) BC Red Star Belgrade	6	2	4	404	404	0	8	72–82	66–47	77–79	—

Source: FIBA.com
Rules for classification: 1) Points; 2) Head-to-head record; 3) Head-to-head point differential. 4) General point differential 5) Points scored

==== Group C ====
Pos	Team	Pld	W	L	PF	PA	PD	Pts	Qualification	VRS	ANO	ERD	CRO
1	(Serbia) KK Hemofarm Vršac	6	5	1	545	368	+177	11	Paneuropean phase	—	100–78	94–56	111–51
2	(Greece) Ano Liosia Basketball	6	5	1	493	384	+109	11	Paneuropean phase	72–57	—	80–58	87–53
3	(Turkey) Erdemirspor Kulübü	6	2	4	414	480	−66	8		61–85	68–85	—	95–70
4	ŽKK Croatia Zagreb	6	0	6	338	558	−220	6		50–98	48–91	66–76	—

Source: FIBA.com
Rules for classification: 1) Points; 2) Head-to-head record; 3) Head-to-head point differential. 4) General point differential 5) Points scored

==== Group D ====
Pos	Team	Pld	W	L	PF	PA	PD	Pts	Qualification	SLA	VOJ	GLY
1	(Bulgaria) Slavia Sofia	4	2	2	269	259	+10	6	Paneuropean phase	—	70–61	73–57
2	(Serbia) ŽKK Vojvodina Nis Gas Novi Sad	4	2	2	257	261	−4	6		73–62	—	62–58
3	(Greece) ANO Glyfada	4	2	2	254	260	−6	6		68–64	71–61	—

Source: FIBA.com
Rules for classification: 1) Points; 2) Head-to-head record; 3) Head-to-head point differential. 4) General point differential 5) Points scored

==== Group E ====
Pos	Team	Pld	W	L	PF	PA	PD	Pts	Qualification	ELE	JEZ	TAR
1	(Croatia) KK Elemes	4	2	2	265	250	+15	6	Paneuropean phase	—	78–74	69–48
2	(Slovenia) WBC Ježica Ljubljana	4	2	2	282	274	+8	6		74–71	—	68–57
3	(Romania) Livas Petrom Târgoviște	4	2	2	227	250	−23	6		54–47	68–66	—

Source: FIBA.com
Rules for classification: 1) Points; 2) Head-to-head record; 3) Head-to-head point differential. 4) General point differential 5) Points scored

==== Group F ====
Pos	Team	Pld	W	L	PF	PA	PD	Pts	Qualification	APO	PLO	LUF
1	(Greece) Apollon Ptolemaida	4	3	1	279	260	+19	7	Paneuropean phase	—	77–72	64–53
2	(Bulgaria) Academic Test Plovdiv	4	2	2	269	258	+11	6		66–65	—	74–58
3	(Albania) Luftëtari Club	4	1	3	238	268	−30	5		69–73	58–57	—

Source: FIBA.com
Rules for classification: 1) Points; 2) Head-to-head record; 3) Head-to-head point differential. 4) General point differential 5) Points scored

== Paneuropean phase ==
=== Qualifying round ===
==== Group A ====
Pos	Team	Pld	W	L	PF	PA	PD	Pts	Qualification	VBM	BOR	PRA	ELE
1	(Russia) VBM-SGAU	6	5	1	547	423	+124	11	Play-offs	—	87–58	95–65	114–75
2	(France) W Bordeaux Basket	6	3	3	424	432	−8	9	Play-offs	85–82	—	72–53	75–63
3	(Czech Republic) USK Blex Prague	6	3	3	422	437	−15	9		69–77	70–62	—	80–67
4	(Croatia) KK Elemes	6	1	5	417	518	−101	7		71–92	77–72	64–85	—

Source: FIBA.com
Rules for classification: 1) Points; 2) Head-to-head record; 3) Head-to-head point differential. 4) General point differential 5) Points scored

==== Group B ====
Pos	Team	Pld	W	L	PF	PA	PD	Pts	Qualification	ANO	ALE	VOL
1	(Greece) Ano Liosia Basketball	4	4	0	332	290	+42	8	Play-offs	—	79–77	86–71
2	(Italy) Delta Basket Alessandria	4	1	3	288	277	+11	5	Play-offs	74–78	—	76–52
3	(Russia) Chevakata Vologda	4	1	3	259	312	−53	5		68–89	68–61	—

Source: FIBA.com
Rules for classification: 1) Points; 2) Head-to-head record; 3) Head-to-head point differential. 4) General point differential 5) Points scored

==== Group C ====
Pos	Team	Pld	W	L	PF	PA	PD	Pts	Qualification	AIX	DYN	SLA
1	(France) Aix-en-Provence Basket-ball Féminin	4	4	0	328	268	+60	8	Play-offs	—	74–59	102–64
2	(Russia) WBC Dynamo Moscow	4	1	3	286	298	−12	5	Play-offs	83–87	—	74–54
3	(Bulgaria) Slavia Sofia	4	1	3	263	311	−48	5		62–65	83–70	—

Source: FIBA.com
Rules for classification: 1) Points; 2) Head-to-head record; 3) Head-to-head point differential. 4) General point differential 5) Points scored

==== Group D ====
Pos	Team	Pld	W	L	PF	PA	PD	Pts	Qualification	CAN	VRS	MON	APO
1	(Spain) Caja Rural de Canarias	6	3	3	461	416	+45	9	Play-offs	—	79–54	86–79	67–44
2	(Serbia) KK Hemofarm Vršac	6	3	3	429	423	+6	9	Play-offs	82–77	—	88–70	90–70
3	(France) USO Mondeville Basket	6	3	3	416	432	−16	9		79–78	62–55	—	65–59
4	(Greece) Apollon Ptolemaida	6	3	3	382	417	−35	9		78–74	65–60	66–61	—

Source: FIBA.com
Rules for classification: 1) Points; 2) Head-to-head record; 3) Head-to-head point differential. 4) General point differential 5) Points scored

=== Play-offs ===
Team 1	Agg.	Team 2	1st leg	2nd leg
KK Hemofarm Vršac (Serbia)	131–154	(Russia) VBM-SGAU	59–70	72–84
W Bordeaux Basket (France)	140–146	(Spain) Caja Rural de Canarias	66–60	74–86
Delta Basket Alessandria (Italy)	144–149	(France) Aix-en-Provence BB	64–69	80–80
WBC Dynamo Moscow (Russia)	127–131	(Greece) Ano Liosia Basketball	59–60	68–71

=== Final Four ===
==== Semifinals ====
Team 1	Score	Team 2
Caja Rural de Canarias (Spain)	86–64	(Russia) VBM-SGAU
Aix-en-Provence BB (France)	72–70	(Greece) Ano Liosia Basketball

==== Third place game ====
Team 1	Score	Team 2
Ano Liosia Basketball (Greece)	70–84	(Russia) VBM-SGAU

==== Final ====
Team 1	Score	Team 2
Aix-en-Provence BB (France)	80–71	(Spain) Caja Rural de Canarias

== See also ==
- 2002–03 EuroLeague Women
