= British Women's Basketball Championship =

- Sport: Basketball
- Founded: 1965
- First season: 1965-66
- Folded: 2014
- Country: United Kingdom
- Continent: FIBA Europe (Europe)
- Last champion: City of Sheffield Hatters (15 title)
- Level on pyramid: 1
- Website: englandbasketball.co.uk

British Women's Basketball Championship (born British Basketball League Women) - Women's basketball tournament teams UK. The first draw took place in 1965, which was the team of champions from London "Malory." Most titles - 15 counts in City of Sheffield Hatters from Sheffield.

== Champions ==
Year	Place	Champion	Result	Runner up
1965	Harrow	Malory	42 : 24	Sheffield Hatters
1966	Stoke-on-Trent	Malory	45 : 28	London Unicorns
1967	Harrow	Malory	50 : 48	London Unicorns
1968	Bracknell	Abbey Wood	2 – 0	Malory
1969	Bracknell	Malory	59 : 41	Saint Mary’s
1970	Bracknell	Abbey Wood	65 : 53	Eston Tigers
1971	Leeds	Abbey Wood	45 : 41	Turnford Tigers
1972	Leeds	Turnford Tigers	59 : 50	Abbey Wood
1973	Bracknell	Turnford Tigers	73 : 64	Eston Eagles
1974	Walsall	Eston Eagles	56 : 37	Turnford Tigers
1975	Edmonton	Cleveland Eagles	48 : 44	Turnford Tigers
1976	Edmonton	Turnford Tigers	47 : 40	Cleveland Eagles
1977	Wembley	Turnford Tigers	64 : 62	Cleveland Eagles
1978	Wembley	Turnford Tigers	60 : 59	Cleveland Eagles
1979	Hinckley	Turnford Tigers	65 : 50	Corvus Luton
1980	Wembley	Turnford Tigers	91 : 48	Corvus Luton
1981	Wembley	Southgate	59 : 48	Crystal Palace
1982	Wembley	Southgate	67 : 61	Northampton
1983	Wembley	Southgate	55 : 53	Northampton
1984	Wembley	Northampton	75 : 59	Nottingham
1985	Wembley	Northampton	93 : 68	Crystal Palace
1986	Wembley	Crystal Palace	73 : 65	Northampton
1987	Wembley	Northampton	69 : 65	London YMCA
1988	Wembley	Stockport	78 : 66	Northampton
1989	Birmingham	Northampton	66 : 65	Stockport
1990	Birmingham	Northampton	70 : 68	Sheffield Hatters
1991	Birmingham	Crystal Palace	56 : 52	Northampton
1992	Wembley	Thames Valley Tigers	56 : 54	Sheffield Hatters
1993	Wembley	Sheffield Hatters	64 : 63	Northampton
1994	Wembley	Thames Valley Tigers	60 : 56	Sheffield Hatters
1995	Wembley	Sheffield Hatters	76 : 65	Barking & Dagenham
1996	Wembley	Sheffield Hatters	73 : 62	Birmingham QC
1997	Wembley	Sheffield Hatters	72 : 50	Thames Valley Tigers
1998	Manchester	Sheffield Hatters	66 : 63	Thames Valley Tigers
1999	Guildford	Sheffield Hatters	63 : 60	Thames Valley Tigers
2000	Wembley	Sheffield Hatters	64 : 50	Spelthorne Acers
2001	Wembley	Rhondda Rebels		Sheffield Hatters
2002	Coventry	Sheffield Hatters	74 : 60	Rhondda Rebels
2003	Birmingham	Sheffield Hatters	62 : 56	Rhondda Rebels
2004	Birmingham	Sheffield Hatters	72 : 61	Rhondda Rebels
2005	Birmingham	Rhondda Rebels	64 : 58	Sheffield Hatters
2006	Birmingham	Rhondda Rebels	79 : 67	Sheffield Hatters
2007	Newcastle upon Tyne	Sheffield Hatters	76 : 63	Rhondda Rebels
2008	Sheffield	Rhondda Rebels	72 : 70	Sheffield Hatters
2009	Manchester	Sheffield Hatters	81 : 48	Cardiff Archers
2010	Manchester	Cardiff Archers	56 : 52	Sheffield Hatters
2011	Manchester	Sheffield Hatters	91 : 69	Cardiff Archers
2012	Manchester	Sheffield Hatters	93 : 72	Cardiff Archers
2013	Manchester	Sheffield Hatters	70 : 57	Barking Abbey
2014	Manchester	Loughborough	68 : 63	Sheffield Hatters
