= Begoña García =

Begoña García may refer to:

- Begoña García Piñero (born 1976), Spanish basketball player
- Begoña García Grau (born 1995), Spanish field hockey player
