= Mila Nikolich =

Serbian basketball player (born 1971)

Personal information
- Born: 7 April 1971 (age 54) SR Serbia, Yugoslavia
- Listed height: 190 cm (6 ft 3 in)
- Listed weight: 83 kg (183 lb)

Career information
- College: Abilene Christian
- Playing career: 1999–2004
- Position: Forward
- Number: 24

Career history
- 1999: Houston Comets
- 2000: Portland Fire

Career highlights
- WNBA champion (1999)
- Stats at WNBA.com
- Stats at Basketball Reference

Mila Nikolich (also spelled Nikolić; born 7 April 1971), is a Serbian former professional basketball player. She played for the Abilene Christian Wildcats at the collegiate level. Later, she played for the Houston Comets of the Women's National Basketball Association (WNBA), with who she won a WNBA championship with. She then played overseas.

== Career ==
Nikolich college basketball in the United States for the Abilene Christian Wildcats. She later played professional basketball. During the 1998–99 season, she played professional basketball in the Canary Islands.

She went undrafted in the WNBA draft, but was signed by the Houston Comets in the midst of their dynasty at the beginning of the WNBA's history. She played for the Comets in 1999, winning the 1999 WNBA Finals with them. A forward, she saw little playing time during the season. She played seven games for the Comets, averaging 1.4 points per game.

On 28 January 2000, the Comets traded her to Portland Fire for Coquese Washington. She never played for the Fire, and would play professional basketball in various European countries during her career, including in Spain, Poland, Russia, and France; she also played in South Korea. Outside of the WNBA, she developed a reputation as a scorer, having led many competitions in scoring. In 2000, she played professional basketball for WBC Ramat HaSharon of the EuroLeague Women competition. She then played the 2000–01 season for Lotos Gdyni. In 2003, she played for Ros Casares. She played for Serbia in the 2002–03 EuroCup Women tournament. In 2003, she also played for Liga Femenina's CB Puig d'en Valls. Her contract with the team was terminated in January 2004.

== Career statistics ==
Year	Team	GP	GS	MPG	FG%	3P%	FT%	RPG	APG	SPG	BPG	TO	PPG
1999	Houston	7	0	4.1	.364	.250	.500	.7	.1	.0	.0	.4	1.4
Career	1 year, 1 team	7	0	4.1	.364	.250	.500	.7	.1	.0	.0	.4	1.4

== See also ==
- List of Serbian WNBA players
- List of WNBA players born outside the United States
