= 1999 Minnesota Lynx season =

- Head coach: Brian Agler
- Arena: Target Center

Results
- Record: 15–17 (.469)
- Place: 5th (Eastern)
- Playoff finish: Did not qualify

The 1999 Minnesota Lynx season was the 1st season for the Minnesota Lynx of the Women's National Basketball Association, and the first season under head coach Brian Agler.

The season tipped-off on June 12, 1999, against the Shock.

The Lynx finished in 5th in the Western Conference with a record of 15-17 but missed the playoffs in their first season.

== Transactions ==
=== WNBA expansion draft ===
Player	Nationality	Former WNBA Team
Brandy Reed	United States	Phoenix Mercury
Kim Williams	United States	Utah Starzz
Octavia Blue	United States	Los Angeles Sparks
Adia Barnes	United States	Sacramento Monarchs

=== WNBA allocation draft ===
Player	Nationality	School/Team/Country
Kristin Folkl	United States	Stanford
Katie Smith	United States	Columbus Quest

=== WNBA draft ===
Round	Pick	Player	Nationality	School/Team/Country
1	7	Tonya Edwards	United States	Columbus Quest
2	19	Trisha Fallon	Australia	Sydney Flames (Australia)
3	31	Andrea Lloyd-Curry	United States	Columbus Quest
4	43	Sonja Tate	United States	Columbus Quest
4	49	Angie Potthoff	United States	Columbus Quest

=== Transactions ===
Date	Transaction
November 17, 1998	Hired Brian Agler as Head Coach
April 6, 1999	Drafted Brandy Reed, Kim Williams, Octavia Blue and Adia Barnes in the 1999 WNBA expansion Draft
May 3, 1999	Drafted Kristin Folkl and Katie Smith in the 1999 WNBA Allocation Draft
May 4, 1999	Drafted Tonya Edwards, Trisha Fallon, Andrea Lloyd-Curry, Sonja Tate and Angie Potthoff in the 1999 WNBA draft
May 14, 1999	Signed Charmin Smith, DeMya Walker, Itoro Umoh-Coleman and Jamie Redd
May 17, 1999	Waived Jamie Redd
June 8, 1999	Waived DeMya Walker and Itoro Umoh-Coleman
May 21, 1999	Waived Octavia Blue
May 26, 1999	Signed Annie La Fleur
June 8, 1999	Waived Kim Williams
October 27, 1999	Traded Adia Barnes, Tonya Edwards and Trisha Fallon to the Phoenix Mercury in exchange for Marlies Askamp, Kristi Harrower and Angela Aycock

== Roster ==
1999 Minnesota Lynx roster
Players
Coaches

Pos.	No.	Nat.	Name	Height	Weight	DOB	From	Yrs
F	32	(United States)	Barnes, Adia	5' 11" (1.8m)	165 lb (75kg)	1977-02-03	Arizona	1
G	13	(United States)	Edwards, Tonya	5' 10" (1.78m)	160 lb (73kg)	1968-03-13	Tennessee	R
G/F	9	(Australia)	Fallon, Trisha	6' 3" (1.91m)	175 lb (79kg)	1972-07-23		R
F	24	(United States)	Folkl, Kristin	6' 2" (1.88m)	190 lb (86kg)	1975-12-19	Stanford	R
G	35	(Australia)	La Fleur, Annie	5' 7" (1.7m)	141 lb (64kg)	1969-03-10		R
F	5	(United States)	Lloyd-Curry, Andrea	6' 2" (1.88m)	175 lb (79kg)	1965-09-25	Texas	R
F	44	(United States)	Potthoff, Angie	6' 1" (1.85m)	191 lb (87kg)	1974-06-12	Penn State	R
F	3	(United States)	Reed, Brandy	6' 1" (1.85m)	168 lb (76kg)	1977-02-17	Southern Miss	1
G	21	(United States)	Smith, Charmin	5' 10" (1.78m)	145 lb (66kg)	1975-05-02	Stanford	R
G	14	(United States)	Smith, Katie	5' 11" (1.8m)	175 lb (79kg)	1974-06-04	Ohio State	R
G	19	(United States)	Tate, Sonja	5' 7" (1.7m)	157 lb (71kg)	1971-09-07	Arkansas State	R

Head coach
(United States) Brian Agler (Wittenberg)
Assistant coaches
(United States) Kelly Kramer
(United States) Heidi VanDerveer

Legend

- (C) Team captain
- (DP) Unsigned draft pick
- (FA) Free agent
- (S) Suspended
- Injured

== Schedule ==
=== Regular season ===
1999 game log
Total: 15–17 (Home: 8–8; Road: 7–9)
June: 4–3 (Home: 2–2; Road: 2–1)

Game	Date	Team	Score	High points	High rebounds	High assists	Location Attendance	Record
1	June 12	Detroit	W 68–51	Tonya Edwards (20)	Kristin Folkl (6)	Sonja Tate (7)	Target Center	1–0
2	June 14	Utah	W 78–54	Brandy Reed (16)	Folkl; Reed (7)	Andrea Lloyd-Curry (6)	Target Center	2–0
3	June 19	Houston	L 55–69	Tonya Edwards (19)	Andrea Lloyd-Curry (8)	Andrea Lloyd-Curry (4)	Target Center	2–1
4	June 22	@ Sacramento	L 62–79	Andrea Lloyd-Curry (17)	Sonja Tate (8)	Sonja Tate (4)	ARCO Arena	2–2
5	June 24	@ Los Angeles	W 72–62	Brandy Reed (28)	Sonja Tate (6)	Sonja Tate (5)	Great Western Forum	3–2
6	June 26	@ Utah	W 72–62	Tonya Edwards (23)	Sonja Tate (5)	Brandy Reed (4)	Delta Center	4–2
7	June 29	Sacramento	L 72–86	Katie Smith (21)	Sonja Tate (6)	Sonja Tate (5)	Target Center	4–3

July : 7–7 (Home: 3–4; Road: 4–3)

Game	Date	Team	Score	High points	High rebounds	High assists	Location Attendance	Record
8	July 1	Los Angeles	L 77–81 (2OT)	Brandy Reed (23)	Folkl; Tate (8)	Andrea Lloyd-Curry (6)	Target Center	4–4
9	July 3	Phoenix	W 56–47	Brandy Reed (14)	Brandy Reed (8)	Sonja Tate (4)	Target Center	5–4
10	July 6	@ Houston	L 54–80	Adia Barnes (9)	Katie Smith (6)	Sonja Tate (4)	Compaq Center	5–5
11	July 9	@ Orlando	W 71–66	Tonya Edwards (22)	Brandy Reed (7)	Tonya Edwards (5)	TD Waterhouse Centre	6–5
12	July 11	@ New York	W 58–56	Brandy Reed (19)	Brandy Reed (7)	Reed; K. Smith (4)	Madison Square Garden	7–5
13	July 12	@ Cleveland	L 55–67	Katie Smith (17)	Brandy Reed (8)	Sonja Tate (5)	Gund Arena	7–6
14	July 17	New York	W 60–58	Brandy Reed (20)	Brandy Reed (8)	Reed; Edwards (4)	Target Center	8–6
15	July 19	Sacramento	W 76–69	Brandy Reed (22)	Andrea Lloyd-Curry (8)	Brandy Reed (6)	Target Center	9–6
16	July 19	@ Charlotte	W 76–67	Brandy Reed (26)	Reed; K. Smith (6)	Andrea Lloyd-Curry (11)	Charlotte Coliseum	10–6
17	July 21	Washington	L 55–60	Brandy Reed (28)	Reed; Tate (7)	Katie Smith (5)	Target Center	10–7
18	July 25	Houston	L 57–62	Tonya Edwards (25)	Lloyd-Curry; Reed; Potthoff (6)	Andrea Lloyd-Curry (5)	Target Center	10–8
19	July 27	@ Sacramento	W 61–59	Tonya Edwards (17)	Andrea Lloyd-Curry (8)	Tonya Edwards (8)	ARCO Arena	11–8
20	July 29	@ Phoenix	L 46–79	Brandy Reed (12)	Brandy Reed (9)	Andrea Lloyd-Curry (3)	America West Arena	11–9
21	July 31	Charlotte	L 52–56	Brandy Reed (21)	Brandy Reed (13)	Tonya Edwards (5)	Target Center	11–10

August : 4–7 (Home: 3–2; Road: 1–5)

Game	Date	Team	Score	High points	High rebounds	High assists	Location Attendance	Record
22	August 2	Phoenix	W 73–56	Brandy Reed (17)	Andrea Lloyd-Curry (9)	Sonja Tate (5)	Target Center	12–10
23	August 4	@ Detroit	L 56–59	Brandy Reed (19)	Andrea Lloyd-Curry (9)	Sonja Tate (5)	The Palace of Auburn Hills	12–11
24	August 6	Los Angeles	L 59–77	Edwards; K. Smith (13)	Tonya Edwards (8)	Reed; Potthoff (4)	Target Center	12–12
25	August 7	@ Utah	L 70–80	Brandy Reed (24)	Andrea Lloyd-Curry (6)	Tonya Edwards (5)	Delta Center	12–13
26	August 9	@ Phoenix	L 55–64	Tonya Edwards (18)	Brandy Reed (6)	Tonya Edwards (4)	America West Arena	12–14
27	August 11	Utah	W 83–73	Katie Smith (27)	Tonya Edwards (7)	Andrea Lloyd-Curry (6)	Charlotte Coliseum	13–14
28	August 14	@ Houston	L 53–71	Sonja Tate (15)	Kristin Folkl (9)	La Fleur; Tate (3)	Compaq Center	13–15
29	August 16	Cleveland	W 57–50	Katie Smith (15)	Kristin Folkl (6)	La Fleur; K. Smith (3)	Target Center	14–15
30	August 18	@ Los Angeles	L 54–72	Kristin Folkl (15)	Barnes; La Fleur (5)	Sonja Tate (5)	Great Western Forum	14–16
31	August 20	Orlando	L 80–83 (OT)	Kristin Folkl (21)	Kristin Folkl (9)	Annie La Fleur (7)	Target Center	14–17
32	August 21	@ Washington	W 48–45	Edwards; K. Smith (17)	Kristin Folkl (7)	Tonya Edwards (4)	MCI Center	15–17

1999 season schedule

=== Season standings ===
Western Conference	W	L	PCT	Conf.	GB
Houston Comets ^{x}	26	6	.813	16–4	–
Los Angeles Sparks ^{x}	20	12	.625	12–8	6.0
Sacramento Monarchs ^{x}	19	13	.594	9–11	7.0
Phoenix Mercury ^{o}	15	17	.469	7–13	11.0
Minnesota Lynx ^{o}	15	17	.469	8–12	11.0
Utah Starzz ^{o}	15	17	.469	8–12	11.0

== Statistics ==
Legend
GP	Games played	GS	Games started	MPG	Minutes per game	RPG	Rebounds per game
APG	Assists per game	SPG	Steals per game	BPG	Blocks per game	PPG	Points per game
FG%	Field-goal percentage	3P%	3-point field-goal percentage	FT%	Free-throw percentage	TO	Turnovers per game
PF	Fouls per game		Team leader		League leader

=== Regular season ===
Player	GP	GS	MPG	FG%	3P%	FT%	RPG	APG	SPG	BPG	PPG
Katie Smith	30	29	32.4	.387	.382	.766	2.9	2.0	0.6	0.3	11.7
Tonya Edwards	32	32	32.2	.357	.344	.806	3.5	2.6	0.8	0.4	14.8
Brandy Reed	25	24	30.3	.459	.342	.757	6.0	2.6	1.2	0.7	16.1
Andrea Lloyd-Curry	32	31	28.1	.375	.333	.756	4.3	2.8	0.9	0.4	6.7
Sonja Tate	32	18	25.9	.354	.239	.767	4.0	3.1	1.1	0.1	4.5
Angie Potthoff	32	25	22.2	.379	.167	.545	2.7	1.2	0.8	0.2	4.0
Kristin Folkl	32	1	16.2	.479	.143	.538	3.6	0.7	0.4	0.4	4.9
Annie La Fleur	25	0	13.3	.343	.440	.250	1.5	1.4	0.3	0.0	2.4
Trisha Fallon	26	0	10.8	.300	.353	.742	0.8	0.8	0.4	0.2	3.0
Adia Barnes	19	0	4.8	.304	.333	.500	1.1	0.3	0.3	0.0	1.1
Charmin Smith	13	0	4.3	.111	.000	.800	0.7	0.2	0.1	0.0	0.8

^{‡}Waived/Released during the season
^{†}Traded during the season
^{≠}Acquired during the season

- Tonya Edwards ranked second in the WNBA in Three Point Field Goals with 66
- Katie Smith ranked sixth in the WNBA in Three Point Field Goals, 52
- Katie Smith ranked eighth in the WNBA in Three Point Field Goal Attempts with, 136
- Katie Smith ranked ninth in the WNBA in Three Point Field Goal Percentage, (.382)

== Awards and honors ==
- Tonya Edwards led the WNBA in Three Point Field Goal Attempts with 192
