= Camille Cooper =

American basketball player (born 1979)

Personal information
- Born: February 5, 1979 (age 47)
- Listed height: 6 ft 4 in (1.93 m)

Career information
- High school: Scott County (Georgetown, Kentucky)
- College: Purdue (1997–2001)
- WNBA draft: 2001: 1st round, 16th overall pick
- Drafted by: Los Angeles Sparks
- Position: Center

Career history
- 2001–2002: New York Liberty

Career highlights
- NCAA champion (1999); 2× First-team All-Big Ten (2000, 2001)
- Stats at WNBA.com
- Stats at Basketball Reference

Camille Kaye Cooper (born February 5, 1979) is a former professional basketball player. She played for the New York Liberty in 2001 and 2002. She played a total of 2 games.

== Career statistics ==
Legend
GP	Games played	GS	Games started	MPG	Minutes per game	RPG	Rebounds per game
APG	Assists per game	SPG	Steals per game	BPG	Blocks per game	PPG	Points per game
TO	Turnovers per game	FG%	Field-goal percentage	3P%	3-point field-goal percentage	FT%	Free-throw percentage
**Bold**	Career best	°	League leader

*	Denotes season in which Cooper won an NCAA Championship

=== WNBA ===
==== Regular season ====
WNBA regular season statistics
Year	Team	GP	GS	MPG	FG%	3P%	FT%	RPG	APG	SPG	BPG	TO	PPG
2001	New York	4	0	**12.8**	**.667**	—	**.769**	**2.8**	**0.3**	0.0	**0.5**	0.8	**6.5**
2002	New York	**23**	**1**	5.2	.393	—	.625	0.7	0.1	**0.2**	0.2	**0.4**	1.2
**Career**	2 years, 1 team	27	1	6.3	.475	—	.714	1.0	0.1	0.1	0.3	0.5	2.0

=== Playoffs ===
WNBA playoff statistics
Year	Team	GP	GS	MPG	FG%	3P%	FT%	RPG	APG	SPG	BPG	TO	PPG
2001	New York	**3**	0	2.7	.000	—	—	0.3	0.0	0.0	0.0	**0.0**	0.0
2002	New York	**3**	0	**5.0**	**.500**	—	**.500**	**0.7**	0.0	**0.7**	0.0	0.7	**1.0**
**Career**	2 years, 1 team	6	0	3.8	.250	—	.500	0.5	0.0	0.3	0.0	0.3	0.5

=== College ===
NCAA statistics
Year	Team	GP	Points	FG%	FT%	RPG	APG	SPG	BPG	PPG
1997–98	Purdue	33	219	59.6%	40.5%	3.3	0.1	0.4	1.2	6.6
1998–99 *	Purdue	35	341	**64.2%**	50.0%	4.9	0.1	0.5	1.5	9.7
1999–00	Purdue	31	474	58.2%	**61.2%**	**7.5**	0.2	**0.8**	1.2	**15.3**
2000–01	Purdue	**38**	**541**	61.5%	58.7%	6.5	**0.6**	0.6	**1.7**	14.2
**Career**		137	1575	60.8%	53.7%	5.5	0.3	0.5	1.4	11.5

== Personal life ==
After basketball, Cooper became an attorney.
