= Andrea Lloyd-Curry =

American basketball player (born 1965)

Andrea Lloyd
Personal information
- Born: September 2, 1965 (age 61) Moscow, Idaho, U.S.
- Listed height: 6 ft 2 in (1.88 m)
- Listed weight: 175 lb (79 kg)

Career information
- High school: Moscow (Moscow, Idaho)
- College: Texas (1983–1987)
- WNBA draft: 1999: 3rd round, 31st overall pick
- Drafted by: Minnesota Lynx
- Position: Forward

Career history
- 1996–1998: Columbus Quest
- 1999–2000: Minnesota Lynx

Career highlights
- NCAA champion (1986); Kodak All-American (1987)
- Stats at Basketball Reference
- Women's Basketball Hall of Fame
Medals
Women's basketball
Representing the United States
Olympic Games
Gold medal – first place	1988 Seoul	Team competition
World University Games
Gold medal – first place	1985 Kobe	Team competition
Pan American Games
Gold medal – first place	1987 Indianapolis	Team
Bronze medal – third place	1991 Havana	Team
FIBA World Championship for Women
Bronze medal – third place	1994 Sydney	Team Competition

Andrea Lane Lloyd (born September 2, 1965) is an American former professional basketball player, a 2007 inductee into the Women's Basketball Hall of Fame, and previous television analyst for the Minnesota Lynx. Currently she is working as a television analyst for the MTN sports network with the Mountain West Conference.

== Early years ==
Born in Moscow, Idaho, Lloyd moved to Alaska with her family at age 12 and moved back to Moscow three years later, in the middle of her sophomore year. A three-time Idaho high school player of the year, she led Moscow High School to state championships in 1981 and 1982; she graduated in 1983 and was a Parade magazine All-American.

Lloyd played college basketball at the University of Texas in Austin, where she was one of the top players in the nation. As a junior, she helped lead the Longhorns to an undefeated season and a national title in 1986. In her senior season, defending champion Texas, under head coach Jody Conradt, had only one loss entering the 1987 tournament, but fell in the Final Four to runner-up Louisiana Tech.

== USA Basketball ==
Prior to her junior year at Texas, Lloyd played for the USA team at the 1985 World University Games in Kobe, Japan. The team brought home a silver medal, after falling to the USSR. Team USA trailed by 18 points at one time, mounted a comeback attempt but fell short, losing 87–81. Lloyd averaged 6.0 points per game.

Lloyd won gold at the 1988 Olympics in Seoul, Korea, as a member of the USA women's basketball team. She was also a member of the USA team for the Pan American Games in both 1987 and 1991, winning gold and bronze medals, respectively.

Lloyd was named to the USA national team and competed in the 1994 World Championships, held in June 1994 in Sydney, Australia. The team was coached by Tara VanDerveer, and won their first six games, when they faced Brazil. In a closely contested, high scoring game, Brazil hit ten of ten free throws in the final minute to secure a 110–107 victory. The USA won a close final game against Australia 100–95 to earn the bronze medal. Lloyd averaged 8.3 points per game.

== Professional career ==
Lloyd-Curry played in the American Basketball League with the Columbus Quest from 1996 through 1998. With the dissolution of that league, she began her WNBA career with the Minnesota Lynx in 1999. She tore the anterior cruciate ligament in her left knee in 2000 on June 30, which effectively ended her playing career.

== WNBA career statistics ==
Legend
GP	Games played	GS	Games started	MPG	Minutes per game	RPG	Rebounds per game
APG	Assists per game	SPG	Steals per game	BPG	Blocks per game	PPG	Points per game
TO	Turnovers per game	FG%	Field-goal percentage	3P%	3-point field-goal percentage	FT%	Free-throw percentage
**Bold**	Career best	°	League leader

=== Regular season ===
Year	Team	GP	GS	MPG	FG%	3P%	FT%	RPG	APG	SPG	BPG	TO	PPG
1999	Minnesota	32	31	28.1	.375	.333	.756	4.3	2.8	0.9	0.4	1.9	6.7
2000	Minnesota	14	2	23.8	.382	.344	.706	3.1	1.6	0.9	0.1	1.7	5.4
Career	2 years, 1 team	46	33	26.8	.377	.336	.742	3.9	2.5	0.9	0.3	1.9	6.3

== Post-playing career ==
In 2020, Lloyd was named a television analyst for Texas Longhorns women's basketball games on Longhorn Network.
