= Sonja Tate =

American basketball player and coach (born 1971)

Personal information
- Born: September 7, 1971 (age 55)
- Listed height: 5 ft 6 in (1.68 m)
- Listed weight: 157 lb (71 kg)

Career information
- High school: West Memphis (West Memphis, Arkansas)
- College: Arkansas State
- WNBA draft: 1999: 4th round, 43rd overall pick
- Drafted by: Minnesota Lynx
- Playing career: 1996–2000
- Position: Guard

Career history
- 1996-1998: Columbus Quest
- 1999-2000: Minnesota Lynx

Career highlights
- 2x All-Sun Belt Team (1992, 1993); Sun Belt Player of the Year (1993)
- Stats at WNBA.com
- Stats at Basketball Reference

Sonja Patrice Tate (born September 7, 1971) is an American basketball coach and former player. She played for Columbus Quest of the American Basketball League, where she won championships over each of her two seasons. She then played for the Minnesota Lynx of the WNBA for two seasons (1999-2000).

She played college basketball for the Arkansas State University Red Wolves. At ASU, she scored 2,312 points, which is the most of any basketball player in school history.

She is originally from Crittenden County, Arkansas and is a member of the Arkansas Sports Hall of Fame. In 2015, she was hired to coach the Arkansas State University Mid-South. In 2016–17, she led the team to a regional championship. In 2019, she was hired to coach at Paragould High School. However she would be placed on Administrative leave on December 9th, 2024 for accusations of hitting a student.

== WNBA career statistics ==
Legend
GP	Games played	GS	Games started	MPG	Minutes per game	RPG	Rebounds per game
APG	Assists per game	SPG	Steals per game	BPG	Blocks per game	PPG	Points per game
TO	Turnovers per game	FG%	Field-goal percentage	3P%	3-point field-goal percentage	FT%	Free-throw percentage
**Bold**	Career best	°	League leader

=== Regular season ===
Year	Team	GP	GS	MPG	FG%	3P%	FT%	RPG	APG	SPG	BPG	TO	PPG
1999	Minnesota	**32**	**18**	**25.9**	.354	.239	**.767**	**4.0**	**3.1**	**1.1**	**0.1**	2.0	**4.5**
2000	Minnesota	8	0	11.8	**.455**	**.545**	.500	1.6	0.6	0.4	0.0	0.9	3.4
Career	2 years, 1 team	40	18	23.1	.367	.282	.750	3.5	2.6	1.0	0.1	1.8	4.3

== Arkansas State statistics ==
Basketball statistics
Year	Team	GP	FG	FGA	FG%	3P	3PA	3P%	FT	FTA	FT%	REB	RBG	PTS	PPG
1989-90	Arkansas State	26	157	399	39.3	13	29	44.8	77	115	67.0	200	7.7	404	15.5
1990-91	Arkansas State	28	192	433	44.3	37	144	25.7	80	141	56.7	233	8.3	501	17.9
1991-92	Arkansas State	32	214	479	**44.7**	38	94	**40.4**	121	181	**66.9**	246	7.7	587	18.3
1992-93	Arkansas State	**33**	**282**	**670**	42.1	**95**	**263**	36.1	**161**	**257**	62.6	**327**	**9.9**	**820**	**24.8**
TOTALS		119	845	1981	42.7	183	530	34.5	439	694	63.3	1,006	8.5	2,312	19.4
