= La'Keshia Frett =

American basketball player (born 1975)

Personal information
- Born: June 12, 1975 (age 51) Carmel, California, U.S.
- Listed height: 6 ft 3 in (1.91 m)
- Listed weight: 170 lb (77 kg)

Career information
- High school: Phoebus (Hampton, Virginia)
- College: Georgia (1993–1997)
- WNBA draft: 1999: 4th round, 40th overall pick
- Drafted by: Los Angeles Sparks
- Playing career: 1999–2005
- Position: Power forward
- Coaching career: 2005–present

Career history

Playing
- 1999–2000: Los Angeles Sparks
- 2001–2003: Sacramento Monarchs
- 2004: Charlotte Sting
- 2004–2005: New York Liberty

Coaching
- 2005–2011: Georgia (assistant)
- 2011–2013: Georgia (DBO)
- 2013–2019: Virginia (assistant)
- 2019–2021: Auburn (assistant)
- 2021: Atlanta Dream (assistant)

Career highlights
- Third-team All-American – AP (1997); 3x First-team All-SEC (1995–1997); SEC Freshman of the Year (1994); SEC All-Freshman Team (1994); Naismith Prep Player of the Year (1993); Gatorade National Player of the Year (1993)
- Stats at Basketball Reference
Medals
Women's basketball
Representing the United States
Jones Cup
Gold medal – first place	1994 Taipei	Team competition
World University Games
Gold medal – first place	1995 Fukuoka	Team competition
Gold medal – first place	1997 Marsala, Sicily	Team competition

La'Keshia Frett (born June 12, 1975) is a former collegiate and professional basketball player. She was an assistant coach for the women's basketball team at Auburn University.

== High school ==
Born in Carmel, California, Frett attended Phoebus High School in Hampton, Virginia, where she was named a High School All-American by the WBCA. She participated in the WBCA High School All-America Game in 1993, scoring six points. Additionally, Frett was named the 1993 Gatorade Female Basketball Player of the Year. She was named a Parade All-American in both 1992 and 1993.

== University of Georgia ==
After being named the 1993 National Prep Player of the Year at Phoebus High School in Hampton, Virginia, Frett attended the University of Georgia and played for their women's basketball team, averaging 15.2 points and 6.9 rebounds during her collegiate career from 1993 to 1997.

She was a three-time All-Southeastern Conference (SEC) first team selection, and was named the 1993-94 "SEC Freshman of the Year". In 1996, Frett was named to the Final Four All Tournament team.

By the time she graduated, she had scored 242 points in 15 NCAA tournament games, ranking third time all-time at UGA. She competed with USA Basketball as a member of the 1994 Jones Cup Team that won the Gold in Taipei.

== Career statistics ==
Legend
GP	Games played	GS	Games started	MPG	Minutes per game	RPG	Rebounds per game
APG	Assists per game	SPG	Steals per game	BPG	Blocks per game	PPG	Points per game
TO	Turnovers per game	FG%	Field-goal percentage	3P%	3-point field-goal percentage	FT%	Free-throw percentage
**Bold**	Career best	°	League leader

=== WNBA ===
==== Regular season ====
Year	Team	GP	GS	MPG	FG%	3P%	FT%	RPG	APG	SPG	BPG	TO	PPG
1999	Los Angeles	31	**18**	**21.2**	47.8	0.0	79.1	**3.0**	**2.1**	0.3	0.2	0.8	6.1
2000	Los Angeles	25	0	7.5	27.5	0.0	75.0	1.0	0.2	0.3	0.2	0.5	1.6
2001	Sacramento	30	10	13.4	38.9	0.0	**85.7**	1.8	0.6	0.3	0.2	1.1	4.3
2002	Sacramento	32	15	20.3	44.9	33.3	82.4	**3.0**	0.7	0.2	**0.6**	0.8	5.8
2003	Sacramento	24	4	6.3	36.2	**50.0**	50.0	1.0	0.5	0.1	0.1	**0.4**	1.5
2004	Charlotte	10	0	7.1	46.2	0.0	50.0	1.0	0.4	0.1	0.2	1.0	1.5
2004	New York	16	2	17.3	**48.2**	0.0	64.5	2.5	0.9	**0.6**	0.3	0.9	**6.4**
2005	New York	**33**	1	10.9	47.7	0.0	73.7	1.2	0.5	0.4	0.1	0.5	3.0
Career	7 years, 4 teams	201	50	13.7	43.5	33.3	75.7	1.9	0.8	0.3	0.2	0.7	4.0

==== Playoffs ====
Year	Team	GP	GS	MPG	FG%	3P%	FT%	RPG	APG	SPG	BPG	TO	PPG
1999	Los Angeles	4	**4**	**30.3**	36.7	0.0	85.7	**5.3**	**3.3**	0.5	0.5	0.8	7.0
2000	Los Angeles	3	0	2.3	**66.7**	0.0	75.0	0.0	0.0	0.0	0.0	**0.0**	2.3
2001	Sacramento	**5**	0	3.6	12.5	0.0	**100.0**	0.4	0.2	0.0	0.0	0.2	0.8
2003	Sacramento	1	0	9.0	50.0	0.0	0.0	0.0	0.0	0.0	0.0	1.0	2.0
2004	New York	5	0	23.2	41.7	0.0	**100.0**	3.4	1.2	**0.8**	**0.6**	1.4	**8.8**
2005	New York	2	1	23.5	41.7	0.0	83.3	2.0	0.5	0.0	0.0	1.0	7.5
Career	6 years, 3 teams	20	5	15.9	38.8	0.0	87.0	2.2	1.1	0.3	0.3	0.7	5.0

=== College ===
Legend
GP	Games played	GS	Games started	MPG	Minutes per game
FG%	Field goal percentage	3P%	3-point field goal percentage	FT%	Free throw percentage
RPG	Rebounds per game	APG	Assists per game	SPG	Steals per game
BPG	Blocks per game	PPG	Points per game	**Bold**	Career high

Year	Team	GP	Points	FG%	FT%	RPG	APG	SPG	BPG	PPG
94	Georgia	28	393	47.7%	76.6%	6.0	2.5	1.2	0.5	14.0
95	Georgia	**33**	**523**	48.2%	74.8%	6.0	**3.0**	1.4	0.7	15.8
96	Georgia	**33**	481	**52.1%**	**84.1%**	**8.7**	2.0	**1.9**	**1.0**	14.6
97	Georgia	28	453	48.2%	77.8%	6.7	2.9	1.7	0.6	**16.2**
Career	Georgia	122	1850	49.1%	79.0%	6.9	2.6	1.5	0.7	15.2

== USA Basketball ==
Frett was named to the team representing the US at the 1994 William Jones Cup competition in Taipei, Taiwan. The USA team won all eight games, winning the gold medal, but not without close calls. In three games the teams had to come from behind to win. One preliminary game ended up as a single-point victory, and the gold medal game went to overtime before the USA team beat South Korea by a single point, 90–89.

Frett represented the US at the 1995 World University Games held in Fukuoka, Japan in August and September 1995. The team had a record of 5–1, securing the silver medal. The USA teams won early and reached a record of 5–0 when the USA beat Yugoslavia. In the semi-final game, the USA faced Russia. The team was behind much of the first half but managed to tie the game at the half. The USA broke the game open in the second half and won 101–74, with Frett contributing a double-double, 20 points and 13 rebounds. The gold medal match was against unbeaten Italy. The Italian team started strong, scoring 12 of the first 14 points of the contest. The USA took a small lead in the second half, but the team from Italy responded with a ten-point run, and won the game and the gold medal by a score of 73–65. Frett was the leading scorer for the USA team with 18.0 points per game.

Frett again represented the US at the 1997 World University Games held in Marsala, Sicily, Italy in August 1997. The USA team won all six games, earning the gold medal at the event. In the opening game Frett was the leading scorer for the US with 14 points. She went on to average 10.2 points per game.

== ABL and WNBA ==
After graduating from college, Frett started her professional career in 1997 playing two seasons for the Philadelphia Rage of the American Basketball League (ABL).

After the ABL folded due to financial difficulties, she was selected by the Los Angeles Sparks in the 1999 WNBA draft, and later played for the Sparks during the 1999 and 2000 seasons.

After the 2000 season ended, the Sparks traded Frett to the Sacramento Monarchs in exchange for Latasha Byears. Frett played for the Monarchs for the next three seasons before signing a free agent contract with the Charlotte Sting. However, the Sting waived her halfway through the 2004 season.

A week after being waived, she signed with the New York Liberty and played for them during the remainder of the season, as well as the following 2005 season.

Shortly after the 2005 WNBA season ended, Frett returned to her alma mater, the University of Georgia, after being hired as an assistant coach for the women's basketball team for the 2005–06 season. In April 2006, Frett announced her retirement from the WNBA to devote herself full-time to her collegiate coaching position.

In 2021, she became an assistant coach with the Atlanta Dream.
