= List of Serbian WNBA players =

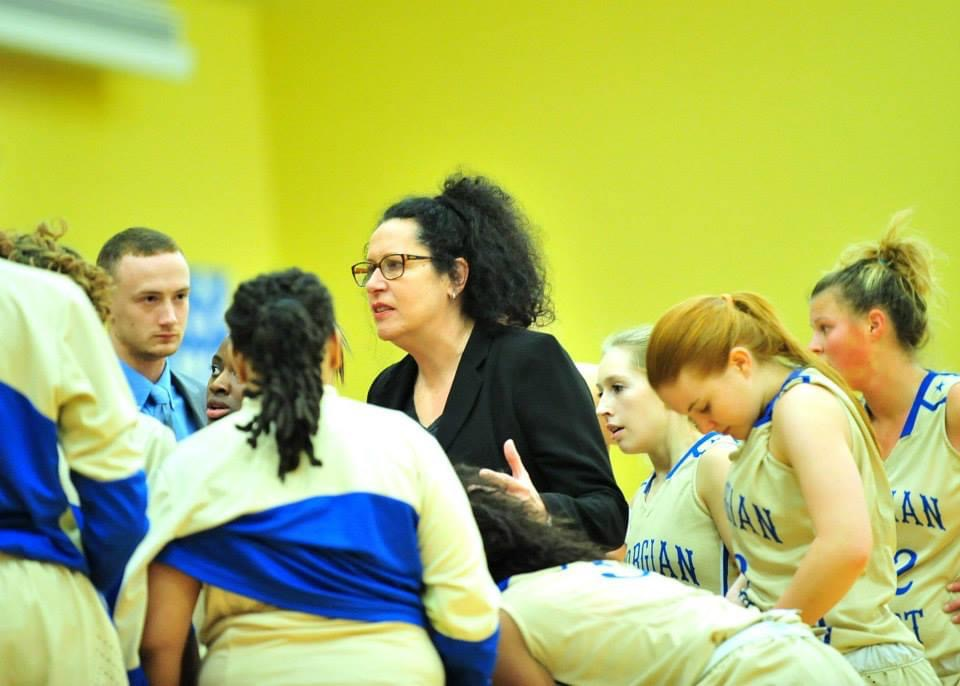
Jasmina Perazić-Gipe is the first player from Serbia to be elected to the Women's Basketball Hall of Fame.

The following is a list of Serbian basketball players that play or have played in the Women's National Basketball Association (WNBA).

== Active players ==
The following is a list of current WNBA players.

Note: This list is correct at the start of the 2026 season.

Pos.	Player	Draft Year (Pick)	Current team	Former team (Season)	Se.	SGP	PGP	Honours (Note: This section doesn't include overseas honours, WNBA finals entry and various types of records)	Ref.
C	Nikolina Milić (Note: Born in SR Bosnia and Herzegovina, Yugoslavia)	Undrafted	Toronto Tempo (2026–present)	Minnesota Lynx (2022–2023)	2	67	3	—	
F	Angela Dugalić (Note: Born in the United States, she represents Serbia, the homeland of her parents.)	2026 (#9)	Washington Mystics (2026–present)	—	0	0	0	—	
F	Jovana Nogić	Undrafted	Phoenix Mercury (2026–present)	—	0	0	0	—	

== Former players ==
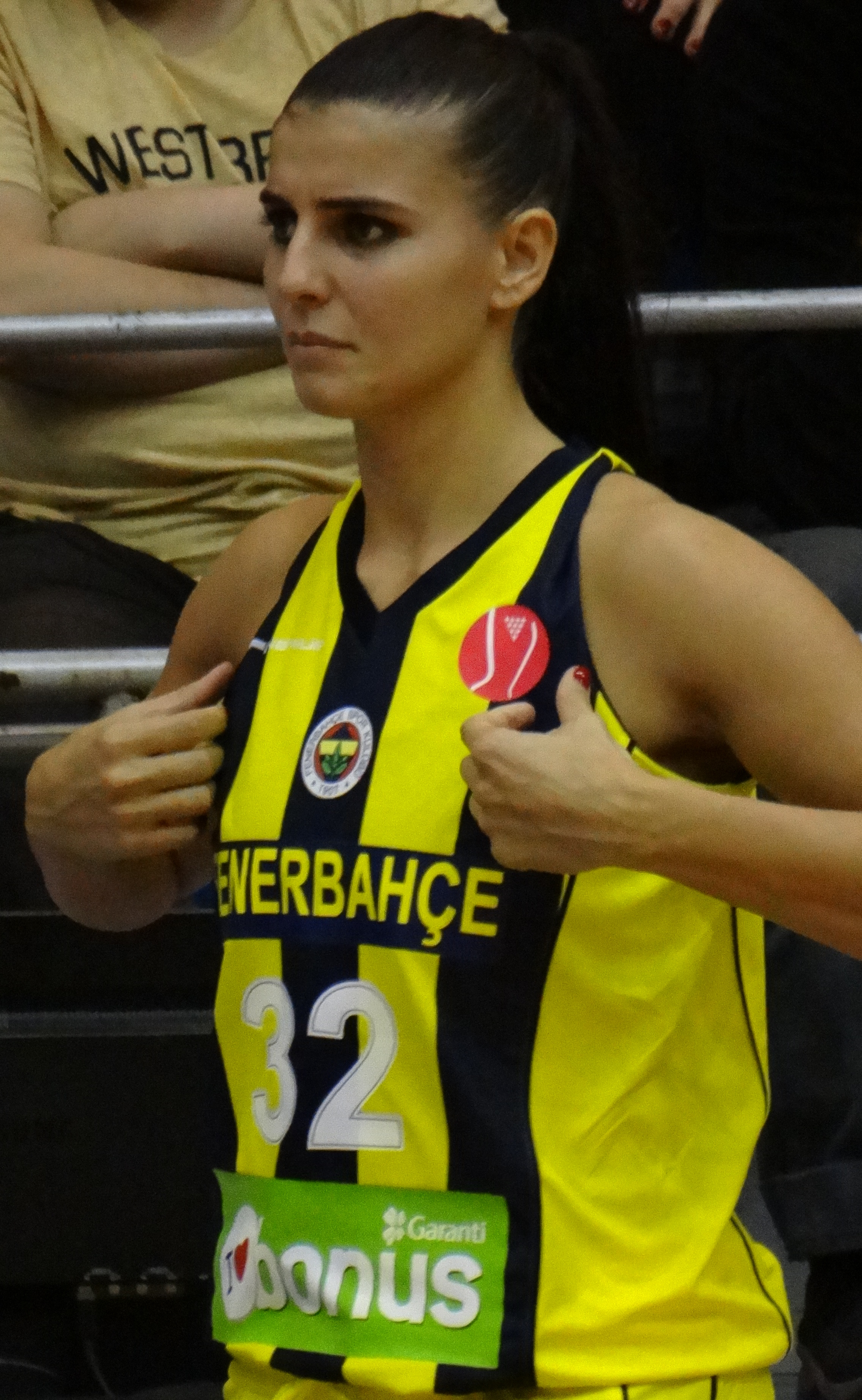
Guard Ana Dabović is the only WNBA champion from Serbia.

The following is a list of former WNBA players.

Denotes player who has been elected to the Women's Basketball Hall of Fame
Denotes player who is still active outside WNBA

Pos.	Player	Draft Year (Pick)	Former team (Season)	Se.	SGP	PGP	Honours	Ref.
G	Milica Vukadinović	Undrafted	Charlotte Sting (1997)	1	1	0	—	
F	Jasmina Perazić-Gipe	Undrafted	New York Liberty (1997)	1	9	0	—	
G	Gordana Grubin	Undrafted	4 teams: Los Angeles Sparks (1999), (2005); Indiana Fever (2000–2001); Phoenix Mercury (2002); Houston Comets (2004)	6	134	4	—	
C	Nina Bjedov	Undrafted	Los Angeles Sparks (1999)	1	27	4	—	
F	Mila Nikolić	Undrafted	Houston Comets (1999)	1	7	2	—	
C	Slobodanka Tuvić	Undrafted	Phoenix Mercury (2001–2004)	4	106	0	—	
G	Katarina Lazić	Undrafted	New York Liberty (2001)	1	8	2	—	
C	Daliborka Vilipić	Undrafted	Los Angeles Sparks (2006)	1	2	0	—	
F	Danielle Page (Note: Born in the United States, became a naturalized Serbian citizen and represented Serbia internationally) (Note: Not fluent in the Serbian language)	Undrafted	Connecticut Sun (2008)	1	3	0	—	
F	Sonja Vasić	2009 (#26)	2 teams: Chicago Sky (2012); Phoenix Mercury (2016)	2	61	2	—	
F	Jelena Brooks	2009 (#24)	Washington Mystics (2014)	1	16	0	—	
G	Ana Dabović (Note: Born in SR Montenegro, Yugoslavia)	Undrafted	Los Angeles Sparks (2015–2016)	2	46	9	2 honours: WNBA champion (2016); All-Rookie Team (2015)	
F	Tina Krajišnik	Undrafted	Chicago Sky (2022)	1	2	0	—	
G	Yvonne Anderson	Undrafted	2 teams: Connecticut Sun (2022); Minnesota Lynx (2025)	2	12	0	—	

== Drafted players ==
The following is a list of drafted players who have never appeared in an WNBA regular season or playoff game.

Draft Year (Pick)	Player	Drafted by	Status	Ref.
2010 (#34)	Tijana Krivačević (Note: Although she was born in Serbia and has Serbian citizenship, she decided to represent Hungary internationally)	Seattle Storm	Currently playing for Olympiacos, Greece	
2011 (#35)	Sara Krnjić	Washington Mystics	Currently playing for Gernika, Spain	
2015 (#30)	Dragana Stanković	San Antonio Stars	Currently playing for Lublin, Poland	
2021 (#28)	Ivana Raca (Note: Born in Cyprus)	Los Angeles Sparks	Currently playing for Athinaikos, Greece	

== Players with Serbian citizenship or parentage ==
The following is a list of players, that play or have played in the WNBA, who have citizenship of Serbia or Serbian parentage or who are Serbs of former Yugoslav republics (Bosnia and Herzegovina, Croatia, Montenegro, North Macedonia, Slovenia).

Nationality	Relation	Pos.	Player	Draft Year (Pick)	Former team (Season)	Se.	SGP	PGP	Honours	Ref.
Sweden	Serbian parents	F	Tanja Kostić	1998 (#26)	2 teams: Cleveland Rockers (1998); Miami Sol (2000)	2	10	0	—	

== See also ==
- List of foreign WNBA players
- List of Serbian NBA players
- List of Serbian NBA coaches

== Notes ==
Details

Other nationalities, ethnic groups, native-language
