= 1999 Los Angeles Sparks season =

- Head coach: Orlando Woolridge
- Arena: Great Western Forum

Results
- Record: 20–12 (.625)
- Place: 2nd (Western)
- Playoff finish: Lost Conference Finals (2-1) to Houston Comets

The 1999 WNBA season was the third for the Los Angeles Sparks. The Sparks qualified for the playoffs for the first time in franchise history, but they fell in the Conference Finals to eventual champion Houston Comets.

== Transactions ==
=== Minnesota Lynx expansion draft ===
The following player was selected in the Minnesota Lynx expansion draft from the Los Angeles Sparks:

Player	Nationality	School/Team/Country
Octavia Blue	United States	Miami (FL)

=== WNBA draft ===
Round	Pick	Player	Nationality	School/Team/Country
1	4	DeLisha Milton-Jones	United States	Portland Power
2	16	Clarisse Machanguana	Mozambique	San Jose Lasers
3	28	Ukari Figgs	United States	Purdue
4	40	La'Keshia Frett	United States	Philadelphia Rage

=== Transactions ===
Date	Transaction
April 6, 1999	Lost Octavia Blue to the Minnesota Lynx in the WNBA expansion draft
May 4, 1999	Drafted DeLisha Milton-Jones, Clarisse Machanguana, Ukari Figgs and La'Keshia Frett in the 1999 WNBA draft
May 6, 1999	Waived Michelle Reed
May 15, 1999	Signed Gordana Grubin and Nina Bjedov
June 21, 1999	Traded Jamila Wideman to the Cleveland Rockers in exchange for Jennifer Howard
June 22, 1999	Waived Sandra Van Embricqs

== Roster ==
1999 Los Angeles Sparks roster
Players
Coaches

Pos.	No.	Nat.	Name	Height	Weight	DOB	From	Yrs
C	45	(Socialist Federal Republic of Yugoslavia)	Bjedov, Nina	6' 4" (1.93m)	190 lb (86kg)	1972-05-18		R
G	21	(United States)	Dixon, Tamecka	5' 9" (1.75m)	148 lb (67kg)	1975-12-14	Kansas	2
F	5	(United States)	Feaster, Allison	5' 11" (1.8m)	168 lb (76kg)	1976-02-11	Harvard	1
G	15	(United States)	Figgs, Ukari	5' 9" (1.75m)	142 lb (64kg)	1977-03-31	Purdue	R
F	0	(United States)	Frett, La'Keshia	6' 3" (1.91m)	170 lb (77kg)	1975-06-12	Georgia	R
G	6	(Socialist Federal Republic of Yugoslavia)	Grubin, Gordana	5' 11" (1.8m)	165 lb (75kg)	1972-08-20		R
C	9	(United States)	Leslie, Lisa	6' 5" (1.96m)	170 lb (77kg)	1972-07-07	USC	2
G	4	(Zaire)	Mabika, Mwadi	5' 11" (1.8m)	165 lb (75kg)	1976-07-27		2
F/C	33	(People's Republic of Mozambique)	Machanguana, Clarisse	6' 5" (1.96m)	180 lb (82kg)	1976-10-04	Old Dominion	R
F	8	(United States)	Milton-Jones, DeLisha	6' 1" (1.85m)	175 lb (79kg)	1974-09-11	Florida	R
G	11	(United States)	Toler, Penny	5' 8" (1.73m)	132 lb (60kg)	1966-03-24	Long Beach State	2

Head coach
(United States) Orlando Woolridge (Notre Dame)

Legend

- (C) Team captain
- (DP) Unsigned draft pick
- (FA) Free agent
- (S) Suspended
- Injured

== Schedule ==
=== Regular season ===
1999 game log
Total: 20–12 (Home: 8–8; Road: 4–10)
June: 5–4 (Home: 2–1; Road: 3–3)

Game	Date	Team	Score	High points	High rebounds	High assists	Location Attendance	Record
1	June 10	Sacramento	W 100–78	Lisa Leslie (19)	Mwadi Mabika (6)	Tamecka Dixon (5)	Great Western Forum	1–0
2	June 12	@ Cleveland	W 75–59	Lisa Leslie (30)	Lisa Leslie (18)	Figgs; Grubin (4)	Gund Arena	2–0
3	June 15	@ Orlando	L 86–88	Lisa Leslie (23)	Lisa Leslie (9)	Mwadi Mabika (5)	TD Waterhouse Centre	2–1
4	June 18	@ New York	L 72–84	Ukari Figgs (13)	Lisa Leslie (10)	Mwadi Mabika (4)	Madison Square Garden	2–2
5	June 19	@ Charlotte	W 73–69	Lisa Leslie (15)	Leslie; Mabika (7)	Mwadi Mabika (6)	Charlotte Coliseum	3–2
6	June 22	@ Houston	L 76–84	Lisa Leslie (19)	DeLisha Milton-Jones (12)	Dixon; Frett; Figgs; Grubin; Mabika (2)	Compaq Center	3–3
7	June 24	Minnesota	L 73–86	Lisa Leslie (21)	Lisa Leslie (7)	Ukari Figgs (4)	Great Western Forum	3–4
8	June 26	@ Sacramento	W 76–73	DeLisha Milton-Jones (20)	DeLisha Milton-Jones (9)	Dixon; Milton-Jones (4)	ARCO Arena	4–4
9	June 28	Utah	W 102–70	Penny Toler (21)	Lisa Leslie (7)	Mwadi Mabika (7)	Great Western Forum	5–4

July: 11–2 (Home: 8–1; Road: 3–1)

Game	Date	Team	Score	High points	High rebounds	High assists	Location Attendance	Record
10	July 1	@ Minnesota	W 81–77 (2OT)	Gordana Grubin (20)	DeLisha Milton-Jones (9)	Grubin; Mabika (5)	Target Center	6–4
11	July 2	@ Detroit	W 91–81	Lisa Leslie (18)	Lisa Leslie (10)	Penny Toler (7)	The Palace of Auburn Hills	7–4
12	July 5	Cleveland	W 74–72	Nina Bjedov (14)	Lisa Leslie (11)	Frett; Leslie; Toler (5)	Great Western Forum	8–4
13	July 7	@ Phoenix	W 67–61	Mwadi Mabika (16)	Lisa Leslie (8)	Penny Toler (4)	America West Arena	9–4
14	July 9	Sacramento	L 72–77	Leslie; Mabika (16)	Lisa Leslie (9)	Feaster; Toler (3)	Great Western Forum	9–5
15	July 11	Phoenix	W 68–57	DeLisha Milton-Jones (14)	DeLisha Milton-Jones (8)	La'Keshia Frett (5)	Great Western Forum	10–5
16	July 17	@ Phoenix	L 76–84	Lisa Leslie (21)	Lisa Leslie (8)	Mwadi Mabika (7)	America West Arena	10–6
17	July 18	Houston	W 78–65	Lisa Leslie (20)	Lisa Leslie (12)	Gordana Grubin (6)	Great Western Forum	11–6
18	July 21	Phoenix	W 84–63	Lisa Leslie (18)	Nina Bjedov (8)	Tamecka Dixon (6)	Great Western Forum	12–6
19	July 24	New York	W 75–72 (OT)	Lisa Leslie (22)	Mwadi Mabika (11)	Grubin; Leslie (4)	Great Western Forum	13–6
20	July 27	Orlando	W 81–60	Lisa Leslie (19)	Leslie; Milton-Jones (10)	Lisa Leslie (5)	Great Western Forum	14–6
21	July 30	Utah	W 87–77	Lisa Leslie (24)	Leslie; Mabika (10)	Mwadi Mabika (7)	Great Western Forum	15–6
22	July 31	Washington	W 81–64	Lisa Leslie (15)	Mwadi Mabika (11)	Mwadi Mabika (5)	Great Western Forum	16–6

August: 4–6 (Home: 3–1; Road: 1–5)

Game	Date	Team	Score	High points	High rebounds	High assists	Location Attendance	Record
23	August 3	@ Utah	L 75–81	Gordana Grubin (20)	Lisa Leslie (8)	Gordana Grubin (5)	Delta Center	16–7
24	August 6	@ Minnesota	W 77–59	Lisa Leslie (29)	Lisa Leslie (15)	La'Keshia Frett (8)	Target Center	17–7
25	August 9	Detroit	L 59–84	DeLisha Milton-Jones (16)	DeLisha Milton-Jones (8)	Figgs; Mabika (3)	Great Western Forum	17–8
26	August 10	@ Sacramento	L 80–82	Mwadi Mabika (20)	Leslie; Milton-Jones (8)	Gordana Grubin (6)	ARCO Arena	17–9
27	August 12	@ Houston	L 61–83	Gordana Grubin (10)	Lisa Leslie (8)	Figgs; La'Keshia Frett (6)	Compaq Center	17–10
28	August 14	@ Washington	L 53–55	DeLisha Milton-Jones (13)	Leslie; Mabika (6)	Frett; Grubin; Mabika; Toler (3)	MCI Center	17–11
29	August 16	Charlotte	W 76–65	Lisa Leslie (25)	La'Keshia Frett (10)	La'Keshia Frett (6)	Great Western Forum	18–11
30	August 18	Minnesota	W 72–54	Allison Feaster (16)	DeLisha Milton-Jones (9)	Mabika; Toler (3)	Great Western Forum	19–11
31	August 20	Houston	W 68–64	DeLisha Milton-Jones (18)	DeLisha Milton-Jones (7)	Gordana Grubin (6)	Great Western Forum	20–11
32	August 21	@ Utah	L 81–89	Allison Feaster (14)	Mwadi Mabika (4)	Mwadi Mabika (7)	Delta Center	20–12

1999 season schedule

=== Playoffs ===
1999 playoff game log
First round vs. Sacramento Monarchs
Won Series: 1–0

Game	Date	Team	Score	High points	High rebounds	High assists	Location Attendance	Series
1	August 24	Sacramento	W 71–58	Lisa Leslie (22)	Lisa Leslie (12)	Gordana Grubin (9)	Great Western Forum	1–0

Conference Finals vs. Houston Comets
Lost Series: 1–2

Game	Date	Team	Score	High points	High rebounds	High assists	Location Attendance	Series
1	August 26	Houston	W 75–60	Lisa Leslie (23)	Frett; Leslie (7)	Gordana Grubin (7)	Great Western Forum	1–0
2	August 29	@ Houston	L 55–83	Lisa Leslie (11)	Lisa Leslie (8)	Lisa Leslie (4)	Compaq Center	1–1
3	August 30	@ Houston	L 62–72	Lisa Leslie (20)	Leslie; Mabika (7)	Mwadi Mabika (5)	Compaq Center	1–2

1999 playoff schedule

=== Season standings ===
Western Conference	W	L	PCT	Conf.	GB
Houston Comets ^{x}	26	6	.813	16–4	–
Los Angeles Sparks ^{x}	20	12	.625	12–8	6.0
Sacramento Monarchs ^{x}	19	13	.594	9–11	7.0
Phoenix Mercury ^{o}	15	17	.469	7–13	11.0
Minnesota Lynx ^{o}	15	17	.469	8–12	11.0
Utah Starzz ^{o}	15	17	.469	8–12	11.0

== Statistics ==
Legend
GP	Games played	GS	Games started	MPG	Minutes per game	RPG	Rebounds per game
APG	Assists per game	SPG	Steals per game	BPG	Blocks per game	PPG	Points per game
FG%	Field-goal percentage	3P%	3-point field-goal percentage	FT%	Free-throw percentage	TO	Turnovers per game
PF	Fouls per game		Team leader		League leader

=== Regular season ===
Player	GP	GS	MPG	FG%	3P%	FT%	RPG	APG	SPG	BPG	PPG
Mwadi Mabika	32	28	29.3	.372	.281	.718	4.8	3.5	1.4	0.5	10.8
Lisa Leslie	32	32	29.1	.467	.423	.731	7.8	1.8	1.1	1.5	15.6
DeLisha Milton-Jones	32	32	26.1	.530	.000	.791	5.5	1.6	1.5	0.5	9.9
Gordana Grubin	32	18	22.1	.405	.430	.765	2.2	2.8	0.8	0.1	8.9
La'Keshia Frett	31	18	21.2	.478	N/A	.791	3.0	2.1	0.3	0.2	6.1
Tamecka Dixon	32	14	17.6	.378	.313	.738	2.1	1.7	0.5	0.1	6.8
Nina Bjedov	27	0	16.0	.520	.421	.500	2.6	0.6	0.3	0.8	4.5
Ukari Figgs	22	10	15.0	.366	.298	.875	1.6	1.5	0.7	0.0	4.3
Penny Toler	30	4	14.2	.340	.154	.867	1.4	2.2	0.4	0.0	4.8
Allison Feaster	32	4	12.8	.495	.368	.684	1.8	1.0	0.5	0.2	5.1
Clarisse Machanguana	28	0	8.8	.490	N/A	.722	1.8	0.4	0.3	0.1	2.6

^{‡}Waived/Released during the season
^{†}Traded during the season
^{≠}Acquired during the season
