= 1999 Detroit Shock season =

- Head coach: Nancy Lieberman-Cline
- Arena: The Palace of Auburn Hills

Results
- Record: 15–17 (.469)
- Place: 2nd (Eastern)
- Playoff finish: Lost First Round (1-0) to Charlotte Sting

The 1999 WNBA season was the second for the Detroit Shock. The Shock entered the playoffs for the first time in franchise history.

== Transactions ==
=== WNBA draft ===
Round	Pick	Player	Nationality	School/Team/Country
1	5	Jennifer Azzi	United States	San Jose Lasers
2	17	Val Whiting-Raymond	United States	Seattle Reign
3	29	Dominique Canty	United States	Alabama
4	41	Astou Ndiaye-Diatta	Senegal	Seattle Reign

=== Transactions ===
Date	Transaction
May 4, 1999	Drafted Jennifer Azzi, Val Whiting-Raymond, Dominique Canty and Astou Ndiaye-Diatta in the 1999 WNBA draft
May 6, 1999	Signed Claudia Neves, Oksana Zakaluzhnaya and Laura Baker
May 7, 1999	Waived Aneta Kausaite and Lynette Woodard
May 31, 1999	Waived Laura Baker
June 9, 1999	Waived Gergana Branzova
July 5, 1999	Waived Elena Tornikidou
July 28, 1999	Signed Wanda Guyton
July 30, 1999	Traded Cindy Brown and Korie Hlede to the Utah Starzz in exchange for Wendy Palmer and Olympia Scott-Richardson

== Roster ==
1999 Detroit Shock roster
Players
Coaches

Pos.	No.	Nat.	Name	Height	Weight	DOB	From	Yrs
G	8	(United States)	Azzi, Jennifer	5' 8" (1.73m)	143 lb (65kg)	1968-08-31	Stanford	R
F	11	(Australia)	Boyd, Carla	6' 1" (1.85m)	172 lb (78kg)	1975-10-31		1
G	6	(Australia)	Brondello, Sandy	5' 7" (1.7m)	136 lb (62kg)	1968-08-20		1
F	14	(United States)	Brown, Cindy	6' 2" (1.88m)	183 lb (83kg)	1965-03-16	Long Beach State	1
G		(United States)	Brown, Lesley	6' 0" (1.83m)	165 lb (75kg)	1977-06-03	Virginia	R
G	10	(United States)	Canty, Dominique	5' 9" (1.75m)	166 lb (75kg)	1977-03-02	Alabama	R
C	4	(United States)	Guyton, Wanda	6' 1" (1.85m)	178 lb (81kg)	1968-10-14	South Florida	2
G	7	(Socialist Federal Republic of Yugoslavia)	Hlede, Korie	5' 9" (1.75m)	155 lb (70kg)	1975-03-29	Duquesne	1
F	44	(Senegal)	Ndiaye-Diatta, Astou	6' 3" (1.91m)	182 lb (83kg)	1973-11-05	Southern Nazarene	R
F	9	(Brazil)	Neves, Claudia	5' 8" (1.73m)	136 lb (62kg)	1975-02-17		R
F	3	(United States)	Palmer, Wendy	6' 2" (1.88m)	165 lb (75kg)	1974-08-12	Virginia	2
C	0	(United States)	Scott-Richardson, Olympia	6' 2" (1.88m)	175 lb (79kg)	1976-05-05	Stanford	1
F	4	(Australia)	Sporn, Rachael	6' 1" (1.85m)	175 lb (79kg)	1968-03-26		1
F	17	(Soviet Union)	Tornikidou, Elena	6' 1" (1.85m)	160 lb (73kg)	1965-05-27		R
F/C	52	(United States)	Whiting-Raymond, Val	6' 2" (1.88m)	199 lb (90kg)	1972-04-09	Stanford	R

Head coach
(United States) Nancy Lieberman-Cline (Old Dominion)
Assistant coaches
(United States) Laura Ramus

Legend

- (C) Team captain
- (DP) Unsigned draft pick
- (FA) Free agent
- (S) Suspended
- Injured

== Schedule ==
=== Regular season ===
1999 game log
Total: 15–17 (Home: 7–9; Road: 8–8)
June: 5–4 (Home: 3–2; Road: 2–2)

Game	Date	Team	Score	High points	High rebounds	High assists	Location Attendance	Record
1	June 12	@ Minnesota	L 51–68	Sandy Brondello (15)	Val Whiting-Raymond (16)	Azzi; Brondello (3)	Target Center	0–1
2	June 14	@ Cleveland	W 73–71	Brondello; Hlede (15)	Val Whiting-Raymond (7)	Val Whiting-Raymond (4)	Gund Arena	1–1
3	June 17	Orlando	W 79–74	Sandy Brondello (23)	Astou Ndiaye-Diatta (8)	Sandy Brondello (7)	The Palace of Auburn Hills	2–1
4	June 18	@ Washington	W 76–69	Jennifer Azzi (18)	Val Whiting-Raymond (7)	Val Whiting-Raymond (5)	MCI Center	3–1
5	June 20	@ New York	L 62–69	Sandy Brondello (16)	Cindy Brown (10)	Jennifer Azzi (6)	Madison Square Garden	3–2
6	June 22	Charlotte	W 75–69	Sandy Brondello (19)	Astou Ndiaye-Diatta (9)	Azzi; Hlede (3)	The Palace of Auburn Hills	4–2
7	June 24	Houston	L 65–77	Korie Hlede (17)	Brown; Ndiaye-Diatta (6)	Sandy Brondello (2)	The Palace of Auburn Hills	4–3
8	June 26	Phoenix	L 60–66	Dominique Canty (16)	Cindy Brown (6)	Sandy Brondello (3)	The Palace of Auburn Hills	4–4
9	June 28	New York	W 91–71	Korie Hlede (17)	Brown; Canty (6)	Sandy Brondello (5)	The Palace of Auburn Hills	5–4

July: 5–8 (Home: 2–5; Road: 3–3)

Game	Date	Team	Score	High points	High rebounds	High assists	Location Attendance	Record
10	July 2	Los Angeles	L 81–91	Sandy Brondello (21)	Cindy Brown (10)	Brondello; Sporn (3)	The Palace of Auburn Hills	5–5
11	July 4	Sacramento	L 78–92	Cindy Brown (18)	Val Whiting-Raymond (10)	Brown; Hlede (4)	The Palace of Auburn Hills	5–6
12	July 6	@ Utah	L 94–104 (2OT)	Sandy Brondello (33)	Cindy Brown (10)	Jennifer Azzi (5)	Delta Center	5–7
13	July 10	Washington	L 78–83 (2OT)	Brondello; Canty (15)	Val Whiting-Raymond (13)	Azzi; Brondello (4)	The Palace of Auburn Hills	5–8
14	July 12	@ Orlando	W 76–67	Sandy Brondello (22)	Val Whiting-Raymond (15)	Jennifer Azzi (7)	TD Waterhouse Centre	6–8
15	July 16	@ Washington	W 78–68	Sandy Brondello (18)	Sporn; Whiting-Raymond (7)	Jennifer Azzi (6)	MCI Center	7–8
16	July 17	Cleveland	W 77–61	Cindy Brown (14)	Cindy Brown (8)	Jennifer Azzi (8)	The Palace of Auburn Hills	8–8
17	July 21	Utah	W 86–77	Cindy Brown (18)	Val Whiting-Raymond (9)	Jennifer Azzi (6)	The Palace of Auburn Hills	9–8
18	July 23	@ Cleveland	W 69–60	Jennifer Azzi (20)	Cindy Brown (8)	Jennifer Azzi (8)	Gund Arena	10–8
19	July 25	Charlotte	L 66–78	Korie Hlede (22)	Carla Boyd (7)	Sandy Brondello (5)	The Palace of Auburn Hills	10–9
20	July 27	@ Houston	L 46–85	Jennifer Azzi (10)	Cindy Brown (9)	Azzi; Brondello (2)	Compaq Center	10–10
21	July 28	@ Charlotte	L 65–84	Sandy Brondello (15)	Val Whiting-Raymond (5)	Val Whiting-Raymond (5)	Charlotte Coliseum	10–11
22	July 31	Cleveland	L 53–55	Val Whiting-Raymond (9)	Astou Ndiaye-Diatta (11)	Val Whiting-Raymond (4)	The Palace of Auburn Hills	10–12

August: 5–5 (Home: 2–2; Road: 3–3)

Game	Date	Team	Score	High points	High rebounds	High assists	Location Attendance	Record
23	August 2	Washington	L 70–75	Jennifer Azzi (22)	Val Whiting-Raymond (10)	Jennifer Azzi (4)	The Palace of Auburn Hills	10–13
24	August 4	Minnesota	W 59–56	Sandy Brondello (21)	Val Whiting-Raymond (13)	Dominique Canty (3)	The Palace of Auburn Hills	11–13
25	August 6	@ Sacramento	L 58–71	Sandy Brondello (13)	Val Whiting-Raymond (12)	Jennifer Azzi (3)	ARCO Arena	11–14
26	August 9	@ Los Angeles	W 84–59	Dominique Canty (18)	Wendy Palmer (12)	Azzi; Brondello (3)	Great Western Forum	12–14
27	August 11	@ Phoenix	L 57–68	Carla Boyd (14)	Wendy Palmer (12)	Val Whiting-Raymond (4)	America West Arena	12–15
28	August 13	New York	L 56–60	Sandy Brondello (15)	Wendy Palmer (11)	Dominique Canty (2)	The Palace of Auburn Hills	12–16
29	August 15	@ New York	W 63–57	Wendy Palmer (27)	Wendy Palmer (14)	Jennifer Azzi (5)	Madison Square Garden	13–16
30	August 18	@ Orlando	L 81–93	Jennifer Azzi (19)	Wendy Palmer (13)	Jennifer Azzi (5)	TD Waterhouse Centre	13–17
31	August 20	@ Charlotte	W 58–57	Wendy Palmer (20)	Wendy Palmer (9)	Azzi; Boyd (4)	Charlotte Coliseum	14–17
32	August 18	Orlando	W 74–68	Jennifer Azzi (27)	Wendy Palmer (14)	Azzi Boyd; Canty (2)	The Palace of Auburn Hills	15–17

1999 season schedule

=== Playoffs ===
1999 playoff game log
First round vs. Charlotte Sting
Lost Series: 0–1

Game	Date	Team	Score	High points	High rebounds	High assists	Location Attendance	Record
1	August 24	Charlotte	L 54–60	Wendy Palmer (10)	Wendy Palmer (9)	Jennifer Azzi (3)	The Palace of Auburn Hills	0–1

1999 playoff schedule

=== Season standings ===
Eastern Conference	W	L	PCT	Conf.	GB
New York Liberty ^{x}	18	14	.563	12–8	–
Detroit Shock ^{x}	15	17	.469	12–8	3.0
Charlotte Sting ^{x}	15	17	.469	12–8	3.0
Orlando Miracle ^{o}	15	17	.469	9–11	3.0
Washington Mystics ^{o}	12	20	.375	10–10	6.0
Cleveland Rockers ^{o}	7	25	.219	5–15	11.0

== Statistics ==
Legend
GP	Games played	GS	Games started	MPG	Minutes per game	RPG	Rebounds per game
APG	Assists per game	SPG	Steals per game	BPG	Blocks per game	PPG	Points per game
FG%	Field-goal percentage	3P%	3-point field-goal percentage	FT%	Free-throw percentage	TO	Turnovers per game
PF	Fouls per game		Team leader		League leader

=== Regular season ===
Player	GP	GS	MPG	FG%	3P%	FT%	RPG	APG	SPG	BPG	PPG
Sandy Brondello	32	32	31.3	.438	.487	.847	2.1	2.3	0.8	0.2	13.3
Jennifer Azzi	28	19	29.9	.514	.517	.827	2.2	3.8	0.9	0.1	10.8
Wendy Palmer	11	10	26.8	.470	.250	.764	9.5	1.1	0.5	0.4	12.7
Dominique Canty	26	11	24.8	.332	.176	.691	3.1	1.5	1.0	0.0	9.6
Val Whiting-Raymond	31	20	24.6	.380	N/A	.455	6.7	1.6	1.3	1.0	6.5
Cindy Brown	21	21	23.3	.315	.233	.692	5.4	1.0	1.2	0.6	6.9
Carla Boyd	32	26	21.7	.397	.333	.630	2.3	1.6	0.8	0.3	5.4
Korie Hlede	21	10	19.4	.390	.333	.857	2.6	1.2	1.0	0.1	8.8
Rachael Sporn	18	10	18.9	.468	.000	.643	3.3	1.5	0.8	0.2	5.9
Astou Ndiaye-Diatta	31	1	14.1	.438	.000	.615	3.2	0.5	0.4	0.6	5.3
Claudia Neves	30	0	10.2	.263	.233	.632	0.8	1.0	0.5	0.0	2.5
Wanda Guyton	11	0	8.9	.235	N/A	.813	2.4	0.2	0.2	0.2	1.9
Elena Tornikidou	11	0	7.8	.391	N/A	.333	0.8	0.7	0.1	0.1	1.8
Olympia Scott-Richardson	8	0	6.5	.333	N/A	.667	1.5	0.4	0.0	0.4	2.0
Lesley Brown	13	0	3.3	.438	.500	.667	0.7	0.2	0.1	0.1	1.5

^{‡}Waived/Released during the season
^{†}Traded during the season
^{≠}Acquired during the season
