= Carla Boyd =

Australian basketball player (born 1975)

Medal record

Women's Basketball

Representing Australia

Olympic Games
| Bronze medal – third place | 1996 Atlanta | Team competition |
| Silver medal – second place | 2000 Sydney | Team competition |

World Championships
| Bronze medal – third place | 1998 Germany | Team competition |

World Junior Championship
| Gold medal – first place | 1993 Seoul | Team competition |

Carla Boyd (born 31 October 1975) is an Australian former professional basketball player in the WNBA as a forward for the Detroit Shock. She won a bronze (1996) and a silver (2000) medal with the Australian Women's Team at the Summer Olympics.

== International career ==
She played in Tarbes (France) in 2001-2002 and 2002–2003, taking part in the French League (LFB) and in the EuroLeague for Women.

== Club career ==
=== Australia ===
- 1991–1993: Australian Institute of Sport (WNBL)
- 1994–1998; 2000–2001: Adelaide Lightning (WNBL)

=== WNBA ===
- 1998–1999; 2001: Detroit Shock

=== Europe ===
- 1998–1999: GoldZack Wuppertal
- 2001–2005: Tarbes GB

== Career statistics ==
=== WNBA ===
==== Regular season ====
| Year | Team | GP | GS | MPG | FG% | 3P% | FT% | RPG | APG | SPG | BPG | TO | PPG |
|---|---|---|---|---|---|---|---|---|---|---|---|---|---|
| 1998 | Detroit | 30° | 24 | 27.2 | .342 | .302 | .632 | 3.9 | 2.3 | .9 | .3 | 1.7 | 8.2 |
| 1999 | Detroit | 32° | 26 | 21.7 | .397 | .333 | .630 | 2.3 | 1.6 | .8 | .3 | 1.7 | 5.4 |
| 2001 | Detroit | 21 | 0 | 11.0 | .343 | .306 | .900 | 1.2 | .7 | .5 | .1 | .8 | 3.6 |
| Career | 3 years, 1 team | 83 | 50 | 21.0 | .361 | .313 | .675 | 2.6 | 1.6 | .7 | .2 | 1.5 | 5.9 |

==== Playoffs ====
| Year | Team | GP | GS | MPG | FG% | 3P% | FT% | RPG | APG | SPG | BPG | TO | PPG |
|---|---|---|---|---|---|---|---|---|---|---|---|---|---|
| 1999 | Detroit | 1 | 1 | 19.0 | .400 | .333 | – | 2.0 | 2.0 | .0 | 1.0 | 2.0 | 5.0 |

== See also ==
- List of Australian WNBA players
