= Mactabene Amachree =

Nigerian basketball player

Personal information
- Born: 30 January 1978 (age 48) Port Harcourt, Nigeria
- Listed height: 6 ft 1 in (1.85 m)
- Listed weight: 179 lb (81 kg)

Career information
- College: Abilene Christian
- Playing career: 2001–present
- Position: Forward

Career history
- 2001: New York Liberty
- 2003: Seattle Storm
- 2005: Washington Mystics
- Stats at Basketball Reference
Medals
Women's basketball
Representing Nigeria
African Games (All-Africa Games)
Gold medal – first place	2003 Abuja	Team

Mactabene Amachree (born 30 January 1978) is a Nigerian former professional basketball player. In 2001, she became the first Nigerian to play in the WNBA. Amachree played on the Nigeria women's national basketball team in the 2004 Summer Olympics. She is also the princess of the Ojuka Clan of the Kalabari people in Nigeria.

== Career statistics ==
Legend
GP	Games played	GS	Games started	MPG	Minutes per game	RPG	Rebounds per game
APG	Assists per game	SPG	Steals per game	BPG	Blocks per game	PPG	Points per game
TO	Turnovers per game	FG%	Field-goal percentage	3P%	3-point field-goal percentage	FT%	Free-throw percentage
**Bold**	Career best	°	League leader

=== WNBA ===
WNBA regular season statistics
Year	Team	GP	GS	MPG	FG%	3P%	FT%	RPG	APG	SPG	BPG	TO	PPG
2001	New York	2	0	1.5	—	—	.500	0.5	0.0	0.0	**0.5**	0.5	0.5
2002	Did not play (waived)												
2003	Seattle	**7**	0	**6.7**	**.300**	—	.500	**2.0**	0.0	**0.7**	0.3	1.3	**1.1**
2004	Did not play (Olympics)												
2005	Washington	3	0	1.0	.000	—	**1.000**	0.0	0.0	0.0	0.0	**0.0**	0.7
**Career**	3 years, 3 teams	12	0	4.4	.273	—	.625	1.3	0.0	0.4	0.3	0.8	0.9
