= Polina Tzekova =

Bulgarian basketball player (born 1968)

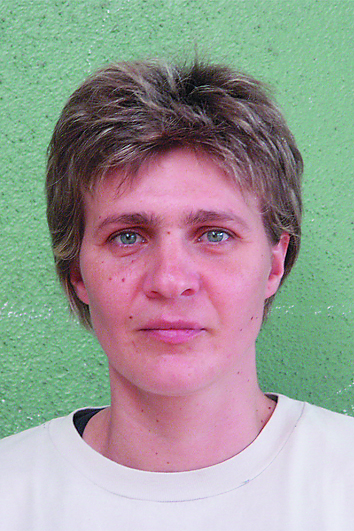
- Tzekova in 2005

Personal information
- Born: 30 April 1968 (age 58) Pleven, Bulgaria
- Listed height: 1.95 m (6 ft 5 in)

Career information
- WNBA draft: 1998: 1st round, 10th overall pick
- Drafted by: Houston Comets
- Playing career: 1987–2009
- Position: Center
- Number: 15

Career history
- 1987–1991: Lokomotiv Sofia
- 1991–1995: Priolo
- 1995–2002: Tarbes Gespe Bigorre
- 1999: Houston Comets
- 2003–2005: Tarbes Gespe Bigorre
- 2005–2008: Mourenx BC
- 2008–2009: Tarbes Gespe Bigorre

Career highlights
- 2× French League MVP (1999, 2000)
- Stats at Basketball Reference
Medals
Women's basketball
Representing Bulgaria
EuroBasket
Silver medal – second place	1985 Italy	Team competition

Polina Tzekova (family name sometimes also transliterated as Tsekova, Bulgarian Cyrillic: Полина Цекова; born 30 April 1968, in Pleven) is an international basketball player from Bulgaria, considered to be among the best female basketballers the country has ever produced. She has represented the Bulgaria women's national basketball team, averaging 18,5 points for the side. In 1999, Tzekova signed with the Houston Comets in the Women's National Basketball Association and was part of the roster that won the title at the end of the 1999 WNBA season.

She also competed in the women's tournament at the 1988 Summer Olympics.
