= Hajdana Radunović =

Montenegrin basketball player (born 1978)

Personal information
- Born: 10 January 1978 (age 48) Titograd, SFR Yugoslavia
- Listed height: 1.92 m (6 ft 4 in)
- Listed weight: 85 kg (187 lb)

Career information
- WNBA draft: 2000: undrafted
- Playing career: 19??–2015
- Position: Center

Career history
- –1994: Budućnost Podgorica
- 1996–2000: Hemofarm
- 2001: New York Liberty
- 2002–2003: Tarbes
- 2003–200?: Pau Orthez
- 200?–2008: Strasburgo BC
- 2008–2010: UNI Győr
- 2010–2011: Elitzur Ramla
- 2011: Katarzynki Toruń
- 2011–2012: Partizan
- 2013: Libertas
- 2013: Partizan
- 2014: BLK Praga
- 2014: Athinaikos
- 2015: Budućnost Podgorica
- 2015: Partizan
- Stats at Basketball Reference

Hajdana Radunović (born 10 January 1978) is a Montenegrin former basketball player. She played as a center.

== Career statistics ==
Legend
GP	Games played	GS	Games started	MPG	Minutes per game	RPG	Rebounds per game
APG	Assists per game	SPG	Steals per game	BPG	Blocks per game	PPG	Points per game
TO	Turnovers per game	FG%	Field-goal percentage	3P%	3-point field-goal percentage	FT%	Free-throw percentage
**Bold**	Career best	°	League leader

=== WNBA ===
WNBA regular season statistics
Year	Team	GP	GS	MPG	FG%	3P%	FT%	RPG	APG	SPG	BPG	TO	PPG
2001	New York	4	0	2.3	.500	—	1.000	1.0	0.0	0.0	0.3	0.5	1.0
**Career**	1 year, 1 team	4	0	2.3	.500	—	1.000	1.0	0.0	0.0	0.3	0.5	1.0
