= Gordana Grubin =

Serbian basketball player (born 1972)

Personal information
- Born: August 20, 1972 (age 54) Zrenjanin, SFR Yugoslavia
- Listed height: 1.80 m (5 ft 11 in)
- Listed weight: 75 kg (165 lb)

Career information
- Playing career: –2007
- Position: Shooting guard

Career history
- Bečej
- 1996–1997: Hemofarm
- 1997–1998: Vojvodina
- 1998–1999: MiZo Pécs
- 1999: Los Angeles Sparks
- 2000–2001: Indiana Fever
- 2000–2001: Basket Parma
- 2001–2003: Lotos Gdynia
- 2002: Phoenix Mercury
- 2003–2005: Basket Parma
- 2004: Houston Comets
- 2005: Los Angeles Sparks
- 2005–2006: PF Schio
- 2006–2007: Spartak Moscow Region
- Stats at Basketball Reference

Gordana Grubin (Serbian Cyrillic:Гордана Грубин, born August 20, 1972, in Zrenjanin, SFR Yugoslavia) is a former Serbian professional basketball player who played in Europe and the United States.

== WNBA career ==
Grubin played six seasons in WNBA for the Los Angeles Sparks, Indiana Fever, Phoenix Mercury and Houston Comets.

In the 1999 WNBA season she ranked fifth in three-point percentage. Gordana became first Indiana Fever player in their franchise history as she was selected as the first pick of the 2000 expansion draft on December 15, 1999.

== European career ==
- MVP of National championship of Yugoslavia 1997
- Winner of Hungarian Cup 1999
- Winner of European Fiba Cup 1999/2000 with Basket Parma
- Elected the best foreign player of Italian Championship 1999/2000
- Winner of Italian Cup and Italian Championship 2000/2001
- Winner of Polish Cup and Polish Championship 2001/2002 and 2002/2003
- Finalist Fiba Europe Eurolegaue 2002
- Finalist of Italian Championship 2003/2004
- The Best scorer of Euroleague 2003/2004
- Winner of Supercup with Schio 2004
- Winner of 2006 EuroCup Women with Spartak Moscow

== Awards ==
In 2002 voted from Gazzetta dello Sport 6th best basketball player of Europe.

== National team ==
Grubin played for the Serbian national team at the 1999 and 2003 Eurobasket.

== Career statistics ==
Legend
GP	Games played	GS	Games started	MPG	Minutes per game	RPG	Rebounds per game
APG	Assists per game	SPG	Steals per game	BPG	Blocks per game	PPG	Points per game
TO	Turnovers per game	FG%	Field-goal percentage	3P%	3-point field-goal percentage	FT%	Free-throw percentage
**Bold**	Career best	°	League leader

=== WNBA ===
==== Regular season ====
Year	Team	GP	GS	MPG	FG%	3P%	FT%	RPG	APG	SPG	BPG	TO	PPG
1999	Los Angeles	**32**°	18	22.1	**.405**	**.430**	.765	2.2	2.8	.8	**.1**	1.7	8.9
2000	Indiana	29	20	24.8	.377	.308	.775	**2.6**	2.2	**1.1**	.0	2.1	8.2
2001	Indiana	27	9	17.8	.371	.293	.744	1.8	1.2	.3	.0	1.3	6.3
2002	Phoenix	**32**°	**31**	**26.8**	.384	.315	.759	2.0	**3.3**	**1.1**	**.1**	1.8	**9.9**
2004	Houston	5	0	4.8	.000	–	**1.000**	.2	.0	.0	.0	.6	.4
2005	Los Angeles	9	0	4.6	.000	.000	.250	.7	.6	.1	.0	**.2**	.1
Career	5 years, 1 team	134	78	21.1	.381	.339	.754	2.0	2.2	.7	.0	1.6	7.6

==== Playoffs ====
Year	Team	GP	GS	MPG	FG%	3P%	FT%	RPG	APG	SPG	BPG	TO	PPG
1999	Los Angeles	4	4	29.8	.351	.250	.500	3.0	5.8	1.3	.0	2.0	7.8

== See also ==
- List of Serbian WNBA players
