= Begoña García (basketball) =

Spanish basketball player

Personal information
- Born: March 1, 1976 (age 50) Cadiz, Spain
- Listed height: 165 cm (5 ft 5 in)
- Position: Guard

Career history
- 2002: Detroit Shock
- Stats at Basketball Reference
Medals
Representing Spain
Women's basketball
European Championships
Bronze medal – third place	2001 France	Team competition
Bronze medal – third place	2003 Greece	Team competition

Begoña García Piñero (born 1 March 1976) is a Spanish former basketball player who competed in the 2004 Summer Olympics.

== Career statistics ==
Legend
GP	Games played	GS	Games started	MPG	Minutes per game	RPG	Rebounds per game
APG	Assists per game	SPG	Steals per game	BPG	Blocks per game	PPG	Points per game
TO	Turnovers per game	FG%	Field-goal percentage	3P%	3-point field-goal percentage	FT%	Free-throw percentage
**Bold**	Career best	°	League leader

=== WNBA ===
WNBA regular season statistics
Year	Team	GP	GS	MPG	FG%	3P%	FT%	RPG	APG	SPG	BPG	TO	PPG
2002	Detroit	8	0	8.0	.182	.333	.500	0.5	1.1	0.4	0.0	1.4	1.0
**Career**	1 year, 1 team	8	0	8.0	.182	.333	.500	0.5	1.1	0.4	0.0	1.4	1.0
