= Katarina Lazić =

Yugoslavian and Serbian basketball player (born 1980)

Personal information
- Born: May 25, 1980 (age 46) Belgrade, SFR Yugoslavia
- Listed height: 1.78 m (5 ft 10 in)
- Listed weight: 67 kg (148 lb)

Career information
- Playing career: 1995–2002
- Position: Shooting guard

Career history
- 1995–1998: Crvena zvezda
- 1998–1999: Hemofarm
- 2000–2001: Basket Laghi Varese
- 2001: New York Liberty
- 2002: Crvena zvezda
- Stats at Basketball Reference

Katarina Lazić, (Serbian Cyrillic: Катарина Лазић, born May 25, 1980, in Belgrade, SFR Yugoslavia) is a former Yugoslavian and Serbian female basketball player.

== See also ==
- List of Serbian WNBA players
