= Rhondda Rebels =

The Rhondda Rebels is a women's basketball team from Rhondda in south Wales, who compete in Division 1 of the English Women's Basketball League. The team play their home games at the Rhondda Fach Sports Centre and is one of the most successful women's teams in recent history, claiming the league crown in 2001, 2004, 2005 and 2006.
