= List of WNBA career blocks leaders =

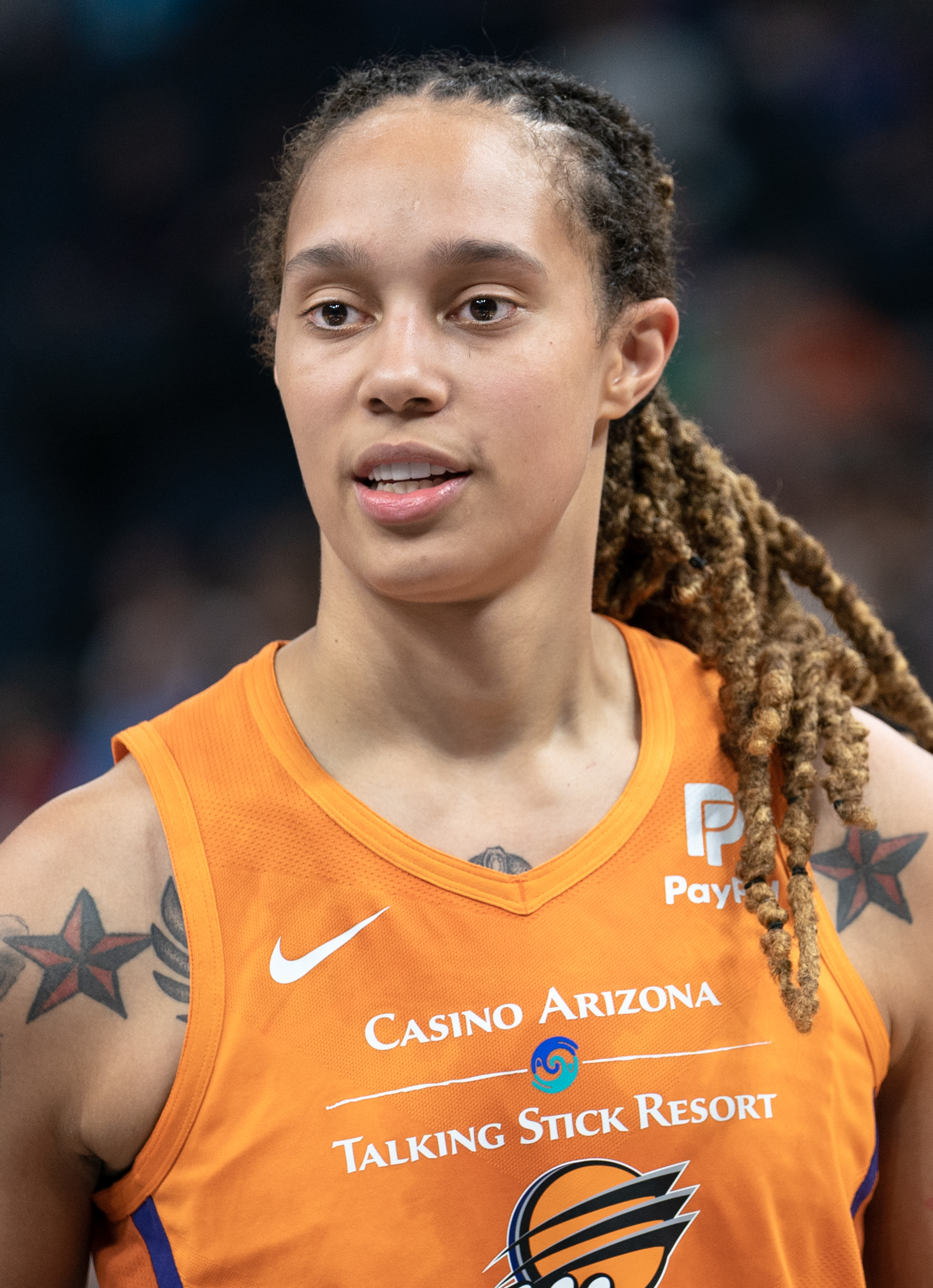
Brittney Griner has the most blocks in WNBA history.

The following is a list of players who have achieved the most blocks during their WNBA careers.

== Blocks leaders ==
Statistics accurate as of the 2026 season.

^	Active WNBA player
*	Inducted into the Naismith Memorial Basketball Hall of Fame
^{†}	Not yet eligible for Hall of Fame consideration (Note: A player is not eligible for induction into the Naismith Memorial Basketball Hall of Fame until she has been fully retired for two calendar years.)
§	1st time eligible for Hall of Fame in 2025

WNBA Most blocks recorded
Rank	Player	Pos	Team(s) played for (years)	Total blocks	Games played (Note: Games played in prior seasons where blocks were not recorded are not included in total games played nor are they used in calculating the per game average.)	Blocks per game average (Note: Average is rounded to the nearest hundredth and its calculation does not include games played in seasons before blocks were officially recorded.)
1	Brittney Griner^	C	Phoenix Mercury (2013–2024); Atlanta Dream (2025); Connecticut Sun (2026–present)	891	372	2.40
2	Margo Dydek	C	Utah Starzz/San Antonio Silver Stars (1998–2004); Connecticut Sun (2005–2007); Los Angeles Sparks (2008)	877	323	2.72
3	Lisa Leslie*	C	Los Angeles Sparks (1997–2009) (Note: Leslie did not play the 2007 season because of a pregnancy leave.)	822	363	2.26
4	Sylvia Fowles*	C	Chicago Sky (2008–2014); Minnesota Lynx (2015–2022)	721	408	1.77
5	Candace Parker*	F/C	Los Angeles Sparks (2008–2020); Chicago Sky (2021–2022); Las Vegas Aces (2023)	619	410	1.51
6	A'ja Wilson^	C	Las Vegas Aces (2018–present)	612	308	1.99
7	Lauren Jackson*	F/C	Seattle Storm (2001–2012)	586	317	1.85
8	Tangela Smith	C	Sacramento Monarchs (1998–2004); Charlotte Sting (2005–2006); Phoenix Mercury (2007–2010); Indiana Fever (2011); San Antonio Silver Stars (2012)	556	463	1.20
9	Tammy Sutton-Brown	C	Charlotte Sting (2001–2006); Indiana Fever (2007–2012)	555	388	1.43
10	Elizabeth Williams^	C/F	Connecticut Sun (2015); Atlanta Dream (2016–2021); Washington Mystics (2022); Chicago Sky (2023–present)	522	374	1.4
11	Ruth Riley	C	Miami Sol (2001–2002); Detroit Shock (2003–2006); San Antonio Silver Stars (2007–2011); Chicago Sky (2012); Atlanta Dream (2013–2014)	505	387	1.30
12	Breanna Stewart^	F	Seattle Storm (2016–2022); New York Liberty (2023–present)	478	334	1.43
13	Jonquel Jones^	C	Connecticut Sun (2016–2022); New York Liberty (2023–present)	452	349	1.30
14	Taj McWilliams-Franklin	F/C	Orlando Miracle/Connecticut Sun (1999–2006); Los Angeles Sparks (2007); Washington Mystics (2008); Detroit Shock (2008–2009); New York Liberty (2010); Minnesota Lynx (2011–2012)	443	440	1.01
15	Tina Charles^{†}	C	Connecticut Sun (2010–2013, 2025); New York Liberty (2014–2019); Washington Mystics (2020–2021) (Note: Charles did not play the 2020 season due to the COVID-19 pandemic.); Phoenix Mercury (2022); Seattle Storm (2022); Atlanta Dream (2024)	428	473	0.90
16	Michelle Snow	C	Houston Comets (2002–2008); Atlanta Dream (2009); San Antonio Silver Stars (2010); Chicago Sky (2011); Washington Mystics (2012–2013); Los Angeles Sparks (2015)	404	402	1.00
17	Natasha Howard^	F	Indiana Fever (2014–2015); Minnesota Lynx (2016–2017, 2026–present); Seattle Storm (2018–2020); New York Liberty (2021–2022); Dallas Wings (2023–2024); Indiana Fever (2025)	401	424	0.95
18	Kiah Stokes^	C	New York Liberty (2015–2021); Las Vegas Aces (2021–2025); Golden State Valkyries (2026–present)	390	363	1.07
19	Tamika Catchings*	F	Indiana Fever (2002–2016)	385	457	0.84
20	DeWanna Bonner^	F	Phoenix Mercury (2009–2019, 2025–2026); Connecticut Sun (2020–2024); Indiana Fever (2025); Atlanta Dream (2026–present)	372	577	0.64
21	Tina Thompson*	F	Houston Comets (1997–2008); Los Angeles Sparks (2009–2011); Seattle Storm (2012–2013)	372	496	0.75
22	Ezi Magbegor^	C	Seattle Storm (2020–present)	371	220	1.69
23	Erika de Souza	F/C	Los Angeles Sparks (2002); Connecticut Sun (2007); Atlanta Dream (2008–2015); Chicago Sky (2015–2016); San Antonio Stars (2017)	370	329	1.12
24	Jessica Breland	F	New York Liberty (2011); Connecticut Sun (2011); Indiana Fever (2013); Chicago Sky (2014–2017); Atlanta Dream (2018–2019); Indiana Fever (2021) (Note: Breland did not play the 2020 season due to COVID-19 pandemic.)	367	269	1.36
25	Diana Taurasi^{†}	G	Phoenix Mercury (2014–2024) (Note: Taurasi did not play the 2015 season at the request of her Russian Premier League team, UMMC Ekaterinburg.)	351	565	0.62

== Progressive list of block leaders ==
This is a progressive list of block leaders showing how the record increased through the years.

Statistics accurate as of the 2026 season.

^	Active WNBA player
*	Inducted into the Naismith Memorial Basketball Hall of Fame
^{†}	Not yet eligible for Hall of Fame consideration (Note: A player is not eligible for induction into the Naismith Memorial Basketball Hall of Fame until she has been fully retired for three calendar years.)

Team abbreviationsTeam(s) listed is the one player was on when she established the record.
ATL	Atlanta Dream	LAS	Los Angeles Sparks	PHO	Phoenix Mercury
CHI	Chicago Sky	LVA	Las Vegas Aces	SEA	Seattle Storm
CON	Connecticut Sun	MIN	Minnesota Lynx	UTA	Utah Starzz

Blocks leader at the end of every season
Season	Year-by-year leader	Blocks	Active player leader	Total blocks	Career record	Total blocks	Single-season record	Blocks	Season
1997	Elena BaranovaUTA	63	Elena BaranovaUTA	63	Elena BaranovaUTA	63	Elena BaranovaUTA	63	1997
1998	Margo DydekUTA	114	Lisa Leslie*LAS	119	Lisa Leslie*LAS	119	Margo DydekUTA	114	1998
1999	Margo DydekUTA	77	Margo DydekUTA	191	Margo DydekUTA	191	Margo DydekUTA	114	1999
2000	Margo DydekUTA	96	Margo DydekUTA	287	Margo DydekUTA	287	Margo DydekUTA	114	2000
2001	Margo DydekUTA	113	Margo DydekUTA	400	Margo DydekUTA	400	Margo DydekUTA	114	2001
2002	Margo DydekUTA	107	Margo DydekUTA	507	Margo DydekUTA	507	Margo DydekUTA	114	2002
2003	Margo DydekUTA	100	Margo DydekUTA	607	Margo DydekUTA	607	Margo DydekUTA	114	2003
2004	Lisa Leslie*LAS	98	Margo DydekUTA	655	Margo DydekUTA	655	Margo DydekUTA	114	2004
2005	Lisa Leslie*LAS	71	Margo DydekUTA	726	Margo DydekUTA	726	Margo DydekUTA	114	2005
2005	Margo DydekCON	71	Margo DydekUTA	726	Margo DydekUTA	726	Margo DydekUTA	114	2005
2006	Margo DydekCON	85	Margo DydekUTA	811	Margo DydekUTA	811	Margo DydekUTA	114	2006
2007	Margo DydekCON	66	Margo DydekUTA	877	Margo DydekUTA	877	Margo DydekUTA	114	2007
2008	Lisa Leslie*LAS	97	Margo DydekUTA	877	Margo DydekUTA	877	Margo DydekUTA	114	2008
2009	Tangela SmithPHO	57	Lisa Leslie*LAS	822	Margo DydekUTA	877	Margo DydekUTA	114	2009
2010	Sylvia Fowles*CHI	88	Lauren Jackson*SEA	568	Margo DydekUTA	877	Margo DydekUTA	114	2010
2011	Sylvia Fowles*CHI	68	Lauren Jackson*SEA	579	Margo DydekUTA	877	Margo DydekUTA	114	2011
2012	Candace Parker*LAS	76	Lauren Jackson*SEA	586	Margo DydekUTA	877	Margo DydekUTA	114	2012
2013	Brittney Griner^PHO	81	Ruth RileyATL	505	Margo DydekUTA	877	Margo DydekUTA	114	2013
2014	Brittney Griner^PHO	129	Sylvia Fowles*CHI	376	Margo DydekUTA	877	Brittney Griner^PHO	129	2014
2015	Brittney Griner^PHO	105	Sylvia Fowles*CHI	404	Margo DydekUTA	877	Brittney Griner^PHO	129	2015
2016	Brittney Griner^PHO	107	Sylvia Fowles*CHI	465	Margo DydekUTA	877	Brittney Griner^PHO	129	2016
2017	Sylvia Fowles*MIN	67	Sylvia Fowles*CHI	532	Margo DydekUTA	877	Brittney Griner^PHO	129	2017
2017	Elizabeth Williams^ATL	67	Sylvia Fowles*CHI	532	Margo DydekUTA	877	Brittney Griner^PHO	129	2017
2018	Brittney Griner^PHO	87	Sylvia Fowles*MIN	574	Margo DydekUTA	877	Brittney Griner^PHO	129	2018
2018	Brittney Griner^PHO	87	Brittney Griner^PHO	574	Margo DydekUTA	877	Brittney Griner^PHO	129	2018
2019	Jonquel Jones^CON	68	Brittney Griner^PHO	636	Margo DydekUTA	877	Brittney Griner^PHO	129	2019
2020	A'ja Wilson^LVA	44	Brittney Griner^PHO	658	Margo DydekUTA	877	Brittney Griner^PHO	129	2020
2021	Brittney Griner^PHO	58	Brittney Griner^PHO	716	Margo DydekUTA	877	Brittney Griner^PHO	129	2021
2022	A'ja Wilson^LVA	70	Sylvia Fowles*MIN	721	Margo DydekUTA	877	Brittney Griner^PHO	129	2022
2023	A'ja Wilson^LVA	89	Brittney Griner^PHO	766	Margo DydekUTA	877	Brittney Griner^PHO	129	2023
2024	A'ja Wilson^LVA	98	Brittney Griner^PHO	812	Margo DydekUTA	877	Brittney Griner^PHO	129	2024
2025	Ezi Magbegor^SEA	96	Brittney Griner^PHO	859	Margo DydekUTA	877	Brittney Griner^PHO	129	2025
2026	A'ja Wilson^LVA	79	Brittney Griner^PHO	891	Margo DydekUTA	877	Brittney Griner^PHO	129	2026
Season	Year-by-year leader	Blocks	Active player leader	Total blocks	Career record	Total blocks	Single-season record	Blocks	Season

== See also ==
- List of National Basketball Association career blocks leaders
- List of National Basketball Association season blocks leaders
