= 1999 Utah Starzz season =

- Head coach: Frank Layden (retired Jun. 21, 2–2 record), Fred Williams (13–15 record)
- Arena: Delta Center

Results
- Record: 15–17 (.469)
- Place: 6th (Western)
- Playoff finish: Did not qualify

The 1999 WNBA season was the 3rd for the Utah Starzz. The Starzz finished last in the West, despite improving to a 15-17 mark. The team started with coach Frank Layden, who resigned after a 2-2 record so he could retire.

== Transactions ==
=== Minnesota Lynx expansion draft ===
The following player was selected in the Minnesota Lynx expansion draft from the Utah Starzz:

Player	Nationality	School/Team/Country
Kim Williams	United States	DePaul

=== WNBA draft ===
Round	Pick	Player	Nationality	School/Team/Country
1	3	Natalie Williams	United States	Portland Power
2	15	Debbie Black	United States	Colorado Xplosion
3	27	Adrienne Goodson	United States	Chicago Condors
4	39	Dalma Iványi	Hungary	FIU

=== Transactions ===
Date	Transaction
April 6, 1999	Lost Kim Williams to the Minnesota Lynx in the WNBA expansion draft
April 30, 1999	Waived Jessie Hicks
May 4, 1999	Drafted Natalie Williams, Debbie Black, Adrienne Goodson and Dalma Iványi in the 1999 WNBA draft
May 6, 1999	Waived Erin Alexander
June 9, 1999	Waived Dena Head and Tammi Reiss
June 21, 1999	Waived Chantel Tremitiere
June 21, 1999	Head Coach Frank Layden retires from coaching
June 21, 1999	Hired Fred Williams as Head Coach
July 6, 1999	Signed Chantel Tremitiere and Tricia Bader Binford
July 12, 1999	Waived Michelle Campbell
July 30, 1999	Traded Wendy Palmer and Olympia Scott to the Detroit Shock in exchange for Cindy Brown and Korie Hlede
December 15, 1999	Traded Elena Baranova and a 2000 2nd Round Pick to the Miami Sol in exchange for Kate Starbird and a 2000 1st Round Pick

== Roster ==
1999 Utah Starzz roster
Players
Coaches

Pos.	No.	Nat.	Name	Height	Weight	DOB	From	Yrs
G/F	34	(United States)	Bader Binford, Tricia	5' 4" (1.63m)	125 lb (57kg)	1973-02-26	Boise State	1
F	28	(Soviet Union)	Baranova, Elena	6' 5" (1.96m)	182 lb (83kg)	1972-01-28		2
G	31	(United States)	Black, Debbie	5' 3" (1.6m)	124 lb (56kg)	1966-07-29	Saint Joseph's	R
F	14	(United States)	Brown, Cindy	6' 2" (1.88m)	183 lb (83kg)	1965-03-16	Long Beach State	1
C	5	(United States)	Campbell, Michelle	6' 5" (1.96m)	170 lb (77kg)	1973-02-20	USC	R
C	12	(Polish People's Republic)	Dydek, Margo	7' 2" (2.18m)	223 lb (101kg)	1974-04-28		1
F	15	(United States)	Goodson, Adrienne	6' 0" (1.83m)	165 lb (75kg)	1966-10-19	Old Dominion	R
G	7	(Socialist Federal Republic of Yugoslavia)	Hlede, Korie	5' 9" (1.75m)	155 lb (70kg)	1975-03-29	Duquesne	1
G	7	(Hungarian People's Republic)	Iványi, Dalma	5' 10" (1.78m)	135 lb (61kg)	1976-03-13	FIU	R
F	24	(United States)	Johnson, LaTonya	6' 1" (1.85m)	150 lb (68kg)	1975-08-17	Memphis	1
G	27	(Polish People's Republic)	Lara, Krystyna	5' 8" (1.73m)	130 lb (59kg)	1969-09-30		R
F	14	(United States)	Palmer, Wendy	6' 2" (1.88m)	165 lb (75kg)	1974-08-12	Virginia	2
C	0	(United States)	Scott, Olympia	6' 2" (1.88m)	175 lb (79kg)	1976-05-05	Stanford	1
G	3	(United States)	Tremitiere, Chantel	5' 6" (1.68m)	142 lb (64kg)	1969-10-20	Auburn	2
C	24	(United States)	Williams, Natalie	6' 2" (1.88m)	210 lb (95kg)	1970-11-30	UCLA	R

Head coach
(United States) Fred Williams (Boise State)

Legend

- (C) Team captain
- (DP) Unsigned draft pick
- (FA) Free agent
- (S) Suspended
- Injured

== Schedule ==
=== Regular season ===
1999 game log
Total: 15–17 (Home: 11–5; Road: 4–12)
June: 2–6 (Home: 2–2; Road: 0–4)

Game	Date	Team	Score	High points	High rebounds	High assists	Location Attendance	Record
1	June 12	Orlando	W 71–65	Wendy Palmer (22)	Natalie Williams (12)	Goodson; Palmer (4)	Delta Center	1–0
2	June 14	@ Minnesota	L 54–78	Natalie Williams (18)	Natalie Williams (12)	Elena Baranova (3)	Target Center	1–1
3	June 17	@ Houston	L 73–93	Wendy Palmer (18)	Natalie Williams (16)	Debbie Black (3)	Compaq Center	1–2
4	June 19	Sacramento	W 85–75	Natalie Williams (26)	Natalie Williams (8)	Debbie Black (7)	Delta Center	2–2
5	June 24	@ Sacramento	L 69–107	Wendy Palmer (18)	Natalie Williams (10)	Debbie Black (4)	ARCO Arena	2–3
6	June 26	Minnesota	L 62–72	Margo Dydek (19)	Baranova; Dydek (8)	Baranova; Black (4)	Delta Center	2–4
7	June 28	@ Los Angeles	L 70–102	Natalie Williams (28)	Natalie Williams (12)	Debbie Black (4)	Great Western Forum	2–5
8	June 30	Houston	L 68–78	Natalie Williams (23)	Baranova; Williams (6)	Debbie Black (8)	Delta Center	2–6

July : 6–8 (Home: 4–2; Road: 2–6)

Game	Date	Team	Score	High points	High rebounds	High assists	Location Attendance	Record
9	July 2	Cleveland	W 83–68	Margo Dydek (20)	Natalie Williams (12)	Debbie Black (8)	Delta Center	3–6
10	July 6	Detroit	W 104–94 (2OT)	Natalie Williams (31)	Margo Dydek (16)	Debbie Black (10)	Delta Center	4–6
11	July 8	@ Washington	W 81–65	Wendy Palmer (17)	Natalie Williams (7)	Debbie Black (7)	MCI Center	5–6
12	July 10	@ Orlando	L 56–62	Natalie Williams (23)	Natalie Williams (12)	Wendy Palmer (5)	TD Waterhouse Centre	5–7
13	July 12	Phoenix	L 66–80	Dydek; Williams (22)	Dydek; Williams (9)	Black; Goodson (4)	Delta Center	5–8
14	July 16	Houston	L 84–88 (OT)	Margo Dydek (24)	Dydek; Williams (8)	Elena Baranova (7)	Delta Center	5–9
15	July 18	@ New York	L 82–88 (OT)	Natalie Williams (24)	Natalie Williams (7)	Debbie Black (6)	Madison Square Garden	5–10
16	July 19	@ Charlotte	L 66–73	Adrienne Goodson (18)	Adrienne Goodson (9)	Adrienne Goodson (5)	Charlotte Coliseum	5–11
17	July 21	@ Detroit	L 77–86	Margo Dydek (22)	Adrienne Goodson (7)	Debbie Black (9)	The Palace of Auburn Hills	5–12
18	July 24	@ Cleveland	W 76–70	Adrienne Goodson (20)	Black; Dydek (7)	Debbie Black (11)	Gund Arena	6–12
19	July 26	Washington	W 73–61	Natalie Williams (23)	Black; Williams (7)	Debbie Black (6)	Delta Center	7–12
20	July 27	@ Phoenix	L 73–86	Adrienne Goodson (17)	Margo Dydek (8)	Debbie Black (6)	America West Arena	7–13
21	July 30	@ Los Angeles	L 77–87	Margo Dydek (19)	Margo Dydek (11)	Goodson; Johnson (3)	Great Western Forum	7–14
22	July 31	Sacramento	W 63–59	Margo Dydek (25)	Debbie Black (6)	LaTonya Johnson (4)	Delta Center	8–14

August : 7–3 (Home: 5–1; Road: 2–2)

Game	Date	Team	Score	High points	High rebounds	High assists	Location Attendance	Record
23	August 3	New York	L 59–61	Goodson; Hlede (12)	Brown; Dydek (5)	Debbie Black (3)	Delta Center	8–15
24	August 5	Los Angeles	W 81–75	Natalie Williams (17)	Natalie Williams (11)	Debbie Black (6)	Delta Center	9–15
25	August 7	Minnesota	W 80–70	Margo Dydek (19)	Margo Dydek (8)	Dydek; Goodson; Johnson (4)	Delta Center	10–15
26	August 9	Charlotte	W 67–65	Dydek; Goodson (14)	Natalie Williams (11)	Margo Dydek (6)	Delta Center	11–15
27	August 11	@ Minnesota	L 73–83	Korie Hlede (20)	Natalie Williams (8)	Debbie Black (5)	Delta Center	11–16
28	August 13	Phoenix	W 67–64	Margo Dydek (17)	Natalie Williams (10)	Debbie Black (6)	Great Western Forum	12–16
29	August 14	@ Sacramento	W 97–89	Adrienne Goodson (23)	Natalie Williams (10)	Korie Hlede (7)	ARCO Arena	13–16
30	August 16	@ Houston	L 71–80	Natalie Williams (24)	Natalie Williams (8)	Black; Hlede (4)	Compaq Center	13–17
31	August 20	@ Phoenix	W 70–62	Adrienne Goodson (22)	Natalie Williams (12)	Debbie Black (4)	America West Arena	14–17
32	August 21	Los Angeles	W 89–81	Adrienne Goodson (20)	Natalie Williams (9)	Debbie Black (9)	Delta Center	15–17

1999 season schedule

=== Season standings ===
Western Conference	W	L	PCT	Conf.	GB
Houston Comets ^{x}	26	6	.813	16–4	–
Los Angeles Sparks ^{x}	20	12	.625	12–8	6.0
Sacramento Monarchs ^{x}	19	13	.594	9–11	7.0
Phoenix Mercury ^{o}	15	17	.469	7–13	11.0
Minnesota Lynx ^{o}	15	17	.469	8–12	11.0
Utah Starzz ^{o}	15	17	.469	8–12	11.0

== Statistics ==
Legend
GP	Games played	GS	Games started	MPG	Minutes per game	RPG	Rebounds per game
APG	Assists per game	SPG	Steals per game	BPG	Blocks per game	PPG	Points per game
FG%	Field-goal percentage	3P%	3-point field-goal percentage	FT%	Free-throw percentage	TO	Turnovers per game
PF	Fouls per game		Team leader		League leader

=== Regular season ===
Player	GP	GS	MPG	FG%	3P%	FT%	RPG	APG	SPG	BPG	PPG
Natalie Williams	28	26	34.1	.519	.000	.754	9.2	0.9	1.4	0.8	18.0
Adrienne Goodson	32	31	33.4	.426	.245	.767	4.3	2.7	0.8	0.3	14.9
Debbie Black	32	32	31.7	.378	.195	.620	3.5	5.0	2.4	0.2	5.1
Korie Hlede	11	1	25.2	.463	.448	.909	2.7	2.5	0.7	0.1	11.9
LaTonya Johnson	31	18	23.2	.365	.293	.810	1.7	1.6	0.7	0.3	6.5
Margo Dydek	32	28	22.9	.498	.350	.857	6.4	1.8	0.4	2.4	12.6
Wendy Palmer	20	4	22.3	.404	.300	.647	4.2	1.5	0.2	0.4	8.4
Elena Baranova	29	19	19.7	.405	.417	.805	3.4	1.6	0.7	0.8	6.0
Cindy Brown	9	0	17.3	.344	.100	.688	3.7	1.1	1.0	0.2	3.8
Chantel Tremitiere	20	0	9.6	.310	.250	1.000	1.0	1.1	0.3	0.0	1.1
Olympia Scott	4	0	9.0	.300	N/A	.500	2.0	0.5	0.3	0.0	2.3
Krystyna Lara	25	0	8.2	.338	.303	1.000	0.5	0.9	0.4	0.1	2.5
Tricia Bader Binford	7	0	4.9	.000	.000	1.000	0.3	0.1	0.4	0.1	0.3
Dalma Iványi	14	1	4.8	.333	.000	.750	0.4	0.5	0.3	0.0	0.8
Michelle Campbell	8	0	3.8	.300	.000	.500	0.8	0.3	0.0	0.0	1.0

^{‡}Waived/Released during the season
^{†}Traded during the season
^{≠}Acquired during the season
