= Megan Compain =

New Zealand basketball player

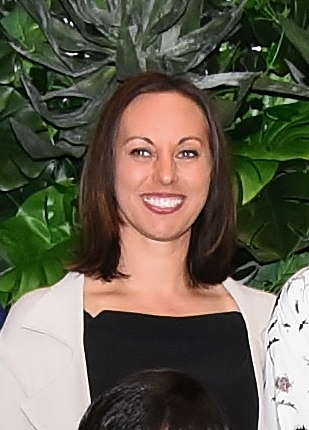
- Compain in 2018

Personal information
- Born: 18 September 1975 (age 51)
- Listed height: 175 cm (5 ft 9 in)
- Position: Guard
- Stats at Basketball Reference

Megan Helen Compain (born 18 September 1975) is a New Zealand former basketball player who competed in the 2000 Summer Olympics and in the 2004 Summer Olympics. As of 2024, she was a Basketball New Zealand board member. She played for the Utah Starzz during the 1997 season, becoming the first New Zealander to play in the WNBA.

== Biography ==
She was born 18 September 1975 in Whanganui, New Zealand. As an exchange student she attended Middle Township High School in New Jersey. She competed in the 2000 Summer Olympics and in the 2004 Summer Olympics.

== Career statistics ==
Legend
GP	Games played	GS	Games started	MPG	Minutes per game	RPG	Rebounds per game
APG	Assists per game	SPG	Steals per game	BPG	Blocks per game	PPG	Points per game
TO	Turnovers per game	FG%	Field-goal percentage	3P%	3-point field-goal percentage	FT%	Free-throw percentage
**Bold**	Career best	°	League leader

=== WNBA ===
==== Regular season ====
Year	Team	GP	GS	MPG	FG%	3P%	FT%	RPG	APG	SPG	BPG	TO	PPG
1997	Utah	5	0	3.8	.286	.250	–	1.0	.4	.8	.2	1.2	1.0
