= Wendy Palmer =

American basketball player and coach (born 1974)

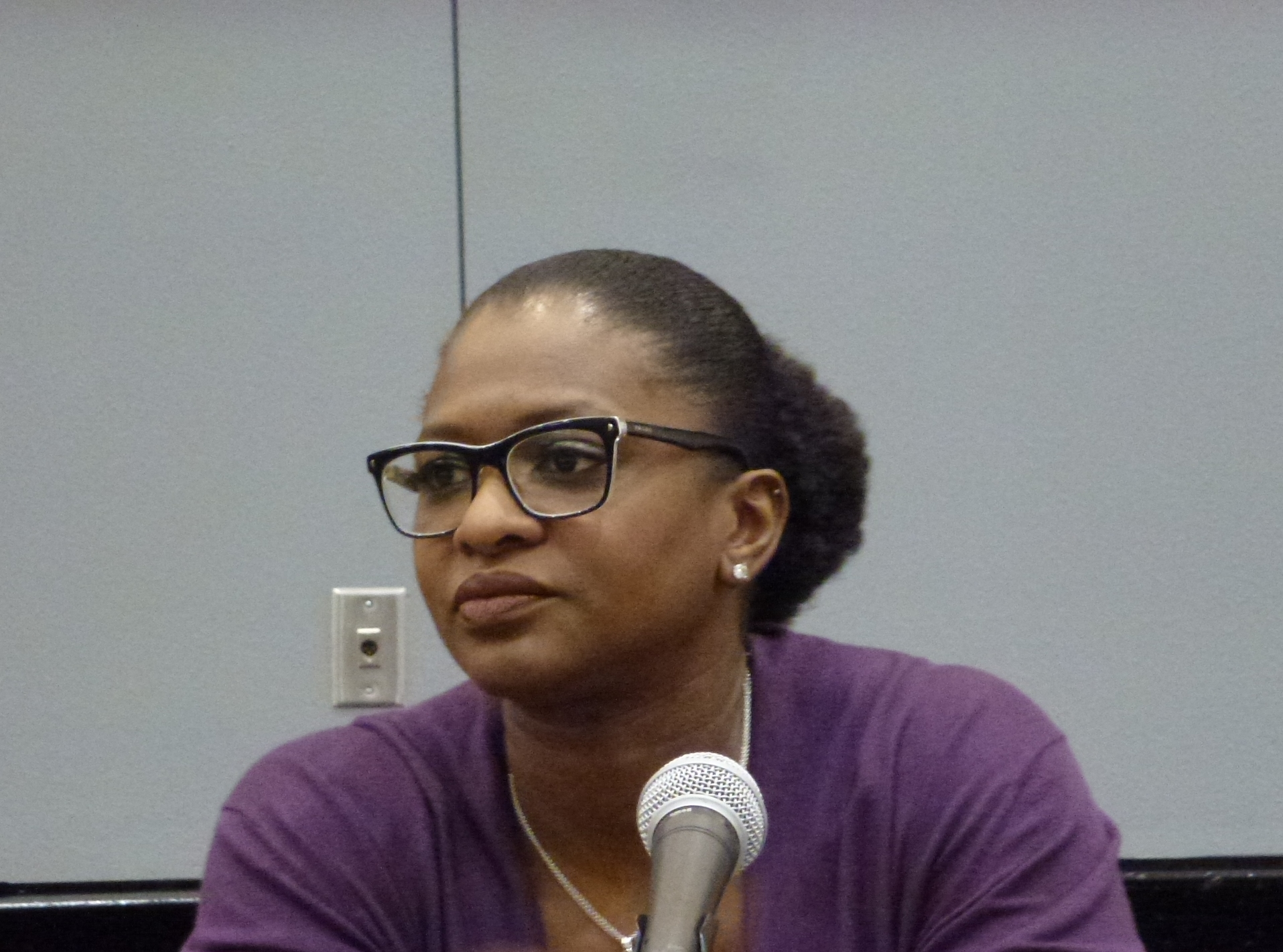
- Palmer in 2012

Personal information
- Born: August 12, 1974 (age 52) Timberlake, North Carolina, U.S.
- Listed height: 6 ft 2 in (1.88 m)
- Listed weight: 165 lb (75 kg)

Career information
- High school: Person (Roxboro, North Carolina)
- College: Virginia (1992–1996)
- WNBA draft: 1997: Elite draft
- Drafted by: Utah Starzz
- Playing career: 1997–2007
- Position: Forward
- Number: 14, 4, 3, 0

Career history
- 1997–1999: Utah Starzz
- 1999–2002: Detroit Shock
- 2002: Orlando Miracle
- 2003–2004: Connecticut Sun
- 2005: San Antonio Silver Stars
- 2006–2007: Seattle Storm

Career highlights
- WNBA All-Star (2000); All-WNBA Second Team (1997); WNBA Most Improved Player (2004); 2× Second-team All-American – AP (1995, 1996); 2× All-American – Kodak, USBWA (1995, 1996); 2× ACC Player of the Year (1995, 1996); 3× First-team All-ACC (1994–1996); ACC All-Freshman Team (1993); North Carolina Miss Basketball (1992)
- Stats at WNBA.com
- Stats at Basketball Reference
Medals
Women's basketball
Representing United States
Jones Cup
| Gold medal – first place | 1994 Taipei | Team competition |

Wendy Palmer (born August 12, 1974) is an American former professional basketball player in the WNBA, and former head coach of the UNCG women's basketball team. Her primary position was forward.

== High school ==
Born in Timberlake, North Carolina, Palmer attended Person High School in Roxboro, North Carolina, where she was named a High School All-American by the WBCA. She participated in the inaugural WBCA High School All-America Game in 1992, scoring eleven points. She was also honored as the 1991–92 NCHSAA Female Athlete of the Year.

== College ==
Palmer graduated from the University of Virginia in 1996, and is a member of the Zeta Phi Beta sorority.

== USA Basketball ==
Palmer was named to the team representing the US at the 1994 William Jones Cup competition in Taipei, Taiwan. The USA team won all eight games, winning the gold medal, but not without close calls. In three games the teams had to come from behind to win. One preliminary game ended up as a single-point victory, and the gold medal game went to overtime before the USA team beat South Korea by a single point, 90–89. Palmer was the leading scorer for the team, averaging 18.9 points per game. She also led the team in rebounding with 9.3 per game.

== WNBA career ==
Palmer was originally drafted by the Utah Starzz 9th overall in the 2nd round of the 1997 Elite draft. She played for the Starzz until 1999, when she became a member of the Detroit Shock.

In 2002, she played for the Orlando Miracle, which later became the Connecticut Sun. In 2004, while as a member of the Sun, she received the WNBA Most Improved Player Award.

In 2005, she played for the San Antonio Silver Stars. After the season ended, she was hired as an assistant coach to the women's basketball team at Virginia Commonwealth University.

In 2006, she signed a free agent contract with the Storm, but played only five games with the team before suffering a partially torn Achilles tendon in her left foot. She never played in the WNBA again after her foot injury, and thus her final game ever was during her time with the Storm. Palmer's final game was played on August 26, 2007, in a 89–95 loss to the Phoenix Mercury where she recorded 8 points, 1 rebound, and 1 block.

== Career statistics ==
Legend
| GP | Games played | GS | Games started | MPG | Minutes per game | RPG | Rebounds per game |
| APG | Assists per game | SPG | Steals per game | BPG | Blocks per game | PPG | Points per game |
| TO | Turnovers per game | FG% | Field-goal percentage | 3P% | 3-point field-goal percentage | FT% | Free-throw percentage |
| **Bold** | Career best | ° | League leader |

=== Regular season ===
| Year | Team | GP | GS | MPG | FG% | 3P% | FT% | RPG | APG | SPG | BPG | TO | PPG |
|---|---|---|---|---|---|---|---|---|---|---|---|---|---|
| 1997 | Utah | 28 | 28 | **33.4** | 37.4 | 25.0 | 67.6 | 8.0 | **1.7** | **1.7** | 0.2 | 2.5 | **15.8** |
| 1998 | Utah | 28 | 21 | 27.2 | 47.2 | 35.3 | 65.3 | 6.6 | 1.1 | 0.6 | 0.2 | 2.0 | 13.5 |
| 1999 | Utah | 20 | 4 | 22.3 | 40.4 | 30.0 | 64.7 | 4.2 | 1.5 | 0.2 | 0.4 | 1.6 | 8.4 |
| 1999 | Detroit | 11 | 10 | 26.8 | 47.0 | 25.0 | 76.4 | **9.5** | 1.1 | 0.5 | 0.4 | 2.4 | 12.7 |
| 2000 | Detroit | 32 | 30 | 28.6 | 44.8 | 25.0 | 70.4 | 6.8 | 1.2 | 0.6 | 0.3 | 2.0 | 13.8 |
| 2001 | Detroit | 22 | 22 | 29.6 | 42.3 | 33.3 | 67.8 | 7.0 | 1.0 | 1.0 | 0.2 | 2.2 | 10.6 |
| 2002 | Detroit | 16 | 16 | 29.0 | 42.5 | 31.7 | 66.0 | 6.0 | 1.3 | 0.8 | 0.1 | 2.1 | 11.5 |
| 2002 | Orlando | 16 | 16 | 31.3 | 43.9 | 38.3 | 69.2 | 5.8 | 1.3 | 1.4 | 0.4 | 1.4 | 11.3 |
| 2003 | Connecticut | 32 | 1 | 13.5 | 39.5 | 21.7 | **82.1** | 3.3 | 0.5 | 0.3 | 0.1 | **1.1** | 4.7 |
| 2004 | Connecticut | 33 | **33** | 23.8 | 42.7 | 31.7 | 80.0 | 5.5 | 0.9 | 0.7 | 0.2 | 1.2 | 9.0 |
| 2005 | San Antonio | **34** | 29 | 25.9 | **51.7** | **42.9** | 74.3 | 5.7 | 1.0 | 0.6 | 0.2 | 1.2 | 9.6 |
| 2006 | Seattle | 5 | 2 | 24.0 | 48.5 | 33.3 | 73.7 | 7.6 | 0.6 | 1.0 | **0.6** | 2.0 | 9.4 |
| 2007 | Seattle | **34** | 3 | 13.9 | 41.7 | 14.3 | 78.2 | 4.3 | 0.5 | 0.4 | 0.2 | **1.1** | 4.6 |
| Career | 11 years, 6 teams | 311 | 215 | 24.6 | 43.4 | 30.7 | 70.7 | 5.9 | 1.0 | 0.7 | 0.2 | 1.7 | 10.1 |

=== Playoffs ===
| Year | Team | GP | GS | MPG | FG% | 3P% | FT% | RPG | APG | SPG | BPG | TO | PPG |
|---|---|---|---|---|---|---|---|---|---|---|---|---|---|
| 1999 | Detroit | 1 | 1 | **37.0** | 36.4 | 0.0 | **66.7** | **9.0** | **2.0** | **1.0** | **1.0** | **1.0** | **10.0** |
| 2003 | Connecticut | 4 | 0 | 16.0 | **59.1** | 25.0 | **66.7** | 3.0 | 0.8 | 0.0 | 0.0 | 1.8 | 7.3 |
| 2004 | Connecticut | **8** | **8** | 19.5 | 36.7 | 25.0 | 62.5 | 4.4 | 0.1 | 0.4 | 0.4 | **1.0** | 5.5 |
| 2007 | Seattle | 2 | 0 | 13.5 | 50.0 | **50.0** | 0.0 | 4.0 | 0.0 | 0.0 | 0.5 | **1.0** | 8.5 |
| Career | 4 years, 3 teams | 15 | 9 | 18.9 | 43.9 | 25.0 | 60.0 | 4.3 | 0.4 | 0.3 | 0.3 | 1.2 | 6.7 |

=== College ===
| Year | Team | GP | GS | MPG | FG% | 3P% | FT% | RPG | APG | SPG | BPG | TO | PPG |
|---|---|---|---|---|---|---|---|---|---|---|---|---|---|
| 1992–93 | Virginia | 31 | - | - | **61.4** | 0.0 | 47.3 | 6.9 | 0.7 | 1.3 | **0.4** | - | 11.7 |
| 1993–94 | Virginia | **32** | - | - | 56.8 | **100.0** | 59.9 | 7.1 | 1.9 | **2.3** | **0.4** | - | 16.9 |
| 1994–95 | Virginia | 31 | - | - | 56.6 | 40.5 | **64.2** | 10.5 | **2.0** | 1.6 | 0.1 | - | **17.6** |
| 1995–96 | Virginia | 32 | - | - | 47.8 | 25.9 | 59.4 | **11.2** | **2.0** | 1.8 | 0.3 | - | 14.6 |
| **Career** | | 126 | - | - | 55.2 | 32.3 | 58.2 | 8.9 | 1.6 | 1.7 | 0.3 | - | 15.2 |
Statistics retrieved from Sports-Reference.

== Coaching career ==
Palmer took her first coaching position at Virginia Commonwealth University while playing in the WNBA. In 2007, she joined the staff at the University of Kentucky under coach Matthew Mitchell. She remained there until 2009.

In 2009, Palmer became an assistant coach at the University of Virginia under legendary coach Debbie Ryan.

In 2011, Palmer became the women's head coach at the University of North Carolina at Greensboro.
