= KTDF =

KTDF may refer to:

- KGSA-LD, a low-power television station (channel 23, virtual 16) licensed to serve San Antonio, Texas, United States, which held the call sign KTDF-LP from 2003 to 2016
- Person County Airport (ICAO code KTDF)
