= Dena Head =

American basketball player (born 1970)

Personal information
- Born: August 16, 1970 (age 55) Canton, Michigan, U.S.
- Listed height: 5 ft 10 in (1.78 m)

Career information
- High school: Plymouth-Salem (Canton, Michigan)
- College: Tennessee (1989–1992)
- WNBA draft: 1997: 1st round, 1st overall pick
- Drafted by: Utah Starzz
- Position: Guard

Career highlights
- 2× NCAA champion (1989, 1991); All-American – USBWA (1992); Kodak All-American (1992); SEC Player of the Year (1992); SEC Tournament MVP (1992); 2× First-team All-SEC (1991, 1992); SEC Freshman of the Year (1989); SEC All-Freshman Team (1989); Michigan Miss Basketball (1987)
- Stats at Basketball Reference
Medals
Women's basketball
Representing the United States
World University Games
Gold medal – first place	1991 Sheffield	Team competition
Jones Cup
Gold medal – first place	1992 Taipei	Team competition
FIBA World Championship for Women
Bronze medal – third place	1994 Sydney	Team competition

Dena Head (born August 16, 1970) is an American retired women's basketball player. She is best remembered as the first player drafted in the Women's National Basketball Association (WNBA).

== Early life ==
At Plymouth-Salem High School in Canton, Michigan, Head was named Miss Basketball of Michigan. She won two National Championships and was an All-American. Head played for coach Fred Thomann, a former Michigan State University standout.

== College career ==
Head attended the University of Tennessee and earned a degree in sports management. She played four years of basketball, winning the NCAA women's college basketball championship in 1989 and 1991. Head was named to the 1992 Kodak All-America Team. She was the Southeastern Conference Player of the Year as a senior, and was the 1989 SEC Freshman of the Year. As a senior, she was named to the Naismith All America Team, and in 1990 she was named to the NCAA All Regional Tournament Team East.

She later attended Baker College as a graduate student.

== USA Basketball ==
Head was named to the USA Basketball Women's Junior National Team (now called the U19 team). The team participated in the second Junior World Championship, held in Bilbao, Spain in July 1989. The USA team lost their opening game to South Korea in overtime, then lost a two-point game to Australia. After winning their next game against Bulgaria, the USA team again fell in a close game, losing by three points to Czechoslovakia. After beating Zaire in their next game, the USA team played Spain, and fell three points short. Head averaged 6.9 points per game over the course of the event. The USA team finished in seventh place.

Head played for the USA team, one of sixteen teams at the fifteenth World University Games (1991) held in Sheffield, England. The team was coached by Tara VanDerveer, and teammates included Lisa Leslie and Dawn Staley. The USA team won all eight games it played, earning the gold medal. Head averaged 6.8 points per game over the course of the event.

Head traveled to Taiwan with the team representing the US at the 1992 Women's R. William Jones Cup competition. Head scored 14 points in the opening game against Japan, which the USA team won. The team went on to win all eight games, and earned the gold medal for the event. The fourth game against Australia was a close match, with the Australians holding a slim lead at halftime, but the USA team came back, helped by Head's 18 points to win the game. Head averaged 11 points per game, and recorded 14 assists, second behind Dawn Staley.

Head was named to the USA national team and competed in the 1994 World Championships, held in June 1994 in Sydney, Australia. She competed along with college teammates Daedra Charles and Carla McGhee. The team was coached by Tara VanDerveer, and won their first six games, when they faced Brazil. In a closely contested, high scoring game, Brazil hit ten of ten free throws in the final minute to secure a 110–107 victory. The USA won a close final game against Australia 100–95 to earn the bronze medal.

== International career ==
Before the WNBA, Head played seven seasons of professional basketball in Brazil and in Europe for France, Spain, Italy, and Hungary.

== WNBA career ==
Head was the first and oldest player drafted in the WNBA. As part of the WNBA Elite draft in 1997, she was selected 1st overall by the Utah Starzz. Her debut game was played on June 21, 1997 in a 61 - 73 loss to the Sacramento Monarchs where she recorded 3 points, 1 rebound, 1 assist and 2 steals. In her first season, Head played in all but one of the Starzz regular season games and had season averages of 5.7 points, 2.3 rebounds and 1.7 assists. Her career-high in points was a 15-point performance against the Houston Comets on August 2, 1997. The Starzz finished with a league worst 7 - 21 and missed the playoffs.

For her second season, Head stayed with the Starzz and became a started for half of the season. She started in the team's first 8 games, and then 6 of the team's final 8 games (with starting Guard duties going to teammate Chantel Tremitiere in the middle of the season). Although Head played in more games and started in many more games than her rookie season, her minutes per game was lower (17.4 down to 15.6) and she had lower productivity amongst all of her statistics. Her points per game dropped to 3.6, rebounds dropped to 1.7 and assists dropped to 1.2 in her sophomore season as the Starzz finished with a 8 - 22 record.

On June 9, 1999 (one day before the 1999 season began), Head would be waived by the Starzz and she subsequently missed the entire season.

The Phoenix Mercury would be the next stop for Head as she signed with the team on June 19, 2000. This season saw Head see even less playing time and averaging even less numbers, only playing in 17 of the Mercury's remaining 24 season games at 8.8 minutes per game. These minutes resulted in her averaging 1.6 points, 1.1 rebounds and 0.9 assists. Fortunately, Head would finally reach the playoffs in her career as the Mercury finished 20 - 12 and matched up against the Los Angeles Sparks in the first round.

Head's final WNBA game was Game 2 of that 2000 Western Conference First Round series on August 13, 2000, against the Sparks. The Mercury would lose the game 76 - 101 and dropped the series to the Sparks 2 - 0. Head recorded 2 rebounds, 1 assist, 1 steal and 1 block in her final game

== Post WNBA career ==
Head served as women's basketball team assistant coach for the Central Connecticut State University.

Head now works for Amazon as a Manager.

== Career statistics ==
Legend
GP	Games played	GS	Games started	MPG	Minutes per game	RPG	Rebounds per game
APG	Assists per game	SPG	Steals per game	BPG	Blocks per game	PPG	Points per game
TO	Turnovers per game	FG%	Field-goal percentage	3P%	3-point field-goal percentage	FT%	Free-throw percentage
**Bold**	Career best	°	League leader

=== WNBA ===
==== Regular season ====
Year	Team	GP	GS	MPG	FG%	3P%	FT%	RPG	APG	SPG	BPG	TO	PPG
1997	Utah	27	4	**17.4**	39.0	31.3	**84.4**	**2.3**	**1.7**	0.5	**0.3**	2.3	**5.7**
1998	Utah	**30**	**14**	15.6	**42.4**	**48.1**	69.7	1.7	1.2	**1.0**	0.0	1.5	3.6
1999	Did not play (waived)												
2000	Phoenix	17	1	8.8	36.4	14.3	62.5	1.1	0.9	0.2	0.0	**0.6**	1.6
Career	3 years, 2 teams	74	19	14.7	39.9	36.4	75.5	1.8	1.3	0.6	0.1	1.6	3.9

==== Playoffs ====
Year	Team	GP	GS	MPG	FG%	3P%	FT%	RPG	APG	SPG	BPG	TO	PPG
2000	Phoenix	1	0	6.0	0.0	0.0	0.0	2.0	1.0	1.0	1.0	1.0	0.0
Career	1 year, 1 team	1	0	6.0	0.0	0.0	0.0	2.0	1.0	1.0	1.0	1.0	0.0

=== College ===
Year	Team	GP	GS	MPG	FG%	3P%	FT%	RPG	APG	SPG	BPG	TO	PPG
1988–89	Tennessee	**37**	-	-	43.9	0.0	**74.2**	3.0	3.0	1.1	0.2	-	6.4
1989–90	Tennessee	33	-	-	45.2	**100.0**	72.3	5.3	**3.9**	1.6	**0.3**	-	11.4
1990–91	Tennessee	35	-	-	**50.5**	49.0	71.3	**5.7**	3.7	1.7	**0.3**	-	13.1
1991–92	Tennessee	30	-	-	48.7	35.9	71.6	5.2	2.7	**2.0**	0.2	-	**13.7**
**Career**		135	-	-	47.4	43.0	72.2	4.8	3.3	1.6	0.3	-	11.0
Statistics retrieved from Sports-Reference.
