= Chantel Tremitiere =

American basketball player (born 1969)

Personal information
- Born: October 20, 1969 (age 57) Williamsport, Pennsylvania, U.S.
- Listed height: 5 ft 6 in (1.68 m)
- Listed weight: 142 lb (64 kg)

Career information
- High school: William Penn (York, Pennsylvania)
- College: Auburn (1987–1991)
- WNBA draft: 1997: 3rd round, 18th overall pick
- Drafted by: Sacramento Monarchs
- Position: Point guard
- Number: 3

Career history
- 1997: Sacramento Monarchs
- 1998–1999: Utah Starzz
- 2000: Indiana Fever
- Stats at Basketball Reference

Chantel Ruth Tremitiere (born October 20, 1969) is an American former professional women's basketball player.

Tremitiere played for Auburn in college and professionally in the Women's National Basketball Association (WNBA) from 1997 through 2001 with the Sacramento Monarchs, the Utah Starzz, and the Indiana Fever.

== Early life ==
Tremitiere was born in Williamsport, Pennsylvania. Her father is Arnold Kelly. She was then adopted into the family of William and Barbara Tremitiere as an infant and grew up in York, Pennsylvania. She has 14 brothers and sisters of differing ethnic backgrounds.

She grew up playing basketball with her siblings, stating that they needed another player to make two even teams. She averaged 30 points a game at Hannah Penn Middle School and was a basketball star when she transferred to William Penn High School. She graduated from high school in 1987 and chose to attend Auburn University, where she received a full basketball scholarship.

== Collegiate career ==
Tremitiere started every game for the Auburn Tigers women's basketball team in 1991 and averaged 4.1 points and 4.0 assists. In 1990, she was selected to the NCAA All-Tournament Team. During her tenure with Auburn, she was part of three straight SEC championships and trips to the Final Four. She played alongside Ruthie Bolton, Vickie Orr, and Carolyn Jones, among others. In her Auburn career, the team never lost a game at home.

She earned her bachelor's degree in Public Relations from Auburn, then was an assistant basketball coach for Auburn (1991–92); the University of Texas (1992–93), and the University of Massachusetts Amherst (1993–96). During this time, Chantel continued her hoop dreams overseas, playing for Lotos Gdynia in Poland, where her play caught the attention of professional scouts.

== Professional career ==
In the 1997 draft, after playing basketball in Europe, Tremitiere was selected as the 18th overall pick by the Sacramento Monarchs in the second year of the WNBA.

Her debut game was played on June 21, 1997, in a 73–61 win over the Utah Starzz where she recorded 7 points, 3 rebounds and 4 assists. In her rookie season, she had her most successful season in her career, averaging 7.6 points, 4.8 assists. She also led the WNBA with an average of 37.5 minutes per game and started every game she played. Playing for the Monarchs also gave Tremitiere the opportunity to be reunited with Ruthie Bolton, her teammate at Auburn.

After her rookie season, Tremitiere was traded to Utah on May 5, 1998, for Lady Grooms (Grooms would go on to play the remainder of her career (7 more seasons) with the Monarchs). She would play two seasons with Utah in 1998 and 1999. In her sophomore season she averaged 5.5 points and 3.6 assists. On June 21, 1999, a controversial decision to waive Tremitiere would be made by coach Frank Layden. Layden only coached the Starzz for two weeks before resigning for "personal reasons", but some Starzz players have voiced their contempt of Layden's coaching style and said he was "too harsh" on the players.

She was resigned by the Starzz on July 6 and finished the 1999 season with them. However, her productivity would drop in her third year with a drastic drop in minutes from the previous year (25.3 minutes per game to 9.6 minutes) along with averaging 1.1 points and 1.1 assists.

On December 15, 1999, she was acquired in the 2000 expansion draft and joined the newly formed Indiana Fever. She played one season for the Fever, suffering from an ankle injury most of the year which limited her to an average of 12.7 minutes, 2 points, and 2 assists per game.

Tremitiere announced her retirement from the WNBA on April 23, 2001, at the age of 31. The final game of her career was her last game of the 2000 season with the Fever. That game was played on August 9, 2000, in a 67–51 win over the Charlotte Sting where she recorded 3 points, 3 rebounds and 3 assists. Tremitiere ended her career never reaching the WNBA playoffs and never been on a team with a .500 or more record. For the four seasons she played, her team's record every year was Sacramento 10–18, Utah 8–22, Utah 15–17 and Indiana 9–23.

In 2002 she played professional basketball briefly again in Turkey and for the WABA team, the York City Noise.

== Post-WNBA activities ==
Tremitiere retired from basketball in 2002. She worked as an actor and a writer. Together with KLC, she produced the rap hit "Hoody Hoo" by TRU. She can be seen in the 2002 Walt Disney movie Double Teamed about WNBA players Heather and Heidi Burge, and has directed faith-based plays in her hometown of York. In 2005, she created her own graphic design and video company called Blank Mindz.

Tremitiere has held many charity basketball games, bringing businesses and celebrities together for the benefit of the community in Sacramento and York. Tremitiere continues to work with basketball players, including the 11th-grade Auburn Raptor Elite girls team, ten year olds, and players like Garrison Brooks.

Tremitiere is committed to community service, speaking for youth groups and volunteering to work with at-risk youth. She was a guest speaker at North American Council on Adoptable Children (NACAC)'s 2005 annual conference in Pittsburgh, Pennsylvania. Tremitiere also began a non-profit organization called Assist One, which broadcast the stories of children waiting to be adopted in the Sacramento, California, area. She wrote a book with her mother, published in 2018, titled "Those ANGELS Among Us: Parenting the Foster and Adopted Child." She has traveled as a motivational speaker.

In 2014, Tremitiere was diagnosed with thyroid cancer, and beat it.

Tremitiere returned to Auburn for graduate school and to serve as a graduate assistant under coach Terri Williams-Flournoy. She completed her MBA in 2015 and her PhD in 2017. She serves as a professor at Auburn in the business school.

In 2020, Tremitiere went viral for shooting a trick shot at Dick's Sporting Goods on TikTok. She features other trick shot videos on her account.

Tremitiere is a self-described "sneaker head" and had 92 pairs as of 2020. She enjoys running and biking.

== Career statistics ==
Legend
GP	Games played	GS	Games started	MPG	Minutes per game	RPG	Rebounds per game
APG	Assists per game	SPG	Steals per game	BPG	Blocks per game	PPG	Points per game
TO	Turnovers per game	FG%	Field-goal percentage	3P%	3-point field-goal percentage	FT%	Free-throw percentage
**Bold**	Career best	°	League leader

=== WNBA ===
==== Regular season ====
Year	Team	GP	GS	MPG	FG%	3P%	FT%	RPG	APG	SPG	BPG	TO	PPG
1997	Sacramento	**28**°	**28**°	**37.5**	.352	.189	.744	**4.1**	**4.8**	**1.9**	.0	4.4	**7.6**
1998	Utah	**28**	18	25.3	**.364**	.367	.759	2.2	3.6	.8	**.1**	1.5	5.5
1999	Utah	20	0	9.6	.310	.250	**1.000**	1.0	1.1	.3	.0	**.7**	1.1
2000	Indiana	25	3	12.7	.353	**.444**	.625	1.4	2.0	.4	.0	1.2	2.0
**Career**	4 years, 3 teams	101	49	22.9	.353	.301	.739	2.2	3.1	.9	.0	2.0	4.3

=== College ===
Year	Team	GP	Points	FG%	3P%	FT%	RPG	APG	SPG	BPG	PPG
1987-88	Auburn	29	34	26.3%	0.0%	63.6%	1.2	2.3	0.7	0.0	1.2
1988-89	Auburn	27	50	40.0%	0.0%	50.0%	1.7	1.6	0.6	0.0	1.9
1989-90	Auburn	**35**	167	40.8%	**60.0%**	62.0%	**3.1**	5.1	1.5	0.1	4.8
1990-91	Auburn	32	**257**	**45.5%**	20.0%	**72.0%**	3.0	**6.3**	**2.4**	**0.2**	**8.0**
**Career**		123	508	41.8%	36.3%	64.3%	2.3	4.0	1.3	0.1	4.1
