= LaNeishea Caufield =

American basketball player (born 1980)

La’Neishea Caufield
Personal information
- Born: May 25, 1980 (age 46) Stroud, Oklahoma, U.S.
- Listed height: 5 ft 9 in (1.75 m)
- Listed weight: 159 lb (72 kg)

Career information
- High school: Ada (Ada, Oklahoma)
- College: Oklahoma (1998–2002)
- WNBA draft: 2002: 1st round, 14th overall pick
- Drafted by: Utah Starzz
- Position: Guard
- Number: 20

Career history
- 2002: Utah Starzz

Career highlights
- Big 12 Freshman of the Year (1999)
- Stats at Basketball Reference

La’Neishea Caufield (born May 25, 1980) is an American former professional basketball player who played for the Utah Starzz of the Women's National Basketball Association (WNBA). She was named Big 12 Player of the Week in the 2001 season.

== WNBA ==
On April 19, 2002, Caufield was selected with the 14th pick of the 2002 WNBA draft by the Utah Starzz. The Starzz acquired this pick the day before on April 18 from the New York Liberty after trading Korie Hlede for a first round pick. Her debut game was played on May 25, 2002 in a 79 - 75 win over the Minnesota Lynx. In her debut, Caufield played for only 4 minutes and recorded 3 points and no other stats other than 1 turnover and 1 foul.

After playing in the Starzz' first 8 games from May 25 to June 15, Caufield had her status on the team changed to injured after a potential lower-left leg stress fracture. Unfortunately, due to this injury, Caufield never played in the WNBA again after June 15, leaving her career game total at only eight games. That final game on June 15, the Starzz defeated the Seattle Storm 61 - 54 with Caufield playing a little over 3 minutes and recording 2 rebounds and no other stats besides 2 turnovers and 2 fouls.

== Career statistics ==
Legend
GP	Games played	GS	Games started	MPG	Minutes per game	RPG	Rebounds per game
APG	Assists per game	SPG	Steals per game	BPG	Blocks per game	PPG	Points per game
TO	Turnovers per game	FG%	Field-goal percentage	3P%	3-point field-goal percentage	FT%	Free-throw percentage
**Bold**	Career best	°	League leader

=== WNBA ===
WNBA regular season statistics
Year	Team	GP	GS	MPG	FG%	3P%	FT%	RPG	APG	SPG	BPG	TO	PPG
2002	Utah	8	0	8.1	.400	.556	1.000	0.6	0.1	0.9	0.0	1.0	2.4
**Career**	1 year, 1 team	8	0	8.1	.400	.556	1.000	0.6	0.1	0.9	0.0	1.0	2.4

=== College ===
NCAA statistics
Year	Team	GP	GS	MPG	FG%	3P%	FT%	RPG	APG	SPG	BPG	TO	PPG
1998–99	Oklahoma	29			.482	.333	.806	**5.3**	2.5	2.6	0.1		15.8
1999–00	Oklahoma	33			**.502**	.302	.844	4.9	2.9	2.9	0.1		15.3
2000–01	Oklahoma	34			.468	.274	.839	4.3	**3.4**	**4.0**	0.1		15.8
2001–02	Oklahoma	**36**			.460	**.372**	**.868**	5.0	2.6	2.7	0.0		**17.4**
**Career**		132			.476	.322	.839	4.8	2.9	3.0	0.0		16.1
