= Kim Williams (basketball) =

American basketball player (born 1974)

Personal information
- Born: October 14, 1974 (age 52) Chicago, Illinois, U.S.
- Listed height: 5 ft 6 in (1.68 m)
- Listed weight: 136 lb (62 kg)

Career information
- High school: John Marshall (Chicago, Illinois)
- College: Arkansas–Fort Smith (1993–1995); DePaul (1995–1997)
- WNBA draft: 1997: 4th round, 28th overall pick
- Drafted by: Utah Starzz
- Playing career: 1997–2014
- Position: Guard

Career history
- 1997–1998: Utah Starzz
- 1998–1999: Sporting
- 1999–2000: Holon
- 2000–2001: Fiskobirlik
- 2004–2005: Chicago Blaze
- 2004–2006: Erdemirspor
- 2006–2007: Cukierki Odra Brzeg
- 2007–2008: Megas Alexandros
- 2008–2009: Paghiakos
- 2009–2011: Dnipro
- 2012–2014: Dynamo Kyiv

Career highlights
- Third-team All-American – AP (1997); CUSA Player of the Year (1997); First-team All-CUSA (1997); Illinois Miss Basketball (1993)
- Stats at Basketball Reference

Kimberly Williams (born October 14, 1974) is an American former professional basketball player who played two seasons for the Utah Starzz of the Women's National Basketball Association (WNBA).

== Early life and college career ==
Born and raised in South Side, Chicago, Williams graduated from Marshall High School in 1993 and was Illinois "Ms. Basketball" as a senior.

She helped guide the Westark Community College (now University of Arkansas-Fort Smith) to back-to-back appearances in the NJCAA Women's Basketball Championship. The team were national runners-up in 1994 and won the national championship in 1995, going 67–2 cumulatively in Williams' two seasons. She was the first women's basketball player from Arkansas-Fort Smith to be drafted in the WNBA.

Williams transferred to DePaul University, where she played from 1995 to 1997. As a senior at DePaul in 1996–97, Williams was Conference USA Player of the Year after scoring 25.1 points per game, second highest nationally, and leading C-USA in assists (5.6 apg) and steals (4.52 spg).

== Professional career ==
=== WNBA ===
Drafted in the fourth round (28th overall) by the Utah Starzz in the 1997 WNBA draft, Williams played her debut game on June 21, 1997 in a 61 - 73 loss to the Sacramento Monarchs and recorded 6 points, 3 rebounds and 1 steal. Williams played 58 games in her first two seasons (both with Utah), and averaged 7.8 points, 2.4 rebounds, and 1.8 assists.

After her sophomore season in 1998, Williams never played in the WNBA again, but she did sign multiple contracts amongst different teams from 1999-2002. On April 6, 1999, the Minnesota Lynx selected Williams third overall in the 1999 WNBA expansion draft, but Williams was waived two months later on June 8 and never played for the Lynx.

After not being signed by any team and missing the 2000 season entirely, she was signed by the Cleveland Rockers on April 30, 2001. However she was waived a week later on May 8 and went on to miss the entire 2001 season as well.

On April 30, 2002, Williams signed a contract with the Los Angeles Sparks but was waived two weeks later on May 13 before the season started. And once again, she was not signed by another team and missed the entire 2002 season. And thus, her final WNBA game ever was played on August 17, 1998 in a 64 - 75 loss to the Phoenix Mercury where she recorded 2 points, 3 rebounds, 1 assist and 1 steal on 11% FG shooting (1-11 FG).

=== Other leagues ===
Following the 1998 WNBA season, Williams played overseas, beginning with Sporting in Greece from 1998 to 1999, followed by Holon in Israel from 1999 to 2000 and Fiskobirlik in Turkey from 2000 to 2001.

In 2004, Williams returned to the United States with the Chicago Blaze of the National Women's Basketball League, playing two seasons.

Williams played in Europe and Israel from 2004 to 2014, most recently with Dynamo Kyiv from 2012 to 2014. Williams left Ukraine as military conflicts between Russia and Ukraine began.

Williams signed with the Chicago Lady Steam of the Women's American Basketball Association in 2014. She returned to DePaul University later that year to finish her bachelor's degree.

== Career statistics ==
Legend
GP	Games played	GS	Games started	MPG	Minutes per game	RPG	Rebounds per game
APG	Assists per game	SPG	Steals per game	BPG	Blocks per game	PPG	Points per game
TO	Turnovers per game	FG%	Field-goal percentage	3P%	3-point field-goal percentage	FT%	Free-throw percentage
**Bold**	Career best	°	League leader

=== WNBA ===
==== Regular season ====
Year	Team	GP	GS	MPG	FG%	3P%	FT%	RPG	APG	SPG	BPG	TO	PPG
1997	Utah	28	10	**21.7**	38.4	26.5	**77.4**	**2.9**	**2.1**	1.4	**0.3**	**2.0**	**8.1**
1998	Utah	**30**	10	18.1	**40.8**	**32.1**	73.5	1.9	1.5	1.4	0.2	2.2	7.6
Career	2 years, 1 team	58	20	19.8	39.6	29.0	75.5	2.4	1.8	1.4	0.2	2.1	7.8

=== College ===
Year	Team	GP	GS	MPG	FG%	3P%	FT%	RPG	APG	SPG	BPG	TO	PPG
1995–96	DePaul	27	-	-	**46.4**	**37.5**	**71.8**	3.3	**5.8**	3.8	0.1	-	17.6
1996–97	DePaul	**29**	-	-	41.1	34.9	70.0	**4.0**	5.6	**4.5**	**0.3**	-	**25.1**
**Career**		56	-	-	43.1	35.1	70.9	3.6	5.7	4.2	0.2	-	21.5
Statistics retrieved from Sports-Reference.

== Honors and awards ==
=== College ===
- 2x first team NJCAA All-American
- MVP of NCJAA national tournament as a sophomore
- Conference USA Player of the Year
- Third team Associated Press All-American
- Kodak/WBCA All-District honors
- First team All-Conference USA honors
- Second team All-Conference USA honors.
- University of Arkansas-Fort Smith Athletic Hall of Fame
- Lions Athletic Hall of Fame
