= Denise Taylor =

American basketball coach

Denise Taylor (born 1962 or 1963) is an American former college and WNBA basketball coach. After completing assistant coach positions through the 1980s and 1990s, Taylor began her head coaching career with American International College from 1991 to 1993. After coaching for Northeastern Illinois University from 1993 to 1997, Taylor became the first ever Utah Starzz head coach in the WNBA. After her WNBA position ended in 1998, Taylor returned to collegiate sports as the head coach for the Jackson State Lady Tigers basketball team in 2001. With the Lady Tigers until 2011, Taylor won the 2008 SWAC women's basketball tournament while amassing 153 wins and 143 losses.

== Early life and education ==
In the early 1960s, Taylor was born in Cleveland, Mississippi. For her post-secondary education, Taylor played basketball at Texas Southern University during the early 1980s and received degrees in healthcare.

== Career ==
Taylor began her coaching career as an assistant coach for TSU from 1986 to 1987 and Lamar University between 1987 and 1991. After moving to American International College in 1991, Taylor had 32 wins and 23 losses as their head coach before she was hired by Northeastern Illinois University in 1993. Taylor had 61 wins and 48 losses as the head coach for Northeastern Illinois before her position ended in 1997. In 1997, Taylor was selected to become the first Utah Starzz head coach in the WNBA. With the Starzz, Taylor had 13 wins and 34 losses before she was replaced by Frank Layden in 1998.

In 2001, Taylor returned to coaching when she was hired by Jackson State University to coach their women's basketball team. While with the Jackson State Lady Tigers basketball team, Taylor won the 2008 SWAC women's basketball tournament after winning the SWAC regular season championships in 2003, 2006 and 2007. Taylor amassed 153 wins and 143 losses with the Lady Tigers before she was fired in 2011.

== Head coaching record ==
Legend
Regular season	G	Games coached	W	Games won	L	Games lost	W–L %	Win–loss %
Playoffs	PG	Playoff games	PW	Playoff wins	PL	Playoff losses	PW–L %	Playoff win–loss %

Team	Year	G	W	L	W–L%	Finish	PG	PW	PL	PW–L%	Result
Utah	1997	28	7	21	.250	4th in Western	—	—	—	—	Missed playoffs
Utah	1998	19	6	13	.316	(replaced)	—	—	—	—	—
Career		47	13	34	.277		—	—	—	—	
