= 1998 Utah Starzz season =

- Head coach: Denise Taylor (fired Jul. 27, 6–13 record); Frank Layden (2–9 record)
- Arena: Delta Center

Results
- Record: 8–22 (.267)
- Place: 5th (Western)
- Playoff finish: Did not qualify

The 1998 WNBA season was the 2nd for the Utah Starzz. The team finished in last place in the West for the second consecutive season.

== Transactions ==
=== Washington Mystics expansion draft ===
The following player was selected in the Washington Mystics expansion draft from the Utah Starzz:

Player	Nationality	School/Team/Country
Deborah Carter	United States	Georgia

=== WNBA draft ===
Round	Pick	Player	Nationality	School/Team/Country
1	1	Margo Dydek	Poland	Pool Getafe (Spain)
2	11	Olympia Scott	United States	Stanford
3	21	LaTonya Johnson	United States	Memphis
4	31	Tricia Bader Binford	United States	Boise State

=== Transactions ===
Date	Transaction
February 18, 1998	Lost Deborah Carter to the Washington Mystics in the WNBA expansion draft
April 29, 1998	Drafted Margo Dydek, Olympia Scott, LaTonya Johnson and Tricia Bader Binford in the 1998 WNBA draft
May 5, 1998	Traded Lady Hardmon to the Sacramento Monarchs in exchange for Chantel Tremitiere
May 8, 1998	Traded Karen Booker to the Houston Comets in exchange for Fran Harris
June 10, 1998	Waived Greta Koss
July 27, 1998	Fired Denise Taylor as Head Coach
July 27, 1998	Hired Frank Layden as Head Coach
July 28, 1998	Waived Fran Harris

== Roster ==
1998 Utah Starzz roster
Players
Coaches

Pos.	No.	Nat.	Name	Height	Weight	DOB	From	Yrs
G	40	(United States)	Alexander, Erin	5' 7" (1.7m)	140 lb (64kg)	1975-04-25	UC Santa Barbara	R
G/F	34	(United States)	Bader Binford, Tricia	5' 4" (1.63m)	125 lb (57kg)	1973-02-26	Boise State	R
F	28	(Soviet Union)	Baranova, Elena	6' 5" (1.96m)	182 lb (83kg)	1972-01-28		1
C	12	(Polish People's Republic)	Dydek, Margo	7' 2" (2.18m)	223 lb (101kg)	1974-04-28		R
G/F	20	(United States)	Harris, Fran	6' 0" (1.83m)	153 lb (69kg)	1965-03-12	Texas	1
G	11	(United States)	Head, Dena	5' 10" (1.78m)	175 lb (79kg)	1970-08-16	Tennessee	1
F	24	(United States)	Johnson, LaTonya	6' 1" (1.85m)	150 lb (68kg)	1975-08-17	Memphis	R
F	14	(United States)	Palmer, Wendy	6' 2" (1.88m)	165 lb (75kg)	1974-08-12	Virginia	1
G	32	(United States)	Reiss, Tammi	5' 6" (1.68m)	129 lb (59kg)	1970-04-02	Virginia	1
C	0	(United States)	Scott, Olympia	6' 2" (1.88m)	175 lb (79kg)	1976-05-05	Stanford	R
G	3	(United States)	Tremitiere, Chantel	5' 6" (1.68m)	142 lb (64kg)	1969-10-20	Auburn	1
G	23	(United States)	Williams, Kim	5' 6" (1.68m)	136 lb (62kg)	1974-10-14	DePaul	1

Head coach
(United States) Frank Layden (Niagara)
Assistant coaches
(United States) Fred Williams

Legend

- (C) Team captain
- (DP) Unsigned draft pick
- (FA) Free agent
- (S) Suspended
- Injured

== Schedule ==
=== Regular season ===
1998 game log
Total: 8–22 (Home: 5–10; Road: 3–12)
June: 2–7 (Home: 2–3; Road: 0–4)

Game	Date	Team	Score	High points	High rebounds	High assists	Location Attendance	Record
1	June 11	Los Angeles	L 83–89	Elena Baranova (18)	Elena Baranova (14)	Tammi Reiss (6)	Delta Center	0–1
2	June 13	Washington	W 78–77	Baranova; Reiss (17)	Elena Baranova (11)	Kim Williams (5)	Delta Center	1–1
3	June 15	New York	W 71–60	Tammi Reiss (15)	Margo Dydek (13)	Fran Harris (3)	Delta Center	2–1
4	June 19	@ Washington	L 76–85	Olympia Scott (15)	Elena Baranova (10)	Elena Baranova (4)	MCI Center	2–2
5	June 21	@ New York	L 64–68	Margo Dydek (14)	Baranova; Head (6)	Baranova; Reiss (5)	Madison Square Garden	2–3
6	June 22	@ Cleveland	L 72–88	Margo Dydek (18)	Elena Baranova (6)	Dena Head (4)	Gund Arena	2–4
7	June 25	Charlotte	L 83–91	Margo Dydek (21)	Elena Baranova (13)	Elena Baranova (5)	Delta Center	2–5
8	June 26	@ Phoenix	L 63–96	Elena Baranova (12)	Elena Baranova (9)	Chantel Tremitiere (3)	America West Arena	2–6
9	June 30	Houston	L 73–75 (2OT)	Margo Dydek (27)	Elena Baranova (17)	Elena Baranova (6)	Delta Center	2–7

July : 5–7 (Home: 2–2; Road: 3–5)

Game	Date	Team	Score	High points	High rebounds	High assists	Location Attendance	Record
10	July 2	@ Los Angeles	W 58–57	Margo Dydek (15)	Margo Dydek (9)	Baranova; Tremitiere (6)	Great Western Forum	3–7
11	July 5	@ Sacramento	L 66–70	Elena Baranova (14)	Elena Baranova (10)	Tremitiere; Williams (4)	ARCO Arena	3–8
12	July 6	Sacramento	W 68–64	Elena Baranova (22)	Elena Baranova (13)	Chantel Tremitiere (5)	Delta Center	4–8
13	July 8	Charlotte	L 69–77	Wendy Palmer (30)	Wendy Palmer (8)	Bader Binford; Head (4)	Delta Center	4–9
14	July 11	@ Houston	L 68–95	Wendy Palmer (22)	Dydek; Palmer (10)	Chantel Tremitiere (5)	Compaq Center	4–10
15	July 13	Detroit	L 67–74	Wendy Palmer (19)	Wendy Palmer (9)	Chantel Tremitiere (3)	Delta Center	4–11
16	July 17	@ Detroit	L 67–79	Kim Williams (16)	Margo Dydek (11)	Chantel Tremitiere (3)	The Palace of Auburn Hills	4–12
17	July 19	@ Washington	W 99–88	Wendy Palmer (24)	Dydek; Palmer (9)	Chantel Tremitiere (6)	MCI Center	5–12
18	July 22	@ Charlotte	W 61–58	Kim Williams (15)	Margo Dydek (14)	Chantel Tremitiere (4)	Charlotte Coliseum	6–12
19	July 25	@ Cleveland	L 59–69	Wendy Palmer (23)	Wendy Palmer (11)	Chantel Tremitiere (7)	Gund Arena	6–13
20	July 27	Phoenix	W 90–80	LaTonya Johnson (15)	Margo Dydek (9)	Dydek; Scott (4)	Delta Center	7–13
21	July 30	@ Houston	L 65–88	Margo Dydek (17)	Margo Dydek (11)	Chantel Tremitiere (7)	Compaq Center	7–14

August : 1–8 (Home: 1–5; Road: 0–3)

Game	Date	Team	Score	High points	High rebounds	High assists	Location Attendance	Record
22	August 1	Los Angeles	L 65–73	Wendy Palmer (15)	Wendy Palmer (12)	Dydek; Tremitiere; Williams (3)	Delta Center	7–15
23	August 4	Houston	L 57–77	Margo Dydek (20)	Margo Dydek (10)	Dydek; Head; Reiss (3)	Delta Center	7–16
24	August 6	Cleveland	L 69–79	Wendy Palmer (26)	Margo Dydek (11)	Chantel Tremitiere (4)	Delta Center	7–17
25	August 8	@ Phoenix	L 62–68	Margo Dydek (19)	Wendy Palmer (8)	Chantel Tremitiere (4)	America West Arena	7–18
26	August 10	Detroit	L 73–77	Wendy Palmer (20)	Wendy Palmer (12)	Palmer; Tremitiere (4)	Delta Center	7–19
27	August 12	Sacramento	W 81–71	Wendy Palmer (31)	Wendy Palmer (11)	Elena Baranova (8)	Delta Center	8–19
28	August 14	@ Los Angeles	L 67–87	Wendy Palmer (23)	Elena Baranova (10)	Elena Baranova (5)	Great Western Forum	8–20
29	August 15	@ Sacramento	L 55–82	Elena Baranova (13)	Wendy Palmer (12)	Palmer; Williams (4)	ARCO Arena	8–21
30	August 17	Phoenix	L 64–75	Wendy Palmer (16)	Elena Baranova (11)	Elena Baranova (5)	Delta Center	8–22

1998 season schedule

=== Season standings ===
Western Conference	W	L	PCT	Conf.	GB
Houston Comets ^{x}	27	3	.900	15–1	–
Phoenix Mercury ^{x}	19	11	.633	10–6	8.0
Los Angeles Sparks ^{o}	12	18	.400	6–10	15.0
Sacramento Monarchs ^{o}	8	22	.267	5–11	19.0
Utah Starzz ^{o}	8	22	.267	4–12	19.0

== Statistics ==
Legend
GP	Games played	GS	Games started	MPG	Minutes per game	RPG	Rebounds per game
APG	Assists per game	SPG	Steals per game	BPG	Blocks per game	PPG	Points per game
FG%	Field-goal percentage	3P%	3-point field-goal percentage	FT%	Free-throw percentage	TO	Turnovers per game
PF	Fouls per game		Team leader		League leader

=== Regular season ===
Player	GP	GS	MPG	FG%	3P%	FT%	RPG	APG	SPG	BPG	PPG
Elena Baranova	20	19	33.6	.420	.313	.831	9.3	3.5	1.1	1.5	12.9
Margo Dydek	30	30	28.0	.482	.143	.732	7.6	1.8	0.5	3.8	12.9
Wendy Palmer	28	21	27.2	.472	.353	.653	6.6	1.1	0.6	0.2	13.5
Chantel Tremitiere	28	18	25.3	.364	.367	.759	2.2	3.6	0.8	0.1	5.5
Tammi Reiss	22	17	21.7	.403	.296	.655	1.8	2.2	0.5	0.0	6.5
Fran Harris	18	12	19.6	.354	.313	.833	2.2	1.7	0.7	0.1	3.9
Kim Williams	30	10	18.1	.408	.321	.735	1.9	1.5	1.4	0.2	7.6
LaTonya Johnson	28	8	17.5	.400	.286	.618	1.9	0.7	0.4	0.0	5.4
Olympia Scott	29	1	16.1	.430	.200	.569	2.9	0.8	0.8	0.3	5.3
Dena Head	30	14	15.6	.424	.481	.697	1.7	1.2	1.0	0.0	3.6
Tricia Bader Binford	22	0	9.4	.302	.370	.500	0.5	0.9	0.6	0.0	2.1
Erin Alexander	12	0	5.7	.227	.263	1.000	0.3	0.3	0.1	0.0	1.4

^{‡}Waived/Released during the season
^{†}Traded during the season
^{≠}Acquired during the season
