= LaTonya Johnson (basketball) =

American basketball player (born 1975)

Personal information
- Born: 17 August 1975 (age 51) Winchester, Tennessee
- Listed height: 6 ft 1 in (1.85 m)
- Listed weight: 152 lb (69 kg)

Career information
- High school: Franklin County (Winchester, Tennessee)
- College: Memphis (1994–1998)
- WNBA draft: 1998: 3rd round, 21st overall pick
- Drafted by: Utah Starzz
- Position: Forward
- Number: 24, 23

Career history
- 1998–2003: Utah Starzz/San Antonio Silver Stars
- 2004: Houston Comets

Career highlights
- 2x First-team All-CUSA (1996, 1998); CUSA Tournament MVP (1998)
- Stats at Basketball Reference

LaTonya Johnson (born 17 August 1975) is a former professional basketball player who played in the WNBA for seven seasons. She also played overseas in Israel and Bulgaria.

== College ==
Johnson played at Memphis from 1994 to 1998, where she was a four-year letterwinner. She left Memphis as its third all-time leading scorer (2,232), sixth all-time in rebounds (686), and all-time leader in three-point field goals made (207). During the four years, the team compiled an 86–34 record.

== Career statistics ==
=== WNBA ===
Legend
GP	Games played	GS	Games started	MPG	Minutes per game	RPG	Rebounds per game
APG	Assists per game	SPG	Steals per game	BPG	Blocks per game	PPG	Points per game
TO	Turnovers per game	FG%	Field-goal percentage	3P%	3-point field-goal percentage	FT%	Free-throw percentage
**Bold**	Career best	°	League leader

==== Regular season ====
Year	Team	GP	GS	MPG	FG%	3P%	FT%	RPG	APG	SPG	BPG	TO	PPG
1998	Utah	28	8	17.5	40.0	28.6	61.8	**1.9**	**0.7**	0.4	0.0	1.5	5.4
1999	Utah	**31**	**18**	**23.2**	36.5	29.3	**81.0**	1.7	**1.6**	0.7	**0.3**	1.3	**6.5**
2000	Utah	29	6	16.6	**40.3**	**33.3**	65.1	1.8	0.9	0.4	0.1	1.2	5.0
2001	Utah	26	0	8.8	26.2	16.7	78.6	0.7	0.3	0.1	0.0	0.5	1.9
2002	Utah	28	1	9.6	32.9	31.3	75.0	0.7	0.4	0.3	0.1	0.5	2.7
2003	San Antonio	**31**	1	9.0	25.4	26.1	72.7	0.8	0.3	0.1	0.0	0.5	1.9
2004	Houston	6	0	6.0	28.6	**33.3**	0.0	0.2	0.2	0.3	0.0	**0.3**	1.0
Career	7 years, 2 teams	179	34	14.0	35.3	28.3	71.5	1.3	0.7	0.3	0.1	0.9	3.8

==== Playoffs ====
Year	Team	GP	GS	MPG	FG%	3P%	FT%	RPG	APG	SPG	BPG	TO	PPG
2001	Utah	2	0	7.5	25.0	0.0	**100.0**	0.5	0.0	0.0	**0.5**	1.5	2.0
2002	Utah	**5**	0	**8.0**	**50.0**	**22.2**	50.0	**0.8**	**0.4**	0.0	0.0	**0.2**	**3.4**
Career	2 years, 1 team	7	0	7.9	44.4	16.7	75.0	0.7	0.3	0.0	0.1	0.6	3.0

=== College ===
Year	Team	GP	GS	MPG	FG%	3P%	FT%	RPG	APG	SPG	BPG	TO	PPG
1994–95	Memphis	**30**	-	-	49.6	40.2	70.3	6.1	1.4	2.4	**0.2**	-	17.6
1995–96	Memphis	29	-	-	**50.2**	**42.1**	75.2	**6.5**	1.0	1.9	**0.2**	-	20.7
1996–97	Memphis	29	-	-	44.7	34.6	69.6	4.9	1.2	1.7	0.1	-	15.3
1997–98	Memphis	**30**	-	-	48.0	40.5	**78.8**	5.7	**2.0**	**2.5**	**0.2**	-	**21.9**
**Career**		118	-	-	48.3	39.4	74.5	5.8	1.4	2.1	0.2	-	18.9
Statistics retrieved from Sports-Reference.

== Honors and awards ==
=== College ===
- Conference USA Tournament MVP as a senior (1998)
- Conference USA First Team member (1996 and 1998)
- Second team honoree (1997)
- 3x C-USA Player of the Week
- Great Midwest Conference Newcomer of the Year (1995)
- First team all-Great Midwest Conference (as a freshman)
- Basketball Times All-American Honorable Mention (1996 and 1998)
- USA Today Freshman of Influence (1994–95), one of just two Lady Tigers to ever earn that honor.
