= Lady Grooms =

American basketball player (born 1970)

Personal information
- Born: September 12, 1970 (age 56) Raleigh, North Carolina, U.S.
- Listed height: 5 ft 10 in (1.78 m)
- Listed weight: 160 lb (73 kg)

Career information
- College: Georgia (1989–1992)
- WNBA draft: 1997: Initial allocation round
- Drafted by: Utah Starzz
- Playing career: 1997–2004
- Position: Guard
- Number: 27

Career history
- 1997: Utah Starzz
- 1998–2004: Sacramento Monarchs

Career highlights
- 2× First-team All-SEC (1990, 1992); SEC All-Freshman team (1989)
- Stats at Basketball Reference

Lady Grooms (born September 12, 1970) is an American former professional basketball player, who was one of the 16 original WNBA players allocated to the teams in the new league's Initial Player Allocation draft (as Lady Hardmon). After a college career at the University of Georgia, she played 8 WNBA seasons and had career averages of 4.6 points and 2.1 rebounds per game, scoring over 1,000 career points and 500 career rebounds.

== WNBA career ==
Grooms was selected in the initial player allocation of the 1997 WNBA draft by the Utah Starzz on January 22, 1997. Her debut game was played on June 21, 1997, in a 61–73 loss to the Sacramento Monarchs where she recorded 6 points, 6 assists and 4 rebounds. Grooms would only play for the Starzz for one season, playing in 28 games and averaging 5.5 points, 3.0 rebounds and 2.4 assists.

On May 5, 1998, Grooms was traded to the Monarchs for Chantel Tremitiere and she would play for the Monarchs for the remainder of her career. For the Monarchs, Grooms played 217 games and averaged 4.6 points, 2.1 rebounds and 1.2 assists.

Her final WNBA game ever was Game 1 of the 2004 Western Conference First Round on September 24, 2004, in a 72–52 win over the Los Angeles Sparks. Grooms played for 3 minutes and recorded no stats in that game. She would also not play for the remainder of the playoffs, and the Monarchs would get eliminated in the Western Conference Finals 2 - 1 by the Seattle Storm.

Grooms is currently the director of basketball operations, director of diversity and head coach of the varsity girls' basketball team at the Sharpsburg Campus of Trinity Christian School in Georgia. She was formerly the director of basketball operations and the head girls basketball coach at Landmark Christian School in Fairburn, Georgia. Grooms was also the former head coach of the girls basketball team at Greater Atlanta Christian in Norcross, Georgia and she previously coached the varsity girls basketball team at Arlington Christian School in Fairburn, Georgia. In her first two seasons coaching the team, it won the state title each year in the GISA.

== Career statistics ==
Legend
GP	Games played	GS	Games started	MPG	Minutes per game	RPG	Rebounds per game
APG	Assists per game	SPG	Steals per game	BPG	Blocks per game	PPG	Points per game
TO	Turnovers per game	FG%	Field-goal percentage	3P%	3-point field-goal percentage	FT%	Free-throw percentage
**Bold**	Career best	°	League leader

=== College ===
Year	Team	GP	Points	FG%	FT%	RPG	APG	SPG	BPG	PPG
89	Georgia	30	214	48.5%	63.4%	4.0	1.5	0.8	**0.2**	7.1
90	Georgia	29	410	**49.8%**	**69.7%**	**5.7**	3.9	2.0	0.1	14.1
91	Georgia	**32**	**413**	46.8%	64.7%	4.4	3.0	1.9	0.0	**12.9**
92	Georgia	30	361	43.1%	63.6%	3.8	**6.0**	**2.0**	**0.2**	12.0
Career	Georgia	121	1397	46.9%	65.6%	4.4	3.6	1.7	0.1	11.5

=== WNBA ===
==== Regular season ====
Year	Team	GP	GS	MPG	FG%	3P%	FT%	RPG	APG	SPG	BPG	TO	PPG
1997	Utah	28°	24	24.7	.347	.100	.655	3.0	**2.4**	**.8**	.1	2.8	5.5
1998	Sacramento	30°	**29**	26.4	**.487**	**.167**	.670	2.7	1.6	.7	.1	1.7	**7.1**
1999	Sacramento	32°	1	14.1	.357	.000	.698	1.7	1.2	.3	.1	1.1	3.1
2000	Sacramento	30	3	13.4	.443	.000	.754	1.5	.4	.3	.1	.7	4.1
2001	Sacramento	31	0	17.5	.430	–	.741	2.5	1.2	.5	**.3**	.8	4.5
2002	Sacramento	32°	26	**26.6**	.431	.000	.855	**3.1**	1.2	.7	**.3**	1.4	**7.1**
2003	Sacramento	**34**°	9	13.8	.402	.000	.808	1.4	.9	.5	.1	.6	3.3
2004	Sacramento	28	0	8.4	.288	–	**.917**	.6	.4	.3	.1	**.1**	**1.8**
Career	8 years, 2 teams	245	92	18.1	.409	.095	.741	2.1	1.2	.5	.1	1.1	4.6

==== Playoffs ====
Year	Team	GP	GS	MPG	FG%	3P%	FT%	RPG	APG	SPG	BPG	TO	PPG
1999	Sacramento	1	0	**25.0**	.429	–	–	**5.0**	**1.0**	**1.0**	.0	2.0	**6.0**
2000	Sacramento	2	0	11.5	.500	–	**1.000**	1.0	.0	.0	.0	.5	1.5
2001	Sacramento	5	0	6.2	.286	–	.833	.8	.2	.0	.0	.6	1.8
2003	Sacramento	**6**	0	10.8	**.583**	–	.500	.8	.5	.2	.0	.2	1.5
2004	Sacramento	1	0	3.0	.000	–	–	.0	.0	.0	.0	**.0**	.0
Career	5 years, 1 team	15	0	9.8	.448	–	.778	1.1	.3	.1	.0	.5	2.2
