= Elena Baranova =

Russian basketball player (born 1972)

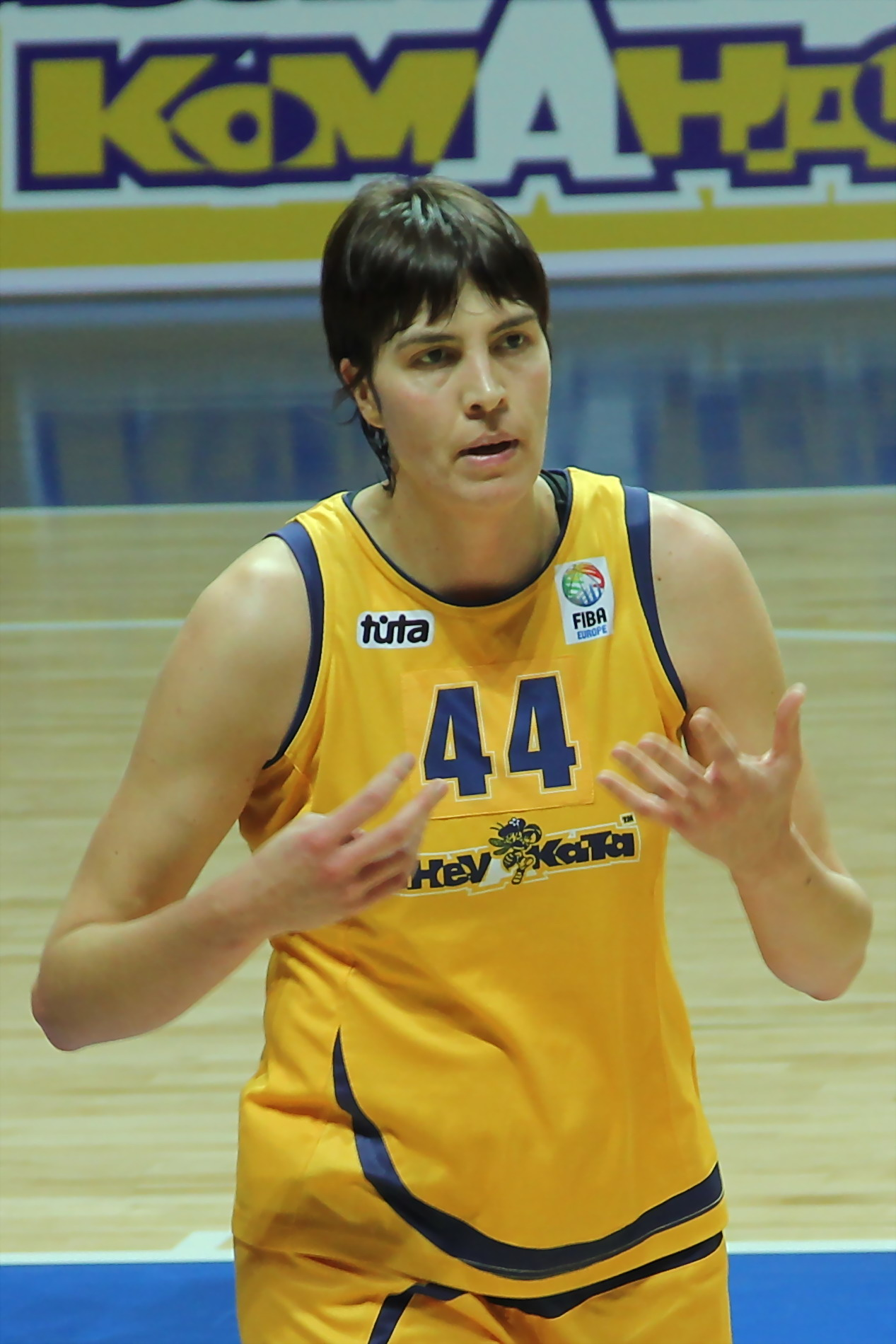
- Baranova in 2012

Personal information
- Born: 28 January 1972 (age 54) Frunze, Kirghiz SSR, Soviet Union
- Listed height: 6 ft 4 in (1.93 m)
- Listed weight: 182 lb (83 kg)

Career information
- Playing career: 1997–2005
- Position: Forward
- Number: 28

Career history
- 1997–1999: Utah Starzz
- 2001: Miami Sol
- 2003–2005: New York Liberty

Career highlights
- WNBA All-Star (2001); WNBA blocks leader (1997)
- Stats at WNBA.com
- Stats at Basketball Reference
Medals
Representing the Soviet Union
Gold medal – first place	1991 France	Team
European Championships
Representing the Unified Team
Gold medal – first place	1992 Barcelona	CIS team
Representing Russia
Bronze medal – third place	2004 Athens	National team
World Championships
Silver medal – second place	1998 Germany	Team
Silver medal – second place	2002 China	Team
European Championships
Bronze medal – third place	1995 France	Team
Bronze medal – third place	1999 France	Team
Silver medal – second place	2001 France	Team
Gold medal – first place	2003 Greece	Team

Elena Viktorovna Baranova (Russian: Елена Викторовна Баранова; born 28 January 1972) is a Russian former professional basketball player. She is a former Women's National Basketball Association (WNBA) player, where she became the first player from Europe in 1997 WNBA inaugural season, the first All-Star from Russia in 2001 and played for the New York Liberty until the 2005 season.

== Career ==
Baranova was born in the Kirghiz Soviet Socialist Republic. She started playing professional basketball at age 16, was included to the Soviet national team at the age of 17, won European Championship at the age of 19 in 1991, and became the Olympic champion at the age of 20 in 1992.

=== WNBA ===
Baranova was assigned to the Utah Starzz on 22 January 1997 during the initial player allocation of the 1997 WNBA draft. Her debut game was played on 21 June 1997 in a 61 - 73 loss to the Sacramento Monarchs where she recorded 7 points, 7 rebounds and a tremendous 5 blocks. In her first WNBA season she led the League in blocked shots (2.25 blocks per game) and set the League's single-game record for three-point field goals with 7 of 9 on 22 July 1997 at Madison Square Garden, New York. Baranova would miss the playoffs for her first three seasons with the Starzz. The team finished 7 - 21 in 1997, 8 - 22 in 1998 and 15 - 17 in 1999. In her three seasons with the Starzz, Baranova played 77 games (starting in 65 of them) and averaged 10 points, 6.4 rebounds and 2.3 assists.

On 15 December 1999 she was traded with Utah's second-round pick in the 2000 WNBA draft to the Miami Sol (the pick would become Jameka Jones) in exchange for Kate Starbird and the 8th pick in the 2000 WNBA Draft (which turned into Tamicha Jackson). Due to an anterior cruciate ligament injury, Baranova would sit out the entire 2000 season. She would return to play in the 2001 WNBA season, still signed to the Sol, and she was awarded 'The Bud Light Shooting Champion' trophy as the League's top free-throw shooter (with 93.1%). The same 2001 season she was selected to play in WNBA All-Star Game in Orlando to become the only player from Russia to represent her country at the All-Star Weekend, where she set WNBA All-Star Game record for blocked shots (4). Helping the Sol to a 20 - 12 regular season record, Baranova reached the playoffs for the first time in here career, but the Sol unfortunately lost to the New York Liberty in the Semi-Finals.

After also missing the 2002 season, she was taken in the 2003 WNBA dispersal draft by the New York Liberty on 24 April 2003. She stayed with the Liberty for 3 seasons, averaging 9.6 points and 6.5 rebounds in 100 games for the team. The Liberty made the playoffs in 2004 and 2005 and lost in the Eastern Conference Finals and Semi-Finals respectively.

Also known as 'Russian Queen' and 'SuperNova', Baranova is one of just 2 players in WNBA All-Time History to record over 200 three-point field goals (with 236) and 300 blocks (with 320). Although she performed just in 7 seasons, she is 7th in blocks (320), 7th in blocks per game (1.53), 12th in 3-point field goal percentage (39.1%), 14th in rebounds per game (6.4), 17th in free-throw percentage (84.5%).

Baranova's final WNBA game ever was Game 2 of the 2005 Eastern Conference First Round on 1 September 2005. Baranova had a very disappointing game, playing 27 minutes and recording 2 points on 1 - 5 FGs shooting (20% FG) and committed 3 fouls. The Liberty would lose 50 - 58 to the Indiana Fever and be eliminated from the playoffs.

=== International ===
Baranova's scoring and rebounding ability helped the Soviet national team to win gold medals at the 1991 European Championship and 1992 Olympics. She has played in 105 games for her National team (which is Russia all-time record for men and women), in which she scored over 1300 points representing her country at three Olympic Games (1992, 1996, 2004), two World championships (1998, 2002) and seven European Championships (1991, 1993, 1995, 1997, 1999, 2001, 2003). At last 3 events she appeared as the captain of Russian national team (2002 World championship, 2003 European championship, 2004 Olympic Games).

At 1998 World championship where Elena led Russia to silver medals she was awarded by MVP (Most Valuable Player) prize and in 2002 World championship (where she also brought Russians to become the vice-champions) Elena Baranova was selected to the World's Top 5 Team.

1991 European Champion as a member of USSR team (the last competition where USSR team took part), Elena led her country to the first Russian Gold medals in basketball at 2003 European Championship, where she also was selected to Europe 'Top 5 Team'.

=== Achievements ===
Europe: 22 seasons, over 650 games, over 12,000 points, over 6,000 rebounds
Stroitel Frounze (USSR, 1988–1989), Dynamo Moscow (USSR, 1989–1992), Elitzur Holon (Israel, 1992–1994), CSKA Moscow (Russia, 1994–1999), Bison Mytischi (Russia, 1999), Fenerbahçe Istanbul (Turkey, 1999–2000), Villa Pini Chieti (Italy, 2000–2001), UMMC Ekaterinburg (Russia, 2001–2003), Dynamo Moscow (Russia, 2004–2005), Chevakata Vologda (Russia, 2006–2007), Ros Casares Valencia (Spain, 2007–2008), UMMC Ekaterinburg (Russia, 2008–2009), Nadezhda Orenburg (Russia, 2009–2011), Chevakata Vologda (Russia, 2011–2012).

WNBA: 7 seasons, 220 games (178 started), 2,215 points, 1,403 rebounds
Utah Starzz (1997, 1998, 1999), Miami Sol (2001), New York Liberty (2003, 2004, 2005).

Other achievements

- 1997 Ronchetti Cup Champion (with CSKA Moscow).
- 1998 European Player of The Year.
- In 1999 Baranova played four men's basketball games for Bison Mytischi in the Moscow Oblast championships. She averaged 6.3 points, 6.25 rebounds and 2.75 blocks. By the end of the same 1999 year was selected as 'The Best Russian Basketball Player of 20th century' voted by the most popular Russian newspaper 'Sport-Express' readers.
- 2003 EuroLeague Women Champion (with UMMC Ekaterinburg) and Final Four MVP.
- 2010 FIBA Cup Finalist (with Nadezhda Orenburg).
- 6-times Champion of Russia (the only in Russian Women's Basketball) and Russian Cup winner, 2-times Champion of Israel and Israel Cup winner, Vice-Champion of Turkey and Turkish Cup winner, Champion of Spain and Spanish Cup and SuperCup winner.

== Career statistics ==
=== WNBA ===
==== Regular season ====
Year	Team	GP	GS	MPG	FG%	3P%	FT%	RPG	APG	SPG	BPG	TO	PPG
1997	Utah	28°	27	32.6	.390	.377	.694	7.4	2.2	1.5	2.3	2.9	12.2
1998	Utah	20	19	33.6	.420	.313	.831	9.3	3.5	1.1	1.5	2.8	12.9
1999	Utah	29	19	19.7	.405	.417	.805	3.4	1.6	.7	.8	1.5	6.0
2001	Miami	32°	30	30.8	.427	.375	.930°	6.0	2.0	1.0	1.8	1.9	11.8
2003	New York	33	7	25.8	.416	.363	.886	5.5	1.9	1.1	1.3	1.9	8.4
2004	New York	34°	33	30.8	.463	.461	.925	7.2	2.0	1.1	1.7	2.4	11.6
2005	New York	33	33	28.9	.441	.388	.855	6.9	1.8	.8	1.4	1.8	8.7
Career	7 years, 3 teams	209	168	28.7	.424	.391	.845	6.4	2.1	1.0	1.5	2.1	10.1

==== Playoffs ====
Year	Team	GP	GS	MPG	FG%	3P%	FT%	RPG	APG	SPG	BPG	TO	PPG
2001	Miami	3	3	35.0	.455	.545	.727	6.0	2.3	.7	.7	3.0	14.7
2004	New York	5	5	30.8	.395	.308	.800	6.8	2.0	.8	1.8	2.4	8.4
2005	New York	2	2	29.5	.300	.333	1.000	4.0	1.0	1.5	1.0	.5	4.5
Career	3 years, 2 teams	10	10	31.8	.407	.407	.783	6.0	1.9	.9	1.3	2.2	9.5
