= Danielle Crockrom =

American basketball player (born 1981)

Personal information
- Born: February 11, 1981 (age 45) Houston, Texas, U.S.
- Listed height: 6 ft 1 in (1.85 m)

Career information
- High school: North Shore (Houston, Texas)
- College: Baylor (1998–2002)
- WNBA draft: 2002: 1st round, 11th overall pick
- Drafted by: Utah Starzz
- Position: Forward

Career history
- 2002: Utah Starzz

Career highlights
- 2× First-team All-Big 12 (2001, 2002)
- Stats at Basketball Reference

Danielle Antoinette Crockrom (born February 11, 1981) is an American former professional women's basketball player for the WNBA. She was the eleventh pick in the 2002 WNBA draft. She played forward for the Utah Starzz.

== Career statistics ==
Legend
GP	Games played	GS	Games started	MPG	Minutes per game	RPG	Rebounds per game
APG	Assists per game	SPG	Steals per game	BPG	Blocks per game	PPG	Points per game
TO	Turnovers per game	FG%	Field-goal percentage	3P%	3-point field-goal percentage	FT%	Free-throw percentage
**Bold**	Career best	°	League leader

=== WNBA ===
==== Regular season ====
WNBA regular season statistics
Year	Team	GP	GS	MPG	FG%	3P%	FT%	RPG	APG	SPG	BPG	TO	PPG
2002	Utah	18	0	4.7	35.7	0.0	75.0	0.7	0.1	0.0	0.1	0.2	1.6
**Career**	1 year, 1 team	18	0	4.7	35.7	0.0	75.0	0.7	0.1	0.0	0.1	0.2	1.6

==== Playoffs ====
WNBA playoff statistics
Year	Team	GP	GS	MPG	FG%	3P%	FT%	RPG	APG	SPG	BPG	TO	PPG
2002	Utah	1	0	2.0	50.0	0.0	0.0	0.0	0.0	0.0	0.0	0.0	2.0
**Career**	1 year, 1 team	1	0	2.0	50.0	0.0	0.0	0.0	0.0	0.0	0.0	0.0	2.0

=== College ===
NCAA statistics
Year	Team	GP	Points	FG%	3P%	FT%	RPG	APG	SPG	BPG	PPG
1998–99	Baylor	31	281	52.2	–	0.7	5.5	0.2	0.9	0.5	9.1
1999-00	Baylor	25	301	46.5	–	71.0	7.2	0.5	1.5	0.8	12.0
2000–01	Baylor	30	**637**	**57.1**	–	**74.3**	**11.6**	0.5	**1.9**	0.4	**21.2**
2001–02	Baylor	**33**	584	51.2	–	71.1	9.1	**1.1**	1.3	**1.0**	17.7
**Career**		119	1803	52.3	–	71.1	8.4	0.6	1.4	0.7	15.2
