= Timberlake, North Carolina =

Timberlake
- Unincorporated community
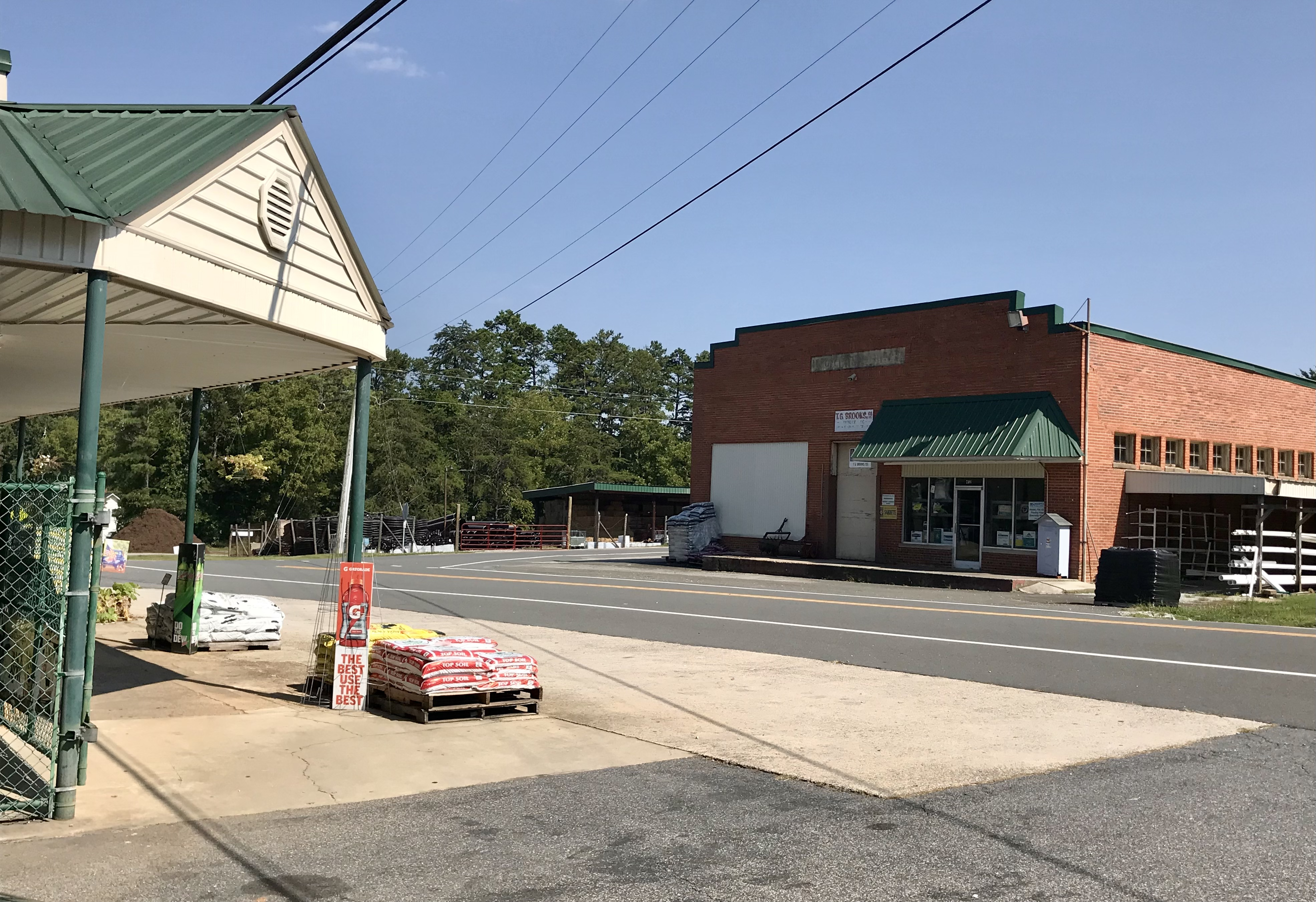
- Helena Moriah Road

- Location within the state of North Carolina
- Coordinates: 36°17′11″N 78°57′03″W
- Country: United States
- State: North Carolina
- County: Person
- Time zone: UTC-5 (Eastern (EST))
  - Summer (DST): UTC-4 (EDT)
- ZIP codes: 27583

Timberlake is an unincorporated community in south-central Person County, North Carolina, United States. The population was 6,921 at the 2010 census. It lies between Roxboro and Durham along the US Highway 501 corridor through Person County. The economy of this community is dominated by tobacco agriculture and manufacturing.

== History ==
Timberlake was one of several communities affected by a 2010 tornado outbreak.

== Culture ==
Although Timberlake has a fairly large population for an unincorporated municipality, it does not have a large number of businesses. The majority of residents work and do business in the nearby municipalities of Roxboro, Durham and Hillsborough.

== Demographics ==
According to the 2010 U.S. Census, there were 6,921 people in 2,684 households. The racial composition of the town was 82.9% White, 13.7% Black or African American, 0.5% Native American, 0.3% Asian, 0.1% Vietnamese, 1.1% some other race, and 1.5% of two or more races. 2.2% of the population were Hispanic or Latino of any race. Out of the population it only has a 5.5% unemployment rate.

== Notable people ==
- Wendy Palmer - UNCG Women's Basketball Head Coach
- John Dee Holeman - American Blues Artist
- Mary Jayne Harrelson - two time NCAA national track champion, six time All-American

== Points of interest ==
- Person County Airport

== Education ==
- Helena Elementary School
