= Tammi Reiss =

American basketball coach

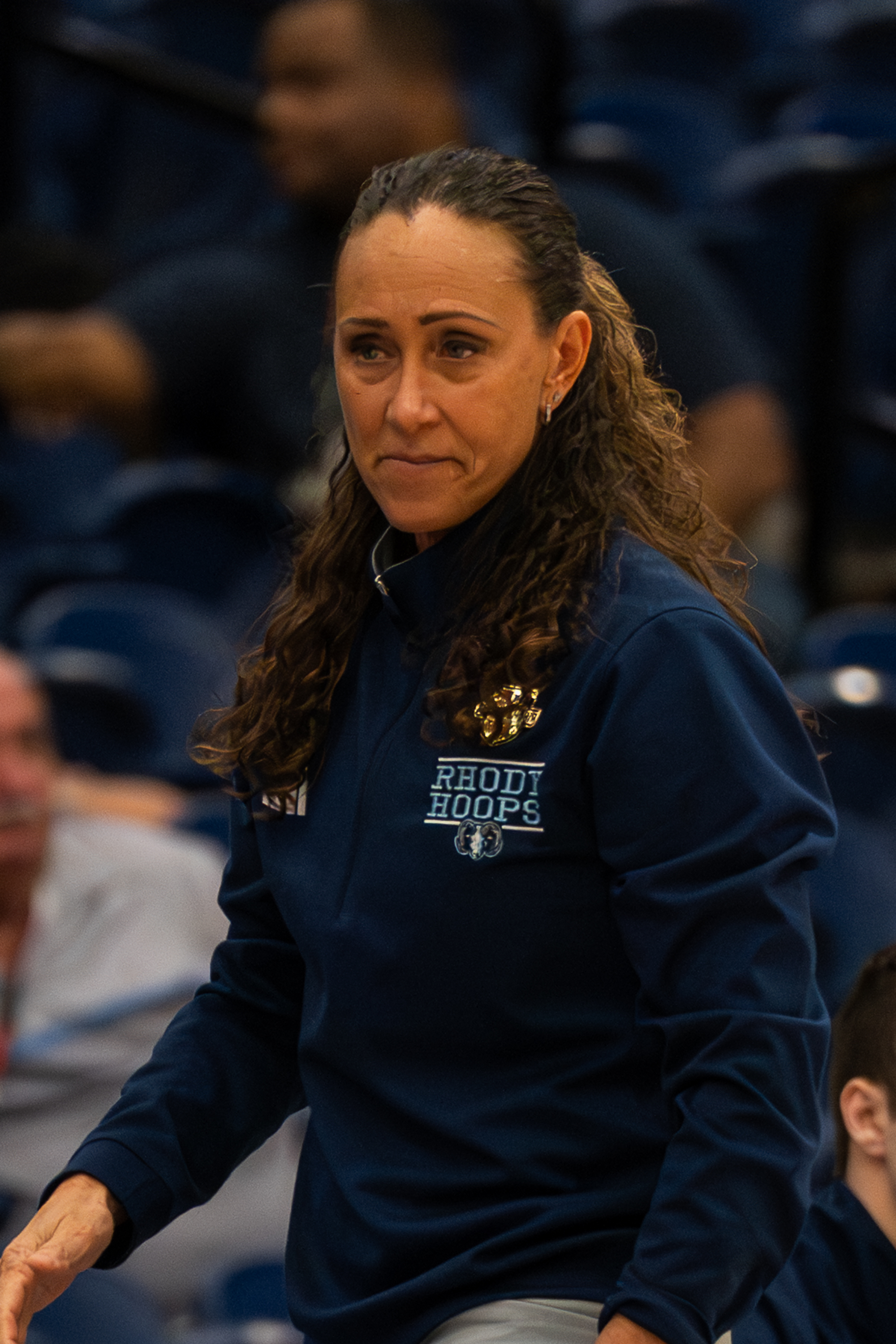
- Reiss with Rhode Island in 2026 at the A10 Women's Basketball Championship Tournament

Current position
- Title: Head coach
- Team: Florida
- Conference: SEC
- Record: 0–0 (–)

Biographical details
- Born: April 2, 1970 (age 56)
- Height: 5 ft 6 in (168 cm)

Playing career
- 1989–1992: Virginia
- 1997–1998: Utah Starzz

Coaching career (HC unless noted)
- 1993–1996: Virginia (assistant)
- 2001–2002: Utah Starzz (assistant)
- 2003: San Antonio Stars (assistant)
- 2011–2013: San Diego State (assistant)
- 2013–2015: Cal State Fullerton (AHC)
- 2015–2019: Syracuse (assistant)
- 2019–2026: Rhode Island
- 2026–present: Florida

Head coaching record
- Overall: 138–73 (.654)

Accomplishments and honors

Championships
- 2 Atlantic 10 regular season (2023, 2026); Atlantic 10 tournament (2026)

Awards
- 3× Atlantic 10 Coach of the Year (2021, 2023, 2026); Kodak All-American (1992); Miss New York Basketball (1988)

Tammi Reiss (born April 2, 1970) is an American college basketball coach, actress and former professional basketball player. She is the head coach of Florida women's basketball. Reiss is a native of New York state. Reiss played for the Virginia Cavaliers and graduated in 1992 with a degree in sports management. As a professional, she was chosen in the first round of the first-ever WNBA draft and played for two years with the Utah Starzz. She is formerly the head coach of the University of Rhode Island Lady Rams basketball team.

== Biography ==
Reiss was born in New York, and she attended Eldred Central School, a high school in Highland, Sullivan County, New York, in the Catskills region. Reiss began playing on her high school's team as an eighth grader. She led Eldred Central to a state championship in 1988, and finished her high school basketball career with 2,871 points scored. That total places her, as of 2014, in fifth place among New York state's all-time high school girls' scoring leaders. At Eldred Central, Reiss was coached by Ken Bjorn and Frank Kean, with boys' team coach Paul Tylawsky, a former basketball player with a Boston Celtics affiliate, also training her three times a week.

Reiss became a fan of Magic Johnson, and her dad built her a home basketball court during this period, so that she could hone her skills in a safe environment.

At Eldred, Reiss established a single-game New York state girls' basketball record by scoring 51 points in one contest.

Reiss was also an accomplished runner during this period, her achievements in Track and Field including winning the state's Class D cross country championship in 1983.

== University of Virginia ==
Reiss received an athletic scholarship to the University of Virginia and played from 1989 to 1992. There, she teamed up with Dawn Staley and twins Heidi and Heather Burge. She was coached by Debbie Ryan. At the University of Virginia, Reiss became a three-time all American.

During her stellar college career, she was a four time all league honoree, leading her team to the NCAA Final Four three straight times while being named to the ACC women's championship all tournament squad twice, scoring 1,842 points and making 437 free throws (in both cases, placing in second place all time among women in the school's history) and scoring 139 three-point shots while making 41% of her shots from the three-point line, both of the latter all time school records for women's basketball.

Reiss got interested in acting during her stint at the University of Virginia, and she took a Drama 101 class there.

== After college and the WNBA ==
Frustrated at the lack of a women's professional basketball league in the United States, Reiss returned to her college as an assistant coach. After two years, however, the WNBA had formed and on April 28, 1997, Reiss was drafted with the 5th overall pick by the Utah Starzz.

Reiss had been scouted by the Starzz after she received a telephone call from WNBA president Val Ackerman, who invited her to attend a veteran tryout camp where WNBA teams would observe prospect players. The Starzz were impressed by her play.

Reiss' debut WNBA game was played on June 21, 1997 in a 73-61 loss to the Sacramento Monarchs where she recorded 16 points, 7 rebounds and 2 assists (also having the most playing time of all of the players from both teams with 38 minutes and 56 seconds). She would sustain a sprained ankle injury on July 6, 1998, and although she recovered quickly, would get reinjured on July 11 and miss 5 games. The following year, she was waived by the Starzz on June 9, 1999 as part of the final roster cuts before the 1999 season.

Reiss played 50 games in her WNBA career, all 50 of them for the Starzz and had career averages of 7.2 points, 2.7 assists and 2.3 rebounds per game. Her final WNBA game was played on August 17, 1998 (only 14 months after her debut game) in a 75-64 loss to the Phoenix Mercury recording 1 point and 1 rebound in 15 minutes of playing time.

== Coaching career ==
Reiss became assistant coach of the Starzz in 2001 and remained with the team through 2003 (staying with the team when it relocated to San Antonio, Texas as the San Antonio Silver Stars).

In 2002, Reiss was selected to the ACC's 50th anniversary women's basketball team.

In 2011, Reiss joined San Diego State as assistant coach of the Lady Aztecs basketball team. She helped direct the team to a sweep of the Mountain West regular season and championship, as well as a spot in the NCAA championship tournament.

In 2013, Reiss joined the Cal State-Fullerton as one of their women's basketball team's assistant coaches.

In 2015, Reiss joined the Syracuse staff as one of their women's basketball assistant coaches.

On April 18, 2019, she was named the 9th head coach in Rhode Island women's basketball history.

Reiss was named as the head coach of Florida on March 23, 2026.

== Acting career ==
Reiss debuted as an actress in a 1999 episode of the television comedy, Sister Sister (The Road Less Travelled). In 2002, she played teammate, Vicki Sanchez, to Juwanna Mann in the comedy film, of the same title. That same year, she played the Burge’s volleyball coach in the made-for-television film Double Teamed.

She also appeared in Love and Basketball.

== Outside basketball ==
Reiss is an avid public speaker in the Salt Lake City, Utah area, where she became based after she was signed by the Starzz. In the 1998 off-season, Reiss joined the Utah Jazz television broadcasting team. She also has a basketball camp and owns a business named Hoop Dreams, Inc, and one named T & R Management. Reiss has also worked as a personal trainer at Gold's Gym and as operations manager for ProTech.

== WNBA statistics ==
Legend
GP	Games played	GS	Games started	MPG	Minutes per game	RPG	Rebounds per game
APG	Assists per game	SPG	Steals per game	BPG	Blocks per game	PPG	Points per game
TO	Turnovers per game	FG%	Field-goal percentage	3P%	3-point field-goal percentage	FT%	Free-throw percentage
**Bold**	Career best	°	League leader

Year	Team	GP	GS	MPG	FG%	3P%	FT%	RPG	APG	SPG	BPG	TO	PPG
1997	Utah	**28**	**26**	**29.7**	.312	**.297**	**.764**	**2.8**	**3.1**	**0.8**	**0.1**	2.2	**7.7**
1998	Utah	22	17	21.7	**.403**	.296	.655	1.8	2.2	0.5	0.0	**1.1**	6.5
Career	2 years, 1 team	50	43	26.2	.345	.297	.726	2.3	2.7	0.7	0.1	1.7	7.2

== Head coaching record ==
Record table
Season	Team	Overall	Conference	Standing	Postseason
**Rhode Island Rams** (Atlantic 10 Conference) (2019–2026)
2019–20	Rhode Island	13–16	6–10	11th	
2020–21	Rhode Island	11–8	11–4	3rd	
2021–22	Rhode Island	22–7	12–2	2nd	WNIT First Round
2022–23	Rhode Island	26–7	14–2	T-1st	WNIT Super Sixteen
2023–24	Rhode Island	21–14	10–6	6th	
2024–25	Rhode Island	17–16	11–7	T–5th	
2025–26	Rhode Island	28–5	16–2	T–1st	NCAA First Round
Rhode Island:		138–73 (.654)	80–33 (.708)		
**Florida Gators** (Southeastern Conference) (2026–present)
2026–27	Florida	0–0	0–0		
Florida:		0–0 (–)	0–0 (–)		
Total:		138–73 (.654)			
National champion Postseason invitational champion Conference regular season champion Conference regular season and conference tournament champion Division regular season champion Division regular season and conference tournament champion Conference tournament champion
