= 1997 Utah Starzz season =

- Head coach: Denise Taylor
- Arena: Delta Center

Results
- Record: 7–21 (.250)
- Place: 4th (Western)
- Playoff finish: Did not qualify

The 1997 WNBA season was the inaugural season for the Utah Starzz. The Starzz were partially named after the old ABA team, the Utah Stars, but with the zz at the end like the Utah Jazz. The franchise held the distinction of having the worst record in the WNBA in 1997.

== Transactions ==
=== WNBA allocation draft ===
Player	Nationality	School/Team/Country
Elena Baranova	Soviet Union	CSKA Moscow (Russia)
Lady Hardmon	United States	Georgia

=== WNBA elite draft ===
Round	Pick	Player	Nationality	School/Team/Country
1	1	Dena Head	United States	Tennessee
2	9	Wendy Palmer	United States	Virginia

=== WNBA draft ===
Round	Pick	Player	Nationality	School/Team/Country
1	5	Tammi Reiss	United States	Virginia
2	12	Jessie Hicks	United States	Maryland
3	21	Raegan Scott	United States	Colorado
4	28	Kim Williams	United States	DePaul

=== Transactions ===
Date	Transaction
January 22, 1997	Drafted Elena Baranova and Lady Hardmon in the 1997 WNBA Allocation Draft
February 27, 1997	Drafted Dena Head and Wendy Palmer in the 1997 WNBA Elite Draft
April 19, 1997	Hired Denise Taylor as Head Coach
April 28, 1997	Drafted Tammi Reiss, Jessie Hicks, Raegan Scott and Kim Williams in the 1997 WNBA draft
June 20, 1997	Waived Megan Compain

== Roster ==
1997 Utah Starzz roster
Players
Coaches

Pos.	No.	Nat.	Name	Height	Weight	DOB	From	Yrs
F	28	(Soviet Union)	Baranova, Elena	6' 5" (1.96m)	182 lb (83kg)	1972-01-28		R
C	40	(United States)	Booker, Karen	6' 1" (1.85m)	170 lb (77kg)	1965-04-10	Vanderbilt	R
G/F	34	(United States)	Carter, Deborah	6' 1" (1.85m)	185 lb (84kg)	1972-01-03	Georgia	R
G	22	(New Zealand)	Compain, Megan	5' 9" (1.75m)		1975-09-18	Saint Joseph's	R
F	27	(United States)	Hardmon, Lady	5' 10" (1.78m)	160 lb (73kg)	1975-09-12	Georgia	R
G	11	(United States)	Head, Dena	5' 10" (1.78m)	175 lb (79kg)	1970-08-16	Tennessee	R
F/C	25	(United States)	Hicks, Jessie	6' 4" (1.93m)	188 lb (85kg)	1971-12-02	Maryland	R
F	15	(United States)	Koss, Greta	6' 1" (1.85m)	145 lb (66kg)	1974-06-12	Montana	R
F	14	(United States)	Palmer, Wendy	6' 2" (1.88m)	165 lb (75kg)	1974-08-12	Virginia	R
G	32	(United States)	Reiss, Tammi	5' 6" (1.68m)	129 lb (59kg)	1970-04-02	Virginia	R
F/C	52	(United States)	Scott, Raegan	6' 3" (1.91m)	169 lb (77kg)	1975-08-12	Colorado	R
G	23	(United States)	Williams, Kim	5' 6" (1.68m)	136 lb (62kg)	1974-10-14	DePaul	R

Head coach
(United States) Denise Taylor (Texas Southern)
Assistant coaches
(United States) Greg Williams

Legend

- (C) Team captain
- (DP) Unsigned draft pick
- (FA) Free agent
- (S) Suspended
- Injured

== Schedule ==
=== Regular season ===
1997 game log
Total: 7–21 (Home: 5–10; Road: 2–12)
June: 1–3 (Home: 1–2; Road: 0–1)

Game	Date	Team	Score	High points	High rebounds	High assists	Location Attendance	Record
1	June 21	Sacramento	L 60–70	Tammi Reiss (14)	Baranova; Palmer; Reiss (7)	Lady Hardmon (6)	Delta Center	0–1
2	June 23	Los Angeles	W 102–89	Wendy Palmer (28)	Elena Baranova (10)	Baranova; Reiss (5)	Delta Center	1–1
3	June 26	@ Cleveland	L 63–74	Wendy Palmer (15)	Wendy Palmer (12)	Baranova; Palmer; Williams (4)	Gund Arena	1–2
4	June 28	Houston	L 58–76	Wendy Palmer (14)	Baranova; Carter (6)	Booker; Palmer (4)	Delta Center	1–3

July : 3–10 (Home: 1–4; Road: 2–6)

Game	Date	Team	Score	High points	High rebounds	High assists	Location Attendance	Record
5	July 2	@ Sacramento	W 73–68 (OT)	Wendy Palmer (18)	Wendy Palmer (11)	Kim Williams (5)	ARCO Arena	2–3
6	July 3	Phoenix	L 55–77	Wendy Palmer (19)	Elena Baranova (12)	Hicks; Williams (2)	Delta Center	2–4
7	July 5	New York	L 53–66	Lady Hardmon (14)	Wendy Palmer (10)	Kim Williams (4)	Delta Center	2–5
8	July 7	Sacramento	L 69–79	Wendy Palmer (20)	Wendy Palmer (6)	Lady Hardmon (5)	Delta Center	2–6
9	July 11	@ Los Angeles	L 68–75	Wendy Palmer (17)	Elena Baranova (8)	Baranova; Williams	Great Western Forum	2–7
10	July 12	Phoenix	W 52–51	Wendy Palmer (15)	Wendy Palmer (10)	Lady Hardmon (6)	Delta Center	3–7
11	July 14	@ Houston	L 56–79	Lady Hardmon (14)	Elena Baranova (13)	Kim Williams (10)	The Summit	3–8
12	July 16	@ Charlotte	L 63–75	Palmer; Williams (17)	Tammi Reiss (7)	Reiss; Williams (5)	Charlotte Coliseum	3–9
13	July 17	@ New York	L 54–80	Hardmon; Palmer (14)	Lady Hardmon (6)	Kim Williams (4)	Madison Square Garden	3–10
14	July 21	@ Cleveland	L 68–95	Elena Baranova (25)	Elena Baranova (7)	Baranova; Williams (4)	Gund Arena	3–11
15	July 22	@ New York	W 78–71	Elena Baranova (23)	Wendy Palmer (10)	Reiss; Williams (4)	Madison Square Garden	4–11
16	July 26	Cleveland	L 66–77	Elena Baranova (26)	Elena Baranova (9)	Tammi Reiss (5)	Delta Center	4–12
17	July 30	@ Los Angeles	L 69–91	Tammi Reiss (15)	Wendy Palmer (8)	Dena Head (7)	Great Western Forum	4–13

August : 3–8 (Home: 3–3; Road: 0–5)

Game	Date	Team	Score	High points	High rebounds	High assists	Location Attendance	Record
18	August 2	Houston	W 74–63	Elena Baranova (17)	Elena Baranova (12)	Hardmon; Head; Koss (3)	Delta Center	5–13
19	August 4	Charlotte	W 73–70	Baranova; Reiss (17)	Wendy Palmer (9)	Tammi Reiss (8)	Delta Center	6–13
20	August 6	@ Phoenix	L 46–78	Elena Baranova (16)	Baranova; Palmer (5)	Tammi Reiss (5)	America West Arena	6–14
21	August 8	@ Sacramento	L 78–93	Wendy Palmer (25)	Wendy Palmer (9)	Hardmon; Reiss (4)	ARCO Arena	6–15
22	August 11	Cleveland	L 59–74	Tammi Reiss (12)	Wendy Palmer (11)	Lady Hardmon (5)	Delta Center	6–16
23	August 12	@ Houston	L 56–76	Wendy Palmer (18)	Wendy Palmer (11)	Lady Hardmon (4)	The Summit	6–17
24	August 16	Los Angeles	L 64–74	Wendy Palmer (27)	Wendy Palmer (13)	Tammi Reiss (4)	Delta Center	6–18
25	August 17	@ Phoenix	L 63–71 (OT)	Wendy Palmer (21)	Greta Koss (11)	Tammi Reiss (4)	America West Arena	6–19
26	August 19	New York	W 81–75	Wendy Palmer (19)	Wendy Palmer (9)	Dena Head (4)	Delta Center	7–19
27	August 21	Charlotte	L 56–66	Wendy Palmer (20)	Wendy Palmer (14)	Baranova; Head; Palmer; Reiss (3)	Delta Center	7–20
28	August 24	@ Charlotte	L 52–70	Jessie Hicks (13)	Elena Baranova (10)	Elena Baranova (4)	Charlotte Coliseum	7–21

1997 season schedule

=== Season standings ===
Western Conference	W	L	PCT	Conf.	GB
Phoenix Mercury ^{x}	16	12	.571	9–3	–
Los Angeles Sparks ^{o}	14	14	.500	8–4	2.0
Sacramento Monarchs ^{o}	10	18	.357	4–8	6.0
Utah Starzz ^{o}	7	21	.250	3–9	9.0

== Statistics ==
Legend
GP	Games played	GS	Games started	MPG	Minutes per game	RPG	Rebounds per game
APG	Assists per game	SPG	Steals per game	BPG	Blocks per game	PPG	Points per game
FG%	Field-goal percentage	3P%	3-point field-goal percentage	FT%	Free-throw percentage	TO	Turnovers per game
PF	Fouls per game		Team leader		League leader

=== Regular season ===
Player	GP	GS	MPG	FG%	3P%	FT%	RPG	APG	SPG	BPG	PPG
Wendy Palmer	28	28	33.4	.374	.250	.676	8.0	1.7	1.7	0.2	15.8
Elena Baranova	28	27	32.6	.390	.377	.694	7.4	2.2	1.5	2.3	12.2
Tammi Reiss	28	26	29.7	.312	.297	.764	2.8	3.1	0.8	0.1	7.7
Lady Hardmon	28	24	24.7	.347	.100	.655	3.0	2.4	0.8	0.1	5.5
Kim Williams	28	10	21.7	.384	.265	.774	2.9	2.1	1.4	0.3	8.1
Greta Koss	13	10	20.6	.517	.667	.750	2.8	0.8	0.7	0.3	3.4
Dena Head	27	4	17.4	.390	.313	.884	2.3	1.7	0.5	0.3	5.7
Deborah Carter	18	7	15.9	.385	.143	.714	2.7	0.4	0.7	0.1	3.9
Karen Booker	26	4	12.3	.333	.000	.568	3.1	0.9	0.9	0.6	2.3
Jessie Hicks	26	0	10.1	.463	.000	.563	1.4	0.4	0.5	0.4	3.2
Reagan Scott	8	0	5.4	.385	N/A	1.000	0.9	0.1	0.1	0.4	1.5
Megan Compain	5	0	3.8	.286	,250	N/A	1.0	0.4	0.8	0.2	1.0

^{‡}Waived/Released during the season
^{†}Traded during the season
^{≠}Acquired during the season

- Elena Baranova ranked third in the WNBA in total rebounds with 207
- Dena Head ranked fifth in the WNBA in Free Throw Pct with .844
- Wendy Palmer ranked second in the WNBA in total rebounds with 225.
- Wendy Palmer ranked sixth in the WNBA in field goals with 157.
- Wendy Palmer ranked fourth in the WNBA in points with 443 points.
- Wendy Palmer ranked ninth in the WNBA in minutes per game with 33.4
- Wendy Palmer ranked fourth in the WNBA in points per game with 15.8
- Tammi Reiss ranked tenth in the WNBA in assists with 87.

== Awards and honors ==
- Elena Baranova: Led WNBA, Blocks, 63
- Elena Baranova: Led WNBA, Blocks per game, 2.2
- Elena Baranova, Ranked second in the WNBA (tied), Defensive Rebounds, 151
- Wanda Guyton: Ranked second in WNBA (tied), Offensive Rebounds, 76
- Wendy Palmer: Led WNBA, Field Goal Attempts, 420
- Wendy Palmer: Ranked second in the WNBA, Free Throws, 117
