= Person County Airport =

Raleigh Regional Airport at Person County
- IATA: none; ICAO: KTDF; FAA LID: TDF

Summary
- Airport type: Public
- Owner: Person County
- Serves: Roxboro, North Carolina
- Location: Timberlake, North Carolina
- Elevation AMSL: 609 ft / 186 m
- Coordinates: 36°17′05″N 078°59′05″W
- Website: https://raleighregional.com/
- Interactive map of Raleigh Regional Airport at Person County

Runways
Direction	Length		Surface
Direction	ft	m	Surface
6/24	6,005	1,830	Asphalt

Statistics (2021)
- Aircraft operations (year ending 7/30/2021): 34,750
- Based aircraft: 33
- Source: Federal Aviation Administration

Person County Airport (ICAO: KTDF, FAA LID: TDF), also known as Raleigh Regional Airport at Person County, is a county-owned, public-use airport in Person County, North Carolina, United States. It is located six nautical miles (11 km) south of the central business district of Roxboro.

According to the FAA's National Plan of Integrated Airport Systems for 2009–2013, it is a general aviation airport (it had previously been a reliever airport).

Although many U.S. airports use the same three-letter location identifier for the FAA and IATA, this airport is assigned TDF by the FAA but has no designation from the IATA.

== Facilities and aircraft ==
Person County Airport covers an area of 218 acres (88 ha) at an elevation of 609 feet (186 m) above mean sea level. It has one runway designated 6/24 with an asphalt surface measuring 6,005 by 100 feet (1,830 x 30 m).

For the 12-month period ending July 30, 2021, the airport had 34,750 aircraft operations, an average of 95 per day: 95% general aviation, 3% military and 2% air taxi. At that time there were 33 aircraft based at this airport: 29 single-engine and 4 multi-engine.

== See also ==
- List of airports in North Carolina
