= Erin Alexander =

American basketball player (born 1975)

Personal information
- Born: April 25, 1975 (age 51) Solvang, California, U.S.
- Listed height: 5 ft 10 in (1.78 m)
- Listed weight: 153 lb (69 kg)

Career information
- High school: Santa Ynez (Santa Ynez, California)
- College: UC Santa Barbara (1993–1997)
- Position: Guard
- Number: 15

Career history
- 1998: Los Angeles Sparks
- 1998: Utah Starzz

Career highlights
- Big West Player of the Year (1997); 2× First-team All-Big West (1996, 1997)
- Stats at WNBA.com
- Stats at Basketball Reference

Erin Christine Alexander (born April 25, 1975) is an American former basketball player. Alexanders played one season in the Women's National Basketball Association (WNBA), splitting it between the Los Angeles Sparks for 12 games and the Utah Starzz for 8 during the 1998 WNBA season. During her time in the league, she averaged 2 points over 7.1 minutes over 20 games.

Aldridge attended University of California, Santa Barbara, where she played with the Gauchos. She graduated from UCSB in 1998.

== Career statistics ==
Legend
GP	Games played	GS	Games started	MPG	Minutes per game	RPG	Rebounds per game
APG	Assists per game	SPG	Steals per game	BPG	Blocks per game	PPG	Points per game
TO	Turnovers per game	FG%	Field-goal percentage	3P%	3-point field-goal percentage	FT%	Free-throw percentage
**Bold**	Career best	°	League leader

=== WNBA ===
==== Regular season ====
Year	Team	GP	GS	MPG	FG%	3P%	FT%	RPG	APG	SPG	BPG	TO	PPG
1998	Los Angeles	8	0	**9.1**	**31.8**	**37.5**	100.0	**1.9**	**0.8**	**0.3**	0.0	**0.9**	**2.8**
1998	Utah	**12**	0	5.7	22.7	26.3	100.0	0.3	0.3	0.1	0.0	0.4	1.4
Career	1 year, 2 teams	20	0	7.1	27.3	31.4	100.0	0.9	0.5	0.2	0.0	0.6	2.0

=== College ===
Year	Team	GP	GS	MPG	FG%	3P%	FT%	RPG	APG	SPG	BPG	TO	PPG
1993–94	UCSB	27	-	-	33.6	35.6	**85.5**	1.4	1.9	0.9	0.1	-	6.2
1994–95	UCSB	26	-	-	37.5	31.7	73.4	3.3	3.0	2.2	0.2	-	11.0
1995–96	UCSB	**31**	-	-	**42.0**	**41.4**	74.8	4.2	3.1	**2.7**	**0.3**	-	18.4
1996–97	UCSB	30	-	-	41.8	39.4	81.2	**5.6**	**4.2**	2.1	0.2	-	**18.9**
**Career**		114	-	-	40.1	38.3	78.8	3.7	3.1	2.0	0.2	-	13.9
Statistics retrieved from Sports-Reference.
