= Frank Layden =

American basketball coach (1932–2025)

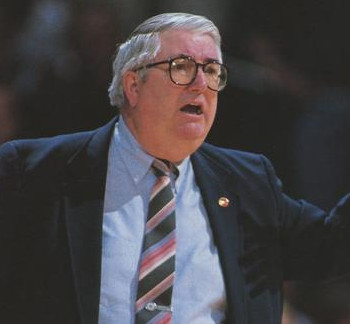
- Layden, circa 1988

Personal information
- Born: January 5, 1932 New York City, New York, U.S.
- Died: July 9, 2025 (aged 93) Salt Lake City, Utah, U.S.

Career information
- High school: Fort Hamilton (Brooklyn, New York)
- College: Niagara (1950–1953)
- Coaching career: 1968–1988

Career history

Coaching
- 1968–1976: Niagara
- 1976–1979: Atlanta Hawks (assistant)
- 1981–1988: Utah Jazz
- 1998–1999: Utah Starzz

Career highlights
- As coach: NBA Coach of the Year (1984); NBA All-Star Game head coach (1984); J. Walter Kennedy Citizenship Award (1984); Chuck Daly Lifetime Achievement Award (2019); No. 1 retired by Utah Jazz; As executive: NBA Executive of the Year (1984)

Career coaching record
- NBA: 277–294 (.485)
- WNBA: 4–11 (.267)
- Record at Basketball Reference

Francis Patrick Layden (January 5, 1932 – July 9, 2025) was an American basketball coach and executive for the Utah Jazz of the National Basketball Association (NBA). He was named both the NBA Coach of the Year and NBA Executive of the Year in 1984. Layden was also head coach of the Utah Starzz of the Women's National Basketball Association (WNBA).

== Early life ==
Layden grew up in Brooklyn and was an All-City basketball and baseball player at Fort Hamilton High School. He played three seasons of varsity basketball and baseball at Niagara University.

== Coaching career ==
=== Early career ===
Layden was the head baseball coach at his alma mater, Niagara University, from 1953 to 1955, and compiled a record of 15–15–1. He also spent one season as freshman basketball coach. In 1957, he was hired to teach social studies and coach junior varsity football, baseball, and basketball coach at St. Agnes High School in Rockville Centre, New York. In 1960, he became head basketball coach at Seton Hall High School in Patchogue, New York. In 1966, he became athletic director at Adelphi Suffolk College.

=== Niagara (1968–1976) ===
In 1968, Layden was named varsity basketball coach at Niagara. He compiled a 119-97 record over eight seasons, including two NIT appearances (1972 and 1976) and the school's first trip to the NCAA Division I men's basketball tournament (1970). His Niagara players included Calvin Murphy, Marshall Wingate, and Andy Walker.

=== Atlanta Hawks (1976–1979) ===
In 1976, Layden was hired to be an assistant coach with the NBA's Atlanta Hawks joining former Niagara teammate Hubie Brown. He also served as the team's director of player personnel.

=== Utah Jazz (1981–1988) ===
In 1979, Layden was hired to be the general manager of the then New Orleans Jazz. In December 1981, he replaced Tom Nissalke as head coach after the team got off to a 8–12 start.

Layden was responsible for drafting and developing franchise mainstays Darrell Griffith, Mark Eaton, John Stockton, and Karl Malone, and trading for Adrian Dantley. The Jazz made the playoffs every season from 1984 to 1988. In 1984, Layden was awarded the NBA's Coach of the Year, the NBA's Executive of the Year, and the NBA's J. Walter Kennedy Citizenship Awards.

In 1986, Layden was given the title of vice president of basketball operations and continued to make player personnel decisions. The following season, he was succeeded as general manager by team president Dave Checketts. Layden intended on retiring after the 1988–89 season, but resigned on December 9, 1988, citing job pressure and abuse from fans. At the time of his resignation, the Jazz had an 11–6 record and were leading the Midwest Division. He was succeeded by assistant coach Jerry Sloan. He remained with the Jazz as team president until his retirement on December 28, 1999.

=== Utah Starzz (1998–1999) ===
In 1998, Layden returned to coaching with the Utah Starzz of the Women's National Basketball Association, replacing Denise Taylor after a 6-13 start. The team won 2 of its 11 games after Layden took over. He returned for the 1999 season, but resigned after four games. He was replaced by assistant and former USC Trojans women's basketball coach Fred Williams.

== Retirement and death ==
Layden continued to live with his wife, Barbara, in Salt Lake City, where he died on July 9, 2025, at the age of 93.

== Head coaching record ==
=== NBA ===
Legend
Regular season	G	Games coached	W	Games won	L	Games lost	W–L %	Win–loss %
Playoffs	PG	Playoff games	PW	Playoff wins	PL	Playoff losses	PW–L %	Playoff win–loss %

Team	Year	G	W	L	W–L%	Finish	PG	PW	PL	PW–L%	Result
Utah	1981–82	62	17	45	.274	6th in Midwest	–	–	–	–	Missed Playoffs
Utah	1982–83	82	30	52	.366	5th in Midwest	–	–	–	–	Missed Playoffs
Utah	1983–84	82	45	37	.549	1st in Midwest	11	5	6	.455	Lost in Conf. Semifinals
Utah	1984–85	82	41	41	.500	4th in Midwest	10	4	6	.400	Lost in Conf. Semifinals
Utah	1985–86	82	42	40	.512	4th in Midwest	4	1	3	.250	Lost in First round
Utah	1986–87	82	44	38	.537	2nd in Midwest	5	2	3	.400	Lost in First round
Utah	1987–88	82	47	35	.573	3rd in Midwest	11	6	5	.545	Lost in Conf. Semifinals
Utah	1988–89	17	11	6	.647	(resigned)	–	–	–	–	–
Career		571	277	294	.485		41	18	23	.439	

=== WNBA ===
Legend
Regular season	G	Games coached	W	Games won	L	Games lost	W–L %	Win–loss %
Playoffs	PG	Playoff games	PW	Playoff wins	PL	Playoff losses	PW–L %	Playoff win–loss %

Team	Year	G	W	L	W–L%	Finish	PG	PW	PL	PW–L%	Result
Utah	1998	11	2	9	.182	5th in West	–	–	–	–	Missed Playoffs
Utah	1999	4	2	2	.500	(resigned)	–	–	–	–	–
Career		15	4	11	.267						
