= Utah Starzz =

- Conference: Western
- Leagues: WNBA
- Founded: 1997
- History: Utah Starzz (1997–2002); San Antonio Silver Stars (2003–2013); San Antonio Stars (2014–2017); Las Vegas Aces (2018–present)
- Arena: Delta Center
- Location: Salt Lake City, Utah
- Team colors: Green, Purple, Light Blue, Copper, Black, White
- General manager: Jay Francis
- Head coach: Candi Harvey
- Ownership: Larry H. Miller
Home	Away

The Utah Starzz were a Women's National Basketball Association (WNBA) team based in Salt Lake City. They began play in the 1997 WNBA season as one of the league's eight original teams.

== History ==
One of the eight original WNBA teams, the Starzz were partially named after the old ABA team Utah Stars. They were the sister team to the NBA's Utah Jazz.

In 2002, after five seasons, Utah Jazz ownership lost interest in keeping the Starzz, leaving the team at risk of folding. No local buyers could be found, so the Starzz announced their intention to move out of Salt Lake City. On December 5, 2002, the team was purchased by Spurs Sports & Entertainment, and it was announced that they would move immediately to San Antonio and change their nickname to the Silver Stars. The team relocated and became the San Antonio Silver Stars in 2003.

=== Uniforms ===
- 1997–2002: For home games, white with blue on the sides and shoulders and white Starzz logo text on the chest. For away games, blue with purple on the sides and white Starzz logo text on the chest. The Starzz logo is on the shorts.

== Season-by-season records ==
Season	Team	Conference		Regular season			Playoff Results
Season	Team	Conference		W	L	PCT	Playoff Results
Utah Starzz
1997	1997	West	4th	7	21	.250	
1998	1998	West	5th	8	22	.267	
1999	1999	West	6th	15	17	.469	
2000	2000	West	5th	18	14	.563	
2001	2001	West	3rd	19	13	.594	Lost Conference Semifinals (Sacramento, 0–2)
2002	2002	West	3rd	20	12	.625	Won Conference Semifinals (Houston, 2–1); Lost Conference Finals (Los Angeles, 0–2)
Regular season				87	99	.468	0 Conference Championships
Playoffs				2	5	.286	0 WNBA Championships

== Players ==
=== Final roster ===
2002 Utah Starzz roster
Players
Coaches

Pos.	No.	Nat.	Name	Height	Weight	From
G	43	(Spain)	Aguilar, Elisa	5' 8" (1.73m)	156 lb (71kg)	George Washington
G	8	(United States)	Azzi, Jennifer	5' 8" (1.73m)	144 lb (65kg)	Stanford
G	20	(United States)	Caufield, LaNeishea	5' 9" (1.75m)	165 lb (75kg)	Oklahoma
F	34	(United States)	Crockrom, Danielle	6' 1" (1.85m)	158 lb (72kg)	Baylor
C	12	(Poland)	Dydek, Margo	7' 2" (2.18m)	223 lb (101kg)	Poland
G	3	(United States)	Ferdinand, Marie	5' 9" (1.75m)	153 lb (69kg)	LSU
F/C	50	(United States)	Gardner, Andrea	6' 3" (1.91m)	190 lb (86kg)	Howard
G	15	(United States)	Goodson, Adrienne	6' 0" (1.83m)	160 lb (73kg)	Old Dominion
C	54	(United States)	Herrig, Amy	6' 4" (1.93m)	189 lb (86kg)	Iowa
F	23	(United States)	Johnson, LaTonya	6' 1" (1.85m)	149 lb (68kg)	Memphis
G	21	(United States)	Randall, Semeka	5' 8" (1.73m)	170 lb (77kg)	Tennessee
F	24	(United States)	Williams, Natalie	6' 2" (1.88m)	210 lb (95kg)	UCLA

Head coach
(United States) Candi Harvey (Ouachita Baptist)
Assistant coaches
(United States) Tammi Reiss (Eastern Michigan)
(United States) Bobbi Morse (Virginia)

Legend

- (C) Team captain
- (DP) Unsigned draft pick
- (FA) Free agent
- (S) Suspended
- Injured

=== Notable players ===
- Margo Dydek
- Marie Ferdinand-Harris
- Kristen Rasmussen
- Olympia Scott
- Natalie Williams
- Fran Harris
- Erin Alexander
- Adrienne Goodson

=== FIBA Hall of Fame ===
Utah Starzz Hall of Famers
Players
No.	Name	Position	Tenure	Inducted
12	Margo Dydek	C	1998–2002	2019

== Coaches ==
=== Head coaches ===
- Denise Taylor (1997–1998)
- Frank Layden (1998–1999)
- Fred Williams (1999–2001)
- Candi Harvey (2001–2002)

== General managers ==
- Tim Howells (1997–1999)

== All-time notes ==
=== Draft picks ===
- 1997 Elite Draft: Dena Head (1), Wendy Palmer (9)
- 1997 WNBA Draft: Tammi Reiss (5), Jessie Hicks (12), Raegan Scott (21), Kim Williams (28)
- 1998 WNBA Draft: Margo Dydek (1), Olympia Scott (11), LaTonya Johnson (21), Tricia Bader (31)
- 1999 WNBA Draft: Natalie Williams (3), Debbie Black (15), Adrienne Goodson (27), Dalma Ivanyi (39)
- 2000 WNBA Draft: Naomi Mulitauaopele (12), Stacy Frese (35), Kristen Rasmussen (51)
- 2001 WNBA Draft: Marie Ferdinand (8), Michaela Pavlickova (24), Shea Ralph (40), Cara Consuegra (56)
- 2002 WNBA Draft: Danielle Crockrom (11), Andrea Gardner (27), Edmarie Lumbsley (43), Jaclyn Winfield (59)

=== All-stars ===
- 1999: Natalie Williams
- 2000: Natalie Williams
- 2001: Natalie Williams
- 2002: Marie Ferdinand, Adrienne Goodson
