= 1999 WNBA Championship =

US basketball championship

1999 WNBA Finals
Team	Coach	Wins
Houston Comets	Van Chancellor	2
New York Liberty	Richie Adubato	1
- Dates: September 2-5
- MVP: Cynthia Cooper (Houston Comets)
- Hall of Famers: Comets: Cynthia Cooper (2010); Sheryl Swoopes (2016); Tina Thompson (2018); Liberty: Becky Hammon (2023); Rebecca Lobo (2017; did not play); Teresa Weatherspoon (2019); Coaches: Van Chancellor (2007)
- Eastern finals: New York defeated Charlotte, 2–1
- Western finals: Houston defeated Los Angeles, 2–0

The 1999 WNBA Championship was the championship series of the 1999 WNBA season, and the conclusion of the season's playoffs. The Houston Comets, top-seeded champions of the Western Conference, defeated the New York Liberty, top-seeded champions of the Eastern Conference, two games to one in a best-of-three series. This was Houston's third title.

The Comets made their third appearance in the Finals in franchise history. The Liberty made their second Finals appearance.

Going into the series, no other team except the Houston Comets had ever won a WNBA championship (1997 and 1998).

The Comets had a 26–6 record (.813), good enough to receive home-court advantage over the Liberty (18–14).

== Road to the finals ==
Houston Comets		New York Liberty
26–6 (.813); 1st West, 1st overall	Regular season	18–14 (.563); 1st East, 4th overall
Received a bye	Conference Semifinals	Received a bye
Defeated the (2) Los Angeles Sparks, 2–1	Conference Finals	Defeated the (3) Charlotte Sting, 2–1

=== Regular season series ===
The Comets and the Liberty split the regular season series:

July 3

Recap at the Wayback Machine (archived August 24, 1999)

New York Liberty 50, Houston Comets 65

Compaq Center, Houston
Attendance: 12,003

August 8

Recap at the Wayback Machine (archived March 5, 2001)

Houston Comets 71, New York Liberty 74

Madison Square Garden, New York
Attendance: 19,563

== Game summaries ==
All times listed below are Eastern Daylight Time.

=== Game 1 ===
Lifetime

September 2

Recap at the Wayback Machine (archived April 22, 2001)

Houston Comets 73, New York Liberty 60
Scoring by half: 29–20, 44–40
Pts: Cooper (29); Rebs: Thompson (7); Asts: Cooper (6)	Pts: Witherspoon (18); Rebs: Wicks (11); Asts: Weatherspoon (10)

Madison Square Garden, New York
Attendance: 17,113
Referees:
- Sally Bell
- Derek Collins
- Gary Zielinski

=== Game 2 ===
NBC

September 4

Recap at the Wayback Machine (archived April 22, 2001)

New York Liberty 68, Houston Comets 67
Scoring by half: 23–37, 45–30
Pts: Robinson (20); Rebs: Hampton (9); Asts: Weatherspoon (5)	Pts: Thompson (16); Rebs: Swoopes, Tzekova (6); Asts: Cooper (6)

Compaq Center, Houston
Attendance: 16,285
Referees:
- June Corteau
- Courtney Kirkland
- Jason Phillips

With Houston leading 67–65 over New York and the Liberty out of timeouts with only 2.4 seconds remaining on the clock after Tina Thompson's jumper, New York would have to go the length of the court if they had any hope of winning. Kym Hampton inbounded the ball to Teresa Weatherspoon who took a couple dribbles and let the ball fly 50 feet away from the basket. The ball smacked off the backboard and banked into the basket and the Liberty won the game 68–67. The lasting image of this moment is Weatherspoon falling over on the ground smiling as her teammates mob her from the bench.

=== Game 3 ===
NBC

September 5

Recap at the Wayback Machine (archived September 18, 2000)

New York Liberty 47, Houston Comets 59
Scoring by half: 25–33, 22–26
Pts: Wicks (11); Rebs: Wicks (9); Asts: Robinson (3)	Pts: Cooper (24); Rebs: Jackson (11); Asts: Henning (2)

Compaq Center, Houston
Attendance: 16,285
Referees:
- Sally Bell
- Stan Gaxiola
- Michael Price

== Awards ==
- 1999 WNBA champion: Houston Comets
- Finals MVP: Cynthia Cooper

== Rosters ==
1999 Houston Comets Finals roster
Players
Coaches

Pos.	No.	Nat.	Name	Height	Weight	From
F	4	(Brazil)	Arcain, Janeth	5' 11" (1.8m)	147 lb (67kg)	Brazil
G	14	(United States)	Cooper, Cynthia	5' 10" (1.78m)	150 lb (68kg)	USC
G	34	(United States)	Henning, Sonja	5' 7" (1.7m)	143 lb (65kg)	Stanford
F	23	(United States)	Jackson, Tammy	6' 2" (1.88m)	190 lb (86kg)	Florida
C	40	(United States)	Lamb, Monica (IN)	6' 5" (1.96m)	206 lb (93kg)	USC
F	24	(Israel)	Nikolich, Mila	6' 3" (1.91m)	183 lb (83kg)	Israel
G	21	(United States)	Rizzotti, Jennifer	5' 6" (1.68m)	146 lb (66kg)	Connecticut
F	22	(United States)	Swoopes, Sheryl	6' 0" (1.83m)	145 lb (66kg)	Texas Tech
F	7	(United States)	Thompson, Tina	6' 2" (1.88m)	178 lb (81kg)	USC
C	15	(Bulgaria)	Tzekova, Polina	6' 4" (1.93m)	189 lb (86kg)	Bulgaria
F	13	(Spain)	Valdemoro, Amaya	6' 1" (1.85m)	160 lb (73kg)	Spain
C	52	(United States)	Wolters, Kara	6' 7" (2.01m)	227 lb (103kg)	Connecticut

Head coach
(United States) Van Chancellor (Mississippi State)

Legend

- (C) Team captain
- (DP) Unsigned draft pick
- (FA) Free agent
- (S) Suspended
- Injured

1999 New York Liberty Finals roster
Players
Coaches

Pos.	No.	Nat.	Name	Height	Weight	From
G	25	(United States)	Hammon, Becky	5' 6" (1.68m)	136 lb (62kg)	Colorado State
C	34	(United States)	Hampton, Kym	6' 2" (1.88m)	210 lb (95kg)	Arizona State
G	55	(United States)	Johnson, Vickie	5' 9" (1.75m)	150 lb (68kg)	Louisiana Tech
G	12	(United States)	Jones-Young, Carolyn (IN)	5' 9" (1.75m)	175 lb (79kg)	Auburn
C	5	(United States)	Lacy, Venus	6' 3" (1.91m)	234 lb (106kg)	Louisiana Tech
C	50	(United States)	Lobo, Rebecca (injured)	6' 4" (1.93m)	185 lb (84kg)	Connecticut
F	3	(United States)	Robinson, Crystal	5' 10" (1.78m)	175 lb (79kg)	Southeastern Oklahoma State University
C	31	(United States)	VanGorp, Michele	6' 6" (1.98m)	187 lb (85kg)	Duke
G	4	(United States)	Washington, Coquese	5' 6" (1.68m)	138 lb (63kg)	Notre Dame
G	11	(United States)	Weatherspoon, Teresa	5' 8" (1.73m)	161 lb (73kg)	Louisiana Tech
F	44	(United States)	Whitmore, Tamika	6' 2" (1.88m)	190 lb (86kg)	Memphis
F	23	(United States)	Wicks, Sue	6' 3" (1.91m)	174 lb (79kg)	Rutgers
G	13	(United States)	Witherspoon, Sophia	5' 10" (1.78m)	145 lb (66kg)	Florida

Head coach
(United States) Richie Adubato (William Paterson)

Legend

- (C) Team captain
- (DP) Unsigned draft pick
- (FA) Free agent
- (S) Suspended
- Injured
