= 1997 WNBA Championship =

First championship of the WNBA

Team	Coach	Wins
Houston Comets	Van Chancellor	1
New York Liberty	Nancy Darsch	0
- Dates: August 30
- MVP: Cynthia Cooper (Houston Comets)
- Hall of Famers: Comets: Cynthia Cooper (2010); Sheryl Swoopes (2016); Tina Thompson (2018); Liberty: Rebecca Lobo (2017); Teresa Weatherspoon (2019); Coaches: Van Chancellor (2007)
- Eastern finals: New York defeated Phoenix 59-41
- Western finals: Houston defeated Charlotte 70-54

The 1997 WNBA Championship was the championship game of the 1997 WNBA season, and the conclusion of the season's playoffs. The Houston Comets, top-seeded team of the league, defeated the New York Liberty, second-seeded team, 65-51 to win the league's inaugural championship.

The Comets' 18–10 record gave them home court advantage over New York (17–11).

For the playoffs, the top four teams overall in the league were seeded one to four. Top seed Houston played the four seed Charlotte and the two seed New York played number three Phoenix.

== Road to the final ==
Houston Comets		New York Liberty
18–10 (.643); 1st East, 1st overall	Regular season	17–11 (.607); 2nd East, 2nd overall
Defeated the (4) Charlotte Sting, 70-54	WNBA Semifinals	Defeated the (3) Phoenix Mercury, 59-41

=== Regular season series ===
The Liberty won 3 of the 4 games in the regular season series:

June 26

Recap at the Wayback Machine (archived February 8, 1998)

New York Liberty 62, Houston Comets 60 (OT)

Compaq Center, Houston
Attendance: 8,931

July 2

Recap at the Wayback Machine (archived February 8, 1998)

Houston Comets 67, New York Liberty 70

Madison Square Garden, New York
Attendance: 8,792

July 4

Recap at the Wayback Machine (archived February 8, 1998)

New York Liberty 65, Houston Comets 58

Compaq Center, Houston
Attendance: 10,239

August 17

Recap at the Wayback Machine (archived February 8, 1998)

Houston Comets 70, New York Liberty 55

Madison Square Garden, New York
Attendance: 17,499

== Game summary ==
Time listed below is Eastern Daylight Time.

NBC

August 30
7:00pm

Recap at the Wayback Machine (archived February 8, 1998)

New York Liberty 51, Houston Comets 65
Scoring by half: 24–28, 27–37
Pts: Hampton (13); Rebs: Hampton (13); Asts: Weatherspoon (5)	Pts: Cooper (25); Rebs: Jackson (11); Asts: Cooper (4)

Compaq Center, Houston
Attendance: 16,285
Referees:
- Bell
- Courteau
- Palmer

The Houston Comets became the first WNBA champions, riding the unstoppable Cynthia Cooper and a suffocating defense to a 65–51 victory over the New York Liberty.

Cooper, the fledgling league's leading scorer who was named Most Valuable Player earlier in the week, scored 14 of her 25 points in the pivotal second half, when the Comets had a 10–0 burst and held the Liberty scoreless for nearly 6½ minutes. Tina Thompson added 18 points for the Comets, who turned Houston into "Clutch City" again. The city adopted that nickname during the two-year championship reign of the NBA's Houston Rockets.

Cooper also was named Finals MVP as the sellout crowd of 16,285 saw the Comets come up with their best defensive effort of the season.

Kym Hampton had 13 points and 13 rebounds and Vickie Johnson added 12 points for the Liberty, who picked a bad time for one of their worst offensive displays. A meaningless basket with three seconds remaining by Rebecca Lobo—who was limited to nine points—allowed New York to avoid its lowest point total of the season.

Houston, which edged New York for the Eastern Conference title and knocked off Charlotte in the semifinals, finished the regular season 18–10. The Liberty, who advanced with a semifinal win at Phoenix, were 17–11.

== Awards ==
- 1997 WNBA champion: Houston Comets
- Finals MVP: Cynthia Cooper

== Rosters ==
1997 Houston Comets Finals roster
Players
Coaches

Pos.	No.	Nat.	Name	Height	Weight	From
F	4	(Brazil)	Arcain, Janeth	5' 11" (1.8m)	147 lb (67kg)	Brazil
G	14	(United States)	Cooper, Cynthia	5' 10" (1.78m)	150 lb (68kg)	USC
F	9	(United States)	Guyton, Wanda	6' 1" (1.85m)	178 lb (81kg)	South Florida
G	20	(United States)	Harris, Fran	6' 0" (1.83m)	153 lb (69kg)	Texas
F	23	(United States)	Jackson, Tammy	6' 2" (1.88m)	190 lb (86kg)	Florida
F	33	(United States)	Moore, Yolanda	6' 0" (1.83m)	175 lb (79kg)	Mississippi
G	10	(United States)	Perrot, Kim	5' 5" (1.65m)	130 lb (59kg)	Louisiana
F	22	(United States)	Swoopes, Sheryl	6' 0" (1.83m)	145 lb (66kg)	Texas Tech
F	7	(United States)	Thompson, Tina	6' 2" (1.88m)	178 lb (81kg)	USC
G	5	(United States)	Woosley, Tiffany	5' 7" (1.7m)	132 lb (60kg)	Tennessee

Head coach
(United States) Van Chancellor (Mississippi State)

Legend

- (C) Team captain
- (DP) Unsigned draft pick
- (FA) Free agent
- (S) Suspended
- Injured

1997 New York Liberty Finals roster
Players
Coaches

Pos.	No.	Nat.	Name	Height	Weight	From
G	10	(United States)	Blades, Rhonda	5' 7" (1.7m)	138 lb (63kg)	Vanderbilt
G	22	(United States)	Crumpton-Moorer, Cassandra	5' 11" (1.8m)	175 lb (79kg)	Alabama
G	5	(United States)	Ford, Kisha	5' 10" (1.78m)	153 lb (69kg)	Georgia Tech
C	34	(United States)	Hampton, Kym	6' 2" (1.88m)	210 lb (95kg)	Arizona State
G	55	(United States)	Johnson, Vickie	5' 9" (1.75m)	150 lb (68kg)	Louisiana Tech
C	50	(United States)	Lobo, Rebecca	6' 4" (1.93m)	185 lb (84kg)	Connecticut
F	33	(United States)	Trice, Trena	6' 2" (1.88m)	180 lb (82kg)	NC State
G	11	(United States)	Weatherspoon, Teresa	5' 8" (1.73m)	161 lb (73kg)	Louisiana Tech
F	23	(United States)	Wicks, Sue	6' 3" (1.91m)	174 lb (79kg)	Rutgers
G	13	(United States)	Witherspoon, Sophia	5' 10" (1.78m)	145 lb (66kg)	Florida

Head coach
(United States) Nancy Darsch (Springfield)

Legend

- (C) Team captain
- (DP) Unsigned draft pick
- (FA) Free agent
- (S) Suspended
- Injured
