= 1999 New York Liberty season =

- Head coach: Richie Adubato
- Arena: Madison Square Garden

Results
- Record: 18–14 (.563)
- Place: 1st (Eastern)
- Playoff finish: Lost WNBA Finals

The 1999 WNBA season was the third season for the New York Liberty. The Liberty hosted the first WNBA All-Star Game.

Logo for the inaugural WNBA All-Star Game, held in 1999

== Transactions ==
=== Orlando Miracle expansion draft ===
The following player was selected in the Orlando Miracle expansion draft from the New York Liberty:

Player	Nationality	School/Team/Country
Kisha Ford	United States	Georgia Tech

== WNBA draft ==
Round	Pick	Player	Nationality	School/Team/Country
1	6	Crystal Robinson	United States	Colorado Xplosion
2	18	Michele Van Gorp	United States	Duke
3	30	Tamika Whitmore	United States	Memphis
4	42	Carolyn Young	United States	New England Blizzard

== Transactions ==
Date	Transaction
September 11, 1998	Fired Nancy Darsch as Head Coach
December 9, 1998	Hired Richie Adubato as Head Coach
April 6, 1999	Lost Kisha Ford to the Orlando Miracle in the WNBA expansion draft
May 4, 1999	Drafted Crystal Robinson, Michele Van Gorp, Tamika Whitmore and Carolyn Young in the 1999 WNBA draft
May 24, 1999	Waived Bridgette Gordon and Vanessa Nygaard
June 1, 1999	Signed Venus Lacy
June 7, 1999	Waived Alicia Thompson
June 19, 1999	Signed Becky Hammon

== Roster ==
1999 New York Liberty roster
Players
Coaches

Pos.	No.	Nat.	Name	Height	Weight	DOB	From	Yrs
G	25	(United States)	Hammon, Becky	5' 6" (1.68m)	136 lb (62kg)	1977-03-11	Colorado State	R
C	34	(United States)	Hampton, Kym	6' 2" (1.88m)	210 lb (95kg)	1962-11-03	Arizona State	2
G/F	55	(United States)	Johnson, Vickie	5' 9" (1.75m)	150 lb (68kg)	1972-04-15	Louisiana Tech	2
C	5	(United States)	Lacy, Venus	6' 3" (1.91m)	234 lb (106kg)	1967-02-09	Louisiana Tech	R
C	50	(United States)	Lobo, Rebecca	6' 4" (1.93m)	185 lb (84kg)	1973-10-06	Connecticut	2
F	3	(United States)	Robinson, Crystal	5' 11" (1.8m)	155 lb (70kg)	1974-01-22	SE Oklahoma State	R
C	31	(United States)	Van Gorp, Michele	6' 6" (1.98m)	187 lb (85kg)	1977-05-10	Duke	R
G	4	(United States)	Washington, Coquese	5' 6" (1.68m)	138 lb (63kg)	1971-01-17	Notre Dame	1
G	11	(United States)	Weatherspoon, Teresa	5' 8" (1.73m)	161 lb (73kg)	1965-12-08	Louisiana Tech	2
F	44	(United States)	Whitmore, Tamika	6' 2" (1.88m)	215 lb (98kg)	1977-06-05	Memphis	R
F	23	(United States)	Wicks, Sue	6' 3" (1.91m)	174 lb (79kg)	1966-11-26	Rutgers	2
G/F	13	(United States)	Witherspoon, Sophia	5' 10" (1.78m)	145 lb (66kg)	1969-07-06	Florida	2

Head coach
(United States) Richie Adubato (William Paterson)
Assistant coaches
(United States) Lisa White
(United States) Melissa McFerrin
(United States) Jeff House

Legend

- (C) Team captain
- (DP) Unsigned draft pick
- (FA) Free agent
- (S) Suspended
- Injured

== Schedule ==
=== Regular season ===
1999 game log
Total: 18–14 (Home: 12–4; Road: 6–10)
June: 5–2 (Home: 4–1; Road: 1–1)

Game	Date	Team	Score	High points	High rebounds	High assists	Location Attendance	Record
1	June 10	Cleveland	W 87–60	Vickie Johnson (17)	Kym Hampton (7)	Teresa Weatherspoon (5)	Madison Square Garden	1–0
2	June 12	@ Charlotte	W 68–57	Sophia Witherspoon (17)	Vickie Johnson (10)	Teresa Weatherspoon (5)	Charlotte Coliseum	2–0
3	June 14	Washington	L 63–81	Tamika Whitmore (13)	Hampton; Johnson; Weatherspoon (5)	Johnson; Weatherspoon (4)	Madison Square Garden	2–1
4	June 18	Los Angeles	W 84–72	Vickie Johnson (26)	Kym Hampton (9)	Crystal Robinson (5)	Madison Square Garden	3–1
5	June 20	Detroit	W 69–62	Tamika Whitmore (16)	Hampton; Johnson; Whitmore; Wicks (7)	Teresa Weatherspoon (10)	Madison Square Garden	4–1
6	June 27	Charlotte	W 72–58	Vickie Johnson (14)	Kym Hampton; Wicks (6)	Teresa Weatherspoon (11)	Madison Square Garden	5–1
7	June 28	@ Detroit	L 71–91	Vickie Johnson (18)	Sue Wicks (12)	Teresa Weatherspoon (7)	The Palace of Auburn Hills	5–2

July : 6–8 (Home: 4–2; Road: 2–6)

Game	Date	Team	Score	High points	High rebounds	High assists	Location Attendance	Record
8	July 1	Phoenix	W 83–67	Vickie Johnson (22)	Hampton; Whitmore (6)	Teresa Weatherspoon (8)	Madison Square Garden	6–2
9	July 3	@ Houston	L 50–65	Vickie Johnson (20)	Kym Hampton (12)	Teresa Weatherspoon (4)	Compaq Center	6–3
10	July 5	Sacramento	W 76–63	Vickie Johnson (20)	Hampton; Wicks (9)	Teresa Weatherspoon (9)	Madison Square Garden	7–3
11	July 6	@ Washington	L 63–71	Teresa Weatherspoon (14)	Hampton; Lobo (6)	Johnson; Weatherspoon (6)	MCI Center	7–4
12	July 8	@ Cleveland	W 84–49	Sophia Witherspoon (22)	Vickie Johnson (6)	Teresa Weatherspoon (7)	Gund Arena	8–4
13	July 11	Minnesota	L 56–58	Crystal Robinson (13)	Sue Wicks (8)	Teresa Weatherspoon (7)	Madison Square Garden	8–5
14	July 17	@ Minnesota	L 58–60	Vickie Johnson (17)	Sue Wicks (7)	Johnson; Wicks (4)	Target Center	8–6
15	July 18	Utah	W 88–82 (OT)	Kym Hampton (20)	Kym Hampton (8)	Teresa Weatherspoon (10)	Madison Square Garden	9–6
16	July 20	Orlando	W 61–56	Crystal Robinson (15)	Sue Wicks (10)	Johnson; Weatherspoon (4)	Madison Square Garden	10–6
17	July 22	@ Sacramento	L 55–71	Vickie Johnson (17)	Sue Wicks (6)	Teresa Weatherspoon (7)	ARCO Arena	10–7
18	July 24	@ Los Angeles	L 72–75 (OT)	Crystal Robinson (23)	Sue Wicks (10)	Teresa Weatherspoon (12)	Great Western Forum	10–8
19	July 26	Charlotte	L 69–75 (OT)	Crystal Robinson (23)	Sue Wicks (9)	Teresa Weatherspoon (7)	Madison Square Garden	10–9
20	July 29	@ Orlando	W 73–65 (OT)	Hampton; Witherspoon (21)	Kym Hampton (11)	Teresa Weatherspoon (5)	TD Waterhouse Centre	11–9
21	July 30	@ Charlotte	L 58–62	Tamika Whitmore (13)	Kym Hampton (7)	Johnson; Weatherspoon (7)	Charlotte Coliseum	11–10

August : 7–4 (Home: 4–1; Road: 3–3)

Game	Date	Team	Score	High points	High rebounds	High assists	Location Attendance	Record
22	August 1	Orlando	W 74–61	Vickie Johnson (18)	Kym Hampton (6)	Teresa Weatherspoon (11)	Madison Square Garden	12–10
23	August 3	@ Utah	W 61–59	Vickie Johnson (16)	Teresa Weatherspoon (6)	Teresa Weatherspoon (8)	Delta Center	13–10
24	August 6	@ Phoenix	L 55–68	Crystal Robinson (27)	Crystal Robinson (6)	Teresa Weatherspoon (6)	America West Arena	13–11
25	August 8	Houston	W 74–71	Sophia Witherspoon (22)	Sue Wicks (9)	Vickie Johnson (6)	Madison Square Garden	14–11
26	August 9	@ Orlando	W 80–75	Crystal Robinson (18)	Sue Wicks (7)	Teresa Weatherspoon (7)	TD Waterhouse Centre	15–11
27	August 11	@ Washington	L 56–59 (OT)	Crystal Robinson (16)	Sue Wicks (16)	Vickie Johnson (3)	MCI Center	15–12
28	August 13	@ Detroit	W 60–56	Hampton; Robinson; Wicks (12)	Sue Wicks (10)	Johnson; Weatherspoon (4)	The Palace of Auburn Hills	16–12
29	August 15	Detroit	L 57–63	Teresa Weatherspoon (14)	Sue Wicks (7)	Teresa Weatherspoon (7)	Madison Square Garden	16–13
30	August 19	Washington	W 66–54	Tamika Whitmore (20)	Vickie Johnson (7)	Teresa Weatherspoon (8)	Madison Square Garden	17–13
31	August 19	Cleveland	W 72–55	Becky Hammon (16)	Sue Wicks (9)	Crystal Robinson (5)	Madison Square Garden	18–13
32	August 21	@ Cleveland	L 56–66	Johnson; Weatherspoon (15)	Sue Wicks (8)	Teresa Weatherspoon (5)	Gund Arena	18–14

1999 season schedule

=== Playoffs ===
1999 playoff game log
Conference Finals vs. Charlotte Sting
Won Series: 2–1

Game	Date	Team	Score	High points	High rebounds	High assists	Location Attendance	Record
1	August 27	@ Charlotte	L 67–78	Crystal Robinson (17)	Robinson; Wicks (6)	Teresa Weatherspoon (8)	Charlotte Coliseum	0–1
2	August 29	Charlotte	W 74–70	Teresa Weatherspoon (19)	Kym Hampton (10)	Teresa Weatherspoon (9)	Madison Square Garden	1–1
3	August 30	Charlotte	W 69–54	Crystal Robinson (18)	Kym Hampton (11)	Teresa Weatherspoon (11)	Madison Square Garden	2–1

Championship vs. Houston Comets
Lost Series: 1–2

Game	Date	Team	Score	High points	High rebounds	High assists	Location Attendance	Record
1	September 2	Houston	L 60–73	Sophia Witherspoon (18)	Sue Wicks (11)	Teresa Weatherspoon (10)	Madison Square Garden	0–1
2	September 4	@ Houston	W 68–67	Crystal Robinson (21)	Kym Hampton (9)	Teresa Weatherspoon (5)	Compaq Center	1–1
3	September 5	@ Houston	L 47–59	Sue Wicks (11)	Sue Wicks (9)	Crystal Robinson (3)	Compaq Center	1–2

1999 playoff schedule

=== Season standings ===
Eastern Conference	W	L	PCT	Conf.	GB
New York Liberty ^{x}	18	14	.563	12–8	–
Detroit Shock ^{x}	15	17	.469	12–8	3.0
Charlotte Sting ^{x}	15	17	.469	12–8	3.0
Orlando Miracle ^{o}	15	17	.469	9–11	3.0
Washington Mystics ^{o}	12	20	.375	10–10	6.0
Cleveland Rockers ^{o}	7	25	.219	5–15	11.0

== Statistics ==
Legend
GP	Games played	GS	Games started	MPG	Minutes per game	RPG	Rebounds per game
APG	Assists per game	SPG	Steals per game	BPG	Blocks per game	PPG	Points per game
FG%	Field-goal percentage	3P%	3-point field-goal percentage	FT%	Free-throw percentage	TO	Turnovers per game
PF	Fouls per game		Team leader		League leader

=== Regular season ===
Player	GP	GS	MPG	FG%	3P%	FT%	RPG	APG	SPG	BPG	PPG
Teresa Weatherspoon	32	32	33.9	.421	.378	.679	3.3	6.4	2.4	0.1	7.2
Vickie Johnson	32	32	33.8	.419	.352	.837	4.4	3.3	1.4	0.0	13.3
Sue Wicks	32	30	29.3	.403	.133	.615	7.0	1.4	1.3	1.3	6.8
Crystal Robinson	32	9	28.2	.439	.437	.845	2.8	1.5	1.4	0.3	11.7
Kym Hampton	32	32	26.8	.431	.500	.747	5.6	0.7	0.7	0.6	9.2
Tamika Whitmore	27	1	21.2	.435	.125	.679	3.6	0.7	0.6	0.2	7.9
Sophia Witherspoon	32	23	18.2	.396	.359	.710	1.5	1.2	1.0	0.1	8.5
Becky Hammon	30	0	6.7	.422	.289	.882	0.6	0.6	0.2	0.0	2.7
Venus Lacy	17	0	6.5	.417	N/A	.800	1.2	0.1	0.2	0.2	1.9
Michele Van Gorp	21	0	5.6	.333	N/A	.800	0.8	0.3	0.0	0.1	1.0
Coquese Washington	19	0	4.1	.278	.000	1.000	0.4	0.8	0.5	0.0	0.6
Rebecca Lobo	1	1	1.0	N/A	N/A	N/A	1.0	0.0	0.0	0.0	0.0

^{‡}Waived/Released during the season
^{†}Traded during the season
^{≠}Acquired during the season

== Awards and honors ==
- Teresa Weatherspoon, Guard, New York Liberty, All-WNBA Second Team
