= Richie Adubato =

American basketball coach (1937–2025)

- Adubato as coach of the Liberty

Personal information
- Born: November 23, 1937 Irvington, New Jersey, U.S.
- Died: November 6, 2025 (aged 87) Lake Mary, Florida, U.S.

Career information
- High school: Clifford Scott (East Orange, New Jersey)
- College: William Paterson
- Coaching career: 1969–2007

Career history

Coaching
- 1969–1972: Upsala College (assistant)
- 1972–1978: Upsala College
- 1978–1979: Detroit Pistons (assistant)
- 1979–1980: Detroit Pistons (interim)
- 1982–1986: New York Knicks (assistant)
- 1986–1989: Dallas Mavericks (assistant)
- 1989–1993: Dallas Mavericks
- 1993–1994: Cleveland Cavaliers (assistant)
- 1994–1997: Orlando Magic (assistant)
- 1997: Orlando Magic (interim)
- 1999–2004: New York Liberty
- 2005–2007: Washington Mystics

Career coaching record
- NBA: 127–240 (.346)
- WNBA: 134–116 (.536)
- Record at Basketball Reference

Richard Adam Adubato (November 23, 1937 – November 6, 2025) was an American basketball coach in the National Basketball Association and the Women's National Basketball Association. He served as head coach for three NBA teams, the Detroit Pistons, the Dallas Mavericks, and the Orlando Magic, and two WNBA teams, the New York Liberty and Washington Mystics.

== Early life and education ==
Born in Irvington, New Jersey, Adubato attended Clifford Scott High School, where he played on the school's baseball team, earning three state titles during his time at the school. He earned an athletic scholarship at Upsala College. He ultimately played both baseball and basketball at William Paterson University.

== Coaching career ==
Before his professional coaching career, he was basketball coach at Our Lady of the Valley High School in Orange, New Jersey, and of the Upsala Vikings men's basketball team.

Adubato was promoted from assistant to head coach of the Detroit Pistons on an interim basis upon the dismissal of Dick Vitale on November 8, 1979. His first game at the helm was a 106–98 Pistons win over the Philadelphia 76ers at the Pontiac Silverdome the following night on November 9.

He replaced Brian Hill halfway through the 1996–97 season and guided the Magic to a 21–12 record and made their fourth consecutive playoff appearance. The Magic then nearly upset Pat Riley's Miami Heat in the playoffs with the help of spectacular play from Penny Hardaway, but ultimately lost the series 3–2.

In 1999, Adubato became head coach for the New York Liberty of the Women's National Basketball Association, making his WNBA debut on June 10, 1999, when he guided the Liberty to an 87–60 victory over the defending Eastern Conference champion Cleveland Rockers. With the Liberty posting impressive attendance figures for the third straight season, Madison Square Garden played host to the first-ever WNBA All-Star Game - a sellout (18,649) - on July 14, 1999. Four Liberty players were selected to the Eastern Conference squad: Rebecca Lobo, Teresa Weatherspoon, Kym Hampton, and Vickie Johnson.

With Adubato at the helm, the Liberty posted an overall mark of 18-14 and won its first Eastern Conference title. After defeating the Charlotte Sting in the first round of the playoffs, the team faced a rematch with the defending WNBA champion Houston Comets. Despite falling short of the title, the series was pushed to a third game when Weatherspoon made the most famous shot in WNBA history—a half-court, buzzer-beating shot that won Game 2 before a stunned Houston squad and Compaq Center crowd.

Under Adubato, the Liberty went to the finals three out of four seasons and won the Eastern Conference regular-season championship three times.

Adubato took over as coach of the Washington Mystics, but left the Mystics on June 1, 2007, reportedly upset over his team's 0–4 start to the season, a number of recent transactions, and his contract status.

During his NBA coaching career, Adubato replaced Dick Vitale as head coach of the Detroit Pistons after 12 games of the 1979–80 season. He later was head coach of the Dallas Mavericks for 264 games between 1989 and 1992.

Adubato later served as the radio color analyst for the Orlando Magic.

Adubato was also an assistant NBA coach for the Cleveland Cavaliers, Dallas Mavericks, Detroit Pistons, New York Knicks, and Orlando Magic and an NBA scout for the Atlanta Hawks.

== Personal life and death ==
Adubato and his wife had three children and two grandchildren.

Adubato died on November 6, 2025, at the age of 87 at his home in Lake Mary, Florida.

== Head coaching record ==
=== NBA ===
Legend
| Regular season | G | Games coached | W | Games won | L | Games lost | W–L % | Win–loss % |
| Playoffs | PG | Playoff games | PW | Playoff wins | PL | Playoff losses | PW–L % | Playoff win–loss % |

| Team | Year | G | W | L | W–L% | Finish | PG | PW | PL | PW–L% | Result |
|---|---|---|---|---|---|---|---|---|---|---|---|
| Detroit | 1979–80 | 70 | 12 | 58 | .171 | 6th in Central | – | – | – | – | Missed Playoffs |
| Dallas | 1989–90 | 71 | 42 | 29 | .592 | 3rd in Midwest | 3 | 0 | 3 | .000 | Lost in First round |
| Dallas | 1990–91 | 82 | 28 | 54 | .341 | 6th in Midwest | – | – | – | – | Missed Playoffs |
| Dallas | 1991–92 | 82 | 22 | 60 | .268 | 5th in Midwest | – | – | – | – | Missed Playoffs |
| Dallas | 1992–93 | 29 | 2 | 27 | .069 | (fired) | – | – | – | – | – |
| Orlando | 1996–97 | 33 | 21 | 12 | .636 | 3rd in Atlantic | 5 | 2 | 3 | .400 | Lost in First round |
| Career | | 367 | 127 | 240 | .346 | | 8 | 2 | 6 | .250 | |

=== WNBA ===
Legend
| Regular season | G | Games coached | W | Games won | L | Games lost | W–L % | Win–loss % |
| Playoffs | PG | Playoff games | PW | Playoff wins | PL | Playoff losses | PW–L % | Playoff win–loss % |

| Team | Year | G | W | L | W–L% | Finish | PG | PW | PL | PW–L% | Result |
|---|---|---|---|---|---|---|---|---|---|---|---|
| New York | 1999 | 32 | 18 | 14 | .563 | 1st in East | 6 | 3 | 3 | .500 | Lost in WNBA Finals |
| New York | 2000 | 32 | 20 | 12 | .625 | 1st in East | 7 | 4 | 3 | .571 | Lost in WNBA Finals |
| New York | 2001 | 32 | 21 | 11 | .656 | 2nd in East | 6 | 3 | 3 | .500 | Lost in Conf. Finals |
| New York | 2002 | 32 | 18 | 14 | .563 | 1st in East | 8 | 4 | 4 | .500 | Lost in WNBA Finals |
| New York | 2003 | 34 | 16 | 18 | .471 | 6th in East | – | – | – | – | Missed Playoffs |
| New York | 2004 | 16 | 7 | 9 | .438 | (fired) | – | – | – | – | – |
| Washington | 2005 | 34 | 16 | 18 | .471 | 5th in East | – | – | – | – | Missed Playoffs |
| Washington | 2006 | 34 | 18 | 16 | .529 | 4th in East | 2 | 0 | 2 | .000 | Lost in First round |
| Washington | 2007 | 4 | 0 | 4 | .000 | (resigned) | – | – | – | – | – |
| Career | | 250 | 134 | 116 | .536 | | 29 | 14 | 15 | .483 | |
