= 1999 WNBA playoffs =

Professional women's basketball tournament

- Dates: August 24 – September 5, 1999

Final positions
- Champions: Houston Comets
- Runners-up: New York Liberty

Tournament statistics
- Scoring leader(s): Cynthia Cooper-Dyke (Houston) (122)

Awards
- MVP: Cynthia Cooper-Dyke (Houston)

The 1999 WNBA playoffs was the postseason for the Women's National Basketball Association's 1999 season which ended with the Western Conference champion Houston Comets beating the Eastern Conference champion New York Liberty, 2–1. Cynthia Cooper was named the MVP of the Finals. The Comets completed a three-peat.

== Regular season standings ==
Eastern Conference

Eastern Conference	W	L	PCT	Conf.	GB
New York Liberty ^{x}	18	14	.563	12–8	–
Detroit Shock ^{x}	15	17	.469	12–8	3.0
Charlotte Sting ^{x}	15	17	.469	12–8	3.0
Orlando Miracle ^{o}	15	17	.469	9–11	3.0
Washington Mystics ^{o}	12	20	.375	10–10	6.0
Cleveland Rockers ^{o}	7	25	.219	5–15	11.0

Western Conference

Western Conference	W	L	PCT	Conf.	GB
Houston Comets ^{x}	26	6	.813	16–4	–
Los Angeles Sparks ^{x}	20	12	.625	12–8	6.0
Sacramento Monarchs ^{x}	19	13	.594	9–11	7.0
Phoenix Mercury ^{o}	15	17	.469	7–13	11.0
Minnesota Lynx ^{o}	15	17	.469	8–12	11.0
Utah Starzz ^{o}	15	17	.469	8–12	11.0

Note: Teams with an "X" clinched playoff spots.

== Bracket ==
There were 12 teams in the league. For the playoffs, the three teams with the best record in each conference were seeded one to three. The top seeded team in each conference got a bye for the first round.

**Conference** **semifinals** single game
**Eastern**; **Conference**
E2	Detroit	54
E3	**Charlotte**	**60**
**Western**; **Conference**
W2	**Los Angeles**	**71**
W3	Sacramento	58

**Conference** **finals** Best-of-3
E1	**New York**	**2**
E3	Charlotte	1
W1	**Houston**	**2**
W2	Los Angeles	1

**WNBA Championship**; Best-of-3
E1	New York	1
W1	**Houston**	**2**

- **Bold** – Game or series winner
- Italics – Team with home-court advantage

== Conference semifinals ==
=== Charlotte Sting vs. Detroit Shock ===
August 24

Recap

**Charlotte Sting** **60**, Detroit Shock 54
Scoring by half: 22–26, 38–28
Pts: Andrea Stinson 16; Rebs: Andrea Stinson 14; Asts: Dawn Staley 5	Pts: Wendy Palmer 10; Rebs: Wendy Palmer 9 Asts: Jennifer Azzi 3

The Palace of Auburn Hills, Auburn Hills, Michigan
Attendance: 6,917
Referees: Michael Price, Bob Trammell, June Courteau

=== Sacramento Monarchs vs. Los Angeles Sparks ===
August 24

Recap

Sacramento Monarchs 58, **Los Angeles Sparks** **71**
Scoring by half: 32–21, 26–50
Pts: Ruthie Bolton-Holifield 15; Rebs: Latasha Byears 10; Asts: Ruthie Bolton-Holifield 4	Pts: Lisa Leslie 22; Rebs: Lisa Leslie 12; Asts: Gordana Grubin 9

Great Western Forum, Inglewood, California
Attendance: 8,569
Referees: Stan Gaxiola, Sally Bell, Jason Phillips

== Conference finals ==
=== Houston Comets vs. Los Angeles Sparks ===
August 26

Recap

Houston Comets 60, **Los Angeles Sparks** **75**
Scoring by half: 29–33, 31–42
Pts: Sheryl Swoopes 17; Rebs: Tina Thompson 7 Asts: Cynthia Cooper 7	Pts: Lisa Leslie 23; Rebs: Frett, Leslie 7 each Asts: Gordana Grubin 7
**Los Angeles leads series, 1–0**

Great Western Forum, Inglewood, California
Attendance: 10,099
Referees: Patty Broderick, Teresa Dahlem, Courtney Kirkland

August 29

Recap

Los Angeles Sparks 55, **Houston Comets** **83**
Scoring by half: 28–34, 27–49
Pts: Lisa Leslie 11; Rebs: Lisa Leslie 8 Asts: Lisa Leslie 4	Pts: Cynthia Cooper 22; Rebs: Tammy Jackson 10; Asts: Cynthia Cooper 9
**Series tied, 1–1**

Compaq Center, Houston, Texas
Attendance: 14,883
Referees: Gary Zielinski, Bill Stokes, Melissa Barlow

August 30

Recap

Los Angeles Sparks 62, **Houston Comets** **72**
Scoring by half: 38–35, 24–37
Pts: Lisa Leslie 20; Rebs: Leslie, Mabika 7 each Asts: Mwadi Mabika 5	Pts: Sheryl Swoopes 23; Rebs: Cynthia Cooper 7 Asts: Cynthia Cooper 12
**Houston wins series, 2–1**

Compaq Center, Houston, Texas
Attendance: 11,692
Referees: June Courteau, Lisa Mattingly, Michael Price

=== New York Liberty vs. Charlotte Sting ===
August 27

Recap

New York Liberty 67, **Charlotte Sting** **78**
Scoring by half: 36–33, 31–45
Pts: Crystal Robinson 17; Rebs: Robinson, Wicks 6 each Asts: Teresa Weatherspoon 8	Pts: Mapp, Staley, Stinson 16 each Rebs: Vicky Bullett 11; Asts: Dawn Staley 9
**Charlotte leads series, 1–0**

Charlotte Coliseum, Charlotte, North Carolina
Attendance: 10,840
Referees: Sally Bell, Derek Collins, Lisa Mattingly

August 29

Recap

Charlotte Sting 70, **New York Liberty** **74**
Scoring by half: 29–39, 41–35
Pts: Andrea Stinson 27; Rebs: Stinson, Mapp, Smith 6 each Asts: Andrea Stinson 4	Pts: Teresa Weatherspoon 19; Rebs: Kym Hampton 10; Asts: Teresa Weatherspoon 9
**Series tied, 1–1**

Madison Square Garden, New York City, New York
Attendance: 13,510
Referees: Stan Gaxiola, Karen Wilhite, Scott Yarbrough

August 30

Recap

Charlotte Sting 54, **New York Liberty** **69**
Scoring by half: 26–32, 28–37
Pts: Andrea Stinson 24; Rebs: Rhonda Mapp 6 Asts: Dawn Staley 6	Pts: Crystal Robinson 18; Rebs: Kym Hampton 11; Asts: Teresa Weatherspoon 11
**New York wins series, 2–1**

Madison Square Garden, New York City, New York
Attendance: 12,929
Referees: Jason Phillips, Patty Broderick, Bill Stokes

== WNBA Championship ==
September 2

Recap

**Houston Comets** **73**, New York Liberty 60
Scoring by half: 29–20, 44–40
Pts: Cynthia Cooper 29; Rebs: Tammy Jackson 8 Asts: Cynthia Cooper 6	Pts: Sophia Witherspoon 18; Rebs: Sue Wicks 11; Asts: Teresa Weatherspoon 10
**Houston leads series, 1–0**

Madison Square Garden, New York City, New York
Attendance: 17,113
Referees: Derek Collins, Gary Zielinski, Sally Bell

September 4

Recap

**New York Liberty** **68**, Houston Comets 67
Scoring by half: 23–37, 45–30
Pts: Crystal Robinson 21; Rebs: Kym Hampton 9 Asts: Teresa Weatherspoon 5	Pts: Tina Thompson 15; Rebs: Swoopes, Tzekova 6 each Asts: Cynthia Cooper 6
**Series tied, 1–1**

Compaq Center, Houston, Texas
Attendance: 16,285
Referees: June Courteau, Patty Broderick, Jason Phillips

September 5

Recap

New York Liberty 47, **Houston Comets** **59**
Scoring by half: 25–33, 22–26
Pts: Sue Wicks 11; Rebs: Sue Wicks 9 Asts: Crystal Robinson 3	Pts: Cynthia Cooper 24; Rebs: Tammy Jackson 11; Asts: Sonja Henning 2
**Houston wins series, 2–1**

Compaq Center, Houston, Texas
Attendance: 16,285
Referees: Sally Bell, Michael Price, Stan Gaxiola

== Aftermath ==
The two teams would meet each other again in the 2000 WNBA Finals.

== See also ==
- List of WNBA Champions
