= 1997 New York Liberty season =

- Head coach: Nancy Darsch
- Arena: Madison Square Garden

Results
- Record: 17–11 (.607)
- Place: 2nd (Eastern)
- Playoff finish: Lost WNBA Finals

The 1997 WNBA season was the first season for the New York Liberty.

== WNBA allocation draft ==
Player	Nationality	School/Team/Country
Rebecca Lobo	United States	UConn
Teresa Weatherspoon	United States	Louisiana Tech

== WNBA elite draft ==
Round	Pick	Player	Nationality	School/Team/Country
1	4	Kym Hampton	United States	Arizona State
2	12	Vickie Johnson	United States	Louisiana Tech

== WNBA draft ==
Round	Pick	Player	Nationality	School/Team/Country
1	6	Sue Wicks	United States	Rutgers
2	11	Sophia Witherspoon	United States	Florida
3	22	Trena Trice	United States	NC State
4	27	Kisha Ford	United States	Georgia Tech

== Transactions ==
Date	Transaction
January 22, 1997	Drafted Rebecca Lobo and Teresa Weatherspoon in the 1997 WNBA Allocation Draft
February 27, 1997	Drafted Kym Hampton and Vickie Johnson in the 1997 WNBA Elite Draft
April 19, 1997	Hired Nancy Darsch as Head Coach
April 28, 1997	Drafted Sue Wicks, Sophia Witherspoon, Trena Trice and Kisha Ford in the 1997 WNBA draft
August 11, 1997	Waived Jasmina Perazić-Gipe

== Roster ==
1997 New York Liberty roster
Players
Coaches

Pos.	No.	Nat.	Name	Height	Weight	DOB	From	Yrs
G	10	(United States)	Blades, Rhonda	5' 7" (1.7m)	138 lb (63kg)	1972-10-29	Vanderbilt	R
G	22	(United States)	Crumpton-Moorer, Cassandra	5' 11" (1.8m)	175 lb (79kg)	1962-10-29	Alabama	R
G/F	5	(United States)	Ford, Kisha	5' 10" (1.78m)	153 lb (69kg)	1975-04-04	Georgia Tech	R
C	34	(United States)	Hampton, Kym	6' 2" (1.88m)	210 lb (95kg)	1962-11-03	Arizona State	R
G/F	55	(United States)	Johnson, Vickie	5' 9" (1.75m)	150 lb (68kg)	1972-04-15	Louisiana Tech	R
C	50	(United States)	Lobo, Rebecca	6' 4" (1.93m)	185 lb (84kg)	1973-10-06	Connecticut	R
G/F	13	(Socialist Federal Republic of Yugoslavia)	Perazić-Gipe, Jasmina	6' 0" (1.83m)		1960-12-06	Maryland	R
F/C	33	(United States)	Trice, Trena	6' 2" (1.88m)	180 lb (82kg)	1965-08-04	NC State	R
G	11	(United States)	Weatherspoon, Teresa	5' 8" (1.73m)	161 lb (73kg)	1965-12-08	Louisiana Tech	R
F	23	(United States)	Wicks, Sue	6' 3" (1.91m)	174 lb (79kg)	1966-11-26	Rutgers	R
G/F	13	(United States)	Witherspoon, Sophia	5' 10" (1.78m)	145 lb (66kg)	1969-07-06	Florida	R

Head coach
(United States) Nancy Darsch (Tennessee)
Assistant coaches
(United States) Melissa McFerrin
(United States) Lisa White

Legend

- (C) Team captain
- (DP) Unsigned draft pick
- (FA) Free agent
- (S) Suspended
- Injured

== Schedule ==
=== Regular season ===
1997 game log
Total: 17–11 (Home: 10–5; Road: 7–6)
June: 4–0 (Home: 1–0; Road: 3–0)

Game	Date	Team	Score	High points	High rebounds	High assists	Location Attendance	Record
1	June 21	@ Los Angeles	W 67–57	Rebecca Lobo (16)	Vickie Johnson (8)	Teresa Weatherspoon (10)	Great Western Forum	1–0
2	June 23	@ Sacramento	W 73–62	Sophia Witherspoon (15)	Rebecca Lobo (9)	Vickie Johnson (3)	ARCO Arena	2–0
3	June 26	@ Houston	W 62–60 (OT)	Hampton; Johnson; Lobo (10)	Rebecca Lobo (8)	Kisha Ford (4)	The Summit	3–0
4	June 29	Phoenix	W 65–57	Vickie Johnson (20)	Rebecca Lobo (9)	Teresa Weatherspoon (5)	Madison Square Garden	4–0

July : 10–4 (Home: 6–2; Road: 4–2)

Game	Date	Team	Score	High points	High rebounds	High assists	Location Attendance	Record
5	July 2	Houston	W 72–67	Sophia Witherspoon (14)	Kym Hampton (9)	Teresa Weatherspoon (6)	Madison Square Garden	5–0
6	July 4	@ Houston	W 65–58	Sophia Witherspoon (21)	Rebecca Lobo (11)	Teresa Weatherspoon (6)	The Summit	6–0
7	July 5	@ Utah	W 66–53	Sophia Witherspoon (14)	Teresa Weatherspoon (11)	Teresa Weatherspoon (5)	Delta Center	7–0
8	July 7	@ Phoenix	L 50–69	Vickie Johnson (11)	Sophia Witherspoon (6)	Teresa Weatherspoon (5)	America West Arena	7–1
9	July 9	@ Charlotte	L 69–87	Vickie Johnson (14)	Rebecca Lobo (8)	Teresa Weatherspoon (7)	Charlotte Coliseum	7–2
10	July 10	Charlotte	W 62–48	Rebecca Lobo (16)	Rebecca Lobo (11)	Teresa Weatherspoon (7)	Madison Square Garden	8–2
11	July 14	@ Cleveland	W 68–57	Rebecca Lobo (18)	Rebecca Lobo (8)	Teresa Weatherspoon (5)	Gund Arena	9–2
12	July 15	Cleveland	W 76–59	Sophia Witherspoon (16)	Lobo; Wicks (8)	Teresa Weatherspoon (8)	Madison Square Garden	10–2
13	July 17	Utah	W 80–54	Rebecca Lobo (17)	Kym Hampton (9)	Teresa Weatherspoon (7)	Madison Square Garden	11–2
14	July 19	Los Angeles	W 69–57	Sophia Witherspoon (24)	Kym Hampton (9)	Rebecca Lobo (5)	Madison Square Garden	12–2
15	July 22	Utah	L 71–78	Sophia Witherspoon (16)	Kym Hampton (7)	Teresa Weatherspoon (6)	Madison Square Garden	12–3
16	July 23	@ Charlotte	W 65–63	Rebecca Lobo (17)	Rebecca Lobo (4)	Vickie Johnson (6)	Charlotte Coliseum	13–3
17	July 26	Charlotte	L 61–64	Sophia Witherspoon (21)	Rebecca Lobo (11)	Teresa Weatherspoon (7)	Madison Square Garden	13–4
18	July 30	Sacramento	W 73–68	Sophia Witherspoon (26)	Rebecca Lobo (12)	Teresa Weatherspoon (10)	Madison Square Garden	14–4

August : 3–7 (Home: 3–3; Road: 0–4)

Game	Date	Team	Score	High points	High rebounds	High assists	Location Attendance	Record
19	August 2	Phoenix	W 80–70	Sophia Witherspoon (20)	Kym Hampton (10)	Vickie Johnson (6)	Madison Square Garden	15–4
20	August 5	Los Angeles	L 50–67	Hampton; Witherspoon (12)	Rebecca Lobo (10)	Johnson; Weatherspoon (3)	Madison Square Garden	15–5
21	August 11	@ Sacramento	L 69–76	Kym Hampton (17)	Kym Hampton (6)	Teresa Weatherspoon (6)	ARCO Arena	15–6
22	August 12	@ Phoenix	L 67–77	Kym Hampton (14)	Kym Hampton (11)	Teresa Weatherspoon (8)	America West Arena	15–7
23	August 15	Sacramento	W 79–63	Sophia Witherspoon (21)	Kym Hampton (8)	Teresa Weatherspoon (8)	Madison Square Garden	16–7
24	August 17	Houston	L 55–70	Rebecca Lobo (13)	Johnson; Lobo (6)	Teresa Weatherspoon (5)	Madison Square Garden	16–8
25	August 19	@ Utah	L 75–81	Rebecca Lobo (27)	Rebecca Lobo (9)	Teresa Weatherspoon (5)	Delta Center	16–9
26	August 20	@ Los Angeles	L 76–78	Sophia Witherspoon (27)	Johnson; Wicks (5)	Teresa Weatherspoon (12)	Great Western Forum	16–10
27	August 23	@ Cleveland	L 71–72	Trena Trice (17)	Kym Hampton (9)	Johnson; Weatherspoon (5)	Gund Arena	16–11
28	August 24	Cleveland	W 79–72 (OT)	Kym Hampton (21)	Rebecca Lobo (7)	Teresa Weatherspoon (8)	Madison Square Garden	17–11

1997 season schedule

=== Playoffs ===
1997 playoff game log
Semifinal vs. Phoenix Mercury

Game	Date	Team	Score	High points	High rebounds	High assists	Location Attendance	Series
1	August 28	@ Phoenix	W 59–41	Rebecca Lobo (16)	Kym Hampton (14)	Teresa Weatherspoon (5)	America West Arena	1–0

Championship vs. Houston Comets

Game	Date	Team	Score	High points	High rebounds	High assists	Location Attendance	Series
1	August 30	New York	L 51–65	Kym Hampton (13)	Kym Hampton (13)	Teresa Weatherspoon (5)	The Summit	1–0

1997 playoff schedule

=== Season standings ===
Eastern Conference	W	L	PCT	Conf.	GB
Houston Comets ^{x}	18	10	.643	6–6	–
New York Liberty ^{x}	17	11	.607	8–4	1.0
Charlotte Sting ^{x}	15	13	.536	5–7	3.0
Cleveland Rockers ^{o}	15	13	.536	5–7	3.0

== Statistics ==
Legend
GP	Games played	GS	Games started	MPG	Minutes per game	RPG	Rebounds per game
APG	Assists per game	SPG	Steals per game	BPG	Blocks per game	PPG	Points per game
FG%	Field-goal percentage	3P%	3-point field-goal percentage	FT%	Free-throw percentage	TO	Turnovers per game
PF	Fouls per game		Team leader		League leader

=== Regular season ===
Player	GP	GS	MPG	FG%	3P%	FT%	RPG	APG	SPG	BPG	PPG
Rebecca Lobo	28	28	33.5	.376	.286	.610	7.3	1.9	0.9	1.8	12.4
Teresa Weatherspoon	28	28	33.0	.467	.086	.650	4.1	6.2	3.0	0.1	7.0
Sophia Witherspoon	28	28	31.0	.406	.349	.748	3.0	2.3	1.8	0.3	14.5
Vickie Johnson	26	25	30.3	.404	.190	.771	4.2	2.5	0.7	0.2	9.6
Kym Hampton	28	28	23.7	.474	.000	.640	5.8	1.4	1.4	0.7	9.8
Kisha Ford	28	3	16.9	.377	.150	.614	1.7	0.9	1.0	0.2	4.1
Trena Trice	28	0	12.1	.554	.250	.667	2.4	0.1	0.3	0.3	4.8
Sue Wicks	28	0	11.9	.355	.286	.667	3.4	1.0	0.6	0.6	3.6
Rhonda Blades	28	0	10.4	.357	.315	.650	0.8	1.1	0.5	0.0	2.9
Cassandra Crumpton-Moorer	2	0	5.5	.250	.000	N/A	1.0	0.5	0.0	0.0	1.0
Jasmina Perazić-Gipe	9	0	5.2	.385	.000	N/A	1.2	0.4	0.3	0.0	1.1

^{‡}Waived/Released during the season
^{†}Traded during the season
^{≠}Acquired during the season

- Kym Hampton ranked tenth in the WNBA in total rebounds with 163
- Kym Hampton ranked tenth in the WNBA in blocks with 19.
- Kym Hampton ranked fifth in the WNBA in Field Goal Percentage (.471)
- Rebecca Lobo ranked fourth in the WNBA in blocks with 51.
- Rebecca Lobo ranked fourth in the WNBA in total rebounds with 203.
- Rebecca Lobo ranked eighth in the WNBA in minutes per game with 33.5 minutes per game.
- Sophia Witherspoon ranked seventh in the WNBA in points with 407 points.
- Sophia Witherspoon ranked ninth in the WNBA in field goals with 140.
- Sophia Witherspoon ranked seventh in the WNBA in points per game with 14.5
- Sophia Witherspoon was tied for tenth in the WNBA in steals with 49.
- Teresa Weatherspoon ranked tenth in the WNBA in minutes per game with 33.0 minutes.

== Awards and honors ==
- Rebecca Lobo, Forward, All-WNBA Second Team
- Teresa Weatherspoon, Guard, All-WNBA Second Team

- Teresa Weatherspoon: Led WNBA, Assists, 172
- Teresa Weatherspoon: Led WNBA, Steals, 85
- Teresa Weatherspoon: Led WNBA, Assists per game, 6.1
- Teresa Weatherspoon: Led WNBA, Steals per game, 3.0
