= Crystal Robinson =

American basketball coach and player (born 1974)

Personal information
- Born: January 22, 1974 (age 52)
- Listed height: 5 ft 11 in (1.80 m)
- Listed weight: 180 lb (82 kg)

Career information
- High school: Atoka (Atoka, Oklahoma)
- College: Southeastern Oklahoma State (1992–1996)
- WNBA draft: 1999: 1st round, 6th overall pick
- Drafted by: New York Liberty
- Playing career: 1996–2007
- Position: Forward / guard
- Number: 17
- Coaching career: 2007–present

Career history

Playing
- 1996–1998: Colorado Xplosion
- 1999–2005: New York Liberty
- 2004–2005: Elitzur Ramla
- 2005–2006: Spartak Moscow
- 2006–2007: Washington Mystics

Coaching
- 2007–2008: Washington Mystics (assistant)
- 2009–2010: McAlester HS
- 2010–2013: Murray State CC
- 2013–2014: Utah State (assistant)
- 2014–2015: TCU (assistant)
- 2015–2016: Atoka HS
- 2018: Seattle Storm (assistant)
- 2019–2020: Dallas Wings (assistant)
- 2022: Phoenix Mercury (assistant)
- 2024: Chicago Sky (assistant)
- 2026: Langston University (head coach)

Career highlights
- As player: MAAC Tournament MVP (1997) As coach: WNBA champion (2018)
- Stats at Basketball Reference

Crystal LaTresa Robinson (born January 22, 1974) is an American basketball coach and former player. She is the current head coach at Oklahoma's only HBCU, Langston University. She grew up in Atoka, Oklahoma, and first garnered national recognition during her collegiate career at Southeastern Oklahoma State University. Professionally, Robinson played for the Colorado Xplosion of the ABL before playing in the WNBA for the New York Liberty and Washington Mystics.

After retiring from playing basketball, Robinson first became an assistant coach for the Washington Mystics in 2007, then became head coach at McAlester High School in 2009, leading the Lady Buffaloes to a 5A state championship, and at the junior college level at Murray State College in Oklahoma in 2010. Robinson moved to the Division I ranks in 2013, as an assistant coach at Utah State in 2013–14 and TCU in 2014–15, before returning to her alma mater to coach girls' basketball at Atoka High School.

== High school ==
Robinson was raised in Atoka, Oklahoma and attended Atoka High School, where she was named a High School All-American by the WBCA. She participated in the inaugural WBCA High School All-America Game in 1992, scoring a game-high twenty-five points, and earning MVP honors.

== College ==
Considered by most to be the best player to ever come out of Oklahoma, Robinson signed with NCAA power Louisiana Tech out of Atoka High School, but later decided she wanted to be closer to home and transferred to Southeastern Oklahoma State University in Durant, OK before playing a single game in Louisiana. Robinson went on to earn her bachelor's degree in health, physical education and recreation.

She averaged 26.9 ppg, 10.4 rpg and six apg during her collegiate career and is the all-time Southeastern leader in points, rebounds, assists, and steals. She scored a career-high 60 points against rival East Central in her senior year, which remains the most point scored in a game in the history of Oklahoma women's basketball.

Robinson was a three-time NAIA first-team All-American, who led the nation in scoring in 1994 and '95 and was named the NAIA Women's Basketball National Player of the Year in 1996, after leading Southeastern to NAIA runner-up finishes in 1995 and '96, dropping a pair of one-point decisions in back-to-back championship games to Southern Nazarene. Despite losing in the NAIA championship game in 1995 and '96, both years Robinson was named the NAIA Women's Basketball National Tournament MVP and still holds the NAIA career national tournament record for points score with 177.

C-Rob rewrote the Southeastern record book in her three seasons in a Savages uniform from 1993 to 1996, ranking in the top ten in all but one statistical category (Field Goal Percentage in a season). Robinson is SE's all-time career leader in points (3,023), rebounds (1,165), assists (547), and steals (376), while ranking second in career blocks (162). Robinson is also the school's all-time leader for points in a season (1,032), scoring average in a season (30.4), field goals made (377) in a season, three-point field goals made in a season (116), rebounds (420) in a season, assists in a season (191), steals in a season (130).

Robinson also hit one of the more amazing shots ever, in the 1995 national semi-final game against Lipscomb (Tenn.), banking in a game-winning 3-pointer at the buzzer while parallel to the floor and draped by three defenders.

Crystal Robinson has been inducted into the Southeastern Athletic Hall of Fame, NAIA Hall of Fame (joining Kelly Litsch of Southwestern Oklahoma State University and Jo Metzger of Western Washington University and becoming just the third women's basketball player inducted into the NAIA Hall of Fame), and the Jim Thorpe Oklahoma Hall of Fame. She was also chosen to The Daily Oklahoman All-Century First Team for both Oklahoma high schools and Oklahoma universities.

== Professional career ==
Robinson began her professional career in 1996–97, playing for the Colorado Xplosion in the American Basketball League. She was named the ABL Rookie of the Year, which she says is the award in her playing career she is most proud, and an ABL All-Star in 1997.

After the ABL abruptly folded in December 1998, Robinson was selected 6th overall in the 1999 WNBA draft by the New York Liberty. She played seven years for the franchise and - alongside WNBA great Teresa Weatherspoon and all-stars Tari Phillips, Sue Wicks and Becky Hammon - and helped the Liberty to four-straight WNBA Playoff berths and three WNBA Finals. Robinson averaged 10.2 ppg, 2.7 rpg and 1.1 spg over 30.1 mpg during her eight-year WNBA career. In her first WNBA season, C-Rob led the WNBA in three-pointers made with 76 while her .437 shooting percentage from beyond the arc ranked her fourth in the league. She led the team in scoring eight times and recorded three 20+ scoring games, leading the Liberty past the Charlotte Sting in the Eastern Conference Finals (2–1) before falling to the Houston Comets (2–1) in the 1999 WNBA Finals.

In 2000, Robinson was top scoring threat both as a starter and off the bench as she helped lead the Liberty to the top seed in the Eastern Conference playoffs. She hit double figures in scoring 13 times, including five consecutive games from June 23 to July 1. That year the Liberty swept the fourth-seeded Washington Mystics in the first round of the playoffs and defeated the second-seeded Cleveland Rockers (2–1) in the Conference Finals before falling in the 2000 WNBA Finals to the Houston Comets.

In 2001, Robinson turned in another solid campaign starting all 32 games and authored 19 double-figure scoring games. She averaged 11.5 ppg in the playoffs that season (16th on WNBA Playoff leader board), leading the team to an opening round sweep of Miami before being eliminated by the Charlotte Rockers in the Eastern Conference Finals (2–1).

In 2002, Robinson started all 32 games and helped the Liberty back to the championship series for the third time in four seasons where they fell to the Los Angeles Sparks in the 2002 WNBA Finals. She recorded her 1,000th career point on June 2 vs. Miami, scored in double-figures 21 times, led team in scoring nine times, and hit at least one shot from downtown in 27 of 32 games.

In 2003, Robinson had a career-high in points per game (12.0) while starting 33 of the Liberty's 34 games. She recorded 1,500th career point on July 15 vs. Washington and led team in scoring 10 times, ranking second on team in steals (40), and fourth in assists (63). C-Rob scored in double figures 21 times, including four consecutive 10-or-more point games and four 20+ point games. But the Liberty (16–18) finished sixth in the east and failed to make the playoffs for only the second time in franchise history that year. In 2004, Robinson started all but one of the Liberty's 28 games and finished with 12.1 points and 3.1 rebounds per game on .437 shooting from the floor and .930 from the free throw line. She recorded 2,000th career point vs. Connecticut on September 10, as the Liberty finished the regular season (18–16) in a tie for first place in the conference standings with the Connecticut Sun who they would eventually fall to in the Eastern Conference Finals. Robinson's shooting percentage (30.3%) and scoring (7.3 ppg) dropped to career lows in her final season with the Liberty in 2005, as Robinson battled some nagging injuries. She recorded 500th career rebound on May 26, versus Indiana and the Liberty earned the three-seed in the 2005 WNBA season but were swept by Indiana Fever in the opening round of the playoffs.

In the 2005–06 Euroleague season, Robinson played for Spartak Moscow of the Russian Women's Basketball Premier League. Averaging 9.5 points and 3.2 rebounds, Robinson helped Spartak Moscow earn the FIBA EuroCup title.

On February 8, 2006, Robinson signed with the Washington Mystics and played her final two seasons of professional basketball in our nation's capital. She appeared in 29 games in 2006 and 2007 before her retirement. After appearing in just two games during the 2007 season, she became an assistant coach for the Washington Mystics.

== Coaching career ==
Robinson announced her retirement on June 1, 2007, to become an assistant coach with the Washington Mystics.

After coaching with the Washington Mystics, she went back to Oklahoma to coach high school girls basketball for the McAlester High School Lady Buffaloes for a single season, where she guided the Lady Buffs to a 5A Oklahoma State title in her only season as head coach.

On December 23, 2009, she became the women's basketball head coach at Murray State College, a junior college in Tishomingo, Oklahoma, effective in the 2010–11 season. The Murray State Lady Aggies had an overall record of 79–37 under her watch.

In May 2013, Robinson joined Jerry Finkbeiner's staff at Utah State where she stayed for one season. The following season, Robinson was an assistant at TCU under Raegan Pebley.

In January 2018, she was hired as an assistant coach for the Seattle Storm, and went on to win the 2018 WNBA championship with the team.

In February 2019, she was hired as an assistant coach with the Dallas Wings under coach Brian Agler.

In March 2022, she was hired as an assistant coach for the Phoenix Mercury under coach Vanessa Nygaard.

In February 2024, she was hired as an assistant coach for the Chicago Sky under coach Teresa Weatherspoon.

== WNBA career statistics ==
Legend
GP	Games played	GS	Games started	MPG	Minutes per game	RPG	Rebounds per game
APG	Assists per game	SPG	Steals per game	BPG	Blocks per game	PPG	Points per game
TO	Turnovers per game	FG%	Field-goal percentage	3P%	3-point field-goal percentage	FT%	Free-throw percentage
**Bold**	Career best	°	League leader

=== Regular season ===
Year	Team	GP	GS	MPG	FG%	3P%	FT%	RPG	APG	SPG	BPG	TO	PPG
1999	New York	32	9	28.2	43.9	**43.7**	84.5	2.8	1.5	1.4	0.3	1.4	11.7
2000	New York	27	14	26.7	42.8	35.3	90.9	2.5	1.8	0.9	0.4	1.2	8.8
2001	New York	32	32	30.6	**46.1**	41.7	89.7	2.9	**2.6**	1.0	0.3	0.9	10.7
2002	New York	32	32	**33.4**	41.7	37.0	81.9	2.8	2.5	**1.5**	0.4	1.6	11.8
2003	New York	**33**	**33**	32.7	43.9	36.9	83.9	2.1	1.9	1.2	0.4	1.3	12.0
2004	New York	28	27	31.8	43.7	38.2	**93.0**	3.0	2.1	0.9	0.3	1.2	**12.1**
2005	New York	32	31	30.3	37.9	31.8	78.9	**3.1**	1.8	0.7	0.2	1.2	7.3
2006	Washington	27	27	26.8	40.2	28.3	80.6	2.6	1.8	1.2	0.0	1.0	7.4
2007	Washington	2	2	22.0	16.7	0.0	0.0	1.0	1.0	1.0	**0.5**	**0.5**	1.0
Career	9 years, 2 teams	245	207	30.1	42.7	37.4	85.0	2.7	2.0	1.1	0.3	1.2	10.2

=== Playoffs ===
Year	Team	GP	GS	MPG	FG%	3P%	FT%	RPG	APG	SPG	BPG	TO	PPG
1999	New York	6	6	34.2	**50.0**	38.5	100.0	3.0	2.2	1.0	0.3	1.7	14.3
2000	New York	7	0	21.4	41.0	**47.4**	100.0	2.9	0.7	1.3	0.1	1.4	6.6
2001	New York	6	6	**37.2**	**50.0**	41.4	75.0	3.8	1.3	1.3	0.3	2.3	11.5
2002	New York	**8**	**8**	32.4	35.4	30.8	100.0	3.0	1.8	1.0	0.3	0.6	8.4
2004	New York	5	5	35.0	**50.0**	39.4	80.0	3.2	2.6	**1.8**	0.4	1.6	**15.0**
2005	New York	2	2	25.0	15.4	14.3	100.0	**4.0**	2.0	0.5	**0.5**	**0.5**	3.5
2006	Washington	2	0	18.5	37.5	40.0	0.0	2.0	**4.5**	0.0	0.0	**0.5**	4.0
Career	7 years, 2 teams	36	27	30.5	43.9	37.4	93.8	3.1	1.8	1.1	0.3	1.4	9.9
