= Albena Branzova =

Bulgarian basketball player (born 1971)

Albena Branzova-Dimitrova
Personal information
- Born: 17 July 1971 (age 55) Burgas, Bulgaria
- Listed height: 1.93 m (6 ft 4 in)

Career information
- College: FIU (1991–1995)
- WNBA draft: 1998: 3rd round, 29th overall pick
- Drafted by: New York Liberty
- Playing career: 1995–2010
- Position: Center

Career history
- 1995–1997: Strasbourg Alsace
- 1998: New York Liberty
- 1999–2000: Elitzur Ramla
- 1999–2000: Botaş SK
- 2000–2001: Santo Andre
- 2001–2002: A.S. Ramat-Hasharon
- 2002–2006: MiZo Pécs
- 2006–2008: UNIQA Euroleasing Sopron
- 2008–2009: Nadezhda Orenburg
- 2009–2010: Tours Val de Loire Basket

Career highlights
- Conference USA Player of the Year (1995); 3x First-team All-Conference USA (1993–1995)
- Stats at Basketball Reference

Albena Boytcheva Branzova-Dimitrova (Bulgarian: Албена Брънзова-Димитрова) (born 17 July 1971) is a former Bulgarian female basketball player.

== Career statistics ==
Legend
GP	Games played	GS	Games started	MPG	Minutes per game	RPG	Rebounds per game
APG	Assists per game	SPG	Steals per game	BPG	Blocks per game	PPG	Points per game
TO	Turnovers per game	FG%	Field-goal percentage	3P%	3-point field-goal percentage	FT%	Free-throw percentage
**Bold**	Career best	°	League leader

=== WNBA ===
Year	Team	GP	GS	MPG	FG%	3P%	FT%	RPG	APG	SPG	BPG	TO	PPG
1998	New York	11	0	8.5	.360	.500	.750	1.5	.5	.3	.1	1.1	2.1
