= 1998 New York Liberty season =

- Head coach: Nancy Darsch
- Arena: Madison Square Garden

Results
- Record: 18–12 (.600)
- Place: 3rd (Eastern)
- Playoff finish: Did not qualify

The 1998 WNBA season was the second for the New York Liberty. The Liberty finished with an 18–12 mark, but they missed the playoffs after losing a tiebreaker to the Charlotte Sting.

== Transactions ==
=== Detroit Shock expansion draft ===
The following player was selected in the Detroit Shock expansion draft from the New York Liberty:

Player	Nationality	School/Team/Country
Rhonda Blades	United States	Vanderbilt

== WNBA draft ==
Round	Pick	Player	Nationality	School/Team/Country
1	9	Alicia Thompson	United States	Texas Tech
2	19	Nadine Domond	United States	Iowa
3	29	Albena Branzova	Bulgaria	FIU
4	39	Vanessa Nygaard	United States	Stanford

== Transactions ==
Date	Transaction
February 18, 1998	Lost Rhonda Blades to the Detroit Shock in the WNBA expansion draft
April 29, 1998	Drafted Alicia Thompson, Nadine Domond, Albena Branzova and Vanessa Nygaard in the 1998 WNBA draft
May 18, 1998	Waived Simone Edwards
June 3, 1998	Waived Cassandra Crumpton-Moorer
June 8, 1998	Waived Nadine Domond
July 14, 1998	Waived Albena Branzova

== Roster ==
1998 New York Liberty roster
Players
Coaches

Pos.	No.	Nat.	Name	Height	Weight	DOB	From	Yrs
F	31	(People's Republic of Bulgaria)	Branzova, Albena	6' 4" (1.93m)		1971-07-17	FIU	R
C	14	(Francoist Spain)	Cebrian, Elisabeth	6' 5" (1.96m)	190 lb (86kg)	1971-02-07		R
G/F	5	(United States)	Ford, Kisha	5' 10" (1.78m)	153 lb (69kg)	1975-04-04	Georgia Tech	1
C	34	(United States)	Hampton, Kym	6' 2" (1.88m)	210 lb (95kg)	1962-11-03	Arizona State	1
G/F	55	(United States)	Johnson, Vickie	5' 9" (1.75m)	150 lb (68kg)	1972-04-15	Louisiana Tech	1
C	50	(United States)	Lobo, Rebecca	6' 4" (1.93m)	185 lb (84kg)	1973-10-06	Connecticut	1
F	43	(United States)	Thompson, Alicia	6' 1" (1.85m)	180 lb (82kg)	1976-06-30	Texas Tech	R
F/C	33	(United States)	Trice, Trena	6' 2" (1.88m)	180 lb (82kg)	1965-08-04	NC State	1
G	4	(United States)	Washington, Coquese	5' 6" (1.68m)	138 lb (63kg)	1971-01-17	Notre Dame	R
G	11	(United States)	Weatherspoon, Teresa	5' 8" (1.73m)	161 lb (73kg)	1965-12-08	Louisiana Tech	1
F	23	(United States)	Wicks, Sue	6' 3" (1.91m)	174 lb (79kg)	1966-11-26	Rutgers	1
G/F	13	(United States)	Witherspoon, Sophia	5' 10" (1.78m)	145 lb (66kg)	1969-07-06	Florida	1

Head coach
(United States) Nancy Darsch (Tennessee)
Assistant coaches
(United States) Melissa McFerrin
(United States) Pat Coyle

Legend

- (C) Team captain
- (DP) Unsigned draft pick
- (FA) Free agent
- (S) Suspended
- Injured

== Schedule ==
=== Regular season ===
1998 game log
Total: 17–11 (Home: 10–5; Road: 7–6)
June: 5–4 (Home: 4–0; Road: 1–4)

Game	Date	Team	Score	High points	High rebounds	High assists	Location Attendance	Record
1	June 11	@ Cleveland	L 71–78	Sophia Witherspoon (19)	Rebecca Lobo (7)	Teresa Weatherspoon (5)	Gund Arena	0–1
2	June 13	@ Houston	L 62–73	Vickie Johnson (18)	Teresa Weatherspoon (6)	Teresa Weatherspoon (7)	Compaq Center	0–2
3	June 15	@ Utah	L 60–71	Vickie Johnson (19)	Hampton; Witherspoon (8)	Teresa Weatherspoon (9)	Delta Center	0–3
4	June 18	@ Sacramento	W 64–48	Teresa Weatherspoon (13)	Rebecca Lobo (8)	Teresa Weatherspoon (6)	ARCO Arena	1–3
5	June 19	@ Los Angeles	L 75–78	Sophia Witherspoon (18)	Kym Hampton (9)	Teresa Weatherspoon (5)	Great Western Forum	1–4
6	June 21	Utah	W 68–64	Kym Hampton (22)	Kym Hampton (10)	Teresa Weatherspoon (8)	Madison Square Garden	2–4
7	June 23	Cleveland	W 59–57	Vickie Johnson (27)	Hampton; Lobo (8)	Lobo; Weatherspoon (5)	Madison Square Garden	3–4
8	June 26	Sacramento	W 62–48	Kym Hampton (13)	Johnson; Lobo (7)	Teresa Weatherspoon (4)	Madison Square Garden	4–4
9	June 29	Phoenix	W 71–68	Johnson; Witherspoon (23)	Teresa Weatherspoon (10)	Teresa Weatherspoon (8)	Madison Square Garden	5–4

July : 7–5 (Home: 3–2; Road: 4–3)

Game	Date	Team	Score	High points	High rebounds	High assists	Location Attendance	Record
10	July 1	@ Detroit	L 65–82	Sophia Witherspoon (13)	Kym Hampton (8)	Teresa Weatherspoon (6)	The Palace of Auburn Hills	5–5
11	July 3	Washington	W 76–60	Teresa Weatherspoon (14)	Hampton; Lobo (6)	Johnson; Weatherspoon (6)	Madison Square Garden	6–5
12	July 5	@ Washington	W 62–61	Kym Hampton (17)	Rebecca Lobo (13)	Teresa Weatherspoon (5)	MCI Center	7–5
13	July 6	Detroit	W 59–56	Teresa Weatherspoon (12)	Teresa Weatherspoon (7)	Teresa Weatherspoon (4)	Madison Square Garden	8–5
14	July 8	Houston	L 54–79	Rebecca Lobo (14)	Hampton; Lobo (4)	Teresa Weatherspoon (6)	Madison Square Garden	8–6
15	July 12	Charlotte	L 57–75	Kym Hampton (12)	Kym Hampton (9)	Teresa Weatherspoon (5)	Madison Square Garden	8–7
16	July 15	@ Charlotte	L 65–72	Sophia Witherspoon (17)	Kym Hampton (12)	Teresa Weatherspoon (6)	Charlotte Coliseum	8–8
17	July 16	@ Cleveland	L 51–60	Sophia Witherspoon (13)	Kym Hampton (10)	Teresa Weatherspoon (6)	Gund Arena	8–9
18	July 18	@ Phoenix	W 69–63	Sophia Witherspoon (24)	Sophia Witherspoon (6)	Teresa Weatherspoon (5)	America West Arena	9–9
19	July 21	@ Los Angeles	W 92–77	Vickie Johnson (17)	Teresa Weatherspoon (7)	Teresa Weatherspoon (13)	Great Western Forum	10–9
20	July 24	@ Sacramento	W 76–54	Sophia Witherspoon (15)	Rebecca Lobo (8)	Teresa Weatherspoon (10)	ARCO Arena	11–9
21	July 26	Detroit	W 78–62	Sophia Witherspoon (17)	Rebecca Lobo (10)	Teresa Weatherspoon (9)	Madison Square Garden	12–9

August : 5–4 (Home: 4–2; Road: 1–2)

Game	Date	Team	Score	High points	High rebounds	High assists	Location Attendance	Record
22	August 1	@ Washington	W 67–53	Rebecca Lobo (13)	Kym Hampton (8)	Teresa Weatherspoon (6)	MCI Center	13–9
23	August 2	Charlotte	W 85–67	Johnson; Witherspoon (18)	Lobo; Wicks (6)	Teresa Weatherspoon (5)	Madison Square Garden	14–9
24	August 5	@ Charlotte	L 61–69	Vickie Johnson (21)	Rebecca Lobo (11)	Teresa Weatherspoon (4)	Charlotte Coliseum	14–10
25	August 8	Los Angeles	W 80–62	Rebecca Lobo (22)	Sue Wicks (9)	Coquese Washington (8)	Madison Square Garden	15–10
26	August 11	Phoenix	W 79–78 (OT)	Sophia Witherspoon (17)	Rebecca Lobo (11)	Teresa Weatherspoon (7)	Madison Square Garden	16–10
27	August 13	Washington	W 88–45	Kisha Ford (19)	Rebecca Lobo (9)	Teresa Weatherspoon (7)	Madison Square Garden	17–10
28	August 15	Houston	W 70–54	Sophia Witherspoon (21)	Rebecca Lobo (12)	Teresa Weatherspoon (7)	Madison Square Garden	18–10
29	August 17	Cleveland	L 64–70	Rebecca Lobo (18)	Teresa Weatherspoon (5)	Johnson; Washington; Weatherspoon (4)	Madison Square Garden	18–11
30	August 19	@ Detroit	L 68–82	Sophia Witherspoon (26)	Teresa Weatherspoon (8)	Teresa Weatherspoon (8)	The Palace of Auburn Hills	18–12

1998 season schedule

=== Season standings ===
Eastern Conference	W	L	PCT	Conf.	GB
Cleveland Rockers ^{x}	20	10	.667	12–4	–
Charlotte Sting ^{x}	18	12	.600	11–5	2.0
New York Liberty ^{o}	18	12	.600	8–8	2.0
Detroit Shock ^{o}	17	13	.567	8–8	3.0
Washington Mystics ^{o}	3	27	.100	1–15	17.0

== Statistics ==
Legend
GP	Games played	GS	Games started	MPG	Minutes per game	RPG	Rebounds per game
APG	Assists per game	SPG	Steals per game	BPG	Blocks per game	PPG	Points per game
FG%	Field-goal percentage	3P%	3-point field-goal percentage	FT%	Free-throw percentage	TO	Turnovers per game
PF	Fouls per game		Team leader		League leader

=== Regular season ===
Player	GP	GS	MPG	FG%	3P%	FT%	RPG	APG	SPG	BPG	PPG
Teresa Weatherspoon	30	30	33.4	.338	.327	.609	4.0	6.4	3.3	0.0	6.8
Vickie Johnson	30	30	30.2	.446	.375	.768	3.8	2.5	1.0	0.2	12.5
Sophia Witherspoon	30	30	29.9	.401	.344	.786	3.0	1.9	1.3	0.1	13.8
Rebecca Lobo	30	30	29.2	.484	.308	.710	6.9	1.5	0.6	1.1	11.7
Kym Hampton	30	30	24.8	.452	.000	.716	6.0	0.9	1.1	0.5	9.1
Kisha Ford	30	0	15.7	.435	.182	.625	1.2	0.8	1.1	0.1	4.9
Sue Wicks	30	0	14.8	.430	.000	.800	2.8	1.2	0.5	0.3	4.3
Albena Branzova	11	0	8.5	.360	.500	.750	1.5	0.5	0.3	0.1	2.1
Elisabeth Cebrian	22	0	8.5	.429	N/A	.571	1.2	0.4	0.0	0.3	1.7
Coquese Washington	228	0	8.1	.294	.238	.692	0.9	1.6	0.6	0.0	1.9
Trena Trice	10	0	7.7	.412	N/A	.636	1.8	0.1	0.0	0.3	2.1
Alicia Thompson	19	0	6.6	.231	1.000	.632	1.3	0.2	0.1	0.1	1.6

^{‡}Waived/Released during the season
^{†}Traded during the season
^{≠}Acquired during the season
