= Jasmina Perazić =

Serbian-American basketball player

Georgian Court Lions
- Title: Head coach
- League: CACC

Personal information
- Born: 6 December 1960 (age 65) Novi Sad, PR Serbia, FPR Yugoslavia
- Listed height: 1.84 m (6 ft 0 in)
- Listed weight: 74 kg (163 lb)

Career information
- College: Maryland (1979–1983)
- Playing career: 1974–2000
- Position: Guard / forward
- Number: 4
- Coaching career: 2005–Present

Career history

Playing
- 1974–1976: Vojvodina
- 1976–1979: Eintracht, Frankfurt
- 1984: Voždovac
- 1997: New York Liberty

Coaching
- 2006–2010: Elizabeth Seton HS
- 2010–2014: Monmouth (assistant)
- 2014–present: Georgian Court

Career highlights
- ACC Tournament co-MVP (1983); Kodak All-American (1983)
- Stats at Basketball Reference
- Women's Basketball Hall of Fame
Medals
Women's basketball
Representing Yugoslavia
Bronze medal – third place	1980 Moscow	Team competition
EuroBasket
Silver medal – second place	1987 Cadiz	Team competition
Universiade
Bronze medal – third place	1983 Edmonton	Team competition
Gold medal – first place	1987 Zagreb	Team competition

Jasmina Perazić (born 6 December 1960) is a Serbian-American basketball coach and a former basketball player. Perazić was inducted into the Women's Basketball Hall of Fame in 2014. She is the current head coach of Division II Georgian Court University, a member of the Central Atlantic Collegiate Conference (CACC).

== Career ==
Perazić competed for Yugoslavia in the 1980 and 1984 Summer Olympics. In 2014, she was inducted into Women's Basketball Hall of Fame.

Currently, Perazic is the Head Women's Basketball Coach at Georgian Court University, an NCAA Division II University in Lakewood, NJ. After guiding the Lions to a perfect regular season (7-0) and a CACC regular season title during the COVID-19 shortened 2020–2021 season, Perazic was named the Central Atlantic Collegiate Conference Coach of the Year. The Lions earned the No. 1 seed in the CACC Tournament and advanced to the CACC Finals, their first finals appearance since becoming a Division II member in 2002–2003. GCU earned an at-large bid to the NCAA Division II National Tournament and on March 12, 2021, won the program's first ever game at the East Regional, downing divisional foe Concordia College in the Regional Quarterfinals.

== Career statistics ==
Legend
GP	Games played	GS	Games started	MPG	Minutes per game	RPG	Rebounds per game
APG	Assists per game	SPG	Steals per game	BPG	Blocks per game	PPG	Points per game
TO	Turnovers per game	FG%	Field-goal percentage	3P%	3-point field-goal percentage	FT%	Free-throw percentage
**Bold**	Career best	°	League leader

=== WNBA ===
==== Regular season ====
Year	Team	GP	GS	MPG	FG%	3P%	FT%	RPG	APG	SPG	BPG	TO	PPG
1997	New York	9	0	5.2	38.5	0.0	0.0	1.2	0.4	0.3	0.0	0.8	1.1
Career	1 year, 1 team	9	0	5.2	38.5	0.0	0.0	1.2	0.4	0.3	0.0	0.8	1.1

== Personal life ==
Perazić has a daughter, Deanna Gipe (married Marello). Deanna and her wife Erica reside in New Jersey.

== Achievements ==
- 2014 Women's Basketball Hall of Fame
- 2008 ACC Tournament Legend
- 2002 University of Maryland Athletic Hall of Fame
- 1986 MVP Balkan Championships
- 1985 Best Five of Europe
- 1984 MVP Pre-Olympic Tournament
- 1983 MVP European Championships
- 1983 Most Popular Player at the World Championships, 2nd Leading Scorer of the Tournament
- 1983 WBCA Kodak All American
- 1983 ACC Tournament MVP
- 1982 NCAA West Region All Tournament Team (Inaugural NCAA women's basketball tournament)

=== Coaching Awards and Accomplishments ===
- 2009 WBCA National Coach of the Year (District III)
- 2010 WCAC Coach of the Year
- 2010 Gazette Newspaper Coach of the Year
- 2020-2021 CACC Coach of the Year

=== With Yugoslav National Basketball Team ===
- 1980 Olympic Games Moscow, Russia Bronze Medal
- 1983 World Championships São Paulo, Brazil Placed 8th 2nd leading scorer with 17.6PPG Voted Most Popular Player of the Tournament
- 1983 World University Games Edmonton, Canada Bronze Medal
- 1984 Pre-Olympic Tournament Havana, Cuba MVP
- 1984 Olympic Games Los Angeles, United States of America Placed 6th
- 1986 Balkan Championships Tuzla, Bosnia and Herzegovina Gold Medal
- 1987 European Championships Cadiz, Spain Silver Medal
- 1987 World University Games Zagreb Croatia Gold Medal
- MVP 1986 Balkan Championships Tuzla Bosnia and Herzegovina
- MVP 1984 Pre Olympic Tournament Havana, Cuba
- Best Five of Europe and #1 Player in Europe 1983 Hungary, 1985 Italy
- Yugoslavian Cup Winner 1984 with ŽKK Voždovac (Zenski Kosarkaski Klub Vozdovac/Women's Basketball Club Vozdovac), Belgrade, Serbia (formerly Yugoslavian Women's Basketball League)
- 1997 New York Liberty, WNBA

== See also ==
- List of Serbian WNBA players
