= Coquese Washington =

American basketball player and coach (born 1971)

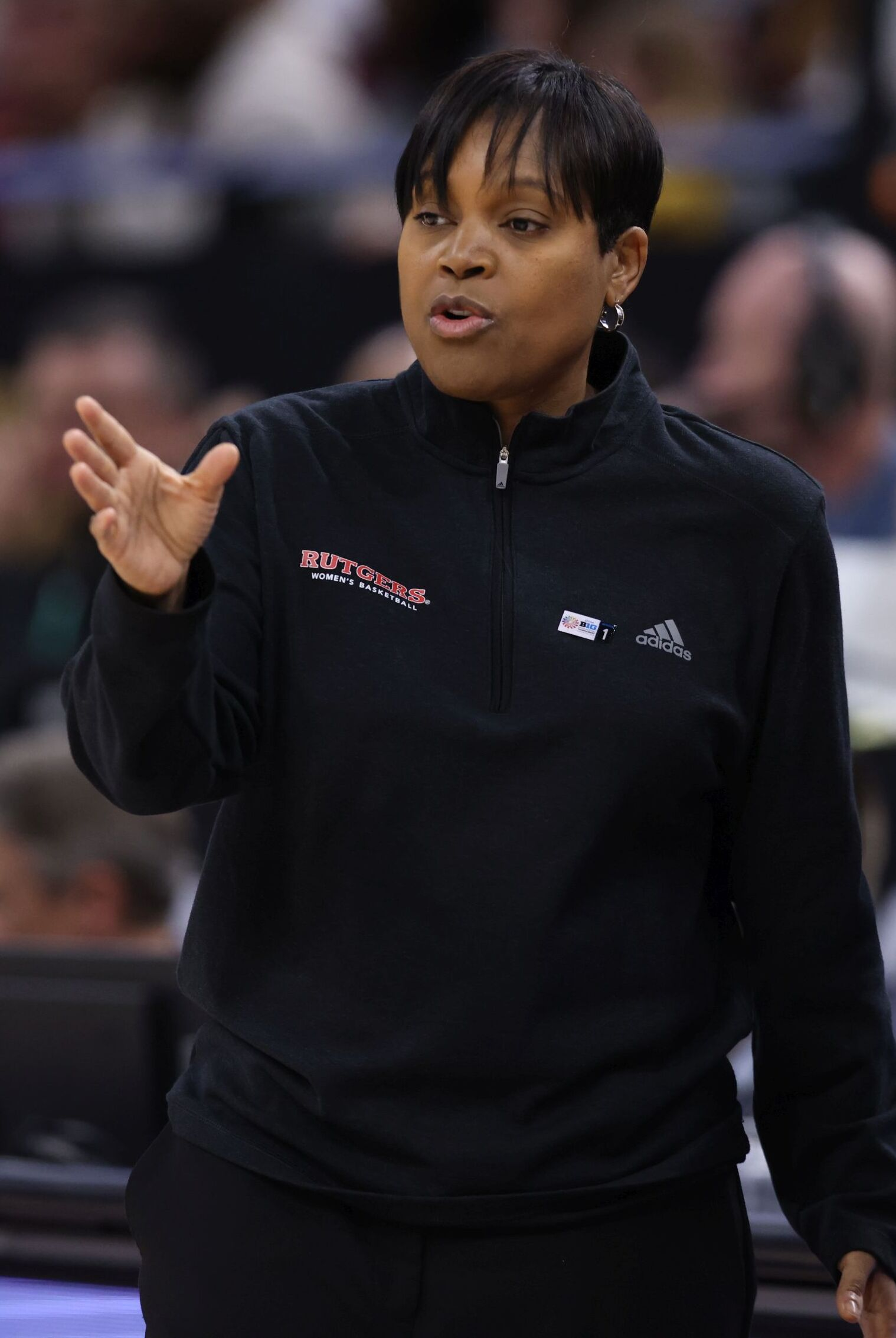
- Washington in 2024

Personal information
- Born: January 17, 1971 (age 55) Flint, Michigan, U.S.
- Listed height: 5 ft 6 in (1.68 m)
- Listed weight: 138 lb (63 kg)

Career information
- High school: Flint Central (Flint, Michigan)
- College: Notre Dame (1989–1993)
- Playing career: 1997–2003
- Position: Point guard
- Number: 4
- Coaching career: 1999–present

Career history

Playing
- 1997–1998: Portland Power
- 1998–1999: New York Liberty
- 2000–2002: Houston Comets
- 2002–2003: Indiana Fever

Coaching
- 1999–2007: Notre Dame (Asst.)
- 2007–2019: Penn State
- 2019–2020: Oklahoma (AHC)
- 2020–2022: Notre Dame (AHC)
- 2022–2026: Rutgers
- 2026-: SMU (Asst.)

Career highlights
- As player: WNBA champion (2000); Horizon All-Freshman Team (1990); As coach: 3 Big Ten regular season championships (2012–2014); BCA Female Coach of the Year (2011); Big Ten Coach of the Year (2011)
- Stats at Basketball Reference
Medals
Women's basketball
Assistant Coach for United States
World University Games
Gold medal – first place	2013 Kazan, Russia	Team Competition

Coquese Makebra Washington (born January 17, 1971) is a basketball coach and former player, who is currently an assistant coach for the SMU Mustangs women's basketball team. Earlier in her career, she was the head women's basketball coach for the Penn State Lady Lions from 2007 to 2019, and for the Rutgers Scarlet Knights from 2022 to 2026. Washington holds a Juris Doctor degree and was the first president of the WNBA Players Association, holding that position from 1999 to 2001. She played high school basketball at Flint Central High School and collegiate basketball at the University of Notre Dame.

== High school career ==
Washington attended high school at Flint Central High School in Flint, Michigan. She was the starting point guard for all four years of her high school basketball career, the first player at Central to earn a starting position in all four years. Washington earned all-state honors in back to back years. In her senior year she scored 373 points to set a school scoring record for a single season, And went on to score a total of 1,123 points in her career. She led the team to their first ever Saginaw Valley Conference and district championships. In addition to sports excellence, she also had musical talents, playing seven different musical instruments while at Central.

== College career ==
Washington played for Notre Dame's Fighting Irish women's basketball team from 1989 to 1993. Afterwards, she attended Notre Dame Law School from 1994 to 1997, earning her J.D.

== Professional career ==
=== ABL ===
After completing her athletic eligibility with the Irish in 1993, she began a professional career by joining the American Basketball League 1996-98 (ABL). She began her pro career in 1997–98 as the starting point guard with the ABL's Portland Power.

=== WNBA ===
- 1998–99 – New York Liberty – Washington averaged 4.1 minutes, 0.6 points, and 0.8 rebounds per game.
- 1999 – During the 2000 expansion draft on December 15, 1999, Washington was selected by the Portland Fire. However, Washington would never play for the Fire.
- 2000 – Houston Comets: Washington received playing time in 25 games, and throughout the season, she averaged 1.7 points and an assist per game.
- 2001 – Houston Comets: Washington started all 32 games, as a point guard. Throughout the season, she averaged 5.3 points, 3.8 assists, 3.7 rebounds, and 2.16 steals per game. On August 3, 2001, playing against Orlando and in her best game of the season, she posted ten points, nine rebounds, and six assists.
- 2003 – Indiana Fever: Washington started 10 games, playing 17.5 minutes per game. Throughout the season, she averaged 3.2 points, 2.4 assists, 1.5 rebounds, and 0.7 steals per game.

== Coaching career ==
=== Notre Dame ===
Washington began her coaching career in 1999, when she returned to her alma mater, University of Notre Dame, and worked as an assistant coach under Head Coach Muffet McGraw. She was part of the coaching staff for the team that won the NCAA Women's Division I Basketball Championship in 2001, defeating Purdue.

In August 2005, Washington was promoted to an Associate head coach, which includes the responsibility of coordinating Notre Dame's recruiting efforts on promising young players.

=== Penn State ===
On April 23, 2007, she was named the fifth coach in Penn State women's basketball history, following Rene Portland's resignation.

Washington increased her number of Big Ten wins in each of her first six years, starting with 4 conference wins in 2007–2008 and growing to 14 and her second consecutive Big Ten regular season title in the 2012–2013 campaign. Washington's first post season appearance at Penn State was a first round loss in the 2010 WNIT Tournament. Since 2011, Washington has led her teams to three consecutive NCAA Women's Division I Basketball Championship appearances where her teams have advanced past the first round in every appearance. Her most successful season was the 2011–2012 season when Washington's Lady Lions advanced to the Sweet Sixteen before losing to perennial powerhouse UConn.

In 2013, Coquese Washington was named to the 18-member "Presidential Search and Screen Committee" at Penn State to help determine the university's next President.

On March 8, 2019, Penn State and Washington parted ways after 12 seasons.

=== Oklahoma ===
On April 18, 2019, Washington was announced as the new associate head coach of the Oklahoma women's basketball program.

=== Notre Dame – Part II ===
For the 2020–2021 and 2021–2022 seasons, Washington returned to Notre Dame in the role of associate head coach.

=== Rutgers ===
On May 23, 2022, Washington was announced as the new head coach of the Rutgers women's basketball program. On March 2, 2026, Washington was fired after four seasons.

=== SMU ===
In April, 2026, it was announced that Washington was named an assistant coach at SMU.

== Career statistics ==
Legend
GP	Games played	GS	Games started	MPG	Minutes per game	RPG	Rebounds per game
APG	Assists per game	SPG	Steals per game	BPG	Blocks per game	PPG	Points per game
TO	Turnovers per game	FG%	Field-goal percentage	3P%	3-point field-goal percentage	FT%	Free-throw percentage
**Bold**	Career best	°	League leader

=== WNBA ===
==== Regular season ====
Year	Team	GP	GS	MPG	FG%	3P%	FT%	RPG	APG	SPG	BPG	TO	PPG
1998	New York	28	0	8.1	29.4	23.8	69.2	0.9	1.6	0.6	0.0	1.3	1.9
1999	New York	19	0	4.1	27.8	0.0	**100.0**	0.4	0.8	0.5	0.0	**0.7**	0.6
2000	Houston	25	0	9.4	36.4	20.0	80.0	0.8	1.0	0.6	0.0	0.8	1.7
2001	Houston	**32**	**32**	**31.7**	35.6	35.8	63.6	**3.7**	3.8	**2.2**	**0.3**	1.8	5.3
2002	Houston	21	15	16.6	34.0	38.1	**100.0**	2.0	1.5	0.6	0.0	1.0	2.1
2002	Indiana	11	8	29.5	**37.1**	**45.2**	70.0	3.0	**4.4**	2.1	0.2	2.2	**7.3**
2003	Indiana	20	10	17.4	28.4	29.2	84.6	1.5	2.4	0.7	0.1	1.5	3.2
Career	6 years, 3 teams	156	65	16.5	33.7	32.9	73.3	1.8	2.1	1.0	0.1	1.3	3.0

==== Playoffs ====
Year	Team	GP	GS	MPG	FG%	3P%	FT%	RPG	APG	SPG	BPG	TO	PPG
2000	Houston	**6**	0	15.3	**33.3**	**42.9**	83.3	1.8	1.0	0.8	**0.2**	1.3	2.3
2001	Houston	2	2	**37.0**	17.6	10.0	0.0	**4.5**	2.5	**1.0**	0.0	**1.0**	3.5
2002	Houston	3	**3**	36.7	**33.3**	37.5	**100.0**	2.0	**4.7**	**1.0**	0.0	2.0	**8.3**
Career	3 years, 1 team	11	5	25.1	28.3	30.3	85.7	2.4	2.3	0.9	0.1	1.5	4.2

=== College ===
Year	Team	GP	GS	MPG	FG%	3P%	FT%	RPG	APG	SPG	BPG	TO	PPG
1989–90	Notre Dame	29	-	-	41.5	**44.0**	54.8	2.1	3.9	2.3	0.1	-	6.8
1990–91	Notre Dame	**32**	-	-	**48.0**	39.3	75.0	3.8	**5.6**	2.6	**0.2**	-	9.2
1991–92	Notre Dame	25	-	-	37.4	28.0	74.0	3.8	**5.6**	**3.2**	0.0	-	7.4
1992–93	Notre Dame	27	-	-	38.9	35.1	**82.1**	**3.9**	4.5	3.0	0.0	-	**10.4**
**Career**		113	-	-	41.7	35.6	72.5	3.4	4.9	2.7	0.1	-	8.5
Statistics retrieved from Sports-Reference.

== Awards and honors ==
- 2007–08 WBCA "Rising Star" Award Winner
- 2009 Greater Flint Hall of Fame Inductee
- 2010–11 Black Coaches & Administrators Female Coach of the Year
- 2011–12 Big Ten Coach of the Year
- 2011–12 WBCA Region 6 Coach of the Year
- 2011–12 WBCA National Coach of the Year Finalist
- 2012–13 Big Ten Coach of the Year
- 2012–13 WBCA Region 6 Coach of the Year
- 2012–13 WBCA National Coach of the Year Finalist
- 2012–13 Black Coaches & Administrators Female Coach of the Year
- 2013–14 Big Ten Coach of the Year

== Head coaching record ==
Record table
Season	Team	Overall	Conference	Standing	Postseason
Penn State Lady Lions (Big Ten Conference) (2007–2019)
2007–08	Penn State	13–18	4–14	10th	
2008–09	Penn State	11–18	6–12	T–7th	
2009–10	Penn State	17–14	8–10	T–6th	WNIT 1st Round
2010–11	Penn State	25–10	11–5	2nd	NCAA 2nd Round
2011–12	Penn State	26–7	13–3	1st	NCAA Sweet Sixteen
2012–13	Penn State	26–6	14–2	1st	NCAA 2nd Round
2013–14	Penn State	24–8	13–3	T–1st	NCAA Sweet Sixteen
2014–15	Penn State	6–24	3–15	T-13th	
2015–16	Penn State	12–19	6–12	11th	
2016–17	Penn State	21–11	9–7	T-6th	WNIT Third Round
2017–18	Penn State	16–16	6–10	11th	WNIT 1st Round
2018–19	Penn State	12–19	5–13	12th	
Penn State:		209–169 (.553)	98–106 (.480)		
Rutgers Scarlet Knights (Big Ten Conference) (2022–2026)
2022–23	Rutgers	12–20	5–13	11th	
2023–24	Rutgers	8–24	2–16	14th	
2024–25	Rutgers	13–20	3–15	15th	WNIT Great 8
2025–26	Rutgers	9–20	1–17	18th	
Rutgers:		42–84 (.333)	11–61 (.153)		
Total:		251–253 (.498)			
National champion Postseason invitational champion Conference regular season champion Conference regular season and conference tournament champion Division regular season champion Division regular season and conference tournament champion Conference tournament champion

== Personal ==
Washington lives in Somerset, New Jersey with her husband, Raynell Brown, and their son, Quenton Kassius Winston Brown (b. April 24, 2005), and daughter, Rhaiyna Kamille Brown (b. July 23, 2009). She has a mother, Velma Washington, and her father James Washington. (d. 2013) She has two sisters, Stephanie and India, and two brothers, Ameer and Kenyatta (d. 2016). She is close friends with Notre Dame coach Carol Owens and head coach Niele Ivey.
