= Trena Trice-Hill =

American basketball player and coach (born 1965)

Columbia Lions
- Title: Assistant coach
- League: Ivy League

Personal information
- Born: August 4, 1965 (age 61) Norfolk, Virginia
- Listed height: 6 ft 2 in (1.88 m)
- Listed weight: 180 lb (82 kg)

Career information
- High school: Deep Creek (Chesapeake, Virginia)
- College: NC State (1983–1987)
- WNBA draft: 1997: 3rd round, 22nd overall pick
- Drafted by: New York Liberty
- Position: Power forward / center
- Number: 33

Career history

Playing
- 1997–1998: New York Liberty

Coaching
- 2002–2004: Hampton (assistant)
- 2004–2009: NC State (assistant)
- 2009–2010: Shaw University (assistant)
- 2010–2012: VCU (assistant)
- 2012–2015: Norfolk State (assistant)
- 2015–present: Columbia (assistant)

Career highlights
- 2× First-team All-ACC (1986, 1987); ACC All-Freshman team (1984); No. 15 retired at NC State
- Stats at Basketball Reference
Medals
Women's basketball
Jones Cup
Gold medal – first place	1985 Taipei	Team competition

Trena Trice-Hill (born August 4, 1965) is an American former professional basketball player for the New York Liberty and current assistant coach at Columbia University.

== College ==
Trice played basketball at NC State from 1983 to 1987, where she averaged 15.1 ppg and 8.4 rbg. She helped lead the Wolfpack to Atlantic Coast Conference (ACC) Tournament titles in 1985 and 1987 and an ACC regular season title in 1985. She retired sixth all-time in scoring (1,761), fourth all-time in rebounding (984), and second in blocks (184). She holds the record for the highest field goal percentage for a career (58.5%).

== WNBA career ==
Trice-Hill was selected in the 3rd round (22nd overall pick) of the 1997 WNBA draft by the New York Liberty. Her debut game was played on June 21, 1997 in a 67 - 57 win over the Los Angeles Sparks where she recorded 8 points, 1 rebound and 1 steal in the victory. The Liberty would finish the season 17 - 10 with Trice-Hill averaging 4.8 points and 2.4 rebounds. The team reached the WNBA Finals, but would unfortunately lose to the Houston Comets 65 - 51.

She returned to the Liberty for her second season but would miss 10 games after being placed on the team's injured list on June 23, 1998. She was removed from the injured list on July 14 and played her first game back the next day on July 15. She struggled in her return game, playing for 12 minutes and only recording 1 rebound along with no points (0 - 2 FG), 1 foul and 1 turnover in a 65 - 72 loss to the Utah Starzz.

Trice-Hill would play sporadically throughout the rest of the season, playing in just 4 of the Liberty's 14 remaining season games after July 15 (missing the team's last 5 games of the season completely). In those 4 games, she played a total of 21 minutes, scored 9 points and grabbed 5 rebounds. The fourth game of that stretch, played on August 8, 1998, ended up being Trice-Hill's final WNBA game ever. In her last game, she recorded 1 point and 1 rebound as the Liberty defeated the Sparks 80 - 62.

Trice-Hill finished her WNBA career playing all 38 of her games as a member of the Liberty, and averaged 4.1 points and 2.3 rebounds on 53% FG shooting.

== Personal life ==
Hill graduate with a degree in SpeechCommunications from NC State. She has a daughter.

== Career statistics ==
Legend
GP	Games played	GS	Games started	MPG	Minutes per game	RPG	Rebounds per game
APG	Assists per game	SPG	Steals per game	BPG	Blocks per game	PPG	Points per game
TO	Turnovers per game	FG%	Field-goal percentage	3P%	3-point field-goal percentage	FT%	Free-throw percentage
**Bold**	Career best	°	League leader

=== College ===
Year	Team	GP	Points	FG%	FT%	RPG	APG	SPG	BPG	PPG
1983–84	NC State	26	204	53.2%	58.0%	5.6	0.2	0.5	1.0	7.8
1984–85	NC State	**31**	460	57.3%	64.8%	7.6	0.2	1.3	1.5	14.8
1985–86	NC State	29	537	**60.4%**	**69.5%**	9.7	**0.6**	**1.4**	1.8	**18.5**
1986–87	NC State	**31**	**566**	59.6%	62.5%	**10.4**	0.5	1.3	**1.8**	18.3
Total		117	1761	58.5%	64.3%	8.4	0.4	1.2	1.6	15.1

=== WNBA ===
==== Regular season ====
Year	Team	GP	GS	MPG	FG%	3P%	FT%	RPG	APG	SPG	BPG	TO	PPG
1997	New York	**28**	0	**12.1**	**.554**	**.250**	**.667**	**2.4**	**.1**	**.3**	**.3**	1.4	**4.8**
1998	New York	10	0	7.7	.412	–	.636	1.8	**.1**	.0	**.3**	**.7**	2.1
Career	2 years, 2 teams	38	0	11.0	.532	.250	.661	2.3	.1	.2	.3	1.2	4.1

==== Playoffs ====
Year	Team	GP	GS	MPG	FG%	3P%	FT%	RPG	APG	SPG	BPG	TO	PPG
1997	New York	2	0	8.0	.800	–	1.000	1.0	.0	.5	.5	1.0	4.5
