= Nancy Darsch =

American women's basketball coach (1951–2020)

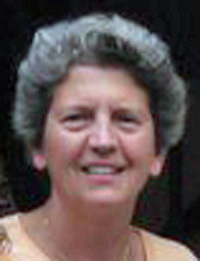
- Darsch in 2011

Biographical details
- Born: December 29, 1951; Plymouth, Massachusetts, U.S.
- Died: November 2, 2020 (aged 68); Plymouth, Massachusetts, U.S.
- Education: Springfield College; University of Tennessee

Coaching career (HC unless noted)
- 1978–1985: Tennessee (assistant)
- 1985–1997: Ohio State
- 1997–1998: New York Liberty
- 1999–2000: Washington Mystics
- 2003–2005: Minnesota Lynx (assistant)
- 2006–2008: Boston College (assistant)
- 2008–2013: Seattle Storm (assistant)

Accomplishments and honors

Championships
- WNBA Champion (2010)
Medal record
Representing United States
Women's basketball
Assistant coach for United States
Olympic Games
Gold medal – first place	1996 Atlanta	Team competition
Assistant coach for United States
FIBA World Championship for Women
Bronze medal – third place	1994 Sydney	Team competition
Assistant coach for United States
Goodwill Games
Gold medal – first place	1994 St. Petersburg	Team competition
Assistant coach for United States
World University Games
Gold medal – first place	1991 Sheffield	Team competition
Assistant coach for United States
William Jones Cup
Gold medal – first place	1984 Taipei	Team competition
Assistant coach for United States
Olympic Games
Gold medal – first place	1984 Los Angeles	Team competition

Nancy Darsch (December 29, 1951 – November 2, 2020) was an American women's basketball coach who worked at both the professional and NCAA Division I college levels. A native of Plymouth, Massachusetts, Darsch was a 1973 graduate of Springfield College. She also earned a master's degree in physical education from the University of Tennessee. Darsch was inducted into the Ohio State Athletics Hall of Fame on September 25, 2014.

== Early career and college basketball ==
Darsch began her coaching career at Longmeadow High School in Massachusetts, where she coached basketball, softball, and field hockey from 1973 to 1978. As an assistant under University of Tennessee head coach Pat Summitt from 1978 to 1985, Darsch helped lead the Lady Vols to five Final Four appearances. Darsch became the head coach at Ohio State University in 1985. In her 12 years at the helm at Ohio State, she led the Buckeyes to four Big Ten Conference Championships and seven NCAA appearances. In 1993, Darsch led Ohio State to a 24–4 record, a Big Ten Championship and the NCAA final. In the championship game, Ohio State lost to Texas Tech, 84–82. She compiled a record of 234–125 (.652) while at Ohio State. Darsch took on the role of assistant coach at Boston College in 2006 and 2007, helping the Eagles to compile a 33–27 record during those two seasons, as well as earning a berth in the post-season WNIT.

== Olympics ==
After 1984, Darsch had been part of USA Basketball. As an assistant coach for the USA Women's Olympic Basketball team she won Olympic gold medals in both the 1984 (Los Angeles) and 1996 (Atlanta) Olympic Games.

== USA Basketball ==
Darsch served as an assistant coach of the team representing the US in 1984 at the William Jones Cup competition in Taipei, Taiwan. The team chosen to represent the USA was the team expected to be selected as the national team for the Olympics. This resulted in a very strong team which was able to dominate the competition. In the opening game against Australia, the USA won 82–20. While other games were closer, Italy's 23-point loss to the USA was the closest of the eight games. The USA won all eight games, and won the gold medal. The USA team was led by Cheryl Miller, who led the team in scoring at over 15 points per game, rebounding, free throw percentage, assists and steals. Miller was named to the All-Tournament Team, along with Lynette Woodard, and Denise Curry.

Darsch served as the assistant coach to the team representing the US at the World University Games held in Sheffield, England, in July 1991. The USA team started out with a very strong offense, scoring over 100 points in each of the first four games. The fourth game was against the USSR, a team often challenging the US for the top spot, but the USA won 106–80 this time. The team fell short of 100 points in the game against Canada, but still won by 18 points. In the quarterfinal game, the USA won easily against Romania 135–53, with Ruthie Bolton scoring 40 points. The game against China was more of a challenge. The USA team shot poorly, hitting only 36% of their shots, but the defense held China to 35% shooting, and won a three-point game, 79–76. The gold medal match was against Spain, but the USA had a 13-point lead at halftime and won 88–62. Bolton was the highest scorer for the USA team with 14 points per game, but Lisa Leslie and Carolyn Jones were close behind with 13 points per game.

Nancy Darsch served as an assistant coach to the USA National team which competed at the 1994 FIBA World Championship for Women in Sydney, Australia. The USA team opened strong with large margins of victory in their first five games. The 18-point win over Australia was the smallest margin in that stretch of games. Then the USA team faced Slovakia, and had more of a challenge. The Slovakian team held a lead late in the game, before the USA team made a comeback and won 103–96. The next game was the semifinal against Brazil. The game was close most of the way, but Brazil hit ten free throws in ten attempts in the last minute of the game to edge out the USA 110–107. The USA faced Australia in the bronze medal game, the team they had beaten by 18 points only days before. This game would be much closer, but the USA held off the Aussies to claim the bronze medal.

== Professional ==
Darsch started her professional coaching career in the WNBA's inaugural season (1997) with the New York Liberty. As the head coach, she led the Liberty to a 17–11 season and the team advanced to the WNBA final against the eventual champion, the Houston Comets. She had the privilege of coaching the Liberty in the first-ever WNBA game against the Los Angeles Sparks. Darsch earned her first professional victory in that game with a 65–51 victory on June 21, 1997. In her two seasons with New York, she compiled a 36–24 record. In 1999, Darsch took over as head coach for the Washington Mystics. After two seasons at the helm, she became an advance scout for the team. For the seasons 2003-2005 she was an assistant coach with the Minnesota Lynx. Darsch's overall WNBA head coaching record stands at 57–57 in four seasons. Darsch joined the Seattle Storm and served as an assistant coach for the 2008 through 2013 seasons. In 2010, under the direction of Head Coach Brian Agler and Assistant Coach Nancy Darsch, the Seattle Storm won the WNBA Championship over Atlanta in three games.

== Post coaching career ==
She was also a substitute teacher for Plymouth Public Schools. Darsch died at the age of 68 on November 2, 2020, of Parkinson's disease.

== Head coaching record ==
Legend
Regular season	G	Games coached	W	Games won	L	Games lost	W–L %	Win–loss %
Playoffs	PG	Playoff games	PW	Playoff wins	PL	Playoff losses	PW–L %	Playoff win–loss %

Team	Year	G	W	L	W–L%	Finish	PG	PW	PL	PW–L%	Result
New York	1997	28	17	11	.607	2nd in East	2	1	1	.500	Lost in WNBA Finals
New York	1998	30	18	12	.600	2nd in East	—	—	—	—	Missed playoffs
Washington	1999	32	12	20	.375	5th in East	—	—	—	—	Missed playoffs
Washington	2000	20	9	11	.450	(replaced)	—	—	—	—	—
Career		110	56	54	.509		2	1	1	.500	
