= Kym Hampton =

American basketball player (born 1962)

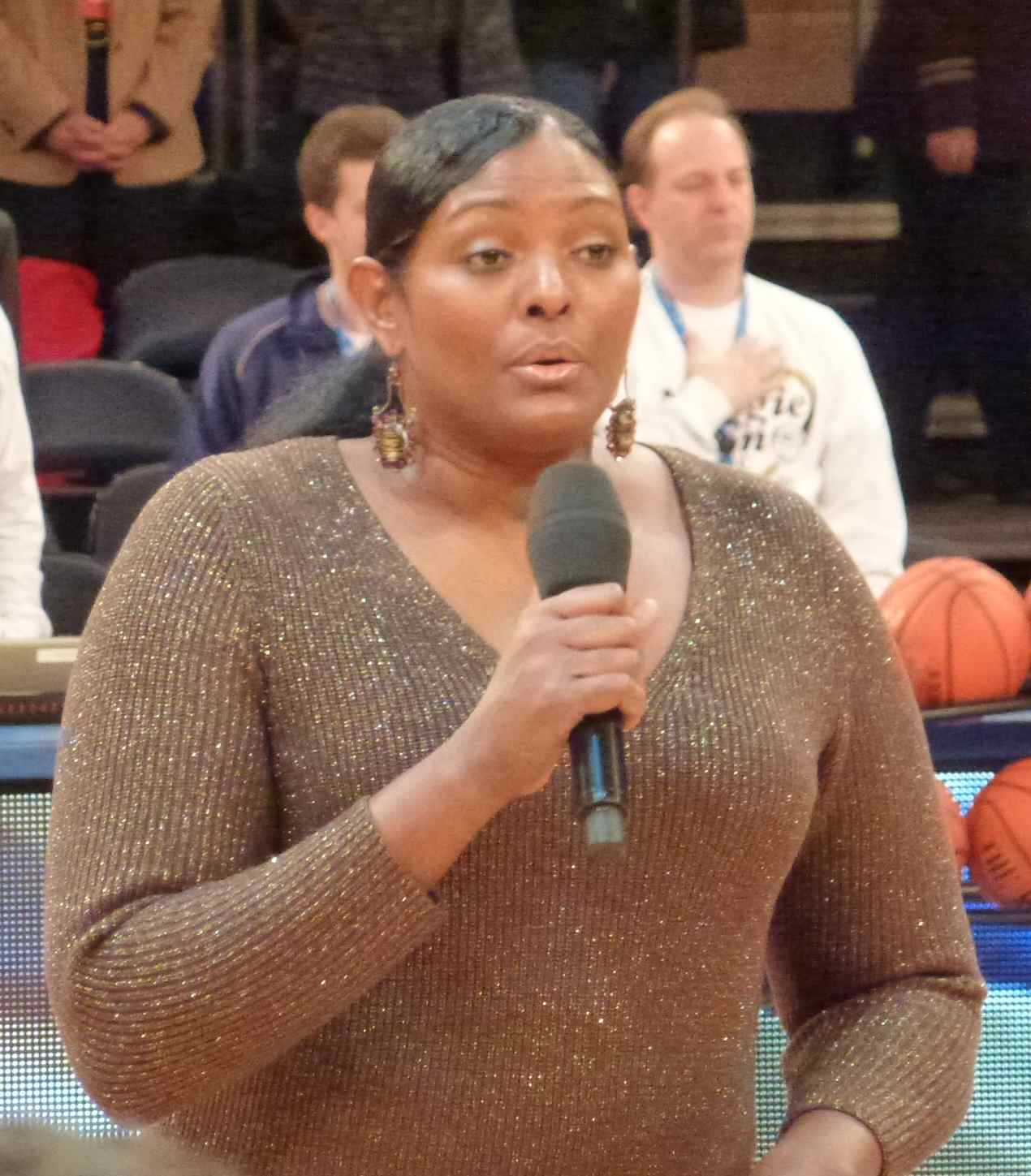
- Singing the national anthem at the 2012 Maggie Dixon Classic

Personal information
- Born: November 3, 1962 (age 64) Louisville, Kentucky, U.S.
- Listed height: 6 ft 2 in (1.88 m)
- Listed weight: 210 lb (95 kg)

Career information
- High school: Iroquois (Louisville, Kentucky)
- College: Arizona State (1980–1984)
- WNBA draft: 1997: 1st round, 4th overall pick
- Drafted by: New York Liberty
- Position: Center

Career history
- 1997–1999: New York Liberty

Career highlights
- WNBA All-Star (1999); No. 32 retired by Arizona State Sun Devils
- Stats at WNBA.com
- Stats at Basketball Reference

Kym Hampton (born November 3, 1962) is a retired professional basketball player. A 6'2" center, Hampton was drafted as the number four pick in the 1997 WNBA elite draft and played three seasons for the New York Liberty (1997–1999). Following a 12-year professional stint in Europe along with her three years in the WNBA, Hampton retired from basketball in 2000, due to worn cartilage in her right knee.

== Early life ==
Born and raised in Louisville, Kentucky, Hampton is one of seven children raised in a blended family after both parents remarried. Hampton attributes her athletic ability to her father's side of the family and her uncle, Charlie Hampton, was a Central High School standout. Both Kym Hampton and Charlie Hampton played on the Kentucky All-Star team.

=== High school ===
Hampton attended Iroquois High School in Louisville, Kentucky. She joined the Junior Varsity basketball team during her freshman year in 1976, at the urging of the head coach Marshall Abstain. Hampton ultimately scored 1,198 career points, averaging 23.5 points per game and 728 rebounds in three years. Kym was the starting center on both Kentucky All-Star and Kentucky East/West All-Star teams.

Hampton won the state championship in the shot put, three of her four years at Iroquois and set the state record 46' 4" in her senior year (1980). Hampton was asked by her track coach Bob Hanley, to compete in the high jump and discus during Iroquois Track Classic, and set two school records that day. 5'2" in the high jump and 116'6.5" in the discus.

=== College ===
Hampton attended Arizona State University from 1980 to 1984. During her college career, the Sun Devils made two consecutive trips, during the 1982 and 1983 seasons, to the Sweet 16, before being eliminated from the NCAA Tournament.

Hampton obtained her B.A. in theatre from Arizona State University in 1984. In 1989, Hampton was inducted into the Arizona State Hall of Fame. In 2014, Arizona State honored her by retiring her No. 32 jersey in a ceremony at Wells Fargo Arena where it now hangs in the rafters—an honor held by only three women's basketball players in ASU history.

Hampton set more than 40 school records during her tenure at Arizona State and more than four decades later, remains the all-time leading scorer (2,361 pts) and rebounder (1,415 reb), male or female at Arizona State—a record held since 1984.

== Career ==
After graduation, Hampton played internationally, spending six years in Spain, four and one half years in Italy, one year in France, and one year in Japan. In 1997, Hampton was selected as the number four pick in the WNBA Elite Draft, by the New York Liberty, in its inaugural season. Hampton's debut game was played on June 21, 1997, in a 67–57 win over the Los Angeles Sparks where she recorded 13 points, 7 rebounds, 3 steals and 1 block.

During her three-year WNBA career, Hampton became a signature front-court presence for the Liberty as she was the team's starting Center for all 90 of the games that she played for the team. Her averages of points and rebounds per game stayed similar amongst all three of her WNBA seasons. During her first year, Hampton averaged 9.8 points and 5.8 rebounds helping the Liberty to a 17–11 record a Finals appearance (losing the championship game to the Houston Comets). In her first Finals game, Hampton recorded a double-double of 13 points and 13 rebounds.

For her sophomore season, she averaged 9.1 points and 6.0 rebounds per game, including a career high 22 points, 10 rebounds performance against the Utah Starzz on June 21, 1998. The Liberty finished with a 18–12 record and unfortunately missed the playoffs this season. In her first two seasons, Hampton would share the front-court with teammate Rebecca Lobo who also started in every game she played for her first two seasons in the league.

But for Hampton's third season in 1999, Lobo would suffer an ACL injury and only played the first game of the season. Thus, Hampton's starting front court teammate became Sue Wicks. Hampton produced averages of 9.2 points and 5.6 rebounds while the Liberty once again made it back to the WNBA Finals. Also during this season, she would be the starting Center in the inaugural WNBA All-Star Game The Liberty would once again faceoff against the Comets in the Finals. In 1999, the Finals were a beast-of-three series instead of a single game. In that Finals series, Hampton averaged 6.6 points and 7.3 rebounds as the Liberty would suffer defeat to the Comets again.

Due to worn cartilage in her right knee, Hampton retired from the WNBA on May 26, 2000. For her career of 90 games played, she averaged 9.3ppg, 5.8rpg, and 1.0 apg.

Hampton's final WNBA game was played in Game 3 of the 1999 WNBA Finals on September 5, 1999. The Liberty would lose the game 47–59 to the Houston Comets, thus dropping the championship to the Comets as well. Hampton recorded 8 points, 2 rebounds and 2 assists in her final game.

== Post-career ==
Off the court, Hampton has pursued modeling, acting, and singing. She is an original CoverGirl Queen Collection model featured in print and a nationwide commercial. She was one of the original Lane Bryant "V-Girls" in a national V-Girl campaign. She's appeared in Glamour Magazine, Essence Magazine and other magazines. In 2012 Hampton was one of the women featured on ABC's The Revolution daytime TV show trying to improve themselves, particularly with regard to weight loss. Over a five-month period Hampton got her weight down to what it had been when she played professional basketball.

== Career statistics ==
Legend
GP	Games played	GS	Games started	MPG	Minutes per game	RPG	Rebounds per game
APG	Assists per game	SPG	Steals per game	BPG	Blocks per game	PPG	Points per game
TO	Turnovers per game	FG%	Field-goal percentage	3P%	3-point field-goal percentage	FT%	Free-throw percentage
**Bold**	Career best	°	League leader

=== WNBA ===
==== Regular season ====
Year	Team	GP	GS	MPG	FG%	3P%	FT%	RPG	APG	SPG	BPG	TO	PPG
1997	New York	28°	28°	23.7	**.474**	.000	.640	5.8	**1.4**	**1.4**	**.7**	1.8	**9.8**
1998	New York	30°	30°	24.8	.452	.000	.716	**6.0**	.9	1.1	.5	2.1	9.1
1999	New York	**32**°	**32**°	**26.8**	.431	**.500**	**.747**	5.6	.7	.7	.6	**1.6**	9.2
Career	3 years, 1 team	90	90	25.2	.451	.250	.697	5.8	1.0	1.0	.6	1.8	9.3

==== Playoffs ====
Year	Team	GP	GS	MPG	FG%	3P%	FT%	RPG	APG	SPG	BPG	TO	PPG
1997	New York	2	2	**32.5**	**.526**	–	**.700**	**13.5**	.5	**.5**	.5	**1.5**	**13.5**
1999	New York	**6**	**6**	30.2	.429	.000	.647	7.8	**1.8**	.3	**1.2**	1.8	8.8
Career	2 years, 1 team	8	8	30.8	.456	.000	.667	9.3	1.5	.4	1.0	1.8	10.0
