= Sophia Witherspoon =

American basketball player (born 1969)

Personal information
- Born: July 6, 1969 (age 57) Fort Pierce, Florida, U.S.
- Listed height: 5 ft 10 in (1.78 m)
- Listed weight: 145 lb (66 kg)

Career information
- High school: Fort Pierce Central (Fort Pierce, Florida)
- College: Florida (1988–1991)
- WNBA draft: 1997: 2nd round, 11th overall pick
- Drafted by: New York Liberty
- Playing career: 1997–2003
- Position: Guard
- Number: 13

Career history
- 1997–1999: New York Liberty
- 2000–2001: Portland Fire
- 2002–2003: Los Angeles Sparks

Career highlights
- WNBA champion (2002); First-team All-SEC (1991)
- Stats at Basketball Reference
Medals
Women's basketball
Representing the United States
World University Games
| Bronze medal – third place | 1993 Buffalo, New York | Team competition |

Sophia L. Witherspoon (born July 6, 1969) is an American former college and professional basketball player who was a guard for seven seasons in the Women's National Basketball Association (WNBA). Witherspoon played college basketball for the University of Florida, and was selected in the second round of the 1997 WNBA draft. She played professionally for the New York Liberty, Portland Fire and Los Angeles Sparks of the WNBA.

== Early life ==
Witherspoon was born in Fort Pierce, Florida. Her older brother introduced her to basketball when she was 6 years old. She attended Fort Pierce Central High School, where she was a standout high school basketball player for the Fort Pierce Central Cobras.

== College career ==
Witherspoon accepted an athletic scholarship to attend the University of Florida in Gainesville, Florida, where she played for coach Carol Ross's Florida Gators women's basketball team from 1988 to 1991. In three seasons as a Gator, she scored 1,381 points, made 445 rebounds, and was a first-team All-Southeastern Conference (SEC) selection in 1991. She graduated from the University of Florida with a bachelor's degree in health and human performance in 1991, and was inducted into the University of Florida Athletic Hall of Fame as a "Gator Great" in 2005. In her honor, the Florida Office of Student Life awards the Sophia Witherspoon Award for Overall Excellence each semester to two Gator athletes "who exemplify the positive attitude and strong work ethic in the classroom that they display on the playing field."

=== Florida statistics ===
Legend
| GP | Games played | GS | Games started | MPG | Minutes per game |
| FG% | Field goal percentage | 3P% | 3-point field goal percentage | FT% | Free throw percentage |
| RPG | Rebounds per game | APG | Assists per game | SPG | Steals per game |
| BPG | Blocks per game | PPG | Points per game | **Bold** | Career high |

| Year | Team | GP | Points | FG% | 3P% | FT% | RPG | APG | SPG | BPG | PPG |
|---|---|---|---|---|---|---|---|---|---|---|---|
| 1988-89 | Florida | **29** | 436 | 41.6% | 26.3% | 62.2% | 5.7 | 2.1 | 1.3 | 0.5 | 15.0 |
| 1989-90 | Florida | 28 | 424 | 40.7% | 22.9% | 59.1% | 4.4 | **2.2** | 1.8 | 0.5 | 15.1 |
| 1990-91 | Florida | 28 | **521** | **43.9%** | **38.0%** | **72.9%** | **5.7** | 1.9 | **2.4** | **0.7** | **18.6** |
| TOTALS | Florida | 85 | 1381 | 41.9% | 32.3% | 65.5% | 5.2 | 2.1 | 1.8 | 0.2 | 16.2 |

== USA Basketball ==
Witherspoon was named to the USA team for the 1993 World University Games competition in Buffalo, New York. The team had a 6–2 record and won the bronze medal. Witherspoon averaged 1.8 points per game.

== Professional career ==
The New York Liberty selected Witherspoon in the second round (11th pick overall) of the 1997 WNBA Draft. Her debut game was played on June 21, 1997 in a 67 - 57 victory over the Sparks where she recorded 6 points, 5 rebounds, 5 assists and 2 steals. She played for the Liberty her first three years in the league, being a starter in every game she played during her first two seasons. Witherspoon's minutes and PPG averages for her rookie year were 31.0 MPG and 14.5 PPG. During her second year she averaged 29.9 MPG and 13.8 PPG. However, her minutes diminished in her third season (down to 18.2 MPG) and so did her productivity (down to 8.5 points).

On December 15, 1999, Witherspoon was drafted by the Portland Fire during the 2000 expansion draft. She would play for the Fire for two seasons, averaging 16.8 points, 3.3 rebounds in the 2000 season, and 12 points, 2.4 rebounds in the 2001 season.

Along with her teammate Nikki Teasley, Witherspoon was traded to the Sparks for Ukari Figgs and Gergana Slavcheva on April 19, 2002. She officially signed with the Sparks on June 11, 2002 and would make the Finals during her first year with the team. The Sparks defeated the Liberty 2-0 and Witherspoon earned her first and only WNBA Championship. The Sparks reached the Finals again in 2003 but would be defeated by the Detroit Shock in three games (2-1).

After missing the entire 2003 season, Witherspoon would sign a contract as a free agent with the Charlotte Sting on April 5, 2004 but would be waived by them as part of the final roster cuts before the season started.

Due to her stint with the Sting not coming to fruition, Witherspoon's final WNBA game ever was Game 3 of the 2003 Finals against Detroit on September 16, 2003. The Sparks lost the game 78 - 83 with Witherspoon playing for three and a half minutes and only recording two missed 3-point attempts and no other stats.

== WNBA career statistics ==
Legend
| GP | Games played | GS | Games started | MPG | Minutes per game | RPG | Rebounds per game |
| APG | Assists per game | SPG | Steals per game | BPG | Blocks per game | PPG | Points per game |
| TO | Turnovers per game | FG% | Field-goal percentage | 3P% | 3-point field-goal percentage | FT% | Free-throw percentage |
| **Bold** | Career best | ° | League leader |

=== Regular season ===
| Year | Team | GP | GS | MPG | FG% | 3P% | FT% | RPG | APG | SPG | BPG | TO | PPG |
|---|---|---|---|---|---|---|---|---|---|---|---|---|---|
| 1997 | New York | 28 | 28 | 31.0 | 40.6 | 34.9 | 74.8 | 3.0 | **2.3** | **1.8** | **0.3** | 2.8 | 14.5 |
| 1998 | New York | 30 | 30 | 29.9 | 40.1 | 34.4 | 78.6 | 3.0 | 1.9 | 1.3 | 0.1 | 2.4 | 13.8 |
| 1999 | New York | **32** | 23 | 18.2 | 39.6 | 35.9 | 71.0 | 1.5 | 1.2 | 1.0 | 0.1 | 1.5 | 8.5 |
| 2000 | Portland | **32** | **32** | **33.2** | 38.4 | 36.8 | **87.1** | **3.3** | 2.1 | 1.2 | **0.3** | 2.8 | **16.8** |
| 2001 | Portland | 31 | 30 | 27.8 | 31.6 | 31.3 | 84.9 | 2.4 | 1.7 | 1.0 | **0.3** | 2.3 | 12.0 |
| 2002 | Los Angeles | 31 | 1 | 11.5 | **41.5** | **41.8** | 76.1 | 0.9 | 0.9 | 0.4 | 0.1 | 0.7 | 5.2 |
| 2003 | Los Angeles | 23 | 2 | 10.2 | 32.1 | 34.5 | 85.7 | 0.8 | 0.2 | 0.3 | 0.0 | **0.3** | 2.4 |
| Career | 7 years, 3 teams | 207 | 146 | 23.5 | 38.0 | 35.1 | 80.2 | 2.2 | 1.5 | 1.0 | 0.1 | 1.9 | 10.7 |

=== Playoffs ===
| Year | Team | GP | GS | MPG | FG% | 3P% | FT% | RPG | APG | SPG | BPG | TO | PPG |
|---|---|---|---|---|---|---|---|---|---|---|---|---|---|
| 1997 | New York | 2 | **2** | **32.5** | 27.8 | 40.0 | 0.0 | **5.0** | **2.5** | **1.5** | **1.0** | 2.5 | 6.0 |
| 1999 | New York | 6 | 0 | 14.3 | **44.7** | 40.0 | 63.6 | 2.2 | 0.3 | 0.7 | 0.0 | 1.3 | **7.5** |
| 2002 | Los Angeles | 6 | 0 | 6.5 | 35.7 | 36.4 | **100.0** | 0.8 | 0.3 | 0.2 | 0.0 | **0.2** | 3.0 |
| 2003 | Los Angeles | 5 | 0 | 2.8 | 20.0 | 0.0 | 75.0 | 0.4 | 0.0 | 0.2 | 0.0 | 0.4 | 1.0 |
| Career | 4 years, 2 teams | 19 | 2 | 10.7 | 37.3 | 34.5 | 73.7 | 1.6 | 0.5 | 0.5 | 0.1 | 0.8 | 4.2 |

== See also ==
- List of Florida Gators in the WNBA
- List of University of Florida alumni
- List of University of Florida Athletic Hall of Fame members
