= Kisha Ford =

American basketball player (born 1975)

Personal information
- Born: April 4, 1975 (age 51) Baltimore, Maryland, U.S.
- Listed height: 5 ft 10 in (1.78 m)

Career information
- High school: Bryn Mawr (Baltimore, Maryland)
- College: Georgia Tech (1993–1997)
- WNBA draft: 1997: 4th round, 27th overall pick
- Drafted by: New York Liberty
- Position: Guard / Forward

Career history
- 1997–1998: New York Liberty
- 1999: Orlando Miracle
- 2000–2001: Miami Sol

Career highlights
- First-team All-ACC (1997); ACC All-Freshman Team (1994)
- Stats at Basketball Reference
Medals
Women's basketball
Representing the United States
Jones Cup
Gold medal – first place	1998 Taipei	Team competition

Kisha Ford (born April 4, 1975) is a former WNBA player for the New York Liberty, Orlando Miracle, and the Miami Sol. She attended Bryn Mawr School and played college basketball at Georgia Tech, where she was the all-time leading scorer in team history. She competed with USA Basketball as a member of the 1995 Jones Cup Team that won the Bronze in Taipei. She was selected in the fourth round of the 1997 WNBA Draft at 27th overall by the New York Liberty. Over her WNBA career, she scored 442 points, grabbed 218 rebounds, and had 90 assists, and 111 steals.

== Georgia Tech ==
=== Georgia Tech statistics ===
Legend
GP	Games played	GS	Games started	MPG	Minutes per game
FG%	Field goal percentage	3P%	3-point field goal percentage	FT%	Free throw percentage
RPG	Rebounds per game	APG	Assists per game	SPG	Steals per game
BPG	Blocks per game	PPG	Points per game	**Bold**	Career high

Year	Team	GP	Points	FG%	3P%	FT%	RPG	APG	SPG	BPG	PPG
1993-94	Georgia Tech	27	437	43.0%	**37.5%**	**72.4%**	**8.6**	**4.0**	**3.4**	0.3	16.2
1994-95	Georgia Tech	28	521	45.4%	29.8%	64.6%	8.4	3.0	1.9	0.0	18.6
1995-96	Georgia Tech	**33**	448	40.5%	24.3%	68.2%	6.4	3.3	2.6	0.3	16.6
1996-97	Georgia Tech	27	**549**	**50.3%**	33.3%	70.4%	8.6	2.8	2.3	**0.6**	**20.3**
Career		109	1955	44.8%	29.8%	68.8%	8.0	3.3	2.6	0.3	17.9

== WNBA ==
Ford was drafted in the fourth round (27th overall pick) of the 1997 WNBA draft by the New York Liberty and played her debut game on June 21, 1997. In that game, the Liberty defeated the Los Angeles Sparks 67 - 57 with Ford recording 3 points, 1 rebound and 1 steal. By averaging 4.1 points and 1.7 rebounds, she helped the Liberty finish the 1997 season with a 17 - 11 record. The Liberty made it to the Finals but would lose to the Houston Comets.

For the 1998 season, Ford would play less minutes per game (16.9 to 15.7) and grabbed less rebounds per game (1.7 to 1.2), but did score more points (4.1 to 4.9) to help the Liberty to a record of 18 - 12. Even with a good record of 18 - 12, the Liberty would not make the playoffs at all (making it the first time in WNBA history that a team missed the playoffs after reaching the Finals the season prior).

During the 1999 expansion draft on April 6, 1999, Ford was selected by the Orlando Miracle. She only played 8 games for the team at 5.6 minutes per game and scored 0.5 points per game.

She signed as a free agent to the Miami Sol for the 2000 season, but right before the season began, she would be placed on the team's injured list for a finger fracture on her left hand on June 1, 2000. She would miss the Sol's first 4 games of the season due to injury but make her return on June 10 and go on to average 3.6 points and 2.2 rebounds in 28 games. The next season, Ford will remain with the Sol and on August 5, 2001 started a game for the 4th and final time in her career (the previous 3 starts were all in her rookie season in 1997). The Sol finished with a 20 - 12 record and made the playoffs but were eliminated in the first round by the Liberty in 3 games.

A couple of weeks before the 2002 season began, Ford was waived by the Sol on May 16, 2002. After being waived by the Sol, Ford did not play in the WNBA again, and thus the final game of her career was Game 3 of the 2001 Eastern Conference First Round versus the Liberty. That game was played on August 21, 2001 and Ford played for nearly 5 minutes, but recorded no stats other than 1 assist as the Sol lost 61 - 72.

== Career statistics ==
Legend
GP	Games played	GS	Games started	MPG	Minutes per game	RPG	Rebounds per game
APG	Assists per game	SPG	Steals per game	BPG	Blocks per game	PPG	Points per game
TO	Turnovers per game	FG%	Field-goal percentage	3P%	3-point field-goal percentage	FT%	Free-throw percentage
**Bold**	Career best	°	League leader

=== WNBA ===
==== Regular season ====
Year	Team	GP	GS	MPG	FG%	3P%	FT%	RPG	APG	SPG	BPG	TO	PPG
1997	New York	28°	**3**	**16.9**	.377	.150	.614	1.7	**.9**	1.0	.2	1.4	4.1
1998	New York	**30**°	0	15.7	**.435**	.182	.625	1.2	.8	**1.1**	.1	.5	**4.9**
1999	Orlando	8	0	5.6	.200	.000	**1.000**	.8	.0	.3	**.3**	**.1**	.5
2000	Miami	28	0	15.1	.306	**.250**	.574	**2.2**	.8	**1.1**	.0	1.0	3.6
2001	Miami	**30**	1	13.2	.325	.091	.563	**2.2**	.7	.6	.2	.6	2.4
Career	5 years, 3 teams	124	4	14.6	.366	.149	.598	1.8	.7	.9	.1	.8	3.5

==== Playoffs ====
Year	Team	GP	GS	MPG	FG%	3P%	FT%	RPG	APG	SPG	BPG	TO	PPG
1997	New York	2	0	**9.5**	.000	.000	–	**.5**	.5	**1.0**	.0	**.0**	.0
2001	Miami	**3**	0	6.7	**.200**	–	–	.3	**.7**	.0	.0	.3	**.7**
Career	2 years, 2 teams	5	0	7.8	.100	.000	–	.4	.6	.4	.0	.2	.4
