= Sue Wicks =

American basketball player and aquaculture farmer

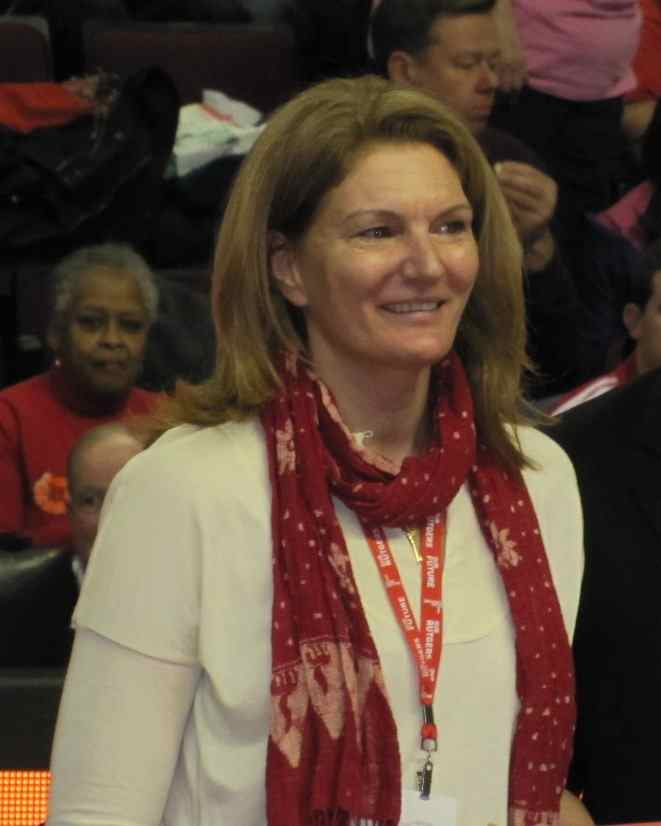
- Wicks being honored at a Rutgers-UConn game in 2013

Personal information
- Born: November 26, 1966 (age 59) Center Moriches, New York, U.S.
- Listed height: 6 ft 3 in (1.91 m)
- Listed weight: 174 lb (79 kg)

Career information
- High school: Center Moriches (Center Moriches, New York)
- College: Rutgers (1984–1988)
- WNBA draft: 1997: 1st round, 6th overall pick
- Drafted by: New York Liberty
- Playing career: 1997–2002
- Position: Forward
- Number: 23

Career history
- 1997–2002: New York Liberty

Career highlights
- WNBA All-Star (2000); Kim Perrot Sportsmanship Award (2001); Naismith College Player of the Year (1988); USBWA National Player of the Year (1988); 4× Kodak All-American (1985–1988); All-American – USBWA (1988)
- Stats at Basketball Reference
- Women's Basketball Hall of Fame
Medals
Women's basketball
Representing United States
Pan American
Gold medal – first place	1987 Indianapolis	Team

Susan Joy Wicks (born November 26, 1966) is an American former basketball player in the Women's National Basketball Association (WNBA). She played with the New York Liberty from 1997 to 2002. Wicks was inducted into the Women's Basketball Hall of Fame in 2013.

== Early years ==
Born in Center Moriches, New York, Wicks played for Rutgers University from 1984 to 1988. While at Rutgers, she was named a Kodak All-American in 1986, 1987 and 1988, and in 1988 she won the Naismith, U.S. Basketball Writers Association, Women's Basketball News Service and Street & Smith's National Player of the Year awards. She was Player of the Year in the Atlantic 10 Conference in 1986, 1987 and 1988, winning the Atlantic 10 Tournament MVP award in 1986 and 1988, and sharing it in 1987. She also was named to All-Regional Teams in the NCAA tournament in 1986 and 1987. She holds the Rutgers records for points scored (2,655), rebounds (1,357), scoring average (21.2 ppg), rebounding average (10.9 rpg), field goals made (1,091) and attempted (2,099), free throws made (473) and attempted (641), and blocked shots (293). The scoring and rebounding totals are records for a male or female player at Rutgers.

She was a gold medalist in the 1987 Pan-American Games.

Following her college career, she played professionally in Italy, Japan, Spain and Israel before the WNBA was founded. In 1997, she was signed for the inaugural WNBA season by the New York Liberty, to fill the role of back-up center. The Liberty played at the WNBA championship game, losing to the Houston Comets, 65–51.

== Career statistics ==
Legend
GP	Games played	GS	Games started	MPG	Minutes per game	RPG	Rebounds per game
APG	Assists per game	SPG	Steals per game	BPG	Blocks per game	PPG	Points per game
TO	Turnovers per game	FG%	Field-goal percentage	3P%	3-point field-goal percentage	FT%	Free-throw percentage
**Bold**	Career best	°	League leader

=== WNBA ===
==== Regular season ====
Year	Team	GP	GS	MPG	FG%	3P%	FT%	RPG	APG	SPG	BPG	TO	PPG
1997	New York	28	0	11.9	35.5	**28.6**	66.7	3.4	1.0	0.6	0.6	1.6	3.6
1998	New York	30	0	14.8	43.0	0.0	**80.0**	2.8	1.2	0.5	0.3	1.6	4.3
1999	New York	**32**	**30**	**29.3**	40.3	13.3	61.5	**7.0**	**1.4**	**1.3**	**1.3**	2.0	**6.8**
2000	New York	**32**	12	21.3	38.5	20.0	72.6	4.7	0.7	0.8	1.2	1.6	4.9
2001	New York	30	3	20.1	**46.9**	0.0	67.3	4.6	1.2	1.2	1.0	1.4	5.2
2002	New York	30	0	14.3	34.3	0.0	66.7	3.4	0.5	0.7	0.5	**1.0**	2.2
Career	6 years, 1 team	182	45	18.8	40.2	13.2	69.4	4.3	1.0	0.9	0.9	1.5	4.5

==== Playoffs ====
Year	Team	GP	GS	MPG	FG%	3P%	FT%	RPG	APG	SPG	BPG	TO	PPG
1997	New York	2	0	5.5	33.3	0.0	0.0	2.0	0.5	0.5	0.5	1.5	2.0
1999	New York	6	**6**	**29.0**	37.0	40.0	66.7	**6.8**	**1.7**	**1.0**	1.0	**0.7**	**7.0**
2000	New York	7	0	18.7	34.6	**100.0**	**100.0**	3.9	0.4	**1.0**	**1.3**	**0.7**	3.3
2001	New York	6	0	19.7	44.4	0.0	80.0	3.3	0.8	0.3	1.0	1.3	4.7
2002	New York	**8**	0	12.0	**50.0**	**100.0**	85.7	1.5	0.3	0.1	0.5	0.8	2.6
Career	5 years, 1 team	29	6	18.3	39.5	57.1	80.0	3.6	0.7	0.6	0.9	0.9	4.1

=== College ===
Legend
GP	Games played	GS	Games started	MPG	Minutes per game
FG%	Field goal percentage	3P%	3-point field goal percentage	FT%	Free throw percentage
RPG	Rebounds per game	APG	Assists per game	SPG	Steals per game
BPG	Blocks per game	PPG	Points per game	**Bold**	Career high

Year	Team	GP	Points	FG%	3P%	FT%	RPG	APG	SPG	BPG	PPG
1985	Rutgers	28	417	50.7%	NA	60.5%	8.8	1.5	NA	NA	14.9
1986	Rutgers	**33**	719	54.3%	NA	72.7%	10.1	2.5	NA	NA	21.8
1987	Rutgers	**33**	726	50.1%	NA	75.8%	**12.2**	2.5	NA	NA	22.0
1988	Rutgers	31	**793**	**52.6%**	0.0%	**81.2%**	12.1	**2.6**	**2.6**	**2.5**	**25.6**°
Career		125	2655	52.0%	0.0%	73.8%	10.9	2.3	0.6	0.6	21.2

== WNBA career ==
On April 28, 1997, Wicks was drafted with the 6th overall pick of the 1997 WNBA draft to the New York Liberty. She would go on to play 6 seasons in the WNBA, all 6 of them being a member of the Liberty. Her debut game was played on June 21, 1997, in a 67–57 victory over the Los Angeles Sparks where she recorded 2 points, 1 rebound, 1 steal and 1 block.

Wicks mostly came off the bench for the Liberty but did start 45 of 182 regular season games, including 30 starts (out of 32 games played) in 1999. Wicks starting in 1999 was due in part to her defensive skills. She developed into a fan favorite and was voted by the fans as a starter in the 2000 WNBA all-star game. In 2000, she received the WNBA's top award for sportsmanship, the Kim Perrot Sportsmanship Award.

In 1997, 1999 and 2000, Wicks and the Liberty reached the WNBA Finals, only to be beaten by the Houston Comets every time. In 2002, Wicks and the Liberty returned to the Finals again, but this time, they lost to Lisa Leslie and the Los Angeles Sparks. After being defeated in the 2002 Finals, Wicks would not play in the WNBA again, as she announced her retirement on April 29, 2003. Her final WNBA game was Game 2 of the 2002 Finals on August 31, 2002. The Liberty lost the championship game to the Sparks 66 - 69 with Wicks recording 2 points, 4 rebounds and 1 steal.

In 182 WNBA games played, Wicks scored 823 points, for a total of 4.5 points per game, had 182 assists for one assist per game, recovered 788 rebounds, for a total of 4.3 per game, and had 158 blocks, for a total of 0.90 blocks per game. She finished her WNBA career as the number eight leader of all times in shots blocked.

== Personal life ==
Wicks was one of the few players willing to discuss sexual orientation in the WNBA during her career. She said, "I can't say how many players are gay ... but it would be easier to count the straight ones." She also said she found it "annoying" that the league almost exclusively promoted those who were mothers. "I like it when they give insight into athletes, and I think it's great when they say, 'Here's a player and her husband and baby.' But I'd love to see a couple of women profiled, too, especially if they had a great, solid relationship, just to show that in a positive light."

In 2002, she came out as gay, making her the first openly gay person playing in the WNBA.

== Coaching career ==
Since retiring from professional basketball, Wicks formed an all-girls basketball camp in New York City. In 2004, she completed her bachelor's degree at Rutgers and was hired as the Coordinator of Operations for the Rutgers women's basketball team. In 2005, she was named an assistant coach of the team.

Wicks was inducted into the Suffolk Sports Hall of Fame on Long Island in the Basketball Category with the Class of 1991. She was inducted into the Rutgers Basketball Hall of Fame in 1994 and was inducted into the university's Hall of Distinguished Alumni in 2005. She is one of only two Rutgers women's basketball players to have her jersey retired.

In July 2006, she became the Assistant Coach for the women's basketball team at Saint Francis College in Brooklyn, New York. After leaving her assistant coaching position at Saint Francis College, Wicks said that she felt that being an out lesbian was an overwhelming liability in getting a job as a women's basketball coach.

== Hall of Fame ==
Wicks was inducted in the Women's Basketball Hall of Fame in June 2013. She did not have a prepared speech, but spoke extemporaneously, thanking Pat Summitt for her leadership in the formation of the Hall of Fame. Her credentials included selection as a Kodak All-American three times, and the record-holder of career points and rebounds at Rutgers, records which had not been surpassed by any male or female players at Rutgers at the time of the induction. She also played professionally in the WNBA and was on the gold medal-winning USA Basketball Pan-American Games team in 1987.
