= 2003 Connecticut Sun season =

- Head coach: Mike Thibault
- Arena: Mohegan Sun Arena

Results
- Record: 18–16 (.529)
- Place: 3rd (Eastern)
- Playoff finish: Lost in Eastern Conference Finals

The 2003 WNBA season was their fifth season and their first in Connecticut. The Sun made the playoffs for the first time since 2000. They would sweep the Charlotte Sting in the first round, only to get swept to the eventual champion Detroit Shock in the conference finals.

== Offseason ==
=== Dispersal Draft ===
Based on the Sun's 2002 record, they would pick 6th in the Miami Sol/Portland Fire dispersal draft. The Sun selected point guard Debbie Black.

=== WNBA draft ===
Round	Pick	Player	Nationality	School/team/country
2	13	Courtney Coleman	United States	Ohio State
3	34	Lindsay Wilson	United States	Iowa State

=== Transactions ===
- September 23: Rebecca Lobo announced her retirement.
- May 21: The Sun waived Rasheeda Clark and Lindsey Wilson and announced the retirement of Carla McGhee.
- May 10: The Sun waived Brianne Stepherson.
- May 7: The Sun waived Natalie Powers.
- May 1: The Sun waived Davalyn Cunningham.
- February 14: The Sun traded its second-round pick in the 2003 WNBA Draft to the Houston Comets in return for Rebecca Lobo.

== Roster ==
2003 Connecticut Sun roster
Players
Coaches

Pos.	No.	Nat.	Name	Height	Weight	From
G	24	(United States)	Black, Debbie	5' 3" (1.6m)	124 lb (56kg)	Saint Joseph's
F	15	(United States)	Coleman, Courtney	6' 0" (1.83m)	170 lb (77kg)	Ohio State
G/F	32	(United States)	Douglas, Katie	6' 0" (1.83m)	165 lb (75kg)	Purdue
F/C	7	(United States)	Hicks, Jessie	6' 4" (1.93m)	188 lb (85kg)	Maryland
G	31	(United States)	Johnson, Adrienne	5' 10" (1.78m)	154 lb (70kg)	Ohio State
G	14	(United States)	Johnson, Shannon	5' 7" (1.7m)	152 lb (69kg)	South Carolina
F	50	(United States)	Lobo, Rebecca	6' 4" (1.93m)	185 lb (84kg)	Connecticut
F/C	11	(United States)	McWilliams-Franklin, Taj (C)	6' 2" (1.88m)	184 lb (83kg)	St. Edward's College
F	3	(United States)	Palmer-Daniel, Wendy	6' 2" (1.88m)	165 lb (75kg)	Virginia
G/F	42	(United States)	Sales, Nykesha (C)	6' 0" (1.83m)	175 lb (79kg)	Connecticut
F	21	(United States)	Wyckoff, Brooke	6' 1" (1.85m)	183 lb (83kg)	Florida State

Head coach
(United States) Mike Thibault (Saint Martin's)
Assistant coaches
(United States) Scott Hawk (Omaha)
(United States) Bernadette Mattox (Georgia)
Athletic trainer
(United States) Jen Brodeur
Strength and conditioning coach
(United States) Lisa Ciaravella (Lynn)

Legend

- (C) Team captain
- (DP) Unsigned draft pick
- (FA) Free agent
- (S) Suspended
- Injured

== Season standings ==
Eastern Conference	W	L	PCT	GB	Home	Road	Conf.
Detroit Shock ^{x}	25	9	.735	–	13–4	12–5	18–6
Charlotte Sting ^{x}	18	16	.529	7.0	13–4	5–12	12–12
Connecticut Sun ^{x}	18	16	.529	7.0	10–7	8–9	11–13
Cleveland Rockers ^{x}	17	17	.500	8.0	11–6	6–11	13–11
Indiana Fever ^{o}	16	18	.471	9.0	11–6	5–12	12–12
New York Liberty ^{o}	16	18	.471	9.0	11–6	5–12	11–13
Washington Mystics ^{o}	9	25	.265	16.0	3–14	6–11	7–17

== Schedule ==
=== Preseason ===
Game	Date	Opponent	Result	Record
1	May 6	New York	L 73–81	0–1
2	May 11	@ Charlotte	W 65–64	1-1
3	May 16	Houston	L 72–79	1–2

=== Regular season ===
Game	Date	Opponent	Result	Record
1	May 24	Los Angeles	L 73–82	0–1
2	May 30	@ Houston	W 91–83	1-1
3	June 1	@ San Antonio	W 83–64	2–1
4	June 5	@ Detroit	L 89–103	2-2
5	June 7	Houston	W 65–58	3–2
6	June 13	Washington	W 84–70	4–2
7	June 14	@ Cleveland	L 56–84	4–3
8	June 18	Cleveland	W 70–57	5–3
9	June 20	@ Indiana	L 74–84	5–4
10	June 22	Detroit	L 73–82 (OT)	5–5
11	June 24	@ Washington	W 65–63	6–5
12	June 26	Indiana	L 90–94 (OT)	6–6
13	June 28	@ Charlotte	L 55–69	6–7
14	July 1	@ New York	L 64–90	6–8
15	July 2	Cleveland	W 64–57	7–8
16	July 4	Sacramento	W 69–67	8-8
17	July 6	New York	W 62–58	9–8
18	July 8	@ Detroit	L 50–66	9-9
19	July 10	@ Minnesota	L 75–83	9–10
20	July 17	Seattle	L 65–67	9–11
21	July 19	@ Phoenix	W 75–67	10–11
22	July 20	@ Los Angeles	W 76–73	11–11
23	July 23	Minnesota	W 84–70	12–11
24	July 26	Charlotte	W 74–70	13–11
25	August 1	Washington	L 45–48	13–12
26	August 3	Indiana	W 66–55	14–12
27	August 5	Detroit	L 61–78	14–13
28	August 9	@ Charlotte	L 68–69	14–14
29	August 12	New York	L 73–74	14–15
30	August 16	@ New York	W 84–71	15–15
31	August 19	@ Cleveland	L 52–69	15–16
32	August 22	Charlotte	W 63–55	16–16
33	August 23	@ Washington	W 74–67	17–16
34	August 25	@ Indiana	W 72–62	18–16

=== Playoffs ===
In the first round of the Eastern Conference Playoffs, the Sun had to face the Charlotte Sting. Since the Sting had the better record, the series would be played with game 1 at Connecticut, game 2 at Charlotte, and game 3 (if needed) at Charlotte. The Sun swept the Sting and advanced to the second round. In the second round of the Eastern Conference Playoffs, the Sun had to face the Detroit Shock. Since the Shock had the better record, the series would be played with game 1 at Connecticut and games 2 and 3 (if needed) at Detroit. The Shock swept the Sun and game 3 was not needed.

Game	Date	Opponent	Result	Record
1	August 28	Charlotte	W 68–66	1–0
2	August 30	@ Charlotte	W 68–62	2–0
3	September 5	Detroit	L 63–73	2–1
4	September 7	@ Detroit	L 73–79	2–2

== Depth ==
Pos.	Starter	Bench	Inactive
C	Taj McWilliams-Franklin	Jessie Hicks
PF	Brooke Wyckoff	Wendy Palmer -- Rebecca Lobo
SF	Katie Douglas	Courtney Coleman
SG	Nykesha Sales	Adrienne Johnson
PG	Shannon Johnson	Debbie Black

== Player stats ==
- http://www.wnba.com/sun/stats/2003/

== Awards and honors ==
- Shannon Johnson and Nykesha Sales were named to the WNBA All-Star team.
- Nykesha Sales was given the Off Season Community Assist Award.
