= 2003 New York Liberty season =

- Head coach: Richie Adubato
- Arena: Madison Square Garden

Results
- Record: 16–18 (.471)
- Place: 6th (Eastern)
- Playoff finish: Did not qualify

The 2003 WNBA season was the seventh for the New York Liberty. The Liberty fell one game short for the playoffs, also missing the postseason for the first time since 1998.

== Offseason ==
=== Dispersal Draft ===
Pick	Player	Nationality	Former team
11	Elena Baranova (F)	United States	Miami Sol

=== WNBA draft ===
Round	Pick	Player	Nationality	College/School/Team
1	10	Molly Creamer (G)	United States	Bucknell
2	17	Erin Thorn (G)	United States	Brigham Young
2	24	Sonja Mallory (C)	United States	Georgia Tech
3	39	Nicole Kaczmarski (G)	United States	UCLA

== Regular season ==
=== Season standings ===
Eastern Conference	W	L	PCT	GB	Home	Road	Conf.
Detroit Shock ^{x}	25	9	.735	–	13–4	12–5	18–6
Charlotte Sting ^{x}	18	16	.529	7.0	13–4	5–12	12–12
Connecticut Sun ^{x}	18	16	.529	7.0	10–7	8–9	11–13
Cleveland Rockers ^{x}	17	17	.500	8.0	11–6	6–11	13–11
Indiana Fever ^{o}	16	18	.471	9.0	11–6	5–12	12–12
New York Liberty ^{o}	16	18	.471	9.0	11–6	5–12	11–13
Washington Mystics ^{o}	9	25	.265	16.0	3–14	6–11	7–17

=== Season schedule ===
Game	Date	Opponent	Result	Record
1	May 31	@ Cleveland	L 50–74	0–1
2	June 1	Washington	W 70–57	1-1
3	June 6	@ Minnesota	W 70–60	2–1
4	June 7	@ Indiana	L 66–86	2–2
5	June 10	Cleveland	W 73–65	3–2
6	June 14	Los Angeles	L 60–67	3–3
7	June 17	Sacramento	W 70–61	4–3
8	June 20	@ Detroit	L 83–88	4–4
9	June 22	Charlotte	W 69–57	5-4
10	June 25	Phoenix	W 70–64	6–4
11	June 27	Detroit	L 69–75	6–5
12	July 1	Connecticut	W 90–64	7–5
13	July 6	@ Connecticut	L 58–62	7–6
14	July 10	@ Indiana	L 69–76	7–7
15	July 15	Washington	L 64–77	7–8
16	July 18	Charlotte	W 56–48	8–8
17	July 20	Indiana	W 73–65	9–8
18	July 23	@ Seattle	L 65–75	9–9
19	July 24	@ Sacramento	L 53–67	9–10
20	July 26	@ Houston	L 53–61	9–11
21	July 29	@ Phoenix	L 59–66	9–12
22	August 1	Detroit	L 60–62	9–13
23	August 3	Cleveland	W 60–48	10–13
24	August 5	San Antonio	W 69–60	11–13
25	August 7	@ Charlotte	L 54–65	11–14
26	August 9	@ Washington	W 65–56	12–14
27	August 10	@ Detroit	L 87–90 (OT)	12–15
28	August 12	@ Connecticut	W 74–73	13–15
29	August 16	Connecticut	L 71–84	13–16
30	August 17	@ Cleveland	W 71–54	14–16
31	August 18	Houston	W 67–64	15–16
32	August 21	@ Washington	W 65–60	16–16
33	August 22	Indiana	L 51–64	16–17
34	August 24	@ Charlotte	L 59–61 (OT)	16–18

== Player stats ==
Player	GP	REB	AST	STL	BLK	PTS
Vickie Johnson	32	95	75	29	7	430
Crystal Robinson	33	70	63	40	13	395
Tari Phillips	33	280	56	56	28	372
Elena Baranova	33	181	64	36	43	278
Tamika Whitmore	33	122	25	35	22	271
Becky Hammon	11	21	18	10	1	162
Teresa Weatherspoon	34	97	149	28	5	98
K.B. Sharp	30	32	37	14	0	94
Linda Frohlich	26	36	15	6	8	83
Erin Thorn	23	11	16	4	1	44
Lindsey Yamasaki	24	12	9	4	0	16
Bethany Donaphin	1	0	0	0	0	0
