= 2003 Indiana Fever season =

4th season in the WNBA

- Head coach: Nell Fortner
- Arena: Conseco Fieldhouse

Results
- Record: 16–18 (.471)
- Place: 5th (Eastern)
- Playoff finish: Did not qualify

The 2003 Indiana Fever season was the franchise's 4th season in the WNBA and their final season under head coach, Nell Fortner. The Fever attempted to reach the postseason, but they missed the postseason for the third time in four seasons.

== Offseason ==
=== Dispersal Draft ===
Pick	Player	Nationality	Former team
7	Sylvia Crawley (C)	United States	Portland Fire

=== WNBA draft ===
Round	Pick	Player	Nationality	College/School/Team
1	6	Gwen Jackson (F)	United States	Tennessee
2	20	DeTrina White (F)	United States	LSU
3	35	Ashley McElhiney (G)	United States	Vanderbilt

== Regular season ==
=== Season standings ===
Eastern Conference	W	L	PCT	GB	Home	Road	Conf.
Detroit Shock ^{x}	25	9	.735	–	13–4	12–5	18–6
Charlotte Sting ^{x}	18	16	.529	7.0	13–4	5–12	12–12
Connecticut Sun ^{x}	18	16	.529	7.0	10–7	8–9	11–13
Cleveland Rockers ^{x}	17	17	.500	8.0	11–6	6–11	13–11
Indiana Fever ^{o}	16	18	.471	9.0	11–6	5–12	12–12
New York Liberty ^{o}	16	18	.471	9.0	11–6	5–12	11–13
Washington Mystics ^{o}	9	25	.265	16.0	3–14	6–11	7–17

=== Season schedule ===
Game	Date	Opponent	Result	Record
1	May 29	@ Charlotte	L 57–66	0–1
2	May 31	Washington	W 71–60	1–1
3	June 7	New York	W 86–66	2–1
4	June 10	@ Seattle	L 51–78	2–2
5	June 12	@ Los Angeles	L 66–74	2–3
6	June 14	@ Sacramento	W 79–67	3–3
7	June 17	Charlotte	W 71–60	4–3
8	June 20	Connecticut	W 84–74	5–3
9	June 21	@ Minnesota	L 58–66	5–4
10	June 24	@ Detroit	L 60–68	5–5
11	June 26	@ Connecticut	W 94–90 (OT)	6–5
12	June 28	Seattle	W 79–70	7–5
13	June 29	@ Cleveland	L 53–66	7–6
14	July 2	Phoenix	W 79–68	8–6
15	July 6	Detroit	W 85–54	9–6
16	July 8	@ Houston	L 56–60	9–7
17	July 10	New York	W 76–69	10–7
18	July 16	Detroit	L 68–70	10–8
19	July 20	@ New York	L 65–73	10–9
20	July 23	San Antonio	W 81–47	11–9
21	July 24	@ Washington	W 80–75	12–9
22	July 26	Minnesota	L 65–70	12–10
23	July 29	@ Washington	W 92–91 (OT)	13–10
24	August 2	@ Detroit	L 58–72	13–11
25	August 3	@ Connecticut	L 55–66	13–12
26	August 7	Houston	L 55–68	13–13
27	August 9	Cleveland	L 62–66	13–14
28	August 10	@ Cleveland	L 67–71	13–15
29	August 12	Washington	L 80–84	13–16
30	August 16	Charlotte	W 69–63	14–16
31	August 20	@ Charlotte	L 50–80	14–17
32	August 22	@ New York	W 64–51	15–17
33	August 23	Cleveland	W 59–46	16–17
34	August 25	Connecticut	L 62–72	16–18

== Player stats ==
Player	GP	REB	AST	STL	BLK	PTS
Tamika Catchings	34	272	114	72	35	671
Natalie Williams	34	255	46	43	21	457
Kristen Rasmussen	33	115	64	24	15	226
Stephanie McCarty	28	41	58	34	6	194
Kelly Schumacher	34	99	20	7	24	189
Coretta Brown	30	41	31	21	4	186
Niele Ivey	27	32	71	29	7	135
Nikki McCray	34	51	49	37	2	131
Coquese Washington	20	29	48	14	2	63
Bridget Pettis	31	19	8	4	1	49
Sonja Henning	23	25	29	14	0	24
Leigh Aziz	7	9	1	0	4	10
Zuzana Klimešová	1	0	0	0	0	2
