= 2003 Charlotte Sting season =

- Head coach: Trudi Lacey
- Arena: Charlotte Coliseum

Results
- Record: 18–16 (.529)
- Place: 2nd (Eastern)
- Playoff finish: Lost First Round (2-0) to Connecticut Sun

The 2003 WNBA season was the seventh season for the Charlotte Sting. The team qualified for the playoffs for the 6th and last time in franchise history, losing the opening round in a sweep to the Connecticut Sun.

== Offseason ==
=== Dispersal Draft ===
| Pick | Player | Nationality | Former team |
|---|---|---|---|
| 10 | Pollyanna Johns Kimbrough | United States | Miami Sol |

=== WNBA draft ===
| Round | Pick | Player | Nationality | College/School/Team |
|---|---|---|---|---|
| 1 | 9 | Jocelyn Penn (F) | United States | South Carolina |
| 2 | 23 | Dana Cherry (G) | United States | Arkansas |

== Regular season ==
=== Season standings ===
| Eastern Conference | W | L | PCT | GB | Home | Road | Conf. |
|---|---|---|---|---|---|---|---|
| Detroit Shock ^{x} | 25 | 9 | .735 | – | 13–4 | 12–5 | 18–6 |
| Charlotte Sting ^{x} | 18 | 16 | .529 | 7.0 | 13–4 | 5–12 | 12–12 |
| Connecticut Sun ^{x} | 18 | 16 | .529 | 7.0 | 10–7 | 8–9 | 11–13 |
| Cleveland Rockers ^{x} | 17 | 17 | .500 | 8.0 | 11–6 | 6–11 | 13–11 |
| Indiana Fever ^{o} | 16 | 18 | .471 | 9.0 | 11–6 | 5–12 | 12–12 |
| New York Liberty ^{o} | 16 | 18 | .471 | 9.0 | 11–6 | 5–12 | 11–13 |
| Washington Mystics ^{o} | 9 | 25 | .265 | 16.0 | 3–14 | 6–11 | 7–17 |

=== Season schedule ===
| Date | Opponent | Score | Result | Record |
|---|---|---|---|---|
| 1 | May 23 | Washington | L 70–74 | 0–1 |
| 2 | May 29 | Indiana | W 66–57 | 1–1 |
| 3 | May 31 | @ Detroit | W 70–67 | 2–1 |
| 4 | June 4 | San Antonio | W 67–52 | 3–1 |
| 5 | June 6 | Houston | W 69–58 | 4–1 |
| 6 | June 7 | @ Cleveland | L 57–67 | 4–2 |
| 7 | June 12 | @ Phoenix | W 58–50 | 5–2 |
| 8 | June 14 | @ San Antonio | L 52–62 | 5–3 |
| 9 | June 17 | @ Indiana | L 60–71 | 5–4 |
| 10 | June 20 | Minnesota | W 76–72 | 6–4 |
| 11 | June 22 | @ New York | L 57–69 | 6–5 |
| 12 | June 25 | Cleveland | W 61–50 | 7–5 |
| 13 | June 28 | Connecticut | W 69–55 | 8–5 |
| 14 | June 30 | Seattle | L 71–83 | 8–6 |
| 15 | July 3 | @ Detroit | W 92–79 | 9–6 |
| 16 | July 5 | Sacramento | W 67–65 | 10–6 |
| 17 | July 7 | @ Washington | W 62–56 | 11–6 |
| 18 | July 10 | Detroit | W 65–58 | 12–6 |
| 19 | July 17 | @ Washington | L 60–68 | 12–7 |
| 20 | July 18 | @ New York | L 48–56 | 12–8 |
| 21 | July 20 | Cleveland | L 57–59 (OT) | 12–9 |
| 22 | July 24 | Detroit | W 67–61 | 13–9 |
| 23 | July 26 | @ Connecticut | L 70–74 | 13–10 |
| 24 | July 31 | @ Seattle | L 54–69 | 13–11 |
| 25 | August 2 | @ Los Angeles | W 84–73 | 14–11 |
| 26 | August 3 | @ Sacramento | L 60–76 | 14–12 |
| 27 | August 7 | New York | W 65–54 | 15–12 |
| 28 | August 9 | Connecticut | W 69–68 | 16–12 |
| 29 | August 14 | Washington | L 69–76 | 16–13 |
| 30 | August 16 | @ Indiana | L 63–69 | 16–14 |
| 31 | August 20 | Indiana | W 80–50 | 17–14 |
| 32 | August 22 | @ Connecticut | L 55–63 | 17–15 |
| 33 | August 24 | New York | W 61–59 (OT) | 18–15 |
| 34 | August 25 | @ Cleveland | L 66–75 | 18–16 |
| 1 | August 28 | @ Connecticut | L 66–68 | 0–1 |
| 2 | August 30 | Connecticut | L 62–68 | 0–2 |

== Player stats ==
| Player | Games Played | Rebounds | Assists | Steals | Blocks | Points |
|---|---|---|---|---|---|---|
| Allison Feaster | 34 | 113 | 73 | 52 | 9 | 422 |
| Andrea Stinson | 34 | 140 | 97 | 48 | 5 | 377 |
| Tammy Sutton-Brown | 34 | 201 | 15 | 19 | 50 | 286 |
| Dawn Staley | 34 | 58 | 174 | 49 | 4 | 269 |
| Shalonda Enis | 29 | 125 | 16 | 29 | 2 | 252 |
| Kelly Miller | 34 | 53 | 47 | 18 | 2 | 189 |
| Rushia Brown | 34 | 83 | 16 | 29 | 10 | 125 |
| Teana Miller | 31 | 91 | 6 | 14 | 24 | 105 |
| Charlotte Smith | 27 | 60 | 18 | 10 | 2 | 95 |
| Tynesha Lewis | 23 | 33 | 20 | 10 | 6 | 70 |
| Marla Brumfield | 25 | 10 | 14 | 1 | 1 | 18 |
| Erin Buescher | 14 | 4 | 3 | 0 | 0 | 9 |
