= 2003 Seattle Storm season =

- Head coach: Anne Donovan
- Arena: KeyArena

Results
- Record: 18–16 (.529)
- Place: 5th (Western)
- Playoff finish: Did not qualify

The 2003 WNBA season was the fourth for the Seattle Storm. The team almost made the playoffs, but they fell in a tiebreaker to the Minnesota Lynx.

== Offseason ==
=== Dispersal Draft ===
Pick	Player	Nationality	Former team
9	Alisa Burras (F)	United States	Portland Fire

=== WNBA draft ===
Round	Pick	Player	Nationality	College/School/Team
1	8	Jung Sun-min (C)	South Korea	Gwangju Sinsegye Coolcats (WKBL)
2	22	Suzy Batkovic (C)	Australia	Valenciennes (France)
3	37	Chrissy Floyd (G)	United States	Clemson

== Regular season ==
=== Season standings ===
Western Conference	W	L	PCT	GB	Home	Road	Conf.
Los Angeles Sparks ^{x}	24	10	.706	–	11–6	13–4	17–7
Houston Comets ^{x}	20	14	.588	4.0	14–3	6–11	14–10
Sacramento Monarchs ^{x}	19	15	.559	5.0	12–5	7–10	13–11
Minnesota Lynx ^{x}	18	16	.529	6.0	11–6	7–10	14–10
Seattle Storm ^{o}	18	16	.529	6.0	13–4	5–12	11–13
San Antonio Silver Stars ^{o}	12	22	.353	12.0	9–8	3–14	10–14
Phoenix Mercury ^{o}	8	26	.235	16.0	6–11	2–15	5–19

=== Season schedule ===
Game	Date	Opponent	Result	Record
1	May 22	@ Houston	L 64–75	0–1
2	May 24	@ San Antonio	L 56–65	0–2
3	May 30	Los Angeles	L 74–77 (OT)	0–3
4	June 3	Sacramento	W 70–56	1–3
5	June 7	Phoenix	W 66–57	2–3
6	June 10	Indiana	W 78–51	3–3
7	June 14	Minnesota	L 72–77	3-4
8	June 17	@ Phoenix	W 61–60	4–4
9	June 19	@ Los Angeles	W 69–67	5–4
10	June 21	@ Sacramento	L 64–69	5–5
11	June 22	San Antonio	W 93–53	6–5
12	June 27	@ Cleveland	W 71–59	7–5
13	June 28	@ Indiana	L 70–79	7–6
14	June 30	@ Charlotte	W 83–71	8–6
15	July 3	Washington	W 76–72	9–6
16	July 5	@ Los Angeles	L 75–84	9–7
17	July 15	Houston	W 69–55	10–7
18	July 17	@ Connecticut	W 67–65	11–7
19	July 18	@ Detroit	L 61–74	11–8
20	July 20	@ Minnesota	L 58–69	11–9
21	July 23	New York	W 75–65	12–9
22	July 25	Phoenix	W 82–53	13–9
23	July 26	@ Sacramento	L 63–76	13–10
24	July 31	Charlotte	W 69–54	14–10
25	August 2	@ Minnesota	L 71–73	14–11
26	August 6	Los Angeles	W 92–56	15–11
27	August 8	Minnesota	W 68–65	16–11
28	August 12	San Antonio	L 77–87	16–12
29	August 15	@ Phoenix	L 50–64	16–13
30	August 17	Detroit	L 86–95	16–14
31	August 19	@ Houston	L 47–52	16–15
32	August 20	@ San Antonio	L 70–78 (OT)	16–16
33	August 23	Houston	W 71–64	17–16
34	August 25	Sacramento	W 70–57	18–16

== Player stats ==
Player	GP	REB	AST	STL	BLK	PTS
Lauren Jackson	33	307	62	38	64	698
Sue Bird	34	113	221	48	1	420
Kamila Vodičková	28	143	31	20	21	284
Sandy Brondello	34	56	69	31	2	280
Amanda Lassiter	32	112	42	27	26	163
Simone Edwards	34	133	16	10	9	157
Alisa Burras	27	61	5	5	5	89
Adia Barnes	16	65	23	11	7	88
Rita Williams	32	22	41	14	0	78
Tully Bevilaqua	31	26	32	14	1	58
Tonya Washington	11	11	5	4	0	33
Jung Sun-Min	17	10	1	5	0	30
Mactabene Amachree	7	14	0	5	2	8
Danielle McCulley	7	1	0	0	0	2
