= 2003 Cleveland Rockers season =

- Head coach: Dan Hughes
- Arena: Gund Arena

Results
- Record: 17–17 (.500)
- Place: 4th (Eastern)
- Playoff finish: Lost First Round (2-1) to Detroit Shock

The 2003 WNBA season was the 7th and final season for the Cleveland Rockers franchise. The season saw the team reach the playoffs for the first time in two years. To date, they are the only to qualify for the WNBA Playoffs in their final season of play. The team disbanded after the season after no new ownership was found.

== Offseason ==
=== Dispersal Draft ===
Pick	Player	Nationality	Former team
3	Betty Lennox (G)	United States	Miami Sol

=== WNBA draft ===
Round	Pick	Player	Nationality	College/School/Team
1	1	LaToya Thomas (F)	United States	Mississippi State
2	15	Jennifer Butler (C)	United States	Massachusetts
3	30	Shaquala Williams (G)	United States	Oregon

== Regular season ==
=== Season standings ===
Eastern Conference	W	L	PCT	GB	Home	Road	Conf.
Detroit Shock ^{x}	25	9	.735	–	13–4	12–5	18–6
Charlotte Sting ^{x}	18	16	.529	7.0	13–4	5–12	12–12
Connecticut Sun ^{x}	18	16	.529	7.0	10–7	8–9	11–13
Cleveland Rockers ^{x}	17	17	.500	8.0	11–6	6–11	13–11
Indiana Fever ^{o}	16	18	.471	9.0	11–6	5–12	12–12
New York Liberty ^{o}	16	18	.471	9.0	11–6	5–12	11–13
Washington Mystics ^{o}	9	25	.265	16.0	3–14	6–11	7–17

=== Season schedule ===
Game	Date	Opponent	Result	Record
1	May 27	Los Angeles	L 71–79	0–1
2	May 31	New York	W 74–50	1–1
3	June 6	@ Washington	W 63–53	2–1
4	June 7	Charlotte	W 67–57	3–1
5	June 10	@ New York	L 65–73	3–2
6	June 14	Connecticut	W 84–56	4–2
7	June 18	@ Connecticut	L 57–70	4–3
8	June 20	Washington	W 79–74	5–3
9	June 21	@ Houston	L 62–63	5–4
10	June 25	@ Charlotte	L 50–61	5–5
11	June 27	Seattle	L 59–71	5–6
12	June 29	Indiana	W 66–53	6–6
13	July 2	@ Connecticut	L 57–64	6–7
14	July 5	@ Minnesota	W 79–71	7–7
15	July 7	@ Los Angeles	L 75–81	7–8
16	July 10	@ Phoenix	W 68–67	8–8
17	July 15	Sacramento	L 57–66	8–9
18	July 17	Minnesota	W 70–61	9–9
19	July 19	Detroit	L 57–58	9–10
20	July 20	@ Charlotte	W 59–57 (OT)	10–10
21	July 22	@ Detroit	L 71–74	10–11
22	July 26	Washington	W 89–78	11–11
23	July 27	@ San Antonio	L 55–64	11–12
24	July 29	Detroit	L 65–77	11–13
25	August 1	Phoenix	W 73–56	12–13
26	August 3	@ New York	L 48–60	12–14
27	August 9	@ Indiana	W 66–62	13–14
28	August 10	Indiana	W 71–67	14–14
29	August 16	@ Washington	W 72–68	15–14
30	August 17	New York	L 54–71	15–15
31	August 19	Connecticut	W 69–52	16–15
32	August 21	@ Detroit	L 56–71	16–16
33	August 23	@ Indiana	L 46–59	16–17
34	August 25	Charlotte	W 75–66	17–17
1	August 29	Detroit	L 74–76	0–1
2	August 31	@ Detroit	W 66–59	1–1
3	September 2	@ Detroit	L 63–77	1–2

== Player stats ==
Player	Games Played	Rebounds	Assists	Steals	Blocks	Points
Chasity Melvin	34	215	52	28	22	444
Penny Taylor	34	148	80	38	10	398
LaToya Thomas	32	164	37	28	13	345
Betty Lennox	34	89	32	14	4	258
Deanna Jackson	34	89	51	20	13	245
Merlakia Jones	34	97	44	22	3	164
Helen Darling	34	87	128	39	6	141
Pollyanna Johns Kimbrough	30	82	19	12	10	89
Lucienne Berthieu	22	42	6	10	4	84
Jennifer Rizzotti	33	42	65	14	0	59
Tracy Henderson	11	14	3	1	1	2
