= List of all-time WNBA win–loss records =

The Women's National Basketball Association (WNBA) was founded in 1996 and began play in 1997. The WNBA has kept a record of its win–loss statistics since its inception. There are currently 15 teams that play in the WNBA, and there are also six defunct WNBA teams accounted for in the league's win–loss records.

Of the WNBA's eight inaugural teams, four remain active: the Las Vegas Aces, Los Angeles Sparks, New York Liberty, and the Phoenix Mercury. (Note: The Los Angeles Sparks, New York Liberty, and Phoenix Mercury all began play in 1997. As the Aces were founded in 1997 as the Utah Starzz (and later relocated to San Antonio, and then again to Las Vegas), they are also considered one of the WNBA's inaugural franchises.) The Las Vegas Aces, Los Angeles Sparks, New York Liberty, and the Phoenix Mercury have all played the most games played in WNBA history, with 1,022. The Toronto Tempo and Portland Fire have each played the least games played in WNBA history, with 40.

As of the 2026 WNBA season, the Golden State Valkyries hold the highest winning percentage among active teams, at 55–33 (.625). Meanwhile, the Toronto Tempo hold the lowest winning percentage, with a 11–33 (.250) record. When considering defunct franchises, the Houston Comets have the highest winning percentage at 241–149 (.618) and the Portland Fire have the lowest with a 37–59 (.385) record. The Sparks hold the record for most wins (566), while the Wings have the most losses (564).

In regards to playoff win–loss records, as of the 2026 WNBA Finals, the Golden State Valkyries have the highest winning percentage, with a 9–6 (.600) record. The Washington Mystics hold the lowest winning percentage among active franchises, with an 18–36 (.333) record. Meanwhile, the Phoenix Mercury hold the record for most playoff games played (101) while the Minnesota Lynx hold the record for most playoff wins with (53). The New York Liberty have the most losses (51) in WNBA playoff history. The defunct Portland Fire are the only WNBA franchise to have never qualified for the playoffs, meaning they rank as the team with the fewest playoff games played, wins, and losses (all at 0). Meanwhile, the Charlotte Sting have the lowest all-time playoff win–loss record, at 6–13 (.316), when considering defunct franchises.

== Active franchises ==
=== Regular season ===
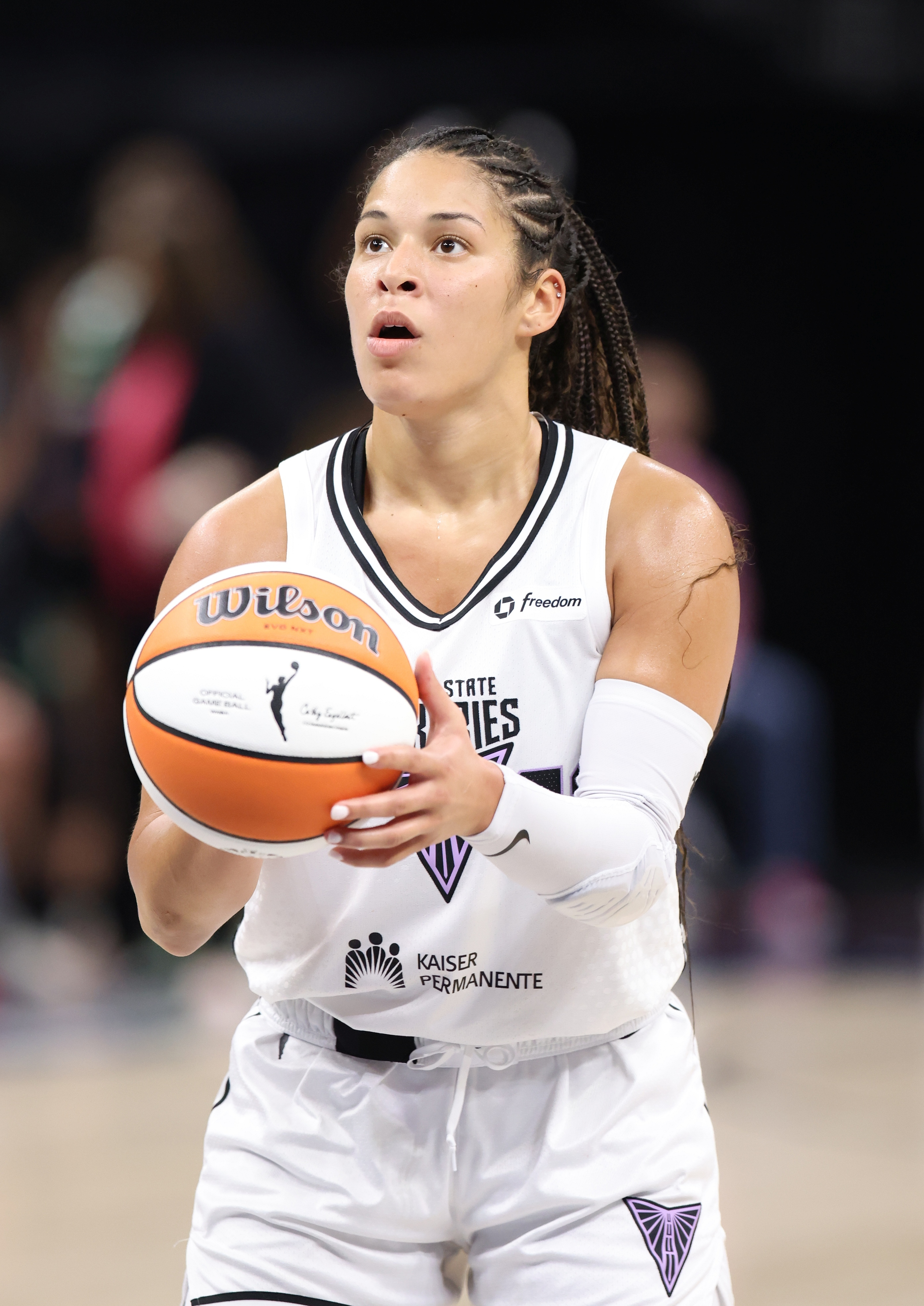
Veronica Burton of the Golden State Valkyries, the team with the highest winning percentage among active WNBA franchises.

Rank	Team	GP	Won	Lost	Pct.	First season	Notes
1	Golden State Valkyries	88	55	33	.625	2025	
2	Minnesota Lynx	964	549	415	.570	1999	
3	Los Angeles Sparks	1,022	567	455	.555	1997	
4	Connecticut Sun	964	521	443	.540	1999	(Note: The Connecticut Sun played as the Orlando Miracle (1999–2002), prior to their relocation to Connecticut and rebranding as the Sun.)
5	New York Liberty	1,022	535	487	.523	1997	
6	Seattle Storm	932	475	457	.510	2000	
7	Las Vegas Aces	1,022	516	506	.505	1997	(Note: The Las Vegas Aces began play in 1997 as the Utah Starzz. After their 2002 season, they relocated to San Antonio, where they played as the San Antonio Silver Stars from 2003–2013. They then rebranded as simply the San Antonio Stars, which they played as from 2014–2017, before relocating to Las Vegas. Since 2018, they have played as the Las Vegas Aces.)
8	Phoenix Mercury	1,022	511	511	.500	1997	
9	Atlanta Dream	666	314	352	.471	2008	
10	Indiana Fever	932	431	501	.462	2000	
11	Washington Mystics	994	441	553	.444	1998	
12	Chicago Sky	734	323	411	.440	2006	
13	Dallas Wings	994	429	565	.432	1998	(Note: The Dallas Wings began play in 1998 as the Detroit Shock. Ahead of their 2010 season, the relocated to Tulsa but retained the Shock moniker and played as the Tulsa Shock through 2015. They then relocated to Dallas, and rebranded as the Dallas Wings, which they have played as since 2016.)
14	Portland Fire	44	17	27	.386	2026	
15	Toronto Tempo	44	11	33	.250	2026	
Records accurate as of the 2026 WNBA season, and gathered from Basketball-Reference.com.

=== Playoffs ===
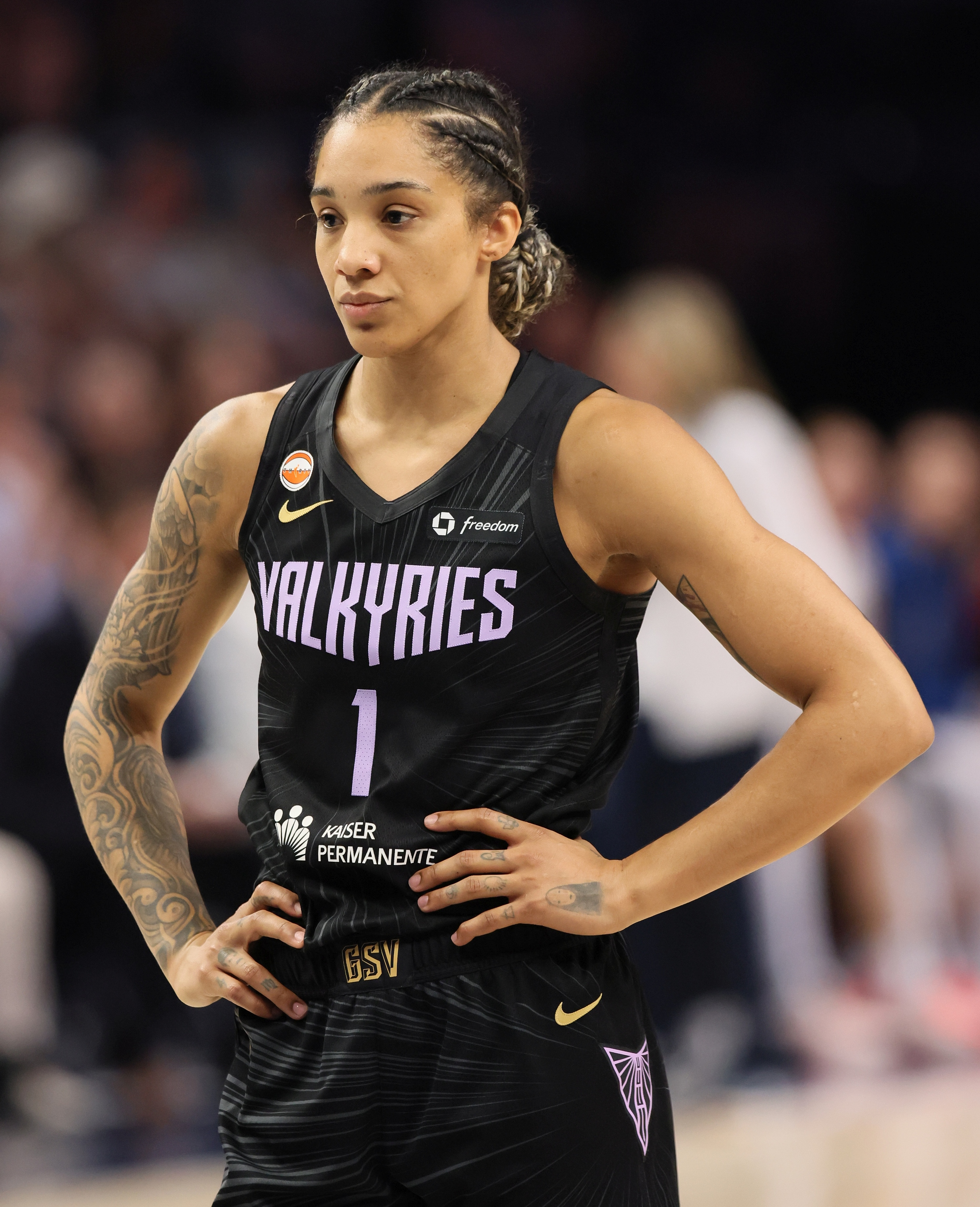
Gabby Williams with the Golden State Valkyries, the winningest team in WNBA playoff history

Rank	Team	GP	Won	Lost	Pct.	Last playoff appearance
1	Golden State Valkyries	15	9	6	.600	2026
2	Minnesota Lynx	90	53	37	.589	2026
3	Dallas Wings	65	34	31	.523	2026
4	Los Angeles Sparks	90	47	43	.522	2020
5	Seattle Storm	69	36	33	.548	2025
6	Phoenix Mercury	101	52	49	.515	2025
7	Connecticut Sun	88	44	44	.500	2024
8	Las Vegas Aces	94	47	47	.500	2026
9	Indiana Fever	81	40	41	.494	2026
10	Chicago Sky	42	20	22	.476	2023
11	New York Liberty	96	45	51	.469	2026
12	Atlanta Dream	57	26	31	.456	2026
13	Washington Mystics	54	18	36	.333	2026
Records are accurate as of the end of the 2026 WNBA Finals and gathered from Basketball-Reference.com.

== Defunct franchises ==
=== Regular season ===
Rank	Team	GP	Won	Lost	Pct.	Seasons played
1	Houston Comets	390	241	149	.618	1997–2008
2	Sacramento Monarchs	424	224	200	.528	1997–2009
3	Miami Sol	96	48	48	.500	2000–2002
4	Cleveland Rockers	220	108	112	.491	1997–2003
5	Charlotte Sting	322	143	179	.444	1997–2006
6	Portland Fire	96	37	59	.385	2000–2002
Records gathered from Basketball-Reference.com.

=== Playoffs ===
Rank	Team	GP	Won	Lost	Pct.	Total appearances
1	Houston Comets	34	20	14	.588	9 (1997–2003, 2005, 2006)
2	Sacramento Monarchs	43	24	19	.558	9 (1999–2001, 2003–2009)
3	Cleveland Rockers	15	6	9	.400	4 (1998, 2000, 2001, 2003)
4	Miami Sol	3	1	2	.333	1 (2001)
5	Charlotte Sting	19	6	13	.316	6 (1997–1999, 2001–2003)
6	Portland Fire	0	0	0	–	0 (never qualified)
Records gathered from Basketball-Reference.com.

== See also ==
- List of all-time NBA win–loss records
- List of WNBA playoff series
