= 2003 Detroit Shock season =

- WNBA champions
- Head coach: Bill Laimbeer
- Arena: The Palace of Auburn Hills

Results
- Record: 25–9 (.735)
- Place: 1st (Eastern)
- Playoff finish: Won WNBA Finals

The 2003 WNBA season was the sixth for the Detroit Shock. The Shock won the WNBA Finals for the first time in franchise history. This season was better known as, "From Worst To First".

== Offseason ==
=== Dispersal Draft ===
Pick	Player	Nationality	Team	Previous team
1	Ruth Riley (C)	United States	Detroit Shock	(from Duke)

=== WNBA draft ===
Cheryl Ford (daughter of NBA great Karl Malone) helped the Detroit Shock win a WNBA Championship in her first season.

Pick	Player	Nationality	School
3rd	Cheryl Ford		
5th	Kara Lawson		
28th	Syreeta Bromfield		

== Regular season ==
=== Season standings ===
Eastern Conference	W	L	PCT	GB	Home	Road	Conf.
Detroit Shock ^{x}	25	9	.735	–	13–4	12–5	18–6
Charlotte Sting ^{x}	18	16	.529	7.0	13–4	5–12	12–12
Connecticut Sun ^{x}	18	16	.529	7.0	10–7	8–9	11–13
Cleveland Rockers ^{x}	17	17	.500	8.0	11–6	6–11	13–11
Indiana Fever ^{o}	16	18	.471	9.0	11–6	5–12	12–12
New York Liberty ^{o}	16	18	.471	9.0	11–6	5–12	11–13
Washington Mystics ^{o}	9	25	.265	16.0	3–14	6–11	7–17

=== Season schedule ===
Game	Date	Opponent	Result	Record
1	May 31	Charlotte	L 67–70	0–1
2	June 5	Connecticut	W 103–89	1–1
3	June 7	@ San Antonio	W 74–55	2-1
4	June 14	@ Washington	W 93–56	3–1
5	June 17	Los Angeles	W 87–78 (OT)	4–1
6	June 20	New York	W 88–83	5–1
7	June 22	@ Connecticut	W 82–73 (OT)	6–1
8	June 24	Indiana	W 68–60	7–1
9	June 27	@ New York	W 75–69	8–1
10	June 28	Phoenix	L 65–68	8–2
11	July 1	San Antonio	W 99–88	9–2
12	July 3	Charlotte	L 79–92	9–3
13	July 6	@ Indiana	L 54–85	9–4
14	July 8	Connecticut	W 66–50	10–4
15	July 8	@ Charlotte	L 58–65	10–5
16	July 16	@ Indiana	W 70–68	11–5
17	July 18	Seattle	W 74–61	12–5
18	July 19	@ Cleveland	W 58–57	13–5
19	July 22	Cleveland	W 74–71	14–5
20	July 24	@ Charlotte	L 61–67	14–6
21	July 27	Washington	W 81–71	15–6
22	July 29	@ Cleveland	W 77–65	16–6
23	August 1	@ New York	W 62–60	17–6
24	August 2	Indiana	W 78–58	18–6
25	August 5	@ Connecticut	W 78–61	19–6
26	August 6	@ Washington	L 81–92	19–7
27	August 8	Houston	L 56–66	19–8
28	Aug 10	New York	W 90–87 (OT)	20–8
29	August 13	@ Phoenix	W 78–76	21-8
30	August 15	@ Sacramento	L 63–75	21–9
31	August 17	@ Seattle	W 95–86	22–9
32	August 21	Cleveland	W 71–56	23–9
33	August 23	@ Minnesota	W 86–77 (OT)	24–9
34	August 25	Washington	W 68–60	25–9

== Player stats ==
Note: GP= Games played; FG = Field Goals; MIN= Minutes; REB= Rebounds; AST= Assists; STL = Steals; BLK = Blocks; PTS = Points

Player	GP	MIN	FG	REB	AST	STL	BLK	PTS
Swin Cash	33	1097	195	193	119	43	23	548
Deanna Nolan								396
Cheryl Ford								344
Ruth Riley								327
Kedra Holland-Corn								312
Elaine Powell								296
Barbara Farris								127
Sheila Lambert								87
Ayana Walker								56
Tamara Moore								21
Astou Ndiaye-Diatta								20
Stacey Thomas								15
Petra Ujhelyi	14	68	2	12	3	0	1	4

== Playoffs ==
Game	Date	Opponent	Result	Record
1	August 29	@ Cleveland	W 76–74	1–0
2	August 31	Cleveland	L 59–66	1–1
3	September 2	Cleveland	W 76–74	2–1
1	September 5	@ Connecticut	W 73–63	1–0
2	September 7	Connecticut	W 79-73	2–0
1	September 12	@ Los Angeles	L 63–75	0–1
2	September 14	Los Angeles	W 62–61	1–1
3	September 16	Los Angeles	W 83–78	2–1

== Awards and honors ==
- Ruth Riley, WNBA Finals MVP Award
- Cheryl Ford, WNBA Rookie of the Year Award
- Bill Laimbeer, WNBA Coach of the Year Award
