= Octavia Blue =

American basketball player (born 1976)

Penn State Lady Lions
- Title: Assistant coach
- League: Big Ten Conference

Personal information
- Born: April 18, 1976 (age 50) Fort Lauderdale, Florida, U.S.
- Listed height: 6 ft 1 in (1.85 m)
- Listed weight: 163 lb (74 kg)

Career information
- High school: Nova (Davie, Florida)
- College: Miami (FL) (1994–1998)
- WNBA draft: 1998: 2nd round, 15th overall pick
- Drafted by: Los Angeles Sparks
- Playing career: 1998–2004
- Position: Forward
- Number: 20, 31

Career history

Playing
- 1998: Los Angeles Sparks
- 2003–2004: Houston Comets

Coaching
- 2008–2009: St. John's (assistant)
- 2009–2012: Georgia Tech (assistant)
- 2012–2020: Miami (FL) (assistant)
- 2020–2021: Miami (FL) (associate HC)
- 2021–2026: Kennesaw State
- 2026–present: Penn State (assistant)

Career highlights
- First-team All-Big East (1998); Big East All-Freshman Team (1995)
- Stats at Basketball Reference

Octavia Blue (born April 18, 1976) is an American former women's basketball player with the Los Angeles Sparks and Houston Comets of the Women's National Basketball Association (WNBA). She played during the 1998, 2003 and 2004 seasons. She was recently the head coach for the Kennesaw State Owls women's basketball team.

== Coaching career ==
Blue's first foray into coaching was as an assistant coach at St. John's in 2008. She was responsible, among other things, for the development of post players, contributing to St. John's player Dashena Stevens earning the Big East rookie of the year award for 2008–09. Blue remained at St. John's for one season before taking a position as an assistant coach at Georgia Tech. After three years at Georgia Tech, Katie Meier offered Blue a position as an assistant coach at Miami.

Working primarily with post players, Blue coached eight players to a total of ten All-ACC recognitions in her eight seasons at Miami, including six first-team accolades and two All-ACC Defensive Team honors. Over her final two seasons at Miami, Blue worked closely with 2020 graduate Beatrice Mompremier, who earned AP and WBCA All-America recognition in back-to-back seasons. Mompremier was a finalist for the Lisa Leslie Center of the Year Award in both 2019 and 2020 and was recognized as ACC Preseason Player of the Year ahead of the 2019-20 campaign. During Blue's time at Miami, five players signed WNBA contracts, including Mompremier, who was selected 20th overall in the 2020 WNBA Draft by the Los Angeles Sparks. In total, 14 Hurricanes coached by Blue have gone on to play professionally. She received a promotion to associate head coach in the fall of 2020.

In April 2021, Blue was named the head coach of Kennesaw State. She remained with the team for five years before taking an assistant coaching job at Penn State.

== Playing career ==
During her collegiate career, Blue played for Miami, amassing 1,724 points on the court from 1994–98.

She was selected 15th by the Los Angeles Sparks in the 1998 WNBA draft, becoming Miami's 1st WNBA draft pick. During the 1999 expansion draft on April 6, 1999, Blue was selected by the Minnesota Lynx.

== Career statistics ==
Legend
GP	Games played	GS	Games started	MPG	Minutes per game	RPG	Rebounds per game
APG	Assists per game	SPG	Steals per game	BPG	Blocks per game	PPG	Points per game
TO	Turnovers per game	FG%	Field-goal percentage	3P%	3-point field-goal percentage	FT%	Free-throw percentage
**Bold**	Career best	°	League leader

=== WNBA ===
==== Regular season ====
Year	Team	GP	GS	MPG	FG%	3P%	FT%	RPG	APG	SPG	BPG	TO	PPG
1998	Los Angeles	**30**	**3**	11.0	33.8	**28.6**	62.5	**1.6**	0.3	**0.4**	**0.1**	0.9	2.4
1999	Did not play (waived)												
2000	Did not play (did not appear in WNBA)												
2001	Did not play (did not appear in WNBA)												
2002	Did not play (did not appear in WNBA)												
2003	Houston	16	0	2.3	25.0	0.0	50.0	0.1	0.1	0.0	0.0	**0.1**	0.3
2004	Houston	13	**3**	**11.9**	**38.1**	0.0	**92.3**	**1.6**	**0.4**	0.1	0.0	0.5	**3.4**
Career	3 years, 2 teams	59	6	8.9	35.0	24.0	70.7	1.2	0.3	0.2	0.1	0.6	2.1

==== Playoffs ====
Year	Team	GP	GS	MPG	FG%	3P%	FT%	RPG	APG	SPG	BPG	TO	PPG
2003	Houston	1	0	4.0	0.0	0.0	0.0	0.0	1.0	0.0	0.0	2.0	0.0
Career	1 year, 1 team	1	0	4.0	0.0	0.0	0.0	0.0	1.0	0.0	0.0	2.0	0.0

=== College ===
Year	Team	GP	GS	MPG	FG%	3P%	FT%	RPG	APG	SPG	BPG	TO	PPG
1994–95	Miami (FL)	24	-	-	38.6	0.0	65.3	**7.2**	0.6	**1.3**	**0.8**	-	14.5
1995–96	Miami (FL)	27	-	-	**48.8**	0.0	56.7	6.4	1.0	**1.3**	0.2	-	16.0
1996–97	Miami (FL)	**29**	-	-	42.1	0.0	64.7	5.6	**2.6**	**1.3**	0.2	-	13.4
1997–98	Miami (FL)	**29**	-	-	45.8	**45.3**	**72.2**	5.7	0.8	1.2	0.3	-	**19.2**
**Career**		109	-	-	44.0	42.9	65.2	6.2	1.3	1.3	0.3	-	15.8
Statistics retrieved from Sports-Reference.
