= Lucienne Berthieu =

French-Cameroonian basketball player (born 1978)

Personal information
- Born: March 31, 1978 (age 48) Douala, Cameroon
- Listed height: 6 ft 2 in (1.88 m)

Career information
- College: Old Dominion University (1998–2002)
- WNBA draft: 2002: 2nd round, 19th overall pick
- Drafted by: Seattle Storm
- Position: Forward-Center

Career history
- 2002–2003: Cleveland Rockers
- 2004: Houston Comets
- Stats at Basketball Reference

Lucienne Claudine Berthieu-Poiraud (born March 31, 1978, in Douala, Cameroon) is a French-Cameroonian women's basketball player. She played in the WNBA in the United States from 2002 to 2004 with the Cleveland Rockers and Houston Comets.

She played college basketball at Old Dominion University and internationally for France.

== Career statistics ==
Legend
GP	Games played	GS	Games started	MPG	Minutes per game	RPG	Rebounds per game
APG	Assists per game	SPG	Steals per game	BPG	Blocks per game	PPG	Points per game
TO	Turnovers per game	FG%	Field-goal percentage	3P%	3-point field-goal percentage	FT%	Free-throw percentage
**Bold**	Career best	°	League leader

=== WNBA ===
==== Regular season ====
WNBA regular season statistics
Year	Team	GP	GS	MPG	FG%	3P%	FT%	RPG	APG	SPG	BPG	TO	PPG
2002	Cleveland	5	0	3.2	.429	.000	.500	0.8	0.0	0.0	0.0	**0.0**	1.6
2003	Cleveland	**22**	**4**	**9.1**	**.519**	.000	.652	**1.9**	**0.3**	**0.5**	**0.2**	1.0	**3.8**
2004	Houston	16	0	8.4	.353	—	**.722**	1.7	**0.3**	0.4	0.1	0.6	2.3
**Career**	3 years, 2 teams	43	4	8.2	.452	.000	.662	1.7	0.2	0.4	0.1	0.7	3.0

==== Playoffs ====
WNBA playoff statistics
Year	Team	GP	GS	MPG	FG%	3P%	FT%	RPG	APG	SPG	BPG	TO	PPG
2003	Cleveland	3	0	4.3	.222	—	—	1.3	0.3	0.3	0.3	0.7	1.3
**Career**	1 year, 1 team	3	0	4.3	.222	—	—	1.3	0.3	0.3	0.3	0.7	1.3

=== College ===
NCAA statistics
Year	Team	GP	GS	MPG	FG%	3P%	FT%	RPG	APG	SPG	BPG	TO	PPG
1998–99	Old Dominion	31			**.614**	.000	.536	7.9	0.6	**1.9**	0.7		14.2
1999–00	Old Dominion	26			.607	—	**.631**	**8.9**	**1.4**	1.8	**1.0**		**17.8**
2000–01	Did not play												
2001–02	Old Dominion	**34**			.589	—	.582	7.6	1.2	**1.9**	0.6		14.0
**Career**		91	—	—	.603	.000	.588	8.1	1.1	1.9	0.7	—	15.2
