= Sheila Lambert =

American basketball player (born 1980)

Personal information
- Born: July 21, 1980 (age 46) Seattle, Washington, U.S.
- Listed height: 5 ft 7 in (1.70 m)

Career information
- High school: Chief Sealth (Seattle, Washington)
- College: Baylor (2000–2002)
- WNBA draft: 2002: 1st round, 7th overall pick
- Drafted by: Charlotte Sting
- Position: Guard

Career history
- 2002: Charlotte Sting
- 2003: Detroit Shock
- 2004: Houston Comets
- 2005: Detroit Shock

Career highlights
- WNBA Champion (2003); Frances Pomeroy Naismith Award (2002); Kodak All-American (2002); Third-team All-American – AP (2002); First-team All-Big 12 (2001, 2002)
- Stats at Basketball Reference

Sheila Monique Lambert (born July 21, 1980) is an American former basketball player who played in the WNBA. Born in Seattle, Washington, she was the seventh pick in the 2002 WNBA draft. She was a member of the WNBA Championship Detroit Shock in 2003.

== Career statistics ==
Legend
GP	Games played	GS	Games started	MPG	Minutes per game	RPG	Rebounds per game
APG	Assists per game	SPG	Steals per game	BPG	Blocks per game	PPG	Points per game
TO	Turnovers per game	FG%	Field-goal percentage	3P%	3-point field-goal percentage	FT%	Free-throw percentage
**Bold**	Career best	°	League leader

†	Denotes season(s) in which Lambert won a WNBA championship

=== WNBA ===
==== Regular season ====
WNBA regular season statistics
Year	Team	GP	GS	MPG	FG%	3P%	FT%	RPG	APG	SPG	BPG	TO	PPG
2002	Charlotte	3	0	5.3	33.3	0.0	0.0	1.0	1.0	0.3	0.0	**0.7**	0.7
2003†	Detroit	27	1	6.9	36.4	**43.8**	78.0	1.0	0.5	0.2	0.0	1.1	3.2
2004	Houston	**34**	**25**	**23.2**	**42.4**	25.9	78.4	**2.0**	**2.6**	**0.8**	**0.1**	2.4	**5.8**
2005	Detroit	12	5	12.7	31.1	14.3	**80.0**	1.4	1.8	0.7	**0.1**	2.0	2.8
**Career**	4 years, 3 teams	76	31	15.0	39.2	30.0	78.4	1.5	1.7	0.5	0.1	1.8	4.2

==== Playoffs ====
WNBA playoffs statistics
Year	Team	GP	GS	MPG	FG%	3P%	FT%	RPG	APG	SPG	BPG	TO	PPG
2003†	Detroit	7	0	2.0	33.3	33.3	0.0	0.3	0.1	0.0	0.0	0.6	0.7
**Career**	1 year, 1 team	7	0	2.0	33.3	33.3	0.0	0.3	0.1	0.0	0.0	0.6	0.7

=== College ===
NCAA statistics
Year	Team	GP	Points	FG%	3P%	FT%	RPG	APG	SPG	BPG	PPG
2000–01	Baylor	30	**662**	40.4%	25.4%	75.5%	**5.6**	6.1	3.0	0.3	**22.1**°
2001–02	Baylor	**33**	653	**49.0%**	**31.6%**	**76.3%**	4.4	**6.5**	**3.2**	**0.5**	19.8
**Career**		63	1315	44.4%	27.4%	75.9%	5.0	6.3	3.1	0.4	20.9

== Personal life ==
Lambert majored in telecommunications at Baylor University. Prior to this she played for the Grayson College Lady Vikings under Bill Brock. She was an all American there. Brock then moved to Baylor as Assistant Coach.
