= Shaunzinski Gortman =

American basketball player (born 1979)

Personal information
- Born: December 7, 1979 (age 46) Columbia, South Carolina, U.S.
- Listed height: 5 ft 10 in (1.78 m)

Career information
- High school: Keenan (Columbia, South Carolina)
- College: South Carolina (1998–2002)
- WNBA draft: 2002: 1st round, 9th overall pick
- Drafted by: Charlotte Sting
- Position: Guard

Career history
- 2002–2003: Minnesota Lynx
- 2004: Washington Mystics
- 2006: Seattle Storm

Career highlights
- First-team All-SEC (2002)
- Stats at Basketball Reference

Shaunzinski Toronnie Gortman (born December 7, 1979) is an American former professional women's basketball player for the WNBA. Born in Columbia, South Carolina, she was the ninth pick in the 2002 WNBA draft.

== South Carolina statistics ==
Legend
GP	Games played	GS	Games started	MPG	Minutes per game
FG%	Field goal percentage	3P%	3-point field goal percentage	FT%	Free throw percentage
RPG	Rebounds per game	APG	Assists per game	SPG	Steals per game
BPG	Blocks per game	PPG	Points per game	**Bold**	Career high

Year	Team	GP	Points	FG%	3P%	FT%	RPG	APG	SPG	BPG	PPG
1998–99	South Carolina	27	301	37.6%	21.4%	58.9%	5.1	2.3	1.7	0.1	11.1
1999–2000	South Carolina	20	296	**46.8%**	**38.2%**	60.0%	5.6	4.2	**2.6**	**0.9**	14.8
2000–01	South Carolina	27	298	38.2%	32.4%	**70.2%**	5.1	3.0	1.9	0.4	11.0
2001–02	South Carolina	**31**	**472**	42.5%	36.4%	66.7%	**6.1**	**3.0**	2.0	0.2	**15.2**
Career	South Carolina	105	1367	41.1%	32.8%	63.5%	5.5	3.0	2.0	0.4	13.0

== WNBA career statistics ==
Legend
GP	Games played	GS	Games started	MPG	Minutes per game	RPG	Rebounds per game
APG	Assists per game	SPG	Steals per game	BPG	Blocks per game	PPG	Points per game
TO	Turnovers per game	FG%	Field-goal percentage	3P%	3-point field-goal percentage	FT%	Free-throw percentage
**Bold**	Career best	°	League leader

=== Regular season ===
Year	Team	GP	GS	MPG	FG%	3P%	FT%	RPG	APG	SPG	BPG	TO	PPG
2002	Minnesota	**29**	**2**	12.7	.361	**.326**	**.778**	2.1	0.7	0.4	0.2	0.9	**3.1**
2003	Minnesota	24	0	8.3	**.438**	.263	.750	1.3	0.6	0.4	0.0	0.8	2.1
2004	Washington	4	0	6.0	.000	.000	.000	1.0	0.5	0.0	**0.3**	0.5	0.0
2006	Seattle	20	0	**13.2**	.364	.167	**.778**	**2.4**	**0.9**	**0.6'**	0.1	1.3	2.8
Career	4 years, 3 teams	77	2	11.1	.380	.284	.774	1.9	0.7	0.4	0.1	0.9	2.6

=== Playoffs ===
Year	Team	GP	GS	MPG	FG%	3P%	FT%	RPG	APG	SPG	BPG	TO	PPG
2004	Washington	1	0	2.0	.000	.000	.000	0.0	0.0	0.0	0.0	0.0	0.0
Career	1 year, 1 team	1	0	2.0	.000	.000	.000	0.0	0.0	0.0	0.0	0.0	0.0
