= Courtney Coleman =

American basketball player (born 1981)

Personal information
- Born: April 13, 1981 (age 45) Cincinnati, Ohio, U.S.
- Listed height: 6 ft 0 in (1.83 m)

Career information
- High school: Hughes STEM (Cincinnati, Ohio)
- College: Ohio State (1999–2003)
- WNBA draft: 2003: 2nd round, 13th overall pick
- Drafted by: Connecticut Sun
- Position: Forward
- Number: 15

Career history
- 2003: Connecticut Sun

Career highlights
- 3× Second-team All-Big Ten (2001–2003)
- Stats at Basketball Reference

Courtney Michelle Coleman (born April 13, 1981) is an American former professional basketball player who played for the Connecticut Sun of the WNBA.

== Ohio State statistics ==
Legend
GP	Games played	GS	Games started	MPG	Minutes per game	FG%	Field goal percentage
3P%	3-point field goal percentage	FT%	Free throw percentage	RPG	Rebounds per game	APG	Assists per game
SPG	Steals per game	BPG	Blocks per game	TO	Turnovers per game	PPG	Points per game
**Bold**	Career high	*	Led Division I

=== College ===
Year	Team	GP	GS	MPG	FG%	3P%	FT%	RPG	APG	SPG	BPG	TO	PPG
[1999–00	Ohio State	28	-	-	50.0	0.0	**60.0**	3.3	0.1	0.8	**0.1'**	-	5.2
[2000–01	Ohio State	**33**	-	-	58.0	0.0	58.9	7.5	0.5	-	0.3	-	14.8
[2001–02	Ohio State	28	-	-	60.8	0.0	53.6	**7.8**	1.0	**1.2**	0.3	-	**16.4**
[2002–03	Ohio State	32	-	31.9	**66.2***	0.0	59.9	6.7	**1.5**	1.1	0.2	3.0	14.1
**Career**		121	-	31.9	60.3	0.0	57.6	6.4	0.8	1.0	0.2	3.0	12.7
Statistics retrieved from Sports-Reference.

== Career statistics ==
Legend
GP	Games played	GS	Games started	MPG	Minutes per game	RPG	Rebounds per game
APG	Assists per game	SPG	Steals per game	BPG	Blocks per game	PPG	Points per game
TO	Turnovers per game	FG%	Field-goal percentage	3P%	3-point field-goal percentage	FT%	Free-throw percentage
**Bold**	Career best	°	League leader

=== Regular season ===
Year	Team	GP	GS	MPG	FG%	3P%	FT%	RPG	APG	SPG	BPG	TO	PPG
2003	Minnesota	20	0	7.1	.550	.000	.467	1.1	0.1	0.4	0.1	0.7	1.8
