= 2004 Houston Comets season =

- Head coach: Van Chancellor
- Arena: Toyota Center

Results
- Record: 13–21 (.382)
- Place: 6th (Western)
- Playoff finish: Did not qualify

The 2004 WNBA season was the eighth season for the Houston Comets. The Comets missed the playoffs for the first time in franchise history.

== Offseason ==
=== Dispersal Draft ===
Based on the Comets' 2003 record, they would pick 8th and 11th in the Cleveland Rockers dispersal draft. The Comets picked Pollyanna Johns Kimbrough and Lucienne Berthieu.

=== WNBA draft ===
Round	Pick	Player	Nationality	College/School/Team
2	26	Lindsay Taylor (C)	United States	UC-Santa Barbara
3	37	Stacy Stephens (C)	United States	Texas

== Regular season ==
=== Season standings ===
Western Conference	W	L	PCT	GB	Home	Road	Conf.
Los Angeles Sparks ^{x}	25	9	.735	–	15–2	10–7	16–6
Seattle Storm ^{x}	20	14	.588	5.0	13–4	7–10	13–9
Minnesota Lynx ^{x}	18	16	.529	7.0	11–6	7–10	12–10
Sacramento Monarchs ^{x}	18	16	.529	7.0	10–7	8–9	12–10
Phoenix Mercury ^{o}	17	17	.500	8.0	10–7	7–10	11–11
Houston Comets ^{o}	13	21	.382	12.0	9–8	4–13	7–15
San Antonio Silver Stars ^{o}	9	25	.265	16.0	6–11	3–14	6–16

=== Season schedule ===
Date	Opponent	Score	Result	Record
May 20	San Antonio	55-64	Loss	0-1
May 21	@ Charlotte	60-53	Win	1-1
May 23	@ New York	62-68	Loss	1-2
May 25	@ Connecticut	68-57	Win	2-2
May 30	Sacramento	63-57	Win	3-2
June 1	@ Phoenix	63-73	Loss	3-3
June 3	New York	62-71	Loss	3-4
June 5	Los Angeles	75-71	Win	4-4
June 9	San Antonio	59-47	Win	5-4
June 12	@ San Antonio	69-66 (OT)	Win	6-4
June 18	Seattle	63-69	Loss	6-5
June 19	@ Minnesota	58-66	Loss	6-6
June 22	@ Seattle	63-57	Win	7-6
June 25	@ Sacramento	55-61	Loss	7-7
June 27	Washington	72-67	Win	8-7
June 30	@ Minnesota	50-58 (OT)	Loss	8-8
July 3	Charlotte	55-62	Loss	8-9
July 6	@ Detroit	63-82	Loss	8-10
July 10	Los Angeles	56-59	Loss	8-11
July 14	@ Indiana	62-70	Loss	8-12
July 15	Detroit	97-61	Win	9-12
July 17	Connecticut	72-56	Win	10-12
July 23	@ Los Angeles	67-70	Loss	10-13
July 24	@ Seattle	63-67	Loss	10-14
July 27	Seattle	80-55	Win	11-14
July 31	Indiana	62-54	Win	12-14
September 1	Minnesota	64-72	Loss	12-15
September 3	Phoenix	60-70	Loss	12-16
September 9	@ San Antonio	72-77	Loss	12-17
September 12	@ Washington	63-75	Loss	12-18
September 14	Minnesota	70-59	Win	13-18
September 16	Sacramento	62-71	Loss	13-19
September 18	@ Sacramento	48-68	Loss	13-20
September 19	@ Phoenix	64-78	Loss	13-21

== Player stats ==
Player	Minutes	Field goals	Rebounds	Assists	Steals	Blocks	Points
Tina Thompson	943	180	157	48	22	23	520
Sheryl Swoopes	1070	181	153	91	47	16	459
Michelle Snow	893	104	239	31	28	35	276
Sheila Lambert	788	75	68	88	26	4	197
Dominique Canty	770	63	84	64	32	1	177
Kedra Holland-Corn	703	59	66	53	40	3	177
Tiffani Johnson	660	59	122	27	9	17	142
Felicia Ragland	517	44	67	38	25	3	118
Octavia Blue	155	42	21	5	1	0	44
Lucienne Berthieu	134	12	27	4	6	2	37
Pollyanna Johns Kimbrough	157	3	29	1	4	3	22
LaTonya Johnson	36	2	1	1	2	0	6
Gordana Grubin	24	0	1	0	0	0	2
