= List of all-time NBA win–loss records =

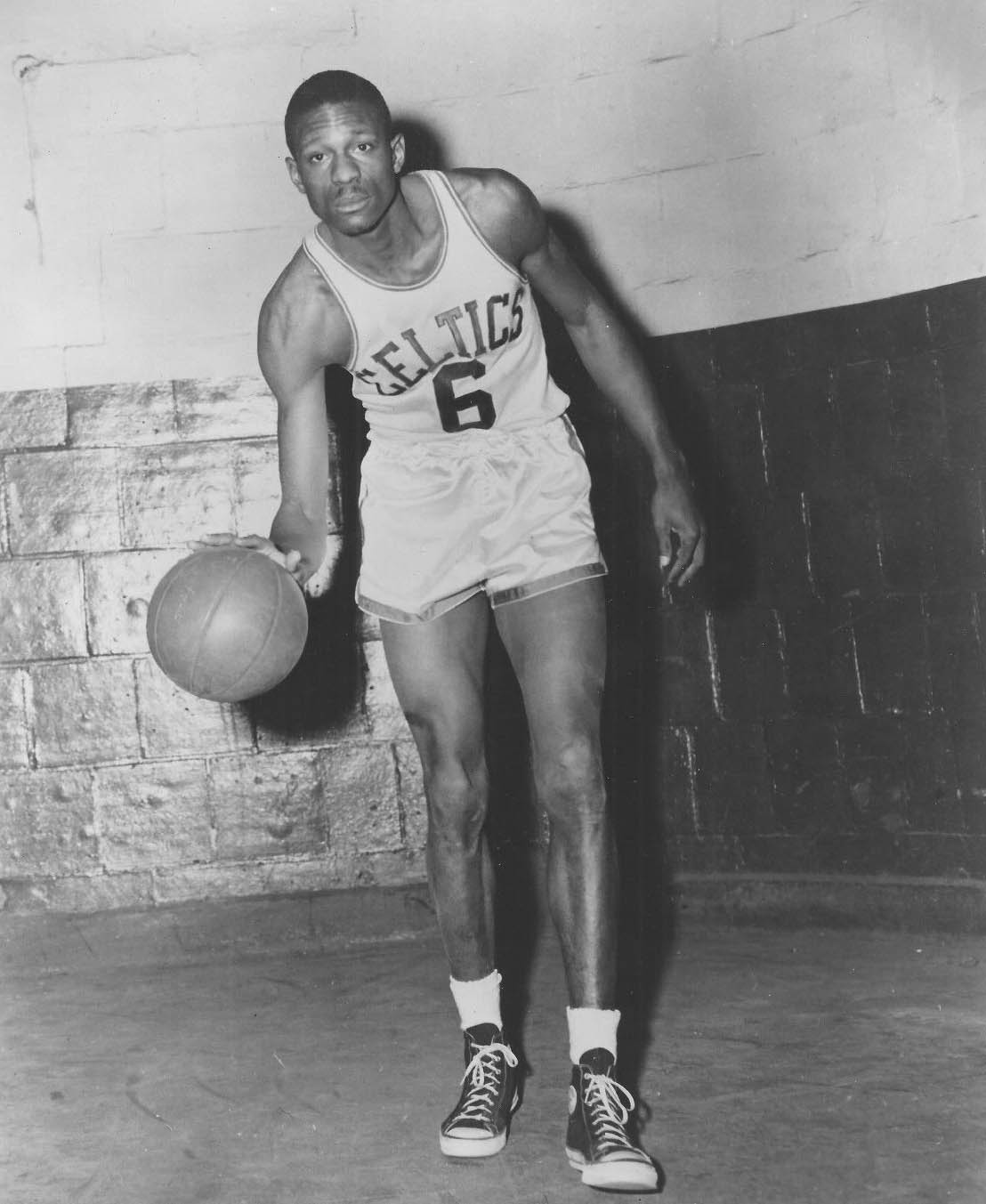
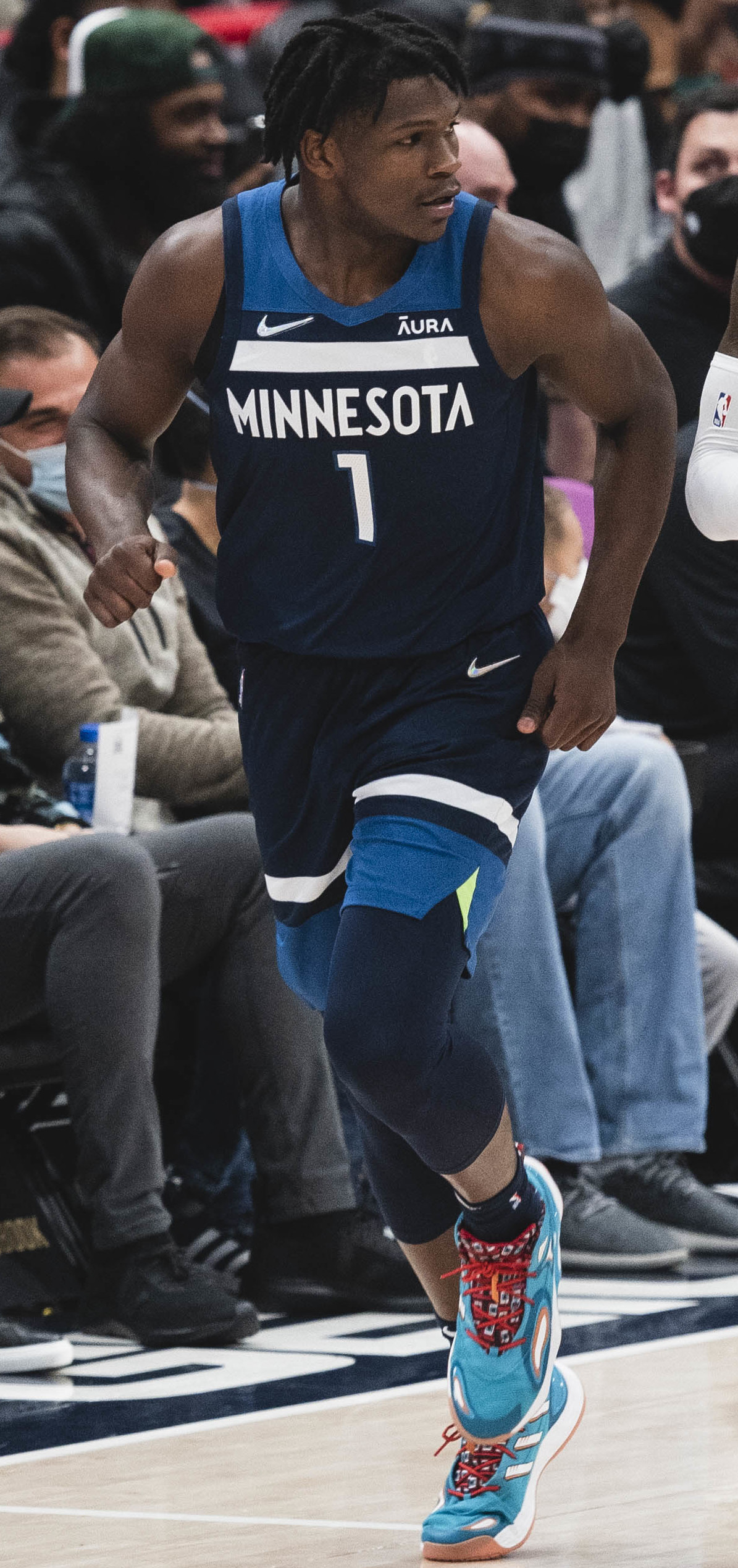
Bill Russell (left), a notable player for the Boston Celtics, the team with the most recorded games played and wins in NBA regular season history, and the highest all-time regular season win–loss percentage; and Anthony Edwards (right), an active player for the Minnesota Timberwolves, the team with the lowest all-time regular season win–loss percentage among active franchises.

The National Basketball Association (NBA) was founded in 1946 and began operations as the Basketball Association of America (BAA). In 1949, the BAA merged with the National Basketball League (NBL), absorbing the latter's teams and rebranding as the NBA; the 1949–50 NBA season marked the first following the merger. NBA win–loss records include the wins and losses recorded during a team's playing time in the BAA. (Note: BAA win–loss records are included, as the NBA claims the BAA's history as its own. For example, at NBA History online its table of one-line "NBA Season Recaps" begins 1946–47 season without comment. NBL statistics are not included, as unlike BAA statistics before the BAA-NBL merger, the NBA has not included NBL statistics when recapping their history.) Defunct BAA/NBA franchises are also accounted for. However, NBA win–loss record do not include the wins and losses recorded during a team's playing time in the American Basketball Association (ABA), despite the 1976 ABA–NBA merger.

In the regular season, the Celtics have the highest win–loss percentage, with 3,751–2,527 (.597). Meanwhile, the Timberwolves have the lowest win–loss record percentage, with 1,245–1,713 (.421). The Celtics also lead NBA teams in games played, with 6,278. Conversely, the New Orleans Pelicans have played the fewest games, with 1,932. The Celtics 3,751 wins are also a regular season record; meanwhile, the Sacramento Kings have recorded the most losses, with 3,359. The Pelicans have also recorded both the fewest wins (878) and losses (1,054) in the regular season history. Since the 2023–24 NBA season, the NBA has hosted its NBA In-Season Tournament (IST), later dubbed the NBA Cup. Games played during the NBA Cup are included in a team's regular season results and thus, count toward a team's win–loss record, except the NBA Cup Finals.

At the end of the regular season, 12 teams (the top 6 teams in both the Eastern Conference and Western Conference standings) will have clinched an NBA playoffs berth. Meanwhile, the 7th-place through 10th-place teams in the two conferences enter an NBA play-in tournament, introduced during the 2020 NBA Bubble, to determine their playoffs seeding. Through the end of the 2026 NBA play-in tournament, the Miami Heat are the most play-in tournament games played, with seven. The Heat also have recorded the most play-in wins, with four total. The Lakers have the best NBA play-in tournament record, having won all three of their games. Conversely, the Cleveland Cavaliers, Los Angeles Clippers and San Antonio Spurs have the worst NBA play-in tournament record, having each lost both of their two games. The records and statistics compiled during play-in games are not included in the regular season nor playoffs figures, though the NBA has included play-in statistics in separate lists on website.

As accurate through the end of the 2026 NBA Finals, the Lakers have the most NBA playoffs games played (800), wins (472), losses (328) and highest playoffs winning percentage with 472–328 (.590). The Hornets have the lowest NBA playoffs winning percentage with 23–40 (.365). The Pelicans have the fewest playoff games played (59), wins (22) and losses (37).

== Active franchises ==
=== Regular season ===
Key
Best win–loss record in division ⁂

Rank	Team	GP	Won	Lost	Pct.	First NBA season	Division	Ref.	Notes
1	Boston Celtics	6,278	3,751	2,527	.597	1946–47	Atlantic ⁂		
2	San Antonio Spurs	4,031	2,401	1,630	.596	1976–77	Southwest ⁂		(Note: The Spurs began play as the Dallas Chaparrals in the 1967–68 season, as one of the ABA's charter members. Renamed as the "Texas Chaparrals" during the 1970–71 season, the team reverted back to the Dallas Chaparrals name for the following season. They then relocated to San Antonio and rebranded as the Spurs ahead of the 1973–74 season. The Spurs were then absorbed into the NBA following the 1976 ABA–NBA merger. The franchise recorded a 378–366 (.508) win–loss record over 744 games played in the ABA. This record is not included in their NBA statistics. If it was, they would have a 2,779–1,996 (.582) record over 4,775 total games played.)
3	Los Angeles Lakers	6,168	3,653	2,515	.592	1948–49	Pacific ⁂		(Note: The team began as Detroit Gems in 1946–47 NBL season. The Lakers played as the Minneapolis Lakers from 1947 in NBL and from 1948–1960 in NBA. The team then relocated to Los Angeles and have played as the Los Angeles Lakers since the 1960–61 season. The franchise's 43–17 (.717) NBL record over 60 games played are not included in their NBA statistics. If it was, they would have a 3,696–2,532 (.593) record over 6,228 total games played.)
4	Oklahoma City Thunder	4,770	2,602	2,168	.545	1967–68	Northwest ⁂		(Note: The Oklahoma City Thunder were founded as the Seattle SuperSonics, which they played as from 1967–2008, before relocating to Oklahoma City and rebranding as the Oklahoma City Thunder. They have played as the Thunder since the 2008–09 season.)
5	Phoenix Suns	4,689	2,510	2,179	.535	1968–69	Pacific		
6	Utah Jazz	4,196	2,216	1,980	.528	1974–75	Northwest		(Note: The Jazz played as the New Orleans Jazz from 1974–1979, before relocating to Utah and rebranding as the Utah Jazz, which they have played as since the 1979–80 season.)
7	Milwaukee Bucks	4,689	2,469	2,220	.527	1968–69	Central ⁂		
8	Miami Heat	3,049	1,601	1,448	.525	1988–89	Southeast ⁂		
9	Portland Trail Blazers	4,526	2,370	2,156	.524	1970–71	Northwest		
10	Philadelphia 76ers	6,105	3,170	2,935	.519	1949–50	Atlantic		(Note: The Philadelphia 76ers played as the Syracuse Nationals from 1946 to 1963. However, they began play as an NBL team; their first NBA season was the 1949–50 season. The franchise then relocated to Philadelphia and rebranded as the Philadelphia 76ers, which they have played as since the 1963–64 season. The franchise's 85–82 (.509) win–loss record over their 167 NBL games played are not included in their NBA statistics. If it was, they would have a 3,255–3,017 (.519) record over 6,272 total games played.)
11	Houston Rockets	4,770	2,473	2,297	.518	1967–68	Southwest		(Note: The Rockets played as the San Diego Rockets from 1967–1971, before relocating to Houston. They have played as the Houston Rockets since the 1971–72 season.)
12	Denver Nuggets	4,033	2,058	1,975	.510	1976–77	Northwest		(Note: The Nuggets began play as the Denver Rockets in the 1967–68 season, as one of the ABA's charter members. The team then rebranded as the Denver Nuggets after the 1973–74 season and were later absorbed into the NBA following the 1976 ABA–NBA merger. The franchise recorded a 413–331 (.555) win–loss record in the ABA over 744 games played, which is not included in its NBA statistics. If it was, they would have a 2,471–2,306 (.517) record over 4,777 total games played.)
13	Chicago Bulls	4,844	2,453	2,391	.506	1966–67	Central		
14	Dallas Mavericks	3,707	1,862	1,845	.502	1980–81	Southwest		
15	Indiana Pacers	4,032	1,999	2,033	.496	1976–77	Central		(Note: The Indiana Pacers began play in the 1967–68 season, as one of the ABA's charter members. They were absorbed into the NBA following the 1976 ABA–NBA merger. The Pacers logged a 427–317 (.574) win–loss record over their 744 games played in the ABA, though these stats are not included in their NBA statistics. If it was, they would have a 2,426–2,350 (.508) record over 4,776 total games played.)
16	Atlanta Hawks	6,102	3,013	3,088	.494	1949–50	Southeast		(Note: Before joining the NBA, the franchise began play in the NBL as the Buffalo Bisons in 1945–46 NBL season. They then relocated from Buffalo, New York to Moline, Illinois and rebranded as the Tri-Cities Blackhawks. They played under that name from 1946–1951. In the midst of these years, they were absorbed into the NBA as part of the BAA–NBL merger, with their 1949–50 season marking their first of NBA play. They then relocated to Milwaukee and rebranding as Milwaukee Hawks, which they played as from 1951–1955. They then relocated to St. Louis, playing as the St. Louis Hawks from 1955–1968. The team then relocated to Atlanta and have played as the Atlanta Hawks since the 1968–69 season. The Hawks recorded an 85–83 (.506) win–loss record in the NBL record over 168 games played, which is not included in their NBA statistics. If it was, they would have a 3,098–3,171 (.494) record over 6,270 total games played.)
17	New York Knicks	6,269	3,078	3,191	.491	1946–47	Atlantic		
18	Golden State Warriors	6,268	3,054	3,213	.487	1946–47	Pacific		(Note: The Golden State Warriors played in Philadelphia Warriors from 1946–1962, then relocating to San Francisco from 1962–1971. They rebranded as the Golden State Warriors to begin the 1971–72 season.)
19	Detroit Pistons	6,162	2,931	3,231	.476	1948–49	Central		(Note: The team predates the NBA. Originally a semi-professional team located in Fort Wayne, Indiana, they played as the Fort Wayne Zollner Pistons from 1937–1948. Their first season as a professional team came was their 1941–42 season, which they played as a member of the NBL. They joined the BAA in its final season prior to the BAA–NBL merger and upon joining the BAA, adjusted their team name to the Fort Wayne Pistons, which they played as from 1948–1957. The team then relocated to Detroit, with their 1957–58 season being their name as the Detroit Pistons. The Pistons recorded a 166–71 (.700) win–loss record in the NBL over 237 games played, which is not included in their NBA statistics. If it was, they would have a 3,097–3,302 (.484) record over 6,399 total games played.)
20	Cleveland Cavaliers	4,517	2,148	2,369	.476	1970–71	Central		
21	Toronto Raptors	2,474	1,172	1,302	.474	1995–96	Atlantic		
22	Orlando Magic	2,967	1,401	1,566	.472	1989–90	Southeast		
23	Sacramento Kings	6,169	2,810	3,359	.456	1948–49	Pacific		(Note: Predating the NBA, the Kings began play in Rochester, New York as the Rochester Seagrams in 1923, playing under the name until 1942. They then had multiple name changes in the following years, playing as the Rochester Eber Seagrams from 1942 to 1943 and the Rochester Pros from 1943 to 1945. Upon joining the NBL in 1945, they then rebranded as the Rochester Royals. The team was absorbed into the NBA following the BAA–NBL merger in 1948, later relocating to Cincinnati in 1957. They kept the Royals name and played there until 1972. They played as the Kansas City–Omaha Kings from 1972 to 1975 and as the Kansas City Kings from 1975 to 1985. Since 1985, they have played under their current Sacramento Kings branding. The Kings recorded a 99–39 (.717) win–loss record in the NBL over 138 games played, which is not included in their NBA statistics. If it was, they would have a 2,909–3,398 (.461) record over 6,307 total games played.)
24	New Orleans Pelicans	1,932	878	1,054	.454	2002–03	Southwest		(Note: The Pelicans began play as the New Orleans Hornets in the 2002–03 season, due to the original Charlotte Hornets, which began play in the 1988–89 NBA season, having relocated to New Orleans. The city of Charlotte, North Carolina was then awarded the 30th NBA franchise, dubbed the Charlotte Bobcats, which began play in the 2004–05 season. The New Orleans Hornets rebranded as the New Orleans Pelicans, with the 2013–14 season being their first under the Pelicans moniker. As a result, the Charlotte Bobcats then rebranded as the Charlotte Hornets, first playing under the name in the 2014–15 season. This second incarnation of the Hornets retained the statistics and records of the original Hornets franchise which played from the 1988 to 2002, as well as the statistics and records accumulated while playing as the Charlotte Bobcats. Meanwhile, the Pelicans franchise was retroactively regarded as an expansion franchise beginning play in the 2002–03 NBA season, maintaining the statistics and records accumulated from that season onwards, including during their temporary tenure as the New Orleans/Oklahoma City Hornets from 2005 to 2007.)
25	Washington Wizards	5,251	2,307	2,944	.439	1961–62	Southeast		(Note: The Washington Wizards were established as the Chicago Packers for their inaugural 1961–62 season, before rebranding as the Chicago Zephyrs. They played as the Chicago Zephyrs for a single season (1962–63), before relocating to Baltimore and adopting Baltimore Bullets as their team name. They played as the Baltimore Bullets from 1963 to 1973. Afterwards, they relocated to Washington, D.C. and played as the Capital Bullets for the 1973–74 season. They then rebranded to the Washington Bullets, playing under the name from 1974 to 1997. Beginning with their 1997–98 season, they have played under the current Washington Wizards team name.)
26	Memphis Grizzlies	2,475	1,071	1,404	.433	1995–96	Southwest		(Note: The Memphis Grizzlies were established as the Vancouver Grizzlies, playing in Vancouver from 1995–2001. They relocated to Memphis, Tennessee, and have played as the Memphis Grizzlies since the 2001–02 season.)
27	Charlotte Hornets	2,877	1,237	1,640	.430	1988–89	Southeast		
28	Los Angeles Clippers	4,524	1,935	2,589	.428	1970–71	Pacific		(Note: The Clippers played as the Buffalo Braves from 1970 to 1978. The team relocated to San Diego and rebranded as the San Diego Clippers, which they played as from 1978 to 1984. They then relocated to Los Angeles, with their 1984–85 season marking their first as the Los Angeles Clippers.)
29	Brooklyn Nets	4,032	1,700	2,332	.422	1976–77	Atlantic		(Note: Originally an ABA team, the Brooklyn Nets began play as the New Jersey Americans in the 1967–68 season, then relocated to New York and rebranded as the New York Nets in 1968–69 season, they were known for their two times champion, including 1973–74 season, 1975–76 season and were absorbed into the NBA following the 1976 ABA–NBA merger, then they played their first NBA season as the New York Nets from 1976–77 season, then relocating to New Jersey in 1977–78 season and rebranded as the New Jersey Nets. They moved to Brooklyn, then rebranded as the Brooklyn Nets in 2012–13 season. The franchise recorded a 374–370 (.503) win–loss record in the ABA record over 744 games, which is not included in its NBA statistics. If it was, the Nets would have a 2,074–2,702 (.434) record over 4,776 total games played.)
30	Minnesota Timberwolves	2,958	1,245	1,713	.421	1989–90	Northwest		
This list is accurate through the end of the 2025–26 NBA season.

=== Play-in tournament ===
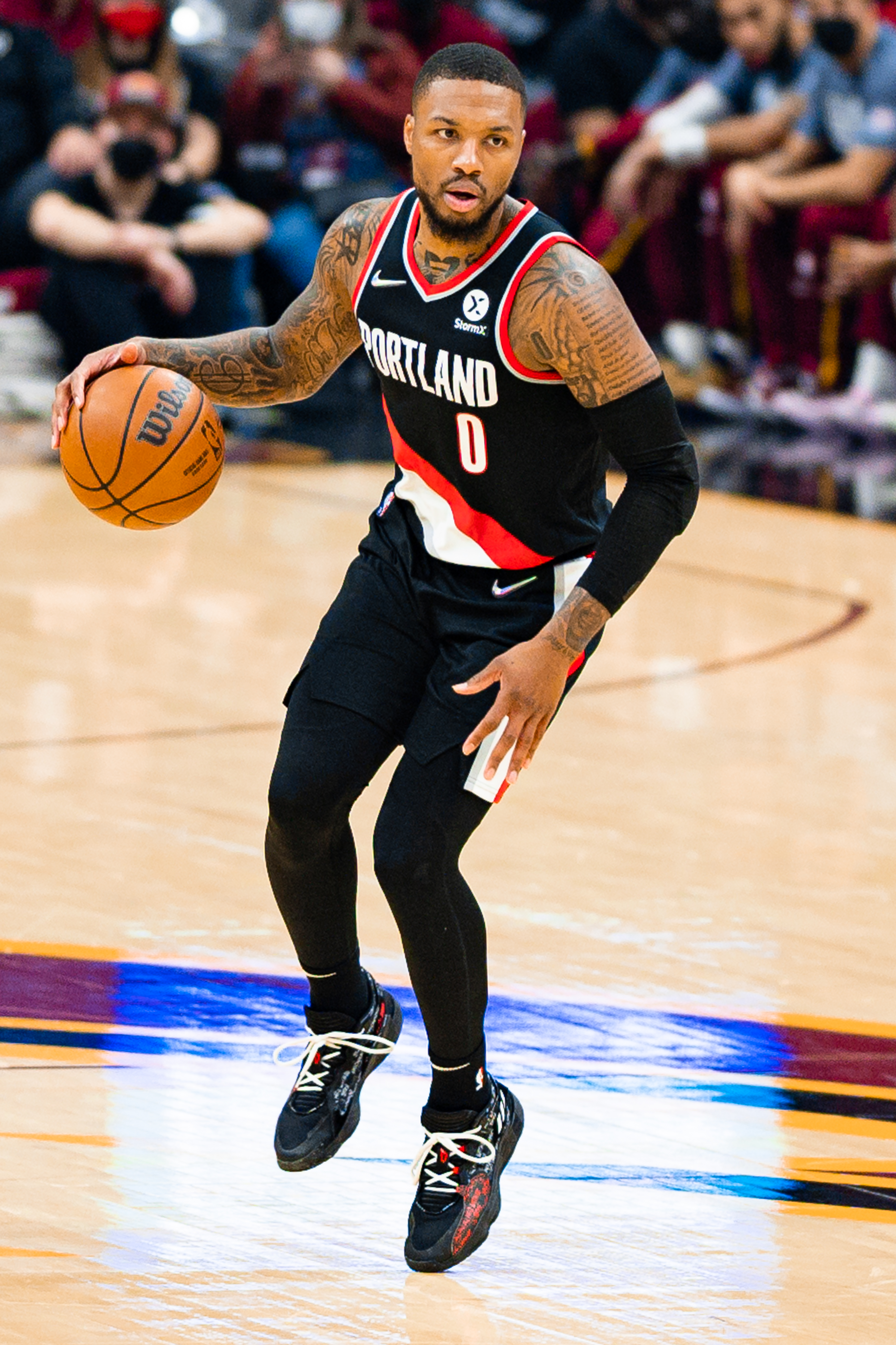
Damian Lillard led the Portland Trail Blazers to the first play-in tournament victory in NBA history.

During the 2020 NBA Bubble, the NBA introduced a play-in tournament in the 2019–20 NBA season to compensate for the suspension of the regular season and a difference in the number of games played between teams, as a result of the COVID-19 pandemic. For the 2019–20 NBA season, if a conference's 9th-place team was within 4 games back of the 8th-place team in the standings, a play-in matchup between the two seeds would be triggered. To clinch the 8th seed in the playoffs, the 8th-place team would need to win one game, while the 9th-place team would need to win two in the matchup. Ultimately, the Western Conference's Blazers and Grizzlies would face off in a play-in game.

The future of the NBA play-in tournament was then explored, with many reports concurring that it would indeed become a permanent fixture in the NBA. Due to the success of the NBA play-in tournament and the COVID-19 pandemic persisting into the 2020–21 NBA season, the league installed an NBA play-in tournament involving both conference's 7th-place through 10th-place teams in the standings upon the end of the regular season, without regard to games back. The format of the NBA play-in tournament, still in place as of the 2026 season, involves the 7th-place team plays a home game against the 8th-place team, with the winner clinching the 7th seed in their respective conference's playoff bracket. Meanwhile, the 9th-place team plays a home game against the 10th-place team, with the loser being eliminated from playoffs contention. Then, the winner of the 9th-10th place team plays on the road, visiting the loser of the 7th-8th place matchup. The winner of this game clinches the 8th seed, with the loser being eliminated.

24 teams of the NBA's 30 teams have played at least one play-in game; the 6 teams yet to participate are the Utah Jazz, Milwaukee Bucks, Houston Rockets, Denver Nuggets, New York Knicks and Detroit Pistons.

Key
Best win–loss record in division ⁂

Team	GP	Won	Lost	Pct.	Division
Los Angeles Lakers	3	3	0	1.000	Pacific ⁂
Portland Trail Blazers	2	2	0	1.000	Northwest ⁂
Philadelphia 76ers	2	2	0	1.000	Atlantic ⁂
Boston Celtics	1	1	0	1.000	Atlantic ⁂
Brooklyn Nets	1	1	0	1.000	Atlantic ⁂
New Orleans Pelicans	4	3	1	.750	Southwest ⁂
Orlando Magic	3	2	1	.667	Southeast ⁂
Minnesota Timberwolves	3	2	1	.667	Northwest
Memphis Grizzlies	5	3	2	.600	Southwest
Miami Heat	7	4	3	.571	Southeast
Atlanta Hawks	6	3	3	.500	Southeast
Indiana Pacers	2	1	1	.500	Central ⁂
Phoenix Suns	2	1	1	.500	Pacific
Oklahoma City Thunder	2	1	1	.500	Northwest
Washington Wizards	2	1	1	.500	Southeast
Dallas Mavericks	2	1	1	.500	Southwest
Chicago Bulls	5	2	3	.400	Central
Golden State Warriors	6	2	4	.333	Pacific
Sacramento Kings	3	1	2	.333	Pacific
Charlotte Hornets	4	1	3	.250	Southeast
Toronto Raptors	1	0	1	.000	Atlantic
Cleveland Cavaliers	2	0	2	.000	Central
Los Angeles Clippers	2	0	2	.000	Pacific
San Antonio Spurs	2	0	2	.000	Southwest
This list is accurate through the end of the 2026 NBA play-in tournament.

=== Playoffs ===
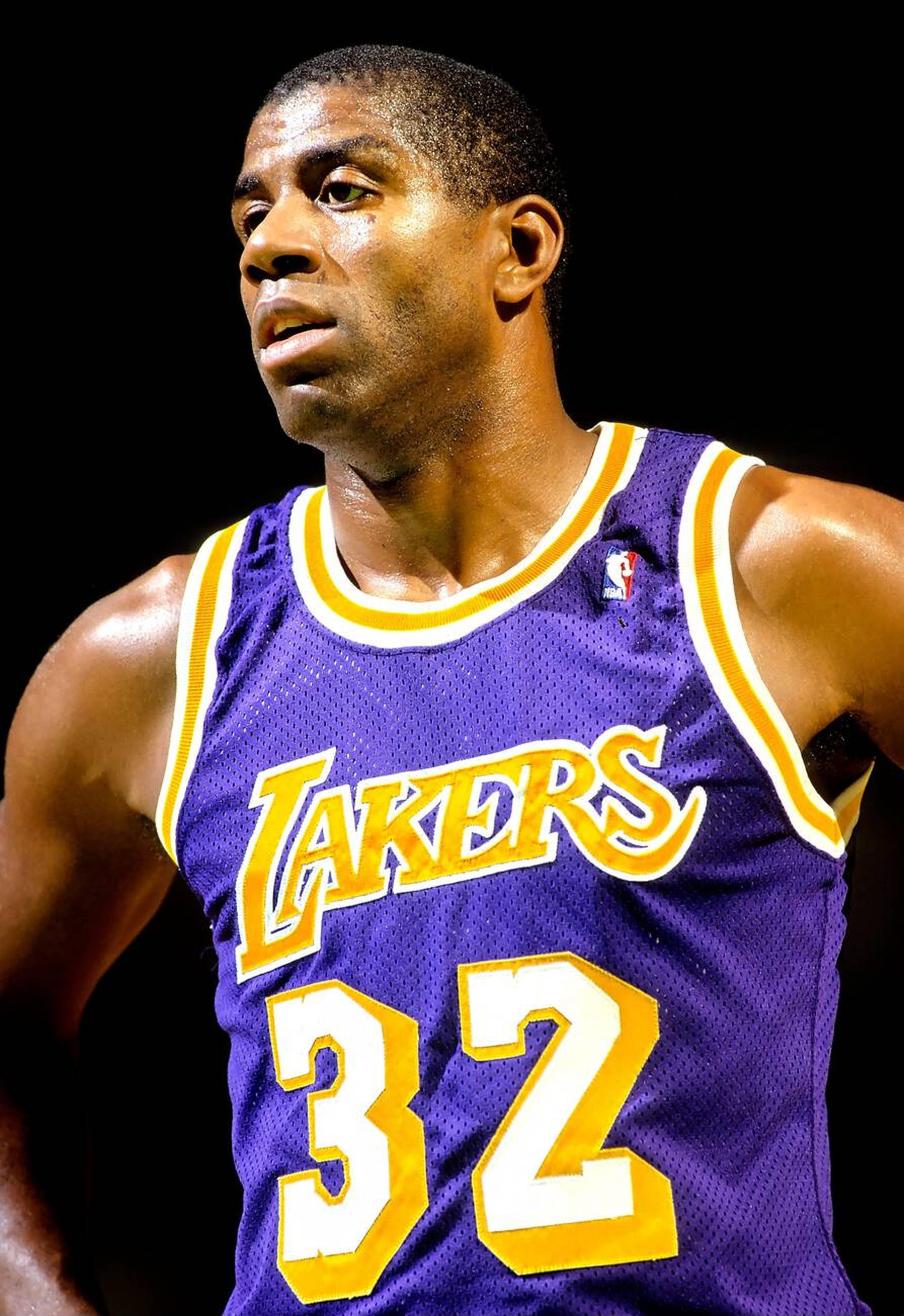
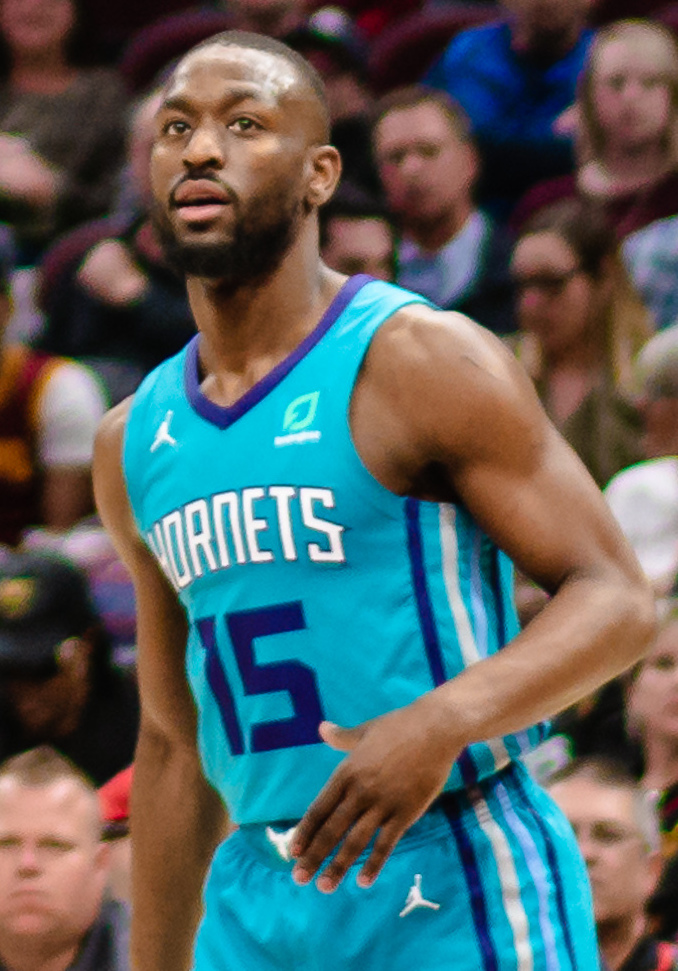
Magic Johnson (left) of the Los Angeles Lakers, who have recorded the highest playoff win–loss percentage, and the most postseason wins in NBA history; and Kemba Walker (right) during his time with the Charlotte Hornets, who have recorded the lowest playoff win–loss percentage in NBA history.

Key
Best win–loss record in division ⁂
Champion ★
Qualified for most recent playoffs ✔
Team in playoff drought †

Rank	Team	App.	GP	Won	Lost	Pct.	Last playoff appearance	Titles	Division	Ref.	Notes
1	Los Angeles Lakers	66	800	472	328	.590	2026 ✘	17	Pacific ⁂		(Note: The Lakers recorded an 8–2 (.800) win–loss record in the NBL playoffs over 10 games played, which is not included in their NBA statistics. If it was, they would have a 478–328 (.593) record over 806 total games played.)
2	Boston Celtics	63	756	432	324	.571	2026 ✘	18	Atlantic ⁂		
3	San Antonio Spurs	40	426	235	191	.552	2026 ✘	5	Southwest ⁂		(Note: The Spurs recorded a 17–32 (.347) win–loss record in the ABA playoffs over 49 games played, which is not included in their NBA statistics. If it was, they would have a 245–215 (.533) record over 460 total games played.)
4	Golden State Warriors	38	396	217	179	.548	2025 †	7	Pacific		
5	Miami Heat	26	299	163	136	.545	2025 †	3	Southeast ⁂		
6	Chicago Bulls	36	349	187	162	.536	2022 †	6	Central ⁂		
7	Cleveland Cavaliers	26	273	144	129	.527	2026 ✘	1	Central		
8	Oklahoma City Thunder	35	379	197	182	.520	2026 ✘	2	Northwest ⁂		
9	New York Knicks	47	441	226	215	.509	2026 ★	3	Atlantic		
10	Philadelphia 76ers	55	499	254	245	.509	2026 ✘	3	Atlantic		(Note: The 76ers 4–9 (.308) win–loss record in the NBL playoffs over 13 games played, which is not included in their NBA statistics. If it was, they would have a 258–251 (.507) record over 509 total games played.)
11	Detroit Pistons	44	390	197	193	.505	2026 ✘	3	Central		(Note: The Pistons recorded a 22–18 (.550) win–loss record in the NBL playoffs over 40 games played, which is not included in their NBA statistics. If it was, they would have a 218–208 (.512) record over 426 total games played.) (Note: RealGM lists all the Pistons' playoff wins and losses, organized by round, but omit their 1954 NBA playoffs results. Due to the NBA having only 9 teams that season, the league used a round-robin schedule, as opposed to a traditional opening round during the playoffs. These round-robin results are omitted from RealGM's listing of playoff results by round, which are organized under opening round, conference semifinals, conference finals, and NBA Finals. The Pistons went 0–4 in the 1954 round-robin; this record is considered official by the NBA and thus included in this list.)
12	Indiana Pacers	29	281	138	143	.491	2025 †	0	Central		(Note: The Pacers recorded a 69–50 (.580) win—loss record in the ABA playoffs over 119 games played, which is not included in their NBA statistics. If it was, they would have a 207–193 (.518) record over 400 total games played.)
13	Phoenix Suns	34	328	160	168	.488	2026 ✘	0	Pacific		
14	Houston Rockets	36	335	163	172	.487	2026 ✘	2	Southwest		
15	Milwaukee Bucks	37	317	153	164	.483	2025 †	2	Central		
16	Dallas Mavericks	25	249	118	131	.474	2024 †	1	Southwest		
17	Utah Jazz	31	292	135	157	.462	2022 †	0	Northwest		
18	Toronto Raptors	14	130	60	70	.462	2026 ✘	1	Atlantic		
19	Denver Nuggets	32	262	114	148	.435	2026 ✘	1	Northwest		(Note: The Nuggets recorded a 27–35 (.435) win–loss record in the ABA playoffs over 62 games played, which is not included in their NBA statistics. If it was, they would have a 141–183 (.435) record over 324 total games played.)
20	Orlando Magic	19	152	66	86	.434	2026 ✘	0	Southeast		
21	Los Angeles Clippers	19	160	69	91	.431	2025 †	0	Pacific		
22	Portland Trail Blazers	37	279	120	159	.430	2026 ✘	1	Northwest		
23	Atlanta Hawks	50	396	170	226	.429	2026 ✘	1	Southeast		(Note: The Hawks recorded a 6–6 (.500) win–loss record in the NBL playoffs over 12 games played, which is not included in their NBA statistics. If it was, they would have a 174–228 (.433) record over 402 total games played.)
24	Sacramento Kings	29	194	83	111	.428	2023 †	1	Pacific		(Note: The Kings recorded an 18–11 (.621) win–loss record in the NBL playoffs over 29 games played, which is not included in their NBA statistics. If it was, they would have a 101–122 (.453) record over 223 total games played.) (Note: RealGM lists all the Kings' playoff wins and losses, organized by round, but omit some of their 1954 NBA playoffs results. Due to the NBA having only nine teams that season, the league used a round-robin schedule, as opposed to a traditional opening round during the playoffs. These round-robin results are omitted from RealGM's listing of playoff results by round, which are organized under opening round, conference semifinals, conference finals, and NBA Finals. The Kings, then known as the Rochester Royals, went 2–1 in the 1954 round-robin; this record is considered official by the NBA and thus included in this list.)
25	Minnesota Timberwolves	14	106	45	61	.425	2026 ✘	0	Northwest		
26	Washington Wizards	30	237	99	138	.418	2021 †	1	Southeast		
27	Brooklyn Nets	24	171	70	101	.409	2023 †	0	Atlantic		(Note: The Nets recorded a 37–32 (.536) win–loss record in the ABA playoffs over 69 games played, which is not included in their NBA statistics. If it was, they would have a 107–133 (.446) record over 240 total games played.)
28	New Orleans Pelicans	9	59	22	37	.373	2024 †	0	Southwest		
29	Memphis Grizzlies	14	102	38	64	.373	2025 †	0	Southwest		
30	Charlotte Hornets	10	63	23	40	.365	2016 †	0	Southeast		
This list is accurate through the end of the 2026 NBA Finals.

== Defunct franchises ==
17 BAA/NBA franchises are now defunct, although only 15 played games. Amongst defunct franchises, the Chicago Stags have the highest win–loss record percentage, with (.612). The Denver Nuggets have the lowest win–loss record percentage, with (.177). The Baltimore Bullets have the most games played (450), wins (158) and losses (292) for a defunct NBA franchise. The Cleveland Rebels, Toronto Huskies, Detroit Falcons, Indianapolis Jets and Pittsburgh Ironmen are all tied for fewest games played (60).

Only teams that recorded playing time in the BAA/NBA are included, as the NBA does not recap NBL statistics nor does it officially count ABA statistics.

=== Regular season ===
Rank	Team	GP	Won	Lost	Pct.	First BAA/ NBA season	Last BAA/ NBA season	Division
1	Chicago Stags	237	145	92	.612	1946–47	1949–50	Central⁂
2	Washington Capitols	271	157	114	.579	1946–47	1950–51	Eastern⁂
3	Anderson Packers	64	37	27	.578	1949–50		Eastern
4	St. Louis Bombers	237	122	115	.515	1946–47	1949–50	Western⁂
5	Cleveland Rebels (Note: This team folded prior to the BAA–NBL merger and therefore its history occurred entirely prior to the BAA becoming the NBA.)	60	30	30	.500	1946–47		Western
6	Indianapolis Olympians	269	132	137	.491	1949–50	1952–53	Western
7	Toronto Huskies	60	22	38	.367	1946–47		Eastern
8	Sheboygan Red Skins	62	22	40	.355	1949–50		Western
9	Baltimore Bullets (Note: This team's history and records are not affiliated with the current day Washington Wizards who played as the Baltimore Bullets from 1963–64 NBA season to 1972–73 NBA season.)	450	158	292	.351	1947–48	1954–55	Eastern
10	Detroit Falcons	60	20	40	.333	1946–47		Western
11	Waterloo Hawks	62	19	43	.306	1949–50		Western
12	Indianapolis Jets	60	18	42	.300	1948–49		Western
13	Providence Steamrollers	168	46	122	.274	1946–47	1948–49	Eastern
14	Pittsburgh Ironmen	60	15	45	.250	1946–47		Western
15	Denver Nuggets (Note: This team's history and records are not affiliated with the current day Denver Nuggets team.)	62	11	51	.177	1949–50		Western

=== Playoffs ===
Team	GP	Won	Lost	Pct.	Titles	Division
Baltimore Bullets (Note: This team's history and records are not affiliated with the current day Washington Wizards who played as the Baltimore Bullets from 1963–64 NBA season to 1972–73 NBA season.)	16	9	7	.563	1	Eastern⁂
Anderson Packers	8	4	4	.500	0	Eastern
Washington Capitols	19	8	11	.421	0	Eastern
Chicago Stags	20	7	13	.350	0	Central⁂
St. Louis Bombers	12	4	8	.333	0	Western⁂
Cleveland Rebels	3	1	2	.333	0	Western⁂
Sheboygan Red Skins	3	1	2	.333	0	Western⁂
Indianapolis Olympians	13	4	9	.308	0	Western
Detroit Falcons	0	0	0	–	0	Western
Waterloo Hawks	0	0	0	–	0	Western
Indianapolis Jets	0	0	0	–	0	Western
Toronto Huskies	0	0	0	–	0	Eastern
Providence Steamrollers	0	0	0	–	0	Eastern
Pittsburgh Ironmen	0	0	0	–	0	Western
Denver Nuggets (Note: This team's history and records are not affiliated with the current day Denver Nuggets team.)	0	0	0	–	0	Western

== See also ==
- List of all-time WNBA win–loss records
- List of NBA champions
- List of NBA playoff series
- List of NBA teams by single season win percentage
