= 2003 Washington Mystics season =

- Head coach: Marianne Stanley
- Arena: MCI Center

Results
- Record: 9–25 (.265)
- Place: 7th (Eastern)
- Playoff finish: Did not qualify

The 2003 WNBA season was the sixth for the Washington Mystics.

== Offseason ==
=== Dispersal Draft ===
Pick	Player	Nationality	Former team
8	Jenny Mowe (C)	United States	Portland Fire

=== WNBA draft ===
Round	Pick	Player	Nationality	College/School/Team
1	7	Aiysha Smith (C)	United States	LSU
2	21	Zuzana Zirkova (G)	Slovakia	Slovakia
3	32	Trish Juhline (G)	United States	Villanova
3	36	Tamara Bowie (F)	United States	Ball State

== Regular season ==
=== Season standings ===
Eastern Conference	W	L	PCT	GB	Home	Road	Conf.
Detroit Shock ^{x}	25	9	.735	–	13–4	12–5	18–6
Charlotte Sting ^{x}	18	16	.529	7.0	13–4	5–12	12–12
Connecticut Sun ^{x}	18	16	.529	7.0	10–7	8–9	11–13
Cleveland Rockers ^{x}	17	17	.500	8.0	11–6	6–11	13–11
Indiana Fever ^{o}	16	18	.471	9.0	11–6	5–12	12–12
New York Liberty ^{o}	16	18	.471	9.0	11–6	5–12	11–13
Washington Mystics ^{o}	9	25	.265	16.0	3–14	6–11	7–17

=== Season schedule ===
Date	Opponent	Score	Result	Record
May 23	@ Charlotte	74-70	Win	1-0
May 31	@ Indiana	60-71	Loss	1-1
June 1	@ New York	57-70	Loss	1-2
June 6	Cleveland	53-63	Loss	1-3
June 10	San Antonio	79-72	Win	2-3
June 13	@ Connecticut	70-84	Loss	2-4
June 14	Detroit	56-93	Loss	2-5
June 18	Sacramento	61-69	Loss	2-6
June 20	@ Cleveland	74-79	Loss	2-7
June 24	Connecticut	63-65	Loss	2-8
June 29	Minnesota	50-59	Loss	2-9
July 2	@ Sacramento	62-83	Loss	2-10
July 3	@ Seattle	72-76	Loss	2-11
July 5	@ Houston	54-76	Loss	2-12
July 7	Charlotte	56-62	Loss	2-13
July 9	Los Angeles	91-97	Loss	2-14
July 15	@ New York	77-64	Win	3-14
July 17	Charlotte	68-60	Win	4-14
July 19	@ San Antonio	85-77	Win	5-14
July 22	@ Los Angeles	73-77	Loss	5-15
July 24	Indiana	75-80	Loss	5-16
July 26	@ Cleveland	78-89	Loss	5-17
July 27	@ Detroit	71-81	Loss	5-18
July 29	Indiana	91-92 (OT)	Loss	5-19
August 1	@ Connecticut	48-45	Win	6-19
August 3	Phoenix	69-70 (OT)	Loss	6-20
August 6	Detroit	92-81	Win	7-20
August 9	New York	56-65	Loss	7-21
August 12	@ Indiana	84-80	Win	8-21
August 14	@ Charlotte	76-69	Win	9-21
August 16	Cleveland	68-72	Loss	9-22
August 21	New York	60-65	Loss	9-23
August 23	Connecticut	67-74	Loss	9-24
August 25	@ Detroit	60-68	Loss	9-25

== Player stats ==
Player	GP	REB	AST	STL	BLK	PTS
Chamique Holdsclaw	27	294	89	34	15	554
Coco Miller	33	127	86	39	7	413
Stacey Dales	34	101	114	29	12	340
Asjha Jones	34	135	52	16	25	290
Murriel Page	34	152	35	18	24	213
Annie Burgess	34	79	112	27	1	131
Aiysha Smith	31	65	10	11	9	104
Jocelyn Penn	30	52	16	15	1	86
Kiesha Brown	27	32	28	13	1	60
Helen Luz	20	10	21	6	2	59
Nakia Sanford	17	26	1	3	2	49
Tonya Washington	13	10	3	1	0	20
Zuzana Zirkova	6	2	1	0	0	11
Sonja Henning	1	0	0	1	0	0
