= 2003 Phoenix Mercury season =

- Head coach: John Shumate
- Arena: America West Arena

Results
- Record: 8–26 (.235)
- Place: 7th (Western)
- Playoff finish: Did not qualify

The 2003 WNBA season was the seventh season for the Phoenix Mercury franchise. The season saw Phoenix going for the worst record in the league at a franchise worst of 8-26.

== Offseason ==
=== Dispersal Draft ===
Pick	Player	Nationality	Former team
4	Tamicha Jackson (G)	United States	Portland Fire

=== WNBA draft ===
Round	Pick	Player	Nationality	College/School/Team
1	4	Plenette Pierson (F)	United States	Texas Tech
2	16	Petra Ujhelyi (F/C)	United States	South Carolina
3	31	Telisha Quarles (G)	United States	Virginia
3	33	Marion Jones (G)	United States	North Carolina

== Regular season ==
=== Season standings ===
Western Conference	W	L	PCT	GB	Home	Road	Conf.
Los Angeles Sparks ^{x}	24	10	.706	–	11–6	13–4	17–7
Houston Comets ^{x}	20	14	.588	4.0	14–3	6–11	14–10
Sacramento Monarchs ^{x}	19	15	.559	5.0	12–5	7–10	13–11
Minnesota Lynx ^{x}	18	16	.529	6.0	11–6	7–10	14–10
Seattle Storm ^{o}	18	16	.529	6.0	13–4	5–12	11–13
San Antonio Silver Stars ^{o}	12	22	.353	12.0	9–8	3–14	10–14
Phoenix Mercury ^{o}	8	26	.235	16.0	6–11	2–15	5–19

=== Season schedule ===
Date	Opponent	Score	Result	Record
May 22	Sacramento	56-65	Loss	0-1
May 24	Houston	62-69	Loss	0-2
May 28	San Antonio	51-50	Win	1-2
May 30	@ Sacramento	49-69	Loss	1-3
June 3	@ Houston	51-66	Loss	1-4
June 5	@ San Antonio	55-70	Loss	1-5
June 7	@ Seattle	57-66	Loss	1-6
June 12	Charlotte	50-58	Loss	1-7
June 14	Houston	76-61	Win	2-7
June 17	Seattle	60-61	Loss	2-8
June 21	Los Angeles	48-54	Loss	2-9
June 25	@ New York	64-70	Loss	2-10
June 27	@ Minnesota	59-67	Loss	2-11
June 28	@ Detroit	68-65	Win	3-11
July 2	@ Indiana	68-79	Loss	3-12
July 5	@ San Antonio	70-81	Loss	3-13
July 10	Cleveland	67-68	Loss	3-14
July 15	@ Los Angeles	77-80	Loss	3-15
July 19	Connecticut	67-75	Loss	3-16
July 24	@ Los Angeles	65-82	Loss	3-17
July 25	@ Seattle	53-82	Loss	3-18
July 29	New York	66-59	Win	4-18
August 1	@ Cleveland	56-73	Loss	4-19
August 3	@ Washington	70-69	Win	5-19
August 4	@ Minnesota	56-61	Loss	5-20
August 6	Minnesota	56-49	Win	6-20
August 8	Los Angeles	64-67	Loss	6-21
August 10	@ Houston	46-69	Loss	6-22
August 13	Detroit	76-78	Loss	6-23
August 15	Seattle	64-50	Win	7-23
August 16	Sacramento	61-65	Loss	7-24
August 20	Minnesota	66-69	Loss	7-25
August 22	San Antonio	89-62	Win	8-25
August 23	@ Sacramento	54-61	Loss	8-26

== Player stats ==
Note: GP = Games played; REB = Rebounds; AST = Assists; STL = Steals; BLK = Blocks; PTS = Points; AVG = Average

Player	GP	REB	AST	STL	BLK	PTS	AVG
Anna DeForge	34	105	72	51	12	405	11.9
Adrian Williams-Strong	34	252	31	57	19	334	9.8
Tamicha Jackson	34	82	146	52	4	300	8.8
Kayte Christensen	30	126	16	25	16	206	6.9
Plenette Pierson	33	80	22	19	13	198	6.0
Lisa Harrison	33	118	36	29	6	183	5.5
Slobodanka Tuvic	17	67	12	10	15	127	7.5
Edwina Brown	34	71	62	30	7	118	3.5
Iziane Castro Marques	16	12	9	6	1	69	4.3
Stacey Thomas	19	27	10	11	8	46	2.4
Edniesha Curry	20	11	24	9	0	33	1.7
Tamara Moore	11	19	8	5	4	33	3.0
Nevriye Yılmaz	5	3	2	0	0	14	2.8
Sonja Mallory	6	10	0	1	4	10	1.7
Dalma Ivanyi	4	4	2	0	1	6	1.5
Michaela Pavlickova	8	4	1	1	0	6	0.8
Felicia Ragland	3	2	2	2	0	5	1.7
Grace Daley	3	2	3	0	1	2	0.7
Tracy Reid	2	1	1	2	0	2	1.0
Gergana Slavtcheva	2	0	1	0	0	0	0.0
Charmin Smith	4	4	1	0	0	0	0.0
