= 2003 Minnesota Lynx season =

- Head coach: Suzie McConnell Serio
- Arena: Target Center

Results
- Record: 18–16 (.529)
- Place: 4th (Western)
- Playoff finish: Lost first round (2-1) to Los Angeles Sparks

The 2003 Minnesota Lynx season was the 5th season for the Minnesota Lynx of the Women's National Basketball Association, and the first season under head coach Suzie McConnell Serio.

The season tipped-off on Saturday, May 24, 2003, against the Sacramento Monarchs. The Lynx reached their first WNBA Playoffs, but lost in 3 games to the Los Angeles Sparks in the opening round.

== Offseason ==
=== Dispersal Draft ===
Pick	Player	Nationality	Previous Team
2	Sheri Sam (F/G)	United States	Miami Sol

=== WNBA draft ===
Round	Pick	Player	Nationality	College/School/Team
2	14	Teresa Edwards (G)	United States	Georgia
2	18	Jordan Adams (C)	United States	New Mexico
3	29	Carla Bennett (C)	United States	Drake

== Regular season ==
=== Season standings ===
Western Conference	W	L	PCT	GB	Home	Road	Conf.
Los Angeles Sparks ^{x}	24	10	.706	–	11–6	13–4	17–7
Houston Comets ^{x}	20	14	.588	4.0	14–3	6–11	14–10
Sacramento Monarchs ^{x}	19	15	.559	5.0	12–5	7–10	13–11
Minnesota Lynx ^{x}	18	16	.529	6.0	11–6	7–10	14–10
Seattle Storm ^{o}	18	16	.529	6.0	13–4	5–12	11–13
San Antonio Silver Stars ^{o}	12	22	.353	12.0	9–8	3–14	10–14
Phoenix Mercury ^{o}	8	26	.235	16.0	6–11	2–15	5–19

=== Season schedule ===
Date	Opponent	Score	Result	Record
May 24	Sacramento	72–71	Win	1–0
May 28	Los Angeles	80–83	Loss	1-1
May 30	@ San Antonio	75–65	Win	2–1
June 1	Houston	68-64 (OT)	Win	3–1
June 6	New York	60–70	Loss	3–2
June 10	@ Los Angeles	75–76	Loss	3-3
June 12	@ Sacramento	55–68	Loss	3–4
June 14	@ Seattle	77–72	Win	4-4
June 17	Houston	68–77	Loss	4–5
June 20	@ Charlotte	72–76	Loss	4–6
June 21	Indiana	66–58	Win	5–6
June 27	Phoenix	67–59	Win	6-6
June 29	@ Washington	59–50	Win	7–6
July 1	@ Houston	69–71	Loss	7-7
July 5	Cleveland	71–79	Loss	7–8
July 8	Sacramento	77–59	Win	8-8
July 10	Connecticut	83–75	Win	9–8
July 16	San Antonio	85–78	Win	10–8
July 17	@ Cleveland	61–70	Loss	10–9
July 20	Seattle	69–58	Win	11–9
July 23	@ Connecticut	70–84	Loss	11–10
July 25	San Antonio	81–54	Win	12–10
July 26	@ Indiana	70–65	Win	13–10
July 29	@ Houston	58–73	Loss	13–11
August 2	Seattle	73–71	Win	14–11
August 4	Phoenix	61–56	Win	15–11
August 6	@ Phoenix	49–56	Loss	15–12
August 8	@ Seattle	65–68	Loss	15–13
August 9	@ Sacramento	77–73	Win	16–13
August 14	Los Angeles	83–87	Loss	16–14
August 16	@ San Antonio	73–64	Win	17–14
August 20	@ Phoenix	69–66	Win	18–14
August 21	@ Los Angeles	65–88	Loss	18–15
August 23	Detroit	77-86 (OT)	Loss	18–16
August 28 (first round, G1)	Los Angeles	74–72	Win	1–0
August 30 (first round, G2)	@ Los Angeles	69–80	Loss	1-1
September 1 (first round, G3)	@ Los Angeles	64–74	Loss	1–2

== Player stats ==
Player	Minutes	Field goals	Rebounds	Assists	Steals	Blocks	Points
Katie Smith	1185	208	138	84	25	6	620
Sheri Sam	953	138	142	88	38	6	374
Svetlana Abrosimova	792	112	141	82	44	11	318
Tamika Williams	1121	129	209	44	34	10	303
Janell Burse	438	76	108	19	13	28	206
Teresa Edwards	854	63	105	148	41	11	181
Michele Van Gorp	528	70	107	17	10	20	175
Kristi Harrower	499	32	39	72	18	3	88
Shaunzinski Gortman	200	21	32	14	11	1	50
Jordan Adams	96	13	23	4	2	3	33
Georgia Schweitzer	118	6	18	7	3	1	15
