= 2003 WNBA season =

- League: Women's National Basketball Association
- Sport: Basketball
- Duration: May 22 - September 16, 2003
- Games: 34
- Teams: 14
- Total attendance: 2,100,630
- Average attendance: 8,826
- TV partner(s): ABC, ESPN, Oxygen

Draft
- Top draft pick: (United States) LaToya Thomas
- Picked by: Cleveland Rockers

Regular season
- Top seed: Detroit Shock
- Season MVP: (Australia) Lauren Jackson (Seattle)
- Top scorer: (Australia) Lauren Jackson (Seattle)

Playoffs
- Finals champions: Detroit Shock
- Runners-up: Los Angeles Sparks
- Finals MVP: (United States) Ruth Riley (Detroit)

WNBA seasons
- ← 2002 2004 →

The 2003 WNBA season was the Women's National Basketball Association's seventh season. It was the first season in which teams either folded or relocated, as well as the first to have teams that were not co-owned with NBA teams. The Orlando Miracle relocated to Connecticut and became the Connecticut Sun, the Utah Starzz relocated to San Antonio, Texas and became the San Antonio Silver Stars.

Meanwhile, both the Miami Sol and the Portland Fire folded, while the Charlotte Sting became the second WNBA team without a brother NBA team. A one-round dispersal draft was held on April 24, 2003 to reassign former Sol and Fire players.

The schedule increased from 32 games per team to 34. The season ended with the Detroit Shock winning their first WNBA Championship.

== Miami Sol and Portland Fire dispersal draft ==
On April 24, 2003, the dispersal draft for the Miami Sol and Portland Fire was held. This draft consisted of one round to re-assign the 26 players from the Sol and Fire rosters, who both folded after the end of 2002 WNBA season. The remaining fourteen teams in the WNBA were able to select one player from either roster in the draft. The order of selection was determined by teams' 2002 regular season records, going from worst to first. Former Sol and Fire players not selected in the dispersal draft became unrestricted free agents.

The top four picks were:

| Pick | Player | Nationality | New team | Former team | Ref. |
|---|---|---|---|---|---|
| 1 | Ruth Riley | United States | Detroit Shock | Miami Sol | |
| 2 | Sheri Sam | United States | Minnesota Lynx | Miami Sol | |
| 3 | Betty Lennox | United States | Cleveland Rockers | Miami Sol | |
| 4 | Tamicha Jackson | United States | Phoenix Mercury | Portland Fire | |

== Regular season ==
=== Standings ===
Eastern Conference

| Eastern Conference | W | L | PCT | GB | Home | Road | Conf. |
|---|---|---|---|---|---|---|---|
| Detroit Shock ^{x} | 25 | 9 | .735 | – | 13–4 | 12–5 | 18–6 |
| Charlotte Sting ^{x} | 18 | 16 | .529 | 7.0 | 13–4 | 5–12 | 12–12 |
| Connecticut Sun ^{x} | 18 | 16 | .529 | 7.0 | 10–7 | 8–9 | 11–13 |
| Cleveland Rockers ^{x} | 17 | 17 | .500 | 8.0 | 11–6 | 6–11 | 13–11 |
| Indiana Fever ^{o} | 16 | 18 | .471 | 9.0 | 11–6 | 5–12 | 12–12 |
| New York Liberty ^{o} | 16 | 18 | .471 | 9.0 | 11–6 | 5–12 | 11–13 |
| Washington Mystics ^{o} | 9 | 25 | .265 | 16.0 | 3–14 | 6–11 | 7–17 |

Western Conference

| Western Conference | W | L | PCT | GB | Home | Road | Conf. |
|---|---|---|---|---|---|---|---|
| Los Angeles Sparks ^{x} | 24 | 10 | .706 | – | 11–6 | 13–4 | 17–7 |
| Houston Comets ^{x} | 20 | 14 | .588 | 4.0 | 14–3 | 6–11 | 14–10 |
| Sacramento Monarchs ^{x} | 19 | 15 | .559 | 5.0 | 12–5 | 7–10 | 13–11 |
| Minnesota Lynx ^{x} | 18 | 16 | .529 | 6.0 | 11–6 | 7–10 | 14–10 |
| Seattle Storm ^{o} | 18 | 16 | .529 | 6.0 | 13–4 | 5–12 | 11–13 |
| San Antonio Silver Stars ^{o} | 12 | 22 | .353 | 12.0 | 9–8 | 3–14 | 10–14 |
| Phoenix Mercury ^{o} | 8 | 26 | .235 | 16.0 | 6–11 | 2–15 | 5–19 |

== Playoffs ==
**Conference semifinals** **Best-of-3**
E1 | **Detroit** | 2
E4 | Cleveland | 1
**Eastern Conference**
E2 | Charlotte | 0
E3 | **Connecticut** | 2
W1 | **Los Angeles** | 2
W4 | Minnesota | 1
**Western Conference**
W2 | Houston | 1
W3 | **Sacramento** | 2

**Conference finals** Best-of-3
E1 | **Detroit** | 2
E3 | Connecticut | 0
W1 | **Los Angeles** | 2
W3 | Sacramento | 1

**WNBA Finals**; Best-of-3
E1 | **Detroit** | 2
W1 | Los Angeles | 1

- **Bold** – Series winner
- Italic – Team with home-court advantage

== Awards ==
=== Individual ===
| Award | | Winner | Team |
|---|---|---|---|
| Most Valuable Player (MVP) | | Lauren Jackson | Seattle Storm |
| Finals MVP | | Ruth Riley | Detroit Shock |
| Defensive Player of the Year | | Sheryl Swoopes | Houston Comets |
| Most Improved Player | | Michelle Snow | Houston Comets |
| Peak Performers | **Scoring** | Lauren Jackson | Seattle Storm |
| Peak Performers | **Rebounding** | Chamique Holdsclaw | Washington Mystics |
| Rookie of the Year | | Cheryl Ford | Detroit Shock |
| Kim Perrot Sportsmanship Award | | Edna Campbell | Sacramento Monarchs |
| Coach of the Year | | Bill Laimbeer | Detroit Shock |

=== Team ===
| Award | | Player | Team |
|---|---|---|---|
| All-WNBA | First Team | Lauren Jackson | Seattle Storm |
| All-WNBA | First Team | Tamika Catchings | Indiana Fever |
| All-WNBA | First Team | Lisa Leslie | Los Angeles Sparks |
| All-WNBA | First Team | Katie Smith | Minnesota Lynx |
| All-WNBA | First Team | Sue Bird | Seattle Storm |
| All-WNBA | Second Team | Sheryl Swoopes | Houston Comets |
| All-WNBA | Second Team | Swin Cash | Detroit Shock |
| All-WNBA | Second Team | Cheryl Ford | Detroit Shock |
| All-WNBA | Second Team | Nikki Teasley | Los Angeles Sparks |
| All-WNBA | Second Team | Deanna Nolan | Detroit Shock |

=== Players of the Week ===
| Week ending | Player | Team |
|---|---|---|
| June 1 | Lisa Leslie | Los Angeles Sparks |
| June 8 | Lauren Jackson | Seattle Storm |
| June 15 | Lisa Leslie (2) | Los Angeles Sparks |
| June 22 | Swin Cash | Detroit Shock |
| June 29 | Tamika Catchings | Indiana Fever |
| July 6 | Sheryl Swoopes | Houston Comets |
| July 20 | Chamique Holdsclaw | Washington Mystics |
| July 27 | Lauren Jackson | Seattle Storm |
| August 3 | Swin Cash (2) | Detroit Shock |
| August 10 | Lauren Jackson (2) | Seattle Storm |
| August 17 | DeLisha Milton | Los Angeles Sparks |
| August 25 | Anna DeForge | Phoenix Mercury |

== Coaches ==
=== Eastern Conference ===
- Charlotte Sting: Trudi Lacey
- Cleveland Rockers: Dan Hughes
- Connecticut Sun: Mike Thibault
- Detroit Shock: Bill Laimbeer
- Indiana Fever: Nell Fortner
- New York Liberty: Richie Adubato
- Washington Mystics: Marianne Stanley

=== Western Conference ===
- Houston Comets: Van Chancellor
- Los Angeles Sparks: Michael Cooper
- Minnesota Lynx: Suzie McConnell Serio
- Phoenix Mercury: John Shumate
- Sacramento Monarchs: Maura McHugh and John Whisenant
- San Antonio Silver Stars: Candi Harvey and Shell Dailey
- Seattle Storm: Anne Donovan
