= 2003 Sacramento Monarchs season =

Season for baseball team from California

- Head coach: Maura McHugh; John Whisenant (interim)
- Arena: ARCO Arena

Results
- Record: 19–15 (.559)
- Place: 3rd (Western)
- Playoff finish: Lost Conference Finals (2-1) to Los Angeles Sparks

The 2003 WNBA season was the 7th season for the Sacramento Monarchs baseball team. The team returned to the conference finals for the first time in two years, only to lose in three games to the Los Angeles Sparks.

== Offseason ==
=== Dispersal Draft ===
Pick	Player	Nationality	Former team
5	DeMya Walker (F)	United States	Portland Fire

=== WNBA draft ===
Round	Pick	Player	Nationality	College/School/Team
1	2	Chantelle Anderson (C)	United States	Vanderbilt

== Regular season ==
=== Season standings ===
Western Conference	W	L	PCT	GB	Home	Road	Conf.
Los Angeles Sparks ^{x}	24	10	.706	–	11–6	13–4	17–7
Houston Comets ^{x}	20	14	.588	4.0	14–3	6–11	14–10
Sacramento Monarchs ^{x}	19	15	.559	5.0	12–5	7–10	13–11
Minnesota Lynx ^{x}	18	16	.529	6.0	11–6	7–10	14–10
Seattle Storm ^{o}	18	16	.529	6.0	13–4	5–12	11–13
San Antonio Silver Stars ^{o}	12	22	.353	12.0	9–8	3–14	10–14
Phoenix Mercury ^{o}	8	26	.235	16.0	6–11	2–15	5–19

=== Season schedule ===
Date	Opponent	Score	Result	Record
May 22	@ Phoenix	65-56	Win	1-0
May 24	@ Minnesota	71-72	Loss	1-1
May 30	Phoenix	69-49	Win	2-1
June 3	@ Seattle	56-70	Loss	2-2
June 5	@ Los Angeles	61-63	Loss	2-3
June 7	Los Angeles	61-79	Loss	2-4
June 10	@ Houston	66-71	Loss	2-5
June 12	Minnesota	68-55	Win	3-5
June 14	Indiana	67-79	Loss	3-6
June 17	@ New York	61-70	Loss	3-7
June 18	@ Washington	69-61	Win	4-7
June 21	Seattle	69-64	Win	5-7
June 24	San Antonio	57-60	Loss	5-8
June 28	@ Los Angeles	69-60	Win	6-8
July 2	Washington	83-62	Win	7-8
July 4	@ Connecticut	67-69	Loss	7-9
July 5	@ Charlotte	65-67	Loss	7-10
July 8	@ Minnesota	59-77	Loss	7-11
July 10	San Antonio	89-76	Win	8-11
July 15	@ Cleveland	66-57	Win	9-11
July 17	@ San Antonio	62-60	Win	10-11
July 19	Houston	71-74	Loss	10-12
July 24	New York	67-53	Win	11-12
July 26	Seattle	76-63	Win	12-12
July 31	Los Angeles	83-75	Win	13-12
August 3	Charlotte	76-60	Win	14-12
August 5	@ Houston	47-74	Loss	14-13
August 7	@ San Antonio	86-61	Win	15-13
August 9	Minnesota	73-77	Loss	15-14
August 15	Detroit	75-63	Win	16-14
August 16	@ Phoenix	65-61 (OT)	Win	17-14
August 21	Houston	62-54	Win	18-14
August 23	Phoenix	61-54	Win	19-14
August 25	@ Seattle	57-70	Loss	19-15
August 29; 1st Round, G1	Houston	65-59	Win	1-0
August 31; 1st Round, G2	@ Houston	48-69	Loss	1-1
September 2; 1st Round, G3	@ Houston	70-68	Win	2-1
September 5 West Finals, G1	Los Angeles	77-69	Win	3-1
September 7 West Finals, G2	@ Los Angeles	54-79	Loss	3-2
September 8 West Finals, G3	@ Los Angeles	63-66	Loss	3-3

== Player stats ==
Player	GP	REB	AST	STL	BLK	PTS
Yolanda Griffith	34	248	46	57	39	469
Tangela Smith	34	187	52	43	32	430
DeMya Walker	34	149	47	25	23	307
Edna Campbell	34	70	43	21	5	267
Kara Lawson	34	107	56	15	5	263
Ticha Penicheiro	34	119	229	61	1	183
Ruthie Bolton	33	57	35	33	2	149
Lady Grooms	34	46	29	17	5	111
Hamchetou Maiga-Ba	22	37	14	18	2	42
Chantelle Anderson	26	24	5	5	5	42
La'Keshia Frett	24	23	12	2	3	36
