= 2003 Houston Comets season =

- Head coach: Van Chancellor
- Arena: Compaq Center

Results
- Record: 20–14 (.588)
- Place: 2nd (Western)
- Playoff finish: Lost First Round (Sacramento) 2-1

The 2003 WNBA season was the seventh for the Houston Comets. Former WNBA MVP Cynthia Cooper came out of retirement and played four games with the Comets. This was their final year in the Compaq Center.

== Offseason ==
=== Dispersal Draft ===
Pick	Player	Nationality	Team	Previous WNBA Team
13	Ukari Figgs (G)	United States	Houston Comets	(from Portland Fire)

=== WNBA draft ===
Round	Pick	Player	Nationality	School/Club team
1	12	Allison Curtin	United States	Tulsa
2	19	Lori Nero	United States	Louisville
3	38	Constance Jinks	United States	UNLV
3	41	Oksana Rakhmatulina	Russia	Russia

== Regular season ==
=== Season standings ===
Western Conference	W	L	PCT	GB	Home	Road	Conf.
Los Angeles Sparks ^{x}	24	10	.706	–	11–6	13–4	17–7
Houston Comets ^{x}	20	14	.588	4.0	14–3	6–11	14–10
Sacramento Monarchs ^{x}	19	15	.559	5.0	12–5	7–10	13–11
Minnesota Lynx ^{x}	18	16	.529	6.0	11–6	7–10	14–10
Seattle Storm ^{o}	18	16	.529	6.0	13–4	5–12	11–13
San Antonio Silver Stars ^{o}	12	22	.353	12.0	9–8	3–14	10–14
Phoenix Mercury ^{o}	8	26	.235	16.0	6–11	2–15	5–19

=== Season schedule ===
Date	Opponent	Score	Result	Record
May 22	Seattle	75-64	Win	1-0
May 24	@ Phoenix	69-62	Win	2-0
May 30	Connecticut	83-91	Loss	2-1
June 1	@ Minnesota	64-68 (OT)	Loss	2-2
June 3	Phoenix	66-51	Win	3-2
June 6	@ Charlotte	58-69	Loss	3-3
June 7	@ Connecticut	58-65	Loss	3-4
June 10	Sacramento	71-66	Win	4-4
June 14	@ Phoenix	61-76	Loss	4-5
June 17	@ Minnesota	77-68	Win	5-5
June 20	@ San Antonio	69-76	Loss	5-6
June 21	Cleveland	63-62	Win	6-6
June 24	Los Angeles	62-71	Loss	6-7
June 28	San Antonio	64-49	Win	7-7
July 1	Minnesota	71-69	Win	8-7
July 5	Washington	76-54	Win	9-7
July 8	Indiana	60-56	Win	10-7
July 15	@ Seattle	55-69	Loss	10-8
July 18	@ Los Angeles	79-74	Win	11-8
July 19	@ Sacramento	74-71	Win	12-8
July 26	New York	61-53	Win	13-8
July 29	Minnesota	73-58	Win	14-8
August 1	@ San Antonio	53-63	Loss	14-9
August 2	San Antonio	64-55	Win	15-9
August 5	Sacramento	74-47	Win	16-9
August 7	@ Indiana	68-55	Win	17-9
August 8	@ Detroit	66-56	Win	18-9
August 10	Phoenix	69-46	Win	19-9
August 16	Los Angeles	63-64	Loss	19-10
August 18	@ New York	64-67	Loss	19-11
August 19	Seattle	52-47	Win	20-11
August 21	@ Sacramento	52-64	Loss	20-12
August 23	@ Seattle	64-71	Loss	20-13
August 25	@ Los Angeles	64-67	Loss	20-14
August 29 (First Round, Game 1)	@ Sacramento	59-65	Loss	0-1
August 31 (First Round, Game 2)	Sacramento	69-48	Win	1-1
September 2 (First Round, Game 3)	Sacramento	68-70	Loss	1-2
