= 1998 WNBA expansion draft =

1st WNBA expansion draft

General information
- Sport: Basketball
- Date: February 18, 1998

Overview
- League: WNBA
- Expansion teams: Detroit Shock; Washington Mystics

The Women's National Basketball Association (WNBA) held their first expansion draft on February 18, 1998 for the Detroit Shock and the Washington Mystics. This draft allowed the two new expansion teams to select players from the existing eight WNBA teams to fill their debut rosters prior to the start of the 1998 WNBA season.

== Key ==
Pos.	G	F	C
Position	Guard	Forward	Center

!	Denotes player who has been inducted to the Naismith Basketball Hall of Fame
^	Denotes player who has been inducted to the Women's Basketball Hall of Fame
^{+}	Denotes player who has been selected for at least one All-Star Game
^{x}	Denotes player who has been selected for at least one All-WNBA Team

== Initial player allocation ==
Prior to the expansion draft, the WNBA allocated four players to the Detroit Shock and the Washington Mystics on January 27, 1998 in no particular order.

Pick	Player	Position	Nationality	Team	School / club team	WNBA years (Note: Number of years played in the WNBA prior to the draft)	Career with the franchise (Note: Number of years played for expansion franchise that drafted player)	Ref.
1	Cindy Brown ^{x}	F	United States	Detroit Shock	Seattle Reign (ABL)	0	1998–1999	
2	Razija Mujanović	C	Bosnia and Herzegovina	Detroit Shock	Microcamp Campinas (Brazil)	0	1998	
3	Nikki McCray ^{+} ^	G	United States	Washington Mystics	Columbus Quest (ABL)	0	1998–2001	
4	Alessandra Santos de Oliveira	C	Brazil	Washington Mystics	Comense (Italy)	0	1998–1999	

== Expansion draft ==
The following players were drafted for the rosters of the Shock and Mystics from the league's existing teams:

Pick	Player	Position	Nationality	New team	Former team	WNBA years	Career with the franchise	Ref.
1	Rhonda Blades	G	United States	Detroit Shock	New York Liberty	1	1998	
2	Heidi Burge	F	United States	Washington Mystics	Los Angeles Sparks	1	1998	
3	Tajama Abraham	C	United States	Detroit Shock	Sacramento Monarchs	1	1998	
4	Penny Moore	F	United States	Washington Mystics	Charlotte Sting	1	1998–1999	
5	Tara Williams	G	United States	Detroit Shock	Phoenix Mercury	1	—	
6	Deborah Carter	F	United States	Washington Mystics	Utah Starzz	1	1998	
7	Lynette Woodard ^ !	G	United States	Detroit Shock	Cleveland Rockers	1	1998	
8	Tammy Jackson	F/C	United States	Washington Mystics	Houston Comets	1	1998	
