= Alessandra Santos de Oliveira =

Brazilian basketball player (born 1973)

Personal information
- Born: 2 December 1973 (age 52) São Paulo, Brazil
Medal record
Women's basketball
Representing Brazil
Olympic Games
Silver medal – second place	1996 Atlanta	Team competition
Bronze medal – third place	2000 Sydney	Team competition
World Championship
Gold medal – first place	1994 Australia	Team competition
Pan American Games
Bronze medal – third place	2003 Santo Domingo	Team competition

Alessandra Santos de Oliveira (born 2 December 1973 in São Paulo) is a Brazilian former basketball player who spent 17 years in the national team, winning the 1994 FIBA World Championship for Women and two Olympic medals, silver in Atlanta 1996, and bronze in Sydney 2000, along with a fourth place in the 2004 Summer Olympics and the 1998 and 2006 World Championships. She has also competed in 10 countries, including three WNBA teams - Washington Mystics (1998–99), Indiana Fever (2000) and Seattle Storm (2001).

== WNBA ==
On 27 January 1998, Oliveira was assigned to the Washington Mystics as part of the league's initial player allocation. Her debut game was played on 11 June 1998 in a 57 - 83 loss to the Charlotte Sting where she recorded 5 points, 3 rebounds and 1 steal. During her rookie season, after losing her starting position to Heidi Burge, Oliveira would miss 14 straight games with the Mystics from 14 July to 16 August. She did start in 12 of her 16 played games and her averages of the season were 11.0 points and 8.1 rebounds per game. Even with her productive stat line, the Mystics finished with a still franchise-worst 3 - 27 record (2 - 14 in the games where Oliveira played).

In the 1999 season, Oliveira would lose her starting Center position after 5 games to teammate Murriel Page and her minutes per game dropped from 30.1 in her rookie season to 16.6 in her sophomore season. The Mystics then traded Oliveira on 11 July to the Houston Comets for Nyree Roberts. Roberts would go on to play only 8 games with the Mystics and those were the final games of her WNBA career. While Oliveira, did not play a single game for the Comets and sat out the rest of the 1999 season.

For the 2000 season, Oliveira signed a contract with the New York Liberty on 2 May but was waived during the same month on 28 May. Eleven days later on 7 June, she signed a contract with the Indiana Fever but she would only play three games for the team recording 3 points and 3 rebounds in 11 total minutes.

Oliveira's final playing days in the WNBA would be spent as a member of the Seattle Storm. She first signed with the team on 30 April 2001 but had her contract suspended on 27 May. She was able to return to the team and play during the 2001 season. In just 10 games with the Storm (winning once and losing the other nine games), she averaged 1.3 points and 1.6 rebounds per game. She would be waived by the Storm on 24 May 2002, less than a month before the 2002 season started. Oliveira never made the playoffs during her career and her final game ever was played on 14 August 2001 in a 62 - 72 loss to the Sacramento Monarchs. In her final game, Oliveira played for five and half minutes and recorded 2 points and 1 rebound.

== Career statistics ==
Legend
GP	Games played	GS	Games started	MPG	Minutes per game	RPG	Rebounds per game
APG	Assists per game	SPG	Steals per game	BPG	Blocks per game	PPG	Points per game
TO	Turnovers per game	FG%	Field-goal percentage	3P%	3-point field-goal percentage	FT%	Free-throw percentage
**Bold**	Career best	°	League leader

=== WNBA ===
==== Regular season ====
Year	Team	GP	GS	MPG	FG%	3P%	FT%	RPG	APG	SPG	BPG	TO	PPG
1998	Washington	**16**	**12**	**30.1**	.516	–	**.463**	**8.1**	**.1**	**.8**	**.4**	3.4	**11.0**
1999	Washington	13	6	16.6	.564	–	.318	3.2	**.1**	.1	.2	1.2	3.9
2000	Indiana	3	0	3.7	**1.000**	–	.167	1.0	.0	.0	.0	.7	1.0
2001	Seattle	10	1	6.2	.286	–	.455	1.6	.0	.0	.0	**.3**	1.3
Career	5 years, 3 teams	42	19	18.3	.511	–	.429	4.5	.0	.3	.2	1.8	5.8
