= Penny Moore =

American basketball player (born 1969)

Personal information
- Born: January 25, 1969 (age 57) Falls Church, Virginia, U.S.
- Listed height: 6 ft 0 in (1.83 m)

Career information
- High school: J.E.B. Stuart High School (Falls Church, Virginia)
- College: Long Beach State (1987–1991)
- WNBA draft: 1998: 1st round, 4th overall pick
- Drafted by: Washington Mystics
- Position: Forward
- Number: 24

Career history
- 1997: Charlotte Sting
- 1998–2000: Washington Mystics

Career highlights
- First-team All-Big West Conference (1991)
- Stats at Basketball Reference

Penny Moore (born January 25, 1969) is a former Women's National Basketball Association (WNBA) player. She played in the league from its inception in 1997 to 2000. She played for the Charlotte Sting in 1997, then for the Washington Mystics in 1998–2000. She attended J.E.B. Stuart High School in Falls Church, Virginia.

== USA Basketball ==
Moore was named to the USA Basketball Women's Junior National Team (now called the U19 team). The team participated in the second Junior World Championship, held in Bilbao, Spain in July 1989. The USA team lost their opening game to South Korea in overtime, then lost a two-point game to Australia. After winning their next game against Bulgaria, the USA team again fell in a close game, losing by three points to Czechoslovakia. After beating Zaire in their next game, the USA team played Spain, and fell three points short. Moore averaged 3.0 points per game. The USA team finished in seventh place.

== WNBA ==
Moore started her WNBA career playing for the Sting in the inaugural 1997 season. Her debut game was played on June 22, 1997, in a 59 - 76 loss to the Phoenix Mercury. In her first game, Moore played for 28 minutes and recorded 4 points, 4 rebounds and 3 assists. With her season averages of 4.8 points, 2.6 rebounds and 1.0 assist per game, Moore helped the Sting to a 15 - 13 record in the 1997 season. Unfortunately, the team would be eliminated in the playoffs semi-finals by the Houston Comets. The 1997 playoffs was the only time Moore made the playoffs in her career.

For her sophomore season, Moore was selected with the 4th pick in the expansion draft by the Washington Mystics. She became a starting forward for the Mystics and her minutes per game increased from 19.3 in her rookie season to 26.1. Her points, rebounds and assists per game all increased to 8.2, 3.7 and 1.6 per game respectively. Moore played in 29 of the Mystics' 30 games, missing the team's final regular season game on August 19, 1998. Ironically, this game was the Mystic's 4th matchup against Moore's former team (Sting). The Mystics' previously played the Sting on June 11 (season opener), July 17 and July 21. In all 4 of the Mystics' matchups against the Sting, the Mystics would endure blowout losses: a 26-point loss on June 11, a 30-point loss on July 17, a 17-point loss on July 21, and a 36-point loss on August 19. The July 21 matchup saw Moore record a career-high 5 steals. The Mystics finished the 1998 season with a record of 3 - 27, a record that still stands as the worst in WNBA history as of 2023.

For the 1999 season, after playing in 4 games for the Mystics, Moore was placed on the injured list after an MRI revealed that she had a shoulder injury. This injury caused her to miss the rest of the 1999 season.

Before the start of the 2000 season, Moore would be waived by the Mystics on May 12, 2000, and she missed both the 2000 and 2001 seasons.

In 2002, Moore would resign with the Mystics but before the season started, she would be waived again on May 6, 2002, and then missed the entire 2002 season. After not playing for 3 seasons, Moore subsequently retired from the WNBA. Her final game ever was played on June 22, 1999, in a 76 - 79 loss to the Phoenix Mercury. In her final game, Moore played for 5 minutes and recorded 1 block and no other stats.

== Career statistics ==
Legend
GP	Games played	GS	Games started	MPG	Minutes per game	RPG	Rebounds per game
APG	Assists per game	SPG	Steals per game	BPG	Blocks per game	PPG	Points per game
TO	Turnovers per game	FG%	Field-goal percentage	3P%	3-point field-goal percentage	FT%	Free-throw percentage
**Bold**	Career best	°	League leader

=== WNBA career statistics ===
==== Regular season ====
Year	Team	GP	GS	MPG	FG%	3P%	FT%	RPG	APG	SPG	BPG	TO	PPG
1997	Charlotte	28	9	19.3	**35.8**	20.0	51.6	2.6	1.0	0.6	0.4	1.6	4.8
1998	Washington	**29**	**26**	**26.1**	34.4	**20.7**	**71.7**	**3.7**	**1.6**	**1.5**	**0.7**	2.1	**8.2**
1999	Washington	4	0	4.8	33.3	0.0	0.0	0.3	0.0	0.0	0.3	**1.0**	0.5
Career	3 years, 2 teams	61	35	21.5	35.0	20.5	63.6	3.0	1.2	1.0	0.5	1.8	6.1

==== Playoffs ====
Year	Team	GP	GS	MPG	FG%	3P%	FT%	RPG	APG	SPG	BPG	TO	PPG
1997	Charlotte	1	0	17.0	37.5	0.0	50.0	2.0	0.0	2.0	0.0	1.0	7.0
Career	1 year, 1 team	1	0	17.0	37.5	0.0	50.0	2.0	0.0	2.0	0.0	1.0	7.0

=== College ===
Year	Team	GP	GS	MPG	FG%	3P%	FT%	RPG	APG	SPG	BPG	TO	PPG
1988–89	Long Beach State	**35**	-	-	45.2	**30.0**	61.3	3.8	1.4	1.3	**1.0**	-	6.8
1989–90	Long Beach State	33	-	-	45.0	25.8	**65.6**	**7.6**	**2.7**	**1.8**	0.9	-	**14.6**
1990–91	Long Beach State	27	-	-	**45.4**	25.0	59.8	7.3	2.4	1.4	0.8	-	13.1
**Career**		95	-	-	45.2	26.0	62.3	6.1	2.1	1.5	0.9	-	11.3
Statistics retrieved from Sports-Reference.
