= Heidi Burge =

American basketball player (1971–2026)

Heidi Burge Horton

Personal information
- Born: November 12, 1971 Harbor City, California, U.S.
- Died: October 5, 2026 (aged 54) Houston, Texas, U.S.
- Listed height: 6 ft 5 in (1.96 m)
- Listed weight: 178 lb (81 kg)

Career information
- High school: Palos Verdes (Palos Verdes Estates, California)
- College: Virginia (1989–1993)
- Position: Center / power forward

Career history
- 1993-1994: AS Montferrand
- 1994-1995: GYSEV-Sopron
- 1995-1996: Cariparma
- 1996-1997: Panathinaikos
- 1997: Los Angeles Sparks
- 1998: Washington Mystics
- Stats at Basketball Reference
Medals
WUG
Gold medal – first place	1993 Buffalo	Team competition

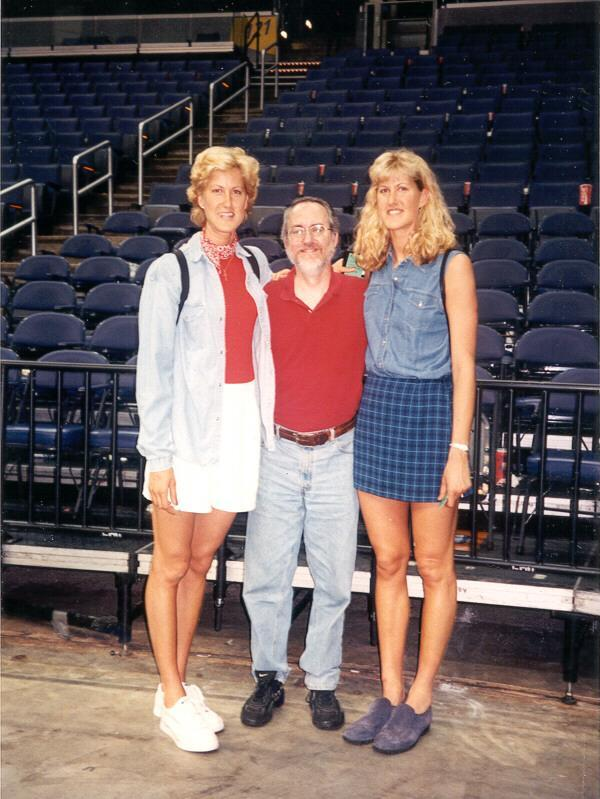
Heidi Burge (left) and Heather Burge (right) with a fan in 1999.

Heidi Ann Horton (née Burge; November 12, 1971 – October 5, 2026) was an American professional women's basketball player who played overseas from 1993 to 1997 and then played for the Los Angeles Sparks and Washington Mystics of the WNBA from 1997 to 1998. She was the twin sister of Heather (Burge) Quella.

== Early life ==
Heidi Ann Burge was born on November 12, 1971. As a 5-month-old in 1972, Heidi Burge was found to have a second aorta wrapped around and constricting her windpipe which needed to be removed through open-heart surgery. At the time, she was given only a 50-50 chance of survival.

Prior to starting high school, the Burge family moved to Palos Verdes Estates, California, so that the sisters could attend Palos Verdes High School. Although Burge was not originally interested in playing basketball, as she preferred theater and volleyball, after being asked to try out by the ladies basketball coach her freshman year, she quickly fell in love with the game. Burge brought success to the team, transforming the Sea Kings into Southern Section 3-A champions in 1987 and concluding her high-school career second on the school's all-time list of girls' scorers with 1,183 points.

After graduation, both sisters accepted scholarships to attend the University of Virginia and play for the Lady Cavaliers basketball team. Although the pair would attend the same school, they did not live together or even have the same circle of friends. The Burges also did not play the same position on the court, as Heidi preferred the outside game and Heather (who is 6 minutes older) played inside against the opposing team's center and was the go-to scorer in the paint.

== College and overseas career ==
UVA won right away, with Burge averaging 8.3 points and 6.3 rebounds a game her freshman year, and the pair playing a big part in leading the team to the school's first three, and to date only, Atlantic Coast Conference championships (in 1990, 1992 and 1993) and Women's NCAA Final Four appearances (1990–1992). Following the school year in 1989 and 1990, Burge was asked to play for USA Basketball U18 and U19 basketball teams and won a gold medal at the 1990 US Olympic Festival.

Heidi Burge Basketball Photo

Things did not always go smoothly for the Burges in their freshman and sophomore seasons, as the pair were frequently in foul trouble, rarely played at the same time on the court (due to their foul situation), fought with teammates and each other, and were considered by their teammates to be both "soft" and prone to mistakes and turnovers.

However, during their time with UVA, the pair averaged 24 points and seven rebounds per game and teamed with NCAA All-Americans Dawn Staley and Tammi Reiss to lead the Cavaliers to three consecutive Final Fours and a 1991 overtime loss to Tennessee in the championship game. In all three trips to the Final Four, the Cavaliers lost to the eventual NCAA Champion (losing to Stanford in 1990 and 1992). Virginia's 1992 campaign ended with a school-record 32 wins (32-2, 15–1 in the ACC), and the team was ranked #1 in the Associated Press Poll and second in the USA Today Coaches Poll at the end of the regular season. Prior to her senior year in 1993, Burge was among only 54 UVA incoming seniors given the privilege of living in one of the residences in The Lawn, a portion of the campus that makes up much of the original buildings constructed on campus in 1817–19. Also in 1993, Virginia lost in the East Region Championship to NCAA runner-up Ohio State. The Lady Cavs lost all four tournament games by a total of only 15 points, with the biggest score differential being their 9-point loss to Stanford in 1990.

While at UVA, Burge was a three-year member of the ACC Academic Honor Roll (1991–1993). As of May 2011, Burge was tied for third in career games played with 134, sixth in rebounds with 853 boards, sixth in blocked shots with 108 blocks, twelfth in career double-doubles with 14, and 21st in career scoring, with 1,191 points.

After graduating with a bachelor's degree with a dual major in Rhetoric and Communications Studies and Spanish, Burge played professionally for six years overseas with AS Montferrand in France (1993–94), GYSEV-Sopron in Hungary (1994–95), Cariparma in Italy (1995–96), and finally Panathinaikos in Athens, Greece (1996–1997).

== WNBA career ==
Following her season in Greece, Burge accepted an offer to play in the newly formed Women's National Basketball Association (WNBA) for the Los Angeles Sparks alongside four-time Olympic gold medal winner Lisa Leslie. Her debut game was played on June 25, 1997 in a 74 - 54 win over the Charlotte Sting where she recorded 1 point, 4 rebounds, 1 assist, 2 steals and 1 block. Although the team led the league in scoring (with 74 points per game) and were fourth (out of eight teams) in defensive rating, the Sparks finished a disappointing 14-14 and out of the playoff picture.

Heidi Burge in action photo

On February 18, 1998, Burge was taken by the Washington Mystics as their first selection and second selection overall in the expansion draft. Burge was featured as one of the key Mystics players prior to the start of the season and included in team marketing. During the season, Burge would start half the team's 30 games, finish second on the team in both field goal and three point percentages and fourth in minutes, points, rebounds, and blocked shots, but it wouldn't be enough, as the team would finish a league-worst 3-27 despite the presence of Olympian Nikki McCray. Her stay with the Mystics was short as well, as Burge was released on June 9, 1999 by the team following her injury-plagued 1998 season (in which she struggled with a lower back injury and a broken finger) and after drafting all-star forward Chamique Holdsclaw.

Burge's final game in the WNBA was played on August 19, 1998 in a 69 - 105 blowout loss to the Charlotte Sting where she recorded 5 points, 1 rebound and 2 steals.

Among the highlights of her WNBA career was a game-high 11 rebounds and nine points against the Phoenix Mercury in 1997, a 14-point, 9 rebound effort in a 75–68 victory over the Utah Starzz the same year, and a career-high 19 points against the Mercury in August 1998. Upon retirement, one of Burge's biggest professional disappointments was that she was never able to play with or against Heather.

== USA Basketball ==
Burge was named to the USA team for the 1993 World University Games competition in Buffalo, New York. The team had a 6–2 record and won the bronze medal. Burge averaged 4.4 points per game.

Heidi Burge and friend

== Post-retirement ==
After leaving basketball in January 2000, Burge moved to Houston, Texas after accepting a job as a press and media broadcasting intern for the WNBA's Houston Comets. Working part time as a color commentator for the team, Burge later turned down a full-time color position in order to start a family. She lived there with her husband, Patrick Horton, whom she married on September 29, 2001, and had two children, Jonathan (born 2003) and Holly (born 2005). Burge worked as a physical therapist specializing in lower back injuries (which was inspired by her own career-ending lower back injury) and as a youth basketball instructor at various Houston-area camps including Post University and Basketball Hoops School. She also worked as a private coach.

At 6 feet 5 inches each, the Burge sisters were recognized in 1991 by Guinness World Records as the world's tallest female twins. This record was broken in 2004 by Ann and Claire Recht. The Disney television movie Double Teamed, which was released in 2002, is based on their life stories and achievements in high school basketball. In the movie, Burge is played by Annie McElwain.

== Death ==
Burge was diagnosed with stage IV glioblastoma, a form of brain cancer, on October 17, 2025. She succeeded in battling the cancer to temporary remission through tumor resection, radiation, and chemotherapy, along with other therapies. The tumors returned in July 2026, and she entered palliative care in September. With family and friends present, Heidi died on October 5, 2026, at the age of 54. Burge was survived by her husband, sister Heather, son, and daughter.

== Career statistics ==
Legend
GP	Games played	GS	Games started	MPG	Minutes per game	RPG	Rebounds per game
APG	Assists per game	SPG	Steals per game	BPG	Blocks per game	PPG	Points per game
TO	Turnovers per game	FG%	Field-goal percentage	3P%	3-point field-goal percentage	FT%	Free-throw percentage
**Bold**	Career best	°	League leader

=== WNBA ===
==== Regular season ====
Year	Team	GP	GS	MPG	FG%	3P%	FT%	RPG	APG	SPG	BPG	TO	PPG
1997	Los Angeles	22	6	12.8	.444	.000	.511	3.1	.7	**.5**	**.5**	**1.1**	4.0
1998	Washington	**30**	**15**	**16.7**	**.509**	**.286**	**.597**	**3.3**	**.9**	**.5**	**.5**	2.4	**6.7**
Career	2 years, 2 teams	52	21	15.1	.489	.182	.561	3.2	.8	.5	.5	1.8	5.5

==== Playoffs ====
Year	Team	GP	GS	MPG	FG%	3P%	FT%	RPG	APG	SPG	BPG	TO	PPG
1999	Sacramento	1	0	4.0	50.0	0.0	50.0	2.0	0.0	0.0	0.0	1.0	3.0

=== College ===
Year	Team	GP	GS	MPG	FG%	3P%	FT%	RPG	APG	SPG	BPG	TO	PPG
1989–90	Virginia	**35**	-	-	42.0	0.0	66.7	6.4	0.5	-	0.8	-	8.2
1990–91	Virginia	34	-	-	45.5	**35.7**	68.2	5.4	1.0	**0.6**	**1.0**	-	8.9
1991–92	Virginia	33	-	-	**48.6**	0.0	66.7	6.2	1.4	0.5	0.7	-	**10.0**
1992–93	Virginia	32	-	-	43.7	25.0	**73.2**	**7.6**	**2.2**	**0.6**	0.7	-	8.5
**Career**		134	-	-	45.0	23.9	68.8	6.4	1.2	0.6	0.8	-	8.9
Statistics retrieved from Sports-Reference.

== See also ==
- List of twins
- List of University of Virginia people
