= Deborah Carter =

American basketball player (born 1972)

Personal information
- Born: January 3, 1972 (age 54)
- Listed height: 6 ft 0 in (1.83 m)
- Listed weight: 185 lb (84 kg)

Career information
- College: Georgia
- Position: Guard-Forward
- Stats at Basketball Reference

Deborah Carter (born January 3, 1972) is a former professional basketball player who played in the WNBA for the Utah Starzz in 1997 and Washington Mystics in 1998.

== WNBA ==
Carter participated in the WNBA's inaugural season in 1997 as a member of the Utah Starzz. Her debut game was played on June 21, 1997, in a 61 - 73 loss to the Sacramento Monarchs where she recorded 8 points on 4-5 FG shooting. In her rookie season, Carter played in 18 of the Starzz' 28 games (missing an entire 3 weeks from July 22 to August 12) and averaged 3.9 points and 2.7 rebounds as the Starzz finished with a 7 - 21 record.

On February 18, 1998, Carter was selected by the Washington Mystics in the expansion draft. For her time with the Mystics, she averaged 3.8 points and 2.2 rebounds in 15.0 mpg. The Mystics finished with a league worst 3 - 27 record (which as of 2023, still stands as the worst record in WNBA history). Carter did not play in the WNBA after the 1998 season and thus the final game of her career was the Mystics' final regular season game that year. The game took place on August 19, 1998, and the Mystics would suffer a 69 - 105 blowout loss to the Charlotte Sting where Carter recorded 9 points, 3 rebounds, 3 assists and 1 block.

For her career, Carter played in 47 games and averaged 3.9 points and 2.4 rebounds.

== Career statistics ==
Legend
GP	Games played	GS	Games started	MPG	Minutes per game	RPG	Rebounds per game
APG	Assists per game	SPG	Steals per game	BPG	Blocks per game	PPG	Points per game
TO	Turnovers per game	FG%	Field-goal percentage	3P%	3-point field-goal percentage	FT%	Free-throw percentage
**Bold**	Career best	°	League leader

=== WNBA ===
==== Regular season ====
Year	Team	GP	GS	MPG	FG%	3P%	FT%	RPG	APG	SPG	BPG	TO	PPG
1997	Utah	18	**7**	**15.9**	**.385**	.143	.714	**2.7**	.4	**.7**	**.1**	**.8**	**3.9**
1998	Washington	**29**	6	15.0	.271	**.245**	**.808**	2.2	**.8**	.6	**.1**	1.4	3.8
Career	2 years, 2 teams	47	13	15.3	.311	.232	.775	2.4	.7	.6	.1	1.1	3.9
