= Judy Holland-Burton =

Judy Holland-Burton (born 1955 or 1956) is a retired American basketball executive. After working at The Frederick News-Post from 1978 to 1981, Holland moved to the NBA and became the secretary of the Washington Bullets. With the Bullets from 1981 to 1996, Holland held multiple roles including vice president positions in operations and community relations. When the Bullets were renamed to the Washington Wizards in 1997, Holland-Burton continued to work in community relations as a senior vice-president. With the Wizards parent company, Holland-Burton held vice president and senior vice president roles for the Washington Sports and Entertainment, Inc. between the 1990s and 2000s. Apart from the NBA, Holland-Burton held general managerial duties in the WNBA as the senior vice president of operations for the Washington Mystics between 2002 and 2005. In 2010, Holland-Burton left sports to work in consulting.

== Early life and education ==
Judy Holland was born in Frederick, Maryland in the mid-1950s. While completing her education, Holland was a cheerleader in Frederick and during her post-secondary education in Virginia. During her time at Hampton Institute, Holland studied communications and wrote death notices as an intern for The Frederick News-Post.

== Career ==
After completing her post-secondary education, Holland became the first African American woman reporter for The Frederick News-Post when she started her position in 1978. In 1981, Holland moved from journalism to the NBA when she started working with the Washington Bullets as their secretary. After holding positions in business and sports management for the Bullets, Holland was promoted as the team's director of community relations in 1988. She remained in her director position until she was named vice president of operations for the Bullets in 1991.

When the Washington Sports and Entertainment was created as the parent company of the Bullets and Washington Capitals in 1995, Holland-Burton continued her operations position while adding a vice-president position in community relations. While in her community relations position from 1996 to 1997, Holland-Burton prepared the activities that were to be held when the MCI Center was opened as the Bullets new arena. That year, the Bullets were renamed to the Washington Wizards in 1997.

In the 2000s, Holland continued to work in community relations for the Washington Sports and Entertainment as their senior vice president. While holding her community relations position with the Wizards, Holland was named the senior vice president of operations for the Washington Mystics in 2002. With the Mystics, Judy Holland-Burton held general managerial duties until she resigned from the WNBA team in 2005. After ending her managerial role with the Mystics, it was stated that Holland-Burton would resume working with the Washington Sports and Entertainment in 2005 as their senior vice president. She continued to hold her community relations position with the Wizards until the 2009–2010 season. In 2010, Holland-Burton retired from the Washington organization to start a career in consulting.
