= Cathy Parson =

American basketball coach

Catherine Parson (born May 4, 1961) is a women's basketball coach and a former collegiate basketball player.

== Early life ==
Parson is a native of Hagerstown, Maryland.

== College career ==
Parson played basketball at West Virginia, where she was the first female athlete to receive an athletic scholarship there. She became one of the school's best players, scoring a school record 2,128 points in four seasons. She was the school's first female athlete to have her jersey retired, and the first women to be a member of the WVU Sports Hall of Fame.

== Coaching career ==
Parson was an assistant coach at Providence College from 1985 to 1988.

From 1988 to 1998, she coached at Christopher Newport University, where she compiled a 183–83 record. While at CNU, she won two Dixie Intercollegiate Athletic Conference coach of the year awards.

She served as the interim head coach of the Washington Mystics in 1998.

From 2000 to 2008, she was the head coach at Howard University, where she compiled a 96–127 record. She led the Lady Bison to two regular season MEAC titles. The 2001 team won the MEAC tournament title. In both 2000 and 2001, she was named the MEAC coach of the year. She coached the MEAC player of the year in Andrea Gardner, who was also drafted in the WNBA.

From 2013 to 2014, Parson was the head coach of Frostburg State University's women's basketball team. She next coached at Stratford University from 2018 to 2019. In 2020, she became the head women's basketball coach at Central State University.

== Head coaching record ==
Legend
Regular season	G	Games coached	W	Games won	L	Games lost	W–L %	Win–loss %
Playoffs	PG	Playoff games	PW	Playoff wins	PL	Playoff losses	PW–L %	Playoff win–loss %

=== WNBA ===
Team	Year	G	W	L	W–L%	Finish	PG	PW	PL	PW–L%	Result
Washington	1998	12	1	11	.083	5th in Eastern	—	—	—	—	Missed playoffs
