= 1998 Washington Mystics season =

- Head coach: Jim Lewis (fired Jul. 24, 2–16 record); Cathy Parson (interim, 1–11 record)
- Arena: MCI Center

Results
- Record: 3–27 (.100)
- Place: 5th (Eastern)
- Playoff finish: Did not qualify

The 1998 WNBA season was the first for the Washington Mystics.

== Transactions ==
=== WNBA allocation draft ===
Player	Nationality	School/Team/Country
Alessandra Santos de Oliveira	Brazil	Comense (Italy)
Nikki McCray	United States	Columbus Quest

=== WNBA expansion draft ===
Player	Nationality	Former WNBA Team
Tammy Jackson	United States	Houston Comets
Deborah Carter	United States	Utah Starzz
Penny Moore	United States	Charlotte Sting
Heidi Burge	United States	Los Angeles Sparks

=== WNBA draft ===
Round	Pick	Player	Nationality	School/Team/Country
1	3	Murriel Page	United States	Florida
2	13	Rita Williams	United States	UConn
3	23	Angela Hamblin	United States	Iowa
4	33	Angela Jackson	United States	Texas

=== Transactions ===
Date	Transaction
December 29, 1997	Hired Jim Lewis as Head Coach
January 27, 1998	Drafted Alessandra Santos de Oliveira and Nikki McCray in the 1998 WNBA Allocation Draft
February 18, 1998	Drafted Tammy Jackson, Deborah Carter, Penny Moore and Heidi Burge in the 1998 WNBA expansion draft
April 29, 1998	Drafted Murriel Page, Rita Williams, Angela Hamblin and Angela Jackson in the 1998 WNBA draft
June 23, 1998	Waived Tammy Jackson
July 24, 1998	Fired Jim Lewis as Head Coach
July 24, 1998	Hired Cathy Parsons as Interim Head Coach
July 31, 1998	Waived Angela Jackson and Leila Sobral
July 31, 1998	Signed Leslie Johnson and Margo Graham

== Roster ==
1998 Washington Mystics roster
Players
Coaches

Pos.	No.	Nat.	Name	Height	Weight	DOB	From	Yrs
C	35	(United States)	Brown, La'Shawn	6' 3" (1.91m)	180 lb (82kg)	1972-12-01	Louisiana Tech	R
C	34	(United States)	Burge, Heidi	6' 5" (1.96m)	185 lb (84kg)	1971-11-12	Virginia	1
G/F	9	(United States)	Carter, Deborah	6' 1" (1.85m)	185 lb (84kg)	1972-01-03	Georgia	1
G	12	(United States)	Chaconas, Keri	5' 9" (1.75m)	151 lb (68kg)	1974-12-21	George Mason	R
C	32	(United States)	Graham, Margo	6' 4" (1.93m)	235 lb (107kg)	1970-12-18	Houston	R
C	32	(United States)	Jackson, Angela	6' 4" (1.93m)		1976-03-30	Texas	R
F/C	28	(United States)	Jackson, Tammy	6' 2" (1.88m)	190 lb (86kg)	1962-12-03	Florida	1
F	28	(United States)	Johnson, Leslie	6' 2" (1.88m)	220 lb (100kg)	1975-01-12	Western Kentucky	R
G	15	(United States)	McCray, Nikki	5' 11" (1.8m)	158 lb (72kg)	1971-12-17	Tennessee	R
F	24	(United States)	Moore, Penny	6' 0" (1.83m)		1969-01-25	Long Beach State	1
F	10	(United States)	Page, Murriel	6' 2" (1.88m)	160 lb (73kg)	1975-09-18	Florida	R
C	11	(Brazil)	Santos de Oliveira, Alessandra	6' 5" (1.96m)	181 lb (82kg)	1973-12-02		R
G	30	(United States)	Shuler, Adrienne	5' 6" (1.68m)		1969-04-24	Georgia	R
F	32	(Brazil)	Sobral, Leila	6' 1" (1.85m)		1974-12-22		R
G	23	(United States)	Williams, Rita	5' 6" (1.68m)	135 lb (61kg)	1976-01-14	Connecticut	R

Head coach
(United States) Jim Lewis (West Virginia)
Assistant coaches
(United States) Cathy Parson
(United States) Wes Unseld Jr.

Legend

- (C) Team captain
- (DP) Unsigned draft pick
- (FA) Free agent
- (S) Suspended
- Injured

== Schedule ==
=== Regular season ===
1998 game log
Total: 3–27 (Home: 2–12; Road: 1–15)
June: 1–7 (Home: 1–2; Road: 0–5)

Game	Date	Team	Score	High points	High rebounds	High assists	Location Attendance	Record
1	June 11	@ Charlotte	L 57–83	Nikki McCray (19)	Carter; Moore (4)	Nikki McCray (6)	Charlotte Coliseum	0–1
2	June 13	@ Utah	L 77–78	Nikki McCray (26)	Alessandra Santos de Oliveira (18)	Nikki McCray (5)	Delta Center	0–2
3	June 15	@ Phoenix	L 54–69	Nikki McCray (20)	Murriel Page (11)	Nikki McCray (4)	America West Arena	0–3
4	June 19	Utah	W 85–76	Nikki McCray (29)	Alessandra Santos de Oliveira (7)	Nikki McCray (6)	MCI Center	1–3
5	June 21	Detroit	L 57–70	Penny Moore (18)	Alessandra Santos de Oliveira (11)	Nikki McCray (3)	MCI Center	1–4
6	June 25	@ Detroit	L 71–79	Nikki McCray (23)	Murriel Page (10)	McCray; Moore; Page (4)	The Palace of Auburn Hills	1–5
7	June 28	Phoenix	L 69–86	Murriel Page (18)	Murriel Page (9)	Nikki McCray (5)	MCI Center	1–6
8	June 29	@ Houston	L 48–73	Alessandra Santos de Oliveira (16)	Murriel Page (7)	Adrienne Shuler (4)	Compaq Center	1–7

July: 1–11 (Home: 0–6; Road: 1–5)

Game	Date	Team	Score	High points	High rebounds	High assists	Location Attendance	Record
9	July 1	Cleveland	L 80–92	Nikki McCray (19)	Alessandra Santos de Oliveira (9)	Moore; Williams (4)	MCI Center	1–8
10	July 3	@ New York	L 60–76	Nikki McCray (16)	Murriel Page (7)	Keri Chaconas (5)	Madison Square Garden	1–9
11	July 5	New York	L 61–62 (OT)	Nikki McCray (15)	Murriel Page (14)	Rita Williams (4)	MCI Center	1–10
12	July 8	@ Cleveland	L 65–77	Nikki McCray (14)	Nikki McCray (7)	Penny Moore (5)	Gund Arena	1–11
13	July 11	@ Detroit	W 78–53	Nikki McCray (21)	Alessandra Santos de Oliveira (14)	Adrienne Shuler (5)	The Palace of Auburn Hills	2–11
14	July 13	@ Houston	L 67–81	McCray; Santos de Oliveira (14)	Alessandra Santos de Oliveira (12)	Nikki McCray (4)	Compaq Center	2–12
15	July 17	@ Charlotte	L 56–86	Burge; Chaconas (10)	Penny Moore (8)	Chaconas; Shuler (5)	Charlotte Coliseum	2–13
16	July 19	Utah	L 88–99	Nikki McCray (26)	Murriel Page (7)	Burge; Chaconas; Shuler (2)	MCI Center	2–14
17	July 21	Charlotte	L 67–84	Penny Moore (17)	Penny Moore (11)	Penny Moore (5)	MCI Center	2–15
18	July 22	@ Detroit	L 61–76	Keri Chaconas (10)	Murriel Page (8)	Rita Williams (3)	The Palace of Auburn Hills	2–16
19	July 26	Sacramento	L 65–79	Nikki McCray (27)	Murriel Page (8)	McCray; Shuler (3)	MCI Center	2–17
20	July 29	Los Angeles	L 68–77	Nikki McCray (18)	Murriel Page (10)	Nikki McCray (4)	MCI Center	2–18

August: 1–9 (Home: 1–4; Road: 0–5)

Game	Date	Team	Score	High points	High rebounds	High assists	Location Attendance	Record
21	August 1	New York	L 53–67	Keri Chaconas (11)	McCray; Page (7)	Heidi Burge (3)	MCI Center	2–19
22	August 3	@ Los Angeles	L 72–86	Penny Moore (18)	Burge; Page; Williams (6)	Burge; Moore (4)	Great Western Forum	2–20
23	August 4	@ Phoenix	L 59–88	Heidi Burge (19)	Nikki McCray (9)	Nikki McCray (5)	America West Arena	2–21
24	August 7	@ Sacramento	L 55–76	Nikki McCray (11)	McCray; Page (6)	Rita Williams (4)	ARCO Arena	2–22
25	August 9	Los Angeles	W 76–74	Nikki McCray (21)	Murriel Page (8)	Adrienne Shuler (5)	MCI Center	3–22
26	August 12	Cleveland	L 55–75	Nikki McCray (19)	Deborah Carter (8)	Keri Chaconas (4)	MCI Center	3–23
27	August 13	@ New York	L 45–88	Nikki McCray (21)	Heidi Burge (6)	Nikki McCray (3)	Madison Square Garden	3–24
28	August 15	@ Cleveland	L 71–90	McCray; Page (19)	Murriel Page (8)	Rita Williams (8)	Gund Arena	3–25
29	August 17	Houston	L 65–110	Nikki McCray (20)	Deborah Carter (7)	McCray; Williams (3)	MCI Center	3–26
30	August 19	Charlotte	L 69–105	Nikki McCray (20)	Murriel Page (9)	Nikki McCray (9)	MCI Center	3–27

1998 season schedule

=== Season standings ===
Eastern Conference	W	L	PCT	Conf.	GB
Cleveland Rockers ^{x}	20	10	.667	12–4	–
Charlotte Sting ^{x}	18	12	.600	11–5	2.0
New York Liberty ^{o}	18	12	.600	8–8	2.0
Detroit Shock ^{o}	17	13	.567	8–8	3.0
Washington Mystics ^{o}	3	27	.100	1–15	17.0

== Statistics ==
Legend
GP	Games played	GS	Games started	MPG	Minutes per game	RPG	Rebounds per game
APG	Assists per game	SPG	Steals per game	BPG	Blocks per game	PPG	Points per game
FG%	Field-goal percentage	3P%	3-point field-goal percentage	FT%	Free-throw percentage	TO	Turnovers per game
PF	Fouls per game		Team leader		League leader

=== Regular season ===
Player	GP	GS	MPG	FG%	3P%	FT%	RPG	APG	SPG	BPG	PPG
Nikki McCray	29	28	33.4	.419	.319	.748	2.9	3.1	1.5	0.1	17.7
Murriel Page	30	30	31.8	.479	.000	.631	6.9	1.3	0.6	0.4	8.3
Alessandro Santos de Oliveira	16	12	30.1	.516	N/A	.463	8.1	0.1	0.8	0.4	11.0
Penny Moore	29	26	26.1	.344	.207	.717	3.7	1.6	1.5	0.7	8.2
Rita Williams	30	18	23.7	.320	.214	.633	2.2	2.3	2.1	0.1	4.4
Heidi Burge	30	15	16.7	.509	.286	.597	3.3	0.9	0.5	0.5	6.7
Deborah Carter	29	6	15.0	.271	.245	.808	2.2	0.8	0.6	0.1	3.8
Adrienne Shuler	25	12	14.5	.369	.342	.824	2.1	1.9	0.9	0.1	3.6
Keri Chaconas	30	1	13.2	.297	.286	.788	0.8	1.3	0.4	0.0	4.8
La'Shawn Brown	22	2	12.4	.342	N/A	.515	2.5	0.3	0.5	0.9	2.0
Tammy Jackson	2	0	7.0	.667	N/A	.000	2.0	0.0	0.0	0.0	2.0
Margo Graham	9	0	5.4	.421	N/A	.500	1.4	0.1	0.1	0.1	2.0
Angela Jackson	7	0	5.1	.500	N/A	.667	0.6	0.0	0.1	0.3	1.4
Leila Sobral	15	0	4.7	.250	.273	.667	0.7	0.4	0.3	0.1	1.7
Leslie Johnson	6	0	2.5	.500	N/A	N/A	0.2	0.2	0.0	0.0	0.3

^{‡}Waived/Released during the season
^{†}Traded during the season
^{≠}Acquired during the season
