= 1999 Washington Mystics season =

- Head coach: Nancy Darsch
- Arena: MCI Center

Results
- Record: 12–20 (.375)
- Place: 5th (Eastern)
- Playoff finish: Did not qualify

The 1999 WNBA season was the second for the Washington Mystics. In the 1999 WNBA draft, Chamique Holdsclaw was selected by the Washington Mystics 1st overall. In her first season, she was named the Rookie of the Year and was a starter in the inaugural WNBA All-Star Game. She averaged 16.9 points and 7.9 rebounds per game in her first season.

== Transactions ==
=== WNBA draft ===
Round	Pick	Player	Nationality	School/Team/Country
1	1	Chamique Holdsclaw	United States	Tennessee
2	13	Shalonda Enis	United States	Seattle Reign
3	25	Andrea Nagy	Hungary	Philadelphia Rage
4	37	Jenny Whittle	Australia	Perth Breakers (Australia)

=== Transactions ===
Date	Transaction
February 18, 1999	Hired Nancy Darsch as Head Coach
May 4, 1999	Drafted Chamique Holdsclaw, Shalonda Enis, Andrea Nagy and Jenny Whittle in the 1999 WNBA draft
May 6, 1999	Waived Adrienne Shuler, Keri Chaconas and Margo Graham
July 1, 1999	Waived Jenny Whittle
July 1, 1999	Signed Valerie Still
July 11, 1999	Traded Alessandra Santos de Oliveira to the Houston Comets in exchange for Nyree Roberts
December 15, 1999	Traded Monica Maxwell and a 2000 4th Round Pick to the Indiana Fever in exchange for agreement to select Nyree Roberts in the WNBA expansion draft

== Roster ==
1999 Washington Mystics roster
Players
Coaches

Pos.	No.	Nat.	Name	Height	Weight	DOB	From	Yrs
G	32	(United States)	Aldridge, Markita	5' 11" (1.8m)		1973-09-15	Charlotte	R
F/C	3	(United States)	Enis, Shalonda	6' 1" (1.85m)	185 lb (84kg)	1974-12-03	Alabama	R
F	23	(United States)	Holdsclaw, Chamique	6' 2" (1.88m)	172 lb (78kg)	1977-08-09	Tennessee	R
F	21	(United States)	Maxwell, Monica	5' 9" (1.75m)	162 lb (73kg)	1976-12-21	Louisiana Tech	R
G	15	(United States)	McCray, Nikki	5' 11" (1.8m)	158 lb (72kg)	1971-12-17	Tennessee	1
F	24	(United States)	Moore, Penny	6' 0" (1.83m)		1969-01-25	Long Beach State	2
G	11	(Hungarian People's Republic)	Nagy, Andrea	5' 7" (1.7m)	147 lb (67kg)	1971-11-16	FIU	R
F/C	44	(United States)	Owen, Heather	6' 5" (1.96m)	212 lb (96kg)	1976-05-06	Stanford	R
F	10	(United States)	Page, Murriel	6' 2" (1.88m)	160 lb (73kg)	1975-09-18	Florida	1
C	0	(United States)	Roberts, Nyree	6' 3" (1.91m)	209 lb (95kg)	1976-03-10	Old Dominion	1
C	11	(Brazil)	Santos de Oliveira, Alessandra	6' 5" (1.96m)	181 lb (82kg)	1973-12-02		1
F	12	(United States)	Still, Valerie	6' 1" (1.85m)	155 lb (70kg)	1961-05-14	Kentucky	R
C	32	(Australia)	Whittle, Jenny	6' 5" (1.96m)		1973-11-05		R
G	23	(United States)	Williams, Rita	5' 6" (1.68m)	135 lb (61kg)	1976-01-14	Connecticut	1

Head coach
(United States) Nancy Darsch (Tennessee)
Assistant coaches
(United States) Melissa McFerrin
(United States) Jenny Boucek

Legend

- (C) Team captain
- (DP) Unsigned draft pick
- (FA) Free agent
- (S) Suspended
- Injured

== Schedule ==
=== Regular season ===
1999 game log
Total: 12–20 (Home: 6–10; Road: 6–10)
June: 2–7 (Home: 0–4; Road: 2–3)

Game	Date	Team	Score	High points	High rebounds	High assists	Location Attendance	Record
1	June 10	Charlotte	L 73–83	Nikki McCray (22)	Murriel Page (9)	Andrea Nagy (12)	MCI Center	0–1
2	June 12	@ Houston	L 63–88	Shalonda Enis (13)	Chamique Holdsclaw (13)	Enis; Nagy (3)	Compaq Center	0–2
3	June 14	@ New York	W 83–61	Nikki McCray (24)	Chamique Holdsclaw (9)	Andrea Nagy (6)	Madison Square Garden	1–2
4	June 18	Detroit	L 69–76	Nikki McCray (19)	Shalonda Enis (15)	Andrea Nagy (7)	MCI Center	1–3
5	June 19	@ Orlando	L 68–73	Chamique Holdsclaw (23)	Murriel Page (11)	Andrea Nagy (5)	TD Waterhouse Centre	1–4
6	June 22	Phoenix	L 76–79	Nikki McCray (24)	Enis; Holdsclaw (7)	Andrea Nagy (8)	MCI Center	1–5
7	June 25	Houston	L 69–72	Chamique Holdsclaw (24)	Murriel Page (7)	Andrea Nagy (9)	MCI Center	1–6
8	June 26	@ Cleveland	L 65–76	Nikki McCray (25)	Chamique Holdsclaw (10)	McCray; Nagy (2)	Gund Arena	1–7
9	June 30	@ Charlotte	W 68–63	Chamique Holdsclaw (21)	Chamique Holdsclaw (14)	Chamique Holdsclaw (4)	Charlotte Coliseum	2–7

July: 4–10 (Home: 2–5; Road: 2–5)

Game	Date	Team	Score	High points	High rebounds	High assists	Location Attendance	Record
10	July 2	Sacramento	L 74–79	Chamique Holdsclaw (22)	Chamique Holdsclaw (9)	Chamique Holdsclaw (7)	MCI Center	2–8
11	July 6	New York	W 71–63	Nikki McCray (16)	Murriel Page (8)	Nikki McCray (9)	MCI Center	3–8
12	July 8	Utah	L 65–81	Chamique Holdsclaw (23)	Murriel Page (6)	Enis; Nagy (5)	MCI Center	3–9
13	July 10	@ Detroit	W 83–78 (2OT)	Chamique Holdsclaw (20)	Chamique Holdsclaw (16)	Andrea Nagy (9)	The Palace of Auburn Hills	4–9
14	July 12	Charlotte	W 74–71	Nikki McCray (26)	Murriel Page (15)	Holdsclaw; Nagy (5)	MCI Center	5–9
15	July 16	Detroit	L 68–78	McCray; Page (18)	Murriel Page (10)	Markita Aldridge (5)	MCI Center	5–10
16	July 17	@ Charlotte	L 56–63	Shalonda Enis (18)	Enis; Holdsclaw (6)	Nikki McCray (9)	Charlotte Coliseum	5–11
17	July 19	Orlando	L 52–77	Chamique Holdsclaw (9)	Holdsclaw; Page (9)	Holdsclaw; Maxwell; McCray; Nagy; Williams (1)	MCI Center	5–12
18	July 21	Cleveland	L 68–85	Chamique Holdsclaw (23)	Shalonda Enis (6)	Aldridge; Holdsclaw; Nagy (2)	MCI Center	5–13
19	July 23	@ Minnesota	W 60–55	Nikki McCray (19)	Enis; Holdsclaw (7)	Nikki McCray (4)	Target Center	6–13
20	July 25	@ Phoenix	L 59–72	Nikki McCray (18)	Chamique Holdsclaw (7)	Holdsclaw; Nagy (3)	America West Arena	6–14
21	July 26	@ Utah	L 61–73	Nikki McCray (19)	Chamique Holdsclaw (9)	Nikki McCray (5)	Delta Center	6–15
22	July 29	@ Sacramento	L 54–70	Nikki McCray (16)	Shalonda Enis (8)	Andrea Nagy (6)	ARCO Arena	6–16
23	July 31	@ Los Angeles	L 64–81	Nikki McCray (19)	Murriel Page (10)	Holdsclaw; Nagy (3)	Great Western Forum	6–17

August: 6–3 (Home: 4–1; Road: 2–2)

Game	Date	Team	Score	High points	High rebounds	High assists	Location Attendance	Record
24	August 2	@ Detroit	W 75–70	Chamique Holdsclaw (23)	Holdsclaw; Page (7)	Andrea Nagy (7)	The Palace of Auburn Hills	7–17
25	August 5	Orlando	W 72–68	Holdsclaw; McCray (24)	Chamique Holdsclaw (9)	Andrea Nagy (7)	MCI Center	8–17
26	August 7	@ Cleveland	W 63–62	Nikki McCray (25)	Chamique Holdsclaw (6)	Andrea Nagy (11)	Gund Arena	9–17
27	August 8	Cleveland	W 80–45	Nikki McCray (20)	Murriel Page (7)	Holdsclaw; McCray; Nagy (4)	MCI Center	10–17
28	August 11	New York	W 59–56 (OT)	Nikki McCray (20)	Chamique Holdsclaw (14)	Enis; McCray; Nagy; Page; Williams (2)	MCI Center	11–17
29	August 14	Los Angeles	W 55–53	Nikki McCray (20)	Chamique Holdsclaw (13)	Nikki McCray (5)	MCI Center	12–17
30	August 15	@ Orlando	L 54–81	Nikki McCray (13)	Enis; Roberts; McCray (5)	Aldridge; McCray (4)	TD Waterhouse Centre	12–18
31	August 17	@ New York	L 54–66	Nikki McCray (12)	Heather Owen (5)	Enis; Holdsclaw; Page (2)	Madison Square Garden	12–19
32	August 21	Minnesota	L 45–48	Nikki McCray (19)	Murriel Page (10)	Andrea Nagy (5)	MCI Center	12–20

1999 season schedule

=== Season standings ===
Eastern Conference	W	L	PCT	Conf.	GB
New York Liberty ^{x}	18	14	.563	12–8	–
Detroit Shock ^{x}	15	17	.469	12–8	3.0
Charlotte Sting ^{x}	15	17	.469	12–8	3.0
Orlando Miracle ^{o}	15	17	.469	9–11	3.0
Washington Mystics ^{o}	12	20	.375	10–10	6.0
Cleveland Rockers ^{o}	7	25	.219	5–15	11.0

== Statistics ==
Legend
GP	Games played	GS	Games started	MPG	Minutes per game	RPG	Rebounds per game
APG	Assists per game	SPG	Steals per game	BPG	Blocks per game	PPG	Points per game
FG%	Field-goal percentage	3P%	3-point field-goal percentage	FT%	Free-throw percentage	TO	Turnovers per game
PF	Fouls per game		Team leader		League leader

=== Regular season ===
Player	GP	GS	MPG	FG%	3P%	FT%	RPG	APG	SPG	BPG	PPG
Chamique Holdsclaw	31	30	34.2	.437	.172	.773	7.9	2.4	1.2	0.9	16.9
Nikki McCray	32	32	32.6	.424	.301	.806	2.7	2.4	1.1	0.0	17.5
Andrea Nagy	32	32	29.6	.409	.273	.763	2.4	4.6	1.0	0.1	5.1
Shalonda Enis	29	26	29.1	.364	.275	.684	5.4	1.6	0.8	0.1	7.4
Murriel Page	32	26	28.6	.574	N/A	.683	6.7	0.9	0.8	0.9	8.8
Alessandro Santos de Oliveira	13	6	16.6	.564	N/A	.318	3.2	0.1	0.1	0.2	3.9
Heather Owen	17	0	13.8	.400	N/A	.696	2.2	0.4	0.1	0.2	2.1
Valerie Still	23	6	12.3	.245	.000	.368	1.9	0.3	0.2	0.2	1.3
Markita Aldridge	31	2	12.2	.309	.150	.606	1,2	1.1	0.5	0.2	2.6
Rita Williams	31	0	10.1	.500	.559	.639	1.2	1.0	0.7	0.0	3.4
Nyree Roberts	8	0	7.7	.600	N/A	.571	1.3	0.1	0.6	0.1	2.0
Monica Maxwell	20	0	7.1	.220	.212	.556	1.1	0.5	0.3	0.1	1.7
Jenny Whittle	3	0	6.0	.000	N/A	N/A	1.0	0.0	0.3	0.3	0.0
Penny Moore	4	0	4.8	.333	N/A	N/A	0.73	0.0	0.0	0.3	0.5

^{‡}Waived/Released during the season
^{†}Traded during the season
^{≠}Acquired during the season

- Chamique Holdsclaw ranked sixth in the WNBA in Free Throws, 116
- Nikki McCray, ranked fifth in the WNBA in Free Throws, 129

== Awards and honors ==
- Chamique Holdsclaw, WNBA Rookie of the Year Award
- Chamique Holdsclaw, Forward, All-WNBA Second Team
- Murriel Page, WNBA Peak Performer
