= Jim Lewis (basketball) =

American basketball coach

Jim Lewis (born December 15, 1946) is a former collegiate and WNBA basketball coach. After completing assistant coaching positions during the 1970s, Lewis was the head coach of the South Lakes High School boys' basketball team in the early 1980s. In collegiate basketball, Lewis obtained 201 wins and 107 losses as the George Mason Patriots women's basketball head coach from 1984 to 1997. He then went to the WNBA as the first head coach of the Washington Mystics for the 1998 season. Between the 2000s and 2010s, Lewis held assistant coaching positions with the Minnesota Lynx, Indiana Fever and Los Angeles Sparks. During this time period, Lewis was the head coach for the Fordham Rams women's basketball team, T.C. Williams High School girls basketball team, and Georgetown Hoyas women's basketball team.

== Early life and education ==
Lewis was born on December 15, 1946, in Alexandria, Virginia. During the 1960s, Lewis lived in Parker-Gray before he left for Groveton, Virginia. At both of these locations, Lewis was a boys basketball player. Outside of basketball, he was on a boys football team and had a leg fracture.

After joining West Virginia University in 1964, he was their "first [African American] basketball player to sign an athletic grant-in-aid". During December 1964, Lewis had surgery to his leg while playing basketball for West Virginia. By early 1965, he had surgeries to his knees and stopped playing basketball. Due to his knee surgeries, Lewis did not play for West Virginia during the 1965-1966 basketball season. By December 1966, Lewis had returned to the roster for West Virginia.

In January 1967, Lewis had a foot fracture and was scheduled to miss over a month of games for West Virginia. After returning in March 1967, Lewis remained with West Virginia until 1968. During these two years, Lewis had a combined total of 106 rebounds and 125 points after appearing in 36 games. Outside of basketball, Lewis studied journalism at West Virginia before leaving for the University of Detroit as a graduate student. For additional education, Lewis went to Tennessee State University for a physical education program.

== Career ==
From 1969 to 1971, Lewis was an assistant coach for one year each at Tennessee State and Gannon College. He continued his assistant coaching tenure in 1971 with five-year positions at Duke University and Tulane University. In 1981, Lewis was hired by South Lakes High School as a gym teacher before he became their head coach of the boys' basketball team. At South Lakes, Lewis had 59 wins and 15 losses before he left his coaching position in 1984.

In 1984, Lewis became the head coach of the George Mason Patriots women's basketball team. While with George Mason, Lewis was an assistant coach for USA Basketball in the 1990s. With USA Basketball, Lewis was an assistant women's basketball coach during the 1994 R. William Jones Cup and the 1995 World University Games. At George Mason, Lewis had 201 wins and 177 losses before he was replaced by Debbie Taneyhill during the 1997 season. That year, Lewis was hired as the inaugural head coach of the Washington Mystics. With the WNBA team, Lewis had 2 wins and 16 losses during the 1998 season.

After leaving the Mystics in 1998 to become a basketball commentator, Lewis returned to head coaching in 2000 with the Fordham Rams women's basketball team. With Fordham, Lewis had 56 wins and 118 losses between 2000 and 2006. In 2006, Lewis returned to the WNBA as an assistant coach for the Minnesota Lynx. As the T.C. Williams High School girls basketball coach from 2007 to 2008, Lewis obtained 22 wins and 1 loss before he resumed his WNBA experience with the Indiana Fever in 2008. From 2008 to 2010, Lewis worked with the Fever as a scout and assistant coach before becoming an assistant coach for the Georgia Tech Yellow Jackets women's basketball team in 2010.

Lewis stayed with Georgia Tech for a year before being hired by the Los Angeles Sparks in 2012 as an assistant coach. During his time with the Sparks, Lewis also scouted for the team before being named the interim head coach of the Georgetown Hoyas women's basketball team in October 2013. He remained with Georgetown until April 2014. With the Hoyas, Lewis had 11 wins and 21 losses.

== Head coaching record ==
Legend
Regular season	G	Games coached	W	Games won	L	Games lost	W–L %	Win–loss %
Playoffs	PG	Playoff games	PW	Playoff wins	PL	Playoff losses	PW–L %	Playoff win–loss %

=== WNBA ===
Team	Year	G	W	L	W–L%	Finish	PG	PW	PL	PW–L%	Result
Washington	1998	18	2	16	.111	(replaced)	—	—	—	—	—

== Honors ==
From the Southern Conference, Lewis received the SoCon Alfred White Trailblazer Recognition in 2021.
