= Nikki McCray-Penson =

American basketball player and coach (1971–2023)

Personal information
- Born: December 17, 1971 Collierville, Tennessee, U.S.
- Died: July 7, 2023 (aged 51)
- Listed height: 5 ft 11 in (1.80 m)
- Listed weight: 158 lb (72 kg)

Career information
- High school: Collierville (Collierville, Tennessee)
- College: Tennessee (1991–1995)
- Playing career: 1996–2006
- Position: Point guard
- Number: 15
- Coaching career: 2006–2023

Career history

Playing
- 1996–1997: Columbus Quest
- 1998–2001: Washington Mystics
- 2002–2003: Indiana Fever
- 2004: Phoenix Mercury
- 2005: San Antonio Stars
- 2006: Chicago Sky

Coaching
- 2006–2008: Western Kentucky (assistant)
- 2008–2017: South Carolina (assistant)
- 2017–2020: Old Dominion
- 2020–2021: Mississippi State
- 2022–2023: Rutgers (assistant)

Career highlights
- As coach: Conference USA Coach of the Year (2020); As player: 3× WNBA All-Star (1999–2001); First-team All-American – AP (1995); ABL MVP (1997); 2× Kodak All-American (1994, 1995); 2× All-American – USBWA (1994, 1995); 2× SEC Player of the Year (1994, 1995); 2× First-team All-SEC (1994, 1995); 2× Kodak All-American (1994, 1995); Class AAA Tennessee Miss Basketball (1990)
- Stats at WNBA.com
- Stats at Basketball Reference
- Women's Basketball Hall of Fame
Medals
Women's basketball
Representing United States
Olympic Games
Gold medal – first place	1996 Atlanta	Team competition
Gold medal – first place	2000 Sydney	Team competition
World Championship
Gold medal – first place	1998 Germany	Team competition

Nikki Kesangane McCray-Penson (née McCray; December 17, 1971 – July 7, 2023) was an American basketball player and coach. She was the head coach of the Mississippi State Bulldogs women's basketball team from 2020 to 2021 and a professional basketball player from 1996 to 2006. She played in the Women's National Basketball Association (WNBA) for eight seasons. In 2008 after leaving the WNBA, McCray joined the coaching staff as an assistant coach for the South Carolina Gamecocks. McCray-Penson was inducted into the Women's Basketball Hall of Fame in 2012. She was inducted into the Naismith Basketball Hall of Fame in 2026 as a member of the 1996 United States women's Olympic basketball team.

== Playing career ==
A 5-foot-11-inch (1.80 m) guard from the University of Tennessee, McCray was a star in the now-defunct American Basketball League. While playing in the American Basketball League, she was named Most Valuable Player for the 1996–97 season.

McCray also played basketball at the international level. She won gold medals at the 1996 and 2000 Summer Olympics, and she participated on America's 1998 FIBA World Championship team. She made a name for herself in women's basketball as a world class defender by shutting down a number of the world's best players.

In 2000, she was named a member of the President's Fitness Council, and was also chosen for the 2000 USA Olympic basketball team.

== WNBA ==
=== Washington Mystics ===
McCray was selected as part of the initial player allocation by the Washington Mystics on January 27, 1998. Her debut game was played on June 11, 1998, in a 57–83 loss to the Charlotte Sting where she recorded 19 points and 6 assists. McCray would be a starting Guard for the Mystics in her first four seasons in the WNBA. She played in 125 games for the Mystics in that four seasons and started in 124 of them, with averages of 15.4 points, 2.4 assists, 1.2 steals in 31.1 minutes per game.

She was named to three WNBA All-Star teams (in 1999, 2000, and 2001). The Mystics missed the playoffs in 1998, 1999 and 2001 but made it in 2000 with a losing record of 14–18 (this was possible due to the Mystics being 4th in the Eastern Conference and the top 4 teams of each conference made the postseason). However, the team's playoff run was short lived as they were eliminated in the first round by the New York Liberty in two games. In the second game of that playoff series, McCray was held scoreless throughout her entire 30 minutes on the floor and shot 0–3 FG.

=== Indiana Fever ===
On December 5, 2001, McCray was traded to the Indiana Fever along with a 2002 2nd-round pick and a 2002 4th-round pick in exchange for Angie Braziel, a 2002 1st-round pick and a 2002 3rd-round pick. Her position as a starting Guard would transfer to her new team, as she started in 64 of the 66 games for Indiana in her two seasons with them. During her first season with the team (2002), the Fever made it to the playoffs but McCrary would once again be eliminated in the first round by the Liberty (2–1). Although she played in the WNBA for four more seasons, McCray would not reach the playoffs after the 2002 season. Her second season with the Fever (although she was still a starter) saw her minutes per game drop drastically to only 21.6 minutes per game.

=== Phoenix Mercury ===
After the 2003 season, McCray would then play for three different teams in three years. On April 27, 2004, she was signed to the Phoenix Mercury as a free agent. This was McCray's first season as a reserve player and she only started in 9 of her 27 games played for Phoenix. She averaged her highest FG % in a season at 44.8%, but she also averaged the lowest points per game of her career at that point at only 2.6 ppg. The Mercury finished 17–17 and missed the playoffs.

=== San Antonio Silver Stars ===
On April 19, 2005, she signed with the San Antonio Silver Stars. On the Silver Stars, McCray averaged her lowest FG% in a season and an even lower points per game than the prior season (24.2% FG and 1.7 ppg). The Silver Stars would finish the 2005 season with their lowest record in franchise history at 7–27 (a record they would later tie in the 2016 season and it still stands as their lowest record ever).

=== Chicago Sky ===
McCray signed with the Chicago Sky on April 21, 2006. Coincidentally, the Sky would also have their worst season in franchise history, as they finished the 2006 season at 5-29. McCray only played in the team's first 11 games of the season (averaging 2 ppg) and missed the final 23 games. In the 11 games that McCray played, the Sky held a 1–10 record.

The 11th game that McCray played during the 2006 season ended up being her final WNBA game ever. That game was played on June 21, 2006, and the Sky were defeated by the Fever 55–77 with McCray recording 1 steal and 2 rebounds.

== Coaching career ==
McCray was an assistant coach at University of South Carolina. She made a new home for herself at the University of South Carolina with a former teammate as head coach, Dawn Staley. Staley said about McCray: "Nikki is hungry for success, and that comes from playing at Tennessee where the coach never settles for anything less than being number one at whatever she's doing. That mentality is instilled in Nikki, and I want people around me like that. She is energetic, confident and engaging – all qualities that you need when you're coaching and recruiting. We spent two Olympic Games together and have shared being successful in the very best arena there is to test yourself." She resigned as head coach at Mississippi State in October 2021 citing health reasons.

== Other work ==
In addition to her career on the court, McCray also created a name for herself in the realm of community service. In the year 2000 Nikki McCray was hand-picked by President Bill Clinton to be made a member of the President's Council on Physical Fitness and Sports.

In 1999 The Library of Congress selected McCray to be the keynote speaker for the Women's History Month Address. "We are pleased to have Ms. McCray with us to kick-off our month long celebration of women's history," said Federal Women's Program Manager Jean Parker. "As an employee of the first women's professional basketball team in the nation's capital and through her community service, Ms. McCray is a wonderful role model for young people."

== Personal life and death ==
McCray was diagnosed with breast cancer in 2013 while on the staff at South Carolina. She went into remission later that year.

McCray died on July 7, 2023, while serving as an assistant coach for Rutgers. She was 51.

== Career statistics ==
Legend
GP	Games played	GS	Games started	MPG	Minutes per game	RPG	Rebounds per game
APG	Assists per game	SPG	Steals per game	BPG	Blocks per game	PPG	Points per game
TO	Turnovers per game	FG%	Field-goal percentage	3P%	3-point field-goal percentage	FT%	Free-throw percentage
**Bold**	Career best	°	League leader

=== WNBA career statistics ===
==== Regular season ====
Year	Team	GP	GS	MPG	FG%	3P%	FT%	RPG	APG	SPG	BPG	TO	PPG
1998	Washington	29	28	**33.4**	41.9	31.9	74.8	2.9	**3.1**	**1.5**	0.1	4.3	**17.7**
1999	Washington	32	32	32.6	42.4	30.1	80.6	2.7	2.4	1.1	0.0	3.3	17.5
2000	Washington	32	32	32.7	43.4	33.1	76.9	1.8	2.7	1.4	**0.2**	2.8	15.5
2001	Washington	32	32	25.9	41.0	23.2	71.1	1.8	1.5	0.8	0.0	2.3	11.0
2002	Indiana	32	32	33.1	41.5	31.8	81.6	**3.0**	2.2	0.9	0.1	2.6	11.5
2003	Indiana	**34**	32	21.6	37.7	21.9	**83.3**	1.5	1.4	1.1	0.1	1.3	3.9
2004	Phoenix	27	9	13.7	**44.8**	**45.5**	57.1	1.1	0.5	0.3	0.0	**0.7**	2.6
2005	San Antonio	23	5	13.1	24.2	5.0	63.6	0.9	0.7	0.5	0.0	0.8	1.7
2006	Chicago	11	2	7.5	36.4	20.0	71.4	0.5	0.5	0.6	0.1	0.9	2.0
Career	9 years, 5 teams	252	204	25.5	41.4	29.1	76.7	1.9	1.8	0.9	0.1	2.3	10.1

==== Playoffs ====
Year	Team	GP	GS	MPG	FG%	3P%	FT%	RPG	APG	SPG	BPG	TO	PPG
2000	Washington	2	2	**35.0**	**43.8**	14.3	46.9	**3.0**	**6.5**	**0.5**	0.0	5.0	7.5
2002	Indiana	**3**	**3**	33.0	37.0	**16.7**	**60.0**	1.3	3.7	0.3	0.0	**1.7**	**8.0**
Career	2 years, 2 teams	5	5	33.8	39.5	15.4	60.0	2.0	4.8	0.4	0.0	3.0	7.8

=== College career statistics ===
Legend
GP	Games played	GS	Games started	MPG	Minutes per game
FG%	Field goal percentage	3P%	3-point field goal percentage	FT%	Free throw percentage
RPG	Rebounds per game	APG	Assists per game	SPG	Steals per game
BPG	Blocks per game	PPG	Points per game	**Bold**	Career high

Year	Team	GP	Points	FG%	3P%	FT%	RPG	APG	SPG	BPG	PPG
1991–92	Tennessee	31	215	50.0%	**20.0%**	**73.6%**	3.7	0.8	1.9	0.0	6.9
1992–93	Tennessee	32	349	46.5%	0%	72.2%	4.5	1.9	2.7	**0.1**	10.9
1993–94	Tennessee	**33**	**537**	**50.6%**	0%	70.3%	**7.0**	2.5	**2.5**	0.1	**16.3**
1994–95	Tennessee	31	471	49.2%	13.3%	68.0%	5.9	**2.6**	2.0	0.1	15.2
Career		127	1572	49.2%	16.0%	70.5%	5.3	2.0	2.3	0.1	12.4

== Head coaching record ==
Record table
Season	Team	Overall	Conference	Standing	Postseason
Old Dominion Lady Monarchs (Conference USA) (2017–2020)
2017–18	Old Dominion	8–23	6–10	12th	
2018–19	Old Dominion	21–10	10–6	5th	WNIT First Round
2019–20	Old Dominion	24–6	14–4	2nd	Postseason not held
Old Dominion:		53–39 (.576)	30–20 (.600)		
Mississippi State Bulldogs (Southeastern Conference) (2020–2021)
2020–21	Mississippi State	10–9	5–7	9th	
Mississippi State:		10–9 (.526)	5–7 (.417)		
Total:		63–48 (.568)			
National champion Postseason invitational champion Conference regular season champion Conference regular season and conference tournament champion Division regular season champion Division regular season and conference tournament champion Conference tournament champion
