= Angela Jackson (basketball) =

Collegiate basketball coach

Angela Jackson is an American collegiate women's basketball coach. She coached the Chicago State University women's basketball team, the Cougars, for 15 years. Jackson led them to win the 2010–2011 Great West Conference Championships and to the Women's Basketball Invitational Final Four, for which she was named Coach of the Year. Among the coaches of Chicago State athletic teams, she has the strongest career record, 123 wins. She coached several 1,000 point scorers, including six players who went on to professional contracts.

== College ==
A Detroit native, Jackson started college playing basketball for Odessa College. In 1986 and 1987 she was an All-Conference Selections in the Western Junior College Athletic Conference's Women's Basketball category. In her junior year she transferred from Odessa Community College to Old Dominion University. She played guard. She graduated in 1991 with a degree in Health and Physical Education.

== Career ==
Starting as an assistant coach at Wayne State University, Jackson went on to be head coach at Saginaw Valley State. From there she became assistant coach at Michigan State University. Then she became the associate head coach at the University of Michigan from 2001 to 2003. From 2003 to 2018, Jackson coached at Chicago State.

In 2010–2011, her team won their conference championships and also beat out Eastern Illinois and Cleveland State to earn a place in the WBI Final Four. While there, 91 percent of her players graduated, since Jackson believes that education is still important for college athletes. Although six of her players signed professional contracts, she still wants them to complete their degree. Jackson argues that since female athletes are underpaid compared to their male counterparts, even those who go pro need to prepare for other careers, as well.

Several of her players went on to sign professional contracts, including Tressa Beckel, Jasmin Dixon, Zondranika Williams, and Kafayat Davies.

In 2017–18, Chicago State's women's basketball team set a Division I record for the most consecutive losses. Jackson was fired in 2018 for underperformance, although the New York Times reported that the failing finances of Chicago State made it too difficult for her to attract and retain players.
