= Murriel Page =

American basketball player and coach (born 1975)

Miami Hurricanes
- Title: Assistant coach
- League: ACC

Personal information
- Born: September 18, 1975 (age 51) Louin, Mississippi, U.S.
- Listed height: 6 ft 2 in (1.88 m)
- Listed weight: 160 lb (73 kg)

Career information
- High school: Bay Springs (Bay Springs, Mississippi)
- College: Florida (1994–1998)
- WNBA draft: 1998: 1st round, 3rd overall pick
- Drafted by: Washington Mystics
- Playing career: 1998–2009
- Position: Forward
- Number: 10, 00
- Coaching career: 2010–present

Career history

Playing
- 1998–2005: Washington Mystics
- 2006–2008: Los Angeles Sparks

Coaching
- 2010–2017: Florida (assistant)
- 2018–2020: Central Michigan (assistant)
- 2020–2022: Georgia Tech (assistant)
- 2022–2024: Mississippi State (assistant)
- 2024–present: Miami (FL) (assistant)

Career highlights
- Second-team All-American – AP (1998); All-American – USBWA (1998); Kodak All-American (1998); 2× First-team All-SEC (1997, 1998); SEC All-Freshman Team (1995)

Career WNBA statistics
- Points: 2,154 (6.1 ppg)
- Rebounds: 1,603 (4.5 rpg)
- Assists: 412 (1.2 apg)
- Stats at Basketball Reference
Medals
Women's basketball
Representing the United States
Jones Cup
Silver medal – second place	1997 Taipei, Taiwan	Team competition

LaMurriel Page (born September 18, 1975) is an American former college and professional basketball player who was a forward and center in the Women's National Basketball Association (WNBA) for eleven seasons. Page played college basketball for the University of Florida, and was drafted in the first round of the 1998 WNBA draft. She played professionally for the Washington Mystics and the Los Angeles Sparks of the WNBA. Currently, she is an assistant women's basketball coach at Miami Hurricanes.

== Early years ==
Murriel Page was born in Louin, Mississippi in 1975. She attended Bay Springs High School in Bay Springs, Mississippi, where she led her Bay Springs high school basketball team to two state championships.

== College career ==
Page accepted an athletic scholarship to attend the University of Florida in Gainesville, Florida, where she played for coach Carol Ross's Florida Gators women's basketball team. At the end of her Gators career, Page was ranked second all-time in points (1,915), rebounds (1,251), field goal percentage (.550), and free throws made (334). She graduated from the University of Florida with her bachelor's degree in 1998, and was later inducted into the University of Florida Athletic Hall of Fame as a "Gator Great" in 2009.

=== Florida statistics ===
Legend
GP	Games played	GS	Games started	MPG	Minutes per game
FG%	Field goal percentage	3P%	3-point field goal percentage	FT%	Free throw percentage
RPG	Rebounds per game	APG	Assists per game	SPG	Steals per game
BPG	Blocks per game	PPG	Points per game	**Bold**	Career high

Year	Team	GP	Points	FG%	3P%	FT%	RPG	APG	SPG	BPG	PPG
1994–95	Florida	**33**	349	**61.4%**	0.0%	52.2%	7.2	0.9	0.6	0.3	10.6
1995–96	Florida	30	432	48.6%	0.0%	62.9%	9.0	1.6	1.2	0.5	14.4
1996–97	Florida	**33**	522	54.3%	0.0%	59.9%	10.3	1.6	0.9	0.5	15.8
1997–98	Florida	32	**612**	57.1%	**16.7%**	**67.3%**	**12.6**	**2.2**	**1.3**	**0.6**	**19.1**
TOTALS	Florida	128	1915	55.0%	16.7%	61.5%	9.8	1.6	1.0	0.1	15.0

== USA Basketball ==
Page competed with USA Basketball as a member of the 1997 Jones Cup Team that won the silver medal in Taipei. Several of the games were close, with the USA team winning four games by six points or fewer, including an overtime game in the semifinal match against Japan. The gold medal game against South Korea was also close, but the USA fell 76–71 to claim the silver medal for the event. Page was the leading scorer for the team, averaging 14.7 points per game.

== Professional career ==
Page was selected third overall in the first round of the 1998 WNBA draft by the Washington Mystics, where she played for eight seasons. In March 2006, Page was traded to the Los Angeles Sparks along with Temeka Johnson in exchange for Nikki Teasley. During the 2008–2009 WNBA off-season, she played in Spain with Mallorca. During the 2007–08 off-season she played with San Jose, also in Spain.

== College coach ==
Following her retirement from professional basketball, Page worked as an assistant coach for the Florida Gators women's basketball team under head coach Amanda Butler beginning with the 2010–11 season until 2016–17. Page then served as an assistant coach at Central Michigan from 2017 to 2020 before joining the Georgia Tech staff in July 2020. In 2022 she joined Sam Purcell's staff at Mississippi State.

== WNBA career statistics ==
Legend
GP	Games played	GS	Games started	MPG	Minutes per game	RPG	Rebounds per game
APG	Assists per game	SPG	Steals per game	BPG	Blocks per game	PPG	Points per game
TO	Turnovers per game	FG%	Field-goal percentage	3P%	3-point field-goal percentage	FT%	Free-throw percentage
**Bold**	Career best	°	League leader

=== Regular season ===
Year	Team	GP	GS	MPG	FG%	3P%	FT%	RPG	APG	SPG	BPG	TO	PPG
1998	Washington	30	30	31.8	.479	.000	.631	**6.9**	1.3	0.6	0.4	1.9	8.3
1999	Washington	32	26	28.6	.574°	.000	.683	6.7	0.9	0.8	0.9	1.5	8.8
2000	Washington	32	32	**32.7**	**.590**°	.000	.565	6.5	**2.0**	0.7	1.0	2.0	**9.8**
2001	Washington	32	32	30.9	.433	.235	.583	5.5	1.7	**0.9**	**1.1**	1.9	7.0
2002	Washington	32	15	23.4	.451	**.500**	.566	4.8	1.2	0.4	0.5	1.4	6.5
2003	Washington	**34**	**34**	25.0	.377	.417	.750	4.5	1.0	0.5	0.7	1.2	6.3
2004	Washington	33	19	24.5	.463	.000	.550	4.2	1.1	0.8	0.5	0.9	5.6
2005	Washington	**34**	4	17.3	.395	.273	**1.000**	2.4	0.7	0.4	0.3	0.7	3.2
2006	Los Angeles	**34**	4	20.3	.471	.000	.761	3.6	1.0	0.5	0.3	0.9	4.9
2007	Los Angeles	**34**	8	18.4	.418	.200	.792	3.3	1.3	0.4	0.3	0.7	4.8
2008	Los Angeles	27	1	9.0	.327	.250	.667	1.3	0.5	0.2	0.0	**0.4**	1.6
Career	11 years, 2 teams	354	205	23.9	.464	.259	.651	4.5	1.2	0.6	0.5	1.2	6.1

=== Playoffs ===
Year	Team	GP	GS	MPG	FG%	3P%	FT%	RPG	APG	SPG	BPG	TO	PPG
2000	Washington	2	2	**34.5**	.444	.000	.750	3.0	0.5	**1.0**	0.0	2.0	5.5
2002	Washington	**5**	0	22.6	**.630**	.000	**.933**	4.4	0.8	0.2	**0.8**	0.6	**9.6**
2004	Washington	3	**3**	30.0	.313	.000	.500	**4.7**	**1.3**	0.0	0.3	1.0	3.7
2006	Los Angeles	**5**	1	23.6	.310	**.500**	.818	4.6	0.6	0.6	0.4	0.4	5.6
2008	Los Angeles	**5**	0	3.0	.000	.000	.500	0.0	0.2	0.0	0.2	**0.0**	0.2
Career	5 years, 2 teams	20	6	20.3	.422	.500	.824	3.3	0.7	0.3	0.4	0.6	5.0

== See also ==
- List of Florida Gators in the WNBA
- List of University of Florida alumni
- List of University of Florida Athletic Hall of Fame members
