= Keri Chaconas =

American basketball player (born 1974)

Personal information
- Born: December 21, 1974 (age 51) Washington, DC, U.S.
- Listed height: 5 ft 9 in (1.75 m)

Career information
- High school: Annandale (Annandale, Virginia)
- College: George Mason (1992–1996)
- WNBA draft: 1998: undrafted
- Playing career: 1998–1998
- Position: Guard
- Number: 12

Career history
- 1998: Washington Mystics

Career highlights
- 2x First-team All-CAA (1995, 1996); All-Freshman CAA Team (1993)
- Stats at Basketball Reference

Keri Chaconas (born December 21, 1974) is an American former professional basketball player and coach who played one season in the WNBA for the Washington Mystics. She played college basketball at George Mason, where she was a three-time All-Coastal Athletic Association selection. She left George Mason as their all-time leading scorer.

== College career ==
Chaconas played college basketball at George Mason. She earned three all-Coastal Athletic Association CAA selections and ended her career with 1,747 points, the most in George Mason's history.

== Professional career ==
Chaconas played professionally in Sweden and briefly in Greece before joining the Washington Mystics for their inaugural season in 1998. She appeared in all 30 games but was waived after the season.

== Career statistics ==
Legend
GP	Games played	GS	Games started	MPG	Minutes per game	RPG	Rebounds per game
APG	Assists per game	SPG	Steals per game	BPG	Blocks per game	PPG	Points per game
TO	Turnovers per game	FG%	Field-goal percentage	3P%	3-point field-goal percentage	FT%	Free-throw percentage
**Bold**	Career best	°	League leader

=== WNBA ===
==== Regular season ====
Year	Team	GP	GS	MPG	FG%	3P%	FT%	RPG	APG	SPG	BPG	TO	PPG
1998	Washington	30	1	13.2	.297	.286	.788	0.8	1.3	0.4	0.0	1.7	4.8
Career	1 year, 1 team	30	1	13.2	.297	.286	.788	0.8	1.3	0.4	0.0	1.7	4.8

=== College ===
Year	Team	GP	GS	MPG	FG%	3P%	FT%	RPG	APG	SPG	BPG	TO	PPG
1992–93	George Mason	26	-	-	35.6	33.7	70.2	1.6	2.6	1.2	0.0	-	8.5
1993–94	George Mason	**32**	-	-	38.2	34.8	80.0	2.7	3.7	1.3	0.0	-	14.6
1994–95	George Mason	27	-	-	33.7	32.9	83.3	**4.9**	3.9	**1.6**	**0.1**	-	18.9
1995–96	George Mason	28	-	-	**40.6**	**36.5**	**84.1**	4.1	**5.3**	**1.6**	0.0	-	**19.6**
**Career**		113	-	-	37.1	34.5	81.5	3.3	3.9	1.4	0.0	-	15.5
Statistics retrieved from Sports-Reference.
