= Washington Mystics =

Women's National Basketball Association team in Washington, D.C.

- 2026 Washington Mystics season
- Conference: Eastern
- Leagues: WNBA
- Founded: 1998
- History: Washington Mystics; 1998–present
- Arena: CareFirst Arena
- Location: Washington, D.C.
- Team colors: Red, navy blue, silver, white
- Main sponsor: GEICO
- President: Michael Winger
- General manager: Sydney Johnson
- Head coach: Sydney Johnson
- Assistants: Jessie Miller; Emre Vatansever
- Ownership: Monumental Sports & Entertainment (Ted Leonsis)
- Championships: 1 (2019)
- Website: mystics.wnba.com
Heroine	Explorer

The Washington Mystics are an American professional basketball team based in Washington, D.C. The Mystics compete in the Women's National Basketball Association (WNBA) as a member of the Eastern Conference. The team was founded prior to the 1998 season, and is owned by Ted Leonsis through Monumental Sports & Entertainment, which also owns the Mystics' NBA counterpart, the Washington Wizards. The team plays in the CareFirst Arena in the Congress Heights neighborhood. Sheila C. Johnson is the team's managing partner.

The Mystics have qualified for the WNBA Playoffs in 13 of its 23 seasons of existence, and the franchise has been home to players including two-time WNBA MVP Elena Delle Donne, Tennessee standout Chamique Holdsclaw, shooting guard Alana Beard, and nearby Maryland product Crystal Langhorne. Until 2018, the Mystics were the only current WNBA franchise that had never made it to the WNBA Finals. They lost in the semifinals twice, to New York in 2002 and to the eventual champion Minnesota Lynx in 2017. After reaching the WNBA Finals for the first time in 2018, they won their first championship in 2019.

== History ==
=== 1998–2004: Early years ===
Logo from 1998 to 2010

On October 1, 1997, the city of Washington, D.C. was selected as a potential city for a WNBA expansion team. On November 11, the selection was made official, with the team to begin play during the 1998 season. On December 16, 1997, Abe Pollin, chairman of Washington Sports and Entertainment (WSELP), announced that the team would be known as the Washington Mystics, in keeping with the magic theme shared by the NBA's Washington Wizards. The league held their first expansion draft for the Mystics and the Detroit Shock on February 18, 1998.

The Mystics finished the 1998 season with a WNBA worst 3–27 record, despite being led by Olympian Nikki McCray. Although they did not make the playoffs that year, the team had high expectations after drafting University of Tennessee star Chamique Holdsclaw in 1999. Washington improved but again failed to make the playoffs as they finished with a 12–20 record. Holdsclaw would lead the team to the playoffs in 2000, making the playoffs with a record of 14–18, losing to the New York Liberty in a first-round sweep.

After being tied for the worst record in the WNBA in 2001 with a 10–22 record, coach Tom Maher and General Manager Melissa McFerrin both resigned. With the future of the franchise up in the air, Mystics assistant coach Marianne Stanley took over as head coach. With the duo of Holdsclaw and rookie guard Stacey Dales-Schuman, the Mystics made the playoffs in 2002 with a 17–15 record. They would sweep the Charlotte Sting in the first round, but lose to New York again in the Eastern Conference Finals 2 games to 1. This would be the only time the Mystics would win a playoff series until 2017.

In 2003, the Mystics would make a franchise second-worst record in franchise history with a 9–25 record, last in the Eastern Conference.

Rumors of Holdsclaw being unhappy playing in Washington came to a head in 2004 when the Mystics star was sidelined with an unspecified ailment, later revealed to be a bout with depression. With their all-star out, rookie and Duke University standout Alana Beard led a depleted Mystics team to a surprising playoff appearance, the third in Mystics history. They finished the 2004 season at 17–17, but lost in the first round to the Connecticut Sun in 3 games.

=== 2005–2007: Changes in the organization ===
The 2005 season saw deep changes in the Mystics organization. Former star Holdsclaw joined the Los Angeles Sparks and the team was sold by Washington Sports and Entertainment to Ted Leonsis. In 2005, the team finished the regular season with a record of 16–18 and failed to make the playoffs.

In 2006, the Mystics posted an 18–16 record thriving under star guard Alana Beard who was drafted in 2004. The Mystics entered the playoffs as the 4th seed. In the first round, Washington was ultimately swept by the Connecticut Sun, the first-seeded team in the East.

The Mystics finished with a 16–18 record in 2007. In a more competitive conference, the team was satisfied by its near-.500 finish. However, at the end of the season, the Mystics had the same record as the New York Liberty. Since the Liberty won the regular-season series against the Mystics, Washington lost the tiebreaker and was eliminated from playoff contention.

=== 2008: At the bottom yet again ===
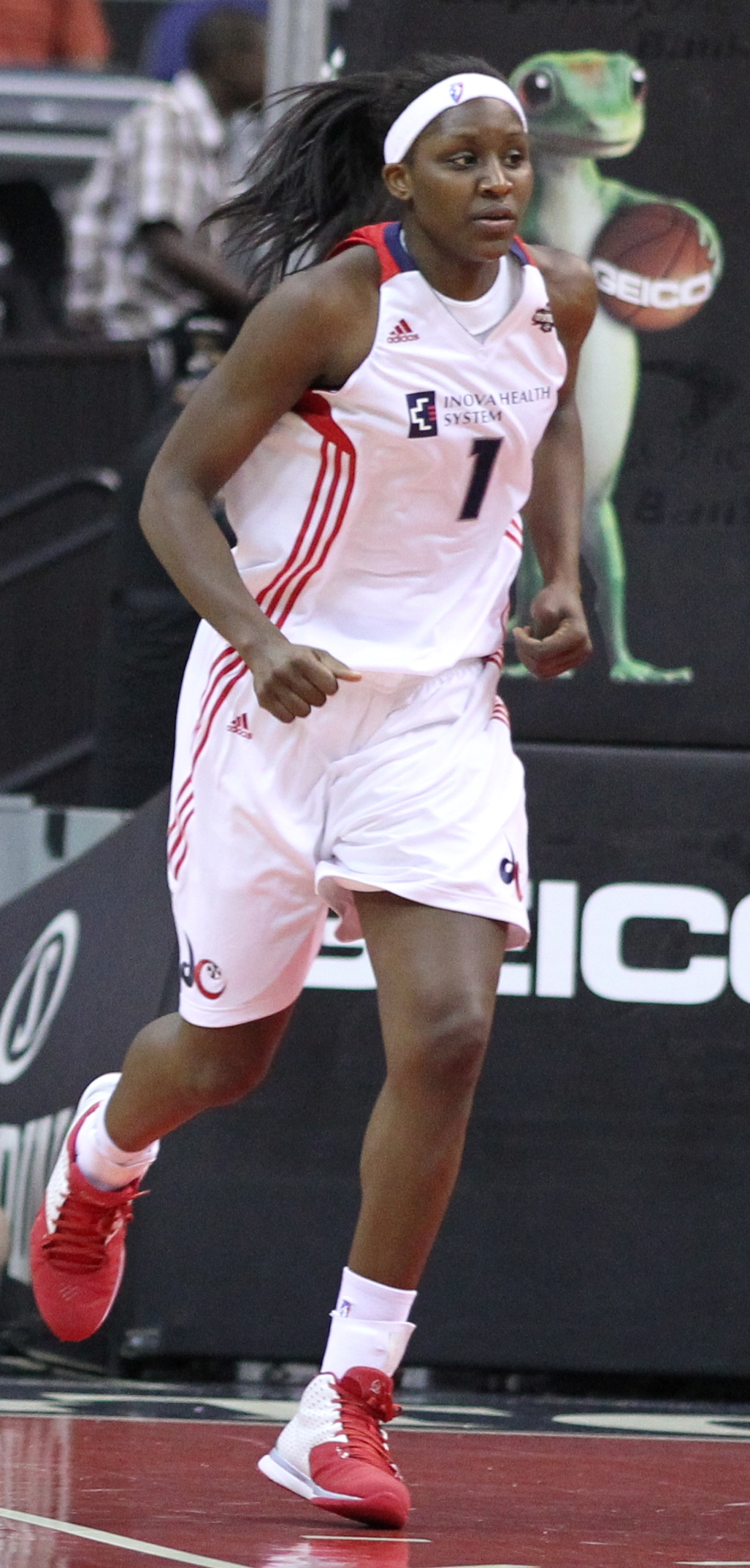
Crystal Langhorne in 2011

In 2008, the Mystics looked to build on their near-playoff appearance in a tough Eastern Conference. They drafted Crystal Langhorne of Maryland with the 6th pick in the 2008 WNBA draft. Plagued again by coaching problems, the Mystics fell to the bottom of the East again, finishing only in front of the expansion Atlanta team. The Mystics had gone through 10 coaches in 11 years of existence, the most in the WNBA. The Mystics front office knew it needed to completely clean out the entire coaching and management staff.

=== Changes, part two (2009–2012) ===
During the 2008/2009 WNBA off-season, the Mystics released general manager Linda Hargrove (replaced by Angela Taylor) and interim coach Jessie Kenlaw (replaced by Julie Plank). Under the new general manager, underperforming players were waived as new players were signed. With the second pick in the Houston dispersal draft and the 2009 WNBA draft, the Mystics selected Matee Ajavon and Marissa Coleman, respectively. The Mystics hoped to take advantage of the team changes and finally find consistency in their play.

By the time the season began, the Mystics surprisingly started 3–0. They went 13–18 since the first three games, but their 16–18 record was good enough to reach the playoffs. However, in their playoff comeback, the eventual conference champion Indiana Fever was too much for Washington to handle and the Mystics were swept in the first round. This would be the final season Alana Beard played a game for the Mystics, as she suffered two season-ending injuries in the 2009 and 2010 offseasons, respectively.

The Mystics had their best season ever in 2010. Led by Lindsey Harding, Katie Smith, and Crystal Langhorne, the Mystics took first place in the East with a record of 22–12. However, despite holding a 3–1 edge in regular-season games, they were swept in the first round, including a 24-point blowout in the elimination game, by the eventual WNBA Finals runner-up, the Atlanta Dream.

Prior to the 2011 season, the Mystics made many controversial changes. Coming off their best season in franchise history, many had hoped the team would finally see some consistency; this was not the case. General manager Angela Taylor could not reach an agreement on a new contract and after head coach Julie Plank refused a request to handle both coach and GM duties which was reported as a cost-cutting measure, Mystics assistant coach Trudi Lacey was named to both positions. When asked if the departure of Plank and Taylor was one of the mistakes she said she had learned from at the 2012 WNBA draft lottery, Mystics owner Sheila Johnson said she couldn't discuss that matter, citing ongoing "human resource issues". After the coach/GM change Harding and Smith both demanded trades to specific teams which were granted (to Atlanta and Seattle, respectively). In addition, starting small forward Monique Currie tore her ACL while playing in Europe in January and was lost for most of the WNBA season. As a result of this off-season turmoil, the Mystics record in 2011 fell to 6–28 from 22-12 the year before. Alana Beard also left in free agency, leaving Crystal Langhorne at center and not much else.

After an even worse season in 2012 (5–29), Trudi Lacey was fired as the Mystics coach and GM. Although having the best odds of the four teams involved in the lottery held on September 26, 2012, for the 2013 WNBA draft, the Mystics ended up with the 4th pick, missing out on drafting one of the three highly touted players available in the 2013 WNBA draft; which was Brittney Griner, Elena Delle Donne and Skylar Diggins.

=== 2013–2016: Rebuilding, a bright future ===
Despite missing out on a top 3 draft pick, the Mystics remained positive and continued their rebuilding phase while adding some young talent with future potential to their roster. Prior to the 2013 WNBA season, the Mystics drafted Tayler Hill and Emma Meesseman in the 2013 WNBA draft. After the firing of Trudi Lacey, the Mystics hired Mike Thibault as their new head coach and GM.

In the 2013 WNBA season, the Mystics were 17-17 and made the playoffs losing in the first round.

Prior to the 2014 WNBA season, the Mystics drafted Bria Hartley and Stefanie Dolson in the 2014 WNBA draft. In the 2014 WNBA season, Meesseman became the starting center for the Mystics. They finished 16-18 and made the playoffs but lost in the first round yet again.

In the 2015 WNBA season the Mystics made a change in their starting line-up by putting Dolson at center and Meesseman at power forward. The Big-women duo would have breakout seasons as they both were selected into the 2015 WNBA All-Star Game. Later on, in the season, the Mystics finished 18-16 and made the playoffs, but were once again a first-round exit.

Going into the 2016 WNBA season, the Mystics kept acquiring and developing young talent. They drafted Kahleah Copper in the 2016 WNBA draft and put Hill in the starting line-up. Hill would have a breakout season, leading the Mystics in scoring with a career-high 15.4 ppg and was second place in voting for the WNBA Most Improved Player award. The Mystics would unfortunately not make the playoffs, finishing with a disappointing 13–21 record but showed signs of promise in the future. Meesseman continued to improve after her breakout season, averaging a career-high 15.2 ppg. Also on September 7, 2016, the Mystics scored a franchise record of 118 points along with 16 three-pointers (another franchise record) in a 118–81 victory over the Chicago Sky.

On September 28, 2016, they won the second overall pick in the 2017 WNBA draft.

=== 2017–2022: The Delle Donne era ===
During the 2016–17 off-season, the Mystics were busy in the trade market. With enough trade assets, they were determined to make a trade for a superstar player. First, on January 30, the team executed a three-way deal with the New York Liberty and Seattle Storm, sending Bria Hartley and Kia Vaughn to the Liberty and receiving the Storm's #6 pick in the 2017 draft. This proved the prelude to an even larger deal as it freed up cap space to land a superstar on their team. Officially announced on February 2, the Mystics traded Kahleah Copper, Stefanie Dolson and the second overall pick in the 2017 WNBA draft to the Chicago Sky in exchange for 2015 league MVP Elena Delle Donne. Also during the off-season in free agency they would sign three-point specialist Kristi Toliver (who had just won a championship with the Los Angeles Sparks in the previous season), upgrading their roster into a championship contender. However, with Meesseman missing some games due to overseas commitment, and Tayler Hill out with a torn ACL midway through the season, the Mystics were the number 6 seed in the league with an 18–16 record. The Mystics defeated the Dallas Wings 86–76 in the first round elimination game. In the second round elimination game, the Mystics defeated the New York Liberty 82–68, advancing past the second round for the first time in franchise history, coming off a record-setting performance by Toliver, as she drained 9 three-pointers in the win. In the semi-finals, the Mystics were defeated by the Minnesota Lynx in a 3-game sweep, who would go on to win the 2017 WNBA championship.

In the 2018 WNBA season, the Mystics played without their starting power forward Emma Meesseman, who played for Team Belgium in the FIBA World Tournament. The Mystics made some adjustments in their starting lineup to compensate for her absence. One month into the season, Tayler Hill made her return to the team after recovering from her ACL injury, but she was traded a month later to the Dallas Wings in exchange for Aerial Powers. That trade helped the Mystics boost their roster's wing depth. The Mystics finished as the No. 3 seed in the league with a 22–12 record, receiving a bye to the second round. In the second-round elimination game, they defeated the Los Angeles Sparks 96–64, advancing to the semifinals for the second year in a row. In the semifinals, the Mystics defeated the #2 seeded Atlanta Dream in an intense five-game series, advancing to the WNBA Finals for the first time in franchise history. In the finals, they were swept by the Seattle Storm.

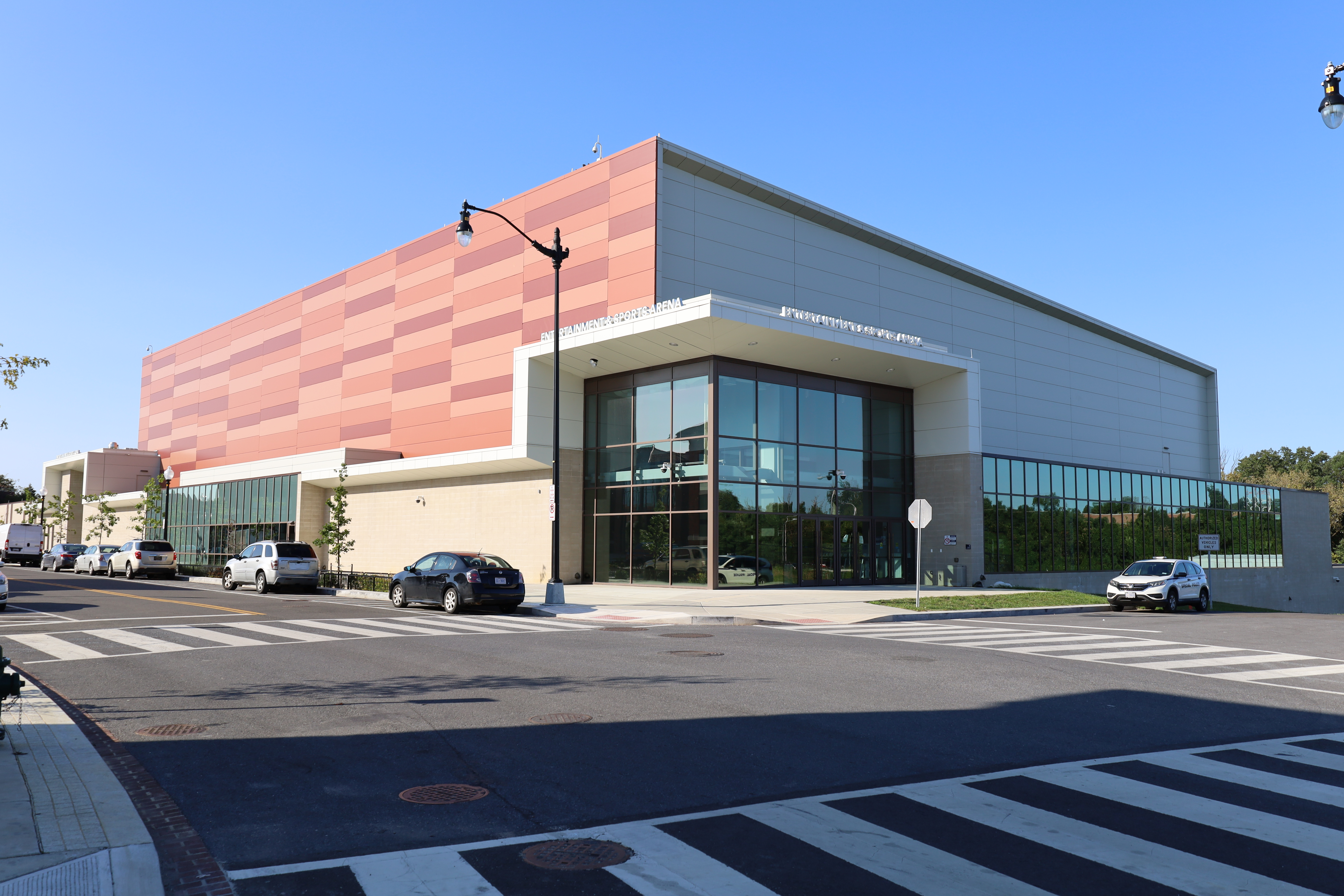
Entertainment and Sports Arena

For the 2019 WNBA season, the Mystics moved to play in the new Entertainment and Sports Arena (now the CareFirst Arena), in Southeast D.C.. The move was made because Mystics’ crowds were not filling the much larger Capitol One Arena; the move also allowed the Mystics to use a new practice facility and to avoid conflicts at Capitol One with college games, concerts, conventions, and renovations. Meesseman returned for the year, and she powered the Mystics towards achieving an unprecedented regular season record of 26–8, leading the entire league in total wins and losses and earning them the top spot in the playoffs. With a dogged determination to come back to the Finals and high hopes that a Finals title would at last be within their grasp, the Mystics began their playoff run skipping the two single-elimination rounds to a semifinal series against the Las Vegas Aces, just more than a year after Washington and Las Vegas's NHL teams, the Capitals and the Golden Knights, competed in the 2018 Stanley Cup Final with the former emerging victorious. The Mystics held off the Aces on the first two home games for an insurmountable 2–0 series lead, before finishing them off in Game 4 after the Aces made a desperate bid to extend the series with a Game 3 defeat. The Mystics then returned to the Finals against the Connecticut Sun, a team that had the second-best record in the regular season that was no less hungry for a championship, having come a win short of one before. This time, the Mystics prevailed through five intense games, by winning the odd-numbered ones and losing the even-numbered ones, with the availability and health of playoffs MVP Elena Delle Donne becoming a crucial factor in the outcome. The Sun were able to tie the series twice by exploiting Donne's early exit in Game 2 due to a back injury, then drawing upon unrelenting resolve and willingness to learn from mistakes after a Game 3 loss to deny the Mystics an opportunity to close the series early on their home court. The Mystics finally earned their first-ever championship by erasing multiple deficits in the final tiebreaker game, before breaking through in the crucial final quarter to hold on to an 89–78 victory. Meesseman was honored as the Finals MVP.

In 2020, the Mystics finished as the No. 8 seed in the league, with a record of 9–13. In the playoffs, they were defeated by the Phoenix Mercury in the first round.

In 2021, they finished tied for eighth place in the league, with the New York Liberty and the Los Angeles Sparks, with a record of 12–20. With the Liberty winning the tie-breaker, the Mystics did not make the playoffs.

=== 2022–present: Shakira Austin era ===
On April 11, 2022, the Mystics got the third overall pick in the 2022 WNBA draft and they selected Shakira Austin from Ole Miss.

In the 2022 season, they finished as the No. 5 seed in the league, with a record of 22–14. In the playoffs, they were defeated by the Seattle Storm in the first round.

In 2023, the Mystics finished as the No. 7 seed in the league, in a three-way tie with the Atlanta Dream and the Minnesota Lynx, with a record of 19–21. In the playoffs, they were defeated by the New York Liberty in the first round.

In 2024, they finished in ninth place, with a record of 14–26, and did not make the playoffs.

Delle Donne did not play during the 2024 season, and on April 4, 2025, she announced her retirement from professional basketball via Instagram.

==== 2025–present: Leadership change, arrival of Sonia Citron and Kiki Iriafen ====
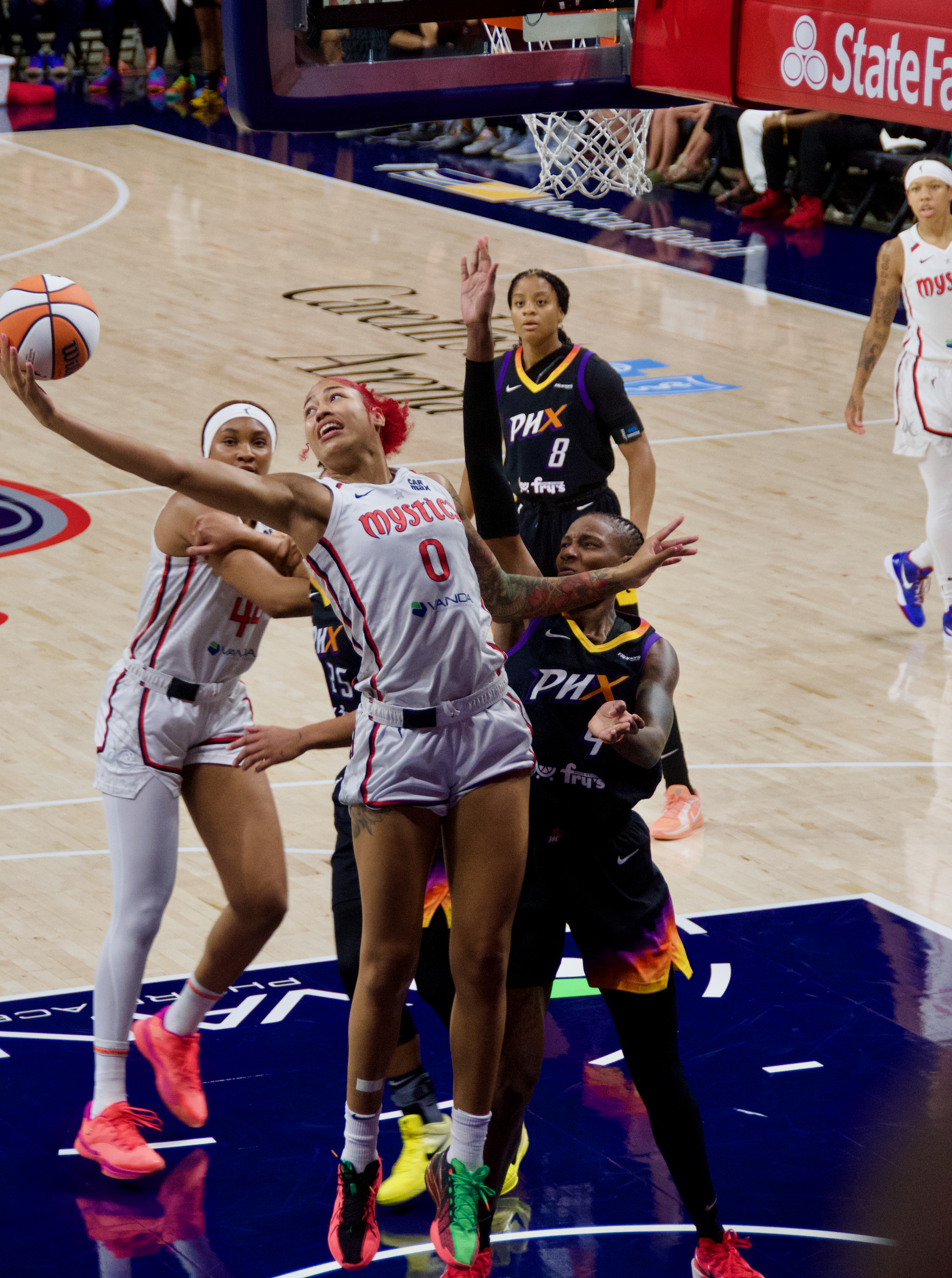
Shakira Austin in 2025

Following the departures of general manager Mike Thibault and head coach Eric Thibault in October 2024, the Mystics hired Jamila Wideman as GM and Sydney Johnson as head coach in December. The team used three first-round picks — Sonia Citron (No. 3), Kiki Iriafen (No. 4), and Georgia Amoore (No. 6) — as part of a youth-focused roster overhaul. Four 2025 home games were moved to EagleBank Arena in Fairfax, Virginia, and CFG Bank Arena in Baltimore, Maryland, following multiple 2024 sellouts. Washington standouts Citron and Iriafen made the WNBA All-Star game. At the August trade deadline, Washington traded Brittney Sykes to the Seattle Storm and Aaliyah Edwards to the Connecticut Sun in deals that returned veteran Alysha Clark, guard Jacy Sheldon, and future draft assets. At the end of the 2025 season they finished in tenth place, with a record of 16–28, and did not make the playoffs.

Before the 2026 draft, Mystics general manager Wideman was fired after one season, and head coach Sydney Johnson was given control of basketball operations. On April 13, 2026, in the WNBA draft, the team used two first-round picks to choose UCLA's Lauren Betts (No. 4), and Angela Dugalić (No. 9).

=== Uniforms ===
- 1998–2010: white with black and gold outlines at home, dark blue with black and gold outlines on the road.
- 2011–2012: white with red and blue outlines at home, red with white and blue outlines on the road. Both jerseys display the Inova Health System name on the front.
- 2013–2014: A new number font was introduced; Inova retained as a jersey sponsor.
- 2015–present: Inova sponsorship expires, and the team name (home jerseys) and city name (road jerseys) return.
- 2016: As part of a league-wide initiative for its 20th season, all games featured all-color uniform matchups. The Mystics retired the white uniform for this season in favor of a red jersey, while retaining the blue jersey as its dark-colored uniform.

== Attendance leaders ==
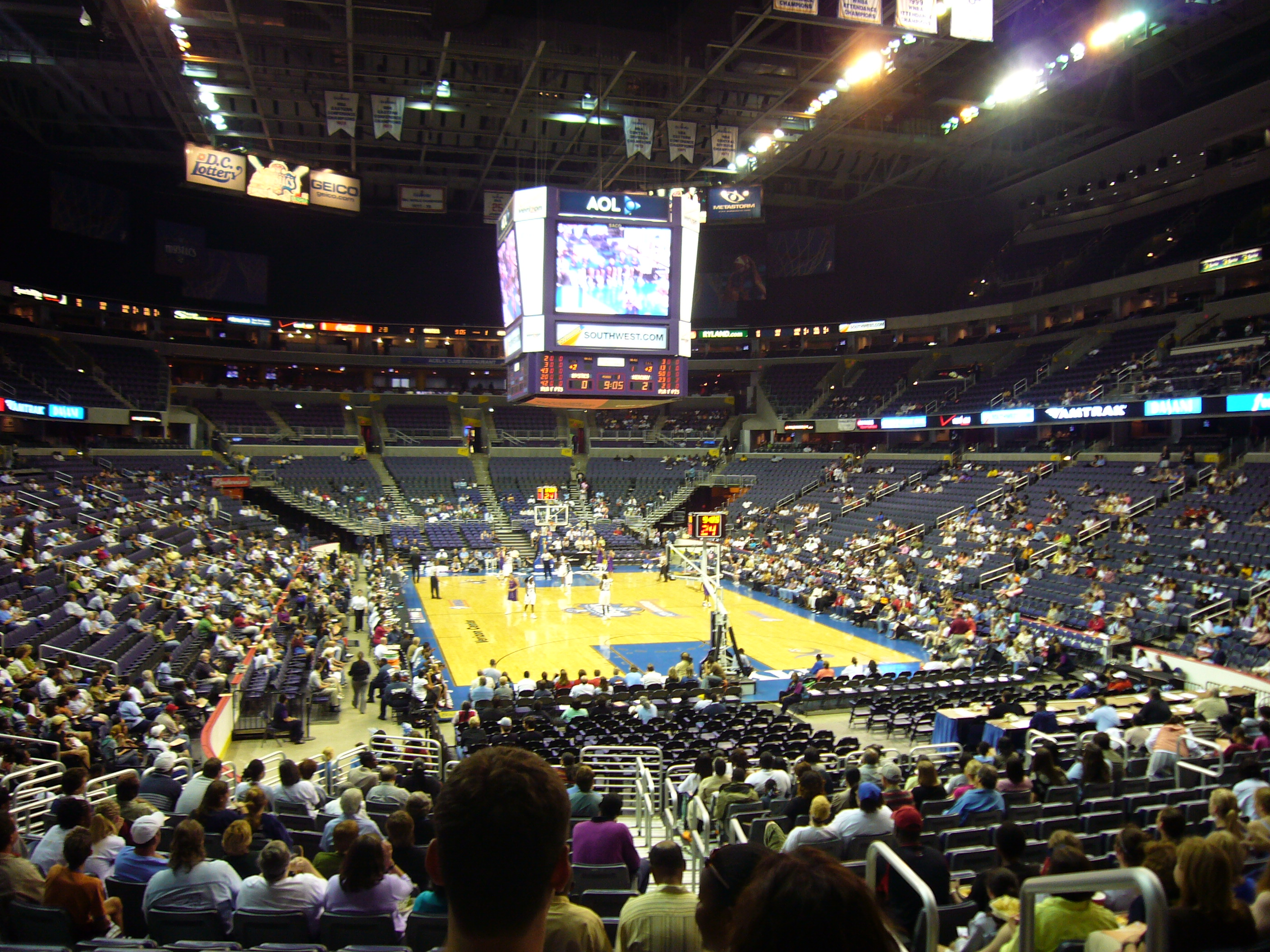
Capital One Arena, former home of the Mystics, photographed in 2007

The Washington Mystics led the WNBA in home attendance in the years 1998, 1999, 2000, 2002, 2004 and 2009. To celebrate the fans turning out for games, six banners were hung from the Verizon Center rafters celebrating each year the Mystics were "Attendance Champions."

The banners were mocked for years before Ted Leonsis, CEO of Monumental Sports & Entertainment, announced in a 2010 blog that the banners would be taken down, reasoning that the "only banners we should display revolve around winning a division or conference or league championship."

The Mystics' the CareFirst Arena, seats only 4,200. It is the league's second smallest home venue, with the smallest being Gateway Center Arena, the home of the Atlanta Dream, which seats 3,575. In 2024 the Mystics played 16 of their 20 home games in CareFirst Arena and 4 in the larger Capital One Arena, which has a capacity of 20,356.

== Season-by-season records ==
Season	Team	Conference		Regular season			Playoff Results	Head coach
Season	Team	Conference		W	L	PCT	Playoff Results	Head coach
Washington Mystics
1998	1998	East	5th	3	27	.100	Did not qualify	J. Lewis (2–16); C. Parson (1–11)
1999	1999	East	5th	12	20	.375	Did not qualify	Nancy Darsch
2000	2000	East	4th	14	18	.438	Lost Conference Semifinals (New York, 0–2)	N. Darsch (9–11); D. Walker (5–7)
2001	2001	East	8th	10	22	.313	Did not qualify	Tom Maher
2002	2002	East	3rd	17	15	.531	Won Conference Semifinals (Charlotte, 2–0); Lost Conference Finals (New York, 1–2)	Marianne Stanley
2003	2003	East	7th	9	25	.265	Did not qualify	Marianne Stanley
2004	2004	East	4th	17	17	.500	Lost Conference Semifinals (Connecticut, 1–2)	Michael Adams
2005	2005	East	5th	16	18	.471	Did not qualify	Richie Adubato
2006	2006	East	4th	18	16	.529	Lost Conference Semifinals (Connecticut, 0–2)	Richie Adubato
2007	2007	East	5th	16	18	.471	Did not qualify	R. Adubato (0–4); T. Rollins (16–14)
2008	2008	East	6th	10	24	.294	Did not qualify	T. Rollins (8–14); J. Kenlaw (2–10)
2009	2009	East	4th	16	18	.471	Lost Conference Semifinals (Indiana, 0–2)	Julie Plank
2010	2010	East	1st	22	12	.647	Lost Conference Semifinals (Atlanta, 0–2)	Julie Plank
2011	2011	East	6th	6	28	.176	Did not qualify	Trudi Lacey
2012	2012	East	6th	5	29	.147	Did not qualify	Trudi Lacey
2013	2013	East	3rd	17	17	.500	Lost Conference Semifinals (Atlanta, 1–2)	Mike Thibault
2014	2014	East	3rd	16	18	.471	Lost Conference Semifinals (Indiana, 0–2)	Mike Thibault
2015	2015	East	4th	18	16	.529	Lost Conference Semifinals (New York, 1–2)	Mike Thibault
2016	2016	East	6th	13	21	.382	Did not qualify	Mike Thibault
2017	2017	East	3rd	18	16	.529	Won First Round (Dallas, 1–0); Won Second Round (New York, 1–0); Lost WNBA Semifinals (Minnesota, 0–3)	Mike Thibault
2018	2018	East	2nd	22	12	.647	Won Second Round (Los Angeles, 1–0); Won WNBA Semifinals (Atlanta, 3–2); Lost WNBA Finals (Seattle, 0–3)	Mike Thibault
2019	2019	East	1st	26	8	.765	Won WNBA Semifinals (Las Vegas, 3–1); Won WNBA Finals (Connecticut, 3–2)	Mike Thibault
2020	2020	East	3rd	9	13	.409	Lost First Round (Phoenix, 0–1)	Mike Thibault
2021	2021	East	4th	12	20	.375	Did not qualify	Mike Thibault
2022	2022	East	3rd	22	14	.611	Lost First Round (Seattle, 0–2)	Mike Thibault
2023	2023	East	4th	19	21	.475	Lost First Round (New York, 0–2)	Eric Thibault
2024	2024	East	5th	14	26	.350	Did not qualify	Eric Thibault
2025	2025	East	4th	16	28	.364	Did not qualify	Sydney Johnson
2026	2026	East	2nd	28	16	.636	Lost First Round (Atlanta, 0–2)	Sydney Johnson
Regular season				425	525	.447	0 Conference Championships	
Playoffs				18	36	.333	1 WNBA Championship	

== Players ==
=== Current roster ===
Washington Mystics roster
Players
Coaches

Pos.	No.	Nat.	Name	Height	Weight	DOB	From	Yrs
G	8	(Australia)	Amoore, Georgia	5' 6" (1.68m)	155 lb (70kg)	2001-04-03	Kentucky	R
F/C	0	(United States)	Austin, Shakira	6' 5" (1.96m)	200 lb (91kg)	2000-07-25	Mississippi	4
C	51	(United States)	Betts, Lauren	6' 7" (2.01m)		2003-10-15	UCLA	R
G/F	22	(United States)	Citron, Sonia	6' 1" (1.85m)		2003-10-22	Notre Dame	1
F	32	(Serbia)	Dugalić, Angela	6' 4" (1.93m)		2001-12-29	UCLA	R
G	2	(Spain)	Flórez, Alicia	5' 9" (1.75m)		2004-04-19	Spain	R
G	3	(United States)	Harmon, Rori	5' 6" (1.68m)		2003-01-29	Texas	R
F	44	(United States)	Iriafen, Kiki	6' 3" (1.91m)		2003-08-26	USC	1
G/F	-	(United States)	Laney-Hamilton, Betnijah	6' 0" (1.83m)	166 lb (75kg)	1993-10-29	Rutgers	9
G	33	(United States)	Olsen, Lucy	5' 10" (1.78m)		2003-05-26	Iowa	1
F	12	(United States)	Onyenwere, Michaela	6' 0" (1.83m)	178 lb (81kg)	1999-08-10	UCLA	5
G/F	5	(United States)	Littlepage-Buggs, Darianna	6' 1" (1.85m)		2003-09-23	Baylor	R
G	23	(United States)	McMahon, Cotie	6' 0" (1.83m)		2004-05-04	Mississippi	R
G	18	(Canada)	Prosper, Cassandre	6' 3" (1.91m)		2005-06-25	Notre Dame	R

Head coach
(United States) Sydney Johnson (Princeton)
Assistant coaches
(United States) Jessie Miller (UIC)
(United States) Barbara Turner (Connecticut)
(Turkey) Emre Vatansever

Legend

- (C) Team captain
- (DP) Unsigned draft pick
- (FA) Free agent
- (S) Suspended
- Injured

WNBA roster page

East
ATL
CHI
CON
IND
NY
TOR
WAS
West
DAL
GS
LV
LA
MIN
PHO
POR
SEA

=== Other rights owned ===
Nationality	Name	Years pro	Last played	Drafted
(Serbia)	Sara Krnjić	0	N/A	2011
(Serbia)	Jelena Milovanović	1	2014	2009

=== Former players ===
- Nicky Anosike (2011)
- Ariel Atkins (2018 - 2024), now with the Chicago Sky
- Alana Beard (2004–2011)
- Kiesha Brown (2002–2005)
- Vicky Bullett (2000–2002)
- Keri Chaconas (1998)
- Marissa Coleman (2009–2011)
- Kahleah Copper (2016), now a member of the Phoenix Mercury
- Monique Currie (2007–2014)
- Stacey Dales (2002–2004)
- Lindsey Harding (2009–2010)
- Bria Hartley (2014–2016), now a member of the Phoenix Mercury
- Chamique Holdsclaw (1999–2004)
- Asjha Jones (2002–2003)
- Zuzana Žirková (2003)
- Crystal Langhorne (2008–2013)
- Kara Lawson (2014–2015)
- Nikki McCray (1998–2001)
- Taj McWilliams-Franklin (2008)
- Chasity Melvin (2004–2007, 2009–2010), now an assistant coach of the Phoenix Mercury
- Coco Miller (2001–2008)
- DeLisha Milton-Jones (2005–2007)
- Murriel Page (1998–2005)
- Nakia Sanford (2003–2010)
- Katie Smith (2010), now an assistant coach of the Minnesota Lynx
- Nikki Teasley (2006–2007)
- Kristi Toliver (2017–2019), now a member of the Los Angeles Sparks
- Kia Vaughn (2013–2016), now a member of the Phoenix Mercury

== Coaches and staff ==
=== Owners ===
- Abe Pollin, owner of the Washington Wizards (1998–2005)
- Monumental Sports & Entertainment/Ted Leonsis, owner of the Washington Wizards (2005–present)

=== Head coaches ===
Washington Mystics head coaches
Name	Start	End	Seasons	Regular season				Playoffs			
Name	Start	End	Seasons	W	L	PCT	G	W	L	PCT	G
Jim Lewis	December 29, 1997	July 24, 1998	1	2	16	.111	18	0	0	–	0
Cathy Parson	July 24, 1998	end of 1998	1	1	11	.083	12	0	0	–	0
Nancy Darsch	February 18, 1999	July 14, 2000	2	21	31	.404	52	0	0	–	0
Darrell Walker	July 14, 2000	end of 2000	1	5	7	.417	12	0	2	.000	2
Tom Maher	December 21, 2000	January 4, 2002	1	10	22	.313	32	0	0	–	0
Marianne Stanley	April 5, 2002	January 21, 2004	2	26	40	.394	66	3	2	.600	5
Michael Adams	February 17, 2004	April 15, 2005	1	17	17	.500	34	1	2	.333	3
Richie Adubato	April 21, 2005	June 1, 2007	3	34	38	.472	72	0	2	.000	2
Tree Rollins	June 1, 2007	July 19, 2008	2	24	28	.462	52	0	0	–	0
Jessie Kenlaw	July 19, 2008	end of 2008	1	2	10	.167	12	0	0	–	0
Julie Plank	November 6, 2008	November 1, 2010	2	38	30	.559	68	0	4	.000	4
Trudi Lacey	November 1, 2010	September 24, 2012	2	11	57	.162	68	0	0	–	0
Mike Thibault	December 18, 2012	November 15, 2022	10	174	155	.529	329	14	20	.412	24
Eric Thibault	November 15, 2022	October 23, 2024	2	33	47	.413	80	0	2	.000	2
Sydney Johnson	December 23, 2024	present	1	16	28	.364	44	0	0	–	0

=== General managers ===
- Melissa McFerrin (1998–2001)
- Judy Holland-Burton (2002–2005)
- Linda Hargrove (2005–2008)
- Angela Taylor (2009–2010)
- Trudi Lacey (2011–2012)
- Mike Thibault (2013–2024)
- Jamila Wideman (2025–2026)
- Sydney Johnson (2026– )

=== Assistant coaches ===
- Cathy Parson (1998)
- Wes Unseld Jr. (1998)
- Melissa McFerrin (1999–2001)
- Jenny Boucek (1999)
- Tyrone Beaman (2000)
- Marianne Stanley (2001, 2010–2019)
- Linda Hill-MacDonald (2002–2003)
- Ledell Eackels (2002–2003)
- Linda Hargrove (2004)
- Stephanie Ready (2004)
- Marynell Meadors (2005–2006)
- Jeff House (2005–2006)
- Tree Rollins (2006–2007)
- Crystal Robinson (2007–2008)
- Jessie Kenlaw (2007–2008)
- Lubomyr Lichonczak (2009)
- Vanessa Nygaard (2009)
- Vicky Bullett (2009)
- Trudi Lacey (2009–2010)
- Laurie Byrd (2011–2012)
- Jennifer Gillom (2012)
- Eric Thibault (2013–2022)
- Asjha Jones (2020–2021)
- LaToya Sanders (2019–2024)
- Shelley Patterson (2022–2024)
- Ashlee McGee (2023–2024)
- Jessie Miller (2025–present)
- Emre Vatansever (2025–present)

== Statistics ==
Washington Mystics statistics

1990s
Season	Individual			Team vs Opponents		
Season	PPG	RPG	APG	PPG	RPG	FG%
1998	N. McCray (17.7)	A. Santos de Oliveira (8.1)	N. McCray (3.1)	65.1 vs 80.5	30.8 vs 34.5	.395 vs .468
1999	N. McCray (17.5)	C. Holdsclaw (7.9)	A. Nagy (4.6)	65.6 vs 70.2	31.7 vs 31.1	.423 vs .415

2000s
Season	Individual			Team vs Opponents		
Season	PPG	RPG	APG	PPG	RPG	FG%
2000	C. Holdsclaw (17.5)	C. Holdsclaw (7.5)	A. Nagy (5.1)	68.0 vs 69.4	29.6 vs 28.5	.459 vs .451
2001	C. Holdsclaw (16.8)	C. Holdsclaw (8.8)	A. Burgess (2.8)	60.3 vs 64.8	33.0 vs 33.4	.386 vs .407
2002	C. Holdsclaw (19.9)	C. Holdsclaw (11.6)	A. Burgess (3.6)	66.7 vs 66.1	32.4 vs 30.9	.422 vs .413
2003	C. Holdsclaw (20.5)	C. Holdsclaw (10.9)	S. Dales (3.4)	68.5 vs 73.5	31.9 vs 32.8	.409 vs .447
2004	C. Holdsclaw (19.0)	C. Holdsclaw (8.3)	A. Beard (2.7)	68.4 vs 70.1	31.3 vs 32.5	.418 vs .429
2005	A. Beard (14.1)	C. Melvin (5.9)	T. Johnson (5.2)	66.6 vs 67.8	27.7 vs 30.1	.430 vs .445
2006	A. Beard (19.2)	C. Melvin (6.6)	N. Teasley (5.4)	80.8 vs 78.1	32.4 vs 30.6	.462 vs .432
2007	A. Beard (18.8)	N. Sanford (7.1)	N. Teasley (3.3)	76.0 vs 77.6	32.9 vs 35.5	.404 vs .417
2008	A. Beard (16.1)	N. Sanford (5.7)	A. Beard (3.5)	69.6 vs 76.5	33.3 vs 32.1	.415 vs .443
2009	A. Beard (15.9)	C. Langhorne (7.9)	L. Harding (4.5)	76.0 vs 77.1	35.0 vs 32.7	.423 vs .433

2010s
Season	Individual			Team vs Opponents		
Season	PPG	RPG	APG	PPG	RPG	FG%
2010	C. Langhorne (16.3)	C. Langhorne (9.7)	L. Harding (4.0)	76.9 vs 73.3	34.2 vs 28.3	.451 vs .426
2011	C. Langhorne (18.2)	C. Langhorne (7.6)	M. Ajavon (3.1)	70.8 vs 78.8	33.1 vs 31.8	.406 vs .465
2012	C. Langhorne (14.7)	C. Langhorne (6.3)	J. Thomas (2.8)	68.6 vs 78.3	31.2 vs 32.6	.412 vs .460
2013	I. Latta (13.9)	C. Langhorne (7.2)	I. Latta (4.4)	75.5 vs 75.4	35.5 vs 34.4	.413 vs .413
2014	I. Latta (12.8)	E. Meesseman (6.4)	I. Latta (3.3)	74.3 vs 73.8	35.4 vs 33.8	.425 vs .412
2015	I. Latta (13.4)	E. Meesseman (6.3)	K. Lawson (3.6)	73.6 vs 71.2	32.4 vs 35.1	.421 vs .405
2016	T. Hill (15.4)	E.Meesseman (5.6)	N. Cloud (3.0)	80.7 vs 82.2	32.7 vs 35.2	.423 vs .443
2017	E. Delle Donne (19.7)	K. Thomas (9.6)	K. Toliver (3.4)	81.7 vs 81.0	36.3 vs 34.5	.416 vs .432
2018	E. Delle Donne (20.7)	E. Delle Donne (7.2)	N. Cloud (4.6)	84.5 vs 81.4	32.6 vs 34.2	.448 vs .447
2019	E. Delle Donne (19.5)	E. Delle Donne (8.3)	K. Toliver (6.0)	89.3 vs 77.3	33.4 vs 32.6	.469 vs .430

2020s
Season	Individual			Team vs Opponents		
Season	PPG	RPG	APG	PPG	RPG	FG%
2020	M. Hines-Allen (17.0)	M. Hines-Allen (8.9)	L. Mitchell (5.4)	80.0 vs 81.5	31.5 vs 34.7	.433 vs .464
2021	T. Charles (23.4)	T. Charles (9.6)	N. Cloud (6.4)	79.8 vs 83.6	33.3 vs 36.8	.410 vs .463
2022	E. Delle Donne (17.2)	S. Austin (6.5)	N. Cloud (7.0)	80.2 vs 75.9	34.9 vs 33.1	.439 vs .430
2023	E. Delle Donne (16.7)	S. Austin (7.0)	N. Cloud (6.2)	80.5 vs 80.9	32.3 vs 35.9	.428 vs .436
2024	A. Atkins (14.9)	S. Austin (6.8)	J. Vanloo (4.3)	79.3 vs 82.3	31.9 vs 35.4	.433 vs .443
2025	B. Sykes (15.4)	K. Iriafen (8.5)	B. Sykes (4.4)	77.1 vs 81.6	33.0 vs 32.3	.439 vs .444

== Media coverage ==
All Mystics game are broadcast on Monumental Sports Network and online through the Monumental Sports Network. Broadcasters for Mystics games are Meghan McPeak and Christy Winters Scott.

Some Mystics games are broadcast nationally on ESPN, ESPN2, Ion Television (WPXW-TV), CBS (WUSA), ABC (WJLA-TV), NBC (WRC-TV), Amazon Prime Video, USA, or NBCSN.

== All-time notes ==
=== Regular season attendance ===
- A sellout for a basketball game at Capital One Arena is 20,356.
- A sellout for a game at the CareFirst Arena is 4,200.

Regular season all-time attendance
Year	Average	High	Low	Sellouts	Total for year	WNBA game average
1998	15,910 (1st)	20,674	10,364	1	238,647	10,869
1999	15,306 (1st)	20,674	11,008	1	244,889	10,207
2000	15,258 (1st)	19,093	11,070	1	244,134	9,074
2001	15,417 (2nd)	19,093	11,302	1	246,667	9,075
2002	16,202 (1st)	19,766	14,004	0	259,237	9,228
2003	14,042 (1st)	19,683	11,052	0	238,710	8,800
2004	12,615 (1st)	18,436	8,784	0	214,448	8,613
2005	10,089 (2nd)	16,654	6,010	0	171,512	8,172
2006	7,662 (7th)	15,103	5,892	0	130,255	7,476
2007	7,788 (8th)	13,997	6,147	0	132,396	7,742
2008	9,096 (3rd)	11,517	6,146	0	154,637	7,948
2009	11,338 (1st)	17,220	9,738	0	192,747	8,039
2010	9,357 (3rd)	14,347	7,547	0	159,065	7,834
2011	10,531 (1st)	13,954	7,028	0	177,639	7,892
2012	8,639 (3rd)	12,569	5,980	0	146,861	7,452
2013	7,838 (6th)	14,411	6,174	0	133,242	7,531
2014	8,377 (4th)	16,117	5,828	0	142,413	7,578
2015	7,710 (4th)	17,114	5,262	0	131,076	7,184
2016	6,929 (8th)	12,778	4,430	0	117,795	7,655
2017	7,771 (5th)	15,597	5,320	0	132,112	7,716
2018	6,136 (8th)	11,354	4,139	0	98,176 (Note: The Mystics played only 16 home games instead of the expected 17. The Las Vegas Aces forfeited their August 3 game in Washington due to major travel disruptions.)	6,721
2019	4,546 (10th)	15,377 (Note: The Mystics played one 2019 home game at Capital One Arena.)	2,347	8	77,288	6,535
2020	Due to the COVID-19 pandemic, the season was played in Bradenton, Florida without fans.					
2021	2,183 (7th)	3,114	1,050	0	32,752	2,636
2022	3,983 (9th)	7,431 (Note: The Mystics played one 2022 home game at Capital One Arena.)	2,687	9	71,686	5,679
2023	4,391 (10th)	14,406 (Note: The Mystics played one 2023 home game at Capital One Arena.)	3,058	8	87,813	6,615
2024	6,542 (10th)	20,711 (Note: The Mystics played four 2024 home games at Capital One Arena.)	4,200	16	130,830	9,807
2025	5,303 (12th)	11,183 (Note: The Mystics played two 2025 home games at CFG Bank Arena and two 2025 home games at EagleBank Arena.)	4,200	18	116,666	10,986

=== Draft picks ===
- 1998 Expansion Draft: Heidi Burge (2), Penny Moore (4), Deborah Carter (6), Tammy Jackson (8)
- 1998: Murriel Page (3), Rita Williams (13), Angela Hamblin (23), Angela Jackson (33)
- 1999: Chamique Holdsclaw (1), Shalonda Enis (13), Andrea Nagy (25), Jennifer Whittle (37)
- 2000: Tausha Mills (2), Tonya Washington (18)
- 2001: Coco Miller (9), Tamara Stocks (25), Jamie Lewis (41), Elena Karpova (44)
- 2002: Stacey Dales-Schuman (3), Asjha Jones (4), LaNisha Cartwell (33), Teresa Geter (36)
- 2003 Miami/Portland Dispersal Draft: Jenny Mowe (8)
- 2003: Aiysha Smith (7), Zuzana Zirkova (21), Trish Juline (32), Tamara Bowie (36)
- 2004 Cleveland Dispersal Draft: Chasity Melvin (2)
- 2004: Alana Beard (2), Kaayla Chones (15), Evan Unrau (28)
- 2005: Temeka Johnson (6), Erica Taylor (19), Tashia Moorehead (32)
- 2006: Tamara James (8), Nikki Blue (19), Myriam Sy (33)
- 2007 Charlotte Expansion Draft: Teana Miller (6)
- 2007: Bernice Mosby (6), Megan Vogel (19), Gillian Goring (33)
- 2008: Crystal Langhorne (6), Lindsey Pluimer (19), Krystal Vaughn (33)
- 2009 Houston Dispersal Draft: Matee Ajavon (2)
- 2009: Marissa Coleman (2), Camille Lenoir (23), Jelena Milavanovic (24), Josephine Owino (28)
- 2010 Sacramento Dispersal Draft: Kristin Haynie (6)
- 2010: Jacinta Monroe (6), Jenna Smith (14), Shanavia Dowdell (18), Alexis Gray-Lawson (30)
- 2011: Victoria Dunlap (11), Karima Christmas (23), Sarah Krnjic (35)
- 2012: Natalie Novosel (8), LaSondra Barrett (10), Anjale Barrett (26), Briana Gilbreath (35)
- 2013: Tayler Hill (4), Nadirah McKenith (17), Emma Meesseman (19)
- 2014: Stefanie Dolson (6), Carley Mijovic (30), Kody Burke (32)
- 2015: Ally Malott (8), Natasha Cloud (15), Marica Gajić (32)
- 2016: Kahleah Copper (7), Lia Galdeira (19), Danaejah Grant (31)
- 2017: Shatori Walker-Kimbrough (6), Jennie Simms (18), Mehryn Kraker (27)
- 2018: Ariel Atkins (7), Myisha Hines-Allen (19), Rebecca Greenwell (31)
- 2019: Kiara Leslie (10), Sam Fuehring (34)
- 2020: Jaylyn Agnew (24), Sug Sutton (36)
- 2021: No Draft Picks
- 2022: Shakira Austin (3), Christyn Williams (14)
- 2023: Stephanie Soares (4), Elena Tsineke (20), Txell Alarcón (32)
- 2024: Aaliyah Edwards (6), Kaylynne Truong (21), Nastja Claessens (30)
- 2025: Sonia Citron (3), Kiki Iriafen (4), Georgia Amoore (6), Lucy Olsen (23), Zaay Green (32)

=== All-Stars ===
- 1999: Chamique Holdsclaw, Nikki McCray
- 2000: Chamique Holdsclaw, Nikki McCray
- 2001: Chamique Holdsclaw, Nikki McCray
- 2002: Stacey Dales-Schuman, Chamique Holdsclaw
- 2003: Chamique Holdsclaw
- 2004: None
- 2005: Alana Beard
- 2006: Alana Beard
- 2007: Alana Beard, Delisha Milton-Jones
- 2008: No All-Star Game
- 2009: Alana Beard
- 2010: Monique Currie, Lindsey Harding, Crystal Langhorne
- 2011: Crystal Langhorne
- 2012: No All-Star Game
- 2013: Crystal Langhorne, Ivory Latta
- 2014: Ivory Latta
- 2015: Stefanie Dolson, Emma Meesseman
- 2016: No All-Star Game
- 2017: Elena Delle Donne
- 2018: Elena Delle Donne, Kristi Toliver
- 2019: Elena Delle Donne, Kristi Toliver
- 2020: No All-Star Game
- 2021: Ariel Atkins, Tina Charles
- 2022: Ariel Atkins
- 2023: Elena Delle Donne
- 2025: Sonia Citron, Kiki Iriafen, Brittney Sykes
- 2026: Sonia Citron, Kiki Iriafen

=== Olympians ===
- 2000: Nikki McCray, Chamique Holdsclaw
- 2016: Leilani Mitchell (AUS)
- 2020: Ariel Atkins, Tina Charles, Leilani Mitchell (AUS)
- 2024: Jade Melbourne (AUS), Julie Vanloo (BEL)

=== Honors and awards ===
- 1999 Rookie of the Year: Chamique Holdsclaw
- 1999 All-WNBA Second Team: Chamique Holdsclaw
- 1999 Peak Performer (FG%): Murriel Page
- 2000 Peak Performer (FG%): Murriel Page
- 2001 All-WNBA Second Team: Chamique Holdsclaw
- 2002 Coach of the Year: Marianne Stanley
- 2002 Most Improved Player: Coco Miller
- 2002 All-WNBA Second Team: Chamique Holdsclaw
- 2002 Peak Performer (Scoring): Chamique Holdsclaw
- 2002 Peak Performer (Rebounds): Chamique Holdsclaw
- 2003 Peak Performer (Rebounds): Chamique Holdsclaw
- 2005 Rookie of the Year: Temeka Johnson
- 2005 All-Defensive Second Team: Alana Beard
- 2005 All-Rookie Team: Temeka Johnson
- 2006 All-WNBA Second Team: Alana Beard
- 2006 All-Defensive Second Team: Alana Beard
- 2007 All-Defensive First Team: Alana Beard
- 2009 Most Improved Player: Crystal Langhorne
- 2009 All-Defensive Second Team: Alana Beard
- 2009 All-Rookie Team: Marissa Coleman
- 2010 All-WNBA Second Team: Crystal Langhorne
- 2010 All-Defensive Second Team: Lindsey Harding
- 2013 Coach of the Year: Mike Thibault
- 2014 All-Rookie Team: Bria Hartley
- 2017 All-Rookie Team: Shatori Walker-Kimbrough
- 2018 All-WNBA First Team: Elena Delle Donne
- 2018 All-Rookie Team: Ariel Atkins
- 2018 All-Defensive Second Team: Ariel Atkins
- 2019 Most Valuable Player: Elena Delle Donne
- 2019 Finals MVP: Emma Meesseman
- 2019 All-WNBA First Team: Elena Delle Donne
- 2019 All-Defensive Second Team: Ariel Atkins
- 2019 All-Defensive Second Team: Natasha Cloud
- 2020 All-WNBA Second Team: Myisha Hines-Allen
- 2020 All-Defensive Second Team: Ariel Atkins
- 2021 Peak Performer (Points): Tina Charles
- 2021 All-Defensive Second Team: Ariel Atkins
- 2021 All-WNBA Second Team: Tina Charles
- 2022 All-Rookie Team: Shakira Austin
- 2022 All-Defensive First Team: Ariel Atkins
- 2022 All-Defensive First Team: Natasha Cloud
- 2022 Peak Performer (Assists): Natasha Cloud
- 2023 All-Defensive First Team: Brittney Sykes
- 2023 All-Rookie Team: Li Meng
- 2025 All-Rookie Team: Sonia Citron
- 2025 All-Rookie Team: Kiki Iriafen

== Hall of Famers ==
=== FIBA Hall of Famers ===
Washington Mystics Hall of Famers
Coaches
Name	Position	Tenure	Inducted
Tom Maher	Head Coach	2001	2021

== See also ==
- Sports in Washington, D.C.
