= Tricia Bader Binford =

American basketball coach (born 1973)

Montana State Bobcats
- Title: Head coach
- League: Big Sky Conference

Personal information
- Born: February 26, 1973 (age 53) Decatur, Illinois, U.S.
- Listed height: 5 ft 4 in (1.63 m)
- Listed weight: 125 lb (57 kg)

Career information
- High school: Roaring Fork (Carbondale, Colorado)
- College: Boise State (1991–1996)
- WNBA draft: 1998: 4th round, 31st overall pick
- Drafted by: Utah Starzz
- Position: Guard
- Number: 10, 11

Career history

Playing
- 1998–1999: Utah Starzz
- 1999–2002: Cleveland Rockers

Coaching
- 1999–2001: Boise State (assistant)
- 2003–2005: Utah State (assistant)
- 2005–present: Montana State

Career highlights
- As player: 3× All-Big Sky (1993, 1994, 1996); As coach: 5× Big Sky regular season champion (2016, 2017, 2020, 2023, 2025); 3× Big Sky tournament champion (2017, 2022, 2025); 5× Big Sky Coach of the Year (2016, 2020, 2021, 2023, 2025)
- Stats at Basketball Reference

Tricia Lynne Bader Binford (née Bader; born February 26, 1973) is an American former professional basketball player. A guard, she played for the Utah Starzz and Cleveland Rockers of the Women's National Basketball Association (WNBA). She is currently the head coach of the Montana State Bobcats. She played college basketball for the Boise State Broncos as a four-year starter at point guard, earning All-Big Sky Conference honors three times and setting the school's career assists record. She then played two seasons of professional basketball in Australia before being selected by the Utah Starzz in the fourth round of the 1998 WNBA draft. She played for the Starzz from 1998 to 1999 and for the Cleveland Rockers from 1999 to 2002. Following her playing career, she served as an assistant coach at Boise State and for the Utah State Aggies. She became the head coach of the Montana State Bobcats in 2005 and is the winningest coach in team history. Binford is also a five-time Big Sky women's basketball coach of the year.

== Early life ==
Tricia Lynne Bader was born on February 26, 1973, in Decatur, Illinois, and raised in Carbondale, Colorado. (Note: Some sources state she was born in Boise, Idaho.) She attended Roaring Fork High School in Carbondale, participating in basketball, volleyball, and track. She earned All-State honors three times in basketball and led the team to the 1989, 1990 and 1991 state basketball championships. Binford was named the Colorado Player of the Year and a Street and Smith's All-American her senior year in 1991. She was a two-time USA Today All-American as well.

Binford also won five state titles in track. Roaring Fork High named its "Three-Sport Athlete Award" after Binford. She was inducted into the Colorado High School Activities Association Hall of Fame in 2017.

== College career ==
Binford received offers from several in-state schools to play college basketball but instead decided to enroll at Boise State University. She played for the Boise State Broncos as a point guard from 1991 to 1996, and was a four-year starter. She played in 29 games during her freshman year in 1991–92, averaging 6.8 points, 2.6 rebounds, 2.3 assists, and 1.9 steals per game. She appeared in 27 games during the 1992–93 season, averaging 11.3 points, 3.3 rebounds, a conference-leading 4.7 assists, and 2.3 steals, earning All-Big Sky Conference honors. Binford participated in the 1993 U.S. Olympic Festival as part of the West team. She was the first Boise State basketball player, male or female, to ever play at the festival. She played in 29 games for Boise State in 1993–94, averaging 10.6 points, 3.7 rebounds, 4.8 assists, and a conference-leading 3.0 steals per game, garnering All-Big Sky recognition for the second consecutive season as Boise State advanced to the NCAA Division I women's basketball tournament for the first time. She appeared in three games in 1994–95 before suffering a season-ending ACL injury in the third contest. She played in 27 games her senior year in 1995–96, averaging 11.7 points, 2.7 rebounds, 3.9 assists, and 2.1 steals per game, earning All-Big Sky accolades for the third straight season. Binford was named the 1996 Idaho NCAA Woman of the Year.

Binford set the school record for career assists with 438 and finished second in steals with 259. Boise State had a 76–36 record in the four seasons she started at point guard. She graduated from Boise State with a degree in criminal justice in 1995. Binford was also a four-time Big Sky All-Academic selection in 1992, 1993, 1994, and 1996. Binford was inducted into the Boise State Hall of Fame in 2001.

== Professional career ==
After her college career, she underwent double-knee surgery and then spent two seasons playing professionally in Australia, spending time with the Brisbane Blazers of the Women's National Basketball League, the Launceston Tornadoes of the South East Australian Basketball League, and the Latrobe Demons of the North West Basketball Union (NWBU). She had a quadruple-double in a 1997 NWBU game, recording 67 points, 14 assists, 10 rebounds, and 10 steals. Her 67 points also set the league's single-game scoring record.

Binford was selected by the Utah Starzz in the fourth round, with the 31st overall pick, of the 1998 WNBA draft. She played in 22 games during her rookie WNBA season in 1998 and averaged 2.1 points per game as the team's third-string point guard. She made $19,000 during the 1998 season. Binford appeared in seven games for the Starzz in 1999 and averaged 0.3 points per game. She was waived by the Starzz on July 5, 1999, after a midseason coaching change.

On July 23, 1999, Binford was claimed off waivers by the Cleveland Rockers to bolster the team's depth at point guard after Suzie McConnell-Serio suffered an injury. Binford appeared in nine games for the Rockers in 1999, averaging 0.6 points, 1.2 rebounds, and 1.2 assists per game. She played in 25 games during the 2000 season and averaged 1.9 points per game as the third-string point guard behind backup Helen Darling and starter McConnell-Serio. Binford also appeared in five playoff games in 2000, averaging 1.6 points per game, as the Rockers advanced to the 2000 Eastern Conference Finals. She played in 19 games in 2001 as the third-string point guard behind Jennifer Rizzotti and starter Helen Darling, averaging 1.1 points per game. Binford also played in one playoff game that season, totaling zero points and one rebound in four minutes. A 2001 article in the Idaho Statesman noted that Binford, who was five feet, four inches tall, was one of the smallest players in the WNBA. She was the third-string point guard again in 2002, this time behind Brandi McCain and starter Jennifer Rizzotti. Binford appeared in 18 games during her final WNBA season and averaged 0.8 points per game.

== Coaching career ==
Binford was an assistant coach at Boise State from 1999 to 2001 during her time in the WNBA as the WNBA and college seasons did not overlap. She left Boise State in March 2001 to focus on her WNBA career, but in March 2002, it was reported that Binford—who was still in the WNBA—had applied for Boise State's vacant head coaching position. She was not hired. On April 22, 2003, she was hired as an assistant coach for the Utah State Aggies women's basketball team and served in that role during the 2003–04 and 2004–05 seasons. Her coaching duties with the Aggies included recruiting, defense, and guards.

On April 13, 2005, Binford was hired as the head coach of the Montana State Bobcats women's basketball team. She led the Bobcats to the Big Sky regular season title in 2015–16, 2016–17, 2019–20, 2022–23, and 2024–25. The Bobcats also won the Big Sky tournament title in 2016–17, 2021–22, and 2024–25. In 2019–20, the Bobcats won a Big Sky–record 19 conference games and advanced to the championship game of the 2020 Big Sky Conference women's basketball tournament, but the game was cancelled due to the COVID-19 pandemic. They earned a spot in the NCAA tournament in 2016–17, 2021–22, and 2024–25 as well. Binford was named the Big Sky women's basketball coach of the year in 2015–16, 2019–20, and 2024–25, and co-coach of the year in 2020–21 (shared with Seton Sobolewski) and 2022–23 (shared with Mark Campbell and Loree Payne). As of the 2024–25 season, she is the winningest basketball coach in school history for both men and women, having compiled a record of 359 wins and 252 losses in 20 seasons. Her 224 conference wins are also the second-most in Big Sky basketball history for both men and women, behind Robin Selvig. (Note: The winningest men's basketball coach in Big Sky history, Randy Rahe, had 198 conference wins.)

== Personal life ==
Binford met her husband Todd Binford while she was an assistant coach at Boise State. They have two children.

== Career playing statistics ==
Legend
GP	Games played	GS	Games started	MPG	Minutes per game	RPG	Rebounds per game
APG	Assists per game	SPG	Steals per game	BPG	Blocks per game	PPG	Points per game
TO	Turnovers per game	FG%	Field-goal percentage	3P%	3-point field-goal percentage	FT%	Free-throw percentage
**Bold**	Career best	°	League leader

=== WNBA ===
==== Regular season ====
Year	Team	GP	GS	MPG	FG%	3P%	FT%	RPG	APG	SPG	BPG	TO	PPG
1998	Utah	22	0	**9.4**	.302	.370	.500	.5	.9	.6	.0	1.2	**2.1**
1999	Utah	7	0	4.9	.000	.000	**1.000**	.3	.1	.4	**.1**	.6	.3
1999	Cleveland	9	0	8.0	.154	.125	–	**1.2**	**1.2**	.3	.0	**.3**	.6
2000	Cleveland	**25**	0	8.0	.354	.333	.833	.4	.8	**.7**	.0	.7	1.9
2001	Cleveland	19	0	6.0	**.400**	**.385**	–	.6	.6	.3	.0	.4	1.1
2002	Cleveland	18	0	7.3	.154	.071	.833	.4	.8	.3	**.1**	.4	.8
Career	5 years, 2 teams	100	0	7.6	.288	.284	.727	.5	.8	.5	.7	.0	1.4

==== Playoffs ====
Year	Team	GP	GS	MPG	FG%	3P%	FT%	RPG	APG	SPG	BPG	TO	PPG
2000	Cleveland	**5**	0	**7.2**	**.333**	**.667**	.000	.2	**.2**	**.4**	.0	.2	**1.6**
2001	Cleveland	1	0	4.0	.000	.000	–	**1.0**	.0	.0	.0	**.0**	.0
Career	2 years, 1 team	6	0	6.7	.273	.400	.000	.3	.2	.3	.0	.2	1.3

== Head coaching record ==
Record table
Season	Team	Overall	Conference	Standing	Postseason
Montana State Bobcats (Big Sky) (2005–present)
2005–06	Montana State	3–23	2–12	8th	
2006–07	Montana State	13–16	8–8	T-5th	
2007–08	Montana State	18–13	11–5	T-3rd	
2008–09	Montana State	15–15	8–8	3rd	
2009–10	Montana State	18–14	9–7	T-5th	
2010–11	Montana State	17–14	11–5	3rd	
2011–12	Montana State	19–11	10–6	T-3rd	
2012–13	Montana State	17–13	11–9	6th	
2013–14	Montana State	15–15	10–10	T-6th	
2014–15	Montana State	15–15	9–9	T-5th	
2015–16	Montana State	21–10	14–4	1st	WNIT First Round
2016–17	Montana State	25–7	15–3	T-1st	NCAA First Round
2017–18	Montana State	16–15	9–9	T-7th	
2018–19	Montana State	16–15	11–9	5th	
2019–20	Montana State	25–6	19–1	1st	
2020–21	Montana State	17–7	13–3	3rd	
2021–22	Montana State	22–13	14–6	T-2nd	NCAA First Round
2022–23	Montana State	20–11	13–5	T-1st	
2023–24	Montana State	17–16	10–8	T-4th	
2024–25	Montana State	30–4	17–1	1st	NCAA First Round
2025–26	Montana State	27–8	16–2	2nd	WNIT Great 8
Total:		386–261 (.597)			
National champion Postseason invitational champion Conference regular season champion Conference regular season and conference tournament champion Division regular season champion Division regular season and conference tournament champion Conference tournament champion
