= Raegan Pebley =

American basketball player and coach

Personal information
- Born: August 12, 1975 (age 51) Fountain Valley, California, U.S.
- Listed height: 6 ft 4 in (1.93 m)
- Listed weight: 169 lb (77 kg)

Career information
- High school: Mountain View (Orem, Utah)
- College: Colorado (1993–1997)
- WNBA draft: 1997: 3rd round, 21st overall pick
- Drafted by: Utah Starzz
- Playing career: 1997–1998
- Position: Power forward / center
- Number: 52, 51
- Coaching career: 1997–present

Career history

Playing
- 1997: Utah Starzz
- 1998: Cleveland Rockers

Coaching
- 1997–1999: George Mason (assistant)
- 1999–2001: Colorado State (assistant)
- 2003–2012: Utah State
- 2012–2014: Fresno State
- 2014–2023: TCU

Career highlights
- As player: Second-team All-Big 12 (1997)
- Stats at Basketball Reference

Jennifer Raegan Pebley (née Scott; born August 12, 1975) is an American basketball executive and former coach and player who most recently served as the general manager of the Los Angeles Sparks of the Women's National Basketball Association (WNBA).

Pebley has been the head women's coach at three NCAA Division I institutions, most recently TCU. Pebley played two seasons in the Women's National Basketball Association (WNBA) as Raegan Scott. A 6'4" forward, Pebley played college basketball at Colorado.

== Early life and college playing career ==
Born and raised in Orem, Utah, Pebley (born Jennifer Raegan Scott) graduated from Mountain View High School in Utah in 1993. Pebley then attended the University of Colorado Boulder and played at forward for the Colorado Buffaloes from 1993 to 1997. Pebley averaged 8.4 points and 5.6 rebounds and shot .445 from the field in 124 games. Pebley earned second-team All-Big 12 honors in 1997 and graduated from Colorado with a bachelor's degree in broadcast journalism.

== Professional playing career ==
Pebley was drafted in the third round (21st overall pick) of the 1997 WNBA draft by the Utah Starzz. She would miss the Starzz' first three games of the 1997 season, but then finally debut on June 28, 1997, in a 58–76 loss to the Houston Comets. In her debut game, Pebley recorded 2 points and 1 rebound in just under 6 minutes of playing time. She would go on to play just 8 games in the 1997 season and averaged 5.4 minutes, 1.5 points, and 0.9 rebounds.

Pebley's second season in the WNBA would end up being her final season in the league. She signed with the Cleveland Rockers and played 22 games for the team, averaging 7.6 minutes, 1.7 points, and 1.3 rebounds. The Rockers finished with a 20–10 record and reached the playoffs but were eliminated in the semi-finals by the Phoenix Mercury in three games. Game 3 of that series ended up being Pebley's final game of her career. The game was played on August 25, 1998, and the Rockers would lose 60–71, with Pebley recording 5 points, 2 rebounds and 1 block.

== Coaching career ==
While playing in the WNBA, Pebley was an assistant coach at George Mason from 1997 to 1999 during league offseasons. Pebley then was an assistant coach at Colorado State from 1999 to 2001.

On May 1, 2002, Pebley became head coach at Utah State, which reinstated its women's basketball program after a nearly 15-year hiatus, effective in the 2003–04 season. After a 5–22 record in her first season, Utah State improved to 14–14 in Pebley's second season. However, the team won just 23 games in the next three seasons, including a 3–24 record in 2005–06. In the 2008–09 season, Pebley led Utah State to a 16–15 (9–7 WAC) record, including the program's first-ever postseason win in the first round of the WAC Tournament before losing to eventual tournament champion Fresno State. Utah State again made history in 2010–11 by making its first-ever Women's National Invitation Tournament. In 2011–12, Pebley's final season with Utah State, the team went 21–10 for its first season with 20 or more wins and made the WNIT for the second straight season.

On April 7, 2012, Pebley was hired as the ninth head coach at Fresno State University, to replace Adrian Wiggins, who left to coach at the University of Mississippi. She went 46–20 (23–8 MW) in her two seasons, with two Mountain West Conference Tournament titles and two NCAA Tournament appearances as well.

On March 31, 2014, she was named head coach at TCU, replacing Jeff Mittie, who left after 15 seasons to coach at Kansas State University. TCU made the WNIT four times and had three 20-win seasons during Pebley's tenure. In the 2019–20 season, TCU was expected to qualify for the NCAA tournament, before the cancellation of the games amid the COVID-19 pandemic. In the next three seasons, her teams failed to reach a .500 record, going 10–15 in 2020–21, 6–22 in 2021–22 and 8–23 in 2022–23. She stepped down from the position at end of the season 2022–23 season.

== Executive career ==
On January 5, 2024, she was named the General Manager of the Los Angeles Sparks in the WNBA.

Pebley was fired on July 12, 2026.

== Broadcast career ==
In the summer of 2016, Pebley served as a color commentator for the Fox Sports Southwest broadcasts of Dallas Wings games alongside sportscaster Ron Thulin.

== Head coaching record ==
Record table
Season	Team	Overall	Conference	Standing	Postseason
Utah State Aggies (Big West Conference) (2004–2005)
2003–04	Utah State	5–22	5–13	T–7th	
2004–05	Utah State	14–14	9–9	6th	
Utah State Aggies (Western Athletic Conference) (2006–2012)
2005–06	Utah State	3–24	2–14	9th	
2006–07	Utah State	11–18	7–9	6th	
2007–08	Utah State	9–20	5–11	7th	
2008–09	Utah State	16–15	9–7	T–5th	
2009–10	Utah State	13–17	5–11	7th	
2010–11	Utah State	18–15	10–6	3rd	WNIT Second Round
2011–12	Utah State	21–10	11–3	2nd	WNIT First Round
Utah State:		110–155 (.415)	63–83 (.432)		
Fresno State Bulldogs (Mountain West Conference) (2012–2014)
2012–13	Fresno State	24–9	13–3	2nd	NCAA First Round
2013–14	Fresno State	22–11	13–5	2nd	NCAA First Round
Fresno State:		46–20 (.697)	26–8 (.765)		
TCU Horned Frogs (Big 12 Conference) (2014–2023)
2014–15	TCU	18–14	9–9	T–3rd	WNIT Second Round
2015–16	TCU	18–15	8–10	T–6th	WNIT Third Round
2016–17	TCU	12–18	4–14	9th	
2017–18	TCU	23–13	9–9	5th	WNIT Semi-Final
2018–19	TCU	24–11	10–8	5th	WNIT Semi-Final
2019–20	TCU	22–7	13–5	2nd	
2020–21	TCU	10–15	4–14	8th	
2021–22	TCU	6–22	2–16	10th	
2022–23	TCU	8–23	1–17	10th	
TCU:		141–138 (.505)	60–102 (.370)		
Total:		297–313 (.487)			
National champion Postseason invitational champion Conference regular season champion Conference regular season and conference tournament champion Division regular season champion Division regular season and conference tournament champion Conference tournament champion

== Career statistics ==
Legend
GP	Games played	GS	Games started	MPG	Minutes per game	RPG	Rebounds per game
APG	Assists per game	SPG	Steals per game	BPG	Blocks per game	PPG	Points per game
TO	Turnovers per game	FG%	Field-goal percentage	3P%	3-point field-goal percentage	FT%	Free-throw percentage
**Bold**	Career best	°	League leader

=== WNBA ===
==== Regular season ====
Year	Team	GP	GS	MPG	FG%	3P%	FT%	RPG	APG	SPG	BPG	TO	PPG
1997	Utah	8	0	5.4	**38.5**	0.0	**100.0**	0.9	0.1	0.1	**0.4**	**0.0**	1.5
1998	Cleveland	**22**	0	**7.6**	36.8	0.0	83.3	**1.3**	**0.3**	0.1	0.2	0.4	**1.7**
Career	2 years, 2 teams	30	0	7.0	37.3	0.0	85.7	1.2	0.3	0.1	0.3	0.3	1.7

==== Playoffs ====
Year	Team	GP	GS	MPG	FG%	3P%	FT%	RPG	APG	SPG	BPG	TO	PPG
1998	Cleveland	3	0	8.7	33.3	0.0	100.0	2.3	0.0	0.0	0.3	0.0	3.0
Career	1 years, 1 team	3	0	8.7	33.3	0.0	100.0	2.3	0.0	0.0	0.3	0.0	3.0

=== College ===
Year	Team	GP	GS	MPG	FG%	3P%	FT%	RPG	APG	SPG	BPG	TO	PPG
1993–94	Colorado	24	-	-	46.0	0.0	61.5	3.2	0.4	0.5	0.8	-	4.5
1994–95	Colorado	33	-	-	42.7	0.0	**81.7**	3.8	0.9	0.6	0.6	-	6.7
1995–96	Colorado	**35**	-	-	43.1	0.0	81.0	6.4	1.2	1.2	**1.7**	-	9.2
1996–97	Colorado	32	-	-	**46.6**	**25.0**	77.0	**8.6**	**1.4**	**1.8**	1.4	-	**12.3**
**Career**		124	-	-	44.5	14.3	77.9	5.7	1.0	1.1	1.2	-	8.4
Statistics retrieved from Sports-Reference.
