= Rushia Brown =

American basketball player (born 1972)

Personal information
- Born: May 5, 1972 (age 54) New York City, New York, U.S.
- Listed height: 6 ft 2 in (1.88 m)
- Listed weight: 175 lb (79 kg)

Career information
- High school: Summerville (Summerville, South Carolina)
- College: Furman (1989–1994)
- Position: Forward
- Number: 34

Career history
- 1997–2002: Cleveland Rockers
- 2003: Charlotte Sting

Career highlights
- 4× First-team All-Southern (1990, 1992–1994); Southern Conference Player of the Year (1992)
- Stats at WNBA.com
- Stats at Basketball Reference

Rushia Brown (born May 5, 1972) is an American former professional basketball player. She played college basketball for the Furman Paladins and professionally for the Cleveland Rockers and Charlotte Sting of the Women's National Basketball Association (WNBA).

== Early life ==
Brown was born May 5, 1972, in New York City, New York. She attended Summerville High School in Summerville, South Carolina.

== College career ==
Brown played college basketball for the Furman Paladins from 1989 to 1994. Her freshman season, she played in 29 games and recorded a field goal percentage of 56.8%, both of which led all Southern Conference players. She was first in the conference in her junior year in rebounds (9.3), steals (3.2), and points (21.0) per game. In her fifth-year senior season, she led the conference in blocks per game, with 1.7. She was selected first-team All-Southern in 1990, 1992, 1993, and 1994, and was named the Southern Conference Player of the Year in 1992.

Brown was inducted into the Furman Athletics Hall of Fame in 1999. Furman retired her no. 34 jersey and she holds school records in career field goals (908), points (2,169), points per game (19.0), blocks (193), blocks per game (1.69), steals (341), and steals per game (2.99).

Brown was inducted into the Southern Conference Hall of Fame in 2014.

== Professional career ==
Brown played in the Women's National Basketball Association (WNBA) for seven seasons. Her debut game was played on June 21, 1997 in a 56–76 loss to the Houston Comets. In her debut, Brown recorded four points, two rebounds, one assist, and one block in nearly five minutes of playing time.

On May 22, 2002, Brown suffered a spiral fracture to her right pinky finger and was evaluated to miss 4–6 weeks of the season. She would indeed miss the first four games of the 2002 season, but returned on June 14 to record 11 points, two assists, and two steals in a 63–69 loss to the Washington Mystics.

On May 19, 2003, the Rockers traded Brown to the Charlotte Sting in exchange for Pollyanna Johns Kimbrough. In Game 2 of the 2003 WNBA playoffs, which Brown started, she tallied one point, seven rebounds, and two assists as the Sting fell to the Sun 62–68.

Brown missed the 2004 season but signed a contract with the Sting again on March 16, 2005. However, she was waived two months later on May 20. She appeared in 210 WNBA games with 75 starts, averaging 5.9 points, 3.4 rebounds, and 1.0 steals per game. After her WNBA career, Brown also played for ten years overseas for professional teams in Spain, France, Italy, Greece, and South Korea.

== Executive career ==
On March 16, 2018, Brown was hired by the WNBA's Las Vegas Aces as the team's player programs and franchise development manager.

In May 2020, the Los Angeles Sparks hired Brown as the team's director of community relations and youth sports.

== Philanthropy ==
Brown founded Servcom, a community-focused nonprofit organization whose "Play Like a Girl' initiative hosts clinics that train girl athletes where participants meet role models such as female professional athletes and female police officers. The organization has held these clinics in Cleveland and Indianapolis.

After learning of a fellow former WNBA player with a decorated career who had become homeless, Brown founded the Women's Professional Basketball Alumnae to help other former professional women's basketball players transition into life after retiring from sports.

== Personal life ==
Brown has a daughter.

== Career statistics ==
Legend
GP	Games played	GS	Games started	MPG	Minutes per game	RPG	Rebounds per game
APG	Assists per game	SPG	Steals per game	BPG	Blocks per game	PPG	Points per game
TO	Turnovers per game	FG%	Field-goal percentage	3P%	3-point field-goal percentage	FT%	Free-throw percentage
**Bold**	Career best	°	League leader

=== WNBA ===
WNBA regular season
Year	Team	GP	GS	MPG	FG%	3P%	FT%	RPG	APG	SPG	BPG	TO	PPG
1997	Cleveland	28°	3	18.3	**.520**	–	.734	4.0	0.7	1.2	**0.5**	**1.0**	6.3
1998	Cleveland	30°	7	17.4	.460	.000	.776	3.1	0.9	1.1	**0.5**	1.6	6.5
1999	Cleveland	30	12	14.5	.427	.000	.676	2.9	0.7	0.6	0.3	1.1	4.4
2000	Cleveland	30	22	22.6	.497	.500	**.846**	4.1	**1.5**	1.3	0.4	2.0	**8.4**
2001	Cleveland	30	**24**	**25.3**	.518	**1.000**	.730	**4.4**	1.2	**1.5**	0.3	1.2	8.3
2002	Cleveland	28	2	16.7	.400	.000	.737	2.7	1.0	0.8	0.3	1.4	4.0
2003	Charlotte	**34**°	5	14.2	.457	.000	.826	2.4	0.5	0.9	0.3	**1.0**	3.7
**Career**	7 years, 2 teams	210	75	18.4	.475	.250	.765	3.4	0.9	1.0	0.4	1.3	5.9

WNBA playoffs statistics
Year	Team	GP	GS	MPG	FG%	3P%	FT%	RPG	APG	SPG	BPG	TO	PPG
1998	Cleveland	3	0	7.0	.333	–	.500	1.0	0.0	1.7	0.0	1.7	1.7
2000	Cleveland	**6**	**6**	**27.8**	.467	.000	**.875**	**5.7**	1.7	**2.8**	0.3	2.8	**10.5**
2001	Cleveland	3	1	20.7	**.667**	–	.833	2.7	1.7	1.3	**0.7**	**1.0**	8.3
2003	Charlotte	2	1	23.0	.429	–	.500	4.0	**2.0**	1.0	0.0	2.0	3.5
**Career**	4 years, 2 teams	14	8	21.1	.493	.000	.824	3.8	1.4	2.0	0.3	2.1	7.1

=== College ===
NCAA statistics
Year	Team	GP	GS	MPG	FG%	3P%	FT%	RPG	APG	SPG	BPG	TO	PPG
1989–90	Furman	**29**	–	–	.568	–	.568	8.1	0.8	2.6	1.4	–	15.8
1990–91	Furman	4	–	–	.549	–	**.630**	7.0	0.8	2.0	**3.3**	–	18.3
1991–92	Furman	26	–	–	.582	.000	**.630**	9.3	1.1	3.2	2.3	–	**21.0**
1992–93	Furman	28	–	–	.602	.000	.546	**9.6**	**1.5**	**3.4**	1.2	–	18.8
1993–94	Furman	27	–	–	**.614**	.000	.607	9.1	1.1	2.9	1.7	–	**21.0**
**Career**		114	–	–	.591	.000	.594	9.0	1.1	3.0	1.7	–	19.0
