= 1998 WNBA playoffs =

Professional women's basketball tournament

- Dates: August 22–September 1, 1998

Final positions
- Champions: Houston Comets (Finals Champion)
- Runners-up: New York Liberty

Tournament statistics
- Scoring leader(s): Cynthia Cooper-Dyke (Houston) (129)

Awards
- MVP: Cynthia Cooper-Dyke (Houston)

The 1998 WNBA playoffs was the postseason for the Women's National Basketball Association's 1998 season which ended with the Houston Comets beating the Phoenix Mercury, 2-1. Cynthia Cooper was named the MVP of the Finals. The Comets repeated as champions.

== Regular season standings ==
Eastern Conference

Eastern Conference	W	L	PCT	Conf.	GB
Cleveland Rockers ^{x}	20	10	.667	12–4	–
Charlotte Sting ^{x}	18	12	.600	11–5	2.0
New York Liberty ^{o}	18	12	.600	8–8	2.0
Detroit Shock ^{o}	17	13	.567	8–8	3.0
Washington Mystics ^{o}	3	27	.100	1–15	17.0

Western Conference

Western Conference	W	L	PCT	Conf.	GB
Houston Comets ^{x}	27	3	.900	15–1	–
Phoenix Mercury ^{x}	19	11	.633	10–6	8.0
Los Angeles Sparks ^{o}	12	18	.400	6–10	15.0
Sacramento Monarchs ^{o}	8	22	.267	5–11	19.0
Utah Starzz ^{o}	8	22	.267	4–12	19.0

Note: Teams with an "X" clinched playoff spots.

== Bracket ==
For the playoffs, the four teams with the best record in the league were seeded one to four. Houston was switched to the Western Conference so two Western Conference teams matched up in the WNBA Finals.

**Semifinals**; Best-of-3
1	**Houston**	**2**
4	Charlotte	0
2	Cleveland	1
3	**Phoenix**	**2**

**WNBA Championship**; Best-of-3
1	**Houston**	**2**
3	Phoenix	1

- **Bold** – Series winner
- Italic – Team with home-court advantage

== Semifinals ==
=== Houston Comets vs. Charlotte Sting ===
August 22

Recap

**Houston Comets** **85**, Charlotte Sting 71
Scoring by half: 39–37, 46–34
Pts: Cynthia Cooper 27; Rebs: Tina Thompson 10; Asts: Kim Perrot 6	Pts: Rhonda Mapp 16; Rebs: Andrea Stinson 7 Asts: Andrea Stinson 7
**Houston leads series, 1–0**

Charlotte Coliseum, Charlotte, North Carolina
Attendance: 6,087
Referees: Bob Trammell, Teresa Dahlem, Sally Bell

August 24

Recap

Charlotte Sting 61, **Houston Comets** **77**
Scoring by half: 34–45, 27–32
Pts: Tracy Reid 18; Rebs: Vicky Bullett 11; Asts: Andrea Stinson 6	Pts: Cynthia Cooper 23; Rebs: Tina Thompson 14; Asts: Cooper, Perrot 5 each
**Houston wins series, 2–0**

Compaq Center, Houston, Texas
Attendance: 11,901
Referees: Bill Stokes, Gary Zielinski, Jason Phillips

=== Cleveland Rockers vs. Phoenix Mercury ===
August 22

Recap

Cleveland Rockers 68, **Phoenix Mercury** **78**
Scoring by half: 31–37, 37–41
Pts: Isabelle Fijalkowski 20; Rebs: Isabelle Fijalkowski 9 Asts: Nemcova, Edwards 4 each	Pts: Jennifer Gillom 21; Rebs: Gillom, Reed 5 each Asts: Umeki Webb 6
**Phoenix leads series, 1–0**

America West Arena, Phoenix, Arizona
Attendance: 11,631
Referees: Stan Gaxiola, June Courteau, Michael Price

August 24

Recap

Phoenix Mercury 66, **Cleveland Rockers** **67**
Scoring by half: 24–32, 42–35
Pts: Jennifer Gillom 27; Rebs: Jennifer Gillom 10; Asts: Michele Timms 6	Pts: Michelle Edwards 18; Rebs: Janice Braxton 10; Asts: Suzie McConnell-Serio 9
**Series tied, 1–1**

Gund Arena, Cleveland, Ohio
Attendance: 10,465
Referees: Scott Yarbrough, Patty Broderick, Bill Kennedy

August 25

Recap

**Phoenix Mercury** **71**, Cleveland Rockers 60
Scoring by half: 32–35, 39–25
Pts: Bridget Pettis 27; Rebs: Bridget Pettis 11; Asts: Michele Timms 8	Pts: Isabelle Fijalkowski 17; Rebs: Isabelle Fijalkowski 11; Asts: Eva Nemcova 5
**Phoenix wins series, 2–1**

Gund Arena, Cleveland, Ohio
Attendance: 8,420
Referees: Sally Bell, Gary Zielinski, Bill Stokes

== WNBA Championship ==
August 27

Recap

Houston Comets 51, **Phoenix Mercury** **54**
Scoring by half: 29–33, 22–21
Pts: Cynthia Cooper 29; Rebs: Sheryl Swoopes 11; Asts: Swoopes, Perrot 6 each	Pts: Jennifer Gillom 15; Rebs: Michelle Griffiths 12; Asts: Michele Timms 5
**Phoenix leads series, 1–0**

America West Arena, Phoenix, Arizona
Attendance: 13,634
Referees: Bill Stokes, June Courteau, Bill Kennedy

August 29

Recap

Phoenix Mercury 69, **Houston Comets** **74** (OT)
Scoring by half: 37–32, 29–34 Overtime: 3–8
Pts: Michele Timms 21; Rebs: Jennifer Gillom 9 Asts: Michelle Griffiths 3	Pts: Cynthia Cooper 27; Rebs: Sheryl Swoopes 13; Asts: Cynthia Cooper 6
**Series tied, 1–1**

Compaq Center, Houston, Texas
Attendance: 16,285
Referees: Sally Bell, Gary Zielinski, Michael Price

September 1

Recap

Phoenix Mercury 71, **Houston Comets** **80**
Scoring by half: 26–32, 45–48
Pts: Michelle Griffiths 24; Rebs: Jennifer Gillom 6 Asts: Michele Timms 7	Pts: Cynthia Cooper 23; Rebs: Tina Thompson 6 Asts: Swoopes, Cooper 6 each
**Houston wins series, 2–1**

Compaq Center, Houston, Texas
Attendance: 16,285
Referees: June Courteau, Gary Zielinski, Bill Kennedy

== See also ==
- WNBA Finals
