= Merlakia Jones =

American basketball player (born 1973)

Personal information
- Born: June 21, 1973 (age 53) Montgomery, Alabama, U.S.
- Listed height: 5 ft 11 in (1.80 m)
- Listed weight: 147 lb (67 kg)

Career information
- High school: George Washington Carver (Montgomery, Alabama)
- College: Florida (1991–1995)
- WNBA draft: 1997: 2nd round, 13th overall pick
- Drafted by: Cleveland Rockers
- Playing career: 1997–2004
- Position: Guard
- Number: 25

Career history
- 1997–2003: Cleveland Rockers
- 2004: Detroit Shock

Career highlights
- First Team All-WNBA (2001); 3× WNBA All-Star (1999–2001); 3× Honorable mention All-American (1993–1995); 3× First-team All-SEC (1993–1995); SEC All-Freshman Team (2002)

Career WNBA statistics
- Field goal %: .420
- Free throw %: .753
- Points: 2,353
- Stats at Basketball Reference
Medals
Women's basketball
Representing the United States
World University Games
Silver medal – second place	1995 Fukuoka, Japan	Team competition

Merlakia Jones (born June 21, 1973) is an American former college and professional basketball player who was a guard in the Women's National Basketball Association (WNBA) for eight seasons during the 1990s and 2000s. Jones played college basketball for the University of Florida, and then played professionally for the Cleveland Rockers and Detroit Shock of the WNBA.

== Early years ==
Jones was born to George and Jacqueline Jones in Montgomery, Alabama. She attended George Washington Carver in Montgomery, and was a standout high school basketball player for the G.W. Carver Wolverines.

== College career ==
Jones accepted an athletic scholarship to attend the University of Florida in Gainesville, Florida, where she played for coach Carol Ross's Florida Gators women's basketball team from 1991 to 1995.

== Career statistics ==
=== WNBA ===
Legend
GP	Games played	GS	Games started	MPG	Minutes per game	RPG	Rebounds per game
APG	Assists per game	SPG	Steals per game	BPG	Blocks per game	PPG	Points per game
TO	Turnovers per game	FG%	Field-goal percentage	3P%	3-point field-goal percentage	FT%	Free-throw percentage
**Bold**	Career best	°	League leader

==== Regular season ====
WNBA regular season statistics
Year	Team	GP	GS	MPG	FG%	3P%	FT%	RPG	APG	SPG	BPG	TO	PPG
1997	Cleveland	28°	1	21.0	40.2	**41.7**	71.4	2.9	0.9	0.8	0.1	1.9	8.2
1998	Cleveland	30°	21	22.8	46.4	35.0	75.3	3.2	1.3	1.1	0.1	1.7	9.5
1999	Cleveland	32°	8	26.7	43.4	27.8	76.9	3.8	1.6	1.3	**0.2**	2.1	10.8
2000	Cleveland	32°	**32**	29.6	**47.4**	31.1	68.1	4.3	2.0	0.9	0.1	1.9	11.0
2001	Cleveland	30	30	33.3	43.8	26.5	**79.3**	**5.5**	1.5	1.0	0.1	1.8	**13.5**
2002	Cleveland	32°	**32**	**34.2**	39.9	27.8	78.5	**5.5**	**2.3**	**1.4**	0.1	1.7	12.2
2003	Cleveland	**34**°	15	19.8	33.7	30.8	71.8	2.9	1.3	0.6	0.1	1.1	4.8
2004	Detroit	33	2	15.7	37.1	26.7	75.0	2.1	0.6	0.6	0.1	**0.8**	5.5
**Career**	8 years, 2 teams	251	141	25.3	42.0	29.9	75.3	3.7	1.4	1.0	0.1	1.6	9.4
**Career**	All-Star	3	1	15.0	45.0	0.0	66.7	3.7	1.3	0.3	0.0	0.7	7.3

==== Playoffs ====
WNBA playoff statistics
Year	Team	GP	GS	MPG	FG%	3P%	FT%	RPG	APG	SPG	BPG	TO	PPG
1998	Cleveland	3	0	21.7	45.8	**50.0**	**100.0**	4.0	0.3	0.0	0.0	1.0	9.0
2000	Cleveland	**6**	**6**	**34.5**	39.5	30.0	75.0	**7.2**	1.8	1.2	0.0	1.3	**13.8**
2001	Cleveland	3	3	34.3	**46.9**	33.3	**100.0**	6.0	**3.0**	0.3	**0.3**	1.0	12.0
2003	Cleveland	3	0	12.3	40.0	0.0	50.0	1.7	0.0	0.0	0.0	**0.7**	1.7
2004	Detroit	3	1	20.3	42.3	0.0	**100.0**	4.0	0.7	**1.3**	0.0	**0.7**	7.7
**Career**	5 years, 2 teams	18	10	26.3	42.2	29.6	83.3	5.0	1.3	0.7	0.1	1.0	9.7

=== College ===
Legend
GP	Games played	GS	Games started	MPG	Minutes per game
FG%	Field goal percentage	3P%	3-point field goal percentage	FT%	Free throw percentage
RPG	Rebounds per game	APG	Assists per game	SPG	Steals per game
BPG	Blocks per game	PPG	Points per game	**Bold**	Career high

Year	Team	GP	Points	FG%	3P%	FT%	RPG	APG	SPG	BPG	PPG
1991–92	Florida	28	420	**54.1%**	0.0%	**77.1%**	5.0	0.9	1.1	0.5	15.0
1992–93	Florida	29	438	47.2%	**25.0%**	66.2%	7.0	1.4	**2.2**	0.5	15.1
1993–94	Florida	28	520	51.4%	**25.0%**	68.0%	**10.1**	**1.8**	1.9	**0.7**	18.6
1994–95	Florida	**33**	623	43.6%	24.8%	69.2%	6.3	1.6	1.4	0.6	**18.9**
TOTALS	Florida	118	2001	48.3%	24.8%	70.1%	7.0	1.4	1.6	0.1	17.0

== USA Basketball ==
Jones represented the US at the 1995 World University Games held in Fukuoka, Japan, in August and September 1995. The team had a record of 5–1, securing the silver medal. The USA teams won early and reached a record of 5–0 when the USA beat Yugoslavia. In the semi-final game, the USA faced Russia. The team was behind much of the first half but managed to tie the game at the half. The USA broke the game open in the second half and won 101–74, with Frett contributing a double-double, 20 points and 13 rebounds. The gold medal match was against unbeaten Italy. The Italian team started strong, scoring 12 of the first 14 points of the contest. The USA took a small lead in the second half, but the team from Italy responded with a ten-point run, and won the game and the gold medal by a score of 73–65. Jones averaged 2.3 points per game.

== Professional career ==
The Cleveland Rockers selected Jones in the second round (thirteenth pick overall) of the 1997 WNBA draft. Her debut game was played on June 21, 1997, in a 56–76 loss to the Houston Comets where she recorded 8 points,2 rebounds, 1 assist and 1 block. Jones would go on to play for the Rockers for seven seasons (1997 - 2003) and made the All-Star team in three of those seasons (1999, 2000 and 2001). For the 1999 season, Jones was a bright spot on the Rockers' dark season, as the team finished 7 - 25 (which at the time became the 2nd worst W/L record in WNBA history) with Jones averaging 10.8 points and 3.8 rebounds.

Jones and the Rockers made the playoffs four times during Jones' tenure (1998, 2000, 2001 and 2003) but failed to reach the WNBA Finals all four times. Interestingly, she was also the only player to play for the Rockers throughout the team's existence. The Rockers franchise folded in 2003 due to lack of new ownership and Jones played for them every season from their inaugural season to their final season. In January 2004, the WNBA hosted a Dispersal Draft where every player that had a remaining contract with the Rockers would be drafted to a different team. Jones was not eligible to be drafted since she was an unrestricted free agent at the time, and she would sign with the Detroit Shock on February 17, 2004.

With the Shock, Jones played in 33 games and averaged 5.5 points and 2.1 rebounds. The team reached the playoffs with a 17–17 record, but were eliminated in the first round by the New York Liberty (2-1). This season with the Shock ended up being Jones last days in the NBA and Game 3 of that first round series against the Liberty was the final game of her career. That game was played on September 28, 2004, and although Jones produced a strong 13 points, 7 rebounds, 1 assist and 1 steal, the Shock lost the game 64 - 66.

Jones finished her WNBA career with 251 games played (141 starts) and averaged 9.4 points, 3.7 rebounds and 1.4 assists. She was named by SB Nation as the best #13 pick in WNBA history, and currently still has the most career points scored of any player drafted at that pick (2,353 career points).

== See also ==
- List of Florida Gators in the WNBA
- List of University of Florida alumni
