= Chasity Melvin =

American basketball player (born 1976)

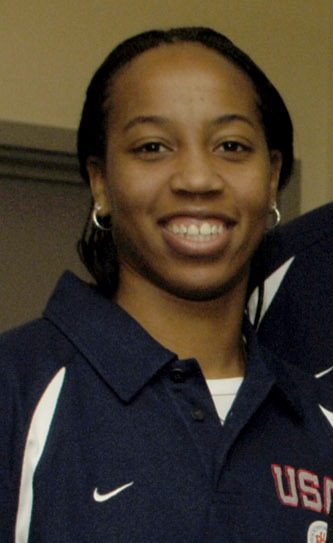
- Melvin in 2006

Personal information
- Born: May 3, 1976 (age 50) Roseboro, North Carolina, U.S.
- Listed height: 6 ft 3 in (1.91 m)
- Listed weight: 185 lb (84 kg)

Career information
- High school: Lakewood (Salemburg, North Carolina)
- College: NC State (1994–1998)
- WNBA draft: 1999: 1st round, 11th overall pick
- Drafted by: Cleveland Rockers
- Playing career: 1999–present
- Position: Power forward / center

Career history

Playing
- 1999–2003: Cleveland Rockers
- 2004–2007: Washington Mystics
- 2007–2008: Chicago Sky
- 2009–2010: Washington Mystics

Coaching
- 2021: Phoenix Mercury

Career highlights
- WNBA All-Star (2001); Kodak All-American (1998); 2× First-team All-ACC (1997, 1998); ACC Rookie of the Year (1995); ACC All-Freshman Team (1995)
- Stats at WNBA.com
- Stats at Basketball Reference

Chasity Melvin (born May 3, 1976) is a retired American professional basketball player, originally from Roseboro, North Carolina.

== Early life ==
Melvin attended Lakewood High School in Salemburg, North Carolina. In 1994, she helped lead the Lakewood women's basketball team to win the NCHSAA 1A state championship, where she was named the game MVP.

== College career ==
Melvin attended and played basketball for North Carolina State University from 1994 to 1998. In 1996–97, she was named a Kodak All-American. She led the Wolfpack to a Final Four appearance in her senior season and set an NCAA semifinal record by scoring 37 points in the Wolfpack's loss to Louisiana Tech on March 27, 1998.

== Professional career ==
A 6-foot-3-inch (1.91 m) forward, Melvin entered the WNBA in 1999, and played for the Cleveland Rockers, the Washington Mystics, and the Chicago Sky over twelve seasons in the league. She recorded WNBA career averages of 9.7 points per game and 5.4 rebounds per game. Melvin has also played professionally in Italy, Israel, Spain, Poland, Russia the ABL, and China.

During a game at the UIC Pavilion on August 15, 2007, Melvin's left eye was dislodged from its socket after Shameka Christon of the New York Liberty accidentally struck Melvin's face as the two were battling for a rebound. Melvin was treated at the University of Illinois-Chicago Medical Center, where her eye returned into its socket by itself. She was able to return to the arena to participate in Fan Appreciation Night activities after the game. Melvin suffered scratches to her cornea, but no skull fractures or vision loss.

Melvin played for Asia Aluminum Basketball Club in China during the 2008–09 WNBA off-season. She returned to the Mystics for the 2009 season; she had played there previously from 2004 to 2007.

Melvin joined the WUBA Southern Lady Generals in 2014. In 2019, Melvin went to Albania and Kosovo as a Sports Envoy for the U.S. State Department's Sport Diplomacy Office.

== Career statistics ==
Legend
GP	Games played	GS	Games started	MPG	Minutes per game	RPG	Rebounds per game
APG	Assists per game	SPG	Steals per game	BPG	Blocks per game	PPG	Points per game
TO	Turnovers per game	FG%	Field-goal percentage	3P%	3-point field-goal percentage	FT%	Free-throw percentage
**Bold**	Career best	°	League leader

=== WNBA ===
==== Regular season ====
Year	Team	GP	GS	MPG	FG%	3P%	FT%	RPG	APG	SPG	BPG	TO	PPG
1999	Cleveland	32	9	22.2	43.8	**100.0**	69.4	4.0	1.2	0.6	0.7	1.3	8.1
2000	Cleveland	32	32	28.3	47.1	14.3	73.0	5.4	**1.9**	0.9	0.6	1.9	11.7
2001	Cleveland	27	20	27.9	47.4	**100.0**	69.8	5.7	**1.9**	0.9	0.6	1.7	9.9
2002	Cleveland	32	32	**33.0**	46.4	50.0	68.7	6.0	1.8	0.9	0.6	2.3	12.5
2003	Cleveland	**34**	**34**	31.2	47.7	27.3	69.9	6.3	1.5	0.8	0.6	2.0	**13.1**
2004	Washington	**34**	16	24.3	40.6	0.0	76.6	3.9	1.1	0.4	0.5	1.5	8.6
2005	Washington	**34**	**34**	30.9	49.2	25.0	67.4	5.9	0.7	0.9	0.4	1.8	11.7
2006	Washington	**34**	**34**	29.5	**52.0**	0.0	65.6	6.6	1.3	1.0	0.8	1.8	11.9
2007	Washington	3	3	27.3	34.6	0.0	**84.2**	**6.7**	0.0	**2.0**	0.0	**0.7**	11.3
2007	Chicago	29	25	29.4	46.8	20.0	62.7	**6.7**	1.3	1.1	0.8	2.4	9.9
2008	Chicago	**34**	18	22.3	44.3	33.3	61.4	5.1	1.5	0.9	0.3	1.4	8.2
2009	Washington	**34**	33	22.2	44.7	0.0	54.1	4.6	1.1	1.0	**0.9**	1.5	5.9
2010	Washington	**34**	12	19.4	43.4	0.0	64.3	4.7	0.7	0.7	0.5	1.2	5.2
Career	12 years, 3 teams	393	302	26.6	46.3	28.6	67.8	5.4	1.3	0.9	0.6	1.7	9.7

==== Playoffs ====
Year	Team	GP	GS	MPG	FG%	3P%	FT%	RPG	APG	SPG	BPG	TO	PPG
2000	Cleveland	**6**	**6**	30.5	52.6	0.0	72.2	6.7	1.8	0.8	0.5	1.8	8.8
2001	Cleveland	3	2	27.0	50.0	0.0	72.7	4.0	**2.0**	0.7	0.7	2.0	8.0
2003	Cleveland	3	3	**34.7**	38.7	0.0	76.5	4.3	1.7	0.7	**1.3**	2.7	**16.7**
2004	Washington	3	3	**34.7**	41.9	0.0	71.4	**8.3**	**2.0**	0.3	**1.3**	0.7	13.7
2006	Washington	2	2	29.0	33.3	0.0	25.0	7.5	0.0	0.0	0.0	2.5	5.5
2009	Washington	2	2	22.5	58.3	0.0	**100.0**	3.0	2.0	**1.0**	0.5	3.5	8.5
2010	Washington	2	1	15.0	**80.0**	0.0	75.0	2.0	1.0	**1.0**	0.0	**0.5**	5.5
Career	7 years, 2 teams	21	19	28.8	46.6	0.0	72.6	5.5	1.6	0.7	0.7	1.9	9.9

=== College ===
Legend
GP	Games played	GS	Games started	MPG	Minutes per game
FG%	Field goal percentage	3P%	3-point field goal percentage	FT%	Free throw percentage
RPG	Rebounds per game	APG	Assists per game	SPG	Steals per game
BPG	Blocks per game	PPG	Points per game	**Bold**	Career high

Year	Team	GP	Points	FG%	3P%	FT%	RPG	APG	SPG	BPG	PPG
1994–95	NC State	31	508	**60.3%**	0.0%	56.4%	7.0	1.1	**1.5**	1.0	16.4
1995–96	NC State	30	489	56.2%	0.0%	53.7%	7.7	1.2	1.0	**1.8**	16.3
1996–97	NC State	31	500	58.4%	0.0%	**60.4%**	8.6	1.4	1.0	1.4	16.1
1997–98	NC State	**32**	**545**	57.9%	0.0%	57.8%	**9.5**	**2.6**	1.0	1.4	**17.0**
Total		124	2042	57.9%	0.0%	57.3%	8.2	1.6	1.3	1.2	16.5
