= Janice Lawrence Braxton =

American basketball player (born 1962)

Personal information
- Born: June 7, 1962 (age 64) Lucedale, Mississippi, U.S.
- Listed height: 6 ft 2.5 in (1.89 m)
- Listed weight: 161 lb (73 kg)

Career information
- High school: George County (Lucedale, Mississippi)
- College: Louisiana Tech (1980–1984)
- WNBA draft: 1997: Initial allocation round
- Drafted by: Cleveland Rockers
- Position: Forward
- Number: 8, 38

Career history
- 1997–1999: Cleveland Rockers

Career highlights
- Wade Trophy (1984); WBCA Player of the Year (1984); NCAA Tournament MOP (1982); 2× Kodak All-American (1983, 1984); 2× Mississippi Miss Basketball (1979, 1980)
- Stats at Basketball Reference
- Women's Basketball Hall of Fame
Medals
Women's basketball
Representing the United States
Olympic Games
Gold medal – first place	1984 Los Angeles	Team competition
Pan American Games
Gold medal – first place	1983 Venezuela	Team competition
Jones Cup
Gold medal – first place	1984 Taipei	Team competition
FIBA World Championship for Women
Silver medal – second place	1983 Rio de Janeiro	Team competition

Janice Faye Lawrence Braxton (née Lawrence, born June 7, 1962) is an American former professional women's basketball player. Born in Lucedale, Mississippi, she was inducted into the Women's Basketball Hall of Fame in 2006 and the Louisiana Sports Hall of Fame in 2005.

== College career ==
Braxton played college basketball for Louisiana Tech, where she helped lead the Lady Techsters to national championships in 1981 and 1982. While only a sophomore in 1982, she was the leading scorer in the NCAA tournament, and was named the tournament MVP. Braxton won the WBCA Player of the Year award in 1984.

=== Louisiana Tech statistics ===
Legend
GP	Games played	GS	Games started	MPG	Minutes per game
FG%	Field goal percentage	3P%	3-point field goal percentage	FT%	Free throw percentage
RPG	Rebounds per game	APG	Assists per game	SPG	Steals per game
BPG	Blocks per game	PPG	Points per game	**Bold**	Career high

Year	Team	GP	Points	FG%	FT%	RPG	PPG
1980–81	Louisiana Tech	34	507	NA		8.3	14.9
1981–82	Louisiana Tech	**36**	528	55.6%	**71.3%**	7.0	14.7
1982–83	Louisiana Tech	33	**685**	59.8%	63.5%	**9.1**	20.8
1983–84	Louisiana Tech	32	683	**61.9%**	71.0%	8.1	**21.3**
Career		135	2403	59.3%	68.3%	8.1	17.8

== USA Basketball ==
Braxton was a member of the 1983 Pan American Games team that won a gold medal in Venezuela.

Braxton was a member of the USA National team at the 1983 World Championships, held in Sao Paulo, Brazil. The team won six games, but lost two against the Soviet Union. In an opening round game, the USA team had a nine-point lead at halftime, but the Soviets came back to take the lead, and a final shot by the USA failed to drop, leaving the USSR team with a one-point victory 85–84. The USA team won their next four games, setting up the gold medal game against USSR. This game was also close, and was tied at 82 points each with six seconds to go in the game. Elena Chausova of the Soviet Union received the inbounds pass and hit the game winning shot in the final seconds, giving the USSR team the gold medal with a score of 84–82. The USA team earned the silver medal. Braxton averaged 8.9 points per game.

In 1984, the United States sent its National team to the 1984 William Jones Cup competition in Taipei, Taiwan, for pre-Olympic practice. The team easily beat each of the eight teams they played, winning by an average of just under 50 points per game. Braxton averaged 6.7 points per game.

She won a gold medal with the USA Women's Olympic basketball team at the 1984 Summer Olympics.

She was inducted into the Louisiana Tech University Athletic Hall of Fame in 1987. In 2006, Braxton was elected to the Women's Basketball Hall of Fame, located in Knoxville, Tennessee.

== Professional career ==
Braxton played for the New York team in the Women's American Basketball Association, a short-lived league in the mid-80's (not to be confused with WABA a league of the same name existing in 2002).

Braxton played 13 seasons in Europe with Vicenza, Messina and Parma in Italian League. The Vicenza team won four European Champions Cup while Braxton played for the team, scoring almost 23 points per game. She earned All-Star honors in 1997.

=== WNBA ===
She was selected in the initial player allocation of the 1997 WNBA draft to the Cleveland Rockers in the Women's National Basketball Association (WNBA). Her debut game was played on June 21, 1997, in a 56–76 loss to the Houston Comets. Braxton recorded 3 points, 3 rebounds, 2 assists and 2 steals playing for nearly 20 minutes. Braxton played for 3 seasons from 1997 to 1999 and she spent all three years playing for the Rockers. Her only time making the playoffs with the Rockers was during the 1998 season. Braxton started in all 30 games that season and helped the Rockers finish 20–10 (#1 in the Eastern Conference) as they matched up against the Phoenix Mercury in the Semi-Finals. Despite Braxton having great averages of 10.6 points, 6.3 rebounds and 2.0 assists in the playoffs series, Cleveland would lose 2–1 to the Mercury and be eliminated.

The 1999 season saw a massive downturn for the Rockers as they finished the season 7–25 with Braxton playing in less minutes per game than previous years and averaging less points, rebounds and assists across the board. Braxton's final WNBA game was played on August 21, 1999, in a 66–56 win over the New York Liberty where she recorded 7 points, 5 rebounds, 3 assists, 2 blocks and 1 steal.

In 2003, she joined the Cleveland Rockers as an assistant coach.

== Awards and honors ==
- 1982—NCAA Tournament MVP
- 1983—Kodak All-America
- 1984—Kodak All-America
- 1984—Wade Trophy

== Career statistics ==
Legend
GP	Games played	GS	Games started	MPG	Minutes per game	RPG	Rebounds per game
APG	Assists per game	SPG	Steals per game	BPG	Blocks per game	PPG	Points per game
TO	Turnovers per game	FG%	Field-goal percentage	3P%	3-point field-goal percentage	FT%	Free-throw percentage
**Bold**	Career best	°	League leader

=== Regular season ===
Year	Team	GP	GS	MPG	FG%	3P%	FT%	RPG	APG	SPG	BPG	TO	PPG
1997	Cleveland	25	24	**32.9**	.417	**.500**	**.768**	**7.6**	2.0	1.4	**1.1**	2.1	**11.5**
1998	Cleveland	**30**	**30**	28.0	**.495**	.333	.755	5.6	**2.5**	**1.7**	0.5	2.2	9.8
1999	Cleveland	26	21	18.3	.460	.125	.697	4.3	1.3	0.7	0.5	**1.3**	5.8
Career	3 years, 1 team	81	75	26.4	.458	.333	.748	5.8	1.9	1.3	0.7	1.9	9.0

=== Playoffs ===
Year	Team	GP	GS	MPG	FG%	3P%	FT%	RPG	APG	SPG	BPG	TO	PPG
1998	Cleveland	3	3	27.7	.385	.000	.857	6.3	2.0	0.7	0.0	2.3	10.7
