= 1998 Cleveland Rockers season =

- Head coach: Linda Hill-MacDonald
- Arena: Gund Arena

Results
- Record: 20–10 (.667)
- Place: 1st (Eastern)
- Playoff finish: Lost WNBA Semifinals (2-1) to Phoenix Mercury

The 1998 WNBA season was the 2nd for the Cleveland Rockers. The Rockers topped the Eastern Conference, but they were unable to reach the WNBA Finals, losing in the WNBA semifinals to the Phoenix Mercury.

== Transactions ==
=== Detroit Shock expansion draft ===
The following player was selected in the Detroit Shock expansion draft from the Cleveland Rockers:

Player	Nationality	School/Team/Country
Lynette Woodard	United States	Kansas

=== WNBA draft ===
Round	Pick	Player	Nationality	School/Team/Country
1	6	Cindy Blodgett	United States	Maine
2	16	Suzie McConnell Serio	United States	Penn State
3	26	Tanja Kostić	Sweden	Oregon State
4	36	Tammye Jenkins	United States	Georgia

=== Transactions ===
Date	Transaction
February 18, 1998	Lost Lynette Woodard to the Detroit Shock in the WNBA expansion draft
April 29, 1998	Drafted Cindy Blodgett, Suzie McConnell Serio, Tanja Kostić and Tammye Jenkins in the 1998 WNBA draft

== Roster ==
1998 Cleveland Rockers roster
Players
Coaches

Pos.	No.	Nat.	Name	Height	Weight	DOB	From	Yrs
G	41	(Australia)	Bevilaqua, Tully	5' 7" (1.7m)	145 lb (66kg)	1972-07-19		R
G	5	(United States)	Blodgett, Cindy	5' 9" (1.75m)	130 lb (59kg)	1975-12-23	Maine	R
F	8	(United States)	Braxton, Janice	6' 3" (1.91m)	178 lb (81kg)	1962-06-07	Louisiana Tech	1
F	34	(United States)	Brown, Rushia	6' 2" (1.88m)	175 lb (79kg)	1972-05-05	Furman	1
G	44	(United States)	Edwards, Michelle	5' 9" (1.75m)	150 lb (68kg)	1966-03-06	Iowa	1
F/C	13	(France)	Fijalkowski, Isabelle	6' 5" (1.96m)	200 lb (91kg)	1972-05-23	Colorado	1
G	31	(United States)	Johnson, Adrienne	5' 10" (1.78m)	154 lb (70kg)	1974-02-05	Ohio State	1
G	25	(United States)	Jones, Merlakia	5' 10" (1.78m)	147 lb (67kg)	1973-06-21	Florida	1
F	10	(Sweden)	Kostić, Tanja	6' 2" (1.88m)	163 lb (74kg)	1972-11-10	Oregon State	R
G	4	(United States)	McConnell-Serio, Suzie			1966-07-29	Penn State	R
F	6	(Czechoslovakia)	Němcová, Eva	6' 3" (1.91m)	178 lb (81kg)	1972-12-03		1
F/C	51	(United States)	Scott, Raegan	6' 3" (1.91m)	169 lb (77kg)	1975-08-12	Colorado	1

Head coach
(United States) Linda Hill-MacDonald (West Chester)
Assistant coaches
(United States) Mike Wilhelm

Legend

- (C) Team captain
- (DP) Unsigned draft pick
- (FA) Free agent
- (S) Suspended
- Injured

== Schedule ==
=== Regular season ===
1998 game log
Total: 20–10 (Home: 11–4; Road: 9–6)
June: 4–3 (Home: 3–1; Road: 1–2)

Game	Date	Team	Score	High points	High rebounds	High assists	Location Attendance	Record
1	June 11	New York	W 78–71	Janice Braxton (17)	Janice Braxton (6)	Suzie McConnell-Serio (10)	Gund Arena	1–0
2	June 15	@ Detroit	W 96–85	Janice Braxton (18)	Isabelle Fijalkowski (6)	Suzie McConnell-Serio (8)	The Palace of Auburn Hills	2–0
3	June 18	@ Houston	L 69–87	Janice Braxton (13)	Isabelle Fijalkowski (9)	Suzie McConnell-Serio (7)	Compaq Center	2–1
4	June 20	Detroit	W 68–66	Janice Braxton (17)	Janice Braxton (8)	Fijalkowski; McConnell-Serio (5)	Gund Arena	3–1
5	June 22	Utah	W 88–72	Janice Braxton (17)	Isabelle Fijalkowski (8)	Bevilaqua; Blodgett (6)	Gund Arena	4–1
6	June 23	@ New York	L 57–59	Rushia Brown (12)	Adrienne Johnson (8)	Tully Bevilaqua (4)	Madison Square Garden	4–2
7	June 27	Detroit	L 73–84	Isabelle Fijalkowski (25)	Janice Braxton (13)	Eva Němcová (5)	Gund Arena	4–3

July : 8–6 (Home: 6–2; Road: 2–4)

Game	Date	Team	Score	High points	High rebounds	High assists	Location Attendance	Record
8	July 1	@ Washington	W 92–80	Isabelle Fijalkowski (19)	Isabelle Fijalkowski (8)	Suzie McConnell-Serio (4)	MCI Center	5–3
9	July 2	Phoenix	L 61–76	Isabelle Fijalkowski (16)	Janice Braxton (8)	Suzie McConnell-Serio (12)	Gund Arena	5–4
10	July 6	Houston	L 64–78	Braxton; Jones (13)	Isabelle Fijalkowski (9)	Suzie McConnell-Serio (4)	Gund Arena	5–5
11	July 8	Washington	W 77–65	Eva Němcová (15)	Eva Němcová (7)	Suzie McConnell-Serio (6)	Gund Arena	6–5
12	July 10	@ Phoenix	L 60–76	Janice Braxton (13)	Janice Braxton (8)	Suzie McConnell-Serio (5)	America West Arena	6–6
13	July 12	@ Los Angeles	L 66–87	Janice Braxton (13)	Janice Braxton (7)	Suzie McConnell-Serio (10)	Great Western Forum	6–7
14	July 14	@ Sacramento	W 61–58	Eva Němcová (15)	Braxton; Fijalkowski (5)	Suzie McConnell-Serio (9)	ARCO Arena	7–7
15	July 16	New York	W 60–51	Isabelle Fijalkowski (15)	Michelle Edwards (7)	Suzie McConnell-Serio (7)	Gund Arena	8–7
16	July 18	@ Detroit	L 57–72	Michelle Edwards (13)	Isabelle Fijalkowski (7)	Braxton; Fijalkowski; Jones; Němcová; McConnell-Serio (1)	The Palace of Auburn Hills	8–8
17	July 19	Charlotte	W 85–69	Merlakia Jones (19)	Janice Braxton (9)	Suzie McConnell-Serio (8)	Gund Arena	9–8
18	July 25	Utah	W 69–59	Isabelle Fijalkowski (24)	Isabelle Fijalkowski (8)	Edwards; McConnell-Serio (6)	Gund Arena	10–8
19	July 27	Los Angeles	W 83–67	Eva Němcová (15)	Isabelle Fijalkowski (9)	Eva Němcová (9)	Gund Arena	11–8
20	July 29	Sacramento	W 75–67	Isabelle Fijalkowski (17)	Isabelle Fijalkowski (8)	Michelle Edwards (7)	Gund Arena	12–8
21	July 30	@ Charlotte	L 64–79	Michelle Edwards (24)	Braxton; Fijalkowski (7)	Isabelle Fijalkowski (5)	Charlotte Coliseum	12–9

August : 8–1 (Home: 2–1; Road: 6–0)

Game	Date	Team	Score	High points	High rebounds	High assists	Location Attendance	Record
22	August 1	@ Houston	W 74–71 (OT)	Isabelle Fijalkowski (19)	Merlakia Jones (10)	Michelle Edwards (7)	Compaq Center	13–9
23	August 4	@ Sacramento	W 72–60	Isabelle Fijalkowski (17)	Isabelle Fijalkowski (11)	Suzie McConnell-Serio (7)	ARCO Arena	14–9
24	August 6	@ Utah	W 79–69	Isabelle Fijalkowski (22)	Braxton; Fijalkowski (7)	Suzie McConnell-Serio (5)	Delta Center	15–9
25	August 8	Charlotte	W 65–58	Eva Němcová (18)	Isabelle Fijalkowski (6)	Braxton; McConnell-Serio (4)	Gund Arena	16–9
26	August 10	Phoenix	L 80–82 (2OT)	Eva Němcová (19)	Isabelle Fijalkowski (12)	Suzie McConnell-Serio (8)	Gund Arena	16–10
27	August 12	@ Washington	W 75–55	Braxton; Fijalkowski (13)	Janice Braxton (6)	McConnell-Serio; Němcová (3)	MCI Center	17–10
28	August 14	@ Charlotte	W 85–72	Suzie McConnell-Serio (18)	Brown; Fijalkowski; Němcová (5)	Suzie McConnell-Serio (7)	Charlotte Coliseum	18–10
29	August 15	Washington	W 85–72	Suzie McConnell-Serio (19)	Isabelle Fijalkowski (8)	McConnell-Serio; Němcová (7)	Gund Arena	19–10
30	August 17	@ New York	W 70–64	Isabelle Fijalkowski (18)	Isabelle Fijalkowski (9)	Suzie McConnell-Serio (6)	Madison Square Garden	20–10

1998 season schedule

=== Playoffs ===
1998 playoff game log
Semifinal vs. Phoenix Mercury
Lost Series: 1–2

Game	Date	Team	Score	High points	High rebounds	High assists	Location Attendance	Record
1	August 22	@ Phoenix	L 68–78	Isabelle Fijalkowski (20)	Isabelle Fijalkowski (9)	Edwards; Němcová (4)	America West Arena	0–1
2	August 24	Phoenix	W 67–66	Michelle Edwards (18)	Janice Braxton (10)	Suzie McConnell-Serio (9)	Gund Arena	1–1
3	August 25	Phoenix	L 60–71	Isabelle Fijalkowski (17)	Isabelle Fijalkowski (11)	Eva Němcová (5)	Gund Arena	1–2

1998 playoff schedule

=== Season standings ===
Eastern Conference	W	L	PCT	Conf.	GB
Cleveland Rockers ^{x}	20	10	.667	12–4	–
Charlotte Sting ^{x}	18	12	.600	11–5	2.0
New York Liberty ^{o}	18	12	.600	8–8	2.0
Detroit Shock ^{o}	17	13	.567	8–8	3.0
Washington Mystics ^{o}	3	27	.100	1–15	17.0

== Statistics ==
Legend
GP	Games played	GS	Games started	MPG	Minutes per game	RPG	Rebounds per game
APG	Assists per game	SPG	Steals per game	BPG	Blocks per game	PPG	Points per game
FG%	Field-goal percentage	3P%	3-point field-goal percentage	FT%	Free-throw percentage	TO	Turnovers per game
PF	Fouls per game		Team leader		League leader

=== Regular season ===
Player	GP	GS	MPG	FG%	3P%	FT%	RPG	APG	SPG	BPG	PPG
Eva Němcová	30	30	32.4	.466	.452	.893	3.7	2.2	1.1	0.7	11.9
Suzie McConnell-Serio	28	28	31.5	.455	.408	.729	2.2	6.4	1.8	0.2	8.6
Isabelle Fijalkowski	28	23	28.8	.547	.400	.821	6.9	2.1	0.6	1.0	13.7
Janice Braxton	30	30	28.0	.495	.333	.755	5.6	2.5	1.7	0.5	9.8
Michelle Edwards	23	9	23.2	.417	.324	.620	2.3	2.8	1.0	0.0	7.7
Merlakia Jones	30	21	22.8	.464	.350	.753	3.2	1.3	1.1	0.1	9.5
Rushia Brown	30	7	17.4	.460	.000	.776	3.1	0.9	1.1	0.5	6.5
Tully Bevilagua	11	2	11.5	.571	.333	.667	0.9	2.1	1.1	0.2	1.9
Adrienne Johnson	29	0	11.4	.457	.424	.722	1.7	0.5	0.2	0.1	4.6
Cindy Blodgett	22	0	8.4	.288	.270	.625	0.6	0.8	0.4	0.0	2.9
Raegan Scott	22	0	7.6	.368	.000	.833	1.3	0.3	0.1	0.2	1.7
Tanja Kostić	5	0	6.0	.667	N/A	.500	0.4	0.4	0.0	0.0	1.0

^{‡}Waived/Released during the season
^{†}Traded during the season
^{≠}Acquired during the season

== Awards and honors ==
- Suzie McConnell Serio, WNBA Newcomer of the Year Award
- Isabelle Fijalkowski, WNBA Peak Performer
- Suzie McConnell Serio, WNBA Sportsmanship Award
