= 2001 Cleveland Rockers season =

- Head coach: Dan Hughes
- Arena: Gund Arena

Results
- Record: 22–10 (.688)
- Place: 1st (Eastern)
- Playoff finish: Lost First Round (2-1) to Charlotte Sting

Media
- Television: WUAB (UPN 43); Fox Sports Net Ohio

The 2001 WNBA season was the 5th season for the Cleveland Rockers. The Rockers topped the Eastern Conference with the best record in franchise history, but their season ended shortly in the playoffs, losing in the first round to eventual conference champion Charlotte Sting.

== Transactions ==
=== WNBA draft ===
Round	Pick	Player	Nationality	School/Team/Country
1	11	Penny Taylor	Australia	Dandenong Rangers (Australia)
2	27	Jaynetta Saunders	United States	Texas A&M
3	43	Angelina Wolvert	United States	Oregon
4	59	Erin Batth	United States	Clemson

=== Transactions ===
Date	Transaction
April 20, 2001	Drafted Penny Taylor, Jaynetta Saunders, Angelina Wolvert and Erin Batth in the 2001 WNBA draft
April 30, 2001	Signed Jessica Zinobile, Kim Williams, Rhonda Blades and Rhonda Smith
May 8, 2001	Waived Kim Williams and Rhonda Smith
May 11, 2001	Waived Rhonda Blades
May 22, 2001	Waived Erin Batth
May 27, 2001	Traded Jaynetta Saunders to the Phoenix Mercury in exchange for a 2002 2nd Round Pick
May 27, 2001	Traded a 2002 3rd Round Pick to the Detroit Shock in exchange for Jennifer Rizzotti
May 27, 2001	Waived Jessica Zinobile
May 27, 2001	Suspended contracts of Ann Wauters and Rushia Brown
June 1, 2001	Waived Angelina Wolvert
June 16, 2001	Waived Adia Barnes
July 10, 2001	Waived Vicki Hall
July 12, 2001	Waived Paige Sauer

== Roster ==
2001 Cleveland Rockers roster
Players
Coaches

Pos.	No.	Nat.	Name	Height	Weight	DOB	From	Yrs
F	23	(Portugal)	Andrade, Mery	6' 0" (1.83m)	169 lb (77kg)	1975-12-31	Old Dominion	2
G	11	(United States)	Bader Binford, Tricia	5' 4" (1.63m)	125 lb (57kg)	1973-02-26	Boise State	3
F	32	(United States)	Barnes, Adia	5' 11" (1.8m)	165 lb (75kg)	1977-02-03	Arizona	3
F	34	(United States)	Brown, Rushia	6' 2" (1.88m)	175 lb (79kg)	1972-05-05	Furman	4
G	30	(United States)	Darling, Helen	5' 6" (1.68m)	164 lb (74kg)	1978-08-29	Penn State	1
F	42	(United States)	Hall, Vicki	6' 1" (1.85m)	180 lb (82kg)	1969-10-03	Texas	1
C	41	(The Bahamas)	Johns Kimbrough, Pollyanna	6' 3" (1.91m)	165 lb (75kg)	1975-11-06	Michigan	2
G	25	(United States)	Jones, Merlakia	5' 10" (1.78m)	147 lb (67kg)	1973-06-21	Florida	4
F/C	44	(United States)	Melvin, Chasity	6' 3" (1.91m)	185 lb (84kg)	1976-05-03	NC State	2
F	6	(Czechoslovakia)	Němcová, Eva	6' 3" (1.91m)	178 lb (81kg)	1972-12-03		4
G	21	(United States)	Rizzotti, Jennifer	5' 6" (1.68m)	146 lb (66kg)	1974-05-15	Connecticut	2
C	31	(United States)	Sauer, Paige	6' 5" (1.96m)	200 lb (91kg)	1977-12-08	Connecticut	1
F	14	(Australia)	Taylor, Penny	6' 1" (1.85m)	165 lb (75kg)	1981-05-24		R
C	12	(Belgium)	Wauters, Ann	6' 4" (1.93m)	193 lb (88kg)	1980-10-12		1
F/C	40	(United States)	Wolvert, Angelina	6' 3" (1.91m)		1978-12-08	Oregon	R

Head coach
(United States) Dan Hughes (Muskingum)
Assistant coaches
(United States) Lisa Boyer

Legend

- (C) Team captain
- (DP) Unsigned draft pick
- (FA) Free agent
- (S) Suspended
- Injured

== Schedule ==
=== Regular season ===
2001 game log
Total: 22–10 (Home: 14–2; Road: 8–8)
May: 1–0 (Home: 1–0; Road: 0–0)

Game	Date	Team	Score	High points	High rebounds	High assists	Location Attendance	Record
1	May 31	Washington	W 69–34	Merlakia Jones (17)	Pollyanna Johns Kimbrough (10)	Chasity Melvin (5)	Gund Arena	1–0

June : 9–4 (Home: 5–0; Road: 4–4)

Game	Date	Team	Score	High points	High rebounds	High assists	Location Attendance	Record
2	June 2	@ Sacramento	L 65–70	Penny Taylor (19)	Jones; Melvin (7)	Andrade; Taylor (4)	ARCO Arena	1–1
3	June 5	@ Los Angeles	L 50–58	Merlakia Jones (18)	Merlakia Jones (12)	Helen Darling (8)	Staples Center	1–2
4	June 7	New York	W 67–49	Jones; Melvin (13)	Merlakia Jones (8)	Merlakia Jones (6)	Gund Arena	2–2
5	June 9	Indiana	W 86–76	Chasity Melvin (22)	Brown; Jones (6)	Chasity Melvin (5)	Gund Arena	3–2
6	June 12	@ Portland	L 62–67	Penny Taylor (11)	Merlakia Jones (7)	Andrade; Jones (4)	Rose Garden	3–3
7	June 14	@ Seattle	W 58–36	Chasity Melvin (16)	Chasity Melvin (10)	Mery Andrade (6)	KeyArena	4–3
8	June 16	Miami	W 70–53	Merlakia Jones (18)	Chasity Melvin (11)	Andrade; Jones (5)	Gund Arena	5–3
9	June 17	@ Washington	W 57–55	Merlakia Jones (17)	Chasity Melvin (12)	Mery Andrade (6)	MCI Center	6–3
10	June 22	Los Angeles	W 74–70	Merlakia Jones (26)	Chasity Melvin (7)	Helen Darling (4)	Gund Arena	7–3
11	June 24	@ Miami	W 54–35	Chasity Melvin (11)	Merlakia Jones (9)	Jennifer Rizzotti (4)	American Airlines Arena	8–3
12	June 26	Portland	W 61–57	Merlakia Jones (20)	Taylor; Wauters (6)	Helen Darling (5)	Gund Arena	9–3
13	June 27	@ Orlando	W 65–41	Chasity Melvin (12)	Hall; Melvin; Taylor (5)	Helen Darling (8)	TD Waterhouse Centre	10–3
14	June 30	@ Charlotte	L 55–58	Rushia Brown (16)	Merlakia Jones (7)	Darling; Jones; Melvin (3)	Charlotte Coliseum	10–4

July : 10–2 (Home: 7–1; Road: 3–1)

Game	Date	Team	Score	High points	High rebounds	High assists	Location Attendance	Record
15	July 1	Minnesota	W 52–47	Merlakia Jones (13)	Merlakia Jones (6)	Helen Darling (6)	Gund Arena	11–4
16	July 6	@ Utah	L 69–73	Jones; Melvin (13)	Chasity Melvin (8)	Mery Andrade (4)	Delta Center	11–5
17	July 8	@ Houston	W 63–53	Helen Darling (18)	Rushia Brown (11)	Helen Darling (7)	Compaq Center	12–5
18	July 10	Seattle	W 59–53	Rushia Brown (18)	Rushia Brown (8)	Brown; Darling; Rizzotti (4)	Gund Arena	13–5
19	July 11	@ Indiana	W 76–58	Darling; Taylor (14)	Pollyanna Johns Kimbrough (5)	Jennifer Rizzotti (7)	Conseco Fieldhouse	14–5
20	July 13	Phoenix	W 69–61	Merlakia Jones (22)	Merlakia Jones (11)	Darling; Rizzotti (3)	Gund Arena	15–5
21	July 19	New York	W 65–60	Ann Wauters (19)	Brown; Jones (9)	Helen Darling (6)	Gund Arena	16–5
22	July 21	Charlotte	W 56–41	Ann Wauters (15)	Brown; Jones (6)	Helen Darling (4)	Gund Arena	17–5
23	July 25	Miami	W 52–48 (OT)	Rushia Brown (15)	Ann Wauters (10)	Mery Andrade (5)	Gund Arena	18–5
24	July 27	Indiana	L 63–67	Rushia Brown (20)	Jones; Taylor (7)	Mery Andrade (7)	Gund Arena	18–6
25	July 28	@ Detroit	W 57–50	Merlakia Jones (12)	Ann Wauters (8)	Helen Darling (2)	The Palace of Auburn Hills	19–6
26	July 30	Orlando	W 65–46	Helen Darling (16)	Rushia Brown (8)	Helen Darling (5)	Charlotte Coliseum	20–6

August : 2–4 (Home: 1–1; Road: 1–3)

Game	Date	Team	Score	High points	High rebounds	High assists	Location Attendance	Record
27	August 4	@ New York	W 58–43	Ann Wauters (14)	Merlakia Jones (11)	Rushia Brown (3)	Madison Square Garden	21–6
28	August 7	@ Orlando	L 67–74	Merlakia Jones (20)	Rushia Brown (7)	Mery Andrade (5)	TD Waterhouse Centre	21–7
29	August 8	Detroit	W 73–66	Jones; Taylor (14)	Jones; Wauters (7)	Andrade; Melvin (4)	Gund Arena	22–7
30	August 10	Charlotte	L 53–55	Merlakia Jones (15)	Ann Wauters (10)	Ann Wauters (5)	Gund Arena	22–8
31	August 12	@ Washington	L 49–57	Chasity Melvin (13)	Chasity Melvin (10)	Helen Darling (4)	MCI Center	22–9
32	August 14	@ Detroit	L 65–76	Penny Taylor (21)	Ann Wauters (8)	Mery Andrade (5)	The Palace of Auburn Hills	22–10

2001 season schedule

=== Playoffs ===
2001 playoff game log
First round vs. Charlotte Sting
Lost Series: 1–2

Game	Date	Team	Score	High points	High rebounds	High assists	Location Attendance	Record
1	August 16	@ Charlotte	L 46–53	Ann Wauters (12)	Merlakia Jones (7)	Merlakia Jones (7)	Charlotte Coliseum	0–1
2	August 18	Charlotte	W 69–51	Merlakia Jones (19)	Merlakia Jones (7)	Darling; Rizzotti (6)	Gund Arena	1–1
3	August 20	Charlotte	L 64–72	Merlakia Jones (13)	Helen Darling (5)	Helen Darling (10)	Gund Arena	1–2

2001 playoff schedule

=== Season standings ===
Eastern Conference	W	L	PCT	Conf.	GB
Cleveland Rockers ^{x}	22	10	.688	15–6	–
New York Liberty ^{x}	21	11	.656	13–8	1.0
Miami Sol ^{x}	20	12	.625	14–7	2.0
Charlotte Sting ^{x}	18	14	.563	15–6	4.0
Orlando Miracle ^{o}	13	19	.406	9–12	9.0
Indiana Fever ^{o}	10	22	.313	7–14	12.0
Detroit Shock ^{o}	10	22	.313	7–14	12.0
Washington Mystics ^{o}	10	22	.313	4–17	12.0

== Statistics ==
Legend
GP	Games played	GS	Games started	MPG	Minutes per game	RPG	Rebounds per game
APG	Assists per game	SPG	Steals per game	BPG	Blocks per game	PPG	Points per game
FG%	Field-goal percentage	3P%	3-point field-goal percentage	FT%	Free-throw percentage	TO	Turnovers per game
PF	Fouls per game		Team leader		League leader

=== Regular season ===
Player	GP	GS	MPG	FG%	3P%	FT%	RPG	APG	SPG	BPG	PPG
Merlakia Jones	30	30	33.3	.438	.265	.793	5.5	1.5	1.0	0.1	13.5
Mery Andrade	32	32	27.9	.339	.200	.667	2.7	3.1	1.6	0.3	4.8
Chasity Melvin	27	20	27.9	.474	1.000	.698	5.7	1.9	0.9	0.6	9.9
Ann Wauters	24	14	25.9	.569	.000	.800	4.8	1.5	0.7	0.5	9.8
Rushia Brown	30	24	25.3	.518	1.000	.730	4.4	1.2	1.5	0.3	8.3
Helen Darling	32	32	24.3	.355	.329	.764	2.4	3.4	1.1	0.1	6.1
Penny Taylor	32	0	17.5	.382	.301	.783	3.5	1.4	1.1	0.3	7.2
Vicki Hall	14	6	16.1	.409	.318	.500	2.4	0.6	0.1	0.4	4.6
Jennifer Rizzotti	32	0	14.9	.382	.384	.636	0.9	1.6	0.8	0.1	3.7
Eva Němcová	8	2	14.1	.342	.200	.625	1.3	1.0	0.3	0.6	4.3
Pollyanna Johns Kimbrough	18	0	6.6	.444	N/A	.444	1.7	0.2	0.0	0.1	1.6
Tricia Bader Binford	19	0	6.0	.400	.385	N/A	0.6	0.6	0.3	0.0	1.1
Angelina Wolvert	1	0	5.0	.333	N/A	N/A	1.0	0.0	0.0	0.0	2.0
Paige Sauer	2	0	2.0	.333	N/A	N/A	1.0	0.0	0.0	0.5	1.0
Adia Barnes	3	0	1.0	1.000	N/A	N/A	0.3	0.0	0.0	0.0	0.7

^{‡}Waived/Released during the season
^{†}Traded during the season
^{≠}Acquired during the season
