= Helen Darling =

American basketball player (born 1978)

Personal information
- Born: August 29, 1978 (age 48) Columbus, Ohio, U.S.
- Listed height: 5 ft 6 in (1.68 m)
- Listed weight: 164 lb (74 kg)

Career information
- High school: Brookhaven (Columbus, Ohio)
- College: Penn State (1996–2000)
- WNBA draft: 2000: 2nd round, 17th overall pick
- Drafted by: Cleveland Rockers
- Playing career: 2000–2010
- Position: Guard
- Number: 30

Career history
- 2000–2003: Cleveland Rockers
- 2004: Minnesota Lynx
- 2005–2006: Charlotte Sting
- 2007–2010: San Antonio Silver Stars

Career highlights
- Kodak All-American (2000); Third-team All-American – AP (2000); Big Ten co-Player of the Year (2000); Frances Pomeroy Naismith Award (2000); Chicago Tribune Silver Basketball (2000); Big Ten Tournament MOP (2000); 2× First-team All-Big Ten (1999, 2000); NCAA season assists leader (2000)
- Stats at WNBA.com
- Stats at Basketball Reference
Medals
Women's basketball
Representing USA
World University Games
Gold medal – first place	1999 Palma de Mallorca	Team Competition

Helen Marie Darling (born August 29, 1978) is an American former professional basketball player who played in the Women's National Basketball Association (WNBA).

== Early life ==
Darling is the daughter of Patricia Smith and Donald Darling. She has three brothers Donald, Ronald and Dewand Darling and one sister, Alicia Smith. She is also the mother of triplets two boys Ja-Juan, Jalen and a girl Nevaeh, born on April 13, 2002.

Darling attended Brookhaven High School (Columbus, Ohio) where she was named a High School All-American by the WBCA. She participated in the WBCA High School All-America Game in 1995, scoring six points.

Over the course of her college career at Penn State, Darling averaged 10.3 points, 5.3 rebounds, 6.3 assists and 2.49 steals in 126 games and is the only player in Penn State history to amass 1,000 points, 500 rebounds and 600 assists for her career. Darling is also the only player in Penn State history to earn Big Ten Player of the Year honors. A four-year starting point guard, she helped lead the Penn State Lady Lions to their first and only Final Four appearance in 2000. Darling earned her degree in education from Penn State in December 2001. She received the Frances Pomeroy Naismith Award from the Women's Basketball Coaches Association as the best senior player under 5 ft 8 in (1.7 m) in 2000.

=== Penn State statistics ===
Legend
GP	Games played	GS	Games started	MPG	Minutes per game	FG%	Field goal percentage	3P%	3-point field goal percentage
FT%	Free throw percentage	RPG	Rebounds per game	APG	Assists per game	SPG	Steals per game	BPG	Blocks per game
TO	Turnovers per game	PPG	Points per game	**Bold**	Career high	*	Led Division I

Year	Team	GP	Points	FG%	3P%	FT%	RPG	APG	SPG	BPG	PPG
1996-97	Penn State	27	210	30.2%	0.0%	70.9%	4.4	4.4	1.7	0.0	7.8
1997-98	Penn State	34	343	39.6%	26.7%	64.9%	5.2	4.9	0.6	0.0	10.1
1998-99	Penn State	30	373	39.1%	14.3%	**76.4%**	**5.8**	7.5	2.6	0.1	**12.4**
1999-00	Penn State	**35**	**368**	**39.6%**	**28.8%**	77.5%	5.7	***7.8**	**2.9**	**0.1**	10.5
Career		126	1294	37.7%	25.6%	72.6%	5.3	6.2	2.5	0.0	10.3

== USA Basketball ==
Darling played on the team presenting the US at the 1999 World University Games held in Palma de Mallorca, Spain. The team had a 4–2 record and earned the silver medal. Darling scored 2.5 points per game.

== WNBA career ==
=== Cleveland Rockers ===
On April 25, 2000, Darling was drafted by the Cleveland Rockers in the second round (No. 17 overall) of the 2000 WNBA draft. In her rookie season, Darling played in all 32 regular season games recording 4.8 points, 2.0 assists and 1.15 steals. For the playoffs she averaged 5.5 points, 3.3 rebounds and 2.2 assists in six Rockers playoff games. During the 2001 WNBA season, Darling was one of only two Rockers players to start all 32 regular season games helping the Rockers earn the No.1 seed in the Eastern Conference. Darling finished the season averaging 6.1 points, 2.4 rebounds, 3.4 assists and 1.1 steals. In the three games against Charlotte during the playoffs, Darling averaged 6.0 points, 6.3 assists, 3.7 rebounds and 2.3 steals.

During the 2002 WNBA season, Darling did not play due to pregnancy. Her triplets (two boys Ja-Juan and Jalen; daughter Nevaeh) were, born on April 13, 2002.

During the 2003 WNBA season, Darling started all 34 games for Cleveland finishing the season with 128 assists, the second-highest single-season total in Rockers history and averaging 4.1 points, 3.8 assists, 2.6 rebounds in 24.5 minutes.

=== Minnesota Lynx ===
After the 2003 WNBA season, the Cleveland Rockers decided to fold, a dispersal draft was held. The Minnesota Lynx selected Darling with their seventh pick.

During the 2004 WNBA season, Darling played in 33 games and started in the last 22 games of the regular season for the Lynx averaging 4.2 points, 3.5 assists and 2.0 rebounds in 21.4 minutes. Helping Minnesota tie the Seattle Storm for 3rd seed in the Western Conference.

=== Charlotte Sting ===
After only one season with the Lynx, Darling was traded by Minnesota along with the Lynx's second-round pick (24th overall) in the 2005 WNBA Draft to the Charlotte Sting in exchange for the Sting's second-round pick (17th overall) in the 2005 WNBA Draft.

During the 2005 WNBA season, Darling played 31 games for Charlotte, starting the last 11, as a starter Darling, averaged 7.0 points and 4.5 assists in 31.0 minutes, compared to 1.5 points and 1.3 assists in 17.6 minutes off the bench. Missed only one game due to a left hamstring strain.

During the 2006 WNBA season, Darling started all 29 regular season games, averaging 4.7 points, 3.0 assists and 1.13 steals per game. (At 5-foot-6, Darling was the Sting's shortest player—and three inches taller than her new coach, Charlotte basketball icon Muggsy Bogues, who was 5'3".)

=== San Antonio Silver Stars ===
After a disappointing last-place performance and poor attendance for the Sting, the team folded and a dispersal draft was held. The San Antonio Silver Stars selected Darling with their fourth pick. Reuniting Darling with Coach Dan Hughes who drafted her from Penn state for the Cleveland Rockers in 2000.

During the 2007 WNBA season, Darling started 19 regular-season games and appeared in 33 recordings 103 assists and 45 steals. On August 7 Darling earned her 1,000th career point in a game against the Washington Mystics.

== Off the court ==
Darling has been very active in every community for which she plays so much so that she received the WNBA Community Assistant Award in 2003 for her participation in the community. Darling has also served as a national spokesperson for the March of Dimes. Darling has recently published her first children's book entitled Hide 'n Seek Mondays. The book is the first in a series of seven. Helen is a mother of three, triplets, sons JaJuan and Jalen and daughter Neveah.

== WNBA career statistics ==
=== Regular season ===
Year	Team	GP	GS	MPG	FG%	3P%	FT%	RPG	APG	SPG	BPG	TO	PPG
2000	Cleveland	32	0	17.3	.313	.342	.738	2.0	2.0	1.2	0.2	2.1	4.8
2001	Cleveland	32	32	24.3	.355	.329	.764	2.4	3.4	1.1	0.1	2.2	6.1
2003	Cleveland	34	34	24.5	.308	.324	.732	2.6	3.8	1.1	'0.2	2.2	4.1
2004	Minnesota	33	22	21.4	.331	.218	.667	2.0	3.5	0.9	0.1	2.2	4.2
2005	Charlotte	31	11	19.4	.307	.313	.741	1.5	2.7	1.3	0.0	1.6	3.5
2006	Charlotte	29	29	21.2	.370	.383	.691	2.0	2.8	1.2	0.1	2.5	5.4
2007	San Antonio	33	19	20.7	.383	.366	.771	2.1	3.1	1.4	0.0	1.6	4.1
2008	San Antonio	31	14	18.7	.268	.200	.789	2.4	1.7	1.1	0.1	1.5	3.5
2009	San Antonio	34	13	18.9	.248	.295	.673	1.8	2.9	0.9	0.1	1.2	3.1
2010	San Antonio	33	1	11.8	.300	.273	.647	1.0	1.4	0.6	0.0	1.0	1.9
Career	10 years, 4 teams	322	175	19.8	.322	.302	.721	2.0	2.8	1.1	0.1	1.8	4.1

=== Playoffs ===
Year	Team	GP	GS	MPG	FG%	3P%	FT%	RPG	APG	SPG	BPG	TO	PPG
2000	Cleveland	6	0	17.7	.321	.385	.714	3.3	2.2	1.2	0.0	1.0	5.5
2001	Cleveland	3	3	26.7	.185	.333	.833	3.7	6.3	2.3	0.3	1.7	6.0
2003	Cleveland	3	3	27.7	.154	.125	1.000	4.0	4.3	2.0	0.0	3.3	3.0
2004	Minnesota	2	2	22.0	.222	.667	.500	1.5	1.5	1.5	0.0	5.5	3.5
2007	San Antonio	5	5	24.2	.467	.529	.833	3.4	3.8	1.2	0.0	2.6	8.4
2008	San Antonio	6	0	8.8	.385	.286	.000	1.2	0.8	0.5	0.0	1.2	2.0
2009	San Antonio	3	0	11.3	.200	.000	.500	1.3	1.0	0.3	0.0	0.3	1.3
2010	San Antonio	2	0	7.0	.500	.000	.000	0.5	0.0	0.0	0.0	1.0	1.0
Career	8 years, 3 teams	30	13	17.8	.307	.386	.750	2.5	2.5	1.1	0.0	1.8	4.2
