= Montana State Bobcats women's basketball =

American college basketball team

Montana State Bobcats
2026–27 Montana State Bobcats women's basketball team
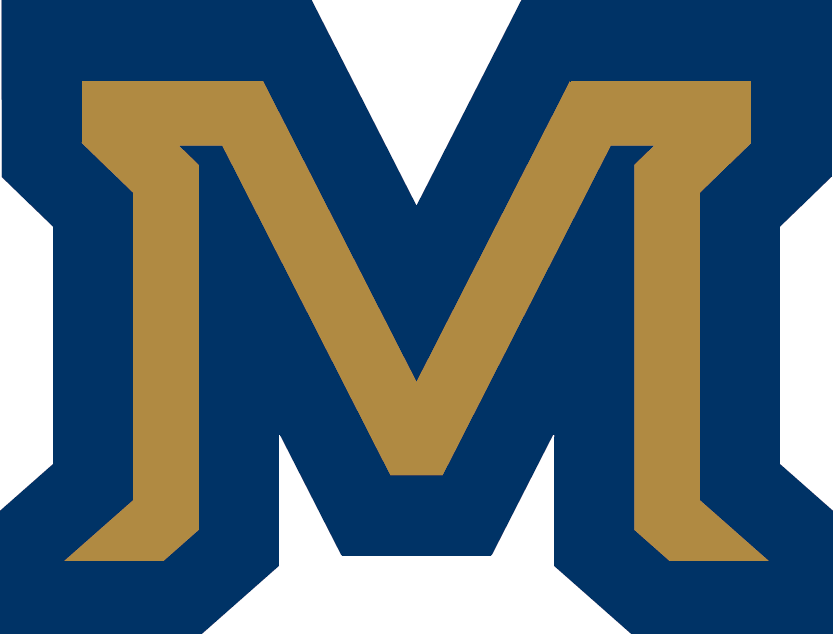
- University: Montana State University
- Head coach: Tricia Binford (22nd season)
- Location: Bozeman, Montana
- Arena: Worthington Arena at Brick Breeden Fieldhouse (capacity: 7,250)
- Conference: Big Sky
- Nickname: Bobcats
- Colors: Blue and gold

NCAA Division I tournament appearances
- 1993, 2017, 2022, 2025

Conference tournament champions
- 1993, 2017, 2022, 2025

Conference regular-season champions
- 2016, 2017, 2020, 2023, 2025

Uniforms
Home	Away	Alternate

The Montana State Bobcats women's basketball team represents Montana State University, located in Bozeman, Montana. The school's team currently competes in the Big Sky Conference. They play their home games at Worthington Arena. The Bobcats are currently coached by Tricia Binford, who has served as the team's head coach since 2005 and is the winningest coach in team history.

== History ==
Montana State launched its women's basketball program in 1976 under coach Susan Miller, with the team losing its inaugural game to Flathead Community College. The Bobcats joined the Northwest Basketball League in 1978 before transferring to the Mountain West Athletic Conference in 1982. In 1988, Montana State made its first postseason appearance, being selected for the Women's National Invitation Tournament and finishing last in the eight-team bracket. Ahead of the 1988–89 season, the team transferred to the Big Sky Conference.

In 1993, the Bobcats earned their first berth to the NCAA Tournament under head coach Judy Spoelstra, with the season also marking the team's first Big Sky Tournament Championship. In 1999, former Bobcats stand-out Cass Bauer-Bilodeau became the first Montana State player to join the WNBA, signing with the Charlotte Sting.

In 2005, the team hired Tricia Binford, a former WNBA player and then-assistant at Utah State. After a 3−23 record in her first season, Binford has led the Bobcats to two more NCAA appearances and has not posted a losing record since 2007.

== Postseason appearances ==
=== NCAA tournament results ===
The Bobcats have appeared in the NCAA Division I women's basketball tournament four times. They have a combined record of 0–4.

Year	Seed	Round	Opponent	Result
1993	10	First round	(7) Washington	L 51−80
2017	14	First round	(3) Washington	L 63−91
2022	16	First Round	(1) Stanford	L 37−78
2025	13	First Round	(4) Ohio State	L 51−71

=== WNIT results ===
The Bobcats have appeared in the Women's National Invitation Tournament one time. They have a record of 0−1.

Year	Round	Opponent	Result
2016	First Round	Utah	61−95
2026	Second Round; Super 16	San Francisco; Portland	69–53; TBD
