= Eva Horáková =

Czech basketball player

Personal information
- Born: 3 December 1972 (age 53) Prague, Czechoslovakia
- Listed height: 6 ft 3 in (1.91 m)
- Listed weight: 178 lb (81 kg)

Career information
- WNBA draft: 1997: 1st round, 4th overall pick
- Drafted by: Cleveland Rockers
- Playing career: 1997–2001
- Position: Forward
- Number: 6

Career history
- 1997–2001: Cleveland Rockers

Career highlights
- All-WNBA First Team (1997); All-WNBA Second Team (1998)

Career WNBA statistics
- Points: 1,306 (11.8 ppg)
- Rebounds: 386 (3.5 rpg)
- Assists: 215 (1.9 apg)
- Stats at Basketball Reference
Medals
Representing Czech Republic
Women's basketball
European Championships
Gold medal – first place	2005 Turkey	Team competition

Eva Horáková, née Němcová (born 3 December 1972), is a Czech former basketball player.

== Life and career ==
The youngest of three children of Jiřina Němcová and Zdeněk Němec, she began her basketball career at the age of 18. She played for the Czech Republic national team in 1992 Summer Olympics, which finished at sixth place.

On 28 April 1997 Němcová was the 4th overall pick in the 1997 WNBA draft, being selected by the Cleveland Rockers. Her debut game was played on 21 June 1997 in a 56 - 76 loss to the Houston Comets where she recorded 5 points, 2 assists and 1 block. Němcová would go on to play 111 games in her WNBA career (from 1997 to 2001), all 111 of them being with the Cleveland Rockers.

She was named a member of the All-WNBA first team and second team in 1997 and 1998 respectively. During the 2000 WNBA season, she set a league record by making 66 consecutive free throws. She was the ninth WNBA player to score 1,000 career points.

Her final WNBA game ever was played on 21 July 2001 in a 56 - 41 victory over the Charlotte Sting. In her final game, Němcová played for 12 minutes and missed all four of her field goal attempts, but was still able to record 1 point, 1 assist and 2 rebounds.

In 2005, Němcová won a gold medal with the Czech national team at the Eurowomen tournament.

== Career statistics ==
Legend
GP	Games played	GS	Games started	MPG	Minutes per game	RPG	Rebounds per game
APG	Assists per game	SPG	Steals per game	BPG	Blocks per game	PPG	Points per game
TO	Turnovers per game	FG%	Field-goal percentage	3P%	3-point field-goal percentage	FT%	Free-throw percentage
**Bold**	Career best	°	League leader

=== Regular season ===
Year	Team	GP	GS	MPG	FG%	3P%	FT%	RPG	APG	SPG	BPG	TO	PPG
1997	Cleveland	28	28	**33.7**	**.473**	.435°	.855	**3.9**	**2.4**	**1.4**	0.3	2.8	**13.7**
1998	Cleveland	30	**30**	32.4	.468	**.452**°	.893	3.7	2.2	1.1	**0.7**	2.1	12.0
1999	Cleveland	**31**	28	29.8	.419	.366	**.984**°	3.7	1.6	1.0	**0.7**	2.6	11.1
2000	Cleveland	14	14	31.6	.409	.408	.917	2.9	1.6	1.1	0.6	1.9	13.2
2001	Cleveland	8	2	14.1	.342	.200	.625	1.3	1.0	0.3	0.6	**0.8**	4.3
Career	5 years, 1 team	111	102	30.6	.442	.402	.897	3.5	1.9	1.1	0.6	2.3	11.8

=== Playoffs ===
Year	Team	GP	GS	MPG	FG%	3P%	FT%	RPG	APG	SPG	BPG	TO	PPG
1998	Cleveland	3	3	30.7	.321	.200	1.000	3.0	4.7	0.7	0.7	2.7	7.0
