= 2000 Cleveland Rockers season =

- Head coach: Dan Hughes
- Arena: Gund Arena

Results
- Record: 17–15 (.531)
- Place: 2nd (Eastern)
- Playoff finish: Lost Conference Finals (2-1) to New York Liberty

The 2000 WNBA season was the 4th season for the Cleveland Rockers.

== Transactions ==
=== Portland Fire expansion draft ===
The following players were selected in the Portland Fire expansion draft from the Cleveland Rockers:

Player	Nationality	School/Team/Country
Jamila Wideman	United States	Stanford
Alisa Burras	United States	Louisiana Tech

=== WNBA draft ===
Round	Pick	Player	Nationality	School/Team/Country
1	1	Ann Wauters	Belgium	Valenciennes (France)
2	17	Helen Darling	United States	Penn State
3	33	Monique Morehouse	United States	New England Blizzard
4	49	Sophie Von Saldern	West Germany	BTV Wuppertal (Germany)

=== Transactions ===
Date	Transaction
October 19, 1999	Hired Dan Hughes as Head Coach
December 15, 1999	Lost Jamila Wideman and Alisa Burras to the Portland Fire in the WNBA expansion draft
April 25, 2000	Drafted Ann Wauters, Helen Darling, Monique Morehouse and Sophie Von Saldern in the 2000 WNBA draft
May 4, 2000	Signed Beverly Williams, Pollyanna Johns Kimbrough and Vicki Hall
May 23, 2000	Waived Beverly Williams
June 11, 2000	Traded Michelle Edwards to the Seattle Storm in exchange for Nina Bjedov
July 7, 2000	Signed Adia Barnes to a 7-day contract

== Roster ==
2000 Cleveland Rockers roster
Players
Coaches

Pos.	No.	Nat.	Name	Height	Weight	DOB	From	Yrs
F	23	(Portugal)	Andrade, Mery	6' 0" (1.83m)	169 lb (77kg)	1975-12-31	Old Dominion	1
G	11	(United States)	Bader Binford, Tricia	5' 4" (1.63m)	125 lb (57kg)	1973-02-26	Boise State	2
F	32	(United States)	Barnes, Adia	5' 11" (1.8m)	165 lb (75kg)	1977-02-03	Arizona	2
F	34	(United States)	Brown, Rushia	6' 2" (1.88m)	175 lb (79kg)	1972-05-05	Furman	3
G	30	(United States)	Darling, Helen	5' 6" (1.68m)	164 lb (74kg)	1978-08-29	Penn State	R
G	44	(United States)	Edwards, Michelle	5' 9" (1.75m)	150 lb (68kg)	1966-03-06	Iowa	3
F	42	(United States)	Hall, Vicki	6' 1" (1.85m)	180 lb (82kg)	1969-10-03	Texas	R
C	41	(The Bahamas)	Johns Kimbrough, Pollyanna	6' 3" (1.91m)	165 lb (75kg)	1975-11-06	Michigan	1
G	25	(United States)	Jones, Merlakia	5' 10" (1.78m)	147 lb (67kg)	1973-06-21	Florida	3
G	4	(United States)	McConnell-Serio, Suzie			1966-07-29	Penn State	2
F/C	28	(United States)	Melvin, Chasity	6' 3" (1.91m)	185 lb (84kg)	1976-05-03	NC State	1
F	6	(Czechoslovakia)	Němcová, Eva	6' 3" (1.91m)	178 lb (81kg)	1972-12-03		3
C	12	(Belgium)	Wauters, Ann	6' 4" (1.93m)	193 lb (88kg)	1980-10-12		R

Head coach
(United States) Dan Hughes (Muskingum)
Assistant coaches
(United States) Lisa Boyer

Legend

- (C) Team captain
- (DP) Unsigned draft pick
- (FA) Free agent
- (S) Suspended
- Injured

== Schedule ==
=== Regular season ===
2000 game log
Total: 17–15 (Home: 13–3; Road: 4–12)
May: 0–1 (Home: 0–0; Road: 0–1)

Game	Date	Team	Score	High points	High rebounds	High assists	Location Attendance	Record
1	May 31	@ Minnesota	L 62-73	Eva Němcová (20)	Rushia Brown (5)	Bader Binford; McConnell-Serio (5)	Target Center	0–1

June: 7–5 (Home: 5–2; Road: 2–3)

Game	Date	Team	Score	High points	High rebounds	High assists	Location Attendance	Record
2	June 3	Washington	W 72-49	Chasity Melvin (19)	Chasity Melvin (7)	Darling; Němcová (3)	Gund Arena	1–1
3	June 5	@ Charlotte	W 69-53	Eva Němcová (16)	Rushia Brown (9)	Melvin; McConnell-Serio (3)	Charlotte Coliseum	2–1
4	June 7	Orlando	W 83-79 (OT)	Eva Němcová (23)	Chasity Melvin (7)	Helen Darling (7)	Gund Arena	3–1
5	June 10	Seattle	W 61-49	Ann Wauters (12)	Hall; Melvin (5)	Suzie McConnell-Serio (6)	Gund Arena	4–1
6	June 12	@ Indiana	W 83-70	Merlakia Jones (15)	Chasity Melvin (8)	Mery Andrade (3)	Conseco Fieldhouse	5–1
7	June 16	Detroit	L 81-93	Chasity Melvin (28)	Ann Wauters (5)	Chasity Melvin (7)	Gund Arena	5–2
8	June 17	@ Miami	L 48-55	Chasity Melvin (11)	Chasity Melvin (7)	McConnell-Serio; Melvin (4)	American Airlines Arena	5–3
9	June 19	Sacramento	W 81-70	Eva Němcová (21)	Andrade; Brown (4)	Merlakia Jones (6)	Gund Arena	6–3
10	June 22	@ Orlando	L 64-77	Helen Darling (15)	Darling; Melvin (5)	Darling; McConnell-Serio (4)	TD Waterhouse Centre	6–4
11	June 24	Minnesota	L 57-60	Eva Němcová (15)	Merlakia Jones (6)	Suzie McConnell-Serio (4)	Gund Arena	6–5
12	June 25	Phoenix	W 64-61	Brown; Melvin; Němcová (13)	Rushia Brown (9)	Suzie McConnell-Serio (7)	Gund Arena	7–5
13	June 28	@ Portland	L 69-80	Merlakia Jones (16)	Chasity Melvin (10)	Andrade; McConnell-Serio (9)	Rose Garden	7–6

July: 8–6 (Home: 6–1; Road: 2–5)

Game	Date	Team	Score	High points	High rebounds	High assists	Location Attendance	Record
14	July 1	@ Los Angeles	L 67-75	Chasity Melvin (18)	Suzie McConnell-Serio (5)	Suzie McConnell-Serio (6)	Great Western Forum	7–7
15	July 3	New York	W 66-65 (OT)	Vicki Hall (17)	Andrade; Hall; Jones (7)	McConnell-Serio; Melvin (4)	Gund Arena	8–7
16	July 7	@ Miami	L 46-49	Mery Andrade (10)	Brown; Wauters (6)	Suzie McConnell-Serio (5)	American Airlines Arena	8–8
17	July 8	@ Charlotte	W 80-59	Rushia Brown (24)	Merlakia Jones (6)	Helen Darling (7)	Charlotte Coliseum	9–8
18	July 10	Charlotte	W 72-65	Chasity Melvin (21)	Chasity Melvin (6)	Mery Andrade (6)	Gund Arena	10–8
19	July 12	Orlando	W 74-72 (OT)	Mery Andrade (17)	Ann Wauters (6)	Darling; Jones; McConnell-Serio (4)	Gund Arena	11–8
20	July 15	Indiana	W 79-55	Merlakia Jones (13)	Ann Wauters (8)	Andrade; Brown; Melvin (4)	Gund Arena	12–8
21	July 20	Houston	L 56-74	Chasity Melvin (15)	Chasity Melvin (9)	Rushia Brown (4)	Gund Arena	12–9
22	July 22	Miami	W 76-47	Mery Andrade (13)	Merlakia Jones (8)	Suzie McConnell-Serio (5)	Gund Arena	13–9
23	July 24	@ Phoenix	L 57-67	Ann Wauters (14)	Ann Wauters (8)	Suzie McConnell-Serio (3)	America West Arena	13–10
24	July 26	@ Utah	L 77-84	Merlakia Jones (18)	Andrade; Melvin (7)	Chasity Melvin (5)	Delta Center	13–11
25	July 28	Washington	W 80-60	Vicki Hall (19)	Ann Wauters (9)	Rushia Brown (5)	Gund Arena	14–11
26	July 29	@ New York	L 67-81	Chasity Melvin (16)	Rushia Brown (10)	Suzie McConnell-Serio (4)	Madison Square Garden	14–12
27	July 31	@ Detroit	W 76-65	Helen Darling (17)	Chasity Melvin (10)	Andrade; McConnell-Serio (3)	The Palace of Auburn Hills	15–12

August: 2–3 (Home: 2–0; Road: 0–3)

Game	Date	Team	Score	High points	High rebounds	High assists	Location Attendance	Record
28	August 3	Utah	W 74-71	Merlakia Jones (19)	Melvin; Wauters (8)	Suzie McConnell-Serio (6)	Gund Arena	16–12
29	August 4	@ Indiana	L 75-87	Mery Andrade (18)	Merlakia Jones (7)	Suzie McConnell-Serio (4)	Conseco Fieldhouse	16–13
30	August 6	Washington	W 77-60	Rushia Brown (16)	Chasity Melvin (9)	Suzie McConnell-Serio (7)	Gund Arena	17–13
31	August 8	@ New York	L 44-57	Merlakia Jones (21)	Mery Andrade (7)	Mery Andrade (4)	Madison Square Garden	17–14
32	August 9	@ Washington	L 48-60	Brown; McConnell-Serio (12)	Merlakia Jones (7)	Chasity Melvin (3)	MCI Center	17–15

=== Playoffs ===
2000 playoff game log
First round vs. Orlando Miracle
Won Series: 2–1

Game	Date	Team	Score	High points	High rebounds	High assists	Location Attendance	Series
1	August 11	@ Orlando	L 55–62	Merlakia Jones (18)	Brown; Jones (6)	Rushia Brown (4)	TD Waterhouse Centre	0–1
2	August 13	Orlando	W 63–54	Darling; Jones (15)	Chasity Melvin (10)	Suzie McConnell-Serio (6)	Gund Arena	1–1
3	August 15	Orlando	W 72–43	Ann Wauters (12)	Hall; Jones (7)	Suzie McConnell-Serio (7)	Gund Arena	2–1

Conference Finals vs. New York Liberty
Lost Series: 1–2

Game	Date	Team	Score	High points	High rebounds	High assists	Location Attendance	Series
1	August 17	New York	W 56–43	Rushia Brown (18)	Chasity Melvin (9)	Suzie McConnell-Serio (5)	Gund Arena	1–0
2	August 20	@ New York	L 45–51	Merlakia Jones (18)	Merlakia Jones (12)	Helen Darling (3)	Madison Square Garden	1–1
3	August 21	@ New York	L 67–81	Jones; McConnell-Serio (13)	Chasity Melvin (9)	Helen Darling (4)	Madison Square Garden	1–2

2000 playoff schedule

=== Season standings ===
Eastern Conference	W	L	PCT	Conf.	GB
New York Liberty ^{x}	20	12	.625	14–7	–
Cleveland Rockers ^{x}	17	15	.531	13–8	3.0
Orlando Miracle ^{x}	16	16	.500	13–8	4.0
Washington Mystics ^{x}	14	18	.438	13–8	6.0
Detroit Shock ^{o}	14	18	.438	10–11	6.0
Miami Sol ^{o}	13	19	.406	9–12	7.0
Indiana Fever ^{o}	9	23	.281	7–14	11.0
Charlotte Sting ^{o}	8	24	.250	5–16	12.0

== Statistics ==
Legend
GP	Games played	GS	Games started	MPG	Minutes per game	RPG	Rebounds per game
APG	Assists per game	SPG	Steals per game	BPG	Blocks per game	PPG	Points per game
FG%	Field-goal percentage	3P%	3-point field-goal percentage	FT%	Free-throw percentage	TO	Turnovers per game
PF	Fouls per game		Team leader		League leader

=== Regular season ===
Player	GP	GS	MPG	FG%	3P%	FT%	RPG	APG	SPG	BPG	PPG
Eva Němcová	14	14	31.6	.409	.408	,917	2.9	1.6	1.1	0.6	13.2
Merlakia Jones	32	32	29.6	.474	.311	.681	4.3	2.0	0.9	0.1	11.0
Chasity Melvin	32	32	28.3	.471	.143	.730	5.4	1.9	0.9	0.6	11.7
Mery Andrade	32	18	24.9	.456	.360	.750	3.0	2.3	1.3	0.3	8.3
Rushia Brown	30	22	22.6	.497	.500	.846	4.1	1.5	1.3	0.4	8.4
Suzie McConnell-Serio	32	32	22.0	.414	.392	.760	1.6	3.7	0.5	0.0	5.4
Ann Wauters	32	0	18.7	.523	.000	.741	4.0	1.2	0.7	0.8	6.2
Vicki Hall	32	10	18.0	.373	.238	.647	2.9	0.8	0.5	0.3	4.7
Helen Darling	32	0	17.4	.313	.342	.738	2.0	2.0	1.2	0.2	4.8
Tricia Bader Binsford	25	0	8.0	.354	.333	.833	0.4	0.8	0.7	0.0	1.9
Michelle Edwards	3	0	5.7	.400	.000	N/A	0.7	0.3	0.0	0.0	2.7
Pollyanna Johns Kimbrough	12	0	4.8	.500	N/A	.583	1.2	0.2	0.0	0.1	1.4
Adia Barnes	5	0	3.6	.600	.000	.500	0.4	0.8	0.0	0.0	1.6

^{‡}Waived/Released during the season
^{†}Traded during the season
^{≠}Acquired during the season
