= Michelle Edwards (basketball) =

American basketball player (born 1966)

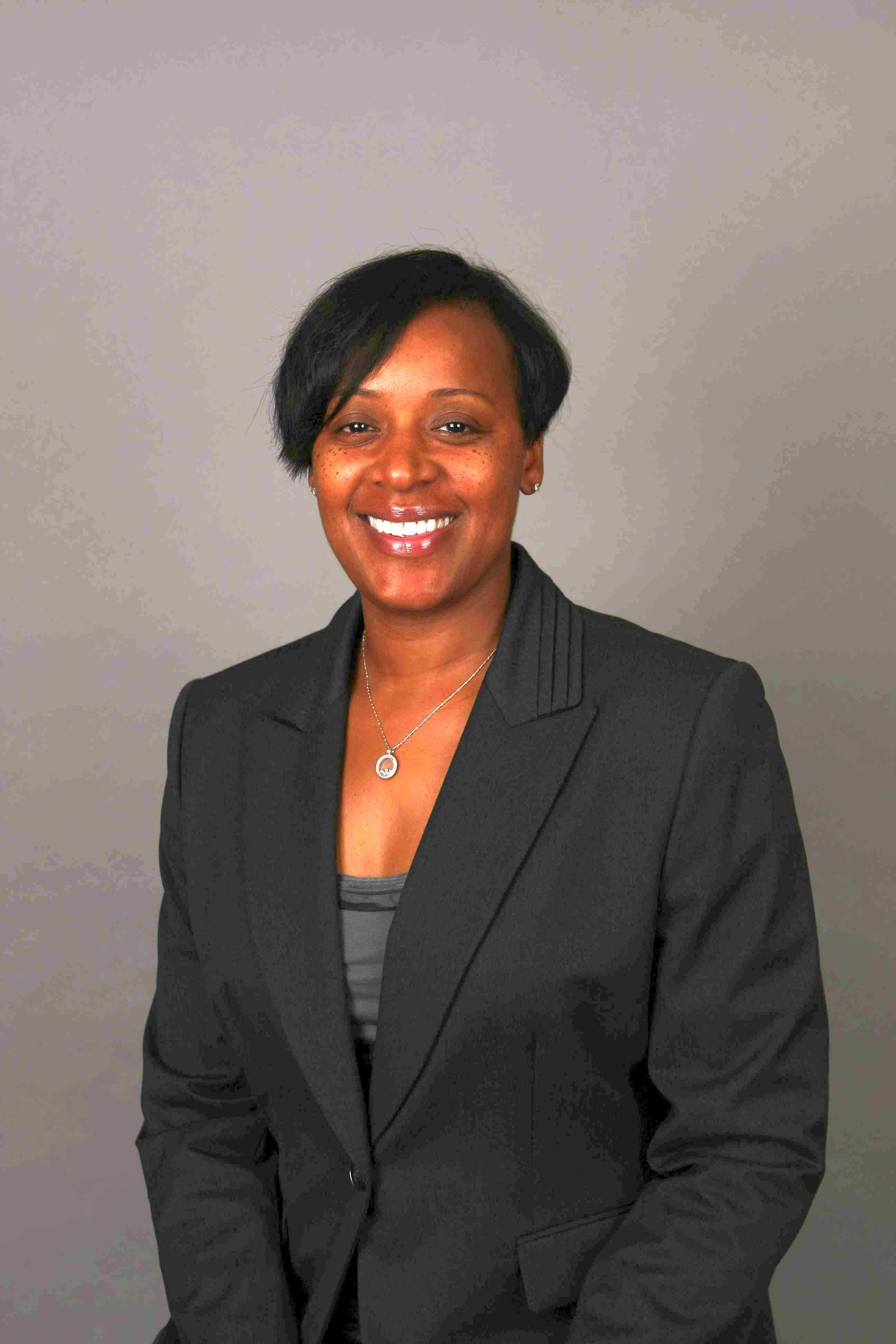

Illinois Fighting Illini
- Title: Assistant coach
- League: Big Ten Conference

Personal information
- Born: March 6, 1966 (age 60) Boston, Massachusetts, U.S.
- Listed height: 5 ft 9 in (1.75 m)
- Listed weight: 150 lb (68 kg)

Career information
- High school: Cathedral (Boston, Massachusetts)
- College: Iowa (1984–1988)
- WNBA draft: 1997: Initial allocation round
- Drafted by: Cleveland Rockers
- Position: Guard
- Number: 44
- Coaching career: 2004–2005, 2019–present

Career history

Playing
- 1997–2000: Cleveland Rockers
- 2000–2001: Seattle Storm

Coaching
- 2004–2005: Rutgers (assistant)
- 2019–present: Illinois (assistant)

Career highlights
- WBCA Player of the Year (1988); All-American – Kodak, USBWA (1988); Big Ten Player of the Year (1988); Chicago Tribune Silver Basketball (1988); 3× First-team All-Big Ten (1986–1988); No. 30 retired by Iowa Hawkeyes
- Stats at Basketball Reference
- Women's Basketball Hall of Fame
Medals
Women's basketball
Representing the United States
Pan American Games
Bronze medal – third place	1991 Havana	Team

Michelle Edwards (born March 6, 1966) is an American retired professional women's basketball player. She was a member of the United States women's national basketball team, that claimed the bronze medal at the 1991 Pan American Games in Havana, Cuba. Edwards was inducted into the Women's Basketball Hall of Fame in 2014.

Edwards was born and raised in Boston, Massachusetts.

Allocated to the Cleveland Rockers in the 1997 WNBA draft, the 5'9" guard out of the University of Iowa played for Cleveland and the Seattle Storm during her career. She also coached at Rutgers University.

== Early years ==
Unlike many notable basketball players, Edwards did not pick up the game at a young age. She was athletic, but her court of choice was a tennis court. She also skied, and dreamed of becoming the first black Olympic racer, although a case of frostbite cooled her interest in skiing. She spent a lot of time with her older brother Rodney, visiting a local park. He would go to the basketball court, but Edwards usually stopped to play with other girls where the swings were located. As she became a teenager, she started noticing boys, and would head over to the basketball court, not to play, but just to watch.

At first, she was too shy to join in, but eventually she did and soon was challenging some of the boys to one-on-one contests. She didn't always win, but she won more than she lost. Her skill soon earned her a nickname "Ice" because of her cool moves.

Edwards played high school basketball for Cathedral High in Boston, where she would score over 2000 points in her high school career, the first girl in Massachusetts history to reach that level. Her career earned her a spot in the high school Hall of Fame

While in high school she was noticed by Alfreda Harris, a Boston educator who had founded the Shelburne Center in Roxbury Massachusetts, place where Edwards played. Harris would later go on to become the first female head coach at the university of Massachusetts, Boston campus, and later would be inducted into their Hall of Fame. Harris noticed Edwards, and persuaded her to join a local AAU basketball team. College coaches learned about Edwards, and both Virginia and USC showed interest. Virginia sent a young assistant, Geno Auriemma to recruit her.

== College career ==
C. Vivian Stringer had cultivated a relationship with Harris while Stringer was at Cheyney State. This relationship continued, even after Stringer moved to take the head coaching position in Iowa. A women interviewing for an assistant coaching position told Stringer about a player she had seen in the Boston area. Stringer had no contact information, and started calling the high school, even though it was summer, trying to contact her. One day, she reached a janitor. She asked if he knew Edwards and he responded, "Who, Ice? Are you kidding me? That girl is the 'truth'." He explained that her coach was Alfreda Harris, so Stringer called Harris. She wasn't sure that Harris would remember her, but she did, and responded, "It's about time, Stringer. She's only the best damn player in America." Stringer began to recruit Edwards. On a recruiting visit, Edwards was embarrassed to admit she didn't know where Iowa was, so Stringer pulled out a map to show her. Stringer convinced her to enroll at Iowa. She was sympathetic, as she had not known where Iowa was, confusing it with Idaho, when Stringer had first been approached for the job.

Stringer had taken over a program at Iowa that had produced losing records for the prior three years. In Stringer's first season 1983–84, the record improved to 17–10. Edwards was one of the first recruits, and joined Stringer in her second year at Iowa. The team would go 20–8 in her freshman year, and improved that record each of the four years Edwards was at Iowa. The team finished second in the Big Ten in her freshman and sophomore years, then in a tie for first place as a junior, and sole possession of first place in her senior year.

In her freshman year, Iowa played Ohio State. The Ohio State team was unbeaten in conference play, while Iowa had just a single loss. The game was at Carver–Hawkeye Arena which had 15,500 seats, but over 20,000 showed up. They had to close the doors and turn away many fans, but the turnstiles recorded 22,157. a record number of fans to watch a women's basketball game at the time. Fans sat in the aisles, and the fire marshal sent a letter of reprimand to Christine Grant, who was then the director of women's athletics at Iowa. The letter still hangs prominently on Grant's wall. Ohio State won the game 56–47, but it is the attendance record that the two coaches remember. At Stringer's press conference, when she was announced as the new coach, she promised she would sell out the arena, which prompted audible snickers among the reporters. Edwards recalls missing a layup badly, because she was trying too hard. Coach Stringer consoled her, saying to her"'Do you see that picture? That is how intense that game was and that is the level of play we need to operate on every time we hit the floor."

In Edward's senior year, Iowa agreed to play in the Burger King/Orange Bowl Classic, held in Miami, Florida on 28–30 December 1987. The opening game was against Auburn, ranked among the top ten teams in the nation. Iowa won the game 73–69, which set up a game the next day against Virginia, also ranked in the top ten. The Hawkeyes beat Virginia 75–59, which set up a game the following day against Texas. The Longhorns were ranked first in the country, had Clarissa Davis, who had won national Player of the Year honors the previous year, and would go on to win National Player of the Year and Wade Trophy honors in 1989. Texas also had Beverly Williams, a Kodak Al_American. Coach Stringer was very concerned about how to convince her team that they could defeat Texas. She spent the whole night working on a pre-game speech, which would include references to a woman who swam the English Channel with no arms, and Glenn Cunningham (athlete), who set records for the mile run after he had been told that a childhood burn incident would not let him walk again. She talked about faith and a woman who was able to lift a car to save a child. She closed by pointing to the black blackboard, and declared it was green. The entire team was caught up in her passion and agreed that it really was green. After the team prayer, the team headed to the court, and defeated the number one team in the country. The following week, Iowa was ranked number one in the country 75–65.

Edwards was the leading scorer for her team in her sophomore, junior and senior years, scoring a total of 1821 points. She has the third highest scoring total among all Iowa players, and her 235 steals is also third best. She had 431 career assists, which is the second best in school history.

=== Iowa statistics ===
Legend
GP	Games played	GS	Games started	MPG	Minutes per game
FG%	Field goal percentage	3P%	3-point field goal percentage	FT%	Free throw percentage
RPG	Rebounds per game	APG	Assists per game	SPG	Steals per game
BPG	Blocks per game	PPG	Points per game	**Bold**	Career high

Year	Team	GP	Points	FG%	3P%	FT%	RPG	APG	SPG	BPG	PPG
1985	Iowa	26	268	49.8%	NA	57.1%	4.6	NA	NA	NA	10.3
1986	Iowa	29	368	49.7%	NA	**75.7%**	3.2	3.4	NA	NA	12.7
1987	Iowa	**31**	564	53.7%	NA	74.1%	3.8	4.0	NA	NA	18.2
1988	Iowa	**31**	**621**	**58.0%**	0.0%	70.0%	**4.8**	**4.5**	**2.9**	**0.3**	**20.0**
Career		117	1821	53.5%	0.0%	69.9%	4.1	3.1	0.8	0.1	15.6

== USA Basketball ==
Edwards played with the USA team at the 1991 Pan American Games. The team finished with a record of 4–2, but managed to win the bronze medal. The USA team lost a three-point game to Brazil, then responded with wins over Argentina and Cuba, earning a spot in the medal round. The next game was a rematch against Cuba, and this time the team from Cuba won a five-point game. The USA beat Canada easily to win the bronze. Edwards averaged 4.7 points per game.

== Professional career ==
Two years after she graduated, the school honored her by retiring her jersey. Although she appreciated it at the time, the honor did not sink in until years later, when she reflected on all the players that have played at Iowa, and she realized she is the only one to have her jersey retired.

After graduation, there were no major professional options for women in the United States. She wanted to play basketball, so decided to head to Italy to play for one of the club teams. Edwards had mixed feelings and cried on her trip over to Italy. However, she ended up play for nine seasons, earning All-Star Game MVP of the Italian League on three occasions. Over the nine years, she played for club teams Faenza, Pistoia, Ferrara and Pavia.

=== WNBA ===
Being selected by the Cleveland Rockers in the initial player allocation of the 1997 WNBA draft, Edwards debut game was played on June 21, 1997 in a 56 - 76 loss to the Houston Comets where she recorded 7 points, 2 rebounds, 2 assists and 3 steals. She would play for the Rockers for three years, averaging 8.1 points, 2.5 rebounds and 3.1 assists for the team.

Edwards was traded to the Seattle Storm on June 11, 2000 for Nina Bjedov. Speaking on the trade, then Head Coach of the Rockers, Dan Hughes stated "Michelle Edwards has meant a lot to this franchise both on the court and off. She has been with the team since the beginning. We owe her the opportunity to be somewhere where she will play". The trade happened after only playing 3 games for the Rockers in the 2000 season. Edwards finished the 2000 season with the Storm, playing in 20 games while averaging 6.6 points, 2.0 assists and 1.7 rebounds.

Edwards would only play 3 games in the 2001 season due to having a chronic left foot injury and would announce her retirement the next year on April 17, 2002. Because of this, her final WNBA game ever was the 3rd game she played with the Storm during her shortened 2001 season. That game was played on June 7, 2001 with the Storm falling 57 - 70 to the Miami Sol and Edwards only playing for less than 2 minutes (recording 1 rebound and no other stats).

== Awards and honors ==
- 1988—Big Ten Player of the Year
- 1988—Kodak All-American
- 1988—USBWA All-American
- 1988—Naismith All-American
- 1988—WBCA Player of the Year
- 2014—Women's Basketball Hall of Fame

== WNBA career statistics ==
Legend
GP	Games played	GS	Games started	MPG	Minutes per game	RPG	Rebounds per game
APG	Assists per game	SPG	Steals per game	BPG	Blocks per game	PPG	Points per game
TO	Turnovers per game	FG%	Field-goal percentage	3P%	3-point field-goal percentage	FT%	Free-throw percentage
**Bold**	Career best	°	League leader

=== Regular season ===
Year	Team	GP	GS	MPG	FG%	3P%	FT%	RPG	APG	SPG	BPG	TO	PPG
1997	Cleveland	20	14	**31.1**	**.447**	.231	.523	**3.5**	**4.5**	**1.7**	0.2	3.9	**10.2**
1998	Cleveland	23	9	23.2	.417	**.324**	.620	2.3	2.8	1.0	0.0	2.0	7.7
1999	Cleveland	**31**	**28**	24.0	.359	.217	.620	2.3	2.6	0.8	**0.3**	2.3	7.6
2000*	Cleveland	3	0	5.7	.400	.000	.000	0.7	0.3	0.0	0.0	1.3	2.7
2000*	Seattle	20	13	22.8	.357	.188	.657	1.7	2.0	0.7	0.3	1.9	6.6
2000	Total	23	13	20.5	.359	.171	.657	1.6	1.8	0.6	0.2	1.8	6.0
2001	Seattle	3	0	4.3	.333	.000	**1.000**	0.7	1.3	0.3	0.0	**1.0**	1.3
Career	5 years, 2 teams	100	64	23.9	.392	.232	.613	2.3	2.8	1.0	0.2	2.4	7.6

=== Playoffs ===
Year	Team	GP	GS	MPG	FG%	3P%	FT%	RPG	APG	SPG	BPG	TO	PPG
1998	Cleveland	3	3	31.7	.364	.167	.571	3.3	3.3	2.0	0.0	2.7	9.7
