= 1999 Cleveland Rockers season =

- Head coach: Linda Hill-MacDonald
- Arena: Gund Arena

Results
- Record: 7–25 (.219)
- Place: 6th (Eastern)
- Playoff finish: Did not qualify

The 1999 WNBA season was the 3rd for the Cleveland Rockers. The Rockers played their worst season in franchise history, finishing dead last in the league.

== Transactions ==
=== Orlando Miracle expansion draft ===
The following player was selected in the Orlando Miracle expansion draft from the Cleveland Rockers:

Player	Nationality	School/Team/Country
Adrienne Johnson	United States	Ohio State

=== WNBA draft ===
Round	Pick	Player	Nationality	School/Team/Country
1	11	Chasity Melvin	United States	Philadelphia Rage
2	23	Mery Andrade	Portugal	Old Dominion
3	35	Tracy Henderson	United States	Nashville Noise
4	47	Kellie Jolly Harper	United States	Tennessee

=== Transactions ===
Date	Transaction
April 6, 1999	Lost Adrienne Johnson to the Orlando Miracle in the WNBA expansion draft
May 4, 1999	Drafted Chasity Melvin, Mery Andrade, Tracy Henderson and Kellie Jolly Harper in the 1999 WNBA draft
May 24, 1999	Traded Cindy Blodgett to the Sacramento Monarchs in exchange for Quacy Barnes
June 21, 1999	Traded Jennifer Howard to the Los Angeles Sparks in exchange for Jamila Wideman
August 21, 1999	Fired Linda Hill-MacDonald as Head Coach

== Roster ==
1999 Cleveland Rockers roster
Players
Coaches

Pos.	No.	Nat.	Name	Height	Weight	DOB	From	Yrs
F	23	(Portugal)	Andrade, Mery	6' 0" (1.83m)	169 lb (77kg)	1975-12-31	Old Dominion	R
G	11	(United States)	Bader Binford, Tricia	5' 4" (1.63m)	125 lb (57kg)	1973-02-26	Boise State	1
F	8	(United States)	Braxton, Janice	6' 3" (1.91m)	178 lb (81kg)	1962-06-07	Louisiana Tech	2
F	34	(United States)	Brown, Rushia	6' 2" (1.88m)	175 lb (79kg)	1972-05-05	Furman	2
C	41	(United States)	Burras, Alisa	6' 3" (1.91m)	218 lb (99kg)	1975-06-23	Louisiana Tech	R
G	44	(United States)	Edwards, Michelle	5' 9" (1.75m)	150 lb (68kg)	1966-03-06	Iowa	2
C	47	(United States)	Henderson, Tracy	6' 3" (1.91m)	200 lb (91kg)	1974-12-31	Georgia	R
G	14	(United States)	Howard, Jennifer	5' 6" (1.68m)		1975-01-21	NC State	R
G	14	(United States)	Jolly Harper, Kellie	5' 10" (1.78m)	147 lb (67kg)	1977-05-03	Tennessee	R
G	25	(United States)	Jones, Merlakia	5' 10" (1.78m)	147 lb (67kg)	1973-06-21	Florida	2
G	4	(United States)	McConnell-Serio, Suzie			1966-07-29	Penn State	1
F/C	28	(United States)	Melvin, Chasity	6' 3" (1.91m)	185 lb (84kg)	1976-05-03	NC State	R
F	6	(Czechoslovakia)	Němcová, Eva	6' 3" (1.91m)	178 lb (81kg)	1972-12-03		2
F	17	(United States)	Nygaard, Vanessa	6' 1" (1.85m)	175 lb (79kg)	1975-03-13	Stanford	R
G	10	(United States)	Wideman, Jamila	5' 6" (1.68m)	135 lb (61kg)	1975-10-16	Stanford	2

Head coach
(United States) Linda Hill-MacDonald (West Chester)
Assistant coaches
(United States) Mike Wilhelm

Legend

- (C) Team captain
- (DP) Unsigned draft pick
- (FA) Free agent
- (S) Suspended
- Injured

== Schedule ==
=== Regular season ===
1999 game log
Total: 7–25 (Home: 5–11; Road: 2–14)
June: 2–7 (Home: 2–4; Road: 0–3)

Game	Date	Team	Score	High points	High rebounds	High assists	Location Attendance	Record
1	June 10	@ New York	L 60–87	Merlakia Jones (14)	Merlakia Jones (8)	Suzie McConnell-Serio (4)	Madison Square Garden	0–1
2	June 12	Los Angeles	L 59–75	Brown; Jones (11)	Tracy Henderson (7)	Suzie McConnell-Serio (5)	Gund Arena	0–2
3	June 14	Detroit	L 71–73	Merlakia Jones (24)	Chasity Melvin (10)	Chasity Melvin (4)	Gund Arena	0–3
4	June 17	@ Sacramento	L 50–70	Brown; Melvin (10)	Tracy Henderson (8)	Suzie McConnell-Serio (6)	ARCO Arena	0–4
5	June 19	@ Phoenix	L 67–76	Edwards; Němcová (14)	Alisa Burras (11)	Suzie McConnell-Serio (6)	America West Arena	0–5
6	June 22	Orlando	L 62–71	Chasity Melvin (16)	Alisa Burras (8)	Edwards; Němcová (5)	Gund Arena	0–6
7	June 25	Charlotte	L 57–59	Janice Braxton (12)	Braxton; Melvin (5)	Edwards; Němcová; McConnell-Serio (3)	Gund Arena	0–7
8	June 26	Washington	W 76–65	Merlakia Jones (16)	Merlakia Jones (7)	Suzie McConnell-Serio (7)	Gund Arena	1–7
9	June 28	Phoenix	W 70–51	Chasity Melvin (15)	Brown; Andrade (8)	Suzie McConnell-Serio (7)	Gund Arena	2–7

July : 4–10 (Home: 2–5; Road: 2–5)

Game	Date	Team	Score	High points	High rebounds	High assists	Location Attendance	Record
10	July 1	@ Houston	L 64–76	Michelle Edwards (15)	Alisa Burras (8)	Suzie McConnell-Serio (5)	Compaq Center	2–8
11	July 2	@ Utah	L 68–83	Eva Němcová (15)	Alisa Burras (5)	Chasity Melvin (4)	Delta Center	2–9
12	July 5	@ Los Angeles	L 72–74	Eva Němcová (20)	Janice Braxton (7)	Braxton; McConnell-Serio (3)	Great Western Forum	2–10
13	July 7	@ Charlotte	L 62–75	Eva Němcová (11)	Eva Němcová (7)	Michelle Edwards (8)	Charlotte Coliseum	2–11
14	July 8	New York	L 49–84	Janice Braxton (11)	Braxton; Jones; Melvin (4)	Edwards; Němcová; Wideman (9)	Gund Arena	2–12
15	July 10	Charlotte	W 82–56	Alisa Burras (20)	Alisa Burras (7)	Suzie McConnell-Serio (6)	Gund Arena	3–12
16	July 12	Minnesota	W 67–55	Merlakia Jones (21)	Chasity Melvin (6)	Suzie McConnell-Serio (8)	Gund Arena	4–12
17	July 16	Sacramento	L 71–85	Merlakia Jones (17)	Chasity Melvin (10)	Suzie McConnell-Serio (3)	Gund Arena	4–13
18	July 17	@ Detroit	L 61–77	Alisa Burras (13)	Eva Němcová (6)	Michelle Edwards (3)	The Palace of Auburn Hills	4–14
19	July 21	@ Washington	W 85–68	Eva Němcová (19)	Burras; Edwards; Melvin; Němcová (4)	Michelle Edwards (9)	MCI Center	5–14
20	July 23	Detroit	L 60–69	Eva Němcová (16)	Merlakia Jones (9)	Michelle Edwards (4)	Gund Arena	5–15
21	July 24	Utah	L 70–76	Merlakia Jones (27)	Eva Němcová (5)	Jamila Wideman (5)	Gund Arena	5–16
22	July 29	Houston	L 65–71	Merlakia Jones (15)	Eva Němcová (8)	Eva Němcová (4)	Gund Arena	5–17
23	July 31	@ Detroit	W 55–53	Burras; Melvin (10)	Eva Němcová (8)	Michelle Edwards (3)	The Palace of Auburn Hills	6–17

August : 1–8 (Home: 1–2; Road: 0–6)

Game	Date	Team	Score	High points	High rebounds	High assists	Location Attendance	Record
24	August 2	@ Charlotte	L 56–62	Chasity Melvin (13)	Janice Braxton (5)	Michelle Edwards (6)	Charlotte Coliseum	6–18
25	August 4	@ Orlando	L 62–70	Brown; Němcová (12)	Brown; Burras (6)	Merlakia Jones (5)	TD Waterhouse Centre	6–19
26	August 7	Washington	L 62–63	Merlakia Jones (17)	Merlakia Jones (7)	Merlakia Jones (4)	Gund Arena	6–20
27	August 8	@ Washington	L 45–80	Edwards; Melvin (8)	Janice Braxton (9)	Chasity Melvin (3)	MCI Center	6–21
28	August 12	@ Orlando	L 54–55	Eva Němcová (16)	Němcová; Henderson (7)	Edwards (4)	TD Waterhouse Centre	6–22
29	August 14	Orlando	L 61–73	Edwards (17)	Janice Braxton (6)	Edwards (43)	Gund Arena	6–23
30	August 16	@ Minnesota	L 50–57	Eva Němcová (17)	Merlakia Jones (7)	Mery Andrade (5)	Target Center	6–24
30	August 19	@ New York	L 55–72	Merlakia Jones (14)	Janice Braxton (7)	Jamila Wideman (5)	Madison Square Garden	6–25
30	August 21	New York	W 66–56	Merlakia Jones (19)	Eva Němcová (7)	Jamila Wideman (6)	Gund Arena	7–25

1999 season schedule

=== Season standings ===
Eastern Conference	W	L	PCT	Conf.	GB
New York Liberty ^{x}	18	14	.563	12–8	–
Detroit Shock ^{x}	15	17	.469	12–8	3.0
Charlotte Sting ^{x}	15	17	.469	12–8	3.0
Orlando Miracle ^{o}	15	17	.469	9–11	3.0
Washington Mystics ^{o}	12	20	.375	10–10	6.0
Cleveland Rockers ^{o}	7	25	.219	5–15	11.0

== Statistics ==
Legend
GP	Games played	GS	Games started	MPG	Minutes per game	RPG	Rebounds per game
APG	Assists per game	SPG	Steals per game	BPG	Blocks per game	PPG	Points per game
FG%	Field-goal percentage	3P%	3-point field-goal percentage	FT%	Free-throw percentage	TO	Turnovers per game
PF	Fouls per game		Team leader		League leader

=== Regular season ===
Player	GP	GS	MPG	FG%	3P%	FT%	RPG	APG	SPG	BPG	PPG
Eva Němcová	31	28	29.8	.419	.366	.984	3.7	1.6	1.0	0.7	11.1
Suzie McConnell-Serio	18	18	28.4	.367	.333	.842	2.4	4.2	0.6	0.1	6.0
Merlakia Jones	32	8	26.7	.434	.278	.769	3.8	1.6	1.3	0.2	10.8
Michelle Edwards	31	28	24.0	.359	.217	.692	2.3	2.6	0.8	0.3	7.6
Chasity Melvin	32	9	22.2	.438	1.000	.694	4.0	1.2	0.6	0.7	8.1
Janice Braxton	26	21	18.3	.460	.125	.697	4.3	1.3	0.7	0.5	5.8
Alisa Burras	31	22	18.2	.539	N/A	.553	4.0	0.5	0.5	0.3	7.5
Jamila Wideman	26	13	15.4	.273	.136	.647	1.3	2.0	0.8	0.0	2.2
Rushia Brown	30	12	14.5	.427	.000	.676	2.9	0.7	0.6	0.3	4.4
Mery Andrade	32	1	11.4	.390	.292	.692	1.6	1.5	0.6	0.1	2.2
Tracy Henderson	27	0	11.4	.310	N/A	.586	2.9	0.3	0.3	0.7	2.6
Tricia Bader Binsford	9	0	8.0	.154	.125	N/A	1.2	1.2	0.3	0.0	0.6
Vanessa Nygaard	4	0	5.0	.500	.500	N/A	0.8	0.5	0.5	0.0	0.8
Kellie Jolly Harper	1	0	4.0	N/A	N/A	N/A	0.0	1.0	0.0	0.0	0.0
Jennifer Howard	4	0	3.8	.000	.000	N/A	0.0	0.0	0.0	0.0	0.0

^{‡}Waived/Released during the season
^{†}Traded during the season
^{≠}Acquired during the season
