= Isabelle Fijalkowski =

French basketball player

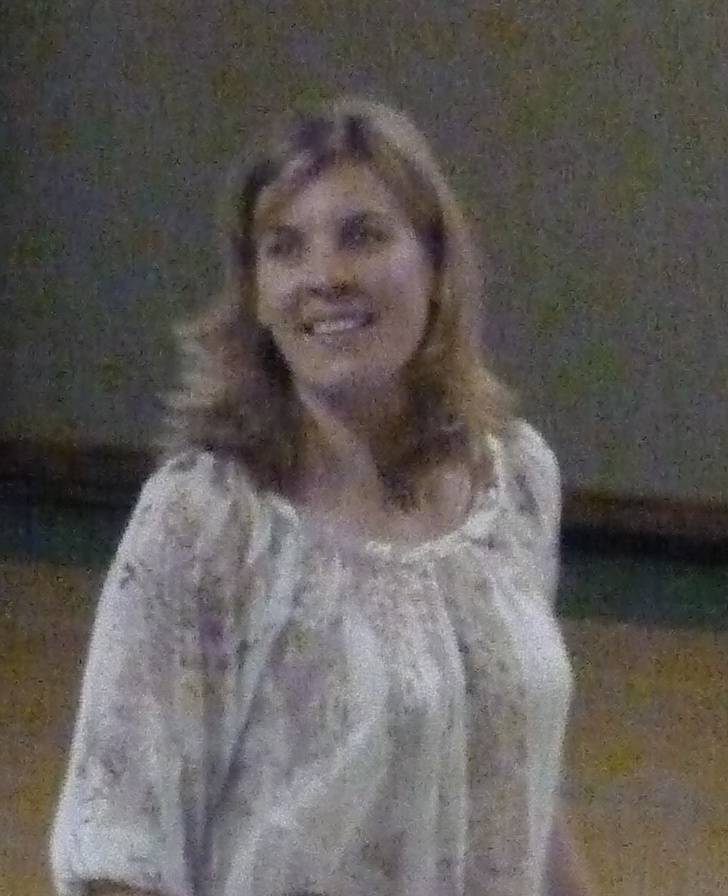

Personal information
- Born: 23 May 1972 (age 54) Clermont-Ferrand, Puy-de-Dôme, France
- Listed height: 6 ft 5 in (1.96 m)
- Listed weight: 205 lb (93 kg)

Career information
- College: Colorado (1994–1995)
- WNBA draft: 1997: Elite Draft
- Drafted by: Cleveland Rockers
- Playing career: 1988–2002
- Position: Center / power forward
- Number: 13

Career history
- 1988–1991: Montferrand
- 1991–1992: Challes-les-Eaux
- 1992–1994: Clermont-Ferrand
- 1995–1997: CJM Bourges Basket
- 1997–1998: Cleveland Rockers
- 1997–2000: Pool Comense 1872
- 2000–2002: Union Sportive Valenciennes Olympic

Career highlights
- 5× French League champion (1992, 1996, 1997, 2001, 2002); 2× Italian League champion (1998, 1999); 2× French Cup winner (2001, 2002); First-team All-Big 8 (1995)
- Stats at WNBA.com
- Stats at Basketball Reference
- Women's Basketball Hall of Fame
- FIBA Hall of Fame
Medals
Representing France
EuroBasket Women
Gold medal – first place	2001 France	Team
Silver medal – second place	1993 Italy	Team
Silver medal – second place	1999 Poland	Team

Isabelle Alice Fijalkowski (born 23 May 1972 in Clermont-Ferrand, Puy-de-Dôme), now Isabelle Fijalkowski-Tournebize, is a French former basketball player. She was inducted into the French Basketball Hall of Fame, in 2011. In 2026, she was inducted into the Women’s Basketball Hall of Fame.

== Career ==
=== United States ===
Fijalkowski played college basketball for University of Colorado, then was drafted by the Cleveland Rockers in 1997.

Fijalkowski's WNBA debut was played on 21 June 1997 against the Houston Comets. Although her team would lose the game 56 - 76, Fijalkowski recorded 12 points, 6 rebounds, 1 assist and 1 block in her debut. She set a career-high of 25 points on 27 June 1998 against the Detroit Shock and then set a career-high in rebounds (12) on 10 August 1998 against the Phoenix Mercury.

Her final WNBA game was played in Game 3 of the 1998 Semi-Finals on 25 August 1998 against the Phoenix Mercury. The Rockers would lose the game 60 - 71 and dropped the series to the Mercury 2 - 1. Fijalkowski had a team-high 17 points and team-high 11 rebounds in her final game.

== Personal life ==
Fijalkowski's daughter, Alicia Tournebize, is a professional basketball player, and the first Frenchwoman to perform a dunk in an official game.

== Achievements ==
=== France national team ===
- 9th at 1994 World Championship
- Finalist of EuroBasket 1993 and EuroBasket 1999
- 5th at the 2000 Olympic Games of Sydney
- EuroBasket 2001: champion
- 200 selections.

=== Club ===
- Winner of the EuroLeague Women: 1997, 2002 (Runner-up: 1999, 2001)
- Winner of French championship: 1992, 1996, 1997, 2001 et 2002
- Winner of the Italian championship: 1998, 1999
- Tournoi de la Fédération: 1996, 2001, 2002
- MVP of the French championship 1996-1997
- MVP of the Italian championship 1998-1999

== Career statistics ==
Legend
GP	Games played	GS	Games started	MPG	Minutes per game	RPG	Rebounds per game
APG	Assists per game	SPG	Steals per game	BPG	Blocks per game	PPG	Points per game
TO	Turnovers per game	FG%	Field-goal percentage	3P%	3-point field-goal percentage	FT%	Free-throw percentage
**Bold**	Career best	°	League leader

=== Regular season ===
Year	Team	GP	GS	MPG	FG%	3P%	FT%	RPG	APG	SPG	BPG	TO	PPG
1997	Cleveland	**28**	**28**	28.7	.508	.250	.786	5.6	**2.4**	**0.6**	0.6	**2.6**	11.9
1998	Cleveland	**28**	23	**28.8**	**.547**	**.400**	**.821**	**6.9**	2.1	**0.6**	**1.0**	2.9	**13.7**
Career	2 years, 1 team	56	51	28.7	.528	.357	.804	6.2	2.3	0.6	0.8	2.8	12.8

=== Playoffs ===
Year	Team	GP	GS	MPG	FG%	3P%	FT%	RPG	APG	SPG	BPG	TO	PPG
1998	Cleveland	3	3	35.7	.425	.000	.864	9.0	1.3	0.7	0.7	1.7	17.7
