= Cleveland Rockers =

American professional women's basketball team

- Conference: Eastern
- Leagues: WNBA
- Founded: 1997
- Dissolved: 2003
- History: Cleveland Rockers; 1997–2003
- Arena: Gund Arena
- Location: Cleveland, Ohio
- Team colors: Black, blue, silver, orange, white
- Ownership: Gordon Gund
- Championships: 0
- Conference titles: 1 (1998)

The Cleveland Rockers were a Women's National Basketball Association (WNBA) team based in Cleveland, that played from 1997 until 2003. The Rockers were one of the original eight franchises of the WNBA, which started play in 1997. The owner, Gordon Gund, also owned the NBA's Cleveland Cavaliers at the time. In October 2003, Gund announced that his Gund Arena Company would no longer operate the Rockers. The team folded after the 2003 season as the league could not find it new ownership.

== History ==
The city of Cleveland was granted one of the original eight franchises of the WNBA in October 1996. The Cleveland Rockers got their nickname from Cleveland's Rock and Roll Hall of Fame. In 1997, they started with players Isabelle Fijalkowski and former Harlem Globetrotters member Lynette Woodard, who had been the first female player in Globetrotter history.

The Rockers finished 15–13 in the inaugural 1997 WNBA season, missing the playoffs. In 1998, the Rockers went 20–10 and won the Eastern Conference title. However, the Rockers lost to the Phoenix Mercury in the WNBA semifinals (before the WNBA split the playoffs by conference).

The Rockers had their best regular season in 2001, going 22–10 and winning the Eastern Conference, getting the No. 1 seed. Their relentless defense allowed just 55.9 points per game that year, a record that still stands. But the Rockers would be upended by the Charlotte Sting in the 1st round, losing 2 games to 1. The 2002 Rockers fell by 12 games over the previous year's mark, posting a 10–22 record. In 2003, the Rockers would go 17–17, good enough for the No. 4 seed in the East; however, they would fall in the first round of the playoffs to the eventual champion Detroit Shock, 2–1. 2003 was the Rockers' last playoff appearance, and is the only team in the WNBA to qualify for the playoffs in their last season of play.

=== Folding ===
After the 2002 season, the Gunds decided to buy the Rockers from the WNBA, seemingly ensuring the Rockers' future. However, despite fielding competitive teams and having decent attendance for most games, the Gund family decided they did not wish to operate the Rockers after the 2003 season, citing a lack of revenue and lackluster attendance. No local ownership was found for the team, forcing the Rockers to fold in December 2003, and the players went to the other teams in the league via a dispersal draft in January 2004. The Rockers ceased operation after seven seasons, posting an all-time record of 108–112. A WNBA franchise would next fold in 2008 when the Houston Comets ceased operations because of lack of ownership.

=== Return of WNBA basketball to Cleveland ===
WNBA basketball returned to Cleveland when the WNBA announced in 2025 that the state had been awarded an expansion franchise to begin play in the 2028 WNBA season. In 2026, the team's name for the new franchise became the Cleveland Sirens.

== Season-by-season records ==
Overview of Cleveland Rockers seasons
Season	Team	Conference		Regular season			Playoff results	Head coach
Season	Team	Conference		W	L	PCT	Playoff results	Head coach
1997	1997	East	4th	15	13	.536		Linda Hill-MacDonald
1998	1998	East	1st	20	10	.667	Lost WNBA Semifinals (Phoenix, 1–2)	Linda Hill-MacDonald
1999	1999	East	6th	7	25	.219		Linda Hill-MacDonald
2000	2000	East	2nd	17	15	.531	Won Conference Semifinals (Orlando, 2–1); Lost Conference Finals (New York, 1–2)	Dan Hughes
2001	2001	East	1st	22	10	.688	Lost Conference Semifinals (Charlotte, 1–2)	Dan Hughes
2002	2002	East	7th	10	22	.313		Dan Hughes
2003	2003	East	4th	17	17	.500	Lost Conference Semifinals (Detroit, 1–2)	Dan Hughes
Regular Season				108	112	.491	0 Conference Championships	
Playoffs				6	9	.400	0 WNBA Championships	

== Hall of famers ==
=== Women's Basketball Hall of Fame ===
Cleveland Rockers Hall of Famers
No.	Name	Position	Tenure	Inducted
4	Suzie McConnell-Serio	G	1998-2000	2008
44	Michelle Edwards	G	1997-2000	2014

=== Naismith Basketball Hall of Fame ===
Cleveland Rockers Hall of Famers
No.	Name	Position	Tenure	Inducted
8	Lynette Woodard	G	1997	2004

=== FIBA Hall of Famers ===
Cleveland Rockers Hall of Famers
No.	Name	Position	Tenure	Inducted
13	Isabelle Fijalkowski	PF	1997–1998	2020

== Coaches and others ==
Head coaches:

- Linda Hill-MacDonald (1997–1999)
- Dan Hughes (2000–2003)

General Managers:

- Wayne Embry (1997–99)
- Jim Paxson

Assistant coaches

- Mike Wilhelm (1997–99)
- Lisa Boyer (1998-2002)
- Cheryl Reeve (2003)
