= 1998 Phoenix Mercury season =

WNBA team season

- Head coach: Cheryl Miller
- Arena: America West Arena

Results
- Record: 19–11 (.633)
- Place: 2nd (Western)
- Playoff finish: Lost WNBA Finals (2-1) to Houston Comets

The 1998 WNBA season was the second season for the Phoenix Mercury. The Mercury reached their first WNBA Finals, but championship hopes were denied when they lost to the Houston Comets in three games.

== Transactions ==
=== Detroit Shock expansion draft ===
The following player was selected in the Detroit Shock expansion draft from the Phoenix Mercury:

Player	Nationality	School/Team/Country
Tara Williams	United States	Auburn

=== WNBA draft ===
Round	Pick	Player	Nationality	School/Team/Country
1	8	Maria Stepanova	Soviet Union	CSKA Moscow (Russia)
2	18	Andrea Kuklová	Czechoslovakia	Pays d'Aix Basket 13 (France)
3	28	Brandy Reed	United States	Southern Miss
4	38	Karen Wilkins	United States	Howard

=== Transactions ===
Date	Transaction
February 18, 1998	Lost Tara Williams to the Detroit Shock in the WNBA expansion draft.
April 29, 1998	Drafted Maria Stepanova, Andrea Kuklová, Brandy Reed and Karen Wilkins in the 1998 WNBA draft
May 29, 1998	Waived Monique Ambers
May 30, 1998	Waived Karen Wilkins
June 4, 1998	Waived Tawona Alhaleem
June 10, 1998	Waived Tia Jackson
July 6, 1998	Traded Pauline Jordan to the Sacramento Monarchs in exchange for Tiffani Johnson
July 31, 1998	Waived Mikiko Hagiwara

== Roster ==
1998 Phoenix Mercury roster
Players
Coaches

Pos.	No.	Nat.	Name	Height	Weight	DOB	From	Yrs
C	14	(West Germany)	Askamp, Marlies	6' 5" (1.96m)	198 lb (90kg)	1970-07-08		1
F	12	(Australia)	Brogan, Michelle	6' 1" (1.85m)	177 lb (80kg)	1973-02-08		R
F/C	0	(United States)	Foster, Toni	6' 1" (1.85m)	175 lb (79kg)	1971-11-16	Iowa	1
F/C	22	(United States)	Gillom, Jennifer	6' 3" (1.91m)	180 lb (82kg)	1964-06-13	Mississippi	1
G	24	(Japan)	Hagiwara, Mikiko	5' 9" (1.75m)	160 lb (73kg)	1970-04-27		1
G	4	(Australia)	Harrower, Kristi	5' 4" (1.63m)	139 lb (63kg)	1975-03-04		R
F/C	11	(United States)	Jordan, Pauline	6' 3" (1.91m)	205 lb (93kg)	1968-04-27	UNLV	R
G/F	15	(Czechoslovakia)	Kuklová, Andrea	6' 0" (1.83m)	150 lb (68kg)	1971-07-16		R
G	32	(United States)	Pettis, Bridget	5' 9" (1.75m)	150 lb (68kg)	1971-01-01	Florida	1
F	13	(United States)	Reed, Brandy	6' 1" (1.85m)	168 lb (76kg)	1977-02-17	Southern Miss	R
C	8	(Soviet Union)	Stepanova, Maria	6' 8" (2.03m)	187 lb (85kg)	1979-01-23		R
G	7	(Australia)	Timms, Michele	5' 7" (1.7m)	132 lb (60kg)	1965-06-28		1
G/F	21	(United States)	Webb, Umeki	5' 10" (1.78m)	162 lb (73kg)	1975-06-26	NC State	1

Head coach
(United States) Cheryl Miller (USC)

Legend

- (C) Team captain
- (DP) Unsigned draft pick
- (FA) Free agent
- (S) Suspended
- Injured

== Schedule ==
=== Regular season ===
1998 game log
Total: 19–11 (Home: 13–3; Road: 6–8)
June: 6–2 (Home: 4–1; Road: 2–1)

Game	Date	Team	Score	High points	High rebounds	High assists	Location Attendance	Record
1	June 11	@ Sacramento	W 73–70	Jennifer Gillom (20)	Brandy Reed (8)	Umeki Webb (8)	ARCO Arena	1–0
2	June 14	Los Angeles	W 70–60	Jennifer Gillom (20)	Jennifer Gillom (6)	Umeki Webb (4)	America West Arena	2–0
3	June 15	Washington	W 69–54	Jennifer Gillom (19)	Jennifer Gillom (11)	Michele Timms (4)	America West Arena	3–0
4	June 21	Charlotte	L 71–72	Bridget Pettis (20)	Michelle Brogan (9)	Gillom; Webb (3)	America West Arena	3–1
5	June 24	Houston	W 69–66	Bridget Pettis (20)	Michelle Brogan (7)	Michele Timms (8)	America West Arena	4–1
6	June 26	Utah	W 96–63	Jennifer Gillom (19)	Marlies Askamp (8)	Umeki Webb (6)	America West Arena	5–1
7	June 28	@ Washington	W 86–69	Bridget Pettis (23)	Jennifer Gillom (8)	Kristi Harrower (7)	MCI Center	6–1
8	June 29	@ New York	L 68–71	Michelle Brogan (15)	Michelle Brogan (5)	Michele Timms (5)	Madison Square Garden	6–2

July: 6–7 (Home: 4–2; Road: 2–5)

Game	Date	Team	Score	High points	High rebounds	High assists	Location Attendance	Record
9	July 2	@ Cleveland	W 76–61	Jennifer Gillom (29)	Jennifer Gillom (8)	Michele Timms (5)	Gund Arena	7–2
10	July 4	@ Charlotte	L 66–68	Jennifer Gillom (21)	Bridget Pettis (7)	Michele Timms (9)	Charlotte Coliseum	7–3
11	July 8	@ Detroit	W 78–76	Jennifer Gillom (24)	Jennifer Gillom (10)	Michele Timms (8)	The Palace of Auburn Hills	8–3
12	July 10	Cleveland	W 76–60	Jennifer Gillom (28)	Marlies Askamp (11)	Michele Timms (8)	America West Arena	9–3
13	July 13	Los Angeles	W 72–62	Jennifer Gillom (27)	Jennifer Gillom (9)	Michele Timms (5)	America West Arena	10–3
14	July 15	Detroit	W 73–60	Jennifer Gillom (17)	Michelle Brogan (6)	Michele Timms (5)	America West Arena	11–3
15	July 18	New York	L 63–69	Michelle Brogan (14)	Jennifer Gillom (6)	Michele Timms (8)	America West Arena	11–4
16	July 20	Sacramento	W 88–67	Bridget Pettis (18)	Brogan; Gillom; Webb (6)	Michele Timms (9)	America West Arena	12–4
17	July 21	Houston	L 62–65	Jennifer Gillom (24)	Jennifer Gillom (11)	Michele Timms (6)	America West Arena	12–5
18	July 23	@ Los Angeles	L 68–70	Jennifer Gillom (27)	Jennifer Gillom (9)	Jennifer Gillom (4)	Great Western Forum	12–6
19	July 27	@ Utah	L 80–90	Jennifer Gillom (31)	Michelle Brogan (7)	Michele Timms (6)	Delta Center	12–7
20	July 28	@ Houston	L 62–72	Jennifer Gillom (23)	Jennifer Gillom (13)	Timms; Webb (3)	Compaq Center	12–8
21	July 31	@ Los Angeles	L 56–71	Jennifer Gillom (23)	Jennifer Gillom (10)	Bridget Pettis (4)	Great Western Forum	12–9

August: 7–2 (Home: 5–0; Road: 2–2)

Game	Date	Team	Score	High points	High rebounds	High assists	Location Attendance	Record
22	August 4	Washington	W 88–59	Jennifer Gillom (21)	Marlies Askamp (8)	Harrower; Timms (4)	America West Arena	13–9
23	August 6	@ Houston	L 64–75	Jennifer Gillom (19)	Brandy Reed (6)	Kuklová; Timms; Webb (3)	Compaq Center	13–10
24	August 8	Utah	W 68–62	Bridget Pettis (21)	Gillom; Pettis (8)	Michele Timms (9)	America West Arena	14–10
25	August 10	Cleveland	W 82–80 (2OT)	Jennifer Gillom (38)	Jennifer Gillom (8)	Michele Timms (7)	America West Arena	15–10
26	August 11	@ New York	L 78–79 (OT)	Jennifer Gillom (21)	Jennifer Gillom (7)	Brogan; Pettis; Timms (4)	Madison Square Garden	15–11
27	August 14	Detroit	W 84–59	Gillom; Pettis (23)	Bridget Pettis (7)	Michele Timms (7)	America West Arena	16–11
28	August 16	@ Monarchs	W 85–69	Jennifer Gillom (25)	Michelle Brogan (8)	Umeki Webb (5)	ARCO Arena	17–11
29	August 17	@ Utah	W 75–64	Jennifer Gillom (20)	Gillom; Reed; Webb (7)	Michele Timms (7)	Delta Center	18–11
30	August 19	Monarchs	W 71–62	Jennifer Gillom (18)	Jennifer Gillom (8)	Michele Timms (4)	America West Arena	19–11

1998 season schedule

=== Playoffs ===
1998 playoff game log
Semifinal vs. Cleveland Rockers
Won Series: 2–1

Game	Date	Team	Score	High points	High rebounds	High assists	Location Attendance	Series
1	August 22	Cleveland	W 78–68	Jennifer Gillom (21)	Gillom; Reed (5)	Umeki Webb (6)	America West Arena	1–0
2	August 24	@ Cleveland	L 66–67	Jennifer Gillom (27)	Jennifer Gillom (10)	Michele Timms (6)	Gund Arena	1–1
3	August 25	@ Cleveland	W 71–60	Bridget Pettis (27)	Bridget Pettis (11)	Michele Timms (8)	Gund Arena	2–1

Championship vs. Houston Comets
Lost Series: 1–2

Game	Date	Team	Score	High points	High rebounds	High assists	Location Attendance	Series
1	August 27	@ Phoenix	W 54–51	Jennifer Gillom (15)	Michelle Brogan (12)	Michele Timms (5)	America West Arena	1–0
2	August 29	Phoenix	L 69–74 (OT)	Michele Timms (21)	Jennifer Gillom (9)	Michelle Brogan (3)	Compaq Center	1–1
3	September 1	Phoenix	L 71–80	Michelle Brogan (24)	Jennifer Gillom (6)	Michele Timms (7)	Compaq Center	1–2

1998 playoff schedule

=== Season standings ===
Western Conference	W	L	PCT	Conf.	GB
Houston Comets ^{x}	27	3	.900	15–1	–
Phoenix Mercury ^{x}	19	11	.633	10–6	8.0
Los Angeles Sparks ^{o}	12	18	.400	6–10	15.0
Sacramento Monarchs ^{o}	8	22	.267	5–11	19.0
Utah Starzz ^{o}	8	22	.267	4–12	19.0

== Statistics ==
Legend
GP	Games played	GS	Games started	MPG	Minutes per game	RPG	Rebounds per game
APG	Assists per game	SPG	Steals per game	BPG	Blocks per game	PPG	Points per game
FG%	Field-goal percentage	3P%	3-point field-goal percentage	FT%	Free-throw percentage	TO	Turnovers per game
PF	Fouls per game		Team leader		League leader

=== Regular season ===
Player	GP	GS	MPG	FG%	3P%	FT%	RPG	APG	SPG	BPG	PPG
Jennifer Gillom	30	30	32.1	.465	.378	.703	7.3	1.4	1.7	0.3	20.9
Michele Timms	30	30	31.1	.318	.298	.694	2.5	5.3	1.3	0.1	6.9
Bridget Pettis	30	28	28.3	.377	.285	.865	3.4	2.1	1.0	0.3	11.3
Umeki Webb	30	30	28.2	.363	.286	.661	3.9	3.1	1.6	0.7	5.3
Michelle Brogan	30	25	26.0	.505	.478	.796	4.4	1.4	1.5	0.2	9.2
Toni Foster	16	5	13.6	.467	N/A	.767	1.9	1.2	0.9	0.3	4.9
Marlies Askamp	26	0	12.3	.471	N/A	.661	3.3	0.5	0.5	0.3	5.3
Kristi Harrower	30	0	11.8	.365	.344	.750	0.7	1.7	0.5	0.1	2.3
Andrea Kuklová	29	2	11.7	.400	.143	.556	1.3	1.1	0.6	0.1	3.3
Brandy Reed	24	0	10.6	.526	.250	.710	3.3	0.8	0.8	0.3	5.2
Maria Stepanova	20	0	6.5	.426	N/A	.636	1.9	0.4	0.2	0.6	3.3
Mikiko Hagiwara	10	0	5.9	.381	.333	.667	0.2	0.3	0.0	0.0	2.2
Pauline Jordan	6	0	5.0	.625	N/A	.714	0.8	0.7	0.0	0.0	2.5

^{‡}Waived/Released during the season
^{†}Traded during the season
^{≠}Acquired during the season
