= 1999 Phoenix Mercury season =

- Head coach: Cheryl Miller
- Arena: America West Arena

Results
- Record: 15–17 (.469)
- Place: 4th (Western)
- Playoff finish: Did not qualify

The 1999 WNBA season was the third season for the Phoenix Mercury. The Mercury failed to qualify for the postseason after advancing to the WNBA Finals during the previous year.

== Transactions ==
=== Minnesota Lynx expansion draft ===
The following player was selected in the Minnesota Lynx expansion draft from the Phoenix Mercury:

Player	Nationality	School/Team/Country
Brandy Reed	United States	Southern Miss

=== WNBA draft ===
Round	Pick	Player	Nationality	School/Team/Country
1	10	Edna Campbell	United States	Colorado Xplosion
2	22	Clarissa Davis-Wrightsil	United States	San Jose Lasers
3	34	Lisa Harrison	United States	Columbus Quest
4	46	Amanda Wilson	United States	Louisiana Tech

=== Transactions ===
Date	Transaction
April 6, 1999	Lost Brandy Reed to the Minnesota Lynx in the WNBA expansion draft.
May 4, 1999	Drafted Edna Campbell, Clarissa Davis-Wrightsil, Lisa Harrison and Amanda Wilson in the 1999 WNBA draft
May 14, 1999	Signed MerleLynn Lange-Harris
May 25, 1999	Signed Trisha Stafford-Odom
June 2, 1999	Waived Trisha Stafford-Odom
June 8, 1999	Waived Umeki Webb
June 9, 1999	Waived Toni Foster
June 17, 1999	Waived Andrea Kuklová and Clarissa Davis-Wrightsil
June 20, 1999	Waived MerleLynn Lange-Harris
July 19, 1999	Signed Angela Aycock and Toni Foster
October 27, 1999	Traded Marlies Askamp, Kristi Harrower and Angela Aycock to the Minnesota Lynx in exchange for Adia Barnes, Tonya Edwards and Trisha Fallon

== Roster ==
1999 Phoenix Mercury roster
Players
Coaches

Pos.	No.	Nat.	Name	Height	Weight	DOB	From	Yrs
C	14	(West Germany)	Askamp, Marlies	6' 5" (1.96m)	198 lb (90kg)	1970-07-08		2
G	23	(United States)	Aycock, Angela	6' 2" (1.88m)	161 lb (73kg)	1973-02-28	Kansas	R
G	12	(United States)	Campbell, Edna	5' 8" (1.73m)	152 lb (69kg)	1968-11-26	Texas	R
F	24	(United States)	Davis-Wrightsil, Clarissa			1967-06-04	Texas	R
F/C	0	(United States)	Foster, Toni	6' 1" (1.85m)	175 lb (79kg)	1971-11-16	Iowa	2
F/C	22	(United States)	Gillom, Jennifer	6' 3" (1.91m)	180 lb (82kg)	1964-06-13	Mississippi	2
F	3	(United States)	Harrison, Lisa	6' 1" (1.85m)	164 lb (74kg)	1971-01-02	Tennessee	R
G	4	(Australia)	Harrower, Kristi	5' 4" (1.63m)	139 lb (63kg)	1975-03-04		1
G/F	15	(Czechoslovakia)	Kuklová, Andrea	6' 0" (1.83m)	150 lb (68kg)	1971-07-16		1
F/C	23	(Canada)	Lange-Harris, MerleLynn	6' 6" (1.98m)		1969-08-28	UNLV	R
G	32	(United States)	Pettis, Bridget	5' 9" (1.75m)	150 lb (68kg)	1971-01-01	Florida	2
C	8	(Soviet Union)	Stepanova, Maria	6' 8" (2.03m)	187 lb (85kg)	1979-01-23		1
G	7	(Australia)	Timms, Michele	5' 7" (1.7m)	132 lb (60kg)	1965-06-28		2
F	30	(United States)	Wilson, Amanda	5' 11" (1.8m)	176 lb (80kg)	1977-02-06	Louisiana Tech	R

Head coach
(United States) Cheryl Miller (USC)

Legend

- (C) Team captain
- (DP) Unsigned draft pick
- (FA) Free agent
- (S) Suspended
- Injured

== Schedule ==
=== Regular season ===
1999 game log
Total: 15–17 (Home: 12–4; Road: 3–13)
June: 3–5 (Home: 1–1; Road: 2–4)

Game	Date	Team	Score	High points	High rebounds	High assists	Location Attendance	Record
1	June 12	@ Sacramento	L 85–96	Jennifer Gillom (23)	Jennifer Gillom (9)	Michele Timms (10)	ARCO Arena	0–1
2	June 14	Sacramento	L 64–74	Jennifer Gillom (29)	Jennifer Gillom (15)	Gillom; Timms (4)	America West Arena	0–2
3	June 19	Cleveland	W 76–67	Edna Campbell (21)	Marlies Askamp (15)	Michele Timms (7)	America West Arena	1–2
4	June 21	@ Orlando	L 76–80	Jennifer Gillom (25)	Marlies Askamp (12)	Michele Timms (7)	TD Waterhouse Centre	1–3
5	June 22	@ Washington	W 79–76	Clarissa Davis-Wrightsil (23)	Harrison; Stepanova (5)	Michele Timms (4)	MCI Center	2–3
6	June 24	@ Charlotte	L 72–88	Jennifer Gillom (20)	Marlies Askamp (10)	Michele Timms (7)	Charlotte Coliseum	2–4
7	June 26	@ Detroit	W 66–60	Jennifer Gillom (17)	Jennifer Gillom (13)	Harrower; Timms (5)	The Palace of Auburn Hills	3–4
8	June 28	@ Cleveland	L 51–70	Bridget Pettis (13)	Marlies Askamp (6)	Michele Timms (7)	Gund Arena	3–5

July: 7–7 (Home: 6–2; Road: 1–5)

Game	Date	Team	Score	High points	High rebounds	High assists	Location Attendance	Record
9	July 1	@ New York	L 67–83	Clarissa Davis-Wrightsil (20)	Marlies Askamp (10)	Michele Timms (7)	Madison Square Garden	3–6
10	July 3	@ Minnesota	L 47–56	Jennifer Gillom (18)	Marlies Askamp (12)	Michele Timms (3)	Target Center	3–7
11	July 7	Los Angeles	L 61–67	Jennifer Gillom (17)	Askamp; Gillom (7)	Michele Timms (7)	America West Arena	3–8
12	July 9	Houston	L 70–71	Michele Timms (22)	Marlies Askamp (6)	Michele Timms (5)	America West Arena	3–9
13	July 11	@ Los Angeles	L 58–67	Edna Campbell (17)	Jennifer Gillom (8)	Kristi Harrower (3)	Great Western Forum	3–10
14	July 12	@ Utah	W 80–66	Marlies Askamp (23)	Askamp; Davis-Wrightsil (6)	Michele Timms (5)	Delta Center	4–10
15	July 17	Los Angeles	W 84–76	Gillom; Harrower (20)	Marlies Askamp (11)	Kristi Harrower (5)	America West Arena	5–10
16	July 19	Houston	W 60–48	Jennifer Gillom (18)	Marlies Askamp (12)	Kristi Harrower (5)	America West Arena	6–10
17	July 21	@ Los Angeles	L 63–84	Jennifer Gillom (18)	Lisa Harrison (7)	Lisa Harrison (3)	Great Western Forum	6–11
18	July 23	Orlando	W 73–67	Kristi Harrower (16)	Askamp; Stepanova (8)	Kristi Harrower (5)	America West Arena	7–11
19	July 25	Washington	W 72–59	Jennifer Gillom (16)	Marlies Askamp (10)	Harrison; Timms (4)	America West Arena	8–11
20	July 27	Utah	W 86–73	Edna Campbell (21)	Marlies Askamp (9)	Kristi Harrower (7)	America West Arena	9–11
21	July 29	Minnesota	W 79–46	Jennifer Gillom (22)	Maria Stepanova (8)	Kristi Harrower (9)	America West Arena	10–11
22	July 31	@ Houston	L 70–77	Edna Campbell (15)	Marlies Askamp (11)	Michele Timms (8)	Compaq Center	10–12

August: 5–5 (Home: 5–1; Road: 0–4)

Game	Date	Team	Score	High points	High rebounds	High assists	Location Attendance	Record
23	August 2	@ Minnesota	L 56–73	Marlies Askamp (12)	Jennifer Gillom (8)	Michele Timms (7)	Target Center	10–13
24	August 6	New York	W 68–55	Jennifer Gillom (15)	Maria Stepanova (10)	Kristi Harrower (7)	America West Arena	11–13
25	August 7	@ Sacramento	L 60–71	Maria Stepanova (19)	Maria Stepanova (10)	Michele Timms (7)	ARCO Arena	11–14
26	August 9	Minnesota	W 64–55	Jennifer Gillom (15)	Maria Stepanova (13)	Harrison; Timms (4)	America West Arena	12–14
27	August 11	Detroit	W 68–57	Maria Stepanova (16)	Maria Stepanova (10)	Michele Timms (5)	America West Arena	13–14
28	August 13	@ Utah	L 64–67	Maria Stepanova (17)	Marlies Askamp (8)	Michele Timms (5)	Delta Center	13–15
29	August 15	Charlotte	W 65–54	Lisa Harrison (21)	Marlies Askamp (8)	Michele Timms (3)	America West Arena	14–15
30	August 17	Sacramento	W 71–59	Jennifer Gillom (28)	Harrison; Stepanova (9)	Michele Timms (10)	America West Arena	15–15
31	August 18	@ Houston	L 60–70	Jennifer Gillom (14)	Maria Stepanova (12)	Harrison; Harrower; Pettis (3)	Compaq Center	15–16
32	August 20	Utah	L 62–70	Gillom; Stepanova (17)	Maria Stepanova (11)	Gillom; Timms (3)	America West Arena	15–17

1999 season schedule

=== Season standings ===
Western Conference	W	L	PCT	Conf.	GB
Houston Comets ^{x}	26	6	.813	16–4	–
Los Angeles Sparks ^{x}	20	12	.625	12–8	6.0
Sacramento Monarchs ^{x}	19	13	.594	9–11	7.0
Phoenix Mercury ^{o}	15	17	.469	7–13	11.0
Minnesota Lynx ^{o}	15	17	.469	8–12	11.0
Utah Starzz ^{o}	15	17	.469	8–12	11.0

== Statistics ==
Legend
GP	Games played	GS	Games started	MPG	Minutes per game	RPG	Rebounds per game
APG	Assists per game	SPG	Steals per game	BPG	Blocks per game	PPG	Points per game
FG%	Field-goal percentage	3P%	3-point field-goal percentage	FT%	Free-throw percentage	TO	Turnovers per game
PF	Fouls per game		Team leader		League leader

=== Regular season ===
Player	GP	GS	MPG	FG%	3P%	FT%	RPG	APG	SPG	BPG	PPG
Jennifer Gillom	32	32	34.2	.381	.250	.797	5.8	1.7	1.2	0.2	15.2
Edna Campbell	28	24	26.8	.364	.376	.714	1.9	1.3	0.9	0.4	9.6
Michele Timms	30	29	26.8	.354	.348	.776	2.6	5.0	1.4	0.2	6.8
Marlies Askamp	30	30	26.0	.482	.000	.816	7.2	0.8	0.7	0.6	9.4
Lisa Harrison	32	23	25.9	.474	.100	.682	4.1	1.7	0.7	0.2	6.0
Kristi Harrower	32	3	20.8	.364	.279	.808	2.0	3.0	0.8	0.1	4.5
Clarissa Davis-Wrightsil	14	9	18.5	.433	.303	.667	2.7	1.4	0.9	0.3	9.3
Maria Stepanova	32	2	17.3	.485	.500	.625	5.1	0.8	0.4	1.9	7.8
Bridget Pettis	32	8	16.9	.304	.224	.617	1.8	1.4	0.8	0.1	5.7
Toni Foster	10	0	4.2	.583	N/A	.688	0.8	0.1	0.0	0.1	2.5
Angela Aycock	8	0	3.7	.000	.000	1.000	0.1	0,4	0.3	0.0	0.5
MerleLynn Lange-Harris	1	0	3.0	N/A	N/A	N/A	2.0	0.0	0.0	0.0	0.0
Amanda Wilson	12	0	2.8	.333	.200	1.000	0.5	0.2	0.1	0.1	1.0
Andrea Kuklová	5	0	2.6	.000	N/A	N/A	0.0	0.0	0.0	0.0	0.0

^{‡}Waived/Released during the season
^{†}Traded during the season
^{≠}Acquired during the season
