= 1997 Phoenix Mercury season =

WNBA team season

- Head coach: Cheryl Miller
- Arena: America West Arena

Results
- Record: 16–12 (.571)
- Place: 1st (Western)
- Playoff finish: Lost WNBA Semifinals

The 1997 WNBA season was the first for the Phoenix Mercury.

== Transactions ==
=== WNBA allocation draft ===
Player	Nationality	School/Team/Country
Jennifer Gillom	United States	Ole Miss
Michele Timms	Australia	WTV Wuppertal (Germany)

=== WNBA elite draft ===
Round	Pick	Player	Nationality	School/Team/Country
1	7	Bridget Pettis	United States	Florida
2	15	Nancy Lieberman-Cline	United States	Old Dominion

=== WNBA draft ===
Round	Pick	Player	Nationality	School/Team/Country
1	8	Toni Foster	United States	Iowa
2	9	Tia Jackson	United States	Iowa
3	24	Umeki Webb	United States	NC State
4	25	Monique Ambers	United States	Arizona State

=== Transactions ===
Date	Transaction
January 22, 1997	Drafted Jennifer Gillom and Michele Timms in the 1997 WNBA Allocation Draft
January 27, 1997	Hired Cheryl Miller as Head Coach
February 27, 1997	Drafted Bridget Pettis and Nancy Lieberman-Cline in the 1997 WNBA Elite Draft
April 28, 1997	Drafted Toni Foster, Tia Jackson, Umeki Webb and Monique Ambers in the 1997 WNBA draft
May 22, 1997	Signed Marlies Askamp and Tara Williams
June 20, 1997	Waived Ryneldi Becenti
July 22, 1997	Waived Molly Tuter
July 22, 1997	Signed Ryneldi Becenti
July 31, 1997	Traded future considerations to the Sacramento Monarchs in exchange for Mikiko Hagiwara

== Roster ==
1997 Phoenix Mercury roster
Players
Coaches

Pos.	No.	Nat.	Name	Height	Weight	DOB	From	Yrs
F	42	(United States)	Ambers, Monique	6' 4" (1.93m)		1970-12-21	Arizona State	R
C	14	(West Germany)	Askamp, Marlies	6' 5" (1.96m)	198 lb (90kg)	1970-07-08		R
G	4	(United States)	Becenti, Ryneldi	5' 6" (1.68m)		1971-08-11	Arizona State	R
F/C	0	(United States)	Foster, Toni	6' 1" (1.85m)	175 lb (79kg)	1971-11-16	Iowa	R
F/C	22	(United States)	Gillom, Jennifer	6' 3" (1.91m)	180 lb (82kg)	1964-06-13	Mississippi	R
G	24	(Japan)	Hagiwara, Mikiko	5' 9" (1.75m)	160 lb (73kg)	1970-04-27		R
F	3	(United States)	Jackson, Tia	6' 0" (1.83m)	148 lb (67kg)	1972-04-21	Iowa	R
G	10	(United States)	Lieberman-Cline, Nancy	5' 10" (1.78m)	150 lb (68kg)	1958-07-01	Old Dominion	R
G	32	(United States)	Pettis, Bridget	5' 9" (1.75m)	150 lb (68kg)	1971-01-01	Florida	R
G	7	(Australia)	Timms, Michele	5' 7" (1.7m)	132 lb (60kg)	1965-06-28		R
G	24	(United States)	Tuter, Molly			1975-08-25	Arizona State	R
G/F	21	(United States)	Webb, Umeki	5' 10" (1.78m)	162 lb (73kg)	1975-06-26	NC State	R
G	31	(United States)	Williams, Tara	5' 11" (1.8m)	170 lb (77kg)	1974-07-23	Auburn	R

Head coach
(United States) Cheryl Miller (USC)

Legend

- (C) Team captain
- (DP) Unsigned draft pick
- (FA) Free agent
- (S) Suspended
- Injured

== Schedule ==
=== Regular season ===
1997 game log
Total: 16–12 (Home: 11–3; Road: 5–9)
June: 2–2 (Home: 1–0; Road: 1–2)

Game	Date	Team	Score	High points	High rebounds	High assists	Location Attendance	Record
1	June 22	Charlotte	W 76–59	Bridget Pettis (17)	Toni Foster (8)	Michele Timms (6)	America West Arena	1–0
2	June 24	@ Houston	L 55–72	Toni Foster (13)	Askamp; Foster; Webb (5)	Umeki Webb (4)	The Summit	1–1
3	June 26	@ Cleveland	W 68–63	Gillom; Pettis (14)	Foster; Webb (7)	Michele Timms (4)	Gund Arena	2–1
4	June 29	@ New York	L 57–65	Jennifer Gillom (23)	Gillom; Webb (10)	Michele Timms (5)	Madison Square Garden	2–2

July: 6–6 (Home: 3–3; Road: 3–3)

Game	Date	Team	Score	High points	High rebounds	High assists	Location Attendance	Record
5	July 3	@ Utah	W 77–55	Jennifer Gillom (21)	Toni Foster (9)	Michele Timms (9)	Delta Center	3–2
6	July 7	New York	W 69–50	Bridget Pettis (25)	Jennifer Gillom (13)	Michele Timms (9)	America West Arena	4–2
7	July 9	Houston	W 66–53	Jennifer Gillom (20)	Marlies Askamp (10)	Umeki Webb (7)	America West Arena	5–2
8	July 12	@ Utah	L 51–52	Toni Foster (14)	Toni Foster (7)	Umeki Webb (3)	Delta Center	5–3
9	July 13	@ Los Angeles	W 57–56	Michele Timms (17)	Umeki Webb (6)	Michele Timms (3)	Great Western Forum	6–3
10	July 16	Sacramento	W 84–67	Jennifer Gillom (19)	Bridget Pettis (7)	Michele Timms (5)	America West Arena	7–3
11	July 21	@ Sacramento	W 70–57	Jennifer Gillom (19)	Toni Foster (11)	Michele Timms (7)	ARCO Arena	8–3
12	July 22	Houston	L 69–77	Michele Timms (24)	Bridget Pettis (7)	Bridget Pettis (4)	America West Arena	8–4
13	July 17	Los Angeles	L 83–86 (OT)	Gillom; Pettis (17)	Jennifer Gillom (9)	Michele Timms (9)	America West Arena	8–5
14	July 28	Cleveland	L 64–76	Jennifer Gillom (19)	Marlies Askamp (8)	Tia Jackson (4)	America West Arena	8–6
15	July 30	@ Charlotte	L 67–68	Jennifer Gillom (16)	Marlies Askamp (6)	Michele Timms (4)	Charlotte Coliseum	8–7
16	July 31	@ Cleveland	L 67–79	Askamp; Gillom (12)	Tia Jackson (8)	Nancy Lieberman-Cline (4)	Gund Arena	8–8

August: 8–4 (Home: 7–0; Road: 1–4)

Game	Date	Team	Score	High points	High rebounds	High assists	Location Attendance	Record
17	August 2	@ New York	L 70–80	Michele Timms (20)	Jennifer Gillom (9)	Michele Timms (6)	Madison Square Garden	8–9
18	August 4	Sacramento	W 83–60	Bridget Pettis (23)	Toni Foster (8)	Askamp; Foster; Pettis; Timms (3)	America West Arena	9–9
19	August 6	Utah	W 78–46	Michele Timms (18)	Askamp; Webb (9)	Michele Timms (7)	America West Arena	10–9
20	August 7	@ Houston	L 70–74	Michele Timms (24)	Foster; Timms (6)	Michele Timms (4)	The Summit	10–10
21	August 9	@ Charlotte	L 59–79	Bridget Pettis (14)	Toni Foster (7)	Bridget Pettis (3)	Charlotte Coliseum	10–11
22	August 12	New York	W 77–67	Jennifer Gillom (23)	Jennifer Gillom (8)	Michele Timms (7)	America West Arena	11–11
23	August 14	Cleveland	W 61–55	Jennifer Gillom (19)	Foster; Timms (7)	Michele Timms (6)	America West Arena	12–11
24	August 17	Utah	W 71–63	Jennifer Gillom (15)	Gillom; Timms (7)	Michele Timms (5)	America West Arena	13–11
25	August 18	@ Los Angeles	L 66–75	Jennifer Gillom (18)	Marlies Askamp (9)	Michele Timms (4)	Great Western Forum	13–12
26	August 20	@ Sacramento	W 69–54	Bridget Pettis (18)	Toni Foster (11)	Umeki Webb (4)	ARCO Arena	14–12
27	August 22	Charlotte	W 78–63	Bridget Pettis (27)	Jennifer Gillom (5)	Michele Timms (8)	America West Arena	15–12
28	August 24	Los Angeles	W 73–68 (OT)	Jennifer Gillom (29)	Askamp; Pettis (9)	Michele Timms (7)	America West Arena	16–12

1997 season schedule

=== Playoffs ===
1997 playoff game log
Semifinal vs. New York Liberty

Game	Date	Team	Score	High points	High rebounds	High assists	Location Attendance	Record
1	August 28	New York	L 41–59	Askamp; Gillom (9)	Jennifer Gillom (7)	Pettis; Webb (2)	America West Arena	0–1

1997 playoff schedule

=== Season standings ===
Western Conference	W	L	PCT	Conf.	GB
Phoenix Mercury ^{x}	16	12	.571	9–3	–
Los Angeles Sparks ^{o}	14	14	.500	8–4	2.0
Sacramento Monarchs ^{o}	10	18	.357	4–8	6.0
Utah Starzz ^{o}	7	21	.250	3–9	9.0

== Statistics ==
Legend
GP	Games played	GS	Games started	MPG	Minutes per game	RPG	Rebounds per game
APG	Assists per game	SPG	Steals per game	BPG	Blocks per game	PPG	Points per game
FG%	Field-goal percentage	3P%	3-point field-goal percentage	FT%	Free-throw percentage	TO	Turnovers per game
PF	Fouls per game		Team leader		League leader

=== Regular season ===
Player	GP	GS	MPG	FG%	3P%	FT%	RPG	APG	SPG	BPG	PPG
Michele Timms	27	27	35.8	.336	.345	.760	3.7	5.0	2.6	0.1	12.1
Jennifer Gillom	28	28	31.2	.434	.313	.777	5.4	0.8	1.3	0.5	15.7
Bridget Pettis	28	28	30.1	.334	.306	.898	3.8	2.8	1.8	0.4	12.6
Umeki Webb	28	17	27.7	.297	0.67	.687	4.2	2.4	2.4	0.3	5.0
Toni Foster	28	28	26.3	.468	.167	.704	6.1	1.0	1.9	0.8	8.8
Marlies Askamp	28	1	18.5	.393	.000	.763	5.2	0.8	0.8	0.3	7.5
Mikiko Hagiwara	12	5	15.5	.256	.286	.500	1.2	0.8	0.2	0.0	2.8
Tia Jackson	26	6	12.3	.342	.375	.840	2.2	1.0	0.9	0.3	2.8
Nancy Lieberman-Cline	25	0	11.2	.325	.231	.800	1.3	1.6	0.6	0.1	2.6
Ryneldi Becenti	1	0	8.0	N/A	N/A	N/A	0.0	0.0	1.0	0.0	0.0
Tara Williams	12	0	7.0	.410	.455	N/A	0.7	0.3	0.3	0.0	3.1
Monique Ambers	19	0	4.5	.444	N/A	.400	1.1	0.2	0.0	0.1	0.7
Molly Tuter	3	0	1.0	.000	N/A	N/A	0.0	0.0	0.0	0.0	0.0

^{‡}Waived/Released during the season
^{†}Traded during the season
^{≠}Acquired during the season

- Toni Foster ranked ninth in the WNBA in total rebounds with 172
- Toni Foster was ranked ninth in the WNBA in steals with 53.
- Toni Foster tied for seventh in the WNBA in blocks with 21.
- Toni Foster ranked seventh in the WNBA in Field Goal Percentage (.468)
- Jennifer Gillom ranked tenth in the WNBA in Free Throw Pct with .777
- Jennifer Gillom ranked fourth in the WNBA in field goals with 163
- Jennifer Gillom ranked fifth in the WNBA in points with 440 points.
- Jennifer Gillom ranked fifth in the WNBA in points per game with 15.7
- Bridget Pettis was tied for tenth in the WNBA in steals with 49.
- Michele Timms ranked third in the WNBA in minutes per game with 35.8
- Michele Timms ranked second in the WNBA in steals with 71.
- Michele Timms ranked third in the WNBA in assists with 137.
- Chantel Tremitiere ranked fourth in the WNBA in assists with 135.
- Umeki Webb ranked fourth in the WNBA in steals with 68.

== Awards and honors ==
- Jennifer Gillom, Center, All-WNBA Second Team
- Bridget Pettis: Led WNBA, Free Throw Percentage, .898
- Michele Timms: Third in WNBA, 3-Pt Field Goals, 49
