= Tara Williams (disambiguation) =

Tara Williams (born 1974) is a basketball player.

Tara Williams may also refer to:

- Tara Williams, a character from Sue Thomas: F.B.Eye
- Tara Williams, a character from This Life
- Finty Williams (born 1972), English actress
