= 1997 WNBA draft =

First player selection draft in league history

General information
- Sport: Basketball
- Date: April 28, 1997

Overview
- League: WNBA
- First selection: Tina Thompson; Houston Comets

The 1997 WNBA draft was the 1st draft held by the WNBA through which teams could select new players from a talent pool of college and professional women's basketball players. Unlike later drafts, this draft was unique because there were three different stages in which teams built their rosters.

First on January 22, 1997, the Initial Player Allocation draft took place in which 16 players were assigned to each team in no particular order.

The elite draft portion comprised professional women's basketball players who had competed in other leagues, usually international leagues. On February 27, 1997, an elite draft added two more players to each team. Michi Atkins (2nd Round, 11th overall pick) is the only player selected in the elite draft that never played a game in the WNBA.

On April 28, 1997, the four rounds of the regular WNBA draft took place. Racquel Spurlock (3rd Round, 17th overall pick) is the only player selected in the college draft that never played a game in the WNBA.

Draftees Cynthia Cooper, Sheryl Swoopes, and Tina Thompson would become the core pieces of the Houston Comets dynasty.

== Initial player allocation ==
!	Denotes player who has been inducted to the Naismith Memorial Basketball Hall of Fame
^	Denotes player who has been inducted to the Women's Basketball Hall of Fame
*	Denotes player who has been selected for at least one All-Star Game and All-WNBA Team
^{+}	Denotes player who has been selected for at least one All-Star Game
^{x}	Denotes player who has been selected for at least one All-WNBA Team
^{#}	Denotes player who never played in the WNBA regular season or playoffs
**Bold**	Denotes player who won Rookie of the Year

Count	Player	Position	Nationality	Team	School / club team
1	Vicky Bullett ^{+} ^	C	United States	Charlotte Sting	Maryland
2	Andrea Stinson *	G	United States	Charlotte Sting	NC State
3	Janice Lawrence Braxton ^	C	United States	Cleveland Rockers	Louisiana Tech
4	Michelle Edwards ^	G	United States	Cleveland Rockers	Iowa
5	Sheryl Swoopes * ^ !	F	United States	Houston Comets	Texas Tech
6	Cynthia Cooper * ^ !	G	United States	Houston Comets	USC
7	Lisa Leslie * ^ !	C	United States	Los Angeles Sparks	USC
8	Penny Toler	G	United States	Los Angeles Sparks	Long Beach State
9	Rebecca Lobo ^{+} ^ (Note: Lobo has also been inducted to the Naismith Hall, but as a contributor instead of player.)	C/F	United States	New York Liberty	Connecticut
10	Teresa Weatherspoon ^{*} ^ !	G	United States	New York Liberty	Louisiana Tech
11	Michele Timms ^{+} ^ !	G	Australia	Phoenix Mercury	WTV Wuppertal (Germany)
12	Jennifer Gillom ^{*} ^	C	United States	Phoenix Mercury	Ole Miss
13	Ruthie Bolton ^{*} ^	G	United States	Sacramento Monarchs	Auburn
14	Bridgette Gordon ^	F	United States	Sacramento Monarchs	Tennessee
15	Elena Baranova ^{+}	C/F	Russia	Utah Starzz	CSKA Moscow (Russia)
16	Lady Hardmon	G	United States	Utah Starzz	Georgia

Note: 16 players assigned in no particular order.

== Elite draft ==
The elite draft portion was composed of professional women's basketball players who had competed in other leagues, usually international leagues. It was the first time where the teams could draft the players out of a talent pool.

=== Round 1 ===
Pick	Player	Position	Nationality	Team	School / club team
1	Dena Head	G	United States	Utah Starzz	Tennessee
2	Isabelle Fijalkowski	C/F	France	Cleveland Rockers	Colorado
3	Rhonda Mapp	C/F	United States	Charlotte Sting	NC State
4	Kym Hampton ^{+}	C/F	United States	New York Liberty	Arizona State
5	Wanda Guyton	F	United States	Houston Comets	South Florida
6	Judy Mosley-McAfee	F	United States	Sacramento Monarchs	Hawaii
7	Bridget Pettis	F	United States	Phoenix Mercury	Florida
8	Daedra Charles^	C	United States	Los Angeles Sparks	Tennessee

=== Round 2 ===
Pick	Player	Position	Nationality	Team	School / club team
9	Wendy Palmer *	F	United States	Utah Starzz	Virginia
10	Lynette Woodard ^ !	G	United States	Cleveland Rockers	Kansas
11	Michi Atkins	F	United States	Charlotte Sting	Texas Tech
12	Vickie Johnson ^{+}	F	United States	New York Liberty	Louisiana Tech
13	Janeth Arcain * ^	F	Brazil	Houston Comets	Polti (Brazil)
14	Mikiko Hagiwara	G	Japan	Sacramento Monarchs	Japan Energy Griffins (Japan)
15	Nancy Lieberman ^ !	G	United States	Phoenix Mercury	Old Dominion
16	Zheng Haixia	C	China	Los Angeles Sparks	China

== College draft ==
=== Round 1 ===
Pick	Player	Position	Nationality	Team	School / club team
1	Tina Thompson * ^ !	F	United States	Houston Comets	USC
2	Pamela McGee ^	C	United States	Sacramento Monarchs	USC
3	Jamila Wideman	G	United States	Los Angeles Sparks	Stanford
4	Eva Nemcova ^{x}	G	Czechoslovakia	Cleveland Rockers	Bourges (France)
5	Tammi Reiss	G	United States	Utah Starzz	Virginia
6	Sue Wicks ^{+} ^	F	United States	New York Liberty	Rutgers
7	Tora Suber	G	United States	Charlotte Sting	Virginia
8	Toni Foster	F/C	United States	Phoenix Mercury	Iowa

=== Round 2 ===
Pick	Player	Position	Nationality	Team	School / club team
9	Tia Jackson	G/F	United States	Phoenix Mercury	Iowa
10	Sharon Manning	C/F	United States	Charlotte Sting	NC State
11	Sophia Witherspoon	G	United States	New York Liberty	Florida
12	Jessie Hicks	F/C	United States	Utah Starzz	Maryland
13	Merlakia Jones *	G/F	United States	Cleveland Rockers	Florida
14	Tamecka Dixon *	G	United States	Los Angeles Sparks	Kansas
15	Denique Graves	C	United States	Sacramento Monarchs	Howard
16	Tammy Jackson	F/C	United States	Houston Comets	Florida

=== Round 3 ===
Pick	Player	Position	Nationality	Team	School / club team
17	Racquel Spurlock ^{#}	C	United States	Houston Comets	Louisiana Tech
18	Chantel Tremitiere	G	United States	Sacramento Monarchs	Auburn
19	Katrina Colleton	G	United States	Los Angeles Sparks	Maryland
20	Tina Nicholson	G	United States	Cleveland Rockers	Penn State
21	Raegan Scott	F/C	United States	Utah Starzz	Colorado
22	Trena Trice	F/C	United States	New York Liberty	NC State
23	Debra Williams	G	United States	Charlotte Sting	Louisiana Tech
24	Umeki Webb	G/F	United States	Phoenix Mercury	NC State

=== Round 4 ===
Pick	Player	Position	Nationality	Team	School / club team
25	Monique Ambers	F	United States	Phoenix Mercury	Arizona State
26	Andrea Congreaves	F/C	United Kingdom	Charlotte Sting	Mercer
27	Kisha Ford	G/F	United States	New York Liberty	Georgia Tech
28	Kim Williams	G	United States	Utah Starzz	DePaul
29	Anita Maxwell	F	United States	Cleveland Rockers	New Mexico State
30	Travesa Gant	C	United States	Los Angeles Sparks	Lamar
31	Tajama Abraham	C	United States	Sacramento Monarchs	George Washington
32	Catarina Pollini	F	Italy	Houston Comets	Pool Comense (Italy)

== Notable undrafted players ==
These players were not selected in the 1997 WNBA draft but played at least one game for the WNBA.

Player	Position	Nationality	School / club team
Marcie Alberts	G	United States	Ohio State
Jenny Boucek	G	United States	Virginia
Rushia Brown	F	United States	Furman
Linda Burgess	F	United States	Alabama
Pietra Gay	G/F	Trinidad and Tobago	LSU
Kim Gessig	F	United States	USC
Nekeshia Henderson	G	United States	Texas
Mwadi Mabika *	G/F	Zaire	Tourbillon Kinshasa (Congo)
Yolanda Moore	F	United States	Ole Miss
Kim Perrot	PG	United States	Southwestern Louisiana
Tiffany Woosley	G	United States	Tennessee

== See also ==
- List of first overall WNBA draft picks
