= Kristi Harrower =

Australian basketball player (born 1975)

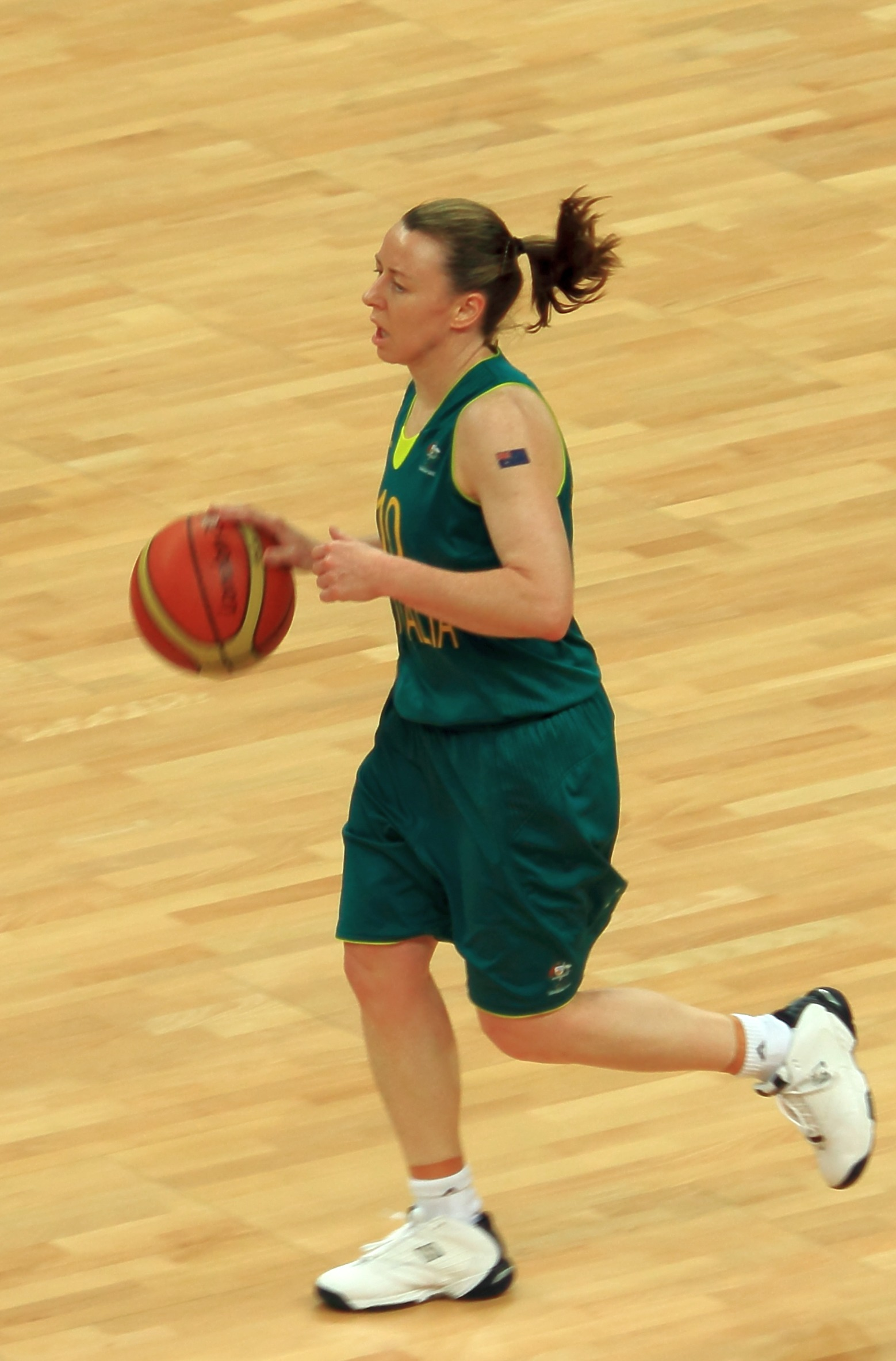
- Harrower with the Opals in 2012

Keilor Thunder
- Title: Head coach
- League: NBL1 South

Personal information
- Born: 4 March 1975 (age 51) Bendigo, Victoria, Australia
- Listed height: 163 cm (5 ft 4 in)
- Listed weight: 63 kg (139 lb)

Career information
- High school: White Hills (Bendigo, Victoria); Bendigo (Bendigo, Victoria)
- Playing career: 1991–2015
- Position: Point guard
- Coaching career: 2019–present

Career history

Playing
- 1991: Melbourne Tigers
- 1992–1993: Australian Institute of Sport
- 1994: Adelaide Lightning
- 1995–2000: Melbourne Tigers
- 1998–1999: Phoenix Mercury
- 2000–2001: Wuppertal
- 2001–2003: Minnesota Lynx
- 2002–2005: Aix-en-Provence
- 2005: Minnesota Lynx
- 2005–2007: Valenciennes
- 2007–2008: UMMC Ekaterinburg
- 2008–2015: Bendigo Spirit
- 2009: Los Angeles Sparks

Coaching
- 2019: Diamond Valley Eagles (assistant)
- 2019: Melbourne Tigers
- 2022–2024: Melbourne Boomers (assistant)
- 2024–present: Keilor Thunder
- 2024–2026: Southside Flyers

Career highlights
- As player: 3× WNBL champion (1994, 2013, 2014); French LFB champion (2007); WNBL MVP (2010); 7× WNBL All-Star Five (1997–2000, 2009, 2010, 2013); WNBL Defensive Player of the Year (2013); ACC All-Star Five (2007); As coach: NBL1 South Coach of the Year (2024)
- Stats at Basketball Reference
Medals
Representing Australia
Olympic Games
Silver medal – second place	2000 Sydney	Team competition
Silver medal – second place	2004 Athens	Team competition
Silver medal – second place	2008 Beijing	Team competition
Bronze medal – third place	2012 London	Team
World Championship
Gold medal – first place	2006 Brazil	Team competition
World Junior Championships
Gold medal – first place	1993 Seoul	Team competition

Kristi Harrower (born 4 March 1975), also known as Kristi Harrower-Willoughby, is an Australian professional basketball coach and former player. She was a decorated player with the Australian Opals, winning three silver medals and one bronze medal at four Summer Olympics. She played in the Women's National Basketball Association (WNBA) from 1998 to 2005 for the Phoenix Mercury and Minnesota Lynx.

== Early life ==
Harrower was born in Bendigo, Victoria.

== Playing career ==
=== Early years and profile ===
Harrower played as a point guard was listed as 163 centimetres (64 in) and 139 pounds (63 kg).

Harrower attended the Australian Institute of Sport on a scholarship in 1992 and 1993. At the 1994 Australian Under-20 national championships, Harrower won the Bob Staunton Award.

=== Professional ===
Harrower played professional basketball for over twenty years.

==== WNBA ====
Harrower entered the WNBA as an undrafted player. Her first team she played with was the Phoenix Mercury, whom she signed with before the start of the 1998 season. In her two seasons with the team, she played in 62 games. She joined the Minnesota Lynx in 2000 along with Mercury players Marlies Askamp and Angela Aycock as part of a trade that saw Tonya Edwards and Trisha Fallon go from Minnesota to Phoenix. She played for the Lynx in 2003, where she averaged 2.8 points and 2.3 assists per game. She ended her Lynx career in 2005 having played 96 games while averaging of 3.8 ppg, 2.4 apg and 1.8 rpg.

In 2009, Harrower was playing for the Los Angeles Sparks in the WNBA. She missed three games that season in order to attend her grandmother's funeral in Australia.

==== WNBL ====
Harrower's 18-year WNBL career began in 1991. After 10 years in the league, she was absent for seven years (2001–2007) before returning in 2008 and continued until retirement. Harrower was league MVP once (2009–10) and was selected seven times for the WNBL All-Star Five. She played on championship teams in 1994 with the Adelaide Lightning, and 2012–13 and 2013–14 with the Bendigo Spirit. In 2013, she was the WNBL Defensive Player of the Year.

Harrower played for the Bendigo Spirit in the 2008–09 season and the 2009–10 season, where she was the WNBL's MVP. She resigned with the Spirit in October 2009. With the Spirit in the 2010–11 season, she had a three-point shooting percentage of 23%. She played injured most of the season, with problems in her shoulder and knee. She averaged 13.8 points, 5.5 rebounds and 5.2 assists per game. She was the team's general manager that year. She again played for the Spirit in 2011–12. Her father, Bernie Harrower, was the team's coach. In January 2012, she made a clutch shot for her team that helped them beat Canberra. Harrower led the Spirit to league titles in 2013 and 2014. For the 2014–15 season, Harrower became an assistant coach for the Bendigo Spirit, but also returned as a player after injuries to guard Kelly Wilson prevented her from playing in the first part of the season.

On 7 January 2015, Harrower announced her retirement from the WNBL, also stating that she was 16 weeks pregnant.

==== Europe ====
In 2006, Harrower played for Valenciennes in France.

=== National team ===
Harrower was a member of the Australia women's national basketball team and has been described as the national team's pocket dynamo. She was a member of the 1998 Australian Senior Women's Team that won a bronze medal at the World Championships in Germany. She was a member of the 1999 Australian senior women's team.

She was a member of the 2000 Summer Olympics team that won a silver medal. Going into the Olympics, her team was ranked third in the world. In 2002, she was a member of the Australian Senior Women's Team that won a silver medal in the World Championships in Spain. She was a member of the Australian senior team that won a silver medal at the 2004 Summer Olympics. She played in eight games at the 2004 Games, where she averaged 8 points, 3.8 rebounds and 2.8 assists per game.

Harrower was a member of the 2005 Opals. In 2006, she was a member of the Australian women's senior team that won a gold medal at the World Championships in Brazil. In March 2007, she was named to the national team what would prepare for the 2008 Summer Olympics. In 2008, she did not participate in the Good Luck Beijing 2008 held in China in the lead up to the Olympics because of a commitment to her European club. She was a member of the 2008 Summer Olympics Australian women's team that won a silver medal at the Olympics.

In June 2010, Harrower was viewed by national team coach Carrie Graf as one of a quartet of strong players that would represent Australia in a tour of China, the United States and Europe in the next few months. In July 2010, she participated in a four-day training camp and one game test match against the United States in Connecticut. In 2010, she participated in the Salamanca Invitational Basketball Tournament in Spain. Her team beat Spain 85–64. They also beat the United States. She missed the game against Spain because she injured her ankle. In 2010, she was a member of the senior women's national team that competed at the World Championships in the Czech Republic. She missed a three-game test series against China in Queensland in July 2011 because of an injury. In July 2011, she participated in the Olympic qualification competition. She was returning to the team following an injury.

Harrower was named to the 2012 Australia women's national basketball team. In February 2012, she was named to a short list of 24 eligible players to represent Australia at the Olympics. She was scheduled to participate in the national team training camp held from 14 to 18 May 2012 at the Australian Institute of Sport. She made the 2012 Olympic Squad cut down to 14 players, and won the bronze medal.

== Coaching career ==
=== NBL1 ===
In December 2018, Harrower joined the Diamond Valley Eagles women's team as an assistant coach for the inaugural season of the NBL1 in 2019.

In May 2019, Harrower left the Eagles to take up the position of head coach of the Melbourne Tigers women's team for the final 10 games of the NBL1 season. Due to the COVID-19 pandemic, she was unable to coach the Tigers in 2020 and subsequently stepped down as coach prior to the 2021 season.

Harrower served as head coach of the Keilor Thunder women's team in the NBL1 South during the 2024 NBL1 season. She was named NBL1 South Coach of the Year. She re-signed with Keilor for the 2025 season. She continued as the Thunder women's head coach in 2026 and will again 2027.

=== WNBL ===
In July 2022, Harrower was appointed an assistant coach of the Melbourne Boomers ahead of the 2022–23 WNBL season. She continued as Boomers assistant in 2023–24.

In June 2024, Harrower was appointed head coach of the Southside Flyers ahead of the 2024–25 WNBL season. She parted ways with the Flyers in March 2026.

=== National team ===
Harrower served as an assistant coach of the Australian Opals at the 2023 FIBA Asia Cup.

In November 2026, Harrower was appointed an assistant coach for the Australian Boomers for two FIBA Basketball World Cup 2027 Asian Qualifiers, becoming the first woman to be part the Boomers' coaching staff.

== WNBA career statistics ==
Legend
GP	Games played	GS	Games started	MPG	Minutes per game	RPG	Rebounds per game
APG	Assists per game	SPG	Steals per game	BPG	Blocks per game	PPG	Points per game
TO	Turnovers per game	FG%	Field-goal percentage	3P%	3-point field-goal percentage	FT%	Free-throw percentage
**Bold**	Career best	°	League leader

=== Regular season ===
Year	Team	GP	GS	MPG	FG%	3P%	FT%	RPG	APG	SPG	BPG	TO	PPG
1998	Phoenix	30	0	11.8	.365	.344	.750	0.7	1.7	0.5	**0.1**	1.0	2.3
1999	Phoenix	32	3	20.8	.364	.279	.808	2.0	**3.0**	0.8	**0.1**	1.4	4.5
2001	Minnesota	4	1	18.0	**.467**	**.500**	**1.000**	1.0	2.8	0.8	0.0	0.8	**5.3**
2002	Minnesota	27	6	17.8	.389	.333	.400	1.7	2.0	0.4	0.0	1.0	3.6
2003	Minnesota	31	0	16.1	.368	.372	.615	1.3	2.3	0.6	**0.1**	1.3	2.8
2005	Minnesota	**34**	**34**	**24.5**	.351	.324	.778	**2.4**	2.8	**1.1**	0.0	1.6	4.6
2009	Los Angeles	31	26	16.8	.360	.205	.818	1.8	2.2	0.5	0.0	0.9	3.1
Career	7 years, 3 teams	189	70	18.1	.367	.316	.760	1.7	2.4	0.7	0.1	1.2	3.6

=== Playoffs ===
Year	Team	GP	GS	MPG	FG%	3P%	FT%	RPG	APG	SPG	BPG	TO	PPG
1998	Phoenix	**6**	0	13.0	**.600**	**.429**	.000	1.0	1.2	0.8	**0.2**	0.7	**4.5**
2003	Minnesota	3	0	**21.7**	.364	.286	**.500**	**2.3**	1.7	0.3	0.0	1.0	3.7
2009	Los Angeles	5	2	11.8	.500	.333	.000	0.2	**2.2**	0.4	0.0	0.8	2.6
Career	3 years, 3 teams	14	2	14.4	.512	.353	.500	1.0	1.6	0.6	0.1	0.8	3.6

== See also ==
- List of Australian WNBA players
- WNBL Defensive Player of the Year Award
