= Toni Foster =

American basketball player (born 1971)

Personal information
- Born: October 16, 1971 (age 55) Memphis, Tennessee, U.S.
- Listed height: 6 ft 1 in (1.85 m)
- Listed weight: 175 lb (79 kg)

Career information
- High school: Marshall (Chicago, Illinois)
- College: Iowa (1989–1993)
- WNBA draft: 1997: 1st round, 8th overall pick
- Drafted by: Phoenix Mercury
- Position: Forward

Career history
- 1997–1999: Phoenix Mercury

Career highlights
- Kodak All-American (1993); Big Ten Player of the Year (1993); First-team All-Big Ten (1991–1993)
- Stats at Basketball Reference

Toni Foster (born October 16, 1971) is an American former professional basketball player in the Women's National Basketball Association (WNBA). She was the eighth pick in the 1997 WNBA draft, selected by the Phoenix Mercury.

== College career ==
Foster played for head coach C. Vivian Stringer and the Iowa Hawkeyes. Foster helped the Hawkeyes reach the NCAA tournament each season she played in Iowa City, culminating with a trip to the program's first-ever Final Four to cap her career. During her four-year career, Toni was a force on the defensive end. She established a school-record for blocks in a career (now 6th on the list) and finished number two on the career rebounds list (now 6th).

== Professional career ==
Foster was selected with the 8th overall pick in the 1997 WNBA draft by the Phoenix Mercury. Her debut game was played on June 22, 1997 in a 76 - 59 win over the Charlotte Sting where she recorded 14 points, 8 rebounds, 3 steals and 2 assists. During the 1999 season, Foster was waived by the Mercury on June 9, 1999 but was signed to them again over a month later on July 19 and finished the season with the team.

She was drafted to the Seattle Storm on December 15, 1999 during the expansion draft. However, Foster never played for the Storm as she was waived in the preseason on May 15, 2000.

Foster played 54 games in her WNBA career, all 54 of them being played with the Mercury. Her final game ever was played on August 20, 1999 in a 62 - 70 loss to the Utah Starzz where she recorded 4 points and 1 assist.

== Career statistics ==
Legend
GP	Games played	GS	Games started	MPG	Minutes per game	RPG	Rebounds per game
APG	Assists per game	SPG	Steals per game	BPG	Blocks per game	PPG	Points per game
TO	Turnovers per game	FG%	Field-goal percentage	3P%	3-point field-goal percentage	FT%	Free-throw percentage
**Bold**	Career best	°	League leader

=== College ===
Year	Team	GP	GS	MPG	FG%	3P%	FT%	RPG	APG	SPG	BPG	TO	PPG
1989–90	Iowa	29	-	-	47.2	0.0	55.0	4.9	0.5	0.7	0.6	-	6.8
1990–91	Iowa	30	-	-	**55.4**	0.0	67.4	8.2	1.5	**1.9**	1.3	-	**15.8**
1991–92	Iowa	29	-	-	55.2	0.0	**70.1**	**8.4**	**1.8**	1.7	**1.6**	-	15.4
1992–93	Iowa	**31**	-	-	52.6	0.0	66.9	8.2	1.0	1.3	1.3	-	15.7
**Career**		119	-	-	53.4	0.0	65.6	7.5	1.2	1.4	1.2	-	13.5
Statistics retrieved from Sports-Reference.

=== WNBA ===
==== Regular season ====
Year	Team	GP	GS	MPG	FG%	3P%	FT%	RPG	APG	SPG	BPG	TO	PPG
1997	Phoenix	**28**°	**28**°	**26.3**	.468	**.167**	.704	**6.1**	1.0	**1.9**	**.8**	1.9	**8.8**
1998	Phoenix	16	5	13.6	.467	–	**.767**	1.9	**1.2**	.9	.3	.9	4.9
1999	Phoenix	10	0	4.2	**.583**	–	.688	.8	.1	.0	.1	**.4**	2.5
Career		54	33	18.4	.473	.167	.717	3.9	.9	1.2	.5	1.3	6.5

==== Playoffs ====
Year	Team	GP	GS	MPG	FG%	3P%	FT%	RPG	APG	SPG	BPG	TO	PPG
1997	Phoenix	1	**1**	**29.0**	**.333**	–	.500	**5.0**	**1.0**	**3.0**	.0	1.0	**7.0**
1998	Phoenix	**6**	0	8.3	.300	–	**1.000**	1.3	.8	.7	.0	**.3**	1.7
Career		7	11	11.3	.316	–	.833	1.9	.9	1.0	.0	.4	2.4
