= Mikiko Hagiwara =

Japanese basketball player (born 1970)

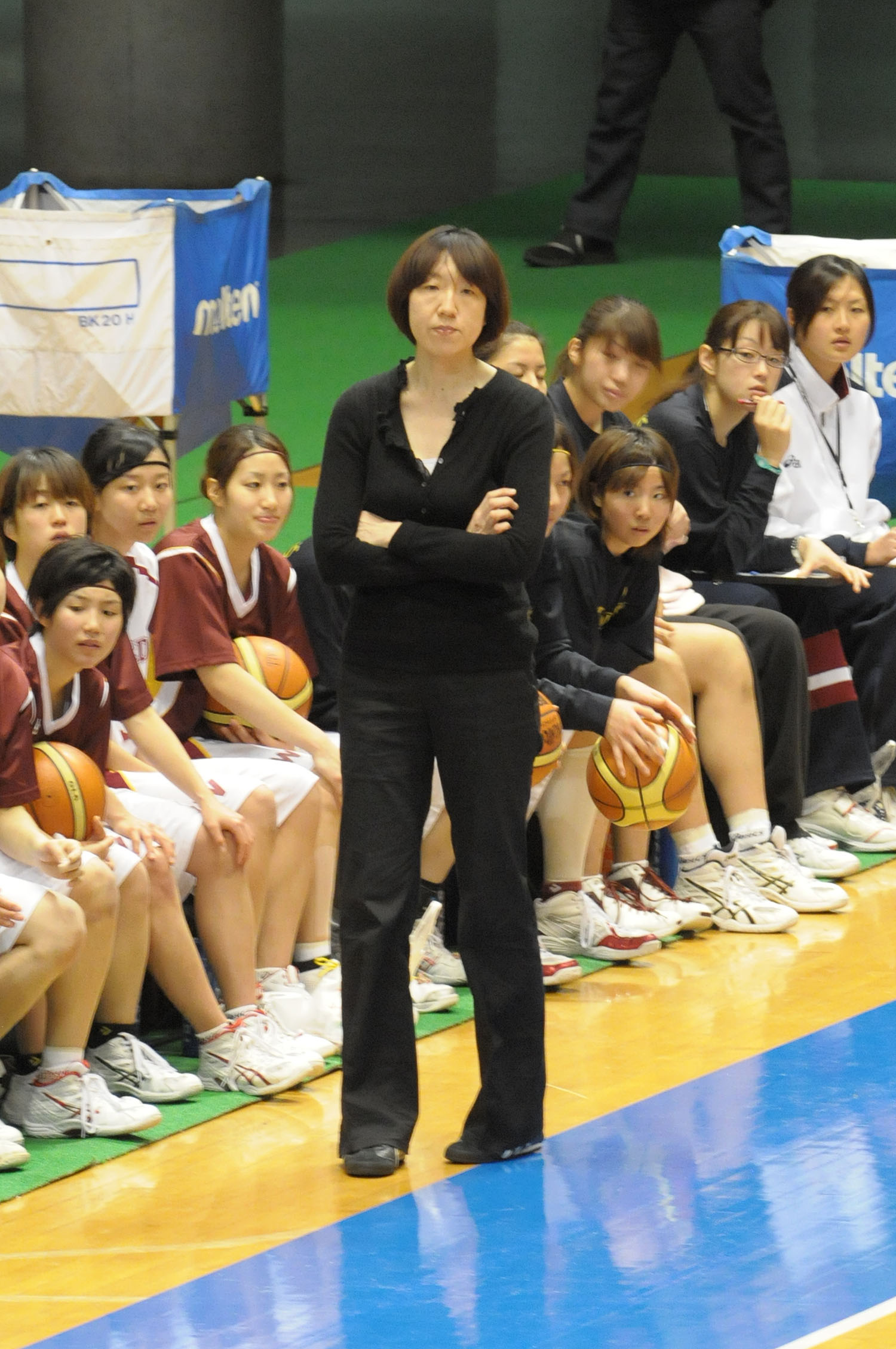

Personal information
- Born: April 17, 1970 (age 56) Fukushima, Japan
- Listed height: 1.80 m (5 ft 11 in)
- Listed weight: 73 kg (161 lb)

Career information
- WNBA draft: 1997: 2 (Elite) round, 14th overall pick
- Drafted by: Sacramento Monarchs
- Position: Shooting guard

Career history
- 1997: Sacramento Monarchs
- 1997: Phoenix Mercury
- Stats at Basketball Reference
Medals
Women's basketball
Representing Japan
Asian Games
Silver medal – second place	1994 Hiroshima	Team competition

Mikiko Hagiwara (萩原 美樹子, Hagiwara Mikiko; born April 17, 1970) is a Japanese former professional basketball player. She won a silver medal with the Japan women's national basketball team at the 1994 Asian Games. Hagiwara also competed at the 1996 Summer Olympics, where Japan's team came in seventh place. Hagiwara would also play in the WNBA for one year from June 1997 to July 1998.

Hagiwara was drafted by the Sacramento Monarchs with the 14th pick in the WNBA Elite Draft. Her WNBA debut took place on June 21, 1997 in a 73 - 61 win over the Utah Starzz where she recorded 3 points in 16 minutes of playing time. She was traded to the Phoenix Mercury on July 31, 1997 and played 12 games for them, averaging 2.8 points and 1.2 rebounds. She remained with the Mercury partially for the 1998 season, playing 10 games for them between June 26 - July 20, 1998 but played significantly fewer minutes (5.9 minutes per game) and averaged 2.2 points.

Hagiwara was waived by the Mercury on July 31, 1998 (exactly one year after being traded to the team) and would never play in the WNBA afterwards. Her final WNBA game was played on July 20, 1998 in a 88 - 67 win over her former team, the Sacramento Monarchs. Hagiwara recorded two points and no other stats in her final game.

== Career statistics ==
Legend
GP	Games played	GS	Games started	MPG	Minutes per game	RPG	Rebounds per game
APG	Assists per game	SPG	Steals per game	BPG	Blocks per game	PPG	Points per game
TO	Turnovers per game	FG%	Field-goal percentage	3P%	3-point field-goal percentage	FT%	Free-throw percentage
**Bold**	Career best	°	League leader

=== WNBA ===
==== Regular season ====
Year	Team	GP	GS	MPG	FG%	3P%	FT%	RPG	APG	SPG	BPG	TO	PPG
1997	Sacramento	**14**	2	12.4	.319	.273	**.667**	.6	.7	.1	**.1**	.6	**3.1**
1997	Phoenix	12	**5**	**15.5**	.256	.286	.500	**1.2**	**.8**	**.2**	.0	.6	2.8
1998	Phoenix	10	0	5.9	**.381**	**.333**	**.667**	.2	.3	.0	.0	**.5**	2.2
Career	2 years, 2 teams	36	7	11.6	.308	.288	.579	.7	.6	.1	.1	.6	2.7

==== Playoffs ====
Year	Team	GP	GS	MPG	FG%	3P%	FT%	RPG	APG	SPG	BPG	TO	PPG
1997	Phoenix	1	0	11.0	.500	.000	–	.0	.0	.0	1.0	3.0	2.0
