= Monique Ambers =

American basketball player and coach (born 1970)

Personal information
- Born: December 21, 1970 (age 55)
- Listed height: 6 ft 4 in (1.93 m)

Career information
- High school: James Logan (Union City, California)
- College: Arizona State (1989–1993)
- WNBA draft: 1997: 4th round, 25th overall pick
- Drafted by: Phoenix Mercury
- Position: Center

Career history
- 1997: Phoenix Mercury
- 2002: Sacramento Monarchs
- Stats at Basketball Reference

Monique Ambers (born 21 December 1970) is an American retired basketball player and coach. Ambers played for the Phoenix Mercury in the 1997 season and the Sacramento Monarchs in the 2002 season.

== WNBA career ==
Ambers was selected in the 4th round (25th overall pick) by the Phoenix Mercury in the 1997 WNBA draft. Her debut game was played on June 22, 1997 in a 76 - 59 victory over the Charlotte Sting where she recorded 1 point and 4 rebounds. Ambers played a reserve role for the Mercury and averaged only 4.5 minutes per game in the 19 games she played (along with 0.7 points and 1.1 rebounds). The Mercury finished with a 16 - 12 record and made the playoffs, but were eliminated in the semi-finals by the New York Liberty.

After her rookie season, Ambers missed the 1998, 1999, 2000 and 2001 WNBA seasons entirely. She would be waived by the Mercury on May 29, 1998 and did not get another shot at the WNBA until April 30, 2001 when she signed a contract with the Sacramento Monarchs. However, after missing the Monarchs first 3 games of the 2001 season, she would be waived on June 6 and not play for the team that year.

Ambers resigned with the Monarchs for the beginning of the 2002 season and although she missed the season opener, she played in the team's second and third games of the season. Her time with the Monarchs was short lived again, as after missing the team's 4th game of the season, she was waived on June 12, 2002.

The second game that she played for the Monarchs in the 2002 season ended up being her final WNBA game ever. The game was played on June 9, 2002 in a 62 - 75 loss to the Houston Comets, where Ambers played for less than two minutes and recorded no stats other than one foul.

== Career statistics ==
Legend
GP	Games played	GS	Games started	MPG	Minutes per game	RPG	Rebounds per game
APG	Assists per game	SPG	Steals per game	BPG	Blocks per game	PPG	Points per game
TO	Turnovers per game	FG%	Field-goal percentage	3P%	3-point field-goal percentage	FT%	Free-throw percentage
**Bold**	Career best	°	League leader

=== WNBA ===
==== Regular season ====
Year	Team	GP	GS	MPG	FG%	3P%	FT%	RPG	APG	SPG	BPG	TO	PPG
1997	Phoenix	**19**	0	**4.5**	**.555**	–	**.400**	**1.1**	**.2**	.0	**.1**	.4	**.7**
2002	Sacramento	2	0	2.0	–	–	–	.0	.0	.0	.0	**.0**	.0
Career	2 years, 2 teams	21	0	4.2	.444	–	.400	1.0	.2	.0	.1	.3	.7

=== College ===
Year	Team	GP	GS	MPG	FG%	3P%	FT%	RPG	APG	SPG	BPG	TO	PPG
1989–90	Arizona State	28	-	-	45.3	0.0	54.8	5.7	0.5	1.0	0.2	-	5.4
1990–91	Arizona State	28	-	-	53.7	0.0	47.2	8.2	**0.9**	1.4	0.6	-	9.4
1991–92	Arizona State	**29**	-	-	53.1	0.0	**68.5**	7.2	0.6	1.2	0.8	-	8.3
1992–93	Arizona State	27	-	-	**58.8**	0.0	65.1	**8.3**	0.5	**1.5**	**0.9**	-	**12.6**
**Career**		112	-	-	53.8	0.0	59.3	7.3	0.6	1.3	0.6	-	8.9
Statistics retrieved from Sports-Reference.
