= Bridget Pettis =

American basketball player and coach (born 1971)

Personal information
- Born: January 1, 1971 (age 55) East Chicago, Indiana, U.S.
- Listed height: 5 ft 9 in (1.75 m)
- Listed weight: 175 lb (79 kg)

Career information
- High school: Central (East Chicago, Indiana)
- College: Central Arizona College (1989–1991); Florida (1991–1993)
- WNBA draft: 1997: 1st round, 7th overall pick
- Drafted by: Phoenix Mercury
- Playing career: 1997–2006
- Position: Guard
- Number: 32
- Coaching career: 2014–present

Career history

Playing
- 1997–2001: Phoenix Mercury
- 2002–2003: Indiana Fever
- 2006: Phoenix Mercury

Coaching
- 2006–2009: Phoenix Mercury (asst.)
- 2014–2017: Tulsa Shock / Dallas Wings (asst.)
- 2019: Chicago Sky (asst.)

Career highlights
- All-SEC (1993); 2× WNBA champion (2007 & 2009); No. 32 retired by Phoenix Mercury
- Stats at Basketball Reference

Bridget Pettis (born January 1, 1971) is an American former college and professional basketball player who was a guard in the WNBA for eight seasons during the 1990s and 2000s. Pettis played college basketball for the University of Florida, and professionally for the Phoenix Mercury and the Indiana Fever of the WNBA.

== Early life ==
Pettis was born in East Chicago, Indiana. She attended East Chicago Central High School, and played high school basketball for the EC Central Cardinals.

== College career ==
Pettis attended Central Arizona College in Coolidge, Arizona, and played junior college basketball for the Central Arizona Vaqueras. She accepted an athletic scholarship to transfer to the University of Florida in Gainesville, Florida, where she played for coach Carol Ross's Florida Gators women's basketball team from 1991 to 1993. Memorably, she completed eight three-point shots against the Georgia Bulldogs on January 20, 1993—still the Gators' single-game record.

She graduated from the University of Florida with a bachelor's degree in 1993.

== Professional career ==
=== Phoenix Mercury (first stint) ===
The Phoenix Mercury selected Pettis in the first round (seventh pick overall) of the 1997 WNBA Elite Draft. Her debut game was played on June 22, 1997, in a 76–59 win over the Charlotte Sting where she recorded 17 points, 3 assists, 3 rebounds and 1 block.

For the first five seasons of her career, Pettis would be a productive member of the Mercury team. For the first two specifically, she was a starting guard averaging 12.6 points and 2.8 assists in her rookie season, then 11.3 points and 2.1 assists in her sophomore season. In her first playoff appearance on August 28, 1997, Pettis recorded 4 points, 6 rebounds, 2 assists and 2 steals, but the Mercury fell short to the New York Liberty 41–59 and were eliminated.

The next season in 1998, the Mercury finished 19–11 and made a deeper playoff run. In the semi-finals, Pettis recorded her first double-double of 27 points and 11 rebounds and helped the Mercury overcome the Cleveland Rockers in a 71–60 closeout game on August 25, 1998. Thanks to this victory, the Mercury would make it to their first WNBA Finals appearance. But the team would lose the series to the Houston Comets 2–1. This was Pettis' only Finals appearance.

Pettis remained on the Mercury for the 1999, 2000 and 2001 seasons, but she would mostly come off the bench, only starting in 15 of her 96 games played for those 3 seasons. Through those 96 games from 1999 to 2001, Pettis averaged 5.6 points, 1.4 assists and 1.8 rebounds in 16.8 minutes per game. The Mercury missed the playoffs in 1999 and 2001, but the 2000 season saw the Mercury finish with a then franchise record 20–12 and be matched against the Los Angeles Sparks in the semi-finals. Despite Pettis averaging 10.5 points, 3 assists and 2.5 rebounds in the series, the Mercury would be swept by the Sparks, including a 25-point loss in Game 2. This remained as the biggest playoff loss in Mercury history until the 2011 Western Conference Finals, where they lost to the Lynx by 28 points on September 22, 2011.

=== Indiana Fever ===
On March 4, 2002, Pettis would be part of the first four-team deal in WNBA trade history when the Mercury traded her and a 2002 1st-round pick (Tawana McDonald was later selected with this pick) to the Indiana Fever for Gordana Grubin. She played for the Fever for two seasons, coming off the bench for every game and averaged 2.6 points, 0.4 assists and 0.9 rebounds in 8.3 minutes for the team. During her second season with the team, the Fever reached the playoffs but were eliminated in the semi-finals by the Liberty in 3 games. This was Pettis' final playoff appearance and she averaged 5.3 points, 0.6 assists and 3 rebounds in those 3 games.

=== Phoenix Mercury (second stint) ===
Pettis completely missed the 2004 and 2005 WNBA seasons, but on April 20, 2006, she signed a contract with her former team Phoenix Mercury and played her final year with them. Pettis played in 11 of the team's first 12 games and averaged 1.3 points, 0.9 assists and 0.8 rebounds. Unfortunately, she was waived on June 29, 2006, causing her to retire shortly after. Pettis' final WNBA game was played on June 25, 2006, in a 90–77 win over the Chicago Sky where she played for 4 minutes and only recorded 1 steal as a statistic.

In her eight-season WNBA career, Pettis played in 228 games (starting in 71 games) and has career averages of 6.2 points, 2 rebounds and 1.4 assists in 17.1 minutes per game.

== Career statistics ==
Legend
GP	Games played	GS	Games started	MPG	Minutes per game	RPG	Rebounds per game
APG	Assists per game	SPG	Steals per game	BPG	Blocks per game	PPG	Points per game
TO	Turnovers per game	FG%	Field-goal percentage	3P%	3-point field-goal percentage	FT%	Free-throw percentage
**Bold**	Career best	°	League leader

=== WNBA ===
==== Regular season ====
Year	Team	GP	GS	MPG	FG%	3P%	FT%	RPG	APG	SPG	BPG	TO	PPG
1997	Phoenix	28	**28**	**30.1**	33.4	**30.6**	**89.8**	**3.8**	**2.8**	**1.8**	**0.4**	2.9	**12.6**
1998	Phoenix	30	**28**	28.3	**37.7**	28.5	86.5	3.4	2.1	1.0	0.3	2.1	11.3
1999	Phoenix	**32**	8	16.9	30.4	22.4	61.7	1.8	1.4	0.8	0.1	0.9	5.7
2000	Phoenix	**32**	6	18.2	35.7	26.7	80.3	1.9	1.4	1.0	0.1	1.2	5.9
2001	Phoenix	**32**	8	16.9	30.4	22.4	61.7	1.8	1.4	0.8	0.1	0.9	5.7
2002	Indiana	**32**	0	11.7	35.5	20.9	71.8	1.2	0.5	0.3	0.0	0.8	3.5
2003	Indiana	31	0	4.8	28.8	22.2	76.5	0.6	0.3	0.1	0.0	0.3	1.6
2004	Did not play (did not appear in WNBA)												
2005	Did not play (did not appear in WNBA)												
2006	Indiana	11	0	6.1	26.3	12.5	50.0	0.8	0.9	0.3	0.0	**0.2**	1.3
Career	4 years, 2 teams	228	71	17.1	34.1	27.0	80.9	2.0	1.4	0.8	0.1	1.3	6.2

==== Playoffs ====
Year	Team	GP	GS	MPG	FG%	3P%	FT%	RPG	APG	SPG	BPG	TO	PPG
1997	Phoenix	1	1	27.0	13.3	0.0	0.0	**6.0**	**2.0**	**2.0**	0.0	2.0	4.0
1998	Phoenix	**6**	**6**	**30.5**	**50.0**	20.0	78.9	3.7	2.2	1.8	**0.3**	1.8	**12.8**
2000	Phoenix	2	0	20.5	38.9	**45.5**	**100.0**	2.5	**3.0**	0.5	0.0	1.5	10.5
2002	Indiana	3	0	14.3	33.3	33.3	71.4	3.0	0.7	0.0	0.0	**1.3**	5.3
Career	4 years, 2 teams	12	7	24.5	40.7	27.6	78.6	3.5	1.9	1.2	0.2	1.7	9.8

=== College ===
Year	Team	GP	GS	MPG	FG%	3P%	FT%	RPG	APG	SPG	BPG	TO	PPG
1991–92	Florida	**27**	-	-	37.7	**31.9**	74.0	**4.8**	**2.8**	1.8	0.4	-	14.6
1992–93	Florida	26	-	-	**38.1**	30.7	**76.7**	4.7	2.3	**2.2**	0.4	-	**15.8**
**Career**		53	-	-	37.9	31.3	75.6	4.7	2.5	2.0	0.4	-	15.2
Statistics retrieved from Sports-Reference.

== Post WNBA ==
Pettis instantly joined the Mercury coaching staff as an assistant in 2006, helping the team win their first 2 championships in 2007 and 2009. She then served as the Mercury's director of basketball operations from 2010 to 2013.

In 2013, Pettis and Frank and Eddie Johnson started a club team called Team 2j Thunder. Three months later, Pettis was hired as an assistant coach for the LA Sparks.

On March 6, 2014, Pettis was named Assistant Coach for the Dallas Wings (then known as the Tulsa Shock). In October 2017 (after 4 seasons) Pettis announced her retirement from the Wings organization.

On January 23, 2019, Coach Pettis returned from retirement to accept a position as Assistant Coach with the Chicago Sky of the WNBA.

Prior to the 2020 season, Coach Pettis left coaching to focus on her Nonprofit organization Project Roots. The purpose of Project Roots is to educate and feed the homeless through a mobile kitchen service and local community garden. Pettis has described her mission for her nonprofit organization as “My mission is to end all homelessness in Phoenix and my hometown, through the help of our community gardens programs. This is the impact I want to leave for my community and my family.”

=== Relationship With Skylar Diggins ===
Notre Dame star and 2013 3rd overall pick Skylar Diggins has strongly credited Pettis for being a helpful mentor throughout her WNBA career. After averaging 8.5 points and 3.8 assists as a starter in her rookie season for the Shock, Diggins was very discouraged in continuing her WNBA career and felt that going overseas would be the better option. But it was Pettis who encouraged her to stay in the league and just work harder on her game.

In October 2022, Diggins announced that she was expecting her second child. This pregnancy caused her to miss the entire 2023 season and even further take time away from the league to focus on her health and her family. Initially, her time away from the league made her question whether or not she wanted to continue her WNBA career at all, due to complications of postpartum depression and weight issues. But Diggins has gone on record stating that Pettis' grace, compassion and helpful training has reignited her spark to continue her basketball career. Stating: “She pushed me...she got me back to that belief where I feel like now I feel stronger than I was before and I didn’t think that was possible. Going through postpartum stuff you just never know where you’re going to be. I can’t say enough about what Bridget means to this journey and just lighting another fire—like I’m coming for everything.".

== See also ==
- List of Florida Gators in the WNBA
- List of University of Florida alumni
