= Andrea Kuklová =

Slovak basketball player (born 1971)

Personal information
- Born: July 16, 1971 (age 55) Poprad, Czechoslovakia
- Listed height: 6 ft 0 in (1.83 m)
- Listed weight: 150 lb (68 kg)

Career information
- WNBA draft: 1998: 2nd round, 18th overall pick
- Drafted by: Phoenix Mercury
- Position: Guard / forward

Career history
- 1992–1993: TSV Weilheim
- 1993–1994: Lotus Munich
- 1994–1997: Aix-en-Provence
- 1997–1998: Tarbes Gespe Bigorre
- 1998–1999: Phoenix Mercury
- 1998–1999: Košice
- Stats at Basketball Reference

Andrea Kuklová (née Chupíková, born July 16, 1971) is a Slovak former professional basketball player who played in the WNBA and FIBA EuroLeague Women. She played for a team in Slovakia. She competed for Czechoslovakia in the women's tournament at the 1992 Summer Olympics.

== Career statistics ==
Legend
GP	Games played	GS	Games started	MPG	Minutes per game	RPG	Rebounds per game
APG	Assists per game	SPG	Steals per game	BPG	Blocks per game	PPG	Points per game
TO	Turnovers per game	FG%	Field-goal percentage	3P%	3-point field-goal percentage	FT%	Free-throw percentage
**Bold**	Career best	°	League leader

=== WNBA ===
==== Regular season ====
Year	Team	GP	GS	MPG	FG%	3P%	FT%	RPG	APG	SPG	BPG	TO	PPG
1998	Phoenix	**29**	**2**	**11.7**	**.400**	**.143**	**.556**	**1.3**	**1.1**	**.6**	**.1**	1.4	**3.3**
1999	Phoenix	5	0	2.6	.000	–	–	.0	.0	.0	.0	**.2**	.0
Career	2 years, 1 team	34	2	10.4	.388	.143	.556	1.1	.9	.5	.1	1.2	2.9

==== Playoffs ====
Year	Team	GP	GS	MPG	FG%	3P%	FT%	RPG	APG	SPG	BPG	TO	PPG
1998	Phoenix	4	0	10.8	.571	1.000	–	.5	.8	.8	.5	.0	2.3
