= Ryneldi Becenti =

American basketball player (born 1971)

Personal information
- Born: August 11, 1971 (age 55) Fort Defiance, Arizona, U.S.

Career information
- High school: Window Rock (Fort Defiance, Arizona)
- College: Scottsdale CC (1990–1991); Arizona State (1991–1993)
- Position: Guard

Career history
- 1997: Phoenix Mercury

Career highlights
- 2× All Pac-10 (1992, 1993); No. 21 retired by Arizona State Sun Devils
- Stats at Basketball Reference
Medals
Women's basketball
Representing USA
World University Games
Bronze medal – third place	1993 New York	Team competition

Ryneldi Becenti (born August 11, 1971) is a retired American professional basketball player. She became the first Native American to play in the WNBA when she played for the Phoenix Mercury in 1997.

== High school ==
Becenti attended Window Rock High School in Fort Defiance, Arizona, and in 1989, Scottsdale Community College in Phoenix. She was the country's top junior college point guard in 1990–91, and left Scottsdale a two-time NJCAA All-American.

== College ==
Becenti was an All-Pac 10 First Team selection in both her seasons at Arizona State University, and a two-time honorable mention All-America honoree. She also turned out for the US at the 1993 World University Games in Buffalo, New York, where her team won the bronze medal.

== Professional career ==
In 1995, Becenti was playing professional basketball in Sweden. She also played in Greece and, briefly, Turkey. She was the first Native American woman to play professional basketball for a foreign nation. In 1997, she signed with the Phoenix Mercury in the WNBA as a free agent and played in their inaugural season. In 1998, she was drafted by the Chicago Condors in the American Basketball League.

== Honors ==
In 1996, she became the first female basketball player to be inducted into the American Indian Athletic Hall of Fame.

in 2013, she was the first women's basketball player to have her jersey (No. 21) retired by ASU.

In 2023, she was inducted into the North American Indigenous Athletics Hall of Fame.

== Career statistics ==
Legend
GP	Games played	GS	Games started	MPG	Minutes per game	RPG	Rebounds per game
APG	Assists per game	SPG	Steals per game	BPG	Blocks per game	PPG	Points per game
TO	Turnovers per game	FG%	Field-goal percentage	3P%	3-point field-goal percentage	FT%	Free-throw percentage
**Bold**	Career best	°	League leader

=== WNBA ===
==== Regular season ====
Year	Team	GP	GS	MPG	FG%	3P%	FT%	RPG	APG	SPG	BPG	TO	PPG
1997	Phoenix	1	0	8.0	–	–	–	.0	.0	1.0	.0	1.0	.0

=== College ===
Year	Team	GP	GS	MPG	FG%	3P%	FT%	RPG	APG	SPG	BPG	TO	PPG
1991–92	Arizona State	**29**	-	-	36.6	28.1	68.9	**4.6**	6.9	**2.9**	**0.2**	-	13.2
1992–93	Arizona State	27	-	-	**37.9**	**34.0**	**72.9**	3.5	**7.2**	2.6	0.1	-	**14.0**
**Career**		56	-	-	37.3	31.3	70.3	4.1	7.1	2.8	0.2	-	13.6
Statistics retrieved from Sports-Reference.
