= Tia Jackson =

American basketball player and coach (born 1972)

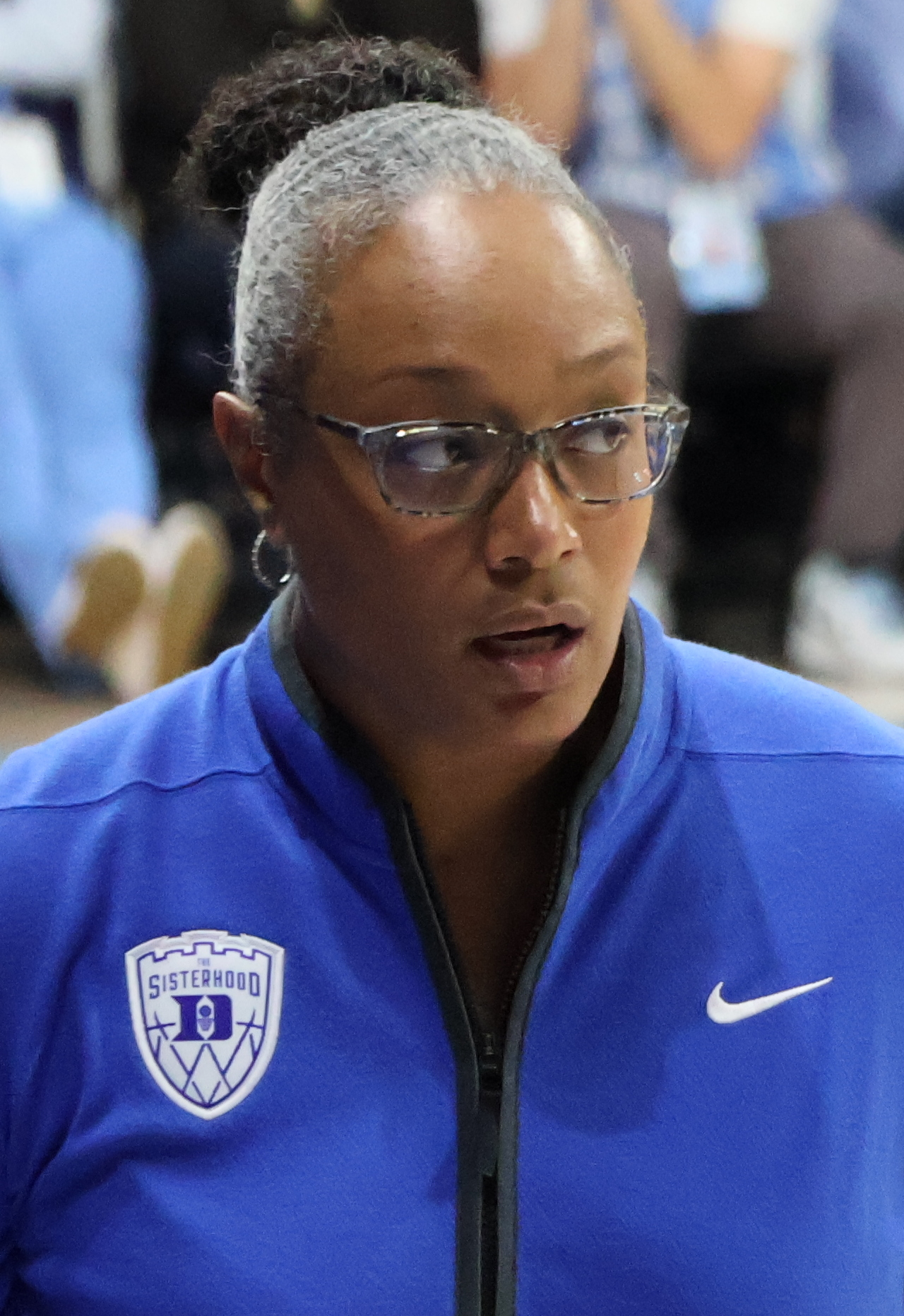
- Jackson with Duke in 2025

Duke Blue Devils
- Title: Associate head coach
- League: Atlantic Coast Conference

Personal information
- Born: April 21, 1972 (age 54) Towson, Maryland, U.S.
- Listed height: 6 ft 0 in (1.83 m)
- Listed weight: 148 lb (67 kg)

Career information
- High school: Mardela Springs (Mardela Springs, Maryland)
- College: Iowa (1990–1995)
- WNBA draft: 1997: 2nd round, 9th overall pick
- Drafted by: Phoenix Mercury
- Playing career: 1997–2012
- Position: Forward
- Number: 3

Career history

Playing
- 1997: Phoenix Mercury

Coaching
- 1996–1999: VCU (assistant)
- 1999–2000: Stanford (assistant)
- 2000–2005: UCLA (assistant)
- 2005–2007: Duke (assistant)
- 2007–2011: Washington
- 2011–2015: Rutgers (assistant)
- 2015–2020: Miami (Florida) (assistant)
- 2020–2022: Duke (assistant)
- 2022–present: Duke (associate HC)
- Stats at Basketball Reference

Tia Jackson (born April 21, 1972) is a former professional basketball player and a current associate head coach for Duke Blue Devils women's basketball team.

== Coaching career ==
Jackson was hired as an assistant coach for the Duke women's basketball program in July 2020. Jackson, who both played and coached in an NCAA Final Four, has been coaching for over two decades, with four years of head coaching experience. Jackson makes Durham, N.C., home for a second time as she spent the 2005–06 and 2006–07 seasons at Duke as an assistant coach, helping the Blue Devils to 63 victories and a trip to the 2006 NCAA championship game.

Jackson was hired as an assistant coach for the University of Miami women's basketball program on May 7, 2015. The Hurricanes eclipsed 20 wins and reached the NCAA Tournament in four of Jackson's five seasons with the team, including advancing to the Round of 32 on their home court twice (2017 and 2019). Miami held a 109–53 record during Jackson's tenure as an assistant coach for the Canes.

Prior to her time in Miami, Jackson spent four seasons as an assistant under Hall of Fame coach C. Vivian Stringer at Rutgers University.

== College ==
Jackson graduated in 1995. She spent five seasons at University of Iowa and helped lead the Hawkeyes to four top-25 rankings.

== WNBA ==
Following her assistant coaching tenure at Virginia Commonwealth University, she was drafted with the 9th overall pick of the 1997 WNBA draft by the Phoenix Mercury. Her debut game was played on June 22, 1997 in 76 - 59 win over the Charlotte Sting where she recorded 2 points, 3 rebounds, 2 assists and 2 steals.

During her rookie season, Jackson played with Nancy Lieberman, was coached by Cheryl Miller. She and the Mercury would make it to the Western Conference Championship game, ultimately falling to the New York Liberty.

Due to injuries, Jackson was unable to continue her career, and her rookie season with the Mercury ended up being her only season in the WNBA. Jackson played a total of 26 games in her career and averaged 2.8 points, 2.2 rebounds and 1 assist. Her final game ever was the aforementioned Western Conference Championship game on August 28, 1997 in a 41 - 59 loss to the Liberty where she recorded 2 rebounds and 1 assist but missed all four of her field goal attempts.

Jackson was waived by the Mercury on June 10, 1998.

== Personal life ==
Jackson earned a bachelor's degree in media studies and film.

== Career statistics ==
Legend
GP	Games played	GS	Games started	MPG	Minutes per game	RPG	Rebounds per game
APG	Assists per game	SPG	Steals per game	BPG	Blocks per game	PPG	Points per game
TO	Turnovers per game	FG%	Field-goal percentage	3P%	3-point field-goal percentage	FT%	Free-throw percentage
**Bold**	Career best	°	League leader

=== WNBA ===
==== Regular season ====
Year	Team	GP	GS	MPG	FG%	3P%	FT%	RPG	APG	SPG	BPG	TO	PPG
1997	Phoenix	26	6	12.3	.342	.375	.840	2.2	1.0	.9	.3	1.4	2.8

==== Playoffs ====
Year	Team	GP	GS	MPG	FG%	3P%	FT%	RPG	APG	SPG	BPG	TO	PPG
1997	Phoenix	1	0	8.0	.000	–	–	2.0	1.0	.0	.0	.0	.0
