= Marlelynn Lange-Harris =

Canadian basketball player (born 1969)

MerleLynn Lange-Harris
Personal information
- Born: 28 April 1969 (age 57) Toronto, Ontario, Canada
- Listed height: 6 ft 6 in (1.98 m)
- Listed weight: 195 lb (88 kg)

Career information
- High school: Emery Collegiate Institute (Toronto, Ontario)
- College: UNLV (1988–1992)
- Position: Center

Career history
- 1992–1993: Calais
- 1999: Phoenix Mercury

Career highlights
- Second-team All-BWC team (1991, 1992)
- Stats at Basketball Reference

MerleLynn Lange-Harris (first name also spelled Marlelynn; born 28 April 1969) is a Canadian former basketball player. A 6-foot-6 center, she played college basketball for UNLV from 1988 to 1992 and later professionally in Germany, with Calais in France and in the WNBA for the Phoenix Mercury.

== Early life ==
Lange-Harris attended Emery Collegiate Institute in Toronto, Ontario where she graduated in 1987.

== National team career ==
Lange-Harris competed for Canada in the women's tournament at the 1996 Summer Olympics and in the 1986, 1990 and 1994 World Championships.

== UNLV statistics ==
Ratios
Year	Team	GP	FG%	3P%	FT%	RBG	APG	BPG	SPG	PPG
1988-89	UNLV	33	46.8%	16.7%	58.6%	4.30	0.61	1.21	0.18	4.88
1989-90	UNLV	31	59.4%	-	58.1%	5.52	1.13	0.87	0.29	8.13
1990-91	UNLV	21	59.3%	-	69.2%	7.81	1.14	1.14	0.33	13.24
1991-92	UNLV	26	62.9%	-	64.9%	8.12	1.27	1.65	0.50	16.85
Career		111	58.1%	16.7%	63.6%	6.20	1.01	1.21	0.32	10.17

Totals
Year	Team	GP	FG	FGA	3P	3PA	FT	FTA	REB	A	BK	ST	PTS
1988-89	UNLV	33	72	154	1	6	17	29	142	20	40	6	161
1989-90	UNLV	31	101	170	0	0	50	86	171	35	27	9	252
1990-91	UNLV	21	112	189	0	0	54	78	164	24	24	7	278
1991-92	UNLV	26	171	272	0	0	96	148	211	33	43	13	438
Career		111	456	785	1	6	217	341	688	112	134	35	1129
