= Michele Timms =

Australian basketball player and coach (born 1965)

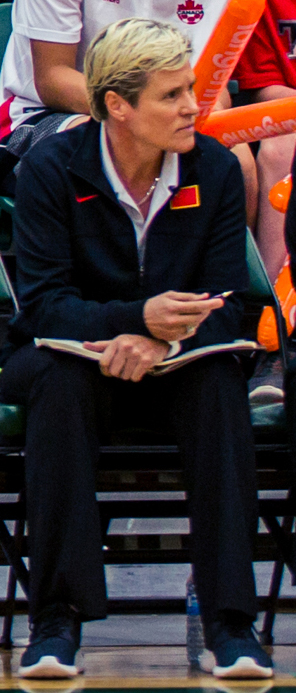
- Timms with the Chinese national team in 2016

Personal information
- Born: 28 June 1965 (age 61) Melbourne, Australia
- Listed height: 5 ft 7 in (1.70 m)
- Listed weight: 132 lb (60 kg)

Career information
- Playing career: 1984–2001
- Position: Point guard
- Coaching career: 2005–present

Career history

Playing
- 1984: Bulleen Boomers
- 1985–1990: Nunawading Spectres
- 1989–1990: Lotus Munich
- 1991–1994: Perth Breakers
- 1992–1993: Lotus Munich
- 1993–1994: Firenze Basket
- 1995–1996: Sydney Flames
- 1995–1997: BTV Wuppertal
- 1997–2001: Phoenix Mercury
- 1998–1999: Bulleen Boomers

Coaching
- 2005: Phoenix Mercury (assistant)
- 2007–2008: South Dragons (assistant)
- 2009–2011: Bulleen Boomers (assistant)

Career highlights
- As player: WNBA All-Star (1999); 5× WNBL champion (1986–1989, 1992); FIBA Women's European Champions Cup winner (1996); No. 7 retired by Phoenix Mercury; As coach: WNBL champion (2011)
- Stats at Basketball Reference
- Women's Basketball Hall of Fame
- FIBA Hall of Fame
Medals
Women's Basketball
Representing Australia
Olympic Games
Bronze medal – third place	1996 Atlanta	National team
Silver medal – second place	2000 Sydney	National team
World Championships
Bronze medal – third place	1998 Germany	Team competition

Michele Margaret Timms (born 28 June 1965) is an Australian basketball coach and former player. She played five seasons for the Phoenix Mercury of the Women's National Basketball Association (WNBA). She was inducted into the Women's Basketball Hall of Fame in 2008 and into the FIBA Hall of Fame in 2016.

In the Women's National Basketball League (WNBL), Timms made 285 appearances and won five championships.

== Professional career ==
=== WNBL ===
Timms debuted in the WNBL in 1984 with the Bulleen Boomers. She joined the Nunawading Spectres in 1985 and played six seasons for the club. Between 1991 and 1994, she played for the Perth Breakers. In 1995 and 1996, she played for the Sydney Flames. For the 1998–99 WNBL season, she returned to the Bulleen Boomers. She won four WNBL championships with Nunawading and one with Perth. In the 1992 season, Timms was captain of the Breakers team that won the championship.

=== WNBA ===
At the onset of the WNBA in 1997, Timms was assigned to the Phoenix Mercury in the initial player allocation. Her debut game was played on June 22, 1997 in a 76–59 win over the Charlotte Sting where she recorded 8 points, 6 rebounds, 6 assists and 2 steals. Timms had a very dominant rookie season with averages of 12.1 points, 3.7 rebounds, 5.0 assists and 2.6 steals per game. The Mercury finished with a 16–12 record and made the playoffs but were eliminated in the semi-finals by the New York Liberty.

For the 1998 season, Timms had a drop in all of her season averages except for assists. Recording a lower average in minutes played, points, rebounds and steals than her previous season. The Mercury was still able to complete the season with a 19–11 record and reach the finals but lost to the Houston Comets. Timms came within inches of giving the Mercury their first title; with the Mercury up 1–0 and needing only one more win for the championship, and Game Two tied at 66 with three seconds to go, Timms took a three-point shot that bounced off the rim's back. Ultimately, the Comets won that game 74–69 in overtime, and then the championship in Game Three.

The Mercury reached the playoffs with a 20–12 record in the 1998 season, but Timms only played 8 games that season and sat out of the playoffs as the Mercury lost in the semi-finals to the Los Angeles Sparks.

Timms bounced back and played more games in the 2001 season, playing in 21 games and averaging more points and assists than the previous season. But 2001 saw the Mercury have their worst record so far of 13–19. Timms' final WNBA game was played on August 14, 2001 in a 56–38 win over the Houston Comets where she recorded 10 points, 4 assists and 2 rebounds. That very same day (as it was the final game of the season and the Mercury were officially not making the playoffs), Timms announced her retirement and almost immediately joined the Mercury's television broadcasting crew, a job which she held only for that season.

On August 7, 2002, her number 7 jersey became the first to be retired by the Phoenix Mercury, and only the second jersey ever retired by the WNBA (the first being Kim Perrot). Upon her retirement, she was the Mercury's career leader in assists.

=== Europe ===
Timms played five seasons in Europe. Her first came in 1989–90 with German team Lotus Munich. She returned to Lotus Munich in 1992–93, played for Firenze Basket in Italy in 1993–94, and then played two seasons for BTV Wuppertal between 1995 and 1997. She won the FIBA Women's European Champions Cup with Wuppertal in 1996.

=== National team ===
Timms made 264 appearances for the Australian national team. She participated in four World Championships (1986, 1990, 1994, 1998) and three Olympic Games (1988, 1996, 2000). She won Olympic bronze and silver medals (1996, 2000) and a World Championship bronze medal (1998). She was captain of the Olympic team in 2000.

== Coaching career ==
Timms made her coaching debut in 2005 as an assistant coach with the Phoenix Mercury. In 2006, she joined the South Dragons of the National Basketball League (NBL) as a basketball development officer. She became an assistant coach for the Dragons in the 2007–08 NBL season. She quit as an assistant and development coach in January 2008 to go abroad for interviews for assistant coaching positions with two women's teams. She went to serve as an assistant coach of the China women's national basketball team (2008, 2013–2016); assistant coach of the Bulleen Boomers (2009–2011); and assistant coach of the Australia women's national basketball team (2009–2012).

== Honours ==
Timms was named the Women's International Player of The Year in 1994 and 1996. She received an Australian Sports Medal in 2000 and was inducted into the Sport Australia Hall of Fame in 2003. In 2008, Timms was inducted into the Women's Basketball Hall of Fame.

On 17 August 2016, Timms was inducted into the FIBA Hall of Fame.

Timms was made a Member of the Order of Australia in the 2018 Australia Day Honours.

On 6 April 2024, Timms was named to the Naismith Basketball Hall of Fame.

== Career statistics ==
Legend
GP	Games played	GS	Games started	MPG	Minutes per game	RPG	Rebounds per game
APG	Assists per game	SPG	Steals per game	BPG	Blocks per game	PPG	Points per game
TO	Turnovers per game	FG%	Field-goal percentage	3P%	3-point field-goal percentage	FT%	Free-throw percentage
**Bold**	Career best	°	League leader

=== Regular season ===
Year	Team	GP	GS	MPG	FG%	3P%	FT%	RPG	APG	SPG	BPG	TO	PPG
1997	Phoenix	27	27	**35.8**	.336	.345	.760	**3.7**	5.1	**2.6**	0.1	**3.0**	**12.1**
1998	Phoenix	**30**	**30**	31.1	.318	.298	.694	2.5	**5.3**	1.3	0.1	2.3	6.9
1999	Phoenix	30	29	26.8	.354	**.348**	.776	2.6	5.0	1.4	0.2	**3.0**	6.8
2000	Phoenix	8	8	22.0	**.367**	.235	**1.000**	2.0	2.3	1.9	**0.3**	2.3	3.8
2001	Phoenix	21	18	19.4	.345	.304	.800	2.1	4.1	1.0	0.1	2.0	4.7
Career	5 years, 1 team	116	112	28.3	.338	.324	.755	2.7	4.8	1.6	0.2	2.6	6.0

=== Playoffs ===
Year	Team	GP	GS	MPG	FG%	3P%	FT%	RPG	APG	SPG	BPG	TO	PPG
1997	Phoenix	1	1	**40.0**	.091	.000	.600	4.0	1.0	**4.0**	0.0	2.0	5.0
1998	Phoenix	**6**	**6**	34.7	**.352**	**.273**	**1.000**	3.3	**5.2**	0.8	0.0	**3.5**	**9.0**
Career	2 years, 1 team	7	7	35.4	.308	.250	.867	3.4	4.6	1.3	0.0	3.3	8.4

== See also ==
- List of Australian WNBA players
