= Umeki Webb =

American basketball player (born 1975)

Personal information
- Born: June 26, 1975 (age 51) Dallas, Texas
- Listed height: 5 ft 10 in (1.78 m)
- Listed weight: 162 lb (73 kg)

Career information
- High school: Justin F. Kimball (Dallas, Texas)
- College: NC State (1993–1997)
- WNBA draft: 1997: 3rd round, 24th overall pick
- Drafted by: Phoenix Mercury
- Position: Guard / forward
- Number: 21

Career history
- 1997–1998: Phoenix Mercury
- 2000: Miami Sol
- Stats at Basketball Reference
Medals
Women's basketball
Representing the United States
Pan American Games
Bronze medal – third place	1999 Winnipeg	Team

Umeki Webb (born June 26, 1975) is a former professional basketball player in the Women's National Basketball Association (WNBA) for three seasons, playing two for the Phoenix Mercury and one for the Miami Sol.

== WNBA career ==
Webb was selected in the 3rd round (24th overall pick) by the Phoenix Mercury in the 1997 WNBA draft. Her debut game was played on June 22, 1997 in a 76 - 59 win over the Charlotte Sting where she recorded 9 points, 5 assists, 2 rebounds and 2 steals. Webb averaged a hefty 27.7 minutes a game in her rookie season, along with 5 points, 4.2 rebounds, 2.4 assists and 2.4 steals. The Mercury finished the season 16 - 12 and made the playoffs but were eliminated in the semi-finals by the New York Liberty.

In the 1998 season, Webb averaged more minutes, more points and more assists than her rookie season, but averaged less rebounds and steals (28.2 mpg, 5.3 ppg, 3.9 apg, 3.9 rpg and 1.6 spg). The Mercury finished with an even better record of 19 - 11 and made it all the way to the WNBA Finals, but would ultimately fall to the Houston Comets who won their 2nd championship that year.

After being waived on July 8, 1999, 4 days before the Mercury were to have their season-opening game on July 12, Webb would miss the 1999 season entirely.

Webb would be one of the players on the newly created Miami Sol expansion team in 2000. She missed 19 of the Sol's 32 games (16 consecutive games from June 17 and July 21) and had a smaller role on the Sol than what she had with the Mercury. Webb averaged 15 minutes per game, 3.3 points, 1.1 rebounds and 1.1 assists. However, the Sol finished 13 - 19 and missed the playoffs.

The Sol would waive Webb on May 14, 2001, a couple of weeks before the 2001 season was set to begin. She would not return to the WNBA after being waived, and thus, her final game ever was played on August 6, 2000. On that day, the Sol defeated the Liberty 57 - 41.

== Career statistics ==
Legend
GP	Games played	GS	Games started	MPG	Minutes per game	RPG	Rebounds per game
APG	Assists per game	SPG	Steals per game	BPG	Blocks per game	PPG	Points per game
TO	Turnovers per game	FG%	Field-goal percentage	3P%	3-point field-goal percentage	FT%	Free-throw percentage
**Bold**	Career best	°	League leader

=== College ===
Year	Team	GP	Points	FG%	3P%	FT%	RPG	APG	SPG	BPG	PPG
1992-93	NC State	27	274	36.7%	26.0%	**73.5%**	3.8	2.4	2.1	**0.7**	10.1
1993-94	NC State	**31**	322	46.4%	**37.3%**	54.2%	5.4	3.3	2.3	0.7	10.4
1994-95	NC State	30	374	42.4%	26.7%	70.9%	**7.7**	**4.6**	2.0	0.7	12.5
1995-96	NC State	**31**	**392**	**47.0%**	23.8%	69.0%	7.6	4.5	**2.4**	0.5	**12.6**
Total		119	1362	43.2%	28.6%	67.4%	6.2	3.7	2.2	0.6	11.4

=== WNBA ===
==== Regular season ====
Year	Team	GP	GS	MPG	FG%	3P%	FT%	RPG	APG	SPG	BPG	TO	PPG
1997	Phoenix	28°	17	27.7	.297	.067	.687	**4.2**	2.4	**2.4**	.3	**2.0**	5.0
1998	Phoenix	30°	30°	**28.2**	**.383**	**.286**	.661	3.9	**3.1**	1.6	**.7**	**1.4**	**5.3**
2000	Miami	13	5	15.0	.250	.250	**.840**	1.1	1.1	.5	.3	1.8	3.3
Career	3 years, 2 teams	71	52	25.6	.321	.189	.702	3.5	2.5	1.7	.5	1.7	4.8

==== Playoffs ====
Year	Team	GP	GS	MPG	FG%	3P%	FT%	RPG	APG	SPG	BPG	TO	PPG
1997	Phoenix	1	1	**33.0**	.222	–	.500	**6.0**	2.0	.0	.0	**1.0**	**5.0**
2021	Seattle	**6**	**6**	**26.3**	**.286**	**.200**	**.600**	2.5	**3.0**	**.2**	**.3**	1.5	2.7
Career	2 years, 1 team	7	7	27.3	.267	.200	.571	3.0	2.9	.1	.3	1.4	3.0
