= Jennifer Gillom =

American basketball player and coach (born 1964)

Personal information
- Born: June 13, 1964 (age 62) Abbeville, Mississippi, U.S.
- Listed height: 6 ft 3 in (1.91 m)
- Listed weight: 180 lb (82 kg)

Career information
- High school: Lafayette (Oxford, Mississippi)
- College: Ole Miss (1982–1986)
- WNBA draft: 1997: Allocated round
- Drafted by: Phoenix Mercury
- Playing career: 1997–2003
- Position: Forward - Center
- Coaching career: 2004–present

Career history

Playing
- 1997–2002: Phoenix Mercury
- 2003: Los Angeles Sparks

Coaching
- 2004–2010, 2017-current: Xavier College Preparatory
- 2008: Minnesota Lynx (assistant)
- 2009: Minnesota Lynx
- 2010–2011: Los Angeles Sparks
- 2012: Washington Mystics (assistant)
- 2013–2015: Connecticut Sun (assistant)

Career highlights
- WNBA All-Star (1999); All-WNBA First Team (1998); All-WNBA Second Team (1997); No. 22 retired by Phoenix Mercury; Kim Perrot Sportsmanship Award (2002); Kodak All-American (1986); SEC Female Athlete of the Year (1986); USA Basketball Female Athlete of the Year (1985); Mississippi Miss Basketball (1982)
- Stats at Basketball Reference
- Women's Basketball Hall of Fame
Medals
Women's Basketball
Representing the United States
Pan American Games
Gold medal – first place	1987 Indianapolis	Team
World University Games
Gold medal – first place	1985 Kobe	Team competition
FIBA World Championship for Women
Gold medal – first place	1986 Moscow	Team competition
Olympic Games
Gold medal – first place	1988 Seoul	Team competition
Assistant Coach for Women's Basketball
Representing the United States
Olympic Games
Gold medal – first place	2012 London	Team competition
FIBA World Championship for Women
Gold medal – first place	2010 Brazil	Team competition

Jennifer "Grandmama" Gillom (born June 13, 1964) is an American former Women's National Basketball Association (WNBA) basketball player who played for the Phoenix Mercury from 1997 to 2002, before finishing her playing career with the Los Angeles Sparks in 2003. Gillom is also a former Sparks head coach, also coached the Minnesota Lynx, and was, until 2015, an assistant coach of the Connecticut Sun.

Born in Abbeville, Mississippi, Gillom played college basketball at the University of Mississippi and helped the United States Basketball Team to a gold medal in women's basketball in the 1988 Summer Olympics. Gillom signed with the Mercury in 1997 where she was All-WNBA in 1999 and won the Kim Perrot Sportsmanship Award in her final season.

Gillom became the head coach of the Xavier College Preparatory High School basketball team in Phoenix, Arizona in 2004. Starting in the 2008 season, Gillom served as an assistant coach for the Minnesota Lynx. In June 2009, she was named head coach of the Lynx and stayed as the head coach until the end of 2009 when she was succeeded by Cheryl Reeve.

In 2009, Gillom was inducted into the Women's Basketball Hall of Fame, located in Knoxville, Tennessee. The Gillom Athletics Performance Center on the Ole Miss campus is named for Gillom and her sister Peggie Gillom-Granderson, also an Ole Miss former outstanding player.

== Ole Miss ==
Legend
GP	Games played	GS	Games started	MPG	Minutes per game
FG%	Field goal percentage	3P%	3-point field goal percentage	FT%	Free throw percentage
RPG	Rebounds per game	APG	Assists per game	SPG	Steals per game
BPG	Blocks per game	PPG	Points per game	**Bold**	Career high

Year	Team	G	FG-FGA	PCT	3P-A	PCT	FT-FTA	PCT	RB-AVG	TP-AVG	A	B	S
1982-83	Ole Miss	32	139-301	0.462	---	---	37-67	0.552	198-6.2	315-9.8	**65**	29	**41**
1983-84	Ole Miss	30	244-471	0.518	---	---	58-100	0.58	**272-9.1**	546-18.2	31	22	38
1984-85	Ole Miss	32	246-460	0.535	---	---	91-135	**0.674**	231-7.2	583-18.2	30	26	28
1985-86	Ole Miss	32	314-577	**0.544**	---	---	113-181	0.624	254-7.9	**742-23.2**	11	**35**	39
TOTALS		126	943-1809	0.521	---	---	299-483	0.619	955-7.6	2186-17.3	137	112	146

== USA Basketball ==
=== Player ===
Gillom played for the USA World University Games team in Kobe, Japan in 1985. The team brought home a silver medal, after falling to the USSR. The team trailed by 18 points at one time, mounted a comeback attempt but fell short, losing 87–81. Gillom was the second leading scorer for the USA team, with 12.8 points per game. The following year, Gillom played for the USA team at the World Championships, in Moscow. This time, the USA team would meet the USSR in the title game and emerge victorious, winning the gold medal with a score of 108–88. Gillom averaged 2.8 points per game.

Gillom was named to the team representing the US at the 1987 Pan American Games, held in Indianapolis, Indiana in August. The USA team won all four of their games winning the gold medal for the event. She averaged 9.5 points per game. Gillom continued with the national team at the 1988 Olympics in Seoul, South Korea, held in September. The team won all five games which resulted in the gold medal. Gillom averaged 2.8 points per game.

=== Coach ===
Gillom was named assistant coach of the USA National team in preparation for competition in the 2010 World Championships and 2012 Olympics. Because many team members were still playing in the WNBA until just prior to the event, the team had only one day of practice with the entire team before leaving for Ostrava and Karlovy Vary, Czech Republic. Even with limited practice, the team managed to win their first game against Greece by 26 points. The team continued to dominate with victory margins exceeding 20 points in the first five games. Several players shared scoring honors, with Swin Cash, Angel McCoughtry, Maya Moore, Diana Taurasi, Lindsay Whalen, and Sylvia Fowles all ending as high scorer in the first few games. The sixth game was against undefeated Australia—the USA jumped out to a 24-point lead, but the Australian team cut the lead back to single digits late in the game. The USA prevailed 83–75. The USA won their next two games by over thirty points, then faced the host team, the Czech Republic, in the championship game. The USA team had only a five-point lead at halftime, which was cut to three points, but the Czechs never got closer, and went on to win the championship and gold medal.

She continued as an assistant at the 2012 Olympics in London.

== WNBA ==
Gillom was selected in the initial player allocation on January 22, 1997 to participate in the WNBA's inaugural season. She was assigned to the Phoenix Mercury and her debut game was played on June 22, 1997 in a 76 - 59 win over the Charlotte Sting where she recorded 4 points, 5 rebounds and 2 assists. Gillom would be a consistent starter for Phoenix for six seasons from 1997 to 2002, playing in 183 games for the club and starting in all of them. Throughout that 183 games and six seasons, Gillom averaged 15.3 points and 5.0 rebounds. She made the All-Star Team in 1999 and during the All-Star Game on July 14, 1999, helped the Western Conference to a 79 - 61 victory with 6 points, 5 rebounds, 1 assist and 1 steal of her own.

The Mercury reached the playoffs in 3 of the 6 seasons that Gillom was on the team. In 1997 the team was eliminated in the Semi-Finals by the New York Liberty, in 1998 they would reach the Finals but would lose 2 - 1 to the Houston Comets and in 2000 they were swept in the Semi-Finals by the Los Angeles Sparks. The Mercury would go on a continuous slump as a franchise from 2001 to 2003, having a worse record every year than the year before. The team finished with regular season records of 13 - 19 in 2001 and 11 - 21 in 2002. However, for the year 2003 when the team finished 8 - 26, Gillom would not be on the roster as she spent this season as a member of Sparks, signing with the team as an unrestricted free agent May 1, 2003. At the time when Gillom departed from Phoenix, she was the 2nd-leading scorer in league history.

As a member of the Sparks, Gillom played in 33 of the team's 34 games but played in much less minutes than she did during her time on the Mercury. She averaged 3.1 points and 1.7 rebounds playing in only 12 minutes a game (after averaging 30 minutes in Phoenix). The Sparks finished 24 - 10 and Gillom would reach the Finals for the 2nd time in her career. The Sparks were matched up against the Detroit Shock and although they won Game 1 by an impressive 12 points (75 - 63), the team would lose the next two games by 1 point and 5 points respectively. The Sparks missed out on completing a 3-peat as they had just won the previous two titles in 2001 and 2002. Gillom only played in Game 2 of this Finals series and sat out for Game 1 and Game 3.

That 2003 season with the Sparks would be Gillom's only season with the team and her last season in the league entirely as she retired after the crushing loss to Detroit in the Finals. Her final WNBA game was played in Game 2 of the 2003 WNBA Finals on September 14, 2003 in a 61 - 62 loss to the Detroit Shock where she played for only 65 seconds and recorded no stats.

== Career statistics ==
Legend
GP	Games played	GS	Games started	MPG	Minutes per game	RPG	Rebounds per game
APG	Assists per game	SPG	Steals per game	BPG	Blocks per game	PPG	Points per game
TO	Turnovers per game	FG%	Field-goal percentage	3P%	3-point field-goal percentage	FT%	Free-throw percentage
**Bold**	Career best	°	League leader

=== Regular season ===
Year	Team	GP	GS	MPG	FG%	3P%	FT%	RPG	APG	SPG	BPG	TO	PPG
1997	Phoenix	28	28	31.2	.434	.308	.777	5.4	0.8	1.3	0.5	2.0	15.7
1998	Phoenix	30	30	32.1	**.463**	**.378**	.703	**7.3**	1.4	**1.7**	0.3	**3.0**	**20.8**
1999	Phoenix	**32**	**32**	**34.2**	.381	.250	.797	5.8	**1.7**	1.2	0.2	2.7	15.2
2000	Phoenix	30	30	27.5	.440	.275	.745	3.9	1.5	0.7	**1.0**	2.0	12.5
2001	Phoenix	**32**	**32**	26.8	.423	.343	.740	4.0	1.1	1.0	0.6	2.2	12.3
2002	Phoenix	31	31	28.2	.415	.387	**.802**	3.7	1.2	0.9	0.7	2.0	15.3
2003	Los Angeles	33	10	12.0	.412	.269	.762	1.7	0.6	0.5	0.1	0.3	3.1
Career	7 years, 2 teams	216	93	27.3	.426	.325	.759	4.5	1.2	1.0	0.5	2.0	13.4

=== Playoffs ===
Year	Team	GP	GS	MPG	FG%	3P%	FT%	RPG	APG	SPG	BPG	TO	PPG
1997	Phoenix	1	1	31.0	.364	.333	.000	7.0	**1.0**	**2.0**	0.0	2.0	9.0
1998	Phoenix	**6**	**6**	**35.7**	.379	**.500**	**.846**	**7.8**	0.3	1.3	1.2	**2.8**	**17.0**
2000	Phoenix	2	2	32.0	**.500**	.200	.500	2.0	**1.0**	0.5	**2.5**	2.0	13.0
2003	Los Angeles	**6**	0	3.7	.000	.000	.000	0.2	0.0	0.2	0.2	0.0	0.0
Career	4 years, 2 teams	15	9	22.1	.382	.417	.750	3.9	0.3	0.8	0.9	1.5	9.1

== Head coaching record ==
Team	Year	G	W	L	W–L%	Finish	PG	PW	PL	PW–L%	Result
Minnesota	2009	34	14	20	.412	5th in Western	—	—	—	—	Missed playoffs
Los Angeles	2010	34	13	21	.382	4th in Western	2	0	2	.000	Lost in Conference semifinals
Los Angeles	2011	10	4	6	.400	(left mid-season)	—	—	—	—	—
Career		78	31	47	.397		—	—	—	—	
