= Tara Williams =

American basketball player (born 1974)

Personal information
- Born: July 23, 1974 (age 52)

Career information
- College: Auburn
- WNBA draft: 1998: Expansion draft round, 5th overall pick
- Drafted by: Detroit Shock
- Position: Guard

Career history
- 1997: Phoenix Mercury
- 1998: KR
- 2000: Portland Fire

Career highlights
- All-SEC Selection (1997, second team); SEC All-Tournament (1997)
- Stats at Basketball Reference

Tara Williams (born July 23, 1974) is a former professional basketball player who played college basketball for the Auburn Tigers women's basketball team at Auburn University from 1995 to 1997. She also played in the WNBA in 1997 for the Phoenix Mercury and in 2000 for the Portland Fire.

== Professional career ==
Although not part of the initial player allocation, elite draft or college draft, Williams was fortunately able to sign a contract with Phoenix Mercury on May 22, 1997 for the WNBA's inaugural season in 1997. Her debut game was played on June 22, 1997 in a 76 - 59 win over the Charlotte Sting where she recorded nine points and four rebounds. Williams would only play in 12 of the Mercury's 28 regular season games (mostly missing the month of July where she played in one out of 12 games). The Mercury finished 1st in the western conference with a 16–12 record and made it to the playoffs where they would be defeated by the New York Liberty 41–59 in the semi-finals. Williams had a playing time of 52 seconds, and this game would end up being Williams only playoff game in her career.

After a stint int Greece, Williams signed with KR of the Icelandic top-tier 1. deild kvenna (now known as Úrvalsdeild kvenna) in January 1998. She appeared in six regular season games, averaging 22.8 points and 10.3 rebounds, and helping KR to the second best record in the league. In the playoffs, she led KR to the finals but suffered a season ending knee injury in game four of the series. Without her, KR lost the next game and the championship series.

Williams was moved to the Detroit Shock on February 18, 1998 as part of the WNBA expansion draft. She would never play for the Shock and missed the 1998 and 1999 seasons. Looking for a comeback, Williams signed with the Sacramento Monarchs for the 2000 season. But two weeks before the Monarchs' was set to have their season opener, Williams was waived by the team on May 15, 2000.

The newly formed Portland Fire would be the next stop for Williams. After missing two back-to-back seasons, the team picked up her contract and she played her first game for the team on June 3, 2000 recording ten points, two rebounds and one steal. Williams played in many more games for the Fire than she did her rookie year with the Mercury, appearing in 26 of the Fire's 32 games. The Fire finished with a 10 - 22 record and missed the playoffs.

Williams would be waived by the Fire on April 17, 2001 (three days before the 2001 Draft) and did not play in the WNBA again.

For WNBA her career, Williams played in 38 games and averaged 3.1 points, 0.7 rebounds and 0.4 assists.

== Personal life ==
Williams' daughter, Olivia Cochran, played college basketball for the Louisville Cardinals.

== Career statistics ==
Legend
GP	Games played	GS	Games started	MPG	Minutes per game	RPG	Rebounds per game
APG	Assists per game	SPG	Steals per game	BPG	Blocks per game	PPG	Points per game
TO	Turnovers per game	FG%	Field-goal percentage	3P%	3-point field-goal percentage	FT%	Free-throw percentage
**Bold**	Career best	°	League leader

=== WNBA ===
==== Regular season ====
Year	Team	GP	GS	MPG	FG%	3P%	FT%	RPG	APG	SPG	BPG	TO	PPG
1997	Phoenix	12	0	**7.0**	.410	**.455**	–	**.7**	.3	**.3**	.0	**.3**	**3.1**
2000	Portland	**26**	0	6.7	**.449**	.341	**.500**	**.7**	**.5**	**.3**	**.1**	.4	**3.1**
Career	2 years, 2 teams	38	0	6.8	.435	.365	.500	.7	.4	.3	.1	.4	3.1

==== Playoffs ====
Year	Team	GP	GS	MPG	FG%	3P%	FT%	RPG	APG	SPG	BPG	TO	PPG
1997	Phoenix	1	0	1.0	–	–	–	.0	.0	.0	.0	.0	.0

=== College ===
Legend
GP	Games played	GS	Games started	MPG	Minutes per game
FG%	Field goal percentage	3P%	3-point field goal percentage	FT%	Free throw percentage
RPG	Rebounds per game	APG	Assists per game	SPG	Steals per game
BPG	Blocks per game	PPG	Points per game	**Bold**	Career high

Year	Team	GP	Points	FG%	3P%	FT%	RPG	APG	SPG	BPG	PPG
1995–96	Auburn	**32**	410	44.9%	0.0%	**68.8%**	**6.8**	**1.0**	1.4	1.3	12.8
1996–97	Auburn	**32**	**578**	**47.6%**	**40.0%**	67.4%	6.1	0.5	**1.6**	**1.5**	**18.1**
TOTAL	Auburn	64	988	46.4%	40.0%	68.0%	6.5	0.8	1.5	1.4	15.4
