= 1997 WNBA playoffs =

Professional women's basketball tournament

- Dates: August 28–30, 1997

Final positions
- Champions: Houston Comets (Finals Champion)
- Runners-up: New York Liberty

Tournament statistics
- Scoring leader(s): Cynthia Cooper-Dyke (Houston) (56)

Awards
- MVP: Cynthia Cooper-Dyke (Houston)

The 1997 WNBA playoffs was the postseason for the Women's National Basketball Association's 1997 season which ended with the Houston Comets beating the New York Liberty, 1-0 (65-51). Cynthia Cooper was named the MVP of the Finals. This was the first year of WNBA playoffs.

== Regular season standings ==
Eastern Conference

Eastern Conference	W	L	PCT	Conf.	GB
Houston Comets ^{x}	18	10	.643	6–6	–
New York Liberty ^{x}	17	11	.607	8–4	1.0
Charlotte Sting ^{x}	15	13	.536	5–7	3.0
Cleveland Rockers ^{o}	15	13	.536	5–7	3.0

Western Conference

Western Conference	W	L	PCT	Conf.	GB
Phoenix Mercury ^{x}	16	12	.571	9–3	–
Los Angeles Sparks ^{o}	14	14	.500	8–4	2.0
Sacramento Monarchs ^{o}	10	18	.357	4–8	6.0
Utah Starzz ^{o}	7	21	.250	3–9	9.0

Note: Teams with an "X" clinched playoff spots.

== Bracket ==
For the playoffs, the four teams with the best record in the league were seeded one to four. Houston was in the Eastern Conference so two Eastern Conference teams matched up in the WNBA Championship.

**Semifinals** single game
1	**Houston**	**70**
4	Charlotte	54
2	**New York**	**59**
3	Phoenix	41

**WNBA Championship** single game
1	**Houston**	**65**
2	New York	51

- **Bold** – Game winner
- Italic – Team with home-court advantage

== Semifinals ==
=== Charlotte Sting vs. Houston Comets ===
NBC

August 28

Recap

Charlotte Sting 54, **Houston Comets** **70**
Scoring by half: 33–29, 21–41
Pts: Congreaves, Mapp 12 each Rebs: Vicky Bullett 9 Asts: Rhonda Mapp 5	Pts: Cynthia Cooper 31; Rebs: Tina Thompson 12; Asts: Cynthia Cooper 5

The Summit, Houston, Texas
Attendance: 11,510
Referees: Sally Bell, Scott Yarbrough, Patty Broderick

=== New York Liberty vs. Phoenix Mercury ===
ESPN/Lifetime

August 28

Recap

**New York Liberty** **59**, Phoenix Mercury 41
Scoring by half: 23–18, 36–23
Pts: Rebecca Lobo 16; Rebs: Kym Hampton 14; Asts: Teresa Weatherspoon 5	Pts: Gillom, Askamp 9 each Rebs: Jennifer Gillom 7 Asts: Webb, Pettis 2 each

America West Arena, Phoenix, Arizona
Attendance: 16,751
Referees: Bob Trammel, June Courteau, Violet Palmer

== WNBA Championship ==
August 30

Recap

New York Liberty 51, **Houston Comets** **65**
Scoring by half: 24–28, 27–37
Pts: Kym Hampton 13; Rebs: Kym Hampton 13; Asts: Teresa Weatherspoon 5	Pts: Cynthia Cooper 25; Rebs: Tammy Jackson 11; Asts: Cynthia Cooper 4

The Summit, Houston, Texas
Attendance: 16,285
Referees: Violet Palmer, June Courteau, Sally Bell
