= Marlies Askamp =

German basketball player (born 1970)

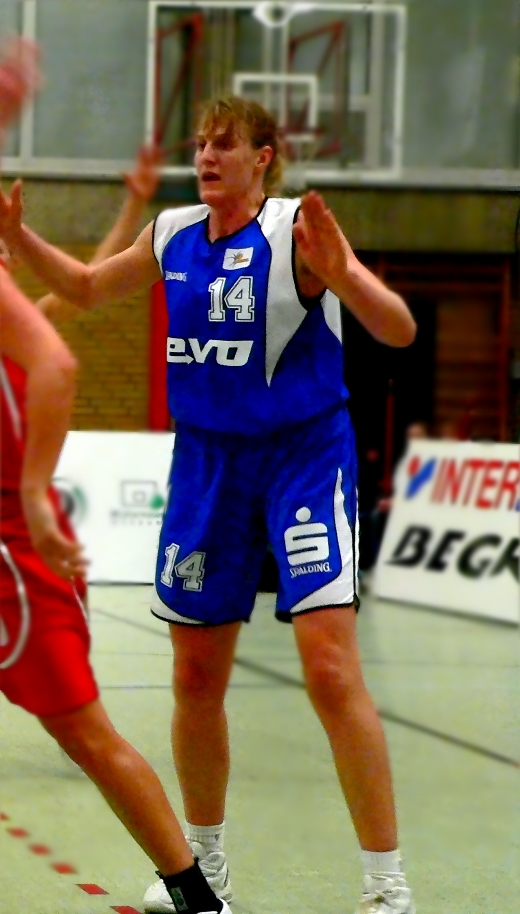

Personal information
- Born: August 7, 1970 (age 56) Dorsten, Germany
- Listed height: 6 ft 5 in (1.96 m)
- Listed weight: 198 lb (90 kg)

Career information
- Playing career: 1992–2002
- Position: Center

Career history
- 1992–1994: Wolfenbüttel
- 1994–2001: GoldZack Wuppertal
- 1997–1999: Phoenix Mercury
- 2000–2002: Miami Sol
- 2001–2002: Ros Casares
- 2002: Los Angeles Sparks
- 2002: BG Dorsten
- 2002-2003: Familia Beretta

Career highlights
- EuroLeague champion (1996); WNBA champion (2002)

Career WNBA statistics
- Points: 1,030 (6.0 ppg)
- Rebounds: 824 (4.8 rpg)
- Blocks: 71 (0.4 bpg)
- Stats at Basketball Reference

Marlies Askamp (born August 7, 1970 in Dorsten, Recklinghausen, North Rhine-Westphalia) is a German professional basketball player. She was one of the original players to play in the U.S. Women's National Basketball Association (WNBA).

== Personal ==
As a youth, Askamp played basketball and competed in track until at age 16. She speaks German, English, and French.

== Career highlights ==
- Played in the 1998 FIBA Women's Championship with the German National Team
- All-time leader in offensive rebounds (137) and total rebounds (329) for the now-defunct Miami Sol

== Career statistics ==
Legend
GP	Games played	GS	Games started	MPG	Minutes per game	RPG	Rebounds per game
APG	Assists per game	SPG	Steals per game	BPG	Blocks per game	PPG	Points per game
TO	Turnovers per game	FG%	Field-goal percentage	3P%	3-point field-goal percentage	FT%	Free-throw percentage
**Bold**	Career best	°	League leader

=== Regular season ===
Year	Team	GP	GS	MPG	FG%	3P%	FT%	RPG	APG	SPG	BPG	TO	PPG
1997	Phoenix	28	1	18.5	.393	.000	.763	5.2	0.8	**0.8**	0.3	1.6	7.5
1998	Phoenix	26	0	12.3	.471	.000	.661	3.3	0.5	0.5	0.3	0.9	5.3
1999	Phoenix	30	30	26.0	.482	.000	**.816**	**7.2**	0.8	0.7	0.6	1.2	**9.4**
2000	Miami	**32**	**32**	**27.2**	.407	**.500**	.684	**7.2**	**0.9**	0.5	**0.7**	1.5	7.8
2001	Miami	30	11	14.4	**.483**	.000	.563	2.9	0.5	0.4	0.4	0.6	2.5
2002*	Miami	6	1	12.0	.400	.000	.273	1.8	0.5	0.2	0.2	0.2	1.8
2002*^{†}	Los Angeles	20	4	10.8	.473	.000	.643	2.5	0.2	0.6	0.2	0.6	3.1
2002	Total	26	5	11.0	.462	.000	.480	2.3	0.3	0.5	0.2	**0.5**	2.8
Career	6 years, 3 teams	172	79	18.6	.440	.167	.711	4.8	0.6	0.6	0.4	1.1	6.0

=== Playoffs ===
Year	Team	GP	GS	MPG	FG%	3P%	FT%	RPG	APG	SPG	BPG	TO	PPG
1997	Phoenix	1	0	**19.0**	.333	.000	**1.000**	2.0	**1.0**	0.0	**1.0**	**0.0**	**9.0**
1998	Phoenix	**5**	0	7.2	**.400**	.000	.250	**2.4**	0.2	0.0	0.2	0.6	1.8
2002^{†}	Los Angeles	4	**3**	6.0	.000	.000	**1.000**	0.8	0.0	0.0	0.0	**0.0**	0.5
Career	3 years, 2 teams	10	3	7.9	.286	.000	.727	1.7	0.2	0.0	0.2	0.3	2.0
