= Arizona State Sun Devils women's basketball =

2026–27 Arizona State Sun Devils women's basketball team
- University: Arizona State University
- Head coach: Molly Miller (2nd season)
- Location: Tempe, Arizona
- Arena: Desert Financial Arena (capacity: 10,754)
- Conference: Big 12
- Nickname: Sun Devils
- Colors: Maroon and gold

NCAA Division I tournament Elite Eight
- 2007, 2009
Other NCAA Division I tournament results
Sweet Sixteen	1982, 1983, 2005, 2007, 2009, 2015, 2019
Appearances	1982, 1983, 1992, 2001, 2002, 2005, 2006, 2007, 2008, 2009, 2011, 2014, 2015, 2016, 2017, 2018, 2019, 2026

Conference tournament champions
- 2002

Uniforms
Home	Away

The Arizona State Sun Devils women's basketball team represents Arizona State University in women's basketball. The school competes in the Big 12 Conference in Division I of the National Collegiate Athletic Association (NCAA). The Sun Devils play at Desert Financial Arena in Tempe, Arizona near the campus.

== Season-by-season record ==
As of the end of the 2016–17 season, the Sun Devils have a 670–475 all-time record. They have reached the NCAA Tournament 18 times, with 13 of those occurring since 2000. They finished as NWIT runner up in 1981.

Season	Coach	Record	Conference Record	Postseason Finish
1975–76	Mary Littlewood	6–11	4–9 (10th)	n/a
1976–77	Linda Spradley	7–11	5–8 (t-8th)	n/a
1977–78	Linda Spradley	6–16	3–10 (6th)	n/a
1978–79	Paul Long	13–16	6–7 (t-6th)	n/a
1979–80	Juliene Simpson	12–13	3–9 (5th)	n/a
1980–81	Juliene Simpson	21–11	5–7 (5th)	NWIT Runner-up
1981–82	Juliene Simpson	25–7	8–4 (3rd)	NCAA Sweet Sixteen
1982–83	Juliene Simpson	23–7	9–5 (3rd)	NCAA Sweet Sixteen
1983–84	Juliene Simpson	17–11	6–8 (5th)	n/a
1984–85	Juliene Simpson	11–16	3–11 (6th)	n/a
1985–86	Juliene Simpson	15–10	4–4 (2nd)	n/a
1986–87	Juliene Simpson	10–17	4–14 (8th)	n/a
1987–88	Maura McHugh	11–17	5–13 (t-8th)	n/a
1988–89	Maura McHugh	9–19	3–15 (10th)	n/a
1989–90	Maura McHugh	13–15	5–13 (t-8th)	n/a
1990–91	Maura McHugh	14–14	5–13 (9th)	n/a
1991–92	Maura McHugh	20–9	11–7 (5th)	NCAA First Round
1992–93	Maura McHugh	17–10	10–8 (t-4th)	n/a
1993–94	Jacqueline Hullah	4–22	2–16 (t-9th)	n/a
1994–95	Jacqueline Hullah	8–19	2–16 (10th)	n/a
1995–96	Jacqueline Hullah	8–19	4–14 (9th)	n/a
1996–97	Charli Turner Thorne	9–19	3–15 (9th)	n/a
1997–98	Charli Turner Thorne	10–17	6–12 (t-7th)	n/a
1998–99	Charli Turner Thorne	12–15	6–12 (t-6th)	n/a
1999-00	Charli Turner Thorne	14–15	7–11 (7th)	WNIT First Round
2000–01	Charli Turner Thorne	20–11	12–6 (t-1st)	NCAA First Round
2001–02	Charli Turner Thorne	25–9	12–6 (t-2nd)	NCAA Second Round
2002–03	Charli Turner Thorne	16–14	7–11 (8th)	WNIT Second Round
2003–04	Charli Turner Thorne	17–12	11–7 (t-3rd)	WNIT First Round
2004–05	Charli Turner Thorne	24–10	12–6 (t-2nd)	NCAA Sweet 16
2005–06	Charli Turner Thorne	25–7	14–4 (2nd)	NCAA Second Round
2006–07	Charli Turner Thorne	31–5	16–2 (2nd)	NCAA Elite Eight
2007–08	Charli Turner Thorne	22–11	14–4 (3rd)	NCAA Second Round
2008–09	Charli Turner Thorne	26–9	15–3 (t-2nd)	NCAA Elite Eight
2009–10	Charli Turner Thorne	18–14	9–9 (5th)	WNIT Second Round
2010–11	Charli Turner Thorne	20–11	11–7 (3rd)	NCAA First Round
2011–12	Joseph Anders (interim)	20–12	10–8 (4th)	WNIT First Round
2012–13	Charli Turner Thorne	13–18	5–13 (9th)	n/a
2013–14	Charli Turner Thorne	23–10	11–7 (t-4th)	NCAA Second Round
2014–15	Charli Turner Thorne	29–6	15–3 (2nd)	NCAA Sweet 16
2015–16	Charli Turner Thorne	26–7	16–2 (t-1st)	NCAA Second Round
2016–17	Charli Turner Thorne	20-13	9-9 (5th)	NCAA Second Round
2017–18	Charli Turner Thorne	22–13	10–8 (6th)	NCAA Second Round
2018–19	Charli Turner Thorne	22–11	10–7 (5th)	NCAA Sweet 16
2019–20	Charli Turner Thorne	20–11	10–8 (6th)	NCAA First round
2020–21	Charli Turner Thorne	12–12	6–9 (9th)	NWIT First Round
2021–22	Charli Turner Thorne	12–14	4–9 (9th)	n/a
2022–23	Natasha Adair	8–20	1–17 (12th)	n/a
2023–24	Natasha Adair	11–20	3–15 (11th)	n/a
2024–25	Natasha Adair	10–22	3–15 (15th)	n/a
2025–26	Molly Miller	24-11	9-9 (T-9th)	NCAA First Four

== Postseason Appearances ==
=== NCAA Division I Tournament Results ===
The Sun Devils have appeared in 18 NCAA Tournaments. Their record is 21–18.

Year	Seed	Round	Opponent	Result
1982	#4	First Round; Sweet Sixteen	#5 Georgia #1 Louisiana Tech	W 97–77; L 54–92
1983	#4	First Round; Sweet Sixteen	#5 Utah #1 USC	W 78–64; L 59–96
1992	#6	First Round	#11 DePaul	L 65–67
2001	#11	First Round	#6 LSU	L 66–83
2002	#9	First Round; Second Round	#8 Wisconsin #1 Vanderbilt	W 73–70; L 35–61
2005	#5	First Round; Second Round; Sweet Sixteen	#12 Eastern Kentucky #4 Notre Dame #1 North Carolina	W 87–65; W 70–61; L 72–79
2006	#4	First Round; Second Round	#13 Stephen F. Austin #5 Utah	W 80−61; L 65–86
2007	#3	First Round; Second Round; Sweet Sixteen; Elite Eight	#14 UC Riverside #6 Louisville #7 Bowling Green #4 Rutgers	W 57–50; W 67–58; W 67–49; L 45–64
2008	#6	First Round	#11 Temple #3 Duke	W 61–54; L 59–67
2009	#6	First Round; Second Round; Sweet Sixteen; Elite Eight	#11 Georgia #3 Florida State #2 Texas A&M #1 Connecticut	W 58–47; W 63–58; W 84–69; L 64–83
2011	#7	First Round	#10 Temple	L 45–63
2014	#9	First Round; Second Round	#8 Vanderbilt #1 Notre Dame	W 69–61; L 67–84
2015	#3	First Round; Second Round; Sweet Sixteen	#14 Ohio #11 Arkansas-Little Rock #2 Florida State	W 74–55; W 57–54; L 65–66
2016	#2	First Round; Second Round	#15 New Mexico State #7 Tennessee	W 74−52; L 64–75
2017	#8	First Round; Second Round	#9 Michigan State #1 South Carolina	W 73–61; L 68–71
2018	#7	First Round; Second Round	#10 Nebraska #2 Texas	W 73–62; L 65–85
2019	#5	First Round; Second Round; Sweet Sixteen	#12 UCF #4 Miami #1 Mississippi State	W 60–45; W 57−55; L 53−76
2026	#10	First Four	#10 Virginia	L 55−57

=== WNIT Appearances ===
The Sun Devils have been in 6 WNIT Tournaments. Their record is 3–7.

Year	Round	Opponent	Result
2000	First Round	Colorado State	L 54–66
2003	First Round; Second Round	Hawaii; Baylor	W 57–44; L 62–85
2004	First Round	UNLV	L 47–50
2010	First Round; Second Round	New Mexico State; BYU	W 84–61; L 53–61
2012	First Round	Pacific	L 62–77
2021	First Round	Rice	L 48–36
2021	Consolation Bracket	Missouri	W 50–39
2021	Consolation Bracket	Houston	L 50–48

== Notable players ==
=== Honored jerseys ===
Note: the numbers are not retired, and still in use.

Arizona State Sun Devils honored jerseys
No.	Player	Years active
20	Briann January	2005–2009
21	Ryneldi Becenti	1991–1993
32	Kym Hampton	1980–1984

=== WNBA Players ===
- Briann January, Connecticut Sun

=== WNBL ===
- Joy Burke, Bendigo Spirit
