= 1998 WNBA Championship =

Basketball tournament

Team	Coach	Wins
Houston Comets	Van Chancellor	2
Phoenix Mercury	Cheryl Miller	1
- Dates: August 27-September 1
- MVP: Cynthia Cooper (Houston Comets)
- Hall of Famers: Comets: Cynthia Cooper (2010); Sheryl Swoopes (2016); Tina Thompson (2018); Mercury: Michele Timms (2024); Coaches: Van Chancellor (2007); Cheryl Miller (1995, player)
- Eastern finals: Phoenix defeated Cleveland 2-1
- Western finals: Houston defeated Charlotte 2-0

The 1998 WNBA Championship was the championship series of the 1998 WNBA season, and the conclusion of the season's playoffs. The Houston Comets, top-seeded team of the league, defeated the Phoenix Mercury, third-seeded team of the league, two games to one in a best-of-three series. This was Houston's second straight title.

The Comets made their second appearance in the Finals in two years. The Mercury appeared in the Finals for the first time in franchise history.

Going into the series, the Comets had won the only championship, being it only the second season of the league's existence.

The Comets' 27–3 record gave them home court advantage over Phoenix (19–11). The Comets lost game 1 in Phoenix, but won games 2 and 3 to take the series.

== Road to the finals ==
Houston Comets		Phoenix Mercury
27–3 (.900); 1st West, 1st overall	Regular season	19–11 (.633); 2nd West, 3rd overall
Defeated the (4) Charlotte Sting, 2–0	WNBA Semifinals	Defeated the (2) Cleveland Rockers, 2–1

=== Regular season series ===
The Houston Comets won 2 of the 3 games in the regular season series:

June 24

Recap at the Wayback Machine (archived February 10, 1999)

Houston Comets 66, Phoenix Mercury 69

America West Arena, Phoenix
Attendance: 12,622

July 21

Recap at the Wayback Machine (archived February 21, 1999)

Houston Comets 65, Phoenix Mercury 62

America West Arena, Phoenix
Attendance: 14,705

August 6

Recap at the Wayback Machine (archived February 24, 1999)

Phoenix Mercury 64, Houston Comets 75

Compaq Center, Houston
Attendance: 16,285

== Game summaries ==
All times listed below are Eastern Daylight Time.

=== Game 1 ===
ESPN

August 27
7:00pm

Recap at the Wayback Machine (archived April 18, 1999)

Houston Comets 51, Phoenix Mercury 54
Scoring by half: 29–33, 22–21
Pts: Cooper 29; Rebs: Swoopes 11; Asts: Perrot, Swoopes 6 O REB: Perrot 4 (5 tot REB)	Pts: Gillom 15; Rebs: Griffiths 12; Asts: Timms 5 Rebs: Gillom 10

America West Arena, Phoenix
Attendance: 13,634
Referees:
- Corteau
- Stokes
- Kennedy

Jennifer Gillom's basket in the lane with 8.9 seconds left gave the Phoenix Mercury a 54–51 victory over the Houston Comets in Game 1 of the WNBA Finals.

Gillom, who helped set up her go-ahead shot by blocking a shot by Houston's Kim Perrot on the previous possession, finished with 15 points on just 5-of-20 shooting. She also grabbed 10 rebounds.

The Mercury, who finished eight games behind the Comets in the Western Conference, could now win the title with a victory at Houston on Game Two. Phoenix handed Houston its fourth loss all season (another also being against Phoenix in the regular season).

League MVP Cynthia Cooper was a one-woman show for the Comets, finishing with 29 points. The rest of the team—which includes first-team All-WNBA choices Sheryl Swoopes and Tina Thompson—managed to hit just 10-of-41 shots.

=== Game 2 ===
NBC

August 29
7:00 pm

Recap at the Wayback Machine (archived February 2, 1999)

Phoenix Mercury 69, Houston Comets 74 (OT)
Scoring by half: 37–32, 29–34 Overtime: 3–8
Pts: Timms 21; Rebs: Gillom 9 Asts: Griffiths 3 Blocks: Gillom 3	Pts: Cooper 27; Rebs: Swoopes 13; Asts: Cooper 6 FG: Lamb 6-10

Compaq Center, Houston
Attendance: 16,285
Referees:
- Bell
- Price
- Zielinski

Cynthia Cooper scored 19 of her 27 points after halftime as the defending champion Houston Comets forced a decisive third game in the WNBA Finals with a 74-69 overtime victory over the Phoenix Mercury. Sheryl Swoopes added 14 points and 13 rebounds for the Comets, who host Game 3. Houston, which won 27 of 30 regular-season games, lost Game 1 at Phoenix and trailed 62-50 with 7:24 to play before staging a furious rally to save its season.

Michele Timms scored 21 points before fouling out in the final minute and reserve Kristi Harrower added a career-high 12 for Phoenix, which seemingly had taken control of the game with a 12–2 run midway through the second half. Jennifer Gillom, who averaged a team-high 20.8 points per game for the Mercury, scored just eight on 3-of-15 shooting.

Phoenix, which led almost the entire second half, held a 50–48 edge with 11:43 to go after Cooper sank a foul shot following a technical foul on Mercury coach Cheryl Miller, which seemed to light a spark under the Mercury.

Houston sensed the urgency and clawed back into the game. Yolanda Moore had a basket off an offensive rebound before Cooper added a free throw and eight-foot bank shot to make it 62–55 with 5:02 left.

Houston shot 43 percent (28-of-65) from the field and Thompson finished with 12 points and 12 rebounds. Cooper was 11-of-14 from the line. The Mercury shot just 38 percent (24-of-63) but did hit 7-of-15 three-point shots.

=== Game 3 ===
ESPN

September 1
7:00 pm

Recap at the Wayback Machine (archived February 2, 1999)

Phoenix Mercury 71, Houston Comets 80
Scoring by half: 26–32, 45–48
Pts: Griffiths 24; Rebs: Gillom 6 Asts: Timms 7 FG: Griffiths 10-16	Pts: Cooper 23; Rebs: Thompson 6 Asts: Cooper, Swoopes 6 FG: Thompson 7-12

Compaq Center, Houston
Attendance: 16,285
Referees:
- Corteau
- Kennedy
- Zielinski

The Houston Comets claimed their second straight WNBA championship, pulling away from the pesky Phoenix Mercury late in the second half and claiming an 80–71 victory in decisive Game 3.

After cruising through the regular season with a 27–3 record, the Comets were pushed to the limit by the Mercury after finishing eight games ahead of them in the Western Conference. In the end, however, Houston's trio of stars ensured the repeat.

League MVP Cynthia Cooper scored 23 points and Tina Thompson added 18. Sheryl Swoopes, nearly invisible for the first 30 minutes, had 11 points in the final 9:13 and finished with 16.

Michelle Griffiths scored a career-high 24 points and Jennifer Gillom had her best game of the series, netting 20. But Phoenix got nothing from Michele Timms, who finished with only two points—19 fewer than she had in Game 2.

The Comets had now won what was until then the only two WNBA championship series.

== Awards ==
- 1998 WNBA champion: Houston Comets
- Finals MVP: Cynthia Cooper

== Rosters ==
1998 Houston Comets Finals roster
Players
Coaches

Pos.	No.	Nat.	Name	Height	Weight	From
F	4	(Brazil)	Arcain, Janeth	5' 11" (1.8m)	147 lb (67kg)	Brazil
G	14	(United States)	Cooper, Cynthia	5' 10" (1.78m)	150 lb (68kg)	USC
F	23	(United States)	Jackson, Tammy	6' 2" (1.88m)	190 lb (86kg)	Florida
C	40	(United States)	Lamb, Monica	6' 5" (1.96m)	206 lb (93kg)	USC
F	33	(United States)	Moore, Yolanda	6' 0" (1.83m)	175 lb (79kg)	Mississippi
G	10	(United States)	Perrot, Kim	5' 5" (1.65m)	130 lb (59kg)	Louisiana
C	00	(United States)	Roberts, Nyree	6' 2" (1.88m)	209 lb (95kg)	Old Dominion
F	22	(United States)	Swoopes, Sheryl	6' 0" (1.83m)	145 lb (66kg)	Texas Tech
F	7	(United States)	Thompson, Tina	6' 2" (1.88m)	178 lb (81kg)	USC
F	13	(Spain)	Valdemoro, Amaya	6' 1" (1.85m)	160 lb (73kg)	Spain
G	5	(United States)	Woosley, Tiffany	5' 7" (1.7m)	132 lb (60kg)	Tennessee

Head coach
(United States) Van Chancellor (Mississippi State)

Legend

- (C) Team captain
- (DP) Unsigned draft pick
- (FA) Free agent
- (S) Suspended
- Injured

1998 Phoenix Mercury Finals roster
Players
Coaches

Pos.	No.	Nat.	Name	Height	Weight	From
C	14	(Germany)	Askamp, Marlies	6' 5" (1.96m)	198 lb (90kg)	Germany
F	0	(United States)	Foster, Toni	6' 1" (1.85m)	175 lb (79kg)	Iowa
F	22	(United States)	Gillom, Jennifer	6' 3" (1.91m)	180 lb (82kg)	Mississippi
F	12	(Australia)	Griffiths, Michelle	6' 1" (1.85m)	177 lb (80kg)	Australia
G	4	(Australia)	Harrower, Kristi	5' 4" (1.63m)	139 lb (63kg)	Australia
G	15	(Slovakia)	Kuklova, Andrea	6' 0" (1.83m)	150 lb (68kg)	Slovakia
G	32	(United States)	Pettis, Bridget	5' 9" (1.75m)	150 lb (68kg)	Florida
F	13	(United States)	Reed, Brandy	6' 1" (1.85m)	168 lb (76kg)	Southern Miss
C	8	(Russia)	Stepanova, Maria	6' 8" (2.03m)	187 lb (85kg)	Russia
G	7	(Australia)	Timms, Michele	5' 7" (1.7m)	132 lb (60kg)	Australia
G	21	(United States)	Webb, Umeki	5' 10" (1.78m)	162 lb (73kg)	NC State

Head coach
(United States) Cheryl Miller (USC)

Legend

- (C) Team captain
- (DP) Unsigned draft pick
- (FA) Free agent
- (S) Suspended
- Injured
