= 1999 Houston Comets season =

- WNBA champions
- Head coach: Van Chancellor
- Arena: Compaq Center

Results
- Record: 26–6 (.813)
- Place: 1st (Western)
- Playoff finish: Won WNBA Finals

The 1999 WNBA season was the third season for the Houston Comets. The Comets won their third consecutive WNBA Championship.

== Transactions ==
=== Orlando Miracle expansion draft ===
The following player was selected in the Orlando Miracle expansion draft from the Houston Comets:

Player	Nationality	School/Team/Country
Yolanda Moore	United States	Ole Miss

=== WNBA draft ===
Round	Pick	Player	Nationality	School/Team/Country
1	12	Natalia Zasulskaya	Soviet Union	Dynamo Moscow (Russia)
2	24	Sonja Henning	United States	Portland Power
3	36	Kara Wolters	United States	New England Blizzard
4	48	Jennifer Rizzotti	United States	New England Blizzard

=== Transactions ===
Date	Transaction
April 6, 1999	Lost Yolanda Moore to the Orlando Miracle in the WNBA expansion draft
May 4, 1999	Drafted Natalia Zasulskaya, Sonja Henning, Kara Wolters and Jennifer Rizzotti in the 1999 WNBA draft
July 11, 1999	Traded Nyree Roberts to the Washington Mystics in exchange for Alessandra Santos de Oliveira

== Roster ==
1999 Houston Comets roster
Players
Coaches

Pos.	No.	Nat.	Name	Height	Weight	DOB	From	Yrs
G	9	(Brazil)	Arcain, Janeth	5' 11" (1.8m)	147 lb (67kg)	1969-04-11		2
G	14	(United States)	Cooper, Cynthia	5' 10" (1.78m)	150 lb (68kg)	1963-04-14	USC	2
G		(United States)	Henning, Sonja	5' 7" (1.7m)	143 lb (65kg)	1969-10-04	Stanford	R
F/C	23	(United States)	Jackson, Tammy	6' 2" (1.88m)	190 lb (86kg)	1962-12-03	Florida	2
C	40	(United States)	Lamb, Monica	6' 5" (1.96m)	206 lb (93kg)	1964-10-11	USC	1
F	24	(Socialist Federal Republic of Yugoslavia)	Nikolich, Mila	6' 3" (1.91m)	185 lb (84kg)	1971-04-07	Abilene Christian	R
G	21	(United States)	Rizzotti, Jennifer	5' 6" (1.68m)	146 lb (66kg)	1974-05-15	Connecticut	R
C	0	(United States)	Roberts, Nyree	6' 3" (1.91m)	209 lb (95kg)	1976-03-10	Old Dominion	1
G/F	22	(United States)	Swoopes, Sheryl	6' 0" (1.83m)	145 lb (66kg)	1971-03-25	Texas Tech	2
F	7	(United States)	Thompson, Tina	6' 2" (1.88m)	178 lb (81kg)	1975-02-10	USC	2
C	15	(People's Republic of Bulgaria)	Tzekova, Polina	6' 4" (1.93m)	189 lb (86kg)	1968-04-30		R
F	13	(Francoist Spain)	Valdemoro, Amaya	6' 1" (1.85m)		1976-08-18		1
C	52	(United States)	Wolters, Kara	6' 7" (2.01m)	227 lb (103kg)	1975-08-15	Connecticut	R

Head coach
(United States) Van Chancellor (Mississippi State)

Legend

- (C) Team captain
- (DP) Unsigned draft pick
- (FA) Free agent
- (S) Suspended
- Injured

== Schedule ==
=== Regular season ===
1999 game log
Total: 26–6 (Home: 15–1; Road: 11–5)
June: 8–1 (Home: 3–1; Road: 5–0)

Game	Date	Team	Score	High points	High rebounds	High assists	Location Attendance	Record
1	June 10	@ Orlando	W 77–63	Cynthia Cooper (24)	Tina Thompson (12)	Cynthia Cooper (7)	TD Waterhouse Centre	1–0
2	June 12	Washington	W 88–63	Cynthia Cooper (24)	Tina Thompson (7)	Sheryl Swoopes (6)	Compaq Center	2–0
3	June 17	Cleveland	W 93–73	Cynthia Cooper (30)	Polina Tzekova (9)	Cynthia Cooper (6)	Compaq Center	3–0
4	June 19	@ Minnesota	W 69–55	Cynthia Cooper (22)	Sheryl Swoopes (10)	Cynthia Cooper (5)	Target Center	4–0
5	June 22	Los Angeles	W 84–76	Cynthia Cooper (36)	Polina Tzekova (7)	Cynthia Cooper (4)	Compaq Center	5–0
6	June 24	@ Detroit	W 77–65	Cynthia Cooper (24)	Tina Thompson (6)	Cooper; Swoopes (3)	The Palace of Auburn Hills	6–0
7	June 25	@ Washington	W 72–69	Cynthia Cooper (28)	Sheryl Swoopes (12)	Cynthia Cooper (8)	Compaq Center	7–0
8	June 28	Orlando	L 66–68	Cynthia Cooper (21)	Tina Thompson (9)	Sheryl Swoopes (8)	Compaq Center	7–1
9	June 30	@ Utah	W 78–68	Sheryl Swoopes (29)	Tammy Jackson (10)	Sonja Henning (6)	Delta Center	8–1

July : 11–3 (Home: 6–0; Road: 5–3)

Game	Date	Team	Score	High points	High rebounds	High assists	Location Attendance	Record
10	July 1	Cleveland	W 76–64	Tina Thompson (26)	Tina Thompson (9)	Cynthia Cooper (6)	Compaq Center	9–1
11	July 3	New York	W 78–64	Sheryl Swoopes (19)	Sheryl Swoopes (7)	Cynthia Cooper (7)	Compaq Center	10–1
12	July 6	Minnesota	W 80–54	Cynthia Cooper (21)	Tina Thompson (9)	Cynthia Cooper (9)	Compaq Center	11–1
13	July 8	@ Sacramento	L 63–74	Tina Thompson (17)	Arcain; Jackson; Thompson (5)	Sonja Henning (5)	ARCO Arena	11–2
14	July 9	@ Phoenix	W 71–70	Sheryl Swoopes (18)	Thompson; Tzekova (5)	Polina Tzekova (3)	America West Arena	12–2
15	July 11	Sacramento	W 68–63	Cynthia Cooper (31)	Sheryl Swoopes (10)	Cynthia Cooper (6)	Compaq Center	13–2
16	July 16	@ Utah	W 88–84 (OT)	Sheryl Swoopes (33)	Sheryl Swoopes (7)	Sheryl Swoopes (7)	Delta Center	14–2
17	July 18	@ Los Angeles	L 65–78	Sheryl Swoopes (21)	Polina Tzekova (7)	Cynthia Cooper (5)	Great Western Forum	14–3
18	July 19	@ Phoenix	L 48–60	Cynthia Cooper (19)	Tina Thompson (11)	Sheryl Swoopes (5)	America West Arena	14–4
19	July 23	@ Charlotte	W 75–62	Cynthia Cooper (26)	Tina Thompson (8)	Cynthia Cooper (5)	Charlotte Coliseum	15–4
20	July 25	@ Minnesota	W 62–57	Cynthia Cooper (20)	Tina Thompson (10)	Cooper; Swoopes (6)	Target Center	16–4
21	July 27	Detroit	W 85–46	Cynthia Cooper (20)	Sheryl Swoopes (15)	Sheryl Swoopes (10)	Compaq Center	17–4
22	July 29	@ Cleveland	W 71–65	Sheryl Swoopes (28)	Swoopes; Thompson (6)	Cynthia Cooper (7)	Gund Arena	18–4
23	July 31	Phoenix	W 77–70	Sheryl Swoopes (23)	Swoopes; Tzekova (7)	Cynthia Cooper (6)	Compaq Center	19–4

August : 7–2 (Home: 6–0; Road: 1–2)

Game	Date	Team	Score	High points	High rebounds	High assists	Location Attendance	Record
24	August 2	Sacramento	W 75–70	Sheryl Swoopes (26)	Sheryl Swoopes (6)	Cooper; Swoopes (6)	Compaq Center	20–4
25	August 6	Charlotte	W 81–51	Cynthia Cooper (25)	Tammy Jackson (10)	Sheryl Swoopes (7)	Compaq Center	21–4
26	August 8	@ New York	L 71–74	Cynthia Cooper (26)	Sheryl Swoopes (7)	Cooper; Swoopes (5)	Madison Square Garden	21–5
27	August 12	Los Angeles	W 83–61	Sheryl Swoopes (20)	Sheryl Swoopes (8)	Cooper; Swoopes (5)	Compaq Center	22–5
28	August 14	Minnesota	W 71–53	Cynthia Cooper (17)	Polina Tzekova (7)	Cynthia Cooper (4)	Compaq Center	23–5
29	August 16	Utah	W 80–71	Cynthia Cooper (42)	Polina Tzekova (11)	Sheryl Swoopes (5)	Compaq Center	24–5
30	August 18	Phoenix	W 70–60	Sheryl Swoopes (24)	Polina Tzekova (9)	Cynthia Cooper (7)	Compaq Center	25–5
31	August 20	@ Los Angeles	L 64–68	Sheryl Swoopes (25)	Sheryl Swoopes (8)	Sonja Henning (5)	Great Western Forum	25–6
32	August 21	@ Sacramento	W 74–65	Cynthia Cooper (27)	Janeth Arcain (8)	Cynthia Cooper (10)	ARCO Arena	26–6

1999 season schedule

=== Playoffs ===
Led by what was already known as the Big Three, (Sheryl Swoopes, Cynthia Cooper and Tina Thompson), the Comets survived a highlight film last second, court to court game winning shot by the Liberty's Teresa Weatherspoon in Game 2 of the finals to beat the Liberty in three games and win their third straight title, this one after the death of teammate Kim Perrot, who died of cancer.

1999 playoff game log
Conference Finals vs. Los Angeles Sparks
Won Series: 2–1

Game	Date	Team	Score	High points	High rebounds	High assists	Location Attendance	Series
1	August 26	@ Los Angeles	L 60–75	Sheryl Swoopes (17)	Tina Thompson (7)	Cynthia Cooper (7)	Great Western Forum	0–1
2	August 29	Los Angeles	W 83–55	Cynthia Cooper (22)	Tammy Jackson (10)	Cynthia Cooper (9)	Compaq Center	1–1
3	August 30	Los Angeles	W 72–62	Cooper; Swoopes (23)	Cynthia Cooper (7)	Cynthia Cooper (12)	Compaq Center	2–1

Championship vs. New York Liberty
Won Series: 2–1

Game	Date	Team	Score	High points	High rebounds	High assists	Location Attendance	Series
1	September 2	@ New York	W 73–60	Cynthia Cooper (29)	Tammy Jackson (8)	Cynthia Cooper (6)	Madison Square Garden	1–0
2	September 4	New York	L 67–68	Tina Thompson (15)	Tzekova; Swoopes (6)	Cynthia Cooper (6)	Compaq Center	1–1
3	September 5	New York	W 59–47	Cynthia Cooper (24)	Tammy Jackson (11)	Sonja Henning (2)	Compaq Center	2–1

1999 playoff schedule

=== Season standings ===
Western Conference	W	L	PCT	Conf.	GB
Houston Comets ^{x}	26	6	.813	16–4	–
Los Angeles Sparks ^{x}	20	12	.625	12–8	6.0
Sacramento Monarchs ^{x}	19	13	.594	9–11	7.0
Phoenix Mercury ^{o}	15	17	.469	7–13	11.0
Minnesota Lynx ^{o}	15	17	.469	8–12	11.0
Utah Starzz ^{o}	15	17	.469	8–12	11.0

== Statistics ==
Legend
GP	Games played	GS	Games started	MPG	Minutes per game	RPG	Rebounds per game
APG	Assists per game	SPG	Steals per game	BPG	Blocks per game	PPG	Points per game
FG%	Field-goal percentage	3P%	3-point field-goal percentage	FT%	Free-throw percentage	TO	Turnovers per game
PF	Fouls per game		Team leader		League leader

=== Regular season ===
Player	GP	GS	MPG	FG%	3P%	FT%	RPG	APG	SPG	BPG	PPG
Cynthia Cooper	31	31	35.5	.463	.335	.891	2.8	5.2	1.4	0.4	22.1
Sheryl Swoopes	32	32	34.4	.462	.337	.820	6.3	4.0	2.4	1.4	18.3
Tina Thompson	32	32	33.6	.419	.351	.782	6.4	0.9	1.0	1.0	12.2
Sonja Henning	32	32	24.9	.444	.317	.611	2.5	2.3	1.1	0.2	4.0
Polina Tzekova	32	32	24.3	.429	.250	.775	5.1	1.0	0.4	0.6	6.1
Janeth Arcain	32	1	23.0	.433	.250	.829	2.8	1.2	0.9	0.1	5.8
Tammy Jackson	28	0	13.6	.414	1.000	.714	3.3	0.3	0.5	0.7	2.6
Monica Lamb	3	0	12.0	.400	N/A	.833	2.0	0.0	0.0	0.7	4.3
Jennifer Rizzotti	25	0	9.7	.350	.269	.583	1.1	0.8	0.7	0.0	1.7
Amaya Valdemoro	17	0	5.4	.371	.400	.750	0.8	0.5	0.6	0.0	2.4
Nyree Roberts	4	0	4.3	.000	N/A	.500	0.5	0.0	0.0	0.0	0.3
Mila Nikolich	7	0	4.1	.364	.250	.500	0.7	0.1	0.0	0.0	1.4
Kara Wolters	10	0	4.1	.231	N/A	.833	1.2	0.2	0.1	0.0	1.6

^{‡}Waived/Released during the season
^{†}Traded during the season
^{≠}Acquired during the season

== Awards and honors ==
- Cynthia Cooper, WNBA Finals MVP Award
- Cynthia Cooper, Best WNBA Player ESPY Award
- Cynthia Cooper, Guard, Houston Comets, All-WNBA First Team
- Van Chancellor, WNBA Coach of the Year Award
- Sheryl Swoopes, Forward, Houston Comets, All-WNBA First Team
- Tina Thompson, Forward, Houston Comets, All-WNBA Second Team
