= 1998 Houston Comets season =

- WNBA champions
- Head coach: Van Chancellor
- Arena: Compaq Center

Results
- Record: 27–3 (.900)
- Place: 1st (Western)
- Playoff finish: Won WNBA Finals

The 1998 WNBA season was the second season for the Houston Comets. The Comets won their second straight championship. Their record of 27-3 remains the best in league history.

== Transactions ==
=== Washington Mystics expansion draft ===
The following player was selected in the Washington Mystics expansion draft from the Houston Comets:

Player	Nationality	School/Team/Country
Tammy Jackson	United States	Florida

=== WNBA draft ===
Round	Pick	Player	Nationality	School/Team/Country
1	10	Polina Tzekova	Bulgaria	Tarbes Gespe Bigorre (France)
2	20	Nyree Roberts	United States	Old Dominion
3	30	Amaya Valdemoro	Spain	Pool Getafe (Spain)
4	40	Monica Lamb	United States	USC

=== Transactions ===
Date	Transaction
February 18, 1998	Lost Tammy Jackson to the Washington Mystics in the WNBA expansion draft
April 29, 1998	Drafted Polina Tzekova, Nyree Roberts, Amaya Valdemoro and Monica Lamb in the 1998 WNBA draft
May 8, 1998	Traded Fran Harris to the Utah Starzz in exchange for Karen Booker

== Roster ==
1998 Houston Comets roster
Players
Coaches

Pos.	No.	Nat.	Name	Height	Weight	DOB	From	Yrs
G	9	(Brazil)	Arcain, Janeth	5' 11" (1.8m)	147 lb (67kg)	1969-04-11		1
C		(United States)	Booker, Karen	6' 1" (1.85m)	170 lb (77kg)	1965-04-10	Vanderbilt	1
G	14	(United States)	Cooper, Cynthia	5' 10" (1.78m)	150 lb (68kg)	1963-04-14	USC	1
C	4	(United States)	Guyton, Wanda	6' 1" (1.85m)	178 lb (81kg)	1968-10-14	South Florida	1
F/C	23	(United States)	Jackson, Tammy	6' 2" (1.88m)	190 lb (86kg)	1962-12-03	Florida	1
C	40	(United States)	Lamb, Monica	6' 5" (1.96m)	206 lb (93kg)	1964-10-11	USC	R
F/C	33	(United States)	Moore, Yolanda	6' 0" (1.83m)	175 lb (79kg)	1974-07-01	Mississippi	1
G	10	(United States)	Perrot, Kim	5' 5" (1.65m)	130 lb (59kg)	1967-01-18	Louisiana	1
C	0	(United States)	Roberts, Nyree	6' 3" (1.91m)	209 lb (95kg)	1976-03-10	Old Dominion	R
G/F	22	(United States)	Swoopes, Sheryl	6' 0" (1.83m)	145 lb (66kg)	1971-03-25	Texas Tech	1
F	7	(United States)	Thompson, Tina	6' 2" (1.88m)	178 lb (81kg)	1975-02-10	USC	1
F	13	(Francoist Spain)	Valdemoro, Amaya	6' 1" (1.85m)		1976-08-18		R
G	5	(United States)	Woosley, Tiffany	5' 7" (1.7m)	132 lb (60kg)	1973-04-26	Tennessee	1

Head coach
(United States) Van Chancellor (Mississippi State)

Legend

- (C) Team captain
- (DP) Unsigned draft pick
- (FA) Free agent
- (S) Suspended
- Injured

== Schedule ==
=== Regular season ===
1998 game log
Total: 27–3 (Home: 14–1; Road: 13–2)
June: 8–1 (Home: 4–0; Road: 4–1)

Game	Date	Team	Score	High points	High rebounds	High assists	Location Attendance	Record
1	June 13	New York	W 73–62	Sheryl Swoopes (28)	Tina Thompson (8)	Kim Perrot (7)	Compaq Center	1–0
2	June 15	@ Charlotte	W 79–65	Cynthia Cooper (31)	Tina Thompson (8)	Kim Perrot (6)	Charlotte Coliseum	2–0
3	June 18	Cleveland	W 87–69	Sheryl Swoopes (25)	Tina Thompson (6)	Cynthia Cooper (7)	Compaq Center	3–0
4	June 20	@ Sacramento	W 79–68	Cynthia Cooper (22)	Tina Thompson (9)	Cynthia Cooper (6)	ARCO Arena	4–0
5	June 21	@ Los Angeles	W 79–63	Cynthia Cooper (29)	Monica Lamb (11)	Cynthia Cooper (5)	Great Western Forum	5–0
6	June 24	@ Phoenix	L 66–69	Cynthia Cooper (27)	Tina Thompson (13)	Cynthia Cooper (3)	America West Arena	5–1
7	June 27	Los Angeles	W 75–64	Cynthia Cooper (28)	Cynthia Cooper (6)	Kim Perrot (6)	Compaq Center	6–1
8	June 29	Washington	W 73–48	Cynthia Cooper (16)	Lamb; Thompson (6)	Kim Perrot (3)	Compaq Center	7–1
9	June 30	@ Utah	W 75–73 (2OT)	Cynthia Cooper (27)	Tina Thompson (14)	Cynthia Cooper (5)	Delta Center	8–1

July : 12–0 (Home: 6–0; Road: 6–0)

Game	Date	Team	Score	High points	High rebounds	High assists	Location Attendance	Record
10	July 3	Sacramento	W 84–67	Cynthia Cooper (34)	Tina Thompson (10)	Cynthia Cooper (5)	Compaq Center	9–1
11	July 6	@ Cleveland	W 78–64	Cooper; Swoopes (18)	Yolanda Moore (7)	Sheryl Swoopes (7)	Gund Arena	10–1
12	July 8	@ New York	W 79–54	Cynthia Cooper (23)	Lamb; Swoopes (7)	Kim Perrot (8)	Madison Square Garden	11–1
13	July 9	Detroit	W 96–66	Kim Perrot (22)	Arcain; Perrot (6)	Cooper; Perrot (7)	Compaq Center	12–1
14	July 11	Utah	W 72–68	Cynthia Cooper (24)	Monica Lamb (6)	Kim Perrot (7)	Compaq Center	13–1
15	July 13	Washington	W 81–67	Cynthia Cooper (23)	Sheryl Swoopes (7)	Cynthia Cooper (8)	Compaq Center	14–1
16	July 17	@ Los Angeles	W 74–68	Cynthia Cooper (22)	Sheryl Swoopes (10)	Kim Perrot (9)	Great Western Forum	15–1
17	July 18	@ Sacramento	W 75–44	Cynthia Cooper (23)	Tina Thompson (11)	Kim Perrot (7)	ARCO Arena	16–1
18	July 21	@ Phoenix	W 65–62	Cynthia Cooper (23)	Sheryl Swoopes (10)	Cynthia Cooper (3)	America West Arena	17–1
19	July 25	@ Charlotte	W 67–58	Sheryl Swoopes (20)	Cynthia Cooper (8)	Cynthia Cooper (8)	Charlotte Coliseum	18–1
20	July 28	Phoenix	W 72–62	Cynthia Cooper (27)	Tina Thompson (9)	Cooper; Thompson (3)	Compaq Center	19–1
21	July 30	Utah	W 88–65	Cynthia Cooper (22)	Sheryl Swoopes (8)	Cynthia Cooper (10)	Compaq Center	20–1

August : 7–2 (Home: 4–1; Road: 3–1)

Game	Date	Team	Score	High points	High rebounds	High assists	Location Attendance	Record
22	August 1	Cleveland	L 71–74 (OT)	Sheryl Swoopes (18)	Monica Lamb (8)	Cynthia Cooper (8)	Compaq Center	20–2
23	August 2	Sacramento	W 70–53	Sheryl Swoopes (20)	Monica Lamb (8)	Cooper; Swoopes (3)	Compaq Center	21–2
24	August 4	@ Utah	W 77–57	Cynthia Cooper (32)	Janeth Arcain (9)	Kim Perrot (7)	Delta Center	22–2
25	August 6	Phoenix	W 75–64	Cynthia Cooper (21)	Tina Thompson (10)	Kim Perrot (7)	Compaq Center	23–2
26	August 7	@ Detroit	W 61–57	Cynthia Cooper (34)	Yolanda Moore (7)	Cooper; Swoopes; Perrot (2)	The Palace of Auburn Hills	24–2
27	August 10	Charlotte	W 70–67	Cooper; Swoopes (20)	Tina Thompson (13)	Kim Perrot (9)	Compaq Center	25–2
28	August 15	@ New York	L 54–70	Cynthia Cooper (17)	Perrot; Thompson (5)	Cynthia Cooper (3)	Madison Square Garden	25–3
29	August 17	@ Washington	W 110–65	Cynthia Cooper (21)	Monica Lamb (9)	Kim Perrot (7)	MCI Center	26–3
30	August 19	Los Angeles	W 80–71	Cynthia Cooper (22)	Sheryl Swoopes (10)	Cooper; Perrot (7)	Compaq Center	27–3

1998 season schedule

=== Playoffs ===
1998 playoff game log
Semifinal vs. Charlotte Sting
Won Series: 2–0

Game	Date	Team	Score	High points	High rebounds	High assists	Location Attendance	Series
1	August 22	@ Charlotte	W 85–71	Cynthia Cooper (27)	Tina Thompson (10)	Kim Perrot (6)	Charlotte Coliseum	1–0
2	August 24	Charlotte	W 77–61	Cynthia Cooper (23)	Tina Thompson (14)	Cooper; Perrot (5)	Compaq Center	2–0

Championship vs. Phoenix Mercury
Won Series: 2–1

Game	Date	Team	Score	High points	High rebounds	High assists	Location Attendance	Series
1	August 27	@ Phoenix	L 51–54	Cynthia Cooper (29)	Sheryl Swoopes (11)	Swoopes; Perrot (6)	America West Arena	0–1
2	August 29	Phoenix	W 74–69 (OT)	Cynthia Cooper (27)	Sheryl Swoopes (13)	Cynthia Cooper (6)	Compaq Center	1–1
3	September 1	Phoenix	W 80–71	Cynthia Cooper (23)	Tina Thompson (6)	Cynthia Cooper; Swoopes (6)	Compaq Center	2–1

1998 playoff schedule

=== Season standings ===
Western Conference	W	L	PCT	Conf.	GB
Houston Comets ^{x}	27	3	.900	15–1	–
Phoenix Mercury ^{x}	19	11	.633	10–6	8.0
Los Angeles Sparks ^{o}	12	18	.400	6–10	15.0
Sacramento Monarchs ^{o}	8	22	.267	5–11	19.0
Utah Starzz ^{o}	8	22	.267	4–12	19.0

== Statistics ==
Legend
GP	Games played	GS	Games started	MPG	Minutes per game	RPG	Rebounds per game
APG	Assists per game	SPG	Steals per game	BPG	Blocks per game	PPG	Points per game
FG%	Field-goal percentage	3P%	3-point field-goal percentage	FT%	Free-throw percentage	TO	Turnovers per game
PF	Fouls per game		Team leader		League leader

=== Regular season ===
Player	GP	GS	MPG	FG%	3P%	FT%	RPG	APG	SPG	BPG	PPG
Cynthia Cooper	30	30	35.0	.446	.400	.854	3.7	4.4	1.6	0.4	22.7
Kim Perrot	30	30	32.9	.404	.269	.700	3.1	4.7	2.8	0.0	8.5
Tina Thompson	27	27	32.4	.419	.359	.851	7.1	0.9	1.1	0.9	12.7
Sheryl Swoopes	29	29	32.3	.427	.360	.826	5.1	2.1	2.5	0.5	15.6
Janeth Arcain	30	4	21.9	.426	.152	.756	3.6	0.9	0.8	0.1	6.8
Monica Lamb	30	25	21.6	.541	N/A	.690	4.7	0.3	0.8	0.7	5.4
Yolanda Moore	30	4	17.8	.451	.500	.805	2.9	0.3	0.9	0.0	3.3
Wanda Guyton	1	1	14.0	.000	N/A	N/A	0.0	0.0	1.0	1.0	0.0
Tammy Jackson	19	0	8.4	.381	N/A	.727	1.1	0.3	0.2	0.3	1.3
Tiffany Woosley	18	0	5.3	.304	.250	.714	0.4	0.5	0.4	0.0	1.2
Nyree Roberts	14	0	3.9	.857	N/A	.571	0.7	0.1	0.1	0.0	1.1
Amaya Valdemoro	16	0	3.8	.500	.400	.706	0.6	0.4	0.4	0.1	1.9
Karen Booker	1	0	2.0	.000	N/A	N/A	0.0	0.0	0.1	0.0	0.0

^{‡}Waived/Released during the season
^{†}Traded during the season
^{≠}Acquired during the season

== Awards and honors ==
- Cynthia Cooper, WNBA Finals MVP Award
- Cynthia Cooper, WNBA Most Valuable Player Award
- Cynthia Cooper, Best WNBA Player ESPY Award
- Van Chancellor, WNBA Coach of the Year Award
