= Van Chancellor =

American basketball player and coach

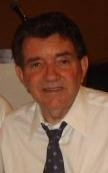
- Chancellor at the 2005 Women's Final Four in Indianapolis

Biographical details
- Born: September 27, 1943 (age 83); Louisville, Mississippi, U.S.

Coaching career (HC unless noted)
- 1965–1967: Noxapater HS
- 1967–1973: Horn Lake HS
- 1973–1978: Harrison Central HS
- 1978–1997: Ole Miss
- 1997–2006: Houston Comets
- 2002–2004: United States
- 2007–2011: LSU

Head coaching record
- Overall: 530–195 (NCAA); 211–111 (WNBA)

Accomplishments and honors

Championships
- 4× WNBA champion (1997–2000); NCAA Regional—Final Four (2008)
- Basketball Hall of Fame; Inducted in 2007 (profile)
- Women's Basketball Hall of Fame
Medal record
Coach for Women's Basketball
United States (head coach)
Olympic Games
Gold medal – first place	2004 Athens	Team
FIBA World Championship for Women
Gold medal – first place	2002 China	Team

Van Winston Chancellor (born September 27, 1943) is an American former college and professional basketball coach. He coached University of Mississippi women's basketball, Louisiana State University women's basketball, and the professional Houston Comets. He was named head coach of the Lady Tigers on April 11, 2007, replacing Pokey Chatman. In 2001, Chancellor was elected to the Women's Basketball Hall of Fame, located in Knoxville, Tennessee. He was enshrined as a member of the Naismith Memorial Basketball Hall of Fame in September 2007. Chancellor is an analyst for Southland Conference games on ESPN3.

== Early years ==
Chancellor played two years of basketball at East Central Junior College in Decatur, Mississippi, before transferring to Mississippi State University, where he earned a bachelor's degree in mathematics & physical education in 1965.

During his senior year at Mississippi State, he served as head coach of the boys' basketball team at Noxapater High School. Chancellor went on to coach boys' and girls' basketball at Horn Lake High School and Harrison Central High School in Mississippi. He received his master's degree in physical education from the University of Mississippi in 1973.

== Coaching career ==
=== Ole Miss ===
Chancellor spent 19 seasons (1978–1997) as the head coach of the University of Mississippi Rebels, compiling an overall record of 439–154 (.740). As the Ole Miss head coach, Chancellor guided the Rebels to the NCAA tournament 14 times, including 11 consecutive appearances from 1982 to 1992.

Chancellor's teams won at least 20 games 15 times, including a school-record 31 wins in 1978–1979. He also led the Rebels to top 20 final rankings 13 times, with top 10 finishes four times (#5 in 1992, #6 in 1985, #8 in 1987, and #10 in 1984).

Chancellor led Ole Miss to the Elite Eight at the NCAA tournament four times, while his teams made the Sweet 16 on three other occasions. Chancellor was named the Southeastern Conference Coach of the Year three times, including the 1992 season when the Rebels were 29–3 overall and claimed the SEC regular season title with a perfect 11–0 mark. He was also named the 1992 National Women's Basketball Coach of the Year by the Women's Basketball News Service.

=== Houston Comets ===
When the Women's National Basketball Association started with eight expansion teams in 1997, Chancellor had applied for six of the teams with doubt that he would be hired. However, he was hired by the Comets (as owned by Leslie Alexander, part of the plan for certain teams to be operated by NBA owners), to coach the team, and he believed that the team would be special from the very get go due to the talents of Cynthia Cooper (who had led USA to a gold medal in the 1988 Olympics and silver in 1992 while playing in European leagues) in practice. Houston was bolstered by fellow player allocation Sheryl Swoopes (who had led Texas Tech to the 1993 NCAA title) and WNBA draft pick Tina Thompson to make a Big Three trio, all of whom would be inducted into the Naismith Memorial Basketball Hall of Fame. The 1997 season did not go without hitches, as Thompson and Cooper wanted less rigid patterns from Chancellor when it came to offensive sets, which they responded by setting ball screens on the perimeter; Swoopes did not play until the second half of the season due to her pregnancy. They won four of their first seven games before closing out the season on a 14-7 run to finish 18-10, the best record of the eight teams; in the four-team playoff, they won both games (including a 65-51 victory over the New York Liberty, who had beaten Houston three out of four times in the regular season) to win the inaugural WNBA championship. To build chemistry, he set up a three-player committee composed of a young player, a mid-level player, and an older player. Chancellor cited the help of NBA coach Rudy Tomjanovich in asserting the importance of training camp and the nature of motivating college players.

In the 1998 WNBA Championship, now a best-of-three series, the Comets lost a nail-biting Game 1 to the Phoenix Mercury. In Game 2, the Comets trailed by 12 with seven minutes remaining, and Chancellor called time-out. Trying to get the words out, point guard Kim Perrot (considered the "stick of dynamite" of the team) took over to speak to the team, with Cooper and Thompson later citing her rallying speech as the moment that got the team back on track. The Comets rallied to force overtime before winning the game. In Game 3, they won by nine to clinch their second title. During the 1999 season Perrot was diagnosed with lung cancer (which led to her death on August 19), saw them go 26-6 before they rolled to a third straight title with four playoff wins to two losses. 2000 was their most dominant playoff run. They were not first in the league. They swept their first-round opponent to have a key matchup with the Los Angeles Sparks, who had lost four games all year. They swept the Sparks in two games to meet up against New York. In the 2000 WNBA Championship, they beat the Liberty 59–52 and 79–73 (overtime) to clinch their fourth league championship. They were the first basketball team to win four straight league titles since the Boston Celtics in the late 1960s and the first four-peat since the 1980-1983 New York Islanders.

Cooper retired after the 2000 season ended, and Swoopes missed the 2000 season with an Anterior cruciate ligament injury. Their playoff dominance ended with their first playoff loss (in a straight two-game sweep) to the Sparks in 2001. Cooper briefly returned in 2003. They lost in the first round two more times before they missed the playoffs in 2004 with a 13-21 record, Chancellor's only losing season as coach. They won one postseason series after the 2000 season ended.

Under Chancellor, the Comets were the only team in the WNBA to make the playoffs in each of the first seven seasons of the league. His 1998 Houston Comets team holds the record for highest winning percentage in the history of both the National Basketball Association (NBA) and Women's National Basketball Association (NBA) basketball with .900 when the Comets went 27–3. In his ten seasons with the Houston Comets, Chancellor posted a 211–111 record (.655), making him the winningest coach in the history of the WNBA until 2013. Chancellor was named the WNBA Coach of the Year three times (1997, 1998, 1999) He coached the Western Conference All-Star Team three times during his career and was named the coach of the WNBA's All-Decade Team in June 2006.

During his time as head coach of the Comets, Chancellor also served as a television analyst for women's college basketball, working for both ESPN and SEC-TV. In the fall of 2006, Alexander announced the sale of the Comets. On January 3, 2007, Chancellor resigned.

=== USA Basketball ===
Chancellor served as coach in international competition for the United States National Team. His teams won first place at the 2002 Opals World Challenge, a gold medal at the 2002 FIBA World Championships, and a gold medal at the 2004 Summer Olympics.

Chancellor served as the head coach to the National team in the 2002 World Championships, held during September in three cities in China, including Nanjing, China. The USA won the opening six preliminary rounds easily, with no contest closer than 30 points. That included the opening round game against Russia, who has played them close at the 1998 Championship final. In the opening game, the USA won 89–55 behind 20 points form Lisa Leslie and 17 from Sheryl Swoopes. The USA wasn't seriously challenged in the quarterfinals, where they beat Spain by 39 points. The semifinal game against Australia was closer, but Leslie had a double-double with 24 points and 13 rebounds to help the USA team win by 15 points. In the championship game, much like the 1998 finals, the rematch was much closer. This time the USA team did not have to play from behind, and they had a ten-point lead late in the game, but the Russians cut the lead to a single point with just over three minutes remaining. The game remained close, and it was within three points with just over twelve seconds to go, but Swoopes was fouled and sank the free throws to give the USA a 79–74 win and the gold medal. Chancellor went 38–0 for team USA.

=== LSU Lady Tigers ===
In his first year as head coach at LSU, Chancellor led the Lady Tigers to an SEC championship game and to the Final Four. He was also named 2008 SEC Coach of the Year. Chancellor resigned on March 16, 2011. He spent the rest of his contract as an assistant to Athletic Director Joe Alleva. Chancellor spent four seasons at LSU.

== Post-coaching career ==
Chancellor continued his work as a color commentator after retirement, working Southland Conference games on ESPN's family of networks. In 2022, he joined Houston Baptist University as a color commentator for its men and women's basketball home games.

== Personal life ==
Chancellor is married to Betty and they have 2 children and 4 grandsons. One of Chancellor's grandsons, Zack, played college golf at the University of New Orleans.

== Head coaching record ==
Record table
Season	Team	Overall	Conference	Standing	Postseason
Ole Miss Rebels (SEC) (1978–1997)
1978–79	Ole Miss	31–9			
1979–80	Ole Miss	23–14			
1980–81	Ole Miss	14–12			
1981–82	Ole Miss	27–5	7-1		NCAA First Round
1982–83	Ole Miss	26–6	6-2		NCAA First Round
1983–84	Ole Miss	24–6	6-2		NCAA Second Round
1984–85	Ole Miss	29–3	8-0		NCAA Elite Eight
1985–86	Ole Miss	24–8	6-3	T-2nd	NCAA Elite Eight
1986–87	Ole Miss	25–5	7-2	T-2nd	NCAA Sweet Sixteen
1987–88	Ole Miss	24–7	5-4	T-4th	NCAA Sweet Sixteen
1988–89	Ole Miss	23–8	4-5	6th	NCAA Elite Eight
1989–90	Ole Miss	22–10	7-2	T-2nd	NCAA Sweet Sixteen
1990–91	Ole Miss	20–9	5-6	T-5th	NCAA First Round
1991–92	Ole Miss	29–3	11-0	1st	NCAA Elite Eight
1992–93	Ole Miss	19–10	4–7	T-8th	
1993–94	Ole Miss	24–9	7-4	T-4th	NCAA Second Round
1994–95	Ole Miss	21–8	6-5	7th	NCAA First Round
1995–96	Ole Miss	18–11	6-5	T-5th	NCAA First Round
1996–97	Ole Miss	16–11	5-7	T-7th	
Ole Miss:		371–119 (.757)	41–19 (.683)		
LSU Tigers (SEC) (2007–2011)
2007–08	LSU	31–6	14-0	1st	NCAA Final Four
2008–09	LSU	19–11	10–4	T-2nd	NCAA Second Round
2009–10	LSU	21–10	14-0	1st	NCAA Second Round
2010–11	LSU	19–13	8–8	T-5th	
LSU:		90–40 (.692)	41–19 (.683)		
Total:		461–159 (.744)			
National champion Postseason invitational champion Conference regular season champion Conference regular season and conference tournament champion Division regular season champion Division regular season and conference tournament champion Conference tournament champion

=== Houston Comets ===
Legend
Regular season	G	Games coached	W	Games won	L	Games lost	W–L %	Win–loss %
Playoffs	PG	Playoff games	PW	Playoff wins	PL	Playoff losses	PW–L %	Playoff win–loss %

Team	Year	G	W	L	W–L%	Finish	PG	PW	PL	PW–L%	Result
HOU	1997	28	18	10	.643	1st in Eastern	2	2	0	1.000	Won WNBA Championship
HOU	1998	30	27	3	.900	1st in Western	5	4	1	.800	Won WNBA Championship
HOU	1999	32	26	6	.813	1st in Western	6	4	2	.667	Won WNBA Championship
HOU	2000	32	27	5	.844	2nd in Western	6	6	0	1.000	Won WNBA Championship
HOU	2001	32	19	13	.594	4th in Western	2	0	2	.000	Lost in Conference Semifinals
HOU	2002	32	24	8	.750	2nd in Western	3	1	2	..333	Lost in Conference Semifinals
HOU	2003	34	20	14	.588	2nd in Western	3	1	2	.333	Lost in Conference Semifinals
HOU	2004	34	13	21	.382	6th in Western	—	—	—	—	Missed playoffs
HOU	2005	34	19	15	.559	3rd in Western	5	2	3	.400	Lost in Conference Finals
HOU	2006	34	18	16	.529	3rd in Western	2	0	2	.000	Lost in Conference Semifinals
Career		322	211	111	.655		34	20	14	.588	

=== USA Basketball ===
Year	Team	Event	Record	Finish
2002	U.S. National Team	WBCA All Star Challenge	1–0	–
2002	U.S. National Team	Opals World Challenge	4–0	1st Place
2002	U.S. National Team	FIBA World Championships	9–0	Gold Medal
2004	U.S. National Team	Pre-Olympics Exhibition Games	16–0	–
2004	U.S. National Team	Olympics	8–0	Gold Medal

== See also ==
- List of WNBA head coaches
