= 1997 Houston Comets season =

- WNBA champions
- Head coach: Van Chancellor
- Arena: The Summit

Results
- Record: 18–10 (.643)
- Place: 1st (Eastern)
- Playoff finish: Won WNBA Finals

The 1997 WNBA season was the first season for the Houston Comets. The Comets won the inaugural WNBA Finals.

== Transactions ==
=== WNBA allocation draft ===
Player	Nationality	School/Team/Country
Cynthia Cooper	United States	USC
Sheryl Swoopes	United States	Texas Tech

=== WNBA elite draft ===
Round	Pick	Player	Nationality	School/Team/Country
1	5	Wanda Guyton	United States	South Florida
2	13	Janeth Arcain	Brazil	Brazil

=== WNBA draft ===
Round	Pick	Player	Nationality	School/Team/Country
1	1	Tina Thompson	United States	USC
2	16	Tammy Jackson	United States	Florida
3	17	Racquel Spurlock	United States	Louisiana Tech
4	32	Catarina Pollini	Italy	Texas

=== Transactions ===
Date	Transaction
January 22, 1997	Drafted Cynthia Cooper and Sheryl Swoopes in the 1997 WNBA Allocation Draft
February 27, 1997	Drafted Wanda Guyton and Janeth Arcain in the 1997 WNBA Elite Draft
April 28, 1997	Drafted Tina Thompson, Tammy Jackson, Racquel Spurlock and Catarina Pollini in the 1997 WNBA draft
April 28, 1997	Hired Van Chancellor as Head Coach

== Roster ==
1997 Houston Comets roster
Players
Coaches

Pos.	No.	Nat.	Name	Height	Weight	DOB	From	Yrs
G	9	(Brazil)	Arcain, Janeth	5' 11" (1.8m)	147 lb (67kg)	1969-04-11		R
G	14	(United States)	Cooper, Cynthia	5' 10" (1.78m)	150 lb (68kg)	1963-04-14	USC	R
G/F	8	(Trinidad and Tobago)	Gay, Pietra	5' 11" (1.8m)		1974-08-21	LSU	R
C	4	(United States)	Guyton, Wanda	6' 1" (1.85m)	178 lb (81kg)	1968-10-14	South Florida	R
G/F	20	(United States)	Harris, Fran	6' 0" (1.83m)	153 lb (69kg)	1965-03-12	Texas	R
F/C	23	(United States)	Jackson, Tammy	6' 2" (1.88m)	190 lb (86kg)	1962-12-03	Florida	R
F/C	33	(United States)	Moore, Yolanda	6' 0" (1.83m)	175 lb (79kg)	1974-07-01	Mississippi	R
G	10	(United States)	Perrot, Kim	5' 5" (1.65m)	130 lb (59kg)	1967-01-18	Louisiana	R
F	11	(Italy)	Pollini, Catarina	6' 5" (1.96m)		1966-03-16	Texas	R
G/F	22	(United States)	Swoopes, Sheryl	6' 0" (1.83m)	145 lb (66kg)	1971-03-25	Texas Tech	R
F	7	(United States)	Thompson, Tina	6' 2" (1.88m)	178 lb (81kg)	1975-02-10	USC	R
G	5	(United States)	Woosley, Tiffany	5' 7" (1.7m)	132 lb (60kg)	1973-04-26	Tennessee	R

Head coach
(United States) Van Chancellor (Mississippi State)
Assistant coaches
(United States) Peggie Gillom

Legend

- (C) Team captain
- (DP) Unsigned draft pick
- (FA) Free agent
- (S) Suspended
- Injured

== Schedule ==
=== Regular season ===
1997 game log
Total: 18–10 (Home: 9–5; Road: 9–5)
June: 4–1 (Home: 2–1; Road: 2–0)

Game	Date	Team	Score	High points	High rebounds	High assists	Location Attendance	Record
1	June 21	@ Cleveland	W 76–56	Cynthia Cooper (25)	Cynthia Cooper (8)	Cynthia Cooper (2)	Gund Arena	1–0
2	June 24	Phoenix	W 72–55	Janeth Arcain (23)	Janeth Arcain (8)	Cynthia Cooper (3)	The Summit	2–0
3	June 26	New York	L 60–62 (OT)	Cynthia Cooper (20)	Wanda Guyton (9)	Cynthia Cooper (3)	The Summit	2–1
4	June 28	@ Utah	W 76–58	Cynthia Cooper (20)	Wanda Guyton (9)	Cynthia Cooper (3)	Delta Center	3–1
5	June 30	Los Angeles	W 71–66 (OT)	Janeth Arcain (17)	Tammy Jackson (8)	Cynthia Cooper (5)	The Summit	4–1

July : 6–5 (Home: 3–2; Road: 3–3)

Game	Date	Team	Score	High points	High rebounds	High assists	Location Attendance	Record
6	July 2	@ New York	L 67–72	Cynthia Cooper (19)	Wanda Guyton (8)	Cynthia Cooper (6)	Madison Square Garden	4–2
7	July 4	New York	L 58–65	Tina Thompson (15)	Arcain; Harris (7)	Cynthia Cooper (8)	The Summit	4–3
8	July 7	Charlotte	W 74–56	Cynthia Cooper (21)	Tina Thompson (9)	Cynthia Cooper (6)	The Summit	5–3
9	July 9	@ Phoenix	L 64–69	Cynthia Cooper (16)	Tina Thompson (7)	Kim Perrot (4)	America West Arena	5–4
10	July 12	Sacramento	W 89–61	Cynthia Cooper (20)	Tina Thompson (10)	Cynthia Cooper (8)	The Summit	6–4
11	July 14	Utah	W 79–56	Arcain; Guyton (17)	Fran Harris (8)	Kim Perrot (4)	The Summit	7–4
12	July 16	@ Los Angeles	L 52–77	Cooper; Thompson (17)	Janeth Arcain (8)	Arcain; Cooper (3)	Great Western Forum	7–5
13	July 18	@ Sacramento	W 82–60	Cynthia Cooper (19)	Tammy Jackson (12)	Kim Perrot (7)	ARCO Arena	8–5
14	July 23	@ Phoenix	W 77–69	Cynthia Cooper (32)	Janeth Arcain (7)	Cynthia Cooper (6)	America West Arena	9–5
15	July 25	@ Sacramento	W 86–76	Cynthia Cooper (44)	Wanda Guyton (7)	Janeth Arcain (5)	ARCO Arena	10–5
16	July 29	Cleveland	L 64–73	Tina Thompson (24)	Tina Thompson (9)	Cynthia Cooper (5)	The Summit	10–6

August : 8–4 (Home: 4–2; Road: 4–2)

Game	Date	Team	Score	High points	High rebounds	High assists	Location Attendance	Record
17	August 1	@ Los Angeles	W 81–57	Cynthia Cooper (34)	Tina Thompson (9)	Cynthia Cooper (5)	Great Western Forum	11–6
18	August 2	@ Utah	L 63–74	Tina Thompson (20)	Tammy Jackson (6)	Cooper; Thompson (5)	Delta Center	11–7
19	August 5	@ Cleveland	W 76–66	Cynthia Cooper (30)	Janeth Arcain (8)	Cynthia Cooper (6)	Gund Arena	12–7
20	August 7	Phoenix	W 74–70	Cynthia Cooper (34)	Tina Thompson (10)	Kim Perrot (6)	The Summit	13–7
21	August 9	Los Angeles	W 72–71 (2OT)	Kim Perrot (19)	Tina Thompson (10)	Cynthia Cooper (8)	The Summit	14–7
22	August 11	@ Charlotte	W 72–62	Cynthia Cooper (39)	Tammy Jackson (7)	Kim Perrot (7)	Charlotte Coliseum	15–7
23	August 12	Utah	W 76–56	Cynthia Cooper (21)	Guyton; Thompson (7)	Kim Perrot (5)	The Summit	16–7
24	August 16	@ Charlotte	L 71–80	Sheryl Swoopes (20)	Tina Thompson (6)	Kim Perrot (7)	Charlotte Coliseum	16–8
25	August 17	@ New York	W 70–55	Cynthia Cooper (17)	Jackson | Thompson (12)	Kim Perrot (6)	Madison Square Garden	17–8
26	August 19	Charlotte	W 77–69	Cynthia Cooper (31)	Wanda Guyton (10)	Cooper; Thompson (4)	The Summit	18–8
27	August 21	Cleveland	L 75–76	Kim Perrot (18)	Wanda Guyton (10)	Cynthia Cooper (9)	The Summit	18–9
28	August 24	Sacramento	L 58–68	Cynthia Cooper (16)	Tina Thompson (9)	Cynthia Cooper (5)	The Summit	18–10

1997 season schedule

=== Playoffs ===
1997 playoff game log
Semifinal vs. Charlotte Sting

Game	Date	Team	Score	High points	High rebounds	High assists	Location Attendance	Series
1	August 28	Charlotte	W 54–70	Cynthia Cooper (31)	Tina Thompson (12)	Cynthia Cooper (5)	The Summit	1–0

Championship vs. New York Liberty

Game	Date	Team	Score	High points	High rebounds	High assists	Location Attendance	Series
1	August 30	New York	W 65–51	Cynthia Cooper (25)	Tammy Jackson (11)	Cynthia Cooper (4)	The Summit	1–0

1997 playoff schedule

=== Season standings ===
Eastern Conference	W	L	PCT	Conf.	GB
Houston Comets ^{x}	18	10	.643	6–6	–
New York Liberty ^{x}	17	11	.607	8–4	1.0
Charlotte Sting ^{x}	15	13	.536	5–7	3.0
Cleveland Rockers ^{o}	15	13	.536	5–7	3.0

== Statistics ==
Legend
GP	Games played	GS	Games started	MPG	Minutes per game	RPG	Rebounds per game
APG	Assists per game	SPG	Steals per game	BPG	Blocks per game	PPG	Points per game
FG%	Field-goal percentage	3P%	3-point field-goal percentage	FT%	Free-throw percentage	TO	Turnovers per game
PF	Fouls per game		Team leader		League leader

=== Regular season ===
Player	GP	GS	MPG	FG%	3P%	FT%	RPG	APG	SPG	BPG	PPG
Cynthia Cooper	28	28	35.1	.470	.414	.864	4.0	4.7	2.1	0.2	22.2
Tina Thompson	28	28	31.6	.418	.370	.838	6.6	1.1	0.8	2.2	13.2
Janeth Arcain	28	27	28.0	.440	.273	.894	3.9	1.6	1.5	2.4	10.9
Wanda Guyton	25	25	26.7	.467	N/A	.559	5.4	0.5	1.0	1.7	6.1
Kim Perrot	28	24	24.7	.364	.283	.405	2.7	3.1	2.5	2.3	5.8
Tammy Jackson	28	3	19.5	.409	.000	.610	4.1	0.4	1.6	1.8	4.1
Tiffany Woosley	26	4	15.3	.330	.320	.250	1.1	1.1	0.7	1.2	2.9
Fran Harris	25	1	14.8	.346	.333	.710	2.2	1.0	0.7	1.2	4.2
Sheryl Swoopes	9	0	14.3	.472	.250	.714	1.7	0.8	0.8	0.4	7.1
Yolanda Moore	13	0	7.2	.250	N/A	.500	1.0	0.1	0.1	0.5	1.2
Catarina Pollini	13	0	7.2	.364	N/A	.500	0.9	0.4	0.3	0.7	1.7
Pietra Gay	5	0	2.4	.500	N/A	.400	0.6	0.4	0.2	0.8	0.8

^{‡}Waived/Released during the season
^{†}Traded during the season
^{≠}Acquired during the season

- Janeth Arcain ranked second in the WNBA in Free Throw Pct with .894
- Cynthia Cooper ranked fifth in the WNBA in assists with 131.
- Cynthia Cooper ranked sixth in the WNBA in Field Goal Percentage (.470)
- Cynthia Cooper ranked third in the WNBA in Free Throw Pct with .864
- Cynthia Cooper ranked first in the WNBA in field goals with 191.
- Cynthia Cooper ranked first in the WNBA in points with 621.
- Cynthia Cooper ranked fifth in the WNBA in minutes per game with 35.1
- Cynthia Cooper ranked fifth in the WNBA in steals with 59.
- Kim Perrot ranked ninth in the WNBA in assists with 88.
- Kim Perrot ranked third in the WNBA in steals with 69.
- Tina Thompson ranked ninth in the WNBA in points with 370 points.-
- Tina Thompson ranked seventh in the WNBA in total rebounds with 184
- Tina Thompson ranked ninth in the WNBA in points per game with 13.2
- Tina Thompson ranked seventh in the WNBA in Free Throw Pct with .838
- Tina Thompson tied for fifth in the WNBA in blocks with 28.

== Awards and honors ==
- Cynthia Cooper, WNBA Most Valuable Player Award
- Cynthia Cooper, WNBA Finals MVP Award
- Cynthia Cooper, Guard, All-WNBA First Team
- Cynthia Cooper: Led WNBA, Field Goals 191
- Cynthia Cooper: Led WNBA, 3-Pt Field Goals, 67
- Cynthia Cooper: Led WNBA, Free Throws, 172
- Cynthia Cooper: Led WNBA, Free Throw Attempts, 199
- Cynthia Cooper: Led WNBA, Points, 621
- Cynthia Cooper: Led WNBA, Points per game, 22.2
- Cynthia Cooper: Ranked third in the WNBA in minutes played, 982
- Wanda Guyton: Second in WNBA (tied), Offensive Rebounds, 76
- Tina Thompson, Forward, All-WNBA First Team
- Van Chancellor, Coach of the Year
