= Wanda Guyton =

American basketball player and coach (born 1965)

Personal information
- Born: October 14, 1965 (age 60) Tampa, Florida, U.S.
- Listed height: 6 ft 1 in (1.85 m)

Career information
- High school: Hillsborough (Tampa, Florida)
- College: South Florida (1984–1989)
- Position: Center

Career history
- 1997–1998: Houston Comets
- 1999: Detroit Shock

Career highlights
- 2× WNBA champion (1997–1998); No. 50 retired by South Florida Bulls; Sun Belt Player of the Year (1989); First-team All-Sun Belt (1989)
- Stats at WNBA.com
- Stats at Basketball Reference

Wanda Marie Guyton (born October 14, 1965) is an American former professional basketball player. She coaches women's professional basketball in Wasserburg, Germany.

== Early life ==
Guyton played at Hillsborough High School (Tampa, Florida) (1981–1984) where she led the lady Terriers in scoring as their center, in her three seasons at HHS. She was the first female basketball player to break the 1,000 point scoring threshold, in becoming Hillsborough County's girls all-time leading scorer in her senior year, without the benefit of the three point shot. All while leading the lady Terriers to their first ever FHSAA Girls Class 4A State Basketball Championship final in 1984, earning State Runner-ups, after a 31 -37 loss to Deland High in the title game.

== College career ==
Wanda was a torchbearer for the University of South Florida women's basketball program. She put the program on the map and made a name for herself on a national level as a two-time WNBA champion and standout in the Italian and German leagues. Guyton was a member of the women's basketball team during the 1984–85, 1986–87 and 1988–89 seasons and played primarily as post player who saw time as a forward and center. Her dominance of the USF record books is unparalleled. Guyton still owns 10 career records today, almost 20 seasons after completing her college eligibility. In 2009, Wanda Guyton was inducted into the USF Athletic Hall of Fame.

== Professional career ==
=== International/FIBA ===
After graduating from USF, Guyton played professionally in Japan, Italy, Spain and Germany. And later, after her exit from the WNBA as a player, Guyton returned to Germany to play for Wasserburg, where she finished out her 18-year professional career as a player, retiring in 2007.

=== WNBA ===
Guyton's professional basketball career, came full circle, when she returned to the US, after being selected by the Houston Comets in the first round (No. 5 overall) in the 1997 WNBA Elite Draft. Her debut game was played on June 21, 1997 in a 76 - 56 win over the Cleveland Rockers where she recorded 4 points, 3 rebounds and 1 block. Guyton would average 6.1 points and 5.4 rebounds as a starter for the Comets in her rookie season and won a championship with the club in the inaugural WNBA Finals.

In the 1998 season, Guyton would only play in the Comets opening game on June 13, 1998 but then miss the rest of the season entirely. Playing two seasons with Houston and in a total of 26 games, Guyton averaged 5.8 points and 5.2 rebounds. Although she only played one game in 1998, she would be awarded a championship ring when the Comets won in 1998 as well.

Guyton was waived by Houston on June 8, 1999 and would miss the first month and a half of the 1999 WNBA season. Fortunately, on July 28, 1999, she was able to sign with the Detroit Shock and played in 11 of the Shock's remaining 12 season games. The Shock finished with a losing record of 15 - 17 but was still able to make the playoffs, where they would be eliminated by the Charlotte Sting on August 24, 1999 (a game that Guyton actually did not play in).

The Shock waived Guyton on May 22, 2000 right before the start of the next season. Guyton would not be signed by another team after being waived by Detroit. And because she didn't play during the 1999 playoffs, her final WNBA game was a regular season matchup versus the Orlando Miracle on August 21, 1999. In that game, the Shock defeated the Miracle 74 - 68 with Guyton playing for nearly 3 minutes and recording 2 rebounds.

== Career statistics ==
Legend
GP	Games played	GS	Games started	MPG	Minutes per game	RPG	Rebounds per game
APG	Assists per game	SPG	Steals per game	BPG	Blocks per game	PPG	Points per game
TO	Turnovers per game	FG%	Field-goal percentage	3P%	3-point field-goal percentage	FT%	Free-throw percentage
**Bold**	Career best	°	League leader

=== WNBA ===
==== Regular season ====
Year	Team	GP	GS	MPG	FG%	3P%	FT%	RPG	APG	SPG	BPG	TO	PPG
1997^{†}	Houston	**25**	**25**	**26.7**	**.467**	—	.559	**5.4**	**0.5**	**1.0**	**0.3**	1.7	**6.1**
1998	Houston	1	1	14.0	.000	—	—	0.0	0.0	**1.0**	1.0	2.0	0.0
1999	Detroit	11	0	8.9	.235	—	**.813**	2.4	0.2	0.2	0.2	**0.9**	1.9
Career	3 years, 2 teams	37	26	21.1	.436	—	.607	4.4	0.4	0.8	0.3	1.5	4.7

==== Playoffs ====
Year	Team	GP	GS	MPG	FG%	3P%	FT%	RPG	APG	SPG	BPG	TO	PPG
1997^{†}	Houston	1	1	23.0	.500	—	—	4.0	0.0	0.0	0.0	0.0	2.0

=== College ===
Year	Team	GP	GS	MPG	FG%	3P%	FT%	RPG	APG	SPG	BPG	TO	PPG
1987–88	South Florida	25	-	-	**60.6**	0.0	63.4	12.4	0.6	1.8	0.9	-	19.9
1988–89	South Florida	**27**	-	-	56.3	0.0	**66.5**	**14.0**	**1.1**	**3.4**	0.9	-	**20.3**
**Career**		52	-	-	58.4	0.0	65.2	13.2	0.8	2.7	0.9	-	20.1
Statistics retrieved from Sports-Reference.
