= Amaya Valdemoro =

Spanish basketball player (born 1976)

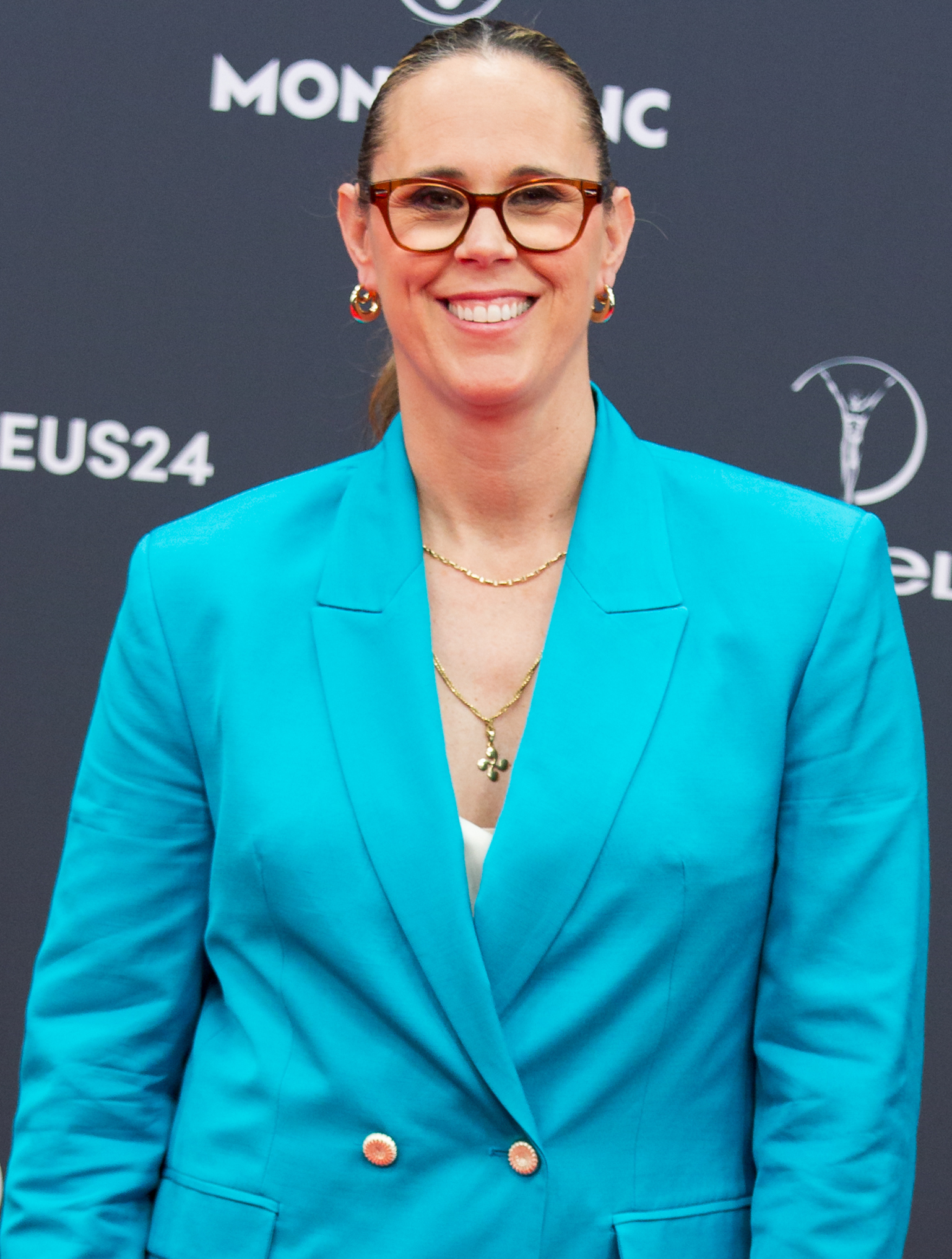
- Valdemoro at the 25th Laureus World Sports Awards in 2024

Personal information
- Born: August 18, 1976 (age 50) Alcobendas, Community of Madrid
- Listed height: 182 cm (6 ft 0 in)

Career information
- Playing career: 1992–2013
- Position: Small forward

Career history
- 1992–1994: Dorna Godella
- 1994-1996: Halcón Viajes
- 1996-1998: Pool Getafe
- 1998-2000: Houston Comets
- 1998-2001: Halcón Viajes
- 2001–2005: Ros Casares Valencia
- 2005–2007: CSKA Samara
- 2007-2008: CSKA Moscow
- 2008-2010: Ros Casares Valencia
- 2010-2012: Rivas Ecópolis
- 2012-2013: Tarsus Beledeyesi
- 2013: Real Canoe NC

Career highlights
- EuroLeague champion (1993); 3× WNBA champion (1998–2000); 8× Spanish League champion (1993, 1994, 1997, 1998, 2002, 2004, 2009, 2010); 9× Spanish Cup champion (1994, 1997, 1998, 2002–2004, 2009–2011); Russian League champion (2006); 3× Russian Cup champion (2006–2008)
- Stats at Basketball Reference
- Women's Basketball Hall of Fame
- FIBA Hall of Fame

Amaya Valdemoro Madariaga (born August 18, 1976, in Alcobendas, Community of Madrid) is a Spanish former basketball player. She won three Women's National Basketball Association (WNBA) championship rings with the Houston Comets, one EuroLeague title with Dorna Godella, as well as eight Spanish league title and one Russian Premier League title. She was the Russian League Player of the Year in 2006.

With the national team she competed in two Olympic Games, Athens 2004 and Beijing 2008. won a bronze medal at the 2010 FIBA World Championship and won 5 medals at EuroBasket women, including a gold medal at the 2013 EuroBasket Women.

== Club career ==
=== 1992-1998: Spanish clubs ===
She made her debut in the Spanish league in 1992, at only 16 years of age, with Dorna Godella, winning the national league and the 1992–93 Euroleague. In the 1993–1994 season, she won the league, the cup and was Euroleague runner-up. With her following club, Pool Getafe she won back-to-back league and cup titles in 1997 and 1998, and again Euroleague runner-up in 1998.

=== 1998-2000: WNBA ===
Valdemoro was selected with the 30th overall pick (3rd round) in the 1998 WNBA draft by the Houston Comets, winning three consecutive championship rings in 1998, 1999 and 2000.

=== 1998-2005: Spanish clubs ===
After playing for both the Houston Comets and Halcón Viajes Salamanca for three seasons, she went back to Valencia, having the club changed its name to Ros Casares, going to win 2 leagues and 3 cups. She would have a brief spell at Brazilian team Unimed/Americana in 2004.

=== 2005-2008: Russian clubs ===
She spent the next three seasons in the Russian Premier League, with BC Volgaburmash Samara and then CSKA Moscow, winning 1 league and 3 cups.

=== 2008-2013: Spanish clubs ===
Returning to play for Ros Casares Valencia, she won back-to-back league and cup titles in 2009 and 2010, as well as Euroleague runner-up in 2009–10 EuroLeague. She spent two more seasons in her hometown, playing for Rivas Ecópolis, winning the 2011 Spanish cup and leading the team to the 2011–12 EuroLeague final.

After a brief stint in Turkey, her last club was Real Canoe NC.

== National team ==
She made her debut with Spain women's national basketball team at the age of 17. She played with the senior team for 18 years, from 1995 to 2013. She is one of the most capped players with a total of 258 caps and 10.6 PPG. She participated in two Olympic Games (Athens 2004 and Beijing 2008), four World Championships and eight European Championships, retiring from the national team as captain and champion in the 2013 EuroBasket:

- 1993 FIBA Europe Under-16 Championship for Women (youth)
- 1994 FIBA Europe Under-18 Championship for Women (youth)
- 9th 1995 Eurobasket
- 5th 1997 Eurobasket
- 5th 1998 World Championship
- 5th 2002 World Championship
- 2003 Eurobasket
- 6th 2004 Summer Olympics
- 2005 Eurobasket
- 8th 2006 World Championship
- 2007 Eurobasket (MVP)
- 5th 2008 Summer Olympics
- 2009 Eurobasket
- 2010 World Championship
- 9th 2011 Eurobasket
- 2013 Eurobasket

== Career statistics ==
Legend
GP	Games played	GS	Games started	MPG	Minutes per game	RPG	Rebounds per game
APG	Assists per game	SPG	Steals per game	BPG	Blocks per game	PPG	Points per game
TO	Turnovers per game	FG%	Field-goal percentage	3P%	3-point field-goal percentage	FT%	Free-throw percentage
**Bold**	Career best	°	League leader

†	Denotes seasons in which Stewart won a WNBA championship

=== WNBA ===
==== Regular season ====
Year	Team	GP	GS	MPG	FG%	3P%	FT%	RPG	APG	SPG	BPG	TO	PPG
1998†	Houston	16	0	3.8	**.500**	**.400**	.706	.6	.4	.4	.1	1.1	1.9
1999†	Houston	17	0	5.4	.371	**.400**	.750	.8	.5	**.6**	.0	.7	2.4
2000†	Houston	**22**	0	**7.8**	.333	.379	**1.000**	**1.0**	**.6**	.4	**.2**	**.6**	**2.6**
Career	3 years, 1 team	55	0	5.9	.369	.385	.769	.8	.5	.5	.1	.8	2.3

==== Playoffs ====
Year	Team	GP	GS	MPG	FG%	3P%	FT%	RPG	APG	SPG	BPG	TO	PPG
1999†	Houston	2	0	2.0	**1.000**	**1.000**	**1.000**	.0	.0	.0	.0	.5	2.5
2000†	Houston	**3**	0	**5.3**	.400	.333	**1.000**	**1.3**	.0	**.3**	.0	.0	**3.0**
Career	2 years, 1 team	5	0	4.0	.500	.500	1.000	.8	.0	.2	.0	.2	2.8
