= Tiffany Woosley =

American basketball player (born 1973)

Personal information
- Born: April 26, 1973 (age 53)
- Listed height: 5 ft 7 in (1.70 m)
- Listed weight: 132 lb (60 kg)

Career information
- High school: Shelbyville (Shelbyville, Tennessee)
- College: Tennessee (1991–1995)
- WNBA draft: 1997: undrafted
- Position: Guard

Career history
- 1997–1998: Houston Comets

Career highlights
- 2× WNBA Champion (1997, 1998); SEC Tournament MVP (1994); First-team All-SEC (1993); SEC All-Freshman Team (1992); Class AAA Tennessee Miss Basketball (1991)
- Stats at Basketball Reference
Medals
Women's basketball
Representing the United States
FIBA Under-18 Americas Championship
Silver medal – second place	1992 Mexico	Team

Tiffany Woosley is a former professional basketball player. In her senior year at University of Tennessee she injured her right knee, sidelining her for the rest of the season. She coached at Lincoln County High School in Fayetteville, Tennessee in the 1996–97 school year before beginning her WNBA career. She currently lives in Shelbyville though previously lived in Tullahoma.

== WNBA ==
Although not drafted, Woosley joined the Houston Comets in 1997 for the WNBA's inaugural season. Her debut game was played on June 21, 1997 in a 76-56 win over the Cleveland Rockers where she recorded six points, one rebound and one assist. She played in 26 of the Comets' 28 games as a backup point guard to Kim Perrot and even started in four of these games in place of Perrot. The Comets finished with a 18-10 record with Woosley averaging 2.9 points, 1.1 rebounds and 1.1 assists per game for the season. Although Woosley did not play any minutes in the team's WNBA Finals game against the New York Liberty, she was awarded a championship ring as a member of the team.

For the 1998 season, Woosley played in less games and less minutes for the team. She played in only 18 of the team's 30 games and played 5.3 minutes a game (down from 15.3 mpg her rookie year). Thus, her productivity dropped across the board as she averaged 1.2 points, 0.4 rebounds and 0.5 assists per game. The Comets finished with a 27-3 record and defeated the Phoenix Mercury to win their 2nd WNBA championship. However, Woosley did not play in any of the team's playoff games. Again, like her rookie year, she was awarded another championship ring since she was a member of the team.

Woosley did not continue to play in the WNBA after the 1998 season. Since she didn't play in any Comets games for the 1998 playoffs, her final WNBA game ever was a regular season game against the Washington Mystics on August 17, 1998 where the Comets defeated the Mystics 110-65 with Woosley recording seven points, three assists, one rebound and one steal. As of November 2023, that 45-point defeat of the Mystics remains the largest margin of victory by a team on the road (the Comets visited the Mystics), and the 3rd largest margin of victory of a WNBA game overall.

== Awards and honors ==
=== College ===
- Two-time All-South Eastern Conference mention
- 4x SEC champion

=== WNBA ===
- 2x WNBA Champion (1997–98)

== Career statistics ==
Legend
GP	Games played	GS	Games started	MPG	Minutes per game	RPG	Rebounds per game
APG	Assists per game	SPG	Steals per game	BPG	Blocks per game	PPG	Points per game
TO	Turnovers per game	FG%	Field-goal percentage	3P%	3-point field-goal percentage	FT%	Free-throw percentage
**Bold**	Career best	°	League leader

=== Regular season ===
Year	Team	GP	GS	MPG	FG%	3P%	FT%	RPG	APG	SPG	BPG	TO	PPG
1997^{†}	Houston	**26**	**4**	**15.3**	**.330**	**.320**	.250	**1.1**	**1.1**	**0.7**	0.0	1.2	**2.9**
1998^{†}	Houston	18	0	5.3	.304	.250	**.714**	0.4	0.5	0.4	0.0	**0.7**	1.2
Career	2 years, 1 team	44	4	11.2	.324	.306	.467	0.8	0.9	0.6	0.0	1.0	2.2

=== Playoffs ===
Year	Team	GP	GS	MPG	FG%	3P%	FT%	RPG	APG	SPG	BPG	TO	PPG
1997^{†}	Houston	1	0	3.0	—	—	—	0.0	0.0	0.0	0.0	1.0	0.0

=== College ===
Year	Team	GP	GS	MPG	FG%	3P%	FT%	RPG	APG	SPG	BPG	TO	PPG
1991–92	Tennessee	31	-	-	42.4	40.6	79.3	2.1	1.9	0.8	**0.1**	-	8.9
1992–93	Tennessee	32	-	-	37.0	33.6	82.7	2.4	2.9	**1.6**	0.0	-	11.5
1993–94	Tennessee	**33**	-	-	**45.2**	**45.5**	**88.0**	2.0	**3.2**	1.0	**0.1**	-	**11.9**
1994–95	Tennessee	8	-	-	30.8	38.7	55.6	**2.6**	1.0	1.5	**0.1**	-	7.4
**Career**		104	-	-	40.5	39.1	81.6	2.2	2.5	1.2	0.1	-	10.5
Statistics retrieved from Sports-Reference.
