= Janeth Arcain =

Brazilian basketball player (born 1969)

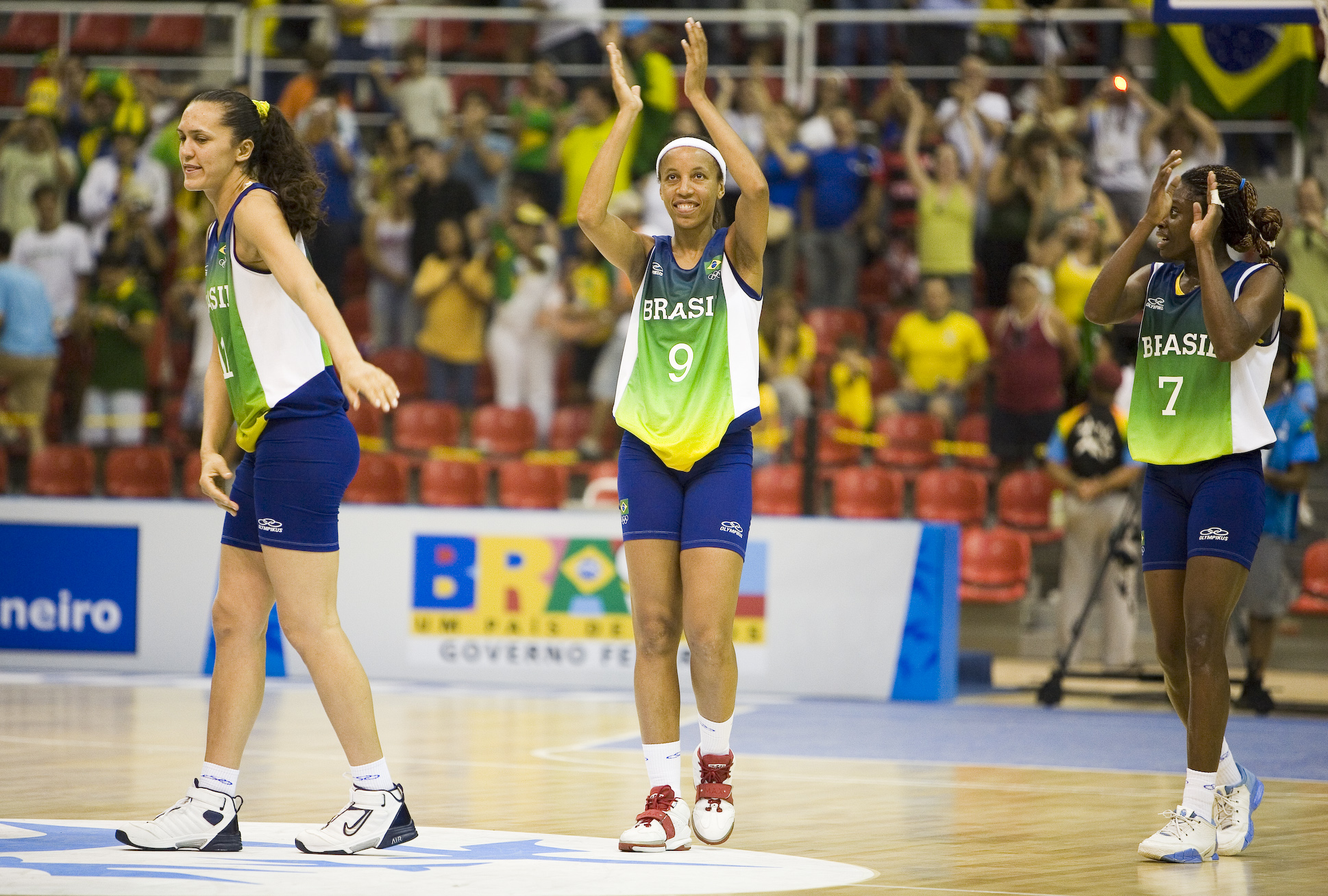
- Janeth in 2007

Personal information
- Born: April 11, 1969 (age 57) São Paulo, Brazil
- Listed height: 5 ft 11 in (1.80 m)
- Listed weight: 147 lb (67 kg)

Career information
- WNBA draft: 1997: 2nd round, 13th overall pick
- Drafted by: Houston Comets
- Playing career: 1983–2007
- Position: Small forward / Shooting guard
- Number: 9

Career history
- 1997–2003, 2005: Houston Comets

Career highlights
- 4× WNBA champion (1997–2000); WNBA All-Star (2001); All-WNBA First Team (2001); WNBA Most Improved Player Award (2001)
- Stats at WNBA.com
- Stats at Basketball Reference
- Women's Basketball Hall of Fame
- FIBA Hall of Fame
Medals
Women's basketball
Representing Brazil
Summer Olympics
Silver medal – second place	1996 Atlanta
Bronze medal – third place	2000 Sydney
World Cup
Gold medal – first place	1994 Australia
Pan American Games
Gold medal – first place	1991 Havana
Silver medal – second place	1987 Indianapolis
Silver medal – second place	2007 Rio

Janeth dos Santos Arcain (Portuguese pronunciation: [ʒaˈnɛtʃi dus ˈsɐ̃tuz aʁˈkɐ̃j], born April 11, 1969) is a Brazilian former professional women's basketball player. She played in the United States for the Houston Comets in the Women's National Basketball Association (WNBA) from 1997 to 2005.

Arcain is one of the players inducted in the Women's Basketball Hall of Fame in 2015. She was inducted into the FIBA Hall of Fame in 2019.

== WNBA career ==
Arcain was one of the original players selected from the WNBA's inaugural season in 1997. She was selected 13th overall in the second round of the Elite draft by the Houston Comets. She played every Comets game in the first seven seasons of the WNBA before skipping the 2004 season to prepare for the Olympics. A key piece of the Comets dynasty that included four championships from 1997 to 2000, Arcain had her best season in 2001, averaging 18.5 points per game en route to Most Improved Player and First Team All-WNBA honors.

Arcain's final WNBA game was played in Game 2 of the 2005 Western Conference Finals on September 10, 2005 against the Sacramento Monarchs. Arcain recorded 12 points, 2 rebounds, 2 assists and 4 steals but her team would lose the game 65 - 74 and be eliminated from the playoffs.

== National team career ==
With the Brazil national team, Arcain won the FIBA World Championship for Women in 1994 and two medals in the Olympic Games: silver in 1996, and bronze in 2000. Arcain also finished fourth in 2004, where she became the highest-scoring female player ever of the Olympics with 535 points, a record broken in 2012 by Lauren Jackson. She decided to retire after two big events to be hosted in Brazil, the 2006 FIBA World Championship for Women (fourth) and the 2007 Pan American Games (silver).

Arcain was named mayor of the 2016 Summer Olympics Olympic Village.

== Career statistics ==
Legend
GP	Games played	GS	Games started	MPG	Minutes per game	RPG	Rebounds per game
APG	Assists per game	SPG	Steals per game	BPG	Blocks per game	PPG	Points per game
TO	Turnovers per game	FG%	Field-goal percentage	3P%	3-point field-goal percentage	FT%	Free-throw percentage
**Bold**	Career best	°	League leader

†	Denotes seasons in which Arcain won a WNBA championship

=== WNBA ===
==== Regular season ====
Year	Team	GP	GS	MPG	FG%	3P%	FT%	RPG	APG	SPG	BPG	TO	PPG
1997†	Houston	28°	27	28.0	.440	.273	.894	3.9	1.6	1.5	.1	2.4	10.9
1998†	Houston	30°	4	21.9	.426	.152	.756	3.6	.9	.8	.1	1.3	6.8
1999†	Houston	32°	1	23.0	.433	.250	.829	2.8	1.2	.9	.1	**1.2**	5.8
2000†	Houston	32°	32°	30.5	**.468**	.200	.837	3.7	1.9	1.3	.1	1.7	8.4
2001	Houston	32°	32°	**36.1**	.426	**.333**	**.900**	**4.3**	**2.9**	**1.9**	.1	2.6	**18.5**
2002	Houston	32°	32°	34.9	.424	.270	.883	3.9	2.7	1.6	**.2**	2.2	11.4
2003	Houston	**34**°	**34**°	33.4	.466	.243	.840	4.0	2.0	1.2	.0	1.5	11.5
2005	Houston	**34**	**34**°	31.7	.421	.188	.883	2.7	1.6	1.6	**.2**	1.6	10.1
Career	8 years, 1 team	254	196	30.1	.437	.251	.867	3.6	1.8	1.4	.1	1.8	10.4

==== Playoffs ====
Year	Team	GP	GS	MPG	FG%	3P%	FT%	RPG	APG	SPG	BPG	TO	PPG
1997†	Houston	2	2	35.0	.333	**.333**	**1.000**	**7.5**	.5	.5	.0	.5	10.5
1998†	Houston	5	0	18.4	.444	.000	–	1.6	.8	.4	.2	.6	3.2
1999†	Houston	**6**	0	26.0	.448	.222	.625	3.0	1.0	1.0	.2	**.3**	6.3
2000†	Houston	**6**	**6**	33.5	.447	.286	.857	4.5	2.0	1.7	.0	2.7	8.3
2001	Houston	2	2	35.5	.382	.125	**1.000**	5.5	**2.5**	1.0	.0	2.5	**14.5**
2002	Houston	3	3	**39.7**	.429	.286	.875	3.7	1.3	1.7	**.3**	1.7	13.0
2003	Houston	3	3	35.7	.387	.200	.923	4.7	1.0	**2.7**	.0	2.3	12.3
2005	Houston	5	5	27.6	**.485**	.000	**1.000**	2.0	1.2	1.2	.0	.4	8.8
Career	8 years, 1 team	32	21	29.8	.421	.214	.850	3.6	1.3	1.3	.1	1.3	8.6
