= Tammy Jackson =

American basketball player (born 1962)

Personal information
- Born: December 3, 1962 (age 63) Gainesville, Florida, U.S.
- Listed height: 6 ft 3 in (1.91 m)
- Listed weight: 190 lb (86 kg)

Career information
- High school: Buchholz (Gainesville, Florida)
- College: Florida (1981–1985)
- WNBA draft: 1997: 2nd round, 16th overall pick
- Drafted by: Houston Comets
- Playing career: 1997–2002
- Position: Center
- Number: 23

Career history
- 1997–1998: Houston Comets
- 1998: Washington Mystics
- 1999–2002: Houston Comets

Career highlights
- 4× WNBA champion (1997–2000); 3× First-team All-SEC (1982–1984); University of Florida Athletic Hall of Fame
- Stats at Basketball Reference
Medals
Women's basketball
Representing the United States
Olympic Games
Bronze medal – third place	1992 Barcelona	Team competition
FIBA World Championship
Gold medal – first place	1990 Malaysia	Team competition

Tammy Eloise Jackson (born December 3, 1962) is an American former college and professional basketball player who was a center in the Women's National Basketball Association (WNBA) for six seasons in the 1990s and early 2000s. Jackson played college basketball for the University of Florida, and played professionally for the Houston Comets and Washington Mystics of the WNBA. She is an Olympic bronze medalist.

== Early years ==
Jackson grew up in Gainesville, Florida. She attended Buchholz High School in Gainesville, where she played high school basketball for the Buchholz Bobcats.

== College career ==
After graduating from high school, Jackson accepted an athletic scholarship to attend the University of Florida in Gainesville, where she played for the Florida Gators women's basketball team from 1982 to 1985. During her four years as a Gators, she scored 1,895 points, completed almost 56 percent of her shots from the floor, recovered 1,141 rebounds, and blocked 121 shots on defense. She was a three-time first-team All-Southeastern Conference (SEC) selection, and a senior team captain. She remains the third leading all-time scorer in Lady Gators basketball history.

Jackson was inducted into the University of Florida Athletic Hall of Fame as a "Gator Great" in 1995, and honored again as an "SEC Great" in 2003. Jackson graduated from the University of Florida with a bachelor's degree in health and human performance in 2007.

=== Florida statistics ===
Legend
GP	Games played	GS	Games started	MPG	Minutes per game
FG%	Field goal percentage	3P%	3-point field goal percentage	FT%	Free throw percentage
RPG	Rebounds per game	APG	Assists per game	SPG	Steals per game
BPG	Blocks per game	PPG	Points per game	**Bold**	Career high

Year	Team	GP	Points	FG%	FT%	RPG	APG	SPG	BPG	PPG
1981-82	Florida	25	474	**61.5%**	**67.7%**	11.6	0.4	1.7	0.8	19.0
1982-83	Florida	27	**560**	55.7%	53.0%	**12.7**	0.3	2.1	**0.8**	**20.7**
1983-84	Florida	28	414	56.9%	50.7%	8.4	1.2	1.1	0.5	14.8
1984-85	Florida	**31**	447	49.7%	52.4%	8.9	**1.6**	**2.8**	0.5	14.4
TOTALS	Florida	111	1895	55.7%	56.4%	10.3	0.9	1.9	0.2	17.1

== Professional career ==
After her college playing career was over, she played in various international leagues due to the lack of women's professional basketball leagues in the United States. Jackson was a member of the United States women's national basketball teams that won a world championship in 1990, and a bronze medal at the 1992 Summer Olympics.

When the WNBA began play in 1997, the Houston Comets picked Jackson in the second round (16th overall pick) of the 1997 WNBA draft. Her debut game was played on June 21, 1997 in a 76 - 56 win over the Cleveland Rockers where she recorded 5 points, 4 rebounds and 2 steals. Jackson was a member of the inaugural WNBA championship team when the Comets defeated the New York Liberty. After her rookie season, Jackson was drafted by the Mystics on February 18, 1998 in the 1998 expansion draft and played only two games for the team before being waived on June 23, 1998.

Jackson would be picked up by the Comets soon after and played her return game for them on June 29 (6 days after being waived by the Mystics). She would go on to win 3 more championships with the Comets, as the team won the 1998, 1999 and 2000 WNBA Finals. She continued as a player for the Comets for the 2001 and 2002 season, but only played 5 games in the 2002 season (with her first game not being until July 30, two weeks before the regular season ended). Her final WNBA game ever was played on August 13, 2002 in a 63 - 51 win over the Minnesota Lynx where she recorded 2 points, 3 rebounds and 2 steals.

Jackson ended her career as a 4x WNBA champion, playing a total of 143 career games (141 of them with the Comets) and averaging 2.8 points and 2.8 rebounds.

== WNBA Career statistics ==
Legend
GP	Games played	GS	Games started	MPG	Minutes per game	RPG	Rebounds per game
APG	Assists per game	SPG	Steals per game	BPG	Blocks per game	PPG	Points per game
TO	Turnovers per game	FG%	Field-goal percentage	3P%	3-point field-goal percentage	FT%	Free-throw percentage
**Bold**	Career best	°	League leader

=== Regular season ===
Year	Team	GP	GS	MPG	FG%	3P%	FT%	RPG	APG	SPG	BPG	TO	PPG
1997	Houston	28	3	**19.5**	40.9	0.0	61.0	**4.1**	0.4	**1.6**	0.4	1.8	**4.1**
1998	Washington	2	0	7.0	**66.7**	0.0	0.0	2.0	0.0	0.0	0.0	**0.0**	2.0
1998	Houston	19	0	8.4	38.1	0.0	**72.7**	1.1	0.3	0.2	0.3	0.7	1.3
1999	Houston	28	0	13.6	41.4	**100.0**	71.4	3.3	0.3	0.5	**0.7**	0.9	2.6
2000	Houston	29	1	11.7	57.4	0.0	54.5	2.1	0.4	0.4	0.3	0.8	2.6
2001	Houston	**32**	**4**	13.8	50.0	0.0	45.0	2.8	**0.7**	0.7	0.3	0.9	3.3
2002	Houston	5	1	13.8	37.5	0.0	0.0	2.6	0.2	0.6	0.6	1.2	1.2
Career	6 years, 2 teams	143	9	13.6	46.1	50.0	57.7	2.8	0.4	0.7	0.4	1.0	2.8

=== Playoffs ===
Year	Team	GP	GS	MPG	FG%	3P%	FT%	RPG	APG	SPG	BPG	TO	PPG
1997	Houston	2	**1**	**30.0**	**62.5**	0.0	66.7	**7.5**	0.0	**2.0**	0.5	**0.0**	**7.0**
1998	Houston	3	0	3.7	0.0	0.0	0.0	0.7	0.0	0.0	0.0	**0.0**	0.0
1999	Houston	**6**	0	19.2	54.2	0.0	**68.8**	7.0	**0.2**	1.2	**1.2**	1.2	6.2
2000	Houston	**6**	0	15.7	57.1	0.0	0.0	2.8	0.0	0.7	0.7	0.3	2.7
2001	Houston	1	0	15.0	0.0	0.0	66.7	3.0	0.0	1.0	1.0	1.0	4.0
Career	5 years, 1 team	18	1	16.4	53.1	0.0	67.9	4.4	0.1	0.9	0.7	0.6	3.9

== See also ==
- List of Florida Gators in the WNBA
- List of Olympic medalists in basketball
- List of University of Florida alumni
- List of University of Florida Athletic Hall of Fame members
- List of University of Florida Olympians
