= Nyree Roberts =

American basketball player (born 1976)

Personal information
- Born: March 10, 1976 (age 50) Orange, New Jersey, U.S.
- Listed height: 6 ft 3 in (1.91 m)

Career information
- High school: St. Anthony (Jersey City, New Jersey)
- College: Old Dominion (1994–1998)
- WNBA draft: 1998: 2nd round, 20th overall pick
- Drafted by: Houston Comets
- Position: Center

Career history
- 1998–1999: Houston Comets
- 1999: Washington Mystics

Career highlights
- WNBA Champion (1998); Third-team All-American – AP (1998); CAA Player of the Year (1998); CAA All-Defensive Team (1998); 2× First-team All-CAA (1997, 1998)
- Stats at Basketball Reference

Nyree Khadijah Roberts (born March 10, 1976) is an American professional women's basketball player.

She was raised in Jersey City, New Jersey, where she attended and played prep basketball at St. Anthony High School.

As a forward/center at Old Dominion University, Roberts was named to the Final Four All Tournament team in 1997.

Roberts played in the WNBA from 1998 to 1999 as a member of the Houston Comets and Washington Mystics. During the 2000 expansion draft on December 15, 1999, Roberts was selected by the Indiana Fever but ultimately never played for the Fever.

== Career statistics ==
Legend
GP	Games played	GS	Games started	MPG	Minutes per game	RPG	Rebounds per game
APG	Assists per game	SPG	Steals per game	BPG	Blocks per game	PPG	Points per game
TO	Turnovers per game	FG%	Field-goal percentage	3P%	3-point field-goal percentage	FT%	Free-throw percentage
**Bold**	Career best	°	League leader

=== WNBA ===
Year	Team	GP	GS	MPG	FG%	3P%	FT%	RPG	APG	SPG	BPG	TO	PPG
1998	Houston	**14**	0	3.9	**85.7**	0.0	**57.1**	0.7	**0.1**	0.1	0.0	**0.3**	1.1
1999	Houston	4	0	4.3	0.0	0.0	50.0	0.5	0.0	0.0	0.0	**0.3**	0.3
1999	Washington	8	0	**7.8**	60.0	0.0	**57.1**	**1.3**	**0.1**	**0.6**	**0.1**	1.3	**2.0**
**Career**	2 years, 2 teams	26	0	5.2	66.7	0.0	56.3	0.8	0.1	0.2	0.0	0.6	1.3

=== College ===
College statistics
Year	Team	GP	Points	FG%	FT%	RPG	APG	BPG	PPG
1994–95	Old Dominion University	33	266	53.8%	40.9%	5.2	0.5	0.7	8.1
1995–96	Old Dominion University	32	329	58.7%	55.6%	4.5	0.8	1.7	10.3
1996–97	Old Dominion University	**36**	613	**65.2%**	54.7%	8.0	0.8	2.1	17.0
1997–98	Old Dominion University	32	**646**	63.2%	51.3%	**12.0**	**0.9**	2.0	**20.2**
**Career**		133	1854	61.5%	51.0%	74.0	0.8	0.5	13.9
