= Fran Harris =

American basketball player and TV personality (born 1965)

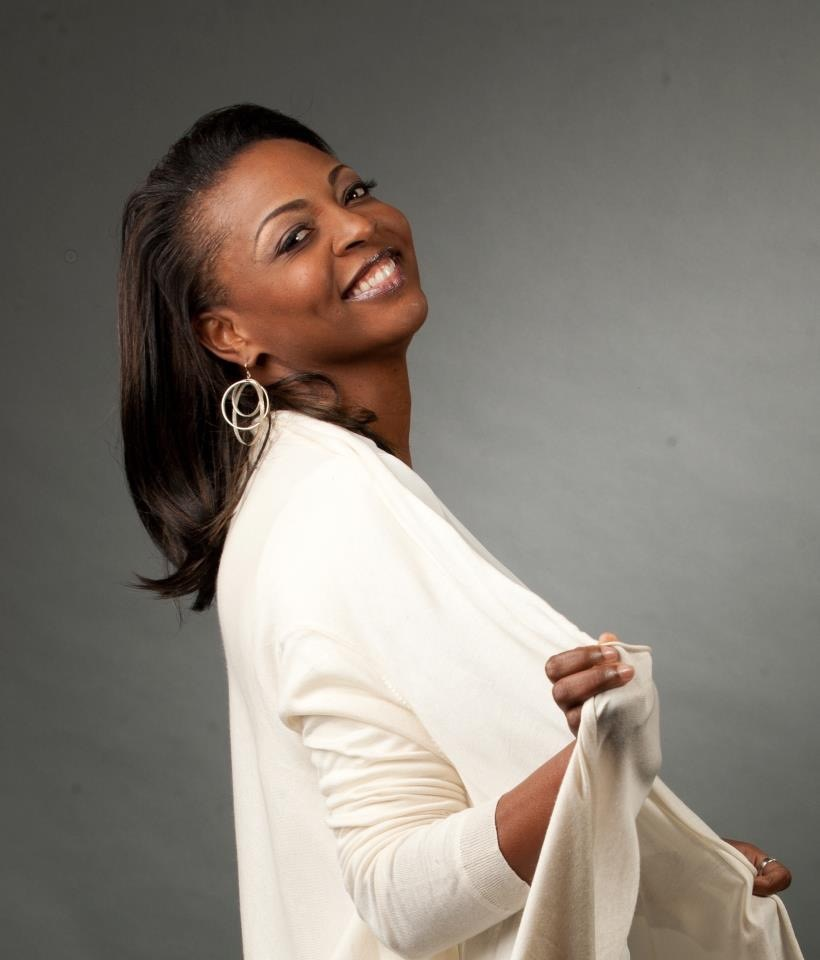

Personal information
- Born: March 12, 1965 (age 61) Dallas, Texas, U.S.
- Listed height: 6 ft 0 in (1.83 m)

Career information
- High school: South Oak Cliff (Dallas, Texas)
- College: Texas (1982–1986)
- WNBA draft: 1997: undrafted
- Playing career: 1997–1998
- Position: Guard
- Number: 20

Career history
- 1997: Houston Comets
- 1998: Utah Starzz

Career highlights
- WNBA champion (1997); NCAA champion (1986)
- Stats at Basketball Reference
Medals
Women's Basketball
Representing United States
Pan American
Gold medal – first place	1987 Indianapolis	Team
Jones Cup
Gold medal – first place	1985 Taipei	Team competition
FIBA World Championship for Women
Gold medal – first place	1986 Moscow	Team competition

Fran Harris (born March 12, 1965) is an American television personality, sportscaster, and former professional and college basketball player who has won championships in high school, in college, and in the Women's National Basketball Association (WNBA).

After not playing competitively for nearly 8 years, she beat out more than 200 athletes to earn a spot in the inaugural season of the WNBA for the Houston Comets. Harris played basketball at The University of Texas, where she captained the team that won the 1986 national championship and led the team to the first ever NCAA undefeated season going 34–0. In 2010, Harris was the host of Home Rules, a transformational television series on HGTV. She's currently an announcer for the ESPN family of networks, serial entrepreneur and author who's appeared on The Today Show, Good Morning America, CNBC, CNN, Oprah’s Radio Network, NPR, The Tavis Smiley Show and numerous other television and radio networks.

== Early life and education ==
Born in Dallas, Texas, Fran Harris is the fourth of five children; she has three brothers and a sister. She started playing basketball when she was a sophomore at South Oak Cliff High School and played on the on JV and varsity teams her first year. She then helped the team to a 40–0 season and State Championship. She moved on to the University of Texas at Austin where she had a standout basketball career and earned bachelor's degrees and master's degrees in journalism.

== Basketball career ==
Harris was a player for The University of Texas at Austin from 1982 to 1986. She led her team to its first and only NCAA Championship title, to date in 1986 with the first perfect season in women's NCAA history. The team went 34–0. Harris was the leading scorer three years in a row and was the team captain in 1986. She was named to the Southwest Conference All-Decade Team, SWC Player of the Year and was two-time team MVP, selected by teammates. Harris was an outside shooter who finished her career as the University's fourth all-time leading scorer with 1,798 points.

Harris played for USA Basketball as part of the 1985 USA National Jones Cup Team that captured Gold for the second year in a row, World Championship Team in 1986 that won Gold, USA Women's Pan American Team in 1987 that won a gold medal in Indianapolis, Indiana and was an Olympic Team Alternate in 1988.

After college, Harris went to play professional basketball in Italy and Switzerland. She later played for two years in the WNBA. In the league's inaugural season, she was a member of the Houston Comets. She started one game for the Comets but played in 25 games coming off the bench, scoring a total of 104 points on the season as the Comets won the first-ever WNBA Championship. The next season, she was a starter for the Utah Starzz. At the end of the season she was waived from the team's roster, and chose to retire and begin her career in broadcasting with TV partner, Lifetime.

Since 2024, Harris has been the primary color commentator and basketball analyst for Dallas Wings local television broadcasts, paired with play-by-play announcer Ron Thulin.

== Other career activities ==
Harris hosted the transformational makeover show, Home Rules on HGTV, in which Harris helped redesign the interiors of people's homes.

Harris has been coaching since she was a teenager and has been a fitness advocate since college. Since retiring from the WNBA, Harris has appeared as a fitness and life coach on many television shows. She produced and hosted her own reality show, America's Fitness Show, which aired in Austin, Texas.

In 2011, Harris bested over 15,000 candidates to be named Good Morning America's Advice Guru Runner-up. That same year, Harris was one of eleven contestants appearing on the NBC competitive reality television series America's Next Great Restaurant, in which aspiring restaurateurs pitch their concepts for a fast casual restaurant chain.

In 2021, Harris appeared on ABC's Shark Tank to pitch her sports drink "Electra."

== Career statistics ==
Legend
GP	Games played	GS	Games started	MPG	Minutes per game	RPG	Rebounds per game
APG	Assists per game	SPG	Steals per game	BPG	Blocks per game	PPG	Points per game
TO	Turnovers per game	FG%	Field-goal percentage	3P%	3-point field-goal percentage	FT%	Free-throw percentage
**Bold**	Career best	°	League leader

Year	Team	GP	GS	MPG	FG%	3P%	FT%	RPG	APG	SPG	BPG	TO	PPG
1997^{†}	Houston	**25**	1	14.8	.346	**.333**	.710	**2.2**	1.0	**0.7**	**0.1**	1.2	**4.2**
1998	Utah	18	**12**	**19.6**	**.354**	.313	**.833**	**2.2**	**1.7**	**0.7**	**0.1**	**0.9**	3.9
Career	2 years, 2 teams	43	13	16.8	.349	.325	.744	2.2	1.3	0.7	0.1	1.1	4.1
