= Monica Lamb-Powell =

American basketball player (born 1964)

Personal information
- Born: October 11, 1964 (age 62) Houston, Texas
- Listed height: 6 ft 5 in (1.96 m)
- Listed weight: 206 lb (93 kg)

Career information
- High school: Yates (Houston, Texas)
- College: Houston (1983–1985); USC (1986–1987)
- WNBA draft: 1998: 4th round, 40th overall pick
- Drafted by: Houston Comets
- Position: Center
- Number: 40

Career history
- 1998–2000: Houston Comets

Career highlights
- 3x WNBA Champion (1998–2000); Second-team All Pac-10 (1987)
- Stats at Basketball Reference
Medals
Representing United States
Women's basketball
World University Games
Gold medal – first place	1983 Edmonton	Team competition

Monica Lamb-Powell or Monica Lamb (born October 11, 1964) is an American former basketball player. She played for the Houston Comets in the WNBA and US National Teams. She is now the founder and president of the Monica Lamb Wellness Foundation.

Lamb played on the 1983 World University games team, coached by Jill Hutchison. She helped the team win the gold medal for the USA team.

Lamb was selected to be a member of the team representing the US at the 1987 World University Games held in Zagreb, Yugoslavia. The USA team won four of the five contests. In the opening game against Poland, Lamb was the second leading scorer for the US with 16 points. After winning their next game against Finland, the USA faced the host team Yugoslavia. The game went to overtime, but Yugoslavia prevailed, 93–89. The USA faced China in the next game. They won 84–83, but they needed to win by at least five points to remain in medal contention. They won the final game against Canada to secure fifth place. Lamb averaged 11.4 points per games, tied for first on the team. She averaged 4.6 rebounds per game, second most on the team.

== Career statistics ==
=== WNBA ===
Legend
GP	Games played	GS	Games started	MPG	Minutes per game	RPG	Rebounds per game
APG	Assists per game	SPG	Steals per game	BPG	Blocks per game	PPG	Points per game
TO	Turnovers per game	FG%	Field-goal percentage	3P%	3-point field-goal percentage	FT%	Free-throw percentage
**Bold**	Career best	°	League leader

==== Regular season ====
Year	Team	GP	GS	MPG	FG%	3P%	FT%	RPG	APG	SPG	BPG	TO	PPG
1998	Houston	**30**	**25**	**21.6**	**54.1**	54.1	69.0	**4.7**	**0.3**	**0.8**	**0.7**	0.9	**5.4**
1999	Houston	3	0	12.0	40.0	40.0	**83.3**	2.0	0.0	0.0	**0.7**	**0.3**	4.3
2000	Houston	13	2	10.8	50.0	0.0	50.0	2.0	0.2	0.2	0.3	**0.3**	2.0
Career	3 years, 1 team	46	27	17.9	52.6	0.0	66.7	3.8	0.3	0.6	0.6	0.7	4.3

==== Playoffs ====
Year	Team	GP	GS	MPG	FG%	3P%	FT%	RPG	APG	SPG	BPG	TO	PPG
1998	Houston	5	5	21.4	56.0	0.0	50.0	3.6	0.0	0.4	0.8	1.6	5.8
Career	1 year, 1 team	5	5	21.4	56.0	0.0	50.0	3.6	0.0	0.4	0.8	1.6	5.8

=== College ===
Ratios
Year	Team	GP	FG%	FT%	RBG	PPG
1983–84	Houston	28	57.7%	60.6%	7.93	13.93
1984–85	Houston	**30**	**66.3%**	51.5%	**9.80**	16.93
1986–87	USC	**30**	48.3%	**61.2%**	8.07	**17.03**
Career		88	59.3%	57.8%	8.61	16.01

Totals
Year	Team	GP	FG	FGA	FT	FTA	REB	PTS
1983–84	Houston	28	162	281	**66**	**109**	222	390
1984–85	Houston	**30**	**228**	**344**	52	101	**294**	508
1986–87	USC	**30**	83	172	63	103	242	**511**
Career		88	473	797	181	313	758	1409
