= Kim Perrot =

American basketball player (1967–1999)

Personal information
- Born: January 18, 1967 Lafayette, Louisiana, U.S.
- Died: August 19, 1999 (aged 32) Houston, Texas, U.S.
- Listed height: 5 ft 5 in (1.65 m)
- Listed weight: 132 lb (60 kg)

Career information
- High school: Acadiana (Scott, Louisiana)
- College: Louisiana (1986–1990)
- WNBA draft: 1997: undrafted
- Playing career: 1997–1999
- Position: Point guard
- Number: 10

Career history
- 1997–1999: Houston Comets

Career highlights
- 2× WNBA champion (1997–1998); No. 10 retired by Houston Comets; No. 12 retired by Louisiana Ragin' Cajuns; NCAA season scoring leader (1990)
- Stats at Basketball Reference

Kim Perrot (January 18, 1967 – August 19, 1999) was an American basketball player. She played in the WNBA for the Houston Comets, winning two championships with the team. Perrot died from cancer before the 1999 WNBA season. Her #10 was posthumously retired by the Comets.

== College ==
Perrot attended the University of Southwestern Louisiana (now the University of Louisiana at Lafayette) and played four years there as a guard. In one game against the University of Southeastern Louisiana, she scored 58 points, the third most in NCAA history.

== Southwestern Louisiana statistics ==
Legend
GP	Games played	GS	Games started	MPG	Minutes per game	FG%	Field goal percentage	3P%	3-point field goal percentage
FT%	Free throw percentage	RPG	Rebounds per game	APG	Assists per game	SPG	Steals per game	BPG	Blocks per game
TO	Turnovers per game	PPG	Points per game	**Bold**	Career high	*	Led Division I

Year	Team	GP	Points	FG%	3P%	FT%	RPG	APG	SPG	BPG	PPG
1987	Southwestern Louisiana	27	354	36.9%	NA	55.1%	4.0	**7.1**	NA	NA	13.1
1988	Southwestern Louisiana	**29**	501	38.6%	32.3%	47.5%	4.7	5.4	3.0	0.0	17.3
1989	Southwestern Louisiana	26	448	41.9%	**37.3%**	62.0%	5.7	6.0	4.1	**0.3**	17.2
1990	Southwestern Louisiana	28	**839**	**42.2%**	36.0%	**66.7%**	**5.8**	5.6	**5.1**	0.0	***30.0**
Career		110	2142	40.3%	34.9%	59.4%	5.0	6.0	3.1	0.1	19.5

== WNBA ==
After playing six seasons in Europe, Perrot joined the WNBA in the summer of 1997 for its inaugural season. Perrot played point guard for the Houston Comets and her debut game was played on June 21, 1997. On that day, the Comets defeated the Cleveland Rockers 76 - 56 with Perrot recording 2 points, 3 rebounds, 3 assists and 3 steals.

At 5 ft 5 in (1.65 m), she was noted there for her ferocious play and was a crowd favorite. Her best friend was Comets star Cynthia Cooper.

Perrot was the starting point guard for the Comets for 24 of the team's 28 games (for the other 4 games, teammate Tiffany Woosley would start in Perrot's place) and would go on to average 5.8 points, 2.7 rebounds, 3.1 assists and 2.5 steals per game for the season. The Comets finished with an 18 - 10 record and made it to the WNBA Finals where they defeated the New York Liberty to win the WNBA's first championship.

Perrot would remain the Comets' starting point guard for the 1998 season and started in all 30 of the team's regular season games. Perrot played more minutes in her sophomore season and had increased productivity across the board, averaging 8.5 points, 3.1 rebounds, 4.7 assists and 2.8 steals per game. The Comets finished with an incredible 27 - 3 record and once again won the WNBA championship by defeating the Phoenix Mercury in a best-of-3 series.

After the 1998 season, Perrot would not play in the WNBA again as she was diagnosed with lung cancer in February 1999.

Perrot wore jersey number 10 with the Comets organization and averaged 7.2 points, 3.3 steals, and 2.9 rebounds per game during her two seasons with the team.

Her final game was Game 3 of the 1998 WNBA Finals on September 1, 1998, where she recorded 13 points, 5 rebounds and 4 assists to help Houston defeat Phoenix 80 - 71.

== Death and legacy ==
Perrot succumbed to her illness on August 19, 1999. The cancer had metastasized to Perrot's brain. She underwent surgery and radiation treatments to eradicate the tumors in her head, but declined chemotherapy recommended by her doctors. Perrot went to Mexico to seek alternative methods to battle cancer. In Mexico, she was joined by Cooper. Two days before her death, she took a Medevac flight back to Houston from Tijuana, with Cooper and members of the Perrot family flying along. She was the first active player in the WNBA to die.

After her death, the Comets went on to win a third straight WNBA title in 1999, and a tearful Cooper celebrated what the team called "#3 for #10". She was posthumously awarded a third championship ring and her #10 jersey was retired, thus making her the first player in league history to have her number retired. The WNBA subsequently renamed their sportsmanship award the Kim Perrot Sportsmanship Award in her honor.

Comets fans raised money to create "Kim's Place", an area at the MD Anderson Cancer Center in Houston where kids with cancer can play games, sports, and relax. Also, the "Kim Perrot Leadership Award" was created by the Houston Can! Academy (a charter school for at risk youth). While ill with cancer, Perrot had made many public appearances and given motivational speeches, mostly at schools.

Perrot is buried at the Our Lady of the Assumption Cemetery in Carencro, Louisiana.

== Career statistics ==
Legend
GP	Games played	GS	Games started	MPG	Minutes per game	RPG	Rebounds per game
APG	Assists per game	SPG	Steals per game	BPG	Blocks per game	PPG	Points per game
TO	Turnovers per game	FG%	Field-goal percentage	3P%	3-point field-goal percentage	FT%	Free-throw percentage
**Bold**	Career best	°	League leader

=== Regular season ===
Year	Team	GP	GS	MPG	FG%	3P%	FT%	RPG	APG	SPG	BPG	TO	PPG
1997^{†}	Houston	28	24	24.7	.364	**.283**	.405	2.7	3.1	2.5	**0.1**	**2.3**	5.8
1998^{†}	Houston	**30**	**30**	**32.9**	**.404**	.269	**.700**	**3.1**	**4.7**	**2.8**	0.0	2.7	**8.5**
Career	2 years, 1 team	58	54	28.9	.387	.275	.598	2.9	4.0	2.6	0.0	2.5	7.2

=== Playoffs ===
Year	Team	GP	GS	MPG	FG%	3P%	FT%	RPG	APG	SPG	BPG	TO	PPG
1997^{†}	Houston	2	2	**38.0**	.227	.214	**.750**	**4.5**	2.0	**3.0**	0.0	4.5	8.0
1998^{†}	Houston	**5**	**5**	36.4	**.375**	**.375**	.417	3.2	**5.0**	1.6	0.0	**3.4**	**8.2**
Career	2 years, 1 team	7	7	36.9	.323	.300	.500	3.6	4.1	2.0	0.0	3.7	8.1

== See also ==
- List of basketball players who died during their careers
- List of notable brain tumor patients
