= Yolanda Moore =

American basketball player and coach (born 1974)

Personal information
- Born: July 1, 1974 (age 52) Port Gibson, Mississippi, U.S.
- Listed height: 6 ft 0 in (1.83 m)
- Listed weight: 175 lb (79 kg)

Career information
- High school: Port Gibson (Port Gibson, Mississippi)
- College: Ole Miss (1992–1996)
- WNBA draft: 1999: Expansion round, 6th
- Drafted by: Orlando Miracle
- Playing career: 1997–2001
- Position: Guard
- Coaching career: 2007–present

Career history

Playing
- 1997–1998: Houston Comets
- 1999: Orlando Miracle

Coaching
- 2007–2008: DeSoto Central HS (boys' asst.)
- 2011: Heritage Academy
- 2013–2014: LSU Eunice
- 2014–2016: Southeastern Louisiana
- 2017–2019: Clark Atlanta

Career highlights
- 2× WNBA champion (1997, 1998); 2× First-team All-SEC; Mississippi Miss Basketball (1992)
- Stats at Basketball Reference

Yolanda Moore (born July 1, 1974) is an American former professional basketball player. She was the post game radio analyst for the Memphis Grizzlies in 2007.

== College playing career ==
Moore played basketball at University of Mississippi and was a three-time All-Southeastern Conference post player. In 2010, she was inducted into Ole Miss Sports Hall of Fame. She graduated from Mississippi in 1997 with a bachelor's degree with a double major in English and radio and television.

== WNBA ==
Moore played her first two years in the WNBA with the Houston Comets. Her debut game was played on July 9, 1997 in a 64 - 69 loss to the Phoenix Mercury where she recorded 2 points and 1 rebound. She only played in 13 of the Comets' 28 games of the season as the team finished 18 - 10. She did compete in the Comets' WNBA Finals game against the New York Liberty and won a championship ring.

The 1998 season saw an improvement for Moore and the Comets as a whole. Moore had increased productivity across the board going from 7.2 mpg to 17.8 mpg, 1.2 ppg to 3.3 ppg and 1 rpg to 2.9 rpg. The Comets finished with a 27 - 3 record and again won the WNBA Finals, defeating the Phoenix Mercury in a best-of-three series.

During the 1999 expansion draft on April 6, 1999, Moore was selected by the Orlando Miracle. In Moore's first game with the Miracle on June 10, 1999, she conveniently lost to the Comets (her previous team) 63 - 77 while recording 2 points and 1 rebound. The Miracle finished 15 - 17 and Moore missed the playoffs for the first time in her career.

After the 1999 season, Moore was drafted by the Miami Sol in another 2000 expansion draft that took place on December 15, 1999. However, Moore never played a game for the Sol and her final WNBA game ever was her final game with the Miracle. That game took place on August 18, 1999 where the Miracle defeated the Detroit Shock 93-81 with Moore recording 4 points, 1 rebound and 1 assist.

Moore finished her WNBA career as a 2-time champion, playing a total of 66 games and averaged 2.1 points and 1.7 rebound per game.

== Coaching career ==
Moore became assistant boys' basketball coach and honors English teacher at DeSoto Central High School in Southaven, Mississippi near Memphis, Tennessee in 2007. In 2011, she was girls' basketball coach at Heritage Academy in Columbus, Mississippi before being fired in December.

=== Louisiana State University at Eunice ===
Moore led the Lady Bengals to a 26-3 overall record. The team ranked sixth nationally in scoring defense.

=== Southeastern Louisiana University ===
In April 2014 Moore became the fifth head women's basketball coach for Southeastern Louisiana University. She continued in that role for two seasons, in which she had an 11–47 record.

== Personal life ==
Moore has four children; she had her first child while attending the University of Mississippi. In addition to her undergraduate degree at Mississippi, Moore has a master's degree in workforce educational leadership from Alcorn State University and later enrolled at Mississippi State University to pursue a Ph.D. in instructional systems and workforce development.

== Career statistics ==
Legend
| GP | Games played | GS | Games started | MPG | Minutes per game | RPG | Rebounds per game |
| APG | Assists per game | SPG | Steals per game | BPG | Blocks per game | PPG | Points per game |
| TO | Turnovers per game | FG% | Field-goal percentage | 3P% | 3-point field-goal percentage | FT% | Free-throw percentage |
| **Bold** | Career best | ° | League leader |

=== Regular season ===
| Year | Team | GP | GS | MPG | FG% | 3P% | FT% | RPG | APG | SPG | BPG | TO | PPG |
|---|---|---|---|---|---|---|---|---|---|---|---|---|---|
| 1997^{†} | Houston | 13 | 0 | 7.2 | .250 | — | .500 | 1.0 | 0.1 | 0.1 | 0.0 | **0.5** | 1.2 |
| 1998^{†} | Houston | **30** | **4** | **17.8** | .451 | **.500** | **.805** | **2.9** | **0.3** | **0.9** | 0.0 | 0.7 | **3.3** |
| 1999 | Orlando | 23 | 0 | 5.0 | **.476** | .000 | .500 | 0.6 | 0.0 | 0.2 | 0.0 | 0.6 | 1.1 |
| Career | 3 years, 2 teams | 66 | 4 | 11.2 | .420 | .333 | .692 | 1.7 | 0.2 | 0.5 | 0.0 | 0.6 | 2.1 |

=== Playoffs ===
| Year | Team | GP | GS | MPG | FG% | 3P% | FT% | RPG | APG | SPG | BPG | TO | PPG |
|---|---|---|---|---|---|---|---|---|---|---|---|---|---|
| 1997^{†} | Houston | 1 | 0 | 3.0 | — | — | — | 0.0 | 0.0 | 0.0 | 0.0 | **0.0** | 0.0 |
| 1998^{†} | Houston | **5** | 0 | **12.2** | **.667** | — | **.333** | **1.8** | 0.0 | **0.8** | 0.0 | 0.2 | **4.2** |
| Career | 2 years, 1 team | 6 | 0 | 10.7 | .667 | — | .333 | 1.5 | 0.0 | 0.7 | 0.0 | 0.2 | 3.5 |

== Head coaching record ==
=== Junior college ===
Record table
| Season | Team | Overall | Conference | Standing | Postseason |
|---|---|---|---|---|---|
LSU Eunice Bengals (MISS-LOU Junior College Conference) (2013–2014)
| 2013–14 | LSU Eunice | 26–4 | 7–2 | 1st | NJCAA Regional |
| Total: | | 26–4 | | | |
National champion Postseason invitational champion Conference regular season champion Conference regular season and conference tournament champion Division regular season champion Division regular season and conference tournament champion Conference tournament champion

=== College ===
Record table
| Season | Team | Overall | Conference | Standing | Postseason |
|---|---|---|---|---|---|
Southeastern Louisiana Lions (Southland Conference) (2014–2016)
| 2014–15 | Southeastern Louisiana | 7–22 | 3–15 | 12th | |
| 2015–16 | Southeastern Louisiana | 4–25 | 3–15 | T–12th | |
| Southeastern Louisiana: | | 11–47 | 6–30 | | |
| Total: | | 11–47 | | | |
