= Tina Thompson =

American basketball player (born 1975)

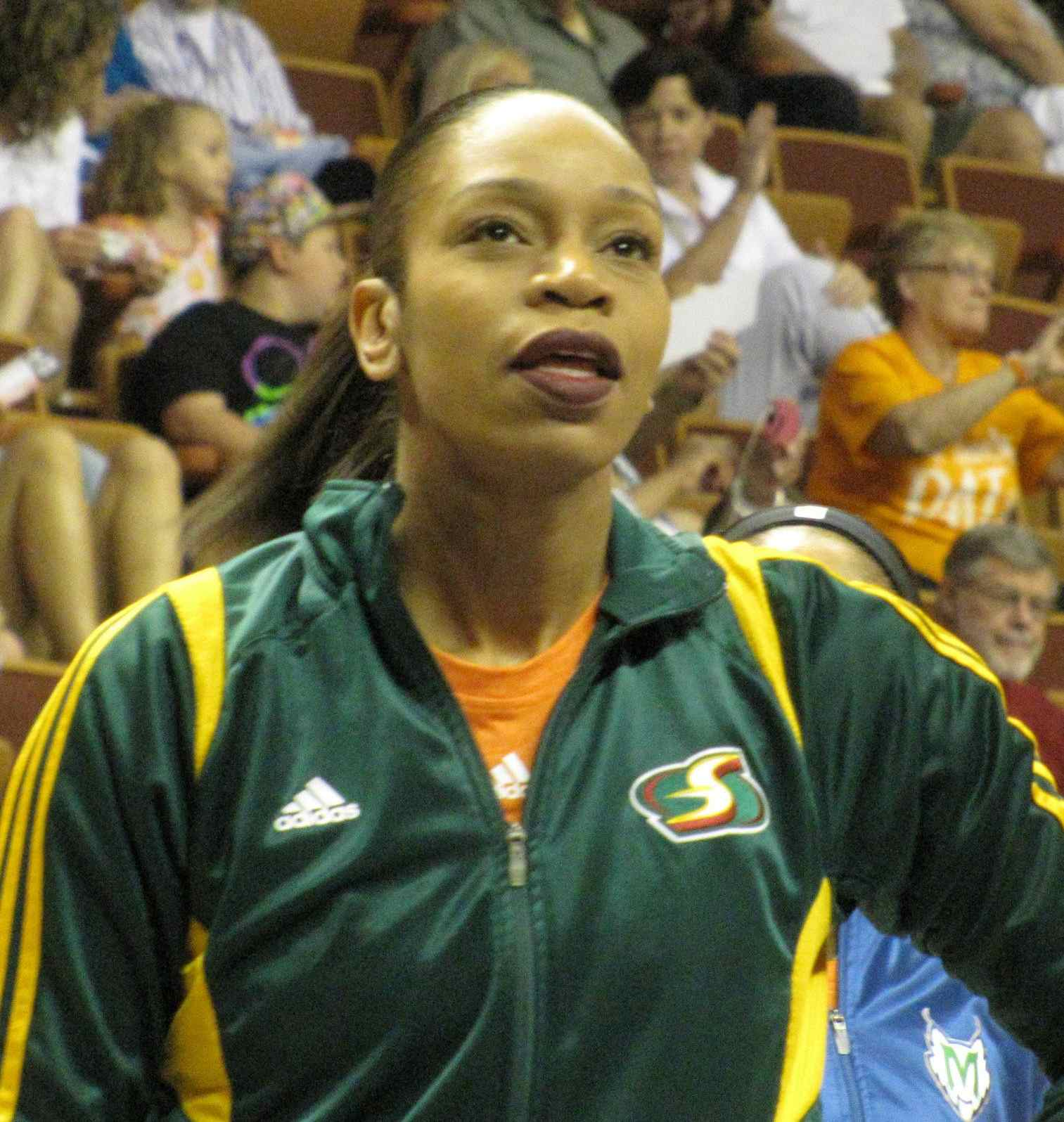
- Thompson at the 2013 WNBA All-Star Game

Personal information
- Born: February 10, 1975 (age 51) Los Angeles, California, U.S.
- Listed height: 6 ft 2 in (1.88 m)
- Listed weight: 178 lb (81 kg)

Career information
- High school: Morningside (Inglewood, California)
- College: USC (1993–1997)
- WNBA draft: 1997: 1st round, 1st overall pick
- Drafted by: Houston Comets
- Playing career: 1997–2014
- Position: Small forward / power forward
- Number: 7, 32
- Coaching career: 2015–present

Career history

Playing
- 1997–2008: Houston Comets
- 2001–2002: Rovereto Basket
- 2003: Incheon Kumho Life Falcons
- 2005–2006: Cheonan Kookmin Bank Savers
- 2006–2007: Spartak Moscow Region
- 2009–2011: Los Angeles Sparks
- 2010: Municipal MCM Târgovişte
- 2010: Chuncheon Woori Bank Hansae
- 2012–2013: Seattle Storm
- 2013–2014: Guri KDB Life Winnus

Career highlights
- 4× WNBA champion (1997–2000); 9× WNBA All-Star (1999–2003, 2006, 2007, 2009, 2013); WNBA All-Star Game MVP (2000); 3× All-WNBA First Team (1997, 1998, 2004); 5× All-WNBA Second Team (1999–2002, 2007); WNBA anniversary teams (10th, 15th, 20th, 25th); Russian National League champion (2007); EuroLeague champion (2007); Romanian National League champion (2010); Second-team All-American – AP (1997); All-American – USBWA (1997); 3× All-Pac-10 (1995-1997); No. 14 retired by USC
- Stats at WNBA.com
- Stats at Basketball Reference
- Basketball Hall of Fame
- Women's Basketball Hall of Fame
Medals
Women's basketball
Representing United States
Olympic Games
Gold medal – first place	2004 Athens	Team competition
Gold medal – first place	2008 Beijing	Team competition
World Cup
Gold medal – first place	1998 Germany	Team competition
Bronze medal – third place	2006 Brazil	Team competition
Universiade
Silver medal – second place	1995 Fukuoka	Team competition
Jones Cup
Gold medal – first place	1996	Team competition

Tina Marie Thompson (born February 10, 1975) is an American former professional basketball player and coach. Most recently, she served as the head coach of the Virginia Cavaliers women's basketball team from 2018 to 2022; she was subsequently hired by the Portland Trail Blazers as a team scout later in 2022. Thompson was inducted into both the Women's Basketball Hall of Fame and the Naismith Memorial Basketball Hall of Fame in 2018.

The first college draft pick in WNBA history, Thompson was selected first by the Houston Comets. She helped lead the Comets to four consecutive WNBA Championships in 1997, 1998, 1999, and 2000. She won two Olympic gold medals and made nine WNBA All-Star Game appearances. Until 2017, she was the WNBA's all-time leading scorer and, as of 2026, she ranks fourth in WNBA history.

== Early life and college ==
Thompson was born in Los Angeles, California. She grew up playing basketball with her brother TJ and his friends at Robertson Park in West Los Angeles, California. She recorded more than 1,500 points and 1,000 rebounds in her high school career at Morningside High School in Inglewood, California, where she also played volleyball. She then went on to play basketball at the University of Southern California, where she graduated in 1997. She attended both high school and college with fellow WNBA player Lisa Leslie.

=== USC statistics ===
Legend
GP	Games played	GS	Games started	MPG	Minutes per game
FG%	Field goal percentage	3P%	3-point field goal percentage	FT%	Free throw percentage
RPG	Rebounds per game	APG	Assists per game	SPG	Steals per game
BPG	Blocks per game	PPG	Points per game	**Bold**	Career high

Year	Team	GP	Points	FG%	3P%	FT%	RPG	APG	SPG	BPG	PPG
1993-94	USC	**30**	427	49.9%	**35.7%**	64.1%	10.5	0.8	1.3	0.7	14.2
1994-95	USC	28	545	**51.9%**	20.6%	73.1%	10.5	0.9	1.3	0.9	19.5
1995-96	USC	27	623	50.7%	31.6%	74.2%	9.3	1.6	1.4	**1.1**	**23.1**
1996-97	USC	29	**653**	49.9%	33.9%	**78.1%**	**10.6**	**2.0**	**1.9**	1.0	22.5
Career		114	2248	50.6%	31.7%	73.1%	10.2	1.3	1.5	0.9	19.7

== USA Basketball ==
Thompson represented the US at the 1995 World University Games held in Fukuoka, Japan, in August and September 1995. The team had a record of 5–1, securing the silver medal. The USA team won early and reached a record of 5–0 when the USA beat Yugoslavia. In the semi-final game, the USA faced Russia. The team was behind much of the first half but tied the game at the half. The USA broke the game open in the second half and won, 101–74. The gold medal match was against unbeaten Italy. The Italian team started strong, scoring 12 of the first 14 points of the contest. Sylvia Crawley scored eight consecutive points to end the first half, but that left the USA nine points behind. The USA took a small lead in the second half, but the team from Italy responded with a ten-point run, and won the game and the gold medal by a score of 73–65. Thompson averaged 9.9 points per game and was second on the team with 7.3 rebounds per game.

Thompson was invited to be a member of the Jones Cup team representing the US in 1996. She helped the team to a 9–0 record, and the gold medal in the event. In the game against Slovakia, which would determine the gold medal, she combined with teammate Michelle M. Marciniak to score 30 points in a game they had to come from behind to win 72–62. Thompson averaged 9.6 points per game and 6.2 rebounds, both second highest on the team.

Thompson was selected to be a member of the National team for 1998 World Championships, but was injured and unable to compete.

Thompson was named to the national team representing the US at the 2006 World Championships, held in Barueri and Sao Paulo, Brazil. The team won eight of their nine contests, but the lone loss came in the semifinal medal round to Russia. The USA beat Brazil in the final game to earn the bronze medal. Thompson led all scorers with 14.4 points per game. In a game against Russia, she tied a team record by hitting four of four three-point attempts.

Thompson also played for Team USA in the 2004 and 2008 Summer Olympics, winning two Olympic gold medals with the team.

== WNBA career ==
Thompson was selected No. 1 overall in the first round of the inaugural 1997 WNBA draft by the Houston Comets. Her debut game was played on June 21, 1997 in a 76–56 victory over the Cleveland Rockers. In her debut, Thompson recorded 14 points, 5 rebounds and 4 blocks.

On the Comets, she was a member of a dynasty along with Sheryl Swoopes and Cynthia Cooper that won four consecutive WNBA championships from 1997 to 2000. During her stint with the Comets, Thompson had won All-Star MVP honors at the 2000 WNBA All-Star Game, led all Western Conference players in All-Star voting in 2001, had been named to the All-WNBA First Team three times (1997, 1998, 2004) and All-WNBA Second Team four times (1999, 2000, 2001, 2002).

Prior to the 2005 season, Thompson had given birth to Dyllan Thompson-Jones, her first child in May, with then NBA player Damon Jones being the biological father; she resumed playing with the Comets two months later. Following her pregnancy she had a sluggish season in 2005, averaging only 10.1 ppg.

In 2006, Thompson returned to peak condition, averaging 18.7 ppg and scored a career-high 37 points in a triple-overtime loss to the Phoenix Mercury. That year the Comets made the playoffs for the final time before folding, after they were eliminated in a two-game sweep by the Sacramento Monarchs in the first round.

After the Comets folded in 2008, Thompson signed with her hometown team, the Los Angeles Sparks in 2009, playing alongside Candace Parker and Lisa Leslie who was playing in her final year before retirement. Thompson, Leslie and Parker led the Sparks to the playoffs with an 18–16 record. In the playoffs, Thompson was one win away from her fifth Finals appearance but the Sparks lost 2–1 in the second round to the Phoenix Mercury, who were the champions that year. During the following season in August, Thompson became the WNBA's all-time leading scorer, passing Lisa Leslie during a regular-season game loss to the San Antonio Silver Stars in which she scored 23 points. In 2011, she was voted in by fans as one of the top 15 players in the fifteen-year history of the WNBA.

An unrestricted free agent at the end of the 2011 season, Thompson signed with the Seattle Storm on February 27, 2012, to fill gaps left by Australia's Lauren Jackson, concurrent her commitment to the Australian national team for the 2012 Olympics, and small forward Swin Cash, who was traded to the Chicago Sky as part of a package deal for the second-overall pick in the 2012 WNBA draft.

On May 31, 2013, Thompson announced that she would retire from the WNBA at the end of the 2013 season.

During the 2013 season, the 38-year-old Thompson was a starter for the Storm and had averaged 14.1 ppg. She was also selected to the 2013 WNBA All-Star Game to replace an injured Brittney Griner. It was her ninth career WNBA All-Star Game appearance, the second-most in WNBA history, and it also made her the first and only player in WNBA history to be named an All-Star in three different decades.

On August 17, 2013, Thompson became the first WNBA player to have 7,000 points and 3,000 rebounds following a victory against the Indiana Fever where she scored 23 points and grabbed 7 rebounds.

September 14, 2013, marked the final regular-season game of Thompson's career which resulted in a victory over the Tulsa Shock. Following the game, an almost hour-long retirement ceremony took place in her honor. Her Storm teammates all wore a number 7 jersey either in a Comets or Storm variant. Despite the absence of Sue Bird who sat out the whole season while recovering from knee surgery, the Storm made the playoffs with the number 4 seed in the Western Conference.

Thompson's final WNBA career game was Game 2 of the first round in the 2013 WNBA Playoffs. The Storm were eliminated in a two-game sweep by the Minnesota Lynx who would win the championship that year. Thompson recorded 13 points, 9 rebounds and 2 steals in the loss.

In 2016, Thompson was again honored by the WNBA, being named in the WNBA Top 20@20 in celebration of the league's twentieth anniversary.

On March 31, 2018, Thompson was named to the 2018 class of inductees for the Naismith Memorial Basketball Hall of Fame.

== WNBA career statistics ==
Legend
GP	Games played	GS	Games started	MPG	Minutes per game	RPG	Rebounds per game
APG	Assists per game	SPG	Steals per game	BPG	Blocks per game	PPG	Points per game
TO	Turnovers per game	FG%	Field-goal percentage	3P%	3-point field-goal percentage	FT%	Free-throw percentage
**Bold**	Career best	°	League leader

†	Denotes seasons in which Thompson won a WNBA championship

=== Regular season ===
Year	Team	GP	GS	MPG	FG%	3P%	FT%	RPG	APG	SPG	BPG	TO	PPG
1997^{†}	Houston	28	28	31.6	.418	.370	.838	6.6	1.1	0.8	**1.0**	2.2	13.2
1998^{†}	Houston	27	27	32.4	.419	.359	.851	7.1	0.9	1.2	0.9	1.7	12.7
1999^{†}	Houston	32	32	33.6	.419	.351	.782	6.4	0.9	1.0	**1.0**	2.2	12.2
2000^{†}	Houston	32	32	34.0	**.469**	.417	.837	7.7	1.5	**1.5**	0.8	2.6	16.9
2001	Houston	30	30	**36.7**	.377	.293	.840	**7.8**	1.9	1.0	0.7	2.9	19.3
2002	Houston	29	29	36.3	.431	.370	.823	7.5	2.1	0.9	0.7	3.1	16.7
2003	Houston	28	28	34.8	.413	.342	.779	5.9	1.7	0.6	0.8	2.4	16.9
2004	Houston	26	26	36.3°	.402	.407	.789	6.0	1.8	0.8	0.9	2.6	**20.0**
2005	Houston	15	15	29.3	.413	.300	.762	3.8	1.5	0.8	0.3	2.1	10.1
2006	Houston	21	21	33.1	.457	.417	.804	5.6	2.2	1.0	0.6	2.4	18.7
2007	Houston	**34**	**34**	36.3°	.420	.400	.834	6.7	**2.8**	0.9	0.7	3.2	18.8
2008	Houston	30	29	35.8°	.413	.406	.859	6.9	2.2	1.1	0.7	3.7	18.1
2009	Los Angeles	**34**	**34**	34.8	.385	.369	.867	5.9	2.3	0.8	0.7	2.7	13.0
2010	Los Angeles	33	33	33.2	.446	.352	.872	6.2	1.8	1.2	0.7	2.3	16.6
2011	Los Angeles	**34**	33	25.0	.386	.339	.833	4.6	1.1	1.2	0.7	2.0	9.9
2012	Seattle	29	5	19.0	.442	**.427**	.833	3.4	0.5	0.5	0.8	**1.2**	8.9
2013	Seattle	**34**	**34**	28.7	.410	.370	**.874**	5.8	1.1	0.5	0.6	1.4	14.1
Career	17 years, 3 teams	496	470	32.4	.418	.371	.832	6.2	1.6	0.9	0.8	2.4	15.1

=== Postseason ===
Year	Team	GP	GS	MPG	FG%	3P%	FT%	RPG	APG	SPG	BPG	TO	PPG
1997^{†}	Houston	2	2	37.0	.429	.400	.600	9.0	1.5	1.0	0.5	3.0	13.0
1998^{†}	Houston	5	5	37.2	.408	.350	.917	**9.2**	1.2	1.4	0.8	1.6	11.6
1999^{†}	Houston	**6**	**6**	34.7	.368	.375	.762	5.0	0.7	0.8	1.2	2.1	11.2
2000^{†}	Houston	**6**	**6**	38.8	.403	.391	.944	8.0	1.7	0.8	0.8	1.6	12.7
2001	Houston	2	2	34.0	**.550**	**.600**	.800	6.0	**3.5**	0.5	0.0	5.0	14.5
2002	Houston	3	3	**42.7**°	.364	.333	.700	8.0	1.3	**2.0**	1.0	**0.6**	14.3
2003	Houston	3	3	35.3	.391	.231	.857	4.7	1.7	0.7	**2.0**	2.0	15.0
2005	Houston	5	5	33.6	.491	.300	.714	5.6	1.2	0.4	1.2	1.8	13.8
2006	Houston	2	2	31.5	.381	.400	**1.000**	2.5	1.5	1.0	0.5	2.5	13.5
2009	Los Angeles	**6**	**6**	36.3	.378	.462	.958	7.0	2.8	0.8	0.7	2.5	15.2
2010	Los Angeles	2	2	39.0°	.333	.286	**1.000**	6.0	3.0	1.5	**2.0**	1.5	**17.0**
2012	Seattle	3	0	17.0	.364	.333	.500	6.7	0.0	0.0	0.0	1.3	7.0
2013	Seattle	2	2	32.6	.423	.000	.500	8.5	0.0	1.0	0.0	2.0	11.5
Career	13 years, 3 teams	47	44	35.0	.403	.355	.838	6.7	1.5	0.9	0.9	2.0	13.0

== International career ==
Thompson was an alternate for the 2000 Olympic squad. Thompson was a member of the U.S. women's basketball team and she earned a gold medal at the Summer Olympic Games: Beijing 2008. She was named to the 1998 and 2002 USA World Championship teams, but injuries kept her from both competitions. She earned her gold medal in 2004 in Greece.

Thompson has also participated in other professional leagues overseas. Following the 2001 WNBA season, Thompson played for Rovereto Basket in Rovereto, Italy, and in 2003 she played for the Kumho Falcons of the Women's Korea Basketball League (WKBL).

== Coaching career ==
On March 18, 2015, the University of Texas at Austin athletic department announced Thompson's hire as an assistant coach for the Longhorn women's basketball team, beginning her collegiate coaching career. Two years later, Thompson was promoted to Associate Head Coach with the Lady Longhorns.

After three seasons with the Lady Longhorns, Thompson was named head coach of the Virginia Cavaliers women's basketball program on April 16, 2018. She was hired by the first African American female athletics director of any power conference university, Carla Williams. On March 3, 2022, the university announced that Thompson had been relieved of her duties after going 30-63 during her tenure.

== Head coaching record ==
Record table
Season	Team	Overall	Conference	Standing	Postseason
Virginia Cavaliers (Atlantic Coast Conference) (2018–2022)
2018–19	Virginia	12–19	5–11	12th	
2019–20	Virginia	13–17	8–10	T-9th	
2020–21	Virginia	0–5	0–2	N/A	
2021–22	Virginia	5–22	2–16	T-14th	
Virginia:		30–63 (.323)	15–39 (.278)		
Total:		30–63 (.323)			
National champion Postseason invitational champion Conference regular season champion Conference regular season and conference tournament champion Division regular season champion Division regular season and conference tournament champion Conference tournament champion

== Overseas ==
- 2001–2002: (Italy) Rovereto Basket
- 2003: (South Korea) Incheon Kumho Life Falcons
- 2005–2006: (South Korea) Cheonan Kookmin Bank Savers
- 2006–2007: (Russia) Spartak Moscow Region
- 2010: (Romania) Municipal MCM Târgovişte
- 2012–2013: (South Korea) Chuncheon Woori Bank Hansae
- 2013–2014: (South Korea) Guri KDB Life Winnus

== Awards and achievements ==
- 4-time WNBA Championship
- 2-time Olympic gold medalist
- 2000 WNBA All-Star selection (MVP)
- 9-time WNBA All-Star selection
- Named to the All-WNBA team 8 times
- Member of the WNBA All-Decade Team
- 3rd in WNBA all-time scoring

== See also ==
- List of WNBA career games played leaders
- List of WNBA career minutes played leaders
- List of WNBA career rebounding leaders
- List of WNBA career turnovers leaders
