= 2000 Phoenix Mercury season =

WNBA team season

- Head coach: Cheryl Miller
- Arena: America West Arena

Results
- Record: 20–12 (.625)
- Place: 4th (Western)
- Playoff finish: Lost First Round (2-0) to Los Angeles Sparks

The 2000 WNBA season was the fourth season for the Phoenix Mercury. They made the playoffs for the first time in two years but were swept in the first round to the Los Angeles Sparks. It was the last time Phoenix were in the playoffs until the 2007 season.

== Transactions ==
=== Seattle Storm expansion draft ===
The following players were selected in the Seattle Storm expansion draft from the Phoenix Mercury:

| Player | Nationality | School/Team/Country |
|---|---|---|
| Edna Campbell | United States | Texas |
| Toni Foster | United States | Iowa |

=== WNBA draft ===
| Round | Pick | Player | Nationality | School/Team/Country |
|---|---|---|---|---|
| 2 | 21 | Adrian Williams | United States | USC |
| 3 | 37 | Tauja Catchings | United States | Illinois |
| 4 | 53 | Shantia Owens | United States | Kentucky |

=== Transactions ===
| Date | Transaction |
|---|---|
| December 15, 1999 | Lost Edna Campbell and Toni Foster to the Seattle Storm in the WNBA expansion draft |
| February 21, 2000 | Traded a 2000 1st Round Pick to the Minnesota Lynx in exchange for Brandy Reed |
| April 25, 2000 | Drafted Adrian Williams, Tauja Catchings and Shantia Owens in the 2000 WNBA draft |
| April 25, 2000 | Traded Shantia Owens to the Miami Sol in exchange for a 2001 4th Round Pick |
| May 28, 2000 | Waived Adia Barnes |
| June 19, 2000 | Signed Dena Head |
| June 19, 2000 | Waived Mactabene Amachree |
| July 30, 2000 | Signed Nicole Kubik |

== Roster ==
2000 Phoenix Mercury roster
Players
Coaches

| Pos. | No. | Nat. | Name | Height | Weight | DOB | From | Yrs |
|---|---|---|---|---|---|---|---|---|
| F | 12 | (Australia) | Brogan, Michelle | 6' 1" (1.85m) | 177 lb (80kg) | 1973-02-08 | | 1 |
| G | 4 | (Australia) | Cleary, Michelle | 5' 6" (1.68m) | | 1974-07-16 | | R |
| G | 13 | (United States) | Edwards, Tonya | 5' 10" (1.78m) | 160 lb (73kg) | 1968-03-13 | Tennessee | 1 |
| F/C | 22 | (United States) | Gillom, Jennifer | 6' 3" (1.91m) | 180 lb (82kg) | 1964-06-13 | Mississippi | 3 |
| F | 3 | (United States) | Harrison, Lisa | 6' 1" (1.85m) | 164 lb (74kg) | 1971-01-02 | Tennessee | 1 |
| G | 5 | (United States) | Head, Dena | 5' 10" (1.78m) | 175 lb (79kg) | 1970-08-16 | Tennessee | 2 |
| G | 10 | (United States) | Kubik, Nicole | 5' 9" (1.75m) | 145 lb (66kg) | 1978-03-01 | Nebraska | R |
| G | 32 | (United States) | Pettis, Bridget | 5' 9" (1.75m) | 150 lb (68kg) | 1971-01-01 | Florida | 3 |
| F | 23 | (United States) | Reed, Brandy | 6' 1" (1.85m) | 168 lb (76kg) | 1977-02-17 | Southern Miss | 2 |
| C | 11 | (Socialist Federal Republic of Yugoslavia) | Šarenac, Rankica | 6' 6" (1.98m) | 222 lb (101kg) | 1974-06-27 | | R |
| C | 8 | (Soviet Union) | Stepanova, Maria | 6' 8" (2.03m) | 187 lb (85kg) | 1979-01-23 | | 2 |
| G | 7 | (Australia) | Timms, Michele | 5' 7" (1.7m) | 132 lb (60kg) | 1965-06-28 | | 3 |
| F/C | 33 | (United States) | Williams, Adrian | 6' 5" (1.96m) | 170 lb (77kg) | 1977-02-15 | USC | R |
| F | 30 | (United States) | Wilson, Amanda | 5' 11" (1.8m) | 176 lb (80kg) | 1977-02-06 | Louisiana Tech | 1 |

Head coach
(United States) Cheryl Miller (USC)

Legend

- (C) Team captain
- (DP) Unsigned draft pick
- (FA) Free agent
- (S) Suspended
- Injured

== Schedule ==
=== Regular season ===
2000 game log
Total: 20–12 (Home: 11–5; Road: 9–7)
May: 1–0 (Home: 1–0; Road: 0–0)

| Game | Date | Team | Score | High points | High rebounds | High assists | Location Attendance | Record |
|---|---|---|---|---|---|---|---|---|
| 1 | May 31 | New York | W 51-48 | Brandy Reed (22) | Brandy Reed (7) | Michelle Cleary (3) | America West Arena | 1–0 |

June: 8–5 (Home: 2–1; Road: 6–4)

| Game | Date | Team | Score | High points | High rebounds | High assists | Location Attendance | Record |
|---|---|---|---|---|---|---|---|---|
| 2 | June 3 | @ Houston | W 80-62 | Brandy Reed (32) | Brandy Reed (5) | Michelle Cleary (5) | Compaq Center | 2–0 |
| 3 | June 6 | @ Utah | L 61-76 | Edwards; Reed (13) | Brandy Reed (8) | Michelle Cleary (3) | Delta Center | 2–1 |
| 4 | June 7 | Seattle | W 82-49 | Brandy Reed (24) | Maria Stepanova (12) | Brogan; Cleary; Timms (3) | America West Arena | 3–1 |
| 5 | June 10 | @ Los Angeles | L 57-76 | Michele Timms (11) | Bridget Pettis (7) | Tonya Edwards (4) | Great Western Forum | 3–2 |
| 6 | June 13 | @ Portland | W 75-69 | Brandy Reed (23) | Brandy Reed (5) | Michele Timms (6) | Rose Garden | 4–2 |
| 7 | June 14 | Portland | W 81-80 (OT) | Jennifer Gillom (28) | Brogan; Gillom (7) | Michele Timms (5) | America West Arena | 5–2 |
| 8 | June 17 | Minnesota | L 62-69 | Brandy Reed (22) | Maria Stepanova (8) | Jennifer Gillom (4) | America West Arena | 5–3 |
| 9 | June 20 | @ Minnesota | W 74-55 | Bridget Pettis (22) | Michelle Brogan (9) | Bridget Pettis (5) | Target Center | 6–3 |
| 10 | June 22 | @ Charlotte | W 90-57 | Brandy Reed (32) | Brandy Reed (13) | Brandy Reed (6) | Charlotte Coliseum | 7–3 |
| 11 | June 24 | @ Miami | W 67-44 | Tonya Edwards (12) | Maria Stepanova (7) | Brandy Reed (4) | American Airlines Arena | 8–3 |
| 12 | June 25 | @ Cleveland | L 61-64 | Brandy Reed (19) | Gillom; Reed (6) | Gillom; Pettis (4) | Gund Arena | 8–4 |
| 13 | June 28 | @ New York | L 69-82 | Michelle Brogan (17) | Brandy Reed (7) | Michelle Cleary (6) | Madison Square Garden | 8–5 |
| 14 | June 30 | @ Washington | W 66-57 | Brandy Reed (25) | Maria Stepanova (7) | Cleary; Pettis (4) | MCI Center | 9–5 |

July: 8–5 (Home: 6–2; Road: 2–3)

| Game | Date | Team | Score | High points | High rebounds | High assists | Location Attendance | Record |
|---|---|---|---|---|---|---|---|---|
| 15 | July 2 | @ Houston | L 58-69 | Tonya Edwards (14) | Harrison; Stepanova (5) | Brandy Reed (3) | Compaq Center | 9–6 |
| 16 | July 6 | Detroit | W 83-69 | Brandy Reed (22) | Brandy Reed (10) | Brandy Reed (8) | America West Arena | 10–6 |
| 17 | July 8 | @ Indiana | W 66-65 | Rankica Šarenac (15) | Brandy Reed (8) | Tonya Edwards (3) | Conseco Fieldhouse | 11–6 |
| 18 | July 11 | Minnesota | W 64-54 | Lisa Harrison (22) | Lisa Harrison (8) | Cleary; Reed (4) | America West Arena | 12–6 |
| 19 | July 13 | Sacramento | W 72-64 | Brandy Reed (25) | Brandy Reed (10) | Brandy Reed (5) | America West Arena | 13–6 |
| 20 | July 14 | @ Utah | L 84-87 | Brandy Reed (25) | Rankica Šarenac (8) | Michelle Cleary (4) | Delta Center | 13–7 |
| 21 | July 19 | Utah | W 86-76 | Brandy Reed (31) | Harrison; Reed (5) | Michelle Cleary (12) | America West Arena | 14–7 |
| 22 | July 21 | Los Angeles | L 68-74 | Brandy Reed (21) | Brandy Reed (10) | Michelle Cleary (6) | America West Arena | 14–8 |
| 23 | July 22 | @ Sacramento | L 60-61 | Brandy Reed (22) | Lisa Harrison (8) | Tonya Edwards (4) | ARCO Arena | 14–9 |
| 24 | July 24 | Cleveland | W 67-57 | Brandy Reed (31) | Harrison; Reed (8) | Bridget Pettis (3) | America West Arena | 15–9 |
| 25 | July 26 | Indiana | W 79-65 | Brandy Reed (24) | Jennifer Gillom (9) | Head; Reed (4) | America West Arena | 16–9 |
| 26 | July 28 | @ Seattle | W 65-55 | Brandy Reed (25) | Brandy Reed (9) | Brandy Reed (3) | KeyArena | 17–9 |
| 27 | July 30 | Sacramento | L 63-70 | Jennifer Gillom (23) | Jennifer Gillom (9) | Bridget Pettis (5) | America West Arena | 17–10 |

August: 3–2 (Home: 2–2; Road: 1–0)

| Game | Date | Team | Score | High points | High rebounds | High assists | Location Attendance | Record |
|---|---|---|---|---|---|---|---|---|
| 28 | August 1 | Orlando | W 84-77 | Jennifer Gillom (28) | Jennifer Gillom (7) | Michelle Brogan (4) | America West Arena | 18–10 |
| 29 | August 3 | Seattle | W 85-63 | Edwards; Harrison (15) | Adrian Williams (10) | Tonya Edwards (4) | America West Arena | 19–10 |
| 30 | August 5 | Los Angeles | L 63-77 | Brandy Reed (25) | Brandy Reed (7) | Brandy Reed (5) | America West Arena | 19–11 |
| 31 | August 7 | Houston | L 54-71 | Brandy Reed (21) | Jennifer Gillom (6) | Brogan; Pettis; Reed (3) | America West Arena | 19–12 |
| 32 | August 9 | @ Portland | W 68-60 | Brandy Reed (18) | Harrison; Reed (7) | Lisa Harrison (4) | Rose Garden | 20–12 |

=== Playoffs ===
2000 playoff game log
First round vs. Los Angeles Sparks
Lost Series: 0–2

| Game | Date | Team | Score | High points | High rebounds | High assists | Location Attendance | Record |
|---|---|---|---|---|---|---|---|---|
| 1 | August 11 | Los Angeles | L 71–86 | Brandy Reed (17) | Lisa Harrison (9) | Brandy Reed (6) | America West Arena | 0–1 |
| 2 | August 13 | @ Los Angeles | L 76–101 | Gillom; Harrison (16) | Michelle Brogan (6) | Lisa Harrison (5) | Great Western Forum | 0–2 |

2000 playoff schedule

=== Season standings ===
| Western Conference | W | L | PCT | Conf. | GB |
|---|---|---|---|---|---|
| Los Angeles Sparks ^{x} | 28 | 4 | .875 | 17–4 | – |
| Houston Comets ^{x} | 27 | 5 | .844 | 17–4 | 1.0 |
| Sacramento Monarchs ^{x} | 21 | 11 | .656 | 13–8 | 7.0 |
| Phoenix Mercury ^{x} | 20 | 12 | .625 | 11–10 | 8.0 |
| Utah Starzz ^{o} | 18 | 14 | .563 | 13–8 | 10.0 |
| Minnesota Lynx ^{o} | 15 | 17 | .469 | 5–16 | 13.0 |
| Portland Fire ^{o} | 10 | 22 | .313 | 4–17 | 18.0 |
| Seattle Storm ^{o} | 6 | 26 | .188 | 4–17 | 22.0 |

== Statistics ==
Legend
| GP | Games played | GS | Games started | MPG | Minutes per game | RPG | Rebounds per game |
| APG | Assists per game | SPG | Steals per game | BPG | Blocks per game | PPG | Points per game |
| FG% | Field-goal percentage | 3P% | 3-point field-goal percentage | FT% | Free-throw percentage | TO | Turnovers per game |
| PF | Fouls per game | | Team leader | | League leader |

=== Regular season ===
| Player | GP | GS | MPG | FG% | 3P% | FT% | RPG | APG | SPG | BPG | PPG |
|---|---|---|---|---|---|---|---|---|---|---|---|
| Brandy Reed | 32 | 30 | 34.1 | .507 | .419 | .901 | 5.9 | 2.7 | 2.1 | 0.7 | 19.0 |
| Tonya Edwards | 32 | 32 | 28.9 | .376 | .307 | .782 | 2.4 | 1.8 | 1.1 | 0.3 | 10.6 |
| Jennifer Gillom | 30 | 30 | 27.5 | .440 | .275 | .745 | 3.9 | 1.5 | 0.7 | 1.0 | 12.5 |
| Michelle Brogan | 28 | 23 | 25.9 | .511 | .320 | .797 | 4.0 | 1.8 | 1.1 | 0.2 | 7.5 |
| Lisa Harrison | 31 | 20 | 24.2 | .526 | .667 | .811 | 3.9 | 1.2 | 1.0 | 0.1 | 6.5 |
| Michele Timms | 8 | 8 | 22.0 | .367 | .235 | 1.000 | 2.0 | 2.3 | 1.9 | 0.3 | 3.8 |
| Michelle Cleary | 24 | 7 | 21.2 | .311 | .333 | .704 | 1.5 | 3.2 | 1.4 | 0.1 | 2.5 |
| Bridget Pettis | 32 | 6 | 18.2 | .357 | .267 | .803 | 1.9 | 1.4 | 1.0 | 0.1 | 5.9 |
| Adrian Williams | 28 | 2 | 12.5 | .403 | N/A | .526 | 2.5 | 0.6 | 0.5 | 0.1 | 2.8 |
| Maria Stepanova | 15 | 1 | 11.3 | .444 | N/A | .600 | 3.2 | 0.5 | 0.3 | 0.6 | 3.8 |
| Dena Head | 17 | 1 | 8.8 | .364 | .143 | .625 | 1.1 | 0.9 | 0.2 | 0.0 | 1.6 |
| Rankica Šarenac | 20 | 0 | 7.1 | .523 | 1.000 | .630 | 1.5 | 0.4 | 0.0 | 0.1 | 3.2 |
| Nicole Kubik | 4 | 0 | 4.8 | .333 | .000 | 1.000 | 0.5 | 0.5 | 0.0 | 0.0 | 1.5 |
| Amanda Wilson | 3 | 0 | 3.0 | .000 | N/A | .500 | 0.3 | 0.3 | 0.0 | 0.0 | 0.7 |

^{‡}Waived/Released during the season
^{†}Traded during the season
^{≠}Acquired during the season
