= 2001 Phoenix Mercury season =

- Head coach: Cynthia Cooper
- Arena: America West Arena

Results
- Record: 13–19 (.406)
- Place: 5th (Western)
- Playoff finish: Did not qualify

Media
- Television: KASW (WB 61); Cox 9

The 2001 WNBA season was the fifth for the Phoenix Mercury. Cynthia Cooper became the second head coach in franchise history.

== Transactions ==
=== WNBA draft ===
| Round | Pick | Player | Nationality | School/Team/Country |
|---|---|---|---|---|
| 1 | 13 | Kristen Veal | Australia | Canberra Capitals (Australia) |
| 2 | 29 | Ilona Korstine | Soviet Union | CJM Bourges Basket (France) |
| 3 | 45 | Tere Williams | United States | Virginia Tech |
| 4 | 53 | Carolyn Moos | United States | Stanford |
| 4 | 61 | Megan Franza | United States | Washington |

=== Transactions ===
| Date | Transaction |
|---|---|
| December 1, 2000 | Cheryl Miller resigned as Head Coach |
| January 8, 2001 | Hired Cynthia Cooper as Head Coach |
| April 20, 2001 | Drafted Kristen Veal, Ilona Korstine, Tere Williams, Carolyn Moos and Megan Franza in the 2001 WNBA draft |
| April 30, 2001 | Signed Pat Luckey and Slobodanka Tuvić |
| May 7, 2001 | Waived Megan Franza |
| May 27, 2001 | Traded a 2002 2nd Round Pick to the Cleveland Rockers in exchange for Jaynetta Saunders |
| May 27, 2001 | Waived Amanda Wilson, Carolyn Moos, Nicole Kubik and Tere Williams |
| May 31, 2001 | Suspended contract of Brandy Reed |
| June 5, 2001 | Waived Michelle Cleary |
| June 5, 2001 | Signed Nicole Kubik |
| June 16, 2001 | Waived Nicole Kubik |
| June 22, 2001 | Traded Tonya Edwards to the Charlotte Sting in exchange for a 2002 2nd Round Pick |
| June 22, 2001 | Suspended contract of Ilona Korstine |
| June 29, 2001 | Waived Pat Luckey |
| June 29, 2001 | Signed E.C. Hill |
| July 4, 2001 | Waived E.C. Hill |
| August 3, 2001 | Signed Adriana Moisés |

== Roster ==
2001 Phoenix Mercury roster
Players
Coaches

| Pos. | No. | Nat. | Name | Height | Weight | DOB | From | Yrs |
|---|---|---|---|---|---|---|---|---|
| G | 4 | (Australia) | Cleary, Michelle | 5' 6" (1.68m) | | 1974-07-16 | | 1 |
| G | 13 | (United States) | Edwards, Tonya | 5' 10" (1.78m) | 160 lb (73kg) | 1968-03-13 | Tennessee | 2 |
| G/F | 9 | (Australia) | Fallon, Trisha | 6' 3" (1.91m) | 165 lb (75kg) | 1972-07-23 | | 1 |
| F/C | 22 | (United States) | Gillom, Jennifer | 6' 3" (1.91m) | 180 lb (82kg) | 1964-06-13 | Mississippi | 4 |
| F | 3 | (United States) | Harrison, Lisa | 6' 1" (1.85m) | 164 lb (74kg) | 1971-01-02 | Tennessee | 2 |
| G | 4 | (United States) | Hill, E.C. | 5' 8" (1.73m) | 140 lb (64kg) | 1971-07-06 | Northern Illinois | 1 |
| G | 10 | (Soviet Union) | Korstine, Ilona | 6' 0" (1.83m) | 160 lb (73kg) | 1980-05-30 | | R |
| G | 10 | (United States) | Kubik, Nicole | 5' 9" (1.75m) | 145 lb (66kg) | 1978-03-01 | Nebraska | 1 |
| F | 28 | (United States) | Luckey, Pat | 6' 1" (1.85m) | | 1975-05-14 | Houston | R |
| G | 4 | (Brazil) | Moisés, Adriana | 5' 6" (1.68m) | 140 lb (64kg) | 1978-12-06 | | R |
| G | 32 | (United States) | Pettis, Bridget | 5' 9" (1.75m) | 150 lb (68kg) | 1971-01-01 | Florida | 4 |
| F | 23 | (United States) | Reed, Brandy | 6' 1" (1.85m) | 168 lb (76kg) | 1977-02-17 | Southern Miss | 3 |
| F | 21 | (United States) | Saunders, Jaynetta | 5' 11" (1.8m) | 145 lb (66kg) | 1979-08-21 | Texas A&M | R |
| C | 8 | (Soviet Union) | Stepanova, Maria | 6' 8" (2.03m) | 187 lb (85kg) | 1979-01-23 | | 3 |
| G | 7 | (Australia) | Timms, Michele | 5' 7" (1.7m) | 132 lb (60kg) | 1965-06-28 | | 4 |
| C | 14 | (Socialist Federal Republic of Yugoslavia) | Tuvić, Slobodanka | 6' 4" (1.93m) | 194 lb (88kg) | 1977-09-19 | | R |
| G | 5 | (Australia) | Veal, Kristen | 5' 10" (1.78m) | 150 lb (68kg) | 1981-07-24 | | R |
| F/C | 33 | (United States) | Williams, Adrian | 6' 5" (1.96m) | 170 lb (77kg) | 1977-02-15 | USC | 1 |

Head coach
(United States) Cynthia Cooper (USC)

Legend

- (C) Team captain
- (DP) Unsigned draft pick
- (FA) Free agent
- (S) Suspended
- Injured

== Schedule ==
=== Regular season ===
2001 game log
Total: 13–19 (Home: 10–6; Road: 3–13)
May: 0–2 (Home: 0–1; Road: 0–1)

| Game | Date | Team | Score | High points | High rebounds | High assists | Location Attendance | Record |
|---|---|---|---|---|---|---|---|---|
| 1 | May 30 | Utah | L 62–81 | Tonya Edwards (15) | Maria Stepanova (7) | Michelle Cleary (3) | America West Arena | 0–1 |
| 2 | May 31 | @ Seattle | L 70–83 | Edwards; Harrison (14) | Bridget Pettis (8) | Kristen Veal (5) | KeyArena | 0–2 |

June: 4–6 (Home: 3–3; Road: 1–3)

| Game | Date | Team | Score | High points | High rebounds | High assists | Location Attendance | Record |
|---|---|---|---|---|---|---|---|---|
| 3 | June 2 | @ Minnesota | W 89–80 | Bridget Pettis (26) | Lisa Harrison (7) | Michelle Cleary (6) | Target Center | 1–2 |
| 4 | June 4 | @ Portland | L 69–71 (OT) | Jennifer Gillom (14) | Jennifer Gillom (11) | Kristen Veal (5) | Rose Garden | 1–3 |
| 5 | June 5 | Charlotte | W 76–69 | Trisha Fallon (18) | Maria Stepanova (8) | Kristen Veal (7) | America West Arena | 2–3 |
| 6 | June 10 | Houston | L 58–60 | Jennifer Gillom (15) | Harrison; Stepanova (6) | Kristen Veal (10) | America West Arena | 2–4 |
| 7 | June 12 | Sacramento | W 78–64 | Jennifer Gillom (24) | Stepanova; Tuvić (7) | Kristen Veal (9) | America West Arena | 3–4 |
| 8 | June 14 | @ Sacramento | L 59–81 | Lisa Harrison (13) | Maria Stepanova (5) | Kristen Veal (5) | ARCO Arena | 3–5 |
| 9 | June 16 | Orlando | W 72–68 | Lisa Harrison (15) | Adrian Williams (6) | Kristen Veal (8) | America West Arena | 4–5 |
| 10 | June 21 | New York | L 70–95 | Pettis; Williams (12) | Adrian Williams (7) | Kristen Veal (3) | America West Arena | 4–6 |
| 11 | June 22 | Seattle | L 55–58 | Trisha Fallon (12) | Maria Stepanova (6) | Michele Timms (5) | America West Arena | 4–7 |
| 12 | June 29 | @ Detroit | L 71–75 | Jennifer Gillom (25) | Jennifer Gillom (9) | Michele Timms (5) | The Palace of Auburn Hills | 4–8 |

July : 7–5 (Home: 5–1; Road: 2–4)

| Game | Date | Team | Score | High points | High rebounds | High assists | Location Attendance | Record |
|---|---|---|---|---|---|---|---|---|
| 13 | July 1 | @ Indiana | L 78–86 (OT) | Trisha Fallon (18) | Maria Stepanova (9) | Michele Timms (7) | Conseco Fieldhouse | 4–9 |
| 14 | July 4 | Miami | W 60–47 | Kristen Veal (16) | Gillom; Stepanova (5) | Kristen Veal (4) | America West Arena | 5–9 |
| 15 | July 5 | @ Los Angeles | L 50–73 | Adrian Williams (12) | Fallon; Stepanova (5) | Korstine; Timms (3) | Staples Center | 5–10 |
| 16 | July 7 | Washington | W 66–52 | Trisha Fallon (16) | Maria Stepanova (9) | Michele Timms (6) | America West Arena | 6–10 |
| 17 | July 11 | Los Angeles | L 61–75 | Jennifer Gillom (15) | Gillom; Timms (6) | Kristen Veal (7) | America West Arena | 6–11 |
| 18 | July 13 | @ Cleveland | L 61–69 | Maria Stepanova (13) | Michele Timms (6) | Michele Timms (7) | Gund Arena | 6–12 |
| 19 | July 14 | @ Minnesota | W 80–67 | Maria Stepanova (19) | Maria Stepanova (9) | Michele Timms (5) | Target Center | 7–12 |
| 20 | July 19 | Portland | W 60–58 | Jennifer Gillom (18) | Maria Stepanova (10) | Timms; Veal (4) | America West Arena | 8–12 |
| 21 | July 21 | Utah | W 59–50 | Jennifer Gillom (18) | Jaynetta Saunders (9) | Maria Stepanova (5) | America West Arena | 9–12 |
| 22 | July 26 | Detroit | W 63–62 | Maria Stepanova (20) | Gillom; Stepanova (5) | Michele Timms (5) | America West Arena | 10–12 |
| 23 | July 27 | @ Seattle | W 56–54 | Maria Stepanova (11) | Maria Stepanova (9) | Jennifer Gillom (4) | KeyArena | 11–12 |
| 24 | July 29 | @ Sacramento | L 47–63 | Trisha Fallon (18) | Maria Stepanova (8) | Timms; Tuvić (3) | ARCO Arena | 11–13 |

August : 2–6 (Home: 2–1; Road: 0–5)

| Game | Date | Team | Score | High points | High rebounds | High assists | Location Attendance | Record |
|---|---|---|---|---|---|---|---|---|
| 25 | August 1 | Minnesota | L 63–68 | Gillom; Stepanova (15) | Slobodanka Tuvić (6) | Timms; Veal (5) | America West Arena | 11–14 |
| 26 | August 3 | @ Miami | L 61–72 | Jennifer Gillom (25) | Adriana Moisés (5) | Gillom; Moisés; Tuvić; Veal (2) | American Airlines Arena | 11–15 |
| 27 | August 3 | @ Orlando | L 69–78 | Trisha Fallon (17) | Jennifer Gillom (7) | Kristen Veal (7) | TD Waterhouse Centre | 11–16 |
| 28 | August 6 | @ Houston | L 48–62 | Trisha Fallon (12) | Maria Stepanova (11) | Moisés; Veal (3) | Compaq Center | 11–17 |
| 29 | August 8 | @ Los Angeles | L 67–79 | Trisha Fallon (15) | Jennifer Gillom (6) | Michele Timms (6) | Staples Center | 11–18 |
| 30 | August 10 | @ Utah | L 57–69 | Jennifer Gillom (10) | Stepanova; Tuvić (5) | Michele Timms (4) | Delta Center | 11–19 |
| 31 | August 11 | Portland | W 73–62 | Trisha Fallon (24) | Jennifer Gillom (8) | Fallon; Gillom (3) | America West Arena | 12–19 |
| 32 | August 14 | Houston | W 56–38 | Trisha Fallon (14) | Fallon; Harrison (7) | Timms; Veal (4) | America West Arena | 13–19 |

2001 season schedule

=== Season standings ===
| Western Conference | W | L | PCT | Conf. | GB |
|---|---|---|---|---|---|
| Los Angeles Sparks ^{x} | 28 | 4 | .875 | 19–2 | – |
| Sacramento Monarchs ^{x} | 20 | 12 | .625 | 13–8 | 8.0 |
| Utah Starzz ^{x} | 19 | 13 | .594 | 11–10 | 9.0 |
| Houston Comets ^{x} | 19 | 13 | .594 | 13–8 | 9.0 |
| Phoenix Mercury ^{o} | 13 | 19 | .406 | 8–13 | 15.0 |
| Minnesota Lynx ^{o} | 12 | 20 | .375 | 9–12 | 16.0 |
| Portland Fire ^{o} | 11 | 21 | .344 | 5–16 | 17.0 |
| Seattle Storm ^{o} | 10 | 22 | .313 | 6–15 | 18.0 |

== Statistics ==
Legend
| GP | Games played | GS | Games started | MPG | Minutes per game | RPG | Rebounds per game |
| APG | Assists per game | SPG | Steals per game | BPG | Blocks per game | PPG | Points per game |
| FG% | Field-goal percentage | 3P% | 3-point field-goal percentage | FT% | Free-throw percentage | TO | Turnovers per game |
| PF | Fouls per game | | Team leader | | League leader |

=== Regular season ===
| Player | GP | GS | MPG | FG% | 3P% | FT% | RPG | APG | SPG | BPG | PPG |
|---|---|---|---|---|---|---|---|---|---|---|---|
| Lisa Harrison | 32 | 32 | 28,6 | .430 | .333 | .864 | 4.3 | 1.6 | 1.2 | 0.0 | 7.7 |
| Trisha Fallon | 31 | 16 | 27.1 | .490 | .405 | .815 | 2.5 | 1.1 | 1.1 | 0.4 | 10.4 |
| Jennifer Gillom | 32 | 32 | 26.8 | .423 | .343 | .740 | 4.0 | 1.1 | 1.0 | 0.6 | 12.3 |
| Maria Stepanova | 32 | 31 | 25.5 | .507 | .000 | .615 | 6.3 | 1.3 | 1.3 | 2.0 | 10.4 |
| Kristen Veal | 29 | 14 | 22.7 | .280 | .280 | .762 | 2.1 | 4.3 | 1.1 | 0.1 | 4.0 |
| Tonya Edwards | 10 | 9 | 20.8 | .366 | .357 | .787 | 1.9 | 1.8 | 0.5 | 0.1 | 9.4 |
| Michele Timms | 21 | 18 | 19.4 | .345 | .304 | .800 | 2.1 | 4.1 | 1.0 | 0.1 | 4.7 |
| Adriana Moisés | 7 | 0 | 17.6 | .389 | .333 | .750 | 2.3 | 2.4 | 0.9 | 0.0 | 5.9 |
| Bridget Pettis | 32 | 1 | 15.5 | .333 | .317 | .821 | 1.9 | 1.6 | 0.9 | 0.1 | 5.4 |
| Adrian Williams | 25 | 1 | 15.0 | .336 | N/A | .714 | 3.0 | 0.4 | 0.6 | 0.2 | 3.8 |
| Brandy Reed | 1 | 0 | 13.0 | .125 | N/A | 1.000 | 3.0 | 0.0 | 0.0 | 0.0 | 3.0 |
| Michelle Cleary | 4 | 0 | 12.3 | .000 | .000 | 1.000 | 0.8 | 2.3 | 0.5 | 0.0 | 0.5 |
| Slobodanka Tuvić | 30 | 0 | 10.8 | .310 | N/A | .475 | 2.1 | 0.6 | 0.5 | 0.6 | 1.8 |
| Jaynetta Saunders | 28 | 6 | 9.0 | .325 | .333 | .680 | 1.4 | 0.3 | 0.4 | 0.3 | 2.4 |
| Pat Luckey | 1 | 0 | 8.0 | .000 | N/A | N/A | 1.0 | 1.0 | 0.0 | 1.0 | 0.0 |
| Nicole Kubik | 3 | 0 | 7.0 | .250 | .000 | N/A | 0.7 | 0.7 | 1.3 | 0.0 | 0.7 |
| Ilona Korstine | 12 | 0 | 6.3 | .280 | .333 | .857 | 0.4 | 0.9 | 0.3 | 0.0 | 1.8 |
| E.C. Hill | 3 | 0 | 2.7 | .000 | .000 | N/A | 0.0 | 0.0 | 0.3 | 0.0 | 0.0 |

^{‡}Waived/Released during the season
^{†}Traded during the season
^{≠}Acquired during the season
