= Rankica Šarenac =

Slovenian basketball player and coach

Personal information
- Born: June 27, 1974 (age 52) Sarajevo, SFR Yugoslavia
- Listed height: 1.98 m (6 ft 6 in)

Career information
- Playing career: 1993–2010
- Position: Center

Career history

Playing
- 1988-1993: Bosna
- 1993–1999: Ježica
- 1999–2000: SPAR Gran Canaria
- 2000: Phoenix Mercury
- 2000–2001: SPAR Gran Canaria
- 2001–2003: Tarbes Gespe Bigorre
- 2003–2004: Gambrinus JME
- 2004–2005: Coconuda Maddaloni
- 2005–2006: Lotos Gdynia
- 2006–2008: Rivas Futura
- 2008–2009: USO Mondeville
- 2010: Athlete Celje

Coaching
- 2016: Ježica (assistant)
- Stats at Basketball Reference

Rankica Šarenac (born 27 June 1974 in Sarajevo, SFR Yugoslavia) is a former Bosnian and Slovenian basketball player and basketball coach.

== Career statistics ==
Legend
GP	Games played	GS	Games started	MPG	Minutes per game	RPG	Rebounds per game
APG	Assists per game	SPG	Steals per game	BPG	Blocks per game	PPG	Points per game
TO	Turnovers per game	FG%	Field-goal percentage	3P%	3-point field-goal percentage	FT%	Free-throw percentage
**Bold**	Career best	°	League leader

=== WNBA ===
==== Regular season ====
Year	Team	GP	GS	MPG	FG%	3P%	FT%	RPG	APG	SPG	BPG	TO	PPG
2000	Phoenix	20	0	7.1	.523	1.000	.630	1.5	.4	.0	.1	.9	3.2
