= Adrian Williams-Strong =

American basketball player (born 1977)

Personal information
- Born: February 15, 1977 (age 49) Indianapolis, Indiana, U.S.
- Listed height: 6 ft 4 in (1.93 m)
- Listed weight: 176 lb (80 kg)

Career information
- High school: Clovis West (Fresno, California)
- College: USC (1995–1999)
- WNBA draft: 2000: 2nd round, 21st overall pick
- Drafted by: Phoenix Mercury
- Playing career: 2000–2008
- Position: Forward / center
- Number: 33, 34

Career history
- 2000–2004: Phoenix Mercury
- 2004: San Antonio Stars
- 2006: Minnesota Lynx
- 2007–2008: Sacramento Monarchs

Career highlights
- WNBA All-Star (2003); All Pac-10 (1999)
- Stats at Basketball Reference

Adrian Williams-Strong (born February 15, 1977) is an American former professional basketball player who played in the Women's National Basketball Association (WNBA).

Born in Fresno, California Williams attended college at University of Southern California and graduated in 1999.

Following her collegiate career, she was selected as the 21st overall pick in the 2000 WNBA draft by the Phoenix Mercury and played in the 2003 WNBA All-Star Game. In July 2004, Williams was dealt to the San Antonio Silver Stars.

After spending the 2005 season in Korea, Williams signed with the Minnesota Lynx in 2006. She averaged 4.9 points, 4.7 rebounds and 15.2 minutes per game in her return to the WNBA.

In February 2007, the Lynx traded Williams to the Sacramento Monarchs in exchange for a second-round pick in the 2007 WNBA draft. Then in the winter of 2008 she played in China un until March 2008 where she hurt her left knee and had to have surgery. Coming home, she decided to take a break from the WNBA to let her knees rest.

On November 4, 2017, she was inducted into the Clovis Unified School District Hall of Fame.

She was married to Buddy Strong, keys player for the Dave Matthews Band, with whom she has one son and one daughter.

== WNBA career statistics ==
Legend
GP	Games played	GS	Games started	MPG	Minutes per game	RPG	Rebounds per game
APG	Assists per game	SPG	Steals per game	BPG	Blocks per game	PPG	Points per game
TO	Turnovers per game	FG%	Field-goal percentage	3P%	3-point field-goal percentage	FT%	Free-throw percentage
**Bold**	Career best	°	League leader

=== Regular season ===
Year	Team	GP	GS	MPG	FG%	3P%	FT%	RPG	APG	SPG	BPG	TO	PPG
2000	Phoenix	28	2	12.5	.403	.000	.526	2.5	0.6	0.5	0.1	1.0	2.8
2001	Phoenix	25	1	15.0	.336	.000	.714	3.0	0.4	0.6	0.2	1.4	3.8
2002	Phoenix	32	30	27.4	.467	.000	.700	6.9	**1.1**	**1.5**	**0.9**	2.0	6.3
2003	Phoenix	**34**	**33**	**29.0**	.402	.000	.612	**7.4**	0.9	1.7	0.6	2.1	**9.8**
2004	Phoenix	11	8	13.2	.450	.000	.786	1.9	0.5	1.0	0.5	1.4	5.9
2004	San Antonio	12	0	12.4	.333	.000	.286	2.3	0.7	0.7	0.1	1.0	2.7
2006	Minnesota	32	0	15.2	**.448**	.000	.536	4.7	0.3	0.8	0.3	0.6	4.9
2007	Sacramento	**34**	2	17.9	.475	.000	**.788**	4.5	0.8	0.6	0.2	1.7	6.2
2008	Sacramento	**34**	**33**	20.2	.439	.000	.614	4.9	0.6	0.6	0.2	1.6	6.1
Career	8 years, 4 teams	242	109	19.3	.425	.000	.634	4.7	0.7	0.9	0.4	1.5	5.7

=== Playoffs ===
Year	Team	GP	GS	MPG	FG%	3P%	FT%	RPG	APG	SPG	BPG	TO	PPG
2000	Phoenix	2	0	15.0	.500	.000	.500	2.0	0.5	0.0	**1.0**	0.5	2.5
2007	Sacramento	**3**	0	16.7	.294	.000	**.800**	**5.3**	0.7	0.3	0.3	2.0	4.7
2008	Sacramento	**3**	**3**	**22.3**	**.550**	.000	.500	3.3	**1.3**	**0.7**	0.3	1.3	**7.7**
Career	3 years, 2 teams	8	3	18.4	.439	.000	.667	3.8	0.9	0.4	0.5	1.4	5.3

== Southern California statistics ==
Ratios
Year	Team	GP	FG%	3P%	FT%	RBG	APG	BPG	SPG	PPG
1995-96	Southern California	27	48.9%	50.0%	56.3%	5.81	0.41	0.48	1.19	9.63
1996-97	Southern California	29	40.0%	16.7%	61.8%	5.55	0.79	0.69	0.79	8.10
1997-98	Southern California	27	42.9%	33.3%	57.3%	6.85	0.81	0.93	1.70	12.96
1998-99	Southern California	23	37.4%	15.8%	62.6%	8.30	1.52	1.70	1.65	14.78
Career		106	41.8%	18.8%	59.7%	6.55	0.86	0.92	1.31	11.18

Totals
Year	Team	GP	FG	FGA	3P	3PA	FT	FTA	REB	A	BK	ST	PTS
1995-96	Southern California	27	107	219	1	2	45	80	157	11	13	32	260
1996-97	Southern California	29	88	220	4	24	55	89	161	23	20	23	235
1997-98	Southern California	27	139	324	1	3	71	124	185	22	25	46	350
1998-99	Southern California	23	125	334	3	19	87	139	191	35	39	38	340
Career		106	459	1097	9	48	258	432	694	91	97	139	1185

== Overseas ==
During the 2006-2007 offseason, she played for Perfumerias Avenida in Spain, averaging 10.0 points (40.9 FG%, 33.3 3FG%, 50.0 FT%), 8.5 rebounds, 0.5 assists, 1.7 steals, 0.7 blocks and 27.3 minutes per game.
