= Maria Stepanova =

Russian basketball player (born 1979)

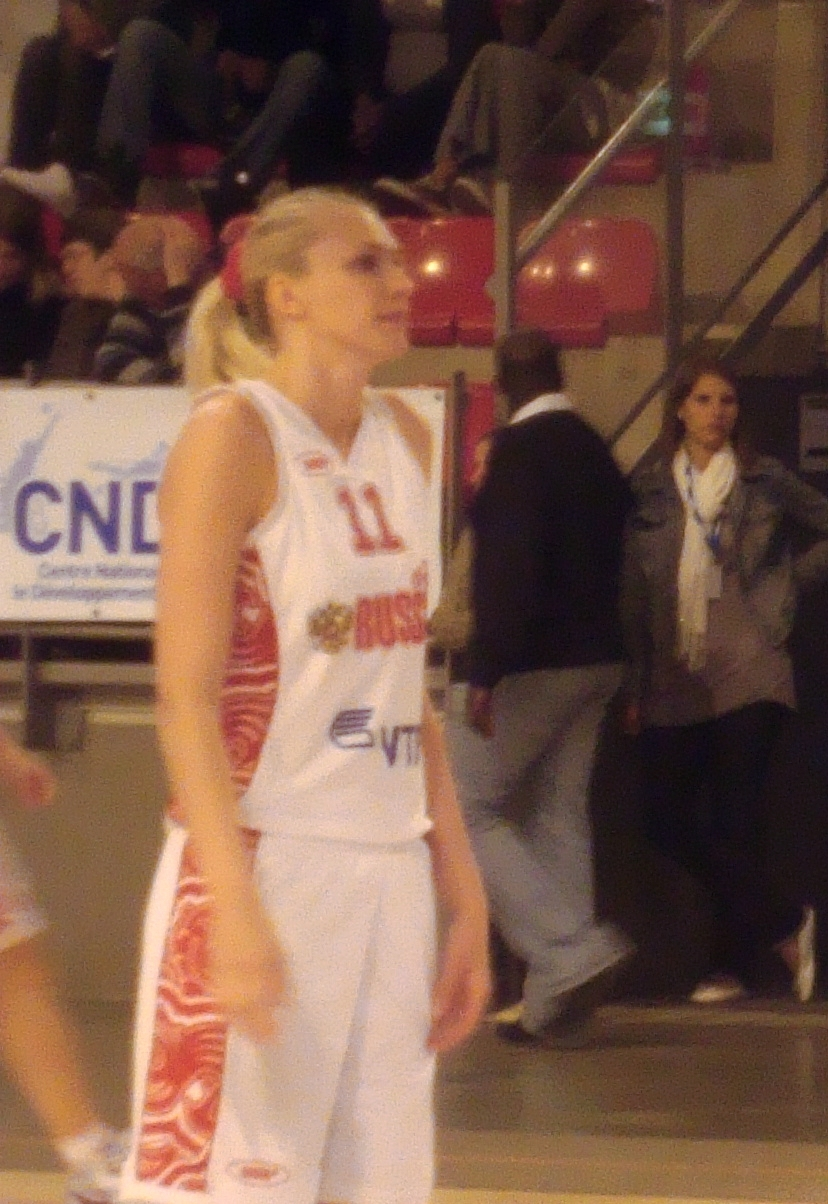

Personal information
- Born: 23 February 1979 (age 47) Shpakovskoye, Stavropol Krai, Russian SFSR, Soviet Union
- Listed height: 6 ft 8 in (2.03 m)
- Listed weight: 187 lb (85 kg)

Career information
- WNBA draft: 1998: 1st round, 8th overall pick
- Drafted by: Phoenix Mercury
- Position: Center

Career history
- 1998–2001, 2005: Phoenix Mercury
- 2006: KB Stars

Career highlights
- WNBA blocks leader (2005); 3× FIBA Europe Women's Player of the Year (2005, 2006, 2008); 3× Russian Player of the Year (2005–2007)
- Stats at Basketball Reference
Medals
Representing Russia
Women's basketball
Olympic Games
Bronze medal – third place	2004 Athens	Team competition
Bronze medal – third place	2008 Beijing	Team competition

Maria Alexandrovna Stepanova (Russian: Мари́я Алекса́ндровна Степа́нова; born 23 February 1979) is a Russian professional and Olympic basketball player. In the United States, she played for the Phoenix Mercury in the Women's National Basketball Association (WNBA).

At a height of 203 cm, she has been the sixth-tallest player in the league (along with Zheng Haixia and Lindsay Taylor). Margo Dydek, 7 ft 2 in (218 cm), Bernadett Határ, 6 ft 10.5 in (210 cm), Han Xu, 6 ft 11 in (211 cm), Brittney Griner and Liz Cambage, both 6 ft 9 in (206 cm), are taller than her. She wears size 15 (US) / 48 (EU) shoes. Though in the Russian national team, she has been overtaken by Ekaterina Lisina in being the tallest member.

Stepanova was born in the village of Shpakovskoye (now the town of Mikhaylovsk, in Stavropol Krai of the former Russian Soviet Federative Socialist Republic of the Soviet Union, and grew up in Tosno, Leningrad Oblast.

== Career statistics ==
Legend
GP	Games played	GS	Games started	MPG	Minutes per game	RPG	Rebounds per game
APG	Assists per game	SPG	Steals per game	BPG	Blocks per game	PPG	Points per game
TO	Turnovers per game	FG%	Field-goal percentage	3P%	3-point field-goal percentage	FT%	Free-throw percentage
**Bold**	Career best	°	League leader

=== WNBA ===
==== Regular season ====
Year	Team	GP	GS	MPG	FG%	3P%	FT%	RPG	APG	SPG	BPG	TO	PPG
1998	Phoenix	20	0	6.5	.426	.000	.636	1.9	.4	.2	.6	**.5**	3.3
1999	Phoenix	**32**°	2	17.3	.485	**.500**	.625	5.1	.8	.4	1.9	1.3	7.8
2000	Phoenix	15	1	11.3	.444	–	.600	3.2	.5	.3	.6	1.5	3.8
2001	Phoenix	**32**°	**31**	25.0	**.507**	.000	.615	**6.3**	1.3	**1.3**	2.0	1.6	10.4
2005	Phoenix	15	14	**27.3**	.472	–	**.650**	5.3	**1.5**	**1.3**	**2.5**	1.5	**10.8**
Career	5 years, 1 team	114	48	18.2	.483	.250	.626	4.7	.9	.7	1.6	1.3	7.6

==== Playoffs ====
Year	Team	GP	GS	MPG	FG%	3P%	FT%	RPG	APG	SPG	BPG	TO	PPG
1998	Phoenix	4	0	5.5	.455	–	.500	1.5	.3	.3	.3	.3	2.8

== Honours and awards ==
- Honoured Master of Sports of Russia
- Medal of the Order "For Merit to the Fatherland", 1st class (2 August 2009) - for outstanding contribution to the development of physical culture and sports, high achievements in sports at the Games of the XXIX Olympiad in Beijing in 2008
- 3× FIBA Europe Women's Player of the Year (2005, 2006, 2008)
