= Jaynetta Saunders =

American basketball player (born 1979)

Personal information
- Born: August 21, 1979 (age 47)

Career information
- High school: Eastern (Louisville, Kentucky)
- College: Southwestern Illinois (1997–1999); Texas A&M (1999–2001)
- WNBA draft: 2001: 2nd round, 27th overall pick
- Drafted by: Cleveland Rockers
- Position: Forward

Career history
- 2001–2002: Phoenix Mercury
- 2005: Cab Madeira
- Stats at Basketball Reference

Jaynetta Carrol Saunders (born August 21, 1979) is a former professional basketball player. She played in Europe (FIBA) and the United States (WNBA).

== Career statistics ==
Legend
GP	Games played	GS	Games started	MPG	Minutes per game	RPG	Rebounds per game
APG	Assists per game	SPG	Steals per game	BPG	Blocks per game	PPG	Points per game
TO	Turnovers per game	FG%	Field-goal percentage	3P%	3-point field-goal percentage	FT%	Free-throw percentage
**Bold**	Career best	°	League leader

=== WNBA ===
WNBA regular season statistics
Year	Team	GP	GS	MPG	FG%	3P%	FT%	RPG	APG	SPG	BPG	TO	PPG
2001	Phoenix	28	**6**	9.0	32.5	**33.3**	**68.0**	1.4	0.3	**0.4**	**0.3**	**0.5**	2.4
2002	Phoenix	28	1	**10.8**	**37.9**	0.0	65.6	1.4	**0.8**	0.3	0.1	0.7	**3.5**
**Career**	2 years, 1 team	56	7	9.9	35.6	14.3	66.7	1.4	0.5	0.3	0.2	0.6	3.0

=== College ===
NCAA statistics
Year	Team	GP	GS	MPG	FG%	3P%	FT%	RPG	APG	SPG	BPG	TO	PPG
1999–00	Texas A&M	27	-	-	**50.1**	24.0	68.0	**7.0**	**2.9**	2.1	**1.9**	-	15.3
2000–01	Texas A&M	**28**	-	-	40.5	**32.6**	**75.8**	6.9	1.8	**2.2**	1.1	-	**21.8**
**Career**		55	-	-	44.1	30.8	72.9	6.9	2.3	2.1	1.5	-	18.6
