= Lisa Harrison =

American basketball player (born 1971)

Personal information
- Born: January 2, 1971 (age 55) Louisville, Kentucky, U.S.
- Listed height: 6 ft 1 in (1.85 m)
- Listed weight: 164 lb (74 kg)

Career information
- High school: Southern (Louisville, Kentucky)
- College: Tennessee (1989–1993)
- WNBA draft: 1999: 3rd round, 34th overall pick
- Drafted by: Phoenix Mercury
- Playing career: 1996–2005
- Position: Forward

Career history
- 1996–1998: Portland Power
- 1998: Columbus Quest
- 1999–2005: Phoenix Mercury

Career highlights
- NCAA champion (1991); Kodak All-American (1993); First-team All-SEC (1993); SEC All-Freshman Team (1990); Naismith Prep Player of the Year (1989); Gatorade National Player of the Year (1989); Kentucky Miss Basketball (1989)
- Stats at Basketball Reference

Lisa Harrison (born January 2, 1971) is an American former professional basketball player for the Phoenix Mercury in the Women's National Basketball Association (WNBA).

== Early life ==
Born in Louisville, Kentucky, Harrison learned to play basketball from a young age. In 1989, she was named the Naismith Prep Player of the Year and High School Player of the Year while attending Southern High School, by Parade magazine. She also was named 1989's Kentucky Miss Basketball. In 1991, as a sophomore while attending the University of Tennessee, she was a member of their women's basketball team that won the NCAA Women's Division I Basketball Championship.

== Professional career ==
After graduating from Tennessee in 1993, Lisa played one season (1998–1999) for the Columbus Quest of the American Basketball League and two seasons (1997–1999) for the Portland Power.

In the 1999 WNBA draft, she was selected by the Phoenix Mercury in the third round (34th pick overall). In the WNBA, Lisa was once ranked eighth in free throw shooting accuracy at 86.4% in 2001.

== Outside basketball ==
Harrison was inducted into the Kentucky High School Athletics Hall of Fame on September 10, 2001. On September 12, 2006, Harrison was named an outreach coordinator for the athletic department at the University of Louisville.

In July 2001, she was voted "Sexiest Babe of the WNBA" in a Playboy.com poll.

== Career statistics ==
Legend
GP	Games played	GS	Games started	MPG	Minutes per game	RPG	Rebounds per game
APG	Assists per game	SPG	Steals per game	BPG	Blocks per game	PPG	Points per game
TO	Turnovers per game	FG%	Field-goal percentage	3P%	3-point field-goal percentage	FT%	Free-throw percentage
**Bold**	Career best	°	League leader

=== WNBA career statistics ===
==== Regular season ====
Year	Team	GP	GS	MPG	FG%	3P%	FT%	RPG	APG	SPG	BPG	TO	PPG
1999	Phoenix	32	23	25.9	47.4	10.0	68.2	4.1	**1.7**	0.7	**0.2**	1.1	6.0
2000	Phoenix	31	20	24.2	**52.6**	**66.7**	81.1	3.9	1.2	1.0	0.1	0.7	6.5
2001	Phoenix	32	32	**28.6**	43.0	33.3	86.4	**4.3**	1.6	**1.2**	0.0	1.5	7.7
2002	Phoenix	32	28	28.1	49.6	33.3	**87.0**	3.9	1.3	1.0	0.1	1.4	**8.2**
2003	Phoenix	**33**	**33**	25.4	41.3	0.0	68.6	3.6	1.1	0.9	**0.2**	1.0	5.5
2005	Phoenix	27	2	11.0	44.1	0.0	78.6	1.4	0.4	0.2	0.0	**0.4**	1.5
Career	6 years, 1 team	187	138	24.2	46.6	34.1	77.6	3.6	1.2	0.8	0.1	1.1	6.0

==== Playoffs ====
Year	Team	GP	GS	MPG	FG%	3P%	FT%	RPG	APG	SPG	BPG	TO	PPG
2000	Phoenix	2	2	34.0	70.6	0.0	100.0	5.5	5.0	1.5	0.0	1.5	13.0
Career	1 year, 1 team	2	2	34.0	70.6	0.0	100.0	5.5	5.0	1.5	0.0	1.5	13.0

=== College ===
Year	Team	GP	GS	MPG	FG%	3P%	FT%	RPG	APG	SPG	BPG	TO	PPG
1989–90	Tennessee	33	-	-	46.7	0.0	63.1	4.8	1.5	1.0	0.2	-	7.7
1990–91	Tennessee	**34**	-	-	39.7	0.0	50.8	5.7	2.2	0.9	**0.4**	-	7.6
1991–92	Tennessee	31	-	-	39.3	0.0	**72.7**	5.2	2.1	1.3	**0.4**	-	5.6
1992–93	Tennessee	32	-	-	**46.8**	**33.3**	62.1	**9.4**	**2.6**	**2.0**	0.3	-	**14.0**
**Career**		130	-	-	43.7	14.3	61.0	6.3	2.1	1.3	0.3	-	8.7
Statistics retrieved from Sports-Reference.
