= Brandy Reed =

American basketball player (born 1977)

Personal information
- Born: February 17, 1977 (age 49)
- Listed height: 6 ft 1 in (1.85 m)
- Listed weight: 168 lb (76 kg)

Career information
- High school: Balboa (San Francisco, California)
- College: Southern Miss (1994–1998)
- WNBA draft: 1998: 3rd round, 28th overall pick
- Drafted by: Phoenix Mercury
- Playing career: 1998–2002
- Position: Forward
- Number: 13, 3, 23

Career history
- 1998: Phoenix Mercury
- 1999: Minnesota Lynx
- 2000–2002: Phoenix Mercury

Career highlights
- WNBA All-Star (2000); CUSA Player of the Year (1996); First-team All-CUSA (1996)
- Stats at Basketball Reference

Brandy Carmina Reed (born February 17, 1977) is an American retired professional women's basketball player.

Reed grew up and graduated from Balboa High School in San Francisco, California in 1994. After graduating from The University of Southern Mississippi in 1998, Reed began her professional career with the Phoenix Mercury of the Women's National Basketball Association (WNBA) in 1998. She also played for the Minnesota Lynx after being selected in the 1999 WNBA expansion draft. A year later, the Lynx traded Reed back to the Mercury.

== Career statistics ==
Legend
GP	Games played	GS	Games started	MPG	Minutes per game	RPG	Rebounds per game
APG	Assists per game	SPG	Steals per game	BPG	Blocks per game	PPG	Points per game
TO	Turnovers per game	FG%	Field-goal percentage	3P%	3-point field-goal percentage	FT%	Free-throw percentage
**Bold**	Career best	°	League leader

=== WNBA ===
==== Regular season ====
Year	Team	GP	GS	MPG	FG%	3P%	FT%	RPG	APG	SPG	BPG	TO	PPG
1998	Phoenix	24	0	10.6	**.526**	.250	.710	3.3	0.8	0.8	0.3	1.4	5.2
1999	Minnesota	25	24	30.3	.459	.342	.757	**6.0**	2.6	1.2	**0.7**	2.5	16.1
2000	Phoenix	**32**	**30**	**34.1**	.507	**.419**	.901	5.9	**2.7**	**2.1**	**0.7**	2.8	**19.0**
2001	Phoenix	1	0	13.0	.125	.000	**1.000**	3.0	0.0	0.0	0.0	0.0	3.0
2002	Phoenix	5	4	17.0	.366	.000	.727	0.8	0.8	0.4	0.6	1.6	7.6
Career	5 years, 2 teams	87	58	25.3	.481	.351	.831	4.9	2.0	1.3	0.6	2.2	13.5

==== Playoffs ====
Year	Team	GP	GS	MPG	FG%	3P%	FT%	RPG	APG	SPG	BPG	TO	PPG
1998	Phoenix	**6**	0	10.3	.360	.000	**1.000**	2.8	0.8	**0.3**	0.2	1.0	3.3
2000	Phoenix	2	**2**	**36.5**	**.545**	**.250**	.750	**3.5**	**4.0**	0.0	**0.5**	2.5	**14.0**
Career	2 years, 1 team	8	2	16.9	.447	.200	.833	3.0	1.6	0.3	0.3	1.4	6.0

=== College ===
Year	Team	GP	GS	MPG	FG%	3P%	FT%	RPG	APG	SPG	BPG	TO	PPG
1994–95	Southern Miss	8	-	-	**54.5**	**50.0**	**79.1**	8.8	2.1	**3.6**	0.5	-	19.3
1995–96	Southern Miss	**26**	-	-	50.3	32.3	79.0	11.6	**2.5**	2.6	**1.4**	-	**21.7**
**Career**		34	-	-	51.1	35.4	79.0	10.9	2.4	2.8	1.2	-	21.1
Statistics retrieved from Sports-Reference.
