= Slobodanka Tuvić =

Serbian basketball player (born 1977)

Personal information
- Born: 19 September 1977 (age 49) Mladenovo, SFR Yugoslavia
- Listed height: 1.96 m (6 ft 5 in)
- Listed weight: 88 kg (194 lb)

Career information
- WNBA draft: 1999: undrafted
- Playing career: 1987–2009
- Position: Center

Career history
- 1987–1995: Vojvodina
- 1995–1997: Ergol
- 1997–1999: Hemofarm
- 1999–2002: Pécsi
- 2001–2004: Phoenix Mercury
- 2002–2003: CJM Bourges Basket
- 2003–2004: PF Schio
- 2004–2007: Valenciennes
- 2007–2008: Lotos
- 2008–2009: Wisla Can Pack
- Stats at WNBA.com
- Stats at Basketball Reference

Slobodanka Tuvić, married Maksimović, (Serbian Cyrillic: Слободанка Тувић; born 19 September 1977) is a former Serbian professional basketball player. She played as a center for the WNBA club Phoenix Mercury, and was a member of the Serbia national basketball team.

== Career statistics ==
Legend
GP	Games played	GS	Games started	MPG	Minutes per game	RPG	Rebounds per game
APG	Assists per game	SPG	Steals per game	BPG	Blocks per game	PPG	Points per game
TO	Turnovers per game	FG%	Field-goal percentage	3P%	3-point field-goal percentage	FT%	Free-throw percentage
**Bold**	Career best	°	League leader

=== WNBA ===
WNBA regular season statistics
Year	Team	GP	GS	MPG	FG%	3P%	FT%	RPG	APG	SPG	BPG	TO	PPG
2001	Phoenix	30	0	10.8	.310	—	.475	2.1	0.6	0.5	0.6	**0.9**	1.8
2002	Phoenix	26	1	12.3	**.390**	**.167**	.781	2.4	0.4	0.3	0.3	1.2	3.3
2003	Phoenix	17	14	**21.5**	.388	.000	**.804**	**3.9**	0.7	0.6	0.9	1.9	**7.5**
2004	Phoenix	**33**	**26**	20.9	.374	.000	.708	3.7	**1.0**	**0.8**	**1.1**	1.2	2.8
**Career**	4 years, 1 team	106	41	16.0	.374	.091	.665	3.0	0.7	0.6	0.7	1.2	3.4

== See also ==
- List of Serbian WNBA players
