= Tonya Edwards =

American basketball player and coach (born 1968)

Personal information
- Born: March 13, 1968 (age 58) Flint, Michigan, U.S.
- Listed height: 5 ft 10 in (1.78 m)
- Listed weight: 160 lb (73 kg)

Career information
- High school: Flint Northwestern (Flint, Michigan)
- College: Tennessee (1986–1990)
- WNBA draft: 1999: 1st round, 7th overall pick
- Drafted by: Minnesota Lynx
- Playing career: 1999–2002
- Position: Guard
- Coaching career: 1990–present

Career history

Playing
- 1996–1998: Columbus Quest
- 1999: Minnesota Lynx
- 2000–2001: Phoenix Mercury
- 2001–2002: Charlotte Sting

Coaching
- 1990–1995: Northwestern Community HS
- 2005: Chicago Blaze
- 2006–2008: Detroit (assistant)
- 2008–2015: Alcorn State
- 2016–2018: Los Angeles Sparks (assistant)
- 2021–2023: Chicago Sky (assistant)

Career highlights
- As player: WNBA All-Star (1999); 2× NCAA champion (1987, 1989); NCAA Tournament MOP (1987); First-team All-SEC (1990); SEC All-Freshman Team (1987); As head coach: SWAC coach of the year (2011); As assistant coach: 2× WNBA champion (2016, 2021)
- Stats at Basketball Reference
Medals
Representing the United States
Jones Cup
Gold medal – first place	1987 Taipei	Team competition
Silver medal – second place	1988 Taipei	Team competition

Tonya LaRay Edwards (born March 13, 1968) is an American retired professional basketball player born in Flint, Michigan, who was most recently an assistant coach of the Chicago Sky in the WNBA. She was previously head coach of the Alcorn State Lady Braves basketball team.

== Professional career ==
After graduating from college, there were no opportunities to play professional basketball in the U.S., so Edwards played professionally in Italy from 1991 to 1992, Turkey in 1994, and Israel from 1995 to 1996. In the Autumn of 1996, she played for the Columbus Quest in the American Basketball League (ABL), and won two championship titles with them. In 1998, Edwards became the interim head coach for the Quest after coach Brian Agler resigned. After the ABL folded due to financial difficulties, Edwards was selected by the Minnesota Lynx in the 1999 WNBA draft. She also played for the Phoenix Mercury and Charlotte Sting.

Edwards began her coaching career by returning to her alma mater, Northwestern Community High School in Flint, Michigan, for five seasons (1990–1995). She guided her team to the 1993 state championship with perfect 28–0 record, a 1992 state champion runner-up finish, and compiled a 78-23 overall record (.772). She was named 1993 "High School Coach of the Year" in the state of Michigan.

In 2004, she became a radio commentator for the Phoenix Mercury games, and later became an assistant coach in the National Women's Basketball League.

In 2006, she was inducted to the Greater Flint Afro-American Hall of Fame. That same year, she was named as an assistant coach to the women's basketball team at University of Detroit Mercy.

After two years at Detroit, Edwards was head coach at Alcorn State from 2008 to 2015. Edwards was SWAC Coach of the Year in 2011 and led Alcorn State to the SWAC Championship Game in 2012. In seven seasons, Edwards went 60–147 at Alcorn State. On March 23, 2015, Alcorn State announced it would not extend Edwards' contract, which expired at the end of the month.

== Career statistics ==
Legend
GP	Games played	GS	Games started	MPG	Minutes per game	RPG	Rebounds per game
APG	Assists per game	SPG	Steals per game	BPG	Blocks per game	PPG	Points per game
TO	Turnovers per game	FG%	Field-goal percentage	3P%	3-point field-goal percentage	FT%	Free-throw percentage
**Bold**	Career best	°	League leader

=== WNBA ===
==== Regular season ====
Year	Team	GP	GS	MPG	FG%	3P%	FT%	RPG	APG	SPG	BPG	TO	PPG
1999	Minnesota	**32**	**32**	**32.2**	.357	**.344**	**.806**	**3.5**	**2.6**	0.8	**0.4**	2.1	**14.8**
2000	Phoenix	**32**	**32**	28.9	**.376**	.307	.782	2.4	1.8	**1.1**	0.3	2.0	10.6
2001	Phoenix	10	9	20.8	.366	.357	.787	1.9	1.8	0.5	0.1	2.2	9.4
2001	Charlotte	22	0	16.9	.340	.227	.730	2.0	1.4	0.6	0.3	1.8	4.5
2002	Charlotte	29	0	10.4	.364	.280	.717	1.4	0.8	0.6	0.1	0.6	3.9
Career	4 years, 3 teams	125	73	22.7	.362	.322	.775	2.3	1.7	0.8	0.2	1.7	9.0

==== Playoffs ====
Year	Team	GP	GS	MPG	FG%	3P%	FT%	RPG	APG	SPG	BPG	TO	PPG
2000	Phoenix	2	**2**	**30.5**	.250	.231	.667	**3.0**	**2.5**	**2.0**	0.0	1.0	**8.5**
2001	Charlotte	**8**	0	14.9	**.429**	**.500**	**1.000**	2.0	1.5	0.6	0.0	1.4	2.8
2002	Charlotte	2	0	9.5	.200	.333	.000	0.5	0.5	0.0	0.0	0.5	1.5
Career	3 years, 2 teams	12	2	16.6	.326	.300	.600	1.9	1.5	0.8	0.0	1.2	3.5

=== College ===
Year	Team	GP	GS	MPG	FG%	3P%	FT%	RPG	APG	SPG	BPG	TO	PPG
1987–88	Tennessee	**34**	-	-	**45.8**	**50.0**	75.2	**4.9**	3.3	**2.3**	**0.3**	-	**12.9**
1988–89	Tennessee	20	-	-	45.0	11.1	**79.7**	3.0	**3.4**	**2.3**	0.2	-	9.7
1989–90	Tennessee	33	-	-	41.9	36.8	76.1	3.2	**3.4**	1.7	0.1	-	11.3
**Career**		87	-	-	44.2	36.1	76.4	3.8	3.3	2.1	0.2	-	11.6
Statistics retrieved from Sports-Reference.

== USA Basketball ==
Edwards was named to the team representing the US at the 1987 William Jones Cup competition in Taipei, Taiwan. The team won all seven games to win the gold medal for the event. The USA was down at halftime in the opening game against Japan, but came back in the second half to win, helped by 15 points from Campbell. Edwards was the second leading scorer on the team, averaging 12.4 points per game over the seven games. She was one of three players from the USA team to be named to the Jones Cup All-Tournament Team.

In the following year, 1988, Edwards was also named to the Jones Cup team. The USA team was not as successful, with a 3–2 record, but that was enough to secure the silver medal. Edwards was the leading scorer on the team, averaging 15.4 points per game, and tied for the team lead in steals with 15.

== Head coaching record ==
Edwards's head coaching record is as follows:

Record table
Season	Team	Overall	Conference	Standing	Postseason
Alcorn State Lady Braves (Southwestern Athletic Conference) (2008–2015)
2008–09	Alcorn State	5–26	4–14	10th	
2009–10	Alcorn State	8–20	8–10	T–6th	
2010–11	Alcorn State	13–15	12–6	3rd	
2011–12	Alcorn State	14–20	9–9	7th	
2012–13	Alcorn State	2–26	2–16	10th	
2013–14	Alcorn State	8–22	7–11	T–7th	
2014–15	Alcorn State	10–18	9–9	6th	
Alcorn State:		60–147	51–75		
Total:		60–147			

== Sources ==
- WNBA Player Profile
- September 11, 2006 press release on Edwards joining the University of Detroit Mercy coaching staff
- Profile from the Greater Flint Afro-American Hall of Fame
