= 2004 Phoenix Mercury season =

- Head coach: Carrie Graf
- Arena: America West Arena

Results
- Record: 17–17 (.500)
- Place: 5th (Western)
- Playoff finish: Did not qualify

The 2004 WNBA season was the eighth for the Phoenix Mercury.

== Offseason ==
=== WNBA draft ===
Pick	Player	Nationality	School
1st	Diana Taurasi		
8th	Chandi Jones		
14th	Ashley Robinson		
27th	Maria Villarroel		

== Regular season ==
In her WNBA debut, Taurasi netted 26 points and led the Mercury to an 84-76 victory over the Seattle Storm. For the season, the rookie averaged 17.0 points, 4.4 rebounds and 3.9 assists per game. Although the Mercury did not qualify for the playoffs, the season was a personal success as Taurasi was named to the Western Conference All Star team and won the WNBA Rookie of the Year Award.

=== Season standings ===
Western Conference	W	L	PCT	GB	Home	Road	Conf.
Los Angeles Sparks ^{x}	25	9	.735	–	15–2	10–7	16–6
Seattle Storm ^{x}	20	14	.588	5.0	13–4	7–10	13–9
Minnesota Lynx ^{x}	18	16	.529	7.0	11–6	7–10	12–10
Sacramento Monarchs ^{x}	18	16	.529	7.0	10–7	8–9	12–10
Phoenix Mercury ^{o}	17	17	.500	8.0	10–7	7–10	11–11
Houston Comets ^{o}	13	21	.382	12.0	9–8	4–13	7–15
San Antonio Silver Stars ^{o}	9	25	.265	16.0	6–11	3–14	6–16

=== Season schedule ===
Date	Opponent	Score	Result	Record
May 20	Sacramento	66-72	Loss	0-1
May 22	@ Connecticut	65-58	Win	1-1
May 28	Seattle	84-76	Win	2-1
June 1	Houston	73-63	Win	3-1
June 3	@ Seattle	45-72	Loss	3-2
June 5	@ Minnesota	68-76	Loss	3-3
June 9	Connecticut	75-59	Win	4-3
June 11	Charlotte	51-59	Loss	4-4
June 18	Los Angeles	74-76	Loss	4-5
June 22	Minnesota	69-46	Win	5-5
June 24	New York	72-60	Win	6-5
June 26	San Antonio	72-80 (OT)	Loss	6-6
June 27	@ Sacramento	57-63	Loss	6-7
June 29	@ San Antonio	77-65	Win	7-7
July 1	@ Charlotte	71-59	Win	8-7
July 3	@ Indiana	60-61	Loss	8-8
July 7	@ Los Angeles	71-73	Loss	8-9
July 9	@ Minnesota	59-61	Loss	8-10
July 11	@ New York	69-77	Loss	8-11
July 18	Minnesota	60-63	Loss	8-12
July 21	San Antonio	87-55	Win	9-12
July 22	@ Sacramento	71-69	Win	10-12
July 24	Indiana	71-56	Win	11-12
July 30	@ San Antonio	68-59	Win	12-12
August 1	@ Washington	62-82	Loss	12-13
September 1	@ Detroit	63-58	Win	13-13
September 3	@ Houston	70-60	Win	14-13
September 4	Seattle	63-55	Win	15-13
September 8	Los Angeles	72-58	Win	16-13
September 11	Detroit	72-80	Loss	16-14
September 14	@ Los Angeles	60-73	Loss	16-15
September 15	@ Seattle	58-73	Loss	16-16
September 17	Washington	67-74	Loss	16-17
September 19	Houston	78-64	Win	17-17

== Player stats ==
Note: GP= Games played; FG = Field Goals; MIN= Minutes; REB= Rebounds; AST= Assists; STL = Steals; BLK = Blocks; PTS = Points

Player	GP	MIN	FG	REB	AST	STL	BLK	PTS
Diana Taurasi	34	1130	209	149	132	43	25	578
Anna DeForge	34	1152	165	123	107	51	8	488
Penny Taylor	33	1076	150	160	82	52	14	434
Plenette Pierson	31	803	112	131	26	26	17	290
Slobodanka Tuvic	33	691	37	123	32	25	37	91
Tamara Moore	32	387	27	28	53	26	9	82
Nikki McCray	27	371	30	29	13	7	0	69
Adrian Williams	11	145	27	21	5	11	5	65
Shereka Wright	24	243	13	27	8	3	1	57
Gwen Jackson	14	136	23	27	4	3	1	56
Kayte Christensen	32	407	19	69	23	21	7	50
Jae Kingi-Cross	13	128	6	13	12	5	2	20
Ashley Robinson	19	130	7	13	2	8	10	17
Lindsay Taylor	5	26	1	3	2	1	1	3

== Awards and honors ==
- Diana Taurasi, WNBA Rookie of the Year Award
