= Nicole Kubik =

American basketball player (born 1978)

Personal information
- Born: March 1, 1978 (age 48)
- Listed height: 5 ft 9 in (1.75 m)
- Listed weight: 145 lb (66 kg)

Career information
- College: Nebraska
- WNBA draft: 2000: 1st round, 15th overall pick
- Drafted by: Los Angeles Sparks
- Position: Guard
- Number: 10

Career history
- 2000–2001: Phoenix Mercury

Career highlights
- First-team All-Big 12 (2000)
- Stats at Basketball Reference

Nicole Kubik (born March 1, 1978) is a former professional basketball player. She was the 15th pick in the 2000 WNBA draft.

== High school ==
Kubik was the third-leading scorer in Cambridge High School history. She helped lead the school to an 81-game winning streak.

== Nebraska statistics ==
Legend
GP	Games played	GS	Games started	MPG	Minutes per game
FG%	Field goal percentage	3P%	3-point field goal percentage	FT%	Free throw percentage
RPG	Rebounds per game	APG	Assists per game	SPG	Steals per game
BPG	Blocks per game	PPG	Points per game	**Bold**	Career high

Year	Team	GP	Points	FG%	3P%	FT%	RPG	PPG
1996–97	Nebraska	28	238	.366	.293	.716	2.8	8.5
1997–98	Nebraska	**33**	437	.417	**.303**	.702	3.3	13.2
1998–99	Nebraska	**33**	**654**	.412	.267	.770	3.8	**19.8**
1999-00	Nebraska	31	538	**.432**	.296	**.788**	**4.5**	17.4
Career		125	1867	.413	.289	.751	3.6	14.9

== WNBA stats ==
Year	Tm	G	GS	MP	FG	FGA	FG%	3P	3PA	3P%	2P	2PA	2P%	FT	FTA	FT%	ORB	DRB	TRB	AST	STL	BLK	TOV	PF	PTS
2000	PHO	4	0	4.8	0.3	0.8	.333	0.0	0.3	.000	0.3	0.5	.500	1.0	1.0	1.000	0.0	0.5	0.5	0.5	0.0	0.0	0.8	1.0	1.5
2001	PHO	3	0	7.0	0.3	1.3	.250	0.0	0.3	.000	0.3	1.0	.333	0.0	0.0	0.0	0.7	0.7	1.7	1.3	0.0	1.0	2.3	0.7	
