= 2005 Phoenix Mercury season =

- Head coach: Carrie Graf
- Arena: America West Arena

Results
- Record: 16–18 (.471)
- Place: 5th (Western)
- Playoff finish: Did not qualify

The 2005 WNBA season was the ninth for the Phoenix Mercury. The team missed the playoffs for the fifth consecutive season, falling a game short.

== Offseason ==
=== WNBA draft ===
| Round | Pick | Player | Nationality | School/Club team |
| 1 | 3 | Sandora Irvin (F) | United States | TCU |
| 2 | 18 | Angelina Williams (F) | United States | Illinois |
| 3 | 31 | Jamie Carey (G) | United States | Texas |

== Regular season ==
=== Season standings ===
| Western Conference | W | L | PCT | GB | Home | Road | Conf. |
|---|---|---|---|---|---|---|---|
| Sacramento Monarchs ^{x} | 25 | 9 | .735 | – | 15–2 | 10–7 | 17–5 |
| Seattle Storm ^{x} | 20 | 14 | .588 | 5.0 | 14–3 | 6–11 | 13–9 |
| Houston Comets ^{x} | 19 | 15 | .559 | 6.0 | 11–6 | 8–9 | 11–11 |
| Los Angeles Sparks ^{x} | 17 | 17 | .500 | 8.0 | 11–6 | 6–11 | 12–10 |
| Phoenix Mercury ^{o} | 16 | 18 | .471 | 9.0 | 11–6 | 5–12 | 12–10 |
| Minnesota Lynx ^{o} | 14 | 20 | .412 | 11.0 | 11–6 | 3–14 | 9–13 |
| San Antonio Silver Stars ^{o} | 7 | 27 | .206 | 18.0 | 5–12 | 2–15 | 3–19 |

=== Season schedule ===
| Date | Opponent | Score | Result | Record |
| May 21 | Sacramento | 72-77 | Loss | 0-1 |
| May 24 | @ Indiana | 76-83 | Loss | 0-2 |
| May 26 | @ Charlotte | 68-58 | Win | 1-2 |
| May 28 | @ Connecticut | 68-85 | Loss | 1-3 |
| June 2 | Seattle | 67-78 | Loss | 1-4 |
| June 4 | @ Houston | 57-59 | Loss | 1-5 |
| June 8 | @ Los Angeles | 66-63 | Win | 2-5 |
| June 10 | @ Sacramento | 61-73 | Loss | 2-6 |
| June 15 | San Antonio | 76-62 | Win | 3-6 |
| June 18 | @ New York | 54-65 | Loss | 3-7 |
| June 21 | @ Washington | 56-77 | Loss | 3-8 |
| June 22 | @ Minnesota | 59-75 | Loss | 3-9 |
| June 25 | Connecticut | 69-77 | Loss | 3-10 |
| July 2 | @ Los Angeles | 63-86 | Loss | 3-11 |
| July 5 | @ San Antonio | 76-69 | Win | 4-11 |
| July 6 | Seattle | 73-61 | Win | 5-11 |
| July 13 | Charlotte | 82-62 | Win | 6-11 |
| July 15 | Washington | 77-66 | Win | 7-11 |
| July 21 | New York | 70-80 | Loss | 7-12 |
| July 23 | @ San Antonio | 66-49 | Win | 8-12 |
| July 26 | Los Angeles | 77-60 | Win | 9-12 |
| July 29 | @ Minnesota | 69-65 | Win | 10-12 |
| July 31 | @ Detroit | 63-66 | Loss | 10-13 |
| August 3 | Minnesota | 70-64 | Win | 11-13 |
| August 5 | Houston | 80-75 | Win | 12-13 |
| August 12 | Sacramento | 76-62 | Win | 13-13 |
| August 14 | Indiana | 56-62 | Loss | 13-14 |
| August 16 | Detroit | 58-51 | Win | 14-14 |
| August 18 | @ Houston | 66-77 | Loss | 14-15 |
| August 19 | San Antonio | 91-57 | Win | 15-15 |
| August 21 | Minnesota | 83-69 | Win | 16-15 |
| August 23 | @ Sacramento | 70-76 | Loss | 16-16 |
| August 25 | Houston | 72-80 | Loss | 16-17 |
| August 27 | @ Seattle | 74-85 | Loss | 16-18 |

== Player stats ==
| Player | GP | REB | AST | STL | BLK | PTS |
| Diana Taurasi | 33 | 138 | 150 | 38 | 28 | 527 |
| Anna DeForge | 33 | 114 | 80 | 41 | 7 | 433 |
| Penny Taylor | 29 | 120 | 94 | 38 | 11 | 382 |
| Kamila Vodichkova | 28 | 196 | 63 | 28 | 22 | 305 |
| Maria Stepanova | 15 | 80 | 23 | 20 | 38 | 162 |
| Ashley Robinson | 34 | 118 | 31 | 20 | 34 | 103 |
| Shereka Wright | 25 | 50 | 23 | 14 | 3 | 94 |
| Plenette Pierson | 12 | 59 | 13 | 10 | 13 | 92 |
| Belinda Snell | 20 | 36 | 18 | 7 | 1 | 65 |
| Sandora Irvin | 12 | 34 | 5 | 5 | 6 | 44 |
| Lisa Harrison | 27 | 39 | 10 | 5 | 1 | 41 |
| Angelina Williams | 16 | 23 | 9 | 4 | 7 | 40 |
| Gwen Jackson | 11 | 23 | 3 | 0 | 3 | 31 |
| Niele Ivey | 14 | 10 | 20 | 6 | 0 | 24 |
| Kayte Christensen | 11 | 22 | 7 | 7 | 5 | 18 |
