= Phoenix Mercury =

Women's National Basketball Association team in Phoenix, Arizona

- 2026 Phoenix Mercury season
- Conference: Western
- Leagues: WNBA
- Founded: 1997
- History: Phoenix Mercury; 1997–present
- Arena: Mortgage Matchup Center
- Location: Phoenix, Arizona
- Team colors: Purple, orange, psychic purple, black, white
- Main sponsor: Fry's Food and Drug
- General manager: Nick U'Ren
- Head coach: Nate Tibbetts
- Assistants: Kristi Toliver; Megan Vogel; Michael Joiner
- Ownership: Mat Ishbia
- Championships: 3 (2007, 2009, 2014)
- Conference titles: 4 (1998, 2007, 2009, 2014) (Note: The WNBA awarded conference championships to the winners of the Conference Finals in the playoffs from 1998 to 2015.)
- Website: mercury.wnba.com

The Phoenix Mercury are an American professional basketball team based in Phoenix, Arizona. The Mercury compete in the Women's National Basketball Association (WNBA) as a member of the Western Conference. One of eight original franchises, it was founded before the league's inaugural 1997 season began. The team plays their home games at Mortgage Matchup Center.

The Mercury have qualified for the WNBA Playoffs in eighteen of its twenty-eight years in Phoenix. In 1998, 2007, 2009, 2014, 2021, and 2025 the Mercury went to the WNBA Finals; they lost to Houston in 1998, Chicago in 2021, and Las Vegas in 2025, but won the title in 2007, 2009, and 2014 over Detroit, Indiana, and Chicago respectively.

The franchise has been home to players such as Diana Taurasi, Cappie Pondexter, Candice Dupree, Brittney Griner, and Penny Taylor.

In February 2023, Mat Ishbia, a former Michigan State college basketball player, completed the acquisition of Phoenix Mercury from Robert Sarver. The team was among Sarver's several sports assets located in Arizona purchased by Ishbia.

== History ==
=== Mercury heating up (1997–1998) ===
The club's original logo, used from 1997–2025.

With a cast that included hall-of-famer Nancy Lieberman, and future hall-of-famers Michele Timms of Australia, and Jennifer Gillom, hyper-active star Bridget Pettis, and outspoken coach Cheryl Miller, the Mercury quickly established itself as a major franchise. In the first WNBA season, the Mercury posted a 16–12 record and reached the first WNBA playoffs. The Mercury lost to the New York Liberty, though, in those playoffs.

In 1998, the Mercury again qualified for the playoffs, posting a 19–11 record. The Mercury defeated the Cleveland Rockers to reach the WNBA Finals for the first time. In a hard-fought series, the Mercury fell 2 games to 1 to the defending champion Houston Comets.

=== Mercury in retrograde (1999–2003) ===
In 1999, the Mercury missed the playoffs, posting a 15–17 record. In 2000, the Mercury finished 20–12, but got swept by the Los Angeles Sparks. The team descended into turmoil after the season, as coach Miller left and the original core group of players broke up, via retirement or trades, and the team stopped being a playoff contender.

From 2001 to 2004, the Mercury were at the bottom of the WNBA. Fielding miserable teams, the Mercury were never competitive. The Mercury went through coach after coach, and nothing worked. During the lean years, the franchise remained in the news as forward Lisa Harrison would become a sex symbol. Playboy Magazine offered her money to pose in their magazine. She would decline the offer.

=== Diana Taurasi joins the WNBA (2004–2005) ===
After a horrible 2003 season, in which the Mercury posted an 8–26 record, the Mercury won the #1 overall choice in the 2004 WNBA Draft, and select coveted former UConn star Diana Taurasi. Taurasi went on to win the WNBA Rookie of the Year Award in the 2004 season, as the Mercury posted a better 17–17 record. The Mercury posted a 16–18 record in 2005, missing the playoffs again.

=== Bringing back "Paul Ball" (2006–2007) ===
Former NBA coach Paul Westhead became the Mercury's head coach prior to the 2006 season and brought his up-tempo style to Phoenix. Westhead was the first WNBA coach to have won a previous NBA championship (with Los Angeles Lakers in 1980). The Mercury also drafted Cappie Pondexter with the #2 overall selection in the 2006 WNBA Draft. The addition provided Taurasi with a solid #2 player. Westhead's run and gun offense quickly became The Mercury's trademark and the franchise would soon set new league records for points scored.

The 2006 season was a positive one for the Mercury, as they posted a winning record for the first time since 2000, at 18–16. The Mercury competed for the playoffs all year, but fell just short of a postseason berth.

As the 2007 season came, the Mercury were poised and hungry for a deep playoff run. The Mercury would run away with the Western Conference, posting their best record in franchise history at 23–11, as well as clinching the #1 seed. The Mercury set a record by averaging 89.0 points in a season during 2007. In their first playoffs since 2000, the Mercury made quick work of the Seattle Storm in the first round, blowing them out in two games (Game 1: 101–84, Game 2: 95–89). In the Western Finals, the Mercury swept the San Antonio Silver Stars in a closer series (Game 1: 102–100, Game 2: 98–92), advancing to the WNBA Finals for the first time in nine years. In the Finals, the Mercury faced the defending 2006 champions Detroit Shock. The two teams split the first two games in Detroit. Coming back home, the Mercury suffered a letdown in game 3, losing 88–83. Down 2–1, the Mercury had to win game 4 or lose. Game 4 came down to the final seconds, but the Mercury edged out the Shock 77–76, with Cappie Pondexter scoring 26 points, and forced a Game 5 in Detroit. In Game 5, Phoenix won by a score of 108–92. Penny Taylor scored a game high 30 points in Game 5, and went 18-for-18 from the line. The Mercury won the series and their first championship with a 108–92 Game 5 victory, becoming the first WNBA team to win a championship on the road. Cappie Pondexter was named the WNBA Finals MVP, and averaged 22.0 points and 5.6 assists in the series. On November 7, 2007, The Mercury announced the hiring of Corey Gaines as head coach to replace the departing Paul Westhead.

=== Mercury fall, Mercury rise (2008–2011) ===
In 2008, the Mercury finished the season with a record of 16–18. As a result, they became the first team in WNBA history to fail to qualify for the playoffs after winning the WNBA Finals the year before.

In June 2009, the Mercury and WNBA announced a sponsorship agreement with identity theft protection service LifeLock to place that company's logo on their jerseys through the 2013 season, making the Mercury among the first non-soccer franchises in the major leagues of North America to place a company logo on their uniforms.

However, a year later, the Mercury were back to what they were two years before. The Mercury clinched the top spot in the playoffs along with the number one seed in the Western Conference. The Mercury defeated the 2008 conference champion San Antonio Silver Stars in the first round, winning the very exciting series 2–1 after losing the first game on the road. The Mercury then defeated the Los Angeles Sparks in the conference finals, winning 2–1 in a series that ended Lisa Leslie's career. The Mercury then went on to beat the Indiana Fever 3–2 in the best of 5 series to capture the second title in their franchise history. Diana Taurasi captured the WNBA Finals MVP Award. All-star guard Cappie Pondexter was traded to the New York Liberty amid some controversy in the offseason; All-Star Candice Dupree joined the duo of Taurasi and Penny Taylor as the Mercury looked to repeat in 2010.

It was not easy, however, as the Mercury faced a few bad losing streaks throughout the 2010 season. The team managed to finish 15–19, good for second place in the Western Conference. Phoenix swept San Antonio in the first round of the Playoffs, but lost to the eventual champion Seattle Storm in the conference finals.

After a hectic offseason for Diana Taurasi, most of the Mercury team was rested and ready to play. The team started the 2011 season with a surprising 0–3 record, but flew back into playoff contention, entering the All-Star break with a 10–5 record. Ultimately, they recovered to gain the third seed in the 2011 WNBA Playoffs, and upset the Seattle Storm in the opening round, closing an 18-point deficit to win on Seattle's home floor, allowing the Mercury to reach its third straight conference finals. Unfortunately, for the team, they came up short against the top-seeded Minnesota Lynx, losing in two games.

=== Brittney Griner arrives (2013–2019) ===
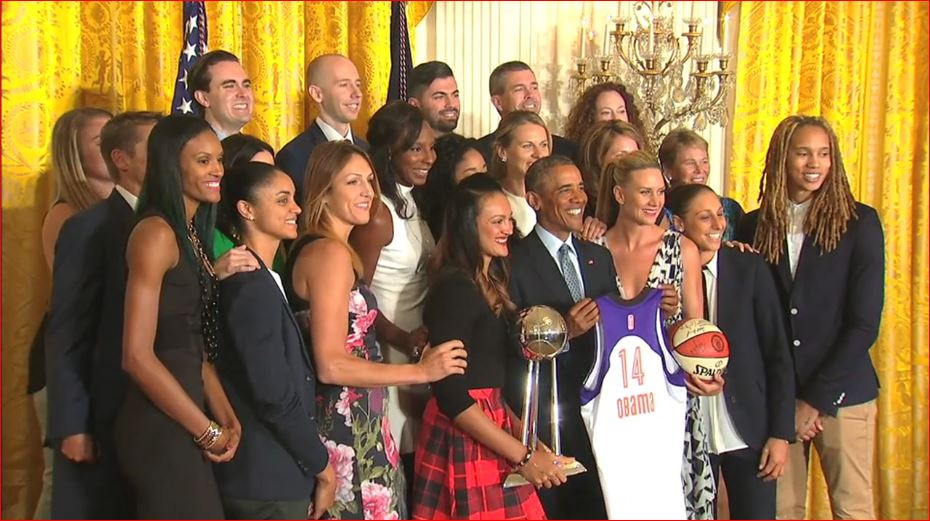
Phoenix Mercury at the White House to honor 2014 Championship

Coming off the 2012 WNBA season in which the Phoenix Mercury franchise finished with the second worst record in the WNBA, a 7–27 mark, Phoenix received the 2013 WNBA draft lottery and secured the top overall pick. Once the 2013 WNBA draft arrived in April 2013, the Mercury used the top overall pick on two time Women's College Basketball Wooden award winner Brittney Griner. However, the Mercury lost to the Lynx in the Conference round of the playoffs.

Starting in the 2014 season, the Mercury wore jerseys sponsored by Casino Arizona and Talking Stick Resort. That year the Mercury were under the guidance of new coach Sandy Brondello went on to set an all time WNBA record for wins in a season, with 29, and breezed through the 2014 playoffs to claim their 3rd WNBA Championship.

On February 3, 2015, Diana Taurasi announced that she would sit out the 2015 WNBA season at the request of her Russian Premier League team, UMMC Ekaterinburg. The team offered Taurasi to pay her more than her WNBA salary to skip the 2015 WNBA season. For the 2014 WNBA season, Taurasi made just under the league maximum of $107,000. But she makes 15 times that - approximately $1.5 million - playing overseas.

In 2016, the WNBA switched to a playoff format involving single elimination games in the first two rounds. The eighth-seeded Mercury upset the Indiana Fever in the First Round and New York Liberty in the Second Round to reach the Semifinals. However, they lost the Semifinals to the Minnesota Lynx.

In 2017, the Mercury once again sailed through the first two rounds of the playoffs, winning their games against the Seattle Storm and Connecticut Sun. Again, they lost in the Semifinals, this time to the Los Angeles Sparks.

2018 saw the Mercury win both single-elimination playoff games for the third year in a row with victories against the Dallas Wings and Connecticut Sun, giving Diana Taurasi a 13–0 record in winner-take-all elimination games in her career. In the semifinals, the Mercury came up short against the Seattle Storm in the decisive fifth game, giving Taurasi her first ever loss in a winner-take-all elimination game.

The Mercury had to play most of the 2019 season without Taurasi, who was struggling with back and hamstring injuries. The Mercury barely made the playoffs as the number eight seed with a 15–19 record and were eliminated in the first-round elimination game 105–76 by the Chicago Sky.

=== A new big three (2020–2021) ===
Before the 2020 season, the Mercury traded Bonner to the Sun for draft picks, which they then used to acquire Skylar Diggins. The season was played in the Wubble and Griner left after 12 games due to personal reasons. Without her, the Mercury finished 13–9 as the number 5 seed and made it to the second round of the playoffs, where they lost to the Lynx.

During the 2021 season, Taurasi once again struggled with injuries, playing in only 16 games. The Mercury finished with a 19–13 record. After defeating the Liberty, Storm, and Aces, the fifth-seeded Mercury advanced to the finals to face the sixth-seeded Chicago Sky. This was only the second time in WNBA history that neither of the best two teams by record made it to the WNBA finals (the other being 2006). This was also the Mercury’s first appearance in the finals since 2014. They lost the series 1–3 to the Sky. After the season, the Mercury did not renew Brondello's contract.

=== Struggles in final Taurasi years (2022–2024) ===
In January 2022, Vanessa Nygaard was named the new head coach. The Mercury signed Tina Charles, the leading scorer of the 2021 season, in free agency. However, in February, Griner was detained in Russia and missed the enitre 2022 season. The Mercury's season was marred by other issues, including an on-court altercation between Diggins and Taurasi early in the season, and Charles leaving the team after 18 games. They made the playoffs as the eighth seed with a 15–21 record. However, playing without both Diggins and Taurasi, they were swept in the first round by the Aces.

Griner returned for the 2023 season, but Diggins skipped the season due to maternity leave. The Mercury started the season 2–10 and fired Nygaard. Nikki Blue became the interim head coach and finished the season, but the Mercury ended last in the league with a 9–31 record, missing the playoffs for the first time since 2012. In October, Nate Tibbetts was named the new head coach. In December, the Mercury were awarded the third overall pick in the 2024 WNBA draft lottery.

Before the 2024 season, Diggins left in free agency, and the Mercury traded the third overall pick along with other assets to acquire Kahleah Copper. The Mercury once again struggled to stay healthy, with their projected starting lineup only playing 11 games together. They finished with a 19–21 record and made the playoffs as the seventh seed, where they were swept in the first round by the Lynx.

=== Alyssa Thomas era (2025–present) ===
Before the 2025 season, Taurasi announced her retirement, and Griner left in free agency. In a big four-team trade, the Mercury acquired Alyssa Thomas and Satou Sabally.

== Season-by-season records ==
Season	Team	Conference		Regular season			Playoff Results	Head coach
Season	Team	Conference		W	L	PCT	Playoff Results	Head coach
Phoenix Mercury
1997	1997	West	1st	16	12	.571	Lost WNBA Semifinals (New York, 0–1)	Cheryl Miller
1998	1998	West	2nd	19	11	.633	Won WNBA Semifinals (Cleveland, 2–1); Lost WNBA Finals (Houston, 1–2)	Cheryl Miller
1999	1999	West	4th	15	17	.469	Did not qualify	Cheryl Miller
2000	2000	West	4th	20	12	.625	Lost Conference Semifinals (Los Angeles, 0–2)	Cheryl Miller
2001	2001	West	5th	13	19	.406	Did not qualify	Cynthia Cooper
2002	2002	West	7th	11	21	.344	Did not qualify	C. Cooper (6–4); L. Sharp (5–17)
2003	2003	West	7th	8	26	.235	Did not qualify	John Shumate
2004	2004	West	5th	17	17	.500	Did not qualify	Carrie Graf
2005	2005	West	5th	16	18	.471	Did not qualify	Carrie Graf
2006	2006	West	5th	18	16	.529	Did not qualify	Paul Westhead
2007	2007	West	1st	23	11	.676	Won Conference Semifinals (Seattle, 2–0); Won Conference Finals (San Antonio, 2–0); Won WNBA Finals (Detroit, 3–2)	Paul Westhead
2008	2008	West	7th	16	18	.471	Did not qualify	Corey Gaines
2009	2009	West	1st	23	11	.676	Won Conference Semifinals (San Antonio, 2–1); Won Conference Finals (Los Angeles, 2–1); Won WNBA Finals (Indiana, 3–2)	Corey Gaines
2010	2010	West	2nd	15	19	.441	Won Conference Semifinals (San Antonio, 2–0); Lost Conference Finals (Seattle, 0–2)	Corey Gaines
2011	2011	West	3rd	19	15	.559	Won Conference Semifinals (Seattle, 2–1); Lost Conference Finals (Minnesota, 0–2)	Corey Gaines
2012	2012	West	6th	7	27	.206	Did not qualify	Corey Gaines
2013	2013	West	3rd	19	15	.559	Won Conference Semifinals (Los Angeles, 2–1); Lost Conference Finals (Minnesota, 0–2)	Corey Gaines (10–11); Russ Pennell (9–4)
2014	2014	West	1st	29	5	.853	Won Conference Semifinals (Los Angeles, 2–0); Won Conference Finals (Minnesota, 2–1); Won WNBA Finals (Chicago, 3–0)	Sandy Brondello
2015	2015	West	2nd	20	14	.588	Won Conference Semifinals (Tulsa, 2–0); Lost Conference Finals (Minnesota, 0–2)	Sandy Brondello
2016	2016	West	4th	16	18	.471	Won First Round (Indiana, 1–0); Won Second Round (New York, 1–0); Lost WNBA Semifinals (Minnesota, 0–3)	Sandy Brondello
2017	2017	West	3rd	18	16	.529	Won First Round (Seattle, 1–0); Won Second Round (Connecticut, 1–0); Lost WNBA Semifinals (Los Angeles, 0–3)	Sandy Brondello
2018	2018	West	2nd	20	14	.588	Won First Round (Dallas, 1–0); Won Second Round (Connecticut, 1–0); Lost WNBA Semifinals (Seattle, 2–3)	Sandy Brondello
2019	2019	West	5th	15	19	.441	Lost First Round (Chicago, 0–1)	Sandy Brondello
2020	2020	West	5th	13	9	.591	Won First Round (Washington, 1–0); Lost Second Round (Minnesota, 0–1)	Sandy Brondello
2021	2021	West	4th	19	13	.594	Won First Round (New York, 1–0); Won Second Round (Seattle, 1–0); Won WNBA Semifinals (Las Vegas 3–2); Lost WNBA Finals (Chicago 1–3)	Sandy Brondello
2022	2022	West	4th	15	21	.417	Lost First Round (Las Vegas 0–2)	Vanessa Nygaard
2023	2023	West	6th	9	31	.225	Did not qualify	Vanessa Nygaard (2–10); Nikki Blue (7–21)
2024	2024	West	4th	19	21	.475	Lost First Round (Minnesota 0–2)	Nate Tibbetts
2025	2025	West	3rd	27	17	.614	Won First Round (New York, 2–1); Won Semifinals (Minnesota, 3–1); Lost WNBA Finals (Las Vegas, 0–4)	Nate Tibbetts
2026	2026	West	6th	16	28	.364	Did not qualify	Nate Tibbetts
Regular season				511	511	.500	5 Conference Championships	
Playoffs				52	49	.515	3 WNBA Championships	

== Players ==
=== Roster ===
Phoenix Mercury roster
Players
Coaches

Pos.	No.	Nat.	Name	Height	Weight	DOB	From	Yrs
F	11	(France)	Ayayi, Valériane	6' 1" (1.85m)		1994-04-29	France	1
G/F	1	(France)	Brochant, Noémie	5' 11" (1.8m)		1999-10-25	France	R
G	5	(United States)	Ciezki, Shay	5' 7" (1.7m)		2003-11-26	Indiana	R
G/F	2	(United States)	Copper, Kahleah	6' 1" (1.85m)	165 lb (75kg)	1994-08-28	Rutgers	9
G	12	(United States)	Dunn, Kara	5' 11" (1.8m)		2003-12-06	USC	R
G	10	(United States)	Held, Lexi	5' 10" (1.78m)	150 lb (68kg)	1999-12-28	DePaul	1
C	31	(Belgium)	Linskens, Kyara	6' 4" (1.93m)	209 lb (95kg)	1996-11-13	Belgium	1
F	4	(United States)	Mack, Natasha	6' 4" (1.93m)	182 lb (83kg)	1997-11-03	Oklahoma State	2
G	0	(United States)	Plum, Kelsey	5' 8" (1.73m)	145 lb (66kg)	1994-08-24	Washington	7
F	6	(United States)	Poffenbarger, Saylor	6' 2" (1.88m)	189 lb (86kg)	2002-04-14	Maryland	R
F	77	(Spain)	Suárez, Marta	6' 3" (1.91m)		2002-05-07	TCU	R
F	25	(United States)	Thomas, Alyssa	6' 2" (1.88m)	203 lb (92kg)	1992-04-12	Maryland	12
F	21	(United States)	Westbeld, Maddy	6' 3" (1.91m)		2002-02-10	Notre Dame	1
G	33	(Australia)	Whitcomb, Sami	5' 10" (1.78m)	149 lb (68kg)	1988-07-20	Washington	8
G	—	(Sweden)	Holm, Klara (S)	5' 8" (1.73m)		1999-08-28	Sweden	–
G	29	(Serbia)	Nogić, Jovana (S)	6' 0" (1.83m)	170 lb (77kg)	1997-12-17	Serbia	R
G	–	(Spain)	Pueyo, Helena (S)	6' 0" (1.83m)		2001-02-13	Arizona	–
F	–	(United States)	Westbeld, Kathryn (injured) (S)	6' 3" (1.91m)		1996-01-29	Notre Dame	1

Head coach
(United States) Nate Tibbetts (South Dakota)
Assistant coaches
(United States) John McCullough (Oklahoma)
(United States) Chevelle Saunsoci (Creighton)
(United States) TC Swirsky
(United States) Tangela Smith (Iowa)
(United States) Kristi Toliver (Maryland)
(United States) Megan Vogel (South Dakota State)

Legend

- (C) Team captain
- (DP) Unsigned draft pick
- (FA) Free agent
- (S) Suspended
- Injured

WNBA roster page

East
ATL
CHI
CON
IND
NY
TOR
WAS
West
DAL
GS
LV
LA
MIN
PHO
POR
SEA

=== Former players ===
- Kara Braxton (2010–2011)
- Emma Cannon (2017, 2022), (since 2025 L A Sparks)
- Monique Currie (2015)
- Anna DeForge (2003–2005)
- Candice Dupree (2010–2016)
- Tonya Edwards (2000-2001)
- Jennifer Gillom (1997–2002)
- Michelle Griffiths (1998–2000)
- Isabelle Harrison (2016), (since 2025 New York Liberty)
- Lisa Harrison (1999–2005)
- Tamicha Jackson (2003; 2006)
- Temeka Johnson (2009–2011)
- Nancy Lieberman (1997)
- Kelly Mazzante (2007–2009)
- Kelly Miller (2006–2008)
- Leilani Mitchell (2015, 2017–2019)
- Bridget Pettis (1997–2001)
- Erin Phillips (2014)
- Plenette Pierson (2003–2005)
- Cappie Pondexter (2006–2009)
- Brandy Reed (1998; 2000–2002)
- Danielle Robinson (2017)
- Tangela Smith (2007–2010)
- Belinda Snell (2005–2007)
- Maria Stepanova (1998–2001, 2005)
- Diana Taurasi (2004-2024)
- Penny Taylor (2004–2007; 2009–2011; 2013–2014; 2016)
- Michelle Timms (1997–2001)
- Slobodanka Tuvić (2001–2004)
- Kamila Vodičková (2005–2006)
- Shatori Walker-Kimbrough (2020), (since 2025 Atlanta Dream)
- Adrian Williams-Strong (2000–2004)
- Le'coe Willingham (2008–2009)

=== Retired numbers ===
Phoenix Mercury retired numbers
No.	Player	Position	Tenure	Date	Ref.
3	Diana Taurasi	G	2004–2024	August 16, 2026	
7	Michele Timms	G	1997–2001	August 7, 2002	
13	Penny Taylor	G/F	2004–2016	July 9, 2017	
22	Jennifer Gillom	F	1997–2002		
32	Bridget Pettis	G	1997–2006		

=== Hall of Famers ===
(from Women's Basketball Hall of Fame)

- Ann Meyers-Drysdale, enshrined 1999
- Jennifer Gillom, enshrined 2009
- Nancy Lieberman, enshrined 1996
- Cheryl Miller, enshrined 1995
- Linda Sharp, enshrined 2001
- Michele Timms, enshrined 2008
- Penny Taylor, enshrined 2022

=== FIBA Hall of Famers ===
Phoenix Mercury Hall of Famers
Players
No.	Name	Position	Tenure	Inducted
7	Michele Timms	G	1997–2001	2016

== Coaches and staff ==
=== Owners ===
- Jerry Colangelo, owner of the Phoenix Suns (1997–2003)
- Robert Sarver, owner of the Phoenix Suns (2004–2023)
- Mat Ishbia, owner of the Phoenix Suns (2023–present)

=== Head coaches ===
Phoenix Mercury head coaches
Name	Start	End	Seasons	Regular season				Playoffs			
Name	Start	End	Seasons	W	L	PCT	G	W	L	PCT	G
Cheryl Miller	January 27, 1997	December 1, 2000	4	70	52	.574	122	3	6	.333	9
Cynthia Cooper	January 8, 2001	June 26, 2002	2	19	23	.452	42	0	0	.000	0
Linda Sharp	June 26, 2002	end of 2002	1	5	17	.227	22	0	0	.000	0
John Shumate	October 23, 2002	end of 2003	1	8	26	.235	34	0	0	.000	0
Carrie Graf	April 14, 2004	end of 2005	2	33	35	.485	68	0	0	.000	0
Paul Westhead	October 11, 2005	September 18, 2007	2	41	27	.603	68	7	2	.778	9
Corey Gaines	November 7, 2007	August 8, 2013	6	90	101	.471	191	11	9	.550	20
Russ Pennell	August 8, 2013	October 18, 2013	1	9	4	.692	13	2	3	.400	5
Sandy Brondello	November 15, 2013	December 6, 2021	8	150	108	.581	258	24	19	.558	43
Vanessa Nygaard	January 24, 2022	June 25, 2023	2	17	31	.354	48	0	2	.000	2
Nikki Blue	June 25, 2023	October 17, 2023	1	7	21	.250	0	0	0	–	0
Nate Tibbetts	October 18, 2023	present	2	46	38	.548	84	5	8	.385	13

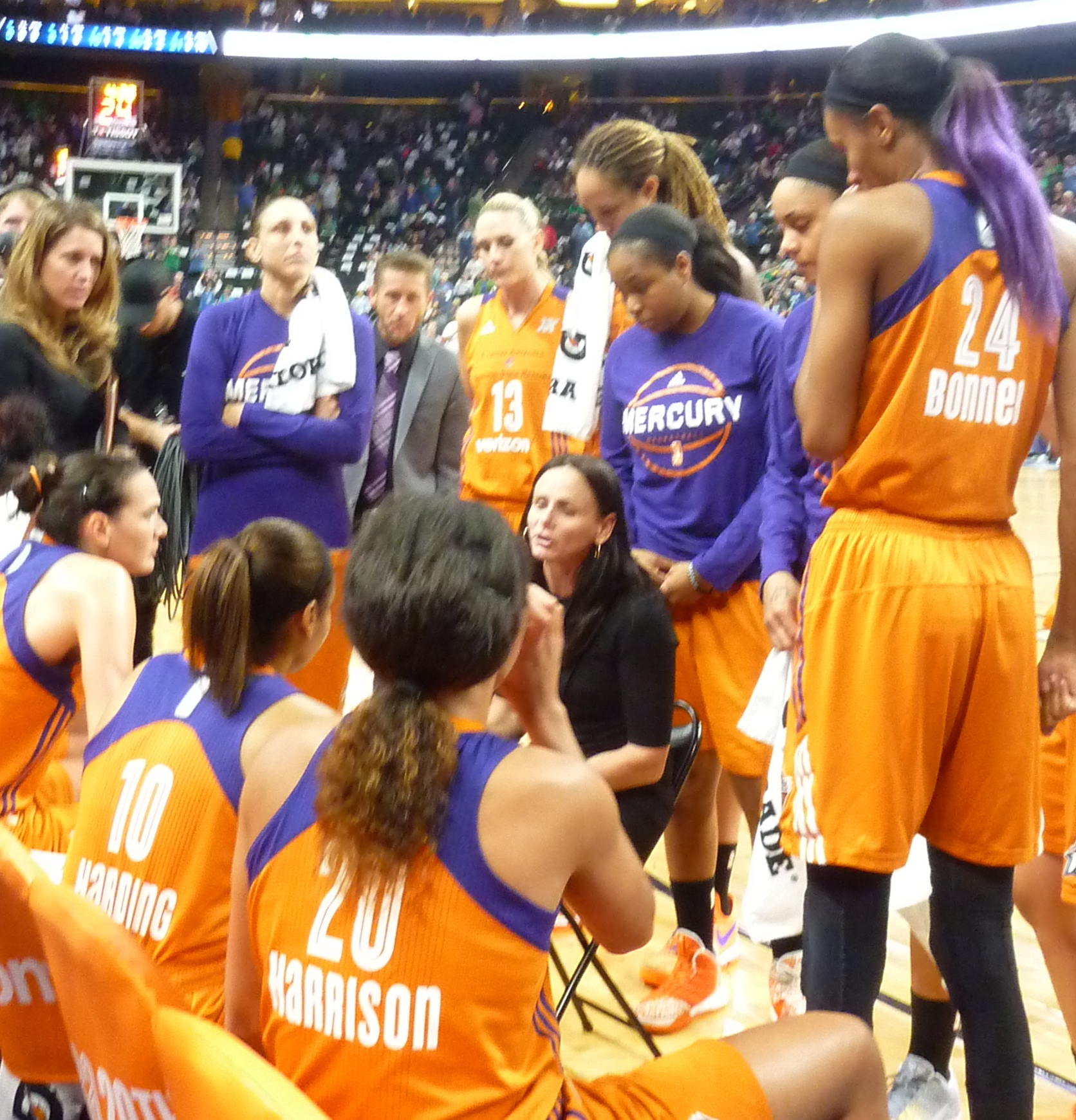
Coaches Julie Hairgrove, Todd Troxel (left to right) and head coach Sandy Brondello (seated) in a timeout during the 2016 WNBA semifinals.

=== General managers ===
- Cheryl Miller (1997–2000)
- Seth Sulka (2001–2006)
- Ann Meyers-Drysdale (2007–2011)
- Corey Gaines (2012–2013)
- Amber Cox (2013)
- Jim Pitman (2013–2023)
- Nick U'Ren (2023–present)

=== Assistant coaches ===
- Steve Smith (1997)
- Kathy Anderson (1998)
- Carrie Graf (1998–1999, 2001, 2003)
- Howie Landa (1999)
- Tom Lewis (2000)
- Linda Sharp (2000–2002)
- Vonn Read (2000)
- Eric Cooper (2001–2002)
- Gary Kloppenburg (2003)
- Brian Agler (2004)
- Lisa Harrison (2004)
- Cedric Ceballos (2004)
- Michele Timms (2005)
- Bridget Pettis (2006–2011)
- Corey Gaines (2006–2007)
- Earl Cureton (2012–2013)
- Tom Hovasse (2012–2013)
- Anthony Boone (2013)
- Julie Hairgrove (2005–2021)
- Todd Troxel (2014–2018)
- Penny Taylor (2019)
- Chasity Melvin (2020–2021)
- Nikki Blue (2022–2023)
- Cinnamon Lister (2022–present)
- Crystal Robinson (2022)
- Charli Turner Thorne (2023)
- Taja Edwards (2023)
- Tully Bevilaqua (2023)
- Kristi Toliver (2024–present)
- Megan Vogel (2024–present)
- Michael Joiner (2024–present)

== Statistics ==
Phoenix Mercury statistics
1990s

Season	Individual			Team vs Opponents		
Season	PPG	RPG	APG	PPG	RPG	FG%
1997	J. Gillom (15.7)	T. Foster (6.1)	M. Timms (5.1)	69.2 vs 65.2	32.9 vs 33.0	.373 vs .413
1998	J. Gillom (20.8)	J. Gillom (7.3)	M. Timms (5.3)	73.9 vs 67.5	31.4 vs 31.4	.424 vs .434
1999	J. Gillom (15.2)	M. Askamp (7.2)	M. Timms (5.0)	68.0 vs 68.2	31.3 vs 31.6	.399 vs .415

2000s

Season	Individual			Team vs Opponents		
Season	PPG	RPG	APG	PPG	RPG	FG%
2000	B. Reed (19.0)	B. Reed (5.8)	M. Cleary (3.2)	70.1 vs 65.7	27.9 vs 30.3	.446 vs .423
2001	J. Gillom (12.3)	M. Stepanova (6.3)	K. Veal (4.3)	64.5 vs 67.8	29.4 vs 32.2	.405 vs .415
2002	J. Gillom (15.3)	A. Williams (6.9)	G. Grubin (3.3)	65.3 vs 71.6	28.7 vs 31.3	.420 vs .455
2003	A. DeForge (11.9)	A. Williams (7.4)	T. Jackson (4.3)	61.7 vs 66.8	29.4 vs 32.8	.382 vs .447
2004	D. Taurasi (17.0)	P. Taylor (4.8)	D. Taurasi (3.9)	67.6 vs 65.7	26.9 vs 30.0	.430 vs .425
2005	D. Taurasi (16.0)	K. Vodichkova (7.0)	D. Taurasi (4.5)	69.4 vs 69.2	31.2 vs 30.1	.414 vs .429
2006	D. Taurasi (25.3)	K. Vodichkova (6.7)	D. Taurasi (4.1)	87.1 vs 84.7	33.7 vs 37.7	.443 vs .433
2007	D. Taurasi (19.2)	T. Smith (6.5)	K. Miller (4.6)	89.0 vs 85.4	33.9 vs 40.9	.439 vs .405
2008	D. Taurasi (24.1)	T. Smith (7.0)	K. Miller (4.0)	88.5 vs 88.5	36.1 vs 38.2	.430 vs .421
2009	D. Taurasi (20.4)	D. Bonner (5.8)	C. Pondexter (5.0)	92.8 vs 89.1	35.0 vs 37.8	.460 vs .424

2010s

Season	Individual			Team vs Opponents		
Season	PPG	RPG	APG	PPG	RPG	FG%
2010	D. Taurasi (22.6)	C. Dupree (7.6)	P. Taylor (5.0)	93.9 vs 93.8	35.7 vs 37.6	.473 vs .455
2011	D. Taurasi (21.6)	C. Dupree (8.2)	P. Taylor (4.7)	89.0 vs 86.0	35.1 vs 34.2	.461 vs .440
2012	D. Bonner (20.6)	K. Thomas (8.0)	S. Prahalis (4.5)	74.5 vs 86.7	37.4 vs 36.1	.384 vs .437
2013	D. Taurasi (20.3)	C. Dupree (6.4)	D. Taurasi (6.2)	79.7 vs 80.3	35.1 vs 34.2	.453 vs .411
2014	D. Taurasi (16.2)	B. Griner (8.0)	D. Taurasi (5.6)	83.5 vs 74.1	33.7 vs 34.5	.484 vs .409
2015	D. Bonner (15.8)	B. Griner (8.1)	D. Bonner (3.3)	75.1 vs 72.3	33.4 vs 35.0	.437 vs .396
2016	D. Taurasi (17.8)	B. Griner (6.5)	D. Taurasi (3.9)	84.6 vs 83.3	32.4 vs 34.4	.453 vs .440
2017	B. Griner (21.9)	B. Griner (7.6)	L. Mitchell (3.6)	81.9 vs 81.9	32.1 vs 34.6	.440 vs .438
2018	D. Taurasi (20.7)	B. Griner (7.7)	D. Taurasi (5.3)	85.8 vs 83.2	32.6 vs 34.4	.457 vs .431
2019	B. Griner (20.7)	D. Bonner (7.6)	D. Taurasi (5.3)	76.5 vs 77.6	32.5 vs 37.2	.424 vs .422

2020s

Season	Individual			Team vs Opponents		
Season	PPG	RPG	APG	PPG	RPG	FG%
2020	D. Taurasi (18.7)	B. Turner (9.0)	B. Hartley & D. Taurasi (4.5)	86.1 vs 84.1	34.0 vs 36.0	.450 vs .425
2021	B. Griner (20.5)	B. Griner (9.5)	S. Diggins (5.3)	82.1 vs 79.5	36.2 vs 34.9	.450 vs .417
2022	S. Diggins (19.7)	B. Turner (6.8)	S. Diggins (5.5)	81.1 vs 84.1	31.2 vs 37.2	.429 vs .441
2023	B. Griner (17.5)	B. Griner & B. Turner (6.3)	S. Sutton (4.8)	76.6 vs. 84.9	30.9 vs. 33.9	.444 vs. .448
2024	K. Copper (21.1)	B. Griner (6.6)	N. Cloud (6.9)	81.5 vs 84.8	32.3 vs 37.0	.439 vs .431
2025	S. Sabally (16.3)	A. Thomas (8.8)	A. Thomas (9.2)	82.8 vs 80.1	34.7 vs 35.3	.433 vs .427

== Media coverage ==
Currently, Mercury games are broadcast on Arizona's Family, a group of Phoenix television stations (KPHO-TV, KTVK and KPHE-LD) owned by Gray Television. KTVK will carry at least 13 Mercury games per season, with the remaining games on KPHE.

Some Mercury games are broadcast nationally on ESPN, ESPN2, Ion Television (KPPX-TV), CBS (KPHO-TV), ABC (KNXV-TV) NBC (KPNX), Prime Video, USA, NBCSN and NBA TV.

== All-time notes ==
=== Regular season attendance ===
- A sellout for a basketball game at the Mortgage Matchup Center is 17,071.

Regular season all-time attendance
Year	Average	High	Low	Sellouts	Total for year	WNBA game average
1997	13,703 (1st)	17,747	10,898	0	191,835	9,669
1998	13,764 (3rd)	14,705	12,522	0	206,467	10,869
1999	12,219 (3rd)	13,483	11,328	0	195,508	10,207
2000	10,130 (5th)	11,390	9,327	0	162,079	9,074
2001	8,558 (9th)	14,117	6,680	0	136,922	9,075
2002	8,749 (8th)	11,347	7,199	0	139,978	9,228
2003	8,501 (7th)	10,203	6,464	0	144,511	8,800
2004	7,638 (8th)	10,493	5,147	0	129,848	8,613
2005	7,303 (9th)	10,503	5,865	0	124,146	8,172
2006	7,496 (7th)	11,661	5,091	0	127,430	7,476
2007	7,711 (9th)	13,569	6,033	0	131,085	7,742
2008	8,522 (5th)	15,499	4,478	0	144,867	7,948
2009	8,523 (4th)	13,582	5,672	0	144,844	8,039
2010	8,982 (4th)	14,772	5,506	0	152,686	7,834
2011	9,167 (3rd)	12,666	6,108	0	155,845	7,954
2012	7,814 (5th)	10,656	5,421	0	132,454	7,452
2013	8,557 (3rd)	13,065	5,972	0	145,466	7,531
2014	9,557 (1st)	12,756	7,845	0	162,464	7,578
2015	9,946 (1st)	12,296	8,319	0	169,077	7,184
2016	10,351 (1st)	13,048	8,412	0	175,965	7,655
2017	9,913 (3rd)	12,043	5,764	0	168,516	7,716
2018	9,950 (3rd)	13,106	7,769	0	169,149	6,721
2019	9,069 (2nd)	17,943	8,001	0	154,179	6,535
2020	Due to the COVID-19 pandemic, the season was played in Bradenton, Florida without fans.					
2021	5,849 (1st)	9,811	3,618	0	93,585	2,636
2022	7,974 (2nd)	14,162	5,044	0	143,530	5,679
2023	9,197 (2nd)	14,040	5,652	0	183,935	6,615
2024	10,715 (6th)	17,071	7,474	1	214,296	9,807
2025	11,305 (7th)	17,071	8,024	1	248,731	10,986

=== Draft picks ===
- 1997 Elite: Bridget Pettis (7), Nancy Lieberman-Cline (15)
- 1997: Toni Foster (8), Tia Jackson (9), Umeki Webb (24), Monique Ambers (25)
- 1998: Maria Stepanova (8), Andrea Kuklova (18), Brandy Reed (28), Karen Wilkins (38)
- 1999: Edna Campbell (10), Clarissa Davis-Wrightsil (22), Lisa Harrison (34), Amanda Wilson (46)
- 2000: Adrian Williams (21), Tauja Catchings (37), Shantia Owens (53)
- 2001: Kristen Veal (13), Ilona Korstine (29), Tere Williams (45), Carolyn Moos (53), Megan Franza (61)
- 2002: Tootie Shaw (25), Kayte Christensen (40), Amba Kongolo (56)
- 2003 Miami/Portland Dispersal Draft: Tamicha Jackson (4)
- 2003: Plenette Pierson (4), Petra Ujhelyi (16), Telisha Quarles (31), Marion Jones (33)
- 2004 Cleveland Dispersal Draft: Penny Taylor (1)
- 2004: Diana Taurasi (1), Chandi Jones (8), Ashley Robinson (14), Maria Villarroel (27)
- 2005: Sandora Irvin (3), Angelina Williams (18), Jamie Carey (31)
- 2006: Cappie Pondexter (2), Liz Shimek (18), Mistie Williams (21), Crystal Smith (32)
- 2007 Charlotte Dispersal Draft: selection waived
- 2007: Lindsey Harding (1), Tyresa Smith (18), Leah Rush (28), Chrissy Givens (31), Emily Westerbeg (37)
- 2008: LaToya Pringle (13), Leilani Mitchell (25), Merscilla Packer (41)
- 2009 Houston Dispersal Draft: Sequoia Holmes (5)
- 2009: DeWanna Bonner (5), Sha Brooks (31), Jessica Adair (34)
- 2010 Sacramento Dispersal Draft: selection waived
- 2010: Tyra Grant (24), Nyeshia Stevenson (36)
- 2011: Brittany Spears (19), Tahnee Robinson (31)
- 2012: Samantha Prahalis (6), C'eria Ricketts (24), Christine Flores (30), Amanda Johnson (33)
- 2013: Brittney Griner (1), Nikki Greene (26)
- 2014: Tiffany Bias (17), Maggie Lucas (21), Stephanie Talbot (33)
- 2015: Isabelle Harrison (12), Alex Harden (18), Žofia Hruščáková (24), Promise Amukamara (36)
- 2016: Courtney Williams (8), Jullian Alleyne (20), Nirra Fields (32)
- 2017: Alexis Prince (29)
- 2018: Marie Gülich (12), Tyler Scaife (20), Raisa Musina (21), Imani Wright (26)
- 2019: Alanna Smith (8), Sophie Cunningham (13), Arica Carter (32)
- 2020: Jocelyn Willoughby (10), Te'a Cooper (18), Stella Johnson (29)
- 2021: Ciera Johnson (32)
- 2022: Maya Dodson (26), Macee Williams (32)
- 2023: Destiny Harden (27), Kadi Sissoko (29)
- 2024: Charisma Osborne (25), Jaz Shelley (29)

=== Trades ===
- July 31, 1997: The Mercury acquired Mikiko Hagiwara from the Sacramento Monarchs in exchange for future considerations.
- July 6, 1998: The Mercury traded Pauline Jordan to the Sacramento Monarchs in exchange for Tiffani Johnson.
- October 27, 1999: The Mercury traded Marlies Askamp, Angela Aycock and Kristi Harrower to the Minnesota Lynx in exchange for Adia Barnes, Tonya Edwards and Trisha Fallon.
- February 18, 2000: The Mercury acquired Brandy Reed from the Minnesota Lynx in exchange for the fifth pick in the 2000 Draft.
- April 25, 2000: The Mercury traded Shantia Owens to the Miami Sol in exchange for a fourth-round pick in the 2001 Draft.
- May 27, 2001: The Mercury acquired Jaynetta Saunders from the Cleveland Rockers in exchange for a second-round pick in the 2002 Draft.
- June 22, 2001: The Mercury traded Tonya Edwards to the Charlotte Sting in exchange for a second-round pick in the 2002 Draft.
- March 4, 2002: The Mercury traded the eighth pick in the 2002 Draft to the Cleveland Rockers in exchange for Pollyana Johns-Kimborough.
- March 4, 2002: The Mercury traded the 15th pick in the 2002 Draft to the Miami Sol in exchange for Tracy Reid and the 13th pick in the 2002 Draft.
- March 4, 2002: The Mercury traded Bridget Pettis and the 13th pick in the 2002 Draft to the Indiana Fever in exchange for Gordana Grubin.
- May 3, 2002: The Mercury traded a fourth-round pick in the 2003 Draft to the Detroit Shock in exchange for Claudia das Neves.
- May 5, 2002: The Mercury traded Claudia das Neves to the Miami Sol in exchange for a third-round pick in the 2003 Draft.
- April 28, 2003: The Mercury traded Petra Ujhelyi and Telisha Quarles to the Detroit Shock in exchange for Edwina Brown and Lenae Williams.
- July 31, 2003: The Mercury traded Stacey Thomas to the Detroit Shock in exchange for Tamara Moore.
- June 29, 2005: The Mercury traded Plenette Pierson to the Detroit Shock in exchange for Andrea Stinson and a second-round pick in the 2006 Draft.
- February 21, 2007: The Mercury traded Sandora Irvin to the San Antonio Silver Stars in exchange for a second-round pick in the 2008 Draft.
- April 2, 2007: The Mercury traded a second-round pick in the 2008 Draft to the New York Liberty in exchange for Kelly Schumacher.
- April 4, 2007: The Mercury traded Lindsey Harding to the Minnesota Lynx in exchange for Tangela Smith.
- May 7, 2008: The Mercury traded Leilani Mitchell to the New York Liberty in exchange for a third-round pick in the 2009 Draft.
- January 30, 2009: The Mercury traded Kelly Miller and LaToya Pringle to the Minnesota Lynx in exchange for Nicole Ohlde.
- March 20, 2009: The Mercury traded Barbara Farris to the Sacramento Monarchs in exchange for A'Quonesia Franklin and Kim Smith.
- March 26, 2009: The Mercury traded a first-round pick in the 2010 Draft to the Los Angeles Sparks in exchange for Temeka Johnson.
- March 30, 2010: The Mercury traded Cappie Pondexter and Kelly Mazzante to the New York Liberty and received Candice Dupree from the Chicago Sky. Chicago received Shameka Christon and Cathrine Kraayeveld from New York as part of this trade.
- July 23, 2010: The Mercury traded Nicole Ohlde and a first-round pick in the 2011 Draft in exchange for Kara Braxton.
- April 11, 2011: The Mercury traded Tahnee Robinson to the Connecticut Sun in exchange for a third-round pick in the 2012 Draft.
- August 4, 2011: The Mercury traded Kara Braxton to the New York Liberty in exchange for Sidney Spencer.
- January 12, 2012: The Mercury traded Temeka Johnson to the Tulsa Shock in exchange for Andrea Riley.
- February 2, 2012: The Mercury traded a second-round pick in the 2013 Draft to the Minnesota Lynx in exchange for Alexis Hornbuckle.
- February 28, 2012: The Mercury traded the 18th pick in the 2012 Draft to the Minnesota Lynx in exchange for Charde Houston and the 24th pick in the 2012 Draft.
- March 11, 2014: The Mercury traded Lynetta Kizer to the Indiana Fever in exchange for Erin Phillips.
- March 27, 2014: The Mercury traded Charde Houston to the Seattle Storm in exchange for Ewelina Kobryn.
- May 12, 2014: The Mercury traded Maggie Lucas to the Indiana Fever in exchange for a second-round pick in the 2015 Draft.
- May 9, 2016: The Mercury traded Monique Currie to the San Antonio Stars in exchange for a second-round pick in the 2017 Draft.
- June 25, 2016: The Mercury traded Courtney Williams, Jillian Alleyne, and San Antonio's second-round pick to the Connecticut Sun in exchange for Kelsey Bone.
- June 25, 2016: The Mercury traded Noelle Quinn to the Seattle Storm in exchange for Angel Robinson.
- January 31, 2017: The Mercury traded Isabelle Harrison and a 2017 first round draft pick to the San Antonio Stars in exchange for Danielle Robinson.
- February 21, 2017: In a three-team trade, the Mercury traded Candice Dupree and a second round pick in the 2017 Draft to the Indiana Fever and acquired Camille Little and the draft rights to Jillian Alleyne from the Connecticut Sun.
- February 21, 2018: The Mercury traded Cayla George for the 21st pick in the 2018 WNBA Draft. In a separate trade, the Mercury traded Kelsey Bone for 26th pick in the 2018 WNBA draft and a third round pick in the 2019 WNBA Draft.
- March 6, 2018: The Mercury traded the 8th pick in the 2018 WNBA Draft for Briann January. In a separate trade, the Mercury traded Danielle Robinson and a second round pick in the 2019 WNBA Draft for the 12th pick in the 2018 WNBA Draft.
- May 21, 2019: The Mercury traded Stephanie Talbot to Minnesota in exchange for Minnesota's second round pick in the 2020 Draft.
- February 11, 2020: The Mercury traded DeWanna Bonner to Connecticut in exchange for the 7th and 10th pick in the 2020 Draft and Connecticut's first round pick in the 2021 Draft.
- February 12, 2020: The Mercury traded the 5th and 7th pick in the 2020 Draft and Connecticut's first round pick in the 2021 Draft (acquired via Feb. 11 trade) to Dallas in exchange for Skylar Diggins.
- February 19, 2020: The Mercury traded Briann January, the 17th pick in the 2020 Draft, and their second round pick in the 2021 Draft to Atlanta for Jessica Breland and Nia Coffey.
- April 17, 2020: The Mercury traded the draft rights to Jocelyn Willoughby to New York in exchange for Shatori Walker-Kimbrough.
- February 10, 2021: The Mercury traded the 6th overall pick in the 2021 Draft and a first round pick in the 2022 Draft to New York in exchange for Kia Nurse and Megan Walker.
- February 13, 2021: The Mercury traded Yvonne Turner to Atlanta for the Dream's 2022 third round pick.
- January 31, 2022: The Mercury traded Kia Vaugh to Atlanta for the Dream's 2023 third round pick.
- February 3, 2022: The Mercury traded Bria Hartley, the 20th pick in the 2022 Draft and a second round pick in the 2023 Draft to Indiana and their 2023 First Round pick to Chicago in exchange for Diamond DeShields.
- February 11, 2023: The Mercury traded Diamond DeShields and the right to swap 2025 first round picks with New York in exchange for Michaela Onyenwere, and Chicago's Third Round pick in the 2024 WNBA Draft, and Second Round pick in the 2025 WNBA Draft.
- February 3, 2024: The Mercury traded Moriah Jefferson to Connecticut in exchange for Rebecca Allen.
- February 6, 2024: The Mercury traded Michaela Onyenwere, Brianna Turner, the third pick in the 2024 Draft, a second round pick in the 2025 Draft (originally Chicago's), their own 2026 first round pick, and the rights to swap second round 2026 picks with Chicago in exchange for Kahleah Copper, and the rights to Morgan Bertsch.
- August 20, 2024: The Mercury traded Sug Sutton and their third round pick in the 2025 Draft to Washington in exchange for the rights to Klara Lundquist.
- February 2, 2025: The Mercury participated in a four team trade, which saw them acquire Alyssa Thomas, Satou Sabally, Kalani Brown, and Sevgi Uzun, in exchange for Rebecca Allen, Natasha Cloud, Sophie Cunningham, the rights to Mikiah Herbert Harrigan, and their first and second round picks in the 2025 WNBA draft.

=== All-Stars ===
- 1997: No All-Star Game
- 1998: No All-Star Game
- 1999: Michelle Timms
- 2000: Brandy Reed
- 2001: None
- 2002: None
- 2003: Adrian Williams
- 2004: Anna DeForge, Diana Taurasi
- 2005: Diana Taurasi
- 2006: Cappie Pondexter, Diana Taurasi
- 2007: Cappie Pondexter, Diana Taurasi, Penny Taylor
- 2008: No All-Star Game
- 2009: Cappie Pondexter, Diana Taurasi
- 2010: Candice Dupree, Diana Taurasi, Penny Taylor
- 2011: Diana Taurasi, Penny Taylor
- 2012: No All-Star Game
- 2013: Brittney Griner, Diana Taurasi
- 2014: Candice Dupree, Brittney Griner, Diana Taurasi
- 2015: DeWanna Bonner, Candice Dupree, Brittney Griner
- 2016: No All-Star Game
- 2017: Brittney Griner, Diana Taurasi
- 2018: DeWanna Bonner, Brittney Griner, Diana Taurasi
- 2019: DeWanna Bonner, Brittney Griner
- 2020: No All-Star Game
- 2021: Skylar Diggins, Brittney Griner, Diana Taurasi
- 2022: Skylar Diggins, Brittney Griner
- 2023: Brittney Griner
- 2024: Kahleah Copper, Brittney Griner, Diana Taurasi
- 2025: Satou Sabally, Alyssa Thomas

=== Olympians ===
- 2000: Maria Stepanova (RUS)
- 2004: Diana Taurasi, Penny Taylor (AUS)
- 2008: Diana Taurasi, Cappie Pondexter, Penny Taylor (AUS)
- 2012: Diana Taurasi
- 2016: Brittney Griner, Diana Taurasi, Penny Taylor (AUS), Sonja Petrović (SER), Lindsey Harding (BLR), Marta Xargay (ESP)
- 2020: Skylar Diggins, Brittney Griner, Diana Taurasi, Kia Nurse (CAN), Alanna Smith (AUS)
- 2024: Kahleah Copper, Brittney Griner, Diana Taurasi

=== Honors and awards ===
- 1997 All-WNBA Second Team: Jennifer Gillom
- 1998 All-WNBA First Team: Jennifer Gillom
- 2002 Kim Perrot Sportsmanship Award: Jennifer Gillom
- 2004 Rookie of the Year: Diana Taurasi
- 2004 All-WNBA First Team: Diana Taurasi
- 2005 All-WNBA Second Team: Diana Taurasi
- 2006 All-WNBA First Team: Diana Taurasi
- 2006 All-Rookie Team: Cappie Pondexter
- 2006 Peak Performer (Scoring): Diana Taurasi
- 2007 Finals MVP: Cappie Pondexter
- 2007 All-WNBA First Team: Diana Taurasi
- 2007 All-WNBA First Team: Penny Taylor
- 2008 All-WNBA First Team: Diana Taurasi
- 2008 Peak Performer (Scoring): Diana Taurasi
- 2009 Most Valuable Player: Diana Taurasi
- 2009 Finals MVP: Diana Taurasi
- 2009 All-WNBA First Team: Diana Taurasi
- 2009 All-WNBA First Team: Cappie Pondexter
- 2009 All-Rookie Team: DeWanna Bonner
- 2009 Sixth Woman of the Year: DeWanna Bonner
- 2009 Peak Performer (Scoring): Diana Taurasi
- 2010 All-WNBA First Team: Diana Taurasi
- 2010 Sixth Woman of the Year: DeWanna Bonner
- 2010 Peak Performer (Scoring): Diana Taurasi
- 2011 All-WNBA First Team: Diana Taurasi
- 2011 All-WNBA Second Team: Penny Taylor
- 2011 Sixth Woman of the Year: DeWanna Bonner
- 2011 Peak Performer (Scoring): Diana Taurasi
- 2012 All-Rookie Team: Samantha Prahalis
- 2013 All-WNBA First Team: Diana Taurasi
- 2013 All-Rookie Team: Brittney Griner
- 2014 Finals MVP: Diana Taurasi
- 2014 Defensive Player of the Year: Brittney Griner
- 2014 Peak Performer (Assists): Diana Taurasi
- 2014 Coach of the Year: Sandy Brondello
- 2014 All-WNBA First Team: Brittney Griner
- 2014 All-WNBA First Team: Diana Taurasi
- 2014 All-Defensive First Team: Brittney Griner
- 2015 Defensive Player of the Year: Brittney Griner
- 2015 All-Defensive First Team: Brittney Griner
- 2015 All-Defensive Second Team: DeWanna Bonner
- 2015 All-WNBA First Team: DeWanna Bonner
- 2015 All-WNBA Second Team: Brittney Griner
- 2016 All-Defensive Second Team: Brittney Griner
- 2017 All-WNBA Second Team: Diana Taurasi
- 2017 All-WNBA Second Team: Brittney Griner
- 2018 All-WNBA First Team: Diana Taurasi
- 2018 All-WNBA Second Team: Brittney Griner
- 2019 Most Improved Player: Leilani Mitchell
- 2019 Peak Performer (Points): Brittney Griner
- 2019 All-WNBA First Team: Brittney Griner
- 2019 All-Defensive Second Team: Brittney Griner
- 2019 All-Rookie Team: Brianna Turner
- 2020 All-Defensive First Team: Brianna Turner
- 2020 All-WNBA Second Team: Diana Taurasi
- 2020 All-WNBA Second Team: Skylar Diggins
- 2021 All-Defensive First Team: Brianna Turner
- 2021 All-Defensive Second Team: Brittney Griner
- 2021 All-WNBA First Team: Skylar Diggins
- 2021 All-WNBA First Team: Brittney Griner
- 2022 All-WNBA First Team: Skylar Diggins
- 2024 All-WNBA Second Team: Kahleah Copper
- 2024 All-Defensive Second Team: Natasha Cloud
- 2025 All-WNBA First Team: Alyssa Thomas
- 2025 All-Defensive First Team: Alyssa Thomas

== Notes ==
Sporting positions
Preceded by Minnesota Lynx	WNBA Champions; 2014 (Third title)	Succeeded by Minnesota Lynx
Preceded by Minnesota Lynx	WNBA Western Conference Champions; 2014 (Fourth title)	Succeeded by Minnesota Lynx
Preceded by Detroit Shock	WNBA Champions; 2009 (Second title)	Succeeded by Seattle Storm
Preceded by San Antonio Silver Stars	WNBA Western Conference Champions; 2009 (Third title)	Succeeded by Seattle Storm
Preceded by Detroit Shock	WNBA Champions; 2007 (First title)	Succeeded by Detroit Shock
Preceded by Sacramento Monarchs	WNBA Western Conference Champions; 2007 (Second title)	Succeeded by San Antonio Silver Stars
Preceded by First Co-Champions	WNBA Western Conference co-champions With Houston Comets; 1998 (First title)	Succeeded by Houston Comets
