= Michelle Chandler =

Australian basketball player

Personal information
- Full name: Michelle Louise Chandler
- Born: 16 July 1974 (age 51) Geelong, Victoria
Medal record
Women's basketball
Representing Australia
Olympic Games
Bronze medal – third place	1996 Atlanta	Team competition
World Junior Championships
Gold medal – first place	1993 Seoul	Team competition

Michelle Louise Chandler (born 16 July 1974) is a retired basketball player from Australia, who played for the Melbourne Tigers. She was a member of the national women's team that won the bronze medal at the 1996 Summer Olympics in Atlanta, Georgia. She attended the Australian Institute of Sport in 1992. Her married name is Michelle Cleary.

== See also ==
- List of Australian WNBA players
