= Marie Ferdinand-Harris =

American basketball player (born 1978)

Personal information
- Born: October 13, 1978 (age 48) Miami, Florida, U.S.
- Listed height: 5 ft 9 in (1.75 m)
- Listed weight: 162 lb (73 kg)

Career information
- High school: Edison (Miami, Florida)
- College: LSU (1997–2001)
- WNBA draft: 2001: 1st round, 8th overall pick
- Drafted by: Utah Starzz
- Playing career: 2001–2011
- Position: Shooting guard
- Number: 9

Career history
- 2001–2007: Utah Starzz / San Antonio Silver Stars
- 2008–2010: Los Angeles Sparks
- 2011: Phoenix Mercury

Career highlights
- 3× WNBA All-Star (2002, 2003, 2005); Kodak All-American (2001); 2× First-team All-SEC (2000, 2001)
- Stats at WNBA.com
- Stats at Basketball Reference
Medals
Women's basketball
Representing USA
Jones Cup
Gold medal – first place	2000 Taipei	Team competition

Marie Ferdinand-Harris (born October 13, 1978) is an American professional basketball player most recently for the Phoenix Mercury in the Women's National Basketball Association.

== Early years ==
Ferdinand-Harris was born in Miami, Florida, and is of Haitian descent.

== High school career ==
As a senior, Ferdinand averaged 24.0 points, seven rebounds, 5.4 assists, and 2 steals per game, and was named the 1995 Player of the Year in Florida.

== College career ==
Ferdinand attended Louisiana State University and played for the LSU Lady Tigers basketball team. She competed with USA Basketball as a member of the 2000 Jones Cup Team that won the Gold in Taipei.

== WNBA career ==
Ferdinand was selected by the Utah Starzz 8th overall in the 1st round of the 2001 WNBA draft. For her career, Ferdinand averages 13.1 ppg, 3.4 rpg, 2.4 apg, and 1.56 steals per game. She is a two time WNBA All-Star, playing on the 2002 and 2003 teams.

Ferdinand missed the entire 2006 WNBA season after giving birth to her first child.

On February 22, 2008, Ferdinand-Harris signed with the Los Angeles Sparks.

== International career ==
- 2005–06 Fenerbahçe Istanbul (Turkey)
- Lotos Gdynia (Poland)

== Career statistics ==
Legend
GP	Games played	GS	Games started	MPG	Minutes per game	RPG	Rebounds per game
APG	Assists per game	SPG	Steals per game	BPG	Blocks per game	PPG	Points per game
TO	Turnovers per game	FG%	Field-goal percentage	3P%	3-point field-goal percentage	FT%	Free-throw percentage
**Bold**	Career best	°	League leader

=== WNBA ===
==== Regular season ====
WNBA regular season statistics
Year	Team	GP	GS	MPG	FG%	3P%	FT%	RPG	APG	SPG	BPG	TO	PPG
2001	Utah	32	22	27.0	**49.3**	26.2	61.1	2.7	2.5	1.3	0.1	2.0	11.4
2002	Utah	32	32	**33.3**	47.4	14.7	77.2	3.3	**2.8**	1.6	**0.2**	2.8	**15.3**
2003	San Antonio	**34**	**34**	32.8	36.2	30.8	78.9	**3.7**	2.6	1.7	**0.2**	2.5	13.8
2004	San Antonio	17	17	29.9	41.4	**37.0**	85.9	3.2	1.7	**1.9**	0.1	2.1	11.7
2005	San Antonio	31	31	32.2	36.9	30.8	77.6	**3.7**	2.2	1.5	**0.2**	2.3	12.5
2006	Did not play (pregnancy/childbirth)												
2007	San Antonio	34	12	14.1	35.9	22.2	90.0	2.4	0.8	0.6	0.1	1.1	4.8
2008	Los Angeles	33	25	20.6	37.0	27.3	89.1	2.6	1.3	0.8	0.1	1.2	8.4
2009	Los Angeles	28	6	12.1	43.0	18.2	83.8	1.5	0.9	0.5	0.1	**0.8**	5.4
2010	Los Angeles	30	24	24.3	40.9	29.2	83.9	2.7	1.2	0.9	**0.2**	1.1	8.9
2011	Phoenix	**34**	2	17.4	33.5	33.3	**97.4**	1.5	1.1	0.6	**0.2**	1.3	6.8
**Career**	10 years, 3 teams	305	205	24.2	40.2	28.0	79.5	2.7	1.7	1.1	0.1	1.7	9.8
**Career**	All-Star	3	0	13.6	50.0	0.0	—	0.0	1.0	1.3	0.0	1.7	6.0

==== Playoffs ====
WNBA playoff statistics
Year	Team	GP	GS	MPG	FG%	3P%	FT%	RPG	APG	SPG	BPG	TO	PPG
2001	Utah	2	2	34.5	43.8	0.0	83.3	4.0	**3.5**	1.5	0.0	1.0	14.5
2002	Utah	5	**5**	**37.2**	**44.6**	20.0	67.6	**4.4**	2.6	**2.0**	0.0	4.0	**14.8**
2007	San Antonio	5	0	14.2	42.3	0.0	84.6	3.8	1.2	**2.0**	0.0	1.2	6.6
2008	Los Angeles	**6**	0	18.5	38.5	36.4	91.7	2.5	1.8	0.3	0.0	1.3	7.5
2009	Los Angeles	2	0	7.0	25.0	50.0	**100.0**	1.0	0.0	0.5	0.0	**0.0**	2.5
2010	Los Angeles	2	2	32.5	39.1	42.9	**100.0**	2.0	0.5	1.5	0.0	1.0	12.5
2011	Phoenix	4	0	12.3	36.4	**50.0**	**100.0**	1.5	0.8	0.5	**0.3**	1.0	5.8
**Career**	7 years, 3 teams	26	9	21.7	40.9	33.3	80.7	2.9	1.6	1.2	0.0	1.6	9.0

=== College ===
NCAA statistics
Year	Team	GP	Points	FG%	FT%	RPG	PPG
1997-98	LSU	27	66	37.7%	58.3%	2.3	2.4
1998-99	LSU	30	368	46.3%	66.3%	**5.2**	12.3
1999-00	LSU	**32**	500	50.1%	66.7%	4.7	17.5
2000-01	LSU	31	**654**	**51.5%**	73.9%	5.1	**21.1**
**Career**		120	1648	48.9%	69.7%	4.4	13.7

== Personal life ==
On January 13, 2006, the San Antonio Express-News reported that Ferdinand was expecting a baby in June, and was planning to return to the San Antonio Silver Stars by July 2006, after the WNBA All-Star Game.

She and Cedrick Harris, a former player on the LSU Tigers baseball team and former baseball coach (2007–2009) at Antonian College Preparatory High School in San Antonio, met at Louisiana State University and were married on October 8, 2006.
