= Winthrop Eagles women's basketball =

2026–27 Winthrop Eagles women's basketball team
- University: Winthrop University
- Head coach: Semeka Randall Lay (7th season)
- Location: Rock Hill, South Carolina
- Arena: Winthrop Coliseum (capacity: 6,100)
- Conference: Big South
- Nickname: Eagles
- Colors: Garnet and gold

NCAA Division I tournament appearances
- 2014

Conference tournament champions
- 2014

Uniforms
Home	Away

The Winthrop Eagles women's basketball is the team that represents Winthrop University located in Rock Hill, South Carolina, United States and competes in the Big South Conference.

== History ==
Winthrop began play in 1969. From 1982 to 1986, they played in the NAIA before joining the NCAA in 1986. They made an appearance in the WNIT in 2013, their first postseason appearance in school history. They beat Florida Gulf Coast 65–51 to win their first ever postseason game before they lost to the University of Florida 85–53 in the Second Round. In 2014, they won the Big South Conference tournament and won the bid to go to the NCAA Tournament, both firsts for the program. They lost 87–45 to Duke University in the First Round.

=== Lynette Woodard Era (2017–2020) ===
On March 28, 2017, Lynette Woodard was named head coach of Winthrop. The season before Woodard took over as head coach, WU was 1–17 (.056) in conference play and 2–29 (.065) overall. They also suffered the worst loss in the history of women's NCAA basketball to Baylor, losing by 108 points . During her tenure, WU improved its record to 8–28 (.285) in conference play and 13–47 (.276) overall.

Woodard was fired on March 24, 2020.

=== Semeka Randall Era (2021–present) ===
Former WNBA player and University of Tennessee alum, Semeka Randall was named head coach in April 2021.

== Facilities ==
The Lady Eagles play in Winthrop Coliseum (1982–present), a 6,100-seat multi-purpose arena in Rock Hill, South Carolina.

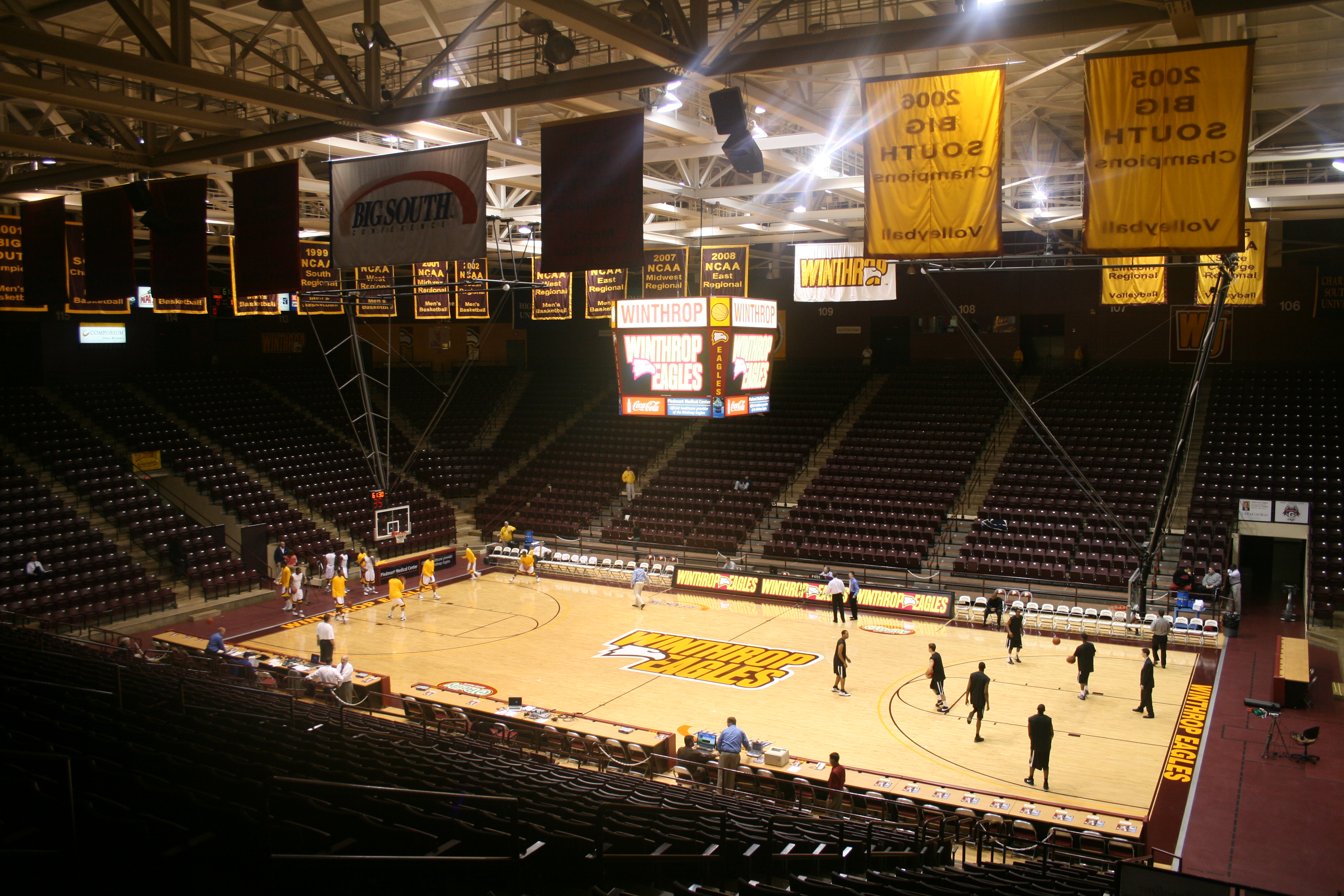
Winthrop Coliseum

== NCAA tournament results ==
Year	Seed	Round	Opponent	Result
2014	#15	First Round	#2 Duke	L 45−87

== Player awards ==
=== Big South Women's Basketball Player of the Year ===
- Dequesha McClanaahan (2012, 2013, 2014)

=== Big South Women's Basketball Freshman of the Year ===
- Katherine Kitchin (1995)
- Ashley Fann (2006)
- Dequesha McClanahan (2011)
- Schaquilla Nunn (2013)

=== Big South Women's Basketball Defensive Player of the Year ===
- Schaquilla Nunn (2015)
- Aliyah Kilpatrick (2016)

Big South Women's Basketball 2010-19 All-Decade Team

- Schaquilla Nunn
- Dequesha McClanahan

== NCAA statistical leaders ==
- In 2012, Diana Choibekova led the nation in three-point field goal average (3.9 per game).

== WNBA players ==
- Schaquilla Nunn – 25th overall pick of the 2017 WNBA Draft (San Antonio Stars)
