= Gwen Jackson =

American basketball player (born 1980)

Personal information
- Born: October 23, 1980 (age 45) Eufaula, Alabama, U.S.
- Listed height: 6 ft 3 in (1.91 m)

Career information
- High school: Eufaula (Eufaula, Alabama)
- College: Tennessee (1999–2003)
- WNBA draft: 2003: 1st round, 6th overall pick
- Drafted by: Indiana Fever
- Position: Forward

Career history
- 2003–2004: San Antonio Stars
- 2004–2005: Phoenix Mercury

Career highlights
- 2× First-team All-SEC (2001, 2003); SEC All-Freshman Team (2000); Alabama Miss Basketball (1998)
- Stats at Basketball Reference

Gwen Jackson (born October 23, 1980) is an American former professional basketball player who played for the San Antonio Silver Stars and Phoenix Mercury of the Women's National Basketball Association (WNBA). She was the sixth overall pick in the 2003 WNBA draft. She attended the University of Tennessee.

== High school ==
Jackson played for Eufaula High School in Eufaula, Alabama, where she was named a WBCA All-American. Jackson was also selected to receive the 1998 Alabama Miss Basketball award. She participated in the 1999 WBCA High School All-America Game where she scored eight points.

== Career statistics ==
=== WNBA ===
==== Regular season ====
Year	Team	GP	GS	MPG	FG%	3P%	FT%	RPG	APG	SPG	BPG	TO	PPG
2003	San Antonio	**33**	**26**	**29.5**	39.9	16.7	63.6	**6.2**	**0.6**	**0.5**	**0.5**	1.4	**8.8**
2004	San Antonio	19	4	15.3	47.9	0.0	71.4	2.8	**0.6**	0.2	0.2	0.6	3.2
2004	Phoenix	14	0	9.7	**51.1**	20.0	**81.8**	1.9	0.3	0.2	0.1	**0.3**	4.0
2005	Phoenix	11	2	11.0	50.0	**50.0**	50.0	2.1	0.3	0.0	0.3	0.9	2.8
Career	3 years, 2 teams	77	32	19.8	42.7	20.0	65.9	4.0	0.5	0.3	0.3	0.9	5.7

=== College ===
Legend
GP	Games played	GS	Games started	MPG	Minutes per game
FG%	Field goal percentage	3P%	3-point field goal percentage	FT%	Free throw percentage
RPG	Rebounds per game	APG	Assists per game	SPG	Steals per game
BPG	Blocks per game	PPG	Points per game	**Bold**	Career high

Year	Team	GP	Points	FG%	3P%	FT%	RPG	APG	SPG	BPG	PPG
1999-00	Tennessee	37	204	45.8	30.8	63.7	4.5	0.5	0.7	0.5	5.5
2000–01	Tennessee	34	397	48.6	**47.1**	78.8	**6.3**	0.8	0.6	**0.8**	11.7
2001–02	Tennessee	28	295	47.1	32.1	**80.0**	6.2	**1.0**	**1.0**	0.4	10.5
2002–03	Tennessee	**38**	**612**	**57.2**	40.0	75.6	6.2	0.9	0.8	0.6	**16.1**
Career	Tennessee	137	1508	51.2	39.3	75.0	5.7	0.8	0.8	0.6	11.0
