= Toccara =

Toccara is a given name. Notable people with the name include:

- Toccara Jones (born 1981), American television personality, fashion model, occasional actress and singer
- Toccara Montgomery (born 1982), American freestyle wrestler
- Toccara Williams, American WNBA basketball player
