= Adrienne Goodson =

American basketball player (born 1966)

Personal information
- Born: October 19, 1966 (age 60) Bayonne, New Jersey, U.S.
- Listed height: 6 ft 0 in (1.83 m)
- Listed weight: 163 lb (74 kg)

Career information
- High school: Bayonne (Bayonne, New Jersey)
- College: Old Dominion (1984–1988)
- WNBA draft: 1999: 3rd round, 27th overall pick
- Drafted by: Utah Starzz
- Position: Forward
- Number: 15, 24

Career history
- 1999–2004: Utah Starzz/San Antonio Silver Stars
- 2005: Houston Comets
- 2005: Charlotte Sting

Career highlights
- WNBA All-Star (2002)
- Stats at Basketball Reference
Medals
Women's basketball
Representing the United States
World University Games
Gold medal – first place	1993 Buffalo	Team competition

Adrienne Goodson (born October 19, 1966) is an American former basketball player, a 6-foot forward who played professionally for 14 years, in Brazil, the ABL, and the WNBA.

== Amateur basketball career ==
Born in Bayonne, New Jersey, Goodson became interested in basketball at the age of seven. She played for Bayonne High School, where she was a consensus high school All-American, named as such by Parade Magazine, Adidas, Coach, Converse, the Amateur Athletic Union, and USA Today.

She went on to attend Old Dominion University, where she graduated in 1988 with a degree in secondary education. In her freshman season there, Goodson averaged 9.5 points per game, and the team won first the Sun Belt Conference title, and then the 1985 NCAA Women's Division I Basketball Tournament. In the NCAA title game, Goodson scored nine points and hauled in six rebounds to help the Lady Monarchs defeat Georgia 70–65, as Old Dominion rolled to a 31–3 record.

During her college career, Goodson was a two-time second team All-Star performer. In 1987, she was named the Sun Belt Conference tournament's Most Valuable Player, as the Lady Monarchs won the Sun Belt Conference title again. As a Senior in 1988, she was named the Sun Belt Player of the Year.

In all, Goodson helped lead Old Dominion to three NCAA tournaments. She finished her college career with 1,574 points and 863 rebounds. She ranks 11th all-time in scoring at Old Dominion. She was inducted into the Old Dominion University Hall of Fame in 1999.

Following her graduation in 1988, Goodson captained the 1993 USA National Basketball Team.

== USA Basketball ==
Goodson was named to the team representing the US at the 1993 World University Games competition in Buffalo, New York. The team had a 6–2 record, winning the bronze medal. Goodson was the captain of the USA team, and led the team in scoring with 20 points, in the game against Russia. Goodson was the second leading scorer on the USA team, averaging 13.1 points per game over the eight games. She also led the team in steals with 15.

== Professional basketball career ==
=== In Brazil ===
No American professional women's league existed when Goodson graduated in 1988, so she played professionally in Brazil for five years. Goodson won five championships in the run-and-gun Brazilian league, learned to speak Portuguese, and left many friends behind at the end of her career there, but the lure of playing back home was too good to pass up, even with the pay cut she took.

=== In the American Basketball League (1996–1998) ===
In 1996, Goodson left a successful career in Brazil in 1996 to play in the inaugural season of the now-defunct American Basketball League (1996–1998). In the 2½ years that the ABL existed, she played for the Richmond/Philadelphia Rage, and later for the Chicago Condors.

In her first season back on American soil, Goodson continued her winning ways, helping lead the Richmond Rage to the ABL finals, where they lost to the Columbus Quest. She finished her first US pro season with averages of 17.7 points and 7.7 rebounds per game. In her second year with the Rage, which by then had moved to Philadelphia, she posted averages of 17.4 points and 8.7 rebounds, both tops on the team. The 6-foot forward earned the league's Player of the Week honors several times.

She was an ABL All-Star both years, and is one of only five players twice named to the All-ABL Team (the others in that select group are Teresa Edwards, Carolyn Jones-Young, Dawn Staley, and Natalie Williams). She ranks fourth with 1,658 career ABL points scored, and is second only to Williams in ABL career offensive rebounds, with 293. She averaged 17.5 points and 7.9 rebounds per game in the ABL.

=== In the WNBA (1999–2005) ===
Goodson was selected in the third round (27th overall) in the 1999 WNBA consolidation draft. In her seven-year WNBA career, Goodson played with the Utah Starzz (1999–2002), San Antonio Silver Stars (2002–04), and Houston Comets (2005), finishing her career with the Charlotte Sting. She averaged 12.5 points, 5.2 rebounds and 2.0 assists in her WNBA career. In 1999, she started in all but one game with Utah and averaged 14.9 points. In 2002, she was selected to the WNBA All-Star Team. She is only the third woman in the history of the WNBA to score over 4000 points with over 1500 rebounds.

She has been named the best six foot and under rebounder in the world by several basketball experts. Adrienne received the 2003 WNBA Off-Season Community Assist Award, and she continues to give back to her community. Goodson believes the strongest assets she brings to a team are her leadership ability, work ethic and dedication. Adrienne Goodson picks up her second consecutive WNBA Offseason Community Assist Award. Source:Silver Stars Photo

== Career statistics ==
Legend
GP	Games played	GS	Games started	MPG	Minutes per game	RPG	Rebounds per game
APG	Assists per game	SPG	Steals per game	BPG	Blocks per game	PPG	Points per game
TO	Turnovers per game	FG%	Field-goal percentage	3P%	3-point field-goal percentage	FT%	Free-throw percentage
**Bold**	Career best	°	League leader

=== WNBA ===
==== Regular season ====
Year	Team	GP	GS	MPG	FG%	3P%	FT%	RPG	APG	SPG	BPG	TO	PPG
1999	Utah	32	31	33.4	42.6	24.5	76.7	4.3	**2.7**	0.8	**0.3**	3.1	14.9
2000	Utah	29	28	32.0	**48.0**	27.6	68.7	5.7	2.4	**1.4**	0.2	2.8	**17.2**
2001	Utah	28	25	30.5	43.3	16.1	69.7	5.4	2.1	1.0	0.0	2.7	12.3
2002	Utah	32	32	**34.4**	45.1	28.6	74.5	5.7	2.1	**1.4**	0.2	3.2	15.7
2003	San Antonio	33	32	29.4	39.5	22.2	79.4	5.6	2.2	0.7	0.2	2.6	11.2
2004	San Antonio	**34**	**34**	31.4	44.8	25.0	**82.4**	**6.9**	1.8	0.8	0.1	2.0	10.9
2005	San Antonio	23	0	11.8	39.7	50.0	61.9	1.6	0.7	0.3	0.0	**0.7**	3.1
2005	Charlotte	10	0	19.5	42.3	**100.0**	60.0	3.5	0.6	0.3	0.1	1.8	7.0
Career	1 year, 3 teams	221	182	29.2	43.8	24.5	74.4	5.1	2.0	0.9	0.1	2.5	12.2

==== Playoffs ====
Year	Team	GP	GS	MPG	FG%	3P%	FT%	RPG	APG	SPG	BPG	TO	PPG
2001	Utah	2	2	35.5	**44.8**	0.0	55.6	**8.0**	1.5	**1.5**	**1.0**	**2.0**	**15.5**
2002	Utah	**5**	**5**	**38.0**	39.2	**28.6**	**70.6**	5.4	**1.6**	1.4	0.0	4.2	14.4
Career	2 years, 1 team	7	7	37.3	40.8	18.2	65.4	6.1	1.6	1.4	0.3	3.6	14.7

=== College ===
Year	Team	GP	GS	MPG	FG%	3P%	FT%	RPG	APG	SPG	BPG	TO	PPG
1987–88	Old Dominion	26	-	-	54.7	0.0	65.4	8.8	4.0	2.3	0.2	-	17.2
**Career**		26	-	-	54.7	0.0	65.4	8.8	4.0	2.3	0.2	-	17.2
Statistics retrieved from Sports-Reference.
