= Shell Dailey =

Shell Dailey (née Bollin; born 1963 or 1964) is an American basketball coach at IMG Academy. Before joining IMG, Dailey played on the Texas Longhorns women's basketball team during the 1980s before working in retail from 1986 to 1992. Dailey began her basketball coaching career with the TCU Horned Frogs women's basketball in 1992 as an assistant coach. After her promotion to head coach in 1993, her team competed at the Southwest Conference women's basketball tournament three times. Dailey had 8 wins and 72 losses with TCU before being replaced by Mike Petersen in 1996.

Between the late 1990s and early 2000s, Dailey held assistant coach positions for Texas A&M University, Nashville Noise and the University of South Carolina. In 2003, Dailey started her WNBA career as an assistant coach for the San Antonio Silver Stars. Between 2003 and 2005, Dailey alternated as an assistant coach and head coach for the Silver Stars. After 9 wins and 11 losses during her two head coaching tenures with San Antonio, Dailey continued her assistant coach career with the Florida Gators women's basketball team from 2005 to 2006.

== Early life and education ==
In the early 1960s, Shell Bollin was born in McKinney, Texas. After playing basketball in high school, Bollin attended the University of Texas during the 1980s for a Bachelor of Science in advertising management. While playing for the Texas Longhorns women's basketball team from 1981 to 1985, Bollin played in 108 games and scored 384 points. During these years, the Longhorns lost the 1982 AIAW National Division I Basketball Championship final. At the NCAA Division I women's basketball tournament, Bollin and the Longhorns made it to the Elite Eight from 1983 to 1984 and the Sweet Sixteen in 1985.

== Career ==
=== 1980s to early 2000s ===
After ending her post-secondary education, Shell Bollin-Robinson was a retail executive for Foley's between 1986 and 1992 while continuing to play basketball. In 1992, Bollin-Robinson started her coaching career as an assistant coach for the TCU Horned Frogs women's basketball team in 1992. The following year, Shell Robinson was promoted to head coach when Fran Garmon stepped down from her position. With TCU, Robinson's team entered the 1994 Southwest Conference women's basketball tournament and played one game. At this tournament, the team appeared in one game each during 1995 and 1996. She had 8 wins and 72 losses before being replaced by Mike Petersen in April 1996.

After leaving TCU, Robinson worked in the private sector until she became an assistant coach for Texas A&M University in August 1997. She remained at Texas A&M until 1998 before continuing her assistant coaching tenure with the Nashville Noise that year in the American Basketball League. In 1999, Robinson left the Noise for an assistant coach position with the South Carolina Gamecocks women's basketball team. With South Carolina, Robinson was part of the coaching team that reached the final eight at the 2002 NCAA Division I women's basketball tournament.

=== Early 2000s to 2010s ===
In April 2003, Dailey left South Carolina to begin her WNBA career as an assistant coach for the San Antonio Silver Stars. Later that year, Dailey was named interim coach of the Silver Stars in July 2003. At the time, Dailey took over the coaching position from Candi Harvey, whom she had previously worked with at Texas A&M and the Nashville Noise. Dailey returned to her assistant coach position in October 2003 when Dee Brown became the Silver Stars head coach. When Brown resigned from his coaching position in July 2004, Dailey ended her assistant coaching position to replace Brown the following month. During her two seasons as the Silver Stars coach, Dailey had 9 wins and 11 losses before Dan Hughes became the head coach of the Silver Stars in January 2005.

Later that year, Dailey was hired as an assistant coach for the Florida Gators women's basketball team in July 2005. While with Florida, Dailey was part of the coaching staff that reached the first round of the 2006 NCAA Division I women's basketball tournament. In 2007, Dailey did not continue her assistant coaching position with Florida. During the late 2010s, Dailey co-created a training camp for basketball players in Guam while holding coaching and directing positions at IMG Academy.

== Personal life ==
Outside of her career, Dailey is married and has one child, Eric Jr., who became a college basketball player.

== Head coaching record ==
Team	Year	G	W	L	W–L%	Finish	PG	PW	PL	PW–L%	Result
San Antonio	2003	12	6	6	.500	6th in Western	—	—	—	—	Missed playoffs
San Antonio	2004	8	3	5	.375	7th in Western	—	—	—	—	Missed playoffs
Career		20	9	11	.450		—	—	—	—	
