= LaToya Thomas =

American basketball player (born 1981)

Personal information
- Born: July 6, 1981 (age 45) Greenville, Mississippi, U.S.
- Listed height: 6 ft 2 in (1.88 m)
- Listed weight: 165 lb (75 kg)

Career information
- High school: Greenville (Greenville, Mississippi)
- College: Mississippi State (1999–2003)
- WNBA draft: 2003: 1st round, 1st overall pick
- Drafted by: Cleveland Rockers
- Playing career: 2003–2008
- Position: Forward
- Number: 32, 21

Career history
- 2003: Cleveland Rockers
- 2004–2006: San Antonio Silver Stars
- 2007: Los Angeles Sparks
- 2008: Detroit Shock
- 2008: Minnesota Lynx

Career highlights
- Senior CLASS Award (2003); 4× Kodak All-American (2000–2003); 2× All-American – USBWA (2002, 2003); 2× First-team All-American – AP (2002, 2003); Second-team All-American – AP (2001); SEC Female Athlete of the Year (2003); 2× SEC Player of the Year (2002, 2003); SEC Tournament MVP (2000); 4× First-team All-SEC (2000–2003); USBWA National Freshman of the Year (2000); SEC Freshman of the Year (2000); SEC Newcomer of the Year (2000); SEC All-Freshman Team (2000); 2× Mississippi Miss Basketball (1998, 1999)
- Stats at Basketball Reference

LaToya Monique Thomas (born July 6, 1981) is an American professional basketball player.

== College years ==
Thomas was a standout four-year starter at Mississippi State University.

Thomas was the eighth freshman in the 25-year history of Kodak All-America honors to earn the award and first Lady Bulldog to be named a Kodak All-American. She went on to become just the sixth player in women's basketball history to be a four-time Kodak All-American. She left her mark in the SEC as well, becoming the first player in the conference to lead the league in scoring all four years of her career. Thomas was a three time-finalist for the Naismith Award and she was also a four-time first team all-SEC and AP all-SEC selection. Thomas was a finalist in 2003 for the Margaret Wade Trophy given each season to the top female college player. Diana Taurasi won the Wade Trophy in 2003.

Thomas is the all-time leading scorer at Mississippi State, for either men or women, with 2,981 career points. She holds the Lady Bulldog records for field goals made, field goals attempted, field goal percentage, free throws made, free throws attempted, free throw percentage, rebounds and blocked shots.

In addition to her numerous all-America honors, Thomas was named the Lowe's Senior CLASS Award winner, 2003 Mississippi Amateur Athlete of the Year and 2003 SEC Female Athlete of the Year. Upon graduation, she became the first athlete from the state of Mississippi to be taken as a top pick in a professional draft, going No. 1 to the Cleveland Rockers in the 2003 WNBA draft.

== Mississippi State statistics ==
Legend
| GP | Games played | GS | Games started | MPG | Minutes per game |
| FG% | Field goal percentage | 3P% | 3-point field goal percentage | FT% | Free throw percentage |
| RPG | Rebounds per game | APG | Assists per game | SPG | Steals per game |
| BPG | Blocks per game | PPG | Points per game | **Bold** | Career high |

| Year | Team | GP | Points | FG% | 3P% | FT% | RPG | APG | SPG | BPG | PPG |
|---|---|---|---|---|---|---|---|---|---|---|---|
| 1999–00 | Mississippi State | **32** | 672 | **.570** | .286 | .785 | 7.9 | 1.6 | 1.4 | 1.0 | 21.0 |
| 2000–01 | Mississippi State | 31 | 752 | .548 | .200 | .736 | 8.5 | 1.4 | 1.3 | **1.1** | 24.3 |
| 2001–02 | Mississippi State | 31 | 763 | .570 | .125 | .776 | **9.9** | **2.0** | 1.4 | 0.6 | 24.6 |
| 2002–03 | Mississippi State | 31 | **794** | .528 | **.429** | **.816** | 9.1 | 1.6 | **1.6** | 0.8 | **25.6** |
| Career | | 125 | 2,981 | .553 | .309 | .776 | 8.9 | 1.6 | 1.4 | 0.9 | 23.8 |

== WNBA career ==
Thomas was selected by the Cleveland Rockers with the No. 1 overall pick in the 2003 WNBA draft. During her first WNBA season, she became the Rockers single-season rookie leader in rebounding with 164 and ranked second on the Rockers single-season rookie scoring list with 347 points. She started all three playoff games for the Rockers against Detroit, averaging 13.7 points and 7.7 rebounds in 33.3 minutes per game.

When the Cleveland franchise folded following the season, Thomas was selected No. 3 overall in the 2004 dispersal draft by the San Antonio Silver Stars, for whom she played from 2004 to 2006. She had six 20-plus point games in her first season with the Silver Stars.

On February 6, 2008 Thomas was selected in the expansion draft by the Atlanta Dream. She was later traded to the Detroit Shock along with the eighteenth pick in the 2008 WNBA draft for Ivory Latta. On June 22, 2008 Thomas was traded to the Minnesota Lynx for Eshaya Murphy.

Thomas was eventually released by the Minnesota Lynx and played outside the United States during the early part of 2009. Thomas was not listed on a WNBA roster to open the 2009 season and was also not listed on any team's roster to open the 2010 season.

== WNBA career statistics ==
Legend
| GP | Games played | GS | Games started | MPG | Minutes per game | RPG | Rebounds per game |
| APG | Assists per game | SPG | Steals per game | BPG | Blocks per game | PPG | Points per game |
| TO | Turnovers per game | FG% | Field-goal percentage | 3P% | 3-point field-goal percentage | FT% | Free-throw percentage |
| **Bold** | Career best | ° | League leader |

=== Regular season ===
| Year | Team | GP | GS | MPG | FG% | 3P% | FT% | RPG | APG | SPG | BPG | TO | PPG |
|---|---|---|---|---|---|---|---|---|---|---|---|---|---|
| 2003 | Cleveland | **32** | **25** | 26.6 | .463 | .000 | .789 | **5.1** | 1.2 | **0.9** | **0.4** | 1.3 | 10.8 |
| 2004 | San Antonio | 31 | 30 | **31.1** | .489 | .475 | .841 | 4.5 | **1.4** | 0.8 | **0.4** | 1.8 | **14.2** |
| 2005 | San Antonio | 21 | 12 | 24.0 | .429 | .429 | **.898** | 3.2 | 1.0 | 0.3 | **0.4** | 1.6 | 8.8 |
| 2006 | San Antonio | 19 | 0 | 19.4 | .452 | .000 | .763 | 4.3 | 1.2 | 0.7 | **0.4** | 1.4 | 8.3 |
| 2007 | Los Angeles | 27 | 7 | 18.0 | .443 | .421 | .826 | 2.3 | 1.2 | 0.3 | 0.3 | 1.1 | 7.7 |
| 2008 | Detroit | 7 | 0 | 5.7 | .267 | .000 | .000 | 0.7 | 0.1 | 0.1 | 0.1 | 0.3 | 1.1 |
| 2008 | Minnesota | 13 | 0 | 11.3 | **.500** | **.714** | .444 | 1.9 | 0.2 | 0.2 | 0.0 | 1.4 | 3.6 |
| Career | 6 years, 5 teams | 150 | 74 | 22.4 | .460 | .397 | .811 | 3.6 | 1.1 | 0.6 | 0.3 | 1.4 | 9.3 |

=== Playoffs ===
| Year | Team | GP | GS | MPG | FG% | 3P% | FT% | RPG | APG | SPG | BPG | TO | PPG |
|---|---|---|---|---|---|---|---|---|---|---|---|---|---|
| 2003 | Cleveland | 3 | 3 | 33.3 | .438 | .000 | .765 | 7.7 | 1.3 | 0.3 | 1.3 | 2.0 | 13.7 |
| Career | 1 year, 1 team | 3 | 3 | 33.3 | .438 | .000 | .765 | 7.7 | 1.3 | 0.3 | 1.3 | 2.0 | 13.7 |

== Other professional experience ==
- 2012-14 : playing with Altay Konak (Turkey 2nd League)
- 2011-12 : played with Mersin (Turkish Pro League)
- 2010-11 : played with Raanana Hertzeliya (Israel Pro League) and Burhaniye Belediyesi (Turkish Pro League)
- 2009-10 : played with Jerusalem (Israel Pro League)
- 2008-09 : played with Zaragoza (Spanish Pro League)
- 2006-07 : played with Ensino (Spanish Pro League) and Elitzur Ramla (Israel Pro League)
- 2006 : played with Montpellier (French Pro League) and Cadi (Spanish Pro League)
- 2005 : played with Kazan (Russian Pro League)
- 2004–05: Spent part of the off-season playing in Russia for BC Enge Kazan in the FIBA Europe Cup.
- 2003–04: Spent the off-season playing in Korea for the Hyundai Hyperion.

== See also ==
- List of NCAA Division I women's basketball players with 2,500 points and 1,000 rebounds
- List of NCAA Division I women's basketball career scoring leaders
