= Naomi Mulitauaopele =

American basketball player

Personal information
- Born: March 6, 1976 (age 50) Seattle, Washington, U.S.
- Listed height: 6 ft 3 in (1.91 m)

Career information
- High school: Chief Sealth (Seattle, Washington)
- College: Stanford
- WNBA draft: 2000: 1st round, 12th overall pick
- Drafted by: Utah Starzz
- Position: Center
- Number: 34

Career history
- ?–?: Seattle Reign
- 2000: Utah Starzz
- Stats at Basketball Reference
- Stats at Basketball Reference

Naomi Mulitauaopele (born March 6, 1976) is an American former professional basketball player.

== High school ==
Mulitauaopele played basketball at Chief Sealth International High School in Seattle, Washington. Coming out of high school, she was considered the state's top player.

== Career stats ==
Legend
GP	Games played	GS	Games started	MPG	Minutes per game	RPG	Rebounds per game
APG	Assists per game	SPG	Steals per game	BPG	Blocks per game	PPG	Points per game
TO	Turnovers per game	FG%	Field-goal percentage	3P%	3-point field-goal percentage	FT%	Free-throw percentage
**Bold**	Career best	°	League leader

=== WNBA ===
==== Regular season ====
Year	Team	GP	GS	MPG	FG%	3P%	FT%	RPG	APG	SPG	BPG	TO	PPG
2000	Utah	22	3	13.2	.594	.667	.750	1.5	.3	.2	.3	1.4	4.5

=== College ===
Year	Team	GP	GS	MPG	FG%	3P%	FT%	RPG	APG	SPG	BPG	TO	PPG
1994–95	Stanford	**33**	-	-	58.2	0.0	63.0	3.0	0.6	0.5	0.6	-	7.3
1995–96	Stanford	32	-	-	49.5	0.0	**74.8**	5.5	0.8	**0.9**	0.4	-	**11.9**
1996–97	Stanford	26	-	-	**99.1**	0.0	67.7	5.5	**0.9**	0.5	**0.8**	-	10.2
**Career**		91	-	-	62.0	0.0	70.7	4.6	0.8	0.6	0.6	-	9.7
Statistics retrieved from Sports-Reference.

== International career ==
After the WNBA, Mulitauaopele played professionally in Turkey, Korea, and Spain.

== Personal life ==
Mulitauaopele is the niece of Manu Tuiasosopo, a former NFL player.
