= 2004 San Antonio Silver Stars season =

- Head coach: Dee Brown; Shell Dailey (interim)
- Arena: SBC Center

Results
- Record: 9–25 (.265)
- Place: 7th (Western)
- Playoff finish: Did not qualify

The 2004 WNBA season was the 8th season for the San Antonio Silver Stars franchise. The team came last in the league with a 9–25 record.

== Offseason ==
=== Dispersal Draft ===
Based on the Silver Stars' 2003 record, they would pick 3rd in the Cleveland Rockers dispersal draft. The Silver Stars picked LaToya Thomas.

=== WNBA draft ===
Round	Pick	Player	Nationality	College/School/Team
2	21	Cindy Dallas (F)	United States	Illinois
3	34	Toccara Williams (G)	United States	Texas A&M

== Regular season ==
=== Season standings ===
Western Conference	W	L	PCT	GB	Home	Road	Conf.
Los Angeles Sparks ^{x}	25	9	.735	–	15–2	10–7	16–6
Seattle Storm ^{x}	20	14	.588	5.0	13–4	7–10	13–9
Minnesota Lynx ^{x}	18	16	.529	7.0	11–6	7–10	12–10
Sacramento Monarchs ^{x}	18	16	.529	7.0	10–7	8–9	12–10
Phoenix Mercury ^{o}	17	17	.500	8.0	10–7	7–10	11–11
Houston Comets ^{o}	13	21	.382	12.0	9–8	4–13	7–15
San Antonio Silver Stars ^{o}	9	25	.265	16.0	6–11	3–14	6–16

=== Season schedule ===
Date	Opponent	Score	Result	Record
May 20	@ Houston	64-55	Win	1-0
May 22	Detroit	60-73	Loss	1-1
May 26	Minnesota	56-44	Win	2-1
May 28	Sacramento	72-63	Win	3-1
June 1	Indiana	60-79	Loss	3-2
June 3	@ Minnesota	47-55	Loss	3-3
June 5	New York	57-62	Loss	3-4
June 9	@ Houston	47-59	Loss	3-5
June 12	Houston	66-69 (OT)	Loss	3-6
June 15	@ Charlotte	57-59	Loss	3-7
June 17	@ Washington	60-76	Loss	3-8
June 19	Seattle	61-74	Loss	3-9
June 24	Minnesota	70-57	Win	4-9
June 26	@ Phoenix	80-72 (OT)	Win	5-9
June 29	Phoenix	65-77	Loss	5-10
July 1	@ Seattle	52-76	Loss	5-11
July 2	@ Los Angeles	80-87 (OT)	Loss	5-12
July 9	Los Angeles	61-66	Loss	5-13
July 12	@ Seattle	59-75	Loss	5-14
July 15	Connecticut	78-67	Win	6-14
July 18	@ Detroit	71-77	Loss	6-15
July 21	@ Phoenix	55-87	Loss	6-16
July 24	@ Connecticut	55-69	Loss	6-17
July 28	@ Minnesota	53-66	Loss	6-18
July 30	Phoenix	59-68	Loss	6-19
July 31	Los Angeles	67-79	Loss	6-20
September 1	@ Los Angeles	69-77	Loss	6-21
September 2	@ Sacramento	64-66	Loss	6-22
September 4	Sacramento	70-80	Loss	6-23
September 9	Houston	77-72	Win	7-23
September 10	@ Indiana	82-65	Win	8-23
September 12	@ New York	62-64	Loss	8-24
September 15	Washington	73-84	Loss	8-25
September 17	Charlotte	82-65	Win	9-25

== Player stats ==
Note: GP = Games played; REB = Rebounds; AST = Assists; STL = Steals; BLK = Blocks; PTS = Points

Player	GP	REB	AST	STL	BLK	PTS
LaToya Thomas	31	138	42	25	11	440
Adrienne Goodson	34	235	60	28	2	372
Shannon Johnson	31	82	136	48	4	287
Margo Dydek	34	168	60	20	48	225
Marie Ferdinand-Harris	17	54	29	32	2	199
Agnieszka Bibrzycka	24	28	40	21	7	159
Semeka Randall	29	60	20	22	4	136
Jessie Hicks	27	57	18	17	13	127
Gwen Jackson	19	54	11	3	3	61
Toccara Williams	26	39	43	35	5	55
Mandisa Stevenson	29	35	5	6	4	38
Tai Dillard	23	14	19	4	1	37
Adrian Williams-Strong	12	28	8	8	1	32
Nevriye Yılmaz	7	10	2	3	1	19
Jocelyn Penn	1	1	0	0	0	4
