= Katryna Gaither =

American basketball player (born 1975)

Personal information
- Born: August 13, 1975 (age 51)
- Listed height: 6 ft 4 in (1.93 m)

Career information
- College: Notre Dame (1993–1997)
- WNBA draft: 2023: 2nd round, 19th overall pick
- Drafted by: Dallas Wings
- Position: Forward-center

Career history
- 1997-1999: San Jose Lasers
- 2000: Utah Starzz
- 2000: Indiana Fever
- 2002: Los Angeles Sparks
- 2002: Washington Mystics

Career highlights
- 2x First-team All-Big East (1996, 1997); First-team All-Horizon (1995)
- Stats at Basketball Reference
Medals
Women's basketball
Representing the United States
Pan American Games
Bronze medal – third place	1999 Winnipeg	Team

Katryna Renée Gaither (born August 13, 1975) is a professional women's basketball player.

Gaither attended college at Notre Dame. She ranks forth on the school's all-time scoring list with 2,126 career points. She is only one of the five players in school history to have scored over 2,000 points. Additionally, she is the school's third leading rebounder with 986 rebounds.

== Career ==
=== College ===
- 1993-1997: Notre Dame Fighting Irish (NCAA)

=== ABL ===
- 1997-1999: San Jose Lasers

=== WNBA ===
- 2000: Utah Starzz
- 2000: Indiana Fever
- 2002: Los Angeles Sparks
- 2002: Washington Mystics

=== Asia ===
- 2001: (South Korea) Hanvit

=== Europe ===
- 1998-1999: (Spain) CB Navarra
- 1999-2000: (Italy) Becast Vicenza
- 2000-2001: (Turkey) Brisaspor İzmit
- 2002-2003: (Hungary) DKSK Miskolc
- 2003-2006: (France) Tarbes GB
- 2006-2007: (Belgium) Dexia Namur
- March 2007: "Rest of the World" at the EuroLeague Women All-Star Game
- 2007-2008: (Russia) Dynamo Energie
- 2008-2009: (Italy) ACP Livorno

=== USA Basketball ===
Gaither was named to the team representing the US at the 1999 Pan American Games. The team finished with a record of 4–3, but managed to win the bronze medal with an 85–59 victory over Brazil. Gaither averaged 1.2 points per game.

== Career statistics ==
Legend
GP	Games played	GS	Games started	MPG	Minutes per game	RPG	Rebounds per game
APG	Assists per game	SPG	Steals per game	BPG	Blocks per game	PPG	Points per game
TO	Turnovers per game	FG%	Field-goal percentage	3P%	3-point field-goal percentage	FT%	Free-throw percentage
**Bold**	Career best	°	League leader

=== WNBA career statistics ===
Legend
GP	Games played	GS	Games started	MPG	Minutes per game	RPG	Rebounds per game
APG	Assists per game	SPG	Steals per game	BPG	Blocks per game	PPG	Points per game
TO	Turnovers per game	FG%	Field-goal percentage	3P%	3-point field-goal percentage	FT%	Free-throw percentage
**Bold**	Career best	°	League leader

==== Regular season ====
Year	Team	GP	GS	MPG	FG%	3P%	FT%	RPG	APG	SPG	BPG	TO	PPG
2000	Utah	**9**	0	**6.0**	28.6	0.0	**100.0**	**1.9**	0.4	**0.4**	0.0	0.4	**1.6**
2000	Indiana	6	0	4.0	**37.5**	0.0	0.0	0.5	0.2	0.0	**0.2**	**0.2**	1.0
20002	Los Angeles	1	0	5.0	0.0	0.0	0.0	1.0	**1.0**	0.0	0.0	1.0	0.0
20002	Washington	1	0	1.0	0.0	0.0	0.0	0.0	0.0	0.0	0.0	1.0	0.0
Career	2 years, 4 teams	17	0	4.9	31.3	0.0	100.0	1.2	0.4	0.2	0.1	0.4	1.2

=== College ===
Year	Team	GP	GS	MPG	FG%	3P%	FT%	RPG	APG	SPG	BPG	TO	PPG
1993–94	Notre Dame	28	-	-	55.4	0.0	48.9	3.4	0.0	0.5	0.7	-	5.3
1994–95	Notre Dame	31	-	-	62.1	0.0	51.5	7.7	**1.1**	1.8	**1.5**	-	19.0
1995–96	Notre Dame	31	-	-	**63.3**	0.0	58.0	9.1	0.9	2.0	1.3	-	19.8
1996–97	Notre Dame	**38**	-	-	59.6	0.0	**71.1**	**9.7**	0.9	2.0	0.9	-	**20.4**
**Career**		128	-	-	61.0	0.0	59.5	7.7	0.8	1.6	1.1	-	16.6
Statistics retrieved from Sports-Reference.
