= Semeka Randall Lay =

American basketball player and coach (born 1979)

Semeka Randall-Lay
Winthrop Eagles
- Title: Head coach
- League: Big South Conference

Personal information
- Born: February 7, 1979 (age 47) Cleveland, Ohio, U.S.

Career information
- High school: Trinity (Garfield Heights, Ohio)
- College: Tennessee (1996–2000)
- WNBA draft: 2001: 17th
- Drafted by: Seattle Storm
- Position: Guard

Career history

Playing
- 2001: Seattle Storm
- 2002: Utah Starzz
- 2003: San Antonio Stars

Career highlights
- NCAA champion (1998); 2× Second-team All-American – AP (1999, 2000); All-American – USBWA (1999); 2× Kodak All-American (1999, 2000); 2× First-team All-SEC (1999, 2000); SEC All-Freshman Team (1998)
- Stats at Basketball Reference
Medals
FIBA Under-19 World Cup
Gold medal – first place	1997 Brazil	Team
FIBA Under-18 Americas Championship
Silver medal – second place	1996 Mexico	Team
Jones Cup
Gold medal – first place	1998 Jones Cup Taipei, Taiwan	Team competition

Semeka Chantay Randall-Lay (born February 7, 1979) is the current head coach for the Winthrop Eagles women's basketball team. She is also a former collegiate and professional basketball player. She was hired as recruiting coordinator at Wright State in June 2016 after serving as the head coach of the Alabama A&M University women's basketball team for three years. Randall was also head coach of the Ohio Bobcats, from 2008 to 2013. She previously served as an assistant coach of the women's basketball teams at West Virginia University, Michigan State University, and Cleveland State University.

== Early life ==
She attended Trinity High School in Garfield Heights, Ohio, where she starred in basketball until 1996. Randall was named a WBCA All-American. She participated in the WBCA High School All-America Game where she scored seventeen points.

== College career ==
She was a member of the University of Tennessee women's basketball team, the Lady Vols, which won the NCAA Women's Division I Basketball Championship in 1998, with a perfect 39–0 won-loss record.

She was one of the three star players on the team collectively known as "The Three Meeks": Randall, Chamique Holdsclaw, and Tamika Catchings. Her reputation as a standout defensive player won her the nickname "Hard to Handle Randall". A game at UConn where the Huskies' fans booed her relentlessly earned her the nickname "Boo".

She was named on the Kodak All-American First Team in (1999–2000), and to the Associated Press All-American Second Team in (1999, 2000).

She graduated in December 2000, a semester ahead of her class, with a Bachelor's Degree in Speech Communications.

== USA Basketball ==
Randall was named to the USA Basketball Women's Junior National Team (now called the U18 team). The team participated in the third Junior World Championship Qualifying Tournament, held in Chetumal, Mexico in late August and early September 1996. The USA team won their early games easily, but lost by four points to the team from Brazil, ending up with the silver medal for the event, which qualified the USA for the 1997 FIBA Junior World Championship

Randall was named to the USA Basketball Women's Junior National Team, which competed in the 1997 FIBA Junior World Championship (now called U19) held in Natal, Brazil. After beating Japan, the next game was against Australia, the defending champion. The USA team pulled out to a 13-point lead in the second half, but gave up the lead and lost the game 80–74. The USA rebounded with a close 92–88 victory over Cuba, helped by 23 points each from Maylana Martin and Lynn Pride. The USA then went on to beat previously unbeaten Russia. After winning the next two games, the USA faced Australia in the gold medal game. The USA team has a three-point lead late, but the Aussies hit a 3-pointer with three seconds left in regulation to force overtime. Although the Aussies scored first, the USA team came back, then pulled into the lead and held on to win 78–74 to earn the gold, and the first medal for a USA team at a Junior World Championship. Randall was injured and unable to play in the event.

Randall was named to the team representing the USA at the 1998 William Jones Cup competition in Taipei, Taiwan. The USA team, coached by Nell Fortner, won all five games, earning the gold medal for the competition. Randall was the leading scorer on the team, averaging 10.6 points per game.

== WNBA career ==
Randall joined the Women's National Basketball Association (WNBA) after being selected by the Seattle Storm in the second round (17th pick overall) of the 2001 WNBA draft. Her debut game was played on May 31, 2001 in a 83 - 70 win over the Phoenix Mercury. In her debut, Randall recorded 13 points, 4 rebounds, 2 assists and 1 steal.

In her rookie season as a consistent started with the Storm, Randall averaged 9.4 points, 3.3 rebounds and 1.4 assists in 32 games.

After playing 21 games and averaging 6.4 points, 3.2 rebounds and 1.4 assists per game for the Storm in her sophomore season, she was traded to the Utah Starzz in exchange for Kate Starbird on July 23, 2002.

She remained with the Starzz franchise when the team relocated to San Antonio, Texas, and changed its name to the San Antonio Silver Stars for the 2003 season.

Randall's final WNBA game was played on September 17, 2004 in a 82 - 65 win over the Charlotte Sting. In her last game, Randall set the Silver Stars single player record for most steals in a game where she record 8 of them. She also recorded 6 points, 4 rebounds and 2 assists in that game. This record would be tied 22 months later on July 3, 2006 by Shannon Johnson where Johnson recorded 8 steals in a 85 - 63 win over the Los Angeles Sparks. As of the 2025 WNBA season, Randall and Johnson still hold this record (even with including the Silver Stars future change to the Las Vegas Aces).

=== Post-WNBA ===
After her final game, Randall announced that she would be retiring from the WNBA to take an assistant coaching job at Michigan State University. She coached there from April 2004 to April 2007 and then moved on to be a head coach and assistant coach for various universities. These positions include assistant coach for West Virginia University (April 2007 - April 2008), head coach for Ohio University (April 2008 - March 2013), head coach for Alabama Agricultural and Mechanical University (May 2013 - April 2016), assistant coach for Wright State University (April 2016 - April 2018) and assistant coach for University of Cincinnati (April 2018 - January 2019).

== Overseas and the NWBL ==
Like most WNBA players during the off-season, Randall kept playing basketball in international leagues.

In 2001–02, Randall started all 16 games at point guard and averaged 19 points while playing for the Israeli Professional Basketball League.

The following year, she played in the Greek Professional Basketball League, again starting all 16 games for her squad.

In 2003, she was a member of the Tennessee Fury of the National Women's Basketball League, averaging 12.2 points as a shooting guard.

== Coaching career ==
Randall's first coaching job was an assistant coach for the women's basketball team at Cleveland State University, during the 2002–03 season. On September 17, 2004, Michigan State University (MSU) announced that Randall was hired as an assistant coach. During that season, the MSU team made it all the way to the NCAA Women's Division I Basketball Championship game, only to lose to Baylor University. On April 17, 2007, Randall was hired as an assistant coach at West Virginia University.

She was named head coach of the Ohio Bobcats women's basketball team on May 9, 2008. Upon her hiring, she stated: "It is my dream job to coach in the state of Ohio. If you look at my previous coaching experiences, you'll see that I've always positioned myself around this state because it's a great place for women's basketball. Ohio is a great school. I like that it urges student-athletes to excel in the classroom and on the court. It's just a great place and I'm looking forward to becoming part of the Ohio basketball family and the Athens community!" Jim Schaus, Athletic Director of Ohio University, described her hiring as "a winning half-court shot at the buzzer."

On March 10, 2013, Randall was released from the Ohio coaching staff where she held a five-year record of 50–103; during her fifth year as head coach, Semeka held a record of 6–23, going 1–15 in the Mid American Conference (MAC).

In May 2013, Randall was named as the new head coach of the Alabama A&M Lady Bulldogs basketball team.

Randall is currently the head coach for the women's program at Winthrop University in Rock Hill, South Carolina.

== Awards ==
- Ohio Ms. Basketball (1996, 1997) awarded by Ohio High School Basketball Coaches Association

== Career statistics ==
Legend
GP	Games played	GS	Games started	MPG	Minutes per game	RPG	Rebounds per game
APG	Assists per game	SPG	Steals per game	BPG	Blocks per game	PPG	Points per game
TO	Turnovers per game	FG%	Field-goal percentage	3P%	3-point field-goal percentage	FT%	Free-throw percentage
**Bold**	Career best	°	League leader

=== WNBA ===
==== Regular season ====
WNBA regular season statistics
Year	Team	GP	GS	MPG	FG%	3P%	FT%	RPG	APG	SPG	BPG	TO	PPG
2001	Seattle	32	**30**	**27.6**	37.1	0.0	66.0	**3.3**	**1.4**	0.9	**0.1**	2.3	**9.4**
2002	Seattle	21	16	21.8	35.3	**21.1**	70.6	3.2	**1.4**	**1.0**	0.0	1.7	6.4
2002	Utah	8	0	16.9	**45.0**	0.0	**75.9**	2.6	1.0	0.5	**0.1**	1.3	7.3
2003	San Antonio	**33**	1	10.3	35.6	0.0	53.3	1.6	0.7	0.3	0.0	1.3	2.7
2004	San Antonio	29	8	15.9	37.1	0.0	62.5	2.1	0.7	0.8	**0.1**	**1.0**	4.7
**Career**	4 years, 2 teams	123	55	18.5	37.0	12.9	65.2	2.5	1.0	0.7	0.1	1.6	5.8

==== Playoffs ====
WNBA playoffs statistics
Year	Team	GP	GS	MPG	FG%	3P%	FT%	RPG	APG	SPG	BPG	TO	PPG
2002	Utah	5	0	12.4	36.4	0.0	80.0	2.4	1.0	0.2	0.0	0.6	4.0
**Career**	1 year, 1 team	5	0	12.4	36.4	0.0	80.0	2.4	1.0	0.2	0.0	0.6	4.0

=== College ===
NCAA statistics
Year	Team	GP	GS	MPG	FG%	3P%	FT%	RPG	APG	SPG	BPG	TO	PPG
1997–98	Tennessee	**38**	-	-	48.7	9.1	72.8	**5.3**	1.3	**2.7**	0.1	-	**15.9**
1998–99	Tennessee	33	-	-	**51.2**	25.0	59.0	4.8	1.4	1.8	**0.2**	-	14.1
1999–00	Tennessee	37	-	-	41.8	**25.7**	**78.5**	**5.3**	1.9	1.9	0.1	-	14.0
2000–01	Tennessee	32	-	-	41.7	15.4	71.3	5.0	**2.2**	1.6	0.1	-	10.3
**Career**		140	-	-	46.0	20.9	71.0	5.1	1.7	2.0	0.1	-	13.7

== Head coaching record ==
- Winthrop
- Big South

Record table
Season	Team	Overall	Conference	Standing	Postseason
Ohio Bobcats (Mid-American Conference) (2008–2013)
2008–09	Ohio	13–18	7–9	7th	
2009–10	Ohio	8–22	4–12	9th	
2010–11	Ohio	9–22	4–12	8th	
2011–12	Ohio	14–18	6–10	8th	
2012–13	Ohio	6–23	1–15	11th	
Ohio:		50–103 (.327)	22–58 (.275)		
Alabama A&M Lady Bulldogs (Southwestern Athletic Conference) (2013–2016)
2013–14	Alabama A&M	6–24	3–15	9th	
2014–15	Alabama A&M	6–24	5–13	9th	
2015–16	Alabama A&M	5–25	3–15	9th	
Alabama A&M:		17–73 (.189)	11–43 (.204)		
Winthrop Eagles (Big South Conference) (2020–present)
2020–21	Winthrop	6–18	5–15	8th	
2021–22	Winthrop	6–24	4–14	9th	
2022–23	Winthrop	8–22	6–12	9th	
2023–24	Winthrop	14–16	8–8	T–4th	
2024–25	Winthrop	16–15	9–7	5th	
2025–26	Winthrop	15–17	7–9	T–5th	
Winthrop:		65–112 (.367)	39–65 (.375)		
Total:		132–288 (.314)			
National champion Postseason invitational champion Conference regular season champion Conference regular season and conference tournament champion Division regular season champion Division regular season and conference tournament champion Conference tournament champion
