= Toccara Williams =

American basketball player

Personal information
- Born: January 11, 1982 (age 44) Hollywood, Florida, U.S.
- Listed height: 5 ft 9 in (1.75 m)

Career information
- High school: South Broward (Hollywood, Florida)
- College: Texas A&M (2000–2004)
- WNBA draft: 2004: 3rd round, 34th overall pick
- Drafted by: San Antonio Silver Stars
- Position: Point guard

Career history
- 2004: San Antonio Silver Stars

Career highlights
- First-team All-Big 12 (2004)
- Stats at Basketball Reference

Toccara Williams is a former basketball point guard who played for the WNBA's San Antonio Silver Stars in the 2004 season. Prior to playing in the WNBA, she played college basketball at Texas A&M from 2000 to 2004. In her senior year, she led the nation for steals per game among Division I teams with an average of 4.1 steals per game. She was then selected in the third round of the 2004 WNBA draft. Toccara also played professionally overseas in Turkey, Korea, China, and Israel. Williams now has a non profit organization called Sweet Rebound that is geared towards the youth by utilizing sports as a platform for education.

She is one of only two NCAA Division I women's players to have recorded a steal in each game of her career, and is the only one of the two to have also recorded an assist in each of her college games.

== Career statistics ==
=== WNBA ===
Legend
GP	Games played	GS	Games started	MPG	Minutes per game	RPG	Rebounds per game
APG	Assists per game	SPG	Steals per game	BPG	Blocks per game	PPG	Points per game
TO	Turnovers per game	FG%	Field-goal percentage	3P%	3-point field-goal percentage	FT%	Free-throw percentage
**Bold**	Career best	°	League leader

==== Regular season ====
Year	Team	GP	GS	MPG	FG%	3P%	FT%	RPG	APG	SPG	BPG	TO	PPG
2004	San Antonio	26	4	16.0	34.8	50.0	75.9	1.5	1.7	1.3	0.2	1.2	2.1
Career	1 year, 1 team	26	4	16.0	34.8	50.0	75.9	1.5	1.7	1.3	0.2	1.2	2.1

=== College ===
Legend
GP	Games played	GS	Games started	MPG	Minutes per game
FG%	Field goal percentage	3P%	3-point field goal percentage	FT%	Free throw percentage
RPG	Rebounds per game	APG	Assists per game	SPG	Steals per game
BPG	Blocks per game	PPG	Points per game	**Bold**	Career high

Year	Team	GP	Points	FG%	3P%	FT%	RPG	APG	SPG	BPG	PPG
2000-01	Texas A&M	28	235	.372	**.310**	.605	4.8	7.0	3.8	0.2	8.4
2001-02	Texas A&M	**29**	313	**.430**	.217	.613	5.5	6.4	4.0	0.4	10.8
2002-03	Texas A&M	27	333	.409	.065	**.703**	5.1	5.5	**4.3**	0.4	12.3
2003-04	Texas A&M	27	**421**	.345	.200	.677	**5.6**	**7.1**	4.1	0.3	**15.6**
Career		111	1302	.384	.198	.659	5.2	6.5	4.1	0.3	11.7
