= Jennifer Azzi =

American basketball player and coach (born 1968)

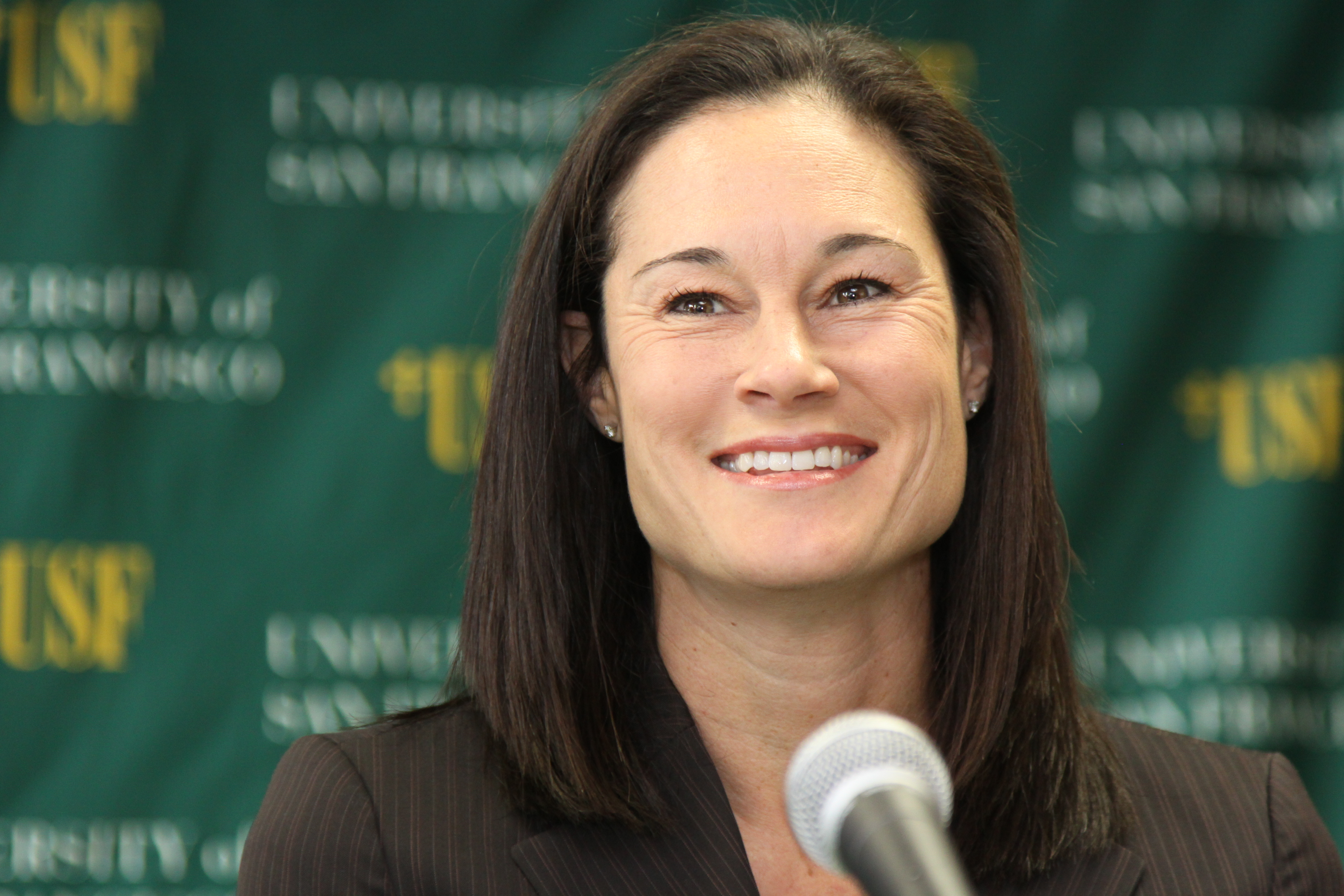
- Azzi as the coach of University of San Francisco

Personal information
- Born: August 31, 1968 (age 58) Oak Ridge, Tennessee, U.S.
- Listed height: 5 ft 8 in (1.73 m)
- Listed weight: 143 lb (65 kg)

Career information
- High school: Oak Ridge (Oak Ridge, Tennessee)
- College: Stanford (1986–1990)
- WNBA draft: 1999: 1st round, 5th overall pick
- Drafted by: Detroit Shock
- Playing career: 1990–2003
- Position: Point guard
- Number: 8

Career history

Playing
- 1990–1991: SISV Viterbo
- 1991–1993: US Valenciennes-Orchies
- 1993–1995: Arvika Basket
- 1996–1998: San Jose Lasers
- 1999: Detroit Shock
- 2000–2003: Utah Starzz/San Antonio Silver Stars

Career highlights
- Honda Sports Award (1990); Naismith College Player of the Year (1990); Wade Trophy (1990); USBWA National Player of the Year (1990); NCAA Tournament MOP (1990); NCAA champion (1990); 2× Pac-10 Player of the Year (1989, 1990); 2× Kodak All-American (1989, 1990); All-American – USBWA (1990); 3× First-team All Pac-10 (1988–1990)
- Stats at WNBA.com
- Stats at Basketball Reference
- Women's Basketball Hall of Fame
Medals
Representing United States
Women's basketball
Olympic Games
| Gold medal – first place | 1996 Atlanta | Team competition |
FIBA World Championship
| Gold medal – first place | 1990 Malaysia | Team competition |
| Gold medal – first place | 1998 Germany | Team Competition |
| Bronze medal – third place | 1994 Australia | Team Competition |
Pan American Games
| Bronze medal – third place | 1991 Havana | Team |
Jones Cup
| Silver medal – second place | 1988 Taipei | Team Competition |

Jennifer Lynn Azzi (/ˈeɪziː/ AY-zee; born August 31, 1968), is an American business development officer and former basketball player and coach. Most recently, she was the chief business development officer for the Las Vegas Aces from 2021–2025.

Azzi played collegiate basketball at Stanford, where she was national player of the year and won the NCAA national championship in 1990. She played professional basketball from 1990–2003, including five seasons in the WNBA. She was the coach of the University of San Francisco women's basketball team from 2010–2016. Azzi was inducted into the Women's Basketball Hall of Fame in 2009, and was inducted into the Naismith Basketball Hall of Fame in 2026 as a member of the 1996 United States women's Olympic basketball team.

== Early life and education ==
Azzi was born on August 31, 1968, in Oak Ridge, Tennessee. After receiving a scholarship, Azzi attended Stanford University in 1986 to study economics and graduated with a bachelor's degree in 1990.

== Basketball career ==
=== College ===
Azzi played point guard for Stanford University's women's basketball team from 1986 to 1990. During her four years at Stanford, the Cardinal compiled a 101–23 win–loss record, and captured two Pac-10 titles.

During her senior year (1990), Azzi helped lead the Cardinal to the NCAA Women's Division I Basketball Championship, defeating Auburn. Azzi was named the Most Outstanding Player in the tournament. For the season, Azzi won the Honda Sports Award, the Wade Trophy, and was the Naismith College Player of the Year and the USBWA Women's National Player of the Year.

=== ABL ===
Azzi began her professional basketball career in Europe, where she played for teams in Italy, France, and Sweden. When she returned in the United States, she joined the San Jose Lasers of the American Basketball League (ABL) from 1996 to 1999. She was one of the cofounders of the league. Her participation in the league ended when the ABL declared bankruptcy on December 22, 1998.

=== WNBA ===
In 1999, Azzi was selected by the Detroit Shock in the first round (fifth overall) in the WNBA draft. She helped lead the Shock into the playoffs that year.

Just before the 2000 season, Azzi was traded to the Utah Starzz. She remained with the team when the franchise relocated to San Antonio, Texas and changed its name to the San Antonio Silver Stars in 2003. She led the WNBA twice in three-point percentage, in both 1999 and 2001, and led the league in free-throw percentage in 2000.

In February 2004, Azzi announced her retirement from professional basketball.

=== International career ===
In 1988, Azzi was named to the Jones Cup team. The USA team ended the competition with a 3–2 record, winning the silver medal. Azzi averaged 5.4 points per game.

Azzi was a member of the US national team at the 1990 World Championships, held in Kuala Lumpur, Malaysia. The team won their opening round games easily, with the closest of the first three games a 27-point victory over Czechoslovakia. Then they faced Cuba, a team that had beaten the US in exhibition matches only a few weeks earlier. The USA team was losing at halftime, but came back to win 87–78. The USA team was behind at halftime to Canada in their next game, but came back to win 95–70. After an easy match against Bulgaria, in which Azzi hit three of four three-pointers, and scored a team high 13 points, the USA team faced Czechoslovakia again, and achieved an almost identical result, winning 87–59. In the title match, the USA team won the gold medal with a score of 88–78. Azzi averaged 4.6 points per game, and recorded 15 assists, second highest on the team.

Azzi played with the USA at the 1991 Pan American Games. The team finished with a record of 4–2, winning the bronze medal. The US team lost a three-point game to Brazil, then responded with wins over Argentina and Cuba, earning a spot in the medal round. The next game was a rematch against Cuba, and this time the Cubans won by five points. The USA beat Canada easily to win the bronze. Azzi averaged 6.7 points per game.

Azzi was a member of the gold medal-winning U.S. women's basketball team at the 1994 Goodwill Games, which was held in Saint Petersburg, Russia.

Azzi competed in the 1994 World Championships, held in June 1994 in Sydney, Australia. The team was coached by Tara VanDerveer, and won their first six games. In a closely contested, high-scoring game in the semi-finals, Brazil hit ten of ten free throws in the final minute to secure a 110–107 victory. The USA won a close final game against Australia 100–95 to earn the bronze medal. Azzi averaged 4.9 points per game, while recording 16 assists, third highest on the team.

Azzi played for the US in a five-game Australian tour event in 1998, as part of the Goldmark Cup team. The USA and Australian teams had qualified for the 2000 Olympics, and agreed to play five games in five cities in Australia. The Australians won the first three games and the USA team won the last two.

She was one of six core players selected for the 2000 Summer Olympics in Sydney, but withdrew herself from consideration to avoid the extensive touring.

=== Coaching career ===
Azzi became the head coach of the women's basketball team at the University of San Francisco in 2010. On March 8, 2016, Azzi lead the Dons to a 70–68 upset over the BYU Cougars in the WCC tournament championship game to earn an automatic bid to the NCAA tournament, which was the Dons' first appearance since the 1996–97 season. On September 15, 2016, Azzi stepped down as head coach of the Dons.

== Business development ==
From 2005 to 2008, Azzi served on the Board of Directors of USA Basketball. Between 2010 and 2021, Azzi led Azzi Academy, a youth basketball program at Tamalpais High School.

Azzi served as an associate vice president of development at the University of San Francisco (USF) and academy global director at the National Basketball Association (NBA) between 2017 and 2021. In 2019, she became a Golden State Warriors analyst at NBC Sports and served for two years.

In 2021, Azzi was named the chief business development officer for Las Vegas Aces. The specifics of her departure from the Aces are not publicly specified and the Aces website no longer has her listed as an employee as of September 2025. Azzi's partner, Blair Hardiek, is still listed as an Aces employee.

== Awards and recognition ==
- 2× WNBA 3-point field goal percentage leader: (1999, 2001)
- WNBA free throw percentage leader: (2000)
- Named to the Kodak All-America First Team in 1989 and 1990.
- 1990 recipient of the Wade Trophy and Naismith Award.
- 1990—Winner of the Honda Sports Award for basketball
- NCAA Final Four Most Outstanding Player, and the West Region MVP in 1990.
- Pac-10 Player of the Year award in 1989 and 1990.
- Three time All-Pac 10 First Team selection
- Inducted into the Women's Basketball Hall of Fame in 2009
- One of the six recipients of the 2015 Silver Anniversary Awards

== Career playing statistics ==
=== College ===
Legend
| GP | Games played | GS | Games started | MPG | Minutes per game |
| FG% | Field goal percentage | 3P% | 3-point field goal percentage | FT% | Free throw percentage |
| RPG | Rebounds per game | APG | Assists per game | SPG | Steals per game |
| BPG | Blocks per game | PPG | Points per game | **Bold** | Career high |

| Year | Team | GP | Points | FG% | 3P% | FT% | RPG | APG | SPG | BPG | PPG |
|---|---|---|---|---|---|---|---|---|---|---|---|
| 1986–87 | Stanford | 27 | 247 | 45.3% | 0 | 68.4% | 3.7 | 6.1 | NA | NA | 9.1 |
| 1987–88 | Stanford | 32 | 405 | 43.3% | 43.2% | 79.2% | 3.9 | 6.0 | **3.0** | 0.0 | 12.7 |
| 1988–89 | Stanford | 31 | **513** | **54.4%** | **49.5%** | 78.7% | **4.2** | **6.5** | 2.2 | **0.3** | **16.5** |
| 1989–90 | Stanford | **32** | 469 | 49.7% | 44.2% | **79.8%** | 3.8 | 6.0 | 1.9 | 0.2 | 14.7 |
| Career | | 122 | 1634 | 48.5% | 45.2% | 76.6% | 3.9 | 6.2 | 1.8 | 0.1 | 13.4 |

=== WNBA ===
Legend
| GP | Games played | GS | Games started | MPG | Minutes per game | RPG | Rebounds per game |
| APG | Assists per game | SPG | Steals per game | BPG | Blocks per game | PPG | Points per game |
| TO | Turnovers per game | FG% | Field-goal percentage | 3P% | 3-point field-goal percentage | FT% | Free-throw percentage |
| **Bold** | Career best | ° | League leader |

| ‡ | WNBA record |

==== Regular season ====
| Year | Team | GP | GS | MPG | FG% | 3P% | FT% | RPG | APG | SPG | BPG | TO | PPG |
|---|---|---|---|---|---|---|---|---|---|---|---|---|---|
| 1999 | Detroit | 28 | 19 | 29.9 | **.514** | **.517**° | .827 | 2.2 | 3.8 | **0.9** | 0.1 | 2.0 | **10.8** |
| 2000 | Utah | 15 | 15 | 37.3 | .452 | .417 | **.930**° | 2.7 | **6.1** | 0.8 | 0.3 | 1.9 | 9.6 |
| 2001 | Utah | 32° | 32° | **37.7** | .408 | .514° | .917 | **3.1** | 5.3 | 0.7 | 0.3 | 2.2 | 8.6 |
| 2002 | Utah | 32° | 32° | 36.0 | .460 | .446 | .798 | 2.2 | 4.9 | 0.8 | **0.4** | 2.1 | 9.6 |
| 2003 | San Antonio | **34**° | **34**° | 33.4 | .403 | .402 | .785 | 2.7 | 3.3 | 0.8 | 0.3 | **1.8** | 7.6 |
| Career | 5 years, 3 teams | 141 | 132 | 34.7 | .445 | .458‡ | .845 | 2.6 | 4.5 | 0.8 | 0.3 | 2.0 | 9.1 |

==== Playoffs ====
| Year | Team | GP | GS | MPG | FG% | 3P% | FT% | RPG | APG | SPG | BPG | TO | PPG |
|---|---|---|---|---|---|---|---|---|---|---|---|---|---|
| 1999 | Detroit | 1 | 1 | **40.0** | .154 | .167 | – | **5.0** | 3.0 | 0.0 | **1.0** | 2.0 | 5.0 |
| 2001 | Utah | 2 | 2 | 37.5 | .250 | .286 | **1.000** | 1.5 | 5.0 | 0.5 | 0.5 | 2.5 | 4.5 |
| 2002 | Utah | **5** | **5** | 37.2 | **.394** | **.368** | .875 | 2.6 | **6.8** | **0.8** | **1.0** | **1.6** | **8.0** |
| Career | 3 years, 1 teams | 8 | 8 | 37.6 | .310 | .313 | .889 | 2.6 | 5.9 | 0.6 | 0.9 | 1.9 | 6.8 |

== Head coaching record ==
Record table
| Season | Team | Overall | Conference | Standing | Postseason |
|---|---|---|---|---|---|
San Francisco Dons (West Coast Conference) (2010–present)
| 2010–11 | San Francisco | 4–25 | 1–13 | 8th | |
| 2011–12 | San Francisco | 5–25 | 3–12 | 8th | |
| 2012–13 | San Francisco | 12–19 | 4–12 | 8th | |
| 2013–14 | San Francisco | 12–19 | 6–12 | T–7th | |
| 2014–15 | San Francisco | 19–14 | 8–10 | 6th | WNIT First Round |
| 2015–16 | San Francisco | 21–12 | 9–9 | 6th | NCAA first round |
| San Francisco: | | 73–114 (.390) | 31–68 (.313) | | |
| Total: | | 73–114 (.390) | | | |
National champion Postseason invitational champion Conference regular season champion Conference regular season and conference tournament champion Division regular season champion Division regular season and conference tournament champion Conference tournament champion

== Personal life ==
Azzi married Blair Hardiek Azzi in 2015. They have two children, a son, Macklin and a daughter, Camden.

2025 NCAA Champion and Tournament MOP Azzi Fudd takes her namesake from the elder Azzi's surname, according to her mother Katie Smrcka-Duffy Fudd. The younger Fudd went on to don Jennifer's No. 8 as her jersey number while winning the 2021 FIBA U19 FIBA World Cup. The two met in 2015, with Jennifer later stating "When I heard there was a child named after me, not my first name, but my last name, which is pretty unique... that's a huge honor."
