= 2000 Utah Starzz season =

- Head coach: Fred Williams
- Arena: Delta Center

Results
- Record: 18–14 (.563)
- Place: 5th (Western)
- Playoff finish: Did not qualify

The 2000 WNBA season was the 4th season for the Utah Starzz. The team finished the season with a winning record, but fell short for the WNBA Playoffs, falling two games back to the Phoenix Mercury.

== Transactions ==
=== Indiana Fever expansion draft ===
The following player was selected in the Indiana Fever expansion draft from the Utah Starzz:

Player	Nationality	School/Team/Country
Chantel Tremitiere	United States	Auburn

=== Miami Sol expansion draft ===
The following player was selected in the Miami Sol expansion draft from the Utah Starzz:

Player	Nationality	School/Team/Country
Debbie Black	United States	Saint Joseph's

=== WNBA draft ===
Round	Pick	Player	Nationality	School/Team/Country
1	12	Naomi Mulitauaopele	United States	Stanford
3	35	Stacy Frese	United States	Iowa State
4	51	Kristen Rasmussen	United States	Michigan State

=== Transactions ===
Date	Transaction
December 15, 1999	Lost Chantel Tremitiere to the Indiana Fever in the WNBA expansion draft
December 15, 1999	Lost Debbie Black to the Miami Sol in the WNBA expansion draft
April 24, 2000	Traded 2 2000 1st Round Picks to the Detroit Shock in exchange for Jennifer Azzi and a 2000 1st Round Pick
April 25, 2000	Drafted Naomi Mulitauaopele, Stacy Frese and Kristen Rasmussen in the 2000 WNBA draft
May 27, 2000	Waived Krystyna Lara
June 8, 2000	Waived Kristen Rasmussen
July 7, 2000	Waived Katryna Gaither
July 27, 2000	Signed Kym Hope

== Roster ==
2000 Utah Starzz roster
Players
Coaches

Pos.	No.	Nat.	Name	Height	Weight	DOB	From	Yrs
G	8	(United States)	Azzi, Jennifer	5' 8" (1.73m)	143 lb (65kg)	1968-08-31	Stanford	1
C	12	(Polish People's Republic)	Dydek, Margo	7' 2" (2.18m)	223 lb (101kg)	1974-04-28		2
G	4	(United States)	Frese, Stacy	5' 8" (1.73m)	126 lb (57kg)	1976-09-23	Iowa State	R
C	33	(United States)	Gaither, Katryna	6' 3" (1.91m)	170 lb (77kg)	1975-08-13	Notre Dame	R
F	15	(United States)	Goodson, Adrienne	6' 0" (1.83m)	165 lb (75kg)	1966-10-19	Old Dominion	1
C	54	(United States)	Herrig, Amy	6' 3" (1.91m)	193 lb (88kg)	1977-06-16	Iowa	R
G	7	(Socialist Federal Republic of Yugoslavia)	Hlede, Korie	5' 9" (1.75m)	155 lb (70kg)	1975-03-29	Duquesne	2
C	23	(United States)	Hope, Kym	6' 2" (1.88m)	165 lb (75kg)	1977-11-23	Miami (FL)	R
G	7	(Hungarian People's Republic)	Iványi, Dalma	5' 10" (1.78m)	135 lb (61kg)	1976-03-13	FIU	1
F	23	(United States)	Johnson, LaTonya	6' 1" (1.85m)	150 lb (68kg)	1975-08-17	Memphis	2
F	14	(United States)	Mulitauaopele, Naomi	6' 3" (1.91m)		1976-03-06	Stanford	R
F	52	(United States)	Rasmussen, Kristen	6' 4" (1.93m)	172 lb (78kg)	1978-11-01	Michigan State	R
G/F	30	(United States)	Starbird, Kate	6' 1" (1.85m)	153 lb (69kg)	1975-07-30	Stanford	1
C	24	(United States)	Williams, Natalie	6' 2" (1.88m)	210 lb (95kg)	1970-11-30	UCLA	1

Head coach
(United States) Fred Williams (Boise State)
Assistant coaches
(United States) Candi Harvey
(United States) Michael Layden

Legend

- (C) Team captain
- (DP) Unsigned draft pick
- (FA) Free agent
- (S) Suspended
- Injured

== Schedule ==
=== Regular season ===
2000 game log
Total: 18–14 (Home: 12–4; Road: 6–10)
May: 0–1 (Home: 0–0; Road: 0–1)

Game	Date	Team	Score	High points	High rebounds	High assists	Location Attendance	Record
1	May 31	@ Los Angeles	L 62-69	Natalie Williams (21)	Natalie Williams (14)	Dalma Iványi (3)	Great Western Forum	0–1

June: 8–7 (Home: 6–3; Road: 2–4)

Game	Date	Team	Score	High points	High rebounds	High assists	Location Attendance	Record
2	June 1	Minnesota	W 83-74	Natalie Williams (16)	Natalie Williams (14)	Frese; Iványi (3)	Delta Center	1–1
3	June 3	@ New York	L 76-87	Adrienne Goodson (21)	Adrienne Goodson (10)	Goodson; Iványi (4)	Madison Square Garden	1–2
4	June 7	Phoenix	W 76-61	Natalie Williams (12)	Natalie Williams (15)	Dalma Iványi (4)	Delta Center	2–2
5	June 8	@ Portland	W 81-72	Kate Starbird (17)	Natalie Williams (16)	Dalma Iványi (7)	Rose Garden	3–2
6	June 10	Houston	L 71-73	Natalie Williams (17)	Natalie Williams (9)	Margo Dydek (5)	Delta Center	3–3
7	June 12	@ Houston	L 85-107	Adrienne Goodson (24)	Margo Dydek (7)	Korie Hlede (4)	Compaq Center	3–4
8	June 13	Orlando	L 80-88	Natalie Williams (17)	Natalie Williams (14)	Dydek; Goodson (5)	Delta Center	3–5
9	June 15	Charlotte	W 96-68	Adrienne Goodson (27)	Natalie Williams (18)	Dalma Iványi (5)	Delta Center	4–5
10	June 17	Washington	W 70-67	Natalie Williams (30)	Natalie Williams (13)	Goodson; Iványi (4)	Delta Center	5–5
11	June 18	@ Seattle	W 56-53	Margo Dydek (16)	Margo Dydek (7)	Adrienne Goodson (3)	KeyArena	6–5
12	June 20	Seattle	W 66-63	Adrienne Goodson (23)	Margo Dydek (8)	Dalma Iványi (4)	Delta Center	7–5
13	June 22	@ Minnesota	L 64-86	Adrienne Goodson (13)	Goodson; Herrig (7)	Korie Hlede (4)	Target Center	7–6
14	June 23	Houston	L 66-83	Adrienne Goodson (18)	Natalie Williams (8)	Dydek; Hlede (3)	Delta Center	7–7
15	June 26	Sacramento	W 89-80	Natalie Williams (21)	Natalie Williams (14)	Dalma Iványi (6)	Delta Center	8–7
16	June 30	@ Sacramento	L 62-85	Natalie Williams (19)	Margo Dydek (9)	Iványi; Williams (4)	ARCO Arena	8–8

July: 7–4 (Home: 4–1; Road: 3–3)

Game	Date	Team	Score	High points	High rebounds	High assists	Location Attendance	Record
17	July 1	@ Seattle	W 81-60	Natalie Williams (18)	Dydek; Williams (5)	Dalma Iványi (7)	KeyArena	9–8
18	July 7	Detroit	L 69-73	Natalie Williams (22)	Natalie Williams (11)	Azzi; Hlede (5)	Delta Center	9–9
19	July 9	@ Los Angeles	L 72-92	Adrienne Goodson (13)	Natalie Williams (8)	Azzi; Goodson (4)	Great Western Forum	9–10
20	July 12	Portland	W 76-67	Natalie Williams (22)	Natalie Williams (14)	Jennifer Azzi (4)	Delta Center	10–10
21	July 14	Phoenix	W 87-84	Korie Hlede (20)	Adrienne Goodson (7)	Jennifer Azzi (8)	Delta Center	11–10
22	July 15	@ Sacramento	W 75-69	Natalie Williams (29)	Natalie Williams (13)	Jennifer Azzi (8)	ARCO Arena	12–10
23	July 19	@ Phoenix	L 76-86	Natalie Williams (20)	Natalie Williams (14)	Jennifer Azzi (7)	America West Arena	12–11
24	July 21	@ Miami	L 65-76	Natalie Williams (18)	Natalie Williams (10)	Jennifer Azzi (2)	American Airlines Arena	12–12
25	July 23	@ Orlando	W 69-66	Natalie Williams (23)	Natalie Williams (12)	Jennifer Azzi (8)	TD Waterhouse Centre	13–12
26	July 26	Cleveland	W 84-77	Adrienne Goodson (27)	Natalie Williams (19)	Korie Hlede (7)	Delta Center	14–12
27	July 29	Indiana	W 79-71	Adrienne Goodson (29)	Natalie Williams (15)	Jennifer Azzi (9)	Delta Center	15–12

August: 3–2 (Home: 2–0; Road: 1–2)

Game	Date	Team	Score	High points	High rebounds	High assists	Location Attendance	Record
28	August 2	@ Minnesota	W 72-62	Jennifer Azzi (20)	Natalie Williams (11)	Jennifer Azzi (7)	Target Center	16–12
29	August 3	@ Cleveland	L 71-74	Korie Hlede (18)	Margo Dydek (7)	Jennifer Azzi (5)	Gund Arena	16–13
30	August 5	@ Charlotte	L 82-84	Natalie Williams (23)	Goodson; Williams (9)	Jennifer Azzi (9)	Charlotte Coliseum	16–14
31	August 7	Portland	W 83-73	Natalie Williams (25)	Natalie Williams (11)	Jennifer Azzi (7)	Delta Center	17–14
32	August 9	Los Angeles	W 89-77	Natalie Williams (26)	Natalie Williams (13)	Adrienne Goodson (6)	Delta Center	18–14

=== Season standings ===
Western Conference	W	L	PCT	Conf.	GB
Los Angeles Sparks ^{x}	28	4	.875	17–4	–
Houston Comets ^{x}	27	5	.844	17–4	1.0
Sacramento Monarchs ^{x}	21	11	.656	13–8	7.0
Phoenix Mercury ^{x}	20	12	.625	11–10	8.0
Utah Starzz ^{o}	18	14	.563	13–8	10.0
Minnesota Lynx ^{o}	15	17	.469	5–16	13.0
Portland Fire ^{o}	10	22	.313	4–17	18.0
Seattle Storm ^{o}	6	26	.188	4–17	22.0

== Statistics ==
Legend
GP	Games played	GS	Games started	MPG	Minutes per game	RPG	Rebounds per game
APG	Assists per game	SPG	Steals per game	BPG	Blocks per game	PPG	Points per game
FG%	Field-goal percentage	3P%	3-point field-goal percentage	FT%	Free-throw percentage	TO	Turnovers per game
PF	Fouls per game		Team leader		League leader

=== Regular season ===
Player	GP	GS	MPG	FG%	3P%	FT%	RPG	APG	SPG	BPG	PPG
Jennifer Azzi	15	15	37.3	.452	.417	.930	2.7	6.1	0.8	0.3	9.6
Natalie Williams	29	29	35.8	.490	.600	.798	11.6	1.8	1.2	0.6	18.7
Adrienne Goodson	29	28	32.0	.480	.276	.687	5.7	2.4	1.4	0.2	17.2
Korie Hlede	31	31	28.0	.454	.431	.729	3.0	3.0	1.2	0.1	10.1
Margo Dydek	32	32	24.2	.445	.143	.796	5.5	1.6	0.6	3.0	9.2
Dalma Iványi	27	16	18.1	.313	.279	.750	2.0	2.3	0.9	0.1	3.4
LaTonya Johnson	29	6	16.6	.403	.333	.651	1.8	0.9	0.4	0.1	5.0
Amy Herrig	25	0	13.6	.480	.000	.613	2.4	0.8	0.3	0.2	3.6
Naomi Mulitauaopele	22	3	13.2	.594	.667	.750	1.5	0.3	0.2	0.3	4.5
Kate Starbird	29	0	11.7	.358	.217	.810	1.1	1.0	0.4	0.4	4.0
Stacy Frese	21	0	10.6	.333	.346	.917	0.9	0.8	0.2	0.0	3.0
Kristen Rasmussen	1	0	9.0	N/A	N/A	N/A	2.0	1.0	1.0	0.0	0.0
Katryna Gaither	9	0	6.0	.286	N/A	1.000	1.9	0.4	0.4	0.0	1.6
Kym Hope	3	1	1.3	.000	N/A	1.000	0.7	0.0	0.0	0.0	0.7

^{‡}Waived/Released during the season
^{†}Traded during the season
^{≠}Acquired during the season
