= 2003 San Antonio Silver Stars season =

- Head coach: Candi Harvey; Shell Dailey (interim)
- Arena: SBC Center

Results
- Record: 12–22 (.353)
- Place: 6th (Western)
- Playoff finish: Did not qualify

The 2003 WNBA season was the 1st season for the franchise in San Antonio and the 7th season in the league as a franchise.

== Offseason ==
=== Dispersal Draft ===
Pick	Player	Nationality	WNBA Team	Previous WNBA Team
12	LaQuanda Barksdale (G/F)	United States	San Antonio Silver Stars	Portland Fire

=== WNBA draft ===
Pick	Player	Nationality	School/Club team
11	Coretta Brown (G)	United States	North Carolina
25	Ke-Ke Tardy (F)	United States	LSU
40	Brooke Armistead (G)	United States	Austin Peay

== Regular season ==
=== Season schedule ===
Date	Opponent	Score	Result	Record
May 24	Seattle	65-56	Win	1-0
May 28	@ Phoenix	50-51	Loss	1-1
May 30	Minnesota	65-75	Loss	1-2
June 1	Connecticut	64-83	Loss	1-3
June 4	@ Charlotte	52-67	Loss	1-4
June 5	Phoenix	70-55	Win	2-4
June 7	Detroit	55-74	Loss	2-5
June 10	@ Washington	72-79	Loss	2-6
June 14	Charlotte	62-52	Win	3-6
June 20	Houston	76-69	Win	4-6
June 22	@ Seattle	53-93	Loss	4-7
June 24	@ Sacramento	60-57	Win	5-7
June 26	Los Angeles	58-67	Loss	5-8
June 28	@ Houston	49-64	Loss	5-9
July 1	@ Detroit	88-99	Loss	5-10
July 5	Phoenix	81-70	Win	6-10
July 10	@ Sacramento	76-89	Loss	6-11
July 16	@ Minnesota	78-85	Loss	6-12
July 17	Sacramento	60-62	Loss	6-13
July 19	Washington	77-85	Loss	6-14
July 23	@ Indiana	47-81	Loss	6-15
July 25	@ Minnesota	54-81	Loss	6-16
July 27	Cleveland	64-55	Win	7-16
July 30	@ Los Angeles	70-62	Win	8-16
August 1	Houston	63-53	Win	9-16
August 2	@ Houston	55-64	Loss	9-17
August 5	@ New York	60-69	Loss	9-18
August 7	Sacramento	61-86	Loss	9-19
August 9	Los Angeles	69-52	Win	10-19
August 12	@ Seattle	87-77	Win	11-19
August 16	Minnesota	64-73	Loss	11-20
August 20	Seattle	78-70 (OT)	Win	12-20
August 22	@ Phoenix	62-89	Loss	12-21
August 23	@ Los Angeles	70-83	Loss	12-22

== Season standings ==
Western Conference	W	L	PCT	GB	Home	Road	Conf.
Los Angeles Sparks ^{x}	24	10	.706	–	11–6	13–4	17–7
Houston Comets ^{x}	20	14	.588	4.0	14–3	6–11	14–10
Sacramento Monarchs ^{x}	19	15	.559	5.0	12–5	7–10	13–11
Minnesota Lynx ^{x}	18	16	.529	6.0	11–6	7–10	14–10
Seattle Storm ^{o}	18	16	.529	6.0	13–4	5–12	11–13
San Antonio Silver Stars ^{o}	12	22	.353	12.0	9–8	3–14	10–14
Phoenix Mercury ^{o}	8	26	.235	16.0	6–11	2–15	5–19

== Player stats ==
Note: GP= Games played; REB= Rebounds; AST= Assists; STL = Steals; BLK = Blocks; PTS = Points; AVG = Average

Player	GP	REB	AST	STL	BLK	PTS	AVG
Marie Ferdinand-Harris	34	127	90	58	6	470	13.8
Margo Dydek	34	251	58	19	100	406	11.9
Adrienne Goodson	33	185	71	24	6	371	11.2
Gwen Jackson	33	205	20	15	17	289	8.8
Jennifer Azzi	34	91	111	27	9	260	7.6
Sylvia Crawley	33	105	19	18	19	115	3.5
Semeka Randall	33	53	23	11	0	88	2.7
LaQuanda Barksdale	26	33	5	1	3	59	2.3
Tausha Mills	29	55	7	4	2	58	2.0
LaTonya Johnson	31	25	9	3	1	58	1.9
Tai Dillard	24	15	15	7	4	41	1.7
