= Margo Dydek =

Polish basketball player (1974–2011)

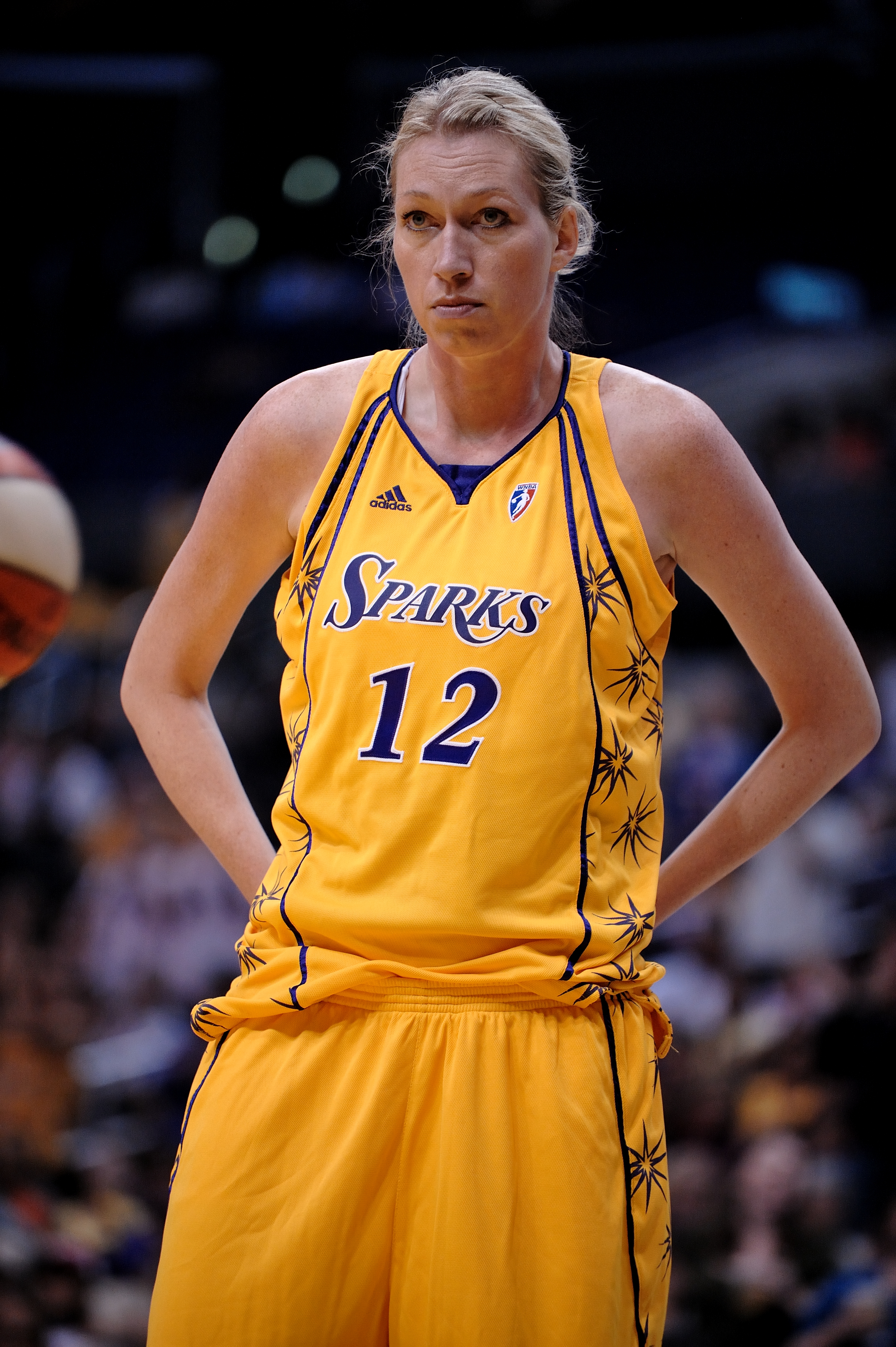
- Dydek with the Los Angeles Sparks in 2008

Personal information
- Born: 28 April 1974 Warsaw, Poland
- Died: 27 May 2011 (aged 37) Brisbane, Australia
- Listed height: 7 ft 2 in (2.18 m)
- Listed weight: 223 lb (101 kg)

Career information
- WNBA draft: 1998: 1st round, 1st overall pick
- Drafted by: Utah Starzz
- Playing career: 1998–2008
- Position: Center
- Number: 12

Career history
- 1992–1994: Olimpia Poznań
- 1994–1996: Valenciennes Orchies
- 1996–1998: Pool Getafe
- 1998–2004: Utah Starzz / San Antonio Silver Stars
- 1998–2004: Arka Gdynia
- 2005–2007: Connecticut Sun
- 2006–2007: ROS Casares Valencia
- 2008: Los Angeles Sparks

Career highlights
- 9× BLK champion (1993, 1994, 1998–2004); 2× BLK MVP (2002, 2005); BLK Finals MVP (2000); 4× Liga Femenina champion (1997, 1998, 2007, 2008); 2× Spanish Supercopa winner (2006, 2007); 2× WNBA All-Star (2003, 2006); 8× WNBA blocks leader (1998–2003, 2006, 2007); No. 12 retired by Connecticut Sun; 2× EuroLeague rebounding leader (2002, 2005); La Gazzetta dello Sport's European Female Basketball Player of the Year (1999); Poland's Sports Woman of the Year; Polish Cross of Merit (1999)
- Stats at WNBA.com
- Stats at Basketball Reference
- FIBA Hall of Fame
Medals
Women's Basketball
Representing Poland
EuroBasket Women
Gold medal – first place	1999 Poland

Małgorzata Teresa Dydek-Twigg (28 April 1974 – 27 May 2011), better known as Margo Dydek, was a Polish professional basketball player. Standing 7 ft 2 in (2.18 m) tall, she was the tallest professional female basketball player in the world. Playing center position, she won nine national championships in Poland and four in Spain during her career. Outside of Europe, she played 11 seasons in the WNBA, for three teams, and was a coach for the Northside Wizards in the Queensland Basketball League. She was awarded the Polish Gold Cross of Merit (1999).

She was inducted into the FIBA Hall of Fame in 2019.

== Early life ==
Dydek was born 28 April 1974 in Warsaw, Poland, to a 6-foot-7-inch (2.01 m) father and a 6-foot-3-inch (1.91 m) mother. She had two sisters; her elder sister, Katarzyna (6 ft 7 in [2.01 m]) had played for the Colorado Xplosion of the now-defunct ABL. Her younger sister, Marta (6 ft 6 in [1.98 m]), graduated from the University of Texas–El Paso where she played basketball, and played professionally in Spain in the 2000s.

== Professional career ==
=== Europe ===
Dydek played for Olimpia Poznań from 1992 to 1994, before playing for Valenciennes Orchies in France from 1994 to 1996, where she met her future husband, David. She then moved to Spain and played for Pool Getafe from 1996 to 1998, and moved back to Poland to play for Fota Porta Gdynia starting with the 1998–99 season. She continued to play with the club through several sponsorship changes; since then, the club has taken the names Polpharma and Lotos.

In 1999–2000 she averaged 18.5 points and 10.7 rebounds for Gdynia in FIBA EuroLeague play. She was named Most Valuable Player of the Polish League Finals of the 1999–2000 season. In 1999, she was also named the best female basketball player in Europe by the Italian sports magazine La Gazzetta dello Sport. Dydek was chosen as Poland's Sports Woman of the Year and was a member of the Poland women's national basketball team until 2007, winning the EuroBasket Women 1999. She helped lead Gdynia to runner-up finishes in the FIBA EuroLeague in 2002 and 2004.

=== WNBA ===
Dydek made her first trip to the United States in May 1998 for WNBA pre-draft camp. Dydek was drafted 1st overall in the 1998 WNBA draft by the Utah Starzz (the franchise was subsequently transferred to San Antonio).

On 16 April 2005, during the 2005 WNBA draft, the San Antonio Silver Stars traded Dydek to the Connecticut Sun in exchange for the Sun's first-round draft pick, Katie Feenstra from Liberty University.

Records held:

- All-time leader in blocks (877), in 323 games
- Leader in season total blocks nine times (1998–2003, 2005–07)
- Leader in season blocks per game eight times (1998–2003, 2006, 2007)
- Most defensive rebounds (214) in 2001

On 3 June 2008, Dydek signed with the Los Angeles Sparks, following time away from basketball due to her pregnancy. She had given birth to her son, David, in April that year.

== Career statistics ==
=== WNBA ===
Legend
GP	Games played	GS	Games started	MPG	Minutes per game	RPG	Rebounds per game
APG	Assists per game	SPG	Steals per game	BPG	Blocks per game	PPG	Points per game
TO	Turnovers per game	FG%	Field-goal percentage	3P%	3-point field-goal percentage	FT%	Free-throw percentage
**Bold**	Career best	°	League leader

==== Regular season ====
Year	Team	GP	GS	MPG	FG%	3P%	FT%	RPG	APG	SPG	BPG	TO	PPG
1998	Utah	30°	30°	28.0	.482	.143	.732	7.8	1.8	0.5	**3.8**°	3.6	12.9
1999	Utah	32°	28	22.9	.498	.350	**.857**	6.4	1.8	0.4	2.4°	2.8	12.6
2000	Utah	32°	32°	24.2	.445	.143	.796	5.5	1.6	0.6	3.0°	2.6	9.2
2001	Utah	32°	32°	**30.3**	.440	.400	.798	7.6	2.0	**0.8**	3.5°	2.8	10.9
2002	Utah	30	27	29.2	.436	.250	.844	**8.7**	**2.4**	**0.8**	3.6°	3.2	**13.1**
2003	San Antonio	**34**°	**34**°	27.2	.451	.000	.723	7.4	1.7	0.6	2.9°	2.4	11.9
2004	San Antonio	**34**°	24	20.1	.433	**.500**	.759	4.9	1.8	0.6	1.4	1.9	6.6
2005	Connecticut	31	30	21.6	**.537**	**.500**	.769	6.3	1.2	0.3	2.3	1.5	7.3
2006	Connecticut	**34**°	**34**°	21.9	.494	.250	.821	6.1	1.2	0.6	2.5°	1.5	9.4
2007	Connecticut	32	30	20.1	.487	.400	.789	6.5	1.0	0.4	2.1°	1.6	6.7
2008	Los Angeles	2	0	7.0	.400	–	–	1.5	0.0	0.0	0.0	**0.0**	2.0
Career	11 years, 3 teams	323	301	24.4	.467	.295	.791	6.6	1.6	0.5	2.7	2.3	10.0

==== Playoffs ====
Year	Team	GP	GS	MPG	FG%	3P%	FT%	RPG	APG	SPG	BPG	TO	PPG
2001	Utah	2	2	**34.5**	.429	–	.769	7.0	1.5	0.5	**3.5**	2.0	**14.0**
2002	Utah	5	5	34.2	.400	.600	**.867**	**8.8**	**2.4**	0.2	3.4	3.2	12.0
2005	Connecticut	**8**	**8**	18.3	.376	**1.000**	.636	5.3	0.5	0.4	1.6	2.0	4.5
2006	Connecticut	5	5	26.6	**.458**	.000	.846	7.2	0.8	**0.8**	2.8	1.6	11.0
2007	Connecticut	3	3	26.7	.400	.500	.000	6.3	0.7	0.0	2.7	1.0	7.0
2008	Los Angeles	1	0	1.0	–	–	–	1.0	0.0	0.0	0.0	**0.0**	0.0
Career	6 years, 3 teams	24	23	25.0	.412	.556	.759	6.5	1.0	0.4	2.5	2.0	8.3

== Personal life ==
Dydek was married and had two sons. Dydek spoke five languages and her teammates referred to her as "Large Marge".

== Death ==
On 19 May 2011, Dydek, at the time pregnant with her third child, collapsed at her home in Brisbane due to cardiac arrest. She was taken by ambulance to a hospital and placed in a medically induced coma. She had been working as a coach for the Northside Wizards in the Queensland Basketball League. She never regained consciousness and died eight days later on 27 May 2011.

== See also ==
- List of WNBA career blocks leaders
