= Dee Brown (basketball, born 1968) =

American basketball player (born 1968)

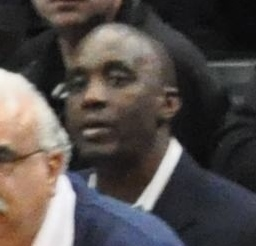
- Brown in 2012

Personal information
- Born: November 29, 1968 (age 57) Jacksonville, Florida, U.S.
- Listed height: 6 ft 0 in (1.83 m)
- Listed weight: 160 lb (73 kg)

Career information
- High school: Bolles School (Jacksonville, Florida)
- College: Jacksonville (1986–1990)
- NBA draft: 1990: 1st round, 19th overall pick
- Drafted by: Boston Celtics
- Playing career: 1990–2002
- Position: Point guard / shooting guard
- Number: 7
- Coaching career: 2002–present

Career history

Playing
- 1990–1998: Boston Celtics
- 1998–2000: Toronto Raptors
- 2000–2002: Orlando Magic

Coaching
- 2002: Orlando Miracle
- 2004: San Antonio Silver Stars
- 2009–2011: Springfield Armor
- 2011–2013: Detroit Pistons (assistant)
- 2013–2015: Sacramento Kings (assistant)

Career highlights
- NBA All-Rookie First Team (1991); NBA Slam Dunk Contest champion (1991); First-team All-Sun Belt (1990); Second-team All-Sun Belt (1989); No. 4 retired by Jacksonville Dolphins

Career NBA statistics
- Points: 6,758 (11.1 ppg)
- Assists: 2,227 (3.7 apg)
- Rebounds: 1,569 (2.6 rpg)
- Stats at NBA.com
- Stats at Basketball Reference

DeCovan Kadell "Dee" Brown (born November 29, 1968) is an American former professional basketball player who spent thirty years in the NBA, including twelve seasons as a player (1990–2002) in the National Basketball Association (NBA), playing for the Boston Celtics, Toronto Raptors, and Orlando Magic, and as an executive with the Orlando Magic, Detroit Pistons, Sacramento Kings, and as Vice President of Holistic Player Performance with the Los Angeles Clippers. His daughter Lexie Brown most recently played for the Seattle Storm of the Women's National Basketball Association (WNBA).

== Playing career ==
A 6-foot-0-inch (1.83 m) guard from Jacksonville University, Brown was selected by the Celtics with the 19th pick of the 1990 NBA draft. He was a member of the NBA All-Rookie Team in his first year, when he played in all 82 games and averaged 8.7 points per game. One of the highlights of his career occurred in 1991, when he won the NBA Slam Dunk Contest with a no look slam dunk. He was a starter for Boston during the 1993–94 and 1994–95 seasons and posted his best scoring numbers, averaging more than 15 points per game each of those years. After seven and a half seasons with the Celtics, he was traded to the Raptors along with Chauncey Billups in 1998. Overall, during his career, he scored 6,758 total points.

== Television career ==
In 2005, Brown won a one-year contract as a studio analyst for ESPN as the winner of the reality show Dream Job, defeating five other former NBA players. He went on to host an ESPN show called City Slam.

== Coaching career ==
In 2005, Brown established EDGE Basketball, LLC with himself as CEO. The outfit specializes in training players from middle school up to the professional ranks.

Brown has coached in the Women's National Basketball Association, first as a head coach for the Orlando Miracle and then as the head coach for the San Antonio Silver Stars.

On July 29, 2009, Brown was named as the head coach of the Springfield Armor, a team in the NBA Development League. He also became the team's Director of Basketball Operations. In two seasons as coach of the Armor, the team finished with records of 7–43 (.140) and 13–37 (.260), for a total of 20–80 (.200).

In September 2011, Brown announced that he would be joining the Detroit Pistons as an assistant under Lawrence Frank.

On July 9, 2013, Brown joined the Sacramento Kings as an assistant coach and director of player development.

He joined the Los Angeles Clippers for the 2016–17 season and is now the general manager of their NBA G League team.

As of January 2022, Brown is the Director of university and Athletics Relations at his alma mater, Jacksonville University.

In 2026, it was announced that Brown will serve as a Player Enhancement Specialist for Athletes Unlimited Pro Basketball during the league's fifth championship season in Nashville.

== Head coaching record ==
Team	Year	G	W	L	W–L%	Finish	PG	PW	PL	PW–L%	Result
Orlando	2002	32	16	16	.500	5th in Eastern	—	—	—	—	Missed playoffs
San Antonio	2004	26	6	20	.231	(fired)	—	—	—	—	—
Career		58	22	36	.379		—	—	—	—	
