= 2007 San Antonio Silver Stars season =

- Head coach: Dan Hughes
- Arena: AT&T Center

Results
- Record: 20–14 (.588)
- Place: 2nd (Western)
- Playoff finish: Lost Conference Finals (2-0) to Phoenix Mercury

The 2007 WNBA season was the 11th season for the franchise and their 5th season in San Antonio. The team went to the playoffs for the first time in five years, losing in the conference finals to eventual champion Phoenix Mercury.

== Offseason ==
=== Dispersal Draft ===
Pick	Player	Nationality	Former team
4	Helen Darling	United States	Charlotte Sting

=== WNBA draft ===
Round	Pick	Player	Nationality	College/School/Team
2	17	Camille Little	United States	North Carolina
3	30	Nare Diawara	Mali	Virginia Tech

- Jessica Davenport was selected by San Antonio, but due to trade rights, she was later traded to the New York Liberty.

== Regular season ==
=== Season standings ===
Western Conference	W	L	PCT	GB	Home	Road	Conf.
Phoenix Mercury ^{x}	23	11	.676	–	12–5	11–6	17–5
San Antonio Silver Stars ^{x}	20	14	.588	3.0	9–8	11–6	13–9
Sacramento Monarchs ^{x}	19	15	.559	4.0	12–5	7–10	12–10
Seattle Storm ^{x}	17	17	.500	6.0	12–5	5–12	11–11
Houston Comets ^{o}	13	21	.382	10.0	7–10	6–11	10–12
Minnesota Lynx ^{o}	10	24	.294	13.0	7–10	3–14	8–14
Los Angeles Sparks ^{o}	10	24	.294	13.0	5–12	5–12	6–16

=== Season schedule ===
Date	Opponent	Score	Result	Record
May 19	@ Phoenix	72-81	Loss	0-1
May 23	Connecticut	74-71	Win	1-1
May 25	Seattle	82-71	Win	2-1
May 29	@ Houston	82-71	Win	3-1
May 31	Phoenix	85-97	Loss	3-2
June 2	@ Seattle	78-68	Win	4-2
June 5	@ Sacramento	57-74	Loss	4-3
June 9	Chicago	60-70	Loss	4-4
June 16	New York	79-71	Win	5-4
June 20	Minnesota	80-73	Win	6-4
June 22	@ New York	70-63	Win	7-4
June 23	@ Connecticut	71-58	Win	8-4
June 26	@ Houston	67-75	Loss	8-5
June 29	Minnesota	66-77	Loss	8-6
July 1	@ Detroit	71-68	Win	9-6
July 3	@ Washington	84-79	Win	10-6
July 7	Seattle	80-73	Win	11-6
July 11	@ Phoenix	87-77	Win	12-6
July 17	@ Los Angeles	63-61	Win	13-6
July 20	Sacramento	81-71	Win	14-6
July 22	@ Chicago	82-84 (OT)	Loss	14-7
July 24	@ Indiana	71-63 (OT)	Win	15-7
July 27	Houston	63-69	Loss	15-8
July 29	@ Seattle	92-88	Win	16-8
July 31	Detroit	79-84	Loss	16-9
August 2	Phoenix	79-84	Loss	16-10
August 4	Los Angeles	86-67	Win	17-10
August 7	Washington	73-77	Loss	17-11
August 9	Sacramento	72-61	Win	18-11
August 11	Houston	63-60	Win	19-11
August 14	@ Los Angeles	84-77 (OT)	Win	20-11
August 15	@ Sacramento	74-81	Loss	20-12
August 17	Indiana	55-59	Loss	20-13
August 19	@ Minnesota	55-81	Loss	20-14
August 23; 1st Round, G1	@ Sacramento	65-86	Loss	0-1
August 25; 1st Round, G2	Sacramento	86-61	Win	1-1
August 27; 1st Round, G3	Sacramento	80-78	Win	2-1
August 30; West Finals, G1	Phoenix	100-102	Loss	2-2
September 1 West Finals, G2	@ Phoenix	92-98	Loss	2-3

== Player stats ==
Player	GP	REB	AST	STL	BLK	PTS
Sophia Young	33	193	51	49	12	553
Becky Hammon	28	77	140	23	5	527
Shanna Crossley	34	46	27	14	2	314
Vickie Johnson	30	144	104	34	8	243
Erin Perperoglou	18	109	40	35	13	203
Ruth Riley	30	148	37	27	59	176
Marie Ferdinand-Harris	34	81	28	19	3	164
Helen Darling	33	69	103	45	1	134
Camille Little	34	152	23	30	11	132
Chantelle Anderson	11	20	3	1	5	28
Sandora Irvin	23	40	7	3	10	27
Kendra Wecker	14	8	4	3	1	16
