= 2005 San Antonio Silver Stars season =

- Head coach: Dan Hughes
- Arena: SBC Center

Results
- Record: 7–27 (.206)
- Place: 7th (Western)
- Playoff finish: Did not qualify

The 2005 WNBA season was the 9th season for the San Antonio Silver Stars franchise. It is the 3rd season in San Antonio. The season saw the franchise finish last in the Western Conference.

== Offseason ==
=== WNBA draft ===
Round	Pick	Player	Nationality	College/School/Team
1	4	Kendra Wecker (F)	United States	Kansas State
2	14	Shyra Ely (F)	United States	Tennessee
3	27	Catherine Kraayeveld (F)	United States	Oregon

- Margo Dydek was traded to the Connecticut Sun for Katie Feenstra during the draft.

== Regular season ==
=== Season standings ===
Western Conference	W	L	PCT	GB	Home	Road	Conf.
Sacramento Monarchs ^{x}	25	9	.735	–	15–2	10–7	17–5
Seattle Storm ^{x}	20	14	.588	5.0	14–3	6–11	13–9
Houston Comets ^{x}	19	15	.559	6.0	11–6	8–9	11–11
Los Angeles Sparks ^{x}	17	17	.500	8.0	11–6	6–11	12–10
Phoenix Mercury ^{o}	16	18	.471	9.0	11–6	5–12	12–10
Minnesota Lynx ^{o}	14	20	.412	11.0	11–6	3–14	9–13
San Antonio Silver Stars ^{o}	7	27	.206	18.0	5–12	2–15	3–19

=== Season schedule ===
Date	Opponent	Score	Result	Record
May 21	Houston	70-78	Loss	0-1
May 24	@ Detroit	65-74	Loss	0-2
May 27	Sacramento	67-71	Loss	0-3
May 29	@ Seattle	51-79	Loss	0-4
May 31	@ Los Angeles	70-81	Loss	0-5
June 2	Charlotte	69-62	Win	1-5
June 4	@ Connecticut	69-80	Loss	1-6
June 7	Washington	71-62	Win	2-6
June 11	Connecticut	69-78	Loss	2-7
June 15	@ Phoenix	62-76	Loss	2-8
June 18	Houston	69-75	Loss	2-9
June 21	@ New York	59-77	Loss	2-10
June 23	@ Charlotte	64-49	Win	3-10
June 25	@ Houston	44-62	Loss	3-11
June 28	@ Minnesota	53-63	Loss	3-12
June 30	Seattle	81-69	Win	4-12
July 2	New York	69-57	Win	5-12
July 5	Phoenix	69-76	Loss	5-13
July 14	@ Sacramento	61-72	Loss	5-14
July 15	@ Seattle	70-92	Loss	5-15
July 21	@ Indiana	53-66	Loss	5-16
July 23	Phoenix	49-66	Loss	5-17
July 26	Minnesota	78-71	Win	6-17
July 28	@ Washington	58-73	Loss	6-18
July 30	@ Houston	68-63	Win	7-18
August 2	Sacramento	57-67	Loss	7-19
August 5	Los Angeles	63-66	Loss	7-20
August 9	@ Minnesota	72-76	Loss	7-21
August 11	Indiana	50-57	Loss	7-22
August 13	Detroit	59-60	Loss	7-23
August 18	@ Sacramento	57-64	Loss	7-24
August 19	@ Phoenix	57-91	Loss	7-25
August 23	Seattle	51-78	Loss	7-26
August 26	Los Angeles	67-70	Loss	7-27

== Player stats ==
Player	Minutes	Field goals	Rebounds	Assists	Steals	Blocks	Points
Marie Ferdinand	999	132	116	68	46	5	388
Wendy Palmer-Daniel	882	125	193	33	20	7	326
Shannon Johnson	1104	88	91	158	46	5	317
Katie Feenstra	673	104	175	6	9	44	298
Chantelle Anderson	669	83	90	11	8	15	203
LaToya Thomas	505	69	68	22	7	8	185
Shyra Ely	528	50	62	27	7	4	139
Bernadette Ngoyisa	251	46	61	5	5	2	111
Dalma Ivanyi	577	25	50	68	26	0	75
Edna Campbell	248	21	14	14	7	0	48
Nikki McCray	302	15	20	16	11	0	38
Tai Dillard	51	4	6	3	2	0	9
Kendra Wecker	11	2	0	2	1	0	4
