= San Antonio Stars =

Former women's basketball team

- Conference: Western
- Leagues: WNBA
- Founded: 1997
- History: Utah Starzz (1997–2002); San Antonio Silver Stars (2003–2013); San Antonio Stars (2014–2017); Las Vegas Aces (2018–present)
- Arena: AT&T Center
- Location: San Antonio, Texas
- Team colors: Silver, black
- Ownership: Spurs Sports & Entertainment
- Championships: 0
- Conference titles: 1 (2008)
- Retired numbers: 1 (25)
Home	Away

The San Antonio Stars were a professional basketball team based in San Antonio, playing in the Western Conference in the Women's National Basketball Association (WNBA). The team was founded in Salt Lake City, Utah, as the Utah Starzz before the league's inaugural 1997 season began; then moved to San Antonio before the 2003 season and became the San Antonio Silver Stars, then simply the San Antonio Stars in 2014. The team was owned by Spurs Sports & Entertainment, which also owned the San Antonio Spurs of the NBA. The team was sold to MGM Resorts International in 2017 and moved to Paradise, Nevada to become the Las Vegas Aces for the 2018 season.

The Stars qualified for the WNBA Playoffs in seven of their fourteen years in San Antonio. The franchise was home to many high-quality players such as all-star point guard Becky Hammon, solid power-forward Sophia Young, former first-overall draft pick Ann Wauters, and seven-foot-two-inch center Margo Dydek. In 2008, the Silver Stars went to the WNBA Finals but were swept by the Detroit Shock.

The Stars played their games at AT&T Center, now Frost Bank Center.

== History ==
=== The Utah Starzz years (1997–2002) ===
One of the eight original WNBA teams, the Utah Starzz (partially named after the old ABA team, the Utah Stars, but with the zz at the end like the Utah Jazz) never met the same success as their (former) counterpart in the NBA, the Utah Jazz. They held the distinction of having the worst record in the WNBA in 1997 and were the first team to select in the 1998 WNBA draft. With their selection, they picked 7 ft. 2 in. center Margo Dydek, who easily became the tallest player in WNBA history. The pickup of Dydek did little to help their cause and they again finished near the bottom of the league in the 1998 & 1999 seasons. The Starzz finally posted a winning record in 2000, but did not make the playoffs. In 2001, the Utah Starzz made it to the playoffs for the first time, but they were quickly swept in the first round by the Sacramento Monarchs. In 2002, the Starzz made it to the playoffs again, and this time beat the Houston Comets in the Western Conference Semifinals 2 games to 1. Their playoff run ended in the Western Finals, however, as they were swept aside by the eventual champs, the Los Angeles Sparks.

=== Relocation to San Antonio ===
When the NBA divested itself of all of its WNBA franchises at the end of the 2002 season, the Utah Jazz ownership did not wish to retain ownership of the Starzz. The Starzz then looked for local Utah potential buyers, but none were found, leaving the franchise with the choices of either being sold to out-of-town investor(s) or folding.

The Starzz avoided being folded when the franchise was sold to Peter Holt (the owner of the NBA's San Antonio Spurs) and relocated to San Antonio, Texas. The team's name was changed to the San Antonio Silver Stars and would change its team colors to the silver and black motif used by the Spurs.

=== The Stars fall short (2003–2006) ===
Immediately after moving, the new Silver Stars made major roster moves, as they traded star Natalie Williams along with Coretta Brown to the Indiana Fever in exchange for Sylvia Crawley and Gwen Jackson. After losing seasons in 2003 and 2004, the team then traded away star Margo Dydek.

For the first four seasons (2003–2006) after moving to San Antonio, the franchise was unable to change its old losing trend and did not make the playoffs, in sharp contrast to their current NBA counterpart, the San Antonio Spurs. From 1997 to 2002, the Utah Starzz had a record of 87–99. From 2003 to 2006, the San Antonio Silver Stars record was 41–88.

=== Picking things up (2007–2008) ===
The 2007 season brought a lot of change for the Silver Stars. They acquired stars Becky Hammon, Ruth Riley, and Sandora Irvin in trades, selected Helen Darling in Charlotte Sting's dispersal draft, drafted Camille Little in the second round, signed Erin Buescher during the off-season, and retained key players, such as Marie Ferdinand-Harris, Vickie Johnson, Shanna Crossley, Kendra Wecker, and Sophia Young. The new-look Silver Stars became an instant contender in the Western Conference. On August 4, 2007 the Silver Stars clinched their first playoff berth since the franchise relocated to San Antonio in 2003. In the first round, the Silver Stars were matched up against the Sacramento Monarchs. After losing game 1 in Sacramento, the Silver Stars would win games 2 and 3 to advance to the Western Finals. The Silver Stars faced off against a strong Phoenix Mercury team, which had the number 1 seed in the Western Conference. The Silver Stars would lose Game 1 at home 102–100 on a controversial call by ref Lisa Mattingly. Mattingly called a foul on Shanna Crossley with 2.1 seconds left in the game and the score tied at 100. Replay showed that Crossley made no contact with Phoenix's Cappie Pondexter. However, Pondexter was sent to the line and made both free throws and Crossley's half-court shot to win the game nearly went in. On September 1, 2007 the Silver Stars' season came to an end after the Stars lost Game 2 98–92 in Phoenix.

Heading into 2008, the Silver Stars were regarded as a premiere contender and did not disappoint. After an average start, the Stars seized control of the Western Conference and rode to the best record in the West, and the #1 seed in the playoffs. In the first round, the Silver Stars once again faced off against the Sacramento Monarchs. Unlike 2007, the Stars won Game 1 on the road, 85–78. But the Monarchs would prove pesky, spoiling a potential clinch in Game 2 crushing the Silver Stars at home 84–67. Now the Silver Stars had to win game 3 or face an offseason of disappointment. In the Game, the Silver Stars would secure a 14-point lead and it seemed over. But a late rally by the Monarchs, including the last seven points in regulation, sent the game into overtime. In overtime, the Silver Stars clamped down and proved they were the better team, defeating the Monarchs 86–81, advancing to the Western Conference Finals for the second season in a row. In the West Finals, the Stars faced the resurgent Los Angeles Sparks team. In Game 1 in LA, the Stars took an early lead, but an 11–0 run by the Sparks into the half changed the tempo of the game and the Sparks took Game 1 85–70. In Game 2, the Silver Stars blew a 14-point lead in the final quarter, as the Sparks took a one-point lead with 1.3 seconds left. The Stars season was over unless there would be a miracle. However, Sophia Young delivered with a 14-foot turnaround shot to lift the Silver Stars to a 67–66 win. It came down to Game 3, with a trip to the WNBA Finals on the line. The two teams battled down the stretch, but the stellar play of Becky Hammon, who had 35 points and 4 crucial free throws, would lift the Silver Stars to their first WNBA Finals, defeating the Sparks 76–72. In the WNBA Finals, the Silver Stars faced the Detroit Shock, who were making their third WNBA Finals appearance in a row. In Game 1 at home, the Silver Stars fell behind early, but would tie the game at 69 with 2:15 left in the 4th quarter. But from there the Shock took control once again and won the game 77–69.

=== Struggling stars (2009–2010) ===
By the time the 2009 season opened, San Antonio were already on a struggling basis, being stuck in fourth place in the West throughout the year. However, the Silver Stars eventually started to rise a bit and later clinched a playoff berth, despite a sub-500 record of 15–19. After winning the first game against the Phoenix Mercury, the Silver Stars were unable to recover and lost the remaining two games to lose the series 2–1.

The 2010 season was not much different for the Stars. They finished with an unimpressive 14–20 record but sneaked into the third seed of the playoffs in a below-average Western Conference. The Silver Stars were swept in the first round of the playoffs by Phoenix and it was clear that some changes were needed.

=== Stars align in San Antonio (2011–2017) ===
In early 2011, it was announced that the Silver Stars would host the 2011 WNBA All-Star Game.

The Silver Stars started the 2011 season with a 7–3 record, led by the return of former head coach Dan Hughes. Along with the quality play from Becky Hammon and Sophia Young, three rookies made the Silver Stars' roster in 2011. Danielle Robinson, Danielle Adams, and Porsha Phillips were all drafted in 2011. Adams' play was so good that she was named Rookie of the Month for June, beating out top draft picks Maya Moore and Liz Cambage.

In the 2012 playoffs, the Silver Stars lost in the first round to the Los Angeles Sparks. The team would miss the playoffs in 2013. In the 2014 playoffs, the Stars would lose in the first round to the Minnesota Lynx. Hammon retired from the WNBA after 16 seasons (including spending the last eight with the Stars) afterwards.

Due to renovations at AT&T Center, the Stars played at Freeman Coliseum for the 2015 season. For the 2016 season, the Stars moved back to the AT&T Center after the renovations to the arena were completed.

=== Relocation to Las Vegas ===
The NBA and WNBA approved the sale of the Stars to MGM Resorts International on October 17, 2017, with the intention of relocating the team to Las Vegas and playing at the Mandalay Bay Events Center starting in the 2018 season.

=== Uniforms ===
- 2003–2006: At home, silver with black trim. Stars logo text is on the chest in black. Away from home, black with silver trim. Stars logo text is on the chest in white.
- 2007–2010: At home, silver with black stars down the side. Stars logo text is on the chest in black. Away from home, black with silver stars down the side. San Antonio text is on the chest in white. Player's names are beneath their numbers on the back of the uniform.
- 2011–2013: As part of the move to Adidas's Revolution 30 technology, the Silver Stars made subtle changes such as rounded numbers and team nickname on both uniforms. In the 2013 season, the numbers were slightly modified.
- 2014–2017: Uniform sponsor H-E-B was added, and the 'Stars' script was updated.

== Season-by-season records ==
Season	Team	Conference		Regular season			Playoff Results	Head coach
Season	Team	Conference		W	L	PCT	Playoff Results	Head coach
San Antonio Silver Stars
2003	2003	West	6th	12	22	.353	Did not qualify	C. Harvey (6–16); S. Dailey (6–6)
2004	2004	West	7th	9	25	.265	Did not qualify	D. Brown (6–20); S. Dailey (3–5)
2005	2005	West	7th	7	27	.206	Did not qualify	Dan Hughes
2006	2006	West	6th	13	21	.382	Did not qualify	Dan Hughes
2007	2007	West	2nd	20	14	.588	Won Conference Semifinals (Sacramento, 2–1); Lost Conference Finals (Phoenix, 0–2)	Dan Hughes
2008	2008	West	1st	24	10	.706	Won Conference Semifinals (Sacramento, 2–1); Won Conference Finals (Los Angeles, 2–1); Lost WNBA Finals (Detroit, 0–3)	Dan Hughes
2009	2009	West	4th	15	19	.441	Lost Conference Semifinals (Phoenix, 1–2)	Dan Hughes
2010	2010	West	3rd	14	20	.412	Lost Conference Semifinals (Phoenix, 0–2)	Sandy Brondello
2011	2011	West	4th	18	16	.529	Lost Conference Semifinals (Minnesota, 1–2)	Dan Hughes
2012	2012	West	3rd	21	13	.618	Lost Conference Semifinals (Los Angeles, 0–2)	Dan Hughes
2013	2013	West	5th	12	22	.353	Did not qualify	Dan Hughes
San Antonio Stars
2014	2014	West	3rd	16	18	.471	Lost Conference Semifinals (Minnesota, 0–2)	Dan Hughes
2015	2015	West	6th	8	26	.235	Did not qualify	Dan Hughes
2016	2016	West	6th	7	27	.206	Did not qualify	Dan Hughes
2017	2017	West	6th	8	26	.235	Did not qualify	Vickie Johnson
Regular season				291	405	.418	1 Conference Championship	
Playoffs				10	23	.303	0 WNBA Championships	

== Players ==
=== Former players ===
- Danielle Adams (2011–2015)
- Chantelle Anderson (2005–2007)
- Jayne Appel (2010–2016)
- Jennifer Azzi (2000–2003)
- Helen Darling (2007–2010)
- Margo Dydek (1998–2004)
- Shyra Ely (2005–2006)
- Marie Ferdinand-Harris (2001–2007)
- Adrienne Goodson (1999–2004)
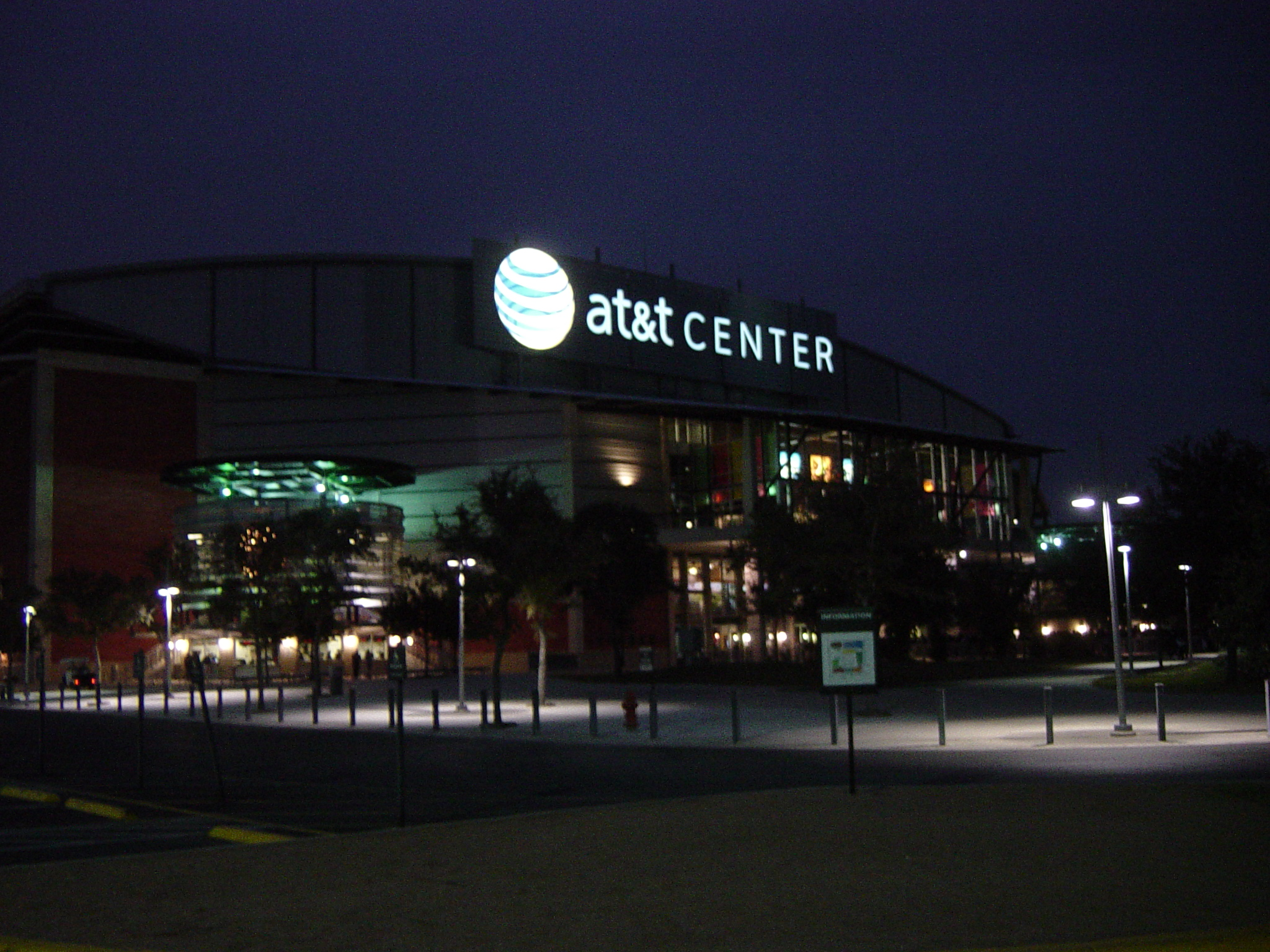
  The AT&T Center, home of the Stars since 2003, except for the 2015 season due to summer renovations.
- Becky Hammon (2007–2014), now the head coach of Las Vegas Aces
- Chamique Holdsclaw (2010)
- Shannon "Pee Wee" Johnson (2004–2006)
- Vickie Johnson (2006–2009)
- DeLisha Milton-Jones (2013), now the head coach for Old Dominion
- Wendy Palmer-Daniel (1997–1999, 2005)
- Jia Perkins (2011–2015)
- Erin Buescher Perperoglou (2007–2009)
- Semeka Randall (2002–2004)
- Ruth Riley (2007–2011)
- Danielle Robinson (2011–2016)
- Michelle Snow (2010)
- LaToya Thomas (2004–2006)
- Ann Wauters (2008–2009)
- Sophia Young (2006–2015)
- Shanna Zolman (2006–2007, 2009)
- Tausha Mills (2003)
- Shenise Johnson (2012-2014), now a member of the Minnesota Lynx
- Kelsey Plum (2017-2018), now a member of the Los Angeles Sparks
- Kayla McBride (2014-2018), now a member of the Minnesota Lynx

=== Retired numbers ===
San Antonio Stars retired numbers
No.	Player	Position	Tenure	Ref
25	Becky Hammon	G	2007–14	

=== FIBA Hall of Fame ===
San Antonio Stars Hall of Famers
Players
No.	Name	Position	Tenure	Inducted
12	Margo Dydek	C	2003–04	2019

== Coaches and staff ==
=== Owners ===
- Peter Holt, owner of the San Antonio Spurs (2003–2017)

=== Head coaches ===
San Antonio Stars head coaches
Name	Start	End	Seasons	Regular season				Playoffs			
Name	Start	End	Seasons	W	L	PCT	G	W	L	PCT	G
Candi Harvey	July 6, 2001	July 26, 2003	3	40	33	.548	73	2	5	.286	7
Shell Dailey	July 26, 2003	October 30, 2003	1	6	6	.500	12	0	0	.000	0
Dee Brown	October 30, 2003	July 30, 2004	1	6	20	.231	24	0	0	.000	0
Shell Dailey	August 10, 2004	end of 2004	1	3	5	.375	10	0	0	.000	0
Shell Dailey	Total		2	9	11	.450	22	0	0	.000	0
Dan Hughes	January 4, 2005	February 25, 2010	5	79	91	.465	170	7	10	.412	17
Sandy Brondello	February 25, 2010	September 27, 2010	1	14	20	.412	34	0	2	.000	2
Dan Hughes	January 28, 2011	end of 2016	6	82	122	.402	204	1	6	.143	7
Dan Hughes	Total		11	161	213	.430	374	8	16	.333	24
Vickie Johnson	December 22, 2016	October 17, 2017	1	8	26	.235	34	0	0	.000	0

=== General managers ===
- Jay Francis (1997–2004)
- Dan Hughes (2005–2015)
- Ruth Riley (2016–2017)

=== Assistant coaches ===
- Tammi Reiss (2001–2003)
- Shell Dailey (2003–2004)
- Vonn Read (2004)
- Brian Agler (2005–2007)
- Sandy Brondello (2005–2009)
- Vanessa Nygaard (2008)
- Olaf Lange (2008–2010)
- Vickie Johnson (2011–2016)
- Steve Shuman (2011–2012)
- James Wade (2013–2016)
- Joi Williams (2017)
- Latricia Trammell (2017)

== Statistics ==
San Antonio Stars statistics
2000s
Season	Individual			Team vs Opponents		
Season	PPG	RPG	APG	PPG	RPG	FG%
2003	M. Ferdinand (13.8)	M. Dydek (7.4)	J. Azzi (3.3)	65.1 vs 71.4	33.7 vs 34.5	.383 vs .398
2004	L. Thomas (14.2)	A. Goodson (6.9)	S. Johnson (4.4)	64.4 vs 69.5	29.5 vs 30.4	.419 vs .443
2005	M. Ferdinand (12.5)	W. Palmer (5.7)	S. Johnson (4.6)	63.0 vs 70.6	27.8 vs 31.0	.417 vs .436
2006	S. Young (12.0)	S. Young (7.6)	S. Johnson (3.7)	74.2 vs 76.6	34.4 vs 36.4	.406 vs .431
2007	B. Hammon (18.8)	E. Buescher (6.1)	B. Hammon (5.0)	74.0 vs 73.1	32.0 vs 33.4	.424 vs .423
2008	B. Hammon (17.6)	A. Wauters (7.5)	B. Hammon (4.9)	74.9 vs 71.1	32.1 vs 35.5	.433 vs .398
2009	B. Hammon (19.5)	S. Young (6.5)	B. Hammon (5.0)	76.9 vs 78.3	30.9 vs 34.9	.427 vs .439
2010s
Season	Individual			Team vs Opponents		
Season	PPG	RPG	APG	PPG	RPG	FG%
2010	S. Young (15.3)	M. Snow (6.2)	B. Hammon (5.4)	76.8 vs 80.1	30.1 vs 33.1	.461 vs .467
2011	B. Hammon (15.9)	S. Young (6.4)	B. Hammon (5.8)	77.6 vs 75.5	31.3 vs 37.0	.430 vs .427
2012	S. Young (16.3)	S. Young (7.2)	B. Hammon (5.3)	82.1 vs 76.9	33.2 vs 34.9	.445 vs .432
2013	D. Adams (14.4)	J. Appel (8.9)	D. Robinson (6.7)	72.1 vs 77.9	32.1 vs 36.5	.400 vs .455
2014	K. McBride (13.0)	J. Appel (7.9)	D. Robinson (5.3)	77.8 vs 79.6	31.7 vs 34.1	.430 vs .474
2015	K. McBride (13.8)	J. Appel (6.2)	D. Robinson (5.0)	68.1 vs 76.7	32.6 vs 35.6	.390 vs .459
2016	M. Jefferson (13.9)	J. Appel (5.4)	M. Jefferson (4.2)	72.0 vs 80.2	31.9 vs 35.7	.405 vs .438

== Media coverage ==
Broadcasters for the Stars games were Andrew Monaco and Bob Weiss. While in San Antonio, some Stars games were broadcast on Fox Sports Southwest (FS-SW), which is a local television station for the state of Texas.

== All-time notes ==
=== Regular season attendance ===
- A sellout for a basketball game at AT&T Center (San Antonio) (2003–2014, 2016–2017) is 18,418.
- A sellout for a basketball game at Freeman Coliseum (San Antonio) (2015) is 9,800.

Regular season all-time attendance
San Antonio Stars
Year	Average	High	Low	Sellouts	Total for year	WNBA game average
2003	10,384 (3rd)	15,593	7,692	0	176,526	8,826
2004	8,320 (6th)	10,506	5,764	0	141,444	8,589
2005	7,944 (8th)	9,772	5,508	0	135,054	8,172
2006	7,386 (10th)	10,634	5,998	0	125,564	7,476
2007	7,569 (10th)	10,262	4,070	0	128,680	7,819
2008	7,984 (9th)	16,255	5,705	0	135,722	7,948
2009	7,527 (10th)	10,572	4,723	0	127,957	8,029
2010	8,041 (7th)	12,414	4,924	0	136,696	7,834
2011	8,751 (4th)	14,797	6,358	0	148,767	7,954
2012	7,850 (4th)	15,184	5,023	0	133,454	7,452
2013	7,914 (5th)	12,086	5,390	0	134,532	7,531
2014	7,719 (7th)	12,659	5,012	0	131,226	7,578
2015	4,751 (12th)	9,080	1,738	0	80,766	7,184
2016	6,385 (9th)	11,171	3,319	0	108,551	7,655
2017	6,386 (10th)	9,621	3,210	0	108,562	7,716

=== Draft picks ===
- 2003 Miami/Portland Dispersal Draft: LaQuanda Barksdale (12)
- 2003: Coretta Brown (11), Ke-Ke Tardy (25), Brooke Armistead (40)
- 2004 Cleveland Dispersal Draft: LaToya Thomas (3)
- 2004: Cindy Dallas (21), Toccara Williams (34)
- 2005: Kendra Wecker (4), Shyra Ely (14), Catherine Kraayeveld (27)
- 2006: Sophia Young (4), Shanna Crossley (16), Khara Smith (30)
- 2007 Charlotte Dispersal Draft: Helen Darling (4)
- 2007: Camille Little (17), Nare Diawara (30)
- 2008: Chioma Nnamaka (21), Alex Anderson (39)
- 2009 Houston Dispersal Draft: selection waived
- 2009: Megan Frazee (14), Sonja Petrovic (26), Candyce Bingham (39)
- 2010 Sacramento Dispersal Draft: Laura Harper (5)
- 2010: Jayne Appel (5), Alysha Clark (17), Alexis Rack (29)
- 2011: Danielle Robinson (6), Danielle Adams (20), Porsha Phillips (30)
- 2012: Shenise Johnson (5)
- 2013: Kayla Alexander (8), Davellyn Whyte (16), Diandra Tchatchouang (20), Whitney Hand (32)
- 2014: Kayla McBride (3), Astou Ndour (16), Bri Kulas (28)
- 2015: Dearica Hamby (6), Dragana Stanković (30), Nikki Moody (33)
- 2016: Moriah Jefferson (2), Brittney Martin (25)
- 2017: Kelsey Plum (1), Nia Coffey (5), Schaquilla Nunn (25)

=== Trades ===
- January 28, 2004: The Silver Stars traded the fourth, 16th, and 29th picks in the 2004 Draft to the Connecticut Sun in exchange for Shannon Johnson, the 21st and the 34th picks in the 2004 Draft.
- July 19, 2004: The Silver Stars traded Gwen Jackson to the Phoenix Mercury in exchange for Adrian Williams.
- April 16, 2005: The Silver Stars traded Margo Dydek to the Connecticut Sun in exchange for Katie Feenstra and a first-round pick in the 2006 Draft.
- May 18, 2005: The Silver Stars traded Connecticut's first-round pick in the 2006 Draft to the Sacramento Monarchs in exchange for Chantelle Anderson.
- February 21, 2007: The Silver Stars traded a second-round pick in the 2007 Draft to the Phoenix Mercury in exchange for Sandora Irvin.
- February 22, 2007: The Silver Stars traded Katie Feenstra and the right to swap first-round picks in the 2008 Draft to the Detroit Shock in exchange for Ruth Riley.
- April 4, 2007: The Silver Stars traded Jessica Davenport and a first-round pick in the 2008 Draft to the New York Liberty in exchange for Becky Hammon and a second-round pick in the 2008 Draft.
- April 9, 2008: The Silver Stars traded Camille Little, Chioma Nnamaka, and a first-round pick in the 2009 Draft to the Atlanta Dream in exchange for Ann Wauters, Morenike Atunrase, and a second-round pick in the 2009 Draft.
- February 19, 2010: The Silver Stars acquired Roneeka Hodges from the Minnesota Lynx in exchange for the right to swap second-round picks in the 2011 Draft.
- March 11, 2010: The Silver Stars acquired Michelle Snow from the Atlanta Dream in exchange for Dalma Ivanyi and the right to swap second-round picks in the 2011 Draft.
- April 14, 2010: The Silver Stars traded Shanna Crossley to the Tulsa Shock in exchange for Crystal Kelly.
- April 20, 2011: The Silver Stars traded Michelle Snow to the Chicago Sky in exchange for Jia Perkins.
- May 2, 2011: The Silver Stars traded second- and third-round picks in the 2012 Draft to the Tulsa Shock in exchange for Scholanda Robinson.
- March 1, 2012: The Silver Stars traded Roneeka Hodges to the Indiana Fever in exchange for Tangela Smith.
- March 14, 2012: The Silver Stars traded Sonja Petrovic to the Chicago Sky in exchange for a third-round pick in the 2013 Draft.
- March 12, 2015: The Stars traded Shenise Johnson and a second-round pick in the 2015 Draft to the Indiana Fever in exchange for a first- and third-round picks in the 2015 Draft.
- April 16, 2015: The Stars traded the 9th overall pick in the 2015 Draft to the New York Liberty in exchange for Alex Montgomery.
- July 5, 2015: The Stars traded a second-round pick in the 2016 Draft to the Atlanta Dream in exchange for Samantha Logic.
- April 14, 2016: The Stars traded Jia Perkins to the Minnesota Lynx in exchange for Jazmon Gwathmey.
- May 9, 2016: The Stars traded a second-round pick in the 2017 Draft to the Phoenix Mercury in exchange for Monique Currie.
- January 31, 2017: The Stars traded Danielle Robinson to the Phoenix Mercury in exchange for Isabelle Harrison and the 5th pick in the 2017 Draft.
- February 27, 2017: The Stars traded Astou Ndour to the Chicago Sky in exchange for Clarissa Dos Santos.
- May 9, 2017: The Stars traded Jazmon Gwathmey to the Indiana Fever in exchange for the Fever's 2018 3rd round pick.
- June 28, 2017: The Stars traded Monique Currie to Phoenix Mercury for Shay Murphy, Sophie Brunner and Mercury's 2018 3rd Round Draft Pick.

=== All-Stars ===
- 2003: Margo Dydek, Marie Ferdinand-Harris
- 2004: Shannon Johnson
- 2005: Marie Ferdinand-Harris
- 2006: Sophia Young
- 2007: Becky Hammon, Sophia Young
- 2008: No All-Star Game
- 2009: Becky Hammon, Sophia Young
- 2010: Jayne Appel, Becky Hammon, Michelle Snow, Sophia Young
- 2011: Danielle Adams, Becky Hammon
- 2012: No All-Star Game
- 2013: Danielle Robinson
- 2014: Danielle Robinson
- 2015: Kayla McBride, Danielle Robinson
- 2016: No All-Star Game

=== Olympians ===
- 2004: Shannon Johnson
- 2008: Becky Hammon (RUS)
- 2012: Becky Hammon (RUS)
- 2016: Astou Ndour (ESP)

=== Honors and awards ===
- 2005 All-Rookie Team: Katie Feenstra
- 2006 All-Rookie Team: Sophia Young
- 2007 All-WNBA First Team: Becky Hammon
- 2007 All-WNBA Second Team: Sophia Young
- 2007 All-Rookie Team: Camille Little
- 2007 Coach of the Year: Dan Hughes
- 2007 Peak Performer (Assists): Becky Hammon
- 2008 All-WNBA First Team: Sophia Young
- 2008 All-WNBA Second Team: Becky Hammon
- 2008 All-Defensive First Team: Sophia Young
- 2008 Kim Perrot Sportsmanship Award: Vickie Johnson
- 2009 All-WNBA First Team: Becky Hammon
- 2009 All-WNBA Second Team: Sophia Young
- 2011 Kim Perrot Sportsmanship Award: Ruth Riley
- 2011 All-Rookie Team: Danielle Adams
- 2011 All-Rookie Team: Danielle Robinson
- 2012 All-WNBA Second Team: Sophia Young
- 2012 All-Defensive Second Team: Danielle Robinson
- 2012 All-Defensive Second Team: Sophia Young
- 2013 Peak Performer (Assists): Danielle Robinson
- 2013 All-Defensive Second Team: Jia Perkins
- 2013 All-Defensive Second Team: Danielle Robinson
- 2014 Kim Perrot Sportsmanship Award: Becky Hammon
- 2014 All-WNBA Second Team: Danielle Robinson
- 2014 All-Defensive Second Team: Danielle Robinson
- 2014 All-Rookie Team: Kayla McBride
- 2016 All-Rookie Team: Moriah Jefferson

Sporting positions
Preceded by Phoenix Mercury	WNBA Western Conference Champions; 2008 (First title)	Succeeded by Phoenix Mercury
