= Tangela Smith =

American basketball player (born 1977)

Phoenix Mercury
- Title: Assistant coach
- League: Women's National Basketball Association

Personal information
- Born: April 1, 1977 (age 49) Chicago, Illinois, U.S.
- Listed height: 6 ft 3 in (1.91 m)
- Listed weight: 158 lb (72 kg)

Career information
- High school: George Washington (Chicago, Illinois)
- College: Iowa (1994–1998)
- WNBA draft: 1998: 2nd round, 12th overall pick
- Drafted by: Sacramento Monarchs
- Playing career: 1998–2012
- Position: Power forward / center
- Number: 50, 5
- Coaching career: 2014–present

Career history

Playing
- 1998–2004: Sacramento Monarchs
- 2005–2006: Charlotte Sting
- 2007–2010: Phoenix Mercury
- 2011: Indiana Fever
- 2012: San Antonio Stars

Coaching
- 2014–2018: Western Michigan (assistant)
- 2018–2026: Northwestern (assistant)
- 2026–present: Phoenix Mercury (assistant)

Career highlights
- WNBA All-Star (2006); 2× WNBA champion (2007, 2009); 2× First-team All-Big Ten (1996, 1998); Big Ten Player of the Year (1998); Chicago Tribune Silver Basketball (1998)
- Stats at WNBA.com
- Stats at Basketball Reference
Medals
Women's basketball
Representing United States
Jones Cup
| Silver medal – second place | 1997 Taipei | Team competition |

Tangela Nicole Smith (born April 1, 1977) is an American former basketball player in the WNBA. Smith played the bulk of her career for the Sacramento Monarchs and the Phoenix Mercury where she won two WNBA Championships. She is currently an assistant coach for the Phoenix Mercury.

== High school ==
Born and raised in Chicago, Illinois, Smith attended George Washington High School, where she was named a 1994 Kodak High School All-American. Smith was named a High School All-American by the WBCA. She participated in the WBCA High School All-America Game in 1994, scoring three points.

== College ==
Smith graduated from the University of Iowa in 1998. She won the 1998 Big Ten Player of the Year award. She was also a 1998 Kodak/WBCA All-America honorable mention and earned 1996 and 1998 All-Big Ten first team and 1997 All-Big Ten honorable mention accolades.Big Ten Hall Of Fame inductee.

== USA Basketball ==
Smith competed with USA Basketball as a member of the 1997 Jones Cup Team that won the silver medal in Taipei. Several of the games were close, with the USA team winning four games by six points or fewer, including an overtime game in the semifinal match against Japan. The gold medal game against South Korea was also close, but the USA fell 76–71 to claim the silver medal for the event. Smith averaged 8.0 points per game.

== WNBA career ==
Smith was selected 12th overall in the 1998 WNBA draft by the Sacramento Monarchs. She played 6 seasons for the Monarchs, helping them reach the playoffs five times.

In 2005, she was traded to the Sting in exchange for Nicole Powell. Charlotte folded following the 2006 season and Smith's rights were acquired by the Minnesota Lynx in the 2007 dispersal draft.

On draft day in April 2007, she was traded to the Phoenix Mercury for No. 1 overall pick Lindsey Harding.

On Friday, 13 August 2010 she overtook Vickie Johnson and became the WNBA's all-time leader in games played with 411 in 13 seasons. During her time in the league she missed 15 games.

== International career ==
In the WNBA offseason in 1998–99, Smith was a professional basketball player in Italy, Israel, South Korea and Turkey. In 2001, she helped the Botasspor squad win the Turkish league crown. In 2002, she helped the Shinsegae Coolcats win the Korean league championship. Now she plays in the Hungarian Championship since February 2013, for the 2012 Champion Team, HAT-AGRO UNI Győr.

== Coaching career ==
Tangela Smith began her coaching career in 2014 at Western Michigan University on Shane Clipfell's staff. As an assistant coach, Smith helped WMU to a 74–56 record over four seasons.

On July 6, 2018, it was announced that Smith was hired as an assistant coach and would join Joe McKeown's staff at Northwestern University. This would mark a return to the Big 10 where she played collegiately.

== Career statistics ==
Legend
| GP | Games played | GS | Games started | MPG | Minutes per game | RPG | Rebounds per game |
| APG | Assists per game | SPG | Steals per game | BPG | Blocks per game | PPG | Points per game |
| TO | Turnovers per game | FG% | Field-goal percentage | 3P% | 3-point field-goal percentage | FT% | Free-throw percentage |
| **Bold** | Career best | ° | League leader |

=== WNBA career statistics ===
==== Regular season ====
| Year | Team | GP | GS | MPG | FG% | 3P% | FT% | RPG | APG | SPG | BPG | TO | PPG |
|---|---|---|---|---|---|---|---|---|---|---|---|---|---|
| 1998 | Sacramento | 28 | 10 | 25.3 | 40.1 | 35.7 | 74.1 | 4.6 | 1.0 | 0.6 | 1.6 | 1.7 | 9.6 |
| 1999 | Sacramento | 31 | 3 | 20.4 | 44.3 | **50.0** | 65.3 | 3.8 | 0.5 | 0.8 | 1.2 | 1.2 | 8.3 |
| 2000 | Sacramento | 32 | 32 | 28.9 | **47.4** | 0.0 | 78.3 | 5.6 | 1.3 | 0.9 | **2.0** | 1.9 | 12.1 |
| 2001 | Sacramento | 32 | 32 | 28.5 | 42.0 | 0.0 | 72.9 | 5.6 | 1.3 | 1.1 | 1.7 | 2.1 | 11.2 |
| 2002 | Sacramento | 32 | 32 | 33.2 | 42.3 | 35.7 | 85.1 | 5.9 | 1.3 | 0.8 | 1.4 | 1.8 | **14.7** |
| 2003 | Sacramento | **34** | **34** | 29.0 | 44.0 | 26.5 | 70.7 | 5.5 | **1.5** | 1.3 | 0.9 | 1.6 | 12.6 |
| 2004 | Sacramento | **34** | 33 | 26.7 | 41.1 | 17.2 | 80.4 | 4.1 | **1.5** | 1.1 | 0.7 | 1.6 | 11.2 |
| 2005 | Charlotte | 31 | 31 | **34.3** | 41.7 | 0.0 | 79.8 | 5.2 | 1.3 | **1.6** | 1.0 | 2.7 | 13.6 |
| 2006 | Charlotte | **34** | **34** | 28.6 | 42.1 | 36.5 | 74.4 | 5.3 | **1.5** | 1.2 | 0.9 | 2.1 | 13.1 |
| 2007 | Phoenix | **34** | **34** | 31.5 | 41.4 | 32.8 | 78.8 | 6.5 | 1.3 | 1.2 | 1.6 | 1.6 | 12.6 |
| 2008 | Phoenix | 25 | 25 | 28.9 | 41.7 | 34.8 | 86.7 | **7.0** | 1.1 | 1.1 | 1.2 | 1.6 | 11.1 |
| 2009 | Phoenix | **34** | **34** | 27.1 | 45.1 | 45.2 | 87.0 | 5.4 | 0.8 | 1.0 | 1.7 | 1.1 | 9.9 |
| 2010 | Phoenix | **34** | **34** | 29.2 | 39.5 | 34.7 | 75.0 | 5.2 | 0.9 | 0.7 | 0.9 | 1.1 | 9.2 |
| 2011 | Indiana | 33 | 32 | 21.5 | 37.1 | 34.0 | 88.2 | 3.1 | **1.5** | 0.7 | 0.5 | 1.3 | 7.2 |
| 2012 | San Antonio | 15 | 0 | 10.0 | 41.7 | 28.6 | **100.0** | 1.1 | 0.9 | 0.1 | 0.2 | **0.5** | 2.5 |
| Career | 15 years, 5 teams | 463 | 400 | 27.5 | 42.3 | 34.3 | 77.7 | 5.0 | 1.2 | 1.0 | 1.2 | 1.6 | 10.9 |

==== Playoffs ====
| Year | Team | GP | GS | MPG | FG% | 3P% | FT% | RPG | APG | SPG | BPG | TO | PPG |
|---|---|---|---|---|---|---|---|---|---|---|---|---|---|
| 1999 | Sacramento | 1 | 1 | **38.0** | 37.5 | 0.0 | 33.3 | 2.0 | 0.0 | **3.0** | 1.0 | 1.0 | 14.0 |
| 2000 | Sacramento | 2 | 2 | 29.5 | 40.9 | 0.0 | 75.0 | 4.0 | 0.5 | 1.0 | 0.5 | 1.0 | 10.5 |
| 2001 | Sacramento | 5 | 5 | 32.8 | 38.3 | 0.0 | 81.8 | 4.8 | 1.6 | 1.0 | 1.0 | 0.8 | 11.0 |
| 2003 | Sacramento | 6 | 6 | 29.3 | 39.7 | 33.3 | 70.0 | 7.7 | 1.8 | 0.8 | 0.5 | 1.8 | 12.8 |
| 2004 | Sacramento | 6 | 6 | 30.8 | 44.2 | 22.2 | 77.3 | 5.2 | 1.3 | 1.5 | **2.0** | 1.8 | **15.8** |
| 2007 | Phoenix | 9 | 9 | 31.8 | 40.7 | 48.4 | 80.0 | **7.8** | 1.7 | 1.0 | 1.8 | 1.4 | 11.7 |
| 2009 | Phoenix | **11** | **11** | 26.4 | **52.6** | **52.6** | 75.0 | 5.8 | 0.8 | 1.4 | 0.8 | 0.6 | 9.9 |
| 2010 | Phoenix | 4 | 4 | 32.3 | 48.3 | 35.3 | 75.0 | 6.5 | **2.3** | 0.5 | 1.3 | 1.3 | 9.3 |
| 2011 | Indiana | 6 | 6 | 27.5 | 40.7 | 40.9 | **100.0** | 5.3 | 1.7 | 0.8 | 1.0 | 2.2 | 9.5 |
| 2012 | San Antonio | 2 | 0 | 4.5 | 33.3 | 0.0 | 0.0 | 0.5 | 0.5 | 0.0 | 0.0 | **0.0** | 1.0 |
| Career | 10 years, 4 teams | 52 | 50 | 28.9 | 42.9 | 43.2 | 74.8 | 5.8 | 1.4 | 1.1 | 1.1 | 1.3 | 11.0 |

=== College career statistics ===
| Year | Team | GP | GS | MPG | FG% | 3P% | FT% | RPG | APG | SPG | BPG | TO | PPG |
|---|---|---|---|---|---|---|---|---|---|---|---|---|---|
| 1994–95 | Iowa | 28 | - | - | 45.3 | 0.0 | 64.4 | 7.5 | 0.7 | 0.9 | **2.6** | - | 9.0 |
| 1995–96 | Iowa | **31** | - | - | 47.1 | **11.1** | 68.1 | 7.0 | **2.5** | 1.3 | 2.2 | - | 13.6 |
| 1996-97 | Iowa | 30 | - | - | 53.2 | 0.0 | 68.5 | 6.2 | 1.2 | 1.3 | 1.3 | - | 11.6 |
| 1997-98 | Iowa | 29 | - | - | **55.9** | 0.0 | **70.3** | **8.4** | 1.3 | **1.4** | 1.9 | - | **19.9** |
| **Career** | | 118 | - | - | 51.0 | 6.7 | 68.3 | 7.3 | 1.5 | 1.2 | 2.0 | - | 13.5 |
Statistics retrieved from Sports-Reference.
