= Holifield =

Holifield is a surname. Notable people with the surname include:

- Chester E. Holifield (1903–1995), United States Representative from California
- John Holifield (born 1964), American football running back for the West Virginia Mountaineers

== See also ==
- Mike Hollifield (born 1961), English footballer
- Holyfield (surname)

== See also ==
- Ruthie Bolton-Holifield (born 1967), former collegiate, Olympic and professional basketball player
