= 2001 Sacramento Monarchs season =

- Head coach: Sonny Allen (resigned Jun. 26, 6–6 record); Maura McHugh (14–6 record)
- Arena: ARCO Arena

Results
- Record: 20–12 (.625)
- Place: 2nd (Western)
- Playoff finish: Lost Conference Finals (2-1) to Los Angeles Sparks

Media
- Television: KMAX (UPN 31)

The 2001 WNBA season was the 5th season for the Sacramento Monarchs. The team won their first playoff series, but they were later defeated by eventual champion Los Angeles Sparks in the conference finals.

== Transactions ==
=== WNBA draft ===
Round	Pick	Player	Nationality	School/Team/Country
2	30	Jackie Moore	United States	Long Beach State
3	46	Maren Walseth	United States	Penn State
4	62	Katie Smrcka-Duffy	United States	Georgetown

=== Transactions ===
Date	Transaction
April 11, 2001	Traded a 2001 1st Round Pick to the Indiana Fever in exchange for Kara Wolters
April 20, 2001	Drafted Jackie Moore, Maren Walseth and Katie Smrcka-Duffy in the 2001 WNBA draft
April 24, 2001	Traded Katy Steding and a 2002 2nd Round Pick to the Seattle Storm in exchange for Edna Campbell and a 2002 4th Round Pick
April 30, 2001	Signed Dana Wynne, Maxann Reese, Monique Ambers and Ryneldi Becenti
May 9, 2001	Waived Katie Smrcka-Duffy
May 11, 2001	Waived Linda Burgess
May 24, 2001	Waived Dana Wynne and Jackie Moore
May 27, 2001	Suspended contract of Yolanda Griffith
June 6, 2001	Waived Monique Ambers
June 15, 2001	Waived Maren Walseth
June 26, 2001	Sonny Allen resigned as Head Coach
June 26, 2001	Hired Maura McHugh as Head Coach

== Roster ==
2001 Sacramento Monarchs roster
Players
Coaches

Pos.	No.	Nat.	Name	Height	Weight	DOB	From	Yrs
G	5	(United States)	Blodgett, Cindy	5' 9" (1.75m)	130 lb (59kg)	1975-12-13	Maine	3
G	6	(United States)	Bolton, Ruthie	5' 9" (1.75m)	150 lb (68kg)	1967-05-27	Auburn	4
G	12	(United States)	Campbell, Edna	5' 8" (1.73m)	152 lb (69kg)	1968-11-26	Texas	2
G	24	(United States)	Clinesmith, Stacy	5' 5" (1.65m)	125 lb (57kg)	1978-04-22	UC Santa Barbara	1
F	0	(United States)	Frett, La'Keshia	6' 3" (1.91m)	170 lb (77kg)	1975-06-12	Georgia	2
F/C	33	(United States)	Griffith, Yolanda	6' 4" (1.93m)	175 lb (79kg)	1970-03-01	Florida Atlantic	2
F	27	(United States)	Hardmon, Lady	5' 10" (1.78m)	160 lb (73kg)	1970-09-12	Georgia	4
F	25	(United States)	Holland-Corn, Kedra	5' 8" (1.73m)	129 lb (59kg)	1974-11-02	Georgia	2
G	21	(Portugal)	Penicheiro, Ticha	5' 11" (1.8m)	146 lb (66kg)	1974-09-18	Old Dominion	3
C	50	(United States)	Smith, Tangela	6' 3" (1.91m)	158 lb (72kg)	1977-04-01	Iowa	3
F	54	(United States)	Walseth, Maren	6' 2" (1.88m)		1978-10-28	Penn State	R
C	52	(United States)	Wolters, Kara	6' 7" (2.01m)	227 lb (103kg)	1975-08-15	Connecticut	2
F	10	(United States)	Wynne, Dana	6' 2" (1.88m)		1975-02-02	Seton Hall	R

Head coach
(United States) Maura McHugh (Old Dominion)
Assistant coaches
(United States) Al Biancani
(United States) Jill Jackson
(United States) Michele Cherry
(United States) Steve Shuman

Legend

- (C) Team captain
- (DP) Unsigned draft pick
- (FA) Free agent
- (S) Suspended
- Injured

== Schedule ==
=== Regular season ===
2001 game log
Total: 20–12 (Home: 12–4; Road: 8–8)
June: 8–6 (Home: 4–3; Road: 4–3)

Game	Date	Team	Score	High points	High rebounds	High assists	Location Attendance	Record
1	June 2	Cleveland	W 70–65	Edna Campbell (15)	Tangela Smith (6)	Stacy Clinesmith (4)	ARCO Arena	1–0
2	June 4	@ New York	W 80–63	Yolanda Griffith (22)	Yolanda Griffith (10)	Ruthie Bolton (4)	Madison Square Garden	2–0
3	June 5	@ Washington	L 72–75	Tangela Smith (22)	Yolanda Griffith (20)	Edna Campbell (6)	MCI Center	2–1
4	June 7	Charlotte	W 77–65	Yolanda Griffith (30)	Yolanda Griffith (18)	Edna Campbell (4)	ARCO Arena	3–1
5	June 9	Miami	L 67–71	Kedra Holland-Corn (16)	Yolanda Griffith (9)	Kedra Holland-Corn (5)	ARCO Arena	3–2
6	June 12	@ Phoenix	L 64–78	Yolanda Griffith (17)	Yolanda Griffith (13)	Kedra Holland-Corn (4)	America West Arena	3–3
7	June 14	Phoenix	W 81–59	Yolanda Griffith (15)	Yolanda Griffith (18)	Kedra Holland-Corn (4)	ARCO Arena	4–3
8	June 16	Portland	L 74–81 (OT)	Yolanda Griffith (17)	Yolanda Griffith (17)	Griffith; Penicheiro (5)	ARCO Arena	4–4
9	June 19	New York	L 56–65	La'Keshia Frett (17)	Yolanda Griffith (10)	Edna Campbell (5)	ARCO Arena	4–5
10	June 21	@ Utah	W 87–75	Kedra Holland-Corn (26)	Yolanda Griffith (14)	Edna Campbell (8)	Delta Center	5–5
11	June 23	@ Houston	L 56–70	Ruthie Bolton (15)	Ticha Penicheiro (7)	Ticha Penicheiro (12)	Compaq Center	5–6
12	June 24	@ Charlotte	W 85–82	Yolanda Griffith (23)	Yolanda Griffith (16)	Ticha Penicheiro (6)	Charlotte Coliseum	6–6
13	June 28	Houston	W 64–54	Kara Wolters (18)	Yolanda Griffith (12)	Ticha Penicheiro (4)	ARCO Arena	7–6
14	June 30	@ Seattle	W 65–59	Yolanda Griffith (15)	Tangela Smith (9)	Ticha Penicheiro (5)	KeyArena	8–6

July : 7–4 (Home: 5–1; Road: 2–3)

Game	Date	Team	Score	High points	High rebounds	High assists	Location Attendance	Record
15	July 3	@ Minnesota	W 91–52	Kedra Holland-Corn (25)	Kedra Holland-Corn (9)	Ticha Penicheiro (6)	Target Center	9–6
16	July 6	@ Orlando	W 75–68	Lady Hardmon (13)	Kedra Holland-Corn (4)	Ticha Penicheiro (8)	TD Waterhouse Centre	10–6
17	July 7	@ Miami	L 54–66	Yolanda Griffith (20)	Yolanda Griffith (11)	Ticha Penicheiro (4)	American Airlines Arena	10–7
18	July 10	Houston	W 78–76 (2OT)	Yolanda Griffith (29)	Yolanda Griffith (15)	Ticha Penicheiro (9)	ARCO Arena	11–7
19	July 12	Utah	W 69–67	Tangela Smith (27)	Yolanda Griffith (12)	Ticha Penicheiro (10)	ARCO Arena	12–7
20	July 14	@ Utah	L 57–69	Yolanda Griffith (18)	Yolanda Griffith (9)	Ticha Penicheiro (11)	Delta Center	12–8
21	July 19	Los Angeles	L 68–83	Edna Campbell (18)	Yolanda Griffith (7)	Bolton; Penicheiro (5)	ARCO Arena	12–9
22	July 21	Detroit	W 66–52	Yolanda Griffith (19)	Yolanda Griffith (13)	Ticha Penicheiro (6)	ARCO Arena	13–9
23	July 25	@ Los Angeles	L 78–80	Kedra Holland-Corn (21)	Yolanda Griffith (13)	Edna Campbell (8)	Staples Center	13–10
24	July 27	Portland	W 85–62	Kedra Holland-Corn (17)	Tangela Smith (8)	Ticha Penicheiro (8)	ARCO Arena	14–10
25	July 29	Phoenix	W 63–47	Yolanda Griffith (25)	Yolanda Griffith (17)	Bolton; Penicheiro (5)	ARCO Arena	15–10

August : 5–2 (Home: 3–0; Road: 2–2)

Game	Date	Team	Score	High points	High rebounds	High assists	Location Attendance	Record
26	August 2	@ Los Angeles	L 62–67	Edna Campbell (21)	Yolanda Griffith (9)	Ticha Penicheiro (11)	Staples Center	15–11
27	August 3	Indiana	W 81–69	Griffith; Frett (18)	Tangela Smith (7)	Ticha Penicheiro (11)	ARCO Arena	16–11
28	August 5	@ Minnesota	L 76–79 (OT)	Ticha Penicheiro (17)	Yolanda Griffith (12)	Ticha Penicheiro (10)	Target Center	16–12
29	August 7	Minnesota	W 76–59	Yolanda Griffith (27)	Yolanda Griffith (11)	Ticha Penicheiro (14)	ARCO Arena	17–12
30	August 11	Seattle	W 81–61	Yolanda Griffith (25)	Ruthie Bolton (8)	Ticha Penicheiro (7)	ARCO Arena	18–12
31	August 12	@ Portland	W 64–58	Ruthie Bolton (21)	Yolanda Griffith (15)	Ticha Penicheiro (5)	Rose Garden	19–12
32	August 14	@ Seattle	W 72–62	Yolanda Griffith (19)	Yolanda Griffith (16)	Ticha Penicheiro (4)	KeyArena	20–12

2001 season schedule

=== Playoffs ===
2001 playoff game log
First round vs. Utah Starzz
Won Series: 2–0

Game	Date	Team	Score	High points	High rebounds	High assists	Location Attendance	Record
1	August 17	@ Utah	W 89–65	Yolanda Griffith (28)	Yolanda Griffith (12)	Ticha Penicheiro (9)	Delta Center	1–0
2	August 19	Utah	W 71–66	Yolanda Griffith (30)	Yolanda Griffith (14)	Ticha Penicheiro (7)	ARCO Arena	2–0

Conference Finals vs. Los Angeles Sparks
Lost Series: 1–2

Game	Date	Team	Score	High points	High rebounds	High assists	Location Attendance	Record
1	August 24	Los Angeles	L 73–74	Yolanda Griffith (18)	Griffith; Smith (6)	Ticha Penicheiro (5)	ARCO Arena	0–1
2	August 26	@ Los Angeles	W 80–60	Yolanda Griffith (24)	Yolanda Griffith (8)	Ticha Penicheiro (7)	Staples Center	1–1
3	August 27	@ Los Angeles	L 62–93	Kedra Holland-Corn (12)	Tangela Smith (6)	Ticha Penicheiro (5)	Staples Center	1–2

2001 playoff schedule

=== Season standings ===
Western Conference	W	L	PCT	Conf.	GB
Los Angeles Sparks ^{x}	28	4	.875	19–2	–
Sacramento Monarchs ^{x}	20	12	.625	13–8	8.0
Utah Starzz ^{x}	19	13	.594	11–10	9.0
Houston Comets ^{x}	19	13	.594	13–8	9.0
Phoenix Mercury ^{o}	13	19	.406	8–13	15.0
Minnesota Lynx ^{o}	12	20	.375	9–12	16.0
Portland Fire ^{o}	11	21	.344	5–16	17.0
Seattle Storm ^{o}	10	22	.313	6–15	18.0

== Statistics ==
Legend
GP	Games played	GS	Games started	MPG	Minutes per game	RPG	Rebounds per game
APG	Assists per game	SPG	Steals per game	BPG	Blocks per game	PPG	Points per game
FG%	Field-goal percentage	3P%	3-point field-goal percentage	FT%	Free-throw percentage	TO	Turnovers per game
PF	Fouls per game		Team leader		League leader

=== Regular season ===
Player	GP	GS	MPG	FG%	3P%	FT%	RPG	APG	SPG	BPG	PPG
Yolanda Griffith	32	31	33.7	.522	N/A	.720	11.2	1.7	2.0	1.2	16.2
Ticha Penichiero	23	22	32.3	.339	.262	.766	3.7	7.5	1.7	0.3	6.3
Tangela Smith	32	32	28.5	.420	.000	.729	5.6	1.3	1.1	1.7	11.2
Kedra Holland-Corn	32	32	27.3	.442	.393	.683	2.3	2.2	1.8	0.2	10.1
Edna Campbell	32	32	26.7	.377	.457	.767	2.7	2.3	0.6	0.3	8.1
Ruthie Bolton	31	0	18.8	.338	.364	.692	3.0	1.8	0.9	0.0	7.2
Lady Hardmon	31	0	17.5	.430	N/A	.741	2.5	1.2	0.5	0.3	4.5
La'Keshia Frett	30	10	13.4	.389	N/A	.857	1.8	0.6	0.3	0.2	4.3
Kara Wolters	31	1	12.2	.470	N/A	.806	2.4	0.5	0.1	0.8	4.9
Cindy Blodgett	11	0	6.5	.448	.533	N/A	0.8	0.5	0.5	0.1	3.1
Stacy Clinesmith	16	0	4.7	.286	.200	N/A	0.2	0.9	0.1	0.0	0.6
Dana Wynne	1	0	3.0	N/A	N/A	1.000	1.0	0.0	0.0	1.0	2.0
Maren Walseth	4	0	2.0	.500	N/A	1.000	0.5	0.0	0.0	0.0	1.0

^{‡}Waived/Released during the season
^{†}Traded during the season
^{≠}Acquired during the season
