= 1999 Sacramento Monarchs season =

- Coach: Sonny Allen
- Arena: ARCO Arena
- Attendance: per game

Results
- Record: 19–13 (.594)
- Place: 3rd (Western)
- Playoff finish: Lost First Round (1-0) to Los Angeles Sparks

The 1999 WNBA season was the 3rd season for the Sacramento Monarchs. The Monarchs made their first postseason appearance but lost to the Los Angeles Sparks in the first round.

== Transactions ==
=== Minnesota Lynx expansion draft ===
The following player was selected in the Minnesota Lynx expansion draft from the Sacramento Monarchs:

| Player | Nationality | School/Team/Country |
|---|---|---|
| Adia Barnes | United States | Arizona |

=== WNBA draft ===
| Round | Pick | Player | Nationality | School/Team/Country |
|---|---|---|---|---|
| 1 | 2 | Yolanda Griffith | United States | Chicago Condors |
| 2 | 14 | Kedra Holland-Corn | United States | San Jose Lasers |
| 3 | 26 | Kate Starbird | United States | Seattle Reign |
| 4 | 38 | Amy Herrig | United States | Iowa |

=== Transactions ===
| Date | Transaction |
|---|---|
| October 1, 1998 | Fired Heidi VanDerveer as Head Coach |
| February 8, 1999 | Fired Sonny Allen as Head Coach |
| April 6, 1999 | Lost Adia Barnes to the Minnesota Lynx in the WNBA expansion draft |
| May 3, 1999 | Waived Bridgette Gordon, Franthea Price, Nadine Domond and Pauline Jordan |
| May 4, 1999 | Drafted Yolanda Griffith, Kedra Holland-Corn, Kate Starbird and Amy Herrig in the 1999 WNBA draft |
| May 24, 1999 | Traded Quacy Barnes to the Cleveland Rockers in exchange for Cindy Blodgett |
| June 7, 1999 | Waived Amy Herrig |

== Roster ==
1999 Sacramento Monarchs roster
Players
Coaches

| Pos. | No. | Nat. | Name | Height | Weight | DOB | From | Yrs |
|---|---|---|---|---|---|---|---|---|
| G | 5 | (United States) | Blodgett, Cindy | 5' 9" (1.75m) | 130 lb (59kg) | 1975-12-13 | Maine | 1 |
| G | 6 | (United States) | Bolton, Ruthie | 5' 9" (1.75m) | 150 lb (68kg) | 1967-05-27 | Auburn | 2 |
| C | 31 | (United States) | Burge, Heather | 6' 5" (1.96m) | 195 lb (88kg) | 1971-11-12 | Virginia | R |
| F | 42 | (United States) | Burgess, Linda | 6' 1" (1.85m) | 173 lb (78kg) | 1969-07-27 | Alabama | 2 |
| G/F | 51 | (United States) | Byears, Latasha | 5' 11" (1.8m) | 206 lb (93kg) | 1973-08-12 | DePaul | 2 |
| F/C | 33 | (United States) | Griffith, Yolanda | 6' 4" (1.93m) | 175 lb (79kg) | 1970-03-01 | Florida Atlantic | R |
| F | 27 | (United States) | Hardmon, Lady | 5' 10" (1.78m) | 160 lb (73kg) | 1970-09-12 | Georgia | 2 |
| F | 25 | (United States) | Holland-Corn, Kedra | 5' 8" (1.73m) | 129 lb (59kg) | 1974-11-02 | Georgia | R |
| G | 21 | (Portugal) | Penicheiro, Ticha | 5' 11" (1.8m) | 146 lb (66kg) | 1974-09-18 | Old Dominion | 1 |
| C | 50 | (United States) | Smith, Tangela | 6' 3" (1.91m) | 158 lb (72kg) | 1977-04-01 | Iowa | 1 |
| G/F | 30 | (United States) | Starbird, Kate | 6' 1" (1.85m) | 153 lb (69kg) | 1975-07-30 | Stanford | R |

Head coach
(United States) Sonny Allen (Marshall)
Assistant coaches
(United States) Maura McHugh
(United States) Linda Burgess

Legend

- (C) Team captain
- (DP) Unsigned draft pick
- (FA) Free agent
- (S) Suspended
- Injured

== Schedule ==
=== Regular season ===
1999 game log
Total: 19–13 (Home: 11–5; Road: 8–8)
June: 6–3 (Home: 4–1; Road: 2–2)

| Game | Date | Team | Score | High points | High rebounds | High assists | Location Attendance | Record |
|---|---|---|---|---|---|---|---|---|
| 1 | June 10 | @ Los Angeles | L 78–100 | Latasha Byears (19) | Ticha Penicheiro (10) | Ticha Penicheiro (6) | Great Western Forum | 0–1 |
| 2 | June 12 | Phoenix | W 96–85 | Yolanda Griffith (31) | Yolanda Griffith (9) | Ticha Penicheiro (6) | ARCO Arena | 1–1 |
| 3 | June 14 | @ Phoenix | W 74–64 | Bolton; Holland-Corn (10) | Yolanda Griffith (18) | Ticha Penicheiro (7) | America West Arena | 2–1 |
| 4 | June 17 | Cleveland | W 70–50 | Kedra Holland-Corn (16) | Yolanda Griffith (19) | Ticha Penicheiro (7) | ARCO Arena | 3–1 |
| 5 | June 19 | @ Utah | L 75–85 | Yolanda Griffith (28) | Yolanda Griffith (19) | Ticha Penicheiro (6) | Delta Center | 3–2 |
| 6 | June 22 | Minnesota | W 79–62 | Kedra Holland-Corn (15) | Yolanda Griffith (9) | Ticha Penicheiro (14) | ARCO Arena | 4–2 |
| 7 | June 24 | Utah | W 107–69 | Ruthie Bolton (27) | Yolanda Griffith (14) | Ticha Penicheiro (10) | ARCO Arena | 5–2 |
| 8 | June 26 | Los Angeles | L 73–76 | Yolanda Griffith (25) | Yolanda Griffith (15) | Ticha Penicheiro (9) | ARCO Arena | 5–3 |
| 9 | June 29 | @ Minnesota | W 86–72 | Yolanda Griffith (30) | Yolanda Griffith (13) | Ticha Penicheiro (13) | Target Center | 6–3 |

July: 8–6 (Home: 3–2; Road: 5–4)

| Game | Date | Team | Score | High points | High rebounds | High assists | Location Attendance | Record |
|---|---|---|---|---|---|---|---|---|
| 10 | July 2 | @ Washington | W 79–74 | Ruthie Bolton (34) | Yolanda Griffith (11) | Ruthie Bolton (7) | MCI Center | 7–3 |
| 11 | July 4 | @ Detroit | W 92–78 | Yolanda Griffith (21) | Yolanda Griffith (10) | Ticha Penicheiro (6) | The Palace of Auburn Hills | 8–3 |
| 12 | July 5 | @ New York | L 63–76 | Yolanda Griffith (23) | Byears; Griffith (8) | Ticha Penicheiro (7) | Madison Square Garden | 8–4 |
| 13 | July 8 | Houston | W 74–63 | Ruthie Bolton (20) | Yolanda Griffith (13) | Ticha Penicheiro (6) | ARCO Arena | 9–4 |
| 14 | July 9 | @ Los Angeles | W 77–72 | Yolanda Griffith (24) | Yolanda Griffith (11) | Ticha Penicheiro (8) | Great Western Forum | 10–4 |
| 15 | July 11 | @ Houston | L 63–68 | Ruthie Bolton (20) | Yolanda Griffith (11) | Ticha Penicheiro (4) | Compaq Center | 10–5 |
| 16 | July 16 | @ Cleveland | W 85–71 | Yolanda Griffith (22) | Yolanda Griffith (13) | Ticha Penicheiro (9) | Gund Arena | 11–5 |
| 17 | July 17 | @ Orlando | W 76–70 | Yolanda Griffith (20) | Yolanda Griffith (9) | Ticha Penicheiro (5) | TD Waterhouse Centre | 12–5 |
| 18 | July 19 | @ Minnesota | L 69–76 | Yolanda Griffith (22) | Yolanda Griffith (6) | Bolton; Penicheiro (4) | ARCO Arena | 12–6 |
| 19 | July 22 | New York | W 71–55 | Yolanda Griffith (29) | Yolanda Griffith (19) | Ticha Penicheiro (5) | ARCO Arena | 13–6 |
| 20 | July 24 | Orlando | L 64–73 | Yolanda Griffith (18) | Yolanda Griffith (11) | Ticha Penicheiro (9) | ARCO Arena | 13–7 |
| 21 | July 27 | Minnesota | L 59–61 | Ticha Penicheiro (27) | Yolanda Griffith (7) | Ticha Penicheiro (6) | ARCO Arena | 13–8 |
| 22 | July 29 | Washington | W 70–54 | Yolanda Griffith (19) | Yolanda Griffith (9) | Ticha Penicheiro (5) | ARCO Arena | 14–8 |
| 23 | July 31 | @ Utah | L 59–63 | Yolanda Griffith (20) | Yolanda Griffith (13) | Ticha Penicheiro (4) | Delta Center | 14–9 |

August: 5–4 (Home: 4–2; Road: 1–2)

| Game | Date | Team | Score | High points | High rebounds | High assists | Location Attendance | Record |
|---|---|---|---|---|---|---|---|---|
| 24 | August 2 | @ Houston | L 70–75 | Ruthie Bolton (16) | Yolanda Griffith (10) | Ticha Penicheiro (13) | Compaq Center | 14–10 |
| 25 | August 4 | @ Charlotte | W 68–62 | Yolanda Griffith (21) | Yolanda Griffith (11) | Ticha Penicheiro (4) | Charlotte Coliseum | 15–10 |
| 26 | August 6 | Detroit | W 71–58 | Holland-Corn; Penicheiro (15) | Griffith; Penicheiro (9) | Ticha Penicheiro (6) | ARCO Arena | 16–10 |
| 27 | August 7 | Phoenix | W 71–60 | Kedra Holland-Corn (21) | Yolanda Griffith (13) | Ticha Penicheiro (10) | ARCO Arena | 17–10 |
| 28 | August 10 | Los Angeles | W 82–80 | Yolanda Griffith (23) | Yolanda Griffith (5) | Lady Hardmon (4) | ARCO Arena | 18–10 |
| 29 | August 13 | Charlotte | W 78–64 | Ruthie Bolton (25) | Bolton; Byears; Smith (7) | Ticha Penicheiro (7) | ARCO Arena | 19–10 |
| 30 | August 14 | Utah | L 89–97 | Tangela Smith (28) | Tangela Smith (9) | Ticha Penicheiro (10) | ARCO Arena | 19–11 |
| 31 | August 17 | @ Phoenix | L 59–71 | Tangela Smith (20) | Bolton; Smith (8) | Ticha Penicheiro (6) | America West Arena | 19–12 |
| 32 | August 21 | Houston | L 65–74 | Ruthie Bolton (16) | Tangela Smith (10) | Ticha Penicheiro (6) | ARCO Arena | 19–13 |

1999 season schedule

=== Playoffs ===
1999 playoff game log
First round vs. Los Angeles Sparks
Lost Series: 0–1

| Game | Date | Team | Score | High points | High rebounds | High assists | Location Attendance | Record |
|---|---|---|---|---|---|---|---|---|
| 1 | August 24 | Los Angeles | @ L 58–71 | Ruthie Bolton (15) | Latasha Byears (10) | Ruthie Bolton (4) | Great Western Forum | 0–1 |

1999 playoff schedule

=== Season standings ===
| Western Conference | W | L | PCT | Conf. | GB |
|---|---|---|---|---|---|
| Houston Comets ^{x} | 26 | 6 | .813 | 16–4 | – |
| Los Angeles Sparks ^{x} | 20 | 12 | .625 | 12–8 | 6.0 |
| Sacramento Monarchs ^{x} | 19 | 13 | .594 | 9–11 | 7.0 |
| Phoenix Mercury ^{o} | 15 | 17 | .469 | 7–13 | 11.0 |
| Minnesota Lynx ^{o} | 15 | 17 | .469 | 8–12 | 11.0 |
| Utah Starzz ^{o} | 15 | 17 | .469 | 8–12 | 11.0 |

== Statistics ==
Legend
| GP | Games played | GS | Games started | MPG | Minutes per game | RPG | Rebounds per game |
| APG | Assists per game | SPG | Steals per game | BPG | Blocks per game | PPG | Points per game |
| FG% | Field-goal percentage | 3P% | 3-point field-goal percentage | FT% | Free-throw percentage | TO | Turnovers per game |
| PF | Fouls per game | | Team leader | | League leader |

=== Regular season ===
| Player | GP | GS | MPG | FG% | 3P% | FT% | RPG | APG | SPG | BPG | PPG |
|---|---|---|---|---|---|---|---|---|---|---|---|
| Ticha Penichiero | 32 | 32 | 35.0 | .320 | .158 | .664 | 4.8 | 7.1 | 2.1 | 0.2 | 7.3 |
| Yolanda Griffith | 29 | 29 | 33.8 | .541 | .000 | .617 | 11.3 | 1.6 | 2.5 | 1.9 | 18.8 |
| Kedra Holland-Corn | 32 | 32 | 32.3 | .383 | .341 | .704 | 2.1 | 1.6 | 1.9 | 0.3 | 11.8 |
| Ruthie Bolton | 31 | 30 | 31.3 | .364 | .321 | .798 | 4.3 | 2.4 | 1.0 | 0.0 | 13.6 |
| Latasha Byears | 32 | 32 | 22.0 | .537 | .000 | .565 | 5.3 | 1.0 | 1.1 | 0.2 | 9.2 |
| Tangela Smith | 31 | 3 | 20.4 | .443 | .500 | .653 | 3.8 | 0.5 | 0.8 | 1.2 | 8.3 |
| Lady Hardmon | 32 | 1 | 14.1 | .375 | .000 | .698 | 1.7 | 1.2 | 0.3 | 0.1 | 3.1 |
| Kate Starbird | 24 | 1 | 9.0 | .218 | .133 | .815 | 1.0 | 0.6 | 0.5 | 0.2 | 2.0 |
| Linda Burgess | 27 | 0 | 8.6 | .434 | .000 | .756 | 2.0 | 0.1 | 0.2 | 0.1 | 3.6 |
| Cindy Blodgett | 12 | 0 | 2.8 | .231 | .000 | .556 | 0.1 | 0.1 | 0.1 | 0.0 | 0.9 |
| Heather Burge | 13 | 0 | 2.2 | .429 | N/A | .200 | 0.4 | 0.0 | 0.2 | 0.2 | 0.5 |

^{‡}Waived/Released during the season
^{†}Traded during the season
^{≠}Acquired during the season
