= 2000 Sacramento Monarchs season =

- Head coach: Sonny Allen
- Arena: ARCO Arena

Results
- Record: 21–11 (.656)
- Place: 3rd (Western)
- Playoff finish: Lost First Round (2-0) to Houston Comets

The 2000 WNBA season was the 4th season for the Sacramento Monarchs. The team made the WNBA Playoffs for the second consecutive season, but they were shortly swept by eventual champion Houston Comets in the first round.

== Transactions ==
=== Miami Sol expansion draft ===
The following player was selected in the Miami Sol expansion draft from the Sacramento Monarchs:

Player	Nationality	School/Team/Country
Kate Starbird	United States	Stanford

=== Portland Fire expansion draft ===
The following player was selected in the Portland Fire expansion draft from the Sacramento Monarchs:

Player	Nationality	School/Team/Country
Molly Goodenbour	United States	Portland Power

=== WNBA draft ===
Round	Pick	Player	Nationality	School/Team/Country
1	14	Katy Steding	United States	Portland Power
2	30	Stacy Clinesmith	United States	UC Santa Barbara
3	46	Rhonda Smith	United States	Washington
4	62	Jessica Zinobile	United States	St. Francis (NY)

=== Transactions ===
Date	Transaction
December 15, 1999	Lost Kate Starbird to the Miami Sol in the WNBA expansion draft
December 15, 1999	Lost Molly Goodenbour to the Portland Fire in the WNBA expansion draft
April 25, 2000	Drafted Katy Steding, Stacy Clinesmith, Rhonda Smith and Jessica Zinobile in the 2000 WNBA draft
May 15, 2000	Waived Tara Williams
May 23, 2000	Waived Heather Burge and Jessica Zinobile
July 10, 2000	Waived Rhonda Smith
October 11, 2000	Traded Latasha Byears to the Los Angeles Sparks in exchange for La'Keshia Frett

== Roster ==
2000 Sacramento Monarchs roster
Players
Coaches

Pos.	No.	Nat.	Name	Height	Weight	DOB	From	Yrs
G	5	(United States)	Blodgett, Cindy	5' 9" (1.75m)	130 lb (59kg)	1975-12-13	Maine	2
G	6	(United States)	Bolton, Ruthie	5' 9" (1.75m)	150 lb (68kg)	1967-05-27	Auburn	3
F	42	(United States)	Burgess, Linda	6' 1" (1.85m)	173 lb (78kg)	1969-07-27	Alabama	3
G/F	51	(United States)	Byears, Latasha	5' 11" (1.8m)	206 lb (93kg)	1973-08-12	DePaul	3
G	24	(United States)	Clinesmith, Stacy	5' 5" (1.65m)	125 lb (57kg)	1978-04-22	UC Santa Barbara	R
F/C	33	(United States)	Griffith, Yolanda	6' 4" (1.93m)	175 lb (79kg)	1970-03-01	Florida Atlantic	1
F	27	(United States)	Hardmon, Lady	5' 10" (1.78m)	160 lb (73kg)	1970-09-12	Georgia	3
F	25	(United States)	Holland-Corn, Kedra	5' 8" (1.73m)	129 lb (59kg)	1974-11-02	Georgia	1
G	21	(Portugal)	Penicheiro, Ticha	5' 11" (1.8m)	146 lb (66kg)	1974-09-18	Old Dominion	2
C	40	(United States)	Smith, Rhonda	6' 3" (1.91m)		1973-05-01	Washington	R
C	50	(United States)	Smith, Tangela	6' 3" (1.91m)	158 lb (72kg)	1977-04-01	Iowa	2
F	30	(United States)	Steding, Katy	6' 0" (1.83m)	173 lb (78kg)	1967-12-11	Stanford	R

Head coach
(United States) Sonny Allen (Marshall)
Assistant coaches
(United States) Maura McHugh
(United States) Jim Les
(United States) Steve Shuman
(United States) Al Biancani
(United States) Jill Jackson

Legend

- (C) Team captain
- (DP) Unsigned draft pick
- (FA) Free agent
- (S) Suspended
- Injured

== Schedule ==
=== Regular season ===
2000 game log
Total: 21–11 (Home: 13–3; Road: 8–8)
May: 1–0 (Home: 1–0; Road: 0–0)

Game	Date	Team	Score	High points	High rebounds	High assists	Location Attendance	Record
1	May 31	Seattle	W 76-60	Latasha Byears (17)	Latasha Byears (8)	Ticha Penicheiro (10)	ARCO Arena	1–0

June: 9–5 (Home: 5–0; Road: 4–5)

Game	Date	Team	Score	High points	High rebounds	High assists	Location Attendance	Record
2	June 3	@ Detroit	L 74-77	Yolanda Griffith (24)	Yolanda Griffith (8)	Kedra Holland-Corn (5)	The Palace of Auburn Hills	1–1
3	June 5	@ Orlando	L 68-75	Kedra Holland-Corn (21)	Tangela Smith (12)	Ticha Penicheiro (6)	TD Waterhouse Centre	1–2
4	June 6	@ Houston	L 70-78	Yolanda Griffith (22)	Yolanda Griffith (10)	Ticha Penicheiro (9)	Compaq Center	1–3
5	June 9	@ New York	W 77-56	Yolanda Griffith (24)	Yolanda Griffith (8)	Ticha Penicheiro (9)	Madison Square Garden	2–3
6	June 11	Los Angeles	W 75-68	Kedra Holland-Corn (23)	Yolanda Griffith (8)	Ticha Penicheiro (7)	ARCO Arena	3–3
7	June 15	@ Seattle	W 54-50	Griffith; Holland-Corn (13)	Yolanda Griffith (10)	Ticha Penicheiro (5)	KeyArena	4–3
8	June 17	Charlotte	W 74-63	Tangela Smith (19)	Tangela Smith (9)	Ticha Penicheiro (10)	ARCO Arena	5–3
9	June 19	@ Cleveland	L 70-81	Tangela Smith (19)	Latasha Byears (7)	Ticha Penicheiro (11)	Gund Arena	5–4
10	June 21	@ Indiana	W 70-58	Tangela Smith (19)	Yolanda Griffith (16)	Kedra Holland-Corn (7)	Conseco Fieldhouse	6–4
11	June 23	@ Washington	W 84-69	Tangela Smith (22)	Griffith; Smith (7)	Ticha Penicheiro (12)	MCI Center	7–4
12	June 25	Portland	W 92-76	Kedra Holland-Corn (20)	Yolanda Griffith (5)	Ticha Penicheiro (10)	ARCO Arena	8–4
13	June 26	@ Utah	L 80-89	Ruthie Bolton (25)	Yolanda Griffith (10)	Ticha Penicheiro (13)	Delta Center	8–5
14	June 28	Minnesota	W 82-74	Kedra Holland-Corn (17)	Yolanda Griffith (9)	Stacy Clinesmith (8)	ARCO Arena	9–5
15	June 30	Utah	W 85-62	Ruthie Bolton (19)	Byears; Griffith (8)	Ticha Penicheiro (9)	ARCO Arena	10–5

July: 8–5 (Home: 5–2; Road: 3–3)

Game	Date	Team	Score	High points	High rebounds	High assists	Location Attendance	Record
16	July 1	Detroit	W 108-96	Holland-Corn; T. Smith (19)	Yolanda Griffith (11)	Ticha Penicheiro (14)	ARCO Arena	11–5
17	July 5	Los Angeles	L 61-76	Yolanda Griffith (19)	Yolanda Griffith (9)	Ticha Penicheiro (5)	ARCO Arena	11–6
18	July 7	@ Portland	W 63-60	Ruthie Bolton (28)	Yolanda Griffith (7)	Ticha Penicheiro (6)	Rose Garden	12–6
19	July 8	Washington	W 78-56	Bolton; Griffith (14)	Yolanda Griffith (13)	Ticha Penicheiro (8)	ARCO Arena	13–6
20	July 12	@ Houston	L 62-77	Yolanda Griffith (22)	Yolanda Griffith (9)	Ticha Penicheiro (8)	Compaq Center	13–7
21	July 13	@ Phoenix	L 64-72	Kedra Holland-Corn (19)	Yolanda Griffith (16)	Byears; Griffith; Holland-Corn (3)	America West Arena	13–8
22	July 15	Utah	L 69-75	Yolanda Griffith (29)	Yolanda Griffith (17)	Ticha Penicheiro (11)	ARCO Arena	13–9
23	July 20	Minnesota	W 73-56	Ruthie Bolton (23)	Tangela Smith (11)	Kedra Holland-Corn (5)	ARCO Arena	14–9
24	July 22	Phoenix	W 61-60	Yolanda Griffith (21)	Yolanda Griffith (17)	Tangela Smith (4)	ARCO Arena	15–9
25	July 23	@ Los Angeles	L 68-73	Yolanda Griffith (19)	Ruthie Bolton (7)	Kedra Holland-Corn (4)	Great Western Forum	15–10
26	July 26	@ Portland	W 73-70	Tangela Smith (20)	Yolanda Griffith (14)	Ticha Penicheiro (9)	Rose Garden	16–10
27	July 27	Orlando	W 73-66	Ruthie Bolton (24)	Yolanda Griffith (11)	Ticha Penicheiro (13)	ARCO Arena	17–10
28	July 30	@ Phoenix	W 70-63	Yolanda Griffith (16)	Yolanda Griffith (14)	Ticha Penicheiro (11)	America West Arena	18–10

August: 3–1 (Home: 2–1; Road: 1–0)

Game	Date	Team	Score	High points	High rebounds	High assists	Location Attendance	Record
29	August 2	Miami	W 73-55	Ticha Penicheiro (15)	Tangela Smith (8)	Stacy Clinesmith (4)	ARCO Arena	19–10
30	August 4	@ Minnesota	W 74-68	Yolanda Griffith (24)	Yolanda Griffith (17)	Ticha Penicheiro (10)	Target Center	20–10
31	August 6	Houston	L 63-78	Yolanda Griffith (30)	Yolanda Griffith (19)	Ticha Penicheiro (7)	ARCO Arena	20–11
32	August 9	Seattle	W 79-46	Ruthie Bolton (17)	Yolanda Griffith (12)	Ticha Penicheiro (6)	ARCO Arena	21–11

=== Playoffs ===
2000 playoff game log
First round vs. Houston Comets
Lost Series: 0–2

Game	Date	Team	Score	High points	High rebounds	High assists	Location Attendance	Record
1	August 12	Houston	L 64–72	Ruthie Bolton (16)	Yolanda Griffith (14)	Kedra Holland-Corn (5)	ARCO Arena	0–1
2	August 14	@ Houston	L 70–75	Ruthie Bolton (23)	Yolanda Griffith (10)	Ticha Penicheiro (10)	Compaq Center	0–2

2000 playoff schedule

=== Season standings ===
Western Conference	W	L	PCT	Conf.	GB
Los Angeles Sparks ^{x}	28	4	.875	17–4	–
Houston Comets ^{x}	27	5	.844	17–4	1.0
Sacramento Monarchs ^{x}	21	11	.656	13–8	7.0
Phoenix Mercury ^{x}	20	12	.625	11–10	8.0
Utah Starzz ^{o}	18	14	.563	13–8	10.0
Minnesota Lynx ^{o}	15	17	.469	5–16	13.0
Portland Fire ^{o}	10	22	.313	4–17	18.0
Seattle Storm ^{o}	6	26	.188	4–17	22.0

== Statistics ==
Legend
GP	Games played	GS	Games started	MPG	Minutes per game	RPG	Rebounds per game
APG	Assists per game	SPG	Steals per game	BPG	Blocks per game	PPG	Points per game
FG%	Field-goal percentage	3P%	3-point field-goal percentage	FT%	Free-throw percentage	TO	Turnovers per game
PF	Fouls per game		Team leader		League leader

=== Regular season ===
Player	GP	GS	MPG	FG%	3P%	FT%	RPG	APG	SPG	BPG	PPG
Yolanda Griffith	32	32	32.1	.535	N/A	.706	10.3	1.5	2.6	1.9	16.3
Ticha Penichiero	30	30	31.2	.368	.200	.579	3.0	7.9	2.3	0.2	6.9
Ruthie Bolton	29	29	29.9	.361	.313	.762	3.7	2.0	1.2	0.0	13.1
Kedra Holland-Corn	32	32	29.2	.439	.361	.697	2.2	2.5	1.3	0.2	9.8
Tangela Smith	32	32	28.9	.474	N/A	.783	5.6	1.3	0.9	2.0	12.1
Latasha Byears	32	0	16.3	.524	.500	.612	3.8	0.7	0.9	0.2	5.7
Lady Hardmon	30	3	13.4	.443	.000	.754	1.5	0.4	0.3	0.1	4.1
Stacy Clinesmith	26	2	11.0	.351	.293	.824	1.2	1.9	0.5	0.0	2.5
Katy Steding	29	0	10.7	.379	.321	.286	1.3	0.5	0.4	0.3	3.1
Linda Burgess	5	0	8.2	.200	N/A	.667	3.4	0.4	0.2	0.0	2.4
Cindy Blodgett	20	0	6.7	.400	.286	.667	0.5	0.2	0.4	0.1	2.6
Rhonda Smith	9	0	2.3	.286	.000	.500	0.3	0.1	0.2	0.0	0.7

^{‡}Waived/Released during the season
^{†}Traded during the season
^{≠}Acquired during the season
