= Rhonda Banchero =

American basketball player

Rhonda Smith-Banchero
Personal information
- Born: May 1, 1973 (age 53) Seattle, Washington, U.S.
- Listed height: 6 ft 3 in (1.91 m)
- Listed weight: 185 lb (84 kg)

Career information
- High school: Franklin (Seattle, Washington)
- College: Washington (1991–1995)
- WNBA draft: 2000: 3rd round, 46th overall pick
- Drafted by: Sacramento Monarchs
- Playing career: 1995–2001
- Position: Center

Career history
- 1996–1998: Seattle Reign
- 1998: Portland Power
- 2000: Sacramento Monarchs

Career highlights
- 3x All Pac-10 (1993–1995)
- Stats at Basketball Reference

Rhonda Smith-Banchero (née Smith; born May 1, 1973) is an American former basketball player. She played college basketball for the Washington Huskies where she graduated as the school's all-time leading scorer and was inducted to the Husky Hall of Fame in 2004. She went on to play professionally for several seasons, including for the Sacramento Monarchs in the WNBA.

== Amateur career ==
Smith-Banchero attended Franklin High School in Seattle. She led the school's basketball team to the semifinals of the state playoffs in 1988 and 1989. She holds the record for most rebounds in a Washington state playoff game. Her senior season, she was named state high school girls' basketball player of the year by the Seattle Times and Gatorade.

Smith-Banchero then attended the University of Washington. She became familiar with her hometown team and coach Chris Gobrecht after her older sister became the team's manager. Smith-Banchero set the school's all-time scoring record, which was later broken by Jamie Redd. In her final three seasons, Smith-Banchero topped the Huskies in points and rebounds and led to the NCAA tournament, winning at least one home game each tournament appearance. Her senior year, she was named an All-American by Basketball America.

== Professional career ==
After college, Smith played professional basketball in Taiwan before joining the Seattle Reign of the American Basketball League. She later played for the Portland Power in the defunct women's league, then played in Israel in 1999 before being drafted by the Sacramento Monarchs in the third round of the 2000 WNBA draft. She played nine games in the 2000 WNBA season.

== Career statistics ==
Legend
GP	Games played	GS	Games started	MPG	Minutes per game	RPG	Rebounds per game
APG	Assists per game	SPG	Steals per game	BPG	Blocks per game	PPG	Points per game
TO	Turnovers per game	FG%	Field-goal percentage	3P%	3-point field-goal percentage	FT%	Free-throw percentage
**Bold**	Career best	°	League leader

== WNBA career statistics ==
=== Regular season ===
Year	Team	GP	GS	MPG	FG%	3P%	FT%	RPG	APG	SPG	BPG	TO	PPG
2000	Sacramento	9	0	2.3	28.6	0.0	50.0	0.3	0.1	0.0	0.0	0.2	0.7
Career	1 year, 1 team	9	0	2.3	28.6	0.0	50.0	0.3	0.1	0.0	0.0	0.2	0.7

=== College ===
Year	Team	GP	GS	MPG	FG%	3P%	FT%	RPG	APG	SPG	BPG	TO	PPG
1991–92	Washington	27	-	-	47.4	0.0	55.7	4.0	0.2	0.8	0.2	-	7.5
1992–93	Washington	27	-	-	**56.3**	0.0	57.1	6.9	0.3	1.3	**0.4**	-	17.9
1993–94	Washington	29	-	-	54.7	0.0	56.9	7.8	0.7	1.5	0.2	-	**18.4**
1994–95	Washington	**33**	-	-	51.4	**40.0**	**65.9**	**8.5**	**1.0**	1.5	0.3	-	17.7
**Career**		116	-	-	53.0	33.3	59.7	6.9	0.6	1.3	0.3	-	15.5
Statistics retrieved from Sports-Reference.

== Post-playing career ==
After her playing career ended, Smith-Banchero worked as a software-licensing consultant for Microsoft. In basketball, she has coached the girls basketball team at Holy Names Academy and was a color commentator for UW women's basketball broadcasts. As of 2025, she is the director of organizational equity and inclusion at Downtown Emergency Service Center in Seattle.

== Personal life ==
Smith-Banchero grew up in the Mount Baker neighborhood of Seattle, where she still lives.

Smith-Banchero met her future husband, Mario Banchero, at the University of Washington, when she played on the basketball team and he was a walk-on on the football team. He is the co-owner of a family butcher and meat distributor business.

Smith-Banchero is the mother of NBA All-Star Paolo Banchero. Smith-Banchero helped her son file a lawsuit in 2019 against the King County Sheriff’s Office after an officer pointed a gun at a friend of his during a traffic stop after a concert in 2018. Paolo Banchero was in the passenger seat of the vehicle during the interaction. The sheriff's office apologized to the two African American high-school students and implemented new use-of-force guidelines to be used when its officers approach motorists. Paolo Banchero received $20,000 from the lawsuit.

Smith-Banchero has two younger children who are also athletes. Mia Banchero is a college soccer player at Queens University of Charlotte. Giulio Banchero plays football at O'Dea High School.
