= Stacy Clinesmith =

American basketball player and coach (born 1978)

Gonzaga Bulldogs
- Title: Assistant coach
- League: West Coast Conference

Personal information
- Born: April 22, 1978 (age 48) Spokane, Washington, U.S.
- Listed height: 5 ft 5 in (1.65 m)
- Listed weight: 148 lb (67 kg)

Career information
- High school: Mead (Spokane, Washington)
- College: UC Santa Barbara (1996–2000)
- WNBA draft: 2000: 2nd round, 30th overall pick
- Drafted by: Sacramento Monarchs
- Playing career: 2000–2002
- Position: Point guard / shooting guard
- Number: 24, 21
- Coaching career: 2008–present

Career history

Playing
- 2000–2001: Sacramento Monarchs
- 2002: Detroit Shock

Coaching
- 2008–2009: Oregon State (DBO)
- 2010–2011: Central Washington (assistant)
- 2011–2014: Santa Clara (assistant)
- 2014–present: Gonzaga (assistant)

Career highlights
- 3x First-team All-Big West (1998–2000); Big West All-Freshman Team (1997); Washington High School Player of the Year (1996); 2x USA Today All-American
- Stats at Basketball Reference

Stacy Marie Clinesmith (born April 22, 1978 in Spokane, Washington) is a former professional basketball player in the WNBA and current college assistant coach for Gonzaga University.

== College ==
Clinesmith attended University of California, Santa Barbara and played basketball for four seasons there. She helped the team win four Big West Conference women's basketball tournaments and won the Big West Tournament Most Valuable Player in 2000. She graduated with a Bachelor of Arts degree in sociology.

== Career statistics ==
Legend
GP	Games played	GS	Games started	MPG	Minutes per game	RPG	Rebounds per game
APG	Assists per game	SPG	Steals per game	BPG	Blocks per game	PPG	Points per game
TO	Turnovers per game	FG%	Field-goal percentage	3P%	3-point field-goal percentage	FT%	Free-throw percentage
**Bold**	Career best	°	League leader

=== WNBA ===
==== Regular season ====
Year	Team	GP	GS	MPG	FG%	3P%	FT%	RPG	APG	SPG	BPG	TO	PPG
2000	Sacramento	**26**	**2**	**11.0**	35.1	29.3	82.4	**1.2**	**1.9**	**0.5**	0.0	1.0	**2.5**
2001	Sacramento	16	0	4.7	28.6	20.0	0.0	0.2	0.9	0.1	0.0	**0.4**	0.6
2002	Detroit	12	0	8.8	**38.1**	**40.0**	**83.3**	0.4	1.4	0.1	**0.1**	0.5	2.3
Career	3 years, 2 teams	54	2	8.6	34.8	30.3	82.6	0.7	1.5	0.3	0.0	0.7	1.9

==== Playoffs ====
Year	Team	GP	GS	MPG	FG%	3P%	FT%	RPG	APG	SPG	BPG	TO	PPG
2000	Sacramento	2	0	1.5	100.0	100.0	0.0	0.0	0.0	0.0	0.0	0.0	1.5
Career	1 year, 1 team	2	0	1.5	100.0	100.0	0.0	0.0	0.0	0.0	0.0	0.0	1.5

=== College ===
Ratios
Year	Team	GP	FG%	3P%	FT%	RBG	APG	BPG	SPG	PPG
1996–97	UC Santa Barbara	30	**44.2%**	**41.3%**	60.3%	3.40	4.53	0.00	**1.77**	10.70
1997–98	UC Santa Barbara	33	40.3%	40.6%	77.5%	**3.42**	4.39	**0.18**	1.67	**13.97**
1998–99	UC Santa Barbara	30	44.1%	36.7%	**81.5%**	2.80	5.67	0.10	1.57	11.50
1999-00	UC Santa Barbara	**34**	44.2%	40.5%	80.4%	2.53	**5.77**	0.09	1.44	12.88
Career		127	43.0%	39.9%	75.9%	3.02	5.09	0.09	1.61	12.32

Totals
Year	Team	GP	FG	FGA	3P	3PA	FT	FTA	REB	A	BK	ST	PTS
1996–97	UC Santa Barbara	30	111	251	52	126	47	78	102	136	0	53	321
1997–98	UC Santa Barbara	33	**147**	**365**	**67**	**165**	**100**	**129**	**113**	145	**6**	**55**	**461**
1998–99	UC Santa Barbara	30	113	256	44	120	75	92	83	170	3	47	345
1999-00	UC Santa Barbara	**34**	144	326	64	158	86	107	86	**196**	3	49	438
Career		127	515	1198	227	569	308	406	384	647	12	204	1565

== WNBA career ==
Clinesmith was picked in the second round, 30th overall by the Sacramento Monarchs in the 2000 WNBA Draft. Clinesmith only appeared in 56 career WNBA games for both the Monarchs and Detroit Shock.

== After WNBA ==
After leaving the WNBA, Clinesmith was Director of Sports, USA in 2004, which she oversaw all of basketball operations in Spokane, Washington. From 2005–2007, Clinesmith was Director of the Sports Performance Extreme Enhancement Development (SPEED) program at Whitworth Physical Therapy in Spokane. She was also the owner and manager of Clinesmith Basketball, where she developed, organized and instructed basketball camps for Spokane area middle and high school girls basketball players.

== Coaching career ==
Clinesmith received her first coaching job as Director of Basketball Operations for the Oregon State Beavers women's basketball program during the 2008–2009 season. Clinesmith received her first assistant coaching job at Central Washington Wildcats women's basketball program during the 2010–2011 season. Clinesmith was promoted to interim head coach for the CWU Wildcats in March 2011, but she left to become assistant coach for the Santa Clara Broncos in June of that year. Clinesmith remained as assistant coach for the Broncos until the end of the 2013–2014 season. In May 2014, Clinesmith was hired as an assistant coach for the Gonzaga Bulldogs women's basketball program.

== Hall of Fame ==
Clinesmith was inducted into the Inland Northwest Sports Hall of Fame at the Spokane Arena in October 2024.

== Personal life ==
Clinesmith has/had hobbies in other sports, such as mountain biking and wakeboarding.
