= Cindy Blodgett =

American basketball player and coach (born 1975)

Personal information
- Born: December 23, 1975 (age 50) Clinton, Maine, U.S.
- Listed height: 5 ft 9 in (1.75 m)
- Listed weight: 130 lb (59 kg)

Career information
- High school: Lawrence (Fairfield, Maine)
- College: Maine (1994–1998)
- WNBA draft: 1998: 1st round, 6th overall pick
- Drafted by: Cleveland Rockers
- Playing career: 1998–2001
- Position: Guard
- Number: 14

Career history
- 1998: Cleveland Rockers
- 1999–2001: Sacramento Monarchs

Career highlights
- Third-team All-American – AP (1998); 2× First-team All-AEC (1997, 1998); 4× AEC Tournament MOP (1995–1998); AEC Player of the Year (1997); NAC Player of the Year (1996); NAC Rookie of the Year (1995); 2× First-team All-NAC (1995, 1996); AEC All-Freshman Team (1995); NCAA season scoring leader (1996); GTE Academic All-America Award; Dean Smith Award; 3× Maine Gatorade Player of the Year (1992–1994); Miss Maine Basketball (1994); Portland Press Herald Athlete of the Year; Bangor Daily News Owen Osborne Award
- Stats at Basketball Reference

Cindy Lee Blodgett (born December 23, 1975) is an American former collegiate and professional basketball player. She was also the head coach at University of Maine from 2007 to 2011. Blodgett attended Lawrence High School in Fairfield, Maine, where she was an all-star basketball player. She led the Bulldogs to a four-year career record of 84–4. Throughout that four-year period they won four state class A championships. Her tremendous accolades have made her a hero across the state of Maine.

== Playing career ==
Blodgett was a standout player for the women's basketball team at the University of Maine from 1994 to 1998. A four-time Kodak All-American, Blodgett became just the second woman in NCAA Division I history to lead the nation in scoring four consecutive seasons, averaging over 27 points per game in her sophomore and junior years at Maine. She finished her career with 3,005 points, breaking a total of 20 school records. Blodgett led Maine to its first four appearances in the NCAA basketball tournament in the school's history.

Blodgett earned a Bachelor of Science degree in elementary education from the University of Maine, graduating cum laude.

After graduation, she was selected by the Cleveland Rockers of the WNBA in the first round (#6 overall pick) of the 1998 WNBA draft.

After spending one season with the Rockers, Blodgett was traded to the Sacramento Monarchs, and spent three seasons with them after which she was released.

Blodgett also played for the Springfield Spirit in the National Women's Basketball League.

== Career statistics ==
Legend
GP	Games played	GS	Games started	MPG	Minutes per game	RPG	Rebounds per game
APG	Assists per game	SPG	Steals per game	BPG	Blocks per game	PPG	Points per game
TO	Turnovers per game	FG%	Field-goal percentage	3P%	3-point field-goal percentage	FT%	Free-throw percentage
**Bold**	Career best	°	League leader

=== WNBA career statistics ===
==== Regular season ====
Year	Team	GP	GS	MPG	FG%	3P%	FT%	RPG	APG	SPG	BPG	TO	PPG
1998	Cleveland	**22**	0	**8.4**	28.8	27.0	62.5	0.6	**0.8**	0.4	0.0	0.5	2.9
1999	Sacramento	12	0	2.8	23.1	0.0	55.6	0.1	0.1	0.1	0.0	**0.4**	0.9
2000	Sacramento	20	0	6.7	40.0	28.6	**66.7**	0.5	0.2	0.4	**0.1**	0.7	2.6
2001	Sacramento	11	0	6.5	**44.8**	**53.3**	0.0	**0.8**	0.5	**0.5**	**0.1**	1.0	**3.1**
Career	4 years, 2 teams	65	0	6.5	34.8	29.9	61.5	0.5	0.4	0.4	0.0	0.6	2.5

==== Playoffs ====
Year	Team	GP	GS	MPG	FG%	3P%	FT%	RPG	APG	SPG	BPG	TO	PPG
1999	Sacramento	1	0	**6.0**	**100.0**	**100.0**	0.0	1.0	**1.0**	**2.0**	**2.0**	2.0	3.0
2001	Sacramento	**2**	0	3.5	50.0	50.0	**50.0**	1.0	0.5	0.0	0.0	**0.5**	3.0
Career	1 year, 3 teams	3	0	4.3	60.0	66.7	50.0	1.0	0.7	0.7	0.7	1.0	3.0

=== College career statistics ===
Legend
GP	Games played	GS	Games started	MPG	Minutes per game	FG%	Field goal percentage	3P%	3-point field goal percentage
FT%	Free throw percentage	RPG	Rebounds per game	APG	Assists per game	SPG	Steals per game	BPG	Blocks per game
TO	Turnovers per game	PPG	Points per game	**Bold**	Career high		Data not available	*	Led Division I

Year	Team	GP	Points	FG%	3P%	FT%	RPG	APG	SPG	BPG	PPG
1995	Maine	30	602	46.0%	33.6%	73.4%	5.3	3.8	**3.3**	0.3	20.1
1996	Maine	**32**	**889**	**50.5%**	36.5%	83.2%	5.3	**4.5**	2.7	**0.4**	***27.8**
1997	Maine	30	810	49.5%	**36.9%**	82.6%	**5.8**	3.9	3.0	0.2	27.0°
1998	Maine	26	704	46.7%	34.0%	**87.6%**	4.8	4.4	2.2	0.2	27.1°
Career		118	3005	48.4%	35.3%	82.2%	5.3	4.1	2.8	0.3	25.5

== Coaching career ==
Blodgett began her coaching career by serving as an assistant coach to the women's basketball team at Boston University during the 1999–2000 season. In 2003–04, she ran a summer skills basketball camp in her native Maine. On September 30, 2005, Blodgett became an assistant coach at Brown University.

On June 28, 2005, her hometown of Clinton, Maine dedicated a public park in her honor.

On May 23, 2007, The University of Maine named her the new women's head basketball coach. She signed a four-year contract with her alma mater.

On September 21, 2010, Blodgett signed a two-year extension with the school that paid her $109,772 annually through the 2012–13 season. Her teams had compiled a 20–69 record over the first three years of her original contract.

On March 29, 2011, following a 4–25 season, Blodgett was released from her position as head coach.

After leaving the University of Maine, Blodgett spent three seasons as an assistant coach at the University of Rhode Island.

In 2014, she was hired by her former Sacramento Monarchs teammate, Kady Steding, to return as an assistant coach to Boston University.

Blodgett is currently the Physical Education Department Head at Lincoln School, a private girls school located in Providence, RI. Beginning with the 2019–2020 season, she will serve as the girls basketball coach.

== See also ==
- List of NCAA Division I women's basketball players with 3000 points
