= Clinesmith =

Clinesmith is a surname. Notable people with the surname include:

- Kevin Clinesmith (born 1984), former FBI lawyer convicted in Crossfire Hurricane investigation
- Stacy Clinesmith (born 1978), American basketball player and coach
