= Holyfield =

Holyfield may refer to:

- Holyfield, Essex, a hamlet in Waltham Abbey parish, England
- Holyfield (surname), a surname (including a list of people with the name)

== See also ==
- Hollyfield (disambiguation)
