= Kedra Holland-Corn =

American basketball player (born 1974)

Personal information
- Born: November 2, 1974 (age 52) Houston, Texas, U.S.
- Listed height: 5 ft 8 in (1.73 m)

Career information
- College: Georgia (1993–1997)
- WNBA draft: 1999: 2nd round, 14th overall pick
- Drafted by: Sacramento Monarchs
- Position: Guard

Career history
- 1999–2002: Sacramento Monarchs
- 2003: Detroit Shock
- 2004: Houston Comets
- 2006: Detroit Shock

Career highlights
- 2× WNBA Champion (2003, 2006); Third-team All-American – AP (1997); First-team All-SEC (1997)
- Stats at Basketball Reference
Medals
World University Games
Gold medal – first place	1997 Marsala	Team competition

Kedra Holland-Corn (born November 5, 1974) is an American professional women's basketball player with the Detroit Shock of the Women's National Basketball Association (WNBA). After attending the University of Georgia, she played for the Sacramento Monarchs and Houston Comets.

She also played in Hungary and Italy. In Italy, with La Spezia team, won the Italian league's MVP title in the 2005–06 season. In the next season Holland-Corn will play again in Italy with Phard Napoli.

== History ==
Professional Experience:

2019 –

- Coach Girls' Basketball

2013 – 2017

- Personal Fitness Trainer - At Aramco

2006 – 2008

- Professional Basketball Player in Napoli Italy

Summer 2007

- Coach for NBC Basketball Camp Italy

Fall/winter 2005 – 2006

- Professional Basketball Player in La Spezia Italy

Fall/winter 2004 – 2005

- Professional Basketball Player in Budapest Hungary

Summer 2004

- Professional Basketball Player for the WNBA's Houston Comets

Fall/winter 2003 – 2004

- Professional Basketball Player in Valencia Spain

Summer 2003

- Professional Basketball Player for the WNBA's Detroit Shock

All summers 1999 – 2002

- Professional Basketball Player for the WNBA's Sacramento Monarchs

Fall/winter 2002 – 2003

- Professional Basketball Player in Spain for Barcelona Club Team

Fall/winter 2001 – 2002

- Professional Basketball Player in France for Aix-en-Provence Club Team

Fall/winter 2000 – 2001

- Professional Basketball Player in Spain for Lugo Club Team

Fall/winter 1999 – 2000

- Professional Basketball Player in Italy for Faenza Club Team

Fall/winter - 1997 – 1998

- ABL San Jose Lasers - American Basketball League
- WNBA Champions (Detroit Shock) (2003)
- Spanish League Champion in Barcelona Spain (2003)
- Spanish League Champion in Valencia Spain (2004)
- WNBA Champions (Detroit Shock) (2006)
- Italian League Champion in Napoli Italy (2006)
- Euroleague All-Star (2008)
- Italian league player of the year (200

== Career statistics ==
Legend
GP	Games played	GS	Games started	MPG	Minutes per game	RPG	Rebounds per game
APG	Assists per game	SPG	Steals per game	BPG	Blocks per game	PPG	Points per game
TO	Turnovers per game	FG%	Field-goal percentage	3P%	3-point field-goal percentage	FT%	Free-throw percentage
**Bold**	Career best	°	League leader

=== WNBA ===
==== Regular season ====
Year	Team	GP	GS	MPG	FG%	3P%	FT%	RPG	APG	SPG	BPG	TO	PPG
1999	Sacramento	32	**32**	**32.3**	38.3	34.1	70.4	2.1	1.6	**1.9**	**0.3**	2.3	**11.8**
2000	Sacramento	32	**32**	29.2	43.9	36.1	69.7	2.2	**2.5**	1.3	0.2	2.3	9.8
2001	Sacramento	32	**32**	27.3	44.2	39.3	68.3	2.3	2.2	1.8	0.2	2.1	10.1
2002	Sacramento	32	**32**	28.2	34.1	24.2	75.0	**2.8**	2.0	1.3	0.2	2.5	9.3
2003	Detroit	**34**	2	20.4	**46.1**	**40.3**	**76.2**	1.7	1.9	1.1	0.1	1.7	9.2
2004	Houston	27	21	26.0	37.1	32.0	68.3	2.4	2.0	1.5	0.1	1.7	6.6
2005	Did not play (did not appear in WNBA)												
2006	Detroit	**34**	0	11.8	35.9	33.3	62.5	1.2	1.3	0.7	0.1	**1.2**	4.1
Career	7 years, 3 teams	223	151	24.9	40.1	34.1	71.1	2.1	1.9	1.3	0.1	2.0	8.7

==== Playoffs ====
Year	Team	GP	GS	MPG	FG%	3P%	FT%	RPG	APG	SPG	BPG	TO	PPG
1999	Sacramento	1	1	21.0	20.0	0.0	0.0	**5.0**	1.0	**2.0**	0.0	4.0	2.0
2000	Sacramento	2	2	30.0	43.8	33.3	**100.0**	4.0	**3.0**	1.5	0.0	**0.5**	9.5
2001	Sacramento	5	**5**	**32.0**	**43.8**	**48.1**	87.5	3.6	1.4	1.6	**0.4**	1.4	**13.8**
2003	Detroit	**8**	0	19.4	39.6	46.9	80.0	1.5	1.9	1.3	0.0	1.5	8.1
2006	Detroit	**8**	0	4.1	0.0	0.0	0.0	0.4	0.6	0.1	0.0	**0.5**	0.0
Career	5 years, 2 teams	24	8	17.9	38.5	41.3	85.7	1.9	1.4	1.0	0.1	1.2	6.5

=== College ===
Legend
GP	Games played	GS	Games started	MPG	Minutes per game
FG%	Field goal percentage	3P%	3-point field goal percentage	FT%	Free throw percentage
RPG	Rebounds per game	APG	Assists per game	SPG	Steals per game
BPG	Blocks per game	PPG	Points per game	**Bold**	Career high

Year	Team	GP	Points	FG%	FT%	RPG	APG	SPG	BPG	PPG
94	Georgia	28	246	40.4%	71.8%	2.5	1.2	1.4	0.1	8.8
95	Georgia	**33**	413	41.2%	69.0%	3.9	1.8	2.4	**0.3**	12.5
96	Georgia	**33**	373	45.7%	76.6%	3.3	2.6	2.1	0.2	11.3
97	Georgia	31	**534**	**46.9%**	**76.9%**	**4.0**	**3.8**	**3.7**	0.1	**17.2**
Career		125	1566	43.8%	74.2%	3.4	2.4	2.4	0.2	12.5

== USA Basketball ==
Holland-Corn represented the US at the 1997 World University Games held in Marsala, Sicily, Italy in August 1997. The USA team won all six games, earning the gold medal at the event. Holland-Corn went on to average 10.3 points per game, and led her team with 15 steals.
