= Sonny Allen =

American basketball coach (1936–2020)

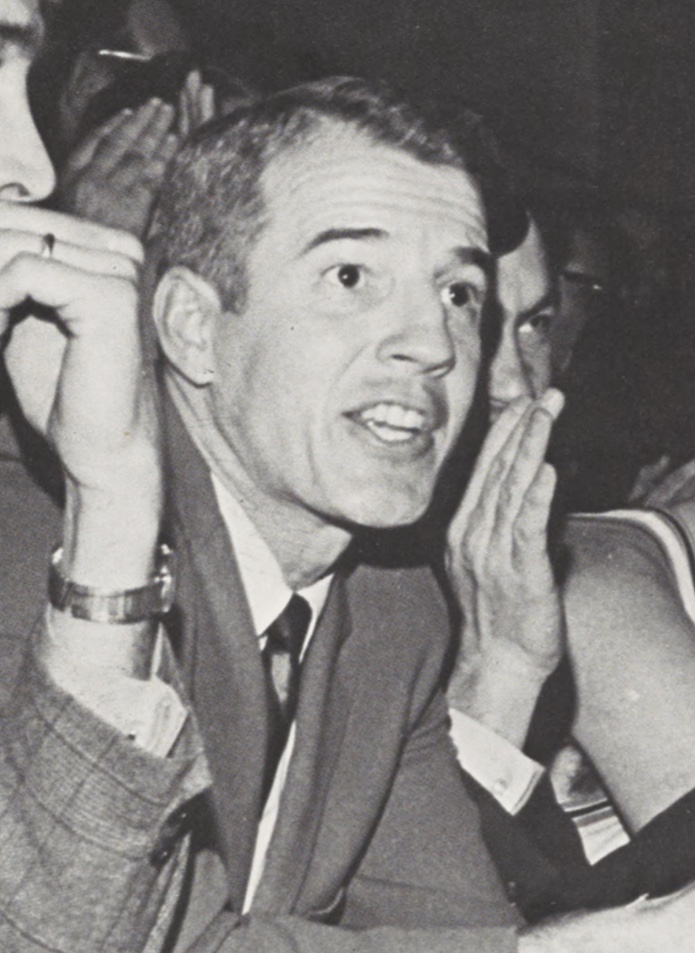
- Allen coaching at ODU

Biographical details
- Born: March 8, 1936; Moundsville, West Virginia, U.S.
- Died: September 11, 2020 (aged 84); Reno, Nevada, U.S.

Playing career
- 1956–1960: Marshall
- Position: Point guard

Coaching career (HC unless noted)
- 1960–1965: Marshall (assistant)
- 1965–1975: Old Dominion
- 1975–1980: SMU
- 1980–1987: Nevada
- 1988: Las Vegas Silver Streaks
- 1989–1990: Santa Barbara Islanders
- 1997–1998: Dallas Mavericks (assistant)
- 1998: Detroit Shock (assistant)
- 1999–2001: Sacramento Monarchs

Head coaching record
- Overall: 613–383

Accomplishments and honors

Championships
- NCAA Division II (1975)

Sonny Allen (March 8, 1936 – September 11, 2020) was an American college basketball coach. He was the head coach at Old Dominion University from 1965 to 1975; leading the Monarchs to six NCAA College/Division II Tournaments, winning in 1975, finishing runner-up in 1971 and finishing fourth in 1976. He then accepted the Southern Methodist University job, spending the 1975–76 through 1979–80 seasons in Dallas, he then moved to the University of Nevada, Reno from 1980 to 1987.

He was later the head coach for the Sacramento Monarchs of the Women's National Basketball Association (WNBA) from 1999 to 2001. He died of Parkinson's Disease in Reno, Nevada.

== Head coaching record ==
=== WNBA ===
Legend
Regular season	G	Games coached	W	Games won	L	Games lost	W–L %	Win–loss %
Playoffs	PG	Playoff games	PW	Playoff wins	PL	Playoff losses	PW–L %	Playoff win–loss %

Team	Year	G	W	L	W–L%	Finish	PG	PW	PL	PW–L%	Result
Sacramento	1999	32	19	13	.594	3rd in West	0	1	1	.000	Lost in conference semifinals
Sacramento	2000	32	21	11	.656	3rd in West	0	2	2	.000	Lost in conference semifinals
Sacramento	2001	12	6	6	.500	(replaced)	—	—	—		—
Career		76	46	30	.605		0	3	3	.000	
