= Hollyfield =

Hollyfield may refer to:

== Surname ==
- Larry Hollyfield (b. 1951/1952), basketball player
- Lazlo Hollyfield, fictional character in comedy film Real Genius

== Other ==
- Hollyfield School, English co-educational academy school

== See also ==
- Holyfield (disambiguation)
