= Ruthie Bolton =

American women's basketball player

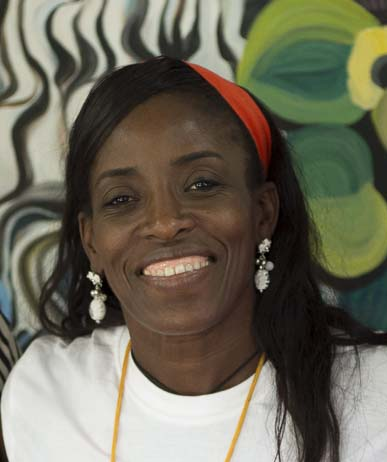
- Bolton in 2017

Personal information
- Born: May 25, 1967 (age 59) Lucedale, Mississippi, U.S.
- Listed height: 5 ft 9 in (1.75 m)
- Listed weight: 137 lb (62 kg)

Career information
- High school: McLain (McLain, Mississippi)
- College: Auburn (1985–1989)
- WNBA draft: 1997: Allocated
- Drafted by: Sacramento Monarchs
- Playing career: 1990–2004
- Position: Guard
- Number: 6

Career history
- 1992–1993: C.A. Fainzia
- 1993–1995: Erreti Faenza
- 1997–2004: Sacramento Monarchs

Career highlights
- 2× WNBA All-Star (1999, 2001); All-WNBA First Team (1997); No. 6 retired by Sacramento Monarchs; USA Basketball Female Athlete of the Year (1991)
- Stats at WNBA.com
- Stats at Basketball Reference
- Women's Basketball Hall of Fame
Medals
Women's basketball
Representing the United States
Olympic Games
Gold medal – first place	1996 Atlanta	Team competition
Gold medal – first place	2000 Sydney	Team competition
World University Games
Gold medal – first place	1991 Sheffield	Team competition
FIBA World Championship for Women
Bronze medal – third place	1994 Sydney	Team competition
Gold medal – first place	1998 Berlin	Team competition

Alice Ruth Bolton (born May 25, 1967), known as Ruthie Bolton, is an American former professional women's basketball player. Born in Lucedale, Mississippi, she played at the collegiate, Olympic and professional levels of women's basketball. Bolton played in the Women's National Basketball Association (WNBA) from 1997 through 2004 with the Sacramento Monarchs. She played collegiately at Auburn University, teaming with her older sister, Mae Ola Bolton. She was inducted into the Women's Basketball Hall of Fame in 2011, and was inducted into the Naismith Basketball Hall of Fame in 2026 as a member of the 1996 United States women's Olympic basketball team. Bolton has also served as a first lieutenant in the United States Army Reserves as a transportation officer.

== Professional career ==
Bolton started her professional career for the Visby Ladies in Sweden during the 1990–91 season. The following season, she played in Hungary, becoming the first USA woman to play professionally in the country. She spent the 1992–93 season with C.A. Fainzia in Italy, averaging 26 points per game.

In 1994, Bolton moved to Italy to play for Erreti Faenza. During the 1993–94 season, she averaged 28 points and 7.1 rebounds per game. She stayed with Faenza the following season where she averaged 25.5 points and 6.0 rebounds per game. During the 1995–96 season, Bolton played in Turkey.

On January 22, 1997, Bolton was selected with the 13th pick of the initial player allocation for the 1997 WNBA draft by the Sacramento Monarchs. Her debut game was played on June 21, 1997 in a 73 - 61 win over the Utah Starzz where she recorded 16 points, 11 rebounds and 6 steals. Thanks to this stat line, Bolton recorded the 2nd ever double-double in WNBA history. The first one happening earlier that day on June 21 in a Los Angeles Sparks and New York Liberty matchup where Lisa Leslie recorded 16 points and 14 rebounds.

Bolton would play 8 years in the WNBA from 1997 to 2004, all 8 seasons with the Monarchs and she was one of the franchise's marquee players. For the 1998 season, she only played 5 games due to dealing with a near career-ending knee injury, but she bounced back and made the All-Star team in the 1999 season. She made the All-Star team again in 2001 season. Throughout her 8 seasons with the team, Bolton and the Monarchs made the playoffs 5 times. Although they didn't reach the Finals during this period, the team reached the Western Conference Finals in 2001, 2003 and 2004.

Bolton's final game was played in Game 3 of the 2004 Western Conference Finals on October 5, 2004 against the Seattle Storm. The Monarchs would lose the game 62 - 82 and be eliminated from the playoffs with Bolton recording 4 points and 1 steal in her final game.

=== Feeling of Rejection by the Sacramento Monarchs ===
After the crushing playoff elimination in 2004, Bolton would reluctantly retire from the WNBA. Bolton has gone on record saying that she was not ready to retire at the end of the 2004 season and she felt that she was pressured to retire by the Monarchs' organization, so that they can develop their younger talent such as Rebekkah Brunson and Nicole Powell. To make matters worse, the first year that Bolton wasn't on the team, the Monarchs finally overcame the hurdle and won their first WNBA Championship in 2005 by defeating the Connecticut Sun 3 - 1 in a best-of-five series.

Bolton cites this time as one of the darkest and most hurtful periods of her lifetime. She signed a training camp contract with the Monarchs on April 23, 2005 but did not make the final team and was waived on May 9, being told by Monarchs' staff that although they appreciated her efforts and loyalty to the franchise, she simply did not have it anymore and that retiring would be the better option. Bolton's father also died in 2005. Due to losing her father, being coerced into retiring and having to watch the Monarchs win their first championship immediately after she left the team, Bolton says that she felt abandoned by the franchise and that every aspect of her life came to a screeching halt.

She told Sky Sports "It felt like rejection. My father had passed away at the time and he was my rock and I couldn't talk to him. He was my anchor. Dealing with that at the time, and retiring from something I'd done for 25 years, it all came to a screeching halt. I had to really dig deep and pray, I had to face my adversaries. I felt like the organization had done me wrong. That situation was so easy for me to become unhealthy mentally, as I was still working for the organization and had to show up to work every day."

== WNBA career statistics ==
Legend
GP	Games played	GS	Games started	MPG	Minutes per game	RPG	Rebounds per game
APG	Assists per game	SPG	Steals per game	BPG	Blocks per game	PPG	Points per game
TO	Turnovers per game	FG%	Field-goal percentage	3P%	3-point field-goal percentage	FT%	Free-throw percentage
**Bold**	Career best	°	League leader

=== Regular season ===
Year	Team	GP	GS	MPG	FG%	3P%	FT%	RPG	APG	SPG	BPG	TO	PPG
1997	Sacramento	55	23	35.3	.402	.344	.768	5.8	2.6	2.3	0.0	2.5	19.4
1998	Sacramento	5	4	26.6	.293	.154	.607	2.2	1.2	1.2	0.0	1.4	11.0
1999	Sacramento	31	30	31.3	.364	.321	.798	4.3	2.4	1.0	0.0	1.4	13.6
2000	Sacramento	29	29	29.9	.361	.313	.762	3.7	2.0	1.2	0.0	1.6	13.1
2001	Sacramento	31	0	18.8	.338	.364	.692	3.0	1.8	0.9	0.0	1.3	7.2
2002	Sacramento	32	1	23.0	.396	.326	.727	2.9	1.2	1.4	0.1	1.1	10.9
2003	Sacramento	33	0	15.8	.314	.192	.769	1.7	1.1	1.0	0.1	0.6	4.5
2004	Sacramento	34	4	13.8	.370	.405	.737	1.4	0.9	0.7	0.0	0.4	4.7
Career	8 years, 1 team	218	91	23.4	.367	.319	.746	3.1	1.6	1.2	0.0	1.2	10.0

=== Postseason ===
Year	Team	GP	GS	MPG	FG%	3P%	FT%	RPG	APG	SPG	BPG	TO	PPG
1999	Sacramento	1	1	32.0	.400	.167	1.000	1.0	4.0	1.0	0.0	2.0	15.0
2000	Sacramento	2	2	35.0	.382	.286	1.000	4.5	3.5	2.0	0.0	2.5	19.5
2001	Sacramento	5	0	24.2	.386	.391	.923	4.4	1.8	0.8	0.0	2.0	11.0
2003	Sacramento	6	0	15.2	.214	.250	.000	1.7	1.0	0.3	0.0	0.8	2.5
2004	Sacramento	6	0	8.8	.167	.000	.750	0.7	0.5	0.7	0.0	0.5	1.5
Career	5 years, 1 team	20	3	18.4	.324	.266	.929	2.3	1.5	0.8	0.0	1.3	6.7

== USA Basketball ==
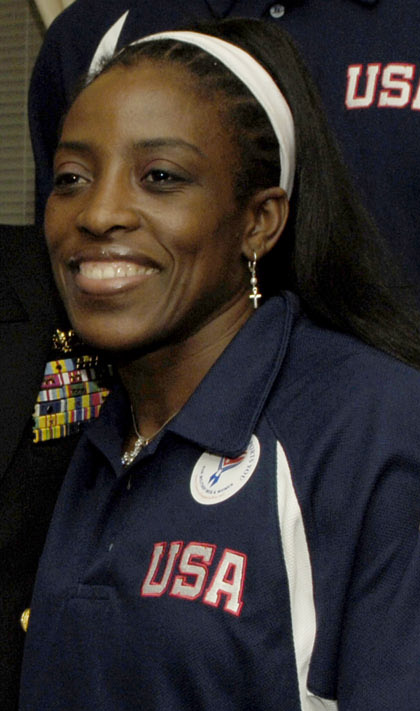
Bolton wearing a Team USA jersey in April 2006

Bolton was named to the team representing the US at the World University Games held during July 1991 in Sheffield, England. While the USA team had won gold in 1983, they finished with the silver in 1985, in fifth place in 1987, and did not field a team in 1989. The team was coached by Tara VanDerveer of Stanford. After winning opening games easily, the USA faced China in the medal round. The USA shot only 36% from the field, but limited the team from China to 35%, and won 79–76 to advance to the gold medal game. There they faced 7–0 Spain, but won 88–62 to claim the gold medal. Bolton was the team's leading scorer with 14 points per game, just ahead of Lisa Leslie's 13 points per game.

In 1994, Bolton-Holifield was named to the national team which competed in the World Championships in Sydney, Australia. The team was coached by Tara VanDerveer. The team won their early games, then advanced to the medal rounds and faced Brazil. Despite 17 points from Bolton-Holifield and 29 from Katrina McClain, the USA fell 110–107 when Brazil hit ten of ten free throws in the final minute. The USA went on to defeat Australia 100–95 to claim the bronze medal.

Bolton continued with the national team to the 1996 Olympics in Atlanta, Georgia. Bolton was the leading scorer in the game against Ukraine, with 21 points. She helped the team win all eight games to win the gold medal for the USA team. Bolton averaged 12.8 points per game and led the team in steals with 23.

The national team traveled to Berlin, Germany in July and August 1998 for the FIBA World Championships. The USA team won a close opening game against Japan 95–89, then won their next six games easily. In the semifinal game against Brazil, the USA team was behind as much as ten points in the first half. Bolton hit a three pointer in the second half to give her team the lead, as part of a 16-point scoring effort, and the USA went on to win 93–79. The gold medal game was a rematch against Russia. In the first game, the USA team dominated almost from the beginning, but in the rematch, the team from Russia took the early lead and led much of the way. With under two minutes remaining, the USA was down by two points when Bolton hit a three pointer to give the USA a lead. Russia tied the game, but Bolton hit another three to give the USA a lead they would not give up. The USA held on to win the gold medal 71–65.

Bolton continued with the national team to the 2000 Olympics in Sydney, Australia. The USA won all eight games, including the gold medal game against host Australia to win the gold medal. Bolton averaged 5.0 points per game.

== Auburn statistics ==
Legend
GP	Games played	GS	Games started	MPG	Minutes per game
FG%	Field goal percentage	3P%	3-point field goal percentage	FT%	Free throw percentage
RPG	Rebounds per game	APG	Assists per game	SPG	Steals per game
BPG	Blocks per game	PPG	Points per game	**Bold**	Career high

Year	Team	GP	Points	FG%	3P%	FT%	RPG	APG	SPG	BPG	PPG
1985-86	Auburn	30	296	53.3%	--	62.8%	**4.8**	1.4	1.6	0.0	**9.9**
1986-87	Auburn	33	275	52.1%	--	73.5%	2.9	2.3	1.6	0.0	8.3
1987-88	Auburn	**35**	**335**	**54.7%**	**62.5%**	**74.1%**	3.1	**6.1**	2.0	**0.1**	9.6
1988-89	Auburn	34	270	44.6%	37.5%	61.8%	4.2	5.7	**2.3**	0.0	7.9
TOTAL	Auburn	132	1176	51.1%	50.0%	68.8%	3.7	4.0	1.9	0.0	8.9

== Current activities ==
After being released by the Monarchs as an active player in 2005, she returned to the Monarchs to work in their front office, specializing in public relations. In 2004 and 2005, she served as the head coach for the women's basketball team at William Jessup University, a California Pacific Conference school in Rocklin, California. Currently Bolton is the head coach for women's basketball at Vacaville Christian High School in Vacaville, California; she also dabbles in gospel singing.

Ms. Bolton has also been an active participant in the Sport Diplomacy Sports Envoy program for the U.S. Department of State. In this function, she has traveled to Armenia, Australia, China, Moldova, Kazakhstan, Papua New Guinea, and Saudi Arabia to conduct basketball clinics for approximately 1300 youth and women worldwide. In so doing, Bolton helped contribute to the Sport Diplomacy's mission to promote greater understanding and inclusion through sport and supported the U.S. foreign policy goal of advancing the status of women and girls around the world.

She currently lives in Sacramento, California.

Ruthie Bolton continues to work with the Golden State Warriors participating in many of their youth camps. She also continues to do her 'AIM HIGH' program at many junior high and high schools throughout Sacramento County and beyond. Ruthie Bolton is now endorsing the opening of "Ruthie's Place" which will be located in the Oak Park area of Sacramento. Ruthie's Place will be a place for (1) Trauma Informed Domestic Violence Support Center for women and families (2) The first youth drop in support services center for girls and LGBTQ youth that are being exploited and sex trafficked throughout Sacramento County (3) Boutique Thrift Center that is a social renewal model (Teach one, reach one). Ruthie is collaborating with A Community For Peace (ACFP) on Ruthie's Place. www.acommunityforpeace.org.

In 2014, Ruthie was inducted into the Multi-Ethnic Sports Hall of Fame.

Ruthie Bolton is a published author who has written two books (1) From Pain to Peace and (2) The Ride of a Lifetime.
