= SportsUnited =

Division overview
- Formed: 2002
- Parent Division: U.S. Department of State

Formerly known as SportsUnited, Sports Diplomacy is the U.S. Department of State's sports diplomacy division. Sports Diplomacy uses sport to help youth around the world develop important off-the-court skills, including leadership, mutual understanding and academic achievement. The four pillars of the program include Sports Envoys, Sports Visitors, Sports Grants, and the Empowering Women and Girls through Sport Initiative. The program began in 2002 and has since reached thousands of participants in more than 140 countries. An overarching theme in most of Sports Diplomacy’s programming is disability sport access and inclusion.

== History ==
The U.S. Department of State, through the SportsUnited division, restarted sports programming in 2002 with a grants competition focused on Muslim community outreach. In 2003 the State Department brought a group of Iraqi archers to the U.S. to compete in the World Archery Championship. The State Department implemented the first Sports Envoy program in 2005 through a partnership with the NBA and Reebok. In 2006, the “World Cup Sports Initiative” marked the first large-scale sport diplomacy effort of the nascent SportsUnited Division. The World Cup Sports Initiative brought to the U.S. 30 youth from 13 countries to participate in World Cup-related programming around the theme “A time to make friends.” The program culminated with a visit to Germany, where the group attended a World Cup match between the U.S. and the host country. Since then, Sports Diplomacy has involved more than 1500 athletes and coaches from over 140 countries in its programs.

== Programs ==
=== Sports Envoys ===
The Sports Envoy program sends professional athletes overseas to conduct sport camps and engage in dialogue about important life lessons such as education, leadership, conflict resolution, and respect for diversity. Since 2005, the U.S. Department of State has sent nearly 300 Sports Envoys almost 70 countries including Afghanistan, Burma, Japan, and Venezuela. Past envoys include Michelle Kwan, Carl Ripken Jr., and Ken Griffey Jr.

=== Sports Visitors ===
Sport Visitors are non-elite youth athletes and coaches who come to the U.S. for two weeks to participate in sport workshops and learn first-hand about American society and culture. The Sports Visitor program gives young people an opportunity to discover how success in athletics translates into the development of life skills and achievement in the classroom. Since 2003, Sports Diplomacy has brought more than 1,100 young athletes and coaches from 140 countries to the U.S. to participate in Sports Visitor programs.

=== Sports Grants ===
The Sports Grants program is an annual open grant competition for U.S.-based, non-profit organizations that work with sport and non-elite youth athletes, domestically and internationally. The grants support programs which address any of the following themes: Sport for Social Change, Sport and Health, and Sport and Disability. Between 2002 and 2012, the Sports Grants program has awarded nearly 90 grants to U.S. based non-profit organizations implementing programs in 60 countries. Previous grants recipients have included Partners of the Americas and Mobility International USA.

=== Empowering Women and Girls through Sport Initiative ===
The Empowering Women and Girls through Sport Initiative was launched in February 2011 as a partnership between the U.S. Department of State and espnW. To increase the number of women and girls worldwide who are involved in sports, the Empowering Women and Girls Through Sports Initiative mobilizes all of the U.S. Department of State’s international sports programming, from Sports Envoys traveling overseas to Sports Visitors traveling to the United States. A cornerstone of this initiative is the Global Sports Mentoring Program which connects women and girls from around the globe with female executives in the sports sector. The 2012 Global Sports Mentoring Program included a diverse group of 17 participants. Between 2012 and 2014, women from 38 different countries have participated in these month-long mentorships, which culminate in an action plan for the mentee to implement in her home country.

== Notable alumni ==
- Ruthie Bolton
- Tamika Catchings
- Brandi Chastain
- Lorrie Fair
- Julie Foudy
- Michelle Kwan
- Barry Larkin
- Dikembe Mutombo
- Sam Perkins
- Cal Ripken
- Tony Sanneh
