= 2000 WNBA playoffs =

Professional women's basketball tournament

- Dates: August 11–26, 2000

Final positions
- Champions: Houston Comets
- Runners-up: New York Liberty

Tournament statistics
- Scoring leader(s): Cynthia Cooper-Dyke (Houston) (136)

Awards
- MVP: Cynthia Cooper-Dyke (Houston)

The 2000 WNBA playoffs was the postseason for the Women's National Basketball Association's 2000 season which ended with the Western Conference champion Houston Comets beating the Eastern Conference champion New York Liberty, 2–0. Cynthia Cooper was named the MVP of the Finals.

== Regular season standings ==
Eastern Conference

Eastern Conference	W	L	PCT	Conf.	GB
New York Liberty ^{x}	20	12	.625	14–7	–
Cleveland Rockers ^{x}	17	15	.531	13–8	3.0
Orlando Miracle ^{x}	16	16	.500	13–8	4.0
Washington Mystics ^{x}	14	18	.438	13–8	6.0
Detroit Shock ^{o}	14	18	.438	10–11	6.0
Miami Sol ^{o}	13	19	.406	9–12	7.0
Indiana Fever ^{o}	9	23	.281	7–14	11.0
Charlotte Sting ^{o}	8	24	.250	5–16	12.0

Western Conference

Western Conference	W	L	PCT	Conf.	GB
Los Angeles Sparks ^{x}	28	4	.875	17–4	–
Houston Comets ^{x}	27	5	.844	17–4	1.0
Sacramento Monarchs ^{x}	21	11	.656	13–8	7.0
Phoenix Mercury ^{x}	20	12	.625	11–10	8.0
Utah Starzz ^{o}	18	14	.563	13–8	10.0
Minnesota Lynx ^{o}	15	17	.469	5–16	13.0
Portland Fire ^{o}	10	22	.313	4–17	18.0
Seattle Storm ^{o}	6	26	.188	4–17	22.0

Note: Teams with an "X" clinched playoff spots.

== Bracket ==
There were 16 teams in the league. For the playoffs, the four teams with the best record in each conference were seeded one to four.

**Conference semifinals** Best-of-3
E1	**New York**	**2**
E4	Washington	0
**Eastern Conference**
E2	**Cleveland**	**2**
E3	Orlando	1
W1	**Los Angeles**	**2**
W4	Phoenix	0
**Western Conference**
W2	**Houston**	**2**
W3	Sacramento	0

**Conference finals** Best-of-3
E1	**New York**	**2**
E2	Cleveland	1
W1	Los Angeles	0
W2	**Houston**	**2**

**WNBA Finals**; Best-of-3
E1	New York	0
W2	**Houston**	**2**

- **Bold** – Series winner
- Italics – Team with home-court advantage

== Conference semifinals ==
=== Cleveland Rockers vs. Orlando Miracle ===
August 11

Recap

Cleveland Rockers 55, **Orlando Miracle** **62**
Scoring by half: 29–28, 26–34
Pts: Merlakia Jones 18; Rebs: Brown, Jones 6 each Asts: Rushia Brown 4	Pts: Taj McWilliams 16; Rebs: Taj McWilliams 10; Asts: Shannon Johnson 5
**Orlando leads series, 1–0**

TD Waterhouse Centre, Orlando, Florida
Attendance: 6,265
Referees: Sally Bell, Michael Henderson, Barb Smith

August 13

Recap

Orlando Miracle 54, **Cleveland Rockers** **63**
Scoring by half: 15–36, 39–27
Pts: Adrienne Johnson 17; Rebs: Shannon Johnson 9 Asts: Shannon Johnson 7	Pts: Jones, Darling 15 each Rebs: Chasity Melvin 10; Asts: Suzie McConnell-Serio 6
**Series tied, 1–1**

Gund Arena, Cleveland, Ohio
Attendance: 9,755
Referees: Patty Broderick, Patrick Fraher, Gary Zielinski

August 15

Recap

Orlando Miracle 43, **Cleveland Rockers** **72**
Scoring by half: 21–32, 22–40
Pts: Nykesha Sales 13; Rebs: Taj McWilliams 8 Asts: Dos Santos, McWilliams, S. Johnson, A. Johnson 2 each	Pts: Ann Wauters 12; Rebs: Merlakia Jones 7 Asts: Suzie McConnell-Serio 7
**Cleveland wins series, 2–1**

Gund Arena, Cleveland, Ohio
Attendance: 9,528
Referees: June Courteau, Bob Trammell, Dennis DeMayo

=== New York Liberty vs. Washington Mystics ===
August 12

Recap

**New York Liberty** **72**, Washington Mystics 63
Scoring by half: 40–28, 32–35
Pts: Johnson, Phillips 20 each Rebs: Vickie Johnson 8 Asts: Teresa Weatherspoon 9	Pts: Vicky Bullett 22; Rebs: Holdsclaw, Bullett 8 each Asts: Nikki McCray 11
**New York leads series, 1–0**

MCI Center, Washington, D.C.
Attendance: 16,331
Referees: Melissa Barlow, Lisa Mattingly, Bob Trammell

August 14

Recap

Washington Mystics 57, **New York Liberty** **78**
Scoring by half: 25–40, 32–38
Pts: Holdsclaw, Aldridge 12 each Rebs: Markita Aldridge 4 Asts: Markita Aldridge 5	Pts: Becky Hammon 19; Rebs: Tari Phillips 10; Asts: Teresa Weatherspoon 10
**New York wins series, 2–0**

Madison Square Garden, New York City, New York
Attendance: 15,309
Referees: Dennis DeMayo, Courtney Kirkland, Mark Ayotte

=== Los Angeles Sparks vs. Phoenix Mercury ===
August 11

Recap

**Los Angeles Sparks** **86**, Phoenix Mercury 71
Scoring by half: 43–24, 43–47
Pts: Lisa Leslie 20; Rebs: Lisa Leslie 11; Asts: Tamecka Dixon 5	Pts: Brandy Reed 17; Rebs: Lisa Harrison 9 Asts: Brandy Reed 6
**Los Angeles leads series, 1–0**

America West Arena, Phoenix, Arizona
Attendance: 6,167
Referees: Jason Phillips, Bill Stokes, Bonita Spence

August 13

Recap

Phoenix Mercury 76, **Los Angeles Sparks** **101**
Scoring by half: 36–42, 40–59
Pts: Harrison, Gillom 16 each Rebs: Michelle Griffiths 6 Asts: Lisa Harrison 5	Pts: Lisa Leslie 29; Rebs: Leslie, Mabika 8 each Asts: Tamecka Dixon 7
**Los Angeles wins series, 2–0**

Great Western Forum, Inglewood, California
Attendance: 9,811
Referees: Michael Price, Teresa Dahlem, Roy Gulbeyan

=== Houston Comets vs. Sacramento Monarchs ===
August 12

Recap

**Houston Comets** **72**, Sacramento Monarchs 64
Scoring by half: 35–37, 37–27
Pts: Cynthia Cooper 25; Rebs: Tiffani Johnson 8 Asts: Thompson, Cooper 3 each	Pts: Ruthie Bolton-Holifield 16; Rebs: Yolanda Griffith 14; Asts: Kedra Holland-Corn 5
**Houston leads series, 1–0**

Arco Arena, Sacramento, California
Attendance: 8,053
Referees: Matthew Boland, June Courteau, Lamont Simpson

August 14

Recap

Sacramento Monarchs 70, **Houston Comets** **75**
Scoring by half: 37–38, 33–37
Pts: Ruthie Bolton-Holifield 23; Rebs: Yolanda Griffith 10; Asts: Ticha Penicheiro 10	Pts: Sheryl Swoopes 27; Rebs: Tina Thompson 14; Asts: Sheryl Swoopes 6
**Houston wins series, 2–0**

Compaq Center, Houston, Texas
Attendance: 11,664
Referees: Sally Bell, Derek Collins, Barb Smith

== Conference finals ==
=== New York Liberty vs. Cleveland Rockers ===
August 17

Recap

New York Liberty 43, **Cleveland Rockers** **56**
Scoring by half: 21–29, 22–27
Pts: Tari Phillips 11; Rebs: Tari Phillips 6 Asts: Teresa Weatherspoon 3	Pts: Rushia Brown 18; Rebs: Chasity Melvin 9 Asts: Suzie McConnell-Serio 5
**Cleveland leads series, 1–0**

Gund Arena, Cleveland, Ohio
Attendance: 11,686
Referees: Lisa Mattingly, Derek Collins, Michael Price

August 20

Recap

Cleveland Rockers 45, **New York Liberty** **51**
Scoring by half: 17–36, 28–15
Pts: Merlakia Jones 18; Rebs: Merlakia Jones 12; Asts: Helen Darling 3	Pts: Becky Hammon 13; Rebs: Tari Phillips 6 Asts: Teresa Weatherspoon 9
**Series tied, 1–1**

Madison Square Garden, New York City, New York
Attendance: 15,865
Referees: Sally Bell, Courtney Kirkland, Gary Zielinski

August 21

Recap

Cleveland Rockers 67, **New York Liberty** **81**
Scoring by half: 27–46, 40–35
Pts: Jones, McConnell-Serio 13 each Rebs: Chasity Melvin 9 Asts: Helen Darling 4	Pts: Tamika Whitmore 19; Rebs: Sue Wicks 6 Asts: Vickie Johnson 10
**New York wins series, 2–1**

Madison Square Garden, New York City, New York
Attendance: 15,173
Referees: Patty Broderick, Bill Stokes, Jason Phillips

=== Los Angeles Sparks vs. Houston Comets ===
August 17

Recap

Los Angeles Sparks 56, **Houston Comets** **77**
Scoring by half: 23–40, 33–37
Pts: Mwadi Mabika 21; Rebs: Lisa Leslie 8 Asts: Milton, Figgs 4 each	Pts: Sheryl Swoopes 22; Rebs: Arcain, Swoopes 6 each Asts: Thompson, Arcain 3 each
**Houston leads series, 1–0**

Compaq Center, Houston, Texas
Attendance: 14,597
Referees: Patty Broderick, Melissa Barlow, Jason Phillips

August 20

Recap

**Houston Comets** **74**, Los Angeles Sparks 69
Scoring by half: 40–35, 34–34
Pts: Cynthia Cooper 29; Rebs: Tina Thompson 6 Asts: Sheryl Swoopes 6	Pts: Mwadi Mabika 19; Rebs: Lisa Leslie 14; Asts: Leslie, Figgs 5 each
**Houston wins series, 2–0**

Great Western Forum, Inglewood, California
Attendance: 13,884
Referees: Dennis DeMayo, Teresa Dahlem, Patrick Fraher

== WNBA Championship ==
August 24

Recap

**Houston Comets** **59**, New York Liberty 52
Scoring by half: 29–22, 30–30
Pts: Cynthia Cooper 20; Rebs: Swoopes, Thompson 8 each Asts: Cynthia Cooper 5	Pts: Tari Phillips 24; Rebs: Tari Phillips 15; Asts: Teresa Weatherspoon 5
**Houston leads series, 1–0**

Madison Square Garden, New York City, New York
Attendance: 19,563
Referees: Gary Zielinski, Sally Bell, Dennis DeMayo

August 26

Recap

New York Liberty 73, **Houston Comets** **79** (OT)
Scoring by half: 25–27, 39–37 Overtime: 9–15
Pts: Tari Phillips 20; Rebs: Tari Phillips 7 Asts: Teresa Weatherspoon 8	Pts: Sheryl Swoopes 31; Rebs: Tina Thompson 8 Asts: Cynthia Cooper 7
**Houston wins series, 2–0**

Compaq Center, Houston, Texas
Attendance: 16,285
Referees: June Courteau, Michael Price, Courtney Kirkland

== See also ==
- List of WNBA Champions
