= Holyfield (surname) =

Holyfield is a surname. Notable people with the surname include:

- Elijah Holyfield (born 1998), American football player
- Evander Holyfield (born 1962), American world champion heavyweight boxer
- Michael Holyfield (born 1992), American basketball player
- Wayland Holyfield (1942–2024), American songwriter
