= Yolanda Griffith =

American basketball player (born 1970)

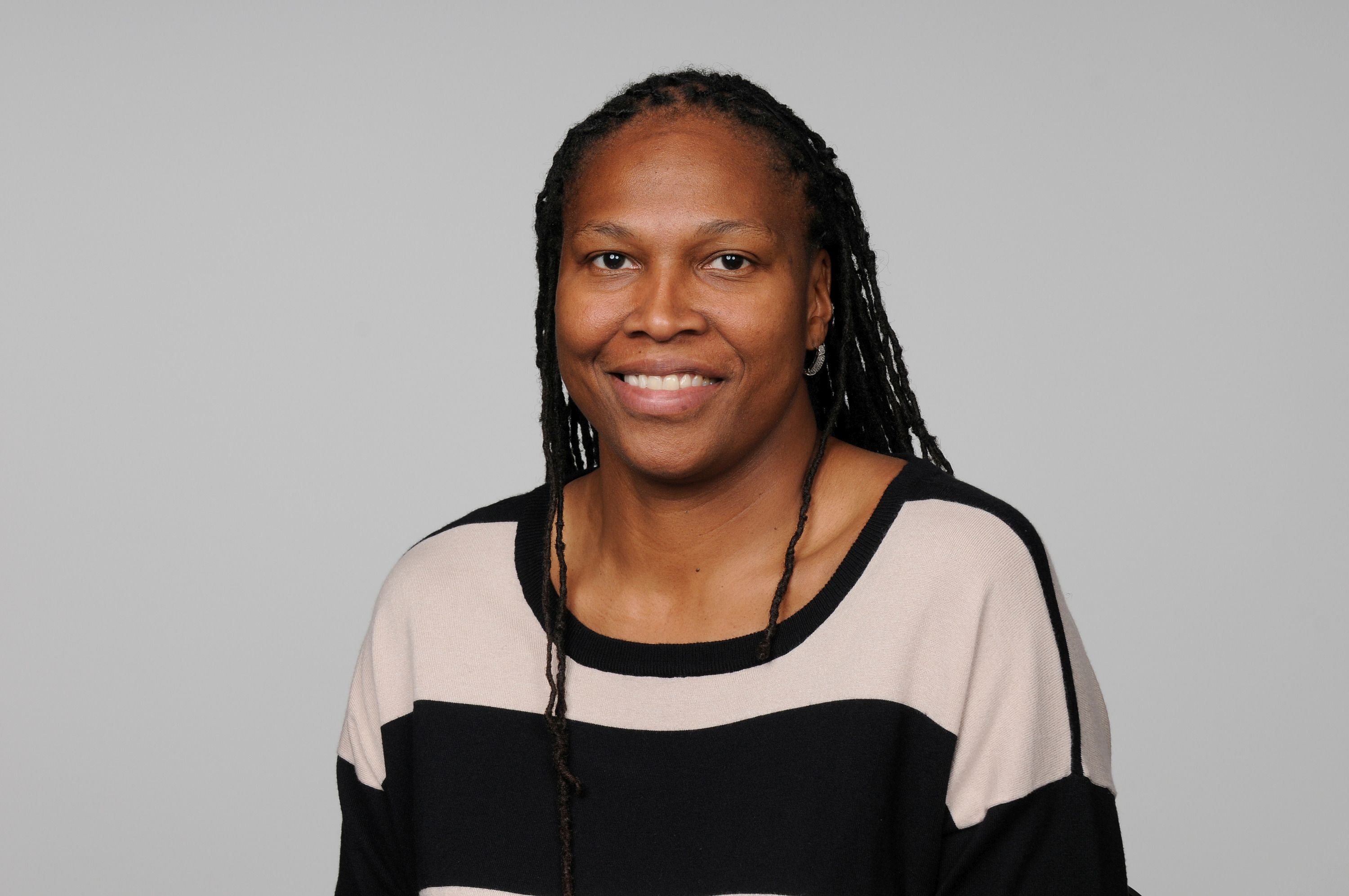
- Griffith in 2014

Personal information
- Born: March 1, 1970 (age 56) Chicago, Illinois, U.S.
- Listed height: 6 ft 3 in (1.91 m)
- Listed weight: 188 lb (85 kg)

Career information
- High school: Carver (Chicago, Illinois)
- College: Palm Beach CC (1990–1992); Florida Atlantic (1992–1993)
- WNBA draft: 1999: 1st round, 2nd overall pick
- Drafted by: Sacramento Monarchs
- Playing career: 1993–2009
- Position: Center
- Number: 33, 13

Career history
- 1993–1997: DJK Wildcats Aschaffenburg
- 1997–1998: Long Beach Stingrays
- 1998: Chicago Condors
- 1999–2007: Sacramento Monarchs
- 2000–2002: Lavezzini Basket Parma
- 2003–2006: UMMC Ekaterinburg
- 2008: Seattle Storm
- 2009: Indiana Fever

Career highlights
- WNBA champion (2005); WNBA Finals MVP (2005); WNBA MVP (1999); 8× WNBA All-Star (1999–2001, 2003–2007); 2× All-WNBA First Team (1999, 2005); 3× All-WNBA Second Team (2000, 2001, 2004); 2× WNBA rebounding champion (1999, 2001); 2× WNBA steals champion (1999, 2004); WNBA Defensive Player of the Year (1999); 2× WNBA All-Defensive Team (2005, 2006); WNBA anniversary teams (10th, 15th, 20th, 25th); Russian League Player of the Year (2005); First-team Parade All-American (1989)
- Stats at WNBA.com
- Stats at Basketball Reference
- Basketball Hall of Fame
- Women's Basketball Hall of Fame
Medals
Women's basketball
Representing the United States
Olympic Games
Gold medal – first place	2000 Sydney	National team
Gold medal – first place	2004 Athens	National team

Yolanda Evette Griffith (born March 1, 1970) is an American former professional basketball player who played in both the ABL and WNBA. An eight time WNBA All-Star, she was named the 1999 WNBA MVP and the WNBA Finals MVP in 2005 when she won the WNBA championship with the Sacramento Monarchs. One of the top defensive players in WNBA's history, she was the 1999 WNBA Defensive Player of the Year and led the league in rebounds and steals two times each. In 2011, she was voted in by fans as one of the top 15 players in WNBA history. She is sometimes called by her nicknames: "Yo" and "Yo-Yo". Griffith was inducted into the 2014 Women's Basketball Hall of Fame's class on her first year of eligibility. In 2021, she was inducted into the Naismith Basketball Hall of Fame.

== Early life ==
Born in Chicago, Illinois, Griffith attended George Washington Carver High School in the Chicago area. In her senior year (1988–1989), she was named First-team Parade All-American, as well as first team All-America in softball.

== College career ==
Griffith was offered a scholarship to play for the women's basketball team at the University of Iowa, but had to cancel it after she gave birth to her daughter, Candace.

Afterward, she attended Palm Beach Junior College in Lake Worth, Florida, where she earned Junior College All-America honors in 1990–91. She later transferred to Florida Atlantic University, which was then a Division II school, where she graduated in 1993, earning Kodak Division II Player of the Year honors. While in school, she supported herself and her daughter by working for a car repossession company.

== Professional career ==
=== Germany ===
Following her graduating from college, Griffith began her professional basketball playing career in Germany with DJK Wildcats Aschaffenburg, where she played from 1993 to 1997. In 1997, she finished as the top scorer and rebounder in the Euroleague Women, averaging 24.7 points and 17.1 rebounds per game.

=== American Basketball League ===
After four seasons in Germany, Griffith joined the American Basketball League (ABL). She was selected by the Long Beach Stingrays as the number one pick overall in the ABL players draft. In their only season, Griffith led the Stingrays to the brink of the ABL title, only to lose to the defending champions, the Columbus Quest. Griffith was named the 1997–1998 ABL Defensive Player of the Year and to the All-ABL first team. She finished second in the ABL's 1998 Most Valuable Player voting to her future 2000 Summer Olympics teammate Natalie Williams.

When the Long Beach franchise folded after the end of the 1997–98 season, she was dealt to the expansion Chicago Condors, in her hometown. She played there only briefly, however, as the league folded on December 22, 1998. Prior to that, Griffith ranked fifth among league leaders in scoring (17.2 ppg), first in rebounding (12.3 rpg), 19th in assists (2.6 apg), second in steals (3.3 spg), and second in blocked shots (1.3 bpg).

=== WNBA ===
The Sacramento Monarchs selected Griffith No. 2 overall in the 1999 WNBA draft. She is a seven-time WNBA All-Star, and won the WNBA's MVP, Newcomer of the Year and Defensive Player awards in 1999.

In 2001, Griffith set the WNBA single-season record for most offensive rebounds with 162.

In 2005, the Monarchs won their first WNBA title over the Connecticut Sun, three games to one in a best-of-five series. Griffith was named Finals MVP.

On April 8, 2008, after nine seasons with the Sacramento Monarchs, Griffith signed with the Seattle Storm.

On February 20, 2009, Griffith signed with the Indiana Fever, after a one-year stint with the Storm.

On June 9, 2009, Griffith tore her achilles tendon in a game against the Seattle Storm, her former team. In August the same year, she announced her retirement from professional basketball. In 2011, she was voted in by fans as one of the top 15 players in the fifteen-year history of the WNBA. In 2016, Griffith was once again honoured by the WNBA in the WNBA Top 20@20 in celebration of the league's 20th season.

=== Europe ===
As the WNBA and the seasons in Europe did not overlap, Griffith, like many other WNBA players played in Europe during the winter. She played two seasons for Lavezzini Basket Parma in Italy from 2000 to 2002. In 2003–2004 and 2005–2006, she played for Russian club UMMC Ekaterinburg.

== National team career ==
Griffith has twice been a member of the U.S. National Women's Basketball team. She won Gold Medals at the Summer Olympics in both 2000 and 2004. Griffith served as a member of the USA Basketball Women's Development National Team Committee from 2013 to 2016. The Women's Developmental National Team committees selected coaches and athletes for USA Basketball teams competing in the 2013 and 2015 FIBA Americas U16 Championships, and the 2014 and 2016 FIBA U17 World Championships. The Men's Developmental National Team Committee also selected staff and players for the annual Nike Hoop Summit.

== Coaching career ==
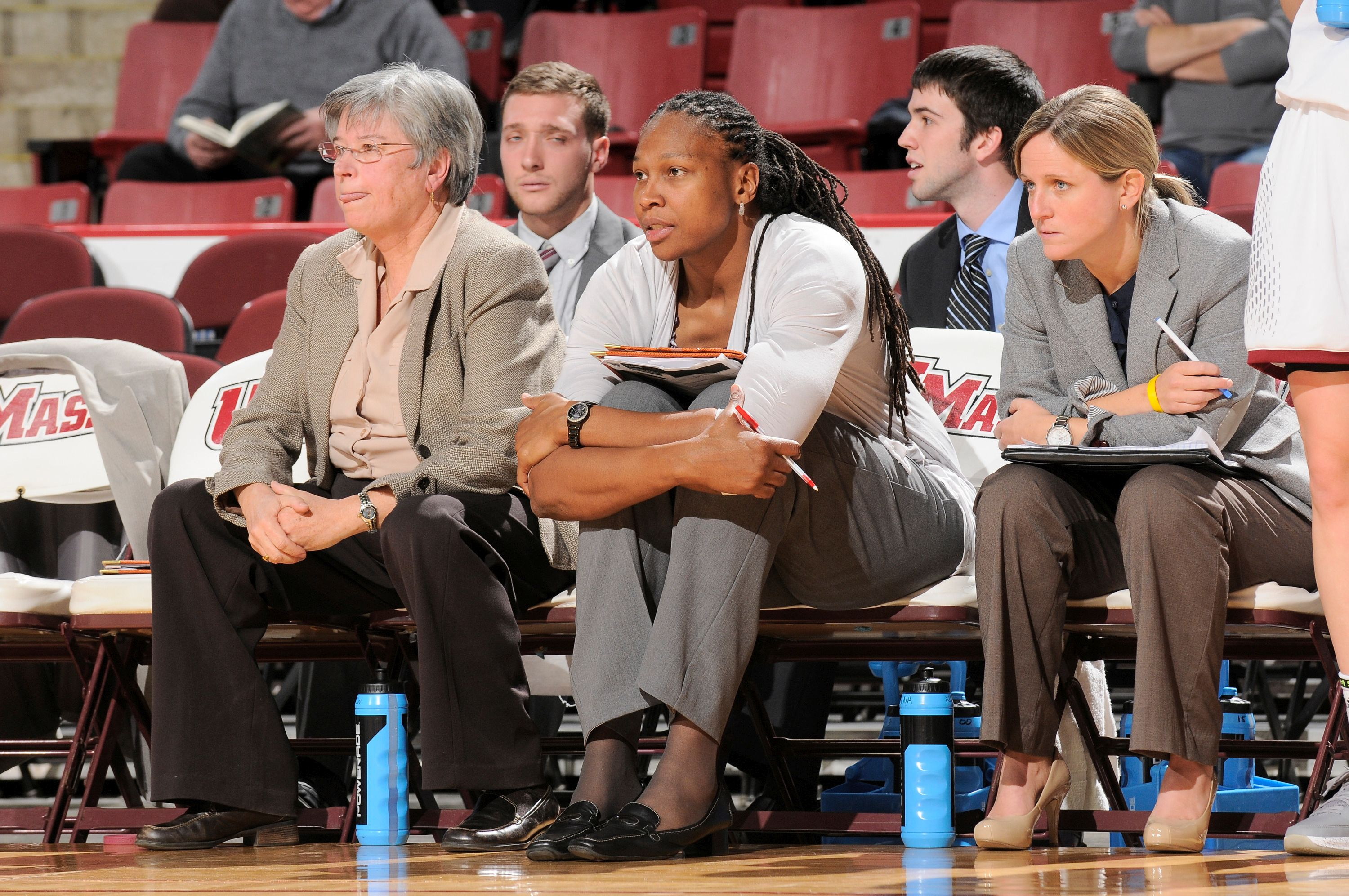
Griffith coaching from the sidelines in 2014

Griffith began her coaching career in 2009 as an assistant coach with the Indiana Fever. In 2011, Griffith accepted an assistant coach position with Ivy League university Dartmouth, located in Hanover, New Hampshire. In 2013, Griffith was named the first assistant coach for Lafayette College, a member of the Patriot League.

She was later an assistant coach for Joanna Bernabei-MacNamee at the University of Albany. When Bernabei-MacNamee was named as the new head coach at Boston College in 2018, she brought Griffith along as her assistant. Griffith has been instrumental in the development of post players at BC.

== Statistics ==
=== WNBA career statistics ===
Legend
GP	Games played	GS	Games started	MPG	Minutes per game	RPG	Rebounds per game
APG	Assists per game	SPG	Steals per game	BPG	Blocks per game	PPG	Points per game
TO	Turnovers per game	FG%	Field-goal percentage	3P%	3-point field-goal percentage	FT%	Free-throw percentage
**Bold**	Career best	°	League leader

==== Regular season ====
Year	Team	GP	GS	MPG	FG%	3P%	FT%	RPG	APG	SPG	BPG	TO	PPG
1999	Sacramento	29	29	33.8	**.541**	.000	.617	**11.3**°	1.6	2.5°	**1.9**	2.28	**18.8**
2000	Sacramento	32	32	32.1	.535	.000	.706	10.3	1.5	**2.6**	**1.9**	2.56	16.3
2001	Sacramento	32	31	33.7	.522	.000	.720	11.2°	**1.7**	2.0	1.2	2.34	16.2
2002	Sacramento	17	17	**33.9**	.520	.000	.803	8.7	1.1	0.9	0.8	2.65	16.9
2003	Sacramento	**34**	**34**	29.9	.485	.000	.774	7.3	1.4	1.7	1.1	2.21	13.8
2004	Sacramento	**34**	**34**	30.3	.519	.000	**.853**	7.2	1.2	2.2°	1.2	1.74	14.5
2005^{†}	Sacramento	**34**	33	28.3	.485	.000	.707	6.6	1.5	1.2	0.9	2.00	13.8
2006	Sacramento	**34**	**34**	25.1	.457	.000	.751	6.4	1.6	1.3	0.5	1.94	12.0
2007	Sacramento	32	32	23.1	.502	.000	.658	4.6	1.5	1.0	0.4	2.03	9.0
2008	Seattle	30	30	21.9	.462	.000	.648	6.3	1.5	1.4	0.6	1.70	7.2
2009	Indiana	3	0	13.7	.500	.000	.778	2.3	0.0	0.0	0.7	**1.00**	6.3
Career	11 years, 3 teams	311	306	28.8	.506	.000	.713	7.9	1.5	1.7	1.0	2.11	13.6

==== Postseason ====
Year	Team	GP	GS	MPG	FG%	3P%	FT%	RPG	APG	SPG	BPG	TO	PPG
2000	Sacramento	2	2	**39.0**	.522	.000	.625	**12.0**°	1.0	0.5	0.5	2.00	14.5
2001	Sacramento	5	5	36.2	.478	.000	.764	8.8	1.4	1.6	1.2	2.20	**21.2**
2003	Sacramento	6	6	33.3	**.537**	.000	**.912**	8.8	1.2	1.2	1.0	2.00	17.2
2004	Sacramento	6	6	34.0	.492	.000	.833	8.2	1.3	2.0	1.0	2.00	13.7
2005^{†}	Sacramento	8	8	30.8	.491	.000	.711	8.3	1.4	1.2	0.5	1.25	17.3
2006	Sacramento	**9**	**9**	26.3	.485	.000	.765	7.1	**1.8**	1.1	0.6	**1.11**	14.8
2007	Sacramento	3	3	23.7	.409	.000	.889	6.0	0.3	0.7	0.3	2.33	8.7
2008	Seattle	3	3	29.0	.214	.000	.875	6.3	1.7	**3.0**	**1.3**	1.67	4.3
Career	8 years, 2 teams	42	42	31.1	.484	.000	.786	8.0	1.4	1.4	0.8	1.69	15.0
