= Ticha Penicheiro =

Portuguese basketball player (born 1974)

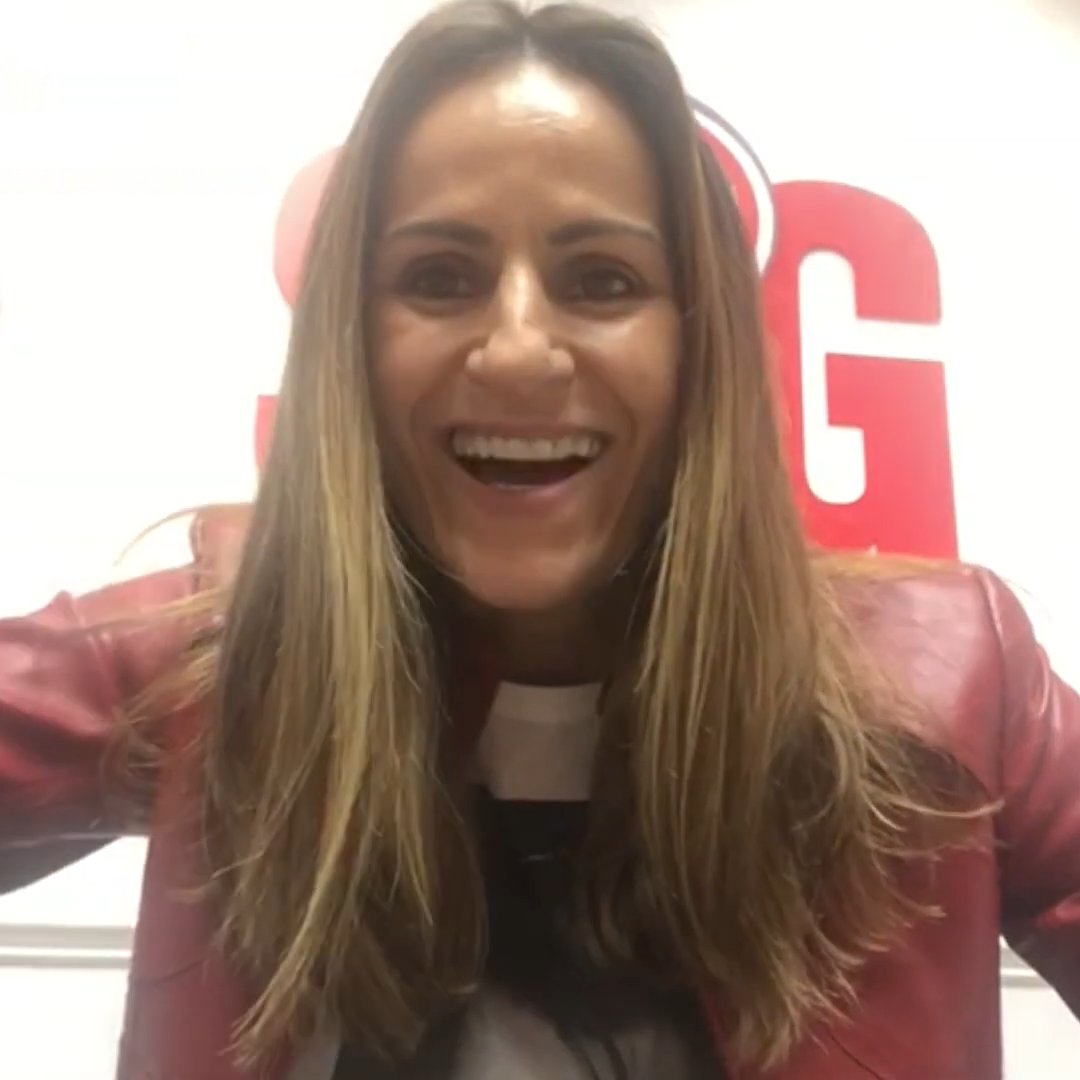
- Penicheiro in 2019

Personal information
- Born: September 18, 1974 (age 52) Figueira da Foz, Portugal
- Listed height: 5 ft 11 in (1.80 m)
- Listed weight: 146 lb (66 kg)

Career information
- College: Old Dominion (1994–1998)
- WNBA draft: 1998: 1st round, 2nd overall pick
- Drafted by: Sacramento Monarchs
- Playing career: 1998–2012
- Position: Point guard
- Number: 21

Career history
- 1998–2009: Sacramento Monarchs
- 2000–2001: Lotos Gdynia
- 2001–2002: Basket Parma
- 2003–2004: UMMC Ekaterinburg
- 2004–2005: Valenciennes
- 2005–2007: Spartak Moscow
- 2008: TTT Riga
- 2009–2010: Geas Basket
- 2010–2011: Los Angeles Sparks
- 2010: PF Umbertide
- 2010–2011: Sport Algés e Dafundo
- 2011: USK Praha
- 2012: Galatasaray
- 2012: Chicago Sky

Career highlights
- WNBA champion (2005); 4× WNBA All-Star (1999–2002); 2× All-WNBA First Team (1999–2000); All-WNBA Second Team (2001); All-Defensive First Team (2008); 7× WNBA assists leader (1998–2003, 2010); WNBA Peak Performer (2010); WNBA anniversary teams (15th, 20th, 25th); Polish National League champion (2001); Italian Cup winner (2002); French National League champion (2005); Russian National League champion (2007); Latvian National League champion (2008); Czech National League champion (2011); Turkish Cup winner (2012); EuroLeague champion (2007); EuroCup winner (2006); Wade Trophy (1998); 2× All-American – Kodak, USBWA (1997, 1998); 2× First-team All-American – AP (1997, 1998); 2× CAA Player of the Year (1996, 1997); 3× CAA All-Defensive Team (1996–1998); 4× First-team All-CAA (1995–1998); CAA Freshman of the Year (1995); CAA All-Freshman Team (1995)

Career WNBA statistics
- Points: 2,747 (6.1 ppg)
- Rebounds: 1,490 (3.3 rpg)
- Assists: 2,599 (5.7 apg)
- Stats at WNBA.com
- Stats at Basketball Reference
- Women's Basketball Hall of Fame
- FIBA Hall of Fame

Patrícia "Ticha" Nunes Penicheiro OIH (September 18, 1974) is a Portuguese sports agent and former basketball player. She played for the Sacramento Monarchs of the Women's National Basketball Association (WNBA) for most of her professional career. She was a four-time WNBA All-Star and a three-time All-WNBA selection. Regarded as one of the best point guards of all time, she ranks third all-time in career assists and led the league in assists seven times. She won a WNBA championship with the Monarchs in 2005. She was inducted into the Women's Basketball Hall of Fame in 2019.

== College years ==
Penicheiro was born and raised in Figueira da Foz, Portugal. Penicheiro played for several professional clubs through her teenage years, though she did not play at the senior level until after she starred for Old Dominion University college basketball team. She played at Old Dominion from 1994 to 1998 and helped lead the Lady Monarchs to the 1997 NCAA Championship game. In 1997, Penicheiro was named to the Final Four All-Tournament team. During her playing time at ODU, Penicheiro collected 1,304 career points and finished her career as ODU's all-time steal leader with 591. She is second all-time at ODU on the career assist list to another ODU great, Nancy Lieberman, with 939. She is the Colonial Athletic Association's all-time leader in both assists and steals.

Penicheiro is a two-time Kodak All-American, selected in 1997 and 1998. She became ODU's second winner of the prestigious Lifetime/Wade Trophy and the first international player to win the honor. A four-time All-CAA honoree, Ticha was named the conference's Player-of-the Year in 1995-96 and 1996-97 while also claiming the Rookie of the Year award in 1994–95. She graduated from Old Dominion in 1998 with degrees in communications and interdisciplinary studies, and was inducted into the ODU Sports Hall of Fame in 2006.

=== Old Dominion statistics ===
Legend
GP	Games played	GS	Games started	MPG	Minutes per game
FG%	Field goal percentage	3P%	3-point field goal percentage	FT%	Free throw percentage
RPG	Rebounds per game	APG	Assists per game	SPG	Steals per game
BPG	Blocks per game	PPG	Points per game	**Bold**	Career high

Year	Team	GP	Points	FG%	3P%	FT%	RPG	APG	SPG	BPG	PPG
1995	Old Dominion	33	283	.427	**.333**	.552	4.8	6.2	4.0	0.2	8.6
1996	Old Dominion	32	284	**.491**	.289	.671	4.6	7.1	4.3	0.3	8.9
1997	Old Dominion	**36**	**393**	.443	.310	**.649**	4.5	**7.5**	4.5	**0.3**	**10.9**
1998	Old Dominion	32	344	.408	.328	.629	**5.1**	7.5	**5.0**	0.2	10.8
Career		133	1,304	.440	.316	.628	4.7	7.1	4.4	0.3	9.8

== WNBA career ==
In 1998, Penicheiro joined the Sacramento Monarchs as a rookie, finishing third in the WNBA Rookie of the Year award voting. As a four-time WNBA All-Star player, she has twice tied the WNBA's record with 16 assists in a single game. In 1999, she was selected as a WNBA first-team player. This was also the year she set her WNBA high in points, with 27 against the Minnesota Lynx. In 2001, she was selected as a member of the WNBA's second team.

She had, as of June 19, 2003, 1,027 career points in the WNBA; for an average of 6.8 per game, 1,121 assists; for a total of 7.5 per game, 615 rebounds; for a total of 4.1 per game, and 322 steals, for a total of 2.15 per game.

Penicheiro retired as the all-time WNBA leader in total assists and assists per game, although both records have since been surpassed, respectively by Sue Bird and Courtney Vandersloot. Penicheiro also holds the WNBA single-game record for most steals with 10.

After the Monarchs franchise became defunct, Penicheiro signed with the Los Angeles Sparks. In 2011, her second year with the team, she was voted in by fans as one of the Top 15 players in the fifteen-year history of the WNBA.

In February 2012, Penicheiro signed with the Chicago Sky, but her season statistics were significantly diminished due to injuries, and on September 18, she announced that she would retire from the WNBA at the end of the 2012 season.

Penicheiro was inducted into the Virginia Sports Hall of Fame in 2014.

In 2016, Penicheiro was named in the WNBA Top 20@20, a list of the WNBA's top 20 players of all time in celebration of the league's twentieth anniversary. She was also named to the WNBA's 25th anniversary team, The W25, in 2021.

== WNBA career statistics ==
Legend
GP	Games played	GS	Games started	MPG	Minutes per game	RPG	Rebounds per game
APG	Assists per game	SPG	Steals per game	BPG	Blocks per game	PPG	Points per game
TO	Turnovers per game	FG%	Field-goal percentage	3P%	3-point field-goal percentage	FT%	Free-throw percentage
**Bold**	Career best	°	League leader

†	Denotes seasons in which Penicheiro won a WNBA championship

=== Regular season ===
Year	Team	GP	GS	MPG	FG%	3P%	FT%	RPG	APG	SPG	BPG	TO	PPG
1998	Sacramento	30	30	**36.0**°	.333	.233	.642	4.7	7.5°	2.2	0.1	3.87	6.3
1999	Sacramento	32	32	35.0	.320	.158	.664	**4.8**	7.1°	2.1	0.2	4.22	7.3
2000	Sacramento	30	30	31.2	.368	.200	.579	3.0	7.9°	2.3	0.2	2.37	6.9
2001	Sacramento	23	22	32.3	.339	.262	.766	3.7	7.5°	1.7	**0.4**	2.78	6.3
2002	Sacramento	24	24	35.5	.377	.250	.728	4.3	**8.0**°	**2.7**	0.0	2.88	8.5
2003	Sacramento	**34**	**34**	32.0	.302	.250	.579	3.5	6.7°	1.8	0.0	2.38	5.4
2004	Sacramento	32	32	29.4	.354	.338	.714	3.1	4.9	1.9	0.1	2.18	6.0
2005^{†}	Sacramento	**34**	33	27.3	.314	.195	.790	2.9	4.4	1.4	0.2	1.97	5.7
2006	Sacramento	**34**	**34**	24.9	.339	.194	.792	2.7	3.4	1.7	0.1	1.97	5.4
2007	Sacramento	32	32	23.7	.314	.214	.822	2.6	4.5	1.5	0.0	**1.88**	5.7
2008	Sacramento	33	33	25.9	.374	.286	.809	3.0	5.2	2.0	0.1	2.64	**8.6**
2009	Sacramento	30	28	24.1	.324	.111	.814	2.7	5.2	1.0	0.1	2.13	4.9
2010	Los Angeles	32	30	26.3	.410	.111	.819	4.0	6.9°	1.3	0.1	2.25	4.9
2011	Los Angeles	**34**	23	23.7	**.486**	**.417**	**.868**	2.8	4.8	0.8	0.1	2.09	6.0
2012	Chicago	18	5	12.8	.375	.200	.545	1.3	2.1	0.4	0.2	2.00	1.8
Career	15 years, 3 teams	453	422	28.2	.351	.248	.731	3.3	5.7	1.7	0.1	2.50	6.1

=== Postseason ===
Year	Team	GP	GS	MPG	FG%	3P%	FT%	RPG	APG	SPG	BPG	TO	PPG
1999	Sacramento	1	1	20.0	.200	.000	**1.000**	**4.0**	3.0	1.0	0.0	2.00	4.0
2000	Sacramento	2	2	**38.5**	.250	.500	.833	3.5	**7.0**°	2.0	0.0	3.00	8.0
2001	Sacramento	5	5	32.6	.250	.368	**1.000**	3.8	6.6°	0.6	**0.8**	1.80	6.2
2003	Sacramento	6	6	23.8	.333	.250	.875	2.3	3.0	1.0	0.5	**1.17**	4.2
2004	Sacramento	6	6	32.2	.222	.133	.688	3.3	5.3	**2.5**	0.3	3.17	4.2
2005^{†}	Sacramento	6	6	27.0	.323	.000	.800	**4.0**	5.2	1.0	0.2	2.33	5.3
2006	Sacramento	**9**	**9**	23.8	.294	.286	.647	2.3	3.8	1.2	0.0	1.22	5.0
2007	Sacramento	3	3	23.0	.273	.000	.600	2.3	5.0	2.3	0.0	3.33	6.0
2008	Sacramento	3	3	31.3	**.486**	**.750**	.667	**4.0**	6.3°	2.3	0.3	1.67	**13.7**
2010	Los Angeles	2	2	29.5	.455	.000	**1.000**	2.5	2.5	**2.5**	0.0	3.00	6.0
Career	10 years, 2 teams	43	43	27.7	.314	.288	.747	3.1	4.7	1.5	0.3	2.07	5.8

== International career ==
Penicheiro was a member of Portugal's national women's basketball team. She was also on the Spartak Moscow Region team, with Tina Thompson, Sue Bird, and Diana Taurasi. She played for Galatasaray Medical Park of Turkey in the 2011–12 season.

== Later career ==
When inducted into the Women's Basketball Hall of Fame in 2019, she was an active agent with about 30 clients, among them current WNBA players Kayla McBride and Courtney Vandersloot.

== Personal life ==
Penicheiro is a supporter of the Special Olympics. She also supports ovarian cancer research in honor of one of her close friends who was diagnosed with the disease. Besides her native Portuguese, she speaks English, Spanish and conversational Italian. Her father, João, is a former basketball player and now coaches her older brother, Paulo, who plays professionally in Portugal. She became an aunt when her brother and sister-in-law gave birth to their son João Miguel in 2009. Penicheiro also enjoys listening to R&B music and Hip-Hop and is an avid collector of watches and clothes.

On February 20, 2013, Penicheiro became an American citizen, taking the oath with 1,200 others at the Sacramento Convention Center.
