= 2000 WNBA season =

- League: Women's National Basketball Association
- Sport: Basketball
- Duration: May 29 - August 26, 2000
- Games: 32
- Teams: 16
- Total attendance: 2,322,822
- Average attendance: 9,074
- TV partner(s): ESPN, NBC, Lifetime

Draft
- Top draft pick: (Belgium) Ann Wauters
- Picked by: Cleveland Rockers

Regular season
- Top seed: Los Angeles Sparks
- Season MVP: (United States) Sheryl Swoopes (Houston)
- Top scorer: (United States) Sheryl Swoopes (Houston)

Playoffs
- Finals champions: Houston Comets
- Runners-up: New York Liberty
- Finals MVP: (United States) Cynthia Cooper-Dyke (Houston)

WNBA seasons
- ← 1999 2001 →

The 2000 WNBA season was the Women's National Basketball Association's fourth season. The 2000 season saw four expansion teams join the league, the Indiana Fever, Miami Sol, Portland Fire, and Seattle Storm. The 2000 WNBA expansion draft took place on December 15, 1999. The season ended with the Houston Comets winning their fourth WNBA championship.

== Regular season ==
=== Standings ===
Eastern Conference

Eastern Conference	W	L	PCT	Conf.	GB
New York Liberty ^{x}	20	12	.625	14–7	–
Cleveland Rockers ^{x}	17	15	.531	13–8	3.0
Orlando Miracle ^{x}	16	16	.500	13–8	4.0
Washington Mystics ^{x}	14	18	.438	13–8	6.0
Detroit Shock ^{o}	14	18	.438	10–11	6.0
Miami Sol ^{o}	13	19	.406	9–12	7.0
Indiana Fever ^{o}	9	23	.281	7–14	11.0
Charlotte Sting ^{o}	8	24	.250	5–16	12.0

Western Conference

Western Conference	W	L	PCT	Conf.	GB
Los Angeles Sparks ^{x}	28	4	.875	17–4	–
Houston Comets ^{x}	27	5	.844	17–4	1.0
Sacramento Monarchs ^{x}	21	11	.656	13–8	7.0
Phoenix Mercury ^{x}	20	12	.625	11–10	8.0
Utah Starzz ^{o}	18	14	.563	13–8	10.0
Minnesota Lynx ^{o}	15	17	.469	5–16	13.0
Portland Fire ^{o}	10	22	.313	4–17	18.0
Seattle Storm ^{o}	6	26	.188	4–17	22.0

Note: Teams with an "X" clinched playoff spots.

== Playoffs ==
There were 16 teams in the league. For the playoffs, the four teams with the best record in each conference were seeded one to four.

**Conference semifinals** Best-of-3
E1	**New York**	**2**
E4	Washington	0
**Eastern Conference**
E2	**Cleveland**	**2**
E3	Orlando	1
W1	**Los Angeles**	**2**
W4	Phoenix	0
**Western Conference**
W2	**Houston**	**2**
W3	Sacramento	0

**Conference finals** Best-of-3
E1	**New York**	**2**
E2	Cleveland	1
W1	Los Angeles	0
W2	**Houston**	**2**

**WNBA Finals**; Best-of-3
E1	New York	0
W2	**Houston**	**2**

- **Bold** – Series winner
- Italics – Team with home-court advantage

== Awards ==
=== Individual ===
Award		Winner	Team
Most Valuable Player (MVP)		Sheryl Swoopes	Houston Comets
Finals MVP		Cynthia Cooper	Houston Comets
Defensive Player of the Year		Sheryl Swoopes	Houston Comets
Most Improved Player		Tari Phillips	New York Liberty
Shooting Champions	**Field goal percentage**	Murriel Page	Washington Mystics
Shooting Champions	**Free throw percentage**	Jennifer Azzi	Utah Starzz
Rookie of the Year		Betty Lennox	Minnesota Lynx
Kim Perrot Sportsmanship Award		Suzie McConnell Serio	Cleveland Rockers
Entrepreneurial Achievement Award		Monica Lamb	Houston Comets
Coach of the Year		Michael Cooper	Los Angeles Sparks

=== Team ===
Award		Player	Team
All-WNBA	First Team	Sheryl Swoopes	Houston Comets
All-WNBA	First Team	Natalie Williams	Utah Starzz
All-WNBA	First Team	Lisa Leslie	Los Angeles Sparks
All-WNBA	First Team	Cynthia Cooper	Houston Comets
All-WNBA	First Team	Ticha Penicheiro	Sacramento Monarchs
All-WNBA	Second Team	Katie Smith	Minnesota Lynx
All-WNBA	Second Team	Tina Thompson	Houston Comets
All-WNBA	Second Team	Yolanda Griffith	Sacramento Monarchs
All-WNBA	Second Team	Teresa Weatherspoon	New York Liberty
All-WNBA	Second Team	Betty Lennox (tied)	Minnesota Lynx
All-WNBA	Second Team	Shannon Johnson (tied)	Orlando Miracle

=== Players of the Week ===
Week ending	Player	Team
June 5	Brandy Reed	Phoenix Mercury
June 12	Sheryl Swoopes	Houston Comets
June 19	Katie Smith	Minnesota Lynx
June 26	Lisa Leslie	Los Angeles Sparks
July 3	Tari Phillips	New York Liberty
July 10	Lisa Leslie (2)	Los Angeles Sparks
July 17	Natalie Williams	Utah Starzz
July 24	Lisa Leslie (3)	Los Angeles Sparks
July 31	Adrienne Goodson	Utah Starzz
August 7	Yolanda Griffith	Sacramento Monarchs

== Coaches ==
=== Eastern Conference ===
- Charlotte Sting: T.R. Dunn
- Cleveland Rockers: Dan Hughes
- Detroit Shock: Nancy Lieberman
- Indiana Fever: Anne Donovan
- Miami Sol: Ron Rothstein
- New York Liberty: Richie Adubato
- Orlando Miracle: Carolyn Peck
- Washington Mystics: Nancy Darsch and Darrell Walker

=== Western Conference ===
- Houston Comets: Van Chancellor
- Los Angeles Sparks: Michael Cooper
- Minnesota Lynx: Brian Agler
- Phoenix Mercury: Cheryl Miller
- Portland Fire: Linda Hargrove
- Sacramento Monarchs: Sonny Allen
- Seattle Storm: Lin Dunn
- Utah Starzz: Fred Williams
