= Las Vegas Aces =

Women's National Basketball Association team in Las Vegas, Nevada

- 2026 Las Vegas Aces season
- Conference: Western
- Leagues: WNBA
- Founded: 1997
- History: Utah Starzz; 1997–2002; San Antonio Silver Stars; 2003–2013; San Antonio Stars; 2014–2017; Las Vegas Aces; 2018–present
- Arena: Michelob Ultra Arena
- Location: Paradise, Nevada
- Team colors: Black, metallic silver, white
- Main sponsor: Ally Financial
- President: Nikki Fargas
- General manager: Vacant
- Head coach: Becky Hammon
- Assistants: Tyrone Ellis; Nola Henry; Charlene Thomas-Swinson; Larry Lewis
- Ownership: Mark Davis (majority); Tom Brady (minority)
- Championships: 3 (2022, 2023, 2025)
- Conference titles: 1 (2008) (Note: The WNBA awarded conference championships to the winners of the Conference Finals in the playoffs from 1998 to 2015.)
- Commissioner's Cup titles: 1 (2022)
- Retired numbers: 1 (25)
- Website: aces.wnba.com

The Las Vegas Aces are an American professional basketball team based in the Las Vegas metropolitan area. The Aces compete in the Women's National Basketball Association (WNBA) as a member of the Western Conference. The team plays its home games at Michelob Ultra Arena in the Mandalay Bay Resort and Casino, and is headquartered in Henderson, Nevada. The Aces won the 2022 WNBA Commissioner's Cup and WNBA championship. The Aces also won the 2023 WNBA championship, becoming the first team to win back-to-back championships since 2001 and 2002, when the Los Angeles Sparks completed that feat. The Aces won the 2025 WNBA Championship, securing their third championship in four years.

The team was founded in Salt Lake City, as the Utah Starzz before the league's inaugural 1997 season. It then moved to San Antonio, before the 2003 season and became the San Antonio Silver Stars, later shortened to the San Antonio Stars in 2014. The team relocated to Las Vegas before the 2018 season. The Aces, who are owned by Mark Davis, the owner of the NFL's Las Vegas Raiders, and Tom Brady, are one of two WNBA franchises alongside the Seattle Storm, who currently does not have an NBA team.

The team qualified for the WNBA playoffs in seven of their fifteen years in San Antonio. The franchise has been home to many high-quality players such as all-star point guard Becky Hammon, power-forward Sophia Young, former first-overall draft pick Ann Wauters, seven-foot-two-inch center Margo Dydek, two-time Sixth Woman of the Year Dearica Hamby, and five-time league MVP A'ja Wilson. The franchise has gone to the WNBA Finals five times: first in 2008, losing to Detroit, in 2020 losing to Seattle, in 2022 winning against Connecticut, in 2023 winning against New York, and in 2025 beating the Phoenix Mercury.

== History ==
=== The Utah Starzz years (1997–2002) ===
One of the eight original WNBA teams, the Utah Starzz (partially named after the old ABA team, the Utah Stars, but with the zz at the end like the Utah Jazz) never met the same success as their (former) counterpart in the NBA, the Utah Jazz. They held the distinction of having the worst record in the WNBA in 1997 and were the first team to select in the 1998 WNBA draft. With their selection, they picked 7 ft. 2 in. center Margo Dydek, who easily became the tallest player in WNBA history. Unfortunately, the pickup of Dydek did little to help their cause and they again finished near the bottom of the league in the 1998 & 1999 seasons. The Starzz finally posted a winning record in 2000, but did not make the playoffs. In 2001, the Utah Starzz made it to the playoffs for the first time, but they were quickly swept in the first round by the Sacramento Monarchs. In 2002, the Starzz made it to the playoffs again, and this time beat the Houston Comets in the Western Conference Semifinals 2 games to 1. Their playoff run ended in the Western Finals, however, as they were swept aside by the eventual champs, the Los Angeles Sparks.

=== The San Antonio Silver Stars/Stars years (2002–2017) ===
When the NBA divested itself of all of its WNBA franchises at the end of the 2002 season, the Utah Jazz ownership did not wish to retain ownership of the Starzz. The Starzz then looked for local Utah potential buyers, but none were found, leaving the franchise with the choices of either being sold to out-of-town investor(s) or folding. The Starzz avoided folding when the franchise was sold to Peter Holt (the owner of the NBA's San Antonio Spurs) and relocated to San Antonio. The team's name was changed to the San Antonio Silver Stars and team colors to the silver and black motif used by the Spurs.

For the first four seasons (2003–2006) after moving to San Antonio, the franchise was unable to change its old losing trend and did not make the playoffs. The 2007 season brought a lot of change for the Silver Stars. They acquired stars Becky Hammon, Ruth Riley, and Sandora Irvin in trades, selected Helen Darling in Charlotte Sting's dispersal draft, drafted Camille Little in the second round, signed Erin Buescher during the off-season, and retained key players, such as Marie Ferdinand-Harris, Vickie Johnson, Shanna Crossley, Kendra Wecker, and Sophia Young. The new-look Silver Stars became an instant contender in the Western Conference. On August 4, 2007, the Silver Stars clinched their first playoff berth since the franchise relocated to San Antonio in 2003. In the first round, the Silver Stars were matched up against the Sacramento Monarchs. After losing game 1 in Sacramento, the Silver Stars would win games 2 and 3 to advance to the Western Finals. The Silver Stars faced off against a strong Phoenix Mercury team, which had the number one seed in the Western Conference. On September 1, 2007, the Silver Stars' season came to an end after the Stars lost Game 2 98–92 in Phoenix.

Heading into 2008, the Silver Stars were regarded as a premiere contender and did not disappoint. After an average start, the Stars seized control of the Western Conference and rode to the best record in the West, and the first seed in the playoffs. In the WNBA Finals, the Silver Stars faced the Detroit Shock, who were making their third WNBA Finals appearance in a row. In Game 1 at home, the Silver Stars fell behind early, but would tie the game at 69 with 2:15 left in the 4th quarter. But from there the Shock took control once again and won the game 77–69. The 2010 season was not much different for the Stars. They finished with an unimpressive 14–20 record but sneaked into the third seed of the playoffs in a below-average Western Conference. The Silver Stars were swept in the first round of the playoffs by Phoenix and it was clear that some changes were needed. In the 2012 playoffs, the Silver Stars lost in the first round to the Los Angeles Sparks. The team would miss the playoffs in 2013. In the 2014 playoffs, the Stars would lose in the first round to the Minnesota Lynx.

=== Relocation to Las Vegas ===
The club's first Las Vegas-era logo, used from 2017 to 2024.

After Spurs Sports & Entertainment decided to put the team up for sale, following the 2017 season, it became apparent the team would be on the move. The NBA and WNBA approved the sale of the Stars to MGM Resorts on October 17, 2017, with the intention of relocating the team to Las Vegas and playing at the Michelob Ultra Arena starting in the 2018 season. On December 11, 2017, at a press conference inside the House of Blues at Mandalay Bay in Las Vegas, the team name was officially announced as the Las Vegas Aces. They received the first pick in the 2018 WNBA Draft, and picked South Carolina's A'ja Wilson.

On January 14, 2021, Mark Davis, owner of the Las Vegas Raiders, agreed to purchase the team from MGM. The purchase was approved by the league on February 12, 2021. Shortly after the purchase of the team by Davis, ground was broken on a training facility for the Aces in Henderson next to the Raiders facility. The 50,000 square foot facility, the first complex built solely for the use of a WNBA team houses the Aces’ practice facility, offices, training room, weight room, hydrotherapy space, physical therapy area, locker rooms, a lecture hall, player and alumni lounges, and an on-site day care center and was completed in April 2023. In May 2021, Davis hired former LSU Lady Tigers basketball head coach Nikki Fargas as team president. On December 31, 2021, Becky Hammon was hired as head coach in a deal that made her the highest paid coach in the WNBA. During the 2022 season, the Aces defeated the Phoenix Mercury in round 1 and the Seattle Storm in the semifinals before defeating the Connecticut Sun in the 2022 WNBA Finals in 4 games to win the franchise's first championship and the first professional sports championship for Las Vegas.

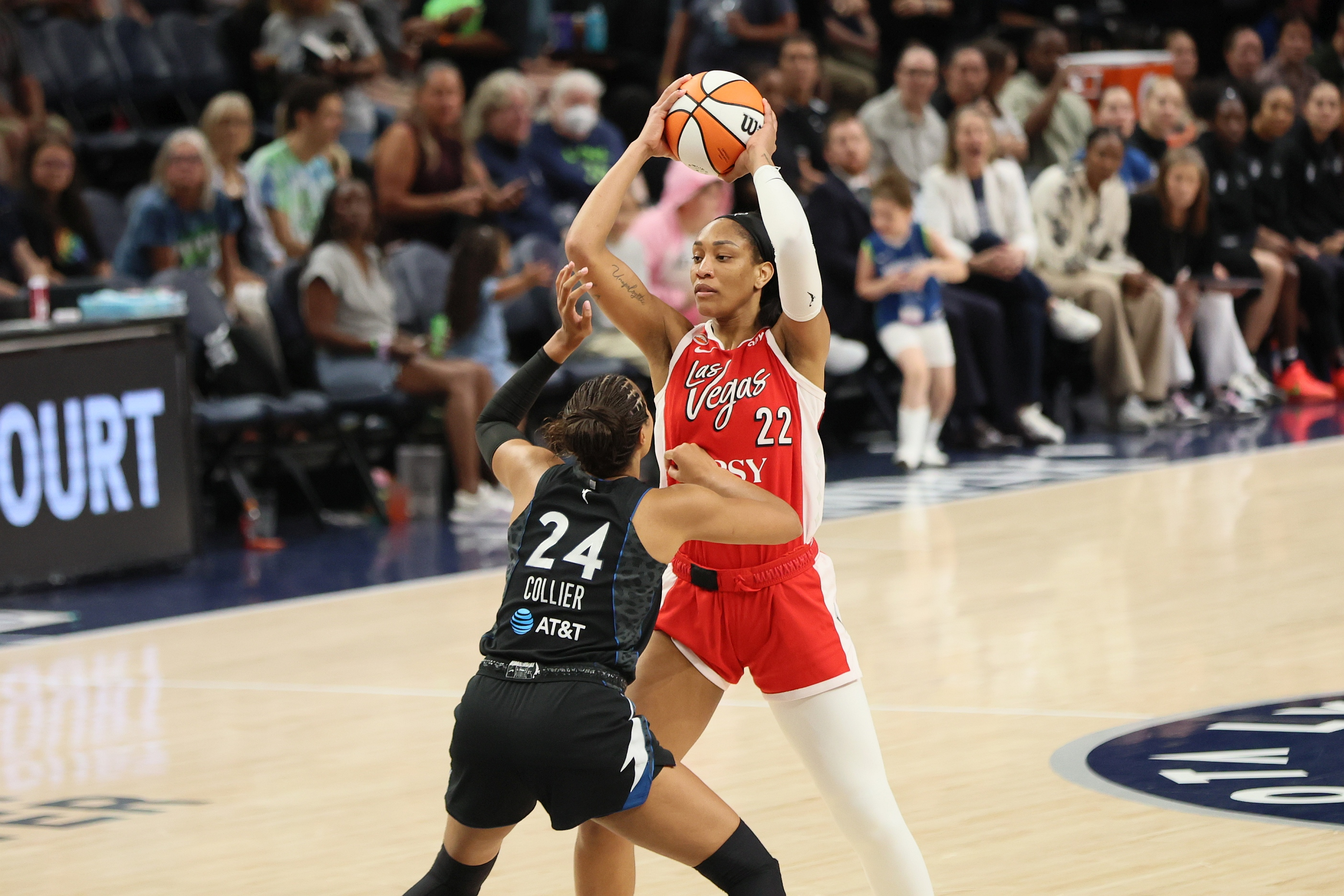
A'ja Wilson, a five-time MVP and three-time champion with the Aces, during a game against the Minnesota Lynx in August 2026.

On 23 March 2023, it was announced that former NFL quarterback Tom Brady had purchased a minority stake in the team. The Aces would go on to defend their WNBA Championship against the New York Liberty.

On March 6, 2024, the Aces debuted new uniforms and a new silver and black color scheme matching that of Davis's other team the Raiders. A day later the team announced a season ticket sell out for the 2024 season, the first time in league history a team has sold out their season tickets.

On May 17, 2024, the Las Vegas Convention and Visitors Authority (LVCVA) announced that they would be gifting each player on the 2024 Aces roster a $100,000 sponsorship. This sponsorship is independent of the Aces organization as per the WNBA's collective bargaining agreement. On May 18, 2024, the WNBA opened an investigation into these sponsorships.

The Las Vegas Aces won their third WNBA National Championship in four years on 10 October 2025, sweeping the Phoenix Mercury 4-0, closing out the last game in Phoenix, 97 to 86.

== Season-by-season records ==
Season	Team	Conference		Regular season			Playoff Results	Head coach
Season	Team	Conference		W	L	PCT	Playoff Results	Head coach
Utah Starzz
1997	1997	West	4th	7	21	.250	Did not qualify	Denise Taylor
1998	1998	West	5th	8	22	.267	Did not qualify	D. Taylor (6–13); F. Layden (2–9)
1999	1999	West	6th	15	17	.469	Did not qualify	F. Layden (2–2); F. Williams (13–15)
2000	2000	West	5th	18	14	.563	Did not qualify	Fred Williams
2001	2001	West	3rd	19	13	.594	Lost Conference Semifinals (Sacramento, 0–2)	F. Williams (5–8); C. Harvey (14–5)
2002	2002	West	3rd	20	12	.625	Won Conference Semifinals (Houston, 2–1); Lost Conference Finals (Los Angeles, 0–2)	Candi Harvey
San Antonio Silver Stars
2003	2003	West	6th	12	22	.353	Did not qualify	C. Harvey (6–16); S. Dailey (6–6)
2004	2004	West	7th	9	25	.265	Did not qualify	D. Brown (6–18); S. Dailey (3–7)
2005	2005	West	7th	7	27	.206	Did not qualify	Dan Hughes
2006	2006	West	6th	13	21	.382	Did not qualify	Dan Hughes
2007	2007	West	2nd	20	14	.588	Won Conference Semifinals (Sacramento, 2–1); Lost Conference Finals (Phoenix, 0–2)	Dan Hughes
2008	2008	West	1st	24	10	.706	Won Conference Semifinals (Sacramento, 2–1); Won Conference Finals (Los Angeles, 2–1); Lost WNBA Finals (Detroit, 0–3)	Dan Hughes
2009	2009	West	4th	15	19	.441	Lost Conference Semifinals (Phoenix, 1–2)	Dan Hughes
2010	2010	West	3rd	14	20	.412	Lost Conference Semifinals (Phoenix, 0–2)	Sandy Brondello
2011	2011	West	4th	18	16	.529	Lost Conference Semifinals (Minnesota, 1–2)	Dan Hughes
2012	2012	West	3rd	21	13	.618	Lost Conference Semifinals (Los Angeles, 0–2)	Dan Hughes
2013	2013	West	5th	12	22	.353	Did not qualify	Dan Hughes
San Antonio Stars
2014	2014	West	3rd	16	18	.471	Lost Conference Semifinals (Minnesota, 0–2)	Dan Hughes
2015	2015	West	6th	8	26	.235	Did not qualify	Dan Hughes
2016	2016	West	6th	7	27	.206	Did not qualify	Dan Hughes
2017	2017	West	12th	8	26	.235	Did not qualify	Vickie Johnson
Las Vegas Aces
2018	2018	West	9th	14	20	.412	Did not qualify	Bill Laimbeer
2019	2019	West	4th	21	13	.618	Won Second Round (Chicago, 1–0); Lost Semifinals (Washington, 1–3)	Bill Laimbeer
2020	2020	West	1st	18	4	.818	Won Semifinals (Connecticut, 3–2); Lost WNBA Finals (Seattle, 0–3)	Bill Laimbeer
2021	2021	West	1st	24	8	.750	Lost Semifinals (Phoenix, 2–3)	Bill Laimbeer
2022	2022	West	1st	26	10	.722	Won First Round (Phoenix, 2–0); Won Semifinals (Seattle, 3–1); Won WNBA Finals (Connecticut, 3–1)	Becky Hammon
2023	2023	West	1st	34	6	.850	Won First Round (Chicago, 2–0); Won Semifinals (Dallas, 3–0); Won WNBA Finals (New York, 3–1)	Becky Hammon
2024	2024	West	2nd	27	13	.675	Won First Round (Seattle, 2–0); Lost Semifinals (New York, 1–3)	Becky Hammon
2025	2025	West	2nd	30	14	.682	Won First Round (Seattle, 2–1); Won Semifinals (Indiana, 3–2); Won WNBA Finals (Phoenix, 4–0)	Becky Hammon
2026	2026	West	3rd	31	13	.705	Won First Round (Indiana, 2–1) Lost Semifinals (Golden State, 0–3)	Becky Hammon
Regular season				516	506	.505	1 Conference Championship	
Playoffs				47	47	.500	3 WNBA Championships	

== Players ==
=== Current roster ===
Las Vegas Aces roster
Players
Coaches

Pos.	No.	Nat.	Name	Height	Weight	DOB	From	Yrs
F	2	(United States)	Barker, Janiah (injured)	6' 4" (1.93m)	185 lb (84kg)	2003-11-08	Tennessee	R
F	1	(United States)	Bell, Kierstan	6' 1" (1.85m)	176 lb (80kg)	2000-03-16	Florida Gulf Coast	4
C	20	(United States)	Brown, Kalani	6' 7" (2.01m)	245 lb (111kg)	1997-03-21	Baylor	6
G	11	(United States)	Evans, Dana	5' 6" (1.68m)	145 lb (66kg)	1998-08-01	Louisville	5
G	12	(United States)	Gray, Chelsea	5' 11" (1.8m)	170 lb (77kg)	1992-10-08	Duke	11
G	5	(United States)	Latson, Ta'Niya	5' 9" (1.75m)		2003-12-26	South Carolina	R
G	24	(United States)	Loyd, Jewell	5' 11" (1.8m)	175 lb (79kg)	1993-10-05	Notre Dame	11
F	32	(United States)	Parker-Tyus, Cheyenne	6' 4" (1.93m)	193 lb (88kg)	1992-08-22	Middle Tennessee	11
G/F	13	(United States)	Pissott, Justine	6' 4" (1.93m)	175 lb (79kg)	2004-02-04	Vanderbilt	R
F	3	(United States)	Smith, NaLyssa (injured)	6' 4" (1.93m)	185 lb (84kg)	2000-08-08	Baylor	4
F	7	(Australia)	Talbot, Stephanie	6' 2" (1.88m)	192 lb (87kg)	1994-06-15	Australia	7
F/C	21	(United States)	Turner, Brianna	6' 3" (1.91m)	175 lb (79kg)	1996-07-05	Notre Dame	7
C	22	(United States)	Wilson, A'ja	6' 4" (1.93m)	195 lb (88kg)	1996-08-08	South Carolina	8
G	18	(Japan)	Yamamoto, Mai	5' 5" (1.65m)	128 lb (58kg)	1999-10-23	Oka Gakuen (Nagoya, Japan)	R
G	0	(United States)	Young, Jackie	6' 0" (1.83m)	165 lb (75kg)	1997-09-16	Notre Dame	7

Head coach
(United States) Becky Hammon (Colorado State)
Assistant coaches
(United States) Tyrone Ellis (Southern Nazarene)
(United States) Nola Henry (College of Charleston)
(United States) Larry Lewis (Morehouse)
(United States) Charlene Thomas-Swinson (Auburn)
Athletic trainer
(United States) Bryson Creer (BYU)

Legend

- (C) Team captain
- (DP) Unsigned draft pick
- (FA) Free agent
- (S) Suspended
- Injured

WNBA roster page

East
ATL
CHI
CON
IND
NY
TOR
WAS
West
DAL
GS
LV
LA
MIN
PHO
POR
SEA

=== Former players ===
- Danielle Adams (2011–2015)
- Chantelle Anderson (2005–2007)
- Jayne Appel (2010–2016)
- Jennifer Azzi (2000–2003)
- Elena Baranova (1997–1999)
- Emma Cannon
- Helen Darling (2007–2010)
- Margo Dydek (1998–2004)
- Shyra Ely (2005–2006)
- Liz Cambage (2019-2021)
- Sydney Colson (2022–2024), now a member of the Indiana Fever
- Marie Ferdinand-Harris (2001–2007)
- Adrienne Goodson (1999–2004)
- Dearica Hamby (2015–2022), now a member of the Los Angeles Sparks
- Becky Hammon (2007–2014), now head coach of the Las Vegas Aces
- Tiffany Hayes (2024), now a member of the Golden State Valkyries
- Dena Head (1997–1998)
- Chamique Holdsclaw (2010)
- Shannon "Pee Wee" Johnson (2004–2006)
- Shenise Johnson (2012–2014)
- Vickie Johnson (2006–2009), now an assistant coach for the Atlanta Dream
- Kate Martin (2024), now a member of the Los Angeles Sparks
- Kayla McBride (2014–2020), now a member of the Minnesota Lynx
- DeLisha Milton-Jones (2013), now the head coach for the Old Dominion University women's basketball team
- Wendy Palmer-Daniel (1997–1999, 2005)
- Jia Perkins (2011–2015)
- Erin Buescher Perperoglou (2007–2009)
- Theresa Plaisance (2022)
- Kelsey Plum (2017–2024), now a member of the Los Angeles Sparks
- Semeka Randall (2002–2004)
- Ruth Riley (2007–2011)
- Danielle Robinson (2011–2016, 2020)
- Sugar Rodgers (2019–2020), now an assistant coach for William & Mary Tribe women's basketball & the Golden State Valkyries
- Olympia Scott (1998–1999)
- Michelle Snow (2010)
- Kate Starbird (2000–2002)
- LaToya Thomas (2004–2006)
- Ann Wauters (2008–2009)
- Natalie Williams (1999–2002)
- Sophia Young (2006–2015)
- Shanna Zolman (2006–2007, 2009)
- Tausha Mills (2003)
- Alysha Clark (2023-2024), now a member of the Washington Mystics

=== Retired numbers ===
Las Vegas Aces retired numbers
No.	Player	Position	Tenure	Ref
25	Becky Hammon (Note: Number retired by San Antonio Stars before they became the Las Vegas Aces.)	G	2007–14	

== Coaches and staff ==
=== Owners ===
- Larry H. Miller, owner of the Utah Jazz (1997–2002)
- Peter Holt, owner of the San Antonio Spurs (2003–2017)
- MGM Resorts International (2017–2021)
- Mark Davis (2021–2023)
- Mark Davis and Tom Brady (2023–present)

=== Head coaches ===
Las Vegas Aces franchise head coaches
Name	Start	End	Seasons	Regular season				Playoffs			
Name	Start	End	Seasons	W	L	PCT	G	W	L	PCT	G
Denise Taylor	April 19, 1997	July 27, 1998	2	13	34	.277	47	0	0	.000	0
Frank Layden	July 27, 1998	June 21, 1999	2	4	11	.267	15	0	0	.000	0
Fred Williams	June 21, 1999	July 6, 2001	3	36	37	.493	73	0	0	.000	0
Candi Harvey	July 6, 2001	July 26, 2003	3	40	33	.548	73	2	5	.286	7
Shell Dailey	July 26, 2003	October 30, 2003	1	6	6	.500	12	0	0	.000	0
Dee Brown	October 30, 2003	July 30, 2004	1	6	18	.250	24	0	0	.000	0
Shell Dailey	August 10, 2004	end of 2004	1	3	7	.300	10	0	0	.000	0
Shell Dailey	Total		2	9	13	.409	22	0	0	.000	0
Dan Hughes	January 4, 2005	February 25, 2010	5	79	91	.465	170	7	10	.412	17
Sandy Brondello	February 25, 2010	September 27, 2010	1	14	20	.412	34	0	2	.000	2
Dan Hughes	January 28, 2011	end of 2016	6	82	122	.402	204	1	6	.143	7
Dan Hughes	Total		11	161	213	.430	374	8	16	.333	24
Vickie Johnson	December 22, 2016	October 17, 2017	1	8	26	.235	34	0	0	.000	0
Bill Laimbeer	October 17, 2017	December 31, 2021	4	77	45	.631	122	7	11	.389	18
Becky Hammon	December 31, 2021	Present	4	117	43	.731	160	28	9	.757	37

=== General managers ===
- Jay Francis (1997–2004)
- Dan Hughes (2005–2015)
- Ruth Riley (2016–2017)
- Bill Laimbeer (2018)
- Dan Padover (2019–2021)
- Natalie Williams (2022–2024)

=== Assistant coaches ===
- Greg Williams (1997)
- Fred Williams (1998)
- Michael Layden (1999)
- Candi Harvey (1999–2000)
- Richard Smith (1999–2000)
- Tammy Reiss (2001–2003)
- Bobby Morse (2002)
- Shell Dailey (2003–2004)
- Vonn Read (2004)
- Brian Agler (2005–2007)
- Sandy Brondello (2005–2009)
- Vanessa Nygaard (2008, 2021)
- Olaf Lange (2008–2010)
- Vickie Johnson (2011–2016, 2018–2020)
- Steve Shuman (2011–2012)
- James Wade (2013–2016)
- Joi Williams (2017)
- Latricia Trammell (2017)
- Kelly Schumacher (2018–2020)
- Tanisha Wright (2020–2021)
- Sugar Rodgers (2021)
- Natalie Nakase (2022–2024)
- Tyler Marsh (2022–2024)
- Charlene Thomas-Swinson (2022–present)
- Tyrone Ellis (2025–present)
- Larry Lewis (2025–present)
- Nola Henry (2026–present)

== Statistics ==
Las Vegas Aces franchise statistics
1990s
Season	Individual			Team vs Opponents		
Season	PPG	RPG	APG	PPG	RPG	FG%
1997	W. Palmer (15.8)	W. Palmer (8.0)	T. Reiss (3.1)	64.6 vs 75.1	33.9 vs 36.0	.374 vs .429
1998	W. Palmer (13.5)	E. Baranova (9.3)	C. Tremitiere (3.6)	69.8 vs 76.5	33.4 vs 34.0	.423 vs .428
1999	N. Williams (18.0)	N. Williams (9.2)	D. Black (5.0)	74.0 vs 77.1	33.2 vs 30.4	.434 vs .438
2000s
Season	Individual			Team vs Opponents		
Season	PPG	RPG	APG	PPG	RPG	FG%
2000	N. Williams (18.7)	N. Williams (11.6)	K. Hlede (3.0)	75.4 vs 75.2	33.8 vs 28.5	.453 vs .438
2001	N. Williams (14.2)	N. Williams (9.9)	J. Azzi (5.3)	69.0 vs 68.5	33.4 vs 30.4	.439 vs .399
2002	A. Goodson (15.7)	M. Dydek (8.7)	J. Azzi (4.9)	75.6 vs 73.3	33.4 vs 31.4	.441 vs .412
2003	M. Ferdinand (13.8)	M. Dydek (7.4)	J. Azzi (3.3)	65.1 vs 71.4	33.7 vs 34.5	.383 vs .398
2004	L. Thomas (14.2)	A. Goodson (6.9)	S. Johnson (4.4)	64.4 vs 69.5	29.5 vs 30.4	.419 vs .443
2005	M. Ferdinand (12.5)	W. Palmer (5.7)	S. Johnson (4.6)	63.0 vs 70.6	27.8 vs 31.0	.417 vs .436
2006	S. Young (12.0)	S. Young (7.6)	S. Johnson (3.7)	74.2 vs 76.6	34.4 vs 36.4	.406 vs .431
2007	B. Hammon (18.8)	E. Buescher (6.1)	B. Hammon (5.0)	74.0 vs 73.1	32.0 vs 33.4	.424 vs .423
2008	B. Hammon (17.6)	A. Wauters (7.5)	B. Hammon (4.9)	74.9 vs 71.1	32.1 vs 35.5	.433 vs .398
2009	B. Hammon (19.5)	S. Young (6.5)	B. Hammon (5.0)	76.9 vs 78.3	30.9 vs 34.9	.427 vs .439
2010s
Season	Individual			Team vs Opponents		
Season	PPG	RPG	APG	PPG	RPG	FG%
2010	S. Young (15.3)	M. Snow (6.2)	B. Hammon (5.4)	76.8 vs 80.1	30.1 vs 33.1	.461 vs .467
2011	B. Hammon (15.9)	S. Young (6.4)	B. Hammon (5.8)	77.6 vs 75.5	31.3 vs 37.0	.430 vs .427
2012	S. Young (16.3)	S. Young (7.2)	B. Hammon (5.3)	82.1 vs 76.9	33.2 vs 34.9	.445 vs .432
2013	D. Adams (14.4)	J. Appel (8.9)	D. Robinson (6.7)	72.1 vs 77.9	32.1 vs 36.5	.400 vs .455
2014	K. McBride (13.0)	J. Appel (7.9)	D. Robinson (5.3)	77.8 vs 79.6	31.7 vs 34.1	.430 vs .474
2015	K. McBride (13.8)	J. Appel (6.4)	D. Robinson (5.0)	68.1 vs 76.7	32.6 vs 35.6	.390 vs .459
2016	M. Jefferson (13.9)	J. Appel (5.4)	M. Jefferson (4.2)	72.0 vs 80.2	31.9 vs 35.7	.405 vs .438
2017	M. McBride (15.4)	I. Harrison (6.4)	M. Jefferson (4.4)	74.4 vs 81.3	33.3 vs 24.1	.429 vs .452
2018	A. Wilson (20.7)	A. Wilson (8.0)	K. Plum (4.0)	84.4 vs 87.0	36.9 vs 35.5	.442 vs .449
2019	A. Wilson (16.5)	L. Cambage (8.2)	J. Young (4.5)	82.2 vs 78.8	38.8 vs 35.1	.427 vs .399
2020s
Season	Individual			Team vs Opponents		
Season	PPG	RPG	APG	PPG	RPG	FG%
2020	A. Wilson (20.5)	A. Wilson (8.5)	D. Robinson (3.3)	88.7 vs 80.1	37.4 vs 32.8	.476 vs .431
2021	A. Wilson (18.3)	A. Wilson (9.3)	C. Gray (5.9)	89.3 vs 80.2	38.7 vs 34.9	.472 vs .415
2022	K. Plum (20.2)	A. Wilson (9.4)	C. Gray (6.1)	90.4 vs 84.1	35.3 vs 36.2	.460 vs .437
2023	A. Wilson (22.8)	A. Wilson (9.5)	C. Gray (7.3)	92.8 vs 80.3	34.8 vs 34.3	.486 vs .426
2024	A. Wilson (26.9)	A. Wilson (11.9)	J. Young (5.3)	86.4 vs 80.9	34.1 vs 35.5	.454 vs .433
2025	A. Wilson (23.4)	A. Wilson (10.2)	C. Gray (5.4)	83.6 vs 80.7	33.5 vs 35.0	.439 vs .436

== Media coverage ==
The television rights for the Aces are held by KMCC, owned by the E. W. Scripps Company. Until 2025, the television rights were initially held by KVVU-TV, owned by Gray Television. A minimum of ten games aired on KVVU, with the remaining games on Silver State Sports and Entertainment Network, a subchannel of KVVU. KVVU also broadcast a 30-minute weekly show on the Aces.

Some Aces games are broadcast nationally on ESPN, ESPN2, ABC (KTNV-TV), Ion Television(KMCC-DT2), Prime Video, CBS (KLAS-TV), NBC(KSNV), Amazon Prime Video, USA, NBCSN, NBA TV.

On radio, Aces games are broadcast locally on KWWN ESPN Las Vegas.

== All-time notes ==
=== Regular season attendance ===
- A sellout for a basketball game at Delta Center (Utah) is 19,911.
- A sellout for a basketball game at AT&T Center (San Antonio) (2003–2014, 2016–2017) is 18,418.
- A sellout for a basketball game at Freeman Coliseum (San Antonio) (2015) is 9,800.
- A sellout for a basketball game at Michelob Ultra Arena (Las Vegas) (2018–present) is 12,000.

Regular season all-time attendance
Utah Starzz
Year	Average	High	Low	Sellouts	Total for year	WNBA game average
1997	7,611 (8th)	9,858	5,783	0	106,555	9,669
1998	8,104 (8th)	15,657	5,761	0	121,560	10,869
1999	7,544 (11th)	14,783	4,648	0	120,706	10,207
2000	6,420 (15th)	8,803	4,934	0	102,722	9,074
2001	6,907 (13th)	11,519	4,503	0	110,507	9,105
2002	7,420 (11th)	12,578	5,103	0	118,720	9,228
San Antonio Stars
Year	Average	High	Low	Sellouts	Total for year	WNBA game average
2003	10,384 (3rd)	15,593	7,692	0	176,526	8,826
2004	8,320 (6th)	10,506	5,764	0	141,444	8,589
2005	7,944 (8th)	9,772	5,508	0	135,054	8,172
2006	7,386 (10th)	10,634	5,998	0	125,564	7,476
2007	7,569 (10th)	10,262	4,070	0	128,680	7,819
2008	7,984 (9th)	16,255	5,705	0	135,722	7,948
2009	7,527 (10th)	10,572	4,723	0	127,957	8,029
2010	8,041 (7th)	12,414	4,924	0	136,696	7,834
2011	8,751 (4th)	14,797	6,358	0	148,767	7,954
2012	7,850 (4th)	15,184	5,023	0	133,454	7,452
2013	7,914 (5th)	12,086	5,390	0	134,532	7,531
2014	7,719 (7th)	12,659	5,012	0	131,226	7,578
2015	4,751 (12th)	9,080	1,738	0	80,766	7,184
2016	6,385 (9th)	11,171	3,319	0	108,551	7,655
2017	6,386 (10th)	9,621	3,210	0	108,562	7,716
Las Vegas Aces
Year	Average	High	Low	Sellouts	Total for year	WNBA game average
2018	5,208 (9th)	7,662	4,432	0	88,536	6,721
2019	4,687 (9th)	8,470	2,747	0	79,673	6,535
2020	Due to the COVID-19 pandemic, the season was played in Bradenton, Florida without fans.					
2021	2,943 (4th)	5,663	1,954	0	29,434	2,636
2022	5,607 (7th)	10,015	2,536	0	101,747	5,679
2023	9,551 (1st)	17,406 (Note: The Aces played one 2023 home game at T-Mobile Arena.)	7,970	0	191,024	6,615
2024	11,283 (3rd)	20,366 (Note: The Aces played two 2024 home games at T-Mobile Arena.)	10,286	20	225,657	9,807
2025	11,553 (6th)	18,547 (Note: The Aces played four 2025 home games at T-Mobile Arena.)	10,407	1	219,068	10,986

=== Draft picks ===
- 1997 Elite: Dena Head (1), Wendy Palmer (9)
- 1997: Tammi Reiss (5), Jessie Hicks (12), Reagan Scott (21), Kim Williams (28)
- 1998: Margo Dydek (1), Olympia Scott (11), LaTonya Johnson (21), Tricia Bader (31)
- 1999: Natalie Williams (3), Debbie Black (15), Adrienne Goodson (27), Dalma Ivanyi (39)
- 2000: Naomi Mulitauaopele (12), Stacy Frese (35), Kristen Rasmussen (51)
- 2001: Marie Ferdinand (8), Michaela Pavlickova (24), Shea Ralph (40), Cara Conseugra (56)
- 2002: Danielle Crockrom (11), LaNeishea Caufield (14), Andrea Gardner (27), Edmarie Lumbsley (43), Jacklyn Winfield (59)
- 2003 Miami/Portland Dispersal Draft: LaQuanda Barksdale (12)
- 2003: Coretta Brown (11), Ke-Ke Tardy (25), Brooke Armistead (40)
- 2004 Cleveland Dispersal Draft: LaToya Thomas (3)
- 2004: Cindy Dallas (21), Toccara Williams (34)
- 2005: Kendra Wecker (4), Shyra Ely (14), Catherine Kraayeveld (27)
- 2006: Sophia Young (4), Shanna Crossley (16), Khara Smith (30)
- 2007 Charlotte Dispersal Draft: Helen Darling (4)
- 2007: Camille Little (17), Nare Diawara (30)
- 2008: Chioma Nnamaka (21), Alex Anderson (39)
- 2009 Houston Dispersal Draft: selection waived
- 2009: Megan Frazee (14), Sonja Petrovic (26), Candyce Bingham (39)
- 2010 Sacramento Dispersal Draft: Laura Harper (5)
- 2010: Jayne Appel (5), Alysha Clark (17), Alexis Rack (29)
- 2011: Danielle Robinson (6), Danielle Adams (20), Porsha Phillips (30)
- 2012: Shenise Johnson (5)
- 2013: Kayla Alexander (8), Davellyn Whyte (16), Diandra Tchatchouang (20), Whitney Hand (32)
- 2014: Kayla McBride (3), Astou Ndour (16), Bri Kulas (28)
- 2015: Dearica Hamby (6), Dragana Stanković (30), Nikki Moody (33)
- 2016: Moriah Jefferson (2), Brittney Martin (25)
- 2017: Kelsey Plum (1), Nia Coffey (5), Schaquilla Nunn (25)
- 2018: A'ja Wilson (1), Jaime Nared (13), Raigyne Louis (25), Jill Barta (32)
- 2019: Jackie Young (1)
- 2020: Lauren Manis (33)
- 2021: Iliana Rupert (12), Destiny Slocum (14), Kionna Jeter (36)
- 2022: Mya Hollingshed (8), Kierstan Bell (11), Kayla Pointer (13), Aisha Sheppard (23), Faustine Aifuwa (35)
- 2023: Brittney Davis (36)
- 2024: Dyaisha Fair (16), Kate Martin (18), Elizabeth Kitley (24), Angel Jackson (36)
- 2025: Aaliyah Nye (13), Harmoni Turner (35)

=== Trades ===
- May 5, 1998: The Starzz traded Lady Harmon to the Sacramento Monarchs in exchange for Chantel Tremitiere.
- May 8, 1998: The Starzz traded Karen Booker to the Houston Comets in exchange for Fran Harris.
- July 29, 1999: The Starzz traded Wendy Palmer and Olympia Scott-Richardson to the Detroit Shock in exchange for Korie Hlede and Cindy Brown.
- April 24, 2000: The Starzz traded the third and eighth picks in the 2000 Draft to the Detroit Shock in exchange for Jennifer Azzi and the 12th pick in the 2000 Draft.
- April 18, 2002: The Starzz traded Korie Hlede to the New York Liberty in exchange for the 14th pick in the 2002 Draft.
- January 28, 2004: The Silver Stars traded the fourth, 16th, and 29th picks in the 2004 Draft to the Connecticut Sun in exchange for Shannon Johnson, the 21st and the 34th picks in the 2004 Draft.
- July 19, 2004: The Silver Stars traded Gwen Jackson to the Phoenix Mercury in exchange for Adrian Williams.
- April 16, 2005: The Silver Stars traded Margo Dydek to the Connecticut Sun in exchange for Katie Feenstra and a first-round pick in the 2006 Draft.
- May 18, 2005: The Silver Stars traded Connecticut's first-round pick in the 2006 Draft to the Sacramento Monarchs in exchange for Chantelle Anderson.
- February 21, 2007: The Silver Stars traded a second-round pick in the 2007 Draft to the Phoenix Mercury in exchange for Sandora Irvin.
- February 22, 2007: The Silver Stars traded Katie Feenstra and the right to swap first-round picks in the 2008 Draft to the Detroit Shock in exchange for Ruth Riley.
- April 4, 2007: The Silver Stars traded Jessica Davenport and a first-round pick in the 2008 Draft to the New York Liberty in exchange for Becky Hammon and a second-round pick in the 2008 Draft.
- April 9, 2008: The Silver Stars traded Camille Little, Chioma Nnamaka, and a first-round pick in the 2009 Draft to the Atlanta Dream in exchange for Ann Wauters, Morenike Atunrase, and a second-round pick in the 2009 Draft.
- February 19, 2010: The Silver Stars acquired Roneeka Hodges from the Minnesota Lynx in exchange for the right to swap second-round picks in the 2011 Draft.
- March 11, 2010: The Silver Stars acquired Michelle Snow from the Atlanta Dream in exchange for Dalma Ivanyi and the right to swap second-round picks in the 2011 Draft.
- April 14, 2010: The Silver Stars traded Shanna Crossley to the Tulsa Shock in exchange for Crystal Kelly.
- April 20, 2011: The Silver Stars traded Michelle Snow to the Chicago Sky in exchange for Jia Perkins.
- May 2, 2011: The Silver Stars traded second- and third-round picks in the 2012 Draft to the Tulsa Shock in exchange for Scholanda Robinson.
- March 1, 2012: The Silver Stars traded Roneeka Hodges to the Indiana Fever in exchange for Tangela Smith.
- March 14, 2012: The Silver Stars traded Sonja Petrovic to the Chicago Sky in exchange for a third-round pick in the 2013 Draft.
- March 12, 2015: The Stars traded Shenise Johnson and a second-round pick in the 2015 Draft to the Indiana Fever in exchange for a first- and third-round picks in the 2015 Draft.
- April 16, 2015: The Stars traded the 9th overall pick in the 2015 Draft to the New York Liberty in exchange for Alex Montgomery.
- July 5, 2015: The Stars traded a second-round pick in the 2016 Draft to the Atlanta Dream in exchange for Samantha Logic.
- April 14, 2016: The Stars traded Jia Perkins to the Minnesota Lynx in exchange for Jazmon Gwathmey.
- May 9, 2016: The Stars traded a second-round pick in the 2017 Draft to the Phoenix Mercury in exchange for Monique Currie.
- January 31, 2017: The Stars traded Danielle Robinson to the Phoenix Mercury in exchange for Isabelle Harrison and the 5th pick in the 2017 Draft.
- February 27, 2017: The Stars traded Astou Ndour to the Chicago Sky in exchange for Clarissa Dos Santos.
- May 9, 2017: The Stars traded Jazmon Gwathmey to the Indiana Fever in exchange for the Fever's 2018 3rd round pick.
- June 28, 2017: The Stars traded Monique Currie to Phoenix Mercury for Shay Murphy, Sophie Brunner and Mercury's 2018 3rd Round Draft Pick.
- February 1, 2018: The Aces traded Kayla Alexander and their 3rd round pick in the 2019 Draft to Indiana Fever for their 2nd round pick in 2019 Draft.
- February 2, 2018: The Aces traded the 26th pick in the 2018 Draft and their 2nd round pick in the 2019 Draft to Phoenix Mercury for Kelsey Bone.
- May 16, 2019: The Aces traded Moriah Jefferson, Isabelle Harrison, their first and second round picks in the 2020 Draft to the Dallas Wings in exchange for Liz Cambage.
- February 15, 2021: The Aces traded Lindsay Allen and the 24th pick in the 2021 Draft to Indiana for the 14th pick in the 2021 Draft.
- April 10, 2022: The Aces traded their first and second round picks in the 2023 Draft to Minnesota for the 8th and 13th pick in the 2022 Draft.
- January 21, 2023: The Aces traded Dearica Hamby and their first round pick in the 2024 Draft to Los Angeles in exchange for Amanda Zahui B and a second round pick in the 2024 Draft.
- February 5, 2023 The Aces traded the negotiating rights to Amanda Zahui B to Washington in exchange for the Mystics' second round picks in the 2024 Draft and 2025 Draft.
- February 1, 2025: The Aces participated in a three team trade which saw them acquire Jewell Loyd and the 13th pick in the 2025 Draft in exchange for their 2026 first round draft pick and Kelsey Plum.
- February 7, 2025: The Aces traded the 16th and 22nd picks in the 2025 Draft in exchange for Dana Evans.
- June 30, 2025: The Aces traded their 2027 first round draft pick in exchange for NaLyssa Smith.

=== All-Stars ===
- 1997: No All-Star Game
- 1998: No All-Star Game
- 1999: Natalie Williams
- 2000: Natalie Williams
- 2001: Natalie Williams
- 2002: Marie Ferdinand-Harris, Adrienne Goodson
- 2003: Margo Dydek, Marie Ferdinand-Harris
- 2004: Shannon Johnson
- 2005: Marie Ferdinand-Harris
- 2006: Sophia Young
- 2007: Becky Hammon, Sophia Young
- 2008: No All-Star Game
- 2009: Becky Hammon, Sophia Young
- 2010: Jayne Appel, Becky Hammon, Michelle Snow, Sophia Young
- 2011: Danielle Adams, Becky Hammon
- 2012: No All-Star Game
- 2013: Danielle Robinson
- 2014: Danielle Robinson
- 2015: Kayla McBride, Danielle Robinson
- 2016: No All-Star Game
- 2018: Kayla McBride, A'ja Wilson
- 2019: Liz Cambage, Kayla McBride, A'ja Wilson
- 2020: No All-Star Game
- 2021: Liz Cambage, Chelsea Gray, Dearica Hamby, A'ja Wilson
- 2022: Dearica Hamby, Kelsey Plum, A'ja Wilson, Jackie Young
- 2023: A'ja Wilson, Jackie Young, Chelsea Gray, Kelsey Plum
- 2024: Chelsea Gray, Kelsey Plum, A'ja Wilson, Jackie Young
- 2025: A'ja Wilson, Jackie Young

=== Olympians ===
- 2000: Margo Dydek (POL), Natalie Williams
- 2004: Shannon Johnson
- 2008: Becky Hammon (RUS)
- 2012: Becky Hammon (RUS)
- 2016: Astou Ndour (ESP)
- 2020: Chelsea Gray, Park Ji-su (ROK), Kelsey Plum, A'ja Wilson, Jackie Young
- 2024: Megan Gustafson (ESP), Chelsea Gray, Tiffany Hayes (AZE 3x3), Kelsey Plum, A'ja Wilson, Jackie Young

=== Honors and awards ===
- 1997 All-WNBA Second Team: Wendy Palmer
- 1999 All-WNBA First Team: Natalie Williams
- 2000 All-WNBA First Team: Natalie Williams
- 2000 Peak Performer (FT%): Jennifer Azzi
- 2001 All-WNBA First Team: Natalie Williams
- 2005 All-Rookie Team: Katie Feenstra
- 2006 All-Rookie Team: Sophia Young
- 2007 All-WNBA First Team: Becky Hammon
- 2007 All-WNBA Second Team: Sophia Young
- 2007 All-Rookie Team: Camille Little
- 2007 Coach of the Year: Dan Hughes
- 2007 Peak Performer (Assists): Becky Hammon
- 2008 All-WNBA First Team: Sophia Young
- 2008 All-WNBA Second Team: Becky Hammon
- 2008 All-Defensive First Team: Sophia Young
- 2008 Kim Perrot Sportsmanship Award: Vickie Johnson
- 2009 All-WNBA First Team: Becky Hammon
- 2009 All-WNBA Second Team: Sophia Young
- 2011 Kim Perrot Sportsmanship Award: Ruth Riley
- 2011 All-Rookie Team: Danielle Adams
- 2011 All-Rookie Team: Danielle Robinson
- 2012 All-WNBA Second Team: Sophia Young
- 2012 All-Defensive Second Team: Danielle Robinson
- 2012 All-Defensive Second Team: Sophia Young
- 2013 Peak Performer (Assists): Danielle Robinson
- 2013 All-Defensive Second Team: Jia Perkins
- 2013 All-Defensive Second Team: Danielle Robinson
- 2014 Kim Perrot Sportsmanship Award: Becky Hammon
- 2014 All-WNBA Second Team: Danielle Robinson
- 2014 All-Defensive Second Team: Danielle Robinson
- 2014 All-Rookie Team: Kayla McBride
- 2016 All-Rookie Team: Moriah Jefferson
- 2017 All-Rookie Team: Kelsey Plum
- 2018 Rookie of the Year: A'ja Wilson
- 2019 Sixth Woman of the Year: Dearica Hamby
- 2019 All-WNBA Second Team: Liz Cambage
- 2020 Most Valuable Player: A'ja Wilson
- 2020 Sixth Woman of the Year: Dearica Hamby
- 2020 Executive of the Year: Dan Padover
- 2020 All-Defensive Second Team: A'ja Wilson
- 2020 All-WNBA First Team: A'ja Wilson
- 2021 Sixth Player of the Year: Kelsey Plum
- 2021 Basketball Executive of the Year: Dan Padover
- 2021 All-WNBA Second Team: A'ja Wilson
- 2022 Defensive Player of the Year: A'ja Wilson
- 2022 Most Valuable Player: A'ja Wilson
- 2022 All-WNBA First Team: A'ja Wilson
- 2022 Most Improved Player: Jackie Young
- 2022 All-Star Game MVP : Kelsey Plum
- 2022 All-WNBA First Team: Kelsey Plum
- 2022 Finals MVP: Chelsea Gray
- 2022 Coach of the Year: Becky Hammon
- 2023 Defensive Player of the Year: A'ja Wilson
- 2023 All-Defensive First Team: A'ja Wilson
- 2023 All-WNBA First Team: A'ja Wilson
- 2023 All-WNBA Second Team: Jackie Young, Chelsea Gray
- 2023 Sixth Player of the Year: Alysha Clark
- 2023 Finals MVP: A'ja Wilson
- 2024 WNBA MVP: A'ja Wilson
- 2024 Peak Performer (Points): A'ja Wilson
- 2024 All-WNBA First Team: A'ja Wilson
- 2024 All-Defensive First Team: A'ja Wilson
- 2024 Sixth Player of the Year: Tiffany Hayes
- 2025 WNBA MVP: A'ja Wilson
- 2025 WNBA Defensive Player of the Year: A'ja Wilson
- 2025 All-WNBA First Team: A'ja Wilson
- 2025 All-WNBA Second Team: Jackie Young
- 2025 All-Defensive First Team: A'ja Wilson

== Notes ==
Sporting positions
Preceded by Chicago Sky	WNBA Champions; 2022 (First title); 2023 (Second title)	Succeeded by New York Liberty
Preceded by Phoenix Mercury	WNBA Western Conference Champions; 2008 (First title)	Succeeded by Phoenix Mercury
