= 2000 Minnesota Lynx season =

- Head coach: Brian Agler
- Arena: Target Center

Results
- Record: 15–17 (.469)
- Place: 6th (Western)
- Playoff finish: Did not qualify

The 2000 Minnesota Lynx season was the 2nd season for the Minnesota Lynx of the Women's National Basketball Association, and the second season under head coach Brian Agler.

The season tipped-off on May 31, 2000 against the Rockers.

The Lynx matched their 15-17 from 1999, and came close to making the WNBA Playoffs, but they missed the playoffs for the second consecutive season.

== Transactions ==
=== Seattle Storm expansion draft ===
The following players were selected in the Seattle Storm expansion draft from the Minnesota Lynx:

| Player | Nationality | School/Team/Country |
|---|---|---|
| Angela Aycock | United States | Kansas |
| Charmin Smith | United States | Stanford |

=== WNBA draft ===
| Round | Pick | Player | Nationality | School/Team/Country |
|---|---|---|---|---|
| 1 | 5 | Grace Daley | United States | Tulane |
| 1 | 6 | Betty Lennox | United States | Louisiana Tech |
| 1 | 10 | Maylana Martin | United States | UCLA |
| 2 | 22 | Marla Brumfield | United States | Rice |
| 2 | 24 | Keitha Dickerson | United States | Texas Tech |
| 3 | 38 | Phylesha Whaley | United States | Oklahoma |
| 4 | 54 | Jana Lichnerová | Czechoslovakia | Saint Joseph's |
| 4 | 56 | Shanele Stires | United States | Columbus Quest |

=== Transactions ===
| Date | Transaction |
|---|---|
| December 15, 1999 | Lost Angela Aycock and Charmin Smith to the Seattle Storm in the WNBA expansion draft |
| February 21, 2000 | Traded Brandy Reed to the Phoenix Mercury in exchange for a 2000 1st Round Pick |
| April 14, 2000 | Traded Marlies Askamp to the Miami Sol in exchange for a 2000 1st Round Pick, 2000 2nd Round Pick and 2000 4th Round Pick |
| April 25, 2000 | Drafted Grace Daley, Betty Lennox, Maylana Martin, Marla Brumfield, Keitha Dickerson, Phylesha Whaley, Jana Lichnerová and Shanele Stires in the 2000 WNBA draft |
| May 3, 2000 | Signed Kate Paye |
| May 8, 2000 | Waived Jana Lichnerová |
| May 11, 2000 | Waived Phylesha Whaley |
| July 19, 2000 | Signed Angela Aycock |
| September 18, 2000 | Traded Grace Daley to the New York Liberty in exchange for 2001 1st Round Pick |

== Roster ==
2000 Minnesota Lynx roster
Players
Coaches

| Pos. | No. | Nat. | Name | Height | Weight | DOB | From | Yrs |
|---|---|---|---|---|---|---|---|---|
| G | 12 | (United States) | Aycock, Angela | 6' 2" (1.88m) | 161 lb (73kg) | 1973-02-28 | Kansas | 1 |
| G | 25 | (United States) | Brumfield, Marla | 5' 8" (1.73m) | 133 lb (60kg) | 1978-06-06 | Rice | R |
| G | 4 | (United States) | Daley, Grace | 5' 8" (1.73m) | 147 lb (67kg) | 1978-06-26 | Tulane | R |
| F | 40 | (United States) | Dickerson, Keitha | 5' 11" (1.8m) | 165 lb (75kg) | 1978-04-20 | Texas Tech | R |
| F | 24 | (United States) | Folkl, Kristin | 6' 2" (1.88m) | 190 lb (86kg) | 1975-12-19 | Stanford | 1 |
| G | 22 | (United States) | Lennox, Betty | 5' 8" (1.73m) | 143 lb (65kg) | 1976-12-04 | Louisiana Tech | R |
| F | 5 | (United States) | Lloyd-Curry, Andrea | 6' 2" (1.88m) | 175 lb (79kg) | 1965-09-25 | Texas | 1 |
| F/C | 13 | (United States) | Martin, Maylana | 6' 2" (1.88m) | 174 lb (79kg) | 1978-04-17 | UCLA | R |
| G | 14 | (United States) | Paye, Kate | 5' 8" (1.73m) | 150 lb (68kg) | 1974-03-06 | Stanford | R |
| F | 44 | (United States) | Potthoff, Angie | 6' 1" (1.85m) | 191 lb (87kg) | 1974-06-12 | Penn State | 1 |
| G | 30 | (United States) | Smith, Katie | 5' 11" (1.8m) | 175 lb (79kg) | 1974-06-04 | Ohio State | 1 |
| F | 3 | (United States) | Stires, Shanele | 5' 11" (1.8m) | 208 lb (94kg) | 1972-05-21 | Kansas State | R |
| G | 19 | (United States) | Tate, Sonja | 5' 7" (1.7m) | 157 lb (71kg) | 1971-09-07 | Arkansas State | 1 |

Head coach
(United States) Brian Agler (Wittenberg)
Assistant coaches
(United States) Kelly Kramer
(United States) Heidi VanDerveer

Legend

- (C) Team captain
- (DP) Unsigned draft pick
- (FA) Free agent
- (S) Suspended
- Injured

== Schedule ==
=== Regular season ===
2000 game log
Total: 15–17 (Home: 8–8; Road: 7–9)
May: 1–0 (Home: 1–0; Road: 0–0)

| Game | Date | Team | Score | High points | High rebounds | High assists | Location Attendance | Record |
|---|---|---|---|---|---|---|---|---|
| 1 | May 31 | Cleveland | W 73-62 | Katie Smith (34) | Katie Smith (7) | Dickerson; Folkl; Lennox (3) | Target Center | 1–0 |

June: 8–5 (Home: 3–2; Road: 5–3)

| Game | Date | Team | Score | High points | High rebounds | High assists | Location Attendance | Record |
|---|---|---|---|---|---|---|---|---|
| 2 | June 1 | @ Utah | L 74-83 | Kristin Folkl (20) | Kristin Folkl (8) | Keitha Dickerson (3) | Delta Center | 1–1 |
| 3 | June 3 | Los Angeles | L 75-82 | Katie Smith (33) | Betty Lennox (10) | Dickerson; Smith(5) | Target Center | 1–2 |
| 4 | June 5 | Detroit | W 88-68 | Kristin Folkl (19) | Kristin Folkl (12) | Kristin Folkl (5) | Target Center | 2–2 |
| 5 | June 8 | @ Orlando | W 71-57 | Betty Lennox (24) | Betty Lennox (7) | Lloyd-Curry; Smith (3) | TD Waterhouse Centre | 3–2 |
| 6 | June 10 | @ Miami | W 66-55 | Katie Smith (28) | Dickerson; Lennox (8) | Dickerson; Smith (3) | American Airlines Arena | 4–2 |
| 7 | June 15 | Orlando | W 72-66 | Betty Lennox (25) | Betty Lennox (6) | Andrea Lloyd-Curry (2) | Target Center | 5–2 |
| 8 | June 17 | @ Phoenix | W 69-62 | Katie Smith (26) | Kristin Folkl (8) | Grace Daley (4) | America West Arena | 6–2 |
| 9 | June 18 | @ Houston | L 66-78 | Katie Smith (18) | Betty Lennox (5) | Brumfield; Lennox (4) | Compaq Center | 6–3 |
| 10 | June 20 | Phoenix | L 55-74 | Betty Lennox (14) | Kristin Folkl (6) | Kristin Folkl (4) | Target Center | 6–4 |
| 11 | June 22 | Utah | W 86-64 | Katie Smith (21) | Dickerson; Martin (7) | Kate Paye (5) | Target Center | 7–4 |
| 12 | June 24 | @ Cleveland | W 60-57 (OT) | Betty Lennox (28) | Andrea Lloyd-Curry (6) | Katie Smith (4) | Gund Arena | 8–4 |
| 13 | June 28 | @ Sacramento | L 74-82 | Katie Smith (22) | Kristin Folkl (6) | Katie Smith (4) | ARCO Arena | 8–5 |
| 14 | June 30 | @ Seattle | W 65-53 | Katie Smith (19) | Grace Daley (8) | Folkl; Lloyd-Curry (4) | KeyArena | 9–5 |

July: 4–9 (Home: 3–4; Road: 1–5)

| Game | Date | Team | Score | High points | High rebounds | High assists | Location Attendance | Record |
|---|---|---|---|---|---|---|---|---|
| 15 | July 2 | Portland | W 81-75 | Katie Smith (32) | Kristin Folkl (7) | Betty Lennox (6) | Target Center | 10–5 |
| 16 | July 5 | Seattle | L 60-67 | Dickerson; Folkl (15) | Keitha Dickerson (7) | Kristin Folkl (4) | Target Center | 10–6 |
| 17 | July 7 | New York | L 70-76 | Betty Lennox (20) | Betty Lennox (12) | Dickerson; Smith (5) | Target Center | 10–7 |
| 18 | July 9 | Houston | L 60-70 | Katie Smith (18) | Kristin Folkl (9) | Kristin Folkl (6) | Target Center | 10–8 |
| 19 | July 11 | @ Phoenix | L 54-64 | Katie Smith (24) | Daley; Dickerson; Folkl (5) | Grace Daley (6) | America West Arena | 10–9 |
| 20 | July 14 | @ Portland | L 54-65 | Betty Lennox (15) | Betty Lennox (12) | Kate Paye (4) | Rose Garden | 10–10 |
| 21 | July 15 | @ Los Angeles | L 57-58 | Betty Lennox (21) | Daley; Lennox; Paye (9) | Folkl; Smith (3) | Great Western Forum | 10–11 |
| 22 | July 20 | @ Sacramento | L 56-73 | Katie Smith (23) | Betty Lennox (9) | Betty Lennox (7) | ARCO Arena | 10–12 |
| 23 | July 21 | @ Seattle | L 61-67 | Katie Smith (20) | Kristin Folkl (12) | Katie Smith (5) | KeyArena | 10–13 |
| 24 | July 23 | Portland | W 80-63 | Betty Lennox (26) | Betty Lennox (6) | Katie Smith (6) | Target Center | 11–13 |
| 25 | July 28 | Miami | W 68-44 | Katie Smith (25) | Kristin Folkl (8) | Daley; Lennox (4) | Target Center | 12–13 |
| 26 | July 29 | @ Washington | W 87-85 | Betty Lennox (31) | Dickerson; Lennox (6) | Grace Daley (7) | MCI Center | 13–13 |
| 27 | July 31 | Los Angeles | L 66-73 | Betty Lennox (20) | Kristin Folkl (8) | Keitha Dickerson (5) | Target Center | 13–14 |

August: 2–3 (Home: 1–2; Road: 1–1)

| Game | Date | Team | Score | High points | High rebounds | High assists | Location Attendance | Record |
|---|---|---|---|---|---|---|---|---|
| 28 | August 2 | Utah | L 62-72 | Betty Lennox (21) | Dickerson; Martin (5) | Betty Lennox (3) | Target Center | 13–15 |
| 29 | August 4 | Sacramento | L 63-74 | Katie Smith (24) | Keitha Dickerson (5) | Dickerson; Martin (4) | Target Center | 13–16 |
| 30 | August 6 | Indiana | W 80-75 | Betty Lennox (27) | Dickerson; Folkl (8) | Betty Lennox (8) | Target Center | 14–16 |
| 31 | August 8 | @ Charlotte | W 76-67 | Betty Lennox (27) | Dickerson; Lennox (6) | Kristin Folkl (6) | Charlotte Coliseum | 15–16 |
| 32 | August 9 | @ Houston | L 64-77 | Katie Smith (22) | Betty Lennox (8) | Lennox; Smith (6) | Compaq Center | 15–17 |

=== Season standings ===
| Western Conference | W | L | PCT | Conf. | GB |
|---|---|---|---|---|---|
| Los Angeles Sparks ^{x} | 28 | 4 | .875 | 17–4 | – |
| Houston Comets ^{x} | 27 | 5 | .844 | 17–4 | 1.0 |
| Sacramento Monarchs ^{x} | 21 | 11 | .656 | 13–8 | 7.0 |
| Phoenix Mercury ^{x} | 20 | 12 | .625 | 11–10 | 8.0 |
| Utah Starzz ^{o} | 18 | 14 | .563 | 13–8 | 10.0 |
| Minnesota Lynx ^{o} | 15 | 17 | .469 | 5–16 | 13.0 |
| Portland Fire ^{o} | 10 | 22 | .313 | 4–17 | 18.0 |
| Seattle Storm ^{o} | 6 | 26 | .188 | 4–17 | 22.0 |

== Statistics ==
Legend
| GP | Games played | GS | Games started | MPG | Minutes per game | RPG | Rebounds per game |
| APG | Assists per game | SPG | Steals per game | BPG | Blocks per game | PPG | Points per game |
| FG% | Field-goal percentage | 3P% | 3-point field-goal percentage | FT% | Free-throw percentage | TO | Turnovers per game |
| PF | Fouls per game | | Team leader | | League leader |

=== Regular season ===
| Player | GP | GS | MPG | FG% | 3P% | FT% | RPG | APG | SPG | BPG | PPG |
|---|---|---|---|---|---|---|---|---|---|---|---|
| Katie Smith | 32 | 32 | 37.3 | .421 | .379 | .869 | 2.9 | 2.8 | 1.4 | 0.2 | 20.2 |
| Betty Lennox | 32 | 31 | 30.8 | .427 | .396 | .800 | 5.6 | 2.6 | 1.7 | 0.3 | 16.9 |
| Kristin Folkl | 32 | 20 | 26.4 | .450 | .211 | .702 | 4.8 | 2.1 | 0.7 | 0.7 | 7.6 |
| Keitha Dickerson | 32 | 29 | 24.7 | .380 | .000 | .756 | 4.4 | 1.8 | 1.2 | 0.1 | 4.4 |
| Andrea Lloyd-Curry | 14 | 2 | 23.8 | .382 | .344 | .706 | 3.1 | 1.6 | 0.9 | 0.1 | 5.4 |
| Marla Brumfield | 32 | 17 | 19.2 | .465 | .111 | .690 | 1.9 | 1.3 | 0.7 | 0.1 | 3.9 |
| Grace Daley | 30 | 4 | 19.2 | .388 | .304 | .646 | 2.4 | 1.9 | 0.4 | 0.0 | 5.8 |
| Maylana Martin | 30 | 13 | 15.2 | .458 | .263 | .594 | 2.2 | 0.7 | 0.6 | 0.4 | 4.4 |
| Kate Paye | 28 | 12 | 14.6 | .328 | .293 | .667 | 2.1 | 1.4 | 0.3 | 0.2 | 2.0 |
| Sonja Tate | 8 | 0 | 11.8 | .455 | .545 | .500 | 1.6 | 0.6 | 0.4 | 0.0 | 3.4 |
| Shanele Stires | 21 | 0 | 5.6 | .448 | .500 | .667 | 0.7 | 0.3 | 0.3 | 0.0 | 1.7 |
| Angie Potthoff | 3 | 0 | 2.7 | .000 | .000 | N/A | 0.7 | 0.3 | 0.0 | 0.0 | 0.0 |
| Angela Aycock | 3 | 0 | 2.0 | N/A | N/A | N/A | 1.0 | 1.3 | 0.0 | 0.0 | 0.0 |

^{‡}Waived/Released during the season
^{†}Traded during the season
^{≠}Acquired during the season
