= 2001 Minnesota Lynx season =

- Head coach: Brian Agler
- Arena: Target Center

Results
- Record: 12–20 (.375)
- Place: 6th (Western)
- Playoff finish: Did not qualify

Media
- Television: KMSP (UPN 9); Fox Sports Net North

The 2001 Minnesota Lynx season was the 3rd season for the Minnesota Lynx of the Women's National Basketball Association, and the third season under head coach Brian Agler.

The season tipped-off on May 31, 2001 against the Fire.

The Lynx failed to improve or match their 15-17 records from the last two seasons, and they missed the playoffs for the third consecutive season.

== Transactions ==
=== WNBA draft ===
Round	Pick	Player	Nationality	School/Team/Country
1	7	Svetlana Abrosimova	Soviet Union	UConn
2	23	Erin Buescher	United States	Master's
2	28	Janell Burse	United States	Tulane
3	39	Tombi Bell	United States	Miami
4	55	Megan Taylor	United States	Iowa State

=== Transactions ===
Date	Transaction
February 20, 2001	Traded Kristin Folkl and a 2001 2nd Round Pick to the Portland Fire in exchange for Lynn Pride and Michele Van Gorp
April 17, 2001	Traded Annie La Fleur to the Washington Mystics in exchange for 2001 2nd Round Pick
April 20, 2001	Drafted Svetlana Abrosimova, Erin Buescher, Janell Burse, Tombi Bell and Megan Taylor in the 2001 WNBA draft
April 20, 2001	Traded a 2002 2nd Round Pick to the Detroit Shock in exchange for Val Whiting-Raymond
April 20, 2001	Traded Marla Brumfield to the Miami Sol in exchange for Georgia Schweitzer
April 25, 2001	Waived Angela Aycock
May 7, 2001	Waived Angie Potthoff and Tombi Bell
May 25, 2001	Waived Keitha Dickerson and Megan Taylor
May 27, 2001	Waived Andrea Lloyd-Curry and Sonja Tate

== Roster ==
2001 Minnesota Lynx roster
Players
Coaches

Pos.	No.	Nat.	Name	Height	Weight	DOB	From	Yrs
F	25	(Soviet Union)	Abrosimova, Svetlana	6' 2" (1.88m)	169 lb (77kg)	1980-07-09	Connecticut	R
F	11	(United States)	Buescher, Erin	6' 3" (1.91m)	181 lb (82kg)	1979-06-05	Master's	R
C	33	(United States)	Burse, Janell	6' 5" (1.96m)	199 lb (90kg)	1979-05-19	Tulane	R
G	8	(Australia)	Harrower, Kristi	5' 4" (1.63m)	139 lb (63kg)	1975-03-04		2
G	22	(United States)	Lennox, Betty	5' 8" (1.73m)	143 lb (65kg)	1976-12-04	Louisiana Tech	1
F/C	13	(United States)	Martin, Maylana	6' 2" (1.88m)	174 lb (79kg)	1978-04-17	UCLA	1
G	7	(United States)	Paye, Kate	5' 8" (1.73m)	150 lb (68kg)	1974-03-06	Stanford	1
G/F	34	(United States)	Pride, Lynn	6' 2" (1.88m)	180 lb (82kg)	1978-10-16	Kansas	1
G/F	23	(United States)	Schweitzer, Georgia	6' 0" (1.83m)		1979-01-31	Duke	R
G	30	(United States)	Smith, Katie	5' 11" (1.8m)	175 lb (79kg)	1974-06-04	Ohio State	2
F	3	(United States)	Stires, Shanele	5' 11" (1.8m)	208 lb (94kg)	1972-05-21	Kansas State	1
C	31	(United States)	Van Gorp, Michele	6' 6" (1.98m)	187 lb (85kg)	1977-05-10	Duke	2
F/C	52	(United States)	Whiting-Raymond, Val	6' 2" (1.88m)	199 lb (90kg)	1972-04-09	Stanford	1

Head coach
(United States) Brian Agler (Wittenberg)
Assistant coaches
(United States) Heidi VanDerveer
(United States) Kelly Kramer

Legend

- (C) Team captain
- (DP) Unsigned draft pick
- (FA) Free agent
- (S) Suspended
- Injured

== Schedule ==
=== Regular season ===
2001 game log
Total: 12–20 (Home: 6–11; Road: 6–9)
May: 1–0 (Home: 0–0; Road: 1–0)

Game	Date	Team	Score	High points	High rebounds	High assists	Location Attendance	Record
1	May 31	@ Portland	W 82–65	Katie Smith (31)	Lynn Pride (7)	Kristi Harrower (3)	Rose Garden	1–0

June : 4–6 (Home: 2–4; Road: 2–2)

Game	Date	Team	Score	High points	High rebounds	High assists	Location Attendance	Record
2	June 2	Phoenix	L 80–89	Katie Smith (22)	Betty Lennox (8)	Kate Paye (8)	Target Center	1–1
3	June 9	Los Angeles	L 60–62	Katie Smith (24)	Betty Lennox (11)	Paye; Smith (4)	Target Center	1–2
4	June 12	Indiana	L 60–65	Smith; Whiting-Raymond (13)	Val Whiting-Raymond (9)	Kristi Harrower (4)	Target Center	1–3
5	June 16	@ Indiana	L 67–68 (OT)	Katie Smith (22)	Betty Lennox (8)	Kate Paye (4)	Conseco Fieldhouse	1–4
6	June 17	@ Detroit	W 71–63	Katie Smith (40)	Betty Lennox (10)	Kate Paye (4)	The Palace of Auburn Hills	2–4
7	June 22	Miami	W 63–57	Katie Smith (26)	Erin Buescher (9)	Kate Paye (6)	Target Center	3–4
8	June 23	@ Utah	L 80–87	Katie Smith (27)	Svetlana Abrosimova (8)	Kate Paye (4)	Delta Center	3–5
9	June 25	@ Washington	W 55–51	Katie Smith (22)	Svetlana Abrosimova (10)	Paye; Stires (3)	MCI Center	4–5
10	June 28	Seattle	W 68–59	Katie Smith (26)	Svetlana Abrosimova (9)	Kate Paye (8)	Target Center	5–5
11	June 30	Houston	L 52–59	Katie Smith (18)	Abrosimova; Paye (5)	Kate Paye (5)	Target Center	5–6

July : 2–11 (Home: 2–5; Road: 0–6)

Game	Date	Team	Score	High points	High rebounds	High assists	Location Attendance	Record
12	July 1	@ Cleveland	L 47–52	Katie Smith (17)	Buescher; Paye (6)	Erin Buescher (4)	Gund Arena	5–7
13	July 3	Sacramento	L 52–91	Katie Smith (18)	Martin; Pride (5)	Erin Buescher (4)	Target Center	5–8
14	July 6	New York	L 57–70	Katie Smith (27)	Maylana Martin (7)	Kate Paye (4)	Target Center	5–9
15	July 8	@ Los Angeles	L 95–100	Katie Smith (46)	Buescher; Martin; Pride (5)	Katie Smith (4)	Staples Center	5–10
16	July 10	Portland	W 73–52	Katie Smith (28)	Abrosimova; Buescher (7)	Buescher; Paye; Smith (4)	Target Center	6–10
17	July 13	@ New York	L 64–67 (OT)	Katie Smith (23)	Maylana Martin (9)	Georgia Schweitzer (4)	Madison Square Garden	6–11
18	July 14	Phoenix	L 67–80	Katie Smith (27)	Svetlana Abrosimova (6)	Kate Paye (5)	Target Center	6–12
19	July 18	Seattle	W 68–58	Svetlana Abrosimova (21)	Abrosimova; Buescher; Paye; Smith (5)	Katie Smith (8)	Target Center	7–12
20	July 21	@ Orlando	L 49–71	Svetlana Abrosimova (27)	Lynn Pride (7)	Abrosimova; Buescher; Paye (2)	TD Waterhouse Centre	7–13
21	July 23	Houston	L 46–51	Svetlana Abrosimova (20)	Svetlana Abrosimova (11)	Abrosimova; Buescher (4)	Target Center	7–14
22	July 27	Washington	L 60–62	Katie Smith (22)	Buescher; Pride (8)	Erin Buescher (3)	Target Center	7–15
23	July 28	@ Utah	L 60–68 (OT)	Katie Smith (30)	Abrosimova; Buescher (9)	Abrosimova; Smith (2)	Delta Center	7–16
24	July 30	@ Los Angeles	L 69–78	Svetlana Abrosimova (27)	Svetlana Abrosimova (10)	Paye; Schweitzer; Van Gorp (4)	Staples Center	7–17

August : 5–3 (Home: 2–2; Road: 3–1)

Game	Date	Team	Score	High points	High rebounds	High assists	Location Attendance	Record
25	August 1	@ Phoenix	W 68–63	Katie Smith (36)	Lynn Pride (7)	Abrosimova; Paye (4)	America West Arena	8–17
26	August 3	Charlotte	L 64–72	Katie Smith (21)	Janell Burse (5)	Svetlana Abrosimova (4)	Target Center	8–18
27	August 5	Sacramento	W 79–76 (OT)	Svetlana Abrosimova (21)	Svetlana Abrosimova (15)	Georgia Schweitzer (6)	American Airlines Arena	9–18
28	August 7	@ Sacramento	L 59–76	Svetlana Abrosimova (16)	Abrosimova; Pride (7)	Svetlana Abrosimova (5)	ARCO Arena	9–19
29	August 8	@ Portland	W 70–58	Katie Smith (27)	Abrosimova; Smith (10)	Kate Paye (4)	Rose Garden	10–19
30	August 10	@ Seattle	W 65–51	Katie Smith (22)	Svetlana Abrosimova (13)	Abrosimova; Pride (4)	KeyArena	11–19
31	August 12	Utah	W 69–62	Betty Lennox (18)	Svetlana Abrosimova (12)	Katie Smith (5)	Target Center	12–19
32	August 14	Houston	L 60–74	Katie Smith (29)	Georgia Schweitzer (6)	Abrosimova; Van Gorp (3)	Compaq Center	12–20

2001 season schedule

=== Season standings ===
Western Conference	W	L	PCT	Conf.	GB
Los Angeles Sparks ^{x}	28	4	.875	19–2	–
Sacramento Monarchs ^{x}	20	12	.625	13–8	8.0
Utah Starzz ^{x}	19	13	.594	11–10	9.0
Houston Comets ^{x}	19	13	.594	13–8	9.0
Phoenix Mercury ^{o}	13	19	.406	8–13	15.0
Minnesota Lynx ^{o}	12	20	.375	9–12	16.0
Portland Fire ^{o}	11	21	.344	5–16	17.0
Seattle Storm ^{o}	10	22	.313	6–15	18.0

== Statistics ==
Legend
GP	Games played	GS	Games started	MPG	Minutes per game	RPG	Rebounds per game
APG	Assists per game	SPG	Steals per game	BPG	Blocks per game	PPG	Points per game
FG%	Field-goal percentage	3P%	3-point field-goal percentage	FT%	Free-throw percentage	TO	Turnovers per game
PF	Fouls per game		Team leader		League leader

=== Regular season ===
Player	GP	GS	MPG	FG%	3P%	FT%	RPG	APG	SPG	BPG	PPG
Katie Smith	32	32	38.6	.393	.354	.895	3.8	2.2	0.7	0.2	23.1
Svetlana Abrosimova	26	23	32.5	.391	.260	.727	6.7	2.0	1.6	0.3	13.3
Erin Buescher	32	19	22.7	.348	.276	.618	3.7	1.9	0.8	0.9	5.7
Lynn Pride	32	14	22.3	.391	.250	.600	4.6	0.9	0.9	0.6	5.3
Betty Lennox	11	7	21.9	.373	.385	.950	4.9	1.5	0.9	0.4	11.0
Kate Paye	32	16	20.4	.385	.357	.688	1.9	3.0	0.7	0.0	2.8
Kristi Harrower	4	1	18.0	.467	.500	1.000	1.0	2.8	0.8	0.0	5.3
Val Whiting-Raymond	26	15	17.8	,267	.000	.741	3.2	0.6	0.6	0.5	3.4
Georgia Schweitzer	24	8	17.6	.314	.167	.765	2.1	1.4	0.5	0.3	3.5
Maylana Martin	31	12	15.9	.340	.333	.613	2.8	0.6	0.5	0.5	3.1
Shanele Stires	18	5	11.2	.377	.240	.714	1.5	0.8	0.4	0.2	2.8
Michele Van Gorp	22	8	11.0	.375	.000	.550	1.5	0.5	0.1	0.3	1.9
Janell Burse	20	0	8.5	.333	.000	.750	2.1	0.3	0.1	0.8	2.4

^{‡}Waived/Released during the season
^{†}Traded during the season
^{≠}Acquired during the season
