= Grace Daley =

American basketball player (born 1978)

Personal information
- Born: June 26, 1978 (age 48) Miami, Florida, U.S.
- Listed height: 5 ft 6 in (1.68 m)
- Listed weight: 147 lb (67 kg)

Career information
- High school: Lake Weir (Ocala, Florida)
- College: Tulane (1996–2000)
- WNBA draft: 2000: 1st round, 5th overall pick
- Drafted by: Minnesota Lynx
- Playing career: 2000–2003
- Position: Guard

Career history
- 2000: Minnesota Lynx
- 2001: New York Liberty
- 2002: Houston Comets
- 2003: Phoenix Mercury

Career highlights
- CUSA Player of the Year (2000); Third-team All-American – AP (2000); CUSA Tournament MVP (1999); CUSA Defensive Player of the Year (1998); 3× First-team All-CUSA (1998–2000); CUSA Sixth Player of the Year (1997); CUSA Freshman of the Year (1997); CUSA All-Freshman Team (1997)
- Stats at Basketball Reference

Grace Elizabeth Daley (born June 26, 1978) is an African American former professional women's basketball player, who is now an English teacher at Grace Cristian School in Ocala, Florida.

Daley was born in Miami, Florida, and attended Tulane University, graduating in 2000. Following her collegiate career, she was selected 5th overall in the 2000 WNBA draft by the Minnesota Lynx. She also played for the New York Liberty, Houston Comets and Phoenix Mercury.

== Personal life ==
When Daley was 16, her family joined the Seventh-day Adventist Church.

== Tulane statistics ==
Legend
GP	Games played	GS	Games started	MPG	Minutes per game
FG%	Field goal percentage	3P%	3-point field goal percentage	FT%	Free throw percentage
RPG	Rebounds per game	APG	Assists per game	SPG	Steals per game
BPG	Blocks per game	PPG	Points per game	**Bold**	Career high

Year	Team	GP	Points	FG%	3P%	FT%	RPG	APG	SPG	BPG	PPG
1996–97	Tulane	**32**	432	49.5%	**44.7%**	76.1%	4.0	1.6	2.3	0.1	13.5
1997–98	Tulane	28	563	**51.3%**	36.8%	74.7%	4.4	2.6	**2.9**	0.1	20.1
1998–99	Tulane	30	572	51.3%	32.5%	**81.6%**	5.2	3.2	1.9	0.2	19.1
1999–2000	Tulane	**32**	**692**	48.8%	32.1%	60.7%	**5.9**	**3.9**	2.3	**0.3**	**21.6**
Totals		122	2259	50.2%	35.6%	77.7%	4.9	2.8	2.4	0.1	18.5

== WNBA career statistics ==
Legend
GP	Games played	GS	Games started	MPG	Minutes per game	RPG	Rebounds per game
APG	Assists per game	SPG	Steals per game	BPG	Blocks per game	PPG	Points per game
TO	Turnovers per game	FG%	Field-goal percentage	3P%	3-point field-goal percentage	FT%	Free-throw percentage
**Bold**	Career best	°	League leader

=== Regular season ===
Year	Team	GP	GS	MPG	FG%	3P%	FT%	RPG	APG	SPG	BPG	TO	PPG
2000	Minnesota	**30**	**4**	**19.2**	.388	**.304**	**.646**	**2.4**	**1.9**	0.4	0.0	1.7	**5.8**
2001	New York	15	0	4.4	**.476**	.000	.556	0.5	0.7	**0.5**	0.1	**0.5**	1.7
2002	Houston	23	**4**	8.0	.432	.250	.617	1.0	0.7	0.1	0.0	0.7	2.7
2003	Phoenix	3	0	9.3	.200	.000	.000	0.7	1.0	0.0	**0.3**	1.0	0.7
Career	4 years, 4 teams	71	8	12.1	.400	.268	.628	1.5	1.2	0.3	0.0	1.1	3.7

=== Playoffs ===
Year	Team	GP	GS	MPG	FG%	3P%	FT%	RPG	APG	SPG	BPG	TO	PPG
2001	New York	**1**	0	1.0	.000	.000	.000	0.0	0.0	0.0	0.0	**1.0**	0.0
2002	Houston	**1**	0	**7.0**	.000	.000	**1.000**	**2.0**	0.0	0.0	0.0	**1.0**	**2.0**
Career	2 years, 2 teams	2	0	4.0	.000	.000	1.000	1.0	0.0	0.0	0.0	1.0	1.0
