= Maylana Martin =

American basketball player and coach (born 1978)

Personal information
- Born: April 17, 1978 (age 48) Honolulu, Hawaii, U.S.
- Listed height: 6 ft 2 in (1.88 m)
- Listed weight: 174 lb (79 kg)

Career information
- High school: Perris High School (Perris, California)
- College: UCLA (1996–2000)
- WNBA draft: 2000: 1st round, 10th overall pick
- Drafted by: Minnesota Lynx
- Playing career: 2000–2001
- Position: Center / power forward
- Number: 13
- Coaching career: 2003–present

Career history

Playing
- 2000–2001: Minnesota Lynx

Coaching
- 2003–2004: Portland (assistant)
- 2004–2008: UCLA (assistant)
- 2008–2010: Pepperdine (assistant)

Career highlights
- Third-team All-American – AP (1999); Kodak All-American (1999); Pac-10 Player of the Year (1999); 4× First-team All-All Pac-10 (1997–2000); Pac-10 Freshman of the Year (1997)

Career WNBA statistics
- Points: 227 (3.7 ppg)
- Rebounds: 153 (2.5 rpg)
- Assists: 40 (0.7 apg)
- Stats at WNBA.com
- Stats at Basketball Reference
Medals
Women's basketball
Representing United States
FIBA Under-19 World Cup
| Gold medal – first place | 1997 Brazil | Team |
FIBA Under-18 Americas Championship
| Silver medal – second place | 1996 Mexico | Team |

Maylana Lynn Martin (born April 17, 1978) is an American former professional women's basketball player and currently a collegiate coach.

Although born in Honolulu, Hawaii, she grew up in Southern California. She attended Perris High School, where she was a multi-sport athlete, being a four-year letterman in basketball, lettered for three years in volleyball, and lettered for two years on the track team.

Martin attended college at UCLA and graduated in 2000. She began her professional career with the Minnesota Lynx of the Women's National Basketball Association during the 2000 WNBA draft, and played with the team for two years.

In 2002, the Lynx traded Martin and teammate Erin Buescher to the Charlotte Sting in exchange for Shaunzinski Gortman, the Sting's 9th overall selection in the 2002 WNBA draft. However, she was waived by the Sting during their pre-season training camp due to injury.

She began her coaching career as an assistant coach at the University of Portland in 2003. Beginning with 2004, she served as an assistant coach to her alma mater, UCLA. She went on to coach at Pepperdine from 2008 to 2010.

Now serves as a college basketball analyst for the Pac-12 Network. Maylana is married to USC Lineman Rome Douglas and the couple has 4 children.

== WNBA career statistics ==
Legend
| GP | Games played | GS | Games started | MPG | Minutes per game | RPG | Rebounds per game |
| APG | Assists per game | SPG | Steals per game | BPG | Blocks per game | PPG | Points per game |
| TO | Turnovers per game | FG% | Field-goal percentage | 3P% | 3-point field-goal percentage | FT% | Free-throw percentage |
| **Bold** | Career best | ° | League leader |

=== Regular season ===
| Year | Team | GP | GS | MPG | FG% | 3P% | FT% | RPG | APG | SPG | BPG | TO | PPG |
|---|---|---|---|---|---|---|---|---|---|---|---|---|---|
| 2000 | Minnesota | 30 | **13** | 15.2 | **.458** | .263 | .594 | 2.2 | **0.7** | **0.6** | 0.4 | 1.0 | **4.4** |
| 2001 | Minnesota | **31** | 12 | **15.9** | .340 | **.333** | **.613** | **2.8** | 0.6 | **0.5** | **0.5** | 1.2 | 3.1 |
| Career | 2 years, 1 team | 61 | 25 | 15.6 | .403 | .297 | .603 | 2.5 | 0.7 | 0.6 | 0.5 | 1.1 | 3.7 |

== UCLA statistics ==
Legend
| GP | Games played | GS | Games started | MPG | Minutes per game |
| FG% | Field goal percentage | 3P% | 3-point field goal percentage | FT% | Free throw percentage |
| RPG | Rebounds per game | APG | Assists per game | SPG | Steals per game |
| BPG | Blocks per game | PPG | Points per game | **Bold** | Career high |

| Year | Team | GP | Points | FG% | 3P% | FT% | RPG | APG | SPG | BPG | PPG |
|---|---|---|---|---|---|---|---|---|---|---|---|
| 1999-00 | UCLA | 29 | 506 | 54.7% | 0.0% | 58.5% | 8.7 | 1.7 | 1.9 | **1.3** | 17.4 |
| 1998–99 | UCLA | **31** | **565** | 54.1% | **33.3%** | 71.3% | **9.4** | **2.0** | **2.4** | 0.7 | 18.2 |
| 1997–98 | UCLA | 29 | 546 | 53.6% | 0.0% | 72.0% | 7.4 | 1.1 | 1.5 | 0.8 | **18.8** |
| 1996–97 | UCLA | 27 | 484 | **55.9%** | 0.0% | **74.7%** | 6.5 | 1.3 | 2.4 | 0.4 | 17.9 |
| Career | UCLA | 116 | 2101 | 54.5% | 14.3% | 69.0% | 8.1 | 1.5 | 2.0 | 0.8 | 18.1 |

== USA Basketball ==
Martin was named to the USA Basketball Women's Junior National Team (now called the U18 team). The team participated in the third Junior World Championship, held in Chetumal, Mexico in late August and early September 1996. The USA team won their early games easily, but lost by four points to the team from Brazil, ending up with the silver medal for the event.

Martin continued with the team when it was invited to the 1997 FIBA Junior World Championship (now called U19) held in Natal, Brazil. In the opening game against Japan, Martin had a double-double with 24 points and eleven rebounds, leading the team to a win. The next game was against Australia, the defending champion. The USA team pulled out to a 13-point lead in the second half, but gave up the lead and lost the game 80–74. The USA rebounded with a close 92–88 victory over Cuba, helped by 23 points from Martin and Lynn Pride. The USA then went on to beat previously unbeaten Russia. After winning the next two games, the USA faced Australia in the gold medal game. The USA team has a three-point lead late, but the Aussies hit a three-pointer with three seconds left in regulation to force overtime. Although the Aussies scored first, the USA team came back, held on to win 78–74 to earn the gold, and the first medal for a USA team at a Junior World Championship. Martin was the leading scorer for the USA team with 17.9 points per game and the second leading rebounder with 7.0 per game.
