= 2000 WNBA draft =

2000 meeting of WNBA teams to select players

General information
- Sport: Basketball
- Date(s): April 25, 2000

Overview
- League: WNBA
- Expansion teams: Indiana Fever; Miami Sol; Portland Fire; Seattle Storm
- First selection: Ann Wauters; Cleveland Rockers

2000 WNBA draft

- On December 15, 1999, a WNBA expansion draft took place for four new WNBA teams, the Indiana Fever, Miami Sol, Portland Fire, and Seattle Storm.
- On April 25, 2000, the regular WNBA draft took place.

!	Denotes player who has been inducted to the Naismith Memorial Basketball Hall of Fame
^	Denotes player who has been inducted to the Women's Basketball Hall of Fame
*	Denotes player who has been selected for at least one All-Star Game and All-WNBA Team
^{+}	Denotes player who has been selected for at least one All-Star Game
^{#}	Denotes player who never played in the WNBA regular season or playoffs
**Bold**	Denotes player who won Rookie of the Year

== Draft ==
=== Round 1 ===
Pick	Player	Position	Nationality	Team	School / club team
1	Ann Wauters ^{+}	C	Belgium	Cleveland Rockers	Valenciennes (France)
2	Tausha Mills	C	United States	Washington Mystics	Alabama (from Chicago Condors, ABL)
3	Edwina Brown	G	United States	Detroit Shock (from Utah) (Note: April 24, 2000: Utah to Detroit: Utah acquired Jennifer Azzi and a first-round pick (12th overall); Detroit acquired a first-round pick (3rd overall) and Miami's first-round pick (8th overall))	Texas
4	Cíntia dos Santos	F/C	Brazil	Orlando Miracle	Brazil
5	Grace Daley	G	United States	Minnesota Lynx (from Phoenix) (Note: February 21, 2000: Phoenix to Minnesota: Phoenix acquired Brandy Reed; Minnesota acquired a first-round pick (5th overall))	Tulane
6	**Betty Lennox** *	G	United States	Minnesota Lynx	Louisiana Tech
7	Lynn Pride	G/F	United States	Portland Fire	Kansas
8	Tamicha Jackson	G	United States	Detroit Shock (from Utah via Miami) (Note: December 15, 1999: Miami to Utah: Miami acquired Elena Baranova and a second-round pick (19th overall); Utah acquired Kate Starbird and a first-round pick (8th overall))	Louisiana Tech
9	Kamila Vodichkova	F/C	Czech Republic	Seattle Storm	Gambrinus Brno
10	Maylana Martin	F	United States	Minnesota Lynx (from Miami via Indiana) (Note: December 15, 1999: Indiana to Miami: Indiana acquired Stephanie McCarty; Miami acquired Sandy Brondello and a 2000 first-round pick (10th overall)) (Note: April 14, 2000: Miami to Minnesota: Miami acquired Marlies Askamp; Minnesota acquired Indiana's first-round pick (10th overall), second- and third-round picks (24th and 56th overall))	UCLA
11	Summer Erb	C	United States	Charlotte Sting	North Carolina State
12	Naomi Mulitauaopele	C	United States	Utah Starzz (from Detroit)	Stanford
13	Olga Firsova	C	Ukraine	New York Liberty	Kansas State
14	Katy Steding	F	United States	Sacramento Monarchs	Stanford (from Portland Power, ABL)
15	Nicole Kubik	G	United States	Los Angeles Sparks	Nebraska
16	Elena Shakirova	F/C	Russia	Houston Comets	Dynamo Moscow

=== Round 2 ===
Pick	Player	Position	Nationality	Team	School / club team
17	Helen Darling	G	United States	Cleveland Rockers	Penn State
18	Tonya Massaline	G/F	United States	Washington Mystics	Florida
19	Jameka Jones	G	United States	Miami Sol (from Utah)	UNC Charlotte
20	Jannon Roland	F	United States	Orlando Miracle	Purdue (from New England Blizzard, ABL)
21	Adrian Williams ^{+}	F/C	United States	Phoenix Mercury	USC
22	Marla Brumfield	G	United States	Minnesota Lynx	Rice
23	Stacey Thomas	F	United States	Portland Fire	Michigan
24	Keitha Dickerson	F	United States	Minnesota Lynx (from Miami)	Texas Tech
25	Charisse Sampson	G	United States	Seattle Storm	Kansas (from New England Blizzard, ABL)
26	Jurgita Štreimikytė	F	Lithuania	Indiana Fever	Pool Comense (Italy)
27	Tiffany Travis	G/F	United States	Charlotte Sting	Florida
28	Madinah Slaise	G	United States	Detroit Shock	Cincinnati
29	Desiree Francis	F	United States	New York Liberty	Iowa State
30	Stacy Clinesmith	G	United States	Sacramento Monarchs	UC Santa Barbara
31	Paige Sauer	C	United States	Los Angeles Sparks	Connecticut
32	Andrea Garner	C	United States	Houston Comets	Penn State

=== Round 3 ===
Pick	Player	Position	Nationality	Team	School / club team
33	Monique Morehouse ^{#}	C	United States	Cleveland Rockers	Auburn (from New England Blizzard, ABL)
34	Jill Morton ^{#}	G	United States	Charlotte Sting (from Washington) (Note: January 19, 2000: Washington to Charlotte: Washington acquired Vicky Bullett; Charlotte acquired Shalonda Enis and a third-round pick (34th overall))	Louisville
35	Stacy Frese	G	United States	Utah Starzz	Iowa State
36	Shawnetta Stewart ^{#}	G	United States	Orlando Miracle	Rutgers
37	Tauja Catchings ^{#}	F	United States	Phoenix Mercury	Illinois
38	Phylesha Whaley ^{#}	F	United States	Minnesota Lynx	Oklahoma
39	Maxann Reese ^{#}	G	United States	Portland Fire	Michigan State
40	Milena Flores	G	United States	Miami Sol	Stanford
41	Kirra Jordan ^{#}	F	United States	Seattle Storm	Rice
42	Usha Gilmore	G/F	United States	Indiana Fever	Rutgers
43	Peppi Browne ^{#}	G/F	United States	Charlotte Sting	Duke
44	Chavonne Hammond ^{#}	G/F	United States	Detroit Shock	Vanderbilt
45	Jessica Bibby	G	Australia	New York Liberty	Dandenong Rangers (Australia)
46	Rhonda Banchero	C	United States	Sacramento Monarchs	Washington
47	Marte Alexander ^{#}	C	United States	Los Angeles Sparks	Arizona
48	Latavia Coleman ^{#}	F	United States	Houston Comets (traded to Indiana)	Florida State

=== Round 4 ===
Pick	Player	Position	Nationality	Team	School / club team
49	Sophie von Saldern ^{#}	F/C	Germany	Cleveland Rockers	California
50	Latina Davis ^{#}	G	United States	Indiana Fever (from Washington, traded to Houston) (Note: December 15, 1999: Indiana acquired Monica Maxwell and Washington's third-round pick (50th overall) for selecting Nyree Roberts in the third round of the 2000 WNBA Expansion Draft.)	Tennessee
51	Kristen Rasmussen	F	United States	Utah Starzz	Michigan State
52	Romana Hamzová	G	Czech Republic	Orlando Miracle	Gambrinus Brno
53	Shantia Owens	C	United States	Phoenix Mercury (traded to Miami)	Kentucky
54	Jana Lichnerová ^{#}	C	Slovakia	Minnesota Lynx	Saint Joseph's
55	Rhonda L. Smith ^{#}	C	United States	Portland Fire	Long Beach State
56	Shanele Stires	F	United States	Minnesota Lynx (from Miami)	Kansas State (from Columbus Quest, ABL)
57	Katrina Hibbert	G	Australia	Seattle Storm	LSU
58	Renee Robinson	G	United States	Indiana Fever (traded to Houston)	Virginia
59	Shaka Massey ^{#}	C	United States	Charlotte Sting	Louisiana Tech
60	Cal Bouchard ^{#}	G	Canada	Detroit Shock	Boston College
61	Natalie Porter ^{#}	F	Australia	New York Liberty	Australia
62	Jessica Zinobile ^{#}	F	United States	Sacramento Monarchs	Saint Francis (PA)
63	Nicky McCrimmon	G	United States	Los Angeles Sparks	USC
64	Abbie Willenborg ^{#}	F	United States	Houston Comets	Marquette

== See also ==
- List of first overall WNBA draft picks
