= Michaela Pavlíčková =

Czech basketball player (born 1977)

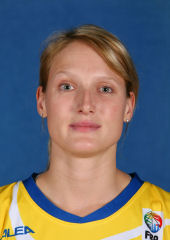
- Michaela Pavlíčková (2007)

Medal record

Representing Czech Republic

Women's basketball

European Championships
Gold medal – first place	2005 Turkey	Team competition
Silver medal – second place	2003 Greece	Team competition

Michaela Pavlíčková (born 27 November 1977 in Prague) is a Czech former basketball player who competed in the 2004 Summer Olympics. A forward, she attended the University of Denver where she played for its women's basketball team, coming from her last secondary year at Boulder High School in Boulder, Colorado, after moving from Prague. Pavlíčková was drafted in the second round of the 2001 WNBA draft by the Utah Starzz, playing 18 games in two separate seasons for the Starzz and the Phoenix Mercury. After her WNBA stint was over, she moved back to Europe to finish her professional career.

== Career statistics ==
Legend
GP	Games played	GS	Games started	MPG	Minutes per game	RPG	Rebounds per game
APG	Assists per game	SPG	Steals per game	BPG	Blocks per game	PPG	Points per game
TO	Turnovers per game	FG%	Field-goal percentage	3P%	3-point field-goal percentage	FT%	Free-throw percentage
**Bold**	Career best	°	League leader

=== WNBA ===
==== Regular season ====
WNBA regular season statistics
Year	Team	GP	GS	MPG	FG%	3P%	FT%	RPG	APG	SPG	BPG	TO	PPG
2001	Utah	10	0	2.1	.000	—	.500	0.6	0.1	0.0	0.2	0.2	0.1
2002	Did not play (waived)												
2003	Phoenix	8	0	3.6	.429	.000	—	0.5	0.1	0.1	0.0	0.3	0.8
**Career**	2 years, 2 teams	18	0	2.8	.333	.000	.500	0.6	0.1	0.1	0.2	0.1	0.4

==== Playoffs ====
WNBA playoff statistics
Year	Team	GP	GS	MPG	FG%	3P%	FT%	RPG	APG	SPG	BPG	TO	PPG
2001	Utah	1	0	—	—	—	0.0	0.0	0.0	0.0	0.0	0.0	0.0
**Career**	1 year, 1 team	1	0	—	—	—	0.0	0.0	0.0	0.0	0.0	0.0	0.0
