= Shanele Stires =

American basketball player and coach (born 1972)

Cal Poly Mustangs
- Title: Head coach
- League: Big West Conference

Personal information
- Born: May 21, 1972 (age 54) Junction City, Kansas
- Listed height: 5 ft 11 in (1.80 m)
- Listed weight: 170 lb (77 kg)

Career information
- High school: Salina Central (Salina, Kansas)
- College: Cloud County CC (1991–1992); Kansas State (1992–1995)
- WNBA draft: 2000: 4th round, 56th overall pick
- Drafted by: Minnesota Lynx
- Playing career: 1996–2002
- Position: Forward
- Number: 3
- Coaching career: 2003–present

Career history

Playing
- 1996–1999: Columbus Quest
- 2000–2002: Minnesota Lynx

Coaching
- 2003–2006: Ohio (assistant)
- 2006–2008: San Francisco (assistant)
- 2008–2010: San Diego State (assistant)
- 2010–2011: Stetson (assistant)
- 2011–2012: Nebraska–Omaha (assistant)
- 2012–2014: San Francisco (assistant)
- 2014–2016: San Francisco (associate HC)
- 2016–2022: Cal State East Bay
- 2022–present: Cal Poly

Career highlights
- First-team All-Big 8 (1995)

Career WNBA statistics
- Points: 92 (1.9 ppg)
- Rebounds: 47 (1.0 rpg)
- Assists: 22 (0.5 apg)
- Stats at Basketball Reference

Shanele Marie Stires (born May 21, 1972) is an American retired professional women's basketball player and current college basketball coach.

== Career ==
She is the head coach of the Cal Poly women's basketball team since April 2022.

Stires attended Cloud County Community College during her freshman year before transferring to Kansas State University, where she graduated in 1995 with a B.S. degree in Social Science. With Kansas State, Stires scored 1,344 career points, and as a senior was selected for Kodak All-America honorable mention and All-Big 8 First Team accolades.

She started her American professional career playing for the Columbus Quest in the now-defunct American Basketball League (ABL). After the ABL ceased operations, she joined the Women's National Basketball Association and played for the Minnesota Lynx for three seasons after being drafted with the 56th overall pick in 2000.

After her playing career she served three years as an assistant coach for the women's basketball team at Ohio University. In August 2006, she was named as an assistant coach at University of San Francisco. Stires also pursued a Master's Degree in Coaching Education from Ohio University.

Stires served as head coach for Cal State East Bay, coaching the Pioneers to their first-ever Division II NCAA Tournament Sweet 16 appearance in 2022.

Her brother, Sean Stires, is a play-by-play radio announcer for the University of Notre Dame's women's basketball team.

== Career statistics ==
Legend
GP	Games played	GS	Games started	MPG	Minutes per game	RPG	Rebounds per game
APG	Assists per game	SPG	Steals per game	BPG	Blocks per game	PPG	Points per game
TO	Turnovers per game	FG%	Field-goal percentage	3P%	3-point field-goal percentage	FT%	Free-throw percentage
**Bold**	Career best	°	League leader

=== WNBA ===
==== Regular season ====
Year	Team	GP	GS	MPG	FG%	3P%	FT%	RPG	APG	SPG	BPG	TO	PPG
2000	Minnesota	**21**	0	5.6	.448	**.500**	.667	0.7	0.3	0.3	0.0	0.7	1.7
2001	Minnesota	18	**5**	**11.2**	.377	.240	**.714**	**1.5**	**0.8**	**0.4**	**0.2**	1.1	**2.8**
2002	Minnesota	9	0	2.4	**.500**	**.500**	.500	0.7	0.1	0.0	0.1	0.2	0.7
Career	3 years, 1 team	48	5	7.1	.407	.324	.667	1.0	0.5	0.3	0.1	0.7	1.9

Legend
GP	Games played	GS	Games started	MPG	Minutes per game	RPG	Rebounds per game
APG	Assists per game	SPG	Steals per game	BPG	Blocks per game	PPG	Points per game
TO	Turnovers per game	FG%	Field-goal percentage	3P%	3-point field-goal percentage	FT%	Free-throw percentage
**Bold**	Career best	°	League leader

=== College ===
Year	Team	GP	GS	MPG	FG%	3P%	FT%	RPG	APG	SPG	BPG	TO	PPG
1992–93	Kansas State	27	-	-	41.3	24.1	66.7	**9.0**	2.2	2.0	**0.3**	-	13.4
1993–94	Kansas State	27	-	-	47.3	33.0	**75.4**	8.7	**2.4**	**2.2**	0.0	-	17.1
1994–95	Kansas State	27	-	-	**47.8**	**34.3**	68.8	8.3	1.9	2.0	0.1	-	**19.3**
**Career**		81	-	-	45.7	32.4	70.3	8.7	2.2	2.1	0.1	-	16.6
Statistics retrieved from Sports-Reference.
