= Cara Consuegra =

American basketball player and coach

Marquette Golden Eagles
- Title: Head coach
- League: Big East Conference

Personal information
- Born: March 4, 1979 (age 47) Baltimore, Maryland, U.S.
- Listed height: 5 ft 8 in (1.73 m)
- Listed weight: 146 lb (66 kg)

Career information
- High school: Linganore (Frederick, Maryland)
- College: Iowa (1997–2001)
- WNBA draft: 2001: 4th round, 54th overall pick
- Drafted by: Utah Starzz
- Position: Point guard
- Number: 21
- Coaching career: 2001–present

Career history

Playing
- 2001: Utah Starzz

Coaching
- 2001–2004: Penn State (DBO)
- 2004–2011: Marquette (assistant)
- 2011–2024: Charlotte
- 2024–present: Marquette

Career highlights
- As head coach: C-USA regular season (2022); C-USA Tournament (2022); C-USA Coach of the Year (2022); Big East Co-Coach of the Year (2025); As player: Big Ten Tournament MOP (2001)
- Stats at Basketball Reference

Cara Ashley Consuegra (born March 4, 1979) is an American women's basketball coach, currently the head coach at Marquette. Previously, she had been the head coach with the Charlotte 49ers women's basketball team, and before that she spent 7 seasons as an assistant coach at Marquette. Her current head coaching record is 224–164.

Consuegra played at Iowa from 1997–2001, where she was the first Hawkeyes player to score more than 1,000 points and 500 assists. She then played one year for the Utah Starzz in the WNBA.

== Career statistics ==
Legend
GP	Games played	GS	Games started	MPG	Minutes per game	RPG	Rebounds per game
APG	Assists per game	SPG	Steals per game	BPG	Blocks per game	PPG	Points per game
TO	Turnovers per game	FG%	Field-goal percentage	3P%	3-point field-goal percentage	FT%	Free-throw percentage
**Bold**	Career best	°	League leader

=== WNBA ===
WNBA regular season statistics
Year	Team	GP	GS	MPG	FG%	3P%	FT%	RPG	APG	SPG	BPG	TO	PPG
2001	Utah	15	0	3.3	.000	.000	.500	0.4	0.7	0.3	0.0	0.7	0.1
**Career**	1 year, 1 team	15	0	3.3	.000	.000	.500	0.4	0.7	0.3	0.0	0.7	0.1

=== College ===
NCAA statistics
Year	Team	GP	Points	FG%	3P%	FT%	RPG	APG	SPG	BPG	PPG
1997–98	Iowa	24	97	35.6%	23.1%	62.9%	2.1	3.9	0.5	0.1	4.0
1998–99	Iowa	27	309	**45.7%**	**32.1%**	68.2%	2.6	5.7	1.4	0.1	11.4
1999–00	Iowa	27	**394**	38.8%	21.3%	**81.9%**	**3.7**	5.1	**2.0**	**0.1**	**14.6**
2000–01	Iowa	**31**	347	40.2%	26.5%	75.0%	2.9	**6.2**	2.0	0.1	11.2
**Career**		109	1147	40.7%	25.5%	75.1%	2.9	5.3	1.5	0.1	10.5

=== Head coaching ===
Record table
Season	Team	Overall	Conference	Standing	Postseason
**Charlotte 49ers** (Atlantic 10 Conference) (2011–2013)
2011–12	Charlotte	16–14	8–6	6th	WNIT First Round
2012–13	Charlotte	26–6	13–1	2nd	WNIT Quarterfinals
Charlotte (Atlantic 10):		42–20 (.677)	21–7 (.750)		
**Charlotte 49ers** (Conference USA) (2013–2023)
2013–14	Charlotte	15–16	9–7	T-6th	WNIT First Round
2014–15	Charlotte	15–17	10–8	T-7th	
2015–16	Charlotte	19–12	12–6	4th	WNIT First Round
2016–17	Charlotte	21–10	12–6	T–4th	
2017–18	Charlotte	14–16	10–6	T–3rd	
2018–19	Charlotte	18–13	9–7	T–7th	WNIT First Round
2019–20	Charlotte	21–9	11–7	6th	Postseason Cancelled
2020–21	Charlotte	10–12	9–5	2nd (East)	WNIT First Round
2021–22	Charlotte	22–10	15–3	1st (East)	NCAA first round
2022–23	Charlotte	12–19	7–13	T–8th	
Charlotte (C–USA):		167–134 (.555)	104–68 (.605)		
**Charlotte 49ers** (American Athletic Conference) (2023–2024)
2023–24	Charlotte	16–15	9–9	T–6th	
Charlotte (American):		16–15 (.516)	9–9 (.500)		
Charlotte (Overall):		225–169 (.571)	134–84 (.615)		
**Marquette Golden Eagles** (Big East Conference) (2024–present)
2024–25	Marquette	21–11	12–6	4th	WBIT Second Round
2025–26	Marquette	18–12	12–6	T–3rd	
Marquette:		39–23 (.629)	24–12 (.667)		
Total:		264–192 (.579)			
National champion Postseason invitational champion Conference regular season champion Conference regular season and conference tournament champion Division regular season champion Division regular season and conference tournament champion Conference tournament champion
