= LaTonya Johnson =

LaTonya Johnson may refer to:

- LaTonya Johnson (politician) (born 1972), American politician
- LaTonya Johnson (basketball) (born 1975), American basketball player
