= Tombi Bell =

American basketball player

Tombi Bates
Personal information
- Born: April 19, 1979 (age 47) Saint Croix, U.S. Virgin Islands
- Listed height: 5 ft 5 in (1.65 m)

Career information
- High school: Norland (Miami, Florida)
- College: Florida (1997–2001)
- WNBA draft: 2001: 3rd round, 39th overall pick
- Drafted by: Minnesota Lynx
- Position: Guard
- Number: 5

Career highlights
- Second-team All-SEC (2001)
- Stats at Basketball Reference

Tombi Bates (née Bell; born April 19, 1979) is an U.S. Virgin Islands former professional basketball player.

== Basketball career ==
=== High school ===
Bates played for Miami Norland Senior High School, and during her tenure there, was one of the top players in her county.

=== College ===
Bates played for the Florida Gators from 1997 to 2001. She was featured in an April 2001 article for The Gainesville Sun.

Legend
GP	Games played	GS	Games started	MPG	Minutes per game
FG%	Field goal percentage	3P%	3-point field goal percentage	FT%	Free throw percentage
RPG	Rebounds per game	APG	Assists per game	SPG	Steals per game
BPG	Blocks per game	PPG	Points per game	**Bold**	Career high

Year	Team	GP	GS	MPG	FG%	3P%	FT%	RPG	APG	SPG	BPG	PPG
1997-98	Florida	25	1	14.7	.426	.362	.672	1.8	1.8	0.6	0.2	4.1
1998-99	Florida	25	1	14.1	.344	.250	.619	1.7	1.8	0.9	0.2	3.4
1999-00	Florida	34	34	29.6	.371	.294	.677	3.7	6.0	2.5	0.1	7.1
2000-01	Florida	28	27	34.2	.494	.377	.705	4.8	5.0	2.5	0.2	12.4
**Career**		112	63	24.0	.426	.362	.672	3.1	3.8	1.7	0.2	6.9

=== Professional ===
Bates was drafted by the Minnesota Lynx in 2001.

=== Post-playing career ===
Bates spent the 2005–2006 season as an assistant coach of the Miami Hurricanes. Bates later became an NCAA certified referee and a FIBA certified official.

== Personal ==
Bates graduated from Florida with bachelor's degree in exercise and sports sciences with a specialization in sport management in 2002. Bates is the sister of NBA player, Raja Bell. As of 2013, Bates is a physical education teacher at José Martí MAST 6-12 Academy.
