= Kate Paye =

American basketball player and coach (born 1974)

Stanford Cardinal
- Title: Head coach
- Conference: Atlantic Coast Conference

Personal information
- Born: March 6, 1974 (age 52) Woodside, California, U.S.
- Listed height: 5 ft 8 in (1.73 m)
- Listed weight: 150 lb (68 kg)

Career information
- High school: Menlo School (Atherton, California)
- College: Stanford (1991–1995)
- Playing career: 1996–2002
- Position: Guard
- Number: 14, 7
- Coaching career: 1995–1996, 2004–present

Career history

Playing
- 1996–1998: Seattle Reign
- 2000–2001: Minnesota Lynx
- 2002: Seattle Storm

Coaching
- 1995–1996: San Diego State (assistant)
- 2004–2005: Pepperdine (assistant)
- 2005–2007: San Diego State (assistant)
- 2007–2016: Stanford (assistant)
- 2016–2024: Stanford (associate HC)
- 2024–present: Stanford

Career highlights
- As player: NCAA champion (1992); As assistant coach: NCAA champion (2021)

Career WNBA statistics
- Points: 168 (2.1 ppg)
- Rebounds: 98 (1.2 rpg)
- Assists: 140 (1.8 apg)
- Stats at Basketball Reference

Katherine Anne Paye (born March 6, 1974) is an American former collegiate and professional basketball player who is currently the head coach of the Stanford Cardinal women's basketball team.

== Early life and college career ==
Paye was born at the medical center of Stanford University's hospital, and was raised in Woodside, California in a family of Stanford student-athletes. Both of her parents, her sister and brother all went to the school. Her father was a running back for Stanford's football team while her brother John was a guard for Stanford's basketball team and quarterback for the Cardinal in the mid-1980s, and later was her basketball coach at Menlo School. At Menlo, Kate led the team to three consecutive California Interscholastic Federation Division V state basketball championships from 1989 to 1991.

After high school, she was recruited by (and turned down) Harvard University, Princeton University and Dartmouth College. Stanford never recruited her, so Paye attended its women's basketball team training camp as a walk-on and tried out. She was accepted and won a spot as a point guard on the team.

In her freshman year in 1992, she played on Stanford's 1992 championship team and earned a scholarship for the following year.

She graduated in 1995 with a Bachelor of Arts degree in political science.

== ABL and WNBA ==
In 1996, Paye began her professional basketball career with the Seattle Reign in the American Basketball League (ABL) for three seasons until the league folded.

She later joined the Women's National Basketball Association (WNBA) in 2000, and played for the Minnesota Lynx for two seasons. After she was waived by Lynx in May 2002, she signed a free agent contract with the Seattle Storm and played for them in the 2002 season.

During her WNBA career, she spent the offseason pursuing a JD/MBA degree. She graduated from Stanford Law School with a Juris Doctor and the Stanford Graduate School of Business with a Masters in Business Administration in the spring of 2003.

== Career statistics ==
Legend
GP	Games played	GS	Games started	MPG	Minutes per game	RPG	Rebounds per game
APG	Assists per game	SPG	Steals per game	BPG	Blocks per game	PPG	Points per game
TO	Turnovers per game	FG%	Field-goal percentage	3P%	3-point field-goal percentage	FT%	Free-throw percentage
**Bold**	Career best	°	League leader

=== WNBA ===
==== Regular season ====
Year	Team	GP	GS	MPG	FG%	3P%	FT%	RPG	APG	SPG	BPG	TO	PPG
2000	Minnesota	28	12	14.6	.328	.293	.667	1.1	1.4	0.3	**0.2**	1.0	2.0
2001	Minnesota	**32**	**16**	**20.4**	**.385**	.357	**.688**	**1.9**	**3.0**	**0.7**	0.0	1.4	**2.8**
2002	Seattle	19	0	6.0	.368	**.375**	.500	0.4	0.3	0.2	0.0	**0.4**	1.1
Career	3 years, 2 teams	79	28	14.9	.361	.336	.667	1.2	1.8	0.4	0.1	1.0	2.1

=== College ===
Year	Team	GP	GS	MPG	FG%	3P%	FT%	RPG	APG	SPG	BPG	TO	PPG
1991–92	Stanford	30	-	-	23.1	10.5	68.2	1.3	0.8	0.5	0.0	-	1.7
1992–93	Stanford	32	-	-	37.0	31.7	68.8	2.8	2.5	0.6	0.0	-	3.9
1993–94	Stanford	31	-	-	**39.8**	35.8	**75.8**	**3.5**	**5.1**	**1.6**	0.0	-	8.3
1994–95	Stanford	**33**	-	-	37.2	**39.4**	75.5	3.4	4.4	1.3	0.0	-	**9.4**
**Career**		126	-	-	37.2	35.4	73.0	2.8	3.2	1.0	0.0	-	5.9
Statistics retrieved from Sports-Reference.

== Coaching career ==
After graduating from Stanford, Paye started her coaching career in 1995 as an assistant coach at San Diego State University for one season. She left the following year to embark upon her playing career in the ABL.

After her playing career ended, Paye returned to coaching when she was hired as a women's basketball assistant coach and recruiting coordinator at Pepperdine University for the 2004–05 season. She returned to San Diego State the next season as an assistant coach.

In June 2007, Paye returned to Stanford as an assistant coach. On April 16, 2024, she was named head coach following the retirement of long-time coach Tara VanDerveer.

== Head coaching record ==
Record table
Season	Team	Overall	Conference	Standing	Postseason
Stanford Cardinal (Atlantic Coast Conference) (2024–present)
2024–25	Stanford	16–15	8–10	T–10th	WBIT first round
2025–26	Stanford	21–14	8–10	T–11th	WBIT quarterfinals
Stanford:		37–29 (.561)	16–20 (.444)		
Total:		37–29 (.561)			
National champion Postseason invitational champion Conference regular season champion Conference regular season and conference tournament champion Division regular season champion Division regular season and conference tournament champion Conference tournament champion
