= Sophie von Saldern =

German basketball player

Personal information
- Born: 30 March 1973 (age 53) Göttingen, West Germany
- Listed height: 1.85 m (6 ft 1 in)

Career information
- College: California (1994-1995)
- WNBA draft: 2000: 4th round, 49th overall pick
- Drafted by: Cleveland Rockers
- Position: Small forward / power forward

Career history
- 1987-1993: Göttingen
- 1995-1996: Wemex Berlin
- 1996-1997: Brisbane Blazers
- 1997-2002: BTV Wuppertal
- 2002-2003: Delta Alessandria
- 2003-2004: CB Puig d'en Valls
- 2004-2005: BG Dorsten
- 2005-2007: EVO Oberhausen
- Stats at Basketball Reference

Sophie von Saldern (born 30 March 1973) is a former German female professional basketball player.

She is 1.85 meters tall and played on the wing position. She began her career in 1985 in Göttingen, Germany and played a total of 106 times for the German national basketball team from 1993 to 2004. She was the first German player to be selected in the WNBA draft (2000 by the Cleveland Rockers), but was never given a role in an actual game in the women's basketball league in the USA.

After her active basketball career ended in 2007, the Sophie von Saldern, who has a degree in economy and is also an industrial psychologist, began her professional career. She currently works as the head of personnel development and human resources in the industry. She remained connected to sport through various voluntary activities. Among other things, she is involved in the Sportler für Organspende (VSO) association, is an ambassador for the NRW Sports Foundation of the German State of North Rhine-Westphalia and supports the Basketball Aid Association, which helps children with cancer.

She has been married to actor Lars von Saldern since 2008.
