= Georgia Schweitzer =

American basketball player (born 1979)

Personal information
- Born: January 31, 1979 (age 47) Gahanna, Ohio, U.S.
- Listed height: 6 ft 0 in (1.83 m)

Career information
- High school: Bishop Hartley (Columbus, Ohio)
- College: Duke (1997–2001)
- WNBA draft: 2001: 2nd round, 21st overall pick
- Drafted by: Miami Sol
- Position: Guard/Forward

Career history
- 2001–2003: Minnesota Lynx

Career highlights
- All-American – Kodak, USBWA (2001); Third-team All-American – AP (2001); 2× ACC Player of the Year (2000, 2001); ACC Tournament MVP (2001); 2× First-team All-ACC (2000, 2001); ACC All-Freshman Team (1998)
- Stats at Basketball Reference

Georgia Schweitzer (born January 31, 1979) is an American former collegiate and professional basketball player.

Schweitzer attended college at Duke University and graduated in 2001. She began her a professional career with the Women's National Basketball Association (WNBA). On April 20, 2001, she was drafted by the Miami Sol. She would play for the Minnesota Lynx in 2001. While playing in the WNBA, Schweitzer served as an assistant coach for Duke University women's basketball team for three seasons.

After retiring from the WNBA after the 2003 season, she returned to Duke to attend Duke University School of Medicine.

== WNBA career statistics ==
Legend
| GP | Games played | GS | Games started | MPG | Minutes per game | RPG | Rebounds per game |
| APG | Assists per game | SPG | Steals per game | BPG | Blocks per game | PPG | Points per game |
| TO | Turnovers per game | FG% | Field-goal percentage | 3P% | 3-point field-goal percentage | FT% | Free-throw percentage |
| **Bold** | Career best | ° | League leader |

=== Regular season ===
| Year | Team | GP | GS | MPG | FG% | 3P% | FT% | RPG | APG | SPG | BPG | TO | PPG |
|---|---|---|---|---|---|---|---|---|---|---|---|---|---|
| 2001 | Minnesota | 24 | 8 | **17.6** | .314 | .167 | .765 | **2.1** | **1.4** | **0.5** | **0.3** | 0.7 | 3.5 |
| 2002 | Minnesota | **30** | **9** | 17.0 | **.483** | **.424** | **.867** | 1.7 | 1.2 | **0.5** | 0.2 | 0.9 | **4.1** |
| 2003 | Minnesota | 16 | 0 | 7.4 | .353 | .333 | .000 | 1.1 | 0.4 | 0.2 | 0.1 | 0.5 | 0.9 |
| Career | 3 years, 1 team | 70 | 17 | 15.0 | .388 | .286 | .830 | 1.7 | 1.1 | 0.4. | 0.2 | 0.7 | 3.2 |

== Duke statistics ==
Legend
| GP | Games played | GS | Games started | MPG | Minutes per game |
| FG% | Field goal percentage | 3P% | 3-point field goal percentage | FT% | Free throw percentage |
| RPG | Rebounds per game | APG | Assists per game | SPG | Steals per game |
| BPG | Blocks per game | PPG | Points per game | **Bold** | Career high |

| | Team | GP | Points | FG% | 3P% | FT% | RPG | APG | SPG | BPG | PPG |
|---|---|---|---|---|---|---|---|---|---|---|---|
| 1997–98 | Duke | 32 | 247 | 41.5% | 35.6% | 74.1% | 2.8 | 2.3 | 1.3 | 0.1 | 7.7 |
| 1998–99 | Duke | 36 | 360 | **48.9%** | 41.7% | 67.5% | 4.1 | 2.9 | 1.0 | **0.4** | 10.0 |
| 1999-00 | Duke | 34 | **532** | 45.8% | 40.3% | **77.2%** | 4.0 | **3.3** | 1.3 | 0.4 | **15.6** |
| 2000–01 | Duke | 34 | 481 | 47.9% | **41.9%** | 70.2% | **4.7** | 4.1 | **1.5** | 0.3 | 14.1 |
| Career | | 136 | 1620 | 46.4% | 40.1% | 72.6% | 3.9 | 3.1 | 1.3 | 0.3 | 11.9 |
