= Candi Harvey =

American basketball coach

Candi Harvey (born 1954 or 1955) is an American basketball coach at John B. Connally High School since 2012. Harvey began her head coaching career with Robert E. Lee High School from 1980 to 1984 before becoming an assistant coach at Stephen F. Austin University. From 1990 to 1998, Harvey was the head coach of the Tulane Green Wave women's basketball team and Texas A&M Aggies women's basketball team for four years each. With the Aggies, Harvey and her team won the 1995 National Women's Invitational Tournament and reached the first round of the 1996 NCAA Division I women's basketball tournament. In 1998, Harvey briefly worked in the American Basketball League as the coach of the Nashville Noise before the ABL closed the same year.

After moving to the WNBA as an assistant coach for the Utah Starzz 1999, she was promoted as the team's head coach in July 2001. With the Starzz, Harvey and her team made it to the first round of the 2001 WNBA Playoffs and the finals for the Western Conference at the 2002 WNBA Playoffs. After the team renamed themselves as the San Antonio Silver Stars in 2003, Harvey was the Silver Stars head coach until she was fired in July 2003. Harvey then briefly worked in the National Women's Basketball League as a Dallas Fury assistant coach before becoming the coach for Mansfield Timberview High School in 2004. After moving to Connally in 2012, Harvey won her 500th high school basketball game as a coach in 2014.

== Biography ==
In the mid 1950s, Harvey was born in Prescott, Arkansas. For her post-secondary education, Harvey received degrees in education from Ouachita Baptist University and Arkansas State University. While at Ouachita Baptist, Harvey played basketball throughout the 1970s. After completing her post-secondary education, Harvey began her coaching career as a graduate assistant for Arkansas University from 1979 to 1980.

From 1980 to 1984, Harvey coached the girls team at Robert E. Lee High School and had 68 wins and 41 losses. In 1984, Harvey became an assistant coach for Stephen F. Austin University and remained with the university until 1990. In 1990, Harvey became the coach of the Tulane Green Wave women's basketball team and remained with the Green Wave until 1994. With Tulane, Harvey had 46 wins and 68 losses.

Between 1994 and 1998, Harvey had 59 wins and 58 losses as the coach of the Texas A&M Aggies women's basketball team. During her time with Texas A&M, Harvey was the winning coach at the 1995 National Women's Invitational Tournament. After her team won the Southwestern Conference the following year, Harvey and the Aggies qualified for the 1996 NCAA Division I women's basketball tournament. At the NCAA tournament, Harvey and her team reached the first round.

In April 1998, Harvey left Texas A&M to coach the upcoming Nashville team in the American Basketball League. With the Nashville Noise, Harvey had 4 wins and 11 losses before the ABL folded in late 1998. After her time with the ABL ended, Harvey held basketball camps and worked for Fox Sports as a commentator before becoming an assistant coach with the Utah Starzz in mid 1999. In July 2001, she became the Starzz new head coach when Fred Williams stepped down from his position. During the remainder of 2001, Harvey and the Starzz reached the first round of the 2001 WNBA Playoffs and lost to the Sacramento Monarchs. At the 2002 WNBA Playoffs, Harvey and her team made it to the finals of the Western Conference and were defeated by the Los Angeles Sparks.

When the Utah WNBA team moved to Texas after the 2002 season, Harvey resumed her coaching position in 2003 with the newly renamed San Antonio Silver Stars. Harvey remained as coach of the Silver Stars until she was fired in July 2003. As a head coach in the WNBA, Harvey had 36 wins and 22 losses with Utah. She additionally had 6 wins and 16 losses with San Antonio. In 2004, Harvey was working in the National Women's Basketball League as an assistant coach for the Dallas Fury when she was selected to coach the inaugural Mansfield Timberview High School girls basketball team. Harvey had 214 wins and 47 losses with Mansfield before she continued her high school coaching career with John B. Connally High School in 2012. While at Connally, Harvey won her 500th game as a high school basketball coach in 2014.

== Head coaching record ==
Legend
Regular season	G	Games coached	W	Games won	L	Games lost	W–L %	Win–loss %
Playoffs	PG	Playoff games	PW	Playoff wins	PL	Playoff losses	PW–L %	Playoff win–loss %

=== WNBA ===
Team	Year	G	W	L	W–L%	Finish	PG	PW	PL	PW–L%	Result
Utah	2001	19	14	5	.737	3rd in West	2	0	2	.000	Lost Conference semifinals
Utah	2002	32	20	12	.625	3rd in West	5	2	3	.400	Lost Conference finals
San Antonio	2003	22	6	16	.273	(fired)	—	—	—	—	—
Career		73	40	33	.548		7	2	5	.286	
