= Keitha Dickerson =

American basketball player (born 1978)

Personal information
- Born: April 20, 1978 (age 48)

Career information
- College: Texas Tech (1996–1999)
- WNBA draft: 2000: 2nd round, 24th overall pick
- Drafted by: Minnesota Lynx
- Position: Forward

Career history
- 2000: Minnesota Lynx
- 2001: Utah Starzz
- Stats at Basketball Reference

Keitha Latisha Dickerson (born April 20, 1978) is a former professional basketball player who played two years in the WNBA.

== Career statistics ==
Legend
GP	Games played	GS	Games started	MPG	Minutes per game	RPG	Rebounds per game
APG	Assists per game	SPG	Steals per game	BPG	Blocks per game	PPG	Points per game
TO	Turnovers per game	FG%	Field-goal percentage	3P%	3-point field-goal percentage	FT%	Free-throw percentage
**Bold**	Career best	°	League leader

=== WNBA career statistics ===
==== Regular season ====
Year	Team	GP	GS	MPG	FG%	3P%	FT%	RPG	APG	SPG	BPG	TO	PPG
2000	Minnesota	**32**°	**29**	**24.7**	**.380**	.000	**.756**	**4.4**	**1.8**	**1.2**	**0.1**	2.2	**4.4**
2001	Utah	4	0	1.5	–	–	.000	0.3	0.3	0.0	0.0	**0.0**	0.0
Career	2 years, 2 teams	36	29	22.1	.380	.000	.694	3.9	1.7	1.0	0.1	1.9	3.9

=== College career statistics ===
Year	Team	GP	GS	MPG	FG%	3P%	FT%	RPG	APG	SPG	BPG	TO	PPG
1996–97	Texas Tech	29	-	-	**59.3**	0.0	50.6	5.4	0.9	1.0	0.1	-	6.4
1997–98	Texas Tech	29	-	-	47.8	0.0	54.2	3.3	0.7	0.6	0.1	-	4.4
1998–99	Texas Tech	**34**	-	-	50.2	0.0	47.3	7.7	2.4	1.7	0.2	-	8.9
1999–00	Texas Tech	33	-	-	49.2	**25.0**	**55.9**	**10.0**	**3.2**	**2.7**	**0.3**	-	**11.9**
**Career**		125	-	-	51.0	25.0	51.6	6.7	1.9	1.6	0.2	-	8.1
Statistics retrieved from Sports-Reference.

== Honors and awards ==
=== College ===
- 1999 Big 12 honorable mention selection
- All-Tournament team selections
- Big 12 Rookie of the Week for Dec. 9
- Invited to the USA Women's Junior National Team Trials.

== Personal life ==
Dickerson was involved in drama club, speech club, and math-science club while in high school. She majored in Exercise and Sports Science at Texas Tech.
