= 2001 Utah Starzz season =

Women's basketball results

- Head coach: Fred Williams (resigned Jul. 6, 5–8 record); Candi Harvey (14–5 record)
- Arena: Delta Center

Results
- Record: 19–13 (.594)
- Place: 3rd (Western)
- Playoff finish: Lost First Round (2-0) to Sacramento Monarchs

Media
- Television: KJZZ (IND 14)

The 2001 WNBA season was the 5th season for the Utah Starzz. The Starzz entered the WNBA Playoffs for the first time in franchise history, where they lost in the first round to the Sacramento Monarchs.

== Transactions ==
=== WNBA draft ===
Round	Pick	Player	Nationality	School/Team/Country
1	8	Marie Ferdinand	United States	LSU
2	24	Michaela Pavlíčková	Czechoslovakia	Denver
3	40	Shea Ralph	United States	UConn
4	56	Cara Consuegra	United States	Iowa

=== Transactions ===
Date	Transaction
April 19, 2001	Waived Kym Hope
April 20, 2001	Drafted Marie Ferdinand, Michaela Pavlíčková, Shea Ralph and Cara Consuegra in the 2001 WNBA draft
April 30, 2001	Signed Tanja Kostić
May 11, 2001	Waived Tanja Kostić
May 26, 2001	Waived Naomi Mulitauaopele and Stacy Frese
June 21, 2001	Signed Keitha Dickerson
July 6, 2001	Fred Williams resigned as Head Coach
July 6, 2001	Hired Candi Harvey as Head Coach
July 11, 2001	Waived Keitha Dickerson

== Roster ==
2001 Utah Starzz roster
Players
Coaches

Pos.	No.	Nat.	Name	Height	Weight	DOB	From	Yrs
G	8	(United States)	Azzi, Jennifer	5' 8" (1.73m)	143 lb (65kg)	1968-08-31	Stanford	2
G	21	(United States)	Consuegra, Cara	5' 8" (1.73m)		1979-03-04	Iowa	R
F	25	(United States)	Dickerson, Keitha	5' 11" (1.8m)	165 lb (75kg)	1978-04-20	Texas Tech	1
C	12	(Polish People's Republic)	Dydek, Margo	7' 2" (2.18m)	223 lb (101kg)	1974-04-28		3
G	3	(United States)	Ferdinand, Marie	5' 9" (1.75m)	162 lb (73kg)	1978-10-13	LSU	R
F	15	(United States)	Goodson, Adrienne	6' 0" (1.83m)	165 lb (75kg)	1966-10-19	Old Dominion	2
C	54	(United States)	Herrig, Amy	6' 3" (1.91m)	193 lb (88kg)	1977-06-16	Iowa	1
G	7	(Socialist Federal Republic of Yugoslavia)	Hlede, Korie	5' 9" (1.75m)	155 lb (70kg)	1975-03-29	Duquesne	3
F	23	(United States)	Johnson, LaTonya	6' 1" (1.85m)	150 lb (68kg)	1975-08-17	Memphis	3
F	45	(Czechoslovakia)	Pavlíčková, Michaela	6' 3" (1.91m)	175 lb (79kg)	1977-11-27	Denver	R
G/F	30	(United States)	Starbird, Kate	6' 1" (1.85m)	153 lb (69kg)	1975-07-30	Stanford	2
C	24	(United States)	Williams, Natalie	6' 2" (1.88m)	210 lb (95kg)	1970-11-30	UCLA	2

Head coach
(United States) Candi Harvey (Ouachita Baptist)
Assistant coaches
(United States) Tammi Reiss

Legend

- (C) Team captain
- (DP) Unsigned draft pick
- (FA) Free agent
- (S) Suspended
- Injured

== Schedule ==
=== Regular season ===
2001 game log
Total: 19–13 (Home: 9–7; Road: 10–6)
May: 1–0 (Home: 0–0; Road: 1–0)

Game	Date	Team	Score	High points	High rebounds	High assists	Location Attendance	Record
1	May 30	@ Phoenix	W 81–62	Adrienne Goodson (16)	Natalie Williams (13)	Jennifer Azzi (5)	America West Arena	1–0

June : 4–6 (Home: 2–5; Road: 2–1)

Game	Date	Team	Score	High points	High rebounds	High assists	Location Attendance	Record
2	June 2	Portland	L 71–76	Dydek; Ferdinand; Williams (13)	Natalie Williams (10)	Jennifer Azzi (7)	Delta Center	1–1
3	June 5	Houston	L 68–72	Natalie Williams (14)	Margo Dydek (11)	Azzi; Consuegra (4)	Delta Center	1–2
4	June 7	Orlando	W 82–79	Korie Hlede (20)	Dydek; Williams (11)	Jennifer Azzi (5)	Delta Center	2–2
5	June 9	Seattle	L 65–73	Marie Ferdinand (17)	Marie Ferdinand (7)	Jennifer Azzi (5)	Delta Center	2–3
6	June 14	@ Charlotte	W 73–59	Natalie Williams (25)	Natalie Williams (12)	Jennifer Azzi (6)	Charlotte Coliseum	3–3
7	June 21	Sacramento	L 75–87	Korie Hlede (17)	Natalie Williams (14)	Jennifer Azzi (6)	Delta Center	3–4
8	June 23	Minnesota	W 87–80	Kate Starbird (21)	Natalie Williams (14)	Jennifer Azzi (7)	Delta Center	4–4
9	June 25	Seattle	L 47–65	Natalie Williams (14)	Natalie Williams (13)	Jennifer Azzi (3)	Delta Center	4–5
10	June 27	@ Miami	W 68–63 (OT)	Margo Dydek (24)	Margo Dydek (11)	Jennifer Azzi (7)	American Airlines Arena	5–5
11	June 29	@ Washington	L 64–74	Natalie Williams (20)	Natalie Williams (10)	Jennifer Azzi (7)	MCI Center	5–6

July : 8–5 (Home: 4–2; Road: 4–3)

Game	Date	Team	Score	High points	High rebounds	High assists	Location Attendance	Record
12	July 2	Miami	L 59–69	Natalie Williams (22)	Natalie Williams (14)	Jennifer Azzi (5)	Delta Center	5–7
13	July 3	@ Los Angeles	L 71–84	Jennifer Azzi (19)	Natalie Williams (10)	Azzi; Ferdinand (5)	Staples Center	5–8
14	July 6	Cleveland	W 73–69	Natalie Williams (16)	Dydek; Williams (10)	Azzi; Goodson (4)	Delta Center	6–8
15	July 8	@ Portland	W 65–63	Dydek; Williams (14)	Natalie Williams (13)	Adrienne Goodson (6)	Rose Garden	7–8
16	July 10	Los Angeles	L 67–79	Margo Dydek (21)	Natalie Williams (9)	Jennifer Azzi (5)	Delta Center	7–9
17	July 12	@ Sacramento	L 67–69	Dydek; Goodson (20)	Margo Dydek (10)	Jennifer Azzi (10)	ARCO Arena	7–10
18	July 14	Sacramento	W 69–57	Jennifer Azzi (17)	Margo Dydek (14)	Jennifer Azzi (8)	Delta Center	8–10
19	July 18	@ Indiana	W 61–57	Adrienne Goodson (21)	Adrienne Goodson (9)	Jennifer Azzi (6)	Conseco Fieldhouse	9–10
20	July 21	@ Phoenix	L 50–59	Marie Ferdinand (19)	Margo Dydek (12)	Adrienne Goodson (4)	America West Arena	9–11
21	July 24	@ Houston	W 76–67	Marie Ferdinand (16)	Adrienne Goodson (8)	Jennifer Azzi (7)	Compaq Center	10–11
22	July 26	New York	W 71–63	Natalie Williams (17)	Adrienne Goodson (8)	Dydek; Hlede (3)	Delta Center	11–11
23	July 28	Minnesota	W 68–60 (OT)	Marie Ferdinand (17)	Margo Dydek (10)	Dydek; Hlede (3)	Delta Center	12–11
24	July 30	@ Portland	W 79–73	Adrienne Goodson (20)	Natalie Williams (8)	Marie Ferdinand (5)	Rose Garden	13–11

August : 6–2 (Home: 3–0; Road: 3–2)

Game	Date	Team	Score	High points	High rebounds	High assists	Location Attendance	Record
25	August 1	@ Houston	W 71–63	Natalie Williams (18)	Margo Dydek (9)	Jennifer Azzi (6)	Compaq Center	14–11
26	August 3	@ Seattle	W 64–61	Ferdinand; Goodson (15)	Adrienne Goodson (11)	Natalie Williams (4)	KeyArena	15–11
27	August 4	Indiana	W 65–54	Margo Dydek (16)	Natalie Williams (10)	Jennifer Azzi (10)	Delta Center	16–11
28	August 7	@ Detroit	W 76–69	Natalie Williams (26)	Natalie Williams (14)	Jennifer Azzi (8)	The Palace of Auburn Hills	17–11
29	August 8	@ New York	L 63–82	Marie Ferdinand (17)	Natalie Williams (14)	Marie Ferdinand (2)	Madison Square Garden	17–12
30	August 10	Phoenix	W 69–57	Adrienne Goodson (15)	Natalie Williams (12)	Azzi; Goodson (6)	Delta Center	18–12
31	August 12	@ Minnesota	L 62–69	Natalie Williams (18)	Margo Dydek (10)	Marie Ferdinand (3)	Target Center	18–13
32	August 13	Los Angeles	W 80–78 (OT)	Adrienne Goodson (21)	Adrienne Goodson (11)	Azzi; Ferdinand (7)	Delta Center	19–13

2001 season schedule

=== Playoffs ===
2001 playoff game log
First round vs. Sacramento Monarchs
Lost Series: 0–2

Game	Date	Team	Score	High points	High rebounds	High assists	Location Attendance	Series
1	August 17	Sacramento	L 65–89	Natalie Williams (17)	Natalie Williams (12)	Marie Ferdinand (4)	Delta Center	0–1
2	August 19	@ Sacramento	L 66–71	Adrienne Goodson (18)	Adrienne Goodson (10)	Jennifer Azzi (9)	ARCO Arena	0–2

2001 playoff schedule

=== Season standings ===
Western Conference	W	L	PCT	Conf.	GB
Los Angeles Sparks ^{x}	28	4	.875	19–2	–
Sacramento Monarchs ^{x}	20	12	.625	13–8	8.0
Utah Starzz ^{x}	19	13	.594	11–10	9.0
Houston Comets ^{x}	19	13	.594	13–8	9.0
Phoenix Mercury ^{o}	13	19	.406	8–13	15.0
Minnesota Lynx ^{o}	12	20	.375	9–12	16.0
Portland Fire ^{o}	11	21	.344	5–16	17.0
Seattle Storm ^{o}	10	22	.313	6–15	18.0

== Statistics ==
Legend
GP	Games played	GS	Games started	MPG	Minutes per game	RPG	Rebounds per game
APG	Assists per game	SPG	Steals per game	BPG	Blocks per game	PPG	Points per game
FG%	Field-goal percentage	3P%	3-point field-goal percentage	FT%	Free-throw percentage	TO	Turnovers per game
PF	Fouls per game		Team leader		League leader

=== Regular season ===
Player	GP	GS	MPG	FG%	3P%	FT%	RPG	APG	SPG	BPG	PPG
Jennifer Azzi	32	32	37.7	.408	.514	.917	3.1	5.3	0.7	0.3	8.6
Natalie Williams	31	31	34.3	.490	.000	.729	9.9	1.8	1.3	0.3	14.2
Adrienne Goodson	28	25	30.5	.433	.161	.697	5.4	2.1	1.0	0.0	12.3
Margo Dydek	32	32	30.3	.440	.400	.798	7.6	2.0	0.8	3.5	10.9
Marie Ferdinand	32	22	27.0	.493	.262	.611	2.7	2.5	1.3	0.1	11.4
Korie Hlede	27	10	16.9	.390	.348	.868	1.5	1.6	0.9	0.0	5.6
Amy Herrig	32	1	14.0	.462	N/A	.761	2.5	0.4	0.3	0.4	3.8
Kate Starbird	23	7	13.5	.373	.217	.815	1.3	0.9	0.3	0.0	4.7
LaTonya Johnson	26	0	8.8	.262	.167	.786	0.7	0.3	0.1	0.0	1.9
Cara Consuegra	15	0	3.3	.000	.000	.500	0.4	0.7	0.3	0.0	0.1
Michaela Pavlíčková	10	0	2.1	.000	N/A	.500	0.6	0.1	0.0	0.2	0.1
Keitha Dickerson	4	0	1.5	N/A	N/A	.000	0.3	0.3	0.0	0.0	0.0

^{‡}Waived/Released during the season
^{†}Traded during the season
^{≠}Acquired during the season
