= Jana Lichnerová =

Slovak basketball player

Jana Lichnerová (born 15 July 1976 in Bratislava) is a Slovak former basketball player who competed in the 2000 Summer Olympics.
