= List of Stanford Cardinal in the WNBA draft =

The Stanford Cardinal women's basketball team, representing Stanford University in NCAA Division I college basketball, has had 31 players selected in the Women's National Basketball Association (WNBA) draft. Of these players, 15 were in the first round of the draft; two players—sisters Nneka Ogwumike in 2012 and Chiney Ogwumike in 2014—were picked first overall. Another first-round selection, Kiki Iriafen in 2025, played at Stanford from 2021 to 2024 before transferring to USC for her final 2024–25 college season.

Each WNBA franchise seeks to add new players through their respective annual draft. The WNBA uses a draft lottery to determine the order of selection for the first picks of the draft; the teams that did not make the playoffs the previous year are eligible to participate. After the first picks are decided, the remaining teams select in reverse order of their win–loss record. The WNBA requires that players be at least 22 years old during the calendar year of the applicable seasons, have either graduated from a four-year university or have completed their intercollegiate basketball eligibility, or have played at least two seasons for another professional basketball league.

== Players selections ==
=== Allocations ===
Year	Player name	Position	WNBA team (Note: This is the team that drafted the player, not the player's most recent team.)	Notes	Refs.
1999	Kristin Folkl	F	Minnesota Lynx		

=== Regular draft ===
Year	Round	Pick	Overall	Player name	Position	WNBA team	Notes	Refs.
1997	1	3	3	Jamila Wideman	G	Los Angeles Sparks		
1998	2	1	11	Olympia Scott	F/C	Utah Starzz		
1998	4	9	39	Vanessa Nygaard	F	New York Liberty		
1999	1	5	5	Jennifer Azzi	G	Detroit Shock		
1999	2	5	17	Val Whiting	G	Detroit Shock		
1999	2	12	24	Sonja Henning	G	Houston Comets		
1999	3	2	26	Kate Starbird	G	Sacramento Monarchs		
2000	1	12	12	Naomi Mulitauaopele	C	Utah Starzz		
2000	1	14	14	Katy Steding	F	Sacramento Monarchs		
2000	3	8	40	Milena Flores	G	Miami Sol		
2001	4	5	53	Carolyn Moos	C	Phoenix Mercury		
2002	2	13	29	Lindsey Yamasaki	G/F	Miami Sol		
2002	4	10	58	Cori Enghusen	C	Houston Comets		
2004	1	3	3	Nicole Powell	G/F	Charlotte Sting	All-Star (2009); WNBA champion (2005)	
2007	2	10	23	Brooke Smith	C	Sacramento Monarchs		
2007	3	8	34	Kristen Newlin	C	Houston Comets		
2008	1	3	3	Candice Wiggins	G	Minnesota Lynx	All-Rookie Team (2008); Sixth Woman of the Year (2008); WNBA champion (2011)	
2010	1	5	5	Jayne Appel	C	San Antonio Silver Stars	All-Star (2010)	
2011	1	7	7	Kayla Pedersen	F	Tulsa Shock		
2011	1	9	9	Jeanette Pohlen	G	Indiana Fever		
2012	1	1	1	Nneka Ogwumike	F	Los Angeles Sparks	Rookie of the Year (2012); All-Star (2013–2015, 2017–2019, 2022–2025); WNBA champion (2016); WNBA MVP (2016); All-WNBA First Team (2016); All-WNBA Second Team (2014, 2017, 2019, 2022, 2023)	
2014	1	1	1	Chiney Ogwumike	F	Connecticut Sun	Rookie of the Year (2014); All-Star (2014, 2018)	
2014	3	7	31	Mikaela Ruef	F	Seattle Storm		
2015	2	11	23	Amber Orrange	G	New York Liberty		
2017	2	5	17	Erica McCall	F	Indiana Fever		
2019	1	8	8	Alanna Smith	F	Phoenix Mercury		
2021	2	6	18	Kiana Williams	G	Seattle Storm		
2022	1	6	6	Lexie Hull	G	Indiana Fever		
2023	1	6	6	Haley Jones	G/F	Atlanta Dream		
2023	3	10	34	Ashten Prechtel	F	Connecticut Sun		
2024	1	2	2	Cameron Brink	F	Los Angeles Sparks		
