= 2000 Miami Sol season =

- Head coach: Ron Rothstein
- Arena: American Airlines Arena

Results
- Record: 13–19 (.406)
- Place: 6th (Eastern)
- Playoff finish: Did not qualify

The 2000 WNBA season was the 1st season for the Miami Sol.

== Transactions ==
=== WNBA expansion draft ===
Player	Nationality	Former WNBA Team
Kate Starbird	United States	Sacramento Monarchs
Sandy Brondello	Australia	Detroit Shock
Debbie Black	United States	Utah Starzz
Sharon Manning	United States	Charlotte Sting
Lesley Brown	United States	Detroit Shock
Yolanda Moore	United States	Orlando Miracle

=== WNBA draft ===
Round	Pick	Player	Nationality	School/Team/Country
2	19	Jameka Jones	United States	Charlotte
3	40	Milena Flores	United States	Stanford

=== Transactions ===
Date	Transaction
December 15, 1999	Drafted Kate Starbird, Sandy Brondello, Debbie Black, Sharon Manning, Lesley Brown and Yolanda Moore in the WNBA expansion draft
April 14, 2000	Traded a 2000 1st Round Pick, 2000 2nd Round Pick and 2000 4th Round Pick to the Minnesota Lynx in exchange for Marlies Askamp
April 25, 2000	Drafted Jameka Jones and Milena Flores in the 2000 WNBA draft
April 25, 2000	Traded a 2001 4th Round Pick to the Phoenix Mercury in exchange for Shantia Owens
June 1, 2000	Signed Sheri Sam
June 13, 2000	Signed Kristen Rasmussen
November 7, 2000	Traded Shantia Owens to the Charlotte Sting in exchange for Tracy Reid

== Roster ==
2000 Miami Sol roster
Players
Coaches

Pos.	No.	Nat.	Name	Height	Weight	DOB	From	Yrs
C	14	(West Germany)	Askamp, Marlies	6' 5" (1.96m)	198 lb (90kg)	1970-07-08		3
G	31	(United States)	Black, Debbie	5' 3" (1.6m)	124 lb (56kg)	1966-07-29	Saint Joseph's	1
C	42	(United States)	Cassidy, Jamie	6' 3" (1.91m)	187 lb (85kg)	1978-09-12	Maine	R
F	12	(United States)	Colleton, Katrina	5' 10" (1.78m)	145 lb (66kg)	1971-03-17	Maryland	2
G	22	(United States)	Flores, Milena	5' 6" (1.68m)	125 lb (57kg)	1977-10-10	Stanford	R
G/F	5	(United States)	Ford, Kisha	5' 10" (1.78m)	153 lb (69kg)	1975-04-04	Georgia Tech	3
G	35	(United States)	Jones, Jameka	5' 10" (1.78m)		1978-09-13	Charlotte	R
F	7	(Sweden)	Kostic, Tanja	6' 2" (1.88m)	163 lb (74kg)	1972-11-10	Oregon State	1
F/C	50	(United States)	Manning, Sharon	6' 3" (1.91m)	186 lb (84kg)	1969-03-20	NC State	3
F	32	(United States)	Owens, Shantia	6' 2" (1.88m)	175 lb (79kg)	1978-05-16	Kentucky	R
F	52	(United States)	Rasmussen, Kristen	6' 4" (1.93m)	172 lb (78kg)	1978-11-01	Michigan State	R
G/F	55	(United States)	Sam, Sheri	6' 0" (1.83m)	160 lb (73kg)	1974-05-05	Vanderbilt	1
G/F	21	(United States)	Webb, Umeki	5' 10" (1.78m)	162 lb (73kg)	1975-06-26	NC State	2

Head coach
(United States) Ron Rothstein (Rhode Island)
Assistant coaches
(United States) Jenny Boucek
(United States) Tony Fiorentino

Legend

- (C) Team captain
- (DP) Unsigned draft pick
- (FA) Free agent
- (S) Suspended
- Injured

== Schedule ==
=== Regular season ===
2000 game log
Total: 13–19 (Home: 9–7; Road: 4–12)
June: 4–10 (Home: 2–6; Road: 2–4)

Game	Date	Team	Score	High points	High rebounds	High assists	Location Attendance	Record
1	June 1	Indiana	L 54-57	Askamp; Black (13)	Marlies Askamp (10)	Debbie Black (4)	American Airlines Arena	0–1
2	June 3	@ Charlotte	W 74-63 (OT)	Marlies Askamp (19)	Shantia Owens (11)	Milena Flores (5)	Charlotte Coliseum	1–1
3	June 5	@ Indiana	L 59-80	Jamie Cassidy (13)	Shantia Owens (7)	Debbie Black (5)	Conseco Fieldhouse	1–2
4	June 8	Washington	L 51-73	Sheri Sam (11)	Marlies Askamp (8)	Milena Flores (4)	American Airlines Arena	1–3
5	June 10	Minnesota	L 55-66	Sheri Sam (15)	Marlies Askamp (10)	Debbie Black (3)	American Airlines Arena	1–4
6	June 13	Detroit	W 74-61	Sheri Sam (17)	Marlies Askamp (13)	Debbie Black (6)	American Airlines Arena	2–4
7	June 15	@ Houston	L 53-77	Katrina Colleton (10)	Askamp; Sam (5)	Milena Flores (4)	Compaq Center	2–5
8	June 17	Cleveland	W 55-48	Sheri Sam (21)	Owens; Rasmussen (5)	Sheri Sam (5)	American Airlines Arena	3–5
9	June 18	@ New York	L 52-58	Katrina Colleton (19)	Marlies Askamp (10)	Debbie Black (4)	Madison Square Garden	3–6
10	June 21	@ Washington	W 57-55	Sheri Sam (18)	Manning; Owens (6)	Sheri Sam (5)	MCI Center	4–6
11	June 23	Los Angeles	L 54-68	Sheri Sam (19)	Shantia Owens (8)	Milena Flores (3)	American Airlines Arena	4–7
12	June 24	Phoenix	L 44-67	Milena Flores (8)	Kristen Rasmussen (8)	Milena Flores (2)	American Airlines Arena	4–8
13	June 28	@ Orlando	L 53-61	Milena Flores (9)	Manning; Sam (5)	Katrina Colleton (3)	TD Waterhouse Centre	4–9
14	June 30	Orlando	L 63-66	Katrina Colleton (14)	Kristen Rasmussen (9)	Sheri Sam (7)	American Airlines Arena	4–10

July: 6–7 (Home: 4–1; Road: 2–6)

Game	Date	Team	Score	High points	High rebounds	High assists	Location Attendance	Record
15	July 1	@ Fever	W 54-52	Sheri Sam (22)	Marlies Askamp (9)	Sheri Sam (4)	Conseco Fieldhouse	5–10
16	July 5	@ Charlotte	L 70-76	Sheri Sam (26)	Marlies Askamp (6)	Black; Sam (5)	Charlotte Coliseum	5–11
17	July 7	Cleveland	W 49-46	Sharon Manning (13)	Marlies Askamp (8)	Debbie Black (4)	American Airlines Arena	6–11
18	July 8	@ New York	L 51-63	Askamp; Manning (8)	Marlies Askamp (8)	Askamp; Black; Ford; Manning; Sam (3)	Madison Square Garden	6–12
19	July 10	Seattle	W 59-42	Marlies Askamp (21)	Marlies Askamp (13)	Jameka Jones (2)	American Airlines Arena	7–12
20	July 13	Washington	L 48-60	Colleton; Sam (13)	Marlies Askamp (8)	Debbie Black (4)	American Airlines Arena	7–13
21	July 14	@ Detroit	L 50-80	Katrina Colleton (11)	Sharon Manning (9)	Black; Sam (2)	The Palace of Auburn Hills	7–14
22	July 19	Portland	W 69-62	Katrina Colleton (19)	Sheri Sam (5)	Milena Flores (3)	American Airlines Arena	8–14
23	July 21	Utah	W 76-65	Sheri Sam (23)	Sheri Sam (9)	Debbie Black (7)	American Airlines Arena	9–14
24	July 22	@ Cleveland	L 47-76	Askamp; Cassidy (7)	Sharon Manning (6)	Black; Cassidy; Flores; Manning; Webb (2)	Gund Arena	9–15
25	July 26	@ Detroit	L 62-78	Milena Flores (10)	Marlies Askamp (10)	Marlies Askamp (4)	The Palace of Auburn Hills	9–16
26	July 28	@ Lynx	L 44-68	Sheri Sam (8)	Marlies Askamp (7)	Milena Flores (4)	Target Center	9–17
27	July 30	@ Seattle	W 64-51	Sheri Sam (17)	Kristen Rasmussen (9)	Black; Colleton (5)	KeyArena	10–17

August: 3–2 (Home: 3–0; Road: 0–2)

Game	Date	Team	Score	High points	High rebounds	High assists	Location Attendance	Record
28	August 1	@ Portland	L 50-54	Sheri Sam (23)	Marlies Askamp (10)	Black; Ford (3)	Rose Garden	10–18
29	August 2	@ Sacramento	L 55-73	Cassidy; Flores; Sam (8)	Shantia Owens (4)	Umeki Webb (4)	ARCO Arena	10–19
30	August 4	Charlotte	W 60-50	Sheri Sam (21)	Kristen Rasmussen (8)	Sheri Sam (4)	American Airlines Arena	11–19
31	August 6	New York	W 57-41	Sheri Sam (19)	Marlies Askamp (10)	Black; Colleton; Rasmussen; Sam (2)	American Airlines Arena	12–19
32	August 9	Orlando	W 68-64	Sheri Sam (24)	Marlies Askamp (15)	Debbie Black (6)	American Airlines Arena	13–19

=== Season standings ===
Eastern Conference	W	L	PCT	Conf.	GB
New York Liberty ^{x}	20	12	.625	14–7	–
Cleveland Rockers ^{x}	17	15	.531	13–8	3.0
Orlando Miracle ^{x}	16	16	.500	13–8	4.0
Washington Mystics ^{x}	14	18	.438	13–8	6.0
Detroit Shock ^{o}	14	18	.438	10–11	6.0
Miami Sol ^{o}	13	19	.406	9–12	7.0
Indiana Fever ^{o}	9	23	.281	7–14	11.0
Charlotte Sting ^{o}	8	24	.250	5–16	12.0

== Statistics ==
Legend
GP	Games played	GS	Games started	MPG	Minutes per game	RPG	Rebounds per game
APG	Assists per game	SPG	Steals per game	BPG	Blocks per game	PPG	Points per game
FG%	Field-goal percentage	3P%	3-point field-goal percentage	FT%	Free-throw percentage	TO	Turnovers per game
PF	Fouls per game		Team leader		League leader

=== Regular season ===
Player	GP	GS	MPG	FG%	3P%	FT%	RPG	APG	SPG	BPG	PPG
Sheri Sam	31	27	29.2	.387	.292	.670	4.3	2.1	1.1	0.2	12.8
Katrina Colleton	32	32	27.3	.352	.238	.757	2.0	1.6	0.8	0.2	8.3
Marlies Askamp	32	32	27.2	.407	.500	.684	7.2	0.9	0.5	0.7	7.8
Debbie Black	32	32	25.6	.380	.214	.690	2.9	3.1	1.8	0.0	4.8
Shantia Owens	31	16	19.5	.389	N/A	.537	3.1	0.7	0.4	0.8	4.2
Kristen Rasmussen	25	7	18.2	.350	.286	.844	3.8	1.1	1.0	0.6	5.0
Sharon Manning	24	9	16.8	.478	.500	.538	4.2	0.7	1.0	0.2	4.3
Kisha Ford	28	0	15.1	.306	.250	.574	2.2	0.8	1.1	0.0	3.6
Umeki Webb	13	5	15.0	.250	.250	.840	1.1	1.1	0.5	0.3	3.3
Milena Flores	32	0	14.8	.304	.295	.619	0.7	1.5	0.7	0.1	3.5
Jameka Jones	21	0	11.1	.263	.200	.722	1.0	0.5	0.4	0.0	3.3
Tanja Kostic	5	0	9.2	.333	N/A	.500	1.0	0.8	0.4	0.0	1.4
Jamie Cassidy	22	0	8.0	.364	.500	.698	1.0	0.4	0.2	0.1	3.4

^{‡}Waived/Released during the season
^{†}Traded during the season
^{≠}Acquired during the season
