= 2001 Miami Sol season =

- Head coach: Ron Rothstein
- Arena: American Airlines Arena

Results
- Record: 20–12 (.625)
- Place: 3rd (Eastern)
- Playoff finish: Lost First Round (2-1) to New York Liberty

Media
- Television: WAMI (IND 69); Fox Sports Net Florida

The 2001 WNBA season was the 2nd season for the Miami Sol. The team earned its first and only playoff berth, losing in the opening round to the New York Liberty in three games.

== Transactions ==
=== WNBA draft ===
Round	Pick	Player	Nationality	School/Team/Country
1	5	Ruth Riley	United States	Notre Dame
2	21	Georgia Schweitzer	United States	Duke
3	37	Levys Torres	Colombia	Florida State

=== Transactions ===
Date	Transaction
April 20, 2001	Drafted Ruth Riley, Georgia Schweitzer and Levys Torres in the 2001 WNBA draft
April 20, 2001	Traded Georgia Schweitzer to the Minnesota Lynx in exchange for Marla Brumfield
April 30, 2001	Signed Monique Morehouse and Rhonda Smith
May 4, 2001	Waived Monique Morehouse
May 14, 2001	Waived Rhonda Smith and Umeki Webb
May 26, 2001	Waived Jameka Jones and Jamie Cassidy
July 3, 2001	Waived Milena Flores

== Roster ==
2001 Miami Sol roster
Players
Coaches

Pos.	No.	Nat.	Name	Height	Weight	DOB	From	Yrs
C	14	(West Germany)	Askamp, Marlies	6' 5" (1.96m)	198 lb (90kg)	1970-07-08		4
F	28	(Soviet Union)	Baranova, Elena	6' 5" (1.96m)	182 lb (83kg)	1972-01-28		3
G	31	(United States)	Black, Debbie	5' 3" (1.6m)	124 lb (56kg)	1966-07-29	Saint Joseph's	2
G	6	(Australia)	Brondello, Sandy	5' 7" (1.7m)	136 lb (62kg)	1968-08-20		2
G	25	(United States)	Brumfield, Marla	5' 8" (1.73m)	133 lb (60kg)	1978-06-06	Rice	1
F	12	(United States)	Colleton, Katrina	5' 10" (1.78m)	145 lb (66kg)	1971-03-17	Maryland	3
G/F	5	(United States)	Ford, Kisha	5' 10" (1.78m)	153 lb (69kg)	1975-04-04	Georgia Tech	4
F	52	(United States)	Rasmussen, Kristen	6' 4" (1.93m)	172 lb (78kg)	1978-11-01	Michigan State	1
F	0	(United States)	Reid, Tracy	5' 11" (1.8m)	150 lb (68kg)	1976-11-01	North Carolina	3
C	7	(United States)	Riley, Ruth	6' 5" (1.96m)	198 lb (90kg)	1979-08-28	Notre Dame	R
G/F	55	(United States)	Sam, Sheri	6' 0" (1.83m)	160 lb (73kg)	1974-05-05	Vanderbilt	2
C	13	(Colombia)	Torres, Levys	6' 2" (1.88m)		1978-04-06	Florida State	R

Head coach
(United States) Ron Rothstein (Rhode Island)
Assistant coaches
(United States) Tony Fiorentino
(United States) Jenny Boucek

Legend

- (C) Team captain
- (DP) Unsigned draft pick
- (FA) Free agent
- (S) Suspended
- Injured

== Schedule ==
=== Regular season ===
2001 game log
Total: 20–12 (Home: 10–5; Road: 10–7)
May: 1–0 (Home: 1–0; Road: 0–0)

Game	Date	Team	Score	High points	High rebounds	High assists	Location Attendance	Record
1	May 31	New York	W 68–59	Sandy Brondello (21)	Elena Baranova (8)	Debbie Black (7)	American Airlines Arena	1–0

June : 4–7 (Home: 1–5; Road: 3–2)

Game	Date	Team	Score	High points	High rebounds	High assists	Location Attendance	Record
2	June 5	Indiana	W 63–61	Sheri Sam (21)	Askamp; Baranova; Black; Riley; Sam (4)	Debbie Black (4)	American Airlines Arena	2–0
3	June 7	@ Seattle	W 70–57	Sandy Brondello (23)	Marlies Askamp (8)	Sheri Sam (4)	KeyArena	3–0
4	June 9	@ Sacramento	W 71–67	Sheri Sam (21)	Elena Baranova (7)	Debbie Black (9)	ARCO Arena	4–0
5	June 12	Detroit	L 67–68 (OT)	Sandy Brondello (23)	Baranova; Black; Sam (7)	Debbie Black (6)	American Airlines Arena	4–1
6	June 16	@ Cleveland	L 53–70	Sandy Brondello (16)	Elena Baranova (6)	Debbie Black (4)	Gund Arena	4–2
7	June 17	New York	L 48–55	Elena Baranova (22)	Elena Baranova (8)	Sandy Brondello (4)	American Airlines Arena	4–3
8	June 21	@ Washington	W 74–63	Baranova; Brondello (18)	Elena Baranova (12)	Sandy Brondello (6)	MCI Center	5–3
9	June 22	@ Minnesota	L 57–63	Sandy Brondello (13)	Elena Baranova (8)	Marla Brumfield (4)	Target Center	5–4
10	June 24	Cleveland	L 35–54	Elena Baranova (9)	Debbie Black (8)	Marla Brumfield (4)	American Airlines Arena	5–5
11	June 27	Utah	L 63–68 (OT)	Marla Brumfield (12)	Elena Baranova (10)	Brondello; Sam (3)	American Airlines Arena	5–6
12	June 29	Portland	L 72–74 (OT)	Sandy Brondello (20)	Debbie Black (7)	Baranova; Black; Brondello; Sam (2)	American Airlines Arena	5–7

July : 10–4 (Home: 5–0; Road: 5–4)

Game	Date	Team	Score	High points	High rebounds	High assists	Location Attendance	Record
13	July 1	@ Los Angeles	L 60–86	Sandy Brondello (13)	Ruth Riley (6)	Debbie Black (5)	Staples Center	5–8
14	July 2	@ Utah	W 69–59	Sheri Sam (23)	Sheri Sam (9)	Debbie Black (5)	Delta Center	6–8
15	July 4	@ Phoenix	L 47–60	Elena Baranova (12)	Baranova; Sam (4)	Debbie Black (6)	America West Arena	6–9
16	July 7	Sacramento	W 66–54	Elena Baranova (21)	Elena Baranova (7)	Elena Baranova (5)	American Airlines Arena	7–9
17	July 10	@ Orlando	W 65–63 (OT)	Sheri Sam (26)	Ruth Riley (11)	Baranova; Black (5)	TD Waterhouse Centre	8–9
18	July 13	@ Detroit	W 56–55	Sandy Brondello (14)	Ruth Riley (10)	Sheri Sam (5)	The Palace of Auburn Hills	9–9
19	July 14	Detroit	W 66–51	Sandy Brondello (14)	Sheri Sam (6)	Sandy Brondello (6)	American Airlines Arena	10–9
20	July 18	Charlotte	W 68–48	Sandy Brondello (23)	Baranova; Black; Sam (5)	Sheri Sam (3)	American Airlines Arena	11–9
21	July 20	Houston	W 64–50	Sheri Sam (18)	Askamp; Baranova (7)	Debbie Black (6)	American Airlines Arena	12–9
22	July 22	@ New York	W 68–52	Sheri Sam (17)	Debbie Black (8)	Debbie Black (4)	Madison Square Garden	13–9
23	July 25	@ Cleveland	L 48–52 (OT)	Elena Baranova (14)	Kristen Rasmussen (7)	Debbie Black (4)	Gund Arena	13–10
24	July 27	Orlando	W 71–63 (OT)	Sandy Brondello (23)	Riley; Sam (8)	Elena Baranova (7)	American Airlines Arena	14–10
25	July 28	@ Indiana	W 69–63	Sheri Sam (17)	Elena Baranova (9)	Black; Sam (4)	Conseco Fieldhouse	15–10
26	July 31	@ Charlotte	L 45–63	Marla Brumfield (9)	Debbie Black (5)	Brumfield; Ford; Sam (2)	Charlotte Coliseum	15–11

August : 5–1 (Home: 3–0; Road: 2–1)

Game	Date	Team	Score	High points	High rebounds	High assists	Location Attendance	Record
27	August 3	Phoenix	W 72–61	Sheri Sam (25)	Elena Baranova (6)	Debbie Black (5)	American Airlines Arena	16–11
28	August 5	Washington	W 52–44	Baranova; Sam (15)	Elena Baranova (5)	Sheri Sam (5)	American Airlines Arena	17–11
29	August 8	@ Washington	W 42–36	Sheri Sam (15)	Elena Baranova (11)	Black; Sam (3)	MCI Center	18–11
30	August 10	Indiana	W 72–67 (OT)	Baranova; Sam (21)	Baranova; Riley (7)	Black; Brondello (6)	American Airlines Arena	19–11
31	August 11	@ Orlando	W 75–64	Elena Baranova (19)	Elena Baranova (5)	Sheri Sam (5)	TD Waterhouse Centre	20–11
32	August 14	Charlotte	L 41–48	Sheri Sam (14)	Sheri Sam (8)	Debbie Black (3)	American Airlines Arena	20–12

2001 season schedule

=== Playoffs ===
2001 playoff game log
First round vs. New York Liberty
Lost Series: 1–2

Game	Date	Team	Score	High points	High rebounds	High assists	Location Attendance	Series
1	August 17	New York	L 46–62	Ruth Riley (12)	Baranova; Sam (5)	Debbie Black (5)	American Airlines Arena	0–1
2	August 19	@ New York	W 53–50	Sheri Sam (17)	Debbie Black (8)	Sandy Brondello (5)	Madison Square Garden	1–1
3	August 21	@ New York	L 61–72	Baranova; Brondello (18)	Ruth Riley (9)	Debbie Black (4)	Madison Square Garden	1–2

2001 playoff schedule

=== Season standings ===
Eastern Conference	W	L	PCT	Conf.	GB
Cleveland Rockers ^{x}	22	10	.688	15–6	–
New York Liberty ^{x}	21	11	.656	13–8	1.0
Miami Sol ^{x}	20	12	.625	14–7	2.0
Charlotte Sting ^{x}	18	14	.563	15–6	4.0
Orlando Miracle ^{o}	13	19	.406	9–12	9.0
Indiana Fever ^{o}	10	22	.313	7–14	12.0
Detroit Shock ^{o}	10	22	.313	7–14	12.0
Washington Mystics ^{o}	10	22	.313	4–17	12.0

== Statistics ==
Legend
GP	Games played	GS	Games started	MPG	Minutes per game	RPG	Rebounds per game
APG	Assists per game	SPG	Steals per game	BPG	Blocks per game	PPG	Points per game
FG%	Field-goal percentage	3P%	3-point field-goal percentage	FT%	Free-throw percentage	TO	Turnovers per game
PF	Fouls per game		Team leader		League leader

=== Regular season ===
Player	GP	GS	MPG	FG%	3P%	FT%	RPG	APG	SPG	BPG	PPG
Sheri Sam	32	32	34.4	.432	.276	.750	4.3	2.8	1.7	0.3	13.9
Elena Baranova	32	30	30.8	.427	.375	.930	6.0	2.0	1.0	1.8	11.8
Debbie Black	32	32	29.6	.374	.150	.771	3.9	3.8	2.6	0.1	5.6
Sandy Brondello	29	29	29.3	.413	.394	.814	1.7	2.2	1.0	0.1	12.7
Ruth Riley	32	20	25.0	.475	N/A	.771	4.1	0.8	0.8	1.4	6.8
Kristen Rasmussen	28	3	14.9	.360	.250	.750	3.1	0.6	0.4	0.5	2.7
Marlies Askamp	30	11	14.4	.483	N/A	.563	2.9	0.5	0.4	0.4	2.5
Kisha Ford	30	1	13.2	.325	.091	.563	2.2	0.7	0.6	0.2	2.4
Tracy Reid	21	2	13.2	.508	N/A	.615	1.8	0.6	0.7	0.2	3.8
Marla Brumfield	27	0	9.1	.283	.333	1.000	0.9	1.2	0.7	0.0	1.6
Katrina Colleton	14	0	8.6	.256	.000	.600	0.5	0.5	0.1	0.1	1.9
Levys Torres	2	0	4.0	N/A	N/A	N/A	0.0	0.0	0.0	0.0	0.0

^{‡}Waived/Released during the season
^{†}Traded during the season
^{≠}Acquired during the season
