= Katrina Colleton =

American basketball player (born 1971)

Personal information
- Born: March 17, 1971 (age 55) Tampa, Florida

Career information
- High school: East Bay (Gibsonton, Florida)
- College: Maryland (1989–1993)
- WNBA draft: 1997: 3rd round, 19th overall pick
- Drafted by: Los Angeles Sparks
- Position: Guard / forward

Career history
- 1997–1998: Los Angeles Sparks
- 2000–2001: Miami Sol
- Stats at Basketball Reference

Katrina Colleton (born March 17, 1971) is an American former professional basketball player who played 4 season in the WNBA. She played two seasons for the Los Angeles Sparks (1997 and 1998) then after sitting out the entire 1999 season, played two seasons for the Miami Sol (2000 and 2001).

== WNBA career ==
Colleton was selected with the 19th overall pick by the Sparks in the 1997 WNBA draft. Her debut game was played on June 21, 1997 in a 57 - 67 loss to the New York Liberty where she recorded 2 points, 4 rebounds and 3 steals. Colleton played her first two seasons with the Sparks but had a dip in productivity in her second year. From her rookie year to her sophomore year, her per game averages went from 21.9 minutes to 19.2 minutes, 4.9 points to 2.7 points and 2.1 rebounds to 1.7 rebounds.

After sitting out the entire 1999 season, Colleton would sign with the Miami Sol and instantly become one of the team's best players (even being nicknamed Tree by her teammates due to her long arms). She increased her productivity from her sophomore slump, averaging 8.3 points and 2 rebounds in 27.3 minutes per game. She would also be 2nd in points scored in the season for Sol players, along with 2nd in minutes played and 2nd in field goals made. Unfortunately, the team would finish the season 13 - 19 and not make the playoffs.

The next season (2001) ended up being Colleton's final season in the WNBA. She only played 14 games and averaged 8.6 minutes, 1.9 points and 0.5 rebounds. This time around, the Sol would make the playoffs after finishing 20 - 12 but would be eliminated in the first round by the Liberty in 3 games (2 - 1). Game 3 of that first round series was Colleton's final game of her career. That game was played on August 21, 2001, the Sol lost 61 - 72, and Colleton only recorded 2 points and 1 rebound.

Before the 2002 season started, Colleton was traded to the Portland Fire along with her teammate Marla Brumfield in exchange for Vanessa Nygaard on May 22, 2002. However, Colleton would immediately get waived by Portland two days later on May 24. Brumfield herself would be waived by Portland on June 6 and completely missed the 2002 season, meaning that neither her or Colleton ever played for Portland.

Colleton ended her WNBA career with 104 games played with career averages of 4.9 points, 1.7 rebounds and 1.4 assists.

== Career statistics ==
Legend
GP	Games played	GS	Games started	MPG	Minutes per game	RPG	Rebounds per game
APG	Assists per game	SPG	Steals per game	BPG	Blocks per game	PPG	Points per game
TO	Turnovers per game	FG%	Field-goal percentage	3P%	3-point field-goal percentage	FT%	Free-throw percentage
**Bold**	Career best	°	League leader

=== WNBA ===
==== Regular season ====
Year	Team	GP	GS	MPG	FG%	3P%	FT%	RPG	APG	SPG	BPG	TO	PPG
1997	Los Angeles	28	14	21.9	**43.7**	**36.0**	56.7	**2.1**	**1.6**	**1.3**	0.3	1.3	4.9
1998	Los Angeles	30	14	19.2	30.3	26.3	**83.3**	1.7	**1.6**	0.6	**0.4**	1.0	2.7
1999	Did not play (waived)												
2000	Miami	**32**	**32**	**27.3**	35.2	23.8	75.7	2.0	**1.6**	0.8	0.2	2.0	**8.3**
2001	Miami	14	0	8.6	25.6	0.0	60.0	0.5	0.5	0.1	0.1	**0.5**	1.9
Career	4 years, 2 teams	104	60	21.0	35.5	28.8	71.1	1.7	1.4	0.8	0.3	1.3	4.9

==== Playoffs ====
Year	Team	GP	GS	MPG	FG%	3P%	FT%	RPG	APG	SPG	BPG	TO	PPG
2001	Miami	2	0	1.5	0.0	0.0	100.0	0.5	0.0	0.0	0.0	0.0	1.0
Career	1 year, 1 team	2	0	1.5	0.0	0.0	100.0	0.5	0.0	0.0	0.0	0.0	1.0

=== College ===
Year	Team	GP	GS	MPG	FG%	3P%	FT%	RPG	APG	SPG	BPG	TO	PPG
1989–90	Maryland	22	-	-	48.9	0.0	50.0	1.9	0.8	0.2	0.1	-	2.4
1990–91	Maryland	26	-	-	**52.3**	0.0	52.4	3.0	0.2	0.7	0.1	-	6.8
1991–92	Maryland	**31**	-	-	50.9	0.0	**77.6**	3.1	1.7	0.7	0.2	-	6.8
1992–93	Maryland	30	-	-	49.2	**28.6**	77.4	**4.3**	**3.9**	**1.3**	**0.3**	-	**13.1**
**Career**		109	-	-	50.3	26.7	70.1	3.1	1.8	0.8	0.2	-	7.6
Statistics retrieved from Sports-Reference.
