= Marla Brumfield =

American basketball player (born 1978)

Personal information
- Born: June 6, 1978 (age 48) Aurora, Illinois, U.S.
- Listed height: 5 ft 8 in (1.73 m)
- Listed weight: 133 lb (60 kg)

Career information
- High school: Alief Elsik (Houston, Texas)
- College: Rice (1996–2000)
- WNBA draft: 2000: 2nd round, 22nd overall pick
- Drafted by: Minnesota Lynx
- Position: Guard

Career history
- 2000: Minnesota Lynx
- 2001: Miami Sol
- 2003: Charlotte Sting

Career highlights
- WAC Tournament MVP (2000); 2x First-team All-WAC (1998, 2000); 3x WAC All-Defensive Team (1997, 1999, 2000); WAC Freshman of the Year (1997); WAC All-Freshman Team (1997)
- Stats at Basketball Reference

Marla Tanishe Brumfield (born June 6, 1978) is an American former professional basketball player who spent three seasons in the Women's National Basketball Association (WNBA). She was the first women's basketball player from the Western Athletic Conference to be drafted by the WNBA.

== Statistics ==
Ratios
Year	Team	GP	FG%	3P%	FT%	RBG	APG	BPG	SPG	PPG
1996-97	Rice	27	42.0%	30.6%	68.6%	5.889	2.778	0.333	2.222	12.963
1997-98	Rice	30	38.6%	31.6%	63.2%	4.700	2.867	0.300	2.467	13.567
1998-99	Rice	32	36.7%	26.6%	72.2%	5.800	3.156	0.750	2.750	14.500
1999-00	Rice	32	43.6%	28.8%	67.8%	4.250	4.469	0.531	2.781	15.063
Career		121	40.1%	29.4%	68.2%	5.149	3.347	0.488	2.570	14.074

Totals
Year	Team	GP	FG	FGA	3P	3PA	FT	FTA	REB	A	BK	ST	PTS
1996-97	Rice	27	129	307	11	36	81	118	159	75	9	60	350
1997-98	Rice	30	146	378	24	76	91	144	141	86	9	74	407
1998-99	Rice	32	160	436	17	64	127	176	187	101	24	88	464
1999-00	Rice	32	185	424	15	52	97	143	136	143	17	89	482
Career		121	620	1545	67	228	396	581	623	405	59	311	1703

== WNBA career statistics ==
Legend
GP	Games played	GS	Games started	MPG	Minutes per game	RPG	Rebounds per game
APG	Assists per game	SPG	Steals per game	BPG	Blocks per game	PPG	Points per game
TO	Turnovers per game	FG%	Field-goal percentage	3P%	3-point field-goal percentage	FT%	Free-throw percentage
**Bold**	Career best	°	League leader

=== Regular season ===
Year	Team	GP	GS	MPG	FG%	3P%	FT%	RPG	APG	SPG	BPG	TO	PPG
2000	Minnesota	**32**	**17**	**19.2**	**.465**	.111	.690	**1.9**	**1.3**	**0.7**	**0.1**	1.3	**3.9**
2001	Miami	27	0	9.1	.283	**.333**	**1.000**	0.9	1.2	**0.7**	0.0	0.9	1.6
2003	Charlotte	25	0	4.9	.375	.000	**1.000**	0.4	0.6	0.0	0.0	0.2	0.7
Career	3 years, 3 teams	84	17	11.7	.395	.000	1.000	0.4	0.6	0.0	0.0	0.2	0.7

=== Playoffs ===
Year	Team	GP	GS	MPG	FG%	3P%	FT%	RPG	APG	SPG	BPG	TO	PPG
2001	Miami	**2**	0	2.0	**.500**	.000	.000	0.0	0.0	**0.5**	0.0	0.0	1.0
2003	Charlotte	**2**	0	**3.5**	**.500**	.000	**.500**	0.0	**0.5**	0.0	0.0	0.5	**1.5**
Career	2 years, 2 teams	4	0	2.8	.500	.000	.500	0.0	0.3	0.3	0.0	0.3	1.3
