= Levys Torres =

Colombian basketball player

Personal information
- Born: April 6, 1978 (age 48) Barranquilla, Colombia
- Listed height: 1.93 m (6 ft 4 in)

Career information
- College: Chipola College (1996–1998); Florida State (1999–2001)
- WNBA draft: 2001: 3rd round, 37th overall pick
- Drafted by: Miami Sol
- Position: Center

Career history
- 2001: Miami Sol
- 2007–2010: Valle
- Stats at Basketball Reference

Levys Judith Torres (born April 6, 1978) is a former Colombian female professional basketball player.

She competed at the 2011 Pan American Games as a member of the Colombia women's national basketball team.

== Career statistics ==
Legend
GP	Games played	GS	Games started	MPG	Minutes per game	RPG	Rebounds per game
APG	Assists per game	SPG	Steals per game	BPG	Blocks per game	PPG	Points per game
TO	Turnovers per game	FG%	Field-goal percentage	3P%	3-point field-goal percentage	FT%	Free-throw percentage
**Bold**	Career best	°	League leader

=== WNBA ===
WNBA regular season statistics
Year	Team	GP	GS	MPG	FG%	3P%	FT%	RPG	APG	SPG	BPG	TO	PPG
2001	Miami	2	0	4.0	—	—	—	0.0	0.0	0.0	0.0	1.0	0.0
**Career**	1 year, 1 team	2	0	4.0	—	—	—	0.0	0.0	0.0	0.0	1.0	0.0
