= Sheri Sam =

American basketball player and coach (born 1974)

Personal information
- Born: May 5, 1974 (age 52) Lafayette, Louisiana, U.S.
- Listed height: 5 ft 11 in (1.80 m)
- Listed weight: 178 lb (81 kg)

Career information
- High school: Acadiana (Scott, Louisiana)
- College: Vanderbilt (1992–1996)
- WNBA draft: 1999: 2nd round, 20th overall pick
- Drafted by: Orlando Miracle
- Playing career: 1999–2008
- Position: Forward / guard
- Number: 55, 2

Career history

Playing
- 1999: Orlando Miracle
- 2000–2002: Miami Sol
- 2003: Minnesota Lynx
- 2004: Seattle Storm
- 2005–2006: Charlotte Sting
- 2007: Indiana Fever
- 2008: Detroit Shock

Coaching
- 2014–2017: Eastern Illinois (assistant)

Career highlights
- 2× WNBA champion (2004, 2008); WNBA All-Star (2002); Third-team All-American – AP, USBWA (1996); Kodak All-American (1996); SEC Tournament MVP (1995); 2× First-team All-SEC (1995, 1996)
- Stats at Basketball Reference
Medals
Women's basketball
Representing United States
Jones Cup
Gold medal – first place	1995 Taipei	Team competition
Gold medal – first place	1996 Taipei	Team competition

Sheri Lynette Sam (born May 5, 1974) is an American professional women's basketball coach and player who played in the WNBA. She was born and raised in Lafayette, Louisiana as the youngest of eight siblings, and where she was a standout at Acadiana High School. She graduated from Vanderbilt University in 1996. She was an assistant coach at Eastern Illinois University.

== Vanderbilt statistics ==
Ratios
Year	Team	GP	FG%	3P%	FT%	RBG	APG	BPG	SPG	PPG
1992-93	Vanderbilt	24	52.5%	-	48.1%	2.08	0.46	0.25	0.29	3.21
1993-94	Vanderbilt	33	52.1%	50.0%	68.0%	6.24	1.94	0.15	1.39	9.21
1994-95	Vanderbilt	35	53.7%	32.0%	74.6%	8.31	3.60	0.23	2.00	15.54
1995-96	Vanderbilt	30	57.1%	31.7%	75.5%	7.17	3.50	0.17	1.70	20.40
Career		122	54.6%	33.3%	71.7%	6.25	2.51	0.20	1.43	12.60

Totals
Year	Team	GP	FG	FGA	3P	3PA	FT	FTA	REB	A	BK	ST	PTS
1992-93	Vanderbilt	24	32	61	0	0	13	27	50	11	6	7	77
1993-94	Vanderbilt	33	125	240	3	6	51	75	206	64	5	46	304
1994-95	Vanderbilt	35	224	417	8	25	88	118	291	126	8	70	544
1995-96	Vanderbilt	30	244	427	13	41	111	147	215	105	5	51	612
Career		122	625	1145	24	72	263	367	762	306	24	174	1537

== USA Basketball ==
She competed with USA Basketball as a member of the 1995 Jones Cup Team that won the Bronze in Taipei.

Sam was also invited to be a member of the Jones Cup team representing the US in 1996. She helped the team to a 9–0 record, and the gold medal in the event. Sam averaged 13 points per games, the highest scoring average on the team, and was named to the All-Tournament first team.

== Professional ==
=== ABL ===
After her college graduation, Sam played three years for the San Jose Lasers in the now-defunct American Basketball League (ABL), a professional women's league.

=== WNBA ===
Shortly after the ABL ceased operations in 1999, Sam was selected by the Orlando Miracle in the WNBA draft and became one of the Miracle's most productive players that year. Sam was waived by the Miracle just before the 2000 season began, but was signed as a free agent by the Miami Sol. She played three seasons (2000, 2001, and 2002) with the Sol until the team folded due to financial difficulties. After the Sol ceased operations, a dispersal draft was held, and the Minnesota Lynx selected Sam, and she played for the Lynx that season.

During the annual WNBA draft on April 15, 2004, Sam and Lynx teammate, Janell Burse, were traded to the Seattle Storm in exchange for Amanda Lassiter and a first-round draft pick. Sam spent the 2004 season with the Seattle Storm, as the team won the WNBA Finals by defeating the Connecticut Sun, two games to one.

After the 2004 season ended, Sam became an unrestricted free agent. On February 14, 2005, Sam signed with the Charlotte Sting. She would be involved in yet another dispersal draft in 2007 after the demise of the Sting in December 2006. This time, she was selected by the Indiana Fever.

On May 7, 2008, Sheri signed with the Detroit Shock. Her 2008 season with the Detroit Shock was the last of her 10-year WNBA career.

During the 2007-08 WNBA off-season, she played for Elitzur Ramla in Israel. She played for Panionios in Greece during the 2008-09 WNBA off-season.

== WNBA career statistics ==
Legend
GP	Games played	GS	Games started	MPG	Minutes per game	RPG	Rebounds per game
APG	Assists per game	SPG	Steals per game	BPG	Blocks per game	PPG	Points per game
TO	Turnovers per game	FG%	Field-goal percentage	3P%	3-point field-goal percentage	FT%	Free-throw percentage
**Bold**	Career best	°	League leader

†	Denotes seasons in which Sam won a WNBA championship

=== Regular season ===
Year	Team	GP	GS	MPG	FG%	3P%	FT%	RPG	APG	SPG	BPG	TO	PPG
1999	Orlando	32	32	34.0	.388	.328	.688	4.6	2.4	1.3	0.3	2.0	11.4
2000	Miami	31	27	29.2	.387	.292	.670	4.3	2.1	1.1	0.2	2.4	12.8
2001	Miami	32	32	**34.4**	.432	.276	.750	4.3	**2.8**	1.7	**0.3**	2.7	13.9
2002	Miami	32	32	33.5	**.434**	**.342**	.618	4.8	2.6	**2.2**	0.2	2.2	**14.5**
2003	Minnesota	**34**	28	28.0	.383	.329	.705	4.2	2.6	1.1	0.2	1.4	11.0
2004^{†}	Seattle	**34**	32	29.9	.412	.262	**.855**	4.1	2.4	1.6	0.2	1.9	9.1
2005	Charlotte	**34**	33	31.6	.387	.321	.713	4.3	2.7	1.3	0.1	2.9	11.4
2006	Charlotte	**34**	**34**	29.1	.399	.269	.627	**5.1**	2.6	1.6	0.1	2.1	10.6
2007	Indiana	33	4	17.9	.339	.273	.690	2.9	1.3	0.9	0.2	1.2	5.0
2008^{†}	Detroit	32	15	14.9	.309	.286	.692	2.8	1.2	0.6	0.1	1.0	2.9
Career	10 years, 7 teams	328	269	28.3	.397	.302	.698	4.1	2.3	1.3	0.2	2.0	10.2

=== Playoffs ===
Year	Team	GP	GS	MPG	FG%	3P%	FT%	RPG	APG	SPG	BPG	TO	PPG
2001	Miami	3	3	**36.3**	.323	.222	.818	3.3	1.3	**1.7**	0.0	2.7	**10.3**
2003	Minnesota	3	0	24.7	.357	.000	.750	5.3	2.7	2.0	0.0	2.7	8.7
2004^{†}	Seattle	**8**	**8**	31.0	.329	.250	.667	**5.5**	**3.5**	1.3	0.0	3.1	7.4
2007	Indiana	6	5	30.8	**.373**	**.500**	.500	5.3	2.2	1.0	**0.2**	0.8	8.0
2008^{†}	Detroit	6	0	5.0	.286	.000	**1.000**	0.5	0.0	0.2	0.0	0.0	1.0
Career	5 years, 5 teams	26	16	24.8	.342	.273	.690	4.0	2.0	1.1	0.0	1.8	6.5

== Later life ==
Sam served as the assistant coach of women's basketball for Eastern Illinois University from 2013 to 2017. From 2017 to 2019 she was director of athletics, advancement officer, for Mercy High School in San Francisco, and from 2019 to 2020 director of athletics for athletic advancement at the Bay School of San Francisco.

In September 2020 Sam was named the managing director of the Northern California PGA Foundation. Starting March 2022, Sam was the scouting manager of the Portland Trail Blazers. In April 2026, Sam started working for Fox 12 Plus as a studio analyst for the Portland Fire. On October 30, 2026, she was named assistant general manager of the Indiana Fever.
