= Ron Rothstein =

American basketball player and coach (born 1942)

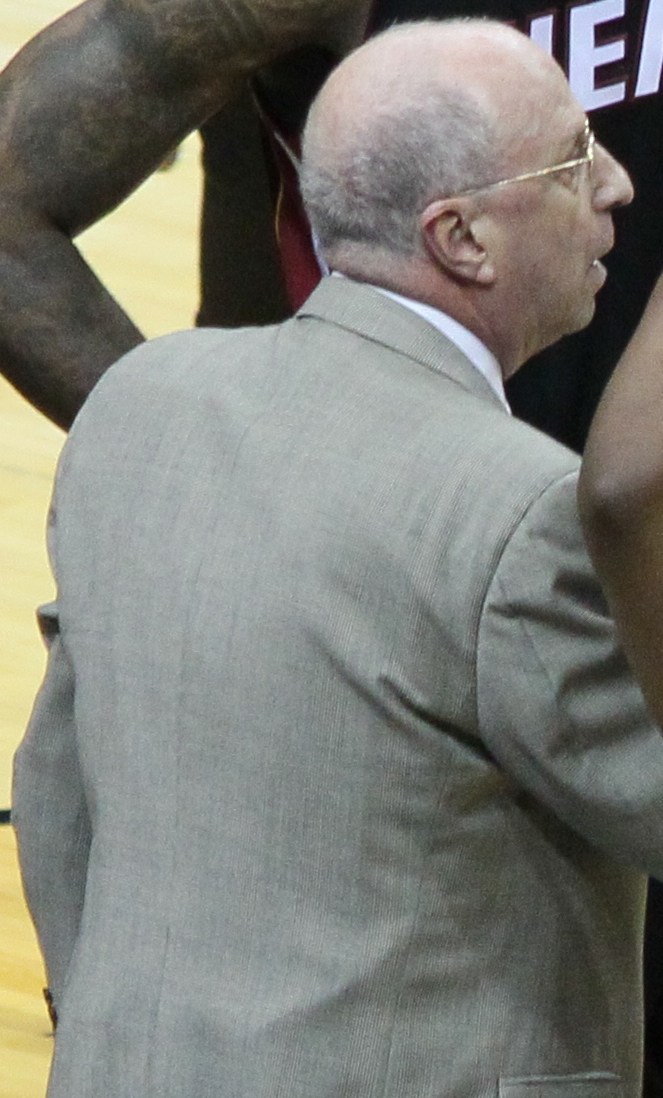
- Rothstein in 2010

Personal information
- Born: December 27, 1942 (age 83) Bronx, New York, U.S.

Career information
- High school: Roosevelt (Yonkers, New York)
- College: Rhode Island (1961–1964)
- Coaching career: 1966–2014

Career history

Coaching
- 1966–1974: Eastchester HS
- 1974–1975: Upsala (assistant)
- 1975–1978: New Rochelle HS
- 1978–1983: Eastchester HS
- 1983–1986: Atlanta Hawks (assistant)
- 1986–1988: Detroit Pistons (assistant)
- 1988–1991: Miami Heat
- 1992–1993: Detroit Pistons
- 1993–1999: Cleveland Cavaliers (assistant)
- 2000–2002: Miami Sol
- 2003–2004: Indiana Pacers (assistant)
- 2004–2014: Miami Heat (assistant)

Career highlights
- As assistant coach: 3× NBA champion (2006, 2012, 2013)

Ronald L. Rothstein (born December 27, 1942) is an American former professional basketball coach and college basketball player, who has led many different NBA teams. He served as the first head coach for the Miami Heat, and later coached the Detroit Pistons. He has also coached in the Women's National Basketball Association (WNBA). In 2007–08, he also filled in for Pat Riley as an interim coach for the Heat.

== Early life ==
Born in Bronx, New York, Rothstein graduated from Roosevelt High School of Yonkers, New York in 1960 and played college basketball at the University of Rhode Island for the Rams. At Rhode Island, Rothstein was team captain as a senior and graduated in 1964 with a degree in physical education. In 1966, Rothstein earned his master's in physical education from Hunter College.

== Family ==
Rothstein is married with two children and four grandchildren.

== Career ==
Rothstein began his coaching career in 1966 at Eastchester High School in Eastchester, New York and would remain until 1976. During the summer of 1967, he was the athletic director at Camp Ma-Ho-Ge in Bethel, New York. He then became assistant coach at NCAA Division III Upsala College for one season and then worked as head coach at New Rochelle High School of New Rochelle, New York from 1976 to 1978. Rothstein returned to Eastchester High for the 1978–79 season and coached varsity basketball and physical education thru June 1983.

In 1979, Rothstein signed as a scout for the Atlanta Hawks and was named assistant coach in July 1983. He was signed as an assistant for the Detroit Pistons in 1986 before becoming the first coach in Heat history (1988).

Rothstein coached the Heat for three seasons, never leading them to a winning record. Rothstein became a television commentator for the Pistons as well as for the NBA on NBC all during the 1990–91 season. Detroit eventually hired him as their head coach for a season, but he was eventually fired. In 1993, he was hired as an assistant coach for the Cleveland Cavaliers, where he stayed six seasons. In 2000, he was hired as head coach and general manager for the WNBA's Miami Sol, where he stayed during the franchise's entire existence (2000–2003). In 2003, he was hired by the Indiana Pacers as an assistant coach. Rothstein would eventually return to the Heat as an assistant.

On January 3, 2007, Rothstein was named as the interim head coach of the Miami Heat in place of Pat Riley, who took a leave of absence for knee and hip surgery.

== Head coaching record ==
=== NBA ===
Legend
Regular season	G	Games coached	W	Games won	L	Games lost	W–L %	Win–loss %
Playoffs	PG	Playoff games	PW	Playoff wins	PL	Playoff losses	PW–L %	Playoff win–loss %

Team	Year	G	W	L	W–L%	Finish	PG	PW	PL	PW–L%	Result
Miami	1988–89	82	15	67	.183	6th in Midwest	—	—	—	—	Missed Playoffs
Miami	1989–90	82	18	64	.220	5th in Atlantic	—	—	—	—	Missed Playoffs
Miami	1990–91	82	24	58	.293	7th in Atlantic	—	—	—	—	Missed Playoffs
Detroit	1992–93	82	40	42	.488	6th in Central	—	—	—	—	Missed Playoffs
Career		328	97	231	.296		—	—	—	—	

=== WNBA ===
Legend
Regular season	G	Games coached	W	Games won	L	Games lost	W–L %	Win–loss %
Playoffs	PG	Playoff games	PW	Playoff wins	PL	Playoff losses	PW–L %	Playoff win–loss %

Team	Year	G	W	L	W–L%	Finish	PG	PW	PL	PW–L%	Result
MIA	2000	32	13	19	.406	6th in East	–	–	–	–	Missed Playoffs
MIA	2001	32	20	12	.625	3rd in East	3	1	2	.333	Lost in Conference semifinals
MIA	2002	32	15	17	.469	6th in East	–	–	–	–	Missed Playoffs
Career		96	48	48	.500		3	1	2	.333	

Preceded by Initial coach	Miami Sol head coach 2000–2003	Succeeded by N/A – Team folded
