= Sandy Brondello =

Australian basketball player and coach (born 1968)

- Brondello with the Australian women’s national team in 2024

Toronto Tempo
- Title: Head coach
- League: WNBA

Personal information
- Born: 20 August 1968 (age 58) Mackay, Queensland, Australia
- Listed height: 5 ft 7 in (1.70 m)
- Listed weight: 136 lb (62 kg)

Career information
- WNBA draft: 1998: 4th round, 34th overall pick
- Drafted by: Detroit Shock
- Playing career: 1992–2004
- Position: Shooting guard
- Number: 6
- Coaching career: 2005–present

Career history

Playing
- 1998–1999: Detroit Shock
- 2001–2002: Miami Sol
- 2003: Seattle Storm

Coaching
- 2005–2009: San Antonio Silver Stars (assistant)
- 2010: San Antonio Silver Stars
- 2011–2013: Los Angeles Sparks (assistant)
- 2014–2021: Phoenix Mercury
- 2017–present: Australian Opals
- 2022–2025: New York Liberty
- 2026–present: Toronto Tempo

Career highlights
- As player: WNBA All-Star (1999); 2× WNBL All-Star (1994, 1995); WNBL Most Valuable Player (1995); As coach: 2× WNBA champion (2014, 2024); WNBA Coach of the Year (2014); 3× WNBA All-Star Game coach (2015, 2018, 2025); Commissioner's Cup champion (2023); Australian Basketball Hall of Fame (2010)
- Stats at WNBA.com
- Stats at Basketball Reference
Medals
Women's basketball
Representing Australia
Olympic Games
Bronze medal – third place	1996 Atlanta	Team
Silver medal – second place	2000 Sydney	Team
Silver medal – second place	2004 Athens	Team
World Championships
Bronze medal – third place	1998 Germany
Bronze medal – third place	2002 China
Head coach for Australia
Olympic Games
Bronze medal – third place	2024 Paris	Team
World Cup
Silver medal – second place	2018 Spain	Team
Bronze medal – third place	2022 Australia	Team

Sandra Anne Brondello (born 20 August 1968) is an Australian professional basketball coach and former professional basketball player. She is the inaugural head coach of the Toronto Tempo of the Women's National Basketball Association (WNBA). She is also the head coach of the Australian women's national team, the Opals.

Brondello played in Australia, Germany and the WNBA before retiring to become a coach. The 5’7” (1.70 m) Brondello is one of Australia's all-time best shooting guards. She played on Australia's national team at four Summer Olympics, has coached the team at two more, and won three medals (one bronze, two silvers) as a player and one bronze medal as a coach. Brondello was inducted to the Australian Basketball Hall of Fame in 2010 and the Sport Australia Hall of Fame in 2026.She is an inductee in the Women's Basketball Hall of Fame's class of 2027.

== Playing career ==
Brondello grew up in Mackay, Queensland, where her parents had a sugar cane farm. At the age of 9, she started to play basketball in a grass court her father built in the backyard Brondello's career began in Australia's Women's National Basketball League, where she was named the Australian Basketball Player of the Year in 1992. Brondello played for 10 seasons in the WNBL, reaching the playoffs on three occasions and being named Most Valuable Player in 1995 as a member of the Brisbane Blazers. She also played between 1992 and 2002 in Germany for BTV Wuppertal, winning ten national championships and the 1995–96 FIBA Women's European Champions Cup.

Brondello started her WNBA career in 1998 by being selected in the fourth round (34th overall) by the newly formed Detroit Shock, becoming an All-Star in the first WNBA All-Star Game in 1999. During the 2000 expansion draft on December 15, 1999, Brondello was selected by the Indiana Fever. She was then traded to the Miami Sol (along with a 2000 first-round draft pick) in exchange for Stephanie White. After sitting out of the 2002 season due to a foot injury playing for Wuppertal during the WNBA offseason, Brondello signed as a free agent with the Seattle Storm in 2003, joining fellow Australians Lauren Jackson and Tully Bevilaqua. Brondello was one of the top three-point shooters in league history, her .410 percentage ranking fourth all-time.

On the Australian National Team, Brondello joined the team before the age of 18 and remained on the Opals for 17 years, and her 302 games made Brondello the third most capped Australian player, behind Robyn Maher and Karen Dalton. Brondello's tournaments with Australia include four World Championships, with two bronze medals, and four Olympic tournaments, with two silver medals and a bronze. Twice she sat out of the WNBA due to Olympic commitments, in 2000 and 2004. The 2004 tournament in Athens turned out to be Brondello's last major event, with her afterwards investing in a coaching career.

== Coaching career ==
=== WNBA ===
In 2005, Brondello was named an assistant coach of the San Antonio Silver Stars. She was promoted to head coach in February 2010.

In 2009 Brondello was inducted into the Queensland Sport Hall of Fame.

Brondello and her husband, associate head coach Olaf Lange, were fired by the Silver Stars in September 2010. Brondello finished her only season as head coach with a 14–20 record, third best in the Western Conference. They were eliminated in the first round of the playoffs by Phoenix two games to none. General manager Dan Hughes regained the title of head coach in January 2011, returning to the dual role he held before promoting Brondello. Brondello would become an assistant coach for the Los Angeles Sparks for the 2011 season.

In November 2013, Brondello was hired by the Phoenix Mercury to replace interim coach Russ Pennell. In her inaugural season, Brondello led the Mercury – which featured a former Opals teammate, Penny Taylor – to the league's top record and highest single-season win total in WNBA history, with 29 wins and 5 losses, earning her a Coach of the Year Award. The Mercury eventually won the 2014 WNBA Finals by sweeping the Chicago Sky.

On 6 December 2021, the Phoenix Mercury announced that the team and head coach Sandy Brondello had mutually agreed to part ways and that her contract, which expired after the 2021 season, would not be renewed.

On 7 January 2022, Brondello was officially named the head coach of New York Liberty.

On 20 October 2024, Brondello took the New York Liberty to their first WNBA finals championship.

On 23 September 2025, the Liberty announced they were not renewing Brondello's contract.

On 4 November 2025, the Toronto Tempo announced the hiring of Sandy Brondello as the team’s first Head Coach.

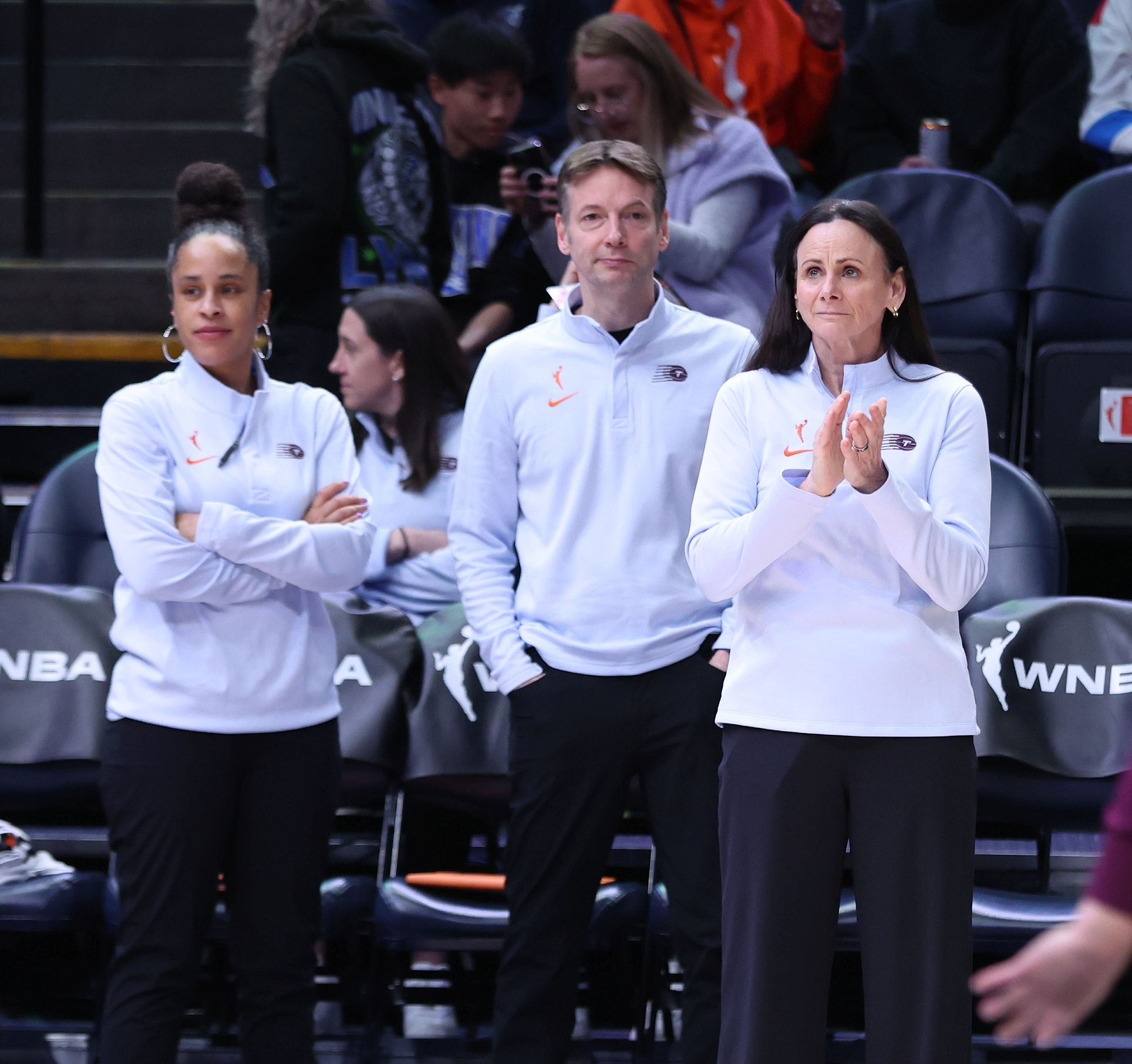
Brondello (right) coaching the Toronto Tempo alongside Associate head coach and husband Olaf Lange, May 2026.

In July 2026, Brondello was suspended for one game by the WNBA, for calling Atlanta Dream player Angel Reese a "protected species". The term, common in Australia, is used to express frustration at a lack of calls against a player but could be seen as having racial connotations in the United States. Brondello apologised for the comment and stated that it had carried an impact beyond her meaning.

=== Australian National Team ===
Brondello became the coach of the Australian Women's national team, the Opals in 2017.

At the 2018 FIBA Women's Basketball World Cup held in Tenerife in Spain, the Australian team were runner-up after being beaten by the US 73-56 in the final.

In 2021, she coached the team at the delayed Tokyo Olympics. The team was knocked out in the quarter finals by the US.

The 2022 FIBA Women's Basketball World Cup was hosted by Australia, and played in Sydney. Australia came third in the tournament, being knocked out by China in the semi final, and winning the third place playoff against Canada.

At the 2024 Paris Olympics, the Australian team won the bronze medal, the team's first Olympic medal since a bronze in 2012. They were beaten by the US in a semi final, and won the third place playoff against Belgium.

In February 2025, her contract with the Australian team was renewed through to the 2028 Olympics.

At the 2026 FIBA Women's Basketball World Cup held in Germany, Australia were eliminated in the quarterfinals by Spain. The depleted Opals lost numerous key players due to injury, leaving 9 players available for their quarterfinal game.

== Personal life ==
Brondello is married to Olaf Lange, who is also a basketball coach and an assistant for the Tempo. They have 2 children, Brody and Jayda. Her son, Brody, plays for Dominican University of California in NCAA Division II.

== Career playing statistics ==
Legend
GP	Games played	GS	Games started	MPG	Minutes per game	RPG	Rebounds per game
APG	Assists per game	SPG	Steals per game	BPG	Blocks per game	PPG	Points per game
TO	Turnovers per game	FG%	Field-goal percentage	3P%	3-point field-goal percentage	FT%	Free-throw percentage
**Bold**	Career best	°	League leader

=== WNBA ===
==== Regular season ====
Year	Team	GP	GS	MPG	FG%	3P%	FT%	RPG	APG	SPG	BPG	TO	PPG
1998	Detroit	30°	28	**33.1**	.428	.364	**.923**	**2.9**	**3.3**	**1.3**	.0	2.1	**14.2**
1999	Detroit	32°	32°	31.3	**.438**	**.487**	.847	2.1	2.3	.8	**.2**	2.3	13.3
2001	Miami	29	29	29.3	.413	.394	.814	1.7	2.2	1.0	.1	1.3	12.7
2002	Miami	30	23	25.4	.365	.318	.821	1.4	1.5	.9	.1	1.3	8.8
2003	Seattle	**34**°	**34**°	28.7	.415	.438	.806	1.6	2.0	.9	.1	**1.1**	8.2
Career	5 years, 3 teams	155	146	29.6	.414	.410	.854	1.9	2.3	1.0	.1	1.6	11.4

==== Playoffs ====
Year	Team	GP	GS	MPG	FG%	3P%	FT%	RPG	APG	SPG	BPG	TO	PPG
1999	Detroit	1	1	29.0	.333	.250	–	3.0	.0	**2.0**	**1.0**	**1.0**	9.0
2001	Miami	**3**	**3**	**35.7**	**.361**	**.300**	**.833**	**3.3**	**2.3**	.7	.0	**1.0**	**11.3**
Career	2 years, 2 teams	4	4	34.0	.354	.286	.833	3.3	1.8	1.0	.3	1.0	10.8

== Head coaching record ==
Legend
Regular season	G	Games coached	W	Games won	L	Games lost	W–L %	Win–loss %
Playoffs	PG	Playoff games	PW	Playoff wins	PL	Playoff losses	PW–L %	Playoff win–loss %

Team	Year	G	W	L	W–L%	Finish	PG	PW	PL	PW–L%	Result
SAS	2010	34	14	20	.412	3rd in West	2	0	2	.000	Lost in Western Conference Semi-Finals
PHO	2014	34	29	5	.853	1st in West	8	7	1	.875	Won WNBA Finals
PHO	2015	34	20	14	.588	2nd in West	4	2	2	.500	Lost in Western Conference Finals
PHO	2016	34	16	18	.457	4th in West	5	2	3	.400	Lost in WNBA Semi-Finals
PHO	2017	34	18	16	.529	4th in West	5	2	3	.400	Lost in WNBA Semi-Finals
PHO	2018	34	20	14	.588	2nd in West	7	4	3	.571	Lost in WNBA Semi-Finals
PHO	2019	34	15	19	.441	5th in West	1	0	1	.000	Lost in 1st Round
PHO	2020	22	13	9	.591	5th in West	2	1	1	.500	Lost in 2nd Round
PHO	2021	32	19	13	.594	4th in West	11	6	5	.545	Lost in WNBA Finals
NYL	2022	36	16	20	.444	4th in East	3	1	2	.333	Lost in 1st Round
NYL	2023	40	32	8	.800	1st in East	10	6	4	.600	Lost in WNBA Finals
NYL	2024	40	32	8	.800	1st in East	11	8	3	.727	Won WNBA Finals
NYL	2025	44	27	17	.614	2nd in East	3	1	2	.333	Lost in 1st Round
TOR	2026	44	11	33	.250	6th in East	–	–	–	–	Missed Playoffs
Career		494	280	214	.567		72	40	32	.556	

== See also ==
- List of Australian WNBA players
- WNBL Top Shooter Award
- WNBL All-Star Five
