= Debbie Black =

American basketball player-coach (born 1966)

Personal information
- Born: July 29, 1966 (age 60) Philadelphia, Pennsylvania, U.S.
- Listed height: 5 ft 2.5 in (1.59 m)
- Listed weight: 124 lb (56 kg)

Career information
- High school: Archbishop Wood (Philadelphia, Pennsylvania)
- College: Saint Joseph's (1984–1988)
- WNBA draft: 1999: 2nd round, 15th overall pick
- Drafted by: Utah Starzz
- Playing career: 1988–2004
- Position: Point guard
- Number: 31, 24
- Coaching career: 1999–present

Career history

Playing
- 1988–1996: Hobart Islanders
- 1994–1995: Launceston Tornadoes
- 1996–1998: Colorado Xplosion
- 1999: Utah Starzz
- 2000–2002: Miami Sol
- 2003–2004: Connecticut Sun

Coaching
- 1999–2000: Vanderbilt (Assistant)
- 2005–2013: Ohio State (Assistant)
- 2013–2017: Eastern Illinois
- 2017–2018: Chattanooga (Director of Operations)
- 2018–2021: Chattanooga (Assistant)

Career highlights
- WNBA Defensive Player of the Year (2001); WNBA steals champion (2001); WNBL champion (1991); ABA National champion (1995); SEABL champion (1991)
- Stats at Basketball Reference
Medals
Competitor for United States
women's national basketball team
Jones Cup
Gold medal – first place	1985 Taipei	Team competition

Debbie Black (born July 29, 1966) is an American women's basketball former player and current coach. During her professional career, Black played in the Women's National Basketball League in Australia, the American Basketball League and the Women's National Basketball Association. She retired from the Connecticut Sun of the WNBA in 2005. Black was an assistant coach for the Ohio State University before being named the head coach of the Eastern Illinois University Women's Basketball team on May 16, 2013, in which position she continued until 2017.

== High school and college ==
Born in Philadelphia, Pennsylvania, Black is a 1984 graduate of Philadelphia's Archbishop Wood High School. She played for Jim Foster at St. Joseph's University and graduated in 1988. While there she helped lead the Hawks to two Philadelphia Big 5 championships and an Atlantic 10 Conference title. A multi-sport athlete, Black earned 12 varsity letters in basketball, field hockey, and softball.

== Professional career ==
=== Australia ===
Black played eight seasons with the Hobart Islanders (1989–96) of the Women's National Basketball League (WNBL) in Australia. She helped the team win the WNBL championship in 1991. She also played for the Launceston Tornadoes of the South East Australian Basketball League (SEABL) in 1994 and 1995, helping the team win the 1995 SEABL championship and ABA National championship.

=== ABL ===
Black played for the Colorado Xplosion and was also an All-Star selection for the ABL. Black is the only professional female basketball player to have accomplished, and is one of very few basketball players (male or female) ever to accomplish a quadruple double (10 points, 14 rebounds, 12 assists, 10 steals); she accomplished this feat against the Atlanta Glory on Dec. 8, 1996. She received Defensive Player of the Year honors in 1997.

=== WNBA ===
Black was drafted 15th overall by the Utah Starzz in 2nd round of the 1999 WNBA draft. During the 2000 expansion draft on December 15, 1999, Black was selected by the Miami Sol. She then played for the Sol from 2000 to 2002. While playing for the Sol, she earned the WNBA Defensive Player of the Year Award at the age of 35. In 2003, Black was acquired by the Connecticut Sun during the 2003 dispersal draft. She played for the Sun until her retirement in 2005.

Throughout Black's basketball career, her energy, intensity, and toughness were well known among her teammates and opponents alike. Her relentless defense earned her the nickname "The Pest." At 5' 2.5", she was the shortest player in the WNBA, just half an inch shorter than Los Angeles Sparks point guard Shannon Bobbitt and just edging out Temeka Johnson. She is a half inch shorter than the shortest NBA player in history, Muggsy Bogues. During 1999 she played on the Utah Starzz with the tallest WNBA player, 7'2" Małgorzata Dydek.

== National team ==
Black was named to the team representing the USA at the William Jones Cup competition in Taipei, Taiwan in 1985. The USA team had a 7–1 record and won the gold medal in a close final against Japan, winning 56–54. Black had 8 rebounds and 3 steals in the competition.

== Coaching career ==
Black entered the coaching ranks as an assistant to her college coach, Jim Foster at Vanderbilt in 1999-2000, with the team advancing to the second round of the NCAA tournament. She rejoined Foster at Ohio State in 2005. Her eight seasons there saw the Buckeyes make seven trips to the NCAA Tournament as she worked as a recruiter and specialist in developing guards. Several guards went on to play professionally in the WNBA or overseas. On May 16, 2013, Black was named the head coach of the Eastern Illinois Panthers. On March 7, 2017, Black's contract was not renewed as head coach of EIU. She endured budget cuts and layoffs during her time as coach and the university did not receive state funds for over a year. There were rumors of the school closing, but on June 6, 2016, President David Glassman sent a letter to the campus community stating the school will not close and that further cuts may come. Through all of this she managed to increase the number of wins the team had in her final season. Most recently she was an assistant coach at University of Tennessee Chattanooga.

== Career statistics ==
Legend
GP	Games played	GS	Games started	MPG	Minutes per game	RPG	Rebounds per game
APG	Assists per game	SPG	Steals per game	BPG	Blocks per game	PPG	Points per game
TO	Turnovers per game	FG%	Field-goal percentage	3P%	3-point field-goal percentage	FT%	Free-throw percentage
**Bold**	Career best	°	League leader

=== WNBA ===
==== Regular season ====
Year	Team	GP	GS	MPG	FG%	3P%	FT%	RPG	APG	SPG	BPG	TO	PPG
1999	Utah	32	**32**	**31.7**	37.8	19.5	62.0	3.5	**5.0**	2.4	**0.2**	2.1	5.1
2000	Miami	32	**32**	25.6	38.0	21.4	69.0	2.9	3.1	1.8	0.0	1.6	4.8
2001	Miami	32	**32**	29.6	37.4	15.0	**77.1**	**3.9**	3.8	**2.6**	0.1	1.6	**5.6**
2002	Miami	32	**32**	28.1	40.0	0.0	75.8	3.8	4.3	1.8	**0.2**	1.0	4.8
2003	Connecticut	**34**	0	11.0	35.3	**33.3**	66.7	1.5	1.4	0.6	0.1	**0.5**	1.6
2004	Connecticut	31	4	11.2	**46.4**	0.0	75.0	1.2	1.5	0.6	0.0	**0.5**	1.8
Career	6 years, 3 teams	193	132	22.8	38.6	19.1	70.4	2.8	3.2	1.6	0.1	1.2	3.9

==== Playoffs ====
Year	Team	GP	GS	MPG	FG%	3P%	FT%	RPG	APG	SPG	BPG	TO	PPG
2001	Miami	3	**3**	**31.7**	38.9	0.0	0.0	**5.3**	**3.7**	**1.7**	**0.3**	1.3	**4.7**
2003	Connecticut	4	0	7.3	**40.0**	0.0	0.0	0.5	0.5	0.5	0.0	**0.0**	2.0
2004	Connecticut	**8**	0	9.1	28.6	**100.0**	0.0	1.4	0.9	0.5	0.0	0.8	1.1
Career	3 years, 2 teams	15	3	13.1	35.7	25.0	0.0	1.9	1.3	0.7	0.1	0.7	2.1

=== College ===
Year	Team	GP	GS	MPG	FG%	3P%	FT%	RPG	APG	SPG	BPG	TO	PPG
1987–88	St Josephs	32	-	-	54.3	31.3	80.0	5.5	6.6	4.7	0.1	-	9.7
**Career**		32	-	-	54.3	31.3	80.0	5.5	6.6	4.7	0.1	-	9.7
Statistics retrieved from Sports-Reference.

== Coaching record ==
Record table
Season	Team	Overall	Conference	Standing	Postseason
Eastern Illinois Panthers (Ohio Valley Conference) (2013–2017)
2013–14	Eastern Illinois	12–16	7–9	T-2nd West	OVC Tournament
2014–15	Eastern Illinois	10–20	7–9	t-7th	OVC Tournament
2015–16	Eastern Illinois	3–25	2–14	12th	
2016–17	Eastern Illinois	9–19	5–11	12th	
Eastern Illinois Panthers (Ohio Valley Conference) (2013–2017)
Eastern Illinois:		34–80	21-43		
Total:		34–80			
National champion Postseason invitational champion Conference regular season champion Conference regular season and conference tournament champion Division regular season champion Division regular season and conference tournament champion Conference tournament champion

== Playing stats ==
=== St. Joseph's University ===
At graduation:

- All-time career leader in assists (718)
- All-time career leader in steals (572)
- All-Atlantic 10 Conference, First Team, 1988
- All-District, First Team, 1988
- All-League, Second-team, 1986
- All-Rookie team, 1985.
- Inducted into the St. Joseph's Athletic Hall of Fame in 2000
- Inducted into the Philadelphia Big Five Hall of Fame, 1995
- Inducted into the St. Joseph's Basketball Hall of Fame, 1994
- Inducted into the Bucks County chapter of the Pennsylvania Sports Hall of Fame, 2010

=== Professional ===
At retirement:

- WNBA - 8th in career steals (315)
- WNBA - 10th in career assists (612)
- WNBA - 1st in career steal-to-turnover ratio
- WNBA - 4th in career steals per game (2.26)
- WNBA - Defensive Player of the Year, 2001
- ABL - All-time leader in steals (330)
- ABL - 2nd all-time in assists (608)
- ABL - Defensive Player of the Year, 1997
