= Kristen Rasmussen =

American basketball player (born 1978)

Personal information
- Born: November 1, 1978 (age 48) Lansing, Michigan, U.S.
- Listed height: 6 ft 4 in (1.93 m)
- Listed weight: 172 lb (78 kg)

Career information
- High school: Okemos (Okemos, Michigan)
- College: Michigan State (1996–2000)
- WNBA draft: 2000: 4th round, 51st overall pick
- Drafted by: Utah Starzz
- Playing career: 2000–2011
- Position: Center
- Number: 52

Career history
- 2000: Utah Starzz
- 2000–2002: Miami Sol
- 2003–2004: Indiana Fever
- 2005: Houston Comets
- 2005: Charlotte Sting
- 2006: Phoenix Mercury
- 2006–2007: Adelaide Lightning
- 2007: Connecticut Sun
- 2008: Minnesota Lynx
- 2008–2009: Panathinaikos

Career highlights
- First-team All Big Ten (2000)
- Stats at Basketball Reference

Kristen Rasmussen (born November 1, 1978) is an American former professional basketball player in the WNBA, also playing for CSS LMK BC Sepsi of Sfântu Gheorghe, Romania.

Born in Lansing, Michigan, Rasmussen attended college at Michigan State University and graduated in 2000. While playing for the Spartans, Rasmussen set the school record for blocked shots with 194. She averaged 12.7 points and 8.2 rebounds per game in her career.

Following her college days, Rasmussen was drafted in the 4th round (51st overall) in the 2000 WNBA draft by the Utah Starzz. She appeared in just 1 game with Utah before being released and signed by the Miami Sol, where she remained through the 2002 season.

A well-traveled player, Rasmussen suited up for the Indiana Fever from 2003 to 2004 and the Houston Comets in 2005. She was traded to the Charlotte Sting on August 1, 2005, along with Adrienne Goodson and a 1st-round pick for Dawn Staley and a 2nd-round pick.

Rasmussen joined the Phoenix Mercury for the 2006 season and signed as a free agent with the Connecticut Sun in 2007. On March 14, 2008, the Lynx acquired her for Tamika Williams. She moved in Athens, Greece, to play for the Greek club Panathinaikos for the 2008–09 season.

== WNBA career statistics ==
Legend
GP	Games played	GS	Games started	MPG	Minutes per game	RPG	Rebounds per game
APG	Assists per game	SPG	Steals per game	BPG	Blocks per game	PPG	Points per game
TO	Turnovers per game	FG%	Field-goal percentage	3P%	3-point field-goal percentage	FT%	Free-throw percentage
**Bold**	Career best	°	League leader

=== Regular season ===
Year	Team	GP	GS	MPG	FG%	3P%	FT%	RPG	APG	SPG	BPG	TO	PPG
2000	Utah	1	0	9.0	.000	.000	.000	2.0	1.0	**1.0**	0.0	1.0	0.0
2000	Miami	25	7	18.2	.350	.286	.844	3.8	1.1	**1.0**	0.6	1.2	5.0
2001	Miami	28	3	14.9	.360	.250	.750	3.1	0.6	0.4	0.5	1.1	2.7
2002	Miami	31	5	21.7	**.552**	.429	**.848**	3.8	1.3	0.6	0.5	1.2	5.5
2003	Indiana	33	25	24.7	.470	.467	.795	3.5	1.9	0.7	0.5	1.5	**6.8**
2004	Indiana	33	4	21.0	.415	.370	.789	3.4	1.4	0.6	0.4	1.1	4.6
2005	Houston	24	19	21.8	.480	.333	.733	3.2	0.9	0.5	0.7	0.8	5.0
2005	Charlotte	3	0	9.7	.500	**.667**	.000	1.7	0.7	0.3	0.0	0.3	2.0
2006	Phoenix	**34**	**32**	**26.7**	.512	.429	.600	**6.1**	**2.1**	0.8	**0.8**	1.0	4.3
2007	Connecticut	33	3	15.8	.414	.556	.810	2.8	0.9	0.3	0.2	1.1	3.5
2008	Minnesota	31	0	12.7	.375	.348	.739	2.7	0.9	0.4	0.2	0.6	2.5
Career	9 years, 8 teams	276	98	19.7	.445	.415	.788	3.6	1.3	0.6	0.5	1.0	4.4

=== Playoffs ===
Year	Team	GP	GS	MPG	FG%	3P%	FT%	RPG	APG	SPG	BPG	TO	PPG
2000	Miami	**3**	0	7.7	.000	.000	**.500**	**2.0**	0.0	0.3	0.0	2.0	0.3
2007	Connecticut	2	0	**19.0**	**.600**	.000	.000	**2.0**	**1.0**	**0.5**	**0.5**	0.0	**6.0**
Career	2 years, 2 teams	5	0	12.2	.400	.000	.500	2.0	0.4	0.4	0.2	1.2	2.6

== Michigan State statistics ==
Legend
GP	Games played	GS	Games started	MPG	Minutes per game
FG%	Field goal percentage	3P%	3-point field goal percentage	FT%	Free throw percentage
RPG	Rebounds per game	APG	Assists per game	SPG	Steals per game
BPG	Blocks per game	PPG	Points per game	**Bold**	Career high

Year	Team	GP	Points	FG%	3P%	FT%	RPG	APG	SPG	BPG	PPG
1996–97	Michigan State	29	243	51.6%	**100.0%**	68.7%	5.4	0.8	0.7	1.3	8.4
1997–98	Michigan State	27	322	50.6%	0.0%	**81.3%**	8.0	1.7	1.0	1.7	11.9
1998–99	Michigan State	**31**	**470**	51.8%	33.3%	79.8%	9.2	3.1	1.4	**1.8**	**15.2**
1999-00	Michigan State	**31**	458	**53.3%**	46.7%	80.2%	**9.8**	2.7	**1.7**	1.7	14.8
Career		118	1493	52.0%	38.5%	78.3%	8.2	2.1	1.2	1.6	12.7

== Personal ==
Rasmussen is married to Australian Jamie Tarr whom she met in Zaragoza, Spain in 2005 .
