= 2007 Connecticut Sun season =

- Head coach: Mike Thibault
- Arena: Mohegan Sun Arena

Results
- Record: 18–16 (.529)
- Place: 3rd (Eastern)
- Playoff finish: Lost in Eastern Conference Semi-Finals

The 2007 WNBA season was their ninth season and their fifth in Connecticut. The Sun attempted to return to the postseason for the fifth consecutive season and were successful.

== Offseason ==
=== Dispersal Draft ===
Based on the Sun's 2006 record, they would pick 13th (last) in the Charlotte Sting dispersal draft. The Sun waived their pick.

=== WNBA draft ===
| Pick | Player | Nationality | School |
|---|---|---|---|
| 12 | Kamesha Hairston | United States | Temple |
| 13 | Sandrine Gruda | France | France |
| 26 | Cori Chambers | United States | Georgia |
| 39 | Kiera Hardy | United States | Nebraska |

=== Transactions ===
- June 8: The Sun sign Evanthia Maltsi.
- May 18: The Sun waive Laura Summerton.
- May 13: The Sun waive Kiera Hardy.
- May 11: The Sun waive Vanessa Gidden and Brooke Smith.
- May 8: The Sun waive Adrienne Davie.
- April 29: The Sun sign Brooke Smith.
- April 25: The Sun waive Monique Martin.
- March 5: The Sun re-sign Laura Summerton.
- February 22: The Sun re-sign Jamie Carey.
- February 21: The Sun trade Taj McWilliams-Franklin to the Los Angeles Sparks for the rights to Érika de Souza and the Sparks’ first pick (12th overall) in the 2007 draft.
- February 21: The Sun sign free agent Kristen Rasmussen.
- February 7: The Sun re-sign Katie Douglas and Le'Coe Willingham.

== Roster ==
2007 Connecticut Sun roster
Players
Coaches

| Pos. | No. | Nat. | Name | Height | Weight | From |
|---|---|---|---|---|---|---|
| G | 10 | (United States) | Carey, Jamie | 5' 6" (1.68m) | 135 lb (61kg) | Texas |
| G | 23 | (United States) | Chambers, Cori | 5' 9" (1.75m) | 155 lb (70kg) | Georgia |
| C | 7 | (France) | Gruda, Sandrine (DP) | 6' 4" (1.93m) | | France |
| F/C | 41 | (Brazil) | DeSouza, Erika | 6' 4" (1.93m) | 190 lb (86kg) | Brazil |
| G/F | 32 | (United States) | Douglas, Katie (C) | 6' 0" (1.83m) | 165 lb (75kg) | Purdue |
| C | 12 | (Poland) | Dydek, Margo | 7' 2" (2.18m) | 223 lb (101kg) | Poland |
| G/F | 21 | (United States) | Hairston, Kamesha | 6' 0" (1.83m) | 146 lb (66kg) | Temple |
| F | 15 | (United States) | Jones, Asjha | 6' 2" (1.88m) | 196 lb (89kg) | Connecticut |
| G/F | 24 | (United States) | Mahoney, Megan | 6' 0" (1.83m) | 160 lb (73kg) | Kansas State |
| G/F | 9 | (Greece) | Maltsi, Evanthia | 5' 11" (1.8m) | 165 lb (75kg) | Greece |
| G | 31 | (Australia) | Phillips, Erin (injured) | 5' 7" (1.7m) | 162 lb (73kg) | Australia |
| F | 52 | (United States) | Rasmussen, Kristen | 6' 4" (1.93m) | 172 lb (78kg) | Michigan |
| G/F | 42 | (United States) | Sales, Nykesha (C) | 6' 0" (1.83m) | 175 lb (79kg) | Connecticut |
| G | 13 | (United States) | Whalen, Lindsay | 5' 8" (1.73m) | 150 lb (68kg) | Minnesota |
| F | 43 | (United States) | Willingham, Le'Coe | 6' 0" (1.83m) | 200 lb (91kg) | Auburn |

Head coach
(United States) Mike Thibault (Saint Martin's)
Assistant coaches
(United States) Scott Hawk (Omaha)
(United States) Bernadette Mattox (Georgia)
Athletic trainer
(United States) Jeremy Norman (Keene State)
Strength and conditioning coach
(United States) Jodi Hopkins (Ohio State)

Legend

- (C) Team captain
- (DP) Unsigned draft pick
- (FA) Free agent
- (S) Suspended
- Injured

== Season standings ==
| Eastern Conference | W | L | PCT | GB | Home | Road | Conf. |
|---|---|---|---|---|---|---|---|
| Detroit Shock ^{x} | 24 | 10 | .706 | – | 12–5 | 12–5 | 14–6 |
| Indiana Fever ^{x} | 21 | 13 | .618 | 3.0 | 12–5 | 9–8 | 12–8 |
| Connecticut Sun ^{x} | 18 | 16 | .529 | 6.0 | 8–9 | 10–7 | 10–10 |
| New York Liberty ^{x} | 16 | 18 | .471 | 8.0 | 10–7 | 6–11 | 10–10 |
| Washington Mystics ^{o} | 16 | 18 | .471 | 8.0 | 8–9 | 8–9 | 8–12 |
| Chicago Sky ^{o} | 14 | 20 | .412 | 10.0 | 6–11 | 8–9 | 6–14 |

== Schedule ==
=== Preseason ===
2007 Game Log: Preseason

| Game | Date | Opponent | Score | High points | High rebounds | High assists | Location/Attendance | Record |
|---|---|---|---|---|---|---|---|---|
| 1 | May 5 | New York | W 61-60 | Hardy (12) | Rasmussen (7) | Rasmussen (4) | Arena at Harbor Yard; N/A | 1-0 |
| 2 | May 8 | Seattle | L 55-63 | Douglas (16) | Willingham (9) | Carey (4) | Mohegan Sun Arena; 5,607 | 1-1 |
| 3 | May 15 | @ San Antonio | L 53-86 | Whalen (14) | Jones (5) | Jones, Carey (2) | AT&T Center; 3,296 | 1-2 |

=== Regular season ===
2007 Game Log: Regular Season
May

| Game | Date | Opponent | Score | High points | High rebounds | High assists | Location/Attendance | Record |
|---|---|---|---|---|---|---|---|---|
| 1 | May 19 | @ Washington | W 89-80 | Sales (20) | Jones, Dydek (6) | Douglas, Jones (4) | Verizon Center; 8,042 | 1-0 |
| 2 | May 23 | @ San Antonio | L 71-74 | Douglas (21) | Jones (9) | Douglas (8) | AT&T Center; 8,574 | 1-1 |
| 3 | May 26 | Los Angeles | L 68-88 | Sales (17) | de Souza (9) | Whalen (5) | Mohegan Sun Arena; 8,003 | 1-2 |
| 4 | May 31 | @ Chicago | W 102-97 (OT) | Jones (31) | Jones (9) | Douglas (7) | UIC Pavilion; 2,634 | 2-2 |

June

| Game | Date | Opponent | Score | High points | High rebounds | High assists | Location/Attendance | Record |
|---|---|---|---|---|---|---|---|---|
| 5 | June 2 | Phoenix | W 76-67 | Jones (24) | Douglas (9) | Whalen (6) | Mohegan Sun Arena; 8,881 | 3-2 |
| 6 | June 8 | @ Houston | W 88-77 | Sales (26) | Dydek (11) | Douglas (6) | Toyota Center; 7,339 | 4-2 |
| 7 | June 10 | Detroit | L 74-79 | Jones (20) | Dydek (9) | Jones (5) | Mohegan Sun Arena; 7,724 | 4-3 |
| 8 | June 13 | @ Minnesota | L 73-77 (OT) | Jones (22) | Jones (10) | Douglas (6) | Target Center; 9,382 | 4-4 |
| 9 | June 15 | @ Detroit | L 72-75 | Sales (18) | Dydek (8) | Whalen (5) | Palace of Auburn Hills; 8,484 | 4-5 |
| 10 | June 17 | Chicago | L 74-87 | Jones (22) | Jones (12) | Douglas (5) | Mohegan Sun Arena; 7,614 | 4-6 |
| 11 | June 20 | New York | L 73-76 | Douglas, Sales (17) | Whalen (8) | Whalen (10) | Mohegan Sun Arena; 6,154 | 4-7 |
| 12 | June 22 | @ Indiana | W 78-74 | Douglas (30) | Dydek (10) | Whalen (7) | Conseco Fieldhouse; 7,240 | 5-7 |
| 13 | June 23 | San Antonio | L 58-71 | Douglas, Whalen (15) | Dydek (8) | Douglas (3) | Mohegan Sun Arena; 6,887 | 5-8 |
| 14 | June 26 | Washington | L 75-91 | Douglas (19) | Dydek (10) | Whalen (6) | Mohegan Sun Arena; 6,353 | 5-9 |
| 15 | June 27 | @ Detroit | L 74-77 | Jones (16) | Jones (9) | Douglas, Whalen (4) | Palace of Auburn Hills; 8,521 | 5-10 |
| 16 | June 29 | Indiana | W 72-67 | Douglas (22) | Dydek (13) | Whalen (7) | Mohegan Sun Arena; 7,617 | 6-10 |

July

| Game | Date | Opponent | Score | High points | High rebounds | High assists | Location/Attendance | Record |
|---|---|---|---|---|---|---|---|---|
| 17 | July 6 | @ Phoenix | L 109-111 (2 OT) | Jones, Sales (22) | Rasmussen (13) | Jones (6) | US Airways Center; 7,131 | 6-11 |
| 18 | July 7 | @ Los Angeles | W 110-89 | Douglas (28) | Dydek (7) | Whalen (8) | STAPLES Center; 8,769 | 7-11 |
| 19 | July 11 | @ Seattle | W 76-63 | Douglas (17) | Jones (9) | Whalen, Douglas (4) | KeyArena; 10,891 | 8-11 |
| 20 | July 12 | @ Sacramento | W 82-78 (OT) | Sales (23) | Dydek (9) | Whalen (8) | ARCO Arena; 6,498 | 9-11 |
| 21 | July 17 | Minnesota | W 84-79 | Douglas (22) | Sales, Dydek, Willingham (5) | Whalen, Sales (4) | Mohegan Sun Arena; 8,253 | 10-11 |
| 22 | July 20 | Seattle | W 76-58 | Whalen (19) | Jones (10) | Douglas (6) | Mohegan Sun Arena; 9,003 | 11-11 |
| 23 | July 22 | Houston | W 81-79 | Douglas (25) | Douglas, Whalen, Dydek (6) | Whalen (6) | Mohegan Sun Arena; 7,869 | 12-11 |
| 24 | July 24 | Detroit | L 88-92 | Whalen (33) | de Souza (9) | Whalen (7) | Mohegan Sun Arena; 8,192 | 13-11 |
| 25 | July 26 | New York | W 79-75 | Whalen (20) | Whalen, de Souza (9) | Whalen (8) | Mohegan Sun Arena; N/A | 14-11 |
| 26 | July 29 | @ New York | L 67-61 | Douglas (26) | Maltsi (8) | Jones (4) | Madison Square Garden; 8,303 | 14-12 |
| 27 | July 31 | Chicago | W 74-56 | Douglas (18) | Jones (9) | Sales (5) | Mohegan Sun Arena; 8,048 | 15-12 |

August

| Game | Date | Opponent | Score | High points | High rebounds | High assists | Location/Attendance | Record |
|---|---|---|---|---|---|---|---|---|
| 28 | August 4 | Indiana | W 84-59 | Douglas (19) | Dydek (9) | Douglas (5) | Mohegan Sun Arena; 9,493 | 16-12 |
| 29 | August 7 | Sacramento | L 79-81 | Whalen, Jones (17) | Jones (6) | Whalen (7) | Mohegan Sun Arena; 8,930 | 16-13 |
| 30 | August 11 | @ Chicago | W 88-66 | Dydek (18) | Dydek (6) | Whalen (7) | UIC Pavilion; 4,261 | 17-13 |
| 31 | August 14 | @ Washington | L 64-65 | Dydek (17) | Dydek (11) | Whalen (5) | Verizon Center; N/A | 17-14 |
| 32 | August 15 | @ Indiana | W 77-74 | Sales (32) | de Souza (6) | Rasmussen (3) | Conseco Fieldhouse; 6,433 | 18-14 |
| 33 | August 17 | @ New York | L 66-74 | Douglas (22) | Whalen, Rasmussen, Willingham (5) | Whalen (4) | Madison Square Garden; 8,622 | 18-15 |
| 34 | August 19 | Washington | L 74-76 | Douglas (21) | Douglas (9) | Whalen (7) | Mohegan Sun Arena; 9,518 (sellout) | 18-16 |

=== Playoffs ===
In the first round of the Eastern Conference Playoffs, the Sun had to face the Indiana Fever. Since the Fever had the better record, the series would be played with game 1 at Connecticut, game 2 at Indiana, and game 3 (if needed) at Indiana. The Sun won the first game at home in triple-overtime, but the Fever went on to win games two and three and take the series.

- For the fifth consecutive season, the Sun qualify for the Eastern Conference Playoffs.
- For the first time in franchise history, the Sun lose in the first round of the playoffs and do not advance to the Eastern Conference Finals.

2007 Game Log: Postseason
Eastern Conference Semifinals

| Game | Date | Opponent | Score | High points | High rebounds | High assists | Location/Attendance | Series |
|---|---|---|---|---|---|---|---|---|
| 1 | August 23 | Indiana | W 93-88 (3 OT) | Sales (25) | Dydek (11) | Whalen (10) | Mohegan Sun Arena; 7,271 | 1-0 |
| 2 | August 25 | @ Indiana | L 59-78 | Douglas (11) | Sales (6) | Carey (4) | Conseco Fieldhouse; 7,298 | 1-1 |
| 3 | August 27 | @ Indiana | L 88-93 (OT) | Douglas (27) | Whalen (10) | Douglas, Jones (5) | Conseco Fieldhouse; 6,012 | 1-2 |

== Depth ==
| Pos. | Starter | Bench | Inactive |
|---|---|---|---|
| C | Margo Dydek | Érika de Souza | Sandrine Gruda |
| PF | Asjha Jones | Kristen Rasmussen -- Le'Coe Willingham |
| SF | Nykesha Sales | Evanthia Maltsi -- Megan Mahoney |
| SG | Katie Douglas | Kamesha Hairston | Cori Chambers |
| PG | Lindsay Whalen | Jamie Carey | Erin Phillips |

== Player stats ==
- http://www.wnba.com/sun/stats/2007/

== Awards and honors ==
- Katie Douglas and Asjha Jones were named reserves for the 2007 Eastern Conference All-Star Team.
- Katie Douglas was named to the WNBA All-Defensive First Team for the third consecutive year.
- Margo Dydek was named to the WNBA All-Defensive Second Team for the second consecutive year.
- Katie Douglas was named to the All-WNBA Second Team.
- Asjha Jones was named WNBA Eastern Conference Player of the Week for the week of June 4, 2007.
- Lindsay Whalen was named WNBA Eastern Conference Player of the Week for the week of July 23, 2007.
- Katie Douglas was named WNBA Eastern Conference Player of the Week for the week of July 30, 2007.
