= Kamesha Hairston =

American basketball player (born 1985)

Temple university
- Position: Small forward
- League: WNBA

Personal information
- Born: August 18, 1985 (age 41) Toledo, Ohio, U.S.
- Listed height: 6 ft 0 in (1.83 m)
- Listed weight: 146 lb (66 kg)

Career information
- High school: Bowsher (Toledo, Ohio)
- College: Temple (2003–2007)
- WNBA draft: 2007: 1st round, 12th overall pick
- Drafted by: Connecticut Sun
- Playing career: 2007–2008

Career history
- 2007–2008: Connecticut Sun

Career highlights
- Atlantic 10 Player of the Year (2007); 2× First-team All-Atlantic 10 (2006, 2007); Atlantic 10 Most Improved Player (2005); 3× Atlantic 10 All-Defensive team (2005–2007)
- Stats at Basketball Reference

Kamesha Hairston (born August 18, 1985, in Toledo, Ohio) is an American professional women's basketball player. In the 2007 and 2008 seasons she played for the Connecticut Sun. She retired from the game around 2014 due to injury. In 2019, she was inducted into the Philadelphia Big 5 Hall of Fame.

== College career ==
Coached under WNBA player Dawn Staley, Hairston was the second scoring option in her first three years because of former Temple University and current Indiana Fever forward Candice Dupree. Hairston still had a good junior season, averaging 12.8 points per game. In the 2006–2007 season she was finally the star player of Temple University as she had a breakout year, averaging 18.9 points per game with 8.9 rebounds per game. In the 2007 Tournament, her final game was against Lindsey Harding, who led Duke, as Temple lost the game 62–52.

== Career statistics ==
Legend
GP	Games played	GS	Games started	MPG	Minutes per game	RPG	Rebounds per game
APG	Assists per game	SPG	Steals per game	BPG	Blocks per game	PPG	Points per game
TO	Turnovers per game	FG%	Field-goal percentage	3P%	3-point field-goal percentage	FT%	Free-throw percentage
**Bold**	Career best	°	League leader

=== WNBA ===
==== Regular season ====
Year	Team	GP	GS	MPG	FG%	3P%	FT%	RPG	APG	SPG	BPG	TO	PPG
2007	Connecticut	17	0	8.7	24.4	25.0	75.0	1.8	0.4	0.4	0.0	0.5	1.9
Career	1 year, 1 team	17	0	8.7	24.4	25.0	75.0	1.8	0.4	0.4	0.0	0.5	1.9

=== College ===
Legend
GP	Games played	GS	Games started	MPG	Minutes per game
FG%	Field goal percentage	3P%	3-point field goal percentage	FT%	Free throw percentage
RPG	Rebounds per game	APG	Assists per game	SPG	Steals per game
BPG	Blocks per game	PPG	Points per game	**Bold**	Career high

Year	Team	GP	Points	FG%	3P%	FT%	RPG	APG	SPG	BPG	PPG
2003–04	Temple	31	136	47.1	33.3	45.0	2.6	1.0	1.2	0.4	4.4
2004–05	Temple	32	401	**49.2**	33.3	67.9	6.1	1.6	**2.2**	0.5	12.5
2005–06	Temple	32	411	42.1	21.6	**80.4**	6.1	1.8	2.1	**0.8**	12.8
2006–07	Temple	**33**	**625**	44.5	**35.4**	78.2	**8.6**	**2.0**	1.8	**0.8**	**18.9**°
Career		128	1573	45.2	28.3	72.7	5.9	1.6	1.8	0.6	12.3
