= Jameka Jones =

American basketball player

Personal information
- Born: September 13, 1978 (age 48) Kinston, North Carolina, U.S.

Career information
- High school: Kinston High School
- College: University of North Carolina at Charlotte
- WNBA draft: 2000: 2nd round, 19th overall pick
- Drafted by: Miami Sol
- Position: Guard

Career history
- 2000: Miami Sol
- Stats at Basketball Reference

Jameka Jones (born September 13, 1978) is an American former professional basketball player for the Miami Sol of the Women's National Basketball Association.

== WNBA ==
In 2000, Jones became the second player ever from UNCC to play in the WNBA, joining Markita Aldridge.

== Honors and awards ==
- C-USA all-tournament team
