= Carolyn Moos =

American basketball player

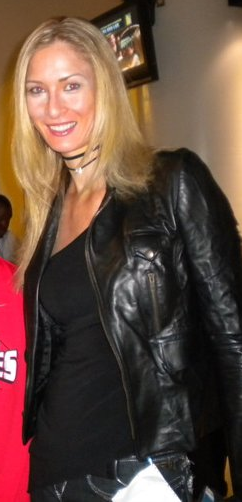
- Moos, 2010

Personal information
- Born: May 23, 1978 (age 48) Minneapolis, Minnesota, U.S.
- Listed height: 6 ft 5 in (1.96 m)

Career information
- High school: The Blake School (Minneapolis, Minnesota)
- College: Stanford (1997–2001)
- WNBA draft: 2001: 4th round, 53rd overall pick
- Drafted by: Phoenix Mercury
- Position: Center
- Number: 53

Career history
- 2002: Miami Sol
- Stats at Basketball Reference
Medals
Women's basketball
Representing United States
FIBA Under-19 World Cup
Gold medal – first place	1997 Brazil	Team
FIBA Under-18 Americas Championship
Silver medal – second place	1996 Mexico	Team

Carolyn Moos (/ˈmuːs/; born May 23, 1978) is an American former collegiate and professional basketball player.

Moos won a gold medal playing for the United States in the Junior Olympics traveling to Frankfurt, Slovakia, Brazil and Chetumal. She lived in France for a time where she played professional basketball after completing her B.A. at Stanford. In the WNBA she played for Miami Sol (2002). Moos has an M.A. from USC and is a nutritional consultant and personal trainer.

== Early life and high school ==
Moos was born on May 23, 1978, in Minneapolis, Minnesota. She is the daughter of Melinda and Charles Moos. She has an older brother, Dan Moos. During her youth, she was a dedicated show horse jumper from the age of nine until she turned thirteen, along with enjoying tennis, soccer, hockey, swimming and dance.

She began playing basketball in the sixth grade as even in her youth, she was quite tall, standing over six feet tall at 13 years old. She was influenced by her family and her older brother Dan and was later approached by her school's coach, Julie Grim, who later became her mentor, and who convinced her to play the game. She played for the North Tartan AAU team that won nationals and earned the Sporting News Top Student Athletes in the Country among other awards.

Moos played for The Blake School in Minneapolis, Minnesota, where she was named a WBCA All-American. She participated in the WBCA High School All-America Game where she scored eight points.

Moos was also one of the finalists for the Naismith National Player of the Year in 1997, some of which joined her on the USA Jr. Olympic team that won a gold in Brazil.

She totaled 2,040 points and 1,360 rebounds in four years, while shooting 62.0% from the field. She also scored 50.0% from three-point range. As a senior, Moos averaged 19 points, nine rebounds, four assists and four blocks per game. She graduated from Blake School in 1997.

== USA Basketball ==
Moos was named to the USA Basketball Women's Junior National Team (now called the U18 team). The team participated in the Americas zone qualifying tournament, now known as the FIBA Americas U18 Championshio, held in Chetumal, Mexico in late August and early September 1996. The US team won its early games easily, but lost by four points to the team from Brazil, ending up with the silver medal for the event.

Moos was also in the USA Junior World Championship Team when it was invited to the 1997 FIBA Junior World Championship (now called U19) held in Natal, Brazil. After beating Japan in the preliminary round, the next game was against Australia, the defending champion. The US team pulled out to a 13-point lead in the second half, but gave up the lead and lost the game 80–74. The US rebounded with a close 92–88 victory over Cuba, helped by 23 points each from Maylana Martin and Lynn Pride. The US then beat previously unbeaten Russia. After winning the next two games, they faced Australia in the gold medal game. The USA team has a three-point lead late, but the Aussies hit a 3-pointer with three seconds left in regulation to force overtime. Although the Aussies scored first, the US came back, then pulled into the lead and held on to win 78–74 to earn the gold, and the first gold for a US team at a FIBA Junior World Championship. Moos averaged 2.0 points per game.

== College ==
Moos attended Stanford University where she earned a Bachelor of Arts degree in Sociology and Communications and played on its women's basketball team.

In her senior year, she averaged 8.5 ppg and 4.5 rpg in 111 career games with the Cardinal and finished as Stanford's 23rd all-time leading scorer (944 points) and the 20th all-time leading rebounder (497). Her 110 blocked shots ranked 10th on the Pacific-10 Conference's all-time list. As a junior, Moos was named honorable mention All-Pac 10 after leading Stanford with 12.4 ppg and 5.5 rpg.

=== Career highs ===
Year	University	Games	Minutes
1997–98	Stanford University	21	128
Rebounds	Assists	Blocks	Steals
20	3	7	2

== WNBA ==
In 2001, Moos was drafted by the Phoenix Mercury, as the 53rd pick, in the fourth round. Moos played overseas professionally in France in the FIBA for the 2001–2002 season. In the 2002 WNBA season she played for the Miami Sol.

== International career ==
Moos has played basketball abroad representing the US in numerous countries including France, Austria, Slovakia, Mexico and Brazil. She played for the U.S. team and won a gold medal at the Junior Olympics in Brazil.

== Career statistics ==
Legend
GP	Games played	GS	Games started	MPG	Minutes per game	RPG	Rebounds per game
APG	Assists per game	SPG	Steals per game	BPG	Blocks per game	PPG	Points per game
TO	Turnovers per game	FG%	Field-goal percentage	3P%	3-point field-goal percentage	FT%	Free-throw percentage
**Bold**	Career best	°	League leader

=== WNBA ===
==== Regular season ====
WNBA regular season statistics
Year	Team	GP	GS	MPG	FG%	3P%	FT%	RPG	APG	SPG	BPG	TO	PPG
2001	Did not play (waived)												
2002	Miami	2	0	3.0	.000	—	—	0.0	0.0	0.0	0.5	0.0	0.0
**Career**	1 year, 1 team	2	0	3.0	.000	—	—	0.0	0.0	0.0	0.5	0.0	0.0

=== College ===
NCAA statistics
Year	Team	GP	GS	MPG	FG%	3P%	FT%	RPG	APG	SPG	BPG	TO	PPG
1997–98	Stanford	21	—	—	37.5	0.0	64.3	1.0	0.1	0.1	0.3	—	1.6
1998–99	Stanford	**30**	—	—	45.3	20.0	**73.6**	**6.7**	0.7	0.5	**1.5**	—	**12.9**
1999–00	Stanford	**30**	—	—	**46.2**	**40.5**	73.5	5.5	**0.8**	**0.8**	0.9	—	12.4
2000–01	Stanford	**30**	—	—	40.6	33.3	69.6	3.7	0.3	0.3	1.0	—	5.1
**Career**		111	—	—	44.4	32.2	72.6	4.5	0.5	0.4	1.0	—	8.5

== Achievements ==
- 1997 Nike/WBCA All-America
- 1997 Parade Magazine First Team All-America
- 2000 Honorable Mention All-Pac-10
- 1997 Gatorade Central Region Player of the Year
- 2000 Honorable Mention Pac-10 All-Academic
- 1997 Gatorade Minnesota Player of the Year
- 1998–99 All-Pac-10 Honorable Mention
- 1997 Sporting News Top Student Athletes in the Country
- 1997 Naismith National Player of the Year Finalist
- 1996 USA Basketball Junior National Team
- 1997 Parade Magazine First Team All-America
- 1996 Parade Magazine Fourth Team All-America
- 1997 USA Today First Team All-America
- 1996 Associated Press Minnesota Player of the Year
- 1997 Nike/WBCA All-America
- 1996 USA Today Minnesota Player of the Year
- 1997 USA Basketball Junior World Championship Team
- 1996 Gatorade Minnesota Player of the Year
- 1997 Blue Star Index No. 1 Post Player
- 1995, 1996, 1997 Street & Smith's Preseason All-America

== Personal life ==
Moos was engaged to fellow Stanford alumnus and NBA basketball player Jason Collins, with whom she had an eight-year relationship. The wedding was cancelled in the summer of 2009 by Collins. In 2013, Collins came out as gay in a personal essay published in Sports Illustrated. Moos was unaware of Collins' sexual orientation until a few days before he publicly came out. Carolyn Moos got married in May 2025 and gave birth to a daughter, Chaysa, in December 2025.
