= Milena Flores =

American basketball player (born 1977)

Personal information
- Born: October 10, 1977 (age 49)
- Listed height: 5 ft 6 in (1.68 m)
- Listed weight: 125 lb (57 kg)

Career information
- High school: Snohomish (Snohomish, Washington)
- College: Stanford (1996–2000)
- WNBA draft: 2000: 3rd round, 40th overall pick
- Drafted by: Miami Sol
- Playing career: 2000–2002
- Position: Point guard
- Number: 22
- Coaching career: 2002–2018

Career history

Playing
- 2000: Miami Sol
- 2001–2002: Lietuvos Telekomas

Coaching
- 2002–2004: Pacific (assistant)
- 2004–2005: Lehigh (assistant)
- 2005–2007: Yale (assistant)
- 2007–2018: Princeton (assistant)

Career highlights
- 2× First-team All-Pac-10 (1999, 2000); Pac-10 All-Freshman team (1997)
- Stats at Basketball Reference

Milena Flores (born October 10, 1977) is an American former professional basketball player and coach. She played college basketball for the Stanford Cardinal from 1996 to 2000 and was a two-time All-Pac-10 Conference first-team member. Flores was selected by the Miami Sol in the third round of the 2000 WNBA draft and played in the Women's National Basketball Association (WNBA) during the 2000 season. She also played in Lithuania. Flores became a coach after her retirement from playing and served as an assistant for the Pacific Tigers, Lehigh Mountain Hawks, Yale Bulldogs and Princeton Tigers.

== Early life ==
Flores was born to Silas and Carmen Flores. She has a younger brother and sister. Flores moved with her family from Los Angeles, California, to Snohomish, Washington, when she was young. Her second cousin, Mike Cordova, played for the Stanford Cardinal football team.

Flores first played basketball when she was aged six. She also participated in gymnastics, soccer, volleyball and track while she was growing up. She attended Cathcart Elementary School where one of her classmates was future baseball player Adam Eaton.

Flores played basketball at Snohomish High School. She averaged 12.6 points, 5.2 rebounds, 5.8 assists and 5.8 steals per game during her senior season in 1995–96. Flores led her team to a Western Conference AAA championship in 1996. She also played on the school's soccer team and earned all-conference honors. Flores was chosen alongside Eaton as "Most Likely to Be a Professional Athlete" by her classmates.

Flores was inducted into the Snohomish County Sports Hall of Fame in 2013.

== College career ==
Flores committed to play college basketball for the Stanford Cardinal. She had wanted to play for the Cardinal since she was a sixth-grader and idolized Jennifer Azzi.

Flores was named to the Pac-10 Conference all-freshman team while the Cardinal reached the Final Four of the 1997 NCAA tournament. She became the Cardinal's starting point guard as a sophomore. Flores was selected to the All-Pac-10 first-team in 1999 and 2000.

Flores led the Cardinal in assists (5.9), steals (1.9) and minutes (37.6) per game during her senior season. She finished her career ranked third on the program's all-time assists list.

== Professional playing career ==
Flores was selected in the third round of the 2000 WNBA draft by the Miami Sol. She averaged 3.5 points and 1.5 assists per game during her rookie season. Flores suffered a high right-ankle sprain and a medial collateral ligament sprain in her right knee during a practice session during the 2001 preseason and was placed on the injured reserve list by the Sol. On July 3, 2001, Flores was waived by the Sol.

Flores played for two years with Lietuvos Telekomas in Lithuania.

== Coaching career ==
On May 20, 2002, Flores was hired by the Pacific Tigers as an assistant coach. She joined the Lehigh Mountain Hawks as an assistant coach for the 2004–05 season. Flores was an assistant coach for the Yale Bulldogs from 2005 to 2007.

On June 15, 2007, Flores joined the Princeton Tigers as an assistant coach. She primarily worked with the team's guards during her first five seasons and then took over coaching the posts in 2012.

== Personal life ==
Flores is married to Sonia Raman, the head coach for the Seattle Storm.
