= 2001 WNBA playoffs =

Professional women's basketball tournament

- Dates: August 16 – September 1, 2001

Final positions
- Champions: Los Angeles Sparks
- Runners-up: Charlotte Sting

Tournament statistics
- Scoring leader(s): Lisa Leslie (Los Angeles) (22.3 PPG)

Awards
- MVP: Lisa Leslie (Los Angeles)

The 2001 WNBA playoffs was the postseason for the Women's National Basketball Association's 2001 season which ended with the Western Conference champion Los Angeles Sparks beating the Eastern Conference champion Charlotte Sting, 2–0. Lisa Leslie was named the MVP of the Finals.

== Regular season standings ==
Eastern Conference

Eastern Conference	W	L	PCT	Conf.	GB
Cleveland Rockers ^{x}	22	10	.688	15–6	–
New York Liberty ^{x}	21	11	.656	13–8	1.0
Miami Sol ^{x}	20	12	.625	14–7	2.0
Charlotte Sting ^{x}	18	14	.563	15–6	4.0
Orlando Miracle ^{o}	13	19	.406	9–12	9.0
Indiana Fever ^{o}	10	22	.313	7–14	12.0
Detroit Shock ^{o}	10	22	.313	7–14	12.0
Washington Mystics ^{o}	10	22	.313	4–17	12.0

Western Conference

Western Conference	W	L	PCT	Conf.	GB
Los Angeles Sparks ^{x}	28	4	.875	19–2	–
Sacramento Monarchs ^{x}	20	12	.625	13–8	8.0
Utah Starzz ^{x}	19	13	.594	11–10	9.0
Houston Comets ^{x}	19	13	.594	13–8	9.0
Phoenix Mercury ^{o}	13	19	.406	8–13	15.0
Minnesota Lynx ^{o}	12	20	.375	9–12	16.0
Portland Fire ^{o}	11	21	.344	5–16	17.0
Seattle Storm ^{o}	10	22	.313	6–15	18.0

Note: Teams with an "X" clinched playoff spots.

== Bracket ==
The top four teams from each conference qualified for the playoffs and were seeded based on their regular season standings.

**Conference semifinals** **Best-of-3**
E1	Cleveland	1
E4	**Charlotte**	**2**
**Eastern Conference**
E2	**New York**	**2**
E3	Miami	1
W1	**Los Angeles**	**2**
W4	Houston	0
**Western Conference**
W2	**Sacramento**	**2**
W3	Utah	0

**Conference finals** Best-of-3
E4	**Charlotte**	**2**
E2	New York	1
W1	**Los Angeles**	**2**
W2	Sacramento	1

**WNBA Finals**; Best-of-3
E4	Charlotte	0
W1	**Los Angeles**	**2**

- **Bold** – Series winner
- Italics – Team with home-court advantage

== Conference semifinals ==
=== Eastern Conference ===
Charlotte 2, Cleveland 1

- G1: CHA 53, CLE 46
- G2: CLE 69, CHA 51
- G3: CHA 72, CLE 64

New York 2, Miami 1

- G1: NYL 62, MIA 46
- G2: MIA 53, NYL 50
- G3: NYL 72, MIA 61

=== Western Conference ===
L.A. 2, Houston 0

- G1: LA 64, HOU 59
- G2: LA 70, HOU 58

Sacramento 2, Utah 0

- G1: SAC 89, UTA 65
- G2: SAC 71, UTA 66

== Conference finals ==
=== Eastern Conference ===
Charlotte 2, New York 1

- G1: NYL 61, CHA 57
- G2: CHA 62, NYL 53
- G3: CHA 48, NYL 44

=== Western Conference ===
L.A. 2, Sacramento 1

- G1: LA 74, SAC 73
- G2: SAC 80, LA 60
- G3: LA 93, SAC 62

== WNBA Championship ==
August 30

Recap

**Los Angeles Sparks** **75**, Charlotte Sting 66
Scoring by half: 35–39, 40–27
Pts: Lisa Leslie 24; Rebs: Milton, Leslie 8 each Asts: DeLisha Milton 5	Pts: Andrea Stinson 18; Rebs: Allison Feaster 5 Asts: Andrea Stinson 5
**Los Angeles leads series, 1–0**

Charlotte Coliseum, Charlotte, North Carolina
Attendance: 16,132
Referees: Melissa Barlow, Gary Zielinski, Michael Price

September 1

Recap

Charlotte Sting 54, **Los Angeles Sparks** **82**
Scoring by half: 30–38, 24–44
Pts: Tammy Sutton-Brown 12; Rebs: Charlotte Smith 8 Asts: Dawn Staley 5	Pts: Lisa Leslie 24; Rebs: Lisa Leslie 13; Asts: Tamecka Dixon 7
**Los Angeles wins series, 2–0**

Staples Center, Los Angeles, California
Attendance: 13,141
Referees: Patty Broderick, June Courteau, Bob Trammell

== See also ==
- List of WNBA Champions
