= Miami Sol =

- Conference: Eastern
- Leagues: WNBA
- Founded: 2000
- Dissolved: 2002
- History: Miami Sol; 2000–2002
- Arena: American Airlines Arena
- Location: Miami, Florida
- Team colors: Fiery red, yellow, black, orange, white
- Head coach: Ron Rothstein

The Miami Sol was a professional women's basketball team that was based in Miami and entered the Women's National Basketball Association (WNBA) in 2000. They played their games at American Airlines Arena as the sister team to the Miami Heat of the National Basketball Association (NBA). The team folded after the 2002 season because of financial problems.

== History ==
The city of Miami was granted one of the first four expansion teams of the WNBA in June 1999 along with Indianapolis, Seattle, and Portland. In their short history, the Miami Sol was coached for three seasons by Ron Rothstein. The league held an expansion draft for the four expansion teams on December 15, 1999. In their inaugural 2000 season, the Sol finished in sixth place in the Eastern Conference with an overall record of 13–19.

Players such as Debbie Black, Elena Baranova, Sandy Brondello, Ruth Riley, and Sheri Sam led them to a 20–12 record and a trip to the playoffs in 2001, but lost in the first round to the New York Liberty in three games, the only playoff appearance in franchise history. After losing to the New York Liberty in the playoffs, the Miami Sol finished the 2002 season with a 15–17 record.

That season proved to be the Sol's last. Citing the inability to raise enough funds to continue operation under the WNBA's new restructuring agreement, the organization ceased operations in November 2002. The team formally folded in January 2003 after the WNBA announced players from both the Sol and Portland Fire would be placed in a spring dispersal draft. The team finished with a .500 franchise record of 48 wins and 48 losses. The other Florida team, the Orlando Miracle, ceased operations after the 2002 season and was relocated to Connecticut as the Connecticut Sun, adopting a nickname and logo very similar to the Miami Sol.

After the team's folding, its players found success elsewhere in the league. After being reassigned to the Detroit Shock, Ruth Riley won two WNBA championships in 2003 and 2006. Betty Lennox and Sandy Brondello won a WNBA championship with the Seattle Storm in 2004, with Lennox winning the WNBA Finals Most Valuable Player award.

=== Uniforms ===
The Sol's road uniforms were fiery red, with the team name emblazoned in white on the chest and a WNBA ball in place of the hole in the letter "O". The home jerseys featured the same design, only with the colors inverted.

=== Name ===
The team's nickname, Sol, is Spanish and Portuguese for "sun" and was unveiled on January 7, 2000. The name played off the Miami area's large Hispanic population and its "brother" NBA team, the Miami Heat.

== Season-by-season records ==
Season	Team	Conference		Regular Season			Playoff Results
Season	Team	Conference		W	L	PCT	Playoff Results
Miami Sol
2000	2000	East	6th	13	19	.406	Did not qualify
2001	2001	East	3rd	20	12	.625	Lost Conference Semifinals (New York, 1–2)
2002	2002	East	6th	15	17	.469	Did not qualify
Regular Season				48	48	.500	0 Conference Championships
Playoffs				1	2	.333	0 WNBA Championships

== Notable players ==
- Marlies Askamp
- Elena Baranova
- Sandy Brondello
- Katrina Colleton
- Debbie Black
- Milena Flores
- Pollyanna Johns-Kimbrough
- Betty Lennox
- Carolyn Moos
- Vanessa Nygaard
- Kristen Rasmussen
- Ruth Riley
- Sheri Sam
- Iziane Castro Marques

== Coaches and others ==
Head coaches:

- Ron Rothstein (2000–02)

General Managers:

- Ron Rothstein (2000–02)

Assistant coaches

- Tony Fiorentino (2000–02)
- Jenny Boucek (2000–02)

TV Production

- Marc Brody (2000–02)
