= List of WNBA All-Stars =

The Women's National Basketball Association (WNBA) All-Star Game is an annual exhibition basketball game played between the Eastern Conference and the Western Conference All-Stars. Eleven players, five starters and six reserves, from each conference are chosen. The starters are chosen through electronic ballots cast daily by fans on WNBA.com. The leading vote recipients at each position start the game. The reserves are chosen by voting among the league's head coaches. Coaches are not allowed to vote for their own players. Through the 2013 game, coaches could select two guards, two forwards, one center and two players regardless of positions. Starting with the 2014 game, the forward and center positions were folded into a single frontcourt category; coaches can now vote for two guards, three frontcourt players, and one player regardless of position. If a player is unable to participate due to injury or illness, a replacement will be selected.

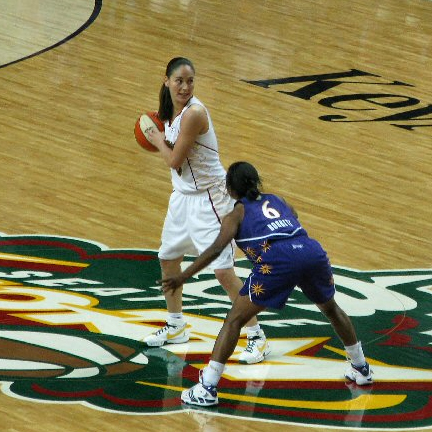
Sue Bird, on offense

In six seasons, there was no All-Star Game:

- In 2004, The Game at Radio City was held between the WNBA All-Stars and the USA national team due to the 2004 Summer Olympics.
- The 2008 All-Star Game was not held due to the 2008 Summer Olympics.
- In 2010, the Stars at the Sun game was also held between a team of WNBA stars and the USA national team, even though it was a non-Olympic year and the season did not directly conflict with the year's main international women's basketball event, the 2010 FIBA World Championship for Women.
- The 2012 All-Star Game was not held due to the 2012 Summer Olympics.
- The 2016 All-Star Game was not held due to the 2016 Summer Olympics.
- The 2020 All-Star Game was not held due to the COVID-19 pandemic.

Sue Bird holds the records for most All-Star Game selections (13), most All-Star Games played (12), and the most selections as a starter (9).

== List ==
!	Denotes player who has been inducted to the Naismith Memorial Basketball Hall of Fame
^	Denotes player who has been inducted to the Women's Basketball Hall of Fame
*	Denotes player who has been selected for at least one All-Star Game and All-WNBA Team

#	Denotes number of times the player has been selected to play in an All-Star Game
†	Denotes player selected as All-Star during player's rookie season
**Bold**	Denotes player who is still active as of the 2025 WNBA season

List accurate as of the 2025 WNBA All-Star Game + 2026 All-Star starters

Player	#	Selections	Notes	Ref.
Sue Bird † * ^ !	13	2002–2003, 2005–2007, 2009, 2011, 2014–2015, 2017–2018, 2021–2022	Missed 2007 game Replacement player in 2014 game	
Diana Taurasi *	11	2005–2007, 2009, 2011, 2013–2014, 2017–2018, 2021, 2024		
Tamika Catchings † * ^ !	10	2002–2003, 2005–2007, 2009, 2011, 2013–2015	Missed 2006 game	
**Brittney Griner** † *	10	2013–2015, 2017–2019, 2021–2024	Missed 2013, 2017, & 2022 games Honorary starter in 2022 game	
**Nneka Ogwumike** *	10	2013–2015, 2017–2019, 2022–2025	Missed 2018 game	
Tina Thompson * ^ !	9	1999–2003, 2006–2007, 2009, 2013	Missed 2003 & 2006 games Replacement player in 2013 game	
Lisa Leslie * ^ !	8	1999–2003, 2005–2006, 2009	Missed 2009 game	
Seimone Augustus † * ^ !	8	2006–2007, 2011, 2013–2015, 2017–2018	Missed 2014 & 2015 games	
Sylvia Fowles * ^ !	8	2009, 2011, 2013, 2017–2019, 2021–2022		
Tina Charles *	8	2011, 2013–2015, 2017–2019, 2021		
**Breanna Stewart** *	8	2017–2018, 2021–2026	Team captain in 2022 & 2023	
**A'ja Wilson** † *	8	2018–2019, 2021–2026	Team captain in 2019, 2022, & 2023; Missed 2019 game	
Yolanda Griffith † * ^ !	7	1999–2001, 2003, 2005–2007		
Nykesha Sales † *	7	1999–2003, 2005–2006	Replacement player in 2001 & 2003 games Missed 2006 game	
Katie Smith * ^ !	7	2000–2003, 2005–2006, 2009		
Lauren Jackson † * ^ !	7	2001–2003, 2005–2007, 2009		
Candice Dupree †	7	2006–2007, 2009, 2014–2015, 2017, 2019	Replacement player in 2006 game	
Cappie Pondexter † * ^	7	2006–2007, 2009, 2011, 2013–2015		
Candace Parker * ^ !	7	2011, 2013–2014, 2017–2018, 2021–2022	Team captain in 2018; Missed 2011 game	
Elena Delle Donne † * ^ !	7	2013–2015, 2017–2019, 2023	Team captain in 2018 & 2019; Missed 2013, 2014, 2017, & 2023 games	
**Skylar Diggins** *	7	2014–2015, 2017–2018, 2021–2022, 2025	Missed 2015 game	
Chamique Holdsclaw † * ^ !	6	1999–2003, 2005	Missed 2001 & 2002 game	
Taj McWilliams-Franklin † * ^	6	1999–2001, 2005–2007	Replacement player in 2006 game	
Sheryl Swoopes * ^ !	6	1999–2003, 2005–2006		
Becky Hammon * ^ !	6	2003, 2005–2007, 2009, 2011	Missed 2003 & 2006 games	
Maya Moore † * ^ !	6	2011, 2013–2015, 2017–2018		
**DeWanna Bonner** *	6	2015, 2018–2019, 2021, 2023–2024		
**Chelsea Gray** *	6	2017–2019, 2021, 2023–2024		
**Alyssa Thomas** *	6	2017, 2019, 2022–2025		
**Jewell Loyd** *	6	2018–2019, 2021–2024		
Teresa Weatherspoon * ^ !	5	1999–2003		
Dawn Staley ^ !	5	2001–2003, 2005–2006		
Katie Douglas *	5	2006–2007, 2009, 2011, 2014		
Lindsay Whalen * ^ !	5	2006, 2011, 2013–2015	Missed 2015 game	
Rebekkah Brunson	5	2007, 2011, 2013, 2017–2018	Missed 2007 game Replacement player in 2018 game	
Angel McCoughtry *	5	2011, 2013–2015, 2018		
**Courtney Vandersloot** † *	5	2011, 2019, 2021–2023		
**Kayla McBride**	5	2015, 2018–2019, 2024–2025	Replacement player in 2015 and 2025 games	
**Jonquel Jones** *	5	2017, 2019, 2021–2022, 2024		
**Napheesa Collier** † *	5	2019, 2021, 2023–2025	Replacement player in 2019 game Team captain in 2025	
Shannon Johnson † *	4	1999–2000, 2002–2003		
Ticha Penicheiro * ^	4	1999–2002		
Natalie Williams † * ^	4	1999–2001, 2003	Missed 2001 game	
Tari Phillips *	4	2000–2003		
Swin Cash * ^ !	4	2003, 2005, 2009, 2011		
Cheryl Ford † *	4	2003, 2005–2007		
Deanna Nolan *	4	2003, 2005–2007		
Alana Beard * ^	4	2005–2007, 2009		
Liz Cambage † *	4	2011, 2018–2019, 2021	Replacement player in 2011 game	
**Kahleah Copper** *	4	2021–2024		
**Arike Ogunbowale***	4	2021–2024		
**Brionna Jones**	4	2021–2022, 2024–2025	Replacement player in 2025 game	
**Sabrina Ionescu** *	4	2022–2025		
**Kelsey Plum** *	4	2022–2025		
**Jackie Young** *	4	2022–2025		
**Aliyah Boston** † *	4	2023–2026		
**Kelsey Mitchell** *	4	2023–2026		
Cynthia Cooper * ^ !	3	1999–2000, 2003	Missed 2000 & 2003 games	
Merlakia Jones *	3	1999–2001		
Nikki McCray ^	3	1999–2001		
Andrea Stinson *	3	2000–2002		
Tamecka Dixon *	3	2001–2003		
Marie Ferdinand	3	2002–2003, 2005	Replacement player in 2003 game	
Penny Taylor * ^	3	2002, 2007, 2011		
Sophia Young † *	3	2006–2007, 2009		
Érika de Souza	3	2009, 2013, 2014	Replacement player in 2013 game	
Danielle Robinson *	3	2013–2015		
Kristi Toliver *	3	2013, 2018–2019		
Allie Quigley	3	2017–2019		
**Natasha Howard** *	3	2019, 2022, 2026		
**Dearica Hamby**	3	2021–2022, 2024		
**Satou Sabally** *	3	2021, 2023, 2025	Missed 2025 game	
**Rhyne Howard** †	3	2022–2023, 2025	Replacement player in 2023 game Missed 2025 game	
**Allisha Gray** *	3	2023–2025		
**Caitlin Clark** † *	3	2024–2026	Team captain in 2025; Missed 2025 game	
Ruthie Bolton * ^	2	1999, 2001		
Vickie Johnson	2	1999, 2001	Replacement player in 1999 game	
Mwadi Mabika *	2	2000, 2002		
DeLisha Milton-Jones ^	2	2000, 2007		
Tammy Sutton-Brown	2	2002, 2007		
Margo Dydek	2	2003, 2006		
Michelle Snow	2	2005–2006	Replacement player in 2006 game	
Asjha Jones *	2	2007, 2009		
Crystal Langhorne *	2	2011, 2013		
Epiphanny Prince *	2	2011, 2013		
Glory Johnson	2	2013–2014		
Ivory Latta	2	2013–2014	Replacement player in 2014 game	
Chiney Ogwumike †	2	2014, 2018		
Shoni Schimmel †	2	2014–2015		
**Stefanie Dolson**	2	2015, 2017		
Emma Meesseman	2	2015, 2022		
**Ariel Atkins**	2	2021–2022		
**Courtney Williams**	2	2021, 2025		
**Angel Reese** †	2	2024–2025		
**Paige Bueckers** † *	2	2025–2026		
**Gabby Williams**	2	2025–2026		
Sandy Brondello	1	1999		
Vicky Bullett ^	1	1999		
Tonya Edwards †	1	1999		
Jennifer Gillom ^	1	1999		
Kym Hampton	1	1999		
Rebecca Lobo * ^ !	1	1999	Missed 1999 game	
Michele Timms ^ !	1	1999		
Betty Lennox † *	1	2000		
Wendy Palmer *	1	2000		
Brandy Reed	1	2000		
Sue Wicks ^	1	2000		
Janeth Arcain * ^	1	2001		
Elena Baranova	1	2001		
Chasity Melvin	1	2001	Missed 2001 game	
Jackie Stiles † ^	1	2001		
Rita Williams	1	2001	Replacement player in 2001 game	
Stacey Dales †	1	2002	Replacement player in 2002 game	
Adrienne Goodson	1	2002		
Sheri Sam	1	2002		
Nikki Teasley *	1	2003	Replacement player in 2003 game	
Adrian Williams-Strong	1	2003		
Ruth Riley ^	1	2005		
DeMya Walker	1	2005		
Ann Wauters	1	2005		
Tangela Smith	1	2006	Replacement player in 2006 game	
Tamika Whitmore	1	2006		
Kara Braxton	1	2007		
Anna DeForge	1	2007		
Kara Lawson	1	2007	Replacement player in 2007 game	
Nicky Anosike	1	2009		
Shameka Christon	1	2009		
Charde Houston	1	2009		
Sancho Lyttle	1	2009		
Jia Perkins	1	2009		
Nicole Powell	1	2009	Replacement player in 2009 game	
Danielle Adams †	1	2011		
Essence Carson	1	2011		
Renee Montgomery	1	2011		
Allison Hightower	1	2013		
Shavonte Zellous	1	2013		
Jessica Breland	1	2014		
Briann January	1	2014		
Alex Bentley	1	2015		
Kelsey Bone	1	2015		
Marissa Coleman	1	2015		
Jantel Lavender	1	2015	Replacement player in 2015 game	
Plenette Pierson	1	2015		
Riquna Williams	1	2015	Replacement player in 2015 game	
Layshia Clarendon	1	2017		
**Tiffany Hayes** *	1	2017		
Sugar Rodgers	1	2017		
Jasmine Thomas	1	2017		
**Elizabeth Williams**	1	2017		
Diamond DeShields *	1	2019		
**Kia Nurse**	1	2019		
**Odyssey Sims** *	1	2019		
**Erica Wheeler**	1	2019		
**Betnijah Laney-Hamilton**	1	2021		
**Ezi Magbegor**	1	2023		
Cheyenne Parker-Tyus	1	2023		
**Sonia Citron** †	1	2025		
**Kiki Iriafen** †	1	2025		
**Brittney Sykes**	1	2025	Replacement player in 2025 game	
**Kayla Thornton**	1	2025		
**Olivia Miles** †	1	2026		
**Jessica Shepard**	1	2026		
