= List of WNBA All-Star Game broadcasters =

The following is a list of the television networks and announcers that have broadcast the WNBA All-Star Game.

== 2020s ==
Year	Network	Play-by-play	Color commentator(s)	Sideline reporter(s)	Studio host	Studio analyst(s)
2026	ABC	Ryan Ruocco	Rebecca Lobo	Holly Rowe	Malika Andrews	Andraya Carter, Chiney Ogwumike and Monica McNutt
2025	ABC	Ryan Ruocco	Rebecca Lobo	Holly Rowe	Elle Duncan	Andraya Carter and Chiney Ogwumike
2024	ABC	Ryan Ruocco	Rebecca Lobo	Holly Rowe	LaChina Robinson	Andraya Carter, Carolyn Peck and Chiney Ogwumike
2023	ABC	Ryan Ruocco	Rebecca Lobo	Holly Rowe	LaChina Robinson	Andraya Carter, Carolyn Peck and Ros Gold-Onwude
2022	ABC	Ryan Ruocco	Rebecca Lobo	Holly Rowe	LaChina Robinson	Carolyn Peck
2021	ESPN	Ryan Ruocco	Rebecca Lobo	Holly Rowe		

== 2010s ==
Year	Network	Play-by-play	Color commentator(s)	Sideline reporter(s)	Studio host	Studio analyst(s)
2019	ABC	Ryan Ruocco	Rebecca Lobo	Holly Rowe and LaChina Robinson		
2018	ABC	Ryan Ruocco	Rebecca Lobo	Holly Rowe and LaChina Robinson		
2017	ABC	Ryan Ruocco	Rebecca Lobo	Holly Rowe and LaChina Robinson		
2015	ABC	Ryan Ruocco	Rebecca Lobo	Holly Rowe	Matt Barrie	Chiney Ogwumike
2014	ESPN	Ryan Ruocco	Rebecca Lobo	Holly Rowe	Doug Kezerian	
2013	ABC	Ryan Ruocco	Rebecca Lobo	Holly Rowe		
2011	ABC	Dave Pasch	Carolyn Peck	Heather Cox		
2010	ESPN	Terry Gannon	Carolyn Peck	Heather Cox and Rebecca Lobo		

=== Notes ===
- No official All-Star Game was held in 2010. Instead, there was an exhibition game matching the USA national team against a WNBA All-Star team, with Team USA winning 99–72 at Mohegan Sun Arena. And as previously mentioned, no games were held at all in 2012 and 2016 due to the Summer Olympic games.

== 2000s ==
Year	Network	Play-by-play	Color commentator(s)	Sideline reporter(s)	Studio host	Studio analyst(s)
2009	ABC	Dave Pasch	Nancy Lieberman and Carolyn Peck	Heather Cox and Rebecca Lobo		
2007	ABC	Dave Pasch	Doris Burke	Heather Cox and Rebecca Lobo	Linda Cohn	Nancy Lieberman
2006	ESPN	Dave Pasch	Doris Burke	Heather Cox	Linda Cohn	
2005	ABC	Terry Gannon	Doris Burke	Rebecca Lobo	Pam Ward	
2004	ESPN	Terry Gannon	Ann Meyers and Greg Anthony	Doris Burke	Pam Ward	
2003	ABC	Mark Jones	Ann Meyers	Doris Burke and Lea B. Olsen	Pam Ward	Nancy Lieberman and Bill Laimbeer
2002	ESPN	Michele Tafoya	Doris Burke	Lea B. Olsen and Vera Jones		
2001	ESPN	John Saunders	Nancy Lieberman	Fran Harris and Lea B. Olsen	Robin Roberts	Sheryl Swoopes and Vera Jones
2000	ESPN	Robin Roberts	Jay Bilas			

=== Notes ===
- In June 2007, the WNBA signed a contract extension with ESPN. The new television deal runs from 2009 to 2016. A minimum of 18 games will be broadcast on ABC, ESPN, and ESPN2 each season; the rights to broadcast the first regular-season game and the All-Star Game are held by ABC. Additionally, a minimum of 11 postseason games will be broadcast on any of the three stations. Along with this deal, came the first-ever rights fees to be paid to a women's professional sports league. Over the eight years of the contract, "millions and millions of dollars" will be "dispersed to the league's teams".
- In 2004, the game was not played in its usual format due to the WNBA players competing in the 2004 Summer Olympics in Athens, Greece. That year, the USA national team defeated a team of WNBA All-Stars 74–58 at Radio City Music Hall. This game is officially considered to be an exhibition rather than an All-Star Game. The league also took a month-long break to accommodate players and coaches who would be participating in the summer games. The tradition of not playing the WNBA All-Star Game during an Olympic year has continued in 2008, 2012, and 2016 (along with the tradition of taking a month-long break during the regular season.)

== 1999 ==
Year	Network	Play-by-play	Color commentator(s)	Sideline reporter(s)	Studio host	Studio analyst(s)
1999	ESPN	Robin Roberts	Pat Summitt	Jay Bilas and Tiffany Wright	John Saunders	Nancy Lieberman

== See also ==
- List of WNBA Finals broadcasters
- List of current Women's National Basketball Association broadcasters
- List of NBA All-Star Game broadcasters
