= List of Texas Tech Lady Raiders in the WNBA draft =

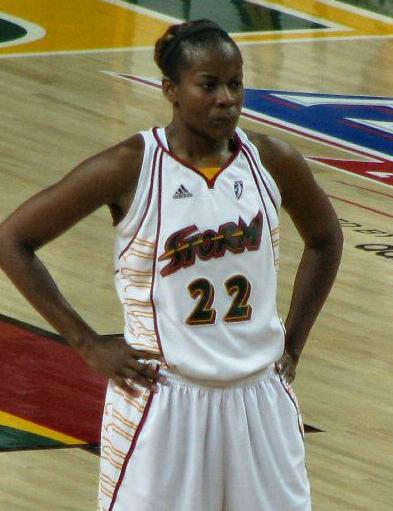
Sheryl Swoopes, Texas Tech's first player drafted into the WNBA

The Texas Tech Lady Raiders basketball team, representing Texas Tech University, has had 9 players drafted into the Women's National Basketball Association (WNBA) since the league began holding drafts in 1997. Sheryl Swoopes was Texas Tech's first player drafted in the WNBA, selected in the 1997 initial player allocation. The Charlotte Sting had drafted three Lady Raiders, more than any other WNBA franchise: Michi Atkins, in the WNBA elite draft, and Angie Braziel and Jia Perkins during the college draft.

== Key ==
General
^{†}	Selected to an all-star game
^{‡}	Won a league championship
^{♦}	Selected to an all-star game and won a league championship

Positions
C	Center
F	Forward
G	Guard

== Drafts ==
=== Initial player allocation ===
Pick	Player	Position	WNBA team (Note: This is the team that drafted the player, not their most recent team.)	Notes
5	Sheryl Swoopes^{♦}	C	Houston Comets	WNBA All-Star (1999, 2000, 2002, 2003, 2004, 2005, 2006); WNBA champion (1997, 1998, 1999, 2000)

=== Elite draft ===
Year	Round	Pick	Overall	Player	Position	WNBA team	Notes
1997	2	3	11	Michi Atkins	F	Charlotte Sting	—

=== College draft ===
Year	Round	Pick	Overall	Player	Position	WNBA team	Notes
1998	1	9	9	Alicia Thompson^{‡}	F	New York Liberty	WNBA champion (2004)
1999	4	9	45	Angie Braziel	F	Charlotte Sting	—
2000	2	8	28	Keitha Dickerson	F	Minnesota Lynx	—
2003	1	2	4	Plenette Pierson^{‡}	F	Phoenix Mercury	WNBA Champion (2006, 2008)
2004	3	9	35	Jia Perkins^{†}	G	Charlotte Sting	WNBA All-Star (2009)
2005	3	9	35	Cisti Greenwalt	C	Sacramento Monarchs	—
2006	3	11	39	Erin Grant	G	Seattle Storm	—
2020	2	5	17	Brittany Brewer	C	Atlanta Dream	
