= List of Oklahoma Sooners in the NBA and WNBA drafts =

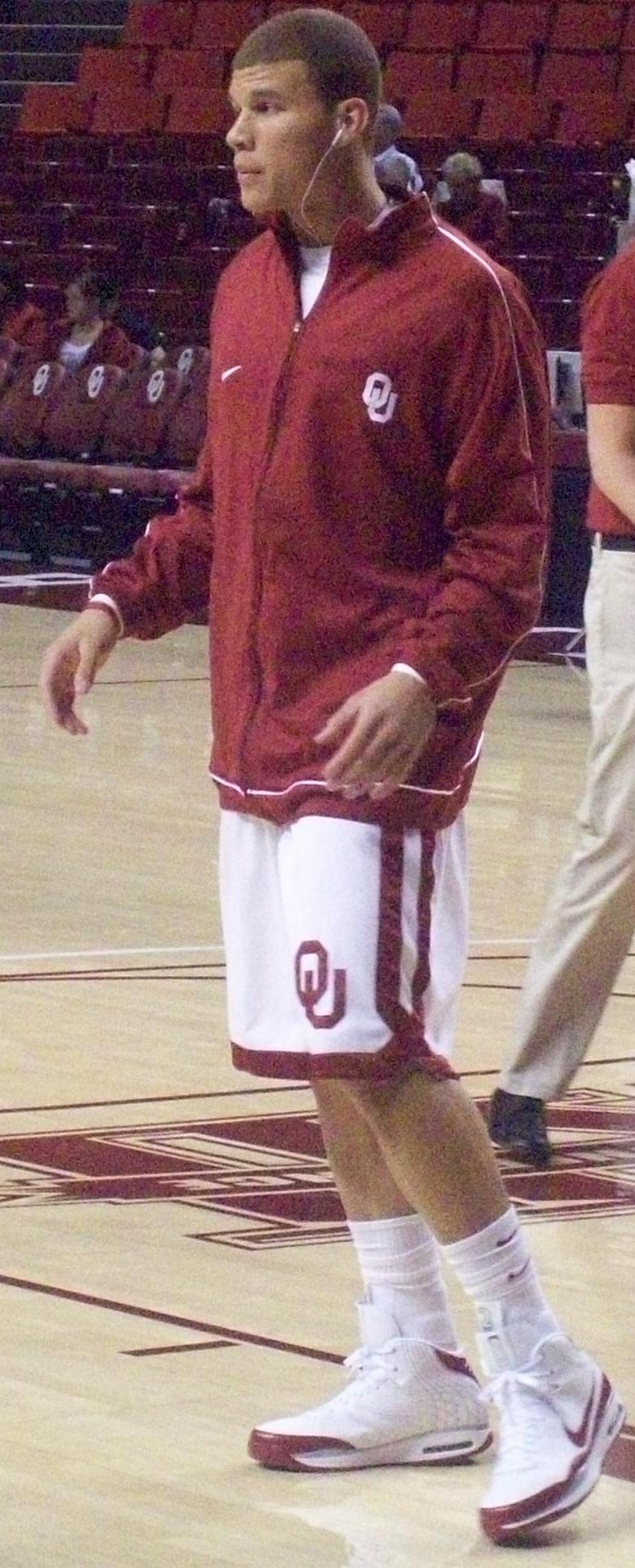
Blake Griffin, drafted in 2009, is Oklahoma's only number one overall pick.

The University of Oklahoma men's basketball team has had 46 players drafted in the National Basketball Association (NBA) while the women's basketball team has had 14 players selected in the Women's National Basketball Association (WNBA). This includes ten players taken in the first round of the NBA Draft and six players in the first round of the WNBA Draft. In 2009, Blake Griffin became the only Oklahoma basketball player to have been selected as the overall number one pick when he was drafted by the Los Angeles Clippers. In the 2010s, nine Oklahoma players have been selected in their respective drafts. Five have been women: three in 2010, one in 2011, and one in 2013. The four men's players drafted in the decade have been Romero Osby in 2013, Buddy Hield and Isaiah Cousins in 2016, and Trae Young in 2018.

Each NBA and WNBA franchise seeks to add new players through their respective annual draft. The NBA uses a draft lottery to determine the first three picks of the NBA draft; the 14 teams that did not make the playoffs the previous year are eligible to participate. After the first three picks are decided, the rest of the teams pick in reverse order of their win–loss record. To be eligible for the NBA draft, a player in the United States must be at least 19 years old during the calendar year of the draft and must be at least one year removed from the graduation of his high school class. From 1967 until the ABA–NBA merger in 1976, the American Basketball Association (ABA) held its own draft. The WNBA Draft is similar to the NBA with a couple of exceptions. Only four WNBA teams are eligible for the draft lottery, compared to the 14 eligible teams in the NBA. Also, all non-playoff teams that participate in the draft lottery select their picks in the order of the lottery outcome; the remainder of the league selects in reverse order of their win–loss record. The WNBA requires that players be at least 22 years old during the calendar year of the applicable seasons, have either graduated from a four-year university or have completed their intercollegiate basketball eligibility, or have played at least two seasons for another professional basketball league.

Four former Sooner men have been selected to participate in an NBA All-Star Game: Alvan Adams, Mookie Blaylock, Blake Griffin, and Trae Young. Two women, Stacey Dales and Danielle Robinson, have been selected to participate in a WNBA All-Star Game. Three former Sooner men have won championships with their respective teams.

== Key ==
| F | Forward | C | Center | G | Guard |
| # | Active in the NBA as of the 2022–23 season, or the WNBA as of the 2022 season | | | | |
| * | Selected to an NBA/WNBA All-Star Game | | | | |
| † | Won an ABA/NBA/WNBA championship | | | | |

== Player selection ==
=== NBA draft ===
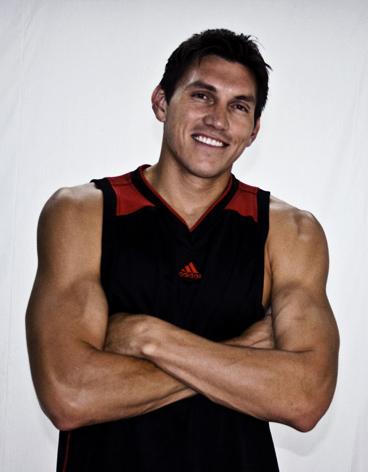
Eduardo Nájera, drafted in 2000

| Year | Round | Pick | Overall | Player | Position | NBA team (Note: This is the team that drafted the player, not their most recent team.) | Notes |
|---|---|---|---|---|---|---|---|
| 1949 | 8 | — | — | Paul Courty | F | Providence Steamrollers | — |
| 1950 | 6 | — | — | Wayne Glasgow | F | Minneapolis Lakers | — |
| 1950 | 10 | — | — | Paul Merchant | F | Syracuse Nationals | — |
| 1951 | 1 | 3 | 3 | Marcus Freiberger | C | Indianapolis Olympians | — |
| 1954 | 11 | 7 | 106 | Bob Waller | F | New York Knicks | — |
| 1958 | 6 | 4 | 44 | Joe King | F/C | New York Knicks | — |
| 1962 | 8 | 2 | 62 | Warren Fouts | F | New York Knicks | — |
| 1968 | 3 | 7 | 29 | Don Sidle† | C | San Francisco Warriors | ABA Champion (1972) |
| 1968 | 8 | 2 | 71 | Willie Rogers | F | Seattle SuperSonics | — |
| 1970 | 1 | 6 | 3 | Garfield Heard | F | Seattle SuperSonics | — |
| 1971 | 3 | 5 | 33 | Clifford Ray† | F | Chicago Bulls | NBA Champion (1975) |
| 1972 | 8 | — (Note: Bobby Jack is listed as the 90th overall pick in the 8th round Oklahoma basketball media guide. A specific number for the round is not provided.) | 90 | Bobby Jack | F | Cincinnati Royals | — |
| 1972 | 14 | 7 | 110 | Andrew Pettes | G | Chicago Bulls | — |
| 1974 | 8 | 4 | 130 | Tom Holland | F | Phoenix Suns | — |
| 1974 | 9 | 4 | 148 | Ted Evans | C | Phoenix Suns | — |
| 1975 | 1 | 4 | 4 | Alvan Adams* | C | Phoenix Suns | All-Star (1976); NBA Rookie of the Year Award (1976) |
| 1979 | 4 | 19 | 85 | John McCullough | G | Kansas City Kings | — |
| 1980 | 2 | 15 | 38 | Terry Stotts | F | Houston Rockets | — |
| 1980 | 3 | 17 | 63 | Al Beal | F | Milwaukee Bucks | — |
| 1980 | 5 | 6 | 98 | Aaron Curry | G | New Jersey Nets | — |
| 1983 | 3 | 14 | 61 | David Little | F | Denver Nuggets | — |
| 1983 | 5 | 1 | 94 | Chucky Barnett | G | Houston Rockets | — |
| 1983 | 5 | 11 | 104 | Charles Jones | C | Atlanta Hawks | — |
| 1983 | 10 | 18 | 224 | Bo Overton | G | Phoenix Suns | — |
| 1984 | 9 | 2 | 186 | Calvin Pierce | F | Chicago Bulls | — |
| 1985 | 1 | 2 | 2 | Wayman Tisdale | C | Indiana Pacers | — |
| 1986 | 3 | 19 | 66 | Anthony Bowie | G | Houston Rockets | — |
| 1987 | 3 | 1 | 47 | Tim McCalister | G | Los Angeles Clippers | — |
| 1987 | 4 | 20 | 89 | David Johnson | F | Dallas Mavericks | — |
| 1987 | 4 | 22 | 91 | Darryl Kennedy | F | Boston Celtics | — |
| 1988 | 1 | 12 | 12 | Harvey Grant | G | Washington Wizards | — |
| 1988 | 3 | 17 | 67 | Ricky Grace | G | Utah Jazz | — |
| 1989 | 1 | 6 | 6 | Stacey King† | C | Chicago Bulls | NBA Champion (1991, 1992, 1993) |
| 1989 | 1 | 12 | 12 | Mookie Blaylock* | G | New Jersey Nets | All-Star (1994) |
| 1992 | 2 | 5 | 32 | Brent Price | G | Washington Wizards | — |
| 1994 | 2 | 13 | 40 | Jeff Webster | F | Miami Heat | — |
| 1996 | 2 | 3 | 32 | Ryan Minor | F | Philadelphia 76ers | — |
| 1997 | 2 | 28 | 57 | Nate Erdmann | G | Utah Jazz | — |
| 2000 | 2 | 9 | 39 | Eduardo Nájera | F | Houston Rockets | — |
| 2009 | 1 | 1 | 1 | Blake Griffin^{#}* | F | Los Angeles Clippers | All-Star (2011, 2012, 2013, 2014, 2015, 2019); All-NBA Second Team (2012, 2013, 2014); NBA Rookie of the Year Award (2011) |
| 2009 | 2 | 18 | 46 | Taylor Griffin | F | Phoenix Suns | — |
| 2013 | 2 | 21 | 51 | Romero Osby | F | Orlando Magic | — |
| 2016 | 1 | 6 | 6 | Buddy Hield^{#} | G | New Orleans Pelicans | — |
| 2016 | 2 | 29 | 59 | Isaiah Cousins | G | Sacramento Kings | — |
| 2018 | 1 | 5 | 5 | Trae Young^{#}* | G | Dallas Mavericks | All-Star (2020, 2022); All-NBA Third Team (2023) |

Jeremiah Fears, 1st Round, 6th overall pick 2025 New Orleans Pelicans

=== WNBA draft ===
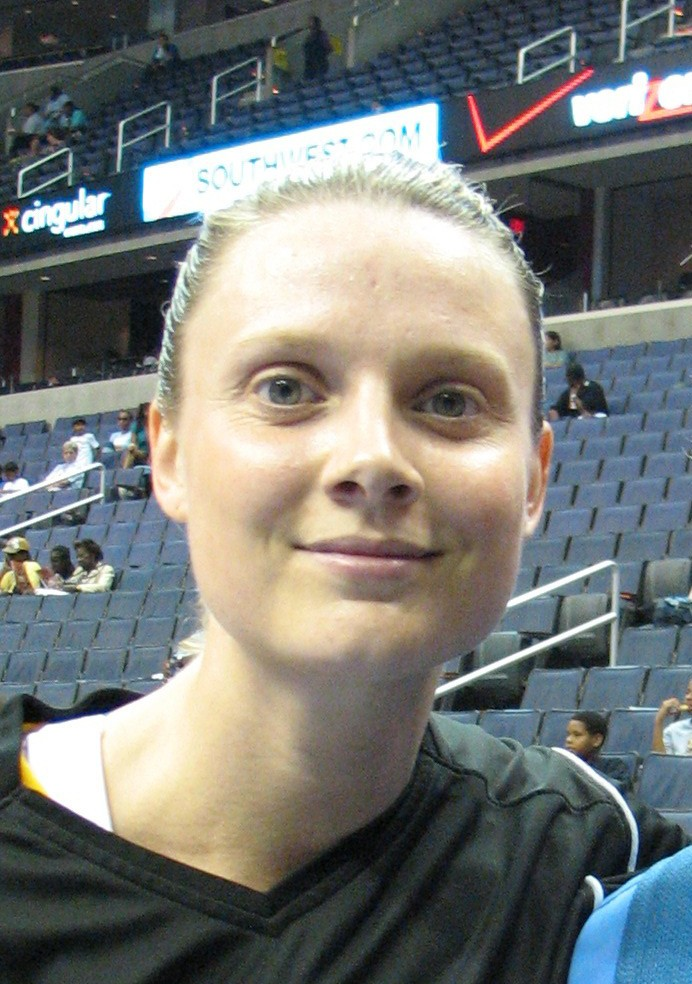
Stacey Dales, drafted in 2002, is Oklahoma's highest drafted woman player.

| Year | Rnd | Pick | Overall | Player name | Position | WNBA team | Notes |
|---|---|---|---|---|---|---|---|
| 2000 | 3 | 6 | 38 | Phylesha Whaley | F | Minnesota Lynx | — |
| 2002 | 1 | 3 | 3 | Stacey Dales* | G/F | Washington Mystics | All-Star (2002) |
| 2002 | 1 | 14 | 14 | LaNeishea Caufield | G | Utah Starzz | — |
| 2002 | 1 | 16 | 16 | Rosalind Ross | G | Los Angeles Sparks | — |
| 2004 | 3 | 1 | 27 | Maria Villaroel | G | Phoenix Mercury | — |
| 2005 | 1 | 13 | 13 | Dionnah Jackson | F | Detroit Shock | — |
| 2007 | 3 | 2 | 28 | Leah Rush | F | Phoenix Mercury | — |
| 2009 | 1 | 7 | 7 | Courtney Paris† | C | Sacramento Monarchs | WNBA Champion (2018) |
| 2009 | 2 | 9 | 22 | Ashley Paris | F | Los Angeles Sparks | — |
| 2010 | 2 | 7 | 19 | Amanda Thompson | F | Tulsa Shock | — |
| 2010 | 3 | 4 | 28 | Abi Olajuwon | C | Chicago Sky | — |
| 2010 | 3 | 12 | 36 | Nyeshia Stevenson | G/F | Phoenix Mercury | — |
| 2011 | 1 | 6 | 6 | Danielle Robinson*^{#} | G | San Antonio Silver Stars | All-Star (2013, 2014, 2015) |
| 2013 | 3 | 8 | 32 | Whitney Hand | G | San Antonio Silver Stars | — |
