= 2022 WNBA All-Star Game =

Exhibition basketball game

	1	2	3	4	Total
Team Stewart	28	11	28	35	112
Team Wilson	23	36	33	42	134
- Date: July 10, 2022
- Arena: Wintrust Arena
- City: Chicago, Illinois
- MVP: Kelsey Plum
- Attendance: 9,572
- Network: United States: ABC; Canada: TSN3/SN1
- Announcers: Ryan Ruocco, Rebecca Lobo, Holly Rowe, LaChina Robinson, Carolyn Peck

WNBA All-Star Game
< 2021	2023 >

The 2022 WNBA All-Star Game was an exhibition basketball game that was played on July 10, 2022, at Wintrust Arena. The Chicago Sky hosted the game and related events for the first time.

The league also debuted a new, two-day fan event called "WNBA Live," which included interactive events as well as the All-Star teams' practice. This year also brought back the Three-Point Contest and Skills Competition, for the first time since 2019.

A'ja Wilson, of the Las Vegas Aces was the overall leader in fan votes with 88,407, with Breanna Stewart, of the Seattle Storm, finishing in 2nd with 79,520 votes.

Allie Quigley won the MTN Dew 3-Point Shootout for a WNBA and NBA record 4th time. Sabrina Ionescu and her high school partner and NC State commit, Zoe Brooks, won the Skills Challenge.

Team Wilson defeated Team Stewart 132–112. Kelsey Plum of the Las Vegas Aces scored 30 points to tie Maya Moore for the All-Star Game record for points. She was named the MVP of the game. This was A'ja Wilson's second time winning as team captain – moving herself to 2–0.

== Rosters ==
=== Selection ===
On June 2, the WNBA announced that 2022 would similar roster selection process to the 2019 WNBA All-Star Game. Fans, WNBA players, head coaches, sports writers, and broadcasters would all be able to vote for All Stars. All groups could fill out a ballot of four guards and six front court players. Players and coaches could not vote for members of their own team. Voting began on June 3 at 2 p.m. ET and concluded on Monday, June 20 at 11:59 p.m. ET.

The voting was weighted as follows:

Voting group	Vote weight
Fans	50%
WNBA players	25%
Sports media	25%

Players were not allowed to vote for their own teammates. The top 10 players receiving votes based on this weighting would be selected to the All-Star Game. These ten players would be deemed the starters. The starters were revealed on June 22, 2022. After the announcement of the starters, the WNBA's head coaches selected the 12 reserves. Coaches voted for three guards, five frontcourt players, and four players at either position regardless of conference. They could not vote for their own players. The reserves were announced on June 28, 2022. The top two vote-getters were captains of the two All-Star teams and selected their teams from the pool of 8 remaining starters and the 12 reserves. The captains drafted their respective rosters by selecting first from the remaining eight players in the pool of starters and then from the pool of 12 reserves. ESPN broadcast the WNBA All-Star Team Selection Special on July 2, 2022.

==== Fan Vote Results ====
The following is the top 20 players based on fan voting alone.

Rank	Player	Number of Votes
1	A'ja Wilson	88,407
2	Breanna Stewart	79,520
3	Kelsey Plum	68,678
4	Candace Parker	66,462
5	Elena Delle Donne	45,876
6	Sylvia Fowles	42,828
7	Jackie Young	41,951
8	Nneka Ogwumike	41,177
9	Sue Bird	38,791
10	Skylar Diggins-Smith	34,561
11	Jewell Loyd	33,307
12	Dearica Hamby	32,862
13	Sabrina Ionescu	31,546
14	Diana Taurasi	30,667
15	Jonquel Jones	30,489
16	Courtney Vandersloot	27,780
17	Rhyne Howard	27,438
18	Kahleah Copper	26,037
19	Tina Charles	23,898
20	Arike Ogunbowale	23,440

==== Full Voting Results ====
The following are the overall scores for the Top 10 finishers – based on the results from all three voting groups. The fans votes was weighed at 50%, while votes from the media and players were weighed 25%. The players are sorted by their positions. The top four players at the guards and the top 6 players at the frontcourt positions were deemed the starters for the game.

Guards
Position	Player	Team	Fan Rank	Media Rank	Player Rank	Weighted Score
1	Kelsey Plum	Las Vegas Aces	1	1	1	1.0
2	Jackie Young	Las Vegas Aces	2	2	2	2.0
3	Sabrina Ionescu	New York Liberty	6	4	5	5.25
4	Sue Bird	Seattle Storm	3	9	7	5.50
5	Jewell Loyd	Seattle Storm	5	10	3	5.75
6	Skylar Diggins-Smith	Phoenix Mercury	4	3	14	6.25
7	Arike Ogunbowale	Dallas Wings	11	4	4	7.50
8	Courtney Vandersloot	Chicago Sky	8	8	8	8.0
9	Rhyne Howard	Atlanta Dream	9	6	9	8.25
10	Kelsey Mitchell	Indiana Fever	13	6	6	9.50

Frontcourt
Position	Player	Team	Fan Rank	Media Rank	Player Rank	Weighted Score
1	A'ja Wilson	Las Vegas Aces	1	2	1	1.25
2	Breanna Stewart	Seattle Storm	2	1	2	1.75
3	Sylvia Fowles	Minnesota Lynx	5	5	4	4.75
4	Nneka Ogwumike	Los Angeles Sparks	6	4	5	5.25
5	Jonquel Jones	Connecticut Sun	8	3	3	5.50
6	Candace Parker	Chicago Sky	3	7	13	6.50
7	Dearica Hamby	Las Vegas Aces	7	9	7	7.50
8	Elena Delle Donne	Washington Mystics	4	12	20	10.00
9	Tina Charles	Phoenix Mercury	9	11	11	10.00
10	Emma Meesseman	Chicago Sky	11	9	9	10.00

=== Head coaches ===
The head coaches for the AT&T WNBA All-Star 2022 were the head coaches of the two teams regardless of conference with the best records following games on Friday, June 24. The head coach with the best record as of that date coached the team whose captain earned the most fan votes.

Becky Hammon, coach of the Las Vegas Aces, and James Wade, coach of the Chicago Sky, qualified to be the two head coaches for the 2022 All-Star Game on June 24, 2022. They earned the right to be the coaches as they guided their teams to the top two spots in the standings as of that date. This is Hammon and Wade's first time as head coaches in the All-Star game. Wade had previous been an assistant coach for the Western Conference Team in the 2017 game.

=== All-Star Pool ===
The players for the All-Star Game were selected by the voting process described above. The starters for the game were announced on June 22, 2022, with A'ja Wilson of the Las Vegas Aces and Breanna Stewart of the Seattle Storm leading in fan votes. Those two were named captains for the game, along with Sue Bird of the Seattle Storm and Sylvia Fowles of the Minnesota Lynx who were named additional captains. This was Wilson and Stewarts fourth time being named to the All-Star team, while Fowles was named for the eighth time and Bird was named for the thirteenth time.

Candace Parker of the Chicago Sky and Nneka Ogwumike of the Los Angeles Sparks were named to the starting frontcourt, both earning their seventh all-star appearance. Jonquel Jones of the Connecticut Sun rounded out the frontcourt, earning her fourth all-star selection. In the backcourt, Sabrina Ionescu of the New York Liberty, Kelsey Plum and Jackie Young of the Las Vegas Aces were named to the starting lineup, each earning their first all-star selection. Brittney Griner was named an honorary All-Star and starter.

The All-Star Game reserves were announced on June 28, 2022. The reserves at the guard position included Courtney Vandersloot of the Chicago Sky, her fourth selection; Kahleah Copper of the Chicago Sky, her second selection; Ariel Atkins of the Washington Mystics, her second selection; Skylar Diggins-Smith, her sixth selection; Arike Ogunbowale of the Dallas Wings, her second selection; Jewell Loyd of the Seattle Storm, her fourth selection; and Rhyne Howard of the Atlanta Dream; her first selection.

The reserves at the frontcourt position included Dearica Hamby of the Las Vegas Aces, her second selection; Natasha Howard, her second selection; Brionna Jones of the Connecticut Sun, her second selection; Emma Meesseman of the Chicago Sky, her second selection; and Alyssa Thomas of the Connecticut Sun, her third selection.

Eastern Conference All-Stars
Pos	Player	Team	No. of selections
Starters
G	Sabrina Ionescu	New York Liberty	1
F	Jonquel Jones	Connecticut Sun	4
F	Candace Parker	Chicago Sky	7
Reserves
G	Ariel Atkins	Washington Mystics	2
G/F	Kahleah Copper	Chicago Sky	2
G	Rhyne Howard	Atlanta Dream	1
G	Courtney Vandersloot	Chicago Sky	4
F	Natasha Howard	New York Liberty	2
F	Brionna Jones	Connecticut Sun	2
F	Emma Meesseman	Chicago Sky	2
F	Alyssa Thomas	Connecticut Sun	3

Western Conference All-Stars
Pos	Player	Team	No. of selections
Players
G	Sue Bird	Seattle Storm	13
G	Kelsey Plum	Las Vegas Aces	1
G	Jackie Young	Las Vegas Aces	1
F	Breanna Stewart	Seattle Storm	4
F	Nneka Ogwumike	Los Angeles Sparks	7
F	A'ja Wilson	Las Vegas Aces	4
C	Sylvia Fowles	Minnesota Lynx	8
C	Brittney Griner^{HON}	Phoenix Mercury	8
Reserves
G	Skylar Diggins-Smith	Phoenix Mercury	6
G	Jewell Loyd	Seattle Storm	4
G	Arike Ogunbowale	Dallas Wings	2
F	Dearica Hamby	Las Vegas Aces	2

^HON Griner named an Honorary All-Star Starter

=== All-Star Selections per team ===
Number of All-Star players per team
Team	Number of players
Atlanta Dream	1
Chicago Sky	4
Connecticut Sun	3
Indiana Fever	0
New York Liberty	2
Washington Mystics	1
Dallas Wings	1
Las Vegas Aces	4
Los Angeles Sparks	1
Minnesota Lynx	1
Phoenix Mercury	2
Seattle Storm	3

=== Draft ===
The WNBA-All Star draft took place on July 2, 2022. A'ja Wilson and Breanna Stewart were named captain respectively as they received the most fan votes. Sue Bird and Sylvia Fowles were named honorary All-Star captains. Bird was assigned to Team Wilson, while Fowles to Team Stewart. The first six players to be drafted were starters. The next 12 players, chosen by WNBA head coaches were then drafted. Wilson began the draft of the starters due to her having the most votes, while Stewart began the draft of the reserves.

2022 All-Star Draft
Pick	Player	Team
1	Candace Parker	Wilson
2	Jackie Young	Stewart
3	Kelsey Plum	Wilson
4	Jonquel Jones	Stewart
5	Nneka Ogwumike	Wilson
6	Sabrina Ionescu	Stewart
7	Jewell Loyd	Stewart
8	Rhyne Howard	Wilson
9	Kahleah Copper	Stewart
10	Dearica Hamby	Wilson
11	Skylar Diggins-Smith	Stewart
12	Courtney Vandersloot	Wilson
13	Alyssa Thomas	Stewart
14	Ariel Atkins	Wilson
15	Arike Ogunbowale	Stewart
16	Brionna Jones	Wilson
17	Emma Meesseman	Stewart
18	Natasha Howard	Wilson

- Following the Draft, Team Wilson traded Nneka Ogwumike to Team Stewart for Sabrina Ionescu. Team Stewart traded Sylvia Fowles to Team Wilson for Sue Bird.

=== Final rosters ===
Team Wilson
Pos	Player	Team	No. of selections
Starters
G	Kelsey Plum	Las Vegas Aces	1
G	Sabrina Ionescu	New York Liberty	1
F	Candace Parker	Chicago Sky	7
F	A'ja Wilson	Las Vegas Aces	4
C	Sylvia Fowles	Minnesota Lynx	8
Reserves
G	Ariel Atkins	Washington Mystics	2
G	Rhyne Howard	Atlanta Dream	1
G	Courtney Vandersloot	Chicago Sky	4
F	Dearica Hamby	Las Vegas Aces	2
F	Natasha Howard	New York Liberty	2
F	Brionna Jones	Connecticut Sun	2
Head coach: Becky Hammon (Las Vegas Aces)

Team Stewart
Pos	Player	Team	No. of selections
Starters
G	Sue Bird	Seattle Storm	13
G	Jackie Young	Las Vegas Aces	1
F	Breanna Stewart	Seattle Storm	4
F	Jonquel Jones	Connecticut Sun	4
F	Nneka Ogwumike	Los Angeles Sparks	7
Reserves
G/F	Kahleah Copper	Chicago Sky	2
G	Skylar Diggins-Smith	Phoenix Mercury	6
G	Jewell Loyd	Seattle Storm	4
G	Arike Ogunbowale	Dallas Wings	2
F	Emma Meesseman	Chicago Sky	2
F	Alyssa Thomas	Connecticut Sun	3
Head coach: James Wade (Chicago Sky)

== Game ==
ABC, TSN3/SN1

July 10, 2022
1:00 p.m. ET

Report

Team Wilson 134, Team Stewart 112
Scoring by quarter: 23–28, 36–11, 33–38, 42–35
Pts: Kelsey Plum (30); Rebs: Sylvia Fowles (9); Asts: Courtney Vandersloot (8)	Pts: Jonquel Jones (29); Rebs: Jonquel Jones (13); Asts: Sue Bird/Skylar Diggins-Smith (6)

Wintrust Arena, Chicago, Illinois
Attendance: 9,572
Referees: Isaac Barnett, Tim Greene, Toni Patillo

=== Rule Changes ===
The WNBA put in three special rules for the 2022 All-Star Game:

- 4-Point Shot
  - Four circles – two at each end of the court – were placed above the current three-point line
- 20-Second Shot Clock
- Automatic Points for Free-Throw Attempts: “No Free-Throws”

== Three-Point Contest & Skills Challenge ==
On June 2, 2022, it was announced that there would be a Three-Point Contest and Skills Challenge on July 9, the night before the All-Star game. It was televised on ESPN in the US and across the TSN Network in Canada. This is the first time since 2019 that it was held. The Three-Point Contest was sponsored by Mountain Dew. The 3-PT Contest and WNBA Skills Challenge took place indoors at McCormick Place for a special audience of participants in the Girls Nike Nationals

=== Three-Point Contest ===
The contestants for the Mountain Dew 3-Point Contest were announced on July 7, 2022. 3-Time Champion Allie Quigley was the only non-All-Star to be in the competition. The Three-Point Shootout is a two-round, timed competition in which five shooting locations are positioned around the three-point arc. Four racks contain four WNBA balls (each worth one point) and one “money” ball (worth two points). The fifth station is a special “all money ball” rack, which each participant can place at any of the five locations. Every ball on this rack is worth two points. Two balls were placed on pedestals between racks 2 and 3 and racks 3 and 4 in “THE DEW ZONE”. Each of these balls is worth three points. The players have one minute and ten seconds to shoot as many of the 27 balls as they can. The three competitors with the highest scores in the first round advance to the championship round.

Position	Player	From	2022 Season 3-point statistics			1st Round	2nd Round
Position	Player	From	Made	Attempted	Percent	1st Round	2nd Round
G	Allie Quigley	Chicago	28	82	34.1	26	30
G	Ariel Atkins	Washington	49	130	37.7	24	21
G	Rhyne Howard	Atlanta	50	148	33.8	24	14
G	Arike Ogunbowale	Dallas	67	180	37.2	21	–
G	Jewell Loyd	Seattle	56	146	38.4	18	–
G	Kelsey Plum	Las Vegas	71	169	42.0	14	–

=== Skills Challenge ===
On July 8, 2022, the WNBA announced the eight competitors that would be involved in the Skills Challenge. The Skills Challenge were teams consisting of one WNBA player and one athlete from the Elite Youth Basketball League (EYBL) participating in the 2022 Nike Nationals. The teams competed head-to-head in an obstacle course relay competition that tests dribbling, passing, agility and shooting skills. A three-round, bracket-style event, the Skills Challenge featured two teams competing simultaneously on an identical course. The team that successfully completes the course first shall be deemed the winner of that matchup and advance to the next round of the competition.

Skills Competitors
Position	Player	Team
G	Rhyne Howard	Atlanta Dream
G	Sabrina Ionescu	New York Liberty
F	Jonquel Jones	Connecticut Sun
G	Kelsey Plum	Las Vegas Aces
F	NaLyssa Smith	Indiana Fever
F/C	Azurá Stevens	Chicago Sky
G	Courtney Vandersloot	Chicago Sky
G	Jackie Young	Las Vegas Aces

=== Skills Challenge Bracket ===
1st Round
Team Howard (Atlanta)	X
Team Plum (Las Vegas)	O
Team Ionescu (New York)	O
Team Stevens (Chicago)	X
Team Jones (Connecticut)	O
Team Young (Las Vegas)	X
Team Smith (Indiana)	O
Team Vandersloot (Chicago)	X

Semi-Finals
Team Plum (Las Vegas)	X
Team Ionescu (New York)	O
Team Jones (Connecticut)	X
Team Smith (Indiana)	O

Final
Team Ionescu (New York)	O
Team Smith (Indiana)	X
