= WNBA All-Star Game Most Valuable Player =

Women's National Basketball Association award

The Women's National Basketball Association All-Star Game Most Valuable Player (MVP) is an annual Women's National Basketball Association (WNBA) award given to the player voted best of the annual All-Star Game. The all-star game began during the 1999 WNBA season, the third year of the WNBA. There was no game held in 2004, 2008, 2010, 2012, or 2016.

Lisa Leslie and Maya Moore have won the most awards, with 3 selections each.

== Winners ==
	Denotes player who is still active in the WNBA
	Denotes player whose team won the championship that year
°	Inducted into the Women's Basketball Hall of Fame
	Inducted into the Naismith Memorial Basketball Hall of Fame
*	Denotes player named as the regular season MVP that year
†	Denotes player selected as All-Star during rookie season
Player (x)	Denotes the number of times the player has won
Team (x)	Denotes the number of times a player from team/franchise has won

Year	Player	Position	Nationality	Team	Ref.
1999	Lisa Leslie °	Center	United States	Los Angeles Sparks	
2000	Tina Thompson °	Forward	United States	Houston Comets	
2001	Lisa Leslie ° * (2)	Center	United States	Los Angeles Sparks (2)	
2002	Lisa Leslie ° (3)	Center	United States	Los Angeles Sparks (3)	
2003	Nikki Teasley	Guard	United States	Los Angeles Sparks (4)	
2004	The Game at Radio City				
2005	Sheryl Swoopes ° *	Guard / Forward	United States	Houston Comets (2)	
2006	Katie Douglas	Guard / Forward	United States	Connecticut Sun	
2007	Cheryl Ford	Forward	United States	Detroit Shock	
2008	No game held due to the 2008 Summer Olympics				
2009	Swin Cash °	Forward	United States	Seattle Storm	
2010	Stars at the Sun				
2011	Swin Cash ° (2)	Forward	United States	Seattle Storm (2)	
2012	No game held due to the 2012 Summer Olympics				
2013	Candace Parker ° *	Center	United States	Los Angeles Sparks (5)	
2014	Shoni Schimmel †	Guard	United States	Atlanta Dream	
2015	Maya Moore °	Forward	United States	Minnesota Lynx	
2016	No game held due to the 2016 Summer Olympics				
2017	Maya Moore ° (2)	Forward	United States	Minnesota Lynx (2)	
2018	Maya Moore ° (3)	Forward	United States	Minnesota Lynx (3)	
2019	Erica Wheeler	Guard	United States	Indiana Fever	
2020	No game held due to the COVID-19 pandemic				
2021	Arike Ogunbowale	Guard	United States	Dallas Wings (2)	
2022	Kelsey Plum	Guard	United States	Las Vegas Aces	
2023	Jewell Loyd	Guard	United States	Seattle Storm (3)	
2024	Arike Ogunbowale (2)	Guard	United States	Dallas Wings (3)	
2025	Napheesa Collier	Forward	United States	Minnesota Lynx (4)	

== Notes ==
- In 2004, The Game at Radio City (held in place of a traditional All-Star Game) was a contest between the USA team scheduled to compete at the 2004 Summer Olympics and a single WNBA team. This is not considered an All-Star game. Yolanda Griffith of Team USA won the MVP award.
- The 2008 WNBA All-Star Game was canceled due to the 2008 Summer Olympics.
- In 2010, the Stars at the Sun game (held in place of a traditional All-Star Game) was a contest between the USA team scheduled to compete at the upcoming 2010 FIBA World Championship for Women and a single WNBA team. This is not considered an All-Star Game. Sylvia Fowles of Team USA won the MVP award.
- The 2012 WNBA All-Star Game was canceled due to the 2012 Summer Olympics.
- The 2016 WNBA All-Star Game was canceled due to the 2016 Summer Olympics.

== Multi-time winners ==
Awards	Player	Team(s)	Years
3	Lisa Leslie	Los Angeles Sparks	1999, 2002, 2003
3	Maya Moore	Minnesota Lynx	2015, 2017, 2018
2	Swin Cash	Seattle Storm	2009, 2011
2	Arike Ogunbowale	Dallas Wings	2021, 2024

== See also ==
- List of sports awards honoring women
- WNBA All-Star Game
- WNBA Three-Point Contest
- WNBA Most Valuable Player Award
- NBA All-Star Game Most Valuable Player Award
