= 2014 WNBA All-Star Game =

Exhibition basketball game

| | 1 | 2 | 3 | 4 | OT | Total |
|---|---|---|---|---|---|---|
| East | 27 | 30 | 28 | 27 | 13 | 125 |
| West | 28 | 25 | 33 | 26 | 12 | 124 |
- Date: July 19, 2014
- Arena: US Airways Center
- City: Phoenix, Arizona
- MVP: Shoni Schimmel
- Attendance: 14,685
- Network: ABC
- Announcers: Ryan Ruocco; Rebecca Lobo; Holly Rowe

WNBA All-Star Game
| < 2013 | 2015 > |

The 2014 WNBA All-Star Game was an exhibition basketball game played on July 19, 2014 at the venue then known as US Airways Center (now Footprint Center) in Phoenix, Arizona, the current home of the Phoenix Mercury. This was the 12th edition of the WNBA All-Star Game, and was played during the 2014 WNBA season. This was the second time the event had been held in Phoenix, the other being the 2000 game.

Starters for the game were selected by fan voting and announced on July 8, 2014. Fans were able to select three frontcourt players and two guards. The leading vote-getter was Maya Moore of the Minnesota Lynx with 28,389 votes. Shoni Schimmel won the MVP of the All-Star game and led the Eastern Conference to a 125-124 victory over the Western Conference.

== Coaches ==
Under All-Star Game rules, the coaches came from the previous year's conference champions, provided that they were still in the same positions. Cheryl Reeve, coach of the defending WNBA and West champion Lynx, coached the Western Conference for the second straight year. Because Fred Williams, who coached the Atlanta Dream to the Eastern Conference title in 2013, took the same position with the Tulsa Shock before the 2014 season, he was not eligible to serve as an All-Star head coach. Williams' successor in Atlanta, Michael Cooper, was selected as the East coach based on the Dream's conference-leading 11–4 record through games on June 29.

== Players ==
=== Eastern Conference ===
Frontcourt starters were Elena Delle Donne of the Chicago Sky, the East's top vote-getter for the second time in her two WNBA seasons; Angel McCoughtry of the Dream; and Tamika Catchings of the Indiana Fever. Starting guards for the East were Dream rookie Shoni Schimmel and Cappie Pondexter of the New York Liberty. Schimmel's selection marked the third consecutive All-Star Game in which at least one rookie had been voted in as a starter, following Moore in 2011 and Delle Donne and Brittney Griner in 2013.

Reserves for both conferences were announced on July 15 during the Los Angeles Sparks–Indiana Fever game, televised by ESPN2. East reserves in the frontcourt were Jessica Breland of the Sky, Tina Charles of the Liberty, Chiney Ogwumike of the Connecticut Sun, and Érika de Souza of the Dream; reserve guards were Katie Douglas of the Sun and Briann January of the Fever.

=== Western Conference ===
Along with Moore, frontcourt starters for the West were Candace Parker of the Sparks and Griner of the Mercury. Starting guards for the West were Diana Taurasi of the Mercury and Skylar Diggins of the Shock. West reserves in the frontcourt were Candice Dupree of the Mercury, Glory Johnson of the Shock, and Nneka Ogwumike of the Sparks, and reserve guards were Seimone Augustus and Lindsay Whalen of the Lynx and Danielle Robinson of the San Antonio Stars. Notably, Chiney and Nneka Oguwmike became the first set of sisters ever selected to the same All-Star Game.

=== Replacements ===
Two initially chosen players were unable to play in the game. East starter Delle Donne was ruled out due to a flare-up of Lyme disease, while West reserve Augustus was sidelined by bursitis in her left knee. Delle Donne was replaced on the roster by Ivory Latta of the Washington Mystics, and Augustus by Sue Bird of the Seattle Storm. Delle Donne's place in the East starting lineup was taken by Souza.

== Rosters ==
Eastern Conference
| Pos | Player | Team | No. of selections |
Starters
| F | Tamika Catchings | Indiana Fever | 9 |
| F | Angel McCoughtry | Atlanta Dream | 3 |
| G | Cappie Pondexter | New York Liberty | 6 |
| G | Shoni Schimmel | Atlanta Dream | 1 |
| C | Érika de Souza | Atlanta Dream | 3 |
Reserves
| F | Jessica Breland | Chicago Sky | 1 |
| C | Tina Charles | New York Liberty | 3 |
| F | Elena Delle Donne^{INJ} | Chicago Sky | 2 |
| G | Katie Douglas | Connecticut Sun | 5 |
| G | Briann January | Indiana Fever | 1 |
| F | Ivory Latta | Washington Mystics | 2 |
| F | Chiney Ogwumike | Connecticut Sun | 1 |

Western Conference
| Pos | Player | Team | No. of selections |
Starters
| G | Skylar Diggins | Tulsa Shock | 1 |
| C | Brittney Griner | Phoenix Mercury | 2 |
| F | Maya Moore | Minnesota Lynx | 3 |
| F | Candace Parker | Los Angeles Sparks | 3 |
| G | Diana Taurasi | Phoenix Mercury | 7 |
Reserves
| G | Seimone Augustus^{INJ} | Minnesota Lynx | 5 |
| G | Sue Bird | Seattle Storm | 8 |
| F | Candice Dupree | Phoenix Mercury | 4 |
| F | Glory Johnson | Tulsa Shock | 2 |
| F | Nneka Ogwumike | Los Angeles Sparks | 2 |
| G | Danielle Robinson | San Antonio Stars | 2 |
| G | Lindsay Whalen | Minnesota Lynx | 5 |

^INJUnable to play due to illness or injury

=== Game ===
ESPN

July 19, 2014
3:30 p.m. ET

Box score

Eastern Conference 125, Western Conference 124 (OT)
Scoring by quarter: 27-28, 30–25, 28-33, 27-26, Overtime: 13–12
| Pts: Schimmel 29; Rebs: Catchings 13; Asts: Schimmel 8 | Pts: Diggins 27; Rebs: N. Ogwumike 11; Asts: Moore 8 |

US Airways Center, Phoenix, Arizona
Attendance: 14,685
Referees:
- #8 Daryl Humphrey
- #34 Maj Forsberg
- #39 Michael Price

The game was marked by records and milestones:

- Tamika Catchings was selected for the ninth time, tying her with Tina Thompson for the most selections. Catchings also took sole possession of the record for most All-Star Game appearances, with eight.
- This was the first All-Star Game to go to overtime.
- Three players broke the previous All-Star Game scoring record of 23 points set last year by Candace Parker. Shoni Schimmel scored 23 points after the halftime break, finishing with 29; Skylar Diggins had 27, and Maya Moore 24.
- Brittney Griner's 17 points included the third dunk in All-Star Game history. This gave her four dunks in her two WNBA seasons; at game time, all other WNBA players in history had six.

The game was close throughout, but the East took a fourth-quarter lead, forcing the West to rally to take the game into overtime. The West took a 7-point lead with 1:59 to play, but the East scored the game's final 8 points, capped by a Catchings layup with 6.9 seconds left. Catchings then sealed the East win by knocking the ball away from Diggins. MVP honors went to Schimmel, a rookie who at the time was not starting for the Atlanta Dream and had been voted in as a starter mainly because of her huge following among her fellow Native Americans.
