= 2001 WNBA All-Star Game =

Exhibition basketball game

	1	2	Total
West	40	40	80
East	30	42	72
- Date: July 16, 2001
- Arena: TD Waterhouse Centre
- City: Orlando, Florida
- MVP: Lisa Leslie
- Attendance: 16,906

WNBA All-Star Game
< 2000	2002 >

The 2001 WNBA All-Star Game was played on July 16, 2001, at TD Waterhouse Centre in Orlando, Florida. This was the 3rd annual WNBA All-Star Game. The West defeated the East, 80–72, and Lisa Leslie was named the All-Star Game MVP after recording 20 points and nine rebounds.

== Rosters ==
Western Conference All-Stars
Pos.	Player	Team	Selection #
Starters
G	(Portugal) Ticha Penicheiro	Sacramento Monarchs	3rd
G	(Brazil) Janeth Arcain	Houston Comets	1st
F	(United States) Tina Thompson	Houston Comets	3rd
F	(United States) Ruthie Bolton-Holifield	Sacramento Monarchs	2nd
C	(United States) Yolanda Griffith	Sacramento Monarchs	3rd
Reserves
G	(United States) Tamecka Dixon	Los Angeles Sparks	1st
G	(United States) Jackie Stiles	Portland Fire	1st
F	(United States) Katie Smith	Minnesota Lynx	2nd
F	(United States) Natalie Williams ^{1}	Utah Starzz	3rd
F	(Australia) Lauren Jackson	Seattle Storm	1st
C	(United States) Lisa Leslie	Los Angeles Sparks	3rd

Eastern Conference All-Stars
Pos.	Player	Team	Selection #
Starters
G	(United States) Teresa Weatherspoon	New York Liberty	3rd
G	(United States) Nikki McCray	Washington Mystics	3rd
G	(United States) Vickie Johnson	New York Liberty	2nd
F	(United States) Chamique Holdsclaw ^{1}	Washington Mystics	3rd
C	(United States) Tari Phillips	New York Liberty	2nd
Reserves
G	(United States) Merlakia Jones	Cleveland Rockers	3rd
G	(United States) Nykesha Sales ^{2}	Orlando Miracle	3rd
G	(United States) Dawn Staley	Charlotte Sting	1st
G	(United States) Andrea Stinson	Charlotte Sting	2nd
G	(United States) Rita Williams ^{2}	Indiana Fever	1st
F	(Russia) Elena Baranova	Miami Sol	1st
F	(United States) Taj McWilliams ^{3}	Orlando Miracle	3rd
F	(United States) Chasity Melvin ^{1}	Cleveland Rockers	1st

- ^{1} Injured
- ^{2} Injury replacement
- ^{3} Starting in place of injured player

== Game ==
ESPN

July 16
8:00 p.m.

Western Conference 80, Eastern Conference 72
Pts: Lisa Leslie 20; Rebs: Lisa Leslie 9 Asts: Ticha Penicheiro 5	Pts: Merlakia Jones 12; Rebs: Tari Phillips 9 Asts: Dawn Staley 3

TD Waterhouse Centre, Orlando, Florida
Attendance: 16,906
Referees: Melissa Barlow, Michael Price, Bonita Spence

=== Coaches ===
The coach for the Western Conference was Houston Comets coach Van Chancellor. The coach for the Eastern Conference was New York Liberty coach Richie Adubato.
