= 2015 WNBA All-Star Game =

Exhibition basketball game

	1	2	3	4	Total
West	24	34	35	24	117
East	34	25	32	21	112
- Date: July 25, 2015
- Arena: Mohegan Sun Arena
- City: Uncasville, Connecticut
- MVP: Maya Moore
- Attendance: 8,214
- Network: ABC

WNBA All-Star Game
< 2014	2017 >

The 2015 WNBA All-Star Game is an exhibition basketball game. It was played on July 25, 2015. The Connecticut Sun hosted a WNBA All-Star Game for the fourth and final time. The Sun previously hosted the game in 2005, 2009, and 2013.

Starters for the game were selected by fan voting. Fans were able to select three frontcourt players and two guards. Elena Delle Donne of the Chicago Sky led voting with 18,034 votes. Maya Moore won the MVP of the All-Star game and led the Western Conference to a 117–112 victory over the Eastern Conference.

== Coaches ==
Coaches were determined by the previous year's conference championships. Sandy Brondello, coach of the defending WNBA and West champion Phoenix Mercury coached the Western Conference, while Pokey Chatman, coach of the defending East champion Chicago Sky, coached the East. It was the first time coaching the All-Star Game for both coaches.

== Players ==
=== Eastern Conference ===
In addition to Elena Delle Donne, Shoni Schimmel of the Atlanta Dream were voted as backcourt starters for the East, with Angel McCoughtry of the Dream, Tamika Catchings of the Fever, and Tina Charles of the New York Liberty as frontcourt starters.

Reserves included Stefanie Dolson and Emma Meesseman of the Washington Mystics, Cappie Pondexter of the Chicago Sky, Alex Bentley and Kelsey Bone of the Sun, and Marissa Coleman of the Fever.

=== Western Conference ===
Guard Skylar Diggins of the Tulsa Shock was the top vote getter in the West, and was joined in the backcourt by Seimone Augustus of the Minnesota Lynx. Starting frontcourt for the West were Maya Moore of the Minnesota Lynx, Brittney Griner and Candice Dupree of the Phoenix Mercury. Both Diggins and Augustus were unable to play due to a knee injury, and was replaced in the starting lineup by Sue Bird of the Storm and DeWanna Bonner of the Mercury respectively.

Reserves included Lindsay Whalen of the Lynx, Nneka Ogwumike of the Sparks, Plenette Pierson of the Tulsa Shock, and Danielle Robinson of the San Antonio Stars. Whalen was unable to play due to an eye injury, and Jantel Lavender of the Sparks, Kayla McBride of the Stars, and Riquna Williams of the Shock were named as an injury replacement for Diggins, Augustus, and Whalen respectively.

== Rosters ==
Eastern Conference All-Stars
Pos	Player	Team	No. of selections	Votes
Starters
Backcourt	Elena Delle Donne	Chicago Sky	3	18,034
Backcourt	Shoni Schimmel	Atlanta Dream	2	8,881
Frontcourt	Tamika Catchings	Indiana Fever	10	9,923
Frontcourt	Angel McCoughtry	Atlanta Dream	4	7,619
Frontcourt	Tina Charles	New York Liberty	4	6,129
Reserves
Backcourt	Alex Bentley	Connecticut Sun	1	—
Frontcourt	Kelsey Bone	Connecticut Sun	1	—
Backcourt	Marissa Coleman	Indiana Fever	1	—
Frontcourt	Stefanie Dolson	Washington Mystics	1	—
Frontcourt	Emma Meesseman	Washington Mystics	1	—
Backcourt	Cappie Pondexter	Chicago Sky	7	—
Head coach: Pokey Chatman

Western Conference All-Stars
Pos	Player	Team	No. of selections	Votes
Starters
Backcourt	Skylar Diggins^{INJ}	Tulsa Shock	2	15,895
Backcourt	Seimone Augustus^{INJ}	Minnesota Lynx	6	9,599
Frontcourt	Maya Moore	Minnesota Lynx	4	13,706
Frontcourt	Brittney Griner	Phoenix Mercury	3	7,138
Frontcourt	Candice Dupree	Phoenix Mercury	5	5,954
Reserves
Backcourt	Sue Bird^{ST}	Seattle Storm	9	—
Backcourt	DeWanna Bonner^{ST}	Phoenix Mercury	1	—
Frontcourt	Jantel Lavender^{REP}	Los Angeles Sparks	1	—
Backcourt	Kayla McBride^{REP}	San Antonio Stars	1	—
Frontcourt	Nneka Ogwumike	Los Angeles Sparks	3	—
Frontcourt	Plenette Pierson	Tulsa Shock	1	—
Backcourt	Danielle Robinson	San Antonio Stars	3	—
Backcourt	Lindsay Whalen^{INJ}	Minnesota Lynx	5	—
Backcourt	Riquna Williams^{REP}	Tulsa Shock	1	—
Head coach: Sandy Brondello

Notes

- INJ Injured
- ST Starting in place of injured player
- REP Injury replacement

== Game ==
ABC

July 25, 2015
3:30 p.m. ET

Box score

Western Conference 117, Eastern Conference 112
Scoring by quarter: 24-34, 34–25, 35-32, 24-21
Pts: Moore 30; Rebs: Lavender 12; Asts: Robinson 7	Pts: Bentley 23; Rebs: Catchings 10; Asts: Catchings and Schimmel 6

Mohegan Sun Arena, Uncasville, Connecticut
Attendance: 8,214
Referees:
- #9 Denise Brooks
- #21 Byron Jarrett
- #55 Eric Brewton
