= Shoni Schimmel =

American basketball player (born 1992)

Personal information
- Born: May 4, 1992 (age 34) Pendleton, Oregon, U.S.
- Listed height: 5 ft 9 in (1.75 m)
- Listed weight: 161 lb (73 kg)

Career information
- High school: Hermiston (Hermiston, Oregon); Franklin (Portland, Oregon)
- College: Louisville (2010–2014)
- WNBA draft: 2014: 1st round, 8th overall pick
- Drafted by: Atlanta Dream
- Playing career: 2014–2018
- Position: Point guard / shooting guard
- Number: 23, 5

Career history
- 2014–2015: Atlanta Dream
- 2016: New York Liberty
- 2018: Las Vegas Aces

Career highlights
- 2× WNBA All-Star (2014, 2015); WNBA All-Star Game MVP (2014); All-American – USBWA (2014); Second-team All-American – AP (2014); First-team All-AAC (2014); 2× First-team All-Big East (2012, 2013); Big East All-Freshman Team (2011)
- Stats at WNBA.com
- Stats at Basketball Reference
Medals
Women's basketball
Representing United States
World University Games
Gold medal – first place	2013 Kazan	Team

Shoni Schimmel (born May 4, 1992) is an American former professional basketball player. She is a former All-American college player at the University of Louisville and was selected with the eighth overall pick in the first round of the 2014 draft by the Atlanta Dream.

== Early life and high school ==
Schimmel, a 5'9" shooting guard, first received attention as a high school player in Oregon. Raised on the Confederated Tribes of the Umatilla Indian Reservation in Mission, Oregon, she was the subject of a documentary by filmmaker Jonathan Hock called Off the Rez, which chronicled her journey to earn an NCAA scholarship with her basketball ability. She transferred from Hermiston High School in eastern Oregon to the larger Franklin High School in Portland, Oregon, to increase her chances of being recruited to a Division I school. After her senior year at Franklin, Schimmel was named a first team All-American by Parade magazine.

Schimmel was selected to the 2010 Women's Basketball Coaches Association High School Coaches' All-America Team. The top twenty high school players in the country are named as WBCA All-Americans, and eligible to play in the all-star game. She participated in the 2010 WBCA High School All-America Game, scoring six points.

== College career ==
Schimmel chose Louisville for college and became a four-year starter for the Cardinals. As a junior in 2012–13, Schimmel led the team to the championship game of the 2013 Tournament. In her senior season, Schimmel averaged 17.1 points per game to lead the team in scoring and was named an All-American by the USBWA and Associated Press.

For her career, she finished second on the Louisville career scoring list, finishing with 2,174 points.

== College statistics ==
Legend
GP	Games played	GS	Games started	MPG	Minutes per game
FG%	Field goal percentage	3P%	3-point field goal percentage	FT%	Free throw percentage
RPG	Rebounds per game	APG	Assists per game	SPG	Steals per game
BPG	Blocks per game	PPG	Points per game	**Bold**	Career high

Year	Team	GP	Points	FG%	3P%	FT%	RPG	APG	SPG	BPG	PPG
2010–11	Louisville	35	528	**40.0**	36.5	69.8	3.6	**4.9**	2.1	0.1	15.1
2011–12	Louisville	31	444	35.3	29.9	72.5	**4.5**	4.7	**2.4**	**0.5**	14.3
2012–13	Louisville	**38**	539	39.1	32.9	79.2	3.1	3.6	1.7	0.3	14.2
2013–14	Louisville	**38**	**663**	39.7	**37.6**	**81.7**	**4.5**	3.8	1.3	0.2	**17.4**
Career	Louisville	142	2174	38.7	34.4	76.9	3.9	4.2	1.8	0.3	15.3

== USA Basketball ==
Schimmel was selected to be a member of the team representing the US at the 2013 World University Games held in Kazan, Russia. The team, coached by Sherri Coale, won the opening four games easily, scoring in triple digits in each game, and winning by 30 or more points in each case. After winning the quarterfinal game against Sweden, they faced Australia in the semifinal. The USA team opened up as much as a 17-point lead in the fourth quarter of the game but the Australian team fought back and took a one-point lead in the final minute. Crystal Bradford scored a basket with 14 seconds left in the game to secure a 79–78 victory. The gold medal opponent was Russia, but the USA team never trailed, and won 90–71 to win the gold medal and the World University games Championship. Schimmel averaged 4.6 points per game.

== Professional career ==
On April 14, 2014, Schimmel was selected in the first round of the 2014 WNBA draft (eighth pick overall) by the Atlanta Dream. Despite coming off the bench, Schimmel had an impressive rookie season, averaging 8.3 ppg and was voted a WNBA All-Star starter, becoming just the third reserve in league history to achieve that. In her first career game, Schimmel scored 7 points to go with a franchise-record 11 assists against the San Antonio Stars. In a regular season game win against the Phoenix Mercury, Schimmel scored a career-high 24 points, where she scored 20 of them in the second quarter, becoming one of six players in WNBA history to score 20 or more points in a quarter. She also earned recognition as the 2014 WNBA All-Star Game Most Valuable Player on July 19, 2014, in Phoenix, Arizona, as Schimmel out battled Skylar Diggins by scoring a then WNBA All-Star Game record 29 points (which would be broken by Maya Moore the following year). In 2014, her jersey was the league's best seller. Some of the other WNBA franchises have held events honoring Native Americans when the Dream is the visiting team. With Schimmel's productivity on the court along with a supporting cast of Sancho Lyttle, all-star center Érika de Souza and superstar small forward Angel McCoughtry, the Atlanta Dream were the number one seed in the Eastern Conference, but were upset in the first round of the playoffs, losing 2–1 to the fourth-seeded Chicago Sky.

In the 2015 season, Schimmel averaged 7.6 ppg despite starting in more games than she did in her rookie season. However, she was voted once again as a WNBA all-star starter, but the Dream never made it to the playoffs. Schimmel led the team in assists throughout the whole season.

Right before the 2016 season, Schimmel was traded to the New York Liberty in exchange for a 2017 second-round draft pick. Despite being a two-time all-star, Schimmel would have a significantly reduced role on the team while averaging career lows in minutes per game (4.5 mpg) and points per game (2.1 ppg). She was also out of shape coming into training camp which ultimately led to the amount of playing time she would get. Midway through the season, Schimmel suffered a concussion that would cause her to miss the rest of the season, including the playoffs.

In May 2017, it was announced that Schimmel would be sitting out the 2017 WNBA season due to personal issues.

In April 2018, Schimmel made her return to the Liberty in training camp but would be waived a month later before the start of the 2018 WNBA season.

On May 15, 2018, Schimmel signed with the Las Vegas Aces. On May 23, 2018, Schimmel was waived by the Aces.

== Personal life ==
Schimmel has a younger sister, Jude, who was also a teammate of hers at Louisville. Her youngest sister, Milan, played basketball for the University of Cincinnati. She has five brothers: Shae, Mick, Saint, Job and Sun. Her parents are Ceci and Rick Schimmel. On June 15, 2021, she was arrested for felony assault and criminal mischief.

== WNBA career statistics ==
Legend
GP	Games played	GS	Games started	MPG	Minutes per game	RPG	Rebounds per game
APG	Assists per game	SPG	Steals per game	BPG	Blocks per game	PPG	Points per game
TO	Turnovers per game	FG%	Field-goal percentage	3P%	3-point field-goal percentage	FT%	Free-throw percentage
**Bold**	Career best	°	League leader

=== Regular season ===
Year	Team	GP	GS	MPG	FG%	3P%	FT%	RPG	APG	SPG	BPG	TO	PPG
2014	Atlanta	**34**	2	**21.0**	.374	.342	.840	**2.7**	**5.7**	**0.7**	0.0	2.4	**8.3**
2015	Atlanta	32	**16**	19.8	.378	.383	**.857**	2.5	3.2	**0.7**	**0.1**	2.3	7.6
2016	New York	17	0	4.5	**.550**	**.563**	.800	0.5	0.6	0.1	0.0	**0.4**	2.1
2018	Las Vegas	2	0	6.4	.000	.000	.000	1.0	0.5	0.0	0.0	0.5	0.0
Career	4 years, 3 teams	85	18	17.0	.379	.366	.845	1.9	2.8	0.6	0.1	2.0	6.6

=== Postseason ===
Year	Team	GP	GS	MPG	FG%	3P%	FT%	RPG	APG	SPG	BPG	TO	PPG
2014	Atlanta	3	3	19.7	.368	.375	.840	5.7	3.6	1.0	0.0	2.3	6.3
Career	1 year, 1 team	3	3	19.7	.368	.375	.840	5.7	3.6	1.0	0.0	2.3	6.3

== See also ==
- Ryneldi Becenti
- Angel Goodrich
- Tahnee Robinson
