= 2018 WNBA All-Star Game =

Exhibition basketball game

	1	2	3	4	Total
Team Parker	27	23	34	35	119
Team Delle Donne	31	23	24	34	112
- Date: July 28, 2018
- Arena: Target Center
- City: Minneapolis, Minnesota
- MVP: Maya Moore (Team Parker)
- Attendance: 15,922
- Network: ABC

WNBA All-Star Game
< 2017	2019 >

The 2018 WNBA All-Star Game was an exhibition basketball game played on July 28, 2018. The Minnesota Lynx hosted the WNBA All-Star Game for the first time.

== Rosters ==
=== Selection ===
On June 5, the WNBA announced that 2018 would have a new roster selection format for the All-Star Game. Fans, WNBA players, head coaches, sports writers and broadcasters would all be able to vote for All Stars. Fans could vote for 10 players, while the groups vote for 22 players (9 guards and 13 front court players). Players and coaches cannot vote for members of their own team. Voting began on June 19, 2018, at 2 PM EDT, and ended on July 12, 2018, at 11:59 PM EDT.

The voting will be weighted as follows:

Voting group	Vote weight
Fans	40%
WNBA players	20%
Head coaches	20%
Sports media	20%

Players were not allowed to vote for their teammates. Head coaches could not vote for players on their own team. The top 22 players receiving votes based on this weighting would be selected to the All-Star Game. There would not be a restriction on number of players from one conference. The top two vote-getters would be captains of the two All-Star teams and select their teams from the pool of remaining 20 players. The 22 All-Stars were revealed on July 17, 2018. Rosters were revealed on July 19, 2018, during ESPN2's coverage of the Washington Mystics at the Dallas Wings.

=== Head coaches ===
The head coaches of the two teams will be the head coaches from the two WNBA teams with the best records following games on July 13. On July 12, 2018, the two teams with the best records were determined when the Dallas Wings defeated the Los Angeles Sparks. The Seattle Storm had the best record in the league and the Phoenix Mercury had the second best. Therefore, Dan Hughes was to coach the team captained by the highest All-Star vote getter (Team Delle Donne), and Sandy Brondello would be the coach of the team captained by the second highest All-Star vote getter (Team Parker).

=== All-Star pool ===
The players for the All-Star Game were selected by the voting process described above. The 22 players that would participate in the All-Star Game were announced on July 17, 2018, on Sportscenter. Maya Moore and Elena Delle Donne were the two leading vote-getters and would be the captains of the two All-Star teams. Moore decline the role of captain, and president Lisa Borders named Candace Parker as the replacement captain, due to Parker being the next-leading vote-getter. The selections were led by the Western Conference, with 16 selections, while the Eastern Conference had six players selected.

Eastern Conference All-Stars
Pos	Player	Team	No. of selections
Players
G	Allie Quigley	Chicago Sky	2
G	Kristi Toliver	Washington Mystics	2
F	Angel McCoughtry	Atlanta Dream	5
F	Elena Delle Donne	Washington Mystics	5
F	Chiney Ogwumike	Connecticut Sun	2
C	Tina Charles	New York Liberty	6

Western Conference All-Stars
Pos	Player	Team	No. of selections
Players
G	Sue Bird	Seattle Storm	11
G	Skylar Diggins-Smith	Dallas Wings	4
G	Chelsea Gray	Los Angeles Sparks	2
G	Seimone Augustus	Minnesota Lynx	8
G	Jewell Loyd	Seattle Storm	1
G	Kayla McBride	Las Vegas Aces	2
G	Diana Taurasi	Phoenix Mercury	9
F	DeWanna Bonner	Phoenix Mercury	2
F	Maya Moore	Minnesota Lynx	6
F	Breanna Stewart	Seattle Storm	2
F	A'ja Wilson	Las Vegas Aces	1
F	Nneka Ogwumike^{INJ1}	Los Angeles Sparks	5
F	Rebekkah Brunson^{REP1}	Minnesota Lynx	5
F/C	Candace Parker	Los Angeles Sparks	5
C	Liz Cambage	Dallas Wings	2
C	Sylvia Fowles	Minnesota Lynx	5
C	Brittney Griner	Phoenix Mercury	5

=== Final rosters ===
Team Parker
Pos	Player	Team	No. of selections
Starters
G	Chelsea Gray	Los Angeles Sparks	2
F	Angel McCoughtry	Atlanta Dream	5
F	Maya Moore	Minnesota Lynx	6
F/C	Candace Parker	Los Angeles Sparks	5
C	Liz Cambage	Dallas Wings	2
Reserves
F	Rebekkah Brunson^{REP1}	Minnesota Lynx	5
C	Tina Charles	New York Liberty	6
G	Skylar Diggins-Smith	Dallas Wings	4
G	Jewell Loyd	Seattle Storm	1
F	Chiney Ogwumike	Connecticut Sun	2
G	Allie Quigley	Chicago Sky	2
F	Nneka Ogwumike^{INJ1}	Los Angeles Sparks	5
Head coach: Sandy Brondello (Phoenix Mercury)

Team Delle Donne
Pos	Player	Team	No. of selections
Starters
G	Sue Bird	Seattle Storm	11
G	Diana Taurasi	Phoenix Mercury	9
F	Elena Delle Donne	Washington Mystics	5
F	Breanna Stewart	Seattle Storm	2
C	Sylvia Fowles	Minnesota Lynx	5
Reserves
G	Seimone Augustus	Minnesota Lynx	8
F	DeWanna Bonner	Phoenix Mercury	2
C	Brittney Griner	Phoenix Mercury	5
G	Kayla McBride	Las Vegas Aces	2
G	Kristi Toliver	Washington Mystics	2
F	A'ja Wilson	Las Vegas Aces	1
Head coach: Dan Hughes (Seattle Storm)

^TBC Rosters as of July 25, 2018. Team rosters were announced on July 19, whereas the starters for each team were announced on July 27.
^INJ1 Nneka Ogwumike was unable to play due to illness.
^REP1 Rebekkah Brunson was selected as Nneka Ogwumike's replacement.

== Game ==
ABC

July 28, 2018
3:30 p.m. ET

Boxscore

Team Parker 119, Team Delle Donne 112
Scoring by quarter: 27–31, 23–23, 34–24, 35–34
Pts: Moore, Quigley 18; Rebs: Four players 8 Asts: Diggins-Smith 8	Pts: Toliver 23; Rebs: Three players 6 Asts: Bird 8

Target Center, Minneapolis, Minnesota
Attendance: 15,922
Referees:
- #23 Jeff Wooten
- #34 Maj Forsberg
- #44 Janetta Graham

== Three-Point Contest ==
On July 24, 2018, it was announced that the Three-Point Contest would return during halftime of the All-Star Game. For the second year in a row, the WNBA will donate $10,000 to a charity of the winner's choice.

=== Rules ===
The Three-Point Shootout is a two-round, timed competition in which five shooting locations are positioned around the three-point arc. Four racks contain four WNBA balls (each worth one point) and one “money” ball (worth two points). The fifth station is a special “all money ball” rack, which each participant can place at any of the five locations. Every ball on this rack is worth two points. The players have one minute to shoot as many of the 25 balls as they can. The two competitors with the highest scores in the first round advance to the championship round.

=== Results ===
Allie Quigly beat Kayla McBride in a tie breaker round, winning the 2018 WNBA three point contest.

Position	Player	From	2018 Season 3-point statistics			1st Round	2nd Round	Tiebreaker
Position	Player	From	Made	Attempted	Percent	1st Round	2nd Round	Tiebreaker
G	Allie Quigley	Chicago Sky	52	119	43.7	21	18	29
G	Kayla McBride	Las Vegas Aces	36	88	40.9	22	18	21
G	Kristi Toliver	Washington Mystics	52	144	36.1	20	-	-
G	Jewell Loyd	Seattle Storm	45	137	32.8	19	-	-
G	Renee Montgomery	Atlanta Dream	53	142	37.3	18	-	-
G	Kelsey Mitchell	Indiana Fever	55	157	35.0	16	-	-
