= 2017 WNBA All-Star Game =

Exhibition basketball game

	1	2	3	4	Total
East	30	34	21	36	121
West	35	29	32	34	130
- Date: July 22, 2017
- Arena: KeyArena
- City: Seattle, Washington
- MVP: Maya Moore (West)
- Attendance: 15,221
- Network: ABC
- Announcers: Ryan Ruocco, Rebecca Lobo, Holly Rowe, and LaChina Robinson

WNBA All-Star Game
< 2015	2018 >

The 2017 WNBA All-Star Game was an exhibition basketball game played on July 22, 2017. The Seattle Storm hosted a WNBA All-Star Game for the first time.

Starters for this year's All-Star game were selected by a combination of fan, media, and player voting. Fans accounted for 50% of the vote to determine the starters for Verizon WNBA All-Star 2017, while current players and a media panel accounted for 25% each. Maya Moore, of the Minnesota Lynx was the overall leader in votes with 32,866, with Elena Delle Donne, of the Washington Mystics, finishing in 2nd with 31,414 votes.

The Western Conference defeated the Eastern Conference with a 130-121 victory. Maya Moore was named MVP. Allie Quigley of the Chicago Sky won the Three-Point Contest.

== Coaches ==
The Minnesota Lynx and the New York Liberty had the best records in the Western and Eastern Conferences during the 2016 season, therefore making Cheryl Reeve and Bill Laimbeer the head coaches of the Western and Eastern Conference, respectively. Due to a family matter, Laimbeer was not able to coach. Curt Miller of the Connecticut Sun was named as his replacement, by having the best regular-season record in the East as of July 10. This is Reeve's third time coaching in the All-Star Game and Miller's first.

== Roster ==
The All-Star Game starters were announced on July 11, 2017 during SportsCenter. The All-Star Game reserves were announced on July 18, 2017 during the Seattle-Chicago game on ESPN2.

=== Eastern Conference ===
Tiffany Hayes of the Atlanta Dream and Jasmine Thomas of the Connecticut Sun were named the backcourt starters in the East, both of them earning their first All Star appearances. Elena Delle Donne of the Washington Mystics, her fourth selection, Tina Charles of the New York Liberty, her fifth selection, and Jonquel Jones of the Connecticut Sun, her first selection, were named the frontcourt starters.

The East reserves include Layshia Clarendon of the Atlanta Dream, Allie Quigley of the Chicago Sky, Alyssa Thomas of the Connecticut Sun, Stefanie Dolson of the Chicago Sky, Candice Dupree of the Indiana Fever, and Elizabeth Williams of the Atlanta Dream. With Delle Donne missing the game due to injury, Sugar Rodgers of the New York Liberty was named as a replacement. Clarendon, Quigley, Rodgers, Thomas, and Williams were all selected for the first time in their careers, while Dupree and Dolson were selected for their 6th and 2nd times, respectively.

=== Western Conference ===
Sue Bird of the Seattle Storm and Diana Taurasi of the Phoenix Mercury were named the starting backcourt in the West, earning their tenth and eighth selections, respectively. In the frontcourt, Maya Moore of the Minnesota Lynx was named to her fifth selection, along with Candace Parker of the Los Angeles Sparks and Sylvia Fowles of the Minnesota Lynx, both earning their fourth selection.

The West reserves include Seimone Augustus of the Minnesota Lynx, Skylar Diggins-Smith of the Dallas Wings, Chelsea Gray of the Los Angeles Sparks, Brittney Griner of the Phoenix Mercury, Nneka Ogwumike of the Los Angeles Sparks, and Breanna Stewart of the Seattle Storm. With Griner missing the game due to injury, Rebekkah Brunson of the Minnesota Lynx was named as a replacement. Gray and Stewart were named to their first All-Star teams, Brunson, Ogwumike, and Griner were named to their fourth team, Diggins-Smith was named to her third team, and Augustus was named to her seventh team.

== Rosters ==
Eastern Conference All-Stars
Pos	Player	Team	No. of selections
Starters
G	Tiffany Hayes	Atlanta Dream	1
G	Jasmine Thomas	Connecticut Sun	1
F/G	Elena Delle Donne^{INJ}	Washington Mystics	4
F/C	Jonquel Jones	Connecticut Sun	1
C	Tina Charles	New York Liberty	5
Reserves
G	Layshia Clarendon	Atlanta Dream	1
C	Stefanie Dolson	Chicago Sky	2
F	Candice Dupree	Indiana Fever	6
G	Allie Quigley	Chicago Sky	1
G	Sugar Rodgers^{REP}	New York Liberty	1
F	Alyssa Thomas^{ST}	Connecticut Sun	1
C	Elizabeth Williams	Atlanta Dream	1
Head coach: Curt Miller (Connecticut Sun)

Western Conference All-Stars
Pos	Player	Team	No. of selections
Starters
G	Sue Bird	Seattle Storm	10
G	Diana Taurasi	Phoenix Mercury	8
F	Maya Moore	Minnesota Lynx	5
F	Candace Parker	Los Angeles Sparks	4
C	Sylvia Fowles	Minnesota Lynx	4
Reserves
F/G	Seimone Augustus	Minnesota Lynx	7
F	Rebekkah Brunson^{REP}	Minnesota Lynx	4
G	Skylar Diggins-Smith	Dallas Wings	3
G	Chelsea Gray	Los Angeles Sparks	1
C	Brittney Griner^{INJ}	Phoenix Mercury	4
F	Nneka Ogwumike	Los Angeles Sparks	4
F/C	Breanna Stewart	Seattle Storm	1
Head coach: Cheryl Reeve (Minnesota Lynx)

Notes

- ^INJ Elena Delle Donne and Brittney Griner were unable to participate due to injuries. Griner suffered knee and ankle injuries and Delle Donne sustained a sprained ankle
- ^STStarting for Injured Player
- ^REPInjury Replacement

== Game ==
ABC

July 22, 2017
3:30 p.m. ET

Box score

Western Conference 130, Eastern Conference 121
Scoring by quarter: 35–30, 29–34, 32–21, 34–36
Pts: Maya Moore (23); Rebs: Candace Parker; Nneka Ogwumike (7); Asts: Sue Bird (11)	Pts: Jonquel Jones (24); Rebs: Jones (9); Asts: Layshia Clarendon (10)

KeyArena, Seattle, Washington
Attendance: 15,221
Referees:
- #7 Billy Smith
- #19 Tiara Cruse
- #25 Tiffany Bird

== Three-Point Contest ==
Five contestants participated in the Three-Point Contest, held during halftime of the All-Star Game. This was the first such contest held since the Stars at the Sun event that replaced the All-Star Game in 2010. Allie Quigley won the Three-Point Shootout with a Final Round score of 27 points. She defeated Sugar Rodgers, who scored 19 points. Quigley played for the Patrick Quigley Memorial Scholarship charity, which received $10,000 due to Quigley's win.

Position	Player	From	Year to ASG			1st	2nd
Position	Player	From	Made	Attempted	Percent	1st	2nd
G	Allie Quigley	Chicago Sky	47	106	.443	20	27
G	Sugar Rodgers	New York Liberty	39	109	.358	22	19
F	Maya Moore	Minnesota Lynx	33	82	.402	11	DNQ
G	Jasmine Thomas	Connecticut Sun	38	83	.458	10	DNQ
G	Sue Bird	Seattle Storm	36	84	.429	7	DNQ
