= 2011 WNBA All-Star Game =

Exhibition basketball game

	1	2	3	4	Total
East	33	32	27	26	118
West	36	30	26	21	113
- Date: July 23, 2011
- Arena: AT&T Center
- City: San Antonio, Texas
- MVP: Swin Cash
- Attendance: 12,540
- Network: ABC

WNBA All-Star Game
< 2010	2013 >

The 2011 WNBA All-Star Game was played on July 23, 2011 (3:30pm EDT on ABC) at the AT&T Center in San Antonio, Texas, home of the San Antonio Silver Stars. The game was the 10th WNBA All-Star Game, which has been held annually since 1999 except in 2004, 2008, and 2010. This was the first time San Antonio hosted the basketball showcase, and only the second time in league history for the game to be held by a Western Conference franchise.

In a game that saw neither team lead by more than 5 points, the Eastern Conference won 118–113 for only their third victory in 10 tries. Swin Cash of the Seattle Storm, who had 21 points and 12 rebounds in a losing effort, was named game MVP for the second time; only Lisa Leslie had previously earned multiple All-Star Game MVP awards.

The game also saw a record of 10 players (11 counting the injured, Candace Parker) make their debuts on a WNBA All-Star team—however, five of these players had appeared in the Stars at the Sun game in 2010, which is not considered an All-Star Game.

== The All-Star Game ==
=== Rosters ===
2011 Eastern Conference All-Stars roster
Players
Coaches

S.	Pos.	No.	Nat.	Name	Height	Weight	DOB	From	Selection
(S)	SG	23	(United States)	Pondexter, Cappie	5' 9" (1.75m)	160 lb (73kg)	1983-01-07	New York Liberty	4th
(S)	SG	23	(United States)	Douglas, Katie	6' 0" (1.83m)	165 lb (75kg)	1979-05-07	Indiana Fever	4th
(S)	SF	24	(United States)	Catchings, Tamika	6' 1" (1.85m)	167 lb (76kg)	1979-07-21	Indiana Fever	7th
(S)	SF	35	(United States)	McCoughtry, Angel	6' 1" (1.85m)	160 lb (73kg)	1986-09-10	Atlanta Dream	1st
(S)	C	31	(United States)	Charles, Tina	6' 4" (1.93m)	198 lb (90kg)	1988-12-05	Connecticut Sun	1st
	G	21	(United States)	Montgomery, Renee	5' 7" (1.7m)	143 lb (65kg)	1986-12-02	Connecticut Sun	1st
	G	10	(United States)	Prince, Epiphanny	5' 9" (1.75m)	165 lb (75kg)	1988-01-11	Chicago Sky	1st
	G	21	(United States)	Vandersloot, Courtney	5' 8" (1.73m)	130 lb (59kg)	1989-02-08	Chicago Sky	1st
	F	17	(United States)	Carson, Essence	6' 0" (1.83m)	165 lb (75kg)	1986-07-28	New York Liberty	1st
	F	1	(United States)	Langhorne, Crystal	6' 2" (1.88m)	190 lb (86kg)	1986-10-27	Washington Mystics	1st
	C	34	(United States)	Fowles, Sylvia	6' 6" (1.98m)	200 lb (91kg)	1985-10-06	Chicago Sky	2nd

Head coach
(United States) Marynell Meadors (Atlanta)
Assistant coaches
(United States) Carol Ross
(United States) Fred Williams
Athletic trainer
(United States) Kim Mosely

Legend

- (S) Starter
- (IR) Injury replacement
- (RS) Replacement for injured starter
- Injured

2011 Western Conference All-Stars roster
Players
Coaches

S.	Pos.	No.	Nat.	Name	Height	Weight	DOB	From	Selection
(S)	PG	10	(United States)	Bird, Sue	5' 9" (1.75m)	150 lb (68kg)	1980-10-16	Seattle Storm	7th
(S)	SG	3	(United States)	Taurasi, Diana	6' 0" (1.83m)	163 lb (74kg)	1982-06-11	Phoenix Mercury	5th
(S)	SF	23	(United States)	Moore, Maya	6' 0" (1.83m)	175 lb (79kg)	1989-06-11	Minnesota Lynx	1st
(S)	SF	2	(United States)	Cash, Swin	6' 1" (1.85m)	162 lb (73kg)	1979-09-22	Seattle Storm	4th
(S)	F/C	3	(United States)	Parker, Candace (injured)	6' 4" (1.93m)	175 lb (79kg)	1986-04-19	Los Angeles Sparks	1st
	G	25	(United States)	Hammon, Becky	5' 6" (1.68m)	136 lb (62kg)	1977-03-11	San Antonio Silver Stars	6th
	G	13	(United States)	Whalen, Lindsay	5' 9" (1.75m)	150 lb (68kg)	1982-05-09	Minnesota Lynx	3rd
	F	33	(United States)	Augustus, Seimone	6' 0" (1.83m)	179 lb (81kg)	1984-04-30	Minnesota Lynx	3rd
	F	32	(United States)	Brunson, Rebekkah (RS)	6' 3" (1.91m)	175 lb (79kg)	1981-12-11	Minnesota Lynx	2nd
	F	13	(Australia)	Taylor, Penny	6' 1" (1.85m)	165 lb (75kg)	1981-05-24	Phoenix Mercury	3rd
	C	11	(United States)	Adams, Danielle	6' 1" (1.85m)	239 lb (108kg)	1989-02-09	San Antonio Silver Stars	1st
	C	8	(Australia)	Cambage, Liz (IR)	6' 8" (2.03m)	215 lb (98kg)	1991-02-18	Tulsa Shock	1st

Head coach
(United States) Brian Agler (Seattle)
Assistant coaches
(United States) Jenny Boucek
(United States) Dan Hughes (San Antonio)
Athletic trainer
(United States) Tom Spencer

Legend

- (S) Starter
- (IR) Injury replacement
- (RS) Replacement for injured starter
- Injured

=== Results ===
ABC (HD)

July 23
3:30 pm EDT

Report

East 118, West 113
Scoring by quarter: 33–36, 32–30, 27–26, 26–21
Pts: Cappie Pondexter (17); Rebs: Angel McCoughtry (10); Asts: Cappie Pondexter (7)	Pts: Swin Cash (21); Rebs: Swin Cash (12); Asts: Diana Taurasi (7)

AT&T Center, San Antonio, Texas
Attendance: 12,540
Referees:
#4 Sue Blauch
#17 Scott Twardoski
#45 Tom Mauer

== The Top 15 ==
At halftime, the WNBA announced its list of the top 15 players in the 15 seasons of the league. The honorees were elected in balloting by fans, national media, and current players and coaches. Named to the team were:

- Sue Bird
- Tamika Catchings
- Cynthia Cooper-Dyke
- Yolanda Griffith
- Becky Hammon
- Lauren Jackson
- Lisa Leslie
- Ticha Penicheiro
- Cappie Pondexter
- Katie Smith
- Dawn Staley
- Sheryl Swoopes
- Diana Taurasi
- Tina Thompson
- Teresa Weatherspoon
