= 2003 WNBA All-Star Game =

Exhibition basketball game

	1	2	Total
West	38	46	84
East	46	29	75
- Date: July 12, 2003
- Arena: Madison Square Garden
- City: New York, New York
- MVP: Nikki Teasley
- Attendance: 18,610

WNBA All-Star Game
< 2002	2004 >

The 2003 WNBA All-Star Game was played on July 12, 2003 at Madison Square Garden in New York, New York, home of the New York Liberty. This is the second time New York hosted the contest after previously hosting the 1999 game. This is the 5th annual WNBA All-Star Game.

The West defeated the East, 84–75, and Nikki Teasley was named the All-Star Game MVP after recording 10 points, six rebounds and six assists.

== The All-Star Game ==
=== Rosters ===
Western Conference All-Stars
Pos.	Player	Team	Selection #
Starters
PG	(United States) Sue Bird	Seattle Storm	2nd
SG	(United States) Cynthia Cooper ^{1}	Houston Comets	3rd
SF	(United States) Sheryl Swoopes	Houston Comets	4th
PF	(United States) Tina Thompson ^{1}	Houston Comets	5th
C	(United States) Lisa Leslie	Los Angeles Sparks	5th
Reserves
PG	(United States) Nikki Teasley ^{2}	Los Angeles Sparks	1st
SG	(United States) Tamecka Dixon ^{3}	Los Angeles Sparks	3rd
SG	(United States) Marie Ferdinand ^{2}	San Antonio Silver Stars	2nd
SG	(United States) Katie Smith	Minnesota Lynx	4th
PF	(Australia) Lauren Jackson ^{3}	Seattle Storm	3rd
PF	(United States) Adrian Williams	Phoenix Mercury	1st
C	(United States) Yolanda Griffith	Sacramento Monarchs	4th
C	(Poland) Margo Dydek	San Antonio Silver Stars	1st

Eastern Conference All-Stars
Pos.	Player	Team	Selection #
Starters
PG	(United States) Teresa Weatherspoon	New York Liberty	5th
SG	(United States) Dawn Staley	Charlotte Sting	3rd
SF	(United States) Tamika Catchings	Indiana Fever	2nd
PF	(United States) Chamique Holdsclaw	Washington Mystics	5th
C	(United States) Tari Phillips	New York Liberty	4th
Reserves
PG	(United States) Becky Hammon ^{1}	New York Liberty	1st
PG	(United States) Shannon Johnson	Connecticut Sun	4th
SG	(United States) Deanna Nolan	Detroit Shock	1st
SG	(United States) Nykesha Sales ^{2}	Connecticut Sun	5th
SF	(United States) Swin Cash	Detroit Shock	1st
PF	(United States) Natalie Williams	Indiana Fever	4th
C	(United States) Cheryl Ford	Detroit Shock	1st

- ^{1} Injured
- ^{2} Injury replacement
- ^{3} Starting in place of injured player

ABC

July 12
4:00 p.m.

Western Conference 84, Eastern Conference 75
Pts: Lisa Leslie 17; Rebs: Yolanda Griffith 7 Asts: Nikki Teasley 6	Pts: Tamika Catchings 17; Rebs: Natalie Williams 11; Asts: Dawn Staley 7

Madison Square Garden, New York, New York
Attendance: 18,610

=== Coaches ===
The coach for the Western Conference was Los Angeles Sparks coach Michael Cooper. The coach for the Eastern Conference was New York Liberty coach Richie Adubato.
