= 2013 WNBA All-Star Game =

Basketball game

	1	2	3	4	Total
West	29	14	31	28	102
East	27	22	32	17	98
- Date: July 27, 2013
- Arena: Mohegan Sun Arena
- City: Uncasville, Connecticut
- MVP: Candace Parker
- Attendance: 9,323
- Network: ABC
West	East

WNBA All-Star Game
< 2011	2014 >

The 2013 WNBA All-Star Game was an exhibition basketball game that was played on July 27, 2013, at the Mohegan Sun Arena in Uncasville, CT, the current home of the Connecticut Sun. This was the 11th edition of the WNBA All-Star Game, and was played during the 2013 WNBA season. This was the third time the event had been held in Connecticut, the others being the 2005 and 2009 games.

Starters for the game were selected by fan voting. Fans were able to select three frontcourt players and two guards. Chicago Sky rookie Elena Delle Donne led voting with 35,646 votes, the first rookie ever to do so.

== Coaches ==
Coaches were determined by the previous year's conference championships. Lin Dunn, coach of the defending WNBA and East champion Indiana Fever coached the Eastern Conference, while Cheryl Reeve, coach of the defending West champion Minnesota Lynx, coached the West. It was the first time coaching the All-Star Game for both coaches.

== Players ==
=== Eastern Conference ===
In addition to Elena Delle Donne, Tamika Catchings of the Fever and Angel McCoughtry of the Atlanta Dream were voted as frontcourt starters for the East, with Epiphanny Prince of Chicago and Cappie Pondexter of the New York Liberty at guard. Delle Donne was unable to play due to a concussion, and was replaced in the starting lineup by Tina Charles of Connecticut.

Reserves included Ivory Latta and Crystal Langhorne of the Washington Mystics, Sylvia Fowles of the Chicago Sky, Allison Hightower of the Sun, Shavonte Zellous of the Fever, and Érika de Souza of the Dream, who was named to the team as an injury replacement for Delle Donne.

=== Western Conference ===
Forward Candace Parker of the Los Angeles Sparks was the top vote getter in the West, and was joined in the frontcourt by Brittney Griner of the Phoenix Mercury and Maya Moore of the Minnesota Lynx. Starting guards for the West were Seimone Augustus of the Minnesota Lynx and Diana Taurasi of the Phoenix Mercury. Griner was unable to play due to a knee injury, and was replaced in the starting lineup by Rebekkah Brunson of the Lynx.

Reserves included Lindsay Whalen of the Lynx, Kristi Toliver and Nneka Ogwumike of the Sparks, Glory Johnson of the Tulsa Shock, and Danielle Robinson of the San Antonio Silver Stars. Veteran forward Tina Thompson of the Seattle Storm was named as an injury replacement for Griner, marking her record ninth appearance in an All-Star Game.

== Rosters ==
Eastern Conference
Pos	Player	Team	No. of selections
Starters
F	Tamika Catchings	Indiana Fever	8
C	Tina Charles	Connecticut Sun	2
F	Angel McCoughtry	Atlanta Dream	2
G	Cappie Pondexter	New York Liberty	5
G	Epiphanny Prince	Chicago Sky	2
Reserves
F	Elena Delle Donne^{INJ}	Chicago Sky	1
C	Sylvia Fowles	Chicago Sky	3
G	Allison Hightower	Connecticut Sun	1
F	Crystal Langhorne	Washington Mystics	2
G	Ivory Latta	Washington Mystics	1
C	Érika de Souza	Atlanta Dream	2
G	Shavonte Zellous	Indiana Fever	1

Western Conference
Pos	Player	Team	No. of selections
Starters
G	Seimone Augustus	Minnesota Lynx	4
F	Rebekkah Brunson	Minnesota Lynx	3
F	Maya Moore	Minnesota Lynx	2
F	Candace Parker	Los Angeles Sparks	2
G	Diana Taurasi	Phoenix Mercury	6
Reserves
C	Brittney Griner^{INJ}	Phoenix Mercury	1
F	Glory Johnson	Tulsa Shock	1
F	Nneka Ogwumike	Los Angeles Sparks	1
G	Danielle Robinson	San Antonio Silver Stars	1
F	Tina Thompson	Seattle Storm	9
G	Kristi Toliver	Los Angeles Sparks	1
G	Lindsay Whalen	Minnesota Lynx	4

^INJUnable to play due to injury

=== Game ===
ABC

July 27, 2013
3:30 p.m. ET

Box score

Western Conference 102, Eastern Conference 98
Scoring by quarter: 29-27, 14–22, 31-32, 28-17
Pts: Candace Parker 23; Rebs: Brunson and Parker 11; Asts: Danielle Robinson 4	Pts: Latta and Prince 15; Rebs: McCoughtry and de Souza 8 Asts: Cappie Pondexter 5

Mohegan Sun Arena, Uncasville, Connecticut
Attendance: 9,323
Referees:
- #38 Lamont Simpson
- #24 Tony Dawkins
- #31 Amy Bonner

The West jumped out to an early lead, but saw it evaporate by halftime, and trailed by as many as 11 during the third quarter. Candace Parker then took over, finishing with an All-Star record 23 points, as the West defeated the East 102–98.
