= Tari Phillips =

American basketball player (born 1969)

Personal information
- Born: March 6, 1969 (age 57) Orlando, Florida, U.S.
- Listed height: 6 ft 1 in (1.85 m)
- Listed weight: 200 lb (91 kg)

Career information
- High school: Edgewater (Orlando, Florida)
- College: Georgia (1987–1990); UCF (1990–1991)
- WNBA draft: 1999: 1st round, 8th overall pick
- Drafted by: Orlando Miracle
- Playing career: 1999–2007
- Position: Forward / center
- Number: 24

Career history
- 1999: Orlando Miracle
- 2000–2004: New York Liberty
- 2005–2007: Houston Comets

Career highlights
- 4× WNBA All-Star (2000–2003); All-WNBA Second Team (2002); WNBA Most Improved Player (2000)
- Stats at Basketball Reference
Medals
Women's basketball
Representing United States
World University Games
Bronze medal – third place	1993 Buffalo	Team competition
FIBA World Championship for Women
Gold medal – first place	2002 Nanjing	Team Competition

Tari Lynne Phillips (born March 6, 1969) is an American former professional women's basketball player. Her cousin Tayyiba Haneef-Park played for USA Volleyball.

Born in Orlando, Florida, Phillips attended the University of Georgia during her first three college years, and helped its Lady Bulldogs team to the NCAA Regional Finals in 1987 and 1988. She transferred during her senior year to the University of Central Florida, where she graduated in 1991.

== Professional career ==
=== ABL ===
She played for the Seattle Reign and the Colorado Xplosion in the American Basketball League (1996-1998). She made the ABL's Western Conference All-Star team in both 1997 and 1998, and was named the MVP of the 1997 All-Star Game.

=== WNBA ===
After the ABL abruptly folded, Phillip was selected by her hometown team, the Orlando Miracle in the first round (eighth overall) of the WNBA draft on May 4, 1999.

After her WNBA rookie season in 1999, she was selected by the Portland Fire in the 2000 expansion draft, but she was later traded to the New York Liberty just prior to the start of the 2000 WNBA season. She played with the Liberty from 2000 to 2004.

After the 2004 season ended, she became an unrestricted free agent and signed with the Houston Comets for the 2005 WNBA season. The Comets waived Phillips on July 2, 2007.

== USA Basketball ==
Phillips was named to the USA team for the 1993 World University Games competition in Buffalo, New York. The team had a 6–2 record and won the bronze medal. Phillips was the leading scorer in several games including 25 points against Japan and 23 against China. Phillips was the overall leading scorer for the team, averaging 18.8 points per game and led the team in rebounding with 11.0 per game.

Phillips was selected to represent the US at the 1995 USA Women's Pan American Games, however, only four teams committed to participate, so the event was cancelled.

In 2002, Phillips was named to the national team as a replacement for the injured Tina Thompson which competed in the World Championships in Zhangjiagang, Changzhou and Nanjing, China. The team was coached by Van Chancellor. Phillips scored 3.3 points per game. The USA team won all nine games, including a close title game against Russia, which was a one-point game late in the game.

== Career statistics ==
Legend
GP	Games played	GS	Games started	MPG	Minutes per game	RPG	Rebounds per game
APG	Assists per game	SPG	Steals per game	BPG	Blocks per game	PPG	Points per game
TO	Turnovers per game	FG%	Field-goal percentage	3P%	3-point field-goal percentage	FT%	Free-throw percentage
**Bold**	Career best	°	League leader

=== WNBA ===
==== Regular season ====
WNBA regular season statistics
Year	Team	GP	GS	MPG	FG%	3P%	FT%	RPG	APG	SPG	BPG	TO	PPG
1999	Orlando	32	0	10.5	40.6	0.0	48.1	2.1	0.3	0.6	0.3	1.5	4.1
2000	New York	31	30	31.5	46.7	**25.0**	65.4	8.0	0.9	**1.9**	0.7	2.7	13.8
2001	New York	32	**32**	**32.8**	**50.7**	0.0	58.4	8.0	1.1	1.5	0.5	2.6	**15.3**
2002	New York	32	31	31.5	49.1	0.0	67.5	7.0	1.3	1.8	0.4	2.9	14.1
2003	New York	**33**	**32**	31.3	39.7	20.0	64.9	**8.5**	**1.7**	1.7	**0.8**	2.8	11.3
2004	New York	13	13	23.9	34.7	0.0	45.7	5.4	1.2	1.1	**0.8**	2.5	6.7
2005	Houston	32	1	11.4	42.6	0.0	64.6	2.5	0.4	0.3	0.3	0.9	3.5
2006	Houston	21	2	10.6	38.5	0.0	65.5	2.2	0.2	0.4	0.2	1.1	2.8
2007	Houston	6	0	5.8	30.0	0.0	**100.0**	0.8	0.2	0.5	0.0	**0.8**	1.7
**Career**	9 years, 3 teams	232	141	23.0	45.2	13.6	61.9	5.5	0.9	1.2	0.5	2.1	9.2

==== Playoffs ====
WNBA playoff statistics
Year	Team	GP	GS	MPG	FG%	3P%	FT%	RPG	APG	SPG	BPG	TO	PPG
2000	New York	7	7	31.7	**50.5**	0.0	**78.3**	7.6	1.1	**1.7**	0.9	2.3	**16.3**
2001	New York	6	6	**33.7**	41.9	0.0	47.1	**8.2**	**1.7**	1.5	**1.0**	2.8	11.3
2002	New York	**8**	**8**	31.1	49.5	0.0	71.4	5.9	1.3	1.1	0.5	2.4	14.4
2005	Houston	5	0	10.6	41.7	0.0	75.0	1.8	0.2	0.2	0.0	**0.8**	2.6
**Career**	4 years, 2 teams	26	21	27.9	47.7	0.0	64.6	6.1	1.1	1.2	0.6	2.2	11.9

=== College ===
College statistics
Year	Team	GP	GS	MPG	FG%	3P%	FT%	RPG	APG	SPG	BPG	TO	PPG
1987–88	Georgia	**31**	-	-	45.9	16.7	**62.4**	4.3	**1.1**	1.2	0.4	-	9.0
1988–89	Georgia	2	-	-	**75.0**	0.0	0.0	0.5	0.0	0.0	0.0	-	3.0
1989–90	UCF	Did not play due to injury											
1990–91	UCF	21	-	-	51.7	**37.1**	61.6	**12.4**	**1.1**	**2.2**	**1.3**	-	**25.3**°
**Career**		54	-	-	49.7	34.1	61.9	7.3	1.1	1.6	0.7	-	15.1
