= LaChina Robinson =

Basketball analyst

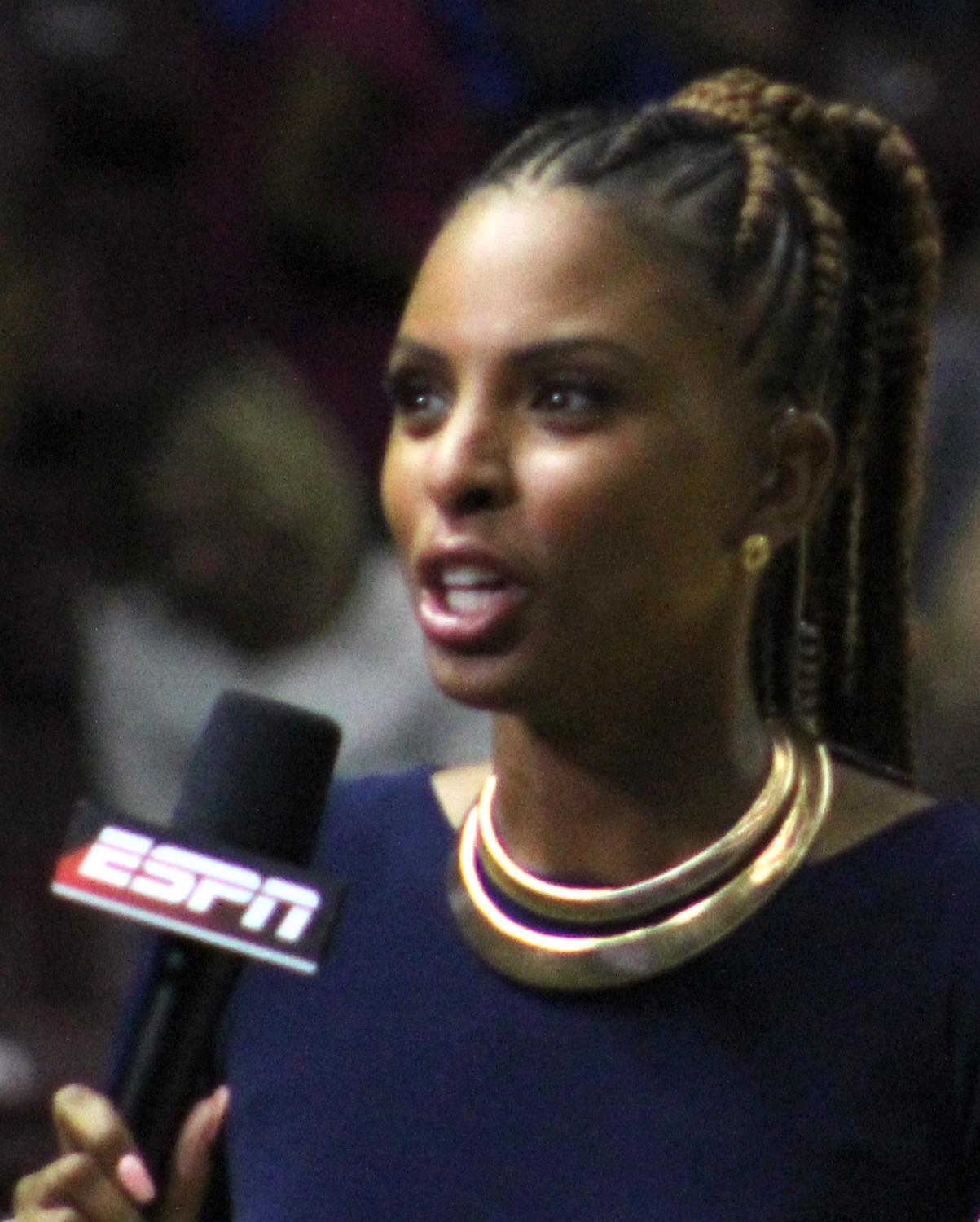
Robinson at the 2017 WNBA Semifinals

LaChina Robinson is a basketball analyst who calls college basketball games for NBC Sports, Prime Video, ESPN, Fox Sports 1, and FS South. She is also the analyst for the Atlanta Dream of the WNBA and calls select WNBA games for NBC, ESPN and NBATV.

== Early life ==
A native of Alexandria, Virginia, Robinson grew up one of sixteen children in a blended family. Until age 14 she participated in cheerleading, only starting basketball as a high school freshman. She reached a height of 6'4" by her mid teens, and she cites basketball as opening up her eyes to new opportunities that enabled her to use her height as a gift.

Robinson became a member of the Amateur Athletic Union in high school. She earned her a scholarship to Wake Forest University where she played for four seasons. Over her four-year career Robinson played in 112 games, and started in 95. Robinson went on to rank third in school history with blocks (77) and 15th in rebounds (475).

== Broadcasting ==
After playing her four years of college, Robinson joined the Atlantic Coast Conference administration offices for one full season before heading to Georgia Institute of Technology where she served as a special assistant to the head coach, director of operations and administrative assistant in charge of recruiting. Georgia Tech then hired her as an analyst on their radio broadcasts.

In 2009 Robinson was hired by ESPN. 2010 was her first full season of serving as an analyst for ESPN and Fox Sports South. Robinson was awarded the 2021 Mel Greenberg Media Award by the Women's Basketball Coaches Association.
