= 2002 WNBA All-Star Game =

Exhibition basketball game

	1	2	Total
West	40	41	81
East	40	36	76
- Date: July 15, 2002
- Arena: MCI Center
- City: Washington D.C.
- MVP: Lisa Leslie
- Attendance: 19,487

WNBA All-Star Game
< 2001	2003 >

The 2002 WNBA All-Star Game was played on July 15, 2002 at MCI Center in Washington, D.C. This was the 4th annual WNBA All-Star Game. The West defeated the East, 81–76, and Lisa Leslie was named the All-Star Game MVP after recording 18 points and 14 rebounds.

== The All-Star Game ==
=== Rosters ===
Western Conference All-Stars
Pos.	Player	Team	Selection #
Starters
G	(Portugal) Ticha Penicheiro	Sacramento Monarchs	4th
G	(United States) Sue Bird	Seattle Storm	1st
F	(United States) Sheryl Swoopes	Houston Comets	3rd
F	(United States) Tina Thompson	Houston Comets	4th
C	(United States) Lisa Leslie	Los Angeles Sparks	4th
Reserves
G	(United States) Tamecka Dixon	Los Angeles Sparks	2nd
G	(United States) Marie Ferdinand	Utah Starzz	1st
G	(United States) Adrienne Goodson	Utah Starzz	1st
G	(Democratic Republic of the Congo) Mwadi Mabika	Los Angeles Sparks	2nd
F	(United States) Katie Smith	Minnesota Lynx	3rd
F	(Australia) Lauren Jackson	Seattle Storm	2nd

Eastern Conference All-Stars
Pos.	Player	Team	Selection #
Starters
G	(United States) Teresa Weatherspoon	New York Liberty	4th
G	(United States) Dawn Staley	Charlotte Sting	2nd
F	(United States) Tamika Catchings	Indiana Fever	1st
F	(United States) Chamique Holdsclaw ^{1}	Washington Mystics	4th
C	(United States) Tari Phillips	New York Liberty	3rd
Reserves
G	(Canada) Stacey Dales-Schuman ^{2}	Washington Mystics	1st
G	(United States) Shannon Johnson	Orlando Miracle	3rd
G	(United States) Nykesha Sales	Orlando Miracle	4th
G	(United States) Sheri Sam	Miami Sol	1st
G	(United States) Andrea Stinson ^{3}	Charlotte Sting	3rd
F	(Australia) Penny Taylor	Cleveland Rockers	1st
C	(Canada) Tammy Sutton-Brown	Charlotte Sting	1st

- ^{1} Injured
- ^{2} Injury replacement
- ^{3} Starting in place of injured player

ESPN

July 15
7:30 p.m.

Western Conference 81, Eastern Conference 76
Pts: Tina Thompson 20; Rebs: Lisa Leslie 14; Asts: Sue Bird 7	Pts: Tamika Catchings 12; Rebs: Tari Phillips 10; Asts: Dawn Staley 5

MCI Center, Washington D.C.
Attendance: 19,487
Referees:
1. 10 Bob Trammell, #20 Teresa Dahlem, #19 Tony Brown

=== Coaches ===
The coach for the Western Conference was Los Angeles Sparks coach Michael Cooper. The coach for the Eastern Conference was Charlotte Sting coach Anne Donovan.
