= Danielle Robinson =

American basketball player (born 1989)

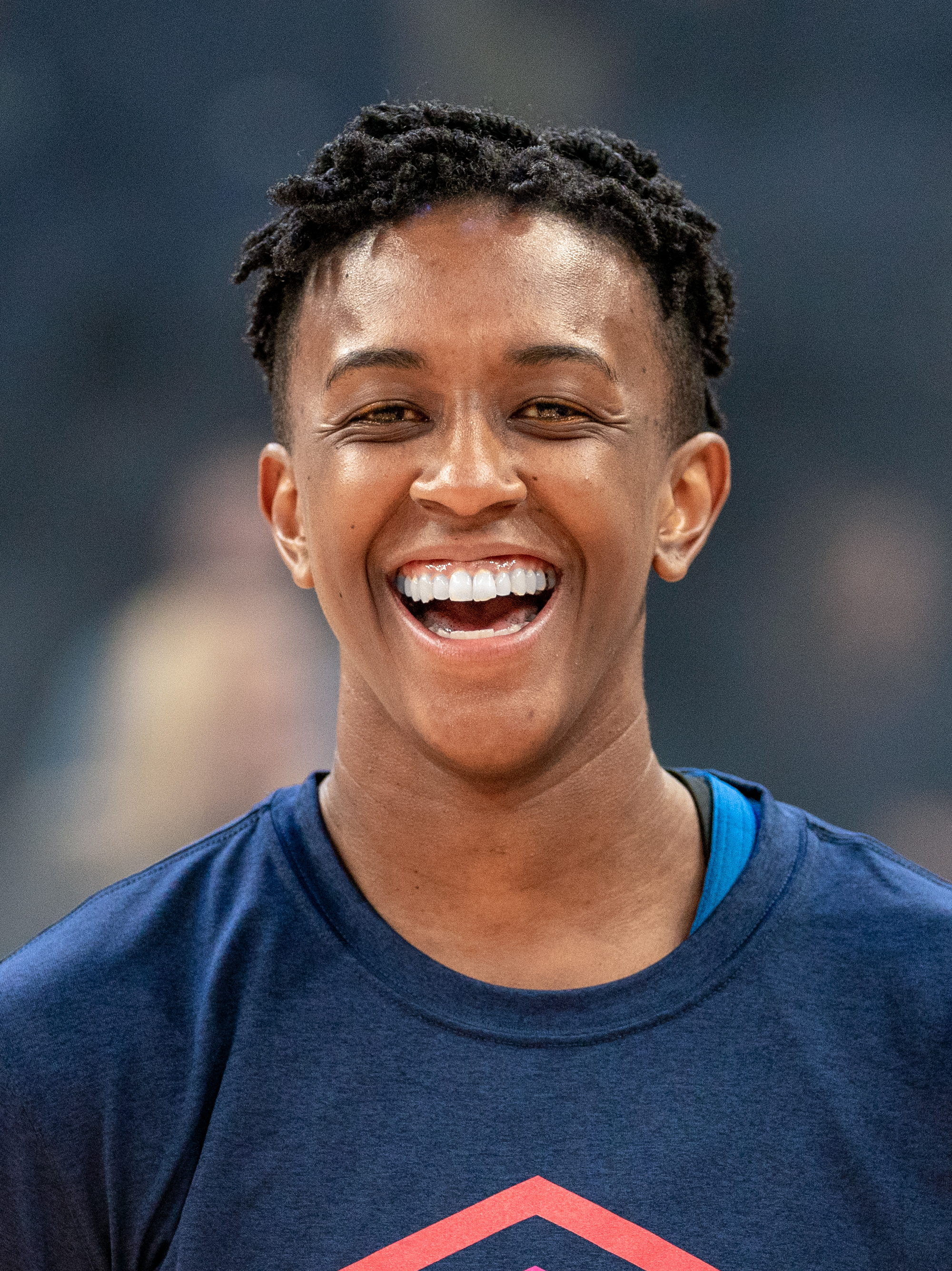
- Robinson in 2019

Personal information
- Born: May 10, 1989 (age 37) San Jose, California, U.S.
- Listed height: 5 ft 9 in (1.75 m)
- Listed weight: 137 lb (62 kg)

Career information
- High school: Archbishop Mitty (San Jose, California)
- College: Oklahoma (2007–2011)
- WNBA draft: 2011: 1st round, 6th overall pick
- Drafted by: San Antonio Silver Stars
- Playing career: 2011–2024
- Position: Point guard

Career history

Playing
- 2011–2016: San Antonio Stars
- 2012–2013: Tarsus Belediye
- 2013–2016: ZVVZ USK Prague
- 2016–2017: Mersin Büyükşehir Belediyesi S.K.
- 2017: Phoenix Mercury
- 2018–2019: Minnesota Lynx
- 2020: Las Vegas Aces
- 2021–2022: Indiana Fever
- 2023: Atlanta Dream

Coaching
- 2025: Los Angeles Sparks (assistant)

Career highlights
- 3× WNBA All-Star (2013–2015); All-WNBA Second Team (2014); 3× WNBA All-Defensive Second Team (2012–2014); WNBA assists leader (2013); WNBA peak performer (2013); WNBA All-Rookie Team (2011); EuroLeague champion (2015); Second-team All-American – AP (2011); Third-team All-American – AP (2010); State Farm Coaches' All-American (2010); 3× First-team All-Big 12 (2009–2011); 4× Big 12 All-Defensive Team (2008–2011); Big 12 Freshman of the Year (2008); Big 12 All-Freshman Team (2008)
- Stats at WNBA.com
- Stats at Basketball Reference
Medals
Women's basketball
Representing United States
World University Games
Gold medal – first place	2009 Belgrade	Team

Danielle Robinson (born May 10, 1989) is an American basketball executive, coach and former professional player who was most recently an assistant coach for the Los Angeles Sparks of the Women's National Basketball Association (WNBA). She played college basketball at Oklahoma. She was selected sixth overall in the 2011 WNBA draft by the San Antonio Silver Stars. She played for 12 seasons in the WNBA with the Silver Stars (later known as the Stars, and since 2018, the Las Vegas Aces), Atlanta Dream, Indiana Fever, Minnesota Lynx, and Phoenix Mercury.

== College statistics ==
Legend
GP	Games played	GS	Games started	MPG	Minutes per game
FG%	Field goal percentage	3P%	3-point field goal percentage	FT%	Free throw percentage
RPG	Rebounds per game	APG	Assists per game	SPG	Steals per game
BPG	Blocks per game	PPG	Points per game	**Bold**	Career high

Year	Team	GP	Points	FG%	3P%	FT%	RPG	APG	SPG	BPG	PPG
2007–08	Oklahoma	31	378	48.0	-	68.7	2.9	4.2	2.2	0.1	12.2
2008–09	Oklahoma	37	479	**55.6**	-	**90.2**	2.9	**5.9**	2.2	0.1	12.9
2009–10	Oklahoma	**38**	639	46.5	13.3	87.7	3.3	5.3	1.9	0.1	16.8
2010–11	Oklahoma	35	**642**	45.8	**27.8**	87.9	**3.7**	5.1	**2.5**	0.1	**18.3**
Career	Oklahoma	141	2138	48.3	19.4	85.2	3.2	5.1	2.2	0.1	15.2

== USA Basketball ==
Robinson was named a member of the team representing the US at the 2009 World University Games held in Belgrade, Serbia. The team won all seven games to earn the gold medal. Robinson averaged 4.6 points per game.

== Professional career ==
=== WNBA ===
Robinson was selected the first round of the 2011 WNBA draft (6th overall) by the San Antonio Silver Stars.

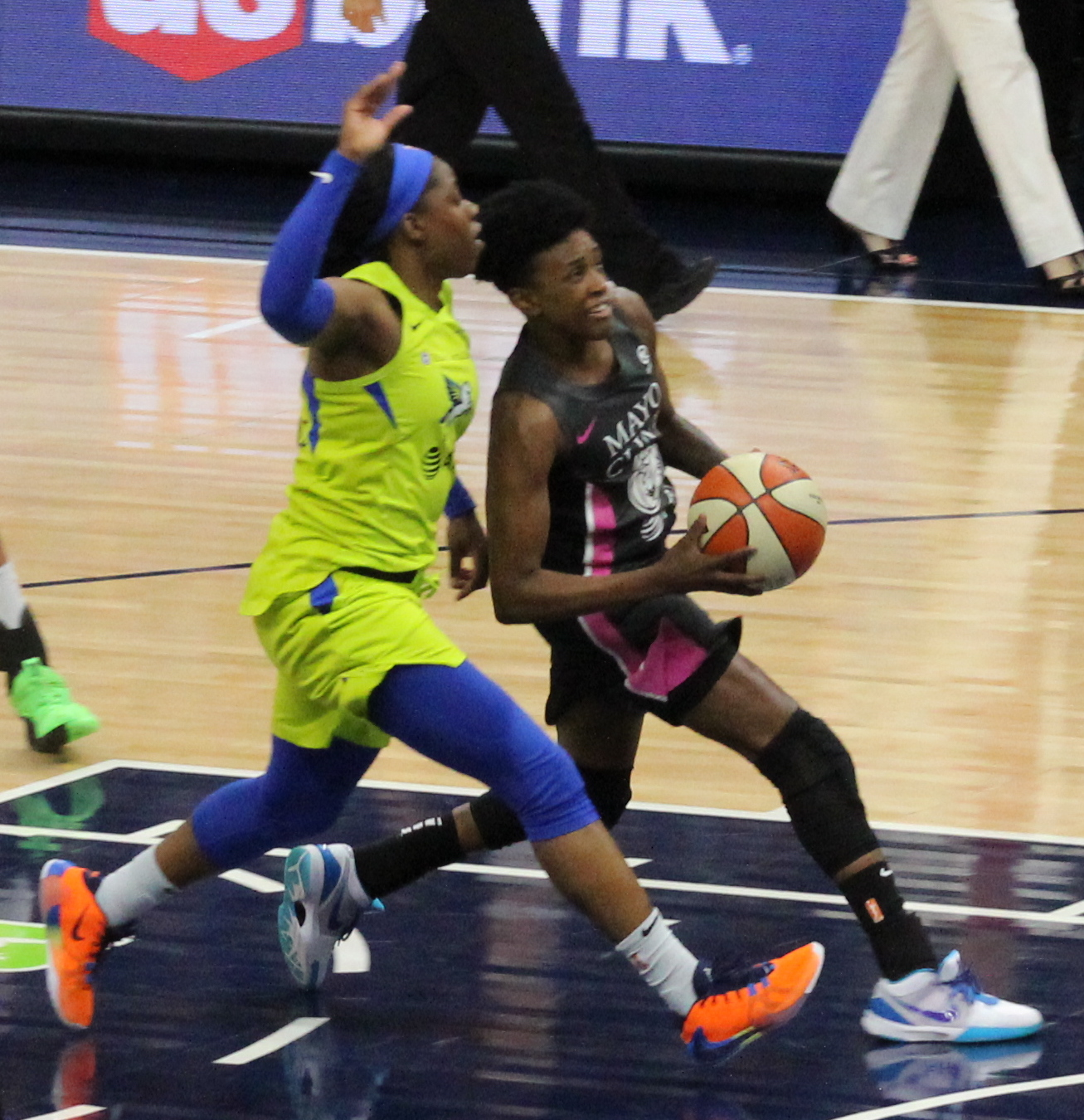
Robinson scoring against Arike Ogunbowale

Robinson quickly established herself as perhaps the quickest athlete in the WNBA. Robinson made the Western Conference All-Star Team in her third season in the league, and led the league in assists per game, earning the WNBA Peak Performer award for assists.

In 2015, Robinson re-signed with San Antonio in free agency.

In 2016, Robinson was sidelined for the whole season due to an achilles injury.

In 2017, Robinson was traded to the Phoenix Mercury in exchange for Isabelle Harrison and a 2017 first round pick.

On March 6, 2018, Robinson was traded along with a 2nd round pick in 2019, to the Minnesota Lynx, for the 12th pick in the 2018 WNBA draft.

After spending two seasons with the Indiana Fever, Robinson was traded on January 13, 2023, to the Atlanta Dream in exchange for Kristy Wallace.

On January 1, 2025, Robinson announced her retirement from professional basketball.

=== Europe ===
Robinson began her European career with Tarsus Belediye in Mersin, Turkey. She played for the team during the 2012–13 season in both the Turkish Women's Basketball League and the EuroLeague Women. The following year, she joined ZVVZ USK Prague. She came to the team late in the 2013–14 season, but helped them to the Final Eight in that year's EuroLeague Women. She returned to ZVVZ USK Prague for the 2014-15 season. She helped take the team to its first EuroLeague title, scoring 24 points on 11-of-19 shooting in the Final against the heavily favored UMMC Ekaterinburg.

== Executive and coaching career ==
On January 2, 2025, just one day after announcing her retirement from professional basketball, Robinson was named the Manager of Basketball Integration and Scout Support for the Los Angeles Sparks. On April 24, The Sparks announced her promotion to assistant coach, a role she would hold in addition to her other responsibilities.

== WNBA career statistics ==
Legend
GP	Games played	GS	Games started	MPG	Minutes per game	RPG	Rebounds per game
APG	Assists per game	SPG	Steals per game	BPG	Blocks per game	PPG	Points per game
TO	Turnovers per game	FG%	Field-goal percentage	3P%	3-point field-goal percentage	FT%	Free-throw percentage
**Bold**	Career best	°	League leader

=== Regular season ===
Year	Team	GP	GS	MPG	FG%	3P%	FT%	RPG	APG	SPG	BPG	TO	PPG
2011	San Antonio	**34**	9	23.1	.460	.000	.903	2.3	3.9	0.8	0.1	1.8	8.2
2012	San Antonio	**34**	**34**	28.9	**.541**	.000	.782	2.5	4.3	1.4	0.1	1.6	9.9
2013	San Antonio	25	25	32.5	.444	.000	.797	3.1	**6.7**	1.4	**0.2**	2.6	11.2
2014	San Antonio	33	33	**33.1**	.457	.000	**.941**	**3.5**	5.3	**1.7**	**0.2**	2.4	**12.9**
2015	San Antonio	30	30	30.1	.390	.000	.903	2.5	5.0	0.7	0.1	2.6	9.2
2017	Phoenix	32	29	23.5	.432	.000	.846	2.9	3.4	1.1	**0.2**	1.9	6.9
2018	Minnesota	28	2	18.6	.445	.158	.854	1.8	3.3	0.9	0.0	1.8	6.5
2019	Minnesota	**34**	25	27.0	.437	.220	.879	**3.5**	3.7	1.2	**0.2**	2.1	10.1
2020	Las Vegas	22	1	22.4	.512	**.385**	.810	2.4	3.2	0.9	0.1	**1.3**	7.4
2021	Indiana	24	24	27.5	.417	.200	.889	**3.5**	3.7	1.6	0.1	1.8	9.9
2022	Indiana	31	30	23.6	.419	.225	.850	2.9	3.8	0.7	**0.2**	1.6	7.4
2023	Atlanta	32	27	21.6	.461	.290	.750	2.2	3.3	0.7	0.1	**1.3**	5.8
Career	12 years, 5 teams	359	269	26.0	.450	.198	.861	2.8	4.1	1.1	0.1	1.9	8.8

=== Postseason ===
Year	Team	GP	GS	MPG	FG%	3P%	FT%	RPG	APG	SPG	BPG	TO	PPG
2011	San Antonio	3	3	30.0	.259	.000	**1.000**	3.0	2.3	**1.7**	0.0	2.0	5.3
2012	San Antonio	2	2	**32.5**	**.450**	.000	**1.000**	4.0	4.5	0.5	0.0	1.5	**12.0**
2014	San Antonio	2	2	30.5	.364	.000	.750	3.5	**6.0**	0.5	**0.5**	3.5	9.5
2017	Phoenix	5	0	10.6	.429	.000	**1.000**	0.8	1.0	0.2	0.0	**0.6**	2.8
2019	Minnesota	1	1	19.0	.000	.000	.000	4.0	3.0	0.0	0.0	2.0	0.0
2020	Las Vegas	**8**	**7**	29.9	.397	**.333**	.727	**4.4**	3.9	1.3	0.0	1.5	9.1
2023	Atlanta	2	2	22.0	.200	.000	.750	1.5	4.0	1.0	0.0	2.0	2.5
Career	7 years, 4 teams	23	17	24.8	.365	.231	.800	3.0	3.3	0.9	0.0	1.6	6.6

== See also ==
- List of WNBA career assists leaders
