= 2000 WNBA All-Star Game =

Exhibition basketball game

	1	2	Total
East	33	28	61
West	40	33	73
- Date: July 17, 2000
- Arena: America West Arena
- City: Phoenix, Arizona
- MVP: Tina Thompson
- Attendance: 17,717

WNBA All-Star Game
< 1999	2001 >

The 2000 WNBA All-Star Game was played on July 17, 2000, at America West Arena in Phoenix, Arizona. This was the 2nd annual WNBA All-Star Game.

The West defeated the East, 73–61, and Tina Thompson was named the All-Star Game MVP after recording 13 points and 11 rebounds.

== The All-Star Game ==
=== Rosters ===
Eastern Conference All-Stars
Pos.	Player	Team	Selection #
Starters
G	(United States) Teresa Weatherspoon	New York Liberty	2nd
G	(United States) Nikki McCray	Washington Mystics	2nd
F	(United States) Chamique Holdsclaw	Washington Mystics	2nd
F	(United States) Sue Wicks	New York Liberty	1st
F	(United States) Taj McWilliams	Orlando Miracle	2nd
Reserves
G	(United States) Shannon Johnson	Orlando Miracle	2nd
G	(United States) Merlakia Jones	Cleveland Rockers	2nd
G	(United States) Nykesha Sales	Orlando Miracle	2nd
G	(United States) Andrea Stinson	Charlotte Sting	1st
F	(United States) Wendy Palmer	Detroit Shock	1st
C	(United States) Tari Phillips	New York Liberty	1st

Western Conference All-Stars
Pos.	Player	Team	Selection #
Starters
G	(Portugal) Ticha Penicheiro	Sacramento Monarchs	2nd
G	(United States) Cynthia Cooper ^{1}	Houston Comets	2nd
F	(United States) Sheryl Swoopes	Houston Comets	2nd
F	(United States) Tina Thompson	Houston Comets	2nd
C	(United States) Lisa Leslie	Los Angeles Sparks	2nd
Reserves
G	(United States) Betty Lennox	Minnesota Lynx	1st
G	(Democratic Republic of the Congo) Mwadi Mabika	Los Angeles Sparks	1st
F	(United States) Delisha Milton	Los Angeles Sparks	1st
F	(United States) Brandy Reed	Phoenix Mercury	1st
F	(United States) Katie Smith ^{2}	Minnesota Lynx	1st
F	(United States) Natalie Williams	Utah Starzz	2nd
C	(United States) Yolanda Griffith	Sacramento Monarchs	2nd

- ^{1} Injured
- ^{2} Starting in place of injured player

NBC

July 17
7:00 p.m.

Eastern Conference 61, Western Conference 73
Pts: Phillips, McWilliams 10; Rebs: Phillips, McWilliams 9 Asts: Teresa Weatherspoon 3	Pts: Lisa Leslie 16; Rebs: Tina Thompson 11; Asts: Ticha Penicheiro 4

America West Arena, Phoenix, Arizona
Attendance: 17,717
Referees: Barb Smith, Lisa Mattingly, Bill Stokes

=== Coaches ===
The coach for the Western Conference was Houston Comets coach Van Chancellor. The coach for the Eastern Conference was New York Liberty coach Richie Adubato.
