= 1999 WNBA All-Star Game =

Exhibition basketball game

	1	2	Total
West	43	36	79
East	29	32	61
- Date: July 14, 1999
- Arena: Madison Square Garden
- City: New York City
- MVP: Lisa Leslie
- Attendance: 18,649

WNBA All-Star Game
	2000 >

The 1999 WNBA All-Star Game was played on July 14, 1999, at Madison Square Garden in New York City. Even though the WNBA began in 1997, this was the inaugural All-Star Game.

== The All-Star Game ==
=== Rosters ===
Western Conference All-Stars
Pos.	Player	Team	Selection #
Starters
G	(Australia) Michelle Timms	Phoenix Mercury	1st
G	(United States) Cynthia Cooper	Houston Comets	1st
F	(United States) Sheryl Swoopes	Houston Comets	1st
F	(United States) Tina Thompson	Houston Comets	1st
C	(United States) Lisa Leslie	Los Angeles Sparks	1st
Reserves
G	(United States) Tonya Edwards	Minnesota Lynx	1st
G	(Portugal) Ticha Penicheiro	Sacramento Monarchs	1st
F	(United States) Ruthie Bolton-Holifield	Sacramento Monarchs	1st
F	(United States) Jennifer Gillom	Phoenix Mercury	1st
F	(United States) Natalie Williams	Utah Starzz	1st
C	(United States) Yolanda Griffith	Sacramento Monarchs	1st

Eastern Conference All-Stars
Pos.	Player	Team	Selection #
Starters
G	(United States) Teresa Weatherspoon	New York Liberty	1st
G	(United States) Nikki McCray	Washington Mystics	1st
F	(United States) Chamique Holdsclaw	Washington Mystics	1st
F	(United States) Vicky Bullett	Charlotte Sting	1st
C	(United States) Kym Hampton	New York Liberty	1st
Reserves
G	(United States) Shannon Johnson	Orlando Miracle	1st
G	(Australia) Sandy Brondello	Detroit Shock	1st
G	(United States) Merlakia Jones	Cleveland Rockers	1st
G	(United States) Nykesha Sales	Orlando Miracle	1st
F	(United States) Vickie Johnson ^{2}	New York Liberty	1st
F	(United States) Taj McWilliams	Orlando Miracle	1st
C	(United States) Rebecca Lobo ^{1}	New York Liberty	1st

- ^{1} Injured
- ^{2} Injury Replacement

ESPN

July 14
7:00 p.m.

Western Conference 79, Eastern Conference 61
Pts: Natalie Williams 14; Rebs: Swoopes, Williams 8 Asts: Cooper, Timms 4	Pts: Brondello, S. Johnson, McWilliams 8 Rebs: Taj McWilliams 7 Asts: Teresa Weatherspoon 4

Madison Square Garden, New York, New York
Attendance: 18,649
Referees: Sally Bell, Patty Broderick, June Corteau

=== Coaches ===
The coach for the Western Conference was Houston Comets coach Van Chancellor. The coach for the Eastern Conference was Cleveland Rockers coach Linda Hill-MacDonald.
