= 2009 WNBA All-Star Game =

Exhibition basketball game

	1	2	3	4	Total
West	25	38	36	31	130
East	27	33	33	25	118
- Date: July 25, 2009
- Arena: Mohegan Sun Arena
- City: Uncasville, Connecticut
- MVP: Swin Cash
- Attendance: 9,518

WNBA All-Star Game
< 2007	2010 >

The 2009 WNBA All-Star Game was played on July 25, 2009 at Mohegan Sun Arena in Uncasville, Connecticut, home of the Connecticut Sun. The game was the 9th annual WNBA All-Star Game. This was the second time Connecticut had hosted the basketball showcase, after previously hosting the 2005 game.

== The All-Star Game ==
=== Rosters ===
Western Conference All-Stars
Pos.	Player	Team	Selection #
Starters
PG	(United States) Sue Bird	Seattle Storm	6th
SG	(United States) Becky Hammon	San Antonio Silver Stars	5th
SF	(United States) Swin Cash	Seattle Storm	3rd
PF	(Australia) Lauren Jackson	Seattle Storm	7th
C	(United States) Lisa Leslie^{1}	Los Angeles Sparks	8th
Reserves
G	(United States) Diana Taurasi	Phoenix Mercury	4th
G	(United States) Cappie Pondexter	Phoenix Mercury	3rd
F	(United States) Charde Houston	Minnesota Lynx	1st
F	(United States) Nicole Powell^{2}	Sacramento Monarchs	1st
F	(United States) Tina Thompson^{3}	Los Angeles Sparks	8th
F	(Saint Vincent and the Grenadines) Sophia Young	San Antonio Silver Stars	3rd
C	(United States) Nicky Anosike	Minnesota Lynx	1st

Eastern Conference All Stars
Pos.	Player	Team	Selection #
Starters
PG	(United States) Alana Beard	Washington Mystics	4th
SG	(United States) Katie Douglas	Indiana Fever	3rd
SF	(United States) Tamika Catchings	Indiana Fever	6th
PF	(United States) Candice Dupree	Chicago Sky	3rd
C	(United States) Sylvia Fowles	Chicago Sky	1st
Reserves
G	(United States) Jia Perkins	Chicago Sky	1st
G	(United States) Katie Smith	Detroit Shock	7th
F	(United States) Shameka Christon	New York Liberty	1st
F	(United States) Asjha Jones	Connecticut Sun	2nd
F	(Saint Vincent and the Grenadines) Sancho Lyttle	Atlanta Dream	1st
C	(Brazil) Érika de Souza	Atlanta Dream	1st

- ^{1} Injured
- ^{2} Injury replacement
- ^{3} Starting in place of injured player

ABC (HD)

July 25
3:30 p.m.

Western Conference 130, Eastern Conference 118
Scoring by quarter: 25-27, 38-33, 36-33, 31-25
Pts: Swin Cash (22); Rebs: Cappie Pondexter (9); Asts: Sue Bird (10)	Pts: Sylvia Fowles (17); Rebs: Érika de Souza (9); Asts: Asjha Jones (6)

Mohegan Sun Arena, Uncasville, Connecticut
Attendance: 9,518
Referees:
1. 44 Felicia Grinter, #42 Roy Gulbeyan, #53 Jeff Smith

=== Coaches ===
The coach for the Western Conference all-stars was San Antonio Silver Stars coach Dan Hughes. The coach for the Eastern Conference was Indiana Fever coach Lin Dunn.

== Other events ==
=== Three-Point Shootout ===
Position	Player	From	Year to ASG			1st	2nd
Position	Player	From	Made	Attempted	Percent	1st	2nd
PG	(United States) Becky Hammon	San Antonio Silver Stars	28	86	.326	14	16
PG	(United States) Sue Bird	Seattle Storm	29	77	.377	11	12
SF	(United States) Katie Smith	Detroit Shock	32	77	.416	12	12
SF	(United States) Shameka Christon	New York Liberty	42	88	.477	10	DNQ
SG	(United States) Katie Douglas	Indiana Fever	31	86	.360	9	DNQ
SF	(United States) Diana Taurasi	Phoenix Mercury	46	105	.438	9	DNQ

=== Skills Challenge ===
Team	Player	From	Height	Weight	Time
West 1	(United States) Cappie Pondexter	Phoenix Mercury	5-9	160	34.8
West 1	(Saint Vincent and the Grenadines) Sophia Young	San Antonio Silver Stars	6-1	165	34.8
West 1	(United States) Charde Houston	Minnesota Lynx	6-1	189	34.8
East 1	(United States) Jia Perkins	Chicago Sky	5-8	155	35.4
East 1	(United States) Tamika Catchings	Indiana Fever	6-1	167	35.4
East 1	(Spain) Sancho Lyttle	Atlanta Dream	6-4	143	35.4
West 2	(United States) Swin Cash	Seattle Storm	6-1	162	43.0
West 2	(United States) Nicole Powell	Sacramento Monarchs	6-2	175	43.0
West 2	(United States) Nicky Anosike	Minnesota Lynx	6-4	211	43.0
East 2	(United States) Alana Beard	Washington Mystics	5-11	160	DQ
East 2	(United States) Asjha Jones	Connecticut Sun	6-2	198	DQ
East 2	(United States) Sylvia Fowles	Chicago Sky	6-6	200	DQ
