= 2003 WNBA dispersal draft =

General information
- Sport: Basketball
- Date: April 24, 2003

Overview
- League: WNBA
- Merging teams: Miami Sol (folded in 2002); Portland Fire (folded in 2002)
- First selection: Ruth Riley; Detroit Shock

The Women's National Basketball Association (WNBA) held its first dispersal draft on April 24, 2003 prior to the 2003 WNBA season.

This dispersal draft consisted of one round to re-assign the 26 players from the Miami Sol and Portland Fire rosters, who both folded after the end of 2002 WNBA season. The remaining fourteen teams in the WNBA each selected one player from either roster in the draft. Former Sol and Fire players not selected in the dispersal draft became unrestricted free agents. The order of selection was determined by teams' 2002 regular season records, going from worst to first.

== Key ==
Pos.	G	F	C
Position	Guard	Forward	Center

^	Denotes player who has been inducted to the Women's Basketball Hall of Fame
*	Denotes player who has been selected for at least one All-Star Game and All-WNBA Team
^{+}	Denotes player who has been selected for at least one All-Star Game

== Dispersal draft ==
Pick	Player	Position	Nationality	New team	Former team
1	Ruth Riley ^{+} ^	C	United States	Detroit Shock	Miami Sol
2	Sheri Sam ^{+}	F/G	United States	Minnesota Lynx	Miami Sol
3	Betty Lennox *	G	United States	Cleveland Rockers	Miami Sol
4	Tamicha Jackson	G	United States	Phoenix Mercury	Portland Fire
5	DeMya Walker ^{+}	F	United States	Sacramento Monarchs	Portland Fire
6	Debbie Black	G	United States	Connecticut Sun	Miami Sol
7	Sylvia Crawley	C	United States	Indiana Fever	Portland Fire
8	Jenny Mowe	C	United States	Washington Mystics	Portland Fire
9	Alisa Burras	F	United States	Seattle Storm	Portland Fire
10	Pollyanna Johns Kimbrough	C	United States	Charlotte Sting	Miami Sol
11	Elena Baranova ^{+}	F	Russia	New York Liberty	Miami Sol
12	LaQuanda Barksdale	G/F	United States	San Antonio Silver Stars	Portland Fire
13	Ukari Figgs	G	United States	Houston Comets	Portland Fire
14	Jackie Stiles ^{+} ^	G	United States	Los Angeles Sparks	Portland Fire
