= Alisa Burras =

American basketball player (born 1975)

Personal information
- Born: June 23, 1975 (age 51) Chicago, Illinois, U.S.
- Listed height: 6 ft 3 in (1.91 m)
- Listed weight: 218 lb (99 kg)

Career information
- High school: John Marshall (Chicago, Illinois)
- College: Arkansas–Fort Smith (1994–1996); Louisiana Tech (1996–1998)
- Playing career: 1998–2003
- Position: Center

Career history
- 1998: Colorado Xplosion
- 1999: Cleveland Rockers
- 2000–2002: Portland Fire
- 2003: Seattle Storm

Career highlights
- All-American – USBWA (1998); Second-team All-American – AP, USBWA (1998); Sun Belt Player of the Year (1997); 2x First-team All-Sun Belt (1997, 1998); First-team NJCAA All-American (1996)
- Stats at WNBA.com
- Stats at Basketball Reference

Alisa Marzatte Burras (born June 23, 1975) is an American former professional women's basketball player.

== Early life and education ==
She was born and raised in Chicago, Illinois.

== College career ==
Burras played for Westark Community College in Fort Smith, Arkansas from 1994 to 1996 and helped lead the Lady Lions to the 1995 JUCO National Championship. She left Westark with school records for points (1481), rebounds (534), and blocks (121). Legendary coach Leon Barmore offered Burras a scholarship to play for Louisiana Tech University, and she played with the Lady Techsters from 1996 to 1998. Burras led LA Tech to the NCAA Championship Game in 1998 but lost to Tennessee 93–74. In the championship game, she posted 19 points and 10 rebounds for the Lady Techsters. During her two seasons at LA Tech, the Lady Techsters compiled a 62–8 record.

== Professional career ==
=== ABL ===
Burras was drafted in the first round (fifth overall) by the Colorado Xplosion in the 1998 ABL Draft.

=== WNBA ===
When the ABL folded, she was signed by the WNBA and allocated to the Cleveland Rockers on May 11, 1999.

After the 1999 season on December 15, 1999, Burras was selected in the first round (fourth overall) of the 2000 expansion draft by the Portland Fire. She played for the Fire for 3 seasons until the franchise folded.

She was then selected ninth overall in the 2003 WNBA dispersal draft by the Seattle Storm. Burras retired after the 2003 season.

== Career statistics ==
Legend
GP	Games played	GS	Games started	MPG	Minutes per game	RPG	Rebounds per game
APG	Assists per game	SPG	Steals per game	BPG	Blocks per game	PPG	Points per game
TO	Turnovers per game	FG%	Field-goal percentage	3P%	3-point field-goal percentage	FT%	Free-throw percentage
**Bold**	Career best	°	League leader

=== WNBA ===
==== Regular season ====
Year	Team	GP	GS	MPG	FG%	3P%	FT%	RPG	APG	SPG	BPG	TO	PPG
1999	Cleveland	31	22	18.2	53.9	0.0	**55.3**	4.0	**0.5**	**0.5**	**0.3**	1.2	7.5
2000	Portland	21	4	15.0	58.7	0.0	75.6	3.5	0.3	0.1	**0.3**	1.7	7.6
2001	Portland	26	1	10.5	53.0	0.0	58.1	2.3	0.4	0.2	0.1	1.2	4.1
2002	Portland	**32**	**24**	**19.8**	**62.9**	0.0	84.6	**4.6**	0.2	0.3	0.2	1.5	**8.7**
2003	Seattle	27	2	10.0	46.7	0.0	70.4	2.3	0.2	0.2	0.2	**0.9**	3.3
**Career**	5 years, 3 teams	137	53	15.0	56.4	0.0	69.7	3.4	0.3	0.3	0.2	1.3	6.3

=== College ===
Year	Team	GP	GS	MPG	FG%	3P%	FT%	RPG	APG	SPG	BPG	TO	PPG
1996–97	Louisiana Tech	35	-	-	60.2	0.0	57.4	**9.5**	0.5	1.2	**1.6**	-	**18.2**
1997–98	Louisiana Tech	35	-	-	**60.5**	0.0	**58.0**	8.1	**0.7**	1.2	0.9	-	14.2
**Career**		70	-	-	60.3	0.0	57.7	8.8	0.6	1.2	1.3	-	16.2
Statistics retrieved from Sports-Reference.

== Honors ==
- University of Arkansas-Fort Smith Hall of Fame (2011)
