= Jenny Mowe =

American basketball player (born 1978)

Personal information
- Born: February 25, 1978 (age 48) Mission Viejo, California, U.S.
- Listed height: 6 ft 5 in (1.96 m)
- Listed weight: 236 lb (107 kg)

Career information
- High school: Powers (Powers, Oregon)
- College: Oregon (1996–2001)
- WNBA draft: 2001: 2nd round, 20th overall pick
- Drafted by: Portland Fire
- Playing career: 2001–2003
- Position: Center
- Number: 34

Career history
- 2001–2002: Portland Fire
- 2003: Los Angeles Sparks
- Stats at Basketball Reference
Medals
Women's basketball
Representing United States
FIBA Under-19 Women's Basketball World Cup
Gold medal – first place	1997 Brazil	Team competition

Jennifer Lee Mowe (born February 25, 1978) is an American former professional basketball player. She was the 20th pick in the 2001 WNBA draft, selected by the Portland Fire.

== High school ==
Mowe attended Powers High School in Powers, Oregon. In 1995, she led the Powers High School Cruisers to the Class 1A title. Mowe held 14 1A state tournament records until the records were reset during the reclassification of Oregon high schools.

== College ==
Mowe was the first Oregon Duck to get drafted into the WNBA. She later coached at Baker High School.

== Career statistics ==
Legend
GP	Games played	GS	Games started	MPG	Minutes per game	RPG	Rebounds per game
APG	Assists per game	SPG	Steals per game	BPG	Blocks per game	PPG	Points per game
TO	Turnovers per game	FG%	Field-goal percentage	3P%	3-point field-goal percentage	FT%	Free-throw percentage
**Bold**	Career best	°	League leader

=== WNBA ===
==== Regular season ====
WNBA regular season statistics
Year	Team	GP	GS	MPG	FG%	3P%	FT%	RPG	APG	SPG	BPG	TO	PPG
2001	Portland	**5**	0	3.4	**100.0**	—	—	0.6	0.0	0.0	0.2	0.4	**1.2**
2002	Portland	**5**	0	3.2	0.0	—	**50.0**	0.2	0.0	0.0	0.0	**0.2**	0.2
2003	Los Angeles	1	0	**21.0**	0.0	—	—	**1.0**	0.0	0.0	**1.0**	1.0	0.0
**Career**	3 years, 2 teams	11	0	4.9	50.0	—	50.0	0.5	0.0	0.0	0.2	0.4	0.6

=== College ===
NCAA statistics
Year	Team	GP	GS	MPG	FG%	3P%	FT%	RPG	APG	SPG	BPG	TO	PPG
1996–97	Oregon	29	-	-	53.3	—	48.7	3.9	0.4	0.5	1.0	-	6.9
1997–98	Oregon	4	-	-	52.4	—	57.9	**7.0**	0.0	0.0	**3.0**	-	**8.3**
1998–99	Oregon	**31**	-	-	**59.7**	—	57.3	4.8	0.6	0.5	2.0	-	7.5
1999–00	Oregon	**31**	-	-	56.9	—	**69.8**	5.7	0.7	**0.8**	2.1	-	5.7
2000–01	Oregon	29	-	-	59.5	—	57.1	5.6	**0.9**	0.7	1.8	-	8.3
**Career**		124	-	-	57.3	—	57.3	5.1	0.6	0.6	1.8	-	7.1

== Personal life ==
On June 9, 2007, Mowe married Loran Joseph of Baker City.

In 2011 Mowe started her own business in Baker City, Sweet Wife Baking.

== International competition ==
- 1997 USA Junior World Championship team- gold medal
- 1996 USA Junior World Championship Qualifying team
