= 2001 WNBA draft =

Women's basketball player selection

General information
- Sport: Basketball
- Date(s): April 20, 2001

Overview
- League: WNBA
- First selection: Lauren Jackson; Seattle Storm

2001 WNBA draft

- On April 20, 2001, the regular WNBA draft took place.

== Key ==
!	Denotes player who has been inducted to the Naismith Memorial Basketball Hall of Fame
^	Denotes player who has been inducted to the Women's Basketball Hall of Fame
*	Denotes player who has been selected for at least one All-Star Game and All-WNBA Team
^{+}	Denotes player who has been selected for at least one All-Star Game
^{#}	Denotes player who never played in the WNBA regular season or playoffs
**Bold**	Denotes player who won Rookie of the Year

== Draft ==
=== Round 1 ===
Pick	Player	Position	Nationality	Team	School / club team
1	Lauren Jackson * ^ !	F/C	Australia	Seattle Storm	Canberra Capitals (Australia)
2	Kelly Miller	G	United States	Charlotte Sting	Georgia
3	Tamika Catchings (Note: 2002 Rookie of the Year) * ^ !	F	United States	Indiana Fever	Tennessee
4	**Jackie Stiles** (Note: 2001 Rookie of the Year) ^{+} ^	G	United States	Portland Fire	Southwest Missouri State (Note: Became Missouri State in 2005.)
5	Ruth Riley ^{+} ^	C	United States	Miami Sol	Notre Dame
6	Deanna Nolan *	G/F	United States	Detroit Shock	Georgia
7	Svetlana Abrosimova	F	Russia	Minnesota Lynx	Connecticut
8	Marie Ferdinand ^{+}	G	United States	Utah Starzz	LSU
9	Coco Miller	G	United States	Washington Mystics	Georgia
10	Katie Douglas *	G/F	United States	Orlando Miracle	Purdue
11	Penny Taylor * ^	F	Australia	Cleveland Rockers	Dandenong Rangers (Australia)
12	LaQuanda Barksdale	G/F	United States	Portland Fire (from New York via Minnesota) (Note: February 20, 2001: Minnesota to Portland: Portland acquired Kristin Folkl and New York's first-round pick; Minnesota acquired Lynn Pride and Michele Van Gorp; September 13, 2000: New York to Minnesota: Minnesota acquired a 2001 first-round pick; New York acquired Grace Daley)	North Carolina
13	Kristen Veal	G	Australia	Phoenix Mercury	Canberra Capitals (Australia)
14	Kelly Schumacher	C	United States	Indiana Fever (from Sacramento) (Note: April 11, 2001: Sacramento to Indiana: Indiana acquired a first-round pick; Sacramento acquired Kara Wolters)	Connecticut
15	Amanda Lassiter	F	United States	Houston Comets	Missouri
16	Camille Cooper	C	United States	Los Angeles Sparks	Purdue

=== Round 2 ===
Pick	Player	Position	Nationality	Team	School / club team
17	Semeka Randall	G	United States	Seattle Storm	Tennessee
18	Tammy Sutton-Brown ^{+}	C	Canada	Charlotte Sting	Rutgers
19	Niele Ivey	G	United States	Indiana Fever	Notre Dame
20	Jenny Mowe	C	United States	Portland Fire	Oregon
21	Georgia Schweitzer	G/F	United States	Miami Sol	Duke
22	Jae Kingi	G	Australia	Detroit Shock	Adelaide Lightning (Australia)
23	Erin Buescher	G	United States	Minnesota Lynx	Master's
24	Michaela Pavlíčková	F/C	Czech Republic	Utah Starzz	Denver
25	Tamara Stocks	F/C	United States	Washington Mystics	Florida
26	Brooke Wyckoff	F	United States	Orlando Miracle	Florida State
27	Jaynetta Saunders	F	United States	Cleveland Rockers	Texas A&M
28	Janell Burse	C	United States	Minnesota Lynx (from New York via Washington) (Note: April 17, 2001: Three-team trade: Minnesota acquired New York's second-round pick from Washington; Washington acquired a third-round pick from New York and Annie Burgess from Minnesota; New York acquired a fourth-round pick and Andrea Nagy from Washington)	Tulane
29	Ilona Korstin	G/F	Russia	Phoenix Mercury	CJM Bourges Basket (France)
30	Jackie Moore	C	United States	Sacramento Monarchs	Long Beach State
31	Tynesha Lewis	G/F	United States	Houston Comets	North Carolina State
32	Nicole Levandusky	G	United States	Los Angeles Sparks	Xavier

=== Round 3 ===
Pick	Player	Position	Nationality	Team	School / club team
33	ShaRae Mansfield ^{#}	F	United States	Houston Comets (from Seattle) (Note: May 27, 2000: Seattle to Houston: Houston acquired a 2001 third-round pick; Seattle acquired the draft rights to Andrea Garner)	Western Kentucky
34	Jennifer Phillips ^{#}	F	United States	Charlotte Sting	Xavier
35	Marlena Williams ^{#}	F	United States	Indiana Fever	Missouri
36	Rasheeda Clark ^{#}	G	United States	Portland Fire	Pepperdine
37	Levys Torres	C	Colombia	Miami Sol	Florida State
38	Svetlana Volnaya ^{#}	G/F	Belarus	Detroit Shock	Virginia
39	Tombi Bell ^{#}	G	United States	Minnesota Lynx	Miami
40	Shea Ralph ^{#}	G/F	United States	Utah Starzz	Connecticut
41	Jamie Lewis ^{#}	G	United States	Washington Mystics	Ohio State
42	Jaclyn Johnson	F	United States	Orlando Miracle	Kansas
43	Angelina Wolvert	F	United States	Cleveland Rockers	Oregon
44	Elena Karpova ^{#}	F	Russia	Washington Mystics (from New York)	MBK Ružomberok (Slovakia)
45	Tere Williams ^{#}	F	United States	Phoenix Mercury	Virginia Tech
46	Maren Walseth	F	United States	Sacramento Monarchs	Penn State
47	Shala Crawford ^{#}	C	United States	Houston Comets	Life
48	Kelley Siemon ^{#}	F	United States	Los Angeles Sparks	Notre Dame

=== Round 4 ===
Pick	Player	Position	Nationality	Team	School / club team
49	Juana Brown ^{#}	G	United States	Seattle Storm	North Carolina
50	Reshea Bristol	G	United States	Charlotte Sting	Arizona
51	April Brown ^{#}	F	United States	Indiana Fever	LSU
52	Natasha Pointer ^{#}	G	United States	Portland Fire	Rutgers
53	Carolyn Moos	C	United States	Phoenix Mercury (from Miami) (Note: April 25, 2000: Miami to Phoenix: Phoenix acquired a 2001 fourth-round pick; Miami acquired the draft rights to Shantia Owens)	Stanford
54	Kelly Santos	F	Brazil	Detroit Shock	Brazil
55	Megan Taylor ^{#}	G/F	United States	Minnesota Lynx	Iowa State
56	Cara Consuegra	G	United States	Utah Starzz	Iowa
57	Taru Tuukkanen ^{#}	F/C	Finland	New York Liberty (from Washington)	Xavier
58	Anne Thorius ^{#}	G	Denmark	Orlando Miracle	Michigan
59	Erin Batth ^{#}	F/C	United States	Cleveland Rockers	Clemson
60	Tara Mitchem ^{#}	G	United States	New York Liberty	Southwest Missouri State
61	Megan Franza ^{#}	G	United States	Phoenix Mercury	Washington
62	Katie Smrcka-Duffy ^{#}	G	United States	Sacramento Monarchs	Georgetown
63	Kristen Clement ^{#}	G	United States	Houston Comets	Tennessee
64	Beth Record ^{#}	G/F	United States	Los Angeles Sparks	Syracuse

== See also ==
- List of first overall WNBA draft picks
