= Sylvia Crawley =

American basketball player and coach (born 1972)

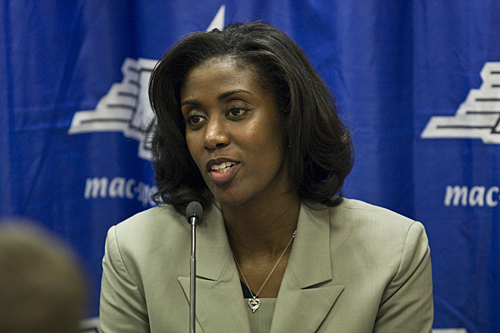
- Crawley in 2008

Biographical details
- Born: September 27, 1972 (age 54); Steubenville, Ohio, U.S.

Playing career
- 1990–1994: North Carolina
- 1996–1997: Colorado Xplosion
- 1997–1998: Portland Power
- 2000–2002: Portland Fire
- 2003: San Antonio Silver Stars
- Position: Forward / Center

Coaching career (HC unless noted)
- 2000–2002: North Carolina (assistant)
- 2004–2006: Fordham (assistant)
- 2006: Fordham (interim)
- 2006–2008: Ohio
- 2008–2012: Boston College
- 2014: Indiana Fever (assistant)
- 2016–2019: North Carolina (assistant)

Accomplishments and honors

Awards
- As a player: USA Basketball Female Athlete of the Year (1995); NCAA champion (1994)
Medal record
Women's basketball
Representing United States
WUG
Gold medal – first place	1995 World University Games; Fukuoka, Japan	Team competition
Jones Cup
Gold medal – first place	1996 Jones Cup; Taipei, Taiwan	Team Competition
Pan American Games
Bronze medal – third place	Winnipeg 1999	Team

Sylvia Crawley Spann (née Crawley; born September 27, 1972) is an American former professional basketball player and coach. She played for the Colorado Xplosion and Portland Power of the American Basketball League (ABL) and the Portland Fire and San Antonio Silver Stars of the Women's National Basketball Association (WNBA). She was the head women's basketball coach of the Ohio Bobcats and Boston College Eagles. She played college basketball for the North Carolina Tar Heels.

== Playing career ==
After starring at Steubenville High School, Crawley played collegiate basketball for the women's basketball team at the University of North Carolina at Chapel Hill (UNC). She was a member of the UNC's NCAA Women's Division I Basketball Championship team in 1994, her senior season.

After graduation from UNC, Crawley played for the Portland Power and Colorado Xplosion of the American Basketball League (ABL). She won the ABL's slam dunk contest in 1998 with a blindfolded dunk and a second dunk.

After the ABL folded due to financial problems, she was selected by the Portland Fire, and played with them for three seasons. When the Fire folded, Crawley was selected by the Indiana Fever during the WNBA's dispersal draft in April 2003. But prior to the start of the 2003 season, the Fever traded Crawley and a rookie player Gwen Jackson to the San Antonio Silver Stars, in exchange for Natalie Williams and Coretta Brown.

Crawley spent that one season with the Silver Stars in 2003, mostly in a reserve role, that was marred when she suffered a sprained neck injury after a collision with Washington Mystics player Tonya Washington while chasing for a loose ball.

Shortly before the 2004 WNBA season began, Crawley announced her retirement from basketball. But just prior to the start of the 2006 season, Crawley came out of retirement and signed a contract to return to the Silver Stars for the season. However, the day before the season started, the Silver Stars waived her from the training camp roster.

=== North Carolina statistics ===
Legend
GP	Games played	GS	Games started	MPG	Minutes per game
FG%	Field goal percentage	3P%	3-point field goal percentage	FT%	Free throw percentage
RPG	Rebounds per game	APG	Assists per game	SPG	Steals per game
BPG	Blocks per game	PPG	Points per game	**Bold**	Career high

Year	Team	GP	Points	FG%	3P%	FT%	RPG	APG	SPG	BPG	PPG
90–91	North Carolina	28	111	46.2%	0.0%	32.6%	3.6	0.3	0.3	1.1	4.0
91–92	North Carolina	31	254	45.8%	0.0%	54.0%	4.4	0.2	0.6	1.0	8.2
92–93	North Carolina	30	316	53.7%	0.0%	**66.7%**	**5.4**	0.5	0.8	0.8	10.5
93–94	North Carolina	**35**	**477**	**55.1%**	0.0%	62.6%	5.2	**0.9**	**1.1**	**1.1**	**13.6**
Career		124	1158	51.4%	0.0%	57.2%	4.7	0.5	0.7	1.0	9.3

== WNBA career statistics ==
Legend
GP	Games played	GS	Games started	MPG	Minutes per game	RPG	Rebounds per game
APG	Assists per game	SPG	Steals per game	BPG	Blocks per game	PPG	Points per game
TO	Turnovers per game	FG%	Field-goal percentage	3P%	3-point field-goal percentage	FT%	Free-throw percentage
**Bold**	Career best	°	League leader

=== Regular season ===
Year	Team	GP	GS	MPG	FG%	3P%	FT%	RPG	APG	SPG	BPG	TO	PPG
2000	Portland	31	30	**30.0**	**48.0**	0.0	69.6	6.0	1.1	**0.9**	0.8	**2.8**	**11.5**
2001	Portland	32	**32**	28.8	44.9	0.0	**76.6**	**6.3**	**1.7**	0.6	0.8	1.9	9.3
2002	Portland	32	31	25.6	40.1	**41.2**	69.8	4.2	1.5	0.6	**1.2**	1.9	8.7
2003	San Antonio	**33**	8	17.1	38.5	0.0	68.2	3.2	0.6	0.5	0.6	1.2	3.5
Career	1 year, 3 teams	128	101	25.3	43.6	35.0	71.6	4.9	1.2	0.7	0.8	2.0	8.2

== USA Basketball ==
Crawley was named to the team representing the USA at the 1995 Pan American Games, however, only four teams committed to participate, so the event was cancelled.

Crawley represented the USA at the 1995 World University Games held in Fukuoka, Japan in August and September 1995. The team had a record of 5–1, securing the silver medal. The USA team won early and reached a record of 5–0 when Crawley's 25 points helped the USA beat Yugoslavia. In the semi-final game, the USA faced Russia. The team was behind much of the first half but managed to tie the game at the half. The USA broke the game open in the second half and won 101–74. The gold medal match was against unbeaten Italy. The Italian team started strong, scoring 12 of the first 14 points of the contest. Crawley scored eight consecutive points to end the first half, but that left the USA nine points behind. The USA took a small lead in the second half, but the team from Italy responded with a ten-point run, and won the game and the gold medal by a score of 73–65. Crawley was the second leading scorer for the USA team with 15.1 points per game.

Crawley was named to the team representing the USA at the 1996 William Jones Cup competition in Taipei, Taiwan. The team won all nine games to win the gold medal. Crawley averaged 8.4 points per game and blocked ten shots. She was named to the All-Tournament second team.

Crawley again played with the USA team at the 1999 Pan American Games. The team finished with a record of 4–3, but managed to win the bronze medal with an 85–59 victory over Brazil. Crawley averaged 5.5 points per game.

== Coaching career ==
Crawley served as an assistant coach at her alma mater, the University of North Carolina, from 2000 to 2002 and returned in 2015. In her first two seasons with the Tar Heels, the team was 41–23 and made a Sweet Sixteen appearance in the 2002 NCAA Tournament. After the completion of her professional playing career in 2004, she served as the top assistant at Fordham University under head coach Jim Lewis. Following Lewis' retirement at the end of the 2005–2006 season, Crawley was named interim head coach.

Shortly thereafter, Crawley was named head coach of the Ohio Bobcats' women's basketball team on April 18, 2006. On April 28, 2008, Crawley was named the head coach of women's basketball at Boston College. Upon her hiring BC athletic director Gene DeFilippo stated "This is an exciting day for BC women's basketball. Sylvia Crawley has enjoyed phenomenal success both as a player and as a coach. As a North Carolina graduate, she knows the ACC inside and out. We are very fortunate to have her as our new coach." In her first season at the Heights, Sylvia led the Eagles to a 23–12 record and an appearance in the WNIT Final Four. In her next three seasons at BC, Crawley's teams went 17–15, 20–13 and 7–23. In her four season tenure at BC, Crawley's teams never posted a winning record against Atlantic Coast Conference opponents (overall ACC record: 20–38). On March 15, 2012, Crawley announced her resignation from the BC head coaching job, citing an unspecified medical issue.

After the departure of Mickie DeMoss, the Indiana Fever and head coach Lin Dunn named Crawley as an assistant coach with the team.

Crawley served as an assistant coach with her alma mater, the University of North Carolina from 2016 until 2019, when Sylvia Hatchell retired.

== Head coaching record ==
Record table
Season	Team	Overall	Conference	Standing	Postseason
**Ohio Bobcats** (Mid-American Conference) (2006–2008)
2006–07	Ohio	18–12	10–6	3rd (East)	
2007–08	Ohio	20–13	10–6	3rd (East)	
Ohio:		38–25 (.603)	20–12 (.625)		
**Boston College Eagles** (Atlantic Coast Conference) (2008–2012)
2008–09	Boston College	23–12	7–7	7th	WNIT Semifinals
2009–10	Boston College	17–15	6–8	T-7th	
2010–11	Boston College	20–12	5–9	T-7th	WNIT Sixteen
2011–12	Boston College	7–23	2–14	T-11th	
Ohio:		67–62 (.519)	20–38 (.345)		
Total:		105–87 (.547)			
National champion Postseason invitational champion Conference regular season champion Conference regular season and conference tournament champion Division regular season champion Division regular season and conference tournament champion Conference tournament champion
