= 2001 Portland Fire season =

- Head coach: Linda Hargrove
- Arena: Rose Garden

Results
- Record: 11–21 (.344)
- Place: 7th (Western)
- Playoff finish: Did not qualify

Media
- Television: KPTV (UPN 12)

The 2001 WNBA season was the 2nd season for the Portland Fire. The Fire failed to qualify for the WNBA Playoffs for the second consecutive year.

== Transactions ==
=== WNBA draft ===
Round	Pick	Player	Nationality	School/Team/Country
1	4	Jackie Stiles	United States	Southwest Missouri State
1	12	LaQuanda Barksdale	United States	North Carolina
2	20	Jenny Mowe	United States	Oregon
3	36	Rasheeda Clark	United States	Pepperdine
4	52	Natasha Pointer	United States	Rutgers

=== Transactions ===
Date	Transaction
February 20, 2001	Traded Lynn Pride and Michele Van Gorp to the Minnesota Lynx in exchange for Kristin Folkl and a 2001 2nd Round Pick
April 17, 2001	Waived Tara Williams
April 20, 2001	Drafted Jackie Stiles, LaQuanda Barksdale, Jenny Mowe, Rasheeda Clark and Natasha Pointer in the 2001 WNBA draft
April 24, 2001	Waived Jamila Wideman
May 12, 2001	Traded a 2002 2nd Round Pick to the Detroit Shock in exchange for Tamicha Jackson and a 2002 4th Round Pick
May 26, 2001	Waived Michelle Marciniak and Rasheeda Clark

== Roster ==
2001 Portland Fire roster
Players
Coaches

Pos.	No.	Nat.	Name	Height	Weight	DOB	From	Yrs
G	33	(United States)	Barksdale, LaQuanda	5' 10" (1.78m)		1979-10-03	North Carolina	R
G	4	(Australia)	Bevilaqua, Tully	5' 7" (1.7m)	145 lb (66kg)	1972-07-19		2
C	41	(United States)	Burras, Alisa	6' 3" (1.91m)	218 lb (99kg)	1975-06-23	Louisiana Tech	2
F	0	(United States)	Crawley, Sylvia	6' 5" (1.96m)	187 lb (85kg)	1972-09-27	North Carolina	1
F	24	(United States)	Folkl, Kristin	6' 2" (1.88m)	190 lb (86kg)	1975-12-19	Stanford	2
G	35	(United States)	Jackson, Tamicha	5' 6" (1.68m)	120 lb (54kg)	1978-04-22	Louisiana Tech	1
C	34	(United States)	Mowe, Jenny	6' 5" (1.96m)		1978-02-25	Oregon	R
F	17	(United States)	Nygaard, Vanessa	6' 1" (1.85m)	175 lb (79kg)	1975-03-13	Stanford	2
G	34	(United States)	Stiles, Jackie	5' 8" (1.73m)	144 lb (65kg)	1978-12-21	Missouri State	R
F	11	(United States)	Thomas, Stacey	5' 10" (1.78m)	154 lb (70kg)	1978-08-29	Michigan	1
F	22	(United States)	Walker, DeMya	6' 3" (1.91m)	191 lb (87kg)	1977-11-28	Virginia	1
G	13	(United States)	Witherspoon, Sophia	5' 10" (1.78m)	145 lb (66kg)	1969-07-06	Florida	4
G	12	(United States)	Young, Carolyn	5' 9" (1.75m)	175 lb (79kg)	1969-07-28	Auburn	R

Head coach
(United States) Linda Hargrove (Southwestern (KS))

Legend

- (C) Team captain
- (DP) Unsigned draft pick
- (FA) Free agent
- (S) Suspended
- Injured

== Schedule ==
=== Regular season ===
2001 game log
Total: 11–21 (Home: 6–11; Road: 5–10)
May: 0–1 (Home: 0–1; Road: 0–0)

Game	Date	Team	Score	High points	High rebounds	High assists	Location Attendance	Record
1	May 31	Minnesota	L 65–82	Jackie Stiles (17)	Kristin Folkl (10)	Tully Bevilaqua (4)	Rose Garden	0–1

June: 8–3 (Home: 4–0; Road: 4–3)

Game	Date	Team	Score	High points	High rebounds	High assists	Location Attendance	Record
2	June 2	@ Utah	W 76–71	Sophia Witherspoon (23)	Sylvia Crawley (15)	Tully Bevilaqua (6)	Delta Center	1–1
3	June 4	Phoenix	W 71–69 (OT)	Sophia Witherspoon (22)	Sylvia Crawley (13)	Tully Bevilaqua (4)	Rose Garden	2–1
4	June 12	Cleveland	W 67–62	Sophia Witherspoon (20)	Sylvia Crawley (6)	Tully Bevilaqua (6)	Rose Garden	3–1
5	June 16	@ Sacramento	W 81–74 (OT)	Jackie Stiles (21)	Kristin Folkl (13)	Sophia Witherspoon (4)	ARCO Arena	4–1
6	June 17	@ Los Angeles	L 75–90	Sophia Witherspoon (19)	Stacey Thomas (5)	Bevilaqua; Jackson (5)	Staples Center	4–2
7	June 19	Seattle	W 58–43	Tully Bevilaqua (12)	Kristin Folkl (12)	Crawley; Folkl (3)	Rose Garden	5–2
8	June 22	Charlotte	W 66–62	Jackie Stiles (24)	Crawley; Folkl (6)	Tully Bevilaqua (5)	Rose Garden	6–2
9	June 24	@ Houston	L 57–67	Jackie Stiles (17)	Sylvia Crawley (8)	Tully Bevilaqua (2)	Compaq Center	6–3
10	June 26	@ Cleveland	L 57–61	Jackie Stiles (22)	Kristin Folkl (11)	Sophia Witherspoon (5)	Gund Arena	6–4
11	June 27	@ Indiana	W 68–65	Jackie Stiles (26)	Crawley; Folkl (6)	Bevilaqua; Stiles (4)	Conseco Fieldhouse	7–4
12	June 29	@ Miami	W 74–72	Sophia Witherspoon (26)	Kristin Folkl (13)	Stacey Thomas (3)	American Airlines Arena	8–4

July : 3–10 (Home: 2–6; Road: 1–4)

Game	Date	Team	Score	High points	High rebounds	High assists	Location Attendance	Record
13	July 2	@ Houston	L 67–74	Jackie Stiles (20)	Crawley; Folkl (4)	Folkl; Stiles; Witherspoon (2)	Compaq Center	8–5
14	July 4	Seattle	L 56–61	Jackie Stiles (18)	Kristin Folkl (9)	Kristin Folkl (4)	Rose Garden	8–6
15	July 6	Washington	W 69–58	Jackie Stiles (21)	Sylvia Crawley (7)	Tully Bevilaqua (6)	Rose Garden	9–6
16	July 8	Utah	L 63–65	Jackie Stiles (18)	Sylvia Crawley (10)	Tamicha Jackson (5)	Rose Garden	9–7
17	July 10	@ Minnesota	L 52–73	Sylvia Crawley (15)	Sylvia Crawley (9)	Bevilaqua; Burras; Stiles; Witherspoon (7)	Target Center	9–8
18	July 12	Houston	L 57–71	Jackie Stiles (19)	Sylvia Crawley (11)	Tully Bevilaqua (6)	Rose Garden	9–9
19	July 19	@ Phoenix	L 58–60	Kristin Folkl (12)	Kristin Folkl (10)	Bevilaqua; Stiles (3)	America West Arena	9–10
20	July 20	@ Seattle	W 56–49	Sophia Witherspoon (21)	Kristin Folkl (11)	Tully Bevilaqua (4)	KeyArena	10–10
21	July 22	Detroit	L 77–80 (OT)	Jackie Stiles (21)	Kristin Folkl (12)	Tully Bevilaqua (4)	Rose Garden	10–11
22	July 24	New York	W 86–68	Sophia Witherspoon (15)	Kristin Folkl (7)	Bevilaqua; Crawley (4)	Rose Garden	11–11
23	July 27	@ Sacramento	L 62–85	Tamicha Jackson (12)	Burras; Crawley (4)	Sophia Witherspoon (3)	ARCO Arena	11–12
24	July 28	Los Angeles	L 83–88	Jackie Stiles (32)	Kristin Folkl (13)	Crawley; Folkl; Stiles (4)	Rose Garden	11–13
25	July 30	Utah	L 73–79	Jackie Stiles (16)	Kristin Folkl (9)	Folkl; Jackson; Stiles (3)	Rose Garden	11–14

August : 0–7 (Home: 0–4; Road: 0–3)

Game	Date	Team	Score	High points	High rebounds	High assists	Location Attendance	Record
26	August 1	@ Orlando	L 63–65	Jackie Stiles (13)	Kristin Folkl (6)	Sylvia Crawley (5)	TD Waterhouse Centre	11–15
27	August 3	@ Washington	L 50–64	Carolyn Young (13)	Sylvia Crawley (11)	Stacey Thomas (3)	MCI Center	11–16
28	August 4	@ Detroit	L 65–70	Jackie Stiles (16)	Kristin Folkl (6)	Carolyn Young (4)	The Palace of Auburn Hills	11–17
29	August 8	Minnesota	L 58–70	Jackie Stiles (14)	Kristin Folkl (7)	Tamicha Jackson (4)	Rose Garden	11–18
30	August 11	@ Phoenix	L 62–73	Jackie Stiles (18)	DeMya Walker (6)	Tully Bevilaqua (4)	America West Arena	11–19
31	August 12	Sacramento	L 58–64	Alisa Burras (18)	Kristin Folkl (6)	Tully Bevilaqua (5)	Rose Garden	11–20
32	August 14	Los Angeles	L 58–67	Sophia Witherspoon (15)	Kristin Folkl (7)	Bevilaqua; Crawley (5)	Rose Garden	11–21

2001 season schedule

=== Season standings ===
Western Conference	W	L	PCT	Conf.	GB
Los Angeles Sparks ^{x}	28	4	.875	19–2	–
Sacramento Monarchs ^{x}	20	12	.625	13–8	8.0
Utah Starzz ^{x}	19	13	.594	11–10	9.0
Houston Comets ^{x}	19	13	.594	13–8	9.0
Phoenix Mercury ^{o}	13	19	.406	8–13	15.0
Minnesota Lynx ^{o}	12	20	.375	9–12	16.0
Portland Fire ^{o}	11	21	.344	5–16	17.0
Seattle Storm ^{o}	10	22	.313	6–15	18.0

== Statistics ==
Legend
GP	Games played	GS	Games started	MPG	Minutes per game	RPG	Rebounds per game
APG	Assists per game	SPG	Steals per game	BPG	Blocks per game	PPG	Points per game
FG%	Field-goal percentage	3P%	3-point field-goal percentage	FT%	Free-throw percentage	TO	Turnovers per game
PF	Fouls per game		Team leader		League leader

=== Regular season ===
Player	GP	GS	MPG	FG%	3P%	FT%	RPG	APG	SPG	BPG	PPG
Jackie Stiles	32	32	32.0	.405	.431	.779	2.4	1.7	0.8	0.1	14.9
Sylvia Crawley	32	32	28.8	.449	.000	.766	6.3	1.7	0.6	0.8	9.3
Sophia Witherspoon	31	30	27.8	.316	.313	.849	2.4	1.7	1.0	0.3	12.0
Kristin Folkl	32	31	26.9	.428	.417	.825	7.7	1.4	0.6	1.1	5.6
Tully Bevilaqua	31	31	25.4	.328	.315	.732	2.8	3.3	1.9	0.2	4.9
Tamicha Jackson	32	1	15.5	.325	.154	.696	1.4	1.6	0.9	0.0	4.1
DeMya Walker	21	0	14.1	.440	.667	.575	2.8	0.5	0.3	0.6	5.4
Stacey Thomas	32	1	12.9	.367	.000	.429	2.2	1.3	0.9	0.3	1.8
Carolyn Young	23	1	12.1	.374	.294	.730	1.5	0.7	0.6	0.0	4.8
Alisa Burras	26	1	10.5	.530	N/A	.581	2.3	0.4	0.2	0.1	4.1
Vanessa Nygaard	31	0	8.4	.389	.388	.333	1.1	0.3	0.2	0.1	2.5
LaQuanda Barksdale	5	0	7.0	.100	.000	N/A	1.2	0.8	0.4	0.0	0.4
Jenny Mowe	5	0	3.4	1.000	N/A	N/A	0.6	0.0	0.0	0.2	1.2

^{‡}Waived/Released during the season
^{†}Traded during the season
^{≠}Acquired during the season
