= LaQuanda Barksdale =

American basketball player

Personal information
- Born: October 3, 1979 (age 47)
- Listed height: 5 ft 10 in (1.78 m)
- Listed weight: 156 lb (71 kg)

Career information
- High school: West Forsyth (Clemmons, North Carolina)
- College: North Carolina (1997–2001)
- WNBA draft: 2001: 1st round, 12th overall pick
- Drafted by: Portland Fire
- Position: Guard / forward
- Number: 33

Career history
- 2001–2002: Portland Fire
- 2003: San Antonio Silver Stars

Career highlights
- 2× First-team All-ACC (2000, 2001)
- Stats at Basketball Reference
Medals
Women's basketball
Representing United States
World University Games
Silver medal – second place	1999 Spain	Team competition

LaQuanda Barksdale (born October 3, 1979) is a former professional basketball player in the WNBA. She was pick 12th overall in the 2001 WNBA draft. In the 2003 WNBA season she ranked #1 in three-point field goals made per 40 minutes (3.57).

== College ==
During her freshman year at North Carolina, Barksdale helped her team win the ACC women's basketball tournament.

== Career statistics ==
Legend
GP	Games played	GS	Games started	MPG	Minutes per game	RPG	Rebounds per game
APG	Assists per game	SPG	Steals per game	BPG	Blocks per game	PPG	Points per game
TO	Turnovers per game	FG%	Field-goal percentage	3P%	3-point field-goal percentage	FT%	Free-throw percentage
**Bold**	Career best	°	League leader

=== WNBA ===
==== Regular season ====
WNBA regular season statistics
Year	Team	GP	GS	MPG	FG%	3P%	FT%	RPG	APG	SPG	BPG	TO	PPG
2001	Portland	5	0	7.0	10.0	0.0	—	1.2	**0.8**	0.4	0.0	**0.2**	0.4
2002	Portland	17	**3**	**16.8**	**35.6**	22.7	88.5	**2.4**	0.7	**0.5**	**0.4**	1.4	**5.9**
2003	San Antonio	**26**	0	6.5	26.6	**28.8**	**100.0**	1.3	0.2	0.0	0.1	0.4	2.3
**Career**	3 years, 2 teams	48	3	10.2	30.5	26.0	89.3	1.6	0.4	0.2	0.2	0.7	3.4

=== College ===
NCAA statistics
Year	Team	GP	Points	FG%	3P%	FT%	RPG	APG	SPG	BPG	PPG
1997–98	North Carolina	32	154	48.5%	34.8%	74.1%	2.4	0.3	0.6	0.3	4.8
1998–99	North Carolina	**36**	500	**49.0%**	31.5%	**78.1%**	7.8	0.8	1.3	**0.9**	13.9
1999–00	North Carolina	33	**581**	44.6%	**41.0%**	77.8%	8.6	1.2	**1.5**	0.1	17.6°
2000–01	North Carolina	29	552	44.9%	35.9%	72.0%	**11.5**	**1.4**	1.4	0.5	**19.0**°
**Career**		130	1787	46.2%	35.6%	75.6%	7.5	0.9	1.2	0.5	13.7

== Personal life ==
At North Carolina Barksdale majored in psychology.
