= Tamicha Jackson =

American basketball player (born 1978)

Personal information
- Born: April 22, 1978 (age 48) Dallas, Texas, U.S.
- Listed height: 5 ft 6 in (1.68 m)
- Listed weight: 116 lb (53 kg)

Career information
- High school: Lincoln (Dallas, Texas)
- College: Louisiana Tech (1996–2000)
- WNBA draft: 2000: 1st round, 8th overall pick
- Drafted by: Detroit Shock
- Playing career: 2000–2006
- Position: Point guard

Career history
- 2000: Detroit Shock
- 2001–2002: Portland Fire
- 2003: Phoenix Mercury
- 2004–2005: Washington Mystics
- 2006: Phoenix Mercury

Career highlights
- Third-team All-American – AP (2000); Kodak All-American (2000); Sun Belt Defensive Player of the Year (2000); Sun Belt Tournament MVP (1997); 4x All-Sun Belt Team (1997–2000)
- Stats at WNBA.com
- Stats at Basketball Reference
Medals
Women's basketball
Representing United States
FIBA Under-19 World Cup
Gold medal – first place	1997 Brazil	Team

Tamicha Renia Jackson (born April 22, 1978) is an American former women's basketball player. She earned a gold medal with the US Junior World Championship team (1996–97). She was named Kodak All-American for the Lady Techsters in 2000. Tamicha graduated from Louisiana Tech University in 2000 with a degree in Animal Biology.

== Career statistics ==
Legend
GP	Games played	GS	Games started	MPG	Minutes per game	RPG	Rebounds per game
APG	Assists per game	SPG	Steals per game	BPG	Blocks per game	PPG	Points per game
TO	Turnovers per game	FG%	Field-goal percentage	3P%	3-point field-goal percentage	FT%	Free-throw percentage
**Bold**	Career best	°	League leader

=== WNBA career statistics ===
==== Regular season ====
Year	Team	GP	GS	MPG	FG%	3P%	FT%	RPG	APG	SPG	BPG	TO	PPG
2000	Detroit	17	0	15.7	38.7	25.0	74.3	1.5	2.1	1.3	0.0	1.2	6.8
2001	Portland	32	1	15.5	32.5	15.4	69.6	1.4	1.6	0.9	0.0	1.4	4.1
2002	Portland	32	10	21.6	41.9	31.6	69.7	1.8	3.0	1.7	0.0	2.0	**9.8**
2003	Phoenix	**34**	**34**	**28.2**	34.3	35.4	**81.0**	**2.4**	**4.3**	1.5	0.1	2.2	8.8
2004	Washington	25	12	16.2	**42.2**	**40.0**	68.8	1.5	1.8	0.8	0.0	1.1	5.4
2005	Washington	8	0	8.5	15.4	11.1	0.0	0.8	1.3	0.6	0.0	**0.5**	1.1
2006	Phoenix	3	2	18.0	35.7	0.0	66.7	1.3	2.3	**2.0**	**0.3**	1.3	8.0
Career	7 years, 4 teams	151	59	19.5	37.0	29.7	71.0	1.7	2.6	1.2	0.0	1.6	6.8

==== Playoffs ====
Year	Team	GP	GS	MPG	FG%	3P%	FT%	RPG	APG	SPG	BPG	TO	PPG
2004	Washington	3	0	14.0	46.2	60.0	100.0	0.3	1.3	0.0	0.0	0.7	5.7
Career	1 year, 1 team	3	0	14.0	46.2	60.0	100.0	0.3	1.3	0.0	0.0	0.7	5.7

=== College career statistics ===
Legend
GP	Games played	GS	Games started	MPG	Minutes per game
FG%	Field goal percentage	3P%	3-point field goal percentage	FT%	Free throw percentage
RPG	Rebounds per game	APG	Assists per game	SPG	Steals per game
BPG	Blocks per game	PPG	Points per game	**Bold**	Career high

Year	Team	GP	Points	FG%	3P%	FT%	RPG	APG	SPG	BPG	PPG
1996–97	Louisiana Tech	**35**	156	36.4%	33.1%	61.0%	2.6	3.8	2.3	**0.2**	4.5
1997–98	Louisiana Tech	33	481	44.3%	34.1%	60.6%	**3.3**	**4.7**	2.5	0.2	14.6
1998–99	Louisiana Tech	33	384	41.1%	26.9%	**81.0%**	1.9	2.2	2.5	–	11.6
1999-00	Louisiana Tech	34	**529**	**48.7%**	**37.4%**	73.6%	2.6	3.4	**3.3**	0.1	**15.6**
Career		135	1550	42.6%	32.9%	69.0%	2.6	3.5	2.7	0.1	11.5

== USA Basketball ==
Jackson was named to the USA Basketball Women's Junior National Team when it was invited to the 1997 FIBA Junior World Championship (now called U19) held in Natal, Brazil. After beating Japan, the next game was against Australia, the defending champion. The USA team pulled out to a 13-point lead in the second half, but gave up the lead and lost the game 80–74. The USA rebounded with a close 92–88 victory over Cuba, helped by 23 points each from Maylana Martin and Lynn Pride. The USA then went on to beat previously unbeaten Russia. After winning the next two games, the USA faced Australia in the gold medal game. The USA team has a three-point lead late, but the Aussies hit a three-pointer with three seconds left in regulation to force overtime. Although the Aussies scored first, the USA team came back, then pulled into the lead and held on to win 78–74 to earn the gold, and the first medal for a USA team at a Junior World Championship. Jackson averaged 3.0 points per game.
