= Kristin Folkl =

American basketball and volleyball player (born 1975)

Kristin Folkl-Kaburakis
Personal information
- Born: December 19, 1975 (age 50) St. Louis, Missouri, U.S.
- Listed height: 6 ft 2 in (1.88 m)

Career information
- High school: St. Joseph's Academy (St. Louis)
- College: Stanford (1994–1998)
- Position: Forward

Career history
- 1999–2000: Minnesota Lynx
- 2001–2002: Portland Fire

Career highlights
- Kodak All-American (1998); Second-team All-American – AP (1998); All-American – USBWA (1998); All Pac-10 (1998); Miss Show-Me Basketball (1994)
- Stats at Basketball Reference

Kristin Just Folkl (born December 19, 1975) is an American former volleyball player and collegiate and professional women's basketball player. She now goes by her married name of Kristin Folkl-Kaburakis. As a volleyball player she was part of the United States National Team.

== Early life and college ==
She played basketball and volleyball at St. Joseph's Academy in her hometown of St. Louis, Missouri, leading both of her sports teams to state championships each year in which she played. Folkl was named a High School All-American by the WBCA. She participated in the WBCA High School All-America Game in 1994, scoring twenty-three points.

From 1994 until 1998, Folkl attended Stanford University and starred on their women's basketball and volleyball programs.

While at Stanford, she was a four-time volleyball All-American, a basketball all-American as a senior, an All Pac-10 member, and a two-sport academic all-American. She appeared in a total of six Final Fours (four in volleyball and two in basketball) and won three national championships in volleyball. In her senior year, she was a first team All-American in both sports and was named the GTE Academic Player of the Year. She was also a participant on the USA Women's National Volleyball Team, and was a first-alternate at the 1996 Summer Olympics.

In 1998, she won the Honda Sports Award as the nation's best female collegiate volleyball player.

Folkl graduated from Stanford in 1998 with a degree in economics. She has been inducted into Stanford University's Hall of Fame.

== WNBA and overseas basketball career ==
Folkl was selected as part of the initial player allocation by the Minnesota Lynx on September 15, 1998.

She was traded to the Portland Fire in 2000 to become a part of the expansion season Portland team.

She also played professional basketball overseas for teams in Australia, Switzerland, and Greece.

== Basketball career statistics ==
Legend
GP	Games played	GS	Games started	MPG	Minutes per game	RPG	Rebounds per game
APG	Assists per game	SPG	Steals per game	BPG	Blocks per game	PPG	Points per game
TO	Turnovers per game	FG%	Field-goal percentage	3P%	3-point field-goal percentage	FT%	Free-throw percentage
**Bold**	Career best	°	League leader

=== WNBA ===
==== Regular season ====
Year	Team	GP	GS	MPG	FG%	3P%	FT%	RPG	APG	SPG	BPG	TO	PPG
1999	Minnesota	**32**	1	16.2	.479	.143	.538	3.6	0.7	0.4	0.4	0.7	4.9
2000	Minnesota	**32**	20	26.4	.450	.211	.702	4.8	**2.1**	**0.7**	0.7	1.6	**7.6**
2001	Portland	**32**	**31**	**26.9**	.428	**.417**	.825	**7.7**	1.4	0.6	**1.1**	1.2	5.6
2002	Portland	**32**	4	18.8	**.492**	.000	**.886**	4.6	1.0	0.6	0.5	1.0	4.8
Career	4 years, 2 teams	128	56	22.1	.459	.229	.726	5.2	1.3	0.6	0.7	1.1	5.7

=== College ===
Year	Team	GP	GS	MPG	FG%	3P%	FT%	RPG	APG	SPG	BPG	TO	PPG
1994–95	Stanford	**24**	-	-	56.2	**50.0**	69.1	5.5	2.1	0.8	0.7	-	9.5
1995–96	Stanford	Did not play											
1996–97	Stanford	10	-	-	**70.7**	0.0	58.1	8.2	**2.1**	**1.2**	**1.1**	-	10.7
1997–98	Stanford	18	-	-	69.5	0.0	**70.1**	**9.2**	1.3	1.1	0.7	-	**18.9**
**Career**		52	-	-	64.4	44.4	67.8	7.3	1.8	1.0	0.8	-	13.0
Statistics retrieved from Sports-Reference.

== Life after basketball ==
After her retirement from the WNBA, she returned to her hometown of St. Louis and served as a development officer for the Institute for Science and Health.

Since 2004, she has been serving as the director for development on the St. Louis Sports Commission, a privately funded non-profit organization. Her duties include directing the revenue generation and fundraising efforts for the commission as well its affiliated St. Louis Sports Foundation. She also coordinates the commission's partnership and membership programs.

Folkl is married to Tassos Kaburakis, an attorney and a professor in sport law and management at Saint Louis University.

According to an article in the St. Louis Post-Dispatch, she gave birth to her first child, Ian Nicholas, on August 29, 2006.
