= WNBA Rookie of the Year =

Women's National Basketball Association award

The Women's National Basketball Association's Rookie of the Year Award is an annual Women's National Basketball Association (WNBA) award given since the 1998 WNBA season, to the top rookie of the regular season. The winner is selected by a panel of sportswriters throughout the United States, each of whom casts a vote for first, second, and third place selections. Each first-place vote is worth five points; each second-place vote is worth three points; and each third-place vote is worth one point. The player(s) with the highest point total, regardless of the number of first-place votes, wins the award.

The 2003 award winner Cheryl Ford and 2011 award winner Maya Moore are the only players to win both the WNBA Rookie of the Year award and a WNBA championship in the same season.

The 2008 award winner Candace Parker became the first player to win the award after garnering all possible votes and also the first player to win the WNBA Most Valuable Player Award in the same season. In the NBA, only Wilt Chamberlain and Wes Unseld have won the Most Valuable Player Award and Rookie of the Year Award in the same season.

The 2020 award winner Crystal Dangerfield is the first who was not chosen in the first round of the draft; she was chosen in the second round in 2020 as the 16th overall pick.

As of 2019, eight Rookie of the Year recipients have gone on to become a member of a WNBA championship team.

== Winners ==
Key
^	Denotes player who is still active in the WNBA
*	Elected to the Naismith Basketball Hall of Fame as player
	Inducted into the Women's Basketball Hall of Fame
†	Not yet eligible for Hall of Fame consideration (Note: A player is not eligible for induction into the Naismith Basketball Hall of Fame until she has been fully retired for two calendar years.)
**Player** (in bold text)	Denotes unanimous winners

Rookie of the Year
Season	Player	Position	Nationality	Team	School	Pick	Year	Ref.
1998	Tracy Reid	Forward	United States	Charlotte Sting	UNC (Sr.)	7	1998	
1999	Chamique Holdsclaw*	Forward	United States	Washington Mystics	Tennessee (Sr.)	1	1999	
2000	Betty Lennox	Guard	United States	Minnesota Lynx	Louisiana Tech (Sr.)	6	2000	
2001	Jackie Stiles	Guard	United States	Portland Fire	Missouri State (Sr.)	4	2001	
2002	Tamika Catchings*	Forward	United States	Indiana Fever	Tennessee (Sr.)	3	2001	
2003	Cheryl Ford	Forward	United States	Detroit Shock	Louisiana Tech (Sr.)	3	2003	
2004	Diana Taurasi^{†}	Guard	United States	Phoenix Mercury	UConn (Sr.)	1	2004	
2005	Temeka Johnson	Guard	United States	Washington Mystics (2)	LSU (Sr.)	6	2005	
2006	Seimone Augustus*	Guard/Forward	United States	Minnesota Lynx (2)	LSU (Sr.)	1	2006	
2007	Armintie Price	Guard	United States	Chicago Sky	Ole Miss (Sr.)	3	2007	
2008	Candace Parker*	Forward/Center	United States	Los Angeles Sparks	Tennessee (Jr.)	1	2008	
2009	Angel McCoughtry^{†}	Forward	United States	Atlanta Dream	Louisville (Sr.)	1	2009	
2010	**Tina Charles**^	Center	United States	Connecticut Sun	UConn (Sr.)	1	2010	
2011	Maya Moore*	Forward	United States	Minnesota Lynx (3)	UConn (Sr.)	1	2011	
2012	Nneka Ogwumike^{†}	Forward	United States	Los Angeles Sparks (2)	Stanford (Sr.)	1	2012	
2013	**Elena Delle Donne***	Guard/Forward	United States	Chicago Sky (2)	Delaware (Sr.)	2	2013	
2014	Chiney Ogwumike^{†}	Forward	United States	Connecticut Sun (2)	Stanford (Sr.)	1	2014	
2015	Jewell Loyd^	Guard	United States	Seattle Storm	Notre Dame (Jr.)	1	2015	
2016	Breanna Stewart^	Forward/Center	United States	Seattle Storm (2)	UConn (Sr.)	1	2016	
2017	Allisha Gray^	Guard	United States	Dallas Wings (2)	South Carolina (Jr.)	4	2017	
2018	**A'ja Wilson**^	Forward	United States	Las Vegas Aces	South Carolina (Sr.)	1	2018	
2019	Napheesa Collier^	Forward	United States	Minnesota Lynx (4)	UConn (Sr.)	6	2019	
2020	Crystal Dangerfield^	Guard	United States	Minnesota Lynx (5)	UConn (Sr.)	16	2020	
2021	Michaela Onyenwere^	Forward	United States	New York Liberty	UCLA (Sr.)	6	2021	
2022	Rhyne Howard^	Guard	United States	Atlanta Dream (2)	Kentucky (Sr.)	1	2022	
2023	**Aliyah Boston**^	Forward/Center	United States	Indiana Fever (2)	South Carolina (Sr.)	1	2023	
2024	Caitlin Clark^	Guard	United States	Indiana Fever (3)	Iowa (Sr.)	1	2024	
2025	Paige Bueckers^	Guard	United States	Dallas Wings (3)	UConn (Sr.)	1	2025	
2026	**Olivia Miles**^	Guard	United States	Minnesota Lynx (6)	TCU (Sr.)	2	2026	

== Teams ==
WNBA ROTY Winners
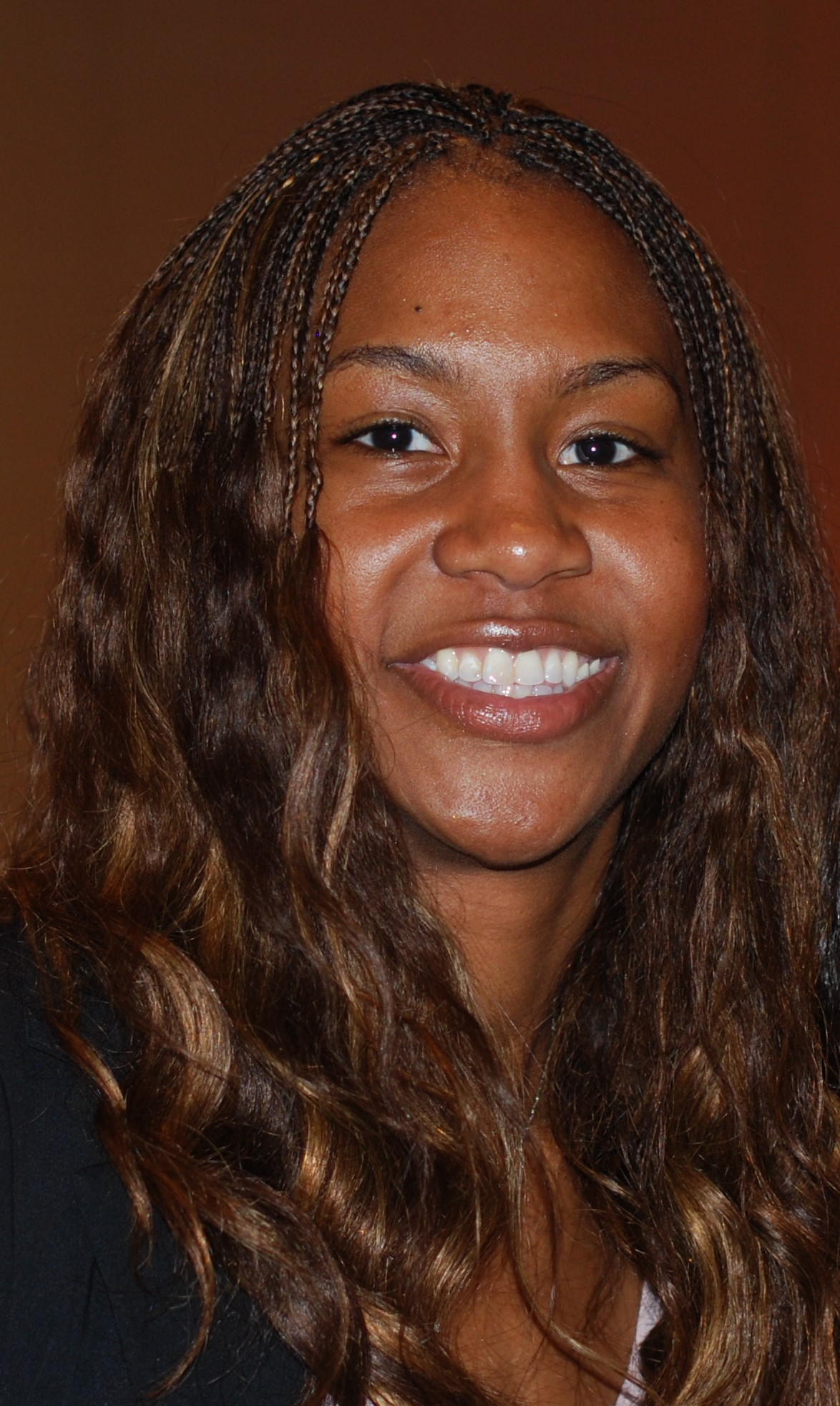
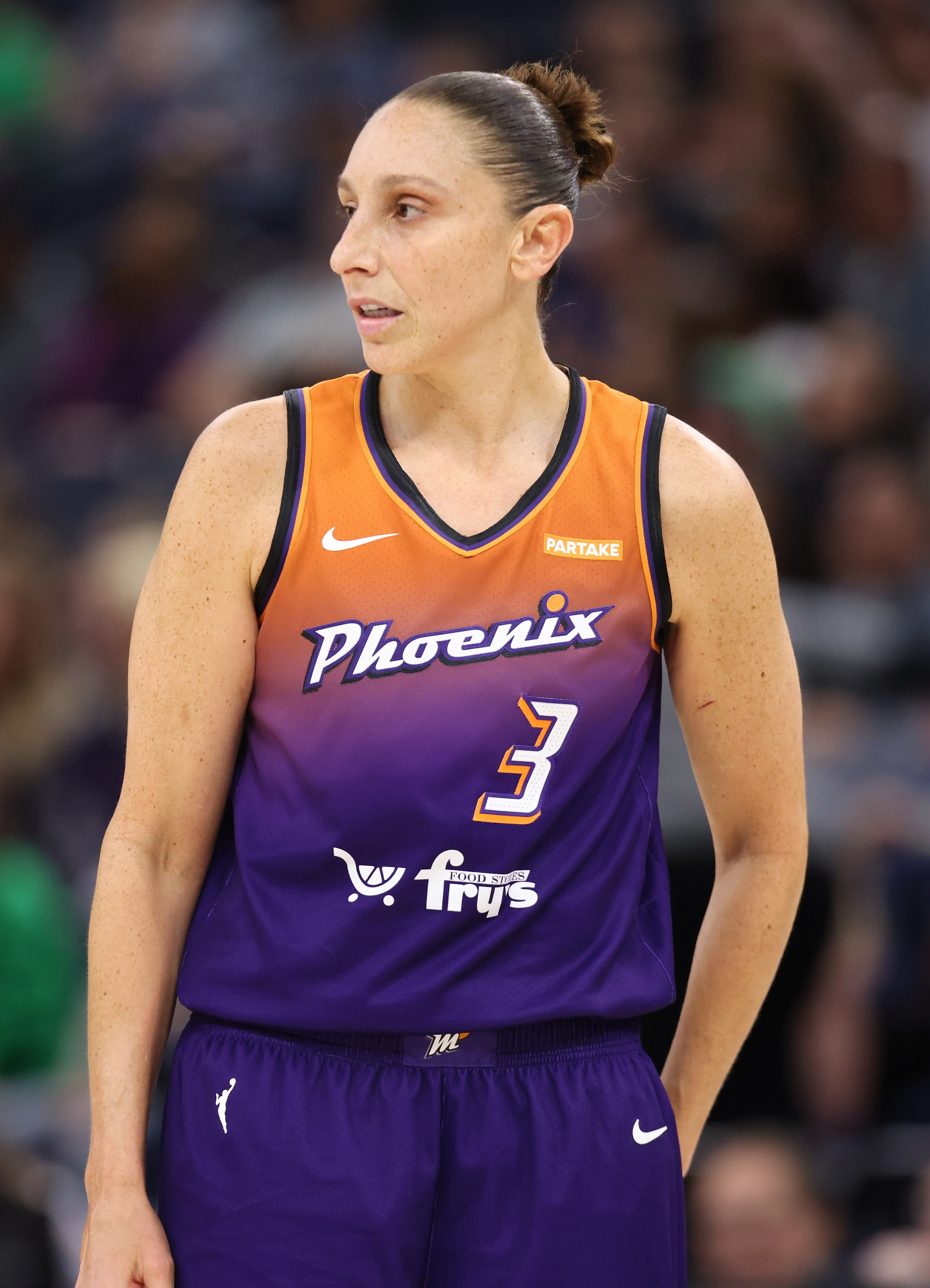
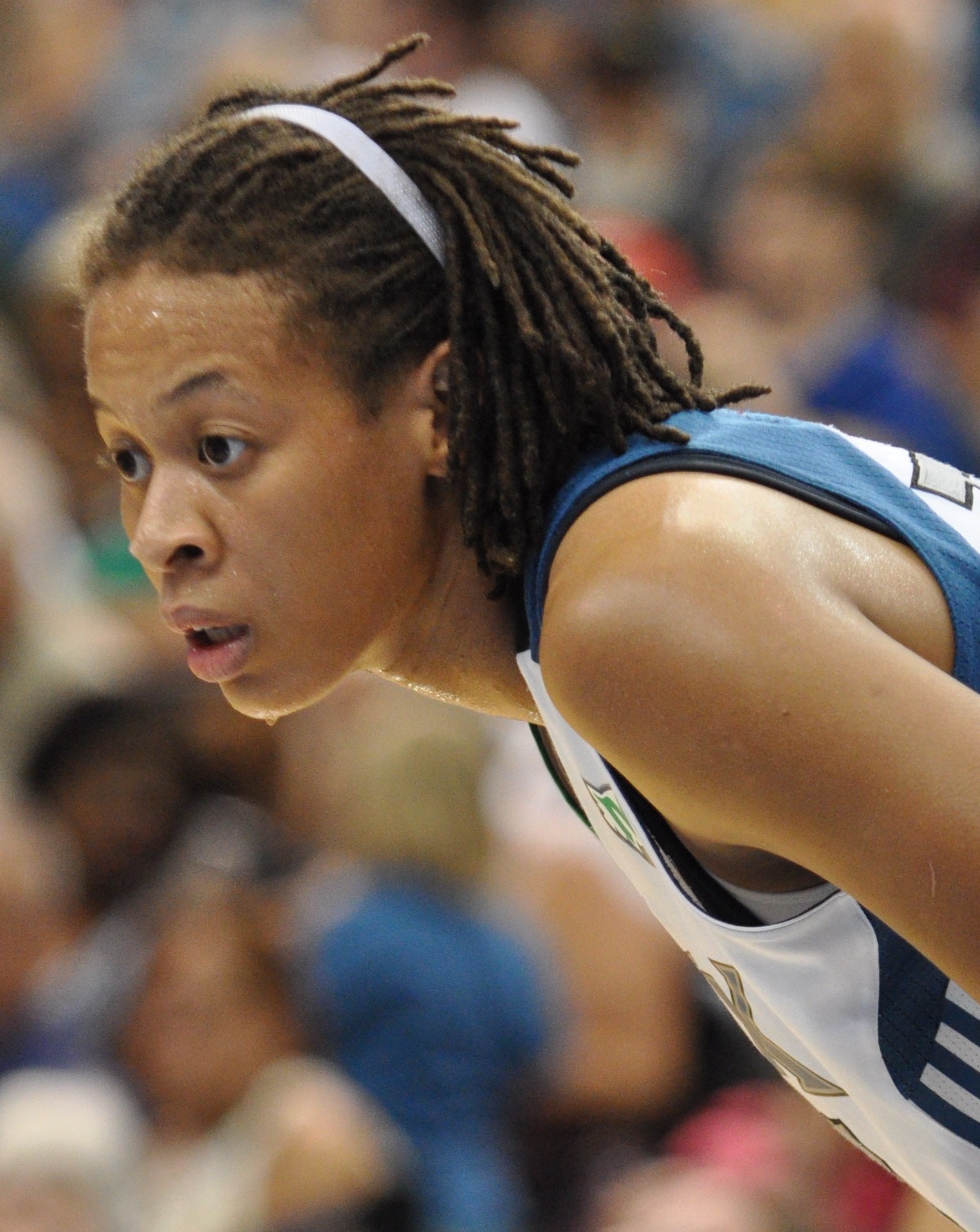
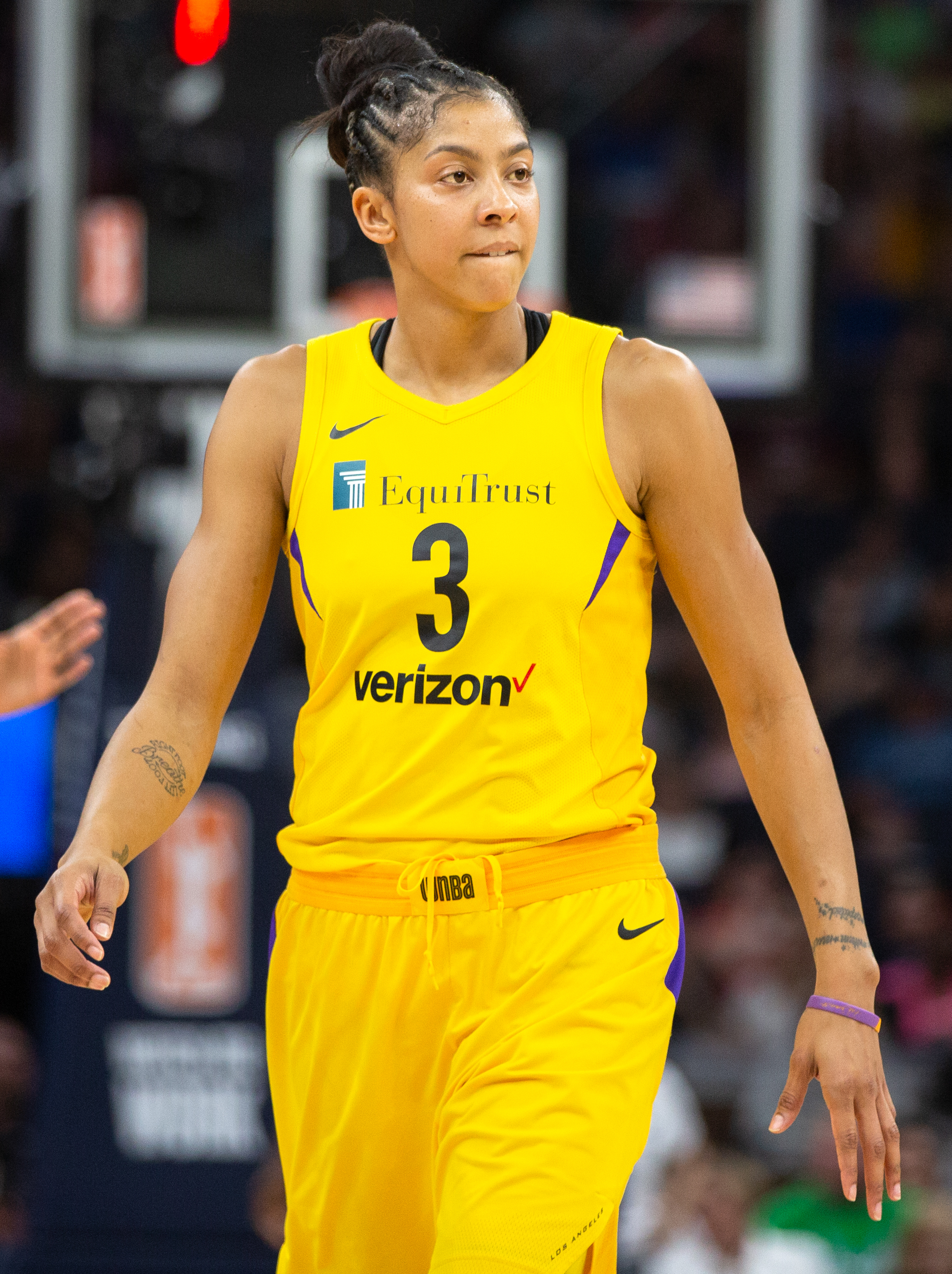
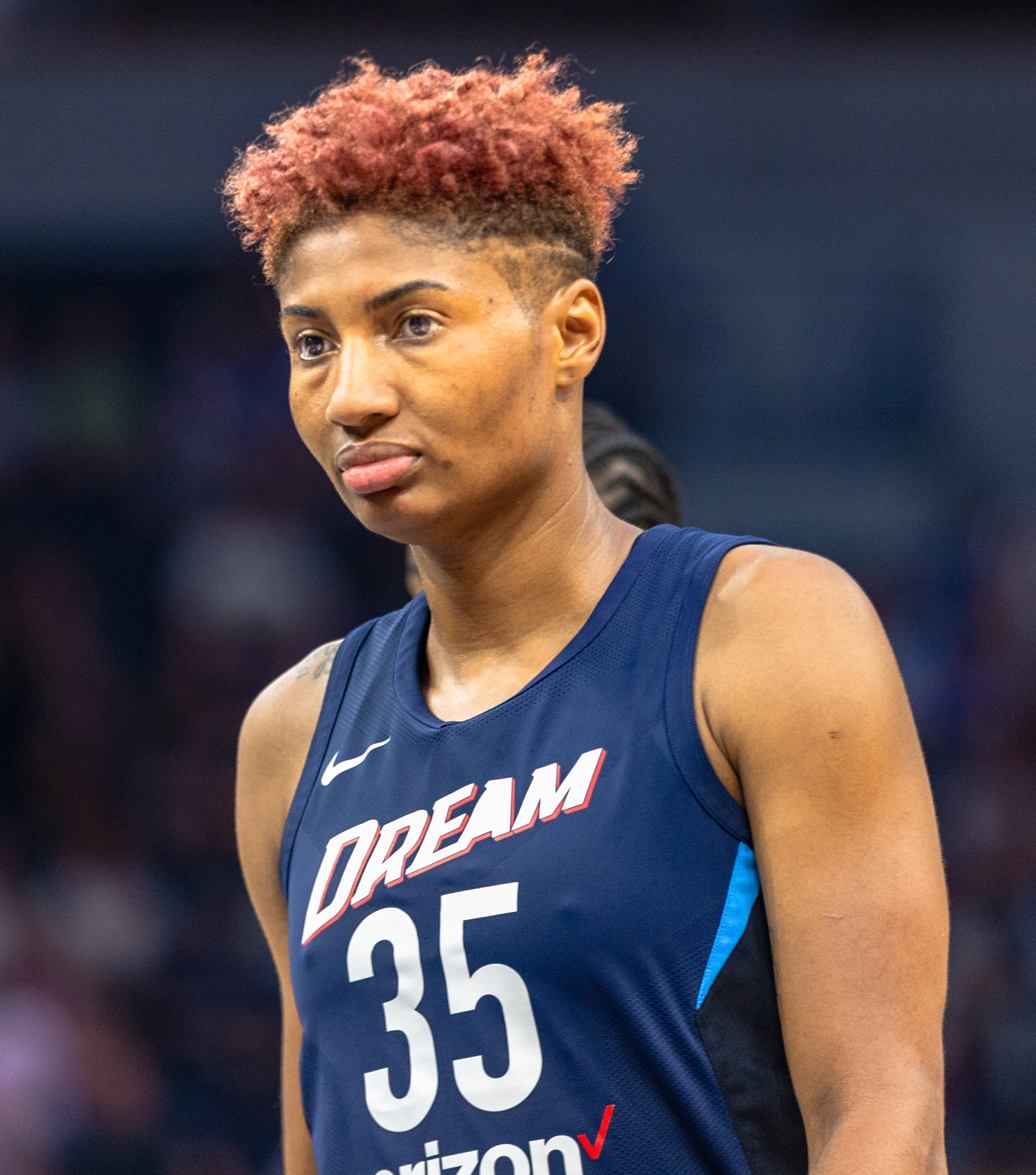
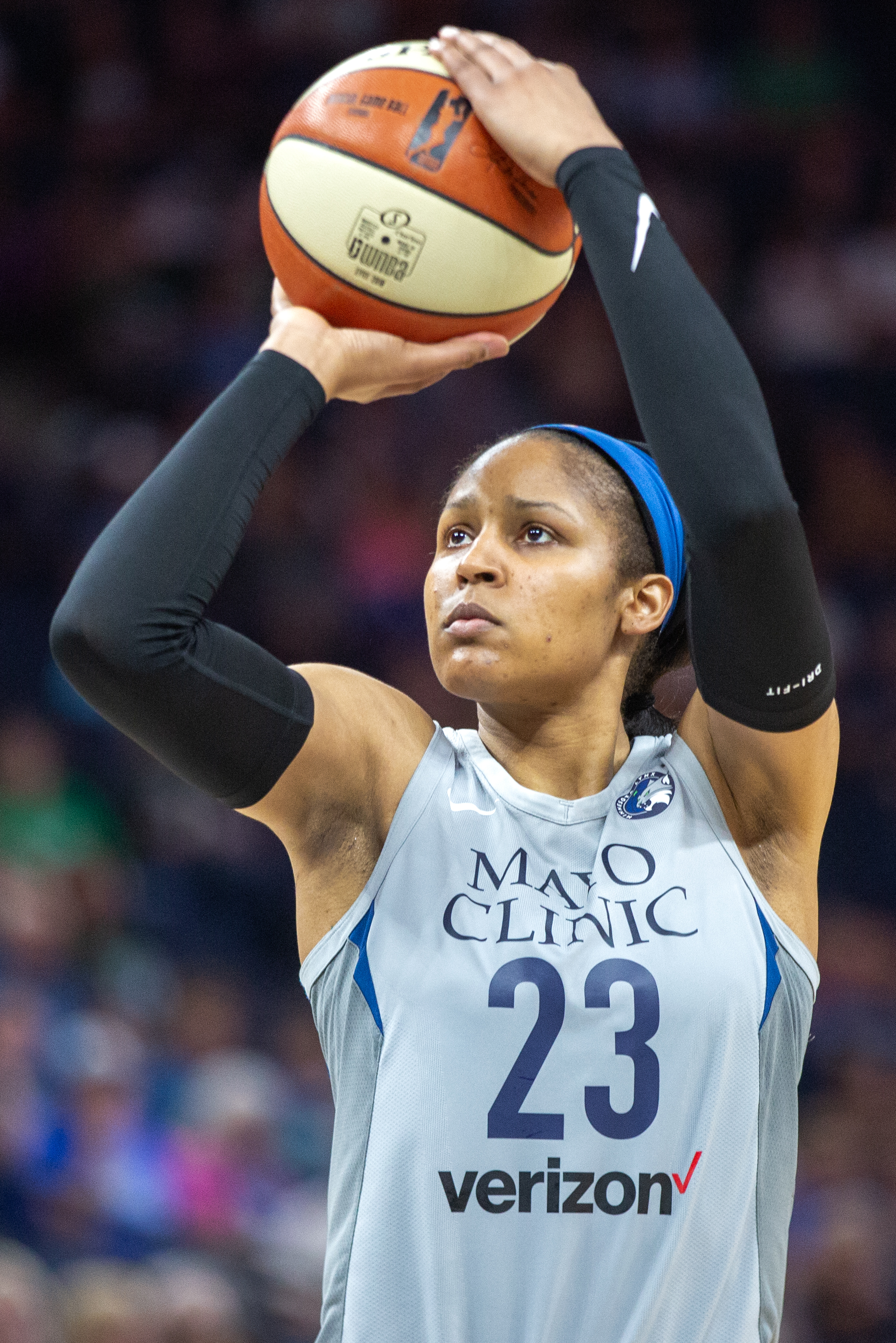
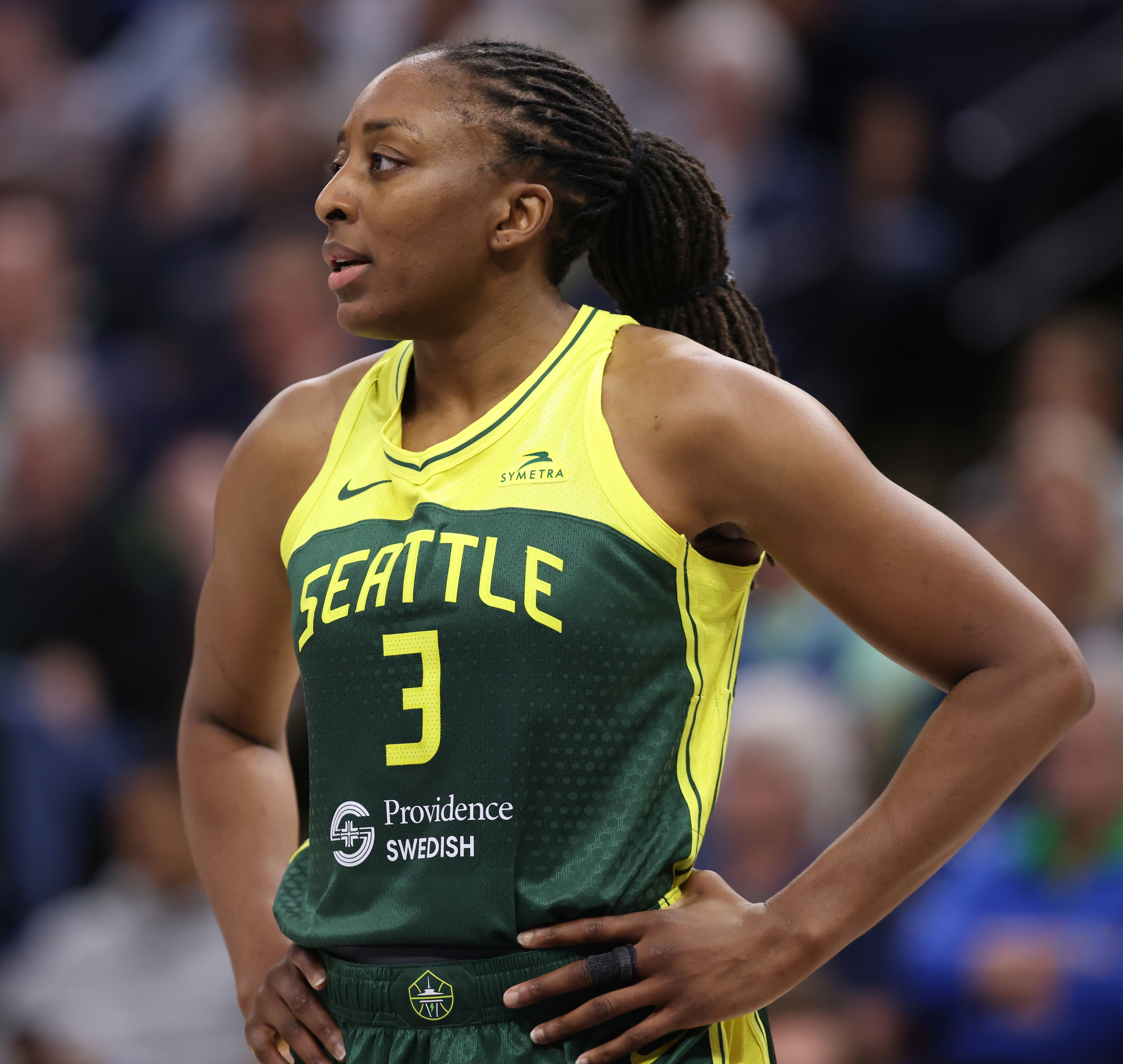
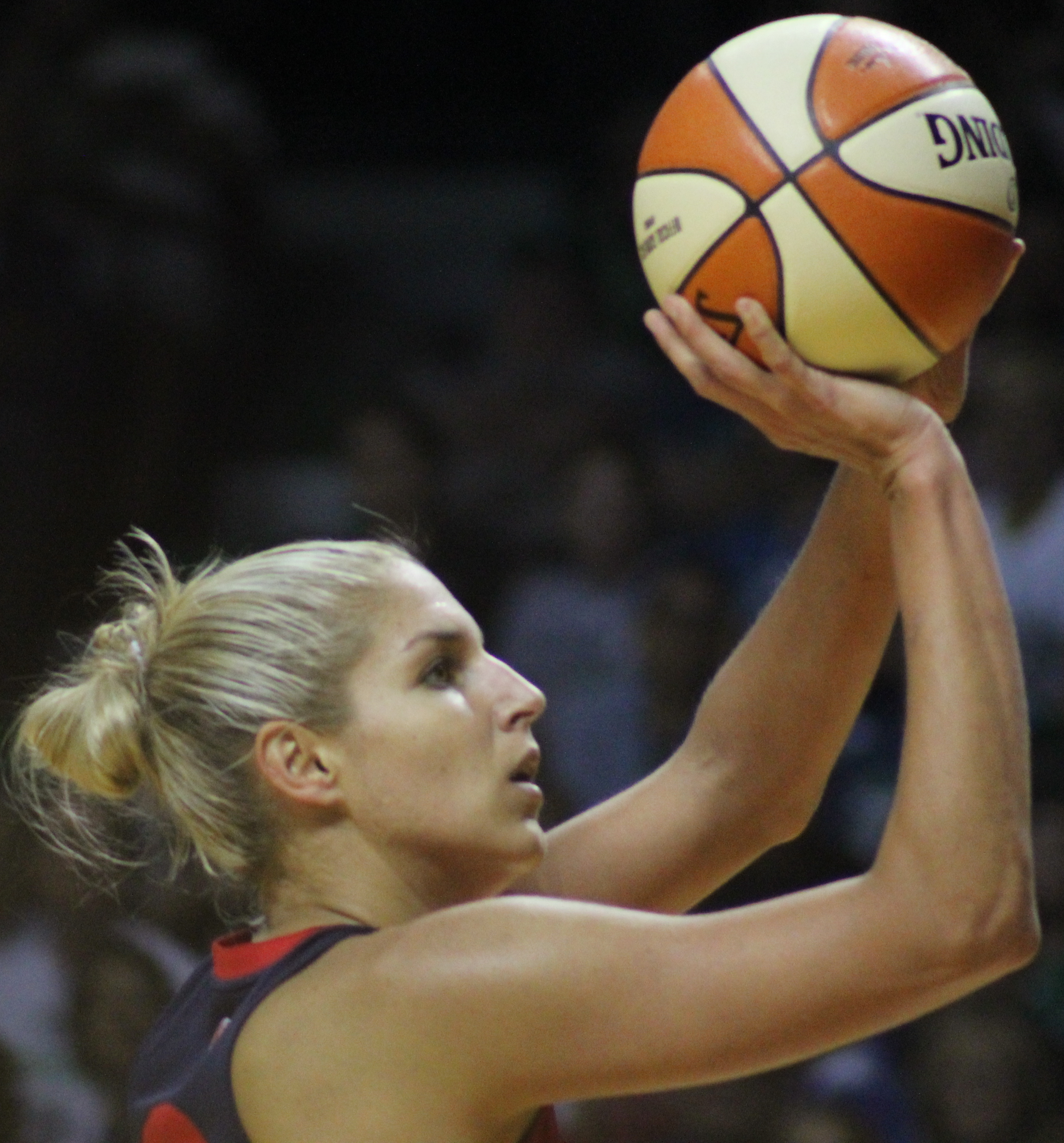
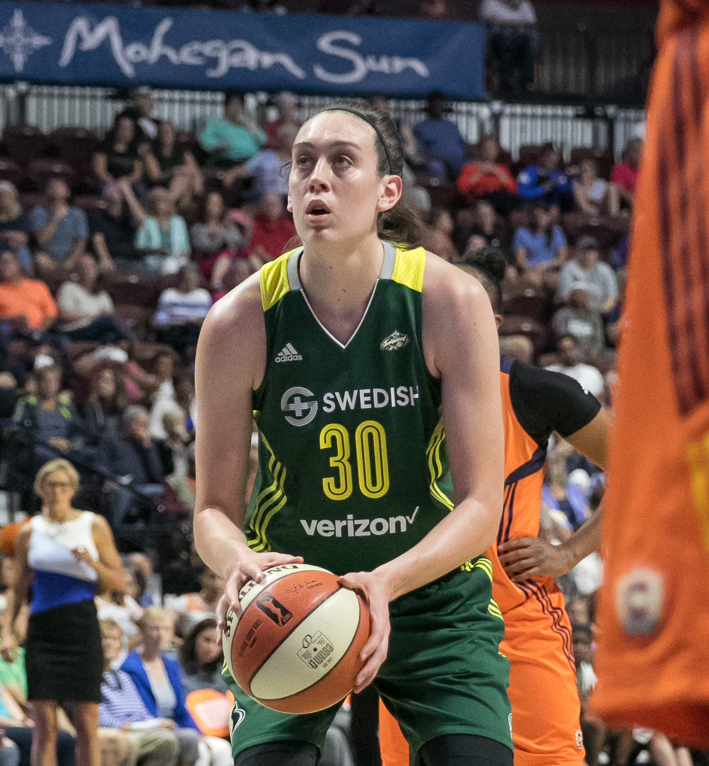
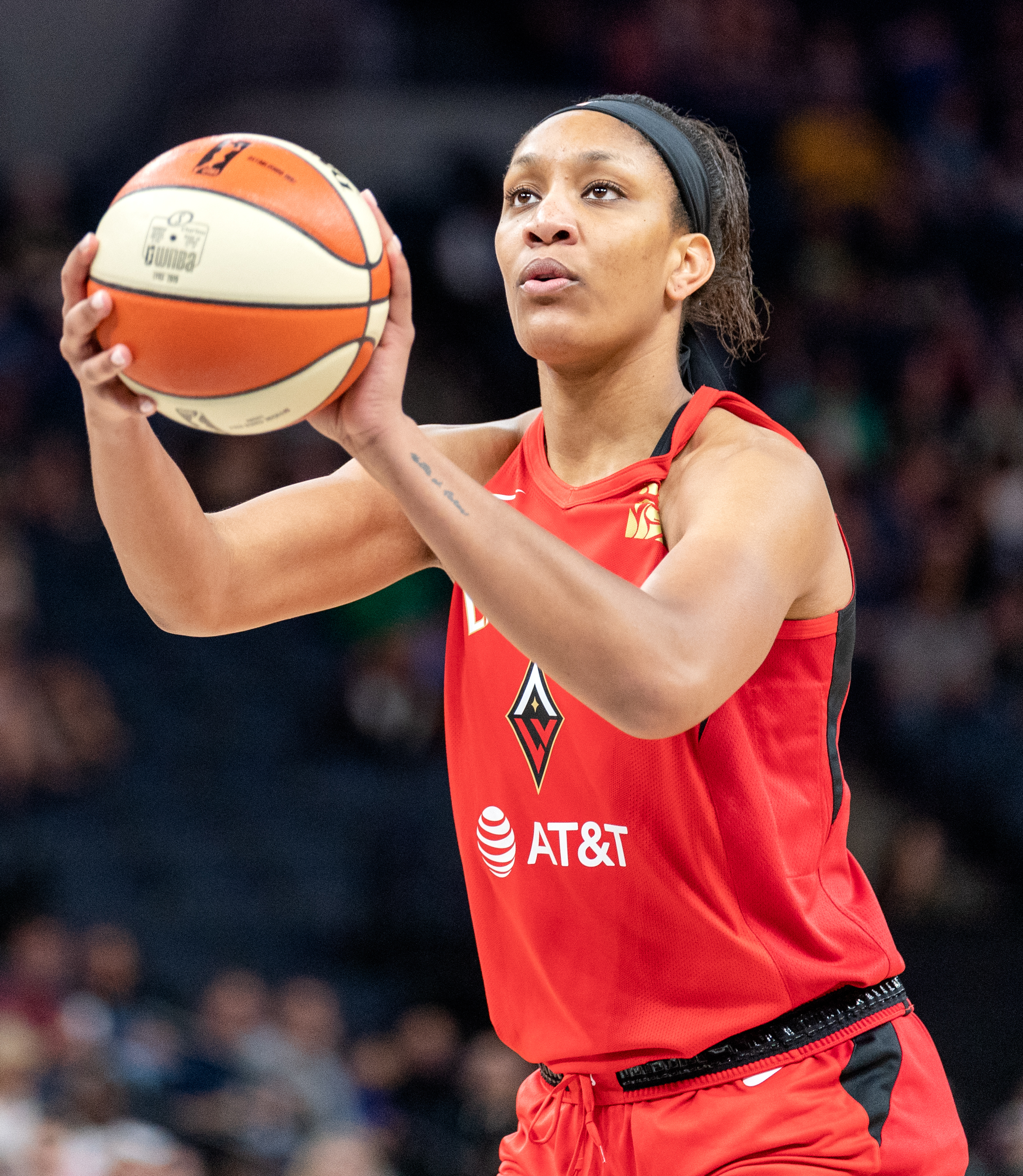
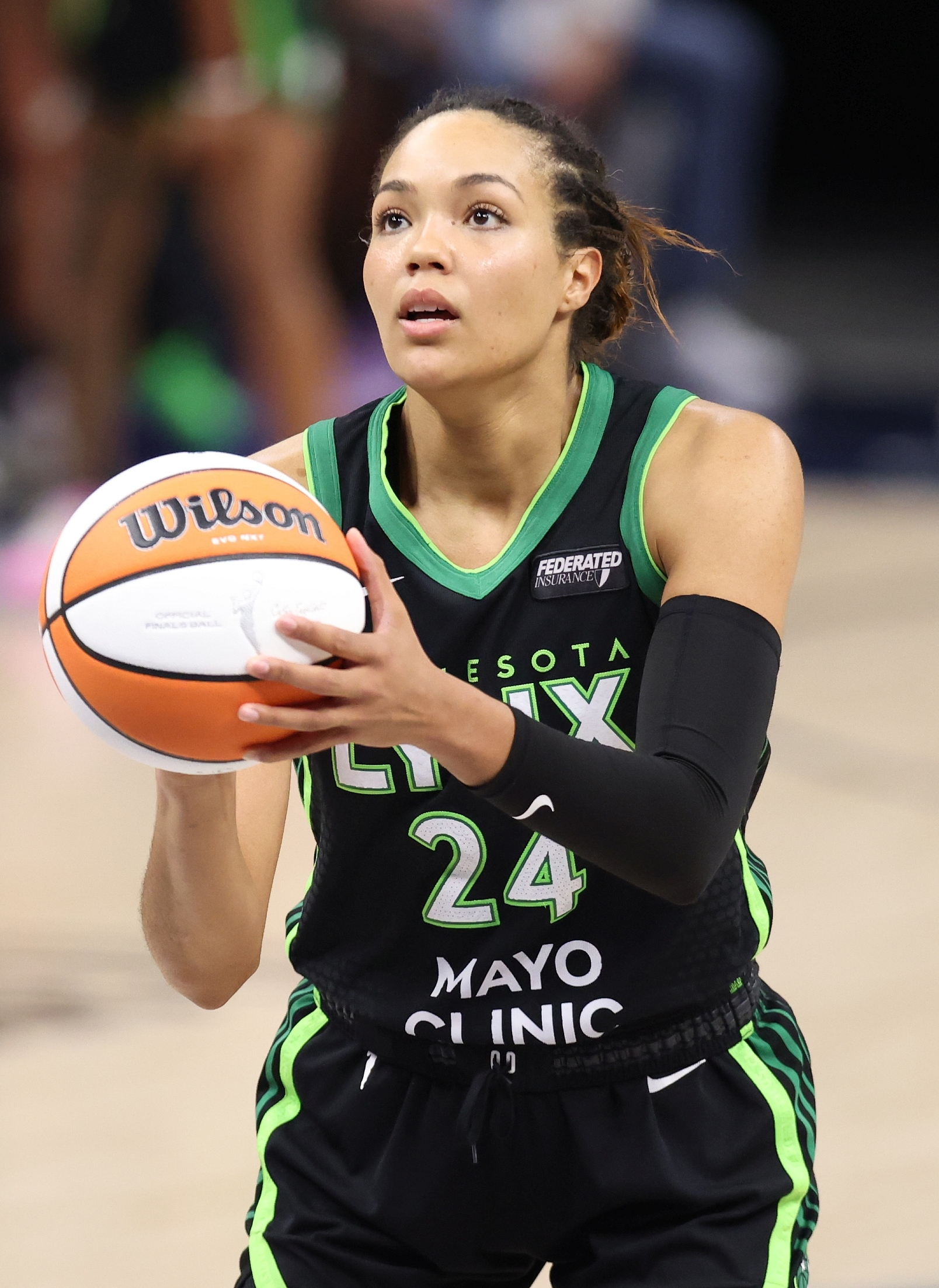
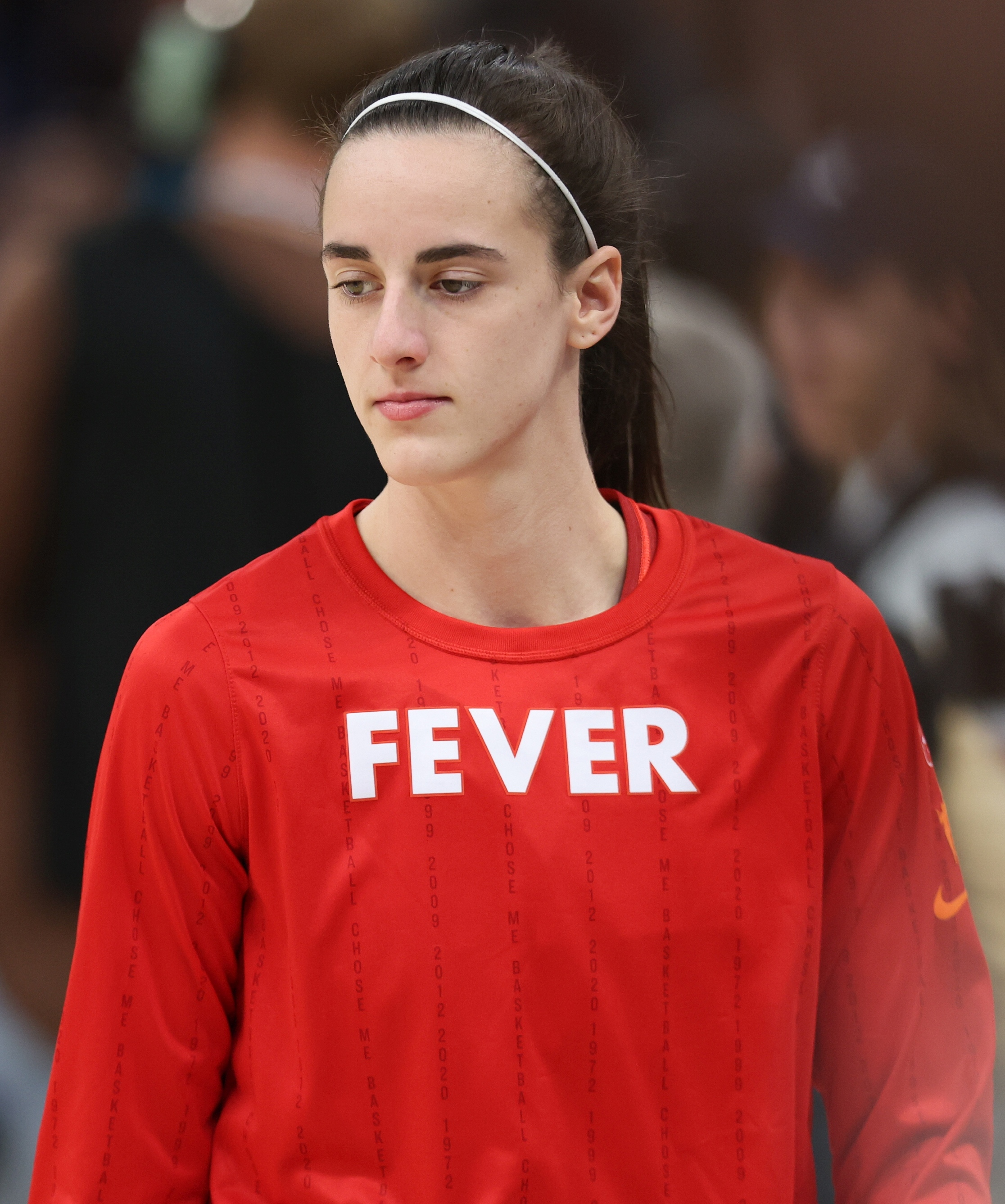
- Top row: (left to right) Tamika Catchings, Diana Taurasi, Seimone Augustus, and Candace Parker
- Middle row: (left to right) Angel McCoughtry, Maya Moore, Nneka Ogwumike, and Elena Delle Donne
- Bottom row: (left to right) Breanna Stewart, A'ja Wilson, Napheesa Collier, and Caitlin Clark

Awards	Teams	Years
5	Minnesota Lynx	2000, 2006, 2011, 2019, 2020
3	Indiana Fever	2002, 2023, 2024
3	Dallas Wings / Tulsa Shock / Detroit Shock	2003 (as Detroit); 2017, 2025 (as Dallas)
2	Washington Mystics	1999, 2005
2	Chicago Sky	2007, 2013
2	Los Angeles Sparks	2008, 2012
2	Atlanta Dream	2009, 2022
2	Connecticut Sun / Orlando Miracle	2010, 2014 (as Connecticut)
2	Seattle Storm	2015, 2016
1	Charlotte Sting	1998
1	Portland Fire	2001
1	Phoenix Mercury	2004
1	Las Vegas Aces / San Antonio Stars / San Antonio Silver Stars / Utah Starzz	2018 (as Las Vegas)
1	New York Liberty	2021
0	Cleveland Rockers	N/A
0	Houston Comets	N/A
0	Miami Sol	N/A
0	Sacramento Monarchs	N/A

== See also ==
- List of sports awards honoring women
