= Jackie Stiles =

American basketball player and coach (born 1978)

Personal information
- Born: December 21, 1978 (age 47) Kansas City, Kansas, U.S.
- Listed height: 5 ft 8 in (1.73 m)
- Listed weight: 144 lb (65 kg)

Career information
- High school: Claflin (Claflin, Kansas)
- College: Missouri State (1997–2001)
- WNBA draft: 2001: 1st round, 4th overall pick
- Drafted by: Portland Fire
- Playing career: 2001–2006
- Position: Shooting guard
- Number: 10
- Coaching career: 2012–present

Career history

Playing
- 2001–2002: Portland Fire
- 2004: Lubbock Hawks
- 2006: Canberra Capitals

Career highlights
- WNBA Rookie of the Year (2001); WNBA All-Star (2001); Wade Trophy (2001); Honda Sports Award (2001); Honda-Broderick Cup (2001); Kodak All-American (2001); 2× All-American – USBWA (2000, 2001); First-team All-American – AP (2001); Second-team All-American – AP (2000); Third-team All-American – AP (1999); 3× MVC Player of the Year (1999–2001); 2× MVC Tournament MVP (2000, 2001); 4× First-team All-MVC (1998–2001); MVC Freshman of the Year (1998); MVC All-Freshman Team (1998); WBCA High School All-America Game MVP (1997); 2× NCAA season scoring leader (2000, 2001); Miss Kansas Basketball (1997)
- Stats at Basketball Reference
- Women's Basketball Hall of Fame
Medals
Women's basketball
Representing United States
FIBA Under-19 World Cup
Gold medal – first place	1997 Brazil	Team
FIBA Under-18 Americas Championship
Silver medal – second place	1996 Mexico	Team
Jones Cup
Gold medal – first place	2000 Taipei	Team competition

Jackie Marie Stiles (born December 21, 1978) is an American college basketball coach who was formerly an assistant coach for the University of Oklahoma women's basketball team and at Missouri State University. Stiles set several scoring records while playing shooting guard in college and was inducted into the Women's Basketball Hall of Fame in 2016.

== High school ==
Born in Kansas City, Kansas and raised in Claflin, Stiles played for Claflin High School, where she was named a WBCA All-American. She participated in the WBCA High School All-America Game where she scored eighteen points and earned MVP honors.

Stiles won 14 individual state titles in track and field, a state record that still stands.

== College ==
Stiles played college basketball at Southwest Missouri State University (now Missouri State University) from 1997 to 2001. While there, she became the first NCAA Division I women's player to score more than 1,000 points in a season, scoring 1,062 in her senior year. That year, she won the Wade Trophy, which honors the best women's basketball player in the college ranks, as well as the Broderick Cup, which honors the Collegiate Woman Athlete of the Year. She competed with USA Basketball as a member of the 2000 Jones Cup Team that won the gold in Taipei, Taiwan.

During her four collegiate years, Stiles scored 3,393 points, a career total that stood as a record for Division I women's basketball until it was broken by Kelsey Plum in 2017. On March 10, 2000, she scored 56 points against Evansville, which stands as the sixth highest number of points in a single Division I game. In her senior season, Stiles scored 41 points to help fifth seed Missouri State upset top seed Duke in the 2001 Sweet 16.

== Career statistics ==
=== WNBA ===
Legend
GP	Games played	GS	Games started	MPG	Minutes per game	RPG	Rebounds per game
APG	Assists per game	SPG	Steals per game	BPG	Blocks per game	PPG	Points per game
TO	Turnovers per game	FG%	Field-goal percentage	3P%	3-point field-goal percentage	FT%	Free-throw percentage
**Bold**	Career best	°	League leader

WNBA regular season statistics
Year	Team	GP	GS	MPG	FG%	3P%	FT%	RPG	APG	SPG	BPG	TO	PPG
2001	Portland	**32**	**32**	**32.0**	**40.5**	**43.1**	77.9	**2.4**	**1.7**	**0.8**	**0.1**	2.1	**14.9**
2002	Portland	21	3	18.2	31.9	34.1	**80.0**	0.9	1.0	0.2	0.0	**1.0**	6.0
**Career**	2 years, 1 team	53	35	26.5	38.3	40.6	78.2	1.8	1.4	0.5	0.1	1.7	11.4
**Career**	All-Star	1	0	20.0	0.0	—	100.0	2.0	0.0	0.0	0.0	0.0	4.0

=== College ===
Legend
GP	Games played	GS	Games started	MPG	Minutes per game	FG%	Field goal percentage	3P%	3-point field goal percentage
FT%	Free throw percentage	RPG	Rebounds per game	APG	Assists per game	SPG	Steals per game	BPG	Blocks per game
TO	Turnovers per game	PPG	Points per game	**Bold**	Career high	*	Led Division I

Year	Team	GP	Points	FG%	3P%	FT%	RPG	APG	SPG	BPG	PPG
1998	Southwest Missouri State†	30	618	.520	.364	.818	3.8	2.5	1.1	0.1	20.6
1999	Southwest Missouri State	32	823	.529	.431	.838	3.4	**2.8**	0.9	0.1	25.7
2000	Southwest Missouri State	32	890	.499	.453	.859	**4.2**	2.0	**1.5**	**0.4**	*27.8
2001	Southwest Missouri State	**35**	**1,062**	**.566**	**.492**	**.887**	3.5	1.9	1.1	0.1	***30.3**
Career		129	3,393	.530	.441	.855	3.7	2.3	1.2	0.2	26.3

†Missouri State since 2005.

== USA Basketball ==
Stiles was named to the USA Basketball Women's Junior National Team (now called the U18 team). The team participated in the third Junior World Championship, held in Chetumal, Mexico in late August and early September 1996. The USA team won their early games easily, but lost by four points to the team from Brazil, ending up with the silver medal for the event.

Stiles was named to the USA Basketball Women's Junior National Team when it was invited to the 1997 FIBA Junior World Championship (now called U19) held in Natal, Brazil. After beating Japan, the next game was against Australia, the defending champion. The USA team pulled out to a 13-point lead in the second half, but gave up the lead and lost the game 80–74. The USA rebounded with a close 92–88 victory over Cuba, helped by 23 points each from Maylana Martin and Lynn Pride. The USA then went on to beat previously unbeaten Russia. After winning the next two games, the USA faced Australia in the gold medal game. The USA team has a three-point lead late, but the Aussies hit a three-pointer with three seconds left in regulation to force overtime. Although the Aussies scored first, the USA team came back, then pulled into the lead and held on to win 78–74 to earn the gold, and the first medal for a USA team at a Junior World Championship. Stiles averaged 1.0 point per game.

Stiles was named to the team representing the US in 2000 at the William Jones Cup competition in Taipei, Taiwan. The USA team started strong with a 32-point win over the host team, the Republic of China National Team. They then beat South Korea easily and faced Japan in the third game. Japan started out strongly, and had an 18-point lead in the first half. The USA then out scored Japan 23–3 to take a small lead at the half. The USA built a ten-point lead, but Japan cut it back to three with under a minute to go. Kelly Schumacher grabbed an offensive rebound and scored to bring the lead back to five points and the team held on for the win. The USA team beat Japan 83–80. The final game was against Malaysia, but it wasn't close, with the USA winning 79–24, to secure a 4–0 record for the competition and the gold medal. Stiles averaged 6.8 points per game.

== Professional playing career ==
Stiles' pro career started promisingly. In the 2001 WNBA draft, she was selected fourth overall by the Portland Fire, and was later voted the Rookie of the Year. Later in her WNBA career, Stiles suffered numerous injuries, resulting in 13 surgeries.

After the Fire folded in 2002, Stiles was selected 14th by the Los Angeles Sparks, but did not play that season, spending rehabilitation time for her injuries.

In 2004, Stiles signed with the Lubbock Hawks (in Lubbock, Texas) of the National Women's Basketball League (NWBL). After a season, Stiles took on competitive cycling.

In 2006, Stiles played briefly for the Canberra Capitals of the Women's National Basketball League in Australia before retiring due to injury.

After retiring from playing professional basketball, Stiles founded J. Stiles Total Training in 2007.

== Coaching career ==
In August, 2012, she accepted a women's basketball assistant coach position with Loyola Marymount University in Los Angeles, California. On April 18, 2013, it was announced that Stiles would be returning to her alma mater as assistant coach for the Lady Bears women's basketball team. On April 24, 2019, it was announced that Stiles was hired as an assistant coach for the University of Oklahoma's women's basketball team. Stiles was hired at Tulsa in late April 2021 joining new Golden Hurricane head coach Angie Nelp's inaugural staff. It was reported on June 21, 2021 that Stiles stepped down from the Tulsa staff.

== Awards and honors ==
Stiles was the 2001 winner of the Wade Trophy, Honda Sports Award for basketball, and the overall Honda-Broderick Cup winner for all sports.

She was one of 11 honorees inducted into the Kansas Sports Hall of Fame in the Class of 2007. She was also inducted into the Women's Basketball Hall of Fame (Class of 2016) on June 11, 2016.

== See also ==
- List of NCAA Division I women's basketball career scoring leaders
- List of NCAA Division I women's basketball season scoring leaders
