= Linda Hargrove (basketball) =

American basketball coach

Linda Hargrove (née Adams; born April 2, 1950) is an American retired basketball coach. Hargrove began coaching the women's basketball team at Cowley College from 1972 to 1989 before coaching the Wichita State Shockers women's basketball team from 1989 to 1998. As a college basketball coach, Hargrove had 429 wins and 248 losses between the 1970s and 1990s. In 1998, Hargrove went to the American Basketball League to coach the Colorado Xplosion for a year until the league closed. From 2000 to 2002, Hargrove had 37 wins and 59 losses as the head coach and general manager of the Portland Fire.

After the Fire disbanded in 2002, Hargrove remained in the Women's National Basketball Association when she joined the Washington Mystics in 2003. Hargrove started as a scout for the Mystics before being named assistant coach in 2004 and general manager in 2005. Hargrove remained as the Mystics' general manager until her initial retirement in 2008. Apart from the WNBA, Hargrove was an assistant coach for the United States women's national basketball team that won a medal at the 1990 FIBA World Championship for Women and 1992 Summer Olympics.

== Early life and education ==
Hargrove was born in Great Bend, Kansas on April 2, 1950. During high school, Hargrove competed in track and field and set a record in hurdles for her school. For her post-secondary education, Hargrove received a Bachelor of Science from Southwestern College in 1975. In 1985, she graduated from Wichita State with a master's degree and specialized in education.

== Career ==
Between 1972 and 1989, Hargrove had 316 wins and 112 losses while coaching the women's basketball team at Cowley College. For the first fifteen years of her position, Hargrove was also Crowley's volleyball team, where she had 305 wins, 114 losses and 8 ties. Other Cowley sports teams that Hargrove coached for during the 1970s were the track and field team for five years and the softball team for two years. From 1989 to 1998, Hargrove was the Wichita State Shockers women's basketball coach. During these years, Hargrove had 113 wins and 136 losses.

While working at Wichita State, Hargrove drafted players for the Long Beach StingRays in 1997. In 1998, Hargrove became the head coach of the Colorado Xplosion and held the position until the American Basketball League closed that same year. From 2000 to 2002, Hargrove was the head coach and general manager of the Portland Fire. During her WNBA coaching tenure, Hargrove had 37 wins and 59 losses. After the Fire disbanded in 2002, Hargrove joined the Washington Mystics as a scout in 2003. The following year, Hargrove was selected as an assistant coach for the Mystics in 2004.

After working as the Mystics general manager from 2005 to 2008, Hargrove retired from basketball in 2008. While working in house renovations, Hargrove returned to basketball in 2017 after becoming an interim head coach for the Wichita State women's basketball team. Hargrove remained at Wichita State for two months before she resumed her retirement in 2018. Outside of college sports, Hargrove was an assistant coach for the United States women's national basketball team between 1989 and 1992. During this time period, Hargrove was part of the team that won gold at the 1990 FIBA World Championship for Women and bronze at the 1992 Summer Olympics.

== Head coaching record ==
Legend
Regular season	G	Games coached	W	Games won	L	Games lost	W–L %	Win–loss %
Playoffs	PG	Playoff games	PW	Playoff wins	PL	Playoff losses	PW–L %	Playoff win–loss %

=== WNBA ===
Team	Year	G	W	L	W–L%	Finish	PG	PW	PL	PW–L%	Result
Portland	2000	32	10	22	.313	7th in West	—	—	—	—	Missed playoffs
Portland	2001	32	11	21	.344	7th in West	—	—	—	—	Missed playoffs
Portland	2002	32	16	16	.500	5th in West	—	—	—	—	Missed playoffs
Career		96	37	59	.385		—	—	—	—	

== Awards and honors ==
Hargrove was awarded the 1987 WBCA National Coach of the Year Award in the Two-Year College category. She was the Women's Basketball Coach of the Year for the Missouri Valley Conference during 1993. Hargrove was inducted into the Kansas Sports Hall of Fame in 2007.

== Personal life ==
Hargrove is married and has two children.
