= Tasha Pointer =

American basketball coach

Kean Cougars
- Title: Head coach
- League: New Jersey Athletic Conference

Personal information
- Born: June 27, 1979 (age 47) Chicago, Illinois
- Listed height: 5 ft 6 in (1.68 m)

Career information
- High school: Whitney Young (Chicago, Illinois)
- College: Rutgers (1997–2001)
- WNBA draft: 2001: 4th round, 52nd overall pick
- Drafted by: Portland Fire
- Playing career: 2001–2004
- Position: Point guard / shooting guard
- Number: 12
- Coaching career: 2004–present

Career history

Playing
- 2004: Chicago Blaze

Coaching
- 2004–2006: Columbia (assistant)
- 2006–2007: Xavier (assistant)
- 2007–2015: Rutgers (assistant)
- 2015–2017: St. John's (assistant)
- 2017–2018: Northwestern (assistant)
- 2018–2022: UIC
- 2022–2025: Rutgers (assistant)
- 2026–present: Kean

Career highlights
- 2× Second-team All-Big East (1998, 2000); Big East Rookie of the Year (1998)
- Stats at Basketball Reference

Natasha Pointer (born June 27, 1979) is an American basketball coach and former player who is currently the head women's basketball coach at Kean University. She was drafted in the fourth round of the 2001 WNBA draft by the Portland Fire with the 52nd overall pick.

== Playing career ==
Pointer played college basketball at Rutgers, where she was a four-year starter as a point guard. At Rutgers, she was the first person in the history of the Big East Conference to record more than 1,000 points, 700 assists, 500 rebounds, and 250 steals as well as the first player to record a triple-double in the history of Rutgers women's basketball.

Pointer was drafted by the Portland Fire with the 52nd overall pick in the 2001 WNBA draft, but did not make the final roster. She was later selected by the Chicago Blaze in the third round of the National Women's Basketball League draft in 2004 and played two games with them. Pointer was later signed by the New York Liberty but was waived a month later.

=== Rutgers statistics ===
Ratios
Year	Team	GP	FG%	3P%	FT%	RBG	APG	BPG	SPG	PPG
1997-98	Rutgers	32	47.1%	20.5%	63.8%	4.219	5.594	0.000	3.063	14.000
1998-99	Rutgers	33	44.8%	25.8%	70.7%	3.600	6.848	0.091	2.000	10.300
1999-00	Rutgers	32	46.8%	36.6%	68.2%	4.625	5.531	0.063	1.906	9.688
2000-01	Rutgers	31	46.9%	20.8%	67.3%	6.000	8.300	0.000	2.200	11.500
Career		128	46.5%	24.7%	67.2%	4.586	6.555	0.047	2.281	11.375

Totals
Year	Team	GP	FG	FGA	3P	3PA	FT	FTA	REB	A	BK	ST	PTS
1997-98	Rutgers	32	160	340	15	73	113	177	135	179	0	98	448
1998-99	Rutgers	33	117	261	8	31	99	140	118	226	3	66	341
1999-00	Rutgers	32	111	237	15	41	73	107	148	177	2	61	310
2000-01	Rutgers	31	137	292	11	53	72	107	186	257	1	67	357
Career		128	525	1130	49	198	357	531	587	839	6	292	1456

== Coaching career ==
Pointer began her coaching career at Columbia as an assistant coach in 2004. She was also an assistant at Xavier for one season before joining her alma mater Rutgers as an assistant coach. She spent eight seasons with the Scarlet Knights helping them rebuild themselves into contenders before joining St. John's in 2015 as an assistant coach. Pointer left St. John's after two seasons to join Northwestern as an assistant coach.

Pointer was named the head coach at UIC in 2018. It was announced that Pointer would not return after the 2021–22 season.

Pointer was hired as an assistant coach at Rutgers in 2022. She was named the head coach at Kean University prior to the 2025–26 season.

== Head coaching record ==
Record table
Season	Team	Overall	Conference	Standing	Postseason
UIC Flames (Horizon League) (2018–2022)
2018–19	UIC	3–26	1–17		
2019–20	UIC	3–27	2–16		
2020–21	UIC	3–16	1–13		
UIC:		9–69 (.115)	4–46 (.080)		
Kean Cougars (New Jersey Athletic Conference) (2026–present)
2025–26	Kean	2–20	2–16	9th	
Kean:		2–20 (.091)	2–16 (.111)		
Total:		11–89 (.110)			
National champion Postseason invitational champion Conference regular season champion Conference regular season and conference tournament champion Division regular season champion Division regular season and conference tournament champion Conference tournament champion
