= Lynn Pride =

American basketball player (born 1978)

Personal information
- Born: October 16, 1978 (age 48) Vero Beach, Florida, U.S.
- Listed height: 6 ft 2 in (1.88 m)
- Listed weight: 180 lb (82 kg)

Career information
- High school: Sam Houston (Arlington, Texas)
- College: Kansas (1996–2000)
- WNBA draft: 2000: 1st round, 7th overall pick
- Drafted by: Portland Fire
- Playing career: 2000–2003
- Position: Guard / forward
- Number: 34

Career history
- 2000: Portland Fire
- 2001–2003: Minnesota Lynx
- 2003: Los Angeles Sparks

Career highlights
- 3× First-team All-Big 12 (1998–2000)

Career WNBA statistics
- Points: 425 (3.8 ppg)
- Rebounds: 333 (3.0 rpg)
- Assists: 112 (1.0 apg)
- Stats at Basketball Reference
Medals
Women's basketball
Representing United States
Pan American Games
Bronze medal – third place	1999 Winnipeg	Team
FIBA Under-19 World Cup
Gold medal – first place	1997 Brazil	Team
FIBA Under-18 Americas Championship
Silver medal – second place	1996 Mexico	Team
Jones Cup
Gold medal – first place	1998 Taipei	Team competition

Lynn Pride (born October 16, 1978) is an American former collegiate and professional basketball player.

Born in Vero Beach, Florida, she attended Sam Houston High School in Arlington, Texas, and during her senior year, she was ranked as one of the nation's top five players by Blue Star Report and was named an All-American by USA Today, Street & Smith's, and Parade Magazine. Pride was named a High School All-American by the WBCA. She participated in the WBCA High School All-America Game in 1996. Pride attended college at University of Kansas and graduated in 2000.

In the 2000 WNBA draft, Pride was selected in the seventh overall pick by the Portland Fire. After the season, she was traded to the Minnesota Lynx and she played for the Lynx during the 2001, 2002, and part of the 2003 seasons. After being waived by the Lynx, she signed with the Los Angeles Sparks for the rest of the 2003 season before retiring.

== Kansas statistics ==
Legend
GP	Games played	GS	Games started	MPG	Minutes per game
FG%	Field goal percentage	3P%	3-point field goal percentage	FT%	Free throw percentage
RPG	Rebounds per game	APG	Assists per game	SPG	Steals per game
BPG	Blocks per game	PPG	Points per game	**Bold**	Career high

Year	Team	GP	Points	FG%	3P%	FT%	RPG	APG	SPG	BPG	PPG
1996-97	Kansas	27	211	**46.3%**	**42.9%**	68.8%	6.4	1.4	1.8	0.7	7.8
1997-98	Kansas	32	478	39.7%	31.4%	69.8%	6.7	**2.8**	2.2	**0.9**	14.9
1998-99	Kansas	**33**	**563**	44.6%	28.3%	73.3%	7.2	2.5	**2.6**	0.7	17.1
1999-2000	Kansas	30	522	44.4%	26.3%	**78.6%**	**7.9**	2.8	2.5	0.7	**17.4**
Career		122	1774	43.3%	29.8%	73.1%	7.1	2.4	2.3	0.8	14.5

== USA Basketball ==
Pride was named to the USA Basketball Women's Junior National Team (now called the U18 team). The team participated in the third Junior World Championship, held in Chetumal, Mexico in late August and early September 1996. The USA team won their early games easily, but lost by four points to the team from Brazil, ending up with the silver medal for the event.

Pride was named to the USA Basketball Women's Junior National Team when it was invited to the 1997 FIBA Junior World Championship (now called U19) held in Natal, Brazil. After beating Japan, the next game was against Australia, the defending champion. The USA team pulled out to a 13-point lead in the second half, but gave up the lead and lost the game 80–74. The USA rebounded with a close 92–88 victory over Cuba, helped by 23 points each from Maylana Martin and Pride. The USA then went on to beat previously unbeaten Russia. After winning the next two games, the USA faced Australia in the gold medal game. The USA team has a three-point lead late, but the Aussies hit a three-pointer with three seconds left in regulation to force overtime. Although the Aussies scored first, the USA team came back, then pulled into the lead and held on to win 78–74 to earn the gold, and the first medal for a USA team at a Junior World Championship. Pride averaged 10.4 points per game and led the teams in steals with 21.

Pride was named to the team representing the USA at the 1998 William Jones Cup competition in Taipei, Taiwan. The USA team, coached by Nell Fortner, won all five games, earning the gold medal for the competition. Pride averaged 9.0 points per game and led the team in steals with 11.

Pride again played with the USA team at the 1999 Pan American Games. The team finished with a record of 4–3, but won the bronze medal with an 85–59 victory over Brazil. Pride averaged 12.9 points per game and was second on the team in steals with 11.

== WNBA career statistics ==
Legend
GP	Games played	GS	Games started	MPG	Minutes per game	RPG	Rebounds per game
APG	Assists per game	SPG	Steals per game	BPG	Blocks per game	PPG	Points per game
TO	Turnovers per game	FG%	Field-goal percentage	3P%	3-point field-goal percentage	FT%	Free-throw percentage
**Bold**	Career best	°	League leader

=== Regular season ===
Year	Team	GP	GS	MPG	FG%	3P%	FT%	RPG	APG	SPG	BPG	TO	PPG
2000	Portland	**32**	1	14.4	.347	**.333**	**.690**	1.9	1.3	0.5	0.3	1.0	3.6
2001	Minnesota	**32**	14	**22.3**	**.391**	.250	.600	**4.6**	0.9	**0.9**	0.6	1.4	**5.3**
2002	Minnesota	31	**15**	19.0	.385	.100	.471	3.3	**1.4**	0.8	**0.8**	1.5	4.0
2003*	Minnesota	13	0	5.1	.500	.000	.750	1.3	0.1	0.2	0.1	0.6	1.3
2003*	Los Angeles	4	0	7.0	.000	.000	.250	1.5	0.0	0.0	0.0	0.8	0.3
Career	4 years, 3 teams	112	30	16.6	.377	.217	.607	3.0	1.0	0.6	0.5	1.2	3.8

=== Playoffs ===
Year	Team	GP	GS	MPG	FG%	3P%	FT%	RPG	APG	SPG	BPG	TO	PPG
2003	Los Angeles	6	0	6.0	.333	.000	1.000	1.5	0.2	0.3	0.2	0.5	0.8
Career	1 years, 1 team	6	0	6.0	.333	.000	1.000	1.5	0.2	0.3	0.2	0.5	0.8
