= Colorado Xplosion =

1990s American women's basketball franchise

- Sport: Basketball
- Founded: 1996
- Folded: 1998
- League: American Basketball League (ABL)
- Arena: McNichols Sports Arena, Denver Coliseum
- Colors: Navy and Gold
- Head coach: Sheryl Estes (1996–1997); Linda Hargrove (1998)
- General manager: Lark Birdsong (1996–1998); John Nillen (1998)
- Championships: 1 Conference Title

The Colorado Xplosion was the first women's professional basketball franchise in Colorado, an American Basketball League (ABL) team based in Denver. Playing from 1996 through 1998, the team produced many memorable moments for Colorado sports fans and followers of women's professional basketball in general.

Team highlights include winning the Western Conference title in 1997, Edna Campbell being voted on to the 1997 All-Star Team, Crystal Robinson being the inaugural ABL Rookie of the Year, Debbie Black being the league's first Defensive Player of the Year, and Sylvia Crawley winning the 1998 Slam Dunk Contest at the ABL All-Star Game with a blindfolded dunk. Black made pro basketball history on December 8, 1996 when she became the first woman and only the second player ever to record a Quadruple Double, with 10 points, 14 rebounds, 12 assists and 10 steals against Atlanta. Players for the Xplosion included Edna Campbell, Crystal Robinson, Debbie Black, Sylvia Crawley, Nekeshia Henderson, Tari Phillips, and Vonda Ward.

After the franchise ceased operations with the abrupt demise of the ABL in the 1998–99 season, Xplosion players went on to continue their careers in the WNBA.

== Team record ==
| Season | W | L | Win % | Result |
|---|---|---|---|---|
| 1996–97 | 25 | 15 | .625 | Western Conference Champions |
| 1997–98 | 20 | 23 | .465 | 4th place, Western Conference |
| 1998 | 5 | 8 | .385 | 4th place, Western Conference |

== All-Star players ==
- Edna Campbell (ABL All-Star 1997)
- Crystal Robinson (ABL 2nd Team 1997)
- Debbie Black (ABL 2nd Team 1997, ABL All-Star 1997–1998)
- Missy Masley

== League honors ==
All-Star Edna Campbell (1997)

Rookie of the Year Crystal Robinson (1997)

Defensive Player of the Year Debbie Black (1997)
