= Powers High School =

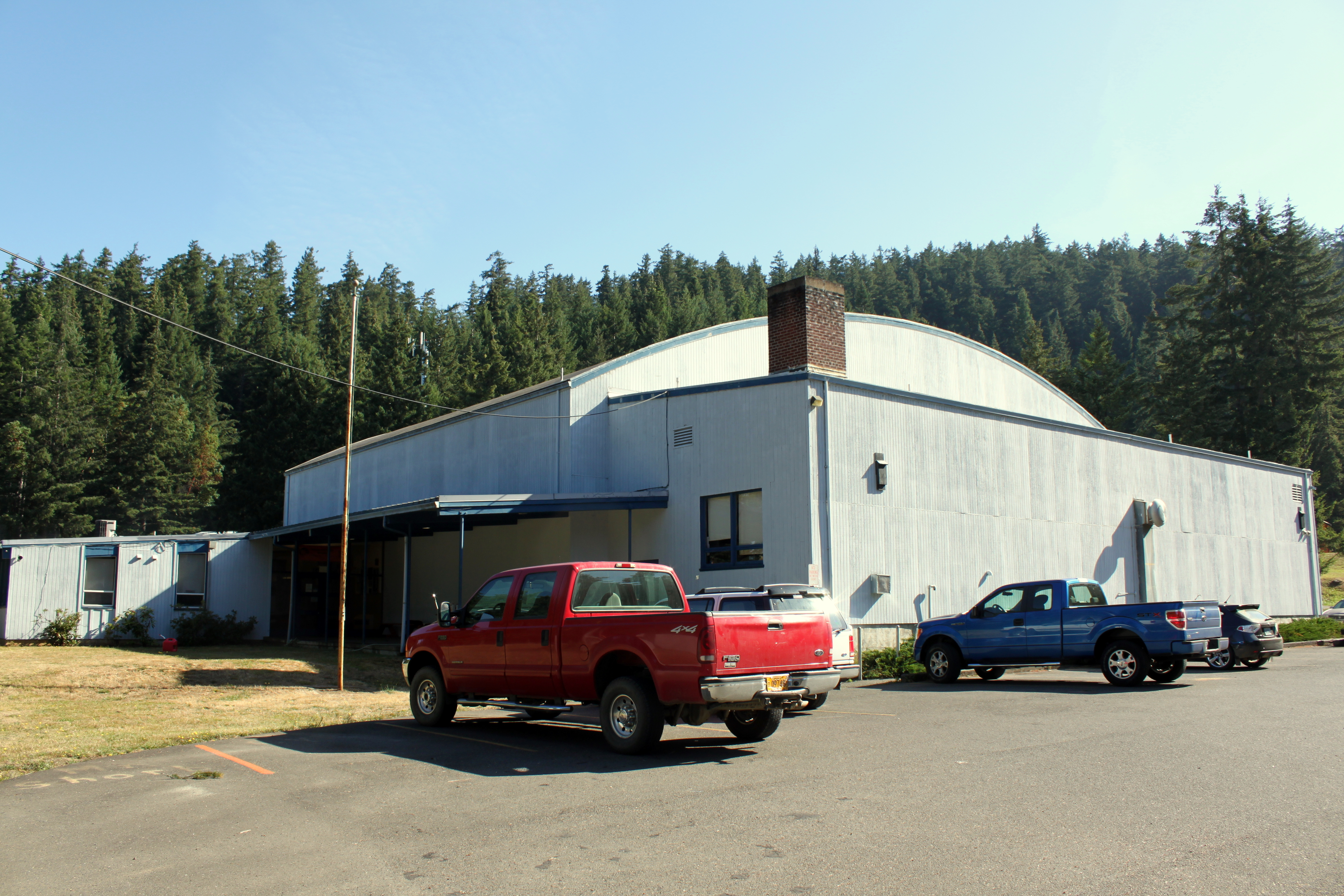

Location
- High School Hill Road; Powers, Coos County, Oregon 97466; United States; 42.881151°N 124.066506°W

Information
- Type: Public
- School district: Powers School District
- Principal: Matt Shorb
- Teaching staff: 6.28 (FTE)
- Grades: 7-12
- Enrollment: 66 (2022–2023)
- Student to teacher ratio: 10.51
- Colors: Orange and black
- Athletics conference: OSAA Skyline League 1A-4
- Mascot: Cruiser
- Website: www.powersschooldistrict.com/high-school/high-school
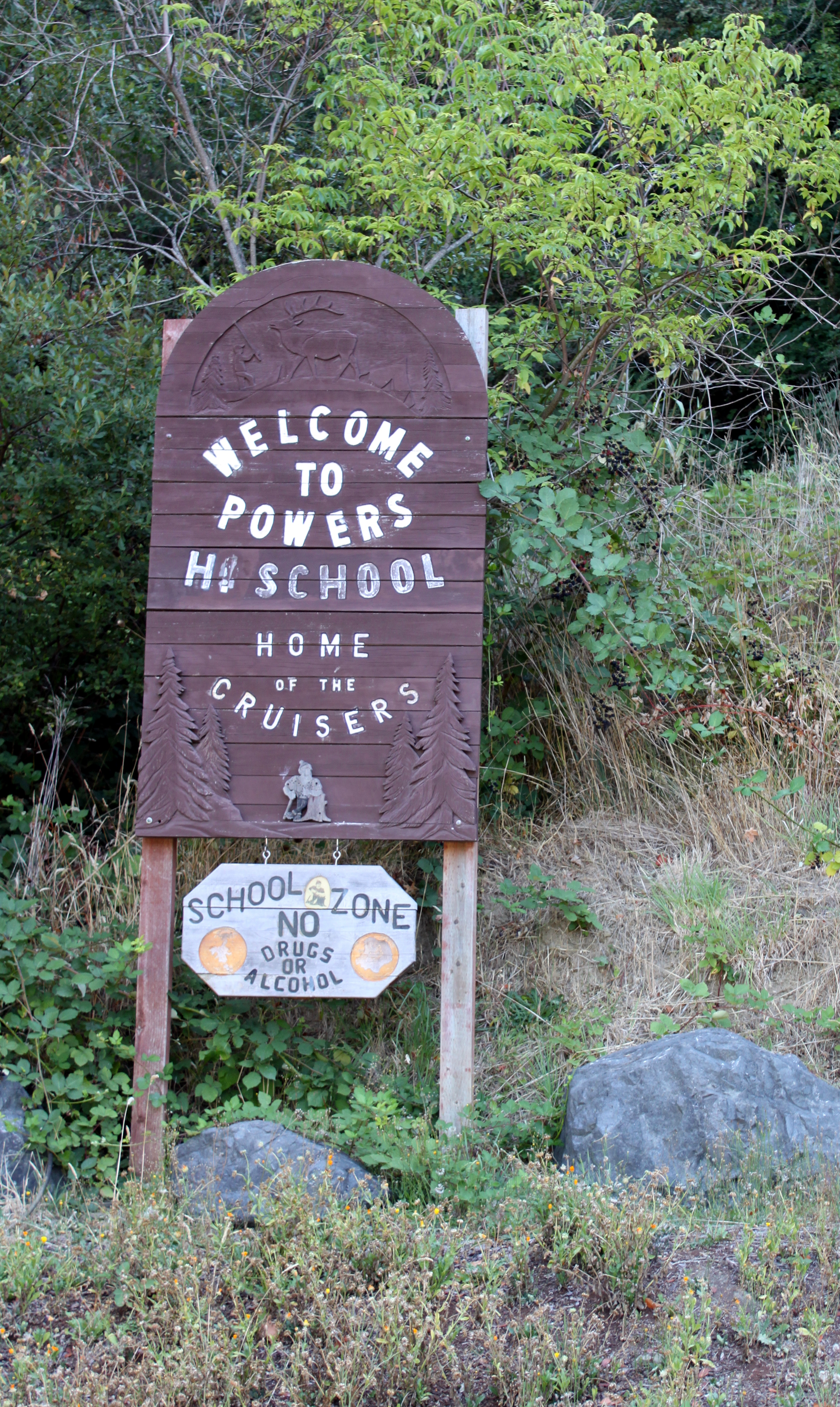

Powers High School is a public high school in Powers, Oregon, United States.

== Academics ==
In 2008, 80% of the school's seniors received their high school diploma. Of 10 students, 8 graduated, 1 dropped out, and 1 received a modified diploma.
