= Portland Fire (2000–2002) =

Portland Fire (2000)
- Conference: Western
- Leagues: WNBA
- Founded: 2000
- Dissolved: 2002
- History: Portland Fire; 2000–2002
- Arena: Rose Garden
- Location: Portland, Oregon
- Team colors: Red, black, gold, white
- General manager: Linda Hargrove
- Head coach: Linda Hargrove

The Portland Fire were a professional basketball team in the Women's National Basketball Association (WNBA) based in Portland, Oregon that joined the league in 2000 as the counterpart to the NBA’s Portland Trail Blazers and played their games at the Rose Garden. The team folded after the 2002 season, its third in the league. They were the only WNBA team that ceased operations without having made the playoffs.

== History ==
In its three-year history, the Portland Fire franchise held some of the more dubious distinctions among WNBA franchises. Founded in 2000, Portland Trail Blazers owner Paul Allen served as the team's chairman. The league held an expansion draft for the Fire, Indiana Fever, Miami Sol, and Seattle Storm on December 15, 1999. Led by Vanessa Nygaard and Sylvia Crawley, the team managed a 10–22 win–loss record in their inaugural season. In the 2001 season, the team faced another losing season but found hope in the play of rookie guard Jackie Stiles, who would win the WNBA Rookie of the Year Award. However, in 2002 Stiles suffered a severe injury and was out for most of the season. Without their star player, the Fire finished with a .500 record.

The 2002 season marked the end of the Portland Fire's time in the WNBA, but it was also their most improved campaign. Following that season, the league transitioned ownership of its teams to either their NBA counterparts or independent third parties. Portland Fire chairman Paul Allen, grappling with financial challenges tied to the Trail Blazers' widely perceived underperformance, opted not to purchase the Fire franchise, ultimately leading to the team's dissolution. While a group led by Clyde Drexler and Terry Emmert expressed interest in acquiring the franchise, they were unable to finalize a deal. With this, the Fire became the only WNBA franchise not to make the playoffs, and along with the Miami Sol, the WNBA franchise with the shortest lifespan.

On September 18, 2024, a new WNBA team in Portland was announced that will begin playing in 2026. On July 15, 2025, it was announced that the team would reprise the name Portland Fire.

== Season-by-season records ==
Season	Team	Conference		Regular Season			Playoff Results
Season	Team	Conference		W	L	PCT	Playoff Results
Portland Fire
2000	2000	West	7th	10	22	.313	Did not qualify
2001	2001	West	7th	11	21	.344	Did not qualify
2002	2002	West	5th	16	16	.500	Did not qualify
Regular season				37	59	.385	0 Conference Championships
Playoffs				0	0	.000	0 WNBA Championships

== Roster and coach ==
=== Players ===
- Tully Bevilaqua, who went on to play with the San Antonio Silver Stars
- Monique Cardenas, retired after rookie season and the Fire's folding in 2002.
- Sylvia Crawley, now as assistant coach for the North Carolina Tar Heels women's basketball team.
- Kristin Folkl, retired after the Fire's folding in 2002.
- Melody Johnson, retired after rookie season and the Fire's folding in 2002.
- Vanessa Nygaard: Head coach of the Phoenix Mercury from 2022 to 2023.
- Lynn Pride: Played for Portland in the inaugural expansion 2000 season before being traded to the Lynx, where she played for two and a half seasons (2001–03). She was waived by the Lynx before signing up with the Sparks, where she played the rest of the 2003 season before retiring.
- Jackie Stiles: Selected fourth overall by the Portland Fire in the 2001 WNBA Draft, she was later voted the Rookie of the Year on August 16, 2001. But since that high point, Stiles has suffered numerous injuries, including 13 surgeries, which has greatly hampered her WNBA career (2001–03). After the Fire folded in 2002, Stiles was selected 14th by the Los Angeles Sparks to play for the Sparks in the 2003 season, but did not play due to spending rehabilitation time for her injuries. She retired from the WNBA after that season, though her WNBA rights are still owned by the last team she was with, the L.A. Sparks. After an injury-hampered WNBA career, in 2004, Stiles made her first comeback to basketball in a new league on a new basketball team and signed with the Lubbock Hawks (in Lubbock, Texas) of the National Women's Basketball League (NWBL), which proved unsuccessful for her. Stiles made her second comeback to basketball in a different league with a different team on September 29, 2006, when the Canberra Times reported that Stiles signed to play for the Canberra Capitals in the Women's National Basketball League in Australia.
- Stacey Thomas: She was selected 23rd overall in the 2000 WNBA draft by the Portland Fire. When she became a free agent after the Fire's folding following the 2002 season, she signed with Portland's I-5 rivals, the Seattle Storm, but was waived before she even played in a Storm uniform. She played for the Phoenix Mercury, the team that signed Thomas after the Storm let her go, the 2003 WNBA Championship Detroit Shock team, the Minnesota Lynx, and then the Charlotte Sting. After the 2006 Charlotte Sting season, Stacey Thomas decided to retire from the WNBA in 2006 because she thought it was time. Following her retirement, the Charlotte Sting folded on January 3, 2007, just a few months prior to the start of the next WNBA season.
- Michele Van Gorp: An assistant coach at Colgate University since June 2007.
- DeMya Walker: Signed a free agent contract with the Portland Fire in 2000 after being released by the Minnesota Lynx a few months back, and played with them for all three seasons of their existence. The WNBA held a Dispersal draft on April 24, 2003, which Walker was a part of, that involved various former players from the newly-defunct Portland Fire and Miami Sol franchises that were chosen by the existing WNBA teams. The Sacramento Monarchs selected Walker as the fifth overall pick in the 2003 WNBA Dispersal Draft. Walker played the next several seasons with the Monarchs (2003–08), and helped the team win the 2005 WNBA Finals by defeating the Connecticut Sun, three games to one. Walker was waived by the Monarchs on May 15, 2008. Walker was re-signed by the team on July 21, 2008, making her a free agent.
- Sophia Witherspoon: Played a total of 7 seasons in the WNBA. Two of them with the Portland Fire (The first two seasons in franchise history; 2000 & 2001). Before that, she played with the New York Liberty from 1997 to 1999. After her 2000–01 stint with the Fire, she played her last two seasons with the Los Angeles Sparks in 2002–03 before retiring.

=== Head coach ===
Linda Hargrove was the head coach and general manager of the Portland Fire from 2000 to 2002. She later served as general manager of the Washington Mystics from 2005 until 2008.
