= 2001 WNBA season =

- League: Women's National Basketball Association
- Sport: Basketball
- Duration: May 28 - September 1, 2001
- Games: 32
- Teams: 16
- Total attendance: 2,322,962
- Average attendance: 9,074
- TV partner(s): ESPN, NBC

Draft
- Top draft pick: (Australia) Lauren Jackson
- Picked by: Seattle Storm

Regular season
- Top seed: Los Angeles Sparks
- Season MVP: (United States) Lisa Leslie (Los Angeles)
- Top scorer: (United States) Katie Smith (Minnesota)

Playoffs
- Finals champions: Los Angeles Sparks
- Runners-up: Charlotte Sting
- Finals MVP: (United States) Lisa Leslie (Los Angeles)

WNBA seasons
- ← 2000 2002 →

The 2001 WNBA season was the Women's National Basketball Association's fifth season. The season ended with the Los Angeles Sparks winning their first WNBA championship.

== Regular season ==
=== Standings ===
Eastern Conference

Eastern Conference	W	L	PCT	Conf.	GB
Cleveland Rockers ^{x}	22	10	.688	15–6	–
New York Liberty ^{x}	21	11	.656	13–8	1.0
Miami Sol ^{x}	20	12	.625	14–7	2.0
Charlotte Sting ^{x}	18	14	.563	15–6	4.0
Orlando Miracle ^{o}	13	19	.406	9–12	9.0
Indiana Fever ^{o}	10	22	.313	7–14	12.0
Detroit Shock ^{o}	10	22	.313	7–14	12.0
Washington Mystics ^{o}	10	22	.313	4–17	12.0

Western Conference

Western Conference	W	L	PCT	Conf.	GB
Los Angeles Sparks ^{x}	28	4	.875	19–2	–
Sacramento Monarchs ^{x}	20	12	.625	13–8	8.0
Utah Starzz ^{x}	19	13	.594	11–10	9.0
Houston Comets ^{x}	19	13	.594	13–8	9.0
Phoenix Mercury ^{o}	13	19	.406	8–13	15.0
Minnesota Lynx ^{o}	12	20	.375	9–12	16.0
Portland Fire ^{o}	11	21	.344	5–16	17.0
Seattle Storm ^{o}	10	22	.313	6–15	18.0

Note: Teams with an "X" clinched playoff spots.

== Playoffs ==
The top four teams from each conference qualified for the playoffs and were seeded based on their regular season standings.

**Conference semifinals** **Best-of-3**
E1	Cleveland	1
E4	**Charlotte**	**2**
**Eastern Conference**
E2	**New York**	**2**
E3	Miami	1
W1	**Los Angeles**	**2**
W4	Houston	0
**Western Conference**
W2	**Sacramento**	**2**
W3	Utah	0

**Conference finals** Best-of-3
E4	**Charlotte**	**2**
E2	New York	1
W1	**Los Angeles**	**2**
W2	Sacramento	1

**WNBA Finals**; Best-of-3
E4	Charlotte	0
W1	**Los Angeles**	**2**

- **Bold** – Series winner
- Italics – Team with home-court advantage

== Awards ==
=== Individual ===
Award		Winner	Team
Most Valuable Player (MVP)		Lisa Leslie	Los Angeles Sparks
Finals MVP		Lisa Leslie	Los Angeles Sparks
Defensive Player of the Year		Debbie Black	Miami Sol
Most Improved Player		Janeth Arcain	Houston Comets
Shooting Champions	**Field goal percentage**	Latasha Byears	Los Angeles Sparks
Shooting Champions	**Free throw percentage**	Elena Baranova	Miami Sol
Rookie of the Year		Jackie Stiles	Portland Fire
Kim Perrot Sportsmanship Award		Sue Wicks	New York Liberty
Coach of the Year		Dan Hughes	Cleveland Rockers

=== Team ===
Award		Player	Team
All-WNBA	First Team	Katie Smith	Minnesota Lynx
All-WNBA	First Team	Natalie Williams	Utah Starzz
All-WNBA	First Team	Lisa Leslie	Los Angeles Sparks
All-WNBA	First Team	Janeth Arcain	Houston Comets
All-WNBA	First Team	Merlakia Jones	Cleveland Rockers
All-WNBA	Second Team	Tina Thompson	Houston Comets
All-WNBA	Second Team	Chamique Holdsclaw	Washington Mystics
All-WNBA	Second Team	Yolanda Griffith	Sacramento Monarchs
All-WNBA	Second Team	Ticha Penicheiro	Sacramento Monarchs
All-WNBA	Second Team	Tamecka Dixon	Los Angeles Sparks

=== Players of the Week ===
Week ending	Player	Team
June 3	Katie Smith	Minnesota Lynx
June 10	Janeth Arcain	Houston Comets
June 17	Lisa Leslie	Los Angeles Sparks
June 24	Tina Thompson	Houston Comets
July 1	Jackie Stiles	Portland Fire
July 8	Dawn Staley	Charlotte Sting
July 22	Sheri Sam	Miami Sol
July 29	Natalie Williams	Utah Starzz
August 5	Lisa Leslie (2)	Los Angeles Sparks
August 12	Andrea Stinson	Charlotte Sting

== Coaches ==
=== Eastern Conference ===
- Charlotte Sting: Anne Donovan
- Cleveland Rockers: Dan Hughes
- Detroit Shock: Greg Williams
- Indiana Fever: Nell Fortner
- Miami Sol: Ron Rothstein
- New York Liberty: Richie Adubato
- Orlando Miracle: Carolyn Peck
- Washington Mystics: Tom Maher

=== Western Conference ===
- Houston Comets: Van Chancellor
- Los Angeles Sparks: Michael Cooper
- Minnesota Lynx: Brian Agler
- Phoenix Mercury: Cynthia Cooper
- Portland Fire: Linda Hargrove
- Sacramento Monarchs: Maura McHugh
- Seattle Storm: Lin Dunn
- Utah Starzz: Fred Williams and Candi Harvey
