= 2002 WNBA season =

- League: Women's National Basketball Association
- Sport: Basketball
- Duration: May 25 - August 31, 2002
- Games: 32
- Teams: 16
- Total attendance: 2,362,412
- Average attendance: 9,228
- TV partner(s): ESPN, NBC, Oxygen

Draft
- Top draft pick: (United States) Sue Bird
- Picked by: Seattle Storm

Regular season
- Top seed: Los Angeles Sparks
- Season MVP: (United States) Sheryl Swoopes (Houston)
- Top scorer: (United States) Chamique Holdsclaw (Washington)

Playoffs
- Finals champions: Los Angeles Sparks
- Runners-up: New York Liberty
- Finals MVP: (United States) Lisa Leslie (Los Angeles)

WNBA seasons
- ← 2001 2003 →

The 2002 WNBA season was the Women's National Basketball Association's sixth season. The season ended with the Los Angeles Sparks winning their second WNBA championship.

== Regular season ==
=== Standings ===
Eastern Conference

Eastern Conference	W	L	PCT	Conf.	GB
New York Liberty ^{x}	18	14	.563	11–10	–
Charlotte Sting ^{x}	18	14	.563	12–9	–
Washington Mystics ^{x}	17	15	.531	12–9	1.0
Indiana Fever ^{x}	16	16	.500	12–9	2.0
Orlando Miracle ^{o}	16	16	.500	13–8	2.0
Miami Sol ^{o}	15	17	.469	11–10	3.0
Cleveland Rockers ^{o}	10	22	.312	7–14	8.0
Detroit Shock ^{o}	9	23	.281	6–15	9.0

Western Conference

Western Conference	W	L	PCT	Conf.	GB
Los Angeles Sparks ^{x}	25	7	.781	17–4	–
Houston Comets ^{x}	24	8	.750	16–5	1.0
Utah Starzz ^{x}	20	12	.625	12–9	5.0
Seattle Storm ^{x}	17	15	.531	10–11	8.0
Portland Fire ^{o}	16	16	.500	8–13	9.0
Sacramento Monarchs ^{o}	14	18	.438	8–13	11.0
Phoenix Mercury ^{o}	11	21	.344	7–14	14.0
Minnesota Lynx ^{o}	10	22	.313	6–15	15.0

== Playoffs ==
**Conference semifinals** Best-of-3
E1	**New York**	**2**
E4	Indiana	1
**Eastern Conference**
E2	Charlotte	0
E3	**Washington**	**2**
W1	**Los Angeles**	**2**
W4	Seattle	0
**Western Conference**
W2	Houston	1
W3	**Utah**	**2**

**Conference finals** Best-of-3
E1	**New York**	**2**
E3	Washington	1
W1	**Los Angeles**	**2**
W3	Utah	0

**WNBA Finals**; Best-of-3
E1	New York	0
W1	**Los Angeles**	**2**

- **Bold** – Series winner
- Italics – Team with home-court advantage

== Awards ==
=== Individual ===
Award		Winner	Team
Most Valuable Player (MVP)		Sheryl Swoopes	Houston Comets
Finals MVP		Lisa Leslie	Los Angeles Sparks
Defensive Player of the Year		Sheryl Swoopes	Houston Comets
Most Improved Player		Coco Miller	Washington Mystics
Peak Performers	**Scoring**	Chamique Holdsclaw	Washington Mystics
Peak Performers	**Rebounding**	Chamique Holdsclaw	Washington Mystics
Rookie of the Year		Tamika Catchings	Indiana Fever
Kim Perrot Sportsmanship Award		Jennifer Gillom	Phoenix Mercury
Coach of the Year		Marianne Stanley	Washington Mystics

=== Team ===
Award		Player	Team
All-WNBA	First Team	Tamika Catchings	Indiana Fever
All-WNBA	First Team	Sheryl Swoopes	Houston Comets
All-WNBA	First Team	Lisa Leslie	Los Angeles Sparks
All-WNBA	First Team	Sue Bird	Seattle Storm
All-WNBA	First Team	Mwadi Mabika	Los Angeles Sparks
All-WNBA	Second Team	Tina Thompson	Houston Comets
All-WNBA	Second Team	Chamique Holdsclaw	Washington Mystics
All-WNBA	Second Team	Tari Phillips	New York Liberty
All-WNBA	Second Team	Katie Smith	Minnesota Lynx
All-WNBA	Second Team	Shannon Johnson	Orlando Miracle

=== Players of the Week ===
Week ending	Player	Team
June 2	Tamika Catchings	Indiana Fever
June 9	Shannon Johnson	Orlando Miracle
June 16	Chamique Holdsclaw	Washington Mystics
June 23	Nykesha Sales	Orlando Miracle
June 30	Sheryl Swoopes	Houston Comets
July 7	Allison Feaster	Charlotte Sting
July 21	Tamika Whitmore	New York Liberty
July 28	Lisa Leslie	Los Angeles Sparks
August 4	Yolanda Griffith	Sacramento Monarchs
August 11	Tamika Catchings (2)	Indiana Fever

== Coaches ==
=== Eastern Conference ===
- Charlotte Sting: Anne Donovan
- Cleveland Rockers: Dan Hughes
- Detroit Shock: Greg Williams and Bill Laimbeer
- Indiana Fever: Nell Fortner
- Miami Sol: Ron Rothstein
- New York Liberty: Richie Adubato
- Orlando Miracle: Dee Brown
- Washington Mystics: Marianne Stanley

=== Western Conference ===
- Houston Comets: Van Chancellor
- Los Angeles Sparks: Michael Cooper
- Minnesota Lynx: Brian Agler and Heidi VanDerveer
- Phoenix Mercury: Cynthia Cooper and Linda Sharp
- Portland Fire: Linda Hargrove
- Sacramento Monarchs: Maura McHugh
- Seattle Storm: Lin Dunn
- Utah Starzz: Candi Harvey
