= The W25 =

Top 25 WNBA players of all time, chosen 2021

The W25 are the Women's National Basketball Association's Top 25 Players of All Time, chosen in 2021 on the occasion of the 25th season of the WNBA from amongst 72 nominees compiled by the league. The group, selected by a panel consisting of media members and pioneering women's basketball figures, was to comprise the 25 best and most influential players of the first 25 years of the WNBA, with consideration also accorded to sportsmanship, community service, leadership, and contribution to the growth of women's basketball. To be considered, players had to have competed in the WNBA for at least two seasons, and fit at least four of seven criteria:

- Winning a major individual playing award.
- Selection to at least one All-WNBA Team at any level.
- Selection to at least one WNBA All-Defensive Team at any level.
- Selection for at least one WNBA All-Star Game.
- Member of at least one WNBA championship team.
- A ranking among the top 40 career leaders in any major statistical category, as of the start of the 2021 season.
- Winner of the WNBA's season-long Community Assist Award.

The W25 were announced on September 5, 2021 at halftime of the Las Vegas Aces–Chicago Sky game, televised in the U.S. by ABC.

The announcement of The W25 was immediately followed by "Vote for the GOAT". From September 5–19, fans voted on the WNBA's official website, the WNBA's mobile app, and Twitter to determine which member of The W25 they considered to be the league's greatest of all time. Before Game 1 of the 2021 WNBA Finals on October 10 at Footprint Center (now Mortgage Matchup Center) in Phoenix, Arizona, Diana Taurasi was announced as the fans' "GOAT".

== Players selected ==
Notes

- All information only pertains to the first 25 years of the league's existence.
- No awards or honors that were presented after the 2021 regular season are included. The 2021 All-Star Game is included because it took place before the final announcement of The W25.

^	Denotes player who was still active in the WNBA at time of award
~	Inducted into the Women's Basketball Hall of Fame
	Inducted into the Naismith Basketball Hall of Fame

Player	Nationality	Position	Team(s)	League titles	League awards	All-Star Games	All-Decade Team	Top 15 Team	Top 20 Team
Seimone Augustus	United States	SF	Minnesota Lynx (2006–2019); Los Angeles Sparks (2020)	2011, 2013, 2015, 2017	Finals MVP (2011); ROY (2006); 6× All-WNBA	2006–2007, 2011, 2013–2015, 2017, 2018	—N/a	Nominated	Yes
Sue Bird^	United States	PG	Seattle Storm (2002–2022; entire career)	2004, 2010, 2018, 2020	KPSA (2011, 2017, 2018); 8× All-WNBA	2002, 2003, 2005–2007, 2009, 2011, 2014, 2015, 2017, 2018, 2021, 2022	Yes	Yes	Yes
Swin Cash	United States	PF	Detroit Shock (2002–2007); Seattle Storm (2008–2011); Chicago Sky (2012–2013); Atlanta Dream (2014); New York Liberty (2014–2016)	2003, 2006, 2010	ASG MVP (2009, 2011); KPSA (2013); 2× All-WNBA	2003, 2005, 2007, 2011	Nominated	Nominated	Yes
Tamika Catchings	United States	SF	Indiana Fever (2002–2016; entire career)	2012	MVP (2011); Finals MVP (2012); ROY (2002); DPOY (2005, 2006, 2009, 2010, 2012); KPSA (2010, 2013); 12× All-WNBA; 12× All-Defensive	2002–2003, 2005–2007, 2009, 2011	Yes	Yes	Yes
Tina Charles^	United States	C	Connecticut Sun (2010–2013); New York Liberty (2014–2019); Washington Mystics (2021); Phoenix Mercury (2022); Seattle Storm (2022); Atlanta Dream (2024); Connecticut Sun (2025–)	None	MVP (2012); ROY (2010); 9× All-WNBA; 4× All-Defensive	2011, 2013–2015, 2017–2019, 2021	—N/a	—N/a	Nominated
Cynthia Cooper	United States	SG	Houston Comets (1997–2000, 2003; entire career)	1997–2000	MVP (1997, 1998); Finals MVP (1997–2000); 4× All-WNBA	1999, 2000, 2003	Yes	Yes	Yes
Elena Delle Donne^	United States	F/G	Chicago Sky (2013–2016); Washington Mystics (2017–2023)	2019	2x MVP (2015, 2019); ROY (2013); 5× All-WNBA	2013–2015, 2017–2019, 2023	—N/a	—N/a	Nominated
Sylvia Fowles^	United States	C	Chicago Sky (2008–2014); Minnesota Lynx (2015–2022)	2015, 2017	MVP (2017); Finals MVP (2015, 2017); 4x DPOY (2011, 2013, 2016, 2021); 8× All-WNBA; 11× All-Defensive	2009, 2011, 2013, 2017–2019, 2021, 2022	—N/a	—N/a	Nominated
Yolanda Griffith	United States	C	Sacramento Monarchs (1999–2007); Seattle Storm (2008); Indiana Fever (2009)	2005	MVP (1999); Finals MVP (2005); DPOY (1999); ASG MVP (2004); 5×All-WNBA	1999–2001, 2003, 2005–2007	Yes	Yes	Yes
Brittney Griner^	United States	C	Phoenix Mercury (2013–2024); Atlanta Dream (2025–)	2014	DPOY (2014, 2015); 5× All-WNBA; 6× All-Defensive	2013–2015, 2017–2019, 2021	—N/a	—N/a	Nominated
Becky Hammon	United States; Russia	PG	New York Liberty (1999–2006); San Antonio Silver Stars/Stars (2007–2014)	None	KPSA (2014); 4×All-WNBA	2003, 2005–2007, 2009, 2011	Nominated	Yes	Yes
Lauren Jackson	Australia	C	Seattle Storm (2001–2012; entire career)	2004, 2010	MVP (2003, 2007, 2010); Finals MVP (2010); DPOY (2007); 8×All-WNBA	2001–2003, 2005–2007, 2009	Yes	Yes	Yes
Lisa Leslie	United States	C	Los Angeles Sparks (1997–2009) (entire career)	2001, 2002	MVP (2001, 2004, 2006); Finals MVP (2001, 2002); ASG MVP (1999, 2001, 2002); DPOY (2004, 2008); 12×All-WNBA	1999–2003, 2005–2006, 2009	Yes	Yes	Yes
Angel McCoughtry^	United States	F/G	Atlanta Dream (2009–2018); Las Vegas Aces (2020–2021); Minnesota Lynx (2022)	None	ROY (2009); 6× All-WNBA; 8× All-Defensive	2011, 2013–2015, 2018	—N/a	—N/a	Nominated
Maya Moore~	United States	SF	Minnesota Lynx (2011–2018; entire career) (Note: Moore last played in the WNBA in 2018, but did not officially announce her retirement until January 2023.)	2011, 2013, 2015, 2017	MVP (2014); Finals MVP (2013); ASG MVP (2015, 2017, 2018); ROY (2011); 7× All-WNBA; 2× All-Defensive	2011, 2013–2015, 2017, 2018	—N/a	—N/a	Yes
Nneka Ogwumike^	United States	PF	Los Angeles Sparks (2012–2023); Seattle Storm (2024–)	2016	MVP (2016); ROY (2012); KPSA (2019, 2020); 6× All-WNBA; 6× All-Defensive	2013–2015, 2017–2019, 2022, 2023	—N/a	—N/a	Nominated
Candace Parker^	United States	PF	Los Angeles Sparks (2008–2020); Chicago Sky (2021–2022); Las Vegas Aces (2023)	2016, 2021, 2023	MVP (2008, 2013); DPOY (2020); ASG MVP (2013); Finals MVP (2016); ROY (2008); 10× All-WNBA; 2× All-Defensive	2011, 2013, 2014, 2017, 2018, 2021, 2022	—N/a	Nominated	Yes
Ticha Penicheiro~	Portugal	PG	Sacramento Monarchs (1998–2009); Los Angeles Sparks (2010–2011); Chicago Sky (2012)	2005	3× All-WNBA; 1× All-Defensive	1999–2002	Honorable mention	Yes	Yes
Cappie Pondexter	United States	SG	Phoenix Mercury (2006–2009); New York Liberty (2010–2014); Chicago Sky (2015–2017); Los Angeles Sparks (2018); Indiana Fever (2018)	2007, 2009	Finals MVP (2007); 4× All-WNBA; 1× All-Defensive	2006–2007, 2009, 2011, 2013–2015	—N/a	Yes	Yes
Katie Smith	United States	SG	Minnesota Lynx (1999–2005); Detroit Shock (2005–2009); Washington Mystics (2010); Seattle Storm (2011–2012); New York Liberty (2013)	2006, 2008	Finals MVP (2008); 4×All-WNBA	2000–2003, 2005–2006, 2009	Yes	Yes	Yes
Breanna Stewart^	United States	PF	Seattle Storm (2016–2022); New York Liberty (2023–)	2018, 2020, 2024	MVP (2018, 2023); Finals MVP (2018, 2020); ROY (2016); 6× All-WNBA; 6× All-Defensive	2017, 2018, 2021-2024	—N/a	—N/a	—N/a
Sheryl Swoopes	United States	SF	Houston Comets (1997–2000, 2002–2007); Seattle Storm (2008); Tulsa Shock (2011)	1997–2000	MVP (2000, 2002, 2005); DPOY (2000, 2002, 2003); ASG MVP (2005); 7× All-WNBA; 2× All-Defensive	1999, 2000, 2002–2003, 2005–2006	Yes	Yes	Yes
Diana Taurasi^	United States	SG	Phoenix Mercury (2004–2014, 2016–2024; entire WNBA career)	2007, 2009, 2014	MVP (2009); Finals MVP (2009, 2014); ROY (2004); 14× All-WNBA	2005–2007, 2009, 2011, 2013–2014, 2017–2018, 2021	Honorable mention	Yes	Yes
Tina Thompson	United States	SF	Houston Comets (1997–2008); Los Angeles Sparks (2009–2011); Seattle Storm (2012–2013)	1997–2000	ASG MVP (2000); 8× All-WNBA	1999–2003, 2006, 2007, 2009	Yes	Yes	Yes
Lindsay Whalen	United States	PG	Connecticut Sun (2004-2009); Minnesota Lynx (2010–2018)	2011, 2013, 2015, 2017	5× All-WNBA	2006, 2011, 2013–2015	No	No	Yes

- The inaugural WNBA All-Star Game took place during the 1999 season, and the game has been contested yearly since, with the following exceptions:
  - From 2004 through 2016, no All-Star Game was held in any Olympic year. The 2004 edition was supplanted by a game between WNBA players from both conferences and the 2004 United States Olympic team, and the 2010 edition was replaced by a game between WNBA players from both conferences and Team USA, but the WNBA does not consider either to have been an All-Star Game.
  - No All-Star Game was scheduled in 2020, accommodating the original scheduling of that year's Summer Olympics. The Olympics were delayed to 2021 due to COVID-19 issues.
  - With the Tokyo Olympics rescheduled for 2021, the WNBA held a pre-Olympic game between WNBA players from both conferences and the 2021 US Olympic team. Unlike the 2004 and 2010 editions, the 2021 edition was officially classified as an All-Star Game.
- Players who were voted to start in All-Star Games but were unable to play due to injury are nevertheless considered to have been starters; players voted as reserves who started in place of other injured players are nevertheless considered to have been reserves.
- Three players included in previous lists, Dawn Staley (All-Decade and 15 Years Team), Teresa Weatherspoon (15 Years and 20@20) and Deanna Nolan (20@20) missed the W25.
