= Stars at the Sun =

Exhibition basketball game

	1	2	3	4	Total
USA	29	20	26	24	99
WNBA	19	9	16	28	72
- Date: July 10, 2010
- Arena: Mohegan Sun Arena
- City: Uncasville, Connecticut
- MVP: Sylvia Fowles, Team USA
- Attendance: 9,518
- Network: ABC

WNBA All-Star Game
< 2009	2011 >

The Stars at the Sun game was played on July 10, 2010 at Mohegan Sun Arena in Uncasville, Connecticut, home of the Connecticut Sun. This game, unlike previous non-Olympic year games, was a contest between the USA women's national team and a team of WNBA All-Stars. This game is not considered a WNBA All-Star Game. This was the third time Connecticut has hosted the mid-season basketball showcase, after previously hosting the 2005 and 2009 All-Star games.

== The Game ==
=== Rosters ===
USA Basketball Team
Pos.	Player	Team
Starters
PG	(United States) Sue Bird	Seattle Storm
SG	(United States) Cappie Pondexter	New York Liberty
SF	(United States) Diana Taurasi	Phoenix Mercury
SF	(United States) Tamika Catchings	Indiana Fever
C	(United States) Sylvia Fowles	Chicago Sky
Reserves
G	(United States) Renee Montgomery	Connecticut Sun
F	(United States) Angel McCoughtry	Atlanta Dream
F	(United States) Maya Moore	UConn
F	(United States) Swin Cash	Seattle Storm
F	(United States) Candice Dupree	Phoenix Mercury
F	(United States) Candace Parker^{1}	Los Angeles Sparks
C	(United States) Tina Charles	Connecticut Sun

WNBA Team
Pos.	Player	Team
Starters
PG	(United States) Lindsey Harding^{2}	Washington Mystics
SG	(United States) Katie Douglas	Indiana Fever
SF	(United States) Monique Currie^{2}	Washington Mystics
PF	(United States) Crystal Langhorne	Washington Mystics
C	(United States) Michelle Snow	San Antonio Silver Stars
Reserves
G	(United States) Becky Hammon^{1}	San Antonio Silver Stars
G	(Australia) Penny Taylor	Phoenix Mercury
G	(United States) Lindsay Whalen^{2}	Minnesota Lynx
F	(Brazil) Iziane Castro Marques	Atlanta Dream
F	(United States) Jayne Appel	San Antonio Silver Stars
F	(Saint Vincent and the Grenadines) Sophia Young	San Antonio Silver Stars
F	(United States) Rebekkah Brunson	Minnesota Lynx
F	(Australia) Lauren Jackson^{1}	Seattle Storm
F	(Spain) Sancho Lyttle^{1}	Atlanta Dream

- ^{1} Injured
- ^{2} Injury replacement
- ^{3} Starting in place of injured player

ABC (HD)

July 10
3:30pm

Report

USA 99, WNBA 72
Scoring by quarter: 29–19, 20–9, 26–16, 24–28
Pts: Fowles 23; Rebs: Dupree, Fowles, Moore each 8 Asts: Pondexter 6	Pts: Douglas 15; Rebs: Harding 7 Asts: Harding 4

Mohegan Sun Arena, Uncasville, Connecticut
Attendance: 9,518
Referees: Michael Price, Cameron Inouye, Kurt Walker

=== Coaches ===
The coach for Team USA is Connecticut Huskies women's basketball coach Geno Auriemma. The coach for the WNBA Team is Seattle Storm coach Brian Agler.

== Other events ==
=== Three-Point Shootout ===
Position	Player	From	Year to ASG			1st	2nd
Position	Player	From	Made	Attempted	Percent	1st	2nd
SG	(United States) Katie Douglas	Indiana Fever	38	90	.422	24	23
PG	(United States) Lindsay Whalen	Minnesota Lynx	8	34	.235	?	11
SF	(United States) Swin Cash	Seattle Storm	20	44	.455	?	7
PG	(United States) Sue Bird	Seattle Storm	34	86	.395	?	DNQ
SF	(United States) Monique Currie	Washington Mystics	22	47	.468	?	DNQ
SF	(United States) Angel McCoughtry	Atlanta Dream	18	70	.257	?	DNQ

=== Skills Challenge ===
Player	From	Height	Weight	1st	2nd
(United States) Renee Montgomery	Connecticut Sun	5-7	143	29.4	25.0
(United States) Cappie Pondexter	New York Liberty	5-9	160	31.3	32.1
(United States) Lindsay Whalen	Minnesota Lynx	5-9	169	26.6	34.2
(Brazil) Iziane Castro Marques	Atlanta Dream	6-0	140	N/A	
(United States) Lindsey Harding	Washington Mystics	5-8	139	N/A	
(United States) Angel McCoughtry	Atlanta Dream	6-1	160	N/A	
