= 2007 WNBA All-Star Game =

Exhibition basketball game

	1	2	3	4	Total
West	28	25	14	32	99
East	23	30	25	25	103
- Date: July 15, 2007
- Arena: Verizon Center
- City: Washington D.C.
- MVP: Cheryl Ford
- Attendance: 19,487

WNBA All-Star Game
< 2006	2009 >

The 2007 WNBA All-Star Game was played on July 15, 2007 at Verizon Center in Washington D.C., home of the Washington Mystics. The game was the 8th annual WNBA All-Star Game. This was the second time Washington has hosted the basketball showcase, after previously hosting the 2002 game. The East defeated the West, 103–99, with Cheryl Ford winning the All-Star Game MVP award after recording 16 points and 13 rebounds.

== The All-Star Game ==
=== Rosters ===
Western Conference All-Stars
Pos.	Player	Team	Selection #
Starters
PG	(United States) Sue Bird^{1}	Seattle Storm	5th
SG	(United States) Becky Hammon	San Antonio Silver Stars	4th
SF	(United States) Diana Taurasi	Phoenix Mercury	3rd
PF	(Australia) Lauren Jackson	Seattle Storm	6th
C	(United States) Yolanda Griffith	Sacramento Monarchs	7th
Reserves
SG	(United States) Cappie Pondexter	Phoenix Mercury	2nd
SG	(United States) Kara Lawson^{2}	Sacramento Monarchs	1st
SF	(United States) Seimone Augustus	Minnesota Lynx	2nd
SF	(United States) Tina Thompson^{3}	Houston Comets	7th
SF	(Saint Vincent and the Grenadines) Sophia Young^{2}	San Antonio Silver Stars	2nd
PF	(United States) Rebekkah Brunson^{1}	Sacramento Monarchs	1st
PF	(United States) Taj McWilliams-Franklin	Los Angeles Sparks	6th
PF	(Australia) Penny Taylor	Phoenix Mercury	2nd

Eastern Conference All Stars
Pos.	Player	Team	Selection #
Starters
PG	(United States) Deanna Nolan	Detroit Shock	4th
SG	(United States) Anna DeForge	Indiana Fever	1st
SF	(United States) Tamika Catchings	Indiana Fever	5th
PF	(United States) Cheryl Ford	Detroit Shock	4th
C	(United States) Kara Braxton	Detroit Shock	1st
Reserves
SG	(United States) Alana Beard	Washington Mystics	3rd
SG	(United States) Katie Douglas	Connecticut Sun	2nd
SF	(United States) Candice Dupree	Chicago Sky	2nd
SF	(United States) Delisha Milton-Jones	Washington Mystics	2nd
PF	(United States) Asjha Jones	Connecticut Sun	1st
C	(Canada) Tammy Sutton-Brown	Indiana Fever	2nd

- ^{1} Injured
- ^{2} Injury replacement
- ^{3} Starting in place of injured player

ABC

July 15
3:30 p.m.

Western Conference 103, Eastern Conference 99
Pts: Tina Thompson 19; Rebs: Taj McWilliams-Franklin 9 Asts: Diana Taurasi 9	Pts: Katie Douglas 18; Rebs: Cheryl Ford 13; Asts: Alana Beard 8

Verizon Center, Washington D.C.
Attendance: 19,487
Referees:
1. 55 Eric Brewton, #9 Denise Brooks-Clauser, #7 Clarke Stevens

=== Coaches ===
The coach for the Western Conference all-stars was Sacramento Monarchs coach Jenny Boucek. The coach for the Eastern Conference was Detroit Shock coach Bill Laimbeer.

== Other events ==
=== Three-Point Shootout ===
Contestants
Pos.	Player	Team	Made	Att.	Pct.	1st	2nd
SG	(United States) Laurie Koehn	Washington Mystics	12	33	.364	23	25
SF	(United States) Diana Taurasi	Phoenix Mercury	95	259	.357	21	16
SF	(Australia) Penny Taylor	Phoenix Mercury	34	90	.378	20	19
SG	(United States) Katie Douglas	Connecticut Sun	68	201	.338	19	
SG	(United States) Deanna Nolan	Detroit Shock	46	117	.393	11	

=== Skills Challenge ===
Contestants
Pos.	Player	Team	Ht.	Wt.	1st	2nd
PG	(United States) Becky Hammon	San Antonio Silver Stars	5–6	136	34.6	27.1
SF	(United States) Seimone Augustus	Minnesota Lynx	6–0	179	28.3	27.4
SG	(United States) Betty Lennox	Seattle Storm	5–8	143	40.0	
PG	(United States) Nikki Teasley	Washington Mystics	6–0	169	39.4	
