= The Game at Radio City =

Exhibition basketball game

	1	2	Total
USA	39	35	74
WNBA	20	38	58
- Date: August 5, 2004
- Arena: Radio City Music Hall
- City: New York, New York
- MVP: Yolanda Griffith
- Attendance: 5,945

WNBA All-Star Game
< 2003	2005 >

The Game at Radio City is an exhibition women's basketball game played on August 5, 2004, at Radio City Music Hall in New York, New York. The game was played in place of the WNBA All-Star Game during the 2004 season.

In order to allow players to participate in the 2004 Summer Olympics, the WNBA took a month-long break. However, prior to the teams heading to Athens, the WNBA hosted an exhibition game between the U.S. Olympic Team and a team of WNBA stars. Every player on the Olympic team was also an WNBA player. The WNBA squad consisted of American players, with the exception of Mwadi Mabika who was from the Democratic Republic of the Congo. (Her country's women's basketball team did not qualify for the Olympics that year.)

Team USA defeated the WNBA stars, 74–58.

== The Game ==
=== Rosters ===
USA Olympic Team
Pos.	Player	Team
Starters
PG	(United States) Dawn Staley	Charlotte Sting
SG	(United States) Shannon Johnson	San Antonio Silver Stars
SF	(United States) Tamika Catchings	Indiana Fever
PF	(United States) Tina Thompson	Houston Comets
C	(United States) Lisa Leslie	Los Angeles Sparks
Reserves
PG	(United States) Sue Bird	Seattle Storm
SG	(United States) Diana Taurasi	Phoenix Mercury
SF	(United States) Swin Cash	Detroit Shock
SF	(United States) Delisha Milton-Jones ^{1}	Los Angeles Sparks
SF	(United States) Katie Smith ^{3}	Minnesota Lynx
SF	(United States) Sheryl Swoopes ^{3}	Houston Comets
PF	(United States) Ruth Riley ^{2}	Detroit Shock
C	(United States) Yolanda Griffith	Sacramento Monarchs

WNBA Team
Pos.	Player	Team
Starters
PG	(United States) Nikki Teasley	Los Angeles Sparks
SG	(United States) Anna DeForge	Phoenix Mercury
SF	(United States) Nykesha Sales	Connecticut Sun
PF	(United States) Cheryl Ford	Detroit Shock
C	(United States) Taj McWilliams-Franklin	Connecticut Sun
Reserves
PG	(United States) Becky Hammon	New York Liberty
PG	(United States) Lindsay Whalen	Connecticut Sun
SG	(United States) Deanna Nolan	Detroit Shock
SF	(United States) Allison Feaster	Charlotte Sting
SF	(Democratic Republic of the Congo) Mwadi Mabika	Los Angeles Sparks
PF	(United States) Natalie Williams	Indiana Fever

- ^{1} Injured
- ^{2} Injury replacement
- ^{3} Injured at time of game, but no replacement selected

ESPN

August 5
7:00 p.m.

USA Olympic Team 74, WNBA Team 58
Pts: Lisa Leslie 15; Rebs: Yolanda Griffith 15; Asts: Bird, Johnson, Staley 3	Pts: Mwadi Mabika 11; Rebs: Natalie Williams 6 Asts: Natalie Williams 4

Radio City Music Hall, New York, New York

=== Coaches ===
The coach for the USA Olympic Team was Houston Comets coach Van Chancellor. The coach for the WNBA Team was Detroit Shock coach Bill Laimbeer.
