= WNBA All-Defensive Team =

Women's basketball honor

The WNBA All-Defensive Team is an annual Women's National Basketball Association (WNBA) honor given since the 2005 WNBA season to the best defensive players during the regular season. Voting is conducted by the WNBA head coaches. who are not allowed to vote for players on their own team. The All-Defensive Team is composed of two five-woman lineups, a first and a second team, comprising a total of 10 roster spots. The players each receive two points for each first team vote and one point for each second team vote. The top five players with the highest point total make the first team, with the next five making the second team. Starting with the 2023 season, players are selected without regard to position; this follows the WNBA having adopted a "positionless" format for the All-WNBA Team in 2022. Before 2023, each team consisted of one center, two forwards, and two guards. During that time, if there was already a center on the first team, but another center received more points than two of the guards on the first team, that center would still be on the second team.

Tamika Catchings has the record for the most total selections with 11. Catchings has 10 first team selections and 1 second team selection.

In 2020, Defensive Player of the Year Candace Parker, was not selected to either of the WNBA All-Defensive Teams. This was the first time in the history of the award that the Defensive Player of the Year was not selected to an All-Defensive Team in either the WNBA or NBA. It reflects a difference in voters: The WNBA's defensive player of the year is voted on by media, while the all-defensive teams are voted on by the league's coaches.

== Winners ==
Player (X)	Denotes the number of times the player has been selected
**Player** **(in bold text)**	Indicates the player who won the WNBA Defensive Player of the Year in the same year^{[a]}

=== 2005 to present ===
Season	First team			Second team		
Season	Player	Nationality	Team	Player	Nationality	Team
2005	**Tamika Catchings**	United States	Indiana Fever	Lauren Jackson	Australia	Seattle Storm
2005	Sheryl Swoopes	United States	Houston Comets	Taj McWilliams-Franklin	United States	Connecticut Sun
2005	Yolanda Griffith	United States	Sacramento Monarchs	Lisa Leslie	United States	Los Angeles Sparks
2005	Tully Bevilaqua	Australia	Indiana Fever	Alana Beard	United States	Washington Mystics
2005	Katie Douglas	United States	Connecticut Sun	Deanna Nolan	United States	Detroit Shock
2006	**Tamika Catchings** (2)	United States	Indiana Fever	Alana Beard (2)	United States	Washington Mystics
2006	Lisa Leslie (2)	United States	Los Angeles Sparks	Margo Dydek	Poland	Connecticut Sun
2006	Sheryl Swoopes (2)	United States	Houston Comets	Deanna Nolan (2)	United States	Detroit Shock
2006	Tully Bevilaqua (2)	Australia	Indiana Fever	Cheryl Ford	United States	Detroit Shock
2006	Katie Douglas (2)	United States	Connecticut Sun	Yolanda Griffith (2)	United States	Sacramento Monarchs
2007	Tamika Catchings (3)	United States	Indiana Fever	Tully Bevilaqua (3)	Australia	Indiana Fever
2007	**Lauren Jackson** (2)	Australia	Seattle Storm	Rebekkah Brunson	United States	Sacramento Monarchs
2007	Katie Douglas (3)	United States	Connecticut Sun	Margo Dydek (2)	Poland	Connecticut Sun
2007	Alana Beard (3)	United States	Washington Mystics	Loree Moore	United States	New York Liberty
2007	Deanna Nolan (3)	United States	Detroit Shock	Chelsea Newton	United States	Sacramento Monarchs
2008	**Lisa Leslie** (3)	United States	Los Angeles Sparks	Sylvia Fowles	United States	Chicago Sky
2008	Tamika Catchings (4)	United States	Indiana Fever	Lauren Jackson (3)	Australia	Seattle Storm
2008	Sophia Young	(Saint Vincent and the Grenadines) St. Vincent	San Antonio Silver Stars	Rebekkah Brunson (2)	United States	Sacramento Monarchs
2008	Ticha Penicheiro	Portugal	Sacramento Monarchs	Deanna Nolan (4)	United States	Detroit Shock
2008	Tully Bevilaqua (4)	Australia	Indiana Fever	Katie Smith	United States	Detroit Shock
2009	**Tamika Catchings** (5)	United States	Indiana Fever	Lisa Leslie (4)	United States	Los Angeles Sparks
2009	Lauren Jackson (4)	Australia	Seattle Storm	Sancho Lyttle	(Saint Vincent and the Grenadines) St. Vincent	Atlanta Dream
2009	Nicky Anosike	United States	Minnesota Lynx	Angel McCoughtry	United States	Atlanta Dream
2009	Tanisha Wright	United States	Seattle Storm	Deanna Nolan (5)	United States	Detroit Shock
2009	Tully Bevilaqua (5)	Australia	Indiana Fever	Candace Parker	United States	Los Angeles Sparks
2009				Alana Beard (4)	United States	Washington Mystics
2010	**Tamika Catchings** (6)	United States	Indiana Fever	Lauren Jackson (5)	Australia	Seattle Storm
2010	Angel McCoughtry (2)	United States	Atlanta Dream	Rebekkah Brunson (3)	United States	Minnesota Lynx
2010	Sylvia Fowles (2)	United States	Chicago Sky	Sancho Lyttle (2)	Spain	Atlanta Dream
2010	Tanisha Wright (2)	United States	Seattle Storm	Lindsey Harding	United States	Washington Mystics
2010	Cappie Pondexter	United States	New York Liberty	Tully Bevilaqua (6)	Australia	Indiana Fever
2010				Katie Douglas (4)	United States	Indiana Fever
2011	Tamika Catchings (7)	United States	Indiana Fever	Sancho Lyttle (3)	Spain	Atlanta Dream
2011	Rebekkah Brunson (4)	United States	Minnesota Lynx	Swin Cash	United States	Seattle Storm
2011	**Sylvia Fowles** (3)	United States	Chicago Sky	Tina Charles	United States	Connecticut Sun
2011	Tanisha Wright (3)	United States	Seattle Storm	Armintie Price	United States	Atlanta Dream
2011	Angel McCoughtry (3)	United States	Atlanta Dream	Katie Douglas (5)	United States	Indiana Fever
2012	**Tamika Catchings** (8)	United States	Indiana Fever	Sophia Young (2)	(Saint Vincent and the Grenadines) St. Vincent	San Antonio Silver Stars
2012	Sancho Lyttle (4)	Spain	Atlanta Dream	Candace Parker (2)	United States	Los Angeles Sparks
2012	Sylvia Fowles (4)	United States	Chicago Sky	Tina Charles (2)	United States	Connecticut Sun
2012	Alana Beard (5)	United States	Los Angeles Sparks	Armintie Price (2)	United States	Atlanta Dream
2012	Briann January	United States	Indiana Fever	Danielle Robinson	United States	San Antonio Silver Stars
2013	**Sylvia Fowles** (5)	United States	Chicago Sky	Rebekkah Brunson (5)	United States	Minnesota Lynx
2013	Tamika Catchings (9)	United States	Indiana Fever	Glory Johnson	United States	Tulsa Shock
2013	Angel McCoughtry (4)	United States	Atlanta Dream	Érika de Souza	Brazil	Atlanta Dream
2013	Armintie Price (3)	United States	Atlanta Dream	Briann January (2)	United States	Indiana Fever
2013	Tanisha Wright (4)	United States	Seattle Storm	Jia Perkins (tie)	United States	San Antonio Silver Stars
2013				Danielle Robinson (2) (tie)	United States	San Antonio Silver Stars
2014	Sancho Lyttle (5)	Spain	Atlanta Dream	Tamika Catchings (10)	United States	Indiana Fever
2014	Angel McCoughtry (5)	United States	Atlanta Dream	Maya Moore	United States	Minnesota Lynx
2014	**Brittney Griner**	United States	Phoenix Mercury	Sylvia Fowles (6)	United States	Chicago Sky
2014	Tanisha Wright (5)	United States	Seattle Storm	Alana Beard (6)	United States	Los Angeles Sparks
2014	Briann January (3)	United States	Indiana Fever	Danielle Robinson (3)	United States	San Antonio Stars
2015	Tamika Catchings (11)	United States	Indiana Fever	Tina Charles (3)	United States	New York Liberty
2015	Nneka Ogwumike	United States	Los Angeles Sparks	Sancho Lyttle (6)	Spain	Atlanta Dream
2015	**Brittney Griner** (2)	United States	Phoenix Mercury	Kiah Stokes	United States	New York Liberty
2015	Angel McCoughtry (6)	United States	Atlanta Dream	DeWanna Bonner	United States	Phoenix Mercury
2015	Briann January (4)	United States	Indiana Fever	Tanisha Wright (6)	United States	New York Liberty
2016	Alana Beard (7)	United States	Los Angeles Sparks	Brittney Griner (3)	United States	Phoenix Mercury
2016	Angel McCoughtry (7)	United States	Atlanta Dream	Tamika Catchings (12)	United States	Indiana Fever
2016	Nneka Ogwumike (2)	United States	Los Angeles Sparks	Breanna Stewart	United States	Seattle Storm
2016	**Sylvia Fowles** (7)	United States	Minnesota Lynx	Tanisha Wright (7)	United States	New York Liberty
2016	Briann January (5)	United States	Indiana Fever	Jasmine Thomas	United States	Connecticut Sun
2017	**Alana Beard** (8)	United States	Los Angeles Sparks	Brittney Griner (4)	United States	Phoenix Mercury
2017	Tina Charles (4)	United States	New York Liberty	Rebekkah Brunson (6)	United States	Minnesota Lynx
2017	Nneka Ogwumike (3)	United States	Los Angeles Sparks	Maya Moore (2)	United States	Minnesota Lynx
2017	Sylvia Fowles (8)	United States	Minnesota Lynx	Briann January (6)	United States	Indiana Fever
2017	Jasmine Thomas (2)	United States	Connecticut Sun	Alyssa Thomas	United States	Connecticut Sun
2018	**Alana Beard** (9)	United States	Los Angeles Sparks	Sylvia Fowles (9)	United States	Minnesota Lynx
2018	Brittney Griner (5)	United States	Phoenix Mercury	Rebekkah Brunson (7)	United States	Minnesota Lynx
2018	Natasha Howard	United States	Seattle Storm	Nneka Ogwumike (4)	United States	Los Angeles Sparks
2018	Jessica Breland	United States	Atlanta Dream	Ariel Atkins	United States	Washington Mystics
2018	Jasmine Thomas (3)	United States	Connecticut Sun	Tiffany Hayes	United States	Atlanta Dream
2019	**Natasha Howard** (2)	United States	Seattle Storm	Brittney Griner (6)	United States	Phoenix Mercury
2019	Jonquel Jones	Bahamas	Connecticut Sun	Ariel Atkins (2)	United States	Washington Mystics
2019	Jasmine Thomas (4)	United States	Connecticut Sun	Alysha Clark	United States	Seattle Storm
2019	Nneka Ogwumike (5)	United States	Los Angeles Sparks	Alyssa Thomas (2)	United States	Connecticut Sun
2019	Jordin Canada	United States	Seattle Storm	Natasha Cloud	United States	Washington Mystics
2020	Alysha Clark (2)	United States	Seattle Storm	Breanna Stewart (2)	United States	Seattle Storm
2020	Betnijah Laney	United States	Atlanta Dream	Napheesa Collier	United States	Minnesota Lynx
2020	Brianna Turner	United States	Phoenix Mercury	Ariel Atkins (3)	United States	Washington Mystics
2020	Alyssa Thomas (3)	United States	Connecticut Sun	Brittney Sykes	United States	Los Angeles Sparks
2020	Elizabeth Williams	United States	Atlanta Dream	A'ja Wilson	United States	Las Vegas Aces
2021	Brittney Sykes (2)	United States	Los Angeles Sparks	Jasmine Thomas (5)	United States	Connecticut Sun
2021	Briann January (7)	United States	Connecticut Sun	Ariel Atkins (4)	United States	Washington Mystics
2021	Jonquel Jones (2)	Bahamas / Bosnia and Herzegovina	Connecticut Sun	Breanna Stewart (3)	United States	Seattle Storm
2021	Brianna Turner (2)	United States	Phoenix Mercury	Brionna Jones	United States	Connecticut Sun
2021	**Sylvia Fowles** (10)	United States	Minnesota Lynx	Brittney Griner (7)	United States	Phoenix Mercury
2022	Natasha Cloud (2)	United States	Washington Mystics	Brittney Sykes (3)	United States	Los Angeles Sparks
2022	Ariel Atkins (5)	United States	Washington Mystics	Gabby Williams	France	Seattle Storm
2022	**A'ja Wilson** (2)	United States	Las Vegas Aces	Alyssa Thomas (4)	United States	Connecticut Sun
2022	Breanna Stewart (4)	United States	Seattle Storm	Jonquel Jones (3)	Bahamas / Bosnia and Herzegovina	Connecticut Sun
2022	Sylvia Fowles (11)	United States	Minnesota Lynx	Ezi Magbegor	Australia	Seattle Storm
2023	**A'ja Wilson** (3)	United States	Las Vegas Aces	Betnijah Laney (2)	United States	New York Liberty
2023	Alyssa Thomas (5)	United States	Connecticut Sun	Ezi Magbegor (2)	Australia	Seattle Storm
2023	Brittney Sykes (4)	United States	Washington Mystics	Nneka Ogwumike (6)	United States	Los Angeles Sparks
2023	Breanna Stewart (5)	United States	New York Liberty	Napheesa Collier (2)	United States	Minnesota Lynx
2023	Jordin Canada (2)	United States	Los Angeles Sparks	Elizabeth Williams (2)	United States	Chicago Sky
2024	**Napheesa Collier** (3)	United States	Minnesota Lynx	Alyssa Thomas (6)	United States	Connecticut Sun
2024	A'ja Wilson (4)	United States	Las Vegas Aces	Alanna Smith	Australia	Minnesota Lynx
2024	Ezi Magbegor (3)	Australia	Seattle Storm	Nneka Ogwumike (7)	United States	Seattle Storm
2024	DiJonai Carrington	United States	Connecticut Sun	Jonquel Jones (4)	Bahamas / Bosnia and Herzegovina	New York Liberty
2024	Breanna Stewart (6)	United States	New York Liberty	Natasha Cloud (3)	United States	Phoenix Mercury
2025	Napheesa Collier (4)	United States	Minnesota Lynx	Aliyah Boston	United States	Indiana Fever
2025	**Alanna Smith** (2)	Australia	Minnesota Lynx	Veronica Burton	United States	Golden State Valkyries
2025	Alyssa Thomas (7)	United States	Phoenix Mercury	Rhyne Howard	United States	Atlanta Dream
2025	Gabby Williams (2)	France	Seattle Storm	Ezi Magbegor (4)	Australia	Seattle Storm
2025	**A'ja Wilson** (5)	United States	Las Vegas Aces	Breanna Stewart (7)	United States	New York Liberty
2026	Shakira Austin	United States	Washington Mystics	Veronica Burton (2)	United States	Golden State Valkyries
2026	Rhyne Howard (2)	United States	Atlanta Dream	Jordin Canada (3)	United States	Atlanta Dream
2026	**Angel Reese**	United States	Atlanta Dream	Sonia Citron	United States	Washington Mystics
2026	Gabby Williams (3)	France	Golden State Valkyries	Breanna Stewart (8)	United States	New York Liberty
2026	A'ja Wilson (6)	United States	Las Vegas Aces	Kiah Stokes (2)	United States	Golden State Valkyries
