= 2006 WNBA All-Star Game =

Exhibition basketball game

	1	2	3	4	Total
West	28	12	16	26	82
East	27	22	30	19	98
- Date: July 12, 2006
- Arena: Madison Square Garden
- City: New York, New York
- MVP: Katie Douglas
- Attendance: 12,998

WNBA All-Star Game
< 2005	2007 >

The 2006 WNBA All-Star Game was played on July 12, 2006, at Madison Square Garden in New York, New York, home of the New York Liberty. The game was the 7th annual WNBA All-Star Game. This was the third time New York has hosted the basketball showcase, after previously hosting the 1999 and 2003 games.

== The All-Star Game ==
=== Rosters ===
Western Conference All-Stars
Pos.	Player	Team	Selection #
Starters
PG	(United States) Dawn Staley	Houston Comets	5th
PG	(United States) Sue Bird	Seattle Storm	4th
SF	(United States) Sheryl Swoopes	Houston Comets	6th
PF	(Australia) Lauren Jackson	Seattle Storm	5th
C	(United States) Yolanda Griffith	Sacramento Monarchs	6th
Reserves
SG	(United States) Cappie Pondexter	Phoenix Mercury	1st
SG/SF	(United States) Diana Taurasi	Phoenix Mercury	2nd
SF	(United States) Seimone Augustus	Minnesota Lynx	1st
SF	(United States) Tina Thompson^{1}	Houston Comets	6th
SF	(Saint Vincent and the Grenadines) Sophia Young	San Antonio Silver Stars	1st
C	(United States) Lisa Leslie	Los Angeles Sparks	7th
C	(United States) Michelle Snow^{2}	Houston Comets	2nd

Eastern Conference All Stars
Pos.	Player	Team	Selection #
Starters
PG	(United States) Lindsay Whalen	Connecticut Sun	1st
PG	(United States) Becky Hammon^{1}	New York Liberty	3rd
SF	(United States) Nykesha Sales^{1}	Connecticut Sun	7th
SF	(United States) Tamika Catchings^{1}	Indiana Fever	4th
C	(Poland) Margo Dydek	Connecticut Sun	2nd
Reserves
SG	(United States) Alana Beard^{3}	Washington Mystics	2nd
SG	(United States) Deanna Nolan	Detroit Shock	3rd
SG	(United States) Katie Smith	Detroit Shock	6th
SG/SF	(United States) Katie Douglas^{3}	Connecticut Sun	1st
PF	(United States) Cheryl Ford^{3}	Detroit Shock	3rd
PF	(United States) Tamika Whitmore	Indiana Fever	1st
PF	(United States) Candice Dupree^{2}	Chicago Sky	1st
PF/C	(United States) Taj McWilliams-Franklin^{2}	Connecticut Sun	5th
C	(United States) Tangela Smith^{2}	Charlotte Sting	1st

- ^{1} Injured
- ^{2} Injury replacement
- ^{3} Starting in place of injured player

ESPN

July 12
7:30 p.m.

Western Conference 82, Eastern Conference 98
Pts: Seimone Augustus 16; Rebs: Michelle Snow 11; Asts: Staley, Swoopes, Pondexter 4	Pts: Katie Douglas 16; Rebs: Margo Dydek 9 Asts: Deanna Nolan 7

Madison Square Garden, New York, New York
Attendance: 12,998
Referees:
1. 10 Bob Trammel, #22 June Corteau, #30 Lisa Mattingsly

=== Coaches ===
The coach for the Western Conference was Sacramento Monarchs coach John Whisenant. The coach for the Eastern Conference was Connecticut Sun coach Mike Thibault.

== Other events ==
=== Three-Point Shootout ===
The inaugural Three-Point Shootout was held before the All-Star Game. Contestants shot 25 balls from 5 locations around the three-point line, with each shot counting for one point except for one "money ball" on each rack counting for two points.

Contestants
Pos.	Player	Team	Made	Att.	Pct.	1st	2nd
PG	(United States) Dawn Staley	Houston Comets	53	124	.427	19	17
SF	(United States) Katie Douglas	Connecticut Sun	73	173	.422	14	16
SF	(United States) Katie Smith	Detroit Shock	59	161	.366	13	
SF	(United States) Diana Taurasi	Phoenix Mercury	121	305	.397	9	

=== Skills Challenge ===
Contestants
Pos.	Player	Team	Ht.	Wt.	1st	2nd
SF	(United States) Seimone Augustus	Minnesota Lynx	6–0	179	38.1	28.5
PG	(United States) Sue Bird	Seattle Storm	5–9	150	29.2	33.2
SG	(United States) Cappie Pondexter	Phoenix Mercury	5–9	160	39.0	
SG	(United States) Deanna Nolan	Detroit Shock	5-11	144	40.8	
