= 2027 WNBA All-Star Game =

Exhibition basketball game

- Date: July 31, 2027
- Arena: Chase Center
- City: San Francisco, California, United States
- Network: ABC

WNBA All-Star Game
< 2026	2028 >

The 2027 WNBA All-Star Game is an exhibition professional basketball game scheduled for July 31, 2027, at Chase Center, in San Francisco, California, United States. The Golden State Valkyries will host the game and related events for the first time in franchise history, during only their third year in existence, as announced on August 18, 2026.

In addition to the All-Star Game on Saturday, July 31, 2027, the event will include the Shooting Stars Contest (as debuted in 2026) and 3-Point Contest on Friday, July 30, all at Chase Center. Other events including WNBA Live, fan activations, viewing parties, and community events will also occur at the Moscone Center, Sephora Performance Center in Oakland, and other locations across the region.

== Rosters ==
Voting for the 2027 All-Star roster will occur during the first half of the 2027 season, typically in June.
