= Mohegan Sun Arena =

Multi-purpose arena in Connecticut, United States

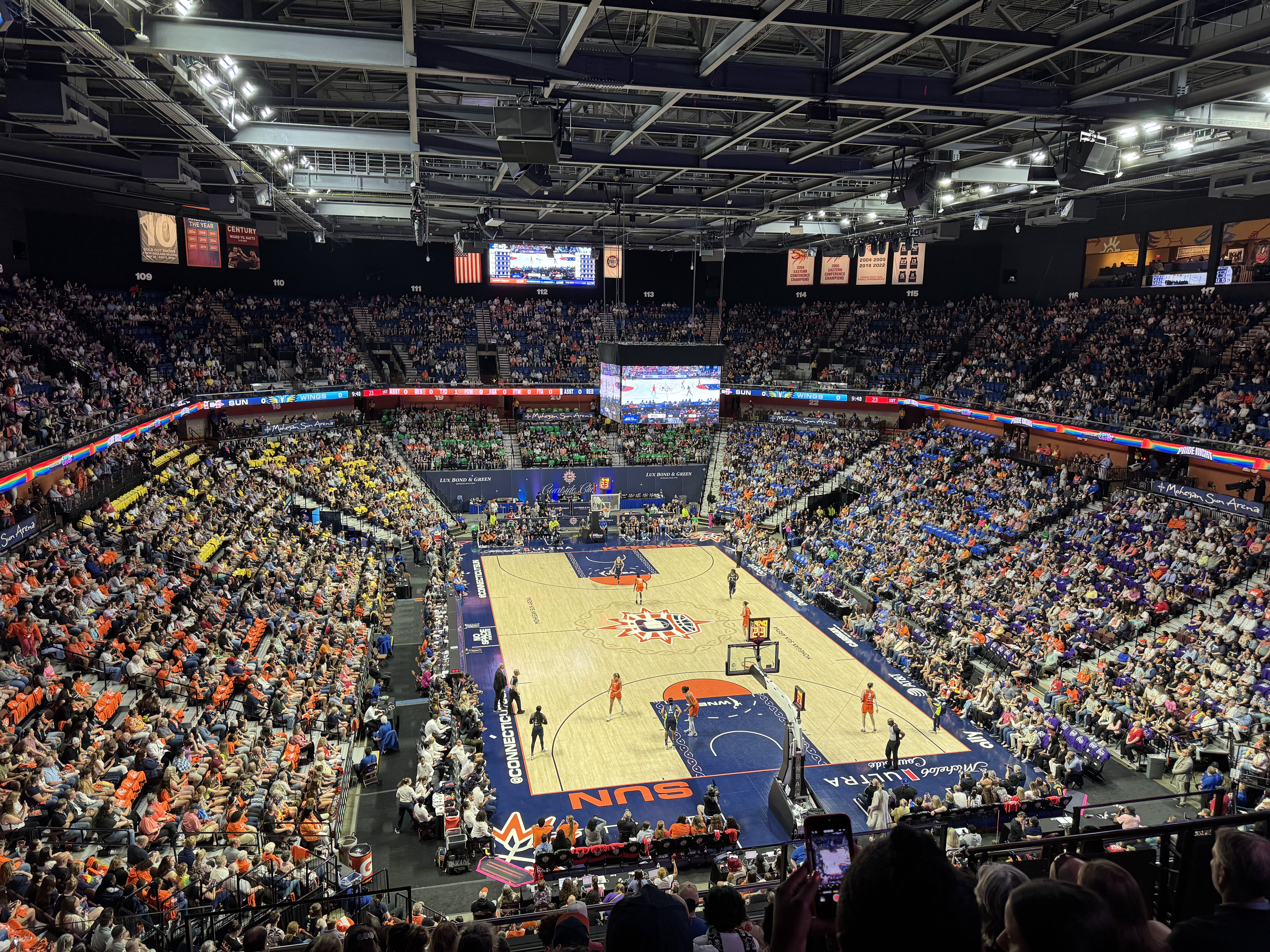
- Mohegan Sun Arena in 2025

- Location within Connecticut Location within the United States
- Address: 1 Mohegan Sun Boulevard
- Location: Uncasville, Connecticut, U.S.
- Coordinates: 41°29′28″N 72°5′23″W
- Operator: Mohegan Sun
- Capacity: Basketball: 9,323; Concerts: 10,000; Lacrosse: 7,074

Construction
- Opened: October 2001

Tenants
- Mohegan Wolves (AF2) (2002–2003); Connecticut Sun (WNBA) (2003–2026); New England Black Wolves (NLL) (2015–2020)

Website
- mohegansun.com

The Mohegan Sun Arena is a 10,000-seat multi-purpose arena in the Uncasville area of Montville, Connecticut, located inside the Mohegan Sun casino resort. The arena facility features 30,000 square feet (2,800 m^{2}) of configurable exhibition space and a 400-foot (120 m) clear span. It was built by the Perini Building Company and opened in October 2001. The arena was home to the Connecticut Sun of the Women's National Basketball Association (WNBA) from 2003 to 2026.

== History ==
The multi-purpose facility has hosted a wide variety of events; including the American Kennel Club, WWE, concerts from major classical, country, jazz, metal, rap, rock, and pop acts, as well as sporting events such as PBR events, Bellator, NCAA games, PBA tournaments, early UFC bouts, and the World's Strongest Man Super Series Competition. The largest event on record to have been held at the arena was the inaugural Barrett-Jackson collector car auction in the Northeast in 2016, for which 90,000 tickets were sold to the multi-day event.

Major network and cable television broadcasting companies, including CBS, NBC, ABC, FOX, ESPN, and CNN have all produced events through this arena.

=== Arena football ===
The arena originally served as home of the Mohegan Wolves arena football team until it was sold and moved to Manchester, New Hampshire in 2004. On July 19, 2001, Uncasville was awarded an AF2 expansion team. On December 12, 2001, Mohegan Sun and Dr. Eric Margenau, President/Chief Executive Officer of United Sports Ventures, announced that the new expansion AF2 franchise would be named the Mohegan Wolves. Margenau introduced Gary Porter, as the head coach for the team that would first take the field April 5, 2002 at the Mohegan Sun Arena against the Albany Conquest. Gary Porter previously led the expansion Peoria Pirates to a 7–9 record in 2001.

The team name was selected through a "Name the Team" contest sponsored by WCTY, Mohegan Sun and X-Tra Mart. A Jewett City resident, came up with the winning name. The winner won four season tickets for the 2002 Mohegan Wolves season, dinner for four on the night of the team's first home game, and a team merchandise package.

=== Basketball ===
On January 28, 2003, the arena was announced as the official home court for the Connecticut Sun. Prior to the fall of 2002, the NBA operating model precluded any WNBA team without an NBA "brother" counterpart. By the time the Connecticut Sun moved in, Val Ackerman was the WNBA president and Mark L. Brown was the chairman of the Mohegan Tribe. Though sports betting was legalized in Connecticut on October 1, 2021, the casino has suspended WNBA betting from its sportsbook operation.

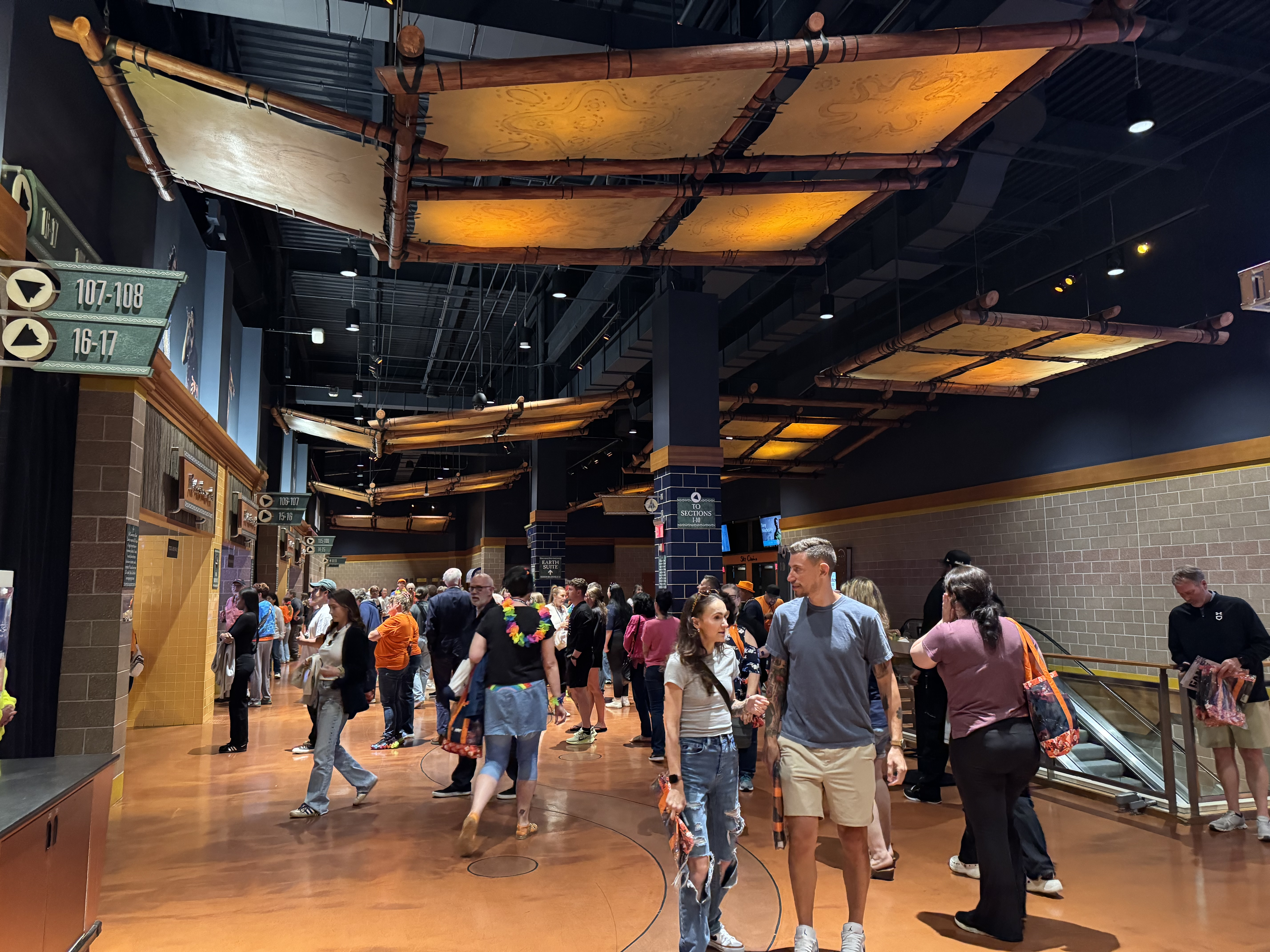
Mohegan Sun Arena concourse

On September 8, 2005, as a companion to the arena, the Mohegan Sun casino opened a Connecticut Sun merchandise store called "Winter Essentials." It was the first store in the United States that sold professional basketball goods on casino ground. However, the store was closed when the casino underwent renovations in 2008. Connecticut Sun merchandise would be available in the Arena during games between 2009 and 2019.

The Connecticut Sun were not able to play at the arena in the 2020 season, as the entire season was relocated to IMG Academy in Bradenton, Florida due to the COVID-19 pandemic in Connecticut. After the conclusion of the 2020 WNBA season, the arena began holding its first events since the pandemic declaration in November 2020, when it hosted a series of college basketball games where fans were not permitted. The event was called Bubbleville.

The final Connecticut Sun game at the arena took place on September 24, 2026, a 95–81 win against the Toronto Tempo in front of 8,911 fans. The Connecticut Sun was then relocated to Houston, Texas following the 2026 season where they will now play as the revived Houston Comets beginning with the 2027 season where they will play at the Toyota Center once again for the first time since 2008.

=== Lacrosse ===
On April 21, 2002, the Mohegan Sun Arena hosted the 2002 National Lacrosse League All-Star Game. The North Division (Calgary Roughnecks, Montreal Express, Ottawa Rebel, Rochester Knighthawks, Toronto Rock, Vancouver Ravens) defeated the South (Albany Attack, Buffalo Bandits, Columbus Landsharks, New Jersey Storm, New York Saints, Philadelphia Wings, Washington Power) by a score of 14–10. Steve Toll, of the Toronto Rock, was named the MVP of the event.

On August 5, 2014, the National Lacrosse League announced that the Philadelphia Wings would move to the Mohegan Sun Arena and be re-branded as the New England Black Wolves for the 2015 season. In their home opener, the Black Wolves defeated the Buffalo Bandits 12–8 in front of 5,768.

The team relocated in 2021 and now play as the Albany FireWolves.

==== Attendance history ====
Attendance
Season	Attendance
2015	5,768
2016	5,589
2017	7,074
2018	6,158
2019	6,445

=== Mixed martial arts ===
On January 11, 2002, Mohegan Sun Arena hosted its first MMA event, UFC 35, headlined by Jens Pulver vs. B.J. Penn. UFC 45, headlined by Matt Hughes vs. Frank Trigg, was held at the arena on November 21, 2003.

Bellator MMA consistently held events at the arena until the closure of the promotion in 2023.

- 2009: Bellator 2, Bellator 11
- 2010: Bellator 15
- 2011: Bellator 39, Bellator 48
- 2012: Bellator 63
- 2013: Bellator 98
- 2014: Bellator 110, Bellator 123
- 2015: Bellator 134, Bellator 140, Bellator 144
- 2016: Bellator 153, Bellator 163
- 2017: Bellator 178, Bellator 185
- 2018: Bellator 194, Bellator 207
- 2019: Bellator 215, Bellator 216
- 2021: Bellator 262
- 2022: Bellator 289

=== Professional wrestling ===
The arena has hosted various WWE and All Elite Wrestling events, including frequently hosted episodes of Raw, SmackDown, and Rampage.

=== Bare-knuckle boxing ===
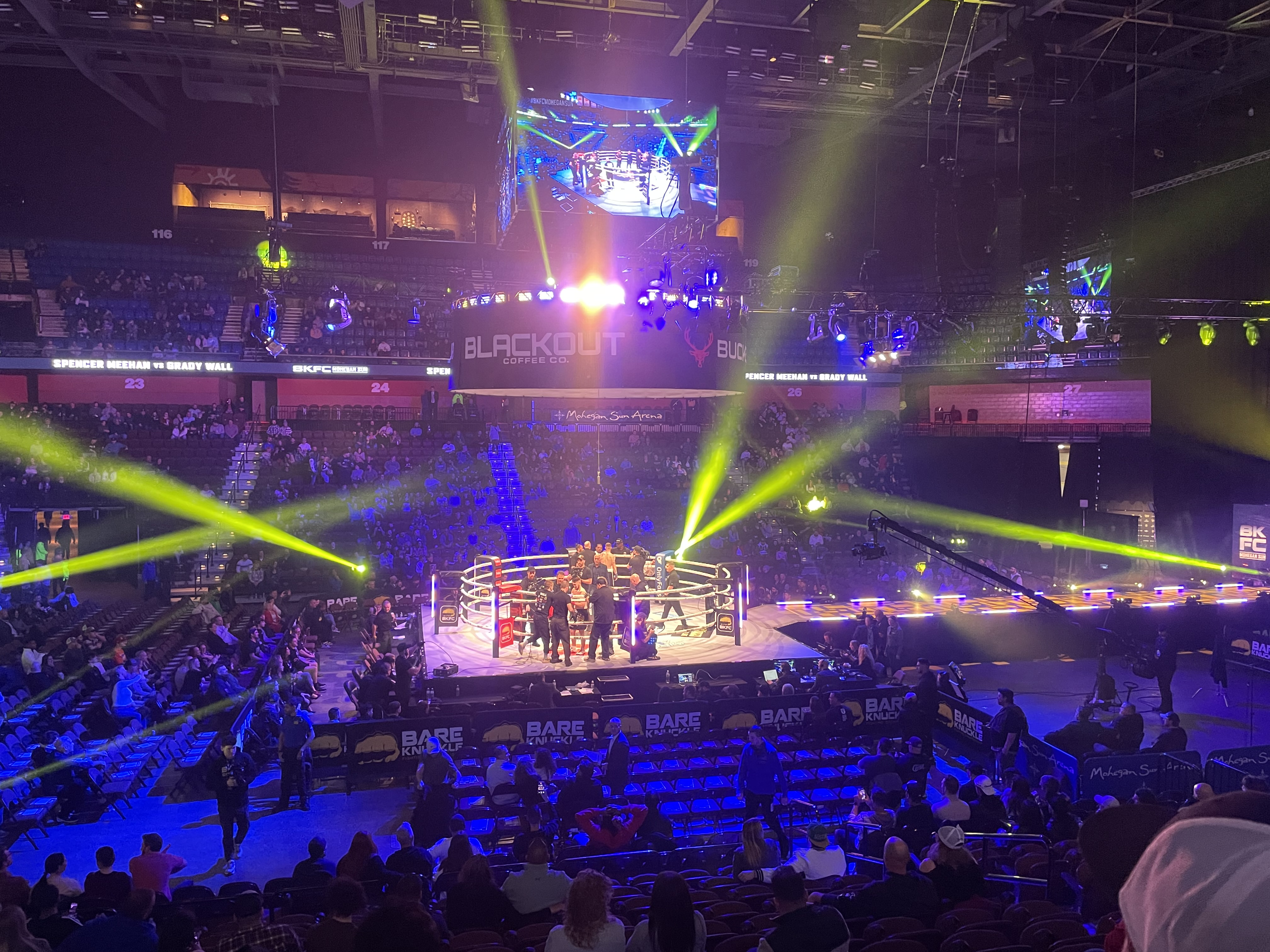
Mohegan Sun Arena during a BKFC event in 2025

The arena has hosted 3 Bare Knuckle Fighting Championship events. The first being BKFC 61 Connecticut: Rivera vs. Straus, BKFC on DAZN Mohegan Sun: Lane vs. VanCamp. and most recently BKFC Fight Night Mohegan Sun: Porter vs. Cleckler.

== Seating ==
As of 2006, the seating can be configured into 5 common sports configurations: basketball, boxing, bowling, rodeo, table tennis, lacrosse. It also can be reconfigured to fit regular, fullhouse, centerstage, and halfhouse concerts. The arena was awarded the 2008 and 2010 Country Music Award for "Casino of the Year". It was also ranked the 4th best venue by Billboard Magazine.

== Notable events ==
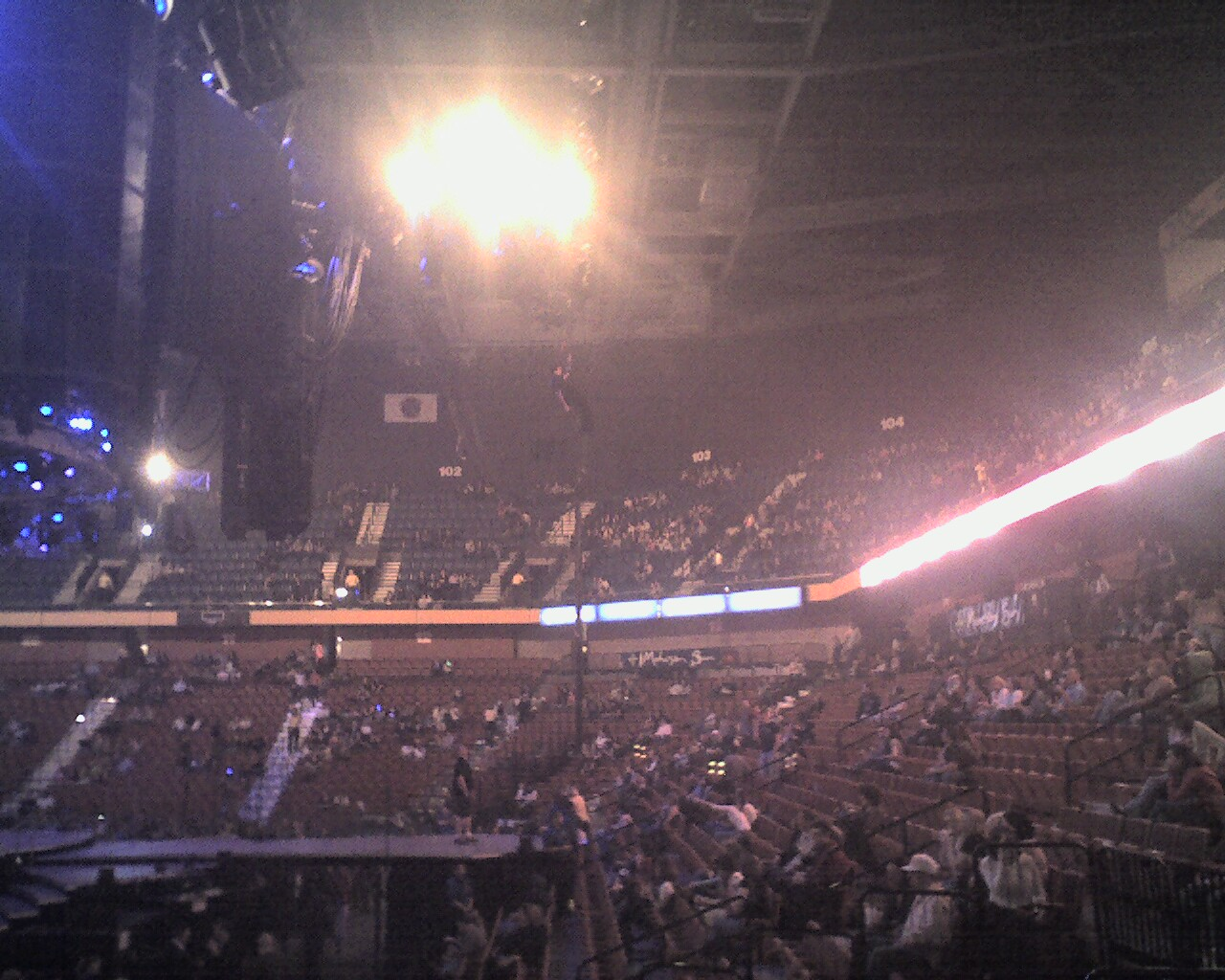
Mohegan Sun Arena

- WNBA All-Star Game – 2005, 2009, 2010, 2013, 2015
- National Lacrosse League 2002 All-Star Game.
- American Athletic Conference women's basketball tournament (2014–2020)
- Kellogg's Tour of Gymnastics Champions (2012, 2016 and 2024)
- Miss America (2019-2022)
- Big East women's basketball tournament (2021 and beyond)
- Naismith Memorial Basketball Hall of Fame 2020 enshrinement ceremony – May 15, 2021

=== NBA games ===
Date	Home	Score	Away	Game Type	Attendance
October 11, 2014	Boston Celtics	80–92	New York Knicks	Preseason	9,252
October 8, 2016	Boston Celtics	104–86	Charlotte Hornets	Preseason	8,052

=== Strength Athletics Grand Prix ===
Between 2005 and 2010, the arena hosted one of the premier international strongman Grand Prix events.

Year	Champion	Runner-up	3rd Place	Event name
2005	(Poland) Mariusz Pudzianowski	(Canada) Jessen Paulin	(United States) Don Pope	Mohegan Sun Grand Prix; Final of WSM Super Series 2005
2006	(Poland) Mariusz Pudzianowski	(United States) Jesse Marunde	(United States) Josh Thigpen	Mohegan Sun Grand Prix; Final of WSM Super Series 2006
2007	(Poland) Mariusz Pudzianowski	(United States) Kevin Nee	(United Kingdom) Mark Felix	Mohegan Sun Grand Prix; Start of WSM Super Series 2007
2008	(United States) Derek Poundstone	(Poland) Mariusz Pudzianowski	(United Kingdom) Terry Hollands	Mohegan Sun Grand Prix; Start of WSM Super Series 2008
2009	(United States) Derek Poundstone	(United States) Travis Ortmayer	(United States) Brian Shaw	Mohegan Sun Grand Prix 2009; May 17, 2009; Start of Giants Live 2009
2010	(United States) Derek Poundstone	(United States) Brian Shaw	(Bulgaria) Stojan Todorchev	Mohegan Sun Grand Prix 2010; April 25, 2010; Start of WSM Super Series 2010

Events and tenants
Preceded by first arena	Home of the Mohegan Wolves; 2002–2003	Succeeded by Verizon Wireless Arena
Preceded by TD Waterhouse Centre	Home of the Connecticut Sun; 2003 – 2026	Succeeded by Toyota Center
Preceded by Radio City Music Hall	Host of the WNBA All-Star Game; 2005	Succeeded by Madison Square Garden
Preceded by Verizon Center	Host of the WNBA All-Star Game; 2009	Succeeded by unknown
Preceded by MGM Grand Garden Arena	Ultimate Fighting Championship venue UFC 35	Succeeded by MGM Grand Garden Arena
