= Katie Douglas (basketball) =

American basketball player (born 1979)

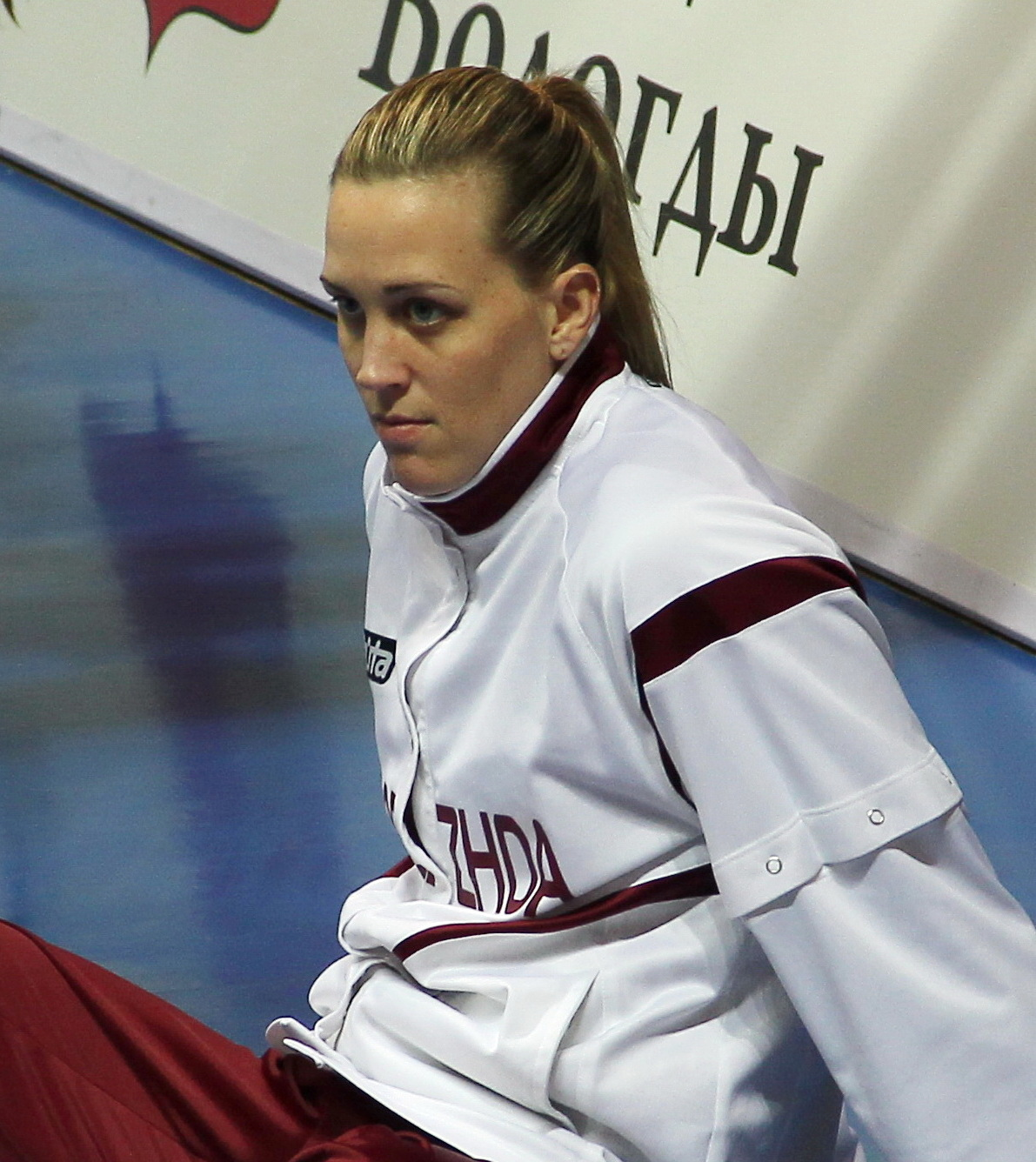
- Douglas in 2012

Personal information
- Born: May 7, 1979 (age 47) Indianapolis, Indiana, U.S.
- Listed height: 6 ft 0 in (1.83 m)
- Listed weight: 165 lb (75 kg)

Career information
- High school: Perry Meridian (Indianapolis, Indiana)
- College: Purdue (1997–2001)
- WNBA draft: 2001: 1st round, 10th overall pick
- Drafted by: Orlando Miracle
- Playing career: 2001–2014
- Position: Shooting guard / small forward

Career history
- 2001–2007: Orlando Miracle / Connecticut Sun
- 2002–2003: Ano Liosia Basketball
- 2003–2004: S.U. Glyfada Esperides Kyklos
- 2004–2007: Lietuvos telekomas / TEO Vilnius
- 2007–2008: Ros Casares Valencia
- 2008–2013: Indiana Fever
- 2008–2009: CSKA Moscow
- 2009–2010: Galatasaray
- 2010–2011: Ros Casares Valencia
- 2011–2012: Nadezhda Orenburg
- 2012–2013: Wisła Can-Pack Kraków
- 2014: Connecticut Sun

Career highlights
- WNBA champion (2012); 5× WNBA All-Star (2006, 2007, 2009, 2011, 2014); WNBA All-Star Game MVP (2006); All-WNBA First Team (2006); 2× All-WNBA Second Team (2007, 2009); 4× WNBA All-Defensive First Team (2005–2007, 2011); WNBA All-Defensive Second Team (2010); WNBA Three-Point Contest champion (2010); No. 23 retired by Connecticut Sun; Turkish Cup winner (2011); Queen's Cup winner (2008); NCAA champion (1999); First-team All-American – AP (2001); Second-team All-American – AP (2000); 2× All-American – Kodak, USBWA (2000, 2001); Big Ten Female Athlete of the Year (2001); 2× Big Ten co-Player of the Year (2000, 2001); Chicago Tribune Silver Basketball (2001); 2× First-team All-Big Ten (2000, 2001)
- Stats at WNBA.com
- Stats at Basketball Reference
Medals
Women's basketball
Representing USA
World University Games
Silver medal – second place	1999 Palma de Mallorca	Team competition

Kathryn Elizabeth Douglas (born May 7, 1979) is an American former professional basketball player. Her primary position was shooting guard, her secondary was small forward. She was known league-wide as one of the most prominent two-way players for her long-range shooting and high scoring abilities on offense as well as her defensive abilities.

In the WNBA, she has been a multiple time WNBA All-Star and has been a selection to both the All-WNBA Team and WNBA All-Defensive First Team. She won WNBA Championship with the Indiana Fever in 2012. In 2023, she was inducted into the Indiana Basketball Hall of Fame. While at Purdue University, she helped lead the team to an NCAA Women's Division I Basketball Championship in 1999.

== College years ==
After attending Perry Meridian High School in Indianapolis, Douglas attended Purdue University and graduated in 2001 as a communications major. She helped lead Purdue to an NCAA Women's Division I Basketball Championship in 1999 and was a two-time Kodak All-America in 2000 and 2001, as well as being named to the 1999 and 2001 NCAA Women's Final Four All-Tournament Team. She shared Big Ten Conference Player of the Year honors in 2000 with Helen Darling, and in 2001 was the unanimous Big Ten Player of the Year and winner of the Silver Basketball from the Chicago Tribune. Douglas also received the 2001 Big Ten Conference Suzy Favor Award, which is given to the conference's female athlete of the year across all sports. Douglas played at Purdue for head coaches Carolyn Peck and Kristy Curry.

=== Purdue statistics ===
Legend
GP	Games played	GS	Games started	MPG	Minutes per game
FG%	Field goal percentage	3P%	3-point field goal percentage	FT%	Free throw percentage
RPG	Rebounds per game	APG	Assists per game	SPG	Steals per game
BPG	Blocks per game	PPG	Points per game	**Bold**	Career high

Year	Team	GP	Points	FG%	3P%	FT%	RPG	APG	SPG	BPG	PPG
1997-98	Purdue	33	285	44.9%	25.0%	75.4%	4.3	3.7	1.9	0.4	8.6
1998-99	Purdue	35	493	46.5%	34.9%	81.8%	6.2	3.5	2.6	0.5	14.1
1999-00	Purdue	30	**613**	42.5%	32.4%	**82.8%**	**6.5**	**4.7**	2.4	**0.6**	**20.4**
2000-01	Purdue	**37**	574	**44.7%**	**35.8%**	77.6%	4.7	3.7	**2.7**	0.5	15.5
Career	Purdue	135	1965	44.5%	34.3%	79.8%	5.4	3.9	2.4	0.5	14.6

== USA Basketball ==
Douglas played on the team presenting the US at the 1999 World University Games held in Palma de Mallorca, Spain. The team had a 4–2 record and earned the silver medal. Douglas was the leading scorer on the USA team with 17.6 points per game.

== WNBA career ==
Douglas was selected the 10th overall pick by the Orlando Miracle in the 2001 WNBA draft. She remained with the franchise even when the Miracle relocated to Uncasville, Connecticut, and was renamed the Connecticut Sun prior to the 2003 season. Before becoming an all-star in the league, Douglas earned some WNBA Finals experience early in her career while the Connecticut Sun were championship contenders in both the 2004 and 2005 seasons. The Sun made it to the finals in both seasons but would lose both times to the Seattle Storm and Sacramento Monarchs respectively. Following the 2005 WNBA season, Douglas had a breakout year in 2006, averaging 16.4 ppg and being voted as a WNBA all-star for the first time. Douglas was named to the WNBA All-Defensive First Team and received the Most Valuable Player award in the 2006 WNBA All-Star Game.

In 2007, Douglas ranked 5th in the league in steals (65), 7th in scoring (577), and 12th in assists (125). Douglas was again selected for the WNBA All-Defensive First Team.

On February 19, 2008, the Connecticut Sun traded Douglas to her hometown team, the Indiana Fever, for Tamika Whitmore and the Fever's first-round pick in the 2008 WNBA Draft; she would play alongside superstar small forward Tamika Catchings. She would have a solid season in her first year with the team by averaging 15.6 ppg, but unexpectedly struggled in the playoffs, averaging only 7.3 ppg. The Fever had gotten eliminated in the first round 2–1 by the Detroit Shock. In the 2009 season, Douglas would have the best season of her career, she had back-to-back 30+ point games, becoming the first player in franchise history to do so. She also scored a career high and franchise record, 34 points in a regular season game win against the Washington Mystics and averaged a career-high 17.6 ppg. Douglas would be voted into the 2009 WNBA All-Star Game. The Fever would make it to the finals that year, but lost 3–2 to the Phoenix Mercury. A few seasons later, Douglas would win her first WNBA Championship with the Indiana Fever in 2012 as they had beat the Minnesota Lynx 3–1. It was her fourth career WNBA Finals appearance, although she was sidelined for the series after sustaining an ankle injury during the Eastern Conference Finals. With a few seconds left in the final game of the series at home and the Fever with a comfortable lead, Douglas was subbed in while the crowd was giving a standing ovation. En route to her first championship, Douglas had another great year during the 2012 season, averaging 16.5 ppg. In a regular season game win against the Atlanta Dream, Douglas scored 29 points along with a franchise-record 7 three-pointers.

Douglas wouldn't see much playing time in the 2013 season, missing a huge bulk of the season due to a lower back injury and playing a total of only 4 games. The injury would also cause her to miss the playoffs. This season would be Douglas's last season with the Fever as she became an unrestricted free agent.

On March 24, 2014, Douglas returned to the Connecticut Sun in free agency, signing a 2-year deal with a third-year option. She had another productive season averaging 13.1 ppg and was voted into the WNBA all-star game for the fifth time in her career. Despite her stats, the Sun finished last place in the Eastern Conference.

On May 1, 2015, Douglas announced her retirement after 14 seasons in the WNBA.

Among the WNBA all-time leaders, Douglas ranks 16th in regular season scoring, 6th in regular season 3-pointers made, 5th in regular season steals, 10th in playoff scoring, 4th in playoff 3-pointers made and 4th in playoff steals.

== WNBA career statistics ==
Legend
GP	Games played	GS	Games started	MPG	Minutes per game	RPG	Rebounds per game
APG	Assists per game	SPG	Steals per game	BPG	Blocks per game	PPG	Points per game
TO	Turnovers per game	FG%	Field-goal percentage	3P%	3-point field-goal percentage	FT%	Free-throw percentage
**Bold**	Career best	°	League leader

†	Denotes seasons in which Douglas won a WNBA championship

=== Regular season ===
Year	Team	GP	GS	MPG	FG%	3P%	FT%	RPG	APG	SPG	BPG	TO	PPG
2001	Orlando	22	0	20.0	.362	.316	.723	2.3	1.8	1.7	0.3	2.00	7.0
2002	Orlando	32	30	25.9	.449	.367	.866	4.2	1.7	1.5	0.4	1.31	8.5
2003	Connecticut	28	27	30.1	.438	.382	.721	3.8	2.0	1.1	0.4	**1.00**	12.0
2004	Connecticut	**34**	**34**	32.9	.389	.346	.792	3.9	2.6	1.5	0.4	1.53	10.7
2005	Connecticut	32	32	31.2	.413	.282	.774	4.1	2.9	1.5	0.1	1.69	11.0
2006	Connecticut	32	32	31.3	.443	.422	.839	3.8	2.5	**1.9**	0.1	2.28	16.4
2007	Connecticut	**34**	**34**	33.3	.428	.338	.779	**4.6**	**3.7**	**1.9**	0.3	2.79	17.0
2008	Indiana	33	33	**34.4**	.371	.324	.799	4.1	3.2	1.6	0.3	3.03	15.6
2009	Indiana	31	31	32.4	.410	.349	.861	3.9	2.7	1.8	0.2	2.42	**17.6**
2010	Indiana	**34**	**34**	29.8	.449	.391	.831	3.4	3.3	1.4	0.4	1.97	13.7
2011	Indiana	32	32	29.4	**.465**	**.440**	.671	3.9	2.8	1.3	0.3	2.03	13.9
2012^{†}	Indiana	32	32	30.9	.413	.423	.844	3.8	2.2	1.5	0.3	1.66	16.5
2013	Indiana	4	4	35.8	.389	.259	**1.000**	2.8	1.5	1.8	**0.5**	2.75	15.0
2014	Connecticut	32	32	32.5	.358	.356	.848	3.3	2.2	0.9	0.4	2.22	13.1
Career	14 years, 3 teams	412	387	30.7	.415	.367	.805	3.8	2.6	1.5	0.3	2.05	13.5

=== Postseason ===
Year	Team	GP	GS	MPG	FG%	3P%	FT%	RPG	APG	SPG	BPG	TO	PPG
2003	Connecticut	4	4	31.5	.333	.250	.857	2.5	3.0	0.8	0.2	**0.25**	7.3
2004	Connecticut	8	8	33.5	.348	.297	**.926**	4.0	2.8	1.2	0.0	2.00	10.3
2005	Connecticut	8	8	34.8	**.463**	.395	.655	4.6	2.3	1.4	0.1	1.00	12.0
2006	Connecticut	4	4	31.3	.400	.296	.800	3.8	2.5	1.0	0.2	2.75	12.0
2007	Connecticut	3	3	**38.0**	.346	.286	.889	**5.3**	3.3	**3.3**°	0.0	5.00	17.3
2008	Indiana	3	3	31.0	.318	.125	.700	2.3	2.3	1.3	**0.7**	3.33	7.3
2009	Indiana	**10**	**10**	36.1	.362	.310	.814	3.5	**4.0**	1.4	0.6	1.90	15.5
2010	Indiana	3	3	31.7	.458	.333	.833	3.0	3.3	1.3	0.3	1.00	11.7
2011	Indiana	6	6	33.5	.426	**.436**	.840	5.0	2.7	0.8	0.2	2.17	**19.7**
2012^{†}	Indiana	7	6	24.6	.455	.355	.750	2.0	1.3	1.0	0.0	1.57	13.3
2013	Indiana	Did not play (season-ending injury)											
**Career**	10 years, 2 teams	56	55	32.7	.395	.331	.803	3.7	2.8	1.3	0.2	1.91	13.0

== Overseas career ==
From her second year to her thirteenth year in the WNBA, Douglas played overseas every off-season. Douglas went to Greece to play for Ano Liosia Basketball in the 2002-03 off-season. Douglas played in Greece once again for S.U. Glyfada Esperides Kyklos the following off-season. From 2004 to 2007, Douglas played three off-seasons in Lithuania for Lietuvos telekomas / TEO Vilnius. In the 2007-08 off-season, Douglas played for Ros Casares Valencia of the Spanish League. In the 2008-09 off-season, Douglas played for CSKA Moscow before the team folded the same year. Douglas played for Galatasaray of the Turkish League during the 2009-10 off-season with then Indiana Fever teammate Tamika Catchings. Douglas returned to Spain to play once again for Ros Casares Valencia in the 2010-11 off-season. In the 2011-12 off-season, Douglas played for Nadezhda Orenburg in the Russian League and finished off her overseas career playing in Poland for WBC Wisła Kraków in the 2012-13 off-season.

== Personal life ==
Douglas lost both her parents to cancer; her father in 1997 and her mother less than three years later in 2000. She was awarded the first-ever Jim V Foundation Comeback of the Year Award in 2001 for her perseverance after a string of tragic, personal losses.

One week after the 2005 WNBA Finals loss to the Sacramento Monarchs, Douglas married Vasilis Giapalakis in Athens, Greece. Giapalakis is a sports agent who represents male and female basketball players. Douglas, who played for a Lithuanian basketball team in the WNBA offseason, met Giapalakis when she was playing for a Greek club. The couple divorced a few years later.

In July 2015, just a couple months after her retirement, Douglas married Fred Poe, who is an owner of a fence company named K & K Fence Co. Douglas and her husband have a second in home in Fort Myers, Florida.

== Business ventures ==
In 2017, Douglas opened an Orangetheory Fitness franchise fitness center in Greenwood, Indiana.

== Awards and achievements ==
- 2005 WNBA All-Defensive First Team
- 2006 All-WNBA First Team, WNBA All-Defensive First Team, WNBA All-Star Selection (MVP)
- 2007 All-WNBA Second Team, WNBA All-Defensive First Team, WNBA All-Star Selection
- 2009 All-WNBA Second Team, WNBA All-Star Selection
- 2010 All-WNBA Second Team, WNBA All-Defensive Second Team
- 2011 WNBA All-Defensive Second Team, WNBA All-Star Selection
- Number 23 retired by the Connecticut Sun.
