= Angel McCoughtry =

American basketball player (born 1986)

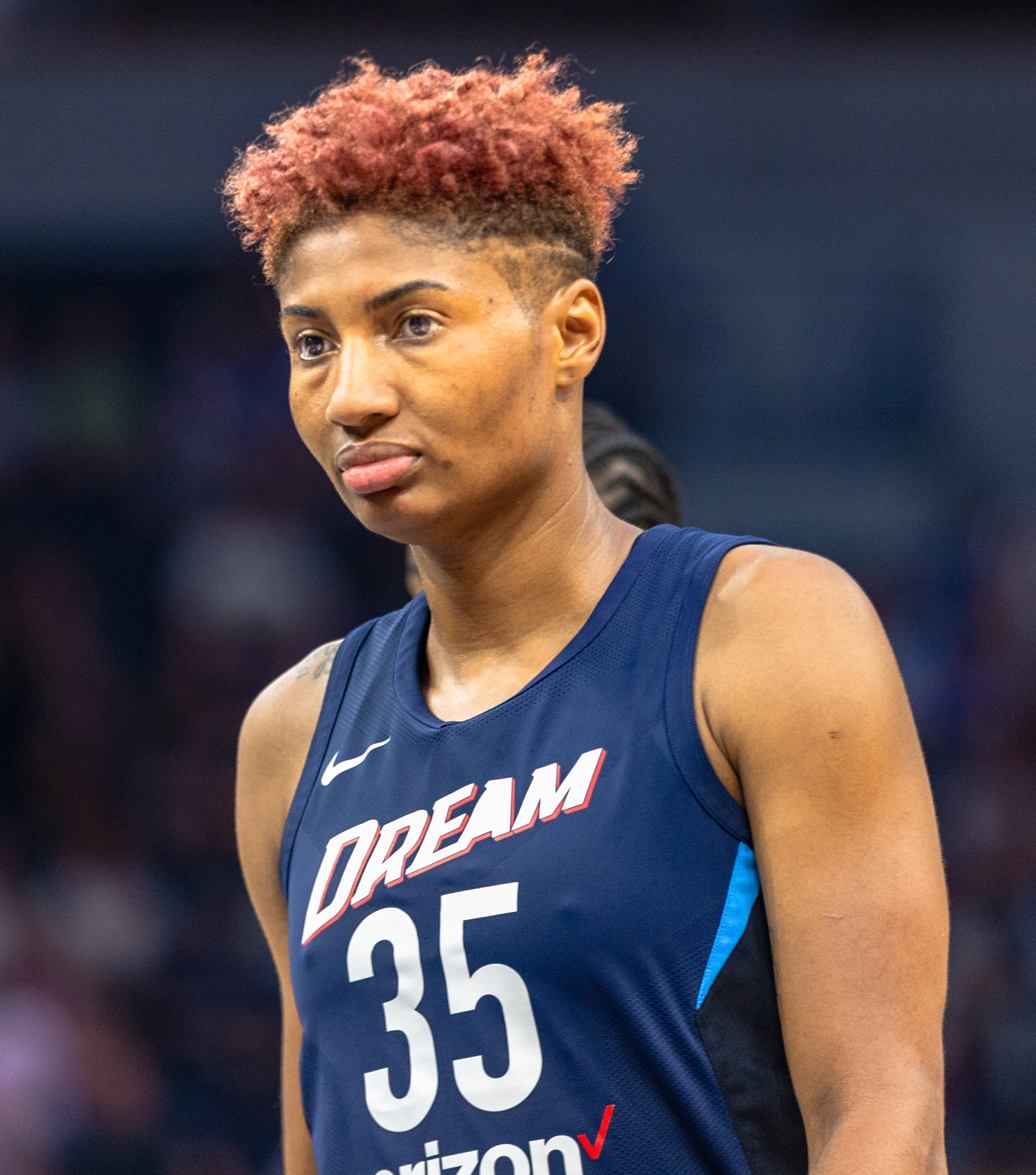
- McCoughtry in 2018

Personal information
- Born: September 10, 1986 (age 40) Baltimore, Maryland, U.S.
- Listed height: 6 ft 1 in (1.85 m)
- Listed weight: 177 lb (80 kg)

Career information
- High school: Saint Frances Academy (Baltimore, Maryland); The Patterson School (Lenoir, North Carolina)
- College: Louisville (2005–2009)
- WNBA draft: 2009: 1st round, 1st overall pick
- Drafted by: Atlanta Dream
- Playing career: 2009–2022
- Position: Small forward / shooting guard
- Number: 35

Career history
- 2009–2016, 2018–2019: Atlanta Dream
- 2009–2010: Good Angels Košice
- 2010–2011: MKB-Euroleasing Sopron
- 2011–2015: Fenerbahçe Istanbul
- 2015–2016: Mersin BŞB
- 2016–2017: Dynamo Kursk
- 2017: Homenetmen Antelias
- 2017–2018: Dynamo Kursk
- 2020–2021: Las Vegas Aces
- 2021: Galatasaray
- 2022: Minnesota Lynx

Career highlights
- 5× WNBA All-Star (2011, 2013–2015, 2018); 2× All-WNBA First Team (2011, 2015); 4× All-WNBA Second Team (2010, 2013, 2014, 2016); 2× WNBA scoring champion (2012, 2013); 2× WNBA steals leader (2012, 2014); 2× WNBA Peak Performer (2012, 2013); 7× WNBA All-Defensive First Team (2010–2016); WNBA All-Defensive Second Team (2009); WNBA Rookie of the Year (2009); WNBA All-Rookie Team (2009); WNBA 25th Anniversary Team (2021); Hungarian National League champion (2011); Hungarian Cup winner (2011); 2× Turkish National League champion (2012, 2013); Turkish Cup winner (2015); 4× Turkish President Cup winner (2012–2015); EuroLeague winner (2017); Lebanese Basketball League champion (2017); First-team All-American – AP (2009); 2× All-American – USBWA (2008, 2009); 3× Kodak/State Farm Coaches' All-American (2007–2009); 2× Second-team All-American – AP (2007, 2008); Big East Defensive Player of the Year (2009); Big East Player of the Year (2007); 3× First-team All-Big East (2007–2009); Big East All-Freshman Team (2006)
- Stats at WNBA.com
- Stats at Basketball Reference
Medals
Women's basketball
Representing United States
Olympic Games
Gold medal – first place	2012 London	Team
Gold medal – first place	2016 Rio de Janeiro	Team
World Championship
Gold medal – first place	2010 Czech Republic
Gold medal – first place	2014 Turkey
Pan American Games
Gold medal – first place	2007 Brazil	Team

Angel Lajuane McCoughtry (born September 10, 1986) is an American former professional basketball player who last played for the Minnesota Lynx of the Women's National Basketball Association (WNBA) and a two-time Olympic gold medalist. McCoughtry completed her college career at the University of Louisville in 2009. She was selected first overall by the Atlanta Dream in the 2009 WNBA draft and was considered its franchise player during her tenure with the team. One of the WNBA's most electrifying players of the 2010s, McCoughtry also played overseas in Turkey, Slovakia, Lebanon, Hungary and Russia.

== Biography ==
McCoughtry was born in Baltimore on September 10, 1986, to Roi and Sharon McCoughtry. Her father had played the forward position at Coppin State University in west Baltimore. She first played basketball at the Northwood recreation center in northeast Baltimore and later became a standout in high school at the St. Frances Academy (Baltimore, Maryland) in east Baltimore. McCoughtry also attended The Patterson School in Lenoir, North Carolina before entering college at the University of Louisville.

McCoughtry led the Big East Conference in scoring, rebounding, and steals, while breaking school records for most steals in a season, most points in a season, and most points in a game. She was named Big East Player of the Year during her sophomore year in 2006–2007. In the summer of 2007, McCoughtry represented the United States on the Pan American Games women's basketball team. During her junior year at Louisville, McCoughtry broke her own records for points and steals on the season, and tied her own single-game scoring record. She played a key role in Louisville's upset of the Rutgers Scarlet Knights in the 2008 Big East tournament. In addition, McCoughtry was named an All-American as a junior, by organizations including the WBCA, USBWA, ESPN.com.

McCoughtry broke the record for career scoring by a Louisville women's basketball player during the first game of her senior year. She recorded her second triple-double (points, rebounds, steals) in a December 2008 game against the University of Hartford. She was selected 1st overall by the Atlanta Dream in the 2009 WNBA draft.

== Louisville statistics ==
Legend
GP	Games played	GS	Games started	MPG	Minutes per game
FG%	Field goal percentage	3P%	3-point field goal percentage	FT%	Free throw percentage
RPG	Rebounds per game	APG	Assists per game	SPG	Steals per game
BPG	Blocks per game	PPG	Points per game	**Bold**	Career high

Year	Team	GP	Points	FG%	3P%	FT%	RPG	APG	SPG	BPG	PPG
2005–06	Louisville	29	266	.467	.300	.554	7.4	1.6	2.0	0.8	9.2
2006–07	Louisville	35	754	**.508**	**.370**	.722	**10.3**	1.7	3.2	**1.6**	21.5
2007–08	Louisville	36	858	.467	.296	.728	8.9	1.5	4.1	1.1	**23.8**
2008–09	Louisville	**39**	**901**	.437	.307	**.743**	9.3	**1.9**	**4.2**	1.1	23.1
Career		139	2,779	.467	.319	.713	9.1	1.7	3.5	1.2	20.0

== WNBA career ==
Upon joining the Atlanta Dream, McCoughtry soon made a name for herself as an outstanding scorer with excellent penetration and a penchant for drawing the foul. In her debut season, McCoughtry won Rookie of the Year honors, averaging 12.8 ppg.

The following season, McCoughtry's stats significantly improved as she averaged 21.1 ppg, helping the Atlanta Dream to a 19–15 record and the fourth seed in the Eastern Conference. Despite the number four seed, The Dream were still a championship contender as their starting line-up had consisted of star center Érika de Souza, all-star power forward Sancho Lyttle, Izi Castro Marques as the starting shooting guard, along with McCoughtry at small forward, quickly developing into an all-star caliber player. The Dream advanced all the way to the WNBA Finals, facing the Seattle Storm. En route to the finals, McCoughtry set a WNBA playoff record with 42 points in game 2 of the Eastern Conference Finals against the New York Liberty. With the Dream down 2–0, McCoughtry had a historic performance in game 3 of the WNBA finals, scoring 35 points, but the Dream fell short losing to the Storm and being swept 3–0. McCoughtry averaged 26.7 ppg throughout the playoffs.

McCoughtry would have the best season of her career in the 2011 season, as she averaged a career-high 21.6 ppg, helping the Dream to a 20–14 record and the number three seed in the Eastern Conference. McCoughtry was also voted as a WNBA all-star for the first time in her career. The Dream would once again make it back to the WNBA Finals, this time against the Minnesota Lynx. Despite another historic Finals performance, the Dream were swept 3 games to 0. In Game 2 of the Finals, McCoughtry had set Finals records for most points in a quarter (19) and most points in a game (38).

During the 2012 season, McCoughtry was suspended by the Dream indefinitely for unspecified reasons. Despite the suspension, McCoughtry still won her first scoring title, averaging 21.4 ppg. McCoughtry also led the league with 2.5 steals per game. McCoughtry was also still able to play in the playoffs once her suspension expired, but the Dream were eliminated 2–1 in the first round by the Indiana Fever who won the championship that year.

In 2013, McCoughtry re-signed with the Dream to a multi-year deal once her rookie contract expired. In the 2013 season, McCoughtry would win her second scoring title, averaging 21.5 ppg and as well a career-high 2.7 steals per game. It was the fourth consecutive season where McCoughtry averaged 20+ ppg in a regular season. The Dream finished second in the Eastern Conference with a 17–17 record. The Dream would sweep the first and second rounds, making it back to the finals for a rematch against the Minnesota Lynx. The Lynx would once again sweep the Dream in the Finals, as McCoughtry had a less-than stellar performance this time, scoring under 20 points in each game throughout the series.

In the 2014 season, McCoughtry averaged 18.5 ppg ending her streak of consecutive 20+ ppg seasons, but was still voted as a WNBA all-star and also led the league in steals. With McCoughtry's contributions on both offence and defense, teammate Érika de Souza also being voted an all-star, Sancho Lyttle's prominent rebounding and the acquirement of rookie sensation Shoni Schimmel (who played with the team until 2015), the Dream finished first in the Eastern Conference for the first time in franchise history with a 19–15 record, being the only team in the Eastern Conference that season to finish above .500. However, the results weren't the same in the playoffs as they were upset 2–1 in the first round by the Chicago Sky.

In 2015, McCoughtry averaged 20.1 ppg and was voted as a WNBA all-star for the fourth time in her career, but the Dream never made it to the playoffs, making it McCoughtry's first season without playing in the playoffs. By this time, de Souza was traded to the Chicago Sky midway through the season.

In 2016, McCoughtry averaged 19.5 ppg during the season, helping the Dream to another playoff berth with a 17–17 record. With the WNBA's new playoff format in effect, the Dream were the number six seed in the league, facing the Seattle Storm in the first round. The Dream beat the Storm in the first round elimination game as McCoughtry scored 37 points in the win. In the second round elimination game, the Dream lost to the Chicago Sky.

In January 2017, it was announced that McCoughty would be resting during the 2017 WNBA season.

In February 2018, it was announced that McCoughtry re-signed with the Dream to a multi-year deal. On May 20, 2018, McCoughtry scored her 5,000th point in a 101–78 loss to the Dallas Wings, making her the 18th player in WNBA history to reach that milestone. On June 20, 2018, McCoughtry scored a career-high 39 points along with 14 rebounds in a 79–72 loss to the New York Liberty. During the season, McCoughtry would be voted into the 2018 WNBA All-Star Game, for her fifth all-star game appearance. Towards the end of the season, McCoughtry suffered a left knee injury that would keep her out for the rest of season. The Dream finished 23–11 with the number 2 seed in the league, receiving a double-bye to the semi-finals. Without McCoughry, the Dream were short-handed in the playoffs as they lost in five games to the Washington Mystics.

In 2019, McCoughtry would continue to be sidelined with a knee injury, causing her to miss the entire 2019 season.

In February 2020, McCoughtry left the Dream after 12 years of being with the franchise, signing with the Las Vegas Aces in free agency. McCoughtry would have a resurgence in the 2020 season and would immediately enter the starting lineup for the Aces. The 2020 season was delayed and shortened to 22 games in a bubble at IMG Academy due to the COVID-19 pandemic, McCoughtry made her return on July 26, 2020, scoring a season-high 25 points in an 88–86 loss to the Chicago Sky. Despite the season-opening loss, the Aces finished 18–4 with the number 1 seed, receiving a double bye to the semi-finals. On August 22, 2020, McCoughtry had tied her career-high in rebounds with a double-double performance of 11 points along with 14 rebounds in an 82–74 victory over the Seattle Storm. McCoughtry appeared to have returned to all-star form, playing in all 22 games while averaging career-highs in field goal shooting, three-point shooting and free throw shooting. McCoughtry's playing time would be increased in the playoffs and it would be her first playoff appearance since 2016. In the semi-finals, the Aces would defeat the Connecticut Sun in a hard-fought five-game series, advancing to the WNBA Finals, making it McCoughtry's fourth finals appearance, but with a shorthanded roster, the Aces would lose to a fully loaded Seattle Storm team in a three-game sweep.

In February 2022, McCoughtry signed with the Minnesota Lynx as an unrestricted free agent.

In May 2022, the Minnesota Lynx agreed to a buyout with the former All-Star. McCoughtry, 35, signed with Minnesota as a free agent in February. She played two games for the Lynx, averaging 6.0 points.

== United States National Team ==
McCoughtry was invited to the USA Basketball Women's National Team training camp in the fall of 2009. The team selected to play for the 2010 FIBA World Championship and the 2012 Olympics is usually chosen from these participants. At the conclusion of the training camp, the team travelled to Ekaterinburg, Russia, where they competed in the 2009 UMMC Ekaterinburg International Invitational.

McCoughtry earned most valuable player honors at the Ekaterinburg International Invitational Tournament, as she helped the USA Basketball team win the competition.

McCoughtry was one of twenty players named to the national team pool. Twelve of this group were chosen to represent the US in the 2010 World Championships and the 2012 Olympics.

McCoughtry was selected to be a member of the National team representing the US at the World Championships held in September and October 2010. The team was coached by Geno Auriemma. Because many team members were still playing in the WNBA until just prior to the event, the team had only one day of practice with the entire team before leaving for Ostrava and Karlovy Vary, Czech Republic. Even with limited practice, the team managed to win its first game against Greece by 26 points. The team continued to dominate with victory margins exceeding 20 points in the first five games. Several players shared scoring honors, with Swin Cash, McCoughtry, Maya Moore, Diana Taurasi, Lindsay Whalen, and Sylvia Fowles all ending as high scorer in the first few games. The sixth game was against undefeated Australia—the US team jumped out to a 24-point lead and ultimately prevailed 83–75. The USA won its next two games by over 30 points, and then faced the host team, the Czech Republic, in the championship game. The US team had only a five-point lead at halftime, which was then cut to three points, but the Czechs never got closer. Team USA went on to win the championship and gold medal. McCoughtry was the second leading scorer with 11.3 ppg. She also led the team in steals with a total of 24.

McCoughtry was named as one of the National team members to represent the USA Basketball team in the WNBA versus USA Basketball game. This game replaced the WNBA All-Star game with WNBA All-Stars versus USA Basketball, as part of the preparation for the FIBA World Championship for Women to be held in the Czech Republic during September and October 2010.

McCoughtry was one of 21 finalists for the U.S. Women's Olympic Basketball Team Roster. The 20 WNBA players, plus one collegiate player (Brittney Griner), were selected by the USA Basketball Women's National Team Player Selection Committee to compete for the final roster which represented the US at the 2012 Summer Olympics in London. She was selected and was part of the US team that won the gold medal.

McCoughtry played for Team USA during the 2016 Summer Olympics in Rio, helping the team win another gold medal as they beat Spain 101–72. McCoughtry became a two-time Olympic basketball champion.

== Overseas career ==
Since being drafted in the WNBA, McCoughtry has played every off-season overseas. In the 2009–10 off-season, McCoughtry played for Good Angels Košice in the EuroLeague. In the 2010–11 off-season played for UNIQA Sopron of the EuroLeague. From 2011 to 2015, McCoughtry played four off-seasons for Fenerbahçe Istanbul of the EuroLeague. In the 2015–16 off-season, McCoughtry played for Mersin Büyükşehir Belediyesi of the Turkish League. As of August 2016, McCoughtry signed with Dynamo Kursk of the Russian Premier League for the 2016–17 off-season. Dynamo Kursk won the 2017 Euroleague. In May 2017, McCoughtry signed with Homenetmen Antelias of the Lebanese league; which she won the championship with. Also in 2017, McCoughtry returned to Dynamo Kursk for the 2017-18 off-season. In January 2021, McCoughtry signed with Galatasaray of the Turkish league for the 2020-21 off-season.

== Personal life ==
McCoughtry grew up in Baltimore, Maryland and graduated from St. Frances Academy, then spent one year at The Patterson School in North Carolina while working to attain NCAA Division I academic eligibility. She is listed at 6'1" tall and wears jersey number 35. McCoughtry came out publicly as gay on Instagram in 2015. She is an honorary member of Zeta Phi Beta.

== Business ventures ==
In November 2016, McCoughtry announced that she's opening an ice cream store called "McCoughtry's Ice Cream" in Atlanta for January 2017. In August 2019, McCoughtry became the first WNBA athlete to host a basketball camp in Ghana.

== WNBA career statistics ==
Legend
GP	Games played	GS	Games started	MPG	Minutes per game	RPG	Rebounds per game
APG	Assists per game	SPG	Steals per game	BPG	Blocks per game	PPG	Points per game
TO	Turnovers per game	FG%	Field-goal percentage	3P%	3-point field-goal percentage	FT%	Free-throw percentage
**Bold**	Career best	°	League leader

=== Regular season ===
Year	Team	GP	GS	MPG	FG%	3P%	FT%	RPG	APG	SPG	BPG	TO	PPG
2009	Atlanta	**34**	10	21.6	.476	.294	.741	3.1	2.1	2.2	0.4	**2.1**	12.8
2010	Atlanta	**34**	**34**	30.7	.408	.262	.803	4.9	3.1	1.9	0.6	3.1	21.1
2011	Atlanta	33	30	27.9	.424	.264	.777	5.2	2.5	2.2	1.0	3.1	**21.6**
2012	Atlanta	24	17	29.9	.447	.337	.800	5.0	2.9	2.5°	**1.1**	3.9	21.4°
2013	Atlanta	33	32	**31.4**	.413	.204	.824	5.3	**4.4**	**2.7**	0.7	4.0	21.5°
2014	Atlanta	31	29	31.3	.420	.295	.809	5.2	3.6	2.3°	0.3	3.7	18.5
2015	Atlanta	**34**	26	30.0	.413	.363	.805	5.3	2.8	2.1	0.5	3.1	20.1
2016	Atlanta	33	32	30.0	.434	.302	.788	5.7	2.8	1.5	0.7	2.9	19.5
2018	Atlanta	29	28	27.5	.420	.276	.846	**6.0**	3.0	1.3	0.5	2.6	16.5
2020	Las Vegas	22	22	20.0	.**518**	.**471**	**.882**	5.1	2.5	1.3	0.3	1.7	14.4
2021	Las Vegas	1	0	0.0	.000	.000	.000	0.0	0.0	0.0	0.0	0.0	0.0
2022	Minnesota	2	2	10.0	.375	.000	1.000	3.0	1.0	0.5	1.0	1.5	6.0
Career	13 years, 3 teams	311	263	28.0	.429	.293	.802	5.0	2.9	2.0	0.6	3.1	18.6

=== Postseason ===
Year	Team	GP	GS	MPG	FG%	3P%	FT%	RPG	APG	SPG	BPG	TO	PPG
2009	Atlanta	2	2	29.0	.484	.571	.667	5.5	3.0	1.0	0.0	6.0	19.0
2010	Atlanta	7	7	30.9	.462	.455	.797	5.4	2.3	2.0	0.6	3.1	26.7
2011	Atlanta	**8**	**8**	29.1	.423	.300	.747	5.5	1.5	**3.0**°	0.8	2.7	23.1°
2012	Atlanta	3	3	33.3	.412	.250	.818	5.7	3.3	2.3	**1.3**	2.0	18.0
2013	Atlanta	**8**	**8**	30.8	.314	.250	.830	3.4	3.6	2.1	1.0	3.5	17.9
2014	Atlanta	3	3	**35.2**	.433	.444	**.923**	**6.0**	3.3	2.6	0.3	**1.3**	26.7°
2016	Atlanta	2	2	34.8	**.548**	**.700**	.733	4.5	**8.0**	0.5	0.0	3.5	**32.0**°
2020	Las Vegas	**8**	**8**	25.1	.413	.550	.852	5.0	2.8	1.6	0.3	1.9	15.5
Career	8 years, 2 teams	41	41	30.0	.415	.402	.800	5.0	3.0	2.1	0.6	2.8	21.3

== See also ==
- List of NCAA Division I women's basketball players with 2,500 points and 1,000 rebounds
- List of NCAA Division I women's basketball career steals leaders
