= WNBA All-Star Game =

Annual exhibition basketball game

- Frequency: Annual
- Inaugurated: 1999
- Most recent: 2026 (Chicago)
- Previous event: 2025 (Indianapolis)
- Next event: 2027 (San Francisco Bay Area)
- Participants: Eastern Conference and Western Conference All-Stars
- Organizer: Women's National Basketball Association

Logo for the inaugural WNBA All-Star Game, held in 1999

The Women's National Basketball Association All-Star Game, commonly referred to as the WNBA All-Star Game, is the annual all-star game hosted each July by the Women's National Basketball Association, showcasing the league's top players. It is the feature event of the WNBA All-Star Weekend, a three-day event which goes from Friday to Sunday in a selected WNBA city. The WNBA All-Star Game was first played at Madison Square Garden on July 14, 1999.

== Structure ==
From 1999 to 2017, the WNBA All-Star Game featured star players from the Western Conference competing against star players from the Eastern Conference. Starters were selected by fan voting through internet ballots, while the remaining players were chosen by league personnel, including head coaches and media members. At the end of the game, the All-Star Game Most Valuable Player (MVP) was named by a panel of media representatives.

Then starting in 2018, the WNBA formally introduced a new format for the All-Star Game, eliminating the traditional Eastern Conference vs. Western Conference structure in favor of a player draft. In this new format, two captains – determined by the highest number of fan votes – draft their teams from a pool of players voted as All-Stars, regardless of conference affiliation. Voting for All-Star starters includes inputs from fans, WNBA players, and sports media members, with a weighted system (fans 50%, players and media 25% each). Reserves are selected by the league's head coaches.

The All-Star Weekend also features a Three-Point Contest and, until 2025, a Skills Challenge. The Three-Point Contest consists of multiple round in which players compete to make the most three-point shots from various spots around the arc within a set time limit. The Skills Challenge is an obstacle course designed to test players' abilities in key aspects of the game, such as dribbling, passing, and shooting. The player who completes the course in the fastest time in the final round is declared the winner. Both competitions usually feature five players, selected based on their performance during the regular season.

In 2026, in recognition of the league’s 30th anniversary, the Skills Challenge was replaced with a “Shooting Stars” timed shooting contest showcasing teamwork between teams consisting of a high school player from Nike EYBL, a current WNBA player, and a retired “legend” WNBA player. The Shooting Stars contest is slated for 2027, as well.

== History ==
The inaugural WNBA All Star Game was played in 1999 at Madison Square Garden in New York City, in front of a sold-out crowd. Whitney Houston performed the national anthem. The West Conference defeated the Eastern Conference 79–61 and Lisa Leslie was named the first-ever All-Star Game Most Valuable Player (MVP) after recording 13 points and five rebounds for the West.

In 2004, The Game at Radio City was held in place of a traditional All-Star Game due to the WNBA players competing in the 2004 Summer Olympics in Athens, Greece. That year, the USA national team defeated a team of WNBA All-Stars 74–58. The game is officially considered to be an exhibition rather than an All-Star Game. The league also took a month-long break to accommodate players and coaches competing in the Olympic Games.

From 2008 through 2016, no All-Star Game was held during Summer Olympic years, continuing the tradition of taking a month-long mid-season break. In 2010, an exhibition game, Stars at the Sun, was played at Mohegan Sun Arena, where Team USA defeated a WNBA All-Star team 99–72.

Although the 2020 Summer Olympics were postponed to 2021 due to the COVID-19 pandemic, no All-Star Game was played in that season. The 2021 season featured the first All-Star Game in an Olympic year since 2000, with a WNBA All-Star team facing the USA national team. The 2024 game followed the same format and was also considered an official All-Star Game.

== All-Star Game results ==
Eastern Conference (4 wins)	Western Conference (10 wins)

Year	Result	Host arena	Host city	Game MVP
1999	West 79, East 61	Madison Square Garden	New York, New York	Lisa Leslie, Los Angeles Sparks
2000	West 73, East 61	America West Arena	Phoenix, Arizona	Tina Thompson, Houston Comets
2001	West 80, East 72	TD Waterhouse Centre	Orlando, Florida	Lisa Leslie (2), Los Angeles Sparks (2)
2002	West 81, East 76	MCI Center	Washington, D.C.	Lisa Leslie (3), Los Angeles Sparks (3)
2003	West 84, East 75	Madison Square Garden (2)	New York, New York (2)	Nikki Teasley, Los Angeles Sparks (4)
2004	The Game at Radio City			
2005	West 122, East 99	Mohegan Sun Arena	Uncasville, Connecticut	Sheryl Swoopes, Houston Comets (2)
2006	East 98, West 82	Madison Square Garden (3)	New York, New York (3)	Katie Douglas, Connecticut Sun
2007	East 103, West 99	Verizon Center	Washington, D.C. (2)	Cheryl Ford, Detroit Shock
2008	No game due to the 2008 Summer Olympics			
2009	West 130, East 118	Mohegan Sun Arena (2)	Uncasville, Connecticut (2)	Swin Cash, Seattle Storm
2010	Stars at the Sun			
2011	East 118, West 113	AT&T Center	San Antonio, Texas	Swin Cash (2), Seattle Storm (2)
2012	No game due to the 2012 Summer Olympics			
2013	West 102, East 98	Mohegan Sun Arena (3)	Uncasville, Connecticut (3)	Candace Parker, Los Angeles Sparks (5)
2014	East 125, West 124 (OT)	US Airways Center (2)	Phoenix, Arizona (2)	Shoni Schimmel, Atlanta Dream
2015	West 117, East 112	Mohegan Sun Arena (4)	Uncasville, Connecticut (4)	Maya Moore, Minnesota Lynx
2016	No game due to the 2016 Summer Olympics			
2017	West 130, East 121	KeyArena	Seattle, Washington	Maya Moore (2), Minnesota Lynx (2)
2018	Team Parker 119, Team Delle Donne 112	Target Center	Minneapolis, Minnesota	Maya Moore (3), Minnesota Lynx (3)
2019	Team Wilson 129, Team Delle Donne 126	Mandalay Bay Events Center	Las Vegas, Nevada	Erica Wheeler, Indiana Fever
2020	No game due to the 2020 Summer Olympics, which was later postponed by the COVID-19 pandemic			
2021	Team WNBA 93, Team USA 85	Michelob Ultra Arena (2)	Las Vegas, Nevada (2)	Arike Ogunbowale, Dallas Wings (2)
2022	Team Wilson 134, Team Stewart 112	Wintrust Arena	Chicago, Illinois	Kelsey Plum, Las Vegas Aces
2023	Team Stewart 143, Team Wilson 127	Michelob Ultra Arena (3)	Las Vegas, Nevada (3)	Jewell Loyd, Seattle Storm (3)
2024	Team WNBA 117, Team USA 109	Footprint Center (3)	Phoenix, Arizona (3)	Arike Ogunbowale (2), Dallas Wings (3)
2025	Team Collier 151, Team Clark 131	Gainbridge Fieldhouse	Indianapolis, Indiana	Napheesa Collier, Minnesota Lynx (4)
2026	Team Spoon 129, Team Coop 122	United Center	Chicago, Illinois (2)	Jonquel Jones, New York Liberty
2027	TBD	Chase Center	San Francisco Bay Area, CA	TBD

- Five WNBA cities haven't been selected to host the All-Star Game: Atlanta; Dallas; Los Angeles; Portland, OR & Toronto, ON.

== Three-Point Contest ==
The Three-Point Contest, formerly referred to as the Three-Point Shootout, was held during the All-Star Game event from 2006 to 2010, and then once again from 2017 to the present.

^	Denotes players who are still active
*	Elected to the Basketball Hall of Fame
Player (#)	Denotes the number of times the player has won
Team (#)	Denotes the number of times a player from this team has won
Location (#)	Denotes the number of times a location has hosted the competition

Year	Winner	Team	Final score / max	% shots made	Other contestants
2006	Dawn Staley*	Houston Comets	17 / 30	56.6%	Katie Douglas, Katie Smith, Diana Taurasi
2007	Laurie Koehn	Washington Mystics	25 / 30	83.3%	Diana Taurasi, Penny Taylor, Katie Douglas, Deanna Nolan
2009	Becky Hammon*	San Antonio Silver Stars	16 / 30	53.3%	Sue Bird, Katie Smith, Shameka Christon, Katie Douglas, Diana Taurasi
2010	Katie Douglas	Indiana Fever	23 / 30	76.6%	Lindsay Whalen, Swin Cash, Sue Bird, Monique Currie, Angel McCoughtry
2017	Allie Quigley	Chicago Sky	27 / 34	79.4%	Sugar Rodgers, Maya Moore, Jasmine Thomas, Sue Bird
2018	Allie Quigley (2)	Chicago Sky (2)	29 / 34	85.3%	Kayla McBride, Kristi Toliver, Jewell Loyd, Renee Montgomery, Kelsey Mitchell
2019	Shekinna Stricklen	Connecticut Sun	23 / 34	67.6%	Kayla McBride, Allie Quigley, Kia Nurse, Erica Wheeler, Chelsea Gray
2021	Allie Quigley (3)	Chicago Sky (3)	28 / 40	70.0%	Jonquel Jones, Sami Whitcomb, Jewell Loyd
2022	Allie Quigley (4)	Chicago Sky (4)	30 / 40	75.0%	Ariel Atkins, Rhyne Howard, Arike Ogunbowale, Jewell Loyd, Kelsey Plum
2023	Sabrina Ionescu^	New York Liberty	37 / 40^{1}	92.5%	DiJonai Carrington, Kelsey Mitchell, Arike Ogunbowale, Sami Whitcomb, Jackie Young
2024	Allisha Gray^	Atlanta Dream	22 / 40	55.0%	Jonquel Jones, Kayla McBride, Stefanie Dolson, Marina Mabrey
2025	Sabrina Ionescu^ (2)	New York Liberty	30 / 40	75.0%	Allisha Gray, Sonia Citron, Kelsey Plum, Lexie Hull
2026	Azzi Fudd^	Dallas Wings	30 / 40	75.0%	Bridget Carleton, Janelle Salaün, Marina Mabrey, Natisha Hiedeman, Rhyne Howard

=== Multi-time winners ===
Wins	Player	Team(s)	Years
4	Allie Quigley	Chicago Sky	2017, 2018, 2021, 2022
2	Sabrina Ionescu	New York Liberty	2023, 2025

^{1} All-time record score for a WNBA or NBA Three-Point Contest, surpassing the NBA record of 31 points set by Stephen Curry in Atlanta (2021), which Tyrese Haliburton equaled in Salt Lake City (2023). However, Ionescu used a smaller WNBA regulation ball to set the record. Ionescu also competed with Curry in a head-to-head shootout at the 2024 NBA All-Star Weekend in Indianapolis, with both players shooting from the NBA 3-point line but using WNBA and NBA balls, respectively.

Three Point Contest champions by franchise

No.	Franchise	Last win
4	Chicago Sky	2022
2	New York Liberty	2025
1	Atlanta Dream	2024
1	Connecticut Sun	2019
1	Indiana Fever	2010
1	San Antonio Silver Stars	2009
1	Washington Mystics	2007
1	Houston Comets	2006

== Skills Challenge ==
The WNBA introduced the Dribble, Dish & Swish Challenge starting during the 2003 WNBA All-Star Game. It became renamed to the Skills Challenge was held during the All-Star Game event during 2006–2007, 2010, 2019, and 2022-2024. The most recent Skills Challenge rules were "a classic obstacle course format that will challenge players' abilities in each key facet of the game: dribbling, passing and shooting. In the first round, each player will maneuver around the course as fast as possible, and the players with the two fastest times will advance to the final round. There, they'll repeat the course, and the player with the fastest time in the final round will receive the trophy."

^	Denotes players who are still active
*	Elected to the Basketball Hall of Fame
Player (#)	Denotes the number of times the player has won
Team (#)	Denotes the number of times a player from this team has won
Location (#)	Denotes the number of times a location has hosted the competition

Year	Winner	Team	Final Time/Competitor	Other contestants
2003	Dawn Staley*	Charlotte Sting		
2005	Sue Bird*	Seattle Storm	Becky Hammon	Tamika Catchings, Diana Taurasi, Deanna Nolan, Taj McWilliams-Franklin, DeMya Walker, Marie Ferdinand
2006	Seimone Augustus*	Minnesota Lynx	28.5	Sue Bird, Cappie Pondexter, Deanna Nolan
2007	Becky Hammon*	San Antonio Silver Stars	27.1	Seimone Augustus, Betty Lennox, Nikki Teasley
2009	Cappie Pondexter	Phoenix Mercury	34.8	Jia Perkins, Tamika Catchings, Sancho Lyttle, Swin Cash, Nicole Powell, Nicky Anosike, Alana Beard, Asjha Jones, Sylvia Fowles
2009	Sophia Young	San Antonio Silver Stars (2)	34.8	Jia Perkins, Tamika Catchings, Sancho Lyttle, Swin Cash, Nicole Powell, Nicky Anosike, Alana Beard, Asjha Jones, Sylvia Fowles
2009	Charde Houston	Minnesota Lynx (2)	34.8	Jia Perkins, Tamika Catchings, Sancho Lyttle, Swin Cash, Nicole Powell, Nicky Anosike, Alana Beard, Asjha Jones, Sylvia Fowles
2010	Renee Montgomery	Connecticut Sun	25.0	Cappie Pondexter, Lindsay Whalen, Iziane Castro Marques, Lindsey Harding, Angel McCoughtry
2019	Diamond DeShields ^	Chicago Sky	Jonquel Jones	Courtney Vandersloot, Sami Whitcomb, Napheesa Collier, Odyssey Sims, Elizabeth Williams, Brittney Griner
2022	Sabrina Ionescu^	New York Liberty	NaLyssa Smith	Courtney Vandersloot, Jonquel Jones, Jackie Young, Kelsey Plum, Azurá Stevens, Rhyne Howard
2023	Kelsey Plum^	Las Vegas Aces	Courtney Vandersloot; Sabrina Ionescu	Allisha Gray, Cheyenne Parker, Arike Ogunbowale, Satou Sabally
2023	Chelsea Gray^	Las Vegas Aces	Courtney Vandersloot; Sabrina Ionescu	Allisha Gray, Cheyenne Parker, Arike Ogunbowale, Satou Sabally
2024	Allisha Gray^	Atlanta Dream	Sophie Cunningham	Brittney Griner, Kelsey Mitchell, Marina Mabrey
2025	Natasha Cloud^	New York Liberty (2)	Erica Wheeler	Allisha Gray, Skylar Diggins, Courtney Williams

== Shooting Stars Contest ==
The WNBA introduced the Shooting Stars contest during the 2026 WNBA All-Star Game, in recognition of the league’s 30th anniversary. The event showcases 3-player teams each containing a standout high school player from the Nike Elite Youth Basketball League (EYBL), a current WNBA player, and a retired WNBA legend.

During the event, teams shoot from various locations on the court, each worth a different number of points ranging between 1 and 7, based on difficulty. Teams start at spot 1, with each player shooting once at the station, then proceed through stations 2 through 6, with players remaining in the same order and shooting once at each station. At the final station, players may shoot repeatedly until time expires, as long as players stay in order. Teams aim to score the most points within 70 seconds, and the top two teams after the first round compete in a second championship round.

Year	Winning Team	Runner Up Team	Other Teams (no particular order)	
2026	Team Washington (31): Elena Delle Donne, Shakira Austin, GG Banks	Team Seattle (24): Lauren Jackson, Flau’jae Johnson, Tatianna Griffin	Team Minnesota: Rebekkah Brunson, Courtney Williams, Ryan Carter	Team Dallas/Detroit: Deanna Nolan, Jessica Shepard, Morghan Reckley

== See also ==
- List of WNBA All-Stars
- Women's National Basketball Association
- NBA All-Star Game
