= 2005 WNBA All-Star Game =

Exhibition basketball game

	1	2	Total
West	52	70	122
East	43	56	99
- Date: July 9, 2005
- Arena: Mohegan Sun Arena
- City: Uncasville, Connecticut
- MVP: Sheryl Swoopes
- Attendance: 9,168

WNBA All-Star Game
< 2004	2006 >

The 2005 WNBA All-Star Game was played on July 9, 2005 at Mohegan Sun Arena in Uncasville, Connecticut, home of the Connecticut Sun. The game was the 6th annual WNBA All-Star Game. This was the first time Connecticut hosted the basketball showcase. The West defeated the East, 122–99, and Sheryl Swoopes was named the All-Star Game MVP after scoring 15 points in 25 minutes.

== The All-Star Game ==
=== Rosters ===
Western Conference All-Stars
Pos.	Player	Team	Selection #
Starters
PG	(United States) Sue Bird	Seattle Storm	3rd
SG	(United States) Diana Taurasi	Phoenix Mercury	1st
SF	(United States) Sheryl Swoopes	Houston Comets	5th
PF	(Australia) Lauren Jackson	Seattle Storm	4th
C	(United States) Yolanda Griffith	Sacramento Monarchs	5th
Reserves
SG	(United States) Marie Ferdinand	San Antonio Silver Stars	3rd
SG	(United States) Katie Smith	Minnesota Lynx	5th
SF	(United States) Chamique Holdsclaw	Los Angeles Sparks	6th
PF	(United States) DeMya Walker	Sacramento Monarchs	1st
C	(United States) Lisa Leslie	Los Angeles Sparks	6th
C	(United States) Michelle Snow	Houston Comets	1st

Eastern Conference All Stars
Pos.	Player	Team	Selection #
Starters
PG	(United States) Dawn Staley	Charlotte Sting	4th
SG	(United States) Becky Hammon	New York Liberty	2nd
SF	(United States) Tamika Catchings	Indiana Fever	3rd
PF	(United States) Swin Cash	Detroit Shock	2nd
C	(United States) Ruth Riley	Detroit Shock	1st
Reserves
SG	(United States) Alana Beard	Washington Mystics	1st
SG	(United States) Deanna Nolan	Detroit Shock	2nd
SG	(United States) Nykesha Sales	Connecticut Sun	6th
PF	(United States) Cheryl Ford	Detroit Shock	2nd
PF	(United States) Taj McWilliams-Franklin	Connecticut Sun	4th
C	(Belgium) Ann Wauters	New York Liberty	1st

ABC

July 9
4:00 p.m.

Western Conference 122, Eastern Conference 99
Pts: Katie Smith 16; Rebs: Yolanda Griffith 14; Asts: Diana Taurasi 4	Pts: Deanna Nolan 20; Rebs: Catchings, Hammon 6 Asts: Hammon, Staley 4

Mohegan Sun Arena, Uncasville, Connecticut
Attendance: 9,168

=== Coaches ===
The coach for the Western Conference was Seattle Storm coach Anne Donovan. The coach for the Eastern Conference was Connecticut Sun coach Mike Thibault.
