= Swin Cash =

American basketball player (born 1979)

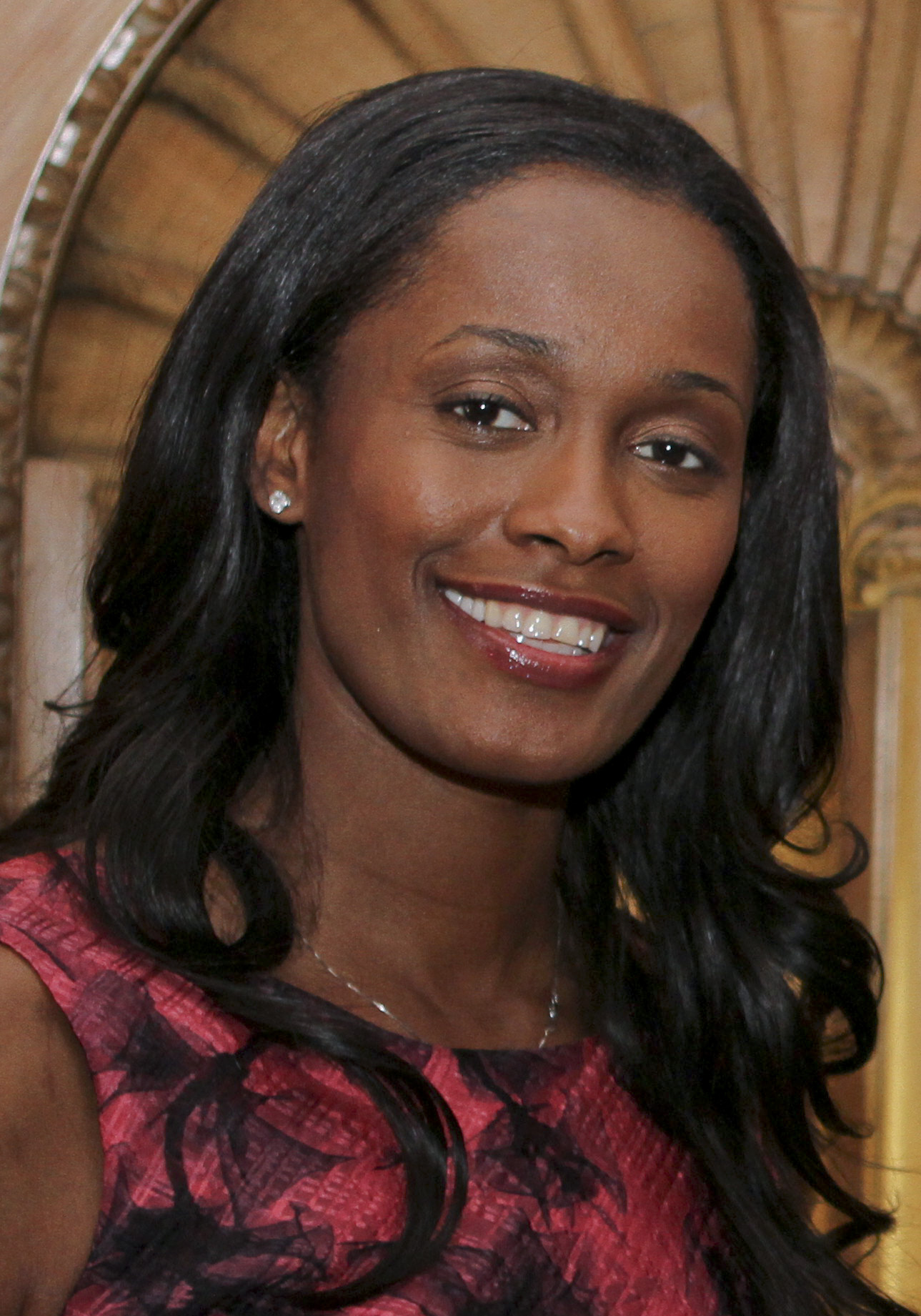
- Cash in 2012

Personal information
- Born: September 22, 1979 (age 47) McKeesport, Pennsylvania, U.S.
- Listed height: 6 ft 1 in (1.85 m)
- Listed weight: 162 lb (73 kg)

Career information
- High school: McKeesport (McKeesport, Pennsylvania)
- College: UConn (1998–2002)
- WNBA draft: 2002: 1st round, 2nd overall pick
- Drafted by: Detroit Shock
- Playing career: 2002–2016
- Position: Small forward
- Number: 32, 2, 8, 4

Career history
- 2002–2007: Detroit Shock
- 2003–2004: VBM-SGAU Samara
- 2008–2011: Seattle Storm
- 2008–2009: ZVVZ USK Prague
- 2012–2013: Chicago Sky
- 2014: Atlanta Dream
- 2014–2016: New York Liberty

Career highlights
- 3× WNBA champion (2003, 2006, 2010); 4× WNBA All-Star (2003, 2005, 2009, 2011); 2× WNBA All-Star Game MVP (2009, 2011); 2× All-WNBA Second Team (2003, 2004); WNBA anniversary teams (20th, 25th); 4× NBA Shooting Stars champion (2007, 2013–2015); 2× NCAA champion (2000, 2002); NCAA Tournament MOP (2002); All-American – Kodak, USBWA (2002); Second-team All-American – AP (2002); First-team All-Big East (2002); No. 32 retired by UConn Huskies

Career WNBA statistics
- Points: 5,119 (10.7 ppg)
- Rebounds: 2,521 (5.3 rpg)
- Assists: 1,133 (2.4 apg)
- Stats at WNBA.com
- Stats at Basketball Reference
- Basketball Hall of Fame
- Women's Basketball Hall of Fame
Medals
Women's basketball
Representing the United States
Olympic Games
Gold medal – first place	2004 Athens	Team competition
Gold medal – first place	2012 London	Team competition
FIBA World Championship for Women
Gold medal – first place	2010 Czech Republic	Team competition

Swintayla Marie Cash Canal (born September 22, 1979) is an American former professional basketball player. She played in college for the University of Connecticut and professionally for 15 years in the Women's National Basketball Association (WNBA) and overseas leagues.

A prolific scorer and rebounder, as well as a capable ball handler and defender, she helped lead the UConn Huskies to national titles in 2000 and 2002. She was drafted second overall in the 2002 WNBA draft by the Detroit Shock, and helped lead the team to championships in 2003 and 2006. She won a third championship with the Seattle Storm in 2010, and also played for the Chicago Sky and New York Liberty before retiring in 2016. She was named a WNBA All-Star four times and won the All-Star Game MVP award twice.

In 2015, she was named a studio analyst for MSG Networks covering the New York Knicks pre-game, post-game, and weekly coaches shows. In 2017, she was named the director of franchise development for the New York Liberty. She was inducted into the Naismith Memorial Basketball Hall of Fame on September 9, 2022.

Cash is one of 11 women to receive an Olympic gold medal, an NCAA Championship, a FIBA World Cup, and a WNBA Championship.

== Personal life ==
Cash was born in the Pittsburgh suburb of McKeesport and raised by her mother, Cynthia. She has two brothers named Stephen and Kevin Menifee and one sister, Angelique Menifee. She holds basketball camps and clinics under her company, Swin Cash Enterprise LLC, and is involved in charity events through the WNBA. Cash married longtime boyfriend Steve Canal in Atlanta, Georgia. On July 9, 2025, Cash became an honorary member of Delta Sigma Theta sorority.

== High school ==
Cash attended McKeesport Area High School in McKeesport, where she participated in many activities. She tried baseball, track and cheerleading. She was also in school plays. Cash is best known for her basketball skills, which earned her a place on the national WBCA All-American team. She participated in the WBCA High School All-America Game where she scored fourteen points, and earned MVP honors.

== College ==
Cash was an All-American at the University of Connecticut (UConn). She won the NCAA Women's Division I Basketball Championship with the UConn Huskies in 2000 and 2002. She also helped lead UConn to an undefeated 39–0 season in 2002. Swin was a member of the inaugural class (2006) of inductees to the University of Connecticut women's basketball "Huskies of Honor" recognition program.

== Professional career ==
Cash was selected by the Detroit Shock in the 2002 WNBA draft, second overall. After leading the Shock's resurgence in the second half of her rookie season, she then led the Detroit Shock to their first WNBA Championship title in 2003. She played in the 2003 WNBA All-Star Game and won the gold medal with the U.S. women's basketball team at the 2004 Olympic Games.

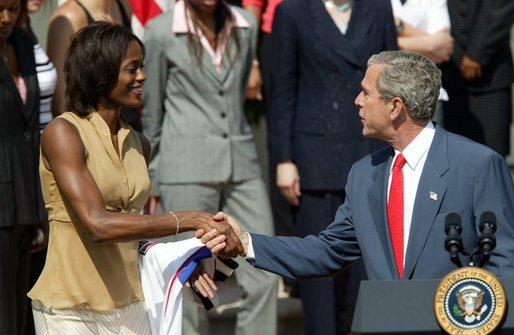
Swin Cash meets George W. Bush after winning the WNBA Championship with the Detroit Shock in May 2004

In the off-season, Cash has appeared as a studio analyst on ESPN's NBA Fastbreak (according to ESPN.com) and during the 2008 Beijing Olympic games, she alternated with Teresa Edwards in presenting in-game commentary for NBC's presentation of the women's basketball tournament from the network's New York broadcast studios. Swin appeared (as herself) in the movie Bring It On: All or Nothing.

Cash received the Dapper Dan Sportswoman of the Year award given to one who shows excellence in the Pittsburgh area. She was also honored with Sidney Crosby and Dan Rooney.

Cash left Detroit for the 2008 season after "struggling to build a consistent relationship with Detroit Shock head coach Bill Laimbeer". On February 19, 2008 Cash was traded to the Seattle Storm for the 4th pick in the 2008 WNBA draft. The Shock selected Alexis Hornbuckle with their draft pick. Cash along with Sue Bird and Lauren Jackson helped the Storm win their second championship in 2010. On January 2, 2012, in perhaps the WNBA's biggest blockbuster trade news thus far, Cash was traded, along with Le'Coe Willingham, to the Chicago Sky joining All- Star Sylvia Fowles.

Cash has been suffering from a herniated disk for more than two years, an injury suffered while helping the Detroit Shock win the WNBA championship in 2006. In 2009, she came back to Connecticut to lead the Western Conference over the Eastern Conference at Mohegan Sun in Uncasville, Connecticut. She led all scorers with an All-Star record of 22 points in a 130–118 win. The previous high was 20 by Cash's former Detroit teammate, Deanna Nolan, in 2005.

Cash was invited to the USA Basketball Women's National Team training camp in the fall of 2009. The team selected to play for the 2010 FIBA World Championship and the 2012 Olympics is usually chosen from these participants. At the conclusion of the training camp, the team will travel to Ekaterinburg, Russia, where they compete in the 2009 UMMC Ekaterinburg International Invitational.

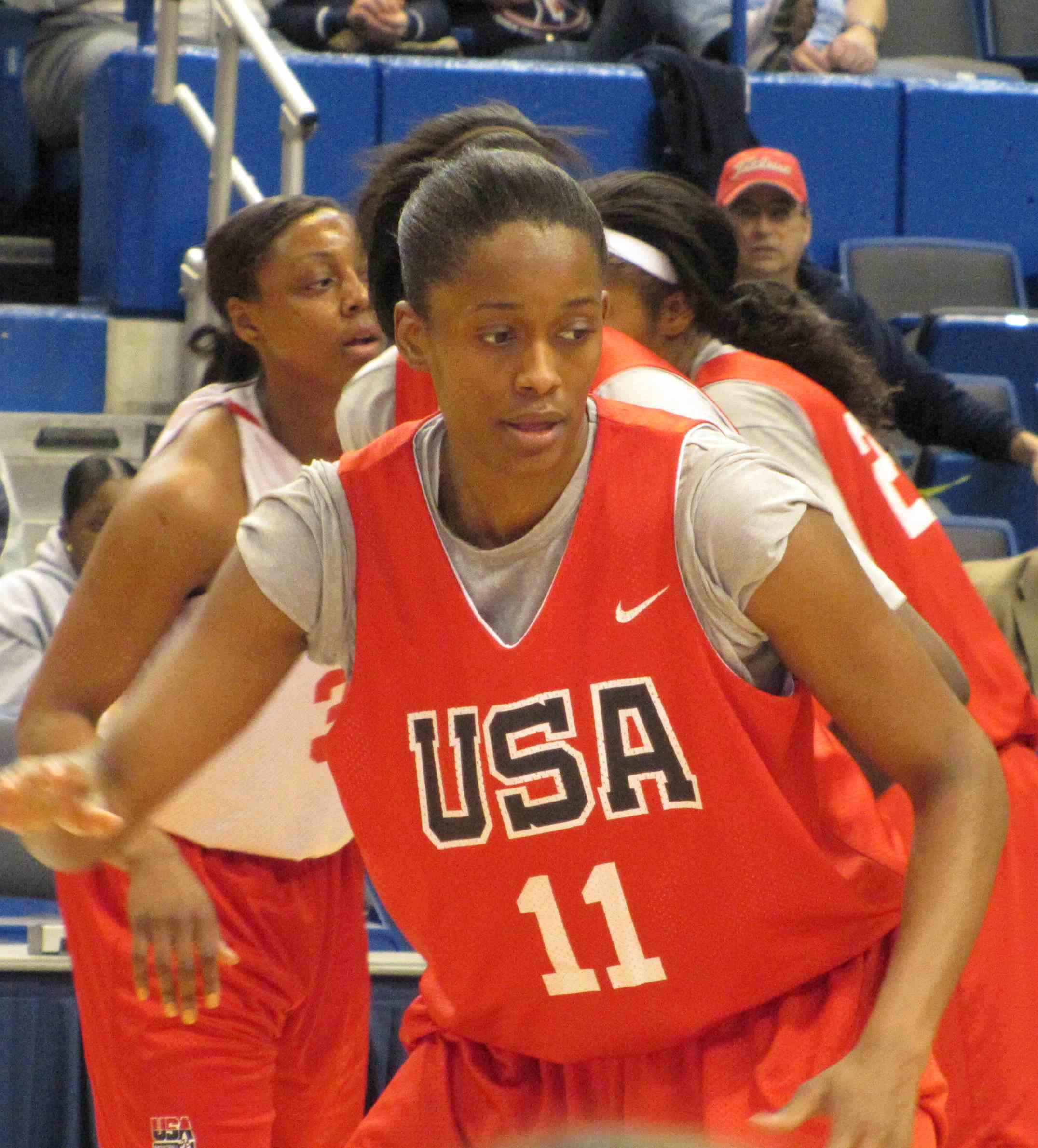
Cash at USA National team versus USA Select team scrimmage.

Cash was one of twenty players named to the national team pool. Twelve of this group will be chosen to represent the US in the 2010 World Championships and the 2012 Olympics.

Cash was selected to be a member of the National team representing the US at the World Championships held in September and October 2010. The team was coached by Geno Auriemma. Because many team members were still playing in the WNBA until just prior to the event, the team had only one day of practice with the entire team before leaving for Ostrava and Karlovy Vary, Czech Republic. Even with limited practice, the team managed to win its first games against Greece by 26 points. The team continued to dominate with victory margins exceeding 20 points in the first five games. Several players shared scoring honors, with Cash, Angel McCoughtry, Maya Moore, Diana Taurasi, Lindsay Whalen, and Sylvia Fowles all ending as high scorer in the first few games. The sixth game was against undefeated Australia — the USA jumped out to a 24-point lead and the USA prevailed 83–75. The USA won its next two games by over 30 points, then faced the host team, the Czech Republic, in the championship game. The USA team had only a five-point lead at halftime, which was cut to three points, but the Czechs never got closer. Team USA went on to win the championship and gold medal. Cash averaged 8.6 points per game.

Cash was named as one of the National team members to represent the USA Basketball team in the WNBA versus USA Basketball. This game replaces the normal WNBA All-Star game with WNBA All-Stars versus USA Basketball, as part of the preparation for the FIBA World Championship for Women to be held in the Czech Republic during September and October 2010.

Cash was one of 21 finalists for the U.S. Women's Olympic Basketball Team Roster. The 20 professional women's basketball players, plus one collegiate player (Brittney Griner), were selected by the USA Basketball Women's National Team Player Selection Committee to compete for the final roster which will represent the US at the 2012 Olympics in London. Cash made the final roster and played for the U.S. team that won the 2012 Olympic gold medal.

Washington and Jefferson College awarded Cash with an honorary degree in Doctorate of Public Service at their commencement ceremonies in May 2011 to honor her charity work. Cash is the founder of the Pennsylvania-based Cash for Kids charitable organization.

Cash was waived by New York Liberty on May 11, 2016. On May 24, 2016, it was reported that Cash re-signed with the Liberty for the remainder of the season. She was immediately eligible for their game versus the Atlanta Dream on that day.

On June 7, 2016, Cash announced that she would retire at the end of the 2016 season.

== Executive career ==
On June 10, 2019, Cash was hired to serve as the vice president of basketball operations and team development for the New Orleans Pelicans of the National Basketball Association. On September 26, 2024, she was promoted to the role of senior vice president of basketball operations. On April 24, 2025, Cash was dismissed by the Pelicans after six seasons with the team.

On September 23, 2025, Amazon Prime Video hired Cash to serve as a front office insider and WNBA analyst. In December 2026 Cash will be inducted into the Michigan Sports Hall of Fame.

== Anti-racism and anti-violence activism ==
Cash is an advocate against gun violence and police brutality. In 2016, she was fined $500 by the Association, along with her teammates and players from two other WNBA teams, for wearing warm up shirts that read "#BlackLivesMatter" and "#Dallas5", both serving as references to gun violence. In a post-game debriefing following the incident, Cash stated:

I think it’s a shame that we keep seeing people that want to make this movement as something that’s violent. Five cops gave their lives up trying to protect a peaceful movement. And in this country, I do believe that you can assemble peacefully and protest against injustice. So until the system transforms, we cannot sit here and act like there is not a problem here in America.

She said that part of what motivated her to take a stance against police violence was the Civil Rights Movement era stories her grandmother told her. She recognizes that police brutality is an aspect of racial activism, and she fears that because police are able to kill unarmed people without facing arrests, a regression to pre-Civil Rights laws and practices may occur for black people. In addition, her brother, Kevin Menifee, was allegedly beaten by police officers, who broke his nose.

== College statistics ==
Swin Cash statistics at University of Connecticut
Year	G	FG	FGA	PCT	3FG	3FGA	PCT	FT	FTA	PCT	REB	AVG	A	TO	B	S	MIN	PTS	AVG
1998–99	22	75	127	0.591	0	0	0.000	59	92	0.634	115	5.2	14	31	15	20	332	209	9.5
1999–2000	37	141	265	0.532	0	0	0.000	85	132	0.644	196	5.3	24	81	26	40	768	367	9.9
2000–01	35	162	292	0.555	0	0	0.000	103	174	0.592	263	7.5	51	76	34	33	832	427	12.2
2001–02	39	220	401	0.549	0	1	0.000	140	200	0.700	336	8.6	86	88	55	55	1085	580	14.9
Totals	133	598	1085	0.551	0	1	0	387	598	0.647	910	6.8	175	276	130	148	3017	1583	11.9

== WNBA career statistics ==
Legend
GP	Games played	GS	Games started	MPG	Minutes per game	RPG	Rebounds per game
APG	Assists per game	SPG	Steals per game	BPG	Blocks per game	PPG	Points per game
TO	Turnovers per game	FG%	Field-goal percentage	3P%	3-point field-goal percentage	FT%	Free-throw percentage
**Bold**	Career best	°	League leader

†	Denotes seasons in which Cash won a WNBA championship

=== Regular season ===
Year	Team	GP	GS	MPG	FG%	3P%	FT%	RPG	APG	SPG	BPG	TO	PPG
2002	Detroit	32	32	33.7	.408	.206	.762	**6.9**	2.7	1.1	0.9	3.1	14.8
2003^{†}	Detroit	33	33	33.2	.453	.300	.682	5.8	3.6	**1.3**	0.7	3.2	**16.6**
2004	Detroit	32	32	**34.5**	**.469**	.348	.721	6.5	**4.2**	**1.3**	0.9	2.5	16.4
2005	Detroit	21	21	21.8	.381	.200	.656	4.2	2.0	0.5	0.2	2.2	5.7
2006^{†}	Detroit	**34**	**34**	29.1	.384	.077	.762	4.9	3.1	0.5	0.3	2.5	10.5
2007	Detroit	31	31	30.9	.410	.000	.760	6.1	2.5	0.6	0.4	2.6	11.1
2008	Seattle	31	28	29.9	.389	.125	.772	5.4	1.9	0.6	**1.0**	2.2	11.3
2009	Seattle	32	29	34.2	.392	.323	.797	6.7	2.6	0.8	0.5	2.8	12.2
2010^{†}	Seattle	**34**	**34**	30.8	.435	**.407**	.807	6.0	2.0	0.5	0.5	2.8	13.8
2011	Seattle	**34**	**34**	33.2	.396	.285	.846	**6.9**	2.4	0.9	0.6	2.7	13.3
2012	Chicago	**34**	**34**	30.0	.367	.281	.765	5.8	2.3	1.0	0.5	2.7	10.6
2013	Chicago	**34**	**34**	28.3	.415	.270	**.853**	5.6	2.2	0.9	0.5	1.8	9.3
2014	Atlanta	17	1	8.7	.233	.000	.400	0.9	0.7	0.3	0.1	0.7	1.5
2014	New York	15	4	16.2	.354	.010	.833	2.9	1.4	0.4	0.1	1.4	4.5
2014*	Total	32	5	12.5	.294	.005	.617	1.9	1.1	0.4	0.1	1.1	3.0
2015	New York	**34**	28	17.4	.376	.235	.727	2.4	1.4	0.2	0.0	**1.0**	4.5
2016	New York	31	23	19.5	.379	.125	.683	3.4	1.4	0.7	0.4	1.3	5.3
Career	15 years, 5 teams	479	432	28.1	.407	.276	.757	5.3	2.4	0.8	0.5	2.4	10.7

=== Postseason ===
Year	Team	GP	GS	MPG	FG%	3P%	FT%	RPG	APG	SPG	BPG	TO	PPG
2003^{†}	Detroit	8	8	36.1	.413	.200	.808	6.4	**4.4**	0.5	0.6	3.5	16.3
2005	Detroit	2	2	25.5	.308	.000	.727	4.5	3.5	1.5	**1.0**	2.0	8.0
2006^{†}	Detroit	10	10	26.5	.363	.000	.720	6.1	3.2	0.3	0.3	2.2	7.6
2007	Detroit	**11**	**11**	25.2	.451	.000	.565	3.8	1.6	0.4	0.1	1.6	8.6
2008	Seattle	3	0	14.7	.333	.000	.000	3.7	0.7	0.3	0.6	1.0	2.7
2009	Seattle	3	3	**38.7**	.487	.400	.840	5.3	1.7	**2.3**	**1.0**	2.0	**21.0**
2010^{†}	Seattle	7	7	31.4	**.506**	.500	.786	4.9	3.0	1.2	0.7	3.1	16.1
2011	Seattle	3	3	32.0	.333	.286	.750	**8.7**	2.0	1.0	0.6	1.3	7.0
2013	Chicago	2	2	27.8	.333	.000	**.875**	1.5	1.0	1.5	0.5	**1.0**	5.5
2015	New York	6	6	19.0	.316	.200	.714	3.0	1.7	0.8	0.5	1.1	3.8
2016	New York	1	1	11.6	.000	.000	.000	1.0	0.0	0.0	0.0	0.0	0.0
Career	11 years, 4 teams	56	53	27.5	.418	.319	.758	4.9	2.5	0.8	0.5	2.1	9.9

== Awards and achievements ==
- 1998 WBCA All-American.
- 2000 Big East Third Team
- 2000 Big East Tournament All Tournament Team
- 2002 Big East First Team
- 2002 Big East Tournament All Tournament Team
- 2002 NCAA basketball tournament Most Outstanding Player
- 2009 WNBA All-Star Selection (MVP)
- 2011 Honorary Doctorate of Public Service from Washington and Jefferson College
- 2011 WNBA All-Star Selection (MVP)
- Honoree of the Boys and Girls Clubs Alumni Hall of Fame
- 4× NBA Sears Shooting Stars Champion: 2007 (Detroit with Bill Laimbeer and Chauncey Billups), 2013-2015 (Team Chris Bosh, with Dominique Wilkins)
- 2016 National Civil Rights Museum Freedom Award
- 2020 Women's Basketball Hall of Fame Inductee

== See also ==
- List of Connecticut women's basketball players with 1000 points
