= WNBA Top 20@20 =

WNBA Top 20@20 are the Women's National Basketball Association's Top 20 Players of All Time, chosen in 2016 on the occasion of the twentieth season of the WNBA from amongst 60 nominees compiled by the league. The group was to comprise the 20 best and most influential players of the first twenty years of the WNBA, with consideration also accorded to sportsmanship, community service, leadership, and contribution to the growth of women's basketball; only players to have competed in the WNBA for at least two seasons, and fit at least three of seven criteria (WNBA championship, major individual award, a selection to either the All-WNBA Team, WNBA All-Defensive Team, or WNBA All-Star Game; a current ranking among the top 30 statistical career leaders; and a selection to either the WNBA's All-Decade Team or the WNBA's Top 15 Players of All Time) were considered.

The Top 20 players were announced on June 21, 2016 at ESPN's SportsCenter. Dawn Staley was the only member of both the WNBA's All-Decade Team (2006) and the WNBA's Top 15 Players of All Time (2011) absent from the Top 20 list.

== Players selected ==
- Note: all information only pertains to the first twenty years of the league's existence.

^	Denotes player who was still active in the WNBA at time of award
~	Inducted into the Women's Basketball Hall of Fame
	Inducted into the Naismith Memorial Basketball Hall of Fame

Player	Nationality	Position	Team(s)	League titles	League awards	All-Star Games	All-Decade Team	15 Years Team
Seimone Augustus^	United States	SF	Minnesota Lynx (2006–2019) Los Angeles Sparks (2020)	2011, 2013, 2015, 2017	Finals MVP (2011); ROY (2006); 6×All-WNBA	2006–2007, 2011, 2013–2015, 2017, 2018	—N/a	Nominated
Sue Bird^	United States	PG	Seattle Storm (2002–2022)	2004, 2010, 2018, 2020	KPSA (2011); 8×All-WNBA	2002–2003, 2005–2007, 2009, 2011, 2014–2015, 2017, 2018	Yes	Yes
Swin Cash^	United States	PF	Detroit Shock (2002–2007); Seattle Storm (2008–2011); Chicago Sky (2012–2013); Atlanta Dream (2014); New York Liberty (2014–2016)	2003, 2006, 2010	ASG MVP (2009, 2011); KPSA (2013); 2×All-WNBA	2003, 2005, 2007, 2011	Nominated	Nominated
Tamika Catchings^	United States	SF	Indiana Fever (2002–2016) (entire career)	2012	MVP (2011); Finals MVP (2012); ROY (2002); DPOY (2005, 2006, 2009, 2010, 2012); KPSA (2010, 2013); 12×All-WNBA	2002–2007, 2009–2011	Yes	Yes
Cynthia Cooper	United States	SG	Houston Comets (1997–2000, 2003) (entire career)	1997–2000	MVP (1997, 1998); Finals MVP (1997–2000); 4×All-WNBA	1999, 2000, 2003	Yes	Yes
Yolanda Griffith	United States	C	Sacramento Monarchs (1999–2007); Seattle Storm (2008); Indiana Fever (2009)	2005	MVP (1999); Finals MVP (2005); DPOY (1999); ASG MVP (2004); 5×All-WNBA	1999–2001, 2003–2007	Yes	Yes
Becky Hammon	United States; Russia	PG	New York Liberty (1999–2006); San Antonio Silver Stars/Stars (2007–2014)	None	KPSA (2014); 4×All-WNBA	2003, 2005–2007, 2009, 2011	Nominated	Yes
Lauren Jackson	Australia	C	Seattle Storm (2001–2012) (entire career)	2004, 2010	MVP (2003, 2007, 2010); Finals MVP (2010); DPOY (2007); 8×All-WNBA	2001–2003, 2005–2007, 2009, 2010	Yes	Yes
Lisa Leslie	United States	C	Los Angeles Sparks (1997–2009) (entire career)	2001, 2002	MVP (2001, 2004, 2006); Finals MVP (2001, 2002); ASG MVP (1999, 2001, 2002); DPOY (2004, 2008); 12×All-WNBA	1999–2006, 2009	Yes	Yes
Maya Moore^	United States	SF	Minnesota Lynx (2011–)	2011, 2013, 2015, 2017	MVP (2014); Finals MVP (2013); ASG MVP (2015); ROY (2011); 4×All-WNBA	2011, 2013-2015	—N/a	—N/a
Deanna Nolan	United States; Russia	SG	Detroit Shock (2001–2009) (entire career)	2003, 2006, 2008	Finals MVP (2006); 5×All-WNBA	2003-2007	Nominated	Nominated
Candace Parker^	United States	PF	Los Angeles Sparks (2008–2020); Chicago Sky (2021-)	2016, 2021	MVP (2008, 2013); ASG MVP (2013); Finals MVP (2016); ROY (2008); 6×All-WNBA	2011, 2013, 2014	—N/a	Nominated
Ticha Penicheiro	Portugal	PG	Sacramento Monarchs (1998–2009); Los Angeles Sparks (2010–2011); Chicago Sky (2012)	2005	3×All-WNBA	1999–2002	Honorable mention	Yes
Cappie Pondexter^	United States	SG	Phoenix Mercury (2006–2009); New York Liberty (2010–2014); Chicago Sky (2015-2017); Los Angeles Sparks (2018); Indiana Fever (2018)	2007, 2009	Finals MVP (2007); 4×All-WNBA	2006, 2007, 2009–2011	—N/a	Yes
Katie Smith	United States	SG	Minnesota Lynx (1999–2005); Detroit Shock (2005–2009); Washington Mystics (2010); Seattle Storm (2011–2012); New York Liberty (2013)	2006, 2008	Finals MVP (2008); 4×All-WNBA	2000–2006, 2009	Yes	Yes
Sheryl Swoopes	United States	SF	Houston Comets (1997–2000, 2002–2007); Seattle Storm (2008); Tulsa Shock (2011)	1997–2000	MVP (2000, 2002, 2005); DPOY (2000, 2002, 2003); ASG MVP (2005); 7×All-WNBA	1999, 2000, 2002–2006	Yes	Yes
Diana Taurasi^	United States	SG	Phoenix Mercury (2004–)	2007, 2009	MVP (2009); Finals MVP (2009); ROY (2004); 10×All-WNBA	2004–2007, 2009–2011, 2013-2014	Honorable mention	Yes
Tina Thompson	United States	SF	Houston Comets (1997–2008); Los Angeles Sparks (2009–2011); Seattle Storm (2012-2013)	1997–2000	ASG MVP (2000); 8×All-WNBA	1999–2004, 2006, 2007, 2009	Yes	Yes
Teresa Weatherspoon	United States	PG	New York Liberty (1997–2003); Los Angeles Sparks (2004)	None	DPOY (1997, 1998); 4×All-WNBA	1999–2003	Honorable mention	Yes
Lindsay Whalen^	United States	PG	Connecticut Sun (2004-2009); Minnesota Lynx (2010–2018)	2011, 2013, 2015, 2017	5×All-WNBA	2006, 2011, 2013-2015	No	No

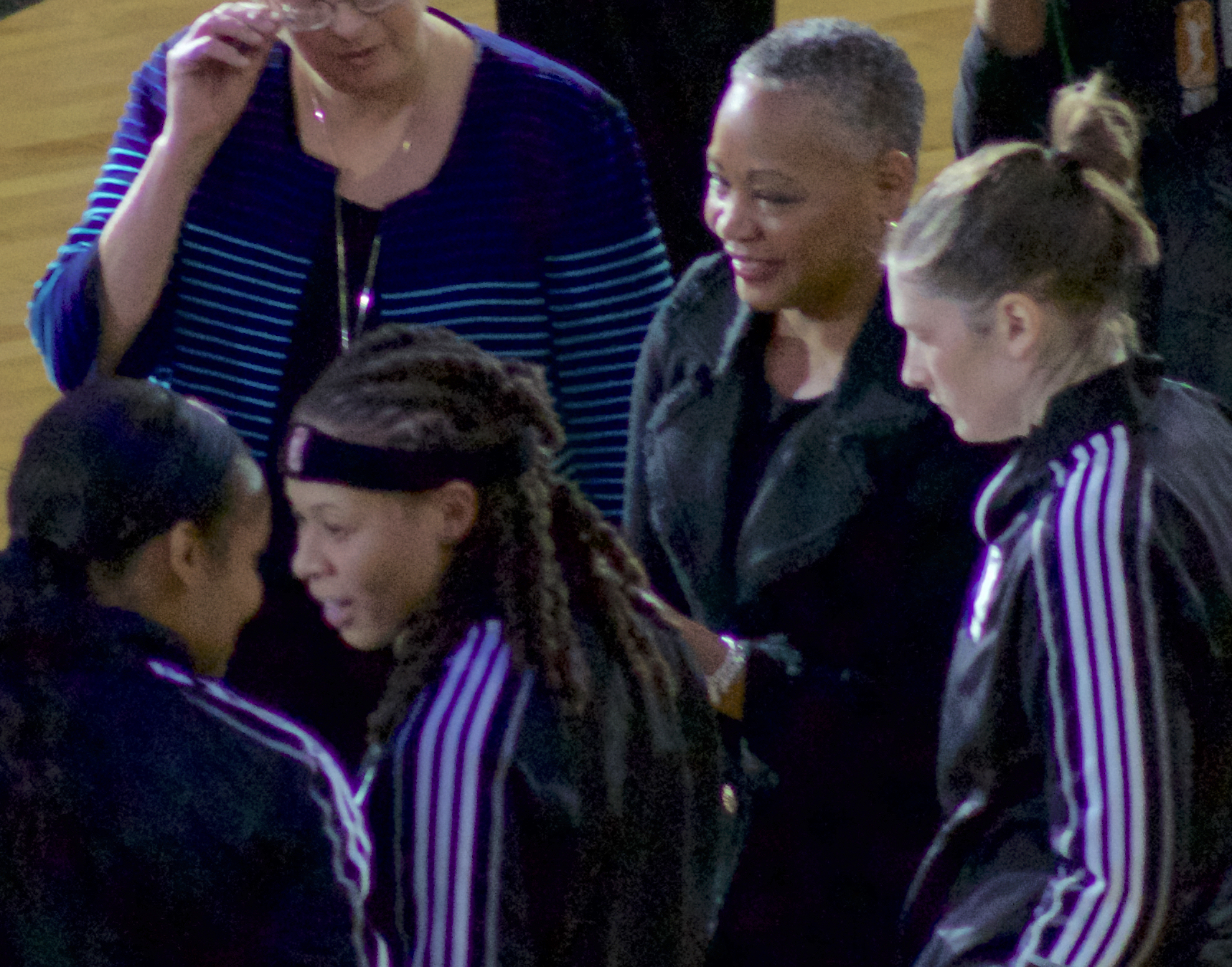
Part of the 20@20 ring ceremony, (left to right) Maya Moore, Seimone Augustus, WNBA president Lisa Borders, Lindsay Whalen

- The inaugural WNBA All-Star Game took place during the 1999 season, and the game has been contested in most years since. The 2004 edition was supplanted by a game between WNBA players from both conferences and the 2004 United States Olympic team, and the 2010 edition was a game between WNBA players from both conferences and the USA National Team. For the purposes of this article, appearances in the 2004 and 2010 games for both participating teams are considered All-Star appearances. This differs from the WNBA's practice, which does not count Team USA players in 2004 and 2010 as All-Stars, even though all members of Team USA except for Maya Moore in 2010 were WNBA players at the time of the two games. From 2008 through 2020, no All-Star Game was held in any Summer Olympic year. With the 2020 Summer Olympics being delayed to 2021 due to COVID-19, the league held an exhibition shortly before it took a break for the Olympics, with a WNBA all-star team taking on the USA national team. Unlike the analogous 2004 event, the 2021 game was officially treated as an All-Star Game.
- Players who were voted to start in all-star games but were unable to play due to injury are nevertheless considered to have been starters; players voted as reserves who started in place of other injured players are nevertheless considered to have been reserves.

== Other finalists ==
- Janeth Arcain^{5}
- Alana Beard^{1}
- Ruthie Bolton^{3}
- DeWanna Bonner^{1}
- Rebekkah Brunson^{1}
- Tina Charles^{1}
- Elena Delle Donne^{1}
- Érika de Souza^{1}
- Skylar Diggins^{1}
- Tamecka Dixon^{5}
- Katie Douglas^{6}
- Candice Dupree^{1}
- Margo Dydek^{7}
- Cheryl Ford^{6}
- Sylvia Fowles^{1}
- Jennifer Gillom^{5}
- Brittney Griner^{1}
- Chamique Holdsclaw^{3}
- Shannon Johnson^{4}
- Vickie Johnson^{5}
- Crystal Langhorne^{1}
- Kara Lawson
- Betty Lennox
- Mwadi Mabika^{5}
- Angel McCoughtry^{1}
- Taj McWilliams-Franklin^{4}
- DeLisha Milton-Jones^{4}
- Nneka Ogwumike^{1}
- Wendy Palmer
- Plenette Pierson^{1}
- Nicole Powell
- Ruth Riley
- Danielle Robinson^{1}
- Nykesha Sales^{4}
- Tangela Smith^{6}
- Dawn Staley^{2}
- Nikki Teasley
- Penny Taylor^{1, 6}
- Natalie Williams^{4}
- Sophia Young

^{1} Still active at time of Top 20 Team announcement.
^{2} Was in both the All-Decade and Top 15 teams.
^{3}All-Decade honorable mention, Top 15 nominee.
^{4}Nominated for both All-Decade and Top 15 teams.
^{5}All-Decade nominee.
^{6}Top 15 nominee.
^{7}Deceased.
