= WNBA's Top 15 Players of All Time =

Selected in 2011

The Women's National Basketball Association's Top 15 Players of All Time were chosen in 2011 on the occasion of the fifteenth season of the WNBA from amongst 30 nominees compiled by the league by fan, media, coach, and player voting. The group was to comprise the 15 best and most influential players of the first fifteen years of the WNBA, with consideration also accorded to sportsmanship, community service, leadership, and contribution to the growth of women's basketball; only players to have competed in the WNBA were eligible, but extra-league achievements were considered.

The Top 15 players were announced at halftime of the 2011 WNBA All-Star Game.

== Players selected ==
- Note: all information only pertains to the first fifteen years of the league's existence.

| ^ | Denotes player who was still active in the WNBA at time of award |
| ~ | Inducted into the Women's Basketball Hall of Fame |
| | Inducted into the Naismith Memorial Basketball Hall of Fame |

| Player | Nationality | Position | Team(s) | College(s) attended | Olympic medals | League titles | League awards | All-Star Games |
|---|---|---|---|---|---|---|---|---|
| Sue Bird^ | United States | PG | Seattle Storm (2002–2022) | Connecticut | 2004 gold 2008 gold 2012 gold 2016 gold 2020 gold | 2004, 2010, 2018, 2020 | KPSA (2011, 2017, 2018) | 2002–2007, 2009–2011, 2014, 2015, 2017, 2018 |
| Tamika Catchings^ | United States | SF | Indiana Fever (2002–2016) | Tennessee | 2004 gold 2008 gold | 2012 | MVP (2011); Finals MVP (2012); ROY (2002); DPOY (2005, 2006, 2009, 2010); KPSA (2010) | 2002–2007, 2009–2011 |
| Cynthia Cooper | United States | SG | Houston Comets (1997–2000, 2003) | USC | 1988 gold 1992 bronze | 1997–2000 | MVP (1997, 1998); Finals MVP (1997–2000) | 1999, 2000, 2003 |
| Yolanda Griffith | United States | C | Sacramento Monarchs (1997–2007); Seattle Storm (2008); Indiana Fever (2009) | Florida Atlantic | 2000 gold 2004 gold | 2005 | MVP (1999); Finals MVP (2005); DPOY (1999); ASG MVP (2004) | 1999–2001, 2003–2007 |
| Becky Hammon^ | United States; Russia | PG | New York Liberty (1999–2006); San Antonio Silver Stars/Stars (2007–2014) | Colorado State | 2008 bronze (RUS) | None | None | 2003–2007, 2009–2011 |
| Lauren Jackson^ | Australia | C | Seattle Storm (2001–2012) | N/A | 2000 silver 2004 silver 2008 silver (AUS) | 2004, 2010 | MVP (2003, 2007, 2010); Finals MVP (2010); DPOY (2007) | 2001–2003, 2005–2007, 2009, 2010 |
| Lisa Leslie | United States | C | Los Angeles Sparks (1997–2009) | USC | 1996 gold 2000 gold 2004 gold 2008 gold | 2001, 2002 | MVP (2001, 2004, 2006); Finals MVP (2001, 2002); ASG MVP (1999, 2001, 2002); DPOY (2004, 2008) | 1999–2006, 2009 |
| Ticha Penicheiro^ | Portugal | PG | Sacramento Monarchs (1998–2009); Los Angeles Sparks (2010–2011); Chicago Sky (2012) | Old Dominion | None | 2005 | None | 1999–2002 |
| Cappie Pondexter^ | United States | SG | Phoenix Mercury (2006–2009); New York Liberty (2010–2014); Chicago Sky (2015-2017); Los Angeles Sparks (2018); Indiana Fever (2018) | Rutgers | 2008 gold | 2007, 2009 | Finals MVP (2007) | 2006, 2007, 2009–2011 |
| Katie Smith^ | United States | SF | Minnesota Lynx (1999–2005); Detroit Shock (2006–2009); Washington Mystics (2010); Seattle Storm (2011–2012); New York Liberty (2013) | Ohio State | 2000 gold 2004 gold 2008 gold | 2006, 2008 | Finals MVP (2008) | 2000–2006, 2009 |
| Dawn Staley | United States | PG | Charlotte Sting (1999–2005); Houston Comets (2005–2006) | Virginia | 1996 gold 2000 gold 2004 gold | None | KPSA (1999, 2006) | 2002–2006 |
| Sheryl Swoopes^ | United States | SF | Houston Comets (1997–2007); Seattle Storm (2008); Tulsa Shock (2011) | Texas Tech | 1996 gold 2000 gold 2004 gold | 1997–2000 | MVP (2000, 2002, 2005); DPOY (2000, 2002, 2003); ASG MVP (2005) | 1999, 2000, 2002–2006 |
| Diana Taurasi^ | United States | SG | Phoenix Mercury (2004–2024) | Connecticut | 2004 gold 2008 gold 2012 gold 2016 gold 2020 gold 2024 gold | 2007, 2009, 2014 | MVP (2009); Finals MVP (2009, 2014); ROY (2004) | 2004–2007, 2009–2011 |
| Tina Thompson^ | United States | SF | Houston Comets (1997–2008); Los Angeles Sparks (2009–2011); Seattle Storm (2012-2013) | USC | 2004 gold 2008 gold | 1997–2000 | ASG MVP (2000) | 1999–2004, 2006, 2007, 2009 |
| Teresa Weatherspoon | United States | PG | New York Liberty (1997–2003); Los Angeles Sparks (2004) | Louisiana Tech | 1988 gold 1992 bronze | None | DPOY (1997, 1998) | 1999–2003 |

- The inaugural WNBA All-Star Game took place during the 1999 season, and the game has been contested yearly since, although the 2004 edition was supplanted by a game between WNBA players from both conferences and the 2004 United States Olympic team and the 2010 edition was a game between WNBA players from both conferences and the USA National Team. For the purposes of this article, appearances in the 2004 and 2010 games for both participating teams are considered All-Star appearances. This differs from the WNBA's practice, which does not count Team USA players in 2004 and 2010 as All-Stars, even though all members of Team USA except for Maya Moore in 2010 were WNBA players at the time of the two games. There was no All-Star Game held in 2008.
- Players who were voted to start in all-star games but were unable to play due to injury are nevertheless considered to have been starters; players voted as reserves who started in place of other injured players are nevertheless considered to have been reserves.

== Other finalists ==
- Seimone Augustus
- Ruthie Bolton^{1}
- Swin Cash
- Katie Douglas
- Cheryl Ford^{2}
- Chamique Holdsclaw^{1}
- Shannon Johnson^{1}
- Taj McWilliams-Franklin
- DeLisha Milton-Jones
- Deanna Nolan^{2}
- Candace Parker
- Nykesha Sales^{1}
- Tangela Smith
- Penny Taylor
- Natalie Williams^{1}

^{1} Retired at time of Top 15 Team announcement.
^{2} Not playing in the league at time of Top 15 Team announcement.

== Top 15 Players vs. All-Decade Team ==
All ten members of the WNBA's All-Decade Team were included in the Top 15 Team. There were some players that were nominated for the Top 15 Team that were not nominated for the All-Decade Team and vice versa. Below are lists of players that were either added to or omitted from the Top 15 Team nominations, in respect to the All-Decade Team nominations.

=== Added ===
- Maya Moore
- Seimone Augustus
- Sylvia Fowles
- Lindsay Whalen
- Sue Bird

=== Omitted ===
- Janeth Arcain
- Tamecka Dixon
- Jennifer Gillom
- Vickie Johnson
- Rebecca Lobo
- Mwadi Mabika
- Andrea Stinson
