= WNBA All-Decade Team =

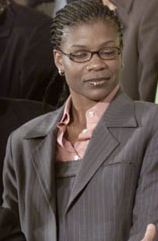
Sheryl Swoopes, 2001.

The Women's National Basketball Association's All-Decade Team were chosen in 2006 on the occasion of the tenth anniversary of the WNBA from amongst 30 nominees compiled by the league by fan, media, coach, and player voting. The team was to comprise the 10 best and most influential players of the first decade of the WNBA, with consideration also accorded to sportsmanship, community service, leadership, and contribution to the growth of women's basketball; only players to have competed in the WNBA were eligible, but extra-league achievements were considered.

Nine of the first team selections won Olympic gold medals with Team USA, and eight won league championships, including three—Cynthia Cooper-Dyke, Sheryl Swoopes, and Tina Thompson—who won four consecutive titles with the Houston Comets. Of the ten first-team honorees, only Cooper, who, having retired in 2000 to become head coach of the Phoenix Mercury, played four games during the 2003 season before finally ending her playing career, was not an active player when the team was announced. Swoopes, Thompson, and Lisa Leslie (Los Angeles Sparks) were the only three first team selections to have been drafted in 1997 and to have played in each of the ten seasons of the WNBA. Thompson and Leslie were among the six players who only played on one team their entire careers.

== Players selected ==
^	Denotes player who was still active in the WNBA at time of award
~	Inducted into the Women's Basketball Hall of Fame
	Inducted into the Naismith Memorial Basketball Hall of Fame

=== All-Decade Team ===
- Note: all information only pertains to the first ten seasons of the league's existence.

Player	Nationality	Position	Team(s) played for	College(s) attended	Olympic medals	League titles	League awards	All-Star Games
Sue Bird^	United States	PG	Seattle Storm (2002–2022)	Connecticut	2004 gold	2004	None	2002–2006
Tamika Catchings^	United States	SF	Indiana Fever (2002–2016)	Tennessee	2004 gold	None	DPOY (2005, 2006); ROY (2002)	2002–2006
Cynthia Cooper-Dyke	United States	SG	Houston Comets (1997–2000, 2003)	USC	1988 gold 1992 bronze	1997–2000	MVP (1997, 1998); Finals MVP (1997–2000)	1999, 2000, 2003
Yolanda Griffith^	United States	C	Sacramento Monarchs (1999–2007); Seattle Storm (2008); Indiana Fever (2009)	Florida Atlantic	2000 gold 2004 gold	2005	MVP (1999); DPOY (1999)	1999–2001, 2003–2006
Lauren Jackson^	Australia	C	Seattle Storm (2001–2012)	N/A	2000 silver 2004 silver	2004	MVP (2003)	2001–2003, 2005, 2006
Lisa Leslie^	United States	C	Los Angeles Sparks (1997–2009)	USC	1996 gold 2000 gold 2004 gold	2001, 2002	MVP (2001, 2004); DPOY (2004); Finals MVP (2001, 2002); ASG MVP (1999, 2001, 2002)	1999–2006
Katie Smith^	United States	SF	Minnesota Lynx (1999–2005); Detroit Shock (2006–2009); Washington Mystics (2010); Seattle Storm (2011-2012); New York Liberty (2013)	Ohio State	2000 gold 2004 gold	2006	None	2000–2006
Dawn Staley^	United States	PG	Charlotte Sting (1999–2005); Houston Comets (2005–2006)	Virginia	1996 gold 2000 gold 2004 gold	None	KPSA (1999, 2006)	2002–2006
Sheryl Swoopes^	United States	F	Houston Comets (1997–2007); Seattle Storm (2008); Tulsa Shock (2011)	Texas Tech	1996 gold 2000 gold 2004 gold	1997–2000	MVP (2000, 2002, 2005); DPOY (2000, 2002, 2003); ASG MVP (2005)	1999, 2000, 2002–2006
Tina Thompson^	United States	F	Houston Comets (1997–2008); Los Angeles Sparks (2009-2011); Seattle Storm (2012-2013)	USC	2004 gold	1997–2000	ASG MVP (2000)	1999–2004, 2006

=== Honorable mention ===
Player	Nationality	Position	Team(s) played for	College(s) attended	Olympic medals	League titles	League awards	All-Star Games
Ruthie Bolton	United States	SG	Sacramento Monarchs (1997–2004)	Auburn	1996 gold 2000 gold	None	None	1999, 2001
Chamique Holdsclaw^	United States	F	Washington Mystics (1999–2004); Los Angeles Sparks (2005–2007); Atlanta Dream (2009); San Antonio Silver Stars (2010)	Tennessee	2000 gold	None	ROY (1999)	1999–2003, 2005
Ticha Penicheiro^	Portugal	PG	Sacramento Monarchs (1998–2009); Los Angeles Sparks (2010–2011); Chicago Sky (2012)	Old Dominion	None	2005	None	1999–2002
Diana Taurasi^	United States	SG	Phoenix Mercury (2004–)	Connecticut	2004 gold	None	ROY (2004)	2004–2006
Teresa Weatherspoon	United States	PG	New York Liberty (1997–2003); Los Angeles Sparks (2004)	Louisiana Tech	1988 gold 1992 bronze	None	DPOY (1997, 1998)	1999–2003

- Each woman, save Lauren Jackson (Australia), won her Olympic medal(s) competing for the United States.
- The inaugural WNBA All-Star Game took place during the 1999 season, and the game has been contested yearly since, although the 2004 edition was supplanted by a game between WNBA players from both conferences and the 2004 United States Olympic team. Appearances in the 2004 game are still considered All-Star appearances.
- Players who were voted to start in all-star games but were unable to play due to injury are nevertheless considered to have been starters; players voted as reserves who started in place of other injured players are nevertheless considered to have been reserves.

== Other finalists ==
- Janeth Arcain
- Swin Cash
- Tamecka Dixon
- Jennifer Gillom^{1}
- Becky Hammon
- Shannon Johnson
- Vickie Johnson
- Rebecca Lobo^{1}
- Mwadi Mabika
- Taj McWilliams-Franklin
- DeLisha Milton-Jones
- Deanna Nolan
- Nykesha Sales
- Andrea Stinson
- Natalie Williams^{1}

^{1} Retired at time of All-Decade Team announcement.
