= Candace Parker =

American basketball player (born 1986)

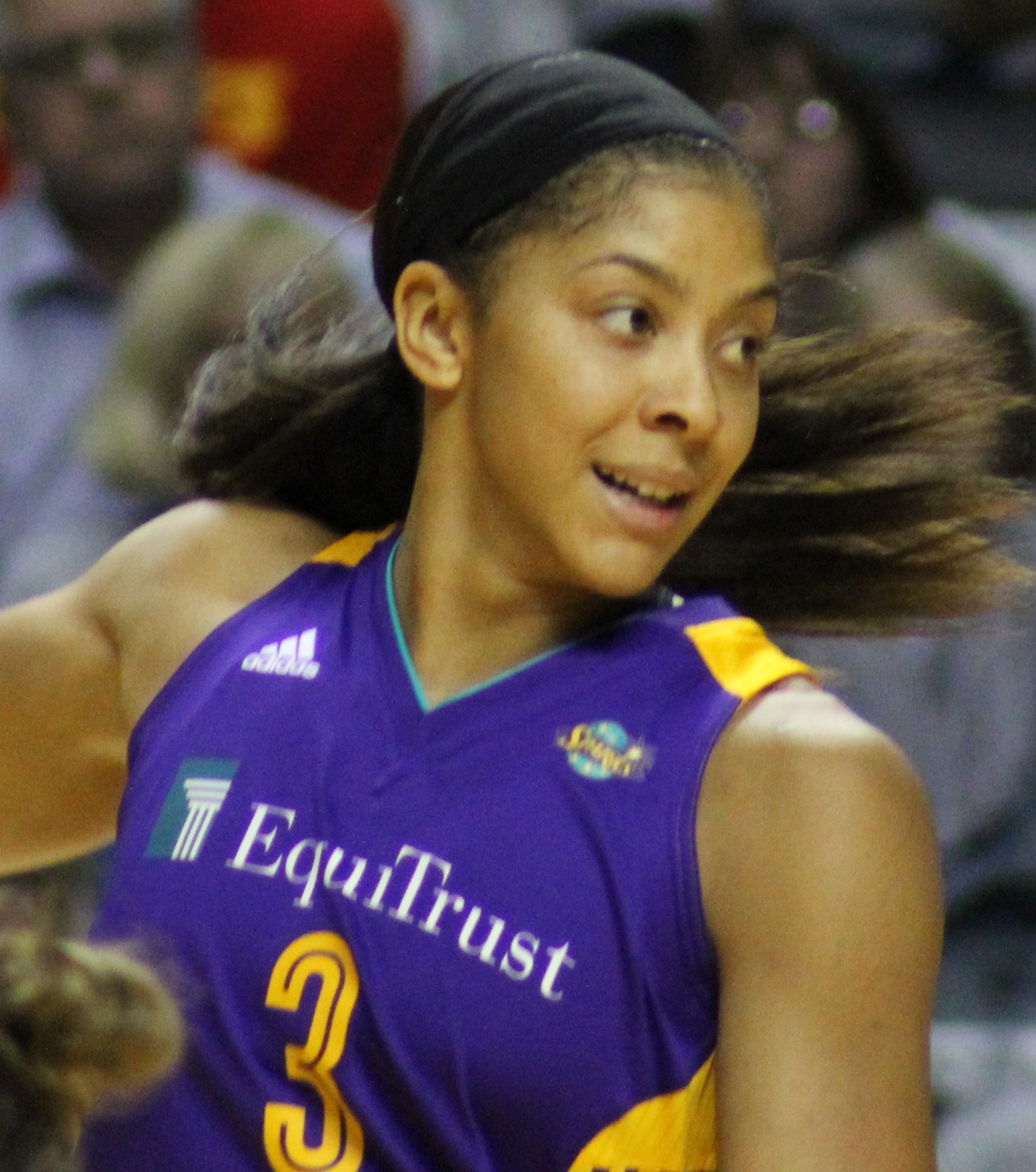
- Parker in 2017

Personal information
- Born: April 19, 1986 (age 40) St. Louis, Missouri, U.S.
- Listed height: 6 ft 4 in (1.93 m)
- Listed weight: 184 lb (83 kg)

Career information
- High school: Naperville Central (Naperville, Illinois)
- College: Tennessee (2004–2008)
- WNBA draft: 2008: 1st round, 1st overall pick
- Drafted by: Los Angeles Sparks
- Playing career: 2008–2023
- Position: Power forward
- Number: 3

Career history
- 2008–2020: Los Angeles Sparks
- 2010–2015: UMMC Ekaterinburg
- 2016: Guangdong Dolphins
- 2017: Fenerbahçe
- 2017–2018: Xinjiang Tianshan Deers
- 2021–2022: Chicago Sky
- 2023: Las Vegas Aces

Career highlights
- 3× WNBA champion (2016, 2021, 2023); WNBA Finals MVP (2016); 2× WNBA MVP (2008, 2013); 7× WNBA All-Star (2011, 2013, 2014, 2017, 2018, 2021, 2022); WNBA All-Star Game MVP (2013); 7× All-WNBA First Team (2008, 2012–2014, 2017, 2020, 2022); 3× All-WNBA Second Team (2009, 2015, 2018); 2× WNBA All-Defensive Second Team (2009, 2012); WNBA Rookie of the Year (2008); WNBA All-Rookie Team (2008); WNBA Defensive Player of the Year (2020); WNBA assists leader (2015); 3× WNBA rebounding leader (2008, 2009, 2020); 2× WNBA blocks leader (2009, 2012); 3× WNBA peak performer (2008, 2009, 2020); WNBA anniversary teams (20th, 25th); No. 3 retired by Los Angeles Sparks; No. 3 retired by Chicago Sky; 5× Russian National League champion (2011–2015); 4× Russian Cup winner (2011–2014); EuroLeague champion (2013); 2× NCAA champion (2007, 2008); 2× NCAA Tournament MOP (2007, 2008); 2× AP Female Athlete of the Year (2008, 2021); AP Player of the Year (2008); 2× USBWA Player of the Year (2007, 2008); Naismith College Player of the Year (2008); Women's Basketball Academic All-American of the Year (2008); 2× John R. Wooden Award (2007, 2008); Wade Trophy (2007); 2× Honda Sports Award for basketball (2007, 2008); Honda-Broderick Cup (2008); 3× All-American – Kodak/State Farm Coaches', USBWA (2006–2008); 2× First-team All-American – AP (2007, 2008); Second-team All-American – AP (2006); SEC Female Athlete of the Year (2008); SEC Player of the Year (2007); 2× SEC Tournament MVP (2006, 2008); 3× First-team All-SEC (2006–2008); SEC Freshman of the Year (2006); SEC All-Freshman Team (2006); 2× Gatorade National Player of the Year (2003, 2004); Naismith Prep Player of the Year (2003, 2004); Gatorade Female Athlete of the Year (2004); McDonald's All-American (2004); Morgan Wootten Player of the Year (2004); 3× Illinois Miss Basketball (2002–2004)
- Stats at WNBA.com
- Stats at Basketball Reference
- Women's Basketball Hall of Fame
Medals
Women's basketball
Representing the United States
Olympic Games
Gold medal – first place	2008 Beijing	Team
Gold medal – first place	2012 London	Team
FIBA Under-18 Americas Championship
Gold medal – first place	2004 Puerto Rico	Team

Candace Nicole Parker (born April 19, 1986), nicknamed "Ace", is an American former professional basketball player. Widely regarded as one of the greatest WNBA players of all time, she was selected as the first overall pick in the 2008 WNBA draft by the Los Angeles Sparks. She spent 13 seasons on the Sparks, two seasons with the Chicago Sky, and one season with the Las Vegas Aces, winning a championship with each team. Parker is credited with growing the popularity of women's basketball. In June 2026, she was inducted into the Women Basketball Hall of Fame. She was inducted into the Naismith Basketball Hall of Fame in 2026.

A versatile player, Parker mainly played the forward and center positions. In high school, Parker won the 2003 and 2004 Gatorade National Girls Basketball Player of the Year awards, becoming just the second junior and the only woman to receive a Gatorade Basketball Player of the Year award twice. Parker played college basketball for the Tennessee Lady Vols, she led the team to two consecutive national championships (2007, 2008), was named the Final Four's most outstanding player in both occasions and was a two-time consensus national player of the year. As a redshirt freshman, she became the first woman to dunk in an NCAA tournament game and the first woman to dunk twice in a college game. After being selected in the WNBA Draft, Parker signed long-term endorsement deals with Adidas and Gatorade.

In 2016, Parker led the Sparks to win their first WNBA Finals title since 2002 and won the WNBA Finals MVP Award. In 2021, she helped the Sky win their first title. She won her third title in 2023 with the Aces. Parker won two WNBA Most Valuable Player Awards (2008, 2013), a WNBA All-Star Game MVP Award (2013), two Olympic gold medals (2008, 2012), and the WNBA Rookie of the Year Award (2008). She was selected to six All-WNBA teams and five All-Star teams, and was the first player to win the Rookie of the Year and the MVP awards in the same season. Parker became the second player to dunk in a WNBA game on June 22, 2008.

Since 2018, Parker has been an analyst and commentator for TNT Sports, providing coverage for NBA games on TNT and NBA TV and for the NCAA men's basketball tournament.

Following her retirement in spring of 2024, Parker was named president of Adidas women's basketball.

== Early life ==
Parker was born on April 19, 1986, in St. Louis, Missouri. She has two older brothers, including former NBA basketball player Anthony Parker.

Parker moved with her family to Naperville, Illinois at the age of two, where she spent her childhood. Her family loved basketball and she began playing at age six. Her father Larry played basketball at Joliet West HS and the University of Iowa in the 1970s. The Parker family were also Chicago Bulls fans. Candace was worried about playing basketball, fearing she would not live up to the level of play her father and brother demonstrated, so she focused on playing soccer. It wasn't until the eighth grade that her family convinced her to play competitive basketball. Her father helped coach and critique her. Parker said of the experience, "He did things to make me mad, to challenge me, because I was so much more athletic and had so much more knowledge of the game than everyone else that sometimes I just coasted. If me and my dad went to a park and he didn't think I was practicing hard enough, he'd just get in the car and leave. And I'd have to run home. I mean run home. Once I figured that out, I'd always try to go to close-by parks."

== High school career ==
Like her older brother Anthony Parker, she attended Naperville Central High School in Naperville, Illinois. Parker led her high school basketball team to Class AA state titles in 2003 and 2004, and compiled a school-record 2,768 points (22.9 points per game) and 1,592 rebounds (13.2 rebounds per game) while starting 119 of the 121 games in which she played.

She is the only two-time award winner of the USA Today High School Player of the Year, winning the award in 2003 and 2004. Parker also won the Naismith Prep Player of the Year Award and Gatorade Female Basketball Player of the Year Award in 2002 and 2003. In 2004, she was named Gatorade Female Athlete of the Year, WBCA All-American and McDonald's All-American. She participated in the 2004 WCBA All-America Game where she scored nine points. She was also selected as the 'Ms. Basketball' player of the year in Illinois in 2002, 2003, and 2004, and was a four-year member of the Illinois Basketball Coaches Association All-State first team.

On December 27, 2001, Parker dunked for the first time in competition as a 15-year-old sophomore at Naperville Central High School. This is believed to be the first slam dunk by a female athlete in Illinois. On March 29, 2004, Parker won the slam dunk contest at McDonald's All-American Game, becoming the first woman to win the event and beating the likes of Josh Smith and J. R. Smith.

On November 11, 2003, during her senior year, Parker announced her commitment to Tennessee on ESPNEWS, becoming the first women's player to announce the oral commitment live on the network.

In August 2004, Parker led the undefeated USA Junior World Championship team to a gold medal with 16.6 points and 8.8 rebounds per game. While training, Parker had a relapse of knee pain and was required to undergo surgery both the lateral meniscus and the lateral articular cartilage in her left knee.

She wears the number 3 on her jersey to honor former NBA player Allen Iverson who encouraged her during her high school career.

== College career ==
Parker entered the University of Tennessee in the fall of 2004. On February 17, 2005, Tennessee announced Parker would redshirt her first season due to a knee injury she had suffered in a summer league game.

Parker started for the Tennessee Lady Vols during the 2005–06 season. She was listed on the roster as a forward, center, and guard. On March 19, 2006, in an NCAA tournament first-round game against Army, she became the first woman to dunk in an NCAA tournament game, then became the first woman to dunk twice in an NCAA tournament game. She was the SEC Rookie of the Year (Coaches and AP) and helped the Lady Vols win the 2006 SEC tournament championship. With 17 seconds remaining in the SEC tournament championship game against LSU, Parker hit the game-winning shot. She was named tournament MVP and was named to the 2006 Kodak All-America team, making her one of the few to ever receive the award as a freshman. However, in the NCAA tournament regional finals against North Carolina, Parker got in early foul trouble and was out of the game for much of the first half. Tennessee ultimately lost the game.

Parker was the only college player named to the USA squad for the 2006 FIBA World Championship for Women in Brazil. The USA squad finished in third place.

In a January 28, 2007, away game against Alabama, in her sophomore season, Parker became the fastest player in Lady Vols history to score 1,000 career points. She achieved the record in 56 games, beating Chamique Holdsclaw's mark of 57 games and Tamika Catchings's of 58 games. On March 1, at the SEC tournament in Duluth, Georgia, Parker was named the 2007 SEC Player of the Year. On April 3, she led the Lady Vols to their first national championship since 1998, beating Rutgers 59–46. Parker finished the game with 17 points and earned the tournament's Most Outstanding Player honor.

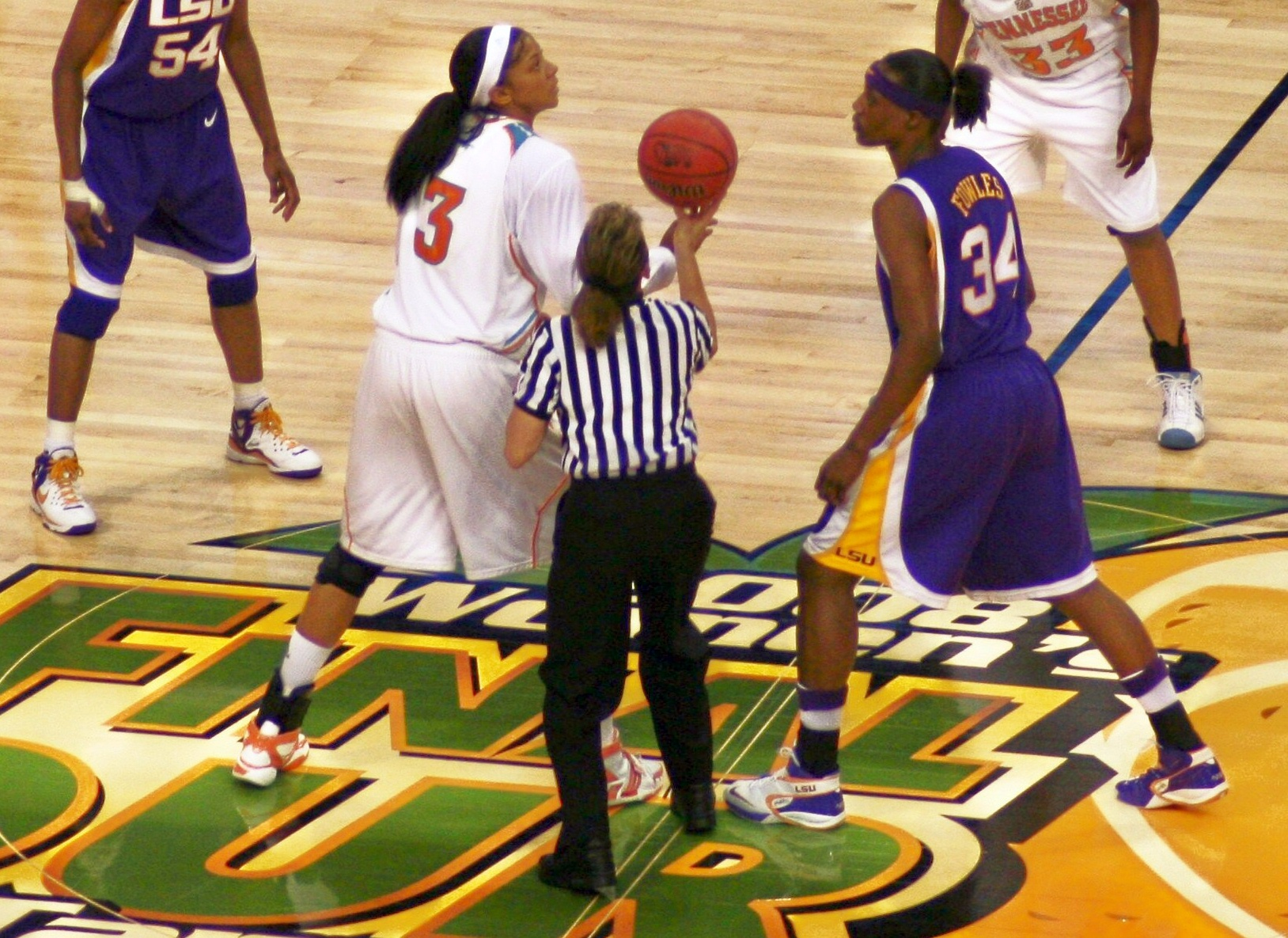
Parker (left) gets ready for the jump ball against Sylvia Fowles (right)

On February 21, 2008, Parker announced that she would forgo her final season of eligibility at Tennessee in order to focus on the 2008 Olympics and pursue a professional career in basketball. On April 8, 2008, despite having suffered a dislocated shoulder in the regional final, Parker led the Lady Vols to their second straight NCAA women's title, the eighth championship for Tennessee and the last for legendary coach Pat Summitt. She was also named the Most Outstanding Player for the second consecutive NCAA tournament, joining Cheryl Miller, Chamique Holdsclaw, and Diana Taurasi as the only female players to have done so.

She graduated with her incoming class in May 2008. A sports management major who had a 3.35 grade-point average as of December 2007, she was named University Division I Academic All-American of the Year in women's basketball for 2008 by the College Sports Information Directors of America. While at Tennessee, she compiled a record of 100 wins and 10 losses and averaged 19.4 points, 8.8 rebounds, 2.6 assists, 1.9 steals, and 2.4 blocks per game.

In October 2025, the Associated Press selected Parker as one of the greatest collegiate players in the women's poll era alongside Caitlin Clark, Cheryl Miller, Diana Taurasi, and Breanna Stewart as the starting five players.

== WNBA career ==
=== Los Angeles Sparks (2008–2020) ===
==== 2008: Rookie of the Year and MVP season ====
Parker was selected as the first pick in the 2008 WNBA draft by the Los Angeles Sparks on April 9, 2008, one day after winning the NCAA title. She played alongside Olympic teammates Lisa Leslie and DeLisha Milton-Jones. Shannon Bobbitt, Parker's teammate at Tennessee, joined the Sparks after being drafted in the second round.

On May 17, 2008, in her debut game against the Phoenix Mercury, she had 34 points, 12 rebounds, and 8 assists. Her 34 points broke the record for a rookie in a debut game, previously held by Cynthia Cooper with 25 points in her debut game in 1997. It is a record that still stands as of 2025.

On May 29, 2008, Parker posted a 16 points, 16 rebounds, 6 blocks, 5 assists, and 5 steals, becoming the only woman in WNBA history to post a 5x5 stat line.

On June 22, 2008, she became the second woman in WNBA history—after her teammate Lisa Leslie—to dunk during a regulation WNBA game, against the Indiana Fever. The dunk was on the same basket as Lisa Leslie's. On June 24, 2008, she became the first player to dunk twice in their WNBA career, during a regulation game against the Seattle Storm.

Parker was named the Hanns-G 'Go Beyond' Rookie of the Month for the months of May and July 2008.

On July 9, 2008, Parker scored a career-high 40 points, along with 16 rebounds and 6 assists, in an 82–74 overtime win against the Houston Comets.

Parker was one of 11 people suspended in the Sparks-Shock brawl on July 21, 2008.

In July and August 2008, the WNBA suspended play for a couple of weeks to allow their players to join the national teams at the 2008 Summer Olympics. Parker was selected to go, and the US team cruised with eight straight victories to win the gold medal. Parker averaged 9.4 points and 4.5 rebounds per game, and scored 14 points in the final game.

On October 3, 2008, Parker became the first WNBA player to win both the Rookie of the Year and the Most Valuable Player awards in the same season, joining Wilt Chamberlain and Wes Unseld as the only professional American basketball players to win both ROY and MVP trophies in the same season.

==== 2009–2011: Pregnancy and injuries ====
Parker missed the first eight games of the 2009 WNBA season after giving birth to her daughter, Lailaa Nicole Williams. By this time, the Sparks had acquired Tina Thompson and Betty Lennox to help carry the team during Parker's absence. On June 30, Parker returned to practice with her teammates. She played her first game back from maternity leave on July 5, 2009. Parker was named to the All-WNBA second team and All-Defensive second team, despite having missed almost a full month due to her maternity leave. She had averaged a career-low in scoring but led the league in rebounding by the end of the season. Parker helped the Sparks get to the Western Conference Finals, but lost in three games to the eventual champions, the Phoenix Mercury. In the playoffs, Parker averaged 18 points and 10.7 rebounds per game.

In 2010, Parker played only 10 games and was sidelined for the rest of the season due to a shoulder injury; she would also miss the playoffs. In 2011, Parker played her first six games. During the seventh game, with 5:56 left in the third quarter, Parker went down after grabbing a defensive rebound and making brief contact with Quanitra Hollingsworth. After getting an MRI on June 27, she found out she had a torn meniscus in her right knee. She had been voted as an All-Star during the season, but the injury would cause her to miss the 2011 WNBA All-Star Game. Six weeks later, she returned and played the remainder of the season, but the Sparks were eliminated from playoff contention with a disappointing 15–19 record.

==== 2012–2013: Comeback and second MVP season ====
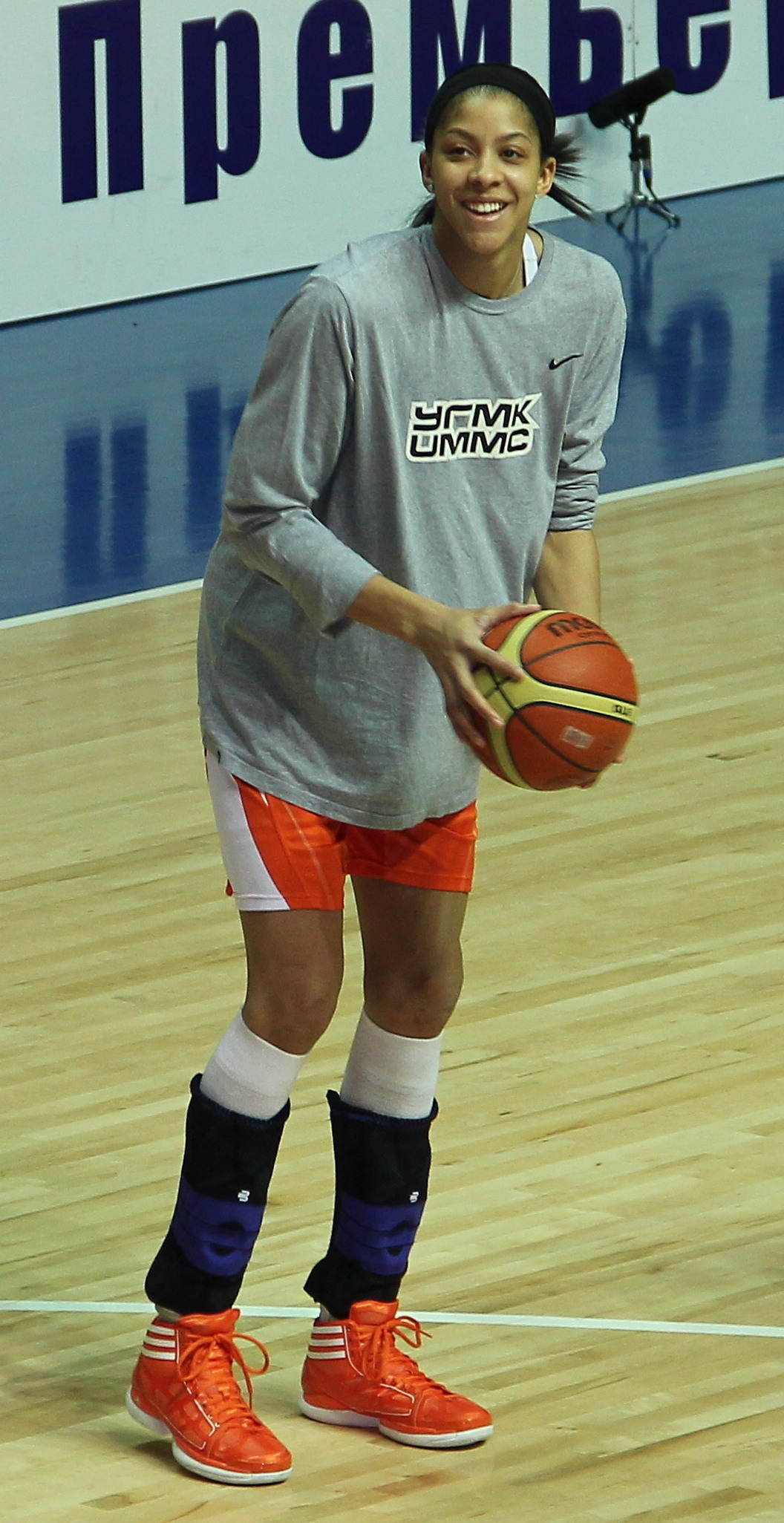
Parker in 2012

In 2012, Parker had re-signed with the Sparks to a multi-year deal once her rookie contract expired. She had played the full season and helped her team to a 24–10 record, making the playoffs as the second seed in the west. In the first round, they beat the San Antonio Stars two games to none. In the Western Conference Finals, against the Minnesota Lynx, the Sparks lost two games to none, while Parker scored 33 points, grabbed 15 rebounds, and had 4 blocks in a must-win game two, which they lost, 80–79, therefore ending their season. Parker was very emotional following the loss, hugging her mother Sara in tears.

On July 27, 2013, in her sixth season, Parker played in her first All-Star game. She scored 23 points and grabbed 11 rebounds in a come from behind win for the West and was named WNBA All-Star MVP. The Sparks finished with the same record (24–10) as the year earlier, again earning the second seed in the Western Conference. On September 19, Parker was named the 2013 WNBA Most Valuable Player. Parker became the fifth player to earn multiple WNBA MVP awards, joining Lisa Leslie (3), Sheryl Swoopes (3), Lauren Jackson (3) and Cynthia Cooper (2). The Sparks faced the Phoenix Mercury in the Western Conference Semifinals. In game one, at Staples Center, the Sparks lost, forcing them to win in game two at Phoenix to stay in the series. In game two, Parker scored 31 points and had 11 rebounds to lead the Sparks to a win, bringing the series back to L.A. for a game three. In a nailbiter, the Sparks lost on a jumper by Phoenix rookie Brittney Griner made with seconds remaining, ending the Sparks' season by one point for the second straight year.

==== 2014: Ownership and coaching changes ====
In January 2014, Williams Group Holdings abruptly announced they would relinquish their ownership of the Sparks. For a brief time, the Sparks future in Los Angeles was in some jeopardy. Despite major uncertainty, a month later the team was purchased by an investment group including Magic Johnson, with promises of bringing a championship to Los Angeles. The team went into the All-Star break with an unexpected 10–12 record. Immediately after the break, head coach Carol Ross was let go and General Manager and former player, Penny Toler, assumed the position of coach for the remainder of the season. Parker led her team to finish with a 16–18 record and clinched the number 4 seed to head to the playoffs for the 14th time in franchise history and 6th time for Parker. Despite enormous effort from her in the series, they lost 72–75 in Game 1 and 93–68 in Game 2 to the eventual champions the Phoenix Mercury, marking the second consecutive year the Mercury knocked the Sparks out of the playoffs in the semi-final round. Parker averaged 19.4 points, 7.1 rebounds, 4.3 assists, and 1.3 blocks per game in the regular season.

==== 2016: Loss of Coach Summitt and first WNBA championship ====
In 2016, Parker re-signed with the Sparks as an unrestricted free agent. During the season, Parker averaged 15.3 points per game, becoming the team's second option next to Nneka Ogwumike who led the team in scoring and won the MVP award. However, in late June, Parker's college coach and mentor, Pat Summitt, died at the age of 64 from Alzheimer's disease. That night, against the Dallas Wings, Parker had an incredible performance in the second half, finishing the game with 31 points, and had her season high of rebounding with 13, guiding her team to a victory. In an emotional post-game interview, she dedicated the season to Summitt. With a supporting cast of Nneka Ogwumike and Kristi Toliver, the Sparks were a championship contender in the league, finishing 26–8. With the WNBA's new playoff format in effect, the Sparks were the number 2 seed in the league with a double-bye to the semi-finals (the last round before the WNBA Finals) facing the Chicago Sky. The Sparks defeated the Sky 3–1 in the series, advancing to the WNBA Finals for the first time since 2003.

In the WNBA Finals, it was only the second time in league history where two teams from the same conference faced each other in the Finals due to the new playoff format, as the Sparks faced the championship-defending Minnesota Lynx. This finals series proved to be the best the WNBA had ever seen, with Parker being at the forefront of the Sparks' success. For Game 3, in Los Angeles, Parker put up her best performance of the finals thus far, contributing 24 points, 9 rebounds, and 2 assists to help the Sparks take a 2–1 series lead, with a dominant 92–75 win. This put Parker one win away from her first title, as the Sparks already had one victory in their hands. However, the Lynx upset the Sparks on their home court in Game 4 with an 85–79 win, forcing a winner-take-all Game 5. The Sparks would end up winning the decisive Game 5 on the road, that ended with a game winning close range shot by Parker's teammate, Nneka Ogwumike, who put the Sparks ahead 77–76 with 3.1 seconds remaining after grabbing an offensive rebound. The Sparks claimed their first championship since 2002. After the game, an emotional Parker uttered the words "this is for Pat," implying that the championship win was in honor of Pat Summitt. Parker won her first championship and won Finals MVP. In Game 5 of the series, Parker had scored a game-high 28 points along with 12 rebounds. Also in 2016, Parker was named in the WNBA Top 20@20, a list of the league's best 20 players ever in celebration of the WNBA's twentieth anniversary.

==== 2017–2020: Final years with the Sparks ====
In February 2017, Parker signed a multi-year contract extension with the Sparks. During the 2017 season, Parker was voted into the 2017 WNBA All-Star Game, making it her fourth all-star nomination. On July 28, 2017, Parker became the sixth player in league history to record a triple-double in an 85–73 win over the San Antonio Stars as she scored 11 points, tied her career-high of 17 rebounds along with a career-high 11 assists. She would finish the season averaging 16.9 points per game, as the Sparks repeated the same regular season success as last year as the number 2 seed in the league with a 26–8 record, receiving a double-bye to the semi-finals. In the semi-finals, the Sparks defeated the Phoenix Mercury in a 3-game sweep. The series ended on a game-winning layup by Parker with 2.9 seconds left in Game 3, putting the Sparks up 89–87 as they advanced to the WNBA Finals for the second season in a row, setting up a rematch with the Minnesota Lynx. In Game 3 of the 2017 WNBA Finals, Parker set the record for most steals in a Finals game with 5 steals along with 13 points, 7 rebounds, 5 assists and 3 blocks in a 75–64 win, putting the Sparks up 2–1 in the series. However, the Sparks would lose the next two games, failing to win back-to-back championships as they lost to the Lynx in five games.

On July 10, 2018, Parker made history with a stat line of 21 points, 10 assists, 9 rebounds, 4 steals and 2 blocks in a 77–75 overtime victory against the Seattle Storm, making her the first player in WNBA history to achieve such a stat line. On July 15, 2018, Parker scored a season-high 34 points along with 11 rebounds and 9 assists in a 99–78 victory over the Las Vegas Aces. On July 19, 2018, Parker was voted into the 2018 WNBA All-Star Game, making it her fifth all-star nomination. Parker finished off the season, averaging 17.9 ppg and the Sparks finished as the number 6 seed with a 19–15 record. In the first-round elimination game, they faced the rival Minnesota Lynx, in which they won 75–68 to advance to the second round. In the second-round elimination game, the Sparks lost 96–64 to the Washington Mystics, ending their run of two consecutive finals appearances.

In May 2019, Parker suffered a hamstring injury during the Sparks' first preseason game and was ruled out 3–5 weeks. Parker made her season debut on June 18, 2019, she scored 3 points on 1-of-9 shooting from the field in an 81–52 loss to the Washington Mystics. On August 4, 2019, Parker scored a season-high 21 points in an 83–75 victory over the Seattle Storm. On September 3, 2019, Parker tied her season-high of 21 points in a 70–60 victory over the Atlanta Dream. The Sparks ended up finishing as the number 3 seed with a 22–12 record, receiving a bye to the second round. In the second-round elimination game, the Sparks defeated the defending champions Seattle Storm 92–69. However, in the semi-finals, the Sparks were eliminated in a three-game sweep by the Connecticut Sun.

In the 2020 season, which was shortened and took place in a "bubble" at IMG Academy due to the COVID-19 pandemic, Parker started all 22 games for the Sparks. She posted a 51% field goal percentage, her best since 2011, and averaged 14.7 points per game. She led the league in rebounding (9.7 per game) and recorded a league-leading 10 double-double performances. The Sparks earned the third-seed and a first-round bye in the playoffs, but lost a single-elimination game to the seventh-seeded Connecticut Sun in the second round. Parker was named Defensive Player of the Year for the first time in her career. However, she was controversially left off the first and second WNBA All-Defensive Teams. The discrepancy arose because media members vote on the Defensive Player of the Year Award while coaches vote on the All-Defensive Teams.

=== Chicago Sky (2021–2022) ===
==== 2021: Second championship ====
In 2021, Parker became an unrestricted free agent. She chose to leave the Sparks after 13 seasons, signing a 2-year deal with the Chicago Sky. The move to the Sky gave her the opportunity to play a little closer to home and compete for another championship. Parker stated "Chicago is where my family raised me; where I first learned the game of basketball; and where I first fell in love with this orange ball.....I am excited to continue the next chapter of my career where it all began. To my new teammates, my new organization, and my new fans: I'm home."

During the season, Parker was named to The W25, consisting of the 25 players considered by a panel of media and pioneering women's basketball figures to have been the best and most influential in the league's 25 seasons. The regular season ended with Parker and the Sky earning the #6 seed in that season's playoffs. They won two single elimination games, followed by an upset of the Connecticut Sun in the semifinals, before beating the Phoenix Mercury to win the 2021 WNBA Finals.

=== Las Vegas Aces (2023) ===
In February 2023, Parker signed with the Las Vegas Aces. She underwent surgery for a foot fracture in July and was out indefinitely. Although she did not participate in the playoffs, she still captured her third championship and was awarded a ring when the Las Vegas Aces won the 2023 WNBA Finals against the New York Liberty, taking the series 3–1.

Due to the previously mentioned foot fracture, Parker's final WNBA game was played on July 7, 2023 when the Aces lost to the Dallas Wings 78 - 80. In her final game, Parker recorded 10 points, 6 rebounds, 1 assist and 1 block.

On February 7, 2024, Parker re-signed with the Aces on a one-year contract but ended up not playing any games that season.

=== Retirement ===
On April 28, 2024, Parker announced her retirement from professional basketball via her Instagram account. On May 8, 2024, Adidas declared that Parker would become the brand's president of women's basketball; she has had a long-running brand partnership with the shoe company dating back to 2008 that included a signature sneaker line.

== National team career ==
Parker was a member of the USA Women's U18 team which won the gold medal at the FIBA Americas Championship in Mayagüez, Puerto Rico. The event was held in August 2004, when the USA team defeated Puerto Rico to win the championship. Parker was the leading scorer for the team, averaging 16.6 points per game.

Parker played for Team USA in 2008, winning her first gold medal as USA beat Australia 92–65.

Parker was invited to the USA Basketball Women's National Team training camp in the fall of 2009. The team selected to play for the 2010 FIBA World Championship and the 2012 Olympics is usually chosen from these players. At the conclusion of the training camp, the team traveled to Ekaterinburg, Russia, where they competed in the 2009 UMMC Ekaterinburg International Invitational.

Parker played for Team USA at the 2012 Summer Olympics. She led the team in rebounds and blocks throughout the Olympics, helping them win another gold medal, defeating France 86–50 in the gold medal game.

Despite her performance in the previous Olympics and participation in the national team training into the summer of 2016, Parker was not selected to play for Team USA in the 2016 Summer Olympics. USA Basketball extended an invitation to Parker for the 2017–2020 national team training camp, but she declined, in light of her exclusion from the team for the Rio games.

== Overseas career ==
During each WNBA off-season from 2010 to 2015, Parker played for UMMC Ekaterinburg of the Russian League, winning five consecutive championships with the team. Parker played with teammate Kristi Toliver in her final off-season with the team. During the 2015-16 WNBA off-season, Parker signed with the Guangdong Dolphins in January 2016, to replace Yelena Leuchanka during the Women's Chinese Basketball Association (WCBA) playoffs. In February 2017, Parker signed a 2-month contract with Fenerbahçe of the Turkish Super League. In December 2017, Parker signed with the Xinjiang Magic Deer of the WCBA for the 2017–18 WNBA off-season.

== Broadcasting career ==
In 2018, Parker began serving as an analyst and commentator for Turner Sports during the 2018–19 NBA season, primarily working Tuesday night NBA games under the Players Only brand. She also served as a analyst for the 2019 NCAA Division I men's basketball tournament. In 2019, she signed a multi-year extension with Turner to continue as an analyst and commentator for the NBA on TNT's rebranded Tuesday coverage and NCAA Tournament coverage on TNT and CBS Sports, while also joining NBA TV. In 2023, she became the first woman color commentator for an NBA All-Star Game.

Parker will join Prime Video as a game and studio analyst during the 2025-26 season, while also leading the streaming service's WNBA coverage.

== Personal life ==
On May 7, 2007, People named Parker to its 100 World's Most Beautiful people list.

On November 13, 2008, Parker married Shelden Williams, who played college basketball at Duke University and also played in the NBA. The couple have a daughter, Lailaa Nicole Williams, born in 2009. In 2013, the couple purchased a 7,000-square-foot (650 m^{2}) home in Encino, Los Angeles, for $3.56 million. In November 2016, the couple split up after eight years of marriage when Williams filed for divorce, citing "irreconcilable differences".

In October 2020, Parker and her daughter became part of the ownership group of Angel City FC, a Los Angeles–based team in the National Women's Soccer League that began competing in 2022.

On December 14, 2021, Parker announced that she had married former basketball player Anna Petrakova in 2019 and that they were expecting a baby. Petrakova gave birth to a son, Airr Larry Petrakov Parker, on February 11, 2022. On December 14, 2023, Parker announced that she and Petrakova were expecting another child. Petrakova gave birth to a second son, Hartt Summitt Petrakov Parker on May 21, 2024.

Parker has a dog named Prada. She previously had a St. Bernard mix named Fendi, whom she appeared with in an anti-fur ad for PETA.

Parker is a lesbian.

== Career statistics ==
Legend
GP	Games played	GS	Games started	MPG	Minutes per game	RPG	Rebounds per game
APG	Assists per game	SPG	Steals per game	BPG	Blocks per game	PPG	Points per game
TO	Turnovers per game	FG%	Field-goal percentage	3P%	3-point field-goal percentage	FT%	Free-throw percentage
**Bold**	Career best	°	League leader

=== College ===
Year	Team	GP	Points	FG%	3P%	FT%	RPG	APG	SPG	BPG	PPG
2005–06	Tennessee	36	622	**55.2**	25.0	**72.9**	8.3	**2.8**	1.6	2.4	17.3
2006–07	Tennessee	36	706	52.9	**33.3**	71.6	**9.8**	2.4	1.8	**2.6**	19.6
2007–08	Tennessee	**38**	**809**	53.6	26.7	69.8	8.5	2.5	**2.3**	2.4	**21.3**
Career	Tennessee	110	2137	53.8	28.3	71.3	8.8	2.6	1.9	2.4	19.4

=== WNBA ===
†	Denotes seasons in which Parker won a WNBA championship

==== Regular season ====
Year	Team	GP	GS	MPG	FG%	3P%	FT%	RPG	APG	SPG	BPG	PPG
2008	Los Angeles	33	33	33.6	**.523**	**.423**	.733	9.5°	3.4	1.3	2.3	18.5
2009	Los Angeles	25	24	32.6	.485	.208	.763	9.8°	2.6	0.6	2.1	13.1
2010	Los Angeles	10	10	33.5	.500	.250	.732	**10.1**	2.2	1.0	2.2	**20.6**
2011	Los Angeles	17	16	32.6	.511	.419	.736	8.6	2.8	1.2	1.6	18.5
2012	Los Angeles	33	33	30.7	.481	.322	.710	9.7	3.3	1.5	**2.3**°	17.4
2013	Los Angeles	31	31	28.7	.493	.257	.762	8.7	3.8	1.2	1.8	17.9
2014	Los Angeles	30	29	33.2	.469	.306	.846	7.1	4.3	1.8	1.4	19.4
2015	Los Angeles	16	16	**34.4**	.489	.279	.815	**10.1**°	**6.3**°	**1.9**	1.8	19.4
2016^{†}	Los Angeles	**34**	**34**	30.8	.442	.382	.707	7.4	4.9	1.3	1.0	15.3
2017	Los Angeles	33	33	30.5	.478	.354	.756	8.4	4.3	1.4	1.7	16.9
2018	Los Angeles	31	30	30.6	.471	.345	.808	8.2	4.7	1.2	1.0	17.9
2019	Los Angeles	22	22	26.0	.422	.267	.791	6.4	3.5	1.0	0.7	11.2
2020	Los Angeles	22	22	30.0	.510	.396	.731	9.7°	4.6	1.2	1.2	14.7
2021^{†}	Chicago	23	23	26.7	.458	.329	.794	8.4	4.0	0.8	1.2	13.3
2022	Chicago	32	32	28.3	.458	.311	.816	8.6	4.5	1.0	1.2	13.2
2023^{†}	Las Vegas	18	18	23.6	.465	.333	**.893**	5.4	3.7	1.5	0.9	9.0
Career	16 years, 3 teams	410	406	30.4	.479	.333	.767	8.5	4.0	1.3	1.5	16.0

==== Playoffs ====
Year	Team	GP	GS	MPG	FG%	3P%	FT%	RPG	APG	SPG	BPG	PPG
2008	Los Angeles	6	6	36.5	.459	.000	.759	9.8°	3.8	1.5	2.2	15.0
2009	Los Angeles	6	6	35.2	.535	.250	.705	10.7°	1.7	0.8	1.8	18.0
2012	Los Angeles	4	4	36.0	**.573**	**.500**	.875	11.0°	4.3	1.0	1.8	**28.8**°
2013	Los Angeles	3	3	37.3	.542	.000	.684	8.7	1.3	1.0	1.0	25.7°
2014	Los Angeles	2	2	36.5	.543	.250	.444	6.0	3.5	1.5	2.5	21.5
2015	Los Angeles	3	3	38.3	.418	.389	.842	10.7°	4.7	2.3	1.3	23.0
2016^{†}	Los Angeles	9	9	33.0	.469	.313	.778	8.7	3.2	1.7	1.9	19.3
2017	Los Angeles	8	8	34.1	.426	.243	.895	9.1	**5.1**	**2.5**	2.0	16.9
2018	Los Angeles	2	2	30.5	.364	.250	**1.000**	7.0	3.0	**2.5**°	0.0	9.0
2019	Los Angeles	4	4	23.6	.545	.333	.333	6.0	3.5	1.0	2.0	10.5
2020	Los Angeles	1	1	**40.0**°	.462	**.500**	.900	**14.0**°	5.0	1.0	2.0	22.0
2021^{†}	Chicago	**10**	**10**	32.4	.491	.333	.895	8.4	4.4	2.1	1.0	13.8
2022	Chicago	8	8	29.4	.438	.333	.759	10.8°	4.6	1.4	**2.6**	14.8
Career	14 years, 3 teams	66	66	33.3	.481	.304	.777	9.2	3.8	1.6	1.8	17.4

== Awards ==
=== WNBA ===
- 3× WNBA champion (2016, 2021, 2023)
- WNBA Finals MVP (2016)
- 2× WNBA MVP (2008, 2013)
- 7× WNBA All-Star (2011, 2013, 2014, 2017, 2018, 2021, 2022)
- WNBA All-Star Game MVP (2013)
- 7× All-WNBA First Team (2008, 2012–2014, 2017, 2020, 2022)
- 3× All-WNBA Second Team (2009, 2015, 2018)
- 2× WNBA All-Defensive Second Team (2009, 2012)
- WNBA Rookie of the Year (2008)
- WNBA All-Rookie Team (2008)
- WNBA Defensive Player of the Year (2020)
- WNBA assists leader (2015)
- 3× WNBA rebounding leader (2008, 2009, 2020)
- 2× WNBA blocks leader (2009, 2012)
- WNBA turnovers leader (2016)
- 3× WNBA peak performer (2008, 2009, 2020)
- WNBA anniversary teams (20th, 25th)
- No. 3 retired by Los Angeles Sparks
- No. 3 retired by Chicago Sky

=== College ===
- NCAA Final Four Most Outstanding Player (2007, 2008)
- Academic All-America of the Year award (2008)
- Naismith College Player of the Year (2008)
- USBWA Women's National Player of the Year (2007, 2008)
- Associated Press Women's College Basketball Player of the Year (2008)
- Wade Trophy (2007)
- John R. Wooden Award (2007, 2008)
- Honda Sports Award, basketball (2007, 2008)
- Honda-Broderick Cup, (2007)
- SEC Athlete of the Year (2007, 2008)
- SEC Player of the Year (2007)
- SEC Tournament MVP (2006, 2007)
- SEC Freshman of the Year (2006)

=== High school ===
- All-State Team (2001-2004: AP, Chicago Sun Times, News-Gazette, Chicago Tribune, IBCA)
- Gatorade Illinois State Player of the Year (2002-2004)
- Illinois Miss Basketball (2002-2004)
- Illinois State Player of the Year (2002-2004: Chicago Tribune, Chicago Sun Times, Daily Herald, Naperville Sun, News-Gazette)
- First Team All-American (2002-2004: Nike, Parade, Street & Smith's, USA Today, 2004: McDonald's)
- Gatorade Female Basketball Player of the Year (2003-2004)
- Naismith Prep Player of the Year (2003-2004)
- USA Today High School Player of the Year (2003-2004)
- 2004 Powerade Jam Fest Winner
- 2004 Gatorade Female Athlete of the Year
- 2004 Women's Sports Foundation High School Athlete of the Year

=== USA Basketball ===
- 2004 FIBA U18 Americas Championship
- 2006 FIBA World Champions for Women Bronze Medal
- 2007 FIBA Americas Championship
- 2008 Beijing Olympics Gold Medal
- 2012 London Olympics Gold Medal

=== UMMC Ekaterinburg ===
- Championship of Russia (2010-2014)
- Cup of Russia (2010-2014)
- EuroLeague Women Champion (2013)
- EuroLeague Women Final Eight MVP (2013)
