= List of WNBA season scoring leaders =

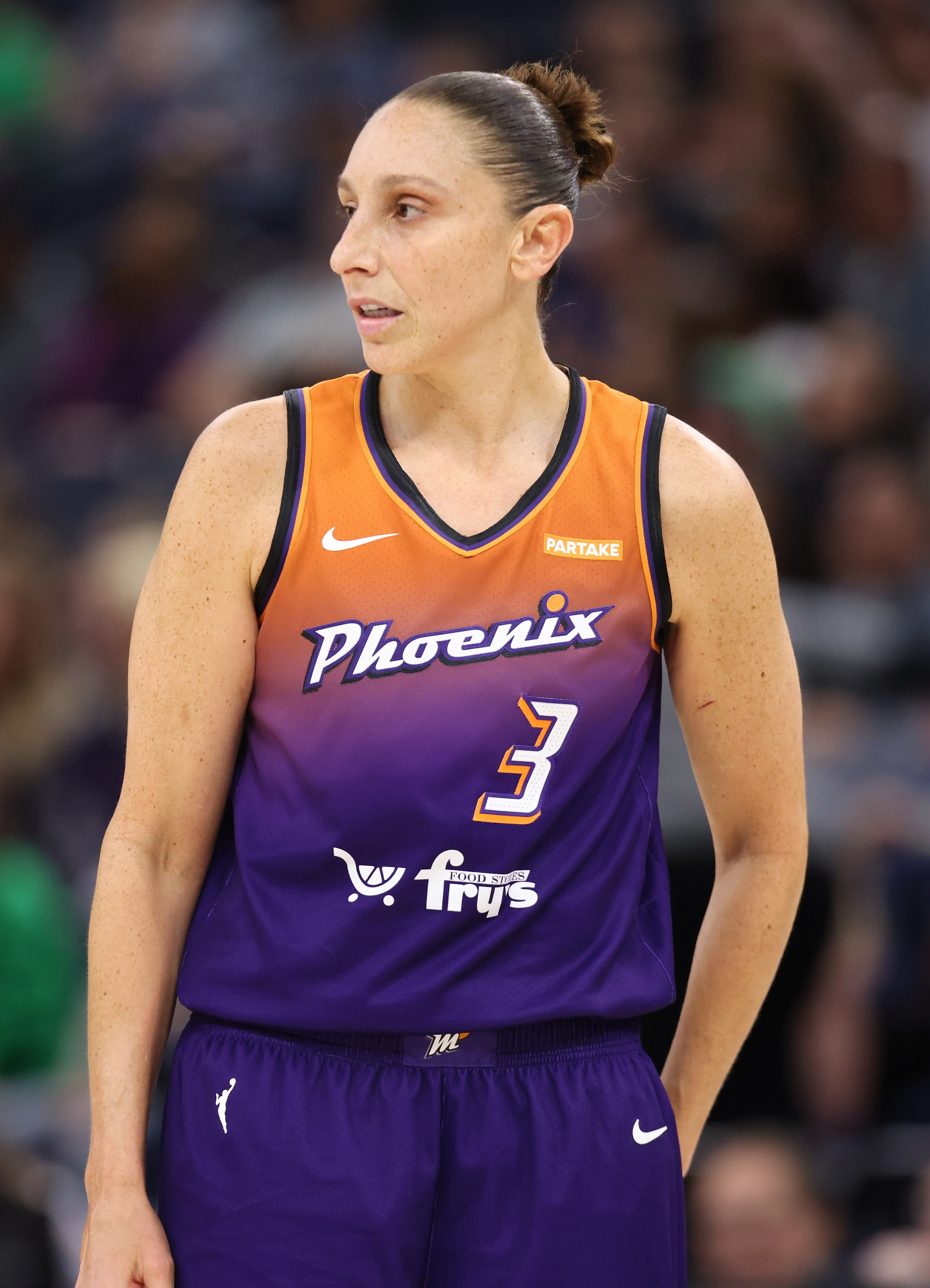
Diana Taurasi recorded 5 scoring titles in her career—the most in WNBA history.

In basketball, points are accumulated through free throws or field goals. The Women's National Basketball Association's (WNBA) scoring title is awarded to the player with the highest points per game average in every given season.

A'ja Wilson holds the all-time records for points per game (26.87) in a season; which was achieved in the 2024 season.

Diana Taurasi has won the most scoring titles, with five. Cynthia Cooper-Dyke, Lauren Jackson and A'ja Wilson have each won the scoring titles three times. Sheryl Swoopes, Angel McCoughtry, Tina Charles, and Brittney Griner have each won the scoring title twice. Taurasi also holds the record for most consecutive seasons leading the league in scoring, accomplishing this in the 2008 season, 2009 season, 2010 season, and the 2011 season. Other players that lead the league in scoring for consecutive seasons include A'ja Wilson 2024 season, 2025 season, 2025 season, Cynthia Cooper-Dyke 1997 season, 1998 season, 1999 season, and Lauren Jackson 2003 season, 2004 season. The only player to have led the league in scoring without making a three-point field goal is Brittney Griner which was accomplished in the 2017 season.

== Key ==
^		Denotes player who is still active in the WNBA			
*		Inducted into the Naismith Memorial Basketball Hall of Fame			
†		Not yet eligible for Hall of Fame consideration (Note: A player is not eligible for induction into the Naismith Memorial Basketball Hall of Fame until he has been fully retired for two calendar years.)			
‡		Denotes player who won the Most Valuable Player award that year			
Player (X)		Denotes the number of times the player had been the scoring leader up to and including that season			
G	Guard	F	Forward	C	Center

== Annual leaders ==
Season	Player	Pos (Note: The player's primary position is listed first.)	Team	GP	Field goals made	3-point field goals made	Free throws made	Total points	Points per game
1997 ‡	Cynthia Cooper*	G	Houston Comets	28	191	67	172	621	22.2
1998 ‡	Cynthia Cooper* (2)	G	Houston Comets	30	203	64	210	680	22.7
1999	Cynthia Cooper* (3)	G	Houston Comets	31	212	58	204	686	22.1
2000 ‡	Sheryl Swoopes*	F/G	Houston Comets	31	245	34	119	643	20.7
2001	Katie Smith*	G	Minnesota Lynx	32	204	85	246	739	23.1
2002	Chamique Holdsclaw*	F	Washington Mystics	20	149	11	88	397	19.9
2003 ‡	Lauren Jackson*	F/C	Seattle Storm	33	254	39	151	698	21.2
2004	Lauren Jackson* (2)	F/C	Seattle Storm	31	220	52	142	634	20.5
2005 ‡	Sheryl Swoopes* (2)	F/G	Houston Comets	33	217	27	153	614	18.6
2006	Diana Taurasi^{†}	G	Phoenix Mercury	34	298	121	143	860	25.3
2007	Lauren Jackson* (3)	F/C	Seattle Storm	31	258	49	174	739	23.8
2008	Diana Taurasi^{†} (2)	G	Phoenix Mercury	34	258	89	215	820	24.1
2009 ‡	Diana Taurasi^{†} (3)	G	Phoenix Mercury	31	200	79	152	631	20.4
2010	Diana Taurasi^{†} (4)	G	Phoenix Mercury	31	212	80	198	702	22.6
2011	Diana Taurasi^{†} (5)	G	Phoenix Mercury	32	208	81	195	692	21.6
2012	Angel McCoughtry	F/G	Atlanta Dream	24	177	28	132	514	21.4
2013	Angel McCoughtry (2)	F/G	Atlanta Dream	33	246	23	196	711	21.5
2014 ‡	Maya Moore*	F	Minnesota Lynx	34	295	62	160	812	23.9
2015 ‡	Elena Delle Donne*	F/G	Chicago Sky	31	238	42	207	725	23.4
2016	Tina Charles†	C	New York Liberty	32	273	17	125	688	21.5
2017	Brittney Griner^	C	Phoenix Mercury	26	207	0	155	569	21.9
2018	Liz Cambage	C	Dallas Wings	32	278	12	169	737	23.0
2019	Brittney Griner^ (2)	C	Phoenix Mercury	31	270	1	101	642	20.7
2020	Arike Ogunbowale^	G	Dallas Wings	22	173	48	107	501	22.8
2021	Tina Charles† (2)	C	Washington Mystics	27	238	50	105	631	23.4
2022	Breanna Stewart^	F	Seattle Storm	34	255	67	164	741	21.8
2023	Jewell Loyd^	G	Seattle Storm	38	285	115	254	939	24.7
2024 ‡	A'ja Wilson^	C	Las Vegas Aces	38	385	19	232	1,021	26.9
2025 ‡	A'ja Wilson^ (2)	C	Las Vegas Aces	40	332	25	248	937	23.4
2026 ‡	A'ja Wilson^ (3)	C	Las Vegas Aces	41	379	36	279	1,073	26.2

== Multiple-time leaders ==
Rank	Player	Team	Times leader	Years
1	Diana Taurasi	Phoenix Mercury	5	2006, 2008, 2009, 2010, 2011
2	Cynthia Cooper	Houston Comets	3	1997, 1998, 1999
2	Lauren Jackson	Seattle Storm	3	2003, 2004, 2007
2	A'ja Wilson	Las Vegas Aces	3	2024, 2025, 2026
3	Sheryl Swoopes	Houston Comets	2	2000, 2005
3	Angel McCoughtry	Atlanta Dream	2	2012, 2013
3	Tina Charles	New York Liberty (1) / Washington Mystics (1)	2	2016, 2021
3	Brittney Griner	Phoenix Mercury	2	2017, 2019

== See also ==
- WNBA Peak Performers
