= Honda Sports Award (basketball) =

The Honda Sports Award for basketball is presented annually to the best women's college basketball player, as selected by a panel of more than 1,000 NCAA administrators. The award was first presented following the 1976–77 season. Four nominees are chosen annually by a panel of coaches representing the Women's Basketball Coaches Association (WBCA), and the winner is chosen by the votes of administrators from every NCAA member institution, with each institution having one vote.

== Winners ==
Thirty-one women's college basketball players have received the Honda Sports Award for basketball in the 42 seasons it has been presented. Ten players have won the award multiple times. Breanna Stewart of UConn is the only three-time winner; nine others have won the award twice: Nancy Lieberman of Old Dominion, Cheryl Miller of USC, Dawn Staley of Virginia, Chamique Holdsclaw of Tennessee, Diana Taurasi of UConn, Seimone Augustus of LSU, Candace Parker of Tennessee, Maya Moore of UConn, and Caitlin Clark of Iowa.

Player (X)	Denotes the number of times the player has been awarded the Honda Sports Award at that point

Season	Player	School	Position	Class
1976–77	Lucy Harris	Delta State	C	Senior
1977–78	Ann Meyers	UCLA	G	Senior
1978–79	Nancy Lieberman	Old Dominion	G	Junior
1979–80	Nancy Lieberman (2)	Old Dominion	G	Senior
1980–81	Lynette Woodard	Kansas	G	Senior
1981–82	Pam Kelly	Louisiana Tech	C	Senior
1982–83	Anne Donovan	Old Dominion	C	Senior
1983–84	Cheryl Miller	USC	F	Sophomore
1984–85	Cheryl Miller (2)	USC	F	Junior
1985–86	Kamie Ethridge	Texas	G	Senior
1986–87	Katrina McClain	Georgia	F	Senior
1987–88	Teresa Weatherspoon	Louisiana Tech	G	Senior
1988–89	Bridgette Gordon	Tennessee	C	Senior
1989–90	Jennifer Azzi	Stanford	G	Senior
1990–91	Dawn Staley	Virginia	G	Junior
1991–92	Dawn Staley (2)	Virginia	G	Senior
1992–93	Sheryl Swoopes	Texas Tech	G/F	Senior
1993–94	Lisa Leslie	USC	C	Senior
1994–95	Rebecca Lobo	Connecticut (Note: Officially known for sports purposes as "UConn" since 2013–14.)	C	Senior
1995–96	Jennifer Rizzotti	Connecticut	G	Senior
1996–97	DeLisha Milton	Florida	F	Senior
1997–98	Chamique Holdsclaw	Tennessee	F	Sophomore
1998–99	Chamique Holdsclaw (2)	Tennessee	F	Junior
1998–99	Stephanie White-McCarty	Purdue	G	Senior
1999–00	Shea Ralph	Connecticut	G	Junior
2000–01	Jackie Stiles	Southwest Missouri State (Note: Known as Missouri State since 2005.)	G	Senior
2001–02	Sue Bird	Connecticut	G	Senior
2002–03	Diana Taurasi	Connecticut	F	Junior
2003–04	Diana Taurasi (2)	Connecticut	F	Senior
2004–05	Seimone Augustus	LSU	G	Junior
2005–06	Seimone Augustus (2)	LSU	G	Senior
2006–07	Candace Parker	Tennessee	C	Junior
2007–08	Candace Parker (2)	Tennessee	C	Senior
2008–09	Renee Montgomery	Connecticut	G	Senior
2009–10	Maya Moore	Connecticut	F	Junior
2010–11	Maya Moore (2)	Connecticut	F	Senior
2011–12	Brittney Griner	Baylor	C	Junior
2012–13	Elena Delle Donne	Delaware	G/F	Senior
2013–14	Breanna Stewart	UConn	F	Sophomore
2014–15	Breanna Stewart (2)	UConn	F	Junior
2015–16	Breanna Stewart (3)	UConn	F	Senior
2016–17	Kelsey Plum	Washington	G	Senior
2017–18	A'ja Wilson	South Carolina	F	Senior
2018–19	Megan Gustafson	Iowa	C	Senior
2019–20	Sabrina Ionescu	Oregon	G	Senior
2020–21	NaLyssa Smith	Baylor	F	Junior
2021–22	Aliyah Boston	South Carolina	C	Junior
2022–23	Caitlin Clark	Iowa	G	Junior
2023–24	Caitlin Clark (2)	Iowa	G	Senior
2024–25	Paige Bueckers	UConn	G	Senior
2025–26	Lauren Betts	UCLA	C	Senior

== Totals by school ==
The following is a list of all schools with players having received the Honda Sports Award in basketball, the total number of awards per school, the number of individual players awarded per school, and the years in which the awards were received.

School	Total awards	Individual recipients	Years
UConn	13	9	1995, 1996, 2000, 2002, 2003, 2004, 2009, 2010, 2011, 2014, 2015, 2016, 2025
Tennessee	5	3	1989, 1998, 1999, 2007, 2008
Old Dominion	3	2	1979, 1980, 1983
USC	3	2	1984, 1985, 1994
Iowa	3	2	2019, 2023, 2024
Baylor	2	2	2012, 2021
Louisiana Tech	2	2	1982, 1988
South Carolina	2	2	2018, 2022
UCLA	2	2	1978, 2026
LSU	2	1	2005, 2006
Virginia	2	1	1991, 1992
Delaware	1	1	2013
Delta State	1	1	1977
Florida	1	1	1997
Georgia	1	1	1987
Kansas	1	1	1981
Oregon	1	1	2020
Purdue	1	1	1999
Missouri State	1	1	2001
Stanford	1	1	1990
Texas	1	1	1986
Texas Tech	1	1	1993
Washington	1	1	2017

== See also ==
- List of sports awards honoring women
