= Cynthia Cooper-Dyke =

American basketball player and coach (born 1963)

Cynthia Cooper
- Cooper-Dyke in 2026

Personal information
- Born: April 14, 1963 (age 63) Chicago, Illinois, U.S.
- Listed height: 5 ft 10 in (1.78 m)
- Listed weight: 150 lb (68 kg)

Career information
- High school: Locke (Los Angeles, California)
- College: USC (1982–1986)
- Playing career: 1986–2003
- Position: Point guard / shooting guard
- Number: 14
- Coaching career: 2001–2022

Career history

Playing
- 1986–1987: Bétera - Valencian Region / Spain
- 1987–1994: Basket Parma
- 1994–1996: SC Alcamo
- 1997–2000, 2003: Houston Comets

Coaching
- 2001–2002: Phoenix Mercury
- 2005–2010: Prairie View A&M
- 2010–2012: UNC Wilmington
- 2012–2013: Texas Southern
- 2013–2017: USC
- 2019–2022: Texas Southern

Career highlights
- As player: 4× WNBA champion (1997–2000); 4× WNBA Finals MVP (1997–2000); 2× WNBA MVP (1997, 1998); 3× WNBA All-Star (1999, 2000, 2003); 4× All-WNBA First Team (1997–2000); 3× WNBA scoring champion (1997–1999); WNBA anniversary teams (10th, 15th, 20th, 25th); 2× NCAA champion (1983, 1984); State of California Division 4A Girls High School Basketball Champion | Locke High School (1981); No. 14 retired by Houston Comets; No. 44 retired by USC Trojans; As coach: 2× SWAC Coach of the Year (2007, 2009); CAA Coach of the Year (2011)

Career WNBA statistics
- Points: 2,601 (21.0 ppg)
- Rebounds: 403 (3.3 rpg)
- Assists: 602 (4.9 apg)
- Stats at WNBA.com
- Stats at Basketball Reference
- Basketball Hall of Fame
- Women's Basketball Hall of Fame
Medals
Women's basketball
Representing the United States
Olympic Games
Gold medal – first place	1988 Seoul	Team competition
Bronze medal – third place	1992 Barcelona	Team competition
Pan American Games
Gold medal – first place	1987 Indianapolis	Team competition
FIBA World Championship
Gold medal – first place	1986 Moscow	Team competition
Gold medal – first place	1990 Malaysia	Team competition
Jones Cup
Silver medal – second place	1981 Taipei	Team competition
Assistant coach for United States
FIBA Under-19 World Championship
Gold medal – first place	2007 Bratislava	Team competition

Cynthia Lynne Cooper-Dyke (born April 14, 1963) is an American basketball coach and former player who has won championships at every level of competition: in high school, at Locke High School in Los Angeles, California; in college, at USC; in the Olympics; and in the Women's National Basketball Association (WNBA). She is considered to be one of the greatest female basketball players ever. Upon the WNBA's formation, she played for the Houston Comets from 1997 to 2000, being named the Most Valuable Player of the WNBA Finals in four straight seasons.

Cooper served as the coach of the Phoenix Mercury in the WNBA from 2001 to 2002. In the NCAA, she was college coach for UNC Wilmington, Prairie View A&M, Texas Southern, and USC between 2005 and 2022.

Cooper-Dyke was inducted into the Women's Basketball Hall of Fame in 2009 and the Naismith Memorial Basketball Hall of Fame in 2010. She has been member of every WNBA Anniversary Team (10th, 15th, 20th, and 25th) since their creation. In 2011, Cooper was voted by fans as one of the top 15 players in WNBA history.

== Early years ==
=== High school ===
Cooper attended Locke High School before enrolling at the University of Southern California. Cooper participated athletically in both track and field as well as basketball. She led her team to the California State Championship (4A) scoring an average of 31 points per game, and scoring 44 points in one game. Cooper was named the Los Angeles Player of the Year.

=== College ===
Cooper was a four-year letter winner at guard for USC from 1982 to 1986. She led the Women of Troy to NCAA appearances in all four years, Final Four appearances in three of her four years, and back-to-back NCAA tournament titles in 1983 and 1984. After the 1984 Championship, she briefly left school, but was persuaded to return. She completed four years with USC, although she did not graduate. Cooper closed out her collegiate career with an appearance in the 1986 NCAA tournament championship game and a spot on the NCAA Final Four All-Tournament Team. Cooper ranks eighth on USC's all-time scoring list with 1,559 points, fifth in assists (381) and third in steals (256). While Cooper was at USC, the Women of Troy compiled a record of 114–15. She earned her bachelor's degree from Prairie View A&M University in 2005.

=== USC statistics ===
Legend
GP	Games played	GS	Games started	MPG	Minutes per game
FG%	Field goal percentage	3P%	3-point field goal percentage	FT%	Free throw percentage
RPG	Rebounds per game	APG	Assists per game	SPG	Steals per game
BPG	Blocks per game	PPG	Points per game	**Bold**	Career high

Year	Team	GP	Points	FG%	FT%	RPG	APG	PPG
1982–83	USC	25	351	48.5%	67.0%	3.6	NA	14.0
1983–84	USC	33	313	47.0%	50.8%	4.1	NA	9.5
1984–85	USC	25	233	46.6%	64.6%	3.5	NA	9.3
1985–86	USC	**36**	**620**	**50.6%**	**74.8%**	**4.6**	**2.9**	**17.2**
Career		119	1517	48.7%	66.4%	4.0	0.9	12.7

== Career ==
=== Team USA ===
Cooper was named to represent the US at the 1981 William Jones Cup competition in Taipei, Taiwan, while still in high school. The team won seven of eight games to win the silver medal for the event. Cooper scored 2.8 points per game and recorded nine steals.

Cooper was selected to represent the US at the inaugural Goodwill games, held in Moscow in July 1986. North Carolina State's Kay Yow served as head coach. The team opened up with a 72–53 win over Yugoslavia and followed that with a 21-point win over Brazil 91–70. The third game was against Czechoslovakia and would be much closer. Cheryl Miller was the scoring leader in this game, scoring 26 points to help the US to a 78–70 victory. The US faced Bulgaria in the semi-final match up, and again won, this time 67–58. This set up the final against the Soviet Union, led by 7-foot-2 Ivilana Semenova, considered the most dominant player in the world. The Soviet team had a 152–2 record in major international competition over the prior three decades, including an 84–82 win over the US in the 1983 World Championships. The Soviets held the early edge, leading 21–19 at one time, before the US went on a scoring run to take a large lead they did not relinquish. The final score was 83–60 in favor of the US, earning the gold medal for the US squad. Cooper averaged 2.0 points per game.

Cooper continued to represent the US with the national team at the 1986 World Championship, held in Moscow, a month after the Goodwill Games in Moscow. The US team was even more dominant this time. The early games were won easily, and the semifinal against Canada, while the closest game for the US so far, ended up an 82–59 victory. At the same time, the Soviet team was winning easily as well, and the final game pitted two teams each with 6–0 records. The Soviet team, having lost only once at home, wanted to show that the Goodwill games setback was a fluke. The US team started by scoring the first eight points, and raced to a 45–23 lead, although the Soviets fought back and reduced the halftime margin to 13. The US went on a 15–1 run in the second half to put the game away and ended up winning the gold medal with a score of 108–88. Cooper averaged 5.9 points per game.

Cooper played for USA Basketball as part of the 1987 USA Women's Pan American Team which won a gold medal in Indianapolis, Indiana. Cooper was a member of the gold medalist 1988 US Olympic Women's Basketball Team., and the Bronze Medal team in 1992.

=== International ===
Cooper played for several teams in the European leagues:

- Samoa Bétera (Spain) 1986–1987 (36.7 ppg)
- Parma (Italy) 1987–1994
- Alcamo (Italy) 1994–1996

During her time playing for Samoa Bétera, a Spanish team, she was the league leading scorer with 36.7 ppg. During the almost ten years she played in the Italian leagues, she was the league's leading scorer eight times and finished second the other two years.

In 1987, she was the MVP of the European All-Star team. She was also named to the All-Star team of the Italian leagues in 1996–1997.

=== WNBA ===
At the age of 34, Cooper signed to play with the Houston Comets. Cooper has the distinction of scoring the most points out of all players who participated in the first day of the WNBA's conception. On June 21, 1997, 58 women across 6 teams suited up to kick off the WNBA's first scheduled day of competition. On that day, the Comets earned a 76–56 win over the Cleveland Rockers where Cooper recorded 25 points, 8 rebounds, 5 assists, 3 steals and 1 block. She was the only player that day to score 20+ points, thus making her the first player in WNBA history to have a 20-point game.

She led the league in scoring three consecutive years, leading the franchise to a record four WNBA Championships. In addition, she was voted the WNBA's MVP in 1997 and 1998 and named Most Valuable Player in each of those four WNBA Finals. On July 25, 1997, Cooper set the record for the most points scored by a first-year player when she scored 44 points against the Sacramento Monarchs. This record still stands 28 years later but it was tied by Dallas Wings rookie Paige Bueckers on August 20, 2025, when Bueckers recorded 44 points in an 80–81 loss to the Los Angeles Sparks. Many sources cite Bueckers as the "official" record holder for most points scored in a game by a rookie. This is because when Cooper set the record in 1997, it was the WNBA's inaugural season, so every player in the league was technically a "rookie" and many players (including Cooper) already had professional basketball experience from playing in other leagues.

Cooper was named the 1998 Sportswoman of the Year (in the team category) by the Women's Sports Foundation. During the Comet dynasty, she was a vital part of the triple threat offense with Sheryl Swoopes and Tina Thompson. When retired in 2000, Cooper became the first player in WNBA history to score 500, 1,000, 2,000 and 2,500 career points. She scored 30 or more points in 16 of her 120 games and had a 92-game double-figure scoring streak from 1997 to 2000. She went on to coach the Phoenix Mercury for one and a half seasons (2001–2002).

Cooper returned as an active player in the 2003 season and played only 4 games during that season with the Comets. Her appearance in the game on May 22, 2003, as a 40-year-old, made her the oldest player, at the time, to play in a WNBA game (later being broken by Nancy Lieberman-Cline who at 50 years old, played a game for the Detroit Shock on July 24, 2008).

Cooper's final WNBA game ever was played on June 1, 2003, in a 68–64 loss to the Minnesota Lynx with Cooper recording 22 points, 3 rebounds, 4 assists and 2 steals.

Afterward, she served as a TV analyst and halftime reporter for the Houston Rockets of the NBA. Cooper has also been named one of the top 15 players in the WNBA at the 2011 WNBA All-Star game. During Game 1 of the 2016 WNBA Finals, she was named in the WNBA Top 20@20.

==== Career statistics ====
Legend
GP	Games played	GS	Games started	MPG	Minutes per game	RPG	Rebounds per game
APG	Assists per game	SPG	Steals per game	BPG	Blocks per game	PPG	Points per game
TO	Turnovers per game	FG%	Field-goal percentage	3P%	3-point field-goal percentage	FT%	Free-throw percentage
**Bold**	Career best	°	League leader

†	Denotes seasons in which Cooper won a WNBA championship
‡	WNBA record

===== Regular season =====
Year	Team	GP	GS	MPG	FG%	3P%	FT%	RPG	APG	SPG	BPG	TO	PPG
1997^{†}	Houston	28	28	35.1	**.470**	**.414**	.864	**4.0**	4.7	**2.1**	0.2	3.89	22.2°
1998^{†}	Houston	30	30	35.0	.446	.400	.854	3.7	4.4	1.6	**0.4**	**3.17**	**22.7**°
1999^{†}	Houston	**31**	**31**	35.5	.463	.335	.891	2.8	5.2	1.4	**0.4**	3.35	22.1°
2000^{†}	Houston	**31**	**31**	35.0	.459	.355	.875	2.7	5.0	1.3	0.2	3.19	17.7
2003	Houston	4	4	**36.0**	.421	.389	**.893**	2.5	**5.5**	1.0	0.3	3.50	16.0
Career	5 years, 1 team	124	124	35.2‡	.459	.377	.871	3.2	4.9	1.6	0.3	3.40	21.0‡

===== Playoffs =====
Year	Team	GP	GS	MPG	FG%	3P%	FT%	RPG	APG	SPG	BPG	TO	PPG
1997^{†}	Houston	2	2	38.5	**.533**	**.400**	.741	**4.5**	4.5	1.5	0.5	3.50	**28.0**°
1998^{†}	Houston	5	5	**39.6**°	.452	.250	.844	3.2	4.4	**1.8**	**1.0**	**3.00**	25.8°
1999^{†}	Houston	**6**	**6**	36.7	.388	.324	.865	4.3	**6.8**	1.5	**1.0**	3.33	20.3
2000^{†}	Houston	**6**	**6**	38.0	.378	.344	**.897**	2.5	3.7	1.5	0.2	**3.00**	22.8°
Career	4 years, 1 team	19	19	38.1	.416	.317	.847	3.5	4.9	1.6	0.7	3.16	23.3‡

== College coaching career ==
As a collegiate head coach, Cynthia Cooper-Dyke won 7 total NCAA conference championships. This includes 4 regular season titles and 3 conference tournament titles. Her championship breakdown by school features: Prairie View A&M (SWAC)3 Regular Season Championships: 2007, 2008, 2009 2 Tournament Championships: 2007, 2009 Texas Southern (SWAC)1 Regular Season Championship: 2013 USC (Pac-12)1 Tournament Championship: 2014

=== Prairie View A&M (2005–2010) ===
In May 2005, Cooper was named the head coach of the women's basketball team at Prairie View A&M University. In her second season in 2006–07, Cooper-Dyke led the underdog Panthers to their first SWAC women's basketball tournament title and NCAA tournament appearance. Cooper-Dyke was named SWAC Coach of the Year for 2007.

In January 2008, the NCAA penalized Prairie View for NCAA rules violations committed by Cooper, reducing the number of scholarships for the team. The school was placed on four years' probation for "major violations" in 2005–2006 that ranged from Cooper giving players small amounts of cash to various forms of unauthorized practices. Cooper also gave players free tickets to Comets game, which is another NCAA infraction.

In five seasons at Prairie View, Cooper-Dyke had a cumulative 86–72 record.

=== UNC Wilmington (2010–2012) ===
On May 10, 2010, Cooper-Dyke was announced as the next head coach of the UNC Wilmington Seahawks Women's Basketball team. In Cooper-Dyke's first season, UNCW achieved an historic high in wins with a 24–9 record and appeared in the 2011 Women's National Invitation Tournament. Cooper-Dyke was the 2011 Colonial Athletic Association Coach of the Year, her third conference yearly honor of that sort.

=== First stint at Texas Southern (2012–2013) ===
On April 10, 2012, Cooper resigned from UNCW and became the head coach at Texas Southern. The 2012–13 Texas Southern team went 20–12 and appeared in the 2013 Women's National Invitation Tournament.

=== USC (2013–2017) ===
On April 11, 2013. Cooper returned to USC as head coach. In her first season, Cooper-Dyke led USC to a 22–13 (11–7 Pac-12) season with an appearance in the 2014 NCAA Division I women's basketball tournament. On March 3, 2017, Cooper-Dyke resigned as head coach at USC, following a 14–16 season in 2016–17 and 70–56 overall record.

=== Second stint at Texas Southern (2019–2022) ===
In April 2019, she returned to coach at Texas Southern. Texas Southern had a 20–10 record in her first season back but had two straight losing seasons afterwards at 5–10 and 11–15. Cooper-Dyke retired on March 17, 2022. She concluded her four seasons in two stints with a cumulative 56–47 record.

The Athletic reported on May 5, 2022, that Texas Southern opened a Title IX investigation into Cooper-Dyke over accusations of sexual harassment and verbal abuse. A hearing had been scheduled for April 6 but was canceled due to Cooper-Dyke no longer being employed by the university. Additional allegations of similar misconduct were revealed from her previous coaching jobs at UNC Wilmington and USC.

== Halls of Fame ==
Cooper was inducted into the Women's Basketball Hall of Fame in 2009. She was also announced as a member of the 2010 induction class of the Naismith Memorial Basketball Hall of Fame (the first WNBA player to be inducted) and was formally inducted on August 13 of that year.

== Personal life ==
Although born in Chicago, Illinois, Cooper-Dyke grew up in South Central Los Angeles, California. Cooper-Dyke is the daughter of Mary and Kenny Cooper. Her father left the family when she was only six years old, leaving her mother to raise eight children. Cooper-Dyke attended the University of Southern California and played on their women's basketball team for four years, winning NCAA championships in 1983 and 1984 with star teammate Cheryl Miller, but left in 1986 before earning a degree. She played on international women's basketball teams in Spain and Italy for a decade before returning to the US to play for the Houston Comets. While abroad she learned to speak Italian fluently.

In 2000, she published her autobiography, entitled She Got Game: My Personal Odyssey, which covered her childhood, her basketball career up to that time, and her mother's battle with breast cancer.

Her first marriage was on July 30, 1993, to Anthony Stewart in San Antonio, Texas. On April 28, 2001, she married Brian Dyke. She acted as a surrogate mother to seven of her nieces and nephews and adopted her younger sister Lisa's son. She is a mother to twins – a son, Brian Jr., and a daughter, Cyan, born June 15, 2002.

== Head coaching record ==
=== WNBA ===
Legend
Regular season	G	Games coached	W	Games won	L	Games lost	W–L %	Win–loss %
Playoffs	PG	Playoff games	PW	Playoff wins	PL	Playoff losses	PW–L %	Playoff win–loss %

Team	Year	G	W	L	W–L%	Finish	PG	PW	PL	PW–L%	Result
Phoenix	2001	32	13	19	.406	5th	—	—	—	—	—
Phoenix	2002	10	6	4	.600	(resigned)	—	—	—	—	—
Career		42	19	23	.452		—	—	—	—	

=== College ===
Record table
Season	Team	Overall	Conference	Standing	Postseason
Prairie View A&M Panthers (Southwestern Athletic Conference) (2005–2010)
2005–06	Prairie View A&M	7–21	6–12	T–8th	
2006–07	Prairie View A&M	19–14	14–4	T–1st	NCAA first round
2007–08	Prairie View A&M	22–12	15–3	1st	WNIT First Round
2008–09	Prairie View A&M	23–11	17–1	1st	NCAA first round
2009–10	Prairie View A&M	15–14	12–6	2nd	WNIT First Round
Prairie View A&M:		86–72 (.544)	64–26 (.711)		
UNC Wilmington Seahawks (Colonial Athletic Association) (2010–2012)
2010–11	UNC Wilmington	24–9	14–4	T–2nd	WNIT Second Round
2011–12	UNC Wilmington	20–13	11–7	T–4th	WNIT First Round
UNCW:		44–22 (.667)	25–11 (.694)		
Texas Southern Tigers (Southwestern Athletic Conference) (2012–2013)
2012–13	Texas Southern	20–13	16–2	1st	WNIT First Round
Texas Southern (first):		20–13 (.606)	16–2 (.889)		
USC Trojans (Pac-12 Conference) (2013–2017)
2013–14	USC	22–13	11–7	T–4th	NCAA first round
2014–15	USC	15–15	7–11	T–7th	
2015–16	USC	19–13	6–12	8th	
2016–17	USC	14–16	5–13	T–9th	
USC:		70–57 (.551)	29–43 (.403)		
Texas Southern Tigers (Southwestern Athletic Conference) (2019–2022)
2019–20	Texas Southern	20–10	14–4	2nd	
2020–21	Texas Southern	5–10	4–8	7th	
2021–22	Texas Southern	11–15	11–7	T–4th	
Texas Southern (second):		36–45 (.444)	29–19 (.604)		
Total:		256–198 (.564)			
National champion Postseason invitational champion Conference regular season champion Conference regular season and conference tournament champion Division regular season champion Division regular season and conference tournament champion Conference tournament champion

== Awards and achievements ==
- 2x Ronchetti Cup (1990, 1993)
- 2× WNBA MVP (1997, 1998)
- 3× WNBA All-Star (1999, 2000, 2003)
- 4× All-WNBA First Team (1997–2000)
- 4× WNBA Champion (1997, 1998, 1999, 2000)
- 4× WNBA Finals MVP (1997, 1998, 1999, 2000)
- 3× WNBA scoring champion (1997–1999)
- WNBA anniversary teams (10th, 15th, 20th, 25th)
- WNBA Hall of Fame (2009)
- Women's Basketball Hall of Fame (2009)
- Basketball Hall of Fame (2010)
- CAA Coach of the Year (2010)
- WBCBL Professional Basketball Trailblazer Award (2015)
