= WNBA Defensive Player of the Year =

Annual basketball award

The Women's National Basketball Association's Defensive Player of the Year Award is an annual Women's National Basketball Association (WNBA) award given since the league's inaugural season in 1997, to the top defensive player of the regular season. The winner is selected by a panel of sportswriters and broadcasters throughout the United States, each of whom casts a vote for first, second, and third place selections. Each first-place vote is worth five points; each second-place vote is worth three points; and each third-place vote is worth one point. The player with the highest point total, regardless of the number of first-place votes, wins the award.

Tamika Catchings has won the defensive player of the year award more times than any other player, with a record of five.

== Winners ==
	Denotes player who is still active in the WNBA
	Inducted into the Women's Basketball Hall of Fame
	Inducted into the Naismith Memorial Basketball Hall of Fame
	Denotes player whose team won championship that year
Player (X)	Denotes the number of times the player has won
Team (X)	Denotes the number of times a player from this team has won

Season	Player	Position	Nationality	Team	First-Place Votes	Ref.
1997	Teresa Weatherspoon	Guard	United States	New York Liberty	22 out of 37	
1998	Teresa Weatherspoon (2)	Guard	United States	New York Liberty (2)	28 out of 45	
1999	Yolanda Griffith	Center	United States	Sacramento Monarchs	17 out of 51	
2000	Sheryl Swoopes	Guard / Forward	United States	Houston Comets	33 out of 62	
2001	Debbie Black	Guard	United States	Miami Sol	22 out of 60	
2002	Sheryl Swoopes (2)	Guard / Forward	United States	Houston Comets (2)	22 out of 60	
2003	Sheryl Swoopes (3)	Guard / Forward	United States	Houston Comets (3)	35 out of 54	
2004	Lisa Leslie	Center	United States	Los Angeles Sparks	27 out of 46	
2005	Tamika Catchings	Forward	United States	Indiana Fever	35 out of 50	
2006	Tamika Catchings (2)	Forward	United States	Indiana Fever (2)	43 out of 56	
2007	Lauren Jackson	Forward / Center	Australia	Seattle Storm	20 out of 48	
2008	Lisa Leslie (2)	Center	United States	Los Angeles Sparks (2)	20 out of 43	
2009	Tamika Catchings (3)	Forward	United States	Indiana Fever (3)	34 out of 40	
2010	Tamika Catchings (4)	Forward	United States	Indiana Fever (4)	30 out of 39	
2011	Sylvia Fowles	Center	United States	Chicago Sky	19 out of 40	
2012	Tamika Catchings (5)	Forward	United States	Indiana Fever (5)	19 out of 41	
2013	Sylvia Fowles (2)	Center	United States	Chicago Sky (2)	21 out of 39	
2014	Brittney Griner	Center	United States	Phoenix Mercury	31 out of 38	
2015	Brittney Griner (2)	Center	United States	Phoenix Mercury (2)	33 out of 39	
2016	Sylvia Fowles (3)	Center	United States	Minnesota Lynx	19 out of 39	
2017	Alana Beard	Guard / Forward	United States	Los Angeles Sparks (3)	28 out of 40	
2018	Alana Beard (2)	Guard / Forward	United States	Los Angeles Sparks (4)	16 out of 39	
2019	Natasha Howard	Guard / Forward	United States	Seattle Storm (2)	33 out of 43	
2020	Candace Parker	Forward / Center	United States	Los Angeles Sparks (5)	16 out of 47	
2021	Sylvia Fowles (4)	Center	United States	Minnesota Lynx (2)	31 out of 49	
2022	A'ja Wilson	Forward	United States	Las Vegas Aces	20 out of 56	
2023	A'ja Wilson (2)	Forward	United States	Las Vegas Aces (2)	32 out of 60	
2024	Napheesa Collier	Forward	United States	Minnesota Lynx (3)	36 out of 60	
2025	Alanna Smith	Forward	Australia	Minnesota Lynx (4)	29 out of 72	
2025	A'ja Wilson (3)	Center	United States	Las Vegas Aces (3)	29 out of 72	
2026	Angel Reese	Forward	United States	Atlanta Dream	46 out of 74	

== Multi-time winners ==
Awards	Player	Team(s)	Years
5	Tamika Catchings	Indiana Fever	2005, 2006, 2009, 2010, 2012
4	Sylvia Fowles	Chicago Sky / Minnesota Lynx	2011, 2013, 2016, 2021
3	Sheryl Swoopes	Houston Comets	2000, 2002, 2003
3	A'ja Wilson	Las Vegas Aces	2022, 2023, 2025
2	Teresa Weatherspoon	New York Liberty	1997, 1998
2	Lisa Leslie	Los Angeles Sparks	2004, 2008
2	Brittney Griner	Phoenix Mercury	2014, 2015
2	Alana Beard	Los Angeles Sparks	2017, 2018

== See also ==
- List of sports awards honoring women
