= WNBA Finals Most Valuable Player =

Basketball award

The Women's National Basketball Association Finals Most Valuable Player (MVP) is an annual Women's National Basketball Association (WNBA) award given since the league's inaugural season.

During the first four years of the league, the Houston Comets' Cynthia Cooper won the award four consecutive times. The Los Angeles Sparks' Lisa Leslie won back-to-back in the subsequent two seasons. No other players have won the award in consecutive seasons, but Diana Taurasi, Sylvia Fowles, Breanna Stewart, and A'ja Wilson have won the award twice. While some teams have won multiple championship since the dynasty years of the Comets and the Sparks, the match-up usually resulted in different MVPs. For example, in the Detroit Shock's three wins over six years, three different players won the award. As of 2026, there have been four non-American Finals MVPs – Lauren Jackson of Australia (2010), Emma Meesseman of Belgium (2019), Jonquel Jones, a Bahamian who has represented Bosnia and Herzegovina internationally (2024) and Gabby Williams of France (2026).

== Winners ==
	Denotes player who is still active in the WNBA
	Inducted into the Women's Basketball Hall of Fame
	Inducted into the Naismith Memorial Basketball Hall of Fame
Player (X)	Denotes the number of times the player has won
Team (X)	Denotes the number of times a player from this team has won

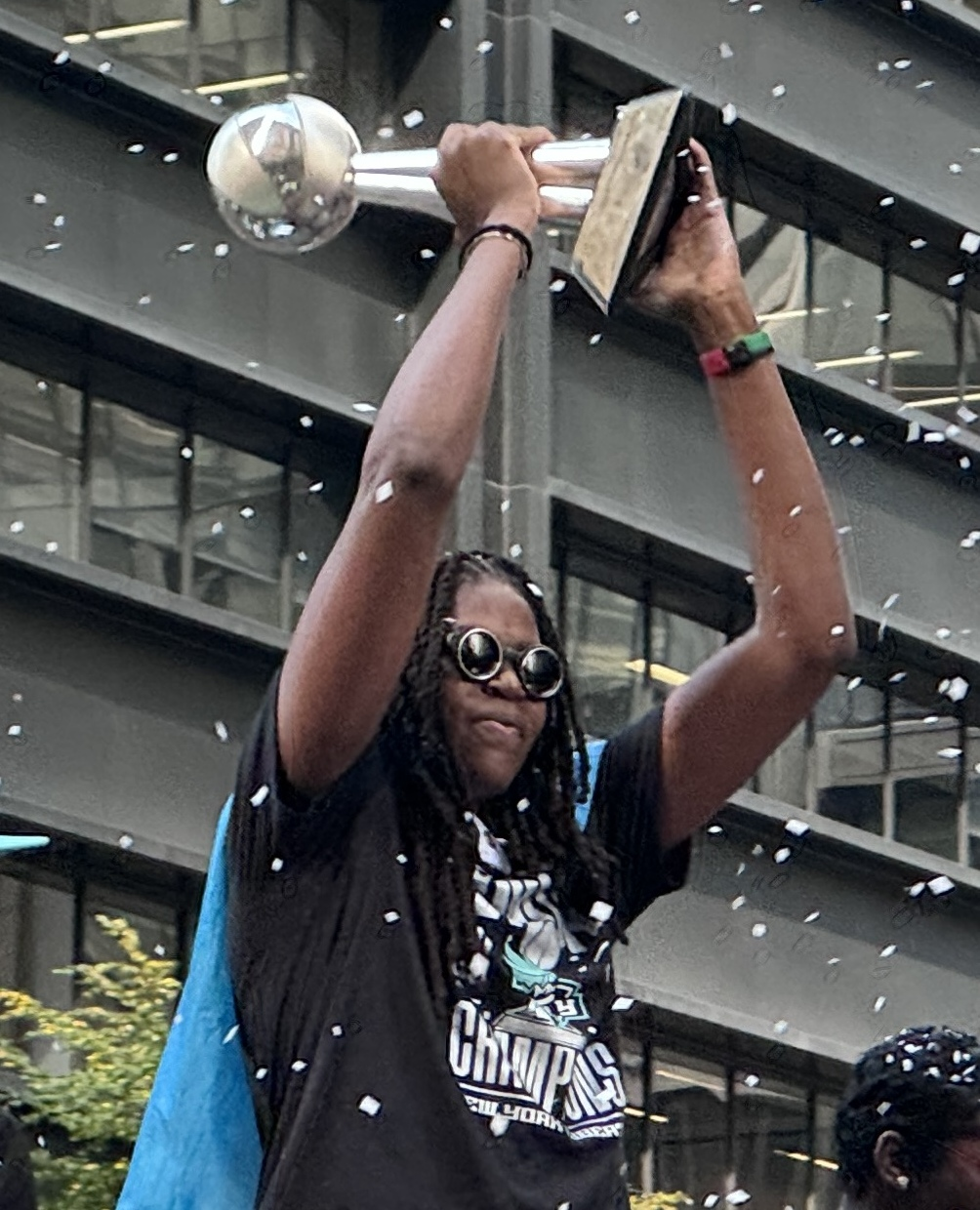
Jonquel Jones hoisting her 2024 WNBA Finals MVP trophy at her team's championship parade

Season	Player	Position	Nationality	Team
1997	Cynthia Cooper	Guard	United States	Houston Comets
1998	Cynthia Cooper (2)	Guard	United States	Houston Comets (2)
1999	Cynthia Cooper (3)	Guard	United States	Houston Comets (3)
2000	Cynthia Cooper (4)	Guard	United States	Houston Comets (4)
2001	Lisa Leslie	Center	United States	Los Angeles Sparks
2002	Lisa Leslie (2)	Center	United States	Los Angeles Sparks (2)
2003	Ruth Riley	Forward / Center	United States	Detroit Shock
2004	Betty Lennox	Guard	United States	Seattle Storm
2005	Yolanda Griffith	Center	United States	Sacramento Monarchs
2006	Deanna Nolan	Guard	United States	Detroit Shock
2007	Cappie Pondexter	Guard	United States	Phoenix Mercury
2008	Katie Smith	Guard	United States	Detroit Shock
2009	Diana Taurasi	Guard	United States	Phoenix Mercury (2)
2010	Lauren Jackson	Forward / Center	Australia	Seattle Storm (2)
2011	Seimone Augustus	Guard / Forward	United States	Minnesota Lynx
2012	Tamika Catchings	Forward	United States	Indiana Fever
2013	Maya Moore	Forward	United States	Minnesota Lynx (2)
2014	Diana Taurasi (2)	Guard	United States	Phoenix Mercury (3)
2015	Sylvia Fowles	Center	United States	Minnesota Lynx (3)
2016	Candace Parker	Forward	United States	Los Angeles Sparks (3)
2017	Sylvia Fowles (2)	Center	United States	Minnesota Lynx (4)
2018	Breanna Stewart	Forward / Center	United States	Seattle Storm (3)
2019	Emma Meesseman	Center	Belgium	Washington Mystics
2020	Breanna Stewart (2)	Forward / Center	United States	Seattle Storm (4)
2021	Kahleah Copper	Guard / Forward	United States	Chicago Sky
2022	Chelsea Gray	Guard	United States	Las Vegas Aces
2023	A'ja Wilson	Forward / Center	United States	Las Vegas Aces (2)
2024	Jonquel Jones	Forward / Center	Bahamas; Bosnia and Herzegovina	New York Liberty
2025	A'ja Wilson (2)	Forward / Center	United States	Las Vegas Aces (3)
2026	Gabby Williams	Forward	France	Golden State Valkyries

== Multi-time winners ==
Player	Team(s)	No.	Years
Cynthia Cooper	Houston Comets	4	1997, 1998, 1999, 2000
Lisa Leslie	Los Angeles Sparks	2	2001, 2002
Diana Taurasi	Phoenix Mercury	2	2009, 2014
Sylvia Fowles	Minnesota Lynx	2	2015, 2017
Breanna Stewart	Seattle Storm	2	2018, 2020
A'ja Wilson	Las Vegas Aces	2	2023, 2025

== See also ==
- List of sports awards honoring women
