= WNBA Most Valuable Player =

American women's basketball award

Figure on the top of the WNBA MVP Award

The Women's National Basketball Association Most Valuable Player (MVP) is an annual Women's National Basketball Association (WNBA) award given since the league's inaugural season in 1997. MVP voting takes place immediately after the regular season. The award recipient is decided by a panel of sportswriters and broadcasters throughout the United States. Panel members were asked to select their top five choices for the award, with 10 points being awarded for a first place vote, seven for second, five for third, three for fourth, and one for fifth.

In 2008, both media members and fans contributed to MVP voting. Fans were able to vote online for their top five MVP picks. Online fan vote selections accounted for 25% of the total vote, while the media panel's selections accounted for the other 75%.

A'ja Wilson has won the award the most times, with five; Sheryl Swoopes, Lisa Leslie, and Lauren Jackson have each won three times. Two players have won the award with different franchises—Elena Delle Donne in 2015 with the Chicago Sky and in 2019 with the Washington Mystics, and Breanna Stewart in 2018 with the Seattle Storm and in 2023 with the New York Liberty. Cynthia Cooper and Candace Parker have also won the award twice.

Candace Parker became the only WNBA player to win Rookie of the Year and MVP in the same season in 2008.

Jackson, born and trained in Australia, is the only award winner trained outside the U.S.

The sculptor of the WNBA MVP Award is Marc Mellon, who is also the sculptor of the NBA MVP trophy.

== Winners ==
Legend

	Denotes player who is still active in the WNBA
*	Inducted into the Naismith Memorial Basketball Hall of Fame
†	Not yet eligible for Hall of Fame consideration (Note: A player is not eligible for induction into the Naismith Memorial Basketball Hall of Fame until she has been fully retired for two calendar years.)
†	Inducted into the Women's Basketball Hall of Fame
‡	Denotes player whose team won championship that year
Player (X)	Denotes the number of times the player has been named MVP
Team (X)	Denotes the number of times a player from this team has won

Season	Player	Position	Nationality	Team	First-Place Votes	Ref.
1997 ‡	Cynthia Cooper * †	Guard	(United States)	Houston Comets	37 out of 37	
1998 ‡	Cynthia Cooper * † (2)	Guard	(United States)	Houston Comets (2)	37 out of 45	
1999	Yolanda Griffith * †	Center	(United States)	Sacramento Monarchs	23 out of 51	
2000 ‡	Sheryl Swoopes * †	Guard / Forward	(United States)	Houston Comets (3)	38 out of 62	
2001 ‡	Lisa Leslie * †	Center	(United States)	Los Angeles Sparks	51 out of 60	
2002	Sheryl Swoopes * † (2)	Guard / Forward	(United States)	Houston Comets (4)	29 out of 60	
2003	Lauren Jackson * †	Forward / Center	(Australia)	Seattle Storm	23 out of 54	
2004	Lisa Leslie * † (2)	Center	(United States)	Los Angeles Sparks (2)	33 out of 48	
2005	Sheryl Swoopes * † (3)	Guard / Forward	(United States)	Houston Comets (5)	16 out of 50 (Note: Second-place finisher, Lauren Jackson, received more first-place votes (20 to Swoopes' 16), but Swoopes earned 327 total points to Jackson's 325.)	
2006	Lisa Leslie * † (3)	Center	(United States)	Los Angeles Sparks (3)	40 out of 55	
2007	Lauren Jackson * † (2)	Forward / Center	(Australia)	Seattle Storm (2)	42 out of 48	
2008	Candace Parker * †	Forward	(United States)	Los Angeles Sparks (4)	276.79 out of 300 pts (Note: First-place vote counts were not released by the WNBA. For the first time, an online fan vote was included in post-season award voting, accounting for 25% of the vote. The other 75% came from a panel of 45 national sportswriters and broadcasters.)	
2009 ‡	Diana Taurasi^{†}	Guard	(United States)	Phoenix Mercury	27 out of 39	
2010 ‡	Lauren Jackson * † (3)	Forward / Center	(Australia)	Seattle Storm (3)	22 out of 39	
2011	Tamika Catchings * †	Forward	(United States)	Indiana Fever	21 out of 40	
2012	Tina Charles^{†}	Center	(United States)	Connecticut Sun	25 out of 41	
2013	Candace Parker * † (2)	Forward	(United States)	Los Angeles Sparks (5)	10 out of 39 (Note: Parker and Maya Moore tied in first-place voting with 10 votes each. However in the overall vote tally, Parker earned 234 total points to Moore's 218.)	
2014	Maya Moore* †	Forward	(United States)	Minnesota Lynx	35 out of 38	
2015	Elena Delle Donne * †	Guard / Forward	(United States)	Chicago Sky	38 out of 39	
2016 ‡	Nneka Ogwumike	Forward	(United States)	Los Angeles Sparks (6)	31 out of 39	
2017 ‡	Sylvia Fowles * †	Center	(United States)	Minnesota Lynx (2)	35 out of 40	
2018 ‡	Breanna Stewart	Forward	(United States)	Seattle Storm (4)	33 out of 39	
2019 ‡	Elena Delle Donne * † (2)	Guard / Forward	(United States)	Washington Mystics	41 out of 43	
2020	A'ja Wilson	Center	(United States)	Las Vegas Aces	43 out of 47	
2021	Jonquel Jones	Forward / Center	(The Bahamas) / (Bosnia and Herzegovina)	Connecticut Sun (2)	48 out of 49	
2022 ‡	A'ja Wilson (2)	Center	(United States)	Las Vegas Aces (2)	31 out of 56	
2023	Breanna Stewart (2)	Forward	(United States)	New York Liberty	20 out of 60 (Note: Second-place finisher, Alyssa Thomas, received more first-place votes (23 to Stewart's 20), but Stewart earned 446 total points to Thomas' 439.)	
2024	A'ja Wilson (3)	Center	(United States)	Las Vegas Aces (3)	67 out of 67	
2025 ‡	A'ja Wilson (4)	Center	(United States)	Las Vegas Aces (4)	51 out of 72	
2026	A'ja Wilson (5)	Center	(United States)	Las Vegas Aces (5)	65 out of 74	

== Multi-time winners ==
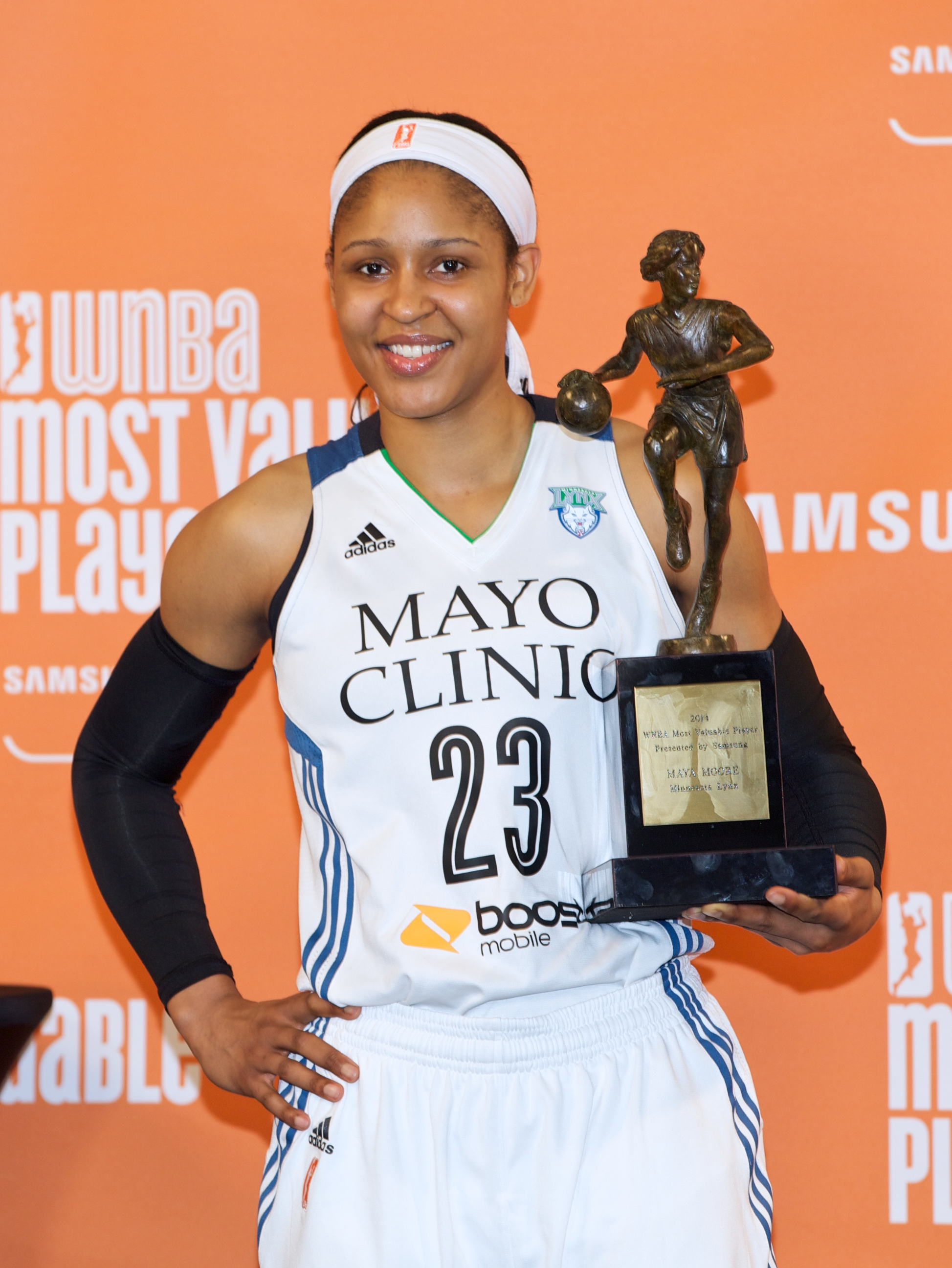
Maya Moore with her 2014 WNBA MVP trophy

Awards	Player	Team(s)	Years
5	A'ja Wilson	Las Vegas Aces	2020, 2022, 2024, 2025, 2026
3	Sheryl Swoopes	Houston Comets	2000, 2002, 2005
3	Lisa Leslie	Los Angeles Sparks	2001, 2004, 2006
3	Lauren Jackson	Seattle Storm	2003, 2007, 2010
2	Cynthia Cooper	Houston Comets	1997, 1998
2	Candace Parker	Los Angeles Sparks	2008, 2013
2	Elena Delle Donne	Chicago Sky / Washington Mystics	2015, 2019
2	Breanna Stewart	Seattle Storm / New York Liberty	2018, 2023

== Teams ==
Awards	Teams	Years
6	Los Angeles Sparks	2001, 2004, 2006, 2008, 2013, 2016
5	Houston Comets	1997, 1998, 2000, 2002, 2005
5	Las Vegas Aces	2020, 2022, 2024, 2025 2026
4	Seattle Storm	2003, 2007, 2010, 2018
2	Minnesota Lynx	2014, 2017
2	Connecticut Sun	2012, 2021
1	Sacramento Monarchs	1999
1	Phoenix Mercury	2009
1	Indiana Fever	2011
1	Chicago Sky	2015
1	Washington Mystics	2019
1	New York Liberty	2023
0	Dallas Wings	N/A
0	Atlanta Dream	N/A
0	Golden State Valkyries	N/A

== See also ==
- List of sports awards honoring women
