= Chamique Holdsclaw =

American basketball player (born 1977)

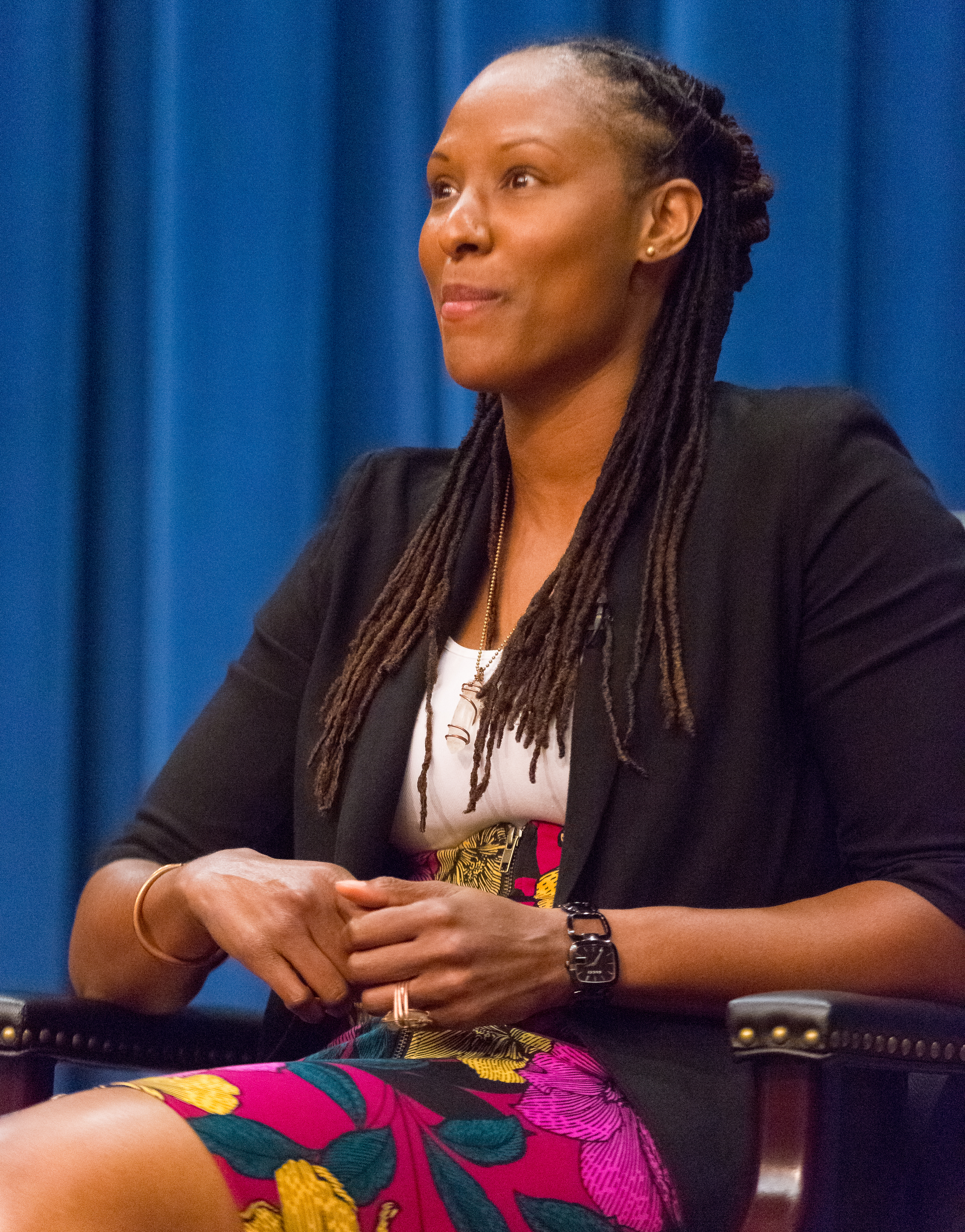
- Holdsclaw in 2016

Personal information
- Born: August 9, 1977 (age 49) Queens, New York, U.S.
- Listed height: 6 ft 2 in (1.88 m)
- Listed weight: 172 lb (78 kg)

Career information
- High school: Christ the King (Queens, New York)
- College: Tennessee (1995–1999)
- WNBA draft: 1999: 1st round, 1st overall pick
- Drafted by: Washington Mystics
- Playing career: 1999–2010
- Position: Small forward
- Number: 1

Career history
- 1999–2004: Washington Mystics
- 2005–2007: Los Angeles Sparks
- 2009: Atlanta Dream
- 2010: San Antonio Silver Stars
- 2013: Southern Lady Generals

Career highlights
- 6× WNBA All-Star (1999–2003, 2005); 3× All-WNBA Second Team (1999, 2001, 2002); Dawn Staley Community Leadership Award (2010); WNBA Rookie of the Year (1999); 2× WNBA rebounding champion (2002, 2003); WNBA scoring champion (2002); Sullivan Award (1998); 3× NCAA champion (1996–1998); 2× NCAA Tournament MOP (1997, 1998); 2× Naismith College Player of the Year (1998, 1999); 2× AP Player of the Year (1998, 1999); 2× USBWA Player of the Year (1998, 1999); 2× Honda Sports Award (1998, 1999); Honda-Broderick Cup (1998); 2× WBCA Player of the Year (1998, 1999); 4× All-American – USBWA, Kodak (1996–1999); 3× First-team All-American – AP (1997–1999); Third-team All-American – AP (1996); 2× SEC Female Athlete of the Year (1998, 1999); 2× SEC Player of the Year (1998, 1999); 2× SEC Tournament MVP (1998, 1999); USA Basketball Female Athlete of the Year (1997); 4× First-team All-SEC (1996–1999); USBWA National Freshman of the Year (1996); SEC Freshman of the Year (1996); SEC All-Freshman Team (1996); Naismith Prep Player of the Year (1995); Co-Miss New York Basketball (1995); WUBA ALL-STAR (2013)
- Stats at WNBA.com
- Stats at Basketball Reference
- Basketball Hall of Fame
- Women's Basketball Hall of Fame
Medals
Representing USA
Olympic Games
Gold medal – first place	2000 Sydney	National Team
FIBA World Championship for Women
Gold medal – first place	1998 Berlin	Team competition

Chamique Shaunta Holdsclaw (born August 9, 1977) is an American former professional basketball player in the Women's National Basketball Association (WNBA). She announced her retirement from the Los Angeles Sparks on June 11, 2007, though she eventually came out of retirement to play with the Atlanta Dream for the 2009 WNBA season.

Holdsclaw was inducted into the NYC Basketball Hall of Fame in 2015, the Women's Basketball Hall of Fame in 2018, and the Naismith Basketball Hall of Fame in 2026.

== Early life ==
Holdsclaw was raised in Astoria Houses in Astoria, Queens.

She grew up playing basketball. While attending Christ the King Regional High School in Queens, New York, she played for the school's women's basketball team, and led them to four straight New York State Championships in basketball. Holdsclaw was named a High School All-American by the Women's Basketball Coaches Association (WBCA). She participated in the WBCA High School All-America Game in 1995, scoring eight points.

== College career ==
Holdsclaw went to the University of Tennessee from 1995 to 1999, where she played under coach Pat Summitt and helped to lead the Lady Vols to the women's NCAA's first ever three consecutive Women's Basketball Championships in 1996, 1997 and 1998. The 1998 championship was Tennessee's first ever undefeated season at 39–0 and also set an NCAA record for the most wins ever in a season. She also helped lead Tennessee to two SEC regular season titles in 1998 and 1999 and to three SEC tournament championships in 1996, 1998 and 1999.

At Tennessee, Holdsclaw was a four-time Kodak All-America, one of only six women's basketball players to earn the honor (along with teammate Tamika Catchings, Cheryl Miller of USC, Ann Meyers of UCLA, Lynette Woodard of Kansas and LaToya Thomas of Mississippi State.) Holdsclaw finished her career with 3,025 points and 1,295 rebounds, making her the all-time leading scoring and rebounder at Tennessee in men's or women's history, the all-time leading scorer and rebounder in SEC women's history, and the all-time leading scorer and rebounder in the NCAA tournament women's history with 470 points and 197 rebounds. She was also only the fifth women's basketball player in NCAA history to have 3,000 points (a list including Jackie Stiles of Southwest Missouri State, Patricia Hoskins of Mississippi Valley State, Lorri Bauman of Drake, Cheryl Miller of USC, and Cindy Blodgett of Maine). She is also one of five women's collegiate basketball players to ever accumulate over 2,000 points, 1,000 rebounds, 300 assists and 300 steals (a list that includes teammate Tamika Catchings, Cheryl Miller of USC, Sophia Young of Baylor, and Armintie Price of Mississippi.) In 1998, Holdsclaw received the James E. Sullivan Award as the top amateur athlete in the United States. Holdsclaw also won the Naismith trophy for player of the year twice, in 1998 and 1999, and posted a 131–17 win–loss record during her remarkable career as a Lady Vol. In 2000, she was named Naismith's Player of the Century for the 1990s and was also part of an ESPY award given to the Lady Vols as Co-Team of the Decade for the 1990s. In 1996, 1997, and 1998, Holdsclaw was named to the Final Four All Tournament team.

In 2006, Holdsclaw was named to a women's collegiate basketball silver anniversary team for being picked as one of the 25 greatest players of the past 25 years. She was also picked as one of the 5 greatest players in the SEC of the past 25 years.

Holdsclaw is a member of Alpha Kappa Alpha sorority.

== WNBA career ==
In the 1999 WNBA draft, Holdsclaw was selected by the Washington Mystics 1st overall. After this selection, Holdsclaw gained the distinction of being the first female athlete to appear on the cover of SLAM magazine. Furthermore, Holdsclaw was pictured in a New York Knicks jersey, implying that perhaps she was good enough to play in the NBA.

In her first season, she was named the Rookie of the Year, the first number one draft pick to win that honor. She was also a starter in the inaugural WNBA All-Star Game that same year. She averaged 16.9 points and 7.9 rebounds per game in her first season. The next year, Holdsclaw was named to the Olympic team, helping to lead them to a gold medal.

During her subsequent seasons in the WNBA, Holdsclaw continued to improve her numbers. In 2002, despite missing several games with an ankle injury, Holdsclaw averaged a double-double per game with 19.9 points and 11.5 rebounds. By 2003, she was averaging 20.5 points and 10.9 rebounds per game. On July 24, 2004, however, she failed to show up for a game against Charlotte, played one more game in reserve and then did not play the rest of the season including the entire playoffs.

On March 21, 2005, Holdsclaw was traded to the Los Angeles Sparks in exchange for DeLisha Milton-Jones.

In May 2006, Holdsclaw took a sudden two-week leave from playing for the Sparks, but later clarified that this was due to the serious illnesses of her father and stepfather. As of late June, she was averaging 14.4 points per game and 7 rebounds per game.

On June 11, 2007, only a few weeks into the 2007 WNBA season, she surprisingly announced she was retiring and did not immediately provide any explanation as to her sudden departure.

On December 17, 2008, the Atlanta Dream traded the 13th pick in the 2009 WNBA draft to the Los Angeles Sparks in exchange for the rights to Holdsclaw. Holdsclaw stated she definitely considered a return to the WNBA if healthy, and did. Holdsclaw was a constant part of the team's offense and a starter that season, despite an injury that kept her out several games toward the end of the season. However, she returned just in time for one game in the playoffs. The Dream lost to the Detroit Shock.

On May 19, 2010, she was released from the Dream after requesting a trade and did not report to the team. Two days later, she signed with the San Antonio Silver Stars.

== Career statistics ==
Legend
GP	Games played	GS	Games started	MPG	Minutes per game	RPG	Rebounds per game
APG	Assists per game	SPG	Steals per game	BPG	Blocks per game	PPG	Points per game
TO	Turnovers per game	FG%	Field-goal percentage	3P%	3-point field-goal percentage	FT%	Free-throw percentage
**Bold**	Career best	°	League leader

=== WNBA ===
==== Regular season ====
Year	Team	GP	GS	MPG	FG%	3P%	FT%	RPG	APG	SPG	BPG	PPG
1999	Washington	31	30	34.2	.437	.172	.773	7.9	2.4	1.2	**0.9**	16.9
2000	Washington	32	32	35.3	.465	.256	.680	7.5	2.5	1.5	0.6	17.5
2001	Washington	29	29	33.6	.400	.239	.682	8.8	2.3	1.5	0.5	16.8
2002	Washington	20	20	31.7	.452	.393	.830	**11.6**°	2.3	1.0	0.3	19.9°
2003	Washington	27	27	35.1	.425	.171	**.903**	10.9°	**3.3**	1.3	0.6	**20.5**
2004	Washington	23	22	34.8	.402	.412	.803	8.3	2.4	**1.7**	0.8	19.0
2005	Los Angeles	**33**	**33**	**35.8**	.480	.231	.788	6.8	3.2	1.2	0.5	17.0
2006	Los Angeles	25	0	29.5	.470	.200	.884	6.1	2.2	1.4	0.4	15.0
2007	Los Angeles	5	5	30.0	.492	**.667**	.833	5.6	3.0	1.2	0.6	15.8
2009	Atlanta	25	25	28.3	.414	.200	.839	4.4	2.2	1.4	0.3	13.9
2010	San Antonio	29	29	29.0	**.494**	.355	.806	5.3	2.0	1.5	0.3	13.6
Career	11 years, 4 teams	279	252	32.9	.443	.262	.794	7.6	2.5	1.3	0.5	16.9

==== Playoffs ====
Year	Team	GP	GS	MPG	FG%	3P%	FT%	RPG	APG	SPG	BPG	PPG
2000	Washington	2	2	37.5	.448	.000	**1.000**	5.5	0.5	1.5	0.5	15.0
2002	Washington	**5**	**5**	34.6	.449	.182	.733	**8.6**	**3.2**	**2.0**	0.6	**18.8**
2005	Los Angeles	2	2	**39.0**	**.519**	**1.000**	.400	**5.0**	1.0	**2.0**	0.0	15.5
2006	Los Angeles	3	1	14.7	.333	.500	.000	3.7	1.3	0.3	**0.7**	4.3
2009	Atlanta	1	0	13.0	.250	.000	**1.000**	3.0	0.0	0.0	0.0	3.0
Career	5 years, 3 teams	13	10	29.5	.442	.250	.725	6.0	1.8	1.4	0.5	13.2

=== College ===
Year	Team	GP	GS	MPG	FG%	3P%	FT%	RPG	APG	SPG	BPG	TO	PPG
1995–96	Tennessee	36	-	-	46.7	23.3	71.3	9.1	2.1	0.9	0.6	-	16.2
1996–97	Tennessee	**39**	-	-	49.8	**34.0**	66.7	**9.4**	2.9	2.4	**0.9**	-	20.6
1997–98	Tennessee	**39**	-	-	**54.6**	22.0	**76.5**	8.4	**3.0**	**2.8**	**0.9**	-	**23.5**
1998–99	Tennessee	34	-	-	51.9	14.3	70.7	8.1	2.4	2.1	0.7	-	21.3
**Career**		148	-	-	51.0	25.4	71.5	8.8	2.6	2.1	0.8	-	20.4
Statistics retrieved from Sports-Reference.

== USA Basketball ==
Holdsclaw was a member of the National team who traveled to Berlin, Germany in July and August 1998 for the FIBA World Championships. The USA team won a close opening game against Japan 95–89, then won their next six games easily. In the quarterfinals, Holdsclaw scored 20 points to help team advance. After trailing late in the final game, the USA held on to win the gold medal 71–65. Holdsclaw averaged 10.9 points per game, third highest on the team.

Holdsclaw continued with the National team to the 2000 Olympics in Sydney, Australia. The USA won all eight games, including the gold medal game against host Australia to win the gold medal, although Holdsclaw had a stress fracture in her right foot and was unable to compete.

== Awards and honors ==
- 1997—Naismith College Player of the Year
- 1997—Associated Press Women's College Basketball Player of the Year
- 1997—USBWA Women's National Player of the Year
- 1997—Winner of the Honda Sports Award for basketball
- 1997—WBCA Player of the Year
- 1998—Naismith College Player of the Year award
- 1998—Associated Press Women's College Basketball Player of the Year
- 1998—USBWA Women's National Player of the Year
- 1998—Winner of the Honda Sports Award for basketball
- 1998—WBCA Player of the Year
- 1998—The Honda-Broderick Cup winner for all sports
- 2015—Inducted into the NYC Basketball Hall of Fame
- 2018—Inducted into the Women's Basketball Hall of Fame
- 2025—Inducted into the Tennessee Sports Hall of Fame
- 2026—Inducted into the Naismith Basketball Hall of Fame

== International career ==
=== Europe ===
- 2004–2005: (Spain) Ros Casares Valencia
- 2006–2007: (Poland) TS Wisla Can-Pack Kraków, championship, MVP of the finals; season's average: 17.9 points per game
- 2007–2008: (Poland) Lotos PKO BP Gdynia
- 2008–2009: (Poland) TS Wisla Can-Pack Kraków

== Chamique Holdsclaw Foundation ==
Today, Holdsclaw works as a mental health advocate.

== Personal life ==
Holdsclaw wrote in her autobiography Breaking Through: Beating the Odds Shot after Shot (2012, ISBN 0985029803) that she had suffered depression during her professional basketball career, and attempted suicide on one occasion.

Atlanta police issued an arrest warrant for Holdsclaw on November 15, 2012, after Holdsclaw allegedly attacked her ex-girlfriend's car with a baseball bat and shot at the car. The owner of the car, fellow WNBA player Jennifer Lacy, was uninjured. It was announced on February 27, 2013, that Holdsclaw was being indicted for the November shooting in Atlanta. It is a six-count indictment charging her with aggravated assault, criminal damage and possession of a firearm during the commission of a felony. Holdsclaw was released from jail after posting a $100,000 bond and a court date was not set.

Holdsclaw pleaded guilty June 14, 2013, to aggravated assault, possession of a firearm during the commission of a felony and other charges. She was sentenced to three years' probation and ordered to perform 120 hours of community service and pay a $3,000 fine under the plea agreement. Holdsclaw's attorney Ed Garland said his client "felt that to honestly accept what her actions were was best for everyone concerned".

Documentary filmmaker Rick Goldsmith produced a film on Holdsclaw's life and battle with mental illness called Mind/Game: The Unquiet Journey of Chamique Holdsclaw which aired on Logo TV on May 3, 2016.

She married former basketball player Cara Wright in Tennessee on July 7, 2018.

== See also ==
- List of NCAA Division I women's basketball players with 2,500 points and 1,000 rebounds
- List of NCAA Division I women's basketball career scoring leaders
- List of NCAA Division I women's basketball season scoring leaders
