= List of UConn Huskies in the WNBA draft =

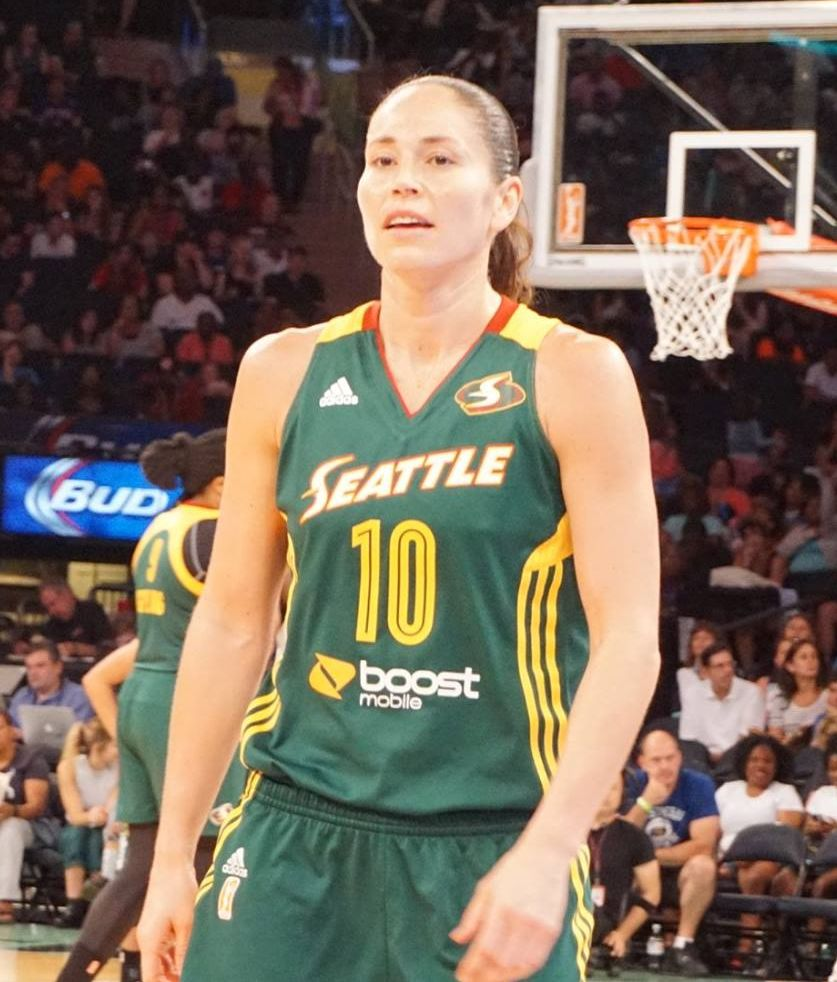
Sue Bird was the first UConn Huskies alumna to be drafted first overall.

The UConn Huskies women's basketball team, representing the University of Connecticut in NCAA Division I college basketball, has had 50 players selected in the Women's National Basketball Association (WNBA) draft. Of these selections, 29 were in the first round of the draft; seven players—Sue Bird in 2002, Diana Taurasi in 2004, Tina Charles in 2010, Maya Moore in 2011, Breanna Stewart in 2016, Paige Bueckers in 2025, and Azzi Fudd in 2026—were picked first overall. At least one UConn women's basketball alumna was selected or allocated in every WNBA Draft from 2009 to 2020, with the 2021 draft being only the third in which no Huskies player was chosen.^{[General]}

Each WNBA franchise seeks to add new players through their respective annual draft. The WNBA uses a draft lottery to determine the order of selection for the first picks of the draft; the teams that did not make the playoffs the previous year are eligible to participate. After the first picks are decided, the remaining teams select in reverse order of their win–loss record. The WNBA requires that players be at least 22 years old during the calendar year of the applicable seasons, have either graduated from a four-year university or have completed their intercollegiate basketball eligibility, or have played at least two seasons for another professional basketball league.

In addition to the 48 draftees, two UConn women's basketball players—Rebecca Lobo in 1997 and Nykesha Sales in 1999—were allocated to specific teams during the initial formation of the WNBA. Lobo was assigned to the New York Liberty and is considered one of the WNBA's first players. Sales was the first player for the expansion Orlando Miracle; the team would later relocate and become the Connecticut Sun.

UConn women's basketball alumni have had a significant impact on the WNBA. Seven players—Taurasi, Charles, Moore, Stewart, Napheesa Collier, Crystal Dangerfield, and Bueckers—were named WNBA Rookie of the Year, and the first four named players were later named WNBA Most Valuable Player (MVP). Several other UConn alumni have been named to All-WNBA teams or selected as WNBA All-Stars on multiple occasions. Ten UConn players have been named to the All-Rookie Team, including five of the school's six Rookies of the Year (Taurasi's rookie season predated the 2005 establishment of the All-Rookie Team). Fourteen Huskies alumni have been part of WNBA championship teams, and three have been named WNBA Finals MVP: Maya Moore in 2013, Diana Taurasi in 2009 and 2014 and Breanna Stewart in 2018 and 2020. The current all-time leader of assists in the WNBA is Sue Bird (drafted 1st in 2002) and the current all-time scoring leader is Diana Taurasi (drafted first in 2004).

== Player selection ==
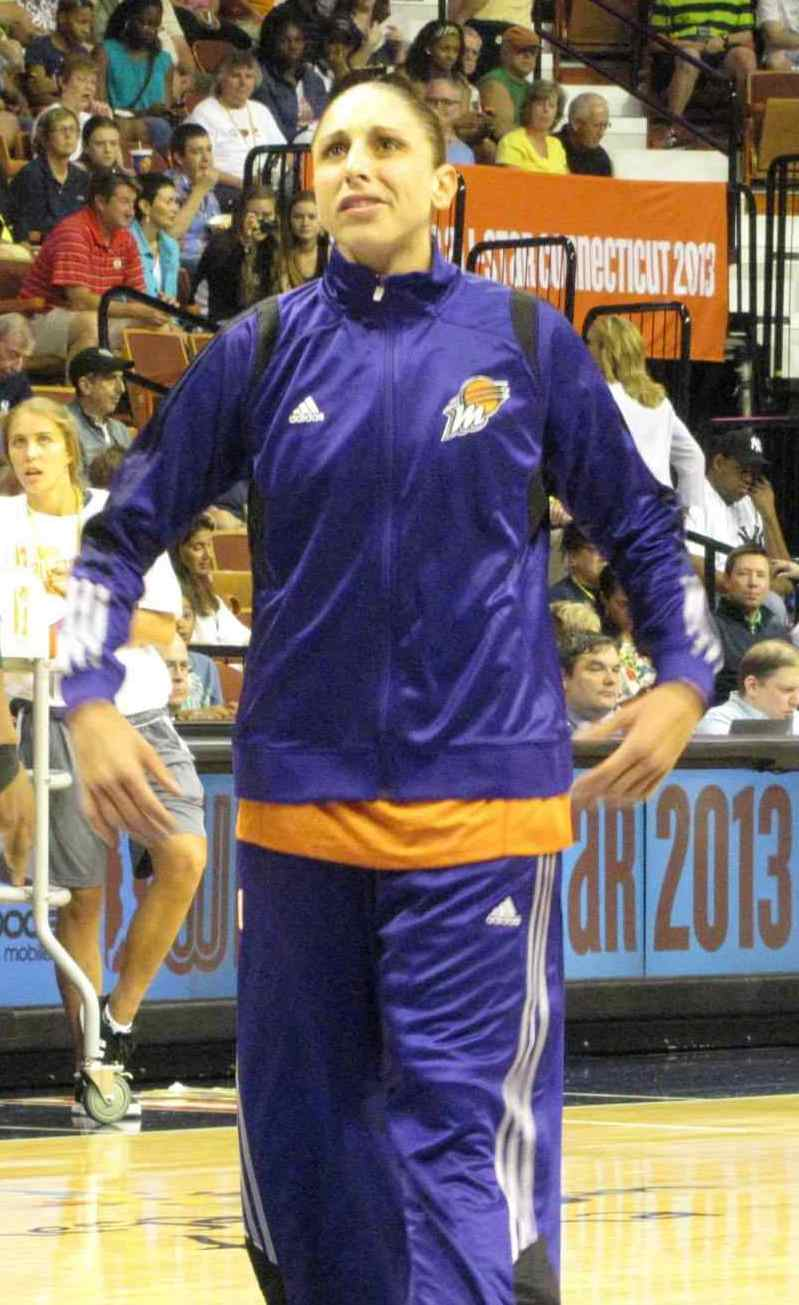
First-overall selection and UConn women's basketball alumna Diana Taurasi was named WNBA Most Valuable Player in 2009.

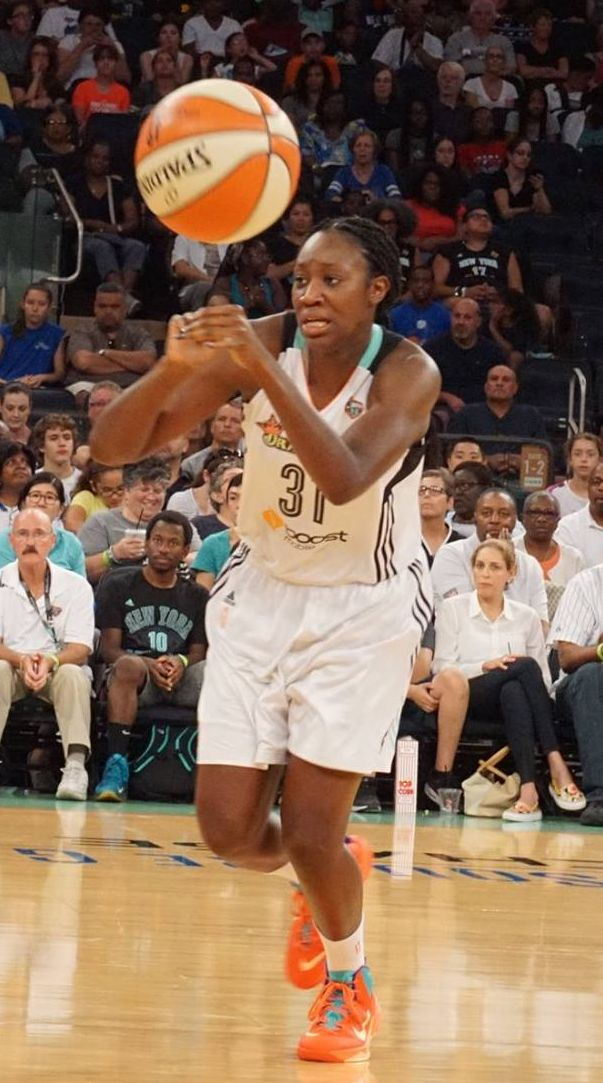
Tina Charles was the third UConn player to be selected first overall, in 2010. She was named WNBA Most Valuable Player in 2012.

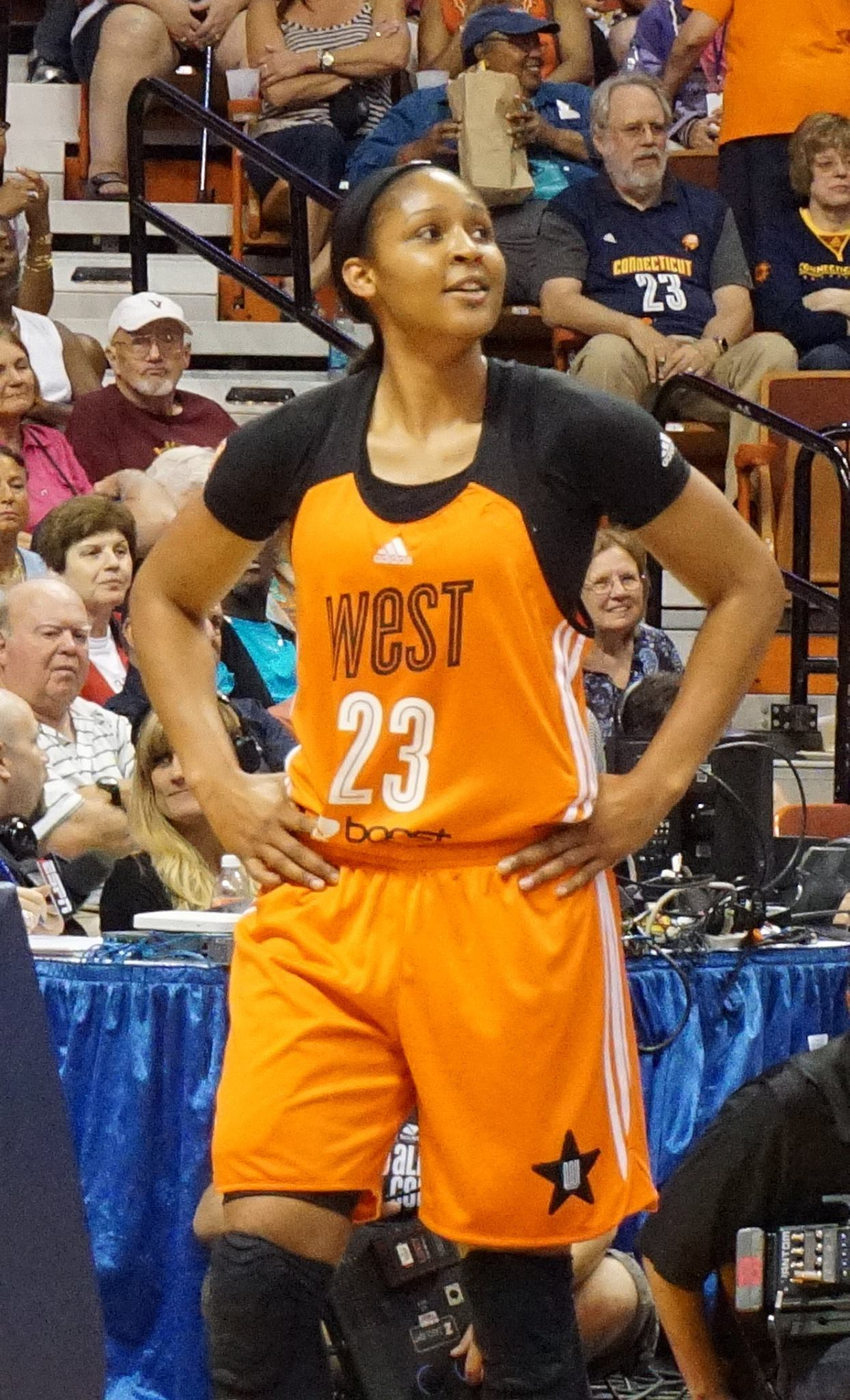
The fourth UConn alumna to be selected first overall, Maya Moore was the 2014 WNBA Most Valuable Player.

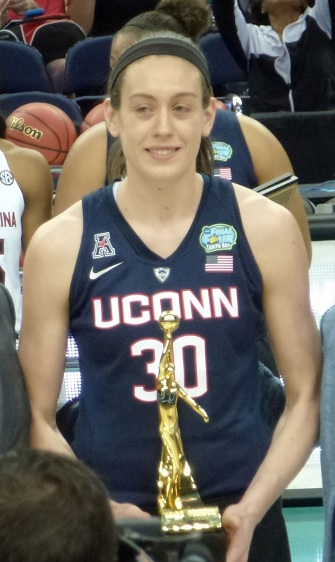
Breanna Stewart is the fifth UConn women's basketball player to be drafted first overall, and the fourth to be named both WNBA Rookie of the Year (2016) and Most Valuable Player (2018).

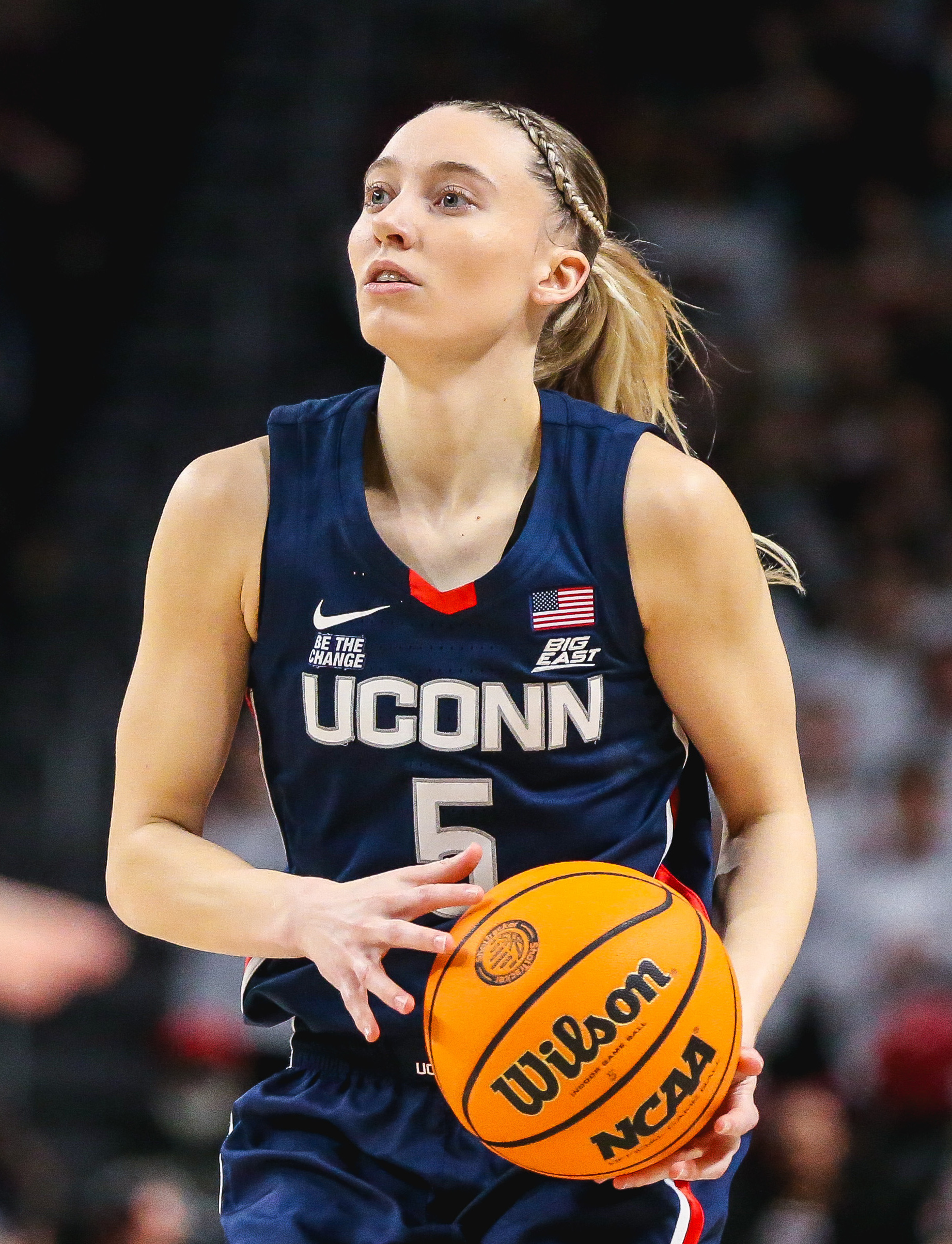
Paige Bueckers is the sixth UConn women's basketball player to be drafted first overall, having been so chosen in 2025, and rookie of the year(2025)

=== Allocations ===
Year	Player name	Position	WNBA team (Note: This is the team that drafted the player, not the player's most recent team.)	Notes	Refs
1997	Rebecca Lobo	F/C	New York Liberty	All-WNBA Second Team (1997); All-Star (1999); Hall of Fame (2017)	
1999	Nykesha Sales	G/F	Orlando Miracle	All-WNBA Second Team (2004); All-Star (1999–2006)	

=== Regular draft ===
**Bold**	Denotes player who is still active as of the 2025 WNBA season

Year	Rnd	Pick	Overall	Player name	Position	WNBA team	Notes	Refs
1998	2	3	13	Rita Williams	G	Washington Mystics	All-Star (2001)	
1999	3	12	36	Kara Wolters	C	Houston Comets	WNBA champion (1999)	
1999	4	12	48	Jennifer Rizzotti	G	Houston Comets	WNBA champion (1999, 2000)	
2000	2	15	31	Paige Sauer	C	Los Angeles Sparks	—	
2001	1	7	7	Svetlana Abrosimova	F	Minnesota Lynx	WNBA champion (2010)	
2001	1	14	14	Kelly Schumacher	F/C	Indiana Fever	WNBA champion (2007, 2008)	
2001	3	8	40	Shea Ralph	G	Utah Starzz	(Note: Despite being drafted, Shea Ralph never played in the WNBA. After suffering a torn anterior cruciate ligament (ACL) in her left knee in February 2002—the third ACL tear in her left knee and her fifth ACL tear overall—she opted to retire from playing and start a coaching career.)	
2002	1	1	1	Sue Bird	G	Seattle Storm	WNBA champion (2004, 2010, 2018, 2020); WNBA All-Decade Team (2006); WNBA Top 20@20 (2016); The W25 (2021); All-WNBA First Team (2002–05, 2016, 2018); All-WNBA Second Team (2008, 2010, 2011); All-Star (2002–03, 2005–07, 2009, 2011, 2014–15, 2017–18, 2021–22); Hall of Fame (2025)	
2002	1	2	2	Swin Cash	F	Detroit Shock	WNBA champion (2003, 2006, 2010); WNBA Top 20@20 (2016); The W25 (2021); All-WNBA Second Team (2003, 2004); All-Star (2003, 2005, 2009, 2011)	
2002	1	4	4	Asjha Jones	F	Washington Mystics	WNBA champion (2015); All-WNBA Second Team (2008); All-Star (2007, 2009)	
2002	1	6	6	Tamika Williams	F	Minnesota Lynx	—	
2003	No selections							
2004	1	1	1	Diana Taurasi	G	Phoenix Mercury	WNBA champion (2007, 2009, 2014); MVP (2009); WNBA Top 20@20 (2016); The W25 (2021); Rookie of the Year (2004); All-WNBA First Team (2004, 2006–11, 2013–14, 2018); All-WNBA Second Team (2005, 2016–17, 2020); All-Star (2005–07, 2009, 2011, 2013–14, 2017–18, 2021, 2024)	
2005	2	11	24	Jessica Moore	C	Charlotte Sting	—	
2005	2	12	25	Ashley Battle	F	Seattle Storm	—	
2006	1	11	11	Barbara Turner	G	Seattle Storm	—	
2006	2	1	15	Ann Strother	G	Houston Comets	—	
2006	2	8	22	Willnett Crockett	F	Los Angeles Sparks	—	
2007	No selections							
2008	1	12	12	Ketia Swanier	G	Connecticut Sun	WNBA champion (2009)	
2008	3	2	30	Charde Houston	F	Minnesota Lynx	WNBA champion (2011); All-Star (2009)	
2009	1	4	4	Renee Montgomery	G	Minnesota Lynx	WNBA champion (2015, 2017); All-Star (2011); All-Rookie Team (2009)	
2010	1	1	1	**Tina Charles**	C	Connecticut Sun	MVP (2012); The W25 (2021); Rookie of the Year (2010); All-WNBA First Team (2011, 2012, 2015–17); All-WNBA Second Team (2010, 2013–14, 2021); All-Star (2011, 2013–15, 2017–19, 2021)	
2010	3	1	27	Kalana Greene	G	New York Liberty	WNBA champion (2015); All-Rookie Team (2010)	
2011	1	1	1	Maya Moore	F	Minnesota Lynx	WNBA champion (2011, 2013, 2015, 2017); MVP (2014); WNBA Top 20@20 (2016); The W25 (2021); Rookie of the Year (2011); All-WNBA First Team (2013, 2014, 2015, 2016, 2017); All-WNBA Second Team (2012, 2018); All-Star (2011, 2013, 2014, 2015, 2017, 2018); WNBA Finals MVP (2013); All-Star Game MVP (2015, 2017, 2018); Hall of Fame (2025)	
2012	2	2	14	**Tiffany Hayes**	G	Atlanta Dream	All-Rookie Team (2012); All-WNBA First Team (2018); All-Star (2017); Sixth Woman of the Year (2024) WNBA Champion (2026)	
2013	1	11	11	Kelly Faris	G	Connecticut Sun	—	
2014	1	6	6	**Stefanie Dolson**	F	Washington Mystics	WNBA champion (2021); All-Star (2015, 2017)	
2014	1	7	7	**Bria Hartley**	G	Seattle Storm	All-Rookie Team (2014)	
2015	1	3	3	Kaleena Mosqueda-Lewis	F	Seattle Storm	WNBA Champion (2018)	
2015	1	11	11	**Kiah Stokes**	C	New York Liberty	All-Rookie Team (2015); WNBA Champion (2022, 2023, 2025, 2026)	
2016	1	1	1	**Breanna Stewart**	F / C	Seattle Storm	WNBA Champion (2018, 2020, 2024); MVP (2018, 2023); The W25 (2021); Rookie of the Year (2016); All-WNBA First Team (2018, 2020–24); All-WNBA Second Team (2016); All-Rookie Team (2016); All-Star (2017–18, 2021–25); WNBA Finals MVP (2018, 2020)	
2016	1	2	2	**Moriah Jefferson**	G	San Antonio Stars	All-Rookie Team (2016)	
2016	1	3	3	Morgan Tuck	F	Connecticut Sun	WNBA Champion (2020)	
2017	3	2	26	Saniya Chong	G	Dallas Wings	—	
2018	1	4	4	**Gabby Williams**	F	Chicago Sky	All-Star (2025, 2026) WNBA Champion (2026)	
2018	1	6	6	**Azurá Stevens**	F	Dallas Wings	All-Rookie Team (2018); WNBA Champion (2021)	
2018	1	10	10	**Kia Nurse**	G	New York Liberty	All-Star (2019)	
2019	1	4	4	**Katie Lou Samuelson**	G-F	Chicago Sky	—	
2019	1	6	6	**Napheesa Collier**	F	Minnesota Lynx	Rookie of the Year (2019); Defensive Player of the Year (2024); All-Star (2019, 2021, 2023–25); All-WNBA First Team (2023–24); All-WNBA Second Team (2020)	
2020	1	9	9	Megan Walker	G	New York Liberty	—	
2020	2	4	16	Crystal Dangerfield	PG	Minnesota Lynx	Rookie of the Year (2020); All-Rookie Team (2020)	
2021	No selections							
2022	2	2	14	Christyn Williams	SG	Washington Mystics	—	
2022	2	7	19	**Olivia Nelson-Ododa**	C	Los Angeles Sparks	—	
2022	2	9	21	Evina Westbrook	PG	Seattle Storm	—	
2023	1	5	5	Lou Lopez Sénéchal	SG/SF	Dallas Wings	—	
2023	2	4	16	Dorka Juhász	F	Minnesota Lynx	All-Rookie Team (2023)	
2024	1	6	6	**Aaliyah Edwards**	F	Washington Mystics	—	
2024	2	2	14	Nika Mühl	PG	Seattle Storm	—	
2025	1	1	1	**Paige Bueckers**	PG	Dallas Wings	Rookie of the Year (2025); All-Star (2025); All-WNBA Second Team (2025); All-Rookie Team (2025)	
2025	3	5	30	**Kaitlyn Chen**	G	Golden State Valkyries	WNBA Champion (2026)	
2025	3	12	37	Aubrey Griffin	F	Minnesota Lynx	—	
2026	1	1	1	Azzi Fudd	G	Dallas Wings		
2026	3	3	33	Serah Williams	F	Connecticut Sun		
