= Schuey =

Schuey may refer to:

== People ==
=== Nicknamed ===
People with the nickname Schuey include:

- Kelly Schumacher (born 1977), U.S.-born Canadian basketball player
- Michael Schumacher (born 1969), German Formula One world champion
- Steven Schumacher (born 1984), British midfielder soccer player

== See also ==
- Schumacher (disambiguation)
