= 2001 Indiana Fever season =

2nd season in the WNBA

- Head coach: Nell Fortner
- Arena: Conseco Fieldhouse

Results
- Record: 10–22 (.313)
- Place: 6th (Eastern)
- Playoff finish: Did not qualify

Media
- Television: WNDY (UPN 23); Fox Sports Net Midwest

The 2001 Indiana Fever season was the franchise's 2nd season in the WNBA and their 1st season under head coach, Nell Fortner. In the 2001 WNBA draft, the Fever drafted Tamika Catchings as the 3rd pick, but due to a college injury, she missed the entire 2001 season. With that, the Fever tied with two teams with the worst record in the Eastern Conference, only ahead of the Detroit Shock and the Washington Mystics.

== Transactions ==
=== WNBA draft ===
Round	Pick	Player	Nationality	School/Team/Country
1	3	Tamika Catchings	United States	Tennessee
1	14	Kelly Schumacher	United States	UConn
2	19	Niele Ivey	United States	Notre Dame
3	35	Marlena Williams	United States	Missouri
4	51	April Brown	United States	LSU

=== Transactions ===
Date	Transaction
April 11, 2001	Traded Kara Wolters to the Sacramento Monarchs in exchange for a 2001 1st Round Pick
April 20, 2001	Drafted Tamika Catchings, Kelly Schumacher, Niele Ivey, Marlena Williams and April Brown in the 2001 WNBA draft
April 26, 2001	Waived Usha Gilmore
April 30, 2001	Signed Cornelia Gayden, Itoro Coleman, Lesley Brown, Nadine Malcolm and Sonia Chase
May 15, 2001	Waived April Brown
May 15, 2001	Signed Angie Braziel
May 18, 2001	Waived Lesley Brown
May 18, 2001	Waived Sonia Chase
May 27, 2001	Traded a 2002 2nd Round Pick to the Detroit Shock in exchange for a Olympia Scott-Richardson and a 2002 3rd Round Pick
May 27, 2001	Waived Cornelia Gayden, Katryna Gaither and Texlin Quinney
June 1, 2001	Waived Itoro Coleman
July 13, 2001	Waived Danielle McCulley
July 13, 2001	Signed Vicki Hall
December 5, 2001	Traded Angie Braziel, a 2002 1st Round Pick and a 2002 3rd Round Pick to the Washington Mystics in exchange for a Nikki McCray, 2002 2nd Round Pick and a 2002 4th Round Pick

== Roster ==
2001 Indiana Fever roster
Players
Coaches

Pos.	No.	Nat.	Name	Height	Weight	DOB	From	Yrs
F	45	(United States)	Braziel, Angie	6' 2" (1.88m)	169 lb (77kg)	1976-09-18	Texas Tech	2
G	10	(Socialist Federal Republic of Yugoslavia)	Grubin, Gordana	5' 11" (1.8m)	165 lb (75kg)	1972-08-20		2
F	44	(United States)	Hall, Vicki	6' 1" (1.85m)	180 lb (82kg)	1969-10-03	Texas	1
G	33	(United States)	Ivey, Niele	5' 7" (1.7m)	149 lb (68kg)	1977-09-24	Notre Dame	R
F	42	(Jamaica)	Malcolm, Nadine	6' 1" (1.85m)	170 lb (77kg)	1975-11-27	Providence	R
F	21	(United States)	Maxwell, Monica	5' 9" (1.75m)	162 lb (73kg)	1976-12-21	Louisiana Tech	2
G/F	22	(United States)	McCarty, Stephanie	5' 9" (1.75m)		1977-06-20	Purdue	2
F/C	5	(United States)	McCulley, Danielle	6' 3" (1.91m)	175 lb (79kg)	1975-01-18	Western Kentucky	1
C	20	(United States)	Schumacher, Kelly	6' 5" (1.96m)	183 lb (83kg)	1977-10-14	Connecticut	R
C	0	(United States)	Scott-Richardson, Olympia	6' 2" (1.88m)	175 lb (79kg)	1976-05-05	Stanford	3
F	7	(Soviet Union)	Štreimikytė, Jurgita	6' 2" (1.88m)	165 lb (75kg)	1974-05-14		1
F	43	(United States)	Thompson, Alicia	6' 1" (1.85m)	180 lb (82kg)	1976-06-30	Texas Tech	2
G	23	(United States)	Williams, Rita	5' 6" (1.68m)	135 lb (61kg)	1976-01-14	Connecticut	3

Head coach
(United States) Nell Fortner (Texas)
Assistant coaches
(United States) Julie Plank
(United States) Shelley Patterson

Legend

- (C) Team captain
- (DP) Unsigned draft pick
- (FA) Free agent
- (S) Suspended
- Injured

== Schedule ==
=== Regular season ===
2001 game log
Total: 10–22 (Home: 7–9; Road: 3–13)
May: 0–1 (Home: 0–1; Road: 0–0)

Game	Date	Team	Score	High points	High rebounds	High assists	Location Attendance	Record
1	May 31	Houston	L 78–82	Rita Williams (15)	Maxwell; Malcolm; Scott-Richardson (6)	Niele Ivey (5)	Conseco Fieldhouse	0–1

June : 4–7 (Home: 2–4; Road: 2–3)

Game	Date	Team	Score	High points	High rebounds	High assists	Location Attendance	Record
2	June 2	@ New York	L 58–75	Rita Williams (16)	Nadine Malcolm (7)	Rita Williams (4)	Madison Square Garden	0–2
3	June 4	Seattle	L 71–74 (OT)	Olympia Scott-Richardson (18)	Monica Maxwell (12)	Niele Ivey (6)	Conseco Fieldhouse	0–3
4	June 5	@ Miami	L 61–63	Rita Williams (15)	Kelly Schumacher (8)	Rita Williams (2)	American Airlines Arena	0–4
5	June 9	@ Cleveland	L 76–86	Nadine Malcolm (15)	Schumacher; Thompson (5)	Rita Williams (6)	Gund Arena	0–5
6	June 12	@ Minnesota	W 65–60	Rita Williams (15)	Olympia Scott-Richardson (10)	Ivey; McCarty; Williams (3)	Target Center	1–5
7	June 16	Minnesota	W 67–65	Nadine Malcolm (25)	Olympia Scott-Richardson (10)	Niele Ivey (3)	Conseco Fieldhouse	2–5
8	June 18	Orlando	L 65–72	Stephanie McCarty (20)	Alicia Thompson (6)	Monica Maxwell (4)	Conseco Fieldhouse	2–6
9	June 22	Detroit	W 77–56	Rita Williams (16)	Olympia Scott-Richardson (10)	Rita Williams (6)	Conseco Fieldhouse	3–6
10	June 23	@ Detroit	W 74–70	Scott-Richardson; Williams (15)	Kelly Schumacher (7)	Rita Williams (3)	The Palace of Auburn Hills	4–6
11	June 27	Portland	L 65–68	Rita Williams (20)	Schumacher; Scott-Richardson (8)	Ivey; Scott-Richardson (3)	Conseco Fieldhouse	4–7
12	June 29	Charlotte	L 67–75	Olympia Scott-Richardson (19)	Olympia Scott-Richardson (8)	Grubin; Ivey; McCarty; Scott-Richardson; Štreimikytė; Williams (2)	Conseco Fieldhouse	4–8

July : 4–9 (Home: 3–4; Road: 1–5)

Game	Date	Team	Score	High points	High rebounds	High assists	Location Attendance	Record
13	July 1	Phoenix	W 86–78 (OT)	Rita Williams (21)	Rita Williams (9)	Rita Williams (9)	Conseco Fieldhouse	5–8
14	July 6	@ Houston	L 64–79	Braziel; Thompson (10)	Angie Braziel (10)	Grubin; Maxwell; Thompson; Williams (2)	Compaq Center	5–9
15	July 8	New York	L 56–58	Olympia Scott-Richardson (12)	Olympia Scott-Richardson (9)	Jurgita Štreimikytė (4)	Conseco Fieldhouse	5–10
16	July 9	@ New York	L 65–72	Nadine Malcolm (23)	Olympia Scott-Richardson (7)	Rita Williams (6)	Madison Square Garden	5–11
17	July 11	Cleveland	L 58–76	Jurgita Štreimikytė (22)	Jurgita Štreimikytė (5)	Rita Williams (5)	Conseco Fieldhouse	5–12
18	July 13	Orlando	W 74–60	Jurgita Štreimikytė (16)	Malcolm; Scott-Richardson (8)	Rita Williams (5)	Conseco Fieldhouse	6–12
19	July 14	@ Charlotte	L 58–71	Nadine Malcolm (17)	Jurgita Štreimikytė (8)	Jurgita Štreimikytė (4)	Charlotte Coliseum	6–13
20	July 18	Utah	L 57–61	Scott-Richardson; Štreimikytė (12)	Jurgita Štreimikytė (11)	Ivey; Williams (4)	Conseco Fieldhouse	6–14
21	July 20	Washington	W 73–65	Jurgita Štreimikytė (12)	Braziel; Malcolm; Štreimikytė (7)	Stephanie McCarty (6)	Conseco Fieldhouse	7–14
22	July 22	@ Washington	L 61–69	Nadine Malcolm (14)	Olympia Scott-Richardson (7)	McCarty; Štreimikytė (5)	MCI Center	7–15
23	July 24	@ Charlotte	L 66–75	Jurgita Štreimikytė (19)	Ivey; Malcolm; Scott-Richardson (4)	Gordana Grubin (6)	Charlotte Coliseum	7–16
24	July 27	@ Cleveland	W 67–63	Gordana Grubin (23)	Angie Braziel (6)	Štreimikytė; Williams (4)	Gund Arena	8–16
25	July 28	Miami	L 63–69	Alicia Thompson (16)	Gordana Grubin (6)	Ivey; Williams (5)	Conseco Fieldhouse	8–17

August : 2–5 (Home: 2–0; Road: 0–5)

Game	Date	Team	Score	High points	High rebounds	High assists	Location Attendance	Record
26	August 1	Washington	W 70–64	Jurgita Štreimikytė (21)	Jurgita Štreimikytė (8)	McCarty; Williams (3)	Conseco Fieldhouse	9–17
27	August 3	@ Sacramento	L 69–81	Jurgita Štreimikytė (14)	Angie Braziel (7)	Rita Williams (5)	ARCO Arena	9–18
28	August 4	@ Utah	L 54–65	Thompson; Williams (13)	Angie Braziel (6)	Jurgita Štreimikytė (3)	Delta Center	9–19
29	August 6	@ Los Angeles	L 66–81	Alicia Thompson (17)	Niele Ivey (6)	Niele Ivey (5)	Staples Center	9–20
30	August 10	@ Miami	L 67–72 (OT)	Rita Williams (20)	Jurgita Štreimikytė (8)	Ivey; Štreimikytė (2)	American Airlines Arena	9–21
31	August 12	Detroit	W 83–66	Rita Williams (20)	Olympia Scott-Richardson (9)	Rita Williams (10)	Conseco Fieldhouse	10–21
32	August 14	@ Orlando	L 72–78	Rita Williams (18)	Jurgita Štreimikytė (8)	Alicia Thompson (4)	TD Waterhouse Centre	10–22

2001 season schedule

=== Season standings ===
Eastern Conference	W	L	PCT	Conf.	GB
Cleveland Rockers ^{x}	22	10	.688	15–6	–
New York Liberty ^{x}	21	11	.656	13–8	1.0
Miami Sol ^{x}	20	12	.625	14–7	2.0
Charlotte Sting ^{x}	18	14	.563	15–6	4.0
Orlando Miracle ^{o}	13	19	.406	9–12	9.0
Indiana Fever ^{o}	10	22	.313	7–14	12.0
Detroit Shock ^{o}	10	22	.313	7–14	12.0
Washington Mystics ^{o}	10	22	.313	4–17	12.0

== Statistics ==
Legend
GP	Games played	GS	Games started	MPG	Minutes per game	RPG	Rebounds per game
APG	Assists per game	SPG	Steals per game	BPG	Blocks per game	PPG	Points per game
FG%	Field-goal percentage	3P%	3-point field-goal percentage	FT%	Free-throw percentage	TO	Turnovers per game
PF	Fouls per game		Team leader		League leader

=== Regular season ===
Player	GP	GS	MPG	FG%	3P%	FT%	RPG	APG	SPG	BPG	PPG
Rita Williams	32	29	32.6	.392	.376	.833	3.3	3.6	2.3	0.3	11.9
Jurgita Štreimikytė	27	26	26.2	.478	.000	.842	5.1	1.9	1.4	0.7	9.1
Olympia Scott-Richardson	32	30	24.2	.456	.000	.739	5.0	1.3	0.7	0.4	8.8
Nadine Malcolm	31	23	22.7	.425	.411	.871	3.0	0.8	0.4	0.1	8.3
Niele Ivey	32	26	22.1	.373	.357	.933	1.7	2.2	1.0	0.2	3.6
Gordana Grubin	27	9	17.8	.371	.293	.744	1.8	1.2	0.3	0.0	6.3
Alicia Thompson	22	7	17.3	.437	.395	.739	2.9	1.1	0.4	0.3	8.5
Stephanie McCarty	30	0	16.8	.380	.404	.774	1.8	1.9	0.9	0.5	5.6
Monica Maxwell	15	3	15.9	.302	.226	.667	2.5	0.9	0.3	0.3	3.1
Angie Braziel	23	0	14.8	.435	.000	.771	3.3	0.3	0.4	0.6	5.5
Kelly Schumacher	28	5	13.6	.495	.600	.850	2.5	0.4	0.2	1.0	4.0
Danielle McCulley	8	2	11.3	.278	.500	.944	2.1	0.6	0.0	0.3	3.5
Vicki Hall	13	0	9.5	.412	.000	.571	1.2	0.3	0.3	0.0	2.8

^{‡}Waived/Released during the season
^{†}Traded during the season
^{≠}Acquired during the season
