= Niele Ivey =

American basketball player and coach (born 1977)

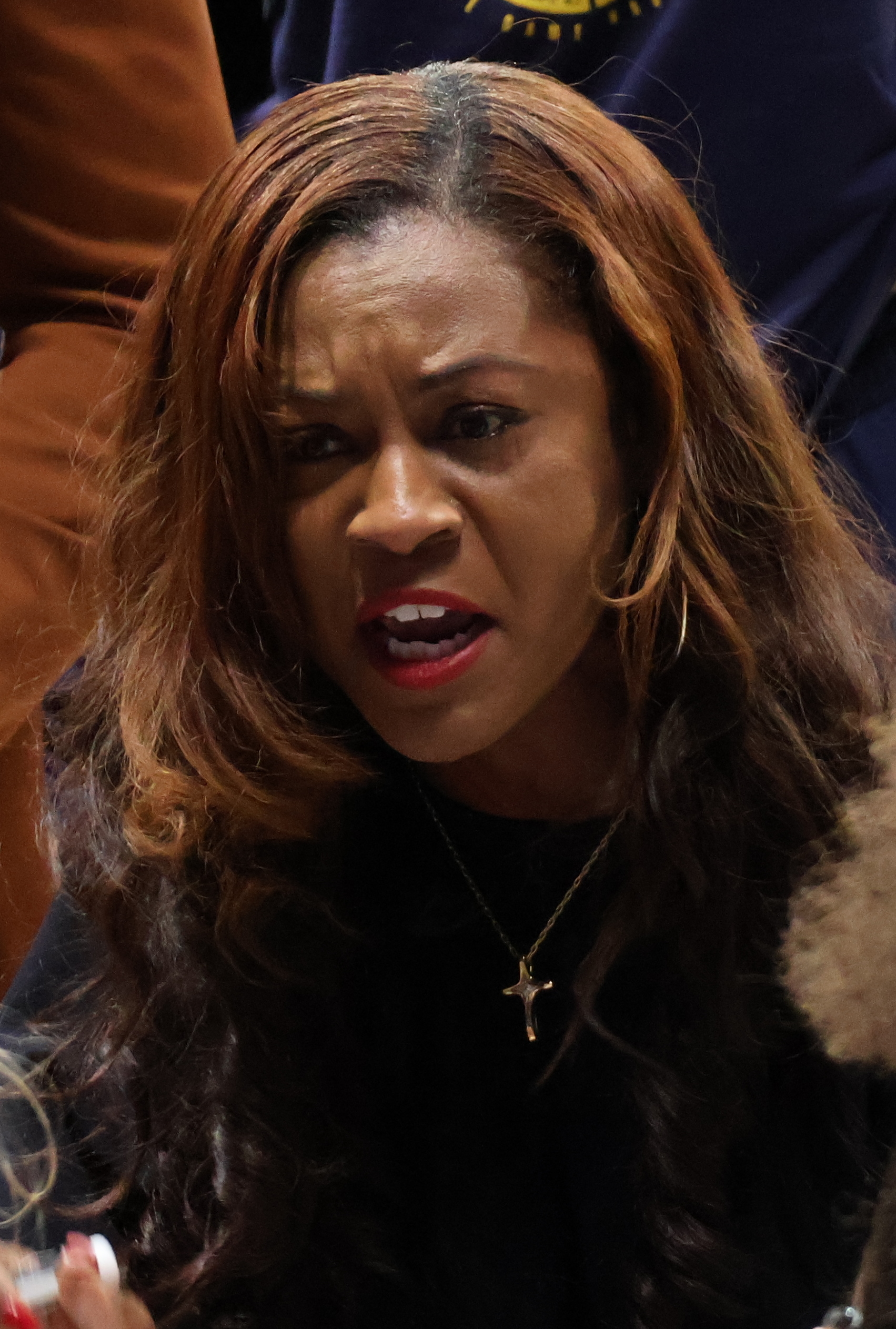
- Ivey with Notre Dame in 2025

Notre Dame Fighting Irish
- Title: Head coach
- League: Atlantic Coast Conference

Personal information
- Born: September 24, 1977 (age 49) St. Louis, Missouri, U.S.
- Listed height: 5 ft 7 in (1.70 m)
- Listed weight: 149 lb (68 kg)

Career information
- High school: Cor Jesu Academy (Affton, Missouri)
- College: Notre Dame (1996–2001)
- WNBA draft: 2001: 2nd round, 19th overall pick
- Drafted by: Indiana Fever
- Playing career: 2001–2005
- Position: Guard
- Number: 33, 11
- Coaching career: 2005–present

Career history

Playing
- 2001–2004: Indiana Fever
- 2005: Phoenix Mercury
- 2005: Detroit Shock

Coaching
- 2005–2007: Xavier (admin. assistant)
- 2007–2015: Notre Dame (assistant)
- 2015–2019: Notre Dame (associate HC)
- 2019–2020: Memphis Grizzlies (assistant)
- 2020–present: Notre Dame

Career highlights
- As player: NCAA champion (2001); Frances Pomeroy Naismith Award (2001); First-team All-Big East (2001); Third-team All-American – AP (2001); Miss Show-Me Basketball (1996); As assistant coach: NCAA champion (2018); As head coach: 2× ACC regular season champion (2023, 2025); ACC Coach of the Year (2023); ACC tournament champion (2024)
- Stats at Basketball Reference

Niele Deirdre Jamillah Viveca Ivey (born September 24, 1977) is an American college basketball coach who is the current head coach for the Notre Dame Fighting Irish women's basketball team. She is a former Women's National Basketball Association (WNBA) player for the Indiana Fever, Detroit Shock, and Phoenix Mercury. Prior to her move to the NBA as an assistant coach for the Memphis Grizzlies in August 2019, she was an assistant coach for the University of Notre Dame women's basketball team, where she played in college. She was an All-American point guard and became the 17th player in school history to record over 1,000 career points. She received the Frances Pomeroy Naismith Award presented for the nation's top player under 5'8" in 2001. She would go on to lead the Irish women to their first NCAA Championship in 2001, in her hometown of St. Louis as a fifth-year senior.

In the WNBA, she finished her career with 408 points, including over 100 in 2 separate seasons. She also had ninety 3-point field goals, 228 assists, and 94 steals.

== High school ==
Ivey grew up playing many sports, but favored basketball. She learned the game from her older brothers, and was shooting from three-point range by the time she was in fourth grade. She attracted attention for her long-range shooting from high school coaches, including Gary Glasscock of Cor Jesu Academy in St. Louis. Ivey had attended Catholic grade school, so it was a natural fit to attend Cor Jesu. As a junior, Ivey scored 18 points per game to help her team to a 31–0 record and a Class 4A State Championship, the first in school history.

== College career ==
Ivey was a big fan of Michael Jordan, who attended college at the University of North Carolina, so she was determined to go there for college. She used her own money to attend a basketball camp in Chapel Hill, but the UNC head coach, Sylvia Hatchell, appeared only at the opening and closing of the camp, and did not get a chance to see Ivey play. Muffet McGraw of Notre Dame became interested in Ivey, and traveled to St. Louis a number of times to watch Ivey play pick-up games at the YMCA in St. Louis. McGraw was prohibited by NCAA rules from talking to recruits at this time, but Ivey was aware of her presence, and it convinced her that McGraw was seriously interested in her. Ivey decided to commit to attend Notre Dame.

== Coaching career ==
Following the retirement of Notre Dame women's coach Muffet McGraw in April 2020, Ivey was named the Fighting Irish head coach.

== Personal life ==
Ivey was born September 24, 1977, in Saint Louis, Missouri, to Thomas and Theresa Ivey. She was the youngest of five children, and the only daughter. She attended Cor Jesu Academy in St. Louis and played at the University of Notre Dame. She has one child, Jaden Ivey, born on February 13, 2002, with former Notre Dame and NFL player Javin Hunter. Jaden played college basketball for Purdue and in 2022 was drafted with the fifth pick of the first round by the Detroit Pistons.

== Head coaching record ==
Record table
Season	Team	Overall	Conference	Standing	Postseason
Notre Dame Fighting Irish (Atlantic Coast Conference) (2020–present)
2020–21	Notre Dame	10–10	8–7	6th	
2021–22	Notre Dame	24–9	13–5	T–3rd	NCAA Sweet Sixteen
2022–23	Notre Dame	27–6	15–3	1st	NCAA Sweet Sixteen
2023–24	Notre Dame	28–7	13–5	T–2nd	NCAA Sweet Sixteen
2024–25	Notre Dame	28–6	16–2	T–1st	NCAA Sweet Sixteen
2025–26	Notre Dame	25–11	12–6	T–5th	NCAA Elite Eight
Notre Dame:		142–49 (.743)	77–28 (.733)		
Total:		142–49 (.743)			
National champion Postseason invitational champion Conference regular season champion Conference regular season and conference tournament champion Division regular season champion Division regular season and conference tournament champion Conference tournament champion

== Career player statistics ==
Legend
GP	Games played	GS	Games started	MPG	Minutes per game	RPG	Rebounds per game
APG	Assists per game	SPG	Steals per game	BPG	Blocks per game	PPG	Points per game
TO	Turnovers per game	FG%	Field-goal percentage	3P%	3-point field-goal percentage	FT%	Free-throw percentage
**Bold**	Career best	°	League leader

*	Denotes season in which Ivey won an NCAA Championship

=== WNBA ===
==== Regular season ====
WNBA regular season statistics
Year	Team	GP	GS	MPG	FG%	3P%	FT%	RPG	APG	SPG	BPG	TO	PPG
2001	Indiana	**32**	**26**	22.1	37.3	35.7	93.3	**1.7**	2.2	1.0	0.2	1.1	3.6
2002	Indiana	31	23	14.2	35.2	38.0	81.0	0.9	1.3	0.5	0.1	0.7	2.8
2003	Indiana	27	21	**24.1**	**38.8**	**39.3**	70.6	1.2	**2.6**	**1.1**	**0.3**	1.0	**5.0**
2004	Indiana	15	1	11.9	29.7	33.3	66.7	0.7	1.2	0.3	0.2	**0.4**	2.3
2005	Detroit	12	0	8.5	21.7	25.0	**1.000**	1.0	0.8	0.5	0.0	**0.4**	1.2
2005	Phoenix	14	0	10.9	33.3	20.0	**1.000**	0.7	1.4	0.4	0.0	**0.4**	1.7
**Career**	5 years, 3 teams	131	71	17.0	35.4	36.0	81.8	1.1	1.7	0.7	0.1	0.8	3.1

==== Playoffs ====
WNBA playoff statistics
Year	Team	GP	GS	MPG	FG%	3P%	FT%	RPG	APG	SPG	BPG	TO	PPG
2003	Indiana	3	0	3.0	0.0	0.0	—	0.3	1.0	0.3	0.0	0.0	0.0
**Career**	1 year, 1 team	3	0	3.0	0.0	0.0	—	0.3	1.0	0.3	0.0	0.0	0.0

=== College ===
NCAA statistics
Year	Team	GP	Points	FG%	3P%	FT%	RPG	APG	SPG	BPG	PPG
1996–97	Notre Dame	5	15	37.5%	0.0%	75.0%	2.4	3.0	1.6	0.2	3.0
1997–98	Notre Dame	31	254	44.9%	37.3%	78.8%	3.4	2.9	2.5	0.2	8.2
1998–99	Notre Dame	28	369	**50.2%**	**44.8%**	**87.0%**	3.8	6.5	2.6	0.0	**13.2**
1999–00	Notre Dame	32	358	43.4%	36.5%	75.3%	3.5	6.1	**3.0**	0.1	11.2
2000–01 *	Notre Dame	**36**	**434**	46.3%	44.2%	71.2%	**4.1**	**6.9**	2.6	**0.2**	12.1
**Career**		132	1430	46.0%	40.5%	77.7%	3.7	5.5	2.6	0.1	10.8
