= Schumacher (disambiguation) =

Schumacher is a German occupational surname.

Schumacher may also refer to:

== Places ==
- Kurt-Schumacher-Platz (Berlin U-Bahn), a Berlin U-Bahn station
- Schumacher (crater), a Moon crater
- Schumacher, Ontario, a community in the Ontario city of Timmins, Canada
- Schumacher College, a college in Devon, England
- 5704 Schumacher, an asteroid

== Organisations ==
- F. Schumacher & Co., an American interior design company
- Schumacher Racing Products, a British radio-controlled car manufacturer

== See also ==
- Schumacher (film), a documentary film about the German Formula One racing driver Michael Schumacher
- Schumaker, a surname and list of people with the surname
- Schuey
- Shoemaker (disambiguation)
