= Shoemaker crater (disambiguation) =

Shoemaker crater may refer to:

- Shoemaker crater (a.k.a. Teague Ring) in Australia
- Shoemaker (lunar crater) at the south pole of the Moon
- Shoemaker crater (433 Eros), a proposed name for an impact feature on the asteroid Eros, now formally named Charlois Regio

== See also ==
- Shoemaker (disambiguation)
