= Rita Williams =

American basketball player (born 1976)

Personal information
- Born: January 14, 1976 (age 50) Norwalk, Connecticut, U.S.
- Listed height: 5 ft 6 in (1.68 m)
- Listed weight: 135 lb (61 kg)

Career information
- High school: Brien McMahon (Norwalk, Connecticut)
- College: Mitchell College (1994–1995); UConn (1995–1998)
- WNBA draft: 1998: 2nd round, 13th overall pick
- Drafted by: Washington Mystics
- Playing career: 1998–2003
- Position: Guard

Career history
- 1998–1999: Washington Mystics
- 2000–2002: Indiana Fever
- 2002: Houston Comets
- 2003: Seattle Storm

Career highlights
- WNBA All-Star (2001); Big East Tournament MOP (1998)

Career WNBA statistics
- Points: 1,185 (6.4 ppg)
- Assists: 405 (2.2 apg)
- Rebounds: 369 (2.0 rpg)
- Stats at Basketball Reference

Rita Williams (born January 14, 1976) is an American former professional basketball player in the Women's National Basketball Association (WNBA). She was the 13th pick in the 1998 WNBA draft, selected by the Washington Mystics. She attended Mitchell College, and played college basketball for the University of Connecticut.

== WNBA career ==
During the 2000 expansion draft on December 15, 1999, Williams was selected by the Indiana Fever.

In the 2000 WNBA season, Williams had the third most steals per game average (2.38). In the 2001 WNBA season, Williams became the first WNBA All-Star in Indiana Fever history.

== Career statistics ==
Legend
GP	Games played	GS	Games started	MPG	Minutes per game	RPG	Rebounds per game
APG	Assists per game	SPG	Steals per game	BPG	Blocks per game	PPG	Points per game
TO	Turnovers per game	FG%	Field-goal percentage	3P%	3-point field-goal percentage	FT%	Free-throw percentage
**Bold**	Career best	°	League leader

=== WNBA ===
==== Regular season ====
WNBA regular season statistics
Year	Team	GP	GS	MPG	FG%	3P%	FT%	RPG	APG	SPG	BPG	TO	PPG
1998	Washington	30°	18	23.7	.323	.218	.633	2.3	2.3	2.1	0.1	2.3	4.4
1999	Washington	31	0	10.1	**.500**	**.559**	.639	1.2	1.0	0.7	0.0	**0.8**	3.4
2000	Indiana	**32**°	**29**	31.7	.409	.374	.731	3.0	3.2	**2.4**	0.1	2.2	11.0
2001	Indiana	**32**°	**29**	**32.6**	.392	.376	**.838**	**3.3**	**3.6**	2.3	**0.3**	3.1	**11.9**
2002	Indiana	20	1	24.2	.289	.254	.735	1.9	2.2	1.1	0.1	1.5	6.0
2002	Houston	9	0	9.4	.455	.333	.700	0.7	0.8	1.2	0.0	1.1	2.1
2003	Seattle	**32**	0	11.9	.373	.256	.733	0.7	1.3	0.4	0.0	**0.8**	2.4
**Career**	6 years, 4 teams	186	77	21.7	.380	.339	.742	2.0	2.2	1.5	0.1	1.8	6.4
**Career**	All-Star	1	0	9.0	.000	.000	—	0.0	1.0	0.0	0.0	0.0	0.0

==== Playoffs ====
WNBA playoff statistics
Year	Team	GP	GS	MPG	FG%	3P%	FT%	RPG	APG	SPG	BPG	TO	PPG
2002	Houston	3	0	23.0	.320	.286	—	2.0	2.3	1.0	0.0	0.3	6.7
**Career**	1 year, 1 team	3	0	23.0	.320	.286	—	2.0	2.3	1.0	0.0	0.3	6.7

=== College ===
College statistics
Year	Team	GP	GS	MPG	FG%	3P%	FT%	RPG	APG	SPG	BPG	TO	PPG
1995–96	Connecticut	30	—	—	.381	.211	.519	1.6	0.8	1.1	0.0	—	2.6
1996–97	Connecticut	34	—	—	.354	.200	.552	**3.7**	3.3	**3.1**	**0.2**	—	7.2
1997–98	Connecticut	**37**	—	—	**.408**	**.353**	**.673**	3.3	**4.0**	2.9	0.1	—	**10.2**
**Career**		101	—	—	.384	.301	.601	2.9	2.8	2.5	0.1	—	6.9

== Personal life ==
Williams earned a degree in sociology from University of Connecticut.

== See also ==
- List of WNBA All-Stars
- List of Connecticut Huskies in the WNBA draft
