= Shoemaker (disambiguation) =

A shoemaker is a person making shoes.

Shoemaker may also refer to:

- Shoemaker (surname)
- NEAR Shoemaker, a NASA mission to study 433 Eros
- The Shoemaker: The Anatomy of a Psychotic (1983) a book about serial killer Joseph Kallinger by Flora Rheta Schreiber.
- The Shoemaker (2011 play) a stageplay written by Susan Charlotte
- 102P/Shoemaker (a.k.a. Shoemaker 1) a comet
- Shoemaker (lunar crater), a lunar impact crater
- Shoemaker (film), a 1996 Canadian drama film
- Shoemaker (song) by Finnish symphonic metal band Nightwish about geologist Eugene Shoemaker

== See also ==
- Shoemaker crater (disambiguation)
- Schumacher (disambiguation), a surname and list of people with the name
- Schumaker, a surname and list of people with the name
- Schoonmaker (disambiguation)
- Yochanan Hasandlar, "The Sandal Maker", Jewish sage of the Second Century AD
- Comet Shoemaker–Levy 9, a comet that crashed into planet Jupiter
