= 2004 Indiana Fever season =

5th season in the WNBA

- Head coach: Brian Winters
- Arena: Conseco Fieldhouse

Results
- Record: 15–19 (.441)
- Place: 6th (Eastern)
- Playoff finish: Did not qualify

The 2004 Indiana Fever season was the franchise's 5th season in the WNBA and their 1st season under head coach, Brian Winters. The Fever failed to improve their record by one game and missed the playoffs due to the strong competitivity in the Eastern Conference. Until the 2017 season, this was the last season that the Fever missed the postseason.

== Offseason ==
=== Dispersal Draft ===
Based on the Fever's 2003 record, they would pick 5th in the Cleveland Rockers dispersal draft. The Fever picked Deanna Jackson.

=== WNBA draft ===
Round	Pick	Player	Nationality	College/School/Team
1	9	Ebony Hoffman (C)	United States	USC
3	31	Ieva Kublina (F/C)	Latvia	Virginia Tech

== Regular season ==
=== Season standings ===
Eastern Conference	W	L	PCT	GB	Home	Road	Conf.
Connecticut Sun ^{x}	18	16	.529	–	10–7	8–9	14–6
New York Liberty ^{x}	18	16	.529	–	11–6	7–10	10–10
Detroit Shock ^{x}	17	17	.500	1.0	8–9	9–8	11–9
Washington Mystics ^{x}	17	17	.500	1.0	11–6	6–11	9–11
Charlotte Sting ^{o}	16	18	.471	2.0	10–7	6–11	8–12
Indiana Fever ^{o}	15	19	.441	3.0	10–7	5–12	8–12

=== Season schedule ===
Date	Opponent	Score	Result	Record
May 21	New York	69–67	Win	1–0
May 23	Washington	67–68	Loss	1–1
May 28	@ Charlotte	41–63	Loss	1–2
June 1	@ San Antonio	79–60	Win	2–2
June 5	Charlotte	70–57	Win	3–2
June 9	Detroit	79–83	Loss	3–3
June 11	@ New York	72–68	Win	4–3
June 12	@ Detroit	68–72	Loss	4–4
June 16	Sacramento	63–50	Win	5–4
June 19	New York	70–65	Win	6–4
June 22	Connecticut	58–63	Loss	6–5
June 25	Los Angeles	71–67	Win	7–5
June 26	@ Charlotte	37–46	Loss	7–6
June 29	@ Detroit	69–68	Win	8–6
July 1	@ Washington	64–69	Loss	8–7
July 3	Phoenix	61–60	Win	9–7
July 6	@ Connecticut	77–79 (OT)	Loss	9–8
July 8	Minnesota	58–56	Win	10–8
July 11	Connecticut	61–65	Loss	10–9
July 14	Houston	70–62	Win	11–9
July 16	Detroit	85–73	Win	12–9
July 19	@ Los Angeles	51–82	Loss	12–10
July 22	@ Seattle	54–59	Loss	12–11
July 24	@ Phoenix	56–71	Loss	12–12
July 25	@ Sacramento	62–71	Loss	12–13
July 28	Charlotte	53–63	Loss	12–14
July 31	@ Houston	54–62	Loss	12–15
September 1	@ Washington	75–58	Win	13–15
September 3	@ Minnesota	69–61	Win	14–15
September 4	Washington	69–42	Win	15–15
September 10	San Antonio	65–82	Loss	15–16
September 13	Seattle	70–76	Loss	15–17
September 16	@ New York	71–77 (OT)	Loss	15–18
September 19	@ Connecticut	60–80	Loss	15–19

== Player stats ==
Player	GP	REB	AST	STL	BLK	PTS
Tamika Catchings	34	249	115	67	38	568
Natalie Williams	34	235	62	40	23	349
Kelly Miller	34	108	106	37	5	348
Deanna Jackson	34	113	53	29	6	236
Kelly Schumacher	32	104	25	10	31	224
Kristen Rasmussen	33	113	47	21	14	152
Coretta Brown	26	34	41	7	1	104
Stephanie White	22	28	52	24	5	91
Ebony Hoffman	30	87	21	15	5	60
Niele Ivey	15	10	18	4	3	34
Kate Starbird	12	9	11	6	0	20
Astou Ndiaye-Diatta	10	11	4	1	3	12
