= Kelly Schumacher =

American-born Canadian basketball and volleyball player

Kelly Schumacher-Raimon
Personal information
- Born: October 14, 1977 (age 49) Cincinnati, Ohio, U.S.
- Listed height: 6 ft 5 in (1.96 m)
- Listed weight: 180 lb (82 kg)

Career information
- High school: Pontiac (Shawville, Quebec); John Abbott College (Sainte-Anne-de-Bellevue, Quebec)
- College: UConn (1997–2001)
- WNBA draft: 2001: 1st round, 14th overall pick
- Drafted by: Indiana Fever
- Playing career: 2001–2009
- Position: Assistant coach
- Coaching career: 2018–present

Career history

Playing
- 2001–2005: Indiana Fever
- 2006: New York Liberty
- 2007: Phoenix Mercury
- 2008–2009: Detroit Shock

Coaching
- 2018–2020: Las Vegas Aces (assistant)
- 2020–2021: New York Liberty (assistant)
- 2021–2022: Dallas Wings (assistant)

Career highlights
- 2× WNBA champion (2007, 2008); NCAA champion (2000)
- Stats at Basketball Reference
Medals
Women's basketball
Representing United States
Jones Cup
| Gold medal – first place | 2000 Taipei | Team competition |

Kelly Schumacher (born October 14, 1977) is an American-born Canadian professional basketball player and professional volleyball player. She had been playing in the WNBA for the Detroit Shock, until her release 18 June 2009.

After her junior season at the University of Connecticut, she competed with USA Basketball as a member of the gold medal-winning Jones Cup Team that compiled a 4–0 record in Taipei. In her professional career she plays in Spanish League in Arranz Burgos, Perfumerías Avenida and now in UB F.C.Barcelona. She is currently playing professional beach volleyball on the AVP Tour.

== Awards and achievements ==
- She has appeared in more games (159) than any player in Fever history.
- Fever's starting power forward in first 14 games of 2005.
- Second all-time in career blocked shots for the Fever.
- Played a career-high 39 minutes during an overtime game played at Radio City Music Hall in New York, September 16, 2004.
- Pro career highs of 22 points and nine rebounds in an 81–57 win over San Antonio, July 23, 2003.
- Finished her career at Connecticut ranked third all-time in career blocked shots with 181.
- Set NCAA Women's Final Four record with nine blocked shots as Connecticut defeated Tennessee for the 2000 national championship.
- Played a career-high 39 minutes during an overtime game played at Radio City Music Hall in New York, September 16, 2004.
- She is the Indiana Fever's career leader in blocked shots
- She has appeared in more games than any other player in Indiana Fever history
- She recorded 717 points during her collegiate career at the University of Connecticut
- She has been voted MVP in basketball, volleyball and soccer
- She was a member of gold medal-winning 2000 USA Jones Cup team
- She was a member of the CCAA national championship team 1996, 1997
- She is ranked sixteenth in the WNBA, with 0.8 blocks per game
- She had won the Spanish female league and the cup of queen with "Perfumerias Avenida de Salamanca" [2005-2006]
- On February 23, 2006, she was traded to the New York Liberty
- Before the 2007 season, she was traded again to the Phoenix Mercury

== Biography ==
Born in Cincinnati, Ohio but raised in Canada She was a communications science major at the University of Connecticut. She plays the violin and lists her favorite on-court moment as winning the 2000 NCAA National Championship. Her nickname is 'Schuey' or 'schu'.

At age 23, Schumacher was selected by the Indiana Fever in the first round (14th overall) of the WNBA draft on April 20, 2001.

== USA Basketball ==
Schumacher was named to the team representing the US in 2000 at the William Jones Cup competition in Taipei, Taiwan. The USA team started strong with a 32-point win over the host team, the Republic of China National Team. They then beat South Korea easily and faced Japan in the third game. Japan started out strongly, and had an 18-point lead in the first half. The USA then out scored Japan 23–3 to take a small lead at the half. The USA built a ten-point lead, but Japan cut it back to three with under a minute to go. Kelly Schumacher grabbed an offensive rebound and scored to bring the lead back to five points and the team held on for the win. Schumacher had 24 points to help the USA team beat Japan 83–80. The final game was against Malaysia, but it wasn't close, with the USA winning 79–24, to secure a 4–0 record for the competition and the gold medal. Schumacher tied Camille Cooper for the team rebounding lead with 7.3 rebounds per game.

== Professional career ==
After playing professional volleyball, Schumacher is returning to basketball, signing with the Spanish professional team Rivas Ecópolis

== Career statistics ==
Legend
| GP | Games played | GS | Games started | MPG | Minutes per game | RPG | Rebounds per game |
| APG | Assists per game | SPG | Steals per game | BPG | Blocks per game | PPG | Points per game |
| TO | Turnovers per game | FG% | Field-goal percentage | 3P% | 3-point field-goal percentage | FT% | Free-throw percentage |
| **Bold** | Career best | ° | League leader |

| † | Denotes season(s) in which Schumacher won a WNBA championship |
| * | Denotes season(s) in which Schumacher won an NCAA Championship |

=== WNBA ===
==== Regular season ====
WNBA regular season statistics
| Year | Team | GP | GS | MPG | FG% | 3P% | FT% | RPG | APG | SPG | BPG | TO | PPG |
|---|---|---|---|---|---|---|---|---|---|---|---|---|---|
| 2001 | Indiana | 28 | 5 | 13.6 | 49.5 | **60.0** | 85.0 | 2.5 | 0.4 | 0.2 | 1.0 | 0.8 | 4.0 |
| 2002 | Indiana | 31 | 1 | 11.4 | **50.6** | 0.0 | 69.2 | 1.9 | 0.4 | 0.2 | 0.7 | 0.7 | 3.5 |
| 2003 | Indiana | **34** | 1 | 14.1 | 47.9 | 44.4 | 85.2 | 2.9 | 0.6 | 0.2 | 0.7 | 0.9 | 5.6 |
| 2004 | Indiana | 32 | 7 | 18.8 | 46.9 | 38.5 | 77.8 | 3.3 | 0.8 | 0.3 | 1.0 | 1.6 | 7.0 |
| 2005 | Indiana | **34** | 14 | 15.2 | 42.0 | 18.2 | 81.0 | 2.0 | 0.4 | 0.3 | 0.7 | 1.0 | 4.0 |
| 2006 | New York | 21 | **21** | **25.7** | 41.1 | 25.0 | 71.4 | **5.5** | **1.1** | 0.1 | **1.2** | 1.7 | **7.8** |
| 2007^{†} | Phoenix | **34** | 0 | 16.0 | 45.6 | 42.9 | 73.9 | 4.3 | 0.4 | **0.5** | 0.7 | 1.0 | 4.4 |
| 2008^{†} | Detroit | 7 | 0 | 12.7 | 37.5 | 0.0 | **100.0** | 2.9 | 0.7 | 0.3 | 0.4 | 1.1 | 2.0 |
| 2009 | Detroit | 1 | 0 | 10.0 | — | — | — | 0.0 | 0.0 | 0.0 | 1.0 | **0.0** | 0.0 |
| **Career** | 9 years, 4 teams | 222 | 49 | 15.8 | 45.8 | 33.9 | 76.4 | 3.1 | 0.5 | 0.3 | 0.8 | 1.1 | 4.9 |

==== Playoffs ====
WNBA playoff statistics
| Year | Team | GP | GS | MPG | FG% | 3P% | FT% | RPG | APG | SPG | BPG | TO | PPG |
|---|---|---|---|---|---|---|---|---|---|---|---|---|---|
| 2002 | Indiana | 3 | 0 | **17.3** | **65.0** | **100.0** | 50.0 | 3.0 | **1.0** | 0.0 | 0.7 | 0.7 | **10.7** |
| 2005 | Indiana | 4 | 0 | 10.5 | 47.4 | — | **100.0** | 2.0 | 0.5 | **0.5** | **1.0** | **0.0** | 5.0 |
| 2007^{†} | Phoenix | **9** | 0 | 13.1 | 16.1 | — | 50.0 | **3.2** | 0.3 | 0.4 | 0.9 | 0.6 | 1.2 |
| 2008^{†} | Detroit | 8 | 0 | 11.9 | 43.8 | 0.0 | — | 3.0 | 0.4 | 0.1 | 0.4 | 0.4 | 1.8 |
| **Career** | 4 years, 3 teams | 24 | 0 | 12.8 | 39.5 | 50.0 | 58.3 | 2.9 | 0.5 | 0.3 | 0.7 | 0.4 | 3.2 |

=== College ===
Kelly Schumacher Statistics at University of Connecticut
| Year | G | FG | FGA | PCT | 3FG | 3FGA | PCT | FT | FTA | PCT | REB | AVG | A | TO | B | S | MIN | PTS | AVG |
| 1997–98 | 35 | 70 | 117 | 0.598 | 0 | 0 | 0.000 | 37 | 70 | 0.529 | 103 | 2.9 | 19 | 29 | 38 | 11 | 408 | 177 | 5.1 |
| 1998–99 | 31 | 63 | 113 | 0.558 | 0 | 0 | 0.000 | 46 | 70 | 0.657 | 130 | 4.2 | 16 | 24 | 37 | 12 | 356 | 172 | 5.5 |
| 1999–00* | 37 | 80 | 144 | 0.556 | 0 | 0 | 0.000 | 26 | 38 | 0.684 | 141 | 3.8 | 27 | 27 | 65 | 21 | 577 | 186 | 5.0 |
| 2000–01 | 29 | 75 | 143 | 0.524 | 2 | 9 | 0.222 | 30 | 39 | 0.769 | 126 | 4.3 | 28 | 24 | 41 | 11 | 491 | 182 | 6.3 |
| Totals | 132 | 288 | 517 | 0.557 | 2 | 9 | 0.222 | 139 | 217 | 0.641 | 500 | 3.8 | 90 | 104 | 181 | 55 | 1832 | 717 | 5.4 |
