= Jurgita Štreimikytė =

Lithuanian basketball player (born 1972)

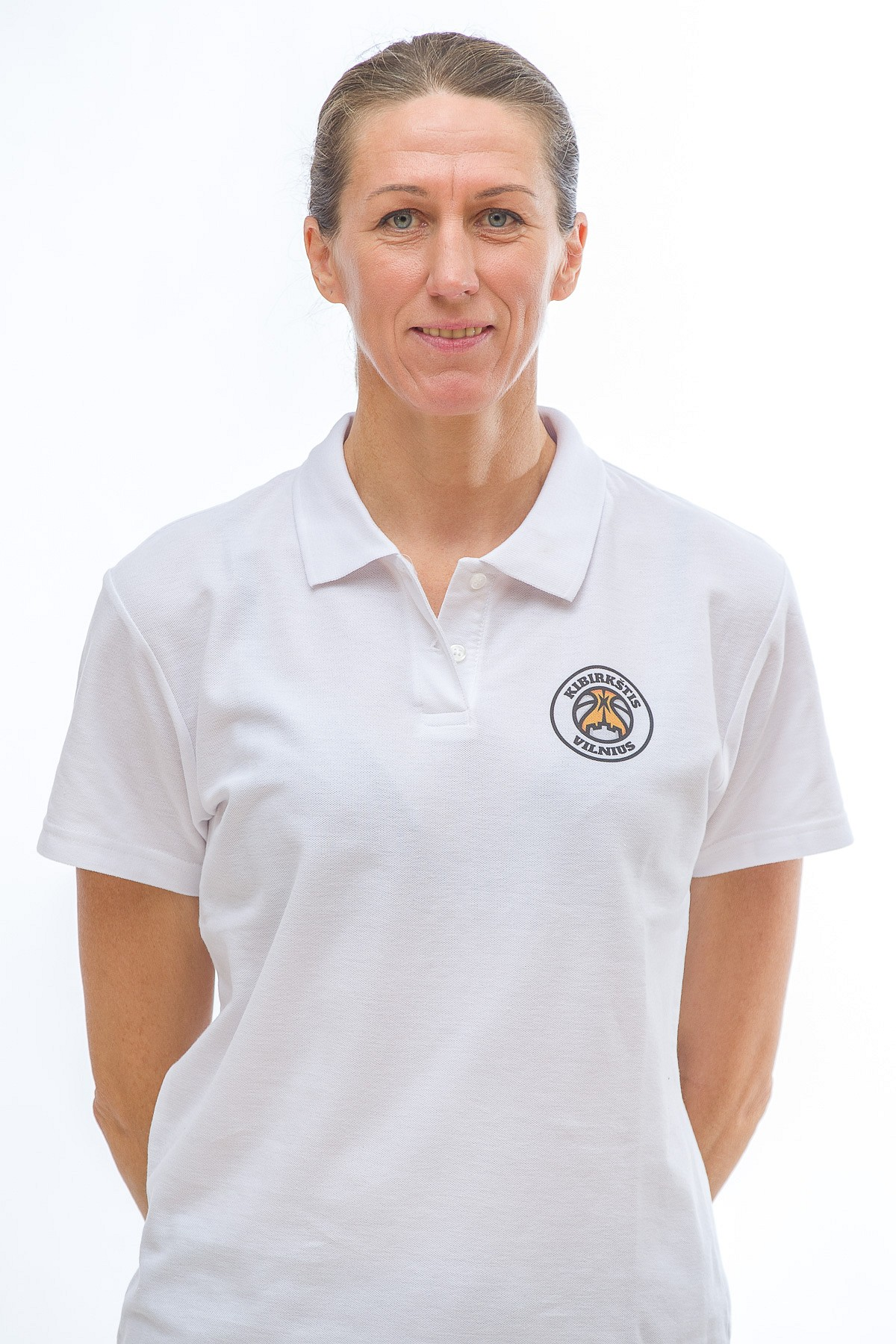

Personal information
- Born: 14 May 1972 (age 54) Alytus, Lithuania
- Listed height: 6 ft 2 in (1.88 m)
- Listed weight: 165 lb (75 kg)

Career information
- WNBA draft: 2000: 2nd round, 26th overall pick
- Drafted by: Indiana Fever
- Playing career: ?–2010
- Position: Small forward

Career history
- ?–1994 2003–2010: Kaunas
- 1994–1998: Valenciennes Olympic
- 1998–2003: Comense
- 2000–2001: Indiana Fever
- 2004: Sopron
- 2005: Indiana Fever
- 2009: Spartak Vidnoye

Career highlights
- Euroleague Women champion (2009)
- Stats at Basketball Reference
- FIBA Hall of Fame

Jurgita Štreimikytė (born 14 May 1972 in Alytus, Lithuania) is a Lithuanian former basketball forward who played the WNBA for Indiana Fever and the Euroleague Women with Kaunas, Valenciennes Olympic and SG Comense among others. She was a member of the Lithuanian national team, winning the 1997 Eurobasket. She retired from international basketball following the 2006 World Championship.

After retiring in 2010, she currently serves as Kaunas' second coach.

On 30 November 2022, she was inducted to the FIBA Hall of Fame in appreciation of her stunning career contributions.

Štreimikytė's husband is Dainius Virbickas, 1996 Olympic Lithuanian long-distance runner. They have one son.
