= Indiana Fever =

Women's National Basketball Association franchise based in Indianapolis, Indiana

- 2026 Indiana Fever season
- Conference: Eastern
- Leagues: WNBA
- Founded: 2000
- History: Indiana Fever; 2000–present
- Arena: Gainbridge Fieldhouse
- Location: Indianapolis, Indiana
- Team colors: Red, blue, gold
- Main sponsor: Salesforce
- President: Vacant
- General manager: Vacant
- Head coach: Stephanie White
- Assistants: Briann January; Karima Christmas-Kelly; Austin Kelly
- Ownership: Herb Simon
- Championships: 1 (2012)
- Conference titles: 3 (2009, 2012, 2015) (Note: The WNBA awarded conference championships to the winners of the Conference Finals in the playoffs from 1998 to 2015.)
- Commissioner's Cup titles: 1 (2025)
- Retired numbers: 1 (24)
- Website: fever.wnba.com
Heroine	Explorer	Rebel

The Indiana Fever are an American professional basketball team based in Indianapolis. The Fever compete in the Women's National Basketball Association (WNBA) as a member of the Eastern Conference. The team was founded for the 2000 WNBA season. The team is owned by Herb Simon, the founder of Simon Property Group.

The Fever have qualified for the WNBA playoffs in 14 of its 25 seasons in Indiana. In 2009, the Fever reached the WNBA Finals but fell short to the Phoenix Mercury in game 5. In 2012, the Fever won the WNBA Finals with a 3–1 series victory over the Minnesota Lynx. Tamika Catchings was named the 2012 Finals MVP. In 2015, the Fever again reached the WNBA Finals but fell short to Minnesota in game 5.

Some of the players who have helped define the history of the Fever include Tamika Catchings, Katie Douglas, Briann January, Natalie Williams, Yolanda Griffith, Shavonte Zellous, Tully Bevilaqua, Tammy Sutton-Brown, Natasha Howard, Candice Dupree, Cappie Pondexter, Erica Wheeler, Kelsey Mitchell, Lexie Hull, Aliyah Boston, and Caitlin Clark.

== History ==
=== 2000: Early beginnings ===
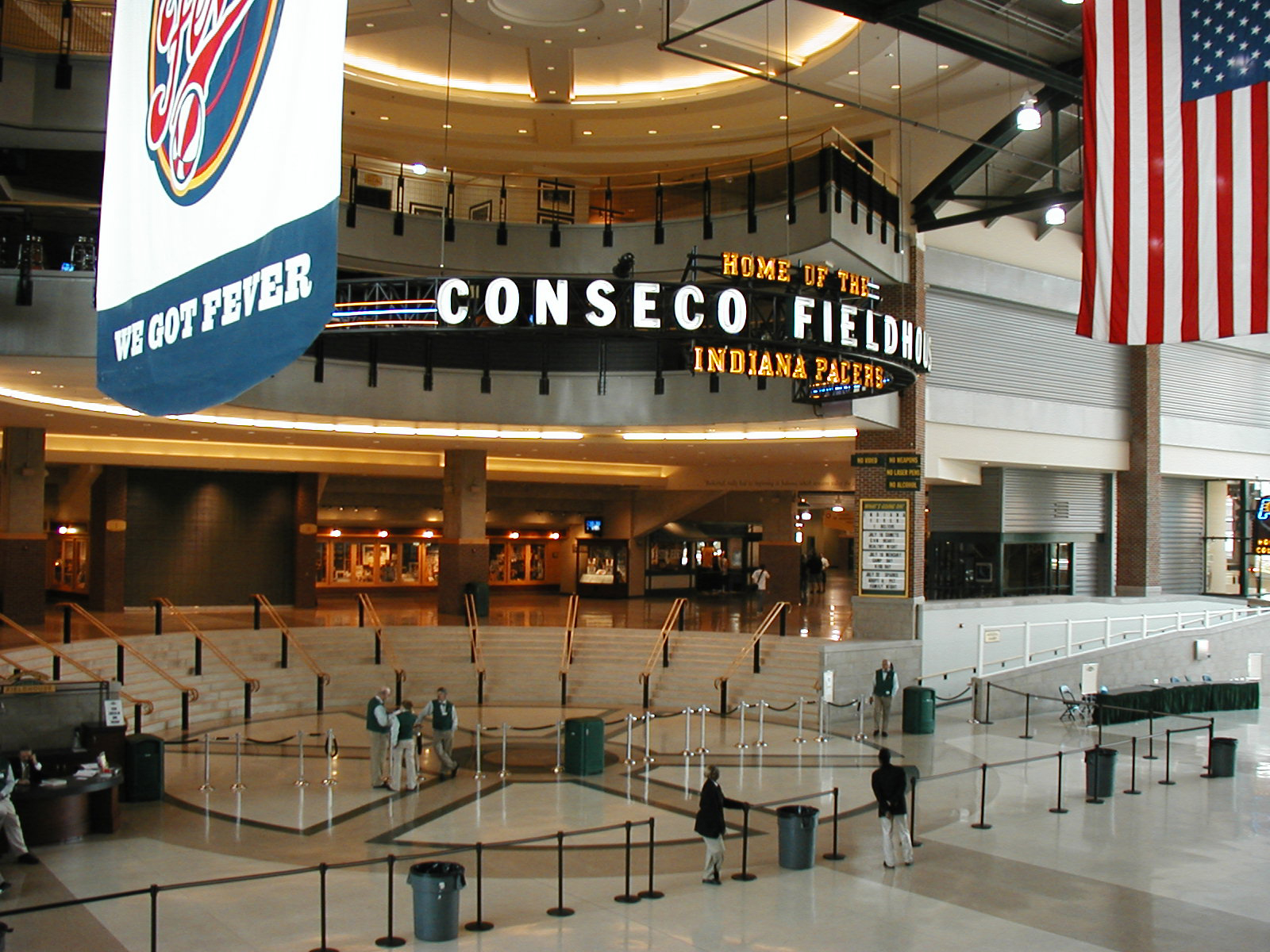
Lobby of Gainbridge Fieldhouse

The Indiana Fever team was founded in 2000 following the WNBA's announcement on June 7, 1999, of four locations, including Indiana, having been granted an expansion franchise to coincide with the opening of Gainbridge Fieldhouse (then Conseco Fieldhouse). Notably, the Fever's launch campaign was accompanied with the slogan "In 49 states it's just basketball, but this is Indiana," which has become a popular catchphrase regarding the sport's popularity in the state. The league held an expansion draft for the Fever, Miami Sol, Portland Fire, and Seattle Storm on December 15, 1999.

In their first two seasons, they were coached by women's basketball legends Anne Donovan and Nell Fortner. Led by center Kara Wolters, the team posted a 9–23 record in their inaugural campaign.

=== 2001–2016: Tamika Catchings era ===
The Fever drafted University of Tennessee star Tamika Catchings in the 2001 WNBA Draft. The Fever went into the year with high expectations of a playoff berth, but Catchings tore her ACL during a college game and missed the entire WNBA season. The Fever posted a 10–22 record in 2001.

After missing the entire 2001 season, the 2002 season proved to be the breakout season for Tamika Catchings and the Fever. Catchings came out strong and became one of the most versatile players in the WNBA, easily winning Rookie of the Year honors as well as making the WNBA All-Star team. Her team competed well all year and posted a respectable 16–16 record, tying for the final playoff spot with the Orlando Miracle. Indiana won the tiebreaker and earned their first playoff appearance in franchise history. They drew the #1 seed in the playoffs, the Liberty; with the Fever losing two games to one.

The 2002–2003 offseason brought a lot of change for the Fever. The team added Olympian Natalie Williams and Charlotte Sting star Kelly Miller before the 2003 season. During the offseason, the original coach and GM, Nell Fortner, resigned. Kelly Krauskopf replaced Fortner as GM and immediately hired Brian Winters to be the head coach. On May 29, 2003, the Fever registered their first sellout of 18,345 and defeated the Washington Mystics on national television. The team did better under the new coaching, but missed the playoffs, posting a 16–18 record.

The 2004 campaign was very similar to 2003's. The Fever finished with a 15–19 record. They missed the playoffs by one game in the Eastern Conference.

==== 2005–2007: Playoffs debut ====
In 2005, the Fever had their best season since joining the league, posting a 21–13 record and making the playoffs for just the second time. In the first round, the Fever swept the New York Liberty two games to none, earning their first playoff series victory in franchise history. In the Eastern Conference Finals, the Fever faced the heavily favored Connecticut Sun. Game 1 came down to the final seconds when Katie Douglas hit a crucial three to win the game for the Sun. Game 2 went into overtime, with the Sun winning, thus sweeping the Fever two games to none.

In the 2005–2006 offseason, the Fever acquired All-Star Anna DeForge from the Phoenix Mercury in exchange for Kelly Miller. Later that offseason, the Fever made another All-Star addition by signing free agent Tamika Whitmore from the Los Angeles Sparks. In the 2006 WNBA draft they selected athletic swing-forward La'Tangela Atkinson from the North Carolina Tar Heels along with Kasha Terry from the Georgia Tech Yellow Jackets.

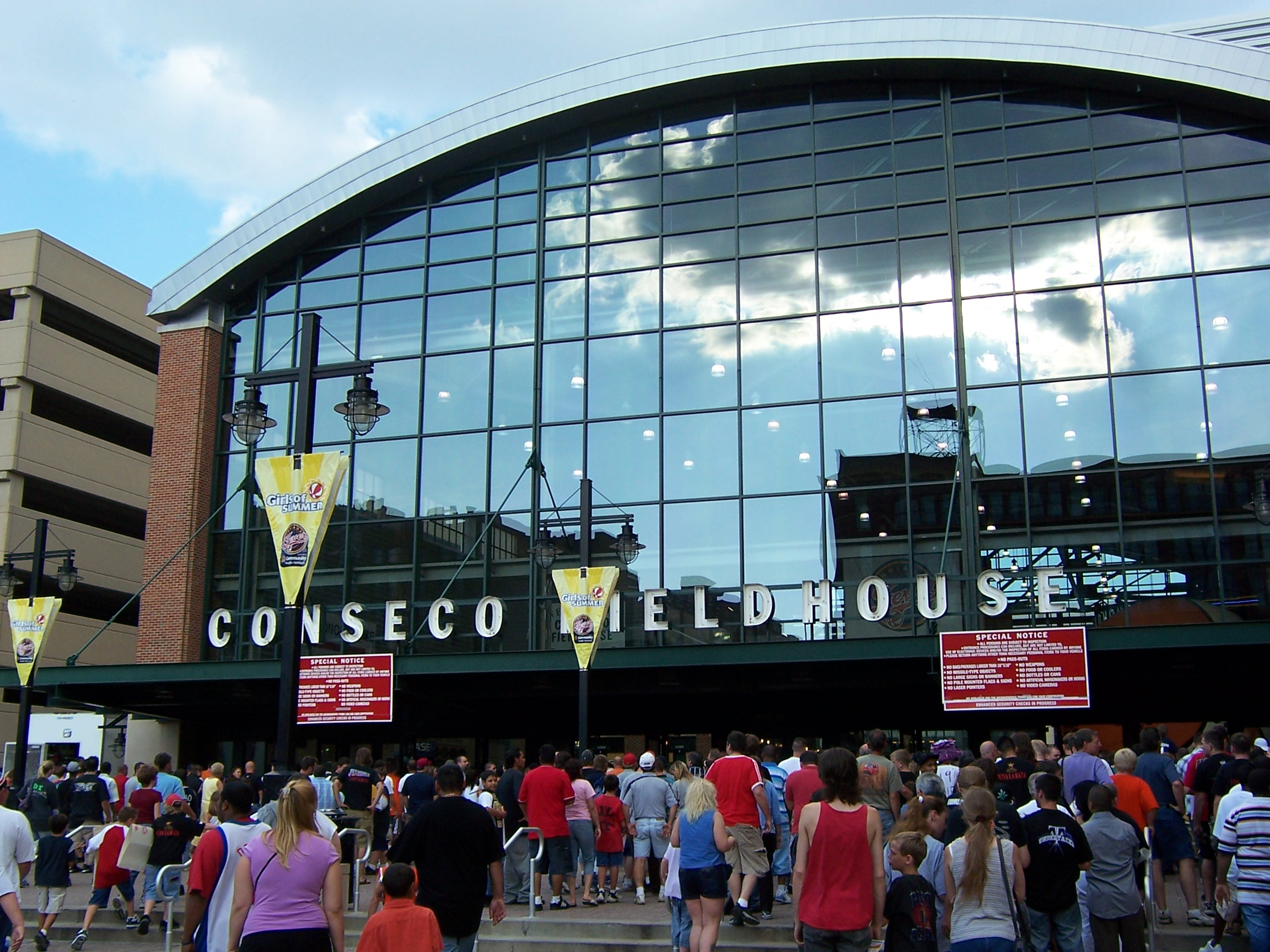
Outside Gainbridge Fieldhouse, home of the Fever

The Fever started the 2006 season off at 4–0 and jumped out to an early lead in the Eastern Conference standings. Teammates Tamika Catchings and Tully Bevilaqua led the league in steals, first and second, respectively, the first time teammates led the league in one statistical category. The Fever posted a 21–13 record, making the playoffs for the second year in a row. In the first round, the Fever faced archrival Detroit. Detroit won Game 1 in Indianapolis and held a one-game-to-nothing lead in the series. Game 2 in Detroit was a high-scoring affair with Tamika Whitmore scoring a WNBA Playoff record 41 points. Detroit won in the end, 98–83, and won the series two games to none.

Going into the 2006–2007 off-season, the Fever looked to improve their post play. In the Dispersal Draft, the Fever added veteran forward Sheri Sam from the Charlotte Sting. Kelly Krauskopf and the front office then set their eyes on key Free Agent Center Tammy Sutton-Brown, signing her on March 22, 2007. The Fever also selected 6–7 center Alison Bales from Duke University in the 2007 WNBA draft to go along with Sutton-Brown.

Going into the 2007 season, the Fever had their eyes set on the WNBA Finals. They started the season strong, winning 16 of their first 20 games, the best 20-game start in Eastern Conference history. Then, on July 20, key player Tamika Catchings injured her foot, causing her to miss the rest of the regular season. The injury was later revealed as a partial tear of her plantar fascia. The Fever finished 5–9 without Catchings. They won the #2 seed in the Eastern Conference Playoffs, beating out the Connecticut Sun. They played the same Sun team in the first round of the playoffs. Game 1 in Connecticut was an epic battle, going into three overtimes, with the Sun hanging on to win 93–88. The Fever won Game 2 at home by double digits, forcing a decisive Game 3. In game 3, the Fever found themselves down by 22 points late halfway through the 3rd quarter. The Fever battled back to win Game 3 in overtime by the same score as Game 1, 93–88. The 22-point comeback was the largest comeback in WNBA Playoff history. In the Eastern Conference Finals, the Fever played their other hated rival, the Detroit Shock. The Fever grabbed an early lead in the series, winning Game 1 at Conseco Fieldhouse. With the team just 1 game away from the WNBA Finals the Fever traveled to Detroit. In Game 2, the game was close until the 2nd quarter, when the Shock blew it wide open with a 14–0 run and easily won. With a spot in the Finals up for grabs in Game 3, the Fever started off the game with an early 17–3 lead. Then late in the first half Catchings went down with another injury; she had completely torn her Achilles tendon. The Shock ended up winning Game 3, 85–61.

==== 2008: Head coach shakeup ====
On October 26, 2007, the Fever announced that they declined the option for head coach Brian Winters, ending his four-year tenure in charge. He compiled a 78–58 regular season record with a 5–7 playoff record. On December 12, 2007, assistant coach Lin Dunn was named his successor as head coach.

In one of the biggest trades in WNBA history, the Fever traded Tamika Whitmore and their first-round pick in the 2008 WNBA draft for Indianapolis native, Katie Douglas on February 19, 2008.

The Fever were part of the Liberty Outdoor Classic, which was the first regular-season professional basketball game played outdoors. It was played between the Fever and New York Liberty at Arthur Ashe Stadium in Flushing, New York on July 19, 2008, with the Fever winning the game, 71–55.

During the 2008 season, the Fever struggled in comparison to the three previous seasons. They finished with a 17–17 record, good for fourth place in the playoffs. Meeting the Detroit Shock in the first round, the Fever lost in three games.

==== 2009–2012: Championship season ====
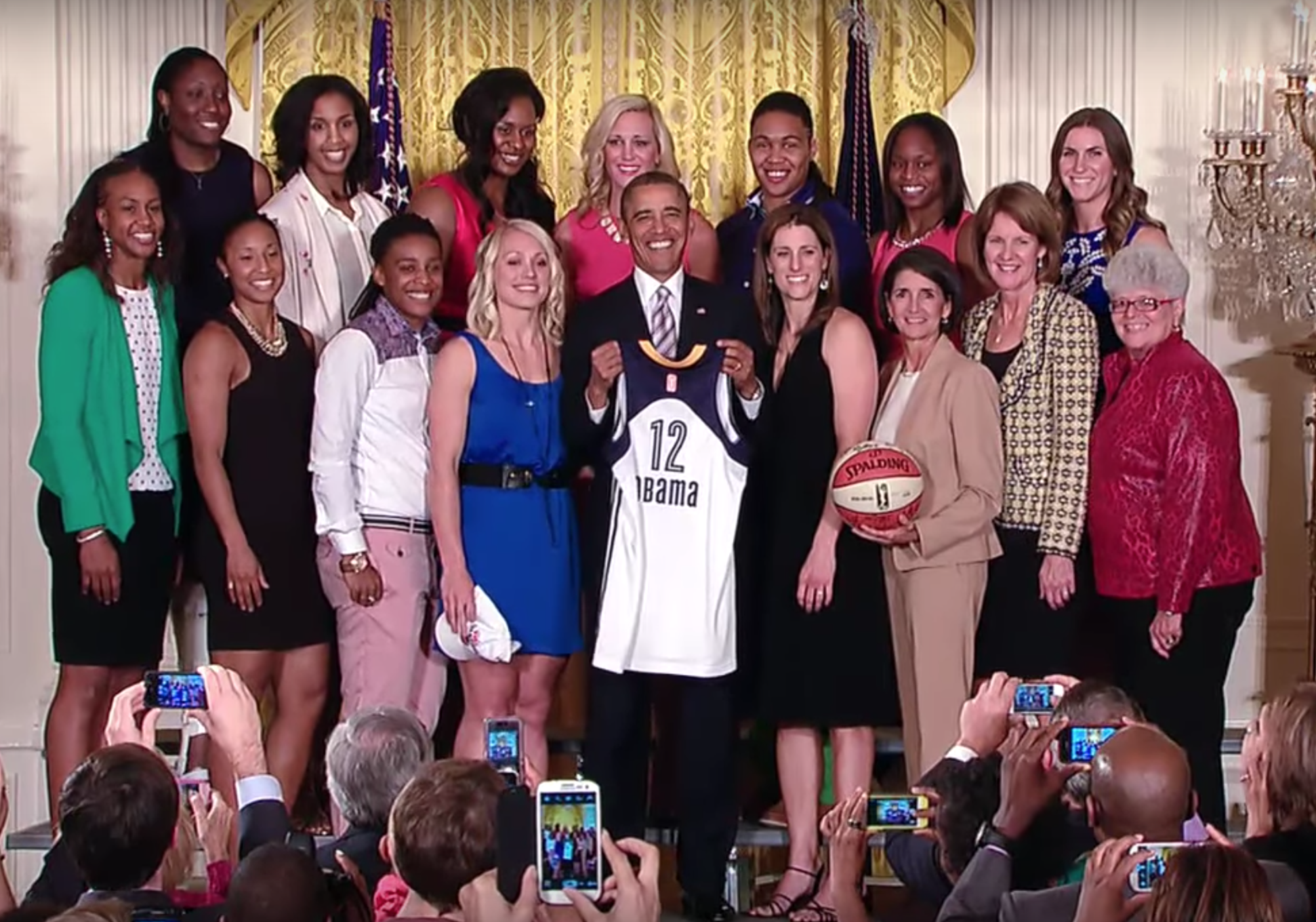
The Indiana Fever in 2013, visiting the White House upon winning their first WNBA championship.

After a disappointing 2008 season, the Fever were looking to improve in 2009. Indiana Pacers owners had said the Fever have been losing money. The only thing to save the Fever from folding in the near future, the owners inferred, was for the Fever to be successful on the court and at the box office. The Fever took the owners' ultimatum to heart and reached the playoffs as the No. 1 seed in the Eastern Conference with a franchise-best 22–12 record. In the first round, the Fever ousted the Washington Mystics in a sweep, marking their return to the conference finals. In the East finals, again facing their rival Detroit Shock, they reached their first ever WNBA Finals by defeating the Shock in three games. The Fever then lost in 5 games to the Phoenix Mercury in the WNBA Finals.

Because of the success in 2009, the Fever announced they would remain in Indianapolis for 2010. Their 2011 season in Indianapolis was also confirmed as well.

In 2012, the Fever advanced to the 2012 WNBA Finals. Indiana then defeated the Minnesota Lynx, 3 games to 1. It was the Fever's first WNBA title.

==== 2012–2016: Catchings' final years ====
After the Fever won the 2012 WNBA championship, the ownership group took notice of their management by promoting general manager Kelly Krauskopf to president of the franchise. Krauskopf was given additional duties within the franchise as well as a pay increase. The Fever competed for another title in 2015, reaching the finals for the third time in franchise history, but fell short, losing to the Minnesota Lynx in five games. In 2016, the Fever made it to the playoffs for the 12th consecutive time (the current WNBA record for most consecutive playoff appearances by a team). However, the Fever were upset in the first round elimination game against the Phoenix Mercury after the league's new playoff format was in effect. This game also marked the final game of Tamika Catchings's playing career; she had been known as the Fever's franchise player since 2002.

=== 2016–2023: Rebuilding ===
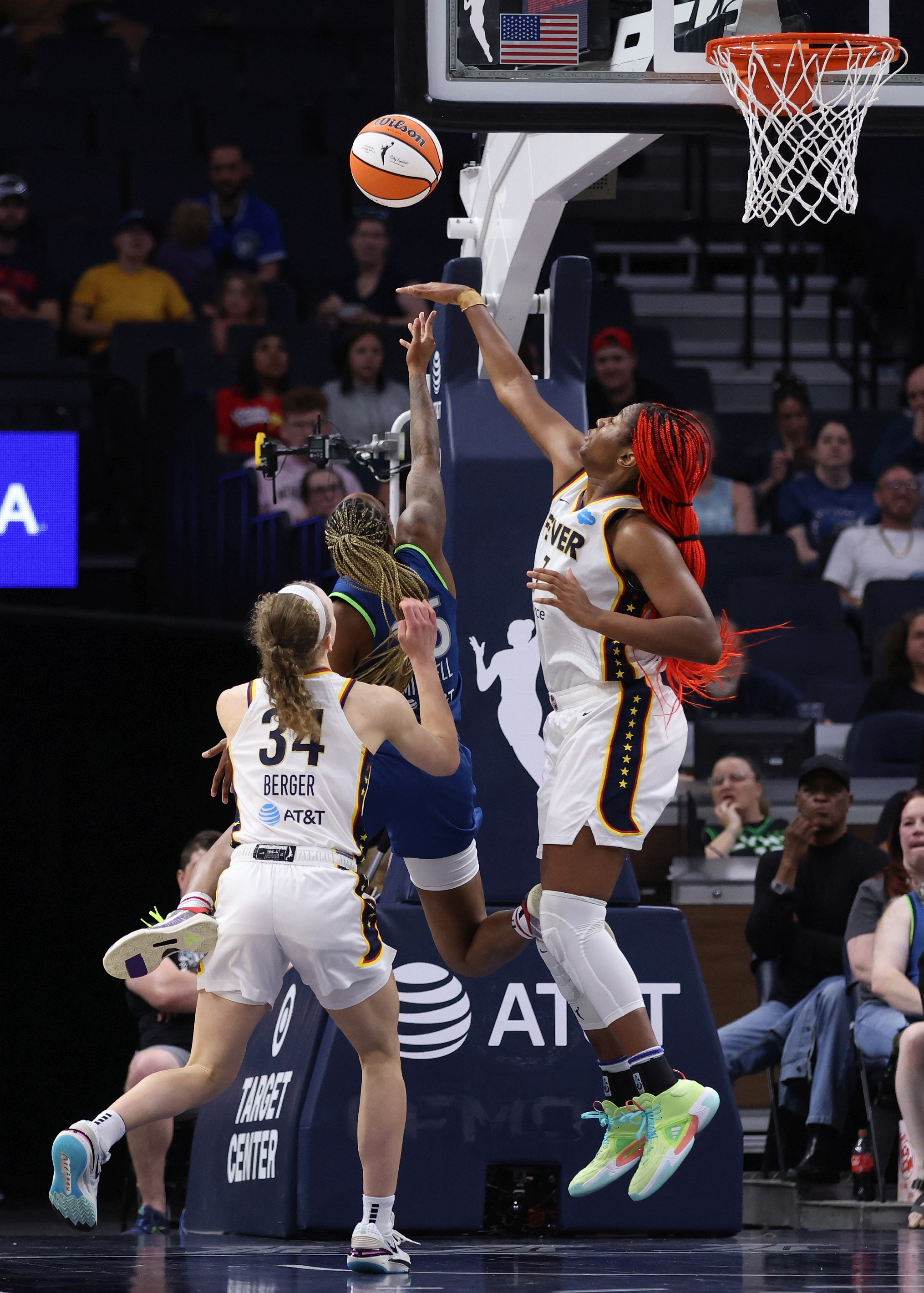
The Indiana Fever versus the Minnesota Lynx on June 9, 2023 with Aliyah Boston blocking Tiffany Mitchell.

On November 18, 2016, the Fever announced Pokey Chatman as their new head coach. In February 2017, they traded for five-time all-star Candice Dupree along with the Mercury's 2017 first-round pick in a three-team deal that sent Camille Little and Jillian Alleyne to the Mercury and the Connecticut Sun receiving the 8th overall pick in the 2017 WNBA draft along with Lynetta Kizer from the Fever. Despite acquiring a veteran all-star forward and a new head coach, the Fever would have one of the most disappointing seasons in franchise history. On August 12, 2017, the Fever were defeated 111–52 by the Minnesota Lynx, the largest margin of defeat in WNBA history, and allowed a league record 37–0 scoring run. The Fever finished with the second-worst record in the league of 9–25 in their first season after Catchings's retirement, ending a streak of 12 consecutive playoff seasons.

Disappointment continued for the rebuilding Fever in 2018, as they finished in last place with a 6–28 record. On March 4, 2019, Pacers Sports & Entertainment announced Allison Barber, as the new president and chief operating officer of the Fever, while Catchings was named vice president of Fever Basketball Operations. They wound up with the third selection in the 2019 WNBA draft, selecting Teaira McCowan from Mississippi State. The 2019 season saw some improvement, and the team finished 13–21, two games out of the playoffs. After the season, coach and general manager Pokey Chatman was fired.

On November 27, 2019, Marianne Stanley was introduced as the head coach of the Indiana Fever, making her the seventh coach in the franchise's 20-year WNBA history. In addition, it was also announced that Catchings would be promoted to general manager.

Near the end of the 2019 season, the Fever announced that they would move their home games to Butler University's Hinkle Fieldhouse for the 2020 and 2021 seasons, plus at least part of the 2022 season, to accommodate renovations of Bankers Life Fieldhouse. The team planned to return to the renamed Gainbridge Fieldhouse upon project completion. However, the 2020 WNBA season was played in IMG Academy in Bradenton, Florida, due to the COVID-19 pandemic. For the 2021 season, the Fever played their first four home games at Bankers Life Fieldhouse before playing the remaining home games at Indiana Farmers Coliseum.

On February 14, 2022, Tamika Catchings stepped down as the vice president of basketball operations and general manager of the Indiana Fever.

On February 24, 2022, former Fever coach Lin Dunn, who guided the team to a WNBA title in 2012, was introduced as the franchise's interim general manager and senior advisor for Fever basketball operations.

The franchise generally struggled in 2022 and 2023, earning the top WNBA draft pick after both seasons. In 2023, the Fever chose South Carolina's Aliyah Boston with the number one pick; the next season, amidst the increasing popularity of collegiate women's basketball, the Fever chose Iowa's Caitlin Clark first overall. Drafting Clark led to a surge of interest in the team and the WNBA in general, with TV ratings for the 2024 WNBA draft (at 2.5 million) surpassing the combined TV ratings for actual games played over the prior 25 seasons.

=== 2024–present: The Caitlin Clark era ===
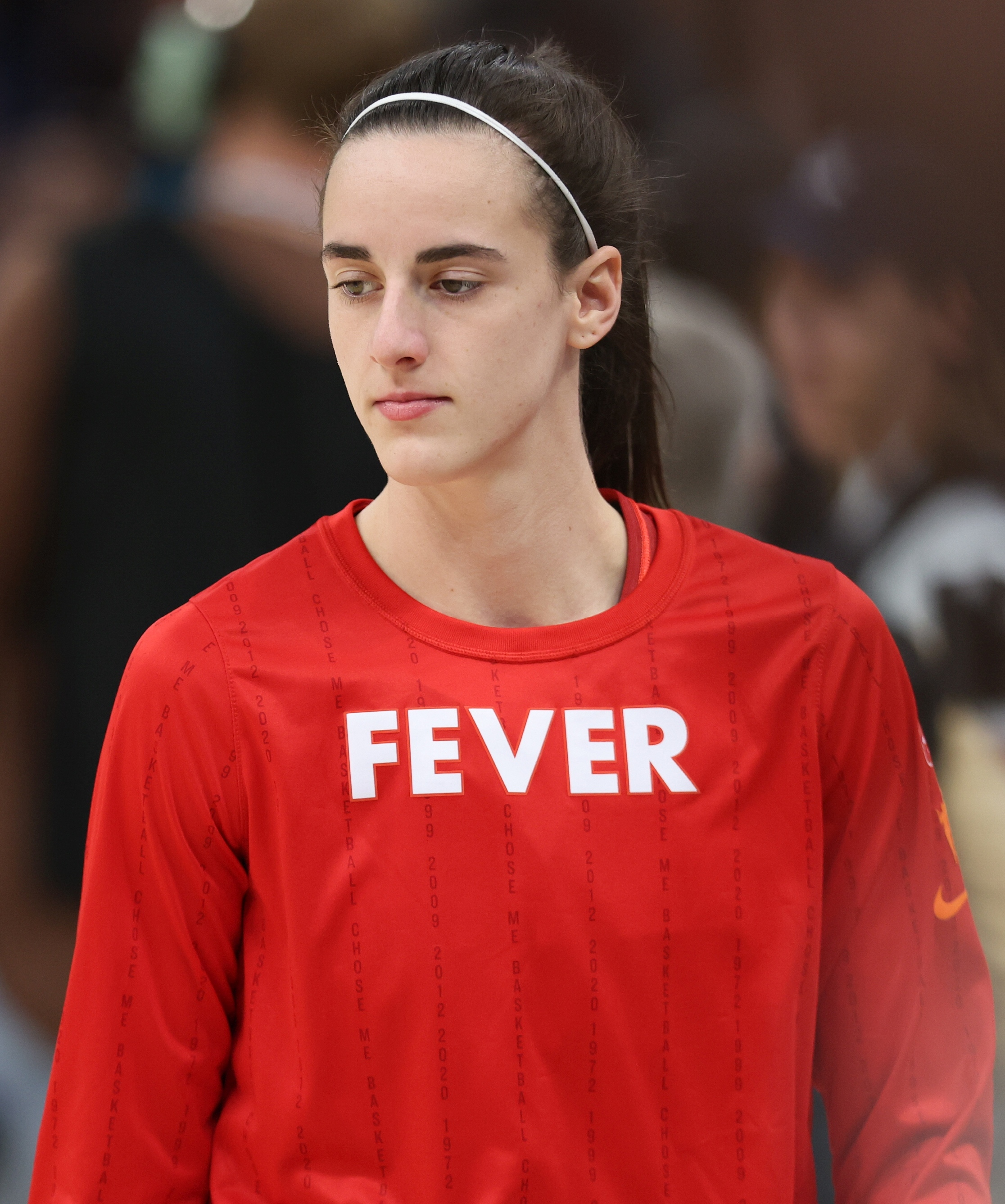
Caitlin Clark during pregame at the 2024 season against the Lynx.

The Fever had a dramatic turnaround in the first season with Clark, going an even 20–20 during the 2024 regular season and making the playoffs for the first time since 2016. Clark averaged 19.2 points, 5.7 rebounds, and 8.4 assists per game, becoming the first-ever true rookie to lead the WNBA in assists. Teammates Kelsey Mitchell and Aliyah Boston also displayed strong statistics. In large part due to Clark, Fever home games drew an average of over 17,000 fans in 2024, actually beating their men's counterpart, the Pacers, on a per-game basis (though the Pacers play 20 more home games). The Fever also drew strongly on the road and set virtually all of the WNBA television records, recording figures oftentimes not seen since the early days of the league in the late 1990s and early 2000s. The sixth-seeded Fever ended up falling to the Connecticut Sun in a two-game first-round sweep.

In August 2024, the WNBA announced that the Fever would host 2025 WNBA All-Star Game and related events in July 2025 for the first time in franchise history. Tickets for All-Star weekend events went on sale on April 29, 2025, and sold out within seven hours.

The Fever announced on October 27, 2024, that they had parted ways with head coach Christie Sides, after Sides' tenure went 33–47. On November 1, 2024, the team announced that Stephanie White would return to the organization as head coach.

Before the 2025 season, the Fever announced on February 1, 2025, that they had acquired Sophie Cunningham from the Phoenix Mercury. In the season, the team finished 24–20. Along the way they won the WNBA Commissioner's Cup with a record of 4–1 and they made the playoffs as No. 6 seed. They upset the No. 3 seed Atlanta Dream in three games in the quarterfinals and they took the No. 2 seed and eventual champion Las Vegas Aces to five games in the semifinals, falling only in overtime of the last game. They accomplished this despite a rash of player injuries. Star Caitlin Clark played only 13 games and missed the last half of the season. Regulars Sophie Cunningham and Sydney Colson suffered season-ending injuries, as did hardship replacements Aari McDonald and Chloe Bibby.

The Fever acquired the tenth pick in the 2026 WNBA draft and, with only one lottery pick, selected Raven Johnson from South Carolina.

== Logo and uniforms ==
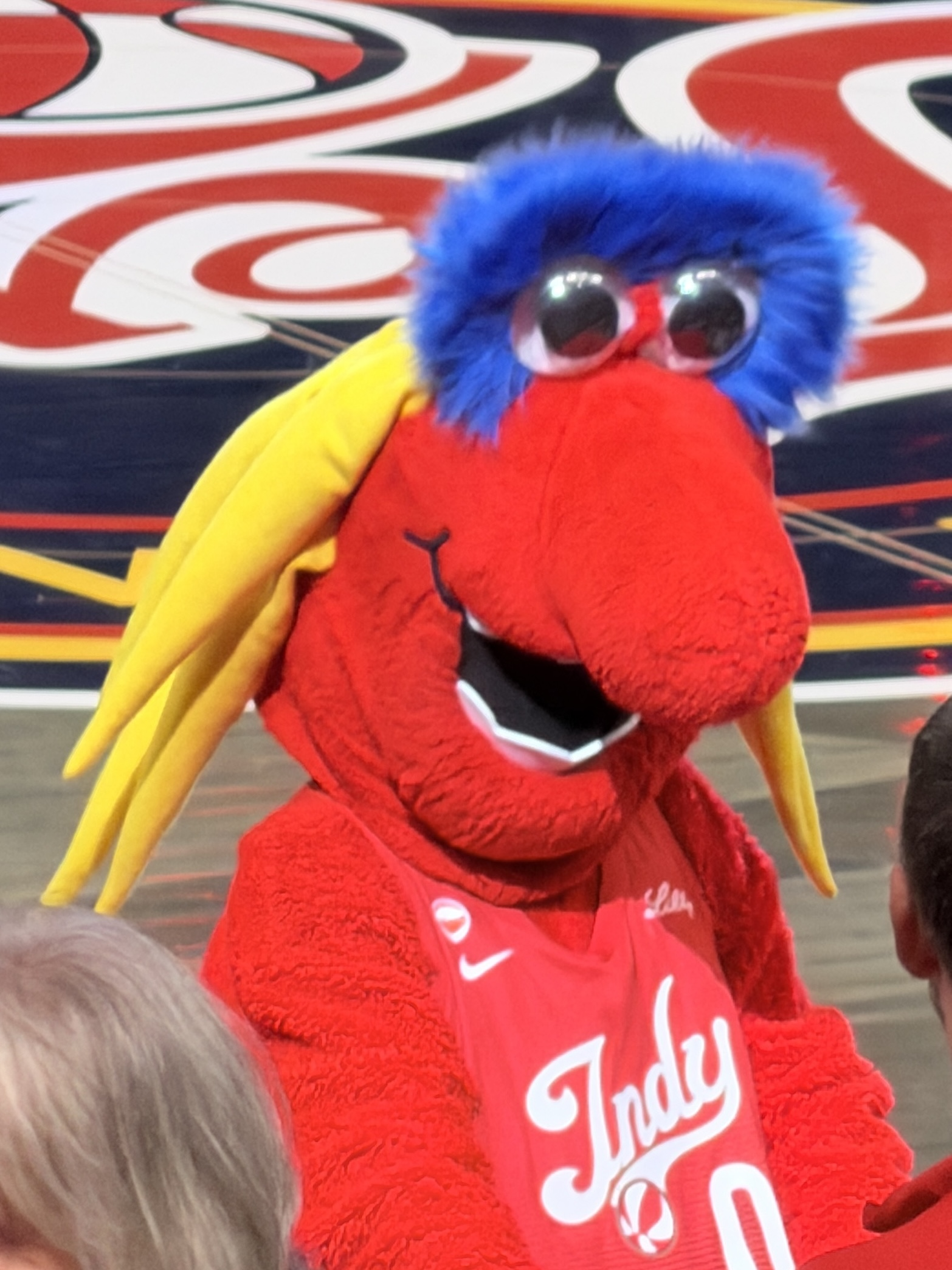
Indiana Fever mascot Freddy Fever at a home game in 2026

=== Logo ===
The logo was created in 1999 by designer Todd Radom.

Todd Radom has posted some sketches of the logo. He has said the logo was inspired by a "decidedly retro vibe that references back to something like the 'Hoosiers' era in terms of basketball in Indiana".

=== Uniforms ===
- 2000–2006: The home jerseys were white with red, dark blue and yellow on the sides. On the front, Fever was written across. The road jersey were dark blue with red and yellow on the sides. Indiana in red letters trimmed with white on the chest.
- 2007–2010: Home jerseys are white with blue and yellow strips/trim from the neck down the side. Fever is written in red across the front and on the back the player name is written in all dark blue under the number also in red trimmed in dark blue. The new road jerseys are dark blue with yellow and white trim/strips. Indiana is written on the front in red with white trim and on the back the number is in red with white trim with the player's name underneath in all white. Each jersey has the Fever's alternate logo at the top on the back.
- 2011–2012: As part of the move to Adidas's Revolution 30 technology, the Fever made subtle changes to the uniforms. Home uniforms remain white, but the 'Fever' wordmark is now written in navy with red and yellow trim. Numbers are now rounded and in red. Away uniforms remain unchanged save for the striping patterns and rounded numbers.
- 2013–2015: On October 19, 2012, the Fever announced that Finish Line will be their uniform sponsor, beginning with the 2013 season. The uniform stayed the same aside from a new number scheme and the addition of the uniform sponsor.
- 2016: As part of a league-wide initiative for its 20th season, all games featured all-color uniform matchups. Therefore, the Fever unveiled a yellow jersey as a light-colored uniform to complement its standard navy uniform.
- 2019: The Fever announced Salesforce as their uniform sponsor, replacing Finish Line. Along with all other WNBA team uniforms, the front of the jersey prominently features both Salesforce and AT&T, a new partner for the WNBA. The number of the player is now just on the back of the jersey.

== Facilities ==
The Indiana Fever announced in 2026 that they were acquiring a new practice facility in Downtown Indianapolis. The Fever have stated this facility will cost $78 million. The land was acquired via a no-bid process. Some have criticized the project, arguing that affordable housing should have been built on the site. However, Indianapolis Mayor Joe Hogsett argued that the project represents a “commitment to equitable investment in women’s sports.”

== Season-by-season records ==
Indiana Fever season-by-season records
Season	Team	Conference		Regular season			Playoff Results	Commissioner's Cup season			Commissioner's Cup Results	Head coach
Season	Team	Conference		W	L	PCT	Playoff Results	W	L	PCT	Commissioner's Cup Results	Head coach
2000	2000	East	7th	9	23	.281	Did not qualify	N/A	N/A	N/A	N/A	Anne Donovan
2001	2001	East	6th	10	22	.313	Did not qualify	N/A	N/A	N/A	N/A	Nell Fortner
2002	2002	East	4th	16	16	.500	Lost Conference Semifinals (New York, 1–2)	N/A	N/A	N/A	N/A	Nell Fortner
2003	2003	East	5th	16	18	.471	Did not qualify	N/A	N/A	N/A	N/A	Nell Fortner
2004	2004	East	6th	15	19	.441	Did not qualify	N/A	N/A	N/A	N/A	Brian Winters
2005	2005	East	2nd	21	13	.618	Won Conference Semifinals (New York, 2–0); Lost Conference Finals (Connecticut, 0–2)	N/A	N/A	N/A	N/A	Brian Winters
2006	2006	East	3rd	21	13	.618	Lost Conference Semifinals (Detroit, 0–2)	N/A	N/A	N/A	N/A	Brian Winters
2007	2007	East	2nd	21	13	.618	Won Conference Semifinals (Connecticut, 2–1); Lost Conference Finals (Detroit, 1–2)	N/A	N/A	N/A	N/A	Brian Winters
2008	2008	East	4th	17	17	.500	Lost Conference Semifinals (Detroit, 1–2)	N/A	N/A	N/A	N/A	Lin Dunn
2009	2009	East	1st	22	12	.647	Won Conference Semifinals (Washington, 2–0); Won Conference Finals (Detroit, 2–1); Lost WNBA Finals (Phoenix, 2–3)	N/A	N/A	N/A	N/A	Lin Dunn
2010	2010	East	3rd	21	13	.618	Lost Conference Semifinals (New York, 1–2)	N/A	N/A	N/A	N/A	Lin Dunn
2011	2011	East	1st	21	13	.618	Won Conference Semifinals (New York, 2–1); Lost Conference Finals (Atlanta, 1–2)	N/A	N/A	N/A	N/A	Lin Dunn
2012	2012	East	2nd	22	12	.647	Won Conference Semifinals (Atlanta, 2–1); Won Conference Finals (Connecticut, 2–1); Won WNBA Finals (Minnesota, 3–1)	N/A	N/A	N/A	N/A	Lin Dunn
2013	2013	East	4th	16	18	.471	Won Conference Semifinals (Chicago, 2–0); Lost Conference Finals (Atlanta, 0–2)	N/A	N/A	N/A	N/A	Lin Dunn
2014	2014	East	2nd	16	18	.471	Won Conference Semifinals (Washington, 2–0); Lost Conference Finals (Chicago, 1–2)	N/A	N/A	N/A	N/A	Lin Dunn
2015	2015	East	3rd	20	14	.588	Won Conference Semifinals (Chicago, 2–1); Won Conference Finals (New York, 2–1); Lost WNBA Finals (Minnesota, 2–3)	N/A	N/A	N/A	N/A	Stephanie White
2016	2016	East	3rd	17	17	.500	Lost First Round (Phoenix, 0–1)	N/A	N/A	N/A	N/A	Stephanie White
2017	2017	East	6th	9	25	.265	Did not qualify	N/A	N/A	N/A	N/A	Pokey Chatman
2018	2018	East	6th	6	28	.176	Did not qualify	N/A	N/A	N/A	N/A	Pokey Chatman
2019	2019	East	4th	13	21	.382	Did not qualify	N/A	N/A	N/A	N/A	Pokey Chatman
2020	2020	East	5th	6	16	.273	Did not qualify	N/A	N/A	N/A	N/A	Marianne Stanley
2021	2021	East	6th	6	26	.188	Did not qualify	2	8	.200	Did not qualify	Marianne Stanley
2022	2022	East	6th	5	31	.139	Did not qualify	2	8	.200	Did not qualify	Marianne Stanley (2–7); Carlos Knox (3–24)
2023	2023	East	6th	13	27	.325	Did not qualify	2	8	.200	Did not qualify	Christie Sides
2024	2024	East	3rd	20	20	.500	Lost First Round (Connecticut, 0–2)	3	2	.600	Did not qualify	Christie Sides
2025	2025	East	3rd	24	20	0.545	Won First Round (Atlanta, 2–1); Lost Semifinals (Las Vegas, 2–3)	4	1	.800	Won Commissioner's Cup (Minnesota, 1–0)	Stephanie White
2026	2026	East	3rd	28	16	0.636	Lost First Round (Las Vegas, 1–2)	4	2	.667	Did not qualify	Stephanie White
Regular season				430	502	.461	3 Conference Championships					
Playoffs				40	41	.494	1 WNBA Championship					

== Players ==
=== Current roster ===
Indiana Fever roster
Players
Coaches

Pos.	No.	Nat.	Name	Height	Weight	DOB	From	Yrs
F	25	(United States)	Billings, Monique	6' 4" (1.93m)	190 lb (86kg)	1996-05-02	UCLA	8
F/C	7	(United States)	Boston, Aliyah	6' 5" (1.96m)	220 lb (100kg)	2001-12-11	South Carolina	3
G	22	(United States)	Clark, Caitlin	6' 0" (1.83m)	157 lb (71kg)	2002-01-22	Iowa	2
G/F	8	(United States)	Cunningham, Sophie (FA)	6' 1" (1.85m)	165 lb (75kg)	1996-08-16	Missouri	7
F/C	12	(Brazil)	Dantas, Damiris (injured)	6' 4" (1.93m)	214 lb (97kg)	1992-11-17	Brazil	10
G	23	(United States)	Hall, Bree	6' 0" (1.83m)	161 lb (73kg)	2003-06-28	South Carolina	1
G	52	(United States)	Harris, Tyasha (FA)	5' 10" (1.78m)	152 lb (69kg)	1998-05-01	South Carolina	6
F	2	(United States)	Hines-Allen, Myisha (FA)	6' 2" (1.88m)	200 lb (91kg)	1995-05-30	Louisville	8
G/F	10	(United States)	Hull, Lexie	6' 2" (1.88m)	155 lb (70kg)	1999-09-13	Stanford	4
G	3	(United States)	Johnson, Raven	5' 8" (1.73m)	167 lb (76kg)	2003-03-04	South Carolina	R
G	0	(United States)	Mitchell, Kelsey (FA)	5' 8" (1.73m)	155 lb (70kg)	1995-11-12	Ohio State	8
C	1	(United States)	Onyiah, Ugonne (FA)	6' 3" (1.91m)		2002-03-12	California	R
C	5	(United States)	Russell, Mercedes (FA)	6' 6" (1.98m)	195 lb (88kg)	1995-07-27	Tennessee	8
F/C	21	(United States)	Timpson, Makayla	6' 2" (1.88m)	173 lb (78kg)	2002-09-20	Florida State	1
F	14	(United States)	VanSlooten, Grace (FA)	6' 3" (1.91m)	180 lb (82kg)	2004-06-16	Michigan State	R

Head coach
(United States) Stephanie White (Purdue)
Assistant coaches
(United States) Briann January (Arizona State)
(United States) Karima Christmas-Kelly (Duke)
(United States) Austin Kelly (Duke)

Legend

- (C) Team captain
- (DP) Unsigned draft pick
- (FA) Free agent
- (S) Suspended
- Injured

WNBA roster page

East
ATL
CHI
CON
IND
NY
TOR
WAS
West
DAL
GS
LV
LA
MIN
PHO
POR
SEA

=== Former players ===
- Tully Bevilaqua (2005–2010)
- Tamika Catchings (2002–2016), served as the team's general manager (2020–2022)
- Anna DeForge (2006–2007)
- Katie Douglas (2008–2013)
- Kathleen Doyle (2020)
- Candice Dupree (2017–2020)
- Yolanda Griffith (2009)
- Ebony Hoffman (2004–2009)
- Niele Ivey (2001–2004), currently the head coach of the Notre Dame Fighting Irish women's basketball team
- Nikki McCray (2002–2003)
- Kelly Miller (2004–2005)
- Bridget Pettis (2002–2003)
- Kristen Rasmussen (2003–2004)
- Kelly Schumacher (2001–2005)
- Olympia Scott (2001–2002, 2006)
- Coquese Washington (2002–2003), currently the head coach for the Rutgers Scarlet Knights women's basketball team
- Stephanie White (2000–2004), currently the head coach of the Indiana Fever, former Indiana Fever assistant (2011–2014) and head coach (2015–2016)
- Tan White (2005–2008)
- Tamika Whitmore (2006–2007)
- Natalie Williams (2003–2005)
- Kara Wolters (2000)
- Shavonte Zellous (2010–2015)
- Shyra Ely (2011)

=== Retired numbers ===
Indiana Fever retired numbers
No.	Player	Position	Tenure
24	Tamika Catchings	SF	2002–16

=== Basketball Hall of Fame ===
Indiana Fever Hall of Famers
Players
No.	Name	Position	Tenure	Inducted (Naismith)	Inducted (Women's)
15	Nikki McCray-Penson	PG	2002–2003	–	2012
33	Yolanda Griffith	C	2009	2021	2014
12	Natalie Williams	PF	2003–2005	–	2016
52	Kara Wolters	C	2000	–	2017
24	Tamika Catchings	SF	2002–2016	2020	2020
Coaches
–	Anne Donovan	Interim	2000	1995 (Note: Inducted as a player.)	1999
–	Marianne Stanley	Head	2020–2022	2022	2002
–	Lin Dunn	Asst./Head	2004–2014	–	2014
–	Gail Goestenkors	Asst.	2015	–	2015
–	Mickie DeMoss	Asst.	2012–2014	–	2018
Contributors
–	Debbie Antonelli	Announcer	2000–present	–	2022

== Coaches and staff ==
=== Owners ===
- Herb Simon (2000–present), owner of the Indiana Pacers
- Melvin Simon (2000–2009), former co-owner of the Indiana Pacers

=== Head coaches ===
Indiana Fever head coaches
Name	Start	End	Seasons	Regular season				Playoffs			
Name	Start	End	Seasons	W	L	PCT	G	W	L	PCT	G
Anne Donovan	August 17, 1999	end of 2000	1	9	23	.281	32	0	0	.000	0
Nell Fortner	August 17, 1999	September 26, 2003	3	42	56	.429	98	1	2	.333	3
Brian Winters	December 11, 2003	October 26, 2007	4	78	58	.574	136	5	7	.417	12
Lin Dunn	December 12, 2007	end of 2014	7	135	103	.567	238	23	18	.561	41
Stephanie White	September 23, 2014	end of 2016	2	37	31	.544	68	6	6	.500	12
Pokey Chatman	November 18, 2016	September 9, 2019	3	28	74	.275	102	0	0	0	0
Marianne Stanley	November 27, 2019	May 25, 2022	3	14	49	.222	63	0	0	0	0
Carlos Knox	May 25, 2022	August 31, 2022	1	3	24	.111	27	0	0	0	0
Christie Sides	November 4, 2022	October 27, 2024	2	33	47	.413	80	0	2	.000	2
Stephanie White (2)	November 1, 2024	present	1	24	20	.545	44	4	4	.500	8

=== General managers ===
- Nell Fortner (2000–2003)
- Kelly Krauskopf (2004–2017)
- Pokey Chatman (2018–2019)
- Tamika Catchings (2020–2022)
- Lin Dunn (2022–2024)
- Amber Cox (2024–present)

=== Assistant coaches ===
- Shelley Patterson (2000–2003)
- Julie Plank (2000–2007)
- Lin Dunn (2004–2007)
- Jim Lewis (2008–2010)
- Gary Kloppenburg (2008–2011, 2015–2016, 2022)
- Stephanie White (2011–2014)
- Mickie DeMoss (2012–2013)
- Sylvia Crawley (2014)
- Gail Goestenkors (2015)
- Steven Key (2016–2017)
- Jessica Miller (2017–2019, 2023–2024)
- Christie Sides (2018–2019)
- Steve Smith (2020–2021)
- April (McDivitt) Schilling (2020)
- Le'Coe Willingham (2020)
- Jhared Simpson (2021–2022)
- Vicki Hall (2021–2022)
- Carlos Knox (2022)
- Karima Christmas-Kelly (2023–present)
- Paul Miller (2023–2024)
- Austin Kelly (2024–present)
- Briann January (2025–present)

== Statistics ==
Indiana Fever statistics
2000s

Season	Individual			Team vs Opponents		
Season	PPG	RPG	APG	PPG	RPG	FG%
2000	K. Wolters (11.9)	K. Wolters (5.3)	R. Williams (3.2)	69.2 vs 71.6	29.1 vs 29.8	.433 vs .449
2001	R. Williams (11.9)	J. Streimikyte (5.1)	R. Williams (3.6)	67.3 vs 70.3	29.2 vs 30.2	.418 vs .449
2002	T. Catchings (18.6)	T. Catchings (8.6)	T. Catchings (3.7)	65.5 vs 66.5	29.6 vs 29.1	.401 vs .442
2003	T. Catchings (19.7)	T. Catchings (8.0)	T. Catchings (3.4)	68.7 vs 68.3	29.1 vs 29.0	.417 vs .439
2004	T. Catchings (16.7)	T. Catchings (7.3)	T. Catchings (3.4)	64.6 vs 66.0	32.4 vs 28.5	.393 vs .431
2005	T. Catchings (14.7)	T. Catchings (7.8)	T. Catchings (4.2)	63.8 vs 62.7	29.8 vs 29.1	.400 vs .431
2006	T. Catchings (16.3)	T. Catchings (7.5)	T. Catchings (3.7)	71.6 vs 68.1	32.2 vs 31.2	.407 vs .432
2007	T. Catchings (16.6)	T. Catchings (9.0)	T. Catchings (4.7)	72.9 vs 69.7	33.9 vs 34.2	.419 vs .402
2008	K. Douglas (15.6)	E. Hoffman (7.8)	T. Catchings (3.3)	72.7 vs 72.3	33.1 vs 34.4	.402 vs .419
2009	K. Douglas (17.6)	T. Catchings (7.2)	T. Catchings (3.1)	76.6 vs 73.6	33.0 vs 34.3	.402 vs .429

2010s

Season	Individual			Team vs Opponents		
Season	PPG	RPG	APG	PPG	RPG	FG%
2010	T. Catchings (18.2)	T. Catchings (7.1)	T. Catchings (4.0)	78.3 vs 74.1	32.5 vs 33.0	.438 vs .416
2011	T. Catchings (15.5)	T. Catchings (7.1)	T. Catchings (3.5)	77.7 vs 73.8	31.6 vs 33.4	.443 vs .424
2012	T. Catchings (17.4)	T. Catchings (7.6)	B. January (3.9)	78.3 vs 72.3	32.2 vs 34.4	.418 vs .429
2013	T. Catchings (17.7)	E. Larkins (7.8)	B. January (3.7)	70.8 vs 70.5	32.0 vs 33.6	.393 vs .437
2014	T. Catchings (16.1)	E. Larkins (9.2)	B. January (3.7)	74.1 vs 75.1	32.3 vs 31.9	.418 vs .443
2015	T. Catchings (13.1)	T. Catchings (7.1)	B. January (3.4)	77.7 vs 75.8	32.4 vs 32.8	.424 vs .440
2016	T. Catchings (12.9)	E. Larkins (7.4)	B. January (4.7)	80.5 vs 80.9	30.9 vs 31.5	.447 vs .467
2017	C. Dupree (15.0)	C. Dupree (5.8)	E. Wheeler (4.1)	75.1 vs 84.3	28.2 vs 35.2	.429 vs .473
2018	C. Dupree (14.2)	N. Achonwa (6.9)	E. Wheeler (4.1)	76.4 vs 85.7	33.0 vs 37.0	.406 vs .473
2019	K. Mitchell (13.6)	T. McCowan (9.0)	E. Wheeler (5.0)	77.6 vs 80.3	35.1 vs 34.7	.422 vs .422

2020s

Season	Individual			Team vs Opponents		
Season	PPG	RPG	APG	PPG	RPG	FG%
2020	K. Mitchell (17.9)	T. McCowan (7.3)	J. Allemand (5.8)	81.7 vs 89.5	33.7 vs 32.7	.442 vs .472
2021	K. Mitchell (17.8)	T. McCowan (9.8)	D. Robinson (3.7)	75.3 vs 85.1	34.3 vs 33.4	.416 vs .459
2022	K. Mitchell (18.4)	N. Smith (7.9)	K. Mitchell (4.2)	78.0 vs 89.1	33.3 vs 35.8	.409 vs .474
2023	K. Mitchell (18.2)	N. Smith (9.2)	E. Wheeler (5.0)	81.0 vs 85.1	34.0 vs 32.5	.442 vs .445
2024	C. Clark (19.2)	A. Boston (8.9)	C. Clark (8.4)	85.0 vs 87.7	35.1 vs 33.6	.456 vs .441
2025	K. Mitchell (20.2)	A. Boston (8.2)	C. Clark (8.8)	84.9 vs 81.5	33.4 vs 32.7	.456 vs .449

== Media coverage ==
Tegna Inc. holds the television rights to the Fever. Games air on WTHR, WTHR-DT3 or WALV-CD in Indianapolis, WCIX or WCIA in Champaign-Springfield, WXIX-DT3 in Cincinnati, WQAD-TV or WQAD-DT3 in Davenport, WKEF-DT3 in Dayton, WOI-TV or KCWI-TV in Des Moines, WFIE-DT2 in Evansville, WPTA-DT3 in Fort Wayne, WPBY-LD or WPBY-DT2 in Lafayette, WKYT-DT2 in Lexington, WHAS-TV or WHAS-DT2 in Louisville, and WCWW-LD, WMYS-LD or WNDU-DT2 in South Bend. Broadcasters for the Fever games are Pat Boylan, Debbie Antonelli, and Tully Bevilaqua. Select games air nationally on ABC (WRTV), ESPN, ESPN2, Ion Television (WIPX-TV), NBA TV, CBS (WTTV), NBC (WTHR), Amazon Prime Video, USA, or NBCSN.

Chris Denari served as the team's Play-by-Play Announcer from 2000 to 2017 before stepping down.

== All-time notes ==
=== Regular season attendance ===
- A sellout for a basketball game at Gainbridge Fieldhouse is:
  - 18,345 from 2000 to 2006.
  - 18,165 from 2007 to 2016.
  - 17,923 from 2017 to 2021.
- A sellout at Indiana Farmers Coliseum, the team's home during part of the 2021 and 2022 seasons, is 6,800.
- A sellout at Hinkle Fieldhouse, the team's home for the end of the 2022 season, is 9,100.

Regular season all-time attendance
Year	Average	High	Low	Sellouts	Total for year	WNBA average
2000	11,267 (4th)	13,178	9,006	0	180,270	9,074
2001	8,683 (8th)	15,198	7,021	0	138,922	9,075
2002	8,434 (9th)	15,488	5,670	0	134,945	9,228
2003	8,340 (8th)	18,345	5,927	1	141,778	8,800
2004	7,589 (10th)	9,656	6,112	0	129,018	8,613
2005	8,382 (7th)	9,823	6,597	0	142,494	8,172
2006	7,204 (10th)	9,312	5,554	0	122,468	7,476
2007	7,227 (11th)	10,542	5,058	0	122,855	7,742
2008	7,702 (10th)	10,533	6,010	0	130,941	7,948
2009	7,939 (6th)	10,050	5,904	0	134,964	8,039
2010	8,265 (6th)	10,076	6,853	0	140,504	7,834
2011	8,052 (7th)	11,521	6,024	0	136,915	7,954
2012	7,582 (6th)	9,403	6,041	0	128,897	7,452
2013	8,164 (4th)	10,756	6,283	0	138,795	7,531
2014	7,900 (6th)	10,625	5,632	0	134,306	7,578
2015	7,485 (5th)	12,189	6,433	0	127,244	7,183
2016	8,575 (5th)	17,704	6,524	0	145,771	7,655
2017	7,538 (7th)	12,282	5,702	0	128,141	7,716
2018	6,311 (7th)	10,006	4,415	0	107,295	6,721
2019	5,887 (7th)	9,247	3,336	0	100,078	6,535
2020	Due to the COVID-19 pandemic, the season was played in Bradenton, Florida without fans.					
2021	Due to the COVID-19 pandemic, the Fever did not allow fans.					2,636
2022	1,776 (12th)	3,212	960	0	31,964	5,679
2023	4,067 (11th)	7,356	2,450	0	81,336	6,615
2024	17,036 (1st)	17,274	15,022	16	340,715	9,807
2025	16,560 (2nd)	17,274	15,012	8	364,325	10,986

=== Draft picks ===
- 2000 Expansion Draft: Gordana Grubin (1), Sandy Brondello (8), Nyree Roberts (9), Rita Williams (16), Kara Wolters (17), Chantel Tremitiere (24)
- 2000: Jurgita Streimikyte (26), Usha Gilmore (42), Latina Davis (50), Renee Robinson (58)
- 2001: Tamika Catchings (3), Kelly Schumacher (14), Niele Ivey (19), Marlene Williams (35), April Brown (51)
- 2002: Tawana McDonald (13), Zuzi Klimesova (17), Kelly Komara (34), LaKeisha Taylor (49), Jillian Danker (52)
- 2003 Miami/Portland Dispersal Draft: Sylvia Crawley (7)
- 2003: Gwen Jackson (6), DeTrina White (20), Ashley McElhiney (35)
- 2004 Cleveland Dispersal Draft: Deanna Jackson (5)
- 2004: Ebony Hoffman (9), Ieva Kublina (31)
- 2005: Tan White (2), Yolanda Paige (16), Ashley Earley (29)
- 2006: La'Tangela Atkinson (9), Kasha Terry (26), Jessica Foley (38), Marina Kuzina (40)
- 2007 Charlotte Dispersal Draft: selection waived
- 2007: Alison Bales (9), Lyndsey Medders (22), Ashley Key (35)
- 2008: Khadijah Whittington (26)
- 2009 Houston Dispersal Draft: selection waived
- 2009: Briann January (6), Christina Wirth (19), Danielle Campbell (32)
- 2010 Sacramento Dispersal Draft: selection waived
- 2010: Jene Morris (11), Armelie Lumanu (23), Joy Cheek (35)
- 2011: Jeanette Pohlen (9), Jori Davis (33)
- 2012: Sasha Goodlett (11), Courtney Hurt (34)
- 2014: Natasha Howard (5), Natalie Achonwa (9), Haiden Palmer (29)
- 2015: Chelsea Gardner (21)
- 2016: Tiffany Mitchell (9), Brene Moseley (21), Julie Allemand (33)
- 2017: Erica McCall (17)
- 2018: Kelsey Mitchell (2), Victoria Vivians (8), Stephanie Mavunga (14)
- 2019: Teaira McCowan (3), Paris Kea (25), Caliya Robinson (28)
- 2020: Lauren Cox (3), Kathleen Doyle (14), Kamiah Smalls (28)
- 2021: Kysre Gondrezick (4), Unique Thompson (19), Trinity Baptiste (24), Chelsey Perry (26), Florencia Chagas (31), Maya Caldwell (33)
- 2022: NaLyssa Smith (2), Emily Engstler (4), Lexie Hull (6), Queen Egbo (10), Destanni Henderson (20), Ameshya Williams-Holliday (25), Ali Patberg (34)
- 2023: Aliyah Boston (1), Grace Berger (7), Taylor Mikesell (13), LaDazhia Williams (17), Victaria Saxton (25)
- 2024: Caitlin Clark (1), Celeste Taylor (15), Leilani Correa (27)
- 2025: Makayla Timpson (19), Bree Hall (20), Yvonne Ejim (33)

=== Trades ===
- December 15, 1999: The Fever acquired Monica Maxwell from the Washington Mystics in exchange for agreeing to select Nyree Roberts in the expansion draft.
- December 15, 1999: The Fever traded Sandy Brondello and a first-round pick in the 2000 Draft to the Miami Sol in exchange for Stephanie White.
- April 25, 2000: The Fever traded Latina Davis and Renee Robinson to the Houston Comets in exchange for Latavia Coleman.
- April 11, 2001: The Fever traded Kara Wolters to the Sacramento Monarchs in exchange for a first-round pick in the 2001 Draft.
- May 27, 2001: The Fever traded a second-round pick in the 2002 Draft to the Detroit Shock in exchange for Olympia Scott and a third-round pick in the 2002 Draft.
- December 5, 2001: The Fever traded Angie Braziel to the Washington Mystics in exchange for Nikki McCray and the right to swap second- and fourth-round picks in the 2002 Draft.
- March 4, 2002: The Fever traded Gordana Grubin to the Phoenix Mercury in exchange for Bridget Pettis and a first-round pick in the 2002 Draft.
- July 20, 2002: The Fever traded Rita Williams to the Houston Comets in exchange for Coquese Washington.
- May 1, 2003: The Fever traded Sylvia Crawley and Gwen Jackson to the San Antonio Silver Stars in exchange for Coretta Brown and Natalie Williams.
- February 5, 2004: The Fever traded the 3rd overall and the 18th overall picks in the 2004 Draft to the Charlotte Sting in exchange for Kelly Miller and the 9th overall pick in the 2004 Draft.
- February 3, 2006: The Fever traded Kelly Miller to the Phoenix Mercury in exchange for Anna DeForge.
- February 24, 2006: The Fever traded Kelly Schumacher and the 12th overall pick in the 2006 Draft to the New York Liberty in exchange for the 9th overall pick in the 2006 Draft.
- March 7, 2007: The Fever traded Olympia Scott to the Phoenix Mercury in exchange for Ann Strother.
- March 23, 2007: The Fever traded La'Tangela Atkinson to the Sacramento Monarchs in exchange for a second-round pick in the 2008 Draft.
- February 19, 2008: The Fever traded Tamika Whitmore, the 9th overall pick in the 2008 Draft and the rights to Jessica Foley to the Connecticut Sun in exchange for Katie Douglas.
- May 14, 2008: The Fever traded K.B. Sharp to the Chicago Sky in exchange for Bernadette Ngoyisa.
- July 4, 2008: The Fever traded Alison Bales to the Atlanta Dream in exchange for Kristen Mann.
- May 27, 2010: The Fever traded a second-round pick in the 2011 Draft to the Tulsa Shock in exchange for Shavonte Zellous.
- April 29, 2011: The Fever traded second- and third-round picks to the Seattle Storm and the Washington Mystics in exchange for Erin Phillips and Seattle's third-round pick in the 2012 Draft.
- March 1, 2012: The Fever traded Tangela Smith to the San Antonio Silver Stars in exchange for Roneeka Hodges.
- July 2, 2012: The Fever traded Roneeka Hodges to the Tulsa Shock in exchange for Karima Christmas.
- March 11, 2014: The Fever traded Erin Phillips to the Phoenix Mercury in exchange for Lynetta Kizer.
- May 12, 2014: The Fever traded a second-round pick in the 2015 Draft to the Phoenix Mercury in exchange for Maggie Lucas.
- March 12, 2015: The Fever traded a first- and third-round picks in the 2015 Draft to the San Antonio Stars in exchange for Shenise Johnson and the second-round pick in the 2015 Draft.
- February 2, 2016: The Fever traded Natasha Howard to the Minnesota Lynx in exchange for Devereaux Peters.
- February 21, 2017: In a three-way trade, the Fever traded Lynetta Kizer and a first-round pick in the 2017 Draft to the Connecticut Sun. The Fever received Candice Dupree and a second-round pick in the 2017 Draft from the Phoenix Mercury.
- February 1, 2018: The Fever acquired C Kayla Alexander and 2019 WNBA Draft third-round pick via trade from Las Vegas Aces for 2019 WNBA Draft second-round pick.
- March 6, 2018: The Fever acquired 8th overall pick in the 2018 WNBA Draft via trade from Phoenix Mercury for Briann January.
- March 6, 2020: The Fever acquired the 14th pick in the 2020 Draft and Minnesota's second-round pick in the 2021 Draft in exchange for Shenise Johnson and the 16th pick in the 2020 Draft.
- February 8, 2021: The Fever acquired Lindsay Allen from Las Vegas and the 24th pick in the 2021 Draft in exchange for the 14th pick in the 2021 Draft.
- February 15, 2021: The Fever acquired the Minnesota Lynx's 1st- and 3rd-round picks in the 2022 Draft, Odyssey Sims and negotiating rights to Temi Fagbenle in exchange for the Fever's 2nd-round pick in the 2022 Draft.
- February 20, 2022: The Fever acquired Bria Hartley, the 7th pick in the 2022 WNBA Draft, Chicago's 2023 First Round Draft pick, and Phoenix's 2022 and 2023 Second Round Draft picks in exchange for Julie Allemand.
- March 8, 2022: The Fever acquired the 4th and 6th picks in the 2022 Draft and Dallas' 2023 First Round pick in exchange for Teaira McCowan, the 7th pick in the 2022 Draft and the 2023 First Round pick from Chicago.
- July 4, 2023: The Fever acquired Amanda Zahui B from Washington in exchange for Queen Egbo.
- February 1, 2025: The Fever acquired Sophie Cunningham (from Phoenix), Jaelyn Brown (from Dallas), and the 19th pick in the 2025 WNBA Draft (from Phoenix).

=== All-Stars ===
- 2000: None
- 2001: Rita Williams
- 2002: Tamika Catchings
- 2003: Tamika Catchings, Natalie Williams
- 2004: Natalie Williams
- 2005: Tamika Catchings
- 2006: Tamika Catchings, Tamika Whitmore
- 2007: Tamika Catchings, Anna DeForge, Tammy Sutton-Brown
- 2008: No All-Star Game
- 2009: Tamika Catchings, Katie Douglas
- 2010: Tamika Catchings, Katie Douglas
- 2011: Tamika Catchings, Katie Douglas
- 2012: No All-Star Game
- 2013: Tamika Catchings, Shavonte Zellous
- 2014: Tamika Catchings, Briann January
- 2015: Tamika Catchings, Marissa Coleman
- 2016: No All-Star Game
- 2017: Candice Dupree
- 2018: None
- 2019: Candice Dupree, Erica Wheeler
- 2020: No All-Star Game
- 2021: None
- 2022: None
- 2023: Aliyah Boston, Kelsey Mitchell
- 2024: Caitlin Clark, Aliyah Boston, Kelsey Mitchell
- 2025: Captain: Caitlin Clark, Aliyah Boston, Kelsey Mitchell

=== Olympians ===
- 2000: Kara Wolters
- 2004: Tamika Catchings
- 2008: Tamika Catchings, Tully Bevilaqua (AUS)
- 2012: Tamika Catchings
- 2016: Tamika Catchings, Natalie Achonwa (CAN)
- 2020: Julie Allemand (BEL)
- 2024: Kristy Wallace (AUS)

=== Honors and awards ===
- 2002 Rookie of the Year: Tamika Catchings
- 2002 All-WNBA First Team: Tamika Catchings
- 2003 All-WNBA First Team: Tamika Catchings
- 2004 All-WNBA Second Team: Tamika Catchings
- 2004 Most Improved Player: Kelly Miller
- 2005 All-WNBA Second Team: Tamika Catchings
- 2005 Defensive Player of the Year: Tamika Catchings
- 2005 All-Defensive First Team: Tamika Catchings
- 2005 All-Defensive First Team: Tully Bevilaqua
- 2005 All-Rookie Team: Tan White
- 2006 All-Decade Team: Tamika Catchings
- 2006 All-WNBA First Team: Tamika Catchings
- 2006 Defensive Player of the Year: Tamika Catchings
- 2006 All-Defensive First Team: Tamika Catchings
- 2006 All-Defensive First Team: Tully Bevilaqua
- 2007 All-WNBA Second Team: Tamika Catchings
- 2007 All-Defensive First Team: Tamika Catchings
- 2007 All-Defensive Second Team: Tully Bevilaqua
- 2007 Kim Perrot Sportsmanship Award: Tully Bevilaqua
- 2008 Most Improved Player: Ebony Hoffman
- 2008 All-Defensive First Team: Tamika Catchings
- 2008 All-Defensive First Team: Tully Bevilaqua
- 2008 Dawn Staley Leadership Award: Tamika Catchings
- 2009 All-WNBA First Team: Tamika Catchings
- 2009 All-WNBA Second Team: Katie Douglas
- 2009 Defensive Player of the Year: Tamika Catchings
- 2009 All-Defensive First Team: Tamika Catchings
- 2009 All-Defensive First Team: Tully Bevilaqua
- 2010 All-WNBA First Team: Tamika Catchings
- 2010 All-WNBA Second Team: Katie Douglas
- 2010 Defensive Player of the Year: Tamika Catchings
- 2010 All-Defensive First Team: Tamika Catchings
- 2010 All-Defensive Second Team: Tully Bevilaqua
- 2010 All-Defensive Second Team: Katie Douglas
- 2010 Three-Point Contest Champion: Katie Douglas
- 2010 Kim Perrot Sportsmanship Award: Tamika Catchings
- 2011 Most Valuable Player: Tamika Catchings
- 2011 All-WNBA First Team: Tamika Catchings
- 2011 All-Defensive First Team: Tamika Catchings
- 2011 All-Defensive Second Team: Katie Douglas
- 2012 Finals Most Valuable Player: Tamika Catchings
- 2012 Defensive Player of the Year: Tamika Catchings
- 2012 All-WNBA First Team: Tamika Catchings
- 2012 All-Defensive First Team: Tamika Catchings
- 2012 All-Defensive First Team: Briann January
- 2013 Most Improved Player: Shavonte Zellous
- 2013 All-WNBA Second Team: Tamika Catchings
- 2013 All-Defensive First Team: Tamika Catchings
- 2013 All-Defensive Second Team: Briann January
- 2013 Kim Perrot Sportsmanship Award: Tamika Catchings
- 2014 All-Defensive First Team: Briann January
- 2014 All-Defensive Second Team: Tamika Catchings
- 2015 All-Rookie Team: Natalie Achonwa
- 2015 All-Defensive First Team: Tamika Catchings
- 2015 All-Defensive First Team: Briann January
- 2015 All-WNBA Second Team: Tamika Catchings
- 2016 All-Defensive First Team: Briann January
- 2016 All-Defensive Second Team: Tamika Catchings
- 2016 All-Rookie Team: Tiffany Mitchell
- 2016 Kim Perrot Sportsmanship Award: Tamika Catchings
- 2016 Dawn Staley Leadership Award: Tamika Catchings
- 2018 All-Rookie Team: Kelsey Mitchell
- 2019 All-Star Game MVP: Erica Wheeler
- 2019 All-Rookie Team: Teaira McCowan
- 2020 All-Rookie Team: Julie Allemand
- 2020 Dawn Staley Leadership Award: Natalie Achonwa
- 2022 All-Rookie Team: Queen Egbo
- 2022 All-Rookie Team: NaLyssa Smith
- 2023 Rookie of the Year: Aliyah Boston
- 2023 All-Rookie Team: Aliyah Boston
- 2023 Dawn Staley Leadership Award: Kelsey Mitchell
- 2024 Rookie of the Year: Caitlin Clark
- 2024 Peak Performer: Assists: Caitlin Clark
- 2024 All-Rookie Team: Caitlin Clark
- 2024 All-WNBA First Team: Caitlin Clark
- 2025 Commissioner's Cup Final MVP: Natasha Howard
- 2025 All-WNBA First Team: Kelsey Mitchell
- 2025 All-WNBA Second Team: Aliyah Boston
- 2025 All-WNBA Second Team: Aliyah Boston

Sporting positions
Preceded by Minnesota Lynx	WNBA Champions; 2012 (First title)	Succeeded by Minnesota Lynx
Preceded by Detroit Shock	WNBA Eastern Conference Champions; 2009 (First title)	Succeeded by Atlanta Dream
Preceded by Atlanta Dream	WNBA Eastern Conference Champions; 2012 (Second title)	Succeeded by Atlanta Dream
Preceded by Chicago Sky	WNBA Eastern Conference Champions; 2015 (Third title)	Succeeded by Discontinued
