= 2002 Houston Comets season =

- Head coach: Van Chancellor
- Arena: Compaq Center

Results
- Record: 24–8 (.750)
- Place: 2nd (Western)
- Playoff finish: Lost first round (2-1) to Utah Starzz

The 2002 WNBA season was the sixth season for the Houston Comets. They made their best record in two years at 24–8. Despite with that, they eventually lost in the first round to the Utah Starzz.

== Transactions ==
=== WNBA draft ===
Round	Pick	Player	Nationality	School/Team/Country
1	10	Michelle Snow	United States	Tennessee
3	42	Shondra Johnson	United States	Alabama
4	58	Cori Enghusen	United States	Stanford

=== Transactions ===
Date	Transaction
April 3, 2002	Traded a 2002 2nd Round Pick to the New York Liberty in exchange for Rebecca Lobo
April 19, 2002	Drafted Michelle Snow, Shondra Johnson and Cori Enghusen in the 2002 WNBA draft
April 23, 2002	Traded Shondra Johnson and a 2003 2nd Round Pick to the New York Liberty in exchange for Grace Daley
May 8, 2002	Waived Niesa Johnson and Tora Suber
May 21, 2002	Waived Larecha Jones
May 22, 2002	Waived Nekeshia Henderson
May 22, 2002	Signed Anna DeForge
May 24, 2002	Waived Anna DeForge and Cori Enghusen
May 24, 2002	Suspended contract of Elena Shakirova
June 17, 2002	Traded Amanda Lassiter to the Seattle Storm in exchange for Sonja Henning
June 17, 2002	Traded Elena Shakirova to the Charlotte Sting in exchange for a 2003 3rd Round Pick
June 20, 2002	Waived Amaya Valdemoro
July 22, 2002	Traded Coquese Washington to the Indiana Fever in exchange for Rita Williams

== Roster ==
2002 Houston Comets roster
Players
Coaches

Pos.	No.	Nat.	Name	Height	Weight	DOB	From	Yrs
G	9	(Brazil)	Arcain, Janeth	5' 11" (1.8m)	147 lb (67kg)	1969-04-11		5
G	8	(United States)	Daley, Grace	5' 8" (1.73m)	147 lb (67kg)	1978-06-06	Tulane	2
G/F	3	(United States)	Gibson, Kelley	5' 9" (1.75m)	137 lb (62kg)	1976-11-07	Maryland	2
G	34	(United States)	Henning, Sonja	5' 7" (1.7m)	143 lb (65kg)	1969-10-04	Stanford	3
F/C	23	(United States)	Jackson, Tammy	6' 2" (1.88m)	190 lb (86kg)	1962-12-03	Florida	5
C	0	(United States)	Johnson, Tiffani	6' 4" (1.93m)	240 lb (109kg)	1975-12-27	Tennessee	3
F	24	(United States)	Lassiter, Amanda	6' 1" (1.85m)	160 lb (73kg)	1979-06-09	Missouri	1
G	20	(United States)	Lewis, Tynesha	5' 10" (1.78m)	152 lb (69kg)	1979-05-08	NC State	1
C	50	(United States)	Lobo, Rebecca	6' 4" (1.93m)	185 lb (84kg)	1973-10-06	Connecticut	1
C	2	(United States)	Snow, Michelle	6' 5" (1.96m)	145 lb (66kg)	1980-03-20	Tennessee	R
G/F	22	(United States)	Swoopes, Sheryl	6' 0" (1.83m)	145 lb (66kg)	1971-03-25	Texas Tech	4
F	7	(United States)	Thompson, Tina	6' 2" (1.88m)	178 lb (81kg)	1975-02-10	USC	5
G	4	(United States)	Washington, Coquese	5' 6" (1.68m)	138 lb (63kg)	1971-01-17	Notre Dame	4
G	33	(United States)	Williams, Rita	5' 6" (1.68m)	135 lb (61kg)	1976-01-14	Connecticut	4

Head coach
(United States) Van Chancellor (Mississippi State)
Assistant coaches
(United States) Michelle Leget
(United States) Kevin Cook
(United States) Alisa Scott

Legend

- (C) Team captain
- (DP) Unsigned draft pick
- (FA) Free agent
- (S) Suspended
- Injured

== Schedule ==
=== Regular season ===
2002 game log
Total: 24–8 (Home: 14–2; Road: 10–6)
May: 1–1 (Home: 1–1; Road: 0–0)

Game	Date	Team	Score	High points	High rebounds	High assists	Location Attendance	Record
1	May 27	Los Angeles	L 55–68	Sheryl Swoopes (15)	Tina Thompson (8)	Sheryl Swoopes (6)	Compaq Center	0–1
2	May 29	Phoenix	W 61–56	Sheryl Swoopes (20)	Tina Thompson (12)	Tina Thompson (6)	Compaq Center	1–1

June : 11–2 (Home: 5–0; Road: 6–2)

Game	Date	Team	Score	High points	High rebounds	High assists	Location Attendance	Record
3	June 1	@ Cleveland	W 69–65 (OT)	Tina Thompson (26)	Johnson; Thompson (8)	Sheryl Swoopes (8)	Gund Arena	2–1
4	June 3	@ Charlotte	L 52–67	Sheryl Swoopes (17)	Johnson; Snow (6)	Janeth Arcain (5)	Charlotte Coliseum	2–2
5	June 5	@ Indiana	W 56–45	Tina Thompson (20)	Arcain; Johnson; Thompson (8)	Swoopes; Thompson (6)	Conseco Fieldhouse	3–2
6	June 9	Sacramento	W 75–62	Tina Thompson (23)	Tina Thompson (13)	Daley; Swoopes; Thompson (3)	Compaq Center	4–2
7	June 11	Charlotte	W 78–66	Sheryl Swoopes (25)	Sheryl Swoopes (8)	Sheryl Swoopes (6)	Compaq Center	5–2
8	June 13	@ Washington	L 64–70	Tina Thompson (18)	Swoopes; Thompson (7)	Sheryl Swoopes (5)	MCI Center	5–3
9	June 15	Minnesota	W 51–50	Kelley Gibson (13)	Tina Thompson (11)	Tynesha Lewis (4)	Compaq Center	6–3
10	June 18	@ Miami	W 53–46	Sheryl Swoopes (16)	Snow; Thompson (7)	Sheryl Swoopes (4)	American Airlines Arena	7–3
11	June 21	Phoenix	W 61–59	Sheryl Swoopes (27)	Tina Thompson (10)	Janeth Arcain (6)	Compaq Center	8–3
12	June 23	@ Portland	W 71–58	Tina Thompson (31)	Tina Thompson (6)	Sheryl Swoopes (5)	Rose Garden	9–3
13	June 25	@ Minnesota	W 73–55	Swoopes; Thompson (18)	Tina Thompson (7)	Janeth Arcain (7)	Target Center	10–3
14	June 28	Utah	W 73–57	Sheryl Swoopes (27)	Arcain; Johnson (7)	Janeth Arcain (5)	Compaq Center	11–3
15	June 30	@ Los Angeles	W 60–58	Sheryl Swoopes (20)	Tiffani Johnson (14)	Arcain; Henning; Swoopes; Thompson (2)	Staples Center	12–3

July : 8–4 (Home: 5–0; Road: 3–4)

Game	Date	Team	Score	High points	High rebounds	High assists	Location Attendance	Record
16	July 3	@ Utah	W 78–67	Janeth Arcain (23)	Tina Thompson (9)	Janeth Arcain (6)	Delta Center	13–3
17	July 6	Detroit	W 61–40	Tina Thompson (19)	Tina Thompson (9)	Sheryl Swoopes (5)	Compaq Center	14–3
18	July 9	Seattle	W 67–59	Sheryl Swoopes (24)	Tina Thompson (13)	Coquese Washington (5)	Compaq Center	15–3
19	July 11	@ Phoenix	L 52–58	Sheryl Swoopes (20)	Sheryl Swoopes (8)	Sheryl Swoopes (4)	America West Arena	15–4
20	July 12	@ Washington	W 74–60	Sheryl Swoopes (15)	Tina Thompson (7)	Janeth Arcain (6)	MCI Center	16–4
21	July 17	@ Utah	L 67–75	Janeth Arcain (17)	Michelle Snow (8)	Janeth Arcain (4)	Delta Center	16–5
22	July 19	@ Portland	L 60–70	Swoopes; Thompson (22)	Michelle Snow (9)	Arcain; Swoopes (3)	Rose Garden	16–6
23	July 20	@ Seattle	W 56–54	Tina Thompson (18)	Tina Thompson (10)	Janeth Arcain (6)	KeyArena	17–6
24	July 23	Seattle	W 74–66	Sheryl Swoopes (19)	Michelle Snow (9)	Sheryl Swoopes (10)	Compaq Center	18–6
25	July 25	Miami	W 69–60	Janeth Arcain (22)	Tina Thompson (8)	Sheryl Swoopes (4)	Compaq Center	19–6
26	July 28	@ New York	L 56–62	Sheryl Swoopes (23)	Tina Thompson (5)	Tina Thompson (3)	Madison Square Garden	19–7
27	July 30	Portland	W 89–59	Tina Thompson (19)	Snow; Swoopes (7)	Sonja Henning (4)	Compaq Center	20–7

August : 4–1 (Home: 3–1; Road: 1–0)

Game	Date	Team	Score	High points	High rebounds	High assists	Location Attendance	Record
28	August 3	Orlando	W 69–62	Sheryl Swoopes (25)	Sonja Henning (9)	Sonja Henning (5)	Compaq Center	21–7
29	August 6	Cleveland	W 67–54	Tina Thompson (19)	Tina Thompson (7)	Arcain; Henning (4)	Compaq Center	22–7
30	August 8	@ Los Angeles	W 67–64	Sheryl Swoopes (31)	Michelle Snow (11)	Sonja Henning (4)	Staples Center	23–7
31	August 10	Sacramento	L 59–61	Sheryl Swoopes (32)	Michelle Snow (9)	Janeth Arcain (3)	Compaq Center	23–8
32	August 13	Minnesota	L 63–51	Rita Williams (15)	Michelle Snow (8)	Henning; Swoopes (4)	Compaq Center	24–8

2002 season schedule

=== Playoffs ===
2002 playoff game log
First round vs. Utah Starzz
Lost Series: 1–2

Game	Date	Team	Score	High points	High rebounds	High assists	Location Attendance	Series
1	August 16	@ Utah	L 59–66	Sheryl Swoopes (17)	Sheryl Swoopes (10)	Sheryl Swoopes (4)	Delta Center	0–1
2	August 18	Utah	W 83–77 (2OT)	Sheryl Swoopes (28)	Tina Thompson (14)	Sheryl Swoopes (7)	Compaq Center	1–1
3	August 20	Utah	L 72–75	Sheryl Swoopes (28)	Michelle Snow (8)	Sheryl Swoopes (6)	Compaq Center	1–2

2002 playoff schedule

=== Season standings ===
Western Conference	W	L	PCT	Conf.	GB
Los Angeles Sparks ^{x}	25	7	.781	17–4	–
Houston Comets ^{x}	24	8	.750	16–5	1.0
Utah Starzz ^{x}	20	12	.625	12–9	5.0
Seattle Storm ^{x}	17	15	.531	10–11	8.0
Portland Fire ^{o}	16	16	.500	8–13	9.0
Sacramento Monarchs ^{o}	14	18	.438	8–13	11.0
Phoenix Mercury ^{o}	11	21	.344	7–14	14.0
Minnesota Lynx ^{o}	10	22	.313	6–15	15.0

== Statistics ==
Legend
GP	Games played	GS	Games started	MPG	Minutes per game	RPG	Rebounds per game
APG	Assists per game	SPG	Steals per game	BPG	Blocks per game	PPG	Points per game
FG%	Field-goal percentage	3P%	3-point field-goal percentage	FT%	Free-throw percentage	TO	Turnovers per game
PF	Fouls per game		Team leader		League leader

=== Regular season ===
Player	GP	GS	MPG	FG%	3P%	FT%	RPG	APG	SPG	BPG	PPG
Tina Thompson	29	29	36.3	.431	.370	.823	7.5	2.1	0.9	0.7	16.7
Sheryl Swoopes	32	32	36.1	.434	.288	.825	4.9	3.3	2.8	0.7	18.5
Janeth Arcain	32	32	34.9	.424	.270	.883	3.9	2.7	1.6	0.2	11.4
Tiffani Johnson	32	32	25.5	.433	.000	.810	5.4	1.2	0.5	0.8	6.3
Sonja Henning	23	10	22.7	.346	.250	.455	2.5	2.2	1.0	0.3	1.9
Coquese Washington	21	15	16.6	.340	.381	1.000	2.0	1.5	0.6	0.0	2.1
Michelle Snow	32	2	15.0	.469	.500	.596	3.7	0.4	0.4	0.8	3.9
Tammy Jackson	5	1	13.8	.375	N/A	.000	2.6	0.2	0.6	0.6	1.2
Kelley Gibson	29	2	9.5	.382	.389	.667	0.7	0.5	0.3	0.2	2.1
Rita Williams	9	0	9.4	.455	.333	.700	0.7	0.8	1.2	0.0	2.1
Tynesha Lewis	17	1	8.5	.433	.375	.625	1.1	0.5	0.2	0.2	2.0
Grace Daley	23	4	8.0	.432	.250	.617	1.0	0.7	0.1	0.0	2.7
Amanda Lassiter	6	0	7.7	.000	.000	.500	1.0	0.3	0.3	0.3	0.2
Rebecca Lobo	21	0	6.3	.469	.429	.250	1.1	0.6	0.0	0.2	1.6

^{‡}Waived/Released during the season
^{†}Traded during the season
^{≠}Acquired during the season
