= 2002 Indiana Fever season =

3rd season in the WNBA

- Head coach: Nell Fortner
- Arena: Conseco Fieldhouse

Results
- Record: 16–16 (.500)
- Place: 4th (Eastern)
- Playoff finish: Lost First Round (2-1) to New York Liberty

The 2002 Indiana Fever season was the franchise's 3rd season in the WNBA and their 2nd season under head coach, Nell Fortner. The team, led by Tamika Catchings, went to the playoffs for the first time in team history, losing in the first round to the New York Liberty.

== Transactions ==
=== WNBA draft ===
Round	Pick	Player	Nationality	School/Team/Country
1	13	Tawana McDonald	United States	Georgia
2	17	Zuzi Klimešová	Czechoslovakia	Vanderbilt
3	34	Kelly Komara	United States	Purdue
4	49	LaKeisha Taylor	United States	Arizona
4	52	Jillian Danker	United States	Vanderbilt

=== Transactions ===
Date	Transaction
March 4, 2002	Traded Gordana Grubin to the Phoenix Mercury in exchange for Bridget Pettis and a 2002 2nd Round Pick
April 19, 2002	Drafted Tawana McDonald, Zuzi Klimešová, Kelly Komara, LaKeisha Taylor and Jillian Danker in the 2002 WNBA draft
April 24, 2002	Waived Marlena Williams and Vicki Hall
May 2, 2002	Waived Jillian Danker and LaKeisha Taylor
May 24, 2002	Waived Itoro Coleman and Kelly Komara
July 22, 2002	Traded Rita Williams to the Houston Comets in exchange for Coquese Washington

== Roster ==
2002 Indiana Fever roster
Players
Coaches

Pos.	No.	Nat.	Name	Height	Weight	DOB	From	Yrs
F	24	(United States)	Catchings, Tamika	6' 1" (1.85m)	167 lb (76kg)	1979-07-21	Tennessee	R
G	33	(United States)	Ivey, Niele	5' 7" (1.7m)	149 lb (68kg)	1977-09-24	Notre Dame	1
G	13	(Czechoslovakia)	Klimešová, Zuzi	6' 2" (1.88m)		1979-01-21	Vanderbilt	R
F	42	(Jamaica)	Malcolm, Nadine	6' 1" (1.85m)	170 lb (77kg)	1975-11-27	Providence	1
F	21	(United States)	Maxwell, Monica	5' 9" (1.75m)	162 lb (73kg)	1976-12-21	Louisiana Tech	3
G	15	(United States)	McCray, Nikki	5' 11" (1.8m)	158 lb (72kg)	1971-12-17	Tennessee	4
C	6	(United States)	Moore, Jackie	6' 2" (1.88m)		1979-11-06	Long Beach State	R
G	32	(United States)	Pettis, Bridget	5' 9" (1.75m)	150 lb (68kg)	1971-01-01	Florida	5
C	11	(United States)	Schumacher, Kelly	6' 5" (1.96m)	183 lb (83kg)	1977-10-14	Connecticut	1
C	0	(United States)	Scott-Richardson, Olympia	6' 2" (1.88m)	175 lb (79kg)	1976-05-05	Stanford	4
F	43	(United States)	Thompson, Alicia	6' 1" (1.85m)	180 lb (82kg)	1976-06-30	Texas Tech	3
G	4	(United States)	Washington, Coquese	5' 6" (1.68m)	138 lb (63kg)	1971-01-17	Notre Dame	4
G	23	(United States)	Williams, Rita	5' 6" (1.68m)	135 lb (61kg)	1976-01-14	Connecticut	4

Head coach
(United States) Nell Fortner (Texas)
Assistant coaches
(United States) Shelley Patterson
(United States) Julie Plank

Legend

- (C) Team captain
- (DP) Unsigned draft pick
- (FA) Free agent
- (S) Suspended
- Injured

== Schedule ==
=== Regular season ===
2002 game log
Total: 16–16 (Home: 10–6; Road: 6–10)
June: 6–8 (Home: 3–2; Road: 3–6)

Game	Date	Team	Score	High points	High rebounds	High assists	Location Attendance	Record
1	June 1	Detroit	W 72–69	Tamika Catchings (23)	Tamika Catchings (13)	Nikki McCray (4)	Conseco Fieldhouse	1–0
2	June 2	@ Detroit	W 78–65	Tamika Catchings (27)	Nikki McCray (7)	Tamika Catchings (4)	The Palace of Auburn Hills	2–0
3	June 5	Houston	L 45–56	Nikki McCray (14)	Olympia Scott-Richardson (17)	Olympia Scott-Richardson (5)	Conseco Fieldhouse	2–1
4	June 7	@ Washington	L 68–89	Catchings; Scott-Richardson (15)	Tamika Catchings (11)	Tamika Catchings (7)	MCI Center	2–2
5	June 8	New York	W 71–62	Tamika Catchings (32)	Tamika Catchings (14)	Rita Williams (4)	Conseco Fieldhouse	3–2
6	June 11	@ Orlando	W 75–69	Catchings; McCray (20)	Olympia Scott-Richardson (8)	Tamika Catchings (5)	TD Waterhouse Centre	4–2
7	June 13	@ Charlotte	L 64–75	Nikki McCray (13)	Catchings; Malcolm (5)	Rita Williams (5)	Charlotte Coliseum	4–3
8	June 15	Cleveland	L 68–79	Tamika Catchings (23)	Olympia Scott-Richardson (8)	McCray; Williams (4)	Conseco Fieldhouse	4–4
9	June 18	@ Utah	L 71–79	Tamika Catchings (14)	Tamika Catchings (11)	Tamika Catchings (5)	Delta Center	4–5
10	June 20	@ Portland	W 81–72	Nikki McCray (30)	Catchings; Scott-Richardson (9)	Tamika Catchings (5)	Rose Garden	5–5
11	June 21	@ Seattle	L 51–63	Olympia Scott-Richardson (12)	Tamika Catchings (8)	Tamika Catchings (7)	KeyArena	5–6
12	June 25	@ New York	L 55–74	Bridget Pettis (13)	Tamika Catchings (8)	Tamika Catchings (6)	Madison Square Garden	5–7
13	June 28	Sacramento	W 67–60	Tamika Catchings (21)	Tamika Catchings (12)	Scott-Richardson; Williams (3)	Conseco Fieldhouse	6–7
14	June 30	@ Miami	L 59–65	Rita Williams (17)	Tamika Catchings (6)	Ivey; McCray (3)	American Airlines Arena	6–8

July : 5–7 (Home: 4–4; Road: 1–3)

Game	Date	Team	Score	High points	High rebounds	High assists	Location Attendance	Record
15	July 3	@ Orlando	L 71–79 (OT)	Tamika Catchings (24)	Olympia Scott-Richardson (9)	Nikki McCray (4)	TD Waterhouse Centre	6–9
16	July 6	Washington	W 50–45	Tamika Catchings (18)	Olympia Scott-Richardson (9)	McCray; Scott-Richardson; Williams (2)	Conseco Fieldhouse	7–9
17	July 8	Cleveland	W 68–57	Tamika Catchings (24)	Tamika Catchings (10)	Ivey; McCray (3)	Conseco Fieldhouse	8–9
18	July 10	Utah	L 69–82	Olympia Scott-Richardson (31)	Catchings; Scott-Richardson (9)	Olympia Scott-Richardson (4)	Conseco Fieldhouse	8–10
19	July 12	Miami	L 62–68	Nadine Malcolm (16)	Olympia Scott-Richardson (11)	Catchings; McCray; Williams (3)	Conseco Fieldhouse	8–11
20	July 17	Los Angeles	L 58–73	Tamika Catchings (15)	Olympia Scott-Richardson (10)	Catchings; McCray; Williams (4)	Conseco Fieldhouse	8–12
21	July 19	New York	L 62–70	Tamika Catchings (21)	Tamika Catchings (12)	Catchings; Ivey (3)	Conseco Fieldhouse	8–13
22	July 22	Charlotte	W 73–72	Catchings; McCray (17)	Tamika Catchings (9)	Tamika Catchings (6)	Conseco Fieldhouse	9–13
23	July 26	Minnesota	W 73–63	Tamika Catchings (23)	Tamika Catchings (5)	Tamika Catchings (7)	Conseco Fieldhouse	10–13
24	July 28	@ Los Angeles	L 62–80	Coquese Washington (14)	Tamika Catchings (7)	Coquese Washington (8)	Staples Center	10–14
25	July 30	@ Sacramento	L 65–74	Tamika Catchings (24)	Tamika Catchings (11)	Tamika Catchings (5)	ARCO Arena	10–15
26	July 31	@ Phoenix	W 58–56	Tamika Catchings (22)	Tamika Catchings (6)	Tamika Catchings (6)	America West Arena	11–15

August : 5–1 (Home: 3–0; Road: 2–1)

Game	Date	Team	Score	High points	High rebounds	High assists	Location Attendance	Record
27	August 3	Charlotte	W 69–48	Nikki McCray (20)	Tamika Catchings (15)	Coquese Washington (6)	Conseco Fieldhouse	12–15
28	August 6	@ Washington	W 64–55	Tamika Catchings (28)	Catchings; Scott-Richardson (10)	McCray; Washington (4)	MCI Center	13–15
29	August 7	Orlando	W 70–63	Tamika Catchings (32)	Tamika Catchings (12)	Coquese Washington (11)	Conseco Fieldhouse	14–15
30	August 9	@ Detroit	L 54–55	Tamika Catchings (21)	Tamika Catchings (12)	Catchings; McCray (2)	The Palace of Auburn Hills	14–16
31	August 11	Miami	W 77–63	Tamika Catchings (20)	Catchings; Scott-Richardson (7)	Tamika Catchings (7)	Conseco Fieldhouse	15–16
32	August 13	@ Cleveland	W 60–56	Kelly Schumacher (15)	Kelly Schumacher (9)	Coquese Washington (7)	Gund Arena	16–16

2002 season schedule

=== Playoffs ===
2002 playoff game log
First round vs. New York Liberty
Lost Series: 1–2

Game	Date	Team	Score	High points	High rebounds	High assists	Location Attendance	Series
1	August 16	New York	W 73–55	Tamika Catchings (29)	Olympia Scott-Richardson (14)	Nikki McCray (5)	Conseco Fieldhouse	1–0
2	August 18	@ New York	L 65–84	Tamika Catchings (20)	Tamika Catchings (14)	Coquese Washington (5)	Madison Square Garden	1–1
3	August 20	@ New York	L 60–75	Nikki McCray (14)	Olympia Scott-Richardson (9)	Coquese Washington (7)	Madison Square Garden	1–2

2002 playoff schedule

=== Season standings ===
Eastern Conference	W	L	PCT	Conf.	GB
New York Liberty ^{x}	18	14	.563	11–10	–
Charlotte Sting ^{x}	18	14	.563	12–9	–
Washington Mystics ^{x}	17	15	.531	12–9	1.0
Indiana Fever ^{x}	16	16	.500	12–9	2.0
Orlando Miracle ^{o}	16	16	.500	13–8	2.0
Miami Sol ^{o}	15	17	.469	11–10	3.0
Cleveland Rockers ^{o}	10	22	.312	7–14	8.0
Detroit Shock ^{o}	9	23	.281	6–15	9.0

== Statistics ==
Legend
GP	Games played	GS	Games started	MPG	Minutes per game	RPG	Rebounds per game
APG	Assists per game	SPG	Steals per game	BPG	Blocks per game	PPG	Points per game
FG%	Field-goal percentage	3P%	3-point field-goal percentage	FT%	Free-throw percentage	TO	Turnovers per game
PF	Fouls per game		Team leader		League leader

=== Regular season ===
Player	GP	GS	MPG	FG%	3P%	FT%	RPG	APG	SPG	BPG	PPG
Tamika Catchings	32	32	36.5	.420	.396	.815	8.6	3.7	2.9	1.3	18.6
Nikki McCray	32	32	33.1	.415	.318	.816	3.0	2.2	0.9	0.1	11.5
Olympia Scott-Richardson	31	31	31.5	.487	.000	.805	6.8	1.7	1.2	0.4	9.4
Coquese Washington	11	8	29.5	.371	.452	.700	3.0	4.4	2.1	0.2	7.3
Rita Williams	20	1	24.2	.289	.254	.735	1.9	2.2	1.1	0.1	6.0
Nadine Malcolm	29	28	20.7	.367	.293	.757	2.1	0.7	0.4	0.1	5.4
Alicia Thompson	18	2	17.4	.358	.241	.706	2.3	0.8	0.4	0.1	5.4
Niele Ivey	31	23	14.2	.352	.380	.810	0.9	1.3	0.5	0.1	2.8
Bridget Pettis	32	0	11.7	.355	.209	.718	1.2	0.5	0.3	0.0	3.5
Kelly Schumacher	31	1	11.4	.506	.000	.692	1.9	0.4	0.2	0.7	3.5
Monica Maxwell	18	0	9.4	.298	.294	1.000	1.7	0.4	0.4	0.2	1.9
Jackie Moore	18	2	7.1	.421	.000	.714	1.6	0.2	0.3	0.1	2.3
Zuzi Klimešová	11	0	3.5	.167	N/A	1.000	0.5	0.2	0.1	0.1	0.5

^{‡}Waived/Released during the season
^{†}Traded during the season
^{≠}Acquired during the season
