= 2002 Charlotte Sting season =

- Head coach: Anne Donovan
- Arena: Charlotte Coliseum

Results
- Record: 18–14 (.563)
- Place: 2nd (Eastern)
- Playoff finish: Lost First Round (2-0) to Washington Mystics

The 2002 WNBA season was the sixth for the Charlotte Sting. The team advanced to the playoffs, but they were later swept in the opening round to the Washington Mystics.

== Transactions ==
=== WNBA draft ===
Round	Pick	Player	Nationality	School/Team/Country
1	7	Sheila Lambert	United States	Baylor
1	9	Shaunzinski Gortman	United States	South Carolina
3	41	Edniesha Curry	United States	Oregon
4	57	Jessie Stomski	United States	Wisconsin

=== Transactions ===
Date	Transaction
April 18, 2002	Traded Clarisse Machanguana to the Orlando Miracle in exchange for a 2002 1st Round Pick
April 19, 2002	Drafted Sheila Lambert, Shaunzinski Gortman, Edniesha Curry and Jessie Stomski in the 2002 WNBA draft
April 19, 2002	Traded Shaunzinski Gortman to the Minnesota Lynx in exchange for Erin Buescher and Maylana Martin
May 2, 2002	Waived Jessie Stomski
May 20, 2002	Waived Anna DeForge
May 24, 2002	Waived Edniesha Curry, Maylana Martin, Rasheeda Clark and Tiffany Travis
May 24, 2002	Waived Beth Cunningham
June 17, 2002	Traded a 2003 3rd Round Pick to the Houston Comets in exchange for Elena Shakirova
June 17, 2002	Waived Shantia Owens

== Roster ==
2002 Charlotte Sting roster
Players
Coaches

Pos.	No.	Nat.	Name	Height	Weight	DOB	From	Yrs
G	20	(United States)	Anderson, Keisha	5' 7" (1.7m)	125 lb (57kg)	1974-05-08	Wisconsin	2
G	13	(United States)	Edwards, Tonya	5' 10" (1.78m)	160 lb (73kg)	1968-03-13	Tennessee	3
F/C	7	(United States)	Enis, Shalonda	6' 1" (1.85m)	185 lb (84kg)	1974-12-03	Alabama	3
C	3	(United States)	Erb, Summer	6' 6" (1.98m)	240 lb (109kg)	1977-07-25	NC State	2
F	21	(United States)	Feaster, Allison	5' 11" (1.8m)	168 lb (76kg)	1976-02-11	Harvard	4
G	31	(United States)	Lambert, Sheila	5' 7" (1.7m)	125 lb (57kg)	1980-07-21	Baylor	R
G	8	(United States)	Miller, Kelly	5' 10" (1.78m)	140 lb (64kg)	1978-09-06	Georgia	1
F	25	(United States)	Owens, Shantia	6' 2" (1.88m)	175 lb (79kg)	1978-05-16	Kentucky	1
F	11	(United States)	Buescher, Erin	6' 3" (1.91m)	181 lb (82kg)	1979-06-05	Master's	1
C	15	(Soviet Union)	Shakirova, Elena	6' 3" (1.91m)	190 lb (86kg)	1970-06-02		2
F	23	(United States)	Smith, Charlotte	6' 0" (1.83m)	148 lb (67kg)	1973-08-23	North Carolina	3
G	5	(United States)	Staley, Dawn	5' 6" (1.68m)	134 lb (61kg)	1970-05-04	Virginia	3
G	32	(United States)	Stinson, Andrea	5' 10" (1.78m)	158 lb (72kg)	1967-11-25	NC State	5
C	55	(Canada)	Sutton-Brown, Tammy	6' 4" (1.93m)	199 lb (90kg)	1978-01-27	Rutgers	1

Head coach
(United States) Anne Donovan (Old Dominion)
Assistant coaches
(United States) Cheryl Reeve
(United States) Trudi Lacey

Legend

- (C) Team captain
- (DP) Unsigned draft pick
- (FA) Free agent
- (S) Suspended
- Injured

== Schedule ==
=== Regular season ===
2002 game log
Total: 18–14 (Home: 11–5; Road: 7–9)
June: 6–6 (Home: 5–0; Road: 1–6)

Game	Date	Team	Score	High points	High rebounds	High assists	Location Attendance	Record
1	June 2	Los Angeles	W 94–87 (OT)	Kelly Miller (23)	Charlotte Smith (9)	Dawn Staley (9)	Charlotte Coliseum	1–0
2	June 3	Houston	W 67–52	Andrea Stinson (23)	Stinson; Sutton-Brown (6)	Dawn Staley (7)	Charlotte Coliseum	2–0
3	June 6	@ Seattle	L 59–65	Tammy Sutton-Brown (11)	Tammy Sutton-Brown (6)	Dawn Staley (6)	KeyArena	2–1
4	June 8	@ Utah	L 64–69	Tammy Sutton-Brown (14)	Tammy Sutton-Brown (10)	Andrea Stinson (5)	Delta Center	2–2
5	June 9	@ Phoenix	L 77–80	Andrea Stinson (24)	Andrea Stinson (8)	Dawn Staley (3)	America West Arena	2–3
6	June 11	@ Houston	L 66–78	Tammy Sutton-Brown (18)	Stinson; Sutton-Brown (7)	Dawn Staley (7)	Compaq Center	2–4
7	June 13	Indiana	W 75–64	Andrea Stinson (15)	Erin Buescher (6)	Charlotte Smith (5)	Charlotte Coliseum	3–4
8	June 16	@ New York	L 53–54	Tammy Sutton-Brown (14)	Andrea Stinson (11)	Dawn Staley (6)	Madison Square Garden	3–5
9	June 19	Washington	W 78–64	Andrea Stinson (27)	Andrea Stinson (10)	Dawn Staley (7)	Charlotte Coliseum	4–5
10	June 22	Miami	W 76–63	Allison Feaster (23)	Tammy Sutton-Brown (9)	Andrea Stinson (6)	Charlotte Coliseum	5–5
11	June 26	@ Detroit	W 80–73	Andrea Stinson (22)	Andrea Stinson (8)	Dawn Staley (10)	The Palace of Auburn Hills	6–5
12	June 30	@ Washington	L 55–56	Andrea Stinson (14)	Allison Feaster (8)	Allison Feaster (4)	MCI Center	6–6

July : 8–5 (Home: 5–4; Road: 3–1)

Game	Date	Team	Score	High points	High rebounds	High assists	Location Attendance	Record
13	July 1	Phoenix	W 90–68	Tonya Edwards (14)	Erin Buescher (11)	Miller; Stinson (5)	Charlotte Coliseum	7–6
14	July 3	Portland	L 73–76	Allison Feaster (17)	Tammy Sutton-Brown (10)	Charlotte Smith (6)	Charlotte Coliseum	7–7
15	July 5	@ Miami	W 72–68	Andrea Stinson (18)	Tammy Sutton-Brown (9)	Dawn Staley (6)	American Airlines Arena	8–7
16	July 6	Cleveland	W 78–67	Allison Feaster (24)	Tammy Sutton-Brown (8)	Dawn Staley (7)	Charlotte Coliseum	9–7
17	July 9	Miami	L 55–66	Dawn Staley (13)	Andrea Stinson (8)	Feaster; Smith; Staley (2)	Charlotte Coliseum	9–8
18	July 12	@ Orlando	W 72–67	Allison Feaster (19)	Kelly Miller (7)	Dawn Staley (4)	TD Waterhouse Centre	10–8
19	July 13	Minnesota	W 63–60	Tammy Sutton-Brown (13)	Tammy Sutton-Brown (7)	Miller; Staley; Stinson (4)	Charlotte Coliseum	11–8
20	July 17	Orlando	W 89–62	Tammy Sutton-Brown (22)	Tammy Sutton-Brown (6)	Staley; Stinson (8)	Charlotte Coliseum	12–8
21	July 19	Sacramento	W 70–51	Kelly Miller (16)	Andrea Stinson (6)	Dawn Staley (6)	Charlotte Coliseum	13–8
22	July 22	@ Indiana	L 72–73	Dawn Staley (14)	Stinson; Sutton-Brown (6)	Allison Feaster (6)	Conseco Fieldhouse	13–9
23	July 24	@ Cleveland	W 73–66 (OT)	Andrea Stinson (17)	Andrea Stinson (12)	Dawn Staley (5)	Gund Arena	14–9
24	July 25	Cleveland	L 73–83	Andrea Stinson (14)	Andrea Stinson (6)	Dawn Staley (4)	Charlotte Coliseum	14–10
25	July 27	Detroit	L 66–74	Andrea Stinson (17)	Andrea Stinson (5)	Staley; Stinson (4)	Charlotte Coliseum	14–11

August : 4–3 (Home: 1–1; Road: 3–2)

Game	Date	Team	Score	High points	High rebounds	High assists	Location Attendance	Record
26	August 1	@ Orlando	L 63–65	Allison Feaster (14)	Allison Feaster (6)	Dawn Staley (8)	TD Waterhouse Centre	14–12
27	August 3	@ Indiana	L 48–69	Feaster; Staley (8)	Tammy Sutton-Brown (5)	Edwards; Staley (2)	Conseco Fieldhouse	14–13
28	August 4	New York	L 58–71	Andrea Stinson (16)	Charlotte Smith (7)	Allison Feaster (4)	Charlotte Coliseum	14–14
29	August 6	@ Detroit	W 76–65	Tammy Sutton-Brown (19)	Tammy Sutton-Brown (9)	Dawn Staley (6)	The Palace of Auburn Hills	15–14
30	August 9	@ Minnesota	W 68–62	Kelly Miller (15)	Allison Feaster (5)	Dawn Staley (6)	Target Center	16–14
31	August 11	@ New York	W 71–58	Allison Feaster (18)	Erb; Stinson (7)	Dawn Staley (6)	Madison Square Garden	17–14
32	August 13	Washington	W 67–57	Allison Feaster (20)	Stinson; Sutton-Brown (7)	Dawn Staley (5)	Charlotte Coliseum	18–14

2002 season schedule

=== Playoffs ===
2002 playoff game log
First round vs. Washington Mystics
Lost Series: 0–2

Game	Date	Team	Score	High points	High rebounds	High assists	Location Attendance	Record
1	August 15	@ Washington	L 62–74	Andrea Stinson (16)	Smith; Stinson; Sutton-Brown (5)	Dawn Staley (5)	MCI Center	0–1
2	August 17	Washington	L 59–62	Andrea Stinson (14)	Allison Feaster (12)	Staley; Stinson (6)	Charlotte Coliseum	0–2

2002 playoff schedule

=== Season standings ===
Eastern Conference	W	L	PCT	Conf.	GB
New York Liberty ^{x}	18	14	.563	11–10	–
Charlotte Sting ^{x}	18	14	.563	12–9	–
Washington Mystics ^{x}	17	15	.531	12–9	1.0
Indiana Fever ^{x}	16	16	.500	12–9	2.0
Orlando Miracle ^{o}	16	16	.500	13–8	2.0
Miami Sol ^{o}	15	17	.469	11–10	3.0
Cleveland Rockers ^{o}	10	22	.312	7–14	8.0
Detroit Shock ^{o}	9	23	.281	6–15	9.0

== Statistics ==
Legend
GP	Games played	GS	Games started	MPG	Minutes per game	RPG	Rebounds per game
APG	Assists per game	SPG	Steals per game	BPG	Blocks per game	PPG	Points per game
FG%	Field-goal percentage	3P%	3-point field-goal percentage	FT%	Free-throw percentage	TO	Turnovers per game
PF	Fouls per game		Team leader		League leader

=== Regular season ===
Player	GP	GS	MPG	FG%	3P%	FT%	RPG	APG	SPG	BPG	PPG
Dawn Staley	32	32	33.2	.366	.398	.762	1.8	5.1	1.5	0.0	8.8
Allison Feaster	32	32	29.9	.394	.418	.824	3.7	1.9	1.2	0.4	11.8
Andrea Stinson	32	32	29.7	.456	.414	.688	5.5	2.8	1.2	0.3	12.8
Charlotte Smith	32	32	27.8	.410	.374	.741	3.8	1.7	0.7	0.5	8.0
Tammy Sutton-Brown	32	29	27.7	.529	N/A	.713	6.0	0.5	0.9	1.1	11.9
Kelly Miller	32	0	17.3	.446	.471	.763	2.1	1.5	0.7	0.0	6.6
Shalonda Enis	4	0	14.8	.278	.000	1.000	2.3	0.8	0.3	0.5	4.8
Erin Buescher	29	0	13.5	.402	.364	.694	3.1	0.6	0.4	0.5	3.3
Summer Erb	31	3	11.0	.565	N/A	.720	2.3	0.3	0.4	0.4	2.8
Tonya Edwards	29	0	10.4	.364	.280	.717	1.4	0.8	0.6	0.1	3.9
Sheila Lambert	3	0	5.3	.333	N/A	N/A	1.0	1.0	0.3	0.0	0.7
Elena Shakirova	1	0	5.0	N/A	N/A	.500	1.0	0.0	1.0	0.0	1.0
Keisha Anderson	7	0	4.4	.250	.250	N/A	0.9	0.7	0.0	0.0	1.0
Shantia Owens	2	0	3.0	N/A	N/A	N/A	1.0	0.0	0.0	0.0	0.0

^{‡}Waived/Released during the season
^{†}Traded during the season
^{≠}Acquired during the season
