= 2002 Detroit Shock season =

- Head coach: Greg Williams (fired Jun. 19, 0–10 record); Bill Laimbeer (9–13 record)
- Arena: The Palace of Auburn Hills

Results
- Record: 9–23 (.281)
- Place: 8th (Eastern)
- Playoff finish: Did not qualify

The 2002 WNBA season was the fifth season for the Detroit Shock. The team went 0–13 in their first thirteen games, finishing with a franchise worst 9–23.

== Transactions ==
=== WNBA draft ===
Round	Pick	Player	Nationality	School/Team/Country
1	2	Swin Cash	United States	UConn
2	18	Lenae Williams	United States	DePaul
2	20	Ayana Walker	United States	Louisiana Tech
2	21	Jill Chapman	United States	Indiana
2	22	Kathy Wambe	Belgium	Dexia Namur (Belgium)
3	47	Ericka Haney	United States	Notre Dame

=== Transactions ===
Date	Transaction
April 19, 2002	Drafted Swin Cash, Lenae Williams, Ayana Walker, Jill Chapman, Kathy Wambe and Ericka Haney in the 2002 WNBA draft
April 26, 2002	Waived Rachael Sporn
May 3, 2002	Traded Claudia Neves to the Phoenix Mercury in exchange for a 2003 4th Round Pick
May 10, 2002	Traded a 2003 4th Round Pick to the Sacramento Monarchs in exchange for Stacy Clinesmith
May 24, 2002	Waived Ericka Haney and Stacy Clinesmith
June 19, 2002	Fired Greg Williams as Head Coach
June 19, 2002	Hired Bill Laimbeer as Head Coach
June 21, 2002	Waived Oksana Zakalyuzhnaya
June 27, 2002	Waived Begoña García
June 28, 2002	Signed Stacy Clinesmith
July 7, 2002	Traded Wendy Palmer and a 2003 2nd Round Pick to the Orlando Miracle in exchange for Elaine Powell and a 2003 1st Round Pick

== Roster ==
2002 Detroit Shock roster
Players
Coaches

Pos.	No.	Nat.	Name	Height	Weight	DOB	From	Yrs
G/F	24	(United States)	Brown, Edwina	5' 9" (1.75m)	163 lb (74kg)	1978-07-01	Texas	2
G	10	(United States)	Canty, Dominique	5' 9" (1.75m)	166 lb (75kg)	1977-03-02	Alabama	3
F	32	(United States)	Cash, Swin	6' 1" (1.85m)	171 lb (78kg)	1979-09-22	Connecticut	R
C	42	(United States)	Chapman, Jill	6' 4" (1.93m)		1979-11-04	Indiana	R
G	21	(United States)	Clinesmith, Stacy	5' 5" (1.65m)	125 lb (57kg)	1977-03-02	UC Santa Barbara	2
F/C	54	(United States)	Farris, Barbara	6' 3" (1.91m)	200 lb (91kg)	1976-09-10	Tulane	2
G	5	(Spain)	García, Begoña	5' 5" (1.65m)		1976-09-03		R
F	44	(Senegal)	Ndiaye-Diatta, Astou	6' 3" (1.91m)	182 lb (83kg)	1973-11-05	Southern Nazarene	3
G/F	14	(United States)	Nolan, Deanna	5' 9" (1.75m)	147 lb (67kg)	1979-08-25	Georgia	1
F	3	(United States)	Palmer, Wendy	6' 2" (1.88m)	165 lb (75kg)	1974-08-12	Virginia	5
G	5	(United States)	Powell, Elaine	5' 8" (1.73m)	150 lb (68kg)	1975-08-09	LSU	3
F	16	(Brazil)	Santos, Kelly	6' 3" (1.91m)	188 lb (85kg)	1979-11-10		1
F	12	(United States)	Walker, Ayana	6' 3" (1.91m)	143 lb (65kg)	1979-09-10	Louisiana Tech	R
G/F	23	(United States)	Williams, Lenae	5' 11" (1.8m)	155 lb (70kg)	1979-07-14	DePaul	R
C	7	(Soviet Union)	Zakalyuzhnaya, Oksana	6' 6" (1.98m)	174 lb (79kg)	1977-12-18		1

Head coach
(United States) Bill Laimbeer (Notre Dame)
Assistant coaches
(United States) Laura Ramus

Legend

- (C) Team captain
- (DP) Unsigned draft pick
- (FA) Free agent
- (S) Suspended
- Injured

== Schedule ==
=== Regular season ===
2002 game log
Total: 9–23 (Home: 7–9; Road: 2–14)
May: 0–1 (Home: 0–0; Road: 0–1)

Game	Date	Team	Score	High points	High rebounds	High assists	Location Attendance	Record
1	May 30	@ Orlando	L 66–80	Swin Cash (16)	Astou Ndiaye-Diatta (7)	Deanna Nolan (5)	TD Waterhouse Centre	0–1

June : 1–12 (Home: 1–5; Road: 0–7)

Game	Date	Team	Score	High points	High rebounds	High assists	Location Attendance	Record
2	June 1	@ Indiana	L 62–79	Deanna Nolan (15)	Edwina Brown (6)	Brown; Cash (5)	Conseco Fieldhouse	0–2
3	June 2	Indiana	L 65–78	Wendy Palmer (16)	Wendy Palmer (5)	Edwina Brown (6)	The Palace of Auburn Hills	0–3
4	June 5	@ New York	L 59–60	Swin Cash (15)	Cash; Palmer (8)	Edwina Brown (6)	Madison Square Garden	0–4
5	June 6	@ Cleveland	L 55–72	Wendy Palmer (15)	Edwina Brown (5)	Dominique Canty (6)	Gund Arena	0–5
6	June 9	New York	L 63–70	Swin Cash (14)	Wendy Palmer (15)	Edwina Brown (5)	The Palace of Auburn Hills	0–6
7	June 11	@ Los Angeles	L 80–90	Deanna Nolan (18)	Swin Cash (8)	Dominique Canty (3)	Staples Center	0–7
8	June 13	@ Phoenix	L 67–70	Wendy Palmer (20)	Cash; Ndiaye-Diatta (7)	Dominique Canty (5)	America West Arena	0–8
9	June 15	@ Portland	L 60–67	Wendy Palmer (14)	Swin Cash (12)	Edwina Brown (5)	Rose Garden	0–9
10	June 18	@ Washington	L 67–75	Nolan; Palmer (16)	Wendy Palmer (9)	Dominique Canty (5)	MCI Center	0–10
11	June 21	Orlando	L 59–80	Swin Cash (20)	Palmer; Walker (9)	Canty; Ndiaye-Diatta (2)	The Palace of Auburn Hills	0–11
12	June 26	Charlotte	L 73–80	Dominique Canty (17)	Astou Ndiaye-Diatta (7)	Dominique Canty (6)	The Palace of Auburn Hills	0–12
13	June 28	Miami	L 74–78 (OT)	Swin Cash (17)	Wendy Palmer (9)	Dominique Canty (8)	The Palace of Auburn Hills	0–13
14	June 30	Sacramento	W 71–60	Swin Cash (19)	Swin Cash (11)	Dominique Canty (6)	The Palace of Auburn Hills	1–13

July : 5–6 (Home: 4–2; Road: 1–4)

Game	Date	Team	Score	High points	High rebounds	High assists	Location Attendance	Record
15	July 1	@ Minnesota	L 80–85 (OT)	Swin Cash (16)	Swin Cash (8)	Swin Cash (5)	Target Center	1–14
16	July 6	@ Houston	L 40–61	Astou Ndiaye-Diatta (12)	Cash; Ndiaye-Diatta (6)	Deanna Nolan (3)	Compaq Center	1–15
17	July 8	@ Utah	L 76–94	Swin Cash (25)	Swin Cash (6)	Deanna Nolan (5)	Delta Center	1–16
18	July 10	New York	W 66–63	Swin Cash (16)	Swin Cash (10)	Dominique Canty (4)	The Palace of Auburn Hills	2–16
19	July 12	Minnesota	W 72–69	Swin Cash (18)	Swin Cash (6)	Elaine Powell (5)	The Palace of Auburn Hills	3–16
20	July 18	@ Washington	L 59–63	Swin Cash (16)	Swin Cash (15)	Edwina Brown (5)	MCI Center	3–17
21	July 20	Miami	W 69–48	Swin Cash (11)	Astou Ndiaye-Diatta (6)	Nolan; Powell (5)	The Palace of Auburn Hills	4–17
22	July 23	Utah	L 75–86	Swin Cash (21)	Swin Cash (11)	Elaine Powell (5)	The Palace of Auburn Hills	4–18
23	July 25	Washington	W 64–58	Swin Cash (17)	Astou Ndiaye-Diatta (12)	Elaine Powell (6)	The Palace of Auburn Hills	5–18
24	July 27	@ Charlotte	W 74–66	Swin Cash (20)	Swin Cash (10)	Elaine Powell (8)	Charlotte Coliseum	6–18
25	July 28	Seattle	L 59–72	Swin Cash (15)	Ndiaye-Diatta; Powell (7)	Elaine Powell (4)	The Palace of Auburn Hills	6–19

August : 3–4 (Home: 2–2; Road: 1–2)

Game	Date	Team	Score	High points	High rebounds	High assists	Location Attendance	Record
26	August 1	Cleveland	L 66–68	Swin Cash (19)	Swin Cash (10)	Elaine Powell (5)	The Palace of Auburn Hills	6–20
27	August 3	@ Cleveland	W 68–57	Swin Cash (24)	Swin Cash (14)	Elaine Powell (6)	Gund Arena	7–20
28	August 4	Phoenix	W 91–75	Swin Cash (14)	Swin Cash (9)	Dominique Canty (7)	The Palace of Auburn Hills	8–20
29	August 6	Charlotte	L 65–76	Elaine Powell (15)	Kelly Santos (7)	Swin Cash (5)	The Palace of Auburn Hills	8–21
30	August 9	Indiana	W 55–54	Brown; Cash (10)	Elaine Powell (5)	Elaine Powell (4)	The Palace of Auburn Hills	9–21
31	August 11	@ Orlando	L 58–71	Elaine Powell (15)	Elaine Powell (8)	Elaine Powell (4)	TD Waterhouse Centre	9–22
32	August 13	@ Miami	L 56–61	Swin Cash (13)	Swin Cash (8)	Swin Cash (4)	American Airlines Arena	9–23

2002 season schedule

=== Season standings ===
Eastern Conference	W	L	PCT	Conf.	GB
New York Liberty ^{x}	18	14	.563	11–10	–
Charlotte Sting ^{x}	18	14	.563	12–9	–
Washington Mystics ^{x}	17	15	.531	12–9	1.0
Indiana Fever ^{x}	16	16	.500	12–9	2.0
Orlando Miracle ^{o}	16	16	.500	13–8	2.0
Miami Sol ^{o}	15	17	.469	11–10	3.0
Cleveland Rockers ^{o}	10	22	.312	7–14	8.0
Detroit Shock ^{o}	9	23	.281	6–15	9.0

== Statistics ==
Legend
GP	Games played	GS	Games started	MPG	Minutes per game	RPG	Rebounds per game
APG	Assists per game	SPG	Steals per game	BPG	Blocks per game	PPG	Points per game
FG%	Field-goal percentage	3P%	3-point field-goal percentage	FT%	Free-throw percentage	TO	Turnovers per game
PF	Fouls per game		Team leader		League leader

=== Regular season ===
Player	GP	GS	MPG	FG%	3P%	FT%	RPG	APG	SPG	BPG	PPG
Swin Cash	32	32	33.7	.408	.206	.762	6.9	2.7	1.2	1.0	14.8
Wendy Palmer	16	16	29.0	.425	.317	.660	6.0	1.3	0.8	0.1	11.5
Elaine Powell	15	13	26.5	.446	.273	.850	4.2	4.0	1.5	0.5	9.9
Deanna Nolan	32	32	25.1	.415	.368	.806	2.7	1.9	0.8	0.4	8.7
Astou Ndiaye-Diatta	32	32	24.3	.467	.000	.590	5.1	1.2	0.5	0.4	8.6
Dominique Canty	28	12	22.3	.338	.200	.724	2.5	3.0	0.8	0.1	5.7
Edwina Brown	28	7	19.6	.328	.500	.719	2.9	2.1	0.9	0.3	4.1
Barbara Farris	32	16	17.6	.419	.000	.738	2.9	0.5	0.4	0.3	4.5
Ayana Walker	32	0	17.1	.377	.222	.694	3.7	0.5	0.4	1.1	5.1
Kelly Santos	12	0	14.1	.381	N/A	.600	2.7	0.6	0.3	0.8	3.7
Stacy Clinesmith	12	0	8.8	.381	.400	.833	0.4	1.4	0.1	0.1	2.3
Begoña García	8	0	8.0	.182	.333	.500	0.5	1.1	0.4	0.0	1.0
Lenae Williams	27	0	6.6	.297	.241	.000	0.7	0.1	0.1	0.0	2.7
Jill Chapman	19	0	6.3	.370	.000	.667	1.4	0.0	0.2	0.1	1.2
Oksana Zakaluzhnaya	3	0	3.3	.333	N/A	N/A	0.0	0.0	0.0	0.3	0.7

^{‡}Waived/Released during the season
^{†}Traded during the season
^{≠}Acquired during the season
