= 2002 New York Liberty season =

- Head coach: Richie Adubato
- Arena: Madison Square Garden

Results
- Record: 18–14 (.563)
- Place: 1st (Eastern)
- Playoff finish: WNBA Finals (lost to Los Angeles 0–2)

Media
- Television: WPIX (WB 11); MSG Network

The 2002 WNBA season was the sixth season for the New York Liberty. The Liberty franchise reached their 4th berth to the WNBA Finals, but lost in a sweep to the Los Angeles Sparks. This was the last season that New York qualified for the WNBA Finals, before their appearance in 2023.

== Transactions ==
=== WNBA draft ===
Round	Pick	Player	Nationality	School/Team/Country
2	26	Linda Fröhlich	West Germany	UNLV
3	46	Tracy Gahan	United States	Iowa State
4	62	Deedee Warley	United States	Maryland

=== Transactions ===
Date	Transaction
April 3, 2002	Traded Rebecca Lobo to the Houston Comets in exchange for a 2002 2nd Round Pick
April 18, 2002	Traded a 2002 1st Round Pick to the Utah Starzz in exchange for Korie Hlede
April 19, 2002	Drafted Linda Fröhlich, Tracy Gahan, and Deedee Warley in the 2002 WNBA draft
April 22, 2002	Traded Andrea Nagy to the Sacramento Monarchs in exchange for a 2003 2nd Round Pick
April 23, 2002	Traded Grace Daley to the Houston Comets in exchange for a 2003 2nd Round Pick
May 7, 2002	Waived Bethany Donaphin and Deedee Warley
May 8, 2002	Waived Shondra Johnson
May 21, 2002	Waived Mactabene Amachree and Tracy Gahan
July 2, 2002	Waived Marina Ferragut

== Roster ==
2002 New York Liberty roster
Players
Coaches

Pos.	No.	Nat.	Name	Height	Weight	DOB	From	Yrs
C	42	(United States)	Cooper, Camille	6' 4" (1.93m)		1979-02-05	Purdue	1
F/C	31	(West Germany)	Fröhlich, Linda	6' 2" (1.88m)	185 lb (84kg)	1979-06-23	UNLV	R
G	25	(United States)	Hammon, Becky	5' 6" (1.68m)	136 lb (62kg)	1977-03-11	Colorado State	3
G	7	(Socialist Federal Republic of Yugoslavia)	Hlede, Korie	5' 9" (1.75m)	155 lb (70kg)	1975-03-29	Duquesne	4
G/F	55	(United States)	Johnson, Vickie	5' 9" (1.75m)	150 lb (68kg)	1972-04-15	Louisiana Tech	5
C	50	(Zaire)	Ngoyisa, Bernadette	6' 4" (1.93m)	195 lb (88kg)	1982-08-26		R
F/C	24	(United States)	Phillips, Tari	6' 2" (1.88m)	200 lb (91kg)	1970-03-06	Central Florida	3
F	3	(United States)	Robinson, Crystal	5' 11" (1.8m)	155 lb (70kg)	1974-01-22	SE Oklahoma State	3
G	11	(United States)	Weatherspoon, Teresa	5' 8" (1.73m)	161 lb (73kg)	1965-12-08	Louisiana Tech	5
F	44	(United States)	Whitmore, Tamika	6' 2" (1.88m)	215 lb (98kg)	1977-06-05	Memphis	3
F	23	(United States)	Wicks, Sue	6' 3" (1.91m)	174 lb (79kg)	1966-11-26	Rutgers	5

Head coach
(United States) Richie Adubato (William Paterson)
Assistant coaches
(United States) Lisa White
(United States) Jeff House
(United States) Pat Coyle

Legend

- (C) Team captain
- (DP) Unsigned draft pick
- (FA) Free agent
- (S) Suspended
- Injured

== Schedule ==
=== Regular season ===
2002 game log
Total: 18–14 (Home: 10–6; Road: 8–8)
May: 2–1 (Home: 0–0; Road: 2–1)

Game	Date	Team	Score	High points	High rebounds	High assists	Location Attendance	Record
1	May 25	@ Los Angeles	L 64–72	Vickie Johnson (19)	Vickie Johnson (6)	Teresa Weatherspoon (5)	Staples Center	0–1
2	May 28	@ Portland	W 84–62	Becky Hammon (22)	Tari Phillips (9)	Teresa Weatherspoon (11)	Rose Garden	1–1
3	May 30	@ Seattle	W 78–61	Crystal Robinson (17)	Johnson; Whitmore (7)	Teresa Weatherspoon (4)	KeyArena	2–1

June : 6–7 (Home: 4–3; Road: 2–4)

Game	Date	Team	Score	High points	High rebounds	High assists	Location Attendance	Record
4	June 2	Miami	W 58–52	Crystal Robinson (16)	Phillips; Whitmore (5)	Teresa Weatherspoon (3)	Madison Square Garden	3–1
5	June 5	Detroit	W 60–59	Vickie Johnson (21)	Tari Phillips (8)	Teresa Weatherspoon (4)	Madison Square Garden	4–1
6	June 8	@ Indiana	L 62–71	Tamika Whitmore (18)	Phillips; Wicks (6)	Teresa Weatherspoon (6)	Conseco Fieldhouse	4–2
7	June 9	@ Detroit	W 70–63	Crystal Robinson (19)	Phillips; Wicks (6)	Teresa Weatherspoon (4)	The Palace of Auburn Hills	5–2
8	June 11	@ Utah	W 71–68	Tari Phillips (22)	Tari Phillips (8)	Teresa Weatherspoon (5)	Delta Center	6–2
9	June 13	@ Sacramento	L 77–78 (2OT)	Tamika Whitmore (21)	Phillips; Robinson (7)	Teresa Weatherspoon (12)	ARCO Arena	6–3
10	June 16	Charlotte	W 54–53	Vickie Johnson (15)	Tari Phillips (7)	Teresa Weatherspoon (5)	Madison Square Garden	7–3
11	June 18	Orlando	L 62–71	Crystal Robinson (19)	Tari Phillips (7)	Teresa Weatherspoon (6)	Madison Square Garden	7–4
12	June 21	@ Cleveland	L 69–80	Vickie Johnson (19)	Tari Phillips (5)	Teresa Weatherspoon (9)	Gund Arena	7–5
13	June 23	@ Orlando	L 65–77	Tari Phillips (16)	Phillips; Whitmore (8)	Johnson; Weatherspoon (5)	TD Waterhouse Centre	7–6
14	June 25	Indiana	W 74–55	Crystal Robinson (24)	Tari Phillips (8)	Teresa Weatherspoon (10)	Madison Square Garden	8–6
15	June 28	Cleveland	L 58–67	Tari Phillips (18)	Tari Phillips (9)	Robinson; Weatherspoon (4)	Madison Square Garden	8–7
16	June 30	Portland	L 44–54	Crystal Robinson (17)	Tari Phillips (7)	Teresa Weatherspoon (6)	Madison Square Garden	8–8

July : 7–2 (Home: 5–0; Road: 2–2)

Game	Date	Team	Score	High points	High rebounds	High assists	Location Attendance	Record
17	July 2	Seattle	W 74–63	Tari Phillips (19)	Hammon; Phillips; Weathersppon; Wicks (3)	Johnson; Weathersppon (6)	Madison Square Garden	9–8
18	July 8	Phoenix	W 77–71	Tamika Whitmore (28)	Phillips; Whitmore (5)	Teresa Weatherspoon (9)	Madison Square Garden	10–8
19	July 10	@ Detroit	L 63–66	Crystal Robinson (17)	Tari Phillips (7)	Teresa Weatherspoon (5)	The Palace of Auburn Hills	10–9
20	July 13	@ Washington	W 67–53	Vickie Johnson (19)	Tari Phillips (12)	Vickie Johnson (5)	MCI Center	11–9
21	July 18	Los Angeles	W 72–59	Tamika Whitmore (25)	Tari Phillips (9)	Teresa Weatherspoon (6)	Target Center	12–9
22	July 19	@ Indiana	W 70–62	Becky Hammon (15)	Tari Phillips (5)	Vickie Johnson (4)	Conseco Fieldhouse	13–9
23	July 22	Cleveland	W 73–52	Tari Phillips (15)	Hammon; Phillips (5)	Hammon; Johnson (3)	Madison Square Garden	14–9
24	July 23	@ Miami	L 46–54	Crystal Robinson (12)	Tamika Whitmore (8)	Teresa Weatherspoon (3)	American Airlines Arena	14–10
25	July 28	Houston	W 62–56	Tamika Whitmore (15)	Phillips; Whitmore (8)	Teresa Weatherspoon (4)	Madison Square Garden	15–10

August : 3–4 (Home: 1–3; Road: 2–1)

Game	Date	Team	Score	High points	High rebounds	High assists	Location Attendance	Record
26	August 2	Miami	W 66–54	Vickie Johnson (20)	Tari Phillips (8)	Teresa Weatherspoon (10)	Madison Square Garden	16–10
27	August 4	@ Charlotte	W 71–58	Vickie Johnson (20)	Sue Wicks (9)	Teresa Weatherspoon (8)	Charlotte Coliseum	17–10
28	August 6	Minnesota	L 49–52	Tari Phillips (17)	Tari Phillips (11)	Vickie Johnson (6)	Madison Square Garden	17–11
29	August 8	Washington	L 54–65	Tari Phillips (22)	Tari Phillips (11)	Hammon; Weatherspoon (4)	Madison Square Garden	17–12
30	August 9	@ Washington	W 74–66	Becky Hammon (22)	Weatherspoon; Whitmore (6)	Teresa Weatherspoon (8)	MCI Center	18–12
31	August 11	Charlotte	L 58–71	Crystal Robinson (16)	Tamika Whitmore (8)	Teresa Weatherspoon (7)	Madison Square Garden	18–13
32	August 13	@ Orlando	L 63–70	Phillips; Whitmore (20)	Tari Phillips (10)	Hammon; Robinson (3)	TD Waterhouse Centre	18–14

2002 season schedule

=== Playoffs ===
2002 playoff game log
First round vs. Indiana Fever
Won Series: 2–1

Game	Date	Team	Score	High points	High rebounds	High assists	Location Attendance	Record
1	August 16	@ Indiana	L 55–73	Tamika Whitmore (18)	Becky Hammon (5)	Teresa Weatherspoon (4)	Conseco Fieldhouse	0–1
2	August 18	Indiana	W 84–65	Tamika Whitmore (24)	Tamika Whitmore (6)	Teresa Weatherspoon (9)	Madison Square Garden	1–1
3	August 20	Indiana	W 75–60	Vickie Johnson (19)	Vickie Johnson (7)	Teresa Weatherspoon (7)	Madison Square Garden	2–1

Conference Finals vs. Washington Mystics
Won Series: 2–1

Game	Date	Team	Score	High points	High rebounds	High assists	Location Attendance	Record
1	August 22	@ Washington	L 74–79	Tari Phillips (21)	Phillips; Robinson; Weatherspoon; Whitmore (5)	Teresa Weatherspoon (9)	MCI Center	0–1
2	August 24	Washington	W 96–79	Phillips; Whitmore (23)	Tari Phillips (6)	Teresa Weatherspoon (12)	Madison Square Garden	1–1
3	August 25	Washington	W 64–57	Vickie Johnson (19)	Tari Phillips (11)	Teresa Weatherspoon (4)	Madison Square Garden	2–1

WNBA Finals vs. Los Angeles Sparks
Lost Series: 0–2

Game	Date	Team	Score	High points	High rebounds	High assists	Location Attendance	Record
1	August 29	Los Angeles	L 63–71	Becky Hammon (18)	Teresa Weatherspoon (7)	Johnson; Phillips; Weatherspoon (3)	Madison Square Garden	0–1
2	August 31	@ Los Angeles	L 66–69	Phillips; Whitmore (17)	Tari Phillips (8)	Teresa Weatherspoon (5)	Staples Center	0–2

2002 playoff schedule

=== Season standings ===
Eastern Conference	W	L	PCT	Conf.	GB
New York Liberty ^{x}	18	14	.563	11–10	–
Charlotte Sting ^{x}	18	14	.563	12–9	–
Washington Mystics ^{x}	17	15	.531	12–9	1.0
Indiana Fever ^{x}	16	16	.500	12–9	2.0
Orlando Miracle ^{o}	16	16	.500	13–8	2.0
Miami Sol ^{o}	15	17	.469	11–10	3.0
Cleveland Rockers ^{o}	10	22	.312	7–14	8.0
Detroit Shock ^{o}	9	23	.281	6–15	9.0

== Statistics ==
Legend
GP	Games played	GS	Games started	MPG	Minutes per game	RPG	Rebounds per game
APG	Assists per game	SPG	Steals per game	BPG	Blocks per game	PPG	Points per game
FG%	Field-goal percentage	3P%	3-point field-goal percentage	FT%	Free-throw percentage	TO	Turnovers per game
PF	Fouls per game		Team leader		League leader

=== Regular season ===
Player	GP	GS	MPG	FG%	3P%	FT%	RPG	APG	SPG	BPG	PPG
Crystal Robinson	32	32	33.4	.417	.370	.819	2.8	2.5	1.5	0.4	11.8
Vickie Johnson	31	31	33.2	.456	.421	.803	3.5	2.8	0.9	0.1	11.6
Tari Phillips	32	31	31.5	.491	.000	.675	7.0	1.3	1.8	0.4	14.1
Tamika Whitmore	32	32	30.5	.477	.000	.733	4.4	0.7	0.8	1.3	12.7
Teresa Weatherspoon	32	32	29.8	.342	.100	.519	2.7	5.7	1.3	0.1	3.4
Becky Hammon	32	1	20.6	.442	.386	.679	2.1	1.7	0.8	0.0	8.0
Sue Wicks	30	0	14.3	.343	.000	.667	3.4	0.5	0.7	0.5	2.2
Korie Hlede	16	0	8.1	.423	.000	.444	1.0	0.8	0.4	0.1	1.6
Camille Cooper	23	1	5.2	.393	N/A	.625	0.7	0.1	0.2	0.2	1.2
Linda Fröhlich	16	0	4.2	.100	.000	1.000	0.8	0.1	0.1	0.0	0.4
Bernadette Ngoyisa	7	0	1.7	.600	N/A	N/A	0.7	0.0	0.0	0.3	0.9

^{‡}Waived/Released during the season
^{†}Traded during the season
^{≠}Acquired during the season
