= 2002 Minnesota Lynx season =

- Head coach: Brian Agler (resigned Jul. 16, 6–13 record); Heidi VanDerveer (interim, 4–9 record)
- Arena: Target Center

Results
- Record: 10–22 (.313)
- Place: 8th (Western)
- Playoff finish: Did not qualify

The 2002 Minnesota Lynx season was the 4th season for the Minnesota Lynx of the Women's National Basketball Association, and the fourth and final season under head coach Brian Agler as he resigned on July 16, 2002 with a 6–13 record.

The season tipped-off on May 25, 2002 against the Starzz.

The Lynx failed to improve on their 12-20 record from the last season, missed the playoffs for the fourth consecutive season, and finished last place in the division for the first time in franchise history.

== Transactions ==
=== WNBA draft ===
Round	Pick	Player	Nationality	School/Team/Country
1	6	Tamika Williams	United States	UConn
3	38	Lindsey Meder	United States	Iowa
4	54	Shárron Francis	United States	Old Dominion

=== Transactions ===
Date	Transaction
April 19, 2002	Traded Erin Buescher to the Charlotte Sting in exchange for Shaunzinski Gortman
April 19, 2002	Drafted Tamika Williams, Lindsey Meder, and Shárron Francis in the 2002 WNBA draft
April 26, 2002	Signed ShaRae Mansfield and Sonja Tate
May 7, 2002	Waived ShaRae Mansfield and Shárron Francis
May 11, 2002	Signed Angelina Wolvert
May 12, 2002	Waived Kate Paye
May 16, 2002	Waived Angelina Wolvert
May 16, 2002	Suspended contract of Sonja Tate
June 11, 2002	Traded Betty Lennox and a 2003 1st Round Pick to the Miami Sol in exchange for Tamara Moore and a 2003 2nd Round Pick
June 13, 2002	Signed Tamara Moore
July 16, 2002	Brian Agler resigned as head coach
July 16, 2002	Hired Heidi VanDerveer as interim head coach

== Roster ==
2002 Minnesota Lynx roster
Players
Coaches

Pos.	No.	Nat.	Name	Height	Weight	DOB	From	Yrs
F	25	(Soviet Union)	Abrosimova, Svetlana	6' 2" (1.88m)	169 lb (77kg)	1980-07-09	Connecticut	1
C	33	(United States)	Burse, Janell	6' 5" (1.96m)	199 lb (90kg)	1979-05-19	Tulane	1
G	32	(United States)	Gortman, Shaunzinski	5' 10" (1.78m)	158 lb (72kg)	1979-12-07	South Carolina	R
G	8	(Australia)	Harrower, Kristi	5' 4" (1.63m)	139 lb (63kg)	1975-03-04		3
G	22	(United States)	Lennox, Betty	5' 8" (1.73m)	143 lb (65kg)	1976-12-04	Louisiana Tech	2
G	21	(United States)	Moore, Tamara	5' 10" (1.78m)	176 lb (80kg)	1980-04-11	Wisconsin	R
G/F	34	(United States)	Pride, Lynn	6' 2" (1.88m)	180 lb (82kg)	1978-10-16	Kansas	2
G/F	23	(United States)	Schweitzer, Georgia	6' 0" (1.83m)		1979-01-31	Duke	1
G	30	(United States)	Smith, Katie	5' 11" (1.8m)	175 lb (79kg)	1974-06-04	Ohio State	3
F	3	(United States)	Stires, Shanele	5' 11" (1.8m)	208 lb (94kg)	1972-05-21	Kansas State	2
C	31	(United States)	Van Gorp, Michele	6' 6" (1.98m)	187 lb (85kg)	1977-05-10	Duke	3
F/C	52	(United States)	Whiting-Raymond, Val	6' 2" (1.88m)	199 lb (90kg)	1972-04-09	Stanford	2
F	20	(United States)	Williams, Tamika	6' 2" (1.88m)	195 lb (88kg)	1980-04-12	Connecticut	R

Head coach
(United States) Heidi VanDerveer (College of Charleston)
Assistant coaches
(United States) Kelly Kramer

Legend

- (C) Team captain
- (DP) Unsigned draft pick
- (FA) Free agent
- (S) Suspended
- Injured

== Schedule ==
=== Regular season ===
2002 game log
Total: 10–22 (Home: 7–9; Road: 3–13)
May: 1–1 (Home: 0–1; Road: 1–0)

Game	Date	Team	Score	High points	High rebounds	High assists	Location Attendance	Record
1	May 25	Utah	L 75–79 (OT)	Svetlana Abrosimova (26)	Tamika Williams (11)	Abrosimova; Williams (4)	Target Center	0–1
2	May 28	@ Miami	W 66–63	Svetlana Abrosimova (21)	Tamika Williams (7)	Betty Lennox (5)	American Airlines Arena	1–1

June : 4–7 (Home: 3–2; Road: 1–5)

Game	Date	Team	Score	High points	High rebounds	High assists	Location Attendance	Record
3	June 1	@ New York	W 63–61	Katie Smith (23)	Tamika Williams (7)	Georgia Schweitzer (4)	ARCO Arena	2–1
4	June 4	@ Seattle	L 68–78 (OT)	Svetlana Abrosimova (16)	Abrosimova; Williams (6)	Abrosimova; Schweitzer (4)	KeyArena	2–2
5	June 8	Los Angeles	L 72–76	Svetlana Abrosimova (23)	Abrosimova; Williams (6)	Georgia Schweitzer (4)	Target Center	2–3
6	June 11	Sacramento	W 72–63	Katie Smith (22)	Pride; Williams (7)	Katie Smith (5)	Target Center	3–3
7	June 13	Portland	W 60–46	Katie Smith (17)	Svetlana Abrosimova (13)	Tamika Williams (4)	Target Center	4–3
8	June 15	@ Houston	L 50–51	Abrosimova; Williams (17)	Pride; Williams (7)	Lynn Pride (3)	Compaq Center	4–4
9	June 18	@ Portland	L 51–59	Katie Smith (13)	Abrosimova; Williams (7)	Katie Smith (3)	Rose Garden	4–5
10	June 21	@ Los Angeles	L 64–73	Katie Smith (27)	Tamika Williams (9)	Kristi Harrower (6)	Staples Center	4–6
11	June 23	@ Phoenix	L 61–70	Tamika Williams (19)	Tamika Williams (12)	Harrower; Moore (3)	America West Arena	4–7
12	June 25	Houston	L 55–73	Tamara Moore (16)	Tamika Williams (8)	Tamara Moore (5)	Target Center	4–8
13	June 29	Orlando	W 67–59	Katie Smith (25)	Svetlana Abrosimova (10)	Svetlana Abrosimova (5)	Target Center	5–8

July : 2–11 (Home: 2–4; Road: 0–7)

Game	Date	Team	Score	High points	High rebounds	High assists	Location Attendance	Record
14	July 1	Detroit	W 85–80	Katie Smith (28)	Tamika Williams (11)	Tamara Moore (7)	Target Center	6–8
15	July 3	Washington	L 63–64	Katie Smith (18)	Tamara Moore (6)	Pride; Smith; Williams (3)	Target Center	6–9
16	July 5	@ Utah	L 56–87	Shaunzinski Gortman (14)	Lynn Pride (8)	Tamara Moore (4)	Delta Center	6–10
17	July 10	Portland	L 72–75	Katie Smith (21)	Abrosimova; Williams (9)	Lynn Pride (3)	Target Center	6–11
18	July 12	@ Detroit	L 69–72	Katie Smith (27)	Tamika Williams (7)	Abrosimova; Harrower (4)	The Palace of Auburn Hills	6–12
19	July 13	@ Charlotte	L 60–63	Svetlana Abrosimova (17)	Lynn Pride (7)	Lynn Pride (5)	Charlotte Coliseum	6–13
20	July 17	Cleveland	L 48–58	Tamara Moore (14)	Tamika Williams (8)	Tamara Moore (6)	Target Center	6–14
21	July 19	Miami	L 58–61	Katie Smith (12)	Michele Van Gorp (6)	Tamara Moore (6)	Target Center	6–15
22	July 24	Utah	W 70–62	Katie Smith (20)	Svetlana Abrosimova (12)	Tamara Moore (6)	Target Center	7–15
23	July 26	@ Indiana	L 63–73	Tamara Moore (19)	Svetlana Abrosimova (11)	Lynn Pride (4)	Conseco Fieldhouse	7–16
24	July 28	@ Sacramento	L 56–66	Katie Smith (19)	Tamara Moore (7)	Tamara Moore (3)	ARCO Arena	7–17
25	July 29	@ Phoenix	L 45–57	Svetlana Abrosimova (13)	Michele Van Gorp (8)	Katie Smith (4)	America West Arena	7–18
26	July 30	@ Seattle	L 63–75	Katie Smith (13)	Moore; Smith; Williams (6)	Tamara Moore (4)	Staples Center	7–19

August : 3–3 (Home: 2–2; Road: 1–1)

Game	Date	Team	Score	High points	High rebounds	High assists	Location Attendance	Record
27	August 2	Phoenix	W 75–51	Katie Smith (22)	Svetlana Abrosimova (6)	Schweitzer; Smith (5)	Target Center	8–19
28	August 4	Seattle	W 73–60	Schweitzer; Smith (17)	Tamika Williams (9)	Moore; Smith (5)	Target Center	9–19
29	August 6	@ New York	W 52–49	Tamika Williams (13)	Tamika Williams (7)	Kristi Harrower (3)	Madison Square Garden	10–19
30	August 9	Charlotte	L 62–68	Katie Smith (24)	Tamika Williams (8)	Kristi Harrower (5)	Target Center	10–20
31	August 11	Los Angeles	L 58–69	Schweitzer; Smith (13)	Tamika Williams (6)	Katie Smith (6)	Target Center	10–21
32	August 13	@ Houston	L 51–63	Tamara Moore (11)	Tamika Williams (8)	Katie Smith (4)	Compaq Center	10–22

2002 season schedule

=== Season standings ===
Western Conference	W	L	PCT	Conf.	GB
Los Angeles Sparks ^{x}	25	7	.781	17–4	–
Houston Comets ^{x}	24	8	.750	16–5	1.0
Utah Starzz ^{x}	20	12	.625	12–9	5.0
Seattle Storm ^{x}	17	15	.531	10–11	8.0
Portland Fire ^{o}	16	16	.500	8–13	9.0
Sacramento Monarchs ^{o}	14	18	.438	8–13	11.0
Phoenix Mercury ^{o}	11	21	.344	7–14	14.0
Minnesota Lynx ^{o}	10	22	.313	6–15	15.0

== Statistics ==
Legend
GP	Games played	GS	Games started	MPG	Minutes per game	RPG	Rebounds per game
APG	Assists per game	SPG	Steals per game	BPG	Blocks per game	PPG	Points per game
FG%	Field-goal percentage	3P%	3-point field-goal percentage	FT%	Free-throw percentage	TO	Turnovers per game
PF	Fouls per game		Team leader		League leader

=== Regular season ===
Player	GP	GS	MPG	FG%	3P%	FT%	RPG	APG	SPG	BPG	PPG
Katie Smith	31	31	36.7	.404	.330	.824	3.0	2.5	1.0	0.2	16.5
Tamika Williams	31	31	33.0	.561	.273	.583	7.4	1.6	1.4	0.4	10.1
Svetlana Abrosimova	27	27	29.8	.377	.333	.483	5.4	2.2	1.6	0.4	11.6
Betty Lennox	5	1	27.6	.208	.217	.600	3.2	3.2	1.0	0.0	6.2
Tamara Moore	26	20	25.1	.366	.382	.830	2.9	3.0	0.9	0.3	7.5
Lynn Pride	31	15	19.0	.385	.100	.471	3.3	1.4	0.8	0.8	4.0
Kristi Harrower	27	6	17.8	.389	.333	.400	1.7	2.0	0.4	0.0	3.6
Georgia Schweitzer	30	9	17.0	.483	.424	.867	1.7	1.2	0.5	0.2	4.1
Michele Van Gorp	22	13	16.0	.456	.286	.727	2.9	0.6	0.3	0.5	4.5
Shaunzinski Gortman	29	2	12.7	.361	.326	.778	2.1	0.7	0.4	0.2	3.1
Janell Burse	31	2	11.1	.373	.000	.583	1.9	0.2	0.2	0.4	2.7
Val Whiting-Raymond	6	3	8.7	.308	N/A	.417	1.5	0.8	0.3	0.3	2.2
Shanele Stires	9	0	2.4	.500	.500	.500	0.7	0.1	0.0	0.1	0.7

^{‡}Waived/Released during the season
^{†}Traded during the season
^{≠}Acquired during the season
