= 2002 Miami Sol season =

- Head coach: Ron Rothstein
- Arena: American Airlines Arena

Results
- Record: 15–17 (.469)
- Place: 6th (Eastern)
- Playoff finish: Did not qualify

The 2002 WNBA season was the 3rd and final season for the Miami Sol. The team missed the playoffs for the second and final time in their history. The team later folded after the season due to financial issues.

== Transactions ==
=== WNBA draft ===
Round	Pick	Player	Nationality	School/Team/Country
1	15	Tamara Moore	United States	Wisconsin
2	29	Lindsey Yamasaki	United States	Stanford
3	45	Jerica Watson	United States	Iowa
4	61	Jerkisha Dosty	United States	Saint Mary's

=== Transactions ===
Date	Transaction
March 4, 2002	Traded Tracy Reid and a 2002 1st Round Pick to the Phoenix Mercury in exchange for Pollyanna Johns Kimbrough and 2002 1st Round Pick
April 19, 2002	Drafted Tamara Moore, Lindsey Yamasaki, Jerica Watson and Jerkisha Dosty in the 2002 WNBA draft
April 23, 2002	Waived Levys Torres
April 30, 2002	Signed Iziane Castro Marques and Shaka Massey
May 3, 2002	Waived Jerkisha Dosty
May 5, 2002	Traded a 2003 3rd Round Pick to the Phoenix Mercury in exchange for Claudia Neves
May 5, 2002	Signed Carolyn Moos
May 12, 2002	Waived Shaka Massey
May 16, 2002	Waived Kisha Ford
May 22, 2002	Traded Marla Brumfield and Katrina Colleton to the Portland Fire in exchange for Vanessa Nygaard
May 24, 2002	Waived Jerica Watson
June 11, 2002	Traded Tamara Moore and a 2003 2nd Round Pick to the Minnesota Lynx in exchange for Betty Lennox and a 2003 1st Round Pick
June 13, 2002	Signed Betty Lennox
June 18, 2002	Traded Marlies Askamp to the Los Angeles Sparks in exchange for a 2003 1st Round Pick
June 18, 2002	Signed Trisha Stafford-Odom
July 1, 2002	Waived Carolyn Moos

== Roster ==
2002 Miami Sol roster
Players
Coaches

Pos.	No.	Nat.	Name	Height	Weight	DOB	From	Yrs
C	14	(West Germany)	Askamp, Marlies	6' 5" (1.96m)	198 lb (90kg)	1970-07-08		5
G	31	(United States)	Black, Debbie	5' 3" (1.6m)	124 lb (56kg)	1966-07-29	Saint Joseph's	3
G	6	(Australia)	Brondello, Sandy	5' 7" (1.7m)	136 lb (62kg)	1968-08-20		3
G/F	8	(Brazil)	Castro Marques, Iziane	6' 0" (1.83m)	140 lb (64kg)	1982-03-13		R
C	41	(The Bahamas)	Johns Kimbrough, Pollyanna	6' 3" (1.91m)	165 lb (75kg)	1975-11-06	Michigan	3
G	22	(United States)	Lennox, Betty	5' 8" (1.73m)	143 lb (65kg)	1976-12-04	Louisiana Tech	2
G	30	(United States)	Moore, Tamara	5' 10" (1.78m)	176 lb (80kg)	1980-04-11	Wisconsin	R
F/C	53	(United States)	Moos, Carolyn	6' 6" (1.98m)		1978-05-23	Stanford	R
G	9	(Brazil)	Neves, Claudia	5' 8" (1.73m)	136 lb (62kg)	1975-02-17		3
F	18	(United States)	Nygaard, Vanessa	6' 1" (1.85m)	175 lb (79kg)	1975-03-13	Stanford	3
F	52	(United States)	Rasmussen, Kristen	6' 4" (1.93m)	172 lb (78kg)	1978-11-01	Michigan State	2
C	7	(United States)	Riley, Ruth	6' 5" (1.96m)	198 lb (90kg)	1979-08-28	Notre Dame	1
G/F	55	(United States)	Sam, Sheri	6' 0" (1.83m)	160 lb (73kg)	1974-05-05	Vanderbilt	3
F	5	(United States)	Stafford-Odom, Trisha	6' 0" (1.83m)	160 lb (73kg)	1970-11-11	California	1
G/F	11	(United States)	Yamasaki, Lindsey	6' 1" (1.85m)	185 lb (84kg)	1980-06-02	Stanford	R

Head coach
(United States) Ron Rothstein (Rhode Island)
Assistant coaches
(United States) Jenny Boucek
(United States) Tony Fiorentino

Legend

- (C) Team captain
- (DP) Unsigned draft pick
- (FA) Free agent
- (S) Suspended
- Injured

== Schedule ==
=== Regular season ===
2002 game log
Total: 15–17 (Home: 9–7; Road: 6–10)
May: 0–2 (Home: 0–2; Road: 0–0)

Game	Date	Team	Score	High points	High rebounds	High assists	Location Attendance	Record
1	May 28	Minnesota	L 63–66	Tamara Moore (22)	Vanessa Nygaard (6)	Tamara Moore (4)	American Airlines Arena	0–1
2	May 30	Los Angeles	L 65–69	Sandy Brondello (20)	Pollyanna Johns Kimbrough (8)	Debbie Black (5)	American Airlines Arena	0–2

June : 4–7 (Home: 2–3; Road: 2–4)

Game	Date	Team	Score	High points	High rebounds	High assists	Location Attendance	Record
3	June 2	@ New York	L 52–58	Sandy Brondello (17)	Sheri Sam (8)	Black; Moore; Rasmussen (2)	Madison Square Garden	0–3
4	June 4	Orlando	L 69–71	Pollyanna Johns Kimbrough (16)	Sheri Sam (9)	Black; Brondello (5)	American Airlines Arena	0–4
5	June 9	@ Washington	L 67–76	Sheri Sam (23)	Pollyanna Johns Kimbrough (7)	Debbie Black (9)	MCI Center	0–5
6	June 11	Cleveland	W 74–65	Sheri Sam (18)	Debbie Black (9)	Black; Sam (5)	American Airlines Arena	1–5
7	June 15	@ Orlando	W 69–65	Sheri Sam (17)	Pollyanna Johns Kimbrough (7)	Debbie Black (5)	TD Waterhouse Centre	2–5
8	June 18	Houston	L 46–53	Riley; Sam (11)	Debbie Black (7)	Black; Riley (3)	American Airlines Arena	2–6
9	June 21	Washington	L 60–65	Sheri Sam (18)	Pollyanna Johns Kimbrough (9)	Black; Sam (4)	American Airlines Arena	2–7
10	June 22	@ Charlotte	L 63–76	Betty Lennox (18)	Pollyanna Johns Kimbrough (12)	Claudia Neves (4)	Charlotte Coliseum	2–8
11	June 25	@ Cleveland	L 50–71	Betty Lennox (19)	Betty Lennox (6)	Sheri Sam (4)	Gund Arena	2–9
12	June 28	@ Detroit	W 78–74 (OT)	Sheri Sam (27)	Pollyanna Johns Kimbrough (7)	Debbie Black (6)	The Palace of Auburn Hills	3–9
13	June 30	Indiana	W 65–59	Sheri Sam (19)	Kristen Rasmussen (6)	Lennox; Sam (4)	American Airlines Arena	4–9

July : 8–6 (Home: 4–2; Road: 4–4)

Game	Date	Team	Score	High points	High rebounds	High assists	Location Attendance	Record
14	July 3	Phoenix	W 86–61	Betty Lennox (16)	Johns Kimbrough; Nygaard (6)	Debbie Black (7)	American Airlines Arena	5–9
15	July 5	Charlotte	L 68–72	Sandy Brondello (23)	Kristen Rasmussen (6)	Debbie Black (4)	American Airlines Arena	5–10
16	July 7	Seattle	W 65–61 (OT)	Betty Lennox (19)	Kristen Rasmussen (9)	Sheri Sam (7)	American Airlines Arena	6–10
17	July 9	@ Charlotte	W 66–55	Sheri Sam (23)	Sheri Sam (6)	Kristen Rasmussen (5)	Charlotte Coliseum	7–10
18	July 12	@ Indiana	W 68–62	Sheri Sam (15)	Sheri Sam (10)	Debbie Black (9)	Conseco Fieldhouse	8–10
19	July 13	Orlando	W 70–56	Betty Lennox (24)	Sheri Sam (6)	Black; Neves; Rasmussen (3)	American Airlines Arena	9–10
20	July 17	Sacramento	L 62–78	Betty Lennox (18)	Kristen Rasmussen (8)	Johns Kimbrough; Lennox (2)	American Airlines Arena	9–11
21	July 19	@ Minnesota	W 61–58	Brondello; Sam (11)	Betty Lennox (7)	Debbie Black (7)	Target Center	10–11
22	July 20	@ Detroit	L 48–69	Claudia Neves (9)	Sheri Sam (7)	Ruth Riley (2)	The Palace of Auburn Hills	10–12
23	July 23	New York	W 54–46	Sheri Sam (24)	Black; Rasmussen (8)	Debbie Black (4)	American Airlines Arena	11–12
24	July 25	@ Houston	L 60–69	Sheri Sam (17)	Sheri Sam (7)	Sheri Sam (7)	Compaq Center	11–13
25	July 27	@ Portland	L 61–71	Sheri Sam (15)	Kristen Rasmussen (7)	Debbie Black (5)	Rose Garden	11–14
26	July 30	@ Los Angeles	W 82–73	Sheri Sam (18)	Pollyanna Johns Kimbrough (7)	Debbie Black (7)	Staples Center	12–14
27	July 31	@ Utah	L 76–81 (OT)	Sheri Sam (18)	Sheri Sam (9)	Sandy Brondello (7)	Delta Center	12–15

August : 3–2 (Home: 3–0; Road: 0–2)

Game	Date	Team	Score	High points	High rebounds	High assists	Location Attendance	Record
28	August 2	@ New York	L 54–66	Kristen Rasmussen (19)	Sheri Sam (7)	Betty Lennox (4)	Madison Square Garden	12–16
29	August 4	Washington	W 55–50	Sheri Sam (13)	Ruth Riley (6)	Debbie Black (6)	American Airlines Arena	13–16
30	August 9	Cleveland	W 65–59	Sheri Sam (18)	Rasmussen; Sam (6)	Debbie Black (5)	American Airlines Arena	14–16
31	August 11	@ Indiana	L 63–77	Sheri Sam (20)	Kristen Rasmussen (5)	Debbie Black (3)	Conseco Fieldhouse	14–17
32	August 13	Detroit	W 61–56	Betty Lennox (20)	Rasmussen; Sam (7)	Debbie Black (4)	American Airlines Arena	15–17

2002 season schedule

=== Season standings ===
Eastern Conference	W	L	PCT	Conf.	GB
New York Liberty ^{x}	18	14	.563	11–10	–
Charlotte Sting ^{x}	18	14	.563	12–9	–
Washington Mystics ^{x}	17	15	.531	12–9	1.0
Indiana Fever ^{x}	16	16	.500	12–9	2.0
Orlando Miracle ^{o}	16	16	.500	13–8	2.0
Miami Sol ^{o}	15	17	.469	11–10	3.0
Cleveland Rockers ^{o}	10	22	.312	7–14	8.0
Detroit Shock ^{o}	9	23	.281	6–15	9.0

== Statistics ==
Legend
GP	Games played	GS	Games started	MPG	Minutes per game	RPG	Rebounds per game
APG	Assists per game	SPG	Steals per game	BPG	Blocks per game	PPG	Points per game
FG%	Field-goal percentage	3P%	3-point field-goal percentage	FT%	Free-throw percentage	TO	Turnovers per game
PF	Fouls per game		Team leader		League leader

=== Regular season ===
Player	GP	GS	MPG	FG%	3P%	FT%	RPG	APG	SPG	BPG	PPG
Sheri Sam	32	32	33.5	.434	.342	.618	4.8	2.6	2.2	0.2	14.5
Debbie Black	32	32	28.1	.400	.000	.758	3.8	4.3	1.8	0.2	4.8
Pollyanna Johns Kimbrough	31	30	25.8	.523	N/A	.629	4.5	1.0	0.9	0.5	7.0
Sandy Brondello	30	23	25.4	.365	.318	.821	1.4	1.5	0.9	0.1	8.8
Betty Lennox	26	3	22.3	.358	.351	.759	2.8	1.8	1.0	0.2	11.9
Kristen Rasmussen	31	5	21.7	.552	.429	.848	3.8	1.3	0.6	0.5	5.5
Ruth Riley	26	8	20.0	.465	N/A	.609	3.5	1.0	0.4	1.6	5.7
Tamara Moore	5	3	16.6	.320	.222	1.000	1.4	2.0	1.4	0.0	5.6
Vanessa Nygaard	29	22	15.3	.426	.375	.769	2.3	0.3	0.4	0.0	4.1
Marlies Askamp	6	1	12.0	.400	N/A	.273	1.8	0.5	0.2	0.2	1.8
Lindsey Yamasaki	15	0	9.8	.442	.529	.500	1.0	0.6	0.3	0.1	3.5
Claudia Neves	20	0	9.7	.355	.190	.688	0.4	1.3	0.4	0.0	1.9
Iziane Castro Marques	19	1	9.6	.333	.059	.680	0.9	0.4	0.4	0.0	3.5
Trisha Stafford-Odom	6	0	6.3	.167	N/A	.750	1.0	0.3	0.2	0.0	1.3
Carolyn Moos	2	0	3.0	.000	N/A	N/A	0.0	0.0	0.0	0.5	0.0

^{‡}Waived/Released during the season
^{†}Traded during the season
^{≠}Acquired during the season
