= 2002 Cleveland Rockers season =

- Head coach: Dan Hughes
- Arena: Gund Arena

Results
- Record: 10–22 (.313)
- Place: 7th (Eastern)
- Playoff finish: Did not qualify

The 2002 WNBA season was the 6th season for the Cleveland Rockers.

== Transactions ==
=== WNBA draft ===
Round	Pick	Player	Nationality	School/Team/Country
1	7	Deanna Jackson	United States	UAB
1	9	Brandi McCain	United States	Florida
3	41	Angie Welle	United States	Iowa State
4	57	Marche Strickland	United States	Maryland

=== Transactions ===
Date	Transaction
March 4, 2002	Traded Pollyanna Johns Kimbrough and a 2002 1st Round Pick to the Phoenix Mercury in exchange for a 2002 1st Round Pick
April 19, 2002	Drafted Deanna Jackson, Brandi McCain, Angie Welle and Marche Strickland in the 2002 WNBA draft
May 8, 2002	Waived Jameka Jones, Jannon Roland and Tere Williams
May 19, 2002	Waived Angie Welle and Marche Strickland
May 21, 2002	Waived Katryna Gaither
May 23, 2002	Waived Anastasia Kostaki
May 30, 2002	Waived Nyree Roberts
May 30, 2002	Signed Lucienne Berthieu
June 14, 2002	Waived Paige Sauer

== Roster ==
2002 Cleveland Rockers roster
Players
Coaches

Pos.	No.	Nat.	Name	Height	Weight	DOB	From	Yrs
F	23	(Portugal)	Andrade, Mery	6' 0" (1.83m)	169 lb (77kg)	1975-12-31	Old Dominion	3
G	11	(United States)	Bader Binford, Tricia	5' 4" (1.63m)	125 lb (57kg)	1973-02-26	Boise State	4
F/C	9	(Cameroon)	Berthieu, Lucienne	6' 2" (1.88m)	188 lb (85kg)	1978-03-31	Old Dominion	R
F	34	(United States)	Brown, Rushia	6' 2" (1.88m)	175 lb (79kg)	1972-05-05	Furman	5
C	47	(United States)	Henderson, Tracy	6' 3" (1.91m)	200 lb (91kg)	1974-12-31	Georgia	1
F	5	(United States)	Jackson, Deanna	6' 2" (1.88m)	155 lb (70kg)	1979-12-15	UAB	R
G	25	(United States)	Jones, Merlakia	5' 10" (1.78m)	147 lb (67kg)	1973-06-21	Florida	5
G	7	(United States)	McCain, Brandi	5' 3" (1.6m)	135 lb (61kg)	1979-09-21	Florida	R
F/C	44	(United States)	Melvin, Chasity	6' 3" (1.91m)	185 lb (84kg)	1976-05-03	NC State	3
G	21	(United States)	Rizzotti, Jennifer	5' 6" (1.68m)	146 lb (66kg)	1974-05-15	Connecticut	3
C	31	(United States)	Sauer, Paige	6' 5" (1.96m)	200 lb (91kg)	1977-12-08	Connecticut	2
F	14	(Australia)	Taylor, Penny	6' 1" (1.85m)	165 lb (75kg)	1981-05-24		1
C	12	(Belgium)	Wauters, Ann	6' 4" (1.93m)	193 lb (88kg)	1980-10-12		2

Head coach
(United States) Dan Hughes (Muskingum)
Assistant coaches
(United States) Lisa Boyer
(United States) Janice Braxton

Legend

- (C) Team captain
- (DP) Unsigned draft pick
- (FA) Free agent
- (S) Suspended
- Injured

== Schedule ==
=== Regular season ===
2002 game log
Total: 10–22 (Home: 4–12; Road: 6–10)
June: 6–7 (Home: 4–4; Road: 2–3)

Game	Date	Team	Score	High points	High rebounds	High assists	Location Attendance	Record
1	June 1	Houston	L 65–69 (OT)	Penny Taylor (24)	Penny Taylor (9)	Jennifer Rizzotti (5)	Gund Arena	0–1
2	June 6	Detroit	W 72–55	Chasity Melvin (19)	Penny Taylor (9)	Andrade; Jones (4)	Gund Arena	1–1
3	June 6	@ Orlando	L 99–103 (3OT)	Penny Taylor (27)	Merlakia Jones (8)	Jennifer Rizzotti (5)	TD Waterhouse Centre	1–2
4	June 11	@ Miami	L 65–74	Merlakia Jones (20)	Melvin; Taylor (6)	Jones; McCain; Taylor (3)	American Airlines Arena	1–3
5	June 14	Washington	L 63–69	Merlakia Jones (18)	Chasity Melvin (8)	Merlakia Jones (3)	Gund Arena	1–4
6	June 15	@ Indiana	W 79–68	Merlakia Jones (27)	Ann Wauters (6)	Brandi McCain (5)	Conseco Fieldhouse	2–4
7	June 19	Orlando	L 62–66	Merlakia Jones (14)	Merlakia Jones (7)	Jennifer Rizzotti (4)	Gund Arena	2–5
8	June 21	New York	W 80–69	Chasity Melvin (30)	Jones; Wauters (7)	Jennifer Rizzotti (14)	Gund Arena	3–5
9	June 23	@ Washington	L 45–63	Chasity Melvin (10)	Jones; Melvin; Rizzotti; Taylor (4)	Jones; Rizzotti; Taylor (2)	MCI Center	3–6
10	June 25	Miami	W 71–50	Ann Wauters (18)	Merlakia Jones (9)	Mery Andrade (4)	Gund Arena	4–6
11	June 27	Sacramento	W 73–50	Penny Taylor (24)	Chasity Melvin (12)	McCain; Taylor; Wauters (5)	Gund Arena	5–6
12	June 28	@ New York	W 67–58	Penny Taylor (20)	Merlakia Jones (7)	Andrade; Jones; McCain; Rizzotti; Taylor (2)	Madison Square Garden	6–6
13	June 30	Utah	L 62–79	Ann Wauters (20)	Ann Wauters (6)	Brown; McCain; Taylor (5)	Gund Arena	6–7

July : 3–9 (Home: 0–5; Road: 3–4)

Game	Date	Team	Score	High points	High rebounds	High assists	Location Attendance	Record
14	July 2	Portland	L 64–68	Merlakia Jones (18)	Ann Wauters (7)	Merlakia Jones (5)	Gund Arena	6–8
15	July 5	Seattle	L 65–73	Penny Taylor (16)	Brown; Jones; Melvin; Wauters (4)	Jones; Taylor (4)	Gund Arena	6–9
16	July 6	@ Charlotte	L 67–78	Merlakia Jones (17)	Jones; Wauters (6)	Penny Taylor (4)	Charlotte Coliseum	6–10
17	July 8	@ Indiana	L 57–68	Jones; Taylor (12)	Ann Wauters (6)	Merlakia Jones (3)	Conseco Fieldhouse	6–11
18	July 11	@ Sacramento	L 69–71	Ann Wauters (18)	Penny Taylor (10)	Jones; Taylor (5)	ARCO Arena	6–12
19	July 12	@ Seattle	W 62–58	Ann Wauters (16)	Chasity Melvin (12)	Mery Andrade (4)	KeyArena	7–12
20	July 17	@ Minnesota	W 58–48	Ann Wauters (14)	Chasity Melvin (12)	Jones; Rizzotti; Taylor; Wauters (2)	Target Center	8–12
21	July 20	Los Angeles	L 50–63	Penny Taylor (11)	Merlakia Jones (9)	Bader Binford; Taylor (3)	Gund Arena	8–13
22	July 22	@ New York	L 52–73	Merlakia Jones (11)	Penny Taylor (6)	Chasity Melvin (3)	Madison Square Garden	8–14
23	July 24	Charlotte	L 66–73 (OT)	Merlakia Jones (20)	Brown; Jones (8)	Jennifer Rizzotti (4)	Gund Arena	8–15
24	July 25	@ Charlotte	W 83–73	Merlakia Jones (23)	Chasity Melvin (10)	Jennifer Rizzotti (7)	Charlotte Coliseum	9–15
25	July 28	Orlando	L 70–76 (OT)	Andrea Stinson (17)	Andrea Stinson (5)	Staley; Stinson (4)	Gund Arena	9–16

August : 1–6 (Home: 0–3; Road: 1–3)

Game	Date	Team	Score	High points	High rebounds	High assists	Location Attendance	Record
26	August 1	@ Detroit	W 68–66	Chasity Melvin (20)	Merlakia Jones (8)	Merlakia Jones (5)	The Palace of Auburn Hills	10–16
27	August 3	Detroit	L 57–68	Chasity Melvin (15)	Ann Wauters (8)	Jennifer Rizzotti (4)	Gund Arena	10–17
28	August 6	@ Houston	L 54–67	Melvin; Taylor (13)	Merlakia Jones (5)	Jennifer Rizzotti (4)	Compaq Center	10–18
29	August 7	@ Phoenix	L 57–59	Ann Wauters (16)	Chasity Melvin (9)	Melvin; Rizzotti (5)	America West Arena	10–19
30	August 9	@ Miami	L 59–65	Penny Taylor (11)	Jones; Melvin (6)	Mery Andrade (4)	American Airlines Arena	10–20
31	August 11	Washington	L 54–60	Ann Wauters (12)	Melvin; Taylor (7)	Brown; Jones Rizzotti; Taylor (2)	Gund Arena	10–21
32	August 13	Indiana	L 56–60	Penny Taylor (22)	Penny Taylor (10)	Chasity Melvin (5)	Gund Arena	10–22

2002 season schedule

=== Season standings ===
Eastern Conference	W	L	PCT	Conf.	GB
New York Liberty ^{x}	18	14	.563	11–10	–
Charlotte Sting ^{x}	18	14	.563	12–9	–
Washington Mystics ^{x}	17	15	.531	12–9	1.0
Indiana Fever ^{x}	16	16	.500	12–9	2.0
Orlando Miracle ^{o}	16	16	.500	13–8	2.0
Miami Sol ^{o}	15	17	.469	11–10	3.0
Cleveland Rockers ^{o}	10	22	.312	7–14	8.0
Detroit Shock ^{o}	9	23	.281	6–15	9.0

== Statistics ==
Legend
GP	Games played	GS	Games started	MPG	Minutes per game	RPG	Rebounds per game
APG	Assists per game	SPG	Steals per game	BPG	Blocks per game	PPG	Points per game
FG%	Field-goal percentage	3P%	3-point field-goal percentage	FT%	Free-throw percentage	TO	Turnovers per game
PF	Fouls per game		Team leader		League leader

=== Regular season ===
Player	GP	GS	MPG	FG%	3P%	FT%	RPG	APG	SPG	BPG	PPG
Merlakia Jones	32	32	34.2	.399	.278	.785	5.5	2.3	1.4	0.1	12.2
Chasity Melvin	32	32	33.0	.464	.500	.687	6.0	1.8	0.9	0.6	12.5
Penny Taylor	30	26	30.3	.416	.342	.853	5.3	2.3	1.2	0.4	13.0
Ann Wauters	28	25	28.6	.553	.000	.851	5.0	1.4	0.6	0.8	11.2
Jennifer Rizzotti	26	25	26.7	.400	.384	.800	2.7	3.3	0.9	0.1	6.8
Mery Andrade	32	16	20.8	.306	.192	.783	1.8	2.1	0.9	0.2	2.8
Rushia Brown	28	2	16.7	.400	.000	.737	2.7	1.0	0.8	0.3	4.0
Brandi McCain	31	2	12.6	.291	.362	.750	0.8	1.3	0.4	0.1	2.7
Deanna Jackson	18	0	7.9	.413	.000	.708	1.5	0.3	0.1	0.1	3.1
Tracy Henderson	23	0	7.5	.390	N/A	1.000	1.5	0.1	0.1	0.3	1.5
Tricia Bader Binford	18	0	7.3	.154	.071	.833	0.4	0.8	0.3	0.1	0.8
Paige Sauer	1	0	7.0	.000	N/A	N/A	2.0	0.0	1.0	0.0	0.0
Lucienne Berthieu	5	0	3.2	.429	.000	.500	0.8	0.0	0.0	0.0	1.6

^{‡}Waived/Released during the season
^{†}Traded during the season
^{≠}Acquired during the season
