= 2002 Portland Fire season =

- Head coach: Linda Hargrove
- Arena: Rose Garden

Results
- Record: 16–16 (.500)
- Place: 5th (Western)
- Playoff finish: Did not qualify

The 2002 WNBA season was the 3rd and final season for the original incarnation of the Portland Fire franchise. The team improved compared from their first two seasons, but playoff hopes were denied when they finished one game back for a playoff berth. The team later folded after the season.

The city of Portland would return to the WNBA twenty-four seasons later with the expansion revival of Portland Fire, will begin play in the 2026 season.

== Offseason ==
=== WNBA draft ===
Round	Pick	Player	Nationality	College/School/Team
1	5	Nikki Teasley (G)	United States	North Carolina
3	37	Mandy Nightingale (G)	United States	Colorado
4	50	Melody Johnson (C)	United States	Arizona State
4	53	Monique Cardenas (G)	United States	Florida

== Regular season ==
=== Season standings ===
Western Conference	W	L	PCT	Conf.	GB
Los Angeles Sparks ^{x}	25	7	.781	17–4	–
Houston Comets ^{x}	24	8	.750	16–5	1.0
Utah Starzz ^{x}	20	12	.625	12–9	5.0
Seattle Storm ^{x}	17	15	.531	10–11	8.0
Portland Fire ^{o}	16	16	.500	8–13	9.0
Sacramento Monarchs ^{o}	14	18	.438	8–13	11.0
Phoenix Mercury ^{o}	11	21	.344	7–14	14.0
Minnesota Lynx ^{o}	10	22	.313	6–15	15.0

=== Season schedule ===
Date	Opponent	Score	Result	Record
1	May 29	New York	L 62–84	0–1
2	May 30	@ Utah	L 64–69	0–2
3	June 2	Seattle	L 47–57	0–3
4	June 3	@ Los Angeles	L 72–89	0–4
5	June 6	Sacramento	W 86–73	1–4
6	June 11	@ Seattle	W 70–63	2–4
7	June 13	@ Minnesota	L 46–60	2–5
8	June 15	Detroit	W 67–60	3–5
9	June 18	Minnesota	W 59–51	4–5
10	June 20	Indiana	L 72–81	4–6
11	June 23	Houston	L 58–71	4–7
12	June 25	@ Utah	L 83–86	4–8
13	June 26	Orlando	W 64–57	5–8
14	June 28	Washington	W 72–66	6–8
15	June 30	@ New York	W 54–44	7–8
16	July 2	@ Cleveland	W 68–64	8–8
17	July 3	@ Charlotte	W 76–73	9–8
18	July 7	Sacramento	W 74–59	10–8
19	July 10	@ Minnesota	W 75–72	11–8
20	July 12	Los Angeles	L 76–82 (OT)	11–9
21	July 17	Phoenix	W 73–61	12–9
22	July 19	Houston	W 70–60	13–9
23	July 21	@ Phoenix	W 87–75	14–9
24	July 24	@ Los Angeles	L 69–73	14–10
25	July 25	@ Sacramento	L 80–81 (OT)	14–11
26	July 27	Miami	W 71–61	15–11
27	July 30	@ Houston	L 59–89	15–12
28	August 2	@ Washington	W 67–65	16–12
29	August 4	@ Orlando	L 61–63	16–13
30	August 6	Utah	L 69–82	16–14
31	August 9	@ Seattle	L 74–83	16–15
32	August 11	Phoenix	L 70–73	16–16

== Player stats ==
Note: GP = Games Played; REB = Rebounds; AST = Assists; STL = Steals; BLK = Blocks; PTS = Points

Player	GP	REB	AST	STL	BLK	PTS
DeMya Walker	31	154	51	26	33	339
Tamicha Jackson	32	59	95	55	1	314
Sylvia Crawley	32	134	47	18	37	279
Alisa Burras	32	147	7	10	7	278
Ukari Figgs	31	80	104	25	2	264
Kristin Folkl	32	148	32	18	17	155
Stacey Thomas	32	94	67	42	12	143
Jackie Stiles	21	18	20	4	0	125
LaQuanda Barksdale	17	40	12	8	7	100
Tully Bevilaqua	27	33	44	22	3	84
Carolyn Young	19	14	12	4	0	83
Amber Hall	20	26	1	7	1	30
Jenny Mowe	5	1	0	0	0	1
