= 2002 Sacramento Monarchs season =

- Head coach: Maura McHugh
- Arena: ARCO Arena

Results
- Record: 14–18 (.438)
- Place: 6th (Western)
- Playoff finish: Did not qualify

The 2002 WNBA season was the 6th season for the Sacramento Monarchs. The team missed the playoffs for the first time in four years.

== Offseason ==
=== WNBA draft ===
Round	Pick	Player	Nationality	College/School/Team
1	12	Hamchétou Maïga (G/F)	Mali	Old Dominion
3	44	Alayne Ingram (G)	United States	Michigan
4	51	Jermisha Dosty (C)	United States	St. Mary's (CA)
4	60	Elizabeth Pickney (F)	United States	Arizona

== Regular season ==
=== Season standings ===
Western Conference	W	L	PCT	Conf.	GB
Los Angeles Sparks ^{x}	25	7	.781	17–4	–
Houston Comets ^{x}	24	8	.750	16–5	1.0
Utah Starzz ^{x}	20	12	.625	12–9	5.0
Seattle Storm ^{x}	17	15	.531	10–11	8.0
Portland Fire ^{o}	16	16	.500	8–13	9.0
Sacramento Monarchs ^{o}	14	18	.438	8–13	11.0
Phoenix Mercury ^{o}	11	21	.344	7–14	14.0
Minnesota Lynx ^{o}	10	22	.313	6–15	15.0

=== Season schedule ===
Date	Opponent	Score	Result	Record
1	June 1	Minnesota	L 61–63	0–1
2	June 6	@ Portland	L 73–86	0–2
3	June 9	@ Houston	L 62–75	0–3
4	June 11	@ Minnesota	L 63–72	0–4
5	June 13	New York	W 78–77 (OT)	1–4
6	June 15	Los Angeles	L 66–72 (OT)	1–5
7	June 18	@ Phoenix	L 63–78	1–6
8	June 20	Seattle	W 72–64	2–6
9	June 22	Utah	L 61–77	2–7
10	June 23	@ Seattle	L 60–86	2–8
11	June 25	Washington	L 86–87 (OT)	2–9
12	June 27	@ Cleveland	L 50–73	2–10
13	June 28	@ Indiana	L 60–67	2–11
14	June 30	@ Detroit	L 60–71	2–12
15	July 5	@ Los Angeles	L 65–87	2–13
16	July 7	@ Portland	L 59–74	2–14
17	July 11	Cleveland	W 71–69	3–14
18	July 12	Houston	L 60–74	3–15
19	July 17	@ Miami	W 78–62	4–15
20	July 19	@ Charlotte	L 51–70	4–16
21	July 21	Orlando	W 62–60	5–16
22	July 25	Portland	W 81–80 (OT)	6–16
23	July 27	@ Phoenix	W 79–64	7–16
24	July 28	Minnesota	W 66–56	8–16
25	July 30	Indiana	W 74–65	9–16
26	August 1	Utah	W 80–71	10–16
27	August 3	Los Angeles	L 71–81	10–17
28	August 6	Phoenix	W 73–70	11–17
29	August 8	@ Orlando	W 82–72	12–17
30	August 10	@ Houston	W 61–59	13–17
31	August 12	@ Utah	L 79–81	13–18
32	August 13	Seattle	W 59–51	14–18

== Player stats ==
Player	GP	REB	AST	STL	BLK	PTS
Tangela Smith	32	188	40	27	46	469
Ruthie Bolton	32	94	37	45	2	349
Kedra Holland-Corn	32	90	63	41	5	296
Yolanda Griffith	17	148	19	16	13	288
Lady Grooms	32	99	39	21	8	227
Ticha Penicheiro	24	102	192	64	1	203
La'Keshia Frett	32	95	23	5	19	187
Cass Bauer-Bilodeau	25	41	1	2	5	43
Hamchetou Maiga-Ba	23	37	9	15	3	40
Andrea Nagy	24	29	73	10	4	34
Kara Wolters	14	23	3	0	3	24
Edna Campbell	1	1	0	1	0	4
Stacey Ford	5	2	1	0	0	2
Monique Ambers	2	0	0	0	0	0
