= Davalyn Cunningham =

American basketball player

Personal information
- Born: January 27, 1980 (age 46)
- Listed height: 6 ft 0 in (1.83 m)
- Listed weight: 187 lb (85 kg)

Career information
- High school: St. John's College HS (Washington, D.C.)
- College: Rutgers (1998–2002)
- WNBA draft: 2002: 2nd round, 23rd overall pick
- Drafted by: Orlando Miracle
- Position: Forward

Career history
- 2002: Orlando Miracle
- Stats at WNBA.com
- Stats at Basketball Reference

Davalyn Cunningham (born January 27, 1980) is an American former professional basketball player who played for the Orlando Miracle.

== Career statistics ==
Legend
GP	Games played	GS	Games started	MPG	Minutes per game	RPG	Rebounds per game
APG	Assists per game	SPG	Steals per game	BPG	Blocks per game	PPG	Points per game
TO	Turnovers per game	FG%	Field-goal percentage	3P%	3-point field-goal percentage	FT%	Free-throw percentage
**Bold**	Career best	°	League leader

=== WNBA ===
WNBA regular season statistics
Year	Team	GP	GS	MPG	FG%	3P%	FT%	RPG	APG	SPG	BPG	TO	PPG
2002	Orlando	6	0	3.5	0.0	—	—	0.3	0.0	0.3	0.0	0.2	0.0
**Career**	1 year, 1 team	6	0	3.5	0.0	—	—	0.3	0.0	0.3	0.0	0.2	0.0

=== College ===
NCAA statistics
Year	Team	GP	Points	FG%	3P%	FT%	RPG	APG	SPG	BPG	PPG
1998–99	Rutgers	33	141	**50.9%**	—	0.6%	3.2	0.2	0.9	0.2	4.3
1999–00	Rutgers	**34**	182	46.1%	0.0%	59.6%	3.4	0.4	0.8	0.2	5.4
2000–01	Rutgers	31	**303**	49.0%	0.0%	66.3%	4.6	0.8	1.3	0.1	9.8
2001–02	Rutgers	25	257	45.1%	—	**69.6%**	**7.5**	**1.2**	**1.8**	0.2	**10.3**
**Career**		123	883	47.5%	0.0%	64.3%	4.5	0.6	1.1	0.2	7.2

== Personal life ==
Cunningham has a younger brother, Dante, who also played in the NBA
