= 2002 Utah Starzz season =

- Head coach: Candi Harvey
- Arena: Delta Center

Results
- Record: 20–12 (.625)
- Place: 3rd (Western)
- Playoff finish: Lost Conference Finals (2-0) to Los Angeles Sparks

The 2002 WNBA season was the 6th season and their last in Utah. They won their first playoff series with a 1st round victory over the Houston Comets, but lost in a sweep to the Los Angeles Sparks in the West Finals. After the season, the team relocated to San Antonio, Texas to become the San Antonio Silver Stars.

== Offseason ==
=== WNBA draft ===
Round	Pick	Player	Nationality	College/School/Team
1	11	Danielle Crockrom (F)	United States	Baylor
1	14	LaNeishea Caufield (G)	United States	Oklahoma
2	27	Andrea Gardner (F/C)	United States	Howard
3	43	Edmarie Lumbsley (C)	United States	Mobile
4	59	Jaclyn Winfield (G)	United States	Southern

== Regular season ==
=== Season standings ===
Western Conference	W	L	PCT	Conf.	GB
Los Angeles Sparks ^{x}	25	7	.781	17–4	–
Houston Comets ^{x}	24	8	.750	16–5	1.0
Utah Starzz ^{x}	20	12	.625	12–9	5.0
Seattle Storm ^{x}	17	15	.531	10–11	8.0
Portland Fire ^{o}	16	16	.500	8–13	9.0
Sacramento Monarchs ^{o}	14	18	.438	8–13	11.0
Phoenix Mercury ^{o}	11	21	.344	7–14	14.0
Minnesota Lynx ^{o}	10	22	.313	6–15	15.0

=== Season schedule ===
Game	Date	Opponent	Result	Record
1	May 25	@ Minnesota	W 79–75 (OT)	1–0
2	May 30	Portland	W 69–64	2–0
3	June 1	@ Phoenix	L 66–71	2–1
4	June 4	Washington	L 89–97	2–2
5	June 8	Charlotte	W 69–64	3–2
6	June 9	@ Seattle	W 71–68	4–2
7	June 11	New York	L 68–71	4–3
8	June 15	Seattle	W 61–54	5–3
9	June 18	Indiana	W 79–71	6–3
10	June 22	@ Sacramento	W 77–61	7–3
11	June 25	Portland	W 86–83	8–3
12	June 28	@ Houston	L 57–73	8–4
13	June 30	@ Cleveland	W 79–62	9–4
14	July 3	Houston	L 67–78	9–5
15	July 5	Minnesota	W 87–56	10–5
16	July 7	@ Los Angeles	L 75–102	10–6
17	July 8	Detroit	W 94–76	11–6
18	July 10	@ Indiana	W 82–69	12–6
19	July 13	Phoenix	W 75–66	13–6
20	July 17	Houston	W 75–67	14–6
21	July 19	@ Orlando	L 73–84	14–7
22	July 20	@ Washington	W 83–73	15–7
23	July 23	@ Detroit	W 86–75	16–7
24	July 24	@ Minnesota	L 62–70	16–8
25	July 26	Phoenix	W 74–61	17–8
26	July 31	Miami	W 81–76 (OT)	18–8
27	August 1	@ Sacramento	L 71–80	18–9
28	August 4	@ Los Angeles	L 86–90	18–10
29	August 6	@ Portland	W 82–69	19–10
30	August 9	Los Angeles	L 77–85	19–11
31	August 11	@ Seattle	L 57–74	19–12
32	August 12	Sacramento	W 81–79	20–12
1	August 16	Houston	W 66–59	1–0
2	August 18	@ Houston	L 77–83 (OT)	1–1
3	August 20	@ Houston	W 75–72	2–1
1	August 22	Los Angeles	L 67–75	2–2
2	August 24	@ Los Angeles	L 77–103	2–3

== Player stats ==
Player	GP	REB	AST	STL	BLK	PTS
Adrienne Goodson	32	181	67	45	6	503
Marie Ferdinand-Harris	32	107	91	51	7	489
Margo Dydek	30	262	71	25	107	394
Natalie Williams	31	255	38	38	16	351
Jennifer Azzi	32	69	158	27	14	306
LaTonya Johnson	28	19	10	7	2	75
Amy Herrig	28	57	4	9	14	68
Semeka Randall	8	21	8	4	1	58
Andrea Gardner	30	61	5	3	3	57
Elisa Aguilar	28	11	16	3	2	43
Danielle Crockrom	18	13	2	0	2	29
Kate Starbird	15	7	7	9	4	26
LaNeishea Caufield	8	5	1	7	0	19
