= 2002 Seattle Storm season =

- Head coach: Lin Dunn
- Arena: KeyArena

Results
- Record: 17–15 (.531)
- Place: 4th (Western)
- Playoff finish: Lost Western Conference Semifinals (0-2) to Los Angeles Sparks

The 2002 WNBA season was the third season for the Seattle Storm basketball team. They made to the playoffs for the first time, but losing to the Los Angeles Sparks in a sweep, who went on to win the WNBA Finals for the second year in a row. The Storm beat the Portland Fire by 1 game for the final spot, which the Fire would later cease operations.

== Offseason ==
=== WNBA draft ===
Sue Bird was among four of the top six draft picks, (along with Swin Cash (#2), Asjha Jones (#4) and Tamika (Williams) Raymond (#6) ) that were from the same team, the 2002 NCAA Champion University of Connecticut.

Pick	Player	Nationality	School/Club team
1	Sue Bird	United States	University of Connecticut
19	Lucienne Berthieu		
28	Felicia Ragland		
35	Takeisha Lewis		

== Regular season ==
=== Season standings ===
Western Conference	W	L	PCT	Conf.	GB
Los Angeles Sparks ^{x}	25	7	.781	17–4	–
Houston Comets ^{x}	24	8	.750	16–5	1.0
Utah Starzz ^{x}	20	12	.625	12–9	5.0
Seattle Storm ^{x}	17	15	.531	10–11	8.0
Portland Fire ^{o}	16	16	.500	8–13	9.0
Sacramento Monarchs ^{o}	14	18	.438	8–13	11.0
Phoenix Mercury ^{o}	11	21	.344	7–14	14.0
Minnesota Lynx ^{o}	10	22	.313	6–15	15.0

=== Season schedule ===
Game	Date	Opponent	Result	Record
1	May 30	New York	L 61–78	0–1
2	June 2	at Portland	W 57–47	1–1
3	June 4	Minnesota	W 78–68 (OT)	2–1
4	June 6	Charlotte	W 65–59	3–1
5	June 9	Utah	L 68–71	3–2
6	June 11	Portland	L 63–70	3–3
7	June 14	at Phoenix	W 90–82	4–3
8	June 15	at Utah	L 54–61	4–4
9	June 18	Los Angeles	L 68–80	4–5
10	June 20	at Sacramento	L 64–72	4–6
11	June 21	Indiana	W 63–51	5–6
12	June 23	Sacramento	W 86–60	6–6
13	June 26	at Phoenix	L 53–62	6–7
14	June 27	Orlando	W 73–71	7–7
15	July 2	at New York	L 63–74	7–8
16	July 5	at Cleveland	W 73–65	8–8
17	July 7	at Miami	L 61–65 (OT)	8–9
18	July 9	at Houston	L 59–67	8–10
19	July 11	Los Angeles	W 79–60	9–10
20	July 12	Cleveland	L 58–62	9–11
21	July 19	Phoenix	W 89–48	10–11
22	July 20	Houston	L 54–56	10–12
23	July 23	at Houston	L 54–66	10–13
24	July 25	at Orlando	W 79–76	11–13
25	July 27	at Washington	W 80–71	12–13
26	July 28	at Detroit	W 72–59	13–13
27	July 31	Minnesota	W 75–63	14–13
28	August 1	at Los Angeles	W 81–76	15–13
29	August 4	at Minnesota	L 60–73	15–14
30	August 9	Portland	W 83–74	16–14
31	August 11	Utah	W 74–57	17–14
32	August 13	at Sacramento	L 51–59	17–15

Game	Date	Opponent	Result	Record
1	August 15	Los Angeles	L 61–78	0–1
2	August 17	at Los Angeles	L 59–69	0–2

== Player stats ==
Player	GP	REB	AST	STL	BLK	PTS
Lauren Jackson	28	190	41	30	81	482
Sue Bird	32	83	191	55	3	461
Kamila Vodičková	32	176	47	36	18	295
Simone Edwards	32	141	19	21	12	223
Felicia Ragland	31	48	23	27	1	141
Semeka Randall	21	68	29	20	1	134
Amanda Lassiter	24	63	55	27	19	126
Adia Barnes	26	102	28	32	9	90
Michelle Marciniak	23	28	38	11	2	72
Kate Starbird	9	19	12	6	4	53
Jamie Redd	10	13	7	2	0	52
Kate Paye	19	7	5	3	0	21
Takeisha Lewis	14	24	3	2	0	18
Sonja Henning	8	26	15	9	1	18
Danielle McCulley	4	7	1	1	0	2
