= 2002 Washington Mystics season =

- Head coach: Marianne Stanley
- Arena: MCI Center

Results
- Record: 17–15 (.531)
- Place: 3rd (East)
- Playoff finish: Lost Conference Finals

The 2002 WNBA season was the fifth for the Washington Mystics. This was the first time in franchise history (and, until 2017, the only) that the Mystics won a playoff series. None of Washington's "big four" teams would accomplish the feat of reaching the semifinals in their respective leagues until the Washington Capitals won their first Stanley Cup, with the only trips to the semifinals between Capitals' Stanley Cups being this season and 2017 for the Mystics.

== Offseason ==
=== WNBA draft ===
Round	Pick	Player	Position	Nationality	College
First round	3rd pick overall	Stacey Dales-Schuman		Canada	
First round	4th pick overall	Asjha Jones	Forward	United States	University of Connecticut
Third Round	33rd pick overall	LaNisha Cartwell			
Third Round	36th pick overall	Teresa Geter			

== Regular season ==
=== Season standings ===
Eastern Conference	W	L	PCT	Conf.	GB
New York Liberty ^{x}	18	14	.563	11–10	–
Charlotte Sting ^{x}	18	14	.563	12–9	–
Washington Mystics ^{x}	17	15	.531	12–9	1.0
Indiana Fever ^{x}	16	16	.500	12–9	2.0
Orlando Miracle ^{o}	16	16	.500	13–8	2.0
Miami Sol ^{o}	15	17	.469	11–10	3.0
Cleveland Rockers ^{o}	10	22	.312	7–14	8.0
Detroit Shock ^{o}	9	23	.281	6–15	9.0

=== Season schedule ===
Game	Date	Opponent	Result	Record
1	June 1	Orlando	W 93–82	1–0
2	June 3	@ Phoenix	L 65–71	1–1
3	June 4	@ Utah	W 97–89	2–1
4	June 7	Indiana	W 89–68	3–1
5	June 9	Miami	W 76–67	4–1
6	June 13	Houston	W 70–64	5–1
7	June 14	@ Cleveland	W 69–63	6–1
8	June 18	Detroit	W 75–67	7–1
9	June 19	@ Charlotte	L 64–78	7–2
10	June 21	@ Miami	W 65–60	8–2
11	June 23	Cleveland	W 63–45	9–2
12	June 25	@ Sacramento	W 87–86 (OT)	10–2
13	June 27	@ Los Angeles	L 69–73	10–3
14	June 28	@ Portland	L 66–72	10–4
15	June 30	Charlotte	W 56–55	11–4
16	July 3	@ Minnesota	W 64–63	12–4
17	July 6	@ Indiana	L 45–50	12–5
18	July 8	@ Orlando	W 63–51	13–5
19	July 9	Phoenix	W 68–54	14–5
20	July 13	New York	L 53–67	14–6
21	July 18	Detroit	W 63–59	15–6
22	July 20	Utah	L 73–83	15–7
23	July 25	@ Detroit	L 58–64	15–8
24	July 27	Seattle	L 71–80	15–9
25	July 30	Orlando	L 55–70	15–10
26	August 2	Portland	L 65–67	15–11
27	August 4	@ Miami	L 50–55	15–12
28	August 6	Indiana	L 55–64	15–13
29	August 8	@ New York	W 65–54	16–13
30	August 9	New York	L 66–74	16–14
31	August 11	@ Cleveland	W 60–54	17–14
32	August 13	@ Charlotte	L 57–67	17–15
1	August 15	Charlotte	W 74–62	1–0
2	August 17	@ Charlotte	W 62–59	2–0
1	August 22	New York	W 79–74	3–0
2	August 24	@ New York	L 79–96	3–1
3	August 25	@ New York	L 57–64	3–2

== Player stats ==
Note: GP= Games played; MIN= Minutes; REB= Rebounds; AST= Assists; STL = Steals; BLK = Blocks; PTS = Points; AVG = Average

== Playoffs ==
- Won WNBA Eastern Conference Semifinals (2-0) over Charlotte Sting
- Lost WNBA Eastern Conference Finals (2-1) to New York Liberty

== Awards and honors ==
- Coco Miller, WNBA Most Improved Player Award
- Chamique Holdsclaw, WNBA Peak Performer
- Marianne Stanley, WNBA Coach of the Year Award
