= 2002 Orlando Miracle season =

- Head coach: Dee Brown
- Arena: TD Waterhouse Centre

Results
- Record: 16–16 (.500)
- Place: 5th (Eastern)
- Playoff finish: Did not qualify

The 2002 WNBA season was their fourth season and their last in Orlando. The Miracle missed out of the playoffs by losing in a tiebreaker to the Indiana Fever. It was also the final season in Orlando.

== Offseason ==
=== WNBA draft ===
Round	Pick	Player	Nationality	School/Team/Country
2	23	Davalyn Cunningham	United States	Rutgers
3	39	Saundra Jackson	United States	Mississippi
4	55	Tomeka Brown	United States	Ohio State

=== Transactions ===
- May 24: The Miracle waived Andrea Congreaves and Anna Zimerle.
- May 22: The Miracle waived E.C. Hill and Saundra Jackson.
- May 18: The Miracle waived Tawona Alhaleem and Tomeka Brown.
- May 12: The Miracle waived Jaclyn Johnson.
- May 5: The Miracle waived Naomi Mulitauaopele, Alissa Murphy and Monika Roberts.
- May 4: The Miracle waived Darene Thomas.
- April 18: The Miracle acquired Clarisse Machanguana from the Charlotte Sting in exchange for a first-round pick (seventh overall) in the 2002 Draft.

== Roster ==
2002 Orlando Miracle roster
Players
Coaches

Pos.	No.	Nat.	Name	Height	Weight	From
F	50	(United States)	Cunningham, Davalyn	6' 0" (1.83m)	187 lb (85kg)	Rutgers
C	28	(Brazil)	dos Santos, Cintia	6' 5" (1.96m)	187 lb (85kg)	Brazil
G/F	32	(United States)	Douglas, Katie	6' 0" (1.83m)	165 lb (75kg)	Purdue
F/C	7	(United States)	Hicks, Jessie	6' 4" (1.93m)	188 lb (85kg)	Maryland
G	31	(United States)	Johnson, Adrienne	5' 10" (1.78m)	154 lb (70kg)	Ohio State
G	14	(United States)	Johnson, Shannon	5' 7" (1.7m)	152 lb (69kg)	South Carolina
C	00	(Mozambique)	Machanguana, Clarisse	6' 5" (1.96m)	180 lb (82kg)	Old Dominion
G/F	12	(United States)	McCain, Tiffany	5' 10" (1.78m)	167 lb (76kg)	Kentucky
F	10	(United States)	McGhee, Carla	6' 1" (1.85m)	179 lb (81kg)	Tennessee
F/C	11	(United States)	McWilliams, Taj (C)	6' 2" (1.88m)	184 lb (83kg)	St. Edward's College
F	3	(United States)	Palmer-Daniel, Wendy	6' 2" (1.88m)	165 lb (75kg)	Virginia
G/F	42	(United States)	Sales, Nykesha (C)	6' 0" (1.83m)	175 lb (79kg)	Connecticut
F	21	(United States)	Wyckoff, Brooke	6' 1" (1.85m)	183 lb (83kg)	Florida State

Head coach
(United States) Dee Brown (Jacksonville)
Assistant coaches
(United States) Vonn Read (Clark Atlanta)
(United States) Valerie Still (Kentucky)

Legend

- (C) Team captain
- (DP) Unsigned draft pick
- (FA) Free agent
- (S) Suspended
- Injured

== Season standings ==
Eastern Conference	W	L	PCT	Conf.	GB
New York Liberty ^{x}	18	14	.563	11–10	–
Charlotte Sting ^{x}	18	14	.563	12–9	–
Washington Mystics ^{x}	17	15	.531	12–9	1.0
Indiana Fever ^{x}	16	16	.500	12–9	2.0
Orlando Miracle ^{o}	16	16	.500	13–8	2.0
Miami Sol ^{o}	15	17	.469	11–10	3.0
Cleveland Rockers ^{o}	10	22	.312	7–14	8.0
Detroit Shock ^{o}	9	23	.281	6–15	9.0

== Schedule ==
=== Preseason ===
Game	Date	Opponent	Result	Record
1	May 11	Miami	W 67–59	1–0
2	May 19	Los Angeles	L 75–85	1–1
3	May 21	@ Houston	W 61–56	2–1

=== Regular season ===
Game	Date	Opponent	Result	Record
1	May 30	Detroit	W 80–66	1–0
2	June 1	@ Washington	L 82–93	1–1
3	June 4	@ Miami	W 71–69	2–1
4	June 8	Cleveland	W 103–99 (3OT)	3–1
5	June 11	Indiana	L 69–75	3–2
6	June 15	Miami	L 65–69	3–3
7	June 18	@ New York	W 71–62	4–3
8	June 19	@ Cleveland	W 66–62	5–3
9	June 21	@ Detroit	W 80–59	6–3
10	June 23	New York	W 77–65	7–3
11	June 26	@ Portland	L 57–64	7–4
12	June 27	@ Seattle	L 71–73	7–5
13	June 29	@ Minnesota	L 59–67	7–6
14	July 3	Indiana	W 79–71 (OT)	8–6
15	July 6	Phoenix	W 72–70	9–6
16	July 8	Washington	L 51–63	9–7
17	July 12	Charlotte	L 67–72	9–8
18	July 13	@ Miami	L 56–70	9–9
19	July 17	@ Charlotte	L 62–89	9–10
20	July 19	Utah	W 84–73	10–10
21	July 21	@ Sacramento	L 60–62	10–11
22	July 22	@ Los Angeles	L 84–92	10–12
23	July 25	Seattle	L 76–79	10–13
24	July 28	@ Cleveland	W 76–70 (OT)	11–13
25	July 30	@ Washington	W 70–55	12–13
26	August 1	Charlotte	W 65–63	13–13
27	August 3	@ Houston	L 62–69	13–14
28	August 4	Portland	W 63–61	14–14
29	August 7	@ Indiana	L 63–70	14–15
30	August 8	@ Sacramento	L 72–82	14–16
31	August 11	Detroit	W 71–58	15–16
32	August 13	New York	W 70–63	16–16

=== Playoffs ===
The Miracle tied for fourth place with the Indiana Fever. However, the Miracle lost two of the three regular season meetings with the Fever and therefore, the Fever took fourth place and advanced to the postseason for the first time ever.

== Depth ==
Pos.	Starting 5	Bench 1	Bench 2	Inactive
C	Clarisse Machanguana	Jessie Hicks	Cintia dos Santos
PF	Taj McWilliams-Franklin	Wendy Palmer-Daniel		Davalyn Cunningham
SF	Katie Douglas	Brooke Wyckoff		Carla McGhee
SG	Nykesha Sales	Adrienne Johnson
PG	Shannon Johnson	Tiffany McCain

== Player stats ==
- https://www.wnba.com/sun/stats/2002/

== Awards and honors ==
- Shannon Johnson and Nykesha Sales were named to the WNBA All-Star team.
- Shannon Johnson was named WNBA Player of the Week for the week of June 9.
- Nykesha Sales was named WNBA Player of the Week for the week of June 23.
- Shannon Johnson was named to the All-WNBA Second Team for the third time in her career.
