= 2002 Phoenix Mercury season =

- Head coach: Cynthia Cooper; Linda Sharp (interim)
- Arena: America West Arena

Results
- Record: 11–21 (.344)
- Place: 7th (Western)
- Playoff finish: Did not qualify

The 2002 WNBA season was the sixth season for the Phoenix Mercury. The Mercury's head coach, Cynthia Cooper, resigned during the season.

== Offseason ==
=== WNBA draft ===
Round	Pick	Player	Nationality	College/School/Team
2	25	Tootie Shaw (F)	United States	Wichita State
3	40	Kayte Christensen (F)	United States	UC-Santa Barbara
4	56	Amba Kongolo (F/C)	United States	North Carolina Central

== Regular season ==
=== Season standings ===
Western Conference	W	L	PCT	Conf.	GB
Los Angeles Sparks ^{x}	25	7	.781	17–4	–
Houston Comets ^{x}	24	8	.750	16–5	1.0
Utah Starzz ^{x}	20	12	.625	12–9	5.0
Seattle Storm ^{x}	17	15	.531	10–11	8.0
Portland Fire ^{o}	16	16	.500	8–13	9.0
Sacramento Monarchs ^{o}	14	18	.438	8–13	11.0
Phoenix Mercury ^{o}	11	21	.344	7–14	14.0
Minnesota Lynx ^{o}	10	22	.313	6–15	15.0

=== Season schedule ===
Game	Date	Opponent	Result	Record
1	May 29	@ Houston	L 56–61	0–1
2	June 1	Utah	W 71–66	1–1
3	June 3	Washington	W 71–65	2–1
4	June 9	Charlotte	W 80–77	3–1
5	June 13	Detroit	W 70–67	4–1
6	June 14	Seattle	L 82–90	4–2
7	June 18	Sacramento	W 78–63	5–2
8	June 21	@ Houston	L 59–61	5–3
9	June 23	Minnesota	W 70–61	6–3
10	June 25	@ Los Angeles	L 66–89	6–4
11	June 26	Seattle	W 62–53	7–4
12	June 28	Los Angeles	L 72–84	7–5
13	July 1	@ Charlotte	L 68–90	7–6
14	July 3	@ Miami	L 61–86	7–7
15	July 6	@ Orlando	L 70–72	7–8
16	July 8	@ New York	L 71–77	7–9
17	July 9	@ Washington	L 54–68	7–10
18	July 11	Houston	W 58–52	8–10
19	July 13	@ Utah	L 66–75	8–11
20	July 17	@ Portland	L 61–73	8–12
21	July 19	@ Seattle	L 48–89	8–13
22	July 21	Portland	L 75–87	8–14
23	July 26	@ Utah	L 61–74	8–15
24	July 27	Sacramento	L 64–79	8–16
25	July 29	Minnesota	W 57–46	9–16
26	July 31	Indiana	L 56–58	9–17
27	August 2	@ Minnesota	L 51–75	9–18
28	August 4	@ Detroit	L 75–91	9–19
29	August 6	@ Sacramento	L 70–73	9–20
30	August 7	Cleveland	W 59–57	10–20
31	August 11	@ Portland	W 73–70	11–20
32	August 13	Los Angeles	L 56–63	11–21

== Player stats ==
Player	GP	REB	AST	STL	BLK	PTS
Jennifer Gillom	31	116	37	29	21	473
Gordana Grubin	32	64	104	36	3	317
Lisa Harrison	32	126	40	31	3	262
Adrian Williams	32	220	35	48	29	200
Adriana Moises Pinto	32	60	79	30	3	193
Kayte Christensen	30	80	15	24	13	120
Tracy Reid	24	77	14	22	2	113
Susanna Bonfiglio	22	37	23	12	0	105
Jaynetta Saunders	27	38	23	9	4	99
Slobodanka Tuvic	26	63	11	9	9	86
Kristen Veal	23	27	41	14	2	71
Brandy Reed	5	4	4	2	3	38
Oksana Zakaluzhnaya	5	3	0	0	0	6
Shea Mahoney	3	2	1	0	0	5
Quacy Barnes	2	1	0	1	2	3
