= Tawana McDonald =

American basketball player

Personal information
- Born: January 5, 1980 (age 46) Flint, Michigan, U.S.
- Listed height: 6 ft 3 in (1.91 m)
- Listed weight: 204 lb (93 kg)

Career information
- High school: Flint Northern (Flint, Michigan)
- College: Georgia (1998–2002)
- WNBA draft: 2002: 1st round, 13th overall pick
- Drafted by: Indiana Fever
- Position: Center
- Stats at Basketball Reference

Tawana Lenae McDonald (born January 5, 1980) is an American former basketball player who was selected in the first round of the 2002 WNBA draft.

== College career ==
McDonald compiled 297 career blocks, a Georgia-then record.

=== Georgia statistics ===
Legend
GP	Games played	GS	Games started	MPG	Minutes per game
FG%	Field goal percentage	3P%	3-point field goal percentage	FT%	Free throw percentage
RPG	Rebounds per game	APG	Assists per game	SPG	Steals per game
BPG	Blocks per game	PPG	Points per game	**Bold**	Career high

Year	Team	GP	Points	FG%	3P%	FT%	RPG	APG	SPG	BPG	PPG
1998-99	Georgia	27	245	49.2%	0.0%	54.1	6.9	0.9	**1.7**	2.1	9.1
1999-00	Georgia	**35**	**420**	**55.0%**	0.0%	64.7%	**8.8**	1.0	1.3	2.6	**12.0**
2000-01	Georgia	33	339	46.8%	0.0%	**76.5%**	7.0	1.2	1.5	**3.1**	10.3
2001-02	Georgia	29	221	54.9%	0.0%	68.8%	5.5	**1.2**	1.3	1.7	7.6
Career		124	1225	51.4%	0.0%	66.3%	7.1	1.1	1.4	2.4	9.9

== Awards, honors, and highlights ==
=== College ===
- All-SEC First Team (2000)
- All-SEC Second Team (2000, 2001)
- All-SEC Third Team (2001)
- Women's Basketball Journal Defensive All-America Second Team (2001)
- Led SEC in blocked shots in first three seasons and ranked fourth as a senior, finishing career with 2.4 bpg
- Set Georgia all-time record for blocked shots (297) and single-season record (103) in 2001
