= Kathy Wambe =

Belgian basketball player

Personal information
- Born: November 7, 1981 (age 45) Tournai, Belgium
- Listed height: 5 ft 9 in (1.75 m)

Career information
- WNBA draft: 2002: 2nd round, 20th overall pick
- Drafted by: Detroit Shock
- Position: Point guard
- Stats at Basketball Reference

Kathy Wambe (born November 7, 1981) is a former professional basketball player who plays for Belfius Namur in Belgium. She was the 21st pick in the 2002 WNBA draft, selected by Detroit Shock. In her career, she played for Belfius Namur (Belgium), Familia Schio (IItaly), Villeneuve (France), Taranto (Italy), Union Hainaut (France), and USVO (France).
