= Cori Enghusen =

American-born former basketball player

Personal information
- Born: April 8, 1980 (age 46) Bothell, Washington
- Listed height: 6 ft 7 in (2.01 m)
- Listed weight: 231 lb (105 kg)

Career information
- High school: Inglemoor (Kenmore, Washington)
- College: Stanford (1998–2002)
- WNBA draft: 2002: 4th round, 58th overall pick
- Drafted by: Houston Comets
- Position: Center

Career history
- 2004–2005: Migrosspor
- 2005–2006: Fenerbahçe
- 2006–2007: Botaşspor
- 2007–2008: Gospic
- 2008: BC Moscow
- 2008–2009: Galatasaray
- 2009–2011: Mersin Büyükşehir Belediyesi
- Stats at Basketball Reference
Medals
Women's basketball
Representing USA
World University Games
Gold medal – first place	2001 Beijing	Team competition

Cori Enghusen (born April 8, 1980), sometimes known as Korel Engin, is an American-born former female basketball player who represented Turkey. At 201 cm (6 ft 7 in), she was the tallest member of the Turkish women's basketball national team.

Born in Bothell, Washington, Enghusen started playing basketball at the age of 12. She played for Inglemoor High School in Washington until her graduation in 1998. She was named "1998 Gatorade Washington State Player of the Year". While she studied sociology in major and psychology at Stanford University between 1998 and 2002, she played as center of the college team, the sixth-ranked women's basketball team in the NCAA.

Cori Enghusen was member of the US national team at the 2001 Basketball World University Games in Beijing, China. She helped lead the U.S. to gold at the Games.

In 2003, she played professionally in Greece. Then she moved to Turkey and was with Migrosspor in Istanbul in 2004. In 2005, she agreed to become a Turkish citizen in order to join the Turkey women's basketball national team and to participate at the 2005 Mediterranean Games in Almería, Spain. She helped Turkey earn gold medal. Engin signed a two-years contract with Fenerbahçe Istanbul in July 2005.

== Stanford statistics ==
Legend
GP	Games played	GS	Games started	MPG	Minutes per game
FG%	Field goal percentage	3P%	3-point field goal percentage	FT%	Free throw percentage
RPG	Rebounds per game	APG	Assists per game	SPG	Steals per game
BPG	Blocks per game	PPG	Points per game	**Bold**	Career high

Year	Team	GP	Points	FG%	3P%	FT%	RPG	APG	SPG	BPG	PPG
1998-99	Stanford	25	42	**46.5%**	0.0%	33.3%	1.8	0.1	0.0	0.8	1.7
1999-00	Stanford	29	100	45.6%	0.0%	51.4%	2.1	0.1	0.1	0.7	3.4
2000-01	Stanford	33	132	46.0%	0.0%	**66.7%**	2.3	**0.3**	**0.3**	1.3	4.4
2001-02	Stanford	**35**	**184**	44.0%	0.0%	50.0%	**3.4**	0.3	0.2	**1.7**	**5.3**
Career		119	458	45.1%		53.2%	2.5	0.2	0.2	1.1	3.8

== Honors ==
- (Turkey) **Fenerbahçe Istanbul**
  - **Turkish League**
    - Winners (1): 2005–06
  - **Turkish Cup**
    - Winners (1): 2005–06
- (Turkey) **Galatasaray**
  - **Turkish Presidents Cup**
    - Winners (1): 2007–08
  - **EuroCup Women**
    - Winners (1): 2008-09

== See also ==
- Turkish women in sports
