= Elen Shakirova =

Russian basketball player (born 1970)

Personal information
- Born: June 2, 1970 (age 56)
- Listed height: 6 ft 3 in (1.91 m)

Career information
- WNBA draft: 2000: 1st round, 16th overall pick
- Drafted by: Houston Comets
- Position: Center
- Number: 32

Career history
- 2000–2002: Houston Comets

Career highlights
- WNBA champion (2000)
- Stats at Basketball Reference

Olympic medal record

Women's basketball

Representing the Unified Team
Gold medal – first place	1992 Barcelona	Team competition

Elen Shakirova (née Bunatyants, born 2 June 1970 in Mary, Turkmen SSR) is a Russian former basketball player who competed in the 1992 Summer Olympics, in the 1996 Summer Olympics, and in the 2000 Summer Olympics. She was born to an Armenian father and a Russian mother.
