= 2002 WNBA draft =

2002 meeting of WNBA teams to select players

General information
- Sport: Basketball
- Date: April 19, 2002

Overview
- League: WNBA
- First selection: Sue Bird; Seattle Storm

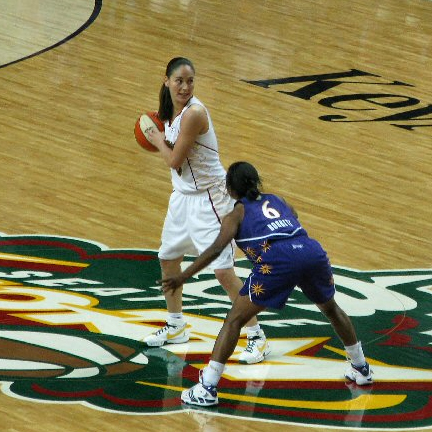
Sue Bird, with ball

The 2002 WNBA draft was the first to implement a lottery that arranges the order of the first four overall picks. The lottery gave four teams with the identically worst record of 10–22 from the 2001 season an equal chance to own the first overall selection, which the Seattle Storm did.

Four of the top six draft picks, Sue Bird (#1), Swin Cash (#2), Asjha Jones (#4) and Tamika (Williams) Raymond (#6) were from the same team, the 2002 NCAA champion University of Connecticut.

== Key ==
!	Denotes player who has been inducted to the Naismith Memorial Basketball Hall of Fame
^	Denotes player who has been inducted to the Women's Basketball Hall of Fame
*	Denotes player who has been selected for at least one All-Star Game and All-WNBA Team
^{+}	Denotes player who has been selected for at least one All-Star Game
^{#}	Denotes player who never played in the WNBA regular season or playoffs
**Bold**	Denotes player who won Rookie of the Year

== Draft ==
=== Round 1 ===
Pick	Player	Position	Nationality	Team	School / club team
1	Sue Bird * ^ !	G	United States	Seattle Storm	Connecticut
2	Swin Cash * ^ !	F	United States	Detroit Shock	Connecticut
3	Stacey Dales-Schuman ^{+}	G	Canada	Washington Mystics	Oklahoma
4	Asjha Jones *	F	United States	Washington Mystics (from Indiana)	Connecticut
5	Nikki Teasley *	G	United States	Portland Fire (traded to Los Angeles)	North Carolina
6	Tamika Williams	F	United States	Minnesota Lynx	Connecticut
7	Sheila Lambert	G	United States	Charlotte Sting (from Orlando)	Baylor
8	Deanna Jackson	F	United States	Cleveland Rockers (from Phoenix)	UAB
9	Shaunzinski Gortman	G	United States	Charlotte Sting (traded to Minnesota)	South Carolina
10	Michelle Snow ^{+}	C	United States	Houston Comets	Tennessee
11	Danielle Crockrom	F	United States	Utah Starzz	Baylor
12	Hamchétou Maïga	G/F	Mali	Sacramento Monarchs	Old Dominion
13	Tawana McDonald ^{#}	C	United States	Indiana Fever (from Miami via Phoenix)	Georgia
14	LaNeishea Caufield	G	United States	Utah Starzz (from New York)	Oklahoma
15	Tamara Moore	G/F	United States	Miami Sol (from Cleveland via Phoenix)	Wisconsin
16	Rosalind Ross ^{#}	G	United States	Los Angeles Sparks	Oklahoma

=== Round 2 ===
Pick	Player	Position	Nationality	Team	School / club team
17	Zuzi Klimešová	F	Czech Republic	Indiana Fever (from Washington)	Vanderbilt
18	Lenae Williams	G/F	United States	Detroit Shock	DePaul
19	Lucienne Berthieu	F/C	France	Seattle Storm	Old Dominion
20	Ayana Walker	F	United States	Detroit Shock (from Indiana)	Louisiana Tech
21	Jill Chapman	C	United States	Detroit Shock (from Portland)	Indiana
22	Kathy Wambe ^{#}	G	Belgium	Detroit Shock (from Minnesota)	Dexia Namur (Belgium)
23	Davalyn Cunningham	F	United States	Orlando Miracle	Rutgers
24	Brandi McCain	G	United States	Cleveland Rockers (from Phoenix)	Florida
25	Tootie Shaw ^{#}	F	United States	Phoenix Mercury (from Charlotte)	Wichita State
26	Linda Fröhlich	F	Germany	New York Liberty (from Houston)	UNLV
27	Andrea Gardner	F/C	United States	Utah Starzz	Howard
28	Felicia Ragland	G	United States	Seattle Storm (from Sacramento)	Oregon State
29	Lindsey Yamasaki	G/F	United States	Miami Sol	Stanford
30	Gergana Slavcheva	G	Bulgaria	Los Angeles Sparks (from New York, traded to Portland)	Florida International
31	Angie Welle ^{#}	C	United States	Cleveland Rockers	Iowa State
32	Jackie Higgins ^{#}	F/C	United States	Los Angeles Sparks	North Carolina

=== Round 3 ===
Pick	Player	Position	Nationality	Team	School / club team
33	LaNisha Cartwell ^{#}	C	United States	Washington Mystics	Alabama
34	Kelly Komara ^{#}	G	United States	Indiana Fever (from Detroit)	Purdue
35	Takeisha Lewis	F/C	United States	Seattle Storm	Louisiana Tech
36	Teresa Geter ^{#}	F/C	United States	Washington Mystics (from Indiana)	South Carolina
37	Mandy Nightingale ^{#}	G	United States	Portland Fire	Colorado
38	Lindsey Meder ^{#}	G	United States	Minnesota Lynx	Iowa
39	Saundra Jackson ^{#}	C	United States	Orlando Miracle	Ole Miss
40	Kayte Christensen	F	United States	Phoenix Mercury	UC Santa Barbara
41	Edniesha Curry	G	United States	Charlotte Sting	Oregon
42	Shondra Johnson ^{#}	G	United States	Houston Comets	Alabama
43	Edmarie Lumbsley ^{#}	C	United States	Utah Starzz	Mobile
44	Alayne Ingram ^{#}	G	United States	Sacramento Monarchs	Michigan
45	Jerica Watson ^{#}	F	United States	Miami Sol	Iowa
46	Tracy Gahan ^{#}	G	United States	New York Liberty	Iowa State
47	Ericka Haney ^{#}	G/F	United States	Detroit Shock (from Cleveland)	Notre Dame
48	Rashana Barnes ^{#}	F	United States	Los Angeles Sparks	Penn State

=== Round 4 ===
Pick	Player	Position	Nationality	Team	School / club team
49	LaKeisha Taylor ^{#}	C	United States	Indiana Fever (from Washington)	Arizona
50	Melody Johnson ^{#}	C	United States	Portland Fire (from Detroit)	Arizona State
51	Jermisha Dosty ^{#}	C	United States	Sacramento Monarchs (from Seattle)	Saint Mary's
52	Jillian Danker ^{#}	G/F	United States	Indiana Fever	Vanderbilt
53	Monique Cardenas ^{#}	G	United States	Portland Fire	Florida
54	Shárron Francis ^{#}	G	United States	Minnesota Lynx	Old Dominion
55	Tomeka Brown ^{#}	G	United States	Orlando Miracle	Ohio State
56	Amba Kongolo ^{#}	F/C	United States	Phoenix Mercury	North Carolina Central
57	Jessie Stomski ^{#}	F	United States	Charlotte Sting	Wisconsin
58	Cori Enghusen ^{#}	C	United States	Houston Comets	Stanford
59	Jacklyn Winfield ^{#}	G	United States	Utah Starzz	Southern
60	Elizabeth Pickney ^{#}	F	United States	Sacramento Monarchs	Arizona
61	Jerkisha Dosty ^{#}	F	United States	Miami Sol	Saint Mary's
62	Deedee Warley ^{#}	F	United States	New York Liberty	Maryland
63	Marché Strickland ^{#}	G	United States	Cleveland Rockers	Maryland
64	Tiffany Thompson ^{#}	F	United States	Los Angeles Sparks	Old Dominion

== UConn Fab Four ==
Connecticut Huskies players Tamika Williams, Sue Bird, Asjha Jones and Swin Cash were all selected in the first round of the draft. Each player had immediate impacts with their 2002 WNBA Teams. Cash, Bird and Williams accounted for 21.3, 19.9 and 17.3 percent, respectively, of their teams’ total points, rebounds and assists. Jones, a reserve, posted 8.8 percent of the Mystics' total output in those three key categories.

== See also ==
- List of first overall WNBA draft picks
