= 2002 Los Angeles Sparks season =

- WNBA champions
- Head coach: Michael Cooper
- Arena: Staples Center

Results
- Record: 25–7 (.781)
- Place: 1st (Western)
- Playoff finish: Won WNBA Finals

The 2002 WNBA season was the sixth season for the Los Angeles Sparks. The Sparks ended the season winning the WNBA Finals for the second straight year.

== Transactions ==
=== WNBA draft ===
Round	Pick	Player	Nationality	School/Team/Country
1	16	Rosalind Ross	United States	Oklahoma
2	30	Gergana Slavcheva	Bulgaria	FIU
2	32	Jackie Higgins	United States	North Carolina
3	48	Rashana Barnes	United States	Penn State
4	64	Tiffany Thompson	United States	Old Dominion

=== Transactions ===
Date	Transaction
April 19, 2002	Traded Ukari Figgs and Gergana Slavcheva to the Portland Fire in exchange for Nikki Teasley and Sophia Witherspoon
April 19, 2002	Drafted Rosalind Ross, Gergana Slavcheva, Jackie Higgins, Rashana Barnes and Tiffany Thompson in the 2002 WNBA draft
April 30, 2002	Signed Erika de Souza, Rhonda Smith and Kim Williams
May 3, 2002	Waived Rashana Barnes
May 8, 2002	Waived Tiffany Thompson
May 13, 2002	Waived Jackie Higgins, Kelley Simon, Kim Williams and Nicole Levandusky
May 13, 2002	Signed Vicki Hall, Shala Crawford and Naomi Mulitauaopele
May 16, 2002	Waived Rhonda Smith and Wendi Willits
May 23, 2002	Waived Naomi Mulitauaopele
June 7, 2002	Signed Katryna Gaither
June 11, 2002	Signed Sophia Witherspoon
June 18, 2002	Traded a 2003 1st Round Pick to the Miami Sol in exchange for Marlies Askamp
June 21, 2002	Waived Katryna Gaither

== Roster ==
2002 Los Angeles Sparks roster
Players
Coaches

Pos.	No.	Nat.	Name	Height	Weight	DOB	From	Yrs
C	41	(West Germany)	Askamp, Marlies	6' 5" (1.96m)	198 lb (90kg)	1970-07-08		5
G/F	0	(United States)	Byears, Latasha	5' 11" (1.8m)	206 lb (93kg)	1973-08-12	DePaul	5
F/C	14	(Brazil)	de Souza, Erika	6' 5" (1.96m)	190 lb (86kg)	1982-03-09		R
G	21	(United States)	Dixon, Tamecka	5' 9" (1.75m)	148 lb (67kg)	1975-12-14	Kansas	5
C	12	(United States)	Gaither, Katryna	6' 3" (1.91m)	170 lb (77kg)	1975-08-13	Notre Dame	1
G	17	(Socialist Federal Republic of Yugoslavia)	Grgin-Fonseca, Vedrana	6' 1" (1.85m)	160 lb (73kg)	1975-01-13		2
F	7	(United States)	Hall, Vicki	6' 1" (1.85m)	180 lb (82kg)	1969-10-03	Texas	2
C	9	(United States)	Leslie, Lisa	6' 5" (1.96m)	170 lb (77kg)	1972-07-07	USC	5
G	4	(Zaire)	Mabika, Mwadi	5' 11" (1.8m)	165 lb (75kg)	1976-07-27		5
G	10	(United States)	McCrimmon, Nicky	5' 8" (1.73m)	125 lb (57kg)	1972-03-22	USC	2
F	8	(United States)	Milton-Jones, DeLisha	6' 1" (1.85m)	175 lb (79kg)	1974-09-11	Florida	3
G	42	(United States)	Teasley, Nikki	6' 0" (1.83m)	169 lb (77kg)	1979-03-22	North Carolina	R
G	13	(United States)	Witherspoon, Sophia	5' 10" (1.78m)	145 lb (66kg)	1968-07-06	Florida	5

Head coach
(United States) Michael Cooper (New Mexico)
Assistant coaches
(United States) Glenn McDonald
(United States) Karleen Thompson

Legend

- (C) Team captain
- (DP) Unsigned draft pick
- (FA) Free agent
- (S) Suspended
- Injured

== Schedule ==
=== Regular season ===
2002 game log
Total: 25–7 (Home: 12–4; Road: 13–3)
May: 3–0 (Home: 1–0; Road: 2–0)

Game	Date	Team	Score	High points	High rebounds	High assists	Location Attendance	Record
1	May 25	New York	W 72–64	Leslie; Mabika; Witherspoon (14)	Lisa Leslie (14)	Tamecka Dixon (7)	Staples Center	1–0
2	May 27	@ Houston	W 68–55	Lisa Leslie (22)	Lisa Leslie (17)	Sophia Witherspoon (4)	Compaq Center	2–0
3	May 30	@ Miami	W 69–65	Mwadi Mabika (17)	DeLisha Milton-Jones (8)	Nikki Teasley (5)	American Airlines Arena	3–0

June : 9–2 (Home: 5–1; Road: 4–1)

Game	Date	Team	Score	High points	High rebounds	High assists	Location Attendance	Record
4	June 1	@ Charlotte	L 87–94 (OT)	Lisa Leslie (26)	Lisa Leslie (12)	Nikki Teasley (6)	Charlotte Coliseum	3–1
5	June 3	Portland	W 89–72	Lisa Leslie (25)	Lisa Leslie (18)	Nikki Teasley (7)	Staples Center	4–1
6	June 8	@ Minnesota	W 76–72	Mwadi Mabika (21)	Byears; Leslie; Mabika (7)	Lisa Leslie (5)	Target Center	5–1
7	June 11	Detroit	W 90–80	Leslie; Milton-Jones (18)	Lisa Leslie (9)	Nikki Teasley (8)	Staples Center	6–1
8	June 15	@ Sacramento	W 72–66 (OT)	Mwadi Mabika (19)	Lisa Leslie (11)	Tamecka Dixon (5)	ARCO Arena	7–1
9	June 18	@ Seattle	W 80–68	Mwadi Mabika (23)	Mabika; Milton-Jones (9)	Dixon; Mabika (4)	KeyArena	8–1
10	June 21	Minnesota	W 73–64	Lisa Leslie (23)	Lisa Leslie (9)	Nikki Teasley (5)	Staples Center	9–1
11	June 25	Phoenix	W 89–66	Mwadi Mabika (20)	Lisa Leslie (12)	Nikki Teasley (9)	Staples Center	10–1
12	June 27	Washington	W 73–66	Mwadi Mabika (20)	Lisa Leslie (14)	Nikki Teasley (7)	Staples Center	11–1
13	June 28	@ Phoenix	W 84–72	Lisa Leslie (18)	Leslie; Milton-Jones (14)	Nikki Teasley (6)	America West Arena	12–1
14	June 30	Houston	L 58–60	Mwadi Mabika (18)	Latasha Byears (11)	Tamecka Dixon (7)	Staples Center	12–2

July : 8–3 (Home: 5–1; Road: 3–2)

Game	Date	Team	Score	High points	High rebounds	High assists	Location Attendance	Record
15	July 5	Sacramento	W 87–65	Lisa Leslie (16)	Leslie; Milton-Jones (9)	Nikki Teasley (5)	Staples Center	13–2
16	July 7	Utah	W 102–75	Tamecka Dixon (20)	Lisa Leslie (8)	Tamecka Dixon (8)	Staples Center	14–2
17	July 11	@ Seattle	L 60–79	Lisa Leslie (21)	DeLisha Milton-Jones (10)	Mabika; Teasley (3)	KeyArena	14–3
18	July 12	@ Portland	W 82–76 (OT)	Mwadi Mabika (32)	DeLisha Milton-Jones (13)	Mwadi Mabika (6)	Rose Garden	15–3
19	July 17	@ Indiana	W 73–58	Mwadi Mabika (27)	Lisa Leslie (14)	Nikki Teasley (4)	Conseco Fieldhouse	16–3
20	July 18	@ New York	L 59–72	Lisa Leslie (16)	Lisa Leslie (11)	Tamecka Dixon (4)	Madison Square Garden	16–4
21	July 20	@ Cleveland	W 63–50	Mwadi Mabika (15)	DeLisha Milton-Jones (10)	Nikki Teasley (8)	Gund Arena	17–4
22	July 22	Orlando	W 92–84	Lisa Leslie (24)	Lisa Leslie (21)	Lisa Leslie (8)	Staples Center	18–4
23	July 24	Portland	W 73–69	Lisa Leslie (21)	DeLisha Milton-Jones (13)	Dixon; Mabika; McCrimmon; Milton-Jones (3)	Staples Center	19–4
24	July 28	Indiana	W 80–62	Mwadi Mabika (22)	Lisa Leslie (9)	Nikki Teasley (7)	Staples Center	20–4
25	July 30	Miami	L 73–82	Mwadi Mabika (17)	Lisa Leslie (8)	Nicky McCrimmon (6)	Staples Center	20–5

August : 5–2 (Home: 1–2; Road: 4–0)

Game	Date	Team	Score	High points	High rebounds	High assists	Location Attendance	Record
26	August 1	Seattle	L 76–81	Lisa Leslie (30)	Lisa Leslie (16)	Nikki Teasley (7)	Staples Center	20–6
27	August 3	@ Sacramento	W 81–71	Mwadi Mabika (20)	Lisa Leslie (9)	Mwadi Mabika (9)	ARCO Arena	21–6
28	August 4	Utah	W 90–86	Lisa Leslie (26)	Mwadi Mabika (7)	Mwadi Mabika (6)	Staples Center	22–6
29	August 8	Houston	L 64–67	Mwadi Mabika (27)	Leslie; Milton-Jones (12)	Tamecka Dixon (5)	Staples Center	22–7
30	August 9	@ Utah	W 85–77	Lisa Leslie (19)	Mwadi Mabika (9)	Nikki Teasley (6)	Delta Center	23–7
31	August 11	@ Minnesota	W 69–58	Mwadi Mabika (16)	Nikki Teasley (6)	Tamecka Dixon (7)	Target Center	24–7
32	August 13	@ Phoenix	W 63–56	Lisa Leslie (23)	Lisa Leslie (11)	Mabika; Milton-Jones (3)	America West Arena	25–7

2002 season schedule

=== Playoffs ===
2002 playoff game log
First round vs. Seattle Storm
Won Series: 2–0

Game	Date	Team	Score	High points	High rebounds	High assists	Location Attendance	Series
1	August 15	@ Seattle	W 78–61	Lisa Leslie (24)	Lisa Leslie (9)	Nikki Teasley (8)	KeyArena	1–0
2	August 17	Seattle	W 69–59	Lisa Leslie (23)	DeLisha Milton-Jones (10)	Mabika; Teasley (4)	Staples Center	2–0

Conference Finals vs. Utah Starzz
Won Series: 2–0

Game	Date	Team	Score	High points	High rebounds	High assists	Location Attendance	Series
1	August 22	@ Utah	W 75–67	DeLisha Milton-Jones (17)	Lisa Leslie (8)	DeLisha Milton-Jones (5)	Delta Center	1–0
2	August 24	Utah	W 103–77	Lisa Leslie (25)	Mwadi Mabika (9)	Nikki Teasley (9)	Staples Center	2–0

WNBA Finals vs. New York Liberty
Won Series: 2–0

Game	Date	Team	Score	High points	High rebounds	High assists	Location Attendance	Series
1	August 29	@ New York	W 71–63	Mwadi Mabika (20)	Latasha Byears (11)	Nikki Teasley (11)	Madison Square Garden	1–0
2	August 31	New York	W 69–66	Lisa Leslie (17)	Latasha Byears (11)	Nikki Teasley (11)	Staples Center	2–0

2002 playoff schedule

=== Season standings ===
Western Conference	W	L	PCT	Conf.	GB
Los Angeles Sparks ^{x}	25	7	.781	17–4	–
Houston Comets ^{x}	24	8	.750	16–5	1.0
Utah Starzz ^{x}	20	12	.625	12–9	5.0
Seattle Storm ^{x}	17	15	.531	10–11	8.0
Portland Fire ^{o}	16	16	.500	8–13	9.0
Sacramento Monarchs ^{o}	14	18	.438	8–13	11.0
Phoenix Mercury ^{o}	11	21	.344	7–14	14.0
Minnesota Lynx ^{o}	10	22	.313	6–15	15.0

== Statistics ==
Legend
GP	Games played	GS	Games started	MPG	Minutes per game	RPG	Rebounds per game
APG	Assists per game	SPG	Steals per game	BPG	Blocks per game	PPG	Points per game
FG%	Field-goal percentage	3P%	3-point field-goal percentage	FT%	Free-throw percentage	TO	Turnovers per game
PF	Fouls per game		Team leader		League leader

=== Regular season ===
Player	GP	GS	MPG	FG%	3P%	FT%	RPG	APG	SPG	BPG	PPG
Lisa Leslie	31	31	34.2	.466	.324	.727	10.4	2.7	1.5	2.9	16.9
Mwadi Mabika	32	32	32.8	.423	.366	.839	5.2	2.9	1.2	0.3	16.8
Tamecka Dixon	30	30	31.9	.391	.351	.831	3.1	4.0	0.9	0.2	10.6
DeLisha Milton-Jones	32	25	30.2	.487	.420	.740	6.6	1.4	1.6	1.1	11.3
Nikki Teasley	32	32	27.6	.404	.400	.750	2.6	4.4	0.8	0.3	6.4
Latasha Byears	26	5	18.7	.618	N/A	.566	5.4	0.5	0.7	0.2	7.0
Sophia Witherspoon	31	1	11.5	.415	.418	.761	0.9	0.9	0.4	0.1	5.2
Nicky McCrimmon	32	0	11.1	.408	.267	.636	0.7	1.7	0.7	0.1	1.6
Marlies Askamp	20	4	10.8	.473	.000	.643	2.5	0.2	0.6	0.2	3.1
Vedrana Grgin-Fonseca	12	0	6.6	.387	.417	.667	0.7	0.1	0.1	0.0	2.6
Vicki Hall	3	0	6.3	.500	.000	.750	0.7	0.3	0.3	0.0	2.3
Katryna Gaither	1	0	5.0	.000	N/A	N/A	1.0	1.0	0.0	0.0	0.0
Erika de Souza	11	0	3.7	.357	N/A	.200	1.3	0.2	0.3	0.0	1.1

^{‡}Waived/Released during the season
^{†}Traded during the season
^{≠}Acquired during the season

== Awards and honors ==
- Lisa Leslie, Best WNBA Player ESPY Award
