= 2003 WNBA Finals =

Sports tournament

Team	Coach	Wins
Detroit Shock	Bill Laimbeer	2
Los Angeles Sparks	Michael Cooper	1
- Dates: September 12–16
- MVP: Ruth Riley (Detroit Shock)
- Hall of Famers: Shock: Swin Cash (2022); Sparks: Lisa Leslie (2015); Coaches: Michael Cooper (2024, player)
- Eastern finals: Detroit defeated Connecticut, 2–0
- Western finals: Los Angeles defeated Sacramento, 2–1

The 2003 WNBA Finals was the championship series of the 2003 WNBA season, and the conclusion of the season's playoffs. The Detroit Shock, top-seeded champions of the Eastern Conference, defeated the Los Angeles Sparks, top-seeded champions of the Western Conference, two games to one in a best-of-three series. This was Detroit's first title.

The Shock made their first appearance in the Finals in franchise history. The Sparks made their third straight Finals appearance.

Going into the series, the Sparks had won two WNBA championships (2001, 2002).

The Shock had a 25–9 record (.735), good enough to receive home-court advantage over the Sparks (24–10).

== Road to the finals ==
Los Angeles Sparks		Detroit Shock
24–10 (.706); 1st West, 2nd overall	Regular season	25–9 (.735); 1st East, 1st overall
Defeated the (4) Minnesota Lynx, 2–1	Conference Semifinals	Defeated the (4) Cleveland Rockers, 2–1
Defeated the (3) Sacramento Monarchs, 2–1	Conference Finals	Defeated the (3) Connecticut Sun, 2–0

=== Regular season series ===
The Shock won the regular season series:

June 17

Recap

Los Angeles Sparks 78, Detroit Shock 87 (OT)

Palace of Auburn Hills, Auburn Hills

== Game summaries ==
All times listed below are Eastern Daylight Time.

=== Game 1 ===
ESPN2

September 12
9:00pm

Recap

Detroit Shock 63, Los Angeles Sparks 75
Scoring by half: 21–42, 42–33
Pts: Cash 16; Rebs: Ford 12; Asts: Cash 4	Pts: Leslie 23; Rebs: Leslie 12; Asts: Teasley 11
L.A Sparks leads series, 1–0

Staples Center, Los Angeles
Attendance: 10,624
Referees:
- Courteau
- Mattingly
- Trammell

Lisa Leslie collected 23 points and 12 rebounds as the two-time defending champion Sparks used a huge first half for a 75–63 victory over the Detroit Shock in Game One of the WNBA Finals.

Detroit entered with the Coach of the Year in Bill Laimbeer, who has put his stamp on a physical frontcourt that features Swin Cash, rookie Cheryl Ford and Ruth Riley. But Leslie and Delisha Milton led a defensive effort that bottled up the Shock's vaunted trio and opened up a 42–21 cushion at halftime.

Leslie scored 12 points in a 25–4 tear that broke open the game for the Sparks. Her basket with just under three minutes remaining before halftime gave Los Angeles a 38–16 cushion.

The Shock shot a woeful 19 percent (7-of-37) in the first half. Ford made just one of her first seven attempts and had her shot blocked emphatically by Milton on one occasion and Leslie on another.

Milton scored 19 points and grabbed nine rebounds while Tamecka Dixon added 15 points. Point guard Nikki Teasley handed out 11 assists.

Leslie had little trouble against the 6-5 Riley, scoring 14 points on 7-of-11 shooting in the first half. The success did not come as a surprise to her.

Cash scored 16 points and Deanna Nolan, who was listed as questionable due to a back injury, added 15 for Detroit. Cash, Riley and Ford, who collected 11 points and 12 rebounds, combined to make just 10-of-39 shots.

Riley managed only six points and six rebounds in 32 foul-plagued minutes. Detroit finished at just under 29 percent (20-of-70).

=== Game 2 ===
ESPN2

September 14
7:00 pm

Recap

Los Angeles Sparks 61, Detroit Shock 62
Scoring by half: 22–38, 29–24
Pts: Milton, Leslie 18; Rebs: Leslie 15; Asts: Teasley 6	Pts: Holland-Corn 16; Rebs: Powell 8 Asts: Riley 5
Series tied, 1–1

Palace of Auburn Hills, Auburn Hills
Attendance: 17,846
Referees:
- Bell
- Boland
- Gulbeyan

Deanna Nolan and the Detroit Shock found a way to stave off elimination.

Nolan made two foul shots with 12 seconds left and the Shock made a final defensive stand to hold off the two-time defending champion Los Angeles Sparks for a 62–61 victory in Game 2 of the WNBA Finals.

Detroit blew a 19-point lead and seemed on the verge of being swept out of the WNBA Finals. Lisa Leslie's basket capped an 11–0 spurt that provided a 61–57 advantage for Los Angeles with 1:28 remaining.

Detroit's Kedra Holland-Corn answered with a 3-pointer, and Los Angeles' Tamecka Dixon misfired on the other end. After a timeout, Nolan drew a foul on Sparks forward Delisha Milton and made her foul shots to give the Shock the lead.

After a timeout by Sparks coach Michael Cooper, Los Angeles went to Leslie. The 6–5 center was swarmed by the Shock defense and kicked it out to Milton, who tried to get off a shot but lost the ball instead as time expired.

Holland-Corn came off the bench for 10 of her 16 points in the second half. Nolan scored 14 points and Ruth Riley added 11 as the Shock overcame 32 percent shooting (9-of-28) over the final 20 minutes.

Leslie scored 16 of her 18 points in the second half and also grabbed 15 rebounds for Los Angeles. Milton netted 18 points despite 6-of-18 shooting.

The Shock dominated play from the outset, using a 22–5 tear for a 24–9 cushion on a three-pointer by Holland-Corn near the midway point of the first half. A foul shot by Riley with 2:49 left before halftime opened up a 38–19 advantage.

=== Game 3 ===
ESPN2

September 16
7:00 pm

Recap

Los Angeles Sparks 78, Detroit Shock 83
Scoring by half: 37–42, 41–41
Pts: Mabika 29; Rebs: Leslie 11; Asts: Teasley 7	Pts: Riley 27; Rebs: Cash 12; Asts: Cash 9
Detroit wins WNBA Finals, 2-1

Palace of Auburn Hills, Auburn Hills
Attendance: 22,076
Referees:
- Corteau
- Price
- Mattingly

The Detroit Shock won the WNBA Finals, defeating the two-time defending champion Los Angeles Sparks, 83–78, as Ruth Riley dominated the decisive third game.

Riley scored a career-high 27 points on 11-for-19 shooting and won the showdown of All-Star centers as she thoroughly outplayed Lisa Leslie, who managed 13 points on 5-for-19 shooting before fouling out in the final minute.

The 6-5 Riley was named Most Valuable Player. It was somewhat of a reprise of 2001, when she led Notre Dame to the national championship with the same sort of post play she displayed in this series.

After the final buzzer, confetti fell from the rafters of The Palace of Auburn Hills and Riley triumphantly hoisted a sign that read, "2003 WNBA champions" as the crowd of 22,076—the largest in league history—celebrated.

The Shock became the first team in American pro sports to go from having the worst record in the league to champions the following season.

The Sparks did not go down without a fight. They erased a 14-point deficit in the first half and an 11-point deficit in the second half, opening a three-point lead with 3:40 left.

Leslie made 1-for-2 free throws to provide a 73–70 lead, but the Sparks went scoreless for more than three minutes. Riley made a short jumper, then harassed Leslie into a miss at the other end with 1:10 left.

After Deanna Nolan's three-pointer gave Detroit the lead for good, Leslie missed a short banker and fouled out chasing the rebound.

Nolan scored 17 points, Swin Cash added 13, 12 rebounds and nine assists and Ford had 10 and 12 boards for the Shock, who won the last two games at home after dropping the opener in L.A.

Mwadi Mabika had 29 points and nine rebounds, Delisha Milton scored 19 points and Tamecka Dixon added 14 for the Sparks, who were 0–4 on the road in the postseason.

== Awards ==
- 2003 WNBA champion: Detroit Shock
- Finals MVP: Ruth Riley

== Rosters ==
2003 Detroit Shock Finals roster
Players
Coaches

Pos.	No.	Nat.	Name	Height	Weight	From
F	32	(United States)	Cash, Swin	6' 2" (1.88m)	162 lb (73kg)	Connecticut
F/C	54	(United States)	Farris, Barbara	6' 3" (1.91m)	195 lb (88kg)	Tulane
F	35	(United States)	Ford, Cheryl	6' 3" (1.91m)	215 lb (98kg)	Louisiana Tech
G	11	(United States)	Holland-Corn, Kedra	5' 8" (1.73m)	136 lb (62kg)	Georgia
G	31	(United States)	Lambert, Sheila	5' 7" (1.7m)	125 lb (57kg)	Baylor
F	44	(Senegal)	Ndiaye-Diatta, Astou	6' 3" (1.91m)	182 lb (83kg)	Southern Nazarene
G	14	(United States)	Nolan, Deanna	6' 0" (1.83m)	160 lb (73kg)	Georgia
G	5	(United States)	Powell, Elaine	5' 9" (1.75m)	147 lb (67kg)	LSU
C	00	(United States)	Riley, Ruth	6' 5" (1.96m)	195 lb (88kg)	Notre Dame
F	9	(United States)	Thomas, Stacey	5' 10" (1.78m)	154 lb (70kg)	Michigan
F	12	(United States)	Walker, Ayana	6' 3" (1.91m)	143 lb (65kg)	Louisiana Tech

Head coach
(United States) Bill Laimbeer (Notre Dame)
Assistant coaches
(United States) Laurie Byrd
(United States) Pamela McGee
(United States) Korie Hlede
Athletic trainer
(United States) Laura Ramus

Legend

- (C) Team captain
- (DP) Unsigned draft pick
- (FA) Free agent
- (S) Suspended
- Injured

2003 Los Angeles Sparks Finals roster
Players
Coaches

Pos.	No.	Nat.	Name	Height	Weight	From
G	21	(United States)	Dixon, Tamecka	5' 9" (1.75m)	148 lb (67kg)	Kansas
F/C	22	(United States)	Gillom, Jennifer	6' 3" (1.91m)	180 lb (82kg)	Mississippi
C	9	(United States)	Leslie, Lisa	6' 5" (1.96m)	170 lb (77kg)	USC
F	4	(Democratic Republic of the Congo)	Mabika, Mwadi	5' 11" (1.8m)	165 lb (75kg)	Democratic Republic of the Congo
G	10	(United States)	McCrimmon, Nicky	5' 8" (1.73m)	125 lb (57kg)	USC
F	8	(United States)	Milton, Delisha	6' 0" (1.83m)	172 lb (78kg)	Florida
F	31	(United States)	Nygaard, Vanessa	6' 1" (1.85m)	175 lb (79kg)	Stanford
F	34	(United States)	Pride, Lynn	6' 2" (1.88m)	180 lb (82kg)	Kansas
G	42	(United States)	Teasley, Nikki	6' 0" (1.83m)	169 lb (77kg)	North Carolina
G	20	(United States)	Williams, Shaquala	5' 6" (1.68m)	135 lb (61kg)	Oregon
G	13	(United States)	Witherspoon, Sophia	5' 10" (1.78m)	145 lb (66kg)	Florida

Head coach
(United States) Michael Cooper (New Mexico)
Assistant coaches
(United States) Karleen Thompson (USC)
(United States) Ryan Weisenberg
Athletic trainer
(United States) Sandee Teruya

Legend

- (C) Team captain
- (DP) Unsigned draft pick
- (FA) Free agent
- (S) Suspended
- Injured
