= 2000 Los Angeles Sparks season =

- Head coach: Michael Cooper
- Arena: Great Western Forum

Results
- Record: 28–4 (.875)
- Place: 1st (Western)
- Playoff finish: Lost Conference Finals (2-0) to Houston Comets

The 2000 WNBA season was the fourth season for the Los Angeles Sparks. The team set a 28–4 record, the best in league history, but they were unable to go for the WNBA Finals, losing in the conference finals in a sweep to the Houston Comets.

== Transactions ==
=== Indiana Fever expansion draft ===
The following player was selected in the Indiana Fever expansion draft from the Los Angeles Sparks:

Player	Nationality	School/Team/Country
Gordana Grubin	Yugoslavia	MiZo Pécs (Hungary)

=== Seattle Storm expansion draft ===
The following player was selected in the Seattle Storm expansion draft from the Los Angeles Sparks:

Player	Nationality	School/Team/Country
Nina Bjedov	Yugoslavia	Basket Bees Treviglio (Italy)

=== WNBA draft ===
Round	Pick	Player	Nationality	School/Team/Country
1	15	Nicole Kubik	United States	Nebraska
2	31	Paige Sauer	United States	UConn
3	47	Marte Alexander	United States	Arizona
4	63	Nicky McCrimmon	United States	USC

=== Transactions ===
Date	Transaction
September 30, 1999	Head Coach Orlando Woolridge retires from coaching
October 14, 1999	Hired Michael Cooper as Head Coach
December 15, 1999	Lost Nina Bjedov to the Seattle Storm in the WNBA expansion draft
December 15, 1999	Lost Gordana Grubin to the Indiana Fever in the WNBA expansion draft
April 25, 2000	Drafted Nicole Kubik, Paige Sauer, Marte Alexander and Nicky McCrimmon in the 2000 WNBA draft
May 30, 2000	Waived Nicole Kubik
October 11, 2000	Traded La'Keshia Frett to the Sacramento Monarchs in exchange for Latasha Byears
October 11, 2000	Traded Allison Feaster and Clarisse Machanguana to the Charlotte Sting in exchange for Rhonda Mapp and E.C. Hill

== Roster ==
2000 Los Angeles Sparks roster
Players
Coaches

Pos.	No.	Nat.	Name	Height	Weight	DOB	From	Yrs
G	21	(United States)	Dixon, Tamecka	5' 9" (1.75m)	148 lb (67kg)	1975-12-14	Kansas	3
F	5	(United States)	Feaster, Allison	5' 11" (1.8m)	168 lb (76kg)	1976-02-11	Harvard	2
G	15	(United States)	Figgs, Ukari	5' 9" (1.75m)	142 lb (64kg)	1977-03-31	Purdue	1
F	0	(United States)	Frett, La'Keshia	6' 3" (1.91m)	170 lb (77kg)	1975-06-12	Georgia	1
G	17	(Socialist Federal Republic of Yugoslavia)	Grgin-Fonseca, Vedrana	6' 1" (1.85m)	160 lb (73kg)	1975-01-13		R
C	9	(United States)	Leslie, Lisa	6' 5" (1.96m)	170 lb (77kg)	1972-07-07	USC	3
G	4	(Zaire)	Mabika, Mwadi	5' 11" (1.8m)	165 lb (75kg)	1976-07-27		3
F/C	33	(People's Republic of Mozambique)	Machanguana, Clarisse	6' 5" (1.96m)	180 lb (82kg)	1976-10-04	Old Dominion	1
G	10	(United States)	McCrimmon, Nicky	5' 8" (1.73m)	125 lb (57kg)	1972-03-22	USC	R
F	8	(United States)	Milton-Jones, DeLisha	6' 1" (1.85m)	175 lb (79kg)	1974-09-11	Florida	1
C	31	(United States)	Sauer, Paige	6' 5" (1.96m)	200 lb (91kg)	1977-12-08	Connecticut	R

Head coach
(United States) Michael Cooper (New Mexico)
Assistant coaches
(United States) Marianne Stanley

Legend

- (C) Team captain
- (DP) Unsigned draft pick
- (FA) Free agent
- (S) Suspended
- Injured

== Schedule ==
=== Regular season ===
2000 game log
Total: 28–4 (Home: 15–1; Road: 13–3)
May: 1–0 (Home: 1–0; Road: 0–0)

Game	Date	Team	Score	High points	High rebounds	High assists	Location Attendance	Record
1	May 31	Utah	W 69-62	Mwadi Mabika (21)	Lisa Leslie (11)	Leslie; Mabika (4)	Great Western Forum	1–0

June: 10–2 (Home: 4–0; Road: 6–2)

Game	Date	Team	Score	High points	High rebounds	High assists	Location Attendance	Record
2	June 3	@ Minnesota	W 82-75	Lisa Leslie (21)	Lisa Leslie (11)	DeLisha Milton-Jones (5)	Target Center	2–0
3	June 6	Portland	W 70-57	Lisa Leslie (19)	Allison Feaster (7)	Dixon; Figgs; Mabika (3)	Great Western Forum	3–0
4	June 10	Phoenix	W 76-57	DeLisha Milton-Jones (17)	Lisa Leslie (10)	Dixon; Mabika (5)	Great Western Forum	4–0
5	June 11	@ Sacramento	L 68-75	Lisa Leslie (19)	Lisa Leslie (11)	Mwadi Mabika (6)	ARCO Arena	4–1
6	June 13	@ Seattle	L 59-69 (OT)	DeLisha Milton-Jones (13)	DeLisha Milton-Jones (9)	Ukari Figgs (4)	KeyArena	4–2
7	June 17	@ Portland	W 94-81	Mwadi Mabika (26)	Mwadi Mabika (10)	Dixon; Figgs (4)	Rose Garden	5–2
8	June 18	Charlotte	W 70-62	Mwadi Mabika (21)	Allison Feaster (6)	Ukari Figgs (5)	Great Western Forum	6–2
9	June 20	Houston	W 90-84	Leslie; Mabika (21)	Lisa Leslie (14)	Ukari Figgs (8)	Great Western Forum	7–2
10	June 23	@ Miami	W 68-54	Lisa Leslie (17)	Lisa Leslie (13)	Tamecka Dixon (4)	American Airlines Arena	8–2
11	June 25	@ New York	W 72-67	Lisa Leslie (22)	DeLisha Milton-Jones (11)	Mwadi Mabika (6)	Madison Square Garden	9–2
12	June 26	@ Washington	W 74-72	Tamecka Dixon (13)	Lisa Leslie (14)	Figgs; Mabika; McCrimmon (4)	MCI Center	10–2
13	June 28	@ Indiana	W 82-73	Mwadi Mabika (19)	Lisa Leslie (13)	Ukari Figgs (9)	Conseco Fieldhouse	11–2

July: 14–1 (Home: 10–1; Road: 4–0)

Game	Date	Team	Score	High points	High rebounds	High assists	Location Attendance	Record
14	July 1	Cleveland	W 75-67	Lisa Leslie (22)	DeLisha Milton-Jones (12)	Mwadi Mabika (6)	Great Western Forum	12–2
15	July 2	Detroit	W 85-63	Mwadi Mabika (21)	Lisa Leslie (12)	Tamecka Dixon (8)	Great Western Forum	13–2
16	July 5	@ Sacramento	W 76-61	Mwadi Mabika (23)	Lisa Leslie (9)	Figgs; Mabika (5)	ARCO Arena	14–2
17	July 6	Washington	W 79-70	Lisa Leslie (21)	Lisa Leslie (13)	Nicky McCrimmon (6)	Great Western Forum	15–2
18	July 9	Utah	W 92-72	Lisa Leslie (22)	Leslie; Machanguana (5)	Ukari Figgs (7)	Great Western Forum	16–2
19	July 11	Portland	L 77-80	Mwadi Mabika (22)	Lisa Leslie (7)	Figgs; Milton-Jones (4)	Great Western Forum	16–3
20	July 14	Houston	W 63-58	Mwadi Mabika (15)	Leslie; Mabika (8)	Ukari Figgs (5)	Great Western Forum	17–3
21	July 15	Minnesota	W 58-57	Lisa Leslie (24)	Lisa Leslie (13)	Dixon; Figgs (3)	Great Western Forum	18–3
22	July 20	New York	W 82-66	Lisa Leslie (21)	Lisa Leslie (14)	Ukari Figgs (9)	Great Western Forum	19–3
23	July 21	@ Phoenix	W 74-68	Lisa Leslie (30)	Lisa Leslie (16)	Figgs; McCrimmon (5)	America West Arena	20–3
24	July 23	Sacramento	W 73-68	Lisa Leslie (20)	DeLisha Milton-Jones (11)	Tamecka Dixon (7)	Great Western Forum	21–3
25	July 25	Orlando	W 78-63	Lisa Leslie (17)	Lisa Leslie (11)	Ukari Figgs (6)	Charlotte Coliseum	22–3
26	July 27	Seattle	W 76-63	Lisa Leslie (18)	Lisa Leslie (7)	Ukari Figgs (5)	Great Western Forum	23–3
27	July 29	@ Houston	W 84-74	Tamecka Dixon (19)	Lisa Leslie (10)	Mwadi Mabika (6)	Compaq Center	24–3
28	July 31	@ Minnesota	W 73-66	DeLisha Milton-Jones (18)	DeLisha Milton-Jones (14)	DeLisha Milton-Jones (6)	Target Center	25–3

August: 3–1 (Home: 0–0; Road: 3–1)

Game	Date	Team	Score	High points	High rebounds	High assists	Location Attendance	Record
29	August 2	@ Detroit	W 84-81	Lisa Leslie (27)	DeLisha Milton-Jones (6)	Dixon; Leslie; Milton-Jones (3)	The Palace of Auburn Hills	26–3
30	August 5	@ Phoenix	W 77-63	Lisa Leslie (22)	Lisa Leslie (14)	Tamecka Dixon (7)	America West Arena	27–3
31	August 8	@ Seattle	W 60-52 (OT)	Tamecka Dixon (17)	Mwadi Mabika (12)	Mwadi Mabika (3)	KeyArena	28–3
32	August 9	@ Utah	L 77-89	Lisa Leslie (18)	Lisa Leslie (10)	Dixon; Leslie; McCrimmon (3)	Delta Center	28–4

=== Playoffs ===
2000 playoff game log
First round vs. Phoenix Mercury
Won Series: 2–0

Game	Date	Team	Score	High points	High rebounds	High assists	Location Attendance	Series
1	August 11	@ Phoenix	W 86–71	Lisa Leslie (20)	Lisa Leslie (11)	Tamecka Dixon (5)	America West Arena	1–0
2	August 13	Phoenix	W 101–76	Lisa Leslie (29)	Leslie; Mabika (8)	Tamecka Dixon (7)	Great Western Forum	2–0

Conference Finals vs. Houston Comets
Lost Series: 0–2

Game	Date	Team	Score	High points	High rebounds	High assists	Location Attendance	Series
1	August 17	@ Houston	L 56–77	Mwadi Mabika (21)	Lisa Leslie (8)	Figgs; Milton-Jones (4)	Compaq Center	0–1
2	August 20	Houston	L 69–74	Mwadi Mabika (19)	Lisa Leslie (14)	Leslie; Figgs (5)	Great Western Forum	0–2

2000 playoff schedule

=== Season standings ===
Western Conference	W	L	PCT	Conf.	GB
Los Angeles Sparks ^{x}	28	4	.875	17–4	–
Houston Comets ^{x}	27	5	.844	17–4	1.0
Sacramento Monarchs ^{x}	21	11	.656	13–8	7.0
Phoenix Mercury ^{x}	20	12	.625	11–10	8.0
Utah Starzz ^{o}	18	14	.563	13–8	10.0
Minnesota Lynx ^{o}	15	17	.469	5–16	13.0
Portland Fire ^{o}	10	22	.313	4–17	18.0
Seattle Storm ^{o}	6	26	.188	4–17	22.0

== Statistics ==
Legend
GP	Games played	GS	Games started	MPG	Minutes per game	RPG	Rebounds per game
APG	Assists per game	SPG	Steals per game	BPG	Blocks per game	PPG	Points per game
FG%	Field-goal percentage	3P%	3-point field-goal percentage	FT%	Free-throw percentage	TO	Turnovers per game
PF	Fouls per game		Team leader		League leader

=== Regular season ===
Player	GP	GS	MPG	FG%	3P%	FT%	RPG	APG	SPG	BPG	PPG
Lisa Leslie	32	32	32.1	.458	.219	.824	9.6	1.9	1.0	2.3	17.8
DeLisha Milton-Jones	32	32	30.7	.512	.250	.745	6.1	2.1	1.4	0.9	11.8
Mwadi Mabika	32	32	29.4	.388	.384	.820	5.6	3.1	1.8	0.6	12.3
Tamecka Dixon	31	31	28.5	.454	.353	.805	3.4	3.1	1.3	0.3	10.9
Ukari Figgs	32	32	25.1	.431	.354	.831	1.7	4.0	0.7	0.1	6.7
Nicky McCrimmon	32	0	15.3	.506	.485	.500	1.0	2.0	0.9	0.3	3.2
Allison Feaster	32	0	14.7	.359	.259	.833	2.7	1.0	0.7	0.1	6.3
Clarisse Machanguana	31	1	13.6	.578	.000	.560	2.3	0.6	0.4	0.1	3.5
Vedrana Grgin-Fonseca	18	0	10.2	.274	.059	.609	1.3	0.7	0.2	0.1	2.7
La'Keshia Frett	25	0	7.5	.275	.000	.750	1.0	0.2	0.3	0.2	1.6
Paige Sauer	12	0	5.5	.571	N/A	.800	1.3	0.3	0.2	0.1	1.7

^{‡}Waived/Released during the season
^{†}Traded during the season
^{≠}Acquired during the season
