= 2001 Los Angeles Sparks season =

Women's basketball season

- WNBA champions
- Head coach: Michael Cooper
- Arena: Staples Center

Results
- Record: 28–4 (.875)
- Place: 1st (Western)
- Playoff finish: Won WNBA Finals

Media
- Television: KCOP (UPN 13); Fox Sports Net West

The 2001 WNBA season was the fifth season for the Los Angeles Sparks. The Sparks won their first WNBA Finals.

== Transactions ==
=== WNBA draft ===
Round	Pick	Player	Nationality	School/Team/Country
1	16	Camille Cooper	United States	Purdue
2	32	Nicole Levandusky	United States	Xavier
3	48	Kelley Siemon	United States	Notre Dame
4	64	Beth Record	United States	Syracuse

=== Transactions ===
Date	Transaction
April 20, 2001	Drafted Camille Cooper, Nicole Levandusky, Kelley Siemon and Beth Record in the 2001 WNBA draft
April 30, 2001	Signed Kiesha Brown and Wendi Willits
May 9, 2001	Waived Beth Record
May 18, 2001	Waived E.C. Hill, Kiesha Brown and Paige Sauer
May 27, 2001	Suspended contract of Kelley Siemon
June 5, 2001	Traded Camille Cooper to the New York Liberty in exchange for a 2002 2nd Round Pick

== Roster ==
2001 Los Angeles Sparks roster
Players
Coaches

Pos.	No.	Nat.	Name	Height	Weight	DOB	From	Yrs
G/F	0	(United States)	Byears, Latasha	5' 11" (1.8m)	206 lb (93kg)	1973-08-12	DePaul	4
G	21	(United States)	Dixon, Tamecka	5' 9" (1.75m)	148 lb (67kg)	1975-12-14	Kansas	4
G	5	(United States)	Figgs, Ukari	5' 9" (1.75m)	142 lb (64kg)	1977-03-31	Purdue	2
G	17	(Socialist Federal Republic of Yugoslavia)	Grgin-Fonseca, Vedrana	6' 1" (1.85m)	160 lb (73kg)	1975-01-13		1
C	9	(United States)	Leslie, Lisa	6' 5" (1.96m)	170 lb (77kg)	1972-07-07	USC	4
G	40	(United States)	Levandusky, Nicole	5' 8" (1.73m)		1979-05-17	Xavier	R
G	4	(Zaire)	Mabika, Mwadi	5' 11" (1.8m)	165 lb (75kg)	1976-07-27		4
C	51	(United States)	Mapp, Rhonda	6' 2" (1.88m)	190 lb (86kg)	1969-10-13	NC State	4
G	10	(United States)	McCrimmon, Nicky	5' 8" (1.73m)	125 lb (57kg)	1972-03-22	USC	1
F	8	(United States)	Milton-Jones, DeLisha	6' 1" (1.85m)	175 lb (79kg)	1974-09-11	Florida	2
G	20	(United States)	Willits, Wendi	5' 7" (1.7m)		1978-11-18	Arkansas	R

Head coach
(United States) Michael Cooper (New Mexico)
Assistant coaches
(United States) Glenn McDonald

Legend

- (C) Team captain
- (DP) Unsigned draft pick
- (FA) Free agent
- (S) Suspended
- Injured

== Schedule ==
=== Regular season ===
2001 game log
Total: 28–4 (Home: 16–0; Road: 12–4)
May: 1–0 (Home: 0–0; Road: 1–0)

Game	Date	Team	Score	High points	High rebounds	High assists	Location Attendance	Record
1	May 28	@ Houston	W 66–63	Byears; Leslie (15)	Latasha Byears (10)	Lisa Leslie (4)	Compaq Center	1–0

June : 9–3 (Home: 4–0; Road: 5–3)

Game	Date	Team	Score	High points	High rebounds	High assists	Location Attendance	Record
2	June 1	@ Orlando	W 68–62	Tamecka Dixon (21)	Lisa Leslie (12)	Mwadi Mabika (8)	TD Waterhouse Centre	2–0
3	June 2	@ Charlotte	W 76–67	Lisa Leslie (20)	Lisa Leslie (9)	Tamecka Dixon (4)	Charlotte Coliseum	3–0
4	June 5	Cleveland	W 58–50	Lisa Leslie (23)	Lisa Leslie (8)	Tamecka Dixon (6)	Staples Center	4–0
5	June 9	@ Minnesota	W 62–60	Lisa Leslie (17)	Lisa Leslie (16)	Dixon; Mabika (4)	Target Center	5–0
6	June 14	Orlando	W 84–68	Tamecka Dixon (18)	DeLisha Milton-Jones (7)	Figgs; Mabika (5)	Staples Center	6–0
7	June 16	@ Seattle	W 73–60	Lisa Leslie (22)	Lisa Leslie (11)	Dixon; McCrimmon (6)	KeyArena	7–0
8	June 17	Portland	W 90–75	Dixon; Leslie (13)	Mwadi Mabika (9)	Figgs; Milton-Jones (4)	Staples Center	8–0
9	June 19	Charlotte	W 73–69	Lisa Leslie (19)	Lisa Leslie (13)	Dixon; Figgs (5)	Staples Center	9–0
10	June 21	@ Houston	L 65–69	Lisa Leslie (17)	Lisa Leslie (14)	Tamecka Dixon (8)	Compaq Center	9–1
11	June 22	@ Cleveland	L 70–74	Lisa Leslie (21)	Byears; Dixon; Leslie; Milton-Jones (4)	DeLisha Milton-Jones (3)	Gund Arena	9–2
12	June 24	@ New York	L 69–82	Lisa Leslie (26)	Lisa Leslie (11)	Dixon; Leslie; Mabika; McCrimmon; Milton-Jones (2)	Madison Square Garden	9–3
13	June 26	@ Detroit	W 98–89 (OT)	Lisa Leslie (28)	Lisa Leslie (11)	Lisa Leslie (3)	The Palace of Auburn Hills	10–3

July : 12–0 (Home: 7–0; Road: 5–0)

Game	Date	Team	Score	High points	High rebounds	High assists	Location Attendance	Record
14	July 1	Miami	W 86–60	DeLisha Milton-Jones (19)	Latasha Byears (11)	Tamecka Dixon (6)	Staples Center	11–3
15	July 3	Utah	W 84–71	Lisa Leslie (18)	Latasha Byears (7)	Tamecka Dixon (7)	Staples Center	12–3
16	July 5	Phoenix	W 73–50	Lisa Leslie (23)	Lisa Leslie (15)	Figgs; Leslie (5)	Staples Center	13–3
17	July 8	Minnesota	W 100–95 (OT)	Lisa Leslie (32)	Lisa Leslie (13)	Ukari Figgs (9)	Staples Center	14–3
18	July 10	@ Utah	W 79–67	Mwadi Mabika (19)	Lisa Leslie (8)	Lisa Leslie (5)	Delta Center	15–3
19	July 11	@ Phoenix	W 75–61	Ukari Figgs (16)	DeLisha Milton-Jones (11)	Ukari Figgs (6)	America West Arena	16–3
20	July 14	@ Washington	W 62–50	Lisa Leslie (18)	Lisa Leslie (12)	Ukari Figgs (8)	MCI Center	17–3
21	July 19	@ Sacramento	W 83–68	Lisa Leslie (23)	Lisa Leslie (14)	Dixon; Figgs; Leslie; McCrimmon (4)	ARCO Arena	18–3
22	July 21	Seattle	W 85–79	Lisa Leslie (19)	DeLisha Milton-Jones (7)	Tamecka Dixon (7)	Staples Center	19–3
23	July 25	Sacramento	W 80–78	Mwadi Mabika (18)	Latasha Byears (16)	Ukari Figgs (8)	Staples Center	20–3
24	July 28	@ Portland	W 88–83	Lisa Leslie (31)	Lisa Leslie (11)	Mwadi Mabika (6)	Rose Garden	21–3
25	July 28	Minnesota	W 78–69	Lisa Leslie (28)	Lisa Leslie (8)	Ukari Figgs (5)	Staples Center	22–3

August : 6–1 (Home: 5–0; Road: 1–1)

Game	Date	Team	Score	High points	High rebounds	High assists	Location Attendance	Record
26	August 2	Sacramento	W 67–62	Lisa Leslie (23)	Leslie; Mabika (9)	Mwadi Mabika (6)	Staples Center	23–3
27	August 4	Seattle	W 79–60	Lisa Leslie (22)	Lisa Leslie (13)	Ukari Figgs (9)	Staples Center	24–3
28	August 6	Indiana	W 81–66	Lisa Leslie (23)	Lisa Leslie (13)	Leslie; McCrimmon (7)	Staples Center	25–3
29	August 8	Phoenix	W 79–67	Lisa Leslie (24)	Byears; Leslie; Mabika (6)	Mwadi Mabika (8)	Staples Center	26–3
30	August 11	Houston	W 65–54	Mwadi Mabika (22)	Latasha Byears (17)	Ukari Figgs (6)	Staples Center	27–3
31	August 13	@ Utah	L 78–80 (OT)	Tamecka Dixon (24)	Lisa Leslie (10)	Tamecka Dixon (6)	Delta Center	27–4
32	August 14	@ Portland	W 67–58	Mwadi Mabika (21)	Lisa Leslie (10)	Nicky McCrimmon (5)	Rose Garden	28–4

2001 season schedule

=== Playoffs ===
2001 playoff game log
First round vs. Houston Comets
Won Series: 2–0

Game	Date	Team	Score	High points	High rebounds	High assists	Location Attendance	Series
1	August 18	@ Houston	W 64–59	Lisa Leslie (19)	Lisa Leslie (11)	Ukari Figgs (4)	Compaq Center	1–0
2	August 20	Houston	W 70–58	Lisa Leslie (28)	Lisa Leslie (18)	Ukari Figgs (9)	Staples Center	2–0

Conference Finals vs. Sacramento Monarchs
Won Series: 2–1

Game	Date	Team	Score	High points	High rebounds	High assists	Location Attendance	Series
1	August 25	@ Sacramento	W 74–73	Mabika; Milton-Jones (15)	Lisa Leslie (10)	Dixon; Figgs (6)	ARCO Arena	1–0
2	August 26	Sacramento	L 60–80	Lisa Leslie (13)	Mwadi Mabika (11)	Ukari Figgs (6)	Staples Center	1–1
3	August 27	Sacramento	W 93–62	Lisa Leslie (35)	Lisa Leslie (16)	Ukari Figgs (10)	Staples Center	2–1

Championship vs. Charlotte Sting
Won Series: 2–0

Game	Date	Team	Score	High points	High rebounds	High assists	Location Attendance	Series
1	August 30	@ Charlotte	W 75–66	Lisa Leslie (24)	Leslie; Milton-Jones (8)	DeLisha Milton-Jones (5)	Charlotte Coliseum	1–0
2	September 1	Charlotte	W 82–54	Lisa Leslie (24)	Lisa Leslie (13)	Tamecka Dixon (7)	Staples Center	2–0

2001 playoff schedule

=== Season standings ===
Western Conference	W	L	PCT	Conf.	GB
Los Angeles Sparks ^{x}	28	4	.875	19–2	–
Sacramento Monarchs ^{x}	20	12	.625	13–8	8.0
Utah Starzz ^{x}	19	13	.594	11–10	9.0
Houston Comets ^{x}	19	13	.594	13–8	9.0
Phoenix Mercury ^{o}	13	19	.406	8–13	15.0
Minnesota Lynx ^{o}	12	20	.375	9–12	16.0
Portland Fire ^{o}	11	21	.344	5–16	17.0
Seattle Storm ^{o}	10	22	.313	6–15	18.0

== Statistics ==
Legend
GP	Games played	GS	Games started	MPG	Minutes per game	RPG	Rebounds per game
APG	Assists per game	SPG	Steals per game	BPG	Blocks per game	PPG	Points per game
FG%	Field-goal percentage	3P%	3-point field-goal percentage	FT%	Free-throw percentage	TO	Turnovers per game
PF	Fouls per game		Team leader		League leader

=== Regular season ===
Player	GP	GS	MPG	FG%	3P%	FT%	RPG	APG	SPG	BPG	PPG
Lisa Leslie	31	31	33.3	.473	.367	.736	9.6	2.4	1.1	2.3	19.5
Tamecka Dixon	29	29	31.9	.417	.176	.791	2.9	3.9	0.9	0.1	11.7
Mwadi Mabika	28	24	29.6	.387	.382	.861	4.6	3.1	1.4	0.4	11.2
DeLisha Milton-Jones	32	27	29.3	.453	.343	.794	5.3	2.1	1.5	0.9	10.3
Ukari Figgs	32	29	29.1	.425	.462	.810	3.1	3.9	1.3	0.1	8.0
Latasha Byears	32	13	23.1	.602	.333	.577	5.7	0.9	1.3	0.4	9.3
Rhonda Mapp	30	0	13.2	.415	.000	.750	2.6	0.5	0.5	0.2	4.2
Nicky McCrimmon	28	0	12.5	.444	.417	.429	0.4	2.3	0.8	0.0	2.3
Vedrana Grgin-Fonseca	24	7	9.3	.431	.316	.643	1.5	0.5	0.2	0.0	3.0
Nicole Levandusky	13	0	5.2	.318	.294	1.000	0.7	0.5	0.4	0.1	1.5
Wendi Willits	13	0	3.6	.300	.154	.750	0.4	0.2	0.1	0.0	1.3

^{‡}Waived/Released during the season
^{†}Traded during the season
^{≠}Acquired during the season

== Awards and honors ==
- Lisa Leslie, WNBA Finals MVP Award
- Lisa Leslie, WNBA Most Valuable Player Award
- Latasha Byears, WNBA Peak Performer
