= List of WNBA season turnovers leaders =

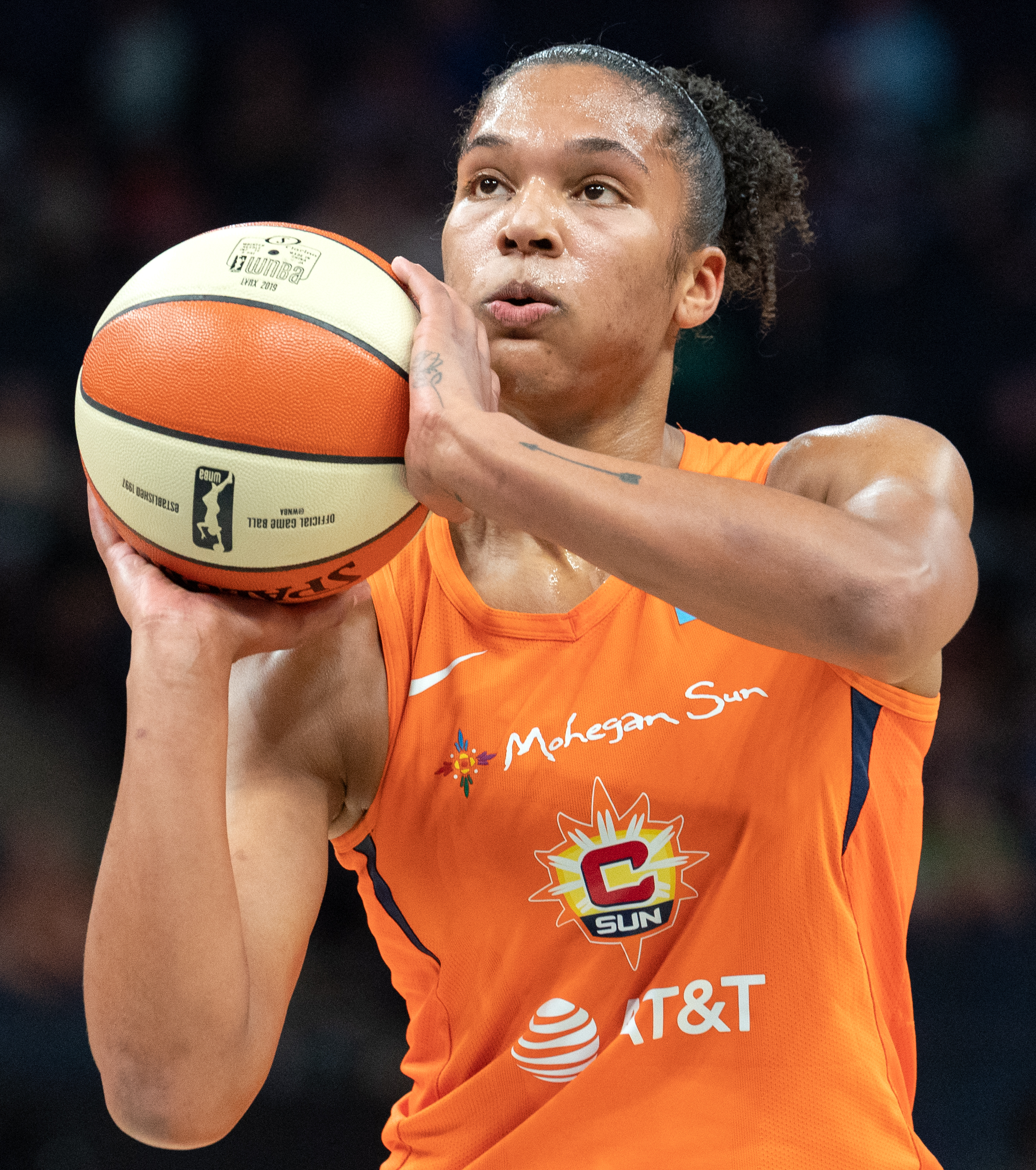
Alyssa Thomas (pictured) along with Angel McCoughtry, Lisa Leslie and Becky Hammon have all lead the league in turnovers three times, the most in WNBA history.

In basketball, an turnover occurs when a team loses possession of the ball to the opposing team before a player takes a shot at their team's basket. The Women's National Basketball Association's (WNBA) total turnovers is awarded to the player with the highest total turnovers in a given season.

Caitlin Clark holds the all-time record for most turnovers in a single season (223) which was achieved in the 2024 season.

Alyssa Thomas, Angel McCoughtry, Lisa Leslie and Becky Hammon have all lead the Women's National Basketball Association's (WNBA) in turnovers in a single season with three each. Sue Bird and Caitlin Clark have each lead the league in turnovers two times. Angel McCoughtry also holds the record for consecutive seasons leading the league in turnovers with three accomplishing this in the 2013 season, 2014 season, and 2015 season. Sue Bird is the only other player with consecutive seasons leading the league in turnovers accomplishing this in the 2002 season, and 2003 season.

== Key ==
^		Denotes player who is still active in the WNBA			
*		Inducted into the Naismith Memorial Basketball Hall of Fame			
†		Not yet eligible for Hall of Fame consideration (Note: A player is not eligible for induction into the Naismith Memorial Basketball Hall of Fame until she has been fully retired for two calendar years.)			
§		1st time eligible for Hall of Fame in 2025			
Player (X)		Denotes the number of times the player had been the assists leader up to and including that season			
G	Guard	F	Forward	C	Center

== Annual leaders ==
Season	Player	Team	Total Turnovers
1997	Chantel Tremitiere	Sacramento Monarchs	122
1998	Nikki McCray	Washington Mystics	125
1999	Ticha Penicheiro	Sacramento Monarchs	135
2000	Lisa Leslie*	Los Angeles Sparks	103
2001	Dawn Staley*	Charlotte Sting	100
2001	Rita Williams	Indiana Fever	100
2002	Sue Bird*	Seattle Storm	109
2003	Sue Bird* (2)	Seattle Storm	110
2004	Becky Hammon*	New York Liberty	118
2005	Shannon Johnson	San Antonio Silver Stars	113
2006	Lisa Leslie* (2)	Los Angeles Sparks	126
2007	DeLisha Milton-Jones	Washington Mystics	121
2008	Lisa Leslie* (3)	Los Angeles Sparks	119
2009	Becky Hammon* (2)	San Antonio Silver Stars	111
2010	Diana Taurasi†	Phoenix Mercury	110
2011	Becky Hammon* (3)	San Antonio Silver Stars	119
2012	Kristi Toliver†	Los Angeles Sparks	124
2013	Angel McCoughtry	Atlanta Dream	134
2014	Angel McCoughtry (2)	Atlanta Dream	116
2015	Angel McCoughtry (3)	Atlanta Dream	107
2016	Candace Parker*	Los Angeles Sparks	98
2017	Alyssa Thomas^	Connecticut Sun	98
2018	Courtney Vandersloot^	Chicago Sky	104
2019	Odyssey Sims^	Minnesota Lynx	112
2020	Skylar Diggins-Smith^	Phoenix Mercury	70
2021	Betnijah Laney^	New York Liberty	119
2022	Natasha Howard^	New York Liberty	113
2023	Alyssa Thomas^ (2)	Connecticut Sun	137
2024	Caitlin Clark^	Indiana Fever	223
2025	Alyssa Thomas^ (3)	Phoenix Mercury	135
2026	Caitlin Clark^ (2)	Indiana Fever	183

== Multiple-time leaders ==
Rank	Player	Team	Times leader	Years
1	Alyssa Thomas	Connecticut Sun (2) / Phoenix Mercury (1)	3	2017, 2023, 2025
1	Angel McCoughtry	Atlanta Dream	3	2013, 2014, 2015
1	Becky Hammon	New York Liberty (1) / San Antonio Silver Stars (2)	3	2004, 2009, 2011
1	Lisa Leslie	Los Angeles Sparks	3	2000, 2006, 2008
5	Sue Bird	Seattle Storm	2	2002, 2003
5	Caitlin Clark	Indiana Fever	2	2024, 2026

== See also ==
- List of National Basketball Association career turnovers leaders
