= 2006 Washington Mystics season =

- Head coach: Richie Adubato
- Arena: Verizon Center

Results
- Record: 18–16 (.529)
- Place: 4th (Eastern)
- Playoff finish: Lost First Round (2-0) to Connecticut Sun

The 2006 WNBA season was the ninth for the Washington Mystics. The Mystics reached the playoffs, but they were later swept in the opening round to the Connecticut Sun.

== Offseason ==
=== WNBA draft ===
Round	Pick	Player	Nationality	School/Club team
1	8	Tamara James (G/F)	United States	Miami (FL)
2	19	Nikki Blue (G)	United States	UCLA
3	33	Miriam Sy (C)	United States	Oklahoma City

== Regular season ==
=== Season standings ===
Eastern Conference	W	L	PCT	GB	Home	Road	Conf.
z - Connecticut Sun	26	8	.765	–	14–3	12–5	15–5
x - Detroit Shock	23	11	.676	3.0	14–3	9–8	14–6
x - Indiana Fever	21	13	.618	5.0	12–5	9–8	12–8
x - Washington Mystics	18	16	.529	8.0	13–4	5–12	12–8
e - New York Liberty	11	23	.324	15.0	7–10	4–13	7–13
e - Charlotte Sting	11	23	.324	15.0	7–10	4–3	6–14
e - Chicago Sky	5	29	.147	21.0	3–14	2–15	4–16

=== Season schedule ===
Date	Opponent	Score	Result	Record
May 23	New York	95-60	Win	1-0
May 25	@ Charlotte	63-73	Loss	1-1
May 27	Minnesota	90-75	Win	2-1
June 3	Detroit	92-68	Win	3-1
June 6	Houston	93-79	Win	4-1
June 7	@ Indiana	70-83	Loss	4-2
June 11	@ Connecticut	71-85	Loss	4-3
June 13	Charlotte	87-70	Win	5-3
June 15	@ Charlotte	96-77	Win	6-3
June 17	New York	88-70	Win	7-3
June 21	@ New York	66-72	Loss	7-4
June 24	@ Detroit	86-92	Loss	7-5
June 25	Connecticut	87-80	Win	8-5
June 27	Indiana	67-74	Loss	8-6
June 29	@ Houston	76-83	Loss	8-7
July 1	@ Los Angeles	75-80	Loss	8-8
July 2	@ Phoenix	81-78	Win	9-8
July 5	@ Minnesota	74-84	Loss	9-9
July 7	Sacramento	60-73	Loss	9-10
July 9	Chicago	89-83	Win	10-10
July 16	@ Chicago	83-76	Win	11-10
July 19	Phoenix	83-96	Loss	11-11
July 21	@ San Antonio	80-77	Win	12-11
July 23	Seattle	71-73	Loss	12-12
July 25	@ Connecticut	73-86	Loss	12-13
July 27	Chicago	92-74	Win	13-13
July 29	@ Indiana	74-67	Win	14-13
July 30	Charlotte	78-73	Win	15-13
August 1	Los Angeles	84-74	Win	16-13
August 3	@ Seattle	78-86	Loss	16-14
August 5	@ Sacramento	95-99 (OT)	Loss	16-15
August 8	San Antonio	91-79	Win	17-15
August 11	Detroit	78-66	Win	18-15
August 13	@ New York	81-93	Loss	18-16

== Playoffs ==
Game	Date	Opponent	Score	Result	Record
Eastern Conference Semifinals
1	August 18	Connecticut	61-76	Loss	0-1
2	August 20	@ Connecticut	65-68	Loss	0-2

== Player stats ==
Player	GP	REB	AST	STL	BLK	PTS
Alana Beard	32	149	98	59	25	614
Chasity Melvin	34	224	45	34	26	405
Nikki Teasley	34	89	183	44	11	364
DeLisha Milton-Jones	23	112	48	35	17	335
Nakia Sanford	34	203	36	28	21	301
Coco Miller	34	91	59	34	4	206
Crystal Robinson	27	70	49	33	0	199
Latasha Byears	26	87	10	12	2	112
Laurie Koehn	32	12	8	2	2	71
Tamara James	21	16	3	4	2	57
Nikki Blue	24	20	36	18	0	54
Zane Teilane	16	27	1	3	3	29
