= Nikki Teasley =

American basketball player (born 1979)

Personal information
- Born: March 22, 1979 (age 47) Washington D.C., U.S.
- Listed height: 6 ft 0 in (1.83 m)
- Listed weight: 169 lb (77 kg)

Career information
- High school: Saint John's Catholic Prep (Buckeystown, Maryland)
- College: North Carolina (1997–2002)
- WNBA draft: 2002: 1st round, 5th overall pick
- Drafted by: Portland Fire
- Playing career: 2002–2009
- Position: Point guard
- Number: 42

Career history
- 2002–2005: Los Angeles Sparks
- 2006–2007: Washington Mystics
- 2008–2009: Atlanta Dream
- 2009: Detroit Shock

Career highlights
- WNBA champion (2002); WNBA All-Star (2003); WNBA All-Star game MVP (2003); 2× All-WNBA Second Team (2003–2004); 2× WNBA assists leader (2004, 2006); First-team All-ACC (2002); ACC Tournament MVP (2000); ACC Rookie of the Year (1998); ACC All-Freshman Team (1998); Gatorade National Player of the Year (1997)
- Stats at WNBA.com
- Stats at Basketball Reference
Medals
Women's basketball
Representing United States
FIBA Under-19 World Cup
Gold medal – first place	1997 Brazil	Team competition
FIBA Under-18 Americas Championship
Silver medal – second place	1996 Mexico	Team

Nikki Teasley (born March 22, 1979) is an American former basketball player in the Women's National Basketball Association (WNBA).

Born in Washington, D.C., she played college basketball at the University of North Carolina at Chapel Hill.

In the 2002 WNBA draft, Teasley was selected as the #5 overall pick by the Portland Fire. But shortly afterwards, she was traded with Sophia Witherspoon to the Los Angeles Sparks for Ukari Figgs and second-round pick Gergana Slavtcheva.

Teasley helped the Sparks win their second consecutive title by hitting a series-winning three-pointer in the final seconds.

On March 24, 2008, Teasley was waived by the Washington Mystics.

The Atlanta Dream signed Teasley in 2008 and she suited up for the 2009 season. Teasley was then waived for Ivory Latta.

== Career statistics ==
Legend
GP	Games played	GS	Games started	MPG	Minutes per game	RPG	Rebounds per game
APG	Assists per game	SPG	Steals per game	BPG	Blocks per game	PPG	Points per game
TO	Turnovers per game	FG%	Field-goal percentage	3P%	3-point field-goal percentage	FT%	Free-throw percentage
**Bold**	Career best	°	League leader

†	Denotes season(s) in which Teasley won a WNBA championship

=== WNBA ===
==== Regular season ====
WNBA regular season statistics
Year	Team	GP	GS	MPG	FG%	3P%	FT%	RPG	APG	SPG	BPG	TO	PPG
2002^{†}	Los Angeles	32	32	27.6	**40.4**	40.0	75.0	2.6	4.4	0.8	0.3	2.1	6.4
2003	Los Angeles	**34**	**34**	**35.0**	38.9	**42.4**	87.5	**5.1**	**6.3**	1.1	**0.4**	3.2	**11.5**
2004	Los Angeles	**34**	**34**	32.5	38.8	41.2	76.5	3.4	6.1	1.2	0.2	3.0	9.9
2005	Los Angeles	19	19	29.0	33.3	30.9	84.6	2.8	3.7	1.2	0.2	2.5	7.4
2006	Washington	**34**	**34**	28.8	37.1	34.4	82.6	2.6	5.4	**1.3**	0.3	2.3	10.7
2007	Washington	33	33	22.6	33.6	32.9	93.3	2.2	3.3	0.7	0.2	1.9	5.2
2008	Did not play (waived)												
2009	Atlanta	10	10	23.4	40.0	41.2	80.0	1.7	3.5	0.9	0.1	**1.2**	3.9
2009	Detroit	11	7	20.2	38.5	33.3	**100.0**	1.3	2.2	0.5	**0.4**	1.5	3.8
**Career**	7 years, 4 teams	207	203	28.5	37.6	37.7	83.5	3.0	4.7	1.0	0.3	2.4	8.2
**Career**	All-Star	1	0	24.4	33.3	40.0	100.0	6.0	6.0	5.0	0.0	0.0	10.0

==== Playoffs ====
WNBA playoffs statistics
Year	Team	GP	GS	MPG	FG%	3P%	FT%	RPG	APG	SPG	BPG	TO	PPG
2002^{†}	Los Angeles	6	6	30.7	33.3	22.7	84.2	2.2	7.8	**1.5**	0.2	3.7	8.2
2003	Los Angeles	**9**	**9**	**34.7**	32.8	22.2	80.0	4.4	**7.9**	1.3	0.0	3.0	7.8
2004	Los Angeles	3	3	29.3	26.3	33.3	**100.0**	1.0	5.3	0.7	**0.3**	4.7	6.3
2005	Los Angeles	2	1	30.5	33.3	18.2	66.7	2.5	7.0	**1.5**	0.0	**1.5**	**11.0**
2006	Washington	2	2	33.5	33.3	0.0	85.7	**5.0**	4.0	0.5	0.0	3.5	10.0
2009	Detroit	5	5	16.6	**44.4**	**40.0**	66.7	0.2	1.8	0.2	0.2	1.8	4.8
**Career**	6 years, 3 teams	27	26	29.4	33.5	23.2	80.0	2.7	6.1	1.0	0.1	3.0	7.6

=== College ===
NCAA statistics
Year	Team	GP	Points	FG%	3P%	FT%	RPG	APG	SPG	BPG	PPG
1997–98	North Carolina	30	387	**41.5%**	35.9%	77.1%	3.5	5.5	1.9	0.1	12.9
1998–99	North Carolina	**36**	**555**	41.3%	31.3%	68.7%	**4.7**	**5.9**	**2.6**	**0.528**	**15.4**
1999-00	North Carolina	26	379	39.0%	31.7%	81.5%	4.0	6.2	2.3	0.192	14.6
2000-01	North Carolina	Did not play									
2001-02	North Carolina	33	501	36.7%	**36.8%**	**86.3%**	4.4	5.7	2.1	0.394	15.2
**Career**		125	1822	39.6%	34.0%	77.9%	4.2	5.8	2.2	0.3	14.6
