= 2002 WNBA Finals =

Women's basketball championship game

Team	Coach	Wins
Los Angeles Sparks	Michael Cooper	2
New York Liberty	Richie Adubato	0
- Dates: August 29 – 31
- MVP: Lisa Leslie (Los Angeles Sparks)
- Hall of Famers: Sparks: Lisa Leslie (2015); Liberty: Becky Hammon (2023); Teresa Weatherspoon (2019); Coaches: Michael Cooper (2024, player)
- Eastern finals: New York defeated Washington, 2–1
- Western finals: Los Angeles defeated Utah, 2–0

The 2002 WNBA Finals was the championship series of the 2002 WNBA season and the conclusion of the season's playoffs. The Los Angeles Sparks finished the regular season with a 25–7 record and as the Western Conference's number-one seed. They matched up against the New York Liberty, who finished with an 18–14 record and as the number-one seed of the Eastern Conference. Holding the better record, the Sparks received home-court advantage over the Liberty. The series was the first championship series to be branded as the "WNBA Finals", as the league's championship was previously called the "WNBA Championship" from 1997 to 2001.

The series marked the fourth WNBA Finals appearance for the Liberty and second for the Sparks. For the Sparks, it also marked their second straight Finals appearance, going into the series as defending champions. The Sparks defeated the Liberty two games to none in the best-of-three series, winning their second consecutive championship. The 2001-02 Sparks would be the last team to win back-to-back championships until the Las Vegas Aces did so in 2022 and 2023. The 2002 NBA Finals coincidentally also saw the Los Angeles Lakers of the NBA win their respective championship series by sweeping a New York metro area team, the New Jersey Nets 4–0.

== Road to the finals ==
Los Angeles Sparks		New York Liberty
25–7 (.781); 1st West, 1st overall	Regular season	18–14 (.562); 1st East, 4th overall
Defeated the (4) Seattle Storm, 2–0	Conference Semifinals	Defeated the (4) Indiana Fever, 2–1
Defeated the (3) Utah Starzz, 2–0	Conference Finals	Defeated the (3) Washington Mystics, 2–1

=== Regular season series ===
The teams had split the regular season series:

May 25

New York Liberty 64, Los Angeles Sparks 72

STAPLES Center, Los Angeles

July 18

Los Angeles Sparks 59, New York Liberty 72

Madison Square Garden, New York

== Game summaries ==
All times listed below are Eastern Daylight Time.

=== Game 1 ===
ESPN2

August 29
7:30pm

"Game 1". Archived from the original on November 26, 2002.

Los Angeles Sparks 71, New York Liberty 63
Scoring by half: 35–35, 36–28
Pts: Mabika 20; Rebs: Byears 11	Pts: Hammon 18; Rebs: Weatherspoon 7
L.A. Sparks leads series, 1–0

Madison Square Garden, New York City
Attendance: 17,666

=== Game 2 ===
NBC

August 31
3:30pm

"Game 2". Archived from the original on November 26, 2002.

New York Liberty 66, Los Angeles Sparks 69
Scoring by half: 24–31, 42–38
Pts: Johnson, Whitmore 17; Rebs: Phillips 8	Pts: Leslie 17; Rebs: Byears 11
L.A. Sparks wins WNBA Finals, 2–0

Staples Center, Los Angeles
Attendance: 13,493

Nikki Teasley hit a series-winning three pointer with 2.1 seconds left. Teresa Weatherspoon tried to repeat history by trying to make a halfcourt heave at the buzzer, but the shot was blocked, and the Sparks won their second consecutive title.

== Awards ==
- 2002 WNBA champion: Los Angeles Sparks
- Finals MVP: Lisa Leslie

== Rosters ==
2002 Los Angeles Sparks Finals roster
Players
Coaches

Pos.	No.	Nat.	Name	Height	Weight	From
C	41	(Germany)	Askamp, Marlies	6' 5" (1.96m)	198 lb (90kg)	Germany
F	00	(United States)	Byears, Latasha	5' 11" (1.8m)	206 lb (93kg)	DePaul
F	14	(Brazil)	DeSouza, Erika	6' 5" (1.96m)	190 lb (86kg)	Brazil
G	21	(United States)	Dixon, Tamecka	5' 9" (1.75m)	148 lb (67kg)	Kansas
F	17	(Croatia)	Grgin-Fonseca, Vedrana	6' 1" (1.85m)	160 lb (73kg)	Croatia
C	9	(United States)	Leslie, Lisa	6' 5" (1.96m)	170 lb (77kg)	USC
F	4	(Democratic Republic of the Congo)	Mabika, Mwadi	5' 11" (1.8m)	165 lb (75kg)	Democratic Republic of the Congo
G	10	(United States)	McCrimmon, Nicky	5' 8" (1.73m)	125 lb (57kg)	USC
F	8	(United States)	Milton, Delisha	6' 1" (1.85m)	172 lb (78kg)	Florida
G	42	(United States)	Teasley, Nikki	6' 0" (1.83m)	165 lb (75kg)	North Carolina
G	13	(United States)	Witherspoon, Sophia	5' 10" (1.78m)	145 lb (66kg)	Florida

Head coach
(United States) Michael Cooper (New Mexico)
Assistant coaches
(United States) Glenn McDonald
(United States) Karleen Thompson

Legend

- (C) Team captain
- (DP) Unsigned draft pick
- (FA) Free agent
- (S) Suspended
- Injured

2002 New York Liberty Finals roster
Players
Coaches

Pos.	No.	Nat.	Name	Height	Weight	From
C	42	(United States)	Cooper, Camille	6' 4" (1.93m)	176 lb (80kg)	Purdue
F	31	(United States)	Frohlich, Linda	6' 2" (1.88m)	183 lb (83kg)	University of Nevada, Las Vegas
G	25	(United States)	Hammon, Becky	5' 6" (1.68m)	136 lb (62kg)	Colorado State
G	7	(Croatia)	Hlede, Korie	5' 9" (1.75m)	150 lb (68kg)	Duquesne
G	55	(United States)	Johnson, Vickie	5' 9" (1.75m)	150 lb (68kg)	Louisiana Tech
C	50	(Democratic Republic of the Congo)	Ngoyisa, Bernadette	6' 4" (1.93m)	195 lb (88kg)	Democratic Republic of the Congo
F	24	(United States)	Phillips, Tari	6' 1" (1.85m)	200 lb (91kg)	University of Central Florida
F	3	(United States)	Robinson, Crystal	5' 10" (1.78m)	175 lb (79kg)	Southeastern Oklahoma State University
G	11	(United States)	Weatherspoon, Teresa	5' 8" (1.73m)	161 lb (73kg)	Louisiana Tech
F	44	(United States)	Whitmore, Tamika	6' 2" (1.88m)	190 lb (86kg)	Memphis
F	23	(United States)	Wicks, Sue	6' 3" (1.91m)	174 lb (79kg)	Rutgers

Head coach
(United States) Richie Adubato (William Paterson)
Assistant coaches
(United States) Pat Coyle (Rutgers)
(United States) Jeff House

Legend

- (C) Team captain
- (DP) Unsigned draft pick
- (FA) Free agent
- (S) Suspended
- Injured
