= 2003 Los Angeles Sparks season =

- Head coach: Michael Cooper
- Arena: Staples Center

Results
- Record: 24–10 (.706)
- Place: 1st (Western)
- Playoff finish: Lost WNBA Finals (2-1) to Detroit Shock

The 2003 WNBA season was the seventh season for the Los Angeles Sparks franchise. The Sparks reached the WNBA Finals for the third consecutive season, but fell to the Detroit Shock in three games.

== Offseason ==
=== Dispersal Draft ===
Pick	Player	Nationality	Former team
14	Jackie Stiles (G)	United States	Portland Fire

=== WNBA draft ===
Round	Pick	Player	Nationality	College/School/Team
2	27	Schuye LaRue (F)	United States	Virginia
3	42	Mary Jo Noon (C)	United States	Purdue

== Regular season ==
=== Season standings ===
Western Conference	W	L	PCT	GB	Home	Road	Conf.
Los Angeles Sparks ^{x}	24	10	.706	–	11–6	13–4	17–7
Houston Comets ^{x}	20	14	.588	4.0	14–3	6–11	14–10
Sacramento Monarchs ^{x}	19	15	.559	5.0	12–5	7–10	13–11
Minnesota Lynx ^{x}	18	16	.529	6.0	11–6	7–10	14–10
Seattle Storm ^{o}	18	16	.529	6.0	13–4	5–12	11–13
San Antonio Silver Stars ^{o}	12	22	.353	12.0	9–8	3–14	10–14
Phoenix Mercury ^{o}	8	26	.235	16.0	6–11	2–15	5–19

=== Season schedule ===
Date	Opponent	Score	Result	Record
May 24	@ Connecticut	82-73	Win	1-0
May 27	@ Cleveland	79-71	Win	2-0
May 28	@ Minnesota	83-80	Win	3-0
May 30	@ Seattle	77-74 (OT)	Win	4-0
June 5	Sacramento	63-61	Win	5-0
June 7	@ Sacramento	79-61	Win	6-0
June 10	Minnesota	76-75	Win	7-0
June 12	Indiana	74-66	Win	8-0
June 14	@ New York	67-60	Win	9-0
June 17	@ Detroit	78-87 (OT)	Loss	9-1
June 19	Seattle	67-69	Loss	9-2
June 21	@ Phoenix	54-48	Win	10-2
June 24	@ Houston	71-62	Win	11-2
June 26	@ San Antonio	67-58	Win	12-2
June 28	Sacramento	60-69	Loss	12-3
July 5	Seattle	84-75	Win	13-3
July 7	Cleveland	81-75	Win	14-3
July 9	@ Washington	97-91	Win	15-3
July 15	Phoenix	80-77 (OT)	Win	16-3
July 18	Houston	74-79	Loss	16-4
July 20	Connecticut	73-76	Loss	16-5
July 22	Washington	77-73	Win	17-5
July 24	Phoenix	82-65	Win	18-5
July 30	San Antonio	62-70	Loss	18-6
July 31	@ Sacramento	75-83	Loss	18-7
August 2	Charlotte	73-84	Loss	18-8
August 6	@ Seattle	56-92	Loss	18-9
August 8	@ Phoenix	67-64	Win	19-9
August 9	@ San Antonio	52-69	Loss	19-10
August 14	@ Minnesota	87-83	Win	20-10
August 16	@ Houston	64-63	Win	21-10
August 21	Minnesota	88-65	Win	22-10
August 23	San Antonio	83-70	Win	23-10
August 25	Houston	67-64	Win	24-10
August 28; 1st Round, G1	@ Minnesota	72-74	Loss	0-1
August 30; 1st Round, G2	Minnesota	80-69	Win	1-1
September 1; 1st Round, G3	Minnesota	74-64	Win	2-1
September 5 West Finals, G1	@ Sacramento	69-77	Loss	2-2
September 7 West Finals, G2	Sacramento	79-54	Win	3-2
September 8 West Finals, G3	Sacramento	66-63	Win	4-2
September 12; WNBA Finals, G1	Detroit	75-63	Win	5-2
September 14; WNBA Finals, G2	@ Detroit	61-62	Loss	5-3
September 16; WNBA Finals, G3	@ Detroit	78-83	Loss	5-4

== Player stats ==
Player	Games Played	Rebounds	Assists	Steals	Blocks	Points
Mwadi Mabika	32	141	82	30	18	441
Lisa Leslie	23	231	46	31	63	424
DeLisha Milton-Jones	31	220	64	49	41	416
Tamecka Dixon	30	126	89	35	10	412
Nikki Teasley	34	175	214	39	15	392
Jennifer Gillom	33	55	21	16	3	103
Nicky McCrimmon	33	29	32	19	1	68
Rhonda Mapp	24	68	6	7	6	62
Sophia Witherspoon	23	19	4	7	0	56
Shaquala Williams	25	32	19	6	0	49
Vanessa Nygaard	11	19	5	3	0	41
Latasha Byears	5	21	2	0	2	28
Chandra Johnson	8	6	3	0	1	6
Lynn Pride	4	6	0	0	0	1
Jenny Mowe	1	1	0	0	1	0
