= 2001 WNBA Championship =

Women's basketball series

2001 WNBA Finals
Team	Coach	Wins
Los Angeles Sparks	Michael Cooper	2
Charlotte Sting	Anne Donovan	0
- Dates: August 30-September 1
- MVP: Lisa Leslie (Los Angeles Sparks)
- Hall of Famers: Sparks: Lisa Leslie (2015); Sting: Dawn Staley (2013); Coaches: Michael Cooper (2024, player); Anne Donovan (1995, player)
- Eastern finals: Charlotte defeated New York, 2–1
- Western finals: Los Angeles defeated Sacramento, 2–1

The 2001 WNBA Championship was the championship series of the 2001 WNBA season, and the conclusion of the season's playoffs. The Los Angeles Sparks, top-seeded champions of the Western Conference, defeated the Charlotte Sting, fourth-seeded champions of the Eastern Conference, two games to none in a best-of-three series. This was Los Angeles' first title.

The Sparks made their first appearance in the Finals in franchise history. The Sting also made their first Finals appearance.

Going into the series, no other team except the Houston Comets had ever won a WNBA championship (1997-2000).

The Sparks had a 28–4 record (.875), good enough to receive home-court advantage over the Sting (18–14). It did not matter, however, as the Sparks swept the Sting.

== Road to the finals ==
Los Angeles Sparks		Charlotte Sting
28–4 (.875); 1st West, 1st overall	Regular season	18–14 (.562); 4th East, 8th overall
Defeated the (4) Houston Comets, 2–0	Conference Semifinals	Defeated the (1) Cleveland Rockers, 2–1
Defeated the (2) Sacramento Monarchs, 2–1	Conference Finals	Defeated the (2) New York Liberty, 2–1

=== Regular season series ===
The Sparks won the regular season series:

June 2

Recap at the Wayback Machine (archived October 6, 2001)

Los Angeles Sparks 76, Charlotte Sting 67

Charlotte Coliseum, Charlotte
Attendance: 12,843

June 19

Recap at the Wayback Machine (archived December 14, 2001)

Charlotte Sting 69, Los Angeles Sparks 73

Staples Center, Los Angeles
Attendance: 8,823

== Game summaries ==
All times listed below are Eastern Daylight Time.

=== Game 1 ===
ESPN

August 30

Recap at the Wayback Machine (archived October 6, 2001)

Los Angeles Sparks 75, Charlotte Sting 66
Scoring by half: 35–39, 40–27
Pts: Leslie (24); Rebs: Leslie, Milton (8); Asts: Milton (5)	Pts: Stinson (18); Rebs: Feaster (5); Asts: Stinson (5)
L.A Sparks leads series, 1–0

Charlotte Coliseum, Charlotte
Attendance: 16,132
Referees:
- Melissa Barlow
- Michael Price
- Gary Zielinski

=== Game 2 ===
NBC

September 1

Recap at the Wayback Machine (archived October 31, 2001)

Charlotte Sting 54, Los Angeles Sparks 82
Scoring by half: 30–38, 24–44
Pts: Sutton-Brown (12); Rebs: Smith (8); Asts: Staley (5)	Pts: Leslie (24); Rebs: Leslie (13); Asts: Dixon (7)
L.A Sparks wins WNBA Finals, 2–0

STAPLES Center, Los Angeles
Attendance: 13,141
Referees:
- Patty Broderick
- June Corteau
- Bob Trammell

== Awards ==
- 2001 WNBA champion: Los Angeles Sparks
- Finals MVP: Lisa Leslie

== Rosters ==
2001 Los Angeles Sparks Finals roster
Players
Coaches

Pos.	No.	Nat.	Name	Height	Weight	From
F	00	(United States)	Byears, Latasha	5' 11" (1.8m)	206 lb (93kg)	DePaul
G	21	(United States)	Dixon, Tamecka	5' 9" (1.75m)	148 lb (67kg)	Kansas
G	5	(United States)	Figgs, Ukari	5' 9" (1.75m)	142 lb (64kg)	Purdue
F	17	(Croatia)	Grgin-Fonseca, Vedrana	6' 1" (1.85m)	160 lb (73kg)	Croatia
C	9	(United States)	Leslie, Lisa	6' 5" (1.96m)	170 lb (77kg)	USC
G	40	(United States)	Levandusky, Nicole	5' 8" (1.73m)	163 lb (74kg)	Xavier
F	4	(Democratic Republic of the Congo)	Mabika, Mwadi	5' 11" (1.8m)	165 lb (75kg)	Democratic Republic of the Congo
C	51	(United States)	Mapp, Rhonda	6' 2" (1.88m)	190 lb (86kg)	NC State
G	10	(United States)	McCrimmon, Nicky	5' 8" (1.73m)	125 lb (57kg)	USC
F	8	(United States)	Milton, Delisha	6' 1" (1.85m)	172 lb (78kg)	Florida
G	20	(United States)	Willits, Wendy	5' 7" (1.7m)	141 lb (64kg)	Arkansas

Head coach
(United States) Michael Cooper (New Mexico)
Assistant coaches
(United States) Glenn McDonald

Legend

- (C) Team captain
- (DP) Unsigned draft pick
- (FA) Free agent
- (S) Suspended
- Injured

2001 Charlotte Sting Finals roster
Players
Coaches

Pos.	No.	Nat.	Name	Height	Weight	From
G	20	(United States)	Anderson, Keisha	5' 7" (1.7m)	125 lb (57kg)	Wisconsin
G	13	(United States)	Edwards, Tonya	5' 10" (1.78m)	160 lb (73kg)	Tennessee
F	7	(United States)	Enis, Shalonda	6' 1" (1.85m)	185 lb (84kg)	Alabama
C	3	(United States)	Erb, Summer	6' 6" (1.98m)	240 lb (109kg)	NC State
F	21	(United States)	Feaster, Allison	5' 11" (1.8m)	168 lb (76kg)	Harvard University
C	33	(Mozambique)	Machanguana, Clarisse	6' 5" (1.96m)	180 lb (82kg)	Old Dominion
G	8	(United States)	Miller, Kelly	5' 9" (1.75m)	144 lb (65kg)	Georgia
F	23	(United States)	Smith, Charlotte	6' 0" (1.83m)	148 lb (67kg)	North Carolina
G	5	(United States)	Staley, Dawn	5' 6" (1.68m)	134 lb (61kg)	Virginia
G	32	(United States)	Stinson, Andrea	5' 10" (1.78m)	158 lb (72kg)	NC State
C	55	(Canada)	Sutton-Brown, Tammy	6' 4" (1.93m)	203 lb (92kg)	Rutgers

Head coach
(United States) Anne Donovan (Old Dominion)
Assistant coaches
(United States) Trudi Lacey
(United States) Cheryl Reeve

Legend

- (C) Team captain
- (DP) Unsigned draft pick
- (FA) Free agent
- (S) Suspended
- Injured
