= Nicky McCrimmon =

American basketball player (born 1972)

Personal information
- Born: March 22, 1972 (age 54) Manhattan, New York, U.S.
- Listed height: 5 ft 8 in (1.73 m)
- Listed weight: 125 lb (57 kg)

Career information
- High school: Murry Bergtraum (New York City, New York)
- College: New Mexico JC (1990–1992); USC (1992–1994)
- WNBA draft: 2000: 4th round, 63rd overall pick
- Drafted by: Los Angeles Sparks
- Playing career: 1997–2005
- Position: Guard
- Number: 10

Career history
- 1997: Long Beach Stingrays
- 1997–1998: Atlanta Glory
- 2000–2003: Los Angeles Sparks

Career highlights
- 2× WNBA champion (2001, 2002); First-team All-Pac-10 (1994)

Career WNBA statistics
- Points: 284 (2.3 ppg)
- Rebounds: 96 (0.8 rpg)
- Assists: 213 (1.7 apg)
- Stats at Basketball Reference

Nicky McCrimmon (born March 22, 1972) is an American former professional basketball player who was on the Los Angeles Sparks between 2000 and 2003. Before joining the Sparks, McCrimmon played basketball on the New Mexico Junior College and University of Southern California teams. During her varsity career, McCrimmon played at the 1993 NCAA Division I women's basketball tournament and the 1994 NCAA Division I women's basketball tournament with USC. After college, McCrimmon was on several teams in the American Basketball League from 1997 to 1998.

With the Sparks from 2000 to 2003, McCrimmon had 284 points during her 125 regular season games. In playoff games, McCrimmon won the 2001 WNBA Championship and 2002 WNBA Championship as a member of the Sparks. In 2005, McCrimmon ended her basketball career after being released from the Houston Comets on two separate occasions. Apart from basketball, McCrimmon worked in project management and also was a substitute teacher.

== Early life and education ==
McCrimmon was born in Manhattan, New York on March 22, 1972. Growing up, McCrimmon played basketball in Harlem and continued to play while in high school. From 1990 to 1992, McCrimmon was on the New Mexico Junior College women's basketball team. During her time at the junior college, McCrimmon had 988 points and became second for the most career points at NMJC. She was also named player of the year for the Western Junior College Athletic Conference in 1992.

After continuing her education with the University of Southern California in 1992, McCrimmon was on the USC Trojans women's basketball from 1992 to 1994. While on the team, McCrimmon and USC made it to the regional semifinals at the 1993 NCAA Division I women's basketball tournament and the regional finals at the 1994 NCAA Division I women's basketball tournament. Overall, McCrimmon led in assists for USC during the 1992 and 1993 seasons. Apart from basketball, McCrimmon studied communications and sociology during her time at USC.

== Career ==
In April 1997, McCrimmon joined the Long Beach Stingrays when the team became part of the American Basketball League. Later that year, McCrimmon was traded to the Atlanta Glory in November 1997. The following year, McCrimmon worked at an insurance company in Phoenix, Arizona as an intern while part of the Seattle Reign.

At the 2000 WNBA draft, McCrimmon was drafted by the Los Angeles Sparks during the fourth round. While playing for the Sparks between 2000 and 2003, McCrimmon had 284 points and 96 rebounds during 125 regular season games. At the WNBA playoffs, McCrimmon and the Sparks won the 2001 WNBA Championship and 2002 WNBA Championship. In 2003, McCrimmmon played in seven playoff games before her team was defeated by the Detroit Shock in the 2003 WNBA Finals.

In February 2004, McCrimmon joined the Houston Comets as a free agent. After appearing in a preseason game in May 2004, McCrimmon requested to be released from the Comets. In March 2005, McCrimmon returned to the Comets as a free agent. That year, McCrimmon was on the roster for the Comets' training camp before being cut from the team in May 2005. Apart from her playing career, McCrimmon co-established a basketball company called Play Mode in 2003. During the mid-2000s in Lancaster, California, McCrimmon worked in project management for a group home while also becoming a substitute teacher.

== Career statistics ==
Legend
GP	Games played	GS	Games started	MPG	Minutes per game	RPG	Rebounds per game
APG	Assists per game	SPG	Steals per game	BPG	Blocks per game	PPG	Points per game
TO	Turnovers per game	FG%	Field-goal percentage	3P%	3-point field-goal percentage	FT%	Free-throw percentage
**Bold**	Career best	°	League leader

=== College ===
Year	Team	GP	Points	FG%	3P%	FT%	RPG	APG	PPG
1992–93	USC	28	305	.446	.261	.688	2.9	4.3	10.9
1993–94	USC	26	285	.500	.143	.767	2.3	6.2	11.0
TOTAL		54	590	.470	.245	.723	2.6	5.2	10.9

=== Regular season ===
Year	Team	GP	GS	MPG	FG%	3P%	FT%	RPG	APG	SPG	BPG	TO	PPG
2000	Los Angeles	32	0	**15.3**	**.506**	**.485**	.500	**1.0**	2.0	**0.9**	**0.3**	1.5	**3.2**
2001^{†}	Los Angeles	28	0	12.5	.444	.417	.429	0.4	**2.3**	0.8	0.0	0.8	2.3
2002^{†}	Los Angeles	32	0	11.1	.408	.267	.636	0.7	1.7	0.7	0.1	0.8	1.6
2003	Los Angeles	**33**	**1**	9.1	.444	.417	**.875**	0.9	1.0	0.6	0.0	**0.5**	2.1
Career	4 years, 1 team	125	1	11.9	.456	.417	.600	0.8	1.7	0.7	0.1	0.9	2.3

=== Playoffs ===
Year	Team	GP	GS	MPG	FG%	3P%	FT%	RPG	APG	SPG	BPG	TO	PPG
2000	Los Angeles	4	0	**12.3**	.250	.250	.750	**1.8**	**2.5**	0.3	0.0	1.3	**2.5**
2001^{†}	Los Angeles	**7**	0	5.9	**.500**	**1.000**	.500	0.6	0.9	**0.7**	0.0	0.6	0.7
2002^{†}	Los Angeles	5	0	4.4	.429	.500	**1.000**	0.2	0.4	0.4	0.0	**0.2**	1.6
2003	Los Angeles	**7**	0	7.7	.222	.167	.000	0.6	1.0	0.3	0.0	0.6	1.3
Career	4 years, 1 team	23	0	7.2	.282	.308	.667	0.7	1.1	0.4	0.0	0.6	1.4

== Movies ==
McCrimmon played the girl in the basketball court scene with Charles Barkley in Space Jam in 1996.
