= Mwadi Mabika =

Congolese-American basketball player (born 1976)

Personal information
- Born: 27 July 1976 (age 50) Kinshasa, Zaire
- Listed height: 5 ft 11 in (1.80 m)
- Listed weight: 165 lb (75 kg)

Career information
- Playing career: 1991–2008
- Position: Guard / forward
- Number: 4

Career history
- 1991–1997: Tourbillon Kinshasa
- 1997–2007: Los Angeles Sparks
- 1998–1999: ASA Jerusalem (Israel)
- 1999–2000: Bnei Yehuda (Israel)
- 2008: Houston Comets

Career highlights
- 2× WNBA champion (2001, 2002); 2× WNBA All-Star (2000, 2002); All-WNBA First Team (2002)

Career statistics
- Points: 3,572 (10.5 ppg)
- Rebounds: 1,327 (3.9 rpg)
- Assists: 778 (2.3 apg)
- Stats at Basketball Reference

Mwadi Mabika (born July 27, 1976) is a Congolese-American former basketball player. She was an All-Star in the Women's National Basketball Association (WNBA).

== Career ==
=== National and club career in Zaire/DRC ===
Mabika represented Zaire at the 1996 Summer Olympics.

She won a silver medal with the Democratic Republic of the Congo at the 2003 All-Africa Games.

In December 2005, she again represent the DR Congo's women's national basketball team – known as Simba Ladies – at the 2005 FIBA Africa Championship for Women.

For six seasons prior to joining the WNBA, Mabika played for the Tourbillon club in Kinshasa.

=== WNBA ===
Mabika was brought to the United States by NBA star and fellow Zairean Dikembe Mutombo, who personally appealed to the government officials in Zaire for permission to bring her to the U.S.

She played for the Los Angeles Sparks during the WNBA's inaugural season in 1997. Her debut game was played on June 21, 1997, in a 57–67 loss to the New York Liberty where she recorded eight points, five rebounds, one assist and two steals. In her rookie season, Mabika played in 21 of the team's 28 games, averaging 6.0 points and 2.6 rebounds while the Sparks finished with a 14–14 record and missed the playoffs.

After her rookie year, Mabika would become the flagship starting guard for the Sparks for the next ten years. From 1998–2006, she started in 90% of the games she played for the Sparks (269 out of 298 games) and averaged 11.3 points, 4.1 rebounds and 2.5 assists while playing 27.8 minutes per game throughout that 10-year span. Mabika had the most successful years of her career from 2000 to 2002, being selected as an all-star in 2000 and 2002, and winning consecutive championships with the Sparks in 2001 and 2002.

After 11 seasons playing with the Sparks, Mabika signed a free agent contract with the Houston Comets on February 20, 2008. She expressed great interest in signing with the team, stating "I can't wait. I've played with the same team for 11 years and now to have a new opportunity with a new team is exciting. Starting from training camp, I want to offer my leadership experience and the mental toughness that I know teams need to be successful."

Her season with the Comets would coincidentally not only be Mabika's final season in the league, it would also be the Comets' final season as a franchise as the team ceased operations after the 2008 season. She played in 20 of the team's 34 games and averaged 4.6 points and 1.9 rebounds. The Comets finished the season 17–17 and missed the playoffs. Her final WNBA game ever was also the Comets' final game as a franchise. This game would be played on September 15, 2008, with the Comets defeating the Sacramento Monarchs 90–81.

== Personal life ==
Mabika studied biology and chemistry at the Massamba School in Kinshasa.

Mabika became a U.S. citizen in 2011. in 2011 she gave birth to a baby girl named Heliana.

== Career statistics ==
Legend
GP	Games played	GS	Games started	MPG	Minutes per game	RPG	Rebounds per game
APG	Assists per game	SPG	Steals per game	BPG	Blocks per game	PPG	Points per game
TO	Turnovers per game	FG%	Field-goal percentage	3P%	3-point field-goal percentage	FT%	Free-throw percentage
**Bold**	Career best	°	League leader

=== Regular season ===
Year	Team	GP	GS	MPG	FG%	3P%	FT%	RPG	APG	SPG	BPG	TO	PPG
1997	Los Angeles	21	1	15.5	.390	.184	.542	2.6	1.0	1.1	0.3	1.3	6.0
1998	Los Angeles	29	23	24.5	.339	.308	.698	4.4	1.5	1.0	0.3	1.3	8.2
1999	Los Angeles	32	28	29.3	.372	.281	.718	4.8	**3.5**	1.4	0.5	1.8	10.8
2000	Los Angeles	32	**32**	29.4	.388	.384	.820	**5.6**	3.1	**1.8**	**0.6**	1.6	12.3
2001^{†}	Los Angeles	28	24	29.6	.387	.382	.861	4.6	3.1	1.4	0.4	1.6	11.2
2002^{†}	Los Angeles	32	32	**32.8**	**.423**	.366	.839	5.2	2.9	1.2	0.3	1.9	**16.8**
2003	Los Angeles	32	30	32.6	.407	.264	.866	4.4	2.6	0.9	**0.6**	2.3	13.8
2004	Los Angeles	31	31	31.1	.415	**.404**	.824	3.9	2.4	1.2	0.1	1.6	14.4
2005	Los Angeles	17	14	21.6	.320	.224	.500	1.6	1.7	0.9	0.0	0.8	5.8
2006	Los Angeles	32	32	21.2	.377	.333	**.889**	2.0	1.5	0.6	0.2	1.2	8.5
2007	Los Angeles	**33**	23	23.1	.364	.310	.754	3.8	2.2	0.9	0.1	2.2	8.1
2008	Houston	20	11	16.4	.303	.274	.714	1.9	0.9	0.5	0.0	**0.6**	4.6
Career	12 years, 2 teams	339	281	26.3	.385	.327	.799	3.9	2.3	1.1	0.2	1.6	10.5

=== Playoffs ===
Year	Team	GP	GS	MPG	FG%	3P%	FT%	RPG	APG	SPG	BPG	TO	PPG
1999	Los Angeles	4	4	31.8	.378	.176	.000	4.5	2.8	**3.3**	0.3	2.5	9.3
2000	Los Angeles	4	4	34.0	**.543**	**.531**	.750	5.3	1.0	1.5	**1.0**	**1.3**	17.5
2001^{†}	Los Angeles	7	7	33.0	.318	.250	.786	6.6	2.4	1.0	0.9	1.4	9.0
2002^{†}	Los Angeles	6	6	35.3	.378	.320	.692	**6.8**	**4.2**	1.3	0.2	1.7	14.7
2003	Los Angeles	**9**	**9**	**38.2**	.438	.353	.846	5.6	2.3	1.6	0.2	2.2	14.3
2004	Los Angeles	3	3	35.7	.370	.350	**.938**	2.7	3.3	2.3	0.0	2.0	**18.7**
2005	Los Angeles	1	1	11.0	.250	.000	.000	0.0	0.0	0.0	0.0	2.0	2.0
2006	Los Angeles	5	4	28.0	.388	.433	.706	4.0	2.0	1.4	0.0	1.6	15.4
Career	8 years, 1 team	39	38	33.5	.400	.350	.769	5.2	2.5	1.6	0.4	1.8	13.4
