= Gergana Slavcheva =

Bulgarian basketball player (born 1979)

Personal information
- Born: 20 October 1979 (age 47) Sofia, Bulgaria
- Listed height: 1.88 m (6 ft 2 in)

Career information
- College: FIU (1998–2002)
- WNBA draft: 2002: 2nd round, 30th overall pick
- Drafted by: Phoenix Mercury
- Playing career: 1998–2013
- Position: Small forward

Career history
- 2003: Phoenix Mercury
- 2003–2005: Basket Spezia Club
- 2005–2006: AS Vicenza
- 2006–2007: Tarbes Gespe Bigorre
- 2007–2009: ASDG Comense 1872
- 2010–2011: Libertas Trogylos Basket
- 2011–2013: Basket Parma

Career highlights
- 3× All-Sun Belt (2000–2002)
- Stats at Basketball Reference

Gergana Slavcheva (Bulgarian: Гергана Славчева), married Simeonov (Bulgarian: Симеонов) (born 20 October 1979) is a Bulgarian former basketball player.
