= Wendi Willits =

American basketball player and coach (born 1978)

Personal information
- Born: 18 November 1978 (age 47) Chickasha, Oklahoma, U.S.
- Listed height: 5 ft 7 in (1.70 m)

Career information
- High school: Fort Cobb-Broxton (Fort Cobb, Oklahoma)
- College: Arkansas (1997–2001)
- WNBA draft: 2001: undrafted
- Drafted by: Los Angeles Sparks
- Playing career: 2001–2001
- Position: Guard

Career history
- 2001: Los Angeles Sparks

Career highlights
- WNBA champion (2001); WNIT champion (1999)
- Stats at Basketball Reference

Wendi Wells (née Willits; born November 18, 1978) is an American basketball coach and former player. Before coaching, Wells had 3,345 points while playing high school basketball in Fort Cobb, Oklahoma. With the Arkansas Razorbacks women's basketball team from 1997 to 2001, Wells had 1574 points and set an Arkansas career record with 316 three-pointers. As part of the Razorbacks, Wells and her team reached the final four during the 1998 NCAA Division I women's basketball tournament and won the 1999 Women's National Invitation Tournament. After joining the Los Angeles Sparks in 2001, Wells and the team won the 2001 WNBA Championship. As an assistant coach, Wells worked for the University of West Georgia and Shawnee High School in the early to late 2000s. She has been girls basketball high school head coach in Shawnee, Oklahoma since 2008.

== Early life and education ==
Wendi Willits was born in Chickasha, Oklahoma on November 18, 1978. During her childhood, she started playing basketball as a toddler and grew up in Fort Cobb, Oklahoma. At Fort Cobb-Broxton, she played in 128 girls basketball games and scored 3,345 points. During her final year in high school, Wells was named player of the year by The Oklahoman in 1997. For her post-secondary education, she went to the University of Arkansas to study exercise physiology.

== College career ==
While at Arkansas from 1997 to 2001, Wells played on the Arkansas Razorbacks women's basketball team. In college tournaments, she and the Razorbacks made it to the final four at the 1998 NCAA Division I women's basketball tournament and won the 1999 Women's National Invitation Tournament. During her 131 games with the Razorbacks, she had 1574 points overall. Leading up to the 2020-2021 season, Wells was seventh in all-time career points for Arkansas. With 316 three-pointers, she has held the Arkansas career record for almost twenty years. She also received the Ed Steitz Award in 1999 for having the highest three point percentage in NCAA Division I schools.

== Professional career ==
In 2001, Wells started her WNBA career when she joined the Los Angeles Sparks. During her only season with the Sparks, she played in thirteen regular season games and had seventeen points. That season, she played in four playoffs games and scored zero points. Of her playoff games, Wells played in the 2001 WNBA Championship where she and the Sparks defeated the Charlotte Sting. After being let go by the Sparks, she moved to Florida for employment.

== Coaching career ==
After leaving the WNBA, Wells started her assistant coaching tenure with the University of West Georgia in 2003. After leaving for Shawnee High School in 2006, she continued her assistant coaching tenure until 2008. In December 2008, Wells became the girls basketball head coach at Shawnee. During her head coach tenure, Wells won her hundredth game in 2013. Leading up to the 2020-2021 season, Wells had 194 wins and 50 losses with Shawnee.

== Career statistics ==
Legend
GP	Games played	GS	Games started	MPG	Minutes per game	RPG	Rebounds per game
APG	Assists per game	SPG	Steals per game	BPG	Blocks per game	PPG	Points per game
TO	Turnovers per game	FG%	Field-goal percentage	3P%	3-point field-goal percentage	FT%	Free-throw percentage
**Bold**	Career best	°	League leader

†	Denotes season in which Willits won a WNBA championship

=== WNBA ===
==== Regular season ====
WNBA regular season statistics
Year	Team	GP	GS	MPG	FG%	3P%	FT%	RPG	APG	SPG	BPG	TO	PPG
2001 †	Los Angeles	13	0	3.6	.300	.154	.750	0.4	0.2	0.1	0.0	0.2	1.3
**Career**	1 year, 1 team	13	0	3.6	.300	.154	.750	0.4	0.2	0.1	0.0	0.2	1.3

==== Playoffs ====
WNBA playoff statistics
Year	Team	GP	GS	MPG	FG%	3P%	FT%	RPG	APG	SPG	BPG	TO	PPG
2001†	Los Angeles	4	0	2.3	.000	.000	—	0.3	0.3	0.0	0.0	0.3	0.0
**Career**	1 year, 1 team	4	0	2.3	.000	.000	—	0.3	0.3	0.0	0.0	0.3	0.0

=== College ===
NCAA statistics
Year	Team	GP	GS	Min	MPG	Points	PPG	RBS	RPG	FG%	3P%	FT%	APG	SPG	BPG
1997–98	Arkansas	33	5	622	18.8	223	6.8	66	2.0	34.3%	35.6%	76.7%	1.2	0.7	0.0
1998–99	Arkansas	33	**32**	1001	30.3	**470**	**14.2**	**110**	**3.3**	**46.0%**	**46.0%**	80.5%	1.6	0.8	0.2
1999–00	Arkansas	32	30	**1108**	**34.6**	451	14.1	96	3.0	40.3%	39.7%	**85.1%**	**2.3**	0.7	**0.3**
2000–01	Arkansas	33	30	1056	32	430	13	101	3.1	37.9%	40.5%	83.3%	1.8	**0.9**	0.2
**Career**		131	97	3787	39	1574	12	373	2.8	40.1%	41.0%	81.8%	1.7	0.8	0.2

== Personal life ==
Wells is married and has one child.
