= Latasha Byears =

American basketball player (born 1973)

Personal information
- Born: August 12, 1973 (age 53) Memphis, Tennessee, U.S.
- Listed height: 5 ft 11 in (1.80 m)
- Listed weight: 206 lb (93 kg)

Career information
- High school: Bolton (Arlington, Tennessee)
- College: Northeastern Oklahoma A&M College (1992–1994); DePaul (1994–1996)
- WNBA draft: 1997: undrafted
- Playing career: 1997–2011
- Position: Power forward

Career history
- 1997–2000: Sacramento Monarchs
- 1998–99: Sporting Athens
- 2001–2003: Los Angeles Sparks
- 2001: MiZo-Pécsi VSK
- 2003–05: Ceyhan Belediyespor
- 2005: Dynamo Energia Novosibirsk
- 2005–06: TED Kayseri Koleji
- 2006: Washington Mystics
- 2006–07: CSKA Sofia
- 2007–2008: Houston Comets
- 2008–09: Duda Leszno
- 2009–10: Beroe Stara Zagora
- 2010–11: Dunav 8806

Career highlights
- 2× WNBA champion (2001, 2002); Greek Champion (1999); Greek Cup winner (1999); Bulgarian Champion (2007); 2× Bulgarian Cup winner (2007, 2011); First-team All-American – AP (1996); Second-team All-American – AP (1995); First-team All-CUSA (1996)

Career WNBA statistics
- Points: 1,935 (7.7 ppg)
- Rebounds: 1,204 (4.8 rpg)
- Assists: 200 (0.8 apg)
- Stats at WNBA.com
- Stats at Basketball Reference

Latasha Nashay Byears (born August 12, 1973) is an American former professional basketball player. She played in the Women's National Basketball Association (WNBA) for the Sacramento Monarchs, Los Angeles Sparks, Washington Mystics, and Houston Comets. Byears ranked eighth all-time in the WNBA in field goal percentage (.514) and was among the top 10 rebounders in the league's history as of 2003.

Nicknamed "Tot", Byears usually played the position of power forward. However, the openly lesbian Byers became associated with legal controversy outside of her basketball career.

== College career ==
Born in Memphis, Tennessee, Byears grew up in Millington, Tennessee and went to high school in nearby Arlington, Tennessee. Afterwards, Byears played two years in Northeastern Oklahoma A&M, located in Miami, Oklahoma. She later transferred to DePaul University in Chicago, where she averaged 22.8 points and 11.7 rebounds per game during the 1995–1996 season, a performance that earned her a first team All-American. On 23 January 2011 Byears inducted to DePaul Athletic Hall of Fame.

== WNBA career ==
Despite not being selected at the first WNBA draft, the Sacramento Monarchs invited Byears to their training camp prior to their inaugural season in 1997. Byears then starred for the Monarchs for the next four seasons.

After the 2000 season ended, Byears was traded to the Los Angeles Sparks, where she was a crucial part of a championship win for the team. She was arrested on March 1, 2001 for driving under the influence of marijuana. Because of this, she had to miss the first match of the 2001 regular season due to a suspension. On July 11, 2002, she fought Michelle M. Marciniak on the court in a game against the Seattle Storm. On July 12, 2002, the WNBA fined her $1,000 and banned her for 2 matches. However, following a June 5, 2003 Sparks game, Byears and three men unconnected to the Sparks were investigated for an alleged rape of a WNBA player. Byears was cut by the Sparks a few days after the alleged incident. Four months later, in light of Kobe Bryant's rape allegations and how the Los Angeles Lakers, who owned the Sparks at the time, supported Bryant during the controversy. Byears sued the Lakers, accusing the team of double standard. Byears felt that it was unfair that she was never charged and was cut; Bryant's case was settled, yet he still continued to play and represent the team in media. The criminal proceedings were closed in August 2005 due to insufficient evidence, and Byears' lawsuit against the Lakers was settled months later. Shortly after settling the lawsuit, Byears returned to the WNBA after a two-year absence, signing with the Mystics.

In 2007, Byears signed a free agent contract with the Houston Comets. She was briefly waived in 2008, before being re-signed. The Comets organization folded at the end of the 2008 season. Byears, as an unrestricted free agent, was not eligible for selection by another team in the resulting dispersal draft, and was not signed by another team prior to or during the 2009 season.

== Overseas career ==
In October 2001 Byears joined the EuroLeague final four participant and Hungarian National League champion MiZo-Pécsi VSK. She played only two matches, on 15 November 2001 travel back the United States.

In November 2006 Byears joined the Bulgarian team of CSKA Sofia. They won the Bulgarian Championships and Bulgarian Cup.

Byears played for Leszno in Poland during the 2008–09 WNBA off-season.

== Career statistics ==
Legend
GP	Games played	GS	Games started	MPG	Minutes per game	RPG	Rebounds per game
APG	Assists per game	SPG	Steals per game	BPG	Blocks per game	PPG	Points per game
TO	Turnovers per game	FG%	Field-goal percentage	3P%	3-point field-goal percentage	FT%	Free-throw percentage
**Bold**	Career best	°	League leader

=== WNBA ===
==== Regular season ====
Year	Team	GP	GS	MPG	FG%	3P%	FT%	RPG	APG	SPG	BPG	TO	PPG
1997	Sacramento	28	19	23.4	.459	.200	.739	**6.9**	**1.7**	**1.4**	0.3	2.4	8.7
1998	Sacramento	30	26	**27.6**	.453	.222	.663	6.6	1.0	**1.4**	**0.4**	2.4	**14.2**
1999	Sacramento	**32**	**32**	22.0	.537	.000	.565	5.3	1.0	1.1	0.2	1.9	9.2
2000	Sacramento	**32**	0	16.3	.524	**.500**	.612	3.8	0.7	0.9	0.2	1.1	5.7
2001^{†}	Los Angeles	**32**	13	23.1	.602°	.333	.577	5.7	0.9	1.3	**0.4**	1.2	9.3
2002^{†}	Los Angeles	26	5	18.7	**.618**	.000	.566	5.4	0.5	0.7	0.2	0.8	7.0
2003	Los Angeles	5	0	14.4	.400	.000	.727	4.2	0.4	0.0	**0.4**	0.4	5.6
2006	Washington	26	0	12.8	.449	.000	**.800**	3.3	0.4	0.5	0.1	1.4	4.3
2007	Houston	30	0	10.9	.591	.000	.583	2.5	0.5	0.8	0.2	1.2	5.0
2008	Houston	11	0	4.2	.471	.000	.667	1.1	0.1	0.3	0.0	**0.1**	1.6
Career	10 years, 4 teams	252	95	18.7	.515	.233	.635	4.8	0.8	1.0	0.2	1.5	7.7

==== Playoffs ====
Year	Team	GP	GS	MPG	FG%	3P%	FT%	RPG	APG	SPG	BPG	TO	PPG
1999	Sacramento	1	1	**24.0**	.000	.000	.500	**10.0**	0.0	1.0	0.0	3.0	1.0
2000	Sacramento	2	0	6.0	.000	.000	.000	1.0	0.0	0.5	0.0	**0.0**	0.0
2001^{†}	Los Angeles	**7**	0	14.6	.500	.000	**.643**	4.0	0.3	0.4	**0.6**	0.7	6.4
2002^{†}	Los Angeles	6	**2**	21.3	**.633**	.000	.364	4.8	**0.8**	**1.5**	0.2	1.7	**7.0**
Career	4 years, 2 teams	16	3	16.6	.521	.000	.519	4.3	0.4	0.9	0.3	1.1	5.5

=== College ===
Year	Team	GP	GS	MPG	FG%	3P%	FT%	RPG	APG	SPG	BPG	TO	PPG
1994–95	DePaul	28	-	-	**59.3**	**40.7**	**74.6**	10.4	1.5	2.4	0.7	-	**26.4**
1995–96	DePaul	**30**	-	-	53.0	11.1	66.5	**11.7**	**1.8**	**3.0**	0.7	-	22.8
**Career**		58	-	-	56.2	28.9	69.9	11.1	1.7	2.7	0.7	-	24.5
Statistics retrieved from Sports-Reference.
