= Nicole Levandusky =

American basketball player and coach (born 1979)

Personal information
- Born: May 17, 1979 (age 47)

Career information
- College: Xavier
- WNBA draft: 2001: 2nd round, 32nd overall pick
- Drafted by: Los Angeles Sparks
- Position: Guard

Career history
- 2001: Los Angeles Sparks

Career highlights
- WNBA champion (2001); Atlantic 10's Defensive Player of the Year (2001)
- Stats at Basketball Reference

Nicole Levandusky (born May 17, 1979) is a former professional basketball player for the Los Angeles Sparks of the Women's National Basketball Association. She then served as coach of Notre Dame Academy.

== Career statistics ==
Legend
GP	Games played	GS	Games started	MPG	Minutes per game	RPG	Rebounds per game
APG	Assists per game	SPG	Steals per game	BPG	Blocks per game	PPG	Points per game
TO	Turnovers per game	FG%	Field-goal percentage	3P%	3-point field-goal percentage	FT%	Free-throw percentage
**Bold**	Career best	°	League leader

†	Denotes season(s) in which Levandusky won a WNBA championship

=== WNBA ===
==== Regular season ====
WNBA regular season statistics
Year	Team	GP	GS	MPG	FG%	3P%	FT%	RPG	APG	SPG	BPG	TO	PPG
2001^{†}	Los Angeles	13	0	5.2	.318	.294	1.000	0.7	0.5	0.4	0.1	0.4	1.5
**Career**	1 year, 1 team	13	0	5.2	.318	.294	1.000	0.7	0.5	0.4	0.1	0.4	1.5

==== Playoffs ====
WNBA playoff statistics
Year	Team	GP	GS	MPG	FG%	3P%	FT%	RPG	APG	SPG	BPG	TO	PPG
2001^{†}	Los Angeles	3	0	1.7	.000	.000	—	0.0	0.0	0.0	0.0	0.0	0.0
**Career**	1 year, 1 team	3	0	1.7	.000	.000	—	0.0	0.0	0.0	0.0	0.0	0.0

=== College ===
Ratios
Year	Team	GP	FG%	3P%	FT%	RBG	APG	BPG	SPG	PPG
1997-98	Xavier	29	38.7%	26.9%	58.8%	2.76	1.55	**0.28**	2.79	9.86
1998-99	Xavier	33	43.5%	**42.9%**	74.4%	4.50	2.18	0.12	2.58	**15.80**
1999-00	Xavier	31	42.3%	38.5%	71.6%	5.07	2.55	0.13	**3.23**	13.48
2000-01	Xavier	**34**	**44.6%**	41.2%	**78.8%**	**5.20**	**2.80**	0.20	3.20	15.60
Career		127	42.6%	38.6%	71.8%	4.45	2.28	0.17	2.96	13.82

Totals
Year	Team	GP	FG	FGA	3P	3PA	FT	FTA	REB	A	BK	ST	PTS
1997-98	Xavier	29	105	271	36	134	40	68	80	45	**8**	81	286
1998-99	Xavier	33	**183**	**421**	94	219	61	82	150	72	4	85	521
1999-00	Xavier	31	148	350	74	192	48	67	157	79	4	100	418
2000-01	Xavier	**34**	176	395	**100**	**243**	**78**	**99**	**178**	**94**	6	**110**	**530**
Career		127	612	1437	304	788	227	316	565	290	22	376	1755

== Honors and awards ==
=== High school ===
- Palmerton Area High School (1993-1997) scored 2,662 career points

=== College ===
- Atlantic 10's Defensive Player of the Year (2001)
- 2x First-team all-conference selection

=== WNBA ===
- 2001 WNBA champion
