= Tamecka Dixon =

American basketball player (born 1975)

Personal information
- Born: December 14, 1975 (age 50) Linden, New Jersey, U.S.
- Listed height: 5 ft 9 in (1.75 m)
- Listed weight: 148 lb (67 kg)

Career information
- High school: Linden (Linden, New Jersey)
- College: Kansas (1993–1997)
- WNBA draft: 1997: 2nd round, 14th overall pick
- Drafted by: Los Angeles Sparks
- Playing career: 1997–2009
- Position: Shooting guard
- Number: 21, 20

Career history
- 1997–2005: Los Angeles Sparks
- 2006–2008: Houston Comets
- 2009: Indiana Fever

Career highlights
- 3× WNBA All-Star (2001–2003); 2× WNBA champion (2001, 2002); All-WNBA Second Team (2001); All-American – USBWA, Kodak(1997); Second-team All-American – AP (1997); Big 12 Player of the Year (1997); Big 8 Player of the Year (1996); First-team All-Big 12 (1997); First-team All-Big 8 (1996)
- Stats at WNBA.com
- Stats at Basketball Reference
Medals
Women's basketball
Representing USA
FIBA World Championship for Women
Gold medal – first place	2002 Nanjing	Team competition

Tamecka Michelle Dixon (born December 14, 1975) is an American former professional basketball player. She played in the Women's National Basketball Association (WNBA) from 1997 to 2009 for three different teams, was part of WNBA championship teams in 2001 and 2002, was a three-time WNBA All-Star and announced her retirement prior to the 2010 WNBA season.

== Early life ==
Dixon attended Linden High School in Linden, New Jersey, where she was named a High School All-American by the WBCA. She participated in the WBCA High School All-America Game in 1993, scoring ten points.

== College career ==
For the Kansas Jayhawks women's basketball team, Dixon averaged 14.2 points, 4.5 rebounds, 2.8 assists, and 1.8 steals in 119 career games. She was named Big 12 Player of the Year and was also named to the 1996–97 Kodak All-American Team.

=== Kansas statistics ===
Legend
GP	Games played	GS	Games started	MPG	Minutes per game
FG%	Field goal percentage	3P%	3-point field goal percentage	FT%	Free throw percentage
RPG	Rebounds per game	APG	Assists per game	SPG	Steals per game
BPG	Blocks per game	PPG	Points per game	**Bold**	Career high

Year	Team	GP	Points	FG%	3P%	FT%	RPG	APG	SPG	BPG	PPG
1993–94	Kansas	27	184	42.0%	18.8%	52.0%	4.2	1.6	1.0	0.3	6.8
1994–95	Kansas	30	338	**47.5%**	**35.7%**	64.0%	4.0	2.7	1.4	**0.9**	11.3
1995–96	Kansas	**32**	543	46.9%	20.0%	**77.4%**	4.2	3.2	1.9	0.3	17.0
1996–97	Kansas	30	**624**	45.0%	34.5%	74.1%	**5.6**	**3.7**	**2.6**	0.6	**20.8**
Career		119	1689	45.7%	28.8%	70.0%	4.5	2.8	1.8	0.5	14.2

== USA Basketball ==
In 2002, Dixon was named to the national team which competed in the World Championships in Zhangjiagang, Changzhou and Nanjing, China. The team was coached by Van Chancellor. Dixon scored 3.4 points per game. The USA team won all nine games, including a close title game against Russia, which was a one-point game late in the game.

== WNBA career ==
Dixon was selected in the first round of the 1997 WNBA draft (14th overall) by the Los Angeles Sparks. Her debut game was played on June 21, 1997, in a 57–67 loss to the New York Liberty where she recorded 2 points and 2 assists.

Dixon played for the Sparks for nine seasons (1997–2005), was selected as an all-star for three consecutive seasons (2001–2003), and won a WNBA championship with the team in two back-to-back seasons (2001 and 2002). Before the start of the 2006 season, Dixon would sign with the Houston Comets on February 28, 2006. The 2006 season is the only season that Dixon made the playoffs with the Comets, but they were swept in the first round by the Sacramento Monarchs.

She was waived by the Comets on January 11, 2007 but was re-signed a month into the 2007 season on July 4.

The Comets missed the playoffs in 2007 and 2008, finishing with a 13–21 and 17–17 record respectively. The Comets would also cease operations at the end of the 2008 season and a dispersal draft would be held in December 2008 to send all of the Houston Comets players to different teams. Unfortunately, Dixon (along with teammate Shannon Johnson) were the only Comets players that were eligible to be selected in the dispersal draft that were not chosen. The both of them thus became free agents and Johnson signed with the Seattle Storm while Dixon signed with the Indiana Fever.

This 2009 season with the Fever ended up being Dixon's final year in the league. The Fever defeated the Washington Mystics and the Detroit Shock en route to the WNBA Finals (the 4th Finals appearance in Dixon's career). They battled the Phoenix Mercury in a grueling Finals series, even taking a 2–1 lead after game 3. Unfortunately the Fever would fall to the Mercury in games 4 and 5, thus losing the opportunity to win the title that year. Game 5 of the Finals series which was played on October 9, 2009, was Dixon's final WNBA game ever. The Fever lost the game 86–94 with Dixon recording 2 rebounds.

After a 12-year career, Dixon announced her retirement on February 18, 2010. At the time of her retirement, Dixon was one of the four remaining players from the WNBA's inaugural season (along with Lisa Leslie, Tina Thompson and Vickie Johnson). Speaking on her retirement, Dixon stated "I always wanted to go out on my own terms. After the Houston franchise disbanded, I was at a crossroads because I thought I would finish my career there. I was contemplating retirement then, but I still felt I had a little left to give the game and wanted to go out on my own terms.....I fell a little short of my goal to help Indiana obtain the championship. So I definitely thought about coming back for 2010. It was hard to come so close and fall short, but I do think now is the right time for me. I have no regrets in making this decision now".

== Career statistics ==
Legend
GP	Games played	GS	Games started	MPG	Minutes per game	RPG	Rebounds per game
APG	Assists per game	SPG	Steals per game	BPG	Blocks per game	PPG	Points per game
TO	Turnovers per game	FG%	Field-goal percentage	3P%	3-point field-goal percentage	FT%	Free-throw percentage
**Bold**	Career best	°	League leader

=== Regular season ===
Year	Team	GP	GS	MPG	FG%	3P%	FT%	RPG	APG	SPG	BPG	TO	PPG
1997	Los Angeles	27	21	26.5	**.456**	.423	.773	3.0	2.0	**1.8**	0.2	2.1	11.9
1998	Los Angeles	22	22	32.3	.438	.356	.779	2.5	2.5	1.1	**0.4**	2.6	**16.2**
1999	Los Angeles	**32**	14	17.6	.387	.313	.738	2.1	1.7	0.5	0.1	1.2	6.8
2000	Los Angeles	31	**31**	28.5	.454	.353	.805	3.4	3.1	1.3	0.3	1.9	10.9
2001	Los Angeles	29	29	31.9	.417	.176	.791	2.9	3.9	0.9	0.1	2.5	11.7
2002	Los Angeles	30	30	31.9	.391	.351	.831	3.1	**4.0**	0.9	0.2	**2.7**	10.6
2003	Los Angeles	30	30	**34.7**	.437	.212	**.883**	**4.2**	3.0	1.2	0.3	2.3	13.7
2004	Los Angeles	**32**	21	28.5	.442	**.455**	.782	3.4	3.5	1.1	0.0	2.2	9.7
2005	Los Angeles	30	23	20.2	.409	.000	.850	2.2	2.6	0.8	0.1	1.3	5.3
2006	Houston	21	14	25.7	.404	.111	.821	2.6	2.3	0.6	0.1	2.5	7.0
2007	Houston	18	0	27.2	.439	.294	.861	3.2	3.2	1.3	0.3	2.1	12.0
2008	Houston	24	20	26.4	.403	.154	.857	3.2	1.8	1.0	0.1	2.0	9.0
2009	Indiana	32	1	13.3	.410	.400	.857	1.6	1.2	0.4	0.1	0.8	4.1
Career	13 years, 3 teams	360	256	26.3	.424	.309	.809	2.9	2.7	1.0	0.1	2.0	9.7

=== Playoffs ===
Year	Team	GP	GS	MPG	FG%	3P%	FT%	RPG	APG	SPG	BPG	TO	PPG
1999	Los Angeles	4	0	10.5	.350	.000	**1.000**	2.0	1.3	0.8	0.0	1.3	3.8
2000	Los Angeles	4	4	31.8	.370	**.500**	.889	2.8	4.0	0.8	0.0	2.0	11.8
2001	Los Angeles	7	7	**36.1**	.482	.462	.818	2.4	**4.1**	1.3	**0.3**	2.9	**13.6**
2002	Los Angeles	5	4	29.4	**.568**	.500	.900	4.0	3.4	**2.4**	0.0	2.6	12.2
2003	Los Angeles	9	**9**	35.1	.426	.333	.963	3.2	3.2	1.6	0.2	1.2	12.2
2004	Los Angeles	3	3	33.3	.400	.000	.875	**5.7**	3.0	0.7	0.0	**3.3**	10.3
2005	Los Angeles	2	1	6.0	.500	.000	.000	0.5	1.0	0.5	0.0	0.5	1.0
2006	Houston	2	0	22.0	.364	.000	.750	4.0	2.5	0.0	0.0	2.0	5.5
2009	Indiana	**10**	0	6.2	.346	.000	.600	0.7	0.2	0.1	0.0	0.5	2.1
Career	9 years, 3 teams	46	28	24.0	.435	.405	.880	2.6	2.5	1.0	0.1	1.7	8.5

== Personal life ==
Dixon has been a resident of Westfield, New Jersey.
