= Ukari Figgs =

American basketball player (born 1977)

Personal information
- Born: March 31, 1977 (age 48) Georgetown, Kentucky, U.S.
- Listed height: 5 ft 9 in (1.75 m)

Career information
- High school: Scott County (Georgetown, Kentucky)
- College: Purdue (1995–1999)
- WNBA draft: 1999: 3rd round, 28th overall pick
- Drafted by: Los Angeles Sparks
- Position: Point guard
- Number: 5

Career history
- 1999–2001: Los Angeles Sparks
- 2002: Portland Fire
- 2003: Houston Comets

Career highlights
- NCAA champion (1999); NCAA Tournament MOP (1999); First-team All-Big Ten (1999); Kentucky Miss Basketball (1995)
- Stats at Basketball Reference

Ukari Okien Figgs (born March 31, 1977) is an American former collegiate and professional women's basketball player.

== Early life and college ==
Born in Georgetown, Kentucky, Figgs led the Scott County girls' basketball team to a state title in 1995, and she was named Kentucky's Miss Basketball.

Figgs then went to school on a scholarship, starring on the women's basketball team at Purdue University, averaging 11.6 points and 3.3 assists in her four-year career. In her senior season, Figgs averaged 16.3 points, 4.5 rebounds and 4.2 assists. Purdue handily won the NCAA Championship that year (winning all of its tournament games by a margin of at least 10 points) and Figgs was named Most Outstanding Player of the 1999 NCAA Final Four. Figgs' other accomplishments while at Purdue included making the 1999 All-Big Ten team and the 1998 and 1999 NCAA Regional All-Tournament Teams and winning the 1997 Best Defensive Player award. Figgs graduated from Purdue in 1999 with a degree in mechanical engineering, taking full advantage of her scholarship.

=== Purdue statistics ===
Legend
GP	Games played	GS	Games started	MPG	Minutes per game
FG%	Field goal percentage	3P%	3-point field goal percentage	FT%	Free throw percentage
RPG	Rebounds per game	APG	Assists per game	SPG	Steals per game
BPG	Blocks per game	PPG	Points per game	**Bold**	Career high

Year	Team	GP	Points	FG%	3P%	FT%	RPG	APG	SPG	BPG	PPG
1995–96	Purdue	30	117	37.0%	29.8%	80.0%	2.3	1.9	0.8	0.2	3.9
1996–97	Purdue	27	258	33.9%	34.4%	76.1%	3.5	3.1	1.0	0.1	9.6
1997–98	Purdue	33	510	**43.5%**	**36.4%**	85.9%	**5.1**	3.7	**1.8**	**0.4**	15.5
1998–99	Purdue	**35**	**570**	39.7%	34.2%	**86.3%**	4.5	**4.2**	1.7	0.2	**16.3**
Career	Purdue	125	1455	39.4%	34.4%	84.1%	3.9	3.3	1.4	0.2	11.6

== WNBA career ==
Figgs was selected by the Los Angeles Sparks in the third round (28th overall) of the 1999 WNBA draft, and played for the Sparks for three seasons, which included a WNBA Championship in 2001. Figgs then played one season each for the Portland Fire and Houston Comets.

Prior to the start of the 2004 season, Figgs retired from the WNBA; she had averaged 6.5 points, 3.1 assists, 2.3 rebounds, and had played in 15 games on three different teams.

== WNBA career statistics ==
Legend
GP	Games played	GS	Games started	MPG	Minutes per game	RPG	Rebounds per game
APG	Assists per game	SPG	Steals per game	BPG	Blocks per game	PPG	Points per game
TO	Turnovers per game	FG%	Field-goal percentage	3P%	3-point field-goal percentage	FT%	Free-throw percentage
**Bold**	Career best	°	League leader

=== Regular season ===
Year	Team	GP	GS	MPG	FG%	3P%	FT%	RPG	APG	SPG	BPG	TO	PPG
1999	Los Angeles	22	10	15.0	36.6	29.8	87.5	1.6	1.5	0.7	0.0	1.4	4.3
2000	Los Angeles	32	**32**	25.1	**43.1**	35.4	83.1	1.7	**4.0**	0.7	**0.1**	**1.3**	6.7
2001	Los Angeles	32	29	**29.1**	42.5	**46.2**	81.0	**3.1**	3.9	**1.3**	**0.1**	1.7	8.0
2002	Portland	31	31	27.9	35.8	32.5	**90.8**	2.6	3.4	0.8	**0.1**	1.4	**8.5**
2003	Houston	**34**	30	28.0	41.9	37.7	86.4	2.4	2.4	0.8	0.0	1.7	4.4
Career	5 years, 3 teams	151	132	25.7	39.9	37.2	85.4	2.3	3.1	0.9	**0.1**	1.5	6.5

=== Playoffs ===
Year	Team	GP	GS	MPG	FG%	3P%	FT%	RPG	APG	SPG	BPG	TO	PPG
1999	Los Angeles	1	0	4.0	0.0	0.0	0.0	1.0	0.0	0.0	0.0	0.0	**0.0**
2000	Los Angeles	4	4	26.5	30.4	36.4	**100.0**	**4.0**	4.8	0.5	0.0	2.8	6.0
2001	Los Angeles	**7**	**7**	**34.1**	34.0	27.8	75.0	2.1	**5.9**	**0.6**	**0.6**	0.9	**8.3**
2003	Houston	3	3	27.0	**40.0**	**71.4**	0.0	2.0	2.3	0.3	0.0	1.0	5.7
Career	4 years, 2 teams	15	14	28.7	33.7	34.5	81.8	2.5	4.5	0.5	0.3	1.3	6.6

== Life after the WNBA ==
Figgs worked as a production engineer at Toyota Motor Manufacturing Kentucky in her hometown of Georgetown, Kentucky, and as an assistant coach with the boys' varsity basketball team at Scott County High School. Figgs was appointed as an assistant coach to Purdue University's women's basketball team on April 13, 2009. On June 6, 2011, it was announced Figgs would become an assistant athletics director for women's basketball at the University of Kentucky.

On November 1, 2013, Figgs announced that she was leaving UK to return to Toyota in Georgetown as an engineer. She cited the need to spend more time with her family as the reason for this move.
