= Vedrana Grgin-Fonseca =

Croatian basketball player (born 1975)

Personal information
- Born: 13 January 1975 (age 51) Split, SFR Yugoslavia
- Listed height: 1.90 m (6 ft 3 in)

Career information
- WNBA draft: 1997: undrafted
- Playing career: 1990–2010
- Position: Small forward

Career history
- 1990–1994: Split
- 1994–1995: Cesena
- 1995–1996: ASDG Comense 1872
- 1996–1997: AO Sporting Athènes
- 1997–1998: Fluminense
- 1998–2000: Parana
- 2000: Los Angeles Sparks
- 2000-2001: Lotos Gdynia
- 2001: Los Angeles Sparks
- 2001–2002: UB-Barça
- 2002: ESB Villeneuve-d'Ascq
- 2002: Los Angeles Sparks
- 2002–2004: CJM Bourges Basket
- 2004–2005: ESB Villeneuve-d'Ascq
- 2005–2007: Valenciennes
- 2007–2008: Spartak Moscow
- 2008–2009: Saint-Amand Hainaut Basket
- 2009: Split
- 2010: Athlete Celje
- Stats at Basketball Reference
Medals
Women's basketball
Representing Croatia
Mediterranean Games
Gold medal – first place	1997 Bari	Team

Vedrana Grgin-Fonseca (born 13 January 1975 in Split, SFR Yugoslavia) is a Croatian female former basketball player.
