= DeLisha Milton-Jones =

American basketball player (born 1974)

Delisha Milton-Jones
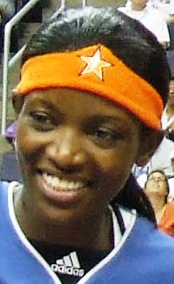
- Milton-Jones at the 2007 WNBA All-Star Game

Old Dominion Monarchs
- Title: Head coach
- League: Sun Belt Conference

Personal information
- Born: September 11, 1974 (age 52) Riceboro, Georgia, U.S.
- Listed height: 6 ft 1 in (1.85 m)
- Listed weight: 185 lb (84 kg)

Career information
- High school: Bradwell Institute (Hinesville, Georgia)
- College: Florida (1993–1997)
- WNBA draft: 1999: Supplemental round, 4th overall pick
- Drafted by: Los Angeles Sparks
- Playing career: 1999–2015
- Position: Small forward / power forward
- Number: 8, 3, 1
- Coaching career: 2016–present

Career history

Playing
- 1997–1998: Portland Power
- 1999–2004: Los Angeles Sparks
- 2002–2003: UMMC Ekaterinburg
- 2005–2007: Washington Mystics
- 2005–2006: Gambrinus Brno
- 2006–2008: Ros Casares Valencia
- 2008–2009: Ros Casares Valencia
- 2008–2012: Los Angeles Sparks
- 2013: San Antonio Silver Stars
- 2013–2014: New York Liberty
- 2014–2015: Atlanta Dream

Coaching
- 2016–2017: Pepperdine (assistant)
- 2017–2019: Pepperdine
- 2019–2020: Syracuse (assistant)
- 2020–present: Old Dominion

Career highlights
- As player: 2× WNBA champion (2001, 2002); 3× WNBA All-Star (2000, 2004, 2007); Kim Perrot Sportsmanship Award (2015); No. 8 retired by Los Angeles Sparks; Wade Trophy (1997); Honda Sports Award for basketball (1997); Kodak All-American (1997); First-team All-American – AP (1997); SEC Player of the Year (1997); 2× First-team All-SEC (1996, 1997); SEC All-Freshman Team (1994)

Career statistics
- Field goals completed: .440
- Free throws completed: .790
- Points scored: 5,571
- Stats at WNBA.com
- Stats at Basketball Reference
- Women's Basketball Hall of Fame
Medals
Women's basketball
Representing the United States
Olympic Games
Gold medal – first place	2000 Sydney	Team competition
Gold medal – first place	2008 Beijing	Team competition
FIBA World Championship
Gold medal – first place	1998 Germany	Team competition
Gold medal – first place	2002 China	Team competition
Bronze medal – third place	2006 Brazil	Team competition
Universiade
Gold medal – first place	1997 Sicily	Team competition

DeLisha Lachell Milton-Jones (born September 11, 1974) is an American former professional basketball player and the head coach of Old Dominion. Milton-Jones played college basketball for the University of Florida. She was a first-team All-American and SEC Player of the Year her senior season.

Milton-Jones began her professional career in 1997 with the Portland Power, who drafted her second overall in the American Basketball League (ABL). After the dissolution of the ABL in 1998, Milton-Jones entered into the 1999 WNBA draft and was selected fourth overall by the Los Angeles Sparks. In her 17-season WNBA career, she played for the Los Angeles Sparks (1999–2004, 2008–2012), Washington Mystics (2005–07), San Antonio Stars (2013), and New York Liberty (2013–14).

Milton-Jones is a two-time Olympic gold medalist (2000, 2008) and a two-time WNBA champion (2001, 2002) and has been selected to the WNBA All-Star Game three times (2000, 2004, 2007).

== Early life ==
Milton-Jones was born DeLisha Lachell Milton in Riceboro, Georgia, in 1974. She attended Bradwell Institute in Hinesville, Georgia, where she played high school basketball for the Bradwell Tigers. Milton-Jones graduated from Bradwell in 1993.

== College career ==
Milton-Jones accepted an athletic scholarship to attend the University of Florida in Gainesville, Florida, where she played for coach Carol Ross's Florida Gators women's basketball team from 1993 to 1997. She was a four-year letterman, and led the Lady Gators to four consecutive NCAA Tournament appearances. As a senior in 1996–97, she was recognized as an All-American by the Associated Press, Kodak and the Basketball Times; she was also the winner of the Wade Trophy and the Honda Sports Award for basketball, recognizing the best women's basketball player in NCAA Division I.

Milton-Jones was inducted into the University of Florida Athletic Hall of Fame as a "Gator Great" in 2007.

=== Florida statistics ===
Legend
GP	Games played	GS	Games started	MPG	Minutes per game
FG%	Field goal percentage	3P%	3-point field goal percentage	FT%	Free throw percentage
RPG	Rebounds per game	APG	Assists per game	SPG	Steals per game
BPG	Blocks per game	PPG	Points per game	**Bold**	Career high

Year	Team	GP	Points	FG%	3P%	FT%	RPG	APG	SPG	BPG	PPG
1993-94	Florida	29	339	48.7%	0.0%	61.2%	**11.5**	1.1	2.4	0.4	11.7
1994-95	Florida	**33**	444	**56.8%**	0.0%	61.8%	6.6	0.8	2.5	0.4	13.5
1995-96	Florida	30	462	47.9%	0.0%	69.0%	8.7	1.6	1.5	0.5	15.4
1996-97	Florida	**33**	**613**	56.3%	0.0%	**75.6%**	8.9	**2.0**	2.6	**0.6**	**18.6**
Career		125	1858	52.7%	0.0%	67.9%	8.9	1.4	2.2	0.1	14.9

== USA Basketball ==
Milton-Jones represented the US at the 1997 World University Games held in Marsala, Sicily, Italy, in August 1997. The USA team won all six games, earning the gold medal at the event. Milton-Jones averaged 10.3 points per game and recorded 14 steals, second highest on the team.

Milton-Jones was named to the U.S. national team in 1998. The national team traveled to Berlin, Germany, in July and August 1998 for the FIBA World Championships. The U.S. team won a close opening game against Japan 95–89, then won their next six games easily. In the semifinal game against Brazil, the U.S. team was behind as much as ten points in the first half, but the U.S. team went on to win 93–79. The gold medal game was a rematch against Russia. In the first game, the Americans dominated almost from the beginning, but in the rematch, the Russian team took the early lead and led much of the way. With under two minutes remaining, the U.S. team was down by two points but the Americans responded, then held on to win the gold medal 71–65. Milton-Jones averaged 7.1 points per game.

Milton-Jones is well known for the unusual length of her arms, which give her an eighty-four-inch (210 cm) wingspan—typical of that of a seven-foot person. She was a member of the U.S. national women's basketball teams that won the gold medal at the 2000 Summer Olympics in Sydney, Australia and the 2008 Summer Olympics in Beijing, China, as well as the U.S. women's teams that won world championships in 1998 and 2002.

== Professional career ==
=== ABL ===
Milton-Jones was drafted second overall by the Portland Power in the 1997 American Basketball League (ABL) Draft. During her rookie season, Milton-Jones played in all 44 games and started in 35 of them. She averaged 28.1 minutes per game, 8.5 points, 2.3 assists, 1.5 steals and 4.9 rebounds. The ABL folded in December 1998. The Power played 13 games, all of which Milton-Jones started. She averaged 29.2 minutes per game, 11.9 points, 2.0 assists, 2.4 steals and 9.8 rebounds.

=== WNBA ===
In 1999, Milton-Jones was drafted 4th overall by the Los Angeles Sparks. She would play the first six years of her career with the Sparks from 1999 to 2004, playing alongside Lisa Leslie. During her six-year tenure with the Sparks, Milton-Jones won two WNBA championships in 2001 and 2002.

In 2005, she was traded to the Washington Mystics in exchange for Chamique Holdsclaw and a first-round draft pick in the 2004 off-season.

On April 22, 2008, Milton-Jones was reacquired by the Los Angeles Sparks in a trade for Taj McWilliams-Franklin.

In 2013, she signed with the San Antonio Silver Stars before being released and then signed by the New York Liberty. On July 9, 2014, Milton-Jones was traded to the Atlanta Dream in exchange for Swin Cash.

In August 2015, Milton-Jones played in her 497th WNBA game, a then league-record for most WNBA games played (since broken by Sue Bird).

In 2016, Milton-Jones was released by the Dream.

In September 2016, Miton-Jones officially announced her retirement.

=== Overseas ===
In 2003, she won the Euroleague Championship with team Ekaterinburg in Russia. In the 2005–06 season, she won the Euroleague with Gambrinus Brno of the Czech Republic and for the season 2006–07 she signed a two-year contract with Ros Casares Valencia of Spain. During the 2008–2009 WNBA off-season, Milton-Jones played for Ros Casares Valencia in Spain. for whom she also played during the 2007-08 off-season.

== Coaching career ==
She became the second woman (after Ashley McElhiney) to coach a men's professional basketball team when, in 2005, she took over the ABA's Los Angeles Stars.

On March 29, 2017, she was named the head coach of Pepperdine Waves women's basketball replacing Ryan Weisenberg. In 2019, Milton-Jones resigned from Pepperdine to become an assistant at Syracuse. On April 17, 2020, she was named head coach at Old Dominion University.

== Head coaching record ==
Record table
Season	Team	Overall	Conference	Standing	Postseason
Pepperdine Waves (West Coast Conference) (2017–2019)
2017–18	Pepperdine	10–20	5–13	T–8th	
2018–19	Pepperdine	22–12	12–6	T–3rd	WNIT third round
Pepperdine:		32–32 (.500)	17–19 (.472)		
Old Dominion Monarchs (Conference USA) (2020–2022)
2020–21	Old Dominion	13–11	7–9	T–5th (East)	
2021–22	Old Dominion	24–10	12–6	3rd (East)	WNIT second round
Old Dominion Monarchs (Sun Belt Conference) (2022–present)
2022–23	Old Dominion	22–12	12–6	T–4th	
2023–24	Old Dominion	22–10	12–6	4th	WNIT second round
2024–25	Old Dominion	18–16	9–9	T–5th	WNIT second round
2025–26	Old Dominion	18–14	9–9	6th	
Old Dominion:		117–73 (.616)	61–45 (.575)		
Total:		149–105 (.587)			
National champion Postseason invitational champion Conference regular season champion Conference regular season and conference tournament champion Division regular season champion Division regular season and conference tournament champion Conference tournament champion

== Personal life ==
Milton-Jones appeared in the 2000 movie Love and Basketball as Delisha Milton. In 2003, Milton-Jones married Roland Jones.

== Europe ==
- 2001-2002: Lavezzini Basket Parma (Italy)
- 2002-2004: UMMC Ekaterinburg (Russia)
- 2007-2009: Ros Casares Valencia (Spain)

== Awards and honors ==
Milton-Jones has received numerous awards and honors, some of which are listed below.

=== WNBA ===
- 2× WNBA champion (2001, 2002)
- 3× WNBA All-Star (2000, 2004, 2007)
- WNBA turnovers leader (2007)
- Kim Perrot Sportsmanship Award (2015)
- No. 8 retired by Los Angeles Sparks

=== Gold Medals ===
- 2000 & 2008 Olympic Games
- 2007 Tournament of Americas
- 1998 & 2002 FIBA World Championship
- 2002 Opals World Challenge
- 1999 U.S. Olympic Cup
- 1997 World University Games
- 1994 U.S. Olympic Festival

=== Bronze Medal ===
- 2006 FIBA World Championship

=== Collegiate honors ===
- 1997 SEC Player of the Year
- 1997 State Farm Wade Trophy
- 1997 First-team All-American
- 1997 First-team All-Southeastern Conference
- 1996 First-team All-Southeastern Conference
- 1995 Second-team All-Southeastern Conference
- 1994 Southeastern Conference All-Freshman team
- SEC Player of the Week (February 27, 1995; December 15, 1996; January 5, 1997; January 26, 1997)

== WNBA career statistics ==
Legend
GP	Games played	GS	Games started	MPG	Minutes per game	RPG	Rebounds per game
APG	Assists per game	SPG	Steals per game	BPG	Blocks per game	PPG	Points per game
TO	Turnovers per game	FG%	Field-goal percentage	3P%	3-point field-goal percentage	FT%	Free-throw percentage
**Bold**	Career best	°	League leader

†	Denotes seasons in which Milton-Jones won a WNBA championship

=== Regular season ===
Year	Team	GP	GS	MPG	FG%	3P%	FT%	RPG	APG	SPG	BPG	TO	PPG
1999	Los Angeles	32	32	26.1	**.530**	.000	.791	5.5	1.6	1.5	0.5	2.2	9.9
2000	Los Angeles	32	32	30.7	.512	.250	.745	6.1	2.1	1.4	0.9	2.0	11.8
2001^{†}	Los Angeles	32	27	29.3	.453	.343	.794	5.3	2.1	1.5	0.9	1.8	10.3
2002^{†}	Los Angeles	32	25	30.2	.487	.420	.740	6.6	1.4	1.6	1.1	2.9	11.3
2003	Los Angeles	31	30	**35.0**	.424	.377	.804	**7.1**	2.1	1.6	**1.3**	2.5	13.4
2004	Los Angeles	19	19	31.8	.404	.297	.726	4.7	1.6	1.2	0.5	2.5	9.8
2005	Washington	33	30	32.4	.417	.328	.798	5.2	1.8	**1.7**	0.5	2.2	11.9
2006	Washington	23	20	29.3	.472	**.430**	.810	4.9	2.1	1.5	0.7	2.9	14.6
2007	Washington	**34**	**34**	33.6	.349	.235	.845	6.4	1.6	1.5	1.1	3.5	13.4
2008	Los Angeles	31	31	32.8	.480	.358	.774	6.3	2.4	1.1	0.6	3.0	13.9
2009	Los Angeles	33	33	31.6	.401	.293	.757	4.8	2.2	1.2	0.2	2.2	10.2
2010	Los Angeles	**34**	**34**	32.2	.470	.317	**.866**	4.7	**2.5**	1.1	0.6	2.8	**15.4**
2011	Los Angeles	**34**	**34**	26.2	.462	.352	.831	4.6	2.0	0.9	0.4	2.4	11.7
2012	Los Angeles	**34**	**34**	27.2	.417	.326	.823	4.2	1.8	1.0	0.7	1.8	10.0
2013	San Antonio*	15	15	27.3	.421	.214	.607	4.9	2.0	0.9	0.5	1.7	9.2
2013	New York*	11	2	19.4	.348	.200	.788	3.3	1.7	0.5	0.3	1.5	6.7
2013	Total	26	17	23.9	.398	.208	.705	4.2	1.9	0.7	0.3	**1.6**	8.2
2014	New York*	19	2	16.8	.404	.200	.714	2.5	1.1	0.4	0.3	1.1	5.7
2014	Atlanta*	2	0	11.5	.286	.500	1.000	1.0	0.0	0.5	1.5	1.5	4.5
2014	Total	21	2	27.2	.417	.326	.823	4.2	1.8	1.0	0.7	1.8	2.1
2015	Atlanta	18	1	8.9	.340	.100	.556	1.8	0.4	0.1	0.7	1.7	2.1
Career	17 years, 5 teams	499	435	28.8	.440	.325	.790	5.2	1.8	1.2	0.7	2.4	11.2

=== Postseason ===
Year	Team	GP	GS	MPG	FG%	3P%	FT%	RPG	APG	SPG	BPG	TO	PPG
1999	Los Angeles	4	4	31.8	.450	.000	.429	5.3	2.5	1.8	**1.5**	**1.2**	9.8
2000	Los Angeles	4	4	34.0	.541	.000	.833	5.5	**3.0**	1.5	0.5	2.5	12.5
2001^{†}	Los Angeles	7	7	32.3	**.547**	.375	.684	6.3	2.9	1.0	1.4	1.5	12.3
2002^{†}	Los Angeles	6	3	34.0	.450	.563	.938	6.8	1.3	1.7	**1.5**	1.8	13.0
2003	Los Angeles	**9**	**9**	**37.6**	.443	.556	.771	6.3	2.8	**1.9**	1.4	2.2	**14.6**
2006	Washington	2	2	34.5	.379	.444	**1.000**	**9.0**	2.5	1.5	0.5	3.0	14.0
2008	Los Angeles	6	6	34.3	.407	.357	.733	6.0	1.8	1.3	0.7	2.1	10.7
2009	Los Angeles	6	6	31.7	.351	.308	.625	5.8	2.5	1.7	0.2	2.1	9.0
2010	Los Angeles	2	2	35.5	.360	**1.000**	.500	8.5	1.0	0.5	0.5	2.5	10.5
2012	Los Angeles	4	4	25.3	.375	.500	.778	3.5	1.8	1.0	0.5	2.2	5.5
Career	10 years, 2 teams	50	47	33.4	.440	.459	.741	6.1	2.3	1.5	1.0	2.1	11.5

== See also ==
- List of Florida Gators in the WNBA
- List of multiple Olympic gold medalists
- List of Olympic medalists in basketball
- List of University of Florida alumni
- List of University of Florida Olympians
- List of University of Florida Athletic Hall of Fame members
- List of WNBA career games played leaders
