= 2001 Houston Comets season =

- Head coach: Van Chancellor
- Arena: Compaq Center

Results
- Record: 19–13 (.594)
- Place: 4th (Western)
- Playoff finish: Lost First Round (2-0) to Los Angeles Sparks

Media
- Television: KNWS (IND 51); Fox Sports Net Southwest

The 2001 WNBA season was the fifth season for the Houston Comets. The team advanced to the WNBA Playoffs, but failed to win a fifth consecutive championship.

== Transactions ==
=== WNBA draft ===
Round	Pick	Player	Nationality	School/Team/Country
1	15	Amanda Lassiter	United States	Missouri
2	31	Tynesha Lewis	United States	NC State
3	33	ShaRae Mansfield	United States	Western Kentucky
3	47	Shala Crawford	United States	Life
4	63	Kristen Clement	United States	Tennessee

=== Transactions ===
Date	Transaction
April 20, 2001	Drafted Amanda Lassiter, Tynesha Lewis, ShaRae Mansfield, Shala Crawford and Kristen Clement in the 2001 WNBA draft
April 23, 2001	Traded Jennifer Rizzotti to the Detroit Shock in exchange for Anna DeForge
April 30, 2001	Signed Daliborka Vilipić, Pietra Gay and Trisha Stafford-Odom
May 8, 2001	Waived Pietra Gay and Shala Crawford
May 8, 2001	Signed Angela Aycock and Franthea Price
May 10, 2001	Waived Anna DeForge
May 11, 2001	Waived Franthea Price
May 14, 2001	Waived ShaRae Mansfield
May 25, 2001	Waived Kristen Clement
May 27, 2001	Suspended contracts of Angela Aycock, Daliborka Vilipić, Natalya Zasulskaya and Polina Tzekova
June 6, 2001	Waived Angela Aycock
June 8, 2001	Waived Daliborka Vilipić

== Roster ==
2001 Houston Comets roster
Players
Coaches

Pos.	No.	Nat.	Name	Height	Weight	DOB	From	Yrs
G	9	(Brazil)	Arcain, Janeth	5' 11" (1.8m)	147 lb (67kg)	1969-04-11		4
G/F	3	(United States)	Gibson, Kelley	5' 9" (1.75m)	137 lb (62kg)	1976-11-07	Maryland	1
G	6	(United States)	Henderson, Nekeshia	5' 8" (1.73m)		1973-02-28	Texas	R
F/C	23	(United States)	Jackson, Tammy	6' 2" (1.88m)	190 lb (86kg)	1962-12-03	Florida	4
C	0	(United States)	Johnson, Tiffani	6' 4" (1.93m)	240 lb (109kg)	1975-12-27	Tennessee	2
F	24	(United States)	Lassiter, Amanda	6' 1" (1.85m)	160 lb (73kg)	1979-06-09	Missouri	R
G	20	(United States)	Lewis, Tynesha	5' 10" (1.78m)	152 lb (69kg)	1979-05-08	NC State	R
C	32	(Soviet Union)	Shakirova, Elena	6' 3" (1.91m)	190 lb (86kg)	1970-06-02		1
F	5	(United States)	Stafford-Odom, Trisha	6' 0" (1.83m)	160 lb (73kg)	1970-11-11	California	R
F	7	(United States)	Thompson, Tina	6' 2" (1.88m)	178 lb (81kg)	1975-02-10	USC	4
G	4	(United States)	Washington, Coquese	5' 6" (1.68m)	138 lb (63kg)	1971-01-17	Notre Dame	3

Head coach
(United States) Van Chancellor (Mississippi State)
Assistant coaches
(United States) Kevin Cook
(United States) Alisa Scott
(United States) Michelle Leget

Legend

- (C) Team captain
- (DP) Unsigned draft pick
- (FA) Free agent
- (S) Suspended
- Injured

== Schedule ==
=== Regular season ===
2001 game log
Total: 19–13 (Home: 11–5; Road: 8–8)
May: 1–1 (Home: 0–1; Road: 1–0)

Game	Date	Team	Score	High points	High rebounds	High assists	Location Attendance	Record
1	May 28	Los Angeles	L 63–66	Tina Thompson (23)	Janeth Arcain (6)	Janeth Arcain (4)	Compaq Center	0–1
2	May 31	@ Indiana	W 82–78	Arcain; Thompson (26)	Janeth Arcain (7)	Coquese Washington (6)	Conseco Fieldhouse	1–1

June : 9–1 (Home: 5–0; Road: 4–1)

Game	Date	Team	Score	High points	High rebounds	High assists	Location Attendance	Record
3	June 2	@ Detroit	W 74–73	Tina Thompson (28)	Tina Thompson (11)	Arcain Gibson; Thompson; Washington (2)	The Palace of Auburn Hills	2–1
4	June 5	@ Utah	W 72–68	Janeth Arcain (27)	Tina Thompson (10)	Amanda Lassiter (6)	Delta Center	3–1
5	June 7	Detroit	W 87–66	Janeth Arcain (27)	Tina Thompson (12)	Janeth Arcain (5)	Compaq Center	4–1
6	June 10	@ Phoenix	W 60–58	Tina Thompson (22)	Tina Thompson (10)	Coquese Washington (5)	America West Arena	5–1
7	June 21	Los Angeles	W 69–65	Tina Thompson (29)	Tammy Jackson (7)	Arcain; Washington (5)	Compaq Center	6–1
8	June 23	Sacramento	W 70–56	Tina Thompson (21)	Tina Thompson (9)	Coquese Washington (5)	Compaq Center	7–1
9	June 24	Portland	W 67–57	Arcain; Thompson (22)	Tina Thompson (7)	Coquese Washington (3)	Compaq Center	8–1
10	June 27	Washington	W 76–63	Tina Thompson (24)	Tina Thompson (8)	Coquese Washington (5)	Compaq Center	9–1
11	June 28	@ Sacramento	L 54–64	Tina Thompson (24)	Coquese Washington (8)	Coquese Washington (5)	ARCO Arena	9–2
12	June 30	@ Minnesota	W 59–52	Tina Thompson (17)	Tina Thompson (10)	Arcain; Thompson; Washington (4)	Target Center	10–2

July : 6–6 (Home: 3–3; Road: 3–3)

Game	Date	Team	Score	High points	High rebounds	High assists	Location Attendance	Record
13	July 2	Portland	W 74–67	Tina Thompson (29)	Tina Thompson (12)	Tammy Jackson (4)	Compaq Center	11–2
14	July 6	Indiana	W 79–64	Janeth Arcain (17)	Arcain; Johnson (7)	Coquese Washington (5)	Compaq Center	12–2
15	July 8	Cleveland	L 53–63	Tina Thompson (19)	Lassiter; Washington (5)	Coquese Washington (6)	Compaq Center	12–3
16	July 10	@ Sacramento	L 76–78 (2OT)	Tina Thompson (26)	Amanda Lassiter (13)	Janeth Arcain (6)	ARCO Arena	12–4
17	July 12	@ Portland	W 71–57	Arcain; Thompson (22)	Tynesha Lewis (8)	Janeth Arcain (9)	Rose Garden	13–4
18	July 13	@ Seattle	W 58–55	Tina Thompson (22)	Tina Thompson (9)	Janeth Arcain (4)	KeyArena	14–4
19	July 18	@ Orlando	L 52–57	Janeth Arcain (17)	Tina Thompson (12)	Coquese Washington (4)	TD Waterhouse Centre	14–5
20	July 20	@ Miami	L 50–64	Tammy Jackson (18)	Nekeshia Henderson (5)	Arcain; Lassiter; Shakirova (2)	American Airlines Arena	14–6
21	July 23	@ Minnesota	W 51–46	Tina Thompson (24)	Tina Thompson (10)	Coquese Washington (6)	Target Center	15–6
22	July 24	Utah	L 67–76	Janeth Arcain (29)	Janeth Arcain (8)	Coquese Washington (4)	Compaq Center	15–7
23	July 28	New York	L 61–64	Janeth Arcain (19)	Tina Thompson (9)	Coquese Washington (5)	Compaq Center	15–8
24	July 30	Seattle	W 55–51	Janeth Arcain (16)	Tina Thompson (11)	Tina Thompson (4)	Compaq Center	16–8

August : 3–5 (Home: 3–1; Road: 0–4)

Game	Date	Team	Score	High points	High rebounds	High assists	Location Attendance	Record
25	August 1	Utah	L 63–71	Janeth Arcain (18)	Tiffani Johnson (10)	Janeth Arcain (4)	Compaq Center	16–9
26	August 3	Orlando	W 72–60	Janeth Arcain (18)	Tina Thompson (11)	Coquese Washington (6)	Compaq Center	17–9
27	August 4	@ Charlotte	L 49–54	Janeth Arcain (20)	Tammy Jackson (9)	Coquese Washington (2)	Charlotte Coliseum	17–10
28	August 6	Phoenix	W 62–48	Janeth Arcain (18)	Tina Thompson (7)	Janeth Arcain (5)	Compaq Center	18–10
29	August 8	@ Seattle	L 55–72	Janeth Arcain (24)	Trisha Stafford-Odom (12)	Coquese Washington (4)	KeyArena	18–11
30	August 11	@ Los Angeles	L 54–65	Janeth Arcain (20)	Tina Thompson (6)	Thompson; Washington (5)	Staples Center	18–12
31	August 13	Minnesota	W 74–60	Arcain; Thompson (17)	Trisha Stafford-Odom (9)	Janeth Arcain (3)	Compaq Center	19–12
32	August 14	@ Phoenix	L 38–56	Elena Tornikidou (16)	Wendy Palmer (5)	Edwina Brown (7)	America West Arena	19–13

2001 season schedule

=== Playoffs ===
2001 playoff game log
First round vs. Los Angeles Sparks
Lost Series: 0–2

Game	Date	Team	Score	High points	High rebounds	High assists	Location Attendance	Series
1	August 18	Los Angeles	L 59–64	Amanda Lassiter (17)	Tiffani Johnson (12)	Tina Thompson (5)	Compaq Center	0–1
2	August 20	@ Los Angeles	L 58–70	Janeth Arcain (18)	Coquese Washington (7)	Coquese Washington (3)	Staples Center	0–2

2001 playoff schedule

=== Season standings ===
Western Conference	W	L	PCT	Conf.	GB
Los Angeles Sparks ^{x}	28	4	.875	19–2	–
Sacramento Monarchs ^{x}	20	12	.625	13–8	8.0
Utah Starzz ^{x}	19	13	.594	11–10	9.0
Houston Comets ^{x}	19	13	.594	13–8	9.0
Phoenix Mercury ^{o}	13	19	.406	8–13	15.0
Minnesota Lynx ^{o}	12	20	.375	9–12	16.0
Portland Fire ^{o}	11	21	.344	5–16	17.0
Seattle Storm ^{o}	10	22	.313	6–15	18.0

== Statistics ==
Legend
GP	Games played	GS	Games started	MPG	Minutes per game	RPG	Rebounds per game
APG	Assists per game	SPG	Steals per game	BPG	Blocks per game	PPG	Points per game
FG%	Field-goal percentage	3P%	3-point field-goal percentage	FT%	Free-throw percentage	TO	Turnovers per game
PF	Fouls per game		Team leader		League leader

=== Regular season ===
Player	GP	GS	MPG	FG%	3P%	FT%	RPG	APG	SPG	BPG	PPG
Tina Thompson	30	30	36.7	.377	.293	.840	7.8	1.9	1.0	0.7	19.3
Janeth Arcain	32	32	36.1	.426	.333	.900	4.3	2.9	1.9	0.1	18.5
Coquese Washington	32	32	31.7	.356	.358	.636	3.7	3.8	2.2	0.3	5.3
Tiffani Johnson	32	28	21.0	.449	N/A	.857	4.3	0.7	0.4	0.5	4.6
Amanda Lassiter	32	18	19.2	.367	.388	.667	3.4	1.1	0.5	0.7	4.3
Tynesha Lewis	29	4	14.4	.424	.400	.647	2.1	0.5	0.4	0.1	3.3
Tammy Jackson	32	4	13.8	.500	N/A	.450	2.8	0.7	0.7	0.3	3.3
Trisha Stafford-Odom	30	4	12.2	.368	.000	.673	2.8	0.5	0.4	0.1	3.8
Kelley Gibson	28	6	10.3	.228	.143	.682	1.0	0.5	0.3	0.2	1.6
Nekeshia Henderson	23	0	7.8	.237	.273	.286	0.9	1.0	0.3	0.0	1.1
Elena Shakirova	26	2	7.8	.316	.000	.609	1.3	0.3	0.2	0.1	1.5

^{‡}Waived/Released during the season
^{†}Traded during the season
^{≠}Acquired during the season
