= 2000 Houston Comets season =

- WNBA champions
- Head coach: Van Chancellor
- Arena: Compaq Center

Results
- Record: 27–5 (.844)
- Place: 2nd (Western)
- Playoff finish: Won WNBA Finals

The 2000 WNBA season was the fourth season for the Houston Comets. The Comets won their fourth WNBA Championship and their final title in franchise history before the team disbanded in 2008.

== Transactions ==
=== Indiana Fever expansion draft ===
The following player was selected in the Indiana Fever expansion draft from the Houston Comets:

Player	Nationality	School/Team/Country
Kara Wolters	United States	UConn

=== Portland Fire expansion draft ===
The following player was selected in the Portland Fire expansion draft from the Houston Comets:

Player	Nationality	School/Team/Country
Sophia Witherspoon	United States	Florida

=== WNBA draft ===
Round	Pick	Player	Nationality	School/Team/Country
1	16	Elena Shakirova	Soviet Union	Dynamo Moscow (Russia)
2	32	Andrea Garner	United States	Penn State
3	48	Latavia Coleman	United States	Florida State
4	64	Abbie Willenborg	United States	Marquette

=== Transactions ===
Date	Transaction
December 15, 1999	Lost Kara Wolters to the Indiana Fever in the WNBA expansion draft
December 15, 1999	Lost Sophia Witherspoon to the Portland Fire in the WNBA expansion draft
January 28, 2000	Traded Mila Nikolich to the Portland Fire in exchange for Coquese Washington
April 25, 2000	Drafted Elena Shakirova, Andrea Garner, Latavia Coleman and Abbie Willenborg in the 2000 WNBA draft
April 25, 2000	Traded Latavia Coleman to the Indiana Fever in exchange for Latina Davis and Renee Robinson
May 27, 2000	Traded Andrea Garner to the Seattle Storm in exchange for a 2001 4th Round Pick

== Roster ==
2000 Houston Comets roster
Players
Coaches

Pos.	No.	Nat.	Name	Height	Weight	DOB	From	Yrs
G	9	(Brazil)	Arcain, Janeth	5' 11" (1.8m)	147 lb (67kg)	1969-04-11		3
G	14	(United States)	Cooper, Cynthia	5' 10" (1.78m)	150 lb (68kg)	1963-04-14	USC	3
G/F		(United States)	Gibson, Kelley	5' 9" (1.75m)	137 lb (62kg)	1976-11-07	Maryland	R
F/C	23	(United States)	Jackson, Tammy	6' 2" (1.88m)	190 lb (86kg)	1962-12-03	Florida	3
C	0	(United States)	Johnson, Tiffani	6' 4" (1.93m)	195 lb (88kg)	1975-12-27	Tennessee	1
C	40	(United States)	Lamb, Monica	6' 5" (1.96m)	206 lb (93kg)	1964-10-11	USC	2
G	21	(United States)	Rizzotti, Jennifer	5' 6" (1.68m)	146 lb (66kg)	1974-05-15	Connecticut	1
C	32	(Soviet Union)	Shakirova, Elena	6' 3" (1.91m)	190 lb (86kg)	1970-06-02		R
G/F	22	(United States)	Swoopes, Sheryl	6' 0" (1.83m)	145 lb (66kg)	1971-03-25	Texas Tech	3
F	7	(United States)	Thompson, Tina	6' 2" (1.88m)	178 lb (81kg)	1975-02-10	USC	3
F	13	(Francoist Spain)	Valdemoro, Amaya	6' 1" (1.85m)		1976-08-18		2
G	4	(United States)	Washington, Coquese	5' 6" (1.68m)	138 lb (63kg)	1971-01-17	Notre Dame	2

Head coach
(United States) Van Chancellor (Mississippi State)
Assistant coaches
(United States) Kevin Cook
(United States) Alisa Scott

Legend

- (C) Team captain
- (DP) Unsigned draft pick
- (FA) Free agent
- (S) Suspended
- Injured

== Schedule ==
=== Regular season ===
2000 game log
Total: 27–5 (Home: 14–2; Road: 13–3)
May: 2–0 (Home: 1–0; Road: 1–0)

Game	Date	Team	Score	High points	High rebounds	High assists	Location Attendance	Record
1	May 29	New York	W 84-68	Sheryl Swoopes (27)	Janeth Arcain (8)	Cooper; Thompson (6)	Compaq Center	1–0
2	May 31	@ Portland	W 93-89 (2OT)	Sheryl Swoopes (29)	Johnson; Thompson (9)	Cooper; Swoopes (6)	Rose Garden	2–0

June: 12–2 (Home: 6–1; Road: 6–1)

Game	Date	Team	Score	High points	High rebounds	High assists	Location Attendance	Record
3	June 1	@ Seattle	W 77-47	Sheryl Swoopes (20)	Johnson; Thompson (6)	Cooper (4)	KeyArena	3–0
4	June 3	Phoenix	L 62-80	Sheryl Swoopes (31)	Tina Thompson (9)	Jennifer Rizzotti (4)	Compaq Center	3–1
5	June 6	Sacramento	W 78-70	Sheryl Swoopes (22)	Tina Thompson (10)	Cynthia Cooper (8)	Compaq Center	4–1
6	June 7	@ Washington	W 81-54	Cooper; Swoopes (20)	Tina Thompson (6)	Sheryl Swoopes (5)	MCI Center	5–1
7	June 10	@ Utah	W 73-71	Sheryl Swoopes (22)	Swoopes; Thompson (6)	Sheryl Swoopes (4)	Delta Center	6–1
8	June 12	Utah	W 107-85	Sheryl Swoopes (28)	Sheryl Swoopes (10)	Cynthia Cooper (6)	Compaq Center	7–1
9	June 15	Miami	W 77-53	Tina Thompson (20)	Sheryl Swoopes (6)	Cynthia Cooper (5)	Compaq Center	8–1
10	June 18	Minnesota	W 78-66	Cynthia Cooper (25)	Tiffani Johnson (12)	Sheryl Swoopes (7)	Compaq Center	9–1
11	June 20	@ Los Angeles	L 84-90	Sheryl Swoopes (27)	Johnson; Swoopes; Thompson (7)	Cynthia Cooper (5)	Great Western Forum	9–2
12	June 23	@ Utah	W 83-66	Tina Thompson (28)	Tina Thompson (8)	Sheryl Swoopes (5)	Delta Center	10–2
13	June 24	Indiana	W 93-67	Tina Thompson (23)	Shakirova; Thompson (7)	Sheryl Swoopes (7)	Compaq Center	11–2
14	June 26	@ Orlando	W 70-58	Tina Thompson (19)	Sheryl Swoopes (9)	Cynthia Cooper (6)	TD Waterhouse Centre	12–2
15	June 28	@ Charlotte	W 76-66	Sheryl Swoopes (22)	Tina Thompson (8)	Cynthia Cooper (5)	Charlotte Coliseum	13–2
16	June 30	Portland	W 79-39	Janeth Arcain (18)	Tina Thompson (7)	Sheryl Swoopes (6)	Compaq Center	14–2

July: 8–3 (Home: 5–1; Road: 3–2)

Game	Date	Team	Score	High points	High rebounds	High assists	Location Attendance	Record
17	July 2	Phoenix	W 69-58	Cooper; Swoopes (20)	Tina Thompson (11)	Tina Thompson (4)	Compaq Center	15–2
18	July 6	Seattle	W 80-50	Tina Thompson (23)	Tina Thompson (6)	Sheryl Swoopes (9)	Compaq Center	16–2
19	July 7	Charlotte	W 86-71	Sheryl Swoopes (30)	Sheryl Swoopes (8)	Cynthia Cooper (7)	Compaq Center	17–2
20	July 9	@ Minnesota	W 70-60	Sheryl Swoopes (19)	Tina Thompson (10)	Cynthia Cooper (7)	Target Center	18–2
21	July 12	Sacramento	W 77-62	Sheryl Swoopes (25)	Swoopes; Thompson (9)	Cynthia Cooper (7)	Compaq Center	19–2
22	July 14	@ Los Angeles	L 58-63	Sheryl Swoopes (26)	Tina Thompson (7)	Coquese Washington (4)	Great Western Forum	19–3
23	July 20	@ Cleveland	W 74-56	Sheryl Swoopes (19)	Tina Thompson (12)	Cynthia Cooper (5)	Gund Arena	20–3
24	July 21	@ Detroit	W 76-74 (OT)	Cynthia Cooper (27)	Tiffani Johnson (15)	Cynthia Cooper (4)	The Palace of Auburn Hills	21–3
25	July 23	@ New York	L 64-69	Sheryl Swoopes (18)	Sheryl Swoopes (9)	Sheryl Swoopes (5)	Madison Square Garden	21–4
26	July 25	Seattle	W 79-53	Cynthia Cooper (28)	Tina Thompson (6)	Cynthia Cooper (5)	Compaq Center	22–4
27	July 29	Los Angeles	L 74-84	Cynthia Cooper (25)	Tina Thompson (8)	Cynthia Cooper (6)	Compaq Center	22–5

August: 5–0 (Home: 2–0; Road: 3–0)

Game	Date	Team	Score	High points	High rebounds	High assists	Location Attendance	Record
28	August 1	Washington	W 68-60	Tina Thompson (16)	Arcain; Cooper; Thompson (5)	Cynthia Cooper (8)	Compaq Center	23–5
29	August 4	@ Portland	W 81-56	Cynthia Cooper (26)	Swoopes; Thompson (10)	Cynthia Cooper (5)	Rose Garden	24–5
30	August 6	@ Sacramento	W 76-63	Sheryl Swoopes (25)	Tina Thompson (13)	Cynthia Cooper (6)	ARCO Arena	25–5
31	August 7	@ Phoenix	W 71-54	Tina Thompson (26)	Tina Thompson (10)	Cynthia Cooper (6)	America West Arena	26–5
32	August 9	Minnesota	W 77-64	Tina Thompson (25)	Swoopes; Thompson (8)	Arcain; Cooper; Thompson (3)	Compaq Center	27–5

=== Playoffs ===
2000 playoff game log
First round vs. Sacramento Monarchs
Won Series: 2–0

Game	Date	Team	Score	High points	High rebounds	High assists	Location Attendance	Series
1	August 12	@ Sacramento	W 72–64	Cynthia Cooper (25)	Tiffani Johnson (8)	Cooper; Thompson (3)	ARCO Arena	1–0
2	August 14	Sacramento	W 75–70	Sheryl Swoopes (27)	Tina Thompson (14)	Sheryl Swoopes (6)	Compaq Center	2–0

Conference Finals vs. Los Angeles Sparks
Won Series: 2–0

Game	Date	Team	Score	High points	High rebounds	High assists	Location Attendance	Series
1	August 17	Los Angeles	W 77–56	Sheryl Swoopes (22)	Arcain; Swoopes (6)	Arcain; Thompson (3)	Compaq Center	1–0
2	August 29	@ Los Angeles	W 74–69	Cynthia Cooper (29)	Tina Thompson (6)	Sheryl Swoopes (6)	Great Western Forum	2–0

Championship vs. New York Liberty
Won Series: 2–0

Game	Date	Team	Score	High points	High rebounds	High assists	Location Attendance	Series
1	August 24	@ New York	W 59–52	Cynthia Cooper (20)	Swoopes; Thompson (8)	Cynthia Cooper (5)	Madison Square Garden	1–0
2	August 26	New York	W 79–73 (OT)	Sheryl Swoopes (31)	Tina Thompson (8)	Cynthia Cooper (7)	Compaq Center	2–0

2000 playoff schedule

=== Season standings ===
Western Conference	W	L	PCT	Conf.	GB
Los Angeles Sparks ^{x}	28	4	.875	17–4	–
Houston Comets ^{x}	27	5	.844	17–4	1.0
Sacramento Monarchs ^{x}	21	11	.656	13–8	7.0
Phoenix Mercury ^{x}	20	12	.625	11–10	8.0
Utah Starzz ^{o}	18	14	.563	13–8	10.0
Minnesota Lynx ^{o}	15	17	.469	5–16	13.0
Portland Fire ^{o}	10	22	.313	4–17	18.0
Seattle Storm ^{o}	6	26	.188	4–17	22.0

== Statistics ==
Legend
GP	Games played	GS	Games started	MPG	Minutes per game	RPG	Rebounds per game
APG	Assists per game	SPG	Steals per game	BPG	Blocks per game	PPG	Points per game
FG%	Field-goal percentage	3P%	3-point field-goal percentage	FT%	Free-throw percentage	TO	Turnovers per game
PF	Fouls per game		Team leader		League leader

=== Regular season ===
Player	GP	GS	MPG	FG%	3P%	FT%	RPG	APG	SPG	BPG	PPG
Sheryl Swoopes	31	31	35.5	.506	.374	.821	6.3	3.8	2.8	1.1	20.7
Cynthia Cooper	31	31	35.0	.459	.355	.875	2.7	5.0	1.3	0.2	17.7
Tina Thompson	32	32	34.0	.469	.417	.837	7.7	1.5	1.5	0.8	16.9
Janeth Arcain	32	32	30.5	.468	.200	.837	3.7	1.9	1.3	0.1	8.4
Tiffani Johnson	31	29	22.2	.480	N/A	.700	4.7	0.3	0.3	0.5	4.2
Jennifer Rizzotti	32	2	13.7	.382	.308	.667	1.1	1.4	0.5	0.1	1.9
Tammy Jackson	29	1	11.7	.574	N/A	.545	2.1	0.4	0.4	0.3	2.6
Monica Lamb	13	2	10.8	.500	N/A	.500	2.0	0.2	0.2	0.3	2.0
Elena Shakirova	14	0	10.7	.433	.167	.879	2.2	0.3	0.4	0.1	4.1
Coquese Washington	25	0	9.4	.364	.200	.800	0.8	1.0	0.6	0.0	1.7
Amaya Valdemoro	22	0	7.8	.333	.379	1.000	1.0	0.6	0.4	0.2	2.6
Kelley Gibson	17	0	4.5	.368	.429	.875	0.7	0.1	0.1	0.0	1.4

^{‡}Waived/Released during the season
^{†}Traded during the season
^{≠}Acquired during the season

== Awards and honors ==
- Cynthia Cooper, WNBA Finals MVP Award
- Cynthia Cooper, Best WNBA Player ESPY Award
- Sheryl Swoopes, WNBA Most Valuable Player Award
- Sheryl Swoopes, WNBA Defensive Player of the Year Award
