= 2000 WNBA Championship =

US basketball competition

2000 WNBA Finals
Team	Coach	Wins
Houston Comets	Van Chancellor	2
New York Liberty	Richie Adubato	0
- Dates: August 24-26
- MVP: Cynthia Cooper (Houston Comets)
- Hall of Famers: Comets: Cynthia Cooper (2010); Sheryl Swoopes (2016); Tina Thompson (2018); Liberty: Becky Hammon (2023); Rebecca Lobo (2017; did not play); Teresa Weatherspoon (2019); Coaches: Van Chancellor (2007)
- Eastern finals: New York defeated Cleveland, 2–1
- Western finals: Houston defeated Los Angeles, 2–0

The 2000 WNBA Championship was the championship series of the 2000 WNBA season, and the conclusion of the season's playoffs. The Houston Comets, second-seeded champions of the Western Conference, defeated the New York Liberty, first-seeded champions of the Eastern Conference, two games to none in a best-of-three series. This was Houston's fourth title.

The Comets made their fourth appearance in the Finals in franchise history. The Liberty also made their third Finals appearance.

Going into the series, no other team except the Houston Comets had won a WNBA championship (1997–1999).

The Comets had a 27–5 record (.844), good enough to receive home-court advantage over the Liberty (20–12). It did not matter, however, as the Comets swept the Liberty.

== Road to the finals ==
Houston Comets		New York Liberty
27–5 (.844); 2nd West, 2nd overall	Regular season	20–12 (.562); 1st East, 4th overall
Defeated the (3) Sacramento Monarchs, 2–0	Conference Semifinals	Defeated the (4) Washington Mystics, 2–0
Defeated the (1) Los Angeles Sparks, 2–0	Conference Finals	Defeated the (2) Cleveland Rockers, 2–1

=== Regular season series ===
The Comets and the Liberty split the regular season series:

May 29

Recap at the Wayback Machine (archived October 21, 2000)

New York Liberty 68, Houston Comets 84

Compaq Center, Houston
Attendance: 16,285

July 23

Recap at the Wayback Machine (archived October 22, 2000)

Houston Comets 64, New York Liberty 69

Madison Square Garden, New York
Attendance: 19,563

== Game summaries ==
All times listed below are Eastern Daylight Time.

=== Game 1 ===
Lifetime

August 24

Recap at the Wayback Machine (archived October 23, 2000)

Houston Comets 59, New York Liberty 52
Scoring by half: 29–22, 30–39
Pts: Cooper (20); Rebs: Swoopes, Thompson (8); Asts: Cooper (5)	Pts: Phillips (24); Rebs: Phillips (15); Asts: Weatherspoon (5)

Madison Square Garden, New York
Attendance: 19,563
Referees:
- Sally Bell
- Dennis DeMayo
- Gary Zielinski

=== Game 2 ===
NBC

August 26

Recap at the Wayback Machine (archived October 23, 2000)

New York Liberty 73, Houston Comets 79 (OT)
Scoring by half: 25–27, 39–37 Overtime: 9–15
Pts: Phillips (20); Rebs: Phillips (7); Asts: Weatherspoon (8)	Pts: Swoopes (31); Rebs: Thompson (8); Asts: Cooper (7)

Compaq Center, Houston
Attendance: 16,285
Referees:
- June Corteau
- Courtney Kirkland
- Michael Price

== Rosters ==
2000 Houston Comets Finals roster
Players
Coaches

Pos.	No.	Nat.	Name	Height	Weight	From
F	4	(Brazil)	Arcain, Janeth	5' 11" (1.8m)	147 lb (67kg)	Brazil
G	14	(United States)	Cooper, Cynthia	5' 10" (1.78m)	150 lb (68kg)	USC
F	23	(United States)	Jackson, Tammy	6' 2" (1.88m)	190 lb (86kg)	Florida
C	00	(United States)	Johnson, Tiffani	6' 4" (1.93m)	195 lb (88kg)	Tennessee
G	3	(United States)	Kelley-Gibson, Jawann	5' 9" (1.75m)	137 lb (62kg)	Maryland
C	40	(United States)	Lamb, Monica	6' 5" (1.96m)	206 lb (93kg)	USC
G	21	(United States)	Rizzotti, Jennifer	5' 6" (1.68m)	146 lb (66kg)	Connecticut
F	22	(United States)	Swoopes, Sheryl	6' 0" (1.83m)	145 lb (66kg)	Texas Tech
F	7	(United States)	Thompson, Tina	6' 2" (1.88m)	178 lb (81kg)	USC
F	13	(Spain)	Valdemoro, Amaya	6' 1" (1.85m)	160 lb (73kg)	Spain
G	4	(United States)	Washington, Coquese	5' 6" (1.68m)	138 lb (63kg)	Notre Dame

Head coach
(United States) Van Chancellor (Mississippi State)
Assistant coaches
(United States) Kevin Cook
(United States) Alisa Scott

Legend

- (C) Team captain
- (DP) Unsigned draft pick
- (FA) Free agent
- (S) Suspended
- Injured

2000 New York Liberty Finals roster
Players
Coaches

Pos.	No.	Nat.	Name	Height	Weight	From
G	22	(Australia)	Bibby, Jessica	5' 7" (1.7m)	139 lb (63kg)	Australia
F	13	(Spain)	Ferragut, Marina	6' 3" (1.91m)	190 lb (86kg)	Spain
C		(Ukraine)	Firsova, Olga	6' 8" (2.03m)	215 lb (98kg)	Kansas State
F	42	(United States)	Francis, Desiree	5' 10" (1.78m)	193 lb (88kg)	Iowa State
G	25	(United States)	Hammon, Becky	5' 6" (1.68m)	136 lb (62kg)	Colorado State
G	55	(United States)	Johnson, Vickie	5' 9" (1.75m)	150 lb (68kg)	Louisiana Tech
C	50	(United States)	Lobo, Rebecca (injured)	6' 4" (1.93m)	185 lb (84kg)	Connecticut
F	24	(United States)	Phillips, Tari	6' 1" (1.85m)	200 lb (91kg)	University of Central Florida
F	3	(United States)	Robinson, Crystal	5' 10" (1.78m)	175 lb (79kg)	Southeastern Oklahoma State University
G	11	(United States)	Weatherspoon, Teresa	5' 8" (1.73m)	161 lb (73kg)	Louisiana Tech
F	44	(United States)	Whitmore, Tamika	6' 2" (1.88m)	190 lb (86kg)	Memphis
F	23	(United States)	Wicks, Sue	6' 3" (1.91m)	174 lb (79kg)	Rutgers

Head coach
(United States) Richie Adubato (William Paterson)
Assistant coaches
(United States) Pat Coyle (Rutgers)
(United States) Jeff House

Legend

- (C) Team captain
- (DP) Unsigned draft pick
- (FA) Free agent
- (S) Suspended
- Injured
