= 2000 New York Liberty season =

- Head coach: Richie Adubato
- Arena: Madison Square Garden

Results
- Record: 20–12 (.625)
- Place: 1st (Eastern)
- Playoff finish: Lost WNBA Finals (2-0) to Houston Comets

The 2000 WNBA season was the fourth season for the New York Liberty. The team reached the WNBA Finals for the third time, but they were swept by the Houston Comets.

== Transactions ==
=== Portland Fire expansion draft ===
The following players were selected in the Portland Fire expansion draft from the New York Liberty:

Player	Nationality	School/Team/Country
Coquese Washington	United States	Notre Dame

=== Seattle Storm expansion draft ===
The following players were selected in the Seattle Storm expansion draft from the New York Liberty:

Player	Nationality	School/Team/Country
Sonja Henning	United States	Stanford

=== WNBA draft ===
Round	Pick	Player	Nationality	School/Team/Country
1	13	Olga Firsova	Soviet Union	Kansas State
2	29	Desiree Francis	Antigua	Iowa State
3	45	Jessica Bibby	Australia	Dandenong Rangers (Australia)
4	61	Natalie Porter	Australia	Dandenong Rangers (Australia)

=== Transactions ===
Date	Transaction
December 15, 1999	Lost Coquese Washington to the Portland Fire in the WNBA expansion draft
December 15, 1999	Lost Sonja Henning to the Seattle Storm in the WNBA expansion draft
April 25, 2000	Drafted Olga Firsova, Desiree Francis, Jessica Bibby and Natalie Porter in the 2000 WNBA draft
May 2, 2000	Signed Alessandra Santos de Oliveira, Marina Ferragut and Shea Mahoney
May 15, 2000	Waived Natalie Porter
May 28, 2000	Traded Carolyn Jones-Young to the Portland Fire in exchange for Tari Phillips
May 28, 2000	Waived Alessandra Santos de Oliveira and Desiree Francis
June 2, 2000	Waived Venus Lacy
September 18, 2000	Traded a 2001 1st Round Pick to the Minnesota Lynx in exchange for Grace Daley

== Roster ==
2000 New York Liberty roster
Players
Coaches

Pos.	No.	Nat.	Name	Height	Weight	DOB	From	Yrs
G	22	(Australia)	Bibby, Jessica	5' 7" (1.7m)	139 lb (63kg)	1979-08-23		R
F	13	(Francoist Spain)	Ferragut, Marina	6' 3" (1.91m)	190 lb (86kg)	1972-02-11		R
C	0	(Soviet Union)	Firsova, Olga	6' 8" (2.03m)	215 lb (98kg)	1976-04-23	Kansas State	R
F	42	(Antigua and Barbuda)	Francis, Desiree	5' 10" (1.78m)	193 lb (88kg)	1975-08-24	Iowa State	R
G	25	(United States)	Hammon, Becky	5' 6" (1.68m)	136 lb (62kg)	1977-03-11	Colorado State	1
G/F	55	(United States)	Johnson, Vickie	5' 9" (1.75m)	150 lb (68kg)	1972-04-15	Louisiana Tech	3
C	5	(United States)	Lacy, Venus	6' 3" (1.91m)	234 lb (106kg)	1967-02-09	Louisiana Tech	1
F	30	(United States)	Mahoney, Shea	6' 4" (1.93m)		1977-07-03	Western Kentucky	R
F/C	24	(United States)	Phillips, Tari	6' 2" (1.88m)	200 lb (91kg)	1970-03-06	Central Florida	1
F	3	(United States)	Robinson, Crystal	5' 11" (1.8m)	155 lb (70kg)	1974-01-22	SE Oklahoma State	1
G	11	(United States)	Weatherspoon, Teresa	5' 8" (1.73m)	161 lb (73kg)	1965-12-08	Louisiana Tech	3
F	44	(United States)	Whitmore, Tamika	6' 2" (1.88m)	215 lb (98kg)	1977-06-05	Memphis	1
F	23	(United States)	Wicks, Sue	6' 3" (1.91m)	174 lb (79kg)	1966-11-26	Rutgers	3

Head coach
(United States) Richie Adubato (William Paterson)
Assistant coaches
(United States) Lisa White
(United States) Jeff House
(United States) Pat Coyle

Legend

- (C) Team captain
- (DP) Unsigned draft pick
- (FA) Free agent
- (S) Suspended
- Injured

== Schedule ==
=== Regular season ===
2000 game log
Total: 15–17 (Home: 8–8; Road: 7–9)
May: 0–2 (Home: 0–0; Road: 0–2)

Game	Date	Team	Score	High points	High rebounds	High assists	Location Attendance	Record
1	May 29	@ Houston	L 68-84	Tamika Whitmore (15)	Sue Wicks (6)	Teresa Weatherspoon (13)	Compaq Center	0–1
2	May 31	@ Phoenix	L 48-51	Vickie Johnson (14)	Mahoney; Wicks (8)	Teresa Weatherspoon (5)	America West Arena	0–2

June: 7–5 (Home: 4–4; Road: 3–1)

Game	Date	Team	Score	High points	High rebounds	High assists	Location Attendance	Record
3	June 3	Utah	W 87-76	Becky Hammon (23)	Tari Phillips (7)	Teresa Weatherspoon(7)	Madison Square Garden	1–2
4	June 4	@ Washington	L 67-79	Vickie Johnson (12)	Vickie Johnson (7)	Teresa Weatherspoon (6)	MCI Center	1–3
5	June 7	@ Detroit	W 73-69	Vickie Johnson (22)	Vickie Johnson (12)	Teresa Weatherspoon (8)	The Palace of Auburn Hills	2–3
6	June 9	Sacramento	L 56-77	Tari Phillips (25)	Sue Wicks (12)	Hammon; Weatherspoon (3)	Madison Square Garden	2–4
7	June 10	@ Indiana	W 70-62	Crystal Robinson (19)	Vickie Johnson (7)	Teresa Weatherspoon (6)	Conseco Fieldhouse	3–4
8	June 13	Washington	L 56-57	Johnson; Weatherspoon (14)	Tari Phillips (12)	Vickie Johnson (4)	Madison Square Garden	3–5
9	June 18	Miami	W 58-52	Crystal Robinson (18)	Tari Phillips (10)	Teresa Weatherspoon (7)	Madison Square Garden	4–5
10	June 21	Detroit	L 63-67	Tamika Whitmore (14)	Tari Phillips (8)	Teresa Weatherspoon (7)	Madison Square Garden	4–6
11	June 23	@ Indiana	W 69-60	Becky Hammon (16)	Sue Wicks (10)	Teresa Weatherspoon (8)	Conseco Fieldhouse	5–6
12	June 25	Los Angeles	L 67-72	Becky Hammon (18)	Tari Phillips (11)	Teresa Weatherspoon (6)	Madison Square Garden	5–7
13	June 28	Phoenix	W 82-69	Tari Phillips (22)	Tari Phillips (10)	Teresa Weatherspoon (8)	Madison Square Garden	6–7
14	June 30	Indiana	W 72-70	Tari Phillips (30)	Tari Phillips (12)	Teresa Weatherspoon (12)	Madison Square Garden	7–7

July: 11–3 (Home: 6–0; Road: 5–3)

Game	Date	Team	Score	High points	High rebounds	High assists	Location Attendance	Record
15	July 1	@ Orlando	L 57-69	Tari Phillips (21)	Tari Phillips (6)	Teresa Weatherspoon (10)	TD Waterhouse Centre	7–8
16	July 3	@ Cleveland	L 65-66 (OT)	Tamika Whitmore (17)	Tari Phillips (8)	Vickie Johnson (6)	Gund Arena	7–9
17	July 5	Portland	W 62-45	Hammon; Johnson (15)	Tari Phillips (10)	Teresa Weatherspoon (7)	Madison Square Garden	8–9
18	July 7	@ Minnesota	W 76-70	Tari Phillips (26)	Tari Phillips (12)	Teresa Weatherspoon (8)	Target Center	9–9
19	July 8	Miami	W 63-51	Tamika Whitmore (17)	Sue Wicks (8)	Teresa Weatherspoon (6)	Madison Square Garden	10–9
20	July 12	Charlotte	W 84-70	Vickie Johnson (19)	Tari Phillips (7)	Teresa Weatherspoon (7)	Madison Square Garden	11–9
21	July 14	@ Orlando	W 55-51	Vickie Johnson (15)	Tari Phillips (7)	Teresa Weatherspoon (7)	TD Waterhouse Centre	12–9
22	July 19	@ Seattle	W 78-55	Vickie Johnson (18)	Tari Phillips (9)	Teresa Weatherspoon (5)	KeyArena	13–9
23	July 20	@ Los Angeles	L 66-82	Vickie Johnson (17)	Sue Wicks (6)	Teresa Weatherspoon (5)	Great Western Forum	13–10
24	July 23	Houston	W 69-64	Hammon; Phillips (17)	Tari Phillips (11)	Johnson; Weatherspoon (6)	Madison Square Garden	14–10
25	July 24	@ Washington	W 78-64	Vickie Johnson (22)	Tari Phillips (9)	Teresa Weatherspoon (7)	MCI Center	15–10
26	July 28	@ Charlotte	W 66-56	Johnson; Phillips (15)	Tari Phillips (11)	Weatherspoon; Wicks (4)	Charlotte Coliseum	16–10
27	July 29	Cleveland	W 81-67	Crystal Robinson (17)	Vickie Johnson (6)	Teresa Weatherspoon (7)	Madison Square Garden	17–10
28	July 31	Charlotte	W 81-56	Vickie Johnson (20)	Tari Phillips (9)	Teresa Weatherspoon (5)	Madison Square Garden	18–10

August: 2–2 (Home: 2–0; Road: 0–2)

Game	Date	Team	Score	High points	High rebounds	High assists	Location Attendance	Record
29	August 4	Orlando	W 70-57	Tari Phillips (18)	Tamika Whitmore (8)	Vickie Johnson (8)	Madison Square Garden	19–10
30	August 6	@ Miami	L 41-57	Tamika Whitmore (10)	Tamika Whitmore (10)	Crystal Robinson (4)	American Airlines Arena	19–11
31	August 8	Cleveland	W 57-44	Tari Phillips (14)	Tari Phillips (11)	Teresa Weatherspoon (7)	Madison Square Garden	20–11
32	August 9	@ Detroit	L 63-66	Tari Phillips (14)	Tari Phillips (5)	Teresa Weatherspoon (7)	The Palace of Auburn Hills	20–12

=== Playoffs ===
2000 playoff game log
First round vs. Washington Mystics
Won Series: 2–0

Game	Date	Team	Score	High points	High rebounds	High assists	Location Attendance	Record
1	August 12	@ Washington	W 72–63	Johnson; Phillips (20)	Vickie Johnson (8)	Teresa Weatherspoon (9)	MCI Center	1–0
2	August 14	Washington	W 78–57	Becky Hammon (19)	Tari Phillips (10)	Teresa Weatherspoon (10)	Madison Square Garden	2–0

Conference Finals vs. Cleveland Rockers
Won Series: 2–1

Game	Date	Team	Score	High points	High rebounds	High assists	Location Attendance	Record
1	August 17	@ Cleveland	L 43–56	Tari Phillips (11)	Tari Phillips (6)	Teresa Weatherspoon (3)	Gund Arena	0–1
2	August 20	Cleveland	W 51–45	Becky Hammon (13)	Tari Phillips (6)	Teresa Weatherspoon (5)	Madison Square Garden	1–1
3	August 21	Cleveland	W 81–67	Tamika Whitmore (19)	Sue Wicks (7)	Vickie Johnson (10)	Madison Square Garden	2–1

Championship vs. Houston Comets
Lost Series: 0–2

Game	Date	Team	Score	High points	High rebounds	High assists	Location Attendance	Record
1	August 24	Houston	L 52–59	Tari Phillips (24)	Tari Phillips (15)	Teresa Weatherspoon (5)	Madison Square Garden	0–1
2	August 26	@ Houston	L 73–79	Tari Phillips (20)	Tari Phillips (7)	Teresa Weatherspoon (8)	Compaq Center	0-2

2000 playoff schedule

=== Season standings ===
Eastern Conference	W	L	PCT	Conf.	GB
New York Liberty ^{x}	20	12	.625	14–7	–
Cleveland Rockers ^{x}	17	15	.531	13–8	3.0
Orlando Miracle ^{x}	16	16	.500	13–8	4.0
Washington Mystics ^{x}	14	18	.438	13–8	6.0
Detroit Shock ^{o}	14	18	.438	10–11	6.0
Miami Sol ^{o}	13	19	.406	9–12	7.0
Indiana Fever ^{o}	9	23	.281	7–14	11.0
Charlotte Sting ^{o}	8	24	.250	5–16	12.0

== Statistics ==
Legend
GP	Games played	GS	Games started	MPG	Minutes per game	RPG	Rebounds per game
APG	Assists per game	SPG	Steals per game	BPG	Blocks per game	PPG	Points per game
FG%	Field-goal percentage	3P%	3-point field-goal percentage	FT%	Free-throw percentage	TO	Turnovers per game
PF	Fouls per game		Team leader		League leader

=== Regular season ===
Player	GP	GS	MPG	FG%	3P%	FT%	RPG	APG	SPG	BPG	PPG
Teresa Weatherspoon	32	32	33.7	.438	.250	.741	3.4	6.4	2.0	0.2	6.4
Vickie Johnson	31	31	33.0	.441	.380	.882	4.4	2.5	0.7	0.2	12.3
Tari Phillips	31	30	31.5	.467	.250	.654	8.0	0.9	1.9	0.7	13.8
Crystal Robinson	27	14	26.7	.428	.353	.909	2.5	1.8	0.9	0.4	8.8
Becky Hammon	32	16	26.1	.472	.369	.884	2.0	1.8	0.9	0.0	11.0
Tamika Whitmore	32	16	21.5	.431	.000	.702	3.3	0.6	0.5	0.5	8.7
Sue Wicks	32	12	21.3	.385	.200	.726	4.7	0.7	0.8	1.2	4.9
Shea Mahoney	15	3	10.5	.289	.200	.500	2.0	0.3	0.1	0.1	1.8
Venus Lacy	2	2	9.0	.400	N/A	.500	2.5	0.0	0.0	0.0	3.0
Marina Ferragut	23	4	6.7	.434	.300	.500	0.7	0.2	0.0	0.1	2.2
Jessica Bibby	17	0	4.1	.167	.333	.846	0.3	0.6	0.2	0.0	1.1
Olga Firsova	9	0	2.1	.400	.000	.800	0.4	0.1	0.0	0.1	1.3
Desiree Francis	1	0	2.0	.000	N/A	N/A	0.0	0.0	0.0	0.0	0.0

^{‡}Waived/Released during the season
^{†}Traded during the season
^{≠}Acquired during the season
