= Tiffani Johnson =

American basketball player (born 1975)

Personal information
- Born: December 27, 1975 (age 50) Charlotte, North Carolina, U.S.
- Listed height: 6 ft 4 in (1.93 m)
- Listed weight: 240 lb (109 kg)

Career information
- High school: Garinger (Charlotte, North Carolina)
- College: Tennessee (1994–1997)
- WNBA draft: 1998: undrafted
- Playing career: 1998–2008
- Position: Center
- Number: 4, 0, 5

Career history
- 1998: Sacramento Monarchs
- 2000–2004: Houston Comets
- 2006: Seattle Storm

Career highlights
- WNBA champion (2000); 2× NCAA champion (1996, 1997); North Carolina Miss Basketball (1994)
- Stats at Basketball Reference

Tiffani Tamara Johnson (born December 27, 1975) is an American former professional basketball player. She played in the Women's National Basketball Association (WNBA) for the Sacramento Monarchs, Houston Comets and Seattle Storm. Johnson won a WNBA championship with the Comets in 2000. She played college basketball for the Tennessee Lady Volunteers and won two NCAA championships in 1996 and 1997.

== High school career ==
Johnson attended Garinger High School in Charlotte, North Carolina, and was selected as North Carolina Miss Basketball in 1994. She was considered one of the most dominant players in state history as she averaged 28 points and 20 rebounds per game during her senior season. Johnson committed to play college basketball for the Tennessee Lady Volunteers for its tradition and intensity level.

== College career ==
Johnson won her first NCAA championship with the Lady Volunteers in 1996 as she scored 16 points in the title game. At the end of the season, she was suspended for disciplinary reasons and barred from attending team functions including visiting the White House. Johnson won a second NCAA championship with the Lady Volunteers in 1997. She was dropped from the team in 1997 before her senior season by head coach Pat Summitt for disciplinary reasons.

== Professional career ==
Johnson declared for the 1998 American Basketball League (ABL) draft, and was selected as the 26th overall pick by the San Jose Lasers.

Johnson was included on the training camp roster of the Los Angeles Sparks during the 1999 season.

Johnson was a starter for the Houston Comets when they won a WNBA championship in 2000.

On February 22, 2004, Johnson signed with the Houston Stealth of the National Women's Basketball League.

On May 18, 2005, Johnson was waived by the Comets. At the time, she ranked fourth all-time with the Comets in games played (150), total rebounds (643) and blocked shots (79).

Johnson played for the Seattle Storm during the 2006 season as a late addition to the team.

On April 2, 2008, Johnson signed a training camp deal with the New York Liberty. She was waived by the team on May 14, 2008.

== Career statistics ==
Legend
GP	Games played	GS	Games started	MPG	Minutes per game	RPG	Rebounds per game
APG	Assists per game	SPG	Steals per game	BPG	Blocks per game	PPG	Points per game
TO	Turnovers per game	FG%	Field-goal percentage	3P%	3-point field-goal percentage	FT%	Free-throw percentage
**Bold**	Career best	°	League leader

=== WNBA ===
==== Regular season ====
Year	Team	GP	GS	MPG	FG%	3P%	FT%	RPG	APG	SPG	BPG	TO	PPG
1998	Sacramento	6	0	5.3	0.0	0.0	50.0	1.7	0.0	0.3	0.0	**0.5**	0.3
1999	Did not play (waived)												
2000	Houston	31	29	22.2	48.0	0.0	70.0	4.7	0.3	0.3	0.5	**0.5**	4.2
2001	Houston	32	28	21.0	44.9	0.0	**85.7**	4.3	0.7	0.4	0.5	1.3	4.6
2002	Houston	32	**32**	**25.5**	43.3	0.0	81.0	**5.4**	**1.2**	**0.5**	**0.8**	1.2	**6.3**
2003	Houston	22	3	16.3	48.4	0.0	73.9	2.9	0.6	0.1	0.3	0.9	3.5
2004	Houston	**33**	11	20.0	**50.0**	0.0	75.0	3.7	0.8	0.3	0.5	0.9	4.3
2005	Did not play (waived)												
2006	Seattle	32	8	19.9	41.5	0.0	75.7	3.9	0.5	0.3	0.5	1.0	4.7
Career	7 years, 3 teams	188	111	20.5	45.0	0.0	76.3	4.1	0.7	0.3	0.5	1.0	4.5

==== Playoffs ====
Year	Team	GP	GS	MPG	FG%	3P%	FT%	RPG	APG	SPG	BPG	TO	PPG
2000	Houston	**6**	**6**	22.5	**50.0**	0.0	**100.0**	4.8	0.2	0.5	0.3	1.2	3.7
2001	Houston	2	2	**35.5**	41.2	0.0	57.1	**8.5**	1.5	0.0	1.5	2.0	**9.0**
2002	Houston	3	3	17.0	44.4	0.0	0.0	3.0	0.3	0.0	**2.0**	1.3	2.7
2003	Houston	3	0	10.3	0.0	0.0	0.0	2.0	0.0	**0.7**	0.0	**0.3**	0.0
2006	Seattle	3	0	21.0	**50.0**	0.0	**100.0**	4.3	**1.7**	0.3	0.3	1.0	6.3
Career	5 years, 2 teams	17	11	20.6	42.2	0.0	81.3	4.4	0.6	0.4	0.7	1.1	3.9

=== College ===
Year	Team	GP	GS	MPG	FG%	3P%	FT%	RPG	APG	SPG	BPG	TO	PPG
1994–95	Tennessee	37	-	-	51.2	**25.0**	**74.1**	6.5	0.5	**0.7**	**1.1**	-	9.0
1995–96	Tennessee	35	-	-	48.7	20.0	61.8	6.3	**0.7**	0.5	0.7	-	7.5
1996–97	Tennessee	**38**	-	-	**53.2**	0.0	70.5	**7.4**	0.6	0.6	0.7	-	**10.0**
**Career**		110	-	-	51.1	21.4	69.8	6.7	0.6	0.6	0.8	-	8.9
Statistics retrieved from Sports-Reference.

== Personal life ==
Johnson graduated from the University of Tennessee with a bachelor's degree in criminal justice. She is a cousin of fellow basketball player Ivory Latta. She now coaches youth basketball in the Atlanta area.
