= Michele Van Gorp =

American basketball player (born 1977)

Personal information
- Born: May 10, 1977 (age 49) Mount Clemens, Michigan, U.S.
- Listed height: 6 ft 6 in (1.98 m)
- Listed weight: 187 lb (85 kg)

Career information
- High school: Chippewa Valley (Clinton Charter Township, Michigan)
- College: Purdue (1994–1996); Duke (1997–1999)
- WNBA draft: 1999: 2nd round, 18th overall pick
- Drafted by: New York Liberty
- Playing career: 1999–2004
- Position: Center

Career history
- 1999: New York Liberty
- 2000: Portland Fire
- 2001–2004: Minnesota Lynx

Career highlights
- 2× Third-team All-American – AP (1998, 1999); Kodak All-American (1999); First-team All-ACC (1999)
- Stats at Basketball Reference
Medals
Women's basketball
Representing United States
Jones Cup
Silver medal – second place	1997 Taipei, Taiwan	Team competition

Michele Van Gorp (born May 10, 1977) is an American former professional basketball player in the Women's National Basketball Association (WNBA), most recently with the Minnesota Lynx.

== Early career ==
After attending Chippewa Valley High School in Clinton Township, Michigan, Van Gorp played collegiate basketball at Purdue University during her freshman and sophomore years, but transferred to Duke University alongside Nicole Erickson for her junior and senior years. She was the tallest woman to suit up in a Duke uniform. She led Duke to the school's first NCAA final, which took place in San Jose, and in which the Blue Devils were beaten 62-45 by Purdue. She was inducted to the Duke Athletics Hall of Fame in 2002.

=== Purdue and Duke statistics ===
Legend
GP	Games played	GS	Games started	MPG	Minutes per game
FG%	Field goal percentage	3P%	3-point field goal percentage	FT%	Free throw percentage
RPG	Rebounds per game	APG	Assists per game	SPG	Steals per game
BPG	Blocks per game	PPG	Points per game	**Bold**	Career high

Year	Team	GP	Points	FG%	3P%	FT%	RPG	APG	SPG	BPG	PPG
1994-95	Purdue	25	55	46.9%	0.0%	60.0%	1.8	0.2	0.1	0.2	2.2
1995-96	Purdue	31	226	60.6%	0.0%	68.1%	3.6	0.5	0.3	**1.5**	7.3
Career	Purdue	56	281	57.4%	0.0%	66.1%	2.8	0.4	0.2	0.9	5.0
1997-98	Duke	32	333	56.2%	**31.6%**	**68.4%**	4.1	0.7	0.4	0.7	10.4
1998-99	Duke	**36**	610	**62.0%**	25.0%	60.1%	**5.5**	**1.1**	**0.6**	1.0	**16.9**
Career	Duke	68	943	59.9%	29.6%	63.3%	4.8	0.9	0.5	0.9	13.9

== USA Basketball ==
Van Gorp competed with USA Basketball as a member of the 1997 Jones Cup Team that won the silver medal in Taipei. Several of the games were close, with the USA team winning four games by six points or fewer, including an overtime game in the semifinal match against Japan. The gold medal game against South Korea was also close, but the USA fell 76–71 to claim the silver medal for the event. Van Gorp was the leading scorer in the game against Thailand, with 19 points and averaged 6.3 points per game over the course of the tournament.

== WNBA career ==
The first Duke student athlete to be selected in the WNBA's draft in 1999, she was selected in the second round, being the 18th overall pick. Van Gorp was traded to Portland after her rookie season, where she improved her personal averages and gained confidence in her game. After only one year with the Portland Fire she was traded to the Minnesota Lynx alongside Lynn Pride. With the Lynx, Van Gorp gained recognition as one of the league's toughest defenders and an effective weapon to help "shut down" Margo Dydek.

She missed most of the 2004 season due to a stress fracture in her left foot that occurred during a practice session. Surgeons had to insert a screw into the navicular bone of her foot. Van Gorp's contract with the Lynx had expired after the 2004 WNBA season ended, but she was still too injured to play for the 2005 season.

Van Gorp was one of the first WNBA athletes to disclose to the media that she was in a same-sex relationship during her playing career.

== WNBA career statistics ==
Legend
GP	Games played	GS	Games started	MPG	Minutes per game	RPG	Rebounds per game
APG	Assists per game	SPG	Steals per game	BPG	Blocks per game	PPG	Points per game
TO	Turnovers per game	FG%	Field-goal percentage	3P%	3-point field-goal percentage	FT%	Free-throw percentage
**Bold**	Career best	°	League leader

=== Regular season ===
Year	Team	GP	GS	MPG	FG%	3P%	FT%	RPG	APG	SPG	BPG	TO	PPG
1999	New York	21	0	5.6	.333	.000	**.800**	0.8	0.3	0.0	0.1	0.1	1.0
2000	Portland	28	1	7.1	**.500**	.000	.543	1.5	0.2	0.1	0.1	1.1	2.5
2001	Minnesota	22	8	11.0	.375	.000	.550	1.5	0.5	0.1	0.3	0.8	1.9
2002	Minnesota	22	**13**	16.0	.456	**.286**	.727	2.9	**0.6**	**0.3**	0.5	0.9	4.5
2003	Minnesota	**31**	1	**17.0**	.432	.000	.673	**3.5**	0.5	**0.3**	**0.6**	1.8	**5.6**
2004	Minnesota	8	0	8.3	.474	.000	.500	1.6	0.1	0.0	0.1	0.9	2.8
Career	6 years, 2 teams	132	23	11.4	.436	.200	.627	2.1	0.4	0.2	0.3	1.0	3.2

=== Playoffs ===
Year	Team	GP	GS	MPG	FG%	3P%	FT%	RPG	APG	SPG	BPG	TO	PPG
2003	Minnesota	3	0	10.3	.286	.000	.625	0.3	1.0	0.3	1.0	1.3	3.0
Career	1 year, 1 team	3	0	10.3	.286	.000	.625	0.3	1.0	0.3	1.0	1.3	3.0

== International career ==
Van Gorp also played in Europe for the following teams:

- Panathinaikos (1999)
- Parma (2000)
- CJM Bourges (2000) - Euroleague winner
- Dynamo Moscow (2003)
- Ros Casares Valencia (2004)
- Nantes-Reze (2008)

== After WNBA ==
According to a December 1, 2005, news article from the Minneapolis Star-Tribune, Van Gorp filed a medical malpractice lawsuit in Hennepin County District Court against a member of the Lynx's medical staff and three other parties. The suit named Dr. Joel Boyd, the team's orthopedic surgeon; Dr. Fernando Pena; Fairview-University Medical Center; and Orthopaedic Center as defendants. Van Gorp was reported to be seeking at least $50,000 for negligence and loss of employment.

In June 2007, Colgate University in upstate New York announced that Van Gorp had been appointed as an assistant coach of its women's basketball team..

Van Gorp currently works in recruiting with the Duke Women's Basketball program in Durham, NC, and is also taking business school coursework.
