= Nekeshia Henderson =

American basketball player (born 1973)

Personal information
- Born: February 28, 1973 (age 53) Dallas, Texas, U.S.
- Listed height: 5 ft 8 in (1.73 m)
- Listed weight: 144 lb (65 kg)

Career information
- High school: South Oak Cliff (Dallas, Texas)
- College: Texas (1991–1995)
- Playing career: 1996–present
- Position: Guard
- Number: 6

Career history
- 1996: San Jose Lasers
- 1996: Colorado Xplosion
- 1997: Houston Comets*
- 1998: BK Klosterneuburg
- 1999: Elitzur Holon
- 2000–2001: Houston Comets
- Stats at Basketball Reference
Medals
Representing United States
Jones Cup
Bronze medal – third place	1993 Taipei	Team competition

Nekeshia Shiondrail Henderson (born February 28, 1973) is an American former professional basketball guard who played for the Houston Comets of the Women's National Basketball Association (WNBA). She played college basketball at Texas. She also played for the San Jose Lasers and Colorado Xplosion of the American Basketball League (ABL).

== Early life and college ==
Henderson attended South Oak Cliff High School in Dallas, Texas.

Henderson played for the Texas Longhorns of the University of Texas from 1991 to 1995, playing in 96 games and starting 64. She recorded 12.0 points, 3.9 rebounds, 4.7 assists and 1.9 steals per game during her college career. She earned First Team All-Southwest Conference honors and was named the SWC Freshman of the Year in 1992. Henderson garnered Second Team All-SWC recognition in 1995. She was named the Team MVP for the 1994–95 season. She graduated with a bachelor's degree in applied learning & development.

== Professional career ==
=== American Basketball League ===
Henderson began her professional career in 1996 playing in the American Basketball League. She played six games for the San Jose Lasers before leaving the team. She signed a replacement contract with the Colorado Xplosion in December 1996 and played three more games with them.

=== Houston Comets (first stint) ===
Henderson spent the 1997 season on the Houston Comets' developmental squad as a shooting guard. She never played in an actual game for the team during the season and was released shortly after the 1997 season ended.

=== BK Klosterneuburg and Elitzur Holon ===
Henderson played overseas after her initial release from the Houston Comets in 1997. She participated in the 1997–98 Ronchetti Cup with BK Klosterneuburg, an Austrian team. She also played in the 1998–99 Ronchetti Cup with Elitzur Holon, a team from the Israeli Female Basketball Premier League.

=== Houston Comets (second stint) ===
After playing overseas for a few years, Henderson returned to the WNBA but tore an anterior cruciate ligament in her knee before the start of the 2000 season. Henderson signed with the Comets on May 1, 2000 and spent the entire season on the injured list.

Henderson would finally get her time on the court as an active WNBA player when she played her debut game on May 28, 2001. On that day, the Comets lost their season-opening game to the Los Angeles Sparks in a very close battle 66–63, with Henderson recording 4 rebounds and 3 assists (but no points). Although the Comets lost their first game, they would go on a 9-game win streak from May 31 to June 27 and have a 9–1 record in 10 games. The last half of the team's season was not as successful, as they would lose 12 of their final 22 games and end the season at 19–13. Henderson played in 23 games for the team (winning 14 out of 23 games) and averaged 1.1 points, 0.9 rebounds and 1.0 assists per game. The Comets made the playoffs but were swept in the Western Conference First Round by the Sparks.

Henderson was waived by the Comets on May 22, 2002, 5 days before the 2002 season started. She would not play in the WNBA again after being waived by the Comets. Thus, her final game ever was Game 2 of the aforementioned 2001 first round series against the Sparks on August 20, 2001. The Comets lost the game 70–58 with Henderson only playing for 1 minute and recording no stats.

== National team career ==
Henderson competed with USA Basketball as a member of the 1993 Jones Cup Team that won the Bronze in Taipei.

== Career statistics ==
=== WNBA ===
Legend
GP	Games played	GS	Games started	MPG	Minutes per game	RPG	Rebounds per game
APG	Assists per game	SPG	Steals per game	BPG	Blocks per game	PPG	Points per game
TO	Turnovers per game	FG%	Field-goal percentage	3P%	3-point field-goal percentage	FT%	Free-throw percentage
**Bold**	Career best	°	League leader

==== Regular season ====
WNBA regular season statistics
Year	Team	GP	GS	MPG	FG%	3P%	FT%	RPG	APG	SPG	BPG	TO	PPG
2001	Houston	23	0	7.8	.237	.273	.286	0.9	1.0	0.3	0.0	0.7	1.1
**Career**	1 year, 1 team	23	0	7.8	.237	.273	.286	0.9	1.0	0.3	0.0	0.7	1.1

==== Playoffs ====
WNBA playoff statistics
Year	Team	GP	GS	MPG	FG%	3P%	FT%	RPG	APG	SPG	BPG	TO	PPG
2001	Houston	1	0	1.0	—	—	—	0.0	0.0	0.0	0.0	0.0	0.0
**Career**	1 year, 1 team	1	0	1.0	—	—	—	0.0	0.0	0.0	0.0	0.0	0.0

=== College ===
Year	Team	GP	GS	MPG	FG%	3P%	FT%	RPG	APG	SPG	BPG	TO	PPG
1991–92	Texas	**31**	-	-	40.6	27.3	71.4	3.4	1.3	1.7	0.3	-	10.2
1992–93	Texas	29	-	-	**43.3**	36.6	62.2	3.8	3.7	1.6	0.1	-	10.2
1993–94	Texas	21	-	-	43.0	35.7	64.7	**4.5**	**6.0**	**2.5**	**0.6**	-	13.0
1994–95	Texas	15	-	-	42.2	**40.0**	**71.9**	4.3	5.1	2.1	0.4	-	**17.9**
**Career**		96	-	-	42.2	35.3	67.6	3.9	3.6	1.9	0.3	-	12.0
Statistics retrieved from Sports-Reference.
