= Tynesha Lewis =

American basketball player and coach (born 1979)

UNC Asheville Bulldogs
- Title: Head coach
- League: Big South Conference

Personal information
- Born: May 8, 1979 (age 47) Macclesfield, North Carolina, U.S.
- Listed height: 5 ft 10 in (1.78 m)
- Listed weight: 152 lb (69 kg)

Career information
- High school: Southwest Edgecombe (Pinetops, North Carolina)
- College: NC State (1997–2001)
- WNBA draft: 2001: 2nd round, 31st overall pick
- Drafted by: Houston Comets
- Playing career: 2001–2006
- Position: Guard
- Number: 20, 1
- Coaching career: 2011–present

Career history

Playing
- 2001–2002: Houston Comets
- 2003–2005: Charlotte Sting
- 2005–2006: Minnesota Lynx

Coaching
- 2011–2012: NC State (graduate assistant)
- 2012–2013: Illinois State (assistant)
- 2017–2020: North Carolina Central (assistant)
- 2020–2024: Elizabeth City State
- 2024–present: UNC Asheville

Career highlights
- ACC All-Freshman Team (1998); North Carolina Miss Basketball (1997)
- Stats at WNBA.com
- Stats at Basketball Reference

Tynesha Rashaun Lewis (born May 8, 1979) is an American former professional women's basketball player in the Women's National Basketball Association (WNBA).

Lewis was born in Macclesfield, North Carolina and graduated in 2001 from North Carolina State University. She was the president of the Mu Omicron chapter of her sorority, Delta Sigma Theta.

Following her collegiate career, she was selected the 21st overall pick by the Houston Comets in the 2001 WNBA draft. She also played for the Charlotte Sting and Minnesota Lynx before retiring in 2007.

In 2003, she started her own business, a non-profit organization called Itsdoable, Inc., which features motivational speaking and youth programs.

Lewis has been the head women's basketball coach at Elizabeth City State University since 2021, winning the CIAA tournament in 2023.

In April 2024, Lewis was named the head women's basketball coach at UNC Asheville. Lewis had previously served as the head coach of the Elizabeth City State Vikings Women's basketball team, with a team record of 61–29. They made it to the conference tournament championship game three straight years with one championship. She earned National Sports Media Association’s Clarence “Big House” Gaines coach of the year honors for Division II in 2023.

== WNBA career statistics ==
Legend
GP	Games played	GS	Games started	MPG	Minutes per game	RPG	Rebounds per game
APG	Assists per game	SPG	Steals per game	BPG	Blocks per game	PPG	Points per game
TO	Turnovers per game	FG%	Field-goal percentage	3P%	3-point field-goal percentage	FT%	Free-throw percentage
**Bold**	Career best	°	League leader

=== Regular season ===
Year	Team	GP	GS	MPG	FG%	3P%	FT%	RPG	APG	SPG	BPG	TO	PPG
2001	Houston	29	**4**	14.4	.424	.400	.647	**2.1**	0.5	0.4	0.1	0.9	3.3
2002	Houston	17	1	8.5	**.433**	.375	.625	1.1	0.5	0.2	0.2	0.5	2.0
2003	Charlotte	23	0	10.2	.419	**.538**	**.917**	1.4	0.9	0.4	**0.3**	0.7	3.0
2004	Charlotte	**34**	2	**18.1**	**.433**	.400	.759	1.7	**1.3**	**0.8**	0.2	1.3	**7.2**
2005	Charlotte	10	1	16.6	.311	.083	.500	2.0	**1.3**	0.3	**0.3**	1.1	4.7
2005	Minnesota	11	0	8.2	.370	.333	.778	0.5	0.6	0.3	0.1	1.0	2.5
2006	Minnesota	19	0	10.6	.345	.091	.700	1.4	0.9	0.6	0.3	0.8	2.4
Career	6 years, 3 teams	143	8	13.1	.404	.350	.715	1.5	0.9	0.5	0.2	0.9	4.0

=== Playoffs ===
Year	Team	GP	GS	MPG	FG%	3P%	FT%	RPG	APG	SPG	BPG	TO	PPG
2001	Houston	**2**	0	3.0	.000	.000	.000	0.0	1.0	0.0	0.0	0.0	0.0
2003	Charlotte	**2**	0	**14.5**	**.500**	**1.000**	**.833**	**1.5**	**2.0**	0.0	**0.5**	0.0	**7.0**
Career	2 years, 2 teams	4	0	8.8	.444	1.000	.833	0.8	1.5	0.0	0.3	0.0	3.5

== NC State statistics ==
Legend
GP	Games played	GS	Games started	MPG	Minutes per game
FG%	Field goal percentage	3P%	3-point field goal percentage	FT%	Free throw percentage
RPG	Rebounds per game	APG	Assists per game	SPG	Steals per game
BPG	Blocks per game	PPG	Points per game	**Bold**	Career high

Year	Team	GP	Points	FG%	3P%	FT%	RPG	APG	SPG	BPG	PPG
1997–98	NC State	32	376	**45.5%**	**32.0%**	65.9%	4.0	2.5	1.0	0.4	11.8
1998–99	NC State	29	**480**	43.1%	30.3%	71.2%	**6.8**	**3.2**	1.1	0.1	**16.6**
1999-00	NC State	29	318	36.1%	31.6%	56.7%	5.1	2.4	**1.6**	0.3	11.0
2000–01	NC State	**33**	447	38.9%	29.4%	**74.4%**	5.5	3.1	**1.6**	**0.5**	13.5
Total		123	1621	40.9%	30.9%	68.9%	5.3	2.8	1.3	0.4	13.2
