= Danielle McCulley =

American basketball player (born 1975)

Personal information
- Born: January 18, 1975 (age 51)
- Listed height: 6 ft 3 in (1.91 m)
- Listed weight: 180 lb (82 kg)

Career information
- College: Purdue; Western Kentucky
- Playing career: 1998–2003
- Position: Center

Career highlights
- 2x All-Sun Belt (1997, 1998)
- Stats at Basketball Reference
Medals
Women's basketball
Representing United States
Pan American Games
Bronze medal – third place	1999 Winnipeg	Team

Danielle McCulley (born January 18, 1975) is a former professional basketball player for the Indiana Fever between 2000 and 2002 and Seattle Storm between 2002 and 2004 in the Women's National Basketball Association.

== NCAA career ==
She played college basketball for Purdue Boilermakers between 1993 and 1995 and Western Kentucky Hilltoppers between 1996 and 1998.

== College career statistics ==
Year	Team	GP	GS	MPG	FG%	3P%	FT%	RPG	APG	SPG	BPG	TO	PPG
1993–94	Purdue	33	-	-	42.9	31.3	73.6	4.2	0.5	0.7	0.5	-	6.1
1994–95	Purdue	32	-	-	40.9	31.8	73.1	6.3	1.2	1.5	1.2	-	9.6
1995–96	Western Kentucky	Sat out due to NCAA Transfer Rules											
1996–97	Western Kentucky	31	-	-	43.9	20.0	75.8	8.7	2.9	1.9	0.7	-	12.8
1997–98	Western Kentucky	35	-	-	46.7	41.3	71.8	8.1	2.4	1.7	0.8	-	15.2
Career		131	-	-	44.0	32.5	73.3	6.8	1.7	1.4	0.8	-	11.0
Statistics retrieved from Sports-Reference.

== USA Basketball ==
McCulley participated on the USA team as part of the 1999 Pan American Games in Winnipeg, Canada. The team went 4–3 and earned a bronze medal. McCulley averaged 7.5 points per game.

== Professional career ==
=== ABL ===
She played for Portland Power in the American Basketball League in 1998–99 season.

=== WNBA ===
Legend
GP	Games played	GS	Games started	MPG	Minutes per game	RPG	Rebounds per game
APG	Assists per game	SPG	Steals per game	BPG	Blocks per game	PPG	Points per game
TO	Turnovers per game	FG%	Field-goal percentage	3P%	3-point field-goal percentage	FT%	Free-throw percentage
**Bold**	Career best	°	League leader

Year	Team	GP	GS	MPG	FG%	3P%	FT%	RPG	APG	SPG	BPG	TO	PPG
2000	Indiana	**29**	**2**	**15.7**	**.412**	.176	.730	**2.8**	**0.7**	**0.6**	**0.8**	1.3	**6.0**
2001	Indiana	8	**2**	11.3	.278	**.500**	.944	2.1	0.6	0.0	0.3	0.9	3.5
2002	Seattle	4	1	10.8	.000	.000	**1.000**	1.8	0.3	0.3	0.0	**0.5**	0.5
2003	Seattle	7	0	3.7	.167	.000	–	0.1	0.0	0.0	0.0	0.6	0.3
Career	4 years, 2 teams	48	5	12.8	.365	.174	.783	2.2	0.5	0.4	0.5	1.0	4.3

=== European career ===
She also played for Apollon from Greece for 1999–00, Beşiktaş Istanbul from Turkey for 2000–01 season and also played for Fenerbahçe Istanbul from Turkey (won the Turkish Women's Basketball League) for 2001-02 and Ramat HaSharon from Israel for 2002–03.
