= 2000 Portland Fire season =

- Head coach: Linda Hargrove
- Arena: Rose Garden

Results
- Record: 10–22 (.313)
- Place: 7th (Western)
- Playoff finish: Did not qualify

The 2000 WNBA season was the 1st season for the Portland Fire.

== Transactions ==
=== WNBA expansion draft ===
Player	Nationality	Former WNBA Team
Alisa Burras	United States	Cleveland Rockers
Sophia Witherspoon	United States	Houston Comets
Tari Phillips	United States	Orlando Miracle
Coquese Washington	United States	New York Liberty
Molly Goodenbour	United States	Sacramento Monarchs
Jamila Wideman	United States	Cleveland Rockers

=== WNBA draft ===
Round	Pick	Player	Nationality	School/Team/Country
1	7	Lynn Pride	United States	Kansas
2	23	Stacey Thomas	United States	Michigan
3	39	Maxann Reese	United States	Michigan State
4	55	Rhonda Smith	United States	Long Beach State

=== Transactions ===
Date	Transaction
December 15, 1999	Drafted Alisa Burras, Sophia Witherspoon, Tari Phillips, Coquese Washington, Molly Goodenbour and Jamila Wideman in the WNBA expansion draft
January 28, 2000	Traded Coquese Washington to the Houston Comets in exchange for Mila Nikolich
April 25, 2000	Drafted Lynn Pride, Stacey Thomas, Maxann Reese and Rhonda Smith in the 2000 WNBA draft
May 28, 2000	Traded Tari Phillips to the New York Liberty in exchange for Carolyn Jones-Young
May 30, 2000	Waived Maxann Reese and Nadine Domond

== Roster ==
2000 Portland Fire roster
Players
Coaches

Pos.	No.	Nat.	Name	Height	Weight	DOB	From	Yrs
G	4	(Australia)	Bevilaqua, Tully	5' 7" (1.7m)	145 lb (66kg)	1972-07-19		1
C	41	(United States)	Burras, Alisa	6' 3" (1.91m)	218 lb (99kg)	1975-06-23	Louisiana Tech	1
F	0	(United States)	Crawley, Sylvia	6' 5" (1.96m)	187 lb (85kg)	1972-09-27	North Carolina	R
G	3	(United States)	Marciniak, Michelle	5' 10" (1.78m)	154 lb (70kg)	1973-10-29	Tennessee	R
F	17	(United States)	Nygaard, Vanessa	6' 1" (1.85m)	175 lb (79kg)	1975-03-13	Stanford	1
G/F	34	(United States)	Pride, Lynn	6' 2" (1.88m)	180 lb (82kg)	1978-10-16	Kansas	R
F	11	(United States)	Thomas, Stacey	5' 10" (1.78m)	154 lb (70kg)	1978-08-29	Michigan	R
C	31	(United States)	Van Gorp, Michele	6' 6" (1.98m)	187 lb (85kg)	1977-05-10	Duke	1
F	22	(United States)	Walker, DeMya	6' 3" (1.91m)	191 lb (87kg)	1977-11-28	Virginia	R
G	10	(United States)	Wideman, Jamila	5' 6" (1.68m)	135 lb (61kg)	1975-10-16	Stanford	3
G	7	(United States)	Williams, Tara	5' 11" (1.8m)	170 lb (77kg)	1974-07-23	Auburn	1
G	13	(United States)	Witherspoon, Sophia	5' 10" (1.78m)	145 lb (66kg)	1969-07-06	Florida	3

Head coach
(United States) Linda Hargrove (Southwestern (KS))

Legend

- (C) Team captain
- (DP) Unsigned draft pick
- (FA) Free agent
- (S) Suspended
- Injured

== Schedule ==
=== Regular season ===
2000 game log
Total: 10–22 (Home: 6–10; Road: 4–12)
May: 0–1 (Home: 0–1; Road: 0–0)

Game	Date	Team	Score	High points	High rebounds	High assists	Location Attendance	Record
1	May 31	Houston	L 89-93 (2OT)	Burras; Witherspoon (19)	Vanessa Nygaard (11)	Stacey Thomas (6)	Rose Garden	0–1

June: 3–8 (Home: 2–4; Road: 1–4)

Game	Date	Team	Score	High points	High rebounds	High assists	Location Attendance	Record
2	June 3	@ Seattle	W 65-58	Sylvia Crawley (18)	Tully Bevilaqua (8)	Tully Bevilaqua (4)	KeyArena	1–1
3	June 6	@ Los Angeles	L 57-70	Sophia Witherspoon (12)	Sylvia Crawley (7)	Marciniak; Pride (2)	Great Western Forum	1–2
4	June 8	Utah	L 72-81	Sylvia Crawley (25)	Vanessa Nygaard (8)	Bevilaqua; Pride (3)	Rose Garden	1–3
5	June 13	Phoenix	L 69-75	Sophia Witherspoon (19)	Burras; Thomas; Walker; Witherspoon (4)	Tully Bevilaqua (6)	Rose Garden	1–4
6	June 13	@ Phoenix	L 80-81 (OT)	Sophia Witherspoon (22)	Alisa Burras (9)	Stacey Thomas (4)	America West Arena	1–5
7	June 17	Los Angeles	L 81-94	Sylvia Crawley (17)	Crawley; Nygaard (5)	Nygaard; Witherspoon (4)	Rose Garden	1–6
8	June 20	Charlotte	L 85-87 (OT)	Sophia Witherspoon (23)	Sylvia Crawley (7)	Sophia Witherspoon (7)	Rose Garden	1–7
9	June 23	Seattle	W 72-61	Sylvia Crawley (20)	Sylvia Crawley (11)	Stacey Thomas (6)	Rose Garden	2–7
10	June 25	@ Sacramento	L 76-92	Sophia Witherspoon (17)	Alisa Burras (7)	Bevilaqua; Pride (4)	ARCO Arena	2–8
11	June 28	Cleveland	W 80-69	Burras; Witherspoon (22)	Alisa Burras (7)	Tully Bevilaqua (8)	Rose Garden	3–8
12	June 30	@ Houston	L 39-79	Alisa Burras (9)	Vanessa Nygaard (5)	Bevilaqua; Crawley; Marciniak; Nygaard; Thomas (2)	Compaq Center	3–9

July: 6–9 (Home: 3–3; Road: 3–6)

Game	Date	Team	Score	High points	High rebounds	High assists	Location Attendance	Record
13	July 2	@ Minnesota	L 75-81	Sophia Witherspoon (31)	Stacey Thomas (8)	Pride; Thomas; Witherspoon (4)	Target Center	3–10
14	July 3	@ Indiana	W 68-64	Sophia Witherspoon (20)	Sylvia Crawley (9)	Michelle Marciniak (3)	Conseco Fieldhouse	4–10
15	July 5	@ New York	L 45-62	Sophia Witherspoon (9)	Sylvia Crawley (9)	Bevilaqua; Marciniak (2)	Madison Square Garden	4–11
16	July 7	Sacramento	L 60-63	Sylvia Crawley (16)	Sylvia Crawley (8)	Stacey Thomas (6)	Rose Garden	4–12
17	July 9	Washington	W 75-58	Sophia Witherspoon (26)	Sylvia Crawley (5)	DeMya Walker (5)	Rose Garden	5–12
18	July 11	@ Los Angeles	W 80-77	Sophia Witherspoon (29)	Marciniak; Thomas; Van Gorp (5)	Thomas; Witherspoon (3)	Great Western Forum	6–12
19	July 12	@ Utah	L 67-76	Sophia Witherspoon (19)	Sylvia Crawley (7)	Marciniak; Thomas (2)	Delta Center	6–13
20	July 14	Minnesota	W 65-54	Sylvia Crawley (14)	Sylvia Crawley (10)	Stacey Thomas (8)	Rose Garden	7–13
21	July 19	@ Miami	L 62-69	DeMya Walker (12)	Stacey Thomas (6)	Michelle Marciniak (4)	American Airlines Arena	7–14
22	July 21	@ Charlotte	L 64-73	Sophia Witherspoon (25)	Vanessa Nygaard (10)	Stacey Thomas (5)	Charlotte Coliseum	7–15
23	July 23	@ Minnesota	L 63-80	Stacey Thomas (14)	Crawley; Thomas (7)	Stacey Thomas (6)	Target Center	7–16
24	July 24	@ Detroit	W 61-57	Sophia Witherspoon (18)	Sylvia Crawley (9)	Stacey Thomas (4)	The Palace of Auburn Hills	8–16
25	July 26	Sacramento	L 70-73	Sophia Witherspoon (22)	Sylvia Crawley (10)	Tully Bevilaqua (7)	Rose Garden	8–17
26	July 28	Indiana	L 58-73	Vanessa Nygaard (17)	Vanessa Nygaard (9)	Sylvia Crawley (3)	Rose Garden	8–18
27	July 30	Orlando	W 76-55	Sophia Witherspoon (27)	Stacey Thomas (8)	Stacey Thomas (9)	Rose Garden	9–18

August: 1–4 (Home: 1–2; Road: 0–2)

Game	Date	Team	Score	High points	High rebounds	High assists	Location Attendance	Record
28	August 1	Miami	W 54-50	Sophia Witherspoon (24)	Marciniak; Witherspoon (4)	Marciniak; Thomas; Witherspoon (2)	Rose Garden	10–18
29	August 4	Houston	L 56-81	Sophia Witherspoon (17)	Sophia Witherspoon (5)	Bevilaqua; Witherspoon (3)	Rose Garden	10–19
30	August 6	@ Seattle	L 58-66 (OT)	Vanessa Nygaard (14)	Crawley; Nygaard (7)	Bevilaqua; Marciniak (3)	KeyArena	10–20
31	August 7	@ Utah	L 73-83	Michele Van Gorp (16)	Van Gorp; Walker (6)	Bevilaqua; Pride; Thomas (3)	Delta Center	10–21
32	August 9	Phoenix	L 60-68	Vanessa Nygaard (14)	Sylvia Crawley (7)	Tully Bevilaqua (7)	Rose Garden	10–22

=== Season standings ===
Western Conference	W	L	PCT	Conf.	GB
Los Angeles Sparks ^{x}	28	4	.875	17–4	–
Houston Comets ^{x}	27	5	.844	17–4	1.0
Sacramento Monarchs ^{x}	21	11	.656	13–8	7.0
Phoenix Mercury ^{x}	20	12	.625	11–10	8.0
Utah Starzz ^{o}	18	14	.563	13–8	10.0
Minnesota Lynx ^{o}	15	17	.469	5–16	13.0
Portland Fire ^{o}	10	22	.313	4–17	18.0
Seattle Storm ^{o}	6	26	.188	4–17	22.0

== Statistics ==
Legend
GP	Games played	GS	Games started	MPG	Minutes per game	RPG	Rebounds per game
APG	Assists per game	SPG	Steals per game	BPG	Blocks per game	PPG	Points per game
FG%	Field-goal percentage	3P%	3-point field-goal percentage	FT%	Free-throw percentage	TO	Turnovers per game
PF	Fouls per game		Team leader		League leader

=== Regular season ===
Player	GP	GS	MPG	FG%	3P%	FT%	RPG	APG	SPG	BPG	PPG
Sophia Witherspoon	32	32	33.2	.384	.368	.871	3.3	2.1	1.2	0.3	16.8
Sylvia Crawley	31	30	30.0	.480	.000	.696	6.0	1.1	0.9	0.8	11.5
Stacey Thomas	32	31	27.0	.356	.250	.595	3.9	3.2	1.7	0.5	5.1
Vanessa Nygaard	32	28	26.3	.435	.333	.759	3.8	0.9	0.5	0.2	7.9
Tully Bevilaqua	32	32	24.9	.357	.283	.778	3.0	2.8	1.3	0.2	4.8
Michelle Marciniak	32	0	16.8	.377	.333	.573	1.8	2.3	1.2	0.2	5.5
Alisa Burras	21	4	15.0	.587	N/A	.756	3.5	0.3	0.1	0.3	7.6
Lynn Pride	32	1	14.4	.347	.333	.690	1.9	1.3	0.5	0.3	3.6
DeMya Walker	30	1	10.4	.398	.000	.468	1.6	0.6	0.6	0.2	3.1
Michele Van Gorp	28	1	7.1	.500	N/A	.543	1.5	0.2	0.1	0.1	2.5
Jamila Wideman	5	0	7.0	.000	N/A	N/A	0.8	0.4	0.4	0.0	0.0
Tara Williams	26	0	6.7	.449	.341	.500	0.7	0.5	0.3	0.1	3.1

^{‡}Waived/Released during the season
^{†}Traded during the season
^{≠}Acquired during the season
