= Monica Maxwell =

American basketball player and coach (born 1976)

Personal information
- Born: December 21, 1976 (age 49) Hammond, Indiana, U.S.
- Listed height: 5 ft 9 in (1.75 m)
- Listed weight: 162 lb (73 kg)

Career information
- High school: Central (East Chicago, Indiana)
- College: Louisiana Tech (1995–1999)
- WNBA draft: 1999: undrafted
- Playing career: 1999–2002
- Position: Small forward

Career history
- 1999: Washington Mystics
- 2000–2002: Indiana Fever

Career highlights
- Sun Belt Tournament MVP (1999); 2× First Team All-Sun Belt (1997, 1998); Sun Belt Freshman of the Year (1996)
- Stats at WNBA.com
- Stats at Basketball Reference
Medals
Women's basketball
Representing United States
Jones Cup
Silver medal – second place	1997 Jones Cup Taipei, Taiwan	Team competition

Monica Lynn Maxwell (born December 21, 1976) is a former women's basketball player and coach.

== Playing career ==
Maxwell played her high school basketball at East Chicago Central High School, leading the Lady Cardinals to a 22–1 record during her senior season in 1995 and was a finalist for the Naismith Award recognizing the top prep player in the nation. She played for the Louisiana Tech Lady Techsters basketball team from 1995 to 1999. Maxwell ended her career at LA Tech ranked fourth on the school's all-time career three-point field goals list and third in three-point field goals attempted. She played in two NCAA Final Fours with the Lady Techsters. Maxwell graduated from Louisiana Tech University in 1999 with a degree in computer information systems. Maxwell played her rookie season in the WNBA with the Washington Mystics. She played her final three seasons with the Indiana Fever. In 2000, Maxwell led the Eastern Conference with 62 three-pointers made. She also set a then-franchise record with 29 points against the Los Angeles Sparks on June 22, 2000. In the off-season, Maxwell played for the WNBL's Springfield Spirit.

== Career statistics ==
Legend
GP	Games played	GS	Games started	MPG	Minutes per game	RPG	Rebounds per game
APG	Assists per game	SPG	Steals per game	BPG	Blocks per game	PPG	Points per game
TO	Turnovers per game	FG%	Field-goal percentage	3P%	3-point field-goal percentage	FT%	Free-throw percentage
**Bold**	Career best	°	League leader

=== WNBA ===
==== Regular season ====
Year	Team	GP	GS	MPG	FG%	3P%	FT%	RPG	APG	SPG	BPG	TO	PPG
1999	Washington	20	0	7.1	22.0	21.2	55.6	1.1	0.5	0.3	0.1	0.6	1.7
2000	Indiana	**32**	**32**	**32.2**	**38.6**	**39.7**	86.2	**5.0**	**2.0**	**1.5**	**0.5**	2.0	**10.4**
2001	Indiana	15	3	15.9	30.2	22.6	66.7	2.5	0.9	0.3	0.3	1.5	3.1
2002	Indiana	18	0	9.4	29.8	29.4	**100.0**	1.7	0.4	0.4	0.2	**0.3**	1.9
Career	4 years, 2 teams	85	35	18.6	34.7	34.2	80.2	3.0	1.1	0.8	0.3	1.2	5.3

==== Playoffs ====
Year	Team	GP	GS	MPG	FG%	3P%	FT%	RPG	APG	SPG	BPG	TO	PPG
2002	Indiana	2	0	4.0	0.0	0.0	0.0	0.0	0.5	0.0	0.0	0.0	0.0
Career	1 year, 1 team	2	0	4.0	0.0	0.0	0.0	0.0	0.5	0.0	0.0	0.0	0.0

=== College ===
Year	Team	GP	GS	MPG	FG%	3P%	FT%	RPG	APG	SPG	BPG	TO	PPG
1995–96	Louisiana Tech	33	-	-	40.5	0.0	65.8	5.8	1.2	0.9	0.6	-	7.9
1996–97	Louisiana Tech	**35**	-	-	41.8	25.9	75.0	**6.8**	**2.8**	**1.8**	**0.7**	-	11.7
1997–98	Louisiana Tech	**35**	-	-	**42.7**	**39.2**	**78.5**	6.4	2.4	1.3	**0.7**	-	**11.9**
1998–99	Louisiana Tech	33	-	-	40.6	**39.2**	69.0	6.2	1.9	1.5	0.5	-	9.8
**Career**		136	-	-	41.5	36.1	72.7	6.3	2.1	1.4	0.6	-	10.4
Statistics retrieved from Sports-Reference.

== USA Basketball ==
Maxwell competed with USA Basketball as a member of the 1997 Jones Cup Team that won the silver medal in Taipei. Several of the games were close, with the USA team winning four games by six points or fewer, including an overtime game in the semifinal match against Japan. The gold medal game against South Korea was also close, but the USA fell 76–71 to claim the silver medal for the event. Maxwell averaged 5.3 points per game.

== Coaching career ==
Maxwell served as an assistant coach at Pike High School in Indianapolis, Indiana from 2002 to 2005. She went on to serve as a women's basketball assistant coach at Tulane University from 2005 to 2006.
