= 2000 Indiana Fever season =

1st season in the WNBA

- Head coach: Anne Donovan
- Arena: Conseco Fieldhouse

Results
- Record: 9–23 (.281)
- Place: 7th (Eastern)
- Playoff finish: Did not qualify

The 2000 Indiana Fever season was the franchise's 1st season in the WNBA and their 1st season under head coach, Anne Donovan.

== Transactions ==
=== WNBA expansion draft ===
Player	Nationality	Former WNBA Team
Gordana Grubin	Yugoslavia	Los Angeles Sparks
Stephanie McCarty	United States	Charlotte Sting
Nyree Roberts	United States	Washington Mystics
Rita Williams	United States	Washington Mystics
Kara Wolters	United States	Houston Comets
Chantel Tremitiere	United States	Utah Starzz

=== WNBA draft ===
Round	Pick	Player	Nationality	School/Team/Country
2	26	Jurgita Štreimikytė	Soviet Union	Pool Comense (Italy)
3	42	Usha Gilmore	United States	Rutgers
4	50	Latina Davis	United States	Tennessee
4	58	Renee Robinson	United States	Virginia

=== Transactions ===
Date	Transaction
October 20, 1999	Hired Anne Donovan as Interim Head Coach
December 15, 1999	Drafted Gordana Grubin, Stephanie McCarty, Nyree Roberts, Rita Williams, Kara Wolters and Chantel Tremitiere in the WNBA expansion draft
April 25, 2000	Drafted Jurgita Štreimikytė, Usha Gilmore, Latina Davis and Renee Robinson in the 2000 WNBA draft
April 25, 2000	Traded Latina Davis and Renee Robinson to the Houston Comets in exchange for Latavia Coleman
June 7, 2000	Signed Alessandra Santos de Oliveira
June 7, 2000	Waived Beverly Williams

== Roster ==
2000 Indiana Fever roster
Players
Coaches

Pos.	No.	Nat.	Name	Height	Weight	DOB	From	Yrs
C	12	(United States)	Gaither, Katryna	6' 3" (1.91m)	170 lb (77kg)	1975-08-13	Notre Dame	R
G	33	(United States)	Gilmore, Usha	5' 11" (1.8m)		1978-08-24	Rutgers	R
G	10	(Socialist Federal Republic of Yugoslavia)	Grubin, Gordana	5' 11" (1.8m)	165 lb (75kg)	1972-08-20		1
F	50	(United States)	Harrington, Donna	6' 3" (1.91m)		1966-09-29	Old Dominion	R
F	21	(United States)	Maxwell, Monica	5' 9" (1.75m)	162 lb (73kg)	1976-12-21	Louisiana Tech	1
G/F	22	(United States)	McCarty, Stephanie	5' 9" (1.75m)		1977-06-20	Purdue	1
F/C	5	(United States)	McCulley, Danielle	6' 3" (1.91m)	175 lb (79kg)	1975-01-18	Western Kentucky	R
F	11	(United States)	Quinney, Texlin	6' 4" (1.93m)	165 lb (75kg)	1974-09-07	Seton Hall	R
C	13	(Brazil)	Santos de Oliveira, Alessandra	6' 5" (1.96m)	181 lb (82kg)	1973-12-02		2
F	7	(Soviet Union)	Štreimikytė, Jurgita	6' 2" (1.88m)	165 lb (75kg)	1974-05-14		R
F	43	(United States)	Thompson, Alicia	6' 1" (1.85m)	180 lb (82kg)	1976-06-30	Texas Tech	1
G	3	(United States)	Tremitiere, Chantel	5' 6" (1.68m)	142 lb (64kg)	1969-10-20	Auburn	3
G	4	(United States)	Williams, Beverly	5' 9" (1.75m)		1965-11-09	Texas	R
G	23	(United States)	Williams, Rita	5' 6" (1.68m)	135 lb (61kg)	1976-01-14	Connecticut	2
C	52	(United States)	Wolters, Kara	6' 7" (2.01m)	227 lb (103kg)	1975-08-15	Connecticut	1

Head coach
(United States) Anne Donovan (Old Dominion)
Assistant coaches
(United States) Shelley Patterson
(United States) Julie Plank

Legend

- (C) Team captain
- (DP) Unsigned draft pick
- (FA) Free agent
- (S) Suspended
- Injured

== Schedule ==
=== Regular season ===
2000 game log
Total: 9–23 (Home: 5–11; Road: 4–12)
June: 3–10 (Home: 1–6; Road: 2–4)

Game	Date	Team	Score	High points	High rebounds	High assists	Location Attendance	Record
1	June 1	@ Miami	W 57-54	Alicia Thompson (13)	Stephanie McCarty (8)	Stephanie McCarty (4)	American Airlines Arena	1–0
2	June 3	Orlando	L 82-88	Alicia Thompson (22)	Alicia Thompson (15)	Monica Maxwell (6)	Conseco Fieldhouse	1–1
3	June 5	Miami	W 80-59	Kara Wolters (24)	Alicia Thompson (7)	Stephanie McCarty (4)	Conseco Fieldhouse	2–1
4	June 9	@ Detroit	L 76-80	Stephanie McCarty (20)	Alicia Thompson (9)	Rita Williams (4)	The Palace of Auburn Hills	2–2
5	June 10	New York	L 62-70	Stephanie McCarty (15)	Kara Wolters (9)	Stephanie McCarty (8)	Conseco Fieldhouse	2–3
6	June 12	Cleveland	L 70-83	Kara Wolters (17)	McCulley; Wolters (5)	Monica Maxwell (5)	Conseco Fieldhouse	2–4
7	June 17	@ Orlando	W 79-54	Alicia Thompson (17)	Grubin; Thompson; Williams (5)	McCarty; McCulley; Williams (3)	TD Waterhouse Centre	3–4
8	June 18	@ Detroit	L 74-111	Gordana Grubin (19)	Grubin; Thompson (7)	Grubin; McCarty (2)	The Palace of Auburn Hills	3–5
9	June 21	Sacramento	L 58-70	Jurgita Štreimikytė (15)	Maxwell; Štreimikytė (6)	McCarty; Williams (4)	Conseco Fieldhouse	3–6
10	June 23	New York	L 60-69	Monica Maxwell (15)	Monica Maxwell (8)	Jurgita Štreimikytė (4)	Conseco Fieldhouse	3–7
11	June 24	@ Houston	L 67-93	Kara Wolters (18)	Kara Wolters (10)	Rita Williams (7)	Compaq Center	3–8
12	June 28	Los Angeles	L 73-82	Monica Maxwell (29)	Maxwell; Wolters (7)	Grubin; Štreimikytė; Williams; Wolters (2)	Conseco Fieldhouse	3–9
13	June 30	@ New York	L 70-72	Kara Wolters (16)	Maxwell; Williams; Wolters (4)	Rita Williams (5)	Madison Square Garden	3–10

July: 4–9 (Home: 2–3; Road: 2–6)

Game	Date	Team	Score	High points	High rebounds	High assists	Location Attendance	Record
14	July 1	Miami	L 52-54	Danielle McCulley (17)	Danielle McCulley (6)	Jurgita Štreimikytė (4)	Conseco Fieldhouse	3–11
15	July 3	Portland	L 64-68	Monica Maxwell (20)	Rita Williams (7)	Rita Williams (6)	Conseco Fieldhouse	3–12
16	July 6	@ Orlando	L 60-72	Kara Wolters (16)	Kara Wolters (10)	Štreimikytė; Williams (3)	TD Waterhouse Centre	3–13
17	July 8	Phoenix	L 65-66	Grubin; Maxwell (20)	Monica Maxwell (8)	Rita Williams (5)	Conseco Fieldhouse	3–14
18	July 12	@ Washington	W 81-58	Rita Williams (17)	Alicia Thompson (6)	Chantel Tremitiere (5)	MCI Center	4–14
19	July 14	Seattle	W 64-45	Stephanie McCarty (16)	Monica Maxwell (9)	Chantel Tremitiere (4)	Conseco Fieldhouse	5–14
20	July 15	@ Cleveland	L 55-79	Danielle McCulley (17)	McCulley; Štreimikytė; Thompson (3)	Rita Williams (4)	Gund Arena	5–15
21	July 20	@ Washington	L 74-85	Alicia Thompson (18)	Alicia Thompson (9)	Rita Williams (4)	MCI Center	5–16
22	July 22	Charlotte	W 80-59	Gordana Grubin (19)	Monica Maxwell (10)	Alicia Thompson (5)	Conseco Fieldhouse	6–16
23	July 24	@ Charlotte	L 78-82	Rita Williams (21)	Monica Maxwell (9)	Štreimikytė; Williams (4)	Charlotte Coliseum	6–17
24	July 26	@ Phoenix	L 65-79	Kara Wolters (18)	Alicia Thompson (9)	Gordana Grubin (4)	America West Arena	6–18
25	July 28	@ Portland	W 73-58	Kara Wolters (14)	Monica Maxwell (6)	Monica Maxwell (7)	Rose Garden	7–18
26	July 29	@ Utah	L 71-79	Alicia Thompson (18)	Alicia Thompson (8)	Rita Williams (5)	Delta Center	7–19

August: 2–4 (Home: 2–2; Road: 0–2)

Game	Date	Team	Score	High points	High rebounds	High assists	Location Attendance	Record
27	August 1	@ Seattle	L 60-66	Grubin; Williams; Wolters (15)	Kara Wolters (9)	Rita Williams (6)	KeyArena	7–20
28	August 3	Washington	L 71-75	Rita Williams (19)	Kara Wolters (8)	Grubin; Williams (5)	Conseco Fieldhouse	7–21
29	August 4	Cleveland	W 87-75	Alicia Thompson (18)	Kara Wolters (9)	Rita Williams (7)	Conseco Fieldhouse	8–21
30	August 6	@ Minnesota	L 75-80	Williams; Wolters (16)	Alicia Thompson (7)	Alicia Thompson (6)	Target Center	8–22
31	August 7	Detroit	L 63-74	Williams; Wolters (14)	Kara Wolters (10)	Rita Williams (5)	Conseco Fieldhouse	8–23
32	August 9	Charlotte	W 67-51	Alicia Thompson (15)	Monica Maxwell (8)	Gordana Grubin (6)	Conseco Fieldhouse	9–23

=== Season standings ===
Eastern Conference	W	L	PCT	Conf.	GB
New York Liberty ^{x}	20	12	.625	14–7	–
Cleveland Rockers ^{x}	17	15	.531	13–8	3.0
Orlando Miracle ^{x}	16	16	.500	13–8	4.0
Washington Mystics ^{x}	14	18	.438	13–8	6.0
Detroit Shock ^{o}	14	18	.438	10–11	6.0
Miami Sol ^{o}	13	19	.406	9–12	7.0
Indiana Fever ^{o}	9	23	.281	7–14	11.0
Charlotte Sting ^{o}	8	24	.250	5–16	12.0

== Statistics ==
Legend
GP	Games played	GS	Games started	MPG	Minutes per game	RPG	Rebounds per game
APG	Assists per game	SPG	Steals per game	BPG	Blocks per game	PPG	Points per game
FG%	Field-goal percentage	3P%	3-point field-goal percentage	FT%	Free-throw percentage	TO	Turnovers per game
PF	Fouls per game		Team leader		League leader

=== Regular season ===
Player	GP	GS	MPG	FG%	3P%	FT%	RPG	APG	SPG	BPG	PPG
Monica Maxwell	32	32	32.2	.386	.397	.862	5.0	2.0	1.5	0.5	10.4
Rita Williams	32	29	31.7	.409	.374	.731	3.0	3.2	2.4	0.1	11.0
Kara Wolters	31	30	25.6	.561	N/A	.740	5.3	1.3	0.4	1.6	11.9
Alicia Thompson	31	26	25.5	.514	.450	.714	5.1	1.3	0.8	0.1	10.0
Gordana Grubin	29	20	24.8	.377	.308	.775	2.6	2.2	1.1	0.0	8.2
Stephanie McCarty	32	12	19.8	.398	.386	.826	1.9	1.8	1.0	0.2	7.2
Danielle McCulley	29	2	15.7	.412	.176	.730	2.8	0.7	0.6	0.8	6.0
Jurgita Štreimikytė	27	6	15.7	.393	.333	.771	2.6	1.6	0.6	0.9	4.5
Chantel Tremitiere	25	3	12.7	.353	.444	.625	1.2	2.0	0.4	0.0	2.0
Donna Harrington	8	0	8.4	.167	N/A	.600	1.1	0.6	0.3	0.1	1.0
Texlin Quinney	17	0	6.9	.429	N/A	.600	0.9	0.9	0.2	0.0	0.9
Usha Gilmore	4	0	5.3	.200	.000	N/A	1.3	0.5	0.0	0.0	0.5
Katryna Gaither	6	0	4.0	.375	N/A	N/A	0.5	0.2	0.0	0.2	1.0
Alessandra Santos de Oliveira	3	0	3.7	1.000	N/A	.167	1.0	0.0	0.0	0.0	1.0
Beverly Williams	1	0	3.0	N/A	N/A	N/A	0.0	0.0	0.0	0.0	0.0

^{‡}Waived/Released during the season
^{†}Traded during the season
^{≠}Acquired during the season
