= Vanessa Nygaard =

American basketball player and coach (born 1975)

UC San Diego Tritons
- Title: Associate head coach
- League: Big West

Personal information
- Born: March 13, 1975 (age 51) Scottsdale, Arizona, U.S.
- Listed height: 6 ft 1 in (1.85 m)
- Listed weight: 175 lb (79 kg)

Career information
- High school: Carlsbad High School (Carlsbad, California)
- College: Stanford (1994–1998)
- WNBA draft: 1998: 4th round, 39th overall pick
- Drafted by: New York Liberty
- Playing career: 1999–2003
- Position: Forward
- Coaching career: 2003–present

Career history

Playing
- 1999: Cleveland Rockers
- 2000–2001: Portland Fire
- 2002: Miami Sol
- 2003: Los Angeles Sparks

Coaching
- 2003–2004: Long Beach State (Assistant)
- 2004–2008: Pepperdine (Assistant)
- 2008: San Antonio Stars (Assistant)
- 2008–2012: Windward School (Associate HC)
- 2012–2021: Windward School
- 2021: Las Vegas Aces (Assistant)
- 2022–2023: Phoenix Mercury
- 2024–: UC San Diego (Associate HC)

Career highlights
- All Pac-10 (1998)
- Stats at Basketball Reference

Vanessa Nygaard (born March 13, 1975) is an American professional basketball coach and former player in the Women's National Basketball Association (WNBA). She was the former head coach for the Phoenix Mercury. She currently is Associate Head Coach for UC San Diego.

== Stanford University ==
After graduating from high school in Carlsbad, California, Nygaard attended Stanford University from 1993 to 1998, and was a star player for their women's basketball team, known as The Cardinal. During her time there, the team accumulated a combined 113-14 won-loss record, including an impressive 69-2 within the Pacific-10 Conference, and reached three Final Fours. Nygaard graduated in 1998, majoring in American Studies.

== Playing career ==
After graduating from Stanford, Nygaard began her six-year career in the WNBA. She was selected by the New York Liberty in the fourth round (39th overall pick) of the 1998 WNBA draft. She missed the 1998 and most of the 1999 seasons due to injury, but joined the starting lineup with the Portland Fire team in 2000 and 2001 and with the Miami Sol team in 2002. She also played for the Cleveland Rockers, the Charlotte Sting, and the Los Angeles Sparks. Prior to the 2004 WNBA season began, Nygaard signed a free agent contract with the Houston Comets, but was waived by the team during training camp. She signed another contract with the Comets prior to the 2005 season, but decided to announce her retirement instead. Her best season came with the Sol in 2002, when she averaged 7.9 points and 3.8 rebounds per game.

During the WNBA off-season, she played in professional basketball leagues in Europe, including Germany (2001), Spain (1999) and Italy (1998).

== Coaching career ==
In 2003, Nygaard became an assistant coach for the women's basketball team at California State University, Long Beach. The following year, in June 2004, she was hired as an assistant coach with Pepperdine University.

In 2008, she was named as an assistant coach for the San Antonio Silver Stars and helped the team to appear in the WNBA Finals, before losing to the Detroit Shock.

Nygaard took over as head coach of the girls' basketball team at Windward School in 2012-13. She has coached the team to three state titles, in 2013, 2017, and 2018.

In 2017, she joined USA Basketball as an assistant coach, helping lead the team during the 2017 FIBA America's Under-16 Championship and the 2018 FIBA Under-17 World Cup.

In 2021, she joined head coach Bill Laimbeer on the Las Vegas Aces staff as an assistant coach.

Nygaard was named as the head coach of the Phoenix Mercury on January 24, 2022. The Mercury fired Nygaard on June 25, 2023, after starting the 2023 season 2–10.

== Career statistics ==
Legend
GP	Games played	GS	Games started	MPG	Minutes per game	RPG	Rebounds per game
APG	Assists per game	SPG	Steals per game	BPG	Blocks per game	PPG	Points per game
TO	Turnovers per game	FG%	Field-goal percentage	3P%	3-point field-goal percentage	FT%	Free-throw percentage
**Bold**	Career best	°	League leader

=== WNBA ===
==== Regular season ====
Year	Team	GP	GS	MPG	FG%	3P%	FT%	RPG	APG	SPG	BPG	TO	PPG
1998	Did not play (waived)												
1999	Cleveland	4	0	5.0	**50.0**	**50.0**	0.0	0.8	0.5	0.5	0.0	0.5	0.8
2000	Portland	**32**	**28**	**26.3**	43.5	33.3	75.9	**3.8**	**0.9**	**0.5**	**0.2**	1.2	**7.9**
2001	Portland	31	0	8.4	38.9	38.8	33.3	1.1	0.3	0.2	0.1	0.5	2.5
2002	Miami	29	22	15.3	42.6	37.5	**76.9**	2.3	0.3	0.4	0.0	**0.4**	4.1
2003	Los Angeles	11	3	15.3	44.4	35.3	75.0	1.7	0.5	0.3	0.0	**0.4**	3.7
Career	5 years, 4 teams	107	53	16.2	42.6	36.0	74.3	2.3	0.5	0.4	0.1	0.7	4.6

==== Playoffs ====
Year	Team	GP	GS	MPG	FG%	3P%	FT%	RPG	APG	SPG	BPG	TO	PPG
2003	Los Angeles	5	0	4.8	60.0	100.0	0.0	1.0	0.0	0.2	0.2	0.2	1.6
Career	1 year, 1 team	5	0	4.8	60.0	100.0	0.0	1.0	0.0	0.2	0.2	0.2	1.6

=== College ===
Year	Team	GP	GS	MPG	FG%	3P%	FT%	RPG	APG	SPG	BPG	TO	PPG
1994–95	Stanford	29	-	-	35.0	24.3	65.0	2.2	0.6	0.4	0.0	-	3.2
1995–96	Stanford	**31**	-	-	44.3	38.9	59.0	**7.0**	**2.3**	1.1	0.1	-	14.2
1996–97	Stanford	**31**	-	-	43.2	36.7	75.0	6.9	2.2	**1.4**	**0.2**	-	11.6
1997–98	Stanford	26	-	-	**49.8**	**45.9**	**75.7**	6.2	2.1	1.2	0.1	-	**14.9**
**Career**		117	-	-	44.5	39.2	68.9	5.6	1.8	1.1	0.1	-	10.9
Statistics retrieved from Sports-Reference.

== Head coaching record ==
Legend
Regular season	G	Games coached	W	Games won	L	Games lost	W–L %	Win–loss %
Playoffs	PG	Playoff games	PW	Playoff wins	PL	Playoff losses	PW–L %	Playoff win–loss %

Team	Year	G	W	L	W–L%	Finish	PG	PW	PL	PW–L%	Result
PHO	2022	36	15	21	.417	4th in West	2	0	2	.000	Lost in First Round
PHO	2023	12	2	10	.167	6th in West (at time of firing)	-	-	-	–	Fired after 12 Games
Career		48	17	31	.354		2	0	2	.000	
