= Desiree Francis =

American basketball player (born 1975)

Personal information
- Born: 24 August 1975 (age 51)
- Listed height: 5 ft 10 in (1.78 m)

Career information
- College: Kirkwood CC (1996–1998); Iowa State (1998–2000)
- WNBA draft: 2000: 2nd round, 29th overall pick
- Drafted by: New York Liberty
- Position: Power forward

Career history
- 2000: New York Liberty
- Stats at Basketball Reference

Desiree Francis (born 24 August 1975) is an American former basketball player. Francis grew up in Antigua in the Caribbean. She moved to Iowa in 1996 to attend Kirkwood Community College. Prior to her arrival at Kirkwood, Francis had not played basketball for four years but was invited to the team by coach Kim Muhl on the recommendation of former Kirkwood player Arnold Barnes. During her two year stint at Kirkwood, the team went 68-5. In 1998 she transferred to Iowa State where she was noted for her good 3-point shooting and defense. She was drafted by the New York Liberty in the 2000 WNBA draft.

== Career statistics ==
=== WNBA career statistics ===
Legend
GP	Games played	GS	Games started	MPG	Minutes per game	RPG	Rebounds per game
APG	Assists per game	SPG	Steals per game	BPG	Blocks per game	PPG	Points per game
TO	Turnovers per game	FG%	Field-goal percentage	3P%	3-point field-goal percentage	FT%	Free-throw percentage
**Bold**	Career best	°	League leader

==== Regular season ====
Year	Team	GP	GS	MPG	FG%	3P%	FT%	RPG	APG	SPG	BPG	TO	PPG
2000	New York	1	0	2.0	0.0	0.0	0.0	0.0	0.0	0.0	0.0	0.0	0.0
Career	1 year, 1 team	1	0	2.0	0.0	0.0	0.0	0.0	0.0	0.0	0.0	0.0	0.0

=== College ===
Year	Team	GP	GS	MPG	FG%	3P%	FT%	RPG	APG	SPG	BPG	TO	PPG
1998–99	Iowa State	29			52.5	29.6	69.8	6.7	1.2	1.8	0.5		13.6
1999–00	Iowa State	32			54.5	42.2	74.0	6.0	1.0	1.8	0.3		13.7
**Career**		61			53.6	36.6	71.3	6.3	1.1	1.8	0.4		13.7
Statistics retrieved from Sports-Reference.

== See also ==
- List of foreign WNBA players
