= Olga Firsova =

Ukrainian-American basketball player (born 1976)

Personal information
- Born: April 23, 1976 (age 50) Kyiv, Ukrainian SSR, Soviet Union
- Listed height: 6 ft 8 in (2.03 m)
- Listed weight: 215 lb (98 kg)

Career information
- College: Weatherford (1997–1999); Kansas State (1999–2000)
- WNBA draft: 2000: 1st round, 13th overall pick
- Drafted by: New York Liberty
- Position: Center

Career history
- 2000: New York Liberty
- Stats at Basketball Reference

Olga Firsova (born April 23, 1976) is a former professional basketball player.

== College ==
Firsova earned a degree in marketing and international business.

== Career statistics ==
=== College career statistics ===
Legend
GP	Games played	GS	Games started	MPG	Minutes per game
FG%	Field goal percentage	3P%	3-point field goal percentage	FT%	Free throw percentage
RPG	Rebounds per game	APG	Assists per game	SPG	Steals per game
BPG	Blocks per game	PPG	Points per game	**Bold**	Career high

Year	Team	GP	Points	FG%	3P%	FT%	RPG	APG	SPG	BPG	PPG
1998-99	Kansas State	29	**311**	44.1	**50.0**	**80.0**	5.9	**1.2**	0.3	**1.7**	**10.7**
1999-00	Kansas State	**30**	273	**44.2**	**50.0**	65.6	**6.1**	0.9	**0.5**	**1.7**	9.1
Career	Kansas State	59	584	44.1	50.0	71.0	6.0	1.1	0.4	1.7	9.9

=== WNBA career statistics ===
Legend
GP	Games played	GS	Games started	MPG	Minutes per game	RPG	Rebounds per game
APG	Assists per game	SPG	Steals per game	BPG	Blocks per game	PPG	Points per game
TO	Turnovers per game	FG%	Field-goal percentage	3P%	3-point field-goal percentage	FT%	Free-throw percentage
**Bold**	Career best	°	League leader

==== Regular season ====
Year	Team	GP	GS	MPG	FG%	3P%	FT%	RPG	APG	SPG	BPG	TO	PPG
2000	New York	9	0	2.1	40.0	0.0	80.0	0.4	0.1	0.0	0.1	0.2	1.3
Career	1 year, 1 team	9	0	2.1	40.0	0.0	80.0	0.4	0.1	0.0	0.1	0.2	1.3

==== Playoffs ====
Year	Team	GP	GS	MPG	FG%	3P%	FT%	RPG	APG	SPG	BPG	TO	PPG
2000	New York	3	0	2.0	75.0	0.0	0.0	0.3	0.0	0.0	0.0	0.0	2.0
Career	1 year, 1 team	3	0	2.0	75.0	0.0	0.0	0.3	0.0	0.0	0.0	0.0	2.0

== Honors and awards ==
- Two-time Academic All-Big 12 honorable mention choice
- Two-time All-Big 12 honorable mention selection.

== Personal life ==
She became a United States citizen on July 25, 2008.
