= Kara Wolters =

American basketball player (born 1975)

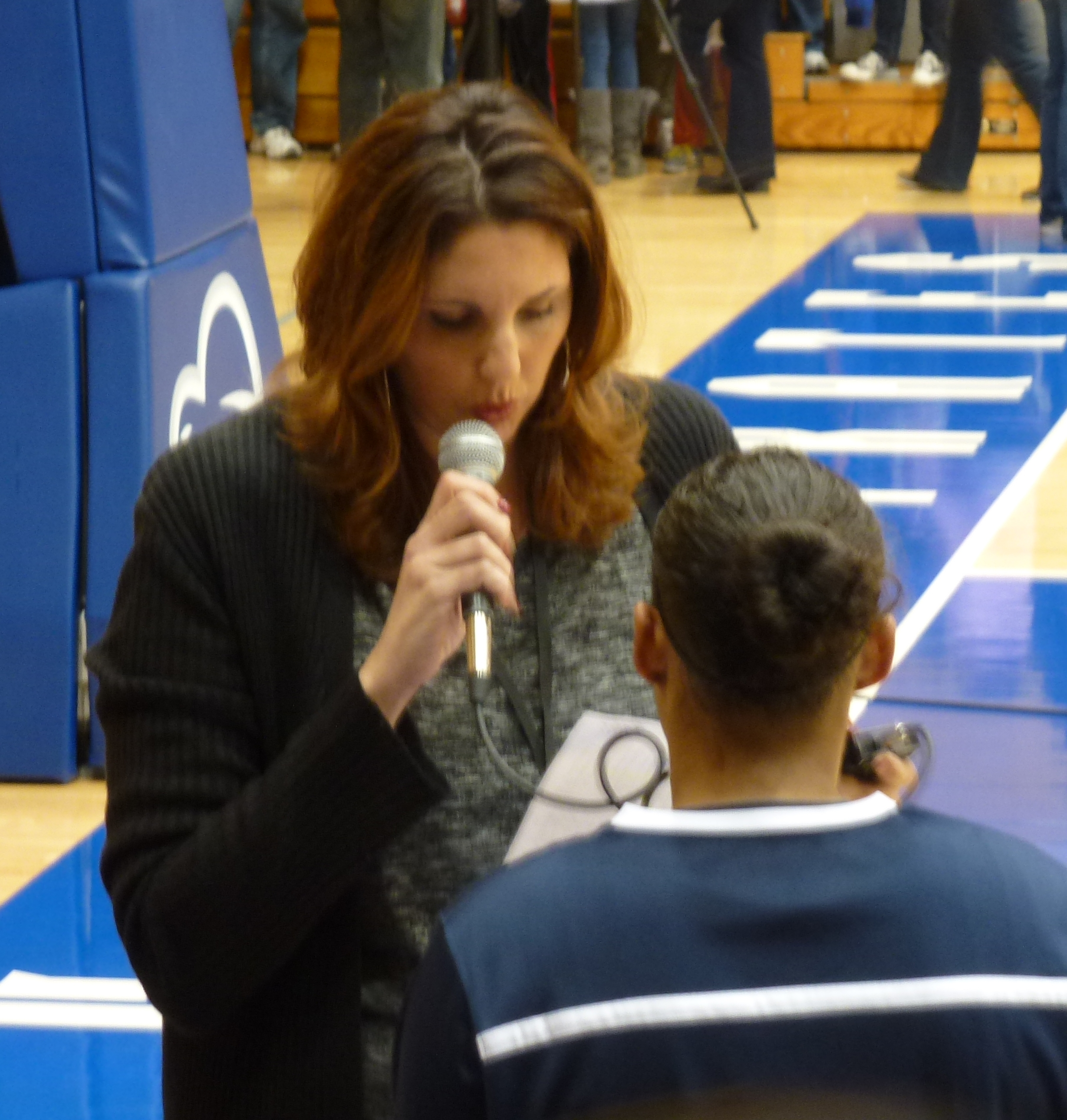
- Wolters with a fan

Personal information
- Born: August 15, 1975 (age 51) Natick, Massachusetts, U.S.
- Listed height: 6 ft 7 in (2.01 m)
- Listed weight: 227 lb (103 kg)

Career information
- High school: Holliston (Holliston, Massachusetts)
- College: UConn (1993–1997)
- WNBA draft: 1999: 3rd round, 36th overall pick
- Drafted by: Houston Comets
- Playing career: 1997–2003
- Position: Center

Career history
- 1997–1998: New England Blizzard
- 1999: Houston Comets
- 2000: Indiana Fever
- 2001–2002: Sacramento Monarchs

Career highlights
- WNBA champion (1999); NCAA champion (1995); AP College Player of the Year (1997); Big East Player of the Year (1997); 2× Big East Tournament MOP (1995, 1996); Kodak All-American (1997); 2× All-American – USBWA (1996, 1997); 2× First-team All-American – AP (1996, 1997); Third-team All-American – AP (1995); 2× First-team All-Big East (1996, 1997); Big East All-Freshman Team (1994)
- Stats at Basketball Reference
- Women's Basketball Hall of Fame
Medals
Women's basketball
Representing the United States
Olympic Games
Gold medal – first place	2000 Sydney	Team competition
World Cup
Gold medal – first place	1998 Brazil	Team competition
Bronze medal – third place	1994 Brazil	Team competition
Universiade
Gold medal – first place	1997 Sicily	Team competition
Silver medal – second place	1995 Fukuoka	Team competition
Jones Cup
Gold medal – first place	1996	Team competition

Kara Elizabeth Wolters (born August 15, 1975) is an American former collegiate and professional basketball player and a current sports broadcaster. Standing at six feet seven inches (2.01 m) and nicknamed "Big Girl," she is the tallest player in University of Connecticut women's basketball history and one of the tallest women to ever play in the WNBA. During her playing career, she was an NCAA national champion (1995), FIBA world champion (1998), WNBA champion (1999), and Olympic champion (2000) becoming one of 11 women with those accolades. She also won AP College Player of the Year in 1997

Following her professional playing career, Wolters moved into broadcasting. She started as a radio color commentator for women's basketball on WTIC (AM), and since 2012 has served as the in-studio analyst for women's basketball on SNY. She also runs the Kara Wolters Dream Big Basketball Camp in Connecticut.

Wolters was inducted into the Women's Basketball Hall of Fame in 2017.

== Personal ==
Wolters was born the youngest child of Liz and William Wolters and grew up in a basketball family. Her mother, Liz, once scored 50 points in one game at Wellesley High, more than any Massachusetts high school player before. Her father, known as Willie, is in the Boston College Hall of Fame and was an eighth-round Seattle SuperSonics draft pick in the 1967 NBA draft who later worked as an insurance lawyer. Wolters has always worn uniform number 52, the same number as her father, as a tribute. Her maternal grandfather played Minor League Baseball in the New York Yankees system.

Already 6 feet 3 inches (1.91 m) in eighth grade, Wolters continued to grow rapidly during her career at Holliston High School, where she still retains the schools scoring, rebounding and blocked shots record. She was bullied over her height and build as a youth and was ignored by some college recruiters who thought her body type was a negative attribute for basketball.

Her brother Ray played basketball at Assumption College and later Eastern Connecticut State University. She has two older sisters: Kristen, who also played college basketball, at Rhode Island, and Katie. Katie dealt with brain cancer from age six until her death in 2004, which inspired Kara to establish the "Kara Kares Foundation" in 1998 to support brain tumor research.

Wolters married Sean Drinan, a financial advisor, in November 2004. They have two daughters, Sydney and Delaney.

== University of Connecticut ==
Wolters played for the women's basketball team at the University of Connecticut from 1993 to 1997. She was a member of the 1995 team that won the NCAA Women's Division I Basketball Championship, which capped a perfect 35–0 season. Her UConn team compiled a 132–8 record (94.3%). She appeared in four NCAA Tournaments, advanced to the 1996 Final Four, the 1994 and 1997 Final Eights and won four Big East Conference Championships and four Big East tournament titles. In 1997 she was named the National Player of the Year.

She finished her career as Connecticut's all-time leading rebounder (1286) and shot blocker (396). In 1997, UConn head coach Geno Auriemma referred to her as a potential Hall of Famer, while Tennessee head coach Pat Summitt and Stanford coach Tara VanDerveer also complimented her play and presence on the court.

Wolters was a member of the inaugural class (2006) of inductees to the University of Connecticut women's basketball "Huskies of Honor" recognition program.

== USA Basketball ==
Wolters was invited to be a member of the Jones Cup team representing the US in 1996. She helped the team to a 9–0 record, and the gold medal in the event. Wolters averaged 5.9 points per game.

Wolters represented the US at the 1997 World University Games held in Marsala, Sicily, Italy in August 1997. The USA team won all six games, earning the gold medal at the event. In the semi-final game against the previously unbeaten Czech Republic, Wolters scored 14 points, recorded ten rebounds and blocked five shots to hold the team win and advance to the gold medal game. Wolters averaged 11.3 points per game, second highest on the team and had 13 blocks, more than the rest of the team combined.

Wolters was named to the USA national team in 1998. The national team traveled to Berlin, Germany in July and August 1998 for the FIBA World Championships. The USA team won a close opening game against Japan 95–89, then won their next six games easily. In the semifinal game against Brazil, the USA team was behind as much as ten points in the first half, but the USA went on to win 93–79. The gold medal game was a rematch against Russia. In the first game, the USA team dominated almost from the beginning, but in the rematch, the team from Russia took the early lead and led much of the way. With under two minutes remaining, the USA was down by two points but the USA responded, then held on to win the gold medal 71–65. Wolters averaged 5.0 points per game and recorded seven blocks.

== Professional ==
=== ABL ===
Wolters was drafted by the New England Blizzard of the ABL in 1997. She played for the team in the 1997–98 and 1998–99 seasons, the final two of the league's existence.

=== WNBA ===
Wolters was selected by the Houston Comets in the third round (36th overall) in the 1999 WNBA draft.

During the 2000 expansion draft on December 15, 1999, Wolters was selected by the Indiana Fever.

Wolters was traded to the Sacramento Monarchs for the 14th pick in the 2001 WNBA draft on April 11, 2001. Wolters continued to play for the Monarchs until May 20, 2003, when she was released.

In her four-year WNBA career, Wolters averaged 50 percent in field goal shooting, 75 percent in free throw shooting, 3.2 rebounds per game, and 6.5 points per game.

=== International ===
Wolters was a member of the gold medal-winning U.S. Olympic women's basketball team during the 2000 Summer Olympics in Sydney, Australia.

She ranks second among all-time USA World Championship competitors for the most blocked shots (11).

Wolters is one of only 12 women to receive a Gold Medal in the Olympics, an NCAA championship, and a WNBA Championship. The others are Sue Bird, Swin Cash, Tamika Catchings, Cynthia Cooper-Dyke, Brittney Griner, Maya Moore, Candace Parker, Ruth Riley, Breanna Stewart, Sheryl Swoopes, and Diana Taurasi.

== Honors and awards ==
=== USA Basketball notes ===
- Gold Medal: 2000 2000 Summer Olympics
- Gold Medal: 1999 U.S. Olympic Cup
- Gold Medal: 1998 World Championship
- Gold Medal: 1997 World University Games
- Gold Medal: 1996 R. William Jones Cup
- Silver Medal: 1995 World University Games
- Bronze Medal: 1994 World Championship
- Named to the 1999–2000 USA Basketball Women's Senior National Team on January 6, 2000.
- Member of the gold medal-winning 1998 USA World Championship Team which finished with a perfect 9–0 record and was named the 1998 USA Basketball Team of the Year; aided the U.S. to a 12–1 record in its 13-game pre-World Championship tour.
- Selected as one of the first six members to the 1998 USA Basketball Women's World Championship Team on September 4, 1997.
- 1996 USA Olympic Team finalist (18).
- The only collegian named to the bronze medal-winning 1994 USA World Championship Team.

=== USA Basketball records ===
- Ranks second among all-time USA World Championship competitors for blocked shots (11).
- Drafted by the Indiana Fever in the fourth round (16th overall) of the 2000 WNBA expansion draft.
- Drafted by the Houston Comets in the third round (36th overall) of the 1999 WNBA draft.
- Averaged 1.6 ppg. and 1.2 rpg. for the Houston Comets in 1999.
- Prior to the ABL folding in December, 1998, ranked among league leaders 24th for scoring (11.0 ppg.), 16th for rebounding (5.3 rpg.), third for blocked shots (16) and first for field goal percentage (58.4%).
- Finished the 1997–98 ABL season ranked as the league's leader for blocked shots (1.5 bpg.), fourth in field goal percentage (53.5%) and 16th in rebounds (5.2 rpg.).
- Selected as the third pick in the 1997 ABL Draft by the New England Blizzard.

=== Collegiate notes ===
- During her four seasons (1993–97), UConn compiled a 132–8 record (94.3%), appeared in four NCAA Tournaments, won the 1995 NCAA championship, advanced to the 1996 Final Four, the 1997 and 1994 Final Eights, and won four Big East Conference championships and four Big East tournament titles.
- Named by Associated Press 1997 All-America first team and Player of the Year.
- Runner-up for the 1997 Boost/Naismith National Player of the Year.
- Awarded the 1996 Victor Award as the nation's top female collegiate player.
- Ranks second among all-time USA World Championship competitors for blocked shots (11).
- She is one of three finalists for the 1997 Women's College Basketball ESPY award.
- Named 1997 All-America by Basketball America, United States Basketball Writers Association (USBWA) and Kodak.
- Named 1996 All-America first team by the USBWA, United Press International and the Associated Press.
- Named 1997 and 1995 District I All-America by Kodak, and 1996 All-America honorable mention by Kodak.
- Named to 1995 NCAA Tournament All-Final Four Team, averaged 20.5 ppg. in the Final Four.
- Named to 1997 and 1996 All-NCAA Midwest Regional and 1995 and 1994 All-NCAA East Regional.
- Named 1997 Big East Conference Women's Basketball Player of the Year, 1997 and 1996 All-Big East first team, 1995 All-Big East second team and 1994 Big East All-Rookie Team.
- Named 1996 and 1995 Big East tournament Most Outstanding Player and Big East All-Tournament all four years.

== Career statistics ==
=== WNBA ===
Legend
GP	Games played	GS	Games started	MPG	Minutes per game	RPG	Rebounds per game
APG	Assists per game	SPG	Steals per game	BPG	Blocks per game	PPG	Points per game
TO	Turnovers per game	FG%	Field-goal percentage	3P%	3-point field-goal percentage	FT%	Free-throw percentage
**Bold**	Career best	°	League leader

==== Regular season ====
Year	Team	GP	GS	MPG	FG%	3P%	FT%	RPG	APG	SPG	BPG	TO	PPG
1999	Houston	10	0	4.1	23.1	0.0	**83.3**	1.2	0.2	0.1	0.0	**0.3**	1.6
2000	Indiana	**31**	**30**	**25.6**	**56.1**	0.0	74.0	**5.3**	**1.3**	**0.4**	**1.6**	2.4	**11.9**
2001	Sacramento	**31**	1	12.2	47.0	0.0	80.6	2.4	0.5	0.1	0.8	1.1	4.9
2002	Sacramento	14	0	5.6	32.1	0.0	60.0	1.6	0.2	0.0	0.2	0.4	1.7
Career	4 years, 3 teams	86	31	15.0	50.8	0.0	75.2	3.2	0.7	0.2	0.9	1.3	6.5

==== Playoffs ====
Year	Team	GP	GS	MPG	FG%	3P%	FT%	RPG	APG	SPG	BPG	TO	PPG
1999	Houston	2	0	2.5	**100.0**	0.0	**100.0**	0.5	0.0	0.0	0.0	0.5	2.0
2001	Sacramento	**4**	0	**9.3**	35.7	0.0	0.0	**1.0**	**0.3**	**0.5**	**0.5**	**0.3**	**2.5**
Career	2 years, 2 teams	6	0	7.0	40.0	0.0	100.0	0.8	0.2	0.3	0.3	0.3	2.3

=== College ===
Kara Wolters Statistics at University of Connecticut
Year	G	FG	FGA	PCT	3FG	3FGA	PCT	FT	FTA	PCT	REB	AVG	A	TO	B	S	MIN	PTS	AVG
1993–94	33	168	264	0.636	0	0	0	29	57	0.509	159	4.8	9	54	75	12	511	365	11.1
1994–95	33	222	354	0.627	0	0	0	59	89	0.663	204	6.2	38	60	94	13	761	503	15.2
1995–96	37	306	486	0.630	0	0	0	82	142	0.577	291	7.9	37	103	105	14	978	694	18.8
1996–97	34	251	403	0.623	0	0	0	77	135	0.57	273	8.0	46	78	96	12	894	579	17.0
Totals	137	947	1507	0.628	0	0	0	247	423	0.584	927	6.8	130	295	370	51	3144	2141	15.6

== See also ==
- List of Connecticut women's basketball players with 1000 points
