= Daliborka Vilipić =

Serbian basketball player (born 1975)

Personal information
- Born: March 30, 1975 (age 51) Banja Luka, SFR Yugoslavia
- Listed height: 1.96 m (6 ft 5 in)
- Listed weight: 94 kg (207 lb)

Career information
- Playing career: –2014
- Position: Center

Career history
- 1995–1998: Crvena zvezda
- 1995–1999: Razvojna banka
- 1999–2002: Gysev Ringa
- 2002–2004: Basket Parma
- 2004–2005: MiZo-Pecsi
- 2005: DKSK Miskolc
- 2006: Anda
- 2006: Los Angeles Sparks
- 2006–2007: Wisła Kraków
- 2007–2008: Electra Ramat-Hasharon
- 2008–2009: Basket Parma
- 2009–2010: Hemofarm
- 2010: K.V. Imperial AEL
- 2010–2011: ASDG Comense 1872
- 2011–2012: Pozzuoli
- 2012–2014: EKK Cegledi
- Stats at Basketball Reference

Daliborka Vilipić (Serbian Cyrillic: Дaлиборкa Вилипић, born 30 March 1975 in Banja Luka, SFR Yugoslavia) is a Serbian female basketball player.

== See also ==
- List of Serbian WNBA players
