= Kelley Gibson =

American basketball player and sports coach

Kelley Gibson (born November 11, 1976) is an assistant basketball coach with the University of Miami since 2020. During her assistant coaching experience from the 2000s to 2010s, Gibson has worked with various universities such as the University of Maine, Syracuse University, and Rutgers University Before becoming a coach, Gibson played basketball at Easton High School during the early 1990s. With Easton, Gibson and her team won the 1A championships held by the Maryland Public Secondary Schools Athletic Association in 1993 and 1994. During her time at Easton, Gibson had over 2,200 points and 1,000 rebounds.

As part of the Maryland Terrapins women's basketball team from 1994 to 1998, Gibson accumulated 955 points during her 96 games with Maryland. With the university, Gibson held multiple blocks and three point percentage season records for Maryland. While playing with the Houston Comets in the WNBA, Gibson appeared in the 2000 WNBA Playoffs and won the 2000 WNBA Championship. After receiving the Offseason Community Assist Award from the WNBA in 2003, Gibson left the Comets in 2004 with 166 points. Also in the WNBA, Gibson also interned with the Philadelphia 76ers marketing department. In the National Women's Basketball League, Gibson won the 2003 Pro Cup with the Houston Stealth and played in the NWBL's All-Star Game in 2004.

== Early life and education ==
=== Easton ===
Gibson lived in Easton, Maryland after her birth there on November 11, 1976. While living with her siblings, Gibson participated in multiple sports before she focused on basketball pick-up games against boys. During the early 1990s, Gibson played basketball while attending Easton High School. While with Easton, Gibson and her team won the Class 1A girls basketball championship for Maryland in 1993 and 1994.

During the 1A championships held by the Maryland Public Secondary Schools Athletic Association, Gibson scored 39 points in the 1993 semifinal. Before the following championship, Gibson missed several games during January 1994 due to a chest injury she obtained from a car accident. In February 1994, Gibson reached 1,000 rebounds and 2,000 points with Easton in February 1994. By the time Gibson left Easton, she had made over 2,200 career points for the high school.

=== Maryland ===
In November 1994, Gibson began playing on the Maryland Terrapins women's basketball team. Her coach, Chris Weller, said Gibson was "the potential female equivalent of Scottie Pippen" during a media conference prior to the beginning of the 1994–95 season. With Maryland, Gibson and her team made it to the first round of the Women's National Invitation Tournament during the 1994 preseason. After injuring her anterior cruciate ligament that year, Gibson would not play for the rest of the season as she had a scheduled surgery and rehabilitation for the majority of 1995.

Upon returning from her right knee injury during the 1995–96 season, Gibson became a redshirt. In January 1997, Gibson had a left knee injury in her ACL. She did not play for the remainder of the 1996–97 season and underwent knee surgery that year. Gibson resumed her time with the Terrapins in November 1997.

Following her second injury to her ACL in 1997, Gibson had considered ending her basketball career before deciding to continue playing. After becoming a redshirt for a year, Gibson underwent surgery and rehab for an additional ACL injury she endured during the 1998-99 preseason. After her final year in 1999, Gibson accumulated 955 points and 376 rebounds during her 96 games with Maryland. During her playing career, Gibson held the three point percentage and blocks season record with Maryland several times. With these records for Maryland, Gibson was both the blocks and assists season record holder in 1998. Apart from basketball, Gibson attended Maryland on a scholarship and studied kinesiology.

== Career ==
=== Basketball career ===
As a free agent in the WNBA, Gibson was primarily with the Houston Comets between 2000 and 2004. During this time period, Gibson had a brief contract with the Indiana Fever in 2003 before she rejoined Houston that year. After her 100 regular season games with Houston, Gibson had 77 rebounds and 55 field goals as part of her 166 points.

She appeared in playoff games for Houston during 2001 to 2003. In 2003, Gibson was part of a speakers bureau with the Comets after their season ended. She continued her speaker experience the following season with the Comets.

In the National Women's Basketball League, Gibson and the Houston Stealth won the Pro Cup in 2003. The following year, Gibson was on the National team that appeared in the 2004 All-Star Game held by the NWBL. In 2005, Gibson continued her NWBL career with the Chicago Blaze. Outside of the United States, Gibson played basketball in Israel and Russia.

=== Coaching and teaching career ===
While with the Comets, Gibson co-created the Kelley Gibson Girls' Basketball Camp in Easton during 2002. For 2003, Gibson made a coed sports camp for youth basketball players in Easton. As an assistant coach during the 2000s, Gibson started out with American University as a graduate assistant in 2005. After going to University of Maryland, Baltimore County in 2006, Gibson was with the University of Maine from 2007 to 2008. In 2009, Gibson became part of the University of Southern California as an assistant coach.

From 2010 to 2015, Gibson was in the recruiting coordinator for Syracuse University. She then joined Rutgers University from 2015-2019. During the 2010s, Gibson created the Sure Basketball Academy in 2019, which help children in the Eastern Shore of Maryland improve at basketball. Gibson also planned to create a youth basketball league with her academy. Gibson remained with Rutgers until she was hired by the University of Miami as an assistant coach in 2020.

== Awards and honors ==
During her time at Easton, Gibson was selected four times by The Star-Democrat as their Player of the Year for the Mid-Shore in girls basketball. In 2001, a jersey worn by Gibson had been retired by Easton High. That year, Kelley Gibson Street was created in Easton. From the WNBA, she received the Offseason Community Assist Award in 2003. In 2019, Gibson became part of an Athletic Hall of Fame for Easton High.
