= Dallas Wings =

Women's National Basketball Association team in Arlington, Texas

- 2026 Dallas Wings season
- Conference: Western
- League: WNBA
- Founded: 1998
- History: Detroit Shock; 1998–2009; Tulsa Shock; 2010–2015; Dallas Wings; 2016–present
- Arena: College Park Center
- Location: Arlington, Texas
- Team colors: Navy, volt green, blue, cyan
- Main sponsor: Texas Capital Bank
- President: Greg Bibb
- General manager: Curt Miller
- Head coach: Jose Fernandez
- Assistants: Camille Smith; Belle Koclanes
- Ownership: Bill Cameron; Chris Christian; Mark Yancey; Greg Bibb
- Championships: 3 (2003, 2006, 2008)
- Conference titles: 4 (2003, 2006, 2007, 2008)
- Website: wings.wnba.com
Heroine	Explorer

The Dallas Wings are an American professional basketball team based in the Dallas–Fort Worth metroplex. The Wings compete in the Women's National Basketball Association (WNBA) as a member of the Western Conference. The team is owned by a group led by chairman Bill Cameron. Greg Bibb is president and CEO. Brad Hilsabeck joined the Dallas Wings ownership group in March 2019 with the acquisition of Mark Yancey's interest in the Wings.

The team was founded in Auburn Hills, Michigan, as the Detroit Shock before the 1998 WNBA season began. It then moved to Tulsa, Oklahoma, before the 2010 season and became the Tulsa Shock. On July 20, 2015, Cameron announced that the franchise would move to Arlington for the 2016 WNBA season.

The team qualified for the WNBA playoffs in eight of their twelve years in Detroit and in one of their six years in Tulsa. As the Wings, the team qualified for the playoffs in five of their ten years in Dallas. In 2003, 2006, 2007 and 2008 the franchise went to the WNBA Finals; they lost to Phoenix in 2007, but won the title in 2003, 2006 and 2008 over Los Angeles, Sacramento and San Antonio respectively.

The franchise has been home to players such as Deanna Nolan, one of women's basketball's all-time leading scorers, Katie Smith, Cheryl Ford, Swin Cash, Skylar Diggins, Odyssey Sims, Australian center Liz Cambage, Arike Ogunbowale, 2025 No. 1 pick Rookie of the year Paige Bueckers and 2026 No. 1 pick Azzi Fudd.

== History ==
=== 1998–2009: The Detroit Shock years ===
The Shock were one of the first WNBA expansion teams and began play in 1998. The Shock quickly brought in a blend of rookies and veterans, but only qualified for the postseason once in its first five years of existence. The Shock went through two coaches (hall of famer Nancy Lieberman and Greg Williams) before hiring former Detroit Pistons legend Bill Laimbeer. Rumors arose that the Shock would fold after the team's awful 2002 season. Laimbeer convinced the owners to keep the team for another year, certain that he could turn things around. The Shock finished the next season with a 25–9 record and defeated the two-time defending champion Los Angeles Sparks in the 2003 WNBA Finals. Detroit became the first team in league history to go from last place one season to WNBA champions the next season.

After a couple of seasons of losing in the first round of the playoffs, the Detroit Shock returned to success and appeared in three straight finals from 2006 to 2008. They won the WNBA championship in 2006 over the Sacramento Monarchs and 2008 over the San Antonio Silver Stars but lost to the Phoenix Mercury in 2007.

=== 2010–2015: The Tulsa Shock years ===
Tulsa had been mentioned as a possible future city for WNBA expansion, but efforts did not come together until the middle of 2009. An organizing committee with Tulsa businesspeople and politicians began the effort to attract an expansion team. The group was originally given a September 1 deadline, but WNBA President Donna Orender extended that deadline into October. The investment group hired former University of Arkansas head coach Nolan Richardson as the potential franchise general manager and head coach, and on October 15, 2009, the group made its official request to join the league.

On October 20, 2009, WNBA President Donna Orender, lead investors Bill Cameron and David Box, Tulsa mayor Kathy Taylor, Oklahoma governor Brad Henry, and head coach Nolan Richardson were present for a press conference announcing that the Detroit Shock would relocate to Tulsa. On January 23, 2010, the franchise announced that the team would remain as the Shock, but their colors were changed to black, red, and gold.

On July 20, 2015, majority owner Bill Cameron announced he was moving the team to Dallas-Fort Worth.

=== 2016–2024: The start of the Dallas Wings ===
On July 23, 2015, WNBA league owners unanimously approved the Tulsa Shock's relocation to the Dallas-Fort Worth Metroplex to play out of the College Park Center at the University of Texas at Arlington. College Park Center is also home to the UT Arlington Mavericks basketball and volleyball teams. At a press conference at College Park Center on November 2, 2015, the team was announced to be renamed the Dallas Wings. Uniforms were revealed at the First Annual Wings Draft Party on April 14, 2016. The light uniforms were primarily lime green, while the dark uniforms were predominantly blue. As a result of a league-wide initiative for its 20th season, all games featured all-color uniform matchups, thus no white uniforms were unveiled for this season.

The team began their first season as the Dallas Wings on May 14, 2016, following two pre-season losses, with a 90–79 victory over the Indiana Fever. The team played its first home game in Dallas on May 21, defeating in-state rivals San Antonio Stars 82–77 in front of a sell-out crowd. The game was highlighted by Irving native Odyssey Sims, who led all scorers with 23 points and would go on to finish the season as the team’s leading scorer, averaging 14.0 points per game. Despite a promising 3–1 start—even in the absence of star guard Skylar Diggins, who was recovering from an ACL injury—the Wings struggled with inconsistency throughout the season. After dropping six straight games following their strong start, Diggins' return to the lineup helped spark a four-game winning streak in June. However, the momentum was short-lived, and the team posted a 2–9 record from June 25 onward. Plagued by injuries, the Wings had a full roster available for only 12 of their 34 games. Ultimately, Dallas finished the season with a 11–23 record, placing fifth in the Western Conference and missing the playoffs by a significant margin—marking a downturn compared to their final season in Tulsa.

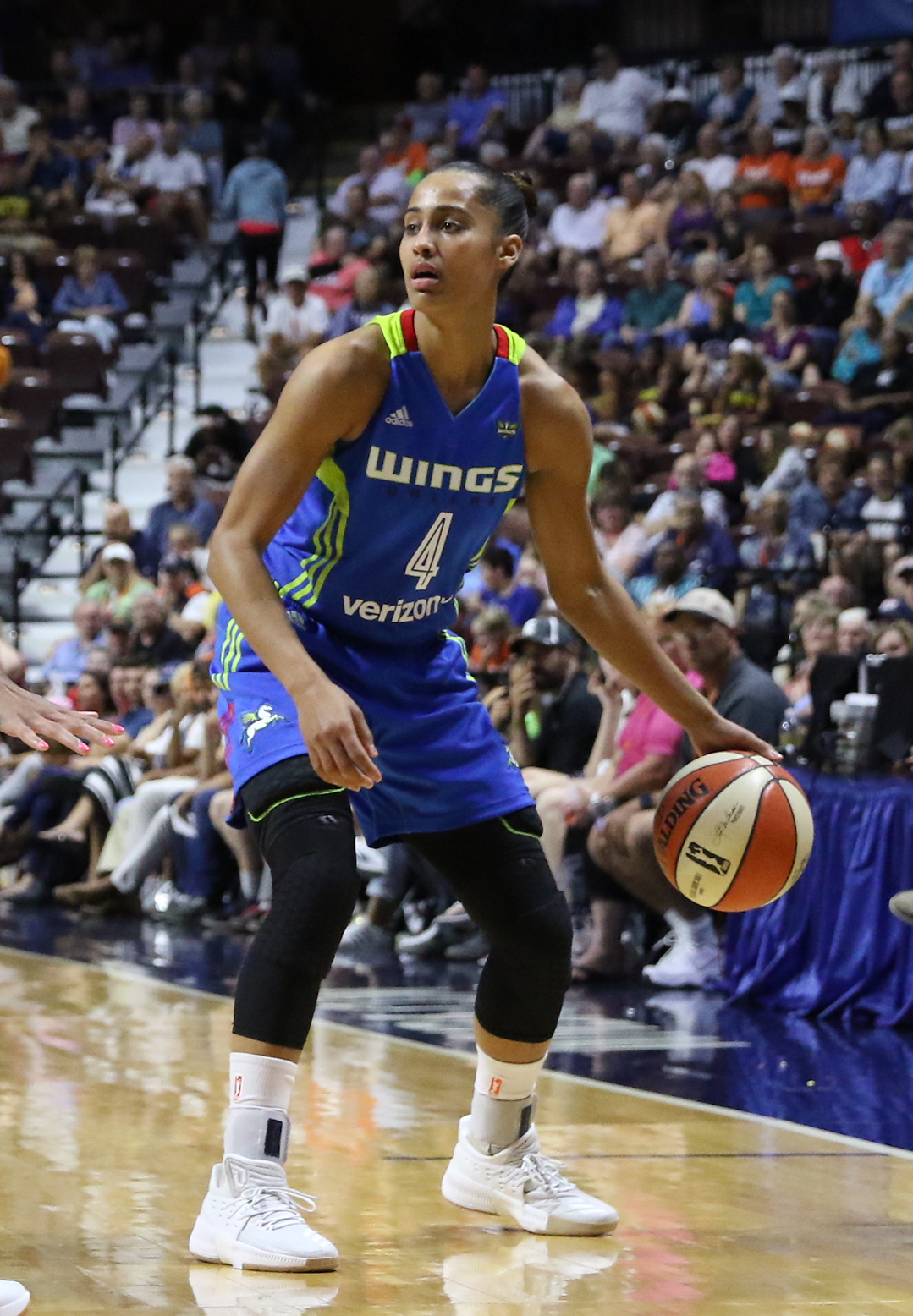
Skylar Diggins playing for the Wings in 2017.

Ahead of the season, on April 11, 2017, it was announced that Mary O’Connor had stepped down as president and CEO of the Dallas Wings, less than a year after assuming the role. General Manager Greg Bibb took over O’Connor’s responsibilities. The Wings opened the regular season on May 14 and posted an even 8–8 record through May and June. Although they endured a difficult July (3–6), the team rebounded in August with a 5–3 performance, securing a playoff berth on August 31 with a 99–96 win over the Chicago Sky. Finishing the regular season at 16–18, the Wings entered the playoffs as the 7th seed but were eliminated in the first round by the Washington Mystics, 86–76, on September 6. Led by All-Star guard Skylar Diggins and forward Glory Johnson, the Wings featured the youngest roster in the league but still managed to exceed expectations. On September 19, Allisha Gray was named the 2017 WNBA Rookie of the Year, becoming the second player in franchise history to earn the honor, joining Cheryl Ford, who won the award in 2003 with the Detroit Shock.

On February 5, 2018, the team announced the return of Australian center Liz Cambage, who signed a multiyear contract with the franchise that drafted her second overall in 2011. The season tipped off on May 18 with a 86–78 loss to the Phoenix Mercury. The Wings had a mixed start, going 2–3 in May and 5–4 in June, with six of their seven early-season losses coming against eventual playoff teams. On July 17, Cambage set a new WNBA single-game scoring record with 53 points in a 104–87 win over the New York Liberty, surpassing the previous mark of 51 points set by Riquna Williams during her time with the Tulsa Shock. Dallas posted a 8–5 record in July, including a dominant stretch in which they won seven out of eight games. However, three straight losses at the end of the month marked the start of a nine-game losing streak. Amid this losing streak, the team made a major coaching change. On August 12, head coach Fred Williams was relieved of his duties following a reported altercation with CEO Greg Bibb after a loss to the Washington Mystics. Assistant coach Taj McWilliams-Franklin was named interim head coach for the remainder of the season, leading the team to a 1–2 record over the final three games. Despite a 1–7 record in August, the Wings secured a crucial win over the Las Vegas Aces, clinching the 8th and final playoff spot by a one-game margin. Dallas ended the regular season with a 15–19 record and was eliminated in the first round of the playoffs by the Phoenix Mercury, 101–83. On December 18, the Wings announced the hiring of two-time WNBA champion Brian Agler as the team’s new head coach. Agler, who had recently stepped down from the Los Angeles Sparks after leading them to the 2016 WNBA Championship and two Finals appearances, joined Dallas with more victories than any other coach in U.S. women’s professional basketball history.

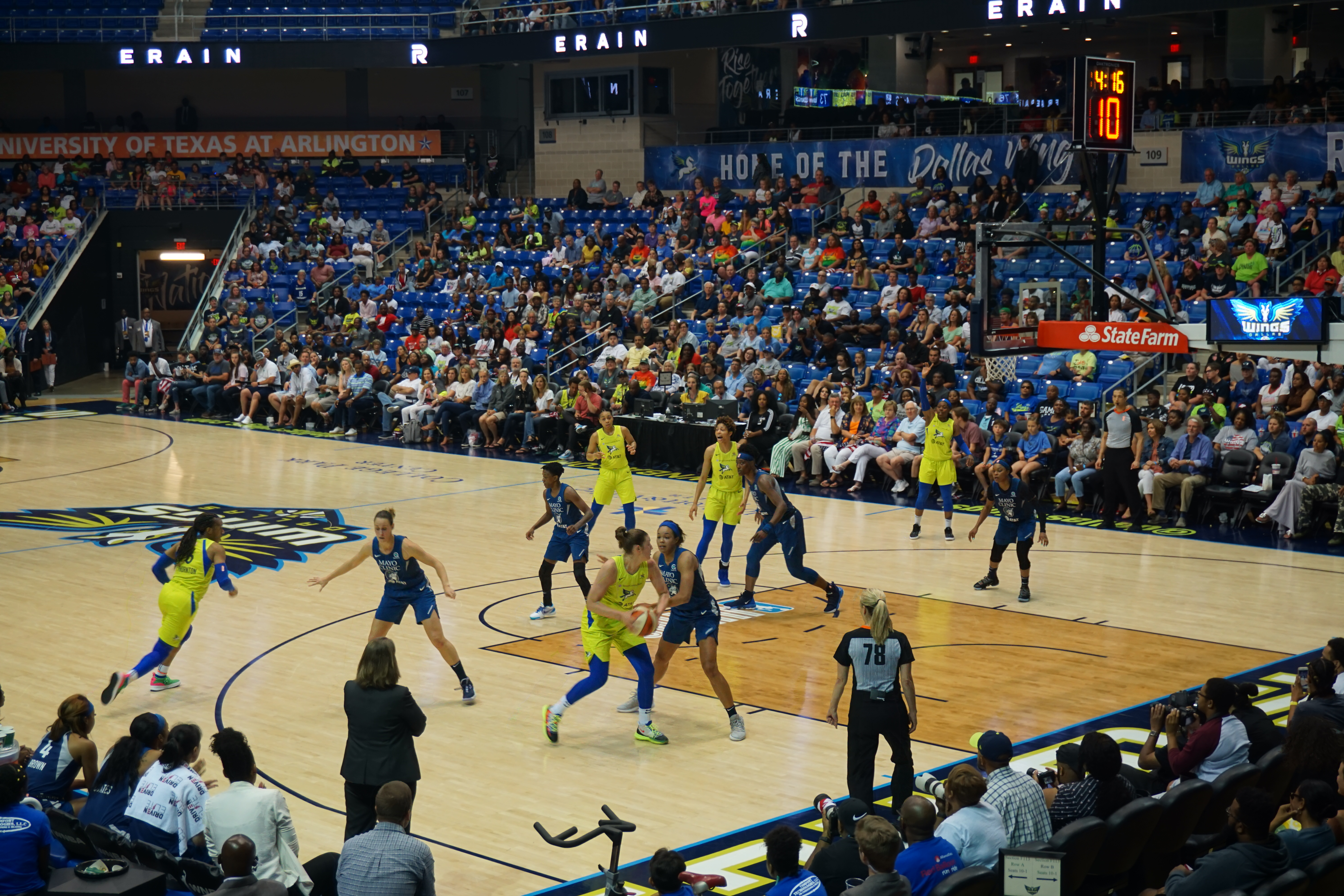
The 2019 Wings in action against Minnesota

On May 16, 2019, the team traded star center Liz Cambage to the Las Vegas Aces in exchange for guard Moriah Jefferson and forward Isabelle Harrison. Additionally, All-Star guard Skylar Diggins missed the entire season due to childbirth, leaving the Wings without their two leading players from the previous year. The season began on May 24 with a 77–72 loss to the Atlanta Dream and started with a five-game losing streak. The team showed signs of improvement in June, winning four of their next six games to close the month with a 4–7 record. However, July proved challenging, as the Wings posted a 1–8 record, with their only win coming on July 9 against the Los Angeles Sparks. Dallas slightly improved in August, going 5–6, but ended the season on a four-game losing streak. They finished with a 10–24 record, their worst since relocating to Dallas in 2016 and their lowest win total since 2012. The absence of Cambage and Diggins led to a decline in team production. Despite this, rookie guard Arike Ogunbowale averaged the third-most points per game in the league and finished second in total points (630). She set WNBA rookie records with 11 consecutive games of 20 or more points and four straight games of 30 or more points. Ogunbowale also tied a franchise record with 18 games of at least 20 points and recorded a season-high 35 points on two occasions—becoming the only rookie in league history to do so twice. Her breakout performance established her as one of the league’s rising stars and a foundational piece for the Wings’ future.

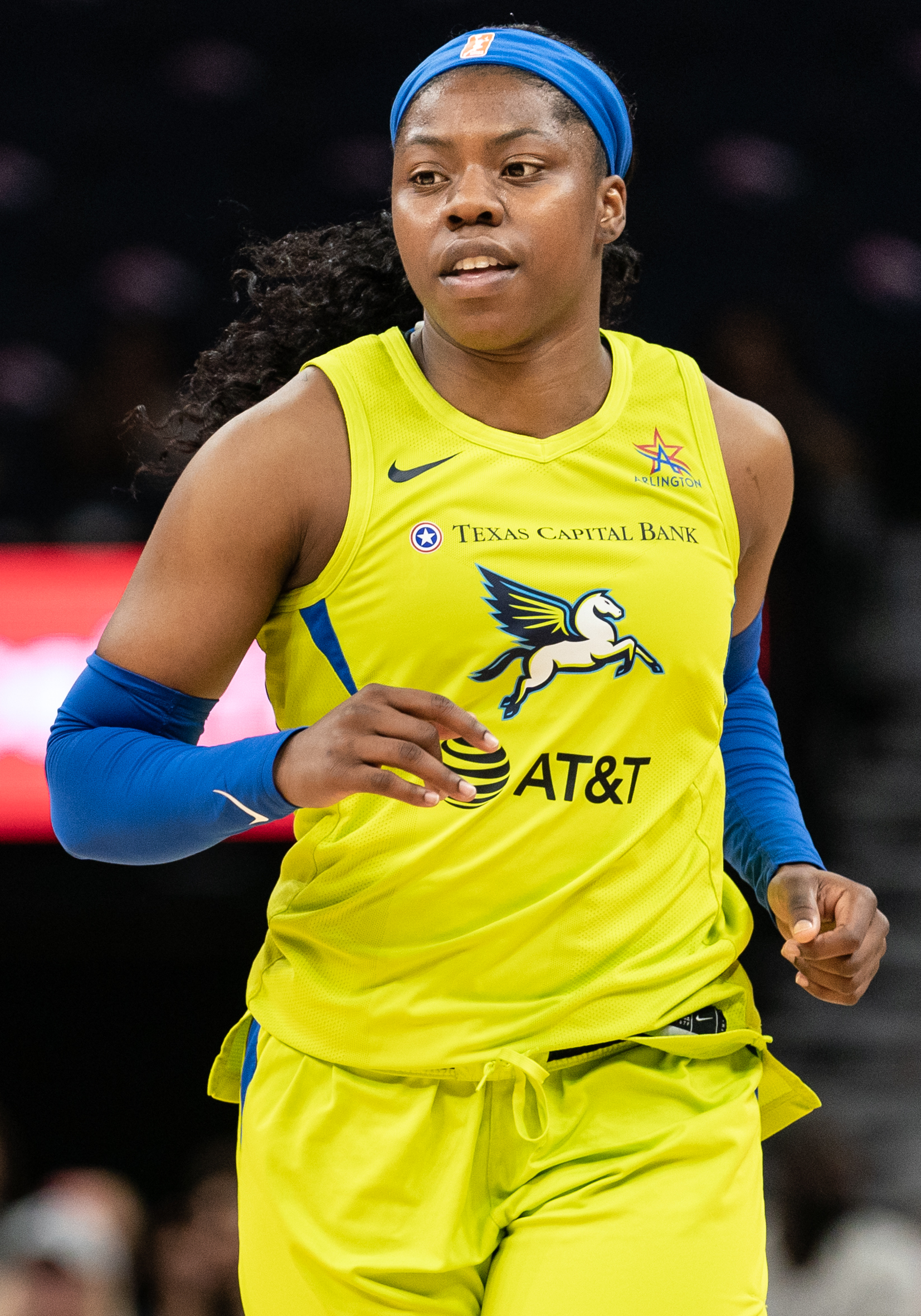
Arike Ogunbowale playing for the Wings in 2019.

On February 12, 2020, the Wings traded star guard Skylar Diggins to the Phoenix Mercury in exchange for the 5th and 7th overall picks in the 2020 WNBA draft, as well as a 2021 first-round pick. The latter was later traded to the Chicago Sky in exchange for center Astou Ndour. Originally scheduled to feature a record-high 36 regular-season games, the WNBA season was postponed on April 3 due to the COVID-19 pandemic. A revised plan was approved on June 15, with the league holding a shortened 22-game season at IMG Academy in Bradenton, Florida, without fans in attendance. The Wings opened their season on July 26 with a 105–95 loss to the Atlanta Dream. The team started the season competitively, winning two of their first three games. However, they soon entered a slump, suffering two separate three-game losing streaks that were interrupted by only a single win. The team recovered slightly, finishing August with a 3–3 record and holding a 6–10 mark overall. In September, the Wings went 2–4 but closed the season with a victory, ending the year with a 8–14 record and missing the playoffs for the second consecutive season. Despite the losing record, second-year guard Arike Ogunbowale led the WNBA in scoring with 22.8 points per game and was named to the All-WNBA First Team. Following the conclusion of the season, on October 14, it was announced that the Wings had mutually agreed to part ways with head coach Brian Agler after two seasons at the helm. On December 9, the Wings hired two-time All-Star Vickie Johnson as the new head coach; she previously served as an assistant coach for the Las Vegas Aces, where she helped guide the team to the best record in the WNBA.

In the 2021 WNBA draft, the Wings made history becoming the first team to hold both the first and second overall picks in the same draft. They selected Texas center Charli Collier with the No. 1 pick, international standout Awak Kuier at No. 2, and Arkansas guard Chelsea Dungee with the No. 5 pick. The Wings opened their season on May 14 with a 94–71 victory over the Los Angeles Sparks but struggled to maintain momentum, losing the next four games and finishing May with a 1–4 record. The team rebounded in June with a 7–5 record, highlighted by road wins against the Seattle Storm and a two-game sweep of the Phoenix Mercury. However, inconsistency returned in July as the Wings went 1–3, including three straight losses entering the Olympic break with a 9–12 overall record. Following the break, the Wings continued to battle inconsistency, going 2–3 in August while alternating wins and losses. They closed the regular season with a 3–3 mark in September, securing a playoff berth with a narrow 77–76 victory over the New York Liberty on September 11. The Wings finished the regular season at 14–18, earning the 7th seed and qualifying for the playoffs for the first time since 2018 despite dealing with injuries, inconsistency, and a learning curve for their rookies. In the first round of the playoffs, the Wings were eliminated by the eventual WNBA champions, the Chicago Sky, in a 81–64 loss.

The 2022 season began on May 7 with a 66–59 loss to the Atlanta Dream, but the Wings responded with back-to-back wins. After losing the fourth game of the season, Dallas went on a three-game winning streak before closing the month with two losses, finishing May with a 5–4 record. June was more challenging, as the team faced Las Vegas and Seattle in five of their first six games, going 1–4 in that stretch. They closed the month with a 3–3 run to post a 4–7 record in June. In July, every loss was followed by a win, except for two straight losses to Chicago, finishing the month 4–5. Dallas gained momentum in August, opening the month with four straight victories to clinch a playoff berth. On August 12, the team announced that leading scorer Arike Ogunbowale would miss the remainder of the regular season and the first round of the playoffs after undergoing iliac crest core muscle avulsion repair. The Wings finished the regular season 5–2 in her absence and closed the year at 18–18, securing the 6th seed in the playoffs. Their 18 wins were the most in a season since the team relocated to Dallas and matched their franchise-high last achieved in 2015 as the Tulsa Shock. In the first round of the playoffs, Dallas faced the third-seeded Connecticut Sun in a best-of-three series. After dropping Game 1 in Connecticut by 25 points (93–68), the Wings responded with a 10-point win (89–79) in Game 2 to force a decisive Game 3 in Dallas. However, the Wings struggled, scoring a season-low 58 points in a 73–58 loss that ended their playoff run. On September 19, the organization announced that it would not renew the contract of head coach Vickie Johnson. On November 7, the Wings named Los Angeles Sparks assistant coach Latricia Trammell as the team’s next head coach.

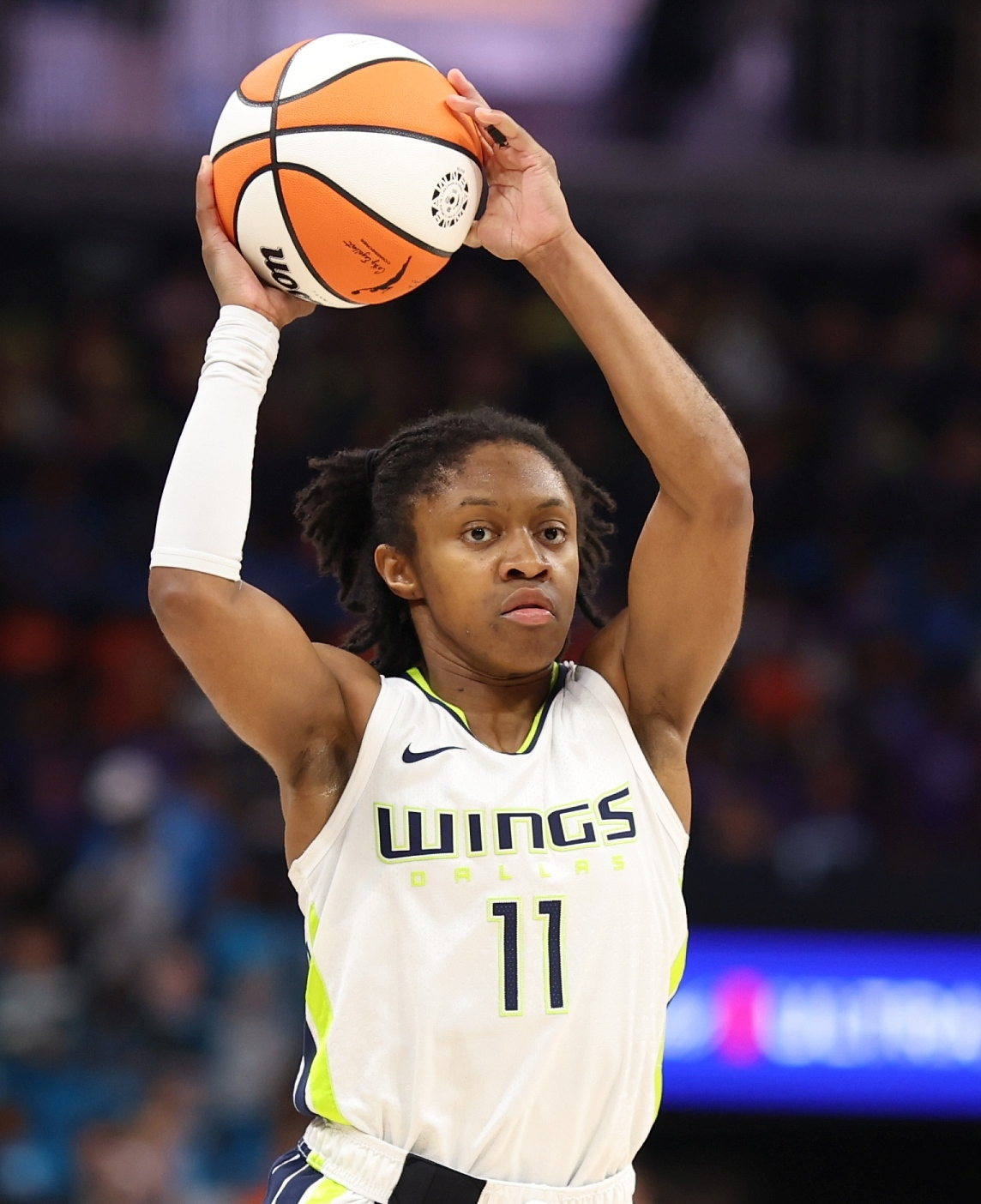
Crystal Dangerfield vs Minnesota Lynx in 2023.

The 2023 season began on a strong note, with the Wings winning their first two games and finishing May with a 3–1 record. However, momentum slowed in June, where the team lost its first two games before recovering with two wins. A subsequent three-game losing streak and a mixed finish resulted in a 4–7 record for the month, with three of those victories coming against the Phoenix Mercury. July saw a dramatic turnaround as the Wings won six of their first seven games, including a notable win over the Las Vegas Aces—only the second team to defeat the eventual top seed at that point in the season. Despite losing two of their final three games, Dallas closed the month with a 7–3 record. August was more inconsistent, ending with a 5–5 record. The team began September with a 110–100 victory over the Indiana Fever, clinching a playoff spot, and finished the month with a 3–2 record. Under first-year head coach Latricia Trammell, the Wings completed the regular season with a 22–18 record, earning the fourth seed in the playoffs. The 22 wins were the most in franchise history since relocating to Dallas and the highest overall since the 2008 season, when the franchise was still based in Detroit. In the first round of the playoffs, the Wings faced fifth seed Atlanta Dream, Dallas rallied from a 20-point deficit to win Game 1 and controlled Game 2 from start to finish, securing the franchise’s first playoff series win since 2009. In the semifinals, Dallas faced the top-seeded Las Vegas Aces in a best-of-five series. Game 1 was competitive early, with the Wings trailing by just four points at halftime before the Aces pulled away in the third quarter for a 91–84 win. In Game 2, Dallas staged a late comeback that ultimately fell short, losing 91–84 once again. Returning home for Game 3, the Wings led by five at halftime but were outscored in the second half, falling 64–61 and ending their season. Statistically, the Wings made significant strides in both offensive and defensive efficiency, leading the WNBA in rebounding and finishing second in total field goals made, trailing only Las Vegas. Forward Satou Sabally was named the Most Improved Player after posting career highs across the board, averaging 18.6 points, 8.1 rebounds, 4.4 assists, and 1.8 steals per game. She also earned a spot on the All-WNBA First Team.

On February 20, 2024, the Wings announced that forward Satou Sabally underwent a shoulder procedure after sustaining an injury while representing Germany at the Olympic Qualifying Tournament. Dallas opened the regular season on May 15 with an 87–79 win against the Chicago Sky and finished the month with a 3–3 record. However, the team unraveled in June, beginning an 11-game losing streak that stretched through nearly the entire month. While they forced an overtime game against the Phoenix Mercury on June 9, none of the other June losses were decided by fewer than five points. The Wings finally broke the streak with a win over the Minnesota Lynx on June 27 but ended the month 1–11. July provided little relief. After two more losses to begin the month, Dallas secured a narrow win over the Atlanta Dream but then dropped three more games before closing the month with a victory against the Indiana Fever. The Wings entered the Olympic break with a 6–19 record. Sabally returned following the break, but the team lost its first three games before stringing together a three-game winning streak to close out August—highlighted by an 18-point win over the Lynx on August 31. The momentum quickly faded in September. The Wings lost all nine of their final games, though they managed to force overtime in a close contest against the Dream on September 6 and lost by just two points to the Seattle Storm on September 13. They finished the season with a 9–31 record—just one game ahead of the Los Angeles Sparks to avoid last place. Their .225 winning percentage was the franchise’s worst since 2011. Defensively, Dallas struggled throughout the year, posting a league-worst defensive rating of 111.7—the worst in the WNBA since the 2020 Indiana Fever. Injuries and instability undermined any continuity, and the Wings fell from semifinalists in 2023 to the bottom tier of the standings in 2024.

=== 2025–present: The Paige Bueckers era ===
Ahead of the 2025 season, the Dallas Wings underwent significant changes to their coaching staff and front office. On October 18, 2024, the team announced the dismissal of head coach Latricia Trammell after two seasons. This was followed by the hiring of Curt Miller as Executive Vice President and General Manager on November 8. Miller previously served as head coach of the Los Angeles Sparks and held dual roles as head coach and general manager with the Connecticut Sun. On December 23, Chris Koclanes was named head coach, bringing more than a decade of assistant coaching experience at the WNBA and collegiate levels.

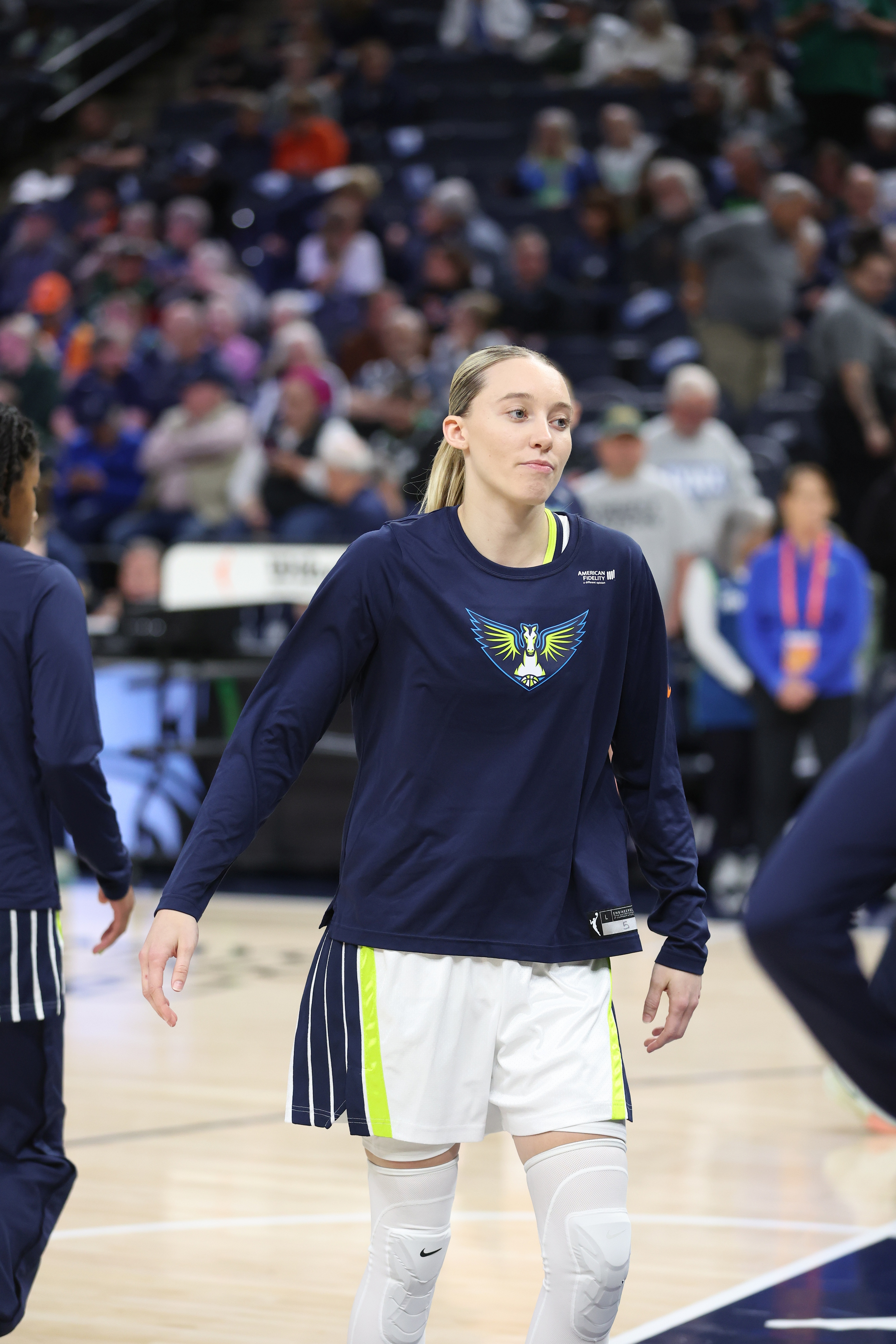
Paige Bueckers at the 2025 season opener against the Lynx.

On April 14, the Wings selected UConn guard Paige Bueckers with the No. 1 overall pick in the 2025 WNBA draft. Bueckers, widely regarded as a generational talent, had just led the Huskies to their 12th NCAA Championship eight days earlier. The Wings opened the season on May 16 with a 99–84 loss to the Minnesota Lynx and struggled out of the gate, losing their first four games. Their first win came on May 27 in a 109–87 victory over the Connecticut Sun, and they finished May with a 1–6 record. June began with five straight losses before the Wings briefly stabilized, finishing the month with a 4–7 record. However, the roster was soon hit by significant setbacks. On June 5, centers Teaira McCowan and Luisa Geiselsöder were announced to be temporarily suspended while participating in the 2025 FIBA Women’s EuroBasket for Turkey and Germany, respectively. On June 10, Tyasha Harris was ruled out for the season following knee surgery, and on June 16, Maddy Siegrist was diagnosed with a tibial plateau fracture in her right knee. Although surgery was not required, she would miss more than a month and 18 games before returning on August 5. The struggles continued into July, where Dallas posted a 3–7 record. August proved even more difficult, as the team went 1–11 during the month, with their sole victory coming in a narrow 81–80 win over the Indiana Fever. Despite the team’s poor overall performance, Bueckers delivered a historic individual effort on August 20, scoring 44 points in a one-point loss to the Los Angeles Sparks. Her performance set a WNBA rookie record and was the highest single-game point total by any player in the 2025 season. She also became the only player in league history to score 40 or more points while shooting 80% from the field. Dallas extended its losing streak into September, losing ten straight games before closing out the regular season with a 97–76 win over the Phoenix Mercury. That final game featured a milestone: rookies Bueckers, Okonkwo, and Aziaha James each scored 20 or more points, becoming the first rookie trio in WNBA history to accomplish that in a single game. Earlier that month, in a loss to the Golden State Valkyries, Bueckers became the franchise’s rookie scoring leader, surpassing Arike Ogunbowale’s previous record of 630 points. The Wings finished the season with a 10–34 record, placing last in the league standings. Due to injuries, international commitments, and ongoing roster instability, Dallas tied the WNBA record for the most players to appear in a single season (21) and matched the league record for the most different starting lineups used in a season (18), joining five other franchises in that distinction. Despite the team's poor performance, Bueckers quickly established herself as a star. She was named WNBA Rookie of the Year, was selected for the All-WNBA Second Team and the WNBA All-Rookie Team, broke multiple league and franchise rookie records, and became the only player in the season to rank in the league's top ten in points, assists, and steals per game.

On September 30, 2025, the team announced the firing of head coach Chris Koclanes after just one season. Jose Fernandez was officially announced as the new head coach on October 27, bringing more than 20 years of women's college basketball coaching experience. During free agency, the Wings re-signed Arike Ogunbowale and added Jessica Shepard and Alanna Smith to the roster. On April 13, 2026, the Wings selected UConn guard Azzi Fudd with the No. 1 overall pick in the 2026 WNBA draft. The team opened the 2026 season on May 9 with a 107–104 win over the Indiana Fever before losing their next two games. The Wings then recovered by winning four of their next five games to finish May with a 5–3 record, highlighted by a 95–87 win over the reigning champions Las Vegas Aces on May 28. The team opened June with a 79–56 win over the Seattle Storm on June 1 to improve to 6–3, marking the franchise's best start over the first nine games since relocating to Texas in 2016.

== Season-by-season records ==
Season	Team	Conference		Regular season			Playoff Results	Head coach
Season	Team	Conference		W	L	PCT	Playoff Results	Head coach
Detroit Shock
1998	1998	East	4th	17	13	.567	Did not qualify	Nancy Lieberman
1999	1999	East	2nd	15	17	.469	Lost Conference Semi-finals (Charlotte, 0–1)	Nancy Lieberman
2000	2000	East	5th	14	18	.438	Did not qualify	Nancy Lieberman
2001	2001	East	7th	10	22	.313	Did not qualify	Greg Williams
2002	2002	East	8th	9	23	.281	Did not qualify	G. Williams (0–10); B. Laimbeer (9–13)
2003	2003	East	1st	25	9	.735	Won Conference Semi-finals (Cleveland, 2–1); Won Conference Finals (Connecticut, 2–0); Won WNBA Finals (Los Angeles, 2–1)	Bill Laimbeer
2004	2004	East	3rd	17	17	.500	Lost Conference Semi-finals (New York, 1–2)	Bill Laimbeer
2005	2005	East	4th	16	18	.471	Lost Conference Semi-finals (Connecticut, 0–2)	Bill Laimbeer
2006	2006	East	2nd	23	11	.676	Won Conference Semi-finals (Indiana, 2–0); Won Conference Finals (Connecticut, 2–1); Won WNBA Finals (Sacramento, 3–2)	Bill Laimbeer
2007	2007	East	1st	24	10	.706	Won Conference Semi-finals (New York, 2–1); Won Conference Finals (Indiana, 2–1); Lost WNBA Finals (Phoenix, 2–3)	Bill Laimbeer
2008	2008	East	1st	22	12	.647	Won Conference Semi-finals (Indiana, 2–1); Won Conference Finals (New York, 2–1); Won WNBA Finals (San Antonio, 3–0)	Bill Laimbeer
2009	2009	East	3rd	18	16	.529	Won Conference Semi-finals (Atlanta, 2–0); Lost Conference Finals (Indiana, 1–2)	B. Laimbeer (1–3); R. Mahorn (17–13)
Tulsa Shock
2010	2010	West	6th	6	28	.176	Did not qualify	Nolan Richardson
2011	2011	West	6th	3	31	.088	Did not qualify	N. Richardson (1–10); T. Edwards (2–21)
2012	2012	West	5th	9	25	.265	Did not qualify	Gary Kloppenburg
2013	2013	West	6th	11	23	.324	Did not qualify	Gary Kloppenburg
2014	2014	West	5th	12	22	.353	Did not qualify	Fred Williams
2015	2015	West	3rd	18	16	.529	Lost Conference Semi-finals (Phoenix, 0–2)	Fred Williams
Dallas Wings
2016	2016	West	5th	11	23	.324	Did not qualify	Fred Williams
2017	2017	West	4th	16	18	.470	Lost in first round to Washington	Fred Williams
2018	2018	West	5th	15	19	.441	Lost in first round to Phoenix	F. Williams (14–17); T. McWilliams-Franklin (1–2)
2019	2019	West	6th	10	24	.294	Did not qualify	Brian Agler
2020	2020	West	6th	8	14	.364	Did not qualify	Brian Agler
2021	2021	West	5th	14	18	.438	Lost in first round to Chicago	Vickie Johnson
2022	2022	West	3rd	18	18	.500	Lost First round (Connecticut, 1–2)	Vickie Johnson
2023	2023	West	2nd	22	18	.550	Won First round (Atlanta, 2–0); Lost Second Round (Las Vegas, 0–3)	Latricia Trammell
2024	2024	West	5th	9	31	.225	Did not qualify	Latricia Trammell
2025	2025	West	7th	10	34	.227	Did not qualify	Chris Koclanes
2026	2026	West	7th	27	17	.614	Lost First round (Golden State, 1–3)	Jose Fernandez
Regular season				429	565	.432	4 Conference Championships	
Playoffs				34	32	.515	3 WNBA Championships	

== Players ==
=== Current roster ===
Dallas Wings roster
Players
Coaches

Pos.	No.	Nat.	Name	Height	Weight	DOB	From	Yrs
G	5	(United States)	Bueckers, Paige	6' 0" (1.83m)	141 lb (64kg)	2001-10-20	Connecticut	1
F	7	(Israel)	Clark, Alysha	5' 11" (1.8m)	167 lb (76kg)	1987-07-07	Middle Tennessee	13
G	35	(United States)	Fudd, Azzi	5' 11" (1.8m)	165 lb (75kg)	2002-11-11	Connecticut	R
G	10	(United States)	James, Aziaha	5' 10" (1.78m)		2002-11-19	NC State	1
G	2	(United States)	Kelly, Deja	5' 8" (1.73m)		2001-08-09	Oregon	R
F/C	34	(Finland)	Kuier, Awak	6' 4" (1.93m)	168 lb (76kg)	2001-08-19	Mäkelänrinne	3
G	33	(Latvia)	Laksa, Kitija	6' 1" (1.85m)		1996-05-21	South Florida	1
C	28	(China)	Li Yueru	6' 7" (2.01m)		1999-03-28	China	3
G	24	(United States)	Ogunbowale, Arike	5' 8" (1.73m)	165 lb (75kg)	1997-03-02	Notre Dame	7
F	32	(Slovenia)	Shepard, Jessica	6' 4" (1.93m)	175 lb (79kg)	1996-09-11	Notre Dame	5
F	20	(United States)	Siegrist, Maddy	6' 2" (1.88m)	175 lb (79kg)	2000-05-22	Villanova	3
G	1	(United States)	Sims, Odyssey	5' 8" (1.73m)	155 lb (70kg)	1992-07-13	Baylor	12
C	8	(Australia)	Smith, Alanna	6' 4" (1.93m)	177 lb (80kg)	1996-09-10	Stanford	7
G	6	(Italy)	Verona, Costanza	5' 6" (1.68m)		1999-08-06	Italy	R
G	31	(United States)	Williams, Christyn	5' 11" (1.8m)	174 lb (79kg)	2000-05-20	Connecticut	1
G	–	(Mexico)	Lopez Sénéchal, Lou (S)	6' 1" (1.85m)	155 lb (70kg)	1998-05-12	Connecticut	1

Head coach
(United States) Jose Fernandez (FIU)
Assistant coaches
(United States) Camille Smith (North Carolina)
(United States) Mike Neighbors (Arkansas)
(United States) David Adkins (Radford)
(United States) Empress Davenport (Texas)

Legend

- (C) Team captain
- (DP) Unsigned draft pick
- (FA) Free agent
- (S) Suspended
- Injured

WNBA roster page

East
ATL
CHI
CON
IND
NY
TOR
WAS
West
DAL
GS
LV
LA
MIN
PHO
POR
SEA

=== Former players ===
Sorted by team for which they last played

==== Detroit Shock ====
- Jennifer Azzi (1999)
- Carla Boyd (1998–1999, 2001)
- Sandy Brondello (1998–1999), now the head coach of the Toronto Tempo and the Australia national team
- Dominique Canty (1999–2002)
- Swin Cash (2002–2007), now the vice president of Basketball Operations and Team Development for the New Orleans Pelicans
- Barbara Farris (2000–2005, 2009)
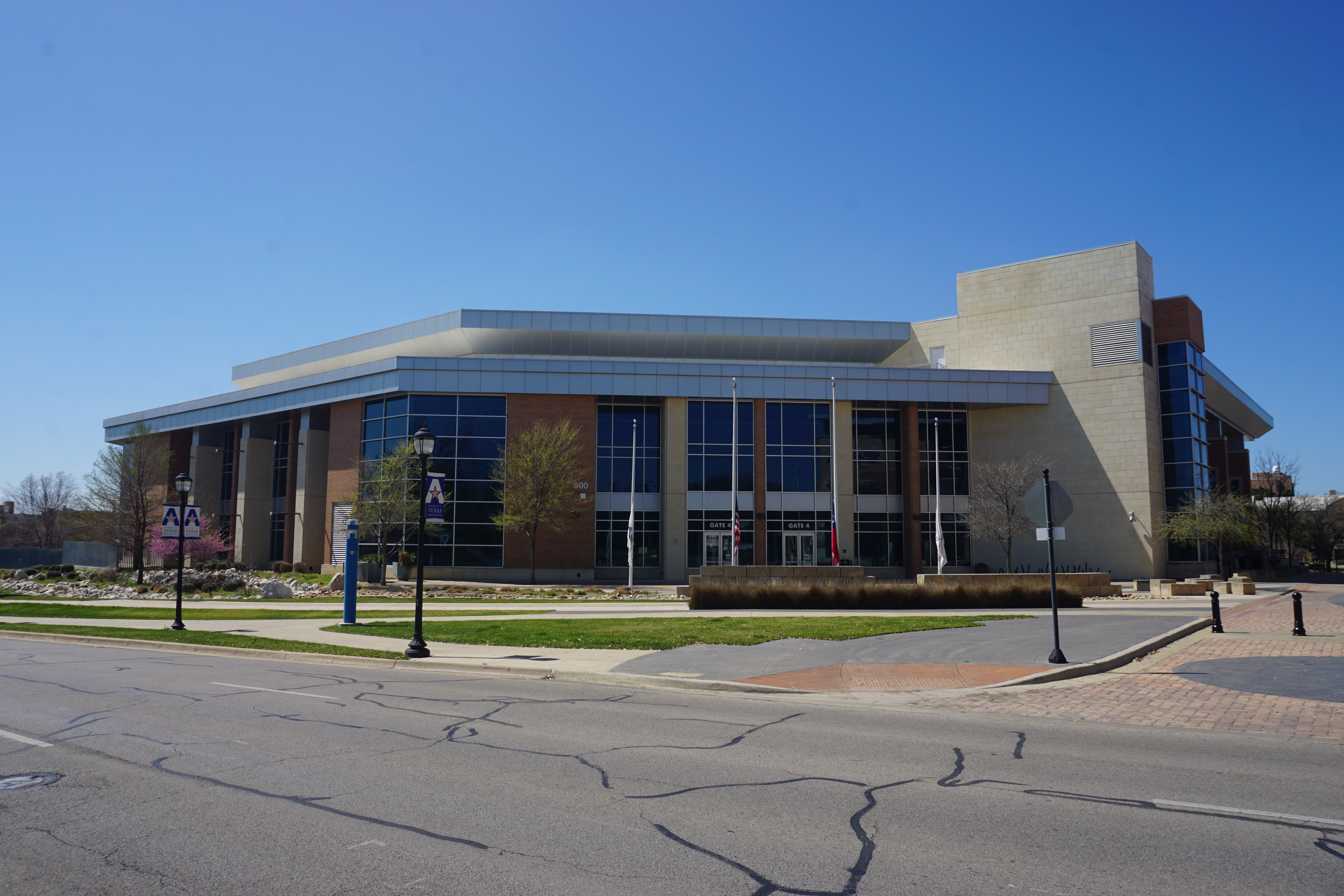
  College Park Center, home of the Wings
- Cheryl Ford (2003–2008)
- Tasha Humphrey (2008)
- Shannon Johnson (2007)
- Taj McWilliams-Franklin (2008–2009, also interim Head Coach for the Wings in 2018)
- Astou Ndiaye-Diatta (1999–2003)
- Deanna Nolan (2001–2009)
- Wendy Palmer (1999–2002)
- Elaine Powell (2002–2008)
- Ruth Riley (2003–2006)
- Sheri Sam (2008)
- Katie Smith (2005–2009), now an assistant coach for the Ohio State Buckeyes women's basketball

==== Tulsa Shock ====
- Kara Braxton (2005–2010)
- Alexis Hornbuckle (2008–2010)
- Temeka Johnson (2012)
- Marion Jones (2010–2011)
- Ivory Latta (2007, 2010–2012)
- Kayla Pedersen (2011–2013)
- Nicole Powell (2013), now the head coach of the UC Riverside Highlanders women's basketball
- Sheryl Swoopes (2011)
- Shavonte Zellous (2009–2010)

==== Dallas Wings ====
- Liz Cambage (2011, 2013, 2018)
- Skylar Diggins (2013–2019), now with the Chicago Sky
- Allisha Gray (2017–2022), now with the Atlanta Dream
- Isabelle Harrison (2019–2022), now with the New York Liberty
- Moriah Jefferson (2019–2022), now with the Chicago Sky
- Glory Johnson (2012–2019)
- Marina Mabrey (2020–2022), now with the Toronto Tempo
- Courtney Paris (2012–2017), now an assistant coach for the New York Liberty
- Odyssey Sims (2014–2016; 2023–2024)
- Kayla Thornton (2017–2022), now with the Golden State Valkyries

== Coaches and staff ==
=== Owners ===
- William Davidson, owner of the Detroit Pistons (1998–2009)
- Tulsa Pro Hoops LLC, composed of Bill Cameron, David Box, Chris Christian, Sam and Rita Combs, and Paula Marshall
- Bill Cameron (majority owner) is chairman and Chris Christian is vice chairman/managing partner and Mark Yancey (2015–present)
- University of Texas at Arlington is a university, part of the University of Texas System

=== Head coaches ===
Detroit Shock Head Coaches
Name	Start	End	Seasons	Regular season				Playoffs			
Name	Start	End	Seasons	W	L	PCT	G	W	L	PCT	G
Nancy Lieberman	January 12, 1998	August 28, 2000	3	46	48	.489	94	0	1	.000	1
Greg Williams	September 20, 2000	June 19, 2002	2	10	32	.238	42	0	0	.000	0
Bill Laimbeer	June 19, 2002	July 15, 2009	8	137	93	.596	230	27	16	.628	43
Rick Mahorn	July 15, 2009	end of 2009	1	17	13	.567	30	3	2	.600	5
Tulsa Shock Head Coaches
Nolan Richardson	September 29, 2009	July 8, 2011	2	7	38	.156	45	0	0	.000	0
Teresa Edwards	July 8, 2011	January 3, 2012	1	2	21	.087	23	0	0	.000	0
Gary Kloppenburg	January 3, 2012	October 15, 2013	2	20	48	.313	68	0	0	.000	0
Dallas Wings Head Coaches
Fred Williams	January 23, 2014	August 13, 2018	5	71	96	.425	167	0	3	.000	3
Taj McWilliams-Franklin	August 13, 2018	December 18, 2018	1	1	2	.333	3	0	1	.000	1
Brian Agler	December 18, 2018	October 14, 2020	2	18	38	.321	56	0	0	.000	0
Vickie Johnson	December 9, 2020	September 19, 2022	2	32	36	.471	68	1	2	.333	3
Latricia Trammell	November 7, 2022	October 18, 2024	2	31	49	.388	80	2	3	.400	5
Chris Koclanes	December 23, 2024	September 30, 2025	1	10	34	.227	44	0	0	.000	0
Jose Fernandez	October 27, 2025										
Interim head coach

=== General managers ===
- Nancy Lieberman (1998–2000)
- Greg Williams (2000–2002)
- Bill Laimbeer (2002–2009)
- Cheryl Reeve (2009)
- Nolan Richardson (2010–2011)
- Teresa Edwards (2011)
- Gary Kloppenburg (2012–2013)
- Fred Williams (2014–2015)
- Greg Bibb (2016–2024)
- Curt Miller (2025–present)

=== Assistant coaches ===
- Steve Smith (1998–2001)
- Greg Williams (1998–2000)
- Tom Cross (2001–2002)
- Frank Schneider (2002)
- Laurie Byrd (2003–2005)
- Pam McGee (2003)
- Korie Hlede (2004)
- Rick Mahorn (2005–2009)
- Cheryl Reeve (2006–2009)
- Tammy Bagby (2010)
- Wayne Stehlik (2010–2011)
- Teresa Edwards (2011)
- Tracy Murray (2011)
- Kathy McConnell-Miller (2011–2012)
- Jason Glover (2012–2013)
- Stacey Lovelace-Tolbert (2013)
- Bridget Pettis (2014–2017)
- Ed Baldwin (2014–2016)
- Taj McWilliams-Franklin (2017–2018)
- Erin Phillips (2018–2020)
- Travis Charles (2018–2020)
- Crystal Robinson (2019–2020)
- Le'Coe Willingham (2021–2022)
- Kelly Schumacher (2021–2022)
- Tim Gittens (2021–2022)
- Brandi Poole (2023–2024)
- April (McDivitt) Schilling (2023)
- Courtney Paris (2023–2024)
- Zak Buncik (2024)
- Nola Henry (2025)
- Camille Smith (2025–present)
- Belle Koclanes (2025–present)

=== Hall of Famers ===
- Nancy Lieberman, enshrined 1996
- Lynette Woodard, enshrined 2004

== Statistics ==
Dallas Wings statistics
1990s

Season	Individual			Team vs Opponents		
Season	PPG	RPG	APG	PPG	RPG	FG%
1998	S. Brondello (14.2)	C. Brown (10.0)	S. Brondello (3.3)	69.6 vs 69.3	35.9 vs 31.6	.411 vs .411
1999	S. Brondello (13.3)	V. Whiting-Raymond (6.7)	J. Azzi (3.8)	70.0 vs 72.0	31.1 vs 32.2	.401 vs .437

2000s

Season	Individual			Team vs Opponents		
Season	PPG	RPG	APG	PPG	RPG	FG%
2000	W. Palmer (13.8)	W. Palmer (6.8)	D. Canty (2.9)	72.8 vs 75.8	30.8 vs 30.3	.438 vs .460
2001	A. Ndiaye-Diatta (11.8)	W. Palmer (7.0)	E. Brown (2.7)	65.7 vs 70.9	29.5 vs 30.7	.404 vs .462
2002	S. Cash (14.8)	S. Cash (6.9)	D. Canty (3.0)	66.1 vs 70.8	33.7 vs 30.7	.399 vs .417
2003	S. Cash (16.6)	C. Ford (10.4)	E. Powell (3.9)	75.1 vs 70.4	36.2 vs 31.3	.450 vs .399
2004	S. Cash (16.4)	C. Ford (9.6)	E. Powell (4.5)	69.6 vs 70.0	34.4 vs 31.0	.417 vs .410
2005	D. Nolan (15.9)	C. Ford (9.8)	D. Nolan (3.7)	66.1 vs 67.3	35.7 vs 29.9	.403 vs .403
2006	C. Ford (13.8)	C. Ford (11.3)	D. Nolan (3.6)	74.3 vs 70.1	37.8 vs 31.9	.414 vs .388
2007	D. Nolan (16.3)	S. Cash (6.1)	D. Nolan (3.9)	79.3 vs 74.7	38.6 vs 32.0	.430 vs .396
2008	D. Nolan (15.8)	C. Ford (8.7)	D. Nolan (4.4)	78.6 vs 74.2	36.7 vs 31.9	.424 vs .405
2009	D. Nolan (16.9)	C. Ford (7.4)	D. Nolan (3.5)	78.0 vs 77.8	36.1 vs 32.4	.430 vs .410

2010s

Season	Individual			Team vs Opponents		
Season	PPG	RPG	APG	PPG	RPG	FG%
2010	I. Latta (12.4)	C. Black (6.5)	I. Latta (3.9)	78.0 vs 89.8	31.6 vs 37.5	.424 vs .470
2011	T. Jackson (12.4)	T. Jackson (8.4)	I. Latta (3.2)	69.2 vs 82.1	30.7 vs 32.6	.396 vs .484
2012	I. Latta (14.3)	G. Johnson (6.8)	T. Johnson (4.7)	77.2 vs 84.2	29.5 vs 37.1	.405 vs .477
2013	L. Cambage (16.3)	G. Johnson (8.9)	S. Diggins (3.8)	77.0 vs 79.2	32.8 vs 35.7	.405 vs .451
2014	S. Diggins-Smith (20.1)	C. Paris (10.2)	S. Diggins-Smith (5.0)	81.3 vs 83.3	34.6 vs 33.8	.428 vs .468
2015	S. Diggins-Smith (17.8)	C. Paris (9.3)	S. Diggins-Smith (5.0)	77.7 vs 77.1	35.6 vs 33.6	.395 vs .445
2016	O. Sims (14.0)	G. Johnson (8.9)	O. Sims (3.9)	82.6 vs 88.2	34.1 vs 36.2	.400 vs .476
2017	S. Diggins-Smith (18.5)	G. Johnson (9.1)	S. Diggins-Smith (5.8)	86.1 vs 88.8	34.5 vs 34.7	.406 vs .481
2018	L. Cambage (23.0)	L. Cambage (9.7)	S. Diggins-Smith (6.2)	86.6 vs 85.4	36.6 vs 32.2	.441 vs .448
2019	A. Ogunbowale (19.1)	I. Harrison (5.8)	A. Ogunbowale (3.2)	71.6 vs 77.4	33.9 vs 33.5	.389 vs .430

2020s

Season	Individual			Team vs Opponents		
Season	PPG	RPG	APG	PPG	RPG	FG%
2020	A. Ogunbowale (22.8)	S. Sabally (7.8)	A. Ogunbowale (3.5)	83.4 vs 87.0	32.7 vs 36.5	.415 vs .471
2021	A. Ogunbowale (18.7)	I. Harrison / S. Sabally (5.9)	A. Ogunbowale (3.3)	81.1 vs. 81.7	36.1 vs. 33.6	.420 vs. .449
2022	A. Ogunbowale (19.7)	T. McCowan (7.0)	M. Mabrey (3.7)	82.9 vs. 82.8	33.8 vs. 32.7	.435 vs. .459
2023	A. Ogunbowale (21.2)	T. McCowan (9.1)	A. Ogunbowale (4.5)	87.9 vs. 84.9	38.7 vs. 32.1	.443 vs. .444
2024	A. Ogunbowale (22.2)	T. McCowan (8.1)	O. Sims (5.6)	84.2 vs 92.1	34.8 vs 33.0	.446 vs .475
2025	P. Bueckers (19.2)	M. Hines-Allen (6.0)	P. Bueckers (5.4)	81.7 vs 88.0	35.4 vs 34.5	.423 vs .459

== Media coverage ==
Currently, KFAA-TV broadcast the majority of Wings games. Prior to 2025, Bally Sports Southwest or Bally Sports Southwest Plus broadcast the majority of games. Previously, while in Tulsa, some Shock games were broadcast locally on The Cox Channel (COX). Some games are broadcast nationally on ESPN, ESPN2, Ion Television (locally through KPXD-TV), CBS (locally through KTVT), ABC (locally through WFAA), NBC (locally through KXAS-TV), Amazon Prime Video, USA, NBCSN, and NBA TV.

== All-time notes ==
=== Regular season attendance ===
- A sellout for a basketball game at The Palace of Auburn Hills (Detroit) is 22,076.
- A sellout for a basketball game at BOK Center (Tulsa) is 17,839.
- A sellout for a basketball game at College Park Center (Dallas) is 7,000

Regular season all-time attendance
Detroit Shock
Year	Average	High	Low	Sellouts	Total for year	WNBA game average
1998	10,229 (6th)	16,246	7,102	0	153,434	10,869
1999	8,485 (9th)	12,378	6,771	0	135,753	10,207
2000	6,716 (13th)	10,147	4,480	0	107,449	9,074
2001	6,834 (14th)	13,378	4,013	0	109,348	9,105
2002	5,886 (16th)	10,893	3,315	0	94,171	9,228
2003	7,862 (9th)	12,414	3,532	0	133,647	8,826
2004	9,462 (4th)	14,435	6,542	0	160,860	8,589
2005	9,374 (3rd)	14,932	5,635	0	159,356	8,172
2006	9,643 (1st)	12,985	6,932	0	163,924	7,476
2007	9,749 (1st)	14,109	7,421	0	165,738	7,819
2008	9,569 (1st)	15,210	6,842	0	162,669	7,948
2009	8,011 (5th)	14,439	5,239	0	136,184	8,029
Tulsa Shock
Year	Average	High	Low	Sellouts	Total for year	WNBA game average
2010	4,812 (11th)	7,806	3,333	0	81,811	7,834
2011	4,828 (12th)	7,509	3,435	0	82,069	7,954
2012	5,203 (12th)	7,509	4,102	0	88,453	7,452
2013	5,474 (12th)	7,381	4,107	0	93,055	7,531
2014	5,566 (12th)	7,256	4,107	0	94,626	7,578
2015	5,168 (11th)	7,256	4,145	0	87,854	7,184
Dallas Wings
Year	Average	High	Low	Sellouts	Total for year	WNBA game average
2016	5,298 (12th)	7,275	4,027	1	90,060	7,655
2017	3,872 (12th)	5,169	2,805	0	65,824	7,716
2018	4,752 (10th)	6,459	3,483	0	80,782	6,721
2019	4,999 (8th)	6,885	3,562	0	84,988	6,535
2020	Due to the COVID-19 pandemic, the season was played in Bradenton, Florida without fans.					
2021	2,101 (8th)	3,604	1,372	0	33,617	2,636
2022	3,788 (10th)	5,796	2,791	0	68,181	5,679
2023	4,641 (9th)	6,251	3,392	2	92,811	6,615
2024	5,911 (11th)	6,251	5,129	8	118,217	9,807
2025	7,272 (11th)	20,409	5,228	1	159,998	10,986

=== Draft picks ===
- 1998 Expansion Draft: Rhonda Blades (1), Tajama Abraham (3), Tara Williams (5), Lynette Woodard (7)
- 1998: Korie Hlede (4), Rachael Sporn (14), Gergana Branzova (24), Sandy Brondello (34)
- 1999: Jennifer Azzi (5), Val Whiting (17), Dominique Canty (29), Astou Ndiaye-Diatta (41)
- 2000: Edwina Brown (3), Tamicha Jackson (8), Chevonne Hammond (44), Cal Bouchard (60)
- 2001: Deanna Nolan (6), Jae Kingi (22), Svetlana Volnaya (38), Kelly Santos (54)
- 2002: Swin Cash (2), Lanae Williams (18), Ayana Walker (20), Jill Chapman (21), Kathy Wambe (22), Ericka Haney (47)
- 2003 Miami/Portland Dispersal Draft: Ruth Riley (1)
- 2003: Cheryl Ford (3), Kara Lawson (5), Syreeta Bromfield (28)
- 2004 Cleveland Dispersal Draft: Jennifer Rizzotti (13)
- 2004: Iciss Tillis (11), Shereka Wright (13), Erika Valek (23), Jennifer Smith (32)
- 2005: Kara Braxton (7), Dionnah Jackson (13), Nikita Bell (20), Jenni Lingor (33)
- 2006: Ambrosia Anderson (17), Zane Teillane (35)
- 2007 Charlotte Dispersal Draft: selection waived
- 2007: Ivory Latta (11)
- 2008: Alexis Hornbuckle (4), Tasha Humphrey (11), Olayinka Sanni (18), Natasha Lacy (28), Valeriya Berezhynska (42)
- 2009 Houston Dispersal Draft: selection waived
- 2009: Shavonte Zellous (11), Brittany Miller (18), Tanae Davis-Cain (37)
- 2010 Sacramento Dispersal Draft: Scholanda Robinson (7)
- 2010: Amanda Thompson (19), Vivian Frieson (31)
- 2011: Liz Cambage (2), Kayla Pedersen (7), Italee Lucas (21), Chastity Reed (25)
- 2012: Glory Johnson (4), Riquna Williams (17), Vicki Baugh (25), Lynetta Kizer (29)
- 2013: Skylar Diggins (3), Angel Goodrich (29)
- 2014: Odyssey Sims (2), Jordan Hooper (13), Theresa Plaisance (27)
- 2015: Amanda Zahui B. (2), Brianna Kiesel (13), Mimi Mungedi (25)
- 2016: Aerial Powers (5), Ruth Hamblin (18), Shakena Richardson (30)
- 2017: Evelyn Akhator (3), Allisha Gray (4), Kaela Davis (10), Breanna Lewis (23), Saniya Chong (26)
- 2018: Azurá Stevens (6), Loryn Goodwin (18), Natalie Butler (30)
- 2019: Arike Ogunbowale (5), Megan Gustafson (17), Kennedy Burke (22), Morgan Bertsch (29)
- 2020: Satou Sabally (2), Bella Alarie (5), Tyasha Harris (7), Luisa Geiselsöder (21)
- 2021: Charli Collier (1), Awak Kuier (2), Chelsea Dungee (5), Dana Evans (13)
- 2022: Veronica Burton (7), Jasmine Dickey (30), Jazz Bond (31)
- 2023: Maddy Siegrist (3), Lou Lopez Sénéchal (5), Abby Meyers (11), Ashley Joens (19), Paige Robinson (31)
- 2024: Jacy Sheldon (5), Carla Leite (9), Ashley Owusu (33)
- 2025: Paige Bueckers (1), Aziaha James (12), Madison Scott (14), JJ Quinerly (27), Aaronette Vonleh (31)

=== Trades ===
- July 29, 1999: The Shock traded Korie Hlede and Cindy Brown to the Utah Starzz in exchange for Wendy Palmer and Olympia Scott-Richardson.
- April 24, 2000: The Shock traded Jennifer Azzi and the 12th pick in the 2000 Draft to the Utah Starzz in exchange for the third and eighth picks in the 2000 Draft.
- April 20, 2001: The Shock traded Val Whiting to the Minnesota Lynx in exchange for a second-round pick in the 2002 Draft.
- April 24, 2001: The Shock traded Anna DeForge to the Houston Comets in exchange for Jennifer Rizzotti.
- May 13, 2001: The Shock traded Tamicha Jackson to the Portland Fire in exchange for a second-round pick in the 2002 Draft.
- May 27, 2001: The Shock traded Jennifer Rizzotti to the Cleveland Rockers in exchange for a third-round pick in the 2002 Draft.
- May 27, 2001: The Shock traded Olympia Scott-Richardson and a third-round pick in the 2002 Draft to the Indiana Fever in exchange for a second-round pick in the 2002 Draft.
- May 3, 2002: The Shock traded Claudia das Neves to the Phoenix Mercury in exchange for a fourth-round pick in the 2003 Draft.
- May 11, 2002: The Shock traded a fourth-round pick in the 2003 Draft to the Sacramento Monarchs in exchange for Stacy Clinesmith.
- July 7, 2002: The Shock traded Wendy Palmer and a second-round pick in the 2003 Draft to the Orland Miracle in exchange for Elaine Powell and a first-round pick in the 2003 Draft.
- April 27, 2003: The Shock traded Dominique Canty to the Houston Comets in exchange for Allison Curtin.
- April 28, 2003: The Shock traded Edwina Brown and Lanae Williams to the Phoenix Mercury in exchange for Telisha Quarles and Petra Ujhelyi.
- April 29, 2003: The Shock traded Kara Lawson to the Sacramento Monarchs in exchange for Kendra Holland-Corn.
- May 19, 2003: The Shock traded a third-round pick in the 2004 Draft to the Minnesota Lynx in exchange for Tamara Moore.
- July 31, 2003: The Shock traded Tamara Moore to the Phoenix Mercury in exchange for Stacey Thomas.
- February 11, 2004: The Shock traded Kendra-Holland Corn and the 26th pick in the 2004 Draft to the Houston Comets in exchange for the 11th and the 32nd picks in the 2004 Draft.
- April 17, 2004: The Shock traded Shereka Wright, Sheila Lambert and Erika Valek to the Phoenix Mercury in exchange for Chandi Jones.
- April 14, 2005: The Shock traded Iciss Tillis to the Washington Mystics in exchange for the 13th pick in the 2005 Draft.
- June 29, 2005: The Shock traded Andrea Stinson and a second-round pick in the 2006 Draft to the Phoenix Mercury in exchange for Plenette Pierson.
- July 30, 2005: The Shock traded Chandi Jones, Stacey Thomas, and a first-round pick in the 2006 Draft to the Minnesota Lynx in exchange for Katie Smith and a second-round pick in the 2006 Draft.
- April 5, 2006: The Shock traded Ambrosia Anderson and a second-round pick in the 2007 Draft to the Minnesota Lynx in exchange for Jacqueline Batteast and a third-round pick in the 2007 Draft.
- May 18, 2006: The Shock traded two third-round picks in the 2007 Draft to the Phoenix Mercury in exchange for Angelina Williams.
- February 22, 2007: The Shock traded Ruth Riley to the San Antonio Silver Stars in exchange for Katie Feenstra and the right to swap first-round picks in the 2008 Draft.
- February 6, 2008: The Shock traded Ivory Latta to the Atlanta Dream in exchange for LaToya Thomas and the 18th pick in the 2008 Draft.
- February 19, 2008: The Shock traded Swin Cash to the Seattle Storm in exchange for the fourth pick in the 2008 Draft.
- June 22, 2008: The Shock traded LaToya Thomas to the Minnesota Lynx in exchange for Eshaya Murphy.
- August 12, 2008: The Shock traded Eshaya Murphy, Tasha Humphrey, and a second-round pick in the 2009 Draft to the Washington Mystics in exchange for Taj McWilliams-Franklin.
- April 9, 2009: The Shock traded Ashley Shields to the Atlanta Dream in exchange for the 18th pick in the 2009 Draft.
- April 7, 2010: The Shock traded the seventh pick in the 2010 Draft and a second-round pick in the 2011 Draft to the Connecticut Sun in exchange for Chante Black and Amber Holt.
- April 14, 2010: The Shock traded Crystal Kelly to the San Antonio Silver Stars in exchange for Shanna Crossley.
- May 27, 2010: The Shock traded Shavonte Zellous to the Indiana Fever in exchange for a second-round pick in the 2011 Draft.
- June 14, 2010: The Shock traded Plenette Pierson to the New York Liberty in exchange for Tiffany Jackson.
- July 22, 2010: The Shock traded Kara Braxton to the Phoenix Mercury in exchange for Nicole Ohlde and a first-round pick in the 2011 Draft.
- July 26, 2010: The Shock traded Alexis Hornbuckle to the Minnesota Lynx in exchange for Rashanda McCants.
- February 1, 2011: The Shock traded a second-round pick in the 2012 Draft to the Los Angeles Sparks in exchange for Andrea Riley.
- May 2, 2011: The Shock traded Scholanda Robinson to the San Antonio Silver Stars in exchange for second- and third-round picks in the 2012 Draft.
- January 12, 2012: The Shock traded Andrea Riley to the Phoenix Mercury in exchange for Temeka Johnson.
- July 2, 2012: The Shock traded Karima Christmas to the Indiana Fever in exchange for Roneeka Hodges.
- March 1, 2013: The Shock traded Deanna Nolan, a second-round pick, and a third-round pick in the 2013 Draft to the New York Liberty in exchange for Nicole Powell. As part of the three-team trade, the Shock also traded their second-round pick in the 2014 Draft to the Minnesota Lynx in exchange for Candice Wiggins.
- June 20, 2013: The Shock traded Kayla Pedersen to the Connecticut Sun in exchange for a second-round pick in the 2014 Draft.
- March 1, 2016: The Wings traded Riquna Williams and the 6th pick in the 2016 Draft to the Los Angeles Sparks in exchange for Erin Phillips, the 5th pick in the 2016 Draft, and a first-round pick in the 2017 Draft.
- May 11, 2016: The Wings traded Amanda Zahui B. and a second-round pick in the 2017 Draft to the New York Liberty in exchange for a first-round pick in the 2017 Draft.
- February 17, 2017: The Wings traded Odyssey Sims and the 11th pick in the 2017 Draft to the Los Angeles Sparks in exchange for the 4th overall pick and a second-round pick in the 2017 Draft.
- July 23, 2018: The Wings traded Ariel Powers to the Washington Mystics for Tayler Hill, and a 2019 second round draft pick, with the option to trade first round picks.
- May 16, 2019 The Wings traded Liz Cambage to the Las Vegas Aces for Moriah Jefferson, Isabelle Harrison, the Aces' first and second round picks in the 2020 Draft.
- May 16, 2019 The Wings traded their third round pick in the 2020 Draft to Atlanta Dream for Imani McGee-Stafford.
- February 12, 2020 The Wings traded Skylar Diggins to Phoenix in exchange for the 5th and 7th picks in the 2020 Draft and Phoenix's first round pick in the 2021 Draft.
- February 12, 2020 The Wings traded the first round pick in the 2021 Draft acquired from Phoenix to Chicago in exchange for Astou Ndour.
- February 14, 2020 The Wings traded Azurá Stevens to Chicago in exchange for Chicago's first round pick in the 2021 Draft and Katie Lou Samuelson.
- February 21, 2020 The Wings traded their second round pick in the 2021 Draft to Los Angeles in exchange for Marina Mabrey.
- April 15, 2020 In a three team trade, the Wings acquired Washington's first round pick in the 2021 Draft and New York's second round pick in the 2021 Draft in exchange for Tayler Hill, the 9th pick, and the 15th pick of the 2020 Draft.
- May 26, 2020 The Wings traded a third round pick in the 2021 Draft and Kristine Anigwe to Los Angeles for a second round pick in the 2021 Draft.
- February 10, 2021 The Wings traded Katie Lou Samuelson and a second round pick in the 2022 Draft to Seattle in exchange for the first pick in the 2021 Draft.
- April 14, 2021 The Wings traded the seventh pick in the 2021 Draft and a second round pick in the 2022 Draft to Los Angeles for a first round pick in the 2022 Draft.
- June 2, 2021 The Wings traded Dana Evans to Chicago in exchange for Chicago's third round pick in the 2022 Draft, the right to swap 2022 first round picks, and Shayla Heal.
- March 8, 2022 The Wings traded the 4th and 6th picks in the 2022 Draft and their first round pick in the 2023 Draft for Teaira McCowan, the 7th pick in the 2022 Draft and the Chicago Sky's First Round pick in the 2023 Draft.
- January 16, 2023 The Wings traded Kayla Thornton to New York and Tyasha Harris to Connecticut in exchange for Natasha Howard and Crystal Dangerfield.
- January 21, 2023 The Wings traded Allisha Gray to the Atlanta Dream in exchange for the third overall pick in the 2023 Draft and Atlanta's first round pick in the 2025 Draft.
- February 11, 2023 The Wings acquired Diamond DeShields, Chicago's first round picks in the 2023 and 2024 Draft, and the right to swap first round picks in the 2025 Draft in exchange for Marina Mabrey.
- May 4, 2024 The Wings acquired Atlanta's 3rd round pick in the 2025 Draft in exchange for Crystal Dangerfield.
- February 2, 2025 In a four team trade, the Wings acquired DiJonai Carrington, Tyasha Harris, NaLyssa Smith, the twelfth overall pick in the 2025 WNBA draft, the right to swap third round picks with Indiana in the 2027 draft, and the rights to Mikiah Herbert Harrigan in exchange for Jacy Sheldon, Jaelyn Brown, Satou Sabally, Kalani Brown, and Sevgi Uzun.
- June 14, 2025 The Wings acquired Li Yueru in exchange for their 2026 second round draft pick and their 2027 third round draft pick.
- June 30, 2025 The Wings acquired the Las Vegas Aces' 2027 first round draft pick in exchange for NaLyssa Smith.
- August 3, 2025 The Wings acquired Diamond Miller, Karlie Samuelson, and Minnesota's 2027 second round draft pick in exchange for DiJonai Carrington.

=== All-Stars ===
- 1999: Sandy Brondello
- 2000: Wendy Palmer
- 2001: None
- 2002: None
- 2003: Swin Cash, Cheryl Ford, Deanna Nolan
- 2004: Cheryl Ford, Deanna Nolan
- 2005: Swin Cash, Cheryl Ford, Deanna Nolan, Ruth Riley
- 2006: Cheryl Ford, Deanna Nolan, Katie Smith
- 2007: Kara Braxton, Cheryl Ford, Deanna Nolan
- 2008: No All-Star Game
- 2009: Katie Smith
- 2010: None
- 2011: Liz Cambage
- 2012: No All-Star Game
- 2013: Glory Johnson
- 2014: Skylar Diggins, Glory Johnson
- 2015: Skylar Diggins, Plenette Pierson, Riquna Williams
- 2016: No All-Star Game
- 2017: Skylar Diggins-Smith
- 2018: Liz Cambage, Skylar Diggins-Smith
- 2019: None
- 2020: No All-Star Game
- 2021: Arike Ogunbowale, Satou Sabally
- 2022: Arike Ogunbowale
- 2023: Arike Ogunbowale, Satou Sabally
- 2024: Arike Ogunbowale
- 2025: Paige Bueckers

=== Olympians ===
- 2004: Swin Cash, Ruth Riley
- 2008: Katie Smith
- 2012: Liz Cambage (AUS)
- 2016: Erin Phillips (AUS)
- 2020: Allisha Gray
- 2024: Carla Leite (FRA), Satou Sabally (GER)

=== Honors and awards ===
- 1998 All-WNBA Second Team: Cindy Brown
- 2003 Finals MVP: Ruth Riley
- 2003 Rookie of the Year: Cheryl Ford
- 2003 Coach of the Year: Bill Laimbeer
- 2003 All-WNBA Second Team: Swin Cash
- 2003 All-WNBA Second Team: Cheryl Ford
- 2003 All-WNBA Second Team: Deanna Nolan
- 2004 All-WNBA Second Team: Swin Cash
- 2005 Peak Performer (Rebounds): Cheryl Ford
- 2005 All-WNBA First Team: Deanna Nolan
- 2005 All-Defensive Second Team: Deanna Nolan
- 2006 Finals MVP: Deanna Nolan
- 2006 Peak Performer (Rebounds): Cheryl Ford
- 2006 All-WNBA Second Team: Deanna Nolan
- 2006 All-Defensive Second Team: Cheryl Ford
- 2006 All-Defensive Second Team: Deanna Nolan
- 2007 All-Star Game MVP: Cheryl Ford
- 2007 Sixth Woman of the Year: Plenette Pierson
- 2007 All-WNBA First Team: Deanna Nolan
- 2007 All-Defensive First Team: Deanna Nolan
- 2008 Finals MVP: Katie Smith
- 2008 All-WNBA Second Team: Deanna Nolan
- 2008 All-Defensive Second Team: Deanna Nolan
- 2008 All-Defensive Second Team: Katie Smith
- 2009 All-WNBA Second Team: Deanna Nolan
- 2009 All-Defensive Second Team: Deanna Nolan
- 2009 All-Rookie Team: Shavonte Zellous
- 2011 All-Rookie Team: Liz Cambage
- 2012 All-Rookie Team: Glory Johnson
- 2012 All-Rookie Team: Riquna Williams
- 2013 Sixth Woman of the Year: Riquna Williams
- 2013 All-Rookie Team: Skylar Diggins
- 2013 All-Defensive Second Team: Glory Johnson
- 2014 Most Improved Player: Skylar Diggins
- 2014 Peak Performer (Rebounds): Courtney Paris
- 2014 All-WNBA First Team: Skylar Diggins
- 2014 All-Rookie Team: Odyssey Sims
- 2015 Peak Performer (Rebounds): Courtney Paris
- 2016 All-Rookie Team: Aerial Powers
- 2017 Rookie of the Year: Allisha Gray
- 2017 All-WNBA First Team: Skylar Diggins
- 2017 All-Rookie Team: Allisha Gray
- 2017 All-Rookie Team: Kayla Davis
- 2018 Peak Performer (Points): Liz Cambage
- 2018 All-WNBA First Team: Liz Cambage
- 2018 All-WNBA Second Team: Skylar Diggins
- 2018 All-Rookie Team: Azurá Stevens
- 2018 Dawn Staley Community Leadership Award: Skylar Diggins
- 2019 All-WNBA Second Team: Liz Cambage
- 2019 All-Rookie Team: Arike Ogunbowale
- 2020 Peak Performer (Points): Arike Ogunbowale
- 2020 All-WNBA First Team: Arike Ogunbowale
- 2020 All-Rookie Team: Satou Sabally
- 2021 All-Star Game MVP: Arike Ogunbowale
- 2021 All-WNBA Second Team: Arike Ogunbowale
- 2021 All-Rookie Team: Charli Collier
- 2023 Most Improved Player: Satou Sabally
- 2023 All-WNBA First Team: Satou Sabally
- 2024 All-Star Game MVP: Arike Ogunbowale
- 2024 All-WNBA Second Team: Arike Ogunbowale
- 2025 Rookie of the Year: Paige Bueckers
- 2025 All-Rookie Team: Paige Bueckers
- 2025 All-WNBA Second Team: Paige Bueckers

Sporting positions
Preceded by Los Angeles Sparks	WNBA Champions; 2003 (First title)	Succeeded by Seattle Storm
Preceded by New York Liberty	WNBA Eastern Conference Champions; 2003 (First title)	Succeeded by Connecticut Sun
Preceded by Sacramento Monarchs	WNBA Champions; 2006 (Second title)	Succeeded by Phoenix Mercury
Preceded by Phoenix Mercury	WNBA Champions; 2008 (Third title)	Succeeded by Phoenix Mercury
Preceded by Connecticut Sun	WNBA Eastern Conference Champions; 2006 (Second title); 2007 (Third title); 2008 (Fourth title)	Succeeded by Indiana Fever
