= List of WNBA career rebounding leaders =

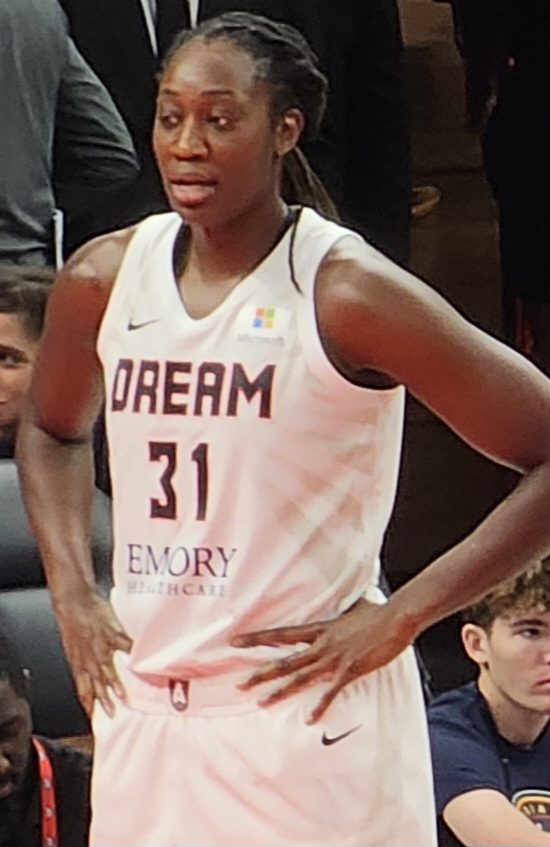
Tina Charles is the WNBA's all-time leader in total rebounds, with 4,262.

The following is a list of the players who have collected the most rebounds during their WNBA careers.

== Rebounding leaders ==
Statistics accurate as of the 2026 season.

^	Active WNBA player
*	Inducted into the Naismith Memorial Basketball Hall of Fame
^{†}	Not yet eligible for Hall of Fame consideration (Note: A player is not eligible for induction into the Naismith Memorial Basketball Hall of Fame until she has been fully retired for two calendar years.)
§	1st time eligible for Hall of Fame in 2025

WNBA most rebounds collected
Rank	Player	Pos	Team(s) played for (years)	Total rebounds	Games played	Rebounds per game average (Note: Average is rounded to the nearest tenth.)
1	Tina Charles^{†}	C	Connecticut Sun (2010–2013, 2025); New York Liberty (2014–2019); Washington Mystics (2021); Phoenix Mercury (2022); Seattle Storm (2022); Atlanta Dream (2024)	4,262	473	9.0
2	Sylvia Fowles*	C	Chicago Sky (2008–2014); Minnesota Lynx (2015–2022)	4,006	408	9.8
3	Nneka Ogwumike^	PF	Los Angeles Sparks (2012–2023, 2026–present); Seattle Storm (2024–2025)	3,657	480	7.6
4	Candace Parker*	PF/C	Los Angeles Sparks (2008–2020); Chicago Sky (2021–2022); Las Vegas Aces (2023)	3,467	410	8.5
5	DeWanna Bonner^	SG/SF	Phoenix Mercury (2009–2019, 2025–2026); Connecticut Sun (2020–2024); Indiana Fever (2025); Atlanta Dream (2026–present)	3,456	577	6.0
6	Rebekkah Brunson	PF	Sacramento Monarchs (2004–2009); Minnesota Lynx (2010–2018)	3,356	453	7.4
7	Tamika Catchings*	SF	Indiana Fever (2002–2016)	3,315	457	7.3
8	Lisa Leslie*	C	Los Angeles Sparks (1997–2006, 2008–2009)	3,307	363	9.1
9	Candice Dupree	PF	Chicago Sky (2006–2009); Phoenix Mercury (2010–2016); Indiana Fever (2017–2020); Seattle Storm (2021); Atlanta Dream (2021)	3,149	494	6.4
10	Tina Thompson*	PF	Houston Comets (1997–2008); Los Angeles Sparks (2009–2011); Seattle Storm (2012–2013)	3,070	496	6.2
11	Alyssa Thomas^	PF	Connecticut Sun (2014–2024); Phoenix Mercury (2025–present)	3,067	401	7.6
12	Taj McWilliams-Franklin	PF/C	Orlando Miracle/Connecticut Sun (1999–2006); Los Angeles Sparks (2007); Washington Mystics (2008); Detroit Shock (2008–2009); New York Liberty (2010); Minnesota Lynx (2011–2012)	3,013	440	6.8
13	Jonquel Jones^	C	Connecticut Sun (2016–2022); New York Liberty (2023–present)	2,960	349	8.5
14	A'ja Wilson^{^}	C	Las Vegas Aces (2018–present)	2,878	308	9.3
15	Breanna Stewart^	PF	Seattle Storm (2016–2022); New York Liberty (2023–present)	2,823	334	8.5
16	Brittney Griner^	C	Phoenix Mercury (2013–2024); Atlanta Dream (2025); Connecticut Sun (2026–present)	2,630	372	7.1
17	Dearica Hamby^	F	San Antonio Stars/Las Vegas Aces (2015–2022); Los Angeles Sparks (2023–present)	2,603	407	6.4
18	Sancho Lyttle	C/PF	Houston Comets (2005–2008); Atlanta Dream (2009–2017); Phoenix Mercury (2018–2019)	2,601	392	6.6
19	DeLisha Milton-Jones	SF/PF	Los Angeles Sparks (1999–2004, 2008–2012); Washington Mystics (2005–2007); San Antonio Silver Stars (2013); New York Liberty (2013–2014); Atlanta Dream (2014–2015)	2,574	499	5.2
20	Swin Cash*	SF	Detroit Shock (2002–2007); Seattle Storm (2008–2011); Chicago Sky (2012–2013); Atlanta Dream (2014); New York Liberty (2014–2016)	2,521	479	5.3
21	Natasha Howard^	PF	Indiana Fever (2014–2015, 2025); Minnesota Lynx (2016–2017, 2026–present); Seattle Storm (2018–2020); New York Liberty (2021–2022); Dallas Wings (2023–2024)	2,510	423	5.9
22	Michelle Snow	C	Houston Comets (2002–2008); Atlanta Dream (2009); San Antonio Silver Stars (2010); Chicago Sky (2011); Washington Mystics (2012–2013); Los Angeles Sparks (2015)	2,482	402	6.2
23	Crystal Langhorne	PF	Washington Mystics (2008–2013); Seattle Storm (2014–2020)	2,454	406	6.0
24	Lauren Jackson*	C/PF	Seattle Storm (2001–2012)	2,444	317	7.7
25	Yolanda Griffith*	C	Sacramento Monarchs (1999–2007); Seattle Storm (2008); Indiana Fever (2009)	2,444	311	7.9

== Progressive list of rebounding leaders ==
This is a progressive list of rebounding leaders showing how the record increased through the years.

Statistics accurate as of the 2026 season.

^	Active WNBA player
*	Inducted into the Naismith Memorial Basketball Hall of Fame
^{†}	Not yet eligible for Hall of Fame consideration (Note: A player is not eligible for induction into the Naismith Memorial Basketball Hall of Fame until she has been fully retired for two calendar years.)
§	Eligible for Hall of Fame in 2025

Team abbreviationsTeam(s) listed is the one player was on when she established the record.
ATL	Atlanta Dream	LAS	Los Angeles Sparks	SEA	Seattle Storm
CHI	Chicago Sky	LVA	Las Vegas Aces	TUL	Tulsa Shock
CON	Connecticut Sun	MIN	Minnesota Lynx	UTA	Utah Starzz
DET	Detroit Shock	NYL	New York Liberty		
IND	Indiana Fever	SAC	Sacramento Monarchs		

Rebounding leader at the end of every season
Season	Year-by-year leader	Rebounds	Active player leader	Total rebounds	Career record	Total rebounds	Single-season record	Rebounds	Season
1997	Lisa Leslie*LAS	266	Lisa Leslie*LAS	266	Lisa Leslie*LAS	266	Lisa Leslie*LAS	266	1997
1998	Cindy BrownDET	301	Lisa Leslie*LAS	501	Lisa Leslie*LAS	501	Cindy BrownDET	301	1998
1999	Yolanda Griffith*SAC	329	Lisa Leslie*LAS	799	Lisa Leslie*LAS	799	Yolanda Griffith*SAC	329	1999
2000	Natalie WilliamsUTA	336	Lisa Leslie*LAS	1,105	Lisa Leslie*LAS	1,105	Natalie WilliamsUTA	336	2000
2001	Yolanda Griffith*SAC	357	Lisa Leslie*LAS	1,403	Lisa Leslie*LAS	1,403	Yolanda Griffith*SAC	357	2001
2002	Lisa Leslie*LAS	322	Lisa Leslie*LAS	1,725	Lisa Leslie*LAS	1,725	Yolanda Griffith*SAC	357	2002
2003	Cheryl FordDET	334	Lisa Leslie*LAS	1,956	Lisa Leslie*LAS	1,956	Yolanda Griffith*SAC	357	2003
2004	Lisa Leslie*LAS	336	Lisa Leslie*LAS	2,292	Lisa Leslie*LAS	2,292	Yolanda Griffith*SAC	357	2004
2005	Cheryl FordDET	322	Lisa Leslie*LAS	2,540	Lisa Leslie*LAS	2,540	Yolanda Griffith*SAC	357	2005
2006	Cheryl FordDET	363	Lisa Leslie*LAS	2,863	Lisa Leslie*LAS	2,863	Cheryl FordDET	363	2006
2007	Lauren Jackson*SEA	300	Yolanda Griffith*SAC	2,248	Lisa Leslie*LAS	2,863	Cheryl FordDET	363	2007
2008	Candace Parker*LAS	313	Lisa Leslie*LAS	3,156	Lisa Leslie*LAS	3,156	Cheryl FordDET	363	2008
2009	Erika de SouzaATL	309	Lisa Leslie*LAS	3,307	Lisa Leslie*LAS	3,307	Cheryl FordDET	363	2009
2010	Tina Charles^{†}CON	398	Taj McWilliams-Franklin; NYL 2010; MIN 2011–12	2,631	Lisa Leslie*LAS	3,307	Tina Charles^{†}CON	398	2010
2011	Tina Charles^{†}CON	374	Taj McWilliams-Franklin; NYL 2010; MIN 2011–12	2,836	Lisa Leslie*LAS	3,307	Tina Charles^{†}CON	398	2011
2012	Tina Charles^{†}CON	345	Taj McWilliams-Franklin; NYL 2010; MIN 2011–12	3,013	Lisa Leslie*LAS	3,307	Tina Charles^{†}CON	398	2012
2013	Sylvia Fowles*CHI	369	Tina Thompson*SEA	3,070	Lisa Leslie*LAS	3,307	Tina Charles^{†}CON	398	2013
2014	Courtney ParisTUL	347	Tamika Catchings*IND	2,939	Lisa Leslie*LAS	3,307	Tina Charles^{†}CON	398	2014
2015	Courtney ParisTUL	317	Tamika Catchings*IND	3,152	Lisa Leslie*LAS	3,307	Tina Charles^{†}CON	398	2015
2016	Tina Charles^{†}NYL	317	Tamika Catchings*IND	3,315	Tamika Catchings*IND	3,315	Tina Charles^{†}CON	398	2016
2016	Breanna Stewart^SEA	317	Tamika Catchings*IND	3,315	Tamika Catchings*IND	3,315	Tina Charles^{†}CON	398	2016
2017	Jonquel Jones^CON	403	Rebekkah BrunsonMIN	3,315	Tamika Catchings*IND	3,315	Jonquel Jones^CON	403	2017
2018	Sylvia Fowles*MIN	404	Rebekkah BrunsonMIN	3,356	Rebekkah BrunsonMIN	3,356	Sylvia Fowles*MIN	404	2018
2019	Jonquel Jones^CON	330	Sylvia Fowles*MIN	3,332	Rebekkah BrunsonMIN	3,356	Sylvia Fowles*MIN	404	2019
2020	Candace Parker*LAS	214	Sylvia Fowles*MIN	3,400	Sylvia Fowles*MIN	3,400	Sylvia Fowles*MIN	404	2020
2021	Sylvia Fowles*MIN	312	Sylvia Fowles*MIN	3,712	Sylvia Fowles*MIN	3,712	Sylvia Fowles*MIN	404	2021
2022	A'ja Wilson^LVA	339	Sylvia Fowles*MIN	4,007	Sylvia Fowles*MIN	4,007	Sylvia Fowles*MIN	404	2022
2023	Alyssa Thomas^CON	394	Candace Parker*LVA	3,467	Sylvia Fowles*MIN	4,007	Sylvia Fowles*MIN	404	2023
2024	A'ja Wilson^LVA	451	Tina Charles^{†}ATL	4,014	Tina Charles^{†}ATL	4,014	A'ja Wilson^LVA	451	2024
2025	A'ja Wilson^LVA	407	Tina Charles^{†}ATL	4,262	Tina Charles^{†}ATL	4,262	A'ja Wilson^LVA	451	2025
2026	Angel Reese^ATL	521	Nneka Ogwumike^LAS	3,657	Tina Charles^{†}ATL	4,262	Angel Reese^ATL	521	2026
Season	Year-by-year leader	Rebounds	Active player leader	Total rebounds	Career record	Total rebounds	Single-season record	Rebounds	Season
