= Ayana Walker =

American basketball player (born 1979)

Personal information
- Born: September 10, 1979 (age 47) Houston, Texas, U.S.
- Listed height: 6 ft 3 in (1.91 m)
- Listed weight: 143 lb (65 kg)

Career information
- High school: Westbury (Houston, Texas)
- College: Louisiana Tech (1998–2002)
- WNBA draft: 2002: 2nd round, 20th overall pick
- Drafted by: Detroit Shock
- Playing career: 2002–2007
- Position: Forward
- Number: 12

Career history
- 2002–2005: Detroit Shock
- 2005–2006: Charlotte Sting
- 2007: Detroit Shock

Career highlights
- WNBA champion (2003); WBCA All-Star Team (2002); AP honorable mention All-American (2002); USA Basketball Female Athlete of the Year (2001); First-team All-WAC (2002); WAC All-Defensive Team (2002); WAC tournament MVP (2002); Sun Belt Defensive Player of the Year (2001); First-team All-Sun Belt (2001); Sun Belt Tournament MVP (2001)
- Stats at WNBA.com
- Stats at Basketball Reference
Medals
Women's basketball
Representing United States
World University Games
Silver medal – second place	1999 Palma de Mallorca	Team competition
Gold medal – first place	2001 Beijing	Team competition

Ayana D'Nay Walker (born September 10, 1979) is an American former women's basketball player. She played for the Louisiana Tech Lady Techsters basketball team from 1998 to 2002. Walker was a member of gold medal-winning USA Basketball Women's National Team in 2001 and set a USA single-game record with 19 rebounds in gold-medal game. She was also a member of gold medal-winning USA Basketball World University Games Team in 2001. Walker was drafted as the 20th overall pick by the Detroit Shock in the 2002 WNBA draft. As a member of the Shock, she won the 2003 WNBA Championship. On July 3, 2005, Walker signed with the Charlotte Sting. After the Sting franchise folded, Walker was drafted by Los Angeles Sparks as the 12th pick in the dispersal draft on January 8, 2007. She returned to Detroit for her final season in 2007.

== International career ==
Walker played on the team presenting the US at the 1999 World University Games held in Palma de Mallorca, Spain. The team had a 4–2 record and earned the silver medal. Walker averaged 4.3 points per game and led the team in blocks, with nine.

Walker was selected to be a member of the team representing the US at the 2001 World University Games held in Beijing, China. After winning the opening game easily, the USA team faced Canada and lost a close game 68–67. The USA team defeated Japan to earn a spot in the quarterfinals. The USA team fell behind by 12 points against undefeated Russia, but came back to win the game by eleven points. The next game was against the unbeaten host team China, and the USA team won 89–78. The USA team won their next two games to set up the gold medal game; a rematch against the host team. China would stay close early, but the USA team prevailed and won the gold medal with a score of 87–67. Walker set a USA World University Games record for most rebounds in a game with 19. She was the leading scorer and rebounding for the team, averaging 15.4 points and 8.6 rebounds per game.

== Career statistics ==
Legend
GP	Games played	GS	Games started	MPG	Minutes per game	RPG	Rebounds per game
APG	Assists per game	SPG	Steals per game	BPG	Blocks per game	PPG	Points per game
TO	Turnovers per game	FG%	Field-goal percentage	3P%	3-point field-goal percentage	FT%	Free-throw percentage
**Bold**	Career best	°	League leader

†	Denotes season(s) in which Walker won a WNBA championship

=== WNBA ===
==== Regular season ====
WNBA regular season statistics
Year	Team	GP	GS	MPG	FG%	3P%	FT%	RPG	APG	SPG	BPG	TO	PPG
2002	Detroit	32	0	17.1	37.7	**22.2**	69.4	3.7	0.5	0.4	**1.1**	0.9	**5.1**
2003^{†}	Detroit	**34**	1	8.0	34.3	—	38.1	2.1	0.3	0.3	0.3	0.6	1.6
2004	Detroit	18	1	8.2	28.6	—	33.3	1.4	0.3	0.1	0.2	0.3	1.0
2005	Detroit	12	**11**	20.1	**48.1**	—	**75.0**	**3.9**	**1.1**	**0.5**	0.8	1.3	4.9
2005	Charlotte	9	0	10.2	25.0	—	50.0	2.0	0.7	0.2	0.2	0.3	1.3
2006	Charlotte	25	0	7.3	45.9	—	57.1	1.2	0.1	0.4	0.4	**0.2**	1.8
2007	Detroit	2	1	**21.5**	42.9	—	33.3	3.0	0.5	**0.5**	1.0	3.0	3.5
**Career**	6 years, 2 teams	132	14	11.6	38.2	22.2	58.3	2.4	0.4	0.3	0.6	0.6	2.7

==== Playoffs ====
WNBA playoff statistics
Year	Team	GP	GS	MPG	FG%	3P%	FT%	RPG	APG	SPG	BPG	TO	PPG
2003^{†}	Detroit	4	0	**6.0**	20.0	—	**100.0**	**1.5**	0.0	**1.0**	**0.3**	0.3	**1.3**
2004	Detroit	2	0	2.0	—	—	—	0.0	**0.5**	0.0	0.0	0.5	0.0
2007	Detroit	**5**	0	1.8	**66.7**	—	66.7	1.0	0.2	0.0	0.0	**0.0**	1.2
**Career**	3 years, 1 team	11	0	3.4	37.5	—	83.3	1.0	0.2	0.4	0.1	0.2	1.0

=== College ===
NCAA statistics
Year	Team	GP	Points	FG%	3P%	FT%	RPG	APG	SPG	BPG	PPG
1999–00	Louisiana Tech	33	332	**52.9%**	0.0%	**72.0%**	7.1	0.8	1.2	1.7	10.1
2000–01	Louisiana Tech	**36**	**577**	47.5%	**25.0%**	69.6%	8.5	**1.7**	**1.4**	**2.4**	**16.0**
2001–02	Louisiana Tech	29	391	44.5%	0.0%	68.4%	**9.2**	1.6	1.1	1.7	13.5
**Career**		98	1300	47.8%	16.7%	69.8%	8.2	1.4	1.2	2.0	13.3
