= Korie Hlede =

Croatian sports administrator (born 1975)

Personal information
- Born: 29 March 1975 (age 51) Zagreb, SR Croatia, Yugoslavia
- Listed height: 1.75 m (5 ft 9 in)
- Listed weight: 68 kg (150 lb)

Career information
- College: Duquesne (1994–1998)
- WNBA draft: 1998: 1st round, 4th overall pick
- Drafted by: Detroit Shock
- Playing career: 1993–2008
- Position: Shooting guard

Career history
- 1993–1994: Montmontaža Zagreb
- 1998–1999: Detroit Shock
- 1999–2001: Utah Starzz
- 2000–2001: Slamanca
- 2001–2002: Guarulhos
- 2002: New York Liberty
- 2002–2003: Eregli
- 2003: Rivas Ecópolis
- 2004: Perfumerias
- 2004–2005: Pecs 2010
- 2006–2007: Hondarribia-Irun
- 2007–2008: Extremadura

Career highlights
- USBWA National Freshman of the Year (1995)
- Stats at Basketball Reference
Medals
Women's basketball
Representing Croatia
Mediterranean Games
Gold medal – first place	2001 Tunis	Team

Korie Hlede (born Koraljka Hlede on 29 March 1975) is a Croatian sports administrator. She is a co-founder and leader of basketball development at Flow Basketball Academy (FBA) in Chicago, Illinois. She played and coached professionally before starting her own training program KH Flow. In 2012, she teamed up with Margaret Stender (CEO of the Chicago Sky) to create Flow Basketball Academy.

== College years ==
Hlede was a communications and psychology double major at Duquesne University, where she led the Atlantic 10 conference (A10) in scoring during all of her four years (1994–1998). In 1995, she was named A10 rookie of the year, and by her senior year, she had netted a total of 2,631 points, becoming the only Duquesne player (male or female) to score over 2,000 career points. Hlede holds a number of other school records: steals (334), assists (570), three-pointers made (162), three-point percentage (.356), as well as most points scored in a single game (42 points against University of Dayton on 11 February 1998). Some of her collegiate awards are: ESPN Academic All-American (1996, 1997, 1998), A10 Player of the year (1996, 1998), A10 first team All-Conference pick (1995–1998), Kodak District 2 All-American (1995–1998), and Kodak National honorable mention All-American (1995–1998). In 2003, she was inducted into the Duquesne University Sports Hall of Fame and was the first female athlete in university history to have her jersey (#25) retired.

== Professional ==
=== International ===
From 2002 to 2008, Hlede competed in the European League, spending time in the First Divisions in Spain, Turkey, Hungary, Croatia, and Brazil. She also competed in three FIBA Cup championships, while reaching the final four of the Euro-league. Hlede led the Spanish and Turkish leagues in scoring during that span.

=== WNBA ===
In the 1998 WNBA draft Korie was selected by the Detroit Shock (now Tulsa Shock), in the first round (fourth pick overall). In her rookie year, she led her team in three-point field goal percentage and was named WNBA rookie of the year runner-up. In 1999 Korie was traded to the Utah Starzz, where she led the WNBA in three-point field goal percentage in 1999 and 2001. Over her five-year WNBA career, she has accumulated more than 1,000 points, 400 rebounds, 250 assists and 100 steals.

Year	Team
1998–1999	Detroit Shock
1999–2001	Utah Starzz
2002	New York Liberty

== Coaching and training ==
In 2003 Korie retired from the WNBA and joined the coaching staff of the Detroit Shock (head coach: Bill Laimbeer), where she helped them clinch the Shock's first national championship. After two years of coaching in the WNBA, she spent one year as assistant coach at the University of Rhode Island. In 2010, she created her own basketball development program, KH Flow Training, which was based on her interests in sports psychology and the work of philosopher and psychologist Mihaly Csikszentmihalyi. In 2012, she teamed up with Margaret Stender to create Flow Basketball Academy.

== Career statistics ==
=== WNBA career statistics ===
Legend
GP	Games played	GS	Games started	MPG	Minutes per game	RPG	Rebounds per game
APG	Assists per game	SPG	Steals per game	BPG	Blocks per game	PPG	Points per game
TO	Turnovers per game	FG%	Field-goal percentage	3P%	3-point field-goal percentage	FT%	Free-throw percentage
**Bold**	Career best	°	League leader

==== Regular season ====
Year	Team	GP	GS	MPG	FG%	3P%	FT%	RPG	APG	SPG	BPG	TO	PPG
1998	Detroit	27	27	**33.8**	39.1	39.2	80.6	**5.2**	2.7	0.8	0.0	3.3	**14.1**
1999	Detroit	21	10	19.4	39.0	33.3	85.7	2.6	1.2	1.0	0.1	1.5	8.8
1999	Utah	11	1	25.2	**46.3**	**44.8**	**90.9**	2.7	2.5	0.7	0.1	2.0	11.9
2000	Utah	**31**	**31**	28.0	45.4	43.1	72.9	**3.0**	**3.0**	**1.2**	0.1	2.5	10.1
2001	Utah	27	10	16.9	39.0	34.8	86.8	1.5	1.6	0.9	0.0	1.6	5.6
2002	New York	16	0	8.1	42.3	0.0	44.4	1.0	0.8	0.4	0.1	**1.3**	1.6
**Career**	5 years, 3 teams	133	79	22.9	41.4	39.7	80.5	2.8	2.1	0.9	0.1	2.1	8.9

==== Playoffs ====
Year	Team	GP	GS	MPG	FG%	3P%	FT%	RPG	APG	SPG	BPG	TO	PPG
2001	Utah	2	0	**8.5**	**40.0**	0.0	0.0	1.5	0.5	0.5	0.0	1.5	**2.0**
2002	New York	2	0	6.0	0.0	0.0	**75.0**	1.5	0.5	0.5	0.0	**1.0**	1.5
**Career**	2 years, 2 teams	4	0	7.3	33.3	0.0	75.0	1.5	0.5	0.5	0.0	1.3	1.8

=== College ===
Year	Team	GP	GS	MPG	FG%	3P%	FT%	RPG	APG	SPG	BPG	TO	PPG
1994–95	Duquesne	26			47.7	35.4	74.8	**8.0**	5.8	**4.2**	**0.3**		24.2°
1995–96	Duquesne	27			48.8	37.8	**82.6**	6.7	4.5	2.7	**0.3**		22.6°
1996–97	Duquesne	**28**			47.3	27.3	81.0	7.0	4.7	2.5	0.2		22.6°
1997–98	Duquesne	**28**			**49.2**	**41.8**	77.9	6.5	**6.0**	2.9	0.2		**27.1**°
**Career**		109			48.2	35.6	79.1	7.0	5.2	3.1	0.2		24.1
