= Cindy Brown (basketball) =

American basketball player (born 1965)

Personal information
- Born: March 16, 1965 (age 61) Portland, Oregon, U.S.
- Listed height: 6 ft 2 in (1.88 m)
- Listed weight: 184 lb (83 kg)

Career information
- High school: Grant (Portland, Oregon)
- College: Long Beach State (1983–1987)
- Playing career: 1998–1999
- Position: Forward / center
- Number: 14

Career history
- 1998–1999: Detroit Shock
- 1999: Utah Starzz

Career highlights
- Big West player of the year (1986); All-WNBA Second Team (1998); 2× Kodak All-American (1986, 1987)
- Stats at Basketball Reference
Medals
Women's Basketball
Representing United States
Olympic Games
Gold medal – first place	1988 Seoul	Team competition
Pan American Games
Gold medal – first place	1987 Indianapolis	Team
World University Games
Gold medal – first place	1985 Kobe	Team competition
FIBA World Championship for Women
Gold medal – first place	1986 Moscow	Team competition

Cynthia Louise "Cindy" Brown (born March 16, 1965) is an American former women's basketball player, at the college, Olympic and professional levels. Brown was a member of the USA Basketball team which went on to win a gold medal at the Pan American Games in Indianapolis, Indiana in 1987, and the gold medal at the 1988 Olympics in Seoul. She was also a member of the gold medal-winning team for the US at the 1985 World University Games, and the 1986 World Championship team.

== College career ==
Born in Portland, Oregon, Brown played basketball for Long Beach State University between 1983 and 1987. As a senior, she set two NCAA scoring records—the most points in a single season (974) and the most points in a single game (60). The 60 point game was against San Jose State, a game Long Beach would win 149–69. Brown was a member of the Final Four All-Tournament team in 1987, and earned first team All-America honors in 1986 and 1987.

== Career statistics ==
Legend
GP	Games played	GS	Games started	MPG	Minutes per game	RPG	Rebounds per game
APG	Assists per game	SPG	Steals per game	BPG	Blocks per game	PPG	Points per game
TO	Turnovers per game	FG%	Field-goal percentage	3P%	3-point field-goal percentage	FT%	Free-throw percentage
**Bold**	Career best	°	League leader

=== WNBA ===
==== Regular season ====
Year	Team	GP	GS	MPG	FG%	3P%	FT%	RPG	APG	SPG	BPG	TO	PPG
1998	Detroit	**30**	**30**	**32.2**	**47.0**	**32.8**	**70.7**	**10.0**	**1.8**	**1.7**	**0.7**	2.2	**11.8**
1999	Detroit	21	21	23.3	31.5	23.3	69.2	5.4	1.0	1.2	0.6	1.7	6.9
1999	Utah	9	0	17.3	34.4	10.0	68.8	3.7	1.1	1.0	0.2	**1.3**	3.8
Career	2 years, 2 teams	60	51	26.9	41.0	27.7	70.1	7.5	1.4	1.4	0.6	1.9	8.9

=== College ===
Legend
GP	Games played	GS	Games started	MPG	Minutes per game
FG%	Field goal percentage	3P%	3-point field goal percentage	FT%	Free throw percentage
RPG	Rebounds per game	APG	Assists per game	SPG	Steals per game
BPG	Blocks per game	PPG	Points per game	**Bold**	Career high

Year	Team	GP	Points	FG%	FT%	RPG	APG	PPG
1983–84	Long Beach State	30	318	.554	.633	6.6	NA	10.6
1984–85	Long Beach State	30	599	.589	.681	10.0	**2.9**	20.0
1985–86	Long Beach State	33	805	**.596**	.695	**10.2**	2.5	24.4
1986–87	Long Beach State	**35**	**974**	.579	**.789**	9.9	2.6	**27.8**
Career		128	2,696	.583	.721	9.3	2.0	21.1

== Professional career ==
Because the U.S. lacked a women's pro league, Brown played professionally in Europe and Japan for almost a decade. She played for:

- Sidis Ancona (Italy) 1987–1988
- Toshiba Yana Gi Cho (Japan) 1988–1992
- Faenza Errieti Club (Italy) 1992–1994
- Elizur Holon (Israel) 1994–1996
- US Valenciennes-Orchies (France) 1997–1998

She was selected by the Seattle Reign in the second round of the ABL Draft on June 19, 1996. A 6'-1" center/power forward, a tenacious rebounder and a strong inside scoring presence, Brown earned Second Team All-ABL honors following the 1996–97 season. She was assigned to the site of her college success, the expansion Long Beach Stingrays on April 26, 1997. Before she ever reported to Long Beach, however, Brown signed with the rival WNBA.

=== WNBA ===
Brown was part of the initial player allocation prior to the 1998 season and was sent to the Detroit Shock. Brown's debut game was played on June 13, 1998 in a 69–78 loss to the Charlotte Sting where she recorded 10 points and 8 rebounds.

In her first season with the Shock, she was the starting Forward for all 30 games of the season, finished second in the WNBA in rebounding and was named to the 1998 All-WNBA Second Team. On August 10, 1998, Brown broke the Shock franchise record for most rebounds in a game when she grabbed 21 rebounds in a 77–73 win over the Utah Starzz. Future Detroit Shock star Cheryl Ford would tie Brown's rebound record on June 22, 2003 against the Connecticut Sun, but then Ford broke the record on May 22, 2004 when she snagged 22 boards against the San Antonio Silver Stars. The Shock finished the 1998 season with a 17–13 record but missed the playoffs.

On July 29, 1999, midway through her second WNBA season, Brown was traded, along with teammate Korie Hlede, to the Utah Starzz for Wendy Palmer and Olympia Scott-Richardson. It was alleged that both Hlede and Brown requested to be traded from Detroit. Hlede wanted more playing time as her minutes per game dropped from 33.8 in her rookie season with the Shock, to 19.4 in her sophomore season. While Brown was alleged to have not gotten along well with coach and general manager Nancy Lieberman.

Brown played in 9 of Utah's remaining 11 season games (missing the final 2 games of the season). She started in all 9 of those games and averaged 3.8 points and 3.7 rebounds. The Starzz closed out the season winning 8 of their last 11 games. Unfortunately, the team had a 7–14 record by the time Brown arrived and the team consequently missed the playoffs after finishing 15–17.

After finishing the 1999 season with the Starzz, Brown would announce her retirement from the WNBA. Her final game in the league was played on August 16, 1999 in a 71–80 loss to the Houston Comets. In her final game, Brown recorded 2 rebounds, 1 assist but no points.

== See also ==
- List of NCAA Division I women's basketball players with 2,500 points and 1,000 rebounds
