= Rhonda Blades =

American basketball player (born 1972)

Rhonda Blades Brown
Personal information
- Born: October 29, 1972 (age 54) Springfield, Missouri
- Listed height: 5 ft 7 in (1.70 m)
- Listed weight: 137 lb (62 kg)

Career information
- High school: Parkview (Springfield, Missouri)
- College: Vanderbilt (1991–1995)
- WNBA draft: 1998: Expansion round, 1st overall pick
- Drafted by: Detroit Shock
- Playing career: 1997–1998
- Position: Guard
- Number: 10

Career history
- 1997: New York Liberty
- 1998: Detroit Shock

Career WNBA statistics
- Points: 146 (2.6 ppg)
- Assists: 71 (1.2 apg)
- Steals: 26 (0.5 spg)
- Stats at Basketball Reference

Rhonda Blades Brown (born October 29, 1972) is a former professional basketball player. She was the first pick in the 1998 WNBA expansion draft and was selected by the New York Liberty. Blades was a 4-year starting point guard and captain at Vanderbilt University and played 6 years professionally including the WNBA and abroad.

Brown has the distinction of being the very first player in the WNBA to make a 3-Point Shot.

== College ==
Rhonda Blades played basketball for Vanderbilt. During her four seasons (1992–95), she totaled 1,017 points and was named Honorable Mention All-American during her senior year. Blades completed a master's degree in nursing (MSN) and RN from VUSN in 1996.

=== Vanderbilt statistics ===
Ratios
Year	Team	GP	FG%	3P%	FT%	RBG	APG	BPG	SPG	PPG
1991-92	Vanderbilt	31	48.0%	35.3%	81.6%	1.55	1.48	0.06	0.94	3.03
1992-93	Vanderbilt	33	42.3%	32.3%	76.6%	3.12	4.73	0.03	1.94	7.52
1993-94	Vanderbilt	33	44.7%	40.1%	80.4%	3.97	4.73	0.06	1.88	11.73
1994-95	Vanderbilt	35	40.0%	35.1%	61.7%	3.60	4.20	0.00	1.80	8.23
Career		132	42.9%	36.3%	75.9%	3.09	3.83	0.04	1.65	7.70

Totals
Year	Team	GP	FG	FGA	3P	3PA	FT	FTA	REB	A	BK	ST	PTS
1991-92	Vanderbilt	31	24	50	6	17	40	49	48	46	2	29	94
1992-93	Vanderbilt	33	66	156	31	96	85	111	103	156	1	64	248
1993-94	Vanderbilt	33	115	257	67	167	90	112	131	156	2	62	387
1994-95	Vanderbilt	35	92	230	67	191	37	60	126	147	0	63	288
Career		132	297	693	171	471	252	332	408	505	5	218	1017

== WNBA ==
Brown entered the WNBA in 1997 during its inaugural season and was a member of the New York Liberty. Her debut game was played on June 21, 1997, in a 67 - 57 victory over the Los Angeles Sparks. In that game, Brown became the very first player in the WNBA to score a 3-point shot. Coincidentally, that 3-pointer was Brown's only field goal attempt of the game and she finished the game with 3 points, 1 assist and 1 steal. She played a reserve role for the Liberty and helped the team finish with a record of 17 - 11 while averaging 2.9 points and 1.1 assists in 10.4 minutes per game. The Liberty reached the inaugural WNBA Finals on August 30, 1997, but lost to the Houston Comets 51 - 65 with Brown playing for 13 minutes and recording 2 assists, 2 turnovers and 1 foul.

On February 18, 1998, Rhonda Blades Brown was selected with the first overall pick of the 1998 expansion draft by the Detroit Shock. During her time with the Shock, all of her averages remained around the same as during her time with the Liberty (2.3 points, 1.4 assists in 11.7 minutes per game). She started the first 2 games of the Shock's season then lost her starting spot to teammate Sandy Brondello for the remainder of the season. The Shock had a rough start to the 1998 season, losing their first 4 games, then winning 6 in a row, and then losing another 4 games to start off 6 - 8. The team resiliently finished the season with a 17 - 13 record but missed the playoffs.

Brown was waived by the Shock on April 23, 1999, before the start of the 1999 WNBA season. She signed a contract with the Washington Mystics on May 8, but was waived a month later on June 9 (one day before the Mystics played their first game of the season). After being waived by the Mystics, Brown missed the entire 1999 and 2000 seasons.

Brown played overseas professionally in Israel and Turkey, winning the Israeli cup in 2000–2001.

After missing two entire seasons, Brown signed with the Cleveland Rockers on April 30, 2001. However, she was waived on May 11. Brown missed the 2001 season and moved on from the WNBA. Her final WNBA appearance was on August 19, 1998, the last regular season game of the Detroit Shock. The Shock toppled the Liberty 82 - 68; Brown recorded 1 missed field goal and no other stats in four minutes of playing time.

== WNBA per game stats ==
Legend
GP	Games played	GS	Games started	MPG	Minutes per game	RPG	Rebounds per game
APG	Assists per game	SPG	Steals per game	BPG	Blocks per game	PPG	Points per game
TO	Turnovers per game	FG%	Field-goal percentage	3P%	3-point field-goal percentage	FT%	Free-throw percentage
**Bold**	Career best	°	League leader

=== Regular season ===
Year	Team	GP	GS	MPG	FG%	3P%	FT%	RPG	APG	SPG	BPG	TO	PPG
1997	New York	28	0	10.4	**.357**	**.315**	**.650**	0.8	1.1	**0.5**	0.0	**1.4**	**2.9**
1998	Detroit	**29**	**2**	**11.7**	.256	.240	.483	**1.1**	**1.4**	0.4	0.0	**1.4**	2.3
Career	2 years, 2 teams	57	2	11.1	.304	.279	.551	0.9	1.2	0.5	0.0	1.4	2.6

=== Playoffs ===
Year	Team	GP	GS	MPG	FG%	3P%	FT%	RPG	APG	SPG	BPG	TO	PPG
1997	New York	1	0	13.0	—	—	—	0.0	2.0	0.0	0.0	2.0	0.0

== Life after Professional Basketball ==
After basketball, Brown became the head varsity girls' basketball coach at Brentwood Academy, in Brentwood, Tennessee. She has coached a winning program for 17 seasons (361–162 record), including 5 state championships and 4 additional state championship appearances. She teaches Anatomy and Health at Brentwood Academy; her popularity led to additional sessions being added to meet demand. Brown is married to Parke Brown (22 years), and is the mother of two children, Blades and Millie.
