= Margaret Stender =

American sports businesswoman

Margaret Stender is a businesswoman and former college basketball player. She spent 21 years in the corporate business world, including being president of the ready-to-eat cereal division at Quaker Oats Company; senior vice-president and general manager of consumer travel solutions for Rand McNally & Co; vice-president of marketing for Ameritech New Media; and president of PepsiCo's juice drink division.

In 2005, she was officially announced as the first team president of the Women's National Basketball Association team the Chicago Sky. Stender once served as a high school basketball coach and played the game in college, at the University of Richmond.
