= Tajama Abraham Ngongba =

American basketball player and coach (born 1975)

Tajama Abraham
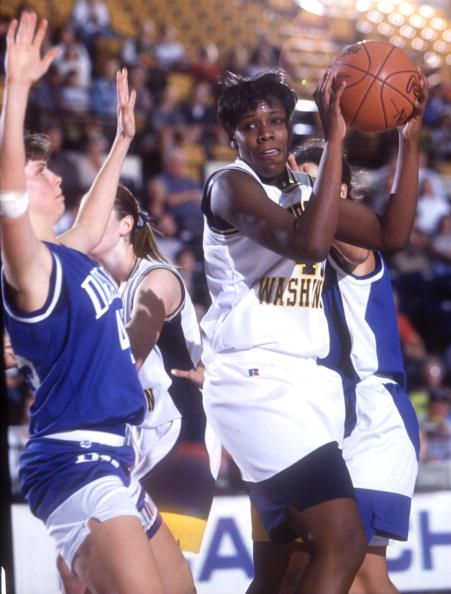
- Abraham in 1995

Personal information
- Born: September 27, 1975 (age 51) Saint Croix, U.S. Virgin Islands
- Listed height: 6 ft 2 in (1.88 m)
- Listed weight: 190 lb (86 kg)

Career information
- High school: Kecoughtan (Hampton, Virginia)
- College: George Washington (1993–1997)
- WNBA draft: 1997: 4th round, 31st overall pick
- Drafted by: Sacramento Monarchs
- Position: Center
- Number: 40
- Coaching career: 2000–2023

Career history

Playing
- 1997: Sacramento Monarchs
- 1998: Detroit Shock

Coaching
- 2000–2002: Richmond (assistant)
- 2002–2004: VCU (assistant)
- 2004–2008: George Washington (assistant)
- 2008–2013: Radford
- 2013–2021: George Mason (assistant)
- 2021-2023: George Washington (assistant)

Career highlights
- Kodak All-American (1997)
- Stats at Basketball Reference

Tajama Abraham Ngongba (born September 27, 1975) is a former professional basketball player in the Women's National Basketball Association. Abraham attended George Washington University and was the 31st draft pick in the 1997 WNBA draft. She played for Sacramento Monarchs in 1997 and Detroit Shock in 1998. Abraham began coaching in 2000 as an Assistant Coach at Richmond, before serving as an assistant at VCU, George Washington and George Mason University. Ngongba was the head coach of Radford from 2008 to 2013.

== Early life ==
Abraham was born September 27, 1975, on the island of St. Croix, in the United States Virgin Islands. She lived there until the age of 14 when the category 4 Hurricane Hugo hit the island on September 17 and 18, 1989. She took shelter in a commercial refrigerator, which measured 8' x 12', along with her four siblings, mother, father, and grandmother. After the destruction, the family moved to Hampton, Virginia. Not long after arriving in Virginia, local coaches and newspapers were talking about the high school basketball prospect who had arrived in town. Her father had played college ball at St. John's, and her two brothers were also basketball players who played at Marquette University and George Mason University.

Abraham attended Kecoughtan High School, in Hampton, Virginia. In her senior year, she averaged 27 points per game and 11 rebounds. She earned Parade All-American (third team) status in 1993.

== College career ==
Abraham was ranked among the top 25 players in the nation as a senior, and recruited by multiple schools, including Virginia and Old Dominion. She chose the offer from George Washington, explaining, "`I really felt at home at George Washington".

She joined the team coached by Joe McKeown who was in the fifth year of a 19-year stint at George Washington. The Colonials, under McKeown had a breakeven season in his first year, then finish second or tied for second in the Atlantic 10 conference in each of the next three years, advancing to the NCAA tournament twice. After Abraham joined the team, they finished first or tied for first in the Atlantic conference each of her four years, with an improving conference record each year culminating in a perfect 16–0 result in her senior year. The Colonials had an overall record of 28–6 in that year and reached the NCAA Elite eight. Abraham scored 2134 points in her career to graduate as the all-time leading scorer. She pulled down 970 rebounds to finish second all-time. She has the most career block shots (326) and leads in the number of games played (130). Her career accomplishments led to her induction in the George Washington Athletic Hall of Fame in 2004. In her senior season she was named the Atlantic 10 conference player of the year as well as a first-team Kodak All-American.

== Professional career ==
After graduating from George Washington with a degree in sociology, she was selected with the 31st overall pick in the 1997 WNBA draft by the Sacramento Monarchs. Her debut game was played on June 21, 1997, in a 73–61 victory over the Utah Starzz where she recorded 4 points and 8 rebounds on 14% FG shooting (1-7 FG). Abraham only played for Sacramento her rookie season, playing in 28 games (starting in 5 of them) and averaging 4.4 points and 2.8 rebounds per game on 38% FG shooting (48 - 126 FG).

In 1998, the WNBA held an expansion draft to allocate players to the newly created teams. Abraham was the third pick of the expansion draft, chosen by the Detroit Shock. She only played in 12 of the Shock's 30 games in the 1998 season, averaging only 3.7 minutes per game (whereas she averaged 15.1 mpg in her rookie season) along with 1.5 points and 0.6 rebounds. The Shock finished with a 17–13 record (8–4 record with the games that Abraham played in).

After completely missing the 1999 season, Abraham would sign a contract with the Seattle Storm for the 2000 season. However, she would not play a single game for the team and after the Storm started with a 0–4 record, Abraham would be waived on June 8, 2000.

Abraham would not play in the WNBA again once she was waived by Seattle and missed the entire 2000 season. And thus, her final game ever was played when she was a member of the Shock on August 19, 1998. On that day, the Shock defeated the New York Liberty 82–68 with Abraham only playing for less than one minute and recording no stats.

== Coaching career ==
Following her professional career, Abraham returned to her alma mater and spent a year at George Washington University as an administrative assistant. Following that she accepted a position as an assistant coach at Richmond where she stayed for the 2000–2001 and 2001–02 seasons. Abraham then moved on to Virginia Commonwealth, taking a position as an assistant coach which included responsibilities for conditioning, scouting, post play development, and recruiting. She held this position for two seasons, starting in the fall of 2002.

She then returned to George Washington again, and served as an assistant coach for the next four years.

In 2004, Radford University named Abraham to head coaching position of the women's basketball team. She remained at Radford for five years. In her third year, the team 111 conference games the most in almost 2 decades, leading to a tie for second place in the Big South conference and earning Abraham Big South coach of the year honors. She was completely surprised by the honor and reflected, "I'm a high-energy person. It took every fiber of my being just to keep from jumping up and down."

Over the next two years, the team managed to go only .500 in conference play, and the school decided not to renew her contract now at the end of a five-year period. She decided to return to the assistant coaching ranks, accepting an offer from Nyla Milleson at George Mason, where she served as an assistant from 2003-2021.

Ngongba returned to Georgetown in 2021, coaching as an assistant for two seasons.

== Career statistics ==
=== College ===
Legend
GP	Games played	GS	Games started	MPG	Minutes per game
FG%	Field goal percentage	3P%	3-point field goal percentage	FT%	Free throw percentage
RPG	Rebounds per game	APG	Assists per game	SPG	Steals per game
BPG	Blocks per game	PPG	Points per game	**Bold**	Career high

Year	Team	GP	Points	FG%	FT%	RPG	APG	SPG	BPG	PPG
1993–94	George Washington	31	414	54.1%	69.3%	9.0	**2.0**	**2.4**	2.2	13.4
1994–95	George Washington	32	442	51.4%	67.2%	6.0	0.6	0.9	2.3	13.8
1995–96	George Washington	33	642	**56.5%**	69.9%	**9.3**	0.7	1.2	**2.8**	19.5
1996–97	George Washington	**34**	**675**	50.3%	**75.3%**	7.7	1.0	1.6	2.7	**19.9**
Career		130	2173	53.0%	71.3%	8.0	1.0	1.5	2.5	16.7

=== WNBA ===
Legend
GP	Games played	GS	Games started	MPG	Minutes per game	RPG	Rebounds per game
APG	Assists per game	SPG	Steals per game	BPG	Blocks per game	PPG	Points per game
TO	Turnovers per game	FG%	Field-goal percentage	3P%	3-point field-goal percentage	FT%	Free-throw percentage
**Bold**	Career best	°	League leader

==== Regular season ====
Year	Team	GP	GS	MPG	FG%	3P%	FT%	RPG	APG	SPG	BPG	TO	PPG
1997	Sacramento	**28**°	**5**	**15.1**	**.381**	–	**.684**	**2.4**	**.5**	**.4**	**.4**	1.8	**4.4**
1998	Detroit	12	0	3.7	.357	–	.533	.6	.0	.2	.1	**.4**	1.5
Career	2 years, 2 teams	40	5	11.7	.379	–	.642	1.9	.3	.4	.3	1.4	3.5

=== Head coaching record ===
Record table
Season	Team	Overall	Conference	Standing	Postseason
**Radford** (Big South) (2008–2012)
2008–09	Radford	10–18	9–7	T-3rd	
2009–10	Radford	6–22	5–11	7th	
2010–11	Radford	22–11	11–5	T-2nd	
2011–12	Radford	16–15	9–9	T-5th	
2012–13	Radford	16–14	9–9	6th	
Radford:		62–85 (.422)	43–41 (.512)		
Total:		62–85 (.422)			
National champion Postseason invitational champion Conference regular season champion Conference regular season and conference tournament champion Division regular season champion Division regular season and conference tournament champion Conference tournament champion

== Personal life ==
In 2003, Ngongba married George Washington men's basketball player Patrick Ngongba. The two have a daughter, Naja, and son, Patrick Ngongba II, who plays basketball for Duke University.
