= 1998 Detroit Shock season =

- Head coach: Nancy Lieberman-Cline
- Arena: The Palace of Auburn Hills

Results
- Record: 17–13 (.567)
- Place: 4th (Eastern)
- Playoff finish: Did not qualify

The 1998 WNBA season was the first for the Detroit Shock. The team had an 0–4 start, but by season's end they missed out on a postseason berth by just one game in the standings.

== Transactions ==
=== WNBA allocation draft ===
Player	Nationality	School/Team/Country
Cindy Brown	United States	Seattle Reign
Razija Mujanović	Yugoslavia	Microcamp Campinas (Brazil)

=== WNBA expansion draft ===
Player	Nationality	Former WNBA Team
Lynette Woodard	United States	Cleveland Rockers
Tara Williams	United States	Phoenix Mercury
Tajama Abraham	United States	Sacramento Monarchs
Rhonda Blades	United States	New York Liberty

=== WNBA draft ===
Round	Pick	Player	Nationality	School/Team/Country
1	4	Korie Hlede	Yugoslavia	Duquesne
2	14	Rachael Sporn	Australia	Adelaide Lightning (Australia)
3	24	Gergana Branzova	Bulgaria	FIU
4	34	Sandy Brondello	Australia	BTV Wuppertal (Germany)

=== Transactions ===
Date	Transaction
January 12, 1998	Hired Nancy Lieberman-Cline as Head Coach
January 27, 1998	Drafted Cindy Brown and Razija Brcaninovic in the 1998 WNBA Allocation Draft
February 18, 1998	Drafted Lynette Woodard, Tara Williams, Tajama Abraham and Rhonda Blades in the 1998 WNBA expansion draft
April 29, 1998	Drafted Korie Hlede, Rachael Sporn, Gergana Branzova and Sandy Brondello in the 1998 WNBA draft
May 2, 1998	Signed Aneta Kausaite and Mfon Udoka
June 22, 1998	Waived Mfon Udoka

== Roster ==
1998 Detroit Shock roster
Players
Coaches

Pos.	No.	Nat.	Name	Height	Weight	DOB	From	Yrs
C	40	(United States)	Abraham, Tajama	6' 2" (1.88m)	190 lb (86kg)	1975-09-27	George Washington	1
G	10	(United States)	Blades, Rhonda	5' 7" (1.7m)	138 lb (63kg)	1972-10-29	Vanderbilt	1
F	11	(Australia)	Boyd, Carla	6' 1" (1.85m)	172 lb (78kg)	1975-10-31		R
F	34	(People's Republic of Bulgaria)	Branzova, Gergana	6' 4" (1.93m)	178 lb (81kg)	1976-07-25	FIU	R
C	12	(Socialist Federal Republic of Yugoslavia)	Brcaninovich, Razija	6' 8" (2.03m)	198 lb (90kg)	1967-04-15		R
G	6	(Australia)	Brondello, Sandy	5' 7" (1.7m)	136 lb (62kg)	1968-08-20		R
F	14	(United States)	Brown, Cindy	6' 2" (1.88m)	183 lb (83kg)	1965-03-16	Long Beach State	R
G/F	24	(United States)	Hamblin, Angela	5' 10" (1.78m)	170 lb (77kg)	1976-09-30	Iowa	R
G	7	(Socialist Federal Republic of Yugoslavia)	Hlede, Korie	5' 9" (1.75m)	155 lb (70kg)	1975-03-29	Duquesne	R
F	20	(Soviet Union)	Kausaite, Aneta	6' 0" (1.83m)	155 lb (70kg)	1970-11-30	Emporia State	R
F	4	(Australia)	Sporn, Rachael	6' 1" (1.85m)	175 lb (79kg)	1968-03-26		R
F	30	(United States)	Udoka, Mfon	6' 0" (1.83m)	187 lb (85kg)	1976-06-16	DePaul	R
G	8	(United States)	Woodard, Lynette	6' 0" (1.83m)	160 lb (73kg)	1959-08-12	Kansas	1

Head coach
(United States) Nancy Lieberman-Cline (Old Dominion)

Legend

- (C) Team captain
- (DP) Unsigned draft pick
- (FA) Free agent
- (S) Suspended
- Injured

== Schedule ==
=== Regular season ===
1998 game log
Total: 17–13 (Home: 11–4; Road: 6–9)
June: 5–4 (Home: 3–2; Road: 2–2)

Game	Date	Team	Score	High points	High rebounds	High assists	Location Attendance	Record
1	June 13	Charlotte	L 69–78	Razija Brcaninovic (22)	Razija Brcaninovic (13)	Blades; Boyd (4)	The Palace of Auburn Hills	0–1
2	June 15	Cleveland	L 85–96	Korie Hlede (17)	Cindy Brown (10)	Sandy Brondello (5)	The Palace of Auburn Hills	0–2
3	June 18	@ Charlotte	L 67–71	Sandy Brondello (14)	Cindy Brown (7)	Rhonda Blades (4)	Charlotte Coliseum	0–3
4	June 20	@ Cleveland	L 57–65	Korie Hlede (19)	Rachael Sporn (8)	Sandy Brondello (5)	Gund Arena	0–4
5	June 21	@ Washington	W 70–57	Korie Hlede (20)	Brown; Hlede (6)	Sandy Brondello (9)	MCI Center	1–4
6	June 23	Sacramento	W 61–57	Korie Hlede (25)	Cindy Brown (12)	Korie Hlede (4)	The Palace of Auburn Hills	2–4
7	June 25	Washington	W 79–71	Sandy Brondello (19)	Cindy Brown (7)	Sandy Brondello (5)	The Palace of Auburn Hills	3–4
8	June 27	@ Cleveland	W 84–73	Brondello; Hlede (23)	Cindy Brown (10)	Brondello; Hlede (4)	Gund Arena	4–4
9	June 29	Charlotte	W 60–49	Brondello; Brown (19)	Cindy Brown (16)	Blades; Hlede (2)	The Palace of Auburn Hills	5–4

July: 7–6 (Home: 6–1; Road: 1–5)

Game	Date	Team	Score	High points	High rebounds	High assists	Location Attendance	Record
10	July 1	New York	W 82–65	Cindy Brown (22)	Brcaninovic; Brown (10)	Sandy Brondello (7)	The Palace of Auburn Hills	6–4
11	July 6	@ New York	L 56–59	Cindy Brown (12)	Cindy Brown (12)	Sandy Brondello (5)	Madison Square Garden	6–5
12	July 8	Phoenix	L 76–78	Carla Boyd (18)	Cindy Brown (9)	Sandy Brondello (8)	The Palace of Auburn Hills	6–6
13	July 9	@ Houston	L 66–96	Cindy Brown (14)	Cindy Brown (13)	Brondello; Hlede (5)	Compaq Center	6–7
14	July 11	@ Washington	L 53–78	Sandy Brondello (10)	Cindy Brown (10)	Hlede; Woodard (2)	MCI Center	6–8
15	July 13	@ Utah	W 74–67	Sandy Brondello (23)	Korie Hlede (11)	Sandy Brondello (3)	Delta Center	7–8
16	July 15	@ Phoenix	L 60–73	Korie Hlede (16)	Brown; Sporn (9)	Sandy Brondello (4)	America West Arena	7–9
17	July 17	Utah	W 79–67	Sandy Brondello (18)	Cindy Brown (15)	Sandy Brondello (7)	The Palace of Auburn Hills	8–9
18	July 18	Cleveland	W 72–57	Brown; Hlede (16)	Korie Hlede (13)	Sandy Brondello (3)	The Palace of Auburn Hills	9–9
19	July 22	Washington	W 76–61	Carla Boyd (19)	Cindy Brown (9)	Brondello; Brown; Hlede (3)	The Palace of Auburn Hills	10–9
20	July 25	Los Angeles	W 69–67	Korie Hlede (20)	Cindy Brown (14)	Korie Hlede (7)	The Palace of Auburn Hills	11–9
21	July 26	@ New York	L 62–78	Korie Hlede (14)	Korie Hlede (8)	Korie Hlede (6)	Madison Square Garden	11–10
22	July 31	Sacramento	W 78–77	Sandy Brondello (20)	Cindy Brown (10)	Carla Boyd (9)	The Palace of Auburn Hills	12–10

August: 5–3 (Home: 2–1; Road: 3–2)

Game	Date	Team	Score	High points	High rebounds	High assists	Location Attendance	Record
23	August 3	@ Charlotte	L 68–71	Sandy Brondello (21)	Cindy Brown (10)	Carla Boyd (4)	Charlotte Coliseum	12–11
24	August 5	Los Angeles	W 73–61	Korie Hlede (20)	Cindy Brown (10)	Brondello; Brown (4)	The Palace of Auburn Hills	13–11
25	August 7	Houston	L 57–61	Cindy Brown (13)	Cindy Brown (13)	Cindy Brown (5)	The Palace of Auburn Hills	13–12
26	August 10	@ Utah	W 77–73	Korie Hlede (20)	Cindy Brown (21)	Cindy Brown (4)	Delta Center	14–12
27	August 11	@ Sacramento	W 50–41	Sandy Brondello (15)	Cindy Brown (12)	Carla Boyd (4)	ARCO Arena	15–12
28	August 14	@ Phoenix	L 59–74	Sandy Brondello (20)	Carla Boyd (8)	Rhonda Blades (3)	America West Arena	15–13
29	August 16	@ Los Angeles	W 73–68	Razija Brcaninovic (25)	Cindy Brown (11)	Sandy Brondello (5)	Great Western Forum	16–13
30	August 19	New York	W 82–68	Sandy Brondello (24)	Lynette Woodard (9)	Lynette Woodard (3)	The Palace of Auburn Hills	17–13

1998 season schedule

=== Season standings ===
Eastern Conference	W	L	PCT	Conf.	GB
Cleveland Rockers ^{x}	20	10	.667	12–4	–
Charlotte Sting ^{x}	18	12	.600	11–5	2.0
New York Liberty ^{o}	18	12	.600	8–8	2.0
Detroit Shock ^{o}	17	13	.567	8–8	3.0
Washington Mystics ^{o}	3	27	.100	1–15	17.0

== Statistics ==
Legend
GP	Games played	GS	Games started	MPG	Minutes per game	RPG	Rebounds per game
APG	Assists per game	SPG	Steals per game	BPG	Blocks per game	PPG	Points per game
FG%	Field-goal percentage	3P%	3-point field-goal percentage	FT%	Free-throw percentage	TO	Turnovers per game
PF	Fouls per game		Team leader		League leader

=== Regular season ===
Player	GP	GS	MPG	FG%	3P%	FT%	RPG	APG	SPG	BPG	PPG
Korie Hlede	27	27	33.8	.391	.392	.806	5.2	2.7	0.8	0.0	14.1
Sandy Brondello	30	28	33.1	.428	.364	.923	2.9	3.3	1.3	0.0	14.2
Cindy Brown	30	30	32.2	.470	.328	.707	10.0	1.8	1.7	0.7	11.8
Carla Boyd	30	24	27.2	.342	.302	.632	3.9	2.3	0.9	0.3	8.2
Razija Brcaninovic	30	30	23.2	.520	N/A	.667	5.1	1.0	0.3	0.9	9.1
Rachael Sporn	30	1	17.8	.408	N/A	.500	3.6	1.3	0.3	0.4	4.5
Lynette Woodard	27	8	14.2	.387	N/A	.575	2.4	0.8	0.8	0.1	3.5
Rhonda Blades	29	2	11.7	.256	.240	.483	1.1	1.4	1.4	0.0	2.3
Mfon Udoka	3	0	8.3	.167	N/A	.500	1.0	0.0	0.0	0.0	1.3
Gergana Branzova	26	0	7.8	.446	.000	.550	1.6	0.3	0.1	0.2	2.7
Aneta Kausaite	10	0	5.8	.250	.000	.571	1.1	0.1	0.3	0.0	1.4
Angela Hamblin	6	0	4.8	.250	.500	.500	1.2	0.3	0.2	0.0	1.0
Tajama Abraham	12	0	3.7	.357	N/A	.533	0.6	0.0	0.2	0.1	1.5

^{‡}Waived/Released during the season
^{†}Traded during the season
^{≠}Acquired during the season
