= 2004 Detroit Shock season =

- Head coach: Bill Laimbeer
- Arena: The Palace of Auburn Hills

Results
- Record: 17–17 (.500)
- Place: 3rd (Eastern)
- Playoff finish: Lost First Round (2-1) to New York Liberty

The 2004 WNBA season was the seventh season for the Detroit Shock. They were unable to defend their title the year before, losing in the first round to the New York Liberty.

== Offseason ==
=== Dispersal Draft ===
Based on the Shock's 2004 record, they would pick 13th in the Cleveland Rockers dispersal draft. The Shock picked Jennifer Rizzotti.

=== WNBA draft ===
Round	Pick	Player	Nationality	College/School/Team
1	11	Iciss Tillis (C/F)	United States	Duke
1	13	Shereka Wright (F)	United States	Purdue
2	23	Erika Valek (G)	United States	Purdue
3	32	Jennifer Smith (C)	United States	Michigan

== Regular season ==
=== Season standings ===
Eastern Conference	W	L	PCT	GB	Home	Road	Conf.
Connecticut Sun ^{x}	18	16	.529	–	10–7	8–9	14–6
New York Liberty ^{x}	18	16	.529	–	11–6	7–10	10–10
Detroit Shock ^{x}	17	17	.500	1.0	8–9	9–8	11–9
Washington Mystics ^{x}	17	17	.500	1.0	11–6	6–11	9–11
Charlotte Sting ^{o}	16	18	.471	2.0	10–7	6–11	8–12
Indiana Fever ^{o}	15	19	.441	3.0	10–7	5–12	8–12

=== Season schedule ===
Date	Opponent	Score	Result	Record
May 22	@ San Antonio	73-60	Win	1-0
May 26	@ New York	52-64	Loss	1-1
May 29	Los Angeles	60-63	Loss	1-2
June 2	Washington	63-65	Loss	1-3
June 6	@ Connecticut	74-73	Win	2-3
June 9	@ Indiana	83-79	Win	3-3
June 11	@ Washington	74-60	Win	4-3
June 12	Indiana	72-68	Win	5-3
June 19	@ Sacramento	84-74	Win	6-3
June 22	Washington	72-78	Loss	6-4
June 23	@ Charlotte	65-60	Win	7-4
June 25	@ Connecticut	67-71 (OT)	Loss	7-5
June 27	Connecticut	72-74	Loss	7-6
June 29	Indiana	68-69	Loss	7-7
July 3	@ Minnesota	70-78	Loss	7-8
July 6	Houston	82-63	Win	8-8
July 10	Seattle	70-65	Win	9-8
July 12	Sacramento	51-67	Loss	9-9
July 15	@ Houston	61-97	Loss	9-10
July 16	@ Indiana	73-85	Loss	9-11
July 18	San Antonio	77-71	Win	10-11
July 21	Connecticut	68-78	Loss	10-12
July 23	Charlotte	63-53	Win	11-12
July 24	@ New York	69-78	Loss	11-13
July 28	@ Washington	73-65	Win	12-13
July 30	New York	88-79	Win	13-13
August 1	Minnesota	58-59	Loss	13-14
September 1	Phoenix	58-63	Loss	13-15
September 4	@ Charlotte	66-58	Win	14-15
September 8	@ Seattle	67-86	Loss	14-16
September 9	@ Los Angeles	63-81	Loss	14-17
September 11	@ Phoenix	80-72	Win	15-17
September 14	New York	82-71 (OT)	Win	16-17
September 19	Charlotte	68-54	Win	17-17

== Playoffs ==
Game	Date	Opponent	Score	Result	Record
Eastern Conference Semifinals
1	September 24	New York	62-75	Loss	0-1
2	September 26	@ New York	76-66	Win	1-1
3	September 28	@ New York	64-66	Loss	1-2

== Player stats ==
Note: GP = Games played; REB = Rebound; AST = Assists; STL = Steals; BLK = Blocks; PTS = Points

Player	GP	REB	AST	STL	BLK	PTS
Swin Cash	32	208	135	44	29	526
Deanna Nolan	34	134	112	66	12	464
Ruth Riley	34	199	50	31	53	378
Cheryl Ford	31	297	34	41	25	329
Merlakia Jones	33	69	21	19	2	180
Elaine Powell	30	84	134	36	8	133
Barbara Farris	26	61	7	8	2	118
Chandi Jones	31	34	45	18	5	107
Iciss Tillis	31	39	13	9	8	83
Isabel Sanchez	10	5	3	2	0	22
Ayana Walker	18	26	6	1	4	18
Stacy Stephens	7	9	3	0	0	4
Jae Kingi-Cross	5	1	1	0	0	3
Amisha Carter	2	4	0	2	0	1
Stacey Thomas	1	0	0	0	0	0
