= 2005 Detroit Shock season =

- Head coach: Bill Laimbeer
- Arena: The Palace of Auburn Hills

Results
- Record: 16–18 (.471)
- Place: 4th (Eastern)
- Playoff finish: Lost First Round (2-0) to Connecticut Sun

The 2005 WNBA season was the eighth for the Detroit Shock. Although they played mediocre basketball, the Shock barely made the playoffs, as they eventually made a quick exit from the playoffs, losing in a sweep by the Connecticut Sun.

== Offseason ==
=== WNBA draft ===
Round	Pick	Player	Nationality	School/Club team
1	7	Kara Braxton (F)	United States	Georgia
1	13	Dionnah Jackson (F)	United States	Oklahoma
2	20	Nikita Bell (F/G)	United States	North Carolina
3	33	Jenni Lingor (G)	United States	Southwest Missouri State

== Regular season ==
=== Season standings ===
Eastern Conference	W	L	PCT	GB	Home	Road	Conf.
Connecticut Sun ^{x}	26	8	.765	–	14–3	12–5	13–7
Indiana Fever ^{x}	21	13	.618	5.0	14–3	7–10	14–6
New York Liberty ^{x}	18	16	.529	8.0	10–7	8–9	9–11
Detroit Shock ^{x}	16	18	.471	10.0	12–5	4–13	11–9
Washington Mystics ^{o}	16	18	.471	10.0	10–7	6–11	9–11
Charlotte Sting ^{o}	6	28	.176	20.0	5–12	1–16	4–16

=== Season schedule ===
Date	Opponent	Score	Result	Record
May 21	Connecticut	78-67	Win	1-0
May 22	@ New York	78-71	Win	2-0
May 24	San Antonio	74-65	Win	3-0
June 3	New York	68-66 (OT)	Win	4-0
June 8	Seattle	61-76	Loss	4-1
June 10	Charlotte	69-55	Win	5-1
June 12	@ New York	69-72	Loss	5-2
June 15	@ Indiana	79-84 (OT)	Loss	5-3
June 18	@ Connecticut	63-73	Loss	5-4
June 24	Washington	55-69	Loss	5-5
June 26	Los Angeles	79-73	Win	6-5
July 1	Sacramento	63-80	Loss	6-6
July 5	Houston	66-75	Loss	6-7
July 7	@ Washington	76-62	Win	7-7
July 13	@ Minnesota	61-71	Loss	7-8
July 15	@ Indiana	57-62	Loss	7-9
July 17	Indiana	58-59	Loss	7-10
July 20	Connecticut	66-57	Win	8-10
July 23	@ Seattle	71-74	Loss	8-11
July 24	@ Sacramento	51-91	Loss	8-12
July 30	@ Connecticut	75-66	Win	9-12
July 31	Phoenix	66-63	Win	10-12
August 2	@ Houston	61-62	Loss	10-13
August 6	@ Charlotte	73-82 (2OT)	Loss	10-14
August 7	New York	72-67	Win	11-14
August 9	Charlotte	71-64	Win	12-14
August 11	Minnesota	72-66 (OT)	Win	13-14
August 13	@ San Antonio	60-59	Win	14-14
August 16	@ Phoenix	51-58	Loss	14-15
August 19	@ Los Angeles	67-74	Loss	14-16
August 21	Washington	66-52	Win	15-16
August 23	@ Charlotte	49-56	Loss	15-17
August 25	Indiana	55-40	Win	16-17
August 27	@ Washington	67-76	Loss	16-18

== Playoffs ==
Game	Date	Opponent	Score	Result	Record
Eastern Conference Semifinals
1	August 31	Connecticut	62-73	Loss	0-1
2	September 2	@ Connecticut	67-75	Loss	0-2

== Player stats ==
Player	GP	REB	AST	STL	BLK	PTS
Deanna Nolan	33	156	121	55	14	524
Cheryl Ford	33	322	26	33	46	313
Ruth Riley	33	156	39	23	46	251
Kara Braxton	33	100	14	18	13	227
Plenette Pierson	23	62	21	14	6	178
Elaine Powell	29	80	77	29	4	163
Chandi Jones	21	31	23	13	2	125
Katie Smith	13	28	26	5	3	124
Swin Cash	21	88	43	12	6	119
Barbara Farris	34	84	19	8	1	83
Ayana Walker	12	47	13	6	10	59
Sheila Lambert	12	17	21	8	1	33
Andrea Stinson	18	12	13	3	0	22
Niele Ivey	12	12	10	6	0	14
Stacey Thomas	17	20	8	8	3	12

== Awards and honors ==
- Cheryl Ford, WNBA Peak Performer
