= DeMya Walker =

American basketball player (born 1977)

Personal information
- Born: November 28, 1977 (age 48) Mount Holly, New Jersey, U.S.
- Listed height: 6 ft 3 in (1.91 m)
- Listed weight: 200 lb (91 kg)

Career information
- High school: Rancocas Valley (Mount Holly, New Jersey)
- College: Virginia (1995–1999)
- WNBA draft: 1999: undrafted
- Playing career: 1999–present
- Position: Forward

Career history
- 2000–2002: Portland Fire
- 2003–2009: Sacramento Monarchs
- 2010–2011: Connecticut Sun
- 2011: Washington Mystics
- 2012–2013: New York Liberty

Career highlights
- WNBA All-Star (2005); WNBA champion (2005); 2× First-team All-ACC (1998, 1999); ACC All-Freshman Team (1996)
- Stats at WNBA.com
- Stats at Basketball Reference
Medals
Women's basketball
Representing the United States
Pan American Games
Bronze medal – third place	1999 Winnipeg	Team

DeMya Chakheia Walker (born November 28, 1977) is an American former professional basketball player.

== High school ==
Walker was born and grew up in Mount Holly, New Jersey, where she attended Rancocas Valley Regional High School and she set school records for career rebounds (851), rebound average per game (14.2 rpg), most rebounds in a game (29), most points in a season (675), and most career points (1,546).

In her senior year, she was named to the 1995 All-American first team by Street & Smith's New Jersey High School "Female Athlete of the Year", and Parade Magazine All-America Second Team as a high school senior.

== University of Virginia ==
Walker attended the University of Virginia and played on the women's basketball team (known as The Cavaliers) from 1995 to 1999.

By the time she graduated, she became Virginia's all-time leader in field goal percentage, as well as 332 career blocked shots which at the time was ranked 12th in the NCAA record books. She averaged 13.0 points per game and 6.9 rebounds per game during her career.

Her 1,583 points ranks her ninth in school history.

She was named the "Cavalier of the Year", and was an Honorable Mention All-America selection in her senior year (1998-99 season) after leading the team in scoring, rebounding, field goal percentage and blocked shots.

She is also a member of the Zeta Phi Beta Sorority.

== USA Basketball ==
Walker was selected to play with the USA team at the 1999 Pan American Games. The team finished with a record of 4–3, but won the bronze medal with an 85–59 victory over Brazil. Walker averaged 1.6 points per game.

== WNBA career ==
Despite her impressive career in college, Walker was not selected by any of the WNBA teams during the 1999 WNBA draft, mainly due to the influx of former players from the just-disbanded American Basketball League (ABL), a rival professional women's league. Several of the ABL's star players were selected in that year's draft.

However, prior to the start of the 1999 WNBA season, Walker was assigned to the Minnesota Lynx for its pre-season training camp, but was cut from the team final roster shortly afterwards. Walker spent that summer playing overseas on a professional women's league team in Italy.

In 2000, she signed a free agent contract with the Portland Fire, and played with them for three seasons until the team was disbanded due to financial difficulties at the end of the 2002 season.

On April 24, 2003, the WNBA held a dispersal draft, where various former players from the newly-defunct Portland Fire and Miami Sol teams were chosen by the existing WNBA teams. Walker was selected by the Sacramento Monarchs, as the fifth overall pick in this draft. Walker played the 2003–08 seasons with the Monarchs, and even helped the team win the 2005 WNBA Finals by defeating the Connecticut Sun, three games to one.

When the Monarchs folded prior to the 2010 WNBA season, Walker was selected by the Connecticut Sun in the 2010 dispersal draft.

== Career statistics ==
Legend
GP	Games played	GS	Games started	MPG	Minutes per game	RPG	Rebounds per game
APG	Assists per game	SPG	Steals per game	BPG	Blocks per game	PPG	Points per game
TO	Turnovers per game	FG%	Field-goal percentage	3P%	3-point field-goal percentage	FT%	Free-throw percentage
**Bold**	Career best	°	League leader

=== WNBA ===
==== Regular season ====
Year	Team	GP	GS	MPG	FG%	3P%	FT%	RPG	APG	SPG	BPG	TO	PPG
2000	Portland	30	1	10.4	39.8	0.0	46.8	1.6	0.6	0.6	0.2	1.2	3.1
2001	Portland	21	0	14.1	44.0	66.7	57.5	2.8	0.5	0.3	0.6	1.7	5.4
2002	Portland	31	29	**27.4**	48.4	16.7	62.1	5.0	1.6	0.8	**1.1**	2.9	10.9
2003	Sacramento	**34**	21	21.8	45.9	13.3	58.0	4.4	1.4	0.7	0.7	2.0	9.0
2004	Sacramento	**34**	**34**	26.0	41.6	0.0	60.2	4.2	**2.5**	0.8	0.4	2.5	8.4
2005	Sacramento	22	19	27.2	**53.4**	**100.0**	64.5	**5.3**	2.2	**1.3**	0.6	3.1	**14.1**
2006	Sacramento	23	8	18.9	43.6	0.0	65.5	4.0	1.4	0.7	0.3	1.6	9.3
2007	Sacramento	5	5	21.0	40.5	0.0	71.4	5.0	1.2	0.6	0.6	3.0	8.8
2008	Sacramento	7	0	7.4	45.5	0.0	50.0	0.9	0.1	0.7	0.0	1.4	1.6
2009	Sacramento	**34**	30	24.1	47.6	0.0	72.6	4.6	1.9	0.8	0.5	2.7	8.6
2010	Connecticut	31	2	11.0	41.9	0.0	**82.6**	2.1	0.8	0.5	0.2	1.3	4.1
2011	Connecticut	10	0	8.0	42.1	0.0	72.7	1.6	0.0	0.2	0.0	**1.1**	2.4
2011	Washington	20	5	20.5	39.2	0.0	73.7	4.0	1.2	0.4	0.4	1.7	6.3
2012	New York	33	8	15.9	39.4	0.0	59.3	2.8	1.0	0.5	0.5	1.9	3.0
Career	13 years, 5 teams	335	162	19.2	45.1	14.0	63.5	3.6	1.3	0.7	0.5	2.0	7.1

==== Playoffs ====
Year	Team	GP	GS	MPG	FG%	3P%	FT%	RPG	APG	SPG	BPG	TO	PPG
2003	Sacramento	6	6	28.3	43.6	0.0	55.0	4.5	1.7	0.2	0.5	3.5	9.8
2004	Sacramento	6	6	**28.8**	**55.6**	0.0	64.7	3.3	2.3	**1.0**	**1.3**	3.0	**11.8**
2005	Sacramento	6	0	27.5	50.0	0.0	75.0	3.0	**3.5**	0.5	0.0	2.8	10.2
2006	Sacramento	**9**	**9**	24.4	44.1	0.0	56.5	4.1	2.6	0.7	0.6	2.2	10.6
2008	Sacramento	3	0	15.7	50.0	0.0	**80.0**	**4.7**	0.3	0.7	0.0	2.0	6.7
2012	New York	2	0	9.5	0.0	0.0	50.0	3.0	0.0	0.0	0.5	**1.0**	0.5
Career	6 years, 2 teams	32	21	24.8	47.6	0.0	62.0	3.8	2.2	0.6	0.5	2.6	9.6

=== College ===
Year	Team	GP	GS	MPG	FG%	3P%	FT%	RPG	APG	SPG	BPG	TO	PPG
1995–96	Virginia	**33**	-	-	52.2	0.0	52.1	6.3	0.6	0.9	2.1	-	7.6
1996–97	Virginia	31	-	-	**59.8**	0.0	**72.7**	7.5	1.4	1.5	2.7	-	13.7
1997–98	Virginia	29	-	-	55.2	14.3	63.2	**8.4**	1.9	**2.0**	**3.3**	-	**16.3**
1998–99	Virginia	29	-	-	54.9	**28.6**	66.0	4.6	**2.8**	1.9	2.9	-	15.0
**Career**		122	-	-	55.7	21.7	64.9	6.7	1.6	1.6	2.7	-	13.0
Statistics retrieved from Sports-Reference.

== Personal ==
- Two months after the Monarchs won the title she announced her pregnancy.
- In April 2006, after going through an intense four days of labor, Walker gave a Caesarean section birth to her first child, a daughter named Zachara. She went on maternity leave and missed the first 11 games of the 2006 WNBA season, before returning to the Monarchs' player roster.
- Earned her degree from Virginia in Government.
- After playing days are over wants to be an attorney in mergers & acquisitions.
