= 2009 WNBA dispersal draft =

General information
- Sport: Basketball
- Date: December 14, 2009

Overview
- League: WNBA
- Merging teams: Sacramento Monarchs (folded in 2009)
- First selection: Nicole Powell; New York Liberty

The Women's National Basketball Association (WNBA) held their fifth dispersal draft on December 14, 2009.

This dispersal draft re-assigned players from the Sacramento Monarchs who folded in November 2009, prior to the start of the 2010 WNBA season. The remaining twelve active teams in the WNBA each selected one player from the 2009 Monarchs roster in the one-round draft. Teams drafted in inverse order of their 2009 regular season finish. All Monarchs players were available except for unrestricted free agents, Kara Lawson, Ticha Penicheiro, and Hamchetou Maiga-Ba.

== Key ==
Pos.	G	F	C
Position	Guard	Forward	Center

^{+}	Denotes player who has been selected for at least one All-Star Game

== Draft ==
The following players were drafted from the roster of the Sacramento Monarchs:

Pick	Player	Position	Nationality	New team
1	Nicole Powell ^{+}	G/F	United States	New York Liberty
2	Rebekkah Brunson ^{+}	F	United States	Minnesota Lynx
3	DeMya Walker ^{+}	F	United States	Connecticut Sun
4	Courtney Paris	C	United States	Chicago Sky
5	Laura Harper	F/C	United States	San Antonio Silver Stars
6	Kristin Haynie	G	United States	Washington Mystics
7	Scholanda Robinson	G	United States	Tulsa Shock
8	No selection	–	–	Los Angeles Sparks
9	No selection	–	–	Atlanta Dream
10	Chelsea Newton	G	United States	Seattle Storm
11	No selection	–	–	Indiana Fever
12	No selection	–	–	Phoenix Mercury
