= Kristin Haynie =

American basketball player (born 1983)

Central Michigan Chippewas
- Title: Head coach
- League: MAC

Personal information
- Born: June 17, 1983 (age 43) Lansing, Michigan, U.S.
- Listed height: 5 ft 9 in (1.75 m)
- Listed weight: 147 lb (67 kg)

Career information
- High school: Mason (Mason, Michigan)
- College: Michigan State (2001–2005)
- WNBA draft: 2005: 1st round, 9th overall pick
- Drafted by: Sacramento Monarchs
- Playing career: 2005–2012
- Position: Guard
- Number: 4
- Coaching career: 2012–present

Career history

Playing
- 2005–2007: Sacramento Monarchs
- 2008: Atlanta Dream
- 2009: Detroit Shock
- 2009: Sacramento Monarchs

Coaching
- 2012–2014: Eastern Michigan (assistant)
- 2014–2019: Central Michigan (assistant)
- 2019–2023: Michigan State (assistant)
- 2023–present: Central Michigan

Career highlights
- WNBA champion (2005); First-team All-Big Ten (2005); Big Ten Tournament MOP (2005); Big Ten All-Freshman Team (2002)
- Stats at WNBA.com
- Stats at Basketball Reference

Kristin Lynne Haynie (born June 17, 1983) is an American former basketball player in the Women's National Basketball Association (WNBA) and current head coach for the Central Michigan women's team.

== Early life ==
Haynie was raised in Mason, Michigan. In high school, she played on the varsity team since her freshman year, and graduated from Mason High School in 2001.

== College career ==
Haynie was the starting point guard for the Michigan State University Spartans all four years. She was instrumental in their 2005 Big Ten Championship and first ever trip to the Final 4. During her senior year, the Michigan State Women's Basketball Team had an excellent season, capturing 33 wins (including beating powerhouse programs like UConn, Tennessee and Notre Dame). Michigan State finally fell to Baylor University in the National Championship game. Haynie is frequently mentioned in the Michigan State Women's Basketball Record Book. One of her most impressive accomplishments was being the first and only woman (until 2017) to complete a triple double (points, assists and steals) in the NCAA tournament.

== Professional career ==
Haynie was drafted by the Sacramento Monarchs ninth overall in the 2005 WNBA draft. The Monarchs ended up winning the 2005 WNBA Championship in her rookie year. She is the only player to have played in the NCAA finals as well as the WNBA finals in the same year.

On February 6, 2008, Haynie was selected by the Atlanta Dream in their expansion draft.

She also played for Paleo Faliro in Greece during the 2008–09 WNBA off-season.

She returned to the Sacramento Monarchs after being traded from the Detroit Shock halfway through the 2009 season, and remained until the team was disbanded at the end of that season. Haynie was selected by the Washington Mystics in the 2010 dispersal draft, but never played a game in a Mystics uniform, and has not signed with another WNBA team since, though she continued to play professionally in Europe.

== Coaching career ==
=== Assistant coaching ===
After completion of the 2012 professional season in Italy, Haynie was hired as a women's basketball assistant coach at Eastern Michigan University.

After two seasons with the Eagles and developing a point guard of the year, she went into personal training. About row months later, Central Michigan (CMU)'s head coach, Sue Guevara, offered her a position on her coaching staff. Haynie helped lead Central Michigan to 2015 and 2016 MAC West Championships. In 2016 her point guard, Presley Hudson, was awarded Freshman of the Year. In 2017 CMU won the regular season conference outright, with the point guard earning 1st Team all MAC honors.

Haynie was an assistant coach at Michigan State from 2018 to the end of the 2022-23 season.

Haynie became an assistant coach for the Minnesota Lynx of the WNBA in March 2023.

=== Head coaching ===
On April 20, 2023, soon after being hired by the Lynx, Haynie returned to CMU to become their new head coach.

== Career statistics ==
Legend
GP	Games played	GS	Games started	MPG	Minutes per game	RPG	Rebounds per game
APG	Assists per game	SPG	Steals per game	BPG	Blocks per game	PPG	Points per game
TO	Turnovers per game	FG%	Field-goal percentage	3P%	3-point field-goal percentage	FT%	Free-throw percentage
**Bold**	Career best	°	League leader

†	Denotes season(s) in which Haynie won a WNBA championship

=== Regular season ===
WNBA regular season statistics
Year	Team	GP	GS	MPG	FG%	3P%	FT%	RPG	APG	SPG	BPG	TO	PPG
2005^{†}	Sacramento	30	0	14.5	34.2	15.6	82.6	**2.1**	1.4	1.1	0.0	1.2	3.5
2006	Sacramento	**34**	0	13.9	36.4	30.0	**84.0**	2.0	2.0	0.8	0.1	1.4	4.1
2007	Sacramento	**34**	2	16.0	35.3	**48.9**	80.0	1.1	2.1	0.5	**0.2**	2.0	3.7
2008	Atlanta	33	**3**	14.7	31.6	31.3	75.0	1.7	**2.5**	0.9	0.1	1.4	2.8
2009	Detroit	20	2	8.1	**42.5**	23.1	77.8	1.3	0.6	0.7	0.0	**0.5**	2.2
2009	Sacramento	9	1	**17.3**	33.3	33.3	83.3	1.7	2.0	**1.4**	0.1	1.7	**5.2**
**Career**	5 years, 3 teams	160	8	14.1	35.1	32.3	80.2	1.6	1.8	0.8	0.1	1.4	3.5

=== Playoffs ===
WNBA playoff statistics
Year	Team	GP	GS	MPG	FG%	3P%	FT%	RPG	APG	SPG	BPG	TO	PPG
2005^{†}	Sacramento	8	0	12.9	36.8	0.0	66.7	1.8	1.0	**1.0**	0.0	**0.5**	2.3
2006	Sacramento	**9**	0	14.0	46.7	29.4	**100.0**	**1.9**	**2.0**	0.9	0.0	1.0	**5.8**
2007	Sacramento	3	0	**16.7**	**50.0**	**60.0**	**100.0**	1.7	**2.0**	0.3	**0.3**	1.3	5.7
**Career**	3 years, 1 team	20	0	14.0	44.7	34.8	84.6	1.8	1.6	0.9	0.1	0.9	4.4

=== College ===
NCAA statistics
Year	Team	GP	Points	FG%	3P%	FT%	RPG	APG	SPG	BPG	PPG
2001–02	Michigan State	32	251	38.2	33.3	75.3	3.8	3.7	2.4	0.1	7.8
2002–03	Michigan State	29	293	43.1	**39.7**	**85.3**	3.7	5.0	2.3	0.1	10.1
2003–04	Michigan State	31	277	42.1	31.0	83.8	4.5	4.0	2.7	0.1	8.9
2004–05	Michigan State	**35**	**378**	**45.8**	37.7	82.1	**6.6**	**5.4**	**3.3**	0.1	**10.8**
**Career**		127	1199	42.7	35.5	81.3	4.7	4.5	2.7	0.1	9.4

== Head coaching record ==
=== College ===
Record table
Season	Team	Overall	Conference	Standing	Postseason
Central Michigan Chippewas (Mid-American Conference) (2023–present)
2023–24	Central Michigan	6–22	4–14	11th	
2024–25	Central Michigan	12–16	7–9	7th	
2025–26	Central Michigan	18–12	12–6	4th	
Central Michigan:		36–50 (.419)	23–29 (.442)		
Total:		36–50 (.419)			
National champion Postseason invitational champion Conference regular season champion Conference regular season and conference tournament champion Division regular season champion Division regular season and conference tournament champion Conference tournament champion

== Personal life ==
Haynie is married and has two children.

Haynie was inducted into the Michigan State University Athletic Hall of Fame in 2017.
