= 2005 WNBA Finals =

Basketball series

Team	Coach	Wins
Sacramento Monarchs	John Whisenant	3
Connecticut Sun	Mike Thibault	1
- Dates: September 14 - 20
- MVP: Yolanda Griffith (Sacramento Monarchs)
- Hall of Famers: Monarchs: Yolanda Griffith (2021); Sun: Lindsay Whalen (2022)
- Eastern finals: Connecticut defeated Indiana, 2–0
- Western finals: Sacramento defeated Houston, 2–0

The 2005 WNBA Finals was the best-of-five championship series for the 2005 season of the Women's National Basketball Association (WNBA). The Sacramento Monarchs, top-seeded champions of the Western Conference, defeated the Connecticut Sun, top-seeded champions of the Eastern Conference, three games to one in a best-of-five series. This was Sacramento's first and only title, as the franchise later folded in 2009.

The Monarchs made their first appearance in the Finals in franchise history. The Sun appeared in the Finals for the second straight time after having lost to Seattle in 2004.

Going into the series, neither team had won a WNBA championship.

The Sun's 26–8 record gave them home court advantage over Sacramento (25–9).

== Road to the finals ==
Sacramento Monarchs		Connecticut Sun
25–9 (.735); 1st West, 2nd overall	Regular season	26–8 (.765); 1st East, 1st overall
Defeated the (4) Los Angeles Sparks, 2–0	Conference Semifinals	Defeated the (4) Detroit Shock, 2–0
Defeated the (3) Houston Comets, 2–0	Conference Finals	Defeated the (2) Indiana Fever, 2–0

=== Regular season series ===
The Sun won the regular season series against the Monarchs:

June 24

Recap

Connecticut Sun 61, Sacramento Monarchs 50

ARCO Arena, Sacramento

June 28

Recap

Sacramento Monarchs 66, Connecticut Sun 70

Mohegan Sun Arena, Connecticut

== Game summaries ==
All times listed below are Eastern Daylight Time.

=== Game 1 ===
ESPN2

September 14
7:30pm

Recap

Sacramento Monarchs 69, Connecticut Sun 65
Scoring by half: 27–31, 42–34
Pts: Griffith 25; Rebs: Griffith 9 Asts: Penicheiro 8	Pts: Sales 23; Rebs: McWilliams-Franklin 10; Asts: Sales 4
Sacramento leads series, 1–0

Mohegan Sun Arena, Connecticut
Attendance: 8,157
Referees:
- Humphrey
- Price
- Napier

In an electric atmosphere, Yolanda Griffith came through with a powerful performance.

Griffith scored 19 of her 25 points in the second half as the Sacramento Monarchs posted a thrilling 69–65 victory over the Connecticut Sun in Game 1 of the WNBA Finals.

An Olympian and All-Star, Griffith helped the Monarchs make the Sun's home-court advantage useless in what is expected to be a tight best-of-five series.

With the crowd at Connecticut's Mohegan Sun Arena on its feet for virtually the entire second half, Griffith showed why she's one of the league's top players.

The 6'3" Griffith had her way near the basket over the final 20 minutes, making 8-of-10 shots. Her three-point play with 2:59 remaining gave the Monarchs a 63–59 lead.

=== Game 2 ===
ESPN2

September 15
7:30 pm

Recap

Sacramento Monarchs 70, Connecticut Sun 77 (OT)
Scoring by half: 39–38, 31–32 Overtime: 0–7
Pts: Griffith, Powell 16; Rebs: Griffith 9 Asts: Griffith, Newton 3	Pts: McWilliams-Franklin 24; Rebs: McWilliams-Franklin 16; Asts: Carey, Derevjanik, Sales 4
Series tied, 1–1

Mohegan Sun Arena, Connecticut
Attendance: 8,555
Referees:
- Blauch
- Enterline
- Mattingly

Brooke Wyckoff gave the desperate Connecticut Sun a leg to stand on.

Wyckoff's 3-pointer with two seconds left tied the game and the Sun pitched a shutout in overtime as they evened the WNBA Finals with a 77–70 victory over the mistake-prone Sacramento Monarchs.

Playing without injured star point guard Lindsay Whalen, the Sun were seconds away from an 0–2 deficit but got back in the best-of-five series. Games 3 and 4 are Sunday and Tuesday at Sacramento.

Perhaps Connecticut's best player, Whalen sat out with a non-displaced fracture of her left tibia and a sprained left ankle.

Whalen watched helplessly from the bench as two free throws each from DeMya Walker and Kara Lawson gave Sacramento a 70–67 lead with 8.6 seconds remaining.

After a timeout, the Sun inbounded to Katie Douglas, who momentarily held the ball but was not fouled by the Monarchs. She passed inside the arc to Taj McWilliams-Franklin, who drew inexplicable help defense from Ticha Penicheiro.

McWilliams-Franklin passed to the right corner to an open Wyckoff, whose shot splashed through to force overtime and bring a roar from the crowd at Mohegan Sun Arena.

=== Game 3 ===
ABC

September 18
3:30 pm

Recap

Connecticut Sun 55, Sacramento Monarchs 66
Scoring by half: 31–35, 24–31
Pts: Sales 17; Rebs: McWilliams-Franklin 13; Asts: McWilliams-Franklin, Sales, Whalen 2	Pts: Griffith 19; Rebs: Griffith 11; Asts: Walker 4
Sacramento leads series, 2-1

ARCO Arena, Sacramento
Attendance: 14,073
Referees:
- Corteau
- Trammel
- Walker

The Connecticut Sun rallied within a basket before the Sacramento Monarchs moved within one win of a WNBA title.

Yolanda Griffith had 19 points and 11 rebounds and the Monarchs withstood a comeback by the Sun in a 66–55 victory that gave them a 2–1 lead in the WNBA Finals.

The Monarchs, who lost Game 2 in overtime after allowing a tying 3-pointer before the regulation buzzer, can claim their first championship with a win in Game 4 of the best-of-five series.

Griffith had a pair of baskets in a 9–0 burst that gave Sacramento its largest lead at 50–36 with just over 12 minutes to play. However, Connecticut used a 12–0 surge to get back in the game.

Two free throws by Nykesha Sales, who scored 17 points, made it 57–55 with 3:16 left. But those were the last points for the Sun, who appeared to wilt down the stretch.

After Kara Lawson went backdoor for a layup, Jamie Carey missed a fast-break layup and Sales missed underneath. Ticha Penicheiro split a pair of free throws for a 60–55 lead with 59 seconds to go.

Taj McWilliams-Franklin had 16 points and 13 boards for the Sun, who committed 16 turnovers and made just 10-of-19 free throws.

Connecticut All-Star guard Lindsay Whalen, who sat out Game 2 with knee and ankle injuries, returned but managed just two points and two assists with five turnovers in 23 minutes.

=== Game 4 ===
ESPN2

September 20
7:30 pm

Recap

Connecticut Sun 59, Sacramento Monarchs 62
Scoring by half: 31–25, 28–37
Pts: Jones 21; Rebs: McWilliams-Franklin 10; Asts: Whalen 5	Pts: Griffith 14; Rebs: Griffith 10; Asts: Walker 5
Sacramento wins WNBA Finals, 3-1

ARCO Arena, Sacramento
Attendance: 15,002
Referees:
- Enterline
- Napier
- Price

It took nine years, but the Sacramento Monarchs can finally call themselves WNBA royalty.

The Monarchs won their first WNBA title, riding All-Star Yolanda Griffith and rallying for a frantic 62–59 victory over the hard-luck Connecticut Sun.

An original WNBA franchise, the Monarchs won the best-of-five series in four games. They went 7–1 in the postseason, losing only Game 2 of this series in overtime at Connecticut.

Sacramento trailed by 11 points in the first half and led by 10 in the second half before the game came down to a final shot. With a chance to tie the game, Nykesha Sales fired an airball on a 3-pointer, allowing ARCO Arena to finally celebrate.

A former WNBA MVP and the team leader, Griffith had 14 points and 10 rebounds for her second straight double-double. She averaged 18.5 points and 9.8 rebounds in the series and was named Finals MVP.

== Awards ==
- 2005 WNBA champion: Sacramento Monarchs
- Finals MVP: Yolanda Griffith

== Rosters ==
2005 Sacramento Monarchs Finals roster
Players
Coaches

Pos.	No.	Nat.	Name	Height	Weight	From
F	32	(United States)	Brunson, Rebekkah	6' 3" (1.91m)	175 lb (79kg)	Georgetown
F	7	(United States)	Buescher, Erin	6' 3" (1.91m)	181 lb (82kg)	The Master's College
C	33	(United States)	Griffith, Yolanda	6' 4" (1.93m)	175 lb (79kg)	Florida Atlantic
G	4	(United States)	Haynie, Kristin	5' 9" (1.75m)	147 lb (67kg)	Michigan State
G	20	(United States)	Lawson, Kara	5' 9" (1.75m)	165 lb (75kg)	Tennessee
G	8	(China)	Lijie, Miao	5' 11" (1.8m)	153 lb (69kg)	China
F	9	(Mali)	Maiga-Ba, Hamchetou	6' 1" (1.85m)	160 lb (73kg)	Old Dominion
G	2	(United States)	Newton, Chelsea	5' 11" (1.8m)	150 lb (68kg)	Rutgers
G	21	(Portugal)	Penicheiro, Ticha	5' 11" (1.8m)	149 lb (68kg)	Old Dominion
F	14	(United States)	Powell, Nicole	6' 3" (1.91m)	170 lb (77kg)	Stanford
F	0	(United States)	Scott, Olympia	6' 2" (1.88m)	175 lb (79kg)	Stanford
F	22	(United States)	Walker, DeMya	6' 3" (1.91m)	168 lb (76kg)	Virginia

Head coach
(United States) John Whisenant (New Mexico State)
Assistant coaches
(United States) Tom Abatemarco (Dowling College)
(United States) Steve Shuman (Sacramento State)
(United States) Monique Ambers (Arizona State)
Athletic trainer
(United States) Jill Jackson (Sacramento State)

Legend

- (C) Team captain
- (DP) Unsigned draft pick
- (FA) Free agent
- (S) Suspended
- Injured

2005 Connecticut Sun Finals roster
Players
Coaches

Pos.	No.	Nat.	Name	Height	Weight	From
G	10	(United States)	Carey, Jamie	5' 6" (1.68m)	135 lb (61kg)	Texas
F	22	(United States)	Brungo, Jessica	6' 1" (1.85m)	165 lb (75kg)	Penn State
G	34	(United States)	Derevjanik, Jennifer	5' 10" (1.78m)	140 lb (64kg)	George Mason
G/F	32	(United States)	Douglas, Katie	6' 0" (1.83m)	165 lb (75kg)	Purdue
C	12	(Poland)	Dydek, Margo	7' 2" (2.18m)	223 lb (101kg)	Poland
F	15	(United States)	Jones, Asjha	6' 2" (1.88m)	196 lb (89kg)	Connecticut
F/C	11	(United States)	McWilliams-Franklin, Taj	6' 2" (1.88m)	184 lb (83kg)	St. Edward's College
G/F	42	(United States)	Sales, Nykesha	6' 0" (1.83m)	175 lb (79kg)	Connecticut
C	14	(Australia)	Summerton, Laura	6' 2" (1.88m)	167 lb (76kg)	Australia
G	13	(United States)	Whalen, Lindsay	5' 8" (1.73m)	150 lb (68kg)	Minnesota
F	43	(United States)	Willingham, Le'Coe	6' 0" (1.83m)	200 lb (91kg)	Auburn
F	21	(United States)	Wyckoff, Brooke	6' 1" (1.85m)	183 lb (83kg)	Florida State

Head coach
(United States) Mike Thibault (Saint Martin's)
Assistant coaches
(United States) Scott Hawk (Nebraska-Omaha)
(United States) Bernadette Mattox (Georgia)
Athletic trainer
(United States) Jen Brodeur
Strength and conditioning coach
(United States) Lisa Ciaravella (Lynn)

Legend

- (C) Team captain
- (DP) Unsigned draft pick
- (FA) Free agent
- (S) Suspended
- Injured
