= Nicole Powell =

American basketball player and coach (born 1982)

Personal information
- Born: June 22, 1982 (age 44) Sierra Vista, Arizona, U.S.
- Listed height: 6 ft 2 in (1.88 m)
- Listed weight: 170 lb (77 kg)

Career information
- High school: Mountain Pointe (Ahwatukee, Arizona)
- College: Stanford (2000–2004)
- WNBA draft: 2004: 1st round, 3rd overall pick
- Drafted by: Charlotte Sting
- Playing career: 2004–2014
- Position: Guard / forward
- Number: 14, 28
- Coaching career: 2013–present

Career history

Playing
- 2004: Charlotte Sting
- 2005–2009: Sacramento Monarchs
- 2010–2012: New York Liberty
- 2013: Tulsa Shock
- 2014: Seattle Storm

Career highlights
- As player: WNBA All-Star (2009); WNBA Most Improved Player (2005); WNBA champion (2005); 2× Pac-10 Player of the Year (2002, 2004); 3× Pac-10 Tournament MOP (2002–2004); First-team All-American – AP (2004); 3× Kodak All-American (2002–2004); 2× All-American – USBWA (2002, 2004); 2× Second-team All-American – AP (2002, 2003); Pac-12 All-Freshman Team (2001); 4× All All Pac-10 Team (2001-2004)
- Stats at WNBA.com
- Stats at Basketball Reference
Medals
Women's basketball
Representing the United States
Pan American Games
Silver medal – second place	2003 Santo Domingo	Team
FIBA Under-19 World Cup
Bronze medal – third place	2001 Czech Republic	Team
FIBA Under-18 Americas Championship
Gold medal – first place	2000 Argentina	Team

Nicole Kristen Powell (born June 22, 1982) is an American basketball coach who was the head women's basketball coach at University of California, Riverside. As a player, she had a standout collegiate career at Stanford University, Powell had an 11-year WNBA career most notably with the Sacramento Monarchs where she was an All-Star and won a WNBA Championship. Powell also played professionally overseas for Fenerbahçe Istanbul. Powell had previously served on the coaching staffs at Gonzaga, Oregon, and Grand Canyon before being named the head coach of UC Riverside in March 2020.

== Early life ==
Born in Sierra Vista, Arizona, Powell played for Mountain Pointe High School in Phoenix, where she was named a WBCA All-American. She also was named a 2000 Parade Magazine First Team All-American in 2000 and the Arizona Player of the Century by the Arizona Republic. She participated in the 2000 WBCA High School All-America Game where she scored fourteen points.

In addition, Powell during her high school years earned all-region selection in both tennis and track, won the state badminton singles championships in 1997, 1999 and 2000, won the state discus title in 2000, and was an Arizona 5A doubles runner-up in tennis in 2000.

== College ==
Powell played the forward position for Stanford University women's NCAA basketball team. During her tenure there, she broke many school records, was named an All-American three times, and won numerous awards. She majored in urban studies.

She was the first women's basketball player in the history of what is now the Pac-12 Conference to have achieved multiple triple-double games (that is, 10 totals or more in three different positive statistical categories) during the same season. Powell has since been joined by two other players: Brittany Boyd of California, who recorded two triple-doubles in the 2014–15 season, and Sabrina Ionescu of Oregon, who had multiple triple-doubles in all four of her college seasons (four in 2016–17, six in 2017–18, and eight in both 2018–19 and 2019–20). Powell and Ionescu are also the only NCAA Division I women's players to have recorded multiple triple-doubles in the NCAA tournament; Powell had two consecutive triple-doubles in 2002, while Ionescu had one each in 2018 and 2019.

=== Stanford statistics ===
Legend
GP	Games played	GS	Games started	MPG	Minutes per game
FG%	Field goal percentage	3P%	3-point field goal percentage	FT%	Free throw percentage
RPG	Rebounds per game	APG	Assists per game	SPG	Steals per game
BPG	Blocks per game	PPG	Points per game	**Bold**	Career high

Year	Team	GP	Points	FG%	3P%	FT%	RPG	APG	SPG	BPG	PPG
2001–02	Stanford	**35**	581	**49.0%**	**42.0%**	82.6%	9.3	**6.3**	1.6	0.3	16.6
2002–03	Stanford	23	432	48.1%	40.4%	**87.5%**	9.3	3.8	1.8	**0.6**	18.8
2003–04	Stanford	31	**627**	42.9%	36.0%	85.6%	**11.2**	4.1	**1.9**	0.5	**20.2**
Career		89	1640	46.3%	39.3%	85.1%	10.0	4.9	1.8	0.5	18.4

== Coaching ==
Powell spent one season, 2013–14, at Gonzaga as an assistant coach for coach Kelly Graves. After Graves accepted the head coaching position for the University of Oregon, Powell took the assistant coach position at Oregon for three years. The 2016–2017 season was the most successful under Powell's assistant coaching career; it included a top-five recruiting class in 2016, headlined by Ionescu; a run to the Elite 8 in the 2017 NCAA Tournament; winning 6 out of 23 games against Top 25 opponents; and finishing the season at #16.

In April 2017, Powell accepted the head coaching position at Grand Canyon University.

== WNBA career ==
Powell was picked No. 3 overall by the Charlotte Sting in the 2004 WNBA draft. She was used by the Sting as a utility player, appearing in 31 games.

On March 3, 2005, she was traded to the Sacramento Monarchs in a multi-player deal. The trade greatly aided the Monarchs in the 2005 season while Powell enjoyed a breakout year and eventually was named the recipient of that year's WNBA's Most Improved Player award. She played a pivotal role in the Monarchs' 2005 WNBA Finals victory over the Connecticut Sun. Although the Monarchs struggled in subsequent years, Powell's statistics continued to improve. In 2009, with several of her teammates hobbled by injuries, Powell averaged 16.7 points per game and was the best free throw shooter in the WNBA with 97.9% of attempts made. She also participated in the 2009 WNBA All-Star Game, where she scored 21 points off the bench. The Monarchs ceased operations following their 2009 season. The New York Liberty selected Powell with the first pick in the 2010 dispersal draft.

She was traded to the Tulsa Shock before the 2013 season and signed with the Seattle Storm before the 2014 season.

=== WNBA career statistics ===
Legend
GP	Games played	GS	Games started	MPG	Minutes per game	RPG	Rebounds per game
APG	Assists per game	SPG	Steals per game	BPG	Blocks per game	PPG	Points per game
TO	Turnovers per game	FG%	Field-goal percentage	3P%	3-point field-goal percentage	FT%	Free-throw percentage
**Bold**	Career best	°	League leader

†	Denotes season(s) in which Powell won a WNBA championship

==== Regular season ====
WNBA regular season statistics
Year	Team	GP	GS	MPG	FG%	3P%	FT%	RPG	APG	SPG	BPG	TO	PPG
2004	Charlotte	31	0	12.4	41.3	41.4	80.0	2.3	0.5	0.5	0.1	0.7	4.3
2005^{†}	Sacramento	34	34	29.1	37.9	**41.5**	80.6	3.6	1.8	1.1	**0.5**	1.3	10.7
2006	Sacramento	34	34	26.	37.5	35.3	81.6	3.9	1.8	1.2	0.4	1.4	9.6
2007	Sacramento	34	34	29.0	37.6	38.0	96.4	5.6	1.7	1.4	0.4	1.9	12.8
2008	Sacramento	34	33	27.8	36.8	41.1	84.0	4.4	1.4	1.2	0.2	1.8	13.6
2009	Sacramento	34	34	**30.4**	**41.6**	36.3	**97.9**	**5.9**	**2.3**	1.4	0.2	2.5	**16.7**
2010	New York	34	34	26.3	38.9	39.5	83.9	4.2	2.2	1.0	0.2	1.4	9.3
2011	New York	33	33	28.3	41.0	35.3	90.6	4.2	**2.3**	1.4	0.3	2.0	9.7
2012	New York	34	21	27.1	**41.6**	38.8	86.7	4.3	1.4	1.3	0.4	1.4	7.0
2013	Tulsa	32	20	22.3	40.6	36.2	81.5	3.7	1.3	0.8	0.2	0.9	6.4
2014	Seattle	26	0	13.0	26.1	25.0	77.8	1.8	0.3	0.8	0.1	**0.4**	2.2
**Career**	11 years, 4 teams	360	277	25.1	38.9	37.8	88.2	4.1	1.6	1.1	0.3	1.5	9.5

==== Playoffs ====
WNBA playoff statistics
Year	Team	GP	GS	MPG	FG%	3P%	FT%	RPG	APG	SPG	BPG	TO	PPG
2005^{†}	Sacramento	8	8	32.1	38.5	47.6	80.0	2.5	1.9	0.9	0.1	1.5	11.0
2006	Sacramento	**9**	**9**	28.2	**52.7**	50.0	84.6	4.6	1.6	1.6	0.1	**1.4**	11.8
2007	Sacramento	3	3	26.7	45.7	30.0	100.0	5.7	1.7	1.3	0.3	2.3	15.3
2008	Sacramento	3	3	30.0	51.3	25.0	100.0	**6.0**	**2.7**	1.0	0.3	2.3	**18.0**
2010	New York	5	5	25.6	44.4	38.1	100.0	2.8	1.8	0.4	0.2	**1.4**	7.6
2011	New York	3	3	**34.3**	50.0	**57.1**	100.0	**6.0**	**1.7**	**1.7**	**0.7**	2.0	16.7
2012	New York	2	2	32.0	38.9	36.4	0.0	3.0	1.5	0.5	0.5	1.5	9.0
**Career**	7 years, 2 teams	33	33	29.6	46.2	43.2	93.1	4.1	1.8	1.1	0.2	1.7	12.1

== USA Basketball ==
Powell was a member of the USA Women's U18 team which won the gold medal at the FIBA Americas Championship in Mar Del Plata, Argentina. The event was held in July 2000, when the USA team defeated Cuba to win the championship. Powell averaged 8.2 points per game and led the team in rebounding with 6.4 per game.

Powell was named to the USA Women's U19 team which represented the US in the 2001 U19 World's Championship, held in Brno, Czech Republic in July 2001. Powell scored 7.0 points per game, led the team in rebounding with 6.3 per game to help the USA team to a 6–1 record and the bronze medal.

In 2003, Powell helped the United States women's national basketball team win a silver medal at the Pan American Games in Santo Domingo, Dominican Republic. She also helped national teams win a bronze medal (in the Czech Republic) and a gold medal (in Argentina) at two other international tournaments.

== International career ==
She played for Basket Spezia in 2004–2005 season in Italy. In 2005–2006 for Fenerbahçe for the first time, also winning the country's championship, in 2006–2007 for Perfumerias Halcon Avenida in Spain, in 2007–2008 she played for CSKA Moscow in Russia.

During the 2008–2009 and 2009–2010 WNBA off-season, Powell contributed to Fenerbahçe's victories each year in the Turkish women's basketball league championship. And last, Powell was a player of Polish team – TS Wisła Kraków between 2010–2012.

== Awards and achievements ==
- WNBA All-Star (2009)
- WNBA Most Improved Player (2005)
- WNBA champion (2005)
- 2× WNBA free throw percentage leader: (2007, 2009)

== Head coaching record ==
Record table
Season	Team	Overall	Conference	Standing	Postseason
Grand Canyon Antelopes (WAC) (2017–2020)
2017–18	Grand Canyon	16–14	9–5	3rd	
2018–19	Grand Canyon	7–20	5–11	7th	
2019–20	Grand Canyon	15–12	10–6	2nd	Postseason cancelled due to COVID-19
Grand Canyon:		38–46 (.452)	24–22 (.522)		
UC Riverside (Big West) (2020–present)
2020–21	UC Riverside	7–12	5–9	9th	
2021–22	UC Riverside	14–11	10–6	4th	
2022–23	UC Riverside	5–23	3–15	11th	
UC Riverside:		26–46	18–30		
Total:		64–92 (.410)			
National champion Postseason invitational champion Conference regular season champion Conference regular season and conference tournament champion Division regular season champion Division regular season and conference tournament champion Conference tournament champion

== See also ==
- List of NCAA Division I basketball career triple-doubles leaders
