= Jenny Boucek =

American basketball player and coach

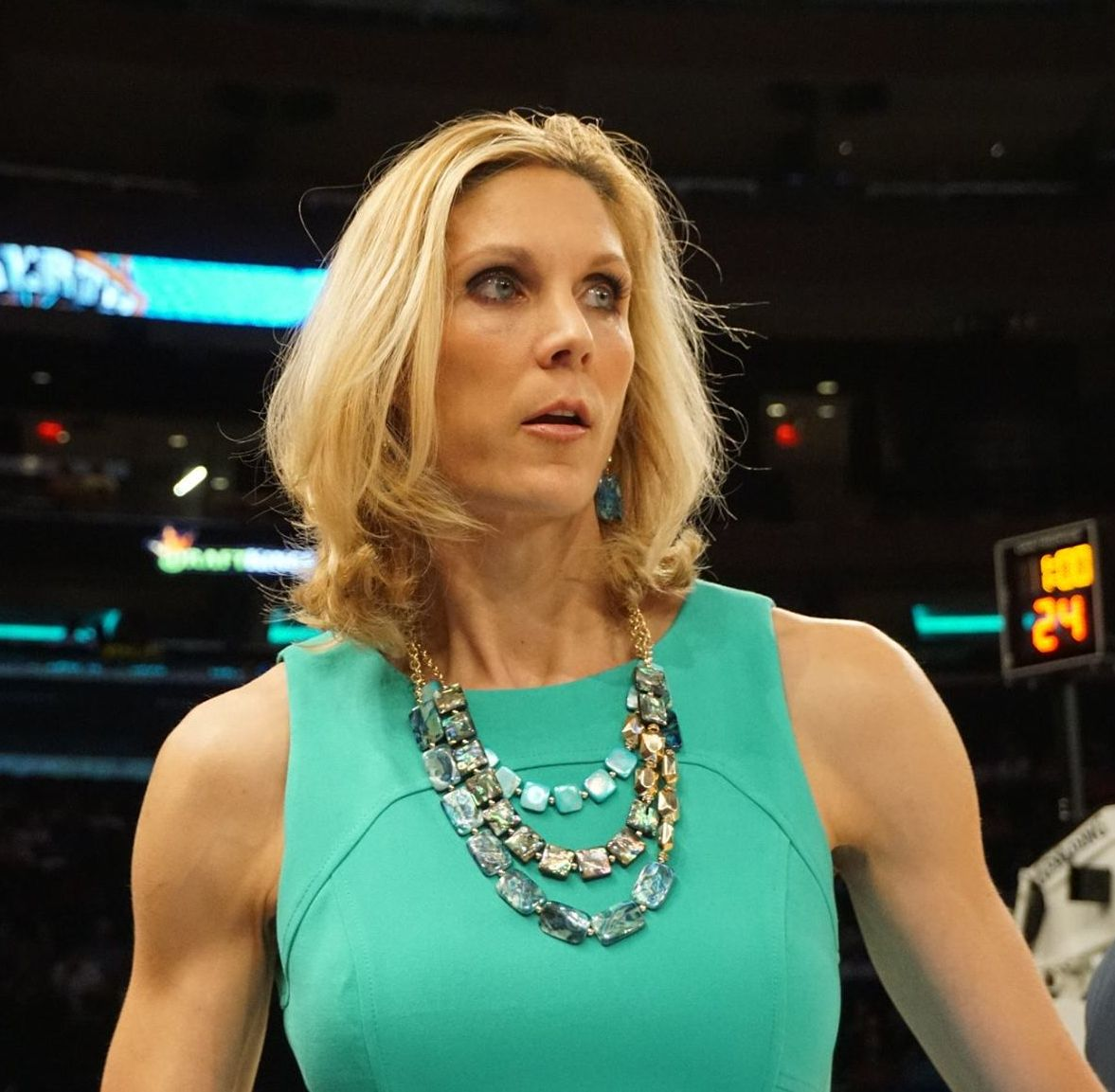
- Boucek in 2015

Indiana Pacers
- Title: Assistant coach
- League: NBA

Personal information
- Born: December 20, 1973 (age 52) Nashville, Tennessee, U.S.
- Listed height: 5 ft 8 in (1.73 m)
- Listed weight: 130 lb (59 kg)

Career information
- High school: University School of Nashville (Nashville, Tennessee)
- College: Virginia (1992–1996)
- WNBA draft: 1997: undrafted
- Playing career: 1997–1998
- Position: Guard
- Number: 10, 14
- Coaching career: 1999–present

Career history

Playing
- 1997: Cleveland Rockers
- 1997–1998: Keflavík

Coaching
- 1999: Washington Mystics (assistant)
- 2000–2002: Miami Sol (assistant)
- 2003–2005: Seattle Storm (assistant)
- 2007–2009: Sacramento Monarchs
- 2010–2014: Seattle Storm (assistant)
- 2015–2017: Seattle Storm
- 2017–2018: Sacramento Kings (assistant)
- 2018–2021: Dallas Mavericks (assistant)
- 2021–present: Indiana Pacers (assistant)

Career highlights
- As player: Úrvalsdeild Foreign Player of the Year (1998); Icelandic champion (1998); Icelandic Basketball Cup (1998); ACC All-Freshman Team (1993); As head coach: WNBA All–Star Game Head Coach (2007); As assistant coach: 2x WNBA champion (2004, 2010); WNBA All–Star Game Assistant Coach (2011)
- Stats at Basketball Reference

Jennifer Dawn Boucek (/ˈbuːsɛk/ BOO-sek; born December 20, 1973) is an American basketball coach and a former player. Boucek played college basketball for the University of Virginia and later professionally for the Cleveland Rockers in the WNBA and Keflavík in Iceland where she won both the national championship and the national cup, as well as being named the Foreign Player of the Year.

Boucek started her coaching career in 1999 as an assistant with the Washington Mystics. She later served as an assistant for the Miami Sol and the Seattle Storm before being named the head coach of the Sacramento Monarchs in 2007. After serving as an assistant coach for the Storm again, she became the head coach of the team in 2015. In 2018 she became the third woman to serve as an assistant coach in the NBA when she was hired by the Sacramento Kings. She later served as an assistant for the Dallas Mavericks and has been an assistant coach for the Indiana Pacers since 2021.

== College career ==
Boucek was a two-time GTE Academic All-American team member and two-time ACC selection. Boucek twice earned team Defensive Player of the Year honors and finished her career at Virginia as a member of the 1,000-point club. She also competed in the U.S. Olympic Festival in 1993.

Boucek graduated with honors in 1997 with a double major degree in sports medicine and sports management. She was given a free fifth year after her college playing career ended. She had six mini-internships during that year, including in sports medicine, sports information and sports psychology. Boucek graduated as No. 1 at Virginia's Curry School of Education and Human Development.

== Professional playing career ==
Boucek planned to enter med school but rumors of the WNBA's founding had her spending a month getting back into shape to attend a Cleveland Rockers open tryout. In 1997, she was one of a pair of women to earn a spot on the roster from 350 attendees to the tryout. Boucek played her first game with the Rockers on June 21, 1997, in a 56 - 76 loss to the Houston Comets, where she recorded 2 points and 2 rebounds. She would play in 10 of the Rockers' 28 games in the 1997 season, missing several games due to a stress fracture in her back. With her final game being on August 23, 1997 when the Rockers defeated the New York Liberty 72 - 71.

In November 1997, Boucek signed with Keflavík in the Icelandic top-tier 1. deild kvenna (now named Úrvalsdeild kvenna). She appeared in 18 league, playoffs and national cup games, with Keflavík winning 16 of those. Keflavík went on to win the national championship and the national cup with Boucek being named the Foreign Player of the Year after averaging 20.7 points, 5.9 rebounds and 4.4 assists per game.

She returned to the Cleveland Rockers in time for the 1998 season but was released prior to the start of the regular season on her own accord due to a torn hamstring.

== Career statistics ==
Legend
GP	Games played	GS	Games started	MPG	Minutes per game	RPG	Rebounds per game
APG	Assists per game	SPG	Steals per game	BPG	Blocks per game	PPG	Points per game
TO	Turnovers per game	FG%	Field-goal percentage	3P%	3-point field-goal percentage	FT%	Free-throw percentage
**Bold**	Career best	°	League leader

=== College ===
Year	Team	GP	GS	MPG	FG%	3P%	FT%	RPG	APG	SPG	BPG	TO	PPG
1992–93	Virginia	32	-	-	**54.2**	0.0	**70.6**	3.8	1.9	0.7	0.1	-	5.9
1993–94	Virginia	30	-	-	41.5	24.0	67.2	**4.6**	**4.2**	**1.4**	**0.2**	-	8.5
1994–95	Virginia	32	-	-	51.6	**30.6**	67.5	3.8	3.8	**1.4**	0.1	-	**9.9**
1995–96	Virginia	**33**	-	-	51.7	0.0	58.2	2.7	2.7	1.3	0.0	-	7.4
**Career**		127	-	-	49.3	27.0	65.7	3.7	3.1	1.2	0.1	-	7.9
Statistics retrieved from Sports-Reference.

=== Professional ===
==== WNBA ====
===== Regular season =====
Year	Team	GP	GS	MPG	FG%	3P%	FT%	RPG	APG	SPG	BPG	TO	PPG
1997	Cleveland	10	1	11.2	46.7	0.0	57.1	1.0	0.9	0.6	0.0	2.2	1.8
Career	1 year, 1 team	10	1	11.2	46.7	0.0	57.1	1.0	0.9	0.6	0.0	2.2	1.8

==== Iceland ====
Statistics
Year	Competition	Team	GP	MPG	2P%	3P%	FT%	RPG	APG	SPG	BPG	TO	PPG
1997–1998	1. deild	Keflavík	9	32.9	60.3	0.0	76.9	5.9	4.4	5.3	0.0	4.3	20.7
1997–1998	1. deild playoffs	Keflavík	6	37.0	55.6	25.0	75.8	4.3	3.2	5.0	0.0	3.0	18.2
1997–1998	Icelandic Cup	Keflavík	3	30.0	59.6	33.3	87.5	3.3	4.0	5.3	0.0	2.0	28.7
Regular season statistics - Playoff statistics - Cup statistics

== Coaching career ==
Boucek began her coaching career in the WNBA during the 1999 season as an assistant with the Washington Mystics. In 2000, she joined the Miami Sol, also as an assistant coach, for three seasons.

In 2003, Boucek joined the Seattle Storm as an assistant coach and in 2004, helped the team win the WNBA Finals Championship, beating the Connecticut Sun. She also served as one of the Storm's scouts for prospective college players during the NCAA basketball season. In addition to her official scouting duties, Boucek also served as a color commentator on several Fox Sports Net broadcasts of ACC women's basketball games. However, shortly after the 2005 WNBA season ended, Boucek declined to remain with the Storm for the upcoming 2006 season, citing personal reasons for her departure.

On November 15, 2006, the Sacramento Monarchs named Boucek as their new head coach for the 2007 WNBA season. On July 12, 2009, Sacramento Monarchs general manager John Whisenant announced the team relieved Boucek of her head coaching duties. She compiled a 40–41 record in two-plus years as Monarchs head coach. She was 19–15 in 2007, 18–16 in 2008, and 3–10 in 2009 at the time of her dismissal.

She regards Pacers coach Rick Carlisle as a friend and mentor with their shared background as standout basketball players at Virginia. He invited Boucek to spend time with his Mavericks staff in 2011 and for a month of 2014's training camp.

On January 20, 2015, the Seattle Storm named Boucek as head coach. On August 10, 2017, the Storm fired Boucek as head coach after compiling a 36–58 record for the franchise and, in particular, for a disappointing 2017 season.

On October 20, 2017, Boucek was announced as a player development coach for the Sacramento Kings, becoming the third woman assistant coach in NBA history.

On July 19, 2018, Boucek was announced as an assistant coach for the Dallas Mavericks, becoming the first female assistant coach in franchise history. She gave birth to her daughter Rylie twelve days later.

On July 16, 2021, Boucek was named an assistant coach of the Indiana Pacers, remaining with Rick Carlisle, who had hired her to join the Mavericks' staff three years earlier.

== Coaching record ==
Legend
Regular season	G	Games coached	W	Games won	L	Games lost	W–L %	Win–loss %
Playoffs	PG	Playoff games	PW	Playoff wins	PL	Playoff losses	PW–L %	Playoff win–loss %

Team	Year	G	W	L	W–L%	Finish	PG	PW	PL	PW–L%	Result
SAC	2007	34	19	15	.559	3rd in West	3	1	2	.333	Lost in Western Conference Semi-Finals
SAC	2008	34	18	16	.529	4th in West	3	1	2	.333	Lost in Western Conference Semi-Finals
SAC	2009	13	3	10	.231	(fired)	-	-	-	-	–
SEA	2015	34	10	24	.294	5th in West	-	-	-	-	Missed playoffs
SEA	2016	34	16	18	.471	4th in West	1	0	1	.000	Lost in 1st Round
SEA	2017	26	10	16	.385	(fired)	-	-	-	-	–
Career		175	76	99	.434		7	2	5	.286	

== See also ==
- List of female NBA coaches
