= Hamchétou Maïga =

Malian basketball player (born 1978)

Hamchétou Maïga-Ba
Personal information
- Born: 25 April 1978 (age 48) Bamako, Mali
- Listed height: 6 ft 2 in (1.88 m)
- Listed weight: 162 lb (73 kg)

Career information
- College: Old Dominion (1998–2002)
- WNBA draft: 2002: 1st round, 12th overall pick
- Drafted by: Sacramento Monarchs
- Playing career: 2002–2010
- Position: Forward
- Number: 99

Career history
- 2002–2006: Sacramento Monarchs
- 2007–2008: Houston Comets
- 2009: Sacramento Monarchs
- 2010: Minnesota Lynx

Career highlights
- WNBA champion (2005)
- Stats at WNBA.com
- Stats at Basketball Reference

Hamchétou Maïga-Ba (born 25 April 1978) is a Malian former professional women's basketball player who played in the WNBA. She is also a member of the Mali women's national basketball team.

== College career ==
Maïga was an All-American player her senior year at Old Dominion University, as well as a three time All-Colonial Athletic Association team member. Senior year, she led the team in scoring (13.7 ppg). She wins her first French championship title, which is also the first for her club. However, she did not participate in the French Cup final, as her contract was over, and she had to join her new WNBA franchise, the Minnesota Lynx. A free agent, she had signed with this franchise in February 2010, her former franchise of the Monarchs having announced its disappearance in November 2009.

== College statistics ==
Legend
GP	Games played	GS	Games started	MPG	Minutes per game
FG%	Field goal percentage	3P%	3-point field goal percentage	FT%	Free throw percentage
RPG	Rebounds per game	APG	Assists per game	SPG	Steals per game
BPG	Blocks per game	PPG	Points per game	**Bold**	Career high

Year	Team	GP	Points	FG%	3P%	FT%	RPG	APG	SPG	BPG	PPG
1998–99	Old Dominion	32	199	51.3	16.7	47.4	4.1	1.5	1.7	0.3	6.2
1999–00	Old Dominion University	**34**	**477**	**59.8**	-	**58.6**	7.5	1.7	**2.5**	0.5	**14.0**
2000–01	Old Dominion University	30	410	57.3	-	51.4	7.4	2.7	2.1	0.8	13.7
2001–02	Old Dominion University	**34**	397	57.0	**33.3**	49.5	**8.1**	**3.4**	1.9	**0.9**	11.7
Career	Old Dominion University	130	1483	57.1	22.2	52.4	6.8	2.3	2.1	0.6	11.4

== WNBA and overseas career ==
Drafted with the 10th overall pick in the 2002 WNBA draft, Maïga did not start a full season for a WNBA squad until the 2007 season. Starting all 34 games for Houston, Maïga averaged 9.1 points per game, along with 4 rebounds, 2.3 assists and 1.7 steals per game. she was # 25

During the 2008–09 WNBA offseason, she was playing in the Czech Republic with Brno. During the 2009–2010 offseason, she is playing in France with Tarbes GB.

== WNBA career statistics ==
Legend
GP	Games played	GS	Games started	MPG	Minutes per game	RPG	Rebounds per game
APG	Assists per game	SPG	Steals per game	BPG	Blocks per game	PPG	Points per game
TO	Turnovers per game	FG%	Field-goal percentage	3P%	3-point field-goal percentage	FT%	Free-throw percentage
**Bold**	Career best	°	League leader

†	Denotes seasons in which Maïga-Ba won a WNBA championship

=== Regular season ===
Year	Team	GP	GS	MPG	FG%	3P%	FT%	RPG	APG	SPG	BPG	TO	PPG
2002	Sacramento	23	3	8.6	.245	.000	.467	1.6	0.4	0.7	0.1	1.0	1.7
2003	Sacramento	22	0	8.6	.327	.000	.400	1.7	0.6	0.8	0.1	0.6	1.9
2004	Sacramento	**34**	0	14.1	.470	.000	.552	2.1	0.7	0.9	0.2	1.4	4.1
2005^{†}	Sacramento	**34**	0	12.0	.450	.000	.314	2.0	0.9	0.7	0.2	1.2	3.8
2006	Sacramento	**34**	7	15.7	.475	.000	.563	2.1	0.9	0.9	**0.3**	1.3	5.2
2007	Houston	**34**	**34**	**29.6**	.454	.200	**.833**	**4.0**	**2.3**	**1.7**	0.1	2.1	**9.1**
2008	Houston	26	22	22.7	**.492**	**.500**	.692	3.2	1.5	1.2	**0.3**	2.2	7.8
2009	Sacramento	**34**	5	19.9	.486	.000	.714	2.6	1.1	0.9	0.2	1.5	8.9
2010	Minnesota	**34**	9	13.7	.384	.000	.667	2.3	0.9	0.4	0.1	1.1	3.2
Career	9 years, 3 teams	275	80	16.5	.450	.200	.630	2.4	1.1	0.9	0.2	1.4	5.3

=== Playoffs ===
Year	Team	GP	GS	MPG	FG%	3P%	FT%	RPG	APG	SPG	BPG	TO	PPG
2003	Sacramento	4	0	3.8	.333	.000	.000	0.8	0.5	0.0	0.0	1.3	0.5
2004	Sacramento	6	0	11.3	.154	.000	.250	1.0	0.7	**1.2**	0.0	1.2	0.8
2005^{†}	Sacramento	8	0	10.3	**.500**	.000	.667	1.6	0.5	0.6	**0.4**	1.0	**3.8**
2006	Sacramento	**9**	0	**13.1**	.381	.000	**.800**	**1.7**	**1.3**	0.7	0.1	1.1	4.0
Career	4 year, 1 team	27	0	10.5	.381	.000	.600	1.4	0.8	0.7	0.1	1.1	2.7

== With Mali ==
Maïga was the captain of the Mali squad which won the FIBA Africa Championship for Women 2007. By winning the tournament, Mali qualified for the 2008 Summer Olympics. Maïga was the M.V.P. of the tournament.
