= 2008 Sacramento Monarchs season =

- Head coach: Jenny Boucek
- Arena: ARCO Arena

Results
- Record: 18–16 (.529)
- Place: 4th (Western)
- Playoff finish: Lost Western Conference Semifinals

The 2008 WNBA season was the 12th season for the Sacramento Monarchs. The team reached the playoffs for the man consecutive season. It was also their 9th and final playoff berth before folding a season later.

== Offseason ==
The following player was selected in the Expansion Draft:

- Kristin Haynie Sacramento Monarchs

=== Transactions ===
- April 18 The Monarchs signed Amy Sanders to a training camp contract.
- April 16 The Monarchs signed Janie Mitchell to a training camp contract.
- April 15 The Monarchs signed Dionne Marsh to a training camp contract.
- March 31 The Monarchs re-signed free agent DeMya Walker.
- March 4 The Monarchs re-signed free agent Ticha Penicheiro.
- March 3 The Monarchs re-signed free agents Rebekkah Brunson, Linda Frohlich and Nicole Powell.

=== WNBA draft ===
Pick	Player	Nationality	School/Club team
10	Laura Harper	United States	Maryland
38	A’Quonesia Franklin	United States	Texas A&M
40	Izabela Piekarska (from Indiana Fever)	Poland	UTEP
43	Charel Allen	United States	Notre Dame

== Preseason ==
Game	Date	Opponent	Result	Record
1	May 2	Seattle Storm	W 70–68	1–0
2	May 5	Washington Mystics	L 82–90 (OT)	1–1

== Regular season ==
=== Season standings ===
Western Conference	W	L	PCT	GB	Home	Road	Conf.
San Antonio Silver Stars ^{x}	24	10	.706	–	15–2	9–8	10–10
Seattle Storm ^{x}	22	12	.647	2.0	16–1	6–11	13–7
Los Angeles Sparks ^{x}	20	14	.588	4.0	12–5	8–9	12–8
Sacramento Monarchs ^{x}	18	16	.529	6.0	5–12	13–4	9–11
Houston Comets ^{o}	17	17	.500	7.0	13–4	4–13	10–10
Minnesota Lynx ^{o}	16	18	.471	8.0	10–7	6–11	8–12
Phoenix Mercury ^{o}	16	18	.471	8.0	9–8	7–10	8–12

=== Season schedule ===
Date	Opponent	Score	Result	Record
1	May 17	San Antonio	W 73–64	1–0
2	May 20	@ Seattle	L 62–74	1–1
3	May 22	@ Chicago	L 77–87	1–2
4	May 24	@ Connecticut	L 64–87	1–3
5	May 30	Houston	W 73–66	2–3
6	June 6	Detroit	L 70–84	2–4
7	June 8	@ New York	W 70–63	3–4
8	June 11	@ Washington	W 79–76	4–4
9	June 12	@ Minnesota	W 82–78	5–4
10	June 14	Los Angeles	L 66–74	5–5
11	June 20	vs. Connecticut	L 56–72	5–6
12	June 22	Chicago	W 82–70	6–6
13	June 24	@ Indiana	L 73–78	6–7
14	June 26	@ Minnesota	L 76–80	6–8
15	June 28	New York	W 82–78	7–8
16	July 1	Washington	W 87–81	8–8
17	July 3	@ San Antonio	L 67–68	8–9
18	July 5	@ Houston	L 65–73	8–10
19	July 8	Seattle	L 64–79	8–11
20	July 10	Los Angeles	W 87–69	9–11
21	July 12	Phoenix	W 105–97	10–11
22	July 18	Atlanta	W 77–73	11–11
23	July 20	@ Detroit	W 88–85	12–11
24	July 22	@ Atlanta	W 79–66	13–11
25	July 24	vs. Phoenix	W 83–74	14–11
26	July 26	Indiana	W 70–62	15–11
27	July 27	@ Seattle	L 71–77	15–12
28	August 28	@ Los Angeles	L 63–78	15–13
29	August 30	Houston	W 80–65	16–13
30	September 5	@ Phoenix	L 69–81	16–14
31	September 7	vs. Minnesota	W 78–71	17–14
32	September 9	vs. Seattle	W 77–74	18–14
33	September 13	@ San Antonio	L 69–77	18–15
34	September 15	@ Houston	L 81–90	18–16

- September 12 game against Houston was postponed due to Hurricane Ike.

== Player stats ==
Note: GP= Games played; REB= Rebounds; AST= Assists; STL = Steals; BLK = Blocks; PTS = Points; AVG = Average

= Indicates team leader

Player	GP	MIN	REB	AST	STL	BLK	PTS
Nicole Powell	34	944	150	46	40	6	463
Kara Lawson	32	829	82	67	28	2	391
Rebekkah Brunson	30	779	213	13	36	20	327
Ticha Penicheiro	33	856	99	172	67	4	284
Crystal Kelly	33	551	109	15	18	5	243
Adrian Williams-Strong	34	687	167	20	19	8	207
Scholanda Robinson	29	535	32	24	32	6	198
Laura Harper	34	560	137	12	15	20	188
Chelsea Newton	26	393	35	28	30	1	117
A’Quonesia Franklin	34	351	45	59	16	1	53
Kim Smith	21						33
Charel Allen	6						16
La’Tangela Atkinson	5						14
DeMya Walker	7						11

== Roster ==
2008 Sacramento Monarchs roster
Players
Coaches

Pos.	No.	Nat.	Name	Height	Weight	From
G	12	(United States)	Allen, Charel	5' 11" (1.8m)	135 lb (61kg)	Notre Dame
F	32	(United States)	Brunson, Rebekkah	6' 3" (1.91m)	175 lb (79kg)	Georgetown
G	10	(United States)	Franklin, A'Quonesia	5' 4" (1.63m)	154 lb (70kg)	Texas A&M
C	15	(United States)	Harper, Laura	6' 5" (1.96m)	190 lb (86kg)	Maryland
F	42	(United States)	Kelly, Crystal	6' 2" (1.88m)	190 lb (86kg)	Western Kentucky
G	20	(United States)	Lawson, Kara	5' 9" (1.75m)	165 lb (75kg)	Tennessee
G	2	(United States)	Newton, Chelsea	5' 11" (1.8m)	154 lb (70kg)	Rutgers
G	21	(Portugal)	Penicheiro, Ticha	5' 11" (1.8m)	145 lb (66kg)	Old Dominion
F	14	(United States)	Powell, Nicole	6' 2" (1.88m)	175 lb (79kg)	Stanford
G	5	(United States)	Robinson, Scholanda	5' 11" (1.8m)	165 lb (75kg)	LSU
F	8	(Canada)	Smith, Kim	6' 1" (1.85m)	158 lb (72kg)	Utah
F	22	(United States)	Walker, DeMya	6' 3" (1.91m)	168 lb (76kg)	Virginia
C	34	(United States)	Williams-Strong, Adrian	6' 5" (1.96m)	170 lb (77kg)	USC

Head coach
(United States) Jenny Boucek (Virginia)
Assistant coaches
(United States) Tom Abatemarco (Dowling)
(United States) Steve Shuman (Sacramento State)
(United States) Monique Ambers (Arizona State)
Athletic trainer
(United States) Jill Jackson (Sacramento State)

Legend

- (C) Team captain
- (DP) Unsigned draft pick
- (FA) Free agent
- (S) Suspended
- Injured

WNBA roster page

== Playoffs ==
Game	Date	Opponent	Result	Record
1	September 18	San Antonio	L 78–85	0–1
2	September 20	@ San Antonio	W 84–67	1–1
3	September 22	@ San Antonio	L 81–86 (OT)	1–2

== Awards and honors ==
- Rebekkah Brunson, All-WNBA Defensive Second Team
- Ticha Penicheiro, All-WNBA Defensive First Team
