= Chelsea Newton =

American basketball player and coach (born 1983)

Current position
- Title: Associate head coach
- Team: Texas A&M
- Conference: SEC

Biographical details
- Born: February 17, 1983 (age 43); Monroe, Louisiana, U.S.

Playing career
- 2000–2005: Rutgers
- 2005: Sacramento Monarchs
- 2006: Chicago Sky
- 2007–2009: Sacramento Monarchs
- Position: Shooting guard

Coaching career (HC unless noted)
- 2010–2015: Rutgers (asst.)
- 2015–2022: Georgia (asst.)
- 2022–present: Texas A&M (associate HC)

Accomplishments and honors

Awards
- WNBA champion (2005); WNBA All-Rookie Team (2005); WNBA All-Defensive Second Team (2007); Big East Defensive Player of the Year (2005)

Chelsea Newton (born February 17, 1983) is an American women's college basketball coach, currently the associate head coach at Texas A&M. Newton served as an assistant coach at Rutgers University from 2010 to 2015 and at Georgia from 2015 to 2022.

In 2006–07, Newton served as Director of player development for Rutgers’ National Runner-Up team. As a player, drafted in 2005 by the WNBA's Sacramento Monarchs in the 2nd round overall pick 22. A member of the 2005 World Champions Sacramento Monarchs. Also a member of the 2005 All-Rookie Team. In 2007, Newton was chosen to the WNBA's 2nd Team All- Defense. After Sacramento folded in 2009, she was drafted by the Seattle Storm in the 2010 WNBA dispersal draft, but later retired before even playing a game with them.

Newton also played internationally in Israel, Poland, and Italy.

Born in Monroe, Louisiana, Newton played for Carroll High School in Monroe, Louisiana. Received numerous basketball accolades but most importantly was a high academic achieved. She was the Valedictorian of her high school class. Newton was named a WBCA All-American. She participated in the 2001 WBCA High School All-America Game where she scored fourteen points.

== Career statistics ==
=== WNBA ===
Legend
GP	Games played	GS	Games started	MPG	Minutes per game	RPG	Rebounds per game
APG	Assists per game	SPG	Steals per game	BPG	Blocks per game	PPG	Points per game
TO	Turnovers per game	FG%	Field-goal percentage	3P%	3-point field-goal percentage	FT%	Free-throw percentage
**Bold**	Career best	°	League leader

†	Denotes season(s) in which Newton won a WNBA championship

==== Regular season ====
WNBA regular season statistics
Year	Team	GP	GS	MPG	FG%	3P%	FT%	RPG	APG	SPG	BPG	TO	PPG
2005†	Sacramento	**34**	**34**	21.0	**40.3**	24.0	61.1	1.9	1.6	0.7	**0.3**	1.1	4.4
2006	Chicago	27	11	**24.0**	33.5	26.5	73.8	**2.6**	**2.1**	**1.3**	**0.3**	1.5	**6.5**
2007	Sacramento	**34**	**34**	20.5	37.6	**33.3**	**76.9**	1.8	1.4	0.9	0.2	1.2	6.4
2008	Sacramento	26	0	15.1	40.0	28.6	76.5	1.3	1.1	1.2	0.0	1.0	4.5
2009	Sacramento	23	0	14.6	37.1	**33.3**	66.7	1.3	1.7	0.8	0.1	**0.7**	3.0
**Career**	5 years, 2 teams	144	79	19.4	37.5	28.6	73.0	1.8	1.6	1.0	0.2	1.1	5.1

==== Playoffs ====
WNBA playoff statistics
Year	Team	GP	GS	MPG	FG%	3P%	FT%	RPG	APG	SPG	BPG	TO	PPG
2005†	Sacramento	**8**	**8**	**22.8**	42.9	50.0	66.7	1.8	1.0	0.3	0.0	1.4	**5.8**
2007	Sacramento	3	3	15.3	25.0	**100.0**	**100.0**	**2.3**	1.0	**1.7**	**0.3**	1.0	3.0
2008	Sacramento	3	0	14.7	**71.4**	**100.0**	**100.0**	0.7	1.0	0.7	0.0	**0.7**	4.3
**Career**	3 years, 1 team	14	11	19.4	42.6	66.7	75.0	1.6	1.0	0.6	0.1	1.1	4.9

=== College ===
NCAA statistics
Year	Team	GP	Points	FG%	3P%	FT%	RPG	APG	SPG	BPG	PPG
2001–02	Rutgers	21	136	38.8	28.6	**86.5**	**4.9**	1.2	1.2	0.1	6.5
2002–03	Rutgers	29	**313**	43.7	**42.9**	72.0	**4.9**	2.5	1.9	**0.4**	10.8
2003–04	Rutgers	21	230	**47.4**	11.8	67.6	2.9	**3.1**	1.6	–	**11.0**
2004–05	Rutgers	**33**	310	41.2	35.5	78.3	4.1	2.3	**2.1**	0.3	9.4
**Career**		104	989	43.0	33.7	74.9	4.3	2.3	1.8	0.2	9.5

== Notes ==
- WNBA.com: Chelsea Newton Playerfile
