= WNBA Most Improved Player =

Award

The Women's National Basketball Association's Most Improved Player Award is an annual Women's National Basketball Association (WNBA) award given since the 2000 WNBA season, to the most improved player of the regular season. The winner is selected by a panel of sportswriters throughout the United States, each of whom casts a vote for first, second, and third place selections. Each first-place vote is worth five points; each second-place vote is worth three points; and each third-place vote is worth one point. The player with the highest point total, regardless of the number of first-place votes, wins the award.

In 2019, Leilani Mitchell became the first player in history to win the award twice, after winning the award in 2010. In 2004, there was a tie—both Kelly Miller and Wendy Palmer received the award. Nicole Powell, Natasha Howard, and Jackie Young are the only players to win the Most Improved award and a WNBA title in the same year.

== Winners ==
	Denotes player who is still active in the WNBA
	Inducted into the Naismith Memorial Basketball Hall of Fame
	Inducted into the Women's Basketball Hall of Fame
	Denotes player whose team won championship that year
Player (X)	Denotes the number of times the player has won
Team (X)	Denotes the number of times a player from this team has won

Season	Player	Yrs (Note: Played in league (including season in which award was given to player))	Position	Nationality	Team	First-Place Votes	Ref.
2000	Tari Phillips	2	Forward / Center	United States	New York Liberty	19 out of 62	
2001	Janeth Arcain	5	Guard	Brazil	Houston Comets	25 out of 60	
2002	Coco Miller	2	Guard	United States	Washington Mystics	14 out of 60	
2003	Michelle Snow	2	Forward / Center	United States	Houston Comets (2)	22 out of 53	
2004	Kelly Miller	4	Guard	United States	Indiana Fever	9 out of 48 (tie)	
2004	Wendy Palmer	8	Forward	United States	Connecticut Sun	9 out of 48 (tie)	
2005	Nicole Powell	2	Forward	United States	Sacramento Monarchs	20 out of 49	
2006	Erin Buescher	5	Forward	United States	Sacramento Monarchs (2)	28 out of 56	
2007	Janel McCarville	3	Center	United States	New York Liberty (2)	33 out of 51	
2008	Ebony Hoffman	5	Forward	United States	Indiana Fever (2)	31 out of 44	
2009	Crystal Langhorne	2	Forward	United States	Washington Mystics (2)	19 out of 40	
2010	Leilani Mitchell	3	Guard	Australia (Note: Leilani Mitchell was born as a dual citizen of the United States and Australia. She represents Australia internationally.)	New York Liberty (3)	29 out of 39	
2011	Kia Vaughn	3	Center	United States (Note: Kia Vaughn was born in the United States and is a naturalized citizen of the Czech Republic. She has represented the Czech Republic internationally since 2017.)	New York Liberty (4)	15 out of 40	
2012	Kristi Toliver	4	Guard	United States (Note: Kristi Toliver was born in the United States and is a naturalized citizen of Slovakia. She has represented Slovakia internationally since 2014.)	Los Angeles Sparks	24 out of 41	
2013	Shavonte Zellous	5	Guard	United States (Note: Shavonte Zellous was born in the United States and is a naturalized citizen of Croatia. She has represented Croatia internationally since 2015.)	Indiana Fever (3)	30 out of 39	
2014	Skylar Diggins	2	Guard	United States	Tulsa Shock	29 out of 38	
2015	Kelsey Bone	3	Center	United States	Connecticut Sun (2)	14 out of 39	
2016	Elizabeth Williams	2	Forward / Center	United States (Note: Elizabeth Williams was born in the United Kingdom and is a naturalized citizen of the United States. She has represented the United States internationally since 2009.)	Atlanta Dream	14 out of 39	
2017	Jonquel Jones	2	Forward / Center	Bahamas (Note: Jonquel Jones was born in the Bahamas and is a naturalized citizen of Bosnia and Herzegovina. She has represented Bosnia and Herzegovina internationally since 2019.)	Connecticut Sun (3)	32 out of 40	
2018	Natasha Howard	5	Forward	United States	Seattle Storm	29 out of 39	
2019	Leilani Mitchell (2)	11	Guard	Australia	Phoenix Mercury	27 out of 43	
2020	Betnijah Laney	5	Forward / Guard	United States	Atlanta Dream (2)	25 out of 47	
2021	Brionna Jones	5	Forward	United States	Connecticut Sun (4)	38 out of 49	
2022	Jackie Young	4	Guard	United States	Las Vegas Aces	32 out of 56	
2023	Satou Sabally	4	Forward	Germany (Note: Satou Sabally was born in the United States to Gambian and German parents, and is a citizen by birth of all three countries. She represents Germany internationally.)	Dallas Wings (2)	37 out of 60	
2024	DiJonai Carrington	4	Guard	United States	Connecticut Sun (5)	28 out of 67	
2025	Veronica Burton	4	Guard	United States	Golden State Valkyries	68 out of 72	
2026	Jessica Shepard	6	Forward	United States (Note: Jessica Shepard was born in the United States and is a naturalized citizen of Slovenia. She has represented Slovenia internationally since 2024.)	Dallas Wings (3)	29 out of 74	

== Multi-time winners ==
Awards	Player	Team(s)	Years
2	Leilani Mitchell	New York Liberty (1) / Phoenix Mercury (1)	2010, 2019

== See also ==
- List of sports awards honoring women
