= 2009 Sacramento Monarchs season =

- Head coach: Jenny Boucek (3-10); John Whisenant (9-12)
- Arena: ARCO Arena

Results
- Record: 12–22 (.353)
- Place: 6th (Western)
- Playoff finish: Did not qualify

The 2009 WNBA season was the 13th season and final season for the Sacramento Monarchs of the Women's National Basketball Association. The Monarchs failed to qualify for the WNBA Playoffs for the first time in seven years. The Monarchs would later discontinue operations just 2 months after the 2009 season ended, making them the last defunct WNBA team to date.

== Offseason ==
=== Dispersal Draft ===
Based on the Monarchs' 2008 record, they would pick 7th in the Houston Comets dispersal draft. The Monarchs picked Ranae Camino.

=== WNBA draft ===
The following are the Monarchs' selections in the 2009 WNBA draft.

Round	Pick	Player	Nationality	School/Team/Country
1	7	Courtney Paris	United States	Oklahoma
2	20	Whitney Boddie	United States	Auburn
3	33	Morgan Warburton	United States	Utah

=== Transactions ===
- September 9: The Monarchs signed Chelsea Newton and waived Lisa Willis.
- August 28: The Monarchs signed Lisa Willis to a seven-day contract.
- August 17: The Monarchs acquired Kristin Haynie from the Detroit Shock in exchange for Crystal Kelly.
- August 7: The Monarchs signed Whitney Boddie to a seven-day contract and waived Chelsea Newton.
- June 5: The Monarchs waived Miao Lijie.
- June 4: The Monarchs waived Charel Allen, Whitney Boddie, and Morgan Warburton.
- May 25: The Monarchs waived Barbara Farris.
- March 20: The Monarchs traded A’Quonesia Franklin and Kim Smith to the Phoenix Mercury in exchange for Barbara Farris.
- February 10: The Monarchs signed Hamchétou Maïga-Ba.
- January 20: The Monarchs re-signed free agent Ticha Penicheiro.
- January 14: The Monarchs re-signed free agent DeMya Walker and signed Chelsea Newton and Miao Li Jie to training camp contracts.

Date	Trade	
March 20, 2009	To Sacramento Monarchs	To Phoenix Mercury
March 20, 2009	Barbara Farris	A’Quonesia Franklin and Kim Smith

=== Free agents ===
==== Additions ====
Player	Signed	Former team
Chelsea Newton	January 14, 2009	re-signed
DeMya Walker	January 14, 2009	re-signed
Ticha Penicheiro	January 20, 2009	re-signed
Hamchétou Maïga-Ba	February 10, 2009	Houston Comets
Kristin Haynie	August 17, 2009	Detroit Shock

==== Subtractions ====
Player	Left	New team
A’Quonesia Franklin	March 20, 2009	free agent
Kim Smith	March 20, 2009	free agent
Charel Allen	June 4, 2009	free agent
Morgan Warburton	June 4, 2009	free agent
Crystal Kelly	August 17, 2009	Detroit Shock
Adrian Williams-Strong	2009	free agent

== Roster ==
2009 Sacramento Monarchs roster
Players
Coaches

Pos.	No.	Nat.	Name	Height	Weight	From
F	32	(United States)	Brunson, Rebekkah	6' 3" (1.91m)	175 lb (79kg)	Georgetown
C	15	(United States)	Harper, Laura	6' 5" (1.96m)	190 lb (86kg)	Maryland
G	4	(United States)	Haynie, Kristin	5' 6" (1.68m)	147 lb (67kg)	Michigan State
G	20	(United States)	Lawson, Kara	5' 9" (1.75m)	165 lb (75kg)	Tennessee
G/F	9	(Mali)	Maïga-Ba, Hamchétou	6' 1" (1.85m)	160 lb (73kg)	Old Dominion
G	2	(United States)	Newton, Chelsea	5' 11" (1.8m)	154 lb (70kg)	Rutgers
C	3	(United States)	Paris, Courtney	6' 4" (1.93m)	240 lb (109kg)	Oklahoma
G	21	(Portugal)	Penicheiro, Ticha	5' 11" (1.8m)	145 lb (66kg)	Old Dominion
F	14	(United States)	Powell, Nicole	6' 2" (1.88m)	175 lb (79kg)	Stanford
G	5	(United States)	Robinson, Scholanda	5' 11" (1.8m)	165 lb (75kg)	LSU
F	22	(United States)	Walker, DeMya	6' 3" (1.91m)	168 lb (76kg)	Virginia

Head coach
(United States) John Whisenant (New Mexico State)
Assistant coaches
(United States) Tom Abatemarco (Dowling)
(United States) Monique Ambers (Arizona State)
Athletic trainer
(United States) Jill Jackson (Sacramento State)
Strength and conditioning coach
(United States) Jimmy Duba (Connecticut)

Legend

- (C) Team captain
- (DP) Unsigned draft pick
- (FA) Free agent
- (S) Suspended
- Injured

WNBA roster page

== Season standings ==
Western Conference	W	L	PCT	GB	Home	Road	Conf.
Phoenix Mercury ^{x}	23	11	.676	–	12–5	11–6	13–7
Seattle Storm ^{x}	20	14	.588	3.0	13–4	7–10	13–7
Los Angeles Sparks ^{x}	18	16	.529	5.0	11–6	7–10	11–9
San Antonio Silver Stars ^{x}	15	19	.441	8.0	10–7	5–12	10–10
Minnesota Lynx ^{o}	14	20	.412	9.0	9–8	5–12	7–13
Sacramento Monarchs ^{o}	12	22	.353	11.0	7–10	5–12	6–14

== Schedule ==
=== Preseason ===
2009 Game Log: Preseason

Game	Date	Time (ET)	Opponent	Score	High points	High rebounds	High assists	Location/Attendance	Record
1	May 21	10:00pm	@ Seattle	55-64	Powell (15)	Maiga-Ba, Paris, Harper (5)	6 players (1)	KeyArena; 4,875	0-1
2	May 27	2:00pm	Phoenix	74-70	Harper (11)	Harper (9)	Penicheiro (3)	ARCO Arena; 6,339	0-2

=== Regular season ===
2009 Game Log: Regular Season
June

Game	Date	Time (ET)	Opponent	TV	Score	High points	High rebounds	High assists	Location/Attendance	Record
1	June 6	4:00pm	Seattle		61-71	Harper, Penicheiro (11)	Harper (6)	Harper (3)	ARCO Arena; 14,824	0-1
2	June 7	9:00pm	@ Seattle	FSN-NW	70-80	Lawson (17)	Lawson, Powell (7)	Penicheiro, Newton (3)	KeyArena; 9,686	0-2
3	June 12	10:00pm	Phoenix		90-71	Powell (19)	Harper (8)	Lawson (4)	ARCO Arena; 6,438	1-2
4	June 13	10:00pm	@ Phoenix		104-115 (OT)	Powell (28)	Powell (9)	Lawson (8)	US Airways Center; 7,173	1-3
5	June 16	10:00pm	Minnesota		83-86	Powell (19)	Harper (9)	Lawson (4)	ARCO Arena; 7,736	1-4
6	June 21	10:30pm	@ Los Angeles	NBA TV; FSNW	47-67	Powell (13)	Walker (9)	Newton (3)	STAPLES Center; 9,494	1-5
7	June 26	8:00pm	@ San Antonio		52-62	Walker (12)	Walker (8)	Walker (3)	AT&T Center; 7,973	1-6
8	June 28	6:00pm	@ Detroit		72-86	Brunson (16)	Brunson (7)	Penicheiro (5)	Palace of Auburn Hills; 7,277	1-7
9	June 30	8:00pm	@ Chicago		72-74	Powell (21)	Powell (8)	Harper, Maiga-Ba, Newton, Penicheiro (2)	UIC Pavilion; 2,721	1-8

July

Game	Date	Time (ET)	Opponent	TV	Score	High points	High rebounds	High assists	Location/Attendance	Record
10	July 2	8:00pm	@ Minnesota	NBA TV; FSN-N	74-68	Powell (21)	Brunson (8)	Penicheiro (4)	Target Center; 6,920	2-8
11	July 7	10:00pm	Chicago		83-73	Lawson, Maiga-Ba (13)	Brunson (10)	Lawson, Penicheiro (6)	ARCO Arena; 5,672	3-8
12	July 9	9:00pm	@ Seattle	ESPN2	55-66	Brunson, Robinson (10)	Powell (8)	Penicheiro (3)	KeyArena; 6,838	3-9
13	July 11	10:00pm	Phoenix		105-107	Powell (23)	Brunson, Walker (8)	Lawson (5)	ARCO Arena; 7,798	3-10
14	July 15	3:30pm	@ Phoenix	NBA TV; FSNA	81-100	Powell (23)	Paris (9)	Penicheiro (6)	US Airways Center; 11,590	3-11
15	July 17	10:00pm	Seattle		56-69	Powell (13)	Powell (4)	Penicheiro (5)	ARCO Arena; 6,386	3-12
16	July 19	9:00pm	Detroit		65-69	Powell (12)	Paris (5)	Paris (3)	ARCO Arena; 7,538	3-13
17	July 22	7:00pm	@ Connecticut		75-83	Powell (18)	Harper (11)	Penicheiro (4)	Mohegan Sun Arena; 5,675	3-14
18	July 23	7:30pm	@ New York	MSG	88-73	Powell (32)	Powell, Walker (9)	Penicheiro (9)	Madison Square Garden; 8,845	4-14
19	July 26	4:00pm	@ Washington		73-87	Lawson (16)	Walker (6)	Penicheiro, Walker (4)	Verizon Center; 10,757	4-15
20	July 30	2:30pm	San Antonio		101-93 (OT)	Powell (21)	Powell (7)	Penicheiro (9)	ARCO Arena; 10,461	5-15

August

Game	Date	Time (ET)	Opponent	TV	Score	High points	High rebounds	High assists	Location/Attendance	Record
21	August 1	10:00pm	Los Angeles		56-59	Powell (18)	Paris, Penicheiro, Powell (5)	Penicheiro (8)	ARCO Arena; 7,204	5-16
22	August 7	10:00pm	New York		66-84	Paris (19)	Brunson (7)	Penicheiro (4)	ARCO Arena; 6,284	5-17
23	August 11	8:00pm	@ San Antonio		90-73	Brunson (19)	Brunson (9)	Penicheiro (11)	AT&T Center; 4,961	6-17
24	August 14	10:30pm	@ Los Angeles		85-79	Powell (19)	Powell (7)	Penicheiro (10)	STAPLES Center; 10,122	7-17
25	August 15	10:00pm	Los Angeles		61-78	Powell (20)	Brunson (11)	Lawson, Walker (5)	ARCO Arena; 7,646	7-18
26	August 20	10:00pm	Indiana		67-62	Brunson (16)	Brunson, Powell (10)	Penicheiro (6)	ARCO Arena; 6,290	8-18
27	August 22	10:00pm	Washington		82-60	Powell (26)	Powell (11)	Penicheiro (5)	ARCO Arena; 7,067	9-18
28	August 25	7:30pm	@ Atlanta		83-103	Brunson (15)	Brunson (7)	Penicheiro (11)	Philips Arena; 5,159	9-19
29	August 28	8:00pm	@ Minnesota		95-100	Maiga-Ba (20)	Brunson (9)	Powell (6)	Target Center; 8,782	9-20
30	August 29	7:00pm	@ Indiana		79-78	Powell (19)	Powell (11)	Powell (4)	Conseco Fieldhouse; 8,579	10-20

September

Game	Date	Time (ET)	Opponent	TV	Score	High points	High rebounds	High assists	Location/Attendance	Record
31	September 1	10:00pm	Connecticut		90-70	Brunson (32)	Brunson (13)	Powell (7)	ARCO Arena; 6,015	11-20
32	September 4	10:00pm	Atlanta		90-98	Powell (23)	Brunson (7)	Penicheiro (7)	ARCO Arena; 6,517	11-21
33	September 10	10:00pm	San Antonio		71-80	Powell (17)	Powell (10)	Penicheiro (5)	ARCO Arena; 7,566	11-22
34	September 13	9:00pm	Minnesota		88-68	Powell (27)	Paris (14)	Penicheiro (10)	ARCO Arena; 10,212	12-22

All games are viewable on WNBA LiveAccess

== Regular season statistics ==
Legend
GP	Games played	GS	Games started	MPG	Minutes per game	RPG	Rebounds per game
APG	Assists per game	SPG	Steals per game	BPG	Blocks per game	PPG	Points per game
FG%	Field-goal percentage	3P%	3-point field-goal percentage	FT%	Free-throw percentage	TO	Turnovers per game
PF	Fouls per game		Team leader		League leader

=== Player statistics ===
Player	GP	GS	MPG	RPG	APG	SPG	BPG	PPG
Whitney Boddie	0	0	00.0	0.0	0.0	0.00	0.00	0.0
Rebekkah Brunson	0	0	00.0	0.0	0.0	0.00	0.00	0.0
Laura Harper	0	0	00.0	0.0	0.0	0.00	0.00	0.0
Kristin Haynie	0	0	00.0	0.0	0.0	0.00	0.00	0.0
Crystal Kelly	0	0	00.0	0.0	0.0	0.00	0.00	0.0
Kara Lawson	0	0	00.0	0.0	0.0	0.00	0.00	0.0
Hamchétou Maïga-Ba	0	0	00.0	0.0	0.0	0.00	0.00	0.0
Chelsea Newton	0	0	00.0	0.0	0.0	0.00	0.00	0.0\
Courtney Paris	0	0	00.0	0.0	0.0	0.00	0.00	0.0
Ticha Penicheiro	0	0	00.0	0.0	0.0	0.00	0.00	0.0
Nicole Powell	0	0	00.0	0.0	0.0	0.00	0.00	0.0
Scholanda Robinson	0	0	00.0	0.0	0.0	0.00	0.00	0.0
DeMya Walker	0	0	00.0	0.0	0.0	0.00	0.00	0.0
Lisa Willis	0	0	00.0	0.0	0.0	0.00	0.00	0.0

=== Team statistics ===
Team	FG%	3P%	FT%	RPG	APG	SPG	BPG	TO	PF	PPG
Sacramento Monarchs	.000	.000	.000	00.0	00.0	0.0	0.0	00.0	00.0	00.0
Opponents	.000	.000	.000	00.0	00.0	0.0	0.0	00.0	00.0	00.0

== Awards and honors ==
- Nicole Powell was named to the 2009 WNBA All-Star Team as a Western Conference injury replacement for Lisa Leslie.
- Kara Lawson was awarded the Kim Perrot Sportsmanship Award.
