= Scholanda Dorrell =

American basketball player

Personal information
- Born: January 9, 1983 (age 43) Miami, Florida, U.S.
- Listed height: 5 ft 11 in (1.80 m)
- Listed weight: 162 lb (73 kg)

Career information
- High school: Miami Edison (Miami, Florida)
- College: LSU (2001–2006)
- WNBA draft: 2006: 1st round, 14th overall pick
- Drafted by: Sacramento Monarchs
- Position: Guard

Career history
- 2006–2009: Sacramento Monarchs
- 2010: Tulsa Shock
- 2011: San Antonio Silver Stars
- 2012: Tulsa Shock
- Stats at WNBA.com
- Stats at Basketball Reference

Scholanda Dorrell (born January 9, 1983) is an American professional women's basketball player in the WNBA, most recently with the Tulsa Shock. Dorrell was born in Miami, Florida and attended Miami Edison High School before attending Louisiana State University. She graduated in 2006 and was selected 14th overall in the 2006 WNBA draft by the Sacramento Monarchs.

== Career statistics ==
Legend
GP	Games played	GS	Games started	MPG	Minutes per game	RPG	Rebounds per game
APG	Assists per game	SPG	Steals per game	BPG	Blocks per game	PPG	Points per game
TO	Turnovers per game	FG%	Field-goal percentage	3P%	3-point field-goal percentage	FT%	Free-throw percentage
**Bold**	Career best	°	League leader

=== WNBA ===
==== Regular season ====
Year	Team	GP	GS	MPG	FG%	3P%	FT%	RPG	APG	SPG	BPG	TO	PPG
2006	Sacramento	33	21	15.1	37.2	29.4	**81.8**	1.1	0.5	0.9	0.1	1.2	5.2
2007	Sacramento	**34**	0	15.4	40.6	25.0	71.4	1.4	0.9	1.1	0.3	1.4	5.8
2008	Sacramento	29	3	18.4	40.5	**36.7**	69.6	1.1	0.8	1.1	0.2	2.3	6.8
2009	Sacramento	**34**	29	18.6	**40.9**	32.0	67.8	1.6	0.8	1.0	0.2	1.6	6.6
2010	Tulsa	**34**	**33**	**24.6**	40.2	30.3	70.8	2.4	**1.7**	**1.6**	**0.4**	2.5	**11.9**
2011	San Antonio	32	22	16.2	33.5	34.0	70.5	1.5	0.4	0.7	0.2	**0.6**	4.8
2012	Tulsa	26	8	14.8	32.7	32.0	66.7	1.2	0.5	1.0	0.1	1.0	4.2
Career	1 year, 3 teams	222	116	17.7	38.6	31.1	70.3	1.5	0.8	1.0	0.2	1.5	6.6

=== College ===
Legend
GP	Games played	GS	Games started	MPG	Minutes per game
FG%	Field goal percentage	3P%	3-point field goal percentage	FT%	Free throw percentage
RPG	Rebounds per game	APG	Assists per game	SPG	Steals per game
BPG	Blocks per game	PPG	Points per game	**Bold**	Career high

Year	Team	GP	Points	FG%	3P%	FT%	RPG	APG	SPG	BPG	PPG
2001–02	LSU	29	308	44.6%	23.1%	71.6%	**4.2**	1.7	1.6	0.4	**10.6**
2002–03	LSU	redshirt									
2003–04	LSU	35	298	**44.7%**	**41.0%**	67.1%	2.3	0.6	1.3	0.4	8.5
2004–05	LSU	**36**	**322**	38.1%	34.8%	68.9%	2.5	2.1	**2.2**	**0.9**	8.9
2005–06	LSU	35	301	41.0%	35.1%	**79.7%**	2.5	**2.2**	1.8	0.6	8.6
Career		135	1229	41.9%	34.7%	71.6%	2.8	1.6	1.7	0.6	9.1
