= Sacramento Monarchs =

- Conference: Western
- Leagues: WNBA
- Founded: 1997
- Dissolved: 2009
- History: Sacramento Monarchs; 1997–2009
- Arena: ARCO Arena
- Location: Sacramento, California
- Team colors: Purple, red, white, silver
- Championships: 1 (2005)
- Conference titles: 2 (2005, 2006)
- Website: team.wnba.com

The Sacramento Monarchs were a professional basketball team based in Sacramento, California. They played in the Women's National Basketball Association (WNBA) from 1997 until folding on November 20, 2009. They played their home games at ARCO Arena.

The Monarchs were one of the WNBA's eight original franchises and were noted early on for standout players Ticha Penicheiro, Ruthie Bolton and Yolanda Griffith. They were the sister franchise of the Sacramento Kings National Basketball Association (NBA) team. They were one of the more successful WNBA franchises on the court, though they often trailed behind perennial Western Conference champions the Houston Comets and the Los Angeles Sparks. However, in 2005, the team brought Sacramento its first championship, winning the WNBA Finals for the only time.

== History ==
=== Origins (1997–2003) ===
The Monarchs made an impact in the WNBA almost immediately. With the hiring of Portuguese national team player Ticha Penicheiro, popular player Ruthie Bolton and prolific scorer Yolanda Griffith, all of whom have been WNBA All-Stars, the Monarchs made the playoffs almost every year during this time, but were eliminated before reaching the WNBA Finals.

=== Championship window (2004–2006) ===
After losing to the Seattle Storm in the 2004 WNBA Western Conference Championship, the Monarchs made major roster moves to improve the team – obtaining younger players and emphasizing Head Coach John Whisenant's defense-oriented system. Bolton, one of the team's original players, became a free agent and the Monarchs made the difficult decision not to keep her on the active playing roster, though they did offer her a position in their front office. Edna Campbell, a breast cancer survivor and another fan favorite, was not signed by the Monarchs and later signed with the San Antonio Silver Stars.

On March 3, 2005, the Monarchs traded Tangela Smith and a 2006 second round draft pick to the Charlotte Sting in exchange for former Stanford University standout Nicole Powell, Olympia Scott-Richardson, and Erin Buescher. After signing two Chinese players, Miao Lijie and Sui Feifei, the Monarchs traded Chantelle Anderson to the San Antonio Silver Stars for a 2006 draft pick. During the 2005 WNBA draft, the Monarchs drafted point guard Kristin Haynie from Michigan State University and Chelsea Newton from Rutgers University. The Monarchs did sign Ruthie Bolton as a free agent for the purpose of her trying to win a spot on team's roster during its pre-season training camp, but eventually waived her. Bolton later joined the Monarchs to work in their promotions and public relations department.

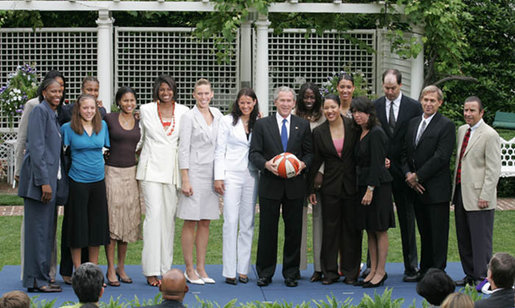
The Monarchs with U.S. President George W. Bush after winning the 2005 WNBA Finals

The offseason moves immediately paid off for the Monarchs as the team finished with a franchise-best 25–9 win–loss record. Whisenant was later named the WNBA Coach of the Year, and Powell received the WNBA Most Improved Player Award. After previous seasons of being eliminated from the WNBA Playoffs by either the Houston Comets or the Los Angeles Sparks, the Monarchs finally defeated both, sweeping both teams en route to their first appearance in the WNBA Finals. The Monarchs won their first ever WNBA Finals by defeating the Connecticut Sun, three games to one in a best-of-five playoff series, which brought the city of Sacramento its second major championship in a professional sport. After winning the championship, the Monarchs became the first women's professional team to appear on a Wheaties box.

The Monarchs remained strong in 2006, finishing second place in the West. The Monarchs would catch fire in the playoffs, once again sweeping both Houston and then top seeded LA to reach the Finals for the second straight season. But in the Finals, they were defeated by the Detroit Shock 3 games to 2, in the first WNBA Finals to go 5 games.

=== Decline (2007–2009) ===
In 2007, the Monarchs finished strongly again, but blew a chance to get the #2 seed at the end of the season. They were matched up against the San Antonio Silver Stars. After defeating the Silver Stars in game 1 at home, the Monarchs would lose games 2 & 3 (and the series) in San Antonio, ending their two-year run as Western Conference champions.

In 2008 the Monarchs were markedly less strong, but hung around the Western Playoff picture all season and finished with the #4 seed. Facing the Silver Stars again in the first round, the Monarchs were hoping for some payback for 2007. The series did not start well for the Monarchs, as they dropped Game 1 at home 85–78. Now the series shifted to San Antonio, and it seemed the series would come to a quick end. But the Monarchs would not back down, blowing out the Silver Stars in Game 2 84–67, forcing the critical Game 3. In Game 3, the Stars came out strong and at one point had a 14-point lead. But the Monarchs put together a furious rally, scoring seven points in the final 90 seconds of play to even the game and force it to overtime. But unfortunately for the Monarchs, the Silver Stars came out strong in the extra period and won the game, 86–81, ending the Monarchs' season.

In 2009, the Monarchs had one of their worst seasons in franchise history. It also led to the firing of head coach Jenny Boucek during the season, after which she was replaced by John Whisenant, the coach that led the Monarchs to their first championship in 2005. They finished 12–22, last in the conference and the league. They also missed the playoffs for the first time since the 2002 season and tied the record for the most losses with 22, the same number of losses they made 11 years ago.

=== Dissolution ===
It was revealed on November 20, 2009, that the Maloof family would no longer operate the Monarchs. The league attempted to re-locate the Monarchs to the San Francisco Bay Area or Oakland, but on December 8, 2009, it was announced that new ownership could not be found and a dispersal draft would be held on December 14, 2009. As of 2026, the Monarchs were the last WNBA team to cease operations.

== Season-by-season records ==
Season	Team	Conference		Regular season			Playoff Results	Head coach
Season	Team	Conference		W	L	PCT	Playoff Results	Head coach
Sacramento Monarchs
1997	1997	West	3rd	10	18	.357		M. Murphy (5–10); H. VanDerveer (5–8)
1998	1998	West	4th	8	22	.267		Heidi VanDerveer
1999	1999	West	3rd	19	13	.594	Lost Conference Semifinals (Los Angeles, 0–1)	Sonny Allen
2000	2000	West	3rd	21	11	.656	Lost Conference Semifinals (Houston, 0–2)	Sonny Allen
2001	2001	West	2nd	20	12	.625	Won Conference Semifinals (Utah, 2–0); Lost Conference Finals (Los Angeles, 1–2)	S. Allen (6-6); M. McHugh (14-6)
2002	2002	West	6th	14	18	.438		Maura McHugh
2003	2003	West	3rd	19	15	.559	Won Conference Semifinals (Houston, 2–1); Lost Conference Finals (Los Angeles, 1–2)	M. McHugh (7–11); J. Whisenant (12–4)
2004	2004	West	4th	18	16	.529	Won Conference Semifinals (Los Angeles, 2–1); Lost Conference Finals (Seattle, 1–2)	John Whisenant
2005	2005	West	1st	25	9	.735	Won Conference Semifinals (Los Angeles, 2–0); Won Conference Finals (Houston, 2–0); Won WNBA Finals (Connecticut, 3–1)	John Whisenant
2006	2006	West	2nd	21	13	.618	Won Conference Semifinals (Houston, 2–0); Won Conference Finals (Los Angeles, 2–0); Lost WNBA Finals (Detroit, 2–3)	John Whisenant
2007	2007	West	3rd	19	15	.559	Lost Conference Semifinals (San Antonio, 1–2)	Jenny Boucek
2008	2008	West	4th	18	16	.529	Lost Conference Semifinals (San Antonio, 1–2)	Jenny Boucek
2009	2009	West	6th	12	22	.353		J. Boucek (3–10); J. Whisenant (9–12)
Regular season				224	200	.528	2 Conference Championships	
Playoffs				24	19	.558	1 WNBA Championship	

== Players and coaches ==
=== Final roster ===
2009 Sacramento Monarchs roster
Players
Coaches

Pos.	No.	Nat.	Name	Height	Weight	From
C	32	(United States)	Brunson, Rebekkah	6' 3" (1.91m)	175 lb (79kg)	Georgetown
C	15	(United States)	Harper, Laura	6' 5" (1.96m)	190 lb (86kg)	Maryland
PG	4	(United States)	Haynie, Kristin	5' 6" (1.68m)	147 lb (67kg)	Michigan State
PG	20	(United States)	Lawson, Kara	5' 9" (1.75m)	165 lb (75kg)	Tennessee
PF	9	(Mali)	Maïga-Ba, Hamchétou	6' 1" (1.85m)	160 lb (73kg)	Old Dominion
SG	2	(United States)	Newton, Chelsea	5' 11" (1.8m)	154 lb (70kg)	Rutgers
C	3	(United States)	Paris, Courtney	6' 4" (1.93m)	240 lb (109kg)	Oklahoma
SG	21	(Portugal)	Penicheiro, Ticha	5' 11" (1.8m)	145 lb (66kg)	Old Dominion
PF	14	(United States)	Powell, Nicole	6' 2" (1.88m)	175 lb (79kg)	Stanford
SF	5	(United States)	Robinson, Scholanda	5' 11" (1.8m)	165 lb (75kg)	LSU
PF	22	(United States)	Walker, DeMya	6' 3" (1.91m)	168 lb (76kg)	Virginia

Head coach
(United States) John Whisenant (New Mexico State)
Assistant coaches
(United States) Tom Abatemarco (Dowling)
(United States) Monique Ambers (Arizona State)
Athletic trainer
(United States) Jill Jackson (Sacramento State)
Strength and conditioning coach
(United States) Jimmy Duba (Connecticut)

Legend

- (C) Team captain
- (DP) Unsigned draft pick
- (FA) Free agent
- (S) Suspended
- Injured

WNBA roster page

=== Head coaches ===
- Mary Murphy (1997)
- Heidi VanDerveer (1997–1998)
- Sonny Allen (1999–2001)
- Maura McHugh (2001–2003)
- John Whisenant (2003–2006, 2009)
- Jenny Boucek (2007–2009)

=== General managers ===
- Jerry Reynolds (1997-2003)
- John Whisenant (2003–09)

=== Hall of Famers ===
- Bridgette Gordon
- Ruthie Bolton
- Ticha Penicheiro
- Yolanda Griffith

=== Retired numbers ===
Sacramento Monarchs retired numbers
No.	Player	Position	Tenure
6	Ruthie Bolton	G	1997–2004
GM	Jerry Reynolds ^{1}	General Manager	1997–2003

^{1} The Monarchs' first General Manager, has a retired jersey marked "GM", that was hung onto the ARCO Arena's rafters in 2004.

=== Notable players ===
- Chantelle Anderson
- Cass Bauer-Bilodeau
- Cindy Blodgett
- Rebekkah Brunson
- Erin Buescher
- Latasha Byears
- Edna Campbell
- Bridgette Gordon
- Lady Grooms
- Yolanda Griffith
- Kristin Haynie
- Kedra Holland-Corn
- Kara Lawson
- Hamchetou Maiga-Ba
- Pamela McGee
- Courtney Paris
- Ticha Penicheiro
- Nicole Powell
- Scholanda Robinson
- Laure Savasta
- Olympia Scott-Richardson
- Tangela Smith
- Kate Starbird
- Katy Steding
- Chantel Tremitiere
- DeMya Walker
- Kara Wolters
- Adrian Williams-Strong

== All-Stars ==
- 1999: Ticha Penicheiro, Ruthie Bolton-Holifield, Yolanda Griffith
- 2000: Ticha Penicheiro, Yolanda Griffith
- 2001: Ticha Penicheiro, Ruthie Bolton-Holifield, Yolanda Griffith
- 2002: Ticha Penicheiro
- 2003: Yolanda Griffith
- 2004: None but Yolanda Griffith on USA Olympic Team
- 2005: Yolanda Griffith, DeMya Walker
- 2006: Yolanda Griffith
- 2007: Yolanda Griffith, Kara Lawson, Rebekkah Brunson
- 2008: No All-Star Game
- 2009: Nicole Powell

Sporting positions
Preceded by Seattle Storm	WNBA Champions; 2005 (First title)	Succeeded by Detroit Shock
Preceded by Seattle Storm	WNBA Western Conference Champions; 2005 (First title); 2006 (Second title)	Succeeded by Seattle Storm
