= Laura Harper (basketball) =

American basketball coach and former player

Towson Tigers
- Title: Head coach
- League: CAA

Personal information
- Born: April 11, 1986 (age 40) Philadelphia, Pennsylvania, U.S.
- Listed height: 6 ft 5 in (1.96 m)
- Listed weight: 186 lb (84 kg)

Career information
- High school: Cheltenham (Wyncote, Pennsylvania)
- College: Maryland (2004–2008)
- WNBA draft: 2008: 1st round, 10th overall pick
- Drafted by: Sacramento Monarchs
- Playing career: 2008–2013
- Position: Power forward / center
- Number: 15
- Coaching career: 2013–present

Career history

Playing
- 2008–2009: Sacramento Monarchs
- 2008: Beşiktaş
- 2009–2010: Umana Reyer Venezia
- 2011–2012: Antakya
- 2012–2013: Dynamo Moscow

Coaching
- 2013–2014: Loyola (Maryland) (assistant)
- 2014–2016: High Point (assistant)
- 2016–2017: George Washington (assistant)
- 2017–2019: Florida (assistant)
- 2019–2020: Montverde Academy
- 2020–2022: Coppin State
- 2022–present: Towson

Career highlights
- As player: NCAA champion (2006); NCAA Tournament MOP (2006); McDonald's All-American (2004); As coach: CAA regular season co-champion (2023)
- Stats at Basketball Reference
Medals
Women's basketball
FIBA Under-18 Americas Championship
Gold medal – first place	2004 Puerto Rico	Team

Laura Ashley Harper (born April 11, 1986) is an American basketball coach and former player who is the head women's basketball coach at Towson University. She played professionally with the Sacramento Monarchs of the Women's National Basketball Association.

== High school ==
Harper played for Cheltenham High School in Wyncote, Pennsylvania, where she was named a WBCA All-American. She participated in the 2004 WBCA High School All-America Game where she scored nine points.

== College ==
Laura Harper played college basketball at the University of Maryland and was part of the 2006 National Championship team. She tore her Achilles tendon during her freshman year, but battled back to become the Most Outstanding Player of the 2006 NCAA tournament.

=== College statistics ===
Legend
GP	Games played	GS	Games started	MPG	Minutes per game
FG%	Field goal percentage	3P%	3-point field goal percentage	FT%	Free throw percentage
RPG	Rebounds per game	APG	Assists per game	SPG	Steals per game
BPG	Blocks per game	PPG	Points per game	**Bold**	Career high

Year	Team	GP	Points	FG%	3P%	FT%	RPG	APG	SPG	BPG	PPG
2004–05	Maryland	9	119	57.0	-	58.3	**9.8**	1.3	0.9	1.7	13.2
2005–06	Maryland	36	**413**	53.5	-	68.3	7.2	0.7	0.9	**1.9**	11.5
2006–07	Maryland	34	353	55.1	-	**69.7**	6.3	1.1	0.8	**1.9**	10.4
2007–08	Maryland	**37**	522	**60.3**	**50.0**	68.9	8.5	**1.4**	**1.5**	1.3	**14.1**
Career	Maryland	116	1,407	56.5	50.0	68.2	7.5	1.1	1.0	1.7	12.1

== Professional playing career ==
Harper was selected in the first round of the 2008 WNBA draft, tenth overall, by the Sacramento Monarchs. As a rookie, she played 34 games and made one start. She averaged 5.5 points and 4.0 rebounds.

After the WNBA season ended, she signed with Beşiktaş of the Turkish Women's Basketball League. She averaged 18 points and 12 rebounds in 10 games played with Beşiktaş.

In 2009, Harper returned to the Monarchs and started 11 of 33 games played. She averaged 4.5 points and 3.4 rebounds. After the WNBA season, she signed with Umana Reyer Venezia of the Italian Serie A1. In 16 games with Venezia, she averaged 9.6 points and 7.6 rebounds.

Due to injuries, Harper sat out the 2010 and 2011 WNBA seasons. She returned to action later in 2011, again in Europe, with Antakya of the Turkish league, averaging 13.3 points and 9.9 rebounds.

Harper played her final season of professional basketball in 2012–13 with Dynamo Moscow of the Russian Women's Basketball Premier League. In 12 games, she averaged 7.3 points and 8.3 rebounds.

== WNBA career statistics ==
=== Regular season ===
Year	Team	GP	GS	MPG	FG%	3P%	FT%	RPG	APG	SPG	BPG	TO	PPG
2008	Sacramento	34	1	16.5	47.4	0.0	58.3	4.0	0.4	0.4	0.6	1.4	5.5
2009	Sacramento	33	11	13.9	38.8	0.0	73.2	3.4	0.6	0.4	0.7	1.3	4.5
Career	1 year, 3 teams	67	12	15.2	43.4	0.0	64.9	3.7	0.5	0.4	0.6	1.3	5.0

=== Playoffs ===
Year	Team	GP	GS	MPG	FG%	3P%	FT%	RPG	APG	SPG	BPG	TO	PPG
2008	Sacramento	3	0	14.0	37.5	0.0	50.0	3.0	0.7	0.7	0.3	3.3	3.0
Career	1 year, 1 team	67	12	15.2	43.4	0.0	64.9	3.7	0.5	0.4	0.6	1.3	5.0

== International career ==
Harper was a member of the USA Women's U18 team which won the gold medal at the FIBA Americas Championship in Mayaguez, Puerto Rico. The event was held in August 2004, when the USA team defeated Puerto Rico to win the championship. Harper started all five games and helped the team win the gold medal, scoring 12.8 points per game.

== Coaching career ==
In May 2013, Harper became an assistant coach at American University. She left American to become an assistant at Loyola University Maryland in September 2013.

Harper moved to North Carolina to become an assistant coach at High Point University in June 2014.

Following High Point, Harper served as an assistant coach for a season at George Washington University before coaching for two seasons at University of Florida. She left Florida after the 2018–19 season to become the head coach at Montverde Academy on June 29, 2019.

=== Coppin State ===
On July 20, 2020, Harper was announced as the new head women's basketball coach at Coppin State University.

=== Towson University ===
On April 20, 2022, Towson University announced Harper as the new head coach of their women's basketball team. Harper was placed on administrative leave on May 19, 2023 for undisclosed reasons. She returned from her suspension on November 29, missing the first four games of the season.

=== Head coaching record ===
Record table
Season	Team	Overall	Conference	Standing	Postseason
Coppin State Eagles (Mid-Eastern Athletic Conference) (2020–2022)
2020–21	Coppin State	2–13	2–10	T–3rd (North)	
2021–22	Coppin State	15–13	9–5	4th	
Coppin State:		17–26 (.395)	11–15 (.423)		
Towson Tigers (Colonial Athletic Association) (2022–present)
2022–23	Towson	21–12	13–5	T–1st	WNIT First Round
2023–24	Towson	20–11	11–7	6th	
2024–25	Towson	12–20	8–10	T–9th	
2025–26	Towson	17–14	10–8	T–6th	
Towson:		70–57 (.551)	42–30 (.583)		
Total:		87–83 (.512)			
National champion Postseason invitational champion Conference regular season champion Conference regular season and conference tournament champion Division regular season champion Division regular season and conference tournament champion Conference tournament champion

== Personal life ==
Harper's father Haviland Harper, Jr. played basketball at George Washington and is currently a high school basketball coach and math teacher. Haviland Harper's great-uncle, David "Big Dave" DeJernett, was a pioneering Afro-American basketball star at both pro and amateur levels in the Midwest.
