= A'Quonesia Franklin =

American basketball coach and player (born 1985)

Lamar Lady Cardinals
- Title: Head coach
- League: Southland

Personal information
- Born: September 29, 1985 (age 41) Tyler, Texas, U.S.
- Listed height: 5 ft 4 in (1.63 m)
- Listed weight: 154 lb (70 kg)

Career information
- High school: John Tyler (Tyler, Texas)
- College: Texas A&M (2004–2008)
- WNBA draft: 2008: 3rd round, 38th overall pick
- Drafted by: Sacramento Monarchs
- Playing career: 2008–2009
- Position: Guard
- Coaching career: 2009–present

Career history

Playing
- 2008: Sacramento Monarchs
- 2008: Solna Vikings
- 2009: Seattle Storm

Coaching
- 2009–2010: Texas A&M (assistant)
- 2010–2011: Stephen F. Austin (assistant)
- 2011–2012: Kansas (assistant)
- 2012–2015: Mississippi State (assistant)
- 2015–2019: Kansas (assistant)
- 2019–present: Lamar

Career highlights
- As player: First-team All-Big 12 (2007); As coach: Southland Coach of the Year (2024)
- Stats at WNBA.com
- Stats at Basketball Reference

A'Quonesia Krashun Franklin (born September 29, 1985), also known as Aqua, is an American basketball coach and former player. She played two seasons in the WNBA. She was a three-year captain of the Texas A&M team from the 2005–06 to 2007–08 seasons. She received All-America honorable mention honors from the Associated Press two times, and has also received all-Big 12 honors. In May 2019, she was named the head coach of the Lamar University women's basketball team.

== Playing career ==
=== Early life ===
Born and raised in Tyler, Texas, Franklin attended John Tyler High School, where she earned first team all-state, first team All-East Texas, and first team all-regional honors as a senior. She earned district MVP honors both her junior and senior year. She was also named the East Texas MVP her senior years. As a senior, her team won the district championship and reached the regional semifinals. She averaged 12 points and three assists as a junior, and averaged 14.5 points and six assists as a senior. She played in the Texas Girls Coaches Association Texas-Oklahoma All-Star game. During the summer after her senior year, she won an AAU championship with the Houston Elite team.

She chose to attend Texas A&M over Stephen F. Austin, West Virginia, and UTEP.

=== College ===
During her freshman season at Texas A&M, she was the only freshman in the Big 12 to start as a point guard. She was named Big 12 Rookie of the Week for three weeks.

She received All-Big 12 honorable mention her sophomore season.

In her junior season, she helped the Aggies win the Big 12 Conference regular season title, becoming a part of the first Texas A&M team to do so. She was named to the All-Big 12 First Team after the regular season. She was also named Big 12 Player of the Week for two weeks. Her team received a No. 4 bid to play in the 2007 NCAA basketball tournament. The team defeated Texas-Arlington in the first round but lost to George Washington in the second round. She received All-America honorable mention honors by the Associated Press after the tournament.

In her senior season, she made the All-Big 12 Second Team. The Aggies won the Big 12 Tournament, and received an automatic bid to play in the 2008 NCAA basketball tournament. She and her team were able to defeat 15th-seeded UTSA in the first round, Hartford in the second, and Duke in the Sweet Sixteen matchup. They advanced to the Elite Eight to play 7-time national champion Tennessee, and lost 53–45. After the tournament, Franklin received honorable mention All-America honors by the Associated Press.

She would finish her A&M career with 627 assists, ranking fourth all-time in A&M women's basketball history.

In 2018, she was named to the school's Athletic Hall of Fame.

=== Texas A&M statistics ===
Legend
GP	Games played	GS	Games started	MPG	Minutes per game
FG%	Field goal percentage	3P%	3-point field goal percentage	FT%	Free throw percentage
RPG	Rebounds per game	APG	Assists per game	SPG	Steals per game
BPG	Blocks per game	PPG	Points per game	**Bold**	Career high

Year	Team	GP	Points	FG%	3P%	FT%	RPG	APG	SPG	BPG	PPG
2004–05	Texas A&M	31	208	30.4	30.4	63.5	2.3	**5.0**	**1.7**	0.0	6.7
2005–06	Texas A&M	32	297	**39.0**	30.6	73.6	2.4	4.7	1.6	0.0	9.3
2006–07	Texas A&M	32	**316**	35.5	32.7	71.4	2.9	4.7	1.6	-	**9.9**
2007–08	Texas A&M	**37**	294	32.0	**37.0**	**76.0**	**2.9**	4.7	1.5	0.0	7.9
Career	Texas A&M	132	1115	34.4	33.1	71.8	2.6	4.8	1.6	0.0	8.4

=== Professional ===
Franklin was selected by the Sacramento Monarchs at No. 38 in the 2008 WNBA draft. In her rookie season, Franklin played in 34 games and averaged 1.6 points, 1.3 rebounds and 1.7 assists per game. Her team fell to San Antonio in the first round of the 2008 WNBA playoffs.

After the 2008 WNBA playoffs ended, Franklin signed with Basketligan dam club Solna Vikings in October 2008. In her debut, she posted 13 points and 3 rebounds in a victory against Luleå Basket. In 9 Basketligan games for the Vikings, she averaged 6.3 points and 2.8 assists. She also appeared in 8 games in the EuroCup, averaging 8.4 points and 4.0 assists.

On March 20, 2009, the Phoenix Mercury traded Barbara Farris to the Sacramento Monarchs for Franklin and Kim Smith. In May 2009, she signed with the Seattle Storm on a training camp contract. She was waived by the Storm on June 4 before signing again with the team on September 10.

==== WNBA career statistics ====
Legend
GP	Games played	GS	Games started	MPG	Minutes per game	RPG	Rebounds per game
APG	Assists per game	SPG	Steals per game	BPG	Blocks per game	PPG	Points per game
TO	Turnovers per game	FG%	Field-goal percentage	3P%	3-point field-goal percentage	FT%	Free-throw percentage
**Bold**	Career best	°	League leader

===== Regular season =====
Year	Team	GP	GS	MPG	FG%	3P%	FT%	RPG	APG	SPG	BPG	TO	PPG
2008	Sacramento	34	0	10.3	.271	.250	.643	1.3	1.7	0.5	0.0	0.8	1.6
2009	Seattle	2	0	10.0	.000	.000	.000	1.0	0.5	0.5	0.0	0.5	0.0
Career		36	0	10.3	.257	.231	.643	1.3	1.7	0.5	0.0	0.8	1.5

===== Postseason =====
Year	Team	GP	GS	MPG	FG%	3P%	FT%	RPG	APG	SPG	BPG	TO	PPG
2008	Sacramento	3	0	6.3	.167	.000	.000	0.3	0.3	0.3	0.0	0.7	0.7
Career		3	0	6.3	.167	.000	.000	0.3	0.3	0.3	0.0	0.7	0.7

== Coaching career ==
Franklin returned to Texas A&M to pursue her graduate education. She also served as a color analyst for the women's basketball team. She served as a graduate assistant for Aggies head coach Gary Blair. She became an assistant coach for Stephen F. Austin Women's Basketball Team in May 2010. After 1 year at SFA she joined Kansas Jayhawks. She became an assistant coach for the Kansas Jayhawks women's basketball team in May 2011. After one season with the Jayhawks, she joined the Mississippi State Lady Bulldog staff in 2012.

Following her year at Mississippi State where she helped the team to the most overall wins for a season in program history, she returned to Kansas as the associate head coach for Kansas. She served in this position for four years before being named the head coach at Lamar University in 2019.
