= WNBA Coach of the Year =

Sports award

The Women's National Basketball Association's Coach of the Year is an annual Women's National Basketball Association (WNBA) award given since the league's inaugural 1997 season. The winner is selected at the end of regular season by a panel of sportswriters from the United States, each of whom casts a vote for first, second, and third place selections. Each first-place vote is worth five points; each second-place vote is worth three points; and each third-place vote is worth one point. The person with the highest point total, regardless of the number of first-place votes, wins the award.

Seven coaches have won both this award and the WNBA Finals in the same season: Van Chancellor (1997–1999), Bill Laimbeer (2003), John Whisenant (2005), Brian Agler (2010), Cheryl Reeve (2011), Sandy Brondello (2014), and Becky Hammon (2022).

Cheryl Reeve has won the award the most times, with five selections.

== Winners ==
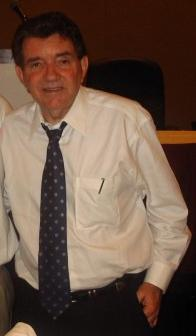
Van Chancellor won the first three Coach of the Year awards.

	Denotes coach who is still active in the WNBA
	Inducted into the Naismith Memorial Basketball Hall of Fame as a coach
	Inducted into the Women's Basketball Hall of Fame as a coach
	Denotes coach whose team won championship that year
Player (X)	Denotes the number of times the coach has won
Team (X)	Denotes the number of times a coach of this team has won

Season	Coach	Nationality	Team	Record
1997	Van Chancellor	United States	Houston Comets	18–10
1998	Van Chancellor (2)	United States	Houston Comets (2)	27–3
1999	Van Chancellor (3)	United States	Houston Comets (3)	26–6
2000	Michael Cooper	United States	Los Angeles Sparks	28–4
2001	Dan Hughes	United States	Cleveland Rockers	22–10
2002	Marianne Stanley	United States	Washington Mystics	17–15
2003	Bill Laimbeer	United States	Detroit Shock	25–9
2004	Suzie McConnell-Serio (Note: McConnell-Serio is a member of the Women's Hall of Fame, but as a player instead of a coach.)	United States	Minnesota Lynx	18–16
2005	John Whisenant	United States	Sacramento Monarchs	25–9
2006	Mike Thibault	United States	Connecticut Sun	26–8
2007	Dan Hughes (2)	United States	San Antonio Silver Stars	20–14
2008	Mike Thibault (2)	United States	Connecticut Sun (2)	21–13
2009	Marynell Meadors	United States	Atlanta Dream	18–16
2010	Brian Agler	United States	Seattle Storm	28–6
2011	Cheryl Reeve	United States	Minnesota Lynx (2)	27–7
2012	Carol Ross	United States	Los Angeles Sparks (2)	24–10
2013	Mike Thibault (3)	United States	Washington Mystics (2)	17–17
2014	Sandy Brondello	Australia	Phoenix Mercury	29–5
2015	Bill Laimbeer (2)	United States	New York Liberty	23–11
2016	Cheryl Reeve (2)	United States	Minnesota Lynx (3)	28–6
2017	Curt Miller	United States	Connecticut Sun (3)	21–13
2018	Nicki Collen	United States	Atlanta Dream (2)	23–11
2019	James Wade	United States/France	Chicago Sky	20–14
2020	Cheryl Reeve (3)	United States	Minnesota Lynx (4)	14–8
2021	Curt Miller (2)	United States	Connecticut Sun (4)	26–6
2022	Becky Hammon	United States/Russia	Las Vegas Aces (2) (Note: The San Antonio Silver Stars and Las Vegas Aces are the same franchise. The franchise was a founding league member as the Utah Starzz, and moved to San Antonio after the 2002 season. The word "Silver" was dropped in 2014, and the team moved to Las Vegas after the 2017 season.)	26–10
2023	Stephanie White	United States	Connecticut Sun (5)	27–13
2024	Cheryl Reeve (4)	United States	Minnesota Lynx (5)	30–10
2025	Natalie Nakase	United States	Golden State Valkyries	23–21
2026	Cheryl Reeve (5)	United States	Minnesota Lynx (6)	33-11

== Multi-time winners ==
Awards	Coach	Team(s)	Years
5	Cheryl Reeve	Minnesota Lynx	2011, 2016, 2020, 2024, 2026
3	Mike Thibault	Connecticut Sun (2) / Washington Mystics (1)	2006, 2008, 2013
3	Van Chancellor	Houston Comets	1997, 1998, 1999
2	Bill Laimbeer	Detroit Shock (1) / New York Liberty	2003, 2015
2	Curt Miller	Connecticut Sun	2017, 2021
2	Dan Hughes	Cleveland Rockers (1) / San Antonio Silver Stars (1)	2010, 2007

== See also ==
- List of sports awards honoring women
