= 2005 Sacramento Monarchs season =

- WNBA champions
- Head coach: John Whisenant
- Arena: ARCO Arena

Results
- Record: 25–9 (.735)
- Place: 1st (Western)
- Playoff finish: Won WNBA Finals

The 2005 WNBA season was the Monarch’s ninth season. The Monarchs finished the season by winning their first WNBA Championship.

== Offseason ==
=== WNBA draft ===
Round	Pick	Player	Position	Nationality	College
1	9	Kristin Haynie	Guard	United States	Michigan State
2	22	Chelsea Newton	Guard	United States	Rutgers
3	30	Anne O'Neil	Guard	United States	Iowa State
3	35	Cisti Greenwalt	Center	United States	Texas Tech

== Regular season ==
=== Season standings ===
Western Conference	W	L	PCT	GB	Home	Road	Conf.
Sacramento Monarchs ^{x}	25	9	.735	–	15–2	10–7	17–5
Seattle Storm ^{x}	20	14	.588	5.0	14–3	6–11	13–9
Houston Comets ^{x}	19	15	.559	6.0	11–6	8–9	11–11
Los Angeles Sparks ^{x}	17	17	.500	8.0	11–6	6–11	12–10
Phoenix Mercury ^{o}	16	18	.471	9.0	11–6	5–12	12–10
Minnesota Lynx ^{o}	14	20	.412	11.0	11–6	3–14	9–13
San Antonio Silver Stars ^{o}	7	27	.206	18.0	5–12	2–15	3–19

=== Season schedule ===
Date	Opponent	Score	Result	Record
May 21	@ Phoenix	77-72	Win	1-0
May 27	@ San Antonio	71-67	Win	2-0
May 29	@ Minnesota	67-66	Win	3-0
June 1	@ Indiana	60-61	Loss	3-1
June 4	Los Angeles	81-53	Win	4-1
June 7	Indiana	65-51	Win	5-1
June 10	Phoenix	73-61	Win	6-1
June 11	@ Los Angeles	74-81	Loss	6-2
June 13	Houston	74-68	Win	7-2
June 17	Minnesota	67-50	Win	8-2
June 24	Connecticut	50-61	Loss	8-3
June 26	@ Washington	62-57	Win	9-3
June 28	@ Connecticut	66-70	Loss	9-4
June 30	@ New York	61-50	Win	10-4
July 1	@ Detroit	80-63	Win	11-4
July 3	@ Seattle	67-74	Loss	11-5
July 14	San Antonio	72-61	Win	12-5
July 16	Washington	73-59	Win	13-5
July 19	@ Houston	54-58	Loss	13-6
July 22	New York	63-73	Loss	13-7
July 24	Detroit	91-51	Win	14-7
July 26	Charlotte	64-54	Win	15-7
July 29	Los Angeles	79-59	Win	16-7
July 31	Minnesota	67-54	Win	17-7
August 2	@ San Antonio	67-57	Win	18-7
August 4	@ Charlotte	76-58	Win	19-7
August 7	Houston	55-45	Win	20-7
August 12	@ Phoenix	62-76	Loss	20-8
August 16	@ Los Angeles	72-63	Win	21-8
August 18	San Antonio	64-57	Win	22-8
August 20	Seattle	75-65	Win	23-8
August 23	Phoenix	76-70	Win	24-8
August 25	@ Seattle	63-76	Loss	24-9
August 27	@ Minnesota	61-52	Win	25-9
August 31; First Round, G1	@ Los Angeles	75-72	Win	1-0
September 2 First Round, G2	Los Angeles	81-63	Win	2-0
September 8 Conference Finals, G1	@ Houston	73-69 (OT)	Win	3-0
September 10; Conference Finals, G2	Houston	74-65	Win	4-0
September 14; WNBA Finals, G1	@ Connecticut	69-65	Win	5-0
September 15; WNBA Finals, G2	@ Connecticut	70-77 (OT)	Loss	5-1
September 18; WNBA Finals, G3	Connecticut	66-55	Win	6-1
September 20; WNBA Finals, G4	Connecticut	62-59	Win	7-1

== Player stats ==
Note: GP = Games played; REB = Rebounds; AST = Assists; STL = Steals; BLK = Blocks; PTS = Points

Player	GP	REB	AST	STL	BLK	PTS
Yolanda Griffith	34	223	52	42	31	469
Nicole Powell	34	124	62	39	16	364
DeMya Walker	22	117	48	28	13	311
Rebekkah Brunson	34	187	16	28	15	265
Ticha Penicheiro	34	97	149	48	6	195
Kara Lawson	24	33	37	13	3	192
Chelsea Newton	34	66	55	24	9	148
Hamchetou Maiga-Ba	34	67	30	24	6	129
Kristin Haynie	30	62	43	33	1	104
Erin Buescher	23	29	14	16	5	76
Olympia Scott	18	33	5	4	2	38
Miao Miao	18	4	13	5	1	31
Sui Feifei	5	1	3	0	0	7

== Playoffs ==
Round	Winner	Loser
Western Conference Semi-Finals Round	Sacramento 2	Los Angeles 0
Western Conference Finals	Sacramento 2	Houston 0
WNBA Finals	Sacramento 3	Connecticut 1

== Awards and honors ==
- Yolanda Griffith, WNBA Finals MVP Award
- Nicole Powell, WNBA Most Improved Player Award
- John Whisenant, WNBA Coach of the Year Award
