= John Whisenant =

American basketball coach (born 1945)

Personal information
- Born: June 18, 1945 (age 81) Gore, Oklahoma, U.S.

Career information
- College: Connors JC (1961–1963); New Mexico State (1963–1965)
- Coaching career: 1966–2012

Career history

Coaching
- 1966–1968: Coffeyville CC (asst.)
- 1968–1972: Arizona Western JC
- 1972–1979: New Mexico (asst.)
- 1999–2001: New Mexico Slam
- 2003–2006, 2009: Sacramento Monarchs
- 2011–2012: New York Liberty

Career highlights
- WNBA champion (2005); WNBA Coach of the Year (2005)

John Harold Whisenant Jr. (born June 18, 1945) is an American former head coach for the Sacramento Monarchs and New York Liberty in the Women's National Basketball Association (WNBA).

== Coaching career ==
After starting at Connors Junior College in Warner, Oklahoma, Whisenant transferred to New Mexico State University in 1963 and played two seasons, including a senior season leading the team at 13.1 points per game.

Whisenant began his coaching career as an assistant coach at Coffeyville Community College in 1966; Coffeyville went 48–10 in his two years on staff. From 1968 to 1972, Whisenant was head coach at Arizona Western Junior College and led the school to three league championships and a cumulative 97–30 record.

From 1972 to 1979, Whisenant was an assistant coach at New Mexico under Norm Ellenberger and helped New Mexico accumulate a record of 137–62 and two WAC championships.

Whisenant began a business career focusing on real estate and horse racing after leaving the New Mexico coaching staff. He also coached his son's AAU team in Albuquerque and had a cumulative 176–16 record.

From 1999 to 2001, Whisenant was head coach and vice president of basketball operations for the New Mexico Slam of the International Basketball League. The Slam went 51–35 in its two seasons of existence, including 38–26 in 1999–2000.

After his stint with the Monarchs, Whisenant was coach and GM for the New York Liberty. On October 25, 2012, the Liberty announced that Whisenant would be leaving the team.

Outside of coaching, Whisenant is a partner in a commercial real estate firm in Albuquerque, New Mexico.

== Head coaching record ==
Team	Year	G	W	L	W–L%	Finish	PG	PW	PL	PW–L%	Result
Sacramento	2003	16	12	4	.750	3rd in Western	6	3	3	.500	Lost Conference finals
Sacramento	2004	34	18	16	.529	4th in Western	6	3	3	.500	Lost Conference finals
Sacramento	2005	34	25	9	.735	1st in Western	8	7	1	.875	Won WNBA Championship
Sacramento	2006	34	21	13	.618	2nd in Western	9	6	3	.667	Lost WNBA Finals
Sacramento	2009	21	9	12	.429	6th in Western	—	—	—	—	Missed playoffs
New York	2011	34	19	15	.559	4th in Eastern	3	1	2	.333	Lost Conference semifinals
New York	2012	34	15	19	.441	4th in Eastern	2	0	2	.000	Lost Conference semifinals
Career		207	119	88	.575		16	12	4	.750	
