= 2006 Sacramento Monarchs season =

- Head coach: John Whisenant
- Arena: ARCO Arena

Results
- Record: 21–13 (.618)
- Place: 2nd (Western)
- Playoff finish: Lost WNBA Finals (3-2) to Detroit Shock

The 2006 WNBA season was the 10th season for the Sacramento Monarchs. The Monarchs reached their second trip to the WNBA Finals, but was defeated in five games to the Detroit Shock. It was the final season in franchise history that Sacramento qualified for the WNBA Finals.

== Offseason ==
Chelsea Newton was picked up by the Chicago Sky in the 2006 WNBA Expansion Draft.

=== WNBA draft ===
| Round | Pick | Player | Nationality | College/School/Team |
|---|---|---|---|---|
| 1 | 13 | Kim Smith (F) | Canada | Utah |
| 1 | 14 | Scholanda Dorrell (G) | United States | LSU |
| 3 | 41 | Lamisha Augustine (F) | United States | San Jose State |

== Regular season ==
=== Season standings ===
| Western Conference | W | L | PCT | GB | Home | Road | Conf. |
|---|---|---|---|---|---|---|---|
| Los Angeles Sparks ^{x} | 25 | 9 | .735 | – | 15–2 | 10–7 | 15–5 |
| Sacramento Monarchs ^{x} | 21 | 13 | .618 | 4.0 | 14–3 | 7–10 | 10–10 |
| Houston Comets ^{x} | 18 | 16 | .529 | 7.0 | 12–5 | 6–11 | 11–9 |
| Seattle Storm ^{x} | 18 | 16 | .529 | 7.0 | 9–8 | 9–8 | 10–10 |
| Phoenix Mercury ^{o} | 18 | 16 | .529 | 7.0 | 10–7 | 8–9 | 8–12 |
| San Antonio Silver Stars ^{o} | 13 | 21 | .382 | 12.0 | 6–11 | 7–10 | 10–10 |
| Minnesota Lynx ^{o} | 10 | 24 | .294 | 15.0 | 8–9 | 2–15 | 6–14 |

=== Season schedule ===
| Date | Opponent | Score | Result | Record |
|---|---|---|---|---|
| May 20 | Phoenix | 105-78 | Win | 1-0 |
| May 23 | @ Chicago | 76-63 | Win | 2-0 |
| May 25 | Houston | 66-81 | Loss | 2-1 |
| May 31 | Seattle | 87-66 | Win | 3-1 |
| June 2 | San Antonio | 71-74 | Loss | 3-2 |
| June 6 | @ Phoenix | 76-90 | Loss | 3-3 |
| June 10 | Chicago | 80-70 | Win | 4-3 |
| June 14 | @ Houston | 66-73 (OT) | Loss | 4-4 |
| June 17 | Seattle | 76-74 | Win | 5-4 |
| June 18 | @ Los Angeles | 69-80 | Loss | 5-5 |
| June 21 | San Antonio | 75-69 | Win | 6-5 |
| June 23 | Los Angeles | 63-77 | Loss | 6-6 |
| June 25 | Indiana | 82-61 | Win | 7-6 |
| June 27 | @ Seattle | 53-68 | Loss | 7-7 |
| June 29 | Minnesota | 87-78 | Win | 8-7 |
| July 1 | @ Charlotte | 65-57 | Win | 9-7 |
| July 2 | @ Houston | 62-77 | Loss | 9-8 |
| July 6 | @ New York | 79-58 | Win | 10-8 |
| July 7 | @ Washington | 73-60 | Win | 11-8 |
| July 9 | Charlotte | 70-61 | Win | 12-8 |
| July 15 | Connecticut | 69-63 | Win | 13-8 |
| July 18 | @ Seattle | 74-61 | Win | 14-8 |
| July 20 | New York | 71-62 | Win | 15-8 |
| July 22 | @ Minnesota | 86-59 | Win | 16-8 |
| July 25 | @ Indiana | 60-75 | Loss | 16-9 |
| July 26 | @ Detroit | 71-91 | Loss | 16-10 |
| July 28 | @ Connecticut | 68-75 | Loss | 16-11 |
| July 30 | Detroit | 94-61 | Win | 17-11 |
| August 1 | Houston | 74-62 | Win | 18-11 |
| August 3 | @ San Antonio | 87-69 | Win | 19-11 |
| August 5 | Washington | 99-95 (2OT) | Win | 20-11 |
| August 9 | @ Los Angeles | 58-69 | Loss | 20-12 |
| August 10 | Minnesota | 74-66 | Win | 21-12 |
| August 13 | @ Phoenix | 71-81 | Loss | 21-13 |
| August 17; 1st Round, G1 | @ Houston | 93-78 | Win | 1-0 |
| August 19; 1st Round, G2 | Houston | 92-64 | Win | 2-0 |
| August 24; West Finals, G1 | Los Angeles | 64-61 | Win | 3-0 |
| August 26; West Finals, G2 | @ Los Angeles | 72-58 | Win | 4-0 |
| August 30; WNBA Finals, G1 | @ Detroit | 95-71 | Win | 5-0 |
| September 1 WNBA Finals, G2 | @ Detroit | 63-73 | Loss | 5-1 |
| September 3 WNBA Finals, G3 | Detroit | 89-69 | Win | 6-1 |
| September 6 WNBA Finals, G4 | Detroit | 52-72 | Loss | 6-2 |
| September 9 WNBA Finals, G5 | @ Detroit | 75-80 | Loss | 6-3 |

== Player stats ==
| Player | GP | REB | AST | STL | BLK | PTS |
|---|---|---|---|---|---|---|
| Yolanda Griffith | 34 | 219 | 56 | 44 | 16 | 407 |
| Erin Buescher | 34 | 134 | 35 | 33 | 14 | 330 |
| Nicole Powell | 34 | 131 | 61 | 42 | 15 | 327 |
| Kara Lawson | 34 | 65 | 56 | 20 | 4 | 277 |
| Rebekkah Brunson | 34 | 191 | 17 | 21 | 15 | 232 |
| DeMya Walker | 23 | 92 | 32 | 15 | 7 | 213 |
| Ticha Penicheiro | 34 | 91 | 116 | 58 | 2 | 183 |
| Hamchetou Maiga-Ba | 34 | 73 | 30 | 32 | 9 | 177 |
| Scholanda Robinson | 33 | 36 | 27 | 19 | 4 | 171 |
| Kristin Haynie | 34 | 67 | 68 | 27 | 2 | 140 |
| Kim Smith | 31 | 39 | 20 | 9 | 0 | 74 |
| Brittany Wilkins | 4 | 0 | 1 | 0 | 0 | 6 |
