= 2007 Sacramento Monarchs season =

- Head coach: Jenny Boucek
- Arena: ARCO Arena

Results
- Record: 19–15 (.559)
- Place: 3rd (Western)
- Playoff finish: Lost First Round (2-1) to San Antonio Silver Stars

The 2007 WNBA season was the 11th for the Sacramento Monarchs. The Monarchs qualified for the playoffs, but later fell to the San Antonio Silver Stars in three games.

== Offseason ==
=== Dispersal Draft ===
Based on the Monarchs' 2006 record, they would pick 10th in the Charlotte Sting dispersal draft. The Monarchs picked LaToya Bond.

=== WNBA draft ===
Round	Pick	Player	Nationality	School/Club team
2	23	Brooke Smith	United States	Stanford
3	36	Meg Bulger	United States	West Virginia

== Regular season ==
=== Season standings ===
Western Conference	W	L	PCT	GB	Home	Road	Conf.
Phoenix Mercury ^{x}	23	11	.676	–	12–5	11–6	17–5
San Antonio Silver Stars ^{x}	20	14	.588	3.0	9–8	11–6	13–9
Sacramento Monarchs ^{x}	19	15	.559	4.0	12–5	7–10	12–10
Seattle Storm ^{x}	17	17	.500	6.0	12–5	5–12	11–11
Houston Comets ^{o}	13	21	.382	10.0	7–10	6–11	10–12
Minnesota Lynx ^{o}	10	24	.294	13.0	7–10	3–14	8–14
Los Angeles Sparks ^{o}	10	24	.294	13.0	5–12	5–12	6–16

=== Season schedule ===
Date	Opponent	Score	Result	Record
May 19	@ Detroit	68-75	Loss	0-1
May 20	@ Minnesota	74-64	Win	1-1
May 22	@ Washington	70-52	Win	2-1
May 29	@ Phoenix	75-76	Loss	2-2
June 2	Los Angeles	88-85	Win	3-2
June 5	San Antonio	74-57	Win	4-2
June 7	Seattle	81-72	Win	5-2
June 9	Phoenix	70-74	Loss	5-3
June 11	@ Houston	82-67	Win	6-3
June 16	Houston	75-63	Win	7-3
June 19	@ Chicago	54-52	Win	8-3
June 22	@ Los Angeles	88-96 (OT)	Loss	8-4
June 23	Detroit	85-75	Win	9-4
June 26	New York	59-46	Win	10-4
June 27	@ Los Angeles	66-74	Loss	10-5
June 29	Chicago	84-92 (OT)	Loss	10-6
July 1	Minnesota	76-68	Win	11-6
July 6	@ Minnesota	85-80	Win	12-6
July 8	@ New York	61-71	Loss	12-7
July 12	Connecticut	78-82 (OT)	Loss	12-8
July 20	@ San Antonio	71-81	Loss	12-9
July 24	Los Angeles	67-59	Win	13-9
July 26	Indiana	60-50	Win	14-9
July 29	Minnesota	73-78	Loss	14-10
July 31	@ Seattle	78-74	Win	15-10
August 3	Seattle	82-76	Win	16-10
August 5	@ Indiana	55-63	Loss	16-11
August 7	@ Connecticut	81-79	Win	17-11
August 9	@ San Antonio	61-72	Loss	17-12
August 10	@ Houston	75-83	Loss	17-13
August 12	Washington	86-82 (OT)	Win	18-13
August 15	San Antonio	81-74	Win	19-13
August 17	Phoenix	91-101	Loss	19-14
August 19	@ Phoenix	73-87	Loss	19-15

== Playoffs ==
Game	Date	Opponent	Score	Result	Record
Western Conference Semifinals
1	August 23	San Antonio	86-65	Win	1-0
2	August 25	@ San Antonio	61-86	Loss	1-1
3	August 27	@ San Antonio	78-80	Loss	1-2

== Player stats ==
Player	GP	REB	AST	STL	BLK	PTS
Nicole Powell	34	191	58	48	12	436
Rebekkah Brunson	33	295	24	44	31	378
Kara Lawson	34	80	67	29	8	375
Yolanda Griffith	32	147	47	33	12	289
Chelsea Newton	34	62	46	31	6	219
Adrian Williams	34	152	28	22	6	211
Scholanda Robinson	34	48	30	37	10	196
Ticha Penicheiro	32	83	144	49	1	181
Kristin Haynie	34	37	70	18	6	126
La'Tangela Atkinson	28	44	15	10	5	58
DeMya Walker	5	25	6	3	3	44
Linda Frohlich	10	9	2	1	1	14
Kim Smith	3	2	0	0	0	0
