= 2005 WNBA season =

- League: Women's National Basketball Association
- Sport: Basketball
- Duration: May 21 – September 20, 2005
- Games: 34
- Teams: 13
- Total attendance: 1,805,937
- Average attendance: 8,172
- TV partner(s): ABC, ESPN

Draft
- Top draft pick: (United States) Janel McCarville
- Picked by: Charlotte Sting

Regular season
- Top seed: Connecticut Sun
- Season MVP: (United States) Sheryl Swoopes (Houston)
- Top scorer: (United States) Sheryl Swoopes (Houston)

Playoffs
- Finals champions: Sacramento Monarchs
- Runners-up: Connecticut Sun
- Finals MVP: (United States) Yolanda Griffith (Sacramento)

WNBA seasons
- ← 2004 2006 →

The 2005 WNBA season was the Women's National Basketball Association's ninth season. The season ended with the Sacramento Monarchs winning their first WNBA Championship.

== Regular season ==
=== Standings ===
Eastern Conference

Eastern Conference	W	L	PCT	GB	Home	Road	Conf.
Connecticut Sun ^{x}	26	8	.765	–	14–3	12–5	13–7
Indiana Fever ^{x}	21	13	.618	5.0	14–3	7–10	14–6
New York Liberty ^{x}	18	16	.529	8.0	10–7	8–9	9–11
Detroit Shock ^{x}	16	18	.471	10.0	12–5	4–13	11–9
Washington Mystics ^{o}	16	18	.471	10.0	10–7	6–11	9–11
Charlotte Sting ^{o}	6	28	.176	20.0	5–12	1–16	4–16

Western Conference

Western Conference	W	L	PCT	GB	Home	Road	Conf.
Sacramento Monarchs ^{x}	25	9	.735	–	15–2	10–7	17–5
Seattle Storm ^{x}	20	14	.588	5.0	14–3	6–11	13–9
Houston Comets ^{x}	19	15	.559	6.0	11–6	8–9	11–11
Los Angeles Sparks ^{x}	17	17	.500	8.0	11–6	6–11	12–10
Phoenix Mercury ^{o}	16	18	.471	9.0	11–6	5–12	12–10
Minnesota Lynx ^{o}	14	20	.412	11.0	11–6	3–14	9–13
San Antonio Silver Stars ^{o}	7	27	.206	18.0	5–12	2–15	3–19

== Playoffs ==
**Conference semifinals** Best-of-3
E1	**Connecticut**	2
E4	Detroit	0
**Eastern Conference**
E2	**Indiana**	2
E3	New York	0
W1	**Sacramento**	2
W4	Los Angeles	0
**Western Conference**
W2	Seattle	1
W3	**Houston**	2

**Conference finals** Best-of-3
E1	**Connecticut**	2
E2	Indiana	0
W1	**Sacramento**	2
W3	Houston	0

**WNBA Finals**; Best-of-5
E1	Connecticut	1
W1	**Sacramento**	3

- **Bold** – Series winner
- Italic – Team with home-court advantage

== Awards ==
=== Individual ===
Award		Winner	Team
Most Valuable Player (MVP)		Sheryl Swoopes	Houston Comets
Finals MVP		Yolanda Griffith	Sacramento Monarchs
Defensive Player of the Year		Tamika Catchings	Indiana Fever
Most Improved Player		Nicole Powell	Sacramento Monarchs
Peak Performers	**Scoring**	Sheryl Swoopes	Houston Comets
Peak Performers	**Rebounding**	Cheryl Ford	Detroit Shock
Peak Performers	**Dish and Assist**	Sue Bird	Seattle Storm
Rookie of the Year		Temeka Johnson	Washington Mystics
Kim Perrot Sportsmanship Award		Taj McWilliams-Franklin	Connecticut Sun
Coach of the Year		John Whisenant	Sacramento Monarchs

=== Team ===
Award		Player	Team
All-WNBA	First Team	Lauren Jackson	Seattle Storm
All-WNBA	First Team	Sheryl Swoopes	Houston Comets
All-WNBA	First Team	Yolanda Griffith	Sacramento Monarchs
All-WNBA	First Team	Deanna Nolan	Detroit Shock
All-WNBA	First Team	Sue Bird	Seattle Storm
All-WNBA	Second Team	Tamika Catchings	Indiana Fever
All-WNBA	Second Team	Taj McWilliams-Franklin	Connecticut Sun
All-WNBA	Second Team	Lisa Leslie	Los Angeles Sparks
All-WNBA	Second Team	Becky Hammon	New York Liberty
All-WNBA	Second Team	Diana Taurasi	Phoenix Mercury
All-Defensive	First Team	Tamika Catchings	Indiana Fever
All-Defensive	First Team	Sheryl Swoopes	Houston Comets
All-Defensive	First Team	Yolanda Griffith	Sacramento Monarchs
All-Defensive	First Team	Tully Bevilaqua	Indiana Fever
All-Defensive	First Team	Katie Douglas	Connecticut Sun
All-Defensive	Second Team	Lauren Jackson	Seattle Storm
All-Defensive	Second Team	Taj McWilliams-Franklin	Connecticut Sun
All-Defensive	Second Team	Lisa Leslie	Los Angeles Sparks
All-Defensive	Second Team	Alana Beard	Washington Mystics
All-Defensive	Second Team	Deanna Nolan	Detroit Shock
All-Rookie Team		Chelsea Newton	Sacramento Monarchs
All-Rookie Team		Kara Braxton	Detroit Shock
All-Rookie Team		Katie Feenstra	San Antonio Silver Stars
All-Rookie Team		Tan White	Indiana Fever
All-Rookie Team		Temeka Johnson	Washington Mystics

=== Players of the Week ===
Week ending	Player	Team
May 30	Sheryl Swoopes	Houston Comets
June 6	Lauren Jackson	Seattle Storm
June 13	Taj McWilliams-Franklin	Connecticut Sun
June 20	Tamika Catchings	Indiana Fever
June 27	Lindsay Whalen	Connecticut Sun
July 5	Sheryl Swoopes (2)	Houston Comets
July 18	Tamika Catchings (2)	Indiana Fever
July 25	Becky Hammon	New York Liberty
August 1	Janell Burse	Seattle Storm
August 8	Diana Taurasi	Phoenix Mercury
August 15	Katie Douglas	Connecticut Sun
August 22	Tamika Catchings (3)	Indiana Fever

== Coaches ==
=== Eastern Conference ===
- Charlotte Sting: Trudi Lacey and Tyrone Bogues
- Connecticut Sun: Mike Thibault
- Detroit Shock: Bill Laimbeer
- Indiana Fever: Brian Winters
- New York Liberty: Pat Coyle
- Washington Mystics: Richie Adubato

=== Western Conference ===
- Houston Comets: Van Chancellor
- Los Angeles Sparks: Henry Bibby and Joe Bryant
- Minnesota Lynx: Suzie McConnell Serio
- Phoenix Mercury: Carrie Graf
- Sacramento Monarchs: John Whisenant
- San Antonio Silver Stars: Dan Hughes
- Seattle Storm: Anne Donovan
