= Vickie Johnson =

American basketball player and coach (born 1972)

Personal information
- Born: April 15, 1972 (age 54) Coushatta, Louisiana, U.S.
- Listed height: 5 ft 9 in (1.75 m)
- Listed weight: 150 lb (68 kg)

Career information
- High school: Coushatta (Coushatta, Louisiana)
- College: Louisiana Tech (1992–1996)
- WNBA draft: 1997: 2nd round, 12th overall pick
- Drafted by: New York Liberty
- Playing career: 1997–2009
- Position: Shooting guard
- Number: 55
- Coaching career: 2011–present

Career history

Playing
- 1997–2005: New York Liberty
- 2006–2009: San Antonio Silver Stars

Coaching
- 2011–2016: San Antonio Stars (assistant)
- 2017: San Antonio Stars
- 2018–2020: Las Vegas Aces (assistant)
- 2021–2022: Dallas Wings
- 2023–2024: Atlanta Dream (assistant)

Career highlights
- 2× WNBA All-Star (1999, 2001); Kim Perrot Sportsmanship Award (2008); 2× Kodak All-American (1995, 1996); 2× All-American – USBWA (1995, 1996); First-team All-American – AP (1996); 2× Sun Belt Player of the Year (1995, 1996); Second-team All-American – AP (1995); Sun Belt Freshman of the Year (1993); 4× All-Sun Belt (1993–1996)
- Stats at WNBA.com
- Stats at Basketball Reference

Vickie Johnson (born April 15, 1972) is an American former basketball player and assistant coach of the Atlanta Dream. She was previously the head coach of the Dallas Wings in the WNBA. Johnson is the former head coach of the San Antonio Stars. Upon the sale and relocation of the Stars, Johnson was hired by head coach Bill Laimbeer as an assistant coach of the Las Vegas Aces, the Stars' decedent team.

== Early years ==
Johnson grew up in Coushatta, Louisiana. Johnson was a letter-man in basketball and track and field. In track and field, she was the Louisiana State Champion on the long jump as a senior.

== College years ==
Vickie Johnson was a two-time All-American and Sun Belt Conference MVP at Louisiana Tech University. She led the Lady Techsters to the 1994 NCAA Championship Game, was named Sun Belt Conference Player of the Year in 1995 and earned Louisiana Player of the Year honors in 1996. She finished her career at Louisiana Tech with 1,891 career points and 831 rebounds and was inducted into the Louisiana Tech Athletic Hall of Fame in 2007. She graduated from Louisiana Tech in 1996.

== WNBA career ==
=== New York Liberty ===
Johnson was selected 12th overall in the second round of the inaugural WNBA Elite draft in 1997 by the New York Liberty, which was composed of professional women's basketball players who had competed in other leagues, usually international leagues. Her debut game was played on June 21, 1997, in a 67 - 57 victory over the Los Angeles Sparks. In her debut, Johnson recorded 13 points, 8 rebounds, 2 assists and 1 steal.

She became an all - star for the first time in the 1999 season, averaging 13.3 points, 4.4 rebounds and 3.3 assists per game. Two years later in 2001, she became an all - star again and averaged 11.0 points, 3.3 rebounds and 2.7 assists per game.

From 1997 to 2005, the Liberty reached the playoffs in seven of those nine seasons and specifically reached the WNBA Finals in four of those instances (1997, 1999, 2000 and 2002). Unfortunately, even though Johnson was always a consistent and productive starter throughout those playoff appearances, the Liberty would lose in the Finals all four of those times.

In June 2005 in honor of Johnson's 3,000 points scored, Sandy Levine, owner of the world-famous Carnegie Deli in Manhattan, created the VJ Classic sandwich, a 3,000 calories (13,000 kJ) belly-busting sandwich.

From 1997 to 2005, Johnson started in 281 out of 282 games for the Liberty and averaged 11.5 points, 3.7 rebounds and 2.8 assists in 31.7 minutes per game in the regular season. She started in all 36 playoff games for the team and averaged 11.4 points, 4.3 rebounds and 3.4 assists in 32.9 minutes per game in the playoffs.

For the Liberty, Johnson is the all - time leader in career minutes played (8,950), 2nd in points (3,248), 2nd in field goals made (1,245), 3rd in rebounds (1,053) and 3rd in assists (787).

=== San Antonio Silver Stars ===
Johnson signed with the San Antonio Silver Stars on February 9, 2006. After not making the playoffs with the Silver Stars in her first season with the team, they would reach the playoffs in 2007 to 2009. The 2008 season specifically is the highest win - record that Johnson has been a part of, as the Silver Stars finished 24 - 10 and reached the Finals to face the Detroit Shock. The Silver Stars would fall to the Shock 3 - 0 while Johnson averaged 8.3 points, 4.7 rebounds and 3.1 assists during the entire playoffs.

Johnson retired from play at the end of 2009 season. She ended her career with the most games played out of all of the draftees from the 1997 Elite Draft (410 games played) and the second most number of games played throughout all draftees from 1997 (only trailing Tina Thompson from the college draft who played 496 games in her career).

Johnson's final WNBA game ever was played in Game 3 of the 2009 Western Conference First Round on September 21, 2009, against the Phoenix Mercury. Despite Johnson's incredible performance of 24 points, 6 rebounds, 2 assists and 3 steals, the Silver Stars would lose the game 92 - 100 and be eliminated from the playoffs.

=== Coaching career ===
After tying their franchise-worst record of 7 - 27 during the 2016 season, long time general manager and coach of the now "San Antonio Stars", Dan Hughes announced that he was relinquishing his role at both positions. On December 22, 2016, Johnson was hired as the replacement head coach in preparation for the 2017 season. Due to the team being purchased and relocating to Las Vegas to become the Las Vegas Aces the next year, the 2017 season was Johnson's only season coaching the team. The franchise finished with an 8 - 26 record in their final year in San Antonio.

On December 9, 2020, Johnson was hired as the head coach of the Dallas Wings. In her first season in Dallas, despite coaching players including Arike Ogunbowale, Allisha Gray, Kayla Thornton and Marina Mabrey, the team finished the 2021 season at 14 - 18 and missed the playoffs. The Wings turned their destiny around for the 2022 season, keeping the same core of Ogunbowale, Gray, Thornton and Mabrey and made the playoffs with an even 18 - 18 record. The team was eliminated in the first round by the Connecticut Sun 2 - 1, including a 25 - point loss in Game 1 on August 18. Despite the playoff berth, the Wings front office decided not to exercise Johnson's team option and fired her as head coach on September 19.

== Career statistics ==
Legend
GP	Games played	GS	Games started	MPG	Minutes per game	RPG	Rebounds per game
APG	Assists per game	SPG	Steals per game	BPG	Blocks per game	PPG	Points per game
TO	Turnovers per game	FG%	Field-goal percentage	3P%	3-point field-goal percentage	FT%	Free-throw percentage
**Bold**	Career best	°	League leader

=== WNBA career statistics ===
==== Regular season ====
Year	Team	GP	GS	MPG	FG%	3P%	FT%	RPG	APG	SPG	BPG	TO	PPG
1997	New York	26	25	30.3	40.4	19.0	77.1	4.2	2.5	0.7	0.2	1.9	9.6
1998	New York	30	30	30.2	44.6	37.5	76.8	3.8	2.5	1.0	0.2	1.5	12.5
1999	New York	32	32	**33.8**	41.9	35.2	83.7	4.4	3.3	**1.4**	0.0	2.0	13.3
2000	New York	31	31	33.0	44.1	38.0	88.2	4.4	2.5	0.7	0.2	1.8	12.3
2001	New York	32	32	29.3	41.4	36.6	75.7	3.3	2.7	1.1	0.1	1.6	11.0
2002	New York	31	31	33.2	45.6	42.1	80.3	3.5	2.8	0.9	0.1	1.5	11.6
2003	New York	32	32	32.6	45.8	36.5	85.9	3.0	2.3	0.9	0.2	1.7	**13.4**
2004	New York	**34**	**34**	32.9	41.3	28.3	**88.6**	3.6	**3.6**	0.7	0.1	2.1	9.4
2005	New York	**34**	**34**	30.1	**47.4**	35.7	77.4	3.5	2.7	0.7	0.1	1.3	10.4
2006	San Antonio	**34**	**34**	29.5	37.5	33.3	84.4	4.9	**3.6**	0.8	0.1	1.7	9.9
2007	San Antonio	30	29	28.4	44.4	**42.9**	82.1	4.8	3.5	1.1	**0.3**	**1.2**	8.1
2008	San Antonio	32	32	27.9	43.9	28.2	77.8	**5.3**	**3.6**	0.8	0.2	1.5	6.7
2009	San Antonio	32	32	23.0	43.2	37.5	85.2	3.4	2.4	0.5	0.1	1.2	6.4
Career	13 years, 2 teams	410	408	30.3	43.1	35.8	82.1	4.0	2.9	0.9	0.1	1.6	10.4

==== Playoffs ====
Year	Team	GP	GS	MPG	FG%	3P%	FT%	RPG	APG	SPG	BPG	TO	PPG
1997	New York	2	2	34.0	42.3	0.0	50.0	**6.0**	2.0	1.0	**0.5**	1.0	11.5
1999	New York	6	6	30.8	42.1	40.0	64.3	3.5	3.0	0.3	0.3	2.5	10.2
2000	New York	7	7	33.9	38.0	27.3	85.7	5.0	3.4	1.1	0.0	1.9	10.3
2001	New York	6	6	36.3	45.3	27.3	**100.0**	4.5	**4.7**	**2.2**	0.3	2.3	14.8
2002	New York	8	8	30.5	48.0	51.9	75.0	3.8	3.0	0.9	0.0	1.4	12.3
2004	New York	5	5	32.2	35.9	20.0	91.7	4.4	3.2	1.0	0.2	**0.8**	8.2
2005	New York	2	2	**36.5**	45.5	0.0	75.0	3.0	3.5	0.5	0.0	2.0	13.0
2007	San Antonio	5	5	33.0	36.7	42.1	50.0	5.8	4.6	1.2	0.2	1.8	9.4
2008	San Antonio	**9**	**9**	30.4	49.2	40.0	63.6	4.7	3.1	1.0	0.0	2.1	8.3
2009	San Antonio	3	3	30.0	**72.0**	**71.4**	83.3	3.0	**4.7**	1.7	0.0	1.0	**15.3**
Career	10 years, 2 teams	53	53	32.4	44.4	37.4	77.9	4.4	3.5	1.1	0.1	1.8	10.9

=== College ===
Year	Team	GP	GS	MPG	FG%	3P%	FT%	RPG	APG	SPG	BPG	TO	PPG
1992–93	Louisiana Tech	31	-	-	44.4	31.4	73.8	6.3	2.3	1.6	0.2	-	13.5
1993–94	Louisiana Tech	**35**	-	-	50.0	**42.9**	73.7	**7.0**	2.2	**1.9**	0.2	-	14.8
1994–95	Louisiana Tech	33	-	-	**53.2**	0.0	74.0	6.9	**2.8**	1.5	0.1	-	**16.4**
1995–96	Louisiana Tech	32	-	-	51.0	0.0	**79.0**	6.8	2.6	1.7	**0.3**	-	15.1
**Career**		131	-	-	49.8	33.3	75.2	6.7	2.4	1.7	0.2	-	15.0
Statistics retrieved from Sports-Reference.

== Coaching record ==
Legend
Regular season	G	Games coached	W	Games won	L	Games lost	W–L %	Win–loss %
Playoffs	PG	Playoff games	PW	Playoff wins	PL	Playoff losses	PW–L %	Playoff win–loss %

Team	Year	G	W	L	W–L%	Finish	PG	PW	PL	PW–L%	Result
SAS	2017	34	8	26	.235	6th in West	-	-	-	-	Missed Playoffs
DAL	2021	32	14	18	.438	5th in West	1	0	1	.000	Lost in 1st Round
DAL	2022	36	18	18	.500	3rd in West	3	1	2	.333	Lost in 1st Round
Career		102	40	62	.392		4	1	3	.250	

== European career ==
- 1996–1997: (France) Tarbes Gespe Bigorre
- 1997–1998: (France) W Bordeaux Basket
- 1998–2000: (Israel) Lachen Ramat Hasharon
- 2000–2001: (Israel) Elitzur Cellcom Holon
- 2004–2005: (Italy) Trentino Rovereto Basket
- 2005–2007: (Hungary) MiZo Pécs
- 2007–2008: (Turkey) Galatasaray
