= 2008 San Antonio Silver Stars season =

- Head coach: Dan Hughes
- Arena: AT&T Center

Results
- Record: 24–10 (.706)
- Place: 1st (Western)
- Playoff finish: Lost WNBA Finals

The 2008 WNBA season was the 12th season for the San Antonio Silver Stars.

== Offseason ==
=== Expansion draft ===
- Chantelle Anderson was selected in the 2008 Expansion Draft for the Atlanta Dream.

=== WNBA draft ===
Round	Pick	Player	Nationality	School/Club team
2	21 (from NY)	Chioma Nnamaka	Sweden	Georgia Tech
3	39	Alex Anderson	United States	Chattanooga

== Transactions ==
=== Trades ===
April 9, 2008; Sign and Trade	To San Antonio Silver Stars Ann Wauters, the draft rights to Morenike Atunrase, and Atlanta's 2009 second-round draft pick.	To Atlanta Dream Camille Little, the draft rights to Chioma Nnamaka, and San Antonio's 2009 first-round draft pick.

=== Free agents ===
Player	Signed	Former team
Brittany Wilkins	April 2, 2008	Sacramento Monarchs (2006)
Edwige Lawson-Wade	April 28, 2008	Seattle Storm (2006)

Player	Left	New team
Marie Ferdinand-Harris	February 22, 2008	Los Angeles Sparks

== Regular season ==
Silver Stars guard Shanna Crossley tore the ACL in her left knee during a preseason game against the Detroit Shock. The news was announced by head coach and general manager Dan Hughes on May 14. Crossley injured her knee during San Antonio's second offensive possession of the game.

=== Season standings ===
Western Conference	W	L	PCT	GB	Home	Road	Conf.
San Antonio Silver Stars ^{x}	24	10	.706	–	15–2	9–8	10–10
Seattle Storm ^{x}	22	12	.647	2.0	16–1	6–11	13–7
Los Angeles Sparks ^{x}	20	14	.588	4.0	12–5	8–9	12–8
Sacramento Monarchs ^{x}	18	16	.529	6.0	5–12	13–4	9–11
Houston Comets ^{o}	17	17	.500	7.0	13–4	4–13	10–10
Minnesota Lynx ^{o}	16	18	.471	8.0	10–7	6–11	8–12
Phoenix Mercury ^{o}	16	18	.471	8.0	9–8	7–10	8–12

=== Season schedule ===
Date	Opponent	Score	Leading Scorer	Attendance	Record
May 17	@ Sacramento	64-73	Sophia Young (22)	16,225	0-1
May 20	vs. Phoenix	81-76	Sophia Young (25)	9,103	1-1
May 24	vs. Seattle	87-72	Sophia Young (23)	9,767	2-1
May 30	@ Seattle	57-78	Sophia Young (14); Ann Wauters (14)	6,810	2-2
June 3	@ Houston	72-75	Becky Hammon (20)	7,059	2-3
June 6	vs. Washington	63-52	Becky Hammon (20)	5,800	3-3
June 8	@ Minnesota	78-90	Ann Wauters (24)	5,020	3-4
June 11	vs. Indiana	64-53	Sophia Young (17)	6,262	4-4
June 13	vs. Seattle	74-69	Becky Hammon (17)	6,478	5-4
June 15	@ Indiana	70-60	Ann Wauters (19)	7,412	6-4
June 18	@ Atlanta	81-66	Becky Hammon (25)	6,225	7-4
June 20	vs. Los Angeles	77-75	Ann Wauters (21)	10,221	8-4
June 24	vs. Houston	81-82 (OT)	Becky Hammon (25)	7,226	8-5
June 26	@ Houston	71-77	Sophia Young (19)	5,983	8-6
June 28	vs. Minnesota	73-65	Sophia Young (20)	7,513	9-6
July 1	vs. Detroit	79-72 (OT)	Sophia Young (27)	5,656	10-6
July 3	vs. Sacramento	68-67	Sophia Young (20)	6,568	11-6
July 6	@ Washington	83-75	Becky Hammon (28)	10,439	12-6
July 8	vs. New York	83-79	Becky Hammon (27)	6,107	13-6
July 10	@ Chicago	75-67	Ann Wauters (23)	3,040	14-6
July 11	vs. Atlanta	82-74	Becky Hammon (26)	10,943	15-6
July 14	@ Los Angeles	62-75	Becky Hammon (21)	11,976	15-7
July 15	@ Phoenix	97-87	Sophia Young (26)	6,451	16-7
July 19	vs. Minnesota	74-87	Becky Hammon (24)	8,614	16-8
July 24	vs. Chicago	78-67	Sophia Young (20)	9,372	17-8
July 25	@ Minnesota	68-78	Sophia Young (21)	7,247	17-9
July 27	@ Detroit	76-64	Becky Hammon (23)	9,537	18-9
August 28	@ Phoenix	77-55	Sophia Young (18)	7,931	19-9
August 30	@ Los Angeles	53-58	Becky Hammon (17)	9,923	19-10
September 5	vs. Los Angeles	76-58	Edwige Lawson-Wade (14)	9,531	20-10
September 7	@ Connecticut	85-73	Becky Hammon (24)	7,956	21-10
September 9	@ New York	82-76	Becky Hammon (30)	7,994	22-10
September 11	vs. Connecticut	78-74	Sophia Young (24)	6,791	23-10
September 13	vs. Sacramento	77-69	Ann Wauters (18)	9,770	24-10

== WNBA Playoffs ==
Date	Opponent	Score	Leading Scorer	Attendance	Series
Western Conference Semifinals
September 18	@ Sacramento	85-78	Becky Hammon (30)	7,740	SA leads 1-0
September 20	vs. Sacramento	67-84	Becky Hammon (14)	7,807	Tied 1-1
September 22	vs. Sacramento	86-81 (OT)	Sophia Young (27)	4,247	SA wins 2-1
Western Conference Finals
September 25	@ Los Angeles	70-85	Ann Wauters (18)	7,102°	LA leads 1-0
September 27	vs. Los Angeles	67-66	Sophia Young (21)	7,715	Tied 1-1
September 28	vs. Los Angeles	76-72	Becky Hammon (35)	7,111	SA wins 2-1
WNBA Finals
October 1	vs. Detroit	69-77	Sophia Young (21)	9,380	DET leads 1-0
October 3	vs. Detroit	61-69	Becky Hammon (24)	16,012	DET leads 2-0
October 5	@ Detroit	60-76	Ann Wauters (19)	8,952^	DET wins 3-0

° Played in the Galen Center, Los Angeles, CA
^ Played in the EMU Convocation Center, Ypsilanti, MI

== Player stats ==
Legend
GP	Games played	GS	Games started	MPG	Minutes per game
FG%	Field-goal percentage	3P%	3-point field-goal percentage	FT%	Free-throw percentage
RPG	Rebounds per game	APG	Assists per game	SPG	Steals per game
BPG	Blocks per game	PPG	Points per game

=== Regular season ===
Player	GP	GS	MPG	FG%	3P%	FT%	RPG	APG	SPG	BPG	PPG
Becky Hammon	33	33	33.4	.390	.350	.937	2.8	4.9	1.3	0.2	17.6
Sophia Young	33	33	31.9	.478	.000	.786	5.6	2.3	1.6	0.5	17.5
Ann Wauters	32	31	30.6	.533	.355	.714	7.5	1.8	1.1	1.2	14.7
Erin Buescher	34	23	26.7	.427	.431	.771	3.3	1.7	1.1	0.6	7.2
Vickie Johnson	32	32	27.9	.439	.282	.778	5.3	3.6	0.8	0.2	6.7
Ruth Riley	30	3	19.3	.434	.321	.857	3.6	1.0	0.5	1.4	5.1
Helen Darling	31	14	18.7	.268	.200	.789	2.4	1.7	1.1	0.1	3.5
Edwige Lawson-Wade	30	1	9.3	.450	.468	.667	1.0	0.9	0.4	0.0	3.3
Morenike Atunrase	33	0	10.5	.276	.293	.688	1.5	0.7	0.5	0.4	2.2
Sandora Irvin	21	0	5.5	.321	.250	.636	1.7	0.1	0.1	0.2	1.2
Adrianne Ross	4	0	1.8	.000	.000	1.000	0.3	0.0	0.0	0.0	0.5
Brittany Wilkins	1	0	0.0	.000	.000	.000	0.0	0.0	0.0	0.0	0.0
Valeriya Berezhynska	2	0	3.0	.000	.000	.000	0.0	0.0	0.0	0.0	0.0

San Antonio Silver Stars Regular Season Stats

=== Postseason ===
Player	GP	GS	MPG	FG%	3P%	FT%	RPG	APG	SPG	BPG	PPG
Becky Hammon	9	9	36.8	.421	.458	.895	2.3	4.6	1.0	0.6	18.1
Sophia Young	9	9	36.1	.456	.000	.750	5.9	1.7	1.6	0.1	17.7
Ann Wauters	9	9	33.3	.444	.083	.889	5.8	1.6	0.7	1.3	13.4
Vickie Johnson	9	9	30.4	.492	.400	.636	4.7	3.1	1.0	0.0	8.3
Erin Buescher	9	8	27.8	.380	.292	.733	2.9	1.7	0.8	0.2	6.2
Edwige Lawson-Wade	5	0	16.8	.318	.467	1.000	2.4	1.8	0.6	0.0	5.0
Ruth Riley	9	1	17.1	.212	.111	.750	2.1	1.1	0.4	0.9	2.0
Helen Darling	6	0	8.8	.385	.286	.000	1.2	0.8	0.5	0.0	2.0
Morenike Atunrase	8	0	5.5	.500	.500	.000	0.9	0.5	0.1	0.1	1.3
Sandora Irvin	3	0	1.3	.333	.000	.000	0.3	0.3	0.0	0.3	0.7
Adrianne Ross	2	0	1.5	.000	.000	.000	0.0	0.5	0.0	0.0	0.0
Brittany Wilkins	2	0	2.0	.000	.000	.000	0.0	0.0	1.0	0.0	0.0

San Antonio Silver Stars Playoff Stats

== Roster ==
2008 San Antonio Silver Stars roster
Players
Coaches

Pos.	No.	Nat.	Name	Height	Weight	From
G/F	24	(United States)	Atunrase, Morenike	5' 10" (1.78m)		Texas A&M
SF	7	(United States)	Buescher, Erin	6' 3" (1.91m)	181 lb (82kg)	Master's College
SG	5	(United States)	Crossley, Shanna (injured)	5' 10" (1.78m)	155 lb (70kg)	Tennessee
PG	30	(United States)	Darling, Helen	5' 6" (1.68m)	164 lb (74kg)	Penn State
PG	25	(United States)	Hammon, Becky	5' 6" (1.68m)	136 lb (62kg)	Colorado State
PF	50	(United States)	Irvin, Sandora	6' 3" (1.91m)	185 lb (84kg)	TCU
G/F	55	(United States)	Johnson, Vickie	5' 9" (1.75m)	150 lb (68kg)	Louisiana Tech
SG	9	(France)	Lawson-Wade, Edwige	5' 6" (1.68m)	130 lb (59kg)	France
C	00	(United States)	Riley, Ruth	6' 5" (1.96m)	198 lb (90kg)	Notre Dame
SG	32	(United States)	Ross, Adrianne	5' 8" (1.73m)	142 lb (64kg)	TCU
C	12	(Belgium)	Wauters, Ann	6' 4" (1.93m)	193 lb (88kg)	Belgium
C	51	(United States)	Wilkins, Brittany	6' 3" (1.91m)	185 lb (84kg)	Iowa State
PF	33	(United States)	Young, Sophia	6' 1" (1.85m)	165 lb (75kg)	Baylor

Head coach
(United States) Dan Hughes (Muskingum)
Assistant coaches
(Australia) Sandy Brondello (Australia WNBL)
(United States) Olaf Lange
(United States) Vanessa Nygaard
Athletic trainer
(United States) Tonya Holley (St. Andrew's Presbyterian)
Strength and conditioning coach
(United States) Mike Ekanem (Texas Lutheran)

Legend

- (C) Team captain
- (DP) Unsigned draft pick
- (FA) Free agent
- (S) Suspended
- Injured

WNBA roster page

== Awards and honors ==
- Sophia Young, WNBA Player of the Week (May 17–25)
- Becky Hammon, WNBA Player of the Week (July 7–13)
- Ann Wauters, WNBA Player of the Week (September 8–14)
- Sophia Young, WNBA All-Defensive First Team
- Vickie Johnson, Kim Perrot Sportsmanship Award
- Sophia Young, All-WNBA First Team
- Becky Hammon, All-WNBA Second Team
