= 2009 San Antonio Silver Stars season =

- Head coach: Dan Hughes
- Arena: AT&T Center

Results
- Record: 15–19 (.441)
- Place: 4th (Western)
- Playoff finish: Lost First Round

Media
- Television: KMYS

The 2009 WNBA season was the 13th season for the San Antonio Silver Stars franchise of the Women's National Basketball Association. It was their 7th in San Antonio. The Silver Stars were unsuccessful in their attempt to advance to the WNBA Finals for the second consecutive season.

== Offseason ==
=== Dispersal Draft ===
Based on the Silver Stars' 2008 record, they would pick 13th in the Houston Comets dispersal draft. The Silver Stars waived their pick.

=== WNBA draft ===
The following are the Silver Stars' selections in the 2009 WNBA draft.

Round	Pick	Player	Nationality	School/Team/Country
2	14 (from Atl.)	Megan Frazee	United States	Liberty
2	26	Sonja Petrovic	Serbia	Serbia
3	39	Candyce Bingham	United States	Louisville

=== Transactions ===
- July 31: The Silve Stars signed Ann Wauters and waived Katie Mattera.
- June 5: The Silver Stars waived Joyce Ekworomadu and Bernadette Ngoyisa.
- June 1: The Silver Stars waived Valeriya Berezhynska and Candyce Bingham.
- May 28: The Silver Stars waived Amber Petillion.
- May 25: The Silver Stars waived Morenike Atunrase and signed Joyce Ekworomadu.
- May 18: The Silver Stars signed Amber Petillion to a training camp contract.
- May 15: The Silver Stars waived Adrienne Ross.
- May 12: The Silver Stars waived Sandora Irvin.
- May 11: The Silver Stars signed Katie Feenstra Mattera.
- April 30: The Silver Stars re-signed Edwige Lawson-Wade.
- March 30: The Silver Stars signed Belinda Snell.
- March 16: The Silver Stars signed free agent Bernadette Ngoyisa.
- January 23: The Silver Stars signed Valeriya Berezhynska to a training-camp contract.
- January 8: The Silver Stars re-signed free agent Vickie Johnson.
- January 7: The Silver Stars signed Sophia Young to a three-year extension.
- April 9, 2008: The Silver Stars traded their first round 2009 Draft pick to the Atlanta Dream in exchange for the Dream's second round 2009 pick as part of the Ann Wauters/Camille Little transaction.

Date	Trade	
April 9, 2008	To San Antonio Silver Stars	To Atlanta Dream
April 9, 2008	2nd round 2009 Draft pick, Ann Wauters, Morenike Atunrase	1st round 2009 Draft pick, Camille Little, Chioma Nnamaka

=== Free agents ===
==== Additions ====
Player	Signed	Former team
Sophia Young	January 7, 2009	re-signed
Vickie Johnson	January 8, 2009	re-signed
Belinda Snell	March 30, 2009	Phoenix Mercury
Edwige Lawson-Wade	April 30, 2009	re-signed
Katie Mattera	May 11, 2009	Atlanta Dream

==== Subtractions ====
Player	Left	New team
Sandora Irvin	May 12, 2009	free agent
Adrienne Ross	May 15, 2009	free agent
Morenike Atunrase	May 25, 2009	free agent
Candyce Bingham	June 1, 2009	free agent
Katie Mattera	July 31, 2009	free agent

== Roster ==
2009 San Antonio Silver Stars roster
Players
Coaches

Pos.	No.	Nat.	Name	Height	Weight	From
SG	5	(United States)	Crossley, Shanna	5' 10" (1.78m)	155 lb (70kg)	Tennessee
PG	30	(United States)	Darling, Helen	5' 6" (1.68m)	164 lb (74kg)	Penn State
G/F	40	(United States)	Frazee, Megan	6' 3" (1.91m)	191 lb (87kg)	Liberty University
PG	25	(United States)	Hammon, Becky	5' 6" (1.68m)	136 lb (62kg)	Colorado State
G/F	55	(United States)	Johnson, Vickie	5' 9" (1.75m)	150 lb (68kg)	Louisiana Tech
SG	9	(France)	Lawson-Wade, Edwige	5' 6" (1.68m)	130 lb (59kg)	France
SF	7	(United States)	Perperoglou, Erin	6' 3" (1.91m)	181 lb (82kg)	Master's College
C	00	(United States)	Riley, Ruth	6' 5" (1.96m)	198 lb (90kg)	Notre Dame
SG	10	(Australia)	Snell, Belinda	5' 9" (1.75m)	170 lb (77kg)	Australia
C	12	(Belgium)	Wauters, Ann	6' 4" (1.93m)	193 lb (88kg)	Belgium
PF	33	(Saint Vincent and the Grenadines)	Young, Sophia	6' 1" (1.85m)	165 lb (75kg)	Baylor

Head coach
(United States) Dan Hughes (Muskingum)
Assistant coaches
(Australia) Sandy Brondello (Australia)
(United States) Olaf Lange
Athletic trainer
(United States) Tonya Holley (St. Andrew's Presbyterian)
Strength and conditioning coach
(United States) Mike Ekanem (Texas Lutheran)

Legend

- (C) Team captain
- (DP) Unsigned draft pick
- (FA) Free agent
- (S) Suspended
- Injured

WNBA roster page

== Season standings ==
Western Conference	W	L	PCT	GB	Home	Road	Conf.
Phoenix Mercury ^{x}	23	11	.676	–	12–5	11–6	13–7
Seattle Storm ^{x}	20	14	.588	3.0	13–4	7–10	13–7
Los Angeles Sparks ^{x}	18	16	.529	5.0	11–6	7–10	11–9
San Antonio Silver Stars ^{x}	15	19	.441	8.0	10–7	5–12	10–10
Minnesota Lynx ^{o}	14	20	.412	9.0	9–8	5–12	7–13
Sacramento Monarchs ^{o}	12	22	.353	11.0	7–10	5–12	6–14

== Schedule ==
=== Preseason ===
2009 Game Log: Preseason

Game	Date	Time (ET)	Opponent	Score	High points	High rebounds	High assists	Location/Attendance	Record
1	May 30	7:00pm	@ Detroit	55-62	Young (14)	Mattera (8)	Johnson (4)	Traverse City West H.S. 2,109	0-1
2	June 2	8:00pm	Indiana	60-67	Hammon (12)	Frazee (8)	Johnson (3)	Austin Convention Center	0-2

=== Regular season ===
2009 Game Log: Regular Season
June

Game	Date	Time (ET)	Opponent	TV	Score	High points	High rebounds	High assists	Location/Attendance	Record
1	June 6	10:00pm	@ Phoenix	NBA TV; KMYS	79-90	Young (25)	Riley (13)	Hammon (8)	US Airways Center; 13,582	0-1
2	June 13	8:00pm	New York	NBA TV; KMYS; MSG	63-60	Hammon (16)	Johnson (7)	Hammon (4)	AT&T Center; 10,572	1-1
3	June 19	7:30pm	@ New York	NBA TV; MSG	61-77	Crossley, Lawson-Wade (12)	Young (7)	Darling, Lawson-Wade (4)	Madison Square Garden; 8,046	1-2
4	June 21	3:00pm	@ Connecticut	NBA TV; WCTX	58-71	Young (22)	Riley, Young (7)	Darling (4)	Mohegan Sun Arena; 6,928	1-3
5	June 23	7:30pm	Phoenix	ESPN2	91-87	Hammon (19)	Young (8)	Young (5)	AT&T Center; 6,692	2-3
6	June 26	8:00pm	Sacramento		62-52	Hammon (26)	Young (10)	Hammon (6)	AT&T Center; 7,973	3-3
7	June 20	8:00pm	Washington		82-84	Young (21)	Johnson (7)	Darling (6)	AT&T Center; 4,723	3-4

July

Game	Date	Time (ET)	Opponent	TV	Score	High points	High rebounds	High assists	Location/Attendance	Record
8	July 3	8:00pm	Chicago		85-72	Young (19)	Riley, Young (8)	Hammon (10)	AT&T Center; 6,662	4-4
9	July 7	3:00pm	@ Seattle		53-66	Hammon (13)	Young (7)	Hammon (5)	KeyArena; 10,137	4-5
10	July 10	8:00pm	@ Minnesota		77-61	Young (21)	Riley (9)	Lawson-Wade (4)	Target Center; 7,409	5-5
11	July 12	7:00pm	Minnesota	NBA TV; KMYS	76-83	Hammon (26)	Young (8)	Hammon (5)	AT&T Center; 6,568	5-6
12	July 15	11:30am	@ Washington		79-78	Hammon (21)	Frazee (6)	Darling, Hammon (5)	Verizon Center; 17,220	6-6
13	July 17	8:00pm	Connecticut		64-72	Hammon (24)	Frazee, Young (9)	Hammon (4)	AT&T Center; 9,524	6-7
14	July 19	6:00pm	@ Chicago	NBA TV; CN100	75-85	Hammon (22)	Hammon, Perperoglou (5)	Hammon, Johnson (3)	UIC Pavilion; 3,282	6-8
15	July 23	12:30pm	Indiana		84-65	Young (24)	Frazee (8)	Hammon, Johnson (4)	AT&T Center; 9,985	7-8
16	July 28	8:00pm	Seattle	KMYS	74-71	Hammon (24)	Frazee (7)	Hammon (4)	AT&T Center; 5,382	8-8
17	July 30	2:30pm	@ Sacramento		93-101 (OT)	Hammon (38)	Young (11)	Hammon (6)	ARCO Arena; 10,461	8-9

August

Game	Date	Time (ET)	Opponent	TV	Score	High points	High rebounds	High assists	Location/Attendance	Record
18	August 1	10:00pm	@ Seattle	NBA TV; KMYS	82-85 (OT)	Hammon (20)	Hammon (10)	Young (4)	KeyArena; 8,167	8-10
19	August 4	3:00pm	@ Los Angeles		63-59	Hammon (20)	Young (9)	Hammon (5)	STAPLES Center; 13,865	9-10
20	August 6	8:00pm	Atlanta		84-92	Hammon (26)	Young (9)	Snell (4)	AT&T Center; 5,042	9-11
21	August 9	6:00pm	@ Minnesota		89-87	Hammon (22)	Young (7)	Hammon (9)	Target Center; 7,764	10-11
22	August 11	8:00pm	Sacramento		73-90	Young (14)	Hammon, Young (6)	Johnson, Lawson-Wade (5)	AT&T Center; 4,961	10-12
23	August 13	10:00pm	@ Phoenix		83-95	Young (29)	Wauters (10)	Hammon (8)	US Airways Center; 6,522	10-13
24	August 15	8:00pm	Phoenix	NBA TV; KMYS	106-89	Young (25)	Frazee (9)	Hammon (6)	AT&T Center; 8,933	11-13
25	August 20	7:30pm	@ Atlanta		87-93	Hammon (23)	Wauters (7)	Hammon, Lawson-Wade (5)	Philips Arena; 5,848	11-14
26	August 21	8:00pm	Los Angeles	NBA TV; KMYS	66-67 (OT)	Young (31)	Young (7)	Hammon (6)	AT&T Center; 9,540	11-15
27	August 23	6:00pm	@ Detroit		84-99	Young (19)	Young (5)	Darling (7)	Palace of Auburn Hills; 7,130	11-16
28	August 27	7:00pm	@ Indiana	NBA TV; FSI	66-77	Wauters, Young (18)	Wauters (14)	Hammon (6)	Conseco Fieldhouse; 6,836	11-17
29	August 29	3:00pm	Detroit	ESPN2	100-88 (OT)	Hammon (32)	Wauters (11)	Hammon (9)	AT&T Center; 7,735	12-17

September

Game	Date	Time (ET)	Opponent	TV	Score	High points	High rebounds	High assists	Location/Attendance	Record
30	September 1	8:00pm	Minnesota		84-82 (2OT)	Hammon (29)	Riley (8)	Hammon (5)	AT&T Center; 4,881	13-17
31	September 5	8:00pm	Los Angeles		89-72	Johnson (27)	Lawson-Wade (5)	Lawson-Wade (11)	AT&T Center; 8,631	14-17
32	September 8	10:30pm	@ Los Angeles	NBA TV; KMYS	68-76	Crossley (16)	Hammon, Wauters, Young (4)	Hammon (7)	STAPLES Center; 10,476	14-18
33	September 10	10:00pm	@ Sacramento		80-71	Hammon (27)	Wauters, Young (6)	Johnson, Lawson-Wade (5)	ARCO Arena; 7,566	15-18
34	September 12	8:00pm	Seattle		55-64	Crossley (12)	Perperoglou (11)	Darling (6)	AT&T Center; 10,153	15-19

All games are viewable on WNBA LiveAccess

=== Postseason ===
2009 Game Log: Postseason
Western Conference Semifinals

Game	Date	Time (ET)	Opponent	TV	Score	High points	High rebounds	High assists	Location/Attendance	Series
1	September 17	9:00pm	Phoenix	ESPN2	92-91	Young (24)	Wauters (11)	Johnson (8)	AT&T Center; 5,721	1-0
2	September 19	10:00pm	@ Phoenix	NBA TV	78-106	Young (19)	Wauters (5)	Johnson (4)	US Airways Center; 7,267	1-1
3	September 21	10:00pm	@ Phoenix	ESPN2	92-100	Hammon (29)	Young (8)	Wauters (5)	US Airways Center; 6,895	1-2

== Regular Season Statistics ==
Legend
GP	Games played	GS	Games started	MPG	Minutes per game	RPG	Rebounds per game
APG	Assists per game	SPG	Steals per game	BPG	Blocks per game	PPG	Points per game
FG%	Field-goal percentage	3P%	3-point field-goal percentage	FT%	Free-throw percentage	TO	Turnovers per game
PF	Fouls per game		Team leader		League leader

=== Player statistics ===
Player	GP	GS	MPG	RPG	APG	SPG	BPG	PPG
Shanna Crossley	0	0	00.0	0.0	0.0	0.00	0.00	0.0
Helen Darling	0	0	00.0	0.0	0.0	0.00	0.00	0.0
Katie Mattera	0	0	00.0	0.0	0.0	0.00	0.00	0.0
Megan Frazee	0	0	00.0	0.0	0.0	0.00	0.00	0.0
Becky Hammon	0	0	00.0	0.0	0.0	0.00	0.00	0.0
Vickie Johnson	0	0	00.0	0.0	0.0	0.00	0.00	0.0
Edwige Lawson-Wade	0	0	00.0	0.0	0.0	0.00	0.00	0.0
Erin Perperoglou	0	0	00.0	0.0	0.0	0.00	0.00	0.0
Ruth Riley	0	0	00.0	0.0	0.0	0.00	0.00	0.0
Belinda Snell	0	0	00.0	0.0	0.0	0.00	0.00	0.0
Ann Wauters	0	0	00.0	0.0	0.0	0.00	0.00	0.0
Sophia Young	0	0	00.0	0.0	0.0	0.00	0.00	0.0

=== Team statistics ===
Team	FG%	3P%	FT%	RPG	APG	SPG	BPG	TO	PF	PPG
San Antonio Silver Stars	.000	.000	.000	00.0	00.0	0.0	0.0	00.0	00.0	00.0
Opponents	.000	.000	.000	00.0	00.0	0.0	0.0	00.0	00.0	00.0

== Awards and honors ==
- Becky Hammon was named WNBA Western Conference Player of the Week for the week of July 27, 2009.
- Becky Hammon was named WNBA Western Conference Player of the Week for the week of August 3, 2009.
- Vickie Johnson was named WNBA Western Conference Player of the Week for the week of August 31, 2009.
- Becky Hammon was named to the 2009 WNBA All-Star Team as a Western Conference starter.
- Sophia Young was named to the 2009 WNBA All-Star Team as a Western Conference reserve.
- Becky Hammon was named to the All-WNBA First Team.
- Sophia Young was named to the All-WNBA Second Team.
