= Edwige Lawson-Wade =

French basketball player (born 1979)

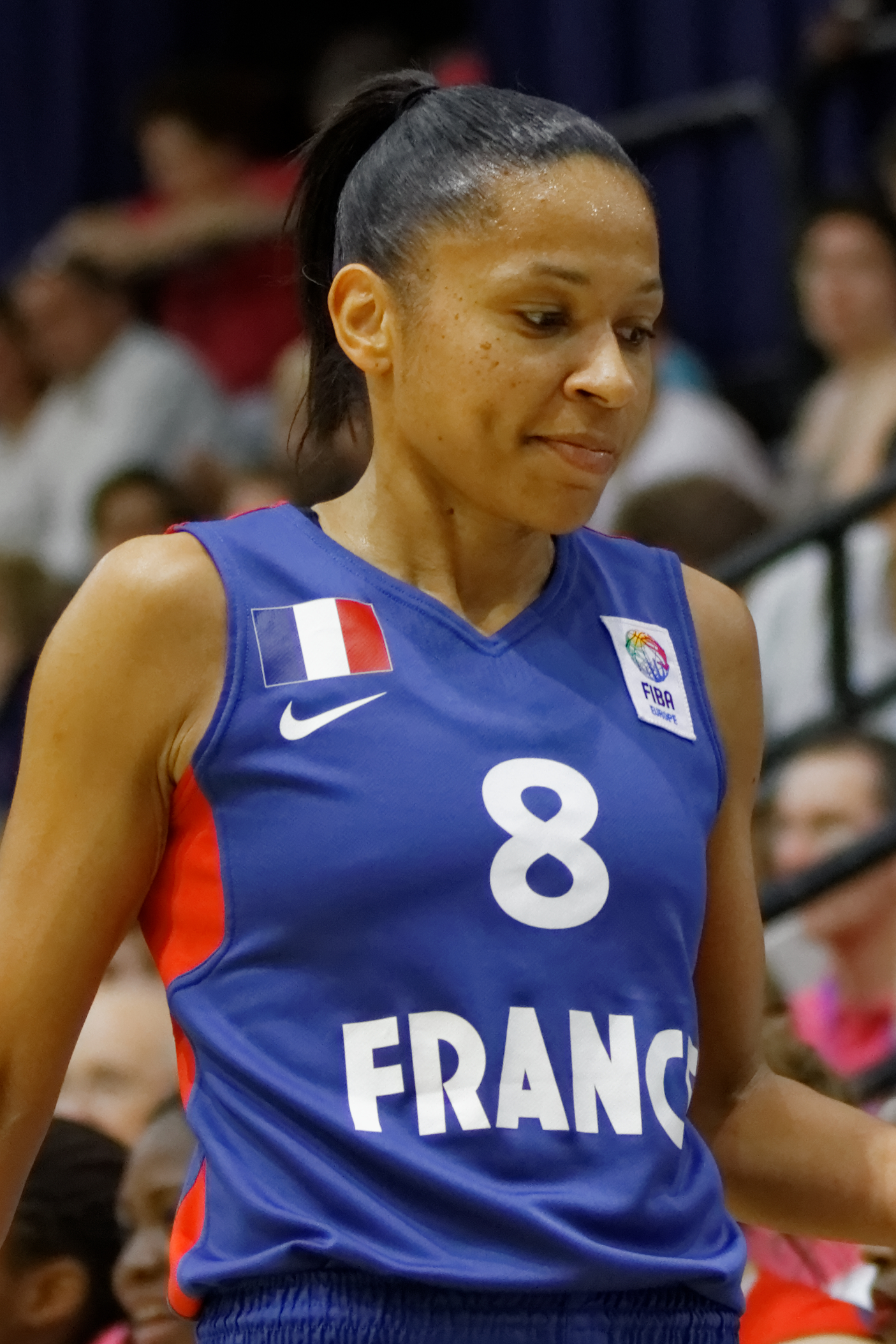

Personal information
- Born: 14 May 1979 (age 47) Rennes, Ille-et-Vilaine, Brittany, France
- Listed height: 5 ft 6 in (1.68 m)
- Listed weight: 130 lb (59 kg)

Career information
- Playing career: 2005–present
- Position: Point guard

Career history
- 2005: New York Liberty
- 2005: Houston Comets
- 2006: Seattle Storm
- 2007–2010: San Antonio Silver Stars
- Stats at WNBA.com
- Stats at Basketball Reference
Medals
Women's basketball
Representing France
Olympic Games
Silver medal – second place	2012 London	Team
EuroBasket
Gold medal – first place	2001 France	Team
Silver medal – second place	1999 Poland	Team
Silver medal – second place	2013 France	Team
Bronze medal – third place	2011 Poland	Team

Edwige Lawson (born 14 May 1979), also Edwige Lawson-Wade, is a French former professional women's basketball player.

== Professional career ==
A point guard, Lawson-Wade started her professional career at the age of 17.

She played in Bordeaux, Aix-en-Provence, and Valenciennes in France.

Lawson-Wade also played in the WNBA for the San Antonio Silver Stars, New York Liberty, the Houston Comets and the Seattle Storm, and also for CSKA Moscow in the Russian Superleague.

Her resume includes three French championships, two Russian championships and three Euroleague titles (two with Valenciennes and one with CSKA Samara).

=== European career ===
- 1994–1995: (France) CJM Bourges Basket
- 1995–1997: (France) Waïti Bordeaux
- 1997–2001: (France) ASPTT Aix-en-Provence
- 2001–2004: (France) US Valenciennes Olympic
- 2004–2007: (Russia) VBM-SGAU Samara
- 2007–2009: (Russia) CSKA Moscow
- 2009–2010: (Russia) WBC Spartak Moscow Region
- 2010–2011: (Spain) Ros Casares
- 2011–2013: (France) Basket Lattes MA

== International career ==
Lawson-Wade was also the starting point guard for the France national women's basketball team, with whom she won a silver medal at the 2012 London Olympic Games.

She also won a European Championship with France.

Lawson-Wade was the three-point competition champion at the 2008 FIBA Europe All-Star game.

== Career statistics ==
Legend
GP	Games played	GS	Games started	MPG	Minutes per game	RPG	Rebounds per game
APG	Assists per game	SPG	Steals per game	BPG	Blocks per game	PPG	Points per game
TO	Turnovers per game	FG%	Field-goal percentage	3P%	3-point field-goal percentage	FT%	Free-throw percentage
**Bold**	Career best	°	League leader

=== WNBA ===
==== Regular season ====
WNBA regular season statistics
Year	Team	GP	GS	MPG	FG%	3P%	FT%	RPG	APG	SPG	BPG	TO	PPG
2005	New York	2	0	6.0	.000	.000	**1.000**	1.0	0.0	0.0	0.0	**0.0**	1.0
2005	Houston	17	0	6.7	.333	.385	**1.000**	0.4	0.2	0.1	**0.1**	0.7	1.5
2006	Seattle	26	0	8.1	.378	.263	.667	0.8	1.1	0.6	0.0	0.7	1.7
2007	Did not appear in league												
2008	San Antonio	30	1	9.3	**.450**	**.468**	.667	1.0	0.9	0.4	0.0	0.8	3.3
2009	San Antonio	**33**	12	17.7	.384	.363	.833	**2.0**	2.2	0.9	0.0	0.9	5.2
2010	San Antonio	**33**	**19**	**21.9**	.370	.339	.907	1.9	**2.8**	**1.1**	**0.1**	1.4	**6.5**
**Career**	5 years, 4 teams	141	32	13.6	.384	.361	.854	1.4	1.6	0.7	0.0	0.9	4.0

==== Playoffs ====
WNBA playoff statistics
Year	Team	GP	GS	MPG	FG%	3P%	FT%	RPG	APG	SPG	BPG	TO	PPG
2005	Houston	1	0	1.0	—	—	—	0.0	0.0	0.0	0.0	**0.0**	0.0
2006	Seattle	3	0	3.7	.250	.250	.500	0.0	0.3	0.0	0.0	**0.0**	1.3
2008	San Antonio	**5**	0	16.8	.318	.467	**1.000**	2.4	1.8	0.6	0.0	1.0	5.0
2009	San Antonio	3	**3**	25.0	**.667**	.615	—	**3.0**	2.0	0.7	0.0	1.0	10.7
2010	San Antonio	2	2	**28.5**	.538	**.625**	**1.000**	1.5	**4.0**	**2.0**	**0.5**	0.5	**12.5**
**Career**	5 years, 3 teams	14	5	16.3	.474	.525	.917	1.7	1.7	0.6	0.1	0.6	6.1

== Personal life ==
Lawson-Wade is of Beninese descent through her father.

Lawson is married to professional basketball coach, James Wade. They have a son, James "Jet" Wade III.

She was inducted into the French Basketball Hall of Fame in 2019.
