= Erin Perperoglou =

American basketball player (born 1979)

Personal information
- Born: June 5, 1979 (age 47) San Francisco, California, U.S.
- Listed height: 6 ft 3 in (1.91 m)
- Listed weight: 181 lb (82 kg)

Career information
- High school: Rincon Valley Christian (Santa Rosa, California)
- College: UC Santa Barbara (1997–2000); The Master's College (2000–2001)
- WNBA draft: 2001: 2nd round, 23rd overall pick
- Drafted by: Minnesota Lynx
- Playing career: 2001–2009
- Position: Forward
- Number: 11, 7, 12

Career history
- 2001: Minnesota Lynx
- 2002–2003: Charlotte Sting
- 2005–2006: Sacramento Monarchs
- 2007–2009: San Antonio Silver Stars

Career highlights
- WNBA champion (2005); WNBA Most Improved Player (2006); Third-team All-American – AP (2000); 3× Big West Player of the Year (1998–2000); 3× First-team All-Big West (1998–2000); Big West Freshman of the Year (1998); Big West All-Freshman Team (1998)
- Stats at WNBA.com
- Stats at Basketball Reference
Medals
Jones Cup
Gold medal – first place	1998 Taipei	Team competition

Erin Buescher Perperoglou (born June 5, 1979) is an American former professional basketball player. In her WNBA career, Perperoglou played more than 2,500 minutes in 150 WNBA games, including 9 playoff games, scoring nearly 900 career points and accumulating 500 rebounds. She announced her retirement from the WNBA at the conclusion of the 2009 season.

== Early life ==
Born in San Francisco, California, Perperoglou is the daughter of Jim and Margie Buescher. She has two sisters, Jenny and Emily, and a brother, James. From 1997 to 2000 she attended University of California, Santa Barbara (UCSB) for her freshman, sophomore, and junior years, helping to lead its women's basketball team (The Gauchos) to an 83–14 record during that three-year period. In each of those years Buescher Perperoglou was named the Big West Conference Player of the Year, UCSB won the Big West Conference title, and the team appeared in the NCAA tournament.

In September 2000, Buescher Perperoglou, a devout Christian, transferred to The Master's College, a small Christian college in Santa Clarita, California.

During her senior year at Master's, Buescher Perperoglou helped lead their team (The Lady Mustangs) to a 26–3 record and a National Association of Intercollegiate Athletics (NAIA) tournament appearance. She was an NAIA first-team All-American and was voted the National Christian College Athletic Association player of the year.

== USA Basketball ==
Buescher was named to the team representing the US at the 1998 William Jones Cup competition in Taipei, Taiwan. She scored six points over the five games.

== WNBA career ==
=== Minnesota Lynx ===
On April 11, 2001, Buescher Perperoglou was drafted by the Minnesota Lynx in the second round (No. 23 overall) of the 2001 WNBA draft. She spent her rookie year with the Lynx, playing in all of the team's 32 games that year and starting 19 times. She led the Lynx team with 29 blocked shots.

=== Charlotte Sting ===
In a 2002 WNBA multi-player draft-day deal, the Charlotte Sting acquired Buescher Perperoglou and teammate Maylana Martin from the Lynx in exchange for Shaunzinski Gortman and Charlotte's No. 9 overall selection in the 2002 WNBA Draft.

During the 2002 WNBA season, Buescher Perperoglou averaged 3.3 points per game in 29 games with Charlotte, but had to miss the final 3 games of the regular season due to a sprained left ankle. During the 2003 WNBA season she only averaged 0.6 points per game in 14 games with the Sting and missed the 11 remaining games of the regular season due to a strained lower back.

Buescher Perperoglou took a hiatus from the WNBA in 2004 but played in New Zealand for the Harbour Breeze and in Greece for Akademia during the 2004-05 WNBA off-season. She returned to the WNBA in 2005.

=== Sacramento Monarchs ===
The Charlotte Sting traded Buescher Perperoglou, along with teammates Nicole Powell and Olympia Scott-Richardson, to the Sacramento Monarchs in exchange for Tangela Smith and a second-round draft pick in the 2006 WNBA draft. The Monarchs off-season trades paid off and they finished with a franchise-best 25–9 record. They won their first WNBA Finals by defeating the Connecticut Sun three games to one in a best-of-five playoff series, which brought Sacramento its first major championship in a professional sport. Buescher Perperoglou averaged 3.3 points per game in 23 games with the Monarchs but missed 11 games due to lumbar strain.

During the early part of the 2006 WNBA season, the Monarchs played Buescher Perperoglou more often after teammate DeMya Walker went on maternity leave. Buescher Perperoglou went on to lead the WNBA in field goal percentage (.537) during the regular season and was awarded the 2006 WNBA Most Improved Player Award.

=== San Antonio Silver Stars ===
In March 2007, Buescher Perperoglou signed with the San Antonio Silver Stars as a restricted free agent. During the 2007 season she averaged 11.3 points, 6.1 rebounds, 2.2 assist and 1.9 steals per game. She was the reigning Western Conference Player of the Week when she suffered a season-ending knee injury less than a minute into a game against the Phoenix Mercury on July 11.

== Off the court ==
Buescher Perperoglou was a local broadcast commentator for Silver Stars games during her convalescence from an Anterior Cruciate Ligament rupture and reconstructive surgery. She married Stratos Perperoglou, who plays basketball for the Spanish ACB League team FC Barcelona. Buescher Perperoglou also started a Healthful Hints column for fans on the Silver Stars' website.

Buescher Perperoglou is an avid surfer and belongs to a Christian surfers' organization. She has said in interviews that she is interested in missionary work after her playing career ends. In a Sacramento Bee article in 2006, Buescher Perperoglou revealed she purchased land near a beach in Costa Rica and said that she dreamed of owning a coffee shop in the area. Buescher Perperoglou speaks fluent Spanish and is learning Greek.

== Career statistics ==
=== WNBA ===
Legend
GP	Games played	GS	Games started	MPG	Minutes per game	RPG	Rebounds per game
APG	Assists per game	SPG	Steals per game	BPG	Blocks per game	PPG	Points per game
TO	Turnovers per game	FG%	Field-goal percentage	3P%	3-point field-goal percentage	FT%	Free-throw percentage
**Bold**	Career best	°	League leader

†	Denotes seasons in which Perperoglou won a WNBA championship

==== Regular season ====
Year	Team	GP	GS	MPG	FG%	3P%	FT%	RPG	APG	SPG	BPG	TO	PPG
2001	Minnesota	32	19	22.7	.348	.276	.618	3.7	1.9	0.8	**0.9**	2.0	5.7
2002	Charlotte	29	0	13.5	.402	.364	.694	3.1	0.6	0.4	0.5	0.9	3.3
2003	Charlotte	14	0	3.1	.375	.000	.750	0.3	0.2	0.0	0.0	0.1	0.6
2005^{†}	Sacramento	23	0	9.1	**.700**	.000	.588	1.3	0.6	0.7	0.2	1.1	3.3
2006	Sacramento	**34**	12	19.6	.537	.000	.750	3.9	1.0	1.0	0.4	1.6	9.7
2007	San Antonio	18	11	**27.7**	.462	.265	**.816**	**6.1**	**2.2**	'1.9	0.7	2.4	**11.3**
2008	San Antonio	**34**	**23**	26.7	.427	**.431**	.771	3.3	1.7	1.1	0.6	1.5	7.2
2009	San Antonio	**34**	9	17.0	.323	.318	.676	2.2	0.9	0.7	0.3	1.0	2.7
Career	8 years, 4 teams	218	74	18.4	.440	.344	.722	3.1	1.2	0.8	0.5	1.4	5.7

==== Playoffs ====
Year	Team	GP	GS	MPG	FG%	3P%	FT%	RPG	APG	SPG	BPG	TO	PPG
2002	Charlotte	2	0	15.5	**.875**	**1.000**	.500	**3.5**	0.5	0.0	**0.5**	1.5	**8.5**
2005^{†}	Sacramento	3	0	4.3	.000	.000	.500	1.3	0.7	0.0	0.3	0.3	1.0
2006	Sacramento	**9**	0	11.7	.379	**1.000**	.636	1.8	1.0	**0.8**	0.2	0.1	3.3
2008	San Antonio	**9**	**8**	**27.8**	.380	.292	.733	2.9	**1.7**	**0.8**	0.2	2.1	6.2
2009	San Antonio	3	0	11.0	.111	.000	**1.000**	0.3	0.7	0.7	0.3	0.7	1.3
Career	5 years, 3 teams	26	8	16.6	.396	.300	.658	2.1	1.1	0.6	0.3	1.0	4.2

Legend
GP	Games played	GS	Games started	MPG	Minutes per game	RPG	Rebounds per game
APG	Assists per game	SPG	Steals per game	BPG	Blocks per game	PPG	Points per game
TO	Turnovers per game	FG%	Field-goal percentage	3P%	3-point field-goal percentage	FT%	Free-throw percentage
**Bold**	Career best	°	League leader

=== College ===
Year	Team	GP	GS	MPG	FG%	3P%	FT%	RPG	APG	SPG	BPG	TO	PPG
1997–98	UCSB	31	-	-	51.7	38.9	67.9	8.7	3.0	2.6	**1.4**	-	17.1
1998–99	UCSB	30	-	-	**52.4**	47.3	**71.8**	9.1	**3.4**	**2.8**	0.5	-	**19.9**
1999–00	UCSB	**33**	-	-	49.5	**54.0**	65.0	**9.7**	2.9	2.0	1.2	-	17.3
**Career**		94	-	-	51.2	38.4	68.4	9.2	3.1	2.4	1.1	-	18.1
Statistics retrieved from Sports-Reference.
