= Megan Frazee =

American professional basketball player

Megan Frazee Leuzinger
Personal information
- Born: March 29, 1987 (age 39) Laredo, Texas, U.S.
- Listed height: 6 ft 3 in (1.91 m)
- Listed weight: 191 lb (87 kg)

Career information
- High school: Xenia Christian (Xenia, Ohio)
- College: Liberty (2005–2009)
- WNBA draft: 2009: 2nd round, 14th overall pick
- Drafted by: San Antonio Silver Stars
- Playing career: 2009–2010
- Position: Forward
- Number: 40

Career history
- 2009–2010: San Antonio Silver Stars

Career highlights
- 2× Big South Player of the Year (2008, 2009); 3× First-team All-Big South (2007–2009)
- Stats at WNBA.com
- Stats at Basketball Reference

Megan Frazee Leuzinger (born March 29, 1987) is an American professional basketball player. Frazee graduated from Liberty University and played briefly in the Women's National Basketball Association (WNBA). She most recently played for Samsun of the Turkish Women's League, where she averaged 18.7 points and 7.4 rebounds per game. On April 11, 2018, she was named head coach of the Evangel University women's basketball team.

== Early life ==
Frazee was born in Laredo, Texas. She graduated in 2005 from Xenia Christian High School in Xenia, Ohio, where she helped lead the school to a final four appearance. She was named the Ohio Division 4 player of the year, first team all-state, and was tabbed a Street & Smith's Honorable Mention honoree.

== College ==
Frazee played for coach Carey Green at Liberty University in Lynchburg, Virginia, where she was a teammate with her triplet sisters Moriah and Molly. She was a three-time All-Big South first team selection, was twice named Big South Conference player of the year, and was the Big South Women's Student-Athlete of the Year as a junior. As a senior, she was named to the Associated Press honorable mention All-American team as well as the CoSIDA/ESPN Academic All-America First Team, graduating with a 3.91 GPA in Kinesiology. Frazee was invited to tryouts for the 2007 national team during her sophomore summer and spent time during the summer of 2008 traveling in North Africa with Athletes in Action.

During her senior season Megan averaged 19.8 points and 9.9 rebounds per game, leading Liberty to the NCAA women's basketball tournament. She possesses career averages at Liberty of 18.5 points and 9.9 rebounds per game. The Flames also qualified for the NCAA tournament during her freshman and sophomore seasons. Her freshman season was cut short to 14 games due to a season ending knee injury.

== Career statistics ==
Legend
GP	Games played	GS	Games started	MPG	Minutes per game	RPG	Rebounds per game
APG	Assists per game	SPG	Steals per game	BPG	Blocks per game	PPG	Points per game
TO	Turnovers per game	FG%	Field-goal percentage	3P%	3-point field-goal percentage	FT%	Free-throw percentage
**Bold**	Career best	°	League leader

=== WNBA career statistics ===
==== Regular season ====
Year	Team	GP	GS	MPG	FG%	3P%	FT%	RPG	APG	SPG	BPG	TO	PPG
2009	San Antonio	**29**	0	**11.2**	**41.3**	**37.8**	**69.2**	**2.9**	**0.5**	**0.3**	**0.2**	0.7	**5.0**
2010	San Antonio	10	0	10.1	37.5	11.1	68.4	2.1	0.1	0.0	0.0	**0.6**	3.8
Career	2 years, 1 team	39	0	10.9	40.5	32.6	69.0	2.7	0.4	0.2	0.1	0.7	4.7

==== Playoffs ====
Year	Team	GP	GS	MPG	FG%	3P%	FT%	RPG	APG	SPG	BPG	TO	PPG
2009	San Antonio	1	0	7.0	0.0	0.0	100.0	0.0	0.0	0.0	0.0	0.0	2.0
Career	1 years, 1 team	1	0	7.0	0.0	0.0	100.0	0.0	0.0	0.0	0.0	0.0	2.0

=== College career statistics ===
Legend
GP	Games played	GS	Games started	MPG	Minutes per game
FG%	Field goal percentage	3P%	3-point field goal percentage	FT%	Free throw percentage
RPG	Rebounds per game	APG	Assists per game	SPG	Steals per game
BPG	Blocks per game	PPG	Points per game	**Bold**	Career high

Year	Team	GP	Points	FG%	3P%	FT%	RPG	APG	SPG	BPG	PPG
2005–06	Liberty	14	259	47.3	52.8	72.9	9.8	**2.7**	0.8	0.9	18.5
2006–07	Liberty	31	533	48.8	41.0	77.2	8.5	1.6	1.2	0.4	17.2
2007–08	Liberty	**32**	**595**	50.4	35.1	**87.8**	9.5	2.7	**1.4**	**0.8**	18.6
2008–09	Liberty	25	496	**52.1**	**43.5**	79.2	**9.9**	2.4	1.1	0.6	**19.8**
Career	Liberty	102	1883	49.9	42.1	80.5	9.3	2.3	1.2	0.6	18.5

== Professional career ==
Frazee was drafted as a forward by the San Antonio Silver Stars in the second round of the 2009 WNBA draft. She was the 14th player taken overall. During her rookie season she played in 29 games and averaged 5.0 points and 2.9 rebounds.

Following that first WNBA season she played in the Turkish Women's League for Çankaya Üniversitesi, where she averaged 19.0 points, 12.0 rebounds, 1.8 assists, 1.0 steals, and 36.3 minutes per game. Frazee suffered a meniscus tear to her left knee in practice on June 25, 2010. A successful repair on the knee was performed on July 1. She was waived by the Silver Stars on June 29, 2010.

Frazee has played for the following clubs in recent seasons:

- 2010–11 – Botas (Turkish Women's League);
- 2011–12 – CCC Polkowice (Polish League);
- 2012–13 – Samsun (Turkish Women's League);
- 2013–14 – Ramat HaSharon (Israel – D1); alongside Jacqui Kalin and Laine Selwyn.
