= 2009 WNBA season =

- League: Women's National Basketball Association
- Sport: Basketball
- Duration: June 6 – October 9, 2009
- Games: 34
- Teams: 13
- Total attendance: 1,776,536
- Average attendance: 8,039
- TV partner(s): ABC, ESPN, NBA TV

Draft
- Top draft pick: (United States) Angel McCoughtry
- Picked by: Atlanta Dream

Regular season
- Top seed: Phoenix Mercury
- Season MVP: (Argentina) / (United States) Diana Taurasi (Phoenix)
- Top scorer: (Argentina) / (United States) Diana Taurasi (Phoenix)

Playoffs
- Finals champions: Phoenix Mercury
- Runners-up: Indiana Fever
- Finals MVP: (Argentina) / (United States) Diana Taurasi (Phoenix)

WNBA seasons
- ← 2008 2010 →

The 2009 WNBA season was the 13th season of the Women's National Basketball Association. It was the first WNBA season without a Houston franchise, the Comets having folded in December 2008 until 2026 when Connecticut Sun were relocated to Houston to bring back the Comets franchise beginning in 2027. The season ended with the Phoenix Mercury winning their second championship in three years.

The regular season began with a televised (ABC) meeting between the defending champion Detroit Shock and the Los Angeles Sparks in Los Angeles on June 6. The Connecticut Sun hosted the 9th Annual All-Star Game which was broadcast live on ABC (HD) on July 25.

== 2008–2009 WNBA offseason ==
- The new television deal with ESPN will begin during the 2009 season. For the first time ever, teams will be paid rights fees as part of this deal.
- As of the 2009 season, the maximum roster size per team is reduced from 13 to 11. Any team that falls below nine players able to play due to injury, pregnancy or any other factor outside of the control of the team will, upon request, be granted a roster hardship exception allowing the team to sign an additional player or players so that the team will have nine players able to play in an upcoming game or games. As soon as the injured (or otherwise sidelined) player(s) is able to play, the roster hardship player(s) -- not any other player on the roster—must be waived.
- On October 23, 2008, Angela Taylor was named general manager of the Washington Mystics.
- On November 6, 2008, Julie Plank was named head coach of the Washington Mystics.
- On November 20, 2008, Bill Laimbeer was signed to a two-year contract extension as the head coach and general manager of the Detroit Shock.
- On December 1, 2008, the Houston Comets ceased basketball operations.
- On January 5, 2009, the free agent signing period began.
- On February 3, 2009, president Donna Orender announced that the 2009 WNBA All-Star Game is in Connecticut, hosted by the Sun.
- On April 28, 2009, Anne Donovan was named assistant coach of the New York Liberty.
- The WNBA announced the addition of the WNBA LiveAccess system on May 13, 2009. This new feature on WNBA.com will provide fans with free access to more than 200 live game webcasts – the league's most comprehensive offering – throughout the 2009 WNBA season. For the first time, fans around the world will be able to access live game webcasts on individual team web sites. All of the WNBA LiveAccess games will then be archived for on-demand viewing.
- On June 1, 2009, Donna Orender and David Stern announced that the Phoenix Mercury had signed a corporate deal with LifeLock. This would allow the LifeLock name to be on the team uniforms and the court, among other things. This was the first deal of the type in WNBA or NBA history.
- On June 3, 2009, Minnesota Lynx head coach Don Zierden resigned to take an assistant job with Flip Saunders and the Washington Wizards. Assistant coach Jennifer Gillom was promoted to head coach of the Lynx.
- On June 5, 2009, the Los Angeles Sparks signed a corporate deal with Farmers Insurance. This would allow the Farmers Insurance name to be on the team uniforms and the court, among other things. This was the second deal of the type in WNBA or NBA history (after the Mercury).

== Houston Comets dispersal draft ==
On December 8, 2008, the Houston Comets dispersal draft was held. Five former Comets players, Latasha Byears, Mwadi Mabika, Hamchetou Maiga-Ba, Michelle Snow, and Tina Thompson were free agents and therefore not eligible for this draft. Teams selected based inversely on their 2008 regular season records. Six of the thirteen teams making selections waived their picks.

The top four picks were:

Pick	Player	Nationality	New Team	Ref.
1	Sancho Lyttle	Saint Vincent and the Grenadines	Atlanta Dream	
2	Matee Ajavon	United States	Washington Mystics	
3	Mistie Bass	United States	Chicago Sky	
4	Roneeka Hodges	United States	Minnesota	

== Draft ==
The WNBA Draft lottery was held on December 9, 2008. The Atlanta Dream received the first overall selection. The Washington Mystics received the number two selection. The Chicago Sky came up with the third overall selection, followed by the Minnesota Lynx at four and the Phoenix Mercury at number five. For the first time in WNBA history, the lottery balls were chosen exactly according to odds.

The 2009 WNBA Draft was held on April 9 in Secaucus, New Jersey. Coverage of the first round was shown on ESPN2 (in HD for the first time ever) at 3:00pm. Second and third round coverage was shown on ESPNU and NBA TV at 4:00pm.

The top draft picks were as follows:

1. Angel McCoughtry, Atlanta Dream
2. Marissa Coleman, Washington Mystics
3. Kristi Toliver, Chicago Sky
4. Renee Montgomery, Minnesota Lynx
5. DeWanna Bonner, Phoenix Mercury

== Season summary ==
=== Season highlights ===
- On June 15, 2009, only three games into the Detroit Shock season, seven-year head coach and general manager Bill Laimbeer announced his resignation. Rick Mahorn was promoted to head coach, and Cheryl Reeve took over GM duties.
- On July 5, 2009, reigning MVP Candace Parker returned to the court for the first time since giving birth just 53 days earlier.
- On July 12, 2009, Sacramento Monarchs general manager John Whisenant announced that head coach Jenny Boucek would be relieved of her duties after a 3–10 start to the season. Whisenant took over the position while maintaining his GM duties.
- On July 31, 2009, New York Liberty general manager Carol Blazejowski announced that Pat Coyle would be fired as the head coach after a 6–11 start to the season. Assistant coach Anne Donovan took over the job on an interim basis.
- On August 10, 2009, Los Angeles Sparks center Lisa Leslie recorded her 6,000th career point in her team's win against the Indiana Fever. Leslie was the first player in WNBA history to reach the 6,000 point plateau.
- On August 15, 2009, Seattle Storm forward Lauren Jackson recorded her 5,000th career point in her team's loss against the Atlanta Dream. Jackson was the fourth player to reach the 5,000 point plateau; she was, however, the fastest and the youngest to do so.
- On August 17, the Chicago Sky announced a change of home venue, effective with the 2010 season. The team would abandon their original home of UIC Pavilion on the campus of the University of Illinois at Chicago and move to Allstate Arena in suburban Rosemont.
- The Phoenix Mercury averaged a league-best (and highest in WNBA history) 92.8 points per game. Fixed for a 48-minute game (111.4 points per game), the Mercury's average surpassed the highest scoring team in the WNBA.
- The Phoenix Mercury shot 85.5% from the free-throw line. This clip is the best team free-throw percentage in WNBA and NBA history.
- On September 25, 2009, NBA legend Larry Bird purchased about 9,000 balcony tickets to the Indiana Fever vs. Detroit Shock game three of the Eastern Conference Finals. The tickets were then distributed at the Fever box office free-of-charge to fans. Bird had the sole intent of filling the arena to support the Fever, who had never advanced to the WNBA Finals. Announced attendance at the game was 18,165 and the Fever beat the Shock.
- On September 28, 2009, Phoenix Suns general manager Steve Kerr purchased about 7,000 balcony tickets to the Phoenix Mercury vs. Indiana Fever game one of the 2009 WNBA Finals. The tickets were then distributed at the Mercury box office free-of-charge to fans. Kerr wanted to follow up Bird's similar action stating that he knows how important a large crowd can be in a Finals series.

=== End-of-season business report ===
- The WNBA's regular season on ESPN2 (13 telecasts) concluded with an average of 269,000 viewers, up 8% vs. 2008 season (248,000 viewers). In addition, regular-season games on ESPN2 saw increases in key demographics, including men 18-34 (+9%), men 18-49 (+14%) and men 23-54 (+23%).
- Ratings and viewership for Game 1 of the WNBA Finals on ESPN2 were up 39 percent (.43 rating vs. .31 rating for Game 1 of the '08 WNBA Finals) and 59 percent respectively (555,000 viewers vs. 348,000 viewers), making Game 1 the most viewed WNBA game on cable since Game 4 of the '07 WNBA Finals (Shock vs. Mercury) on ESPN2 (669,000).

== Regular season ==
=== Standings ===
Eastern Conference	W	L	PCT	GB	Home	Road	Conf.
Indiana Fever ^{x}	22	12	.647	–	14–3	8–9	17–5
Atlanta Dream ^{x}	18	16	.529	4.0	12–5	6–11	10–12
Detroit Shock ^{x}	18	16	.529	4.0	11–6	7–10	11–11
Washington Mystics ^{x}	16	18	.471	6.0	11–6	5–12	10–12
Chicago Sky ^{o}	16	18	.471	6.0	12–5	4–13	10–12
Connecticut Sun ^{o}	16	18	.471	6.0	12–5	4–13	9–12
New York Liberty ^{o}	13	21	.382	9.0	8–9	5–12	8–13

Western Conference	W	L	PCT	GB	Home	Road	Conf.
Phoenix Mercury ^{x}	23	11	.676	–	12–5	11–6	13–7
Seattle Storm ^{x}	20	14	.588	3.0	13–4	7–10	13–7
Los Angeles Sparks ^{x}	18	16	.529	5.0	11–6	7–10	11–9
San Antonio Silver Stars ^{x}	15	19	.441	8.0	10–7	5–12	10–10
Minnesota Lynx ^{o}	14	20	.412	9.0	9–8	5–12	7–13
Sacramento Monarchs ^{o}	12	22	.353	11.0	7–10	5–12	6–14

=== All-Star Game ===
The 2009 WNBA All-Star Game was hosted by the Connecticut Sun on July 25 at Mohegan Sun Arena. Coverage of the game began at 3:30pm on ABC. This marked the second time the Sun had hosted the annual event.

ABC (HD)

July 25
3:30 p.m.

Western Conference 130, Eastern Conference 118
Scoring by quarter: 25-27, 38-33, 36-33, 31-25
Pts: Swin Cash (22); Rebs: Cappie Pondexter (9); Asts: Sue Bird (10)	Pts: Sylvia Fowles (17); Rebs: Érika de Souza (9); Asts: Asjha Jones (6)

Mohegan Sun Arena, Uncasville, Connecticut
Attendance: 9,518
Referees:
1. 44 Felicia Grinter, #42 Roy Gulbeyan, #53 Jeff Smith

=== Statistic leaders ===
The following shows the leaders for each statistic during the 2009 regular season.

Category	Player	Team	Statistic
Points per game	Diana Taurasi	Phoenix Mercury	20.4
Rebounds per game	Candace Parker	Los Angeles Sparks	9.8
Assists per game	Sue Bird	Seattle Storm	5.8
Steals per game	Tamika Catchings	Indiana Fever	2.91
Blocks per game	Candace Parker	Los Angeles Sparks	2.12
Field goal percentage	Sylvia Fowles	Chicago Sky	.599 (103–172)
Three point FG percentage	Tangela Smith	Phoenix Mercury	.452 (42–93)
Free throw percentage	Nicole Powell	Sacramento Monarchs	.979 (94–96)
Points per game	Team Stat	Phoenix Mercury	92.82
Least points allowed	Team Stat	Seattle Storm	72.82
Field goal percentage	Team Stat	Phoenix Mercury	.460
Least FG% allowed	Team Stat	Los Angeles Sparks	.399

=== Schedule ===
2009 WNBA Preseason
Preseason

Date	Time	Matchup			TV	Result	High points	High rebounds	High assists	Location/Attendance
Thu April 9	3:00	2009 WNBA draft: First round			ESPN2 (HD)					Secaucus, New Jersey
Thu April 9	4:00	2009 WNBA draft: Later rounds			ESPNU, NBA TV					Secaucus, New Jersey
Thu May 21	11:00am	Washington	@	New York		77-71; NYL	Sanford (17)	Sanford (8)	Carson (4)	Madison Square Garden; 15,958
Thu May 21	10:00	Sacramento	@	Seattle		64-55; SEA	Powell (15)	5 players (5)	Atkinson (4)	KeyArena; 4,875
Fri May 22	7:00	New York	@	Connecticut		74-62; CON	Jones (11)	Black (7)	4 players (3)	Mohegan Sun Arena; 5,578
Fri May 22	8:30	Detroit	@	Chicago		71-67; CHI	Fowles (21)	Miller (10)	DeLaHoussaye, Perkins (5)	UIC Pavilion; 3,283
Sat May 23	1:00	Indiana	@	Minnesota		68-51; IND	Douglas (19)	Pringle (6)	Catchings, January, Montgomery (3)	Claire Lynch Hall; 475
Wed May 27	11:00am	Chicago	@	Detroit		78-68; DET	Zellous (18)	Zellous (8)	Smith (5)	Palace of Auburn Hills; 3,952
Wed May 27	2:00	Phoenix	@	Sacramento		74-70; PHO	Quigley (15)	Harper (9)	Quigley (4)	ARCO Arena; 6,339
Wed May 27	7:30	Connecticut	@	Atlanta		76-73; ATL	Phillips (18)	de Souza (9)	Teasley (7)	Philips Arena; 4,980
Thu May 28	11:30am	New York	@	Washington		74-56; WAS	Ajavon (17)	Vaughn (7)	Ajavon (3)	Verizon Center; 9,287
Thu May 28	7:00	Chicago	@	Indiana		74-67; IND	Douglas, Dupree, Chen (15)	Ely (8)	Dupree (3)	Conseco Fieldhouse; 6,457
Sat May 30	7:00	San Antonio	@	Detroit		62-55; DET	Young (14)	Mattera (8)	Johnson (4)	Traverse City West H.S. 2,109
Sat May 30	10:00	Seattle	@	Phoenix		61-58; PHO	Wright (16)	Walker (12)	Pondexter (6)	US Airways Center; 2,421
Sun May 31	3:00	Los Angeles	@	Connecticut		80-77; LAS	Thompson (14)	Littles (8)	Lennox (4)	Mohegan Sun Arena; 6,630
Tue June 2	8:00	E-League	@	Chicago		102-55; CHI	Dupree (20)	Alexander (8)	Toliver (6)	UIC Pavilion; 3,488
Tue June 2	10:00	Indiana	@	San Antonio		67-60; IND	Catchings (16)	Frazee (8)	Catchings (4)	Austin Convention Center

2009 WNBA Regular Season
June

Date	Time	Matchup			TV	Result	High points	High rebounds	High assists	Location/Attendance
Sat 6	2:30	Detroit	@	Los Angeles	ABC (HD)	78-58; LAS	Thompson (18)	Lennox (10)	Harrower (7)	Staples Center; 13,154
Sat 6	4:00	Seattle	@	Sacramento		71-61; SEA	Jackson (23)	Harper, Little (6)	Bird (8)	ARCO Arena; 14,824
Sat 6	4:00	Washington	@	Connecticut		82-70; WAS	Jones (22)	Sanford, Langhorne (7)	Harding (7)	Mohegan Sun Arena; 7,191
Sat 6	7:00	Indiana	@	Atlanta		87-86 (2OT); ATL	Holdsclaw (23)	de Souza (17)	January (5)	Philips Arena; 8,709
Sat 6	8:00	Chicago	@	Minnesota	NBA TV; FSN-N	102-85; MIN	Perkins (24)	Perkins (6)	Anosike (8)	Target Center; 8,708
Sat 6	10:00	San Antonio	@	Phoenix	NBA TV; KMYS	90-79; PHO	Taurasi, Young (25)	Riley (13)	Johnson (9)	US Airways Center; 13,582
Sun 7	4:00	Connecticut	@	New York	WCTX	66-57; CON	Whalen (14)	Whalen (12)	Battle, Mitchell (3)	Madison Square Garden; 13,397
Sun 7	4:00	Atlanta	@	Washington		77-71; WAS	Beard (27)	Langhorne (8)	Harding (7)	Verizon Center; 11,759
Sun 7	7:00	Minnesota	@	Indiana	FSI	96-74; MIN	Houston (23)	Griffith (7)	Houston, White (4)	Conseco Fieldhouse; 9,234
Sun 7	9:00	Sacramento	@	Seattle	FSN-NW	80-70; SEA	Jackson (25)	Powell, Lawson (7)	Bird (8)	KeyArena; 9,686
Mon 8	7:30	Los Angeles	@	Detroit		81-52; DET	Nolan (27)	Thompson (11)	5 players (3)	Palace of Auburn Hills; 13,915
Tue 9	7:00	Seattle	@	Indiana	ESPN2 (HD)	73-66; IND	Jackson (21)	Sutton-Brown (10)	Bird (5)	Conseco Fieldhouse; 7,253
Wed 10	7:30	Washington	@	Detroit		75-69; WAS	Beard (15)	Melvin (9)	Nolan (6)	Palace of Auburn Hills; 7,329
Wed 10	8:00	Los Angeles	@	Minnesota		87-76; MIN	Augustus (30)	Augustus (9)	Anosike, Miller (5)	Target Center; 7,444
Wed 10	10:00	New York	@	Phoenix		91-84; PHO	Pondexter (26)	Kraayeveld, Vaughn (7)	McCarville (6)	US Airways Center; 5,080
Fri 12	7:00	Los Angeles	@	Indiana		73-61; IND	Leslie (21)	Leslie (13)	Catchings, Douglas (5)	Conseco Fieldhouse; 9,320
Fri 12	8:00	Seattle	@	Minnesota		88-71; SEA	Jackson (22)	Jackson (11)	Bird (9)	Target Center; 6,423
Fri 12	8:30	Atlanta	@	Chicago	NBA TV; CN100	81-73; CHI	Dupree (23)	de Souza, Dupree (8)	Perkins (8)	UIC Pavilion; 5,689
Fri 12	10:00	Phoenix	@	Sacramento		90-71; SAC	Powell (19)	Harper, Paris (8)	Lawson, Pondexter (4)	ARCO Arena; 6,438
Sat 13	8:00	New York	@	San Antonio	NBA TV; MSG; KMYS	63-60; SAN	Christon (21)	McCarville (9)	Hammon (4)	AT&T Center; 10,572
Sat 13	10:00	Sacramento	@	Phoenix		115-104 (OT); PHO	Taurasi (31)	Powell (9)	Johnson, Lawson (8)	US Airways Center; 7,173
Sun 14	3:00	Atlanta	@	Connecticut		67-62; ATL	Lyttle (20)	Lyttle (15)	Teasley, Whalen (5)	Mohegan Sun Arena; 6,429
Sun 14	6:00	Seattle	@	Chicago		64-57; CHI	Jackson (22)	Fowles (15)	Wright (4)	UIC Pavilion; 2,681
Tue 16	8:00	Connecticut	@	Chicago		78-75; CHI	Perkins (25)	Fowles (10)	Whalen (8)	UIC Pavilion; 2,396
Tue 16	10:00	Minnesota	@	Sacramento		86-83; MIN	Augustus (30)	Harper (9)	Wiggins (6)	ARCO Arena; 7,736
Wed 17	10:00	Minnesota	@	Phoenix		104-80; PHO	Taurasi (28)	Anosike, Bonner (10)	Pondexter (9)	US Airways Center; 6,524
Fri 19	7:00	Chicago	@	Connecticut		91-61; CON	Jones (17)	Gardin (11)	Gardin (7)	Mohegan Sun Arena; 5,892
Fri 19	7:30	San Antonio	@	New York	NBA TV; MSG	77-61; NYL	McCarville (18)	Young (7)	Christon (6)	Madison Square Garden; 8,046
Fri 19	7:30	Indiana	@	Detroit		66-54; IND	Catchings (15)	Hornbuckle, McWilliams (10)	Catchings (4)	Palace of Auburn Hills; 7,725
Fri 19	7:30	Washington	@	Atlanta		93-81; ATL	Beard, Lyttle (20)	Lyttle (13)	Currie, Hardin (7)	Philips Arena; 6,050
Fri 19	10:00	Los Angeles	@	Phoenix		89-80; PHO	Pondexter (21)	Thompson (14)	Johnson (7)	US Airways Center; 8,255
Fri 19	10:00	Minnesota	@	Seattle		90-62; SEA	Jackson (26)	Anosike (7)	Bird (10)	KeyArena; 7,607
Sat 20	7:00	Chicago	@	Washington		81-72; WAS	Beard (31)	Melvin (9)	Perkins (6)	Verizon Center; 11,745
Sun 21	3:00	San Antonio	@	Connecticut	NBA TV; WCTX	71-58; CON	Young (22)	Black (8)	Darling (4)	Mohegan Sun Arena; 6,928
Sun 21	3:00	New York	@	Atlanta		93-81; NYL	Christon, Holdsclaw (17)	Lyttle (9)	Moore (8)	Philips Arena; 5,624
Sun 21	6:00	Detroit	@	Indiana	NBA TV; FSI	82-70; IND	Douglas (23)	Sutton-Brown (9)	Catchings, Nolan (6)	Conseco Fieldhouse; 7,610
Sun 21	7:00	Seattle	@	Phoenix	NBA TV; FSNA	93-84; SEA	Jackson, Taurasi (25)	Jackson (8)	Bird (9)	US Airways Center; 6,181
Sun 21	9:30	Sacramento	@	Los Angeles	NBA TV; FSNW	67-47; LAS	Powell (13)	Walker (9)	Bobbitt (5)	Staples Center; 9,494
Tue 23	12:00	Chicago	@	Atlanta		99-98 (OT); CHI	McCoughtry (26)	Dupree (10)	McCoughtry (8)	Philips Arena; 10,351
Tue 23	9:30	Phoenix	@	San Antonio	ESPN2 (HD)	91-87; SAN	Pondexter (26)	Taurasi, Young (8)	Johnson, Young (5)	AT&T Center; 6,692
Tue 23	8:00	New York	@	Minnesota		69-57; MIN	Christon, Wiggins (25)	Hollingsworth (7)	Wiggins (5)	Target Center; 5,620
Thu 25	7:00	Phoenix	@	Washington		93-87; PHO	Pondexter (24)	Langhorne (12)	Harding (9)	Verizon Center; 9,808
Fri 26	7:00	Indiana	@	New York		82-81 (OT); IND	Douglas (24)	Hoffman (14)	L. Moore (6)	Madison Square Garden; 9,304
Fri 26	7:30	Detroit	@	Atlanta		96-86; ATL	Holdsclaw (28)	de Souza (13)	Teasley (11)	Philips Arena; 5,935
Fri 26	8:00	Sacramento	@	San Antonio		62-52; SAN	Hammon (26)	Young (10)	Hammon (6)	AT&T Center; 7,973
Fri 26	10:00	Los Angeles	@	Seattle		69-67; SEA	Jackson (32)	Jackson, Wright (8)	Bird, Lennox (5)	KeyArena; 9,686
Sat 27	7:00	Atlanta	@	Connecticut		82-68; CON	Jones (24)	Jones (12)	Whalen (5)	Mohegan Sun Arena; 6,264
Sat 27	7:00	New York	@	Indiana	MSG	63-54; IND	Carson, Hoffman (14)	Catchings (11)	Catchings (4)	Conseco Fieldhouse; 8,481
Sat 27	8:00	Phoenix	@	Minnesota	NBA TV; FSN-N; FSNA	109-80; MIN	Hodges, Wiggins (22)	Anosike, Taurasi (8)	Miller (8)	Target Center; 5,911
Sat 27	8:00	Washington	@	Chicago		68-63; CHI	Dupree (23)	Fowles (10)	Harding (6)	UIC Pavilion; 3,918
Sun 28	6:00	Sacramento	@	Detroit		86-72; DET	Zellous (18)	Ford (8)	Penicheiro (5)	Palace of Auburn Hills; 7,277
Sun 28	9:30	Seattle	@	Los Angeles	NBA TV; FSNW	82-55; LAS	Ferdinand-Harris (15)	Cash (5)	Harrower (5)	Staples Center; 10,797
Tue 30	7:00	Minnesota	@	Atlanta	ESPN2 (HD)	91-85; MIN	Castro Marques (31)	Anosike (12)	Anosike, Houston, Lehning, Wiggins (4)	Philips Arena; 7,686
Tue 30	8:00	Washington	@	San Antonio		84-82; WAS	Young (21)	Currie (8)	Darling (6)	AT&T Center; 4,723
Tue 30	8:00	Sacramento	@	Chicago		74-72; CHI	Powell (21)	Fowles (14)	Perkins (8)	UIC Pavilion; 2,721

July

Date	Time	Matchup			TV	Result	High points	High rebounds	High assists	Location/Attendance
Wed 1	10:00	Seattle	@	Phoenix		91-83; PHO	Pondexter, Taurasi (22)	Pondexter (11)	Pondexter (8)	US Airways Center; 6,341
Thu 2	7:00	Connecticut	@	Indiana	NBA TV; FSI	67-53; IND	Douglas, Sutton-Brown (14)	Sutton-Brown (14)	Catchings (5)	Conseco Fieldhouse; 6,468
Thu 2	7:30	Detroit	@	New York	NBA TV; MSG	80-64; NYL	Christon (25)	Ford, Hornbuckle (10)	McCarville, Smith (5)	Madison Square Garden; 8,018
Thu 2	8:00	Sacramento	@	Minnesota	FSN-N	74-68; SAC	Powell (21)	Anosike, Brunson (8)	Anosike (7)	Target Center; 6,920
Fri 3	7:30	Washington	@	Atlanta		72-65; ATL	Holdsclaw (18)	Melvin (9)	Holdsclaw (8)	Philips Arena; 5,456
Fri 3	8:00	Chicago	@	San Antonio		85-72; SAN	Young (19)	Riley, Young (8)	Hammon (10)	AT&T Center; 6,662
Sun 5	6:00	Connecticut	@	Detroit		95-92 (OT); CON	Smith (28)	Hornbuckle (12)	Jones, McWilliams (5)	Palace of Auburn Hills; 6,981
Sun 5	6:00	Atlanta	@	Indiana		78-74; IND	Sutton-Brown (22)	Catchings, Sutton-Brown (9)	Catchings (5)	Conseco Fieldhouse; 7,024
Sun 5	9:30	Phoenix	@	Los Angeles	NBA TV; FSNW; FSNA	104-89; PHO	Pondexter (21)	Bonner (10)	Bobbitt, Taurasi (6)	Staples Center; 9,872
Tue 7	3:00	San Antonio	@	Seattle		66-53; SEA	Cash (18)	Cash, Jackson (12)	Hammon (5)	KeyArena; 10,137
Tue 7	7:30	Connecticut	@	Atlanta		72-67; ATL	Holdsclaw (19)	de Souza (17)	Lehning (7)	Philips Arena; 6,225
Tue 7	8:00	Washington	@	Minnesota		96-94 (OT); MIN	Harding (27)	Currie (11)	Anosike, Currie, Miller (4)	Target Center; 7,171
Tue 7	10:00	Chicago	@	Sacramento		83-73; SAC	Perkins (21)	Brunson (10)	Lawson, Penicheiro, Perkins (6)	ARCO Arena; 5,672
Wed 8	10:00	Chicago	@	Phoenix		90-70; PHO	Dupree, Taurasi (22)	T. Smith (13)	Pondexter (6)	US Airways Center; 5,597
Thu 9	7:30	Los Angeles	@	New York	MSG	69-60; LAS	Lennox (20)	Thompson (8)	Harrower, Ferdinand-Harris, McCarville (3)	Madison Square Garden; 12,247
Thu 9	9:00	Sacramento	@	Seattle	ESPN2 (HD)	66-55; SEA	Cash (18)	Powell (8)	Wright (7)	KeyArena; 6,838
Fri 10	8:00	San Antonio	@	Minnesota		77-61; SAN	Young (21)	Anosike (12)	Lawson-Wade (4)	Target Center; 7,409
Fri 10	8:30	Indiana	@	Chicago		83-54; IND	Murphy (15)	Dupree (8)	Hoffman, January (6)	UIC Pavilion; 4,021
Sat 11	7:00	Los Angeles	@	Washington		75-63; WAS	Beard (26)	Langhorne (11)	Harding (5)	Verizon Center; 12,217
Sat 11	7:00	Detroit	@	Connecticut	NBA TV; WCTX	79-77 (OT); DET	Smith (25)	Braxton (13)	Smith, Whalen (3)	Mohegan Sun Arena; 6,342
Sat 11	7:30	Atlanta	@	New York		71-69; NYL	Castro Marques, Christon (18)	Castro Marques, de Souza, Holdsclaw (8)	Castro Marques, Moore (6)	Madison Square Garden; 8,732
Sat 11	10:00	Phoenix	@	Sacramento		107-105; PHO	Pondexter, Powell (23)	Bonner, Brunson, Taurasi, Walker (8)	Pondexter (8)	ARCO Arena; 7,798
Sun 12	7:00	Minnesota	@	San Antonio	NBA TV; KMYS	83-76; MIN	Hammon, Houston (26)	Anosike, Houston, Young (8)	Hammon (5)	AT&T Center; 6,568
Sun 12	9:00	Chicago	@	Seattle	NBA TV; FSN-NW	86-81; CHI	Dupree (28)	Dupree, Jackson, Wright (7)	Toliver, Wright (7)	KeyArena; 6,796
Tue 14	7:00	Los Angeles	@	Connecticut	ESPN2 (HD)	82-71; CON	Jones (24)	Lennox (11)	Jones, Whalen (5)	Mohegan Sun Arena; 6,612
Wed 15	11:30am	San Antonio	@	Washington		79-78; SAN	Hammon (21)	Beard, Frazee, Langhorne (6)	Darling, Hammon (5)	Verizon Center; 17,220
Wed 15	1:00	Atlanta	@	Minnesota	NBA TV; FSN-N	91-77; ATL	Holdsclaw (28)	Houston (12)	Montgomery (7)	Target Center; 11,245
Wed 15	1:00	Chicago	@	Indiana		84-74; IND	Sutton-Brown (22)	Dupree (10)	Catchings, Douglas (8)	Conseco Fieldhouse; 10,050
Wed 15	3:30	Sacramento	@	Phoenix	NBA TV; FSNA	100-81; PHO	Powell (23)	Paris (9)	Pondexter (15)	US Airways Center; 11,590
Wed 15	10:00	Detroit	@	Seattle	NBA TV; FSN-NW	66-63; DET	Smith (19)	Ford (8)	Nolan (7)	KeyArena; 6,821
Fri 17	7:00	Atlanta	@	Indiana		84-79; IND	Douglas (25)	de Souza (14)	Bevilaqua (5)	Conseco Fieldhouse; 7,975
Fri 17	8:00	Connecticut	@	San Antonio		72-64; CON	Hammon (24)	Frazee, Young (9)	Jones, Whalen (5)	AT&T Center; 9,524
Fri 17	10:00	Seattle	@	Sacramento		69-56; SEA	Bird (20)	Little (9)	Bird (6)	ARCO Arena; 6,386
Sat 18	7:00	New York	@	Washington		68-67; WAS	Harding (23)	Harding (7)	Moore (9)	Verizon Center; 9,968
Sat 18	10:00	Detroit	@	Phoenix		97-90 (OT); PHO	Pondexter (26)	McWilliams (12)	Pondexter (8)	US Airways Center; 8,288
Sun 19	3:00	Indiana	@	Connecticut		67-61; CON	Douglas, Hoffman, Whalen (15)	Gruda (9)	Whalen (6)	Mohegan Sun Arena; 6,517
Sun 19	4:00	Atlanta	@	New York		89-86; NYL	Christon (32)	de Souza (10)	Mitchell (6)	Madison Square Garden; 8,560
Sun 19	6:00	San Antonio	@	Chicago	NBA TV; CN100	85-75; CHI	Perkins (29)	Dupree (11)	Canty (6)	UIC Pavilion; 3,282
Sun 19	8:00	Minnesota	@	Seattle		72-69; SEA	Little (18)	Anosike (11)	Bird, Johnson, Wright (4)	KeyArena; 6,912
Sun 19	9:00	Detroit	@	Sacramento		69-65; DET	McWilliams (21)	McWilliams (12)	5 players (3)	ARCO Arena; 7,538
Tue 21	7:00	Indiana	@	Washington		82-70; IND	Catchings (28)	Catchings (10)	Bevilaqua (8)	Verizon Center; 9,798
Wed 22	12:00	Atlanta	@	Detroit		98-95 (OT); ATL	Braxton (25)	Braxton, Snow (12)	Nolan (9)	Palace of Auburn Hills; 14,439
Wed 22	12:30	New York	@	Chicago		77-70; NYL	Fowles, Spencer (15)	Dupree (11)	Canty, Moore (4)	UIC Pavilion; 5,881
Wed 22	7:00	Sacramento	@	Connecticut		83-75; CON	Jones (28)	Harper (11)	Phillips (7)	Mohegan Sun Arena; 5,675
Wed 22	10:00	Minnesota	@	Phoenix		99-86; MIN	Pondexter (28)	Bonner (10)	Johnson (6)	US Airways Center; 7,360
Wed 22	10:00	Los Angeles	@	Seattle		98-87 (3OT); SEA	Bird (23)	Little (14)	Bird, Cash (5)	KeyArena; 7,154
Thu 23	12:30	Indiana	@	San Antonio		84-65; SAN	Young (24)	Frazee (8)	January (6)	AT&T Center; 9,985
Thu 23	7:00	Chicago	@	Washington	ESPN2 (HD)	75-64; WAS	Langhorne (16)	Langhorne (10)	Harding (6)	Verizon Center; 11,651
Thu 23	7:30	Sacramento	@	New York	MSG	88-74; SAC	Powell (32)	Powell, Walker (9)	Penicheiro (9)	Madison Square Garden; 8,845
Sat 25	3:30	West All-Stars	@	East All-Stars	ABC (HD)	130-118; WEST	Cash (22)	de Souza, Pondexter (9)	Bird (10)	Mohegan Sun Arena; 9,518
Sun 26	4:00	Phoenix	@	New York		94-88; PHO	Taurasi (34)	Taurasi (13)	Johnson (7)	Madison Square Garden; 11,211
Sun 26	4:00	Sacramento	@	Washington		87-73; WAS	Langhorne (19)	Langhorne (8)	Beard (5)	Verizon Center; 10,757
Tue 28	7:00	Washington	@	Indiana		85-81; IND	Douglas (34)	Hoffman (10)	Harding, Melvin (4)	Conseco Fieldhouse; 5,904
Tue 28	7:30	Phoenix	@	Connecticut	ESPN2 (HD)	95-80; PHO	Pondexter (29)	T. Smith, Taurasi (9)	Johnson (7)	Mohegan Sun Arena; 7,732
Tue 28	8:00	Seattle	@	San Antonio	KMYS	74-71; SAN	Hammon (24)	Cash (11)	Bird (5)	AT&T Center; 5,382
Tue 28	8:00	Los Angeles	@	Minnesota		76-70; LAS	Thompson (30)	Parker (10)	Hodges, Lennox, Thompson (4)	Target Center; 7,216
Wed 29	8:00	Los Angeles	@	Chicago		75-63; CHI	Perkins (18)	Parker (10)	Dupree (5)	UIC Pavilion; 5,633
Thu 30	2:30	San Antonio	@	Sacramento		101-93 (OT); SAC	Hammon (38)	Young (11)	Penicheiro (9)	ARCO Arena; 10,461
Thu 30	7:00	Connecticut	@	Indiana	FSI	94-85 (OT); IND	Douglas (32)	Gruda (10)	Bevilaqua (4)	Conseco Fieldhouse; 6,538
Thu 30	7:30	Washington	@	New York	NBA TV; MSG	78-75; WAS	Beard, McCarville (28)	Langhorne (11)	Harding (4)	Madison Square Garden; 10,172
Thu 30	7:30	Phoenix	@	Atlanta		106-76; ATL	McCoughtry (17)	de Souza (14)	Lehning (5)	Philips Arena; 7,827
Fri 31	7:30	Minnesota	@	Detroit		91-83; DET	Nolan (22)	Ford (9)	McWilliams, Nolan (6)	Palace of Auburn Hills; 9,314

August

Date	Time	Matchup			TV	Result	High points	High rebounds	High assists	Location/Attendance
Sat 1	7:00	New York	@	Atlanta	NBA TV; MSG	89-83; ATL	Christon (23)	Carson, Christon (8)	McCarville (6)	Philips Arena; 6,103
Sat 1	8:00	Phoenix	@	Minnesota		87-74; PHO	Taurasi (20)	Anosike (10)	Anosike, Willingham (5)	Target Center; 6,631
Sat 1	8:00	Connecticut	@	Chicago	NBA TV; WCTX	84-72; CHI	Dupree (23)	Dupree (8)	Canty, Jēkabsone-Žogota (6)	UIC Pavilion; 3,071
Sat 1	10:00	Los Angeles	@	Sacramento		59-56; LAS	Powell (18)	Parker (12)	Penicheiro (8)	ARCO Arena; 7,204
Sat 1	10:00	San Antonio	@	Seattle	NBA TV; KMYS	85-82 (OT); SEA	Jackson (23)	Jackson (13)	Bird (5)	KeyArena; 8,167
Sun 2	4:00	Indiana	@	Washington		87-79; IND	Douglas (24)	Catchings (9)	Catchings (5)	Verizon Center; 11,595
Sun 2	6:00	Connecticut	@	Detroit		83-65; CON	Whalen (22)	Ford (9)	Nolan, Whalen (4)	Palace of Auburn Hills; 7,814
Tue 4	3:00	San Antonio	@	Los Angeles		63-59; SAN	Hammon (20)	Thompson (12)	Hammon (5)	Staples Center; 13,865
Tue 4	7:30	New York	@	Detroit	ESPN2 (HD)	76-64; DET	Nolan (26)	Nolan (14)	McWilliams, Nolan, Smith (4)	Palace of Auburn Hills; 7,081
Tue 4	10:00	Phoenix	@	Seattle		101-90 (OT); PHO	Wright (25)	Cash, Jackson (11)	T. Johnson, Wright (7)	KeyArena; 6,728
Wed 5	7:00	Chicago	@	Indiana	NBA TV; CN100	76-67; IND	Dupree (19)	Dupree (13)	Canty (4)	Conseco Fieldhouse; 6,581
Thu 6	8:00	Atlanta	@	San Antonio		92-84; ATL	Hammon (26)	Lyttle (10)	Lehning (7)	AT&T Center; 5,042
Thu 6	10:30	Seattle	@	Los Angeles		79-75 (OT); LAS	Quinn (23)	Parker (13)	Bird, Wright (6)	Staples Center; 9,735
Fri 7	7:00	Detroit	@	Washington		70-66; WAS	Beard (15)	Langhorne (9)	Nolan (6)	Verizon Center; 10,637
Fri 7	8:00	Connecticut	@	Minnesota	NBA TV; FSN-N	95-88; MIN	Montgomery (24)	Anosike (12)	Jēkabsone-Žogota (7)	Target Center; 8,134
Fri 7	10:00	New York	@	Sacramento		84-66; NYL	Paris (19)	Brunson (7)	McCarville (5)	ARCO Arena; 6,284
Sat 8	7:00	Chicago	@	Atlanta		82-80; CHI	Thorn (20)	de Souza (15)	Perkins (5)	Philips Arena; 5,424
Sat 8	10:00	Indiana	@	Phoenix		90-83; IND	Douglas (28)	Douglas (10)	Swanier (6)	US Airways Center; 9,867
Sat 8	10:00	New York	@	Seattle		70-69; SEA	McCarville (22)	Christon, Jackson (9)	Bird (6)	KeyArena; 7,496
Sun 9	3:00	Washington	@	Connecticut		96-67; CON	Beard (18)	Holt (8)	Beard (6)	Mohegan Sun Arena; 6,528
Sun 9	6:00	Chicago	@	Detroit		64-58; DET	Zellous (19)	Fowles (18)	Smith (4)	Palace of Auburn Hills; 6,893
Sun 9	6:00	San Antonio	@	Minnesota		89-87; SAN	Anosike (24)	Hodges, Hollingsworth (8)	Hammon (9)	Target Center; 7,764
Mon 10	10:30	Indiana	@	Los Angeles		75-63; LAS	Leslie (21)	Leslie (11)	Milton-Jones (4)	Staples Center; 8,263
Tue 11	7:00	Detroit	@	Washington		81-77; DET	Nolan (23)	McWilliams (13)	Harding (8)	Verizon Center; 10,398
Tue 11	8:00	Sacramento	@	San Antonio		90-73; SAC	Brunson (19)	Brunson (9)	Penicheiro (11)	AT&T Center; 4,961
Tue 11	9:00	New York	@	Los Angeles	ESPN2 (HD)	65-61; NYL	Leslie (12)	Parker (11)	Christon, Moore (5)	Staples Center; 9,548
Thu 13	7:00	Seattle	@	Connecticut		64-53; CON	Gruda (14)	Jackson, Jones (10)	Whalen (7)	Mohegan Sun Arena; 6,983
Thu 13	7:30	Detroit	@	Atlanta		80-75; ATL	Nolan (20)	de Souza (13)	Lehning, McWilliams (5)	Philips Arena; 5,641
Thu 13	8:00	Indiana	@	Minnesota		91-81; IND	Hoffman (24)	Anosike (16)	Bevilaqua, Dixon (4)	Target Center; 7,156
Thu 13	10:00	San Antonio	@	Phoenix		95-83; PHO	Tauarsi, Young (29)	Wauters (10)	Hammon (8)	US Airways Center; 6,522
Fri 14	7:00	Connecticut	@	Washington		91-89 (2OT); WAS	Beard (26)	Langhorne (16)	Whalen (5)	Verizon Center; 9,738
Fri 14	7:30	Chicago	@	New York	NBA TV; CN100; MSG	88-77; CHI	Christon (25)	Christon (10)	Canty, Moore (6)	Madison Square Garden; 9,832
Fri 14	10:30	Sacramento	@	Los Angeles		85-79; SAC	Leslie (25)	Parker (10)	Penicheiro (10)	Staples Center; 10,122
Sat 15	7:00	Detroit	@	Indiana		82-59; IND	Douglas (19)	Braxton (10)	Douglas (4)	Conseco Fieldhouse; 9,963
Sat 15	7:00	Seattle	@	Atlanta		88-79; ATL	Jackson (25)	de Souza (12)	Bird (12)	Philips Arena; 8,751
Sat 15	8:00	Phoenix	@	San Antonio	NBA TV; KMYS; FSNA	106-89; SAN	Young (25)	Young (7)	Hammon (6)	AT&T Center; 8,933
Sat 15	8:00	Minnesota	@	Chicago		79-76; CHI	Hodges (25)	Dupree (14)	Canty (8)	UIC Pavilion; 3,877
Sat 15	10:00	Los Angeles	@	Sacramento		78-61; LAS	Powell (20)	Brunson (11)	Walker (5)	ARCO Arena; 7,646
Sun 16	4:00	New York	@	Washington		60-59; NYL	McCarville (19)	Langhorne (8)	Harding (7)	Verizon Center; 10,580
Tue 18	7:30	Seattle	@	Detroit		79-75; SEA	Jackson (36)	McWilliams (8)	Bird (8)	Palace of Auburn Hills; 7,392
Tue 18	8:00	Phoenix	@	Chicago		106-99; PHO	Taurasi (27)	Bonner (10)	Taurasi (7)	UIC Pavilion; TBA
Tue 18	10:30	Washington	@	Los Angeles		72-69; LAS	Leslie (20)	Parker (12)	Parker, Quinn (5)	Staples Center; 9,287
Wed 19	7:00	New York	@	Connecticut		74-69; CON	Whalen (20)	Whalen (10)	White (6)	Mohegan Sun Arena; 6,050
Wed 19	10:30	Minnesota	@	Los Angeles		78-63; LAS	Leslie (20)	Parker (10)	Quinn (7)	Staples Center; 9,181
Thu 20	7:30	San Antonio	@	Atlanta		93-87; ATL	McCoughtry (34)	de Souza (11)	Lehning (6)	Philips Arena; 5,848
Thu 20	10:00	Indiana	@	Sacramento		67-62; SAC	Douglas (21)	Brunson, Powell (10)	January, Penicheiro (6)	ARCO Arena; 6,290
Fri 21	7:30	Connecticut	@	New York	NBA TV; MSG	85-83 (OT); NYL	Gruda (24)	McCarville (13)	Whalen (7)	Madison Square Garden; 9,355
Fri 21	8:00	Los Angeles	@	San Antonio	NBA TV; KMYS	67-66 (OT); LAS	Young (31)	Parker, Thompson (12)	Hammon (6)	AT&T Center; 9,540
Fri 21	10:00	Washington	@	Phoenix		91-81; WAS	Langhorne (19)	Langhorne (12)	Harding, Pondexter (6)	US Airways Center; 9,155
Sat 22	7:00	Minnesota	@	Connecticut		98-94; CON	Gruda, Humphrey, Whalen, Wiggins (21)	Gruda (9)	Whalen (8)	Mohegan Sun Arena; 7,803
Sat 22	8:00	Detroit	@	Chicago		76-67; DET	Dupree (20)	Dupree (14)	4 players (4)	UIC Pavilion; 5,167
Sat 22	10:00	Washington	@	Sacramento		82-60; SAC	Powell (26)	Powell (11)	Penicheiro (5)	ARCO Arena; 7,067
Sat 22	10:00	Indiana	@	Seattle		74-60; SEA	Bird (16)	Cash (9)	Catchings (7)	KeyArena; 8,273
Sun 23	3:00	Los Angeles	@	Atlanta		91-87; LAS	Castro Marques (26)	de Souza (9)	Thompson (6)	Philips Arena; 11,304
Sun 23	4:00	Minnesota	@	New York		80-67; NYL	Christon (24)	Jackson, Wiggins (7)	Moore (6)	Madison Square Garden; 8,481
Sun 23	6:00	San Antonio	@	Detroit		99-84; DET	Smith (31)	McWilliams, Nolan (7)	Hornbuckle (7)	Palace of Auburn Hills; 7,130
Tue 25	7:00	Detroit	@	Connecticut		90-70; DET	Gruda, Smith (19)	Kelly (8)	Whalen (8)	Mohegan Sun Arena; 6,811
Tue 25	7:30	Sacramento	@	Atlanta		103-83; ATL	Castro Marques (30)	Lyttle (9)	Penicheiro (11)	Philips Arena; 5,159
Tue 25	10:00	Chicago	@	Los Angeles	ESPN2 (HD)	75-63; LAS	Leslie, Parker (21)	Parker (12)	Canty (4)	Staples Center; 9,615
Tue 25	10:00	Washington	@	Seattle		78-68; SEA	Burse (14)	Little (7)	Wright (6)	KeyArena; 6,791
Thu 27	7:00	San Antonio	@	Indiana	NBA TV; FSI	77-66; IND	Catchings (20)	Wauter (14)	Hammon (6)	Conseco Fieldhouse; 6,836
Thu 27	7:30	Atlanta	@	Detroit		87-83; DET	Nolan (29)	de Souza (13)	McCoughtry (5)	Palace of Auburn Hills; 5,695
Thu 27	10:00	Connecticut	@	Seattle		86-74; SEA	Bird (21)	Little (10)	Bird (7)	KeyArena; 6,588
Thu 27	10:30	Phoenix	@	Los Angeles	NBA TV; FSNW	98-90; PHO	Pondexter (26)	Bonner (9)	Quinn (8)	Staples Center; 9,586
Fri 28	8:00	Sacramento	@	Minnesota		100-95; MIN	Maiga-Ba (20)	Brunson (9)	Powell (6)	Target Center; 8,782
Fri 28	8:30	New York	@	Chicago	NBA TV; MSG; CN100	96-77; CHI	Dupree (26)	Vaughn (9)	Christon (6)	UIC Pavilion; 3,707
Sat 29	3:00	Detroit	@	San Antonio	ESPN2 (HD)	100-88 (OT); SAN	Nolan (34)	Wauters (11)	Hammon (9)	AT&T Center; 7,735
Sat 29	7:00	Sacramento	@	Indiana		79-78; SAC	Douglas (24)	Powell (11)	Bevilaqua (6)	Conseco Fieldhouse; 8,579
Sat 29	10:00	Connecticut	@	Phoenix	NBA TV; WCTX	95-84; PHO	Jēkabsone-Žogota (23)	Gardin (13)	Taurasi (5)	US Airways Center; 9,977
Sat 29	10:00	Atlanta	@	Seattle		91-84 (2OT); SEA	Wright (25)	Little (15)	Bird (8)	KeyArena; 9,089
Sun 30	4:00	Chicago	@	New York		77-63; NYL	Christon (18)	Dupree, Kraayeveld (13)	Thorn (7)	Madison Square Garden; 8,685
Sun 30	4:00	Minnesota	@	Washington		81-75; WAS	Houston (20)	Langhorne (10)	Harding (5)	Verizon Center; 12,241
Sun 30	9:30	Connecticut	@	Los Angeles	NBA TV; FSNW	91-81; LAS	Jēkabsone-Žogota, Thompson (21)	Parker (13)	Whalen (9)	Staples Center; 11,072

September

Date	Time	Matchup			TV	Result	High points	High rebounds	High assists	Location/Attendance
Tue 1	7:30	Seattle	@	New York		65-58; SEA	Little (17)	Little (13)	Moore (4)	Madison Square Garden; 8,469
Tue 1	7:30	Phoenix	@	Detroit		101-99; DET	Pondexter (25)	Ford (11)	Taurasi (6)	Palace of Auburn Hills; 5,239
Tue 1	8:00	Minnesota	@	San Antonio		84-82 (2OT); SAN	Hammon (29)	Anosike (11)	Hammon (5)	AT&T Center; 4,881
Tue 1	10:00	Connecticut	@	Sacramento		90-70; SAC	Brunson (32)	Brunson (13)	Powell (7)	ARCO Arena; 6,015
Tue 1	10:30	Atlanta	@	Los Angeles		84-79; ATL	Castro Marques (27)	Parker (14)	Lennox (5)	Staples Center; 8,756
Wed 2	7:00	Phoenix	@	Indiana	NBA TV; FSI	106-90; PHO	Catchings (27)	Catchings (12)	Johnson (6)	Conseco Fieldhouse; 7,446
Thu 3	7:00	Seattle	@	Washington		78-67; WAS	Bird, Currie (17)	Langhorne (11)	Bird (6)	Verizon Center; 10,648
Fri 4	7:00	New York	@	Connecticut	NBA TV; MSG	88-85 (OT); CON	Jēkabsone-Žogota (23)	Moore (8)	Whalen (7)	Mohegan Sun Arena; 6,685
Fri 4	7:30	Indiana	@	Detroit		70-63 (OT); DET	Nolan (22)	Catchings (13)	Nolan (4)	Palace of Auburn Hills; 7,230
Fri 4	8:30	Washington	@	Chicago		92-86; CHI	Ajavon (32)	Dupree, Langhorne (10)	Harding, Perkins (5)	UIC Pavilion; 3,241
Fri 4	10:00	Atlanta	@	Sacramento		98-90; ATL	de Souza (27)	de Souza (13)	McCoughtry (10)	ARCO Arena; 6,517
Sat 5	8:00	Los Angeles	@	San Antonio		89-72; SAN	Johnson (27)	Parker (10)	Lawson-Wade (11)	AT&T Center; 8,631
Sat 5	8:00	Seattle	@	Minnesota	NBA TV; FSN-N	76-68; MIN	Houston (22)	Little (8)	Houston, Johnson, Wright (4)	Target Center; 8,170
Sat 5	10:00	Atlanta	@	Phoenix		100-82; PHO	de Souza (23)	Bonner, Snow (7)	Lehning (10)	US Airways Center; 10,424
Sun 6	4:00	Washington	@	Indiana		72-61; IND	Catchings (20)	Sutton-Brown (11)	Hoffman (4)	Conseco Fieldhouse; 9,702
Sun 6	6:00	Chicago	@	Detroit		84-75; DET	Nolan (19)	Ely, Nolan (8)	Braxton, Hornbuckle, Nolan (4)	Palace of Auburn Hills; 6,619
Tue 8	7:30	Indiana	@	New York		69-63; IND	Carson, Catchings, Douglas (17)	Catchings (10)	Mitchell (6)	Madison Square Garden; 7,583
Tue 8	10:30	San Antonio	@	Los Angeles	NBA TV; KMYS	76-68; LAS	Leslie (18)	Parker (13)	Hammon (7)	Staples Center; 10,476
Wed 9	8:00	Detroit	@	Minnesota		75-72; MIN	Ford (16)	Ford (12)	Ford, Teasley, Zellous (4)	Target Center; 7,423
Thu 10	7:30	New York	@	Detroit	NBA TV; MSG	94-87 (OT); DET	Nolan (34)	Braxton, McWilliams (8)	Moore (6)	Palace of Auburn Hills; 8,178
Thu 10	8:00	Indiana	@	Chicago		86-79; CHI	Douglas (25)	Catchings (10)	Canty (6)	UIC Pavilion; 2,902
Thu 10	10:00	San Antonio	@	Sacramento		80-71; SAN	Hammon (27)	Powell (10)	Johnson, Lawson-Wade, Penicheiro (5)	ARCO Arena; 7,566
Thu 10	10:00	Phoenix	@	Seattle		92-84 (OT); PHO	Wright (24)	Burse, Little (9)	Pondexter (8)	KeyArena; 9,089
Fri 11	7:00	Connecticut	@	Atlanta		88-64; ATL	McCoughtry (18)	de Souza (14)	Lyttle (5)	Philips Arena; 8,644
Fri 11	10:30	Minnesota	@	Los Angeles	NBA TV; FSNW	90-61; LAS	Leslie, Thompson (19)	Parker (14)	Quinn (9)	Staples Center; 13,764
Sat 12	7:00	Atlanta	@	Washington		82-64; WAS	Harding (25)	McCoughtry (13)	Currie (5)	Verizon Center; 11,987
Sat 12	8:00	Seattle	@	San Antonio		64-55; SEA	S. Johnson (16)	Little, Perperoglou (11)	Darling (5)	AT&T Center; 10,153
Sat 12	8:00	Detroit	@	Chicago		80-69; DET	Dupree (27)	McWilliams (10)	Canty (6)	UIC Pavilion; 5,334
Sun 13	3:00	Los Angeles	@	Phoenix	ESPN2 (HD)	81-78; LAS	Parker (24)	Parker (14)	Lennox (6)	US Airways Center; 12,968
Sun 13	3:00	Indiana	@	Connecticut	WCTX	95-85; CON	Gardin (23)	Gardin (8)	Phillips, Wirth (7)	Mohegan Sun Arena; 9,047
Sun 13	4:00	Washington	@	New York	MSG	86-65; NYL	Carson, Currie (17)	Ajavon (9)	Mitchell (6)	Madison Square Garden; 15,667
Sun 13	9:00	Minnesota	@	Sacramento		88-66; SAC	Powell (27)	Paris (14)	Penicheiro (10)	ARCO Arena; 10,212

2009 WNBA Postseason
Conference Semifinals (September 16–21)

Date	Time	Matchup			TV	Result	High points	High rebounds	High assists	Location/Attendance
Wed 16	8:00	Atlanta	@	Detroit	ESPN2 (HD)	94-89; DET	Castro Marques, Nolan (25)	Ford (10)	Castro Marques (7)	Palace of Auburn Hills; 6,122
Wed 16	10:00	Seattle	@	Los Angeles	ESPN2 (HD)	70-63; LAS	Cash (24)	Leslie, Parker (10)	Bird, Harrower, Wright (5)	Staples Center; 7,919
Thu 17	8:00	Indiana	@	Washington	ESPN2 (HD)	88-79; IND	Catchings (26)	Catchings (12)	Melvin (4)	Comcast Center; 6,332
Thu 17	10:00	Phoenix	@	San Antonio	ESPN2 (HD)	92-91; SAN	Young (24)	Wauters (11)	V. Johnson (8)	AT&T Center; 5,721
Fri 18	7:30	Detroit	@	Atlanta	NBA TV	94-79; DET	Nolan (22)	Braxton, Hornbuckle (8)	Braxton, Nolan (5)	Gwinnett Center; 4,780
Fri 18	10:00	Los Angeles	@	Seattle	NBA TV	75-74; SEA	Cash (18)	Leslie (14)	Wright (9)	KeyArena; 8,854
Sat 19	7:00	Washington	@	Indiana	NBA TV	81-74 (OT); IND	Catchings (24)	Catchings (16)	Catchings, Douglas, Harding (5)	Conseco Fieldhouse; 9,655
Sat 19	10:00	San Antonio	@	Phoenix	NBA TV	106-78; PHO	Taurasi (24)	Bonner (13)	Taurasi (5)	US Airways Center; 7,267
Sun 20	5:00	Los Angeles	@	Seattle	ESPN2 (HD)	75-64; LAS	Parker (22)	Cash (10)	Quinn (7)	KeyArena; 8,159
Mon 21	10:00	San Antonio	@	Phoenix	ESPN2 (HD)	100-92; PHO	Taurasi (30)	T. Smith, Young (8)	Taurasi (6)	US Airways Center; 6,896

Conference Finals (September 23–26)

Date	Time	Matchup			TV	Result	High points	High rebounds	High assists	Location/Attendance
Wed 23	8:00	Indiana	@	Detroit	ESPN2 (HD)	72-56; DET	Zellous (23)	Catchings (11)	Bevilaqua, Douglas, Zellous (5)	Palace of Auburn Hills; 7,214
Wed 23	10:00	Phoenix	@	Los Angeles	ESPN2 (HD)	103-94; PHO	Parker, Taurasi (28)	Parker (10)	Taurasi (6)	Pauley Pavilion; 6,389
Fri 25	7:00	Detroit	@	Indiana	NBA TV	79-75; IND	Nolan (23)	Ford (13)	Catchings (5)	Conseco Fieldhouse; 9,210
Fri 25	10:00	Los Angeles	@	Phoenix	NBA TV	87-76; LAS	Taurasi (25)	Parker (18)	Taylor (5)	US Airways Center; 7,628
Sat 26	7:00	Detroit	@	Indiana	NBA TV	72-67; IND	Sutton-Brown (17)	Ford (11)	Catchings (5)	Conseco Fieldhouse; 18,165
Sat 26	10:00	Los Angeles	@	Phoenix	NBA TV	85-74	Leslie (22)	Thompson (11)	Taylor (4)	US Airways Center; 7,226

WNBA Finals (September 29-October 9)

Date	Time	Matchup			TV	Result	High points	High rebounds	High assists	Location/Attendance
Tue 29	9:00	Indiana	@	Phoenix	ESPN2 (HD)	120-116 (OT); PHO	Douglas (20)	Taurasi (9)	January (7)	US Airways Center; 11,617
Thu 1	9:00	Indiana	@	Phoenix	ESPN2 (HD)	93-84; IND	Taurasi (20)	Catchings (9)	Catchings (11)	US Airways Center; 16,758
Sun 4	4:00	Phoenix	@	Indiana	ESPN2 (HD)	86-85; IND	Pondexter (23)	Catchings (12)	Pondexter (8)	Conseco Fieldhouse; 18,165
Wed 7	7:30	Phoenix	@	Indiana	ESPN2 (HD)	90-77; PHO	Catchings (24)	Catchings (12)	Pondexter (7)	Conseco Fieldhouse; 18,165
Fri 9	9:00	Indiana	@	Phoenix	ESPN2 (HD)	94-86; PHO	Taurasi (26)	Catchings (9)	Douglas (9)	US Airways Center; 17,313

== Playoffs ==
**Conference semifinals** Best-of-3
E1	**Indiana**	2
E4	Washington	0
**Eastern Conference**
E2	Atlanta	0
E3	**Detroit**	2
W1	**Phoenix**	2
W4	San Antonio	1
**Western Conference**
W2	Seattle	1
W3	**Los Angeles**	2

**Conference finals** Best-of-3
E1	**Indiana**	2
E3	Detroit	1
W1	**Phoenix**	2
W3	Los Angeles	1

**WNBA Finals**; Best-of-5
E1	Indiana	2
W1	**Phoenix**	3

- **Bold** – Series winner
- Italic – Team with home-court advantage

== Retirements ==
- On February 5, 2009, center Lisa Leslie of the Los Angeles Sparks announced that the 2009 season would be her last in the WNBA. Leslie was one of the four remaining players from the WNBA's inaugural season.
- On May 15, 2009, forward Yolanda Griffith of the Indiana Fever announced that the 2009 season would be her last in the WNBA. Griffith was injured in the third game of the season but continued to help the Fever as an assistant coach figure.
- On May 31, 2009, San Antonio Silver Stars guard Vickie Johnson announced that the 2009 season would be her last in the league. Johnson was one of the four remaining players from the WNBA's inaugural season.
- On September 18, 2009, Seattle Storm guard Shannon "Pee Wee" Johnson announced that she would retire at the end of the 2009 season.
- On September 24, 2009, forward Erin Perperoglou of the San Antonio Silver Stars announced that she would not return to the WNBA.

== Awards ==
=== Individual ===
Award		Winner	Team	Position	Votes/Statistic
Most Valuable Player (MVP)		Diana Taurasi	Phoenix Mercury	Guard	323 out of 966
Finals MVP		Diana Taurasi	Phoenix Mercury	Guard	N/A
Rookie of the Year		Angel McCoughtry	Atlanta Dream	Forward	30 out of 41
Most Improved Player		Crystal Langhorne	Washington Mystics	Forward	19 out of 40
Defensive Player of the Year		Tamika Catchings	Indiana Fever	Forward	34 out of 40
Sixth Woman of the Year		DeWanna Bonner	Phoenix Mercury	Guard	20 out of 38
Kim Perrot Sportsmanship Award		Kara Lawson	Sacramento Monarchs	Guard	8 out of 38
Peak Performers	**Scoring**	Diana Taurasi	Phoenix Mercury	Guard/Forward	20.4 PPG
Peak Performers	**Rebounding**	Candace Parker	Los Angeles Sparks	Forward	9.8 RPG
Peak Performers	**Assists**	Sue Bird	Seattle Storm	Guard	5.8 APG
Coach of the Year		Marynell Meadors	Atlanta Dream	Coach	30 out of 41

=== Team ===
Award		Guard	Guard	Forward	Forward	Center
All-WNBA	**First Team**	Becky Hammon	Diana Taurasi	Cappie Pondexter	Tamika Catchings	Lauren Jackson
All-WNBA	**Second Team**	Deanna Nolan	Katie Douglas	Candace Parker	Sophia Young	Lisa Leslie
All-Defensive	**First Team**	Tully Bevilaqua	Tanisha Wright	Tamika Catchings	Nicky Anosike	Lauren Jackson
All-Defensive	**Second Team**	Alana Beard	Angel McCoughtry	Candace Parker	Sancho Lyttle	Lisa Leslie
All-Defensive	**Second Team**	Deanna Nolan	Angel McCoughtry	Candace Parker	Sancho Lyttle	Lisa Leslie
All-Rookie Team		Renee Montgomery	Shavonte Zellous	Marissa Coleman	Angel McCoughtry	DeWanna Bonner

=== Players of the Week ===
Week ending	Eastern Conference		Western Conference	
Week ending	Player	Team	Player	Team
June 14	Candice Dupree	Chicago Sky	Seimone Augustus	Minnesota Lynx
June 21	Alana Beard	Washington Mystics	Lauren Jackson	Seattle Storm
June 28	Tamika Catchings	Indiana Fever	Candice Wiggins	Minnesota Lynx
Juli 5	Tammy Sutton-Brown	Indiana Fever	Cappie Pondexter	Phoenix Mercury
July 12	Alana Beard (2)	Washington Mystics	Cappie Pondexter (2)	Phoenix Mercury
July 19	Shameka Christon	New York Liberty	Cappie Pondexter (3)	Phoenix Mercury
July 26	Asjha Jones	Connecticut Sun	Sue Bird	Seattle Storm
August 2	Katie Douglas	Indiana Fever	Becky Hammon	San Antonio Silver Stars
August 9	Katie Douglas (2)	Indiana Fever	Becky Hammon (2)	San Antonio Silver Stars
August 16	Sancho Lyttle	Atlanta Dream	Diana Taurasi	Phoenix Mercury
August 23	Sandrine Gruda	Connecticut Sun	Candace Parker	Los Angeles Sparks
August 30	Deanna Nolan	Detroit Shock	Sue Bird (2)	Seattle Storm
September 6	Deanna Nolan (2)	Detroit Shock	Vickie Johnson	San Antonio Silver Stars
September 13	Deanna Nolan (3)	Detroit Shock	Candace Parker (2)	Los Angeles Sparks

== Coaches ==
=== Eastern Conference ===
- Atlanta Dream: Marynell Meadors
- Chicago Sky: Steven Key
- Connecticut Sun: Mike Thibault
- Detroit Shock: Bill Laimbeer and Rick Mahorn
- Indiana Fever: Lin Dunn
- New York Liberty: Pat Coyle and Anne Donovan
- Washington Mystics: Julie Plank

=== Western Conference ===
- Los Angeles Sparks: Michael Cooper
- Minnesota Lynx: Jennifer Gillom
- Phoenix Mercury: Corey Gaines
- Sacramento Monarchs: Jenny Boucek and John Whisenant
- San Antonio Silver Stars: Dan Hughes
- Seattle Storm: Brian Agler

== See also ==
- WNBA
- WNBA draft
- WNBA All-Star Game
- WNBA Playoffs
- WNBA Finals
