= Ruth Riley =

American basketball player (born 1979)

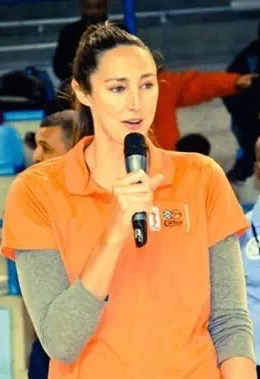
- Riley in 2014

Miami Heat
- Title: Senior Director of Team Development

Personal information
- Born: August 28, 1979 (age 47) Ransom, Kansas, U.S.
- Listed height: 6 ft 4 in (1.93 m)
- Listed weight: 185 lb (84 kg)

Career information
- High school: North Miami (Denver, Indiana)
- College: Notre Dame (1997–2001)
- WNBA draft: 2001: 1st round, 5th overall pick
- Drafted by: Miami Sol
- Playing career: 2001–2014
- Position: Forward / center

Career history
- 2001–2002: Miami Sol
- 2003–2006: Detroit Shock
- 2007–2011: San Antonio Silver Stars
- 2012: Chicago Sky
- 2013–2014: Atlanta Dream

Career highlights
- 2× WNBA All-Star (2004, 2005); 2× WNBA champion (2003, 2006); Kim Perrot Sportsmanship Award (2011); WNBA Finals MVP (2003); 2× First-team All-American – AP (2000, 2001); 2× All-American – USBWA (2000, 2001); Kodak All-American (2001); Naismith College Player of the Year (2001); AP Player of the Year (2001); USBWA Player of the Year (2001); NCAA champion (2001); NCAA Tournament MOP (2001); Sports Illustrated Player of the Year (2001); Big East Player of the Year (2001); Academic All-American of the Year for Division I (2001); Women's Basketball Academic All-American of the Year (2001); 3× Big East Defensive Player of the Year (1999–2001); Third-team All-American – AP (1999); 3× First-team All-Big East (1999–2001); Big East All-Freshman Team (1998)
- Stats at WNBA.com
- Stats at Basketball Reference
- Women's Basketball Hall of Fame
Medals
Women's Basketball
Representing United States
World University Games
Silver medal – second place	1999 Palma de Mallorca	Team competition
Olympics
Gold medal – first place	2004 Athens	Team Competition

Ruth Ellen Riley Hunter (born August 28, 1979) is an American former professional basketball player (a center), playing most recently for the Atlanta Dream in the Women's National Basketball Association (WNBA). Her Notre Dame team won the NCAA women's championship in 2001, and her Detroit Shock team won the WNBA championship in 2003 and 2006. Riley was the Most Valuable Player in the 2001 and 2003 championship series, becoming the first person to win the MVP awards in both the NCAA and the WNBA championships. She has also played on teams that won the National Women's Basketball League (NWBL) championship, the gold medal at the Olympic Games, and the 2010 EuroCup Championship. In 2019, Riley was inducted into the Women's Basketball Hall of Fame.

In March 2016, Riley participated in Mogul's IAmAMogul campaign for inspiring women to believe that they have the "power to shape the world through their voices and actions." She was the general manager for the San Antonio Stars from May 2016 until the team's sale and relocation to Las Vegas in the 2017–18 off-season. In 2022, she joined the Miami Heat front office as the Senior Director of Team Development.

== Early life and education ==
Riley was born in Ransom, Kansas and grew up in Macy, Indiana. She has always been tall, measuring 25 inches (63.50 cm) at birth, and six feet (1.83 m) by the time she was 12 years old. While attending North Miami Middle/High School outside Denver, Indiana, she was on the basketball, volleyball and track teams. It was in high school that she began her practice of wearing a headband while playing. During her four years at high school she scored 1,372 points, acquired 1,011 rebounds and blocked 427 shots. She averaged 26 points a game as a senior, and had her jersey number (25) retired by the high school.

== College career ==
In her freshman year at Notre Dame, Riley played in all 32 of the team's games, starting in the final 26. Thereafter she was the starting center in all but one of Notre Dame's games. She was a mainstay of the team in all four years, and consistently ranked high in the nation among women basketball players in field goal percentage and blocked shots. In both her junior and senior years she was an Associated Press First Team All-American selection. As a senior, she won the Naismith Award and was the Associated Press Player of the Year. In addition, she was the 2000-01 Academic All-American of the Year for the University Division.

The highlight of her college career came in the 2001 NCAA tournament. In the championship game, Notre Dame was trailing Purdue, 66–64, when Riley scored the tying field goal. Then, with 5.8 seconds left and the score still tied, Riley drew a foul. She made both free throws to give Notre Dame its final 68–66 edge and its first women's national championship. Notre Dame coach Muffet McGraw, when asked about the critical play on which Riley was fouled, said, "It's the same play we've been running all season. It's called: 'Get the ball to Ruth.'" Riley was the Most Outstanding Player of that year's Final Four. The only player in Notre Dame women's basketball history to score 2,000 career points and grab 1,000 career rebounds, Riley was a two-time first-team Academic All-American in both 2000 and '01. In 1999, Riley led the nation in field goal percentage shooting 68.3% to become the first Irish player to rank first in an NCAA statistical category.

Riley graduated from Notre Dame in 2001 with a degree in psychology, having made the Dean's List every semester. She finished her Notre Dame career with 2,072 points, and school records for rebounds (1,007), blocked shots (370), and field goal percentage (.632).

== Professional career ==
=== WNBA ===
On April 20, 2001, Riley was selected by the Miami Sol as the fifth overall pick in the 2001 WNBA draft. She came off the bench for the first 12 games. On July 1, she made her first professional start, on the road against the Los Angeles Sparks, and started for the rest of the season.

Her second season (2002) was a difficult one. After playing well in the preseason, she broke a finger the day before the regular season started. She could not play for the Sol's first several games – the first time in her career she had missed a game because of an injury. She returned, playing with a splint on her hand, but lost her starting spot. During the WNBA's off-season, she played in Valencia, Spain.

After Riley's second season with the Sol, that franchise folded. On April 25, 2003, the WNBA held a special one-round dispersal draft, in which the remaining WNBA teams could select players from the Sol and from the Portland Fire, which had also folded. The Detroit Shock, by virtue of having the worst regular-season record in the WNBA in 2002, received the first pick in the dispersal draft, and used it to select Riley.

In Riley's first season with the Shock (2003), she was a key member of the team. She bettered each of her previous WNBA season totals in points, rebounds, blocked shots, and assists. The Shock, in a notable turnaround, went from a 2002 season with the worst record in the league (9–23) to a 2003 season with the best record (25–9) and a victory in the WNBA Championship. In the finals, the Shock defeated the two-time defending champion Los Angeles Sparks to win Detroit's first WNBA title. Riley was named the MVP of the WNBA finals.

Riley continued to play for the Shock in the 2004, 2005, and 2006 seasons. In 2005, she was selected for the Eastern Conference team in the WNBA All-Star Game. In 2006, she was the starting center when the Shock won its second WNBA championship, defeating the Sacramento Monarchs.

In February 2007, she was traded to the San Antonio Silver Stars in exchange for Katie Feenstra. The Shock also received the right to exchange first-round draft picks with the Silver Stars in 2008. The Chicago Sky signed the veteran 6-foot-5 center and two-time WNBA champion Riley, the team announced on Monday February sixth 2012.

Riley was waived by Chicago on May 23, 2013.

On June 18, 2013, Riley signed with Atlanta after a roster spot opened up when Sancho Lyttle was suspended following her departure to play six games for her national team.

=== NWBL ===
The WNBA off-season was when the National Women's Basketball League operated. It provided a showcase for players hoping to make a WNBA team, and also attracted established WNBA players. In the fall of 2003, Riley joined the Colorado Chill of the NWBL. On April 1, 2005, in her second season, the Chill won the NWBL championship.

In Riley's third season with the Chill, she broke her thumb in a preseason workout and missed the team's first 14 games. She returned to action on March 21, 2006. She played in the last four regular-season games, all of which the Chill won to finish tied for the regular-season championship. In the playoffs, the Chill won both its games to repeat as NWBL champions. Riley was named as the playoff MVP.

=== Spanish League ===
After the WNBA's 2005 season, Riley played for Yaya Maria Porta XI in the 2005–06 season of the Spanish League. In January 2009 she signed for Rivasecópolis, and played again in the Spanish League.

=== Polish League ===
Riley played the 2006-07 European season for Lotos Gdynia in the Polish League. This club was long the European home for fellow WNBA player Margo Dydek, and also at one time featured another American WNBA star in Katie Smith.

=== Greek league ===
In January 2010, the Athinaikos club in the Greek league announced that Riley would join it for the remainder of its season. She replaced LaToya Davis, who broke her wrist. In April 2010, Riley helped Athinaikos to win their first EuroCup Women's Basketball Title.

== International career ==
While in college, Riley played on the U.S. team in the 1999 World University Games in Palma de Mallorca, Spain. The team won the silver medal.

In 2002, she practiced with the USA Women's Senior National Team, but did not make the final cut to play in the Basketball World Championship.

In 2004, she again practiced with the USA Women's Senior National Team and played in several of its games. She was selected for the 2004 U.S. Women's Olympic Team. In Olympic play, the team was undefeated and won the gold medal.

== Career statistics ==
Legend
GP	Games played	GS	Games started	MPG	Minutes per game	FG%	Field goal percentage
3P%	3-point field goal percentage	FT%	Free throw percentage	RPG	Rebounds per game	APG	Assists per game
SPG	Steals per game	BPG	Blocks per game	TO	Turnovers per game	PPG	Points per game
**Bold**	Career high	*	Led Division I	°	Led the league	‡	WNBA record

†	Denotes season in which Riley won a WNBA championship
*	Denotes seasons in which Riley won an NCAA Championship

=== WNBA ===
==== Regular season ====
WNBA regular season statistics
Year	Team	GP	GS	MPG	FG%	3P%	FT%	RPG	APG	SPG	BPG	TO	PPG
2001	Miami	32	20	25.0	47.5	–	77.1	4.1	0.8	0.8	1.4	2.0	6.8
2002	Miami	26	8	20.0	46.5	–	60.9	3.5	1.0	0.4	1.6	1.9	5.7
2003 †	Detroit	**34**	**34**	29.3	49.8	–	76.4	**5.9**	**1.9**	0.7	1.7	2.4	9.6
2004	Detroit	**34**	**34**	**30.5**	44.6	50.0	81.6	**5.9**	1.5	**0.9**	1.6	2.4	**11.1**
2005	Detroit	33	33	25.9	37.5	25.0	80.0	4.7	1.2	0.7	1.4	2.1	7.6
2006 †	Detroit	**34**	**34**	25.8	45.6	33.3	88.9	4.9	1.5	0.5	1.4	1.6	7.3
2007	San Antonio	30	29	25.8	37.1	18.5	**93.1**	4.9	1.2	**0.9**	**2.0**	2.3	5.9
2008	San Antonio	30	3	19.3	43.4	32.1	85.7	3.6	1.0	0.5	1.4	1.7	5.1
2009	San Antonio	31	17	21.0	46.3	22.2	88.5	4.5	0.9	0.5	1.5	1.1	5.3
2010	San Antonio	20	2	13.1	**53.7**	20.0	80.0	2.3	1.0	0.3	0.7	1.0	3.8
2011	San Antonio	**34**	**34**	19.0	48.5	**57.1**	76.9	3.8	1.2	0.4	0.9	0.9	5.6
2012	Chicago	33	14	14.4	37.9	27.8	78.6	2.4	1.0	0.7	0.6	0.8	2.7
2013	Atlanta	16	0	7.6	31.6	40.0	66.7	0.8	0.2	0.2	0.3	**0.5**	1.1
**Career**	13 years, 5 teams	387	262	22.2	44.2	29.7	78.7	4.1	1.2	0.6	1.3	1.6	6.3
**Career**	All-Star	1	1	14.0	80.0	–	100.0	1.0	1.0	0.0	0.0	0.0	10.0

==== Playoffs ====
WNBA playoff statistics
Year	Team	GP	GS	MPG	FG%	3P%	FT%	RPG	APG	SPG	BPG	TO	PPG
2001	Miami	3	3	**36.7**	42.1	–	42.1	5.3	1.0	0.3	1.3	1.0	8.0
2003 †	Detroit	8	8	32.3	38.7	–	80.8	**6.1**	2.5	0.6	2.5	1.6	**12.9**
2004	Detroit	3	3	31.7	42.9	–	73.3	5.0	**3.0**	0.7	2.0	0.7	9.7
2005	Detroit	2	2	27.0	41.2	**100.0**	–	5.5	0.0	0.5	1.0	**2.5**	8.5
2006 †	Detroit	**10**	**10**	22.5	38.5	–	**100.0**	3.2	0.5	0.5	1.3	1.5	4.4
2007	San Antonio	5	5	26.4	45.2	50.0	–	5.0	2.2	0.6	**2.6**	1.6	6.0
2008	San Antonio	9	1	17.1	21.2	11.1	75.0	2.1	1.1	0.4	0.9	1.4	2.0
2009	San Antonio	3	0	14.7	50.0	–	66.7	2.3	0.3	0.3	1.3	0.3	4.0
2010	San Antonio	2	0	15.5	45.5	–	**100.0**	2.0	0.0	**1.5**	1.5	0.5	7.5
2011	San Antonio	3	3	18.7	45.5	50.0	50.0	4.3	**3.0**	0.3	1.3	1.0	4.0
2013	Atlanta	4	0	6.5	**75.0**	**100.0**	50.0	0.5	0.3	0.0	0.0	0.5	2.0
**Career**	11 years, 4 teams	52	35	22.8	39.3	42.1	69.9	3.7	1.3	0.5	1.5	1.3	6.0

=== College ===
NCAA statistics
Year	Team	GP	GS	MPG	FG%	3P%	FT%	RPG	APG	SPG	BPG	TO	PPG
1997–98	Notre Dame	32	-	-	60.0	-	74.8	7.3	0.7	**0.8**	2.2	-	11.5
1998–99	Notre Dame	31	-	-	**68.3***	-	69.0	**8.4**	1.3	**0.8**	**3.3**	-	16.6
1999–00	Notre Dame	32	-	-	61.5	-	**80.5**	7.3	1.3	0.5	2.7	-	16.2
2000–01 *	Notre Dame	**36**	-	-	62.8	-	76.8	7.8	**1.9**	0.6	3.1	-	**18.7**
**Career**		131	-	-	63.2	-	75.4	7.7	1.3	0.7	2.8	-	15.8

== Community and global outreach ==
=== Nothing But Nets ===
Ruth Riley supports a number charitable organizations. Since its inception in December 2006, Riley has been a spokesperson of the UN Foundation's Nothing But Nets, a global campaign that saves lives through the strategic prevention of Malaria. Through her work with the Nothing But Nets campaign, Riley has made multiple trips to different regions in Africa helping to amplify awareness of the malaria disease. In August 2008, Ruth helped raise money for Nothing But Nets during a San Antonio Silver Stars 5k run/walk. As a result of her efforts, Riley won August's WNBA Community Assist Award in 2008.

=== "No Kid Hungry" ===
Riley was introduce to Share Our Strength at the NBA All-Star Jam Session. Share Our Strength is a national nonprofit committed to ending childhood hunger in America by making sure that children in need are enrolled in federal programs. It invests in community organizations fighting hunger, teaches families how to cook healthy meals on a budget, and builds public-private partnerships to end hunger on a national and state level. Riley, stopped by the booth to take the No Kid Hungry pledge and found out that they were launching an Illinois Initiative that March. She offered to help in any way she could and was subsequently asked to speak at their at the official launch. In the summer of 2012, Ruth, along with the NBA/WNBA joined with Share Our Strength to connect more than 50,000 youth to free meals in the summer across the United States.

== Other activities ==
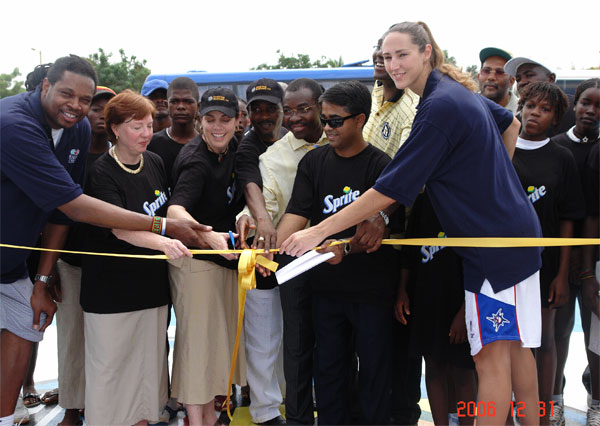
Riley at the ribbon cutting for four donated basketball courts in Angola

Riley wrote a children's book, The Spirit of Basketball, with co-author Paul Hickey and illustrator Christopher Hiller, that was published in 2005. According to Riley, the message of the book was "that basketball is the same no matter where you live or what language you speak".

On January 26, 2005, Riley made her debut as a color commentator for a Notre Dame women's basketball game.

As of 2005, Riley was the vice president of the WNBA Players' Union.

In 2009, President George W. Bush appointed Riley to the President's Council on Physical Fitness and Sports.

In 2015, Riley was awarded the Moose Krause Distinguished Service Award by the Notre Dame Monogram Club.

In 2018 she became one of the broadcast analysts for the Miami Heat of the NBA, the first woman in that role for the Heat. She is not related to Pat Riley, the president of the Heat.

== Personal life ==
Riley's height is variously listed as 6'4" and 6'5". She has said that she is "six-foot-four and a half to be exact" (1.94 m).

In 2001, while playing for the Sol, Riley bought a home in South Beach, and returned to the area in the offseason even when playing for other organizations.

Riley married Benjamin Hunter, another Notre Dame alum and varsity football player, on New Year's Day 2018.

== Awards and honors ==
- 2× First-team All-American (2000, 2001)
- Naismith Player of the Year (2001)
- NCAA champion (2001)
- NCAA Final Four MOP (2001)
- Sports Illustrated Player of the Year (2001)
- Big East Player of the Year (2001)
- Academic All-American of the Year for Division I (2001)
- 3× Big East Defensive Player of the Year (1999–2001)
- Edward "Moose" Krause Distinguished Service Award (2015)
- Atlantic Coast Conference Women's Basketball Legend (2014)
- Ten Outstanding Young Persons of the World (TOYP) by JCI (2014)
- CoSIDA Academic All-American Hall of Fame (2012)
- Henry P. Iba Citizen Athlete of the Year Award (2010)
- Notre Dame's Basketball Ring of Honor Inductee (2010)
- WNBA Hall of Fame Inductee (2019)
