= 2008 Detroit Shock season =

- Head coach: Bill Laimbeer
- Arena: The Palace of Auburn Hills

Results
- Record: 22–12 (.647)
- Place: 1st (Eastern)
- Playoff finish: Won WNBA Finals

The 2008 WNBA season was the 11th for the Detroit Shock, an American women's professional basketball team. The Shock returned to the WNBA Finals for the third consecutive year, winning their second WNBA Championship in three seasons, and their third in six years.

During the Finals, Katie Smith averaged a team high 21.7 points per game to be named WNBA Finals MVP. Similar to Kevin Garnett with the 2008 Boston Celtics, Taj McWilliams-Franklin won her first championship after 10 years in the league.

== Offseason ==
The following player was lost in the Atlanta Dream expansion draft:

- Katie Feenstra

=== WNBA draft ===
Round	Pick	Player	Nationality	School/Team/Country
1	4 (from Atl. via Sea.)	Alexis Hornbuckle	United States	Tennessee
1	11 (from SA)	Tasha Humphrey	United States	Georgia
2	18 (from Atl.)	Olayinka Sanni	United States	West Virginia
3	42	Valeriya Berezhynska	United States	Rice

== Transactions ==
- September 4: The Shock signed Ashley Shields.
- August 19: The Shock signed Ashley Shields to a seven-day contract.
- August 12: The Shock traded Tasha Humphrey, Eshaya Murphy and a second-round pick in the 2009 WNBA Draft to the Washington Mystics for Taj McWilliams-Franklin.
- August 8: The Shock waived Stacey Lovelace.
- July 26: The Shock signed Kelly Schumacher.
- July 25: The Shock waived Nancy Lieberman.
- July 24: The Shock signed Nancy Lieberman to a seven-day contract.
- July 11: The Shock signed Stacey Lovelace.
- June 27: The Shock waived Chrissy Givens.
- June 22: The Shock traded LaToya Thomas to the Minnesota Lynx for Eshaya Murphy.
- June 18: The Shock waived Wanisha Smith and signed Chrissy Givens.
- May 15: The Shock waived Michelle Campbell and Wanisha Smith.
- May 8: The Shock signed Wanisha Smith to a training camp contract.
- May 7: The Shock signed free agent Sheri Sam.
- May 5: The Shock waived Valeriya Berezhynska, Natasha Lacy and Tyresa Smith.
- April 26: The Shock waived Chakhia Cole, Fantasia Goodwin and Samantha Mahoney.
- April 18: The Shock waived Nina Norman.
- April 17: The Shock signed Samantha Mahoney to a training camp contract.
- April 16: The Shock signed Chakhia Cole to a training camp contract.
- March 31: The Shock signed Elaine Powell to a training camp contract.
- March 10: The Shock re-signed free agents Cheryl Ford, Deanna Nolan and Katie Smith.
- March 4: The Shock signed Tyresa Smith and Michelle Campbell to training camp contracts.
- February 29: The Shock signed Nina Norman to a training camp contract.
- February 28: The Shock re-signed free agent Plenette Pierson and signed Chrissy Givens to a training camp contract.
- February 19: The Shock traded Swin Cash to the Seattle Storm in exchange for the 4th pick in the 2008 WNBA Draft.
- February 6: The Shock traded Ivory Latta to the Atlanta Dream in exchange for LaToya Thomas and the 18th pick in the 2008 WNBA Draft.

=== Trades ===
Date	Trade	
February 6, 2008	To Detroit Shock	To Atlanta Dream
February 6, 2008	LaToya Thomas and the 18th pick in the 2008 WNBA draft	Ivory Latta
February 19, 2008	To Detroit Shock	To Seattle Storm
February 19, 2008	The 4th pick in the 2008 WNBA draft	Swin Cash
June 22, 2008	To Detroit Shock	To Minnesota Lynx
June 22, 2008	Eshaya Murphy	LaToya Thomas
August 12, 2008	To Detroit Shock	To Washington Mystics
August 12, 2008	Taj McWilliams-Franklin	Tasha Humphrey, Eshaya Murphy, and a second-round pick in the 2009 WNBA draft

=== Free agents ===
==== Additions ====
Player	Signed	Former team
Plenette Pierson	February 28, 2008	re-signed
Cheryl Ford	March 10, 2008	re-signed
Deanna Nolan	March 10, 2008	re-signed
Katie Smith	March 10, 2008	re-signed
Elaine Powell	March 31, 2008	re-signed
Sheri Sam	May 7, 2008	Indiana Fever
Kelly Schumacher	July 26, 2008	Phoenix Mercury
Taj McWilliams-Franklin	August 12, 2008	Washington Mystics
Ashley Shields	August 19, 2008	Houston Comets

==== Subtractions ====
Player	Left	New team
Katie Feenstra	February 6, 2008	Atlanta Dream
Ivory Latta	February 6, 2008	Atlanta Dream
Swin Cash	February 19, 2008	Seattle Storm
Shannon Johnson	March 7, 2008	Houston Comets
Tyresa Smith	May 5, 2008	free agent
Tasha Humphrey	August 12, 2008	Washington Mystics
Tausha Mills	2008	free agent
Ayana Walker	2008	free agent

== Season Highlights ==
The Shock season opener resulted in a record-breaking debut for rookie guard Alexis Hornbuckle. Hornbuckle set a Shock record with seven steals to help the Shock beat the Houston Comets on May 17. Deanna Nolan scored a franchise-record 44 points (28 in the fourth quarter and overtime) in a 98-93 victory over the Minnesota Lynx on June 20.

=== Malice at the Palace ===
- The Sparks–Shock brawl (also known as The Malice at the Palace II) was an altercation that occurred in a game between the Detroit Shock and Los Angeles Sparks on July 22, 2008 at The Palace of Auburn Hills. With 4.2 seconds before the game was officially over, the fighting began on the court after Plenette Pierson made a hard block out after a free throw on Candace Parker. This was the second brawl to occur at the Palace, the other being the Pacers–Pistons brawl.

=== Nancy Lieberman ===
In July, the Detroit Shock signed Nancy Lieberman, the franchise's first head coach and general manager, to a 7-day contract. The 50-year-old Lieberman broke her own record for being the oldest player in the WNBA. Lieberman, a Hall of Famer since 1999, was 39 years old when she played with Phoenix during the league's first year in 1997.

The 50-year-old Lieberman played nine minutes and had two assists. One of the assists included a no-look pass in the closing minutes of the Detroit Shock's 79-61 loss to the Houston Comets on July 24.

Lieberman made an appearance in the Shock's first game against the Los Angeles Sparks on July 22 due to the bench-clearing brawl. Five Shock players were suspended and Cheryl Ford suffered a season-ending injury, prompting coach Bill Laimbeer to offer Lieberman the seven-day contract.

== Roster ==
2008 Detroit Shock roster
Players
Coaches

Pos.	No.	Nat.	Name	Height	Weight	From
C	45	(United States)	Braxton, Kara	6' 6" (1.98m)	210 lb (95kg)	Georgia
PF	35	(United States)	Ford, Cheryl (injured)	6' 3" (1.91m)	198 lb (90kg)	Louisiana Tech
SG	22	(United States)	Hornbuckle, Alexis	5' 11" (1.8m)	155 lb (70kg)	Tennessee
PF	44	(United States)	McWilliams-Franklin, Taj	6' 2" (1.88m)	184 lb (83kg)	St. Edward's University
SG	14	(United States)	Nolan, Deanna (C)	5' 11" (1.8m)	144 lb (65kg)	Georgia
SF	23	(United States)	Pierson, Plenette	6' 2" (1.88m)	181 lb (82kg)	Texas Tech
PG	5	(United States)	Powell, Elaine	5' 8" (1.73m)	150 lb (68kg)	LSU
G/F	55	(United States)	Sam, Sheri	6' 0" (1.83m)	160 lb (73kg)	Vanderbilt
C	24	(United States)	Sanni, Olayinka	6' 2" (1.88m)	205 lb (93kg)	West Virginia
C	11	(United States)	Schumacher, Kelly	6' 5" (1.96m)	183 lb (83kg)	Connecticut
SG	3	(United States)	Shields, Ashley	5' 10" (1.78m)	155 lb (70kg)	Southwest Tennessee Community College
G/F	30	(United States)	Smith, Katie (C)	5' 11" (1.8m)	174 lb (79kg)	Ohio State

Head coach
(United States) Bill Laimbeer (Notre Dame)
Assistant coaches
(United States) Rick Mahorn (Hampton)
(United States) Cheryl Reeve (La Salle)
Athletic trainer
(United States) Laura Ramus (Wayne State (MI))
Strength and conditioning coach
(United States) Laura Ramus (Wayne State (MI))

Legend

- (C) Team captain
- (DP) Unsigned draft pick
- (FA) Free agent
- (S) Suspended
- Injured

WNBA roster page

== Season standings ==
Eastern Conference	W	L	PCT	GB	Home	Road	Conf.
Detroit Shock ^{x}	22	12	.647	–	14–3	8–9	16–4
Connecticut Sun ^{x}	21	13	.618	1.0	13–4	8–9	13–7
New York Liberty ^{x}	19	15	.559	3.0	11–6	8–9	11–9
Indiana Fever ^{x}	17	17	.500	5.0	11–6	6–11	12–8
Chicago Sky ^{o}	12	22	.353	10.0	8–9	4–13	10–10
Washington Mystics ^{o}	10	24	.294	12.0	6–11	4–13	6–14
Atlanta Dream ^{o}	4	30	.118	18.0	1–16	3–14	2–18

== Schedule ==
=== Regular season ===
2008 Game Log: Regular Season
May

Game	Date	Opponent	Score	High points	High rebounds	High assists	Location/Attendance	Record
1	May 17	Houston	85-66	Smith (21)	Ford (11)	Ford (4)	Palace of Auburn Hills; 13,824	1-0
2	May 18	@ Minnesota	70-84	Smith (17)	Ford (9)	Nolan (6)	Target Center; 9,972	1-1
3	May 21	Indiana	76-71	Braxton (22)	Ford (10)	Nolan (8)	Palace of Auburn Hills; 6,842	2-1
4	May 23	@ Atlanta	88-76	Nolan (33)	Ford (13)	Nolan (8)	Philips Arena; 11,609	3-1
5	May 25	New York	72-62	Pierson (25)	Braxton, Powell (7)	Nolan (7)	Palace of Auburn Hills; 8,068	4-1
6	May 31	@ Indiana	74-65	Smith (19)	Ford (8)	Nolan, Powell (3)	Conseco Fieldhouse; 9,219	5-1

June

Game	Date	Opponent	Score	High points	High rebounds	High assists	Location/Attendance	Record
7	June 4	Seattle	77-67	Smith (33)	Ford (11)	Nolan (8)	Palace of Auburn Hills; 8,108	6-1
8	June 6	@ Sacramento	84-70	Smith (30)	Braxton, Ford, Nolan (6)	Nolan (9)	ARCO Arena; 6,663	7-1
9	June 7	@ Seattle	67-75	Smith (18)	Pierson (10)	Hornbuckle, Pierson (3)	KeyArena; 7,105	7-2
10	June 11	@ Los Angeles	73-80	Smith (16)	Pierson, Smith (7)	Smith (4)	STAPLES Center; 8,520	7-3
11	June 14	@ Phoenix	89-79	Humphrey (28)	Hornbuckle (15)	Nolan (8)	US Airways Center; 7,696	8-3
12	June 20	Minnesota	98-93 (OT)	Nolan (44)	Ford (14)	Pierson (4)	Palace of Auburn Hills; 8,916	9-3
13	June 22	@ Atlanta	97-76	Ford (20)	Ford (12)	Nolan (7)	Philips Arena; 7,865	10-3
14	June 24	@ Connecticut	68-85	Nolan (17)	Ford (11)	Smith (4)	Mohegan Sun Arena; 7,501	10-4
15	June 26	Connecticut	70-61	Nolan (13)	Ford (9)	Smith (4)	Palace of Auburn Hills; 8,636	11-4
16	June 28	@ Chicago	59-76	Murphy (13)	Ford (8)	Hornbuckle, Sam (4)	UIC Pavilion; 3,407	11-5
17	June 29	Atlanta	100-92	Braxton (26)	Braxton (9)	Nolan (11)	Palace of Auburn Hills; 8,798	12-5

July

Game	Date	Opponent	Score	High points	High rebounds	High assists	Location/Attendance	Record
18	July 1	@ San Antonio	72-79 (OT)	Smith (17)	Ford, Sam (8)	Smith (9)	AT&T Center; 5,656	12-6
19	July 8	Connecticut	88-82	Pierson (23)	Braxton (8)	Nolan (8)	Palace of Auburn Hills; 7,623	13-6
20	July 11	Washington	79-66	Smith (23)	Braxton, Ford (7)	Nolan (4)	Palace of Auburn Hills; 8,596	14-6
21	July 12	@ New York	64-74	Smith, Pierson (13)	Ford (12)	Nolan (4)	Madison Square Garden; 8,661	14-7
22	July 16	Chicago	66-63	Ford (14)	Pierson (8)	Nolan, Smith (4)	Palace of Auburn Hills; 15,210	15-7
23	July 18	@ Washington	99-62	Nolan (26)	Braxton, Hornbuckle (6)	Sam (8)	Verizon Center; 6,834	16-7
24	July 20	Sacramento	85-88	Nolan (27)	Ford (10)	Smith (6)	Palace of Auburn Hills; 9,138	16-8
25	July 22	Los Angeles	81-84	Smith (20)	Ford (9)	Hornbuckle, Smith (5)	Palace of Auburn Hills; 12,930	16-9
26	July 24	@ Houston	61-79	Nolan (23)	Nolan, Sam (9)	Nolan (4)	Reliant Arena; 7,261	16-10
27	July 27	San Antonio	64-76	Nolan (25)	Braxton (9)	Smith (6)	Palace of Auburn Hills; 9,537	16-11

August

Game	Date	Opponent	Score	High points	High rebounds	High assists	Location/Attendance	Record
Summer Olympic break
28	August 29	New York	83-69	Nolan (26)	Braxton, McWilliams-Franklin (7)	Smith (6)	Palace of Auburn Hills; 11,516	17-11
29	August 31	@ Chicago	81-82 (OT)	Smith (23)	McWilliams-Franklin (11)	Nolan (6)	UIC Pavilion; 4,197	17-12

September

Game	Date	Opponent	Score	High points	High rebounds	High assists	Location/Attendance	Record
30	September 5	Indiana	90-68	Pierson (20)	Pierson (6)	McWilliams-Franklin, Pierson (4)	Palace of Auburn Hills; 9,287	18-12
31	September 6	@ Washington	84-69	McWilliams-Franklin (21)	Nolan (10)	Smith (8)	Verizon Center; 9,976	19-12
32	September 9	Phoenix	89-78	Nolan (18)	Braxton, Hornbuckle, McWilliams-Franklin (8)	Pierson, Smith (5)	Palace of Auburn Hills; 7,495	20-12
33	September 11	Washington	78-66	Nolan (17)	McWilliams-Franklin (8)	Smith (6)	Palace of Auburn Hills; 8,145	21-12
34	September 14	@ New York	61-59	Nolan, Pierson (11)	Hornbuckle, Nolan (7)	Powell (4)	Madison Square Garden; 10,042	22-12

=== Postseason ===
2008 Game Log: Postseason
Eastern Conference Semifinals

Game	Date	Opponent	Score	High points	High rebounds	High assists	Location/Attendance	Series
1	September 19	@ Indiana	81-72	Nolan (22)	Braxton, McWilliams-Franklin (7)	Powell, Smith (3)	Conseco Fieldhouse; 7,613	1-0
2	September 21	Indiana	82-89	Nolan, Pierson (16)	Pierson, Powell (7)	Pierson (5)	Palace of Auburn Hills; 8,219	1-1
3	September 23	Indiana	80-61	Nolan (21)	Hornbuckle (8)	Hornbuckle, McWilliams-Franklin (4)	Palace of Auburn Hills; 8,296	2-1

Eastern Conference Finals

Game	Date	Opponent	Score	High points	High rebounds	High assists	Location/Attendance	Series
1	September 26	@ New York	56-60	Nolan (22)	Hornbuckle, McWilliams-Franklin (7)	4 players (2)	Madison Square Garden; 14,711	1-0
2	September 28	New York	64-55	Nolan (22)	Taj McWilliams-Franklin (11)	4 players (2)	EMU Convocation Center; 7,965	1-1
3	September 29	New York	75-73	Nolan (21)	Taj McWilliams-Franklin (8)	Nolan, Smith (3)	EMU Convocation Center; 7,429	2-1

WNBA Finals

Game	Date	Opponent	Score	High points	High rebounds	High assists	Location/Attendance	Series
1	October 1	@ San Antonio	77-69	Smith (25)	Smith (9)	Nolan (4)	AT&T Center; 9,380	1-0
2	October 3	@ San Antonio	69-61	Smith (22)	Nolan (7)	Smith (6)	AT&T Center; 16,012	2-0
3	October 5	San Antonio	76-60	Smith (18)	Braxton, Hornbuckle (9)	Hornbuckle, Nolan (5)	EMU Convocation Center; 8,952	3-0

== Player stats ==
Legend
GP	Games played	GS	Games started	MPG	Minutes per game	RPG	Rebounds per game
APG	Assists per game	SPG	Steals per game	BPG	Blocks per game	PPG	Points per game
FG%	Field-goal percentage	3P%	3-point field-goal percentage	FT%	Free-throw percentage	TO	Turnovers per game
PF	Fouls per game		Team leader		League leader

=== Regular season ===
Player	GP	GS	MPG	FG%	3P%	FT%	RPG	APG	SPG	BPG	PPG
Deanna Nolan	34	34	33.6	.465	.374	.863	3.9	4.4	1.2	0.3	15.8
Katie Smith	34	34	33.9	.383	.360	.887	2.8	4.0	0.9	0.1	14.7
Plenette Pierson	28	0	23.2	.457	.000	.752	4.9	2.3	0.9	1.2	11.9
Taj McWilliams-Franklin	7	7	26.2	.422	1.000	.909	6.7	1.9	0.4	0.7	10.7
Cheryl Ford	24	24	26.5	.481	.000	.560	8.7	0.9	1.0	0.4	10.1
Kara Braxton	33	10	17.9	.415	.000	.743	5.1	0.8	0.4	0.7	8.9
Tasha Humphrey	22	16	13.5	.500	.385	.955	2.9	1.0	0.6	0.3	7.3
Alexis Hornbuckle	34	0	22.0	.354	.356	.636	4.1	2.1	2.3	0.3	5.4
Elaine Powell	16	16	19.6	.490	.500	.750	3.1	2.2	0.4	0.7	3.6
Olayinka Sanni	31	9	10.5	.500	.000	.649	2.1	0.2	0.4	0.2	3.4
Ashley Shields	7	0	6.3	.364	.333	.750	0.4	0.3	0.1	0.0	3.1
Sheri Sam	32	15	14.9	.309	.286	.692	2.8	1.2	0.6	0.1	2.9
Eshaya Murphy	13	3	9.4	.300	.263	.667	1.6	0.5	0.5	0.2	2.5
Kelly Schumacher	7	0	12.7	.375	.000	1.000	2.9	0.7	0.3	0.4	2.0
Stacey Lovelace	7	2	6.3	.286	.400	.667	1.0	0.1	0.1	0.0	1.4
LaToya Thomas	7	0	5.7	.267	.000	.000	0.7	0.1	0.1	0.1	1.1
Chrissy Givens	3	0	3.3	.000	.000	1.000	0.0	0.7	0.0	0.0	0.7
Wanisha Smith	1	0	0.0	.000	.000	.000	0.0	0.0	0.0	0.0	0.0
Nancy Lieberman	1	0	9.0	.000	.000	.000	0.0	2.0	0.0	0.0	0.0

Detroit Shock Regular Season Stats

=== Postseason ===
Player	GP	GS	MPG	FG%	3P%	FT%	RPG	APG	SPG	BPG	PPG
Deanna Nolan	9	9	38.8	.359	.341	.939	4.6	2.9	2.1	0.3	17.6
Katie Smith	9	9	34.3	.410	.354	.758	4.0	2.4	0.4	0.1	15.3
Taj McWilliams-Franklin	9	9	32.6	.490	.500	.864	7.0	2.1	1.0	1.3	12.9
Kara Braxton	9	9	20.0	.500	.000	.650	5.3	1.0	0.4	0.6	8.6
Plenette Pierson	6	0	17.8	.474	.000	.846	3.0	1.7	0.7	0.3	7.8
Alexis Hornbuckle	9	0	24.4	.429	.375	.750	4.9	2.1	1.2	0.8	6.3
Elaine Powell	9	9	19.0	.588	.000	.818	2.3	2.0	0.7	0.0	3.2
Olayinka Sanni	9	0	7.3	.438	.000	.500	1.8	0.3	0.3	0.0	1.8
Kelly Schumacher	8	0	11.9	.438	.000	.000	3.0	0.4	0.1	0.4	1.8
Sheri Sam	6	0	5.0	.286	.000	1.000	0.5	0.0	0.2	0.0	1.0
Ashley Shields	3	0	1.3	.200	.000	.000	0.0	0.3	0.3	0.0	0.7

Detroit Shock Playoff Stats

== Awards and honors ==
- Katie Smith, WNBA Player of the Week (June 2–8)
- Deanna Nolan, WNBA Player of the Week (June 16–22 and July 14–20)
- Deanna Nolan, All-WNBA Defensive Second Team
- Katie Smith, All-WNBA Defensive Second Team
- Deanna Nolan, All-WNBA Second Team
- Katie Smith, WNBA Finals MVP
