= Ashley Shields =

American basketball player (born 1985)

Personal information
- Born: June 15, 1985 (age 40) Memphis, Tennessee, U.S.
- Listed height: 5 ft 10 in (1.78 m)
- Listed weight: 155 lb (70 kg)

Career information
- High school: Melrose (Memphis, Tennessee)
- College: SW Tennessee CC (2006–2007)
- WNBA draft: 2007: 1st round, 8th overall pick
- Drafted by: Houston Comets
- Playing career: 2007–present
- Position: Guard
- Number: 3

Career history
- 2007–2008: Houston Comets
- 2008: Detroit Shock
- 2008–2011: Elizur-Maccabi Netanya
- 2011–present: Dobrí anjeli Košice

Career highlights
- WNBA champion (2008); Class AAA Tennessee Miss Basketball (2003)
- Stats at Basketball Reference

Ashley Shields (born June 15, 1985) is an American professional women's basketball player, most recently with the Detroit Shock of the WNBA. Shields, who attended Southwest Tennessee Community College, became the first WNBA player drafted out of a community college. The Houston Comets took her with the eighth pick in the 2007 WNBA draft.

== WNBA career ==
Shields debuted in 2007, appearing in 26 games her rookie season, averaging 5.3 points per game for the Comets. She played in just three games in 2008 before being waived. She was eventually signed by the Detroit Shock, appearing in seven regular season games and averaging 3.1 points per game. Shields also appeared in three playoff games during the Shock's title run, scoring two points.

Shields was traded to the Atlanta Dream before the 2009 season, but was waived before play began.

As of June 2023, Shields has yet to return to WNBA after being waived by the Dream in 2009.

== Overseas career ==
Shields signed with Israeli women's team Elitzur-Maccabi Netanya in 2008, and became the leading scorer in the Israeli women's league. In 2011, she left the team to join Dobri Anjeli Kosice in Slovakia.

== Coaching career ==
Since 2024, Shields has been an assistant coach with the Mississippi Valley State Devilettes.

== Career statistics ==
=== WNBA career statistics ===
Legend
| GP | Games played | GS | Games started | MPG | Minutes per game | RPG | Rebounds per game |
| APG | Assists per game | SPG | Steals per game | BPG | Blocks per game | PPG | Points per game |
| TO | Turnovers per game | FG% | Field-goal percentage | 3P% | 3-point field-goal percentage | FT% | Free-throw percentage |
| **Bold** | Career best | ° | League leader |

==== Regular season ====
| Year | Team | GP | GS | MPG | FG% | 3P% | FT% | RPG | APG | SPG | BPG | TO | PPG |
|---|---|---|---|---|---|---|---|---|---|---|---|---|---|
| 2007 | Houston | **26** | 0 | **11.7** | 27.5 | **38.9** | 74.0 | **1.3** | **0.8** | **0.4** | 0.0 | 1.7 | **5.3** |
| 2008 | Houston | 3 | 0 | 4.0 | 0.0 | 0.0 | 50.0 | 0.0 | 0.3 | 0.3 | 0.0 | **0.3** | 0.7 |
| 2008 | Detroit | 7 | 0 | 6.3 | **36.4** | 33.3 | **75.0** | 0.4 | 0.3 | 0.1 | 0.0 | 0.9 | 3.1 |
| Career | 1 year, 3 teams | 36 | 0 | 10.0 | 27.5 | 34.5 | 72.8 | 1.0 | 0.6 | 0.3 | 0.0 | 1.4 | 4.5 |
