= 2008 WNBA Finals =

Sports tournament

Team	Coach	Wins
Detroit Shock	Bill Laimbeer	3
San Antonio Silver Stars	Dan Hughes	0
- Dates: October 1 - 5
- MVP: Katie Smith (Detroit Shock)
- Hall of Famers: Shock: Katie Smith (2018); Silver Stars: Becky Hammon (2023)
- Eastern finals: Detroit defeated New York, 2–1
- Western finals: San Antonio defeated Los Angeles, 2–1

The 2008 WNBA Finals was the championship series of the 2008 WNBA season, and the conclusion of the season's playoffs. The Detroit Shock, top-seeded champions of the Eastern Conference, defeated the San Antonio Silver Stars, top-seeded champions of the Western Conference, three games to none in a best-of-five series. This was Detroit's third title in six years.

2008 marked the first time since switching to a five-game format that the Finals series was swept. The Shock made their fourth appearance in the Finals in six years. The Silver Stars appeared in the Finals for the first time in franchise history.

Going into the series, the Shock had won two championships, tied with the Los Angeles Sparks for second most in WNBA history.

The Silver Stars' 24–10 record gave them home court advantage over Detroit (22–12). It did not matter, however, as the Shock swept the series, winning the first two games on the Silver Stars' home floor.

== Road to the finals ==
San Antonio Silver Stars		Detroit Shock
24–10 (.706); 1st West, 1st overall	Regular season	22–12 (.647); 1st East, 2nd overall
Defeated the (4) Sacramento Monarchs, 2–1	Conference Semifinals	Defeated the (4) Indiana Fever, 2–1
Defeated the (3) Los Angeles Sparks, 2–1	Conference Finals	Defeated the (3) New York Liberty, 2–1

=== Regular season series ===
The San Antonio Silver Stars won both games in the regular season series:

July 1

Recap

Detroit Shock 72, San Antonio Silver Stars 79

AT&T Center, San Antonio

July 17

Recap

San Antonio Silver Stars 76, Detroit Shock 64

Palace of Auburn Hills, Auburn Hills

== Game summaries ==
All times listed below are Eastern Daylight Time.

=== Game 1 ===
ESPN2

October 1
7:00pm

Recap

Detroit Shock 77, San Antonio Silver Stars 69
Scoring by quarter: 15–18, 27–14, 17–17, 18–20
Pts: Smith 25; Rebs: Smith 9 Asts: Hornbuckle 5 Stls: Hornbuckle 3	Pts: Young 21; Rebs: Young 9 Asts: Hammon 5 Blocks: Wauters 3
Detroit leads series, 1–0

AT&T Center, San Antonio
Attendance: 9,380
Referees:
- #22 Corteau
- #38 Simpson
- #42 Gulbeyan

The Silver Stars' defense was able to hold Deanna Nolan to just 10 points in forty minutes of play. But they had no answer for Katie Smith (25 points, 4–8 3P-FG) or Taj McWilliams-Franklin (24 points, 65% FG).

The Silver Stars, who lost to an Eastern Conference team for the first time all season after 14 wins, were led by Sophia Young's 21 points and 16 from Ann Wauters.

Detroit didn't get its first lead until 2:19 into the second quarter when Smith made two free throws to go up 21–20 before the Shock outscored San Antonio 21-12 the rest of the half for the double-digit margin.

The Silver Stars went cold, shooting 4-of-16 in the second quarter. San Antonio played without key reserves Helen Darling and Edwige Lawson-Wade. Darling strained her right calf and Lawson-Wade sprained her right ankle during Saturday's Game 2 victory over Los Angeles in the Western Conference semifinals.

Detroit, already without All-Star forward Cheryl Ford, missed Plenette Pierson for the third time in the last five games because of a labrum tear in her right shoulder.

=== Game 2 ===
ESPN2

October 3
7:00 pm

Recap

Detroit Shock 69, San Antonio Silver Stars 61
Scoring by quarter: 25–12, 10–16, 13–17, 21–16
Pts: Smith 22; Rebs: Nolan 7 Asts: Smith 6 Stls: Nolan 4	Pts: Hammon 24; Rebs: Johnson, Wauters 6 Asts: Hammon 7; 3P-FG: Hammon 3-6
Detroit leads series, 2–0

AT&T Center, San Antonio
Attendance: 16,012
Referees:
- #9 Brooks-Clauser
- #18 Walker
- #55 Brewton

Katie Smith scored 22 points and the Shock built a big lead in the first quarter, then hung on to beat the San Antonio Silver Stars 69–61 and go up 2–0. Deanna Nolan and Kara Braxton added 12 points each for the Shock, who led 19–2 less than 6 minutes into the game.

Detroit made nine of its first 10 shots and San Antonio missed its first seven attempts, allowing the Shock to build a 10–0 lead. The Silver Stars didn't score from the floor until 5:57 into the game, when Hammon converted on a drive to the basket that made it 19–4.

The Silver Stars tied the game with 3:26 left in the third quarter on a pair of free throws by Hammon, and she put San Antonio ahead 45–44 with 1:46 left in the quarter on another pair of free throws. Plenette Pierson, wearing a protective wrap on her shoulder after missing Game 1 with an injury, answered with a reverse layup for her only points of the night. Smith followed with two free throws that gave Detroit a 48–45 lead heading into the fourth quarter. The Shock expanded the lead to 66–55 with 2:15 to play after Smith hit a 10-foot jumper, Taj McWilliams-Franklin scored on a 17-footer and Braxton made a layup.

=== Game 3 ===
ESPN2

October 5
7:00 pm

Recap

San Antonio Silver Stars 60, Detroit Shock 76
Scoring by quarter: 16–16, 18–14, 11–19, 15–27
Pts: Wauters 19; Rebs: Wauters 9 Asts: Hammon, Wauters 3 FG: Young 7/12	Pts: Smith 18; Rebs: Braxton, Hornbuckle 9 Asts: Hornbuckle, Nolan 5 OR: Braxton 6
Detroit wins WNBA Finals, 3–0

EMU Convocation Center, Ypsilanti
Attendance: 8,952
Referees:
- #7 Stevens
- #22 Corteau
- #39 Price

Detroit became the second team in league history to win a third championship. Only the Houston Comets, who won the first four (1997–2000), have more. Los Angeles (2001, 2002) is the only other team with more than one. It was a redeeming win for the Shock, who let the 2007 title slip away, losing Game 5 at The Palace of Auburn Hills to the Phoenix Mercury.

Detroit swept the league's best regular-season team, winning the clincher at the Eastern Michigan University Convocation Center, a venue forced upon them because of a scheduling conflict. The Shock won their 2003 championship at The Palace and their '06 title at Detroit's Joe Louis Arena, also a substitute venue because of a logistical conflict.

The game was tight for three quarters with San Antonio leading by six on several occasions. But the veteran Shock were too much to take in the fourth with the title on the line. The Shock had been one of the league's best teams for much of the year, but sputtered a bit after losing top post player Cheryl Ford to a season-ending knee injury in July.

But a trade for the veteran McWilliams-Franklin over the Olympic break was just what Detroit needed. It won its last five games of the regular season and six of seven after the monthlong Olympic break and carried the momentum into the playoffs.

The Shock are now considered the second dynasty of the WNBA.

== Awards ==
- 2008 WNBA champion: Detroit Shock
- Finals MVP: Katie Smith

== Rosters ==
2008 Detroit Shock Finals roster
Players
Coaches

Pos.	No.	Nat.	Name	Height	Weight	From
C	45	(United States)	Braxton, Kara	6' 6" (1.98m)	210 lb (95kg)	Georgia
PF	35	(United States)	Ford, Cheryl (injured)	6' 3" (1.91m)	198 lb (90kg)	Louisiana Tech
SG	22	(United States)	Hornbuckle, Alexis	5' 11" (1.8m)	155 lb (70kg)	Tennessee
PF	44	(United States)	McWilliams-Franklin, Taj	6' 2" (1.88m)	184 lb (83kg)	St. Edward's University
SG	14	(United States)	Nolan, Deanna	5' 11" (1.8m)	144 lb (65kg)	Georgia
SF	23	(United States)	Pierson, Plenette	6' 2" (1.88m)	181 lb (82kg)	Texas Tech
PG	5	(United States)	Powell, Elaine	5' 8" (1.73m)	150 lb (68kg)	LSU
G/F	55	(United States)	Sam, Sheri	6' 0" (1.83m)	160 lb (73kg)	Vanderbilt
C	24	(United States)	Sanni, Olayinka	6' 2" (1.88m)	205 lb (93kg)	West Virginia
C	11	(United States)	Schumacher, Kelly	6' 5" (1.96m)	183 lb (83kg)	Connecticut
SG	3	(United States)	Shields, Ashley	5' 10" (1.78m)	155 lb (70kg)	Southwest Tennessee Community College
G/F	30	(United States)	Smith, Katie	5' 11" (1.8m)	174 lb (79kg)	Ohio State

Head coach
(United States) Bill Laimbeer (Notre Dame)
Assistant coaches
(United States) Rick Mahorn (Hampton)
(United States) Cheryl Reeve (La Salle)
Athletic trainer
(United States) Laura Ramus (Wayne State (MI))
Strength and conditioning coach
(United States) Laura Ramus (Wayne State (MI))

Legend

- (C) Team captain
- (DP) Unsigned draft pick
- (FA) Free agent
- (S) Suspended
- Injured

2008 San Antonio Silver Stars Finals roster
Players
Coaches

Pos.	No.	Nat.	Name	Height	Weight	From
G/F	24	(United States)	Atunrase, Morenike	5' 10" (1.78m)	143 lb (65kg)	Texas A&M
SF	7	(United States)	Buescher, Erin	6' 3" (1.91m)	181 lb (82kg)	Master's College
SG	5	(United States)	Crossley, Shanna (injured)	5' 10" (1.78m)	155 lb (70kg)	Tennessee
PG	30	(United States)	Darling, Helen	5' 6" (1.68m)	164 lb (74kg)	Penn State
PG	25	(United States)	Hammon, Becky	5' 6" (1.68m)	136 lb (62kg)	Colorado State
PF	50	(United States)	Irvin, Sandora	6' 3" (1.91m)	185 lb (84kg)	TCU
G/F	55	(United States)	Johnson, Vickie	5' 9" (1.75m)	150 lb (68kg)	Louisiana Tech
SG	9	(France)	Lawson-Wade, Edwige	5' 6" (1.68m)	130 lb (59kg)	France
C	00	(United States)	Riley, Ruth	6' 5" (1.96m)	198 lb (90kg)	Notre Dame
SG	32	(United States)	Ross, Adrianne	5' 8" (1.73m)	142 lb (64kg)	TCU
C	12	(Belgium)	Wauters, Ann	6' 4" (1.93m)	193 lb (88kg)	Belgium
C	51	(United States)	Wilkins, Brittany	6' 3" (1.91m)	185 lb (84kg)	Iowa State
PF	33	(United States)	Young, Sophia	6' 1" (1.85m)	165 lb (75kg)	Baylor

Head coach
(United States) Dan Hughes (Muskingum)
Assistant coaches
(Australia) Sandy Brondello (Australia)
(United States) Olaf Lange
(United States) Vanessa Nygaard
Athletic trainer
(United States) Tonya Holley (St. Andrew's Presbyterian)
Strength and conditioning coach
(United States) Mike Ekanem (Texas Lutheran)

Legend

- (C) Team captain
- (DP) Unsigned draft pick
- (FA) Free agent
- (S) Suspended
- Injured
