= Deanna Nolan =

American-Russian basketball player (born 1979)

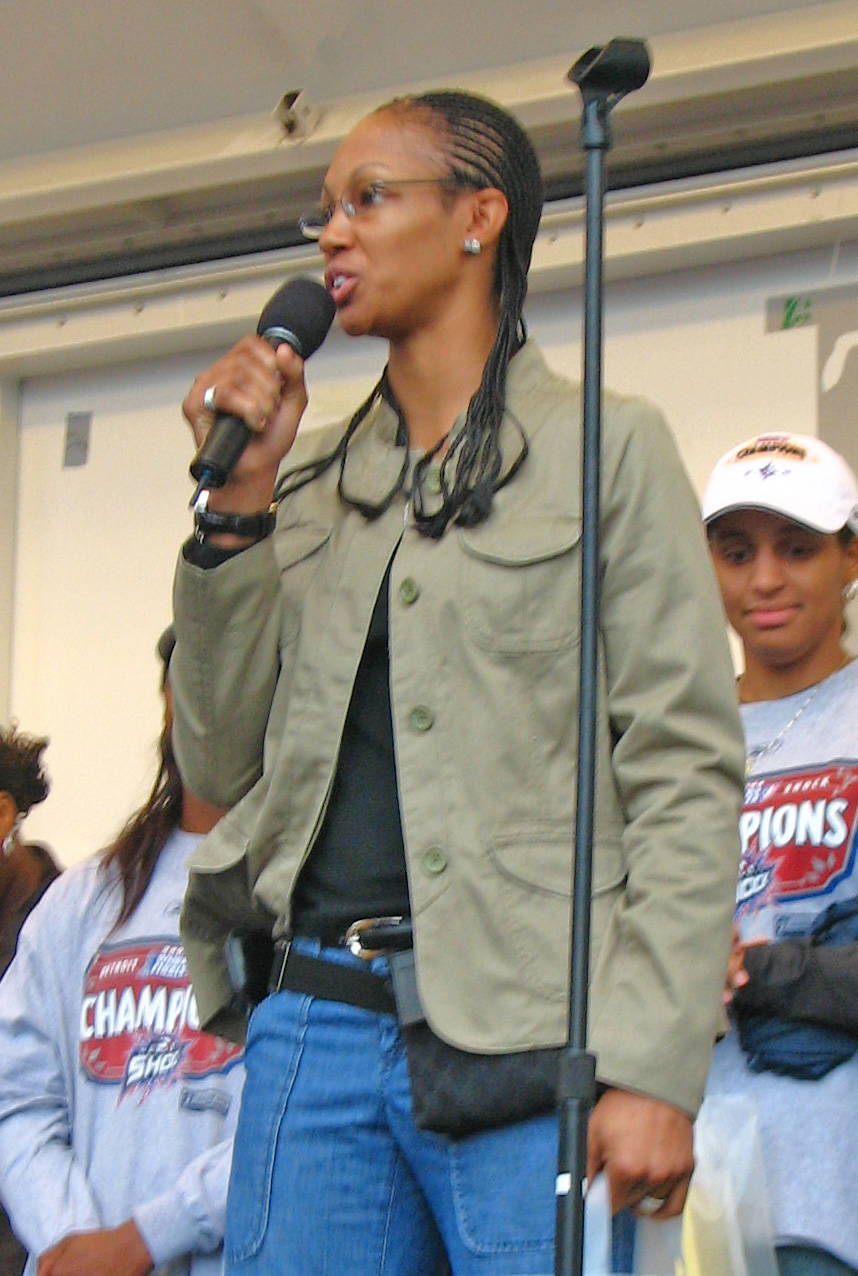

Personal information
- Born: August 25, 1979 (age 47) Flint, Michigan, U.S.
- Listed height: 5 ft 10 in (1.78 m)
- Listed weight: 155 lb (70 kg)

Career information
- High school: Flint Northern (Flint, Michigan)
- College: Georgia (1997–2001)
- WNBA draft: 2001: 1st round, 6th overall pick
- Drafted by: Detroit Shock
- Playing career: 2001–present
- Position: Shooting guard / point guard

Career history
- 2001–2009: Detroit Shock
- 2007–2010; 2012–2013: UMMC Ekaterinburg

Career highlights
- 3× WNBA champion (2003, 2006, 2008); WNBA Finals MVP (2006); 5× WNBA All-Star (2003–2007); All-WNBA First Team (2005, 2007); All-WNBA Second Team (2003); WNBA 20th Anniversary Team (2016); First-team All-SEC (2000); Michigan Miss Basketball (1996)
- Stats at WNBA.com
- Stats at Basketball Reference

Deanna Nicole "Tweety" Nolan (Russian: Деанна Нолан; born August 25, 1979) is an American-Russian former professional basketball player for UMMC Ekaterinburg of the Russian Premier League as well as the Russia women's national basketball team. Her primary position is shooting guard, but occasionally plays the point guard position. Her original name was Deana, but was legally changed to Deanna in 2000. She went to Flint Northern High School where she graduated and took that school to the state championship, which they won. Nolan was inducted in October 2024 into the Michigan Sports Hall of Fame in Detroit.

== Early life ==
Nolan attended Flint Northern High School where she led her team to back to back Michigan state championships in 1994 and 1995, and was crowned as Michigan's 1996 Miss Basketball.

== College career ==
Nolan graduated in December 2001 with a degree in child and family development from the University of Georgia. Overall, she helped the Lady Bulldogs achieve an 86–12 record overall during her collegiate career.

As a senior, Nolan earned 2001 All-SEC Tournament Team honors.

== WNBA career ==
In the 2001 WNBA draft, Nolan was selected by her home state team, Detroit Shock in the first round (sixth overall). She has been nicknamed "Tweety", and is well known by fans for her amazing vertical leap.

Nolan also helped the Detroit Shock win their first championship in 2003. In 2006, she won another championship with Detroit and was named MVP of the 2006 WNBA Finals.

In 2008, she helped the Shock win their third WNBA Championship. In 2007, 2008 and 2009, she was named the Detroit Shock Player of the Year in voting by members of the Detroit Sports Broadcasters Association.

== International career ==
In the 2007–08, 2008–09, 2009–10 and 2012–13 WNBA off seasons, she played for the UMMC Ekaterinburg club in Russia.

In the seasons 2005–06, she played for the A.S. Ramat-Hasharon club in Israel.

She obtained a Russian passport in order to not count against the team's allowed number of foreign players. She stated during 2008 that she hoped to play for the Russian Olympic team, but was passed over in favor of Becky Hammon.

== Career statistics ==
Legend
GP	Games played	GS	Games started	MPG	Minutes per game	RPG	Rebounds per game
APG	Assists per game	SPG	Steals per game	BPG	Blocks per game	PPG	Points per game
TO	Turnovers per game	FG%	Field-goal percentage	3P%	3-point field-goal percentage	FT%	Free-throw percentage
**Bold**	Career best	°	League leader

†	Denotes seasons in which Nolan won a WNBA championship

=== WNBA ===
==== Regular season ====
WNBA regular season statistics
Year	Team	GP	GS	MPG	FG%	3P%	FT%	RPG	APG	SPG	BPG	TO	PPG
2001	Detroit	27	0	20.2	33.0	28.8	81.1	2.0	1.1	0.6	0.2	**1.3**	7.1
2002	Detroit	32	32	25.1	41.5	36.8	80.6	2.7	1.9	0.8	**0.4**	1.9	8.7
2003 †	Detroit	32	32	29.8	43.6	**42.1**	79.2	3.3	2.6	1.3	**0.4**	2.2	12.4
2004	Detroit	**34**	**34**	33.5	38.2	28.9	79.8	3.9	3.3	**1.9**	**0.4**	2.6	13.6
2005	Detroit	33	33	**36.8**	39.8	31.1	80.0	**4.7**	3.7	1.7	**0.4**	3.0	15.9
2006 †	Detroit	**34**	**34**	32.1	40.5	34.5	85.0	4.5	3.6	1.4	0.3	2.5	13.8
2007	Detroit	**34**	**34**	34.6	46.0	39.3	82.3	4.4	3.9	1.4	**0.4**	2.4	16.3
2008 †	Detroit	**34**	**34**	33.6	**46.5**	37.4	**86.3**	3.9	**4.4**	1.2	0.3	2.1	15.8
2009	Detroit	33	33	33.7	40.8	32.5	78.4	4.3	3.5	1.3	0.3	2.2	**16.9**
**Career**	9 years, 1 team	293	266	31.3	41.6	34.9	81.1	3.8	3.2	1.3	0.3	2.3	13.6
**Career**	All-Star	4	1	21.7	35.2	40.9	85.7	4.0	2.8	1.0	0.0	1.8	13.3

==== Playoffs ====
WNBA playoff statistics
Year	Team	GP	GS	MPG	FG%	3P%	FT%	RPG	APG	SPG	BPG	TO	PPG
2003 †	Detroit	8	8	32.1	45.8	**44.7**	93.8	3.6	2.6	1.3	0.3	2.6	15.5
2004	Detroit	3	3	**39.7**	40.0	30.8	93.3	4.7	2.3	1.7	0.0	**1.7**	18.0
2005	Detroit	2	2	39.5	40.5	25.0	85.7	4.0	3.5	1.0	**1.0**	2.0	18.5
2006 †	Detroit	10	10	35.7	**48.6**	42.9	83.3	4.1	3.9	1.6	0.2	1.9	17.8
2007	Detroit	**11**	**11**	37.5	42.6	**44.7**	90.0	**6.3**	**4.1**	0.8	0.3	2.6	18.9
2008 †	Detroit	9	9	38.8	35.9	34.1	**93.9**	4.6	2.9	**2.1**	0.3	2.7	17.6
2009	Detroit	5	5	38.0	39.8	32.1	91.3	1.6	3.2	1.8	0.4	3.6	**21.6**
**Career**	7 years, 1 team	48	48	36.7	42.2	39.2	90.3	4.4	3.4	1.5	0.3	2.5	18.1

=== College ===
NCAA statistics
Year	Team	GP	GS	MPG	FG%	3P%	FT%	RPG	APG	SPG	BPG	TO	PPG
1998–99	Georgia	26	-	-	41.7	15.6	63.2	**4.8**	1.8	1.7	0.2	-	7.2
1999–00	Georgia	**36**	-	-	**54.8**	**37.0**	**78.7**	4.6	**3.5**	1.6	**0.8**	-	12.1
2000–01	Georgia	24	-	-	45.3	32.7	73.9	3.9	3.3	**2.0**	0.3	-	**13.4**
**Career**		86	-	-	48.5	28.9	73.0	4.5	2.9	1.7	0.5	-	11.0
