= 2007 WNBA playoffs =

Professional women's basketball tournament

- Dates: August 23 – September 16, 2007

Final positions
- Champions: Phoenix Mercury
- Runners-up: Detroit Shock

Tournament statistics
- Scoring leader (s): Cappie Pondexter (Phoenix) (23.9 PPG)

Awards
- MVP: Cappie Pondexter (Phoenix)

The 2007 WNBA playoffs was the postseason for the Women's National Basketball Association's 2007 season which ended with the Western Conference champion Phoenix Mercury defeating the Eastern Conference champion Detroit Shock 3-2.

== Format ==
- The top 4 teams from each conference qualify for the playoffs.
  - All 4 teams are seeded by basis of their standings.
- The series for rounds one and two are in a best-of-three format with Games 2 and 3 on the home court of the team with the higher seed.
- The series for the WNBA Finals is in a best-of-five format with Games 1, 2 and 5 on the home court of the team with the higher seed.
- Reseeding (as used in the Stanley Cup playoffs) is not in use: therefore, all playoff matchups are predetermined via the teams' seedings.

== Playoff qualifying ==
=== Eastern Conference ===
The following teams clinched a playoff berth in the East:

1. Detroit Shock (24–10)
2. Indiana Fever (21–13)
3. Connecticut Sun (18–16)
4. New York Liberty (16–18)

=== Western Conference ===
The following teams clinched a playoff berth in the West:

1. Phoenix Mercury (23–11)
2. San Antonio Silver Stars (20–14)
3. Sacramento Monarchs (19–15)
4. Seattle Storm (17–17)

== Bracket ==
This was the outlook for the 2007 WNBA playoffs. Teams in italics had home court advantage. Teams in bold advanced to the next round. Numbers to the left of each team indicate the team's original playoffs seeding in their respective conferences. Numbers to the right of each team indicate the number of games the team won in that round.

**First Round**; Best-of-3
1	**Detroit**	2
4	New York	1
**Eastern Conference**
2	**Indiana**	2
3	Connecticut	1
1	**Phoenix**	2
4	Seattle	0
**Western Conference**
2	**San Antonio**	2
3	Sacramento	1

**Conference Finals**; Best-of-3
1	**Detroit**	2
2	Indiana	1
1	**Phoenix**	2
2	San Antonio	0

**WNBA Finals**; Best-of-5
1	Detroit	2
1	**Phoenix**	3

- **Bold** – series winner
- Italic – team with home court advantage

== Eastern Conference ==
=== First round ===
==== (1) Detroit Shock vs. (4) New York Liberty ====
NBA TV

August 24

Game 1

Detroit Shock 51, **New York Liberty** **73**
Scoring by quarter: 9–**14**, **16**–11, 17–**28**, 9–**20**
Pts: Nolan 16; Rebs: Pierson 8 Asts: Johnson, Powell, Pierson 2	Pts: Christon 16; Rebs: Christon 15; Asts: Moore 6

Madison Square Garden, New York City
Attendance: 9,976
Referees: June Courteau, Lamont Simpson, Scott Twardoski

ABC

August 26

Game 2

New York Liberty 73, **Detroit Shock** **76**
Scoring by quarter: **20**–19, 11–**23**, **22**–18, **20**–16
Pts: Christon, McCarville 19; Rebs: Kraayeveld, Moore 8 Asts: McCarville, Moore, Thorn 3	Pts: Nolan 16; Rebs: Pierson 12; Asts: Smith 6

The Palace of Auburn Hills, Auburn Hills
Attendance: 9,896
Referees: Tina Napier, Michael Price, Kurt Walker

ESPN2

August 28

Game 3

New York Liberty 70, **Detroit Shock** **71** (OT)
Scoring by quarter: 12–12, **21**–11, 16–**20**, 13–**19**, Overtime: 8–**9**
Pts: Kraayeveld 16; Rebs: Jackson-Jones 10; Asts: Moore 6	Pts: Nolan 22; Rebs: Ford 10; Asts: Nolan 6
**Detroit wins series, 2–1**

The Palace of Auburn Hills, Auburn Hills
Attendance: 10,654
Referees: Daryl Humphrey, Lisa Mattingly, Eric Brewton

==== (2) Indiana Fever vs. (3) Connecticut Sun ====
ESPN2

August 23

Game 1

Indiana Fever 88, **Connecticut Sun** **93** (3OT)
Scoring by quarter: 7–**12**, 18–**20**, 17–**22**, **24**–12, Overtime: 9–9, 6–6, 7–**12**
Pts: DeForge 31; Rebs: Catchings 20; Asts: Catchings 7	Pts: Sales 25; Rebs: Dydek 11; Asts: Whalen 10

Mohegan Sun Arena, Uncasville
Attendance: 7,271
Referees: Bonita Spence, Daryl Humphrey, Michael Price

NBA TV

August 25

Game 2

Connecticut Sun 59, **Indiana Fever** **78**
Scoring by quarter: 13–**23**, 8–**17**, 17–**21**, **21**–17
Pts: Douglas 11; Rebs: Sales 6 Asts: Carey 4	Pts: DeForge 26; Rebs: Catchings 13; Asts: White, Whitmore 4

Conseco Fieldhouse, Indianapolis
Attendance: 7,298
Referees: Bob Trammell, Roy Gulbeyan, Cameron Inouye

NBA TV

August 27

Game 3

Connecticut Sun 88, **Indiana Fever** **93** (OT)
Scoring by quarter: **29**–17, 15–15, 16–16, 17–**29**, Overtime: 11–**16**
Pts: Douglas 27; Rebs: Whalen 10; Asts: Douglas, Jones 5	Pts: Catchings 30; Rebs: Catchings 13; Asts: Catchings 6
**Indiana wins series, 2–1**

Conseco Fieldhouse, Indianapolis
Attendance: 6,012
Referees: Sue Blauch, Tina Napier, Kurt Walker

=== Conference finals ===
==== (1) Detroit Shock vs. (2) Indiana Fever ====
ESPN2

August 31

Game 1

Detroit Shock 65, **Indiana Fever** **75**
Scoring by quarter: 13–**15**, 18–18, 23–**26**, 11–**16**
Pts: Pierson 19; Rebs: Ford 11; Asts: Nolan 6	Pts: Catchings 22; Rebs: Catchings 11; Asts: Bevilaqua 4

Conseco Fieldhouse, Indianapolis
Attendance: 9,623
Referees: Clarke Stevens, June Courteau, Lamont Simpson

ABC

September 2

Game 2

Indiana Fever 63, **Detroit Shock** **77**
Scoring by quarter: **20**–16, 12–**25**, 15–**27**, **16**–9
Pts: DeForge 13; Rebs: Catchings, DeForge, Sam 4 Asts: Whitmore 4	Pts: Nolan 24; Rebs: Cash, Pierson 9 Asts: Nolan, Smith 6

The Palace of Auburn Hills, Auburn Hills
Attendance: 10,153
Referees: Bob Trammell, Sue Blauch, Kurt Walker

NBATV

September 3

Game 3

Indiana Fever 65, **Detroit Shock** **81**
Scoring by quarter: **20**–14, 10–**21**, 17–**22**, 18–**24**
Pts: Sutton-Brown 17; Rebs: Sutton-Brown, Sam 10; Asts: Sam, Whitmore 4	Pts: Nolan 30; Rebs: Ford 15; Asts: Smith 7
**Detroit wins series, 2–1**

The Palace of Auburn Hills, Auburn Hills
Attendance: 9,856
Referees: Michael Price, Tina Napier, Lisa Mattingly

== Western Conference ==
=== First round ===
==== (1) Phoenix Mercury vs. (4) Seattle Storm ====
NBA TV

August 24

Game 1

**Phoenix Mercury** **101**, Seattle Storm 84
Scoring by quarter: **25**–20, **20**–13, **29**–24, 27–27
Pts: Taylor, Taurasi 22; Rebs: Smith 10; Asts: Pondexter 8	Pts: Lennox 23; Rebs: Jackson 9 Asts: Bird 4

KeyArena, Seattle
Attendance: 8,833
Referees: Tina Napier, Kurt Walker, Barb Smith

NBA TV

August 26

Game 2

Seattle Storm 89, **Phoenix Mercury** **95**
Scoring by quarter: 14–**27**, 24–24, 25–25, **26**–19
Pts: Jackson 22; Rebs: Jackson 14; Asts: Bird 6	Pts: Pondexter 25; Rebs: Smith 8 Asts: Taurasi 6
**Phoenix wins series, 2-0**

US Airways Center, Phoenix
Attendance: 7,428
Referees: June Courteau, Lamont Simpson, Daryl Humphrey

==== (2) San Antonio Silver Stars vs. (3) Sacramento Monarchs ====
NBA TV

August 23

Game 1

San Antonio Silver Stars 65, **Sacramento Monarchs** **86**
Scoring by quarter: 14–**24**, **20**–14, 16–**25**, 15–**23**
Pts: Young 20; Rebs: Young 8 Asts: Darling 5	Pts: Powell 22; Rebs: Griffith 9 Asts: Penicheiro 7

ARCO Arena, Sacramento
Attendance: 10,126
Referees: Bob Trammell, Denise Brooks, Sue Blauch

ESPN2

August 25

Game 2

Sacramento Monarchs 61, **San Antonio Silver Stars** **86**
Scoring by quarter: 11–**18**, 14–**25**, 14–**18**, 22–**25**
Pts: Brunson 18; Rebs: Brunson 8 Asts: Penicheiro 5	Pts: Hammon 20; Rebs: Johnson 9 Asts: Johnson 8

AT&T Center, San Antonio
Attendance: 5,735
Referees: Eric Brewton, Lisa Mattingly, Clarke Stevens

NBATV

August 27

Game 3

Sacramento Monarchs 78, **San Antonio Silver Stars** **80**
Scoring by quarter: 21–**27**, 15–**22**, **19**–17, **23**–14
Pts: Powell 20; Rebs: Brunson 8 Asts: Lawson 5	Pts: Young 26; Rebs: Darling 7 Asts: Hammon, Johnson 7
**San Antonio wins series, 2–1**

AT&T Center, San Antonio
Attendance: 7,126
Referees: June Courteau, Lamont Simpson, Roy Gulbeyan

=== Conference finals ===
==== (1) Phoenix Mercury vs. (2) San Antonio Silver Stars ====
NBA TV

August 30

Game 1

**Phoenix Mercury** **102**, San Antonio Silver Stars 100
Scoring by quarter: 20–20, **30**–27, **23**–22, 29–31
Pts: Pondexter 26; Rebs: Taylor 14; Asts: Pondexter 6	Pts: Hammon 32; Rebs: Young 18; Asts: Riley 6

AT&T Center, San Antonio
Attendance: 14,592
Referees: Lisa Mattingly, Denise Brooks, Bob Trammell

NBA TV

September 1

Game 2

San Antonio Silver Stars 92, **Phoenix Mercury** **98**
Scoring by quarter: **28**–23, 19–19, 20–**25**, 25–**31**
Pts: Zolman 20; Rebs: Riley, Young 10; Asts: Hammon 8	Pts: Pondexter 33; Rebs: Smith 12; Asts: Pondexter 8
**Phoenix wins series, 2-0**

US Airways Center, Phoenix
Attendance: 8,106
Referees: Tina Napier, Michael Price, Roy Gulbeyan

== WNBA Finals ==
=== Phoenix Mercury vs. Detroit Shock ===
ESPN2

September 5

Game 1

Phoenix Mercury 100, **Detroit Shock** **108**
Scoring by quarter: **21**–18, 14–**23**, **32**–28, 33–**39**
Pts: Taylor 57; Rebs: Taylor 9 Asts: Taylor 7	Pts: Pierson 26; Rebs: Braxton 12; Asts: Johnson, Smith 4

The Palace of Auburn Hills, Auburn Hills
Attendance: 10,513
Referees: Eric Brewton, June Courteau, Lamont Simpson

ESPN2

September 8

Game 2

**Phoenix Mercury** **98**, Detroit Shock 70
Scoring by quarter: **25**–17, **23**–15, **31**–19, 19–19
Pts: Taurasi 30; Rebs: Smith 10; Asts: Miller, Pondexter, Taylor 5	Pts: Nolan 12; Rebs: Braxton 9 Asts: Johnson, Pierson 3

The Palace of Auburn Hills, Auburn Hills
Attendance: 16,752
Referees: Lisa Mattingly, Michael Price, Kurt Walker

ESPN2

September 11

Game 3

**Detroit Shock** **88**, Phoenix Mercury 83
Scoring by quarter: **30**–23, 20–**22**, **20**–19, 18–**19**
Pts: Smith 22; Rebs: Ford 13; Asts: Nolan 6	Pts: Taurasi 22; Rebs: Taylor 14; Asts: Miller 5

US Airways Center, Phoenix
Attendance: 12,024
Referees: Daryl Humphrey, Bob Trammell, Tina Napier

ESPN2

September 13

Game 4

Detroit Shock 76, **Phoenix Mercury** **77**
Scoring by quarter: 12–**17**, **23**–16, **25**–24, 16–**20**
Pts: Pierson 23; Rebs: Ford 14; Asts: Nolan 5	Pts: Pondexter 26; Rebs: Taylor 9 Asts: Pondexter 5

US Airways Center, Phoenix
Attendance: 12,813
Referees: June Courteau, Kurt Walker, Lamont Simpson

ESPN2

September 16

Game 5

**Phoenix Mercury** **108**, Detroit Shock 92
Scoring by quarter: **30**–17, 25–**26**, **24**–21, **29**–28
Pts: Taylor 30; Rebs: Taurasi 7 Asts: Pondexter 10	Pts: Nolan 27; Rebs: Smith 6 Asts: Johnson 8
**Phoenix won series, 3-2**

The Palace of Auburn Hills, Auburn Hills
Attendance: 22,076
Referees: Tina Napier, Michael Price, Bob Trammell
