= Plenette Pierson =

American basketball player (born 1981)

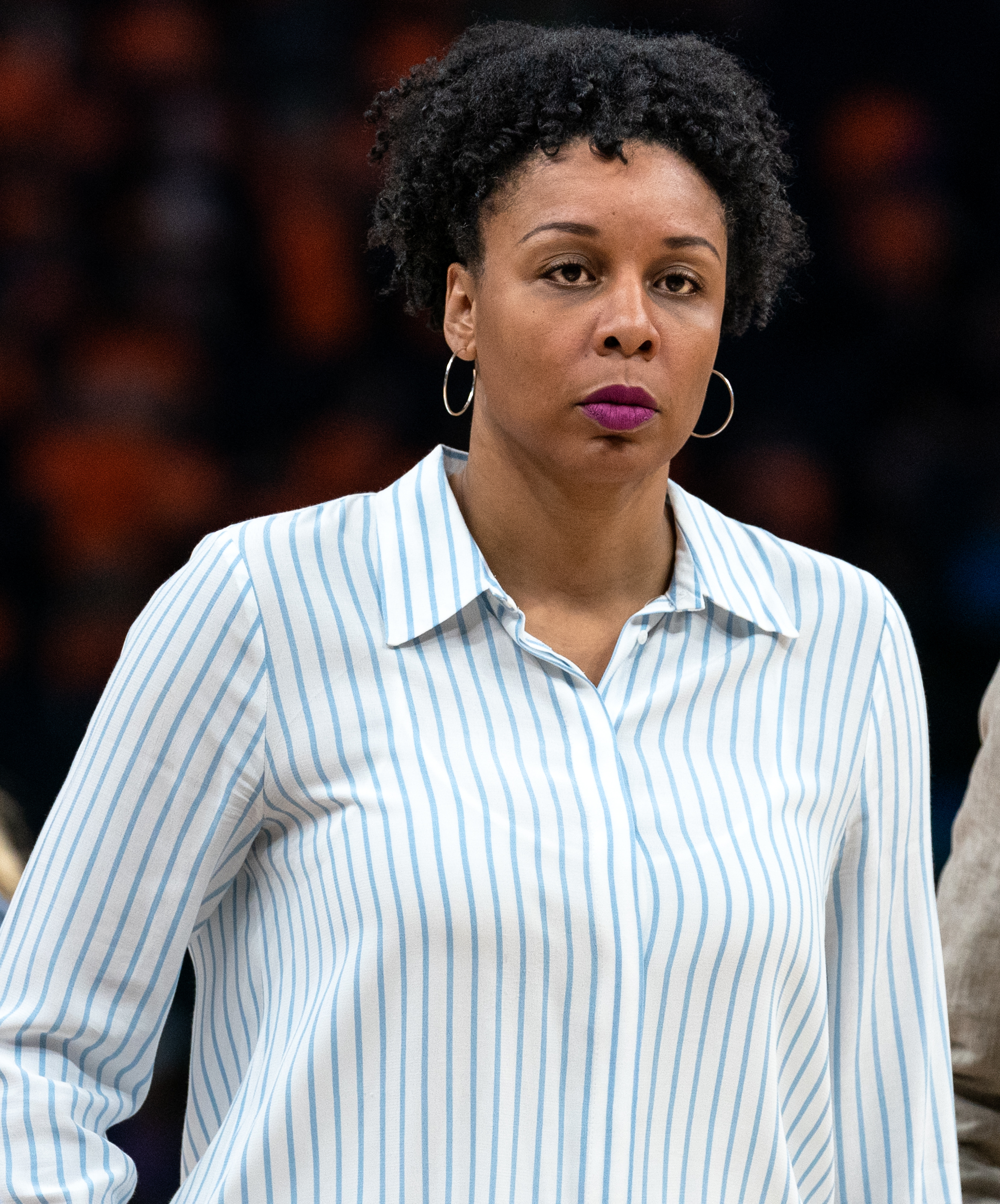
- Pierson in 2019

Texas Tech Red Raiders
- Title: Assistant coach
- League: Big 12

Personal information
- Born: August 31, 1981 (age 45) Houston, Texas, U.S.
- Listed height: 6 ft 2 in (1.88 m)
- Listed weight: 195 lb (88 kg)

Career information
- High school: Kingwood (Kingwood, Texas)
- College: Texas Tech (1999–2003)
- WNBA draft: 2003: 1st round, 4th overall pick
- Drafted by: Phoenix Mercury
- Playing career: 2003–2017
- Position: Power forward / center
- Number: 54, 23, 33, 22
- Coaching career: 2019–present

Career history

Playing
- 2003–2005: Phoenix Mercury
- 2005–2006: Coconuda Maddaloni
- 2006–2010: Detroit / Tulsa Shock
- 2006–2007: Elitzur Ramla
- 2007–2009: Dynamo Moscow
- 2010–2014: New York Liberty
- 2010–2011: Tarsus Belediyesi
- 2011–2012: Maccabi Bnot Ashdod
- 2012–2014: Good Angels Košice
- 2014–2015: Cheongju KB Stars
- 2015–2016: Tulsa Shock / Dallas Wings
- 2016–2017: Cheongju KB Stars
- 2017: Minnesota Lynx

Coaching
- 2019–2022: Minnesota Lynx (assistant)
- 2022–present: Texas Tech (assistant)

Career highlights
- 3× WNBA champion (2006, 2008, 2017); WNBA All-Star (2015); WNBA Sixth Woman of the Year (2007); Israeli National League champion (2012); Slovak National League champion (2013); Third-team All-American – AP (2003); First-team All-Big 12 (2003); Big 12 Freshman of the Year (2000)
- Stats at WNBA.com
- Stats at Basketball Reference

Plenette Michelle Pierson (born August 31, 1981) is an American former professional basketball player who last played for the Minnesota Lynx of the Women's National Basketball Association (WNBA). In the 2007 season, Pierson won the first ever Sixth Woman of the Year Award given in the WNBA. Pierson is currently an assistant coach at Texas Tech.

== College career ==
Pierson played college basketball for the Texas Tech Red Raiders women's basketball team. She graduated in 2003.

=== Texas Tech statistics ===
Legend
GP	Games played	GS	Games started	MPG	Minutes per game
FG%	Field goal percentage	3P%	3-point field goal percentage	FT%	Free throw percentage
RPG	Rebounds per game	APG	Assists per game	SPG	Steals per game
BPG	Blocks per game	PPG	Points per game	**Bold**	Career high

Year	Team	GP	Points	FG%	3P%	FT%	RPG	APG	SPG	BPG	PPG
1999-00	Texas Tech	33	449	50.6	-	56.9	6.9	0.6	1.0	0.8	13.6
2000-01	Texas Tech	32	471	49.6	0.0	63.9	7.4	1.1	1.3	**1.3**	14.7
2001-02	Texas Tech	4	58	41.8	-	**66.7**	**9.0**	**2.5**	**1.8**	0.5	14.5
2002-03	Texas Tech	**35**	**624**	**51.0**	-	63.5	8.1	1.5	1.5	**1.3**	**17.8**
Career		104	1602	50.0	0.0	61.8	7.6	1.1	1.3	1.1	15.4

== Professional career ==
=== WNBA ===
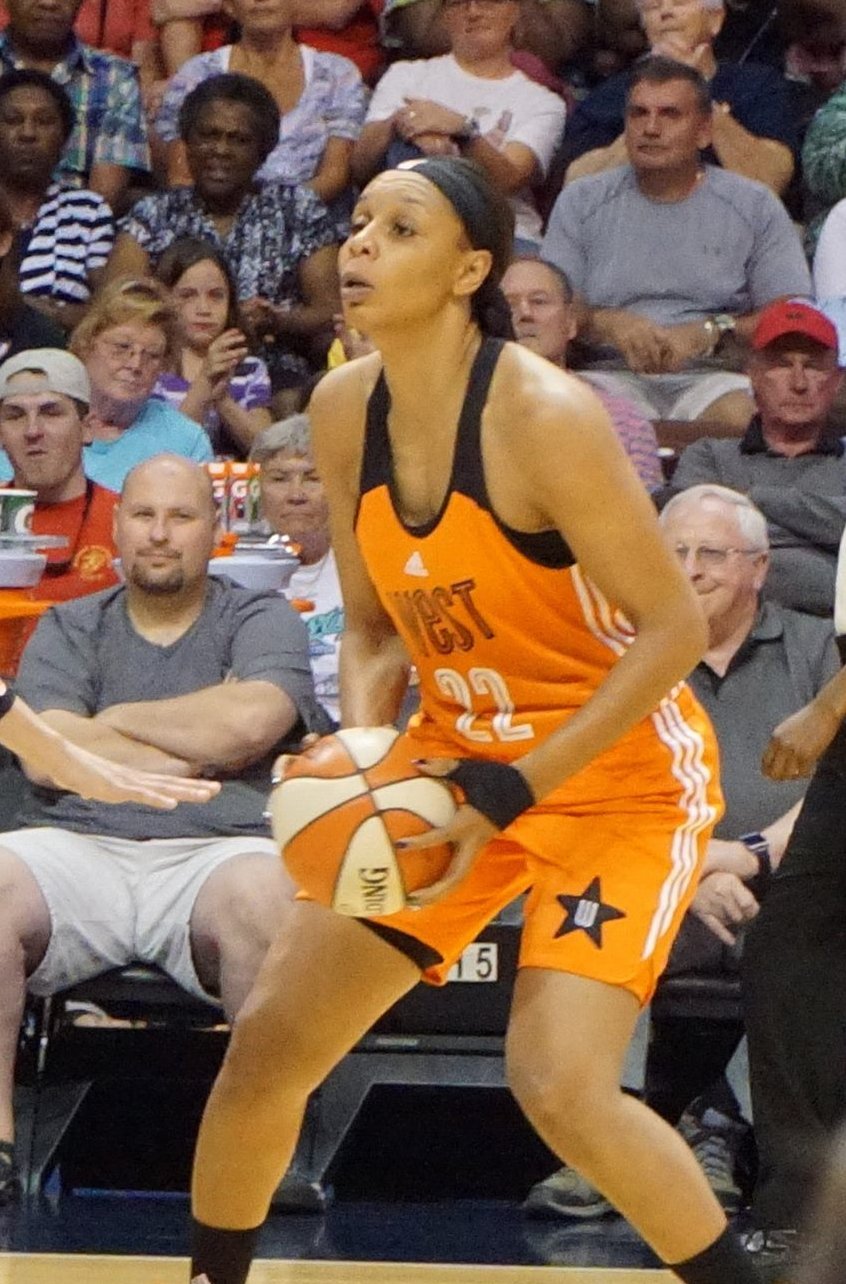
Pierson during the 2015 WNBA All Star game

Pierson was drafted fourth overall by the Phoenix Mercury in 2003 WNBA draft. Midway through the 2005 season, Pierson was traded to the Detroit Shock. In the 2006 season, the Shock were a championship contender as they finished second in the Eastern Conference with a 23–11 record. They would advance all the way to the finals and defeat the Sacramento Monarchs in five games. The following season, Pierson would win the first ever WNBA Sixth Woman of the Year Award given by the league for her scoring and rebounding efforts off the bench, averaging 11.9 points per game and 5.8 rebounds per game. Coinciding with her efforts, the Shock were in the hunt to win back-to-back championships with the number one seed in the eastern conference and another trip to the Finals, but were defeated by the Phoenix Mercury in five-game series. The following season, the Shock made it to the Finals for the third year in a row, this time winning their second championship in three years, after sweeping the San Antonio Silver Stars in the Finals. However, the following season, Pierson would only play one game and missed the rest of the season due to a shoulder injury.

In 2010, the Detroit Shock franchise relocated to Tulsa, Oklahoma and were renamed the Tulsa Shock. In the 2010 season, Pierson would play 8 games for the Shock before being traded to the New York Liberty where she played for the rest of the season. In the 2011 season, Pierson averaged a career-high in scoring with 12.9 points per game in the Liberty's starting lineup. She would continue to play with Liberty until 2014.

In 2015, Pierson returned to the Tulsa Shock in free agency. She played 30 games with 29 starts, averaged 12.8 points per game and was voted as an all-star for the first time in her career. In 2016, the Shock relocated to Dallas, Texas and were renamed the Dallas Wings. She played and started in 27 games and averaged 11.9 points per game.

On February 1, 2017, Pierson signed with the Minnesota Lynx in free agency. On August 18, 2017, Pierson announced that she would retire at the end of the season. During the season, Pierson would contribute off the bench for the Lynx, averaging 5.2 points per game. The Lynx finished with the best record in the league with a 27–7 record, earning the number 1 seed and a double-bye to the WNBA semi-finals. The Lynx would eliminate the Washington Mystics in a 3-game sweep of the WNBA semi-finals and would advance to the 2017 WNBA Finals, making it Pierson's fourth career Finals appearance. The Lynx would defeat the Los Angeles Sparks in 5 games to avenge last season's Finals loss, as Pierson won her third WNBA championship.

=== Overseas ===
In the 2005-06 WNBA off-season, Pierson played in Italy for Coconuda Maddaloni. In the 2006-07 WNBA off-season, Pierson played in Israel for Elitzur Ramla. In the 2007-08 WNBA off-season, Pierson played in Russia for Dynamo Moscow. In the 2011-12 WNBA off-season, Pierson played in Israel for Maccabi Bnot Ashdod. From 2012 to 2014, Pierson played two off-seasons in Slovakia for Good Angels Košice. In the 2014-15 WNBA off-season, Pierson played in Italy for Passalacqua Ragusa. In August 2016, Pierson signed with the Cheongju KB Stars of the Korean League for the 2016-17 WNBA off-season.

== Coaching ==
=== Lynx ===
On March 14, 2019, The Minnesota Lynx announced the hiring of Pierson as an assistant coach.

=== Texas Tech ===
On June 6, 2022, Pierson was announced as an assistant coach at her alma mater, Texas Tech. She'd leave her post as an assistant with the Lynx and would join the team immediately.

== WNBA career statistics ==
Legend
GP	Games played	GS	Games started	MPG	Minutes per game	RPG	Rebounds per game
APG	Assists per game	SPG	Steals per game	BPG	Blocks per game	PPG	Points per game
TO	Turnovers per game	FG%	Field-goal percentage	3P%	3-point field-goal percentage	FT%	Free-throw percentage
**Bold**	Career best	°	League leader

†	Denotes seasons in which Pierson won a WNBA championship

=== Regular season ===
Year	Team	GP	GS	MPG	FG%	3P%	FT%	RPG	APG	SPG	BPG	TO	PPG
2003	Phoenix	33	5	18.2	.379	.000	.634	2.4	0.7	0.5	0.3	1.2	6.0
2004	Phoenix	31	25	25.9	.443	.000	.606	4.2	0.8	0.8	0.5	1.5	9.4
2005*	Phoenix	12	11	26.5	.343	.000	.690	4.9	1.1	0.8	1.0	2.6	7.7
2005*	Detroit	17	15	19.3	.494	1.000	.476	5.5	0.5	0.5	0.2	1.8	7.7
2005	Total	23	0	19.3	.437	**.500**	.698	2.7	0.9	0.6	0.2	1.8	7.7
2006^{†}	Detroit	**34**	0	16.6	.456	.000	.700	3.9	0.7	0.5	0.4	**1.0**	6.5
2007	Detroit	**34**	0	25.2	.478	.000	.754	**5.8**	1.7	0.7	0.8	2.3	11.6
2008^{†}	Detroit	28	0	23.2	.457	.000	.752	4.9	2.3	0.8	**1.2**	1.7	11.9
2009	Detroit	1	0	5.0	.000	.000	.000	0.0	1.1	1.0	1.0	0.0	0.0
2010*	Tulsa	8	1	15.8	.535	.429	.857	2.5	1.3	1.2	0.3	1.6	12.1
2010*	New York	25	0	16.7	.458	.250	.817	3.8	1.1	0.6	0.3	1.8	9.0
2010	Total	33	1	16.5	**.479**	.364	.827	3.5	1.2	0.8	0.3	1.8	9.7
2011	New York	33	**33**	**28.6**	.478	.200	.806	5.2	1.4	**1.1**	0.9	1.8	**12.9**
2012	New York	26	24	24.7	.466	. 278	.759	5.4	2.3	0.7	0.8	2.3	12.0
2013	New York	32	27	27.6	.401	.000	.720	**5.8**	**2.5**	0.5	0.6	2.4	11.6
2014	New York	33	8	17.4	.455	.000	**.859**	3.1	1.2	0.4	0.1	1.3	7.2
2015	Tulsa	30	29	28.1	.437	.362	.808	4.1	1.9	0.9	0.4	1.8	12.8
2016	Dallas	27	27	26.6	.387	.337	.829	4.6	2.0	0.8	0.3	1.7	11.9
2017^{†}	Minnesota	**34**	4	13.7	.427	.339	.792	2.2	1.5	0.4	0.1	1.0	5.2
Career	15 years, 4 teams	444	194	22.2	.439	.302	.744	4.1	1.5	0.7	0.5	1.7	9.6

=== Postseason ===
Year	Team	GP	GS	MPG	FG%	3P%	FT%	RPG	APG	SPG	BPG	TO	PPG
2005	Detroit	2	0	10.0	.400	.000	.000	3.0	0.0	0.5	0.0	**0.0**	2.0
2006^{†}	Detroit	10	0	18.9	.426	.000	.706	5.4	1.7	0.6	0.9	1.4	8.8
2007	Detroit	**11**	1	25.5	.422	**.500**	.732	**7.2**	1.6	0.6	1.0	2.5	**11.2**
2008^{†}	Detroit	6	0	17.8	.474	.000	**.846**	3.0	1.7	0.6	0.3	1.8	7.8
2010	New York	5	**3**	20.0	.523	.333	.625	2.4	1.2	0.0	0.2	2.0	10.4
2011	New York	3	**3**	29.0	**.577**	.000	.500	4.0	2.7	**1.3**	**1.6**	2.6	10.7
2012	New York	2	2	**30.5**	.389	.000	.800	5.0	**3.0**	0.5	0.0	1.5	9.0
2015	Tulsa	2	2	26.8	.357	.333	.000	5.5	0.5	1.0	0.5	0.5	10.5
2017^{†}	Minnesota	8	0	5.4	.364	.500	.000	0.8	0.5	0.1	0.1	0.6	1.1
Career	9 years, 4 teams	49	11	19.2	.444	.364	.698	4.2	1.4	0.5	0.6	1.6	8.0

== Personal life ==
Pierson was born in Houston, Texas and grew up in nearby Kingwood, Texas. She is the daughter of Paulette Pierson and has a younger brother, Cleven and another brother Vontriel. She attended Kingwood High School, from which she graduated in 1999.
