= Detroit Shock =

Women's basketball team

- Conference: Eastern
- Leagues: WNBA
- Founded: 1998
- History: Detroit Shock (1998–2009); Tulsa Shock (2010–2015); Dallas Wings (2016–present)
- Arena: The Palace of Auburn Hills
- Location: Auburn Hills, Michigan
- Team colors: Blue, dark blue, red, silver, white
- Championships: 3 (2003, 2006, 2008)
- Conference titles: 4 (2003, 2006, 2007, 2008)
Home	Away

The Detroit Shock were a Women's National Basketball Association (WNBA) team based in Auburn Hills, Michigan. They were the 2003, 2006, and 2008 WNBA champions.

Debuting in 1998, the Shock were one of the league's first expansion franchises. They were also the first WNBA expansion franchise to win a WNBA championship. The team was the sister team of the Detroit Pistons and from 2002 to 2009 was coached by Pistons legend Bill Laimbeer.

In October 2009, the Shock were relocated to Tulsa, Oklahoma, to become the Tulsa Shock. Detroit team's roster, history, and nickname were retained. In July 2015, the Shock relocated to become the Dallas Wings.

== History ==
=== 1998–2002: The early years ===
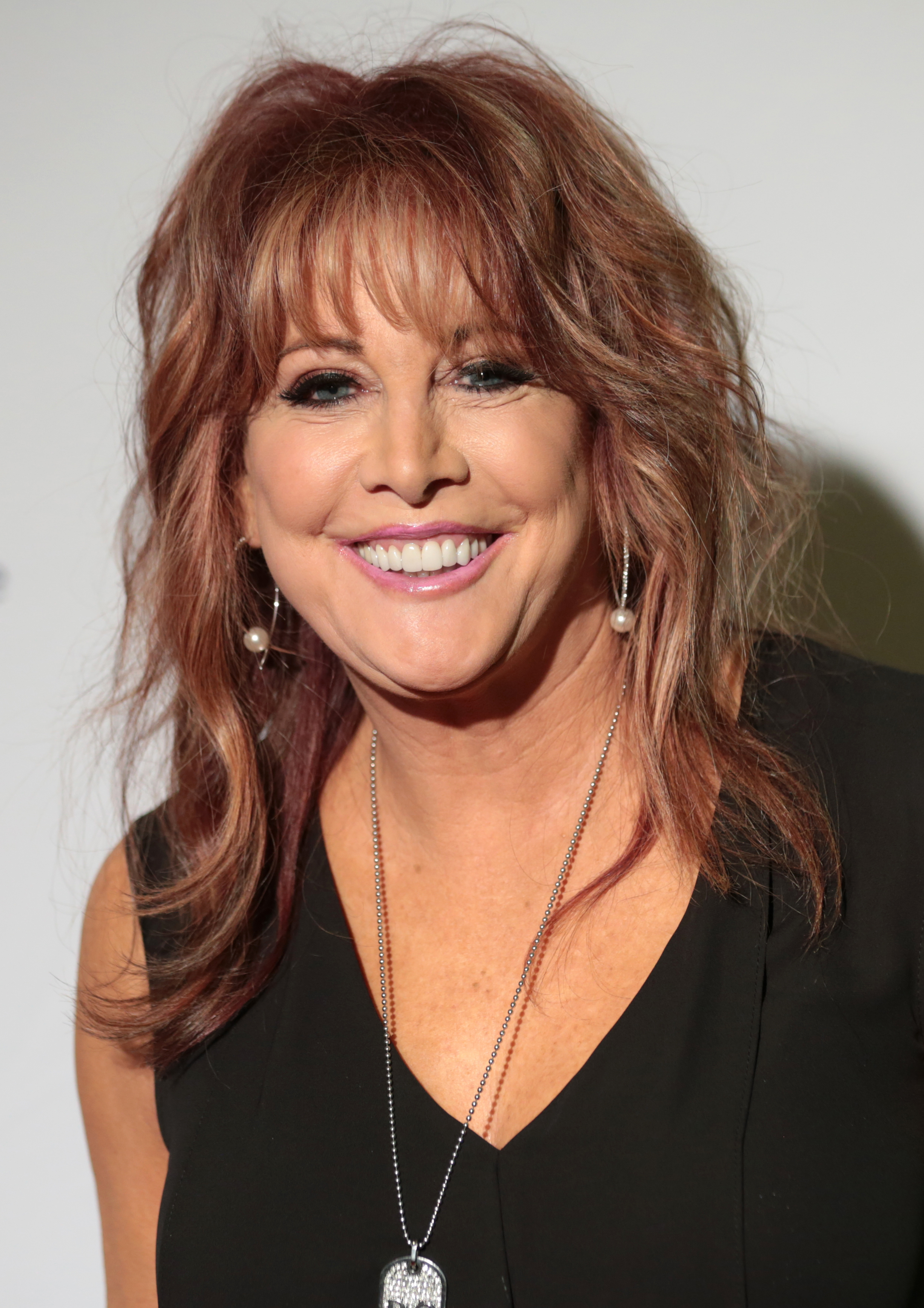
Nancy Lieberman was the first general manager and head coach in franchise history from 1998 to 2000. She also briefly played for the Shock in 2008.

The Detroit Shock were one of the first WNBA expansion teams and began play in 1998. The league held their first expansion draft for the Shock and the Washington Mystics on February 18, 1998. The Shock quickly brought in a blend of rookies and veterans. The Shock's first head coach was Hall of Famer Nancy Lieberman. The Shock started out their inaugural season 0–4, but would put together an amazing expansion season, and finish 17–13, missing out on the postseason by one game.

In 1999, the Shock finished at 15–17, which put them in a three-way tie for the playoffs with the Orlando Miracle and the Charlotte Sting. The Shock and Sting played a one-game playoff, which the Shock lost 60–54.

In 2000, the Shock finished with a 14–18 record and ended up tied for the last seed. This time, the Shock did not qualify for the playoffs as they lost the tiebreaker to the Washington Mystics. Lieberman was fired after the season and replaced by Greg Williams.

In the 2001 WNBA draft, the Shock selected Deanna Nolan with the sixth overall pick, who later developed into a star. The 2001 Shock finished the season with a 10–22 record, this time tying three teams for last place in the Eastern Conference.

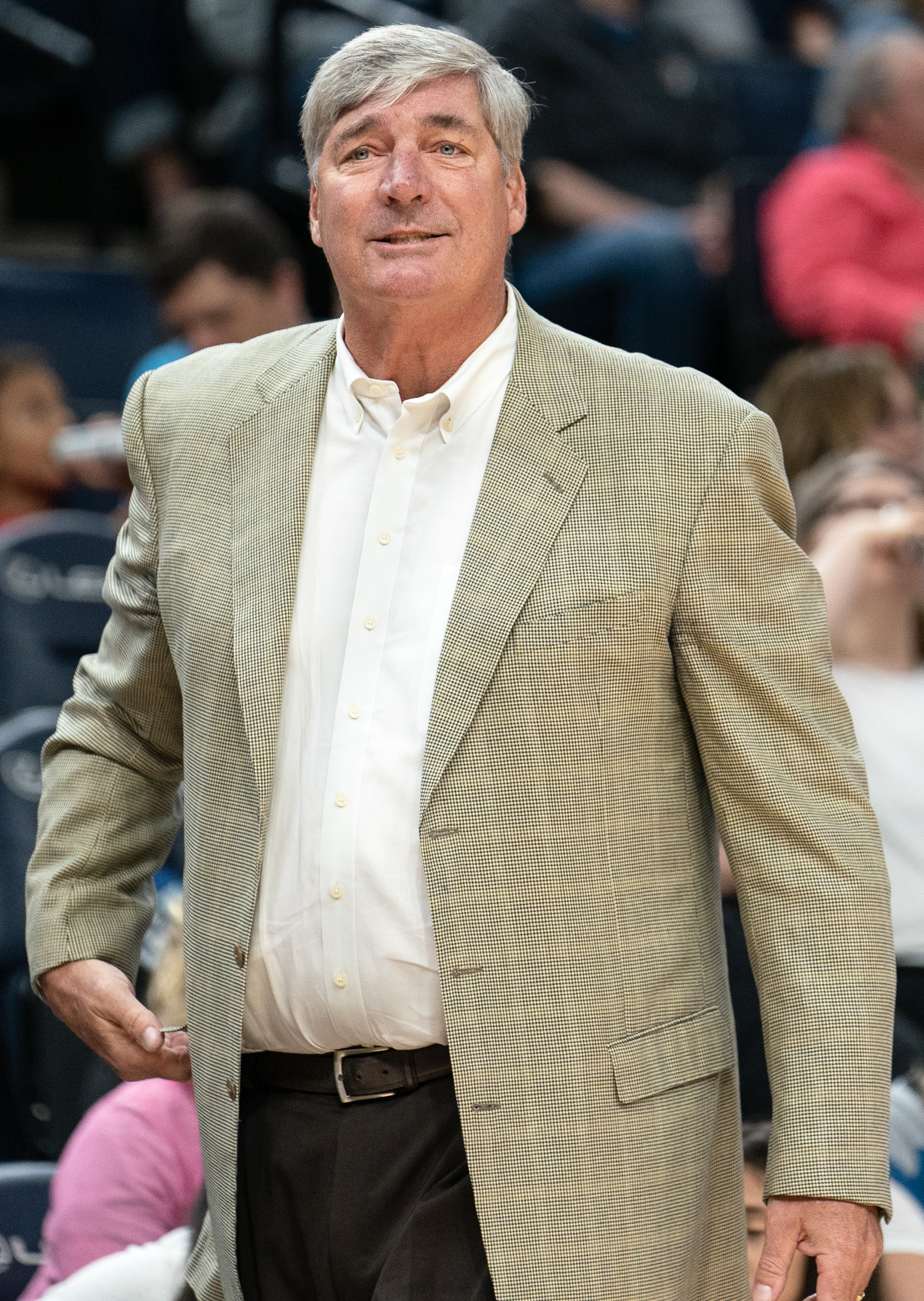
Bill Laimbeer was the general manager and head coach from 2002 to 2009, winning three WNBA championships in 2003, 2006, and 2008.

The Shock started the 2002 season 0–10, at which point Williams was fired and replaced by former Detroit Pistons legend Bill Laimbeer. The team finished the season 9–23, but Laimbeer's ideas influenced the front office, which included bringing over some new players that he felt were necessary for the Shock to become a contender.

=== 2003: From worst to champions ===
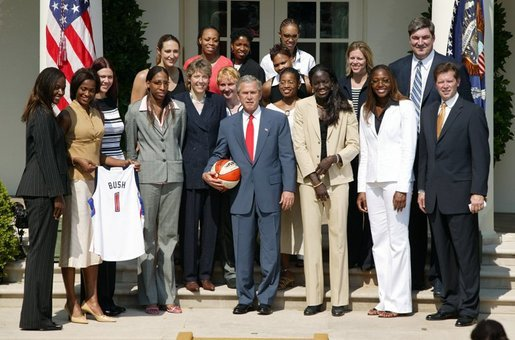
President Bush with the Shock in the White House Rose Garden in May 2004 after they won the 2003 WNBA Finals.

After massive changes to the roster, Bill Laimbeer predicted before the 2003 season that the Shock would be league champions. The Shock dominated the East in the regular season, posting a 25–9 record and winning the #1 seed by seven games. In the playoffs, the Shock defeated the Cleveland Rockers 2–1 for their first playoff series win in franchise history. In the Conference Finals, the Shock swept the Connecticut Sun 2–0 to reach the WNBA Finals. Despite the achievements, the Shock were viewed as huge underdogs to the two-time defending champion Los Angeles Sparks, who were looking for a three-peat. The Shock emerged victorious in the series, winning a thrilling Game 3 83–78. That game drew the largest crowd in WNBA history. Ruth Riley was named WNBA Finals MVP. With the win, the Shock became the first American professional sports team to go from having the worst overall record in the league to being champions in the following season.

=== 2004–2005: Return to mediocrity ===
The Shock stumbled after their championship season and played mediocre basketball in the 2004 season. The Shock posted a 17–17 record, qualifying for the playoffs as the No. 3 seed. The Shock took the series against the New York Liberty the full three games, but fell in the end 2–1.

In the offseason, former Pistons star Rick Mahorn was hired as an assistant coach. Much like the previous season, the Shock played mediocre basketball, posting a 16–18 record, which was good enough to secure the #4 seed. In the playoffs, the Shock got swept by the Connecticut Sun.

=== 2006–2008: Back to the top ===
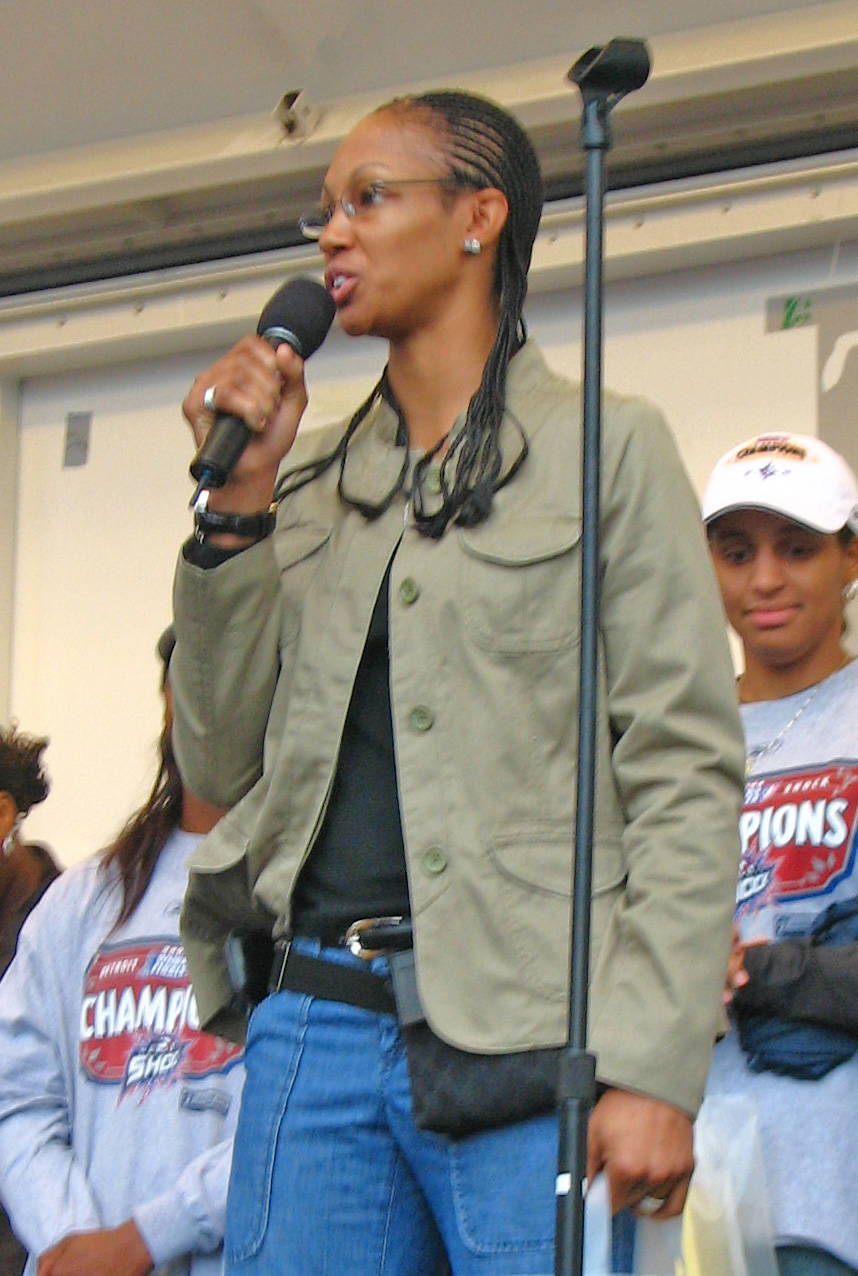
Deanna Nolan speaking at the championship rally after the Shock won the 2006 WNBA Finals. She was named Finals MVP that season.

The Shock performed well during the regular season, posting a 23–11 record to secure the #2 seed in the playoffs. The Shock went on to make quick work of the Indiana Fever, sweeping them in the first round. In the Conference Finals, the Shock matched up against the Connecticut Sun. This time, the Shock emerged victorious from the hard-fought series, winning it 2–1. In the WNBA Finals, which were now best-of-five, the Shock faced the defending champion Sacramento Monarchs. The Shock lost Game 1, getting handily defeated 95–71 at home. The Shock rallied in Game 2 to even up the series 1–1. Going to Sacramento, the Shock were defeated in Game 3 89–69. With their backs against the wall, the Shock dominated the Monarchs in Game 4, 72–52, setting up the crucial Game 5 in Detroit. Due to a scheduling conflict, Game 5 was played at Joe Louis Arena. At halftime in Game 5, the Shock found themselves down 44–36. However, in the third quarter, the Shock outscored the Monarchs 22–9, taking a 58–53 lead going into the fourth quarter. The Shock held off the Monarchs, 80–75, to win the championship in five games. Deanna Nolan was named WNBA Finals MVP.

In 2007, the Shock sought to defend their title. The Shock finished with a WNBA-best 24–10 regular season record, and captured the #1 seed in the playoffs for the second time in franchise history. In the first round, the Shock were heavily favored against a New York Liberty team that was not predicted to make the postseason. However, in Game 1, the Shock came out flat and were defeated 73–51. In Game 2, the Shock won 76–73 to force a Game 3. Game 3 was a battle, as the game went into overtime. In the end, the Shock emerged the victors by the score of 71–70. In the Eastern Conference Finals, the Shock faced the Indiana Fever, with whom the Shock were bitter rivals. In Game 1, the Shock lost by the score of 75–65. The Shock rallied to win Games 2 and 3 by the scores of 77–63 and 81–65, respectively. In the WNBA Finals, the Shock faced the Phoenix Mercury, who had dominated the Western Conference all year long. The Shock won Game 1 108–100 at home. The Mercury evened the series up in Game 2, defeating the Shock 98–70. The series shifted to Phoenix for Games 3 and 4. The Shock won a rough Game 3 88–83. With a chance to win the championship in Game 4, the Shock and Mercury battled back and forth all game. When the dust cleared, the Mercury won 77–76, forcing a decisive Game 5 in Detroit. In Game 5, the Shock were dominated as they lost 108–92. With the loss, the Shock became the first team to lose the championship at home in WNBA history.

The following season, the Shock went 22–12, which was the best record in the East. In the first round against the Indiana Fever, the Shock defeated the Fever in three games. Due to the scheduling of other events at the Palace, the Shock had to play their remaining home games at Eastern Michigan University's Convocation Center in Ypsilanti. In the Conference Finals against the New York Liberty, the Shock defeated the Liberty in three games to move on to the WNBA Finals against the league best San Antonio Silver Stars. Although the Silver Stars had the best record in the league in 2008, the Shock swept them to capture their third championship in franchise history. Katie Smith was named WNBA Finals MVP.

=== 2009: The final season in Detroit ===
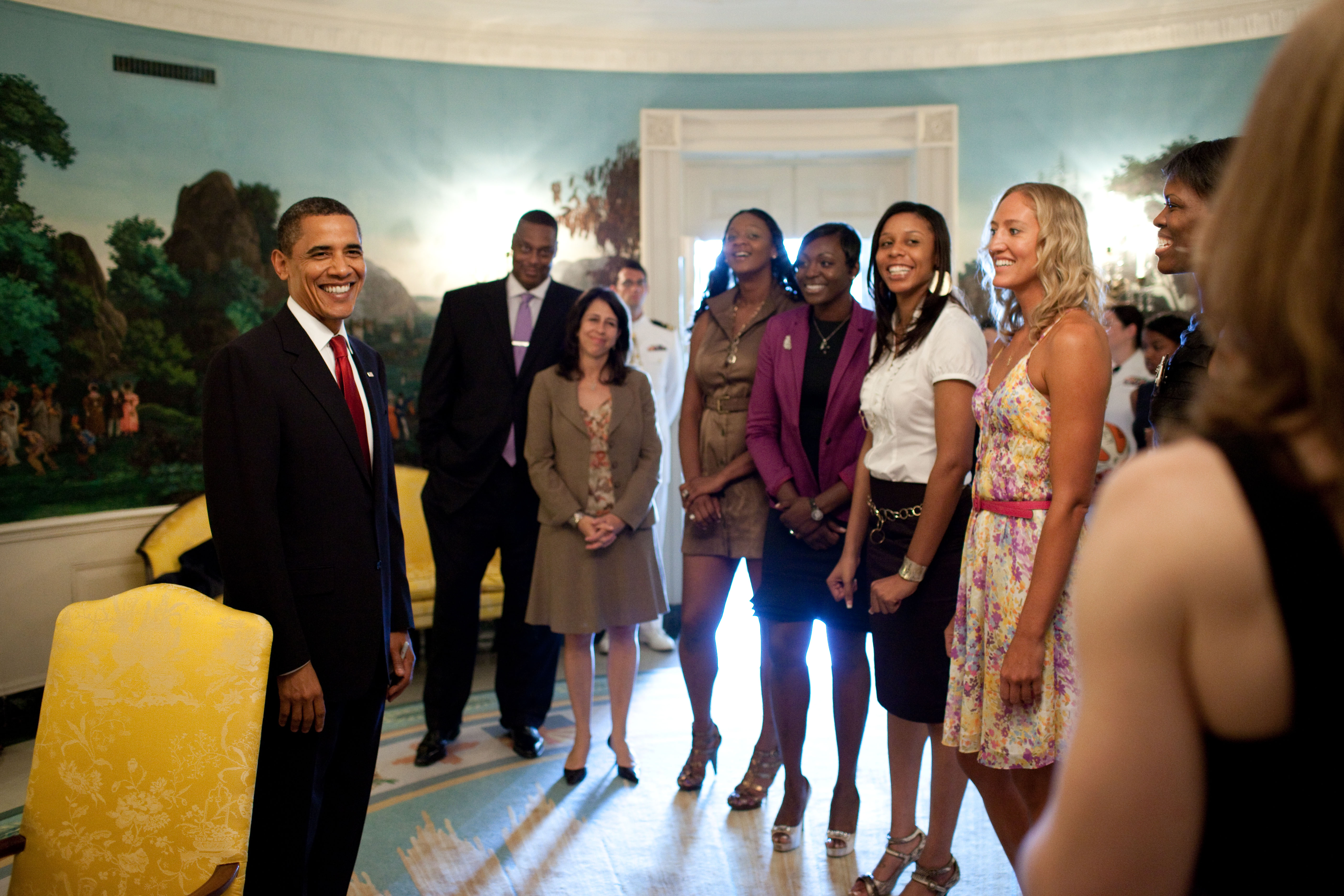
President Obama with the Shock in the White House in July 2009 after they won the 2008 WNBA Finals.

Three games into the 2009 season, Bill Laimbeer announced his resignation as head coach. He was succeeded by Rick Mahorn. The Shock struggled in the first half of the season. However, they bounced back in the second half to ultimately finish with a 18–16 record, which was good enough to clinch a playoff berth for the seventh straight year. In the first round, the Shock swept the Atlanta Dream to advance to their fourth straight Eastern Conference Finals against the Indiana Fever. In the Eastern Conference Finals, the Shock were defeated by the Fever in three games, missing the WNBA Finals for the first time since 2005.

=== Relocation to Tulsa ===
On October 19, 2009, the Associated Press reported that a Shock official stated that the team was relocating to Tulsa, Oklahoma. The following day, the decision was officially announced at a press conference in Tulsa. Economic issues was cited as the reason for the relocation.

=== Revival ===
On June 30, 2025, Detroit was officially announced as one of three cities to receive new WNBA teams, along with Cleveland and Philadelphia. Detroit is scheduled to begin play in 2029 at Little Caesars Arena. The team plans to regain the Shock's history back from the Dallas Wings, who will retroactively be considered to be a 2010 expansion team afterwards.

== Team identity ==
=== Logo and uniforms ===
From 2002 to 2009, the Shock's home uniforms were white with the stylized Shock name in red on the front, while road jerseys were blue with the word "Detroit" across the front in red and white. From 1998 to 2001, a more complex color scheme of teal, yellow and red was used.

== Season-by-season record ==
Season	Team	Conference		Regular season			Playoffs results	Head coach
Season	Team	Conference		W	L	Win%	Playoffs results	Head coach
1998	1998	East	4th	17	13	.567		Nancy Lieberman
1999	1999	East	2nd	15	17	.469	Lost conference semifinals (Charlotte, 0–1)	Nancy Lieberman
2000	2000	East	5th	14	18	.438		Nancy Lieberman
2001	2001	East	7th	10	22	.313		Greg Williams
2002	2002	East	8th	9	23	.281		G. Williams (0–10); B. Laimbeer (9–13)
2003	2003	East	1st	25	9	.735	Won conference semifinals (Cleveland, 2–1); Won conference finals (Connecticut, 2–0); Won WNBA Finals (Los Angeles, 2–1)	Bill Laimbeer
2004	2004	East	3rd	17	17	.500	Lost conference semifinals (New York, 1–2)	Bill Laimbeer
2005	2005	East	4th	16	18	.471	Lost conference semifinals (Connecticut, 0–2)	Bill Laimbeer
2006	2006	East	2nd	23	11	.676	Won conference semifinals (Indiana, 2–0); Won conference finals (Connecticut, 2–1); Won WNBA Finals (Sacramento, 3–2)	Bill Laimbeer
2007	2007	East	1st	24	10	.706	Won conference semifinals (New York, 2–1); Won conference finals (Indiana, 2–1); Lost WNBA Finals (Phoenix, 2–3)	Bill Laimbeer
2008	2008	East	1st	22	12	.647	Won conference semifinals (Indiana, 2–1); Won conference finals (New York, 2–1); Won WNBA Finals (San Antonio, 3–0)	Bill Laimbeer
2009	2009	East	3rd	18	16	.529	Won conference semifinals (Atlanta, 2–0); Lost conference finals (Indiana, 1–2)	B. Laimbeer (1–2); R. Mahorn (17–14)
Regular season				210	186	.530	4 conference championships	
Playoffs				30	19	.612	3 WNBA championships	

== Players ==
=== Basketball Hall of Fame members ===
Detroit Shock Hall of Famers
Players
No.	Name	Position	Tenure	Inducted
32	Swin Cash	F	2002–2007	2022
10	Nancy Lieberman ^{1}	G	2008	1996
30	Katie Smith	G/F	2006–2009	2018
8	Lynette Woodard	G	1998	2004

Notes:

- ^{1} Lieberman signed a seven-day contract in 2008.

=== FIBA Hall of Famers ===
Detroit Shock Hall of Famers
Players
No.	Name	Position	Tenure	Inducted
12	Razija Mujanović	C	1999	2017

== Coaches and others ==
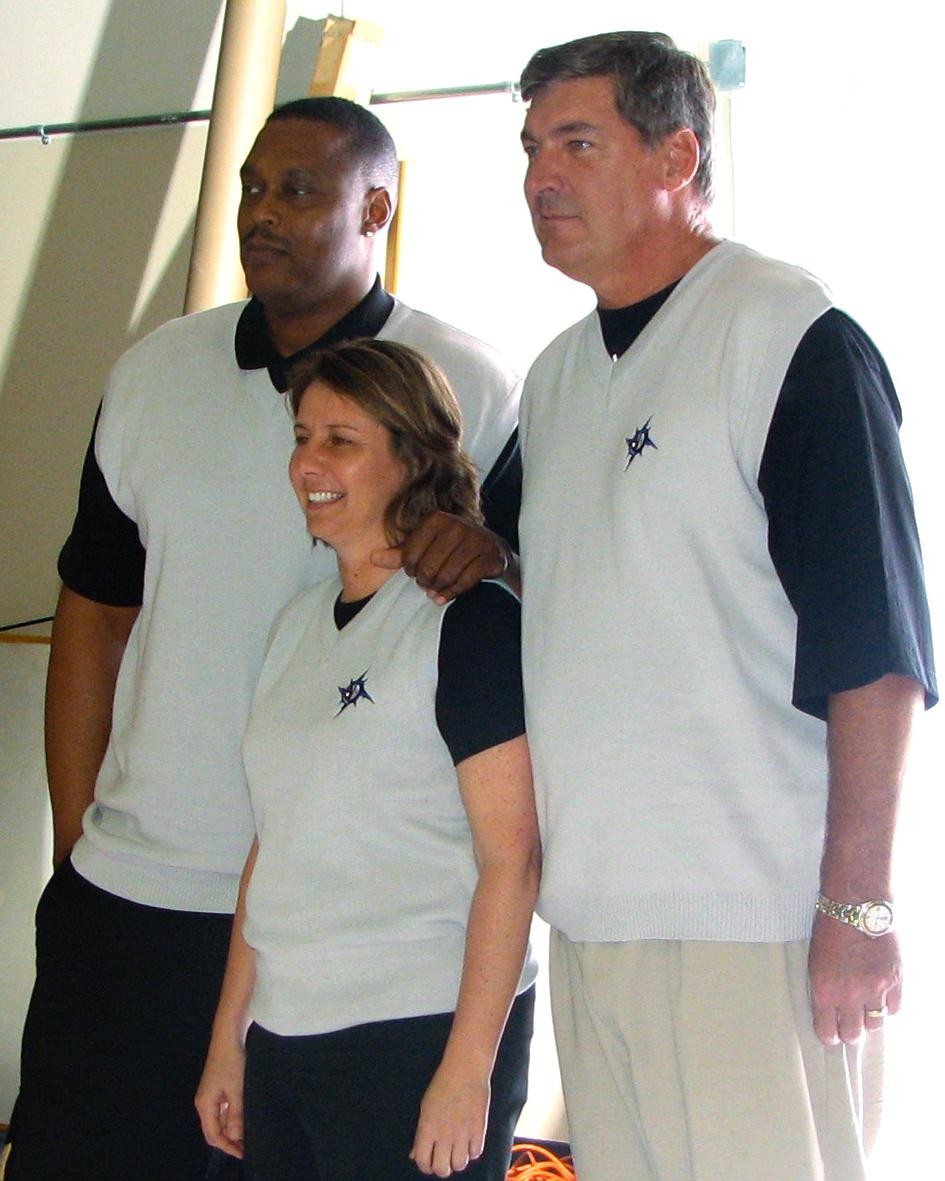
Detroit Shock coaching staff in 2007

Head coaches:

- Nancy Lieberman (1998–2000)
- Greg Williams (2001–2002)
- Bill Laimbeer (2002–2009)
- Rick Mahorn (2009)

General managers:

- Nancy Lieberman (1998–2000)
- Greg Williams (2001–2002)
- Bill Laimbeer (2002–2009)
- Cheryl Reeve (2009)

Assistant coaches

- Laurie Byrd (2003–2005)
- Earl Cureton (2009)
- Korie Hlede (2003–2004)
- Rick Mahorn (2005–2009)
- Cheryl Reeve (2006–2009)

== Individual records and awards ==
=== Individual awards ===
WNBA Finals MVP

- Ruth Riley – 2003
- Deanna Nolan – 2006
- Katie Smith – 2008

WNBA Rookie of the Year

- Cheryl Ford – 2003

WNBA Sixth Woman of the Year

- Plenette Pierson – 2007

WNBA Coach of the Year

- Bill Laimbeer – 2003

All-WNBA First Team

- Deanna Nolan – 2005, 2007

All-WNBA Second Team

- Cindy Brown – 1998
- Swin Cash – 2003, 2004
- Cheryl Ford – 2003, 2006
- Deanna Nolan – 2003, 2008, 2009

WNBA All-Defensive First Team

- Deanna Nolan – 2007

WNBA All-Defensive Second Team

- Cheryl Ford – 2006
- Deanna Nolan – 2005, 2006, 2008, 2009
- Katie Smith – 2008

WNBA All-Rookie Team

- Kara Braxton – 2005
- Shavonte Zellous – 2009

WNBA Peak Performers

- Sandy Brondello – 1998
- Cheryl Ford – 2005, 2006

=== WNBA All-Star Game ===
All-Stars

- 1999: Sandy Brondello
- 2000: Wendy Palmer
- 2001: None
- 2002: None
- 2003: Swin Cash, Cheryl Ford, Deanna Nolan
- 2004: Cheryl Ford, Deanna Nolan
- 2005: Swin Cash, Cheryl Ford, Deanna Nolan, Ruth Riley
- 2006: Cheryl Ford, Deanna Nolan, Katie Smith
- 2007: Cheryl Ford, Deanna Nolan, Kara Braxton
- 2008: No All-Star Game
- 2009: Katie Smith

Head coach

- Bill Laimbeer – 2004, 2007

WNBA All-Star Game MVP

- Cheryl Ford – 2007
