= Katie Smith =

American basketball player and coach (born 1974)

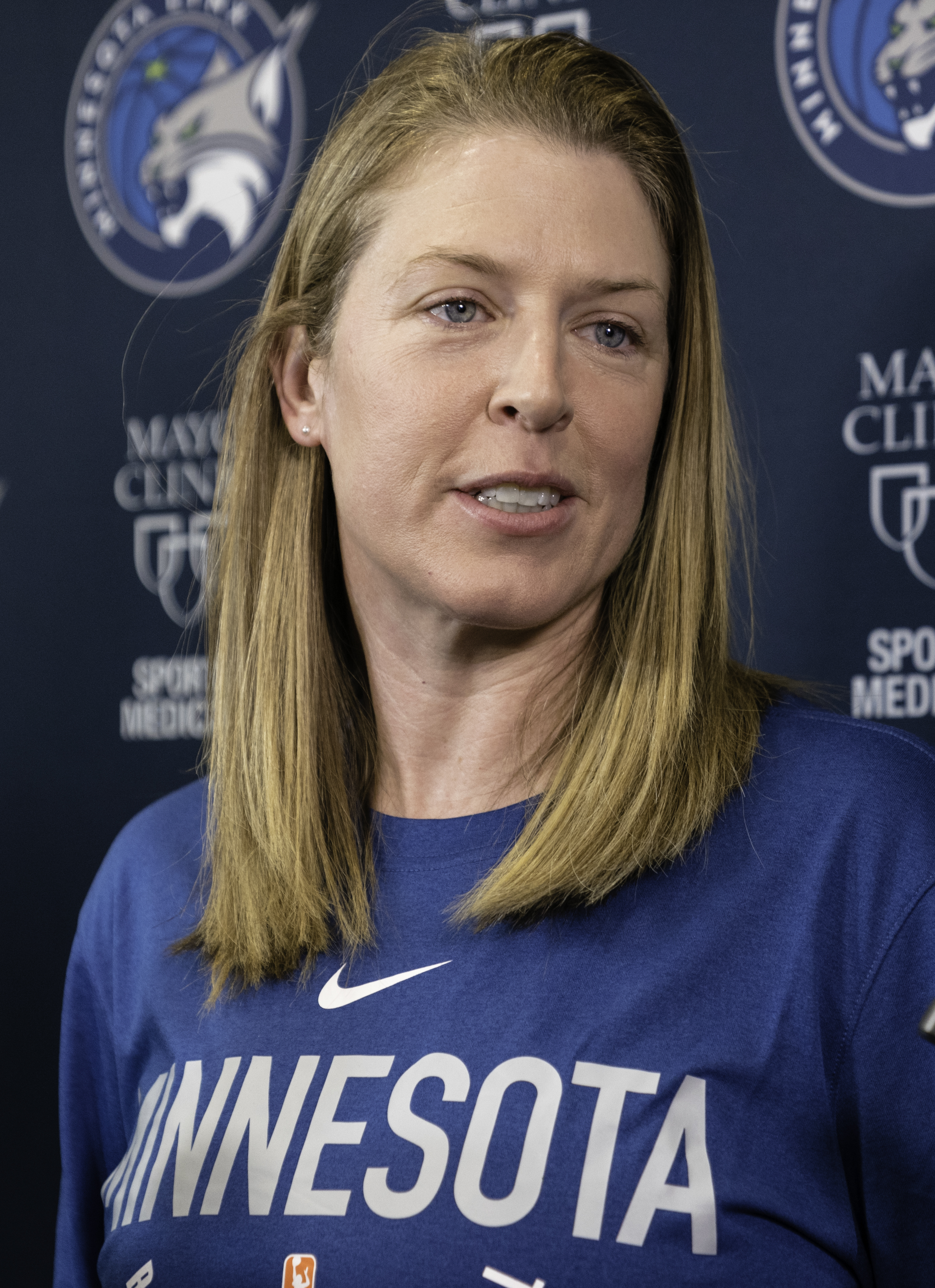
- Smith speaking at a press conference in 2019

Ohio State Buckeyes
- Title: Assistant coach
- League: Big Ten Conference

Personal information
- Born: June 4, 1974 (age 52) Logan, Ohio, U.S.
- Listed height: 5 ft 11 in (1.80 m)
- Listed weight: 175 lb (79 kg)

Career information
- High school: Logan (Logan, Ohio)
- College: Ohio State (1992–1996)
- WNBA draft: 1999: Allocated
- Drafted by: Minnesota Lynx
- Playing career: 1996–2013
- Position: Shooting guard / small forward
- Number: 30
- Coaching career: 2014–present

Career history

Playing
- 1996–1998: Columbus Quest
- 1999–2005: Minnesota Lynx
- 2001–2002: Lotos Gdynia
- 2006–2009: Detroit Shock
- 2009: Fenerbahçe Istanbul
- 2010: Washington Mystics
- 2011–2013: Seattle Storm
- 2013: New York Liberty

Coaching
- 2014–2017: New York Liberty (assistant)
- 2018–2019: New York Liberty
- 2020–2024: Minnesota Lynx (associate HC)
- 2024–present: Ohio State (assistant)

Career highlights
- As player: 2× ABL champion (1997, 1998); 2× WNBA champion (2006, 2008); WNBA Finals MVP (2008); 2× All-WNBA First Team (2001, 2003); 7× WNBA All-Star (2000–2003, 2005, 2006, 2009); WNBA scoring champion (2001); WNBA anniversary teams (10th, 15th, 20th, 25th); Second-team All-American – AP (1996); 2× All-American – USBWA (1994, 1996); 2× Kodak All-American (1993, 1996); Big Ten Player of the Year (1996); Chicago Tribune Silver Basketball (1996); 3× First-team All-Big Ten (1994–1996); USBWA Freshman of the Year (1993); Big Ten Freshman of the Year (1993); Gatorade National Player of the Year (1992); USA Basketball Female Athlete of the Year (2008); As assistant coach: WNBA Commissioner's Cup Champion (2024)
- Stats at WNBA.com
- Stats at Basketball Reference
- Basketball Hall of Fame
- Women's Basketball Hall of Fame
Medals
Women's basketball
Representing the United States
Olympic Games
Gold medal – first place	2000 Sydney	Team competition
Gold medal – first place	2004 Athens	Team competition
Gold medal – first place	2008 Beijing	Team competition
World Cup
Gold medal – first place	1998 Germany	Team competition
Gold medal – first place	2002 China	Team competition
Bronze medal – third place	2006 Brazil	Team competition
Universiade
Silver medal – second place	1995 Fukuoka	Team competition
Jones Cup
Gold medal – first place	1996	Team competition

Katie Smith (born June 4, 1974) is an American basketball coach and former player who is an assistant coach for the Ohio State Buckeyes women's basketball team. She is the former head coach of the New York Liberty.

A retired professional basketball player, Smith's primary position was shooting guard, although she sometimes played small forward or point guard. She was the all-time leading scorer in women's professional basketball, having achieved over 7000 points in both her ABL and WNBA career. In 2016, she was voted one of the WNBA Top 20@20. On March 31, 2018, Smith was named to the 2018 class of inductees for the Naismith Memorial Basketball Hall of Fame. In the same year, Smith was also inducted into the Women's Basketball Hall of Fame.

== Early life ==
Smith was born in Logan, Ohio, where she spent her formative years. She began playing basketball as early as the fifth grade on a boys' team and took tap dance and ballet lessons as a youngster.

She grew up in a family of student-athletes. Her father, John Jr., played football at Ohio University (OU), and won three varsity letters in the 1960s before becoming a dentist. Her younger brother, Tom, earned three varsity letters playing football at Ohio University as well as being a member on their track and field team. Tom won the 1996 Mid-American Conference championship in the discus throw. Her older brother, John, was a member of one of 13 University of Mount Union football teams that won the NCAA Division III title. He now is the head football coach at Bexley High School.

== High school ==
At Logan High School she was named the national Gatorade National Player of the Year during her senior year as she guided the Lady Chieftains to the Division I Ohio Girls' Basketball state championship game. Smith was named a High School All-American by the WBCA. She participated in the inaugural WBCA High School All-America Game in 1992, scoring fourteen points, and earning MVP honors.

== College career ==
Smith attended Ohio State University in Columbus, Ohio from 1992 to 1996, and helped lead the Buckeyes to a Big Ten championship and the NCAA title game her freshman year. During her career at OSU, Smith broke the Big Ten scoring record for points scored in a career, in men's or women's basketball. She earned two Big Ten Conference player of the year awards as a senior: the conference's own award and the Chicago Tribune Silver Basketball.

Smith graduated in 1996 with a degree in zoology. On January 21, 2001, Ohio State honored her as the first female Buckeye athlete to have her number retired. She was also inducted into the Ohio State Varsity O Hall of Fame in October 2001.

=== Ohio State statistics ===
Legend
GP	Games played	GS	Games started	MPG	Minutes per game
FG%	Field goal percentage	3P%	3-point field goal percentage	FT%	Free throw percentage
RPG	Rebounds per game	APG	Assists per game	SPG	Steals per game
BPG	Blocks per game	PPG	Points per game	**Bold**	Career high

Year	Team	GP	Points	FG%	FT%	RPG	APG	SPG	BPG	PPG
1992–93	Ohio State	32	578	**50.4%**	80.8%	5.8	3.3	**1.8**	0.1	18.1
1993–94	Ohio State	28	616	49.3%	81.9%	**6.1**	3.1	1.1	**0.2**	**22.0**
1994–95	Ohio State	30	639	45.3%	84.4%	5.8	3.6	1.2	0.1	21.3
1995–96	Ohio State	**34**	**745**	43.6%	**87.2%**	5.1	**4.3**	1.4	0.0	21.9
Total		124	2578	46.9%	83.8%	5.7	3.6	1.4	0.1	20.8

== Professional career ==
=== ABL ===
Smith played for the Columbus Quest of the ABL, helping the team to win both League championships in its only two full seasons of existence.

=== WNBA ===
On May 3, 1999, Smith was selected as part of the league's post-expansion draft player allocation by the Minnesota Lynx. From 1999 to 2005 Smith played for the Minnesota Lynx, where her outside shooting was the central focus of the Lynx offense.

On July 30, 2005, Smith was traded to the Detroit Shock along with the Lynx's 2006 second round pick, for Chandi Jones, Stacey Thomas and the Shock's 2006 first round draft pick. In 2005, she became the first American female basketball player to score 5,000 total points in a professional career.

In 2006, Smith became the first WNBA player to win All Star games as a member of both the Eastern and Western Conference teams. She also became the only player to earn both ABL and WNBA championship rings when the Shock won the WNBA title, defeating the Sacramento Monarchs, the same year.

On August 16, 2007 she became the first professional women's basketball player to score 6,000 career points (ABL and WNBA combined). At the end of her career in 2013, Smith had a total of 7,885 professional career points, including 1,433 from the ABL and 6,452 from the WNBA.

Smith was the MVP of the 2008 WNBA Finals, when the Shock beat the San Antonio Silver Stars 3–0.

On March 16, 2010, Smith signed a contract with the Washington Mystics as a free agent.

On April 29, 2011, Smith was acquired by the Seattle Storm in a three-team trade with the Mystics and Indiana Fever. At the 2011 WNBA All-Star Game, she was announced as one of the Top 15 players in the fifteen-year history of the WNBA as voted by fans. On September 11, 2011 Katie Smith became the third player to score 6,000 points in her WNBA career.

In 2013, Smith was picked up by the New York Liberty and announced that the 2013 season would be her last.

=== Europe ===
During the 2001–02 season she played for Polish Lotos Gdynia. They reached the final of EuroLeague Women. In 2009, she played for Turkish Fenerbahçe Istanbul.

== National team career ==
Smith was chosen to join the team which was invited to the 1993 U19 World Championship (then called the Junior World Championship). The team won five games and lost two, but that left them in seventh place. Smith was the second leading scorer for the team with 9.9 points per game

Smith represented the US at the 1995 World University Games held in Fukuoka, Japan in August and September 1995. The team had a record of 5–1, securing the silver medal. The USA team won early and reached a record of 5–0 when the USA beat Yugoslavia. In the semi-final game, the USA faced Russia. The team was behind much of the first half but managed to tie the game at the half. The USA broke the game open in the second half and won 101–74. The gold medal match was against unbeaten Italy. The Italian team started strong, scoring 12 of the first 14 points of the contest. Sylvia Crawley scored eight consecutive points to end the first half, but that left the USA nine points behind. The USA took a small lead in the second half, but the team from Italy responded with a ten-point run, and won the game and the gold medal by a score of 73–65. Smith averaged 4.4 points per game during the event.

Smith was invited to be a member of the Jones Cup team representing the US in 1996. She helped the team to a 9–0 record, and the gold medal in the event. Smith averaged 6.8 points per game.

As a member of the USAB women's senior national team, Smith helped the US earn the gold medals in the 2000, 2004 and 2008 Olympics as well as the 1998 and 2002 World Championships.

Smith was named to the USA national team in 1998. The national team traveled to Berlin, Germany in July and August 1998 for the FIBA World Championships. The USA team won a close opening game against Japan 95–89, then won their next six games easily. In the semifinal game against Brazil, the USA team was behind as much as ten points in the first half, but the USA went on to win 93–79. The gold medal game was a rematch against Russia. In the first game, the USA team dominated almost from the beginning, but in the rematch, the team from Russia took the early lead and led much of the way. With under two minutes remaining, the USA was down by two points but the USA responded, then held on to win the gold medal 71–65. Smith averaged 9.3 points per game.

== WNBA career statistics ==
Legend
GP	Games played	GS	Games started	MPG	Minutes per game	RPG	Rebounds per game
APG	Assists per game	SPG	Steals per game	BPG	Blocks per game	PPG	Points per game
TO	Turnovers per game	FG%	Field-goal percentage	3P%	3-point field-goal percentage	FT%	Free-throw percentage
**Bold**	Career best	°	League leader

†	Denotes seasons in which Smith won a WNBA championship

=== Regular season ===
Year	Team	GP	GS	MPG	FG%	3P%	FT%	RPG	APG	SPG	BPG	TO	PPG
1999	Minnesota	30	29	32.4	.387	.382	.766	2.9	2.0	0.6	**0.3**	1.83	11.7
2000	Minnesota	32	32	37.3°	.421	.379	.869	2.9	2.8	**1.4**	0.2	2.38	20.2
2001	Minnesota	32	32	**38.6**°	.393	.354	.895	3.8	2.2	0.7	0.2	2.72	**23.1**°
2002	Minnesota	31	31	36.7°	.404	.330	.824	3.0	2.5	1.0	0.2	2.26	16.5
2003	Minnesota	34	**34**	34.9	**.457**	.390	.881	**4.1**	2.5	0.7	0.2	1.97	18.2
2004	Minnesota	23	23	34.8	.431	**.432**	.899	3.7	2.3	1.0	**0.3**	2.22	18.8
2005*	Minnesota	23	23	33.3	.383	.337	.789	2.4	2.7	1.1	0.1	2.35	13.3
2005*	Detroit	13	9	30.3	.374	.327	.765	2.2	2.0	0.4	0.2	1.31	9.5
2005	Total	**36**°	32	32.3	.380	.333	.782	2.3	2.4	0.8	0.1	2.00	11.9
2006^{†}	Detroit	34	**34**	33.4	.407	.366	.912	2.7	3.3	0.7	0.1	1.91	11.7
2007	Detroit	34	**34**	34.3	.361	.311	.847	3.8	3.6	1.2	0.1	1.74	13.2
2008^{†}	Detroit	34	**34**	33.9	.383	.360	.887	2.8	**4.0**	0.9	0.1	2.35	14.7
2009	Detroit	27	27	33.1	.435	**.432**	**.918**	2.3	2.8	0.8	0.1	2.30	13.7
2010	Washington	33	33	30.8	.395	.362	.764	2.1	2.6	0.7	0.2	1.61	9.5
2011	Seattle	34	3	25.1	.395	.395	.857	2.3	2.0	0.7	0.2	**1.32**	7.5
2012	Seattle	34	31	27	.412	.4	.838	2.7	2.1	0.6	0.1	1.5	6.7
2013	New York	34	30	26.6	.374	.315	.848	1.9	1.8	0.7	0.2	1.26	6.1
Career	14 years, 4 teams	448	409	33.1	.405	.369	.859	2.9	2.7	0.9	0.2	1.99	13.9

=== Postseason ===
Year	Team	GP	GS	MPG	FG%	3P%	FT%	RPG	APG	SPG	BPG	TO	PPG
2003	Minnesota	3	3	**40.0**°	.429	.357	.917	**4.3**	3.0	0.3	0.0	2.67	**17.3**
2005	Detroit	2	2	33.5	.269	.200	**1**	3.0	0.5	**1.0**	0.0	1	10.5
2006^{†}	Detroit	10	10	36.8	.436	**.4**	.735	2.5	**4.0**	0.5	0.0	2.40	14.7
2007	Detroit	**11**	**11**	35.7	.341	.342	.760	3.2	3.6	0.7	**0.2**	2.27	12.2
2008^{†}	Detroit	9	9	34.3	.410	.354	.758	4.0	2.4	0.4	0.1	1.78	15.3
2010	Washington	2	2	27.5	.333	.143	.833	4.0	1.0	0.5	0.0	1.50	7.0
2011	Seattle	3	0	25.3	.174	.286	**1**	3	2.3	0.7	0	**0.67**	5.3
2012	Seattle	3	3	37.3	**.455**	**.4**	.667	2.3	2	**1.0**	0	1.67	9.3
Career	8 years, 4 teams	43	40	34.9	.381	.345	.784	3.2	3	0.6	0.1	1.98	12.8

== Coaching career ==
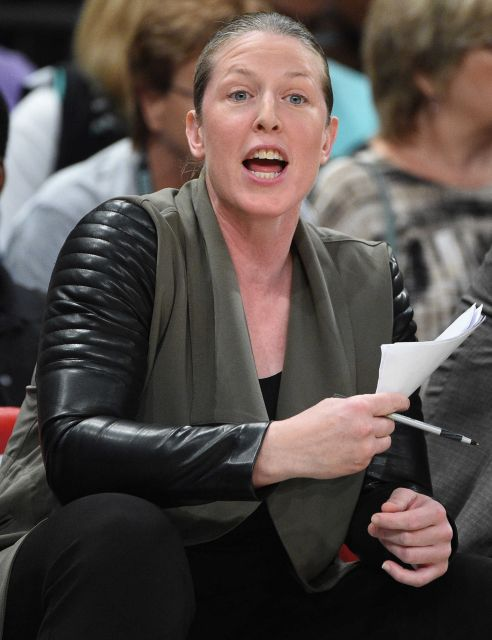
Smith coaching the New York Liberty in 2016

Following the end of the Liberty's 2013 season, she was named one of the team's assistant coaches, replacing the departing Taj McWilliams-Franklin. Smith was named associate head coach of the New York Liberty for the 2016 season. She was elevated to head coach in October 2017. She was the head coach in the 2018 and 2019 seasons, but her contract was not renewed for 2020. Smith then became the lead assistant coach for the Minnesota Lynx.

== Coaching record ==
Legend
Regular season	G	Games coached	W	Games won	L	Games lost	W–L %	Win–loss %
Playoffs	PG	Playoff games	PW	Playoff wins	PL	Playoff losses	PW–L %	Playoff win–loss %

Team	Year	G	W	L	W–L%	Finish	PG	PW	PL	PW–L%	Result
NYL	2018	34	7	27	.206	5th in Eastern	—	—	—	—	Missed Playoffs
NYL	2019	34	10	24	.294	5th in Eastern	—	—	—	—	Missed Playoffs
Career		68	17	51	.250		0	0	0	–	

== See also ==
- Basketball in the United States
- List of WNBA players
