= Cheryl Ford =

American basketball player (born 1981)

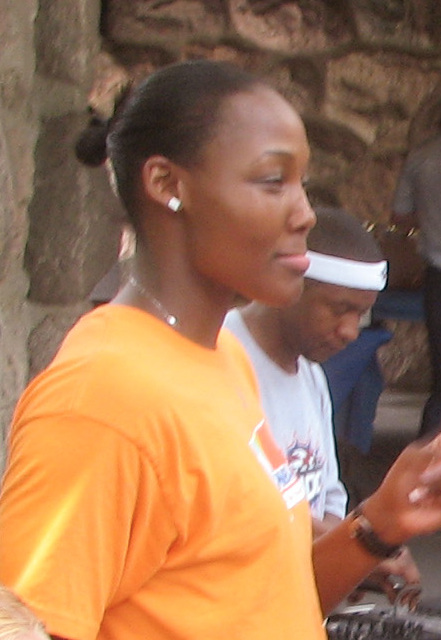

Personal information
- Born: June 6, 1981 (age 45) Homer, Louisiana, U.S.
- Listed height: 6 ft 3 in (1.91 m)
- Listed weight: 195 lb (88 kg)

Career information
- High school: Summerfield (Summerfield, Louisiana)
- College: Louisiana Tech (1999–2003)
- WNBA draft: 2003: 1st round, 3rd overall pick
- Drafted by: Detroit Shock
- Playing career: 2003–2013
- Position: Forward

Career history
- 2003–2009: Detroit Shock
- 2004–2005: Dallas Fury
- 2005–2006: Anda Ramat HaSharon
- 2006–2007: UMMC Ekaterinburg
- 2010: CCC Aquapark Polkowice
- 2010–2011: Frisco SIKA Brno
- 2011–2012: Beretta Famila Schio
- 2012–2013: Samsun Canik Belediyespor

Career highlights
- 3× WNBA champion (2003, 2006, 2008); 4× WNBA All-Star (2003, 2005–2007); 2× All-WNBA Second Team (2003, 2006); WNBA All-Star Game MVP (2007); WNBA Rookie of the Year Award (2003); 2× WNBA rebounding champion (2005, 2006); WAC tournament MVP (2003); 2× WAC Player of the Year (2002, 2003); 2× First-team All-WAC team (2002, 2003)
- Stats at WNBA.com
- Stats at Basketball Reference
Medals
Women's basketball
Representing USA
World Championship
| Bronze medal – third place | 2006 Brazil | Team competition |

Cheryl Ford (born June 6, 1981) is an American former professional basketball player. As a member of the Detroit Shock, she won the WNBA championship three times.

== Early life and education ==
Cheryl Ford is the daughter of Bonita Ford and former NBA player Karl Malone. She has a twin brother named Daryl and a half brother, former NFL offensive tackle Demetress Bell. Malone's paternity was established as the result of a drawn-out paternity suit.

Ford played for Summerfield High School in Summerfield, Louisiana, where she was named a WBCA All-American. She participated in the 1999 WBCA High School All-America Game, where she scored two points.

== College career ==
Ford was a standout collegiate player at Louisiana Tech University. In 2003, she was named to the Associated Press' All-America Honorable Mention team. She was also named the Western Athletic Conference "Player of the Year" in 2002 and 2003.

=== Louisiana Tech statistics ===
Legend
| GP | Games played | GS | Games started | MPG | Minutes per game |
| FG% | Field goal percentage | 3P% | 3-point field goal percentage | FT% | Free throw percentage |
| RPG | Rebounds per game | APG | Assists per game | SPG | Steals per game |
| BPG | Blocks per game | PPG | Points per game | **Bold** | Career high |

| Year | Team | GP | Points | FG% | 3P% | FT% | RPG | APG | SPG | BPG | PPG |
|---|---|---|---|---|---|---|---|---|---|---|---|
| 1999–2000 | Louisiana Tech | 34 | 222 | **58.0** | – | **66.7** | 5.2 | 0.1 | 0.6 | 0.9 | 6.5 |
| 2000–01 | Louisiana Tech | **35** | 287 | 52.7 | – | 60.0 | 5.1 | 0.5 | 0.7 | 0.7 | 8.2 |
| 2001–02 | Louisiana Tech | 30 | 338 | 46.5 | – | 58.6 | 8.7 | 0.4 | 0.9 | 1.8 | 11.3 |
| 2002–03 | Louisiana Tech | 34 | **533** | 48.0 | – | 63.0 | **12.9** | **0.9** | **1.6** | **1.9** | **15.7** |
| Career | Louisiana Tech | 133 | 1380 | 49.9 | 0.0 | 61.7 | 7.9 | 0.5 | 1.0 | 1.3 | 10.4 |

== Professional career ==
In 2003, Ford was drafted as the No. 3 overall pick in the first round by the Detroit Shock in the WNBA draft.

In just her first year in the league, Ford led the Shock from worst to the best record and a WNBA championship in 2003. She is the first player to have won the WNBA Rookie of the Year Award and a WNBA championship in the same year. Afterwards, she played for the Dallas Fury in the National Women's Basketball League (NWBL) under Coach Nancy Lieberman.

Ford spent the 2005–06 season in Israel, playing for Anda Ramat Hasharon.

On July 15, 2007, Ford won the WNBA All-Star Game MVP Award in Washington, D.C. when the East beat the West 103–99.

Ford missed the rest of the 2008 WNBA season due to an anterior cruciate ligament injury in her right knee, sustained on July 22, 2008 during a game against the Los Angeles Sparks with 2:06 remaining in the fourth quarter. Though she returned to the game in the final minute, a brawl had broken out and Ford aggravated the injury further while attempting to restrain her teammate.

During the 2009 WNBA season, Ford averaged 7.4 rebounds per game and 8.6 points per game.

In January 2010, Ford signed a deal with Polish team CCC Aquapark Polkowice from 1st division league Ford Germaz Ekstraklasa (PLKK). Ford spent the 2011–12 season with Beretta Famila Schio, averaging 11.3 points and 11.9 rebounds per game. On September 12, 2012, The Canik Belediyesi basketball club was announced as having signed Ford, as well as New York Liberty veteran Janel McCarville.

In March 2013, she signed with the New York Liberty. She missed most of the preseason due to a left knee injury, appearing in one preseason game before being released in June.

=== WNBA career statistics ===
Legend
| GP | Games played | GS | Games started | MPG | Minutes per game | RPG | Rebounds per game |
| APG | Assists per game | SPG | Steals per game | BPG | Blocks per game | PPG | Points per game |
| TO | Turnovers per game | FG% | Field-goal percentage | 3P% | 3-point field-goal percentage | FT% | Free-throw percentage |
| **Bold** | Career best | ° | League leader |

==== Regular season ====
| Year | Team | GP | GS | MPG | FG% | 3P% | FT% | RPG | APG | SPG | BPG | TO | PPG |
|---|---|---|---|---|---|---|---|---|---|---|---|---|---|
| 2003 | Detroit | 32 | 32 | 29.9 | .474 | .000 | **.682** | 10.4 | 0.8 | 1.0 | 1.0 | 2.47 | 10.8 |
| 2004 | Detroit | 31 | 31 | 29.4 | .411 | .000 | .589 | 9.6 | 1.1 | 1.3 | 0.8 | 1.74 | 10.6 |
| 2005 | Detroit | **33** | **33** | 28.2 | .430 | .000 | .487 | 9.8° | 0.8 | 1.0 | **1.4** | 2.09 | 9.5 |
| 2006 | Detroit | 32 | 32 | 28.7 | **.498** | .000 | .648 | **11.3**° | 1.4 | 1.2 | 0.8 | 1.81 | **13.8** |
| 2007 | Detroit | 15 | 15 | **30.7** | .497 | .000 | .639 | 11.2 | **1.5** | **1.9** | 0.7 | 2.80 | 13.0 |
| 2008 | Detroit | 24 | 24 | 26.5 | .481 | .000 | .560 | 8.7 | 0.9 | 1.0 | 0.4 | **0.96** | 10.1 |
| 2009 | Detroit | 29 | 29 | 26.0 | .427 | .000 | .550 | 7.4 | 0.9 | 1.0 | 0.4 | 1.69 | 8.6 |
| Career | 7 years, 1 team | 196 | 196 | 28.4 | .457 | .000 | .595 | 9.7 | 1.0 | 1.1 | 0.8 | 1.91 | 10.8 |

==== Playoffs ====
| Year | Team | GP | GS | MPG | FG% | 3P% | FT% | RPG | APG | SPG | BPG | TO | PPG |
|---|---|---|---|---|---|---|---|---|---|---|---|---|---|
| 2003 | Detroit | 8 | 8 | 29.0 | .324 | .000 | **.826** | 10.0° | 0.5 | **1.4** | 0.8 | **1.25** | 8.4 |
| 2004 | Detroit | 3 | 3 | **37.0** | .447 | .000 | .636 | **10.7**° | 0.3 | 1.3 | **2.3** | 2.67 | **16.0** |
| 2005 | Detroit | 2 | 2 | 24.5 | .444 | .000 | .600 | 7.0 | 1.0 | 0.5 | 1.0 | 1.50 | 9.5 |
| 2006 | Detroit | **10** | **10** | 28.7 | **.523** | .000 | .750 | 10.3° | **1.2** | 1.3 | 0.7 | 1.90 | 13.4 |
| 2007 | Detroit | **10** | 8 | 22.8 | .415 | .000 | .455 | 9.2 | 0.4 | 0.5 | 0.3 | 1.40 | 6.9 |
| 2009 | Detroit | 5 | 5 | 29.6 | .448 | .000 | .813 | 10.0 | **1.2** | **1.4** | 0.2 | 3.60 | 7.8 |
| Career | 6 years, 1 team | 38 | 36 | 27.8 | .433 | .000 | .684 | 9.8 | 0.8 | 1.1 | 0.7 | 1.89 | 9.9 |

== National team career ==
Ford was named to the National team representing the USA at the 2006 World Championships, held in Barueri and Sao Paulo, Brazil. The team won eight of their nine contests, but the lone loss came in the semifinal medal round to Russia. The USA beat Brazil in the final game to earn the bronze medal. Ford averaged 3.4 points per game.
