= 2008 WNBA playoffs =

Professional women's basketball tournament

- Dates: September 18 – October 5, 2008

Final positions
- Champions: Detroit Shock (Finals Champion)
- Runners-up: San Antonio Silver Stars

Tournament statistics
- Attendance: 8,420 per game
- Scoring leader (s): Becky Hammon (San Antonio) (18.1 PPG)

Awards
- MVP: Katie Smith (Detroit)

The 2008 WNBA playoffs was the postseason for the Women's National Basketball Association's 2008 season which ended with the Eastern Conference champion Detroit Shock defeating the Western Conference champion San Antonio Silver Stars 3-0.

== Format ==
- The top 4 teams from each conference qualify for the playoffs.
  - All 4 teams are seeded by basis of their standings.
- The series for rounds one and two are in a best-of-three format with Games 2 and 3 on the home court of the team with the higher seed.
- The series for the WNBA Finals is in a best-of-five format with Games 1, 2 and 5 on the home court of the team with the higher seed.
- Reseeding (as used in the Stanley Cup Playoffs) is not in use: therefore, all playoff matchups are predetermined via the teams' seedings.

== Playoff qualifying ==
=== Eastern Conference ===
The following teams clinched a playoff berth in the East:

1. Detroit Shock (22–12)
2. Connecticut Sun (21–13)
3. New York Liberty (19–15)
4. Indiana Fever (17–17)

=== Western Conference ===
The following teams clinched a playoff berth in the West:

1. San Antonio Silver Stars (24–10)
2. Seattle Storm (22–12)
3. Los Angeles Sparks (20–14)
4. Sacramento Monarchs (18–16)

== Bracket ==
This was the outlook for the 2008 WNBA playoffs. Teams in italics had home court advantage. Teams in bold advanced to the next round. Numbers to the left of each team indicate the team's original playoffs seeding in their respective conferences. Numbers to the right of each team indicate the number of games the team won in that round.

**Conference semifinals**
E1	**Detroit**	2
E4	Indiana	1
**Eastern Conference**
E2	Connecticut	1
E3	**New York**	2
W1	**San Antonio**	2
W4	Sacramento	1
**Western Conference**
W2	Seattle	1
W3	**Los Angeles**	2

**Conference finals**
E1	**Detroit**	2
E3	New York	1
W1	**San Antonio**	2
W3	Los Angeles	1

**WNBA Finals**
E1	**Detroit**	3
W1	San Antonio	0

- **Bold** – Series winner
- Italic – Team with home-court advantage

== Eastern Conference ==
=== First round ===
==== (1) Detroit Shock vs. (4) Indiana Fever ====
NBA TV

September 19

Game 1

**Detroit Shock** **81**, Indiana Fever 72

Conseco Fieldhouse, Indianapolis

ESPN2

September 21

Game 2

**Indiana Fever** **89**, Detroit Shock 82

Palace of Auburn Hills, Auburn Hills

ESPN2

September 23

Game 3

Indiana Fever 61, **Detroit Shock** **80**
**Detroit wins series, 2–1**

Palace of Auburn Hills, Auburn Hills

==== (2) Connecticut Sun vs. (3) New York Liberty ====
NBA TV

September 18

Game 1

Connecticut Sun 63, **New York Liberty** **72**

Madison Square Garden, New York

NBA TV

September 20

Game 2

New York Liberty 70, **Connecticut Sun** **73**

Mohegan Sun Arena, Uncasville

ESPN2

September 22

Game 3

**New York Liberty** **66**, Connecticut Sun 62
**New York wins series, 2–1**

Mohegan Sun Arena, Uncasville

=== Conference finals ===
==== (1) Detroit Shock vs. (3) New York Liberty ====
NBA TV

September 26

Game 1

Detroit Shock 56, **New York Liberty** **60**

Madison Square Garden, New York

ESPN2

September 28

Game 2

New York Liberty 55, **Detroit Shock** **64**

EMU Convocation Center, Ypsilanti

ESPN2

September 29

Game 3

New York Liberty 73, **Detroit Shock** **75**
**Detroit wins series, 2–1**

EMU Convocation Center, Ypsilanti

== Western Conference ==
=== First round ===
==== (1) San Antonio Silver Stars vs. (4) Sacramento Monarchs ====
NBA TV

September 18

Game 1

**San Antonio Silver Stars** **85**, Sacramento Monarchs 78

ARCO Arena, Sacramento

NBA TV

September 20

Game 2

**Sacramento Monarchs** **84**, San Antonio Silver Stars 67

AT&T Center, San Antonio

ESPN2

September 22

Game 3

Sacramento Monarchs 81, **San Antonio Silver Stars** **86**
**San Antonio wins series, 2–1**

AT&T Center, San Antonio

==== (2) Seattle Storm vs. (3) Los Angeles Sparks ====
NBA TV

September 19

Game 1

Seattle Storm 69, **Los Angeles Sparks** **77**

Staples Center, Los Angeles

ESPN2

September 21

Game 2

Los Angeles Sparks 50, **Seattle Storm** **64**

KeyArena, Seattle

ESPN2

September 23

Game 3

**Los Angeles Sparks** **71**, Seattle Storm 64
**Los Angeles wins series, 2–1**

KeyArena, Seattle

=== Conference finals ===
==== (1) San Antonio Silver Stars vs. (3) Los Angeles Sparks ====
NBA TV

September 25

Game 1

San Antonio Silver Stars 70, **Los Angeles Sparks** **85**

Galen Center, Los Angeles

NBA TV

September 27

Game 2

Los Angeles Sparks 66, **San Antonio Silver Stars** **67**

AT&T Center, San Antonio

ESPN2

September 28

Game 3

Los Angeles Sparks 72, **San Antonio Silver Stars** **76**
**San Antonio wins series, 2–1**

AT&T Center, San Antonio

== WNBA Finals ==
=== San Antonio Silver Stars vs. Detroit Shock ===
ESPN2

October 1

Game 1

**Detroit Shock** **77**, San Antonio Silver Stars 69

AT&T Center, San Antonio

ESPN2

October 3

Game 2

**Detroit Shock** **69**, San Antonio Silver Stars 61

AT&T Center, San Antonio

ESPN2

October 5

Game 3

San Antonio Silver Stars 60, **Detroit Shock** **76**
**Detroit wins series, 3-0**

EMU Convocation Center, Ypsilanti
