= List of WNBA annual assists leaders =

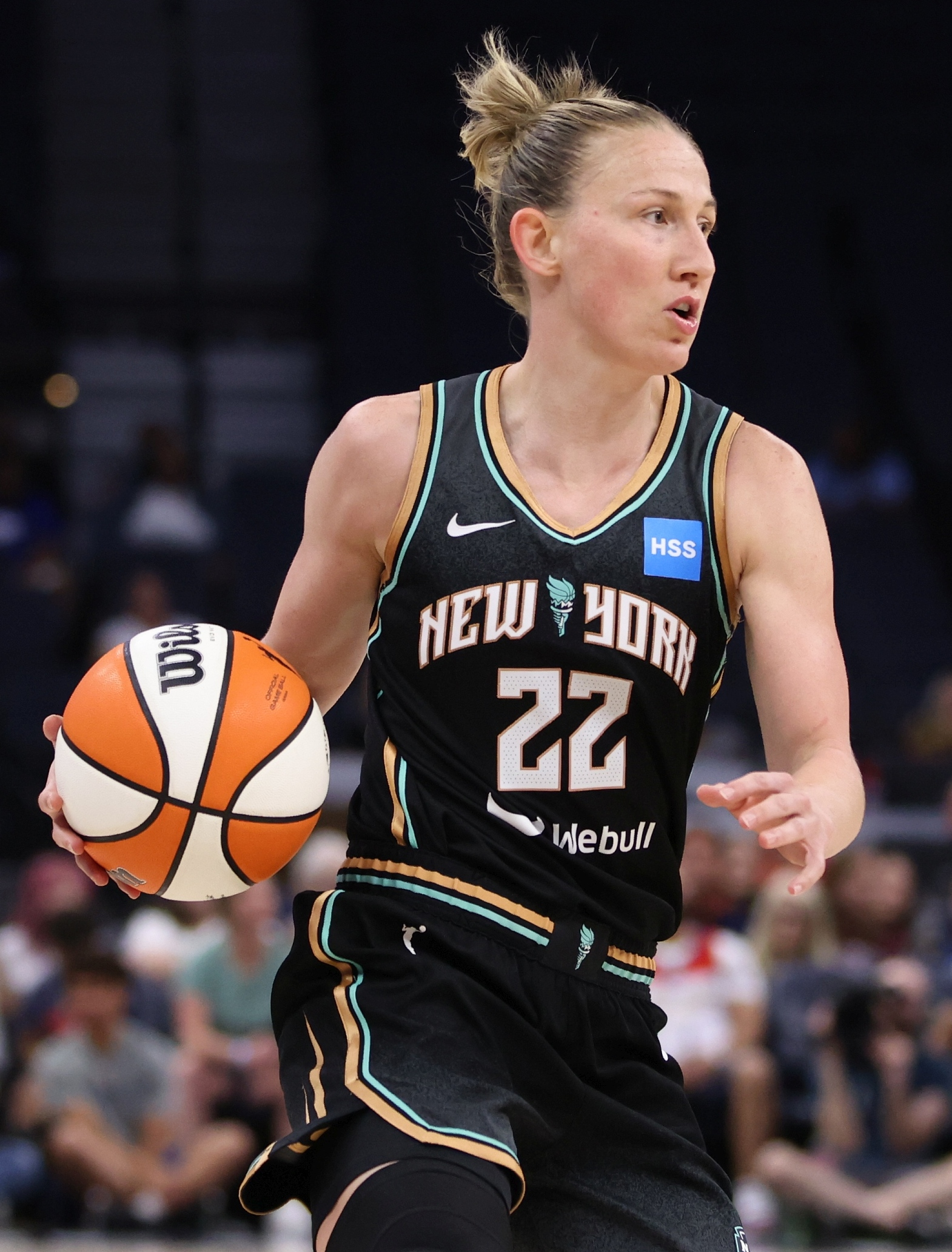
Courtney Vandersloot (pictured) along with Ticha Penicheiro won a record seven assists titles in there career.

In basketball, an assist is a pass to a teammate that directly leads to a score by field goal. The Women's National Basketball Association's (WNBA) assist title is awarded to the player with the highest assists per game average in a given season.

Courtney Vandersloot holds the all-time record for assists per game (10.00) in a season, achieved in the 2020 season. Alyssa Thomas holds the all-time record for assists in a season (358), achieved in the 2026 season.

Courtney Vandersloot and Ticha Penicheiro have the most assists titles in a career, each with seven. Sue Bird and Lindsay Whalen have each won three assists titles. Nikki Teasley, and Alyssa Thomas have each won two assists titles. Ticha Penicheiro also holds the record for most consecutive seasons leading the league in assists with six accomplishing this in the 1998 season, 1999 season, 2000 season, 2001 season, 2002 season, and 2003 season. Other players to have consecutive seasons leading the league in assists include Courtney Vandersloot in the 2017 season, 2018 season, and 2019 season, 2020 season, 2021 season, Alyssa Thomas in the 2025 season, 2026 season and Lindsay Whalen in the 2011 season, and 2012 season.

== Key ==
^		Denotes player who is still active in the WNBA			
*		Inducted into the Naismith Memorial Basketball Hall of Fame			
†		Not yet eligible for Hall of Fame consideration (Note: A player is not eligible for induction into the Naismith Memorial Basketball Hall of Fame until she has been fully retired for two calendar years.)			
§		1st time eligible for Hall of Fame in 2025			
Player (X)		Denotes the number of times the player had been the assists leader up to and including that season			
G	Guard	F	Forward	C	Center

== Annual leaders ==
Season	Player	Position (Note: The player's primary position is listed.)	Team	Games played	Total assists	Assists per game	References
1997	Teresa Weatherspoon*	G	New York Liberty	28	173	6.18	
1998	Ticha Penicheiro	G	Sacramento Monarchs	30	224	7.47	
1999	Ticha Penicheiro (2)	G	Sacramento Monarchs	32	226	7.06	
2000	Ticha Penicheiro (3)	G	Sacramento Monarchs	30	236	7.87	
2001	Ticha Penicheiro (4)	G	Sacramento Monarchs	23	172	7.48	
2002	Ticha Penicheiro (5)	G	Sacramento Monarchs	24	192	8.00	
2003	Ticha Penicheiro (6)	G	Sacramento Monarchs	34	229	6.74	
2004	Nikki Teasley	G	Los Angeles Sparks	34	207	6.09	
2005	Sue Bird*	G	Seattle Storm	30	176	5.87	
2006	Nikki Teasley (2)	G	Washington Mystics	34	183	5.38	
2007	Becky Hammon*	G	San Antonio Silver Stars	28	140	5.00	
2008	Lindsay Whalen*	G	Connecticut Sun	31	166	5.35	
2009	Sue Bird* (2)	G	Seattle Storm	31	179	5.77	
2010	Ticha Penicheiro (7)	G	Los Angeles Sparks	32	220	6.88	
2011	Lindsay Whalen* (2)	G	Minnesota Lynx	34	199	5.85	
2012	Lindsay Whalen* (3)	G	Minnesota Lynx	33	178	5.39	
2013	Danielle Robinson^{†}	G	San Antonio Silver Stars	25	168	6.72	
2014	Courtney Vandersloot^	G	Chicago Sky	18	101	5.61	
2015	Candace Parker*	F	Los Angeles Sparks	16	100	6.25	
2016	Sue Bird* (3)	G	Seattle Storm	34	196	5.76	
2017	Courtney Vandersloot^ (2)	G	Chicago Sky	27	218	8.07	
2018	Courtney Vandersloot^ (3)	G	Chicago Sky	30	258	8.60	
2019	Courtney Vandersloot^ (4)	G	Chicago Sky	33	300	9.09	
2020	Courtney Vandersloot^ (5)	G	Chicago Sky	22	220	10.00	
2021	Courtney Vandersloot^ (6)	G	Chicago Sky	32	275	8.59	
2022	Natasha Cloud^	G	Washington Mystics	34	239	7.03	
2023	Courtney Vandersloot^ (7)	G	New York Liberty	39	314	8.05	
2024	Caitlin Clark^	G	Indiana Fever	40	337	8.43	
2025	Alyssa Thomas^	PF	Phoenix Mercury	39	357	9.15	
2026	Alyssa Thomas^ (2)	PF	Phoenix Mercury	42	358	8.52	

== Multiple-time leaders ==
Rank	Player	Team	Times leader	Years
1	Ticha Penicheiro	Sacramento Monarchs (6) / Los Angeles Sparks (1)	7	1998, 1999, 2000, 2001, 2002, 2003, 2010
1	Courtney Vandersloot	Chicago Sky (6) / New York Liberty (1)	7	2014, 2017, 2018, 2019, 2020, 2021, 2023
3	Sue Bird	Seattle Storm	3	2005, 2009, 2016
3	Lindsay Whalen	Connecticut Sun (1) / Minnesota Lynx (2)	3	2008, 2011, 2012
5	Nikki Teasley	Los Angeles Sparks (1) / Washington Mystics (1)	2	2004, 2006
5	Alyssa Thomas	Phoenix Mercury	2	2025, 2026

== See also ==
- WNBA Peak Performers
