= WNBA Peak Performers =

Annual award in basketball

The Women's National Basketball Association Peak Performer awards are given each year to players who lead the WNBA in scoring, rebounding, and assists. The award has been given since the league's inaugural season, but the honor has varied since then.

Legend

‡	Denotes new WNBA record at conclusion of that season
	Denotes player who won MVP that year

== 1997 ==
In 1997, the Peak Performer awards were given to the "shooting champions" from each conference.

Year	Shooting Champion				
Year	Eastern Conference	Team	Western Conference	Team	Ref.
1997	Andrea Congreaves	Charlotte Sting	Haixia Zheng	Los Angeles Sparks	

== 1998–2001 ==
From 1998 to 2001, the Peak Performer awards were given to players who had the best field goal and free throw percentages in the league.

Year	Field goal percentage	Team	Statistic	Free throw percentage	Team	Statistic	Ref.
1998	Isabelle Fijalkowski	Cleveland Rockers	54.7%	Sandy Brondello	Detroit Shock	92.3%	
1999	Murriel Page	Washington Mystics	57.4%	Eva Nemcova	Cleveland Rockers	98.4%	
2000	Murriel Page (2)	Washington Mystics	59.0%	Jennifer Azzi	Utah Starzz	93.0%	
2001	Latasha Byears	Los Angeles Sparks	60.2%	Elena Baranova	Miami Sol	93.0%	

== 2002–present ==
In 2002, the WNBA changed the Peak Performer awards, to be given to the players who led the league in scoring and rebounding per game during the regular season.

In 2005, a Peak Performer award was added, to be given to the player who led the league in assists per game during the regular season.

Year	Scoring	Team	Stat.	Rebounding	Team	Stat.	Assists	Team	Stat.	Ref.
2002	Chamique Holdsclaw	Washington Mystics	19.9 ppg	Chamique Holdsclaw	Washington Mystics	11.6 rpg ‡	N/A			
2003	Lauren Jackson	Seattle Storm	21.2 ppg	Chamique Holdsclaw (2)	Washington Mystics	10.9 rpg	N/A			
2004	Lauren Jackson (2)	Seattle Storm	20.5 ppg	Lisa Leslie	Los Angeles Sparks	9.9 rpg	N/A			
2005	Sheryl Swoopes	Houston Comets	18.6 ppg	Cheryl Ford	Detroit Shock	9.8 rpg	Sue Bird	Seattle Storm	5.9 apg	
2006	Diana Taurasi	Phoenix Mercury	25.3 ppg ‡	Cheryl Ford (2)	Detroit Shock	11.3 rpg	Nikki Teasley	Washington Mystics		
2007	Lauren Jackson (3)	Seattle Storm	23.8 ppg	Lauren Jackson	Seattle Storm	9.7 rpg	Becky Hammon	San Antonio Silver Stars	5.0 apg	
2008	Diana Taurasi (2)	Phoenix Mercury	24.1 ppg	Candace Parker	Los Angeles Sparks	9.5 rpg	Lindsay Whalen	Connecticut Sun	5.4 apg	
2009	Diana Taurasi (3)	Phoenix Mercury	20.4 ppg	Candace Parker (2)	Los Angeles Sparks	9.8 rpg	Sue Bird (2)	Seattle Storm	5.8 apg	
2010	Diana Taurasi (4)	Phoenix Mercury	22.6 ppg	Tina Charles	Connecticut Sun	11.7 rpg ‡	Ticha Penicheiro	Los Angeles Sparks	6.9 apg	
2011	Diana Taurasi (5)	Phoenix Mercury	21.6 ppg	Tina Charles (2)	Connecticut Sun	11.0 rpg	Lindsay Whalen (2)	Minnesota Lynx	5.9 apg	
2012	Angel McCoughtry	Atlanta Dream	21.4 ppg	Tina Charles (3)	Connecticut Sun	10.5 rpg	Lindsay Whalen (3)	Minnesota Lynx	5.4 apg	
2013	Angel McCoughtry (2)	Atlanta Dream	21.5 ppg	Sylvia Fowles	Chicago Sky	11.5 rpg	Danielle Robinson	San Antonio Silver Stars	6.7 apg	
2014	Maya Moore	Minnesota Lynx	23.9 ppg	Courtney Paris	Tulsa Shock	10.2 rpg	Diana Taurasi	Phoenix Mercury	5.7 apg	
2015	Elena Delle Donne	Chicago Sky	23.4 ppg	Courtney Paris (2)	Tulsa Shock	9.3 rpg	Courtney Vandersloot	Chicago Sky	5.8 apg	
2016	Tina Charles	New York Liberty	21.5 ppg	Tina Charles (4)	New York Liberty	9.9 rpg	Sue Bird (3)	Seattle Storm	5.8 apg	
2017	Brittney Griner	Phoenix Mercury	21.9 ppg	Jonquel Jones	Connecticut Sun	11.9 rpg ‡	Courtney Vandersloot (2)	Chicago Sky	8.1 apg ‡	
2018	Liz Cambage	Dallas Wings	23.0 ppg	Sylvia Fowles (2)	Minnesota Lynx	11.9 rpg ‡	Courtney Vandersloot (3)	Chicago Sky	8.6 apg ‡	
2019	Brittney Griner (2)	Phoenix Mercury	20.7 ppg	Jonquel Jones (2)	Connecticut Sun	9.7 rpg	Courtney Vandersloot (4)	Chicago Sky	9.1 apg ‡	
2020	Arike Ogunbowale	Dallas Wings	22.8 ppg	Candace Parker (3)	Los Angeles Sparks	9.7 rpg	Courtney Vandersloot (5)	Chicago Sky	10.0 apg ‡	
2021	Tina Charles (2)	Washington Mystics	23.4 ppg	Jonquel Jones (3)	Connecticut Sun	11.2 rpg	Courtney Vandersloot (6)	Chicago Sky	8.6 apg	
2022	Breanna Stewart	Seattle Storm	21.8 ppg	Sylvia Fowles (3)	Minnesota Lynx	9.8 rpg	Natasha Cloud	Washington Mystics	7.0 apg	
2023	Jewell Loyd	Seattle Storm	24.7 ppg	Alyssa Thomas	Connecticut Sun	9.9 rpg	Courtney Vandersloot (7)	New York Liberty	8.1 apg	
2024	A'ja Wilson	Las Vegas Aces	26.9 ppg ‡	Angel Reese	Chicago Sky	13.1 rpg ‡	Caitlin Clark	Indiana Fever	8.4 apg	
2025	A'ja Wilson (2)	Las Vegas Aces	23.4 ppg	Angel Reese (2) (Note: Reese did not meet the statistical minimum for this award for total games played but did qualify due to her total number of rebounds exceeding the statistical minimum set by the league.)	Chicago Sky	12.6 rpg	Alyssa Thomas (2)	Phoenix Mercury	9.2 apg	
2026	A'ja Wilson (3)	Las Vegas Aces	26.2 ppg	Angel Reese (3)	Atlanta Dream	12.1 rpg	Alyssa Thomas (3)	Phoenix Mercury	8.5 apg	

== See also ==
- List of sports awards honoring women
