= 2011 Seattle Storm season =

- Head coach: Brian Agler
- Arena: KeyArena

Results
- Record: 21–13 (.618)
- Place: 2nd (Western)
- Playoff finish: Lost in Conference Semifinals (2-1) to Phoenix Mercury

Media
- Television: KONG; ESPN2, NBATV
- Radio: KPTK

The 2011 WNBA season was the 12th season for the Seattle Storm of the Women's National Basketball Association.

== Transactions ==
=== WNBA draft ===
The following are the Storm's selections in the 2011 WNBA draft.

Round	Pick	Player	Nationality	School/team/country
1	12	Jasmine Thomas	United States	Duke
2	24	Ify Ibekwe	United States	Arizona
3	36	Krystal Thomas	United States	Duke

=== Transaction log ===
- February 2: The Storm re-signed Camille Little.
- February 9: The Storm signed Erin Phillips and Belinda Snell.
- March 1: The Storm re-signed Swin Cash.
- March 15: The Storm re-signed Ashley Robinson and signed Aneika Henry to a training camp contract.
- April 8: The Storm signed Bridgette Mitchell to a training camp contract.
- April 14: The Storm signed Breanna Salley to a training camp contract.
- April 22: The Storm signed Lauren Prochaska to a training camp contract.
- April 29: The Storm traded Jasmine Thomas and a first-round pick in the 2012 draft to the Washington Mystics, and Erin Phillips and a third-round pick in the 2012 draft to the Indiana Fever, in exchange for Katie Smith and Jacinta Monroe from Washington, and a third-round pick in the 2012 draft from Indiana.
- May 17: The Storm waived Aneika Henry and Breanna Salley.
- May 22: The Storm waived Bridgette Mitchell and Lauren Prochaska.
- May 23: The Storm signed Sharnee Zoll and waived Courtney Ward.
- May 30: The Storm waived Jacinta Monroe.
- June 2: The Storm waived Sharnee Zoll.
- June 26: The Storm waived Ify Ibekwe and signed Ewelina Kobryn.
- August 1: The Storm waived Krystal Thomas and signed Allie Quigley.
- August 2: The Storm re-signed Lauren Jackson to a multi-year contract extension.

=== Trades ===
Date	Trade	
April 11, 2011	To Seattle Storm	To Indiana and Washington
April 11, 2011	Katie Smith, Jacinta Monroe and Indiana's third-round pick in 2012 draft	Jasmine Thomas, Erin Phillips, a first-round pick in 2012 draft and a third-round pick in 2012 draft

=== Personnel changes ===
==== Additions ====
Player	Signed	Former team
Belinda Snell	February 9, 2011	free agent
Ify Ibekwe	April 11, 2011	draft pick
Krystal Thomas	April 11, 2011	draft pick
Katie Smith	April 29, 2011	Washington Mystics
Ewelina Kobryn	June 26, 2011	free agent
Allie Quigley	August 1, 2011	free agent

==== Subtractions ====
Player	Left	New team
Svetlana Abrosimova	2011	hiatus
Abby Bishop	2011	hiatus
Alison Lacey	2011	hiatus
Jana Vesela	2011	hiatus
Ify Ibekwe	June 26, 2011	free agent
Krystal Thomas	August 1, 2011	free agent

== Roster ==
2011 Seattle Storm roster
Players
Coaches

Pos.	No.	Nat.	Name	Height	Weight	DOB	From	Yrs
G	10	(United States)	Bird, Sue	5' 9" (1.75m)	150 lb (68kg)	1980-10-16	Connecticut	9
F	2	(United States)	Cash, Swin	6' 1" (1.85m)	162 lb (73kg)	1979-09-22	Connecticut	9
F/C	15	(Australia)	Jackson, Lauren	6' 5" (1.96m)	187 lb (85kg)	1981-05-11	Australia	10
F/C	11	(Poland)	Kobryn, Ewelina	6' 3" (1.91m)	210 lb (95kg)	1982-05-07	Poland	R
F	20	(United States)	Little, Camille	6' 2" (1.88m)	180 lb (82kg)	1985-01-18	North Carolina	4
G	22	(United States)	Quigley, Allie	5' 10" (1.78m)	140 lb (64kg)	1986-06-20	DePaul	3
C	43	(United States)	Robinson, Ashley	6' 4" (1.93m)	180 lb (82kg)	1982-08-12	Tennessee	7
G	14	(United States)	Smith, Katie	5' 11" (1.8m)	175 lb (79kg)	1974-06-04	Ohio State	12
G	12	(Australia)	Snell, Belinda	5' 11" (1.8m)	165 lb (75kg)	1981-01-10	Australia	5
F	34	(United States)	Willingham, Le'coe	6' 0" (1.83m)	200 lb (91kg)	1981-02-10	Auburn	7
G	30	(United States)	Wright, Tanisha	5' 11" (1.8m)	165 lb (75kg)	1983-11-29	Penn State	6

Head coach
(United States) Brian Agler (Wittenberg)
Assistant coaches
(United States) Jenny Boucek (Virginia)
(United States) Nancy Darsch (Springfield)
Athletic trainer
(United States) Tom Spencer (Central Washington)
Strength and conditioning coach
(United States) Melissa Hardin

Legend

- (C) Team captain
- (DP) Unsigned draft pick
- (FA) Free agent
- (S) Suspended
- Injured

=== Depth ===
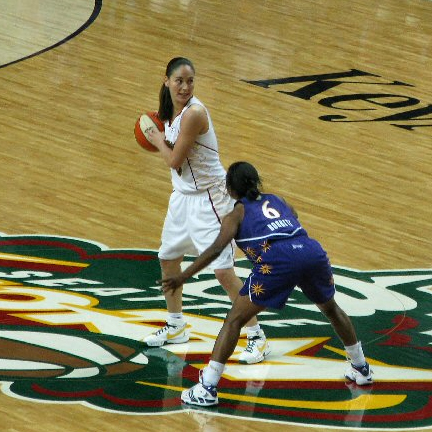
Sue Bird, on offense

Pos.	Starter	Bench
C	Lauren Jackson	Ashley Robinson
PF	Camille Little	Le'coe Willingham; Ewelina Kobryn
SF	Swin Cash	Belinda Snell
SG	Tanisha Wright	Katie Smith
PG	Sue Bird	Allie Quigley

== Season standings ==
Western Conference	W	L	PCT	GB	Home	Road	Conf.
Minnesota Lynx ^{x}	27	7	.794	–	14–3	13–4	18–4
Seattle Storm ^{x}	21	13	.618	6.0	15–2	6–11	15–7
Phoenix Mercury ^{x}	19	15	.559	8.0	11–6	8–9	11–11
San Antonio Silver Stars ^{x}	18	16	.529	9.0	9–8	9–8	11–11
Los Angeles Sparks ^{o}	15	19	.441	12.0	10–7	5–12	10–12
Tulsa Shock ^{o}	3	31	.088	24.0	2–15	1–16	1–21

== Schedule ==
=== Preseason ===
2011 Game Log: Preseason

Game	Date	Time (ET)	Opponent	Score	High points	High rebounds	High assists	Location/Attendance	Record
1	May 25	3:00pm	@ Los Angeles	66–71	Willingham (14)	Cash (6)	Wright (7)	Torodome; 3,212	0–1
2	May 29	5:00pm	Tulsa	76–70	Cash (20)	Cash (7)	Bird (8)	KeyArena; 4,979	1–1

=== Regular season ===
2011 Game Log: Regular Season
June

Game	Date	Time (ET)	Opponent	TV	Score	High points	High rebounds	High assists	Location/Attendance	Record
1	June 4	3:00pm	Phoenix	ABC	78–71	Little (18)	Little (9)	Bird (10)	KeyArena; 11,548	1–0
2	June 9	10:00pm	Minnesota		74–81	Bird (24)	Cash; Jackson (7)	Cash (5)	KeyArena; 6,291	1–1
3	June 17	10:00pm	Indiana		68–54	Cash (14)	Cash (8)	Cash (5)	KeyArena; 8,178	2–1
4	June 19	8:30pm	@ Los Angeles	PRIME	50–74	Bird (15)	Little (8)	Cash; Wright (4)	Staples Center; 9,119	2–2
5	June 21	8:00pm	@ Tulsa		82–77	Bird (21)	Cash (9)	Bird (6)	BOK Center; 4,612	3–2
6	June 24	10:00pm	Minnesota	KONG	65–55	Little (16)	Cash (9)	Bird (8)	KeyArena; 7,914	4–2

July

Game	Date	Time (ET)	Opponent	TV	Score	High points	High rebounds	High assists	Location/Attendance	Record
7	July 1	7:30pm	@ Connecticut	CSN-NE	70–75	Cash (25)	Cash (9)	Smith (4)	Mohegan Sun Arena; 7,748	4–3
8	July 3	4:00pm	@ Washington	NBATV; CSN-MA	73–63	Cash (19)	Cash (7)	Bird (5)	Verizon Center; 11,604	5–3
9	July 5	7:00pm	@ Indiana	FS-I	61–78	Bird (21)	Willingham (8)	Bird; Wright (5)	Conseco Fieldhouse; 6,525	5–4
10	July 9	10:00pm	Los Angeles	NBATV; KONG	99–80	Cash (26)	Willingham (7)	Bird (8)	KeyArena; 9,686	6–4
11	July 12	3:00pm	Washington	NBATV	79–71	Bird (22)	Cash; Smith; Wright (6)	Wright (7)	KeyArena; 13,384	7–4
12	July 14	9:00pm	@ San Antonio	ESPN2	66–69	Wright (18)	Robinson; Willingham (7)	Bird (7)	AT&T Center; 9,167	7–5
13	July 16	8:00pm	@ Minnesota		62–69	Wright (18)	Cash (9)	Smith (4)	Target Center; 7,733	7–6
14	July 19	7:00pm	@ Chicago	ESPN2	69–78	Bird (26)	Robinson (10)	Bird; Smith; Wright (4)	Allstate Arena; 6,026	7–7
15	July 21	10:00pm	San Antonio	NBATV; FS-SW	73–55	Wright (17)	Cash; Robinson (9)	Bird (7)	KeyArena; 6,922	8–7
All-Star break
16	July 26	10:00pm	@ Phoenix	NBATV	83–77	Bird (18)	Cash (8)	Bird (7)	US Airways Center; 6,108	9–7
17	July 29	8:00pm	@ Minnesota		67–92	Cash (18)	Kobryn (9)	Cash; Wright (4)	Target Center; 7,856	9–8
18	July 30	8:00pm	@ Tulsa		89–72	Bird (29)	Cash (9)	Bird (7)	BOK Center; 5,067	10–8

August

Game	Date	Time (ET)	Opponent	TV	Score	High points	High rebounds	High assists	Location/Attendance	Record
19	August 2	10:00pm	San Antonio		78–64	Bird (17)	Cash (9)	Wright (7)	KeyArena; 6,179	11–8
20	August 5	10:00pm	Connecticut	NBATV	81–79	Bird (20)	Cash (7)	Cash; Wright (5)	KeyArena; 7,289	12–8
21	August 7	3:00pm	@ Atlanta	NBATV; SSO	53–70	Cash (16)	Smith (6)	Bird (3)	Philips Arena; 7,337	12–9
22	August 9	8:00pm	@ New York	ESPN2	56–58	Bird (17)	Cash; Willingham (7)	Bird; Wright (4)	Prudential Center; 6,732	12–10
23	August 11	10:00pm	Tulsa		77–63	Little (19)	Little (7)	Bird; Little; Wright (3)	KeyArena; 6,503	13–10
24	August 13	10:00pm	Atlanta	NBATV; KONG	62–93	Smith (15)	Robinson (6)	Bird (3)	KeyArena; 9,686	13–11
25	August 16	10:00pm	@ Phoenix		79–81	Bird (23)	Cash (15)	Bird (8)	US Airways Center; 8,870	13–12
26	August 20	10:00pm	New York		63–62	Jackson (20)	Cash; Jackson (7)	Bird; Smith (4)	KeyArena; 7,139	14–12
27	August 23	10:00pm	San Antonio		63–55	Wright (16)	Cash (9)	Bird (5)	KeyArena; 6,559	15–12
28	August 25	10:00pm	Tulsa		74–57	Jackson (14)	Robinson (9)	Bird (4)	KeyArena; 6,887	16–12
29	August 28	9:00pm	Los Angeles	ESPN2	65–63	Bird; Jackson (14)	Bird; Cash (7)	Bird (4)	KeyArena; 9,686	17–12
30	August 30	10:30pm	@ Los Angeles	PRIME	62–68	Bird (15)	Cash; Wright (8)	Bird; Wright (4)	Staples Center; 9,023	17–13

September

Game	Date	Time (ET)	Opponent	TV	Score	High points	High rebounds	High assists	Location/Attendance	Record
31	September 2	8:00pm	@ Tulsa		78–72	Bird (21)	Willingham (7)	Bird; Wright (5)	BOK Center; 6,117	18–13
32	September 3	8:00pm	@ San Antonio	NBATV	70–60	Bird (15)	Cash (12)	Bird (6)	AT&T Center; 9,575	19–13
33	September 9	10:00pm	Phoenix	KONG	85–70	Smith (26)	Cash (14)	Bird (6)	KeyArena; 9,686	20–13
34	September 11	9:00pm	Chicago	NBATV; KONG	81–70	Little; Smith (17)	Cash; Little (5)	Bird; Little (5)	KeyArena; 13,659	21–13

All games are viewable on WNBA LiveAccess or ESPN3.com

=== Postseason ===
2011 Game Log: Postseason
Western Conference Semifinals

Game	Date	Time (ET)	Opponent	TV	Score	High points	High rebounds	High assists	Location/Attendance	Series
1	September 15	10:00pm	Phoenix	ESPN2	80–61	Wright (21)	Cash; Little (11)	Little (4)	KeyArena; 7,279	1–0
2	September 17	10:00pm	@ Phoenix	NBATV	83-92	Wright (18)	Cash (5)	Bird (4)	US Airways Center; 9,356	1–1
3	September 19	10:00pm	Phoenix	ESPN2	75-77	Bird (22)	Cash (10)	Smith; Wright (4)	KeyArena; 8,589	1–2

== Statistics ==
Legend
GP	Games played	GS	Games started	MPG	Minutes per game	RPG	Rebounds per game
APG	Assists per game	SPG	Steals per game	BPG	Blocks per game	PPG	Points per game
FG%	Field-goal percentage	3P%	3-point field-goal percentage	FT%	Free-throw percentage	TO	Turnovers per game
PF	Fouls per game		Team leader		League leader

=== Regular season ===
Player	GP	GS	MPG	FG%	3P%	FT%	RPG	APG	SPG	BPG	PPG
Sue Bird	34	34	33.0	.449	.428	.875	2.9	4.9	1.41	0.18	14.7
Swin Cash	34	34	33.2	.396	.285	.846	6.9	2.4	0.94	0.62	13.3
Ify Ibekwe	3	0	2.7	.000	.000	.000	1.0	0.0	0.00	0.00	0.0
Lauren Jackson	13	13	24.8	.396	.311	.884	4.9	0.3	1.00	0.85	12.2
Ewelina Kobryn	18	0	6.8	.367	.286	.667	1.2	0.3	0.28	0.33	1.4
Camille Little	33	33	26.9	.464	.227	.663	5.2	1.6	1.36	0.67	9.6
Allie Quigley	7	0	2.0	.200	.000	1.000	0.6	0.1	0.14	0.14	0.6
Ashley Robinson	34	13	17.1	.484	.000	.500	3.9	0.7	0.65	0.97	3.8
Katie Smith	34	3	25.1	.395	.395	.857	2.3	2.0	0.71	0.15	7.5
Belinda Snell	21	0	6.4	.393	.381	.846	0.7	0.3	0.14	0.10	2.0
Krystal Thomas	7	0	3.1	1.000	.000	.000	0.6	0.1	0.29	0.29	0.3
Le'coe Willingham	34	8	19.1	.473	.275	.642	4.2	1.1	0.53	0.21	6.4
Tanisha Wright	33	32	28.9	.492	.367	.897	3.2	2.9	1.21	0.03	10.1

=== Postseason ===
Player	GP	GS	MPG	FG%	3P%	FT%	RPG	APG	SPG	BPG	PPG
Sue Bird	3	3	33.7	.444	.500	.857	4.0	2.7	1.00	0.00	15.7
Swin Cash	3	3	32.0	.333	.286	.750	8.7	2.0	1.00	0.67	7.0
Lauren Jackson	3	3	27.3	.382	.385	.700	3.7	0.7	1.00	1.33	15.0
Ewelina Kobryn	1	0	4.0	1.000	.000	.500	1.0	0.0	0.00	0.00	3.0
Camille Little	3	3	23.3	.458	.000	.842	6.0	2.3	0.66	0.00	12.7
Allie Quigley	1	0	4.0	.000	.000	.000	0.0	0.0	0.00	0.00	0.0
Ashley Robinson	3	0	12.3	.375	.000	.000	3.0	0.0	0.00	1.00	2.0
Katie Smith	3	0	25.3	.174	.286	1.000	5.3	2.3	0.66	0.00	5.3
Belinda Snell	2	0	3.0	.000	.000	.000	0.0	0.0	0.00	0.00	0.0
Le'coe Willingham	3	0	13.0	.273	.000	.000	3.3	0.7	0.33	0.00	2.0
Tanisha Wright	3	0	28.0	.588	.600	.833	4.0	2.3	1.66	0.33	18.7

== Awards and honors ==
- Swin Cash was named WNBA Western Conference Player of the Week for the week of June 27, 2011.
- Sue Bird was named WNBA Western Conference Player of the Week for the week of July 4, 2011.
- Katie Smith was named WNBA Western Conference Player of the Week for the week of September 5, 2011.
- Sue Bird was named to the 2011 WNBA All-Star Team as a starter.
- Swin Cash was named to the 2011 WNBA All-Star Team as a starter.
- Swin Cash was named the All-Star Game Most Valuable Player.
- Tanisha Wright was named to the All-Defensive First Team.
- Swin Cash was named to the All-Defensive Second Team.
- Sue Bird was named to the All-WNBA Second Team.
