= Ashley Robinson =

American basketball player (born 1982)

Personal information
- Born: August 12, 1982 (age 44)
- Listed height: 6 ft 4 in (1.93 m)
- Listed weight: 180 lb (82 kg)

Career information
- High school: South Grand Prairie (Grand Prairie, Texas)
- College: Tennessee (2000–2004)
- WNBA draft: 2004: 2nd round, 14th overall pick
- Drafted by: Phoenix Mercury
- Playing career: 2004–2013
- Position: Center

Career history
- 2004–2005: Phoenix Mercury
- 2006: Chicago Sky
- 2006–2011: Seattle Storm
- 2012–2013: Washington Mystics
- 2013: Seattle Storm

Career highlights
- WNBA champion (2010); SEC All-Freshman Team (2001)
- Stats at WNBA.com
- Stats at Basketball Reference
Medals
Women's basketball
Representing United States
FIBA Under-18 Americas Championship
Gold medal – first place	2000 Argentina	Team

Ashley Robinson (born August 12, 1982), nicknamed A-Rob or Robbo, is a former professional basketball player who played for ten years in the WNBA.

== High school ==
Robinson played for South Grand Prairie High School in Grand Prairie, Texas, where she was named a WBCA All-American. She participated in the 2000 WBCA High School All-America Game where she scored eleven points, and earned MVP honors.

== College ==
Robinson attended college at the University of Tennessee and graduated in 2004.

== Career statistics ==
Legend
GP	Games played	GS	Games started	MPG	Minutes per game	RPG	Rebounds per game
APG	Assists per game	SPG	Steals per game	BPG	Blocks per game	PPG	Points per game
TO	Turnovers per game	FG%	Field-goal percentage	3P%	3-point field-goal percentage	FT%	Free-throw percentage
**Bold**	Career best	°	League leader

=== Regular season ===
Year	Team	GP	GS	MPG	FG%	3P%	FT%	RPG	APG	SPG	BPG	TO	PPG
2004	Phoenix	19	0	6.8	**50.0**	0.0	42.9	0.7	0.1	0.4	0.5	**0.2**	0.9
2005	Phoenix	**34**	**15**	**19.4**	32.6	0.0	50.0	3.5	**0.9**	**0.6**	**1.0**	1.1	3.0
2006	Chicago	12	5	10.4	31.0	**100.0**	33.3	2.8	0.5	0.2	0.7	0.8	1.8
2006	Seattle	17	0	11.7	36.0	0.0	30.0	2.6	0.4	0.4	0.5	0.7	1.2
2007	Seattle	33	5	12.4	34.9	0.0	26.7	3.0	0.4	0.5	0.8	0.8	1.5
2008	Seattle	33	1	10.0	30.2	0.0	30.0	2.2	0.4	0.4	0.6	0.8	0.9
2009	Seattle	26	2	6.4	20.0	0.0	50.0	0.9	0.1	0.1	0.5	0.4	0.5
2010	Seattle	30	0	8.2	41.3	0.0	33.3	1.9	0.5	0.1	0.7	0.6	1.4
2011	Seattle	**34**	13	17.1	48.4	0.0	50.0	**3.9**	0.7	**0.6**	**1.0**	1.3	**3.8**
2012	Washington	33	14	16.2	41.0	0.0	35.0	3.3	**0.9**	**0.6**	0.7	1.2	3.1
2013	Seattle	21	0	9.5	44.8	0.0	**60.0**	1.4	0.3	0.0	0.4	1.1	1.5
Career	10 years, 4 teams	292	55	12.3	38.3	12.5	41.7	2.5	0.5	0.4	0.7	0.9	1.9

=== Playoffs ===
Year	Team	GP	GS	MPG	FG%	3P%	FT%	RPG	APG	SPG	BPG	TO	PPG
2006	Seattle	2	0	2.5	0.0	0.0	0.0	0.0	0.0	0.0	0.0	**0.0**	0.0
2007	Seattle	2	**2**	**26.0**	36.4	0.0	0.0	**8.0**	**3.0**	**1.0**	**2.5**	1.5	**4.0**
2008	Seattle	3	1	15.3	**50.0**	0.0	**50.0**	4.0	0.7	0.3	0.7	0.7	2.3
2009	Seattle	3	0	6.0	0.0	0.0	0.0	0.3	0.0	0.0	0.3	0.3	0.0
2010	Seattle	**4**	0	1.8	0.0	0.0	0.0	0.8	0.3	0.0	0.0	0.3	0.0
2011	Seattle	3	0	12.3	37.5	0.0	0.0	3.0	0.0	0.0	1.0	0.7	2.0
2013	Seattle	2	0	8.0	0.0	0.0	0.0	1.0	0.0	0.0	0.5	1.0	0.0
Career	7 years, 1 team	19	3	9.5	35.7	0.0	16.7	2.3	0.5	0.2	0.6	0.6	1.1

=== College ===
Legend
GP	Games played	GS	Games started	MPG	Minutes per game
FG%	Field goal percentage	3P%	3-point field goal percentage	FT%	Free throw percentage
RPG	Rebounds per game	APG	Assists per game	SPG	Steals per game
BPG	Blocks per game	PPG	Points per game	**Bold**	Career high

Year	Team	GP	Points	FG%	3P%	FT%	RPG	APG	SPG	BPG	PPG
2000-01	Tennessee	34	**301**	**49.2**	0.0	51.5	5.3	0.8	0.8	1.5	**8.9**
2001-02	Tennessee	26	121	38.2	-	**52.9**	2.6	0.4	0.7	0.6	4.7
2002-03	Tennessee	**37**	215	41.8	**16.7**	39.2	5.4	0.5	0.6	1.7	5.8
2003-04	Tennessee	35	282	48.4	-	39.6	**6.4**	**1.6**	0.8	**2.0**	8.1
Career	Tennessee	132	919	45.5	7.1	44.8	5.1	0.8	0.7	1.5	7.0

== USA Basketball ==
Robinson was a member of the USA Women's U18 team which won the gold medal at the FIBA Americas Championship in Mar Del Plata, Argentina. The event was held in July 2000, when the USA team defeated Cuba to win the championship. Robinson was the leading scorer with 15 points in the opening game against Mexico. She averaged 8.4 points per game and was the third highest rebounder on the team with 5.2 per game.

== Professional ==
Robinson, a center, ranked thirteenth in the WNBA in blocks per game as of August 2008. She formerly played for the Chicago Sky and Phoenix Mercury.

Robinson will now travel to Australia to play with the Dandenong Rangers in the WNBL with her Seattle teammate, Abby Bishop, an Australian native.

Robinson helped the Seattle Storm win their second championship in 2010.

Robinson signed with the Storm on July 12, 2013, to make a return to Seattle.
