= 2006 Seattle Storm season =

- Head coach: Anne Donovan
- Arena: KeyArena

Results
- Record: 18–16 (.529)
- Place: 4th (Western)
- Playoff finish: Lost First Round (2-1) to Los Angeles Sparks

The 2006 WNBA season was the seventh for the Seattle Storm. The Storm barely made the playoffs as the 4th seed, which they later lost to the Los Angeles Sparks in three games.

== Offseason ==
=== WNBA draft ===
Round	Pick	Player	Nationality	School/Club team
1	11	Barbara Turner (G)	United States	Connecticut
2	25	Dalila Esche (F)	United States	Florida
3	39	Erin Grant (G)	United States	Texas Tech

== Regular season ==
=== Season standings ===
Western Conference	W	L	PCT	GB	Home	Road	Conf.
Los Angeles Sparks ^{x}	25	9	.735	–	15–2	10–7	15–5
Sacramento Monarchs ^{x}	21	13	.618	4.0	14–3	7–10	10–10
Houston Comets ^{x}	18	16	.529	7.0	12–5	6–11	11–9
Seattle Storm ^{x}	18	16	.529	7.0	9–8	9–8	10–10
Phoenix Mercury ^{o}	18	16	.529	7.0	10–7	8–9	8–12
San Antonio Silver Stars ^{o}	13	21	.382	12.0	6–11	7–10	10–10
Minnesota Lynx ^{o}	10	24	.294	15.0	8–9	2–15	6–14

=== Season schedule ===
Date	Opponent	Score	Result	Record
May 21	Los Angeles	90-67	Win	1-0
May 23	Houston	59-84	Loss	1-1
May 25	@ Phoenix	94-81	Win	2-1
May 31	@ Sacramento	66-87	Loss	2-2
June 2	Phoenix	97-87	Win	3-2
June 4	San Antonio	87-89	Loss	3-3
June 7	Chicago	86-73	Win	4-3
June 9	@ Connecticut	81-85	Loss	4-4
June 11	@ Indiana	62-69	Loss	4-5
June 14	@ Minnesota	74-66	Win	5-5
June 15	@ Chicago	74-61	Win	6-5
June 17	@ Sacramento	74-76	Loss	6-6
June 21	Phoenix	80-87	Loss	6-7
June 23	San Antonio	87-57	Win	7-7
June 25	@ Houston	74-84	Loss	7-8
June 27	Sacramento	68-53	Win	8-8
June 28	@ Los Angeles	75-67	Win	9-8
July 1	Minnesota	92-75	Win	10-8
July 9	Indiana	62-74	Loss	10-9
July 14	New York	86-66	Win	11-9
July 16	Connecticut	83-92	Loss	11-10
July 18	Sacramento	61-74	Loss	11-11
July 20	@ Charlotte	72-86	Loss	11-12
July 22	@ New York	89-54	Win	12-12
July 23	@ Washington	73-71	Win	13-12
July 25	@ Phoenix	91-85	Win	14-12
July 28	Detroit	67-77	Loss	14-13
July 30	Los Angeles	70-71	Loss	14-14
August 1	@ Minnesota	77-75	Win	15-14
August 3	Washington	86-78	Win	16-14
August 5	Charlotte	87-81	Win	17-14
August 8	@ Detroit	81-79	Win	18-14
August 10	@ San Antonio	65-75	Loss	18-15
August 12	@ Houston	72-89	Loss	18-16

== Playoffs ==
Game	Date	Opponent	Result	Record
Western Conference Semifinals
1	August 18	Los Angeles	W 84–72	1–0
2	August 20	@ Los Angeles	L 70–78	1–1
3	August 22	@ Los Angeles	L 63–68	1–2

== Player stats ==
Player	GP	REB	AST	STL	BLK	PTS
Lauren Jackson	30	230	48	24	51	585
Betty Lennox	34	137	73	36	5	465
Sue Bird	34	102	162	61	5	389
Janell Burse	27	178	22	17	25	300
Iziane Castro Marques	34	72	47	23	2	246
Barbara Turner	34	86	48	13	6	216
Tiffani Johnson	32	124	17	10	17	150
Tanisha Wright	33	60	41	11	2	124
Shaunzinski Gortman	20	48	17	11	2	56
Wendy Palmer	5	38	3	5	3	47
Edwige Lawson-Wade	26	21	29	15	1	43
Ashley Robinson	17	44	7	6	8	21
Cisti Greenwalt	5	8	0	0	0	2
Kaayla Chones	3	0	0	0	0	0
