= 2005 Seattle Storm season =

- Head coach: Anne Donovan
- Arena: KeyArena

Results
- Record: 20–14 (.588)
- Place: 2nd (Western)
- Playoff finish: Lost First Round (2-1) to Houston Comets

The 2005 WNBA season was the sixth season for the Seattle Storm. They were able to reach the playoffs, but were unable to defend their title from the year before.

== Offseason ==
=== WNBA draft ===
Round	Pick	Player	Nationality	College/School/Team
1	12	Tanisha Wright (G)	United States	Penn State
2	25	Ashley Battle (F)	United States	Connecticut
3	38	Steffanie Blackmon (F)	United States	Baylor

== Regular season ==
=== Season standings ===
Western Conference	W	L	PCT	GB	Home	Road	Conf.
Sacramento Monarchs ^{x}	25	9	.735	–	15–2	10–7	17–5
Seattle Storm ^{x}	20	14	.588	5.0	14–3	6–11	13–9
Houston Comets ^{x}	19	15	.559	6.0	11–6	8–9	11–11
Los Angeles Sparks ^{x}	17	17	.500	8.0	11–6	6–11	12–10
Phoenix Mercury ^{o}	16	18	.471	9.0	11–6	5–12	12–10
Minnesota Lynx ^{o}	14	20	.412	11.0	11–6	3–14	9–13
San Antonio Silver Stars ^{o}	7	27	.206	18.0	5–12	2–15	3–19

=== Season schedule ===
Date	Opponent	Score	Result	Record
May 21	Los Angeles	50-68	Loss	0-1
May 27	Houston	79-69	Win	1-1
May 29	San Antonio	79-51	Win	2-1
June 2	@ Phoenix	78-67	Win	3-1
June 4	Indiana	83-77	Win	4-1
June 7	@ Connecticut	69-81	Loss	4-2
June 8	@ Detroit	76-61	Win	5-2
June 10	@ Washington	52-64	Loss	5-3
June 12	@ Charlotte	62-60	Win	6-3
June 15	Minnesota	81-86	Loss	6-4
June 22	Connecticut	95-86	Win	7-4
June 24	@ Los Angeles	65-76	Loss	7-5
June 26	@ Minnesota	70-73	Loss	7-6
June 28	@ Houston	67-71	Loss	7-7
June 30	@ San Antonio	69-81	Loss	7-8
July 3	Sacramento	74-67	Win	8-8
July 6	@ Phoenix	61-73	Loss	8-9
July 13	Washington	71-78	Loss	8-10
July 15	San Antonio	92-70	Win	9-10
July 16	@ Los Angeles	78-70	Win	10-10
July 19	New York	87-78	Win	11-10
July 23	Detroit	74-71	Win	12-10
July 29	Charlotte	79-68	Win	13-10
July 31	Los Angeles	77-72	Win	14-10
August 4	@ Indiana	68-78	Loss	14-11
August 6	@ New York	67-79	Loss	14-12
August 9	Houston	71-68	Win	15-12
August 12	@ Minnesota	72-66	Win	16-12
August 14	@ Houston	72-75	Loss	16-13
August 18	Minnesota	76-60	Win	17-13
August 20	@ Sacramento	65-75	Loss	17-14
August 23	@ San Antonio	78-51	Win	18-14
August 25	Sacramento	76-63	Win	19-14
August 27	Phoenix	85-74	Win	20-14
August 30 (1st Round, G1)	@ Houston	75-67	Win	1-0
September 1 (1st Round, G2)	Houston	64-67	Loss	1-1
September 3 (1st Round, G3)	Houston	58-75	Loss	1-2

== Player stats ==
Player	Minutes	Field goals	Rebounds	Assists	Steals	Blocks	Points
Lauren Jackson	1176	206	313	57	36	67	597
Sue Bird	1020	130	72	176	29	6	364
Betty Lennox	800	123	124	57	35	5	346
Janell Burse	859	127	199	23	19	40	340
Iziane Castro Marques	879	93	97	49	18	4	269
Suzy Batkovic	461	76	94	26	17	24	199
Tanisha Wright	528	49	57	53	18	3	122
Francesca Zara	413	34	39	51	16	1	90
Alicia Thompson	329	32	45	14	4	4	83
Simone Edwards	201	24	31	3	4	2	55
Natalia Vodopyanova	98	8	20	10	3	2	25
Mandisa Stevenson	53	3	6	1	2	0	6
Ashley Battle	8	1	2	0	0	0	2
