= 2007 Seattle Storm season =

- Head coach: Anne Donovan
- Arena: KeyArena

Results
- Record: 17–17 (.500)
- Place: 4th (Western)
- Playoff finish: Lost First Round (2-0) to Phoenix Mercury

The 2007 WNBA season was the eighth for the Seattle Storm. The Storm struggled through the season, but they were able to reach the playoffs, falling in the first round to eventual champion, Phoenix Mercury.

== Offseason ==
=== Dispersal Draft ===
Based on the Storm's 2006 record, they would pick 7th in the Charlotte Sting dispersal draft. The Storm picked Tye'sha Fluker.

=== WNBA draft ===
Round	Pick	Player	Nationality	School/Club team
1	7	Katie Gearlds	United States	Purdue
3	33	Brandie Hoskins	United States	Ohio State

== Regular season ==
=== Season standings ===
Western Conference	W	L	PCT	GB	Home	Road	Conf.
Phoenix Mercury ^{x}	23	11	.676	–	12–5	11–6	17–5
San Antonio Silver Stars ^{x}	20	14	.588	3.0	9–8	11–6	13–9
Sacramento Monarchs ^{x}	19	15	.559	4.0	12–5	7–10	12–10
Seattle Storm ^{x}	17	17	.500	6.0	12–5	5–12	11–11
Houston Comets ^{o}	13	21	.382	10.0	7–10	6–11	10–12
Minnesota Lynx ^{o}	10	24	.294	13.0	7–10	3–14	8–14
Los Angeles Sparks ^{o}	10	24	.294	13.0	5–12	5–12	6–16

=== Season schedule ===
Date	Opponent	Score	Result	Record
May 19	Houston	82-69	Win	1-0
May 23	Phoenix	100-87	Win	2-0
May 25	@ San Antonio	71-82	Loss	2-1
June 2	San Antonio	68-78	Loss	2-2
June 7	@ Sacramento	72-81	Loss	2-3
June 9	Minnesota	90-76	Win	3-3
June 12	@ Chicago	81-69	Win	4-3
June 13	@ Indiana	62-90	Loss	4-4
June 15	Houston	84-71	Win	5-4
June 20	Detroit	71-87	Loss	5-5
June 22	@ Minnesota	76-78	Loss	5-6
June 24	@ Los Angeles	83-71	Win	6-6
June 26	Chicago	94-76	Win	7-6
June 28	@ Houston	76-81	Loss	7-7
July 1	New York	84-53	Win	8-7
July 3	Los Angeles	90-71	Win	9-7
July 6	@ Houston	71-55	Win	10-7
July 7	@ San Antonio	73-80	Loss	10-8
July 10	@ Los Angeles	82-47	Win	11-8
July 11	Connecticut	63-76	Loss	11-9
July 17	@ Phoenix	79-89	Loss	11-10
July 20	@ Connecticut	58-76	Loss	11-11
July 22	@ New York	77-75	Win	12-11
July 24	@ Washington	96-97 (OT)	Loss	12-12
July 27	Indiana	89-75	Win	13-12
July 29	San Antonio	88-92	Loss	13-13
July 31	Sacramento	74-78	Loss	13-14
August 3	@ Sacramento	76-82	Loss	13-15
August 4	Phoenix	111-101	Win	14-15
August 7	@ Minnesota	74-95	Loss	14-16
August 9	@ Detroit	70-97	Loss	14-17
August 11	Washington	91-68	Win	15-17
August 14	Minnesota	81-67	Win	16-17
August 17	Los Angeles	97-77	Win	17-17

== Playoffs ==
Game	Date	Opponent	Result	Record
Western Conference Semifinals
1	August 24	Phoenix	L 84–101	0–1
2	August 26	@ Phoenix	L 89–95	0–2

== Player stats ==
Player	GP	REB	AST	STL	BLK	PTS
Lauren Jackson	31	300	40	31	63	739
Betty Lennox	34	160	92	36	5	454
Iziane Castro Marques	34	96	95	35	4	419
Sue Bird	29	57	143	43	8	303
Janell Burse	29	154	22	13	28	256
Wendy Palmer	34	145	17	15	7	156
Tanisha Wright	34	43	69	31	2	139
Katie Gearlds	33	53	24	12	6	132
Shyra Ely	29	39	11	8	1	65
Ashley Robinson	33	100	14	16	25	48
Doneeka Lewis	6	2	6	1	0	10
Astou Ndiaye-Diatta	4	7	0	1	1	10
Shona Thorburn	2	1	0	0	0	2
Tye'sha Fluker	9	7	0	0	1	1

== Awards and honors ==
- Lauren Jackson, WNBA Most Valuable Player Award
- Lauren Jackson, WNBA Defensive Player of the Year Award
- Lauren Jackson, WNBA Peak Performer (Points)
- Lauren Jackson, WNBA Peak Performer (Rebounds)
