= Janell Burse =

American basketball player (born 1979)

Personal information
- Born: May 19, 1979 (age 47) New Orleans, Louisiana, U.S.
- Listed height: 6 ft 5 in (1.96 m)
- Listed weight: 199 lb (90 kg)

Career information
- High school: Redeemer-Seton (New Orleans, Louisiana)
- College: Tulane (1996–2000)
- WNBA draft: 2001: 2nd round, 28th overall pick
- Drafted by: Minnesota Lynx
- Playing career: 2001–2011
- Position: Center
- Number: 33

Career history
- 2001–2003: Minnesota Lynx
- 2004–2007, 2009: Seattle Storm
- 2009–2011: TS Wisła Can-Pack Kraków

Career highlights
- WNBA champion (2004); 3× CUSA Defensive Player of the Year (1999–2001); 2× First-team All-CUSA (2000, 2001); CUSA Tournament MVP (2000); CUSA Sixth Player of the Year (1999)
- Stats at WNBA.com
- Stats at Basketball Reference

Janell Latrice Burse (born May 19, 1979) is a 6'5" American women's basketball player who played center for the Seattle Storm of the WNBA.

After playing college ball at Tulane University, Burse was drafted in the second round (28th overall) by the Minnesota Lynx in 2001, and played her first three professional seasons with that team. As part of an ill-fated attempt by the Lynx to land hometown sensation Lindsay Whalen in the 2004 WNBA draft, Burse was traded with Sheri Sam to the Storm for Amanda Lassiter and a high draft pick. Whalen was snatched up by the Connecticut Sun, and Seattle gained two key players for its 2004 championship run.

Burse backed up center Kamila Vodichkova in 2004, and took over the starting role when Vodichkova left for the Phoenix Mercury the next season. Fans expected Burse to lose this job to the highly touted Suzy Batkovic when the latter joined the team in mid-season, but Burse played so well that she started the entire year.

Burse, who had purchased a house in Slidell, Louisiana in 2004, became the WNBA's face for relief in the wake of Hurricane Katrina. At two playoff games at KeyArena in September 2005, Burse's charity through the Franklin Avenue Baptist Church raised $25,000 for the relief efforts, which was matched by $75,000 from the team organization.

== WNBA career statistics ==
Legend
GP	Games played	GS	Games started	MPG	Minutes per game	RPG	Rebounds per game
APG	Assists per game	SPG	Steals per game	BPG	Blocks per game	PPG	Points per game
TO	Turnovers per game	FG%	Field-goal percentage	3P%	3-point field-goal percentage	FT%	Free-throw percentage
**Bold**	Career best	°	League leader

†	Denotes seasons in which Burse won a WNBA championship

=== Regular season ===
Year	Team	GP	GS	MPG	FG%	3P%	FT%	RPG	APG	SPG	BPG	TO	PPG
2001	Minnesota	20	0	8.5	.333	.000	.750	2.1	0.3	0.1	0.8	1.0	2.4
2002	Minnesota	31	2	11.1	.373	.000	.750	1.9	0.2	0.2	0.4	0.6	2.7
2003	Minnesota	29	14	15.1	.490	.000	**.771**	3.7	0.7	0.4	1.0	1.4	7.1
2004^{†}	Seattle	29	0	17.7	.429	.000	.582	3.3	0.7	**0.8**	**1.2**	1.4	4.9
2005	Seattle	**34**	**34**	25.3	**.523**	.000	.699	5.9	0.7	0.6	**1.2**	2.3	10.0
2006	Seattle	27	27	**27.4**	.511	**1.000**	.670	**6.6**	**0.8**	0.6	0.9	2.0	**11.1**
2007	Seattle	29	29	24.4	.445	.000	.693	5.3	**0.8**	0.4	1.0	2.0	8.8
2009	Seattle	**34**	8	15.9	.510	.000	.738	3.1	0.3	0.6	0.9	1.0	6.1
Career	8 years, 2 teams	34	8	15.9	.510	.000	.738	3.1	0.3	0.6	0.9	1.0	6.1

=== Playoffs ===
Year	Team	GP	GS	MPG	FG%	3P%	FT%	RPG	APG	SPG	BPG	TO	PPG
2003	Minnesota	3	**3**	14.0	.333	.000	.667	3.0	0.7	**1.3**	0.7	1.0	5.3
2004^{†}	Seattle	**8**	0	13.6	.444	.000	.750	2.3	0.1	1.1	**1.3**	1.0	3.4
2005	Seattle	3	**3**	**30.0**	**.611**	.000	**1.000**	**4.7**	**1.0**	1.0	0.3	0.7	9.3
2006	Seattle	3	**3**	27.0	.385	.000	.846	3.3	0.3	0.7	1.0	0.3	**10.3**
2009	Seattle	3	**3**	10.7	.000	.000	.500	2.7	0.7	0.0	0.7	1.0	0.7
Career	5 years, 2 teams	20	12	17.7	.402	.000	.788	3.0	0.5	0.9	0.9	0.9	5.2

== Tulane statistics ==
Legend
GP	Games played	GS	Games started	MPG	Minutes per game
FG%	Field goal percentage	3P%	3-point field goal percentage	FT%	Free throw percentage
RPG	Rebounds per game	APG	Assists per game	SPG	Steals per game
BPG	Blocks per game	PPG	Points per game	**Bold**	Career high

Year	Team	GP	Points	FG%	3P%	FT%	RPG	APG	SPG	BPG	PPG
1997-98	Tulane	22	93	47.4%	0.0%	46.3%	3.0	0.2	0.2	1.3	4.2
1998-99	Tulane	30	324	56.1%	0.0%	55.8%	4.9	0.3	0.4	2.5	10.8
1999-00	Tulane	**32**	**605**	59.4%	0.0%	**61.0%**	9.8	0.8	**1.4**	**2.5**	**18.9**
2000-01	Tulane	**32**	603	**59.6%**	**100.0%**	54.0%	**10.7**	**0.9**	**1.4**	2.1	18.8
Totals	Tulane	116	1625	57.9%	100.0%	56.3%	7.5	0.6	0.9	2.1	14.0
