= Sue Bird =

American basketball player (born 1980)

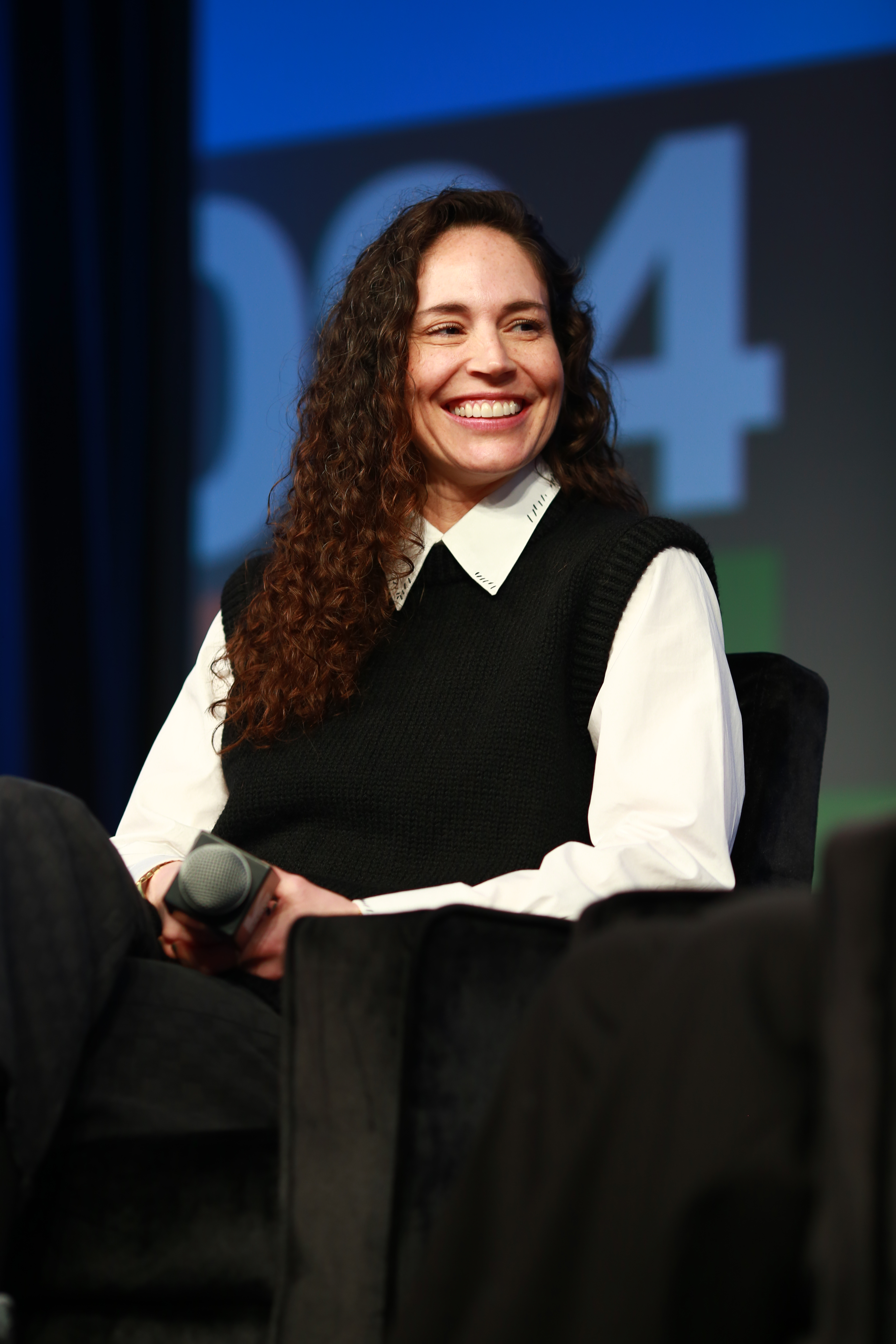
- Bird in 2024

Seattle Storm
- Title: Part owner
- League: WNBA

Personal information
- Born: October 16, 1980 (age 46) Syosset, New York, U.S.
- Listed height: 5 ft 9 in (175 cm)
- Listed weight: 150 lb (68 kg)

Career information
- High school: Syosset (Syosset, New York); Christ the King (Queens, New York)
- College: UConn (1998–2002)
- WNBA draft: 2002: 1st round, 1st overall pick
- Drafted by: Seattle Storm
- Playing career: 2002–2022
- Position: Point guard
- Number: 10

Career history
- 2002–2022: Seattle Storm
- 2004–2006: Dynamo Moscow
- 2006–2011: Spartak Moscow Region
- 2011–2014: UMMC Ekaterinburg

Career highlights
- 4× WNBA champion (2004, 2010, 2018, 2020); 13× WNBA All-Star (2002, 2003, 2005–2007, 2009, 2011, 2014, 2015, 2017, 2018, 2021, 2022); 5× All-WNBA First Team (2002–2005, 2016); 3× All-WNBA Second Team (2008, 2010, 2011); 3× WNBA assists leader (2005, 2009, 2016); 3× WNBA peak performer (2005, 2009, 2016); WNBA anniversary teams (10th, 15th, 20th, 25th); Commissioner's Cup champion (2021); No. 10 retired by Seattle Storm; 5× Russian Premier League champion (2007, 2008, 2012–2014); 5× EuroLeague champion (2007–2009, 2010, 2013); 2× Europe SuperCup winner (2009, 2010); 2× EuroLeague All-Star (2008, 2011); 2× NCAA champion (2000, 2002); AP College Player of the Year (2002); USBWA Women's National Player of the Year (2002); Naismith College Player of the Year (2002); Wade Trophy (2002); First-team All-American – AP, USBWA, Kodak (2002); Third-team All-American – AP (2001); ESPY Award – Best Female College Athlete (2002); 3× Nancy Lieberman Award (2000–2002); Senior CLASS Award (2002); Honda Sports Award (2002); Big East Player of the Year (2002); 2× First-team All-Big East (2001, 2002); No. 10 retired by UConn Huskies; Miss New York Basketball (1998)

Career WNBA statistics
- Points: 6,803 (11.7 ppg)
- Rebounds: 1,466 (2.5 rpg)
- Assists: 3,234 (5.6 apg)
- Stats at WNBA.com
- Stats at Basketball Reference
- Basketball Hall of Fame
- Women's Basketball Hall of Fame
- FIBA Hall of Fame
Medals
Representing the United States
Olympic Games
| Gold medal – first place | 2004 Athens | Team |
| Gold medal – first place | 2008 Beijing | Team |
| Gold medal – first place | 2012 London | Team |
| Gold medal – first place | 2016 Rio de Janeiro | Team |
| Gold medal – first place | 2020 Tokyo | Team |
World Championship
| Gold medal – first place | 2002 China |
| Gold medal – first place | 2010 Czech Republic |
| Gold medal – first place | 2014 Turkey |
| Gold medal – first place | 2018 Spain |
| Bronze medal – third place | 2006 Brazil |

Suzanne Brigit Bird (born October 16, 1980) is an American former professional basketball player who played for twenty years in the United States and Russia. She was drafted with the first overall pick by the Seattle Storm in the 2002 WNBA draft and played for the Storm for her entire Women's National Basketball Association (WNBA) career. During her ten seasons in the Russian Premier League, she played for Dynamo Moscow, Spartak Moscow Region and UMMC Ekaterinburg, winning five Premier League championships and five EuroLeague Women championships. Bird is considered one of the greatest players in WNBA history.

Bird had a record of 114–4 during her college career at the University of Connecticut (UConn). During her senior year, her team was undefeated and she won the Wade Trophy and the Naismith Award as College Player of the Year. She finished her UConn career ranked first in three-point field goal percentage and free throw percentage, and won the Nancy Lieberman Award three times as the top point guard in the nation.

Bird has won a joint-record four WNBA championships, two NCAA Championships, four FIBA World Cups, and is one of two basketball players—of any gender—to win five Olympic gold medals. She is one of 11 women to attain all four accolades. During her WNBA career, she was selected to thirteen WNBA All-Star teams and eight All-WNBA teams. She was voted by fans as one of the WNBA's Top 15 Players of All Time in 2011, was voted into the WNBA Top 20@20 as one of the top 20 players of all time in 2016, and was voted into The W25 as one of the top 25 players of all time in 2021. She is a member of the Women's Basketball Hall of Fame, the Naismith Basketball Hall of Fame, (Note: Attributed to multiple references:) the NYC Basketball Hall of Fame and the FIBA Hall of Fame. Bird retired from professional basketball after the 2022 WNBA season.

== Early life ==
Bird was born on October 16, 1980, in Syosset, New York, on Long Island, to Herschel and Nancy Bird. Her father's ancestry is Russian-Jewish. She has an older sister named Jen. In the 1900s, Bird's paternal grandparents immigrated to the United States from what later became Ukraine. Upon arrival at Ellis Island, their last name was changed from "Boorda" to "Bird". (Note: Attributed to multiple references:)

Bird was interested in sports from an early age, partly influenced by her athletic older sister. In addition to basketball, she played soccer and tennis and ran track. Her fifth grade yearbook lists her potential future careers as a lawyer, doctor, and professional soccer player. Bird started playing Amateur Athletic Union basketball in the sixth grade, and soon after began receiving college recruiting letters. At the age of 11, she played during halftime at a St. John's University basketball game. Her play was so impressive that a security guard asked for her autograph.

== High school career ==
Bird played her freshman and sophomore years at Syosset High School, but wanted more competition. She enrolled at Christ the King Regional High School in Queens, New York, where she played on the Lady Royals team for two seasons. During Bird's junior year, the team's record was 24–3. During her senior year the Royals went undefeated, winning the New York state championship and the national title. Bird won the New York State Player of the Year award and the New York Daily News Player of the Year award, and was named a WBCA All-American. She played in the WBCA High School All-America Game, scoring 11 points.

== College career ==
Bird was recruited by several university teams, including those of Stanford, Vanderbilt and University of Connecticut (UConn). She leaned toward selecting the UConn Huskies, partly because the UConn campus was close to her home, but hesitated when two point guards announced their commitments to the team. After one of the point guards withdrew, Bird decided to accept UConn's offer. Eight games into her freshman season, Bird suffered a torn ACL. Since she had played more than 20% of the team's games in the 1998–1999 season, she was not able to redshirt. During her sophomore season (1999–2000), she returned to lead the team to a 36–1 record, the Big East Championship, and the 2000 NCAA Division I championship. In her junior season (2000–2001), the Huskies went 32–3. In her senior season (2001–2002), the Huskies went 39–0, with Bird winning the Wade Trophy, the Honda Sports Award and the Naismith Award as College Player of the Year. During her junior year, Bird played in a game against Notre Dame which sportswriter Jeff Goldberg referred to as "the best women's basketball game ever played". He memorialized the game in his book Bird at the Buzzer, whose title refers to Bird's game-winning shot at the buzzer.

As of 2024, Bird ranks No. 39 on the list of UConn players to score 1,000 career points, with 1,378 points. She is No. 7 in career assists with 585. She ranks number 1 in three-point field goal percentage (45.9) and free throw percentage (89.2). During her career with the Huskies, she won two NCAA National Championships and three Big East Championships. In 2000, Bird was the first winner of the Nancy Lieberman Award, which is given to the top Division I point guard in the nation; she won it again in 2001 and 2002. Her record at UConn in games she played is 114–4. Bird was a member of the 2006 inaugural class of inductees to the University of Connecticut women's basketball "Huskies of Honor" recognition program.

== Professional career ==
=== WNBA ===
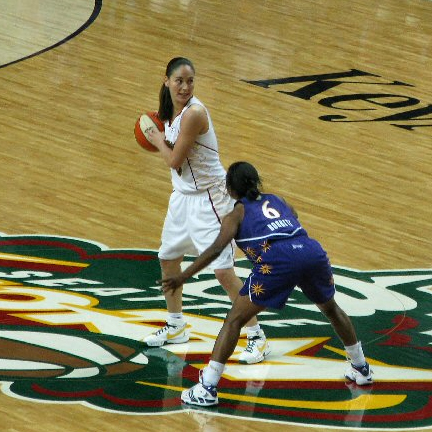
Bird during the 2008 playoffs against the LA Sparks

The Seattle Storm selected Bird with the first overall pick of the 2002 WNBA draft. She would play alongside superstar Lauren Jackson who was also drafted first overall the year before. In her rookie season, Bird started all 32 games for the Storm and averaged 14.4 ppg. She was selected as a starter on the 2002 WNBA Western Conference All-Star team. Bird was the runner-up for the Rookie of the Year award and one of only two rookies to make the All-WNBA First Team. Both Bird and Jackson led the Storm to their first playoff appearance. During her first year in the league, Bird scored a career-high 33 points in a regular-season game against the Portland Fire. From 2002 (rookie season) to 2022 (retirement), she made a record 13 appearances playing in the Western Conference All-Star team.

In 2004, the Storm acquired shooting guard Betty Lennox in a dispersal draft, joining Bird and Lauren Jackson to form a dominant trio of star players that helped lead the Storm to its first WNBA Championship. With the WNBA Championship win, Bird became one of 11 women to receive an Olympic gold medal, an NCAA Championship, Fiba World Cup gold, and a WNBA Championship. The others are Sheryl Swoopes, Cynthia Cooper-Dyke, Tamika Catchings, Brittney Griner and fellow Huskies Swin Cash, Kara Wolters, Diana Taurasi, Maya Moore, Breanna Stewart, and Asjha Jones.

En route to the Storm's second championship, Bird had one of the most clutch moments in WNBA Playoff history; during the Conference Finals against the championship-defending Phoenix Mercury with the Storm up 1–0 in the series, Bird hit a game-winning three-pointer with two seconds left in Game 2 to put the Storm up 91–88, after erasing a 19-point deficit to advance to the 2010 WNBA Finals. Also in Game 1 of the 2010 WNBA Finals, Bird hit a game-winning jump shot with 2 seconds left to put the Storm up 79–77 and would later sweep the series. In 2011, she was voted one of the WNBA's Top 15 Players of All Time by current players and coaches, the media, and fans on the WNBA website.

During the 2012 WNBA season, Bird experienced knee problems, yet she managed to play 29 games throughout the regular season and the playoffs. In the off-season, Bird had knee surgery, which would prevent her from playing the entire 2013 season.

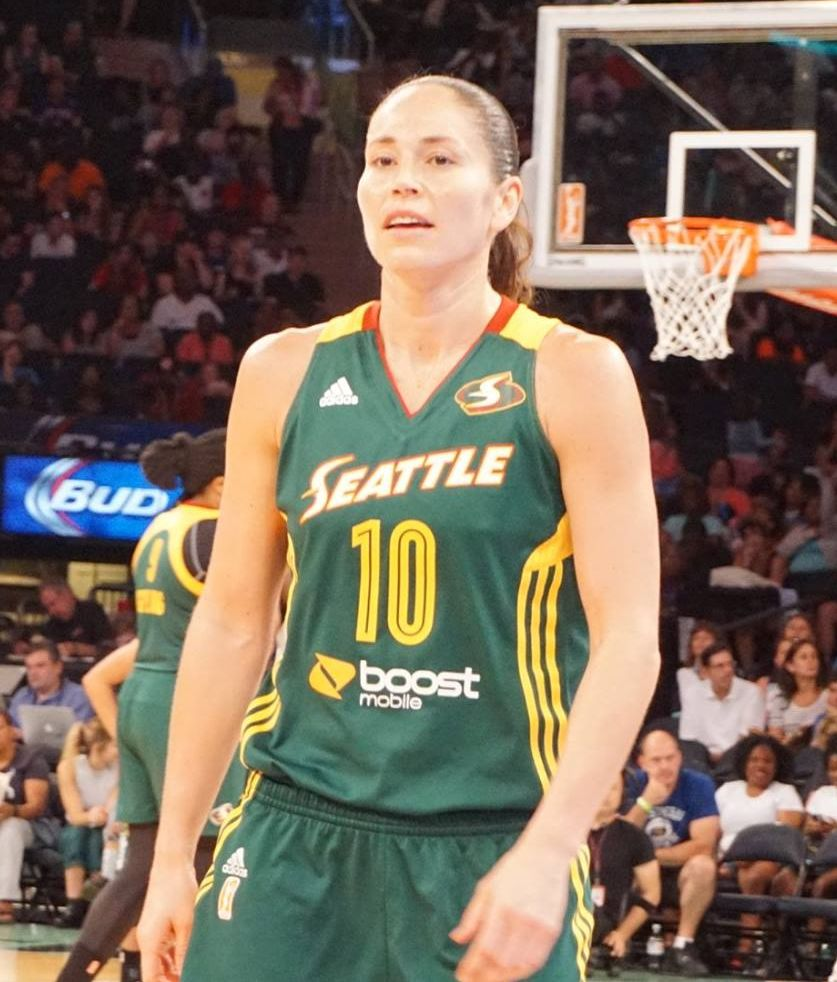
Bird during the 2015 WNBA season

Bird returned for the 2014 WNBA season. That year, she played 33 games, averaged 10.6 ppg and 4.0 apg, and was voted as a WNBA all-star. However, the Storm did not make it to the 2014 playoffs and would also fail to do so the following year.

On February 16, 2016, Bird re-signed with the Storm to a multi-year deal in free agency.

In the 2016 season, Bird would have a resurgence, putting up her best numbers since coming back from knee surgery. She averaged 12.8 ppg while shooting a career-high in 3-point field goal percentage and led the league in assists with 5.8 apg. For the fifth time in her career and the first time in 12 years, Bird was named to the All-WNBA First Team. Prior to the season, the Storm selected Breanna Stewart first overall in the 2016 WNBA draft, their second number one overall pick in a row after drafting Jewell Loyd the year before. With the addition of Stewart and Loyd quickly developing into a star player, the Storm made it back to the playoffs for the first time in 3 years with a 16–18 record. With the WNBA's new playoff format in effect, the Storm were the number 7 seed in the league and faced the Atlanta Dream in the first round, losing the single elimination game 94–85. Bird was also listed in the WNBA Top 20@20, a list of the league's best 20 players ever in celebration of the WNBA's twentieth anniversary.

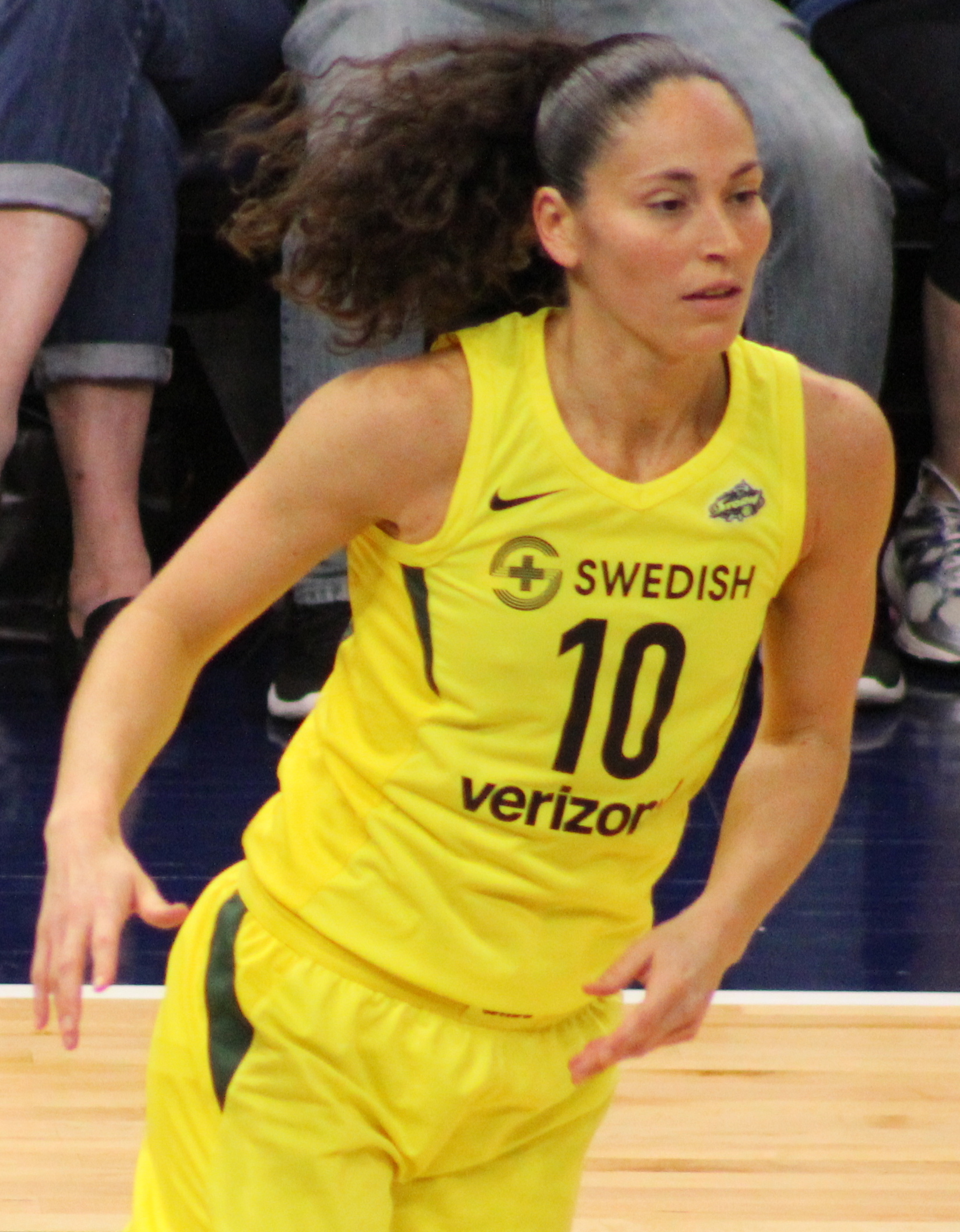
Bird playing for Seattle Storm in 2018

In April 2017, Bird underwent left knee surgery, which caused her to miss training camp. However, she returned on May 21, 2017, following her recovery and made her season debut, making her both the oldest active player and starter in the WNBA. She scored 9 points and 10 assists in an 81–71 victory over the Washington Mystics. On June 11, 2017, Bird scored a season-high 21 points and 10 assists in a 94–86 loss to the New York Liberty. She was voted into the 2017 WNBA All-Star Game, making it her 10th all-star game appearance (tying Tamika Catchings for most all-star game appearances). Bird had set the All-Star Game record for assists with a performance of 8 points and 11 assists for the Western Conference All-Stars team in a 130–121 victory. On September 1, 2017, Bird became the WNBA all-time leader in assists with a career total of 2,600 assists, passing Ticha Penicheiro in a 110–106 overtime loss to the Washington Mystics. She finished the game with 19 points and a season-high 13 assists. Bird would finish off the 2017 season, averaging a career-high in assists per game as the Storm finished 14–19 with the 8th seed in the league. The Storm would lose 79–69 to the Phoenix Mercury in the first-round elimination game.

On July 8, 2018, Bird scored a season-high 21 points in a 97–91 victory over the Washington Mystics. During that game, she became the Storm's all-time leading scorer, passing Lauren Jackson's 6,007 points. On July 19, 2018, Bird was voted into the 2018 WNBA All-Star Game, passing Tamika Catchings for most all-star appearances. On July 22, 2018, Bird broke yet another record, this time for the most WNBA regular-season games played after she passed Delisha Milton-Jones by playing her 500th game against the Atlanta Dream. By the end of the season, Bird finished with a career-high in assists, field goal shooting, and a new career-high in three-point shooting percentage as the Storm finished as the number 1 seed in the league with a 26–8 record, receiving a double-bye to the semi-finals and home court advantage throughout the playoffs. In the semi-finals, the Storm defeated the Phoenix Mercury in a hard-fought five-game series. The Storm had a 2–0 lead, lost two in a row, and finished the series with a win in game 5 at home. Bird scored a season-high 22 points in game 5. With that win, the Storm would advance to the WNBA Finals for the first time since 2010. They would sweep the Washington Mystics in the Finals, winning their first championship in 8 years.

In August 2018, Sue Bird became vice president of the WNBA players' union. During her term, Bird was a part of the leadership that navigated the WNBA during the COVID-19 pandemic in 2020 and negotiated with the league on how to play the game safely with other teams. As the MNBA worked on the players' contracts, they were united in prioritizing activism and listed their use of social justice messages during games as a top "nonnegotiable". Consequently, Bird's presidency is credited with the WNBA allowing the players to express social justice messages, for example, on jerseys and basketball courts.

In May 2019, Bird needed arthroscopic surgery on her left knee and could not play in either of the Storm's preseason games. She underwent surgery on May 30, missing the remainder of the 2019 season as she recovered. Another key player for the Storm, Breanna Stewart, also missed the 2019 season due to injuries. The Storm still secured a playoff berth, winning their Round 1 matchup of the playoffs without Bird and Stewart. The team, however, was eliminated in the second-round elimination game by the Los Angeles Sparks.

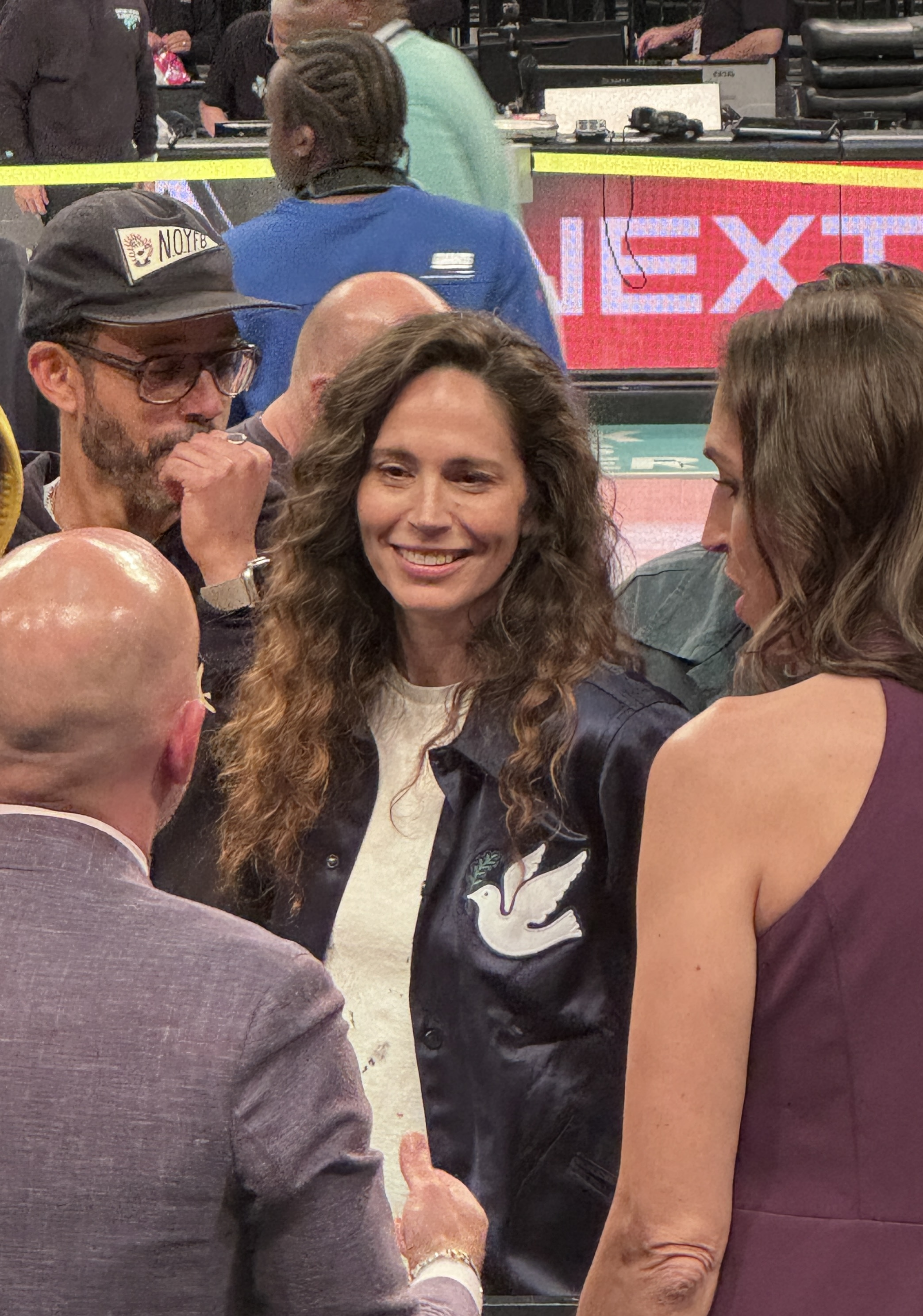
Bird greets the ESPN broadcast team after a WNBA Playoffs game between the New York Liberty and the Atlanta Dream in 2024.

In 2020, Bird returned to play, limited to playing 11 games in the regular season. Due to the pandemic, the season was delayed and shortened to 22 games, with all activities occurring at the IMG Academy in the wubble, the contained Academy area. She had reaggravated her knee during the season, causing her to miss five games. With an active roster, the Storm finished 18–4 with the number 2 seed, receiving a double bye to the semi-finals. In the semi-finals, they would sweep the Minnesota Lynx in three games, advancing back to the WNBA Finals for the second time in three years. In the Finals, the Storm would win the championship after defeating the Las Vegas Aces in a three-game sweep, earning Bird her fourth WNBA championship, making her the first player in WNBA history to win a championship in three different decades.

In 2021, Bird re-signed with the Storm on a one-year deal, which allowed her to play her 18th season in the league, moving her past Milton-Jones for most seasons played in the WNBA. During a game against the Los Angeles Sparks in July 2021, Bird surpassed Katie Smith's 6452 career points on the WNBA career scoring list with her first three-pointer, ending the game with 6490 points. She was honored in The W25 list, the WNBA's official list recognizing "the 25 greatest and most influential players in WNBA history", selected to commemorate the league's 25th season (2021).

On June 16, 2022, Bird announced that she would be retiring following the 2022 WNBA season.

On July 23, 2023, Bird's number 10 jersey was retired by the Seattle Storm during a ceremony at Climate Pledge Arena and attended by team owners and former teammates Swin Cash and Lauren Jackson.

=== Foreign leagues ===
Bird played in Russia for the Dynamo Moscow with Storm teammate Kamila Vodichkova during the 2004–05 and 2005–06 WNBA off-seasons. During the 2005–06 off-season, the Dynamo reached the Russian championship and the EuroLeague playoffs.

During the 2006–07 off-season, Bird joined Storm teammate Lauren Jackson and fellow UConn stars Diana Taurasi and Svetlana Abrosimova on the Russian team Sparta&K, winning both the Russian Super League and the EuroLeague championships. Bird played with the team during the next four WNBA off-seasons. From 2011 to 2014, Bird played during the off-season for UMMC Ekaterinburg in the Russian League, winning three consecutive league championships.

To circumvent rules which limit European basketball teams to only two American players, Bird obtained Israeli citizenship. (Note: Attributed to multiple references:)

== National team career ==
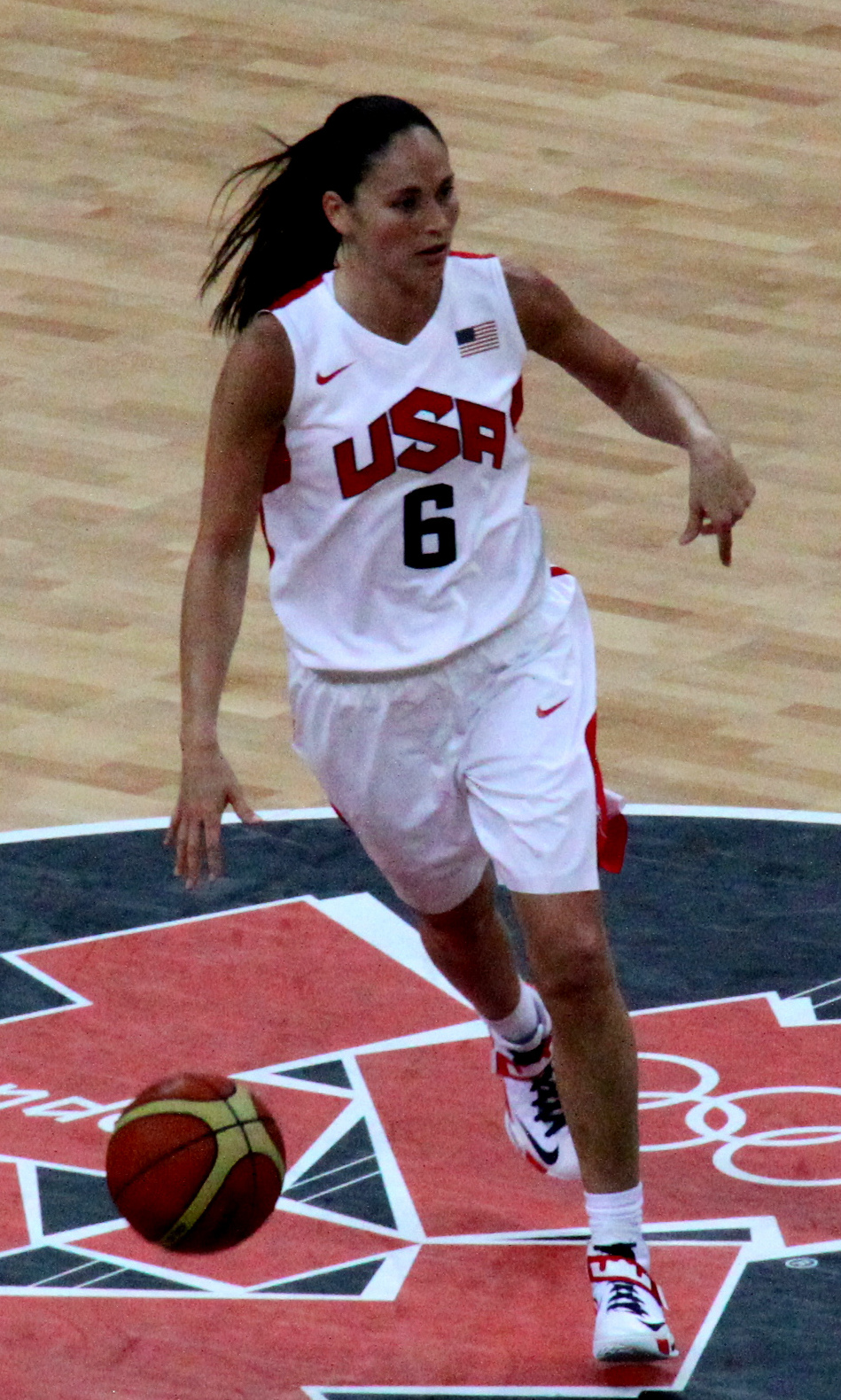
Bird playing for the USA women's national basketball team at the 2012 Summer Olympics

Bird has competed with USA Basketball as a member of the 2000 Jones Cup Team in Taipei, Taiwan. She started all four games, leading the team with 17 assists and helping them to the gold medal.

In 2002, Bird was named to the national team which competed in the World Championships in Zhangjiagang, Changzhou, and Nanjing, China. The team was coached by Van Chancellor. Bird scored 4.3 points per game. The USA team won all nine games, including a close title game against Russia, which was a one-point game late in the game.

In the 2003–2004 off-season, Bird was named to the United States 2004 Women's Olympic Basketball Team's roster. The USA team went on to win the gold at the games in Athens, Greece.

In 2006, Bird was invited back to the National team for the World Championships held in Sao Paulo, Brazil in September 2006. With Lisa Leslie and Dawn Staley retiring and Sheryl Swoopes sidelined by injuries, Bird, Candace Parker, and Diana Taurasi stepped into leading roles on the national team. The USA team won eight of the nine games they played but fell against Russia 75–68 in the medal round; they ended up with the bronze medal. Over the nine games, Bird hit 50% of her three-point attempts, tying her for accuracy leadership with Taurasi and Swoopes. She also led the team with 41 assists.

In the summer of 2008, Bird once again qualified for the Olympic basketball team, which won the 2008 gold medal in Beijing, China. Bird started all eight games and tied with teammate Tamika Catchings with 14 steals, both ranking seventh in the tournament's top 10 for steals.

Bird was invited to the USA Basketball Women's National Team training camp for the 2010 World Championship in the fall of 2009. Usually, players for the 2010 USA FIBA World Championship and the 2012 Olympics teams are selected from the National Team. Following the training camp, the team was scheduled to play in the 2009 UMMC Ekaterinburg International Invitational in Ekaterinburg, Russia.

On July 10, 2010, Bird competed with the National team in the WNBA-sponsored All-Star game, which pitted the USA National team against the "best-of-the-best" WNBA All-Stars. In non-Olympic seasons, the WNBA normally holds the annual All-Star game between top players in the Eastern and Western Conferences. University of Connecticut head coach Geno Auriemma coached the National team in this game, training camp, and through 2012. Team USA won the exhibition game 99–72, with players like Bird, who subsequently qualified for the USA team competing in the FIBA World Championships in the Czech Republic, held in September and October 2010.

Because many team members were still playing in the WNBA until just before the World Cup, the USA World team had only one day of practice with the entire 12-member squad before they opened play in Ostrava, Czech Republic. Even with limited practice, the team won its first game against Greece by 26 points. They continued to dominate with victory margins exceeding 20 points in the first five games. Several players shared scoring honors, with Swin Cash, Angel McCoughtry, Maya Moore, Diana Taurasi, Lindsay Whalen, and Sylvia Fowles all ending as high scorers in the first few games. USA's sixth game was against undefeated Australia. They took a 24-point lead and ultimately prevailed with an 83–75 victory. Team USA won its next two games by over 30 points, then faced the host team, the Czech Republic, in the championship game. They had only a five-point lead at halftime, which was cut to three points, but the Czechs never got closer. Team USA went on to win the championship and gold medal. Bird averaged 5.6 points per game and led the team in assists with 26.

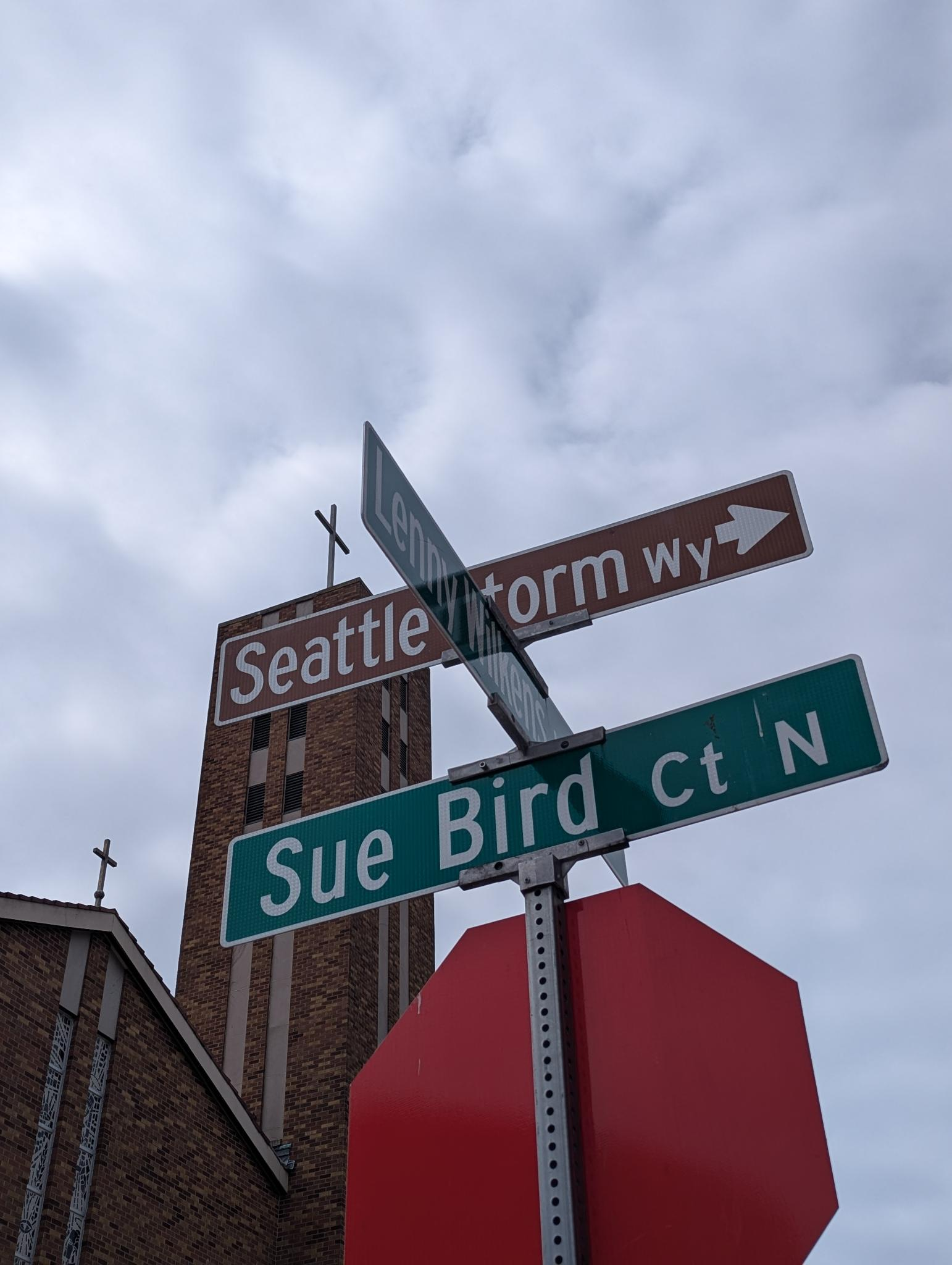
Sue Bird Court in Seattle.

Bird competed for the U.S. in the 2012 Summer Olympics. The Americans won their fifth straight gold medal.

In 2014, Bird played for Team USA during the 2014 FIBA World Championship for Women, in which they defeated Spain 77–64 to win the gold medal.

Bird competed for Team USA in the 2016 Summer Olympics, helping the team win its sixth straight gold medal. In the gold medal game, they beat Spain 101–72. This was Bird's fourth Olympic title.

In 2018, Bird once again qualified for Team USA during the 2018 FIBA Women's Basketball World Cup held in Spain. USA defeated Australia 73–56 to win the gold medal. By winning the gold medal, Bird became the only player in history, male or female, to win four World Cup gold medals. Bird finished the final with five assists, bringing her career total to 107 assists in the FIBA World Cup—making her the leader for the U.S. with the most assists at the World Cup.

On July 23, 2021, in the lead-up to her quest for her fifth gold medal, Bird carried the U.S. flag at the opening ceremony of the Tokyo Summer Olympics. Bird and baseball player Eddy Alvarez were selected by fellow athletes to be the flag bearers. Bird described the honor as "mind-blowing". The Games were delayed from 2020 due to the COVID-19 pandemic. On May 8, 2025, it was announced that Bird would be the first managing director for the USA national women's team. She will be in charge of picking the coaching staff for the 2026 FIBA Women's World Cup and the 2028 Los Angeles Olympics.

== Personal life ==
Bird publicly came out as a lesbian on July 20, 2017, revealing that she had been dating soccer player Megan Rapinoe for several months after the two met at the 2016 Rio Olympics. In 2018, Bird and Rapinoe became the first same-sex couple on the cover of ESPN The Magazine's "Body Issue", and in June 2020 they co-hosted the ESPYs with quarterback Russell Wilson. They announced their engagement in October 2020. In 2022, Bird was included on the Queer 50 list. On April 17, 2026, Bird and Rapinoe announced they had separated after 10 years as a couple.

In 2022, Bird became a part-owner of the National Women's Soccer League franchise NJ/NY Gotham FC as a minority investor. She also assists in promoting the club and acts as an advisor to the league. In April 2024, she joined Force 10 Hoops, the ownership group of the Seattle Storm. In July of the same year, Mattel announced a Sue Bird Barbie as part of the 65th anniversary of the Barbie doll.

== Career statistics ==
=== WNBA ===
Legend
| GP | Games played | GS | Games started | MPG | Minutes per game | RPG | Rebounds per game |
| APG | Assists per game | SPG | Steals per game | BPG | Blocks per game | PPG | Points per game |
| TO | Turnovers per game | FG% | Field-goal percentage | 3P% | 3-point field-goal percentage | FT% | Free-throw percentage |
| **Bold** | Career best | ° | League leader |

| † | Denotes seasons in which Bird won a WNBA championship |
| ‡ | WNBA record |

==== Regular season ====
WNBA regular season statistics
| Year | Team | GP | GS | MPG | FG% | 3P% | FT% | RPG | APG | SPG | BPG | TO | PPG |
|---|---|---|---|---|---|---|---|---|---|---|---|---|---|
| 2002 | Seattle | 32° | 32° | 35.0 | .403 | .401 | **.911**° | 2.6 | 6.0 | 1.7 | 0.1 | 3.4 | 14.4 |
| 2003 | Seattle | **34**° | **34**° | 33.4 | .421 | .350 | .884 | **3.3** | 6.5 | 1.4 | 0.0 | 3.2 | 12.4 |
| 2004^{†} | Seattle | **34**° | **34**° | 33.4 | .463 | .438 | .859 | 3.1 | 5.4 | 1.5 | 0.2 | 2.5 | 12.9 |
| 2005 | Seattle | 30 | 30 | 34.0 | .442 | .437 | .855 | 2.4 | 5.9° | 1.0 | 0.2 | 2.9 | 12.1 |
| 2006 | Seattle | **34**° | **34**° | 31.3 | .411 | .366 | .868 | 3.0 | 4.8 | **1.8** | 0.1 | 2.5 | 11.4 |
| 2007 | Seattle | 29 | 29 | 31.7 | .428 | .338 | .846 | 2.0 | 4.9 | 1.5 | **0.3** | 2.3 | 10.4 |
| 2008 | Seattle | 33 | 33 | 33.7 | .441 | .343 | .871 | 2.5 | 5.1 | 1.2 | 0.1 | 2.6 | 14.1 |
| 2009 | Seattle | 31 | 31 | **35.5**° | .408 | .360 | .854 | 2.5 | 5.8° | 1.5 | 0.1 | 2.6 | 12.8 |
| 2010^{†} | Seattle | 33 | 33 | 30.5 | .434 | .399 | .857 | 2.7 | 5.8 | 1.5 | 0.2 | 1.8 | 11.1 |
| 2011 | Seattle | **34**° | **34**° | 33.0 | .449 | .428 | .875 | 2.9 | 4.9 | 1.4 | 0.2 | 2.3 | **14.7** |
| 2012 | Seattle | 29 | 29 | 31.0 | .459 | .384 | .783 | 2.9 | 5.3 | 0.9 | 0.1 | 2.2 | 12.2 |
| 2013 | Did not play (injury) | | | | | | | | | | | | |
| 2014 | Seattle | 33 | 33 | 29.2 | .386 | .345 | .831 | 2.2 | 4.0 | 0.8 | 0.0 | 2.2 | 10.6 |
| 2015 | Seattle | 27 | 27 | 28.6 | .384 | .301 | .796 | 2.3 | 5.4 | 0.9 | 0.1 | 2.4 | 10.3 |
| 2016 | Seattle | **34**° | **34**° | 31.6 | .449 | .444 | .786 | 2.9 | 5.8° | 1.0 | 0.2 | 2.5 | 12.8 |
| 2017 | Seattle | 30 | 30 | 30.0 | .427 | .393 | .774 | 2.0 | 6.6 | 1.2 | 0.2 | 2.0 | 10.6 |
| 2018^{†} | Seattle | 31 | 31 | 26.5 | .466 | .448 | .828 | 1.7 | **7.1** | 1.1 | 0.1 | 1.9 | 10.1 |
| 2019 | Did not play (injury) | | | | | | | | | | | | |
| 2020^{†} | Seattle | 11 | 11 | 23.4 | **.494** | **.469** | .750 | 1.7 | 5.2 | 0.6 | 0.2 | **1.6** | 9.8 |
| 2021 | Seattle | 30 | 30 | 27.7 | .431 | .419 | .833 | 2.6 | 5.3 | 0.9 | 0.1 | **1.6** | 10.0 |
| 2022 | Seattle | 31 | 31 | 26.4 | .403 | .389 | **1.000** | 1.9 | 6.0 | 1.2 | 0.1 | 1.9 | 7.8 |
| **Career** | 19 years, 1 team | 580‡ | 580‡ | 31.2 | .429 | .392 | .853 | 2.5 | 5.6 | 1.3 | 0.1 | 2.4 | 11.7 |
| **Career** | All-Star | 12‡ | 11‡ | 20.6 | .463 | .395 | .714 | 2.9 | 5.8 | 0.7 | 0.2 | 1.6 | 6.8 |

==== Playoffs ====
WNBA playoff statistics
| Year | Team | GP | GS | MPG | FG% | 3P% | FT% | RPG | APG | SPG | BPG | TO | PPG |
|---|---|---|---|---|---|---|---|---|---|---|---|---|---|
| 2002 | Seattle | 2 | 2 | 36.5 | .409 | .273 | **1.000** | 0.0 | 6.0 | 2.5 | 0.0 | 2.5 | 14.0 |
| 2004^{†} | Seattle | **8** | **8** | 29.1 | .377 | .300 | .762 | 3.2 | 5.2 | 1.5 | 0.0 | 2.0 | 8.5 |
| 2005 | Seattle | 3 | 3 | 34.3 | .273 | .133 | .875 | 1.7 | 4.3 | 1.0 | 0.0 | 1.3 | 9.0 |
| 2006 | Seattle | 3 | 3 | 35.0 | .361 | .333 | .625 | 2.7 | 3.3 | 0.3 | **0.7** | 2.3 | 12.7 |
| 2007 | Seattle | 2 | 2 | 35.5 | .458 | **.583** | **1.000** | 2.0 | 5.0 | 2.0 | 0.0 | 3.0 | 16.5 |
| 2008 | Seattle | 3 | 3 | **37.0** | **.460** | .294 | **1.000** | 2.3 | 3.0 | 1.3 | 0.0 | 2.0 | **19.7** |
| 2009 | Seattle | 3 | 3 | 36.3 | .333 | .417 | .875 | 3.7 | 4.0 | 1.3 | 0.0 | 2.3 | 11.3 |
| 2010^{†} | Seattle | 7 | 7 | **37.0** | .386 | .333 | .769 | 4.1 | 7.7 | 1.7 | 0.4 | 2.0 | 12.1 |
| 2011 | Seattle | 3 | 3 | 33.7 | .444 | .500 | .857 | 4.0 | 2.7 | 1.0 | 0.0 | **0.6** | 15.7 |
| 2012 | Seattle | 3 | 3 | 35.3 | .439 | .500 | .833 | 1.7 | 7.0 | 1.7 | **0.7** | 3.3 | 16.3 |
| 2016 | Seattle | 1 | 1 | 34.2 | .357 | .333 | .000 | **5.0** | 7.0 | **3.0** | 0.0 | 2.0 | 12.0 |
| 2017 | Seattle | 1 | 1 | 31.0 | .444 | .333 | **1.000** | 2.0 | 5.0 | 0.0 | 0.0 | 2.0 | 10.0 |
| 2018^{†} | Seattle | **8** | **8** | 28.4 | .387 | .364 | .750 | 2.8 | 6.9 | 0.7 | 0.2 | 1.3 | 10.0 |
| 2020^{†} | Seattle | 6 | 6 | 26.5 | .392 | .316 | **1.000** | 2.0 | **9.2**° | 0.7 | 0.3 | 2.3 | 9.5 |
| 2021 | Seattle | 1 | 1 | 37.0 | .417 | .500 | **1.000** | 3.0 | 5.0 | 1.0 | 0.0 | 2.0 | 16.0 |
| 2022 | Seattle | 6 | 6 | 35.7 | .431 | .433 | **1.000** | 2.2 | 7.7° | 0.8 | 0.2 | 1.0 | 10.2 |
| **Career** | 16 years, 1 team | 60 | 60 | 32.9 | .396 | .365 | .845 | 2.7 | 6.1 | 1.2 | 0.2 | 1.9 | 11.7 |

=== College ===
Legend
| GP | Games played | GS | Games started | MPG | Minutes per game | FG% | Field goal percentage | 3P% | 3-point field goal percentage |
| FT% | Free throw percentage | RPG | Rebounds per game | APG | Assists per game | SPG | Steals per game | BPG | Blocks per game |
| TO | Turnovers per game | PPG | Points per game | **Bold** | Career high | | Data not available | * | Led Division I |

| * | Denotes season(s) in which Bird won an NCAA Championship |

NCAA statistics
| Year | Team | GP | GS | MPG | FG% | 3P% | FT% | RPG | APG | SPG | BPG | TO | PPG |
|---|---|---|---|---|---|---|---|---|---|---|---|---|---|
| 1998–99 | Connecticut | 8 | | | .390 | .316 | .750 | 2.0 | 3.1 | 1.5 | 0.1 | | 5.1 |
| 1999–00* | Connecticut | 37 | | | .502 | **.497** | .898 | 2.5 | 4.3 | 1.9 | 0.0 | | 10.9 |
| 2000–01 | Connecticut | 34 | | | .443 | .432 | .778 | 2.6 | 5.0 | 1.9 | 0.1 | | 10.9 |
| 2001–02* | Connecticut | **39** | | | **.505** | .466 | **.942** | **3.4** | **5.9** | **2.5** | **0.2** | | **14.4** |
| **Career** | | 118 | | | .481 | .459 | .892 | 2.8 | 5.0 | 2.0 | 0.1 | | 11.7 |

=== Records ===
- 3× WNBA assists leader (2005, 2009, 2016)
- 2× WNBA turnovers leader (2002, 2003)
- WNBA free throw percentage leader (2002)
- All-time record for All-star appearances
- All-time leader in seasons, games and minutes played
- All-time leader in assists and turnovers

== Awards and honors ==
WNBA

- 4× WNBA champion (2004, 2010, 2018, 2020)
- 13× WNBA All-Star (2002, 2003, 2005–2007, 2009, 2011, 2014, 2015, 2017, 2018, 2021, 2022)
- 5× All-WNBA First Team (2002–2005, 2016)
- 3× All-WNBA Second Team (2008, 2010, 2011)
- 3× WNBA peak performer (2005, 2009, 2016)
- WNBA 10th Anniversary Team (2006)
- WNBA 15th Anniversary Team (2011)
- WNBA 20th Anniversary Team (2016)
- WNBA 25th Anniversary Team (2021)
- Commissioner's Cup champion (2021)
- No. 10 retired by Seattle Storm
- Statue in front of Climate Pledge Arena (first statue for a WNBA player)

NCAA

- 2× NCAA National Champion (2000, 2002)
- 3× Nancy Lieberman Award (2000, 2001, 2002)
- 2× First-team All-Big East (2001, 2002)
- Big East Conference Women's Basketball Player of the Year (2002)
- Naismith College Player of the Year (2002)
- Senior CLASS Award (2002)
- Wade Trophy (2002)
- Honda Sports Award (2002)
- No. 10 retired by UConn Huskies

USA Basketball

- 5× Olympic gold medalist (2004, 2008, 2012, 2016, 2020)
- 4× FIBA World Cup gold medalist (2002, 2010, 2014, 2018)
- 2006 FIBA World Cup bronze medalist
- USA Basketball Female Athlete of the Year (2021)

International

- 5× Russian Women's Basketball Premier League champion (2007, 2008, 2012, 2013, 2014)
- 5× EuroLeague Women champion (2007, 2008, 2009, 2010, 2013)
- 2× FIBA Europe SuperCup Women winner (2009, 2010)
- 2× EuroLeague All-Star (2008, 2011)

Media

- Third Team All-American – Associated Press (2001)
- First Team All-American – Associated Press (2002)
- Associated Press Women's College Basketball Player of the Year (2002)
- USBWA Women's National Player of the Year (2002)
- All-American – United States Basketball Writers Association, Kodak (2002)
- ESPY Award – Best Female College Athlete (2002)

Halls of Fame

- Naismith Basketball Hall of Fame (class of 2025)
- Women's Basketball Hall of Fame (class of 2025)
- LGBTQ Sports Hall of Fame (class of 2025)
- NYC Basketball Hall of Fame (class of 2026)
- FIBA Hall of Fame (class of 2026)

State and local

- In 2024, the city of Seattle renamed a street near Climate Pledge Arena to "Sue Bird Court".
- In 2026, the Connecticut legislature approved a bill that named Sue Bird the state bird of Connecticut every March, alongside the American robin, which is the permanent state bird.

== See also ==
- List of athletes with the most appearances at Olympic Games
- List of Connecticut women's basketball players with 1000 points
- List of Connecticut Huskies women's basketball players with 500 assists
- List of select Jewish basketball players
- List of Jewish Olympic medalists
- List of WNBA career scoring leaders
- List of WNBA career assists leaders
- List of WNBA career steals leaders
- List of WNBA career games played leaders
- List of WNBA career minutes played leaders
- List of WNBA annual assists leaders

== Notes ==
Olympic Games
| Preceded by Erin Hamlin | Flagbearer for United States (with Eddy Alvarez); Tokyo 2020 | Succeeded by LeBron James; Coco Gauff; París 2024 |
