= Katie Gearlds =

American basketball player and coach (born 1984)

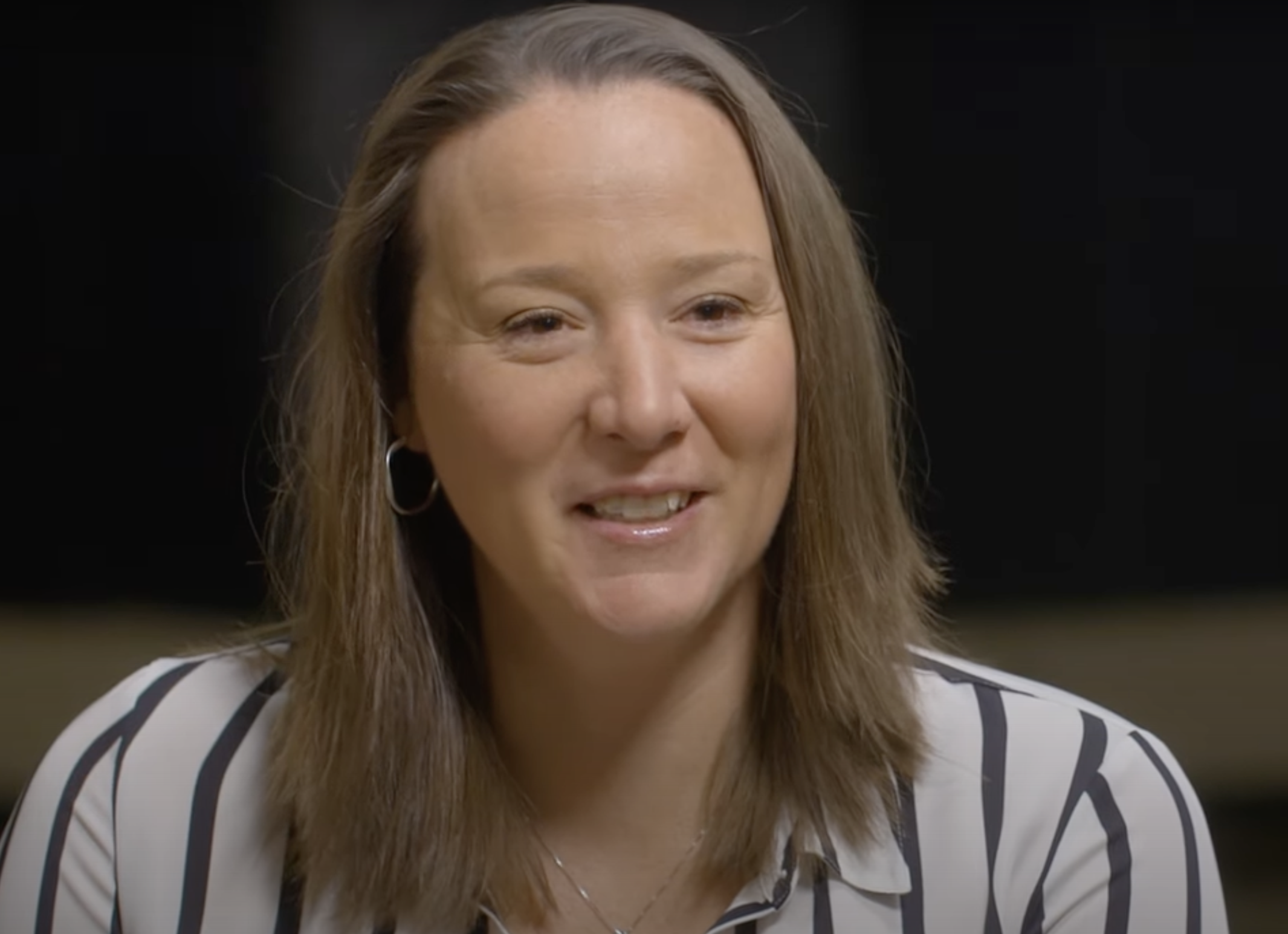
- Gearlds in 2022

Purdue Boilermakers
- Title: Head coach
- League: Big Ten Conference

Personal information
- Born: October 26, 1984 (age 42) Beech Grove, Indiana, U.S.
- Listed height: 6 ft 1 in (1.85 m)
- Listed weight: 184 lb (83 kg)

Career information
- High school: Beech Grove (Beech Grove, Indiana)
- College: Purdue (2003–2007)
- WNBA draft: 2007: 1st round, 7th overall pick
- Drafted by: Seattle Storm
- Playing career: 2007–2013
- Position: Forward
- Number: 4
- Coaching career: 2013–present

Career history

Playing
- 2007–2009: Seattle Storm

Coaching
- 2013–2021: Marian (Indiana)
- 2021–present: Purdue

Career highlights
- As player: Third-team All-American – AP (2007); Big Ten tournament MOP (2007); 2× First-team All-Big Ten (2006, 2007); Big Ten Freshman of the Year (2004); Big Ten All-Freshman Team (2004); Indiana Miss Basketball (2003); McDonald's All-American Game MVP (2003); As coach: 2× NAIA D2 National Champions (2016, 2017)
- Stats at WNBA.com
- Stats at Basketball Reference

Kathryn Ann Gearlds (born October 26, 1984) is an American women's basketball coach and former forward, who is the current head coach of the Purdue Boilermakers. She is also the former women's basketball head coach of the Marian Knights. She played college basketball at Purdue for coaches Kristy Curry and Sharon Versyp from 2003 to 2007 and played in the Women's National Basketball Association (WNBA) for three seasons from 2007 to 2009.

== High school ==
Gearlds was born in Beech Grove, Indiana and attended Beech Grove High School. In her four years, she compiled 2,521 career points, which ranked her fourth in Indiana history. She won numerous awards in her high school career, including being named Miss Basketball in 2003, after leading the Hornets to the 3A State Championship. Gearlds was also named a WBCA All-American, and participated in the 2003 WBCA High School All-America Game, where she scored ten points. She was the MVP of the 2003 McDonald's All-American Game.

== College ==
Gearlds went on to star at Purdue University. She was named the Big Ten Freshman of the Year in 2004. In her four years as a Boilermaker, she compiled 14.8 points per game, 3.8 rebounds per game, and 3.0 assists per game. The team had a 103–30 record during her tenure. She earned the Big Ten tournament Most Outstanding Player honors in 2007 after Purdue defeated Ohio State in the Big Ten championship game. She also won both the women's and overall State Farm College Three Point Championships on March 29, 2007, defeating male competitor and future NBA starter Aaron Brooks 17 to 16.

She graduated from Purdue in 2007 with a bachelor of science degree in sociology with a minor in psychology and communications.

== Career statistics ==
Legend
GP	Games played	GS	Games started	MPG	Minutes per game	RPG	Rebounds per game
APG	Assists per game	SPG	Steals per game	BPG	Blocks per game	PPG	Points per game
TO	Turnovers per game	FG%	Field-goal percentage	3P%	3-point field-goal percentage	FT%	Free-throw percentage
**Bold**	Career best	°	League leader

=== WNBA career statistics ===
==== Regular season ====
Year	Team	GP	GS	MPG	FG%	3P%	FT%	RPG	APG	SPG	BPG	TO	PPG
2007	Seattle	33	0	13.2	38.6	34.4	**88.0**	**1.6**	**0.7**	**0.4**	**0.2**	0.6	4.0
2008	Seattle	**34**	**3**	**13.8**	37.3	39.1	73.9	1.3	0.6	0.3	0.1	**0.4**	**5.0**
2009	Seattle	20	0	12.2	**39.2**	**40.4**	75.0	1.3	0.6	0.3	**0.2**	0.6	4.1
Career	3 years, 1 team	87	3	13.2	38.2	38.0	80.8	1.4	0.6	0.3	0.1	0.5	4.4

==== Playoffs ====
Year	Team	GP	GS	MPG	FG%	3P%	FT%	RPG	APG	SPG	BPG	TO	PPG
2007	Seattle	2	0	**11.5**	**50.0**	**100.0**	0.0	**1.5**	**1.5**	0.5	0.0	0.5	1.5
2008	Seattle	**3**	0	7.0	33.3	25.0	**50.0**	0.3	0.7	**1.0**	0.0	**0.0**	**2.0**
Career	2 years, 1 team	5	0	8.8	37.5	40.0	50.0	0.8	1.0	0.8	0.0	0.2	1.8

=== College career statistics ===
Legend
GP	Games played	GS	Games started	MPG	Minutes per game
FG%	Field goal percentage	3P%	3-point field goal percentage	FT%	Free throw percentage
RPG	Rebounds per game	APG	Assists per game	SPG	Steals per game
BPG	Blocks per game	PPG	Points per game	**Bold**	Career high

Year	Team	GP	Points	FG%	3P%	FT%	RPG	APG	SPG	BPG	PPG
2003–04	Purdue	33	350	**47.6**	**45.7**	73.2	2.7	2.1	1.2	0.5	10.6
2004–05	Purdue	30	422	39.6	31.9	89.0	3.8	3.0	**1.6**	**1.0**	14.1
2005–06	Purdue	33	495	43.6	37.3	84.8	4.1	**3.6**	1.0	0.8	15.0
2006–07	Purdue	**37**	**707**	44.2	38.9	**89.5**	**4.9**	3.3	1.6	0.4	**19.1**
Career	Purdue	133	1974	43.6	37.9	86.3	3.9	3.0	1.4	0.6	14.8

== WNBA and overseas career ==
On April 4, 2007, Gearlds was selected by the Seattle Storm with the seventh overall pick in the 2007 WNBA draft. In her rookie campaign, Gearlds appeared in 33 games for the Storm. She averaged 4.0 points per game, 1.6 rebounds per game, and 1.5 assists per game. She only played two more WNBA seasons (all with Seattle), appearing in 87 total games and averaging 4.4 points per game.

However, Gearlds playing career continued overseas. She spent two seasons (2011–12) in Spain as a professional player, and she also spent three years (2008–10) in Greece where she played and served as an assistant coach. She also spent some of 2007 in Slovakia as a player. In early 2013, she spent the year playing in Portugal and averaged 14.3 points per game for Alges where she was part of the league and cup championship teams.

== Coaching career ==
On July 16, 2013, Gearlds was named the head coach of the women's basketball team at Marian University.

In just her second season, Gearlds led the Knights to a 28–6 record, earning the program's second-ever NAIA Division II National Championship Tournament berth, and first Crossroads League title. In her third season, she led the Knights to a record of 32–6 (.842) and won the 2016 National title, the first in program history. The Knights repeated as National Champions in 2017, winning their final 23 games to finish with a school-record 35 wins.

On March 26, 2021, Purdue announced the 2021–2022 season will be the last year of the "Versyp Era" at Purdue, Gearlds joining the Boilermaker staff and then succeeding Sharon Versyp as the head coach in the spring of 2022. The Journal & Courier reported on August 18, 2021, that Purdue University was investigating allegations that Versyp created a "toxic and hostile environment," including verbally attacking players and bullying a member of her coaching staff. It was announced on September 16, 2021, that Versyp would be retiring and replaced by Gearlds a year earlier than originally planned.

== Head coaching record ==
Record table
Season	Team	Overall	Conference	Standing	Postseason
Marian Knights (Crossroads League) (2013–2021)
2013–14	Marian	16–16	8–10	5th	
2014–15	Marian	28–6	14–4	2nd	NAIA Division II First Round
2015–16	Marian	32–6	16–2	1st	NAIA Division II National Champions
2016–17	Marian	35–3	17–1	1st	NAIA Division II National Champions
2017–18	Marian	32–3	17–1	1st	NAIA Division II First Round
2018–19	Marian	27–7	16–2	1st	NAIA Division II First Round
2019–20	Marian	31–3	16–2	1st	Postseason canceled due to COVID-19
2020–21	Marian	27–6	16–0	1st	NAIA Division II Second Round
Marian:		227–49	120–22		
Purdue Boilermakers (Big Ten Conference) (2021–present)
2021–22	Purdue	17–15	7–11	T–9th	WNIT Second Round
2022–23	Purdue	19–11	9–8	7th	NCAA Division I First Four
2023–24	Purdue	15–19	5–13	T–11th	WNIT Great 8
2024–25	Purdue	10–19	3–15	T–15th	
2025–26	Purdue	13–17	5–13	T–14th	
Purdue:		74–81 (.477)	29–60 (.326)		
Total:		301–130 (.698)			
National champion Postseason invitational champion Conference regular season champion Conference regular season and conference tournament champion Division regular season champion Division regular season and conference tournament champion Conference tournament champion
