= Ewelina Kobryn =

Polish basketball player (born 1982)

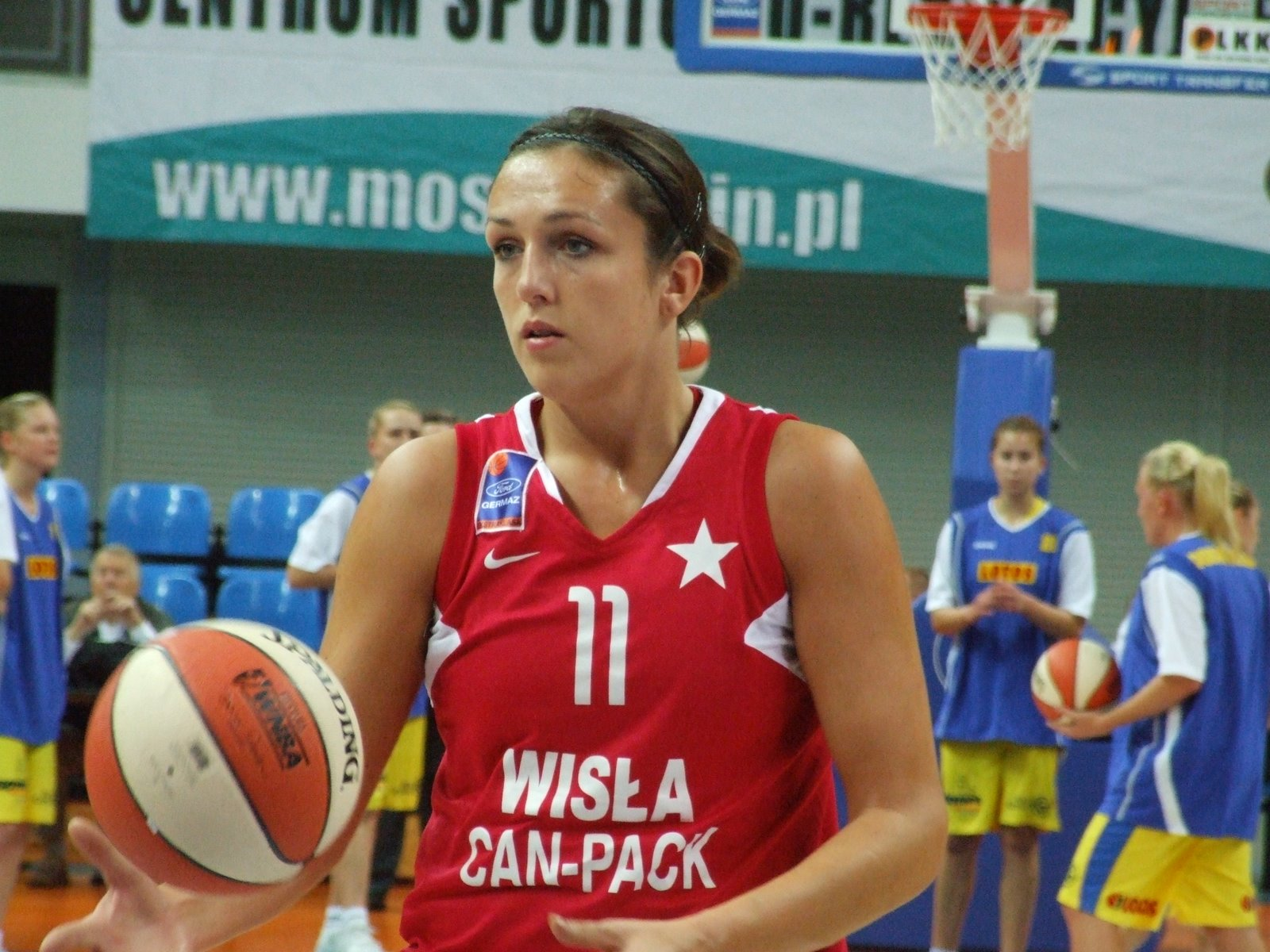

Personal information
- Born: 7 May 1982 (age 44) Tarnobrzeg, Poland
- Listed height: 6 ft 3 in (1.91 m)
- Listed weight: 190 lb (86 kg)

Career information
- Playing career: 2001–2018
- Position: Forward / center
- Number: 11,22,13

Career history
- 2001–2004: Wisła Kraków
- 2004–2007: Lotos Gdynia
- 2007–2012: Wisła Kraków
- 2011–2012: Seattle Storm
- 2012–2015: UMMC Ekaterinburg
- 2014–2015: Phoenix Mercury
- 2015–2016: Fenerbahçe Istanbul
- 2016: CB Avenida
- 2016–2017: Wisła Can-Pack Kraków
- 2017: Basket Lattes Montpellier Agglomération
- 2017–2018: Galatasaray

Career highlights
- WNBA champion (2014); Euroleague champion (2013); Polish champion (2005, 2008, 2011, 2012); Russian champion (2013, 2014, 2015); Polish Cup winner (2005, 2007, 2009, 2012); Russian Cup winner (2013, 2014)
- Stats at WNBA.com
- Stats at Basketball Reference

Ewelina Kobryn (born 7 May 1982) is a Polish professional women's basketball player who played for Fenerbahçe Istanbul.

== Career ==
So far she has been up nine times for the championship title. She started playing basketball at the age of 17.

== WNBA career ==
Kobryn was not drafted, but was signed by the Seattle Storm for the 2011 season. and also played for the Phoenix Mercury. She won WNBA championship in 2014 with Phoenix Mercury.

== Career statistics ==
Legend
GP	Games played	GS	Games started	MPG	Minutes per game	RPG	Rebounds per game
APG	Assists per game	SPG	Steals per game	BPG	Blocks per game	PPG	Points per game
TO	Turnovers per game	FG%	Field-goal percentage	3P%	3-point field-goal percentage	FT%	Free-throw percentage
**Bold**	Career best	°	League leader

†	Denotes season in which Kobryn won a WNBA championship

=== WNBA ===
==== Regular season ====
WNBA regular season statistics
Year	Team	GP	GS	MPG	FG%	3P%	FT%	RPG	APG	SPG	BPG	TO	PPG
2011	Seattle	18	0	6.8	.367	.286	.667	1.2	0.3	0.3	0.3	0.4	1.4
2012	Seattle	**33**	**6**	**13.3**	**.412**	**.370**	**.720**	**2.4**	**0.5**	**0.5**	**0.4**	1.2	**4.8**
2013	Did not appear in league												
2014 †	Phoenix	20	0	6.9	.286	.000	.611	1.1	0.2	0.3	0.1	**0.3**	1.6
**Career**	3 years, 2 teams	71	6	9.8	.383	.316	.690	1.7	0.3	0.4	0.3	0.8	3.0

==== Playoffs ====
WNBA playoff statistics
Year	Team	GP	GS	MPG	FG%	3P%	FT%	RPG	APG	SPG	BPG	TO	PPG
2011	Seattle	1	0	4.0	**1.000**	—	**.500**	1.0	0.0	0.0	0.0	**0.0**	3.0
2014 †	Phoenix	**5**	**1**	**9.4**	.667	.000	.333	**2.2**	0.0	**0.2**	**0.8**	0.2	**4.2**
**Career**	2 years, 2 teams	6	1	8.5	.688	.000	.400	2.0	0.0	0.2	0.7	0.2	4.0
