= 2009 Seattle Storm season =

- Head coach: Brian Agler
- Arena: KeyArena

Results
- Record: 20–14 (.588)
- Place: 2nd (Western)
- Playoff finish: Lost Western Conference Semifinals (2-1) to Los Angeles Sparks

Media
- Television: FSN Northwest

The 2009 WNBA season was the tenth season for the Seattle Storm of the Women's National Basketball Association.

== Offseason ==
=== Dispersal Draft ===
Based on the Storm's 2008 record, they would pick 12th in the Houston Comets dispersal draft. The Storm waived their pick.

=== WNBA draft ===
The following are the Storm's selections in the 2009 WNBA draft.

| Round | Pick | Player | Nationality | School/Team/Country |
|---|---|---|---|---|
| 1 | 12 | Ashley Walker | United States | California |
| 3 | 38 | Mara Freshour | United States | Florida State |

=== Transactions ===
- September 10: The Storm signed A'Quonesia Franklin to an end-of-regular season contract.
- September 9: The Storm signed La’Tangela Atkinson to an end-of-regular season contract.
- June 4: The Storm waived A'Quonesia Franklin and Aja Parham.
- May 31: The Storm waived La'Tangela Atkinson and Kasha Terry.
- May 22: The Storm waived Kimberly Beck and Mara Freshour.
- May 7: The Storm signed La’Tangela Atkinson, A’Quonesia Franklin and Aja Parham to training camp contacts.
- May 7: The Storm waived Mel Thomas.
- May 4: The Storm re-signed Lauren Jackson.
- April 23: The Storm announced that Kristen O'Neill declined her offer to attend training camp.
- March 20: The Storm waived Kelly Santos.
- March 19: The Storm signed Kasha Terry and Mel Thomas.
- February 23: The Storm signed Shannon Johnson.
- February 20: The Storm signed Suzy Batkovic.
- February 10: The Storm re-signed Ashley Robinson.
- February 9: The Storm re-signed Janell Burse.
- February 2: The Storm signed Kelly Santos to a training camp contract.
- January 31: The Storm waived Sheryl Swoopes.
- January 7: The Storm re-signed free agent Tanisha Wright and signed Kimberly Beck and Kristen O'Neill to training-camp contracts.
- June 22, 2008: The Storm traded their second round pick in the 2009 WNBA Draft to the Atlanta Dream as part of the Camille Little transaction.

| Date | Trade | |
|---|---|---|
| June 22, 2008 | To Seattle Storm | To Atlanta Dream |
| June 22, 2008 | Camille Little | second-round pick in the 2009 WNBA Draft |

=== Free agents ===
==== Additions ====
| Player | Signed | Former team |
| Tanisha Wright | January 7, 2009 | re-signed |
| Janell Burse | February 9, 2009 | re-signed |
| Ashley Robinson | February 10, 2009 | re-signed |
| Suzy Batkovic | February 20, 2009 | free agent |
| Shannon Johnson | February 23, 2009 | Houston Comets |
| Lauren Jackson | May 4, 2009 | re-signed |

==== Subtractions ====
| Player | Left | New team |
| Shyra Ely | January 12, 2009 | Chicago Sky |
| Sheryl Swoopes | January 31, 2009 | free agent |
| Yolanda Griffith | February 20, 2009 | Indiana Fever |
| Kelly Santos | March 20, 2009 | free agent |
| Kimberly Beck | May 22, 2009 | free agent |

== Roster ==
2009 Seattle Storm roster
Players
Coaches

| Pos. | No. | Nat. | Name | Height | Weight | From |
|---|---|---|---|---|---|---|
| C | 9 | (Australia) | Batkovic-Brown, Suzy | 6' 4" (1.93m) | 203 lb (92kg) | Australia |
| PG | 10 | (United States) | Bird, Sue | 5' 9" (1.75m) | 150 lb (68kg) | Connecticut |
| C | 33 | (United States) | Burse, Janell | 6' 5" (1.96m) | 199 lb (90kg) | Tulane |
| SF | 2 | (United States) | Cash, Swin | 6' 1" (1.85m) | 162 lb (73kg) | Connecticut |
| G/F | 4 | (United States) | Gearlds, Katie | 6' 1" (1.85m) | 184 lb (83kg) | Purdue |
| F/C | 15 | (Australia) | Jackson, Lauren | 6' 5" (1.96m) | 187 lb (85kg) | Australia |
| PG | 14 | (United States) | Johnson, Shannon | 5' 7" (1.7m) | 152 lb (69kg) | South Carolina |
| PF | 20 | (United States) | Little, Camille | 6' 2" (1.88m) | 180 lb (82kg) | North Carolina |
| C | 43 | (United States) | Robinson, Ashley | 6' 4" (1.93m) | 180 lb (82kg) | Tennessee |
| F | 44 | (United States) | Walker, Ashley | 6' 1" (1.85m) | 200 lb (91kg) | California |
| PG | 30 | (United States) | Wright, Tanisha | 5' 11" (1.8m) | 165 lb (75kg) | Penn State |

Head coach
(United States) Brian Agler (Wittenberg)
Assistant coaches
(United States) Shelley Patterson (Washington State)
(United States) Nancy Darsch (Springfield)
Athletic trainer
(United States) Tom Spencer

Legend

- (C) Team captain
- (DP) Unsigned draft pick
- (FA) Free agent
- (S) Suspended
- Injured

WNBA roster page

== Season standings ==
| Western Conference | W | L | PCT | GB | Home | Road | Conf. |
|---|---|---|---|---|---|---|---|
| Phoenix Mercury ^{x} | 23 | 11 | .676 | – | 12–5 | 11–6 | 13–7 |
| Seattle Storm ^{x} | 20 | 14 | .588 | 3.0 | 13–4 | 7–10 | 13–7 |
| Los Angeles Sparks ^{x} | 18 | 16 | .529 | 5.0 | 11–6 | 7–10 | 11–9 |
| San Antonio Silver Stars ^{x} | 15 | 19 | .441 | 8.0 | 10–7 | 5–12 | 10–10 |
| Minnesota Lynx ^{o} | 14 | 20 | .412 | 9.0 | 9–8 | 5–12 | 7–13 |
| Sacramento Monarchs ^{o} | 12 | 22 | .353 | 11.0 | 7–10 | 5–12 | 6–14 |

== Schedule ==
=== Preseason ===
2009 Game Log: Preseason

| Game | Date | Time (ET) | Opponent | Score | High points | High rebounds | High assists | Location/Attendance | Record |
|---|---|---|---|---|---|---|---|---|---|
| 1 | May 21 | 10:00pm | Sacramento | 64-55 | Little (13) | Little, Walker (5) | Atkinson (4) | KeyArena; 4,875 | 1-0 |
| 2 | May 30 | 10:00pm | @ Phoenix | 58-61 | Wright (16) | Walker (12) | Bird (4) | US Airways Center; 2,421 | 1-1 |

=== Regular season ===
2009 Game Log: Regular Season
June

| Game | Date | Time (ET) | Opponent | TV | Score | High points | High rebounds | High assists | Location/Attendance | Record |
|---|---|---|---|---|---|---|---|---|---|---|
| 1 | June 6 | 4:00pm | @ Sacramento | | 71-61 | Jackson (23) | Little (6) | Bird (8) | ARCO Arena; 14,824 | 1-0 |
| 2 | June 7 | 9:00pm | Sacramento | FSN-NW | 80-70 | Jackson (25) | Bird, Jackson, Little (5) | Bird (8) | KeyArena; 9,686 | 2-0 |
| 3 | June 9 | 7:00pm | @ Indiana | ESPN2 | 66-73 | Jackson (21) | Jackson, Little (6) | Bird (5) | Conseco Fieldhouse; 7,253 | 2-1 |
| 4 | June 12 | 8:00pm | @ Minnesota | | 88-71 | Jackson (22) | Jackson (11) | Bird (9) | Target Center; 6,423 | 3-1 |
| 5 | June 14 | 6:00pm | @ Chicago | | 57-64 | Jackson (22) | Jackson, Little (8) | Wright (4) | UIC Pavilion; 2,681 | 3-2 |
| 6 | June 19 | 10:00pm | Minnesota | | 90-62 | Jackson (26) | Jackson, Johnson (6) | Bird (10) | KeyArena; 7,607 | 4-2 |
| 7 | June 22 | 7:00pm | @ Phoenix | | 93-84 | Jackson (25) | Jackson (8) | Bird (9) | US Airways Center; 6,181 | 5-2 |
| 8 | June 26 | 10:00pm | Los Angeles | | 69-67 | Jackson (32) | Jackson, Wright (8) | Bird (5) | KeyArena; 9,686 | 6-2 |
| 9 | June 28 | 9:30pm | @ Los Angeles | NBA TV; FSNW | 55-83 | Jackson, Little (9) | Cash (8) | Johnson (3) | STAPLES Center; 10,797 | 6-3 |

July

| Game | Date | Time (ET) | Opponent | TV | Score | High points | High rebounds | High assists | Location/Attendance | Record |
|---|---|---|---|---|---|---|---|---|---|---|
| 10 | July 1 | 10:00pm | @ Phoenix | | 83-91 | Cash, Jackson (17) | Cash (9) | Wright (6) | US Airways Center; 6,341 | 6-4 |
| 11 | July 7 | 3:00pm | San Antonio | | 66-53 | Cash (18) | Cash, Jackson (12) | Bird (3) | KeyArena; 10,137 | 7-4 |
| 12 | July 9 | 9:00pm | Sacramento | ESPN2 | 66-55 | Cash (18) | Bird, Cash, Jackson, Wright (5) | Wright (7) | KeyArena; 6,838 | 8-4 |
| 13 | July 12 | 9:00pm | Chicago | NBA TV; FSN-NW | 81-86 | Jackson, Wright (18) | Jackson, Wright (7) | Wright (7) | KeyArena; 6,796 | 8-5 |
| 14 | July 15 | 10:00pm | Detroit | NBA TV; FSN-NW | 63-66 | Little (12) | Little (6) | Bird (6) | KeyArena; 6,821 | 8-6 |
| 15 | July 17 | 10:00pm | @ Sacramento | | 69-56 | Bird (20) | Little (9) | Bird (6) | ARCO Arena; 6,386 | 9-6 |
| 16 | July 19 | 8:00pm | Minnesota | FSN-NW | 72-69 | Little (18) | Cash (9) | Bird, Johnson, Wright (4) | KeyArena; 6,912 | 10-6 |
| 17 | July 22 | 10:00pm | Los Angeles | | 98-87 (3OT) | Bird (23) | Little (14) | Bird, Cash (5) | KeyArena; 7,154 | 11-6 |
| 18 | July 28 | 8:00pm | @ San Antonio | KMYS | 71-74 | Jackson (19) | Cash (11) | Bird (5) | AT&T Center; 5,382 | 11-7 |

August

| Game | Date | Time (ET) | Opponent | TV | Score | High points | High rebounds | High assists | Location/Attendance | Record |
|---|---|---|---|---|---|---|---|---|---|---|
| 19 | August 1 | 10:00pm | San Antonio | NBA TV; KMYS | 85-82 (OT) | Jackson (23) | Jackson (13) | Bird (5) | KeyArena; 8,167 | 12-7 |
| 20 | August 4 | 10:00pm | Phoenix | | 90-101 (OT) | Wright (25) | Cash, Jackson (11) | Wright (7) | KeyArena; 6,728 | 12-8 |
| 21 | August 6 | 10:30pm | @ Los Angeles | | 75-79 (OT) | Jackson (21) | Cash (8) | Bird, Wright (6) | STAPLES Center; 9,735 | 12-9 |
| 22 | August 8 | 10:00pm | New York | | 70-69 | Jackson (21) | Jackson (9) | Bird (6) | KeyArena; 7,496 | 13-9 |
| 23 | August 13 | 7:00pm | @ Connecticut | | 53-64 | Wright (13) | Jackson (10) | Bird (3) | Mohegan Sun Arena; 6,983 | 13-10 |
| 24 | August 15 | 7:00pm | @ Atlanta | | 79-88 | Jackson (25) | Jackson (9) | Bird (12) | Philips Arena; 8,751 | 13-11 |
| 25 | August 18 | 7:30pm | @ Detroit | | 79-75 | Jackson (36) | Cash, Jackson (7) | Bird (8) | Palace of Auburn Hills; 7,392 | 14-11 |
| 26 | August 22 | 10:00pm | Indiana | | 74-60 | Bird (16) | Cash (9) | Bird, Wright (5) | KeyArena; 8,273 | 15-11 |
| 27 | August 25 | 10:00pm | Washington | | 78-68 | Burse (14) | Little (7) | Wright (6) | KeyArena; 6,791 | 16-11 |
| 28 | August 27 | 10:00pm | Connecticut | | 86-74 | Bird (21) | Little (10) | Bird (7) | KeyArena; 5,688 | 17-11 |
| 29 | August 29 | 10:00pm | Atlanta | | 91-84 (2OT) | Wright (25) | Little (15) | Bird (8) | KeyArena; 9,089 | 18-11 |

September

| Game | Date | Time (ET) | Opponent | TV | Score | High points | High rebounds | High assists | Location/Attendance | Record |
|---|---|---|---|---|---|---|---|---|---|---|
| 30 | September 1 | 7:00pm | @ New York | | 65-58 | Little (17) | Little (13) | Wright (3) | Madison Square Garden; 8,469 | 19-11 |
| 31 | September 3 | 10:00pm | @ Washington | | 67-78 | Bird (17) | Cash (7) | Bird (6) | Verizon Center; 10,648 | 19-12 |
| 32 | September 5 | 10:00pm | @ Minnesota | NBA TV; FSN-N | 68-76 | Wright (20) | Little (8) | Johnson, Wright (4) | Target Center; 8,170 | 19-13 |
| 33 | September 10 | 10:00pm | Phoenix | | 84-92 (OT) | Wright (24) | Burse, Little (9) | Wright (5) | KeyArena; 9,089 | 19-14 |
| 34 | September 12 | 9:00pm | @ San Antonio | | 64-55 | Johnson (16) | Little (11) | Johnson (5) | AT&T Center; 10,153 | 20-14 |

All games are viewable on WNBA LiveAccess

=== Postseason ===
2009 Game Log: Postseason
Western Conference Semifinals

| Game | Date | Time (ET) | Opponent | TV | Score | High points | High rebounds | High assists | Location/Attendance | Series |
|---|---|---|---|---|---|---|---|---|---|---|
| 1 | September 16 | 10:00pm | @ Los Angeles | ESPN2 | 63-70 | Cash (24) | Batkovic-Brown (7) | Bird, Wright (5) | STAPLES Center; 7,919 | 0-1 |
| 2 | September 18 | 10:00pm | Los Angeles | NBA TV | 75-74 | Cash (18) | Wright (6) | Wright (9) | KeyArena; 8,854 | 1-1 |
| 3 | September 20 | 5:00pm | Los Angeles | ESPN2 | 64-75 | Cash (21) | Cash (10) | Cash (3) | KeyArena; 8,159 | 1-2 |

== Regular Season Statistics ==
Legend
| GP | Games played | GS | Games started | MPG | Minutes per game | RPG | Rebounds per game |
| APG | Assists per game | SPG | Steals per game | BPG | Blocks per game | PPG | Points per game |
| FG% | Field-goal percentage | 3P% | 3-point field-goal percentage | FT% | Free-throw percentage | TO | Turnovers per game |
| PF | Fouls per game | | Team leader | | League leader |

=== Player statistics ===
| Player | GP | GS | MPG | RPG | APG | SPG | BPG | PPG |
|---|---|---|---|---|---|---|---|---|
| La'Tangela Atkinson | 0 | 0 | 00.0 | 0.0 | 0.0 | 0.00 | 0.00 | 0.0 |
| Suzy Batkovic | 0 | 0 | 00.0 | 0.0 | 0.0 | 0.00 | 0.00 | 0.0 |
| Sue Bird | 0 | 0 | 00.0 | 0.0 | 0.0 | 0.00 | 0.00 | 0.0 |
| Janell Burse | 0 | 0 | 00.0 | 0.0 | 0.0 | 0.00 | 0.00 | 0.0 |
| Swin Cash | 0 | 0 | 00.0 | 0.0 | 0.0 | 0.00 | 0.00 | 0.0 |
| Katie Gearlds | 0 | 0 | 00.0 | 0.0 | 0.0 | 0.00 | 0.00 | 0.0 |
| A'Quonesia Franklin | 0 | 0 | 00.0 | 0.0 | 0.0 | 0.00 | 0.00 | 0.0 |
| Lauren Jackson | 0 | 0 | 00.0 | 0.0 | 0.0 | 0.00 | 0.00 | 0.0 |
| Shannon Johnson | 0 | 0 | 00.0 | 0.0 | 0.0 | 0.00 | 0.00 | 0.0 |
| Camille Little | 0 | 0 | 00.0 | 0.0 | 0.0 | 0.00 | 0.00 | 0.0 |
| Ashley Robinson | 0 | 0 | 00.0 | 0.0 | 0.0 | 0.00 | 0.00 | 0.0 |
| Ashley Walker | 0 | 0 | 00.0 | 0.0 | 0.0 | 0.00 | 0.00 | 0.0 |
| Tanisha Wright | 0 | 0 | 00.0 | 0.0 | 0.0 | 0.00 | 0.00 | 0.0 |

=== Team statistics ===
| Team | FG% | 3P% | FT% | RPG | APG | SPG | BPG | TO | PF | PPG |
|---|---|---|---|---|---|---|---|---|---|---|
| Seattle Storm | .000 | .000 | .000 | 00.0 | 00.0 | 0.0 | 0.0 | 00.0 | 00.0 | 00.0 |
| Opponents | .000 | .000 | .000 | 00.0 | 00.0 | 0.0 | 0.0 | 00.0 | 00.0 | 00.0 |

== Awards and honors ==
- Lauren Jackson was named WNBA Western Conference Player of the Week for the week of June 22, 2009.
- Sue Bird was named WNBA Western Conference Player of the Week for the week of July 20, 2009.
- Sue Bird was named WNBA Western Conference Player of the Week for the week of August 24, 2009.
- Sue Bird was named to the 2009 WNBA All-Star Team as a Western Conference starter.
- Swin Cash was named to the 2009 WNBA All-Star Team as a Western Conference starter.
- Lauren Jackson was named to the 2009 WNBA All-Star Team as a Western Conference starter.
- Lauren Jackson was named to the All-WNBA First Team.
- Lauren Jackson was named to the All-Defensive First Team.
- Tanisha Wright was named to the All-Defensive First Team.
