= List of WNBA regular season records =

This article lists all-time records achieved in the WNBA regular season in major statistical categories recognized by the league, including those set by teams and individuals in a game, season, and career.

== Individual game records ==
=== Points ===
Stats current through the 2026 season

- Most points, game

- 53 – Liz Cambage, Dallas vs. New York, July 17, 2018 (regulation)
- 53 – A'ja Wilson, Las Vegas vs. Atlanta, August 22, 2023 (regulation)
- 53 – Marina Mabrey, Toronto vs. Los Angeles, June 25, 2026 (regulation)
- 51 – Riquna Williams, Tulsa at San Antonio, September 8, 2013 (regulation)
- 48 – Maya Moore, Minnesota vs. Atlanta, July 22, 2014 (2OT)

- Most points in a half, game

- 35 – Riquna Williams, Tulsa at San Antonio, September 8, 2013
- 32 – Diana Taurasi, Phoenix vs. Atlanta, August 3, 2023
- 31 – Cynthia Cooper, Houston at Sacramento, July 25, 1997
- 31 – Maya Moore, Minnesota at Connecticut, July 7, 2016
- 31 – A'ja Wilson, Las Vegas at Atlanta, August 22, 2023

- Most points in a quarter, game

- 22 – Diana Taurasi, Phoenix vs. Los Angeles, July 14, 2006
- 22 – Brittney Sykes, Atlanta at Phoenix, July 7, 2019
- 22 – Jewell Loyd, Seattle vs. Phoenix, September 17, 2021

- Most points, overtime period

- 12 – Mwadi Mabika, Los Angeles vs. San Antonio, July 2, 2004
- 12 – Sheryl Swoopes, Houston vs. Indiana, May 29, 2005
- 12 – Deanna Nolan, Detroit vs. New York, June 3, 2005
- 12 – Becky Hammon, San Antonio vs. Detroit, August 29, 2009

- Most points by a reserve, game

- 38 – DeWanna Bonner, Phoenix vs. Dallas, June 18, 2016 (3OT)
- 36 – Angel McCoughtry, Atlanta at Connecticut, July 31, 2011
- 34 – Angel McCoughtry, Atlanta vs. San Antonio, August 20, 2009
- 34 – Kia Nurse, New York at Indiana, June 2, 2018

- Most points in a triple-double game

- 31 – Sabrina Ionescu, New York at Las Vegas, July 7, 2022
- 28 – Natasha Howard, Dallas vs. Chicago, August 4, 2023
- 27 – Sabrina Ionescu, New York vs. Chicago, June 12, 2022
- 27 – Alyssa Thomas, Connecticut vs. Los Angeles, September 5, 2023

=== Field goals ===
Stats current through the 2026 season

- Most field goals made, game

- 18 – Lauren Jackson, Seattle at Washington, July 24, 2007 (OT)
- 17 – multiple players

- Most field goals missed in a half, game

- 11 – Linda Burgess, Sacramento vs. Utah, August 15, 1998
- 11 – Lauren Jackson, Seattle vs. Los Angeles, August 6, 2003
- 11 – Sheryl Swoopes, Houston at Seattle, August 9, 2005
- 11 – Lisa Leslie, Los Angeles vs. San Antonio, June 25, 2006

- Most field goals missed in a quarter, game

- 9 – Sylvia Fowles, Chicago at Phoenix, August 1, 2010
- 8 – Betty Lennox, Atlanta vs. Minnesota, June 3, 2008
- 8 – Deanna Nolan, Detroit at Washington, July 18, 2008
- 8 – Marina Mabrey, Toronto at Connecticut, June 20, 2026

- Highest field goal percentage, game (min. 10 field goals made)

- 1.000 (12 FG made) – Nneka Ogwumike, Los Angeles at Dallas, June 11, 2016
- 1.000 (11 FG made) – Seimone Augustus, Minnesota at Los Angeles, June 8, 2007
- 0.929 (13 FG made) – Nneka Ogwumike, Los Angeles vs. Atlanta, June 30, 2016
- 0.923 (12 FG made) – 3 additional occurrences by 2 additional players

- Most field goal attempts, game

- 35 – Jewell Loyd, Seattle vs. Minnesota, June 29, 2023 (OT)
- 33 – Diana Taurasi, Phoenix at Houston, August 10, 2006 (3OT)
- 33 – Diana Taurasi, Phoenix at Seattle, July 14, 2010 (3OT)
- 33 – Angel McCoughtry, Atlanta at Connecticut, June 23, 2013
- 32 – Betty Lennox, Atlanta at Connecticut, June 27, 2008 (OT)

- Most field goal attempts in a half, game

- 20 – Wendy Palmer, Utah vs. Los Angeles, August 16, 1997
- 19 – Sheryl Swoopes, Houston at Los Angeles, August 20, 1999
- 19 – Chamique Holdsclaw, Washington vs. Los Angeles, June 26, 2000

- Most field goal attempts in a quarter, game

- 12 – Sylvia Fowles, Chicago at Phoenix, August 1, 2010

- Most field goals made, none missed, game

- 13 – Kamilla Cardoso, Chicago vs. Portland, June 26, 2026
- 12 – Nneka Ogwumike, Los Angeles at Dallas, June 11, 2016
- 11 – Seimone Augustus, Minnesota at Los Angeles, June 8, 2007
- 9 – Michelle Snow, Houston vs. Indiana, May 29, 2005 (2OT)
- 9 – Ann Wauters, San Antonio vs. Sacramento, September 13, 2008
- 9 – Candice Dupree, Phoenix vs. Tulsa, June 12, 2010

- Most field goal attempts, none made, game

- 12 – Tina Thompson, Houston at Phoenix, July 19, 1999
- 12 – Tangela Smith, Phoenix at Washington, June 13, 2007
- 12 – Jackie Young, Las Vegas at Atlanta, May 17, 2026
- 11 – Kamila Vodičková, Seattle vs. Portland, August 9, 2002
- 11 – Slobodanka Tuvic, Phoenix at Seattle, July 25, 2003
- 11 – Elena Baranova, New York vs. Detroit, August 1, 2003
- 11 – Monique Currie, Charlotte at New York, June 27, 2006

- Most 3-point field goals, none missed, game

- 6 – Tamika Catchings, Indiana at Orlando, July 3, 2002 (OT)
- 6 – Maya Moore, Minnesota at Phoenix, August 9, 2011
- 6 – Kristi Toliver, Los Angeles vs. Minnesota, July 5, 2012
- 6 – Stefanie Dolson, Washington vs. Minnesota, August 17, 2024
- 6 – Paige Bueckers, Dallas vs. Seattle, August 23, 2026

- Most 3-point field goal attempts, none made, game

- 8 – Tina Thompson, Houston at Utah, June 30, 1998 (2OT)
- 8 – Crystal Robinson, New York vs. Detroit, June 21, 2000
- 8 – Crystal Robinson, New York vs. Cleveland, August 4, 2001
- 8 – 6 additional players

- Most 3-point field goals made, game

- 10 – Kayla McBride, Minnesota vs Dallas, August 9, 2026
- 9 – Kelsey Mitchell, Indiana vs. Connecticut, September 8, 2019
- 9 – Jewell Loyd, Seattle at Washington, July 11, 2023
- 9 – Arike Ogunbowale, Dallas vs. Indiana, September 1, 2024
- 9 – Rhyne Howard, Atlanta vs. Chicago, June 13, 2025
- 9 – Rhyne Howard, Atlanta vs. Los Angeles, September 5, 2025
- 9 – Chelsea Gray, Las Vegas vs. Portland, June 11, 2026
- 9 – Marina Mabrey, Toronto at Connecticut, June 19, 2026
- 9 – Marina Mabrey, Toronto vs. Los Angeles, June 25, 2026
- 8 – multiple players

- Most 3-point field goals made in a half, game

- 8 – Rhyne Howard, Atlanta vs. Chicago, June 13, 2025
- 8 – Kayla McBride, Minnesota at Las Vegas, August 2, 2025
- 7 – Renee Montgomery, Atlanta at New York, August 12, 2018
- 7 – Rhyne Howard, Atlanta vs. Los Angeles, September 5, 2025
- 6 – Sue Bird, Seattle at Detroit, August 8, 2006
- 6 – Diana Taurasi, Phoenix at Tulsa, May 25, 2010
- 6 – Diana Taurasi, Phoenix at Seattle, September 9, 2011
- 6 – Sami Whitcomb, New York at Seattle, May 26 2017
- 6 – Sami Whitcomb, Atlanta at Seattle, August 12, 2020
- 6 – Arike Ogunbowale, Dallas vs. Indiana, September 1, 2024
- 6 – Caitlin Clark, Indiana vs. New York, June 14, 2025
- 6 – Azzi Fudd, Dallas at New York, May 24, 2026

- Most 3-point field goals made in a quarter, game

- 5 – Diana Taurasi, Phoenix at Tulsa, May 25, 2010
- 5 – Maya Moore, Minnesota vs. Indiana, September 17, 2012
- 5 – Maya Moore, Minnesota vs. Los Angeles, June 24, 2016
- 5 – Sami Whitcomb, Atlanta at Seattle, August 12, 2020
- 5 – Sami Whitcomb, New York vs. Las Vegas, July 12, 2022
- 5 – Arike Ogunbowale, Dallas vs. Indiana, September, 1, 2024
- 5 – Rhyne Howard, Atlanta vs. Chicago, June 13, 2025
- 5 – Sami Whitcomb, Phoenix vs. Chicago, June 21, 2025
- 5 – Rhyne Howard, Atlanta vs. Los Angeles, September 5, 2025
- 5 – Caitlin Clark, Indiana vs. Washington, May 15, 2026
- 5 — Azzi Fudd, Dallas at New York, May 24, 2026
- 5 — Marina Mabrey, Toronto at Connecticut, June 20, 2026

- Most 3-point attempts, game

- 19 – Kristi Toliver, Washington vs. Atlanta, July 19, 2017 (OT)
- 19 – Rhyne Howard, Atlanta vs. Chicago, June 13, 2025
- 17 – Diana Taurasi, Phoenix at Seattle, June 23, 2017
- 17 – Diana Taurasi, Phoenix at Minnesota, July 12, 2022 (2OT)
- 17 – Rhyne Howard, Atlanta vs. Dallas, September 6, 2024 (OT)
- 17 – Rhyne Howard, Atlanta vs. Los Angeles, September 5, 2025
- 17 – Caitlin Clark, Indiana vs. Washington, May 15, 2026 (OT)
- 16 – Diana Taurasi, Phoenix vs. Seattle, May 20, 2016
- 16 – Jewell Loyd, Seattle at Washington, July 11, 2023
- 16 – Arike Ogunbowale, Dallas at Chicago, June 20, 2024
- 16 – Arike Ogunbowale, Dallas vs. Indiana, September 1, 2024

- Most 3-point attempts in a half, game

- 12 – Shanna Zolman, San Antonio at Minnesota, August 19, 2007
- 12 – Rhyne Howard, Atlanta vs. Chicago, June 13, 2025
- 11 – Belinda Snell, Phoenix vs. Houston, June 24, 2007
- 10 – Cynthia Cooper, Houston vs. Cleveland, July 29, 1997
- 10 – Diana Taurasi, Phoenix at San Antonio, August 2, 2007
- 10 – Renee Montgomery, Connecticut vs. Los Angeles, July 24, 2010
- 10 – Rhyne Howard, Atlanta vs. Los Angeles, September 5, 2025

- Most 3-point attempts in a quarter, game

- 9 – Amber Jacobs, Minnesota vs. Phoenix, July 3, 2007
- 8 – Shanna Zolman, San Antonio vs. Phoenix, August 2, 2007
- 8 – Rhyne Howard, Atlanta vs. Chicago, June 13, 2025
- 8 – Sami Whitcomb, Phoenix vs. Chicago, June 21, 2025
- 8 – Rhyne Howard, Atlanta vs. Los Angeles, September 5, 2025

=== Free throws ===
- Most free throws made, none missed, game

- 19 – Elena Delle Donne, Chicago at Atlanta, June 24, 2015
- 17 – Angel McCoughtry, Atlanta at Chicago, June 2, 2012
- 16 – Elena Delle Donne, Chicago vs. Los Angeles, June 6, 2014

- Most free throw attempts, none made, game

- 8 – Cheryl Ford, Detroit at Charlotte, August 6, 2005 (OT)
- 7 – Nakia Sanford, Washington vs. Atlanta, June 20, 2008
- 6 – several

- Most free throws made, game

- 22 – Cynthia Cooper, Houston vs. Sacramento, July 3, 1998
- 19 – Tina Charles, Connecticut vs. Phoenix, June 29, 2013
- 18 – Katie Smith, Minnesota at Los Angeles, July 8, 2001 (OT)

- Most free throws made in a half, game

- 15 – Diana Taurasi, Phoenix vs. Houston, September 7, 2008
- 14 – Tina Thompson, Houston vs. Sacramento, June 11, 2007

- Most free throws made in a quarter, game

- 11 – Shavonte Zellous, Detroit at Atlanta, June 26, 2009
- 10 – Tina Thompson, Houston vs. Sacramento, June 11, 2007
- 10 – Nakia Sanford, Washington at Houston, June 22, 2007

- Most free throw attempts, game

- 24 – Cynthia Cooper, Houston vs. Sacramento, July 3, 1998
- 24 – Tina Charles, Phoenix vs. Connecticut, June 29, 2013
- 21 – Swin Cash, Detroit vs. Miami, June 28, 2002 (OT)

- Most free throw attempts in a half, game

- 16 – Lisa Leslie, Los Angeles at New York, June 25, 2000
- 16 – Kayte Christensen, Phoenix vs. San Antonio, August 22, 2003
- 16 – Izi Castro Marques, Atlanta vs. Los Angeles, June 27, 2010

- Most free throw attempts in a quarter, game

- 13 – Shavonte Zellous, Detroit at Atlanta, June 26, 2009
- 12 – Izi Castro Marques, Atlanta vs. Los Angeles, June 27, 2010
- 11 – Shavonte Zellous, Detroit at Washington, August 11, 2009

=== Rebounds ===
Stats current through the 2026 season

- Most rebounds, game

- 26 – Angel Reese, Atlanta at Los Angeles, August 24, 2026
- 24 – Chamique Holdsclaw, Washington at Charlotte, May 23, 2003
- 23 – Michelle Snow, Houston at Minnesota, August 4, 2006
- 23 – Tina Charles, Connecticut vs. Phoenix, June 25, 2010
- 23 – Tina Charles, Connecticut vs. Los Angeles, June 28, 2011

- Most rebounds in a half, game

- 16 – Janell Burse, Seattle vs. Phoenix, May 23, 2007
- 15 – Lisa Leslie, Los Angeles vs. New York, June 19, 1998
- 15 – Latasha Byears, Los Angeles vs. Houston, August 11, 2001
- 15 – Michelle Snow, Houston at Minnesota, August 4, 2006
- 15 – Sancho Lyttle, Houston vs. Minnesota, July 17, 2008
- 15 – Tina Charles, Connecticut at New York, June 27, 2010

- Most rebounds in a quarter, game

- 11 – Erika de Souza, Atlanta vs. Detroit, May 23, 2008
- 10 – Janell Burse, Seattle vs. Phoenix, May 23, 2007

- Most offensive rebounds, game

- 12 – Nneka Ogwumike, Los Angeles at Indiana, July 12, 2012
- 12 – Sancho Lyttle, Seattle at Atlanta, August 10, 2010
- 12 – Cheryl Ford, Detroit at San Antonio, May 22, 2004

- Most offensive rebounds in a half, game

- 10 – Sancho Lyttle, Atlanta vs. Seattle, August 10, 2010
- 9 – Nneka Ogwumike Los Angeles at Indiana, July 12, 2012
- 9 – Chasity Melvin, Chicago vs. Phoenix, June 26, 2008

- Most offensive rebounds in a quarter, game

- 6 – Deanna Jackson, Chicago at Indiana, June 21, 2006
- 6 – Taj McWilliams-Franklin, Connecticut at Indiana, August 9, 2006
- 6 – Sophia Young, San Antonio vs. Houston, July 27, 2007
- 6 – Erika de Souza, Atlanta vs. Detroit, May 23, 2008
- 6 – Sancho Lyttle, Atlanta vs. Seattle, August 10, 2010

- Most defensive rebounds, game

- 21 – Amanda Zahui B., New York vs. Las Vegas, August 29, 2020
- 18 – Cindy Brown, Detroit at Utah, August 10, 1998
- 18 – Angel Reese, Atlanta at Los Angeles, August 24, 2026
- 17 – Chamique Holdsclaw, Washington at Charlotte, May 23, 2003
- 17 – Cheryl Ford, Detroit at Connecticut, June 22, 2003 (OT)
- 17 – Elena Baranova, New York at Connecticut, August 20, 2005
- 17 – Tina Charles, Connecticut at Atlanta, July 7, 2010 (OT)

- Most defensive rebounds in a half, game

- 13 – Amanda Zahui B., New York vs. Las Vegas, August 29, 2020
- 12 – Sylvia Fowles, Chicago vs. Indiana, July 6, 2010
- 11 – Tari Phillips, New York at Houston, July 26, 2003
- 11 – Janell Burse, Seattle vs. Phoenix, May 23, 2007
- 11 – Angel Reese, Atlanta at Los Angeles, August 24, 2026

- Most defensive rebounds in a quarter, game

- 9 – Lisa Leslie, Los Angeles at Charlotte, May 23, 2006
- 9 – Sylvia Fowles, Chicago vs. Indiana, July 6, 2010
- 8 – Tina Charles, Connecticut at Atlanta, July 7, 2010

=== Assists ===
Stats current through the 2026 season

- Most assists, game

- 19 – Caitlin Clark, Indiana at Dallas, July 17, 2024
- 18 – Courtney Vandersloot, Chicago at Indiana, August 31, 2020
- 16 – Alyssa Thomas, Golden State and Phoenix, August 22, 2025
- 16 – Alyssa Thomas, Connecticut at Minnesota, June 1, 2023
- 16 – Sue Bird, Seattle at Las Vegas, October 2, 2020
- 16 - Sabrina Ionescu, New York vs. Phoenix, July 31, 2022
- 16 – Courtney Vandersloot, Chicago vs. New York, May 23, 2021
- 16 – Ticha Penicheiro, Sacramento at Cleveland, July 29, 1998
- 16 – Ticha Penicheiro, Sacramento vs. Los Angeles, August 3, 2002

- Most assists in a half, game

- 11 – Ticha Penicheiro, Sacramento at Cleveland, July 29, 1998
- 11 – Ticha Penicheiro, Sacramento at Utah, June 26, 2000
- 11 – Ticha Penicheiro, Sacramento vs. Los Angeles, August 3, 2002
- 11 – Caitlin Clark, Indiana at Dallas, July 17, 2024

- Most assists in a quarter, game

- 8 – Lindsay Whalen, Minnesota vs. Connecticut, August 3, 2010
- 8 – Caitlin Clark, Indiana at Dallas, July 17, 2024
- 7 – Shannon Johnson, San Antonio at Los Angeles, July 3, 2006
- 7 – Nikki Teasley, Washington at San Antonio, July 21, 2006
- 7 – Sue Bird, Seattle at Chicago, June 12, 2007
- 7 – Loree Moore, New York at Washington, July 18, 2009
- 7 – Ticha Penicheiro, Sacramento at Los Angeles, August 14, 2009
- 7 – Ticha Penicheiro, Sacramento at Atlanta, August 25, 2009
- 7 – Temeka Johnson, Phoenix at Atlanta, June 29, 2010
- 7 – Caitlin Clark, Indiana vs. Phoenix, July 12, 2024

- Most assists, no turnovers, game

- 14 – Julie Allemand, Toronto vs. Los Angeles, June 26, 2026
- 14 – Leïla Lacan, Connecticut vs. Indiana, August 17, 2025
- 14 – Jennifer Rizzotti, Cleveland vs. New York, June 21, 2002
- 12 – Michelle Cleary, Phoenix vs. Utah, July 19, 2000
- 12 – Ticha Penicheiro, Sacramento at Washington, June 23, 2000

=== Steals ===
Stats current through the 2026 season

- Most steals, game

- 10 – Ticha Penicheiro, Sacramento vs. San Antonio, July 10, 2003
- 9 – Michelle Griffiths, Phoenix at Utah, July 27, 1998
- 9 – Tamika Catchings, Indiana vs. Minnesota, July 26, 2002

- Most steals in a half, game

- 7 – Cynthia Cooper, Houston at Charlotte, August 11, 1997
- 7 – Michelle Brogan, Phoenix at Utah, July 27, 1998
- 7 – Tamika Catchings, Indiana vs. Houston, June 6, 2007
- 7 – Edwige Lawson-Wade, San Antonio vs. Tulsa, June 11, 2010

- Most steals in a quarter, game

- 5 – by many

=== Blocks ===
Stats current through the 2026 season

- Most blocks, game

- 11 – Brittney Griner, Phoenix at Tulsa, June 29, 2014
- 10 – Margo Dydek, Utah vs. Orlando, June 7, 2001
- 10 – Lisa Leslie, Los Angeles vs. Detroit, September 9, 2004

- Most blocks in a half, game

- 7 – Lisa Leslie, Los Angeles vs. Detroit, September 9, 2004
- 7 – Margo Dydek, Connecticut vs. San Antonio, June 4, 2005

=== Other ===
- Most turnovers, game

- 14 – Kristi Toliver, Tulsa vs. Los Angeles, May 29, 2012
- 11 – Michelle Edwards, Cleveland vs. Sacramento, August 2, 1997
- 11 – Chamique Holdsclaw, Washington vs. Utah, July 8, 1999
- 11 – Diana Taurasi, Phoenix vs. New York, July 3, 2010
- 11 – Betty Lennox, Minnesota at Houston, August 9, 2010
- 11 – Crystal Langhorne, Washington vs. Tulsa, June 26, 2011
- 11 – Angel McCoughtry, Atlanta at Tulsa, July 31, 2014

- Most personal fouls, game

- 6 – by many

- Most personal fouls in a half, game

- 6 – by many

- Most personal fouls in a quarter, game

- 6 – DiJonai Carrington, Dallas at Las Vegas, June 13, 2025
- 5 – by many

- Fewest minutes before disqualification, game

- 3 – DiJonai Carrington, Indiana at Chicago, August 8, 2026
- 5 – Sharon Manning, Miami at Detroit, July 26, 2000
- 7 – Rushia Brown, Cleveland vs. Utah, July 24, 1999
- 8 – Asjha Jones, Washington at Portland, June 28, 2002
- 8 – LaTonya Johnson, Utah vs. Los Angeles, August 9, 2002
- 8 – Vanessa Hayden, Minnesota vs. Los Angeles, May 31, 2006

== Individual season records ==
=== Points ===
Stats current through the 2026 season

- Most points, season

- 1,086 – Kelsey Mitchell, Indiana 2026
- 1,073 – A'ja Wilson, Las Vegas 2026
- 1,021 – A'ja Wilson, Las Vegas 2024

- Highest points per game average, season

- 26.87 - A'ja Wilson, Las Vegas 2024
- 26.17 - A'ja Wilson, Las Vegas 2026
- 25.29 – Diana Taurasi, Phoenix 2006

- Highest points per game average by a reserve, season (min. 20 bench appearances)

- 15.8 – Candice Wiggins, Minnesota 2008
- 15.0 – Chamique Holdsclaw, Los Angeles 2006
- 12.8 – Angel McCoughtry, Atlanta 2009

=== Field goals ===
Stats current through the 2026 season

- Highest field goal percentage, season

- .6824 – Ruthy Hebard, Chicago 2020
- .6684 – Tamika Williams, Minnesota 2003
- .6649 – Nneka Ogwumike, Los Angeles 2016

- Highest 3-point field goal percentage, season (min. 50 attempts)

- .5313 – Temeka Johnson, Tulsa 2012
- .5224 – Alysha Clark, Seattle 2020
- .5172 – Jennifer Azzi, Detroit 1999

- Most field goals made, season

- 385 – A'ja Wilson, Las Vegas 2024
- 381 – Kelsey Mitchell, Indiana 2026
- 378 – A'ja Wilson, Las Vegas 2026

- Most field goal attempts, season

- 770 – Jewell Loyd, Seattle 2023
- 752 – Arike Ogunbowale, Dallas 2023
- 748 – Kelsey Mitchell, Indiana 2026

- Most 3-point field goals made, season

- 135 – Kelsey Mitchell, Indiana 2026
- 134 – Rhyne Howard, Atlanta 2026
- 128 – Sabrina Ionescu, New York 2023
- 126 – Kayla McBride, Minnesota 2026

- Most 3-point attempts, season

- 377 – Rhyne Howard, Atlanta 2026
- 355 – Caitlin Clark, Indiana 2024
- 341 – Arike Ogunbowale, Dallas 2023

=== Free throws ===
Stats current through the 2026 season

- Highest free-throw percentage, season

- 1.000 – Becky Hammon, San Antonio 2014 (35 attempts)
- 1.000 – Veronica Burton, Dallas 2022 (32 attempts)
- .9841 – Eva Nemcova, Cleveland 1999

- Most free throws made, season

- 275 – A'ja Wilson, Las Vegas 2026
- 254 – Jewell Loyd, Seattle 2023
- 248 – A'ja Wilson, Las Vegas 2025

- Most free throw attempts, season

- 318 – A'ja Wilson, Las Vegas 2026
- 290 – A'ja Wilson, Las Vegas 2025
- 290 – Breanna Stewart, New York 2026

=== Rebounds ===
Stats current through the 2026 season

- Most rebounds, season

- 521 – Angel Reese, Atlanta 2026
- 456 – Jessica Shepard, Dallas 2026
- 451 – A'ja Wilson, Las Vegas 2024
- 446 – Angel Reese, Chicago 2024

- Highest rebounds per game average, season

- 13.12 – Angel Reese, Chicago 2024
- 12.57 – Angel Reese, Chicago 2025
- 12.12 – Angel Reese, Chicago 2026

- Most offensive rebounds, season

- 206 – Angel Reese, Atlanta 2026
- 172 – Angel Reese, Chicago 2024
- 162 – Yolanda Griffith, Sacramento 2001

- Most defensive rebounds, season

- 372 – A'ja Wilson, Las Vegas 2024
- 339 – Jessica Shepard, Dallas 2026
- 316 – A'ja Wilson, Las Vegas 2025
- 315 – Angel Reese, Atlanta 2026
- 314 – Alyssa Thomas, Connecticut 2023

=== Assists ===
Stats current through the 2026 season

- Most assists, season

- 358 – Alyssa Thomas, Phoenix 2026
- 357 – Alyssa Thomas, Phoenix 2025
- 337 – Caitlin Clark, Indiana 2024
- 333 – Caitlin Clark, Indiana 2026
- 317 – Alyssa Thomas, Phoenix 2024

- Highest assists per game average, season

- 10.00 – Courtney Vandersloot, Chicago 2020
- 9.15 – Alyssa Thomas, Phoenix 2025
- 9.09 – Courtney Vandersloot, Chicago 2019
- 8.60 – Courtney Vandersloot, Chicago 2018

=== Steals ===
Stats current through the 2026 season

- Most steals, season

- 100 – Teresa Weatherspoon, New York 1998
- 100 – Rhyne Howard, Atlanta 2026
- 99 – Tamika Catchings, Indiana 2009
- 99 – Gabby Williams, Seattle 2025
- 94 – Tamika Catchings, Indiana 2002

- Highest steals per game average, season

- 3.33 – Teresa Weatherspoon, New York 1998
- 3.14 – Tamika Catchings, Indiana 2007
- 3.04 – Teresa Weatherspoon, New York 1997

=== Blocks ===
Stats current through end of the 2026 season

- Most blocks, season

- 129 – Brittney Griner, Phoenix 2014
- 114 – Margo Dydek, Utah 1998
- 113 – Margo Dydek, Utah 2001

- Highest blocks per game average, season

- 4.04 – Brittney Griner, Phoenix 2015
- 3.80 – Margo Dydek, Utah 1998
- 3.79 – Brittney Griner, Phoenix 2014

=== Other ===
- 50–40–90 season

- 1 – Elena Delle Donne, Washington 2019
- 1 – Napheesa Collier, Minnesota 2025

- Most double-doubles, season

- 32 – Angel Reese, Atlanta 2026
- 28 – Alyssa Thomas, Connecticut 2023
- 26 – Angel Reese, Chicago 2024

- Most points/assists double-doubles, season

- 12 – Caitlin Clark, Indiana 2024
- 11 – Courtney Vandersloot, Chicago 2017
- 11 – Alyssa Thomas, Connecticut 2023

- Most consecutive points/rebounds double-doubles, single season

- 15 – Angel Reese, Chicago 2024

- Most consecutive points/assists double-doubles (single season)

- 6 – Courtney Vandersloot, Chicago 2017
- 5 – Caitlin Clark, Indiana 2024

- Most consecutive double-doubles (across multiple seasons)

- 15 – Angel Reese, Chicago 2024 (points and rebounds)
- 12 – Candace Parker, Los Angeles 2009–10 (points and rebounds)

- Most turnovers, season

- 223 – Caitlin Clark, Indiana 2024
- 183 – Caitlin Clark, Indiana 2026
- 147 – Alyssa Thomas, Phoenix 2026
- 145 – Alyssa Thomas, Connecticut 2024

- Most personal fouls, season

- 160 – Angel Reese, Atlanta 2026
- 154 – Kamilla Cardoso, Chicago 2026
- 149 – Natasha Howard, Minnesota 2026
- 145 – Laura Juškaitė, Toronto 2026

- Most disqualifications, season

- 7 – Isabelle Fijalkowski, Cleveland 1997
- 7 – Lisa Leslie, Los Angeles 2000
- 7 – Lisa Leslie, Los Angeles 2002

- Highest Win Shares, season

- 10.86 by A'ja Wilson, 2024
- 10.36 by A'ja Wilson, 2023
- 10.30 by Breanna Stewart, 2023

== Individual career records ==
Stats current through the 2026 season

- Most games played, career

- 580 – Sue Bird, Seattle 2002–22 (did not play in 2013 and 2019)
- 577 – DeWanna Bonner, Phoenix 2009–19, 2025–2026; Connecticut 2020–24, Indiana 2025, Atlanta 2026–present
- 565 – Diana Taurasi, Phoenix 2004–24 (did not play in 2015)

- Most triple-doubles, career

- 30 – Alyssa Thomas (2014–present)
- 7 – Jessica Shepard (2019–present)
- 4 – Sabrina Ionescu (2020–present)
- 4 - Caitlin Clark (2024–present)

- Most minutes played, career

- 18,080 – Sue Bird, Seattle 2002–22 (did not play in 2013 and 2019)
- 17,222 – Diana Taurasi, Phoenix 2004–24 (did not play in 2015)
- 17,152 – DeWanna Bonner, Phoenix 2009–19, 2025–2026; Connecticut 2020–24, Indiana 2025, Atlanta 2026–present

=== Points ===
Stats current through the 2026 season

- Most career points, regular season

- 10,646 – Diana Taurasi, Phoenix 2004–24 (did not play in 2015)
- 8,396 – Tina Charles, Connecticut 2010–13, 2025; New York 2014–19, Washington 2021, Phoenix 2022, Seattle 2022, Atlanta 2024
- 8,243 – DeWanna Bonner, Phoenix 2009–19, 2025–2026; Connecticut 2020–24, Indiana 2025, Atlanta 2026–present

- Highest points per game average, career

- 22.05 – A'ja Wilson, Las Vegas 2018–present
- 20.98 – Cynthia Cooper-Dyke, Houston 1997–2000, 2003
- 20.54 – Breanna Stewart, Seattle 2016–22 (did not play in 2019), New York 2023–present

=== Field goals ===
Stats current through the 2026 season

- Highest field goal percentage, career (min. 400 field goals)

- .5932 – Sylvia Fowles, Chicago 2008–14, Minnesota 2015–22
- .5734 – Brianna Turner, Phoenix 2019–2023, Chicago 2024, Indiana 2025, Las Vegas 2026–present
- .5601 – Crystal Langhorne, Washington 2008–13, Seattle 2014–20

- Highest 3-point field goal percentage, career (min. 100 three-pointers)

- .458 – Jennifer Azzi, Detroit 1999, Utah 2000–02, San Antonio 2003
- .430 – Laurie Koehn, Washington 2005–08, Atlanta 2012
- .425 – Leonie Fiebich, New York 2024–present

- Most field goals made, career

- 3,364 – Tina Charles, Connecticut 2010–13; 2025, New York 2014–19, Washington 2021, Phoenix 2022, Seattle 2022, Atlanta 2024
- 3,341 – Diana Taurasi, Phoenix 2004–24 (did not play in 2015)
- 3,169 – Nneka Ogwumike, Los Angeles 2012–2023; 2026–present, Seattle 2024–2025

- Most field goal attempts, career

- 7,868 – Diana Taurasi, Phoenix 2004–24 (did not play in 2015)
- 7,480 – Tina Charles, Connecticut 2010–13; 2025, New York 2014–19, Washington 2021, Phoenix 2022, Seattle 2022, Atlanta 2024
- 6,622 – DeWanna Bonner, Phoenix 2009–19, 2025–2026; Connecticut 2020–24, Indiana 2025, Atlanta 2026–present

- Most 3-point field goals made, career

- 1,447 – Diana Taurasi, Phoenix 2004–24 (did not play in 2015)
- 1,001 – Sue Bird, Seattle 2002–22 (did not play in 2013 and 2019)
- 906 – Katie Smith, Minnesota 1999–2005, Detroit 2005–09, Washington 2010, Seattle 2011–12, New York 2013

- Most 3-point attempts, career

- 4,014 – Diana Taurasi, Phoenix 2004–24 (did not play in 2015)
- 2,551 – Sue Bird, Seattle 2002–22 (did not play in 2013 and 2019)
- 2,466 – Katie Smith, Minnesota 1999–2005, Detroit 2005–09, Washington 2010, Seattle 2011–12, New York 2013

=== Free throws ===
- Highest free-throw percentage, career (min. 200 free throws)

- .937 – Elena Delle Donne, Chicago 2013–16, Washington 2017–23 (did not play in 2020)
- .911 – Sabrina Ionescu, New York 2020–present
- .898 – Kayla McBride, San Antonio/Las Vegas 2014–2020, Minnesota 2021–present

- Most free throws made, career

- 2,517 – Diana Taurasi, Phoenix 2004–24 (did not play in 2015)
- 2,035 – DeWanna Bonner, Phoenix 2009–19, 2025–2026; Connecticut 2020–24, Indiana 2025, Atlanta 2026–present
- 2,004 – Tamika Catchings, Indiana 2002–16

- Most free throw attempts, career

- 2,893 – Diana Taurasi, Phoenix 2004–24 (did not play in 2015)
- 2,386 – Tamika Catchings, Indiana 2002–16
- 2,374 – DeWanna Bonner, Phoenix 2009–19, 2025–2026; Connecticut 2020–24, Indiana 2025, Atlanta 2026–present

=== Rebounds ===
Stats current through the 2026 season

- Most rebounds, career

- 4,262 – Tina Charles, Connecticut 2010–13, 2025; New York 2014–19, Washington 2021, Phoenix 2022, Seattle 2022, Atlanta 2024
- 4,006 – Sylvia Fowles, Chicago 2008–14, Minnesota 2015–22
- 3,657 – Nneka Ogwumike, Los Angeles 2012–2023, 2026; Seattle 2024–2025

- Highest rebounds per game average, career (min. 1,000 rebounds)

- 12.56 – Angel Reese, Chicago 2024–2025, Atlanta 2026–present
- 9.82 – Sylvia Fowles, Chicago 2008–14, Minnesota 2015–22
- 9.73 – Cheryl Ford, Detroit 2003–09

- Most offensive rebounds, career

- 1,191 — Tina Charles, Connecticut 2010–13, 2025; New York 2014–19, Washington 2021, Phoenix 2022, Seattle 2022, Atlanta 2024
- 1,166 – Rebekkah Brunson, Sacramento 2004–09, Minnesota 2010–19
- 1,132 – Sylvia Fowles, Chicago 2008–14, Minnesota 2015–22

- Most defensive rebounds, career

- 3,071 – Tina Charles, Connecticut 2010–13, 2025; New York 2014–19, Washington 2021, Phoenix 2022, Seattle 2022, Atlanta 2024
- 2,874 – Sylvia Fowles, Chicago 2008–14, Minnesota 2015–22
- 2,846 – Candace Parker, Los Angeles 2008–20, Chicago 2021–22, Las Vegas 2023

=== Assists ===
Stats current through the 2026 season

- Most assists, career

- 3,234 – Sue Bird, Seattle 2002–22 (did not play in 2013 and 2019)
- 3,033 – Courtney Vandersloot, Chicago 2011–22, 2025–present; New York 2023–24
- 2,600 – Ticha Penicheiro, Sacramento 1998–2009, Los Angeles 2010–11, Chicago 2012

- Highest assists per game average, career (min. 500 assists)

- 8.44 – Caitlin Clark, Indiana 2024–present
- 6.55 – Courtney Vandersloot, Chicago 2011–22, 2025–present; New York 2023–24
- 5.72 – Ticha Penicheiro, Sacramento 1999–2009, Los Angeles 2010–11, Chicago 2012

=== Steals ===
Stats current through the 2026 season

- Most steals, career

- 1,074 – Tamika Catchings, Indiana 2002–16
- 764 – Ticha Penicheiro, Sacramento 1998–2009, Los Angeles 2010–11, Chicago 2012
- 724 – Sue Bird, Seattle 2002–22 (did not play in 2013 and 2019)

- Highest steals per game average, career (min. 100 games)

- 2.35 – Tamika Catchings, Indiana 2002–16
- 2.03 – Sheryl Swoopes, Houston 1997–2000, 2002–07, Seattle 2008, Tulsa 2011
- 2.02 – Angel McCoughtry, Atlanta 2009–16, 2018–19, Las Vegas 2020-21, Minnesota 2022

=== Blocks ===
- Most blocks, career

- 891 – Brittney Griner, Phoenix 2013–2024 (did not play in 2022); Atlanta 2025, Connecticut 2026–present
- 877 – Margo Dydek, Utah 1998–2002, San Antonio 2003–04, Connecticut 2005–07, Los Angeles 2008
- 822 – Lisa Leslie, Los Angeles 1997–2006, 2008–09

- Highest blocks per game average, career (min. 100 games)

- 2.72 – Margo Dydek, Utah 1998–2002, San Antonio 2003–04, Connecticut 2005–07, Los Angeles 2008
- 2.40 – Brittney Griner, Phoenix 2013–2024 (did not play in 2022); Atlanta 2025, Connecticut 2026–present
- 2.26 – Lisa Leslie, Los Angeles 1997–2006, 2008–09

=== Other ===
- Most disqualifications, career

- 42 – Lisa Leslie, Los Angeles 1997–2006, 2008–09
- 24 – Tangela Smith, Sacramento 1998–2004, Charlotte 2005–06, Phoenix 2007–10, Indiana 2011, San Antonio 2012
- 21 – Natalie Williams, Utah 1999–2002, Indiana 2003–05
- 21 – Ruth Riley, Miami 2001–02, Detroit 2003–06, San Antonio 2007–2011, Chicago 2012, Atlanta 2013

- Highest Win Shares, career

- 93.66 by Tamika Catchings

- Most personal fouls, career

- 1,735 – Diana Taurasi, Phoenix 2004–24 (did not play in 2015)
- 1,574 – DeLisha Milton-Jones, Los Angeles 1999–2004, Washington 2005–07, Los Angeles 2008–12, San Antonio 2013, New York 2013–14, Atlanta 2014–15
- 1,397 – Lisa Leslie, Los Angeles 1997–2006, 2008–09

== Rookie and age-related records ==
=== Points ===
Stats current through the 2026 season

- Most points, rookie season

- 790 - Olivia Miles, Minnesota 2026 (active)
- 769 - Caitlin Clark, Indiana 2024
- 744 – Seimone Augustus, Minnesota 2006

- Highest average points per game, rookie season

- 22.2* – Cynthia Cooper, Houston 1997 (*inaugural WNBA season)
- 21.9 – Seimone Augustus, Minnesota 2006
- 20.7 – A'ja Wilson, Las Vegas 2018

- Most points in first career game (WNBA debut)

- 34 – Candace Parker, Los Angeles at Phoenix, May 17, 2008
- 27 – Napheesa Collier, Minnesota vs. Chicago, May 25, 2019
- 25* – Cynthia Cooper, Houston at Cleveland, June 21, 1997 (*inaugural WNBA season)

- Most points by rookie, single game

- 44* – Cynthia Cooper, Houston at Sacramento, July 25, 1997 (*inaugural WNBA season)
- 44 – Paige Bueckers, Dallas at Los Angeles, August 20, 2025
- 40 – Candace Parker, Los Angeles vs. Houston, July 9, 2008
- 39* – Cynthia Cooper, Houston at Charlotte, August 11, 1997 (*inaugural WNBA season)
- 39 – Odyssey Sims, Tulsa at San Antonio, July 22, 2014

- Most 3-point field goals made, rookie season

- 122 – Caitlin Clark, Indiana 2024
- 85 – Rhyne Howard, Atlanta 2022
- 81 – Sonia Citron, Washington 2025

- Most 3-point field goals made by rookie, game

- 8 - Olivia Miles, Golden State at Minnesota, June 4, 2026
- 7 – Elena Baranova, Utah at New York, July 22, 1997 (*inaugural WNBA season)
- 7 – Cynthia Cooper, Houston at Sacramento, July 25, 1997 (*inaugural WNBA season)
- 7 – Crystal Robinson, New York at Los Angeles, July 24, 1999
- 7 – Caitlin Clark, Indiana at Washington, June 7, 2024
- 6 – multiple players

- Most 3-point field goals made in first career game (WNBA debut)

- 4 – nine players

=== Rebounds ===
Stats current through the 2026 season

- Most rebounds, rookie season

- 446 – Angel Reese, Chicago 2024
- 398 – Tina Charles, Connecticut 2010
- 335 – Aliyah Boston, Indiana 2023

- Highest average rebounds per game, rookie season

- 13.12 – Angel Reese, Chicago 2024
- 11.71 – Tina Charles, Connecticut 2010
- 11.34 – Yolanda Griffith, Sacramento 1999

=== Assists ===
Stats current through the 2026 season

- Most assists, rookie season

- 337 – Caitlin Clark, Indiana 2024
- 225 – Ticha Penicheiro, Sacramento 1998
- 194 – Paige Bueckers, Dallas 2025

- Highest average assists per game, rookie season

- 8.4 – Caitlin Clark, Indiana 2024
- 7.5 – Ticha Penicheiro, Sacramento 1998
- 6.4 – Suzie McConnell-Serio, Cleveland 1998

- Most assists, rookie game

- 19 – Caitlin Clark, Indiana at Dallas, July 17, 2024 (also overall WNBA record)
- 16 – Ticha Penicheiro, Sacramento at Cleveland, July 29, 1998
- 14 – Noelle Quinn, Minnesota vs. San Antonio, August 19, 2007

=== Other ===
Stats current through the 2026 season

- Most triple-doubles, rookie season

- 2 – Caitlin Clark, Indiana 2024

- Most points/assists double-doubles, rookie season

- 12 – Caitlin Clark, Indiana 2024
- 3 – Sue Bird, Seattle 2002
- 2 – four players

- Most consecutive points/assists double-doubles, rookie season

- 5 – Caitlin Clark, Indiana 2024

- Most points/rebounds double-doubles, rookie season

- 26 – Angel Reese, Chicago 2024
- 22 – Tina Charles, Connecticut 2010
- 17 – Yolanda Griffith, Sacramento 1999
- 17 – Candace Parker, Los Angeles 2008

- Most consecutive points/rebounds double-doubles, rookie season

- 15 – Angel Reese

== Team game records ==
- Longest game
  - 4 overtimes on June 28, 2026 between Washington and Portland, with Washington defeating Portland 124-123.
  - 4 overtimes on July 3, 2001 between Washington and Seattle, with Washington defeating Seattle 72-69.
- Largest margin of victory, game

- 59 – Minnesota (111) vs. Indiana (52), August 18, 2017
- 53 – Minnesota (111) at Las Vegas (58), August 2, 2025
- 48 - Las Vegas (106) vs. Phoenix (58), July 11, 2026
- 48 - New York (100) vs. Connecticut (52), June 1, 2025

- Largest margin of victory, road game

- 53 – Minnesota (111) at Las Vegas (58), August 2, 2025
- 45 – Houston (110) at Washington (65), August 17, 1998
- 39 – Sacramento (91) at Minnesota (52), July 3, 2001

- Largest deficits overcome to win

- 28 – Chicago at Las Vegas, June 21, 2022 (Chicago trailed 51–23, won 104–95)
- 25 – Los Angeles at Detroit, June 26, 2005 (Detroit trailed 35–10, won 79–73)
- 25 – Atlanta at Minnesota, September 7, 2012 (Minnesota trailed 50–25, won 97–93 (2OT))

- Most overtime periods, game

- 4 - Washington at Seattle, July 3, 2001

=== Points ===
- Most points, game

- 127 – Phoenix at Minnesota, July 24, 2010 (2OT)
- 125 — Toronto vs. Los Angeles, June 25, 2026
- 124 – Minnesota vs. Phoenix, July 24, 2010 (2OT)
- 124 – Atlanta at Los Angeles, August 20, 2026

- Most points in a half, game

- 73 – New York vs. Las Vegas, July 12, 2022 (2nd)
- 72 – Detroit vs. Phoenix, July 8, 2007 (2nd)
- 71 – Las Vegas at New York, July 14, 2022 (1st)

- Most points in a quarter, game

- 45 - Phoenix vs. Connecticut, August 10, 2023 (1st)
- 44 - New York vs. Indiana, July 23, 2023 (1st)
- 42 - Chicago vs. New York, August 7, 2019 (4th)

- Most points in an overtime period, game

- 21 – San Antonio vs. Tulsa, August 29, 2009
- 21 – New York vs. Los Angeles, June 3, 2006
- 20 – Connecticut vs. Atlanta, June 27, 2008

- Fewest points, game

- 34 – Washington at Cleveland, May 31, 2001
- 35 – Miami vs. Cleveland, June 24, 2001
- 36 – Seattle vs. Cleveland, June 14, 2001
- 36 – Washington vs. Miami, August 8, 2001

- Fewest points in a half, game

- 8 – Detroit at Houston, July 6, 2002
- 9 – Seattle vs. Cleveland, June 14, 2001
- 11 – Minnesota vs. Houston, June 30, 2001

- Fewest points in a quarter, game

- 1 – Chicago at New York, August 4, 2011
- 2 - Atlanta at Minnesota, August 3, 2017
- 2 - New York vs. Indiana, August 4, 2018
- 2 - Indiana vs. Washington, August 15, 2018

- Most points by all reserves, game

- 62 – Seattle vs. Dallas, August 22, 2025
- 62 – New York vs. Phoenix, June 22, 2008
- 61 – Los Angeles vs. Utah, June 28, 1999

- Most consecutive unanswered points, game

- 37 straight (37-0 run) by Minnesota Lynx on Aug. 18, 2017

=== Field goals ===
- Most field goals, game

- 48 — Dallas at Seattle, June 22, 2026 (OT)
- 47 – Phoenix at Minnesota, July 24, 2010 (2OT)
- 47 – Phoenix vs. Minnesota, July 29, 2010
- 46 – Phoenix at Tulsa, July 22, 2010
- 46 – Connecticut vs. Las Vegas, August 5, 2018

- Most 3-point field goals, game

- 23 – Las Vegas vs. Phoenix, August 20, 2022
- 19 – New York vs. Chicago, May 22, 2025
- 19 – New York vs. Connecticut, June 1, 2025
- 18 – Las Vegas vs. Los Angeles, May 23, 2022
- 18 – Seattle vs. Atlanta, August 12, 2020
- 18 – Washington vs. Indiana, August 18, 2019

- Highest field goal percentage, game

- .695 – Minnesota vs. Tulsa, July 10, 2012
- .655 – Los Angeles vs. Houston, June 15, 2005
- .654 – Houston at Washington, July 26, 2005

- Fewest field goals, game

- 9 – Indiana at Charlotte, June 26, 2004
- 10 – Miami vs. Seattle, July 10, 2001
- 10 – Miami vs. Cleveland, June 24, 2001
- 10 – Washington vs. Miami, August 8, 2001

- Fewest 3-point field goals, game

- 0 – by many

- Lowest field goal percentage, game

- .182 – Miami vs. Cleveland, June 24, 2001
- .188 – Indiana at Charlotte, June 26, 2004
- .196 – Washington vs. Miami, August 8, 2001

- Most field goal attempts, game

- 100 – Seattle at Phoenix, July 14, 2010 (3OT)
- 98 – Phoenix vs. Seattle, July 14, 2010 (3OT)
- 97 – Phoenix vs. Atlanta, July 19, 2008

- Most 3-point field goal attempts, game

- 36 – New York vs. Los Angeles, June 3, 2006 (OT)
- 36 – Phoenix at Detroit, July 8, 2007
- 36 – Phoenix at Tulsa, May 25, 2010

=== Rebounds ===
- Most rebounds, game

- 57 – Seattle at Phoenix, July 14, 2010 (3OT)
- 57 – Seattle vs. Tulsa, August 7, 2010
- 57 – Tulsa Shock at San Antonio Stars, June 14, 2015

- Fewest rebounds, game

- 13 – Miami at Orlando, August 11, 2001
- 14 – New York at Charlotte, July 30, 1999
- 14 – Detroit vs. Utah, August 7, 2001

- Most offensive rebounds, game

- 30 – Tulsa Shock vs. San Antonio Stars, June 14, 2015
- 25 – Sacramento at Washington, May 22, 2007
- 25 – Chicago vs. Phoenix, June 26, 2008

- Fewest offensive rebounds, game

- 0 – Houston vs. Phoenix, July 27, 2006

- Most defensive rebounds, game

- 42 – Detroit vs. Phoenix, July 8, 2007
- 40 – Utah vs. Detroit, July 6, 1999 (2OT)
- 40 – San Antonio vs. Minnesota, June 16, 2006
- 40 – Atlanta vs. Connecticut, July 7, 2010 (OT)

- Fewest defensive rebounds, game

- 6 – Houston at Los Angeles, June 15, 2005
- 8 – Washington at New York, August 13, 1998
- 8 – Miami vs. Minnesota, May 28, 2002

=== Assists ===
- Most assists, game

- 38 - Chicago vs. Portland, June 26, 2026
- 37 - Seattle at Chicago, August 10, 2022
- 35 – Minnesota vs. Chicago, September 1, 2017
- 35 - Chicago vs Connecticut, August 10, 2018
- 34 – Seattle at Chicago, August 20, 2017
- 34 – Los Angeles at Chicago, August 18, 2017

- Fewest assists, game

- 3 – Cleveland at Detroit, July 28, 2001
- 3 – Minnesota at Seattle, August 8, 2003
- 3 – Tulsa vs. Washington, July 3, 2010

=== Other ===
- Most turnovers, game

- 33 – Utah at New York, July 17, 1997
- 33 – Utah at Phoenix, August 17, 1997 (OT)
- 33 – Washington at Houston, June 29, 1998

- Fewest turnovers, game

- 2 – Dallas vs. New York, July 19, 2023
- 4 – Orlando vs. Washington, August 15, 1999
- 4 – Connecticut at Detroit, July 21, 2004
- 4 – New York vs. Connecticut, July 7, 2005
- 4 – Chicago vs. San Antonio, July 14, 2010
- 4 – Los Angeles at Chicago, July 16, 2010

- Least Team Turnovers, Half

- 0 – New York at Minnesota, July 15, 2016

- Most combined technical fouls, game

- 10 - Dallas Wings vs. Atlanta Dream, June 20, 2023

== Team season records ==
- Highest winning percentage, season

- .900, Houston 1998

- Highest winning percentage, home games, season

- 1.000, Los Angeles 2001; Seattle 2010

- Highest winning percentage, road games, season

- .867, Houston 1998

- Lowest winning percentage, season

- .088, Tulsa 2011

- Lowest winning percentage, home games, season

- .059, Atlanta 2008

- Lowest winning percentage, road games, season

- .063, Washington 1998

- Most wins, season

- 34, Las Vegas 2023
- 34, Minnesota 2025

- Most losses, season

- 32, Los Angeles 2024

- Most consecutive wins to begin season

- 13, Minnesota 2016

- Most consecutive losses to begin season

- 17, Atlanta 2008

- Most consecutive wins to end season

- 14, Connecticut 2021

=== Points ===
- Highest points per game average, season

- 93.9 – Phoenix 2010
- 92.8 – Phoenix 2009
- 90.4 - Las Vegas 2022
- 89.0 – Phoenix 2007

- Lowest points per game average, season

- 56.9 – Seattle 2000
- 57.2 – Miami 2000
- 60.0 – Seattle 2001

- Highest points per game average by all reserves, season

- 33.9 – Minnesota, 2008 (Wiggins 15.8)
- 33.4 – Sacramento, 2006 (Buescher 9.7)
- 29.0 – Los Angeles, 2006 (Holdsclaw 15.0)

== Team franchise records ==
- Highest winning percentage, all-time

- .625, Golden State Valkyries

- Most consecutive games won

- 18, Los Angeles 2001

- Most consecutive home games won

- 28, Los Angeles 2000–2002

- Most consecutive road games won

- 12, Los Angeles 2000

- Most consecutive games lost

- 20, Tulsa 2011

- Most consecutive home games lost

- 13, San Antonio 2016–2017

- Most consecutive road games lost

- 21, Phoenix 2001–2002

== Awards ==
- Most total selections to the All-WNBA Team

- Diana Taurasi with 14 selections

- Most first-team selections to the All-WNBA Team

- Diana Taurasi with 10 selections

- Most MVPs

- A'ja Wilson with 5 selections

- MVPs to win the award with more than one franchise

- Elena Delle Donne (Chicago Sky, 2015; Washington Mystics, 2019)
- Breanna Stewart (Seattle Storm, 2018; New York Liberty, 2023)

- Most total selections to the All-Defensive Team

- Tamika Catchings with 11 selections

- Most first-team selections to the All-Defensive Team

- Tamika Catchings with 10 selections

- Most Defensive Player of the Year Awards

- Tamika Catchings with 5 selections

- Only Defensive Player of the Year to win the award with more than one franchise

- Sylvia Fowles (Chicago Sky, 2011 and 2013; Minnesota Lynx, 2016 and 2021)

- Most Sixth Player of the Year Awards

- DeWanna Bonner with 3 selections

- Most Sportsmanship Awards

- Nneka Ogwumike with 5 selections

- Most Community Leadership Awards

- Tamika Catchings and Elena Delle Donne with 2 selections

- Most Coach of the Year Awards

- Cheryl Reeve with 5 selections

- Coaches of the Year to win the award with more than one franchise

- Dan Hughes (Cleveland Rockers, 2001; San Antonio Silver Stars, 2007)
- Mike Thibault (Chicago Sky, 2006 and 2008; Washington Mystics, 2013)
- Bill Laimbeer (Detroit Shock, 2003; New York Liberty, 2015)

- Most Executive of the Year Awards

- Dan Padover (Las Vegas Aces, 2020 and 2021; Atlanta Dream, 2025) – The only individual to have won the award with more than one franchise.
- Cheryl Reeve (Minnesota Lynx, 2019, 2024, 2026)

- Only player named Most Improved Player more than once

- Leilani Mitchell (2 selections)

- Most Peak Performer Awards

- Courtney Vandersloot with 7 awards (all for assists)

- Only player to win Rookie of the Year and MVP in the same season

- Candace Parker, 2008

- Only player to win all four of the league's MVP awards (season, Finals, Commissioner's Cup, All-Star Game) during her career

- Jonquel Jones — season (2021), Commissioner's Cup (2023), Finals (2024), All-Star Game (2026)
- Two players whose careers ended before the first Commissioner's Cup in 2021 won all three of the other awards:
  - Lisa Leslie – All-Star Game (1999, 2001, 2002), season (2001, 2004, 2006), Finals (2001, 2002)
  - Maya Moore – Finals (2013), season (2014), All-Star Game (2015, 2017, 2018)

== See also ==
- List of NBA regular season records
- List of WNBA post-season records
