= List of WNBA career 3-point scoring leaders =

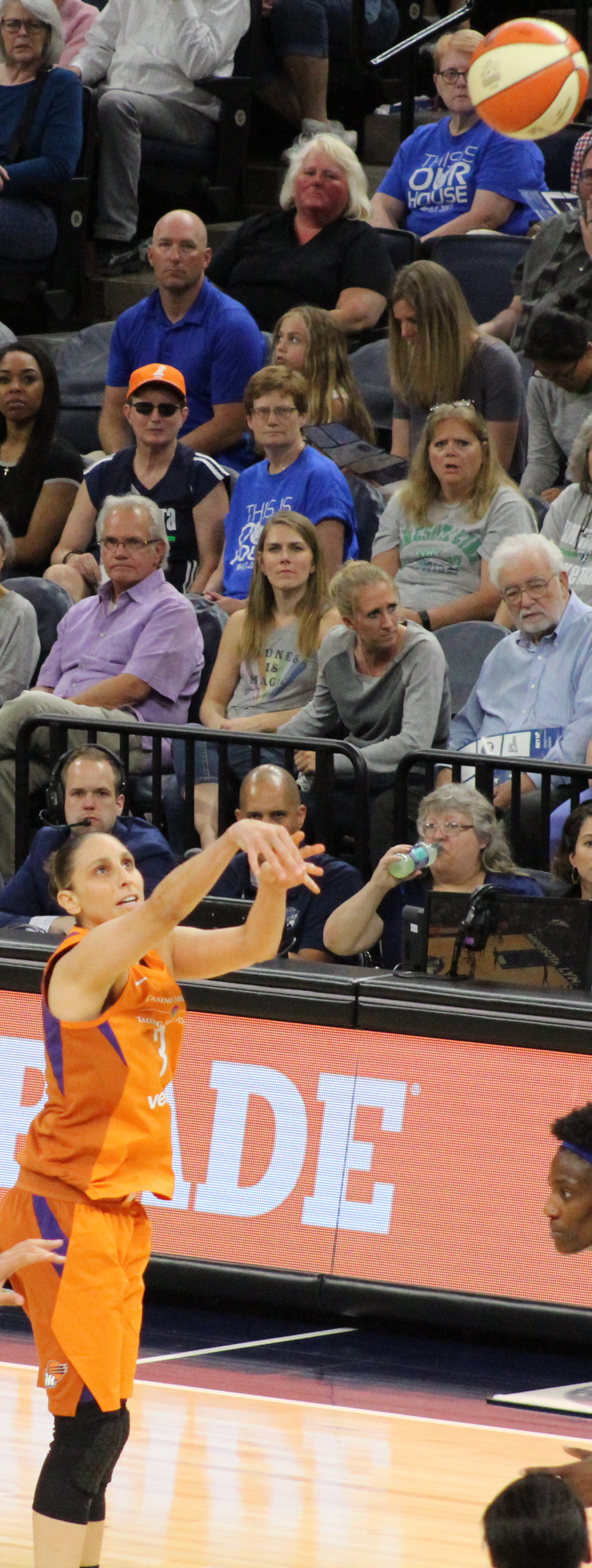
Diana Taurasi has the most 3-point field goals made in WNBA history.

This article provides two lists:

A list of WNBA career regular season three-point field goals made.
A progressive list of three-point leaders showing how the record has increased through the years.

== List of 3-point scoring leaders ==
Statistics accurate as of the 2026 season.

^	Active WNBA player
*	Inducted into the Naismith Memorial Basketball Hall of Fame
†	Not yet eligible for Hall of Fame consideration (Note: A player is not eligible for induction into the Naismith Memorial Basketball Hall of Fame until he has been fully retired for two calendar years.)
§	1st time eligible for Hall of Fame in 2025

Rank	Name	Position(s)	Team(s) played for (years)	Total 3-point field goals made	Total 3-point field goals attempted	3-point field goal percentage	3-point field goals made per game
1	Diana Taurasi^{†}	G	Phoenix Mercury (2004–2024) (Note: Taurasi did not play the 2015 season at the request of her Russian Premier League team, UMMC Ekaterinburg.)	1,447	4,014	.360	2.56
2	Sue Bird*	G	Seattle Storm (2002–2022) (Note: Bird did not play the 2013 season and 2019 season because of knee surgery.)	1,001	2,551	.392	1.73
3	Katie Smith*	G/F	Minnesota Lynx (1999–2005); Detroit Shock (2005–2008); Washington Mystics (2010); Seattle Storm (2011–2012); New York Liberty (2013)	906	2,466	.367	1.88
4	Kayla McBride^	G	San Antonio Stars/Las Vegas Aces (2014–2020); Minnesota Lynx (2021–present)	848	2,240	.379	2.01
5	Becky Hammon*	G	New York Liberty (1999–2006); San Antonio Silver Stars (2007–2013); San Antonio Stars (2014)	829	2,191	.378	1.84
6	Kelsey Mitchell^	G	Indiana Fever (2018–present)	804	2,058	.391	2.51
7	Tina Thompson*	F	Houston Comets (1997–2008); Los Angeles Sparks (2009–2011); Seattle Storm (2012–2013)	748	2,018	.371	1.51
8	Jewell Loyd^	G	Seattle Storm (2015–2024); Las Vegas Aces (2025–present)	740	2,110	.351	1.79
9	Katie Douglas	G/F	Orlando Miracle (2001–2002); Connecticut Sun (2003–2007, 2014); Indiana Fever (2008–2013)	727	1,979	.367	1.76
10	DeWanna Bonner^	F	Phoenix Mercury (2009–2019, 2025–2026); Connecticut Sun (2020–2024); Indiana Fever (2025); Atlanta Dream (2026–present)	714	2,355	.303	1.24
11	Kristi Toliver^{†}	G	Chicago Sky (2009); Los Angeles Sparks (2010–2016, 2021–2022); Washington Mystics (2017–2019, 2023)	651	1,698	.383	1.71
12	Kelsey Plum^	G	San Antonio Stars/Las Vegas Aces (2017–2024); Los Angeles Sparks (2025–2026); Phoenix Mercury (2026–present)	628	1,639	.383	2.13
13	Arike Ogunbowale^	G	Dallas Wings (2019–present)	621	1,811	.343	2.32
14	Tamika Catchings*	F	Indiana Fever (2002–2016)	606	1,704	.356	1.33
15	Kara Lawson	G	Sacramento Monarchs (2003–2009); Connecticut Sun (2010–2013); Washington Mystics (2014–2015)	584	1,498	.390	1.55
16	Nicole Powell	F	Charlotte Sting (2004); Sacramento Monarchs (2005–2009); New York Liberty (2010–2012); Tulsa Shock (2013); Seattle Storm (2014)	580	1,536	.378	1.61
17	Marina Mabrey^	G	Los Angeles Sparks (2019–2020); Dallas Wings (2020–2022); Chicago Sky (2023–2024); Connecticut Sun (2024–2025); Toronto Tempo (2026–present)	541	1,531	.353	2.06
18	Sami Whitcomb^	G	Seattle Storm (2017–2020, 2023–2024); New York Liberty (2021–2022); Phoenix Mercury (2025–present)	538	1,503	.358	1.64
19	Ivory Latta	G	Detroit Shock (2007); Atlanta Dream (2008–2009); Tulsa Shock (2010–2012); Washington Mystics (2013–2017)	536	1,453	.369	1.66
20	Renee Montgomery	G	Minnesota Lynx (2009, 2015–2017); Connecticut Sun (2010–2014); Seattle Storm (2015); Atlanta Dream (2018–2019)	532	1,533	.347	1.46
21	Maya Moore*	F	Minnesota Lynx (2011–2018)	530	1,381	.384	1.96
22	Sabrina Ionescu^	G	New York Liberty (2020–present)	519	1,513	.343	2.45
23	Allie Quigley	G	Phoenix Mercury (2008–2009); Indiana Fever (2010); San Antonio Silver Stars (2010); Seattle Storm (2011); Chicago Sky (2013–2022)	510	1,295	.394	1.47
24	Leilani Mitchell	G	New York Liberty (2008–2013); Phoenix Mercury (2015, 2017–2019); Washington Mystics (2016, 2020–2021)	508	1,319	.385	1.28
25	Allisha Gray^	G	Dallas Wings (2017–2022); Atlanta Dream (2023–present)	507	1,439	.352	1.47

== Progressive list of 3-point scoring leaders ==
This is a progressive list of 3-point scoring leaders showing how the record has increased through the years.

Statistics accurate as of the 2026 season.

^	Active WNBA player
*	Inducted into the Naismith Memorial Basketball Hall of Fame
†	Not yet eligible for Hall of Fame consideration
§	1st time eligible for Hall of Fame in 2025

Team abbreviationsTeam(s) listed is the one player was on when he established the record.
CHA	Charlotte Sting	IND	Indiana Fever	SAC	Sacramento Monarchs
CHI	Chicago Sky	LVA	Las Vegas Aces	SAS	San Antonio Stars
DAL	Dallas Wings	MIN	Minnesota Lynx	SEA	Seattle Storm
DET	Detroit Shock	NYL	New York Liberty	WAS	Washington Mystics
HOU	Houston Comets	PHO	Phoenix Mercury		

Progressive 3-point leaders
Season	Year-by-year leader	3P	Active player leader	3P	Career record	3P	Single-season record	3P	Season
1997	Cynthia Cooper* (HOU)	67	Cynthia Cooper* (HOU)	67	Cynthia Cooper* (HOU)	67	Cynthia Cooper* (HOU)	67	1997
1998	Cynthia Cooper* (HOU)	64	Cynthia Cooper* (HOU)	131	Cynthia Cooper* (HOU)	131	Cynthia Cooper* (HOU)	67	1998
1999	Crystal Robinson (NYL)	76	Cynthia Cooper* (HOU)	189	Cynthia Cooper* (HOU)	189	Crystal Robinson (NYL)	76	1999
2000	Katie Smith* (MIN)	88	Cynthia Cooper* (HOU)	232	Cynthia Cooper* (HOU)	232	Katie Smith* (MIN)	88	2000
2001	Katie Smith* (MIN)	85	Katie Smith* (MIN 2001–05) (DET 2005–09) (WAS 2010) (SEA 2011–12) (NYL 2013)	225	Cynthia Cooper* (HOU)	232	Katie Smith* (MIN)	88	2001
2002	Allison Feaster (CHA)	79	Katie Smith* (MIN 2001–05) (DET 2005–09) (WAS 2010) (SEA 2011–12) (NYL 2013)	287	Katie Smith* (MIN 2002–05) (DET 2005–09) (WAS 2010) (SEA 2011–12) (NYL 2013)	287	Katie Smith* (MIN)	88	2002
2003	Katie Smith* (MIN)	78	Katie Smith* (MIN 2001–05) (DET 2005–09) (WAS 2010) (SEA 2011–12) (NYL 2013)	365	Katie Smith* (MIN 2002–05) (DET 2005–09) (WAS 2010) (SEA 2011–12) (NYL 2013)	365	Katie Smith* (MIN)	88	2003
2004	Anna DeForge (PHO)	70	Katie Smith* (MIN 2001–05) (DET 2005–09) (WAS 2010) (SEA 2011–12) (NYL 2013)	425	Katie Smith* (MIN 2002–05) (DET 2005–09) (WAS 2010) (SEA 2011–12) (NYL 2013)	425	Katie Smith* (MIN)	88	2004
2005	Nicole Powell (SAC)	66	Katie Smith* (MIN 2001–05) (DET 2005–09) (WAS 2010) (SEA 2011–12) (NYL 2013)	478	Katie Smith* (MIN 2002–05) (DET 2005–09) (WAS 2010) (SEA 2011–12) (NYL 2013)	478	Katie Smith* (MIN)	88	2005
2006	Diana Taurasi^{†} (PHO)	121	Katie Smith* (MIN 2001–05) (DET 2005–09) (WAS 2010) (SEA 2011–12) (NYL 2013)	537	Katie Smith* (MIN 2002–05) (DET 2005–09) (WAS 2010) (SEA 2011–12) (NYL 2013)	537	Diana Taurasi^{†} (PHO)	121	2006
2007	Diana Taurasi^{†} (PHO)	95	Katie Smith* (MIN 2001–05) (DET 2005–09) (WAS 2010) (SEA 2011–12) (NYL 2013)	598	Katie Smith* (MIN 2002–05) (DET 2005–09) (WAS 2010) (SEA 2011–12) (NYL 2013)	598	Diana Taurasi^{†} (PHO)	121	2007
2008	Diana Taurasi^{†} (PHO)	89	Katie Smith* (MIN 2001–05) (DET 2005–09) (WAS 2010) (SEA 2011–12) (NYL 2013)	674	Katie Smith* (MIN 2002–05) (DET 2005–09) (WAS 2010) (SEA 2011–12) (NYL 2013)	674	Diana Taurasi^{†} (PHO)	121	2008
2009	Diana Taurasi^{†} (PHO)	79	Katie Smith* (MIN 2001–05) (DET 2005–09) (WAS 2010) (SEA 2011–12) (NYL 2013)	731	Katie Smith* (MIN 2002–05) (DET 2005–09) (WAS 2010) (SEA 2011–12) (NYL 2013)	731	Diana Taurasi^{†} (PHO)	121	2009
2010	Diana Taurasi^{†} (PHO)	80	Katie Smith* (MIN 2001–05) (DET 2005–09) (WAS 2010) (SEA 2011–12) (NYL 2013)	785	Katie Smith* (MIN 2002–05) (DET 2005–09) (WAS 2010) (SEA 2011–12) (NYL 2013)	785	Diana Taurasi^{†} (PHO)	121	2010
2011	Diana Taurasi^{†} (PHO)	81	Katie Smith* (MIN 2001–05) (DET 2005–09) (WAS 2010) (SEA 2011–12) (NYL 2013)	834	Katie Smith* (MIN 2002–05) (DET 2005–09) (WAS 2010) (SEA 2011–12) (NYL 2013)	834	Diana Taurasi^{†} (PHO)	121	2011
2012	Katie Douglas (IND) Becky Hammon* (SAS)	80	Katie Smith* (MIN 2001–05) (DET 2005–09) (WAS 2010) (SEA 2011–12) (NYL 2013)	878	Katie Smith* (MIN 2002–05) (DET 2005–09) (WAS 2010) (SEA 2011–12) (NYL 2013)	878	Diana Taurasi^{†} (PHO)	121	2012
2013	Ivory Latta (WAS) Maya Moore* (MIN)	72	Katie Smith* (MIN 2001–05) (DET 2005–09) (WAS 2010) (SEA 2011–12) (NYL 2013)	906	Katie Smith* (MIN 2002–05) (DET 2005–09) (WAS 2010) (SEA 2011–12) (NYL 2013)	906	Diana Taurasi^{†} (PHO)	121	2013
2014	Ivory Latta (WAS)	81	Becky Hammon* (SAS)	829	Katie Smith* (MIN 2002–05) (DET 2005–09) (WAS 2010) (SEA 2011–12) (NYL 2013)	906	Diana Taurasi^{†} (PHO)	121	2014
2015	Ivory Latta (WAS)	79	Sue Bird* (SEA)	664	Katie Smith* (MIN 2002–05) (DET 2005–09) (WAS 2010) (SEA 2011–12) (NYL 2013)	906	Diana Taurasi^{†} (PHO)	121	2015
2016	Diana Taurasi^{†} (PHO)	89	Diana Taurasi^{†} (PHO)	900	Katie Smith* (MIN 2002–05) (DET 2005–09) (WAS 2010) (SEA 2011–12) (NYL 2013)	906	Diana Taurasi^{†} (PHO)	121	2016
2017	Diana Taurasi^{†} (PHO)	96	Diana Taurasi^{†} (PHO)	996	Diana Taurasi^{†} (PHO)	996	Diana Taurasi^{†} (PHO)	121	2017
2018	Diana Taurasi^{†} (PHO)	106	Diana Taurasi^{†} (PHO)	1,102	Diana Taurasi^{†} (PHO)	1,102	Diana Taurasi^{†} (PHO)	121	2018
2019	Allie Quigley (CHI)	80	Diana Taurasi^{†} (PHO)	1,103	Diana Taurasi^{†} (PHO)	1,103	Diana Taurasi^{†} (PHO)	121	2019
2020	Diana Taurasi^{†} (PHO)	61	Diana Taurasi^{†} (PHO)	1,164	Diana Taurasi^{†} (PHO)	1,164	Diana Taurasi^{†} (PHO)	121	2020
2021	Arike Ogunbowale^ (DAL)	80	Diana Taurasi^{†} (PHO)	1,205	Diana Taurasi^{†} (PHO)	1,205	Diana Taurasi^{†} (PHO)	121	2021
2022	Kelsey Plum^ (LVA)	113	Diana Taurasi^{†} (PHO)	1,297	Diana Taurasi^{†} (PHO)	1,297	Diana Taurasi^{†} (PHO)	121	2022
2023	Sabrina Ionescu^ (NYL)	128	Diana Taurasi^{†} (PHO)	1,361	Diana Taurasi^{†} (PHO)	1,361	Sabrina Ionescu^ (NYL)	128	2023
2024	Caitlin Clark^ (IND)	122	Diana Taurasi^{†} (PHO)	1,447	Diana Taurasi^{†} (PHO)	1,447	Sabrina Ionescu^ (NYL)	128	2024
2025	Kelsey Mitchell^ (IND)	111	Kayla McBride^ (MIN)	722	Diana Taurasi^{†} (PHO)	1,447	Sabrina Ionescu^ (NYL)	128	2025
2026	Kelsey Mitchell^ (IND)	135	Kayla McBride^ (MIN)	848	Diana Taurasi^{†} (PHO)	1,447	Kelsey Mitchell^ (IND)	135	2026
Season	Year-by-year leader	3P	Active player leader	3P	Career record	3P	Single-season record	3P	Season

== See also ==
- List of WNBA regular season records
- List of National Basketball Association career 3-point scoring leaders
