= List of WNBA career minutes played leaders =

A list of Women's National Basketball Association players by total career regular season leaders in minutes played.

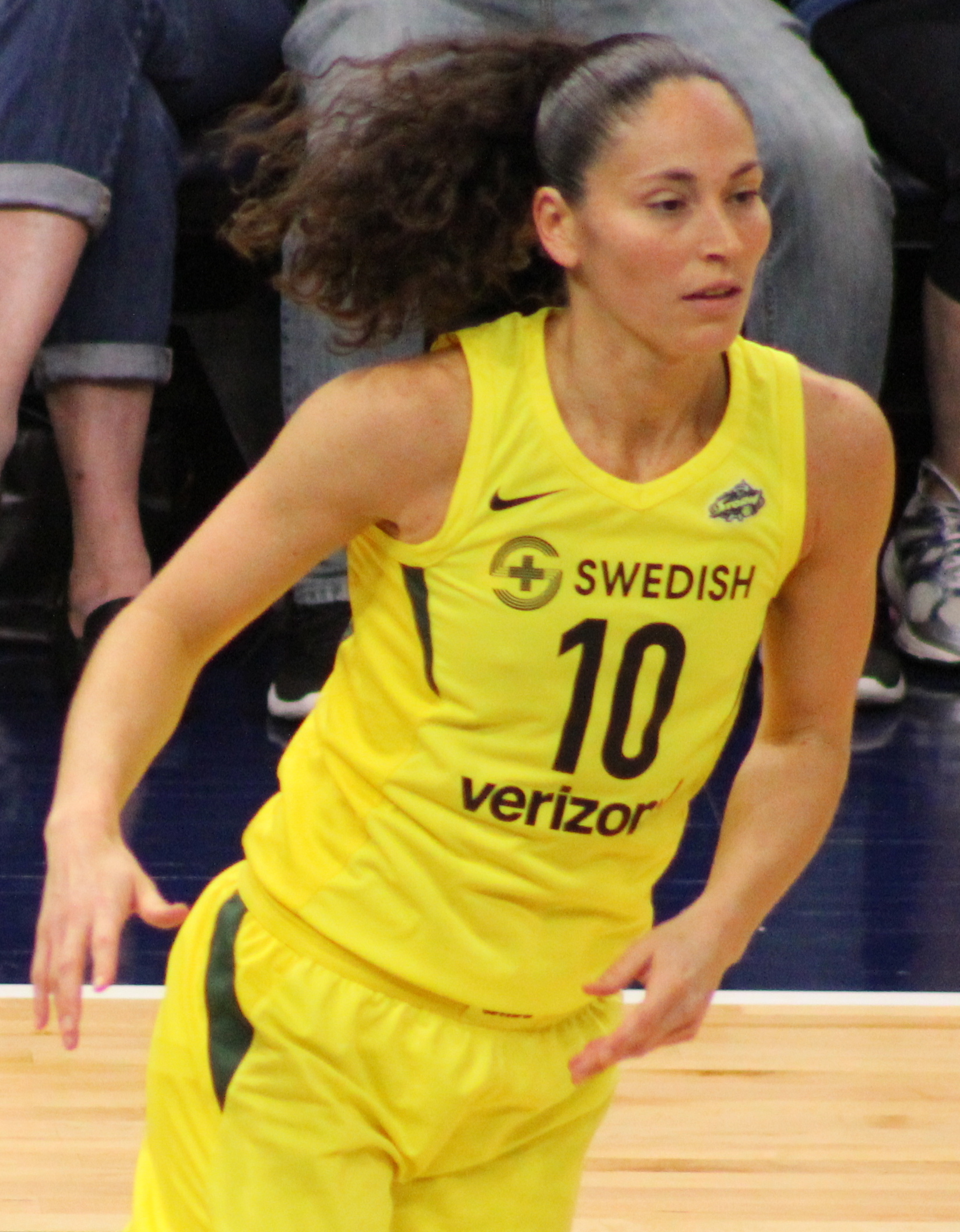
Sue Bird has played the most minutes in WNBA history.

== Minutes played leaders ==
This is a list of Women's National Basketball Association players by total career regular season leaders in minutes played.

Statistics accurate as of the 2026 season.

^	Active WNBA player
*	Inducted into the Naismith Memorial Basketball Hall of Fame
†	Not yet eligible for Hall of Fame consideration (Note: A player is not eligible for induction into the Naismith Memorial Basketball Hall of Fame until he has been fully retired for two calendar years.)
§	1st time eligible for Hall of Fame in 2026

Rank	Player	Position(s)	Team(s)	Total minutes	Games played	Minutes per game average (Note: Average is rounded to the nearest tenth.)
1	Sue Bird*	PG	Seattle Storm (2002–2022) (Note: Bird did not play the 2013 season and 2019 season because of knee surgery.)	18,080	580	31.2
2	Diana Taurasi^{†}	G	Phoenix Mercury (2004–2024) (Note: Taurasi did not play the 2015 season at the request of her Russian Premier League team, UMMC Ekaterinburg.)	17,322	565	30.7
3	DeWanna Bonner^	SG/SF	Phoenix Mercury (2009–2019, 2025–2026); Connecticut Sun (2020–2024); Indiana Fever (2025); Atlanta Dream (2026–present)	17,152	577	29.7
4	Tina Thompson*	SF/PF	Houston Comets (1997–2008); Los Angeles Sparks (2009–2011); Seattle Storm (2012–2013)	16,089	496	32.4
5	Katie Smith*	SG/SF	Minnesota Lynx (1999–2005); Detroit Shock (2006–2009); Washington Mystics (2010); Seattle Storm (2011–2013); New York Liberty (2013)	15,725	482	32.6
6	Candice Dupree	PF	Chicago Sky (2006–2009); Phoenix Mercury (2010–2016); Indiana Fever (2017–2020); Seattle Storm (2021); Atlanta Dream (2021)	15,154	494	30.7
7	Tina Charles†	C	Connecticut Sun (2010–2013, 2025); New York Liberty (2014–2019); Washington Mystics (2021); Phoenix Mercury (2022); Seattle Storm (2022); Atlanta Dream (2024)	14,962	473	31.6
8	Nneka Ogwumike^	PF	Los Angeles Sparks (2012–2023); Seattle Storm (2024–present)	14,406	480	30.0
9	DeLisha Milton-Jones	SF/PF	Los Angeles Sparks (1999–2004, 2008–2012); Washington Mystics (2005–2007); San Antonio Silver Stars (2013); New York Liberty (2013–2014); Atlanta Dream (2014–2015)	14,395	499	28.8
10	Tamika Catchings*	SF	Indiana Fever (2002–2016)	14,387	457	31.5
11	Lindsay Whalen*	PG	Connecticut Sun (2004–2009); Minnesota Lynx (2010–2018)	13,601	480	28.3
12	Taj McWilliams-Franklin	PF/C	Orlando Miracle / Connecticut Sun (1999–2006); Los Angeles Sparks (2007); Washington Mystics (2008); Detroit Shock (2008–2009); New York Liberty (2010); Minnesota Lynx (2011–2012)	13,546	440	30.8
13	Swin Cash*	SF	Detroit Shock (2002–2007); Seattle Storm (2008–2011); Chicago Sky (2012–2013); Atlanta Dream (2014); New York Liberty (2014–2016)	13,451	479	28.1
14	Courtney Vandersloot^	PG	Chicago Sky (2011–2022, 2025–present); New York Liberty (2023–2024)	12,819	463	27.7
15	Ticha Penicheiro	PG	Sacramento Monarchs (1998–2009); Los Angeles Sparks (2010–2011); Chicago Sky (2012)	12,796	454	28.2
16	Cappie Pondexter	SG	Phoenix Mercury (2006–2009); New York Liberty (2010–2014); Chicago Sky (2015–2017); Los Angeles Sparks (2018); Indiana Fever (2018)	12,785	416	30.7
17	Kayla McBride^	SG	San Antonio Stars/Las Vegas Aces (2014–2020); Minnesota Lynx (2021–present)	12,739	418	30.5
18	Tangela Smith	PF/C	Sacramento Monarchs (1998–2004); Charlotte Sting (2005–2006); Phoenix Mercury (2007–2010); Indiana Fever (2011); San Antonio Stars (2012)	12,734	463	27.5
19	Katie Douglas	SG/SF	Orlando Miracle / Connecticut Sun (2001–2007, 2014); Indiana Fever (2008–2013)	12,630	412	30.7
20	Becky Hammon*	PG	New York Liberty (1999–2006); San Antonio Stars (2007–2014)	12,544	450	27.9
21	Candace Parker^{†}	PF	Los Angeles Sparks (2008–2020); Chicago Sky (2021–2022); Las Vegas Aces (2023)	12,445	410	30.4
22	Vickie Johnson	SG	New York Liberty (1997–2005); San Antonio Silver Stars (2006–2009)	12,435	410	30.3
23	Alyssa Thomas^	Power forward	Connecticut Sun (2014–2024); Phoenix Mercury (2025–present)	12,368	401	30.8
24	Alana Beard	SG/SF	Washington Mystics (2004–2009); Los Angeles Sparks (2012–2019)	12,330	420	29.4
25	Sylvia Fowles^{†}	C	Chicago Sky (2008–2014); Minnesota Lynx (2015–2022)	12,320	408	30.2

== See also ==
- List of WNBA regular season records
