= Diana Taurasi =

American basketball player (born 1982)

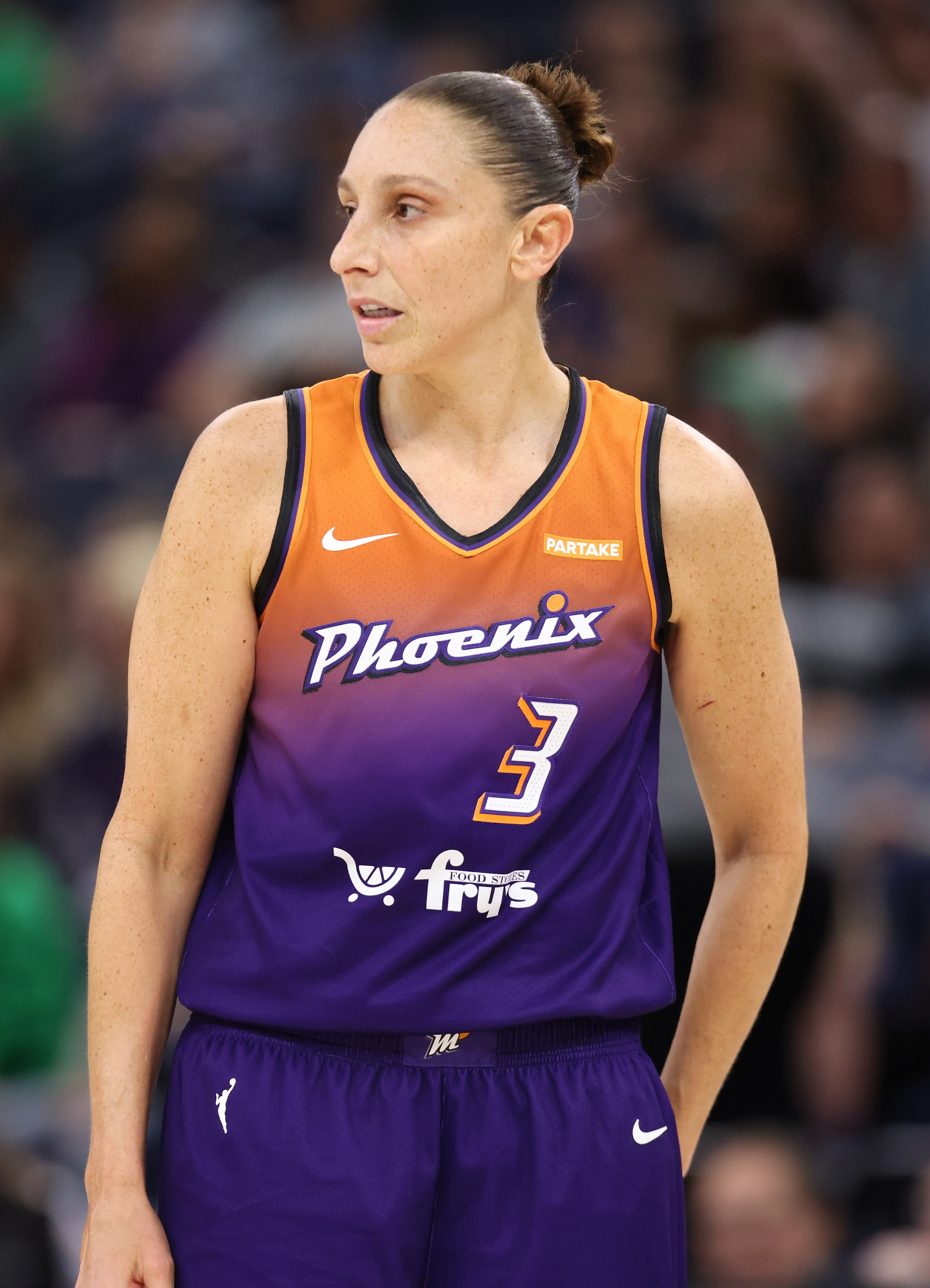
- Taurasi in 2024

Personal information
- Born: June 11, 1982 (age 44) Glendale, California, U.S.
- Listed height: 6 ft 0 in (1.83 m)
- Listed weight: 163 lb (74 kg)

Career information
- High school: Don Antonio Lugo (Chino, California)
- College: UConn (2000–2004)
- WNBA draft: 2004: 1st round, 1st overall pick
- Drafted by: Phoenix Mercury
- Playing career: 2004–2024
- Position: Shooting guard / point guard
- Number: 3

Career history
- 2004–2024: Phoenix Mercury
- 2005–2006: Dynamo Moscow
- 2006–2010: Spartak Moscow
- 2010–2011: Fenerbahçe
- 2011–2012: Galatasaray Medical Park
- 2012–2017: UMMC Ekaterinburg

Career highlights
- 3× WNBA champion (2007, 2009, 2014); 2× WNBA Finals MVP (2009, 2014); WNBA MVP (2009); 11× WNBA All-Star (2005–2007, 2009, 2011, 2013, 2014, 2017, 2018, 2021, 2024); 10× All-WNBA First Team (2004, 2006–2011, 2013, 2014, 2018); 4× All-WNBA Second Team (2005, 2016, 2017, 2020); WNBA Rookie of the Year (2004); 5× WNBA scoring champion (2006, 2008–2011); WNBA assists leader (2014); 6× WNBA Peak Performer (2006, 2007, 2009–2011, 2014); WNBA anniversary teams (15th, 20th, 25th); No. 3 retired by Phoenix Mercury; 6× EuroLeague champion (2007–2010, 2013, 2016); 7× Russian National League champion (2007, 2008, 2013–2017); 3× Russian Cup winner (2013–2014, 2017); 3× Russian League Player of the Year (2007, 2008, 2009); Turkish National League champion (2011); Turkish Cup winner (2012); 3× NCAA champion (2002–2004); 2× NCAA Tournament MOP (2003, 2004); Wade Trophy (2003); 2× Honda Sports Award (2003, 2004); 2× Naismith College Player of the Year (2003, 2004); USBWA Women's National Player of the Year (2003); AP College Player of the Year (2003); 2× Nancy Lieberman Award (2003, 2004); 2× Big East Player of the Year (2003, 2004); 2× First-team All-American – AP (2003, 2004); 3× Kodak All-American (2002–2004); 2× All-American –USBWA (2003, 2004); Second-team All-American – AP (2002); 3× First-team All-Big East (2002–2004); Big East tournament MOP (2001); Big East All-Freshman Team (2001); Naismith Prep Player of the Year (2000); 4× USA Basketball Female Athlete of the Year (2006, 2010, 2012, 2016)

Career WNBA statistics
- Points: 10,646 (18.8 ppg)
- Rebounds: 2,210 (3.9 rpg)
- Assists: 2,394 (4.2 apg)
- Stats at WNBA.com
- Stats at Basketball Reference
Medals
Women's basketball
Representing the United States
Olympic Games
Gold medal – first place	2004 Athens	Team
Gold medal – first place	2008 Beijing	Team
Gold medal – first place	2012 London	Team
Gold medal – first place	2016 Rio de Janeiro	Team
Gold medal – first place	2020 Tokyo	Team
Gold medal – first place	2024 Paris	Team
World Championship
Gold medal – first place	2010 Czech Republic
Gold medal – first place	2014 Turkey
Gold medal – first place	2018 Spain
Bronze medal – third place	2006 Brazil
FIBA Under-19 World Cup
Bronze medal – third place	2001 Czech Republic	Team
FIBA Under-18 Americas Championship
Gold medal – first place	2000 Argentina	Team

Diana Lorena Taurasi (born June 11, 1982) is an American former professional basketball player. She played 20 seasons in the Women's National Basketball Association (WNBA), spending her entire WNBA career with the Phoenix Mercury. A global basketball icon, Taurasi helped grow the visibility of the women's game and is credited with elevating the WNBA's standard of play. She is often considered the greatest player in women's basketball history and holds the all-time WNBA scoring record. She is the most decorated Olympic athlete in any team sport, winning six Olympic gold medals with the United States women's national basketball team.

Taurasi was the top recruit in her class and earned national player of the year honors at Don Antonio Lugo High School in her hometown of Chino, California. She played college basketball for UConn, which she led to three consecutive national titles. She was twice named national college player of the year and is regarded as one of the greatest collegiate players of all time. Selected first overall by the Mercury in the 2004 WNBA draft, Taurasi quickly emerged as the league's best scorer and gained a reputation for her clutch scoring ability and competitiveness, which earned her the nickname "White Mamba". Her WNBA accolades include three league championships, two Finals Most Valuable Player awards, one MVP award, five scoring titles, 10 All-WNBA First Team selections, and 11 All-Star selections. Taurasi is the WNBA all-time leader in points, three-pointers, field goals, and free throws. She was also a decorated player overseas, playing in Russia and Turkey and winning six EuroLeague Women titles.

Internationally, Taurasi was a central figure on the United States women's national team, and with former college teammate Sue Bird established it as one of the greatest sports dynasties. She won six Olympic gold medals and three FIBA World Cup championships, and is a four-time USA Basketball Female Athlete of the Year. Taurasi holds the team record for games played in the Olympics (44) and scored the second-most points in team history.

== Early life ==
Taurasi was born in Glendale, California and grew up in Chino, California. Taurasi's father, Mario, was raised in Argentina. He was a professional soccer player in Italy and played for several years as a goalkeeper. Taurasi's mother, Liliana, is Argentine. Mario and Liliana Taurasi emigrated from Argentina to the United States before Diana was born. She has an older sister named Jessika.

When Taurasi was in middle school her parents moved the family back to Argentina to be closer to their extended family. After about a year, the family was robbed and held at gun point in their home. Following the incident Taurasi's parents decided to move the family back to California. Taurasi attended Don Antonio Lugo High School, where she graduated in 2000. In high school, Taurasi was the recipient of the 2000 Cheryl Miller Award, presented by the Los Angeles Times to the best player in Southern California. She was also recognized as the 1999 and 2000 Ms. Basketball State Player of the Year, the 2000 Naismith and "Parade Magazine" National High School Player of the Year. With 3,047 points, Taurasi concluded her prep career ranked fourth in state history. The Women's Basketball Coaches Association (WBCA) designated Taurasi an all-American in 2000. She participated in the 2000 WBCA High School All-America Game, where she scored twelve points and earned MVP honors.

== College career ==
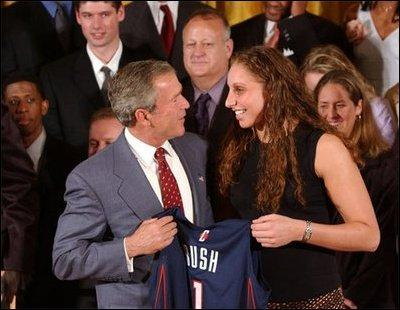
Taurasi (right) with President George W. Bush at a White House ceremony for the national champion 2002–03 Connecticut Huskies

Following a highly decorated high school career, Taurasi enrolled at the University of Connecticut (UConn) and began playing for the women's basketball team during the 2000–2001 season primarily as a point guard and shooting guard. After a poor shooting performance in UConn's 2001 Final Four loss to Notre Dame, Taurasi vowed, "We will not lose another tournament game while I'm wearing this uniform." They proceeded to win three straight national titles. Leading up to the final championship win, her coach, Geno Auriemma, would declare his likelihood of winning with the claim, "We have Diana, and you don't."

Taurasi also received many personal accolades at UConn, including the 2003 and 2004 Naismith College Player of the Year awards, the 2003 Wade Trophy, the 2003 and 2004 Honda Sports Award and the 2003 Associated Press Player of the Year award. Additionally, Taurasi received honors and praise within the state of Connecticut. For example, state senator Thomas Gaffey nominated her to join Prudence Crandall as the state's heroine.

She averaged 15.0 points, 4.3 rebounds and 4.5 assists per game in her collegiate career. During her time at UConn, her team compiled a record of 139 wins and eight losses. In 2005, after taking a break from school to enter the WNBA draft, play in the Olympics, and then return to finish her first season in the WNBA, Taurasi went back to UConn and earned her bachelor's degree. As a first-generation college student, the first in her family to graduate from college, Taurasi said that earning her college degree "meant just as much as any championship ring, banner or gold medal."

In 2006, Taurasi was a member of the inaugural class of inductees to the University of Connecticut women's basketball "Huskies of Honor" recognition program. In October 2025, the Associated Press selected Taurasi as one of the greatest collegiate players in the women's poll era alongside Caitlin Clark, Cheryl Miller, Candace Parker, and Breanna Stewart as the starting five players.

== WNBA career ==
=== 2004–2006: WNBA beginnings ===
Following her collegiate career, Taurasi was selected first overall in the 2004 WNBA draft by the Phoenix Mercury, a team that went 8–26 in the 2003 season. In her WNBA debut, Taurasi scored 22 points in a 72–66 Mercury loss to the Sacramento Monarchs. For her rookie season, she averaged 17.0 points, 4.4 rebounds and 3.9 assists per game. Although the Mercury did not qualify for the playoffs, Taurasi was named to the Western Conference All-Star team and won the WNBA Rookie of the Year Award.

In 2005, Taurasi averaged 16.0 points, 4.2 rebounds and 4.5 assists per game while battling an ankle injury. She was an All-Star for the second straight year, but the Mercury faded down the stretch and again missed the playoffs. Former NBA coach Paul Westhead became the Mercury's head coach heading into the 2006 season and brought his up-tempo style to Phoenix. Taurasi went on to have a historic season under Westhead's coaching, leading the league in scoring and earning a third straight trip to the All-Star Game. She broke Katie Smith's league record for points in a season with 741 points. In 2006, Taurasi averaged a WNBA record 25.3 points, 4.1 assists and 3.6 rebounds per game, including a then-league record 47 points in a triple overtime regular season victory against the Houston Comets. During that game, she made a then-WNBA record eight three-pointers. Taurasi also set a WNBA record with 121 three-pointers in a single season. The Mercury finished 18–16 but missed the playoffs after losing a tie-breaker with Houston and Seattle.

=== 2007–2009: Two WNBA championships ===
In 2007, Taurasi reached the WNBA playoffs for the first time. In the first round, the Mercury eliminated the Seattle Storm two games to none. Next, they swept the San Antonio Silver Stars, and Taurasi advanced to her first WNBA Finals, against the defending champion Detroit Shock. The Mercury went on to win their first WNBA title. With this victory, Taurasi became the seventh player ever to win an NCAA title, a WNBA title, and an Olympic gold medal.

In the 2009 season, Taurasi was named the WNBA MVP and later led the Phoenix Mercury to its second WNBA championship in three years by beating the Indiana Fever, three games to two, as Taurasi was named the WNBA Finals MVP. Taurasi was the second player, after Cynthia Cooper-Dyke, to win the season scoring title, the season MVP award, a WNBA Championship and the finals MVP in the same season.

=== 2010–2013: Injury and return ===
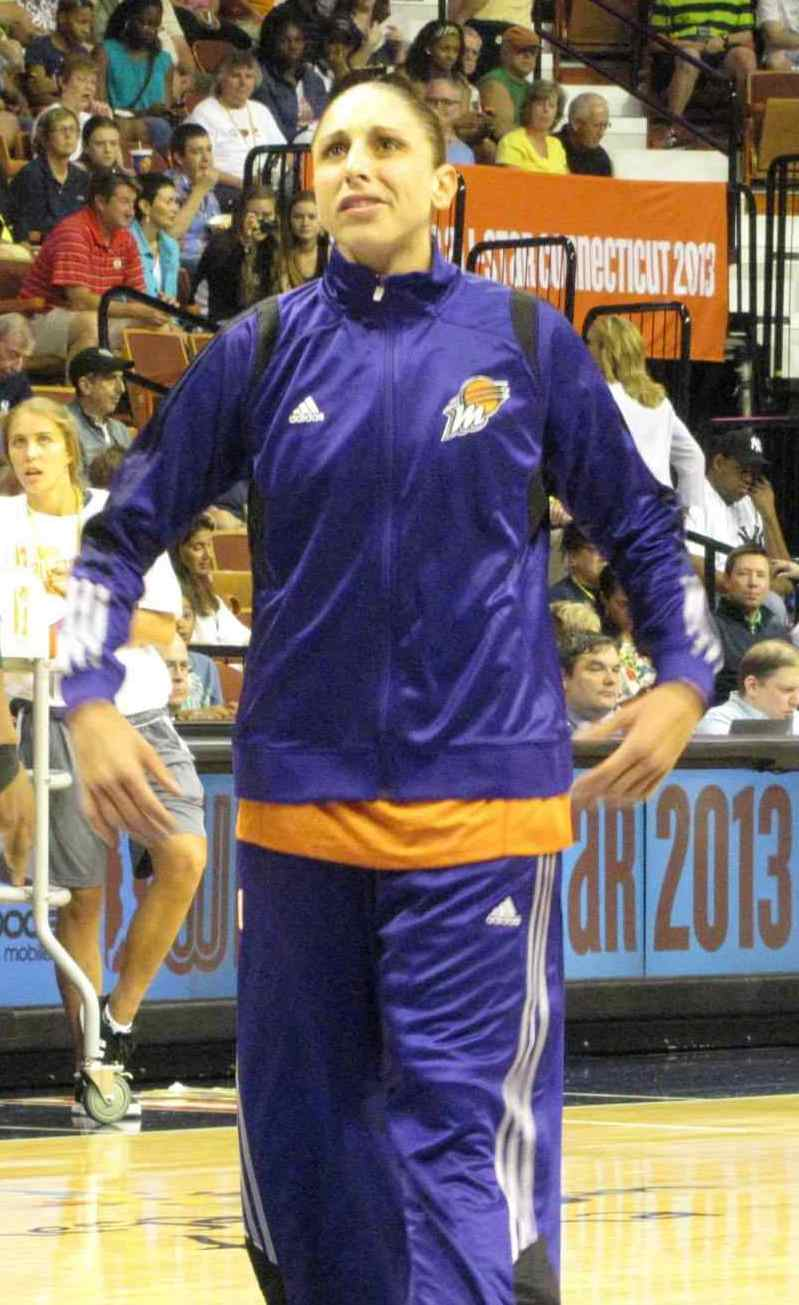
Taurasi in 2013

In 2011, after being selected to her seventh All-WNBA First Team, Taurasi was voted one of the Top 15 players in the fifteen-year history of the WNBA by fans. In 2012, Taurasi had an injury-riddled season, playing only eight games. She had to sit out the rest of the season with a strained left hip flexor. The Mercury proceeded to finish the season 7–27 as the second-worst team in the league.

In 2013, Taurasi returned healthy for the season, and she played 32 games and averaged over 20 points per game for the sixth time in her career. The Mercury finished third in the Western Conference with a 19–15 record. They defeated the Los Angeles Sparks 2–1 in the first round, advancing to the conference finals, but would lose to the Minnesota Lynx in a two-game sweep.

=== 2014: Third WNBA championship ===
Entering the 2014 season, Taurasi reached the number two spot in career points per game, fifth place in career points, and ninth in career assists. In the 2014 season, with a supporting cast of all-star power forward Candice Dupree, rising star Brittney Griner and new head coach Sandy Brondello, the Phoenix Mercury finished 29–5, setting the record for most wins in a regular season and earning the top seed in the Western Conference. In the playoffs, they advanced to the WNBA Finals, where they would sweep the Chicago Sky, earning Taurasi her third championship. Taurasi also won the WNBA Finals MVP for the second time in her career.

=== 2015–2016: WNBA sit out and return ===
On February 3, 2015, Taurasi announced that she would sit out the 2015 WNBA season at the request of her Russian Premier League team, UMMC Ekaterinburg. The team offered to pay Taurasi more than her WNBA salary to skip the 2015 WNBA season. For the 2014 WNBA season, Taurasi made just under the league maximum of $107,000. However, she made 14 times that – approximately $1.5 million – playing overseas.

Taurasi returned to the Mercury for the 2016 WNBA season. She averaged 17.8 points per game, helping the Mercury to another playoff berth with a 16–18 record. With the WNBA's new playoff format in effect, the Mercury were the number eight seed in the league, facing the Indiana Fever in the first round. The Mercury advanced to the second round, beating the Fever in the first-round elimination game as Taurasi scored 20 points. During that game, Taurasi made her 113th playoff career three-pointer, passing Becky Hammon as the all-time WNBA leader in playoff career three-pointers made. In the second-round elimination game, the Mercury beat the New York Liberty and advanced to the semi-finals with Taurasi scoring a game-high 30 points in the win. In the semi-finals, the Mercury were swept by the defending champions, the Minnesota Lynx, in the best-of-five series.

=== 2017: WNBA all-time leading scorer ===
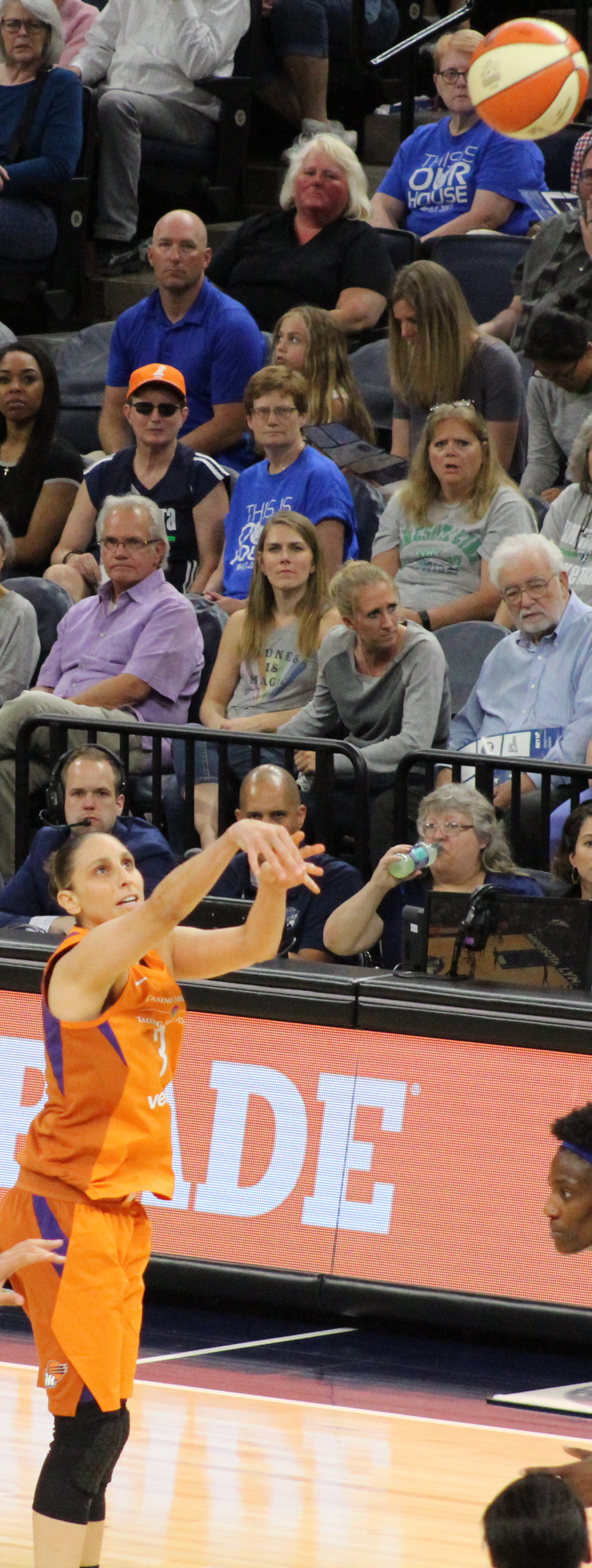
Taurasi became the WNBA's all-time highest scorer in 2017

In May 2017, Taurasi signed a multi-year contract extension with the Mercury. Later that month, Taurasi became the first player in league history reach 7,000 points, 1,500 rebounds and 1,500 assists following an 85–62 victory over the Indiana Fever. On June 18, 2017, Taurasi became the WNBA's all-time leading scorer, passing Tina Thompson's record. Taurasi would be selected into the 2017 WNBA All-Star Game, making it her eighth career All-Star game appearance. The Mercury would finish with an 18–16 record as the fifth seed in the league. In the first-round elimination game, Taurasi scored 14 points in a 79–69 win over the Seattle Storm. In the second-round elimination game, the Mercury defeated the Connecticut Sun 88–83, with Taurasi scoring 23 points in the win. The Mercury advanced past the second round for the second season in a row but were eliminated by the Los Angeles Sparks in a three-game sweep.

=== 2018: Continued success ===
In the 2018 season-opener on May 18, 2018, against the Dallas Wings, Taurasi became the first player in WNBA history to make 1,000 3-pointers. On June 5, 2018, Taurasi became the first player in WNBA history to score 8,000 points in an 80–74 victory against the Liberty. Then on July 8, 2018, Taurasi became the league's all-time leader in field goals made in an 84–77 victory against the Connecticut Sun, surpassing Tina Thompson. Taurasi would also earn her ninth career All-Star appearance after being voted into the 2018 WNBA All-Star Game. On August 1, 2018, Taurasi scored a season-high 37 points in a 104–93 victory against the Las Vegas Aces. The Mercury finished off the season 20–14 with the number five seed in the league. In the first-round elimination game, the Mercury defeated the Dallas Wings 101–83. Taurasi scored 26 points in the win. In the second-round elimination game, the Mercury defeated the Connecticut Sun 96–86, advancing to the semi-finals for the third year in a row. In the series against the Seattle Storm, the Mercury came back from 0–2 to tie the series 2–2. In game 5, the Mercury lost 94–84, ending their season.

=== 2019–2020: Injury and COVID-19 ===
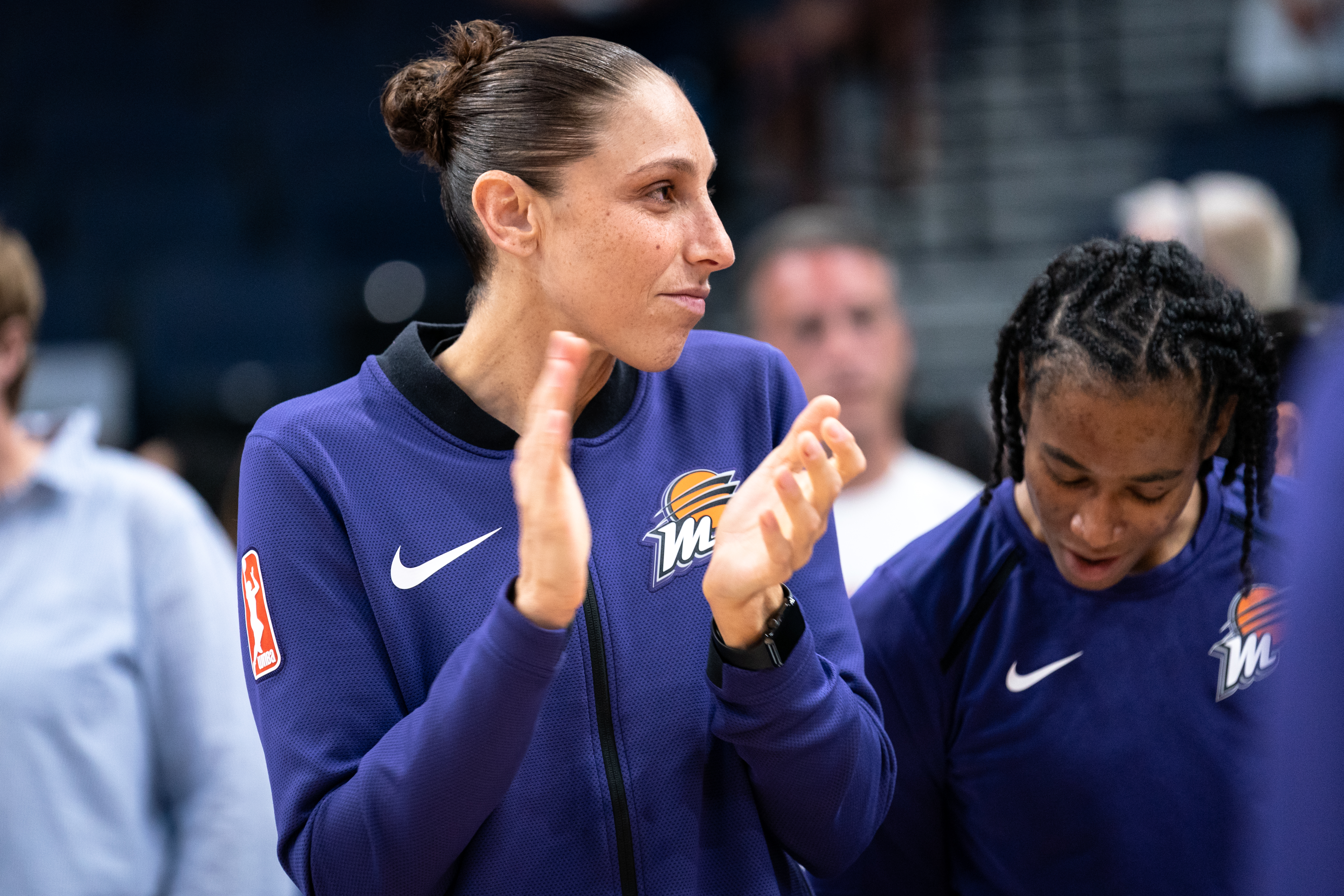
Taurasi in 2019

In April 2019, the Mercury announced that Taurasi's wife, Penny Taylor, had been hired as an assistant coach. Taurasi started the 2019 WNBA season on the injured list after undergoing back surgery. A hamstring injury limited her to only six games with very minimal playing time. Without a healthy Taurasi, the Mercury barely made the playoffs as the number eight seed with a 15–19 record. The Mercury were eliminated in the first-round elimination game 105–76 by the Chicago Sky. In September 2019, Taurasi confirmed that she intended to play for the team in 2020.

In 2020, the season was delayed and shortened to 22 games in a bubble at IMG Academy due to the COVID-19 pandemic. Taurasi would come back healthy for the season and played 19 of the 22 games. On August 23, 2020, Taurasi scored a season-high 34 points in an 88–87 victory over the Washington Mystics while honoring the late Kobe Bryant on his birthday by wearing number 8 along with his last name on her jersey. The Mercury had finished 13–9 as the number five seed and defeated the Washington Mystics 85–84 in the first round elimination game; however, they were eliminated by the Minnesota Lynx in the second-round elimination game by a final score of 80–79.

=== 2021–2024: Final seasons ===
In February 2021, Taurasi re-signed with the Mercury on a two-year deal. She injured her ankle and broke a bone in her foot late in the 2021 season and opted to sit out of the first-round elimination game against the New York Liberty. She returned for the second-round elimination game against the reigning champions Seattle Storm, which the Mercury won in overtime. In the best-of-five semi-final series against the Las Vegas Aces, Taurasi led her team to a tie series after a Game 1 loss. During that game, Taurasi, aged 39, made history as the oldest player in league history to score an over 30-point game. Her eight three-pointers were the second-most made in a playoff game in the WNBA's postseason history. The Mercury would go on to win the semi-finals in Game 5.

In August 2023, Taurasi became the first player in WNBA history to score 10,000 career points.

In February 2025, Taurasi, who was 42 at the time, retired.

== Overseas career ==
=== 2005–2010: Russian Premier League ===
Taurasi's international career began in 2005 when she played for Dynamo Moscow, a team that had been dominant in the Russian league until the late 90s. Their 2005 EuroLeague tournament ended in the quarter-finals, where Dynamo was eliminated by former champions CSKA Samara. In 2006, Taurasi was recruited to play for the Russian team Spartak Moscow. The team had finished in 11th place in the Russian league when Shabtai von Kalmanovich decided to buy the team. The team would go on to win four consecutive EuroLeague championships from 2007 to 2010, and Taurasi was named Final Four MVP in 2009 and 2010.

=== 2010–2012: Turkish Super League ===
In 2010, Taurasi played for the Turkish team Fenerbahçe, helping the team to repeat winning the national league. On December 24, 2010, Taurasi's lawyers revealed that she had tested positive for a mild stimulant. According to her lawyer, Howard Jacobs, the positive test came from an "A" sample and testing had been requested on a second "B" sample. Until the "B" sample could be tested, Taurasi was provisionally suspended from the Turkish league. In a statement, the Turkish Basketball Federation revealed that the WADA-list banned substance was modafinil. On February 16, 2011, Taurasi was cleared of doping allegations as the test was found to be a false positive.

In the 2011–2012 season, Taurasi played for Galatasaray, the other major team from Istanbul and Fenerbahçe's long-time rival. Taurasi joined WNBA stars Epiphanny Prince, Sylvia Fowles, Tina Charles and Ticha Penicheiro. The team ended up winning the Turkish Cup but lost to Fenerbahçe in the League Final and was eliminated in the Final Eight quarter-final round of the 2011–12 EuroLeague, again losing a decisive match to Fenerbahçe.

=== 2012–2017: UMMC Ekaterinburg ===
On May 16, 2012, Taurasi signed a contract with UMMC Ekaterinburg, joining fellow WNBA star Candace Parker. The team dominated national and international competitions, winning the 2012–13 EuroLeague, Russian Championships and Russian Cup. The UMMC team repeated their Russian Championship and Cup win in the 2013–2014 season but fell short in EuroLegue competition, losing in the semifinal game against eventual champion Galatasaray. This was repeated in the 2014–2015 season, with UMMC losing in the EuroLeague final against the Czech Republic's USK Praha, in a game where Taurasi had to sit out with a broken hand.

The injury and the resulting loss in the EuroLeague final played a large role in the decision of UMMC club to offer Taurasi a deal to skip the 2015 WNBA season to rest. Taurasi accepted the deal, giving up her WNBA title defense but returning to the Phoenix Mercury in 2016. Her decision caused a debate in the United States about salary policies in women's basketball compared to Europe and China, where women's teams receive governmental support.

In 2015–2016, Taurasi was back to UMMC, leading the team to its third (and her sixth personal) Euroleague title, while also earning MVP honors. In 2016–2017, Taurasi would once again return to UMMC, helping the team to its eleventh league championship. Though expected to play through the end of the 2017–2018 season with the team, Taurasi announced her retirement from European competition in December 2017.

== National team career ==
Taurasi was a member of the United States women's U18 team that won the gold medal at the 2000 FIBA Americas Championship in Mar Del Plata, Argentina. In the closest match of the tournament, the semifinal game against Brazil, Taurasi connected on seven of her eleven three-point attempts and ended the game with 26 points. She averaged 12.6 points per game and led the team with 5.46 assists per game. Taurasi has also earned a bronze medal as a member of the 2001 U.S. junior World Championship team, and a gold medal as a member of the 2000 U.S. Women's junior World Championship qualifying team.

On May 12, 2004, Taurasi was selected to compete at the 2004 Olympics in Athens, Greece with the United States national team. She helped Team USA capture the gold medal, defeating Australia in the championship game. Taurasi was the second leading scorer on the U.S. national basketball team at the 2006 FIBA World Championship held in São Paulo, Brazil. The Americans earned the bronze medal. She represented the United States at the 2008 Summer Games in Beijing, China, where she started all eight games and helped lead the U.S. to the gold medal.

Taurasi was invited to the USA Basketball women's national team training camp in the fall of 2009. The team selected to participate at the 2010 FIBA World Championship and the 2012 Olympics was primarily chosen from these players. At the conclusion of the training camp, the team traveled to Ekaterinburg, Russia, where they competed in the 2009 UMMC Ekaterinburg International Invitational.

Taurasi was named as one of the national team members to represent the U.S. national team in the WNBA versus USA Basketball. This game replaced the WNBA All-Star game as part of the preparation for the 2010 FIBA World Championships. Taurasi was then selected to be a member of the national team for the World Championships. Because many team members were still playing in the WNBA until just before the event, the team had only one day of practice with the entire team before leaving for Ostrava and Karlovy Vary. Even with limited practice, the team managed to win its first game against Greece by 26 points. The team continued to dominate with victory margins exceeding 20 points in the first five games. The sixth game was against undefeated Australia — Team USA jumped out to a 24-point lead and ultimately prevailed 83–75. The Americans won their next two games by over 30 points before facing the host team, the Czech Republic, in the championship game. Team USA had a five-point lead at halftime, which the Czech team then cut to three points but never got closer. The U.S. team went on to win the championship and gold medal. Taurasi led the team in scoring with 12.0 points per game and was second on the team with 23 assists.

Taurasi was selected to represent the United States at the 2012 Summer Olympics. Taurasi would win her third gold medal as the United States defeated France for the gold medal. She also played at the 2016 Olympics in Rio, earning her fourth gold medal while helping the United States overcome Spain 101–72 in the final. Taurasi was a key member of the gold medal-winning 2020 U.S. women's Olympic team in Tokyo, earning Taurasi a record fifth gold medal. Taurasi joined U.S. Olympic teammate Sue Bird as the only two Olympic basketball players of any gender to win five Olympic gold medals. At the 2024 Summer Olympics, Taurasi again won Olympic gold to become the only basketball player with six Olympic gold medals, and she joined dressage equestrian Isabell Werth of Germany and Hungarian sabre fencer Aladar Gerevich as the only Olympians to win six gold medals in the same event.

== Off the court ==
=== Personal life ===
Taurasi is married to former teammate Penny Taylor. Taylor at one time was the Phoenix Mercury Director of Player Development and Performance, After eight years of dating, Taurasi wed Taylor on May 13, 2017. She later told People magazine in an interview, "It was the most amazing and beautiful day of our lives. To be able to share our love with family and close friends meant the world to us.” On March 1, 2018, Taylor gave birth to the couple's son.

Taylor expected to give birth to the couple's second child on October 6, 2021, but the pregnancy lasted beyond the due date. After a Game 4 loss in the semifinals, Taurasi played in a winner-take-all Game 5 that would decide whether the Phoenix Mercury would play in the 2021 WNBA finals. After a Game 5 win on October 8, 2021, Taurasi had a message for Taylor in her post-game interview, closing with "Hold it in babe, I'm coming." Taurasi then flew from Las Vegas, where the game took place, back to Phoenix, arriving in time to witness Taylor give birth to their daughter—Isla Taurasi-Taylor—on October 9, 2021, at 4:24 am; with Taurasi by her side mere hours after Taurasi played the Las Vegas Aces in Las Vegas for game five of the 2021 WNBA Semifinals.

=== Endorsements ===
Taurasi has partnered with Nike for over 2 decades, since 2004. She debuted her signature sneaker, the Air Taurasi, in 2005 and then released a second edition, the Shox DT, the following year. She released a sneaker, the Nike LeBron NXXT Gen AMPD PE, on October 1, 2024, in collaboration with LeBron James. She also has a deal with BodyArmor sports drink company earning her $1.35 million, as well as deals with Coca-Cola and State Farm, Waymo, DeloitteUS, Twelvebooks, Togetherx, Cox Communications, and JBL.

=== Legal issues ===
On July 2, 2009, Taurasi was arrested for driving under the influence. She pleaded guilty on October 29 and spent a day in jail after a judge suspended nine days of her sentence.

== Career statistics ==
Legend
GP	Games played	GS	Games started	MPG	Minutes per game	RPG	Rebounds per game
APG	Assists per game	SPG	Steals per game	BPG	Blocks per game	PPG	Points per game
TO	Turnovers per game	FG%	Field-goal percentage	3P%	3-point field-goal percentage	FT%	Free-throw percentage
**Bold**	Career best	°	League leader

†	Denotes seasons in which Taurasi won a WNBA championship
*	Denotes seasons in which Taurasi won an NCAA Championship

=== College ===
NCAA statistics
Year	Team	GP	GS	MPG	FG%	3P%	FT%	RPG	APG	SPG	BPG	TO	PPG
2000–01	Connecticut	33	14	23.9	.444	.386	**.878**	3.2	3.3	1.2	0.9	2.2	10.9
2001–02*	Connecticut	**39**	**39**	29.0	**.494**	**.440**	.828	4.1	**5.3**	1.3	**1.2**	**2.1**	14.5
2002–03*	Connecticut	37	37	**31.9**	.476	.350	.815	**6.1**	4.4	0.9	**1.2**	3.1	**17.9**
2003–04*	Connecticut	35	35	**31.9**	.456	.390	.795	4.0	4.9	**1.5**	0.8	2.4	16.2
**Career**		144	125	29.3	.469	.392	.819	4.4	4.5	1.2	1.0	2.5	15.0

=== WNBA ===
==== Regular season ====
WNBA regular season statistics
Year	Team	GP	GS	MPG	FG%	3P%	FT%	RPG	APG	SPG	BPG	TO	PPG
2004	Phoenix	34	34	33.2	.416	.330	.710	4.4	3.9	1.3	0.7	2.7	17.0
2005	Phoenix	33	33	33.0	.410	.313	.801	4.2	4.5	1.2	0.8	3.4	16.0
2006	Phoenix	34	34	**33.9**	.452	.397	.781	3.6	4.1	1.2	0.8	2.3	**25.3**°
2007^{†}	Phoenix	32	32	32.0	.440	.367	.835	4.2	4.3	**1.4**	1.1	2.6	19.2
2008	Phoenix	34	34	31.9	.446	.360	.870	5.1	3.6	**1.4**	**1.4**	2.4	24.1°
2009^{†}	Phoenix	31	31	31.5	**.461**	**.407**	.894	**5.7**	3.5	1.2	**1.4**	2.7	20.4°
2010	Phoenix	31	31	32.2	.427	.374	.912	4.3	4.7	1.2	0.6	3.6	22.6°
2011	Phoenix	32	32	30.2	.449	.395	.903	3.2	3.6	0.8	0.6	3.0	21.6°
2012	Phoenix	8	8	20.8	.436	.395	.900	1.6	2.3	0.5	0.5	**1.8**	14.0
2013	Phoenix	32	32	32.3	.456	.347	.854	4.2	**6.2**	0.7	0.5	3.6	20.3
2014^{†}	Phoenix	33	33	32.3	.454	.365	.874	3.8	5.6°	0.7	0.3	2.6	16.2
2016	Phoenix	33	33	29.8	.396	.350	.909	3.0	3.9	0.9	0.1	2.6	17.8
2017	Phoenix	31	31	28.5	.400	.384	.912	3.0	2.7	0.5	0.3	2.0	17.9
2018	Phoenix	33	33	30.0	.446	.383	.925°	3.5	5.3	0.9	0.2	2.5	20.7
2019	Phoenix	6	6	21.4	.103	.042	**.944**	3.2	5.3	0.3	0.1	2.1	4.3
2020	Phoenix	19	19	28.1	.409	.365	.912	4.2	4.5	1.0	0.4	2.7	18.7
2021	Phoenix	16	16	28.4	.366	.339	.861	4.4	4.9	0.2	0.6	2.9	15.2
2022	Phoenix	31	31	31.0	.373	.337	.894	3.4	3.8	0.7	0.6	2.7	16.7
2023	Phoenix	26	26	27.3	.403	.342	.848	3.6	4.6	0.5	0.5	3.0	16.0
2024	Phoenix	**36**	**36**	29.0	.400	.333	.857	3.8	3.4	0.6	0.3	1.9	14.9
**Career**	20 years, 1 team	565	565	30.7	.425	.360	.870	3.9	4.2	0.9	0.6	2.7	18.8
**Career**	All-Star	10	8	18.9	.400	.318	1.000	3.1	4.3	0.2	0.3	1.5	9.0

==== Playoffs ====
WNBA playoff statistics
Year	Team	GP	GS	MPG	FG%	3P%	FT%	RPG	APG	SPG	BPG	TO	PPG
2007^{†}	Phoenix	9	9	33.2	.504	.390	.731	4.3	3.0	1.4	0.8	**2.0**	19.9
2009^{†}	Phoenix	**11**	**11**	32.9	.451	.365	.893	**5.9**	3.8	0.7	**1.3**	3.0	22.3°
2010	Phoenix	4	4	31.3	.473	**.542**	.818	5.3	3.8	**1.8**	0.8	4.0	18.5
2011	Phoenix	5	5	31.2	.398	.286	.929	3.2	2.4	0.2	0.2	2.4	20.0
2013	Phoenix	5	5	**37.2**	.333	.176	.950	5.2	6.0	1.6	0.2	3.0	20.8
2014^{†}	Phoenix	8	8	32.4	.492	.386	.853	4.3	5.8	1.0	0.5	3.9	21.9
2016	Phoenix	5	5	30.7	**.515**	.432	.970	2.6	2.8	0.2	0.6	**2.0**	23.6
2017	Phoenix	5	5	31.8	.409	.353	.769	2.8	3.8	0.6	0.0	**2.0**	17.2
2018	Phoenix	7	7	35.3	.477	.419	.864	4.4	6.0	0.8	0.5	2.2	21.0
2020	Phoenix	2	2	35.0	.471	.476	**1.000**	4.0	**7.5**	0.5	0.0	**2.0**	**25.5**
2021	Phoenix	10	10	30.5	.391	.347	.884	3.5	2.9	0.5	0.6	3.0	17.6
2024	Phoenix	2	2	29.5	.423	.389	**1.000**	3.0	2.5	1.0	0.0	3.5	15.5
**Career**	12 years, 1 team	73	73	32.6	.446	.374	.882	4.2	4.1	0.9	0.6	2.8	20.4

=== Euroleague ===
Euroleague statistics
Year	Team	GP	GS	MPG	FG%	3P%	FT%	RPG	APG	SPG	BPG	TO	PPG
2005–06	Dynamo Moscow	9	9	28.4	.400	.419	.625	4.1	2.2	0.9	0.3	1.9	11.4
2006–07	Spartak Moscow	12	12	29.3	.417	.438	.652	5.3	2.1	0.7	0.5	1.9	13.1
2007–08	Spartak Moscow	14	14	30.6	.485	.481	.872	4.9	4.4	1.3	**0.6**	2.4	16.8
2008–09	Spartak Moscow	17	17	31.9	.485	.457	.831	5.6	3.8	1.4	0.3	4.0	20.5
2009–10	Spartak Moscow	16	16	30.3	.496	.446	.853	**5.7**	3.8	**1.6**	0.3	2.7	**24.9**
2010–11	Fenerbahçe	7	7	**33.7**	.492	**.515**	.886	5.4	4.7	1.1	0.0	2.4	24.6
2011–12	Galatasaray	18	18	30.4	.451	.440	.900	4.4	3.1	0.9	0.2	2.9	20.9
2012–13	UMMC Ekaterinburg	17	17	29.2	.439	.394	.895	4.4	4.7	0.6	0.5	2.4	15.5
2013–14	UMMC Ekaterinburg	14	14	29.5	**.500**	.481	.789	3.3	5.0	0.8	0.1	2.4	15.0
2014–15	UMMC Ekaterinburg	14	14	31.0	.479	.511	.844	4.2	**5.9**	1.1	0.1	2.3	16.9
2015–16	UMMC Ekaterinburg	**19**	**19**	32.1	.461	.432	**.905**	5.0	4.2	0.9	0.2	2.6	20.9
2016–17	UMMC Ekaterinburg	15	15	23.6	.488	.455	.865	1.9	2.8	0.8	0.1	**1.1**	17.9
**Career**		172	172	30.0	.466	.455	.826	4.5	3.9	1.0	0.2	2.4	18.2

== Filmography ==
Film roles
Year	Title	Role	Notes
2021	Space Jam: A New Legacy	Herself, Voice of White Mamba	

== See also ==
- UConn Huskies women's basketball statistical leaders
- 2003–04 Connecticut Huskies women's basketball team
- List of athletes with the most appearances at Olympic Games
- List of WNBA career 3-point scoring leaders
- List of WNBA career assists leaders
- List of WNBA career blocks leaders
- List of WNBA career free throw percentage leaders
- List of WNBA career free throw scoring leaders
- List of WNBA career games played leaders
- List of WNBA career minutes played leaders
- List of WNBA career scoring leaders
- List of WNBA career steals leaders
- List of WNBA career turnovers leaders
- List of WNBA season scoring leaders
