= List of WNBA career games played leaders =

This is a list of basketball players who are the leaders in career regular season games played in the Women's National Basketball Association (WNBA).

== Games played ==
Statistics accurate as of the 2026 season.

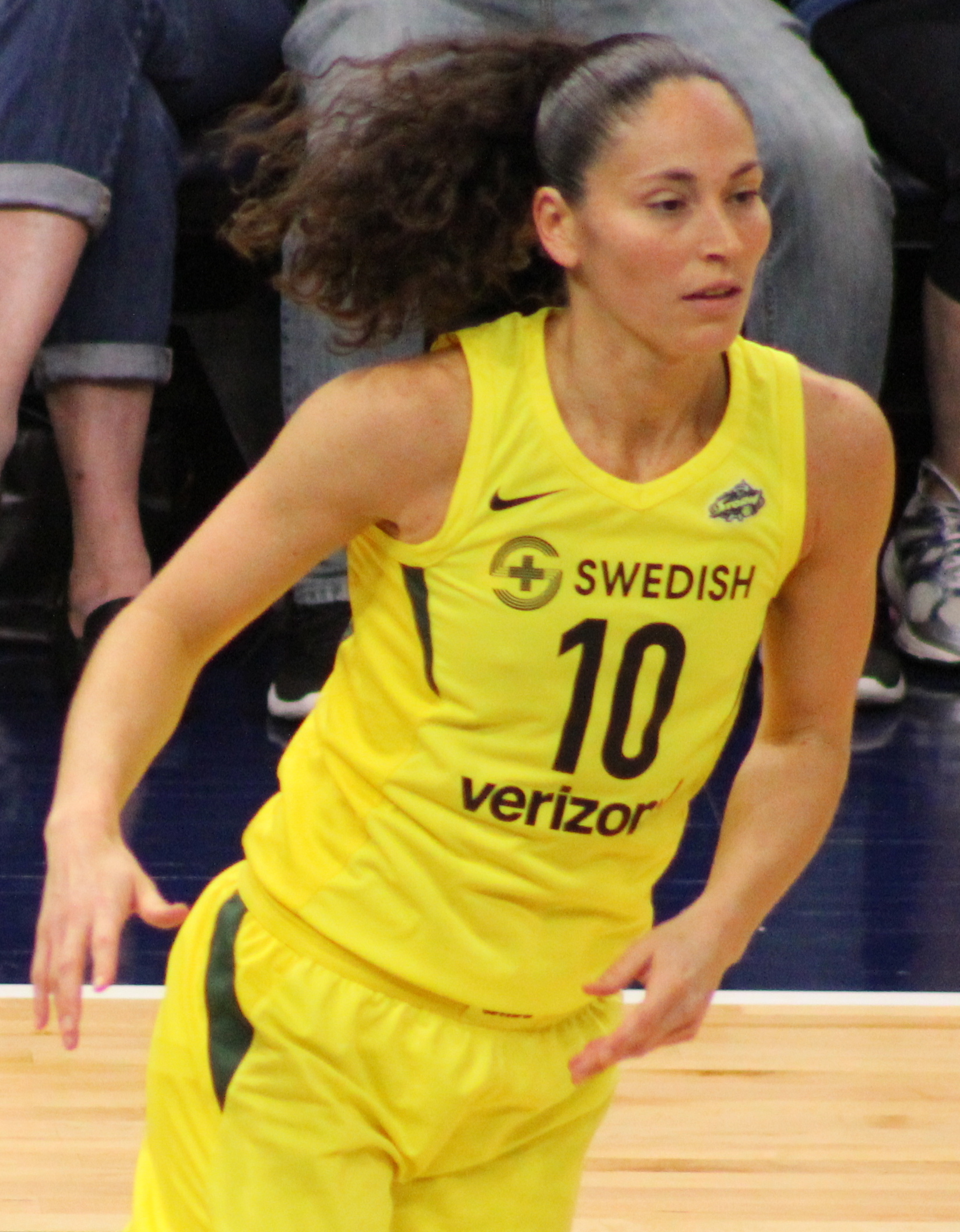
Sue Bird has played the most regular season games in WNBA history.

Key
^	Active WNBA player
*	Inducted into the Naismith Memorial Basketball Hall of Fame
†	Not yet eligible for Hall of Fame consideration (Note: A player is not eligible for induction into the Naismith Memorial Basketball Hall of Fame until he has been fully retired for two calendar years.)
§	1st time eligible for Hall of Fame in 2026

Career leaders
Rank	Player	Pos	Team(s) (Note: Listed in order of the player's career. Repeated teams indicate multiple stints with that team.)	Seasons	Games played
1	Sue Bird*	PG	Seattle Storm (2002–2022) (Note: Bird did not play the 2013 season and 2019 season because of knee surgery.)	21	580
2	DeWanna Bonner^	SG/SF	Phoenix Mercury (2009–2019, 2025–2026); Connecticut Sun (2020–2024); Indiana Fever (2025); Atlanta Dream (2026–present)	17	577
3	Diana Taurasi^{†}	G	Phoenix Mercury (2004–2024) (Note: Taurasi did not play the 2015 season at the request of her Russian Premier League team, UMMC Ekaterinburg.)	20	565
4	DeLisha Milton-Jones	SF/PF	Los Angeles Sparks (1999–2004, 2008–2012); Washington Mystics (2005–2007); San Antonio Silver Stars (2013); New York Liberty (2013–2014); Atlanta Dream (2014–2015)	19	499
5	Tina Thompson*	SF/PF	Houston Comets (1997–2008); Los Angeles Sparks (2009–2011); Seattle Storm (2012–2013)	17	496
6	Candice Dupree	PF	Chicago Sky (2006–2009); Phoenix Mercury (2010–2016); Indiana Fever (2017–2020); Seattle Storm (2021); Atlanta Dream (2021)	17	494
7	Katie Smith*	SG/SF	Minnesota Lynx (1999–2005); Detroit Shock (2006–2009); Washington Mystics (2010); Seattle Storm (2011–2013); New York Liberty (2013)	16	482
8	Lindsay Whalen*	PG	Connecticut Sun (2004–2009); Minnesota Lynx (2010–2018)	15	480
9	Nneka Ogwumike^	PF	Los Angeles Sparks (2012–2023, 2026–present); Seattle Storm (2024–2025)	15	480
10	Swin Cash*	SF	Detroit Shock (2002–2007); Seattle Storm (2008–2011); Chicago Sky (2012–2013); Atlanta Dream (2014); New York Liberty (2014–2016)	16	479
11	Tina Charles†	C	Connecticut Sun (2010–2013, 2025); New York Liberty (2014–2019); Washington Mystics (2021); Phoenix Mercury (2022); Seattle Storm (2022); Atlanta Dream (2024)	15	473
12	Tangela Smith	PF/C	Sacramento Monarchs (1998–2004); Charlotte Sting (2005–2006); Phoenix Mercury (2007–2010); Indiana Fever (2011); San Antonio Stars (2012)	15	463
13	Courtney Vandersloot^	PG	Chicago Sky (2011–2022, 2025–present); New York Liberty (2023–2024)	16	463
14	Tanisha Wright	SG	Seattle Storm (2005–2014); New York Liberty (2015–2016, 2019); Minnesota Lynx (2018)	14	457
15	Tamika Catchings*	SF	Indiana Fever (2002–2016)	15	457
16	Ticha Penicheiro	PG	Sacramento Monarchs (1998–2009); Los Angeles Sparks (2010–2011); Chicago Sky (2012)	15	454
17	Rebekkah Brunson	PF	Sacramento Monarchs (2004–2009); Minnesota Lynx (2010–2018)	15	453
18	Alysha Clark^	SF	Seattle Storm (2012–2020, 2025); Washington Mystics (2022, 2025); Las Vegas Aces (2023–2024); Dallas Wings (2026–present)	15	453
19	Becky Hammon*	PG	New York Liberty (1999–2006); San Antonio Stars (2007–2014)	16	450
20	Plenette Pierson	PF/C	Phoenix Mercury (2003–2005); Detroit / Tulsa Shock (2006–2010); New York Liberty (2010–2014); Tulsa Shock / Dallas Wings (2015–2016); Minnesota Lynx (2017)	17	444
21	Taj McWilliams-Franklin	PF/C	Orlando Miracle / Connecticut Sun (1999–2006); Los Angeles Sparks (2007); Washington Mystics (2008); Detroit Shock (2008–2009); New York Liberty (2010); Minnesota Lynx (2011–2012)	15	440
22	Camille Little	PF	San Antonio Silver Stars (2007); Atlanta Dream (2008); Seattle Storm (2008–2014); Connecticut Sun (2015–2016); Phoenix Mercury (2017–2019)	14	431
23	Tully Bevilaqua	PG	Cleveland Rockers (1999); Portland Fire (2000–2002); Seattle Storm (2003–2004); Indiana Fever (2005–2010); San Antonio Silver Stars (2011–2012)	14	425
24	Natasha Howard^	Power forward	Indiana Fever (2014–2015, 2025); Minnesota Lynx (2016–2017, 2026–present); Seattle Storm (2018–2020); New York Liberty (2021–2022); Dallas Wings (2023–2024)	13	424
25	Alana Beard	SG/SF	Washington Mystics (2004–2009); Los Angeles Sparks (2012–2019)	14	420

== See also ==
- List of WNBA regular season records
