= 2006 Phoenix Mercury season =

- Head coach: Paul Westhead
- Arena: U.S. Airways Center

Results
- Record: 18–16 (.529)
- Place: 5th (Western)
- Playoff finish: Did not qualify

The 2006 WNBA season was the tenth for the Phoenix Mercury. The Mercury drafted Cappie Pondexter with the 2nd pick overall in the WNBA Draft. They were close to qualifying for the playoffs, but lost to a tiebreaker to the Houston Comets and the Seattle Storm.

== Offseason ==
- Ann Meyers-Drysdale was hired as the Phoenix Mercury general manager.

=== WNBA draft ===
Pick	Player	Nationality	School
2nd	Cappie Pondexter		
18th	Liz Shimek		
31st	Jamie Carey		

== Regular season ==
=== Season standings ===
Western Conference	W	L	PCT	GB	Home	Road	Conf.
Los Angeles Sparks ^{x}	25	9	.735	–	15–2	10–7	15–5
Sacramento Monarchs ^{x}	21	13	.618	4.0	14–3	7–10	10–10
Houston Comets ^{x}	18	16	.529	7.0	12–5	6–11	11–9
Seattle Storm ^{x}	18	16	.529	7.0	9–8	9–8	10–10
Phoenix Mercury ^{o}	18	16	.529	7.0	10–7	8–9	8–12
San Antonio Silver Stars ^{o}	13	21	.382	12.0	6–11	7–10	10–10
Minnesota Lynx ^{o}	10	24	.294	15.0	8–9	2–15	6–14

=== Season schedule ===
Date	Opponent	Score	Result	Record
May 20	at Sacramento	78-105	Loss	0-1
May 25	vs Seattle	81-94	Loss	0-2
May 31	vs San Antonio	76-82	Loss	0-3
June 2	at Seattle	87-97	Loss	0-4
June 6	vs Sacramento	90-76	Win	1-4
June 9	vs Detroit	93-79	Win	2-4
June 13	at Los Angeles	84-98	Loss	2-5
June 16	vs Connecticut	91-86	Win	3-5
June 18	at Minnesota	82-94	Loss	3-6
June 21	at Seattle	87-80	Win	4-6
June 23	vs Indiana	73-83	Loss	4-7
June 25	vs Chicago	90-77	Win	5-7
June 28	vs Minnesota	81-78	Win	6-7
June 30	at Los Angeles	83-85	Loss	6-8
July 2	vs Washington	78-81	Loss	6-9
July 6	at Detroit	91-76	Win	7-9
July 8	at Connecticut	77-82	Loss	7-10
July 9	at New York	94-88 (OT)	Win	8-10
July 14	vs Los Angeles	85-95	Loss	8-11
July 16	vs New York	80-70	Win	9-11
July 18	at Indiana	65-71	Loss	9-12
July 19	at Washington	96-83	Win	10-12
July 22	at Charlotte	78-74	Win	11-12
July 25	vs Seattle	85-91	Loss	11-13
July 27	at Houston	95-98	Loss	11-14
July 28	at San Antonio	96-98	Loss	11-15
July 30	vs Houston	80-82	Loss	11-16
August 1	at Chicago	90-70	Win	12-16
August 3	vs Charlotte	112-84	Win	13-16
August 5	vs Los Angeles	96-80	Win	14-16
August 8	vs Minnesota	99-68	Win	15-16
August 10	at Houston	111-110 (3OT)	Win	16-16
August 12	at San Antonio	95-93	Win	17-16
August 13	vs Sacramento	81-71	Win	18-16

== Player stats ==
Note: GP= Games played; FG = Field Goals; MIN= Minutes; REB= Rebounds; AST= Assists; STL = Steals; BLK = Blocks; PTS = Points

Player	GP	MIN	FG	REB	AST	STL	BLK	PTS
Diana Taurasi	34	1152	298	122	139	42	27	860
Cappie Pondexter	32	1067	219	107	98	37	4	624
Kelly Miller								296
Penny Taylor								277
Kamila Vodichkova								272
Jennifer Lacy								162
Kristen Rasmussen								146
Belinda Snell								100
Jennifer Derevjanik								96
Crystal Smith								60
Tamicha Jackson								24
Ann Strother								16
Bridget Pettis								14
Sandora Irvin								7
Mandisa Stevenson								3
Kayte Christensen								3

== Awards and honors ==
- 8/14/06: Diana Taurasi, WNBA Player of the Week
- 7/10/06: Diana Taurasi, WNBA Player of the Week
- 6/12/06: Cappie Pondexter, WNBA Player of the Week
