= Brummel =

Brummel is a surname. Notable people with the surname include:

- Beau Brummel (1778–1840), important figure in Regency England and for many years the arbiter of men's fashion
- Daniel Brummel (born 1981), American singer-songwriter, composer, producer, and multi-instrumentalist
- Lisa Brummel (born 1959), American businesswoman, Executive Vice President of Human Resources for Microsoft
- Marije Brummel (born 1985), Dutch football coach and former defensive midfielder
- Tony Brummel, founder of Victory Records, a Chicago-based record label

== See also ==
- Brummel & Brown, a butter spread introduced by Van den Bergh Foods (now Unilever) in 1994
- Brummel hook, a clip for joining a flag or ensign to flag halyards so that the flag can be hoisted
- Brummell (disambiguation)
- Brumel
- Bromell
- Brommella
- Broomella
