= Seattle Storm =

Women's National Basketball Association team in Seattle, Washington

- 2026 Seattle Storm season
- Conference: Western
- Leagues: WNBA
- Founded: 2000
- History: Seattle Storm; 2000–present
- Arena: Climate Pledge Arena
- Location: Seattle, Washington
- Team colors: Thunder green, lightning yellow, bolt green
- Main sponsor: Swedish Health Services
- General manager: Talisa Rhea
- Head coach: Sonia Raman
- Assistants: Natalie Achonwa; Michael Joiner; Jarell Christian
- Ownership: Dawn Trudeau; Lisa Brummel; Ginny Gilder; Sue Bird; Bobby Wagner
- Championships: 4 (2004, 2010, 2018, 2020)
- Conference titles: 2 (2004, 2010) (Note: The WNBA awarded conference championships to the winners of the Conference Finals in the playoffs from 1998 to 2015.)
- Commissioner's Cup titles: 1 (2021)
- Retired numbers: 2 (10, 15)
- Website: storm.wnba.com
Heroine	Explorer	Rebel

The Seattle Storm are an American professional basketball team based in Seattle. The Storm compete in the Women's National Basketball Association (WNBA) as a member of the Western Conference. The team was founded by Ginger Ackerley and her husband Barry ahead of the 2000 season. The team is currently owned by Force 10 Hoops LLC, which is composed of Seattle businesswomen Dawn Trudeau, Lisa Brummel, and Ginny Gilder, along with former player Sue Bird and NFL player Bobby Wagner.

The Storm have qualified for the WNBA playoffs in 19 of their 25 seasons in Seattle. The franchise has been home to many high-quality players such as former UConn stars Sue Bird, Swin Cash, and Breanna Stewart; 2004 Finals MVP Betty Lennox; and Australian power forward Lauren Jackson, a three-time league MVP. The Storm are four-time WNBA Champions, with victories in 2004, 2010, 2018, and 2020. They are one of two teams who have never lost a WNBA Finals, the original Houston Comets being the other, they also share the record for most WNBA titles with the Comets and the Minnesota Lynx.

The team cultivates a family-friendly fan environment at home games by having an all-kid dance squad, which leads young fans in a conga line on the court during time-outs, to the music of "C'mon N' Ride It (The Train)" by the Quad City DJ's. Named for the rainy weather of Seattle, the team uses many weather-related icons: the team mascot is Doppler, a maroon-furred creature with a cup anemometer on its head; the theme song for Storm home games is AC/DC's "Thunderstruck"; and its newsletter is called Stormwatch.

The Storm were the sister team of the Seattle SuperSonics of the NBA until February 28, 2008, when the team was sold to Force 10 Hoops LLC.

== History ==
=== A gloomy start (2000–2001) ===
The Storm's predecessor was the Seattle Reign, a charter member of the American Basketball League (ABL), operating from 1996 through December 1998, when the league folded. Luckier than most localities that had an ABL team, Seattle was quickly awarded a WNBA franchise and began to play less than two years later. The league held an expansion draft for the Storm, Indiana Fever, Portland Fire, and Miami Sol on December 15, 1999.

The Seattle Storm would tip off their first season (the 2000 WNBA season) in typical expansion fashion. Coached by Lin Dunn and led by guard Edna Campbell and Czech center Kamila Vodichkova, the team finished with a 6–26 record. The low record, however, allowed the Storm to draft a 19-year-old Australian standout Lauren Jackson. Though Seattle did not make the playoffs in the 2001 season, Jackson's impressive rookie performance provided a solid foundation for the franchise to build on.

=== Sue Bird's arrival and the road to the WNBA Finals (2002–2004) ===
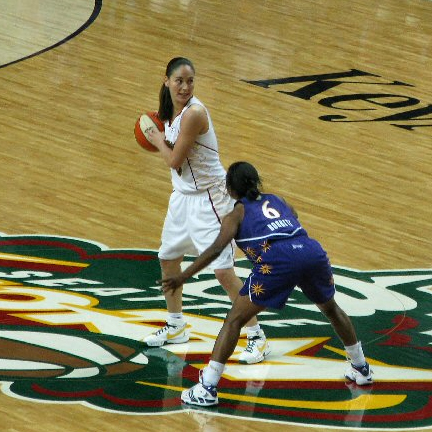
Sue Bird, on offense

In the 2002 draft, the Storm drafted UConn star Sue Bird, filling the Storm's gap at the point guard position. With Bird's playmaking ability and Jackson's scoring and rebounding, the team made the playoffs for the first time in 2002 but were swept by the Los Angeles Sparks.

Coach Anne Donovan was hired for the 2003 campaign. In Donovan's first year, Jackson would win the WNBA Most Valuable Player Award, but the team had a disappointing season (with Bird injured for much of the year), and the Storm missed the playoffs.

The 2004 Storm posted a then franchise-best 20–14 record. In the playoffs, the Storm made quick work of the Minnesota Lynx, sweeping them in the first round. The Storm then squared off against an up-and-coming Sacramento Monarchs team in the West Finals. The Storm would emerge victorious, winning the series 2–1. In the WNBA Finals, the Storm would finish off the season as champions, defeating the Connecticut Sun 2 games to 1. Betty Lennox was named MVP of the Finals. The win made Anne Donovan the first female head coach in WNBA history to win the WNBA Championship.

=== A consistent postseason contender (2005–2009) ===
Key players from the Storm's championship season were not on the team in 2005. Vodichkova, Tully Bevilaqua, and Sheri Sam moved on to other teams. Also, the pre-season injury of Australian star and new acquisition Jessica Bibby hampered the team's 2005 season. While they matched their 2004 record and made the playoffs, the Storm's title defense was stopped in the first round by the Houston Comets, 2 games to 1.

In 2006, the Storm would finish 18–16, good enough to make the playoffs. The Storm put up a good fight in the first round against the Sparks but would fall short 2–1. In 2007, the Storm would finish .500 (17–17), good enough to make the playoffs in a weak Western Conference. The Storm would be quickly swept out of the playoffs by the Phoenix Mercury.

On November 30, 2007, Anne Donovan resigned as head coach, and was replaced by Brian Agler on January 9, 2008.

Although most of Seattle's major sports teams endured poor seasons during 2008, the Storm would be the only standout team in Seattle that year, posting a franchise-best 22–12 record and finishing with a 16–1 record at home, also a franchise-best. But the No. 2 seeded Storm lost to the #3 Los Angeles Sparks in the first round of the playoffs in three games and ended Seattle's season at 23–14 overall.

In 2009, the Storm were 20–14 and finished second in the Western Conference for the second straight year. In the playoffs, the Storm again lost to the #3 Los Angeles Sparks in 3 games, which ended their season in the first round for the fifth consecutive season.

=== A second championship (2010) ===
In the 2010 season, the Storm was almost unstoppable with a record-tying 28 wins and 6 losses in the regular season, including a perfect 17–0 at KeyArena. This was the most home wins in the history of the WNBA.

Along the way, Lauren Jackson was named WNBA Western Conference Player of the Week five times, and Western Conference Player of the Month three times, on her way to being named WNBA MVP for the third time. Agler was also named Coach of the Year.

In the playoffs, the Storm dramatically reversed their fortunes from the previous five seasons. They started with a sweep of the Sparks, the team that previously knocked them out of the playoffs every time they met. Then they swept Diana Taurasi and the Phoenix Mercury in the conference finals, and the Atlanta Dream in the WNBA Finals. With two league championships, the Storm became Seattle's most successful pro sports team by that measure.

In June 2011, President of the United States Barack Obama invited the 2010 WNBA champion Seattle Storm to the White House. He stated that the franchise provided a good example for young girls with big dreams. He praised the Storm for the community service they perform and stated that being champions did not end when they step off the court. The Storm presented the President with a championship ring.

=== Postseason pains (2011–2014) ===
With the same lineup as the previous year, the Storm had much expectation for the 2011 WNBA season. But right in the second round a two-year home invincibility was broken by the Minnesota Lynx, who even left the Storm scoreless for the first seven minutes. Injuries hit multiple players, especially Lauren Jackson, who had to undergo hip surgery and missed most of the season. The regular starting five resumed play only in the last five games, but Sue Bird and Swin Cash kept the Storm competitive, finishing second in the WNBA with 21 wins and 13 losses. On the playoffs, a Mercury buzzer beater at the KeyArena eliminated the Storm in round 1.

In 2012, with Jackson absent for the early season training with the Australia national team and injuries to most of the team, including Bird, only Camille Little and Katie Smith played on all the games of the regular season. Upon her return, Jackson missed some games due to a hamstring injury but reached 6,000 points on her WNBA career playing against the San Antonio Silver Stars. The 16-18 record put the Storm fourth in the West, facing the Lynx, who posted the league's best record during the regular season, in the playoffs. While the Storm managed to force a game 3 by winning in the KeyArena at double overtime, a last-second attempt by Jackson went off the rim and the Lynx took the series-winning by just one point, 73-72.

After losing in the first round of the 2013 playoffs to the Lynx following a .500 regular season, the Storm missed the playoffs in 2014. This was the first time the Storm missed the playoffs since 2003.

=== Loyd/Stewart Era, third and fourth championships (2015–2021) ===
Following seven-year head coach & GM Brian Agler's hiring in Los Angeles, the Storm elevated President Alisha Valavanis to President & GM, and two weeks later, hired Jenny Boucek as the fourth head coach in franchise history. Valavanis and Boucek promptly got to work, trading Shekinna Stricklen and Camille Little to the Connecticut Sun for the #3 and #15 2015 WNBA draft picks, along with Renee Montgomery. Storm free agent Tanisha Wright signed with the New York Liberty, and a month later, Valavanis shipped the #15 pick to the Mystics for Quanitra Hollingsworth and the #20 pick in the 2015 WNBA Draft. Valavanis also signed Australian forward Abby Bishop that month.

Fast forward to April 2015, the month of the WNBA Draft, where Seattle now held the #1, #3, #20 and #26 picks. Days before the draft, Notre Dame guard Jewell Loyd and Minnesota center Amanda Zahui B. shook up the draft order, both forgoing NCAA eligibility and declaring for the WNBA Draft. On April 16, 2015, Seattle drafted Jewell Loyd #1, UCONN sharpshooter Kaleena Mosqueda-Lewis #3, Vicky McIntyre #20 and Nneka Enemkpali #26 in the 2015 WNBA Draft. In the 2015 WNBA season, despite missing out on the playoffs with a 10-24 record, the number-one drafted Jewell Loyd would win the Rookie of the Year Award.

After having the worst record in the WNBA, the Storm ended up with the first overall pick again using it to select Breanna Stewart from the University of Connecticut. In the 2016 WNBA season, Stewart immediately emerged as one of the young rising stars in the league, winning Rookie of the Year, averaged an impressive 18.9 ppg and broke the record for most defensive rebounds in a regular season. Loyd would statistically improve, averaging 16.5 ppg, birthing a new, young dynamic tandem as the "Next Great Storm Duo" after Sue Bird and Lauren Jackson. This would lead the Storm back into playoff contention as they finished as the 6th seed with a 16-18 record under the league's new playoff format, but would lose to the Atlanta Dream in the first round elimination game.

In the 2017 season, both Loyd and Stewart continued to get better and lead the Storm into playoff contention. Loyd averaged 17.7 ppg and Stewart 19.9 ppg. Stewart would become an all-star for the first time in her career and was one of two all-stars representing the Storm in the 2017 WNBA All-Star Game along with Sue Bird. The Storm finished as the 8th seed with a 15-19 record but would lose yet again in the first round elimination game by the Phoenix Mercury.

In the 2018 season, the Storm would elevate from a mediocre playoff team to a title contender. In the offseason, they made some slight changes to the roster. They traded for Natasha Howard and drafted Jordin Canada. Bird, Loyd, and Stewart were all voted into the 2018 WNBA All-Star Game, creating a "big three" on the Storm's roster. Bird also broke records in 2018 by becoming the franchise leader in scoring and the league's all-time regular-season assists leader. With Bird's leadership and the continued development of Loyd and Stewart, the Storm finished 26-8 with the number 1 seed headed into the WNBA Playoffs. They would receive a double-bye to the semi-finals. Stewart who averaged 20.0 ppg and 8.8 RPG won the 2018 Most Valuable Player award. They faced the Phoenix Mercury in the semi-finals where Stewart averaged 24.0 ppg and Loyd added 11.0 ppg. They would defeat the Mercury in a hard-fought five-game series, advancing to the WNBA Finals for the first time since 2010. In the Finals, the Storm would sweep their opponent, the Washington Mystics, winning their first championship in eight years, Stewart was named Finals MVP.

Even before the season started, 2019 was a year defined by health issues for the Storm. On April 15, Stewart ruptured her Achilles tendon playing in a Euroleague game for Dynamo Kursk when she collided with Brittney Griner, putting her out for the entire 2019 season. Four days later, head coach Dan Hughes was diagnosed with a cancerous tumor in his colon; he had it removed in May and missed the entire season, with assistant Gary Kloppenburg taking over in an interim role Later that month, after the Storm finished their preseason schedule, it was announced that Bird would have to undergo knee surgery, sidelining her too for the year.

With Bird out, Canada stepped into the starting point guard role, finishing 2019 third in the WNBA in assists per game (5.5) and second in steals per game (2.3). Meanwhile, without Stewart and with Loyd missing seven games with an injury of her own, Howard became the focal point of the Seattle offense, scoring a career-high 18.1 points per game. The shorthanded Storm finished the season 18-16, earning the No. 6 seed in the 2019 WNBA playoffs. Seattle won its first-round matchup against the Minnesota Lynx, 84-74, and then lost in the second round to the Los Angeles Sparks, 92-69.

The 2020 WNBA season was atypical, played entirely inside Bradenton, Florida's IMG Academy, dubbed the "wubble", the WNBA's version of the NBA's Bubble. The Storm entered the wubble with Bird and Stewart back, but without head coach Dan Hughes, whose cancer diagnosis made him a health risk. Bird missed several games with a left knee bone bruise, but came back for the playoffs, in which the Storm didn't lose a single game. The Storm closed out the top-ranked Las Vegas Aces in three games en route to their fourth championship, with Stewart again named Finals MVP. The Storm remained at Angel of the Winds Arena in Everett for the 2021 season with limited capacity due to COVID guidelines. In the 2021 season the Storm won the inaugural WNBA Commissioner's Cup after defeating the Connecticut Sun 79-57 in the championship game.

=== Move to Climate Pledge Arena (2022–present) ===
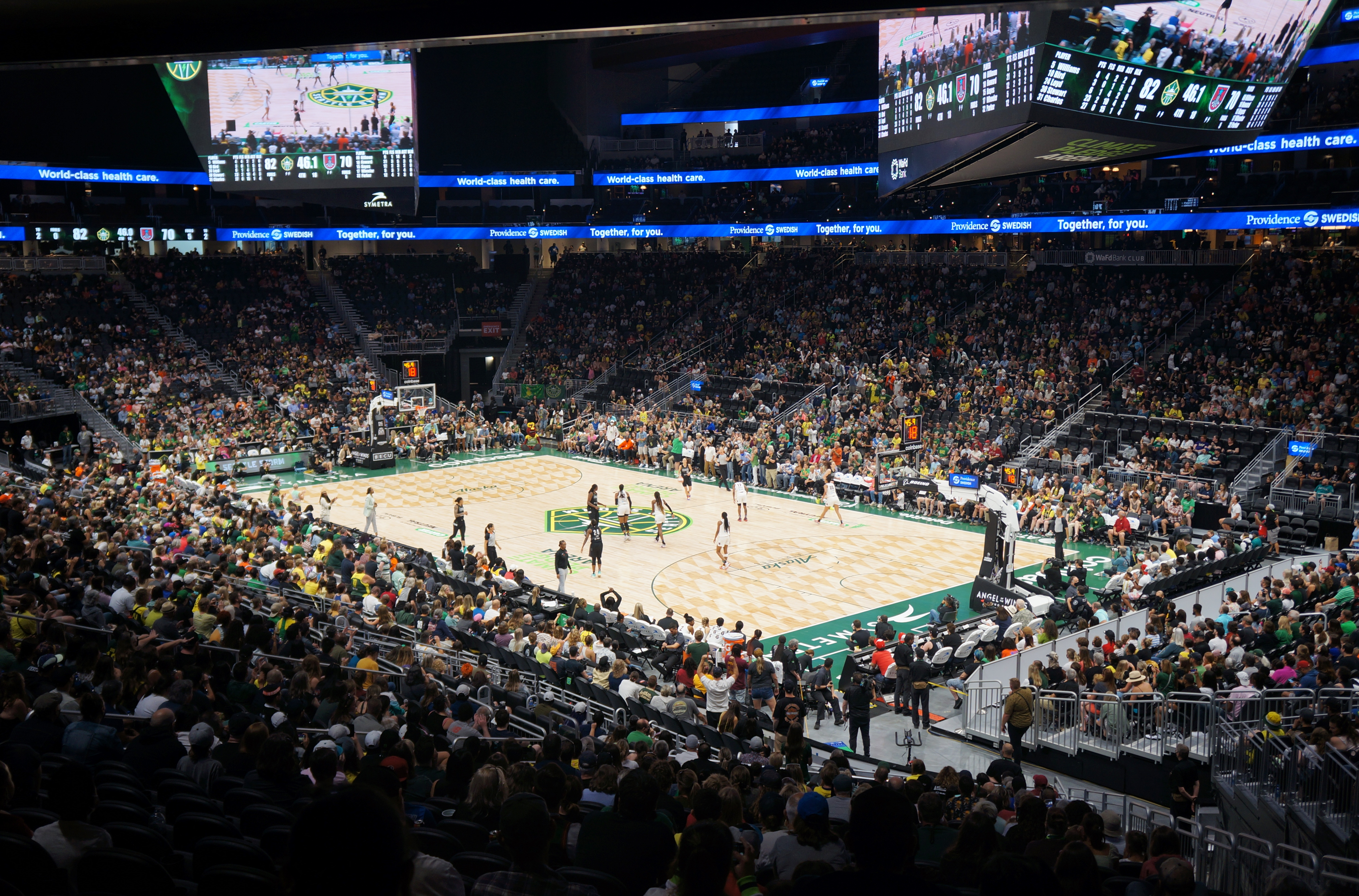
A 2022 regular season game at Climate Pledge Arena

The Storm moved to their new home at Climate Pledge Arena for the 2022 season and played their regular season game there on May 6, 2022. Sue Bird announced that she would retire at the end of the season and drew a franchise record crowd of 18,100 spectators for her last regular season game. The record was broken during a regular season win against the Indiana Fever on May 22, 2024, with 18,343 in attendance.

On July 23, 2025, NFL player Bobby Wagner joined the ownership group. On August 15, 2025, the Storm defeated the Atlanta Dream at Rogers Arena in Vancouver, Canada, in front of 15,892 spectators. It was the first WNBA regular season game played outside the United States. After the team were eliminated in the first round of the playoffs, Noelle Quinn left as head coach and was replaced by Sonia Raman in October 2025. The Storm ended the 2026 season with 8 wins and 36 losses, setting a record for the worst year in franchise history and the most single-season losses for a WNBA team.

== Name, logo and team colors ==
The Storm's name was chosen because of Seattle's reputation as a rainy city, as well as the aggressive nature implicit in the name. Though the team conducted an exhaustive trademark search for options, Storm was always their preferred choice. The name had once been trademarked by an amateur soccer club, FC Seattle Storm, in the mid-1980s, but by 2000 it was free for the WNBA to take ownership. The team had planned a formal announcement, along with a presentation of the logo and official team colors, at a January 2000 gala event for the inaugural season ticket holders. However, a Miami newspaper revealed the name two weeks early while announcing all four of that season's expansion franchises.

=== Logo ===
The original logo featured a rounded, stylized silhouette of the Space Needle, an iconic Seattle landmark, set against the backdrop of a green storm cloud. In dynamic font and fashion, the team name stretches in an angled rise from left to right. Pointed jags meant to evoke lightning bolts streak through the team name from right to left. A basketball orbits the Space Needle through the cloud.

In January 2016, the team revealed a branding update that eliminated the use of red. The team logos retained the same overall design, but used the simplified color scheme.

An alternate logo, which placed the S from the Storm wordmark on a green oval, was used on the team's jerseys on and off until 2020 in place of the more complicated primary mark.

In March 2021, the team released an entirely new logo and updated color scheme. The Space Needle, depicted in a new, more minimalist style, is interlinked with the ribs of a basketball and incorporates a small lightning bolt into the tower. The logo has a pointed shape, meant to evoke Mount Rainier. A sleeker modern font and the new color scheme of dark green, yellow, and bright green are used.

=== Team colors ===
Like several early WNBA teams, the Storm was owned by their NBA counterpart, the Seattle SuperSonics, and closely related to the team. Taking their cue from the Sonics' team colors at the time, known colloquially as the "wine and pine" era of the team, the Storm's original team colors were pine green, maroon red, bronze, and white. When a new ownership group led by Starbucks CEO Howard Schultz purchased the Sonics and Storm in 2001, the NBA club returned to the traditional green-and-golden yellow color scheme that the team had used for its first 28 years of existence. The Storm, however, retained their colors as a way to uniquely market the team. Following another change of ownership in 2006, the team was then sold to Force 10 Hoops LLC in 2008 when the Oklahoma City interests that owned the Sonics announced intentions to move the NBA club to Oklahoma City as the Thunder. Force 10 also retained the original colors.

The January 2016 branding update changed the official team colors. Adopting a scheme similar to their former NBA brother team, the updated colors were thunder green, a less saturated shade than before, and lightning yellow. White and thunder gray featured as accent colors.

The new 2021 design keeps the 2016–2020 colors of lightning yellow and dark thunder green and replaces gray with the bright bolt green.

== Off-court activity ==
=== Ownership ===
After disagreements between the Basketball Club of Seattle (the former owners of the Sonics and Storm) and the city of Seattle about renovating the KeyArena, the Seattle SuperSonics and the Seattle Storm were sold to an Oklahoma City group led by Clay Bennett on July 18, 2006. Bennett said the Sonics and Storm would move to Oklahoma City at some point after the 2007–08 NBA season unless an arena for the Sonics was approved by Seattle leaders before October 31, 2007. During this period of uncertainty, the Storm announced that they would play their 2008 WNBA season in Seattle at KeyArena; the team had a lease there through the end of the 2008 season.

On January 8, 2008, Bennett sold the team to a group of four Seattle women called Force 10 Hoops, LLC for $10 million. The group had formed in 2006 and began negotiations with Bennett in February 2007 after the Washington State Legislature voted against public financing for a new arena. The sale received unanimous approval from the WNBA Board of Governors on February 28. This kept the team in Seattle and disconnected it from the Sonics, who moved to Oklahoma City in July 2008. Force 10 Hoops later took over hosting of the Pac-12 Conference women's basketball tournament and other basketball events in the city. In 2018, the company became the ticketing and service operator of Seattle Reign FC of the National Women's Soccer League and a consultant for the Seattle Seawolves of Major League Rugby.

Minority co-owner Celeste Keaton was suspended and fined by the WNBA after an incident in July 2026 during a game against the Indiana Fever. She allegedly confronted two teenage fans who had apparel supporting Sophie Cunningham, who had spoken out against transgender players in women's sports. The Storm later released an apology.

=== Uniform sponsorship ===
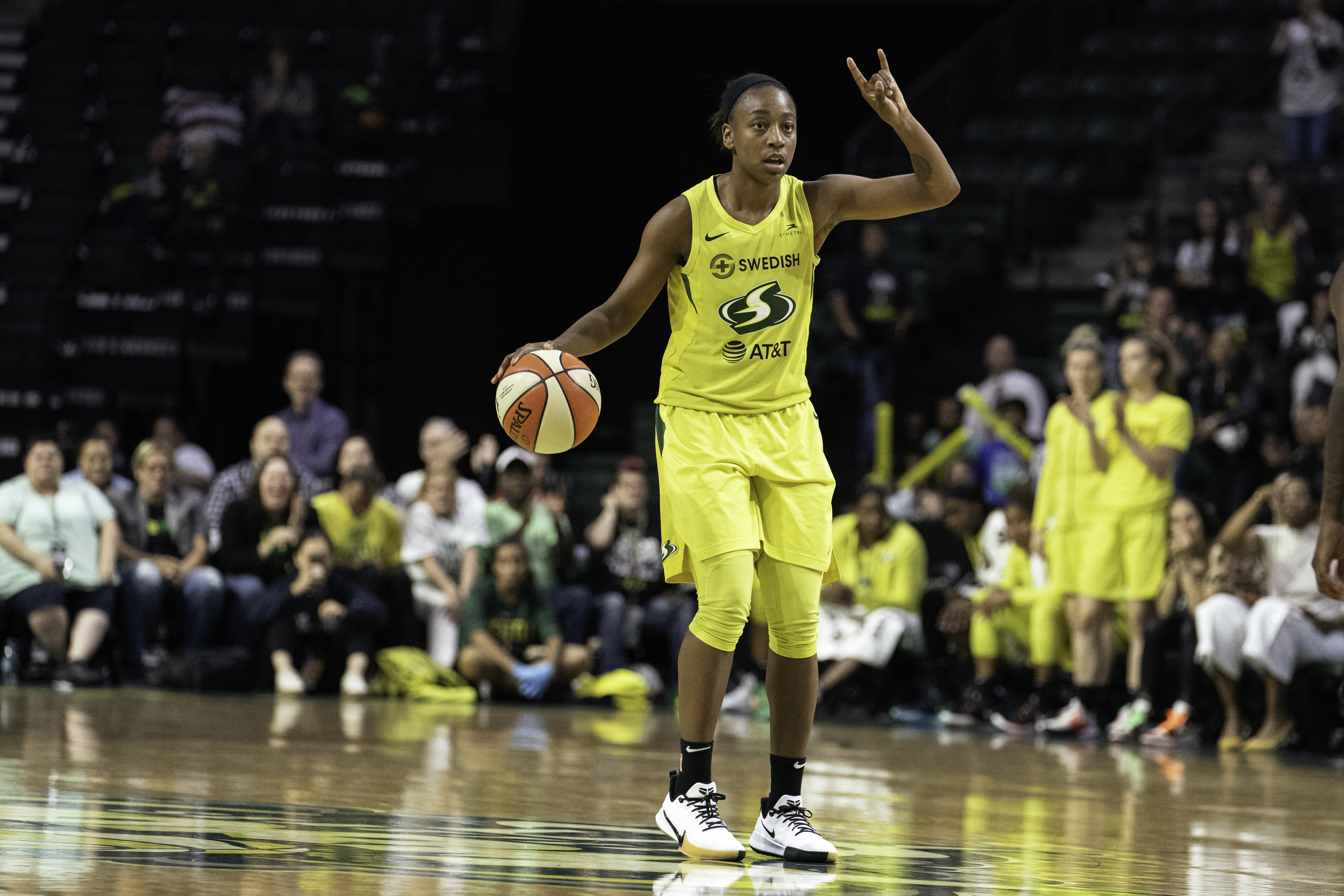
Seattle Storm player Jewell Loyd during a game against the Minnesota Lynx

On April 21, 2010, the Storm and the WNBA announced a sponsor agreement with Bing, a search engine from Microsoft, to place the company's logo on their jerseys for the 2010 season. The Bing sponsorship ended after the 2013 season, and the Storm played without a sponsor for two seasons, before signing a new uniform deal with Swedish Medical Center for the 2016 season.

=== Temporary move to the University of Washington ===
With Climate Pledge Arena to be closed during its renovation into a venue suitable for the Seattle Kraken of the National Hockey League, the Storm were forced to seek a temporary venue for their 2019 season. After considering two suburban venues, ShoWare Center in Kent and Angel of the Winds Arena in Everett, the team announced in August 2018 that its primary home in 2019 would be in the city of Seattle at the University of Washington's Alaska Airlines Arena. While the arena was the Storm's primary home during the renovation, there was no guarantee of its availability for Storm playoff games, and some home games were planned to be played at other venues in the region, such as Tacoma Dome, if necessary. Since Washington's arena lacks air conditioning, and the WNBA requires that all games be played in air-conditioned venues, portable air conditioning units were used during Storm games. The team later announced that five of its 17 regular-season home games in 2019, including the home opener, would be at Angel of the Winds Arena. The 2020 season saw the Storm play their games in Bradenton, Florida, due to the COVID-19 pandemic.

=== Training facility ===
The Storm's training facility from 2008 to 2008 was the Furtado Center, which it shared with the SuperSonics and was located adjacent to the Seattle Center campus. After the SuperSonics moved, the Furtado Center was demolished; the Storm moved to the Royal Brougham Pavilion at Seattle Pacific University. The team announced plans for a dedicated training facility in the Interbay neighborhood in May 2022, pending city approval. Construction began in March 2023 and the facility opened in April 2024. ZGF Architects designed the facility with a women-led team and Sellen Construction was the general contractor for the project.

The Seattle Storm Center for Basketball Performance serves as the team's headquarters and training facility. It comprises a two-story building with 53,000 square feet (4,900 m^{2}) of space with two full-size basketball courts and two half-courts on the lower level and office spaces, a gymnasium, kitchen, and other facilities on the upper level. A rooftop solar array is also planned as part of the $64 million project. It is the first dedicated training facility built for a WNBA team; the Las Vegas Aces' headquarters opened in 2022 in a renovated space.

== Season-by-season records ==
Season	Team	Conference		Regular season			Playoff Results	Head coach
Season	Team	Conference		W	L	PCT	Playoff Results	Head coach
Seattle Storm
2000	2000	West	8th	6	26	.188	Did not qualify	Lin Dunn
2001	2001	West	8th	10	22	.313	Did not qualify	Lin Dunn
2002	2002	West	4th	17	15	.531	Lost Conference Semifinals (Los Angeles, 0–2)	Lin Dunn
2003	2003	West	5th	18	16	.529	Did not qualify	Anne Donovan
2004	2004	West	2nd	20	14	.588	Won Conference Semifinals (Minnesota, 2–0); Won Conference Finals (Sacramento, 2–1); Won WNBA Finals (Connecticut, 2–1)	Anne Donovan
2005	2005	West	2nd	20	14	.588	Lost Conference Semifinals (Houston, 1–2)	Anne Donovan
2006	2006	West	4th	18	16	.529	Lost Conference Semifinals (Los Angeles, 1–2)	Anne Donovan
2007	2007	West	4th	17	17	.500	Lost Conference Semifinals (Phoenix, 0–2)	Anne Donovan
2008	2008	West	2nd	22	12	.647	Lost Conference Semifinals (Los Angeles, 1–2)	Brian Agler
2009	2009	West	2nd	20	14	.588	Lost Conference Semifinals (Los Angeles, 1–2)	Brian Agler
2010	2010	West	1st	28	6	.824	Won Conference Semifinals (Los Angeles, 2–0); Won Conference Finals (Phoenix, 2–0); Won WNBA Finals (Atlanta, 3–0)	Brian Agler
2011	2011	West	2nd	21	13	.618	Lost Conference Semifinals (Phoenix, 1–2)	Brian Agler
2012	2012	West	4th	16	18	.471	Lost Conference Semifinals (Minnesota, 1–2)	Brian Agler
2013	2013	West	4th	17	17	.500	Lost Conference Semifinals (Minnesota, 0–2)	Brian Agler
2014	2014	West	6th	12	22	.353	Did not qualify	Brian Agler
2015	2015	West	5th	10	24	.294	Did not qualify	Jenny Boucek
2016	2016	West	3rd	16	18	.471	Lost First Round (Atlanta, 0–1)	Jenny Boucek
2017	2017	West	5th	15	19	.441	Lost First Round (Phoenix, 0–1)	Jenny Boucek (10–16); Gary Kloppenburg (5–3)
2018	2018	West	1st	26	8	.765	Won Semifinals (Phoenix, 3–2); Won WNBA Finals (Washington, 3–0)	Dan Hughes
2019	2019	West	6th	18	16	.529	Won First Round (Minnesota, 1–0); Lost Second Round (Los Angeles, 0–1)	Dan Hughes
2020	2020	West	2nd	18	4	.818	Won Semifinals (Minnesota, 3–0); Won WNBA Finals (Las Vegas, 3–0)	Gary Kloppenburg
2021	2021	West	3rd	21	11	.656	Lost Second Round (Phoenix, 0–1)	Dan Hughes (5–1); Noelle Quinn (16–10)
2022	2022	West	2nd	22	14	.611	Won First Round (Washington 2–0); Lost Semifinals (Las Vegas, 1–3)	Noelle Quinn
2023	2023	West	5th	11	29	.275	Did not qualify	Noelle Quinn
2024	2024	West	3rd	25	15	.625	Lost First Round (Las Vegas, 0–2)	Noelle Quinn
2025	2025	West	4th	23	21	.523	Lost First Round (Las Vegas, 1–2)	Noelle Quinn
2026	2026	West	8th	8	36	.182	Did not qualify	Sonia Raman
Regular season				475	457	.510	2 Conference Championships	
Playoffs				36	33	.522	4 WNBA Championships	

== Players ==
=== Current roster ===
Seattle Storm roster
Players
Coaches

Pos.	No.	Nat.	Name	Height	Weight	DOB	From	Yrs
G	7	(United States)	Cooke, Zia	5' 9" (1.75m)	163 lb (74kg)	2001-01-09	South Carolina	2
C	31	(United States)	Dolson, Stefanie	6' 5" (1.96m)	235 lb (107kg)	1992-01-08	Connecticut	11
C	11	(Spain)	Fam, Awa	6' 4" (1.93m)		2006-06-17	Spain	R
G	2	(United States)	Hiedeman, Natisha	5' 8" (1.73m)	132 lb (60kg)	1997-02-10	Marquette	7
F	54	(United States)	Holmes, Mackenzie	6' 3" (1.91m)		2000-11-01	Indiana	1
G/F	23	(United States)	Horston, Jordan	6' 2" (1.88m)	165 lb (75kg)	2001-05-21	Tennessee	2
G	4	(United States)	Johnson, Flau'jae	5' 10" (1.78m)		2003-11-03	LSU	R
C	13	(Australia)	Magbegor, Ezi	6' 4" (1.93m)	181 lb (82kg)	1999-08-13	Australia	6
G	22	(United States)	Mair, Taina	5' 9" (1.75m)		2003-11-20	Duke	R
F/C	14	(France)	Malonga, Dominique	6' 6" (1.98m)		2005-11-16	France	1
G	5	(Australia)	Melbourne, Jade	5' 10" (1.78m)	145 lb (66kg)	2002-08-18	Australia	3
F	33	(United States)	Samuelson, Katie Lou (injured)	6' 3" (1.91m)	163 lb (74kg)	1997-06-13	Connecticut	5
G	-	(United States)	Sherrod, Jaylyn	5' 7" (1.7m)	147 lb (67kg)	2001-10-21	Colorado	2
G/F	3	(United States)	Thierry, Taylor	6' 1" (1.85m)		2003-01-08	Ohio State	1

Head coach
(United States) Sonia Raman (Tufts)
Assistant coaches
(Canada) Natalie Achonwa (Notre Dame)
(United States) Jarell Christian (Emory & Henry)
(United States) Michael Joiner (Florida State)
Athletic trainer
(United States) Laura Mancuso (Liberty)

Legend

- (C) Team captain
- (DP) Unsigned draft pick
- (FA) Free agent
- (S) Suspended
- Injured

WNBA roster page

East
ATL
CHI
CON
IND
NY
TOR
WAS
West
DAL
GS
LV
LA
MIN
PHO
POR
SEA

=== Retired numbers ===
Seattle Storm retired numbers
No.	Player	Position	Tenure	Ref.
15	Lauren Jackson	PF/C	2001–2012	
10	Sue Bird	PG	2002–2022	

== Coaches and staff ==
=== Owners ===
- Barry and Ginger Ackerley, owners of the Seattle SuperSonics (2000–2001)
- Howard Schultz, owner of the Seattle SuperSonics (2001–2006)
- Clay Bennett, owner of the Seattle SuperSonics (2007)
- Force 10 Hoops LLC, composed of Dawn Trudeau, Lisa Brummel, Ginny Gilder (2008–present)
  - Sue Bird (2024–present)
  - Bobby Wagner (2025–present)

=== Head coaches ===
Seattle Storm head coaches
Name	Start	End	Seasons	Regular season				Playoffs			
Name	Start	End	Seasons	W	L	PCT	G	W	L	PCT	G
Lin Dunn	July 22, 1999	September 3, 2002	3	33	63	.344	96	0	2	.000	2
Anne Donovan	December 18, 2002	November 30, 2007	5	93	77	.547	170	8	8	.500	16
Brian Agler	January 8, 2008	January 5, 2015	7	136	102	.571	238	11	10	.524	21
Jenny Boucek	January 20, 2015	August 10, 2017	3	36	58	.383	94	0	1	.000	1
Gary Kloppenburg (interim) (Note: Kloppenburg was named interim head coach after Boucek was fired and finished the 2017 regular season with a 5–3 record before going 0–1 in the playoffs.)	August 10, 2017	October 3, 2017	1	5	3	.625	8	0	1	.000	1
Dan Hughes	October 4, 2017	June 28, 2020	2	44	24	.647	68	7	3	.700	10
Gary Kloppenburg (Note: Kloppenburg was named head coach for the 2020 season when Hughes opted out due to health concerns.)	June 29, 2020	October 6, 2020	1	18	4	.818	22	6	0	1.000	7
Dan Hughes	October 7, 2020	May 30, 2021	1	5	1	.833	6	–	–	–	–
Noelle Quinn	May 30, 2021	September 21, 2025	5	97	89	.522	142	4	8	.333	12
Sonia Raman	October 24, 2025	Present	0	0	0	–	0	0	0	–	0

=== General managers ===
- Lin Dunn (2000–2002)
- Billy McKinney (2002–2003)
- Karen Bryant (2004–2010)
- Brian Agler (2011–2014)
- Alisha Valavanis (2015–2021)
- Talisa Rhea (2021–present)

=== Assistant coaches ===
- Kathy Anderson (2000–2001)
- Missy Bequette (2000–2001)
- Carrie Graf (2002)
- Gary Kloppenburg (2002, 2017–2019, 2021)
- Jenny Boucek (2003–2005, 2011)
- Jessie Kenlaw (2003–2006)
- Heidi VanDerveer (2006–2007)
- Shelley Patterson (2007–2009)
- Nancy Darsch (2008–2013)
- Shaquala Williams (2014)
- Rob Fodor (2015)
- Ryan Webb (2015–2017, 2021)
- Leah Drury (2016)
- Crystal Robinson (2018)
- Noelle Quinn (2019–2021)
- Perry Huang (2021–2024)
- Pokey Chatman (2022–present)
- Ebony Hoffman (2022–2025)
- Mitch Thompson (2025)
- Jarell Christian (2026–present)
- Michael Joiner (2026–present)
- Natalie Achonwa (2026–present)

== Records and statistics ==
=== Season records ===
Seattle Storm statistics
2000s
Season	Individual			Team vs Opponents		
Season	PPG	RPG	APG	PPG	RPG	FG%
2000	E. Campbell (13.9)	K. Vodichkova (4.2)	S. Henning (2.5)	56.9 vs 67.8	24.8 vs 31.5	.383 vs .452
2001	L. Jackson (15.2)	L. Jackson (6.7)	S. Henning (2.9)	60.0 vs 64.0	27.8 vs 32.9	.378 vs .430
2002	L. Jackson (17.2)	L. Jackson (6.8)	S. Bird (6.0)	68.4 vs 65.7	31.1 vs 30.3	.408 vs .431
2003	L. Jackson (21.2)	L. Jackson (9.3)	S. Bird (6.5)	70.2 vs 66.9	31.6 vs 30.6	.435 vs .414
2004	L. Jackson (20.5)	L. Jackson (6.7)	S. Bird (5.4)	71.7 vs 66.6	31.1 vs 28.9	.431 vs .428
2005	L. Jackson (17.6)	L. Jackson (9.2)	S. Bird (5.9)	73.5 vs 70.8	32.3 vs 30.0	.439 vs .412
2006	L. Jackson (19.5)	L. Jackson (7.7)	S. Bird (4.8)	77.8 vs 75.7	33.8 vs 30.3	.452 vs .424
2007	L. Jackson (23.8)	L. Jackson (9.7)	S. Bird (4.9)	80.4 vs 77.9	34.2 vs 32.2	.436 vs .425
2008	L. Jackson (20.2)	L. Jackson (7.0)	S. Bird (5.1)	73.3 vs 70.8	34.2 vs 32.1	.426 vs .398
2009	L. Jackson (19.2)	L. Jackson (7.0)	S. Bird (5.8)	74.8 vs 72.8	32.5 vs 31.7	.430 vs .410
2010s
Season	Individual			Team vs Opponents		
Season	PPG	RPG	APG	PPG	RPG	FG%
2010	L. Jackson (20.5)	L. Jackson (8.3)	S. Bird (5.8)	81.8 vs 73.9	36.3 vs 30.0	.445 vs .413
2011	S. Bird (14.7)	S. Cash (6.9)	S. Bird (4.9)	71.6 vs 69.9	31.6 vs 29.8	.438 vs .418
2012	S. Bird (12.2)	A. Wauters (5.8)	S. Bird (5.3)	71.2 vs 71.6	31.9 vs 33.7	.434 vs .391
2013	T. Thompson (14.1)	T. Thompson (5.8)	T. Wright (4.1)	70.9 vs 73.2	30.2 vs 31.5	.421 vs .435
2014	C. Langhorne; C. Little (14.1)	C. Langhorne (7.4)	S. Bird (4.0)	70.9 vs 75.3	28.5 vs 32.5	.436 vs .457
2015	C. Langhorne (11.1)	C. Langhorne (5.7)	S. Bird (5.4)	70.4 vs 76.1	30.4 vs 34.0	.434 vs .431
2016	B. Stewart (18.3)	B. Stewart (9.3)	S. Bird (5.8)	80.8 vs 80.2	31.3 vs 33.4	.457 vs .445
2017	B. Stewart (19.9)	B. Stewart (8.7)	S. Bird (6.6)	82.6 vs 82.6	31.0 vs 34.3	.437 vs .443
2018	B. Stewart (21.8)	B. Stewart (8.4)	S. Bird (7.1)	87.2 vs 79.7	35.4 vs 34.0	.468 vs .435
2019	N. Howard (18.1)	N. Howard (8.2)	J. Canada (5.2)	74.8 vs 75.1	32.0 vs 33.2	.420 vs .439
2020s
Season	Individual			Team vs Opponents		
Season	PPG	RPG	APG	PPG	RPG	FG%
2020	B. Stewart (19.7)	B. Stewart (8.3)	J. Canada (5.5)	87.5 vs 76.0	34.4 vs 34.3	.470 vs .401
2021	B. Stewart (20.3)	B. Stewart (9.5)	S. Bird (5.3)	84.8 vs 80.4	35.6 vs 35.0	.450 vs .431
2022	B. Stewart (21.8)	B. Stewart (7.6)	S. Bird (6.0)	82.5 vs 78.4	33.6 vs 36.5	.442 vs .434
2023	J. Loyd (24.7)	E. Magbegor (8.1)	G. Williams (3.8)	78.8 vs 84.5	34.9 vs 36.0	.444 vs .448
2024	J. Loyd (19.7)	E. Magbegor (8.0)	S. Diggins-Smith (6.4)	83.2 vs 78.8	34.7 vs 36.0	.435 vs .426
2025	N. Ogwumike (18.3)	N. Ogwumike (7.0)	S. Diggins (6.0)	82.1 vs 80.1	30.9 vs 36.0	.450 vs .443

=== Regular season attendance ===
- A sellout for a basketball game at Climate Pledge Arena is 18,100. For Storm games, reaching capacity of the lower bowl (13,500) is considered a sellout.
- A sellout for a basketball game at the team's main home during the renovation of Climate Pledge Arena, Alaska Airlines Arena, is 10,000. A sellout at the team's secondary home, Angel of the Winds Arena, is 8,500.

Regular season all-time attendance
Year	Average	High	Low	Sellouts	Total for year	WNBA game average
2000	8,912 (6th)	10,840	7,656	0	142,594	9,074
2001	5,954 (16th)	9,232	3,821	0	95,257	9,075
2002	6,986 (14th)	12,327	3,715	0	111,774	9,228
2003	7,109 (11th)	9,686	4,528	0	120,857	8,800
2004	7,960 (9th)	14,884	4,527	0	135,320	8,613
2005	8,906 (4th)	11,726	6,910	0	151,410	8,172
2006	8,538 (4th)	11,221	5,741	0	145,142	7,476
2007	7,974 (6th)	10,891	6,752	0	135,553	7,742
2008	8,265 (7th)	12,079	6,116	0	140,503	7,948
2009	7,874 (7th)	10,137	6,588	0	133,858	8,039
2010	8,322 (5th)	11,012	6,612	0	141,472	7,834
2011	8,659 (5th)	13,659	6,179	0	147,196	7,954
2012	7,486 (7th)	9,686	5,819	0	127,266	7,452
2013	6,981 (8th)	9,686	4,579	0	118,671	7,531
2014	6,717 (8th)	9,686	4,863	0	114,181	7,578
2015	6,516 (8th)	9,686	4,352	0	110,767	7,184
2016	7,230 (6th)	12,186	4,456	0	122,912	7,655
2017	7,704 (6th)	9,686	4,722	0	130,975	7,716
2018	8,109 (4th)	12,574	4,353	0	137,846	6,721
2019	7,562 (4th)	9,000	5,711	0	128,548	6,535
2020	Due to the COVID-19 pandemic, the season was played in Bradenton, Florida without fans.					
2021	2,607 (6th)	6,000	1,001	0	41,715	2,636
2022	10,632 (1st)	18,100	7,262	2	191,367	5,679
2023	8,929 (3rd)	13,213	6,894	0	178,581	6,615
2024	11,184 (4th)	18,343	7,202	2	223,684	9,807
2025	11,835 (5th)	18,343	9,091	1	260,377	10,986

=== All-Stars ===
Source: Basketball-Reference

Seattle Storm All-Stars
Player	App.	Years
Sue Bird	13	2002, 2003, 2005, 2006, 2007, 2009, 2011, 2014, 2015, 2017, 2018, 2021, 2022
Lauren Jackson	7	2001, 2002, 2003, 2005, 2006, 2007, 2009
Jewell Loyd	6	2018, 2019, 2021, 2022, 2023, 2024
Breanna Stewart	4	2017, 2018, 2021, 2022
Swin Cash	2	2009, 2011
Nneka Ogwumike	2	2024, 2025
Tina Thompson	1	2013
Natasha Howard	1	2019
Skylar Diggins	1	2025
Ezi Magbegor	1	2025
Gabby Williams	1	2025
Dominique Malonga	1	2026

=== Olympians ===
- 2004: Sue Bird, Lauren Jackson (AUS)
- 2008: Sue Bird, Lauren Jackson (AUS), Kelly Santos (BRA)
- 2012: Sue Bird, Lauren Jackson (AUS)
- 2016: Sue Bird, Breanna Stewart, Ramu Tokashiki (JPN)
- 2020: Sue Bird, Jewell Loyd, Breanna Stewart, Stephanie Talbot (AUS), Ezi Magbegor (AUS)
- 2024: Jewell Loyd, Ezi Magbegor (AUS), Sami Whitcomb (AUS)

=== Honors and awards ===
- 2003 Most Valuable Player: Lauren Jackson
- 2003 Peak Performer (Scoring): Lauren Jackson
- 2004 Finals MVP: Betty Lennox
- 2004 Peak Performer (Scoring): Lauren Jackson
- 2006 All-Decade Team: Sue Bird
- 2006 All-Decade Team: Lauren Jackson
- 2007 Most Valuable Player: Lauren Jackson
- 2007 Defensive Player of the Year: Lauren Jackson
- 2007 Peak Performer (Scoring): Lauren Jackson
- 2007 Peak Performer (Rebounds): Lauren Jackson
- 2009 All-Star Game MVP: Swin Cash
- 2009 Peak Performer (Assists): Sue Bird
- 2010 Most Valuable Player: Lauren Jackson
- 2010 Finals MVP: Lauren Jackson
- 2010 Coach of the Year: Brian Agler
- 2011 All-Star Game MVP: Swin Cash
- 2011 Kim Perrot Sportsmanship Award: Sue Bird
- 2015 Rookie of the Year: Jewell Loyd
- 2016 Rookie of the Year: Breanna Stewart
- 2016 Peak Performer (Assists): Sue Bird
- 2017 Kim Perrot Sportsmanship Award: Sue Bird
- 2018 Most Valuable Player: Breanna Stewart
- 2018 Most Improved Player: Natasha Howard
- 2018 Kim Perrot Sportsmanship Award: Sue Bird
- 2018 Finals MVP: Breanna Stewart
- 2019 Defensive Player of the Year: Natasha Howard
- 2020 Finals MVP: Breanna Stewart
- 2021 Commissioner's Cup MVP: Breanna Stewart
- 2022 Peak Performer (Points): Breanna Stewart
- 2023 All-Star Game MVP: Jewell Loyd
- 2023 Peak Performer (Scoring): Jewell Loyd
- 2025 Kim Perrot Sportsmanship Award: Nneka Ogwumike

== Broadcasters ==
In 2025, the Storm announced that its games not on national television would be broadcast by KOMO-TV, Seattle's ABC affiliate, and KUNS-TV, Seattle's affiliate of the CW.

From 2016 to 2024, the broadcast rights for Storm games were held by KCPQ or KZJO. Broadcasters for the Storm games are Dick Fain and Elise Woodward.

In 2022, Amazon Prime Video announced a new deal with the Seattle Storm, becoming the official streaming service of the Storm, and one of the first streamers to hold local broadcast rights with a WNBA team. Approximately 30 Storm games are available to Prime Video customers in Washington state.

Some Storm games have been broadcast nationally on ESPN, ESPN2, Ion Television(KWPX-TV), CBS(KIRO-TV), ABC(KOMO), NBC (KING-TV), Prime Video, USA, NBA TV, and NBCSN.

== Notes ==
Sporting positions
Preceded by Washington Mystics	WNBA Champions; 2020 (fourth title)	Succeeded by Chicago Sky
Preceded by Minnesota Lynx	WNBA Champions; 2018 (third title)	Succeeded by Washington Mystics
Preceded by Phoenix Mercury	WNBA Champions; 2010 (second title)	Succeeded by Minnesota Lynx
Preceded by Phoenix Mercury	WNBA Western Conference Champions; 2010 (second title)	Succeeded by Minnesota Lynx
Preceded by Detroit Shock	WNBA Champions; 2004 (first title)	Succeeded by Sacramento Monarchs
Preceded by Los Angeles Sparks	WNBA Western Conference Champions; 2004 (first title)	Succeeded by Sacramento Monarchs
