= Mitch Thompson (basketball) =

American basketball coach (born 1991)

Personal information
- Born: November 19, 1991 (age 34) Hermiston, Oregon, U.S.

Career information
- High school: Hermiston (Hermiston, Oregon)
- College: Oregon State

Career history

Coaching
- 2014–2016: Irrigon
- 2016–2018: Oregon State (assistant)
- 2019–2021: Wisconsin Herd (assistant)
- 2021–22: Mexico City Capitanes (assistant)
- 2022–2024: Mexico women's national team
- 2023–24: Stockton Kings (assistant)
- 2025: Seattle Storm (assistant)
- 2025–present: Unrivaled (assistant)

Mitchell Thompson (born November 19, 1991) is an American professional basketball coach, who most recently was an assistant coach for the Seattle Storm of the Women's National Basketball Association (WNBA).

== Early life and education ==
Thompson was born in Hermiston, Oregon, and graduated from Hermiston High School in 2010, where he was on the basketball and track and field teams.

Thompson earned a Bachelor's degree in sociology in 2016 from Oregon State University and a Master's degree in interdisciplinary studies.

== Coaching career ==
Thompson was a student manager for the Oregon State men's basketball team in 2013. He next was the head coach of the boys’ basketball team at Irrigon High School for two years, winning a state championship in 2015, the youngest coach to win a basketball state championship in Oregon, and was named Oregon Athletic Coaches Association Coach of the Year. Thompson then returned to Oregon State to become the video coordinator for the men's basketball team.

From October 2019 to January 2021, Thompson served as Player Development Coach for the Wisconsin Herd of the NBA G League. In October 2021, he was hired as an assistant coach for the Mexico City Capitanes of the NBA G League. In 2022, he was an associate head coach of the Mexican women's national basketball team and was later promoted to head coach. Thompson next served as an assistant coach for the Stockton Kings of the NBA G League during the 2023–24 season.

In March 2025, Thompson was hired as an assistant coach with the Seattle Storm. In September, the Storm confirmed that Thompson would not be retained after head coach Noelle Quinn was fired. In October 2025, Thompson became an assistant coach for Unrivaled.
