= Talisa Rhea =

American Basketball executive

Seattle Storm
- Position: General Manager
- League: WNBA

Personal information
- Born: July 7, 1989 (age 37) Juneau, Alaska, U.S.

Career information
- College: Oregon State University; Seattle University; University of Illinois Urbana-Champaign

Talisa Rhea (born July 7, 1989) is an American basketball executive who is the General Manager of the Seattle Storm of the Women's National Basketball Association (WNBA). Rhea began her career with Seattle in 2015 as a video coordinator, then director of basketball operations in 2016 and Assistant GM in 2019.

== Early life ==
Rhea attended Juneau-Douglas High School. She led her basketball team in every statistical category to Regional Championships and to the State Tournament for four years, with a State Championship as a sophomore in 2005. She was also the 2005 & 2006 Alaska 4A Player of the Year, Anchorage Daily News Player of the year and named as a Gatorade Player of the year during her tenure there. She was inducted into the Alaska High School Hall of Fame in the Class of 2018.

Following her high school career, Rhea went to Oregon State University and was a member of the Beavers' women's basketball team. She played for the Beavers from 2007–10, where she was a two-time All-Pacific-10 Honorable Mention selection and was named to the Pacific-10 All-Freshman Team following the 2007-08 season. After spending time at Oregon State, Rhea transferred to Seattle University and spent two season there.

Following her playing career, Rhea played professionally in Poland for one season in 2012-2013 with Centrum Wzgorze Poland. Following that season she enrolled at the University of Illinois, earning her Masters of Sport Management in December 2016.

== Executive career ==
=== Seattle Storm ===
In 2015, Rhea was hired by the Storm as a video coordinator. She was promoted to Director of Basketball Operations in 2016 and Assistant GM in 2019. Prior to the 2021 WNBA draft, the Storm promoted her to General Manager.

== See also ==
- Seattle Storm
