= Irrigon, Oregon =

City in Morrow County, Oregon, United States

- City
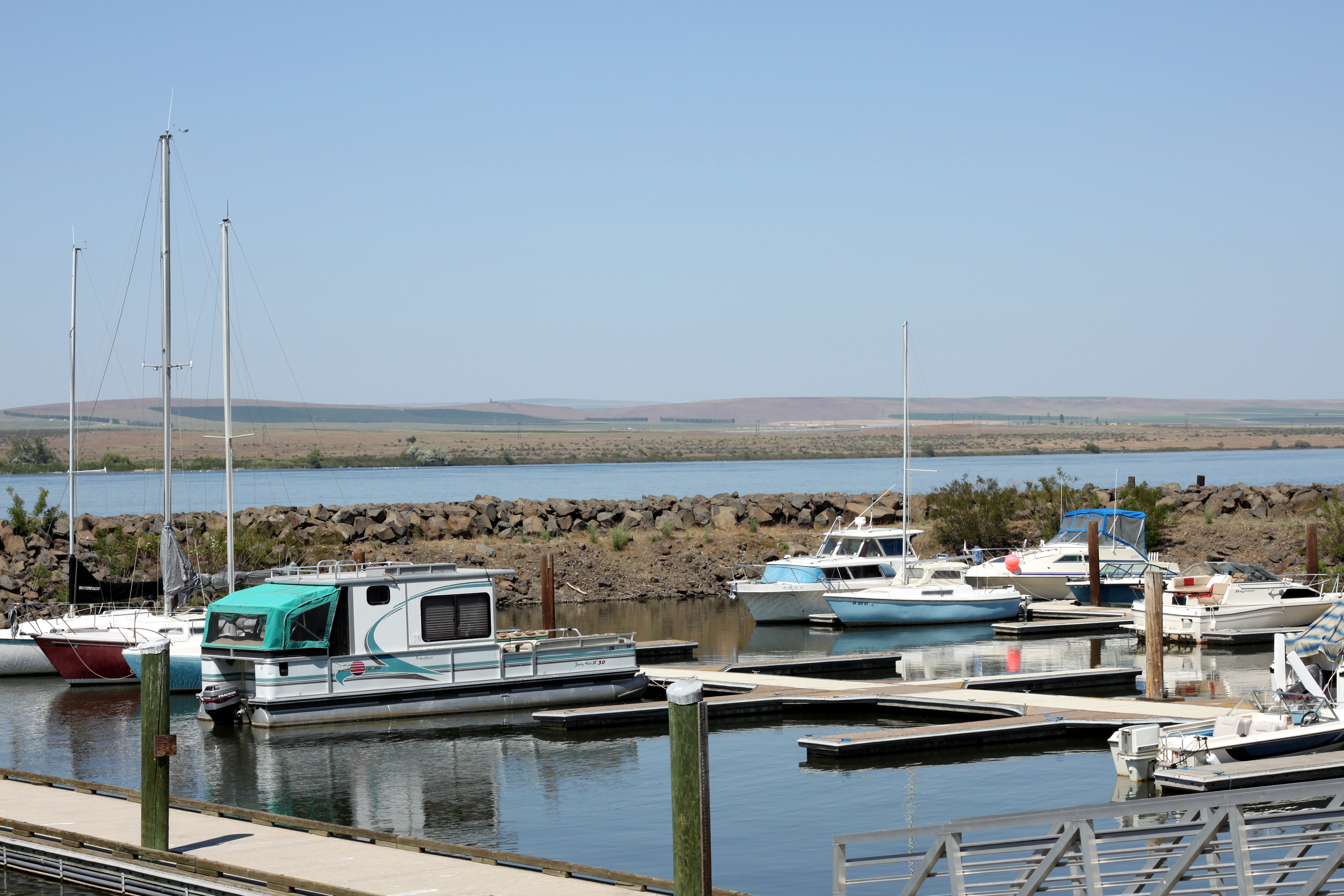
- Marina on the Columbia River in Irrigon

- Location in Morrow County and the state of Oregon
- Coordinates: 45°53′44″N 119°29′34″W
- Country: United States
- State: Oregon
- County: Morrow
- Incorporated: February 28, 1957

Government
  - Mayor: Michelle Patton

Area
  - Total: 1.45 sq mi (3.75 km^{2})
  - Land: 1.30 sq mi (3.36 km^{2})
  - Water: 0.15 sq mi (0.39 km^{2})
- Elevation: 302 ft (92 m)

Population (2020)
  - Total: 2,011
  - Density: 1,551.0/sq mi (598.83/km^{2})
- Time zone: UTC-8 (Pacific)
  - Summer (DST): UTC-7 (Pacific)
- ZIP Code: 97844
- Area code: 541
- FIPS code: 41-36500
- GNIS feature ID: 2410115
- Website: ci.irrigon.or.us

Irrigon is a city in Morrow County, Oregon, United States, on the Columbia River and U.S. Route 730. The city is part of the Pendleton–Hermiston Micropolitan Statistical Area. The population was 2,011 at the 2020 census, up from 1,826 in 2010.

Irrigon was incorporated on February 28, 1957.

== History ==
Native American were the original inhabitants of this region. The Native American tribal communities residing in this area constructed their dwellings from woven reed materials, fashioning them into lodge structures.

Irrigon is near the site of a former Columbia River landing called "Grande Ronde Landing" that vied with Umatilla Landing (Umatilla), 8 miles (13 km) upriver, for water-transportation business. Umatilla Landing prospered but Grande Ronde Landing did not; the latter was eventually renamed "Stokes". In 1903, a newspaper editor, Addison Bennett, renamed the community "Irrigon", a portmanteau assembled from "Irrigation" and "Oregon". Bennett, who saw irrigation as important to business in the city, published its first newspaper, the Oregon Irrigator, later renamed the Irrigon Irrigator.

Stokes, the site of a railway station by that name, had a post office that operated from 1876 through 1899; Douglas W. Bailey served as postmaster. An Irrigon post office was established in 1903; Frank B. Holbrook was the first postmaster.

== Geography ==
Irrigon is northeastern Morrow County on the south bank of the Columbia River. U.S. Route 730 passes through the city, leading southwest 7 miles (11 km) to Interstate 84 and east (upriver) the same distance to Umatilla. The Umatilla Chemical Depot and the Umatilla Chemical Agent Disposal Facility begin about 3 miles (5 km) south of the city and extend to near the intersection of I-84 and Interstate 82 (I-82), 8 miles (13 km) to the southeast. The Irrigon Hatchery is along the Columbia River about 3 miles (5 km) west of Irrigon.

According to the U.S. Census Bureau, Irrigon has a total area of 1.45 square miles (3.76 km^{2}), of which 1.30 square miles (3.37 km^{2}) are land and 0.15 square miles (0.39 km^{2}), or 10.3%, are water in the Columbia River.

=== Climate ===
According to the Köppen Climate Classification system, Irrigon has a semi-arid climate, abbreviated "BSk" on climate maps.

== Economy and education ==
Irrigon is an agriculture- and food processing-based community. The largest employer is Western Alfalfa, a company that makes prepared livestock feeds.

Irrigon Junior/Senior High School, Irrigon Elementary School, A.C. Houghton Elementary School, and the Morrow Education Center, an alternative school, are in Irrigon. They are part of the Morrow County School District, which has its headquarters in Lexington.

In June 2014, the city made the news when it announced that it would pay a bounty of one dollar for each large trash bag of puncturevine, an invasive plant.

== Demographics ==
Historical population
Census	Pop.	Note	%±
1910	125		—
1920	115		−8.0%
1930	65		−43.5%
1950	75		—
1960	232		209.3%
1970	261		12.5%
1980	700		168.2%
1990	737		5.3%
2000	1,702		130.9%
2010	1,826		7.3%
2020	2,011		10.1%

=== 2020 census ===
As of the 2020 census, Irrigon had a population of 2,011. The median age was 35.2 years. 27.4% of residents were under the age of 18 and 15.4% of residents were 65 years of age or older. For every 100 females there were 102.7 males, and for every 100 females age 18 and over there were 102.9 males age 18 and over.

As of the 2020 census, 0% of residents lived in urban areas, while 100.0% lived in rural areas.

As of the 2020 census, there were 664 households in Irrigon, of which 42.0% had children under the age of 18 living in them. Of all households, 55.9% were married-couple households, 16.1% were households with a male householder and no spouse or partner present, and 18.1% were households with a female householder and no spouse or partner present. About 16.4% of all households were made up of individuals and 6.3% had someone living alone who was 65 years of age or older.

As of the 2020 census, there were 691 housing units, of which 3.9% were vacant. Among occupied housing units, 74.7% were owner-occupied and 25.3% were renter-occupied. The homeowner vacancy rate was 0.6% and the rental vacancy rate was 5.6%.

Racial composition as of the 2020 census
Race	Number	Percent
White	1,185	58.9%
Black or African American	6	0.3%
American Indian and Alaska Native	37	1.8%
Asian	4	0.2%
Native Hawaiian and Other Pacific Islander	3	0.1%
Some other race	499	24.8%
Two or more races	277	13.8%
Hispanic or Latino (of any race)	839	41.7%

=== 2010 census ===
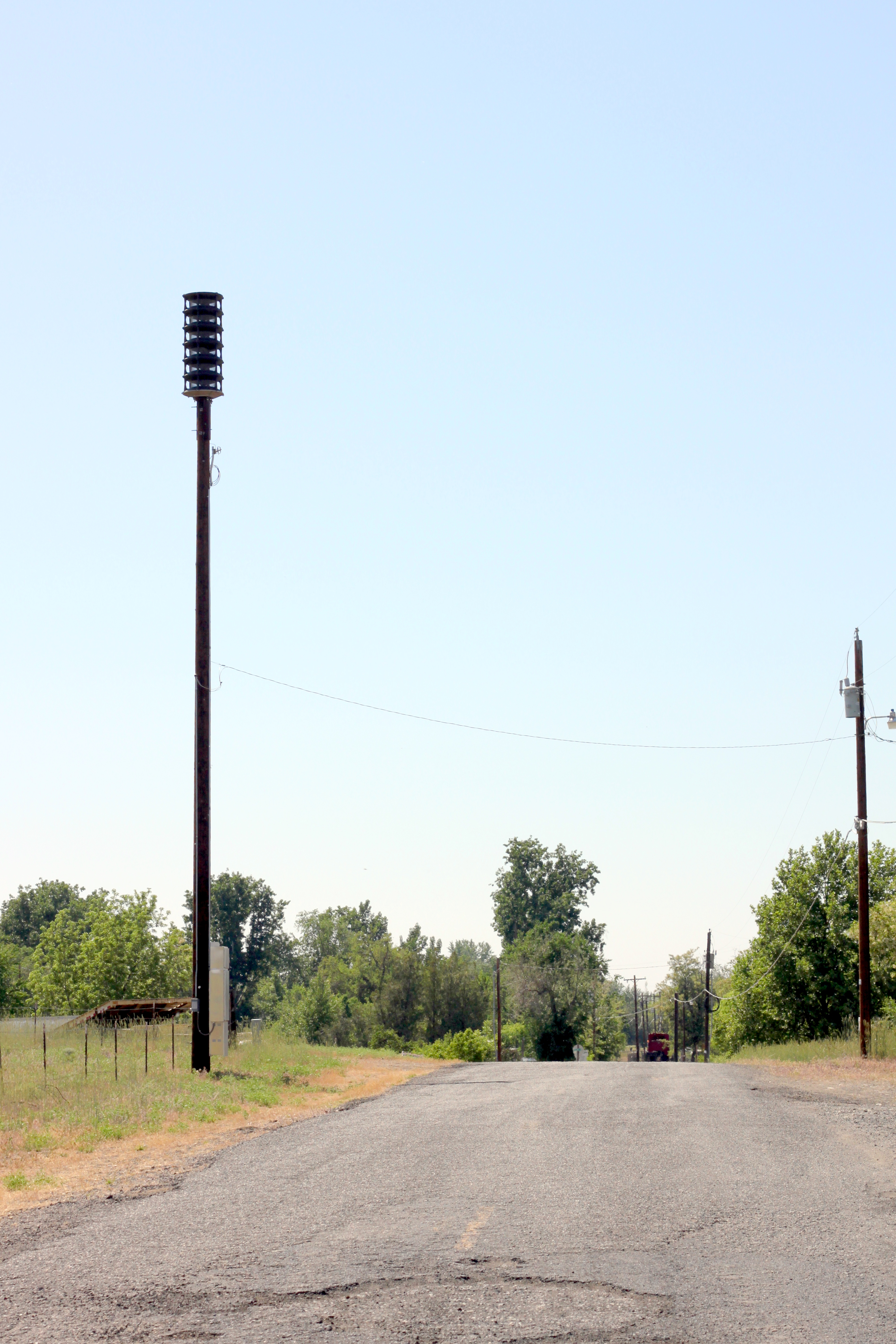
Evacuation siren in Irrigon for the Umatilla Chemical Agent Disposal Facility

As of the census of 2010, there were 1,826 people, 602 households, and 463 families residing in the city. The population density was 1,404.6 inhabitants per square mile (542.3/km^{2}). There were 640 housing units at an average density of 492.3 per square mile (190.1/km^{2}). The racial makeup of the city was 76.2% White, 0.4% African American, 1.4% Native American, 0.6% Asian, 0.1% Pacific Islander, 18.5% from other races, and 2.7% from two or more races. Hispanic or Latino of any race were 32.0% of the population.

There were 602 households, of which 44.0% had children under the age of 18 living with them, 58.0% were married couples living together, 11.1% had a female householder with no husband present, 7.8% had a male householder with no wife present, and 23.1% were non-families. 17.4% of all households were made up of individuals, and 6.4% had someone living alone who was 65 years of age or older. The average household size was 3.03 and the average family size was 3.43.

The median age in the city was 33.3 years. 31.9% of residents were under the age of 18; 7.6% were between the ages of 18 and 24; 26.3% were from 25 to 44; 23.2% were from 45 to 64; and 11.2% were 65 years of age or older. The gender makeup of the city was 49.2% male and 50.8% female.

=== 2000 census ===
As of the census of 2000, there were 1,702 people, 565 households, and 441 families residing in the city. The population density was 1,376.5 inhabitants per square mile (531.5/km^{2}). There were 609 housing units at an average density of 492.5 per square mile (190.2/km^{2}). The racial makeup of the city was 72.91% White, 0.18% African American, 1.12% Native American, 0.41% Asian, 22.91% from other races, and 2.47% from two or more races. Hispanic or Latino of any race were 27.26% of the population.

There were 565 households, out of which 40.2% had children under the age of 18 living with them, 60.0% were married couples living together, 12.4% had a female householder with no husband present, and 21.8% were non-families. 16.5% of all households were made up of individuals, and 6.0% had someone living alone who was 65 years of age or older. The average household size was 3.01 and the average family size was 3.33.

In the city, the population was spread out, with 32.5% under the age of 18, 10.0% from 18 to 24, 27.1% from 25 to 44, 21.0% from 45 to 64, and 9.4% who were 65 years of age or older. The median age was 30 years. For every 100 females, there were 96.3 males. For every 100 females age 18 and over, there were 96.1 males.

The median income for a household in the city was $35,799, and the median income for a family was $35,573. Males had a median income of $29,435 versus $21,953 for females. The per capita income for the city was $14,600. About 12.9% of families and 13.8% of the population were below the poverty line, including 21.1% of those under age 18 and 5.9% of those age 65 or over.

== See also ==
- List of cities in Oregon
