= Irrigon Irrigator =

- Type: Weekly newspaper
- Founder(s): Addison Bennett
- Launched: January 27, 1904
- Language: English
- Ceased publication: 1912
- City: Irrigon, Oregon
- OCLC number: 38368565

The Irrigon Irrigator was a newspaper based in Irrigon in the U.S. state of Oregon from 1904 to 1912.

== History ==
The newspaper was founded by Addison Bennett, who had previously named the town, as a portmanteau of the words "irrigation" and "Oregon." The town was "the scene of a promising irrigation enterprise," the basis for the names of both the newspaper and the town. The first issue, published January 27, 1904, bore the name Oregon Irrigator; the title was changed several months hence. Bennett made several entrepreneurial forays into the newspaper publishing business, and later served as a staff writer for the Oregonian.

Bennett, at about age 60, was new to the American west when he founded the paper. He was the town's second postmaster. He used the paper as a vehicle to promote the irrigation industry in the region; he was also known for his "jackrabbit" stories, which were syndicated in other newspapers. The Irrigator was discontinued in 1912 (or 1914??), the year after Bennett departed for Portland. The paper was known for being full of "droll wit" and "homespun philosophy," but not selling much advertising.

Bennett's work was published in other Oregon newspapers during the Irrigator's run, including the Oregon Daily Journal. Bennett was an invited speaker at the Pendleton Fair in 1908, two years before the Pendleton Round-Up was established.

Another paper by the same title was later started, publishing in the early 2000s.
