= Sonia Raman =

American basketball coach (born 1974)

- Raman with the Seattle Storm in 2026

Seattle Storm
- Title: Head coach
- League: WNBA

Personal information
- Born: February 11, 1974 (age 52) Framingham, Massachusetts, U.S.

Career information
- High school: Framingham (Framingham, Massachusetts)
- College: Tufts (1992–1996)
- Position: Guard
- Coaching career: 1996–1998, 2002–present

Career history

Coaching
- 1996–1998: Tufts (assistant)
- 2002–2008: Wellesley (assistant)
- 2008–2020: MIT
- 2020–2024: Memphis Grizzlies (assistant)
- 2025: New York Liberty (assistant)
- 2026–present: Seattle Storm

Career highlights
- As head coach: 2× NEWMAC Coach of the Year (2016, 2017)

Sonia Raman (/ˈsoʊnjə ˈrɑːmən/ SOHN-yə RAH-mən; born February 11, 1974) is an American professional basketball coach who is the head coach for the Seattle Storm of the Women's National Basketball Association (WNBA). She was the head coach of the MIT Engineers women's basketball team from 2008 to 2020, and had the most wins in the team's history. She served as an assistant coach for the Memphis Grizzlies of the National Basketball Association (NBA) from 2020 to 2024.

== College and legal career ==
Raman attended Framingham High School in Framingham, Massachusetts. She enrolled at Tufts University in 1992 and joined the basketball team as a walk-on. Raman played off the bench as a guard. During her junior season, she was hit by a car while she crossed a street and broke the tibia and fibula in her left leg. Raman was ruled out for the second half of her junior season and the first half of her senior season. She began to develop her coaching abilities during her playing absence as she encouraged her teammates and studied basketball. She served as team co-captain during her senior season. Raman graduated from Tufts University in 1996 with a Bachelor of Arts degree in International Relations. She asked head coach Janice Savitz if she could stay as an assistant coach after her graduation and spent two years in the position. She went on to receive a Juris Doctor from Boston College Law School in 2001.

After graduating from law school, Raman worked for the United States Department of Labor. She then worked for Fidelity Investments as a lawyer on their risk and compliance team. Raman left her job at Fidelity in 2008 to concentrate on her coaching career.

== Coaching career ==
Raman began her intercollegiate coaching career with a two-year stint as an assistant coach at Tufts.

On July 9, 2008, Raman was named head coach of the MIT Engineers women's basketball team after serving as an assistant coach at Wellesley College for the previous six years. Raman was named New England Women's and Men's Athletic Conference (NEWMAC) Women's Basketball Coach of the Year in 2016 and 2017.

On September 11, 2020, the Memphis Grizzlies of the National Basketball Association (NBA) announced Raman was hired as an assistant coach. She became the first Indian-American woman and the 14th woman to be named as an NBA coach. Raman had developed a relationship with Rich Cho, the Grizzlies' vice president of basketball strategy, who she first encountered when Cho was looking for student intern recommendations. Grizzlies head coach Taylor Jenkins was "blown away" by Raman and had no qualms in hiring her despite her relative unknown status. Raman worked in scouting, player development and analytics for the Grizzlies. She was replaced on the Grizzlies coaching staff in 2024.

In 2025, Raman joined the coaching staff of the defending WNBA champion, the New York Liberty.

On October 28, 2025, Raman was announced as the head coach for the Seattle Storm. She became the first person of Indian descent to be a head coach in the WNBA. The Storm had a league-worst 8–36 record during the 2026 season.

== Head coaching record ==
=== College ===
Record table
Season	Team	Overall	Conference	Standing	Postseason
MIT Engineers (NEWMAC) (2008–2020)
2008–09	MIT	4–19	0–13		
2009–10	MIT	5–19	3–15		
2010–11	MIT	8–16	4–14		
2011–12	MIT	10–14	6–12		
2012–13	MIT	11–13	7–11		
2013–14	MIT	12–14	9–11		
2014–15	MIT	11–15	7–9		
2015–16	MIT	17–9	11–5		
2016–17	MIT	20–6	13–3		
2017–18	MIT	18–10	10–6		NCAA Division III Round of 64
2018–19	MIT	21–8	12–4		NCAA Division III Round of 64
2019–20	MIT	15–12	7–3		
MIT:		152–155 (.495)	89–106 (.456)		
Total:		152–155 (.495)			
National champion Postseason invitational champion Conference regular season champion Conference regular season and conference tournament champion Division regular season champion Division regular season and conference tournament champion Conference tournament champion

== Personal life ==
Raman was born in Framingham, Massachusetts. Her parents were born in India and moved to the United States after they graduated from college; her mother is from Nagpur and her father is from Chennai.

Raman is married to Milena Flores who played in the WNBA.

== See also ==
- List of female NBA coaches
