= Brummell =

Brummell may refer to:

- Beau Brummell, born George Bryan Brummell (1778–1840), arbiter of men's fashion in Regency England, friend of the future King George IV
- Brummell (opera), a 1931 operetta by Reynaldo Hahn, libretto by Rip and Robert Dieudonné
- Brummell Sendai, nickname of Vegalta Sendai, a Japanese professional football (soccer) club
- Paul Brummell (born 1965), British diplomat

== See also ==
- Beau Brummell: This Charming Man, 2006 BBC Television drama
- Beau Brummell (1954 film) (1954)
- Procter and Collier-Beau Brummell Building, in Cincinnati, Ohio
- Brumel (disambiguation)
- Brummen
- Brummer (disambiguation)
