= Lisa Brummel =

American businesswoman

- Born: 1959 or 1960 (age 66–67)
- Education: Yale University; University of California, Los Angeles

Lisa E. Brummel (born 1959/1960) is an American businesswoman who served as Executive Vice President of Human Resources for Microsoft until her retirement on December 31, 2014. She previously served as corporate vice president of the company's Home & Retail Division.

Brummel was raised in Connecticut. She earned a bachelor's degree in sociology from Yale University in 1981, followed by a master's degree in business administration from the University of California, Los Angeles. She joined Microsoft in 1989.

In December 2014, Brummel left Microsoft after 25 years of service and almost a decade leading the Human Resources Organization.

She is a co-owner of the Seattle Storm, a professional women's basketball team in the WNBA.

Brummel is a recipient of a 2003 George H.W. Bush Lifetime of Leadership Award.

Sporting positions
Preceded by Clay Bennett	Seattle Storm principal owner 2008–present Served alongside: Virginia Gilder, Dawn Trudeau and Sue Bird	Incumbent
