= Climate of Seattle =

Seattle

Climate chart (precipitation, max. and min. temperature)
J	F	M	A	M	J	J	A	S	O	N	D
5.2 48 38	3.9 50 38	3.3 54 40	2 59 43	1.5 66 49	1.4 71 53	0.6 77 57	0.8 78 57	1.6 72 54	3.9 61 47	6.3 52 41	5.7 47 37
- █ Average max. and min. temperatures in °F
- █ Precipitation totals in inches
Metric conversion
J	F	M	A	M	J	J	A	S	O	N	D
132 9 3	99 10 3	84 12 4	50 15 6	38 19 9	36 22 12	16 25 14	19 26 14	41 22 12	99 16 8	160 11 5	145 8 3
- █ Average max. and min. temperatures in °C
- █ Precipitation totals in mm

The climate of Seattle is temperate, classified in the warm-summer (in contrast to hot-summer) subtype of the Mediterranean zone by the most common climate classification (Köppen: Csb) although some sources put the city in the oceanic zone (Trewartha: Do). It has cool, wet winters and warm, dry summers, covering characteristics of both.

The climate is sometimes characterized as a "modified Mediterranean" climate because it is cooler and wetter than a "true" Mediterranean climate, but shares the characteristic dry summer and the associated reliance upon cooler-season precipitation (which has a strong influence on the region's vegetation). The city is part of USDA hardiness zone 9a, with surrounding pockets falling under 8b.

Records for the Seattle City area date back to 1894, with records at Seattle-Tacoma International Airport beginning in 1945, a location notably not within Seattle. Prior to 1945 the official temperatures were observed in locations in downtown Seattle, which tends in general to be somewhat warmer and drier than the airport location. The hottest officially recorded temperature was 108 °F (42 °C) on June 28, 2021; the coldest recorded temperature was 0 °F (−18 °C) on January 31, 1950; the record cold daily maximum is 16 °F (−9 °C) on January 14, 1950, while, conversely, the record warm daily minimum is 73 °F (23 °C) on June 27, 2021.

Seattle generally does not experience many extremes of weather. However, the 21st century has seen a trend towards more extreme high-temperature and large-precipitation events. In July 2009 Seattle's all-time high temperature was broken by a margin of 4 degrees Fahrenheit (2.2 Celsius), then broken again by a margin of 5 F (2.8 C) in June 2021. The single-day precipitation record set in October 2003 saw higher precipitation by nearly 2 inches (50mm) than any other day on record. However, thunderstorms are still rare, as the city reports thunder on just seven days per year. Similarly, the city typically receives at least light snowfall every year, though heavy snowfall is uncommon.

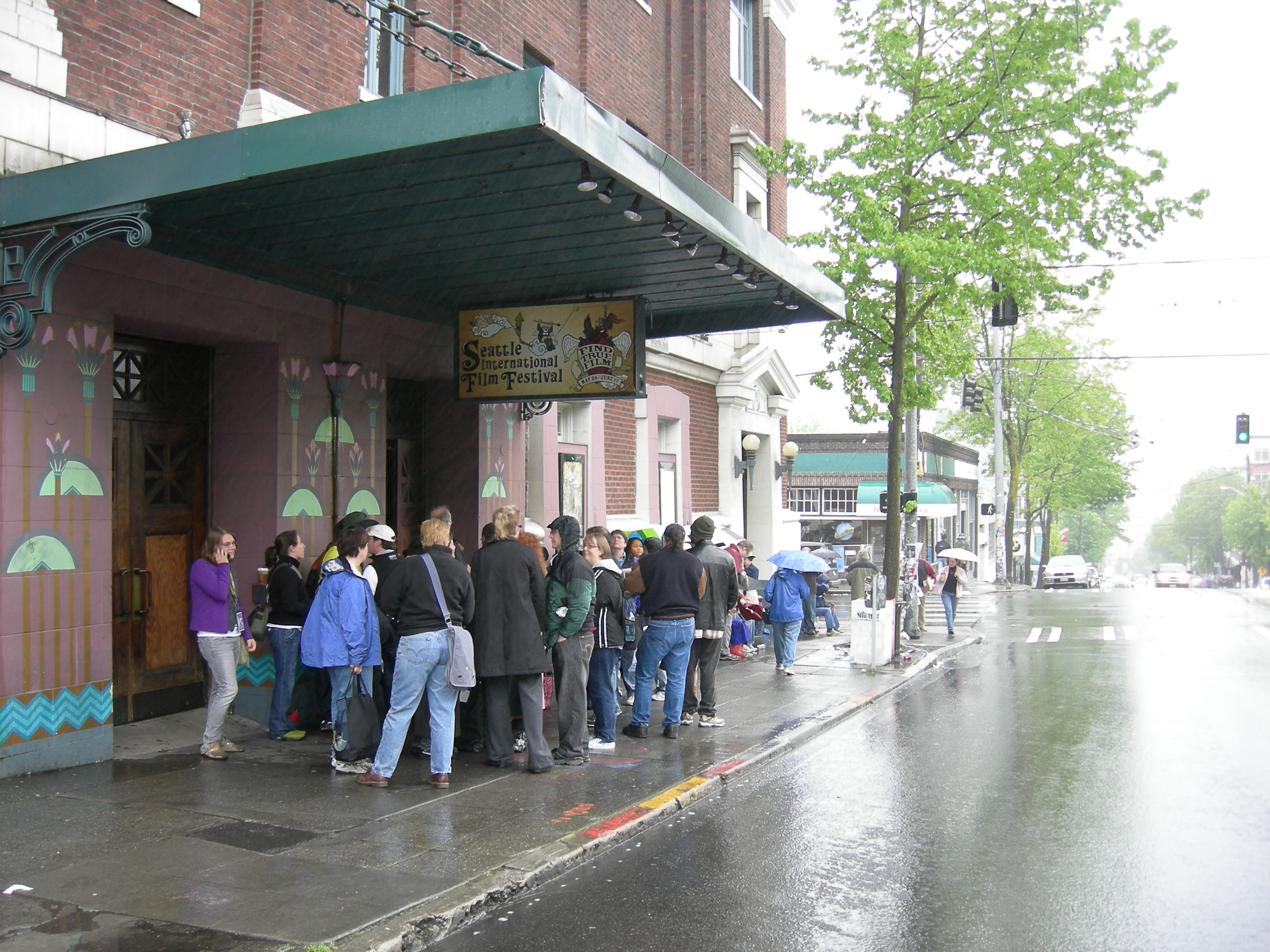
A rainy day in Capitol Hill, Seattle. Seattle experiences around 150 days with at least 0.01 inches (0.25 mm) precipitation each year.

== Regional setting and synoptic drivers ==
Seattle's climate is governed at the largest scale by the semi-permanent pressure centers of the North Pacific and by the position of the polar jet stream. During summer, the North Pacific High expands northward and dominates the eastern Pacific, deflecting the storm track well to the north of Washington and producing the region's characteristic warm, dry, and stable summer regime. From late autumn to early spring, the high weakens and retreats southward while the Aleutian Low, a semi-permanent low-pressure system centered near the Aleutian Islands, intensifies and shifts south, becoming one of the dominant centers of action in Northern Hemisphere atmospheric circulation.

Extratropical cyclones forming in the sub-polar latitudes of the North Pacific characteristically slow and reach peak intensity in the vicinity of the Aleutian Low, after which the polar jet stream steers many of them eastward toward the Pacific Northwest coast. The resulting cool-season storm track delivers the great majority of Seattle's annual precipitation between October and March, with the wettest months — November, December, and January — accounting for roughly half of the city's annual rainfall by volume.

When winter ridging over the eastern Pacific deflects the jet stream northward and the polar vortex remains contained over the Arctic, the storm track is shunted away from western Washington, producing extended dry or fair spells. When the polar vortex is disrupted and the jet stream buckles southward into the central or eastern United States, Seattle is typically spared the resulting cold waves, which are channeled east of the Cascades rather than across the Puget Sound lowland.

== Temperature ==
A weather report from Seattle-Tacoma Airport in June 2021. Seattle recorded its highest temperature ever on June 28, reaching 108 °F (42 °C).

The city's regime of temperature features small seasonal swings, due to its proximity to the ocean. The Pacific Ocean, Puget Sound and Lake Washington serve as moderators of the temperature meaning the city is milder than areas inland during the winter and cooler during the summer. Extreme heatwaves are rare, as are cold temperatures. Hot temperature extremes are enhanced by dry, compressed wind from the west slopes of the Cascades, while cold temperatures are generated mainly from the Fraser Valley in British Columbia. Records are taken from the Seattle City area from 1894 to 1944 and at Sea-Tac Airport from 1945.

=== Averages ===
In an average year, the temperature will usually be between 21 °F (−6 °C) and 94 °F (34 °C) with temperatures greatly exceeding these values being uncommon. Temperatures above 97 °F (36 °C) and below 15 °F (−9 °C) are very rare, with the last occurrences being June 28, 2021 and November 24, 2010, respectively.

Climate data for Seattle (Seattle-Tacoma International Airport), 1991–2020 normals
Month	Jan	Feb	Mar	Apr	May	Jun	Jul	Aug	Sep	Oct	Nov	Dec	Year
Mean maximum °F (°C)	57.0 (13.9)	59.1 (15.1)	66.4 (19.1)	74.3 (23.5)	81.9 (27.7)	85.8 (29.9)	91.2 (32.9)	89.9 (32.2)	84.1 (28.9)	72.0 (22.2)	61.6 (16.4)	56.8 (13.8)	94.1 (34.5)
Mean daily maximum °F (°C)	48.0 (8.9)	50.3 (10.2)	54.2 (12.3)	59.3 (15.2)	66.3 (19.1)	71.1 (21.7)	77.4 (25.2)	77.6 (25.3)	71.6 (22.0)	60.5 (15.8)	52.1 (11.2)	47.0 (8.3)	61.3 (16.3)
Daily mean °F (°C)	42.8 (6.0)	44.0 (6.7)	47.1 (8.4)	51.3 (10.7)	57.5 (14.2)	62.0 (16.7)	67.1 (19.5)	67.4 (19.7)	62.6 (17.0)	53.8 (12.1)	46.5 (8.1)	42.0 (5.6)	53.7 (12.1)
Mean daily minimum °F (°C)	37.7 (3.2)	37.7 (3.2)	39.9 (4.4)	43.3 (6.3)	48.7 (9.3)	53.0 (11.7)	56.8 (13.8)	57.2 (14.0)	53.6 (12.0)	47.0 (8.3)	40.9 (4.9)	37.1 (2.8)	46.1 (7.8)
Mean minimum °F (°C)	26.1 (−3.3)	27.3 (−2.6)	31.3 (−0.4)	35.6 (2.0)	40.6 (4.8)	46.6 (8.1)	51.5 (10.8)	51.7 (10.9)	45.8 (7.7)	36.8 (2.7)	29.2 (−1.6)	25.4 (−3.7)	21.5 (−5.8)
Source: NOAA

=== Highest daily temperatures ===
Period	Record temperature	Date
January	67 °F (19 °C)	Jan 28, 1931
February	70 °F (21 °C)	Feb 27, 1968
March	79 °F (26 °C)	Mar 20, 2019; Mar 19, 2019
April	89 °F (32 °C)	Apr 18, 2016
May	93 °F (34 °C)	May 21, 1963
June	108 °F (42 °C)	Jun 28, 2021
July	103 °F (39 °C)	Jul 29, 2009
August	99 °F (37 °C)	Aug 9, 1981; Aug 9, 1960
September	98 °F (37 °C)	Sep 2, 1988
October	89 °F (32 °C)	Oct 1, 1987
November	74 °F (23 °C)	Nov 3, 2010; Nov 4, 1949
December	66 °F (19 °C)	Dec 10, 2014

=== Lowest daily temperatures ===
Period	Record temperature	Date
January	0 °F (−18 °C)	Jan 31, 1950
February	−1 °F (−18 °C)	Feb 1, 1950
March	11 °F (−12 °C)	Mar 4, 1955
April	29 °F (−2 °C)	Apr 5, 1975; Apr 1, 1953; Apr 7–8, 1952; Apr 21, 1951
May	28 °F (−2 °C)	May 1, 1954
June	38 °F (3 °C)	Jun 12, 1952
July	43 °F (6 °C)	Jul 4, 1949; Jul 24, 1953; Jul 2, 1954
August	44 °F (7 °C)	Aug 13–14, 1955; Aug 27, 1952; Aug 29, 1951; Aug 4, 1950; Aug 21, 1947
September	35 °F (2 °C)	Sep 27, 1972
October	28 °F (−2 °C)	Oct 19, 1949
November	6 °F (−14 °C)	Nov 15, 1955
December	6 °F (−14 °C)	Dec 30, 1968

=== Daily record warm minima ===
Period	Record temperature	Date
January	54 °F (12 °C)	Jan 24, 1935
February	54 °F (12 °C)	Feb 28, 1901
March	59 °F (15 °C)	Mar 19, 2019
April	57 °F (14 °C)	Apr 28, 1976
May	65 °F (18 °C)	May 15, 2023; May 9, 1940
June	73 °F (23 °C)	Jun 27, 2021
July	71 °F (22 °C)	Jul 29, 2009
August	71 °F (22 °C)	Aug 14, 2023
September	69 °F (21 °C)	Sep 2, 1974
October	63 °F (17 °C)	Oct 18, 1940
November	58 °F (14 °C)	Nov 4, 2020
December	55 °F (13 °C)	Dec 26, 1980; Dec 28, 1917

=== Daily record cold maxima ===
Period	Record temperature	Date
January	16 °F (−9 °C)	Jan 14, 1950
February	18 °F (−8 °C)	Feb 2, 1989
March	29 °F (−2 °C)	Mar 4, 1955
April	41 °F (5 °C)	Apr 3, 1920; Apr 11, 1911
May	46 °F (8 °C)	May 15, 1894
June	50 °F (10 °C)	Jun 1, 1908
July	54 °F (12 °C)	Jul 2, 1966
August	54 °F (12 °C)	Aug 2, 1956
September	49 °F (9 °C)	Sep 26, 1948
October	35 °F (2 °C)	Oct 30, 1935
November	21 °F (−6 °C)	Nov 12, 1955
December	17 °F (−8 °C)	Dec 29, 1968

=== Highest averages ===
Period	Record mean	Year
Year	55.6 °F (13.1 °C)	1940, 2015
Spring (March–May)	55.8 °F (13.2 °C)	1934
Summer (June–August)	69.2 °F (20.7 °C)	2015
Autumn (September–November)	57.4 °F (14.1 °C)	1967
Winter (December–February)	46.9 °F (8.3 °C)	1940–1941
January	47.0 °F (8.3 °C)	2010
February	48.8 °F (9.3 °C)	2015
March	53.1 °F (11.7 °C)	1941
April	56.7 °F (13.7 °C)	2016
May	61.2 °F (16.2 °C)	2018
June	67.7 °F (19.8 °C)	2015
July	71.2 °F (21.8 °C)	2015
August	71.1 °F (21.7 °C)	1967
September	65.7 °F (18.7 °C)	1967
October	58.0 °F (14.4 °C)	2014
November	51.9 °F (11.1 °C)	1899
December	47.5 °F (8.6 °C)	1939

=== Lowest averages ===
Period	Record mean	Year
Year	47.9 °F (8.8 °C)	1955
Spring (March–May)	44.8 °F (7.1 °C)	1955
Summer (June–August)	59.0 °F (15.0 °C)	1954
Autumn (September–November)	48.4 °F (9.1 °C)	1985
Winter (December–February)	34.4 °F (1.3 °C)	1949–1950, 1948–1949
January	24.9 °F (−3.9 °C)	1950
February	35.6 °F (2.0 °C)	1956
March	39.1 °F (3.9 °C)	1955
April	44.6 °F (7.0 °C)	1955
May	50.6 °F (10.3 °C)	1962
June	55.5 °F (13.1 °C)	1953
July	60.0 °F (15.6 °C)	1955
August	60.2 °F (15.7 °C)	1910
September	55.3 °F (12.9 °C)	1972
October	47.7 °F (8.7 °C)	1946
November	35.8 °F (2.1 °C)	1985
December	35.2 °F (1.8 °C)	1990

NOTE: in the tables below, all numbers before 1945 come from locations in downtown Seattle, which tends to be somewhat warmer than the current official location of Sea-Tac airport. To distinguish these older numbers we mark them below in italics.

== Precipitation ==
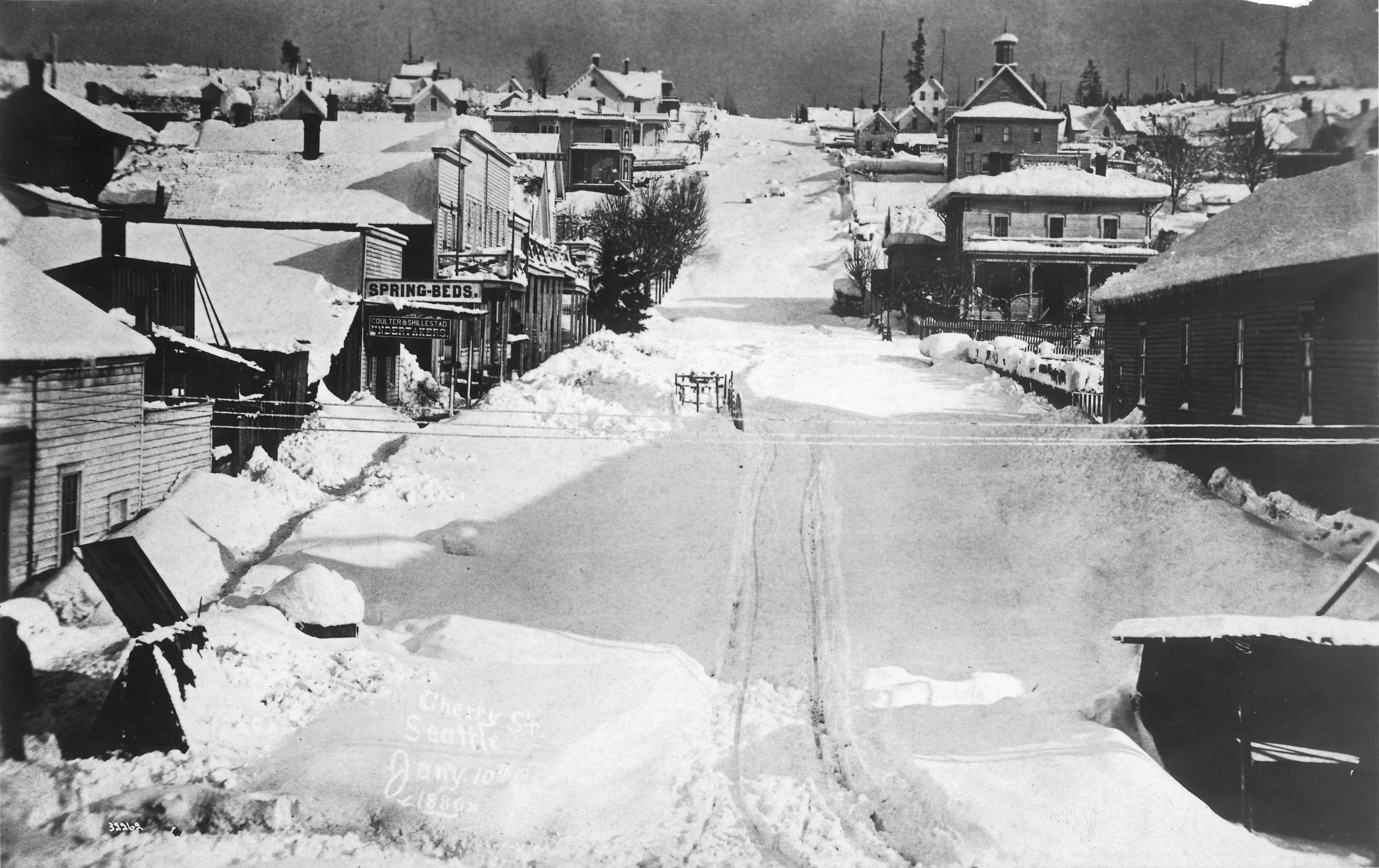
Cherry Street after heavy snowfall on January 10, 1880

The city sees frequent, though light rainfall between October and May, with rainfall becoming lighter and sparser between June and September. With many more "rain days" than other major American cities, Seattle has a well-earned reputation for frequent rain. In an average year, at least 0.01 inches (0.25 mm) of precipitation falls on 150 days, more than nearly all U.S. cities east of the Rocky Mountains. In November, Seattle averages more rainfall than any other U.S. city of more than 250,000 people; it also ranks highly in winter precipitation. Conversely, the city receives some of the lowest precipitation amounts of any large city from June to September. Seattle is one of the five rainiest major U.S. cities as measured by the number of days with precipitation.

Because Seattle often has merely a light drizzle falling from the sky for many days, it actually receives significantly less rainfall (or other precipitation) overall than many other U.S. cities like New York City, Miami, or Houston. Seattle experiences its heaviest rainfall during November, December, and January, receiving roughly half of its annual rainfall (by volume) during this period. Light rain and drizzle are the predominant forms of precipitation during the remainder of the year. On average, less than 1.6 in (41 mm) of rain falls in July and August combined when rain is less common.

Annually, total precipitation averages 39.3 in (998 mm), with winter being the wettest season and July the driest month. At Sea-Tac, rain has fallen in every month since records began there in January 1945. Previously in the Seattle City area, the Julys of 1896 and 1922 reported no precipitation. Long stretches of little precipitation can occur. No measurable precipitation, greater than 0.01 inches (0.25 mm), fell between June 18 and August 13, 2017.

Seattle also sees snow, primarily in winter, but sometimes in the late autumn and early spring. Snowfall averages 6.3 in (16.0 cm) per year but is highly variable between winter seasons. The most rainfall in 24 hours was 5.02 in (127.5 mm) on October 20, 2003, and the most snowfall was 21.5 in (55 cm) on February 2, 1916. Seattle typically receives some snowfall on an annual basis but heavy snow is rare. Average annual snowfall, as measured at Sea-Tac Airport, is 6.3 inches (16.0 cm). From winter season to winter season, amounts can be extremely variable.

One of many exceptions to Seattle's reputation as a damp location occurs in El Niño years, when marine weather systems track as far south as California and less than the usual precipitation falls in the Puget Sound area. However, the El Nino of 2015-2016 caused an increase in rainfall. Since the region's water comes from mountain snow packs during the dry summer months, El Niño winters can not only produce substandard skiing but can result in water rationing and a shortage of hydroelectric power the following summer.

=== Orographic precipitation gradient ===
Seattle's modest annual rainfall belies its position within one of the steepest precipitation gradients in the contiguous United States. The city lies in the lee of the Olympic Mountains, which rise abruptly to nearly 8,000 feet (2,400 m) from near sea level only about 60 miles (97 km) to the west and intercept moisture-laden flow arriving from the open Pacific. The resulting orographic uplift produces extreme precipitation totals on the windward slopes: the Hoh Rainforest on the western flank of the range averages roughly 142 inches (3,600 mm) annually, with upper elevations of Mount Olympus estimated to receive in excess of 200 inches (5,100 mm), making the windward Olympics among the wettest locations in the conterminous United States. For context, Sixty miles (97 km) to the south of Seattle, the state capital Olympia, which is out of the Olympic Mountains' rain shadow, receives an annual average precipitation of 50 in (1,270 mm), and the city of Bremerton, about 15 mi (24 km) west of downtown Seattle on the other side of Puget Sound, receives 56.4 in (1,430 mm) annually.

The descending, drying air on the leeward side of the range produces a pronounced rain shadow. Within roughly 40 miles (64 km) of the Hoh Rainforest, annual precipitation collapses to about 16 inches (410 mm) at Sequim in the Dungeness Valley — comparable to semi-arid locations such as Los Angeles — producing a so-called "blue hole" in which sunshine frequently persists while the surrounding region is overcast. The gradient between these extremes is exceptionally compressed: heading west from Port Angeles (26 inches (660 mm)) along U.S. Highway 101, annual precipitation rises to roughly 56 inches (1,400 mm) at Elwha within 10 miles (16 km) and to about 95 inches (2,400 mm) at Sappho another 27 miles (43 km) farther west, with all three locations at comparable elevations.

Seattle itself lies near the eastern edge of the Olympic rain shadow, which only partially shelters the city, since incoming flow more often arrives from the southwest, threading between the Olympics and the southern Washington coast. Even so, the rain shadow contributes materially to the city's reputation for frequent but light precipitation, as the heaviest precipitation of incoming systems is typically deposited on the Olympic, Willapa Hills, and Cascade slopes before the residual moisture reaches the Puget Sound lowland. A similar but larger-scale rain shadow east of the Cascades produces the semi-arid climate of the Columbia Basin, with several locations receiving less than 10 inches (250 mm) of annual precipitation.

In late fall and early winter, atmospheric river events (popularly termed "Pineapple Express" systems) channel concentrated subtropical moisture from the vicinity of Hawaii directly into western Washington. These events can deliver four to five inches of rainfall in twenty-four hours, far exceeding totals from typical frontal systems, and are a leading cause of major flooding along the Green, Snoqualmie, Puyallup, and Skagit rivers.

=== Averages ===
Climate data for Seattle (SeaTac International Airport), 1991–2020 normals
Month	Jan	Feb	Mar	Apr	May	Jun	Jul	Aug	Sep	Oct	Nov	Dec	Year
Average precipitation inches (mm)	5.78 (147)	3.76 (96)	4.17 (106)	3.18 (81)	1.88 (48)	1.45 (37)	0.60 (15)	0.97 (25)	1.61 (41)	3.91 (99)	6.31 (160)	5.72 (145)	39.34 (999)
Average snowfall inches (cm)	2.5 (6.4)	2.2 (5.6)	0.9 (2.3)	0 (0)	0 (0)	0 (0)	0 (0)	0 (0)	0 (0)	0 (0)	0.5 (1.3)	2.1 (5.3)	8.2 (20.9)
Average precipitation days (≥ 0.01 in)	18.7	15.9	17.1	15.0	11.3	9.2	4.7	4.9	8.3	14.3	18.4	18.4	156.2
Average snowy days (≥ 0.1 in)	2.3	2.0	0.9	0	0	0	0	0	0	0	0.2	1.5	4.7
Source: NOAA

=== Rainfall Extremes ===
==== Lowest ====
Period	Record rainfall	Year
Year	19.85 inches (504 mm)	1944
Spring (March–May)	2.23 inches (57 mm)	1924
Summer (June–August)	0.65 inches (17 mm)	1919
Autumn (September–November)	2.32 inches (59 mm)	1929
Winter (December–February)	5.21 inches (132 mm)	1976–1977
January	0.58 inches (15 mm)	1985
February	0.34 inches (8.6 mm)	1920
March	0.42 inches (11 mm)	1924
April	0.16 inches (4.1 mm)	1939
May	0.12 inches (3.0 mm)	1992, 2018
June	0.03 inches (0.76 mm)	1922
July	0.00 inches (0 mm)	1896, 1922, 2017
August	Trace	2012
September	Trace	1975, 1991
October	0.02 inches (0.51 mm)	1895
November	0.74 inches (19 mm)	1976
December	1.00 inch (25 mm)	1944

==== Highest ====
Period	Record rainfall	Year
Year	55.14 inches (1,401 mm)	1950
Spring (March–May)	16.77 inches (426 mm)	2014
Summer (June–August)	8.43 inches (214 mm)	1968
Autumn (September–November)	18.61 inches (473 mm)	2006
Winter (December–February)	24.63 inches (626 mm)	2015–2016
January	12.92 inches (328 mm)	1953
February	9.11 inches (231 mm)	1961
March	9.44 inches (240 mm)	2014
April	6.53 inches (166 mm)	1991
May	4.76 inches (121 mm)	1948
June	3.90 inches (99 mm)	1946
July	2.39 inches (61 mm)	1983
August	4.59 inches (117 mm)	1975
September	6.17 inches (157 mm)	2013
October	10.05 inches (255 mm)	2016
November	15.63 inches (397 mm)	2006
December	15.33 inches (389 mm)	1933

=== Snowfall ===
==== Highest ====
Period	Record most snowfall	Year
Year (Note: Some traces of snowfall actually have been may hail, thus entries of trace amounts in summer months have been excluded.)	63.6 in (162 cm)	1916
Seasonal (July–June)	67.5 in (171 cm)	1968–1969
Spring (March–May)	18.2 in (46 cm)	1951
Autumn (September–November)	20.5 in (52 cm)	1896
Winter (December–February)	58.7 in (149 cm)	1915–1916
January	57.2 in (145 cm)	1950
February	35.4 in (90 cm)	1916
March	18.2 in (46 cm)	1951
April	2.4 in (6.1 cm)	1920
May	Trace	1993, 1990, 1989, 1974, 1965, 1955, 1953, 1951, 1925
June–September	0 in (0 cm)	–
October	2.0 in (5.1 cm)	1971
November	20.5 in (52 cm)	1896
December	22.1 in (56 cm)	1968

== Major windstorms ==
Although Seattle's day-to-day weather is dominated by light rain and overcast, the deep extratropical cyclones spawned along the Aleutian Low storm track occasionally produce some of the most damaging non-tropical windstorms recorded in the contiguous United States. Atmospheric scientist Cliff Mass has noted that the strongest cool-season cyclones reaching the Pacific Northwest coast are more intense and damaging than typical East Coast storms, an effect amplified by the region's tall conifer canopy, which acts as a force multiplier by toppling onto power infrastructure and structures.

The benchmark event is the Columbus Day storm of 1962, the extratropical remnant of Typhoon Freda, which struck on October 12, 1962 with gusts measured to 170 miles per hour (270 km/h) along the Oregon coast and sustained winds above 100 miles per hour (160 km/h) across much of western Washington. It killed 46 people across Oregon and Washington and caused damages estimated at $230 million in 1962 dollars. It is regarded as the most powerful non-tropical cyclone to strike the contiguous United States in the twentieth century and remains the reference standard against which subsequent windstorms in the region are measured.

The Inauguration Day Storm of January 20, 1993 brought hurricane-force winds across western Washington on the day of President Bill Clinton's first inauguration and is generally regarded as the third most damaging Northwest windstorm of the past half-century, after Columbus Day 1962 and the Hanukkah Eve event of 2006. The Hanukkah Eve Wind Storm of 2006 on December 14–15, 2006, produced gusts of 69 miles per hour (111 km/h) at Sea-Tac Airport and coastal gusts of 80 to 105 knots (148 to 194 km/h), cut electrical power to approximately 1.8 million customers across the region, killed 18 people (many from carbon monoxide poisoning during prolonged outages and improper use of indoor generators), and caused damages exceeding $1 billion. In December 2007, a strong windstorm brought hurricane-force winds and heavy rain to the region, leading to 5 deaths.

Other notable events include the Great Gale of January 9, 1880, the most severe windstorm in the early historical record of the Puget Sound region; the February 13, 1979 storm, which sank a section of the Hood Canal Bridge; and the November 2024 "bomb cyclone" that produced widespread damage and outages across western Washington. Such events are typically driven by rapid surface cyclogenesis over the eastern North Pacific, often associated with bent-back fronts and so-called "sting jet" mesoscale wind features along the southern flank of an approaching low.

== Other phenomena ==
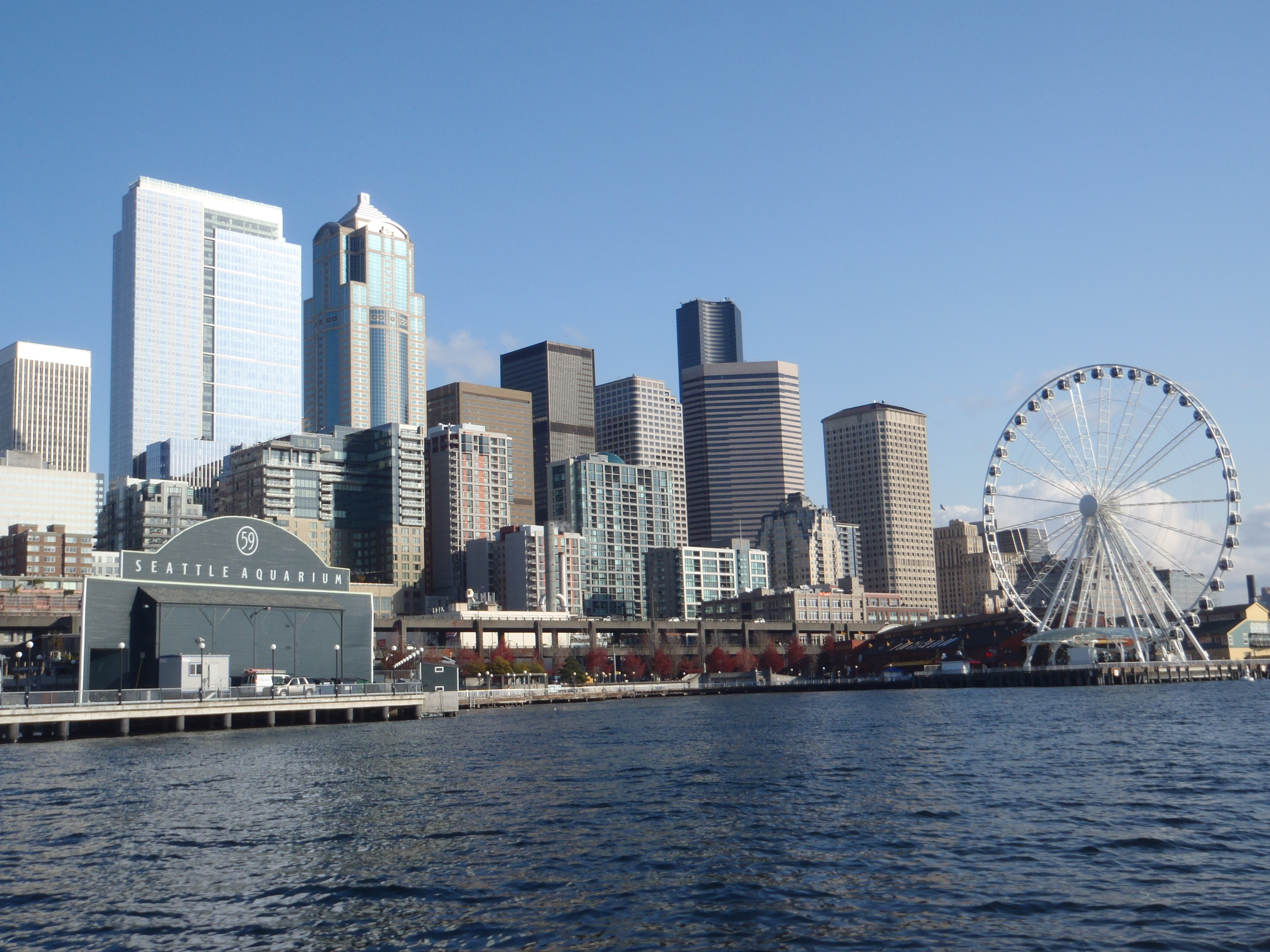
Downtown Seattle averages 71 completely sunny days a year, with most of those days occurring between May and September

=== Sunshine, UV and daylight ===
The city generally experiences cloudy conditions, with clear days occurring infrequently. As a result of the city's latitude, it experiences a moderate difference in daylight hours between summer and winter, though is not subject to the extremes of cities further north. The Seattle area is the cloudiest region of the United States, due in part to frequent storms and lows moving in from the adjacent Pacific Ocean. Seattle is cloudy 201 days out of the year and partly cloudy 93 days. (Official weather and climatic data is collected at Seattle–Tacoma International Airport, located about 19 km (12 mi) south of downtown in the city of SeaTac, which is at a higher elevation, and records more cloudy days and fewer partly cloudy days per year.)

Climate data for Seattle
Month	Jan	Feb	Mar	Apr	May	Jun	Jul	Aug	Sep	Oct	Nov	Dec	Year
Mean monthly sunshine hours	69.8	108.8	178.4	207.3	253.7	268.4	312.0	281.4	221.7	142.6	72.7	52.9	2,169.7
Mean daily daylight hours	9.0	10.3	12.0	13.7	15.2	15.9	15.5	14.2	12.5	10.8	9.3	8.5	12.2
Percentage possible sunshine	25	38	48	51	54	56	65	64	59	42	26	20	49
Average ultraviolet index	1	2	3	5	6	7	7	6	5	3	1	1	4
Source 1: NOAA (relative humidity and sun 1961–1990)
Source 2: Weather Atlas

=== Puget Sound Convergence Zone ===
The Puget Sound Convergence Zone is an important feature of Seattle's weather. In the convergence zone, air arriving from the north meets air flowing in from the south. Both streams of air originate over the Pacific Ocean; airflow is split by the Olympic Mountains to Seattle's west, then reunited to the east. When the air currents meet, they are forced upward, resulting in convection. Thunderstorms caused by this activity are usually weak and can occur north and south of town, but Seattle itself rarely receives more than occasional thunder and small hail showers.

== Variability and teleconnections ==
Year-to-year variability in Seattle's cool-season precipitation and temperature is strongly modulated by the El Niño–Southern Oscillation (ENSO) and the Pacific Decadal Oscillation (PDO). During El Niño winters, the Aleutian Low typically deepens and shifts eastward, while the polar jet stream is displaced southward, steering storms toward California and leaving the Pacific Northwest warmer and drier than normal. La Niña winters generally bring a stronger and more northwesterly storm track to Washington, with cooler temperatures and above-average mountain snowpack. Because the Cascades supply the bulk of the regional summer water through gradual snowmelt, El Niño winters can reduce snowpack to the point of producing summer water shortages and diminished hydroelectric output. Modeling studies suggest that extreme Aleutian Low events may become more frequent and persistent under continued anthropogenic warming, with associated changes in regional precipitation and temperature patterns.

== Climate change ==
Being a coastal city, Seattle may experience significant effects from rising sea levels. The sea has risen by 6 inches (15 cm) in the past century, and is expected to rise 28 inches (71 cm) by 2100 and 47 inches (120 cm) by 2150. It is expected that by this time, frequent flooding will become a problem, with now-annual extreme king tide's becoming monthly or even daily events.

=== Temperature ===
The temperature in Seattle has generally increased steadily and this trend is expected to continue due to anthropogenic warming. For the last century, the average has increased roughly 0.3 degrees Fahrenheit each decade. By the end of the century, it is predicted that there will be on average around two weeks of 90 °F (32 °C) days each year.

Homes in the area have historically not used air conditioning due to the temperate summer climate; the United States Census Bureau found that 31 percent of households in the Seattle metropolitan area used air conditioning. Several major heat waves in the 2010s and 2020s, including the June 2021 heat dome that set record temperatures in the state, led to a large increase in air conditioning use. By the end of 2021, the Census Bureau's biannual housing survey found that 53 percent of households in the metropolitan area had air conditioning.

=== Precipitation ===
Precipitation in the city has increased slightly, but this trend is expected to continue. Extreme rainfall events have become more frequent over the previous years and this trend is also expected to continue.

== Station data ==
Climate data for Seattle (SeaTac Airport), 1991–2020 normals, (Note: Mean monthly maxima and minima (i.e. the highest and lowest temperature readings during an entire month or year) calculated based on data at said location from 1991 to 2020.) extremes 1894–present (Note: Official records are restricted to SeaTac Airport from January 1945 onward.)
Month	Jan	Feb	Mar	Apr	May	Jun	Jul	Aug	Sep	Oct	Nov	Dec	Year
Record high °F (°C)	67 (19)	70 (21)	79 (26)	89 (32)	93 (34)	108 (42)	103 (39)	99 (37)	98 (37)	89 (32)	74 (23)	66 (19)	108 (42)
Mean maximum °F (°C)	57.0 (13.9)	59.1 (15.1)	66.4 (19.1)	74.3 (23.5)	81.9 (27.7)	85.8 (29.9)	91.2 (32.9)	89.9 (32.2)	84.1 (28.9)	72.0 (22.2)	61.6 (16.4)	56.8 (13.8)	94.1 (34.5)
Mean daily maximum °F (°C)	48.0 (8.9)	50.3 (10.2)	54.2 (12.3)	59.3 (15.2)	66.3 (19.1)	71.1 (21.7)	77.4 (25.2)	77.6 (25.3)	71.6 (22.0)	60.5 (15.8)	52.1 (11.2)	47.0 (8.3)	61.3 (16.3)
Daily mean °F (°C)	42.8 (6.0)	44.0 (6.7)	47.1 (8.4)	51.3 (10.7)	57.5 (14.2)	62.0 (16.7)	67.1 (19.5)	67.4 (19.7)	62.6 (17.0)	53.8 (12.1)	46.5 (8.1)	42.0 (5.6)	53.7 (12.1)
Mean daily minimum °F (°C)	37.7 (3.2)	37.7 (3.2)	39.9 (4.4)	43.3 (6.3)	48.7 (9.3)	53.0 (11.7)	56.8 (13.8)	57.2 (14.0)	53.6 (12.0)	47.0 (8.3)	40.9 (4.9)	37.1 (2.8)	46.1 (7.8)
Mean minimum °F (°C)	26.1 (−3.3)	27.3 (−2.6)	31.3 (−0.4)	35.6 (2.0)	40.6 (4.8)	46.6 (8.1)	51.5 (10.8)	51.7 (10.9)	45.8 (7.7)	36.8 (2.7)	29.2 (−1.6)	25.4 (−3.7)	21.5 (−5.8)
Record low °F (°C)	0 (−18)	1 (−17)	11 (−12)	29 (−2)	28 (−2)	38 (3)	43 (6)	44 (7)	35 (2)	28 (−2)	6 (−14)	6 (−14)	0 (−18)
Average precipitation inches (mm)	5.78 (147)	3.76 (96)	4.17 (106)	3.18 (81)	1.88 (48)	1.45 (37)	0.60 (15)	0.97 (25)	1.61 (41)	3.91 (99)	6.31 (160)	5.72 (145)	39.34 (999)
Average snowfall inches (cm)	1.8 (4.6)	2.2 (5.6)	0.4 (1.0)	0.0 (0.0)	0.0 (0.0)	0.0 (0.0)	0.0 (0.0)	0.0 (0.0)	0.0 (0.0)	0.0 (0.0)	0.2 (0.51)	1.7 (4.3)	6.3 (16)
Average precipitation days (≥ 0.01 in)	18.7	15.9	17.1	15.0	11.3	9.2	4.7	4.9	8.3	14.3	18.4	18.4	156.2
Average snowy days (≥ 0.1 in)	1.4	1.2	0.4	0.0	0.0	0.0	0.0	0.0	0.0	0.0	0.2	1.5	4.7
Average relative humidity (%)	78.0	75.2	73.6	71.4	68.9	67.1	65.4	68.2	73.2	78.6	79.8	80.1	73.3
Average dew point °F (°C)	33.1 (0.6)	35.1 (1.7)	36.3 (2.4)	38.8 (3.8)	43.5 (6.4)	48.2 (9.0)	51.4 (10.8)	52.7 (11.5)	50.2 (10.1)	45.1 (7.3)	38.8 (3.8)	34.3 (1.3)	42.3 (5.7)
Mean monthly sunshine hours	69.8	108.8	178.4	207.3	253.7	268.4	312.0	281.4	221.7	142.6	72.7	52.9	2,169.7
Percentage possible sunshine	25	38	48	51	54	56	65	64	59	42	26	20	49
Average ultraviolet index	0.8	1.5	2.8	4.5	6.0	6.9	7.3	6.2	4.4	2.3	1.1	0.7	3.7
Source 1: NOAA (relative humidity, dew point and sun 1961–1990)
Source 2: UV Index Today (1995 to 2022)

See or edit raw graph data.
