= Brummel & Brown =

European butter spread

Brummel & Brown is the name of butter spread that was introduced by Van den Bergh Foods (later Unilever) in 1994 and now produced by Flora Food Group. In 2000, Brummel & Brown introduced a line of creamy fruit spreads, such as Strawberry Fruit Spread, and Blueberry Fruit Spread. The spread contains 10% nonfat yogurt and 35% vegetable oil. Water is the top listed ingredient in the margarine spread, but not in the fruit spread which lists high fructose corn syrup, water, strawberries, and sugar within its top 7 ingredients.

== Marketing ==
The name, the package design concept, and the advertising campaign were created by Stone & Simons, an advertising agency. The advertising for Brummel & Brown received the Unilever Award for Brand Communications 2000 - Gold and the American Marketing Association Edison Award the year the product was introduced. From 1994 to 1997, Brummel & Brown used the slogan "Must "B" The Yogurt". From 1997 to 2000, Brummel & Brown used the slogan "Must "B" Brummel & Brown".

== Ingredients and nutritional information ==
In decreasing order Brummel & Brown Spread contains water; vegetable oil blend (liquid soybean oil, palm oil, palm kernel oil, liquid canola oil); salt; gelatin; nonfat yogurt (cultured nonfat milk); natural soy lecithin; vegetable mono and diglycerides (potassium sorbate, E202, a preservative; calcium disodium EDTA) used to protect quality; lactic acid; artificial flavors; vitamin A (palmitate); beta carotene (colour).

Nutrition Information for a serving size of 1 tablespoon (14g):

- Calories: 45
- Calories from Fat: 45
- Total fat 5g, 8% of the daily value
- Saturated fat 1.5g, 8% of the daily value
- Trans fat 0g
- Polyunsaturated fat 2.5g
- Monounsaturated fat 1.0g
- Cholesterol 0 mg, 0% of the daily value
- Sodium 90 mg, 4% of the daily value
- Total carbohydrate 0g, 0% of the daily value
- Dietary fiber 0g, 0% of the daily value
- Sugars 0g
- Vitamin A, 10% of the daily value
- Vitamin C, 0% of the daily value
- Calcium, 0% of the daily value
- Iron, 0% of the daily value
- Percent daily values are based on a 2,000-calorie diet.

== External links and further reading ==
- Home page Brummel & Brown
