= Irrigon Junior/Senior High School =

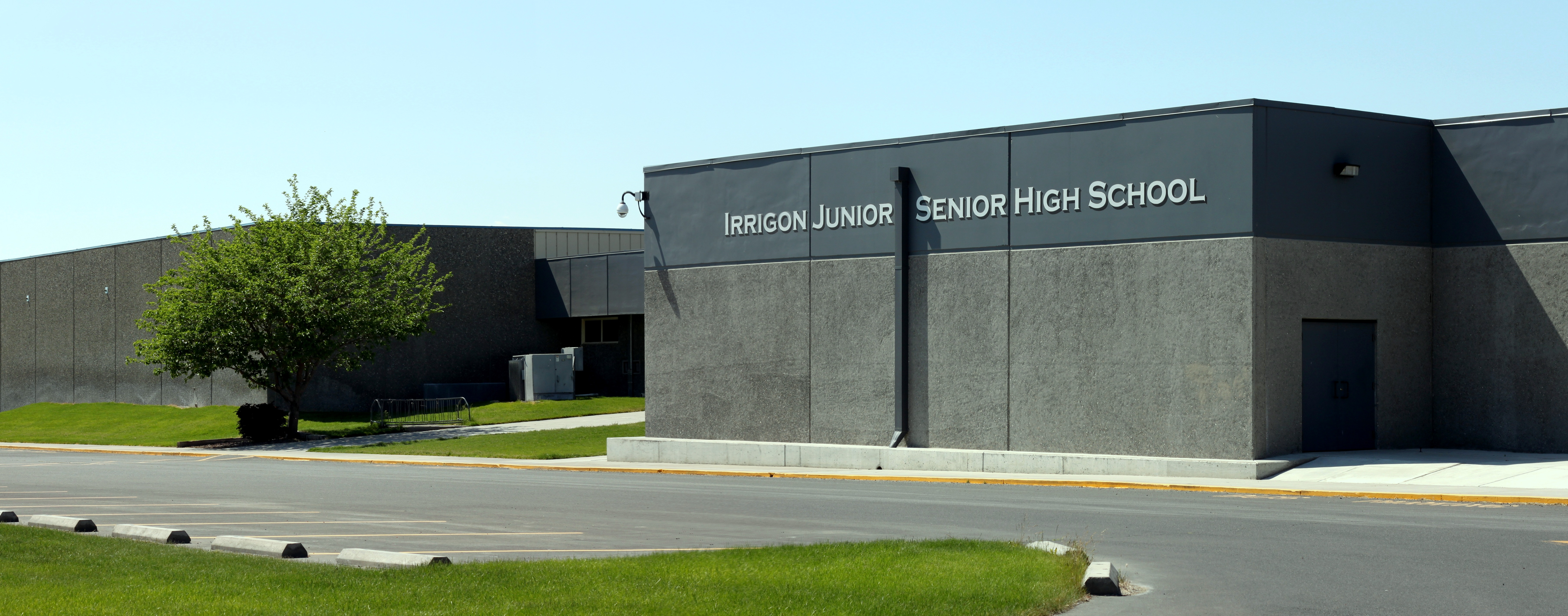

Location
- 315 E Wyoming Avenue; Irrigon, (Morrow County), Oregon 97844; United States
- 45.887477°N 119.498098°W

Information
- Type: Public
- School district: Morrow School District
- Principal: Rose Palmer
- Grades: 7-12
- Enrollment: 345 (2024-2025)
- Colors: Black, silver, and burnt orange
- Athletics conference: OSAA Blue Mountain Conference 3A-5
- Mascot: Knight
- Website: ihs.morrow.k12.or.us

Irrigon Junior/Senior High School is a public high school in Irrigon, Oregon, United States. The school is most known for its 2014 and 2015 men's basketball team, who went back to back in state championships in the 2A league.

== Academics ==
In 2008, 95% of the school's seniors received their high school diploma. Of 56 students, 53 graduated, two dropped out, and one was still in high school the following year.
