= Bromell =

Bromell is a surname. Notable people with the surname include:

- Craig Bromell (born 1959), Canadian radio personality
- John Bromell (1940–2013), Australian Drummer and Music Publisher
- Henry Bromell (1947–2013), American writer and screenwriter
- Lorenzo Bromell (born 1975), American football player
- Tony Bromell (born 1932), Irish educationist and politician
- Trayvon Bromell (born 1995), American sprinter
