= Brumel =

Brumel may refer to:

- Antoine Brumel (c.1460 – c.1515), Franco-Flemish Renaissance composer
- Jacques Brunel (died 1564), also known as Giaches Brumel, 16th century French organist and composer
- Valeriy Brumel (1942–2003), Soviet-Russian athlete in the high jump, and writer

== See also ==
- Beau Brummell
