= 2010 Seattle Storm season =

- WNBA champions
- Head coach: Brian Agler
- Arena: KeyArena

Results
- Record: 28–6 (.824)
- Place: 1st (Western)
- Playoff finish: Won WNBA Finals (3-0) vs Atlanta Dream

Media
- Television: KONG, KING; NBATV, ESPN2
- Radio: KKNW

The 2010 WNBA season was the 11th season for the Seattle Storm of the Women's National Basketball Association. The Storm won their second WNBA championship.

== Transactions ==
=== Dispersal draft ===
Based on the Storm's 2009 record, they would pick 10th in the Sacramento Monarchs dispersal draft. The Storm picked Chelsea Newton.

=== WNBA draft ===
The following are the Storm's selections in the 2010 WNBA draft.

Round	Pick	Player	Nationality	School/team/country
1	10	Alison Lacey	Australia	Iowa State
2	22	Tanisha Smith	United States	Texas A&M
3	34	Tijana Krivacevic	Hungary	Hungary

=== Transaction log ===
- February 4: The Storm signed Chelsea Newton.
- February 9: The Storm signed free agent Le'coe Willingham.
- March 3: The Storm signed Jana Vesela to a training camp contract.
- March 11: The Storm re-signed Lauren Jackson.
- March 17: The Storm signed Davanei Hampton to a training camp contract.
- April 1: The Storm signed Abby Bishop, Laura Kurz and Aja Parham to training camp contracts.
- April 6: The Storm signed Lindsey Wilson to a training camp contract.
- April 8: The Storm announced that Katie Gearlds would sit out the 2010 season.
- April 14: The Storm signed Loree Moore to a training camp contract.
- April 20: The Storm signed Ashley Robinson and Heather Bowman to training camp contracts.
- April 22: The Storm signed Svetlana Abrosimova and released Janell Burse.
- April 30: The Storm waived Tanisha Smith.
- May 6: The Storm waived Heather Bowman.
- May 10: The Storm waived Devanei Hampton and Lindsey Wilson.
- May 11: The Storm waived Laura Kurz.
- May 14: The Storm waived Aja Parham, Loree Moore and Ashley Walker.

=== Free agents ===
==== Additions ====
Player	Signed	Former team
Le'coe Willingham	February 9, 2010	Phoenix Mercury
Jana Vesela	March 3, 2010	free agent
Lauren Jackson	March 11, 2010	re-signed
Abby Bishop	April 1, 2010	free agent
Ashley Robinson	April 20, 2010	re-signed
Svetlana Abrosimova	April 22, 2010	free agent

==== Subtractions ====
Player	Left	New team
Katie Gearlds	April 8, 2010	hiatus
Janell Burse	April 22, 2010	free agent
Ashley Walker	May 14, 2010	free agent

== Roster ==
2010 Seattle Storm roster
Players
Coaches

Pos.	No.	Nat.	Name	Height	Weight	From
G/F	25	(Russia)	Abrosimova, Svetlana	6' 2" (1.88m)	169 lb (77kg)	Connecticut
PG	10	(United States)	Bird, Sue	5' 9" (1.75m)	150 lb (68kg)	Connecticut
F	5	(Australia)	Bishop, Abby	6' 3" (1.91m)	191 lb (87kg)	Australia
SF	2	(United States)	Cash, Swin	6' 1" (1.85m)	162 lb (73kg)	Connecticut
F/C	15	(Australia)	Jackson, Lauren	6' 5" (1.96m)	187 lb (85kg)	Australia
G	40	(Australia)	Lacey, Alison	6' 0" (1.83m)	159 lb (72kg)	Iowa State
PF	20	(United States)	Little, Camille	6' 2" (1.88m)	180 lb (82kg)	North Carolina
C	43	(United States)	Robinson, Ashley	6' 4" (1.93m)	180 lb (82kg)	Tennessee
F	7	(Czech Republic)	Veselá, Jana	6' 3" (1.91m)	195 lb (88kg)	Czech Republic
PF	34	(United States)	Willingham, Le'coe	6' 0" (1.83m)	200 lb (91kg)	Auburn
PG	30	(United States)	Wright, Tanisha	5' 11" (1.8m)	165 lb (75kg)	Penn State

Head coach
(United States) Brian Agler (Wittenberg)
Assistant coaches
(United States) Jenny Boucek (Virginia)
(United States) Nancy Darsch (Springfield)
Athletic trainer
(United States) Tom Spencer (Central Washington)
Strength and conditioning coach
(United States) Melissa Hardin

Legend

- (C) Team captain
- (DP) Unsigned draft pick
- (FA) Free agent
- (S) Suspended
- Injured

WNBA roster page

=== Depth ===
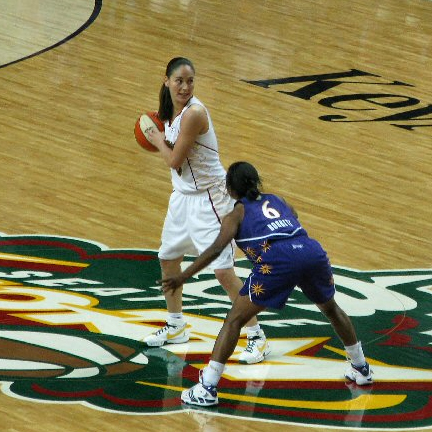
Sue Bird, on offense

Pos.	Starter	Bench
C	Camille Little	Ashley Robinson / Abby Bishop
PF	Lauren Jackson	Le'coe Willingham / Jana Vesela
SF	Swin Cash	Alison Lacey
SG	Tanisha Wright	Svetlana Abrosimova
PG	Sue Bird

== Season standings ==
Western Conference	W	L	PCT	GB	Home	Road	Conf.
Seattle Storm ^{x}	28	6	.824	–	17–0	11–6	20–2
Phoenix Mercury ^{x}	15	19	.441	13.0	9–8	6–11	13–9
San Antonio Silver Stars ^{x}	14	20	.412	14.0	8–9	6–11	11–11
Los Angeles Sparks ^{x}	13	21	.382	15.0	8–9	5–12	10–12
Minnesota Lynx ^{o}	13	21	.382	15.0	7–10	6–11	8–14
Tulsa Shock ^{o}	6	28	.176	22.0	4–13	2–15	4–18

== Schedule ==
=== Preseason ===
2010 Game Log: Preseason

Game	Date	Time (ET)	Opponent	Score	High points	High rebounds	High assists	Location/Attendance	Record
1	May 2	4:00pm	Phoenix	77–58	Walker (17)	Walker (6)	Lacey (5)	KeyArena; 4,912	1–0
2	May 9	2:00pm	@ Tulsa	80–90	Jackson (15)	Cash (7)	Wright (4)	BOK Center; N/A	1–1

=== Regular season ===
2010 Game Log: Regular Season
May

Game	Date	Time (ET)	Opponent	TV	Score	High points	High rebounds	High assists	Location/Attendance	Record
1	May 16	9:00pm	Los Angeles	KONG	81–67	Jackson (23)	Jackson (10)	Bird (4)	KeyArena; 9,686	1–0
2	May 19	10:00pm	Minnesota	KING	79–76	Cash (24)	Jackson (8)	Bird (10)	KeyArena; 6,687	2–0
3	May 22	10:00pm	@ Phoenix		95–89 (OT)	Jackson (25)	Wright (9)	Bird (8)	US Airways Center; 10,144	3–0
4	May 25	10:00pm	Washington		82–76	Bird, Wright (16)	Jackson (7)	Bird (7)	KeyArena; 6,612	4–0
5	May 27	8:00pm	@ Chicago	CN100	75–84	Jackson (15)	Jackson (11)	Bird (4)	Allstate Arena; 2,923	4–1
6	May 30	3:00pm	@ San Antonio		84–56	Jackson (27)	Cash (8)	Bird (6)	AT&T Center; 4,924	5–1

June

Game	Date	Time (ET)	Opponent	TV	Score	High points	High rebounds	High assists	Location/Attendance	Record
7	June 1	9:30pm	Atlanta	ESPN2	90–72	Jackson (32)	Jackson (10)	Bird (6)	KeyArena; 7,586	6–1
8	June 5	11:00pm	@ Los Angeles	NBATV; FS-W	79–75	Bird (22)	Jackson (9)	Bird (6)	Home Depot Center; 6,026	7–1
9	June 6	9:00pm	Phoenix	KONG	97–74	Cash, Jackson, Little (16)	Abrosimova (7)	Bird (11)	KeyArena; 7,827	8–1
10	June 11	10:00pm	Los Angeles	KONG	82–60	Jackson (17)	Jackson (9)	Bird (5)	KeyArena; 7,286	9–1
11	June 17	7:00pm	@ Indiana	FS-I	65–72	Jackson (17)	Jackson (9)	Cash (4)	Conseco Fieldhouse; 7,520	9–2
12	June 18	7:30pm	@ New York		92–84	Bird (22)	Jackson (12)	Bird (10)	Madison Square Garden; 8,883	10–2
13	June 20	9:00pm	San Antonio	NBATV; FS-SW	82–61	Cash (22)	Jackson (14)	Wright (6)	KeyArena; 8,086	11–2
14	June 25	10:00pm	Indiana		85–81	Jackson (28)	Jackson (7)	Wright (10)	KeyArena; 9,083	12–2
15	June 27	4:00pm	@ Tulsa	COX	83–72	Jackson (24)	Little (9)	Wright (10)	BOK Center; 4,865	13–2
16	June 29	10:00pm	San Antonio		86–72	Jackson (31)	Jackson (15)	Wright (12)	KeyArena; 7,823	14–2

July

Game	Date	Time (ET)	Opponent	TV	Score	High points	High rebounds	High assists	Location/Attendance	Record
17	July 3	5:00pm	@ Los Angeles	ESPN2	75–62	Jackson (20)	Cash, Jackson (8)	Bird (7)	STAPLES Center; 9,319	15–2
18	July 6	3:00pm	New York		78–70	Cash (20)	Cash (11)	Little, Wright (4)	KeyArena; 11,012	16–2
19	July 14	3:30pm	@ Phoenix	FS-A	111–107 (3OT)	Jackson (31)	Jackson (18)	Bird (8)	US Airways Center; 13,508	17–2
20	July 17	3:30pm	@ Minnesota		73–71	Jackson (26)	Cash (11)	Wright (10)	Target Center; 7,216	18–2
21	July 20	12:30pm	@ San Antonio	NBATV; FS-SW	80–74	Jackson (21)	Cash, Jackson (7)	Wright (7)	AT&T Center; 12,414	19–2
22	July 25	9:00pm	Tulsa	KONG	75–59	Jackson (16)	Willingham (10)	Bird, Wright (6)	KeyArena; 9,686	20–2
23	July 27	9:30pm	Phoenix	ESPN2	91–85	Jackson (33)	Jackson (11)	Bird (7)	KeyArena; 8,044	21–2
24	July 29	10:00pm	Chicago	NBATV; KONG	80–60	Cash (16)	Little, Willingham (7)	Bird (8)	KeyArena; 7,749	22–2

August

Game	Date	Time (ET)	Opponent	TV	Score	High points	High rebounds	High assists	Location/Attendance	Record
25	August 1	7:00pm	@ Minnesota	NBATV; FS-N	71–72	Bird (16)	Robinson (7)	Bird (10)	Target Center; 7,312	22–3
26	August 3	8:00pm	@ Tulsa	COX	75–84	Bird (19)	Bird (7)	Wright (7)	BOK Center; 3,697	22–4
27	August 5	10:30pm	Connecticut	ESPN2	83–82	Jackson (31)	Jackson (8)	Bird (6)	KeyArena; 7,538	23–4
28	August 7	10:00pm	Tulsa	KONG	111–65	Abrosimova (20)	Jackson (10)	Abrosimova (8)	KeyArena; 9,686	24–4
29	August 10	7:00pm	@ Atlanta	FS-S	80–70	Jackson, Wright (14)	Jackson (8)	Abrosimova (6)	Philips Arena; 6,042	25–4
30	August 13	7:30pm	@ Connecticut		68–88	Abrosmiova (19)	Robinson (7)	Abrosimova (6)	Mohegan Sun Arena; 9,197	25–5
31	August 15	4:00pm	@ Washington		71–80	Cash (15)	Abrosimova, Willingham (6)	Bird (7)	Verizon Center; 9,438	25–6
32	August 17	10:00pm	Minnesota		68–64	Jackson (24)	Little (14)	Bird (8)	KeyArena; 7,394	26–6
33	August 20	10:00pm	@ Phoenix		78–73	Cash (13)	Bird (7)	Bird (5)	US Airways Center; 12,459	27–6
34	August 21	11:00pm	Los Angeles	ESPN2	75–74	Little (22)	Cash (7)	Bird (9)	KeyArena; 9,686	28–6

All games are viewable on WNBA LiveAccess

=== Postseason ===
2010 Game Log: Postseason
Western Conference Semifinals

Game	Date	Time (ET)	Opponent	TV	Score	High points	High rebounds	High assists	Location/Attendance	Series
1	August 25	11:00pm	Los Angeles	ESPN2	79–66	Cash (20)	Jackson (9)	Bird (12)	KeyArena; 10,589	1–0
2	August 28	3:00pm	@ Los Angeles	ESPN2	81–66	Jackson (24)	Jackson (9)	Cash (5)	STAPLES Center; 8,326	2–0

Western Conference Finals

Game	Date	Time (ET)	Opponent	TV	Score	High points	High rebounds	High assists	Location/Attendance	Series
1	September 2	10:00pm	Phoenix	NBATV	82–74	Jackson (23)	Jackson (17)	Bird (10)	KeyArena; 9,686	1–0
2	September 5	3:00pm	@ Phoenix	ABC	91–88	Cash (28)	Cash, Jackson, Little (8)	Bird (8)	US Airways Center; 9,010	2–0

WNBA Finals

Game	Date	Time (ET)	Opponent	TV	Score	High points	High rebounds	High assists	Location/Attendance	Series
1	September 12	3:00pm	Atlanta	ABC	79–77	Jackson (26)	Little (11)	Bird (8)	KeyArena; 15,084	1–0
2	September 14	9:00pm	Atlanta	ESPN2	87–84	Jackson (26)	Little (9)	Bird (5)	KeyArena; 13,898	2–0
3	September 16	8:00pm	@ Atlanta	ESPN2	87–84	Cash (18)	Jackson (9)	Bird (7)	Philips Arena; 10,522	3–0

== Statistics ==
Legend
GP	Games played	GS	Games started	MPG	Minutes per game	RPG	Rebounds per game
APG	Assists per game	SPG	Steals per game	BPG	Blocks per game	PPG	Points per game
FG%	Field-goal percentage	3P%	3-point field-goal percentage	FT%	Free-throw percentage	TO	Turnovers per game
PF	Fouls per game		Team leader		League leader

=== Regular season ===
Player	GP	GS	MPG	FG%	3P%	FT%	RPG	APG	SPG	BPG	PPG
Svetlana Abrosimova	34	1	20.2	.415	.376	.568	3.1	2.0	1.18	0.09	7.6
Sue Bird	33	33	30.5	.434	.399	.857	2.7	5.8	1.52	0.15	11.1
Abby Bishop	16	0	6.8	.356	.250	.545	1.3	0.3	0.13	0.06	2.8
Swin Cash	34	34	30.8	.435	.407	.807	6.0	2.0	0.56	0.50	13.8
Lauren Jackson	32	32	31.0	.462	.346	.910	8.3	1.2	0.94	1.19	20.5
Alison Lacey	21	0	6.9	.114	.111	1.000	0.8	0.5	0.29	0.05	0.8
Camille Little	34	34	24.6	.500	.348	.711	5.2	1.4	1.62	0.62	10.1
Ashley Robinson	30	0	8.2	.413	.000	.333	1.9	0.5	0.13	0.70	1.4
Jana Veselá	29	0	11.4	.547	.400	.800	2.0	0.6	0.62	0.24	3.2
Le'coe Willingham	33	2	15.6	.538	.452	.667	4.1	0.7	0.48	0.15	5.5
Tanisha Wright	34	34	29.1	.410	.411	.844	3.3	4.5	1.21	0.26	9.2

== Awards and honors ==
- Lauren Jackson was named WNBA Western Conference Player of the Week for the week of May 15, 2010.
- Lauren Jackson was named WNBA Western Conference Player of the Week for the week of May 29, 2010.
- Lauren Jackson was named WNBA Western Conference Player of the Week for the week of June 19, 2010.
- Lauren Jackson was named WNBA Western Conference Player of the Week for the week of June 26, 2010.
- Lauren Jackson was named WNBA Western Conference Player of the Week for the week of July 10, 2010.
- Lauren Jackson was named WNBA Western Conference Player of the Month for May.
- Lauren Jackson was named WNBA Western Conference Player of the Month for June.
- Lauren Jackson was named WNBA Western Conference Player of the Month for July.
- Sue Bird was named to the 2010 WNBA All-Star Team as a Team USA starter.
- Swin Cash was named to the 2010 WNBA All-Star Team as a Team USA reserve.
- Lauren Jackson was named to the 2010 WNBA All-Star Team as a WNBA reserve.
- Tanisha Wright was named to the All-Defensive First Team.
- Lauren Jackson was named to the All-Defensive Second Team.
- Lauren Jackson was named to the All-WNBA First Team.
- Sue Bird was named to the All-WNBA Second Team.
- Brian Agler was named Coach of the Year.
- Lauren Jackson was named Most Valuable Player.
- Lauren Jackson was named Finals Most Valuable Player.
