= 2010 NCAA Women's Basketball All-Americans =

The following are the First, Second, and Third Team selections by the Associated Press.

== First team ==
- Maya Moore, Connecticut, 6-0, Junior
- Tina Charles, Connecticut, 6-4, Senior
- Kelsey Griffin, Nebraska, 6-2, Senior
- Monica Wright, Virginia, 5-11, Senior
- Jantel Lavender, Ohio State, 6-4, Junior

== Second Team ==
- Andrea Riley, Oklahoma State, 5-5, Senior
- Nnemkadi Ogwumike, Stanford, 6-2, Sophomore
- Jayne Appel, Stanford, 6-4, Senior
- Alysha Clark, Middle Tennessee, 5-10, Senior
- Brittney Griner, Baylor, 6-8, Freshman

== Third Team ==
- Danielle Robinson, Oklahoma, 5-9, Junior
- Jasmine Thomas, Duke, 5-9, Junior
- Victoria Dunlap, Kentucky, 6-1, Junior
- Elena Delle Donne, Delaware, 6-5, Freshman
- Amber Harris, Xavier, 6-4, Junior

== Honorable Mention ==
- Danielle Adams, Texas A&M
- Kachine Alexander, Iowa
- Angie Bjorklund, Tennessee
- Allyssa DeHaan, Michigan State
- Skylar Diggins, Notre Dame
- Dawn Evans, James Madison
- Rachele Fitz, Marist
- Tyra Grant, Penn State
- Alexis Gray-Lawson, California
- Kalana Greene, Connecticut
- Allison Hightower, LSU
- Alison Lacey, Iowa State
- Judie Lomax, Columbia
- Kevi Luper, Oral Roberts
- Gabriela Marginiean, Drexel
- Nicole Michael, Syracuse
- Jacinta Monroe, Florida State
- Kayla Pedersen, Stanford
- Ta'Shia Phillips, Xavier
- Samantha Prahalis, Ohio State
- Chastity Reed, Arkansas-Little Rock
- Sugar Rodgers, Georgetown
- Lindsey Schraeder, Notre Dame
- Tanisha Smith, Texas A&M.
