= Courtney Vandersloot =

American basketball player (born 1989)

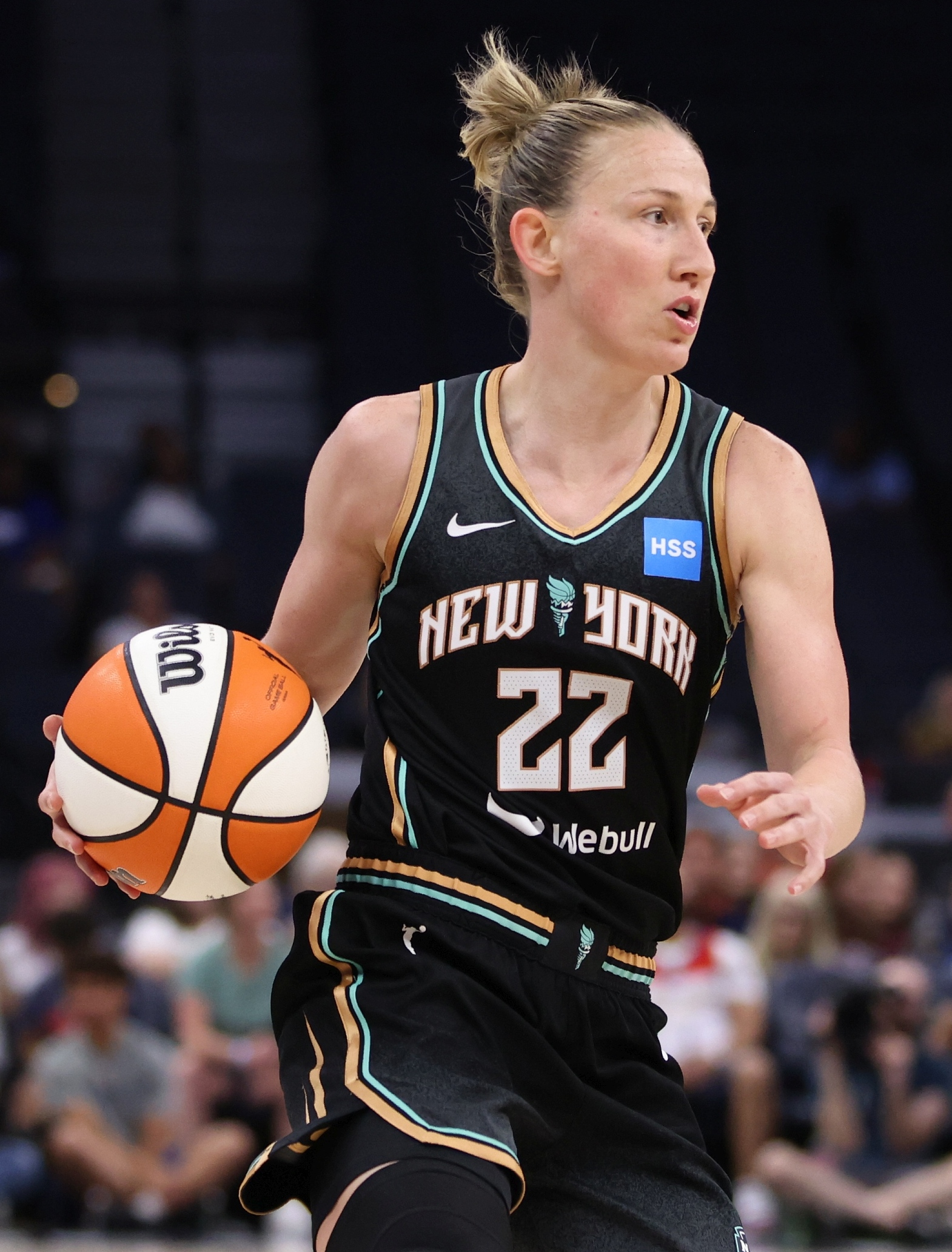
- Vandersloot with the New York Liberty in 2023

No. 22 – Chicago Sky
- Position: Point guard
- League: WNBA

Personal information
- Born: February 8, 1989 (age 37) Kent, Washington, U.S.
- Listed height: 5 ft 8 in (1.73 m)
- Listed weight: 137 lb (62 kg)

Career information
- High school: Kentwood (Kent, Washington)
- College: Gonzaga (2007–2011)
- WNBA draft: 2011: 1st round, 3rd overall pick
- Drafted by: Chicago Sky
- Playing career: 2011–present

Career history
- 2011–2022: Chicago Sky
- 2011–2014: Beşiktaş
- 2014–2015: Wisla Can Pack
- 2015–2016: Beşiktaş
- 2016–2018: Yakin Dogu
- 2018–2022: UMMC Ekaterinburg
- 2023: Fenerbahçe
- 2023–2024: New York Liberty
- 2025: Mist BC
- 2025–present: Chicago Sky

Career highlights
- 2× WNBA champion (2021, 2024); 5× WNBA All-Star (2011, 2019, 2021-2023); WNBA All-Rookie Team (2011); 2× All-WNBA First Team (2019, 2020); 3× All-WNBA Second Team (2015, 2018, 2021); 7× WNBA assists leader (2014, 2017–2021, 2023); 7× WNBA Peak Performer (2015, 2017–2021, 2023); WNBA Commissioner's Cup Champion (2023); 3× EuroLeague champion (2019, 2021, 2023); Turkish National League MVP (2017); 2× Turkish National League champion (2017, 2023); Frances Pomeroy Naismith Award (2011); Nancy Lieberman Award (2011); Second-team All-American – AP (2011); State Farm Coaches' All-American (2011); All-American – USBWA (2011); 3× WCC Player of the Year (2009–2011); 3× WCC tournament MVP (2009–2011); 4× All-WCC (2008–2011); WCC All-Freshman Team (2008); WCC Newcomer of the Year (2008); No. 21 retired by Gonzaga Bulldogs; 2× NCAA season assists leader (2010, 2011)
- Stats at WNBA.com
- Stats at Basketball Reference

Courtney Vandersloot (born February 8, 1989) is an American professional basketball player for the Chicago Sky of the Women's National Basketball Association (WNBA). She is a five-time WNBA All-Star and two-time WNBA champion. She has also played for UMMC Ekaterinburg in the Russian Premier League, Mist BC in Unrivaled, and teams in several other professional leagues. She is regarded as one of the greatest WNBA point guards of all time.

Vandersloot played college basketball for the Gonzaga Bulldogs, holding numerous records and becoming the first player to have her number retired by the program. She was the only West Coast Conference women's player to be named Player of the Year and tournament MVP three times. In her final season, she led the Bulldogs to their first-ever Elite Eight appearance, and won the Frances Pomeroy Naismith Award and Nancy Lieberman Award. She is the first Division I player to record 2,000 points and 1,000 assists in a career.

She was drafted by the Sky with the third pick in the 2011 WNBA draft. She was named an All-Star and to the All-Rookie Team in her rookie year, and was named an All-Star again in 2019, 2021, 2022, and 2023. She led the Sky to their first WNBA championship in 2021. In 2023, she signed with the New York Liberty and helped the team win their first championship in 2024. In 2025, she returned to the Sky.

Playing the point guard position, Vandersloot ranks second in WNBA regular-season total assists (behind Sue Bird) and second in total playoff assists (behind Alyssa Thomas). She led the WNBA in assists in 2014, 2017–2021, and 2023. She holds the all-time WNBA records for assists-per-game in a season (10.0) and a career (6.6). She also holds several Sky franchise records, including the most games played, most points scored, most assists, and most steals.

Vandersloot has represented the Hungary women's national basketball team internationally, playing for Hungary in EuroBasket Women 2017.

== Early life ==
Born in the Seattle suburb of Kent, Washington to parents who both worked for Boeing, Vandersloot grew up in a neighborhood with many children her age, and said in a 2011 interview that "all we did was play sports, all sports." Her father built a sports court with a basketball goal behind the family house, but she almost never played there, choosing instead to play at a hoop in front of a neighbor's house where she could easily be seen by other children in the neighborhood. She regularly played against boys. During the third grade, she wrote a school paper about her dreams of one day playing in the WNBA.

While Vandersloot regularly played basketball and many other sports as a child—she was also on a fast-pitch softball team that was runner-up in a Washington state tournament at age 11— her favorite sport was soccer; she had a poster of Mia Hamm on her bedroom wall. She did not concentrate on basketball until high school:

I grew up wanting to go to North Carolina because of Mia Hamm. Once I got into high school and basketball started interfering with club soccer I found I dreaded going to soccer practice. I was having so much fun developing my game. I just fell in love with it.

== High school ==
Vandersloot became a basketball star at Kentwood High School in her hometown. Her coach, Keith Hennig, a former player at Central Washington University who is 6 inches taller than Vandersloot, regularly played one-on-one against her either before or after the team's practice. He would later say, "I did not take it easy on her at all. I was more physical than anything she's ever been used to. At times, I wasn't too nice. I would ride her and foul her. I'd put my hand in her face and she would whine and complain about fouls. I'd say, 'There's no fouls out here.' " She eventually reached the point where she regularly beat her coach off the dribble.

A pivotal moment in her life came during the summer before her sophomore year, when she went with a friend to the Gonzaga University girls' basketball camp. She would say about the trip in 2011, "I just fell in love with this place. I felt so comfortable here." The Gonzaga women's basketball staff was equally enthusiastic about her, except for head coach Kelly Graves, who had little opportunity to see her during the camp. Graves would finally get to see Vandersloot at length in her junior year, on the day before the 2006 Washington Class 4A state tournament. He offered her a scholarship after seeing her practice, even though he did not stay for the tournament.

That season, she had averaged more than 18 points and 7 assists as she led Kentwood to its first state tournament appearance; they would lose in the second round of the tournament to Spokane's University High, led by future Tennessee star Angie Bjorklund. After that season, Vandersloot was asked by many people if she would consider Washington or another Pac-10 school, but decided against it after a Pac-10 assistant told Hennig she was too small. She would eventually sign with Gonzaga in November 2006, during her senior year at Kentwood; she noted in 2011, "I wasn't really being highly recruited and I just didn't want to go through the stressful recruiting process, so I committed early to Gonzaga."

Vandersloot took her game to another level as a senior, averaging 26 points, 7 assists, 5 rebounds, and 5 steals while leading Kentwood to a third-place finish in the state tournament; their only loss was in the state semifinals. She scored 113 points in the tournament, one shy of the state record for a girls' tournament, and was named MVP. Vandersloot was also consensus first-team all-state, and was named the state's player of the year by the Seattle Times. Vandersloot was rated as the No. 64 national prospect, and No. 35 among guards, by Scout.com.

== College career ==
By her own admission, Vandersloot came to Gonzaga as a shy freshman. During that first season, Graves suggested that she call the school's greatest point guard in history for advice—Hall of Famer John Stockton. Vandersloot would recall that it "took me a couple of weeks to build up" the nerve, and when she finally called Stockton for the first time, she hoped that she would reach his voice mail so she wouldn't have to talk. Vandersloot eventually worked with Stockton throughout her Gonzaga career.

As a freshman in 2007–08, she was the West Coast Conference newcomer of the year and named to the 10-member All-WCC first team after averaging 10.3 points, 5.7 assists, and 1.9 steals per game entering the WCC tournament, finishing in the top five in the WCC in the latter two categories while the Zags went 13–1 in conference play and earned the tournament's top seed. However, the Bulldogs lost in the WCC final to San Diego and ultimately missed out on the NCAA Tournament, playing instead in the WNIT. They defeated UC Davis in the first round before falling to Colorado in the second round.

In her 2008–09 sophomore season, she set a school record in assists with 239; at the end of the regular season, her average of 7.3 per game led the conference, and she was also third in the conference in scoring at 16.4 per game. Vandersloot won the first of what would be three WCC Player of the Year awards. The Bulldogs went on to win the WCC tournament, with Vandersloot named tournament MVP. In the NCAA tournament, the Zags defeated Xavier for the program's first NCAA Tournament win before narrowly losing in the second round to Pitt.

As a junior in 2009–10, Vandersloot led Division I in assists, averaging 9.4 per game, while leading the Zags to an unbeaten record in conference play. During that season, she broke her own school record for assists in a season with 321, and also broke the Gonzaga and WCC records for career assists. Vandersloot was again named both WCC Player of the Year and WCC Tournament MVP while leading the Bulldogs to a second consecutive WCC Tournament title. In the NCAA tournament, Vandersloot led the Zags one round farther than in 2009, upsetting No. 2 seed (and 2011 champion) Texas A&M before losing in the Sweet Sixteen to the Xavier team they had knocked out the year before.

Her senior year at Gonzaga, 2010–11, can be summed up as a season of milestones. She led the WCC in both scoring and assists on the way to a second straight unbeaten season in conference play. Vandersloot was named WCC Player of the Year for an unprecedented third time. The Zags again won the WCC Tournament, and Vandersloot was named tournament MVP for the third straight time, also becoming the first women's player in WCC history to win that honor three times.

In the NCAA tournament, the Bulldogs were a No. 11 seed, but had the advantage of playing their first-round and potential second-round games at their home court of McCarthey Athletic Center. They would take full advantage of their home court in the first two rounds. The Zags, seeded No. 11 in their region, opened the tournament with a 92–86 upset of Iowa, with Vandersloot scoring a career-high 34 points. In their second-round game against No. 3 seed UCLA, Vandersloot finished with 29 points and 17 assists, one assist shy of the record for a Division I tournament game, as the Zags took down the Bruins 89–75. During that game, she became the first player in Division I history to amass 2,000 career points and 1,000 career assists. The win advanced them to the Sweet Sixteen for the second straight year, and to a regional tournament that would be held less than two miles (3.2 km) from the Gonzaga campus at Spokane Arena.

During the Bulldogs' next game, a 76–69 win over Louisville, Vandersloot broke the Division I women's record for assists in a season previously held by Suzie McConnell. She finished with 29 points, 7 assists, and 7 steals as the Zags became the lowest-seeded team ever to reach a regional final in the women's tournament. Their tournament run, and Vandersloot's college career, would end one game later as Stanford would defeat the Zags 83–60. While she finished with 25 points, only four came in the second half. In addition to her other milestones during the season, she also broke the Gonzaga single-season scoring record.

Vandersloot became one of the most decorated players of the 2010–11 season. She won the women's Frances Pomeroy Naismith Award as the top Division I player no taller than 5 ft 8 in (1.73 m), and the Nancy Lieberman Award as the top point guard in Division I women's basketball. She was also named to multiple All-America teams. The AP named her a second-team All-America; she became the first women's player in WCC history to be named to that specific team. She also was named to the five-woman Wooden All-America Team, another honor never before achieved by a WCC player. Finally, she was named to the 10-player USBWA All-America team, becoming the first Gonzaga player so honored, and the 10-member State Farm Coaches All-America team, another first for a WCC player.

Her impact on the Gonzaga program can be measured by another statistic—home attendance. The year before she arrived in Spokane, the Bulldogs averaged 1,492 with a team that would make its first NCAA tournament appearance. By her junior year, attendance had risen to 2,935, and rose again to 3,824 in her senior season, with the Zags selling out the McCarthey Athletic Center twice before the NCAA tournament.

On February 11, 2023, Vandersloot had her number retired, becoming the first Gonzaga women's basketball player to receive the honor.

=== College awards and records ===
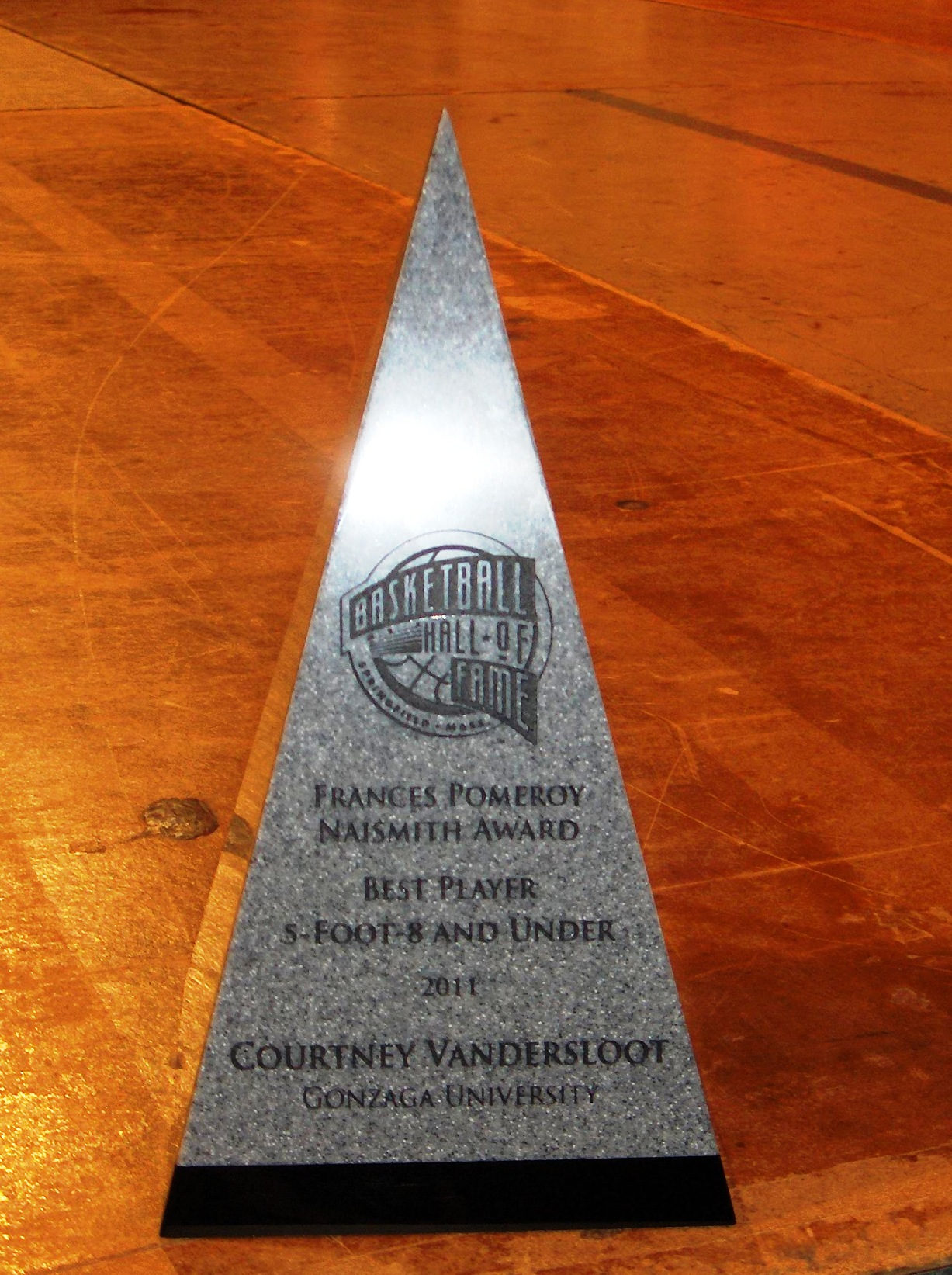
Frances Pomeroy Naismith Award

- Frances Pomeroy Naismith Award (2011)
- Nancy Lieberman Award (2011)
- 3× WCC Player of the Year (2009–2011)
- 3× WCC women's tournament MVP (2009–2011)
- 4× All-WCC (2008–2011)
- WCC Newcomer of the Year (2008)
- 2009 NCAA Women's Basketball All-Americans (honorable mention, AP)
- 2010 NCAA Women's Basketball All-Americans:
  - Honorable mention, AP
  - Honorable mention, State Farm Coaches'
- 2011 NCAA Women's Basketball All-Americans:
  - Wooden All-America
  - State Farm Coaches'
  - USBWA
  - Second team, AP
- No. 21 retired by Gonzaga Bulldogs

NCAA records:

- First NCAA Division I player of either gender with 2,000 points and 1,000 assists
- Most assists in a season, Division I (367)

== Professional career ==
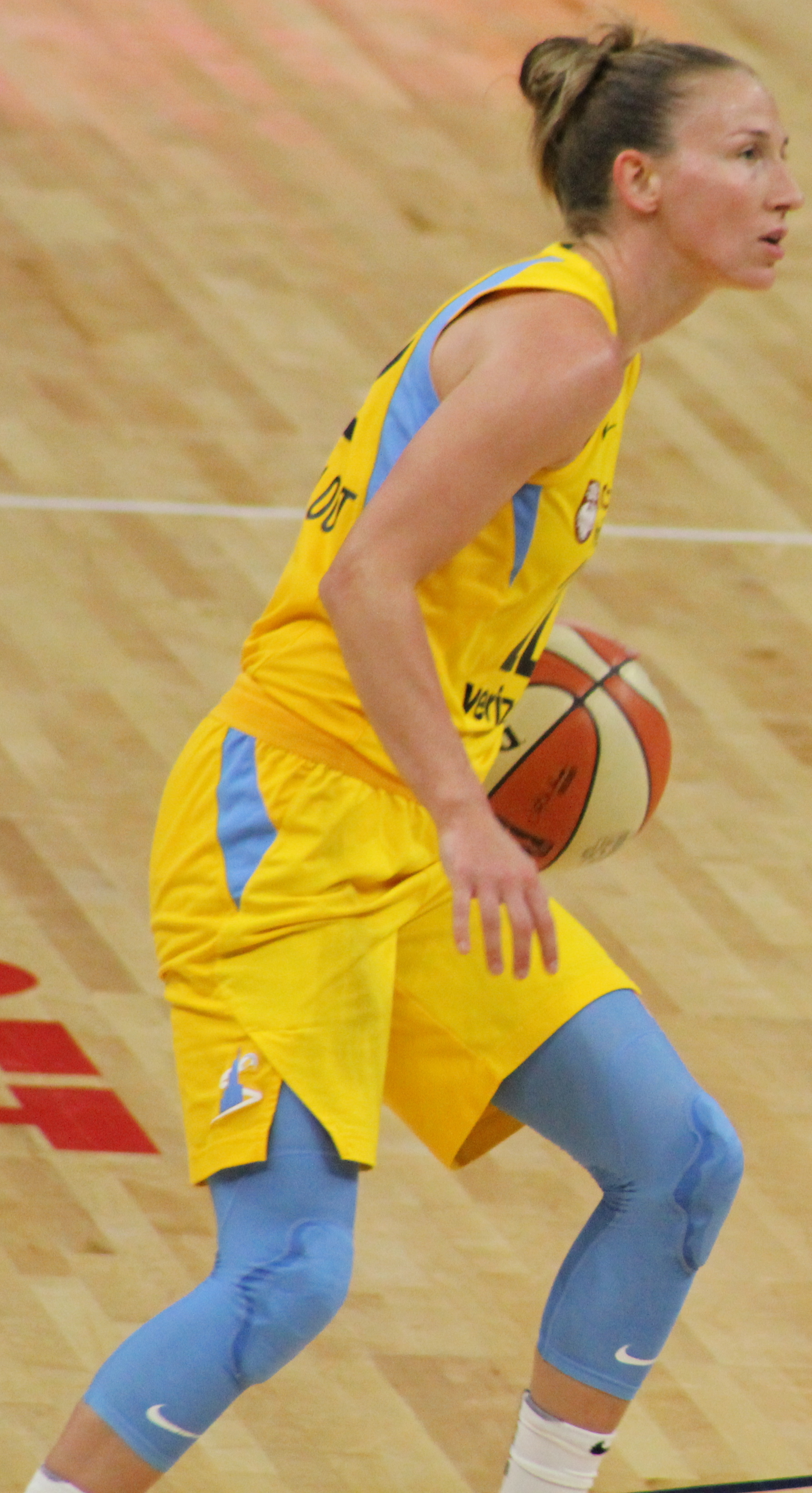
Vandersloot in 2018

=== WNBA ===
Vandersloot was widely considered to be one of the top prospects in the 2011 WNBA draft. Her relatively small size had been a subject of concern, as was her defense—despite averaging 4.5 steals per game in the 2011 NCAA tournament and ending her Gonzaga career with 366. However, she was seen as likely to be one of the top seven picks, and was ultimately picked third overall by the Chicago Sky. One indicator of her likely draft position was that Indiana Fever coach Lin Dunn, whose team needed depth at point guard going into the 2011 season, signed Shannon Bobbitt in February, convinced that Vandersloot would be picked before the Fever's turn at #9. John Stockton gave Vandersloot high praise, stating, "I don't want to dramatize it too much but she's like Gretzky in hockey. There is something that separates Courtney from others."

In her rookie season, she became the Sky's regular starter at the point, ultimately starting 26 of the team's 34 games. Her average of 3.7 assists per game (apg) was 11th in the league and second among rookies. She was also named as an Eastern Conference reserve for the 2011 WNBA All-Star Game, and was one of the five members of the 2011 All-Rookie Team, gaining 10 of a possible 11 votes from the league's head coaches.

She became a regular starter for the Sky in subsequent seasons, and helped lead the team to the 2014 WNBA Finals against the Phoenix Mercury in her fourth season, but the Sky were swept 3–0. The 2014 season also marked the first time Vandersloot led the league in assists per game (5.7). In the 2015 season, Vandersloot led the league in total assists (but came in second in assists-per-game to Candace Parker).

In the 2017 season, she led the league in assists for the second time in her career, setting the single-season league record for assists per game at 8.1 apg and the record for most assists over a 15-game stretch with 149. However, despite these efforts, the Sky finished 12–22, missing out on the playoffs for the first time in four years. In the 2018 season, Vandersloot broke the single-season record for assists and finished off the season with 258 assists and her own assists per game record with 8.6 apg. On July 20, 2018, Vandersloot became the seventh player in league history to post a triple-double, she scored 13 points along with 10 rebounds and a career-high 15 assists in a 114–99 victory over the Dallas Wings. She also averaged a career-high in scoring. Despite these performances, the Sky missed out on the playoffs yet again, they finished 13–21.

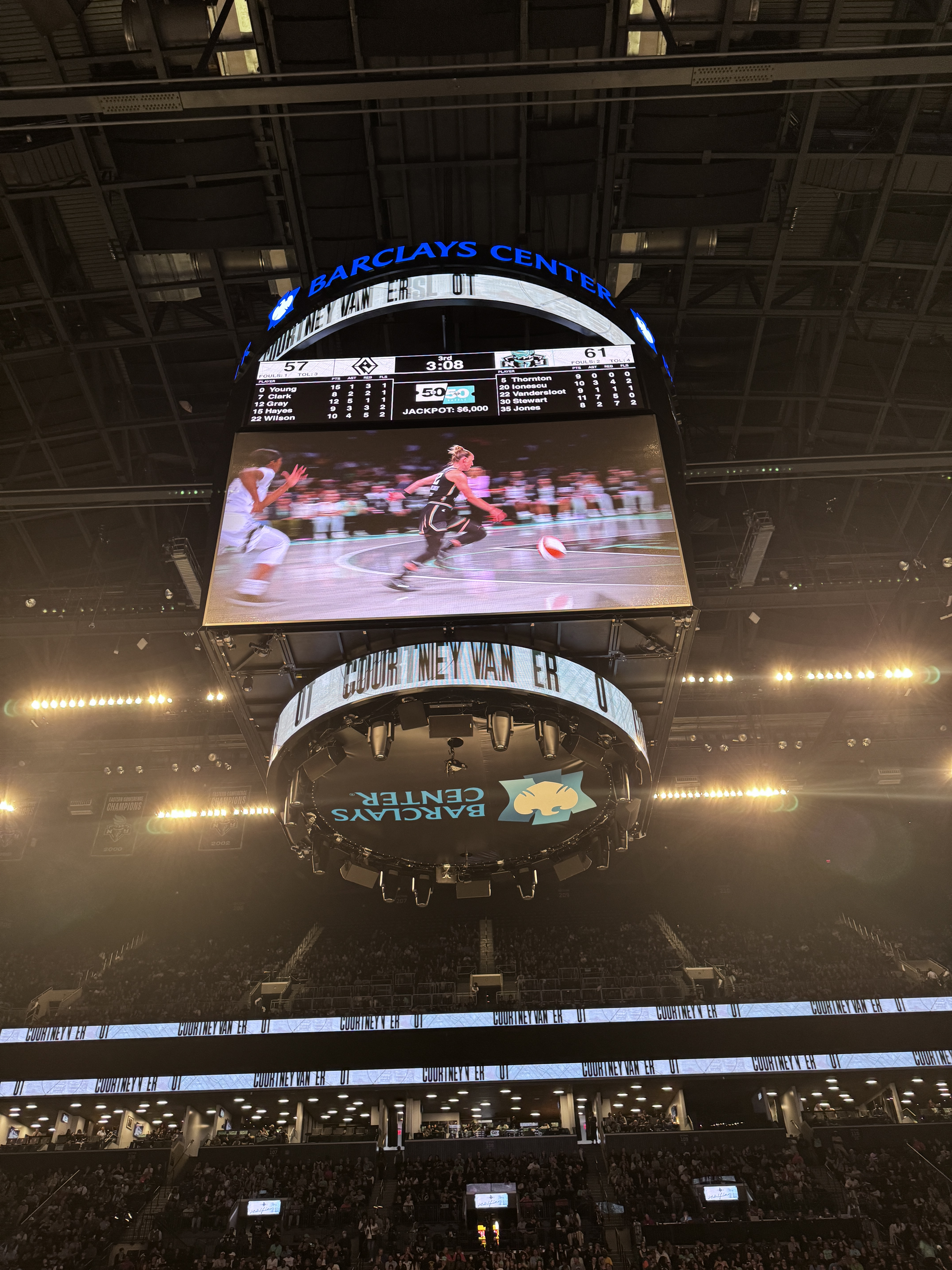
Courtney Vandersloot on the Jumbotron at Barclays center during the 2024 WNBA Playoffs

In the 2019 season, Vandersloot continued to exceed assists records. She broke her own league record with 9.1 assists per game. She was selected to the 2019 WNBA All-Star Game, making it her second All-Star appearance. Her season performance would help the Sky return to the playoffs with a 20–14 record, earning the number 5 seed. In the first-round elimination game, the Sky defeated the Phoenix Mercury 105–76 to advance. In the second-round elimination game, the Sky were defeated by the Las Vegas Aces 93–92 after a late game desperation half-court shot by Dearica Hamby.

In the 2020 season, the season was shortened to 22 games in a bubble at IMG Academy due to the COVID-19 pandemic. Vandersloot would average a career-high in scoring and once again set a new record for assists per game with 10, while playing and starting all 22 games. The Sky finished as the number 6 seed with a 12–10 record, but were eliminated by the Connecticut Sun in the first round elimination game.

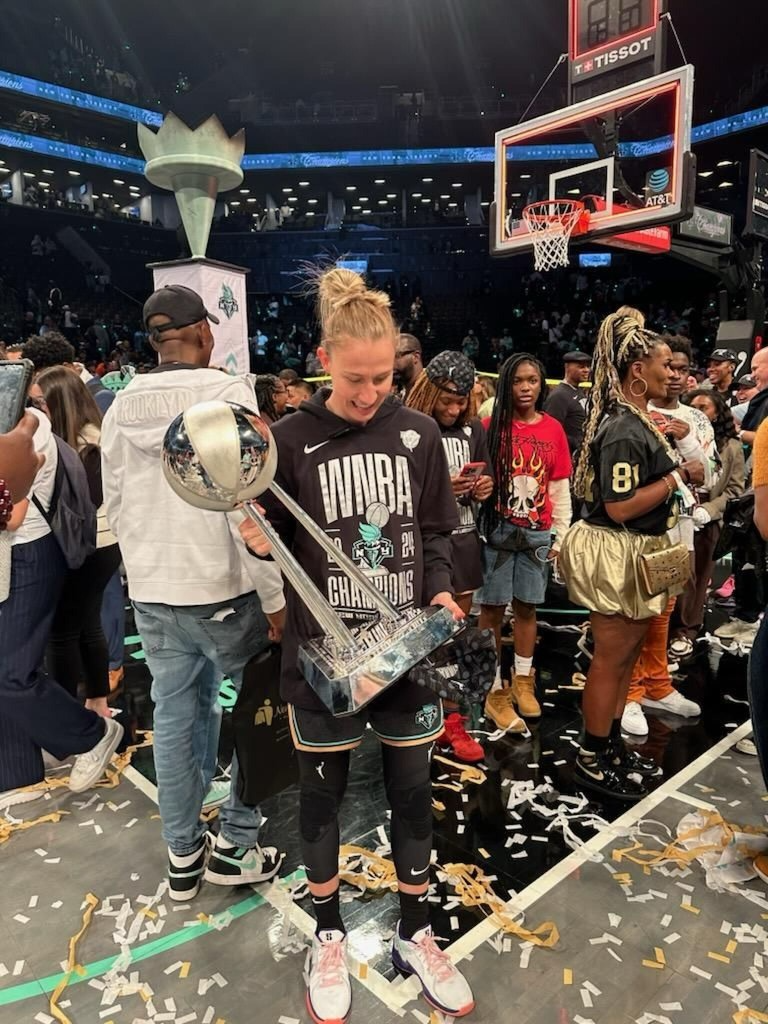
Courtney Vandersloot holds the New York Liberty's 2024 WNBA Championship Trophy during a at a post-win celebration at the Barclay's Center.

In the 2021 season, Vandersloot started all 32 games for the Sky and once again led the league with 8.6 assists per game. The Sky finished the season as the sixth seed with a 16–16 record, but went on to a successful run in the playoffs, winning two single-elimination games and a semifinals series against the first-seeded Connecticut Sun to reach the Finals for the first time since 2014. In the 2021 WNBA Finals, Vandersloot recorded 12.5 assists and 11.5 points per game, as the Sky defeated the Phoenix Mercury in four games to win their first championship. Across the 10 games in the 2021 postseason, she recorded 10.2 assists and 13 points per game.

After the 2022 season, Vandersloot became a free agent and signed with the New York Liberty in February 2023.

The New York Liberty placed second in the WNBA to the Las Vegas Aces in 2023. In 2024, the Liberty won the WNBA Championship over the Minnesota Lynx. Courtney dedicated the season to her mother, Jan Vandersloot, who died in mid-summer 2024.

In 2025, Vandersloot returned to the Sky. On June 8, 2025, it was announced that Vandersloot had sustained a right anterior cruciate ligament (ACL) tear during the June 7 game against the Indiana Fever, would undergo surgery, and would miss the rest of the 2025 season.

=== European leagues ===
In 2011, she signed with the Turkish club Beşiktaş. Because the WNBA season is held in the northern hemisphere summer, the traditional offseason for basketball throughout the world, many of the league's players participate in overseas leagues during the traditional season and return to their WNBA teams in the summer.

In February 2022, after the 2022 Russian invasion of Ukraine, she left UMMC Ekaterinburg in the Russian Women's Basketball Premier League. In April 2022, she joined Hungarian club Sopron Basket for the 2022–23 European season.

In January 2023, she signed with Fenerbahçe and left at end of the season.

=== Unrivaled ===
On September 16, 2024, it was announced that Vandersloot would appear and play in the inaugural season of Unrivaled, a new women's 3-on-3 basketball league founded by Napheesa Collier and Breanna Stewart.

== National team career ==
Vandersloot played internationally for the Hungary women's national basketball team as a naturalized citizen. She first appeared for Hungary in the 2016 EuroBasket Women qualifiers and later in the EuroBasket Women 2017 tournament. Vandersloot averaged 9.3 points and 3.8 assists per game in EuroBasket 2017, where Hungary lost to Italy in the qualification round before the quarterfinals.

== Personal life ==
On December 27, 2018, Vandersloot married Chicago Sky teammate, Allie Quigley, in Seattle, near Vandersloot's hometown of Kent, Washington. In May 2025, the couple announced the birth of their first child.

== Career statistics ==
Legend
GP	Games played	GS	Games started	MPG	Minutes per game	FG%	Field goal percentage
3P%	3-point field goal percentage	FT%	Free throw percentage	RPG	Rebounds per game	APG	Assists per game
SPG	Steals per game	BPG	Blocks per game	TO	Turnovers per game	PPG	Points per game
**Bold**	Career high	*	Led Division I	°	Led the league	‡	WNBA record

=== WNBA ===
†	Denotes seasons in which Vandersloot won a WNBA championship

==== Regular season ====
Stats current through end of 2026 season

WNBA regular season statistics
Year	Team	GP	GS	MPG	FG%	3P%	FT%	RPG	APG	SPG	BPG	TO	PPG
2011	Chicago	34	26	22.9	.391	.271	.766	2.0	3.7	0.7	0.3	2.7	6.5
2012	Chicago	34	27	26.7	.405	.333	.649	2.1	4.6	1.2	0.2	3.2	8.9
2013	Chicago	33	33	29.8	.396	.304	.833	3.2	5.6	1.3	**0.8**	2.4	8.8
2014	Chicago	18	16	25.1	.402	.375	.833	2.2	5.7°	1.1	0.5	2.6	6.8
2015	Chicago	34	34	29.8	.463	.356	.901	3.4	5.8	1.3	0.5	2.0	11.4
2016	Chicago	30	21	24.3	.419	.351	**.904**	2.7	4.7	1.3	0.1	**1.6**	9.5
2017	Chicago	27	22	30.3	**.516**	.382	.861	3.7	8.1°	1.2	0.2	2.9	11.5
2018	Chicago	30	30	**31.8**	.489	.398	.826	3.7	8.6°	1.3	0.5	3.4	12.5
2019	Chicago	33	33	30.0	.452	.290	.850	**4.3**	9.1°	1.4	0.5	2.9	11.2
2020	Chicago	22	22	31.5	.491	.395	.889	3.5	**10.0**‡	1.2	0.4	2.5	**13.6**
2021^{†}	Chicago	32	32	30.5	.433	.346	.857	3.4	8.6°	**1.7**	0.4	3.0	10.5
2022	Chicago	32	32	26.5	.481	.367	.765	3.9	6.5	1.2	0.5	2.7	11.8
2023	New York	**39**	**39**	30.4	.442	.294	.761	3.5	8.1°	1.3	0.6	2.7	10.5
2024^{†}	New York	31	31	22.3	.445	.269	.548	2.6	4.8	0.8	0.5	1.8	6.4
2025	Chicago	7	7	27.3	.439	.217	.846	3.1	5.3	1.6	0.3	2.4	10.6
2026	Chicago	27	24	22.4	.455	**.409**	.785	2.9	5.4	1.1	0.3	2.1	9.6
**Career**	16 years, 2 teams	463	429	27.7	.447	.339	.811	3.2	6.6	1.2	0.4	2.6	10.0
**Career**	All-Star	5	1	15.6	.550	.333	–	2.6	5.2	1.0	0.0	1.4	5.0

==== Playoffs ====
WNBA playoffs statistics
Year	Team	GP	GS	MPG	FG%	3P%	FT%	RPG	APG	SPG	BPG	TO	PPG
2013	Chicago	2	2	29.4	.300	.000	**1.000**	2.0	4.5	1.0	0.5	3.0	7.0
2014	Chicago	9	9	29.8	.383	.133	.850	2.3	6.4	1.3	0.2	2.1	7.3
2015	Chicago	3	3	31.8	.500	**.500**	**1.000**	4.7	8.3	0.3	**1.0**	2.6	**13.7**
2016	Chicago	5	5	29.7	.431	.333	**1.000**	2.4	6.4	**2.0**	0.2	2.6	13.2
2019	Chicago	2	2	30.7	.368	.333	—	3.0	**11.5**°	1.0	**1.0**	3.0	8.0
2020	Chicago	1	1	**36.0**	.500	**.500**	—	4.0	6.0	**2.0**	0.0	2.0	12.0
2021^{†}	Chicago	10	**10**	34.4	**.510**	.333	.842	**5.4**	10.2	1.5	0.8	3.5	13.0
2022	Chicago	8	8	28.3	.481	.261	.800	3.9	5.6	1.1	0.5	2.1	11.5
2023	New York	10	**10**	32.6	.420	.378	.800	3.9	6.3	1.3	0.7	2.8	10.6
2024^{†}	New York	**11**	0	14.3	.435	.385	.929	2.4	2.5	0.5	0.5	**1.0**	5.3
**Career**	10 years, 2 teams	61	50	28.2	.446	.324	.885	3.5	6.4‡	1.2	0.5	2.4	9.8

=== College ===
NCAA statistics
Year	Team	GP	GS	MPG	FG%	3P%	FT%	RPG	APG	SPG	BPG	TO	PPG
2007–08	Gonzaga	34	27	28.3	.412	.330	.654	3.9	5.6	1.8	0.2	3.0	10.6
2008–09	Gonzaga	32	31	32.8	.468	.376	.787	4.1	7.5	2.2	0.3	3.8	16.4
2009–10	Gonzaga	34	34	32.6	.472	.346	.746	3.8	9.4*	3.6	0.6	4.3	14.1
2010–11	Gonzaga	36	36	32.9	.486	.378	.831	3.7	10.2*	3.2	0.3	3.3	19.8
**Career**		136	128	32.9	.463	.358	.769	3.8	8.2	2.7	0.3	3.3	11.8

== See also ==
- List of WNBA career assists leaders
