= Jana Veselá =

Czech basketball player (born 1983)

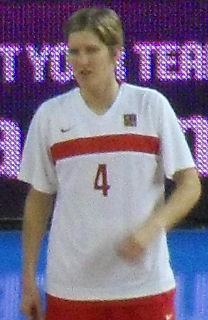

Personal information
- Born: 31 December 1983 (age 42) Prague, Czechoslovakia
- Listed height: 6 ft 4 in (1.93 m)

Career information
- Playing career: 2010–present
- Position: Forward

Career history
- 2000–2001: Sparta Prague
- 2001–2003: ZVVZ USK Prague
- 2003–2008: Gambrinus Brno
- 2008–2012: Ros Casares
- 2010: Seattle Storm
- 2012–2014: Antakya Belediyespor
- 2014–2015: USK Prague

Career highlights
- WNBA champion (2010)
- Stats at WNBA.com
- Stats at Basketball Reference
Medals
Representing Czech Republic
Women's basketball
World Championships
Silver medal – second place	2010 Czech Republic	Team
European Championships
Gold medal – first place	2005 Turkey	Team
Silver medal – second place	2003 Greece	Team

Jana Veselá (Czech pronunciation: [ˈjana ˈvɛsɛlaː]; born on 31 December 1983) is a Czech former professional basketball player, who played for several teams of the Czech Women's Basketball League and the Seattle Storm of the WNBA. She also played for Ros Casares and Antakya Belediyespor. She is 1.94 meters tall and played as a forward.

She played the Summer Olympics, the World Championship and the Eurobasket with the Czech Republic women's national basketball team, and she won the Euroleague Women three times with Gambrinus Brno, Ros Casares Valencia and USK Praha.

She also won the 2010 WNBA with Seattle Storm.

== Career statistics ==
Legend
GP	Games played	GS	Games started	MPG	Minutes per game	RPG	Rebounds per game
APG	Assists per game	SPG	Steals per game	BPG	Blocks per game	PPG	Points per game
TO	Turnovers per game	FG%	Field-goal percentage	3P%	3-point field-goal percentage	FT%	Free-throw percentage
**Bold**	Career best	°	League leader

†	Denotes seasons in which Bird won a WNBA championship

=== WNBA ===
==== Regular season ====
WNBA regular season statistics
Year	Team	GP	GS	MPG	FG%	3P%	FT%	RPG	APG	SPG	BPG	TO	PPG
2010^{†}	Seattle	29	0	11.4	.547	.400	.800	2.0	.6	.6	.2	.9	3.2

==== Playoffs ====
Year	Team	GP	GS	MPG	FG%	3P%	FT%	RPG	APG	SPG	BPG	TO	PPG
2010^{†}	Seattle	6	0	10.0	.692	.714	–	.8	.3	.3	.3	.7	3.8
