= Svetlana Abrosimova =

Russian basketball player (born 1980)

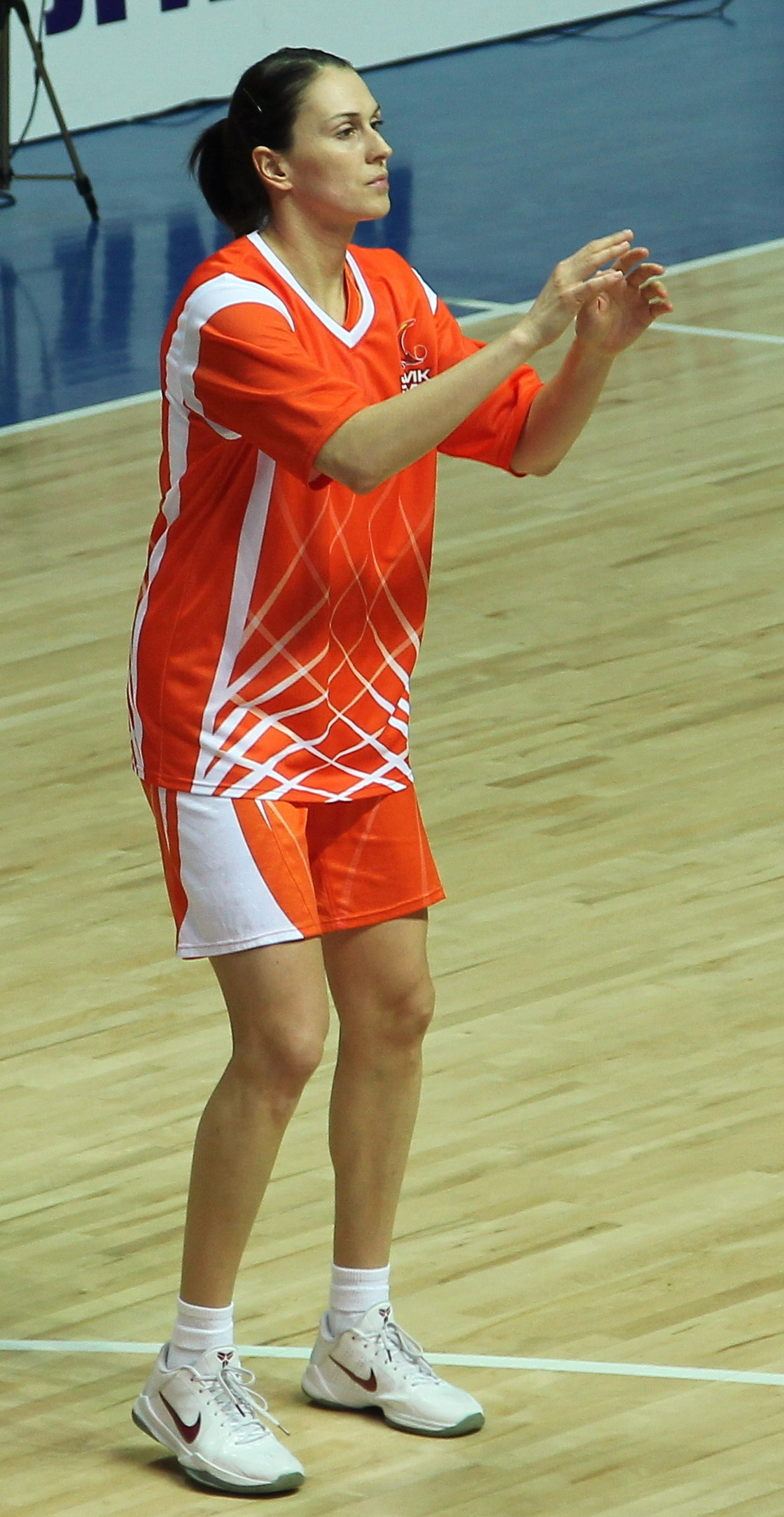
- Abrosimova in 2012

Personal information
- Born: 9 July 1980 (age 46) Leningrad, Russian SFSR, Soviet Union
- Listed height: 6 ft 2 in (1.88 m)
- Listed weight: 169 lb (77 kg)

Career information
- College: UConn (1997–2001)
- WNBA draft: 2001: 1st round, 7th overall pick
- Drafted by: Minnesota Lynx
- Position: Small forward

Career history
- 2001–2007: Minnesota Lynx
- 2008: Connecticut Sun
- 2010, 2012: Seattle Storm

Career highlights
- WNBA champion (2010); Russian Player of the Year (2009); NCAA champion (2000); First-team All-American – AP (2000); 2× Second-team All-American – AP (1999, 2001); 3× Kodak All-American (1999–2001); 3× All-American – USBWA (1999–2001); Big East Player of the Year (1999); 3× First-team All-Big East (1999–2001); Big East All-Freshman Team (1998)
- Stats at WNBA.com
- Stats at Basketball Reference
Medals
Representing Russia
Women's basketball
Olympic Games
| Bronze medal – third place | 2008 Beijing | Team competition |
World Championships
| Silver medal – second place | 1998 Germany | Team |
| Silver medal – second place | 2006 Brazil | Team |
European Championships
| Bronze medal – third place | 1999 Poland | Team |
| Silver medal – second place | 2005 Turkey | Team |
| Gold medal – first place | 2007 Italy | Team |
| Silver medal – second place | 2009 Latvia | Team |
| Gold medal – first place | 2011 Poland | Team |

Svetlana Olegovna Abrosimova (Russian: Светлана Олеговна Абросимова, born 9 July 1980) is a Russian basketball player who has played in college, the Olympics, and in professional leagues. She most recently played for the Seattle Storm in the Women's National Basketball Association (WNBA). She is usually called by her nickname, "Svet" or "Sveta".

Abrosimova was born in Leningrad, Russian SFSR, Soviet Union (today St. Petersburg, Russia), to Oleg and Ludmilla Abrosimov. Her father Oleg works as a welder in a shipyard and her older sister, Tatiana, was a professional ballroom dancer. While attending school she was trained for the then Soviet Olympic team. She was named the MVP of the 1996 European Basketball Championship (also known as Eurobasket), averaging 18 points, six rebounds and three assists per game. She was also a member of all-star teams that won the 1995 and 1996 European Championship.

Abrosimova was a member of the Russian national basketball team that placed sixth at the 2000 Summer Olympics and won a silver medal in the 1998 Basketball World Championship.

== College ==
In her freshman season (1997–1998) at the University of Connecticut, Abrosimova's team went 28–2 in the regular season, losing only to Tennessee and Rutgers. The team went on to win the Big East tournament, avenging the loss to Rutgers by beating Rutgers in the tournament championship. The team won their first three NCAA games, but Abrosimova was injured in the regional final against NC State, and the team lost, ending their season.

After a standout collegiate career, which included an NCAA national collegiate title in 2000, Abrosimova was selected in the first round (seventh overall pick) by the Minnesota Lynx during the 2001 WNBA draft despite a foot injury. She was a 3-time Kodak first team All-American while at UConn. Svetlana was a member of the inaugural class (2006) of inductees to the University of Connecticut women's basketball "Huskies of Honor" recognition program. She was unable to attend the ceremony in 2006 to honor her. However, UConn inducted the 2001–02 team into the Huskies of Honor on 29 December 2011. Abrosimova was a graduate assistant on that team so was invited to the ceremonies. She flew in from Russia to be part of the ceremony, and the school reprised her 2006 induction, covering up the plaque with her player number (25), then unveiling it as she was introduced.

== International ==
While still a junior in college, Abrosimova played for her native Russian Olympic team at the 2000 Summer Olympics, where her team finished sixth. She won a bronze medal at the 2008 Olympics.

== Professional ==
Like many other WNBA players, Abrosimova has played in various professional teams and leagues during the offseason. Following the Olympics, she was signed by the WNBA's Connecticut Sun for the remainder of the 2008 season.

She played for Ekaterinburg in her native Russia during the 2008–09 WNBA off-season.

Abrosimova helped the Seattle Storm win their second championship in 2010.

== WNBA career statistics ==
Legend
| GP | Games played | GS | Games started | MPG | Minutes per game | RPG | Rebounds per game |
| APG | Assists per game | SPG | Steals per game | BPG | Blocks per game | PPG | Points per game |
| TO | Turnovers per game | FG% | Field-goal percentage | 3P% | 3-point field-goal percentage | FT% | Free-throw percentage |
| **Bold** | Career best | ° | League leader |

| † | Denotes seasons in which Abrosimova won a WNBA championship |

=== Regular season ===
| Year | Team | GP | GS | MPG | FG% | 3P% | FT% | RPG | APG | SPG | BPG | TO | PPG |
|---|---|---|---|---|---|---|---|---|---|---|---|---|---|
| 2001 | Minnesota | 26 | 23 | **32.5** | .391 | .260 | .727 | **6.7** | 2.0 | 1.6 | 0.3 | 3.3 | **13.3** |
| 2002 | Minnesota | 27 | 27 | 29.8 | .377 | .333 | .483 | 5.4 | 2.2 | **1.6** | **0.4** | 3.4 | 11.6 |
| 2003 | Minnesota | 30 | 25 | 26.4 | .393 | .305 | .704 | 4.7 | **2.7** | 1.5 | **0.4** | 3.0 | 10.6 |
| 2004 | Minnesota | 22 | 11 | 21.0 | .353 | .377 | .609 | 3.4 | 2.0 | 1.4 | 0.1 | 2.0 | 6.6 |
| 2005 | Minnesota | 31 | **31** | 25.1 | .395 | .402 | .726 | 3.5 | 1.9 | 1.5 | 0.2 | 2.6 | 9.8 |
| 2006 | Minnesota | **34** | 2 | 21.2 | .411 | .369 | .661 | 3.1 | 1.6 | 1.0 | 0.0 | 1.8 | 7.7 |
| 2007 | Minnesota | **34** | 29 | 24.8 | **.443** | **.446** | **.837** | 4.4 | 2.5 | 1.3 | 0.1 | 2.0 | 10.1 |
| 2008 | Connecticut | 6 | 0 | 17.8 | .306 | .167 | .833 | 3.3 | 2.0 | 1.3 | 0.0 | 1.8 | 5.7 |
| 2010^{†} | Seattle | **34** | 1 | 20.2 | .415 | .376 | .568 | 3.1 | 2.0 | 1.2 | 0.1 | 1.8 | 7.6 |
| 2012 | Seattle | 19 | 4 | 17.3 | .347 | .222 | .458 | 2.9 | 1.6 | 1.1 | 0.2 | 2.1 | 4.6 |
| Career | 10 years, 3 teams | 263 | 153 | 24.2 | .396 | .351 | .654 | 4.1 | 2.1 | 1.3 | 0.2 | 2.4 | 9.2 |

=== Playoffs ===
| Year | Team | GP | GS | MPG | FG% | 3P% | FT% | RPG | APG | SPG | BPG | TO | PPG |
|---|---|---|---|---|---|---|---|---|---|---|---|---|---|
| 2003 | Minnesota | 3 | **3** | 23.0 | .273 | **.429** | **1.000** | 1.7 | 1.3 | **1.3** | 0.3 | 2.7 | 7.7 |
| 2004 | Minnesota | 2 | 2 | **33.5** | .348 | .250 | .500 | **4.5** | **1.5** | 0.5 | **1.0** | 1.5 | **10.0** |
| 2008 | Connecticut | 3 | 2 | 21.0 | .458 | .000 | .500 | 3.7 | 1.3 | **1.3** | 0.0 | 1.0 | 8.0 |
| 2010^{†} | Seattle | **7** | 0 | 15.1 | .387 | .375 | .556 | 1.7 | 0.9 | 0.3 | 0.1 | 1.9 | 5.0 |
| 2012 | Seattle | 2 | 0 | 3.5 | **.500** | .000 | .000 | 1.5 | 0.0 | 0.0 | 0.0 | 0.0 | 1.0 |
| Career | 5 years, 3 teams | 17 | 7 | 18.4 | .373 | .306 | .680 | 2.4 | 1.0 | 0.6 | 0.2 | 1.6 | 6.1 |

== UConn statistics ==
Svetlana Abrosimova Statistics at University of Connecticut
| Year | G | FG | FGA | PCT | 3FG | 3FGA | PCT | FT | FTA | PCT | REB | AVG | A | TO | B | S | MIN | PTS | AVG |
| 1997–98 | 37 | 191 | 372 | 0.513 | 34 | 80 | 0.425 | 122 | 184 | 0.663 | 235 | 5.4 | 114 | 158 | 7 | 90 | 972 | 538 | 14.5 |
| 1998–99 | 34 | 204 | 425 | 0.480 | 38 | 101 | 0.376 | 118 | 186 | 0.634 | 226 | 6.6 | 127 | 132 | 6 | 91 | 888 | 564 | 16.6 |
| 1999-00 | 37 | 181 | 369 | 0.491 | 43 | 108 | 0.398 | 91 | 122 | 0.746 | 229 | 6.2 | 154 | 105 | 8 | 64 | 1051 | 496 | 13.4 |
| 2000–01 | 19 | 100 | 186 | 0.538 | 26 | 58 | 0.448 | 41 | 58 | 0.707 | 124 | 6.5 | 78 | 33 | 0 | 54 | 466 | 267 | 14.1 |
| Totals | 127 | 676 | 1352 | 0.5 | 141 | 347 | 0.406 | 372 | 550 | 0.676 | 814 | 6.4 | 473 | 428 | 21 | 299 | 3377 | 1865 | 14.7 |

== Personal life ==
In 2017, Svetlana gave birth to twin girls, Maria Vladimirovna and Margarita Vladimirovna, fathered by Russian journalist and propagandist Vladimir Solovyov.

== See also ==
- Connecticut Huskies women's basketball
- List of Connecticut women's basketball players with 1000 points
