= Armelie Lumanu =

Congolese basketball player

No. 1 – Southern Lady Generals
- Position: Guard / forward
- League: WUBA

Personal information
- Born: March 30, 1988 (age 38) Matonge, Democratic Republic of the Congo
- Listed height: 5 ft 10 in (1.78 m)

Career information
- College: Southeastern Illinois (2006–2008); Mississippi State (2008–2010)
- WNBA draft: 2010: 2nd round, 23rd overall pick
- Drafted by: Indiana Fever

Career history
- 2011–present: Southern Lady Generals
- Stats at Basketball Reference

Armelie Kalonda Lumanu (born March 30, 1988) is a Congolese basketball player. She was drafted in the 2010 WNBA draft by the Indiana Fever

== FIBA competitions ==
Lumanu played in the following events:

- 2007 FIBA Africa Championship for Women
- 2005 FIBA Africa Championship for Women
- 2005 FIBA Women's U19 World Championship
- 2004 U18 African Championship for Women

== Personal life ==
Lumanu majored in physical education at Mississippi State University. She has a brother and a sister.
