= Tyra Grant =

American basketball player

Personal information
- Born: August 27, 1988 (age 38) Youngstown, Ohio, U.S.
- Listed height: 5 ft 11 in (1.80 m)

Career information
- High school: Ursuline (Youngstown, Ohio)
- College: Penn State (2006–2010)
- WNBA draft: 2010: 2nd round, 24th overall pick
- Drafted by: Phoenix Mercury
- Position: Guard

Career history
- 2010–2012: Kotka Peli-Karhut

Career highlights
- 2× First-team All-Big Ten (2009, 2010); Big Ten All-Freshman Team (2007)
- Stats at Basketball Reference

Tyra Grant (born August 27, 1988) is an American former professional basketball player. She was drafted by the Phoenix Mercury in the 2010 WNBA draft.

== College career ==
Grant earned AP Honorable Mention All-American honors in 2010, her senior year at Penn State.

== College statistics ==
Legend
GP	Games played	GS	Games started	MPG	Minutes per game
FG%	Field goal percentage	3P%	3-point field goal percentage	FT%	Free throw percentage
RPG	Rebounds per game	APG	Assists per game	SPG	Steals per game
BPG	Blocks per game	PPG	Points per game	**Bold**	Career high

Year	Team	GP	Points	FG%	3P%	FT%	RPG	APG	SPG	BPG	PPG
2006–07	Penn State	31	452	37.0	32.5	71.3	2.5	1.2	1.1	0.6	14.6
2007–08	Penn State	31	428	**42.1**	33.3	67.7	4.0	**2.1**	0.8	**0.7**	13.8
2008–09	Penn State	29	567	42.1	**36.7**	76.4	4.5	1.4	1.5	0.4	**19.6**
2009–10	Penn State	31	**597**	36.0	32.0	**78.9**	**4.8**	2.0	**1.8**	0.7	19.3
Career	Penn State	122	2044	39.1	33.7	74.3	3.9	1.7	1.3	0.6	16.8
