= Alison Lacey =

Australian-American basketball player and coach (born 1987)

Personal information
- Born: 26 December 1987 (age 38) Canberra, Australian Capital Territory
- Listed height: 6 ft 0 in (1.83 m)
- Listed weight: 159 lb (72 kg)

Career information
- High school: Ballard (Huxley, Iowa)
- College: Iowa State (2006–2010)
- WNBA draft: 2010: 1st round, 10th overall pick
- Drafted by: Seattle Storm
- Position: Guard
- Number: 40
- Coaching career: 2011–present

Career history

Playing
- 2010: Seattle Storm
- 2010: Canberra Capitals

Coaching
- 2012–2013: Marshalltown CC

Career highlights
- WNBA champion (2010)
- Stats at WNBA.com
- Stats at Basketball Reference

Alison Lacey Otzelberger (born Alison Mavis Lacey; 26 December 1987) is an Australian-American basketball coach and former player. She played in the WNBA and was subsequently a collegiate women's basketball coach in the US at Marshalltown Community College in Iowa.

== College career ==
From 20026 through 2010, Lacey played at Iowa State, then became the highest-drafted player in school history. She is the only player from ISU, and only the seventh in Big 12 history, to record 1,500 points, 500 rebounds and 500 assists. She became the second player in school history to record a triple-double. She also led the nation in assist-turnover ratio for most of the season, while finishing second at the end. She led Iowa State to four consecutive NCAA tournaments, which included an Elite 8 and a Sweet 16. She was on the All-Big 12 First Team, and was an All-American honorable mention.

== Professional career ==
Lacey watched the Seattle Storm win their second championship in 2010. She did not return to the WNBA for the 2011 season.

She also played for the Canberra Capitals in the WNBL.

== Coaching career ==
Lacey was hired as head coach of the Marshalltown Community College women's basketball team in February 2012 after former coach, Larry Roberts, was released from his coaching duties. The Tigers finished the year with an 11–17 record. Lacey led the team to an 11–20 record in 2012–13, her only full season as head coach. She resigned effective 1 July 2013, after her then-fiancé T. J. Otzelberger accepted a coaching position with the men's basketball program at the University of Washington.

== Career statistics ==
Legend
GP	Games played	GS	Games started	MPG	Minutes per game	RPG	Rebounds per game
APG	Assists per game	SPG	Steals per game	BPG	Blocks per game	PPG	Points per game
TO	Turnovers per game	FG%	Field-goal percentage	3P%	3-point field-goal percentage	FT%	Free-throw percentage
**Bold**	Career best	°	League leader

†	Denotes seasons in which Lacey won a WNBA championship

=== WNBA ===
==== Regular season ====
WNBA regular season statistics
Year	Team	GP	GS	MPG	FG%	3P%	FT%	RPG	APG	SPG	BPG	TO	PPG
2010^{†}	Seattle	21	0	6.9	.114	.111	1.000	0.8	0.5	0.3	0.0	0.4	0.8
**Career**	1 year, 1 team	21	0	6.9	.114	.111	1.000	0.8	0.5	0.3	0.0	0.4	0.8

==== Playoffs ====
WNBA playoff statistics
Year	Team	GP	GS	MPG	FG%	3P%	FT%	RPG	APG	SPG	BPG	TO	PPG
2010^{†}	Seattle	1	0	1.0	—	—	—	0.0	0.0	0.0	0.0	0.0	0.0
**Career**	1 years, 1 team	1	0	1.0	—	—	—	0.0	0.0	0.0	0.0	0.0	0.0

=== College ===
NCAA statistics
Year	Team	GP	GS	MPG	FG%	3P%	FT%	RPG	APG	SPG	BPG	TO	PPG
2006–07	Iowa State	**35**	—	26.4	**.444**	.405	.820	3.9	1.8	0.8	**0.3**	**1.0**	7.7
2007–08	Iowa State	34	—	**34.8**	.400	**.407**	.777	3.8	4.3	0.9	0.2	2.6	14.2
2008–09	Iowa State	**35**	—	30.9	.349	.324	.846	4.7	3.7	1.1	**0.3**	2.1	11.2
2009–10	Iowa State	30	30	12.3	.442	.373	**.879**	**4.9**	**6.2**	**1.3**	0.1	2.1	**15.8**
**Career**		134	—	31.3	.404	.377	.833	4.3	3.9	1.0	0.2	1.9	12.1

== Personal life ==
Lacey married T. J. Otzelberger in June 2013 in Milwaukee.

== See also ==
- List of Australian WNBA players
