= 2010 WNBA draft =

2010 meeting of WNBA teams to select players

General information
- Sport: Basketball
- Date: December 14, 2009 – April 8, 2010
- Location: Secaucus, New Jersey
- Networks: ESPN2, NBATV, ESPNU

Overview
- League: WNBA
- Merging teams: Sacramento Monarchs (folded in 2009)
- First selection: Tina Charles; Connecticut Sun

The 2010 WNBA draft is the league's annual process for determining which teams receive the rights to negotiate with players entering the league. The draft was held on April 8, 2010. The first round was shown on ESPN2 (HD), while the second and third rounds were shown on NBA TV and ESPNU.

A lottery was held on November 5, 2009. The Minnesota Lynx received the first overall selection of the draft. The Sacramento Monarchs received the number two selection. The Connecticut Sun came up with the third overall selection, followed by the Minnesota Lynx again at four, and the Chicago Sky at number five.

Additionally, on December 14, 2009, the WNBA held a dispersal draft to re-assign players from the Sacramento Monarchs who folded at the end of 2009 WNBA season. Since the Monarchs folded after the draft lottery took place, their pick was simply eliminated.

As of 2026, Alysha Clark is the only remaining active WNBA player from this draft.

== Draft lottery ==
The lottery selection to determine the order of the top five picks in the 2010 Draft occurred on November 5, 2009, the Minnesota Lynx won the first pick, while the Sacramento Monarchs and Connecticut Sun were awarded the second and third picks respectively. The remaining first-round picks and all the second- and third-round picks were assigned to teams in reverse order of their win–loss records in the previous season.

Below were the chances for each team to get specific picks in the 2010 draft lottery, rounded to three decimal places (Note: Notes: Team selected for the No. 1 pick noted in bold text; Shaded block denotes actual lottery result):

Team	2009 record	Lottery chances	Pick				
Team	2009 record	Lottery chances	1st	2nd	3rd	4th	5th
Sacramento Monarchs (Note: Sacramento Monarchs folded in December 2009, so their No. 2 pick was removed and the subsequent draft picks moved one place up.)	12–22	420	.420	.302	.181	.097	.000
**Minnesota Lynx** (from New York via Los Angeles) (Note: May 5, 2009: Three-team trade among Los Angeles, Minnesota, and New York: Los Angeles acquired Noelle Quinn (from Minnesota) and a 2010 first-round pick (from New York); New York acquired Sidney Spencer (from Los Angeles); Minnesota acquired exclusive negotiating rights for Raffaella Masciadri and New York's 2010 first-round pick (from Los Angeles))	13–21	261	.261	.284	.246	.200	.008
**Minnesota Lynx**	14–20	167	.167	.207	.263	.315	.048
Connecticut Sun	16–18	78	.076	.103	.155	.388	.278
Chicago Sky	16–18	78	.076	.103	.155	.000	.666

== Transactions ==
- January 30, 2009: The Washington Mystics receive the second-round pick from the Minnesota Lynx as part of the Lindsey Harding transaction.
- March 26, 2009: The Los Angeles Sparks receive the first-round pick from the Phoenix Mercury as part of the Temeka Johnson transaction.
- May 5, 2009: The Minnesota Lynx receive the first-round pick from the New York Liberty (via L.A.) as part of the Sidney Spencer/Noelle Quinn transaction.
- November 20, 2009: The league announces the folding of the Sacramento Monarchs. The Monarchs' picks in the draft were simply eliminated.
- January 12, 2010: The Connecticut Sun receive the first overall pick in exchange for the second overall pick from the Minnesota Lynx as part of the Lindsay Whalen/Renee Montgomery transaction.

== Key ==
!	Denotes player who has been inducted to the Naismith Basketball Hall of Fame
^	Denotes player who has been inducted to the Women's Basketball Hall of Fame
*	Denotes player who has been selected for at least one All-Star Game and All-WNBA Team
^{+}	Denotes player who has been selected for at least one All-Star Game
^{#}	Denotes player who never played in the WNBA regular season or playoffs
**Bold**	Denotes player who won Rookie of the Year

== Draft ==
=== Round 1 ===
Pick	Player	Nationality	Team	School / club team
1	**Tina Charles** *	United States	Connecticut Sun (from New York via Los Angeles and Minnesota)	Connecticut
2	Monica Wright	United States	Minnesota Lynx (from Connedcticut)	Virginia
3	Kelsey Griffin (traded to Connecticut)	United States	Minnesota Lynx	Nebraska
4	Epiphanny Prince *	United States	Chicago Sky	Rutgers/Turkey
5	Jayne Appel	United States	San Antonio Silver Stars	Stanford
6	Jacinta Monroe	United States	Washington Mystics	Florida State
7	Danielle McCray	United States	Connecticut Sun (from Tulsa)	Kansas
8	Andrea Riley	United States	Los Angeles Sparks	Oklahoma State
9	Chanel Mokango	DR Congo	Atlanta Dream	Mississippi State
10	Alison Lacey	Australia	Seattle Storm	Iowa State
11	Jené Morris	United States	Indiana Fever	San Diego State
12	Bianca Thomas ^{#}	United States	Los Angeles Sparks (from Phoenix)	Ole Miss

=== Round 2 ===
Pick	Player	Nationality	Team	School / club team
13	Kalana Greene	United States	New York Liberty	Connecticut
14	Jenna Smith ^{#}	United States	Washington Mystics (from Minnesota)	Illinois
15	Allison Hightower ^{+}	United States	Connecticut Sun	LSU
16	Ashley Houts	United States	New York Liberty (from Chicago)	Georgia
17	Alysha Clark	Israel / United States	San Antonio Silver Stars	Middle Tennessee
18	Shanavia Dowdell ^{#}	United States	Washington Mystics	Louisiana Tech
19	Amanda Thompson	United States	Tulsa Shock	Oklahoma
20	Angel Robinson	United States	Los Angeles Sparks	Georgia
21	Brigitte Ardossi ^{#}	Australia	Atlanta Dream	Georgia Tech
22	Tanisha Smith ^{#}	United States	Seattle Storm	Texas A&M
23	Armelie Lumanu ^{#}	DR Congo	Indiana Fever	Mississippi State
24	Tyra Grant ^{#}	United States	Phoenix Mercury	Penn State

=== Round 3 ===
Pick	Player	Nationality	Team	School / club team
25	Cory Montgomery ^{#}	United States	New York Liberty	Nebraska
26	Gabriela Marginean	Romania	Minnesota Lynx	Drexel
27	Johannah Leedham ^{#}	Great Britain	Connecticut Sun	Franklin Pierce
28	Abi Olajuwon	United States	Chicago Sky	Oklahoma
29	Alexis Rack ^{#}	United States	San Antonio Silver Stars	Mississippi State
30	Alexis Gray-Lawson	United States	Washington Mystics	California
31	Vivian Frieson ^{#}	United States	Tulsa Shock	Gonzaga
32	Rashidat Junaid ^{#}	United States	Los Angeles Sparks	Rutgers
33	Brittainey Raven	United States	Atlanta Dream	Texas
34	Tijana Krivačević ^{#}	Serbia / Hungary	Seattle Storm	MKB Euroleasing Sopron (Hungary)
35	Joy Cheek	United States	Indiana Fever	Duke
36	Nyeshia Stevenson ^{#}	United States	Phoenix Mercury	Oklahoma

== See also ==
- List of first overall WNBA draft picks
