= Tanisha Smith =

American basketball player

Personal information
- Born: May 11, 1988 (age 38) Kansas City, Missouri, U.S.
- Listed height: 6 ft 0 in (1.83 m)

Career information
- High school: Lincoln Prep (Kansas City, Missouri)
- College: Arkansas – Fort Smith (2006–2008); Texas A&M (2008–2010)
- WNBA draft: 2010: 2nd round, 22nd overall pick
- Drafted by: Seattle Storm
- Position: Guard / forward

Career highlights
- First-team All-Big 12 (2010)
- Stats at Basketball Reference

Tanisha Smith (born May 11, 1988) is an American former professional basketball player who was drafted by the Seattle Storm in the second round of the 2011 WNBA draft. She played college basketball for Texas A&M and University of Arkansas – Fort Smith.

== Texas A&M statistics ==
Legend
GP	Games played	GS	Games started	MPG	Minutes per game
FG%	Field goal percentage	3P%	3-point field goal percentage	FT%	Free throw percentage
RPG	Rebounds per game	APG	Assists per game	SPG	Steals per game
BPG	Blocks per game	PPG	Points per game	**Bold**	Career high

Year	Team	GP	Points	FG%	3P%	FT%	RPG	APG	SPG	BPG	PPG
2008–09	Texas A&M	34	362	**45.1%**	**44.6%**	**78.9%**	3.6	2.1	1.7	**0.7**	10.6
2009–10	Texas A&M	34	**514**	45.0%	35.8%	69.8%	**5.4**	**3.6**	**2.2**	0.6	**15.1**
Career		68	876	45.1%	11.1%	72.8%	23.6	2.9	2.0	0.7	12.9
